= List of awards and nominations received by Despina Vandi =

Despina Vandi awards and nominations
- Despina Vandi performing at World Music Awards(after party) in America!.
Award	Wins	Nominations
Arion Music Awards	8	10
Balkan Music Awards	1	3
Daf BAMA Music Awards	1	1
Hit FM Russia Awards	1	1
House Music Awards	1	1
International Dance Music Awards	1	1
MAD Music Awards Cyprus	0	4
MAD Video Music Awards	19	58
MTV Europe Music Awards	0	2
Must Magazine Style Awards	1	1
Oriflame Directors' Seminar Awards	1	1
Pop Corn Music Awards	7	14
Rádio Nova Era Awards	1	1
World Music Awards	1	1
Star Radio Awards	1	1
- Totals
Awards won	43
Nominations	80+
Honorary Awards	5

Despina Vandi is a Greek laïko singer who was born in Stuttgart–Tübingen, West Germany and later raised in Kavala, Greece. She has had three records certified gold and 11 certified at least once platinum by the International Federation of the Phonographic Industry of Greece. Since the beginning of her recording career in 1994, Vandi has released eight studio albums in Greece and Cyprus: Gela Mou (1994), Esena Perimeno (1996), Profities (1999), Gia (2001), Stin Avli Tou Paradeisou (2004), 10 Hronia Mazi (2007), and C'est La Vie (2010). She has also released one live album, titled Despina Vandi Live and two studio albums abroad: Gia (2003) and Come Along Now (2005). Vandi's releases have been issued on the record labels Minos EMI (1994–2000), Heaven Music (2001–09), and The Spicy Effect (2010–present).

Vandi has been awarded mostly in laïko and dance music categories. Since receiving her first nomination of her career in 1997, Vandi has won three Pop Corn Music Awards for Best Female Singer, Best Female Stage Performance, and Best Song, as well as three Arion Music Awards for Female Artist of the Year, Best-Selling Album of 2002 for Gia, and Live Album of the Year. Both of the aforementioned awards ceremonies have served as the national awards ceremonies until their respective cancellations. Vandi's first and most significant international award came in 2002 at the World Music Awards where she was awarded as being the Best-Selling Greek Artist of 2001; she was the first Greek artist actually recording in Greece to receive the award, and one of four overall. As Vandi began receiving international exposure while pursuing a career abroad during the period of 2003–05, her music and remixes of it earned awards and nominations at international dance music-oriented award ceremonies. She also received honours from dance-oriented radio stations in the United States, Portugal, and Russia. Since 2004, Vandi has received ten MAD Video Music Awards, including Female Artist of the Year and Artist of the Year, making her the second most honoured female artist and tied for third most honoured artist overall in the award's history as of 2010. In addition to these recognized awards, Vandi has also received an honorary award by Richard Branson of Virgin for her single "Ipofero", which was recognized as the best-selling single of all-time at the Greek Virgin Megastores, after surpassing sales of 100 thousand copies, while in March 2010 Alpha TV ranked her the top-certified Greek female artist of the phonographic era (since 1960), making her the youngest artist in both age and career longevity within the top ten. Overall, Vandi has received 57(8Honorary) recognized awards from 90+ nominations. She is also o coach at "The Voice of Greece"(2014–15)she is also the Winner Coach of the first season and she is second at this season.

== Arion Music Awards ==
The Arion Music Awards are the official Greek music industry awards by IFPI Greece since 2002, after the Pop Corn Music Awards, which were organized by the Greek magazine Pop Corn from 1992–2001, were discontinued. The Arions were broadcast by Mega Channel in their first five years before moving to ANT1 channel. The awards have not been held since 2007 for various reasons. Despina Vandi has won eight awards from ten nominations.

Year	Nominee / work	Award	Result
2003	Ante Gia	Female Singer of the Year	Won
2003	Gia	Best-Selling Album of the Year	Won
2004	Despina Vandi Live	Female Singer of the Year	Won
2004	Despina Vandi Live	Live Album of the Year	Won
2005	Despina Vandi	Laiko Female Singer	Nominated
2005	Despina Vandi	Pop Female Singer	Won
2005	Despina Vandi	Female Singer of the Year	Won
2005	Stin Avli Tou Paradisou	Pop Album	Won
2005	Stin Avli Tou Paradisou	Album of the Year	Nominated
2006	Special Edition	Female Singer of the Year	Won

== Balkan Music Awards ==
On December 7, 2009, Balkanika Music Television officially announced the start of the First Balkan Music Awards 2010.

Despina Vandi has two nominations for the Balkan Music Awards 2011 and one nomination for the Balkan Music Awards 2012.

Year	Nominee / work	Award	Result
2011	Kommati Ap' Tin Kardia Sou	Best Song in the Balkans from Republic of Greece for 2010	Nominated
2011	Despina Vandi	Best Female Artist in the Balkans for 2010	Won
2012	Erota Theli I Zoi (Remix), Despina Vandi feat. Ypohthonios	Best Song in the Balkans from Republic of Greece for 2011	Nominated

== Daf BAMA Music Awards ==
The Daf BAMA Music Awards is a tremendous effort to honor the artists who have spread their charms, breaking the boundary between the countries. The most talented artistic personas in music industry in the eastern European countries are awarded. Every culture has their own taste of music and songs, creating an amazingly rich multiplicity of people of these countries. From Gazal singers to Rap artists, singers from all genres are being presented gloriously in front of the world under one banner.

Year	Nominee / work	Award	Result
2016	Despina Vandi	Favorite Greek Artist	Won

== Hit FM Russia Awards ==
Despina Vandi has won one award from one nomination.

Year	Nominee / work	Award	Result
2004	Come Along Now	Honorary Award	Won

== House Music Awards ==
Vandi herself has been won once, while her work has been nominated three times, having one once.

Year	Nominee / work	Award	Result
2004	Gia, Ultra Records	Best Vocal	Won

== International Dance Music Awards ==
The Winter Music Conference was established in 1985. It is a part of the Winter Music Conference, a weeklong electronic music event held annually. Despina Vandi has been won as Best New Dance Artist Solo for the 20th Annual IDMA.

Year	Nominee / work	Award	Result
2005	Despina Vandi	Best New Dance Artist Solo	Won

== MAD Music Awards Cyprus ==
The MAD Music Awards Cyprus created by MAD TV Cyprus in 2015. They are similar to Greek MAD Video Music Awards.

Year	Nominee / work	Award	Result
2015	Despina Vandi	Best Female Artist	Nominated
2015	Kane Kati	Best Video Clip of the Year	Nominated
2016	Mia Anasa Maria Sou	Best Single of the Year	Nominated
2016	Despina Vandi	Best Live in Cyprus	Nominated

== MAD Video Music Awards ==
The MAD Video Music Awards are held annually in June by MAD TV since 2004. In its first two years, the awards were televised on ANT1 for non-satellite viewers, but have since moved to Alpha TV. Despina Vandi has received 19 awards from 58 nominations.

Year	Nominee / work	Award	Result
2004	Despina Vandi	Artist of the Year with the Most Played Video Clip	Nominated
2005	Happy End	Best Contemporary Laiko Video Clip	Won
2005	Come Along Now, Phoebus feat. Despina Vandi	Best Dance Video Clip	Nominated
2005	Come Along Now, Phoebus feat. Despina Vandi	Best Video Clip of a Woman Artist	Nominated
2005	Come Along Now, Phoebus feat. Despina Vandi	Best Video Clip of the Year	Nominated
2005	Come Along Now, Phoebus feat. Despina Vandi	Best-Dressed Artist in a Video Clip	Won
2005	Despina Vandi	Artist of the Year with the Most Played Video Clip	Won
2006	Stin Avli Tou Paradisou	Best Contemporary Laiko Video Clip	Won
2006	Stin Avli Tou Paradisou	Best Female Artist Video Clip	Nominated
2006	Stin Avli Tou Paradisou	Best Direction in a Video Clip (Kostas Kapetanidis)	Won
2006	Jambi, Despina Vandi - Phoebus	Best Dance Video Clip	Won
2006	Despina Vandi	Artist of the Year with the Most Played Video Clip	Nominated
2007	Kalanta	Best Dance Video Clip	Nominated
2007	Kalanta	Best Direction in a Video Clip (Kostas Kapetanidis)	Won
2007	Amane, Despina Vandi - Giorgos Mazonakis	Best Duet Video Clip	Won
2008	Thelo	Best Pop Video Clip	Nominated
2008	Despina Vandi	Female Artist of the Year	Won
2009	Despina Vandi	Female Artist of the Year	Nominated
2010	Despina Vandi	Female Artist of the Year	Won
2011	Koritsi Prama	Video Clip Pop	Nominated
2011	Erota Theli I Zoi Ke Ohi Polemo (Erota Theli I Zoi)	Lyric - Cue	Nominated
2011	Despina Vandi	Female Artist of the Year	Nominated
2012	Girismata	Video Clip MAD Greekz	Nominated
2012	Ehi O Keros Girismata (Girismata)	Lyric - Cue	Won
2012	Despina Vandi	Female Artist of the Year	Nominated
2013	Katalaveno	Fashion Icon in a Video Clip	Nominated
2013	Despina Vandi	Female Artist of the Year	Nominated
2013	Iparxi Zoi (2009)	Best Mad Act 10 Years	N/A
2013	To Nisi	Top50 Songs of the Year	Nominated
2013	To Asteri Mou	Top50 Songs of the Year	Nominated
2014	Hano Esena	Video Clip Pop	Nominated
2014	Despina Vandi	Female Artist of the Year	Won
2014	Despina Vandi	Artist of the Year	Won
2014	Hano Esena	Video Clip of the Year	Nominated
2015	Despina Vandi	Female Artist of the Year	Won
2015	Kane Kati	Best MAD Greekζ Video	Nominated
2015	Kane Kati	Best Video of the Year	Nominated
2015	Ola Allazoun	Best Pop Video	Nominated
2016	Despina Vandi	Best Female Adult	Won
2016	Mia Anasa Makria Sou	Best Video of the Year	Nominated
2016	Mia Anasa Makria Sou	Best Pop Video	Nominated
2017	Despina Vandi	Best Female Adult	Nominated
2017	Despina Vandi	Superfans Of The Year	Nominated
2021	Despina Vandi	Best Female Adult	Nominated
2021	Ena Tsiggaro Diadromi	Best Video Laiko	Nominated
2024	Ya Habibi, Despina Vandi - KINGS	Best Collaboration	Nominated
2024	Ya Habibi	Best Air play Song	Nominated
2024	Ya Habibi	Video Clip Of The Year	Nominated
2024	S'agapao Kai Den Pao Kala	Best Greek Dance Song	Nominated
2024	Despina Vandi	Pop-Laiko Artist	Won
2025	Panselinos, Despina Vandi - Mente Fuerte	Best Adult Pop Song	Nominated
2025	Panselinos, Despina Vandi - Mente Fuerte	Song of the Year/Airplay	Won
2025	Panselinos, Despina Vandi - Mente Fuerte	Viral Song	Nominated
2025	Panselinos, Despina Vandi - Mente Fuerte	Video of the Year	Nominated
2025	Panselinos, Despina Vandi - Mente Fuerte	Song of the Year/Digital	Nominated
2025	Panselinos, Despina Vandi - Mente Fuerte	Best Collaboration	Won
2025	Despina Vandi	Best Laiko Artist	Nominated
2025	Despina Vandi	Artist of the Year/Digital Sales	Nominated
2025	Despina Vandi	Artist of the Year/Viral	Nominated

== MTV Europe Music Awards ==
The MTV Europe Music Awards ("EMAs" or "EMA") are an event presented by MTV Networks Europe which awards prizes to musicians and performers. The first EMAs ceremony was held in 1994.[1] Originally conceived as an alternative to the MTV Video Music Awards and since 2011 other worldwide, regional nominations have been added. Despina Vandi has one nomination for the MTV Europe Music Awards 2014.

Year	Nominee / work	Award	Result
2014	Despina Vandi	Best Greek Act	Nominated
2015	Despina Vandi	Best Greek Act	Nominated

== Must Magazine Style Awards ==
Despina Vandi was nominated in the first "Must Magazine Style Awards", organized by the Cypriot "Must Magazine".

Year	Nominee / work	Award	Result
2011	Despina Vandi	Best Greek style icon	Won

== Oriflame Directors' Seminar Awards ==
Despina Vandi has won one award from one nomination.

Year	Nominee / work	Award	Result
2010	Despina Vandi	Beauty & Business Face of the Year	Won

== Pop Corn Music Awards ==
The Greek Pop Corn Music Awards are a defunct awards ceremony that were the first official Greek music awards show from 1992-2001 and were organized by the Greek magazine Pop Corn. The Arion Music Awards became the new national music awards ceremony in 2001 after the Pop Corns were discontinued. Despina Vandi has received seven awards from fourteen nominations.

Year	Nominee / work	Award	Result
1997	Despina Vandi	Best Female Artist	Nominated
1998	Despina Vandi	Best Female Stage Presence	Nominated
1998	Despina Vandi	Best Female Artist	Nominated
1998	Thelo Na Se Ksehaso	Best Female Interpretation	Nominated
1999	Despina Vandi	Best Female Artist	Won
1999	Despina Vandi	Best Female Stage Presence	Won
1999	Katalliles Proipothesis feat. Giorgos Lempesis	Best Duet	Nominated
1999	Oute Ena Efharisto	Best Female Interpretation	Won
1999	Oute Ena Efharisto	Best Video Clip (Dimitris Sotas)	Nominated
2000	Profities	Best Album	Won
2000	Apapa	Best Laiko Song	Won
2001	Despina Vandi	Best Female Singer	Won
2001	Despina Vandi	Best Female Stage Presence	Won
2001	Gia	Best Song	Won

== Rádio Nova Era Awards ==
Despina Vandi has won one award from one nomination.

Year	Nominee / work	Award	Result
2004	Despina Vandi	Best international dance artist for the year 2004	Won

== Star Radio Awards ==
Despina Vandi has won one award from one nomination.

Year	Nominee / work	Award	Result
2003	Despina Vandi, Gia	Best International Artist	Won

== World Music Awards ==
The World Music Award is an international awards show founded in 1989 that annually honors recording artists based on worldwide sales figures provided by the International Federation of the Phonographic Industry (IFPI). The awards show is conducted under the patronage of H.S.H. Prince Albert of Monaco, Monte-Carlo.

The show is broadcast to North and South America, all of Europe, the Middle East, Japan and South East Asia, all of China, some other parts of Asia, Australia, New Zealand, and all of Africa, reaching an estimated worldwide audience of around one billion viewers, in over 160 countries.

The regional awards, as many of the other awards, are not awarded standard annually, but when it is believed that the artist has sold a notable number of records in his or her respective category or genre. Despina Vandi has won one award from one nomination.

Year	Nominee / work	Award	Result
2004	Despina Vandi	World's Best-Selling Greek Artist	Won

== Other honours ==
- In 2001, Vandi received an honorary award from Richard Branson of Virgin for the sales of her single "Ipofero", which was recognized as the best-selling single in history at the Greek Virgin Megastores after surpassing sales of 100 thousand copies and being certified five times platinum by IFPI Greece.
- In 2003, Vandi was voted as the Best-Dressed Woman in Showbiz in a competition held by MAD TV. She was one of only two musicians honoured, the other being Sakis Rouvas.
- In December 2009, Down Town featured Vandi in its "Best of the Decade" issue.
- On 14 March 2010, Alpha TV ranked her the fourth top-certified Greek female artist by IFPI Greece during the phonographic era (since 1960).
