= Despina Vandi Live =

Despina Vandi: Live

Live album by Despina Vandi
- Released: December 17, 2003
- Recorded: 2003
- Genres: Contemporary laïka, laïka, dance-pop
- Length: 2:11:59
- Language: Greek
- Label: Heaven Music
- Producer: Phoebus

Despina Vandi chronology
| Gia & Ante Gia Collector's Edition (2002) | Despina Vandi: Live (2003) | Dance (2004) |

Singles from Despina Vandi Live
- 1. "O,ti Onirevomoun" Released: October 2003; 2. "Fevgoume Kardia Mou" Released: February 2004; 3. "Giati Fovase" Released: 2004

Despina Vandi Live is the first live album and seventh album overall by Greek singer Despina Vandi. It was released in 2003 by Heaven Music and it sold 60.000 units ang went platinum. It includes recordings from her sold-out live concert in Lycabettus theatre in Athens.

== Track listing ==
Disc One: Original edition
| No. | Title | Lyrics | Music | Length |
|---|---|---|---|---|
| 1. | "Fevgoume Kardia Mou" (Φεύγουμε καρδιά μου) | Phoebus | Phoebus | 2:57 |
| 2. | "Intro - I Melodia Tis Monaksias - Gia" (Intro - Η μελωδία της μοναξιάς - Γειά) | Phoebus | Phoebus | 2:09 |
| 3. | "Ola Odigoun S' Esena" (Όλα οδηγούν σ' εσένα) | Giannis Rentoumis | Phoebus | 2:49 |
| 4. | "Ah Kardoula Mou" (Αχ καρδούλα μου) | Phoebus | Phoebus | 2:38 |
| 5. | "Nihtolouloudo" (Νυχτολούλουδο) | Phoebus | Phoebus | 3:47 |
| 6. | "Sta 'Dosa Ola" (Στα 'δωσα όλα) | Phoebus | Phoebus | 2:46 |
| 7. | "A Pa Pa" (Α πα πα) | Phoebus | Phoebus | 1:02 |
| 8. | "Perittos" (Περιττός) | Phoebus | Phoebus | 1:39 |
| 9. | "Anavis Foties" (Ανάβεις φωτιές) | Phoebus | Phoebus | 2:41 |
| 10. | "Lipame" (Λυπάμαι) | Phoebus | Phoebus | 1:54 |
| 11. | "Lathos Anthropos" (Λάθος άνθρωπος) | Phoebus | Phoebus | 2:50 |
| 12. | "Gia" (Γειά) | Phoebus | Phoebus | 3:12 |
| 13. | "Ipofero" (Υποφέρω) | Phoebus | Phoebus | 1:50 |
| 14. | "Thelo Na Se Do" (Θέλω να σε δω) | Natalia Germanou | Phoebus | 3:55 |
| 15. | "Horis Esena" (Χωρίς εσένα) | Yiannis Parios | Phoebus | 3:51 |
| 16. | "Thimisou - Remix" (Θυμήσου - Remix) | Vaggelis Konstantinidis, Phoebus | Phoebus | 4:42 |
| 17. | "Ftino Ksenodohio" (Φτηνό ξενοδοχείο) | Phoebus | Phoebus | 2:54 |
| 18. | "Simera" (Σήμερα) | Phoebus | Phoebus | 3:30 |
| 19. | "O,ti Onirevomoun" (Ό,τι ονειρευόμουν) | Phoebus | Phoebus | 3:28 |
| 20. | "Ela" (Έλα) | Natalia Germanou | Phoebus | 3:57 |
| 21. | "To Koritsaki Sou" (Το κοριτσάκι σου) | Phoebus | Phoebus | 3:47 |
| Total length: | | | | 1:02:18 |

Disc Two: Original edition
| No. | Title | Lyrics | Music | Length |
|---|---|---|---|---|
| 1. | "Deste Mou Ta Matia" (Δέστε μου τα μάτια) | Phoebus | Phoebus | 1:28 |
| 2. | "Pote Voudas Pote Koudas" (Πότε Βούδας πότε Κούδας) | Manolis Rasoulis | Petros Vagiopoulos | 1:58 |
| 3. | "Gianta / Ela Na Pame S' Ena Meros / Ikariotiko / Horepsete-Horepsete" (Γιάντα / Έλα να πάμε σ' ένα μέρος / Ικαριώτικο / Χορέψετε-χορέψετε) | Nikos Oikonomidis / Giorgos Konitopoulos / Giorgos Konitopoulos / Giorgos Konitopoulos | Traditional Apeiranthos Naxos / Giorgos Konitopoulos / Giorgos Konitopoulos / Giorgos Konitopoulos | 3:40 |
| 4. | "Apopse Stis Akrogialies - Mpakse Tsifliki / Hatzikiriakio / Gia Ta Matia P' Agapo" (Απόψε στις ακρογιαλιές / Μπαξέ τσιφλίκι / Χατζηκυριάκειο / Για τα μάτια π' αγαπώ) | Vassilis Tsitsanis / Vassilis Tsitsanis / Dimitris Gkogkos / Vassilis Tsitsanis | Vassilis Tsitsanis / Vassilis Tsitsanis / Dimitris Gkogkos / Vassilis Tsitsanis | 2:56 |
| 5. | "Sala Sala" (Σάλα σάλα) | Traditional Smyrna | Traditional Smyrna | 2:14 |
| 6. | "Katse Kala / Pou 'Ne Ta Hronia" (Κάτσε καλά / Πού 'ναι τα χρόνια) | Christos Nikolopoulos, Aris Davarakis / Akos Daskalopoulos | Christos Nikolopoulos, Aris Davarakis / Stavros Kouyioumtzis | 1:55 |
| 7. | "Kamaroula Mia Stalia / Aporo An Esthanese Tipsis" (Καμαρούλα μια σταλιά / Απορώ αν αισθάνεσαι τύψεις) | Lefteris Papadopoulos / Phoebus | Mimis Plessas / Phoebus | 1:58 |
| 8. | "Agriolouloudo" (Αγριολούλουδο) | Pythagoras | Christos Nikolopoulos | 2:28 |
| 9. | "Tha Pio Apopse To Feggari / Mia Fora Monaha Ftani / Ti Gliko Na S' Agapoun" (Θα πιω απόψε το φεγγάρι / Μια φορά μονάχα φτάνει / Τι γλυκό να σ' αγαπούν) | Lefteris Papadopoulos / Kostas Kindinis / Lefteris Papadopoulos | Mimis Plessas / Giannis Spanos / Giorgos Zampetas | 3:19 |
| 10. | "Istoria Mou" (Ιστορία μου) | Giorgos Manisalis, Kostas Psichogios | Giorgos Manisalis, Kostas Psichogios | 3:13 |
| 11. | "Nihta Stasou / Pali Tha Klapso / Pia Nihta S' Eklepse" (Νύχτα στάσου / Πάλι θα κλάψω / Ποιά νύχτα σ' έκλεψε) | Pythagoras / Nakis Petridis, Sevi Tiliakou / Lefteris Papadopoulos | Christos Nikolopoulos / Nakis Petridis, Sevi Tiliakou / Mimis Plessas | 4:28 |
| 12. | "Giati Fovase" (Γιατί φοβάσαι) | Pythagoras | Stélios Vlavianós, R. Konstantinos | 2:41 |
| 13. | "Ena Proino" (Ένα πρωινό) | Giorgos Papastefanou | Stavros Xarchakos | 3:28 |
| 14. | "Me To Idio Mako" (Με το ίδιο μακό) | Lina Nikolakopoulou | Antonis Mitzelos | 4:08 |
| 15. | "Apopse Leo Na Min Kimithoume" (Απόψε λέω να μην κοιμηθούμε) | Pantelis Thalassinos, Giannis Nikolaou | Pantelis Thalassinos, Giannis Nikolaou | 2:40 |
| 16. | "Liomeno Pagoto" (Λιωμένο παγωτό) | Pavlos Pavlidis | Pavlos Pavlidis | 2:07 |
| 17. | "Poso Se Thelo" (Πόσο σε θέλω) | Giannis Bach - Spiropoulos | Termites | 2:18 |
| 18. | "Ola S' Agapane" (Όλα σ' αγαπάνε) | Spiros Giatras | Alekos Chrisovergis, Irene Chrisovergi | 3:47 |
| 19. | "S' Akoloutho" (Σ' ακολουθώ) | Manos Loïzos | Manos Loïzos | 3:26 |
| 20. | "Ola Se Thimizoun" (Όλα σε θυμίζουν) | Manolis Rasoulis | Manos Loïzos | 1:51 |
| 21. | "Ta Isiha Vradia" (Τα ήσυχα βράδια) | Lakis Papadopoulos, Marianina Kriezi | Lakis Papadopoulos, Marianina Kriezi | 2:54 |
| 22. | "Mi Mou Thimonis Matia Mou / Sta 'Dosa Ola" (Μη μου θυμώνεις μάτια μου / Στα 'δωσα όλα) | Stavros Kouyioumtzis / Phoebus | Stavros Kouyioumtzis / Phoebus | 3:49 |
| 23. | "Fevgoume Kardia Mou (Akoustiki Version)" (Φεύγουμε καρδιά μου (Ακουστική Version)) | Phoebus | Phoebus | 2:56 |
| 24. | "O,ti Onirevomoun (Remix)" (Ό,τι ονειρευόμουν (Remix)) | Phoebus | Phoebus | 3:59 |
| Total length: | | | | 1:09:41 |

Disc One: Turkish edition
| No. | Title | Lyrics | Music | Length |
|---|---|---|---|---|
| 1. | "Come Along Now (Phoebus feat. Despina Vandi)" | Phoebus | Phoebus | 3:51 |
| 2. | "Opa Opa" | Giorgos Alkaios, Freeman, Reith, Raith, Boss | Giorgos Alkaios | 3:20 |
| 3. | "Fevgoume Kardia Mou" | Phoebus | Phoebus | 2:57 |
| 4. | "Intro - I Melodia Tis Monaksias - Gia" | Phoebus | Phoebus | 2:09 |
| 5. | "Ola Odigoun Se S'Ena" | Giannis Rentoumis | Phoebus | 2:49 |
| 6. | "Ah Kardoula Mou" | Phoebus | Phoebus | 2:38 |
| 7. | "Nihtolouloudo" | Phoebus | Phoebus | 3:47 |
| 8. | "Sta Dosa Ola" | Phoebus | Phoebus | 2:46 |
| 9. | "A Pa Pa" | Phoebus | Phoebus | 1:02 |
| 10. | "Peritos" | Phoebus | Phoebus | 1:39 |
| 11. | "Anavis Foties" | Phoebus | Phoebus | 2:41 |
| 12. | "Lipame" | Phoebus | Phoebus | 1:54 |
| 13. | "Lathos Anthropos" | Phoebus | Phoebus | 2:50 |
| 14. | "Gia" | Phoebus | Phoebus | 3:12 |
| 15. | "Ipofero" | Phoebus | Phoebus | 1:50 |
| 16. | "Thelo Na Se Do" | Natalia Germanou | Phoebus | 3:55 |
| 17. | "Horis Esena" | Yiannis Parios | Phoebus | 3:51 |
| 18. | "Thimisou - Remix" | Vaggelis Konstantinidis, Phoebus | Phoebus | 4:42 |
| 19. | "Ftino Ksenodohio" | Phoebus | Phoebus | 2:54 |
| 20. | "Simera" | Phoebus | Phoebus | 3:30 |
| 21. | "Oti Onirevomoun" | Phoebus | Phoebus | 3:28 |
| 22. | "Ela" | Natalia Germanou | Phoebus | 3:57 |
| 23. | "To Koritsaki Sou" | Phoebus | Phoebus | 3:47 |
| Total length: | | | | 1:09:29 |

Disc Two: Turkish edition
| No. | Title | Lyrics | Music | Length |
|---|---|---|---|---|
| 1. | "Deste Mou Ta Matia" | Phoebus | Phoebus | 1:28 |
| 2. | "Pote Voudas Pote Koudas" | Manolis Rasoulis | Petros Vagiopoulos | 1:58 |
| 3. | "Gianta / Ela Na Pame S' Ena Meros / Ikariotiko / Horepste-Horepste" | Nikos Oikonomidis / Giorgos Konitopoulos / Giorgos Konitopoulos / Giorgos Konitopoulos | Traditional Apeiranthos Naxos / Giorgos Konitopoulos / Giorgos Konitopoulos / Giorgos Konitopoulos | 3:40 |
| 4. | "Apopse Stis Akrogialies - Bakse Tsifliki / Hatzikiriakio / Gia Ta Matia Pou Agapo" | Vassilis Tsitsanis / Vassilis Tsitsanis / Dimitris Gkogkos / Vassilis Tsitsanis | Vassilis Tsitsanis / Vassilis Tsitsanis / Dimitris Gkogkos / Vassilis Tsitsanis | 2:56 |
| 5. | "Sala Sala" | Traditional Smyrna | Traditional Smyrna | 2:14 |
| 6. | "Katse Kala / Pou Ne Ta Hronia" | Christos Nikolopoulos, Aris Davarakis / Akos Daskalopoulos | Christos Nikolopoulos, Aris Davarakis / Stavros Kouyioumtzis | 1:55 |
| 7. | "Kamaroula Mia Stalia / Aporo An Estanese Tipsis" | Lefteris Papadopoulos / Phoebus | Mimis Plessas / Phoebus | 1:58 |
| 8. | "Agriolouloudo" | Pythagoras | Christos Nikolopoulos | 2:28 |
| 9. | "Tha Pio Apopse To Fegari / Mia Fora Monaha Ftani / Ti Gliko Na S' Agapoun" | Lefteris Papadopoulos / Kostas Kindinis / Lefteris Papadopoulos | Mimis Plessas / Giannis Spanos / Giorgos Zampetas | 3:19 |
| 10. | "Istoria Mou" | Giorgos Manisalis, Kostas Psichogios | Giorgos Manisalis, Kostas Psichogios | 3:13 |
| 11. | "Nihta Stasou / Pali Tha Klapso / Pia Nihta S' Eklepse" | Pythagoras / Nakis Petridis, Sevi Tiliakou / Lefteris Papadopoulos | Christos Nikolopoulos / Nakis Petridis, Sevi Tiliakou / Mimis Plessas | 4:28 |
| 12. | "Giati Fovase" | Pythagoras | Stélios Vlavianós, R. Konstantinos | 2:41 |
| 13. | "Ena Proino" | Giorgos Papastefanou | Stavros Xarchakos | 3:28 |
| 14. | "Me To Idio Mako" | Lina Nikolakopoulou | Antonis Mitzelos | 4:08 |
| 15. | "Apopse Leo Na Min Kimithoume" | Pantelis Thalassinos, Giannis Nikolaou | Pantelis Thalassinos, Giannis Nikolaou | 2:40 |
| 16. | "Liomeno Pagoto" | Pavlos Pavlidis | Pavlos Pavlidis | 2:07 |
| 17. | "Poso Se Thelo" | Giannis Bach - Spiropoulos | Termites | 2:18 |
| 18. | "Ola S' Agapane" | Spiros Giatras | Alekos Chrisovergis, Irene Chrisovergi | 3:47 |
| 19. | "S' Akoloutho" | Manos Loïzos | Manos Loïzos | 3:26 |
| 20. | "Ola Se Thimizoun" | Manolis Rasoulis | Manos Loïzos | 1:51 |
| 21. | "Ta Isiha Vradia" | Lakis Papadopoulos, Marianina Kriezi | Lakis Papadopoulos, Marianina Kriezi | 2:54 |
| 22. | "Mi Mou Thimonis Matia Mou / Sta Dosa Ola" | Stavros Kouyioumtzis / Phoebus | Stavros Kouyioumtzis / Phoebus | 3:49 |
| 23. | "Fevgoume Kardia Mou (Acoustic Version)" | Phoebus | Phoebus | 2:56 |
| 24. | "Oti Onirevomoun (Remix)" | Phoebus | Phoebus | 3:40 |
| Total length: | | | | 1:09:22 |

== Release history ==
| Region | Date | Label | Format | Version |
|---|---|---|---|---|
| Greece | December 17, 2003 | Heaven | CD, digital download | Original |
| Cyprus | December 17, 2003 | Heaven | CD, digital download | Original |
| Turkey | 2004 | Mega Müzik | CD, MC | Turkish edition |

== Charts ==
| Chart | Peak position | Weeks | Certification |
|---|---|---|---|
| Greek Albums Chart | 1 | 58 | Platinum |
| Cypriot Album Chart | 1 | | Platinum |
| Turkish Album Chart | 1 | | Gold |

== Credits and personnel ==
Personnel

- Christina Argiri - background vocals
- Vasilis Diamantis - clarinet
- Akis Diximos - second vocals
- Giorgos Florakis - background vocals
- Nektarios Georgiadis - background vocals
- Antonis Gounaris - guitars (acoustic, twelve-strings, classic, electric)
- Nikos Halkousis - remix
- Rolland Hoffman - flamengo guitar
- Tony Kontaxakis - conducting, guitars (electric, acoustic)
- Giannis Koutsouflakis - remix
- Trifon Koutsourelis - keys
- Giannis Mpithikotsis - bouzouki, baglama, tzoura
- Alex Panayi - background vocals
- Andreas Papadopoulos - keys
- Phoebus - music, lyrics, keyboards, background vocals, programming, orchestration
- Kostas Platakis - bouzouki
- Manolis Platakis - guitars (electric)
- Giorgos Roilos - percussion, timpani
- Andreas Siderakis - drums
- Nikos Stavropoulos - bouzouki
- Vasilis Tassopoulos - percussion
- Vasilis Theodorakoglou - keys
- Petros Triantafillopoulos - bass
- Despina Vandi - vocals
- Martha Zioga - background vocals

Production

- Antonis Gounaris - sound, computer editing, additional programming and orchestrations
- Giannis Ioannidis - mastering
- Trifon Koutsourelis - orchestration, programming
- Lefteris Neromiliotis - mix
- Giannis Nikolakopoulos - assistant sound engineering
- Akis Pashalakis - assistant sound engineering
- Panagiotis Petronikolos - sound, sound recording studio, mix
- Phoebus - production management, orchestration
- Vaggelis Siapatis - sound recording studio, computer editing
- Giorgos Stampolis - production, computer editing
- Fanis Tsirakis - computer editing
- Christos Zorbas - technical officer recording

Design

- Menelaos Mirillas - live photos
- Konstantina Psomadaki - art direction

Credits adapted from the album's liner notes.
