= Despina Vandi discography =

- Studio albums: 12
- Extended plays: 5
- Soundtrack albums: 1
- Live albums: 1
- Compilation albums: 26
- Singles: 82
- Video albums: 6
- Music videos: 80
- Collaboratibe albums: 1
- Promotional compilation albums: 8
- Reissue albums: 5

Despina Vandi began a musical career in 1994 after signing with Minos EMI. She released two albums with little success, Gela Mou (1994) and Esena Perimeno (1996), before beginning an exclusive collaboration with composer Phoebus, which would eventually become one of the most successful partnerships in Greek history, and striking commercial success with her third and fourth albums Deka Endoles (1997) and Profities (1999), the latter which reached multi-platinum status. In the 2000s, Vandi and Phoebus began experimenting with more contemporary, radio-friendly pop influences in combination with laiko repertoire to much initial success. Her single "Ipofero" (2000) became the best-selling Greek single of all time (Virgin Megastores); after the success Vandi and Phoebus signed to new-found independent label Heaven Music with Gia (2001) remaining the label's biggest sales success, and one of the biggest-selling albums of all time in Greece. For the sales of Gia, Vandi became the first of four artists recording in Greece to receive a World Music Award for "World's Best Selling Greek Artist". With Gia earning success in neighboring markets as well, Vandi embarked on a career abroad briefly to some mild success; she became the first Greek artist to chart on any Billboard chart, reaching number one on the Hot Dance Airplay Chart for 2 weeks and 39 on the Hot Dance Club Play chart. The next two international singles, "Come Along Now" and "Opa Opa", achieved worldwide recognition. "Come Along Now" was heard all around the world in Coca-Cola's ads, and "Opa Opa" reached number 3 on the Hot Dance Radio Airplay of Billboard. Vandi released her first live album in 2003 before taking a maternity leave after having her first child. During this time, both her former and current label released a number of compilations and video albums to capitalize on her recent marketability. Vandi returned with another multi-platinum record, Stin Avli Tou Paradeisou, before another maternity leave. 10 Hronia Mazi (2007) was released as a celebration of her 10-year collaboration with Phoebus. In 2009 Vandi and Phoebus announced that they were leaving Heaven Music in favor of a new label founded by Phoebus. The biggest music channel in Greece, MAD TV, in tribute to the 10 years since its foundation called Despina Vandi as the biggest female Greek star in Greek music. Vandi has sold over 1 million records.

== Albums ==
=== Studio albums ===
* denotes unknown or unavailable information.

List of solo studio albums, with selected chart positions, sales figures and certifications
Title	Details	Peak chart positions			Sales	Certifications
Title	Details	GRE	CYP	TUR	Sales	Certifications
Gela Mou	Released: 3 June 1994; Label: Minos EMI; Formats: LP, Cassette, CD, digital download	7	11	—	GRE:20.000	
Esena Perimeno	Released: 5 April 1996; Label: Minos EMI; Formats: LP, Cassette, CD	5	9	—	GRE:25.000	
Deka Endoles	Released: 10 December 1997; Label: Minos EMI; Formats: Cassette, CD, digital download	1	5	—	GRE: 100.000; CYP: 7,000	GRE: 2× Platinum; CYP: Platinum
Profities	Released: 8 December 1999; Label: Minos EMI; Formats: Cassette, CD, digital download	1	1	*	GRE: 150.000; CYP: 18,000	GRE: 3× Platinum; CYP: 3× Platinum
Gia	Released: 17 December 2001; Label: Heaven Music; Formats: Cassette, CD	1	1	1	GRE: 280.000; CYP: 24.000; TUR: 100,000	GRE: 5× Platinum; CYP: 4× Platinum; TUR: Gold
Stin Avli Tou Paradeisou	Released: 20 December 2004; Label: Heaven Music; Formats: CD	1	6	*	GRE: 110,000; CYP: 10.000	GRE: 2× Platinum; CYP: Platinum
10 Hronia Mazi	Released: 5 December 2007; Label: Heaven Music; Formats: CD, digital download	3	4	*	GRE: 47.000; CYP: 10.000	GRE: Platinum; CYP: Platinum
C'est La Vie	Released: 13 June 2010; Label: Spicy Music; Formats: CD, LP, digital download	*	*	*	GRE: 132.000; CYP: 16.000	GRE: 11× Platinum; CYP: 2× Platinum
Allaxa	Released: 27 April 2012; Label: Spicy Music; Formats: CD, digital download	1	*	*	GRE: 30.000; CYP: 10.000	GRE: 2× Platinum; CYP: Platinum
De Me Stamatises	Released: 22 December 2014; Label: Heaven Music; Formats: CD, digital download	2	*	*	GRE: 12.000; CYP: 6.000	GRE: Platinum; CYP: Platinum
Afti Einai I Diafora Mas	Released: 6 October 2016; Label: Heaven Music; Formats: CD, digital download	1	*	*	GRE: 10.000	GRE: Gold
To Diko Mou Cinema	Released: 17 July 2019; Label: Panik Records; Formats: CD, digital download	5	*	*		

=== Live albums ===
Title	Details	Peak chart positions			Sales	Certifications
Title	Details	GRE	CYP	TUR	Sales	Certifications
Despina Vandi Live	Released: 17 December 2003; Label: Heaven Music; Formats: CD, digital download	1	1	1	GRE: 60.000; CYP: 6.000; TUR: 100,000	GRE: Platinum; CYP: Platinum; TUR: Gold

=== Reissues ===
Title	Details
Gia & Ante Gia: Collector's Edition	Released: 21 March 2002; Label: Heaven Music; Formats: CD, digital download
Gia: US Edition	Released: 7 September 2004; Labels: Ultra Records, Heaven Music; Formats: CD, digital download
Stin Avli Tou Paradeisou: Special Edition	Released: 7 December 2005; Label: Heaven Music; Formats: CD, digital download
10 Hronia Mazi: It's Destiny	Released: 24 June 2008; Label: Heaven Music; Formats: CD, digital download
C'est La Vie	Released: 29 June 2010; Label: Heaven Music; Formats: CD, digital download

=== Soundtrack albums ===
Title	Details
Mulan	Released: June 1998; Label: Minos EMI; Formats: CD, cassette

=== Collaborative albums ===
Title	Details
Duets Live (with Anna Vissi)	Released: 15 February 2021; Label: Panik Records; Formats: Digital download

== Extended plays ==
Title	Details
Ipofero	Released: 13 December 2000; Label: Minos EMI; Formats: CD, digital download
Ante Gia	Released: 18 December 2002; Label: Heaven Music; Formats: CD, digital download
Come Along Now	Released: 24 June 2004; Label: Heaven Music; Formats: CD, digital download
Kalanta	Released: 21 November 2006; Label: Heaven Music; Formats: CD, digital download
Ola Ksanarhizoune M' Emena	Released: 21 October 2022; Label: Panik Records; Formats: Digital download

== Compilation albums ==
=== International compilation albums ===
Title	Details
Despina Vandi	Released: 2004; Label: Megaliner Records; Formats: CD
Hot Hits & Remixes	Released: 2004; Label: Megaliner Records; Formats: CD
OpaOpa	Released: 2004; Label: Одиссей; Formats: CD, cassette
Come Along Now	Released: 25 January 2005; Labels: Ultra Records, Heaven Music; Formats: CD, digital download
The Very Best of Despina Vandi	Released: 2005; Label: EMI-Kent Elektronik San. ve Tic.; Formats: CD, cassette
Nymphea	Released: 2005; Labels: Megaliner Records, Heaven Music; Formats: CD
Live Volume 1	Released: 2005; Labels: KA Music, Heaven Music; Formats: CD, cassette
New & Best: Despina Vandi	Released: 2005; Labels: Formats: CD
Даёшь Музыку MP3 Collection: Despina Vandi	Released: 2006; Label: Star Records; Formats: CD
All Stars: Despina Vandi	Released: 2007; Label: Formats: CD
Play MP3: Despina Vandi	Released: 2007; Label: Sound Plus; Formats: CD
MPTree: Despina Vandi 2008	Released: 2007; Label: Formats: CD
Destiny	Released: 2009; Label: Roton Music; Formats: CD

=== Greek compilation albums ===
Title	Details
The Best	Released: 15 October 2001; Label: Minos EMI; Formats: CD, cassette, digital download
Ballads	Released: 20 September 2004; Label: Minos EMI; Formats: CD, digital download
Dance	Released: 20 September 2004; Label: Minos EMI; Formats: CD, digital download
Ta Laïka Tis Despinas	Released: 2005; Label: Minos EMI; Formats: CD, digital download
Despina Vandi	Box set; Released: 2005; Label: Minos EMI; Formats: CD
14 Megala Tragoudia	Released: 23 March 2006; Label: Minos EMI; Formats: CD, digital download
Singles	Released: 12 December 2006; Label: Minos EMI; Formats: CD, digital download
The EMI Years: The Complete Collection	Box set; Released: 16 May 2007; Label: Minos EMI; Formats: CD, digital download
The Best	Released: 2008; Label: Minos EMI; Formats: CD
Greatest Hits: 2001–2009	Released: 12 December 2009; Label: Heaven Music; Formats: CD, CD/DVD, digital download
Best of Despina Vandi	Released: 16 August 2016; Label: Heaven Music; Formats: Digital download
Best Of & Spicy Remixes	Released: 26 November 2018; Label: Spicy Music; Formats: Digital download
Sta Dosa Ola	Released: 19 August 2020; Label: Minos EMI; Formats: Digital download

=== Promotional compilation albums ===
Title	Details
Despina Vandi	Released: 2006; Label: Minos EMI; Formats: CD single; Source: Proto Thema (newspaper)
Chrisi Diskothiki	Released: 2006; Label: Minos EMI; Formats: CD; Source: Espresso (newspaper)
Monadikes Erminies	Released: 2007; Label: Minos EMI; Formats: CD; Source: Eleftheros Typos (newspaper)
The Best Collection	Released: 2008; Label: Minos EMI; Formats: CD; Source: TV Zapping (magazine)
4 Afthentika CD	Released: 24 May 2009 – 14 June 2009; Label: Heaven Music; Formats: CD; Source: Ethnos (newspaper)
Best Of	Released: 20 September 2009 – 11 October 2009; Label: Minos EMI; Formats: CD; Source: Real News (newspaper)
Best Of	Released: 29 May 2015; Label: Minos EMI; Formats: CD; Source: Ependisi (newspaper)
Best Of	Released: 6 September 2015; Label: Heaven Music; Formats: CD; Source: Freddo (newspaper)

== Singles ==
=== As lead artist ===
The following are either CD singles, maxi singles, or EPs, all of which chart on the Singles Chart in Greece. In Greece and Cyprus singles are usually only released as radio singles rather than physical releases.

Title	Year	Peak chart positions										Certifications	Album
Title	Year	GRE	AUS	BEL	FIN	GER	NLD	ROM	SWE	UK	US Dance	Certifications	Album
"Spania"	1998	1	—	—	—	—	—	—	—	—	—	GRE: Platinum	Profities
"Ipofero"	2000	1	—	—	—	—	—	—	—	—	—	GRE: 6× Platinum	Ipofero
"Ante Gia"	2002	1	—	—	—	—	—	—	—	—	—	GRE: 2× Platinum	Gia
"Gia"	2003	1	35	42	20	36	55	8	25	63	1	GRE: Gold	Gia
"Come Along Now"	2004	1	—	—	—	—	—	13	—	—	—	GRE: Platinum	Come Along Now
"Opa Opa"	2004	1	82	— (Note: "Opa Opa" did not enter the Flemish Ultratop chart, but peaked at number five on the Ultratip chart.)	—	51	—	—	—	—	3		Come Along Now
"Giati Fovase"	2004	—	—	—	—	—	—	—	—	—	—		Despina Vandi Live
"Kalanta"	2006	1	—	—	—	—	—	—	—	—	—	GRE: 2× Platinum	Kalanta
"—" denotes a title that did not chart, or was not released in that territory.

=== As featured artist ===
Year	Single	Album
1996	"Se Sighoro" (Yiannis Parios feat. Despina Vandi)	I Monaxia Mes' Ap' Ta Matia Mou
1999	"Katalliles Proipothesis" (Giorgos Lembesis feat. Despina Vandi)	Exartisi
2002	"Eflekta Ilika" (Tolis Voskopoulos feat. Despina Vandi)	I Sosti Apantisi
2002	"Akoma Mia Fora Mazi" (Tolis Voskopoulos feat. Despina Vandi)	I Sosti Apantisi
2008	"Destiny" (Schiller mit Despina Vandi)	Sehnsucht/Desire
2010	"Sunday" (Schiller with Despina Vandi)	C'est La Vie
2015	"Anatreptika" (Antonis Remos, Despina Vandi, Melina Aslanidou & Stavento)	"Anatreptika" single

=== Full singles discography ===
Listed below are promo singles released by radio and music video by Despina Vandi. They were not released as stand-alone CDs, as is common in Greece and Cyprus.

Year	Title	Album/CD single
1994	"Gela Mou"	Gela Mou
1994	"Den Iparhi Tipota"	Gela Mou
1994	"To Adiexodo"	Gela Mou
1996	"Esena Perimeno"	Esena Perimeno
1996	"Den Pethainei I Agapi"	Esena Perimeno
1997	"O Perittos"	Deka Entoles
1998	"Nyhtolouloudo Mou"	Deka Entoles
1998	"Deka Entoles"	Deka Entoles
1998	"Thelo Na Se Ksehaso"	Deka Entoles
1998	"To Allo Miso"	Deka Entoles
1998	"Spania"	Profities
1999	"Profities"	Profities
2000	"To Koritsaki Sou"	Profities
2000	"Giatriko"	Profities
2000	"Apapa"	Profities
2000	"Sta 'Dosa Ola"	Profities
2000	"Ipofero"	Ipofero
2001	"Lypamai"	Ipofero
2001	"Gia"	Gia
2001	"Hristougenna"	Gia
2002	"Lathos Anthropos"	Gia
2002	"Anaveis Foties"	Gia
2002	"Olo Leipeis"	Gia
2002	"Ela"	Gia
2002	"Thelo Na Se Do"	Gia
2003	"Simera"	Gia (US Edition) + Ante Gia
2003	"I Melodia Tis Monaksias"	Gia (US Edition) + Ante Gia
2003	"Gia" (English Version)	Gia (US Edition)
2003	"Thimisou"	Gia (US Edition)
2003	"Oti Oneirevomoun"	Despina Vandi: Live
2003	"Fevgoume Kardia Mou"	Despina Vandi: Live
2004	"Come Along Now" (feat. Phoebus)	Come Along Now
2004	"Opa Opa"	Gia (US Edition)
2004	"Happy End"	Stin Avli Tou Paradisou
2005	"Na Tin Hairesai"	Stin Avli Tou Paradisou
2005	"Stin Avli Tou Paradisou"	Stin Avli Tou Paradisou
2005	"Jambi"	Stin Avli Tou Paradisou: Special Edition
2006	"Amane" (feat. Giorgos Mazonakis)	Stin Avli Tou Paradisou: Special Edition
2006	"Kalanta"	Kalanta
2006	"Mehri Mai Mina"	Kalanta
2007	"Thelo"	10 Hronia Mazi
2007	"10 Hronia Mazi"	10 Hronia Mazi
2008	"Agapi"	10 Hronia Mazi
2008	"Fantasou Apla"	10 Hronia Mazi
2008	"I Gi Ki I Selini" (MAD Video Music Awards 2008)	10 Hronia Mazi
2008	"Destiny" (Schiller ft Despina Vandi)	10 Hronia Mazi: It's Destiny
2008	"Tha' Thela" (Love Radio Live)	10 Hronia Mazi
2009	"Iparhi Zoi"	Greatest Hits 2001-2009
2010	"Koritsi Prama"	C'est La Vie
2010	"Sunday" (Schiller with Despina Vandi)	C'est La Vie
2010	"Kommati Ap' Tin Kardia Sou"	C'est La Vie
2010	"Erota Theli I Zoi"	C'est La Vie
2010	"Kommati Ap' Tin Kardia Sou (Remix)"	C'est La Vie
2010	"Erota Theli I Zoi (Remix)" (feat. Ipohthonios)	C'est La Vie
2011	"Gi' Alli Mia Fora "	C'est La Vie
2011	"Mou 'His Perasi"	Allaxa
2012	"Girismata"	Allaxa
2012	"To Nisi"	Allaxa
2012	"T' Asteri Mou"	Allaxa
2012	"Katalaveno"	Allaxa
2012	"Mou Ftiahnis Ti Mera"	Allaxa
2012	"To Ligo Sou Na Zo"	Allaxa
2012	"Allaxa"	Allaxa
2013	"Otan Perasi Afti I Nihta"	
2013	"Hano Esena"	De Me Stamatises
2014	"Kalimera"	De Me Stamatises
2014	"Ola Allazoun"	De Me Stamatises
2014	"Kalimera (Summer Dance Mix)"	De Me Stamatises
2014	"Kane Kati"	De Me Stamatises
2015	"An Sou Leipo"	De Me Stamatises
2015	"Mia Anasa Makria Sou"	Afti Einai I Diafora Mas
2015	"To Maxilari"	Afti Einai I Diafora Mas
2016	"Gia Kaki Mou Tihi"	Afti Einai I Diafora Mas
2016	"Perasa Na Do"	Afti Einai I Diafora Mas
2017	"Afti Einai I Diafora Mas"	Afti Einai I Diafora Mas
2017	"Kati Pige Lathos"	Afti Einai I Diafora Mas
2017	"O,ti Thes Geniete Tora"	Afti Einai I Diafora Mas
2019	"I Kathe Nihta Fernei Fos"	
2020	"Ena Tsigaro Diadromi"	
2021	"Petra"	
2021	"Pou les"	
2022	"Ta kalokairia mou misa"	

== Album appearances ==
Year	Album	Single
1993	O Kiklos Tou Erota (Alexis Papadimitriou)	Gnorimia
1993	Ta Succès Tora	Ftei O Erotas

== Guest contributions ==
=== As vocalist ===
Year	Song	Artist	Album
1992		Vasilis Karras	Den Pao Pouthena
1993		Yiannis Parios	Panta Erotevmenos
1994		Aggelos Dionisiou	Fovame Mi Figis
1994	Ki Ego Sou Eksigo	Lampis Livieratos	Ipothesi Prosopiki
1995	Afti Pou Efige	Kiriakos Zoumboulakis	I Nihta Ti Zoi Mou Talantevi
1995	Prepi Na Sou Po	Kiriakos Zoumboulakis	I Nihta Ti Zoi Mou Talantevi
1996	I Anixi Den Meni Pia Edo	Thanos Kalliris	Monaha Tin Psihi Sou
1996	Den Tha Pas Pouthena	Notis Sfakianakis	5o Vima
1996	Me Ta Matia Milame	Notis Sfakianakis	5o Vima

== Videography ==
=== Video albums ===
Year	Video details
2003	The Video Collection: '97-'03: Released: 2003; Format: DVD; Label: Heaven
2004	Hits on DVD: Despina Vandi (1994-2000): Released: 2004; Format: DVD; Label: Minos EMI
2004	Despina Vandi Karaoke Vol.1: Released: 2004; Format: DVD; Label: Heaven
2007	MAD Secret Concerts: Despina Vandi Live: Released: 2007; Format: DVD; Label: Heaven
2008	Greek Hits: Giorgos Mazonakis vs. Despina Vandi: Released: 2008; Format: DVD; Label: Odyssey Company

=== Karaoke albums ===
Year	Title
2005	Karaoke CD + G: Released: 2005; Label: Heaven; Formats: CD

=== Music videos ===
Year	Title	Concept	Director
1994	"Gela Mou"	Vandi reminisces about good times she had with a lover driving down a road and playing at the beach, with the memories in black and white.	Vangelis Liberopoulos
1994	"Den Iparhi Tipota"	Vandi singing on an island beach and in front of a church.	Kostas Kapetanidis
1994	"To Adiexodo" (feat. Yiannis Parios)	A mostly black and white video of Vandi singing on a sidewalk and in her bed, featuring archive footage of Parios.	Kostas Kapetanidis
1996	"Efiges"	Vandi singing amongst various sights on an Agean island, featuring some black and white scenes.	Kostas Kapetanidis
1996	"Den Petheni I Agapi"	Vandi sings in a warehouse amongst foam in one scene and shows both good and bad times with a lover in another, using both some black and white and fluorescent scenes.	Kostas Kapetanidis
1996	"Esena Perimeno"	Vandi in a large empty house thinking about a lover riding a horse on the beach.	Giorgos Gavalos
1997	"O Perittos"	Vandi playing around in a hotel room, showering and getting ready to go out.	Vangelis Kalaïtzis
1997	"Nihtolouloudo Mou"	Vandi drives out to and sings in a forest at night to pick a flower.	Vangelis Kalaïtzis
1998	"Deka Endoles"	Vandi spying on her lover's potentially adulturous behaviour through a hidden camera.	Yorgos Lanthimos
1998	"Thelo Na Se Xehaso"	Vandi singing in a white background amongst roses.	Kostas Voridis
1998	"Spania"	A crime scene is revealed, while Vandi sings alone in some scenes and embraces and struggles with her lover in one scene with a fan blowing and in another in a car speeding down a road.	Kostas Kapetanidis
1998	"Oute Ena Efharisto"	Vandi as royalty walking through castle grounds	Dimitris Sotas
1999	"Katalliles Proipotheseis" (with Giorgos Lembesis)	A mostly black and white video with Lembesis and Vandi flirting and dancing around as the lead singers of a rock band.	Kostas Kapetanidis
1999	"Apapa"	Vandi pole dancing and posing in evening gowns amongst numerous formally dressed men who photograph her and attempt to get her attention.	Kostas Kapetanidis
1999	"Giatriko"	Vandi towering over and performing a choreographed dance sequence with a crew in a futuristic city	Kostas Kapetanidis
1999	"To Koritsaki Sou"	Vandi posing as a mannequin in a shop window and witnessing a couple arguing.	Kostas Kapetanidis
1999	"Sta 'Dosa Ola"	Footage from a live performance of the song.	Kostas Kapetanidis
2000	"Ipofero"	Vandi in various geographical/climate settings, including in Antarctica, ancient ruins, spider webs, and flames.	Kostas Kapetanidis
2000	"Lipame"	Vandi as a school girl alone in a classroom, eventually becoming enraged and throwing around the room's contents.	Kostas Kapetanidis
2001	"Gia"	Vandi and a crew of males dancing in an oriental temple while a young child searches for her.	Kostas Kapetanidis
2001	"Christougenna"	Vandi walking through a city during the holidays and admiring the decorations.	Kostas Kapetanidis
2002	"Anaveis Foties"/"Deste Mou Ta Matia"	Vandi bellydancing as part of the entertainment at a Middle Eastern festivity, attempting to attract the attention of a love interest.	Kostas Kapetanidis
2002	"Olo Lipeis"	Based solely on a closeup shot of Vandi singing.	Kostas Kapetanidis
2002	"Lathos Anthropos"	A partially black and white video following the lives of two women in abusive relationships, with Vandi playing on a television in the background, portraying a 1940s cabaret singer who suffers domestic abuse herself, although she eventually manages to escape from the relationship.	Kostas Kapetanidis
2002	"Thelo Na Se Do"	Vandi singing in an urban area at night.	Kostas Kapetanidis
2002	"Ela"		Kostas Kapetanidis
2002	"Simera"	Vandi dressed up as four different personas, eventually all meeting each other.	Kostas Kapetanidis
2003	"I Melodia Tis Monaxias"	After being involved in a car accident, Vandi has presumably died and has an out-of-body experience. She tries to contact her lover who is devastated over the news, before eventually returning to her body.	Kostas Kapetanidis
2003	"Gia"	Vandi watching a group of bellydancers at a festivity in Morocco and eventually joining in, focusing on a mysterious male on a black horse.	Kostas Kapetanidis
2003	"O,ti Onirevomoun" (Live)	Footage from the live performance of the song.	Kostas Kapetanidis
2003	"Fevgoume Kardia Mou"	Footage from a live performance. Additional footage is of Vandi driving in a car through Madrid and singing on top of a piano in a room full of moving boxes.	Kostas Kapetanidis
2004	"Giati Fovase"	Footage from the live performance of the song.	Kostas Kapetanidis
2004	"Come Along Now"	Vandi in a photoshoot, caught in an animal trap, and dancing in a club.	Kostas Kapetanidis
2004	"Opa Opa"	Vandi and others in a steam bath, resting on a bed of flowers with servers catering to her, on a boat, and dancing at a party.	Kostas Kapetanidis
2004	"Na Ti Herese"	Vandi catches her lover having an affair and has difficulty after seeing them in public together in the aftermath.	Kostas Kapetanidis
2004	"Happy End"	In a fast-paced city, Vandi lies on a rug as all four seasons pass by.	Kostas Kapetanidis
2004	"Stin Avli Tou Paradeisou"	In this animated video, Vandi gets ready in the morning, goes for a walk, and eventually meets her lover in the Garden of Eden.	Kostas Kapetanidis
2005	"I Believe It–Olo Lipeis"	A black and white video featuring Vandi in a black bodysuit posing over a large sphere.	Kostas Kapetanidis
2005	"Stin Avli Tou Paradeisou" (MAD VMA 2005)	Live performance of the song at the award show.	Kostas Kapetanidis
2005	"Jambi"	Vandi and dancers moving and posing in boxes, eventually followed by a full dance sequence in front of a white background and another with flashing lights.	Kostas Kapetanidis
2006	"Amane" (feat. Giorgos Mazonakis)	Vandi and her mother are at a dress fitting and try to surprise Vandi's partner (Mazonakis) and encourage him to marry her and have a family.	Nikos Soulis
2006	"Jambi" (MAD VMA 2006)	Live performance of the song at the awards show.	Kostas Kapetanidis
2006	"Kalanta"	Vandi has been kidnapped and trapped in a water tank by an obsessive female. The police eventual find the hideout and arrest the woman, but Vandi is retrieved unconscious.	Kostas Kapetanidis/Created by Phoebus
2007	"Mehri Mai Mina"	Vandi getting herself and her house ready for a Christmas celebration, waiting for her lover to arrive, but ending up disappointed when he does not show up.	Kostas Kapetanidis
2007	"Thelo"	Vandi singing as the frontwoman of a rock group as the set becomes engulfed in flames.	Kostas Kapetanidis/Created by Phoebus
2007	"Deka Hronia Mazi"	Vandi singing in a room with footage of couples who are celebrating anniversaries, all which eventually go to visit her.	Kostas Kapetanidis
2008	"Agapi"	Vandi singing amongst numerous rock musical instruments.	Kostas Kapetanidis
2008	"Fantasou Apla"	Vandi singing in front of a black background with fancy designs appearing around her. The image is shown on a screen in a busy city street.	Kostas Kapetanidis
2008	"I Gi Ki Selini" (MAD VMA 2008)	Live performance of the song at the award show	Kostas Kapetanidis
2008	"Destiny" (Schiller mit Despina Vandi)	Live performance of the song at the awards show.	Kostas Kapetanidis
2008	"Tha 'Thela" (Love Radio Live)	Live performance of the song.	Kostas Kapetanidis
2009	"Iparhi Zoi" (MAD VMA 2009)	Live performance of the song at the awards show with an added scene of Vandi looking in a mirror.	Kostas Kapetanidis
2010	"Koritsi Prama, Part 1"	Vandi singing at Diogenis Studio as a school girl.	Kostas Kapetanidis
2010	"Kommati Ap' Tin Kardia Sou"		Manolis Tzirakis
2010	"Kommati Ap' Tin Kardia Sou" (MAD VMA 2010)		Kostas Kapetanidis
2010	"Erota Thelei I Zoi"		Kostas Kapetanidis
2010	"Erota Thelei I Zoi (Remix)" (ft. Ipohthonios)		Kostas Kapetanidis
2010	"Christougenna 2010"		Manolis Tzirakis
2011	"Gia Alli Mia Fora" (MAD VMA 2011)		Kostas Kapetanidis
2011	"Mou 'His Perasi"		Kostas Kapetanidis
2012	"Girismata"		Kostas Kapetanidis
2012	"To Nisi"		Kostas Kapetanidis
2012	"Girismata + To Nisi + T' Asteri Mou" (MAD VMA 2012)		Kostas Kapetanidis
2012	"T' Asteri Mou"		Kostas Kapetanidis
2013	"Katalaveno"		Pillow Talk
2013	"Hano Esena"		Yiannis Papadakos
2014	"Ola Allazoun" (MAD VMA 2014)		Yiannis Papadakos
2014	"Ola Allazoun"		Yiannis Papadakos
2014	"Kane Kati"		Yiannis Papadakos
2015	"An Sou Lipo"		Kostas Kapetanidis
2015	"Ti Simasia Exei" (MAD VMA 2015)		Kostas Kapetanidis
2015	"Mia Anasa Makria Sou"		Yiannis Papadakos
2016	"Gia Kaki Mou Tihi"		Kostas Kapetanidis
2017	"O,ti Thes Geniete Tora"		Kostas Kapetanidis
2019	"I Kathe Nihta Fernei Fos"		Yiannis Papadakos
2020	"Ena Tsigaro Diadromi"		Kostas Karidas
2021	"Petra"		Kostas Karidas
2021	"Pou Les"		Kostas Karidas
2022	"Ta Kalokairia Mou Misa"		Kostas Karidas

== Appearances ==
=== Albums ===
Year	Album	Song	Label	Catalog#	Format	Country
2003	Various – Pioneer The Album Vol. 4	Gia [CD]	Blanco Y Negro	MXCD-1366	2×CD, DVD	Spain
2003	Various – Pioneer The Album Vol. 4	Gia (Greek Version) [DVD]	Blanco Y Negro	MXCD-1366	2×CD, DVD	Spain
2003	Various – Pioneer The Album Vol. 4	Gia (Greek Version) [DVD]	Blanco Y Negro	MXCD-1366	2×CD, DVD	Spain
2003	Various – Home 69	Gia (DJ Gregory Remix)	CLS Records	CLS SA0202	CD	Hungary
2003	Various – Chill Out in Paris 3	Gia (Said Mrad Remix)	George V Records	3087322	2×CD, Stereo	France
2004	Various – Dance Power 10	Opa Opa (Bigworld Radio Mix)	Vidisco	11.80.8369	2×CD	Portugal
2004	Various – Kula Karma	Gia	Ministry Of Sound	8662383	2×CD, Sampler	Germany
2005	Armand Van Helden - The Remixes Vol. 2	Opa Opa (Armand Van Helden Club Mix)	Disky Dance	DD 902707	CD, Digipak	Netherlands
2005	Various – DJ Masters Unmixed #3	Come Along Now (Edit)	Central Station	CSR CD 5253	3×CD	Australia
2005	Various – Wild Nights 4	Opa Opa [DVD]	Central Station	CSR CD 5252	2×CD, DVD, Gatefold	Australia
2008	Nick Skitz - Come Into My World	Gia (Skitz Clubb Mixx)	Central Station	LNGA-004	2×CD, Album	Australia
2008	Schiller - Sehnsucht	Destiny	Universal Music Domestic Division	06025 1757837 1	2×CD, Album, DVD, DVD-Video, PAL	Germany
2008	Schiller - Desire	Destiny	Island Records	06025 1772012 1	CD, Album	Germany
2010	Schiller - Breathless	Sunday	Island Records	06025 2740708 1	CD, Album	Europe

=== Singles & EPs ===
Year	Album	Song	Label	Catalog#	Format	Country
	Faithless - The Remixes Vol. 1	Faithless Vs. Despina Vandi - Mawahh	Not On Label (Faithless)	FAITH 01	Vinyl, 12", Unofficial Release	UK
2004	Various – Positiva 11 - One Louder	Gia (DJ Gregory Remix)	Positiva	CDMIAMI2004	CD, Maxi-Single	UK
2005	Various – Armand Van Helden Remixes Vol 2	Opa Opa (Armand Van Helden Remix)	Not On Label (NT Series)	NT115	Vinyl, 12", Unofficial Release, White Label	

=== Compilations ===
Year	Album	Song	Label	Catalog#	Format	Country
2002	Said Mrad - Guru Ayia Napa - Gift Of Love 1	Gia (Said Mrad Remix)	Mukta Music	00113	CD, Compilation	Cyprus
2003	Various – Clubsolutely 7	Gia (Milk & Sugar Remix)	Phonokol	2284-2	2×CD, Compilation	Israel
2003	Various – Sólid Sounds Anno 2003 Volume 03	Gia (DJ Gregory Remix)	541, Play It Again Sam [PIAS]	541416 501074, N01.1074.023	2×CD, Compilation	Belgium
2003	Various – Now Dance 2004	Gia	Virgin	VTDCD 539	2×CD, Compilation	UK
2003	Various – Club Sounds Vol. 28	Gia (Radio Edit)	Sony Music Media	SMM 514783 2	2×CD, Compilation	Germany
2003	Various – Hot Parade	Gia	TIME	TIME 375 CDDP	2×CD, Compilation, Partially Mixed	Italy
2003	Various – Best Of Tribal Vol. 1	Gia (DJ Gregory Remix)	Robbins Entertainment	76869-75042-2	CD, Compilation	USA
2003	Various – Hit Mania Dance Estate 2003	Gia	Hit Mania	013/2	CD, Compilation, Partially Mixed	Italy
2003	Harem III - The Best Of Harem	Despina Vandi featuring Harem - Gia	Heaven Music	5204958 8021 2 8	CD, Compilation	Greece
2004	Various – Blanco Y Negro Hits	Opa Opa	Blanco Y Negro	MXCD 1462 (SR)	CD, Compilation	Spain
2004	Various – Club Sounds Vol. 32	Opa Opa (Milk & Sugar Radio Mix)	Sony Music Media	519413 2	2×CD, Compilation	Germany
2004	Various – Firstclass - The Finest In House - Best Of 2004 / 2005	Opa Opa (Milk & Sugar Radio Mix)	Polystar Records	982 654-5, 0 06024 9826547 5	2×CD, Compilation	Germany
2004	Tony Monaco - Italo Euro Hits 2	Opa Opa (Bass Bumpers Video Mix)	SPG Music Productions Ltd.	SPG-5067	CD, Compilation, Partially Mixed	Canada
2004	Various – Clubber's Guide To Ibiza 2004 (4 Track Teaser EP)	Opa Opa (Armand Van Helden Dub Mix)	Ministry Of Sound (Germany)	100602 1FK	Vinyl, 12", Compilation	Germany
2004	Various – Pioneer The Album Vol. 5	Opa Opa (Chippe Remix)	Blanco Y Negro	MXCD-1502 (CD) CTV	3×CD, Compilation	Spain
2004	Various – Nu Dance Traxx Volume 93	Opa Opa (Bass Bumpers Club Mix)	ERG Music	NDT001093	CD, Compilation, Promo	Canada
2004	Various – Multi Mega Mix 1.1	Gia (Dj Gregory Remix)	Blanco Y Negro	MXCD-1442 (PM)	CD, Compilation	Spain
2004	Various – Bolero Mix 21	Opa Opa	Blanco Y Negro	MXCD-1513 (CB)	2×CD, Compilation	Spain
2004	Various – Bolero Mix 21	Opa Opa	Blanco Y Negro	MXCD-1513 (CB)	2×CD, Compilation	Spain
2004	Various – Ultra.eDance 01	Gia (DJ Gregory Remix)	Ultra Records	UL 1210	11 x File, MP3, Compilation	USA
2004	Various – DJ Masters Unmixed #2	Opa Opa (Armand Van Helden Club Mix)	Central Station	CSRCD5231	3×CD, Compilation	Australia
2004	Various – Pokito Hits	Opa Opa (Bass Bumpers Video Edit)	Media Spirit	0000032MSP	CD, Compilation	Germany
2004	Various – Planeta DJ 2004	Opa Opa (Original Mix)	Building Records	BUI 0184	2×CD, Compilation	Brazil
2004	Various – Mas Nescafé Año Uno	Opa Opa [DVD]	Mucha Mas Música	7647329	CD, Compilation, DVD, NTSC, DS (Dual Sided)	Mexico
2004	Various – Destijl Hits	Opa Opa (English Version) (Bass Bumpers Club Mix)	Heaven Music	5204958 8038 2	CD, Compilation	Greece
2004	Various – Summer Zone 2004	Gia	Edel Records	0156322ERE	CD, Compilation	Germany
2004	Various – Супер Сборник Зарубежный	Despina Vandi feat. Phoebus - Come Along Now	Сфера Рекордс	CD CR 583-04	CD, Compilation	Russia
2004	Various – The Best From The West - Лето 2004	Opa Opa	GM Studio		CD, Compilation	Russia
2004	Various – Hot Tracks 23-5 - Mainstream Dance	Opa Opa 2004	Hot Tracks		CD, Compilation, Promo	USA
2004	Various – Just The Best Vol. 49	Opa Opa (Bass Bumpers Video Edit)	Sony Music Media, Ariola, EMM (EMI Music Media)	7243 8 66501 2 2, 7243 8 66501 2 2, 7243 8 66501 2 2	2×CD, Compilation, Copy Protected	Germany
2005	Various – Ultimate Dance Remixed	Opa Opa (Bass Bumpers Club Mix)	Water Music Dance	302 060 537 2	2×CD, Compilation	USA
2005	Various – Wild Summer 2005	Opa Opa (Bass Bumpers Video Mix)	Central Station	CSR CD 5224	2×CD, Compilation	Australia
2005	Various – Pioneer The Album Vol. 6	Come Along Now (XTM Airplay Remix)	Blanco Y Negro	MXCD-1591 CD (CTV)	3×CD, Compilation	Spain
2006	Various – House Number Ones	Opa Opa (Bass Bumpers Club Mix - Edit)	Sony BMG Music Entertainment (Germany)	82876 84726 2	2×CD, Compilation	Germany
2006	Various – 1000 И 1 Ночь. Part 3	Despina Vandi feat. Giorgos Mazonakis - Amane	Одиссей, Планета Хитов	od 10.06.952, 123.376-2	CD, Compilation	Ukraine
2006	Various – Pasion Por El Dance	Opa Opa [CD]	Blanco Y Negro	MXCD 1625 (CS) CTV	CD, Compilation, DVD, Compilation, DVD-Video, PAL	Spain
2006	Various – Pasion Por El Dance	Opa Opa [DVD]	Blanco Y Negro	MXCD 1625 (CS) CTV	CD, Compilation, DVD, Compilation, DVD-Video, PAL	Spain
2006	Various – Ultra Jackpot	Jambi (Original Mix) (Bonus Track)	Ultra Records	BLT 160-2P	3×CD, Compilation, Promo	USA
2011	Various – The Spicy Collection	Erota Theli I Zoi	The Spicy Effect	24004	CD, Compilation	Greece
2011	Various – The Spicy Collection	Gi' Alli Mia Fora	The Spicy Effect	24004	CD, Compilation	Greece
2012	Various – Minos 2000-2005	Spania	Minos-EMI (Greece)	Χ.Μ-ΑΑΚΣΧ20090600037	4×CD, Compilation	Greece
2012	Various – Minos 2000-2005	Lipame	Minos-EMI (Greece)	Χ.Μ-ΑΑΚΣΧ20090600037	4×CD, Compilation	Greece
2012	Various – Minos 2000-2005	Ipofero	Minos-EMI (Greece)	Χ.Μ-ΑΑΚΣΧ20090600037	4×CD, Compilation	Greece
2012	Various – Minos 2000-2005	Katalliles Proipothesis (feat. Giorgos Lempesis)	Minos-EMI (Greece)	Χ.Μ-ΑΑΚΣΧ20090600037	4×CD, Compilation	Greece
2012	Various – Minos 2000-2005	Deka Entoles	Minos-EMI (Greece)	Χ.Μ-ΑΑΚΣΧ20090600037	4×CD, Compilation	Greece
2012	Various – Spicy Summer 2012	Girismata	The Spicy Effect		2×CD, Compilation	Greece
2012	Various – Spicy Summer 2012	Mou 'His Perasi	The Spicy Effect		2×CD, Compilation	Greece
2012	Various – Minos Summer 2012	Mou 'His Perasi	Minos-EMI (Greece)		2×CD, Compilation	Greece
2012	Phoebus - 20 Chronia Phoebus - 20 Chronia Epitihies	Stin Avli Tou Paradisou	The Spicy Effect		6×CD, Compilation	Greece
2012	Phoebus - 20 Chronia Phoebus - 20 Chronia Epitihies	To Koritsaki Sou	The Spicy Effect		6×CD, Compilation	Greece
2012	Phoebus - 20 Chronia Phoebus - 20 Chronia Epitihies	Girismata	The Spicy Effect		6×CD, Compilation	Greece
2012	Phoebus - 20 Chronia Phoebus - 20 Chronia Epitihies	Lipame	The Spicy Effect		6×CD, Compilation	Greece
2012	Phoebus - 20 Chronia Phoebus - 20 Chronia Epitihies	Ela	The Spicy Effect		6×CD, Compilation	Greece
2012	Phoebus - 20 Chronia Phoebus - 20 Chronia Epitihies	Giatriko	The Spicy Effect		6×CD, Compilation	Greece
2012	Phoebus - 20 Chronia Phoebus - 20 Chronia Epitihies	Erota Theli I Zoi	The Spicy Effect		6×CD, Compilation	Greece
2012	Phoebus - 20 Chronia Phoebus - 20 Chronia Epitihies	Thelo Na Se Ksehaso	The Spicy Effect		6×CD, Compilation	Greece
2012	Phoebus - 20 Chronia Phoebus - 20 Chronia Epitihies	Na Ti Herese	The Spicy Effect		6×CD, Compilation	Greece
2012	Phoebus - 20 Chronia Phoebus - 20 Chronia Epitihies	Giorgos Lempesis feat. Despina Vandi - Katalliles Proipothesis	The Spicy Effect		6×CD, Compilation	Greece
2012	Phoebus - 20 Chronia Phoebus - 20 Chronia Epitihies	To Nisi	The Spicy Effect		6×CD, Compilation	Greece
2012	Phoebus - 20 Chronia Phoebus - 20 Chronia Epitihies	Oute Ena Efharisto	The Spicy Effect		6×CD, Compilation	Greece
2012	Phoebus - 20 Chronia Phoebus - 20 Chronia Epitihies	Sta 'Dosa Ola	The Spicy Effect		6×CD, Compilation	Greece
2012	Phoebus - 20 Chronia Phoebus - 20 Chronia Epitihies	O Perittos	The Spicy Effect		6×CD, Compilation	Greece
2012	Phoebus - 20 Chronia Phoebus - 20 Chronia Epitihies	Apapa	The Spicy Effect		6×CD, Compilation	Greece
2012	Phoebus - 20 Chronia Phoebus - 20 Chronia Epitihies	Oti Onirevomoun	The Spicy Effect		6×CD, Compilation	Greece
2012	Phoebus - 20 Chronia Phoebus - 20 Chronia Epitihies	Nihtolouloudo Mou	The Spicy Effect		6×CD, Compilation	Greece
2012	Phoebus - 20 Chronia Phoebus - 20 Chronia Epitihies	Iparhi Zoi	The Spicy Effect		6×CD, Compilation	Greece
2012	Phoebus - 20 Chronia Phoebus - 20 Chronia Epitihies	Ipofero	The Spicy Effect		6×CD, Compilation	Greece
2012	Phoebus - 20 Chronia Phoebus - 20 Chronia Epitihies	Gia	The Spicy Effect		6×CD, Compilation	Greece
2012	Phoebus - 20 Chronia Phoebus - 20 Chronia Epitihies	I Gi Ke I Selini	The Spicy Effect		6×CD, Compilation	Greece
2012	Phoebus - 20 Chronia Phoebus - 20 Chronia Epitihies	Come Along Now	The Spicy Effect		6×CD, Compilation	Greece
2012	Phoebus - 20 Chronia Phoebus - 20 Chronia Epitihies	Kommati Ap' Tin Kardia Sou	The Spicy Effect		6×CD, Compilation	Greece
2012	Phoebus - 20 Chronia Phoebus - 20 Chronia Epitihies	Christougenna (Bonus Track)	The Spicy Effect		6×CD, Compilation	Greece
2013	Various – Minos 2014	Girismata	Minos-EMI (Greece)		2×CD, Compilation	Greece
2015	Various – Hits 2015	Kalimera (Remix)	Heaven Music		CD, Compilation	Greece

=== Mixes ===
Year	Album	Song	Label	Catalog#	Format	Country
2003	Various – Olá® - Love 2 Dance - Mixed by Big Louie G	Gia (DJ Gregory Vocal Mix) [CD]	Enter Records	11.80.8221	CD, Mixed, DVD, Mixed	Portugal
2003	Various – Nova Era DJ 5	Gia (DJ Gregory Remix)	Kaos Records, Vidisco	KCD200369, 11.80.8235	2×CD, Compilation, Mixed	Portugal
2003	Various – ID&T Yearmix 2003	Gia (DJ Gregory Remix)	Universal TV	981 419-4	CD, Mixed, Compilation	Netherlands
2003	Sir Colin - OXA Ibiza Party 2003	Gia (DJ Gregory Main Remix)	OXA	TBA OXA 9407-2	CD, Compilation, Mixed	Switzerland
2003	Various – Kontor - Top Of The Clubs Volume 20	Gia (Milk & Sugar Remix)	Kontor Records	0150322KON	2×CD, Mixed, Compilation	Germany
2003	Various – Deejay Parade Estate 2003	Gia	TIME	TIME 370 CDDP	2×CD, Mixed, Compilation	Italy
2003	Various – The Annual 2004 - German Edition	Gia (Greek-English Version)	Polystar Records	981 523-9	2×CD, Compilation, Mixed	Germany
2003	Bob Sinclar / Martin Solveig - Africanism Vol. II	Despina Vandy - Gia (DJ Gregory Remix)	Yellow Productions	AFRICA 02 CD	2×CD, Mixed, Compilation	France
2003	Various – The Spirit Of Space - Ibiza	Gia (DJ Gregory Mix)	Ministry Of Sound (Germany)	938 476-2	CD, Compilation, Mixed	Germany
2003	Various – Ministry Of Sound: The Annual 2004	Gia (DJ Gregory Remix)	Ultra Records	UL 1181-2	2×CD, Mixed, Compilation	USA
2003	Various – Mixmania 2003 Level Four	Gia	Antler-Subway, EMI Music (Belgium)	AS 9085, 07243 596400 2 0	CD, Mixed, Compilation	Belgium
2003	Various – Wild Summer 2004	Gia (Radio Edit)	Central Station	CSR CD 5193	2×CD, Compilation, Mixed	Australia
2003	Various – Wild Summer 2004	Gia	Central Station	CSR CD 5193	2×CD, Compilation, Mixed	Australia
2003	Tony Monaco - Euro Invasion III	Gia	SPG Music Productions Ltd.	SPG-1025	CD, Compilation, Mixed	Canada
2003	Sharam Jey vs. Chrissi D! - Battle Of The DJs	Gia (DJ Gregory Remix)	Silly Spider Music	SSMBOD/01	2×CD, Compilation, Mixed, Digipak	Germany
2003	Various – Odissea Fun City Compilation Vol. 1	Già	4Tune Records	4TUNE CD158	CD, Compilation, Mixed	Italy
2003	Various – The Annual 2004	Gia (Radio Edit Mix)	2 Dance	5606086000221	3×CD, Mixed, Compilation	Portugal
2003	Various – The Annual 2004	Gia (Level K Remix)	2 Dance	5606086000221	3×CD, Mixed, Compilation	Portugal
2003	Pete Tong - Essential Selection	Gia (DJ Gregory Mix)	Matrix Musik, Trust The DJ	CDTRIX113, TTDJCS 049	CD, Mixed	Slovenia
2003	Pete Tong - Essential Selection Summer '03	Gia (DJ Gregory Mix)	Moonshine Music	MM 80212-2	CD, Mixed	USA
2003	David Visan - Buddha-Bar V	Gia	George V Records, Wagram	3082472, 3082472	2×CD, Compilation, Mixed	France
2003	David Visan - Buddha-Bar V	Gia	George V Records	4 GVR2 71034-2.2 01	2×CD, Mixed, Compilation	USA
2004	Pete Tong - Tong's Future Classics	Gia (Minimal Chic Mix)	Mixmag	MIXMAG 02/04	CD, Mixed, Compilation	UK
2004	Ben Liebrand - Grandmix 2003	Gia	Sony Music Media	SMM 515260 2	3×CD, Compilation, Mixed	Netherlands
2004	Various – Club Hits 2004	Gia (DJ Gregory Remix)	SPG Music Productions Ltd.	SPG-2603	2×CD, Mixed	Canada
2004	Nick Skitz - Skitzmix 17	Gia (Skitz Airplay Mixx)	Central Station	CSR CD 5196	CD, Mixed	Australia
2004	Nick Skitz - Skitzmix 18	Gia [DVD]	Central Station	CSR CD 5207	CD, Mixed	Australia
2004	EDX & Leon Klein - Blue Night - The Girls Party	Opa Opa (Milk & Sugar Vocal Club Mix)	OXA	TBA OXA 9443-2	CD, Compilation, Mixed	Switzerland
2004	Various – Ministry Of Sound: The Annual 2005	Come Along Now Vs. Gia	Ultra Records	UL 1240-2	2×CD, Mixed, Compilation	USA
2004	Various – Club Anthems - Volume 1	Opa Opa (Bass Bumpers Club Mix)	Ultra Records	UL 1235-2	CD, Mixed	USA
2004	Jason Nevins - Push It Harder - The Lost Tapes	Gia (DJ Gregory Remix)	Central Station	CSR CD 5194	CD, Compilation, Mixed	Australia
2004	MC Mario - Mixdown 2004	Gia (Original Mix)	Sony Music Entertainment (Canada)	TVK 24163	CD, Compilation, Mixed	Canada
2004	Various – Mixmania 2004/03	Opa Opa	EMI Music (Belgium)	7243 8 74750 2 1	CD, Mixed	Belgium
2004	Various – Milk&Sugar Recordings Summer Sessions 2004	Gia (Milk & Sugar Club Mix)	Milk & Sugar Recordings	MSRCD04	CD, Compilation, Mixed, Copy Protected	Germany
2004	Daniel Desnoyers - Le Beat Vol. 6	Gia	DKD D-Noy Muzik	DDN2-1919	CD, Compilation, Mixed	Canada
2004	Various – Club Hits Vol.10	Opa Opa	New Yorker Music & Media	NY-CLUB-010	CD, Compilation, Mixed	Germany
2004	MC Mario - Party Mix 2004	Opa Opa	Sony Music Entertainment (Canada)	TVK 24197	CD, Compilation, Mixed	Canada
2004	MC Mario - Trance Divas	Gia (DJ Gregory Remix)	Sony Music Entertainment (Canada)	TVK 24158	CD, Compilation, Mixed	Canada
2004	DJ Brett Henrichsen - Masterbeat Gay Days Orlando 2004	Gia (DJ Gregory Remix)	Master Entertainment		CD, Compilation, Mixed	USA
2004	Arian 911 - Clubber’s Guide To Ibiza 2004	Opa Opa (Armand Van Helden Dub Mix)	Ministry Of Sound (Germany)	0010062MIN	2×CD, Mixed, Compilation	Germany
2005	Various – Club Hits 2006	Come Along Now vs. Gia (Extended Edit)	SPG Music Productions Ltd.	SPG-2606	2×CD, Mixed	Canada
2005	Various – House Mix Volume 2	Opa Opa (Armand Van Helden Club Mix)	SPG Music Productions Ltd.	SPG-4050	2×CD, Mixed	Canada
2005	Various – Activate 14	Opa Opa (Milk & Sugar Vocal Club Mix)	Rhythm Express Music	ACT 14CD	CD, Mixed	Australia
2005	Various – The Annual 2005	Opa Opa (Chippe Mix) [CD]	2 Dance	5606086000337	CD, Mixed, DVD	Portugal
2005	Various – The Annual 2005	Gia [DVD]	2 Dance	5606086000337	CD, Mixed, DVD	Portugal
2006	Nick Skitz - Skitzmix 24	Opa Opa [DVD]	Central Station	CSR CD 5375	CD, Mixed, Compilation, DVD, Compilation	Australia
2007	Various – Ultra.10	Gia	Ultra Records	UL 1553-2	2×CD, Compilation, Mixed	USA
2007	Nick Skitz - Skitzmix 27	Come Along Now [DVD]	Central Station	CSR CD 5464	CD, Compilation, Mixed, DVD, DVD-Video	Australia
2008	D.J. S.E.A.L.K. - In The M.I.X.	Schiller mit Despina Vandi - Destiny (Destiny Mix)	The Metrosexual Intraurban Xenophilist	MIX01	3×CDr, Mixed, Compilation, Promo	Europe
2008	Nikos Halkousis - Non Stop Mix 4	Tha 'thela	Heaven Music	5204958 0153 2 0	CD, Compilation, Mixed	Greece
2008	Nikos Halkousis - Non Stop Mix 4	To Proto Mas Fili	Heaven Music	5204958 0153 2 0	CD, Compilation, Mixed	Greece
2008	Nikos Halkousis - Non Stop Mix 4	Se Hriazome	Heaven Music	5204958 0153 2 0	CD, Compilation, Mixed	Greece
2008	Nikos Halkousis - Non Stop Mix 4	Agapi	Heaven Music	5204958 0153 2 0	CD, Compilation, Mixed	Greece
2008	Nikos Halkousis - Non Stop Mix 4	I Gi Ki I Selini	Heaven Music	5204958 0153 2 0	CD, Compilation, Mixed	Greece
2008	Nikos Halkousis - Non Stop Mix 4	Ta Lefta (Remix)	Heaven Music	5204958 0153 2 0	CD, Compilation, Mixed	Greece

=== Videos ===
Year	Album	Song	Label	Catalog#	Format	Country
2004	Various – Promo Only Dance Mix Video - May 2004	Gia (DJ Gregory Remix Edit)	Promo Only	DMV0504	DVD, DVD-Video, Promo	USA
2004	Various – Promo Only Club Video: September 4	Opa Opa	Promo Only	CV0904	DVD, Compilation	USA
2004	Various – Promo Only Club Video: October 4	Opa Opa (Bass Bumpers Club Edit)	Promo Only	CV1008	DVD, Compilation	USA

== Footnotes ==
- A. C'est La Vie was released as a covermount with the nationwide newspaper Real News that sold 103,200 copies that day. However IFPI Greece does not award certifications for albums released with newspapers unless each copy of the album has been paid for, thus this indicates that the album has not sold enough official retail copies to receive a certification.
