= The Video Collection: '97–'03 =

Video by Despina Vandi
- Released: December 18, 2003
- Recorded: 1997–2003
- Genre: Music videos (contemporary laïka, dance-pop)
- Label: Heaven Music
- Producer: Phoebus, Kostas Kapetanidis, Anosi S.A.

Despina Vandi chronology
The Video Collection: '97–'03 (2003)	Hits on DVD: Despina Vandi (1994-2000) (2004)

The Video Collection: '97–'03 is the first video album by Greek singer Despina Vandi, released in 2003 by Heaven Music in Greece and Cyprus. It features videos from the beginning of Vandi's collaboration with songwriter Phoebus since 1997. All of the music videos were directed by Kostas Kapetanidis.

== Track listing ==
1. "Gia"
2. "Thelo Na Se Do"
3. "Olo Lipeis"
4. "Anaveis Foties/Deste Mou Ta Matia"
5. "Lathos Anthropos"
6. "Ela"
7. "I Melodia tis Monaxias"
8. "Simera"
9. "Ipofero"
10. "To Koritsaki Sou"
11. "Nihtolouloudo Mou"
12. "S'ta 'Dosa Ola"
13. "Lipame"
14. "Christougenna"
15. "Gia" (UK Version)

== Charts ==
Chart	Provider	Peak position	Certification	Sales
Greek DVD Chart	IFPI	1	Gold	6,000
Cypriot Album Chart	All Records Top 20	1	Gold	
