= 10 Hronia Mazi =

10 H.M.

Studio album by Despina Vandi
- Released: December 5, 2007
- Recorded: 2007
- Genre: Laïka, contemporary laïka, pop rock, dance-pop
- Length: 2:10:32
- Language: Greek, English
- Label: Heaven Music
- Producer: Phoebus

Despina Vandi chronology
The EMI Years: The Complete Collection (2007)	10 H.M. (2007)	C'est La Vie (2010)

Singles from 10 Hronia Mazi
- 1. "Thelo" Released: October 10, 2007; 2. "10 Hronia Mazi" Released: November 15, 2007; 3. "Agapi" Released: March 6, 2008; 4. "Fantasou Apla" Released: April 24, 2008; 5. "I Gi Ki I Selini" Released: June 17, 2008; 6. "Destiny (Schiller mit Despina Vandi)" Released: June 17, 2008; 7. "Tha' Thela" Released: September 18, 2008

10 H.M. (Short for 10 Hronia Mazi, Greek: 10 Χρόνια Μαζί; English: 10 Years Together) is an album released by Greek singer Despina Vandi starting on December 6, 2007. It is her 12th album from the beginning of her career, and her 10th album with Phoebus. It is also her first studio album of new material since her 2004 release of Stin Avli Tou Paradisou. The album is dedicated to the 10-year collaboration with Phoebus and features a track of the same name. The album is a triple CD, with the first CD containing pop/rock songs, the second CD containing Modern Laika songs and third CD containing new remixes of older songs. The album is completely written and produced by Phoebus and released by Heaven Music. The main sponsor is WIND Hellas. The album went platinum status (47.000) in Greece and platinum (10.000) in Cyprus.

On June 24, 2008, the album was repackaged with the title 10 Hronia Mazi: It's Destiny as one disc. The repackaged version includes the song "Destiny" by Schiller featuring Despina Vandi that was composed by Phoebus. The one-disc repackage version features all the songs from the original first and second discs, excluding all the remixes (with the exception of "Ta Lefta" (Remix)) and disc three.

== Track listing ==
Disc One: Original edition
No.	Title	Lyrics	Music	Length
1.	"Thelo" (Θέλω; I want)	Phoebus	Phoebus	5:26
2.	"Agapi" (Αγάπη; Love)	Phoebus	Phoebus	3:26
3.	"Otan Lipis" (Όταν λείπεις; When you're gone)	Phoebus	Phoebus	4:19
4.	"Kathe Mera" (Κάθε μέρα; Every day)		Phoebus	4:40
5.	"Se Hriazome" (Σε χρειάζομαι; I need you)	Phoebus	Phoebus	4:06
6.	"I Gi Ki I Selini" (Η γη κι η σελήνη; The earth and the moon)	Phoebus	Phoebus	3:51
7.	"Girismos" (Γυρισμός; The return)	Phoebus	Phoebus	5:18
8.	"I Maska (Remix)" (Η μάσκα (Remix); The mask (Remix))	Phoebus	Phoebus	4:17
9.	"Thelo (Club Mix)" (Θέλω (Club Mix); I want (Remix))	Phoebus	Phoebus	3:57
10.	"10 Hronia Mazi" (10 χρόνια μαζί; 10 years together)	Phoebus	Phoebus	3:57
Total length:				43:14

Disc Two: Original edition
No.	Title	Lyrics	Music	Length
1.	"Tha 'Thela" (Θα 'θελα; I would like)	Phoebus	Phoebus	4:09
2.	"To Thavma" (Το θαύμα; The miracle)	Phoebus	Phoebus	4:26
3.	"Provlepsimos" (Προβλέψιμος; Predictable)	Phoebus	Phoebus	3:36
4.	"Kathe Tris Ke Ligo" (Κάθε τρεις και λίγο; Every now and then)	Phoebus	Phoebus	4:58
5.	"Fantasou Apla" (Φαντάσου απλά; Just imagine)	Phoebus	Phoebus	3:58
6.	"Tihi" (Τύχη; Luck)	Phoebus	Phoebus	3:38
7.	"Sindromo Sterisis" (Σύνδρομο στέρησης; Deprivation syndrome)	Phoebus	Phoebus	3:30
8.	"Ta Lefta (Remix)" (Τα λεφτά (Remix); Money (Remix))	Phoebus	Phoebus	3:59
9.	"Sindromo Sterisis (Remix)" (Σύνδρομο στέρησης (Remix); Deprival syndrome (Remix))	Phoebus	Phoebus	3:57
10.	"To Thavma (Remix)" (Το θαύμα (Remix); The miracle (Remix))	Phoebus	Phoebus	5:54
Total length:				42:01

Disc Three: Original edition
No.	Title	Lyrics	Music	Length
1.	"Gia (Gia – English Version)" (Γεια (Gia – English Version))	Phoebus	Phoebus	3:03
2.	"Fevgoume Kardia Mou (DJ NV Remix – TND & Ice Mix)" (Φεύγουμε καρδιά μου (DJ NV Remix – TND & Ice Mix); We're leaving my heart (DJ NV Remix – TND & Ice Mix))	Phoebus	Phoebus	3:50
3.	"An De M' Agapas (DJ NV NRG Mix)" (Αν δε μ' αγαπάς (DJ NV NRG Mix); If you don't love me (DJ NV NRG Mix))	Phoebus	Phoebus	4:32
4.	"Come Along Now (Remix by D.J. Luke)"	Phoebus	Phoebus	5:07
5.	"Thimisou (Soumka Mix)" (Θυμήσου (Soumka Mix); Remember (Soumka Mix))	Vaggelis Konstantinidis, Phoebus	Phoebus	6:22
6.	"Kanto An M' Agapas (Anthony VL Chill Mix) (feat. Thanos Petrelis)" (Κάντο αν μ' αγαπάς (Anthony VL Chill Mix); Do it if you love me (Anthony VL Chill Mix))	Natalia Germanou	Phoebus	5:04
7.	"I Melodia Tis Monaksias (Soumka Loneliness Mix)" (Η μελωδία της μοναξιάς (Soumka Loneliness Mix); The melody of loneliness (Soumka Loneliness Mix))	Phoebus	Phoebus	5:57
8.	"Anavis Foties (Dance Mix)" (Ανάβεις φωτιές (Dance Mix); Fire starter (Dance Mix))	Phoebus	Phoebus	4:04
9.	"Jambi (Club Mix)"	Phoebus	Phoebus	3:46
10.	"C'est La Vie (Simera)" (C'est La Vie (Σήμερα); That's life (Today))	Phoebus	Phoebus	3:35
Total length:				45:17

Bonus track: WIND Plus
No.	Title	Lyrics	Music	Length
1.	"Ela (Remix By Dj Nv And Paris K)" (Έλα (Remix By Dj Nv And Paris K); Come to me (Remix By Dj Nv And Paris K))	Natalia Germanou	Phoebus	4:00

10 Hronia Mazi: It's Destiny
No.	Title	Lyrics	Music	Length
1.	"Thelo" (Θέλω; I want)	Phoebus	Phoebus	5:26
2.	"Agapi" (Αγάπη; Love)	Phoebus	Phoebus	3:26
3.	"Otan Lipis" (Όταν λείπεις; When you're gone)	Phoebus	Phoebus	4:19
4.	"Kathe Mera" (Κάθε μέρα; Every day)	Phoebus	Phoebus	4:40
5.	"Se Hriazome" (Σε χρειάζομαι; I need you)	Phoebus	Phoebus	4:06
6.	"I Gi Ki I Selini" (Η γη κι η σελήνη; The earth and the moon)	Phoebus	Phoebus	3:51
7.	"Girismos" (Γυρισμός; The return)	Phoebus	Phoebus	5:18
8.	"10 Hronia Mazi" (10 χρόνια μαζί; 10 years together)	Phoebus	Phoebus	3:59
9.	"Tha 'Thela" (Θα 'θελα; I would like)	Phoebus	Phoebus	4:09
10.	"To Thavma" (Το θαύμα; The miracle)	Phoebus	Phoebus	4:26
11.	"Provlepsimos" (Προβλέψιμος; Predictable)	Phoebus	Phoebus	3:36
12.	"Kathe Tris Ke Ligo" (Κάθε τρεις και λίγο; Every now and then)	Phoebus	Phoebus	4:58
13.	"Fantasou Apla" (Φαντάσου απλά; Just imagine)	Phoebus	Phoebus	3:58
14.	"Tihi" (Τύχη; Luck)	Phoebus	Phoebus	3:38
15.	"Sindromo Sterisis" (Σύνδρομο στέρησης; Deprival syndrome)	Phoebus	Phoebus	3:30
16.	"Ta Lefta (Remix)" (Τα λεφτά (Remix); Money (Remix))	Phoebus	Phoebus	3:59
17.	"Destiny (Schiller mit Despina Vandi)"	Christopher von Deylen, Phoebus	Christopher von Deylen, Phoebus	4:13
Total length:				1:11:27

== Singles and music videos ==
The following singles were officially released to radio stations and made into Music Videos. Additional songs such as, "Girismos", "Se Hreiazomai", "Sindromo Sterisis" and "Kathe Mera", despite not having been released as singles, managed to gain radio airplay.

"Thelo"

"Thelo" was released on 10/10 at 10 AM to all radio stations simultaneously to celebrate the 10 years of collaboration. The song was Number 1 on the Nielsen Greece Top 20 Chart for 5 straight weeks.

"10 Hronia Mazi"

"10 Hronia Mazi" is the second single of the album which released on radio stations all over the Greece on November 16, 2007. It is about Vandi's ten year collaboration with Phoebus. The music video premiered December 7 on MAD TV.

"Agapi"

"Agapi" is the third single of the album. The music video premiered on MAD TV on March 6, 2008. It reached number 5 on the Greek radio airplay chart.

"Fantasou Apla"

"Fantasou Apla" is the fourth single and was released on April 24, 2008 on MAD TV in the form of a music video. was filmed at the same time as "Agapi".

"I Gi Ki I Selini"

"I Gi Ki I Selini" is the fifth single and was released on June 17, 2008. Her performance at the "MAD Video Music Awards 2008" was used as the music video of the single.

"Destiny"

"Destiny" is a song by Schiller, with vocals by Despina Vandi. The song was released as radio-single and was included on Vandi's repackaged CD "10 Hronia Mazi: It's Destiny". She also performed the song with Schiller on June 17, 2008 on the stage of the "MAD Video Music Awards 2008".

"Tha' Thela"

"Tha' Thela" is the seventh single and was released on September 18, 2008 on MAD TV. The music video features the live performance of the song at Love Radio party which took place on May 12, 2008.

== Release history ==
Region	Date	Label	Format	Version
Greece	December 5, 2007	Heaven Music	CD, digital download	Original release
Cyprus	December 5, 2007	Heaven Music	CD, digital download	Original release
Greece	June 24, 2008	Heaven Music	CD, digital download	It's Destiny Re-release
Cyprus	June 24, 2008	Heaven Music	CD, digital download	It's Destiny Re-release

== Charts ==
The album went platinum, selling 30,000 copies, in its first week and made its debut at number 4 on the Greek Albums Chart beaten by Mihalis Hatzigiannis, Peggy Zina and Notis Sfakianakis. The album placed ninth on the IFPI annual albums chart for 2007. The album re-entered the chart for one week at number 39 on 22nd week of 2008 before leaving the chart once again. The album returned on charts after the repackaging at number 10 and then spent two weeks at number 15. Almost 4 years after its release, on the 20th week of 2011, the album re-entered at number 3 and on the 21st week it falls at 4.

Chart	Providers	Peak position	Weeks on charts	Certification
Greek Albums Chart	IFPI	3	17	Platinum
Cypriot Album Chart	All Records Top 20	4	20	Platinum

== Credits and personnel ==
Personnel

- Antonis Andreou – trombone
- Romeos Avlastimidis – violin
- Achilleas Diamantis – guitars (electrics, acoustics, twelve-strings)
- Akis Diximos – second vocals, background vocals
- Spiros Dorizas – drums
- Nektarios Georgiadis – background vocals
- Pantelis Gkertsos – guitars (electrics)
- Takis Haramis – bass
- Giorgos Hatzopoulos – guitars (acoustics, twelve-strings, electrics)
- Panos Hronopoulos – remix
- Telis Kafkas – bass
- Trifon Koutsourelis – orchestration, programming, keyboards, remix
- Giannis Lionakis – orchestration, programming, guitars (acoustics, electrics), tzoura, baglama, keyboards, remix
- DJ Luke – remix
- Giannis Mpithikotsis – bouzouki, baglama, tzoura
- Christos Mpousdoukos – violin
- Vasilis Nikolopoulos – drums, remix, snare drum
- Phoebus – music, lyrics, orchestration, programming, keyboards, pneumatic, remix
- Giorgos Roilos – percussion
- Soumka – remix
- Manos Theodosakis – trumpet
- Despina Vandi – vocals
- Thanasis Vasilopoulos – clarinet, ney
- Antonis Vlahos – orchestration, mix
- Nikos Voutouras – orchestration, mix
- Nikos Zervas – keyboards

Production

- Thodoris Hrisanthopoulos – mastering
- Trifon Koutsourelis – sound
- Vasilis Nikolopoulos – sound, mix
- Phoebus – production manager, mix
- Vaggelis Siapatis – sound, computer editing
- Giorgos Stampolis – production

Design

- Dimitris Dimitroulis – make up
- Christos Karatzolas – photo cover
- Alexandra Katsaiti – styling
- P. Koutsikos – art direction
- Stefanos Vasilakis – hair styling
- A. Vasmoulakis – art direction

Credits adapted from the album's liner notes.

== See also ==
- Despina Vandi discography
