= MAD Secret Concerts: Despina Vandi Live =

2006 live album by Despina Vandi

Video by Despina Vandi
- Released: July 2006
- Recorded: March 2006
- Genre: Disco, dance-pop, R&B, funk
- Label: Heaven Music
- Director: Kostas Kapetanidis, Anosi S.A.
- Producer: Kostas Kalimeris

Despina Vandi chronology
Despina Vandi Karaoke Vol.1 (2004)	MAD Secret Concerts: Despina Vandi Live (2007)	Greek Hits: Giorgos Mazonakis vs. Despina Vandi (2008)

MAD Secret Concerts: Despina Vandi Live is the fourth video album by Greek singer Despina Vandi, released in 2006 by Heaven Music in Greece and Cyprus.

== Background ==
The video is made up entirely of English-language material with Vandi performing covers of international music artists. The video centers mostly around retro themes, with songs mostly from the 1980s, and focuses on disco and dance genres, including some R&B, funk, and hip hop sounds. Other songs that were performed but were not included on the track listing were "Fame" by Irene Cara and "Is It a Crime" by Sade. The repertoire that Vandi had chosen were song that she described as a "life dream" of hers to sing when she was young, although she had not yet been given the opportunity. During her performance of Extreme's "More Than Words", she dedicated the song to someone who she revealed "he knows" who he is. The concert was produced in support by TIM and Flocafe and was performed in front of a small audience of 300 people that were previously chosen through a contest by MAD TV. One month of preparation was put into the concert and it was made possible with 100 technicians, 20 musicians, and 11 cameramen over 10 days of rehearsal. Vandi chose to conduct her concert in a different manner than had been done for the Elena Paparizou concert, specifically by dancing into the crowd and singing rather than remaining stationary, as well as having a featured backing band, Blues Bug, that also had a role in main performances. Vandi did not sing in the performance of "Word Up", but instead danced onstage as it was performed by the frontman of Blues Bug. In their concert review, MAD TV praised Vandi for the unique atmosphere she gave the show through her connection to the audience, the band, and musical director, Tony Kontaxakis, making it more fun and "funky". The direction was by Vandi's long time music video director, Kostas Kapetanidis, while the sound recording was directed by Kostas Kalimeris. The concert was the second MAD Secret Concert and was televised by ANT1 in May 2006.

== Track listing ==
1. Intro
2. Beginning credits
3. "Ain't Nobody (Rufus & Chaka Khan)
4. Backstage Pt.1
5. "Play That Funky Music" (Wild Cherry)
6. "Think" (Aretha Franklin)
7. "I'm So Excited (The Pointer Sisters)
8. "Walking on Sunshine" (Katrina & the Waves)
9. "Last Night a DJ Saved My Life" (Indeep)
10. Backstage Pt.2
11. "Word Up" (Performed by Blues Bug) (Cameo)
12. "Don't Look Any Further" (Dennis Edwards feat. Siedah Garrett)
13. "It's Raining Men" (The Weather Girls)
14. Backstage Pt.3
15. "More Than Words" (Extreme)
16. "Sweet Dreams" (Eurythmics)
17. End credits

== Charts ==
Chart	Providers	Peak position
Greek DVD Chart	IFPI	1
Cypriot Album Chart	All Records Top 20	1
