= Opa Opa =

1992 song by Notis Sfakianakis

Single by Notis Sfakianakis

from the album Ise Ena Pistoli
- Released: 1992
- Genre: Laïko
- Label: EMI
- Songwriter: Giorgos Alkaios
- Producer: Giorgos Alkaios

Notis Sfakianakis singles chronology
"Ipopto" (1991)	"Opa Opa" (1992)	"Ise Ena Pistoli" (1992)

"Opa Opa" is a song by Greek singer Notis Sfakianakis, released as a single from his second album Ise Ena Pistoli in 1992. Opa Opa is a laïko dance song and was written and produced by singer Giorgos Alkaios in 1992.

The song has been covered by a number of artists, taking it to further success abroad. In 1999, Swedish-Greek duo Antique covered it as their debut single with Eurodance elements, reaching the top ten across Scandinavia. Despina Vandi recorded an English-language cover, which reached the top 20 of several markets in Europe and North America.

== Cover versions ==
=== Antique cover ===
"Opa Opa"

Single by Antique

from the album Mera Me Ti Mera
- B-side: "Rhythmos"
- Released: 5 July 1999
- Genre: Laïko; Eurodance
- Label: Virgin; Bonnier Amigo
- Songwriter: Giorgos Alkaios
- Producers: C&N Project; Per Adebratt

Antique singles chronology
"Opa Opa" (1999)	"Dinata Dinata" (1999)

Greek-Swedish Eurodance duo Antique covered the song and released it in July 1999 as the lead single from their debut album, Mera Me Ti Mera. Their version reached the top ten in Denmark, Norway, Romania, and Sweden.

==== Track listing ====
1. "Opa Opa" (radio edit) - 3:36
2. "Opa Opa" (extended mix) - 5:07
3. "Rhythmos" - 5:03

==== Music video ====
The music video was directed by Fred Wood and takes place in Egypt. A second video was also released.

==== Release history ====
Country	Date
Sweden	5 July 1999
Italy	4 August 1999
Greece	13 October 1999
Germany	3 January 2000

==== Charts and certifications ====
"Opa Opa" fared well in the charts and was Bonnier Amigo's first international hit release in 2000. It entered the Swedish charts on July 15, 1999, and remained for 16 weeks, peaking at number 5. The song entered the Norwegian charts where it peaked at nine staying charting for eight weeks. "Opa Opa" also charted in Switzerland where it peaked at number 51, charting for five weeks.

Chart (1999–2000)	Peak position
Denmark (IFPI)	3
Germany (GfK)	60
Italy (FIMI)	11
Norway (VG-lista)	9
Poland Airplay (Music & Media)	16
Romania (Romanian Top 100)	2
Sweden (Sverigetopplistan)	5
Switzerland (Schweizer Hitparade)	51

Country	Certifications
Denmark	Gold
Sweden	Platinum
Italy	Gold

=== Despina Vandi cover ===
"Opa Opa"

Single by Despina Vandi

from the album Gia
- Released: July 2004
- Genre: Laïko; dance-pop
- Label: Heaven Music; Central Station; Blanco Y Negro; Ultra Records
- Songwriters: Giorgos Alkaios; Phoebus
- Producer: Phoebus

Despina Vandi singles chronology
"Come Along Now" (2004)	"Opa Opa" (2004)	"Jambi" (2006)

With the success of her album Gia (2001) in Greece and neighbouring markets, Vandi embarked on a career abroad with remixes and English versions of her past songs, most notably "Gia", which entered the charts of several countries worldwide. She followed with "Come Along Now", from the album of the same name while "Opa Opa" was used as the second single from both aforementioned album and the international edition of Gia. For its release, the lyrics were rewritten in English and dance-pop elements were added into the Greek arrangement. Vandi's version has achieved the most success abroad, managing to reach the top ten and top twenty in several European markets.

==== Music video ====
The music video was directed by Kostas Kapetanidis. The video is shot over six scenes, with Vandi changing outfits a total of seven times. The video begins with a flash of Vandi's logo, while she can be faintly seen in a red bikini through translucent glass of a sauna; the same shot was used to create the cover of the single. The video returns to this scene numerous times throughout, sometimes with other females appearing in the shot and sometimes with Vandi and a male. It also features Vandi and friends sitting around and later dancing at a club, and on a boat, while there are a further two scenes of Vandi singing alone in front of a background, one of which she appears on top of a motorcycle. During the climax of the song, Vandi punches through glass with her bare fist.

==== Track listing ====
1. "Opa Opa" (Bass Bumpers video edit)
2. "Opa Opa" (Bigworld radio mix)
3. "Opa Opa" (Chippe mix)
4. "Opa Opa" (Milk & Sugar radio mix)
5. "Opa Opa" (Milk & Sugar vocal club mix)
6. "Opa Opa" (Bass Bumpers club mix)
7. "Opa Opa" (Armand Van Helden dub)
8. "Opa Opa" (Video)

==== Release history ====
Country	Date	Format
Greece	September 2004	EP
Spain	July 2004	Single
Germany	2 August 2004	Single
Australia	10 August 2004	Single

==== Charts ====
===== Weekly charts =====
Chart (2004–2005)	Peak position
Australia (ARIA)	82
Austria (Ö3 Austria Top 40)	54
Belgium (Ultratip Bubbling Under Flanders)	5
Belgium (Ultratip Bubbling Under Wallonia)	5
CIS Airplay (TopHit)	31
Denmark (Tracklisten)	14
Europe (Eurochart Hot 100)	31
Germany (GfK)	51
Greece (IFPI)	1
Hungary (Rádiós Top 40)	2
Italy (FIMI)	33
Spain (Promusicae)	15
Switzerland (Schweizer Hitparade)	81
US Hot Dance Radio Airplay (Billboard)	-

===== Year-end charts =====
Chart (2004)	Position
CIS (Tophit)	125
