= Pantelis Thalassinos =

Greek singer and songwriter

Pantelis Thalassinos Παντελής Θαλασσινός
- Born: June 11, 1958 (age 67); Keratsini, Greece
- Origin: Greece
- Genres: Contemporary laïko, laïko
- Occupation: Singer
- Instrument: Vocals
- Years active: 1981–present

Pantelis Thalassinos (Greek: Παντελής Θαλασσινός; born June 11, 1958) is a Greek singer and songwriter.

He was born in Keratsini, Piraeus. His father, Michalis, hailed from the island of Chios and his mother, Evangelia, from Serifos. He began performing in 1977, while also working in a shipping company until 1987, with the exception of his 22-month army service in 1980–81. Since then, he has devoted himself to his musical career. He co-founded the group Lathrepivates ("Stowaways") in 1986. Following its dissolution in 1991, he returned to his native Chios, where he founded the Myrovolos live stage. He returned to Athens and live performances in 1994, and is currently member of the Triphono group.

Pantelis Thalassinos has released six solo albums and has participated in more than 30, as a composer or guest singer.

== Sources ==
- https://web.archive.org/web/20110522051255/http://www.spectacles.gr/PT/PTbio.htm
- http://www.mousikorama.gr/thalassinos_pantelis.html%5B%5D
