= Jambi (Despina Vandi song) =

Single by Despina Vandi

from the album Special Edition: Stin Avli Tou Paradeisou
- Released: 2005
- Recorded: 2005
- Genre: Dance-pop, contemporary laïka
- Length: 4:47
- Label: Heaven Music; Ultra Records
- Songwriter(s): Phoebus
- Producer(s): Phoebus

Despina Vandi singles chronology
"Opa Opa" (2004)	"Jambi" (2005)	"Kalanta" (2006)

"Jambi" is the platinum selling single from the Special Edition version of the album Stin Avli Tou Paradisou by Greek singer Despina Vandi. It was released in Greece by Heaven Music and in the US by Ultra Records.

== Release history ==
Country	Date
Greece	2005
United States	21 November 2006

=== Charts ===
Chart	Peak position
Greece IFPI Top 50 Singles	1
Ukraine Top 40 Singles	50

== See also ==
- Despina Vandi
- Despina Vandi discography
