= Stin Avli Tou Paradeisou =

Stin Avli Tou Paradeisou Στην Αυλή του Παράδεισου

Studio album by Despina Vandi
- Released: 24 November 2004
- Recorded: Sierra studio
- Genre: Contemporary laika
- Length: 1:01:30
- Language: Greek
- Label: Heaven Music
- Producer: Phoebus

Despina Vandi chronology
Come Along Now (2004)	Stin Avli Tou Paradeisou; Στην Αυλή του Παράδεισου (2004)	Kalanta (2006)

Singles from Stin Avli Tou Paradeisou
- 1. "Happy End" Released: November 2004; 2. "Na Tin Hairesai" Released: February 2005; 3. "Stin Avli Tou Paradeisou" Released: May 2005; 4. "Jambi" Released: December 2005; 5. "Amane" Released: March 2006

Stin Avli Tou Paradeisou (Greek: Στην Αυλή Του Παράδεισου) is the sixth studio album by Greek singer Despina Vandi. It was released in Greece on 24 November 2004 by Heaven Music and certified 2× platinum, selling over 110,000 units. It was re-released with four new songs and a bonus DVD, and renamed Special Edition: Stin Avli Tou Paradeisou on 7 December 2005. With the combination of both releases, the album certified double-platinum in Greece.

Stin Avli Tou Paradeisou and its re-release Special Edition: Stin Avli Tou Paradeisou won Despina Vandi six awards over two years at Mad Video Music Awards. The first three awards were given to Vandi at the 2005 awards while the second three were awarded at the 2006 awards. Having won three each year made Vandi the artist with the most awards at both award shows.

== Track listing ==
All music is composed by Phoebus.

Original edition
No.	Title	Lyrics	Length
1.	"Happy End"	Phoebus	5:34
2.	"Akatamahiti Elxi" (Ακαταμάχητη Έλξη; Irresistible Attraction)	Phoebus	4:20
3.	"Na Tin Hairesai" (Να Την Χαίρεσαι; Enjoy Her)	Phoebus	4:54
4.	"Louloudi Mou" (Λουλούδι Μου; My Flower)	Phoebus	5:20
5.	"Pethanes" (Πέθανες; You Died)	Phoebus	4:27
6.	"To Proto Mas Fili" (Το Πρώτο Μας Φιλί; Our First Kiss)	Natalia Germanou	4:36
7.	"Prosefhomai" (Προσεύχομαι; I Pray)	Phoebus	4:53
8.	"Aharisti Ki Alitissa (ft. Vasilis Karras)" (Αχάριστη Και Αλήτισσα; Ungrateful Tramp)	Phoebus	5:12
9.	"Oi Horismenoi" (Οι Χωρισμένοι; Separated)	Natalia Germanou	3:35
10.	"Stin Avli Tou Paradeisou" (Στην Αυλή Του Παραδείσου; In The Garden Of Paradise)	Phoebus	4:55
11.	"Kan'To An M' Agapas (ft. Thanos Petrelis)" (Κάν' Το Αν Μ' Αγαπάς; Do It If You Love Me)	Natalia Germanou	5:25
12.	"Outro (Oi Peinasmenoi)" (Outro (Πεινασμένοι); Outro (Hungry))	Phoebus	8:19
Total length:			1:01:30

Special Edition
No.	Title	Lyrics	Music	Length
1.	"Jambi"	Phoebus	Phoebus	4:49
2.	"Skotose Me" (Σκότωσε Με; Kill Me)	Phoebus	Phoebus	4:01
3.	"Maska" (Μάσκα; Mask)	Phoebus	Phoebus	4:20
4.	"Amane (ft. Giorgos Mazonakis)" (Αμανέ; Amane)	Phoebus	Phoebus	3:10
5.	"Olo Leipeis - I Believe It" (Edition Noiseless, Warner Chappell Publishing Company)	H. Reith + M. Freeman	Phoebus	3:51
6.	"Happy End"	Phoebus	Phoebus	5:34
7.	"Akatamahiti Elxi" (Ακαταμάχητη Έλξη; Irresistible Attraction)	Phoebus	Phoebus	4:20
8.	"Na Tin Hairesai" (Να Την Χαίρεσαι; Enjoy her)	Phoebus	Phoebus	4:54
9.	"Louloudi Mou" (Λουλούδι Μου; My Flower)	Phoebus	Phoebus	5:20
10.	"Pethanes" (Πέθανες; You Died)	Phoebus	Phoebus	4:27
11.	"To Proto Mas Fili" (Το Πρώτο Μας Φιλί; Our First Kiss)	Natalia Germanou	Phoebus	4:36
12.	"Prosefhomai" (Προσεύχομαι; I Pray)	Phoebus	Phoebus	4:53
13.	"Aharisti Ki Alitissa (ft. Vasilis Karras)" (Αχάριστη Κι αλήτισσα; Ungrateful Tramp)	Phoebus	Phoebus	5:12
14.	"Oi Horismenoi" (Οι Χωρισμένοι; Separated)	Natalia Germanou	Phoebus	3:35
15.	"Stin Avli Tou Paradeisou" (Στην Αυλή Του Παραδείσου; In The Garden Of Paradise)	Phoebus	Phoebus	4:55
16.	"Kan' To An M' Agapas (ft. Thanos Petrelis)" (Καν' Το Αν Μ' Αγαπάς; Do It If You Love Me)	Natalia Germanou	Phoebus	5:25
Total length:				1:13:22

== Singles and music videos ==
"Happy End"

"Happy End" was the lead single from the album. The music video was directed by Kostas Kapetanidis and won a MAD Video Music Award for "Best Contemporary Laiko Video".

"Na Tin Hairesai"

"Na Ti Hairesai" was the second single from the album. The music video was directed by Kostas Kapetanidis.

"Stin Avli Tou Paradeisou"

"Stin Avli Tou Paradeisou" was the third and final single from the original album. The animated music video was directed by Kostas Kapetanidis and won MAD Video Music Awards for "Best Contemporary Laiko Video" and "Best Direction".

"Jambi"

"Jambi was the fourth single from the album and the first from the Special Edition. The music video was directed by Kostas Kapetanidis.

"Amane"

"Amane" was the fifth and final single from the album and is a blend of contemporary laiko and hip hop in a vocal duet between Vandi and Giorgos Mazonakis. The music video was directed by Nikos Soulis, and also features actress Katiana Balanika.

== Release history ==
Region	Date	Label	Format	Version
Greece	24 November 2004	Heaven Music	CD	Original release
Cyprus	24 November 2004	Heaven Music	CD	Original release
Greece	7 December 2005	Heaven Music	CD, digital download	Special Edition Re-release
Cyprus	7 December 2005	Heaven Music	CD, digital download	Special Edition Re-release

== Charts ==
Stin Avli Tou Paradeisou was successful in Greece, where it charted for 58 weeks, peaking at number 1, certifying platinum in its first week of release. It soon certified double-platinum and also certified platinum in Cyprus.

Chart	Peak position	Weeks	Certification
Greek Albums Chart	1	58	2×Platinum
Cypriot Albums Chart	1		Platinum

== Credits and personnel ==
=== Personnel ===
Hakan Bingolou: oud (tracks: 7) || säz (tracks: 7, 9)

Giannis Bithikotsis: baglama (tracks: 2, 5, 6, 10, 11) || bouzouki (tracks: 2, 5, 6, 10, 11, 12) || lute (tracks: 1) || tzoura (tracks: 1, 2, 3, 5, 6, 10, 11, 12)

Victoria Chalkiti: backing vocals (tracks: 1, 2, 5, 9, 11)

Giorgos Chatzopoulos: guitars (tracks: 1, 2, 3, 4, 5, 6, 7, 9, 10, 11, 12)

Akis Diximos: second vocal (tracks: 1, 2, 3, 4, 5, 6, 7, 9, 10)

Nektarios Georgiadis: backing vocals (tracks: 1, 2, 9, 11)

Antonis Gounaris: guitars, keyboards, orchestration, programming, tzoura (tracks: 8)

Manolis Karantinis: baglama, bouzouki, tzoura (tracks: 4)

Lefki Kolovou: cello (tracks: 11)

Trifon Koutsourelis: keyboards, programming (all tracks) || orchestration (tracks: 2, 4, 5, 6, 7, 9, 10, 11, 12) || strings arrangement (tracks: 11)

Vaggelis Lappas: whistle (tracks: 2)

Fedon Lionoudakis: accordion (tracks: 2, 3, 4, 9, 10, 11, 12)

Iris Louka: viola (tracks: 11)

Selmani Migken: violin (tracks: 2, 4, 10, 11)

Andreas Mouzakis: drums (tracks: 1, 2, 3, 4, 7, 10, 12)

Hakan Bingolou: oud (tracks: 7) / säz (tracks: 7, 9)

Alex Panagis: backing vocals (tracks: 1, 9, 11)

Phoebus: keyboards (tracks: 1, 3, 4, 5, 8) || orchestration (tracks: 1, 2, 3, 4, 5, 7, 8, 9, 10, 11, 12) || programming (tracks: 1, 3, 5, 8)

Giorgos Roilos: percussion (tracks: 1, 3, 5, 6, 7, 8, 9, 11, 12)

Nikos Vardis: bass (tracks: 1, 3, 7)

Thanasis Vasilopoulos: clarinet, ney (tracks: 7, 9)

Martha Zioga: backing vocals (tracks: 1, 2, 9, 11)

=== Production ===
Giannis Ioannidis (D.P.H.): mastering

Dimitris Mourlas: sound engineer

Vaggelis Papadopoulos: sound engineer

Panagiotis Petronikolos: mix engineer, sound engineer

Phoebus: executive producer

Vaggelis Siapatis: editing, sound engineer

Giorgos Stampolis: executive producer

Christos Zorbas: additional editing

=== Cover ===
Bill Georgousis: cover photographer

Panos Kallitsis: hair styling, make up

Kostas Lalas: studio photographer

Alexis Valourdos: photo processing

Credits adapted from the album's liner notes.
