= Gia (album) =

Gia Γεια

Studio album by Despina Vandi
- Released: 19 December 2001
- Recorded: Phase One studio
- Genre: Pop, electronic, dance, contemporary laika
- Length: 1:39:15
- Language: Greek
- Label: Heaven Music
- Producer: Phoebus

Despina Vandi chronology
Ipofero (2000)	Gia; Γεια (2001)	Ante Gia (2002)

Singles from Gia
- 1. "Gia" Released: 19 December 2001; 2. "Christougenna" Released: 25 December 2001; 3. "Lathos Anthropos" Released: February 2002; 4. "Anaveis Foties / Deste Mou Ta Matia" Released: April 2002; 5. "Olo Leipeis" Released: May 2002; 6. "Ela" Released: July 2002; 7. "Thelo Na Se Do" Released: November 2002

Gia (trans. Γεια; Hi) is the fifth studio album by Greek singer Despina Vandi. It was released on 19 December 2001 by Heaven Music and has sold more than 560,000 units (280,000 albums) and stands at five fold-platinum in Greece. Since release, it has been re-released several times and has become one of the best-selling albums of all time in Greece. According to the DVD "Guide of the Greek discography" which is compiled privately by Petros Dragoumanos, it is the best selling album for the last 20 years in Greece. In 2010, Alpha TV's Chart Show, which uses statistics also compiled by Mr. Dragoumanos, ranked the album as the third most successful album in terms of sales in Greece during 1985-2009 and the most successful album from 2000-2009. It also certified quadruple-platinum (24.000) in Cyprus and gold status (100.000) in Turkey. Additionally, the album was licensed to 35 territories.

A re-release titled Gia & Ante Gia Collector's Edition was later released on 21 March 2002 and includes two discs featuring the songs from the original album plus the songs from the EP "Ante Gia". Gia was also later released in the United States by Escondida Music in 2004 as her first international release with a slightly altered track listing. The first single "Gia" reached number one on the US Billboard Club Dance Airplay. Gia was later released in Australia by Central Station and in Romania on 1 March 2004. Following the success of the album, Vandi was awarded as Best Selling Greek Artist 2001 at the World Music Awards, held in Monaco on 6 March 2002.

== Track listing ==
All music is composed by Phoebus.

Disc One: Original edition
No.	Title	Lyrics	Length
1.	"Gia" (Γεια; Hi)	Phoebus	4:13
2.	"Mono Agapi Sou Zito" (Μόνο Αγάπη Σου Ζητώ; I Only Seek Your Love)	Phoebus	5:22
3.	"Lathos Anthropos" (Λάθος Άνθρωπος; The Wrong Person)	Phoebus	4:20
4.	"Ti Kano Moni Mou" (Τι Κάνω Μόνη Μου; The Things I Do - When I'm Alone)	Phoebus	4:47
5.	"Thelo Na Se Do" (Θέλω Να Σε Δω; I Want To See You)	Natalia Germanou	5:02
6.	"Ah Kardoula Mou" (Αχ Καρδούλα Μου; Oh My Little Heart)	Phoebus	4:27
7.	"Deka Meres, Deka Nihtes" (Δέκα Μέρες, Δέκα Νύχτες; Ten Days, Ten Nights)	Phoebus	4:35
8.	"Olo Leipeis" (Όλο Λείπεις; You 're Always Away)	Phoebus	5:06
9.	"Vges Ap' To Mialo Mou" (Βγες Απ' Το Μυαλό Μου; Get Out Of My Head)	Phoebus	5:48
10.	"Ola Odigoun Se Sena" (Όλα Οδηγούν Σε Σένα; Everything Leads To You)	Giannis Rentoumis	4:26
11.	"Anaveis Foties" (Ανάβεις Φωτιές; Fire Starter)	Phoebus	4:22
Total length:			52:30

All music is composed by Phoebus.

Disc Two: Original edition
No.	Title	Lyrics	Length
1.	"Paixe Mazi Mou" (Παίξε Μαζί Μου; Play With Me)	Phoebus	4:42
2.	"Ela" (Έλα; Come)	Natalia Germanou	4:21
3.	"Deste Mou Ta Matia" (Δέστε Μου Τα Μάτια; Blind Fold Me)	Phoebus	4:03
4.	"Hrone" (Χρόνε; Time)	Phoebus	4:57
5.	"To Magazaki Tis Kardias Mou" (Το Μαγαζάκι Της Καρδιάς Μου; My Heart's Little Shop)	Phoebus	4:48
6.	"Eimai Ego" (Είμαι Εγώ; It's Me)	Natalia Germanou	4:09
7.	"Marameno" (Μαραμένο; Withered)	Phoebus	4:23
8.	"Kommatia" (Κομμάτια; Pieces)	Phoebus	4:45
9.	"Kapoies Fores" (Κάποιες Φορές; Sometimes)	Phoebus	5:06
10.	"Christougenna" (Χριστούγεννα; Christmas)	Phoebus	5:18
Total length:			46:35

All music is composed by Phoebus.

Turkish edition
No.	Title	Lyrics	Length
1.	"Gia (Hi)"	Phoebus	4:13
2.	"Fire Starter"	Phoebus	4:22
3.	"Blind Fold Me"	Phoebus	4:03
4.	"Withered"	Phoebus	4:23
5.	"I Want To See You"	Natalia Germanou	5:02
6.	"I Only Seek Your Love"	Phoebus	5:22
7.	"You're Always Away"	Phoebus	5:06
8.	"The Wrong Person"	Phoebus	4:20
9.	"My Heart's Little Shop"	Phoebus	4:48
10.	"Everything Leads To You"	Giannis Rentoumis	4:26
11.	"The Things I Do - When I'm Alone"	Phoebus	4:47
12.	"Gia (Hi)"	Phoebus	4:13

Disc One: International edition
No.	Title	Lyrics	Music	Length
1.	"Gia (English Version)"	Phoebus	Phoebus	3:00
2.	"Opa Opa (English Version)"	Giorgos Alkaios, Freeman, Reith, Raith, Boss	Giorgos Alkaios	3:42
3.	"Simera"	Phoebus	Phoebus	5:08
4.	"I Melodia Tis Monaksias"	Phoebus	Phoebus	6:04
5.	"Thimisou"	Phoebus, Vaggelis Konstantinidis	Phoebus	4:41
6.	"Mono Agapi Sou Zito"	Phoebus	Phoebus	5:23
7.	"Lathos Anthropos"	Phoebus	Phoebus	4:19
8.	"Ti Kano Moni Mou"	Phoebus	Phoebus	4:47
9.	"Thelo Na Se Do"	Natalia Germanou	Phoebus	5:03
10.	"Ah Kardoula Mou"	Phoebus	Phoebus	4:26
11.	"Deka Meres Deka Niktes"	Phoebus	Phoebus	4:34
12.	"Olo Lipis"	Phoebus	Phoebus	5:06

All music is composed by Phoebus.

Disc Two: International edition
No.	Title	Lyrics	Length
1.	"Vges Apo To Mialo Mou"	Phoebus	5:47
2.	"Ola Odigoun Se Sena"	Giannis Rentoumis	4:25
3.	"Anavis Foties"	Phoebus	4:23
4.	"Gia (Original Version)"	Phoebus	4:13
5.	"Pexe Mazi Mou"	Phoebus	4:44
6.	"Ela"	Natalia Germanou	4:23
7.	"Deste Mou Ta Matia"	Phoebus	4:05
8.	"Chrone"	Phoebus	4:59
9.	"To Magazaki Tis Kardias Mou"	Phoebus	4:48
10.	"Ime Ego"	Natalia Germanou	4:10
11.	"Marameno"	Phoebus	4:26
12.	"Kommatia"	Phoebus	4:45

Australian edition
No.	Title	Lyrics	Music	Length
1.	"Gia (UK Radio Edit)"	Phoebus	Phoebus	3:01
2.	"Come Along Now (English Version) (feat. Bo)"	Phoebus	Phoebus	3:53
3.	"I Believe It (Olo Leipeis)"	Phoebus	Phoebus	3:50
4.	"Anaveis Foties"	Phoebus	Phoebus	4:22
5.	"Thelo Na Se Do"	Natalia Germanou	Phoebus	5:02
6.	"Opa Opa"	Giorgos Alkaios; Freeman; Reith; Raith; Boss	Giorgos Alkaios	3:38
7.	"C'est La Vie (Simera)"	Phoebus	Phoebus	3:39
8.	"Ola Odigoun Se Sena"	Giannis Rentoumis	Phoebus	4:26
9.	"Lathos Anthropos"	Phoebus	Phoebus	4:20
10.	"Ela"	Natalia Germanou	Phoebus	4:21
11.	"Deste Mou Ta Matia"	Phoebus	Phoebus	4:03
12.	"Thimisou"	Phoebus; Vaggelis Konstantinidis	Phoebus	4:40
Total length:				49:15

Romanian edition
No.	Title	Lyrics	Music	Length
1.	"Gia (UK Radio Edit)"	Phoebus	Phoebus	3:01
2.	"Come Along Now (English Version) (feat. Bo)"	Phoebus	Phoebus	3:53
3.	"I Believe It (Olo Lipis)"	Phoebus	Phoebus	3:50
4.	"Anavis Fotis"	Phoebus	Phoebus	4:22
5.	"Thelo Na Se Do"	Natalia Germanou	Phoebus	5:03
6.	"Opa Opa (Milk & Sugar Radio Mix)"	Giorgos Alkaios, Freeman, Reith, Raith, Boss	Giorgos Alkaios	3:38
7.	"Ola Odigoun Se Esena"	Giannis Rentoumis	Phoebus	4:24
8.	"C' est La Vie (Simera)"	Phoebus	Phoebus	3:39
9.	"Lathos Anthropos"	Phoebus	Phoebus	4:18
10.	"Ela"	Natalia Germanou	Phoebus	4:22
11.	"Deste Mou Ta Matia"	Phoebus	Phoebus	4:05
12.	"Thimisou"	Phoebus, Vaggelis Konstantinidis	Phoebus	4:40
13.	"Ah Kardoula Mou"	Phoebus	Phoebus	4:26
14.	"Opa Opa (Bass Bumpers Video Edit)"	Giorgos Alkaios, Freeman, Reith, Raith, Boss	Giorgos Alkaios	3:32
15.	"Opa Opa Videoclip"	Giorgos Alkaios, Freeman, Reith, Raith, Boss	Giorgos Alkaios
Total length:				57:13

A side: Bulgarian edition (Cassette)
No.	Title	Lyrics	Music	Length
1.	"Gia (UK Radio Edit)"	Phoebus	Phoebus	3:01
2.	"Come Along Now (English Version)"	Phoebus	Phoebus	3:53
3.	"I Believe It (Olo Lipis)"	Phoebus	Phoebus	3:50
4.	"Anavis Fotis"	Phoebus	Phoebus	4:22
5.	"Thelo Na Se Do"	Natalia Germanou	Phoebus	5:03
6.	"Opa Opa (English Version)"	Giorgos Alkaios, Freeman, Reith, Raith, Boss	Giorgos Alkaios	3:38
7.	"C est La Vie (Simera)"	Phoebus	Phoebus	3:39
8.	"Ola Odigoun Se Esena"	Giannis Rentoumis	Phoebus	4:24

B side: Bulgarian edition (Cassette)
No.	Title	Lyrics	Music	Length
1.	"Lathos Anthropos"	Phoebus	Phoebus	4:18
2.	"Ela"	Natalia Germanou	Phoebus	4:22
3.	"Deste Mou Ta Matia"	Phoebus	Phoebus	4:05
4.	"Thimisou"	Phoebus, Vaggelis Konstantinidis	Phoebus	4:40
5.	"Mono Agapi Sou Zito"	Phoebus	Phoebus	5:23
6.	"Ti Kano Moni Mou"	Phoebus	Phoebus	4:47
7.	"Ah Kardoula Mou"	Phoebus	Phoebus	4:26
8.	"Deka Meres Deka Niktes"	Phoebus	Phoebus	4:34

== Singles and music videos ==
The following singles were officially released to radio stations and made into music videos. The songs "Mono Agapi Sou Zito", "Ti Kano Moni Mou", "Ah Kardoula Mou", "Ola Odigoun Se Sena" and "Marameno", despite not having been released as singles, managed to gain radio airplay.

- "Gia"
- "Christougenna"
- "Lathos Anthropos"
- "Anaveis Foties / Deste Mou Ta Matia"
- "Olo Leipeis"
- "Ela"
- "Thelo Na Se Do"

== Release history ==
Region	Date	Label	Format	Version
Greece	19 December 2001	Heaven	CD	Original
Greece	21 March 2002	Heaven	CD, digital download	Gia + Ante Gia
Cyprus	19 December 2001	Heaven	CD	Original
Cyprus	21 March 2002	Heaven	CD	Gia + Ante Gia
Turkey	2002	Mega Müzik	CD, MC	Turkish edition
United States	7 September 2004	Ultra/Escondida	CD, digital download	International edition
Australia	2004	Central Station	CD, digital download	Australian edition
Romania	1 March 2004	Mach 1 Records	CD	Romanian edition
Bulgaria	2004	KA Music Plus	MC	Bulgarian edition

== Charts ==
Chart	Providers	Peak position	Certification
Greek Albums Chart	IFPI	1	4×Platinum
Cypriot Albums Chart	Musical Paradise Top 10	1	4×Platinum
Turkish Albums Chart	Turkey Charts	1	Gold

== Credits and Personnel ==
Credits adapted from the album's liner notes.

=== Personnel ===
- Dimos Beke: backing vocals (tracks: 1-1, 1-2, 1-3, 1-4, 1-6, 1-7, 1-8, 1-9, 1-11, 2-1, 2-3, 2-4, 2-9, 2-10) || second vocal (tracks: 1-3, 1-10, 2-9)
- Hakan Bingolou: oud, säz (tracks: 2-3)
- Giannis Bithikotsis: baglama, bouzouki, tzoura (tracks: 1-3, 1-6, 1-7, 2-2, 2-5, 2-8)
- Panagiotis Charamis: bass (tracks: 2-9)
- Giorgos Chatzopoulos: guitars (tracks: 1-2, 1-3, 1-6, 1-7, 1-9, 1-10, 1-11, 2-1, 2-2, 2-3, 2-4, 2-5, 2-6, 2-7, 2-8, 2-9, 2-10)
- Achilleas Diamantis: guitars (tracks: 2-9)
- Pavlos Diamantopoulos: bass (tracks: 1-3, 1-6, 1-7, 2-3, 2-5, 2-7, 2-8)
- Akis Diximos: second vocal (tracks: 1-3, 1-7, 2-5, 2-8)
- Antonis Gounaris: cümbüş (tracks: 1-5) || guitars (tracks: 1-5, 1-6)
- Paola Komini: backing vocals (tracks: 1-5, 1-6, 2-7)
- Fedon Lionoudakis: accordion (tracks: 1-3, 1-6, 1-7, 2-5, 2-7, 2-8)
- Andreas Mouzakis: drums (tracks: 1-3, 2-7, 2-9, 2-10)
- Alex Panagis: backing vocals (tracks: 1-6, 2-2, 2-3, 2-7) || second vocal (tracks: 1-5, 1-6, 2-5, 2-7)
- Elena Patroklou (tracks: 1.1, 1.2, 1.8, 1.9, 2.1, 2.4, 2.10)
- Phoebus: backing vocals (tracks: 1-1) || keyboards, programming (tracks: 1-1, 1-2, 1-4, 1-8, 1-9, 2-1, 2-4, 2-7, 2-9, 2-10) || orchestration (all tracks)
- Sandy Politi: backing vocals (tracks: 1-2, 1-3, 1-4, 1-5, 1-9, 1-11, 2-1, 2-2, 2-4, 2-7, 2-9, 2-10)
- Giorgos Roilos: harmonica (tracks: 2-2) || percussion (tracks: 1-3, 1-6, 1-7, 1-11, 2-2, 2-3, 2-5, 2-7, 2-8)
- Thanasis Vasilopoulos: clarinet (tracks: 1-5, 2-3, 2-7) || mizmar (tracks: 2-3) || ney (tracks: 2-7)
- Alexandros Vourazelis: keyboards, programming (tracks: 1-3, 1-5, 1-6, 1-7, 1-10, 1-11, 2-2, 2-3, 2-5, 2-6, 2-8) || orchestration (tracks: 1-3, 1-6, 1-7, 1-10, 2-2, 2-5, 2-8)
- Nikos Zervas: keyboards (tracks: 2-7)
- Martha Zioga: backing vocals (tracks: 1-3, 1-4, 1-5, 1-6, 1-11, 2-2, 2-7)

=== Production ===
- Tasos Chamosfakidis: sound engineer
- Thodoris Chrisanthopoulos (Fabelsound): mastering
- Phoebus: executive producer
- Vaggelis Siapatis: editing, sound engineer
- Manolis Vlachos: mix engineer, sound engineer
- Alexandros Vourazelis: sound engineer

=== Cover ===
- Costas Coutayar: photographer
- Panos Kallitsis: hair styling, make up
