= Kalanta (EP) =

EP by Despina Vandi
- Released: November 21, 2006 (Greece)
- Recorded: 2005–2006
- Genre: Laïka Contemporary laïka, dance
- Length: 18:18
- Language: Greek
- Label: Heaven Music

Kalanta (English: Carols) is an EP by popular Greek artist Despina Vandi. It was released on 22 November 2006 by Heaven Music. The album went double platinum. Kalanta was the best selling CD single for 2006 by a female artist.

== Track listing ==
No.	Title	Lyrics	Music	Length
1.	"Kalanta" (Κάλαντα; Carols)	Phoebus	Phoebus	5:05
2.	"Mehri Mai Mina" (Μέχρι Μάη μήνα; Until the month of May)	Phoebus	Pheobus	4:31
3.	"An De M' Agapas" (Αν δε μ' αγαπάς; If you don't love me)	Phoebus	Phoebus	5:08
4.	"Ta Lefta" (Τα λεφτά; Money)	Phoebus	Phoebus	3:34
Total length:				18:18

== Singles ==
"Kalanta"

"Kalanta" was the first single released from the EP and a music video was made.

"Mehri Mai Mina"

"Mehri Mai Mina" was the second single release from the EP and a music video was made.

== Charts ==
Kalanta peaked at number one on the Greek Singles Chart (where EPs chart in Greece) and stay there for 5 weeks. The EP was certified double platinum, selling 31,000 units.

Chart	Peak position	Certification
Greece (IFPI)	1	2× Platinum
Cyprus (Musical Paradise)	1	Platinum

== Credits and personnel ==
Personnel

- Hakan Binkolou - cubus, sazi
- Akis Diximos - background vocals
- Pantelis Gkertsos - solo guitar
- Giorgos Hatzopoulos - guitars (acoustic, twelve-string, electric)
- Trifon Koutsourelis - orchestration, programming, keyboards
- Giannis Mpithikotsis - bouzouki, baglama, tzoura, lute
- Phoebus - music, lyrics, orchestration, programming, keyboards
- Giorgos Roilos - percussion
- Penelope Skalkotou from Spiros Lambrou's Children's Choir - vocals
- Despina Vandi - vocals
- Thanasis Vasilopoulos - ney, clarinet, mismas

Production

- Thodoris Hrisanthopoulos - mastering
- Vasilis Nikolopoulos - sound, mixing
- Phoebus - production manager
- Vaggelis Siapatis - sound, computer editing
- Giorgos Stampolis - production
- Leon Zervos - mastering

Design

- Alexandra Katsaiti - styling
- Stefanos Vasilakis - hair
- Manos Vinihakis - make up
- Tasos Vrettos - cover photo

Credits adapted from the album's liner notes.

== Official remixes ==
- 2006: Jingle bells (Kalanta English Version)
- 2007: Ta Lefta (Remix)
- 2007: An De M' Agapas (DJ NV NRG Mix)

== Cover versions ==
- 2007: Anelia - Dyh (Κάλαντα; Анелия - Дъх) (Bulgaria)
- 2007: Teodora - Smeshna cena (Τα λεφτά; Теодора - Смешна Цена) (Bulgaria)
