= Ipofero =

2000 single by Despina Vandi

"Ipofero" "Υποφέρω"

Single by Despina Vandi
- Language: Greek
- Released: 13 December 2000
- Recorded: Phase One studio
- Length: 17:52
- Label: Minos EMI
- Songwriter: Phoebus
- Producer: Achilleas Theofilou

Despina Vandi singles chronology
"Profities" (1999)	"Ipofero" "Υποφέρω" (2000)	"Geia" (2001)

Singles from Ipofero
- 1. "Ipofero" Released: December 2000; 2. "Lipamai" Released: March 2001

"Ipofero" (trans. Υποφέρω; I Suffer) is the second EP by Greek artist Despina Vandi. It was released on 13 December 2000 by Minos EMI and certified six times platinum in Greece, selling 120,000 units. It was entirely written by Phoebus and was awarded as being the highest-selling Greek CD single at Virgin Megastores and generally in Greece, by Richard Branson of Virgin Group. The EP also certified four times platinum in Cyprus.

== Track listing ==
No.	Title	Lyrics	Music	Length
1.	"Ipofero" (Υποφέρω; I suffer)	Phoebus	Phoebus	5:18
2.	"Stamata Na Mou Kollas" (Σταμάτα Να Μου Κολλάς; Stop Suffocating Me)	Phoebus	Phoebus	3:46
3.	"Lipamai" (Λυπάμαι; I'm Sorry)	Phoebus	Phoebus	4:30
4.	"Mi Mou Kleineis To Fos" (Μη Μου Κλείνεις Το Φως; Don't Turn Off Light To Me)	Phoebus	Phoebus	4:18
Total length:				17:52

== Singles and music videos ==
All the tracks was released as singles at radio stations and gained massive airplay. The following two official singles were released with music videos and both were directed by Kostas Kapetanidis.

- "Ipofero" (I Suffer) (Directed by Kostas Kapetanidis)
- "Lipamai" (I'm Sorry) (Directed by Kostas Kapetanidis)

== Release history ==
Region	Date	Format	Label
Greece	13 December 2000	CD single	Minos EMI
Cyprus	13 December 2000	CD single	Minos EMI

== Charts ==
Chart	Providers	Peak position	Certification
Greek Singles Chart	IFPI	2	6×Platinum
Cypriot Singles Chart	Musical Paradise Top 10	2	4×Platinum

== Credits and personnel ==
=== Personnel ===
- Giannis Bithikotsis: mandolin (tracks: 3)
- Giorgos Chatzopoulos: guitars (tracks: 2, 3)
- Katerina Kiriakou: backing vocals (tracks: 2)
- Andreas Mouzakis: drums (tracks: 3)
- Alex Panagis: backing vocals (tracks: 2)
- Phoebus: computer backing vocals (tracks: 4) || keyboards (tracks: 1) || orchestration (all tracks) || programming (tracks: 1, 2)
- Alexandros Vourazelis: keyboards (tracks: 2, 3, 4) || orchestration (tracks: 2) || programming (all tracks)
- Martha Zioga: backing vocals (tracks: 2)

=== Production ===
- Thodoris Chrisanthopoulos (Fabelsound): mastering
- Vaggelis Siapatis: editing, sound engineer
- Achilleas Theofilou: executive producer
- Manolis Vlachos: mix engineer, sound engineer
- Alexandros Vourazelis: sound engineer

=== Cover ===
- Panos Kallitsis: hair styling, make up
- Kostas Kapetanidis: photographer
- Giannis Sarlis: artwork

Credits adapted from the album's liner notes.

== Official remixes ==
- Μawahh (Faithless Vs. Despina Jandi)

In 2005, Faithless released a remix of the song "Ipofero" as a b-side in the LP "The Remixes Vol. 1". The remix was entitled "Μawahh" and by typing mistake in the cover, Despina Vandi's name written Despina Jandi (Faithless Vs. Despina Jandi).

== Cover versions ==
- 2001: Panterite - Tancyvasht cvyat (Μη μου κλείνεις το φως; Пантерите - Танцуващ свят) (Bulgaria)
- 2002: Kosta Markov - Izgaryam (Υποφέρω; Коста Марков - Изгарям) (Bulgaria)
- 2003: Jelena Karleuša - Jos te volim (Υποφέρω; I still love you) (Serbia)
- 2005: Magic De Spell - Ipofero (Υποφέρω) (Greece)
- 2015: The String Theory Ensemble - Ipofero (Υποφέρω) (Greece)
