= Come Along Now =

Single by Phoebus featuring Despina Vandi

from the album Come Along Now
- Released: 24 June 2004
- Genre: House; pop
- Length: 3:51
- Label: Heaven Music; Ultra Records
- Songwriter: Phoebus
- Producer: Phoebus

Despina Vandi singles chronology
"Gia" (2003)	"Come Along Now" (2004)	"Opa Opa" (2004)

Alternative cover
- Spanish cover

"Come Along Now" is a song by Greek singer Despina Vandi released by Heaven Music in 2004. In the spring of 2004, Phoebus teamed up with Coca-Cola to compose the tune that would accompany all of Coca-Cola's activities in its Olympic sponsorship agreement. Phoebus composed the song "Come Along Now" with Despina Vandi singing it, and the tune was heard all around the world in Coca-Cola's ads.

== Music video ==
The music video for "Come Along Now" was once again directed by Kostas Kapetanidis. It features Vandi in three different scenes: posing in a photoshoot, lying down, and caught in a rope animal trap. The other scene in the video is of people dancing in a club, with frequent advertisements for Coca-Cola. Phoebus makes a cameo appearance in the video overseeing Vandi's photoshoot.

== Track listing ==
- Greek release
1. "Come Along Now" (English Version) (Rap: Bo) - 3:51
2. "Come Along Now" (Greek-English Version) (Rap: Giannis Patelis) - 3:51
3. "Phoebus Band Remix" - 5:54
4. "Paralos" (Instrumental) - 3:20
- Greek re-release
1. "Come Along Now" (English Version) - 3:51
2. "Phoebus Band Remix" - 5:54
3. "Paralos" (Instrumental) - 3:20
4. "Come Along VS Gia" (Radio Edit) - 4:38
5. "Come Along VS Gia" (Extended Mix) - 6:06
- US release
1. "Come Along Now" (Original Radio Edit) - 3:14
2. "Come Along Now VS. Gia" (Radio Edit) - 4:39
3. "Come Along Now VS. Gia" (Extended) - 6:08
4. "Phoebus Band Mix" - 5:55
5. "Come Along Now" (Instrumental) - 3:52
- US release (12")
1. "Phoebus Band Remix" - 5:55
2. "Come Along Now" (Radio Edit) - 3:54
3. "Come Along Now VS Gia" (Extended Version) - 6:06
4. "Come Along Now" (Instrumental) - 3:51
- Spanish release
1. "Come Along Now" (XTM Airplay Remix) - 4:15
2. "Come Along Now" (XTM Extended Club Remix) - 6:04
3. "Come Along Now" (Original Greek-English Version) - 3:53

== Charts and certifications ==
=== Weekly charts ===
Weekly chart performance for "Come Along Now"
Chart (2004)	Peak position
CIS Airplay (TopHit)	1
Greece (IFPI)	1
Russia Airplay (TopHit)	1
Spain (PROMUSICAE)	14

=== Year-end charts ===
2004 year-end chart performance for "Come Along Now"
Chart (2004)	Position
CIS (TopHit)	12
Russia Airplay (TopHit)	6

2011 year-end chart performance for "Come Along Now"
Chart (2011)	Position
Ukraine Airplay (TopHit)	153

=== Certifications ===
Certifications for "Come Along Now"
Region	Certification	Certified units/sales
Greece (IFPI Greece)	Platinum	20,000^{^}
^{^} Shipments figures based on certification alone.

== Release history ==
Country	Date	Format(s)	Label(s)	Ref.
Greece	24 June 2004	CD	Heaven Music	
Russia	30 August 2004	Contemporary hit radio	Megalayner	
United States	23 November 2004	Digital download, CD, vinyl	Ultra Records	
