= Gia (song) =

Single by Despina Vandi

from the album Gia
- Released: December 19, 2001
- Length: 4:09
- Label: Heaven Music; Ultra
- Songwriter(s): Phoebus
- Producer(s): Phoebus (with co-production by Bass Bumpers)

Despina Vandi singles chronology
"Ande Gia" (2002)	"Gia" (2001)	"Come Along Now" (2004)

Alternative cover
- Australian two-track edition cover

"Gia" is a song recorded by Greek singer Despina Vandi. It was originally released as the lead single off her 2001 multi-platinum Greek album also of the same name. Vandi signed with Ultra Records for the international release of the track, and in 2003 a CD single was made available in many markets, following by a 2004 US re-issued which included a new English-language version.

"Gia" (the Greek word for "Hi") is best known for its blending of Arabic drums, modern laïka, Eurodance-influenced beats and bilingual lyrics. It is also the first foreign-language Dance recording to top the Billboard Hot Dance Airplay chart, where it peaked at number one in 2004.

"Gia" stayed on the Billboard charts for 12 weeks and made Vandi one of six artists that stayed the most weeks on the charts in 2004.

The track has also been mashed-up with another Vandi single, "Come Along Now", which was released in 2004 as "Come Along Now Vs. Gia". It is featured on the Ministry of Sound's The Annual 2005.

According to the Greek "Chart Show" and IFPI, the song is in the third position in the Top 30 with the best songs of the most successful Greek artists during 2000–2009.

== Music video ==
The original music video of the song was directed by Kostas Kapetanidis and was set in a temple with Vandi and four male dancers and featured a young child. In 2003, a new video was made for the Greek-English release of the song, which was also directed by Kapetanidis and was shot in Morocco.

== Track listing ==
- US 12" vinyl
1. "Gia" (DJ Gregory Remix)
2. "Gia" (Milk & Sugar Remix)
3. "Gia" (Bass Bumpers Extended Remix)
4. "Gia" (Level K Remix)
- Greece and US CD single
1. "Gia" (Bass Bumpers Radio Edit) – 3:00
2. "Gia" (Original) – 4:09
3. "Gia" (Milk & Sugar Radio Edit) – 3:19
4. "Gia" (DJ Gregory Remix) – 7:59
5. "Everything I Dreamed" – 3:18
6. "Gia" (Video)
- US EP
1. "Gia" (Radio Edit)
2. "Gia" (Milk & Sugar Radio Edit)
3. "Gia" (Original Mix)
4. "Gia" (Extended Mix)
5. "Gia" (Milk & Sugar Remix)
6. "Gia" (DJ Gregory Remix)
7. "Gia" (Level K Remix)

== Charts ==
Chart (2001–2004)	Peak position
Australia (ARIA)	35
Belgium (Ultratop 50 Flanders)	42
Europe (Eurochart Hot 100)	56
Finland (Suomen virallinen lista)	20
Germany (GfK)	36
Greece (IFPI)	1
Hungary (Dance Top 40)	22
Netherlands (Single Top 100)	55
Romania (Romanian Top 100)	8
Spain (PROMUSICAE)	19
Sweden (Sverigetopplistan)	25
Switzerland (Schweizer Hitparade)	73
US Dance Club Songs (Billboard)	39

== Release history ==
Country	Release date	Format
Greece	December 19, 2001	
Various	September 22, 2003	
United States	August 27, 2004	EP
United States	November 21, 2004	CD single
