= Paradinomai: I Megaliteres Epitihies =

Greatest hits album by Elli Kokkinou
- Released: November 2003
- Genre: Pop, modern laika, dance
- Label: Sony Music Greece/Columbia

Elli Kokkinou chronology
Sto Kokkino (2003)	Paradinomai: I Megaliteres Epitihies (2003)	SEX (2005)

Paradinomai: I Megaliteres Epitihies (I surrender) is the first greatest hits album by Greek artist Elli Kokkinou, released in November 2003 by Sony Music Greece.

== Album Background ==
The compilation features many songs that had not attained much mainstream success from Elli Kokkinou's first two albums- Epikindyna Paihnidia and Andriki Kolonia- released under her former record company, Sony Music Greece. At the time of its release her newer music from Heaven Music was topping the charts and had made her a household name, offering the opportunity for her former record label to capitalize on her newly acquired marketability through her back catalogue discography. Therefore, this "greatest hits" compilation is somewhat misleading because it does not contain any of her subsequent bigger hit singles.

Elli Kokkinou returned to the record company in 2007.

== Track listing ==
1. "Epikindyna Paihnidia"
2. "Pao Pao"
3. "Na Ta Mas Pali"
4. "Auto Tha Kano"
5. "Gia Mia Fora"
6. "Prepei"
7. "Kapoia Mera"
8. "Ego De Tha Hatho"
9. "Kammeno Sidero"
10. "Andriki Kolonia"
11. "Paradinomai"
12. "Den Tha Haseis"
13. "Den Hreiazetai"
14. "Giati Na Ipohoro"
15. "Paramythenio Asteri"
16. "Stamata"
17. "Prospatho"
