= To Paichnidi Einai Pleon Diko Mou =

Single by Thanos Petrelis
- Released: December 2008 (Greece)
- Recorded: 2008, Power Music Studio
- Genre: Pop, modern laika
- Length: 15:06
- Label: Heaven Music
- Songwriter(s): Phoebus
- Producer(s): Phoebus

"To Paichnidi Einai Pleon Diko Mou" (Greek:Το Παιχνίδι Είναι Πλέον Δικό Μου; English: The game is now mine) is a CD single by popular Greek artist Thanos Petrelis released in December 2008 by Heaven Music. It supported by a Casino Rio advertisement, where the music video of the song "To Paichnidi Einai Pleon Diko Mou" was filmed, co-starring Phoebus and Olga Farmaki and directed by Manolis Tzirakis

== Track listing ==
- "To paichnidi einai pleon diko mou" - 4:29
- "Na Hamogelas" - 3:21
- "Efcharisto" - 3:02
- "Xypna Thanasi" (remix) - 4:12

== Credits and Personnel ==
Personnel

- Giorgos Hatzopoulos - guitars
- Telis Kafkas - electric bass
- Vasilis Nikolopoulos - drums
- Giannis Mpithikotsis - bouzouki, tzoura, baglama
- Akis Diximos - second vocals
- Victoria Halkiti - second vocals
- Alex Panayi - second vocals, background vocals
- Nektarios Georgiadis - background vocals
- Phoebus - music, lyrics, programming, orchestration, keyboards, piano
- Konstantinos Souvatzoglou - remix of "Ksipna Thanasi"

Production

- Thodoris Hrisanthopoulos - digital mastering - transfer
- Vaggelis Siapatis - sound
- Phoebus - production management, mix

Design

- Thodoris Psiahos - photos
- Christos Sagkounis - artwork

Credits adapted from the album's liner notes.
