= Eimai akomi eleftheros =

Eimai Akomi Eleftheros Είμαι Ακόμη Ελεύθερος

Studio album by Thanos Petrelis
- Released: June 20, 2007
- Recorded: Power Music studio
- Genre: Pop, Modern Laika
- Length: 50:39
- Language: Greek
- Label: Heaven Music
- Producer: Phoebus

Thanos Petrelis chronology
Eftihos (2006)	Eimai Akomi Eleftheros; Είμαι Ακόμη Ελεύθερος (2007)	Ksipna Thanasi (2008)

Eimai Akomi Eleftheros (trans. Είμαι Ακόμη Ελεύθερος; I'm Still Free) is the title of 3rd album by Greek artist Thanos Petrelis. It was on June 20, 2007, and was certified Gold status, selling over 25,000 units. The album is written (music - lyrics) entirely by Phoebus, apart from the track "Etsi Eimai" which the lyrics is written by Natalia Germanou.

== Track listing ==
No.	Title	Lyrics	Music	Length
1.	"Lathos" (Λάθος; Mistake)	Phoebus	Phoebus	3:38
2.	"Doksa Soi" (Δόξα Σοι; Glory To You)	Phoebus	Phoebus	4:02
3.	"Adiorthoti" (Αδιόρθωτη; Unyielding)	Phoebus	Phoebus	3:30
4.	"Me Ipotimises" (Με Υποτίμησες; You Underestimated Me)	Phoebus	Phoebus	4:46
5.	"Aman Kai Pos" (Αμάν Και Πως; I Would Do Everything)	Phoebus	Phoebus	3:26
6.	"An Den Eiha Ki Esena" (Αν Δεν Είχα Κι Εσένα; If I Didn't Have You)	Phoebus	Phoebus	5:56
7.	"Ligo Akoma" (Λίγο Ακόμα; A Little More)	Phoebus	Phoebus	4:32
8.	"Eisai Oti Eho Kai Den Eho" (Είσαι Ότι Έχω Και Δεν Έχω; You're Everything I Have)	Phoebus	Phoebus	4:48
9.	"Mesa Mou" (Μέσα Μου; Within Me)	Phoebus	Phoebus	3:50
10.	"Etsi Eimai" (Έτσι Είμαι; That's How I am)	Natalia Germanou	Phoebus	3:51
11.	"Mesa Mou (Derti Version)" (Μέσα Μου (Derti Version); Within Me (Derti Version))	Phoebus	Phoebus	4:09
12.	"Me Ipotimises ("Allaksan Ta Aisthimata Mou" Version)" (Με Υποτίμησες ("Άλλαξαν Τα Αισθήματα Μου" Version); You Underestimated Me ("My Feelings Have Changed" Version))	Phoebus	Phoebus	4:11
Total length:				50:39

== Singles ==
The following tracks was released as singles at radio, that was gained a lot of airplay.

- Lathos (Mistake)
- Adiorthoti (Unyielding)
- Me Ipotimises (You Underestimated Me)
- Aman Kai Pos (I Would Do Everything)
- An Den Eiha Ki Esena (If I Didn't Have You)

== Music videos ==
1. Lathos (Mistake)
2. Adiorthoti (Unyielding)
3. An Den Eiha Ki Esena (If I Didn't Have You)

== Credits and personnel ==
Personnel

- Arrangement: Trifon Koutsourelis (tracks: 1, 2, 3, 4, 5, 6, 7, 8), Giannis Lionakis (tracks: 11, 12), Phoebus (tracks: 1, 2, 3, 4, 5, 6, 7, 8, 9, 10)
- Backing vocals: Victoria Chalkiti (tracks: 3, 5, 8, 10), Nektarios Georgiadis (tracks: 5, 8, 10), Alex Panayi (tracks: 3, 6, 9, 10)
- Baglama: Giannis Lionakis (tracks: 3, 9, 12), Giannis Mpithikotsis (tracks: 1, 7, 8)
- Bass: Panagiotis Charamis (tracks: 1, 2, 4, 5, 6, 9), Telis Kafkas (tracks: 11, 12)
- Bouzouki: Giannis Lionakis (tracks: 11, 12), Giannis Mpithikotsis (tracks: 1, 7, 8)
- Clarinet: Stavros Pazaretzis (tracks: 5, 10), Thanasis Vasilopoulos (tracks: 2)
- Cura: Giannis Mpithikotsis (tracks: 1, 7, 8)
- Drums: Spiros Dorizas (tracks: 1, 11, 12), Vasilis Nikolopoulos (tracks: 2, 4, 6, 9)
- Guitars: Giorgos Chatzopoulos (tracks: 1, 2, 3, 4, 5, 6, 7, 8, 9, 10), Achilleas Diamantis (tracks: 1, 2, 3, 6, 7, 8, 9), Giannis Lionakis (tracks: 11, 12),
- Keyboards, Programming: Trifon Koutsourelis (tracks: 1, 2, 3, 4, 5, 6, 7, 8), Giannis Lionakis (tracks: 11, 12), Phoebus (tracks: 9, 10)
- Lute: Giannis Lionakis (tracks: 3, 9, 11, 12)
- Ney: Thanasis Vasilopoulos (tracks: 2)
- Outi, Säzi: Hakan (tracks: 5, 9)
- Percussion: Sotiris Chontos (tracks: 3, 11), Giorgos Roilos (tracks: 2, 5)
- Second vocal: Akis Diximos (tracks: 1, 2, 4, 5, 6, 7, 8, 9, 10)
- Violin: Christos Mpousdoukos (tracks: 3, 6, 9)

Production

- Artwork: Antonis Glikos
- Editing: Vaggelis Siapatis
- Executive producer: Phoebus
- Grooming: Vasilis Mpouloumpasis
- Mastering: Thodoris Chrisanthopoulos [Fabel Sound]
- Mixing: Vasilis Nikolopoulos
- Photographer: Nikos Vardakastanis
- Production manager: Giorgos Stampolis
- Recording: Vasilis Nikolopoulos, Vaggelis Siapatis
- Styling: Christos Alexandropoulos
