= Eftihos =

Single by Thanos Petrelis
- Released: June 2006 (Greece)
- Recorded: 2006, Studio Power Music
- Genre: Pop, modern laika
- Length: 18:22 (total)
- Label: Heaven Music
- Songwriter(s): Phoebus
- Producer(s): Phoebus

"Eftihos" (Greek:Ευτυχώς; is a platinum CD single by popular Greek artist Thanos Petrelis released in June 2006 by Heaven Music.The CD single is entirely composed by Phoebus.

== Track listing ==
No.	Title	Lyrics	Music	Length
1.	"Intro"		Phoebus	0:51
2.	"Anifora" (Ανηφόρα)	Phoebus	Phoebus	4:51
3.	"Danika" (Δανεικα)	Phoebus	Phoebus	4:36
4.	"Eftihos" (Ευτυχώς)	Phoebus	Phoebus	4:06
5.	"Den me horaei o topos" (Δεν με χωράει ο τόπος)	Phoebus	Phoebus	3:53
Total length:				18:22

== Music videos ==
- "Anifora"
- "Eftihos"

== Release history ==
Region	Date	Format	Label
Greece	June 2006	CD single	Heaven Music
Cyprus	June 2006	CD single	Heaven Music

== Credits and personnel ==
Personnel

- Phoebus - music, lyrics, orchestration, programming
- Tryfon Koutsourelis - orchestration, programming, keyboards
- Giorgos Hatzopoulos - guitars
- Achilleas Diamantis - guitars
- Giannis Bithikotsis - bouzouki, tzoura, baglama
- Fedon Lionoudakis - accordion
- Alex Panayi, Paola Komini - background vocals
- Vasilis Nikolopoulos - drums, Taiko Drums
- Panagiotis Haramis - bass
- Thanasis Vasilopoulos - nei
- Elli Kokkinou - second vocals

Production

- Thodoris Hrisanthopoulos - digital mastering - transfer
- Vaggelis Siapatis - sound, computer editing
- Phoebus - production management
- Vasilis Nikolopoulos - sound, mix

Design

- Nikos Vardakastanis - photos
- Petros Parashis - artwork

Credits adapted from the album's liner notes.
