= Elli Kokkinou =

Greek singer (born 1970)

Elli Kokkinou Έλλη Κοκκίνου
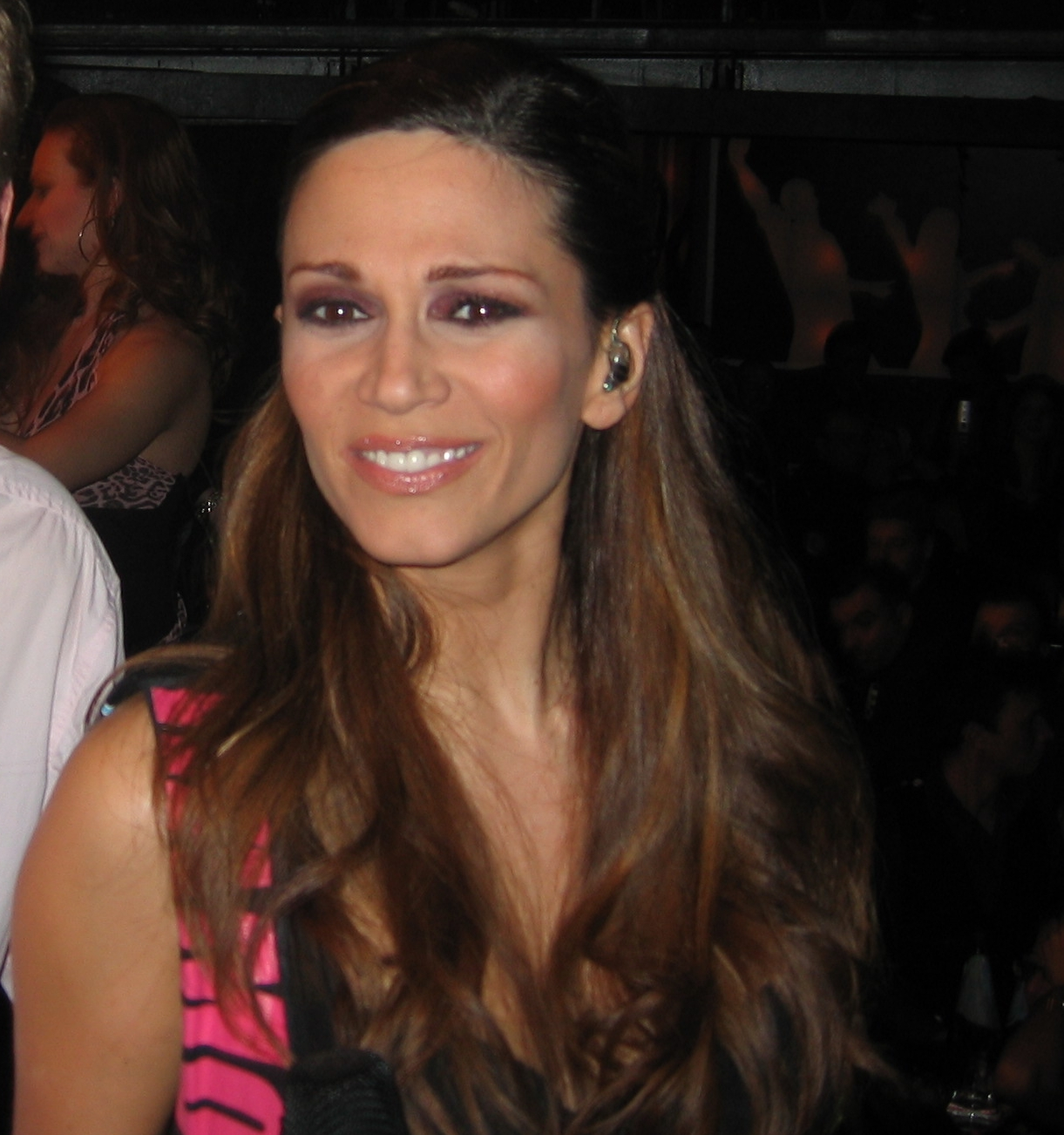

Background information
- Born: Ellie Papathanasopoulou; 24 July 1970 (age 56); Athens, Greece
- Genres: Contemporary laïka, folk, dance-pop
- Labels: Heaven; Sony Greece; The Spicy Effect; Cobalt; Panik Records

Elli Kokkinou (Greek: Έλλη Κοκκίνου, IPA: [ˈeli koˈcinu]; born 24 July 1970) is a Greek singer. She is among the most popular singers in Greece today and has performed together with many notable Greek names of the music industry such as Anna Vissi, Glykeria, Paschalis Terzis, Sakis Rouvas, Tolis Voskopoulos, Thanos Petrelis, Natassa Theodoridou, Despina Vandi, Giorgos Tsalikis and Kalomoira. Kokkinou has been certified for the sales of 135 thousand albums by IFPI Greece. On 14 March 2010, Alpha TV ranked Kokkinou the 27th top-certified female artist in the nation's phonographic era (since 1960).

== Career ==
=== Early life and beginnings ===
Elli Kokkinou grew up in a family with a love of music. From a young age, Elli showed interest in music and was also part of the dance group at her school. Her father encouraged her to listen to music, mostly jazz, while her mother encouraged her to listen to more mainstream music, such as disco. At age five she started ballet, while at home she sang and danced for her parents at night. She soon began classic guitar courses at the Attiko Conservatory, and after that, acoustic and electric guitar lessons for another three years. Kokkinou was also very interested in sports and for six years before she finished school, she was on a water ski team. On the team she won third place in a pan-Hellenic championship as well as many gold medals. Upon graduation Kokkinou wrote her first band called "Anonimi" (Anonymous). At the same time she completed examinations and was accepted to the school Vakalo where she studied graphic, free and architectural drawing and art history.

Elli Kokkinou first professionally dealt with music in 1990 with the request of the famous Kostas Tournas. Soon after, Kokkinou collaborated with many big names at the clubs such as Antonis Vardis, Tolis Voskopoulos, Anna Vissi, Pashalis Terzis, Glykeria, Eleni Dimou, and many more. At the same time Kokkinou also provided backing vocals for a number of artists' albums.

In 1992, Elli Kokkinou moved to Los Angeles, CA where she studied for two years voice and piano at the Musicians Institute of Technology. Her relocation to the United States offered her the chance to be taught by strong names in the music industry such as Carl Schroeder, pianist for Sarah Voaghn, and Scott Henderson. In 1994 she graduated and returned to Greece.

=== 1996–2002: Kapia Mera, Epikindyna Paihnidia, and Andriki Kolonia ===
In 1996, Elli Kokkinou signed a contract with Sony Music Greece and in 1998 she released her first CD single titled Kapia Mera (Someday). Music was by Antonis Vardis, with lyrics by Manou Tsilimidis and Gioula Gerorgiou.

In 1999, Elli Kokkinou released her debut album titled Epikindyna Paihnidia (Dangerous games). In 2000 she released her second album titled Andriki Kolonia (Male cologne). The song "Pao Pao" became a hit single off the album.

=== 2002–2004: Sto Kokkino ===
In 2002, she signed with Heaven Music and the following year, she started collaborating with popular songwriter Phoebus. In May 2003, she released the album Sto Kokkino (In red) which was one of the most successful releases in Greece of the year, reaching double platinum status. The album's first platinum certification was attained within two months and was also a great success in neighboring Turkey. Kokkinou performed with Giorgos Mazonakis in the song "To Gucci Ton Masai" which made it into the Greek top ten. Following the success of Sto Kokkino, her former label Sony Music released a greatest hits album titled Paradinomai (I'm surrendering). Following the platinum status, Sto Kokkino was repackaged as Sto Kokkino Platinum Edition in 2004 with four bonus songs including a duet with Giorgos Tsalikis and a DVD. The four new songs became instant hits, while the re-release helped push the certification up to 2× platinum.

On April 14, 2005, Elli Kokkinou won the international award for "Best New International Artist" by the "Union of Journalists of Turkey" (MGD), as her songs from Sto Kokkino were big hits in Turkey.

Nikos Kourkoulis, Elli Kokkinou & Natassa Theodoridou at club "Votanikos" in 2006

=== 2005–2006: SEX ===
Following a series of concerts in the United States and Australia with Christos Dantis, Elli Kokkinou returned in the summer of 2005 and began recording songs for her next studio album with Phivos. On November 10, 2005, Kokkinou released her fourth studio album titled SEX which was certified gold on the day of its release. The album shortly reached platinum status and was repackaged on November 13, 2006, as Ki' Allo Platinum Edition (More). Ki' Al'lo featured 4 new songs and a bonus DVD, including a duet with Thanos Petrelis and the French-language version of the single "SEX" first performed at the "MAD Music Video Awards" in 2006. For the winter season of 2006–2007, Kokkinou performed with Petrelis at club "Apollon".

=== 2007–2009: Eilikrina ===
On April 1, 2007, Elli announced on her official website that she had left Heaven Music and Phoebus stating she would like more creative input as one of her reasons. She also stated that Heaven Music had offered her to resign, which she decided not to do. Following a couple months without a label, Elli announced in July 2007 that she had signed with her original label Sony BMG Greece.

In September 2007, she started appearances with Nikos Kourkoulis and Natassa Theodoridou at club "Votanikos". In November 2007, she released her fifth studio album titled Eilikrina (Honestly). The album peaked at number 2 on the Greek IFPI charts, while her lead single "Lypamai Eilikrina" peaked at number 2 on the Nielsen's Greece Radio Airplay Chart. The album quickly certified gold. Due to her pregnancy, she stopped singing at Votanikos club on January 5, 2008, and Sarbel replaced her.

In November 2008, Kokkinou released a song titled "Mi Ta Paratas" with music by Dimitris Kontopoulos, which was the title track to the Greek film "O Ilias Tou 16ou". She also recorded a track titled "Demenes" for the Barbie movie "I Barbie Kai To Diamantenio Kastro", releasing the video through her official Myspace page.

In late March 2009, she released a digital single titled "Pame Ksana" (Let's go again) composed by Dimitris Kontopoulos with lyrics by Alexandra Zakka. In June 2009 Elli started performing at club Romeo, marking the first time in a year that she was back on a stage. In October 2009 Kokkinou embarked on a North American tour, appearing in cities in the United States and Canada. It was the most successful tour by any female Greek singer in North America since 2004.

=== 2010–present: Greek Idol and Ta Genethlia Mou ===
On 11 December 2009, Kokkinou officially signed a five-year contract with Phoebus's new record label, The Spicy Effect, the very same day that Nino signed his. As a result, Kokkinou will once again collaborate with Phoebus on her new album. Speaking at the signing, Kokkinou stated that the first single from her upcoming album written by Phoebus has been recorded and will be released in January. On January 22, 2010, Kokkinou released a digital single titled "Ontos" (Indeed), which featured rapper Ypochthonios. A remix followed, while in March 2010, Kokkinou released another digital single titled "Apohoro" (I'm departing).

On 23 July 2010, Kokkinou kicked off a summer tour across Greece and Cyprus with Despina Vandi. For the winter season, Kokkinou will be appearing with Vasilis Karras at club FIX in Thessaloniki set to kick off on October 22, 2010. Songwriter Phoebus has written them a duet titled "Den Tin Palevo" which premiered on October 12, 2010. Her new album is expected to be released in November 2010.

On 26 October 2010, Alpha TV announced that Elli Kokkinou will be a judge for season 2 of reality singing competition Greek Idol, which started in February 2011., In late October 2010 she embarked on a joint North American tour with Despina Vandi and Kosta Karafotis. On 9 December 2011, she released the studio album Ta Genethlia Mou (My Birthday), her first since 2007's Eilikrina, and her first on The Spicy Effect. The album was released as a Deluxe Digipak, featuring a booklet and fifteen songs in total. The album was certified platinum in March 2012. For promotion of the album, Kokkinou collaborated with singers Despina Vandi and Nikos Oikonomopoulos for a concert series at club Fever for the 2011-2012 winter season. Following the concert series, Kokkinou continued performing with Oikonomopoulos in Thessaloniki at club "Thea" from 24 August until October 2012.

In May 2012, she opened an English language nursery school in the Athens suburb of Glyfada called Happy Faces. When asked why she decided to open a nursery school, she stated the idea came about a year and a half prior when she was reading the story "Bondo in Kindergarten" to her son Alexander about a little bear that attended nursery school. In a personal statement posted on the nursery school's official website, Kokkinou elaborates that she wanted to create a place that was happy, colorful, and fairytale like, that felt more like home rather than a school.

In September 2012, after over 160,000 votes from around the world, Kokkinou was awarded "Best Song in the Balkans from Republic of Greece for 2011" at the Balkan Music Awards for her song "Eroteftika". On October 15, 2012, Elli released a new single entitled "Kardia Apo Giali" (Heart of Glass). The song reached number one on over 20 radios stations in Greece within its first week of release, and generated over 75,000 views on YouTube within the first week.

== Personal life ==
In the 1990s, Elli Kokkinou was in a relationship with fellow singer Dionisis Schinas. Later, in 2000, she began dating her business manager, Panayiotis Vassiliadis, and in September 2007 the two married. She became a stepmother to his three children from a previous marriage. In December 2007, she revealed that she was pregnant with her first child after much media scrutiny. In May 2008 Kokkinou gave birth to a boy. After much speculation and no public joint appearance of the two in six months, Kokkinou and her son moved to a new house in March 2010 with the couple announcing their divorce shortly after. From September 2010 to Summer 2017, was dating Greek basketball player Georgios Bogris. Kokkinou has hails from the village Epitalio.

== Discography ==
=== Studio albums ===
All the albums listed underneath were released and charted in Greece and Cyprus.

Year	Title	Certification
1999	Epikindyna Paihnidia	—
2000	Andriki Kolonia	—
2003	Sto Kokkino	2× Platinum
2005	SEX/Ki Allo Platinum Edition	Platinum
2007	Eilikrina	Gold
2011	Ta Genethlia Mou	2× Platinum
2017	Afti Eimai Ego	—
2021	Ta Sinesthimata Mou	—
2026	ΤΒΑ	—

=== CD singles ===
Year	Title	Notes
1998	"Kapoia Mera"	—

=== Compilations ===
Year	Title	Notes
2003	Paradinomai	—

=== Digital singles ===
Year	Title	Notes
2008	"Min Ta Paratas"	"O Ilias Tou 16ou"
2008	"Demenes"	"Barbie & The Diamond Castle"
2008	"Me Odigisi Oikologiki"	TV Spot
2009	"Pame Ksana"	—
2012	"Kardia Apo Giali"	—
2013	"Kalinyhta"	—
2014	"Matia Kleista"	—
2015	"As Ftaio Panta Ego"	—
2016	"Makari"	—
2016	"To Hamogelo Sou"	—
2016	"O Theos Einai Ginaika"	—
2018	"Ola Lathos"	—
2018	"Ximeromata Savatou"	—
2019	"Taxe Mou"	—
2020	"Na Tin Agapas"	—
2021	"Ti Eho Travixei"	—

== Filmography ==
=== Television ===
Year	Title	Role(s)	Notes
2004	MAD Video Music Awards	Herself (performance)	TV special
2006	The Red Suite	Elina Alienti	Episode: "Diva"
2006	MAD Video Music Awards	Herself (performance)	TV special
2009	MAD Video Music Awards	Herself (performance)	TV special
2011	Greek Idol	Herself (judge)	Season 2
2017	Your Face Sounds Familiar	Herself (judge)	Season 4
2018	MadWalk - The Fashion Music Project	Herself (performance)	TV special
2018	Greece's Got Talent	Herself (guest judge)	Judge Cut #5; season 6
2022	Easter at Home with MEGA with Elli Kokkinou	Herself (host)	Episode 17; season 3
2022	MadWalk - The Fashion Music Project	Herself (performance)	TV special
2024	Just the 2 Of Us	Herself (guest judge)	Live 13; season 8
2025-today	Don't Forget the Lyrics!	Herself (host)	Sunday game show on ANT1; season 3

=== Music videos ===
Year	Music video	Artist
1996	"San Me Koitas"	Kostas Chrisis & Herself
1998	"Kapoia Mera"	Herself
2000	"Na Ta Mas Pali"	Herself
2001	"Pao Pao"	Herself
2003	"Kosmotheoria"	Herself
2003	"Sorry"	Herself
2003	"Den Ginetai"	Herself
2004	"Erota Mou / Agori Mou"	Herself
2004	"Auto To Kalokairi"	Herself
2004	"Bye Bye"	Giorgos Tsalikis & Herself
2005	"Tha Perimeno"	Herself
2005	"SEX"	Herself
2006	"Ti Tis Eheis Vrei"	Herself
2006	"Itan Psema"	Herself
2006	"Ki Allo"	Herself
2007	"Adiaforos"	Thanos Petrelis & Herself
2007	"Lypamai Eilikrina"	Herself
2008	"Eisai O,ti Thelo"	Herself
2008	"Pes Mou Ena Psema"	Herself
2008	"Min Ta Paratas"	Herself
2008	"Demenes"	Herself
2008	"Me Odigisi Oikologiki"	Herself
2009	"Pame Xana"	Herself
2010	"Ontos"	Ipo & Herself
2010	"Apohoro"	Herself
2010	"Hristougenna"	Spicy Artists & Herself
2011	"Eroteutika"	Herself
2011	"Ta Genethlia Mou"	Herself
2012	"Kardia Apo Giali"	Herself
2013	"Kalinihta"	Herself
2014	"Matia Kleista"	Herself
2015	"As Ftaio Panta Ego"	Herself
2016	"Makari"	Herself
2016	"O Theos Einai Ginaika"	Herself
2018	"Ola Lathos"	Herself
2019	"Taxe Mou"	Herself
2020	"Na Tin Agapas"	Herself
2021	"Ti Eho Travixei"	Herself
2021	"Krataei Chronia	Herself
2022	"Mou 'hei stoixisei"	Herself
2024	"Misoteleiomeni"	Herself
2025	"De se afora"	Herself
2025	"Kapia Pou Den Agapas"	Herself
