= Sto Kokkino =

Sto Kokkino Στο Κόκκινο

Studio album by Elli Kokkinou
- Released: 15 May 2003
- Recorded: Phase One studio
- Genre: Pop, Modern laika
- Length: 58:19
- Language: Greek
- Label: Heaven Music
- Producer: Phoebus

Elli Kokkinou chronology
Andriki Kolonia (2000)	Sto Kokkino; Στο Κόκκινο (2003)	Paradinomai: Oi Megaliteres Epitihies (2004)

Singles from Sto Kokkino
- 1. "Masai" Released: May 2003; 2. "De Ginetai" Released: July 2003; 3. "Sorry" Released: September 2003; 4. "Agori Mou" Released: November 2003; 5. "Thelo Tosa Na Sou Po" Released: January 2004; 6. "Kosmotheoria" Released: March 2004; 7. "Erota Mou" Released: May 2004; 8. "Afto To Kalokairi" Released: July 2004

Sto Kokkino (Greek: Στο Κόκκινο; English: In The Red) is the third studio album by Greek artist, Elli Kokkinou. It was released on 15 May 2003 by Heaven Music and certified gold in the summer, but after five months gained platinum certification, selling 40,000 units. The album was written by Phoebus, with remaining lyrics by Natalia Germanou and Vaggelis Konstantinidis.

== Track listing ==
All music is composed by Phoebus

No.	Title	Lyrics	Length
1.	"Masai"	Phoebus	4:20
2.	"De Ginetai" (Δε Γίνεται; It's Impossible)	Phoebus	4:29
3.	"Sorry"	Phoebus	4:02
4.	"Apokalipsi" (Αποκάλυψη; Revelation)	Phoebus	5:04
5.	"Eimai Kala" (Είμαι Καλά; I'm Fine)	Natalia Germanou	4:23
6.	"Agori Mou" (Αγόρι Μου; My Boy)	Phoebus	4:09
7.	"Thelo Tosa Na Sou Po (ft. Nino)" (Θέλω Τόσα Να Σου Πω; I Want To Tell You So Much)	Natalia Germanou	3:51
8.	"Kosmotheoria" (Κοσμοθεωρία; Worldview)	Phoebus	4:06
9.	"Kainourgia Arhi" (Καινούργια Αρχή; New Beginning)	Phoebus	4:52
10.	"Fila Me" (Φίλα Με; Kiss Me)	Vaggelis Konstantinidis	5:20
11.	"Hartaetos" (Χαρταετός; Kite)	Vaggelis Konstantinidis	4:06
12.	"Erota Mou" (Έρωτα Μου; My Love)	Phoebus	3:21
13.	"Afto To Kalokairi" (Αυτό Το Καλοκαίρι; This Summer)	Phoebus	4:24
14.	"Outro"		1:52
Total length:			58:19

== Singles ==
The following singles were officially released to radio stations and made into music videos, except the song "Erota Mou", and gained a lot of airplay.

- "Masai"
- "De Ginetai" (It's Impossible)
- "Sorry"
- "Agori Mou" (My Boy)
- "Thelo Tosa Na Sou Po" (I Want To Tell You So Much)
- "Kosmotheoria" (Worldview)
- "Erota Mou" (My Love)
- "Afto To Kalokairi" (This Summer)

== Credits ==
Credits adapted from liner notes.

=== Personnel ===
- Dimos Beke – backing vocals (tracks: 3)
- Hakan Bingolou – oud, säz (tracks: 4)
- Giannis Bithikotsis – bouzouki (tracks: 2, 6, 8, 11, 12) / cura (tracks: 2, 5, 6, 8, 11) / baglama (tracks: 2, 6, 8, 11)
- Panagiotis Charamis – bass (tracks: 9)
- Giorgos Chatzopoulos – guitars (tracks: 1, 2, 3, 4, 5, 6, 8, 9, 10, 11, 12, 13)
- Akis Diximos – second vocal (tracks: 1, 2, 6, 8, 10, 11, 12)
- Rania Dizikiriki – backing vocals (tracks: 2, 6, 8, 9, 12, 13)
- Antonis Gounaris – orchestration, programming, keyboards (tracks: 2) / guitars (tracks: 2, 7)
- Trifon Koutsourelis – orchestration, programming, keyboards (tracks: 3, 4, 5, 6, 7, 8, 10, 11, 12, 13) / guitars (tracks: 7, 13)
- Alex Leon – orchestration, programming, keyboards (tracks: 9)
- Fedon Lionoudakis – accordion (tracks: 1, 2, 6, 8, 11, 12)
- Alex Panagi – backing vocals (tracks: 3, 4, 5, 9, 13)
- Phoebus – orchestration (tracks: 1, 4, 6, 7, 8, 9, 11, 12) / programming, keyboards, claps (tracks: 1) / backing vocals (tracks: 1, 3)
- Giorgos Roilos – percussion (tracks: 1, 3, 4, 5, 12)
- Vaggelis Siapatis – backing vocals, claps (tracks: 1)
- Giorgos Stabolis – backing vocals (tracks: 3) / claps (tracks: 1)
- Antigoni Tsiplakidou – backing vocals (tracks: 3, 4, 5)
- Thanasis Vasilopoulos – clarinet (tracks: 4)
- Martha Zioga – backing vocals (tracks: 2, 4, 5, 6, 8, 9, 12, 13)

=== Production ===
- Al Giga – styling
- Giannis Ioannidis (Digital Press Hellas) – mastering
- Konstantinos Kagkas – hair styling
- Giorgos Klaromenos – imagine director
- Lefteris Neromiliotis – mix engineer
- Phoebus – executive producer
- Panos Pitsilidis – art direction
- Vaggelis Siapatis – computer editing, sound engineer
- Giorgos Stabolis – computer editing
- Katerina Tsatsani – photographer
- Alexis Valourdos – imagine director
- Manolis Vlachos – mix engineer

== Charts ==
Sto Kokkino made its debut at number 1 on the 'Top 50 Greek Albums' charts by IFPI.

After months, it was certified platinum according to sales.

Chart	Provider	Peak position	# Weeks	Certification
Top 50 Greek Albums	IFPI	1	65	Platinum

== Sto Kokkino: Platinum Edition ==
Sto Kokkino: Platinum Edition Στο Κόκκινο: Platinum Edition

Studio album by Elli Kokkinou
- Released: 27 October 2004
- Recorded: Sierra studio
- Genre: Modern laika
- Length: 1:15:33
- Language: Greek
- Label: Heaven Music
- Producer: Phoebus

Elli Kokkinou chronology
Paradinomai: Oi Megaliteres Epitihies (2004)	Sto Kokkino: Platinum Edition; Στο Κόκκινο: Platinum Edition (2004)	Sex (2005)

Singles from Sto Kokkino
- 1. "Gine" Released: October 2004; 2. "Bye Bye" Released: December 2004; 3. "Tha Perimeno" Released: February 2005

Sto Kokkino: Platinum Edition is the re-release of third studio album Sto Kokkino by Greek artist, Elli Kokkinou. It was released on 27 October 2004 by Heaven Music and received double-platinum certification, selling other 40,000 units. Ιn one of the songs featuring Giorgos Tsalikis. It also includes a DVD with music videos, photos, and interviews.

== Track listing ==
All music is composed by Phoebus

No.	Title	Lyrics	Length
1.	"Gia Sena" (Για Σένα; For You)	Phoebus	4:37
2.	"Gine" (Γίνε; Become)	Vaggelis Konstantinidis	4:13
3.	"Bye Bye (ft. Giorgos Tsalikis)"	Phoebus	3:48
4.	"Tha Perimeno" (Θα Περιμένω; I'll Wait)	Phoebus	4:36
5.	"Masai"	Phoebus	4:20
6.	"De Ginetai" (Δε Γίνεται; It's Impossible)	Phoebus	4:29
7.	"Sorry"	Phoebus	4:02
8.	"Apokalipsi" (Αποκάλυψη; Revelation)	Phoebus	5:04
9.	"Eimai Kala" (Είμαι Καλά; I'm Fine)	Natalia Germanou	4:23
10.	"Agori Mou" (Αγόρι Μου; My Boy)	Phoebus	4:09
11.	"Thelo Tosa Na Sou Po (ft. Nino)" (Θέλω Τόσα Να Σου Πω; I Want To Tell You So Much)	Natalia Germanou	3:51
12.	"Kosmotheoria" (Κοσμοθεωρία; Worldview)	Phoebus	4:06
13.	"Kenourgia Arhi" (Καινούργια Αρχή; New Beginning)	Phoebus	4:52
14.	"Fila Me" (Φίλα Με; Kiss Me)	Vaggelis Konstantinidis	5:20
15.	"Hartaetos" (Χαρταετός; Kite)	Vaggelis Konstantinidis	4:06
16.	"Erota Mou" (Έρωτα Μου; My Love)	Phoebus	3:21
17.	"Afto To Kalokairi" (Αυτό Το Καλοκαίρι; This Summer)	Phoebus	4:24
18.	"Outro"		1:52
Total length:			1:15:33

== DVD ==
DVD contains the video clips of following songs:

1. "Kosmotheoria"
2. "Sorry"
3. "De Ginetai"
4. "Afto To Kalokeri + MAD Version"
5. "Erota Mou + Agori Mou" (medley)
6. "To Gucci Ton Masai" (ft. Giorgos Mazonakis)
7. "Thelo Tosa Na Sou Po" (ft. Nino)

== Singles ==
The following singles were officially released to radio stations and made into music videos, except the song "Gine", and gained a lot of airplay.

- "Gine" (Become)
- "Bye Bye"
- "Tha Perimeno" (I'll Wait)

== Credits ==
Credits adapted from liner notes.

=== Personnel ===
- Giannis Bithikotsis – bouzouki, cura, baglama (tracks: 2, 4)
- Victoria Chalkiti – backing vocals (tracks: 1, 2, 3)
- Akis Diximos – second vocal (tracks: 1, 2)
- Nektarios Georgiadis – backing vocals (tracks: 1)
- Antonis Gounaris – orchestration, programming, keyboards (tracks: 2) / guitars (tracks: 1, 2, 3, 4) / cura (tracks: 3)
- Trifon Koutsourelis – orchestration, programming, keyboards (tracks: 1, 2, 3, 4)
- Andreas Mouzakis – drums (tracks: 1, 3)
- Alex Panagi – backing vocals (tracks: 2, 3)
- Phoebus – orchestration (tracks: 1, 3)
- Giorgos Roilos – percussion (tracks: 2)
- Martha Zioga – backing vocals (tracks: 2, 3)

=== Production ===
- Giannis Ioannidis (Digital Press Hellas) – mastering
- Konstantinos Kagkas – hair styling
- Vaggelis Kiris – photographer
- Vanesa Koutsopodiotou – make up
- Vaggelis Papadopoulos – sound engineer
- Panagiotis Petronikolos – mix engineer
- Phoebus – executive producer
- Panos Pitsilidis – art direction
- Thodoris Psiachos – photographer
- Vaggelis Siapatis – computer editing, sound engineer
- Katerina Tsatsani – photographer

== Charts ==
Sto Kokkino: Platinum Edition made its debut at number 3 on the 'Top 50 Greek Albums' charts by IFPI.

After months, it was certified double-platinum according to sales.

Chart	Provider	Peak position	# Weeks	Certification
Top 50 Greek Albums	IFPI	3	33	2×Platinum
