= Nino discography =

Nino Greece & Cyprus discography
- Studio albums: 6
- Singles: 22
- Music videos: 16

This page is the discography of the Greek artist Nino.

== Discography ==
=== Studio albums ===
Year	Title	Certification	Label
2004	Nino*Nino*Nino	Platinum	Heaven Music
2005	Eilikrinis	Gold	Heaven Music
2006	Epireastika	—	Heaven Music
2007	Thavmata	—	Heaven Music
2009	I Parastasi Arxizei	—	Heaven Music
2015	Erhetai I Nihta	—	Heaven Music

=== Singles ===
Title	Year	Peak chart positions	Album
Title	Year	GRE	Album
"Sa Navagoi"	2003	1	Nino, Nino, Nino
"Fovamai"	2004	—	Eilikrinis
"Epireastika"	2006	8	Epireastika
"Eimai Enas Allos"	2006	2	Epireastika
"Theos"	2010	3	Non-album single
"Christougenna 2010"	2010	—	Non-album single
"14 Flevari"	2011	2	Non-album single
"OK"	2011	2	Non-album single
"To Refren"	2011	—	Non-album single
"Apopse Den Pame Spiti"	2012	4	Non-album single
"Kinos Paranomastis"	2012	3	Non-album single
"Sbaralia"	2013	—	I Parastasi Arhizi
"Toso Peripou S'agapo"	2013	5	Non-album single
"100 Fores"	2014	—	I Parastasi Arhizi
"Alitis"	2014	—	I Parastasi Arhizi
"Katapliktika"	2015	—	I Parastasi Arhizi
"Kane Me Homa"	2017	66	Non-album single
"Mpam"	2017	36	Non-album single
"Megalos Erotas" (with Thodoris Ferris)	2017	28	Non-album single
"To Mavro Vlemma"	2018	—	Non-album single
"Kryvomai Kato Ap'Ti Vrohi" (with Thanos Papanikolaou)	2018	—	Non-album single
"Paranoia"	2019	2	Non-album single

=== Compilations ===
Year	Title	Label
2007	NINO*NINO*NINO + Eilikrinis	Heaven Music

=== Singles ===
(Not all singles were released on CD)

- 2003: "Sa Navagoi"
- 2003: "Olos O Kosmos"
- 2003: "As Teleiosoume"
- 2003: "Kalimera"
- 2004: "Fovamai"
- 2005: "Gia Na Eimai Eilikrinis"
- 2005: "Sexy"
- 2006: "Erota Mou"
- 2006: "Epireastika"
- 2006: "Pethaino"
- 2006: "Eimai Enas Allos"
- 2007: "Thavmata"
- 2007: "Kako Paidi"
- 2009: "Gia Sena Mono"
- 2010: "Theos"
- 2010: "Christougenna 2010"
- 2011: "14 Flevari"
- 2011: "Ok"
- 2011: "To Refren"

=== Music videos ===
- 2003: "Sa Navagoi"
- 2003: "Olos O Kosmos"
- 2003: "As Teleiosoume"
- 2004: "Fovamai"
- 2005: "Gia Na Eimai Eilikrinis"
- 2005: "Sexy" (MAD Version)
- 2006: "Erota Mou"
- 2006: "Epireastika"
- 2006: "Pethaino"
- 2007: "Thavmata"
- 2007: "Kako Paidi"
- 2010: "Theos"
- 2010: "Christougenna 2010"
- 2011: "14 Flevari"
- 2011: "Ok"
- 2011: "To Refren"
