= Savvato =

Savvato Σάββατο

Studio album by Giorgos Mazonakis
- Released: December 3, 2003
- Recorded: Sierra studio
- Genre: Pop, Modern laika
- Length: 56:48
- Language: Greek
- Label: Heaven Music
- Producer: Phoebus

Giorgos Mazonakis chronology
Kita Me + Beat (2002)	Savvato; Σάββατο (2003)	Live (2004)

Singles from Savvato
- 1. "To Gucci Forema" Released: October 2003; 2. "Savvato" Released: December 2003; 3. "Foveri" Released: February 2004; 4. "Efiges" Released: April 2004; 5. "Tesseris" Released: June 2004

Savvato (Greek: Σάββατο; English: Saturday) is the eighth studio album of the Greek singer Giorgos Mazonakis. It was released on 3 December 2003 by Heaven Music and became gold very soon, but after two months certified platinum, selling over 50,000 units. The album was written entirely by Phoebus who also produced it, and was his second collaboration with Phoebus after the 2 singles on Kita Me + Beat in 2002.

== Track listing ==
All tracks are written by Phoebus.

No.	Title	Length
1.	"To Gucci Forema" (Το Gucci Φόρεμα; The Gucci Dress)	5:19
2.	"Apopse Tha S' Onirefto" (Απόψε Θα Σ' Ονειρευτώ; I'll Dream Of You Tonight)	4:37
3.	"Foveri" (Φοβερή; Awesome)	2:57
4.	"Nikotini" (Νικοτίνη; Nicotine)	3:45
5.	"An De Mporis" (Αν Δε Μπορείς; If You Can't)	3:47
6.	"Pou Na Pao" (Που Να Πάω; Where To Go)	4:24
7.	"Efiges" (Έφυγες; You Left)	4:20
8.	"Prospiese" (Προσποιείσαι; You're Pretending)	3:16
9.	"Tesseris" (Τέσσερις; Four)	4:09
10.	"Savvato" (Σάββατο; Saturday)	3:48
11.	"San Imouna Pedi" (Σαν Ήμουνα Παιδί; As A Child)	4:36
12.	"Etsi Imoun" (Έτσι Ήμουν; Like I Was)	3:50
13.	"Paliozoi" (Παλιοζωή; Badlife)	3:50
14.	"Outro – Foveros"	3:03
Total length:		56:48

== Singles ==
The following singles were officially released to radio stations and gained a lot of airplay:

1. "To Gucci Forema"
2. "Savvato"
3. "Foveri"
4. "Efiges"
5. "Tesseris"

== Credits ==
Credits adapted from liner notes.

=== Personnel ===
- Christina Argyri – backing vocals (2, 3, 4, 7, 8, 11)
- Hakan Bingolou – oud (3) | säz (3, 10)
- Yiannis Bithikotsis – bouzouki, cura (2, 5, 8, 9, 11, 13) | baglama (2, 5, 9, 13)
- Giorgos Chatzopoulos – guitars (2, 5, 11)
- Akis Diximos – backing vocals (7, 9, 10, 11, 12, 13)
- Nektarios Georgiadis – backing vocals (3, 4, 7, 8, 10, 11)
- Antonis Gounaris – guitars (2, 3, 5, 6, 7, 8, 9, 10, 11, 12, 13) | cümbüş (7, 10) | backing vocals (3)
- Anna Ioannidou – backing vocals (2, 5)
- Paola Komini – backing vocals (2, 5)
- Tryfon Koutsourelis – orchestration, programming (2, 3, 5, 6, 7, 8, 9, 10, 11, 12, 13, 14) | keyboards (all tracks)
- Phedon Lionoudakis – accordion (2, 5, 9, 12, 13)
- Alex Panayi – backing vocals (3, 4, 7, 8)
- Phoebus – orchestration (1, 2, 3, 4, 5, 6, 8, 10, 11) | programming, keyboards (1, 4, 6, 8) | backing vocals (3, 14)
- Giorgos Roilos – percussion (3, 8)
- Vaggelis Siapatis – backing vocals (3, 14)
- Giorgos Stabolis – backing vocals (3, 14)
- Thanasis Vasilopoulos – clarinet (3)
- Nikos Zervas – strings, flute (8)
- Martha Zioga – backing vocals (2, 4, 7, 8, 11)

=== Production ===
- Al Giga – styling
- Alex – grooming
- Jonathan Glynn-Smith – photographer
- Giorgos Lyberopoulos – engineer's assistant
- Yiannis Nikolopoulos – engineer's assistant
- Akis Pashalakis – engineer's assistant
- Phoebus – executive producer
- Panayiotis Petronikolos – engineer, mix
- Panos Pitsilidis – art direction
- Vaggelis Siapatis – engineer, editing
- Giorgos Stabolis – production manager

== Charts ==
Savvato made its debut at number 2 on the 'Greece Top 50 Singles' charts and remained for 46 weeks.

After two months, it was certified platinum by IFPI.

Chart	Provider	Peak position	Certification
Greek Singles Chart	IFPI	2	Platinum
