= Sex (Elli Kokkinou album) =

2005 studio album

Studio album by Elli Kokkinou
- Released: November 10, 2005
- Recorded: Power Music studio
- Genres: Pop, Modern laika
- Length: 1:04:26
- Language: Greek
- Label: Heaven Music
- Producer: Phoebus

Elli Kokkinou chronology
Sto Kokkino: Platinum Edition (2004)	Sex (2005)	Ki Allo... Platinum Edition (2006)

Singles from Sex
- 1. "Sex" Released: September 2005; 2. "Talento" Released: November 2005; 3. "Ti Tis Ehis Vri" Released: December 2005; 4. "Erotas Ine" Released: February 2006; 5. "Itan Psema" Released: April 2006

Sex is the fourth studio album by Greek artist Elli Kokkinou. It was released on 10 November 2005 by Heaven Music and soon certified gold certification, selling over 20,000 units. The album was written by Phoebus, with remaining lyrics by Natalia Germanou and Giannis Rentoumis. In September 2006, it became platinum and was re-released, containing 4 new tracks one month later.

== Track listing ==
All music is composed by Phoebus.

No.	Title	Lyrics	Length
1.	"Kalimera" (Καλημέρα; Good Morning)	Phoebus	4:14
2.	"Talento" (Ταλέντο; Talent)	Phoebus	4:43
3.	"Na Me Prosehis" (Να Με Προσέχεις; Take Care Of Me)	Phoebus	4:15
4.	"Sex"	Phoebus	4:42
5.	"Moro Mou SSS (Skase)" (Μωρό Μου ΣΣΣ (Σκάσε); Baby, Shh (Shut Up))	Phoebus	4:22
6.	"Pare Me" (Πάρε Με; Take Me)	Phoebus	5:07
7.	"Ti Tis Ehis Vri" (Τι Της Έχεις Βρει; What Have You Found In Her)	Phoebus	3:49
8.	"Gia Sou" (Γεια Σου; Hey You)	Natalia Germanou	3:39
9.	"Erotevmeni Poli" (Ερωτευμένη Πολύ; In Love A Lot)	Natalia Germanou	3:16
10.	"Itan Psema" (Ήταν Ψέμα; It Was A Lie)	Phoebus	4:22
11.	"Erotas Ine" (Έρωτας Είναι; Love Is)	Giannis Rentoumis	8:22
12.	"Outro"		13:21
Total length:			1:04:26

== Singles ==
- "Sex"
- "Talento" (Talent)
- "Ti Tis Ehis Vri" (What Have You Found In Her)
- "Erotas Ine" (Love Is)
- "Itan Psema" (It Was A Lie)

== Credits ==
Credits adapted from liner notes.

=== Personnel ===
- Yiannis Bithikotsis – bouzouki, cura (tracks 2, 3, 6, 8, 10) ‖ baglama (tracks 2, 3, 6, 8)
- Giorgos Chatzopoulos – guitars (tracks 1, 5, 6, 7, 8, 11)
- Victoria Chalkiti, Alex Panayi – backing vocals (tracks 1, 2, 5, 7, 9)
- Achilleas Diamantis – guitars (tracks 1, 5)
- Akis Diximos – second vocal (tracks 1, 2, 3, 6, 7, 8, 10, 11)
- Nektarios Georgiadis – backing vocals (tracks 5, 7)
- Antonis Gounaris – guitars (tracks 2, 3, 6, 9, 10, 11) ‖ cura (track 7)
- Trifon Koutsourelis – orchestration, programming, keyboards (tracks 1, 2, 3, 5, 6, 7, 8, 9, 10, 11)
- Phedon Lionoudakis – accordion (tracks 2, 6, 10)
- Liana Papalexi – backing vocals (track 9)
- Phoebus – orchestration (all tracks) ‖ programming, keyboards (track 4)
- Giorgos Roilos – percussion (tracks 6, 7)
- Philippos Tseberoulis – flute (tracks 3, 10, 11)

=== Production ===
- Manolis Chiotis – studio photographer
- Giannis Ioannidis (Digital Press Hellas) – mastering
- Konstantinos Kagkas – hair styling
- Giorgos Klaromenos – imagine director
- Vanesa Koutsopodiotou – make up
- Vasilis Nikolopoulos – sound engineer, mix engineer
- Phoebus – executive producer
- Panos Pitsilidis – art direction
- Thodoris Psiachos – cover photographer
- Vaggelis Siapatis – computer editing, sound engineer
- Giorgos Stabolis – production manager
- Aspasia Tsousi – layout
- Manolis Vlachos – mix engineer
- Alexis Valourdos – imagine director

== Charts ==
Sex made its debut at number 2 on the 'Top 50 Greek Albums' charts by IFPI.

In a month, it was certified gold according to sales.

Chart	Provider	Peak position	# Weeks	Certification
Top 50 Greek Albums	IFPI	2	32	Gold

== Ki Allo... Platinum Edition ==
Ki Allo... Platinum Edition Κι Άλλο... Platinum Edition

Studio album by Elli Kokkinou
- Released: October 5, 2006
- Recorded: Power Music studio
- Genre: Modern laika
- Length: 1:07:26
- Language: Greek
- Label: Heaven Music
- Producer: Phoebus

Elli Kokkinou chronology
Sex (2005)	Ki Allo... Platinum Edition; Κι Άλλο... Platinum Edition (2006)	Eilikrina (2007)

Singles from Sex
- 1. "Sex [French version]" Released: October 2006; 2. "Ki Allo" Released: November 2006; 3. "Adiaforos" Released: December 2006

Ki Allo... Platinum Edition (Greek: Κι Άλλο...; English: More...) is the re-release of fourth studio album Sex by Greek artist Elli Kokkinou. It was released on 5 October 2006 by Heaven Music, selling other 20,000 units. Following recent tactics, the album was re-released with four new songs, in one of them featuring Thanos Petrelis. It also includes a DVD with music videos, photos, and interviews.

== Track listing ==
All music is composed by Phoebus.

No.	Title	Lyrics	Length
1.	"Magiko Filtro" (Μαγικό Φίλτρο; Magic Potion)	Phoebus	4:44
2.	"Ki Allo" (Κι Άλλο; More)	Phoebus	4:04
3.	"Adiaforos (ft. Thanos Petrelis)" (Αδιάφορος; Uninterested)	Phoebus	3:15
4.	"Sex [French version]"	Markella Panagiotou	4:42
5.	"Kalimera"	Phoebus	4:14
6.	"Talento"	Phoebus	4:43
7.	"Na Me Prosehis"	Phoebus	4:15
8.	"Sex"	Phoebus	4:42
9.	"Moro Mou SSS (Skase)"	Phoebus	4:22
10.	"Pare Me"	Phoebus	5:07
11.	"Ti Tis Ehis Vri"	Phoebus	3:49
12.	"Gia Sou"	Natalia Germanou	3:39
13.	"Erotevmeni Poli"	Natalia Germanou	3:16
14.	"Itan Psema"	Phoebus	4:22
15.	"Erotas Ine"	Giannis Rentoumis	8:22
Total length:			1:07:26

== DVD ==
DVD contains the video clips of following songs:

1. "Sex"
2. "Ti Tis Ehis Vri"
3. "Itan Psema"
4. «Making of» photos
5. Gold certification of Sex
6. "Sex" (French version) from Mad Video Awards 2006
7. Interview with Makis Pounentis

== Singles ==
- "Sex [French version]"
- "Ki Allo" (More)
- "Adiaforos" (Uninterested)

== Credits ==
Credits adapted from liner notes.

=== Personnel ===
- Hakan Bingolou – oud, säz (track 4)
- Yiannis Bithikotsis – bouzouki, baglama (tracks 1, 3) ‖ cura (track 1) ‖ lute (track 2)
- Victoria Chalkiti, Alex Panayi – backing vocals (track 1)
- Giorgos Chatzopoulos – guitars (tracks 1, 2, 3)
- Akis Diximos – backing vocals, second vocal (tracks 2, 3)
- Trifon Koutsourelis – orchestration, programming, keyboards (tracks 1, 2, 3)
- Phoebus – orchestration (all tracks) ‖ programming, keyboards (track 4)
- Giorgos Roilos – percussion (tracks 1, 2, 3)
- Thanasis Vasilopoulos – clarinet, ney (track 4)

=== Production ===
- Antonis Aspromourgos – processing
- Manolis Chiotis – studio photographer
- Konstantinos Kagkas – hair styling
- Giorgos Klaromenos – imagine director
- Vanesa Koutsopodiotou – make up
- Vasilis Nikolopoulos – sound engineer, mix engineer
- Elsa Patsadeli – styling
- Phoebus – executive producer
- Panos Pitsilidis – art direction
- Roula Revi – cover photographer
- Vaggelis Siapatis – computer editing, sound engineer
- Giorgos Stabolis – production manager
- Aspasia Tsousi – layout
- Alexis Valourdos – imagine director
- Leon Zervos – mastering

== Charts ==
Ki Allo... Platinum Edition made its debut at number 1 on the 'Top 50 Greek Albums' charts by IFPI.

With its release, it was certified platinum according to sales.

Chart	Provider	Peak position	# Weeks	Certification
Top 50 Greek Albums	IFPI	1	12	Platinum
