= Eilikrina =

Eilikrina (Greek: Ειλικρινά, English: Sincerely) may refer to:

== Music ==
=== Albums ===
- Eilikrina (Elli Kokkinou album), 2007 album by Greek singer Elli Kokkinou.
- Eilikrina (Nikos Oikonomopoulos album), 2013 album by Greek singer Nikos Oikonomopoulos.
