= Ta Genethlia Mou =

Studio album by Elli Kokkinou
- Released: 9 December 2011
- Recorded: 2010–2011; Power Music Studios
- Genre: Contemporary laïkó, Pop
- Length: 57:47
- Label: The Spicy Effect
- Producer: Phoebus

Elli Kokkinou chronology
Eilikrina (2007)	Ta Genethlia Mou (2011)

Singles from Ta Genethlia Mou
- 1. "Ontos" Released: 22 January 2010; 2. "Apohoro" Released: 30 April 2010; 3. "Den Tin Palevo (feat. Vasilis Karras)" Released: 19 October 2010; 4. "Eroteftika" Released: 25 February 2011; 5. "Genethlia" Released: 21 June 2011; 6. "Apisteftos" Released: 24 October 2011; 7. "Kitaxe Gyro Mas" Released: 14 January 2012

Ta Genethlia Mou (Greek: Τα Γενέθλια Μου; English: My Birthday) is the sixth studio album by Greek singer Elli Kokkinou, released in Greece and Cyprus on 9 December 2011 by The Spicy Effect. It marks her first studio album released under the label and under her renewed collaboration with songwriter and producer Phoebus. It also marks her first studio album in four years since Eilikrina (2007). The album has fifteen songs in total, including two duets and four remixes.

== Production ==
Phoebus composed all of the songs on the album, as well as writing lyrics for twelve songs. Among the other lyricist are Vaggelis Konstantinidis on two songs and Zoi Gripari on one song.

== Release ==
The release of Ta Genethlia Mou marks Elli Kokkinou's sixth studio album. Released on 9 December 2011 in Greece and Cyprus, it is Kokkinou's first album under her signing with The Spicy Effect, as well as her first album after her renewed collaboration with Phoebus. The album was released as a Deluxe Digipak featuring a booklet. For its first week of release, the CD was bundled with the magazine Tiletheatis.89.9 Dromos FM is the main sponsor of the album, with its logo appearing on the album cover of the retail release.

For promotion of the album, Kokkinou collaborated with singers Despina Vandi and Nikos Oikonomopoulos for a concert series at club Fever for the 2011–2012 winter season. A television advertisement also accompanied the album's release.

== Track listing ==
No.	Title	Lyrics	Music	Length
1.	"Genethlia" (Γενέθλια; Birthday)	Phoebus	Phoebus	3:54
2.	"Eroteftika" (Ερωτεύτηκα; I fell in love)	Phoebus	Phoebus	4:21
3.	"Apisteftos" (Απίστευτος; Unbelievable)	Phoebus	Phoebus	3:33
4.	"Kitaxe Giro Mas" (Κοιτάξτε Γύρω Μας; Look around us)	Vaggelis Konstantinidis	Phoebus	4:06
5.	"Apohoro" (Αποχωρώ; I depart)	Phoebus	Phoebus	4:09
6.	"Den Iparheis Pia" (Δεν Υπάρχεις Πια; You don't exist anymore)	Phoebus	Phoebus	3:45
7.	"Etsi Se Dehtika" (Έτσι Σε Δέχτηκα; That's how I accepted you)	Vaggelis Konstandinidis	Phoebus	3:56
8.	"Ftaiei I Nihta" (Φταίει Η Νύχτα; It's the night's fault)	Phoebus	Phoebus	4:33
9.	"Tha 'Sai Opou Eimai" (Θα 'Σαι Οπου Είμαι; You will be wherever I am)	Zoi Gripari	Phoebus	3:38
10.	"Den Tin Palevo (feat. Vasilis Karras)" (Δεν Την Παλεύω; I can't fight it)	Phoebus	Phoebus	3:40
11.	"Ontos (feat. Ipohthonios)" (Όντως; In fact)	Phoebus	Phoebus	3:53
12.	"Ontos (Remix)" (Όντως; In fact)	Phoebus	Phoebus	4:13
13.	"Eroteftika (Remix)" (Ερωτεύτηκα; I fell in love)	Phoebus	Phoebus	3:50
14.	"Den Tin Palevo (Remix)" (Δεν Την Παλεύω; I can't fight it)	Phoebus	Phoebus	2:58
15.	"Genethlia (Remix)" (Γενέθλια; Birthday)	Phoebus	Phoebus	3:18

== Singles ==
"Ontos"

"Ontos" (in fact) is the first single from the album, released on 22 January 2010 shortly after Kokkinou signed to The Spicy Effect. The song features rapper and label mate Ipohthonios. A music video also debuted, while a digital download was released on 27 April 2010. Kokkinou performed a remix of the song live during her appearance on the first season of Greek Idol on 10 May 2010, with the remix later being released digitally on 21 May 2010.

"Apohoro

"Apohoro" (I depart) is the second single from the album, released in mid April 2010, with its digital release on 30 April 2010. A music video was later released.

"Den Tin Palevo"

"Den Tin Palevo" (I can't fight it) is the third single from the album and was released on 19 October 2010. The song features Vasilis Karras, with whom Kokkinou also collaborated with for her 2010–2011 winter concert series. It was digitally released on 9 November 2010, with a remix also being released later.

"Eroteftika"

"Eroteftika" (I fell in love) is the fourth single from the album, released on 25 February 2011. "Eroteftika" was digital release was on 8 March 2011, while a music video directed by Kostas Kapetanidis was released on 23 March 2011. A remix was also later released on 13 April 2011. The song charted at number 32 on the year-end Greek Airplay Chart.

"Genethlia"

"Genethlia" (Birthday) is the fifth single from the album and was released on 21 June 2011 under the title "Ta Genethlia Mou" (My birthday). A remix of the song was released on 22 July 2011. "Ta Genethlia Mou" was digitally released on 4 August 2011. A music video directed by Konstantinos Rigos was released on 12 August 2011.

"Apisteftos"

"Apisteftos" (unbelievable) is the sixth radio single from the album, released on 24 October 2011. "Apisteftos" was released digitally on 11 November 2011.

"Kitaxe Gyro Mas"

"Kitaxe Gyro Mas" (look around us) is the seventh and final radio single from the album, released on 14 January 2012.

== Personnel ==
- Phoebus – Executive producer, arrangement, programing, mixing, keyboards, acoustic guitar, twelve-string guitar, electric guitar
- Antonis Gounaris – Arrangement, programming, keyboards, bouzouki, tzouras, baglamas, ukulele, CUBUS, acoustic guitar, twelve-string guitar, electric guitar,
- Vaggelis Siapatis – Production organizer, Sound-audio editing, computer editing
- Vasilis Nikolopoulos – Arrangement, programing, mixing, keyboards, drums (at Sierra Studios)
- Giorgos Hatzopoulos – acoustic guitar, twelve-string guitar, electric guitar
- Paul Stefanidis – Mastering (at Viking Lounge Mastering Studio in Sydney)
- Thodoris Chrisanthopoulos (Fabel Sound) – Mastering
- Dimitris Antoniadis – Drums
- Giorgos Kostoulou – Bass guitar
- Giorgos Roilos – Percussion instrument
- Stavros Papagiannaikopoulos – Bouzouki, tzouras, baglamas
- Stella Valasi – Santouri
- Roula Revi – Photography
- Vasilis Kalegias – Photographic assistant
- Dimitris Rekouniotis (Led Creative) – Art direction
- Nikolas Villiotis – Hairstyling
- Vanessa Koustopodiotou – Make up
- Chrisanthi Thomatou – Styling
- Anna Tzaferi – Vocals
- Simela Christopoulou – Vocals
- Christina Miliou – Vocals
- Athina Velissari – Vocals
- Victoria Halkita – Vocals
- Akis Dieximos – Background vocals

== Release history ==
Region	Date	Label	Format
Greece	9 December 2011	The Spicy Effect	CD
Cyprus	9 December 2011	The Spicy Effect	CD
