= Nino (Greek singer) =

Greek singer (born 1981)

Nino Νίνο
- Born: Stefanos Sakellarios Xypolitas; 29 June 1981 (age 45); Stockholm, Sweden
- Origin: Greece
- Occupations: Singer, songwriter
- Years active: 2002–present
- Labels: Heaven Music (2004–2009)(2023-today); The Spicy Effect (2009–2013); Cobalt Music (2013–2017); Panik Records (2017–2022)
- Spouse: Chrysí Vardinoyannis (m. 2012; div. 2017)

Stefanos Xypolitas (Greek: Στέφανος Ξυπολητάς, pronounced [ˈstefanos ksipoliˈtas]), known professionally as Nino (Greek: Νίνο [ˈnino]), is a Greek singer. He rose to fame in 2003 after appearing as a contestant on the debut season of the television show Fame Story. He has since released five studio albums.

== Biography ==
=== Early life ===
Nino was born Stefanos Sakellarios Xypolitas in Stockholm, Sweden, on 29 June 1981, and shortly after moved with his family to Rhodes, Greece. His first experience with music was at age three, when his parents gave him a piano as a gift. At a young age Nino wrote his first song, titled "Eisai To Pio Omorfo Pou Iparhi" ("You are the most beautiful that exists"), dedicated to his mother. He learned to play the harmonium, guitar (electric classical), drums, harmonica, accordion, and bass by the age of 16. His first real performance was at age 15 live at a night club, where he gained impressions. He started to take music seriously at the age 16. After school, Nino moved to Athens to pursue a music career, where he attended various auditions, while attending college for sound designing at the same time. Shortly after, Nino accepted to perform at a large night club back in Rhodes, and moved back. After a successful concert-series, Nino then went on and performed in Patras.

=== Personal life ===
Ιn May 2007, Nino was a victim of an armed attack. Two strangers riding on a motorcycle "squeezed" his car in an attempt to stop him on a road in Thessaloniki. Neither himself nor his brother, who was also in the car, were injured.

From 2008 to 2010, Nino dated Doukissa Nomikou. He then dated Chrysí Vardinoyannis whom he married in 2012, having two children: George Skeyos (born 2013) and Karen Agapi (born 2014). Their marriage ended in August 2017.

== Career ==
=== 2002–2003: Fame Story era ===
After a few years of performing at small venues, Nino decided to audition for the first season of "Fame Story".

=== 2004: After Fame Story and debut album ===
After being eliminated from "Fame Story", he received offers from various Greek labels acting as second optionners, as he was bound to sign to Heaven Music, the record company that had the management rights on the players of the game, and which a subsidiary of Ant-1 TV, airing Fame story. During the winter season of 2003–04, Nino appeared alongside Anna Vissi, Konstantinos Christoforou, and Hi-5 for a series of concert at club "Diogenis Studio". Follow those appearances, in early 2004, he appeared alongside Apostolia Zoi, Elena Paparizou, and Thanos Petrelis in a series of concerts at club Thalassa.

In July 2004, Nino released his debut album titled Nino, Nino, Nino. The album contained 13 songs, mostly love ballads, along with songs containing folk and pop elements. The music for seven of the songs wewasenned by the then up-and-coming composer Kyriakos Papadopoulos. Additional music was penned by Christoforos Germenis and Takis Damaschis while two songs from the album were also penned by Grigoris Petrakos, a fellow gamer from "Fame Story". The lyrics were written by Vasilis Yiannopoulos, while Natalia Germanou wrote the lyrics for the song "Horis Na Se Ksero" ("Without knowing you"). The album debuted at No. 1 on Greek Album Chart and after 3 weeks was certified gold selling more than 20,000 copies. The album spawned many airplay hits such as "Kalimera", "Sa Navagoi", "As Telionoume", etc. After three months the album reached platinum status. Reception of the album was generally well perceived, while a magazine wrote "The El Nino phenomenon has just reached". For the winter season that followed, Nino appeared alongside Peggy Zina and Kostas Karafotis (another player within fame Story) for a series of concerts at the Apollon Club in Athens.

=== 2005–2006: Eilikrinis and Epireastika ===
During the first half of 2005, Nino accompanied Peggy Zina for part of her world tour to Australia and the United Kingdom. Following the success of his debut album, Nino started working on his second album. Nino returned in November 2005 with a more mature sounding album titled Ilikrinis (Honest), containing 15 songs. The album featured more laika than his previous album. The first single from the album was "Fovamai" (I'm Scared), which gained substantial airplay. "Gia Na Eimai Ilikrinis" (To be honest) and "Sexy" were further released as radio singles. The album was certified gold. In March 2006, Nino released his third studio album Epireastika (Influenced), which included 11 songs. The cover of the album depicted Nino as a statue after special treatment, while it was notable for differing from traditional album covers that the Greek audience was accustomed to until that point. Stamatis Gonidis wrote two more songs, and they collaborated successfully for a series of concerts all winter long at club "Thalassa". The first single "Erota Mou" (My love) was a radio hit, while the music video was criticized for being too explicit.

In September 2006, Nino accompanied Natassa Theodoridou on tour to the United States and Canada. For promotion of the album, Nino appeared alongside Elena Paparizou and Pashalis Terzis for a series of concerts at the Iera Odos Club in Athens during the winter season. Following those appearances, the show moved to club "Odeon" in Thessaloniki during the first half of 2007.

=== 2007–present: Thavmata and I Parastasi Arxizei ===
In May 2007, Nino and his brother were attacked near Thessaloniki's airport, while returning to their hotel after his live appearance at a local club. Two people on a motorcycle shot their car with seventeen bullets fired from a Kalashnikov gun. No one was injured. The motorcycle driver and another passenger approached the car and began to shoot. The driver and the accompanying motorcycle then disappeared while police found seven bullet casings in the area.

A year and a half after the release of his third album, Nino released his fourth one titled Thavmata (Miracles) on 29 October 2007. Many well-known composers and lyricists collaborated again with Nino on the album. Nino had a hand in writing many of the songs. The first single was "Thavmata", which received some success on the radio. On 31 October 2007, Nino appeared with Elena Paparizou for a concert in Cyprus's Eleftheria Stadium.

During the first half of 2008, Nino appeared alongside Chrispa and Andreas Stamos at Thalassa Club in Athens for the promotion of his album. During the winter season, Nino reunited with Peggy Zina and Kostas Karafotis for a series of concerts at VOX Club, Athens.

At the start of 2009, Nino took a break from music to complete his compulsory military service in the Hellenic Army in Rhodes, which he completed in January 2010. Nino took a Leave of absence in June 2009 and performed a cover of the song "I Kissed a Girl" with the band Kokkina Hallia at the 2009 MAD Video Music Awards.

Nino's fifth studio album, I Parastasi Arhizei (The show begins), although recorded in 2008 was finally released on 22 November 2009. The album, originally planned to be released in October 2008, was delayed due to a rift created between Nino and Heaven Music after his unwillingness to renew his contract with the label. Nino's contract with the label ended in November 2009, forcing the label to grudgingly release the album as stipulated under their contract. The album, which contains 11 songs, was released via Espresso newspaper Sunday issue, as a premium give-away. The album was released with no promotion, and will not be re-issued by the company. Thus, it is "limited edition".

On 11 December 2009, Nino signed a five-year contract with Greek songwriter Phoebus's record label, called The Spicy Effect, the same day Elli Kokkinou was signed. He previously collaborated with Phoebus for a song on Elli Kokkinou's album, "Sto Kokkino".

On 14 May 2010, Nino released his first digital-only single, titled "Theos" (God), promoted in exclusivity on affiliated radio station Dromos FM. He performed the song live, for the first time, on 19 May 2010 at the Playmate 2010 beauty contest aired by affiliated TV station Star Channel . The song was released the next day as a music download on 20 May 2010. A second single titled "14 Flevari" (14 February) followed on 27 January 2010. and was available, physically, only a few days at Valentine's week, within a "Love" postal card. During the summer of 2011, Phoebus produced a new digital-single titled "OK". All three Spicy digital releases were issued at the end of 2011, in a compilation titled "The Spicy Collection, vol 1", along with other digital releases.

== Discography ==
- 2003: Nino Nino Nino
- 2004: Eilikrinis
- 2006: Epireastika
- 2007: Thavmata
- 2008: I Parastasi Arxizei
- 2015: Erhetai I Nihta
