= Greek Idol season 2 =

Greek Idol
- Season 2
- Hosted by: Roula Koromila
- Judges: Petros Kostopoulos; Elli Kokkinou; Kostas Kapetanidis
- Winner: Panagiotis Tsakalakos
- Runner-up: Malou Kiriakopoulou

Release
- Original network: Alpha TV
- Original release: 19 February – 25 June 2011

Season chronology
- ← Previous; Season 1

The second season of Greek Idol premiered on 19 February 2011 and concluded on 25 June 2011, on Alpha TV.

== Changes ==
=== Judges ===
Following the end of season one, Dimitris Kontopoulos and Maro Theodoraki announced they would not reprise their roles as judges for the second season. Kontopoulos came to the decision to walk away from the show citing the need for more time to focus on his work and music. Maro Theodraki announced she would not return as well, citing scheduling issues with her work, while mentioning that the decision was mutual with Alpha TV.

Following Kontopoulos and Theodoraki's departures, Alpha TV began actively seeking replacements. In September 2010, singer Elena Paparizou confirmed that Alpha TV had asked her to be a judge for season two, although she declined the offer saying she is still too young to judge her peers. In October 2010, it was reported that singer Elli Kokkinou agreed to be a judge for the second season. Alpha TV later announced on October 26, 2010 that the judges for the second season would be three instead of four, and would consist of Elli Kokkinou, Petros Kostopoulos, and Kostas Kapetanidis.

=== Hosts ===
Following the conclusion of season 1, Anta Livitsanou announced she would not return for the second installment. Roula Koromila was returned to host season 2.

== Way to the Top 15 ==
=== Auditions ===
In order to audition for Greek Idol, participants must have been between 16 and 32 years old. Auditions began in Nicosia, Cyprus in November 2010, and continued in Athens and Katerini, Greece. More than 5,000 people auditioned for the second season.

=== Recall ===
Judges chose 100 participants out of those who auditioned. At the recall rounds, the top 100 were narrowed down to the top 15 in three stages. During the first round, contestants were required to sing a song of their choice a cappella, with their fate being determined instantly in a sudden death scenario, narrowing down contestants to sixty. In the second round, contestants were required to forms groups, and were then assigned a song to sing in front of judges; their fates were revealed at the end of all performances, when they were split up into three rooms and learned their fates narrowing them down to thirty. In the third round, contestants were required to pick a song out of nineteen available, and perform it solo accompanied by a piano. Only six contestants could choose a specific song before it was taken off the list. After all performances, the judges narrowed them down to the top 15 which will perform in the live Greek Idol shows.

== Live shows ==
=== Top 15 – Contestant's Favorite ===
Each contestant had to sing their favorite song, and were narrowed down to ten. Seven contestants passed to the next round by viewer votes, while judges could save three more contestants. The guest performer for this episode was Peggy Zina.

Order	Contestant	Song	Result
1	Dimitris Tiktopoulos	"It's My Life"	Safe
2	Katerina Morena	"To Fos Stin Psihi"	Eliminated
3	Giorgos Xilouris	"Eiani Stigmes"	Safe
4	Marianna Malantzi	"Rolling in the Deep"	Eliminated
5	Chrisanthos Kanteres	"Soma Me Soma"	Eliminated
6	Keren Tamami	"So What"	Safe
7	Maria Theodotou	"Kardia Mou Ego!"	Safe
8	Konstantinos Frantzis	"Wicked Game"	Safe
9	Erofili Tzanou	"Mia Kokkini Grammi"	Safe
10	Katerina Koukouraki	"Russian Roulette"	Safe
11	Christos Tsoumanis	"Rock 'N' Roll Sto Krevati"	Eliminated
12	Aris Plaskassovitis	"Light My Fire"	Safe
13	Chrisa Bandeli	"O Aggelos Mou"	Eliminated
14	Panagiotis Tsakalakos	"Sex On Fire"	Safe
15	Malou Kiriakopoulou	"Je Veux"	Safe

- Group performance: Jennifer Lopez featuring Pitbull "On the Floor"

=== Top 10 – Love Songs ===
Each contestant had to sing a popular love song of their choice. The guest performers for this episode were Professional Sinnerz, Shaya featuring Mark F. Angelo, and Dimos Anastasiadis.

Order	Contestant	Song	Result
1	Katerina Koukouraki	"Mazi Sou"	Safe
2	Aris Plaskassovitis	"Just the Way You Are"	Safe
3	Erofili Tzanou	"Pali Tha Klapso"	Safe
4	Panagiotis Tsakalakos	"Ma Den Teliosame"	Safe
5	Keren Tamami	"Holding Out for a Hero"	Bottom Three
6	Maria Theodotou	"Den Eisai Edo"	Safe
7	Giorgos Xilouris	"Mou Heis Kani Ti Zoi Mou Kolasi"	Bottom Two
8	Malou Kiriakopoulou	"Mad About You"	Safe
9	Konstantinos Frantzis	"Parafora"	Eliminated
10	Dimitris Tiktopoulos	"I Don't Want to Miss a Thing"	Safe

=== Top 9 – Today's Hits ===
Each contestant had to sing a recently released song.

Order	Contestant	Song	Result
1	Keren Tamami	"Oti Aksizei"	Safe
2	Katerina Koukouraki	"Far from Everything"	Eliminated
3	Aris Plaskassovitis	"Makria (Gia Oso Zo)"	Bottom Three
4	Dimitris Tiktopoulos	"Mia Apo Ta Idia"	Safe
5	Maria Theodotou	"Baby It's Over"	Bottom Two
6	Giorgos Xilouris	"Kleista Ta Stomata"	Safe
7	Malou Kiriakopoulou	"Fila Me Akoma (Baciami ancora)"	Safe
8	Erofili Tsanou	"Rotisa"	Safe
9	Panagiotis Tsakalakos	"Fuckin' Perfect"	Safe

- Group performance: Britney Spears "Hold It Against Me"

=== Top 8 – My Idol ===
Each contestant had to sing a song by their Idol.

Order	Contestant	Song	Result
1	Panagiotis Tsakalakos	"Roxanne"	Bottom Two
2	Erofili Tsanou	"Kaka Paidia"	Bottom Three
3	Maria Theodotou	"Sinavlia"	Safe
4	Aris Plaskassovitis	"Fly Me to the Moon"	Safe
5	Dimitris Tiktopoulos	"Kapoios S'Agapai"	Eliminated
6	Malou Kiriakopoulou	"Esy De Zeis Pouthena"	Safe
7	Keren Tamami	"The Best"	Bottom Four
8	Giorgos Xilouris	"Theos"	Safe

- Group performance: Sakis Rouvas "Oi Dio Mas"

=== Top 7 – Hits of 2000-2010 ===
The contestants were supported by a live band for the first time and they each had to sing a song in Greek and English.

Order	Contestant	Song	Result
1	Malou Kiriakopoulou	"Ola Afta Pou Fovamai"	Bottom Two
2	Giorgos Xilouris	"Mi Svinis Ta Fota"	Safe
3	Keren Tamami	"Tha Mai Allios"	Eliminated
4	Maria Theodotou	"Trexe"	Safe
5	Panagiotis Tsakalakos	"Den Zitao Polla"	Safe
6	Erofili Tsanou	"Den Thelo"	Bottom Three
7	Aris Plaskassovitis	"Diskolos Keros Gia Pringipes"	Safe
8	Malou Kiriakopoulou	"This Love"	Bottom Two
9	Giorgos Xilouris	"Pictures of You"	Safe
10	Keren Tamami	"One Day in Your Life"	Eliminated
11	Maria Theodotou	"No One"	Safe
12	Panagiotis Tsakalakos	"Vertigo"	Safe
13	Erofili Tsanou	"The Unforgiven"	Bottom Three
14	Aris Plaskassovitis	"Getting Away With It (All Messed Up)"	Safe

- Group performance: Onirama featuring Helena Paparizou "Fisika Mazi (Together Forever)"

=== Top 6 – Judges Choice ===
The songs were chosen by the judges and the contestants each had to sing a song in Greek and English.

Order	Contestant	Song	Result
1	Erofili Tsanou	"Fotia Sta Savvotvradia"	Eliminated
2	Panagiotis Tsakalakos	"Flasaki"	Safe
3	Aris Plaskassovitis	"Tonight (I'm Lovin' You)"	Safe
4	Malou Kiriakopoulou	"I Agapi Argei"	Safe
5	Giorgos Xilouris	"Losing My Religion"	Safe
6	Maria Theodotou	"First Be a Woman"	Bottom Two
7	Erofili Tsanou	"Give It to Me Right"	Eliminated
8	Panagiotis Tsakalakos	"Papa Was a Rollin' Stone"	Safe
9	Aris Plaskassovitis	"Ta Isiha Vradia"	Safe
10	Malou Kiriakopoulou	"A Night Like This"	Safe
11	Giorgos Xilouris	"Anapoda"	Safe
12	Maria Theodotou	"Adoni"	Bottom Two

- Group performance: Kings of Leon "Use Somebody"

=== Top 5 – Greek Hits & Dedications ===
Each contestant had to sing a Greek hit as well dedicate another song to a loved one.

Order	Contestant	Song	Result
1	Malou Kiriakopoulou	"Se Opion Aresoume"	Safe
2	Panagiotis Tsakalakos	"Kalokairines Diakopes"	Bottom Two
3	Giorgos Xilouris	"Aniko Se Mena"	Safe
4	Maria Theodotou	"Thelo Konta Sou Na Meino"	Safe
5	Aris Plaskassovitis	"To Kalitero Psema"	Eliminated
6	Malou Kiriakopoulou	"Don't Speak"	Safe
7	Panagiotis Tsakalakos	"Great Balls of Fire"	Bottom Two
8	Giorgos Xilouris	"Doro Gia Sena"	Safe
9	Maria Theodotou	"Theos An Einai"	Safe
10	Aris Plaskassovitis	"All Right Now"	Eliminated

- Group performance: Taio Cruz featuring Kylie Minogue "Higher"

=== Top 4 – International Hits Remixed & Celebrity Duets ===
Each contestant had to sing a remixed version of a big international Hit-Song and secondly a duet with a Greek Performer.

Order	Contestant	Song	Result
1	Maria Theodotou	"It's My Life"	Safe
2	Giorgos Xilouris	"Smells Like Teen Spirit"	Eliminated
3	Panagiotis Tsakalakos	"Hotel California"	Bottom Two
4	Malou Kiriakopoulou	"Like a Prayer"	Safe
5	Maria Theodotou	"Esy Pou Agapousa Tosa" (Duet with Manos Pirovolakis)	Safe
6	Giorgos Xilouris	"Oikogeniaki Ipothesi" (Duet with Giannis Vardis)	Eliminated
7	Panagiotis Tsakalakos	"O Paradeisos Den Ftiahtike Gia Mas" (Duet with Despina Olimbiou)	Bottom Two
8	Malou Kiriakopoulou	"Easy Lover" (Duet with Pinelopi Anastasopoulou & the Mamcitas)	Safe

- Group performance: Lady Gaga "The Edge of Glory"

=== Top 3 – Midtempo, Ballads & Auditions ===
Each contestant had to sing 3 songs, of which one was a ballad, the other a Midtempo song and finally their first audition song on the show.

Order	Contestant	Song	Result
1	Malou Kiriakopoulou	"La Camisa Negra"	Safe
2	Panagiotis Tsakalakos	"Bed of Roses"	Safe
3	Maria Theodotou	"Get the Party Started"	Eliminated
4	Malou Kiriakopoulou	"Ego Den Eimai Poiitis"	Safe
5	Panagiotis Tsakalakos	"Tha Mas Poune Kai Malakes"	Safe
6	Maria Theodotou	"Lipame Eilikrina"	Eliminated
7	Malou Kiriakopoulou	"Amor Perfecto"	Safe
8	Panagiotis Tsakalakos	"You're the One That I Want"	Safe
9	Maria Theodotou	"Trava Skandali"	Eliminated

- Group performance: Elli Kokkinou "Avto To Kalokairi"; Elli Kokkinou "Itan Psema"

=== Top 2 – Finale ===
Order	Contestant	Song	Result
1	Malou Kiriakopoulou	"Je Veux"	Runner-up
2	Panagiotis Tsakalakos	"Fuckin' Perfect"	Winner
3	Malou Kiriakopoulou	"Rok Ballanda" (Duet with Andonis Vardis)	Runner-up
4	Panagiotis Tsakalakos	"Tha Ekrago" (Duet with Andonis Vardis)	Winner
5	Malou Kiriakopoulou	"Poli Mou Paei"	Runner-up
6	Panagiotis Tsakalakos	"Poli Mou Paei"	Winner

== Elimination chart ==
Legend
Female	Male	Top 15	Top 10	Winner

Safe	Safe First	Safe Last	Eliminated

Stage:		Top 15	Finals								
Week:		4/16	4/25	4/30	5/7	5/21	5/28	6/4	6/11	6/18	6/25
Place	Contestant	Result									
1	Panagiotis Tsakalakos	Viewers			Btm 2			Btm 2	Btm 2		53,8%
2	Malou Kiriakopoulou	Viewers				Btm 2					46,2%
3	Maria Theodotou	Viewers		Btm 2			Btm 2			Elim	
4	Giorgos Xilouris	Viewers	Btm 2						Elim		
5	Aris Plaskassovitis	Viewers		Btm 3				Elim			
6	Erofili Tzanou	Judges			Btm 3	Btm 3	Elim				
7	Keren Tamami	Judges	Btm 3		Btm 4	Elim					
8	Dimitris Tiktopoulos	Viewers			Elim						
9	Katerina Koukouraki	Viewers		Elim							
10	Konstantinos Frantzis	Judges	Elim								
11-15	Marianna Malantzi	Elim									
11-15	Chrisa Bandeli	Elim									
11-15	Katerina Morena	Elim									
11-15	Chrisanthos Kanteres	Elim									
11-15	Christos Tsoumanis	Elim									
