= Sineidisi =

Sineidisi Συνείδηση

Studio album by Dimitris Kokotas
- Released: 1995
- Recorded: 1995, Studio Sierra
- Genre: contemporary laïka
- Language: Greek
- Label: Eros Music
- Producer: Phoebus

Sineidisi (Greek: Συνείδηση; English: Consciousness) is the second studio album by Greek singer Dimitris Kokotas. It was released in Greece in 1995 by EROS Music. It reached 1× platinum status. This is the second collaboration of Dimitris Kokotas with songwriter Phoebus.

== Track listing ==
1. "Liono" - 4:58
2. "Giati me tyrannas" - 3:58
3. "Poli kali gia na sai alithini" - 4:26
4. "Ki ase na lene" - 4:50
5. "S'ena tilefonima" - 3:32
6. "Sineidisi" - 3:54
7. "Anemona" - 4:39
8. "Poso mou leipsan" - 3:53
9. "M'anisiheis" - 3:37
10. "Kathe fora pou me ksehnas" - 4:18

All the lyrics and music: Phoebus

== Credits and personnel ==
Personnel

- Phoebus- Music, Lyrics, orchestration, programming
- Giorgos Roilos-Percussion
- Giannis Bithikotsis- baglama, bouzouki, tzoura, mandolino
- Antonis Gounaris- Guitars, cumbus
- Maria Reboutsika-violin
- Dimitris Kokotas-vocals, second vocals, background vocals
- Odysseas Korelis-violin
- Ploutarhos Reboutsikas-cello
- Dimitris Zouboulis-violin
- Eva Tselidou, Vanessa Karageorgou-background vocals
- Nikos Chatzopoulos-violin

Production

- Phoebus- producer
- Panagiotis Petronikolos - sound, mixing
- Vaggelis Papadopoulos, Antonis Papathanasiou - sound

Credits adapted from the album's liner notes.
