= Eilikrina (Elli Kokkinou album) =

Ilikrina Ειλικρινά

Studio album by Elli Kokkinou
- Released: 22 October 2007
- Recorded: Vox Studio
- Genre: Pop, Contemporary Laika
- Length: 41:39
- Language: Greek
- Label: Sony BMG Greece; Columbia

Elli Kokkinou chronology
| Ki Allo... Platinum Edition (2006) | Ilikrina; Ειλικρινά (2007) | Ta Genethlia Mou (2011) |

Singles from Eilikrina
- 1. "Lipame Ilikrina" Released: October 2007; 2. "Ise Oti Thelo" Released: February 2008; 3. "Pes Mou Ena Psema" Released: April 2008; 4. "De Pao Kala" Released: June 2008

Ilikrina (Greek: Ειλικρινά; English: Truly) is the fifth studio album by Greek artist, Elli Kokkinou. It was released on 22 October 2007 by Sony BMG Greece and certified gold certification, selling 15,000 units, and return to Sony BMG Music from Heaven Music. The album was written by various artists, mainly by Tasos Panagis, and her lead single "Lipame Ilikrina" peaked at number 2 on the Nielsen's Greece Radio Airplay chart.

== Track listing ==
| No. | Title | Lyrics | Music | Length |
|---|---|---|---|---|
| 1. | "Ise Oti Thelo" (Είσαι Ότι Θέλω; You're That I Want) | Vicky Gerothodorou | Dimitris Kontopoulos | 3:15 |
| 2. | "Pes Mou Ena Psema" (Πες Μου Ένα Ψέμα; Tell Me A Lie) | Christos Kantzelis | Tasos Panagis | 3:16 |
| 3. | "Karavaki" (Καραβάκι; Little Boat) | Giannis Rentoumis | Tony Kontaxakis | 3:48 |
| 4. | "Lipame Ilikrina" (Λυπάμαι Ειλικρινά; I'm Truly Sorry) | Christos Kantzelis | Tasos Panagis | 3:11 |
| 5. | "Fevgo Apopse" (Φεύγω Απόψε; I'm Leaving Tonight) | Christos Kantzelis | Tasos Panagis | 3:05 |
| 6. | "Stasou" (Στάσου; Wait) | Nikos Gritsis | Tasos Panagis | 4:06 |
| 7. | "Zo Ti Stigmi Sou" (Ζω Τη Στιγμή Σου; I Live In Your Moment) | Vicky Gerothodorou | Vasilis Gavriilidis | 3:57 |
| 8. | "De Pao Kala" (Δε Πάω Καλά; I've Lost My Mind) | Nikos Gritsis | Tasos Panagis | 3:20 |
| 9. | "Gia Fantasou" (Για Φαντάσου; Just Imagine) | Christos Kantzelis | Tasos Panagis | 3:04 |
| 10. | "Evesthiti Kardia" (Ευαίσθητη Καρδιά; Sensitive Heart) | Christos Kantzelis | Tasos Panagis | 2:55 |
| 11. | "Kapou Kapou" (Κάπου Κάπου; Sometimes) | Eleni Giannatsoulia | Giannis Kifonidis | 4:01 |
| 12. | "Ipokrinome" (Υποκρίνομαι; I Pretend) | Thanos Papanikolaou | Vasilis Gavriilidis | 3:41 |
| Total length: | | | | 41:39 |

== Singles ==
The following singles were officially released to radio stations and made into music videos, except the song "De Pao Kala", and had good airplay.

"Lipame Ilikrina"

"Lipame Ilikrina" was the lead single released in October 2007 with music video, directed by Giorgos Gkavalos. It became a considerable airplay hit by the end of the year.

"Eisai Oti Thelo"

"Eisai Oti Thelo" was the second single released in February 2008 with music video, directed by Alexandros Grammatopoulos.

"Pes Mou Ena Psema"

"Pes Mou Ena Psema" was the third single released in April 2008 with music video, directed by Alexandros Grammatopoulos.

"De Pao Kala"

"Den Pao Kala" was the fourth and last single released in June 2008. It was released as a radio single with a remix to radio stations.

== Credits ==
=== Personnel ===
- Mohamed Arafa – percussion (tracks: 2, 6, 8, 9)
- Romeos Avlastimidis – violin (tracks: 11)
- Thanasis Chondros – bass (tracks: 2, 4, 5, 6, 8, 9, 10)
- Vasilis Gavriilidis – orchestration, programming, keyboards (tracks: 7, 12)
- Kostas Gianniris – backing vocals (tracks: 1)
- Thanos Gkiouletzis – violin (tracks: 4, 5, 8, 9, 10)
- Giannis Grigoriou – bass (tracks: 7, 12)
- Anna Ioannidou – backing vocals (tracks: 2, 4, 5, 6, 8, 9, 10)
- Giannis Kifonidis – orchestration, programming, keyboards, guitars, accordion, backing vocals (tracks: 11)
- Simos Kinalis – säz (tracks: 6, 8)
- Katerina Kiriakou – backing vocals (tracks: 7, 12)
- Pantelis Konstantinidis – bouzouki (tracks: 12)
- Spiros Kontakis – guitars (tracks: 7, 12)
- Tony Kontaxakis – guitars (tracks: 3)
- Dimitris Kontopoulos – orchestration, programming, keyboards (tracks: 1)
- Alkis Misirlis – drums (tracks: 7, 12)
- Andreas Mouzakis – drums (tracks: 2, 3, 4, 5, 6, 8, 9, 10)
- Alex Panagi – backing vocals (tracks: 2, 4, 5, 6, 7, 8, 9, 10, 12)
- Tasos Panagis – orchestration, programming, keyboards (tracks: 2, 4, 5, 6, 8, 9, 10)
- Liana Papalexi – backing vocals (tracks: 1)
- Stavros Pazarentsis – clarinet (tracks: 6, 9, 11) / kaval (tracks: 6, 8) / soprano saxophone (tracks: 11)
- Christos Pertsinidis – guitars (tracks: 2, 4, 5, 6, 8, 9, 10)
- Panagiotis Stergiou – guitars (tracks: 3) / bouzouki (tracks: 3, 4, 5, 9, 10) / cura (tracks: 3, 4, 6, 9) / baglama (tracks: 3, 10)
- Pantelis Stoikos – trumpet (tracks: 11)
- Leonidas Tzitzos – orchestration, programming, keyboards (tracks: 7, 12)
- Charis Varthakouris – orchestration, programming, keyboards (tracks: 3)

=== Production ===
- Aris Binis – sound engineer, mix engineer (tracks: 1, 2, 4, 5, 6, 7, 8, 9, 10, 12)
- Vasilis Gavriilidis – production manager (tracks: 7, 12)
- Panos Georgiadis – photographer assistant
- Konstantinos Kagkas – hair styling
- Giannis Kifonidis – production manager, sound engineer, mix engineer (tracks: 11)
- Savvas Konstantinidis – mix engineer (tracks: 3)
- Dimitris Kontopoulos – production manager (tracks: 1)
- Vanesa Koutsopodiotou – make up
- Tzortzia Michalopoulou – photo processing
- Tasos Panagis – production manager (tracks: 2, 4, 5, 6, 8, 9, 10)
- Roula Revi – photographer
- Petros Siakavellas – mastering
- Tasos Sofroniou – styling
- Charis Varthakouris – production manager, sound engineer (tracks: 3)

== Charts ==
Ilikrina made its debut at number 2 on the 'Top 50 Greek Albums' charts by IFPI.

After months, it was certified gold according to sales.

| Chart | Provider | Peak position | # Weeks | Certification |
|---|---|---|---|---|
| Top 50 Greek Albums | IFPI | 2 | 11 | Gold |
