= The Spicy Effect =

- Founded: 2009
- Founder: Phoebus
- Distributors: Soundforge Music Group (physical); Universal Music Greece (digital); Digital Minds (digital, 2009-2013); The Orchard Music (digital, 2013–present)
- Genre: Various
- Country of origin: Greece
- Location: Athens
- Official website: www.spicymusic.gr YouTube channel

The Spicy Effect, commonly referred to as Spicy or Spicy Music, is a Greek independent record label founded in 2009 by songwriter and record producer Phoebus, in association with the investment arm of Nea Tileorasi.

== Overview ==
After eight years under an exclusive songwriting and record production collaboration with independent record label Heaven Music of ANT1 Group, Phoebus announced on 21 October 2019 via his website that he had left the label, without providing further details. This news was followed by a statement from Despina Vandi that she had also left Heaven Music. The fate of the other artists under Heaven Music's roster with whom Phoebus exclusively collaborated were not disclosed by any of the concerned parties. By December 2009, Phoebus announced that he was starting his own record label, with Vandi being the first artist to sign. Thereafter more artist signings to Phoebus' company were announced, including a five-year contract with Elli Kokkinou following her departure from Sony Music Entertainment Greece, with whom Phoebus had worked with on two studio albums while both were under contract at Heaven Music. Nino and Thanos Petrelis, both of whom were also with Heaven Music, signed with the company. The company's trade name – The Spicy Effect – was also revealed following these signings.

In April 2010, The Spicy Effect obtained a digital distribution deal under a licensing agreement with Universal Music Greece, which grants access to popular services such as iTunes Store. C'est La Vie by Vandi marks the first studio album released by the label.

In July 2011, The Spicy Effect announced a collaboration with the record label My Group, founded by Manos Theofilos. The label focuses on dance music and is credited with a number of hits since its inception.

== Charity ==
In December 2010, a remake of Vandi's Christmas song "Christougenna" (Christmas), titled "Christougenna 2010", was released featuring vocals by the entire Spicy Effect roster of artists- Kokkinou, Nino, Panos Kalidis, Elissavet Spanou, Ioakeim Fokas, and Stella Kalli, with the exception of Vandi. The song also features the well-known Spiros Lambrou's children choir. Vandi could not participate in the remake as a clause from her previous recording contract prohibited her from re-recording the song on a different label, however she does appear in the music video. The remake was brought into fruition after Nino held a benefit concert in Agrinio in the summer to raise funds for the rehabilitation of 23-year-old paraplegic Petros Zaferis. Proceeds from the sale of the digital release also went toward his rehabilitation.

== Discography/artists ==
Discography/artists
Artist	Albums/SIngles	Year
Despina Vandi	Albums	
Despina Vandi	C'est La Vie	2010
Despina Vandi	Allaxa	2012
Despina Vandi	Singles	
Despina Vandi	Koritsi Prama	2010
Despina Vandi	Kommati Ap' Tin Kardia Sou	2010
Despina Vandi	Erota Theli I Zoi	2010
Despina Vandi	Gi' Alli Mia Fora	2010
Despina Vandi	Mou 'Heis Perasei	2012
Despina Vandi	Girismata	2012
Despina Vandi	To Nisi	2012
Despina Vandi	T' Asteri Mou	2012
Despina Vandi	Katalavaino	2012
Despina Vandi	Mou Ftiahneis Ti Mera	2012
Despina Vandi	To Ligo Sou Na Zo	2012
Despina Vandi	Allaxa	2012
Despina Vandi	Otan Perasi Afti I Nihta	2013
Despina Vandi	Hano Esena	2013
Elli Kokkinou	Album	
Elli Kokkinou	Ta Genethlia Mou	2011
Elli Kokkinou	Singles	
Elli Kokkinou	Ontos	2010
Elli Kokkinou	Apohoro	2010
Elli Kokkinou	Den Tin Palevo (feat. Vasilis Karras)	2010
Elli Kokkinou	Eroteftika	2011
Elli Kokkinou	Genethlia	2011
Elli Kokkinou	Apisteftos	2011
Elli Kokkinou	Kitaxe Giro Mas	2011
Elli Kokkinou	Kardia Apo Giali	2012
Elli Kokkinou	Kalinihta	2013
Elli Kokkinou	Matia Kleista	2014
Thanos Petrelis	Album	
Thanos Petrelis	Virtrina Esthimaton	2013
Thanos Petrelis	Singles	
Thanos Petrelis	FIlotimo	2010
Thanos Petrelis	Thelo Kai Ta Patheno	2010
Thanos Petrelis	Pia Na Sigkrithi Mazi Sou	2011
Thanos Petrelis	Ap'Exo Pios?	2011
Thanos Petrelis	Horevis (Laiko Mix)	2012
Thanos Petrelis	Horevis (Pop Mix)	2012
Thanos Petrelis	Pia Na Sigkrithi Mazi Sou (Laiko Mix)	2012
Thanos Petrelis	Na Tis Pis	2012
Thanos Petrelis	Teliosame	2013
Thanos Petrelis	Pes Mou (feat. Christina Miliou)	2014
Thanos Petrelis	San Esena	2015
Thanos Petrelis	Thelis De Thelis	2015
Thanos Petrelis	Pes Mou (DJ Pantelis Remix) [feat. The Rook]	2015
Vasilis Karras	Album	
Vasilis Karras	Kirios Ma...Kai Alitis	2013
Vasilis Karras	Singles	

== Spicy Entertainment ==
In early 2011, The Spicy Effect launched Spicy Entertainment, a concert promoting division dealing across Greece and Cyprus, servicing foreign acts.

== The Spicy Labels ==
"The Spicy Effect" has also three labels under this label:

a) "Loca Records by Spicy" was created by Christodoulos Siganos and Valentino, with artists such as DJ Valentino, Constantinos Pantzis, Christina Koletsa and Hrispa (http://www.loca-records.com)

b) "Nuke Records by Spicy / The Urban music label" with artists, such as REC and FlyByWire and

c) "Noize The Label" (née Legend Music) with artists such as Giorgos Giasemis, Nikos Apergis, Dimitris Giotis, Thelxi, Andreas Stamos, Angelos Andreatos. This label is specialized in Laïko music.
