= Princess Chrysí of Greece and Denmark =

Member of the Greek former royal family (born 1981)

Princess Chrysí
- Born: Chrysí Vardinogiánni; 14 August 1981 (age 45)
- Spouse: Stéfanos Xypolitás (m. 2012; div. 2017) Prince Nikolaos of Greece and Denmark (m. 2025)
- Issue: Giórgo Xypolitás; Káren Agápi Xypolitá
- House: Glücksburg (by marriage)
- Father: Yiorgos Vardinogiannis
- Mother: Agapi Politi
- Occupation: Businesswoman

Princess Chrysí of Greece and Denmark (née Chrysí Vardinogiánni, Greek: Χρυσή ντε Γκρες, romanized: Chrysí de Grèce; née Χρυσή Βαρδινογιάννη; born 14 August 1981) is a Greek heiress and member of the former Greek royal family, and the extended Danish royal family, as the second wife of Prince Nikolaos of Greece and Denmark.

== Biography ==
Princess Chrysí is the daughter of Greek shipping magnate Yiorgos Vardinogiannis and Agapi Politi. She is the niece of the billionaire Vardis Vardinogiannis and the activist Marianna Vardinogiannis, and the cousin of the billionaire Giannis Vardinogiannis.

In 2012, she married the Greek singer Stéfanos Xypolitás, better known as Nino, with whom she has two children, Giórgo Skévo Xypolitás (born 2013) and Káren Agápi Xypolitá (born 2014). Following their divorce in 2017, she dated actor Konstantínos Markoulákis for five years, before ending the relationship in December 2023.

In January 2025, she became engaged to Prince Nikolaos of Greece and Denmark, the third child of Constantine II and Anne-Marie of Greece, shortly after his divorce from Tatiana Blatnik. They married in a private ceremony, conducted by Amphilochios, Metropolitan Bishop of Kissamos and Selino, at Holy Church of Saint Nicholas Ragavas in Plaka, Athens on 7 February 2025. She wore the Antique Corsage tiara, which had previously been worn by Princess Tatiana, Princess Nina, and Crown Princess Marie-Chantal.

The wedding was attended by members of various European royal families including Queen Sofía of Spain, Infanta Cristina of Spain, Princess Benedikte of Denmark, Princess Carina of Sayn-Wittgenstein-Berleburg, Princess Alexandra of Sayn-Wittgenstein-Berleburg, Princess Alexia of Greece and Denmark, Marina Karella, and Crown Prince Pavlos of Greece.
