= Andriki Kolonia =

Andriki Kolonia Ανδρική Κολόνια

Studio album by Elli Kokkinou
- Released: 4 July 2000
- Recorded: Sofita studio
- Genre: Pop, Contemporary laika, Dance
- Length: 54:00
- Language: Greek
- Label: Sony Music Greece; Columbia
- Producer: Gavrilis Pantzis

Elli Kokkinou chronology
| Epikindina Paihnidia (1999) | Andriki Kolonia; Ανδρική Κολόνια (2000) | Sto Kokkino (2003) |

Singles from Andriki Kolonia
- 1. "Pao Pao" Released: March 2000; 2. "Andriki Kolonia" Released: July 2000; 3. "Na Ta Mas Pali" Released: September 2000; 4. "Kai Mou Leei" Released: November 2000; 5. "Gia Mia Fora" Released: January 2001

Andriki Kolonia (Greek: Ανδρική Κολόνια; English: Male Cologne) is the second studio album by Greek singer Elli Kokkinou. It was released on 4 July 2000 by Sony Music Greece, selling 20,000 units. The album consists of twelve songs, including her two big hits "Andriki Kolonia" and "Na Ta Mas Pali", which gained massive airplay in clubs and radio stations. It also contains a cover from famous hit Pao Pao.

== Tracklist ==
All music is composed by Konstantinos Pantzis, Ramon Monchito (4, 13)

| No. | Title | Lyrics | Length |
|---|---|---|---|
| 1. | "Andriki Kolonia" (Ανδρική Κολόνια; Male Cologne) | Natalia Germanou | 4:37 |
| 2. | "Paradinomai" (Παραδίνομαι; I Surrender) | Niki Spyropoulou | 5:20 |
| 3. | "Kai Mou Leei" (Και Μου Λέει; And He Tells Me) | Evi Droutsa | 3:33 |
| 4. | "Pao Pao" (Πάω Πάω; I'm Going) | Evi Droutsa | 3:38 |
| 5. | "Na Ta Mas Pali" (Να Τα Μας Πάλι; Here We Go Again) | Evi Droutsa | 4:19 |
| 6. | "Lexi Pros Lexi" (Λέξη Προς Λέξη; Word For Word) | Evi Droutsa | 5:50 |
| 7. | "Ki Oso Gia Sena" (Κι Όσο Για Σένα; And As For You) | Natalia Germanou | 3:19 |
| 8. | "Prospatho" (Προσπαθώ; I Try) | Evi Droutsa | 4:17 |
| 9. | "Giati Na Ipohoro" (Γιατί Να Υποχωρώ; Why Should I Retreat) | Evi Droutsa | 3:30 |
| 10. | "Ego De Tha Hatho" (Εγώ Δε Θα Χαθώ; I Won't Get Lost) | Niki Spyropoulou | 3:53 |
| 11. | "De Tha Haseis" (Δε Θα Χάσεις; You Won't Lose) | Natalia Germanou | 3:47 |
| 12. | "Gia Mia Fora" (Για Μια Φορά; For One Time) | Natalia Germanou | 4:21 |
| 13. | "Pao Pao" | Ramon Monchito | 3:36 |
| Total length: | | | 54:00 |

== Singles ==
The following singles were officially released to radio stations, some of them with music videos:

1. "Pao Pao" (I'm Going)
2. "Andriki Kolonia" (Male Cologne)
3. "Na Ta Mas Pali" (Here We Go Again)
4. "Kai Mou Leei" (And He Tells Me)
5. "Gia Mia Fora" (For One Time)

== Credits ==
Credits adapted from liner notes.

=== Personnel ===
- Giorgos Avlonitis – säz (9)
- Yiannis Bithikotsis – bouzouki, cura, baglama (10, 12)
- Akis Diximos – second vocal (2, 8, 10, 12) / backing vocals (1, 3, 4, 5, 7, 9, 11, 13)
- Antonis Gounaris – guitars (1, 2, 3, 4, 6, 7, 8, 9, 10, 11, 12, 13) / oud (9) / cümbüş (11)
- Anna Ioannidou – backing vocals (1, 3, 4, 5, 7, 9, 11, 13)
- Katerina Kyriakou – backing vocals (1, 3, 4, 5, 7, 9, 11, 13)
- Konstantinos Pantzis – orchestration, programming, keyboards
- Stavros Pazarentzis – clarinet (6)
- Giorgos Roilos – percussion (3, 4, 9, 11, 13)
- Nikos Sakellarakis – trumpet (4, 7, 13)
- Philippos Tseberoulis – saxophone (4, 7, 13)

=== Production ===
- Aris Binis – sound engineer, mix engineer
- Thodoris Chrisanthopoulos (Fabelsound) – mastering
- Gavrilis Pantzis – production manager
- Dimitris Rekouniotis – artwork
- Katerina Sideridou – photo processing
