= Epikindyna Paihnidia =

Studio album by Elli Kokkinou
- Released: 1999
- Genre: Pop, modern laika, dance
- Label: Sony Music Greece/Columbia

Elli Kokkinou chronology
Epikindyna Paihnidia (1999)	Andriki Kolonia (2000)

Epikindyna Paihnidia (Dangerous games) is the debut album by popular Greek artist Elli Kokkinou. It was released in 1999 by Sony Music Greece. This album is currently out of print.

== Track listing ==
1. "Kapoia Mera"
2. "Sto Epomeno Fanari"
3. "Epikindyna Paihnidia"
4. "Prepei"
5. "Auto Tha Kano"
6. "Tha Deis Mia Alli"
7. "Paramythenio Asteri"
8. "Kammeno Sidero"
9. "Stamata"
10. "Ki Omos Eheis Fygei"
11. "An Ginotan"
12. "Anagazomai"
13. "Prospatho"
14. "Ksehna Me"
15. "Den Hreiazetai"
16. "Oso Ki An Pethaino"
