= Phoebus (songwriter) =

Phoebus Φοίβος
- Also known as: Fivos; Phivos
- Born: Evangelos-Phoebus Tassopoulos; 1 January 1971 (age 55); Athens, Greece
- Genres: Modern laïko; pop; dance; rock
- Occupation: Songwriter
- Years active: 1993–present
- Labels: Sony Music Greece; Minos EMI; Heaven Music; The Spicy Effect
- Website: phoebusmusic.com

Evangelos-Phoebus Tassopoulos (Greek: Ευάγγελος-Φοίβος Τασσόπουλος; born 1 January 1971), better known better known mononymously as Phoebus (Greek: Φοίβος, pronounced [ˈfivos]; sometimes spelled Phivos or Foivos), is a well-known songwriter in both Greece and Cyprus. Phoebus is mostly known for his music through Despina Vandi and Katy Garbi, although he has composed albums for many other artists in Greece and Cyprus. A high percentage of the albums he composes receive certification making him one of the most successful Greek songwriters of the 1990s and 2000s, selling 6,000,000 records. In 2009, he founded his own record label, The Spicy Effect, to which he has signed various artists, many of whom he has collaborated with in the past.

== Biography ==
Phoebus was born in Athens, Greece. He first got interested in music during his school years where he was a drummer in a rock band. During that time he experimented with the music fads of the time. Despite getting into Athens Law School, Phoebus did not want to pursue a career in law, and instead focused on his involvement in music and began to compose his first songs. While studying harmony and music at the conservatory and taking private tutorials by Demis Roussos, he started writing his first lyrics. His talent was quickly shown, and he signed his first contract with a record label at age 22.

At the start of his second decade in music, Phoebus made several record accomplishments. By that time, he had composed over 18 gold LPs and CD singles, 19 platinum, nine albums that are two times platinum, two albums that are three times platinum; Evaisthisies and Profities, two four times platinum; Gia and To Kati and one six times platinum CD single; "Ipofero", selling more than 150,000 units. This in turn gave him his name in Greek music history.

During his career, Phoebus has shown the ability in mixing popular music trends with different ideas as well as bringing new artists into the spotlight with his music. Apart from writing and composing, Phoebus, almost exclusively, programs, orchestrates and produces his albums. His producing abilities have broken new ground while he has gone on to sign the highest contracts with all of the record labels he has worked with; starting off with Sony Music Greece, moving to Minos EMI and finally signing on to Heaven Music.

In the summer of 2001, Phoebus' career passed a significant milestone as he gained international recognition. Along with Despina Vandi, he received the award for the best-selling album of the year in Greece for the CD single "Ipofero" ("I'm Suffering"), awarded to him by the director of the Virgin Megastores in London, Sir Richard Branson.

In the period 2001–02, Phoebus collaborated with the international producer Desmond Child and other international producers, for the Sakis Rouvas album, Ola Kala, which was released in the European market by Universal Music France. The album was released in Greece by Minos EMI.

On March 6, 2002, Phoebus and Despina Vandi, received another honour. They won the "World’s Best-Selling Greek Artist 2001" award (for the sales of the album Gia) in the World Music Awards.

In 2002, Phoebus collaborated with two of the biggest stars of the former Yugoslavia—Jelena Karleuša of Serbia and Toše Proeski from Macedonia—and worked with famous Serbian lyricist Marina Tucaković to produce their 2002 albums. Proeski released Ako me pogledaš u oči in October 2002, and Karleuša released Samo za tvoje oči in December 2002. The albums were released in Serbia by RTV BK Telecom, which purchased the rights from Heaven Music.

The greatest global success composed by Phoebus came with the song "Gia" by Despina Vandi. It went multi-platinum in the Greek market, and broke into the international music scene. It was included in the playlists of celebrated DJs and clubs worldwide. "Gia" reaching the No1 spots in the US Billboard Dance Charts and the UK Dance Charts. It was released as a CD single in Europe, the US, Australia, Turkey and Northern Africa while it has been included in more than 120 compilations, worldwide.

In the spring of 2004, Phoebus teamed up with Coca-Cola to compose the tune that will accompany all of Coca-Cola's activities in its Olympic Sponsorship agreement. Phoebus composed the song "Come Along Now" with Despina Vandi singing it, and the tune was heard all around the world in Coca-Cola's ads.

In the beginning of 2005, the Greek football team AEK asked Phoebus to compose the team's new anthem. This imposing melody is played and sung by the team's sports fans until today.

2005 and 2006 were again big years for Phoebus. Despina Vandi's album Stin Avli Tou Paradeisou, after a huge local success was also released in Bulgaria, Russia, Ukraine and Turkey reaching the 2nd position on the charts. The album was also repackaged for the Greek market entitled "Special Edition" and contained 4 new songs composed by Phoebus. The album sold over 100,000 copies in Greece only. Both albums were used by TIM telecommunications for their campaign throughout the whole year since they had a sponsorship contract with Despina Vandi.

In mid 2005, Phoebus and Victoria Halkiti teamed up and release the song "Telia", which once again was used by Coca-Cola's ads, but only in Greece and their Sound Wave campaign. Only a few months later their next single "F...Magic" was heard in all the Attica commercials, one of Athens's biggest shopping malls.

After big scores during the 2005 and 2006, together with artists such as Despina Vandi, Elli Kokkinou, Thanos Petrelis, Giorgos Mazonakis and Victoria Halkiti, Phoebus composed the Christmas dance single "Kalanta" along with Despina Vandi. The single was once again used by TIM telecommunications for their 2006 Christmas campaign. After only two weeks from release date Phoebus and Vandi achieved a 2× platinum CD single.

This success over the years and particularly with Despina Vandi has put a name out in the Greek music industry that Phoebus is the composer to go to for an automatic hit. This can be seen also with Heaven Music asking him to compose a song on Fame Story finalist Maro Lytra's second album, which shot her to the number 1 spot on the radio charts with the song "I Mihani Tou Hronou" (The Time Machine).

After some delay, October 21, 2009, brought the end of Phoebus's eight-year collaboration with Heaven Music, announcing through his official site. Reasons of this label change, and the fate of the artists he was collaborating with under the label's name including Despina Vandi and Thanos Petrelis were currently unknown at the time. Vandi officially announced she was leaving Heaven Music on November 2, 2009.

In 2009, he founded with the Star Channel Group, the record label “The Spicy Effect” and has since been successfully active in all aspects of the music industry. It is noteworthy that Spicy became the first independent music company in Greece to operate with the 360 model.

At the same time, with his unstoppable musical career in Greece, Foivos has also composed songs for countries abroad, such as Asia, South Korea & Japan, Serbia and Turkey.

In 2019, he wrote music for the soundtrack of the movie "The miracle of the Sargasso sea", which is actually performed by the protagonist, directed by Sylla Tzoumerka. He also attended the premiere of the film at the 69th Berlin International Film Festival. The orchestral piece that he composed and musically closes the film, received a nomination for the Best Music Award at the 2020 Iris Awards of the Hellenic Film Academy.

In early 2021, Phoebus participated as a judge in the reality talent show House of Fame broadcast by Skai TV.

In June 2022, Foivos realized Desmond Child's biggest and only concert "Desmond Child rocks the Parthenon" for the reunion of the Parthenon Sculptures, with the participation of Alice Cooper, Bonnie Tyler, Rita Wilson, Sakis Rouvas, The Rasmus, Kip Winger, Chris Willis, George Lebesis, Tabitha Fair, Justin Benlolo & Andrea Carlsson!

In November 2022, the idea of "Gia – The Musical", born a year earlier on the occasion of the 20th anniversary of the legendary album "Gia", becomes a reality and everyone is talking about the musical of the year. Phoebus made new arrangements of the big hits, while he also wrote new songs, especially for the theatrical adaptation of the album.

Until today, he has collaborated with the biggest names of Greek singers such as: Vassilis Karras, Yiannis Parios, Tolis Voskopoulos, Antonis Remos, Sakis Rouvas, Kaiti Garbi, Despina Vandi, Natasa Theodoridou, Elli Kokkinou, George Mazonakis, Yiannis Ploutarhos, Elena Paparizou, Pashalis Terzis, Dionysis Schinas, Antipas, Dimitris Kokotas, Angela Dimitriou, Giorgos Lembesis, Thanos Petrelis, Manto, Thanos Kalliris, Victoria Chalkiti, Eleni Dimou, Angelos Dionysiou, Konstantina etc.

== The Spicy Effect ==
In 2009, Phoebus decided to start his own record company, in collaboration with Star Channel called "The Spicy Effect", and has signed Despina Vandi, Elli Kokkinou, Nino, and Thanos Petrelis, among others.

== Discography ==
Phoebus has collaborated with the following artists:

- Aggelos Dionysiou
  - Fovamai Mi Fygeis (Minos EMI - 1994)**
  - Iposyneidito (Minos EMI - 1999)*
- Alexandra
  - Meli Kai Fotia (Sony Music / RIA - 1994)*
- Angela Dimitriou
  - Pes Afto Pou Theleis (Sony Music - 1994)*
  - Ftanei (Sony Music - 1995) - Vinyl Single
  - Mi Mas Agapas (Minos EMI - 1996)*
  - 100% (Minos EMI - 1998)
  - Margarites (Minos EMI - 1999) - CD Single
- Anna Fotiou
  - Poias Gynaikas Fili (BMG / Ariola - 1994)*
- Antonis Remos
  - Antonis Remos (Sony Music - 1996)*
- Christina Maragkozi
  - Agkalia Gemati Agathia (Sony Music - 1996)*
- Despina Vandi
  - Deka Entoles (Minos EMI - 1997)*
  - Spania (Minos EMI - 1998) - CD Single
  - Profities (Minos EMI - 1999)
  - Ipofero (Minos EMI - 2000) - EP
  - Gia (Heaven Music - 2001)
  - Ante Gia (Heaven Music - 2002) - EP
  - Gia & Ante Gia Collector's Edition (Heaven Music - 2002) - Includes the album "Geia", the EP "Ante Geia" and some other remixes
  - Gia (Heaven Music/Ministry of Sound - 2003) - CD Single
  - Gia US Edition (Heaven Music/Escondida Music - 2003)
  - Live (Heaven Music - 2003)
  - Come Along Now (Heaven Music - Version 1 - 2004) - CD Single ft. the theme of Coca-Cola 2004 campaign
  - Come Along Now (Heaven Music - Version 2 - 2004) - CD Single ft. the theme of Coca-Cola 2004 campaign
  - Opa Opa (Heaven Music/Ministry of Sound - 2004)*** - CD Single
  - Come Along Now (Heaven Music/Ministry of Sound - 2004) - Worldwide Album released in 3 different versions
  - Stin Avli Tou Paradisou (Heaven Music - 2004)
  - Special Edition (Heaven Music - 2005) - Repackaged Edition of the album "Stin Avli Tou Paradeisou"
  - Kalanta (Heaven Music - 2006) - EP
  - 10 Hronia Mazi (Heaven Music - 2007)
  - 10 Hronia Mazi - It's Destiny (Heaven Music - 2008) - Repackaged Edition of the album "10 Hronia Mazi", including the song "Destiny" with Schiller. Almost all the remixes of the original version are removed.
  - C'est le vie (The Spicy Effect - 2010)
  - Allaxa (The Spicy Effect - 2012)
- Dimitris Kokotas
  - Diadoseis (Eros Music - 1994)
  - Sineidisi (Eros Music - 1995)
  - Dance Mixes (Eros Music - 1997) - CD Single
  - Aharistia (Eros Music - 1997)
- Dionysis Shoinas
  - Proti Agapi (Sony Music - 1994)*
  - S'Agapo (Sony Music - 1995)*
  - An M' Agapas (To Dahtylidi) / Esy Ki O Haraktiras Sou (Sony Music - 1995)* - CD Single
  - S'Agapo (Sony Music - 1995)* - Repackaged album including 2 bonus tracks
  - Mou Tairiazeis (Sony Music - 2000) - EP
- Efi Sarri
  - Petao (Minos EMI - 1994)
- Eleni Dimou
  - I Eleni Ton Feggarion (Sony Music - 1994)*
- Eleni Foureira
  - Vasilissa (Panik Records - 2017)*
- Eleni Hatzidou
  - Eleni Hatzidou (The Spicy Effect - 2016)*
- Elli Kokkinou
  - Sto Kokkino (Heaven Music - 2003)
  - Platinum Edition (Heaven Music - 2004) - Repackaged Edition of the album "Sto Kokkino"
  - Sex (Heaven Music - 2005)
  - Ki Allo... (Heaven Music - 2006) - Repackaged Edition of the album "Sex"
  - Ta Genethlia Mou (The Spicy Effect - 2011)
- Giannis Parios
  - Typseis (Minos EMI - 1997)
- Giannis Ploutarhos
  - Thema Hronou (Heaven Music - 2016)
- Giorgos Daskoulidis
  - Harise Mou Ena Lepto (Sony Music / RIA - 1993)*
- Giorgos Gerolymatos
  - Fotia Mou Magissa (Sony Music - 1993)*
- Giorgos Lempesis
  - Eksartisi (Minos EMI - 1999)
  - I Agapi Vlaptei Sovara Tin Ygeia (Heaven Music - 2001)
  - Eliksirio (Heaven Music - 2002)* - CD Single
  - I Mera I Kali (Heaven Music - 2003)*
- Giorgos Mazonakis
  - Koita Me + Beat (Heaven Music - 2002)* - Repackaged edition of the album "Koita Me", featuring two new songs by Phoebus
  - Savvato (Heaven Music - 2003)
  - Savvato + To Gucci Ton Masai (Heaven Music - 2004) - Repackaged edition of the album "Savvato"
  - Summer In Greece! (Heaven Music - 2006) - EP
  - S' Eho Epithymisei (Heaven Music - 2007) - CD Single
  - Ta Ohi Kai Ta Nai Mou (Heaven Music - 2007)*
- Helena Paparizou
  - Ouranio Toxo (Minos EMI Universal - 2017)*
- Jelena Karleuša
  - Samo za tvoje oči (RTV BK Telecom - 2002)
- Katy Garbi
  - Os Ton Paradeiso (Sony Music - 1993)*
  - Atofio Hrysafi (Sony Music - 1994)*
  - Arhizo Polemo (Sony Music - 1996)*
  - Evaisthisies (Sony Music - 1997)
  - Mou Leipeis (Sony Music - 1998) - CD Single
  - To Kati (Sony Music - 2000) - Double compilation album, including 7 new songs and a new medley remix of two older ones
  - TBA (Panik Records - 2022)
- Konstantina
  - Erhomai (Minos EMI - 1996)*
  - Remixes (Minos EMI - 1997)* - CD Single
- Lefteris Pantazis
  - Ego Den Eimai Ego (Sony Music - 1993)*
- Manto
  - Gia Oles Tis Fores (Sony Music - 1997)*
  - Mataia Remix (Sony Music - 1997) - CD Single
- Maro Lytra
  - I Mihani Tou Hronou (Heaven Music - 2007)*
- Milica Pavlović
  - Boginja (Grand Production - 2016)*
  - Zauvek (Grand Production - 2018)*
  - Posesivna (Señorita Music - 2022)*
  - Lav (Señorita Music - 2023)*
  - Milijarda EP (Señorita Music - 2024)*
  - Caka (Señorita Music - 2026)*
- Natasa Pantelidi
  - Erotas Tha Pei (Sony Music - 1995)*
- Natasa Theodoridou
  - Natasa Theodoridou (Sony Music - 1997)*
  - Perifania Mono (Heaven Music - 2022) - Digital Single*
- Nikos Oikonomopoulos
  - Tha Eimai Edo (Minos EMI - 2011)*
- Nino
  - 14 Flevari (The Spicy Effect - 2012) - CD Single released in different Postcard type covers
- Outloud
  - Let's Get Serious (ROAR Records - 2014)*
- Pashalis Terzis
  - Mesogeios (Sony Music - 1994)*
  - Astatos (remix) (Sony Music - 1995)* - CD Single
  - Afise Me Mono (Sony Music - 1995)*
  - Auta Einai Ta Tragoudia Mou (Sony Music - 1996)*
  - Ta Zeimbekika Tou Pashali (Sony Music - 2001)* - Compilation album including the previously unreleased song "Ki An De Me Thes" written by Phoebus
- Petros Kolettis
  - Twra Einai H Seira Mou (Alfa Mi Records - 1994)*
- Polina
  - Kainourios Erotas (Sony Music - 1994)*
  - Deka Hronia Meta (Sony Music - 1995)*
- Red Velvet
  - Perfect Velvet (SM Entertainment Korea - 2018)*
- Sakis Rouvas (collaboration with Desmond Child)
  - Disco Girl (Minos EMI - 2001) - CD Single
  - Disco Girl European Release (Universal Music France - 2002) - CD Single
  - Ola Kala (Minos EMI - 2002)*
  - Ola Kala European Release (Minos EMI/Universal Music France - 2002)*
  - Sta Kalytera Mou (Minos EMI Universal - 2021)
- Stathis Aggelopoulos
  - Krypse Me Stin Aggalia Sou (Sony Music - 1994)*
- Stathis Raftopulos
  - O,ti Pio Omorfo (Heaven Music - 2008) - EP
- Stavros Markonis*
  - Risk of Rain 2: Alloyed Collective (Big No(i)see - 2025)
- Stella Konitopoulou
  - Diavatirio (Sony Music - 1997)*
- Thanos Kalliris
  - Kapoio Kalokairi (Sony Music - 1994)*
  - Monaxa Tin Psyhi Sou (Sony Music - 1996)*
- Thanos Petrelis
  - Eixe To Hroma T' Ouranou (Heaven Music - 2004)*
  - Thymizeis Kati Apo Ellada (Heaven Music - 2005)
  - Eftyhos (Heaven Music - 2006) - EP
  - Eimai Akomi Eleftheros (Heaven Music - 2007)
  - Eimai Akomi Eleftheros (Special Edition) (Heaven Music - 2007) - Repackaged edition of the album "Eimai akoma eleftheros".
  - Ksypna Thanasi (Heaven Music - 2008) - EP
  - To Paihnidi Einai Pleon Diko Mou (Heaven Music - 2008) - EP
  - Live (Heaven Music - 2009)
- Tolis Voskopoulos
  - I Sosti Apantisi (Heaven Music - 2002)
  - The Greek Experience (Heaven Music - 2004)* - Compilation album with the new duet "Mia Gynaika Ftaiei" with Vasilis Karras.
- Toše Proeski
  - Ako me pogledaš u oči (RTV BK Telecom - 2002)* - Serbo-Croatian-language version of the album
  - Ako me pogledneš vo oči (MRT - 2002)* - Macedonian-language version of the album
- Vasilis Karras
  - Tilefonise Mou (Minos EMI - 1996)
  - Fenomeno (Minos EMI - 1998) - CD Single
  - Epistrefo (Minos EMI - 1999)
  - The Greek Experience (Heaven Music - 2004)* - Compilation album with the new duet "Mia Gynaika Ftaiei" with Tolis Voskopoulos.
  - Kyrios Ma... Kai Alitis (The Spicy Effect - 2013)
- Vicky Haritou
  - Styl (BMG / Ariola - 1993)
- Victoria Halkiti
  - Teleia (Heaven Music - 2005) - CD Single ft. the theme of Coca-Cola 2005 campaign
  - Teleia f***ing edition (Heaven Music - 2006) - CD Single - Repackaged Edition of the cd single "Teleia"
- Other
  - In 1994, a compilation of songs written by Phoebus (music & lyrics) and Eleni Giannatsoulia (some lyrics) was released by Sony Music. The title of the record was Gia Sena Kai Gia Mena and featured songs by a lot of Greek singers: Sofia Arvaniti, Katy Garbi, Thanos Kalliris, Dionysis Shoinas, Pashalis Terzis, Polina, Natassa Pantelidi, Ntinos Vrettos, Petros Kolettis and Lorna.
  - In 1995, Phoebus composed the music for the opening credits of the Greek TV serial Tzin kai Tserry, broadcast by Mega Channel. The song featured vocals by Katy Garbi.
  - In 1997, the single "Love Will Make A Difference" was released by Sony Music. The song featured Ronny Money.
  - In 1999, a different version of the song "Margarites" (originally performed by Angela Dimitriou) was released by Sony Music. The song was called "Makapy" and was performed by Santiago. In the same year, a compilation of some songs performed by Angela Dimitriou was released in Arabic countries, due to the huge success of "Margarites". The album included songs composed by Phoebus and Giorgos Theofanous, another composer from Cyprus.
  - In the 1990s, Phoebus composed two songs exclusively for the TV show Bravo, presented by Roula Koromila. The first song, "Ki eixa pou les" was a duet between Koromila and Antonis Remos, whereas the second one, entitled "Sas agapame", featured Koromila as the lead singer, accompanied by the children choir of Spyros Lamprou. In 2016, Phoebus collaborated with Koromila once again, composing the music for her TV show Bravo Roula.
  - In 2001, Phoebus and Heaven Music released the CD single "BB Project" which was the official soundtrack of the Greek Big Brother TV show of ANT1 Television. Next year, Phoebus composed the song of the Greek Star Academy show, Fame Story. The song's title was "You can be a star" and was performed by Giorgos Florakis. Phoebus used the nickname "Jason Jazzmind" in both projects, instead of his original name.
  - In 2004, Coca-Cola released the CD single "Coca-Cola", including the instrumental song "Paralos", written exclusively by Phoebus for the Athens 2004 Olympic Games campaign. The song is also included in the CD single "Come Along Now" of Despina Vandi.
  - In 2005, Phoebus composed the anthem of the Greek soccer team AEK. The song was called "Mia Agapi Exw Stin Kardia" and was performed by Giorgos Florakis. Released by Heaven Music.
  - Since 2009, Phoebus has been producing some songs available only in Digital Singles and not in complete albums. He has produced such songs for Akis Deiksimos, Antypas, Apostolia Zoi, Aspa Tsina, Barrice, Christina Maragozi, Christos Cholidis, Christos Menidiatis, Despina Vandi, Dionysis Shoinas, ELena Domazou, Loukas Yorkas Elissavet Spanou, Giannis Apostolidis, Giorgos Giasemis, Giorgos Ksylouris, Ioakeim Fokas, Kostas Martakis, Lefteris Pantazis, Maria Korelli, Natasa Theodoridou, Nino, Panos Kallidis, Stella Kalli, Thanos Petrelis, Tus and Vaggelis Kakouriotis.
  - In 2019, Phoebus along with Jean-Paul Wall, Drog_A_Tek composed the soundtrack of the movie "The Miracle of the Sargasso Sea" by Syllas Tzoumerkas.
  - In October 2021, Phoebus and Sakis Rouvas collaborated once again in the song "Hronia Polla" that is featured in the McDonald's advertisement, celebrating the 30 year anniversart of the brand in Greece.
  - In 2022, Phoebus wrote the son "Agria Gi" (performed by Vicky Karnezi) for the Skai TV Serial with the same name.

Notes:

(*) Phoebus composed only some tracks and not the whole album.

(**) In 1994, Phoebus composed the song "Pes Mou Ti Sou Kanei" for the album "Fovamai Mi Fygeis" of Aggelos Dionysiou. According to the album's credits, the composer of the song seems to be Mirto Nikolopoulou. In fact, the real composer is Phoebus.

(***) The song "Opa Opa" was composed by Giorgos Alkaios and not by Phoebus. This song was originally performed by the Greek singer, Notis Sfakianakis in 1992. In 1999, a second, more beat version of "Opa Opa" was performed by the group Antique, which gave a rebirth to the song. The Despina Vandi version is the final one and features English lyrics for the first time. Although Phoebus is not the composer of the song, he was involved in the arrangements and the whole production. "Opa Opa" became an international hit.

== 20-year anniversary concert ==
On 24 September 2012, a special 20-year anniversary special concert dedicated to Phoebus was held. The concert took place in the OAKA Stadium in Athens and featured the majority of the artists that have collaborated with Phoebus during the last 20 years. The artists that participated are: Despina Vandi, Katy Garbi, Angela Dimitriou, Thanos Kalliris, Panos Kalidis, Vasilis Karras, Elli Kokkinou, Dimitris Kokotas, Konstantina, Giorgos Mazonakis, Manto, Nino, Thanos Petrelis, Antonis Remos, Dionysis Shoinas and Tus. The show was directed by Fokas Evaggelinos. On 25 December 2012, the concert was broadcast for the first time by ANT1 Television and in late October 2013, its audio part was released in a 4-cd deluxe package by Spicy.
