= Paschalis Terzis =

Greek singer (born 1949)

Paschalis Terzis Πασχάλης Τερζής
- Born: 24 April 1949 (age 77); Pylaia, Kingdom of Greece
- Genres: Laiko, Modern laika
- Years active: 1974–2026
- Labels: Sony Music Greece/Akti, Minos EMI

Paschalis Terzis (Greek: Πασχάλης Τερζής; born 24 April 1949) is a Greek singer.

== Biography ==
Terzis was born on 24 April 1949 in Pylaia, a suburb of Thessaloniki. In his early teens, he began to sing with friends, some of whom helped him in his career. After moving to Athens, he began performing as a back-up vocalist in popular music centres, with famous Greek singers of the 1960s, including Tzeni Vanou.

Since the 1980s, Terzis has recorded many albums, several of which remain popular to the present day. He continues to make new albums, perform at music scenes in Athens and Thessaloniki, and appears on talk shows.

In the winter period 2006–2007, Paschalis Terzis had a music program with Elena Paparizou and Nino Ksipolitas at club Iera Odos. His daughter Yianna Terzi is also a singer.

== Discography ==
=== Studio albums ===
Year	Title	Certification
1982	Leo (Λέω)	—
1983	Mila mou ston eniko (Μίλα μου στον ενικό)	—
1986	Ethniki Thessalonikis (Εθνική Θεσσαλονίκης)	—
1991	Eimai monos mou (Είμαι μόνος μου)	—
1991	Tha thela na'soun edo (Θα 'θελα να σουν εδώ)	—
1992	Mia afierosi kardias(Μια αφιέρωση καρδιάς)	—
1993	Aftoi pou de milane (Αυτοί που δε μιλάνε)	—
1994	Mesogeios (Μεσόγειος)	Gold
1995	Afise me mono (Άφησε με μόνο)	Gold
1997	Paliokairos (Παλιόκαιρος)	2× Platinum
1998	O dikos mou o dromos (Ο δικός μου Ο δρόμος)	Platinum
1999	De me katalaves pote (Δε με κατάλαβες ποτέ)	Platinum
2001	Thelo na po (Θέλω να πω)	Platinum
2004	Sta ipogeia einai i thea (Στα υπόγεια είναι η θέα)	Gold
2006	Einai kapoies agapes (Είναι κάποιες αγάπες)	Gold
2007	I diafora (Η διαφορά)	Platinum
2008	Mia nihta zoriki (Μια νύχτα ζόρικη)	Gold
2011	Duo nihtes mono (Δυο νύχτες μόνο)	4× Platinum
2016	O, ti ki an peis sou leo nai (Ό,τι κι αν πεις σου λέω ναι)	—

=== Compilation albums ===
Year	Title	Notes
1996	Afta einai ta tragoudia mou (Αυτά είναι τα τραγούδια μου)	Gold
2000	I megaliteres epitihies: Hthes, simera, avrio... (Οι μεγαλύτερες επιτυχίες: Χθες, σήμερα, αύριο...)	
2005	Ta kalitera (Τα καλύτερα)	
2006	Ta zeimbekika tou Paschali (Τα ζεΪμπέκικα του Πασχάλη)	
2006	Meta tis 12 - Oi kaliteres balantes (Μετά τις 12 - Οι καλύτερες μπαλάντες)	

=== Live albums ===
Year	Title	Notes
2002	Fotia stis nihtes (Φωτιά στις νύχτες)	—
