= Thanos Petrelis =

Greek singer

Thanos Petrelis Θάνος Πετρέλης
- Born: September 27, 1975 (age 50); Athens, Greece
- Origin: Greece
- Genres: Laiko
- Years active: 1998–present
- Labels: Heaven Music (2003–2010); The Spicy Effect (2010–present)
- Website: www.thanospetrelis.gr

Athanasios (Thanos) Petrelis (Greek: Θάνος Πετρέλης, born September 27, 1975) is a Greek singer. He has released four albums and several singles.

== Career ==
=== Fame Story ===
Petrelis was born in Athens, Greece. He finished third in the first Greek reality show Fame Story (2002).

=== 2004–2006: Eihe to hroma tou ouranou and Thimizeis kati apo Ellada ===
In 2004, he released an album entitled Eihe To Hroma T’ Ouranou. The first track, "To Aima Mou", was written by Phoivos and became a hit. The album sold more than 30,000 copies and went gold. At the fourth Arion Music Awards in 2005, Petrelis won Best New Artist for Eihe To Hroma T’ Ouranou.

Petrelis released a new album every year for the next three years. The follow-up to Eihe To Hroma T’ Ouranou was another Phoivos collaboration, Thymizeis Kati Apo Ellada, which went platinum. It was this year that his big hit "Kernao" won two awards in the Arion Awards, "Best Laiko Song" and "Best Song of the Year".

The following release was a platinum single entitled Eftihos. The four songs on the disc were once again written by Phoivos.

=== 2007–present: Eimai Akomi Eleftheros and Vitrina Esthimaton ===
The album Eimai Akomi Eleftheros included the songs "Lathos", "Doxa Soi O Theos", "Aman Kai Pos", "Adiorthoti" and "An Den Eiha Ki Esena", and went gold. Petrelis also went on a world tour in the United States, Australia and South Africa in 2007, with six sold-out concerts. A few months later, Eimai Akomi Eleftheros was re-released with a DVD.

In June 2008, Petrelis traveled to Australia for five sold-out concerts. On June 9, 2008, he released the single "Ksipna Thanasi" (Wake up Thanasi) exclusively on Sfera FM. It was followed by a two-track CD single with the original version of the song and one remix, which was also available with the "Germanos Remix" when purchased exclusively through the telecommunications store Germanos. The song was composed by Phoivos and the single went platinum.

Petrelis diperformedd shows at the club Thea along with Nikos Ikonomopoulos and Yiorgos Tsalikis from August 22 to November 1, 2008. On November 20, Petrelis released the song "To Paihnidi Einai Pleon Diko Mou" exclusively to "Sfera FM", and a music video, filmed in a casino, was released soon after. The song was released to all other radio stations on December 1, 2008. By December, Petrelis released another CD single, this one with four different songs, all composed by Phoebus. The title track "To Paihnidi Einai Pleon Diko Mou" (The Game is Now Mine) was joined by "Efharisto", "Na Hamogelas" and a new remix of the previously released "Xypna Thanassi". The song "Adiorthoti" has been remixed by Master Tempo.

In January 2009, Petrelis traveled to the United States and Canada for nine sold-out concerts. His next appearance in Athens was again on April 23 at the club Thea, with the support of Ikonomopoulos. He finished his appearances there in mid-July, and his next appearance was in Thessaloniki at the club Orama for a few nights only. After a short break, he started appearing on December 4, along with Yiorgos Tsalikis, at Starz.

In January 2010, Petrelis left Heaven Music and signed with Phoivos' record label, The Spicy Effect. On January 23, 2010, he released the radio single "Filotimo" (Pride) written by Phoebus. In November 2010 he again made a successful tour in the US and Canada, with nine sold-out concerts. In December 2010 he released the song "Hristougenna", along with the other artist of The Spicy Effect, and his new solo single "Thelo kai ta patheno".

In March 2011 he went back to Australia for another tour, after his 2008 sold-out tour. This time he performed eight concerts, most of which sold out.

In 2014, he released his fourth studio album, Vitrina Esthimaton.

== Personal life ==
He is married and has three children. He married Sofia Moschopoulou on July 1, 2007, in a wedding ceremony that also served as a baptism for their then ten-month-old daughter. Phoivos served as Petrelis' koumbaros in the wedding, while Nino served as the godfather and Maria Levendi as the godmother for Agapi's baptism. On January 5, 2009, Petrelis' wife gave birth to their second daughter in Athens, Greece. His third daughter was born September 14, 2015.

== Discography ==
=== Studio albums ===
Year	Title	Certification
2004	Eihe to hroma t' ouranou	Gold
2005	Thimizeis kati apo ellada	Platinum
2007	Eimai akomi eleftheros	Gold
2013	Vitrina esthimaton	Gold

=== Live albums ===
Year	Title	Certification
2009	Thanos Petrelis Live	Gold

=== Extended plays ===
Year	Title	Certification
2006	Eftihos	–
2023	Music Box Sessions	–

=== Singles ===
Year	Title
2006	"Eftihos"
2008	"Xipna Thanasi"
2008	"To Paichnidi Einai Pleon Diko Mou"
2010	"Thelo Kai Ta Pathaino"
2010	"Filotimo"
2010	"Christougenna 2010" (with Spicy artists)
2011	"Poia na sigkrithei mazi sou"
2011	"Ap'exo poios?"
2012	"Horevis"
2012	"Na tis peis"
2013	"De tha katso na pethano"
2014	"Pes mou"
2014	"San esena"
2015	"Theleis de theleis"
2016	"Eho mia kardia"
2016	"Mazi den kanoume"
2016	"Logo timis"
2018	"Ti fasi"
2018	"Gia mia vradia"
2019	"Pao diakopes, ta leme!"
2020	"Kounia bela"
2021	"Tha mas pane mesa"
2021	"Stin igeia tis aharistis"
2022	"Val'to magio sou kai figame"
2023	"Katse kala"

=== Compilations ===
Year	Title	Notes
2009	Megales Epitihies	–
2016	Best of Spicy	–

=== DVDs ===
Year	Title	Certification
2006	Thimizeis Kati Apo Ellada - Karaoke	–
