= Heaven Music =

- Parent company: ANT1 Group
- Founded: 2001
- Distributor(s): Mousiko Tahidromio
- Genre: Various
- Country of origin: Greece
- Location: Athens
- Official website: www.heavenmusic.gr

Heaven Music is an independent record label in Athens, Greece, founded in 2001 by ANT1 Group. It is known for signing new and young artists.

== Overview ==
During its first five years of operation under the control of George Levendis, Heaven Music was credited with certifications of a four-time platinum album, three double platinum albums, five platinum albums and twenty-four gold albums, as well as one double platinum, one platinum and eight golden CD-singles.

Heaven had an exclusive contract with the songwriter Phoebus since the company's founding until he left in late 2009. He is well known in Greece and Cyprus for his work with many popular singers and having produced several multi-platinum albums.

Heaven has shown a pattern of interest in new and young singers. It cooperated with parent company's talent show Fame Story, the Greek version of the Star Academy franchise, and signed several of its contestants.

Heaven has worked to promote its artists outside of Greece. In 2002, Heaven began a collaboration with the Ministry of Sound, a leading dance label in Europe, exposing Despina Vandi's album Gia, which was already certified multi-platinum in Greece, across Europe and North America.

Heaven Music also has a digital distribution deal with several national iTunes Stores, as well as with other Greek digital download retailers.

As of March 2014, Heaven Music is the distributor of music recordings from Warner Music Group for Greek and Cypriot market.

== Artists ==
The following artists are signed to Heaven Music as of 2020.

- Themis Adamantidis
- Thanos Petrelis
- Dimitris Basis
- Chrispa
- Rallia Christidou
- Giorgos Daskoulidis
- Kim Diamantopoulos
- Angela Dimitriou
- Angelos Dionysiou
- Stelios Dionysiou
- Gianna Fafaliou
- Dimitra Galani
- Giorgos Giannias
- Nikos Halkousis
- Kostas Haritodiplomenos
- Michalis Hatzigiannis
- Tasos Ioannidis
- Kalomira
- Kon Cept
- Stratos Karalis
- Haris Kostopoulos
- Nikos Kourkoulis
- George P. Lemos
- Kostas Makedonas
- Sofia Manou
- Christina Maragkozi
- Kostas Martakis
- Christos Menidiatis
- Nikiforos
- Despina Olympiou
- Lefteris Pantazis
- Filippos Pliatsikas
- Alkistis Protopsalti
- Stella Samara
- Villi Razi
- Riskykidd
- Angela Sidiropoulou
- Natasa Theodoridou
- Valando Tryfonos
- Michalis Tzouganakis
- Nikos Vertis
- Walkman the Band
- Peggy Zina
- Apostolia Zoi
- Nikos Zoidakis
- Amaryllis
- El Dominicano
