= Kommati Ap' Tin Kardia Sou =

Single by Despina Vandi

from the album C'est La vie
- Released: July 5, 2010
- Recorded: 2010
- Genre: Pop, rock, dance
- Length: 4:19
- Label: The Spicy Effect
- Songwriter(s): Phoebus
- Producer(s): Phoebus

Despina Vandi minor singles chronology
"Koritsi Prama" (2010)	"Kommati Ap' Tin Kardia Sou" (2010)	"Erota Thelei I Zoi" (2010)

"Kommati Ap' Tin Kardia Sou" (Greek: Κομμάτι απ' την καρδιά σου; English: Piece from your heart) is the second single from Greek singer Despina Vandi's eighth studio album C'est La Vie. Written by Phoebus as a radio single on June 7, 2010. On July 6, 2010 the song was released as a digital single with the whole album C'est La Vie.

== Music video ==
The music video for the song was released on July 5, 2010. The director from video clip was Manolis Tzirakis and the main idea from Phoebus. Also, Despina Vandi performed "Kommati Ap' Tin Kardia Sou" as well as a snippet of "Koritsi Prama" at the Mad Video Music Awards.

== Charts ==
Chart	Provider	Peak position
Greek Airplay Chart	Music Control	16
Greek Airplay Chart	Media Inspector	3
