= Ante Gia =

Ante Gia Άντε Γειά

EP by Despina Vandi
- Released: December 18, 2002
- Recorded: 2002, Phase One Recording Studios
- Genres: Dance-pop, electronic, flamenco
- Length: 22:47
- Language: Greek
- Label: Heaven Music
- Director: Phoebus
- Producer: Phoebus

Despina Vandi chronology
Gia (2001)	Ante Gia; Άντε Γειά (2002)	Despina Vandi Live (2007)

Singles from Ante Gia
- 1. "Simera" Released: December 2002; 2. "I Melodia Tis Monaxias"" Released: 2003

"Ante Gia" (Greek: Άντε Γειά; English: Goodbye) is an EP maxi single by Greek singer Despina Vandi released on December 19, 2002 by Heaven Music. The entire EP was written and produced by Phoebus in promotion of the reissue of Vandi's 5× Platinum album Gia, which was reissued as Gia + Ante Gia and as a box set as Gia + Ante Gia: Collector's Edition. The EP contains all new material, with the title track being a response to the single "Gia" (Hello), inspired by that song but in a negative lyrical context. The remix of the songs "Spania" and "Giatriko" is licensed by Vandi's former label Minos EMI.

== Track listing ==
No.	Title	Lyrics	Music	Length
1.	"Simera" (Σήμερα; Today)	Phoebus	Phoebus	5:06
2.	"I Melodia Tis Monaxias" (Η μελωδία της μοναξιάς; The melody of loneliness)	Phoebus	Pheobus	6:02
3.	"Thimisou" (Θυμήσου; Remember)	Phoebus, Vaggelis Konstantinidis	Phoebus	4:39
4.	"Spania - Giatriko (Flamenco Version 2002)" (Σπάνια - Γιατρικό; Rarely - Medicine)	Phoebus	Phoebus	2:57
5.	"Ante Gia" (Άντε γειά; Well, bye)	Phoebus	Phoebus	4:03
Total length:				22:47

== Singles ==
"Simera"

The first single from the EP was "Simera", a dance-pop song that was later rewritten in English as "C'est La Vie" for the international release of the album in 2003. The music video was directed by Kostas Kapetanidis and features Vandi in five different scenes dressed up in different costumes, in front of solid color backgrounds, doing things such as writing on the walls and playing electric guitar. Towards the end her four personas meet in one scene, with the video ending showing speeding cars on a highway.

"I Melodia Tis Monaxias"

The second single was "I Melodia Tis Monaxias". The music video was once again directed by Kapetanidis. In it, Vandi is involved in a car accident and presumably killed. She wanders around, having in an out-of-body experience, before finally being revived at the end.

== Chart performance ==
Ante Gia peaked at number one on the Greek Singles Chart (where EPs chart in Greece). The EP was certified double platinum, recognizing shipments of at least 40,000 units.

Chart	Providers	Peak position	Certification	Sales
Greek Singles Chart	IFPI	1	2× Platinum	40,000

== Credits and personnel ==
Personnel

- Demos Beke - background vocals, second vocals
- Antonis Gounaris - guitars (electrics, acoustics, twelve-strings), orchestration, programming, keyboards
- Panagiotis Haramis - bass
- Roland Hoffman - flamenco guitar
- Katerina Kiriakou - background vocals
- Vaggelis Konstantinidis - lyrics
- Tony Kontaxakis - remix, orchestration
- Ioanna Kolokotroni - background vocals
- Trifon Koutsourelis - orchestration, programming, keyboards, extra programming
- Alex Leon - orchestration, programming, keyboards
- Lilian - background vocals
- Eleana Papaioannou - background vocals
- Grigoris Petrakos - background vocals
- Phoebus - music, lyrics, orchestration, programming, keyboards
- Vasilis Tassopoulos - percussion
- Aspa Tsina - background vocals
- Fotini Tsitsigkou - background vocals
- Despina Vandi - vocals

Production

- Vaggelis Siapatis - sound, computer editing
- Giorgos Stampolis - sound, computer editing
- Nikos Stavropoulos - sound engineer
- Manolis Vlahos - sound, mixing

Design

- C. Coutayar - cover photo
- Panos Kallitsis - make up, hair
- Dimitris Panoulis - photo show

Credits adapted from the album's liner notes.

== Official remixes ==
- 2003: Thimisou (Remix by Nikos Halkousis - G. Koutsouflakis)
- 2007: Thimisou (Soumka Mix)
- 2007: I Melodia Tis Monaxias (Soumka Loneliness Mix)

== Cover versions ==
- 2004: Despina Vandi - C'est La Vie (Simera) (Σήμερα)
- 2006: Cristina Rus - Viaţa Mea (Σήμερα; My life) (Romania)
- 2006: Lana Jurčević - Odlaziš (Σήμερα) (Croatia)
