= Iparhi Zoi =

"Iparhi Zoi" "Υπάρχει ζωή"

Single by Despina Vandi
- Released: 16 June 2009
- Recorded: 2009
- Genre: Pop, rock
- Length: 4:42
- Label: Heaven Music
- Songwriter(s): Phoebus
- Producer(s): Phoebus

Despina Vandi minor singles chronology
"Tha' Thela" (2008)	"Iparhi Zoi" "Υπάρχει ζωή" (2009)	"Koritsi Prama, Part 1" (2010)

"Iparhi Zoi" (Greek: Υπάρχει ζωή; English: There is life) is a song by Greek singer Despina Vandi, written by Phoebus. The song was first performed at the MAD Video Music Awards 2009 on 23 June, but was released to Greek radio stations a week in advance to promote the song and create publicity for Vandi's first new song since her 2007 album 10 Hronia Mazi. It was released as a digital download by Heaven Music on July 13. The song reached number one on Greek Digital Downloads Charts for five weeks in which the three was in a row and topped the Greek airplay charts for four weeks. According to the Greek "Chart Show" and IFPI, the song is in the twenty seventh position in the Top 30 with the Greek songs which were most radio airplay during 2005-2010.

== Music video ==
The music video for the song was created using the footage from Vandi's live performance at the MAD Video Music Awards 2009. The choreography was arranged by Konstantinos Rigos.

== Charts ==
Chart	Provider	Peak position
Greek Digital Downloads Chart	Billboard	1
Greek Airplay Chart	Music Control	1
Annual Greek Airplay Charts (Generally)	Music Control	15
Annual Greek Airplay Charts (Greek songs only)	Music Control	4
Greek Airplay Chart	Media Inspector	1

== Covers ==
- Romana Paniċ covered the song using Serbian lyrics under the title "Dragi" in December 2009.
