= Sunday (Schiller song) =

Song by Schiller with Despina Vandi

from the album C'est La Vie
- Released: May 17, 2010
- Genre: Pop, Ambient, Lounge
- Length: 3:59
- Songwriter(s): Phoebus, Christopher von Deylen
- Producer(s): Phoebus, Schiller

"Sunday" is a song by Schiller, with vocals by Despina Vandi. It is the first single and included on the Schiller's album Breathless, the international version of Schiller's album Atemlos. The song is written and produced by both Phoebus and Schiller. It is the second international collaboration between Despina Vandi and German band Schiller. The first one was the song Destiny, in 2008.

== Release history ==
Until now the album Breathless has already released in Czech Republic and Slovakia. Also, it released in Russia on the end of May and later is going to be released in England, USA and China. In May 2010 the album released in Greece. The song is also included on Despina Vandi's album C'est La Vie. An exclusive version of Sunday by Schiller is also included on the revised edition of the C'est La Vie album in Greece. That version will also included in the revised version of the album Breathless on January 4, 2011. On October 2, 2010, announced that the Sunday will also included on the new Schiller's album Lichtblick, which will be released on November 26, 2010. The album Breathless reached until number 10 in the chart of IFPI in Greece.

Song	Album	Country	Release date
Sunday	Breathless	Czech Republic	May 17, 2010
Sunday	Breathless	Slovakia	May 17, 2010
Sunday	Breathless	Russia	May 2010
Sunday	Breathless	Greece	May 2010
Sunday	C'est La Vie	Greece	June 13, 2010
Sunday	Lichtblick	Germany	November 26, 2010
Sunday (Exclusive Version)	C'est La Vie (Revised)	Greece	June 24, 2010
Sunday (Exclusive Version)	Breathless (Revised)	Germany	January 4, 2011
Sunday (Exclusive Version)	Breathless (Revised)	USA	January 4, 2011
