= Panos Kallitsis =

- Born: 23 February 1974 (age 52); Athens, Piraeus
- Occupations: Make-up artist / Hairstylist
- Website: http://www.panoskallitsis.gr

Panos Kallitsis (born 23 February, 1974) is a Greek hairstylist and make-up artist, who runs his own studio.

== Biography ==
=== Early life ===
Panos Kallitsis was born in Athens, Greece and raised in Piraeus. The first stimulants into the fashion industry and styling came from his father, also a hair stylist at the time.

=== Career ===
Kallitsis from a very young age he realized that styling was what he wanted to do. He started by working in Athens, but very soon in the age of 20, moved to London where he studied make up and hair styling. In parallel he works part-time for shows and fashion events. In 1998 he moved to Brussels where he studied at the Vidal Sassoon school with a scholarship.

In 2000 he returned to Greece, where he achieves acknowledgement as one of several Greek makeup artists.

During the last decade Panos Kallitsis has worked in practically all aspects of the Greek show business, from creating hairstyles for models on catwalks, magazine covers and beauty contests to make up and makeovers for famous actors, TV hosts and journalists.

He has worked exclusively with almost all prominent Greek designers, major magazines such as Celebrity, Woman, Madame Figaro, Elle, Esquire, Nitro, Status and many of the most famous names in the Greek fashion, TV and music industry such as singers Haris Alexiou, Giannis Kotsiras and Despina Vandi, TV hosts Eleonora Meleti, Eleni Menegaki, Elena Katritsi and Sakis Rouvas.

His work has been featured many times on some of the most popular Greek fashion magazines and fashion shows.

Although he is regarded by many as a celebrity makeup artist and hairstylist, he says that his work does not have to do with someone being famous or not, but with trying to create for anyone a “unique style”.
