= Gela Mou =

Album by Despina Vandi

Gela Mou Γέλα Μου

Studio album by Despina Vandi
- Released: June 3, 1994
- Recorded: Studio Polysound
- Genre: Laïka, contemporary laïka
- Length: 33:43
- Language: Greek
- Label: Minos EMI

Despina Vandi chronology
Gela Mou; Γέλα Μου (1994)	Esena Perimeno (1996)

Singles from Gela Mou
- 1. "Gela Mou" Released: June 03, 1994; 2. "Den Iparhi Tipota" Released: 1994; 3. "To Adiexodo (feat. Giannis Parios)" Released: 1994

Gela Mou (Greek: Γέλα Μου; English: Smile for me) is the first studio album by Greek singer Despina Vandi. It was released in Greece in 1994 by Minos EMI. It includes her first mass hits "Gela mou", "Den Iparhi Tipota" and "To Adiexodo", a duet with Greek singer Giannis Parios. Αccording to Despina Vandi it sold 14,000 copies.

== Track listing ==
No.	Title	Lyrics	Music	Length
1.	"Gela Mou" (Γέλα μου; Smile for me)	Vasilis Karras	Vasilis Karras	4:00
2.	"Apopse Klei O Ouranos" (Απόψε κλαίει ο ουρανός; Tonight the sky is crying)	Tony Kontaxakis	Tony Kontaxakis	4:57
3.	"Erotevmeni" (Ερωτευμένη; In love)	Tony Kontaxakis	Tony Kontaxakis	3:37
4.	"Mathe-Mathe" (Μάθε-μάθε; Learn, learn)	M. Doulianakis	P. Apostolidis	2:56
5.	"Akriva" (Ακριβά; Expensive)	L. Komninos	P. Apostolidis	2:30
6.	"To Adiexodo (feat. Giannis Parios)" (Το αδιέξοδο; The deadlock)	Vasilis Karras	Vasilis Karras	2:58
7.	"Den Iparhi Tipota" (Δεν υπάρχει τίποτα; There is nothing)	Tony Kontaxakis	Tony Kontaxakis	3:43
8.	"Apopse I Aggeli" (Απόψε οι αγγέλοι; Tonight the angels)	L. Komninos	P. Apostolidis	2:58
9.	"Kane Me Na Lioso" (Κάνε με να λιώσω; Make me melt)	Panos Falaras	M. Giaprakas	2:46
10.	"Melahrino Mou Feggari" (Μελαχροινό μου φεγγάρι; My brunette moon)	M. Doulianakis	P. Apostolidis	3:17
Total length:				33:43

== Music videos ==
- "Gela Mou" (Γέλα μου; Smile for me) (Directed by Kostas Kapetanidis)
- "Den Iparhi Tipota" (Δεν υπάρχει τίποτα; There is nothing) (Directed by Kostas Kapetanidis)
- "To Adiexodo" (feat. Giannis Parios) (Το αδιέξοδο; The deadlock) (Directed by Kostas Kapetanidis)

== Release history ==
Region	Date	Format	Label
Greece	June 3, 1994	LP, MC, CD	Minos EMI
Cyprus	June 3, 1994	LP, MC, CD	Minos EMI

== Credits and personnel ==
Personnel

- P. Apostolidis - music, bouzouki, tzoura, baglama
- Giannis Doras - background vocals
- M. Doulianakis - lyrics
- P. Dragoumis - electric bass
- P. Falara - lyrics
- B. Giagkoudis - guitar electric-acoustic
- M. Giaprakas - music
- Giannis Gkiouras - piano, keys, accordion, orchestration
- Vasilis Karras - music, lyrics, background vocals
- Z. Kasiaras - violin
- L. Komninos - lyrics
- Tony Kontaxakis - music, lyrics, orchestration
- Giannis Parios - vocals, background vocals
- Panagiotis Tsaousakis - percussion, background vocals
- Despina Vandi - vocals

Production

- Thodoris Hrisanthopoulos - transfer
- D. Margetakis - programming
- L. Neromiliotis - sound, remixing
- Achilleas Theofilou - production manager
- Konstantinos Theofilou - sound

Design

- Ntinos Diamantopoulos - photos
- Achilleas Haritos - styling
- Michalis Orfanos - print
- Vaso Papada - imagesetter
- Alkistis Spilioti - cover care

Credits adapted from the album's liner notes.
