= Afti Einai I Diafora Mas =

Afti Einai I Diafora Mas Αυτή Είναι Η Διαφορά Μας

Studio album by Despina Vandi
- Released: 6 October 2016
- Recorded: Bi-Kay studio Vox studio Track Factory Recording studio
- Genres: Pop, rock, contemporary laika
- Length: 46:28
- Language: Greek
- Label: Heaven Music
- Producer: Giannis Doxas

Despina Vandi chronology
De Me Stamatises (2014)	Afti Einai I Diafora Mas; Αυτή Είναι Η Διαφορά Μας (2016)

Singles from Afti Einai I Diafora Mas
- 1. "Mia Anasa Makria Sou" Released: 9 November 2015; 2. "To Maksilari" Released: 19 January 2015; 3. "Gia Kaki Mou Tihi" Released: 4 April 2016; 4. "Perasa Na Do" Released: 25 September 2016; 5. "Afti Ine I Diafora Mas" Released: 11 January 2017; 6. "Kati Pige Lathos" Released: 25 April 2017; 7. "Oti Thes Geniete Tora" Released: 19 June 2017

Afti Einai I Diafora Mas (Greek: Αυτή Είναι Η Διαφορά Μας; English: This Is Our Difference) is the eleventh studio album by Greek singer Despina Vandi. It was released on 6 October 2016 under the label Heaven Music and soon certified gold, selling over 6,000 units. The cover of the album was published by Heaven Music's webpage on 28 September. Videos and audio samples of the songs published on that webpage from 16 September to 6 October.

== Track listing ==
No.	Title	Lyrics	Music	Length
1.	"Afti Einai I Diafora Mas" (Αυτή είναι η διαφορά μας)	Aggeliki Makrinioti	Vasilis Gavriilidis	3:35
2.	"Gia Kaki Mou Tihi" (Για κακή μου τύχη)	Eleni Giannatsoulia	Takis Bougas	3:46
3.	"Perasa Na Do" (Πέρασα να δω)	Aggeliki Makrinioti	Vasilis Gavriilidis	3:39
4.	"Kati Pige Lathos" (Κάτι πήγε λάθος)	Eleni Giannatsoulia, Constantine Ganosis	Giannis Fraseris	3:44
5.	"Apo Avrio" (Από αύριο)	Nikos Sarris	Thanos Papanikolaou	4:04
6.	"Kita Me Kala" (Κοίτα με καλά)	Thanos Papanikolaou	Vasilis Gavriilidis	3:29
7.	"O,ti Thes Geniete Tora" (Ό,τι θες γεννιέται τώρα)	Nikos Moraitis	Dimitris Kontopoulos	3:07
8.	"Meine" (Μείνε)	Nikos Moraitis	Nikos Mertzanos	3:07
9.	"Mia Anasa Makria Sou" (Μια ανάσα μακριά σου)	Constantine Ganosis, Olga Vlahopoulou	Dimitris Kontopoulos	3:31
10.	"Mi Milas Gia Agapi" (Μη μιλάς για αγάπη)	Nikos Moraitis	Giorgos Karadimos	3:10
11.	"Ta Klidia" (Τα κλειδιά)	Stavros Stavrou, Constantine Ganosis	Vasilis Gavriilidis	3:35
12.	"Krima Pou Den Me Xehnas" (Κρίμα που δεν με ξεχνάς)	Yannis Doxas	Lazaros Titos	3:50
13.	"To Maxilari" (Το μαξιλάρι)	Nikos Moraitis	Vasilis Gavriilidis	3:51
Total length:				46:28

== Singles ==
"Mia Anasa Makria Sou"

It was released as a digital download on 9 November 2015 and is the lead single of the album. The video clip of the song was announced on 9 December 2015 from Heaven Music's YouTube Channel.

"To Maxilari"

The first presentation of the song was live in To Proino: Christougenna Mazi on 24 December 2015. It was released onto YouTube on 19 January 2016. The song was released as a digital download on 20 January 2016.

"Gia Kaki Mou Tihi"

It was released onto YouTube and as a digital download on 4 April 2016. The video clip was announced on 1 June 2016 from Heaven Music's YouTube Channel.

"Perasa Na Do"

It was released onto YouTube on 25 September 2016. The song was released as a digital download on 26 September 2016.

"Afti Einai I Diafora Mas"

It was released as a digital download on 11 January 2017.

"Kati Pige Lathos"

It was released as a digital download on 25 April 2017.

"Oti Thes Gennietai Tora"

It was released as a digital download on 19 June 2017. The video clip was announced on 28 August 2017 from Heaven Music's YouTube Channel.

== Release history ==
Region	Date	Label	Format	Ref
Various	6 October 2016	Heaven Music	CD, digital download	

== Credits ==
Credits adapted from liner notes.

=== Personnel ===
- Christos Bousdoukos – violin (2)
- Panayiotis Brakoulias – orchestration, programming, keyboards, backing vocals (10, 12) • guitar (2, 4, 10, 12) • baglama, cümbüş (12) • oud (2, 4) • säz (2, 4, 12)
- Akis Diximos – backing vocals (2, 4, 5, 9)
- Vasilis Gavriilidis – orchestration, programming, keyboards (1, 3, 6, 11, 13)
- Nikos Gkiouletzis – violin (11, 13)
- Antonis Gounaris – guitar (6, 13) • cura (1, 6, 13) • baglama, mandolin (13) • cümbüş (1, 6)
- Giannis Grigoriou – bass (1, 3, 6, 8, 10, 11, 12, 13)
- Sotiris Hasiotis – guitar (5, 9)
- Thanasis Hondros – bass (5)
- Katerina Kyriakou – backing vocals (2, 4, 9)
- Spyros Kontakis – guitar (1, 3, 11)
- Dimitris Kontopoulos – orchestration, programming, keyboards (7, 9)
- Giorgos Kostoglou – bass (9)
- Kostas Lainas – keyboards (10, 12) • accordion (10)
- Kostas Laskarakis – drums (5)
- Tasos Liberis – percussion (2, 10, 12)
- Alkis Misirlis – drums (1, 3, 9, 11, 13) • percussion (13)
- Andreas Mouzakis – drums (10, 12)
- Vasilis Nikolopoulos – keyboards (10, 12)
- Stavros Papayiannakopoulos – bouzouki, baglama (5)
- Elena Patroklou – backing vocals (1, 6)
- Stavros Pazarentzis – clarinet (3, 11)
- Michalis Porfiris – cello (5)
- Stefania Rizou – backing vocals (7)
- Gabriel Russell – orchestration, programming, keyboards, guitar (8)
- Giorgos Sousounis – violin (10, 12) • viola (10)
- Leonidas Tzitzos – orchestration, programming, keyboards (1, 2, 4, 5, 6, 11, 13)
- Evripidis Zemenidis – guitar (7)

=== Production ===
- Christos Alexandropoulos – styling
- Kyriakos Asteriou – engineer, mixing (1, 3, 6, 11, 13)
- Elena Athanasopoulou – artwork
- Aris Binis – engineer (2, 4, 5, 7, 8, 9, 10, 12) • mixing (2, 4, 5, 7, 8, 9)
- Babis Biris – engineer (10, 12)
- Panayiotis Brakoulias – engineer, mixing (10, 12)
- Giorgos Christodoulatos – mastering
- Yiannis Doxas – executive producer
- Vaso Nakopoulou – make up
- Vasilis Nikolopoulos – mixing (10, 12)
- Dimitris Skoulos – photographer
- Vasilis Stratigos – hair styling

== Charts ==
Afti Einai I Diafora Mas made its debut at number 2 on the 'Top 50 Greek Albums' charts by IFPI.

After two months, it was certified gold according to sales.

Chart	Providers	Peak position	Certification
Greek Albums Chart	IFPI	2	Gold
