= De Me Stamatises =

De Me Stamatises Δε με σταμάτησες

Studio album by Despina Vandi
- Released: 22 December 2014
- Genre: Pop, rock, modern laika
- Length: 36:12
- Language: Greek
- Label: Heaven Music
- Producer: Giorgos Kivellos

Despina Vandi chronology
Allaxa (2012)	De Me Stamatises; Δε με σταμάτησες (2014)	Afti Einai I Diafora Mas (2016)

Singles from De Me Stamatises
- 1. "Hano Esena" Released: 1 December 2013; 2. "Kalimera" Released: 20 April 2014; 3. "Ola Allazoun" Released: 4 June 2014; 4. "Kane Kati" Released: 19 October 2014; 5. "De Me Stamatises" Released: 22 December 2014; 6. "An Sou Leipo" Released: 7 May 2015

De Me Stamatises (trans. Δε Με Σταμάτησες; You Didn't Stop Me) is the tenth studio album by Greek singer Despina Vandi.

It was released on 22 December 2014 under the label Heaven Music and certified platinum, selling over 12,000 units. The cover of the album was published by Heaven Music's official Facebook page on 12 December 2014. The track-list and audio samples of the songs, published on the webpage of Proto Thema on 16 December 2014.

== Track listing ==
No.	Title	Lyrics	Music	Length
1.	"Kalimera" (Καλημέρα; Good Μorning)	Nikos Moraitis	Vasilis Gavriilidis	3:32
2.	"Kane Kati" (Κάνε Κάτι; Do Something)	Eleni Giannatsoulia	Giorgos Sabanis	4:06
3.	"De Me Stamatises" (Δε Με Σταμάτησες; You Didn't Stop Me)	Olga Vlachopoulou	Kiriakos Papadopoulos	3:55
4.	"Ti Simasia Ehei" (Τι Σημασία Έχει; What Does It Matter)	Olga Vlachopoulou	Vasilis Gavriilidis	3:48
5.	"Ola Allazoun" (Όλα Αλλάζουν; Everything Changes)	Vicky Gerothodorou	Dimitris Kontopoulos	3:00
6.	"Hano Esena" (Χάνω Εσένα; I Lose You)	Romy Papadea	Dimitris Kontopoulos	3:44
7.	"To Antio" (Το Αντίο; The Goodbye)	Vagia Kalantzi	Dimitris Kontopoulos	3:08
8.	"An Sou Leipo" (Αν Σου Λείπω; If You Miss Me)	Olga Vlachopoulou	Kiriakos Papadopoulos	3:27
9.	"Mono Pos Fevgeis Mi Mou Peis" (Μόνο Πως Φεύγεις Μη Μου Πεις; Only Don't Tell Me That You Leave)	Olga Vlachopoulou	Vasilis Gavriilidis	3:26
10.	"Mia Eikona... Hilies Lexeis" (Μια Eικόνα... Xίλιες Lέξεις; One Ιmage... Οne Τhousand Words)	Eleni Giannatsoulia	Giannis Fraseris	4:06
Total length:				36:12

== Singles and Music videos ==
"Hano Esena"

The single was released onto YouTube by Spicy Music on 1 December 2013. The song was released as a digital download on 2 December 2013 and is the lead single of the album. The video clip of the song was announced on 12 December 2013, from Spicy Music's YouTube Channel.

"Kalimera"

The first live presentation of the song was in «The Voice of Greece» on 20 April 2014. The single was released onto YouTube by Heaven Music on 25 April 2014. The song was released as a digital download on 28 April 2014.

"Ola Allazoun"

The song title was first announced on 4 June 2014, with a teaser video from Heaven Music's YouTube Channel. The next day uploaded a second teaser video and on 6 June 2014, uploaded a third one. The single was released onto YouTube by Heaven Music and released as a digital download on 9 June 2014.

"Kane Kati"

The single was released onto YouTube by Heaven Music on 19 October 2014. The song was released as a digital download on 20 October 2014. The video clip of the song was announced on 5 December 2014, from Heaven Music's YouTube Channel, preceded by two teaser videos, on 21 November 2014 and on 4 December 2014.

"An Sou Leipo"

The single was released onto YouTube by Heaven Music on 7 May 2015. The song was released as a digital download on 8 May 2015. The video clip of the song was announced too on 8 May 2015 from Heaven Music's YouTube channel.

== Release history ==
Region	Date	Label	Format	Version
Greece	22 December 2014	Heaven Music	CD, digital download	Original
Cyprus	22 December 2014	Heaven Music	CD, digital download	Original

== Charts ==
Chart	Providers	Peak position	Certification
Greek Albums Chart	IFPI	2	Platinum
Cypriot Albums Chart	-	-	

== Credits and Personnel ==
=== Personnel ===
Peter Aslanidis: guitars (tracks: 6)

Christos Avdelas: guitars, percussion (tracks: 1, 2, 4, 9, 10)

Antonis Dominos: backing vocals (tracks: 1)

Nikos Fournogerakis: guitars (tracks: 9, 10)

Antonis Gounaris: guitars (tracks: 3, 8) || mandolin (tracks: 3)

Giannis Grigoriou: bass (tracks: 3)

Vasilis Katsikis: baglama, bouzouki, guitars (tracks: 7)

Simos Kinalis: oud, säz (tracks: 8)

Dimitris Kontopoulos: keyboards, orchestration, programming (tracks: 5, 6, 7)

Krida: backing vocals (tracks: 2, 4, 10)

Giorgos Michailidis: violin (tracks: 8)

Andreas Mouzakis: drums (tracks: 3)

Stavros Pazarentsis: clarinet, ney (tracks: 8)

Stefania Rizou: backing vocals (tracks: 5, 6)

Soumka: keyboards, orchestration, programming (tracks: 1, 2, 4, 9, 10)

Leonidas Tzitzos: keyboards, orchestration, programming (tracks: 3, 8)

=== Production ===
Christos Avdelas (C&C studio): sound engineer (tracks: 1, 2, 4, 9, 10)

Aris Binis (Vox studio): mix engineer, sound engineer (tracks: 5, 6, 7)

Babis Biris (Bi-Kay studio): sound engineer (tracks: 8)

Giorgos Kivellos: executive producer

Ilias Lakkas (Odeon studio): mix engineer, sound engineer (tracks: 3, 8)

Anestis Psaradakos (Athens Mastering): mastering

Soumka (C&C studio): mix engineer (tracks: 1, 2, 4, 9, 10)

=== Cover ===
Giannis Bournias: photographer

Frank: art direction

Alexandra Katsaiti: styling

Vaso Nakopoulou: make up

Vasilis Stratigos: hair styling

Credits adapted from the album's liner notes.

== Official remixes ==
- 2014: Kalimera (Summer Dance Mix)
- 2015: Ola Allazoun (Remixed by Teo Tzimas & Petros Karras)
