= Deka Endoles =

Deka Entoles Δέκα Εντολές

Studio album by Despina Vandi
- Released: December 10, 1997
- Recorded: 1997, Studio Phase One, Studio Sierra
- Genres: Laïka, contemporary laïka, dance
- Length: 51:18
- Language: Greek
- Label: Minos EMI
- Producer: Phoebus

Despina Vandi chronology
Esena Perimeno (1996)	Deka Entoles; Δέκα Εντολές (1997)	Profities (1999)

Singles from Deka Entoles
- 1. "O Perittos" Released: 1997; 2. "Nihtolouloudo Mou" Released: 1997; 3. "Deka Entoles" Released: 1998; 4. "Thelo Na Se Ksehaso" Released: 1998; 5. "To Allo Miso" Released: 1998

Professional ratings
Review scores
Source	Rating
Allmusic	2.5/5 stars

Deka Entoles (Greek: Δέκα Εντολές; English: Ten orders) is the third studio album by Greek singer Despina Vandi. It was released in Greece in 1997 by Minos EMI and was her first album to be certified, reaching platinum status. This is the first album that Despina Vandi collaborated with popular composer Phoebus.

According to the Greek "Chart Show" and IFPI, the song "O Perittos" from the album is in the eighteenth position in the Top 30 with the most successful Greek pop songs of the 1990s.

== Track listing ==
No.	Title	Lyrics	Music	Length
1.	"Tis Kardias Mou Giatria" (Της καρδιάς μου γιατρειά; My heart's cure)	Phoebus	Phoebus	4:37
2.	"Kitakse Me" (Κοίταξε Με; Look at me)	Phoebus	Phoebus	3:32
3.	"Nihtolouloudo Mou" (Νυχτολούλουδο Μου; My night flower)	Phoebus	Phoebus	4:55
4.	"O Perittos" (Ο Περιττός; The redundant)	Phoebus	Phoebus	3:53
5.	"Outopia" (Ουτοπία; Utopia)	Phoebus	Phoebus	3:57
6.	"Eripio" (Ερείπιο; Ruin)	Phoebus	Phoebus	3:55
7.	"To Allo Miso" (Το Άλλο Μισό; The other half)	Phoebus	Phoebus	3:30
8.	"Ena Ki Ena Kanoun Dio" (Ένα Κι Ένα Κάνουν Δυο; One plus one equals two)	Phoebus	Phoebus	4:00
9.	"Thelo Na Se Ksehaso" (Θέλω Να Σε Ξεχάσω; I want to forget you)	Phoebus	Phoebus	4:43
10.	"Deka Entoles" (Δέκα Εντολές; Ten orders)	Phoebus	Phoebus	3:36
11.	"Prospatho" (Προσπαθώ; I'm trying)	Giannis Parios	Tony Kontaxakis	4:07
12.	"Metaniono" (Μετανιώνω; I regret)	Natalia Germanou	Tony Kontaxakis	3:14
13.	"Den Ise Edo" (Δεν είσαι εδώ; You're not here)	Giorgos Pavrianos	Tony Kontaxakis	3:56
Total length:				51:18

== Music videos ==
- "O Perittos" (Ο Περιττός; The redundant) (Director: Vaggelis Kalaitzis)
- "Outopia" (Ουτοπία; Utopia) (Director: Kostas Voridis)
- "Nihtolouloudo Mou" (Νυχτολούλουδο Μου; My night flower) (Director: Vaggelis Kalaitzis)
- "To Allo Miso" (Το Άλλο Μισό; The other half) (Director: Kostas Voridis)
- "Deka Entoles" (Δέκα Εντολές; Ten orders) (Director: Yorgos Lanthimos)
- "Thelo Na Se Ksehaso" (Θέλω Να Σε Ξεχάσω; I want to forget you) (Director: Kostas Voridis)

== Release history ==
Region	Date	Format	Label
Greece	December 10, 1997	MC, CD, Digital download	Minos EMI
Cyprus	December 10, 1997	MC, CD, Digital download	Minos EMI

== Chart performance ==
Chart	Providers	Peak position	Certification
Greek Albums Chart	IFPI Greece	1	2× Platinum
Cypriot Album Chart	Musical Paradise Top 10	1	Platinum

== Credits and personnel ==
Personnel

- Vasilis Diamantis - clarinet
- Pavlos Diamantopoulos - bass
- Erinta - background vocals
- Natalia Germanou - lyrics
- Antonis Gounaris - guitars, acoustic guitars
- Hakan - saz, oud
- Giorgos Hatzopoulos - guitars
- Giotis Kiourtsoglou - bass
- Katerina Kiriakou - background vocals
- Tony Kontaxakis - music, lyrics, orchestration, solo guitar, keyboards
- Fedon Lianoudakis - accordion
- Andreas Mouzakis - drums
- Giannis Mpithikotsis - bouzouki, tzoura, baglama
- Alex Panayi - background vocals
- Alekos Paraskevopoulos - bass
- Elias Paraskevopoulos - drums
- Giannis Parios - lyrics
- Giorgos Pavrianos - lyrics
- Phoebus - music, lyrics, orchestration, programming, keyboards, background vocals
- Giorgos Roilos - percussion
- Despina Vandi - vocals
- Thanasis Vasilopoulos - clarinet
- Nikos Zervas - keyboards
- Martha Zioga - background vocals

Production

- Thodoris Hrisanthopoulos - digital mastering
- Vaggelis Papadopoulos - sound, mix
- Giorgos Stampolis - sound
- Achilleas Theofilou - production manager
- Manolis Vlahos - sound, mix

Design

- Ntinos Diamantopoulos - photos
- Evi Sourmaidou - styling
- Krina Vronti - cover and insert design

Credits adapted from the album's liner notes.
