= C'est la Vie (Despina Vandi album) =

C'est La Vie

Studio album by Despina Vandi
- Released: 13 June 2010
- Studio: Power Music Studios
- Genre: Laïko, pop, pop rock
- Length: 45:51 (Original edition)
- Language: Greek, English
- Label: The Spicy Effect
- Producer: Phoebus

Despina Vandi chronology
10 Hronia Mazi (2007)	C'est La Vie (2010)	Allaksa (2012)

Singles from C'est La Vie
- 1. "Koritsi Prama" Released: 23 March 2010; 2. "Kommati Ap' Tin Kardia Sou" Released: 5 July 2010; 3. "Erota Theli I Zoi" Released: 13 September 2010; 4. "Gi' Alli Mia Fora" Released: 24 February 2011

C'est La Vie (English: That's life) is the eighth studio album released by Greek singer Despina Vandi. Initially, the album was distributed exclusively via a bundling with the newspaper "Real News" on 13 June 2010, marks the first LP released on label "The Spicy Effect", as well as her first studio album of new material since 2007's 10 Hronia Mazi. The album contains eleven songs, composed and produced entirely by Phoebus, with Zoi Grypari having written the lyrics on two songs, Vaggelis Konstandinidis on one song, and one song which is a co-production with a member of German band Schiller, Christopher von Deylen. The album was released via magazine stores of sale on 24 June 2010 in a one disc edition featuring five additional remixes and a fan magazine dedicated to Despina Vandi. Also, was released via traditional points of sale on 29 June 2010 in a double disc edition featuring seven additional remixes, including the five remixes from the second edition

== Background ==
During the shooting of the music video at Diogenes Studio for the first single "Koritsi Prama, Part 1" in March 2010, Vandi announced that she intended to release a new album in June 2010.

The photo shoot for the album took place on 26 May 2010. Speaking about the album at the photo shoot, Vandi stated that it will feature a range of music styles. Vandi added that she will be embarking on a tour around Greece during the summer in support of the album.

On 2 June 2010, sponsor Love Radio revealed the name and cover art of the album on their website.

== Release and promotion ==
The single disc edition of the album, which contains eleven tracks, released to an exclusive distribution via the newspaper "Real News" bundled with its publication of 13 June 2010. On 24 June 2010, the album was released via magazine stores in a one disc edition featuring five additional remixes and a 36-page fan magazine dedicated to Despina Vandi. On 29 June 2010, the album was distributed via traditional points of sale with a discounted fixed price, in a double disc edition featuring seven additional remixes, including the five remixes from the second edition.
On 23 December 2010, the Magazine edition of CD re-released via TV magazine "Tiletheatis" #1183 (25–31 December 2010).

For the promotion of the album, Vandi gave a series of radio interviews leading up to its release. In June 2010, Vandi performed "Kommati Ap' Tin Kardia Sou" as well as a snippet of "Koritsi Prama" at the MAD Video Music Awards. Vandi also gave an exclusive interview on Dromos FM on 17 June and on Sok FM on 30 June 2010.

== Singles ==
"Koritsi Prama"

Despina Vandi released the first single of the album, "Koritsi Prama", in two parts. Part 1 was released to radio stations on 22 March 2010, followed by a digital release on 27 April 2010. The music video, directed by Kostas Kapetanidis, was shot at Diogenis Studio on 22 March 2010, and released on 13 April 2010, making its debut on Star Channel. Part 2 of "Koritsi Prama" was released to radio stations on 14 May 2010. The song shares the same music composition as its predecessor, however, it has altered lyrics.

"Kommati Ap' Tin Kardia Sou"

"Kommati Ap' Tin Kardia Sou" was released to radio stations on 7 June 2010. The song premiered on Love Radio during an interview by Despina Vandi on the same date. The official music video of the song was broadcast on 9 June 2010 on Star Channel, and was reviewed positively by radio producer Michael Tsaousopoulos. The video clip of the song was released on 5 July 2010.

"Erota Theli I Zoi"

The song premiered on the website of Star Channel, a day before the album's release. Vandi revealed in her interview on Sok FM that the song will be the third single from the album. The single was released to radio stations on 13 September 2010. The music video of the song and a remix version with Ipohthonios were uploaded on 19 October 2010 to Spicy's YouTube Channel. The song charted at number 53 on the 2011 year-end Greek Airplay Chart.

=== Other notable tracks ===
"Gi' Alli Mia Fora"

"Gi' Alli Mia Fora" was released to radio stations on 11 June 2010, premiering on Real FM during an interview with Vandi. The official promo video clip of the song was broadcast on 11 June on Star Channel, where it was reviewed by radio producer and songwriter Posidonas Giannopoulos. The song charted at number 29 on the year-end Greek Airplay Chart.

"Sunday"

Vandi once again collaborated with German band Schiller on the song "Sunday". It was her second collaboration with Schiller following 2008's "Destiny". The song was released in Greece on 19 May upon the band's release of their studio album Atemlos in Greece.

== Commercial performance ==
Real News, the newspaper that exclusively distributed the album upon release, sold 103,020 units of its 13 June 2010 publication that included the album. This sales figure represented an increase in unit sales by 32%, or 25,160 units, compared to the previous week. Heaven Music awarded the album multi-platinum certification, although this was based on the sales of the magazine alone and not on the record shop sales

== Track listing ==
Original edition
No.	Title	Lyrics	Music	Length
1.	"Koritsi Prama (Part 1)" (Κορίτσι πράμα (Part 1); Girl thing (Part 1))	Phoebus	Phoebus	4:22
2.	"Pai Pai" (Πάει πάει; Going, going)	Phoebus	Phoebus	4:23
3.	"Kommati Ap' Tin Kardia Sou" (Κομμάτι απ' την καρδιά σου; Piece from your heart)	Phoebus	Phoebus	4:19
4.	"Anapliromatikos" (Αναπληρωματικός; Alternate)	Phoebus	Phoebus	4:33
5.	"Ke Pirovolises" (Και πυροβόλησες; And you shot)	Zoi Grypari	Phoebus	4:30
6.	"Erota Theli I Zoi" (Έρωτα θέλει η ζωή; Life wants love)	Zoi Grypari	Phoebus	3:48
7.	"Ginekes Dinates" (Γυναίκες δυνατές; Strong women)	Vaggelis Konstandinidis	Phoebus	3:12
8.	"Gi' Alli Mia Fora" (Γι' άλλη μια φορά; For one more time)	Phoebus	Phoebus	4:21
9.	"C' est La Vie" (C' est la vie; That's life)	Phoebus	Phoebus	3:58
10.	"Sunday (with Schiller)"	Phoebus, Christopher von Deylen	Phoebus, Christopher von Deylen	4:01
11.	"Koritsi Prama (Part 2)" (Κορίτσι πράμα (Part 2); Girl thing (Part 2))	Phoebus	Phoebus	4:19
Total length:				45:51

Magazine edition
No.	Title	Lyrics	Music	Length
1.	"Koritsi Prama (Part 1)" (Κορίτσι πράμα (Part 1); Girl thing (Part 1))	Phoebus	Phoebus	4:22
2.	"Pai Pai" (Πάει πάει; Go go)	Phoebus	Phoebus	4:23
3.	"Kommati Ap' Tin Kardia Sou" (Κομμάτι απ' την καρδιά σου; Piece from your heart)	Phoebus	Phoebus	4:19
4.	"Anapliromatikos" (Αναπληρωματικός; Alternate)	Phoebus	Phoebus	4:33
5.	"Ke Pirovolises" (Και πυροβόλησες; And you shot)	Zoi Grypari	Phoebus	4:30
6.	"Erota Theli I Zoi" (Έρωτα θέλει η ζωή; Life wants love)	Zoi Grypari	Phoebus	3:48
7.	"Ginekes Dinates" (Γυναίκες δυνατές; Strong women)	Vaggelis Konstandinidis	Phoebus	3:12
8.	"Gi' Alli Mia Fora" (Γι' άλλη μια φορά; For one more time)	Phoebus	Phoebus	4:21
9.	"C' est La Vie" (C' est la vie; That's life)	Phoebus	Phoebus	3:58
10.	"Sunday (with Schiller)"	Phoebus, Christopher von Deylen	Phoebus, Christopher von Deylen	4:01
11.	"Koritsi Prama (Part 2)" (Κορίτσι πράμα (Part 2); Girl thing (Part 2))	Phoebus	Phoebus	4:19
12.	"Koritsi Prama Hot Mix" (Κορίτσι πράμα Hot Mix; Girl thing Hot Mix)	Phoebus	Phoebus	6:11
13.	"Koritsi Prama Rembetiko Mix" (Κορίτσι πράμα Ρεμπέτικο Mix; Girl thing Rembetiko Mix)	Phoebus	Phoebus	4:14
14.	"Gi' Alli Mia Fora (Almond Gallery Remix)" (Γι' άλλη μια φορά (Almond Gallery Remix); For one more time (Almond Gallery Remix))	Phoebus	Phoebus	5:04
15.	"Sunday Exclusive Version"	Phoebus, Christopher von Deylen	Phoebus, Christopher von Deylen	4:00
16.	"Kommati Ap' Tin Kardia Sou (Original Version)" (Κομμάτι απ' την καρδιά σου (Original Version); Piece from your heart (Original Version))	Phoebus	Phoebus	6:14
Total length:				71:29

Retail bonus disc
No.	Title	Lyrics	Music	Length
1.	"Koritsi Prama (MAD Version)" (Κορίτσι πράμα (MAD Version); Girl thing (MAD Version))	Phoebus	Phoebus	3:08
2.	"Gi' Alli Mia Fora (Almond Gallery Remix)" (Γι' άλλη μια φορά (Almond Gallery Remix); For one more time (Almond Gallery Remix))	Phoebus	Phoebus	5:04
3.	"Sunday Exclusive Version" (Remix by Christopher von Deylen)	Phoebus, Christopher von Deylen	Phoebus, Christopher von Deylen	4:00
4.	"Kommati Ap' Tin Kardia Sou (Original Version)" (Κομμάτι απ' την καρδιά σου (Original Version); Piece from your heart (Original Version))	Phoebus	Phoebus	6:14
5.	"Gi' Alli Mia Fora (Slow Version)" (Γι' άλλη μια φορά (Slow Version); For one more time (Slow Version))	Phoebus	Phoebus	4:39
6.	"Koritsi Prama Hot Mix" (Κορίτσι πράμα Hot Mix; Girl thing Hot Mix)	Phoebus	Phoebus	6:11
7.	"Koritsi Prama Rembetiko Mix" (Κορίτσι πράμα Rembetiko Mix; Girl thing Rembetiko Mix)	Phoebus	Phoebus	4:14
Total length:				33:30

== Release history ==
Region	Date	Label	Format	Version
Greece	13 June 2010	The Spicy Effect	CD, digital download	Original (Real News)
Greece	24 June 2010	The Spicy Effect	CD, digital download	Magazine edition
Greece	29 June 2010	The Spicy Effect	CD, digital download	Double CD edition
Cyprus	29 June 2010	The Spicy Effect	CD, digital download	Double CD edition

== Personnel ==
Credits adapted from the album's liner notes.

- Victoria Chalkitis – background vocals
- Alexandros Chrysidis – additional guitars
- Akis Diximos – second vocals
- Spiros Dorizas – drums
- Antonis Gounaris – orchestration, programming, guitars (classic, acoustic, twelve-strings), tzoura, baglama, keyboards, accordion
- Zoi Grypari – lyrics
- Giorgos Hatzopoulos – guitars (acoustics, twelve-strings, electrics)
- Telis Kafkas – bass
- Stella Kalli – background vocals
- Giannis Kifonidis – accordion
- Vaggelis Konstantinidis – lyrics
- Trifonas Koutsourelis – programming, keyboards
- Spiros Lambrou's Children's Choir (Penelope Skalkotou, Rafaela Ntanou, Emilia Papapetrou, Aggelina Antoniou, Eleni Souma, Eleni Vogiatzi, Elena Ntintila)
- Giannis Lionakis – orchestration, guitars (acoustic, twelve-strings, electric), lute, baglama, keyboards, programming, bouzouki
- Michaella – background vocals
- Vaggelis Mpetzios – clarinet
- Arsenis Nasis – percussion
- Vasilis Nikolopoulos – orchestration, programming, keyboards, drums
- Phoebus – music, lyrics, orchestration, programming, keyboards
- Giorgos Roilos – percussion
- Elisavet Spanou – background vocals
- Despina Vandi – vocals
- Christopher von Deylen (Schiller) – music, lyrics, orchestration, programming, keyboards

Production

- Alexandros Chrysidis – sound
- Thodoris Hrisanthopoulos – mastering
- Giannis Kifonidis – recording instruments, mix
- Vasilis Nikolopoulos – mix
- Phoebus – mix
- Vaggelis Siapatis – production, sound, computer editing

Design

- Dimitris Giannetos – grooming
- Alexandra Katsaiti – styling
- Thodoris Lalagkas – art direction
- Dimitris Skoulos – cover photos

== See also ==
- Despina Vandi discography
