= Esena Perimeno =

Esena Perimeno Εσένα Περιμένω

Studio album by Despina Vandi
- Released: April 5, 1996
- Recorded: Studio Polysound
- Genre: Laïka, contemporary laïka
- Length: 46:50
- Language: Greek
- Label: Minos EMI
- Producer: Achileas Theofilou

Despina Vandi chronology
Gela Mou (1994)	Esena Perimeno; Εσένα Περιμένω (1996)	Deka Endoles (1997)

Singles from Esena Perimeno
- 1. "Efiges" Released: 1996; 2. "Den Petheni I Agapi" Released: 1996; 3. "Esena Perimeno" Released: 1996

Esena Perimeno (Greek: Εσένα Περιμένω; English: I'm waiting for you) is the second studio album by Greek singer Despina Vandi. It was released in Greece in 1996 by Minos EMI and according to Despina Vandi it sold 18,000 copies.

== Track listing ==
No.	Title	Lyrics	Music	Length
1.	"Enoha Vradia" (Ένοχα βράδυα; Guilty nights)	Christoforos Mpalampanidis	Tony Kontaxakis	4:33
2.	"Den Petheni I Agapi..." (Δεν πεθαίνει η αγάπη...; Love doesn't die…)	Lambis Livieratos	Tony Kontaxakis	3:56
3.	"Esena Perimeno" (Εσένα περιμένω; I'm waiting for you)	Natalia Germanou	Tony Kontaxakis	4:13
4.	"Efiges" (Έφυγες; You left)	Lambis Livieratos	Tony Kontaxakis	3:34
5.	"Erotas Alitis" (Έρωτας αλήτης; Scamp love)	Christoforos Mpalampanidis	Ercan Saatçi	3:13
6.	"Proti Nihta" (Πρώτη νύχτα; First night)	Christoforos Mpalampanidis	Christos Nikolopoulos	3:08
7.	"Enohos (Ase Me)" (Ένοχος (Άσε Με); Guilty (Leave me))	Christoforos Mpalampanidis	Christos Nikolopoulos	3:21
8.	"Pos Mperdeftika" (Πως μπερδεύτηκα; How am I confused?)	Harry Varthakouris	Harry Varthakouris	2:47
9.	"Den Aniko Se Kanenan" (Δεν ανήκω σε κανέναν; I don't belong to anyone)	Panos Falaras	Thanasis Kargidis	3:14
10.	"Ke T' Oniro Egine Efialtis" (Και τ' όνειρο έγινε εφιάλτης; And the dream became a nightmare)	Pantelis Kanarakis	Tony Kontaxakis	4:05
11.	"I Antres Theloun Pedema" (Οι άντρες θέλουν παίδεμα; Men need pestering)	Natalia Germanou	Tony Kontaxakis	3:27
12.	"As Tous Na Lene" (Ας τους να λένε; Let them say)	Tony Kontaxakis, Christoforos Mpalampanidis	Tony Kontaxakis	3:15
13.	"Emis I Dio Malonoume" (Εμείς οι δυο μαλώνουμε; We two are fighting)	Christoforos Mpalampanidis	Christos Nikolopoulos	4:04
Total length:				46:50

== Music videos ==
- "Efiges" (Directed by Kostas Kapetanidis)
- "Den Petheni I Agapi" (Directed by Kostas Kapetanidis)
- "Esena Perimeno" (Directed by Giorgos Gavalos)

== Release history ==
Region	Date	Format	Label
Greece	April 5, 1996	LP, MC, CD	Minos EMI
Cyprus	April 5, 1996	LP, MC, CD	Minos EMI

== Credits and personnel ==
Personnel

- Panos Falaras - lyrics
- Ntinos Georgountzos - keys
- Natalia Germanou - lyrics
- Antonis Gounaris - guitars, orchestration
- Nikos Hatzopoulos - violin
- Pantelis Kanarakis - lyrics
- Thanasis Kargidis - music
- Tony Kontaxakis - music, lyrics, background vocals, orchestration
- Giorgos Kostoglou - electric bass
- Antonis Koulouris - drums
- Lambis Livieratos - lyrics
- D. Manakidis - background vocals
- Christoforos Mpalampanidis - music, lyrics
- Giannis Mpithikotsis - bouzouki, tzoura, baglama
- Christos Nikolopoulos - music
- Giorgos Roilos - percussion
- Ercan Saatci pm - music, lyrics
- Stefanos Stefanopoulos - saxophone
- Kiriakos Tsolakis - accordion
- Despina Vandi - vocals, background vocals
- Harry Varthakouris - music, lyrics, background vocals, orchestration

Production

- Thodoris Hrisanthopoulos - transfer
- Giannis Ioannidis - mastering
- Achilleas Theofilou - production manager
- Konstantinos Theofilou - sound engineer, mixing
- Harry Varthakouris - production manager

Design

- Kostas Avgoulis - styling
- Manolis Kalampokis - photos
- Polina Katsouli - make up
- Spiros Lieros - hairdressing
- Alkistis Spilioti - cover care

Credits adapted from the album's liner notes.
