= Allaxa =

Allaxa Άλλαξα

Studio album by Despina Vandi
- Released: 27 April 2012
- Recorded: Power Music studio
- Genre: Pop, modern laika, rock
- Length: 44:13
- Language: Greek
- Label: The Spicy Effect
- Producer: Phoebus

Despina Vandi chronology
C'est La Vie (2010)	Allaxa; Άλλαξα (2012)	De Me Stamatises (2014)

Singles from Allaxa
- 1. "Mou 'Heis Perasei" Released: 24 November 2011; 2. "Girismata" Released: 13 December 2011; 3. "To Nisi" Released: 22 April 2012; 4. "T' Asteri Mou" Released: 18 May 2012; 5. "Katalavaino" Released: 18 September 2012; 6. "Mou Ftiahneis Ti Mera" Released: 26 November 2012; 7. "To Ligo Sou Na Zo" Released: 27 November 2012; 8. "Allaxa" Released: 28 November 2012

Allaxa (Greek: Άλλαξα; English: I Changed) is the ninth studio album by Greek singer Despina Vandi. It was released on 27 April 2012 by The Spicy Effect and received double-platinum certification, selling over 30,000 units. It was produced and written by Phoebus and constitute the last cooperation of them. On 26 April 2012, Despina revealed on her Twitter account that after the release of the singles Mou 'Heis Perasei and Girismata, she will release a full-length album.

== Promotion ==
Since now, Despina and her label consider to promote the CD through internet and iTunes. Tiletheatis, the famous Greek showbiz weekly magazine is a big sponsor for the album. In the same day of the release, the magazine will offer as a gift the new album.

== Singles ==
Eight songs was officially released as singles to radio stations with music videos, except the songs "T' Asteri Mou", "Mou Ftiahneis Ti Mera", "To Ligo Sou Na Zo" and "Allaxa", and gained massive airplay.

=== "Mou 'Heis Perasei" ===
The title of "Mou 'His Perasi" (Greek: Μου 'Χεις Περάσει) was announced on 17 November 2011 with a teaser video from Spicy Music's YouTube Channel. Four days later, on November 21, 2011, a second teaser video was uploaded with some lyrics of the song and the release date. On November 23, 2011, Vandi, in cooperation with the radio station Rithmos 949, presented her new song in the club-restaurant DC (Dream City), at a party for listeners of the station. The single was released to Greek radio on November 24, 2011, first from the radio station Rithmos 949 and uploaded onto YouTube by Spicy Music. The song was released as a digital download on December 13, 2011.

It was written by Gavrilis Mosas and produced by Phoebus.

Vandi was seen filming the music video for "Mou 'His Perasi" in Agrinio, on December 1, 2011. On December 1, Vandi posted on her Twitter account: "Difficult to wake up at 6 00 to prepare for a shooting! When specifically have slept at 3 00!" and added "Mou his perasi... Now! " Twitpic. The same day, the image maker Alexandra Katsaiti and the hair and make-up artist Dimitris Giannetos, uploaded onto Twitter some photos from backstage.

=== "Girismata" ===
The song is a laiko rumba reminding Despina since 2000's. The single was released on 13 December 2011 at radio stations. On 7 March 2012 was released and the official video clip, directed by Kostas Kapetanidis. Her image maker, Alexandra Katsaiti, uploaded onto Twitter and Facebook some photos from backstage.

=== "To Nisi" ===
The song is a laiko/traditional tsifteteli in which there was a zither solo. The single was released on 22 April 2012 at radio stations, as a precursor of the upcoming album. On 7 May 2012, Despina arrived to Skiathos to film the video clip which released on 13 June 2012, directed by Kostas Kapetanidis.

=== "Katalavaino" ===
The song is a slow pop ballad which was released at radio stations on 18 September 2012. On 7 January 2013 was released and the video clip, directed by Pillow Talk.

== Tracklist ==
All tracks are written by Phoebus.

No.	Title	Lyrics	Music	Length
1.	"To Nisi" (Το Νησί; The Island)			4:13
2.	"T' Asteri Mou" (Τ' Αστέρι Μου; My Star)	Eleni Giannatsoulia		2:56
3.	"Mou 'Heis Perasei" (Μου 'Χεις Περάσει; I've Over You)		Gavriel Mosas	4:23
4.	"Katalavaino" (Καταλαβαίνω; I Understand)	Eleni Giannatsoulia		3:41
5.	"Mou Ftiahneis Ti Mera" (Μου Φτιάχνεις Τη Μέρα; You Make My Day)	Eleni Giannatsoulia		3:29
6.	"Ligo Psema" (Λίγο Ψέμα; A Bit Of A Lie)		Gavriel Mosas	3:50
7.	"To Ligo Sou Na Zo" (Το Λίγο Σου Να Ζω; A Small Part Of Yours To Live)	Olga Vlahopoulou		4:26
8.	"Girismata" (Γυρίσματα; Turning)			3:13
9.	"M' Ena Antio" (Μ' Ένα Αντίο; With A Goodbye)	Olga Vlahopoulou		3:16
10.	"Pali Epistrefo" (Πάλι Επιστρέφω; I'm Back Again)	Olga Vlahopoulou		3:36
11.	"Ela Konta" (Έλα Κοντά; Come Closer)	Vaggelis Kostantinidis		3:55
12.	"Allaxa" (Άλλαξα; I Changed)			3:17
Total length:				44:13

== Credits ==
Credits adapted from liner notes.

=== Personnel ===
- Eleanna Azouki – backing vocals (2, 5, 8)
- Alexandros Bosinakos – backing vocals (2, 5, 8)
- Christos Bousdoukos – violin, cello (1)
- George Chatzopoulos – guitars (1–12)
- Nikos Chatzopoulos – violin (8)
- Simela Christopoulou – backing vocals (5)
- Akis Diximos – backing vocals (2, 5, 8) / second vocal (1, 2, 3, 4, 6, 7, 8, 9, 10, 11, 12)
- Kostas Doxas – backing vocals (2, 8)
- George Florakis – backing vocals (2)
- Charis Galanis – backing vocals (5)
- Antonis Gounaris – orchestration, programming, keyboards, bouzouki (12) / bass (8) / guitars (3) / cura, cümbüş (2) / mandolin (3, 10) / ukulele (10)
- Telis Kafkas – bass (3, 6, 9, 10)
- Alexandra Lykoudi – backing vocals (1, 2, 8)
- Vivian Nikolaidi – backing vocals (1, 2, 5, 8)
- Vasilis Nikolopoulos – orchestration, programming, keyboards (1–11)
- Thymios Papadopoulos – clarinet (5) / flute (2, 4, 6, 7) / fife (2, 4)
- Spyros Patapis – lute (1)
- Phoebus – orchestration (1–12) / programming (1, 3, 4, 7, 11) / keyboards (1–11)
- Lefteris Pouliou – saxophone (11)
- George Roilos – percussion (1, 2, 8)
- Rozanna Tseliou – backing vocals (1)
- Stella Valasi – zither (1)
- Despina Vandi – second vocal (9)

=== Production ===
- Kostas Avgoulis – photographer
- Dimitris Yiannetos – hair styling, make up
- Alexandra Katsaiti – styling
- Thodoris Lalagkas – artwork
- Vasilis Nikolopoulos – mix engineer
- Phoebus – executive producer, mix engineer
- Vaggelis Siapatis – co-producer, sound engineer, editing
- Paul Stefanidis (Viking Lounge studio) – mastering

== Release ==
Region	Date	Label	Format	Version
Greece	27 April 2012	The Spicy Effect	CD / Digital Download	Original
Greece	26 April 2012	The Spicy Effect	CD / Digital Download	Tiletheatis edition
Cyprus	27 April 2012	The Spicy Effect	CD / Digital Download	Original

== Charts and certification ==
=== Album ===
Chart	Providers	Certification
Greek Albums Chart	IFPI	2×Platinum
Cypriot Albums Chart	-	Platinum

=== Singles ===
"Mou 'His Perasi"	Provider	Peak position
Greek Airplay Charts (Greek only songs)	Media Inspector	1
Greek Airplay Chart	Media Inspector	5
