= Koritsi Prama =

"Koritsi Prama, Part 1"
- Part 1 digital single cover

Single by Despina Vandi

from the album C'est La vie
- Released: March 22, 2010
- Recorded: 2010
- Genre: Pop, rock, dance
- Length: 4:22 (Part 1); 4:18 (Part 2)
- Label: The Spicy Effect
- Songwriter: Phoebus
- Producer: Phoebus

Despina Vandi minor singles chronology
"Iparhi Zoi" (2009)	"Koritsi Prama, Part 1" (2010)

"Koritsi Prama" (Greek: Κορίτσι Πράμα; English: Girl Thing) is the two part first single from Greek singer Despina Vandi's eighth studio album C'est La vie (2010). Written by Phoebus, Part 1 was released as a radio single on March 22, 2010, and marks Vandi's first release on The Spicy Effect. On April 27, 2010, the song was released as a digital single.

Part 2 was released to radios on May 14, 2010, by Dromos FM, followed by a June 2 digital release. The song features the same music and chorus, however, the lyrics are different.

== Track listing ==
- "Koritsi Prama, Part 1" (Κορίτσι Πράμα, Part 1; Girl thing) – 4:22
- "Koritsi Prama, Part 2" (Κορίτσι Πράμα, Part 2; Girl thing) – 4:18

== Music video ==
The music video for the song was shot at Diogenis Studio on March 22, 2010. On April 1 was released a teaser of the video clip exclusive from the music channel MAD TV. On April 13 was released the video clip, exclusive coverage through the main news of Star Channel. The director from video clip was Kostas Kapetanidis and the main idea from Phoebus.

== Charts ==
Chart	Provider	Peak position
Greek Airplay Chart	Music Control	4
Greek Airplay Chart	Media Inspector	2
