= Profities =

Profiteies Προφητείες

Studio album by Despina Vandi
- Released: 8 December 1999
- Recorded: Phase One studio
- Genres: Contemporary laika, pop, electronic
- Length: 1:09:49
- Language: Greek
- Label: Minos EMI
- Producer: Achilleas Theofilou

Despina Vandi chronology
Deka Endoles (1997)	Profiteies; Προφητείες (1999)	Gia (2001)

Singles from Profiteies
- 1. "Spania" Released: December 17, 1998; 2. "Oute ena efharisto" Released: February 1999; 3. "Profities" Released: December 8, 1999; 4. "A pa pa" Released: February 2000; 5. "Giatriko" Released: April 2000; 6. "To koritsaki sou" Released: June 2000; 7. "Sta 'dosa ola" Released: August 2000

Professional ratings
Review scores
Source	Rating
Allmusic	2.5/5 stars

Profiteies (trans. Προφητείες; Prophecies) is the fourth studio album by Greek singer Despina Vandi.

It was released in Greece οn 8 December 1999 by Minos EMI and in Arabian countries by EMI Arabia in 2000. It was certified gold the day of its release and went platinum in two days, selling 70,000 copies. It became the best selling album by a female artist for 1999. In 2000, it sold 80,000 copies plus and managed to become triple-platinum, selling 150,000 copies overall. Also, it stayed at number 1 of the IFPI charts for five weeks. It also became triple-platinum in Cyprus, selling 20,000 copies.

The song "Sta 'dosa ola" from the album was ranked by Alpha TV show Chart Show as the 24th most successful Greek love song in Greece during 1980–2009, as well as the sixth most successful break-up song from 1980 to 2010.

== Track listing ==
All music is composed by Phoebus.

No.	Title	Lyrics	Length
1.	"Akros tolmiro" (Άκρως τολμηρό)	Phoebus	3:36
2.	"Profiteies" (Προφητείες)	Phoebus	4:26
3.	"To koritsaki sou" (Το κοριτσάκι σου)	Phoebus	4:10
4.	"Kleinomai" (Κλείνομαι)	Phoebus	4:55
5.	"Fisa ageri" (Φύσα αγέρι)	Phoebus	4:40
6.	"Giatriko" (Γιατρικό)	Phoebus	4:15
7.	"Parata me" (Παράτα με)	Phoebus	4:08
8.	"A pa pa" (Α πα πα)	Phoebus	3:12
9.	"Sta 'dosa ola" (Στα 'δωσα όλα)	Phoebus	5:26
10.	"Rotao poia" (Ρωτάω ποια)	Phoebus	4:19
11.	"Eteronima" (Ετερώνυμα)	Phoebus	4:05
12.	"Horis esena" (Χωρίς εσένα)	Giannis Parios	4:42
13.	"Xenodoheio" (Ξενοδοχείο)	Phoebus	4:03
14.	"Diakoptaki" (Διακοπτάκι)	Phoebus	4:07
15.	"Spania" (Σπάνια)	Phoebus	4:39
16.	"Oute ena efharisto" (Ούτε ένα ευχαριστώ)	Phoebus	5:06
Total length:			1:09:49

== Singles and music videos ==
- "Spania" ("Σπάνια") (Directed by Kostas Kapetanidis)
- "Oute ena efharisto" ("Ούτε ένα ευχαριστώ") (Directed by Dimitris Sotas)
- "Profities" ("Προφητείες") (Directed by Giorgos Gavalos)
- "A pa pa" ("Α πα πα") (Directed by)
- "Giatriko" ("Γιατρικό") (Directed by Kostas Kapetanidis)
- "Diakoptaki" ("Διακοπτάκι") (Directed by Giorgos Gavalos)
- "To koritsaki sou" ("Το κοριτσάκι σου") (Directed by Kostas Kapetanidis)
- "Sta 'dosa ola" ("Στα 'δωσα όλα") (Directed by Kostas Kapetanidis)

== Release history ==
Region	Date	Format	Label	Version
Greece	8 December 1999	CD, Digital download	Minos EMI	Original
Greece	8 December 1999	CD	Minos EMI	Collector's edition
Cyprus	8 December 1999	CD, Digital download	Minos EMI	Original
Turkey	2000	CD, MC	Minos EMI	Turkish edition

== Charts ==
Chart	Providers	Peak position	Certification
Greek Albums Chart	IFPI	1	3× Platinum
Cypriot Album Chart	Musical Paradise Top 10	1	3× Platinum

== Credits and personnel ==
Credits adapted from the album's liner notes.

Personnel

- Christina Argiri: backing vocals (tracks: 15)
- Hakan Bingolou: säz (tracks: 2, 4, 8, 14, 15)
- Giannis Bithikotsis: baglama, bouzouki (tracks: 3, 5, 9, 16) || mandolin (tracks: 7, 16) || tzoura (tracks: 3, 4, 5, 14)
- Giorgos Chatzopoulos: guitars (tracks: 1, 2, 3, 4, 5, 6, 7, 8, 9, 10, 11, 12, 13, 14, 15, 16)
- Achilleas Dantilis: strings (tracks: 8)
- Pavlos Diamantopoulos: backing vocals (tracks: 2, 3, 4, 5, 7, 8, 9, 12, 13, 14, 15, 16)
- Akis Diximos: backing vocals (tracks: 1, 2, 8, 10, 11, 13) || second vocal (tracks: 2, 3, 4, 9, 14)
- Kostas Doxas: backing vocals (tracks: 1, 2, 8, 10, 11, 13)
- Panagiotis Drakopoulos: saxophone (tracks: 11, 13)
- Katerina Kiriakou: backing vocals (tracks: 1, 2, 4, 6, 8, 10, 11, 13, 15) || second vocal (tracks: 5)
- Fedon Lionoudakis: accordion (tracks: 3, 5, 9, 14)
- Andreas Mouzakis: backing vocals (tracks: 2, 3, 4, 5, 7, 8, 9, 12, 13, 14, 15, 16)
- Alex Panagis: backing vocals (tracks: 1, 2, 8, 10, 11, 13, 15)
- Phoebus: keyboards, programming (tracks: 1, 2, 4, 6, 8, 10, 11, 13, 14, 15) || orchestration (all tracks) || strings (tracks: 8)
- Giorgos Roilos: percussion (tracks: 2, 3, 4, 5, 8, 9, 13, 14, 15)
- Thanasis Vasilopoulos: clarinet (tracks: 2, 8, 15) || ney (tracks: 15)
- Alexandros Vourazelis: keyboards, programming (tracks: 3, 5, 7, 9, 12, 16)
- Nikos Zervas: keyboards (tracks: 15)
- Martha Zioga: backing vocals (tracks: 1, 2, 4, 6, 8, 10, 11, 13)

Production

- Thodoris Chrisanthopoulos (Fabelsound): mastering
- Vaggelis Siapatis: sound engineer
- Giorgos Stampolis: editing, sound engineer
- Achilleas Theofilou: executive producer
- Manolis Vlachos: mix engineer, sound engineer
- Alexandros Vourazelis: sound engineer

Artwork

- Katia Dimopoulou: art direction
- Panos Kallitsis: hair styling, make up
- Manolis Kalogeropoulos: photographer
- Maria Pitsokou: photo processing
- Tasos Vrettos: photographer
