= Despina Vandi =

Greek singer (born 1969)

Despina Vandi Δέσποινα Βανδή
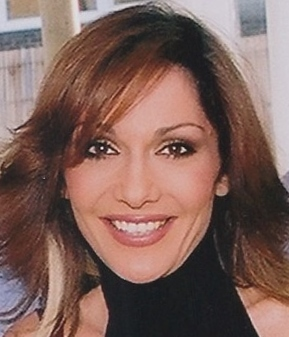

Background information
- Born: Despina Malea; 22 July 1969 (age 57); Tübingen, West Germany
- Origin: Kavala, Greece
- Genres: Laïko; pop; pop rock; dance-pop; eurodance
- Occupations: Singer; actress
- Years active: 1993–present
- Labels: Heaven Music; The Spicy Effect; Minos EMI; Escondida Music

Despina Malea (Greek: Δέσποινα Μαλέα; born 22 July 1969), known as Despina Vandi (Δέσποινα Βανδή), is a Greek singer. Born in Tübingen near Stuttgart, Germany, Vandi's family returned to Kavala, Greece when she was six years old.

After moving to Athens in the early 1990s, Vandi signed with Minos EMI and released two albums Gela Mou (1994) and Esena Perimeno (1996). She then began an exclusive collaboration with songwriter/producer Phoebus and achieved commercial success with her third album, Deka Endoles (1997), followed by the multi-platinum Profities (1999), as she established a more "pop" stage performance style and image, becoming one of the most prominent artists of the laïko/pop genre.

Her single "Ipofero" (2000) became the best-selling single of all-time in Greece. Following Phoebus' departure from Minos EMI, Vandi followed him to the newly formed independent label Heaven Music and released Gia (2001), which became and remains her biggest commercial success, as well as one of the best-selling albums of all time in Greece and Cyprus. Vandi also released the album abroad and the self-titled single "Gia", topping the US Billboard Hot Dance Airplay and making her the first Greek artist to top a Billboard chart. She returned with Stin Avli Tou Paradeisou (2004), which was certified multi-platinum and became her fourth album to achieve six-figure sales. In 2007 10 Hronia Mazi, a ten-year celebration of her collaboration with Phoebus was released, followed by her eighth studio album C'est La Vie. In 2012 she released the album Allaxa, which was certified 2× platinum sales and has been her first double platinum record since 2005.

Vandi has won three Arion Music Awards, ten MAD Video Music Awards, seven Pop Corn Music Awards, and a World Music Award, becoming the first Greek artist recording in Greece to ever win the award. On 14 March 2010, Alpha TV ranked Vandi the fourth top-certified Greek female artist in the nation's phonographic era (since 1960), with 11 records having been certified platinum or multi-platinum and three gold by the International Federation of the Phonographic Industry of Greece. According to Heaven Music, as of 2007, Vandi has sold one million records in Greece.From 2013 to 2015, she was one of the four artists/coaches participating in the Greek version of The Voice called The Voice of Greece. And she was one of the four artists/coaches in Rising Star in 2016.

== Life and career ==
=== Early years (Gela mou & Esena Perimeno 1994–96) ===
Vandi's first album was released in 1994 under the Minos EMI label, titled Gela Mou (Smile at Me). The album was distinguished by the self-titled song "Gela Mou", as well as by the song "Den iparhi tipota" and her duet To Adieksodo (No Way Out) with the popular and acclaimed singer Giannis Parios. Both songs were written by Vassilis Karras.

In 1996, Vandi released her next album, Esena Perimeno (You're The One I'm Waiting For). Singles on the album include Esena Perimeno, Den Pethainei I Agapi, and Efiges. Most of the songs were written by her friend and now musical director Tony Kontaxakis. Although a few of her first songs received some airplay, the first two albums themselves had mild success. Together the albums have sold under 30 thousand copies. A statement made by Vandi implied the combined album sales to be in the range of 10–27 thousand copies.

=== Beginning of Phoebus era and breakthrough (Deka Entoles & Profities 1997–99) ===
1997 would be the year Vandi would make her breakthrough in mainstream Greek music as she teamed up with popular songwriter Phoebus. Phoebus wrote the songs of Vandi's next album, Deka Entoles (Ten Commandments), which was certified double platinum and sold 100,000 copies in Greece. Vandi's partnership with Phoebus would turn out to be one of the most notable in the Greek recording industry and they would continue to have commercial success for a decade and more (they celebrated their 10-year partnership with the release of 10 Hronia Mazi (10 Years Together)). With the success of Deka Entoles Vandi quickly became popular in the Greek music industry with a string of hits and popular appearances.

In 1998 Vandi released the platinum cd-single "Spania", while later that year, she experimented with acting. She was asked to play a guest star role in the hit television show "Dio Xeni" (Two Strangers). Vandi accepted the role and made her first appearance on television. She played a singer of a local small city, who was able to change the sexuality of the main gay character. She managed to gain good reviews for her acting talent.

Vandi's next album Profities (Prophecies) was released in 1999 and was certified gold the day of its release and platinum in 2 days. It eventually became triple platinum, selling 150 thousand copies. Big hits from the album were the songs: "Apapa", "To Giatriko", "To Koritsaki sou" and "Sta Dosa Ola". Later that year Vandi gave her first sold-out solo concert at the concert hall of Lycabettus with 7,000 people in attendance.

=== Move to "Heaven music" and commercial peak (Gia, 2000–01) ===
In 2000, Despina Vandi released the single Ipofero (I Suffer). The single was certified six times platinum and was awarded as being the most successful single of all time in Greece, based on sales at the Virgin Megastores, which reached 150 thousand copies. An honorary award was given to her by Richard Branson of Virgin in London, England.

In 2001 Despina Vandi and Phoebus signed in with Heaven Music, a new break-out record label, owned by the Antenna Group. Despina's following album Gia (2001), meaning "Hi" was a double album including 21 new songs. The album was certified 4× platinum in only 11 days and became one of the best-selling albums of all time in Greece. Many of the songs on the album became hits not only Greece, but also in neighboring countries such as Cyprus, Turkey and Lebanon. Shortly after, Vandi gave an open free concert in Thessaloniki singing in front of a crowd of more than 60,000 people.

At the 2002 World Music Awards, Vandi was awarded as the World's "Best Selling Greek Artist". It was the first time that this award was given to a Greek artist who actually lived and worked in Greece. For her acceptance speech, Vandi said "Above all though, I would like to thank my Greek fans around the world. I dedicate this award to all the Greeks who have supported me with their love all these years and it is because of them that I find myself here at this moment."

Following the success of Gia, Despina released a CD single titled "Ante Gia" (Goodbye) in 2002, with the title track being a remix of "Gia". The single achieved double platinum status. Gia and "Ante Gia" were then compiled and re-released as "Gia & Ante Gia: Collector's Edition", along with four previously unreleased remixes.

=== Live, International exposure and motherhood (2003–04) ===
In 2003 the double album "Despina Vandi Live" was released, containing performances from the singers' concerts around Greece. The album included the greatest personal hits of her 9-year career in the Greek music industry (1994–2003), as long as many songs by other artists, covering a wide variety of genres (from rock-entehno to laïko and traditional Greek music). The album featured also two new songs: "Fevgoume Kardia mou" and "O, ti Oneirevomoun". It was certified platinum, selling more than 60,000 copies.

In the meantime, with Gia having been certified multi-platinum in Greece and Cyprus, some of the songs broke out into the international market in neighboring countries. Seeing potential in an international career, she embarked on one in 2003.

Her first three international singles, "Gia" (2003), "Opa Opa" (2004) and "Come Along Now" (2005) entered the charts around the world. Her first internationally distributed albums are named after the songs "Gia" and "Come Along Now". "Gia" and "Opa Opa" have both charted on the Billboard Hot Dance Club Play and Hot Dance Airplay charts, with Gia reaching number 1 for two weeks on the latter and "Opa Opa" reaching number 3 on the Hot Dance Radio Airplay of Billboard. In addition to the Billboard Charts, Gia reached number 1 on the biggest radio stations in the US, WKTU, KKDL and WPYM. Also, Gia reached number 1 at the Club Charts of Music Week in Great Britain and became the number 1 dance song of the year in USA, Germany, Australia, Austria, Brazil, Italy, France, Spain, Turkey, Cyprus and Sweden. All three singles reached No. 1 on the Australian charts. The song Gia gave to her the award for the best dance artist for the year 2004 in Portugal and she makes a big concert for her European public. Except from "Gia", and the song "Opa Opa" reaching number 1 in Russia, Turkey and Australia. In the first days of October 2004 Despina Vandi makes four big concerts in New York, Atlantic City, Chicago and Toronto. All these concerts was sold out

The song "Come Along Now" became the second best selling single in Russia and the biggest to audience radio station of Russia, Hit FM, awarded to her an honorary award in a special concert for her. Vandi also made an appearance on the hit international show Top of the Pops where she performed her song "Gia" as she was included in some of that week's best-selling popular music artists.

Vandi's work has been remixed by celebrated global DJs and producers, such as Armand Van Helden, Milk & Sugar, Nick Skitz, Roger Sanchez, Junior Vasquez, Pete Tong, Bass Bumpers, DJ Gregory, Level K, XTM, Minimal Chic and Highpass amongst others. The albums Gia and Opa Opa have also been Records of The Week on BBC Radio 1's dance shows. At the end of August (2004) Despina performed live at the Beatstock Festival in New York.

=== Comeback – Stin Avli tou paradeisou (2004–06) ===
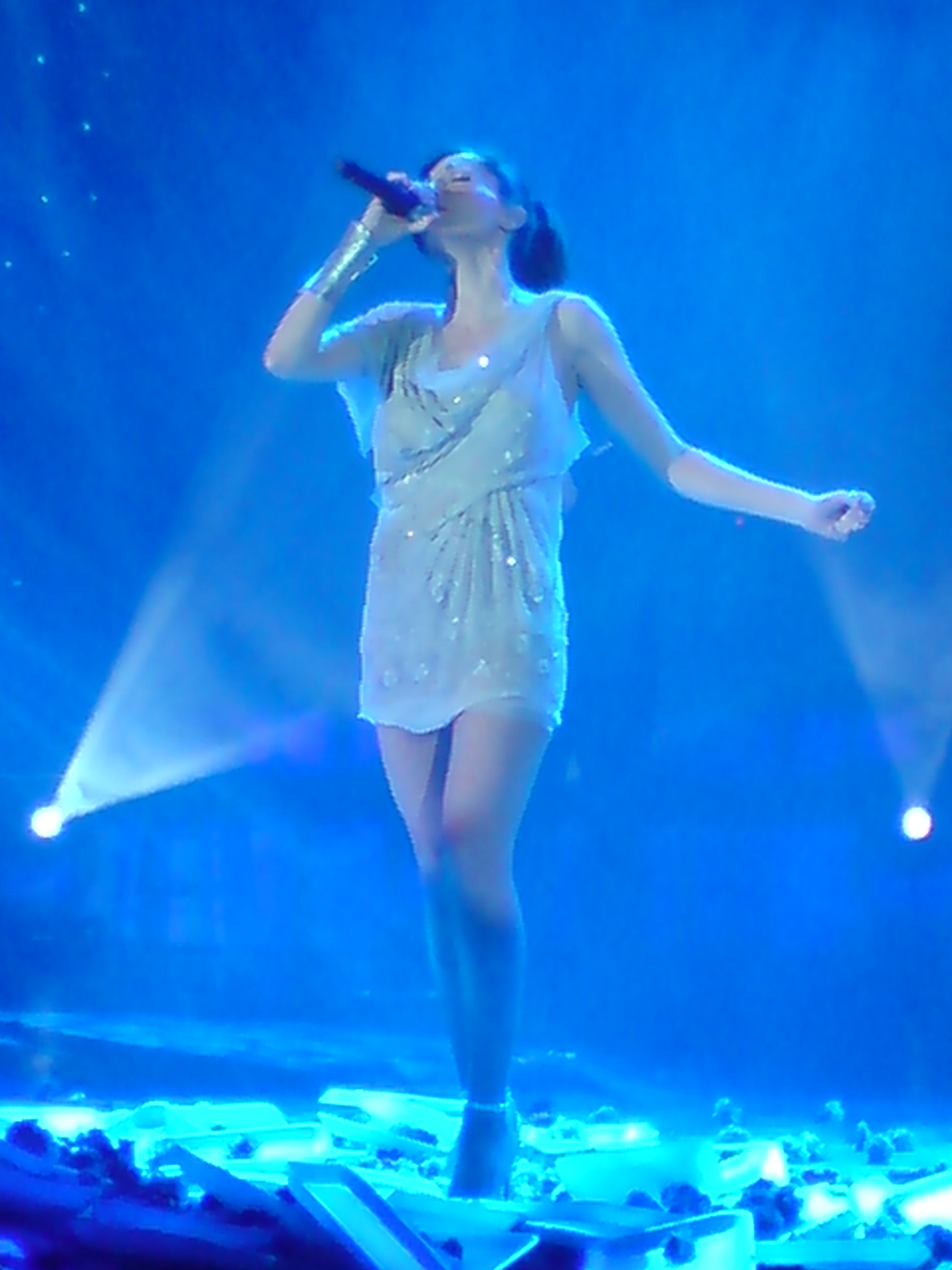
Vandi performing live in Thessaloniki, 2007.

Vandi's next studio album was released at the end of 2004, titled Stin Avli Tou Paradisou (In The Garden of Paradise). Although it sold significantly less than Gia, it reached double platinum status in 2005, becoming her fourth album to reach six figure sales

The album was repackaged as a special edition and included 5 new songs, including the song "Amane", a duet with Giorgos Mazonakis. The actress Katiana Balanika guest stars in the song's music video along with Vandi and Mazonakis. The special edition of the album was released in Greece, Cyprus, Russia, Ukraine, Hungary, Romania, Bulgaria and Turkey. In Turkey the album reached number 2 of the Turkish charts and the Turkish newspaper Hurriyet Daily News named Despina Vandi as the Queen of Greek Pop. For the winter season 2005–06 Vandi performed at Rex with Giorgos Mazonakis. In July 2006, Despina gave a concert in the theater of Lycabettus in Athens singing many of her popular songs.

Despina Vandi released the CD single "Kalanta" (Carols) in Greece on 22 November 2006, which reached double platinum status after two weeks from the release of the CD single. The videoclip of "Kalanta" was released on 19 December, soon followed by the video of her next hit single, "Mehri Mai Mina" (Till The Month of May). Vandi and Mazonakis once again collaborated for the winter season 2006–07. She performed her last show at the Rex Music Theater on 18 February 2007 and it marked an end to her performances there for seven consecutive years. Due to her pregnancy, Vandi did not plan any summer concerts for 2007, and on 21 August 2007, she gave birth to her son, Giorgos.

=== 10 Hronia Mazi & Destiny (2007–2008) ===
On 10 October 2007 (10/10) Vandi released her new single "Thelo" (I Want) simultaneously on all radio and TV stations across Greece at 10 am. It marked her 10th anniversary of collaborating with the composer Phoebus. The song topped Nielsen's Radio Airplay chart for 8 consecutive weeks in Greece. It marked her 10-year anniversary of collaborating with Phoebus. The song reached the top of the Nielsen's Radio Airplay chart for Greece for six consecutive weeks. The second single from the album and the title track "10 Hronia Mazi" (10 Years Together), a rock ballad celebrating the 10-year collaboration with Phoebus, was released on 16 November 2007. The album 10 Hronia Mazi was released 6 December 2007 on three discs featuring fifteen new songs. The album achieved platinum certification in the first week. It sold 30 thousand copies, becoming Vandi' s lowest selling album for over a decade.

During the winter season 2007–08 Vandi collaborated with Vasilis Karras at Diogenis Studio.

On 6 March 2008, Vandi released the third single from the album, titled "Agapi" (Love). The single was on the MAD TV Charts for six weeks with one week at number one. On 24 April 2008, the fourth single titled "Fantasou Apla" (Simply imagine) was released.

Vandi was featured on the gold-certified album Sehnsucht by German electronica act Schiller, which was released in early 2008, providing vocals for the song "Destiny", composed by Phoebus. She performed the track with Schiller on 17 June 2008 at the MAD Video Music Awards 2008, where she won the category of "Best Female Artist" and also performed "I Gi Ki I Selini" (Earth and Moon).

On 24 June 2008, the album Deka Hronia Mazi was repackaged with the title 10 Hronia Mazi: It's Destiny, including the song "Destiny" by Schiller featuring Despina Vandi. Two more singles were released: "I Gi Ki I Selini" and "Tha Thela"; the music video for the first was her performance at the MAD Awards, while the video for the latter was the live performance of the song at the Love Radio party which took place on 12 May 2008.

Vandi was involved in the Global One music project. She attended a recording session in Beijing with Chinese pop star Wei-Wei and Brazilian samba singer Daniela Mercury, while also attending the project's first official press conference. The project's goal, driven by international record producer Rob Hoffman, was to have one artist representing their country Global One songs in their native language, as well as in the English language, in efforts to pool together as many languages and cultures as possible to promote their artistry on a global level.

In the end of 2008, Vandi began an international tour and on 10–12 October she performed three sold-out concerts in Melbourne, Sydney and Adelaide. She later performed in charity concerts in Cyprus, where she was awarded the platinum award for her album 10 Hronia Mazi in Cyprus, after she had already received the platinum certification for the sales of the album in Greece. On 15–24 May 2009, she performed in a five venue tour of the United States and Canada. Following her tour in America, she collaborated with Goin' Through for a lengthy tour throughout Greece.

=== Iparhi Zoi (2009) & move to "The Spicy Effect" ===
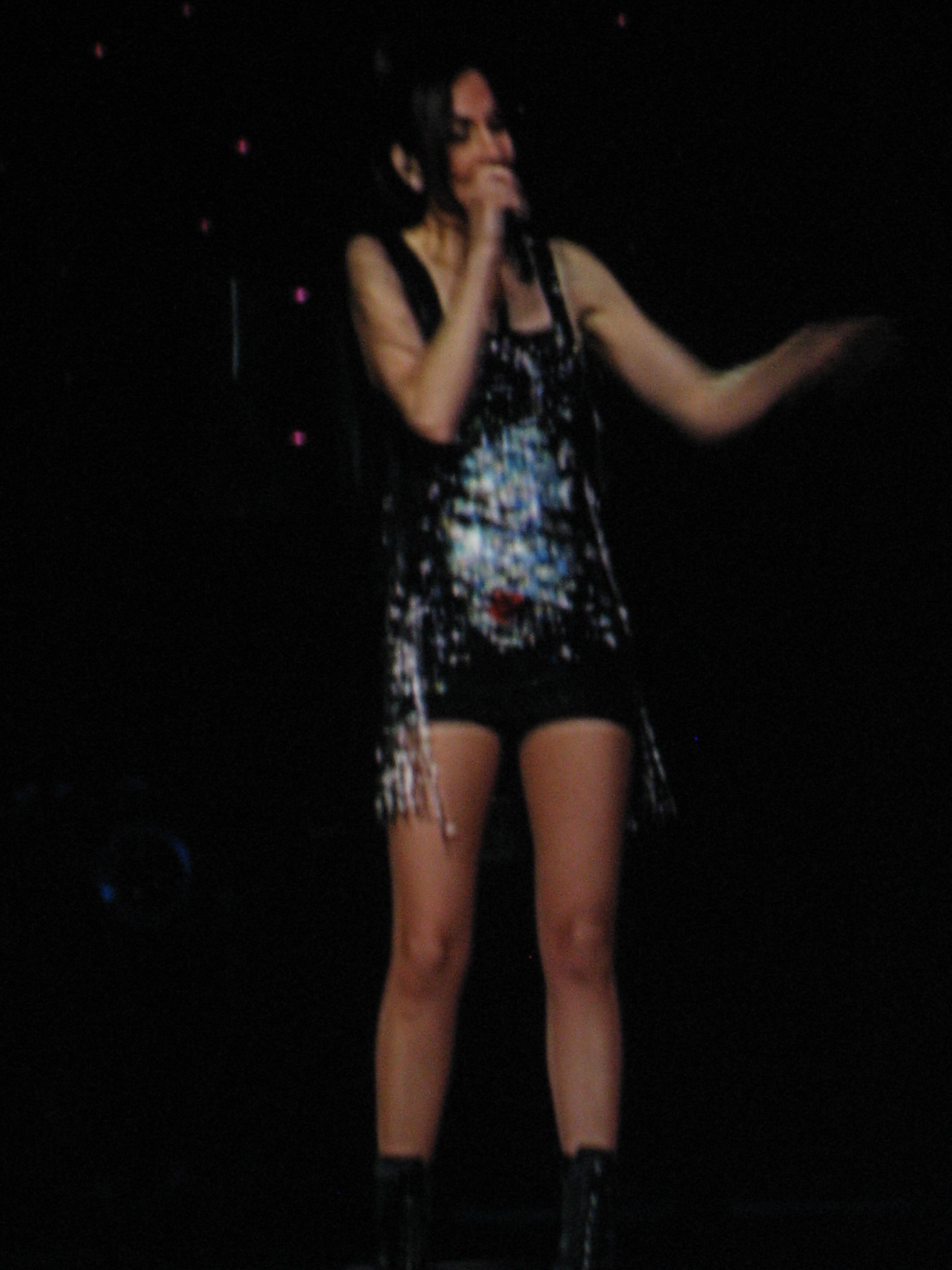
Vandi performing at the Mohegan Sun Arena in Connecticut as part of her 2009 five venue North American tour.

On 16 June, Vandi made a dynamic comeback, after a year's absence, with the pop-rock song Iparhi Zoi (There's still life). The song was written by Phoebus and it was presented on 24 June in the Mad Video Music Awards 2009. On 29 June, Despina gave the opening concert in Thessaloniki for the Long Hot Summer Tour. After 32 sold-out concerts the tour sold 150,000 tickets. With this tour Vandi broke the record for pre-sale tickets to the concert in the Olympia pre-selling 3,000 tickets. The tour was, also, the most successful tour of 2009.

Following the departure of her songwriter and collaborator Phoebus from Heaven Music, Vandi officially announced on 2 November 2009, that she also has chosen to leave Heaven Music and signed in with the record label founded by Phoebus, called The Spicy Effect.

On 11 December, Vandi returned to the Greek nightlife, singing at club Politia in Thessaloniki alongside Goin' Through. On 12 December, Heaven Music, released the compilation "Despina Vandi – Greatest Hits 2001–2009". Vandi later performed at Thalassa People's Stage with the group 48 Ores. The show began on 15 April and lasted until July. Vandi later appeared on 14 March on Chart Show, a show broadcast by Alpha TV where her certifications and sales figures were chronicled, ranking her in the 4th position among Greek female singers in the phonographic era.

=== C'est La Vie (2010) ===
In 2010 Vandi presented her new song, "Koritsi Prama", exclusively for the listeners who wοn VIP invitations from Dromos 89.8 FM radio. "Koritsi Prama, Part 1", was released on 22 March and was the lead single from her eighth studio album, "C' est la vie". The pop song written by Phoebus was the first release coordinated by The Spicy Effect label. The music video was filmed on 22 March at "Diogenis Studio". The song was the first half of a two-part work Vandi released "Koritsi Prama, Part 2", two months later, on 14 May 2010.

The new album of Despina Vandi, called C'est La Vie, was released on 13 June with Real News newspaper. It was her first album to be released along with a newspaper, following a popular tendency of the Greek musical industry, as an effort to deal with the reduction in the disc sales. The newspaper, along with the album, sold more than 100,000 copies. On the other hand, this release choice resulted in the album receiving no official certification of gold sales, for the first time for a Vandi album after her early releases at the first half of the 1990s. On 14 June, Vandi performed live at the MAD Video Music Awards, presenting her new song "Kommati Ap' Tin Kardia Sou". The song was also the following single of the album C'est La Vie and was released on 7 June 2010. The video clip was released on 5 July 2010 and made positive impressions, revealing a "rock side" of Vandi. The third single of the album, "Erota Theli I Zoi", was released to radio stations on 13 September 2010. The music video, filmed on the Greek island of Hydra, was uploaded on 19 October 2010 on Spicy's YouTube Channel.

Furthermore, the German band Schiller, who had worked with Vandi in the past, released a new song featuring her as vocals, called Sunday and included it in their album Breathless, the international version of Schiller's album Atemlos. The song was also included in the album C'est La Vie.

Vandi was also the first artist who took part in the MTV Unplugged concert series of the music channel MTV Greece. The concert took place in the theater Hora in Kypseli on 9 June. She later went on a tour around Greece, along with Elli Kokkinou. After the successful concerts all over the Greece, Vandi performed live on 31 October at HMV Forum of London. It was the first time for Vandi in London and it was also a sold out. After the concert, she appeared at the music scene VOX and after five months, the show finished on 6 March. On 14 June 2011 Despina Vandi appeared on Mad Video Music Awards 2011 and performed the song "Gi' Alli Mia Fora" (For one more time).

=== Allaxa (2012) ===
In November 2011 a digital single was released by Vandi called "Mou 'His Perasi", as a promo to Despina's forthcoming album. The music was written by Gavrilis Mosas and the lyrics by Phoebus. The video clip, filmed in the area of the Messolonghi lagoon was also released the same month. The song's release was followed by another digital single taken from her 9th studio album, called Girismata. On late 2011 Vandi's appearances began at the nightclub FEVER along with Elli Kokkinou and Nikos Ikonomopoulos.

On 2012 the album Allaxa was released, marking Vandi's return to a more laïko genre after the poorly received C' est la vie album. Apart from Phoebus there is a collaboration with songwriters such as Eleni Giannatsoulia, Olga Vlahopoulou, Vangelis Kostantinidis and Gavrilis Mosas. The album was certified double-platinum sales and re-established Vandi's commercial success with multiple hits such as: Mou 'His Perasi, Girismata, To asteri mou, To nisi (its videoclip was filmed in the island of Skiathos) and Katalavaino.

=== Eurovision TV presenter – The Voice – De Me Stamatises (2013–14) ===
Despina has been offered many times to represent Greece in Eurovision song contest but she never accepted. On 15 January 2013 the Hellenic Broadcasting Corporation (ERT) announced that it had reached an agreement with private music channel MAD TV to take on the organisation and production of a national final to select a song to represent Greece in the contest. Despina Vandi was selected to host the event along with actor Giorgos Kapoutzidis. It was the first time that a well-known singer hosted such an event. The following year, Vandi and Kapoutzidis hosted again the event, called "Eurosong 2014: a MAD Show".

In 2013–2014 Vandi was one of the four artists/coaches participating in the Greek version of The Voice, along with Antonis Remos, Melina Aslanidou and Michalis Kouinelis. The winner of the show's first season, Maria Elena Kyriakou, was on Vandi's team.

On the meantime Despina's digital single Hano Esena produced by Dimitris Kontopoulos was released on 2013, receiving positive reviews and remaining 10 weeks at the top of the airplay chart.

In December 2014 Vandi released her new album 'De Me Stamatises' (including 10 tracks). It was the first album since 1997, in which none of the songs was written by her long-time producer Phoebus. Instead, she collaborated again with various songwriters, among them: Dimitris Kontopoulos, Eleni Giannatsoulia, Olga Vlahopoulou, Giorgos Sampanis, Nikos Moraitis and Vasilis Gavriilidis. The first three new singles Kalimera, Ola allazoun and Kane kati, were released right after her return to Heaven Music.

=== Afti Ine I Diafora Mas – TV – Musicals (2016–2022) ===
The album Afti Ine I Diafora Mas was released in October 2016 by Heaven Music. Vandi collaborated again with various songwriters (among which Dimitris Kontopoulos, Thanos Papanikolaou, Nikos Moraitis, Eleni Giannatsoulia, Vasilis Gavriilidis, Olga Vlahopoulou). Her eleventh album features the following singles: 'Mia Anasa Makria Sou', 'O,ti Thes Geniete Tora', 'Gia Kaki Mou Tihi'.

Apart from her recordings, Vandi starred in the Greek version of the musical theater show – "Mamma Mia!", playing the role of Donna. Vandi's performance as Donna was well-received among critics and the audience. "Mamma Mia!" continued its success in the summer of 2018, with a big tour all around Greece. The show ended up doing a total of 300 shows and selling more than 100,000 tickets in two years. (2016–18). Vandi continued her musical career starring in the star-studded musical show "To Diko Mas Cinema" (2019), directed by the famous creative duo Reppas – Papathanasiou. As expected the show was a huge commercial success selling more than 90.000 tickets during the summer of 2019. It was the biggest commercial hit of the Greek summer theatrical season. Inspired by the musical, she released the album "To Diko Mou Cinema" (2019), including covers of notable songs from popular Greek films produced in the 1960s and 1970s.

In 2019, she produced and presented the travel show "My Greece". Vandi visits a variety of Greek towns and villages showcasing their traditions, culture, local food, and history. "My Greece" is currently in its third season.

As of October 2022, she was a member of Barking Well Media, founded by Nikos Koklonis, where she hosted a variety of shows, including Chart Show, Just the 2 of Us, The X Factor, and My Greece.

In 2024, she collaborated with rap artist Mente Fuerte, and together they reached No. 1 on the Official IFPI Airplay Chart by Media Inspector with the song "Panselinos." The track also achieved significant success in the digital domain, becoming double platinum in digital sales.

== Personal life ==
Although born in Germany, Vandi's family was from Kavala, Greece, where she and her family moved when she was six years old. As a result, she did not learn German, unlike the rest of her family. She has one older brother and an older sister. Living in a lower-middle-class family, her dream was to become either an actress or a singer but she always knew that she should have something more solid as a background so she went on to study psychology, philosophy, and education at the University of Thessaloniki. When she first began singing, she used the stage name of "Elli Mara" before adopting the "Vandi" moniker, to hide that she was singing from her parents.

From 2003 to 2021, Vandi was married to Demis Nikolaidis, ex-international soccer player and former president of AEK Athens. They have two children: a daughter Melina (born February 2004) and a son Giorgos (born August 2007).

Since 2021, Vandi has been in a relationship with Greek actor Vasilis Bisbikis.

On 18 August 2008, Vandi was in a car accident on Kifissias Avenue in Kifissia, Greece. The car she was in, driven by her chauffeur, slipped on an oil slick that leaked from a tanker truck causing the car to crash into the truck ahead of her. After drivers helped pull her out of the vehicle, she was transported by ambulance to the general hospital in Athens. Vandi only suffered a cut to her head and got stitches.

== Discography ==
Studio albums

- Gela Mou (1994)
- Esena Perimeno (1996)
- Deka Endoles (1997) 2× platinum
- Profities (1999) 3× platinum
- Gia (2001) 5× platinum
- Despina Vandi Live (2003) platinum
- Stin Avli Tou Paradeisou (2004) 2× platinum
- 10 Hronia Mazi (2007) platinum
- C'est La Vie (2010) platinum
- Allaksa (2012) 2× platinum
- De Me Stamatises (2014) platinum
- Afti Ine I Diafora Mas (2016) gold
- To Diko Mou Cinema (2019)
- Sta dosa ola (2020)

Extended plays

- Ipofero (2000) 6× platinum
- Ante Gia (2002) 2× platinum
- Come Along Now (2004) platinum
- Kalanta (2006) 2× platinum
- Ola Ksanarhizoune M' Emena (2022) platinum

Singles

- Spania (1998) platinum
- Gia (2003) gold
- Opa Opa (2004)

== Tours ==
=== Concert series ===
- Kypriaki Gonia (1992–93)
- Avantage (1993) (with Vasilis Karras and Eleni Peta)
- Posidonio (1993–94) (with Vasilis Karras, Katy Garbi, Dionisis Schinas, Lambis Livieratos, Kaka Koritsia)
- Palais Royale (1994–95)
- Club In (1995) (with Thanos Kalliris, Zafeiropoulos)
- Athens Show Centre (1995–96) (with Christos Nikolopoulos, Aggelos Dionisiou, Litsa Giagousi, Evridiki)
- Bio Bio (1996) (with Giorgos Mazonakis, Christina Farmaki, Kraousakis, Panagiotou)
- On the Rocks (1996) (with Paschalis, Dakis, Sofia Vossou, Elina Konstantopoulou)
- Posidonio (1996–97) (with Lefteris Pantazis, Stefanos Korkolis, Adelfoi Tzavara)
- Diogenis Pallas (1997) (with Giannis Parios)
- Teatro (1997) (with Notis Sfakianakis)
- Rex (1997–98) (with Notis Sfakianakis)
- Pili Axiou (1998) (with Notis Sfakianakis)
- Ribas (1998) (with Giannis Parios)
- Gazi (1998–99) (with Vasilis Karras)
- Teatro (1999) (with Vasilis Karras, Giorgos Lembesis)
- Gazi (1999–2000) (with Giorgos Mazonakis, Lambis Livieratos, Giorgos Lembesis)
- Pili Axiou (2000) (with Lambis Livieratos and Giorgos Lembesis)
- Rex (2000–01) (with Nikos Kourkoulis and Lambis Livieratos)
- Pili Axiou (2001) (with Lambis Livieratos and Kostas Doxas)
- Rex (2001–02) (with Sakis Rouvas and Kostas Doxas)
- Rex (2002–03) (with Tolis Voskopoulos)
- Rex (2004–05) (with Thanos Petrelis, Kalomira, and Giorgos Christou)
- Palai de sports (2005) (with Kalomoira and Giorgos Christou)
- Pili Axiou (2005) (with Thanos Petrelis, Kalomira, and Giorgos Christou)
- Rex (2005–06) (with Giorgos Mazonakis and Giorgos Christou)
- Boom (2006) (with Stamatis Gonidis)
- Rex (2006–07) (with Giorgos Mazonakis)
- Boom (2007) (with Sakis Rouvas)
- Diogenis Studio (2007–08) (with Vasilis Karras and Nino)
- Odeon (2008) (with Vasilis Karras)
- Politia Live Clubbing (2009–2010) (with Goin' Through and Giannis Apostolidis)
- Thalassa: People's Stage (2010) (with 48 Ores)
- VOX (2010–2011) (with Panos Kalidis and Elisavet Spanou)
- Fever (2011–2012) (with Elli Kokkinou and Nikos Economopoulos)
- Posidonio (2012–2013) (with Antipas and Vegas)

=== Concert tours ===
- 1999 Summer Tour
- 2001 Summer Tour
- 2002 Summer Tour
- 2003 Summer Tour
- North American Tour (2004)
- 2005 Summer Tour
- 2006 Summer Tour
- 2008 Summer Tour
- World Tour (2008–09)
- Together Through Summer: Long Hot Summer Tour (2009) (with Goin' Through and Stelios Maximos)
- 2010 Summer Tour (with Elli Kokkinou)
- 2017 Summer Tour (with Helena Paparizou)

== Filmography ==
=== Television ===
Year	Title	Role(s)	Notes
1996	Red Velvet	Herself (guest singer)	Talk show; 1 episode
1996	Us & Us	Herself	Episode: "Christmas hysteria"
1999	Dyo Xenoi	Charoula	6 episodes
2005	MAD Video Music Awards	Herself (performance)	TV special
2006	MAD Video Music Awards	Herself (performance)	TV special
2008	MAD Video Music Awards	Herself (performance)	TV special
2009	MAD Video Music Awards	Herself (performance)	TV special
2010	MAD Video Music Awards	Herself (performance)	TV special
2011	MadWalk - The Fashion Music Project	Herself (performance)	TV special
2011	MAD Video Music Awards	Herself (performance)	TV special
2012	MAD Video Music Awards	Herself (performance)	TV special
2013	MadWalk - The Fashion Music Project	Herself (performance)	TV special
2013	MadWalk - The Fashion Music Project	Herself (performance)	TV special
2013-2014	Eurosong: A MAD Show	Herself (host)	TV special
2013–2015	The Voice of Greece	Herself (coach)	Talent show; season 1-2
2014	MAD Video Music Awards	Herself (performance)	TV special
2015	Cyprus MadWalk	Herself (performance)	TV special
2015	MAD Video Music Awards	Herself (performance)	TV special
2016	MadWalk - The Fashion Music Project	Herself (host)	TV special
2016–2017	Rising Star	Herself (judge)	Talent show; season 1
2019–2021	My Greece	Herself (host)	Travel show; 56 episodes; also producer (season 1)
2019	The X Factor	Herself (host)	Season 6
2020	OPEN New Year	Herself (performance)	TV special
2020–present	Just the 2 Of Us	Herself (judge)	Season 3-7
2021	At Home with MEGA with Despina Vandi	Herself (host)	Episode 30; season 2
2022-2023	Chart Show: Your Countdown	Herself (host)	Season 4-

Commercials
Year	Commercial	Role	Notes
2005	TIM	Herself	
2006	Stop Aids 2006	Herself	
2011	Oriflame	Herself	
2014	ANT1 – Oli Edo: Agapame	Herself	New season sampaign 2014–2015
2015	The Voice of Greece	Herself	Season 2
2015	Fage's "Ageladitsa" yogurt	Herself	

Theatrical plays
Year	Title	Role	Playwright	Stage
2016–2018	Mamma Mia!	Donna Sheridan	Catherine Johnson, Themis Marsellou	Acropol Theatre
2018	Mamma Mia!	Donna Sheridan	Catherine Johnson, Themis Marsellou	Radio City Theatre
2018	Mamma Mia!	Donna Sheridan	Catherine Johnson, Themis Marsellou	Summer tour
2019	To Diko Mas Cinema	Mary	Thanasis Papathanasiou, Mihalis Reppas	Alsos Theatre

== See also ==
- Number-one dance airplay hits of 2004 (U.S.)
- List of artists who reached number one on the U.S. dance airplay chart
- Hot Dance Airplay
- List of artists featured on MTV Unplugged
