= Music Control =

British music radio program

Music Control was a nightly, chart-oriented, network radio show, presented by Kevin Hughes. It was broadcast in the UK from 2001 to 2008 by GCap Media across 'The One Network' to 39 different radio stations.

Music Control was an interactive radio show, where listeners could have their say on the show’s new music, review albums and gigs and discuss various topics via phone, text, email, message board, and social networking platforms.

Unsigned bands were given the opportunity to upload their music to the website, resulting in air play for the bands.

== Features ==
=== Brand New ===
Each evening Kevin Hughes played a brand new song, this was usually the song's first play on the Network and was often a first radio play in the UK. Listeners were invited to contact the show to give their opinion of the track.

=== Celebrity Interviews ===
Each night Kevin spoke to celebrities, usually from the music industry but guests also included TV and movie stars. Guests included Nelly, Usher, The Zutons, The Jonas Brothers, The Feeling, Chris Brown, OneRepublic, The Hoosiers, Thirty Seconds to Mars, Mary J. Blige, Justin Lee Collins, Martin Freeman, Chad Kroeger, Dannii Minogue, Girls Aloud, Kylie Minogue, Leona Lewis, Dave Grohl, Natasha Bedingfield and will.i.am. Kevin was also one of the first presenters on UK commercial radio to play and interview Adele. Adele visited the Bristol studios to record a live session for the show in 2007.

=== Music Control Minute ===
The Music Control minute was a fast and furious nightly competition giving listeners 60 seconds to answer as many topical and show biz questions as they could in order to win iTunes downloads.

=== Uploaded ===
Uploaded was the part of the show, which gave unsigned artists the chance to get their music showcased on the radio. Bands could upload their music through the website and a band was featured each evening on the show.

==== Uploaded Album ====
Throughout 2008 Music Control gave unsigned bands the chance to appear on the Music Control virtual album. Each week four bands were put up to the listener vote through the website. The winning band then goes through to a monthly final. At the end of the year all the monthly winners won a spot on the album.

=== Competitions ===
Each week a different competition was run across the week, giving listeners an opportunity to win prizes which could be anything from albums and signed artwork to holidays.

=== Most Wanted ===
Kevin’s review of what’s hot right now in the world of music, DVD, movies, TV and games.

=== Tune of the Week ===
Each week Kevin supported a song, which he thought was going to be a hit; often Kevin would speak to the artist at some point during the week about the new single.

== Previous Features ==
- The Music Control Chart - formerly known as The Core Control Chart, the Music Control Chart counted down the top 10 most requested and voted for songs during the day leading up to the show. It lasted approximately one hour at the beginning of each show. After 2007, however, the chart was no longer featured.
- The Music Control Freak - allows a lucky listener to speak with Kevin and enjoy their '15 minutes of fame' throughout the week.
- myPlaylist - one Listener a night was given the chance to pick the tracks through one part of the show, about half an hour.

== History ==
=== The Hot 30 Countdown ===
From Christmas 1998 until Christmas 2001, the show was known as the Hot 30 Countdown (later Hot 30 Countdown dot com) and was presented by Mel Everett and Rob Smith. From January 2002 it was presented by Alison Mulrooney.

The show counted down the biggest 30 songs as requested by listeners.

=== Core Control ===
Core Control started broadcasting in the summer of 2002. Kam Kelly and Sally Bailey started off presenting the show and high audience figures were achieved. Star guests were also regularly part of the show, with different guests being interviewed almost every evening at one point.

In late 2004, Kam Kelly quit as Core Control's main presenter. After a spell at Capital Radio in London, he moved to South Yorkshire to host 'Kam Kelly's Home Run' on Hallam FM. In 2009, he reunited with Sally Bailey to host Red Dragon FM's breakfast show.

=== Music Control ===
With the departure of Kelly, the opportunity was taken to make some changes to the show. Firstly, the name of the show was changed to Music Control and Kevin Hughes joined Sally Bailey as the show's main presenter. New features were also introduced, however the show's basic format remained the same and the audience figures did not suffer.

Throughout 2005, the show continued with its successful format. The show was unaffected by the merger of GWR Radio Group and the Capital Radio Group, and continued as normal into 2006.

=== Summer 2006 ===
In mid-2006, the show changed and became less focused around phone and text requests, and concentrated more on downloads and internet based requesting. To go with this new approach, the show's website was redesigned with a more interactive feel.

A new feature was also introduced known as My Playlist. This allowed listeners (via the website) and star guests to control around 30 minutes of the show with their favourite songs.

In late 2006, Sally Bailey announced that after 4 and a half years of being with the show, she would be leaving to give birth. She also announced she would not be returning. Her last show featured surprise good luck messages from many chart stars and a tribute song was played.

In 2007, Kevin Hughes presented the show solo.

== June 2008 ==
As part of on-going changes on The One Network, Music Control was put to rest on Friday 27 June 2008. On Monday 30 June 2008, Global Radio, the new owners of GCap, implemented more networking across the stations, and the programme name was changed to Kevin Hughes in the Evening. As part of the 're-launch', the programme web site was discarded and a uniform page on all the stations websites were used. The new show focused more on music and featured Kevin talking to bigger chart stars.

== Broadcasting ==
The show broadcast for five nights a week, Monday to Friday between 7pm-10pm. In 2008 the show changed to Mon-Thursday only.

The show was broadcast on most of GCap Media's One Network stations across the United Kingdom.

The show broadcast from GCap Media's studios in Bristol, home of GWR Bristol. In late 2008, when the name changed to Kevin Hughes in the Evening- the show was broadcast from Global Radio HQ in London's Leicester Square.

In March 2008, Music Control was the biggest radio show, according to listening figures on UK commercial radio.

The evening programme ended as a result of the One Network being dissolved in 2009, with most of the stations transitioning into the Heart network and taking the evening programmes originating at Heart London. Kevin Hughes became showbiz reporter at Capital FM (and across Global Radio); since 2019 he has hosted the breakfast show at Heart 90s.
