= Antique discography =

- Studio albums: 3
- Extended plays: 2
- Compilation albums: 3
- Singles: 9
- Music videos: 12
- Promotional singles: 4
- Hybrid albums: 2

The discography of Antique, a Swedish-Greek laïko and Eurodance musical duo, consists of three studio albums, two hybrid albums, two extended plays (EP), three compilation albums, nine singles, four promotional singles, and 12 music videos and 50 recorded songs. In 1999 Helena Paparizou and Nikos Panagiotidis, two Swedes born to Greek immigrant parents, recorded a demo of the Notis Sfakianakis hit "Opa Opa", leading to the formation of Antique and a contract with the newly formed Swedish indie label Bonnier Music. "Opa Opa" was released as a single in August. Becoming popular with the diaspora initially, it became a top ten hit across Scandinavia, while also charting in Romania, Germany, and Switzerland. It was the first Greek-language song to reach the Swedish top five and was certified platinum and Antique were the first act to be nominated at the Grammis with a Greek-language song. The follow-up single "Dinata Dinata" also reached the top ten and was certified gold. Their debut album, Mera Me Ti Mera, was released later that year, infusing Greek laïko music with Eurodance beats in a blend of both Greek and English lyrics. The album peaked at number 27 on the Swedish Albums Chart and spawned a further single, the title track. They released a self-titled EP of remixes of their first two hits in 2000.

In 2001 Antique competed and won the ticket to represent Greece in the Eurovision Song Contest 2001 with the song "(I Would) Die for You", which placed third in the final contest, Greece's highest result in contest history at the time. This brought them recognition in Greece, where they were mostly unknown, now signed to V2 Records. Their debut album was re-released there and was certified gold by the International Federation of the Phonographic Industry of Greece. Their second studio album, Die for You, was released in June 2001 in both Greece and Sweden, peaking at number 16 in the latter and being certified gold in Greece. The title track peaked at number three in Sweden and became their second gold-certified single there, while in Greece it topped the charts and was certified triple platinum, becoming one of the best-selling singles of all time. It charted within the top ten of Romania, Norway, and Europe and entered the charts of Denmark, Germany, and Switzerland. The other singles included "Ligo Ligo", which became the group's lowest-charting song in Sweden, and "Follow Me" which reached the top 20 in Sweden and Romania. Antique were awarded for shipments of 100 thousand records within the first year of their Greek career and were the best-selling group of the year. They won the Pop Corn Music Award for Best Group in 2002. They released a third album in December 2001 only in Greece, titled Me Logia Ellinika, a compilation of past remixes, videos, and new songs. Apart from "Follow Me (O,ti Theleis)", it included the laïko singles "Me Logia Ellinika" and "Kainourgia Agapi". It was re-released in 2002 with the content also released on the standalone EP Dance: Re-mixes + Videos.

Now based in Greece, Antique released their third studio album there, Alli Mia Fora (2002) which peaked at number four on the Greek Albums Chart and was certified gold. It spawned the singles "Moro Mou" and "Alli Mia Fora". A compilation of mostly past songs translated into English, Blue Love (2003), was released as their final studio album in Sweden. It topped the Greek International Albums Chart and became their highest-charting album in Sweden, at 13, while also charting in Finland. The singles were English versions of "Moro Mou", which tied their highest peak there at three, and "Time to Say Goodbye" ("Alli Mia Fora") reached the top 20 in Sweden and Romania. There was also a promotional single "Why?" featuring Bulgarian artist Slavi Trifonov, while the final single, "List of Lovers", failed to chart anywhere. Antique announced their disbandment in 2003 and a series of compilations were released beginning with the box set Collector's Edition (2003) in Greece, while The Very Best of Antique peaked at 47 in Sweden. Another Greek compilation Collection: Hits & Remixes was released in 2006.

In 2019, Antique made a reunion for one day only in Gothenburg performing their smash hits in We Who Love The 90's Festival.

In 2022, Antique returned as the representative of the music industry by covering Ti Ti hit song from Giorgos Alkaios which was a success in 1992. Antique are represented by Minos EMI in Greece and by Cosmos Music in Sweden.

== Albums ==
=== Studio albums ===
List of albums, with selected chart positions, sales figures, and certifications
Title	Album details	Peak chart positions			Certifications	Sales threshold
Title	Album details	SWE	GRE	CYP	Certifications	Sales threshold
Mera Me Ti Mera	Released: October 1999; Label: Bonnier; Formats: CD, digital download	29	*	*	IFPI GRE: Gold	GRE: 25,000
Die for You	Released: 19 June 2001; Label: Bonnier, V2; Formats: CD, digital download	16	*	*	IFPI GRE: Gold	GRE: 25,000
Alli Mia Fora	Released: December 2002; Label: V2; Formats: CD, digital download	—	4	*	IFPI GRE: Gold	GRE: 20,000
"—" denotes items which were not released in that country or failed to chart. "*" denotes unknown or unavailable chart positions.

=== Other albums ===
List of albums, with selected chart positions, sales figures, and certifications
Title	Album details	Peak chart positions				
Title	Album details	SWE	GRE	GRE Int	CYP	FIN
Me Logia Ellinika	Released: 17 December 2001; Label: V2; Formats: CD,	—	*	—	—	—
Blue Love	Released: 2003; Label: Bonnier, V2; Formats: LP, CD, digital download	13	3	1	—	31
"—" denotes items which were not released in that country or failed to chart. "*" denotes unknown or unavailable chart positions.

=== Extended plays ===
List of albums
Title	Album details
Antique	Released: October 2000; Label: Popular; Format: EP
Dance: Re-mixes + Videos	Released: 2002; Label: V2; Format: EP
Axento 2014 Remixes	Released: 7 March 2014; Label: Cosmos; Formats: digital download EP

=== Compilation albums ===
List of albums, with selected chart positions, sales figures, and certifications
Title	Album details	Peak chart positions		
Title	Album details	SWE	GRE	CYP
Antique Collection: Hits & Remixes	Released: 24 April 2002; Label: V2; Formats: CD, digital download	—	*	*
Collector's Edition	Released: 2003; Label: Bonnier; Formats: CD, digital download	—	*	*
The Very Best of Antique	Released: 2004; Label: Bonnier; Formats: CD, digital download	47	—	—
Greatest Hits & Remixes 2014	Released: 28 February 2014; Label: Cosmos; Formats: digital download	*	*	*
"—" denotes items which were not released in that country or failed to chart. "*" denotes unknown or unavailable chart positions.

== Singles ==
List of singles, with selected chart positions and certifications, showing year released and album name
Title	Year	Peak chart positions							Certifications	Album
Title	Year	SWE	GRE	DEN	GER	NOR	ROM	SWI	Certifications	Album
"Opa Opa"	1999	5	—	3	60	9	2	51	DEN: Gold; SWE: Platinum	Mera Me Ti Mera
"Dinata Dinata"	1999	8	—	—	—	19	8	—	SWE: Gold	Mera Me Ti Mera
"Mera Me Ti Mera"	2000	45	—	—	—	—	—	—		Mera Me Ti Mera
"(I Would) Die for You"	2001	3	1	15	85	9	4	75	GRE: 3× Platinum; SWE: Gold	Die for You
"Ligo Ligo"	2001	48	—	—	—	—	—	—		Die for You
"Follow Me"	2001	15	—	—	—	—	17	—		Die for You
"Moro Mou"	2003	3	—	—	—	—	9	—		Blue Love
"Time to Say Goodbye"	2003	13	—	—	—	—	17	—		Blue Love
"List of Lovers"	2003	—	—	—	—	—	—	—		Blue Love
"Ti Ti"	2022	—	—	—	—	—	—	—		Non-album single
"—" denotes items which were not released in that country or did not chart.

=== Promotional singles ===
List of songs, with selected chart positions, showing year charted and album name
Song	Year	Peak chart positions			Album
Song	Year	GRE Air	CYP Air	BUL	Album
"Me Logia Ellinika"	2002	*	*	—	Me Logia Ellinika
"Kainourgia Agapi"	2002	*	*	—	Me Logia Ellinika
"Why?" (featuring Slavi Trifonov)	2003	*	*	*	Blue Love
"Antique Hitmix"	2004	—	—	—	The Very Best of Antique
"—" denotes items which were not released in that country or did not chart. "*" denotes unknown or unavailable chart positions.

== Other appearances ==
Title	Year	Album
"Adiko Kai Krima" (with Katy Garbi)	2001	Apla Ta Pragmata
"V-Power"	2002	Non-album release

== List of songs ==
List of songs, showing year released and album name
Title	Year	Album(s)
"Adiko Kai Krima" (with Katy Garbi)	2001	Me Logia Ellinika
"Alli Mia Fora"	2002	Alli Mia Fora
"Athena"	2001	Die for You
"Anihti Pligi (Why?)"	2002	Alli Mia Fora
"Come to Me"	2003	Blue Love
"Den M'agapas"	2002	Alli Mia Fora
"Dinata Dinata"	1999	Mera Me Ti Mera
"The Earth"	1999	Mera Me Ti Mera
"Ela 'Do (Come to Me)"	2002	Alli Mia Fora
"Ellatho"	1999	Mera Me Ti Mera
"Fila Me"	2001	Die for You
"Follow Me"	2001	Die for You
"Follow Me (O,ti Theleis)"	2001	Me Logia Ellinika
"Gyrna Xana"	2002	Alli Mia Fora
"I Agapi Einai Zali"	2001	Die for You
"(I Would) Die for You"	2001	Die for You
"I Zoi Einai Tora"	1999	Mera Me Ti Mera
"Kainourgia Agapi"	2001	Me Logia Ellinika
"Kalimera"	2001	Die for You
"Kardia Mou"	2002	Alli Mia Fora
"Ligo Ligo"	2001	Die for You
"List of Lovers"	2003	Blue Love
"Lonely Nights"	2001	Die for You/Blue Love
"Me Logia Ellinika"	2001	Me Logia Ellinika
"Mera Me Ti Mera"	1999	Mera Me Ti Mera
"Miazoume"	2002	Alli Mia Fora
"Mou Leipeis"	1999	Mera Me Ti Mera
"Moro Mou"	2002	Alli Mia Fora
"Moro Mou (My Baby)"	2003	Blue Love
"Mystique Antique"	1999	Mera Me Ti Mera
"No Time to Play"	1999	Mera Me Ti Mera
"Opa Opa"	1999	Mera Me Ti Mera
"O,ti Po"	2001	Me Logia Ellinika
"Pes Mou"	2002	Alli Mia Fora
"Pou Eisai Matia Mou"	2002	Alli Mia Fora
"Rhythmos" ("Opa Opa" B-Side)	1999	Opa Opa
"Se Thelo"	1999	Mera Me Ti Mera
"Set Your Body Free"	1999	Mera Me Ti Mera
"Something About You"	2001	Die for You/Blue Love
"Tabla Dreams"	2001	Die for You
"Tell Me"	2001	Die for You
"Tha Pethaina Gia Sena"	2001	Die for You
"Time to Say Goodbye"	2003	Blue Love
"Ti Sou 'Dosa, Ti Mou 'Doses"	2002	Alli Mia Fora
"Tora Tora"	2002	Alli Mia Fora
"Vima Vima"	2001	Me Logia Ellinika
"V-Power"	2002	Non-album release
"Welcome to My World"	2003	Blue Love
"Westoriental Trip"	1999	Mera Me Ti Mera
"Where Are You"	2003	Blue Love
"Why?"	2001	Die for You
"Why? (Mellan)" (with Slavi Trifonov)	2002	Blue Love
Ti Ti	2022	Digital Single

== Music videos ==
List of music videos, showing year released and director
Title	Year	Director(s)
"Opa Opa" (Original Version)	1999	Fred Wood
"Opa Opa" (International Version)	1999	Unknown
"Dinata Dinata"	1999	Unknown
"Mera Me Ti Mera"	2000	Unknown
"(I Would) Die for You"	2001	Kostas Kapetanidis
"Follow Me"	2001	Unknown
"Me Logia Ellinika"	2002	Unknown
"Kainourgia Agapi"	2002	Giorgos Gavalos
"Alli Mia Fora"	2003	Kostas Kapetanidis
"Moro Mou"	2003	Giorgos Gavalos
"Why?" (featuring Slavi Trifonov and Ku-Ku Band)	2003	Unknown
"Antique Hitmix"	2004	Unknown

== See also ==
- Elena Paparizou discography
