= Ligo Ligo (Antique song) =

Single by Antique

from the album Die For You and Me Logia Ellinika
- Language: Greek
- Released: 2001
- Genre: Laïko, Eurodance
- Length: 3:26
- Label: Bonnier Music
- Songwriters: Alex Papaconstantinou, Andreas Unge
- Producers: C&N Project

Antique singles chronology
| "Die For You" (2001) | "Ligo Ligo" (2001) | "Moro Mou" (2002) |

"Ligo Ligo" is a single released by Antique.

== Track listing ==
1. "Ligo Ligo" (Eric S Radio) - 3:26
2. "Ligo Ligo" (Original Radio) - 3:41
3. "Ligo Ligo" (Wonder Mix) - 7:51
4. "Ligo Ligo" (Eric S Extended) - 6:16
5. "Ligo Ligo" (M 12 Remix) - 5:49

== Release history ==
| Country | Date |
|---|---|
| Greece | 2001 |
| Sweden | 2001 |

== Charts ==
"Ligo Ligo" entered the Swedish Top 60 Singles Chart on the week of September 7, 2001 at number 54. It stayed on the chart for four weeks straight peaking at number 48 in its second week.

| Chart | Providers | Peak position |
|---|---|---|
| Swedish Top 60 Singles | Sverigetopplistan | 48 |
