= Time to Say Goodbye =

Time to Say Goodbye may refer to:

- "Time to Say Goodbye", an English version of Andrea Bocelli's song "Con te partirò", with Sarah Brightman
- Time to Say Goodbye (album), 1997, by Sarah Brightman
- Time to Say Goodbye?, a 1997 American film
- "Time to Say Goodbye" (Antique song), 2003
- "Natsu no Yuu-utsu (Time to Say Good-bye)", a 1995 song by L'Arc-en-Ciel
- "Time to Say Goodbye", an episode of the 2018 Indian TV series Karenjit Kaur – The Untold Story of Sunny Leone

== See also ==
- Every Time We Say Goodbye (disambiguation)
