= Antiquitates =

Antiquitates (Antiquities) may refer to the short title of the following works:

- Antiquitates, three works by William Burton (antiquary, died 1645)
- Antiquitates Americanæ (1837), Carl Christian Rafn
- Antiquitates Asiaticae (1728), by Edmund Chishull
- Antiquitates Judaicae (AD 93/94), by Flavius Josephus
- Antiquitates Rutupinae, by John Battely (d. 1708)
- Antiquitates rerum humanarum et divinarum (1st century BC), by Varro
- Antiquitates S. Edmundi Burgi, by John Battely (d. 1708)
- Antiquitates Urbis (1527), by Andrea Fulvio
- Antiquities of the Church, by Joseph Bingham (d. 1723)
- Chronica Sive Antiquitates Glastoniensis Ecclesie (c. 1340), by John of Glastonbury
- Popular Antiquities (1728), by Henry Bourne

== See also ==
- Antiquities, old valuable objects or artifacts
- Antiquities (film), a 2018 American comedy film
- Ancient (disambiguation)
- Antique (disambiguation)
- Antiquity (disambiguation)
- Classical antiquity
