= Me Logia Ellinika =

2001 studio album by Antique

Studio album by Antique
- Released: December 2001
- Genre: Laïko; Eurodance
- Language: Greek; English
- Label: V2
- Producer: C&N Project; Christodoulos Siganos; Kiriakos Papadopoulos; Yannis Doulamis; Per Adebratt

Antique chronology
Die for You (2001)	Me Logia Ellinika (2001)	Dance: Re-mixes + Videos (2002)

Singles from Antique
- 1. "Follow Me"; 2. "Me Logia Ellinika"; 3. "Kainourgia Agapi"

Me Logia Ellinika (Greek: Με Λόγια Ελληνικά; English: With Greek Words) is the first all-Greek album by Greek musical group Antique. The album was released in December 2001 by V2 Records. The album contains 6 new songs in Greek and 4 new dance remixes. The first single, "Follow Me", was released with a music video and was one of the year's hits. Also included are "Adiko Kai Krima" featuring Katy Garbi and the music videos of "Follow Me" and "(I Would) Die for You".

== Track listing ==
No.	Title	Writer(s)	Producer(s)	Length
1.	"Follow Me ('O,ti Theleis)" ('Ο,τι Θέλεις; Whatever you want)	Alex Papaconstantinou, Andreas Unge, Andreas Kleerup	C&N Project	3:28
2.	"Me Logia Ellinika" (Με Λόγια Ελληνικά; With Greek words)	Christodoulos Siganos	Siganos	3:30
3.	"Kainourgia Agapi" (Καινούργια Αγάπη; New love)	Kiriakos Papadopoulos, Natalia Germanou	Papadopoulos	4:05
4.	"Vima-Vima" (Βήμα-Βήμα; Step by step)	Papadopoulos, Ilias Filippou	Papadopoulos	3:50
5.	"Adiko Kai Krima" (Άδικο Και Κρίμα; Unfair and pity, featuring Katy Garbi)	Nikos Terzis, Antonis Pappas	Yannis Doulamis	5:30
6.	"'Oti Po" (Ότι Πω; Whatever I say)	Siganos, Evi Droutsa	Siganos	3:35
7.	"Ligo-Ligo (Eric S Extended)" (Λίγο-Λίγο; Little by little)	Papaconstantinou, Unge	C&N Project	6:15
8.	"Mera Me Ti Mera (Extended Version)" (Μέρα Με Τη Μέρα; Day by day)	Christer Carlsson, Nicklas Olausson, Christer Sandelin, Tommy Ekman, Pontus Frisk	C&N Project & Per Adebratt	5:07
9.	"Dinata-Dinata (Jonas S Club Mix)" (Δυνατά-Δυνατά; Strong-Strong)	Ara Dinkjian, Lina Nikolakopoulou	C&N Project & Adebratt	5:06
10.	"Opa-Opa (Extended Version)" (Οπα-Οπα)	Giorgos Alkaios	C&N Project & Adebratt	5:00
11.	"Follow Me ('O,ti Theleis)" (video)
12.	"(I Would) Die for You" (video)
