= Mera Me Ti Mera (song) =

Single by Antique

from the album Mera Me Ti Mera and Me Logia Ellinika
- Language: Greek
- Released: 2000 (Greece, Sweden)
- Genre: Laïko, Eurodance
- Label: Bonnier Music
- Songwriters: Christer Carlsson, Christer Sandelin, Niclas Olausson, Pontus Frisk, Tommy Eckman
- Producers: C&N Project & Adebratt

Antique singles chronology
"Dinata Dinata" (1999)	"Mera Me Ti Mera" (2000)	"Die For You" (2001)

"Mera Me Ti Mera" (Greek: Μέρα με τη μέρα; English: Day by day) is a single released by Antique. It reached #45 on the Swedish singles chart.

== Track listing ==
1. "Mera Me Ti Mera" (Radio Version) - 3:13
2. "Mera Me Ti Mera" (Extended Version) - 5:08

== Charts ==
Chart (1999)	Peak position
Sweden (Sverigetopplistan)	45
