= Ancient (disambiguation) =

Ancient or ancients may refer to:

People or things from antiquity:

- Ancient history, from the beginning of writing to the Middle Ages
- Prehistory, from the use of the first stone tools until the beginning of writing

It may also refer to:

== As a proper name ==
- Ancient (band), a melodic black metal musical group
- Ancient (company), a Japanese software developer
- Ancients (art group), a group of English artists in the 1820s and 1830s
- Ancient (album), a 2001 album by Kitarō

== In fiction ==
- Ancient (Stargate), a race who built the Stargates in the Stargate universe
- Ancient (Traveller), a mysterious race that once dominated the galaxy in the Traveller role-playing game
- Ancients (Eternal Darkness), a god-like race in Eternal Darkness: Sanity's Requiem
- Ancients (Legacy of Kain), a race in the Legacy of Kain games
- Ancients, an advanced species in the FreeSpace space simulation computer game series
- Ancients, a race in the Farscape TV series
- Ancients, a variety of creatures and structures in Defense of the Ancients and Dota 2
- Ancients or Cetra in Final Fantasy VII
- The Ancients, a race of highly advanced worldcrafters in the Might and Magic universe

== Other ==
- A corrupt form of the military rank of ensign used during the 16th century in Britain

== See also ==
- Antiquity (disambiguation)
- Ancien (disambiguation)
- List of time periods
- Timeline of ancient history
