= Die for You (album) =

Studio album by Antique
- Released: 19 June 2001
- Recorded: 2000–2001
- Genre: Contemporary laïka; laïka dance-pop
- Length: 45:51
- Label: V2
- Producer: C&N Project

Antique chronology
Antique (2000)	Die for You (2001)	Me Logia Ellinika (2001)

Die for You/Tha Pethaina Gia Sena
- Cover of the Greek edition

Singles from Antique
- 1. "(I Would) Die for You"; 2. "Follow Me"; 3. "Ligo Ligo"; 4. "Why"

Die for You, also known as Die for You/Tha Pethaina Gia Sena in the Greek market, is the name of the second studio album by Greek musical group Antique. The album was released on 19 June 2001 by V2 Records. A number of the songs are featured on all three of Antique's follow-up albums. "Follow Me (O,ti Theleis)" was used as the first single from Me Logia Ellinika while a Greek version of "Why" was a single from Alli Mia Fora. Other songs from the album were included on the duo's final studio/compilation album Blue Love. "I Agapi Ine Zali", originally "I Agapi Ine Zali (Na Mou To Peis)", is a cover of Haris Alexiou.

== Track listing ==
No.	Title	Writer(s)	Producer(s)	Length
1.	"(I Would) Die for You"	Nikos Terzis, Antonis Pappas	C&N Project	2:58
2.	"Follow Me"	Alex Papaconstantinou, Andreas Unge, Andreas Kleerup	C&N Project	4:27
3.	"Athena" (Αθηνά; Athens)	Christer Carlsson, Niklas Olausson, Niklas Lundqvist, Andreas Romdhane, Josef Larossi	C&N Project	3:52
4.	"Ligo – Ligo"" (Λίγο - Λίγο, Little by little)	Papaconstantinou, Unge	C&N Project	3:41
5.	"I Agapi Einai Zali" (Η Αγάπη Είναι Ζάλη; Love is a dizziness)	Thanos Mikroutsikos, Andreas Mikroutsikos	C&N Project	3:15
6.	"Tell Me"	Carlsson, Olausson, Elena Paparizou	C&N Project	3:27
7.	"Lonely Nights"	Carlsson, Olausson, Lunqvist, Romdhane	C&N Project	3:40
8.	"Filla Me" (Φίλλα Με; Kiss me)	Papaconstantinou, Unge	C&N Project	4:18
9.	"Something About You"	Carlsson, Olausson, David Kreuger, Paparizou	C&N Project	3:32
10.	"Kalimera" (Καλημέρα; Good morning)	Papaconstantinou, Kleerup	C&N Project	3:43
11.	"Why (Mellan)"	Carlsson, Olausson, Lundqvist, Paparizou	C&N Project	4:50

Bonus tracks
No.	Title	Writer(s)	Producer(s)	Length
12.	"(I Would) Die For You (Greek version)"	Terzis, Pappas	C&N Project	2:59
13.	"Tabla Dreams"	Carlsson, Olausson, Papaconstantinou	C&N Project	1:09

== Charts ==
Chart	Peak position
Swedish Albums Charts	16
