= Antique (disambiguation) =

An antique is an old collectible item

Antique may also refer to:

- Antique (band), a Greek-Swede musical group
  - Antique (EP), 2000 release by the duo
- Antique (film), a 2008 South Korean film
- The Antique (2014 film), a film starring Olu Jacobs and Bimbo Akintola
- The Antique (2024 film), a drama film set in Russia and Georgia
- Antiques (magazine), a monthly arts publication
- Antique (province), a province of the Philippines in the Western Visayas region

== See also ==
- Antiquity (disambiguation)
- Antiqua, a typeface class
