= Collector's Edition =

A Collector's Edition is a common name of a special edition or collector's edition

Collector's Edition may also refer to:

- Limited Collectors' Edition, a comic book series published by DC Comics in the 1970s
- Children of the Corn: The Collector's Edition
- Collector's Edition (Antique album)
- Poison – Box Set (Collector's Edition)
- Sinatra: Collector's Edition 2009
- Collector's Edition No. 1 debut EP by L.A. Guns
- Carly Simon Collector's Edition
- Limited Collector's Edition, an album by Glen Campbell
