= Meno Ektos =

Eminem Menő

Studio album by Eleftheria Arvanitaki
- Released: 1991
- Genre: Laika
- Labels: PolyGram Greece, Polydor

Eleftheria Arvanitaki chronology
Tanirama (1989)	Eminem Menő (1991)	I Nihta Katavainei (1993)

Meno Ektos (English title: I Still Remain An Outcast; Greek: Μένω Εκτός) is an album by popular Greek artist Eleftheria Arvanitaki. It was released in 1991 and it is her fourth personal album. It went gold in Greece, selling over 50,000 copies; It spawned "Dinata" (Greek: Δυνατά) and "Me To Idio Mako" (Greek: Με το ίδιο μακό), two of her signature songs.The lyrics of the album's songs, except Σαν Δεύτερη Φωνή (English title: Like a backing voice) and "Κύμα το κύμα" (English title: Wave after wave) who have been written by Thodoris Gonis and Yiorgos Zikas respectively, were written by Lina Nikolakopoulou; the music composers are Ara Dinkjian, Adonis Mitzelos, Christos Nikolopoulos, Zoran Simganovic, George Zikas and Nikos Xydakis.

== Track listing ==
1. "Meno Ektos"
2. "Kardia Mou Ego"
3. "Prosopo Me Prosopo"
4. "San Defteri Foni"
5. "Kima To Kima"
6. "Dinata"
7. "Omorfi Mou Agapi"
8. "Me To Idio Mako"
9. "Kathrefti To Nou"
10. "Tis Kalinihtas Ta Filia"
11. "Den Apanta"
