= Opa (song) =

2010 single by Giorgos Alkaios

Single by Giorgos Alkaios
- Released: 26 February 2010
- Genre: Laïko
- Length: 3:02
- Label: Friends Music Factory
- Songwriters: Giorgos Alkaios; Giannis Antoniou; Friends (Dimitris Hortarias; Manos Hortarias; Dionisis Shinas; Tolis Sxoinas; Kassiani Karagioule; Stavros Apostolou)
- Producer: Giorgos Alkaios

Eurovision Song Contest 2010 entry
- Country: Greece
- Artist: Giorgos Alkaios
- Languages: Greek, English
- Composer: Giorgos Alkaios
- Lyricists: Giannis Antoniou & Friends

Finals performance
- Semi-final result: 2nd
- Semi-final points: 133
- Final result: 8th
- Final points: 140

Entry chronology
- ◄ "This Is Our Night" (2009)
- "Watch My Dance" (2011) ►

Official performance video
- "OPA (Final) on YouTube

"Opa" (Greek: ΏΠΑ!, IPA: [ˈopa]) is a song recorded by Greek singer Giorgos Alkaios. The song was written by Giorgos Alkaios himself, Giannis Antoniou, Dimitris Hortarias, Manos Hortarias, Dionisis Shinas, Tolis Sxoinas, Kassiani Karagioule and Stavros Apostolou. It is best known as the Greek entry at the Eurovision Song Contest 2010, held in Oslo.

The song was released by broadcaster Hellenic Broadcasting Corporation (ERT) on 26 February 2010 along with the other candidate songs from the national final, while a digital download was released on 12 March 2010 in association with Universal Music Greece.

== Background and composition ==
Alkaios had originally written the music to the song about two years prior, with no intention of submitting it for the Eurovision Song Contest at the time. After lyricist Giannis Antoniou heard the music a year later, he and asked Alkaios to write lyrics for it. In the process, other musicians and employees from Friends Music Factory including Dionisis Shinas, Kassiani Kargiule, Dimitris Hortarias, Stavros Apostolou, Tolis Schinas, and Manos Hortarias amongst others, wrote and contributed half of the lyrics for the song. Upon completion, good friend and musician Dionisis Shinas along with Giannis Antoniou urged Alkaios to submit the song to broadcaster ERT to take part in the national final. Originally only intending to be the composer of the song, Alkaios agreed to submit the song, and Schinas hand delivered the song to ERT's offices. Later, it was decided that Alkaios would perform the song on stage along with "friends".

The entry marks the first Greek Eurovision entry since 1998 to be sung entirely in Greek. "Opa" is a Greek interjection used to express joy or high spirits, especially when dancing. According to Alkaios, 'Opa' is a happy word and just what people need in a time of trouble. The song is all about leaving the past behind and starting all over again. In a world shaken by the 2008 economic circumstances, Alkaios believes people just needed to say 'Opa' and move on. Pertaining to the tie of 'Opa' in the song with the current economic situation in the world, Alkaios stated:

I think Greek people want to say an 'Opa' and get out and ... you know, break a plate, and you know, very ... with dance, and feelings, and smile. Live or leave it. This is the word that we sing.

== Music video and promotion ==
Due to economic difficulties that the national Greek television (ERT) was facing, the broadcaster was only willing to use the national final performance as the official music video for the song which was released on 19 March 2010. Although ERT released a music video for the song from the live performance, Alkaios financed the production of another music video which was directed by Sherif Francis. The music video was shot in Milos.

== Eurovision Song Contest ==
=== Ellinikós Telikós 2010 ===
Seven acts competed on 12 March 2010 in the Greek National Final. The song was performed fourth in the final by Alkaios along with "Friends", which consisted of musicians Gogua Iakovos, Evgenios Buli, Petros Zlatkos and Anastasios Kanaridis who acted as backing vocalists and backing dancers, along with Lazos Ioannidis who plays the lyre during the song's break.

At the end of voting, "Opa" was revealed as the winner.

Draw	Artist	Song	Place
1	Christos Hatzinasios	"Illusion"	-
2	Sunny Baltzi & Second Skin	"Game of Life"	-
3	Manos Pyrovolakis feat. Eleni Foureira	"Kivotos tou Noe" (Noah's ark)	2
4	Giorgos Alkaios & Friends	"Opa"	1
5	Yorgos Karadimos	"Polemao" (I'm fighting)	3
6	Melisses	"O Kinezos" (Chinese)	-
7	Émigré	"Touch me Deep Inside"	-

=== In Oslo ===
Greece competed 13th in the second half of the first semi-final of the contest on 25 May in Oslo, Norway. The performance in the contest differed from the one in the national final. Alkaios passed the first semi-final, coming in 2nd place, behind Belgium, and went on to perform in the final on 29 May 2010. In the end, Greece came 8th, with 141 points, while for most of the duration of the voting, Greece was in the top 3 (and even came 1st for a while). It was the highest placing non-English song of the contest. "Opa" was the most popular song for the jury in the United Kingdom, being awarded the full 12 points. Following Eurovision, "Opa" was formally adopted by Bournemouth University in the UK as their fieldwork anthem on the excavation programme throughout June and July 2010.

== Track listing ==
- Digital download
1. "Opa" – 3:02

== Release history ==
Region	Date	Label	Format
Greece	26 February 2010	Friends Music Factory	Airplay
Cyprus	26 February 2010	Friends Music Factory	Airplay
Greece	12 March 2010	Universal Music, Friends Music Factory	Digital download
Cyprus	12 March 2010	Universal Music, Friends Music Factory	Digital download

== Charts ==
Chart (2010)	Peak position
Belgian (Flanders) Singles Chart	37
Finnish Singles Chart	20
Greek Digital Singles Chart	4
UK Singles Chart	110

== Cover versions ==
The Israeli Mizrahi singer Omer Adam released a version of this song in the Hebrew language in October 2010 called "Hopa". The song is also a track from his debut album, Names Mimeh.

== See also ==
- "Opa Opa", a 1992 song by Notis Sfakianakis
