= Mera Me Ti Mera =

Studio album by Antique
- Released: 1999
- Genre: Pop; Europop; modern laïka
- Length: 43:18
- Label: V2; Bonnier
- Producer: C&N Project; Per Aderbratt; Jonas Scheldt; Pontus Frisk

Antique chronology
Mera Me Ti Mera (1999)	Antique (2000)

Opa Opa

Mera Me Ti Mera (Greek: Μέρα με τη μέρα; English: Day by Day) or Opa Opa (in Scandinavia) is the debut album by Greek musical group Antique. The album was released in 1999 by V2 Records in Greece, and by Bonnier Music in Scandinavia.

== Track listing ==
No.	Title	Writer(s)	Producer(s)	Length
1.	"Mystique Antique"	Jonas Scheldt	Jonas Scheldt	1:38
2.	"Dinata - Dinata" (Δυνατά - Δυνατά; Strong - Strong/Loud - Loud)	A. Dinkjian, L. Nikolakopoulou	C&N Project & Adebratt	3:17
3.	"Opa Opa" (Οπα Οπα)	Giorgos Alkaios	C&N Project & Adebratt	3:34
4.	"Mera Me Ti Mera" (Μέρα Με Τη Μέρα; Day by day)	Christer Carlsson, Nicklas Olausson, Christer Sandelin, Tommy Ekman, Pontus Frisk	C&N Project & Adebratt	3:34
5.	"Se Thelo" (Σε Θέλω; I want you)	Carlsson, Olausson, Per Adebratt, Frisk, Elena Paparizou, Nikos Panagiotidis	C&N Project & Adebratt	3:16
6.	"I Zoi Einai Tora" (Η Ζωή Είναι Τώρα; Life is now)	Carlsson, Olausson, Paparizou, Frisk	C&N Project & Pontus Frisk	3:06
7.	"No Time To Play"	Carlsson, Olausson	C&N Project	4:21
8.	"Ela' Do" (Έλα' Δω; Come here)	Carlsson, Olausson, Sandelin, Ekman, Frisk	C&N Project	3:13
9.	"Set Your Body Free"	Carlsson, Olausson	C&N Project	5:28
10.	"Mou Leipeis" (Μου Λείπεις; I miss you)	Nikos Terzis, A. Pappas	C&N Project & Adebratt	4:11
11.	"Summer Jam (vocal: Thodoris Ferris)"	Carlsson, Olausson, The Underdog Project	C&N Project, V. Krishna	3:30
12.	"Half A Woman"	S. Moshirian, Carlsson, Olausson	V. Krishna	3:56
13.	"For The Ladies (feat. Thodoris Ferris)"	Carlsson, Olausson, S. Moshirian	C&N Project, V. Krishna	3:41
14.	"No More (Accapella Skid)"	The Underdog Project, Carlsson, Olausson	V. Krishna	2:56

== Singles ==
"Opa Opa"

"Opa Opa" was the first CD single from the album and the debut song by Antique. It included the radio edit and an extended version along with the B-side "Rhythmos". "Opa Opa" reached gold certification in Sweden.

"Dinata Dinata"

"Dinata Dinata" was the second CD single from the album. It was a cover of Eleftheria Arvanitaki's song of the same name and was sung at the closing ceremony for the 2004 Olympics, during the fireworks after the flame was extinguished.

"Mera Me Ti Mera"

"Mera Me Ti Mera" was the third single from the album. It was released as a CD single with an extended version and a music video was made.
