= Dance: Re-mixes + Videos =

EP by Antique
- Released: 2002
- Genre: Pop; modern laïka; dance
- Label: Bonnier Amigo

Antique chronology
Me Logia Ellinika (2001)	Dance: Re-mixes + Videos (2002)	Alli Mia Fora (2002)

Dance: Re-mixes + Videos is a remix EP released by Antique.

== Track listing ==
1. Hit Express Medley: "Kainourgia Agapi", "Opa Opa", "Follow Me", "Dynata Dynata", "Die for You"
2. "Me Logia Ellinika" (Club Mix)
3. "Westoriental Trip"
4. "Kainourgia Agapi" (Video Clip)
5. "Me Logia Ellinika" (Video Clip)
