= Namess Mimekh =

Namess Mimekh נמס ממך

Studio album by Omer Adam
- Released: (Israel) 2010
- Recorded: 2009–2010

Singles from Namess Mimekh

Namess Mimekh (in Hebrew נמס ממך) is the debut album of Israeli vocalist Omer Adam released in 2010. The album was released a year after Adam participated in the Israeli reality show, Kokhav Nolad, and got disqualified from the show because he was younger than 16 years old, the minimum age of participation.

Five singles were released from the album. One of them, "Neshima," a song with Esti Ginzburg made it to the top of the Israeli Singles Chart. Another song, "Kol ma SheRatziti," made it to #2 in the same charts.

== Track list ==
Transliterated title	Title in Hebrew	Length
Names Mimeh	נמס ממך	3:53
Leheabed BaRuah	להיאבד ברוח	3:18
Al Tivki	אל תבכי	3:58
Hopa	הופה	3:03
At Belibi	את בליבי	3:13
Netzah Letzideh	נצח לצידך	3:46
BeLaila Kar	בלילה קר	3:46
Lo Tedi Dimaa	לא תדעי דמעה	3:18
Nati Betoh Maagal	נעתי בתוך מעגל	4:24
Hoze BaNeshama	חוזה בנשמה	

Remixes (bonus)

Transliterated title	Title in Hebrew	Length
"Hopa" (Remix)	הופה (Remix)	3:52
"Namess Mimekh" (Remix)	נמס ממך (Remix)	4:03
"Leheabed BaRuah" (Remix)	להיאבד ברוח (Remix)	3:00
"Al Tivki" (Remix)	אל תבכי (Remix)	3:54
"Netzah Letzideh" (Remix)	נצח לצידך (Remix)	3:43
