= Michalis Rakintzis =

Greek singer (born 1957)

Michalis Rakintzis Μιχάλης Ρακιντζής
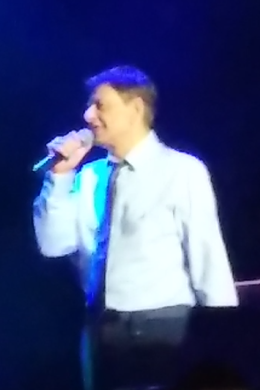

Background information
- Born: 3 April 1957 (age 69); Athens, Greece
- Origin: Athens, Greece
- Genres: New wave, alternative rock, power metal
- Occupation: Musician
- Instruments: Vocals, guitars, keyboards
- Years active: 1987–present
- Label: Minos EMI

Michalis Rakintzis (Greek: Μιχάλης Ρακιντζής; born 3 April 1957) is a Greek singer. He was born in Athens and studied mechanical engineering in the United Kingdom. From 1982 to 1985, he participated in a rock group called Scraptown. After three albums and a maxi single, Scraptown split up and Rakintzis started a solo career.

Readers of the music magazine Popcorn voted him "Best singer of the Year" in 1991. Rakintzis worked with international stars such as Ian Gillan from Deep Purple, rock singer Bonnie Tyler and Wee Papa Girl Rappers. He has also written songs for other Greek artists, such as Paschalis, Eleni Dimou, Dimitris Kontolazos, Sophia Arvaniti, Stelios Dionisiou, and Vassilis Karras.

Mihalis participated in the Eurovision Song Contest 2002 in Tallinn with the song "S.A.G.A.P.O." (I Love You), which took 17th place.

== Discography ==
=== International discography ===
Albums

- 1982 – Scraptown
- 1983 – Rules of the Game
- 1985 – Give Me a Break

Singles

- 1984 – "Viva Sahara" (maxi single-promo edition)

=== Local discography ===
Albums

- 1987 – Moro Mou Faltso (with Eleni Demou)
- 1988 – Isovia
- 1989 – Dikaioma Gia Mia + Mia
- 1989 – Dikaioma Gia Mia + Mia "Second Edition" with bonus track "Nana"
- 1990 – Apagogi
- 1990 – Apagogi 'Special Cd Edition'
- 1991 – Na Eisai Ekei
- 1992 – Etsi M' Aresei (with Ian Gillan)
- 1994 – Ethinikos
- 1995 – H Proti Apeili
- 1996 – Trance Mix
- 1997 – Se Ena Vrady oti Zisoume (with Vasilis Karras)
- 1997 – Se Ena Vrady oti Zisoume "Special Edition" with bonus track "Beba"
- 1998 – Kathreftis
- 1999 – Ton Filo Sou Zilevo
- 2001 – Oneiro 13
- 2002 – S.A.G.A.P.O.
- 2003 – Solo (2cds) (First CD – new songs, second CD – remakes of older songs)
- 2005 – Bar Code (with T.D.A./Talenta Dihos Avrio and Afroditi Delgado)
- 2006 – Made in Greece (with Trilogy)
- 2008 – Energia (with Trilogy)
- 2011 – Back to the Φuture "Black Edition" (with Sofia Arvaniti, Alex Trigs (English lyrics), Nadia Zahoor (Indian lyrics), Dimitra Tsalopoulou)
- 2011 – Back to the Φuture "White Edition" (with Sofia Arvaniti, Alex Trigs (English lyrics), Nadia Zahoor (Indian lyrics), Dimitra Tsalopoulou)
- 2012 – HardStyle (released online)

Singles

- 1987 – "Moro Mou Faltso"
- 1992 – "Get Away" (with Ian Gillan)
- 1995 – "Kardoula Mou Ego Ki Esy"
- 1997 – "Beba"
- 1998 – "Se Ena Katastroma"
- 2000 – "Oti Kaneis Sou Kano"
- 2002 – "S.A.G.A.P.O." (maxi single-Promo Europe Edition) (released in Europe)
- 2002 – "S.A.G.A.P.O." (maxi single-Limited Edition)
- 2002 – "S.A.G.A.P.O." (maxi single-Special Edition)
- 2004 – "Geysi Apo Sena" (maxi single-Internet Edition)
- 2008 – "Erfoi" (maxi single-Internet Edition)
- 2013 – "Hardstyle2" (maxi-single released online)

=== Soundtrack appearances ===
- 1988 – Isovia (original soundtrack of Giannis Dalianidis)
- 2010 – Show Bitch (original soundtrack of Nikos Zervos)

=== Compilation albums ===
- 1992 – The Very Best of Mihalis Rakintzis
- 2006 – Dekatessera Megala Tragoudia
- 2006 – Dekatessera Megala Tragoudia "Second Edition" (with other cover)
- 2006 – Etsi Ksafnika (2cds)

=== Music for TV ===
- Music composition titles for comic ERT2 TV series I Alepou Kai O Mpoufos/The Fox and the Fool (with George Constantine, Giovanna Fragouli, Dina Consta, Carmen Ruggeri, Dimitra Papadopoulou, Tasos Kostis, etc.) (1987–1988) the series aired in 1989 in Australia by SBS entitled "The Fox and the Fool"
- Music composition titles for the film Panos Michalopoulos – "Ena Moro Sto Taxi Mou/A Baby in My Taxi" (1989)
- Music composition titles for the program Greek Style/Styl gr by Theodore Rakitzis ("Savvato Vrady/Saturday Night" title track)
- Music composition titles for the program of the Constantina Stephanopoulou ("Geysi Zois/Taste of Life" the title track)
- Music composition titles for the program of the Christina Lambiri Super Star of Star Channel (Mihalis Rakintzis – Christina Lambiri, Theodore Rakitzis, Henry Petilon) (2006–2011)
- Music composition for advertising "Jannis" nougat (2011)

=== Music for children ===
- 2002 with the song "To Dialeimma/The Break" the album of children's book writer and musician Letta Vasileiou and the Timos Papasokratis entitled Asimoprasino Dasos/Silver Green Forest – The School of Animal (Acroasis 2002)

Preceded by Antique with "(I Would) Die for You"	Greece in the Eurovision Song Contest; 2002	Succeeded by Mando with "Never Let You Go"
