= Giannis Vassiliou =

Greek Laïko singer (born 1950)

- Born: Ioannis Vassiliou; 1 January 1950 (age 76); Salamina, Attica, Greece
- Genres: Laïko
- Occupation: Musician
- Label: Real Music Greece

Giannis Vassiliou (Γιάννης Βασιλείου, born 1950 in Salamina) is a Greek Laïko singer. He released around two dozens of full-length albums, mostly on Alpha Records. Ten of his albums were certified Gold and one Platinum. His son, Giorgos Alkaios, is also a successful singer.

== Discography ==
- 1980 - Ακόμα τη θυμάμαι
- 1983 - Σ' αγαπώ καταλαβαίνεις
- 1984 - Με όλα τα χαρίσματα
- 1988 - Παραισθήσεις +1
- 1990 - Σαν να μην έφυγες ποτέ
- 1991 - Μια Βραδιά για Κέφι και Χορό
- 1991 - Φήμες
- 1992 - Όλα θα στα Μάθω
- 1993 - Τη Λένε Λόλα
- 1994 - Έξαψη
- 1995 - Μαντήλι
- 1996 - Γιατί Μαλώνουμε
- 1997 - Να πας Κορίτσι μου
- 1998 - Λέει Λέει
- 1998 - Το Κάτι Άλλο
- 1999 - Είσαι Μωρό
- 1999 - Ούτε Ένα Βλέμμα
- 2000 - Είπα
- 2001 - Απόφαση Ζωής
- 2002 - Οι Χρυσές Επιτυχίες
- 2003 - Χαλάλι σου
- 2004 - Live
- 2005 - Με Καις με Καις
- 2006 - Το Καλύτερο Παιδί
- 2008 - Χωρίς Εσένα
- 2009 - Σπάστα όλα
- 2011 - Με Αγάπη
- 2013 - Παίξε Μπάλα

=== Single ===
- 2013 - Δεν Μπορώ Να Σε Ξεχάσω
- 2014 - Γούστα
- 2014 - Ψεματάκια
- 2017 - Άλλον Αγαπάει
- 2017 - Θα Με Θυμάσαι
- 2018 - Έχω Σουξέ Μεγάλο
- 2019 - Μεθάω με έρωτα
- 2020 - Όλα στον αέρα
- 2021 - Μάγισσα
- 2021 - Πρέπει Να Αλλάξω Ουρανό
- 2022 - Τικ Τοκ
- 2022 - Μην Τον Πειράζεις Τον Τρελό
