= Gennethleia =

"Genethlia" (Greek: Γενέθλια) is a Greek song last covered by Notis Sfakianakis. The song is in the zeibekiko style, meaning that it is played to a 9/8 beat.

== The original version ==
The song first appeared as Genethlia (Γενέθλια) in 2001 on an album called H Fygi, released by Cretan singer and lyra player Stelios Bikakis. Despite the song's obvious credentials, it failed to reach the widespread popularity it deserved on account of Bikakis’ relatively low profile. However, the song did cause some debate with regards to its origin: what terrible suffering inspired such sombre lyrics? Some theories abounded, but none were confirmed to be true. However, five years after the release, Bikakis finally revealed the truth behind the song. Not long after the circulation of his previous album, Bikakis’ son Giorgos contracted a rare disease, which is believed to befall only every one millionth person. During a very difficult period for Bikakis and his wife Amalia, the former wrote a song that would touch the soul of every person to hear it. Bikakis narrated the event as follows (roughly translated from Greek):

“In this difficult phase of my life, I transferred to paper what I was holding inside of me. In the words I wrote my emotions. I did not mean it as a song, but after a short while my father died, and so I formed the mass of words into lyrics. In 2000 I recorded it onto disc. That’s how Genethlia was born, which was loved so much, despite the reference to death. They are words taken from my soul, even if many remain accusatory about one word only, the word ‘poutana’ (whore). Everyone likes it – youngsters, adults, even grandmothers, which encourages me even more.”

== The Sfakianakis version ==
Four years after its original release, the song was covered by the popular and critically acclaimed Notis Sfakianakis. This version was also entitled Genethlia, and it appeared on the album Me Agapi O,ti Kaneis. The track would come to be accepted as one of the finest zeimbekiko songs in living memory, and was performed live in concerts by a variety of Greek artists, including Thanos Petrelis, Nikos Makropoulos, Panos Kiamos and Panagiotis Rafaillidis

== Sfakianakis vs. Bikakis ==
The two versions of the song have created a debate which still rages. Many claim that the passion that Bikakis presents in his version tips the scales in his favor; that, as the creator of the song, it is closer to his heart and that the meaning is more apparent in his voice. However, many say that Bikakis simply is no match for a voice like Sfakianakis’. The argument tends to go more often than not to the Sfakianakis camp, but mainly on account of the imbalance of profiles: even after the release of the song Bikakis remained a relative unknown to the majority of Greeks, enjoying fame only amongst a select few listeners of refined taste, and he generally shuns the limelight. On the contrary, Sfakianakis is the subject of a huge fan base, and in Greece he is a true celebrity in every sense.

== The relationship between Sfakianakis and Bikakis ==
The second release of Genethlia was done only with Bikakis’ blessing. In fact, he even contributed with an introduction on his lyra. Some accusations of jealousy on Bikakis’ part have proven completely unfounded – he has always been quick to point out that Sfakianakis has never claimed the song as his own, and has always credited Bikakis as being the composer and first performer of the song. Bikakis says that even when Sfakianakis changed one word from the original (the word ‘τριαραντάρισα’ to ‘σαραντάρισα’) he made a point of asking permission first. In fact, Bikakis claims that Sfakianakis’ endorsement of him is the one factor that has made him famous in all of Greece – “I don’t like being ungrateful.” Bikakis said in a 2005 interview.

One year after the release of the song by Notis Sfakianakis, Sfakianakis brother Giorgos, whose idea it was for Sfakianakis to perform that song, died at the age of 47.

In 2004, the year of the release of Sfakianakis' version, Sfakianakis had himself suffered the loss of his brother Giorgos.

== Note on name ==
The spelling of the original version that appeared on I Fygi in 2001 was Γενέθλια (Genethlia). This is also how it appeared on Me Agapi O,ti Kaneis in 2004. However, in 2006, the song appeared on the CD single disc Koinonia Ora as Γεννέθλεια (Gennethleia). The word (which translates as Birthday) is correctly spelt in Greek as Γενέθλια (the alternative spelling does not exist in Modern Greek). It is unclear why the spelling was changed, two years after the release, but is most likely due to a desire by Sfakianakis to allow listeners to properly differentiate between his version and Bikakis’.
