= Lina Nikolakopoulou =

Lina Nikolakopoulou Λίνα Νικολακοπούλου
- Born: Evangelia Nikolakopoulou; June 30, 1957 (age 69); Methana, Greece
- Occupation: Lyricist

Evangelia (Lina) Nikolakopoulou (Λίνα Νικολακοπούλου) is widely recognised as one of the foremost lyricists in Greece. She was born in Methana on 30 June 1957 and studied social and political sciences at the Panteion University in Athens. This is where she met the composer Stamatis Kraounakis, with whom she has made several records. Kukloforo kai Oploforo by Alkistis Protopsalti, Mama Gernao by Tania Tsanaklidou, Kratai chronia afti i kolognia (1990) composed by Thanos Mikroutsikos and sung by Haris Alexiou, Di Efchon (1992) composed by Nikos Antypas and sung by Haris Alexiou and many others are only some of the records that she has participated in.

Her collaboration with composer Adonis Mitzelos was notably featured on Eleftheria Arvanitaki's 1991 album Meno Ektos, for which they co-wrote the songs "Me to idio mako" and "Den apanta". Nikolakopoulou has described 1991 as a particularly fortunate year in her career, noting that her creative partnership with Mitzelos on Meno Ektos combined her introspective lyrics with his electric and atmospheric compositions. They continued their collaboration with the song "Cheimonas" from the album Navs ton Oneiron (1997), as well as "Zografise (Paint Away)" from Arvanitaki's internationally released album Beyond the Light (2000). Additionally, in 1998, they collaborated on the track "Apopse sou milaei to spiti" for Petros Gaitanos's solo album Gyalinos dromeas.

In 2007, she made the record Dama Coupe with Dimitra Galani. In 2008, she took a quite new band Trifono (three voices) and made a record with them.
