= Follow Me (Antique song) =

Single by Antique

from the album Die For You and Me Logia Ellinika
- Released: January 2002
- Genre: Eurodance, Laïko
- Label: Urban
- Songwriter(s): Alex Papaconstantinou, Andreas Unge, Andreas Kleerup
- Producer(s): C&N Project

Antique singles chronology
"Ligo Ligo" (2001)	"Follow Me" (2002)	"Moro Mou" (2003)

"Follow Me" is a song released by Greek-Swedish duo Antique. It was released in January 2002 as the third and final single from their album Die for You. The song reached number 15 in Sweden.

== Music video ==
A music video for the song was filmed originally in English and later in mixed Greek and English in order to promote it as a single from their album Me Logia Ellinika.

== Track listing ==
1. "Follow Me" (Radio Edit) - 3:28
2. "Follow Me" (Kosmonova Remix) - 6:33
3. "Follow Me" (Sun Divers Remix) - 8:35
4. "Follow Me" (Original Club Edit) - 8:07

== Charts ==
Chart	Peak position
Romania (Romanian Top 100)	17
Sweden (Sverigetopplistan)	15
