= Alli Mia Fora (Antique album) =

Studio album by Antique
- Released: November 10, 2002
- Recorded: 2001–2002
- Genres: Modern laïka; pop; dance
- Length: 49:57
- Label: V2
- Producers: Chippe & Wiz; Alex Papaconstantinou; Takis Damaskhis; Nicke

Antique chronology
Dance: Re-mixes + Videos (2002)	Alli Mia Fora (2002)	Collector's Edition (2003)

Singles from Antique
- 1. "Alli Mia Fora"; 2. "Moro Mou"; 3. "Why"

Alli Mia Fora (Greek: Άλλη μια φορά; English: One More Time) is the third album by Greek musical group Antique. The album was released in November 2002 by V2 Records and it became gold in Greece, their first album to do so. In 2003, many of the songs from this album were included in English on their Swedish release titled Blue Love.

== Track listing ==
No.	Title	Writer(s)	Producer(s)	Length
1.	"Moro Mou" (Μωρό Μου; My baby)	Dimitris "Funkyfly" Stamatiou	Chippe & Wiz, Alex Papaconstantinou	3:23
2.	"Ela 'Do (Come 2 Me)" (Έλα 'Δω; Come here)	Alex Papaconstantinou, Andreas Unge	Chippe & Wiz, Papaconstantinou	3:24
3.	"'Alli Mia Fora" ('Άλλη Μια Φορά; One more time)	Takis Damashis	Takis Damashis	3:52
4.	"Tora Tora" (Τώρα Τώρα; Now now)	Haris Halkitis, Argiris Koulouris, Vaggelis Karatzanos	Chippe & Wiz, Papaconstantinou	4:08
5.	"Girna Ksana" (Γύρνα Ξανά; Return again)	Halkitis, Koulouris, Andreas Bonatsos	Chippe & Wiz, Papaconstantinou	4:00
6.	"Kardia Mou" (Καρδιά Μου; My heart)	Toni Mavridis, Elena Paparizou	Chippe & Wiz	4:26
7.	"Pes Mou" (Πες Μου; Tell me)	Panos Tsapanidis	Chippe & Wizz	4:12
8.	"Moiazoume" (Μοιάζουμε; We are alike)	Damashis, Ilias Filippou	Damashis	3:56
9.	"Den M' Agapas" (Δεν Μ' Αγαπάς; You don't love me)	Chippe Carlsson, Halkitis, Natalia Germanou	Chippe & Wizz	5:13
10.	"Ti Sou 'Dosa, Ti Mou 'Doses" (Τι Σου 'Δωσα, Τι Μου 'Δωσες; What I gave you, What you gave me)	Damashis, Nikos Vaksavanelis	Chippe, Damashis	3:46
11.	"Pou Eisai Matia Mou" (Που Είσαι Μάτια Μου; Where are you my eyes)	Antonis Skokos, Nikos Sarris	Chippe & Wiz	4:22
12.	"Anoihti Pligi (Why?)" (Ανοιχτή Πληγή; Open wound)	Chippe Carlsson, Niclas Olausson, Niklas Lundqvist, Elena Paparizou, Antonis Pappas	Chippe & Nicke & Wiz	4:46

== Singles ==
"Alli Mia Fora"

The first single from the album was "Alli Mia Fora". The music video was directed by Kostas Kapetanidis. It was released as an English version called "Time to Say Goodbye" on their follow-up album Blue Love

"Moro Mou"

The second single from the album was "Moro Mou". A mixed Greek and English version was released from Blue Love called "Moro Mou (My Baby)".
