= Every Time We Say Goodbye =

Every Time We Say Goodbye may refer to:

- Every Time We Say Goodbye (film), a 1986 American drama film
- Every Time We Say Goodbye, the biography of foreign correspondent David Blundy by Anna Blundy
- "Every Time We Say Goodbye", a song by Brian McKnight from the 1997 album Anytime
- "Ev'ry Time We Say Goodbye", a jazz song with lyrics and music by Cole Porter

== See also ==
- Every Time You Say Goodbye, a 1997 album by Alison Krauss & Union Station
