= Time to Say Goodbye (Antique song) =

Single by Antique

from the album Blue Love
- B-side: "Alli Mia Fora"
- Released: August 2003
- Genre: Laïko, Eurodance
- Length: 3:53
- Label: Bonnier
- Songwriters: Takis Demaschis, Elena Paparizou

Antique singles chronology
"Moro Mou" (2003)	"Time to Say Goodbye" (2003)	"List of Lovers" (2003)

"Time to Say Goodbye" is an English language song released by Greek-Swede duo Antique. It was released as a CD Single with its Greek version titled "Alli Mia Fora" (One More Time) in 2003 by Bonnier Music in Scandinavian countries.

== Track listing ==
1. "Time to Say Goodbye" (Alli Mia Fora)(UK Radio Remix Edit) - 3:53
2. "Alli Mia Fora" (Greek Version) - 3:52

== Charts ==
"Time to Say Goodbye" entered the Swedish Top 60 Singles Chart on the week of August 29, 2003 at number fourteen. It stayed on the chart for fifteen weeks straight peaking at number thirteen in its fourth week.

=== Weekly charts ===
Chart (2003)	Peak position
Romania (Romanian Top 100)	17
Sweden (Sverigetopplistan)	13

=== Year-end charts ===
Chart (2003)	Position
Sweden (Sverigetopplistan)	79
