= Notis Sfakianakis =

Greek singer

Notis Sfakianakis Νότης Σφακιανάκης
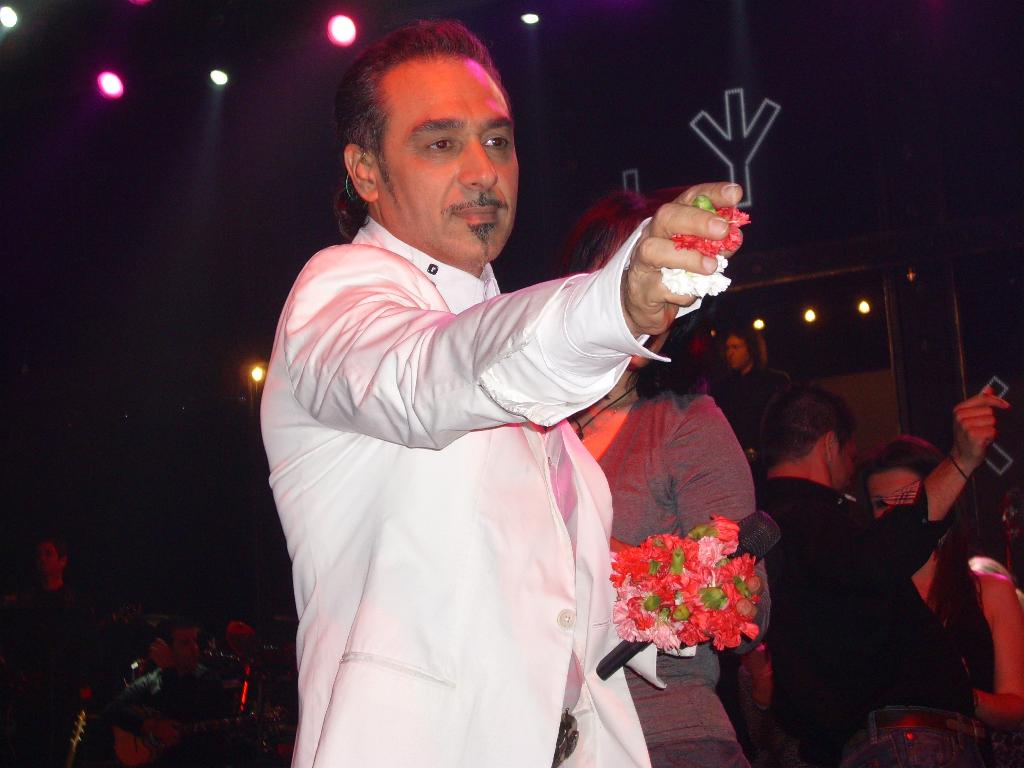
- Notis Sfakianakis performing live.

Background information
- Born: Panagiotis Sfakianakis; 2 November 1959 (age 66); Heraklion, Kingdom of Greece
- Origin: Heraklion, Greece; Kos, Greece
- Genres: Folk, Pop, Rock
- Occupation: Singer
- Instrument: Vocals
- Years active: 1985–2020
- Labels: Sony Greece, Minos EMI, Universal Greece

Panagiotis "Notis" Sfakianakis (Greek: Νότης Σφακιανάκης; born 2 November 1959) is a Greek singer of folk music, and is one of the most commercially successful artists of all time in Greece and Cyprus. Sfakianakis began his career in 1985, opening at nightclubs for other artists. He was discovered by Sony Greece and released his debut album Proti Fora in 1991.

While his first three releases were commercially successful, beginning in the mid-1990s, Sfakianakis released a series of multi-platinum albums that rank among the best-selling of all time in Greece. His signature song "O Aetos" is one of the most popular songs in Greek music history. Sfakianakis was the best selling artist of the 1990s and stands as the best selling Greek artist of his generation. However, in the 2000s he faced a significant commercial decline.

He then embarked on the Matomeno Dakry album trilogy (2009–2011). He has sold over 5 million records and in addition to these he has sold over 900 thousand copies of his albums as newspaper covermounts.

== Early life ==
After his parents divorced, when he was seven years old, Notis Sfakianakis and his mother moved to the island of Kos. Later, his mother relocated to Germany along with her new husband while Sfakianakis was visiting her and, at times, living with her. He was raised in the island of Kos by his mother's relatives and others. His schooling ended after he finished the first grade of gymnasio (first year of lower secondary education). Notis became a disc jockey in his early 20s and helped support himself by working as a waiter and, with his brother-in-law, as electrician, plumber and labourer.

In 1985 he formed a band and played in clubs in Kos. Due to their lack of success, the band broke up less than a year after being formed. In 1986 Sfakianakis moved back to Crete to start his solo singing career.

Sfakianakis is married and has two children, the family resides in Athens. In 2003, Sfakianakis had an operation on his vocal cords, leading to a two-year hiatus between his following albums, As Milisoun Ta Tragoudia, and Me Agapi O,ti Kaneis. His 2004 album Me Agapi O,ti Kaneis, illustrates Sfakianakis' mourning for his brother Giorgos, who died of cancer. His mother Mairi (Despina) Laoumtzi died on 27 June 2020.

== Career ==
Notis began opening for national acts like Poly Panou. He was discovered by Kostas Bourmas, the general manager of Sony in Greece. Bourmas signed Sfakianakis to the label, and Notis recorded his debut album Proti Fora (First Time) which made it into the Greek top ten. He also recorded "Opa Opa", which was written by Giorgos Alkaios, and the song charted in several countries. It was later covered by Despina Vandi and Antique in a more pop oriented manner.

He followed this with high-profile tracks such as "Den Se Hreiazome" (I Don't Need You), "Soma Mou" (My Body), "Gyftissa Mera" (Gypsy Day), "Na Hareis" (Cherish) and "Oi Skies" (Shadows).

For his second album Eisai Ena Pistoli (1992), he moved to Minos EMI. While his first three releases were commercially successful, beginning in the mid-1990s, Sfakianakis released a series of multi-platinum albums that are among the best selling albums of all time in Greece including: Notioanatolitika Tou Kosmou (1994) (Southeast of the World), which included "O Aetos" (The Eagle). This acclaimed single was the catalyst that propelled him to domestic superstardom and remains his signature song until today with 120,000–150,000 copies sold." 5o Vima (1996) which has been recognized as the best selling album of all time in Greece with 200 thousand copies sold, I Notes Einai 7psyhes with 132,500 copies (265,000 units) sold, the EPs Pro-Dia-Fimin (1997) with 100,000 copies sold, and Around the World with 15,000, XXX Enthimion (1999), which is the best selling live album of all time in Greece in terms of unit sales with 180,000 copies (360,000 units) sold, In November 2007, Sfakianakis released a new album, Mnimes (Memories). The songs which have become hits are "Ta Klemmena" (The Stolen), a grim reflection on the hardships faced by Greeks in Asia Minor, and "Par' Ta" (Take Them). In late 2009 and early 2010, after more than two years break, Sfakianakis released Kinonikon, the first part in a proposed trilogy of seven song discs called Matomeno Dakry. The most popular songs from Kinonikon are "Den Ypohoro", "Akou file" and "Mpogias". The second part, Erotikon was released in early 2010 and includes several successful songs, in particular "Kleinw tis kourtines", "Esti Ine O Erotas" and "Akouse Me Kala". The third part, Horeutikon, focusing on upbeat dance songs which released in December 2010. The most popular songs are "Ellinas" and "Den Yparxeis".

Polihroma Kai Entona (2000) shipped 100,000 copies and As Milisoun Ta Tragoudia (2002) which fared similarly. His signature song "O Aetos" is one of the most popular songs in Greek music history. Sfakianakis was the best selling artist of the 1990s, and stands as the best selling Greek artist of his generation. However, in the 2000s he faced a significant commercial decline. Me Agapi O,ti Kaneis (2004) and Ana...Genisis (2005) shipped 40,000 copies each. Nihtes... Magikes (2007) and Mnimes (2008) sold 30 thousand copies each, while the EP Kinonia Ora 07:00 sold 15,000 thousand copies.

In November 2007, Sfakianakis released a new album, Mnimes (Memories). The songs which have become hits are "Ta Klemmena" (The Stolen), a grim reflection on the hardships faced by Greeks in Asia Minor, and "Par' Ta" (Take Them). In late 2009 and early 2010, after more than two years break, Sfakianakis released Kinonikon, the first part in a proposed trilogy of seven song discs called Matomeno Dakry. The most popular songs from Kinonikon are "Den Ypohoro", "Akou file" and "Mpogias". The second part, Erotikon was released in early 2010 and includes several successful songs, in particular "Kleinw tis kourtines", "Esti Ine O Erotas" and "Akouse Me Kala". The third part, Horeutikon, focusing on upbeat dance songs which released in December 2010. The most popular songs are "Ellinas" and "Den Yparxeis".

He has sold over 5 million records in Greece alone and in addition to these he has sold over 900,000 copies of his albums as newspaper covermounts.

One of the more popular of his 21st century tracks is "Genethlia" (or "Gennethleia" as it was spelled when it featured on later albums and compilations). This song (the title of which translates as 'Birthday') was originally performed by Cretan lyra player and singer Stelios Mpikakis.

He is one of the most successful singers of his era in Greece.

Sfakianakis is also known for his controversial image and outspoken manner and opinions.

== North American tour (2009) ==
In November 2009, Sfakianakis undertook his first North American tour since 1999 when he was at the peak of his career. On this tour he performed in Atlantic City, NJ, Chicago, IL, and Canada. Many in the Greek community believe that this 10-year period between Sfakianakis' last US visit was due to politically oriented comments he made during a concert during his prior visit that caused some displeasure among Greek-Americans. However, during his 2009 concert in Atlantic City, Sfakianakis expressed his gratitude to the audience for their devotion and affection over the years and wished to give them a concert that "we will all remember after 10 years". Sfakianakis made good on his word, as the crowd gave him numerous ovations during the concert.

== Controversies and opinions ==
Sfakianakis' interviews with the press are always memorable and controversial. He has a reputation for being very outspoken and uses the press to air his opinions on various matters. When he has appeared on live television, he has drawn praise and criticism in equal measure. On the one hand, some have praised his disarming honesty and applauded him for addressing hard-hitting issues. On the other hand, he has been heavily criticised for being argumentative and confrontational; some critics claim he lacks the capacity to be diplomatic.

In the late nineties, Sfakianakis appeared in a television interview during which he argued that cannabis should be legalised in Greece. When asked if he had ever used the drug, Sfakianakis admitted that he had been habitually smoking cannabis for the last ten years. He argued that this substance is not any more harmful than legally distributed substances such as tobacco and alcohol – while pointing out that many fatal road accidents are due to alcohol abuse.

Also in the same period, some publications were talking about tax evasion by him and other artists without providing documentation for their claims.

In an interview with greek music publication Ogdoo, he declared that one of Greece's greatest singers, Stelios Kazantzidis, used to play a role when singing, and that his singing voice was very different than his speaking voice. In the same interview he claimed that he would never sing at the Athens Concert Hall, as it is a place he reviles.

Most of the criticism he has received is a result of his highly supportive statements towards the Greek far right party, Golden Dawn, which he argued are not fascist. He specifically said that "You have to support Golden Dawn. If nothing else, it includes the dawn. The rest have only darkness." and objected to an elected political party's leader being imprisoned.

These statements caused his on-stage collaboration with Despina Vandi to end, a result of Vandi being deeply insulted, coming from an immigrant family.

== Discography ==
Studio albums

- Πρώτη φορά (1991) (First time)
- Eisai Ena Pistoli (1992) (You are a gun) (Gold)
- Με Το Ν Και Με Το S (1993) (With the N to the S) (Platinum)
- Νοτιοανατολικά Του Κόσμου (1994) (Southeast of the world) (2× Platinum)
- 5o Βήμα (1996) (Fifth step) (4× Platinum)
- Οι Νότες Είναι 7ψυχες (1998) (The notes are immortal) (5× Platinum)
- Πολύχρωμα & Έντονα (2000) (Multi-coloured and intense) (2× Platinum)
- As Milisoun Ta Tragoudia (2002) (Let the songs speak) (Platinum)
- Me Agapi O,ti Kaneis (2004) (With love whatever you do) (Platinum)
- Ana Gennisis (2005) (Rebirth) (Platinum)
- Mnimes (2007) (Memories) (Platinum)
- 21+4 Matomena Dakrya (2011) (Bloody teardrops) (4× Platinum)
- 16 Avtotelis Istories (2013) (16 accomplished stories) (5× Platinum)
- Mazi (2014) (Together) (7× Platinum)
- Otan epikoinonoume (2016) (When we communicate) (2× Platinum)
- ...ki o Eros theos einai... (2018) (...Love is a god too...) (3× Platinum)

Live albums

- Εμπειριών Συλλέκτης-Μόνο Για Φίλους (1997) (Collector of experiences) (Platinum)
- XXX Enthimion (1999) (XXX Keepsake) (7× Platinum)
- Nihtes... Magikes (2007) (Magical nights) (Platinum)

Extended plays

- Pro-Dia-Fimin (1997) (By reputation) (4× Platinum)
- Proangelos (1999) (Precursor) (5× Platinum)
- Around the World (1999) (Gold)
- Telos... Dihos Telos (2001) (An end... Without an end) (4× Platinum)
- Anixis (2002) (Springtime) (2× Platinum)
- Kinonia Ora... 07:00 (2006) (Social hour... 07:00) (Platinum)
- Matomeno Dakry: Kinonikon (2009) (Bloody teardrop: of society) (Platinum)
- Matomeno Dakry: Erotikon (2010) (Bloody teardrop: of love) (Platinum)
- Matomeno Dakry: Horeftikon (2010) (Bloody teardrop: of dance) (Platinum)

Compilations

- Ta Zeïbekika Tou Noti Stis 9/8 (2002) (Notis' zeibekika at 9/8)
- 32 Megales Epitihies (2002) (31 big hits)
- Notis: Deka Me Tono (2003) (Notis: ten with an accent) (Gold)
- Evaisthites Notes (2004) (Sensitive notes)
- I Oraioteres Balantes (2005) (The most beautiful ballads)
- 14 Megala Tragoudia (2007) (14 big songs)
- The Collection: The EMI Years (2007)
- Opa Opa...Ta Horeftika (2010) (Opa Opa...the dance songs)
- 25 Hronia (2010) (25 years)
- Ola Ta S' Agapo (2014) (All the I love you)

Video albums;

- 'Hits on DVD: Notis Sfakianakis — 1992–2001 (2004)
- Ta Horeftika Tou Noti (2005) (Notis' dance songs)
