= Ancien =

Ancien may refer to

- the French word for "ancient, old"
  - Société des anciens textes français
- the French for "former, senior"
  - Virelai ancien
  - Ancien Régime
  - Ancien Régime in France
