= Antiquity =

Antiquity or Antiquities may refer to:

== Historical objects or periods ==
=== Artifacts ===
- Antiquities, objects or artifacts surviving from ancient cultures

=== Eras ===
Any period before the European Middle Ages (5th to 15th centuries) but still within the history of Western civilization, including:

- Ancient history, any historical period before the Middle Ages
- Classical antiquity, the classical civilizations of the Mediterranean such as Greece and Rome
- Late antiquity, the period between classical antiquity and the Middle Ages

== Other uses ==
- Antiquity (journal), a journal of archaeological research
- Antiquity, Ohio, a community in the United States
- Antiquity (whisky), a brand of Indian whisky
- John Thomas Smith (engraver) (1766–1833), English painter, engraver and antiquarian nicknamed "Antiquity Smith"
- Antiquities (Magic: The Gathering), an expansion set for the card game Magic: The Gathering
- Antiquity (album), a 1975 album by Jackie McLean and Michael Carvin
- Antiquity, a force of magic in the 1982 animated fantasy film The Flight of Dragons

== See also ==
- Antique (disambiguation)
- Antiquitates (disambiguation)
