= Blue Love (album) =

Studio album by Antique
- Released: 2003
- Recorded: 2001–2003
- Genre: Laïko; Eurodance
- Label: V2; Bonnier; KA
- Producer: Chippe & Wiz; ALX; Alex Papaconstantinou; Takis Damashis; Harry Halkitis; Nicke

Antique chronology
Collector's Edition (2003)	Blue Love (2003)	The Very Best of Antique (2004)

Blue Love is a studio album by Greek singing duo Antique. The songs are mainly the English versions of the songs featured on Alli Mia Fora. The album was released in Scandinavia by Bonnier Music, and in Greece by V2 Records. It peaked on the Greek Foreign Albums Chart at number one. In June 2008, the album was reprinted and reissued by Bonnier Music.

To promote the album, a release party was organised at the restaurant Hamburger Börs in Sweden, which was styled as a Greek taverna for the event on 7 May 2003.

== Track listing ==
No.	Title	Writer(s)	Producer(s)	Length
1.	"Moro Mou (My Baby) [UK Version]" (Μωρό Μου)	Dimtris "funkyfly" Stamatiou, Victoria Halkitis, Michael Anagnostakos	Chippe & Wiz, Alex Papaconstantinou	3:25
2.	"List Of Lovers"	Lilli M., J. Ekman, N. Jarl	Chippe & ALX, Wiz	3:49
3.	"Ela 'Do (Come 2 Me) [UK Version]" (Έλα 'Δω)	Alex Papaconstantinou, Andreas Unge, Papas	Chippe & Wiz, Papaconstantinou	3:24
4.	"Girna Ksana" (Γύρνα Ξανά)	Harry Halkitis, Argiris Koulouris, Andreas Bonatsos	Chippe & Wiz, Papaconstantinou	4:00
5.	"Matia Mou (Where Are You) [Greek/UK Version]" (Μάτια Μου)	Antonis Skokos, Nikos Sarris, Elena Paparizou	Chippe & Wiz	4:22
6.	"Tora Tora" (Τώρα Τώρα)	Harry Halkitis, Argiris Koulouris, Vaggelis Karatzanos	Chippe & Wiz, Papaconstantinou	4:08
7.	"Time To Say Goodbye ('Alli Mia Fora) [UK Version]" ('Άλλη Μια Φορά)	Takis Damashis, Elena Paparizou	Chippe & Takis Damashis	3:53
8.	"Kardia Mou" (Καρδιά Μου)	Toni Mavridis, Elena Paparizou	Chippe & Wiz	4:27
9.	"Den M' Agapas" (Δεν Μ' Αγαπάς)	Chippe Carlsson, Halkitis, Natalia Germanou	Chippe & Harry Halkitis	5:15
10.	"Ti Sou 'Dosa, Ti Mou 'Doses" (Τι Σου 'Δωσα, Τι Μου 'Δωσες)	Damashis, Nikos Vaksavanelis	Chippe, Damashis	3:48
11.	"Pes Mou" (Πες Μου)	Panos Tsapanidis	Chippe & Wizz	4:12
12.	"Welcome To My World"	Carlsson, Andreas Romdhane	Chippe & ALX	3:31

Bonus tracks
No.	Title	Writer(s)	Producer(s)	Length
13.	"Moro Mou (Greek version)" (Μωρό Μου)	Dimtris "funkyfly" Stamatiou, Nikos Sarris	Chippe & Wiz, Papaconstantinou	3:24
14.	"Matia Mou (Greek version)" (Μάτια Μου)	Antonis Skokos, Nikos Sarris	Chippe & Wiz	4:22
15.	"Why? (Greek version)"	Carlsson, Niclas Olausson, Niklas Lundqvist, Antonis Pappas	Chippe & Nicke & Wiz	4:46

== Charts ==
Chart	Peak position
Greek International Albums Chart	1
Finnish Albums Chart	31
Swedish Albums Chart	13
