= Giorgos Alkaios =

Greek recording artist

Giorgos Alkaios Γιώργος Αλκαίος
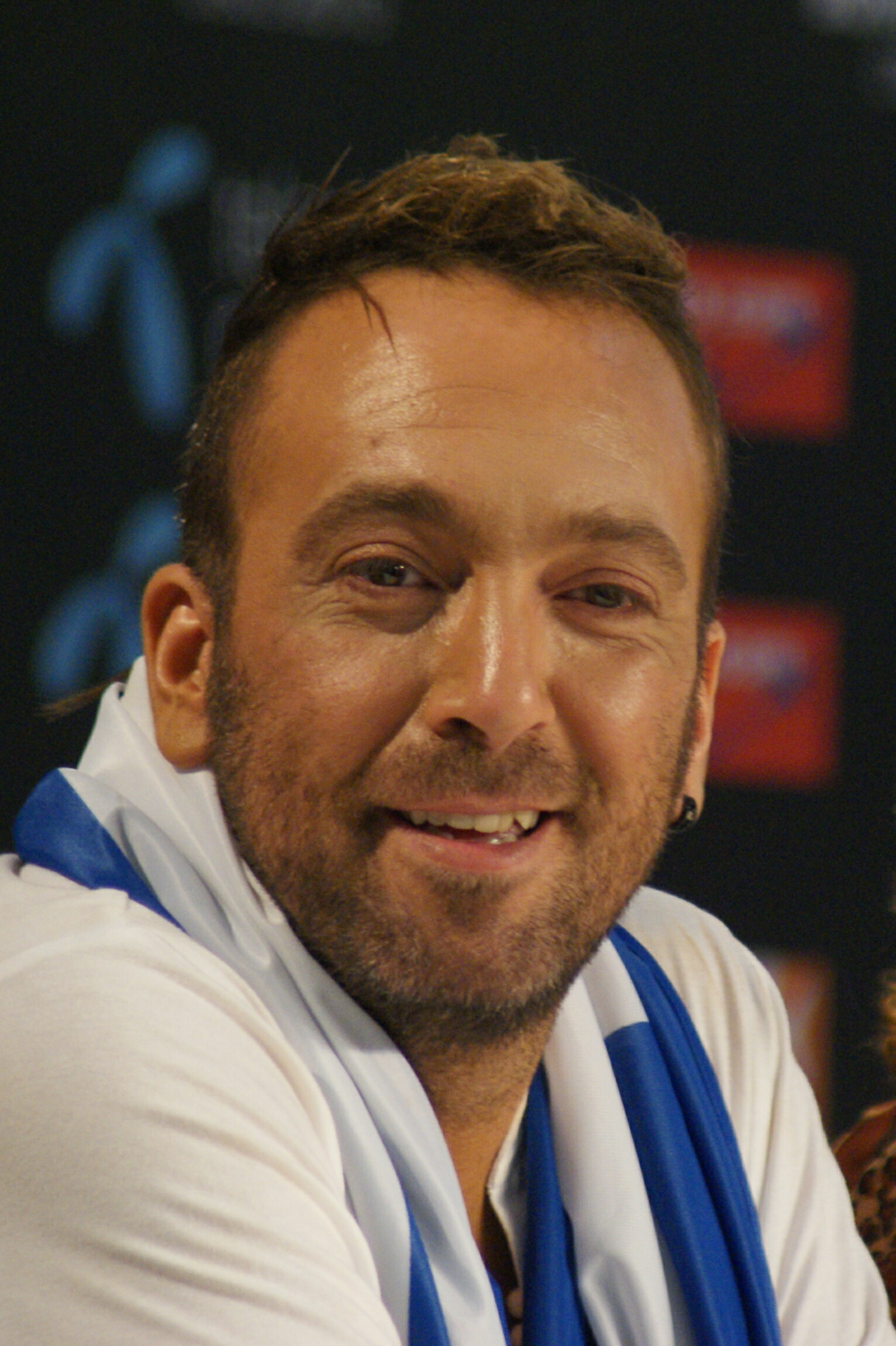
- Alkaios attending an event for the Eurovision Song Contest 2010 in Oslo, Norway.

Background information
- Also known as: Giorgos Alkeos
- Born: Giorgos Vasiliou; 24 December 1971 (age 54); Athens, Greece
- Genres: Pop, modern laïka
- Occupation: Singer
- Years active: 1989–present
- Labels: BMG Greece, Sony Music Greece, Alpha Records, Virus Music, Friends Music Factory, Heaven Music
- Website: http://www.alkaios.gr

Giorgos Alkaios (Greek: Γιώργος Αλκαίος; born 24 December 1971) is a Greek recording artist. His career began in 1989 after appearing on a Greek reality show. Following a brief period of stage acting, Alkaios dedicated himself to music. His first single, "Ti Ti", made him popular in Greece. His distinctive musical style fuses Greek and Oriental elements with modern pop music. To date he has been certified with 5 platinum and 9 gold albums. Alkaios represented Greece in the Eurovision Song Contest 2010 with the song "OPA", and placed 8th in the Final.

== Early life ==
Giorgos Alkaios was born in Athens to Greek and Portuguese parents. He is the son of Giannis Vassiliou, a successful Greek elafro-laiko singer. His mother, Maria (Rodrigues) Griggs – Author of "Mama Sou: Metamorphosis of a Mother" and accomplished IT Programmer Analyst – recently returned to Boston, MA after 8 years living in Pembroke, Maine where she focused on writing her memoir of the abduction of her son by his father. Immediately after his birth, Alkaios moved to Boston, where he lived for three years. Shortly after his parents divorced, he moved back to Greece with his father at age three.

Raised primarily by his grandmother Anna, he lived in Halandri and spent his summers in Salamina with friends and relatives during his childhood. He got his first job at the age of twelve.

From a young age Alkaios showed his love for music and sports. His first experience with music and theatre came at a summer camp in Varimpompi, where he was also a camp counsellor for four years. At the age of sixteen Alkaios dropped out of high school to become an electrician by attending Delta school where he obtained a degree.

== Career ==
=== 1989–1991: Beginnings ===
Alkaios first television appearance came in September 1989 at the age of seventeen on one of the first reality shows in Greece, "Ela Sto Fos" (Come to the light), on ET 2. The show featured 1,500 new actors, singers, and dancers, which were later narrowed down to twenty, with Alkaios being one of them. While on the show, he studied dance with Daniel Lomel, acting with Niki Triantafilidou, and music with Giorgos Hatzinasios, among others.

During the summer of that same year, he auditioned for and won a part in Minos Volonaki's play "Sofoklis 'Antigone'", which starred legendary Aliki Vougiouklaki and with music by Mikis Theodorakis. Rehearsals lasted over two months and the show premiered at the ancient theater Epidavros. At the time, Alkaios became the youngest actor to be cast in a historic play and also perform in a historical theater.

During the same summer, Alkaios decided to change his focus from theatre to music. He was then introduced by fellow singer Christos Dantis to BMG A&R Director Vangelis Yannopoulos, while recording his debut album for BMG, "Aman". Vangelis Yannopoulos auditioned Alkaios (who, at that moment still bore his real surname which is Vassileiou) and decided to sign him with the record company. Together, they found Alkaios' future "sound" and "style". In the summer of 1991 Alkaios went on tour all over Greece along with his fellow Christos Dantis. In September of that same year, Alkaios participated in the Thessaloniki Song Contest with the song "Den Me Theleis Tolmiro", where he officially started to go by the name "Giorgos Alkaios" as opposed to his birth name which he had used up until that point. Alkaios beat out then newcomer Sakis Rouvas, and won the award for "Best Vocals" by one point.

Before the release of his debut album, Alkaios also began writing music for other singers including Alexia (for the album "Matia mou", BMG, also a Vangelis Yannopoulos' production) and Notis Sfakianakis. One of the songs he wrote during that time was "Opa Opa" for Sfakianakis' album of the same name. This was Sfakianakis' first release with Minos EMI after his departure from Sony Music Entertainment Greece. The song was also covered by Helena Paparizou's band Antique) and Despina Vandi.

=== 1992–1998: Debut and success ===
In 1992, Alkaios released his debut album titled Me Ligo...Trak. Music on the album was written by Alkaios, while lyrics were exclusively written by Evi Droutsa who finished the record production that Vangelis Yannopoulos had initiated. The single "Ti Ti" (a cover of Khaled's Arabic smash hit "Didi"), and which mean "What ? What ?" became a massive hit in Greece, and was one of the first Greek songs to mix oriental sounds with Western pop, following thus the paths that Christos Dantis' "Aman" had traced before, thus confirming Greek new music standards at the time.

During the next nine years, Alkaios collaborated with Gavrilis Pantzis, new BMG A&R Director after the departure of Vangelis Yannopoulos to Minos Emi, leading to many gold and platinum albums. For the next five years, he wore a black scarf on his right hand that became his trademark, while he also became one of the first few Greek male artist that openly embraced fashion.

In 1993, he released his second album titled Ax! Koita Me (Oh! Look at me), followed by Den Peirazei (It doesn't matter). In 1995 he released "Anef Logou" which went Gold. This was followed by Entos Eaftou and later En Psihro which both went platinum.

=== 1998–present: Further success ===
In 1998, Alkaios signed with Sony Music Greece, and create with producer Gavrilis Pantzis, the "DNA" label, distributed by Sony Music. Elli Kokkinou's first ever single and album was released by DNA label and produced by Gavrilis Pantzis, with a little help from Alkaios. Shortly after he released the album Ixoi Siopis which featured a completely new look for Alkaios, while the album art work shocked many. The album went gold in less than 24 hours and later Platinum. Sirmatoplegma followed in 1999, which also went gold in less than 24 hours and later platinum. Turkish football team Galatasaray selected the single "Sirmatoplegma" as an anthem.

In 2000, he released Pro Ton Pilon followed by Oxigono on 2001 which both went gold. A CD Single titled "Karma" was released in 2002.

In 2002, he wrote the hit single "Pame Ela" for Pamela.

In 2003, Alkaios signed with Alpha Records, and shortly after released the album Kommatia Psihis. For the winter season of 2003–2004 Alkaios performed with Antzi Samiou at club Gefira.

In 2005, Alkaios released the live album titled "Live Tour". The album, which featured three CDs, featured songs recorded throughout the previous twelve years at various concerts in Greece, the United States, Canada, Australia, Germany, the United Kingdom, Albania, and Cyprus.

In 2006, Alkaios signed with Virus Music, collaborating again with Miltos Karatzas who took care of him while he was managing director of BMG Greece. Shortly after in November 2008, Alkaios founded his own record label with Kaiti Garbi's husband, Dionysis Schinas Friends Music Factory.

In 2010, Giorgos Alkaios and Friends were announced amongst nine other entries to take part in a Greek National Final organized by national broadcaster ERT to represent Greece in the Eurovision Song Contest 2010. On 12 March 2010 Alkaios and Friends were selected by the Greek public along with a jury, to represent Greece in the Eurovision Song Contest 2010 with the song "OPA". On 25 May 2010, Alkaios performed 13th in the first semi-final finishing 2nd with 133 points, thus granting him a spot in the Final. On 29 May 2010, Alkaios performed 11th in the final, and finished in 8th place with 140 points.

Since then, Alkaios seems to be retired on the Greek island of Milos, while in December 2011 – January 2012, record sessions took part for a "reloaded" of all his hits under the working title "Deja vu". Some tracks have already emerged on YouTube. And a forthcoming tour is under discussions.

== Discography ==
=== Studio albums ===
- 1992: Me ligo...trak (Με λίγο...Τρακ)
- 1993: Ah! Koita me (Αχ! Κοίτα με)
- 1994: Den peirazei (Δεν πειράζει)
- 1995: Anef logou (Άνευ λόγου) (Gold)
- 1996: Entos eaftou (Εντός εαυτού) (Platinum)
- 1997: En psichro (Εν ψυχρώ) (Platinum)
- 1998: Ichi siopis (Ήχοι σιωπής) (Platinum)
- 1999: Sirmatoplegma (Sυρματόπλεγμα) (Gold)
- 2000: Pro ton pilon (Προ των πυλών)
- 2001: Oxygono (Οξυγόνο)
- 2003: Kommatia psichis (Κομμάτια ψυχής)
- 2004: Aithousa anamonis (Special Edition) (Αίθουσα αναμονής)
- 2006: Nichtes apo fos (Νύχτες από φώς)
- 2007: Eleftheros (Ελεύθερος)
- 2008: To diko mas paramithi (Το δικό μας παραμύθι)

=== Compilations ===
- 1999: Ta dika mou tragoudia-The Best Of '92-'99 (Τα δικά μου τραγούδια)
- 2002: Ta Tragoudia Mou (Τα τραγούδια μου)

=== Live albums ===
- 2005: Live Tour

=== EPs and CD singles ===
- 1999: The Remixes E.P.
- 2002: Karma (Κάρμα)
- 2010: Dos mou ligo fos (Δως μου λίγο φως)

=== Production discography ===
Giorgos Alkaios has also penned for several other artists. The internationally charted song "Opa Opa", which has been covered by many singers, has been released as a single by Notis Sfakianakis, Antique, and Despina Vandi. The Antique version charted in the top 10 of some European charts. Despina Vandi's version reached No 3 in the US Billboard Hot Dance Radio Airplay.

== Friends Music Factory ==
Friends Music Factory was an independent record label established by Giorgos Alkaios and fellow musician and friend Dionysis Schinas in November 2008. Apart from traditional points of sale, releases by the label are also distributed to news kiosks around Greece and Cyprus, often bundled with special edition publications at a discounted fixed price.

Other artists and employees from the label helped pen the lyrics to Alkaios' Eurovision song "OPA", some of whom performed with him on stage at the Eurovision Song Contest 2010.

Preceded by Sakis Rouvas with "This Is Our Night"	Greece in the Eurovision Song Contest; 2010	Succeeded by Loukas Giorkas feat. Stereo Mike with "Watch My Dance"
