= Dinata =

1991 song

Song by Eleftheria Arvanitaki

from the album Meno Ektos
- Language: Greek
- Released: 1991
- Genre: Laika
- Label: PolyGram/Polydor
- Songwriters: Ara Dinkjian; Lina Nikolakopoulou

"Dinata" or "Dynata" is a song from the album Meno Ektos; its music was composed by Ara Dinkjian, its lyrics written by Lina Nikolakopoulou and it was first sung by Eleftheria Arvanitaki while Arto Tuncboyaciyan features in non verbal singing and percussion in some versions and performances of it; it mixes the influence of Balkan, Greek and Armenian music with electronics.

The song's success was cemented in 1995 through its live performance on the CD single Zontana stous Vrachous – Kalokairi '95 (Live at the Rocks – Summer '95). This particular release was the first CD single ever issued in Greece, achieving platinum commercial success. The arrangement by Adonis Mitzelos, featuring Arto Tancboyaciyan on percussion, transformed the style of the track. Mitzelos redefined its structure, evolving it from a straightforward studio recording into a rhythmic, ethnic-fusion piece built upon electric and acoustic guitar riffs. This arrangement found success throughout Europe, paving the way for both Eleftheria Arvanitaki and Adonis Mitzelos to participate in European world music, ethnic, and jazz festivals (such as WOMAD).

This song, among the others on Meno Ektos, improved Arvanitaki's name recognition in Greece; a notable performance of it by her was at the closing ceremony of the 2004 Athens Olympics, during the fireworks and after the flame had been extinguished.

== Alternative versions ==
"Homecoming"

Song by Night Ark

from the album Picture
- Released: 1986
- Songwriter: Ara Dinkjian

Various versions of "Dinata" exist. The song or rather the music was first published in 1986 as an instrumental piece by Night Ark (see below), whence its "official" English title, i.e. Homecoming.

=== Night Ark ===
Ara Dinkjian is a founding member of the band or instrumental jazz quartet Night Ark; their most famous piece is Homecoming which can be first found on their 1986 album Picture.

=== French ===
A French version of the song was recorded by Demis Roussos on the 1997 album Mon Ile with French lyrics by Koraz.

==== Track listing ====
- French single
1. "Dinata" (Radio Edit) - 3:37
2. "Dinata" - 4:12
3. "Mon Ile" - 4:16

=== Antique ===
"Dinata Dinata"

Single by Antique

from the album Mera Me Ti Mera
- Released: 11 November 1999 (Greece)
- Genre: Laïko; Eurodance
- Length: 3:17
- Label: Bonnier Music; Virgin Schallplatten
- Songwriters: A. Dinkjian; L. Nikolakopoulou
- Producers: C&N Project; Adebratt

"Dinata Dinata" was covered by Greek-Swedish duo Antique. It was released in November 1999 as the second single from their debut album, Mera Me Ti Mera. It reached the top 10 in Romania, Italy and Sweden. In Italy, this song was released on 5 December 1999.

==== Track listing ====
- German and Swedish single
1. "Dinata Dinata" (Radio Edit) - 3:17
2. "Dinata Dinata" (Extended Version) - 4:25
3. "Westoriental Trip" - 4:07
- Swedish single
1. "Dinata Dinata" (Radio Edit) - 3:17
2. "Set Your Body Free" - 5:28
- Swedish promo single
1. "Dinata Dinata" (C&N Project Mix) - 7:45
2. "Dinata Dinata" (Jonas S. Club Mix) - 5:06
3. "Dinata Dinata" (L.O.L. Brothers on a Mission Mix) - 5:14
4. "Dinata Dinata" (Radio Edit) - 3:18

==== Charts ====
| Chart (1999) | Peak position |
|---|---|
| Norway (VG-lista) | 19 |
| Romania (Romanian Top 100) | 8 |
| Sweden (Sverigetopplistan) | 8 |
| Italy (FIMI) | 6 |

=== Turkish ===
A Turkish version of the song was released by Sezen Aksu with the title Sarışın on the 1988 album Sezen Aksu'88.

=== Russian ===
A Russian version of the song, "Ogon' i voda" ("Fire and Water"), was recorded by Philipp Kirkorov for his album CheloFiliya, released in 2000.
