= (I Would) Die for You =

2001 song by Antique

Single by Antique

from the album Die for You
- Released: March 6, 2001
- Recorded: 2001
- Genre: Laïko; syrtaki; Europop
- Label: V2; Bonnier; EMI International
- Composer: Nikos Terzis
- Lyricist: Antonis Pappas
- Producers: C&N Project

Antique singles chronology
| "Mera Me Ti Mera" (2000) | "(I Would) Die for You" (2001) | "Ligo Ligo" (2001) |

Eurovision Song Contest 2001 entry
- Country: Greece
- Artists: Helena Paparizou; Nikos Panagiotidis
- As: Antique
- Languages: English, Greek
- Composer: Nikos Terzis
- Lyricist: Antonis Pappas

Finals performance
- Final result: 3rd
- Final points: 147

Entry chronology
- ◄ "Mia Krifi Evesthisia" (1998)
- "S.A.G.A.P.O." (2002) ►

Official performance video
- "(I Would) Die for You" on YouTube

"(I Would) Die for You" is a song recorded by Greek-Swedish duo Antique. It represented Greece in the Eurovision Song Contest 2001 held in Copenhagen, placing third.

== Background ==
=== Conception ===
The song, with lyrics by Antonis Pappas and music by Nikos Terzis, –who would later compose "Love Me Tonight" for Belarus–, is an up-tempo number inspired in part by Greek folk music. Lyrically, it deals with the realization on the part of the singers, who sing in unison for most of the performance, that their love is all that matters. They tell each other that "I would die for you/Look into my eyes and see it's true".

It was recorded by the duo Antique, composed by Helena Paparizou and Nikos Panagiotidis, both born and raised in Sweden by Greek parents. The duo had had two Top 10 hits in both Greece and Sweden, "Opa Opa" and "Dinata Dinata".

=== Eurovision ===
6 March 2001, "Die for You" performed by Antique competed in the 11th edition of Ellinikós Telikós, the national selection organised by the Hellenic Broadcasting Corporation (ERT) to select its song and performer for the 46th edition of the Eurovision Song Contest. The song won the competition so it became the Greek entry, and Antique the performers, for Eurovision.

On 12 May 2001, the Eurovision Song Contest was held at the Parken Stadium in Copenhagen hosted by the Danish Broadcasting Corporation (DR), and broadcast live throughout the continent. Antique performed "(I Would) Die for You" twenty-second on the evening, following Malta's "Another Summer Night" by Fabrizio Faniello and preceding Denmark's "Never Ever Let You Go" by Rollo & King. They performed the song in English and Greek, becoming the first entry from Greece not to be performed entirely in Greek. The performance was a relatively static affair, with both singers as well as the backing vocalists standing in front of microphones to sing. Paparizou, however, wore a tight white outfit, standing out against the black-clad backing singers and her duet partner. While the contest had by this point embraced pre-recorded music, Nikos Panagiotidis performed with the traditional Greek instrument bouzouki throughout.

At the close of voting, it had received 147 points (12 points from Spain and Sweden), placing third in a field of twenty-three. This third-place was Greece's highest place until 2005, when Paparizou, this time performing solo, won the contest with "My Number One". It was succeeded as Greek representative at the 2002 contest by "S.A.G.A.P.O." by Michalis Rakintzis.

=== Aftermath ===
"(I Would) Die for You" was released as a CD single by Bonnier Music and EMI International following the contest. The CD single was certified platinum in Greece and gold in Sweden. The song was included on Antique's second album, Die for You, released as Die for You/Tha Pethaina Gia Sena in the Greek market.

The song was covered by Russian pop singer Filipp Kirkorov as "Я за тебя умру".

The song was covered by Lithuanian pop singer Mino as "Be Meilės Mirt Galiu".

== Track listing ==
- Greek release
1. "(I Would) Die For You" (English Version) (3:00)
2. "(I Would) Die For You" (Eurovision Version) (3:00)
3. "(I Would) Die For You" (Greek Version) (3:00)
4. "(I Would) Die For You" (Extended Version)
- Promo single
1. "(I Would) Die For You" (Eric S Radio)
2. "(I Would) Die For You" (Die For Disco Radio)
3. "(I Would) Die For You" (Nordlight Vs C&N Project)
4. "(I Would) Die For You" (BGTH Remix Radio)
5. "(I Would) Die For You" (Eric S Club)
6. "(I Would) Die For You" (BGTH Remix Extended)
7. "(I Would) Die For You" (Die For Disco Instrumental)
8. "(I Would) Die For You" (Eurovision Version)
9. "(I Would) Die For You" (Extended Version)

== Charts ==
=== Weekly charts ===
| Chart (2001) | Peak position |
|---|---|
| Denmark (Tracklisten) | 15 |
| Europe (Eurochart Hot 100) | 84 |
| Germany (GfK) | 85 |
| Greece (IFPI) | 1 |
| Norway (VG-lista) | 9 |
| Romania (Romanian Top 100) | 4 |
| Sweden (Sverigetopplistan) | 3 |
| Switzerland (Schweizer Hitparade) | 75 |

=== Year-end charts ===
| Chart (2001) | Position |
|---|---|
| Sweden (Sverigetopplistan) | 13 |

== Release history ==
| Country | Date | Format(s) | Label | Ref. |
|---|---|---|---|---|
| Austria | 14 May 2001 | CD single | Virgin | |
| Germany | 14 May 2001 | CD single | Virgin | |
| Switzerland | 14 May 2001 | CD single | Virgin | |
| Scandinavia | 14 May 2001 | CD single | Bonnier | |
| Poland | 14 May 2001 | CD single | Magic | |
