= Moro Mou =

Single by Antique

from the album Alli Mia Fora
- Released: March 2003
- Genre: Eurodance, Laïko
- Label: Bonnier, V2
- Songwriters: Victoria Chalkitis, Michail Anagnostakos, Nikos Sarris, Dimitris "Funkyfly" Stamatiou
- Producers: Chippe & Wiz, Alex Papaconstantinou

Antique singles chronology
| "Follow Me" (2002) | "Moro Mou" (2003) | "Time to Say Goodbye" (2003) |

"Moro Mou" (My Baby) is a song released by Greek-Swedish duo Antique. It was released in March 2003 in Sweden as the first single from their album Alli Mia Fora. It was released on March 16, 2002, by V2 Records in Greece.

== Track listing ==
1. "Moro Mou" (UK Radio Version) - 3:25
2. "Moro Mou" (Greek Version) - 3:24

== Charts ==
"Moro Mou" entered the Swedish Top 60 Singles Chart on the week of March 20, 2003 at number fourteen. It stayed on the chart for twenty weeks straight peaking at number three in its ninth week.

| Chart (2003) | Peak position |
|---|---|
| Romania (Romanian Top 100) | 9 |
| Sweden (Sverigetopplistan) | 3 |
