= Antique (band) =

Greek musical duo

- Origin: Gothenburg, Sweden
- Genres: Laïko, Eurodance
- Years active: 1999–2003, 2022–present
- Labels: V2, Bonnier, Virgin Schallplatten, KA, Urban, Popular, Minos EMI
- Members: Helena Paparizou; Nikos Panagiotidis

Antique is a Swedish-Greek musical duo consisting of Helena Paparizou (Έλενα Παπαρίζου; born 1982) and Nikos Panagiotidis (Νίκος Παναγιωτίδης; born 1978). Formed in Gothenburg in 1999, the duo combines Greek popular music and lyrics with a Nordic dance-pop sound.

Both Paparizou and Panagiotidis were born and raised in Sweden by Greek parents. They were the first ever to be nominated for a Swedish Grammis in the category modern dance with a Greek song. In 2001, Antique were selected to represent Greece at the Eurovision Song Contest in Copenhagen with the song "Die for You", sung in a blend of English and Greek, ending with a third place – only behind Estonia and hosts Denmark. The group is famous in Scandinavia, Greece, Cyprus, Germany and Italy. After 19 years of hiatus the group reunited in March 2022 in Greece releasing a cover hit song from 90's meant to be their comeback in music industry.

== Career ==
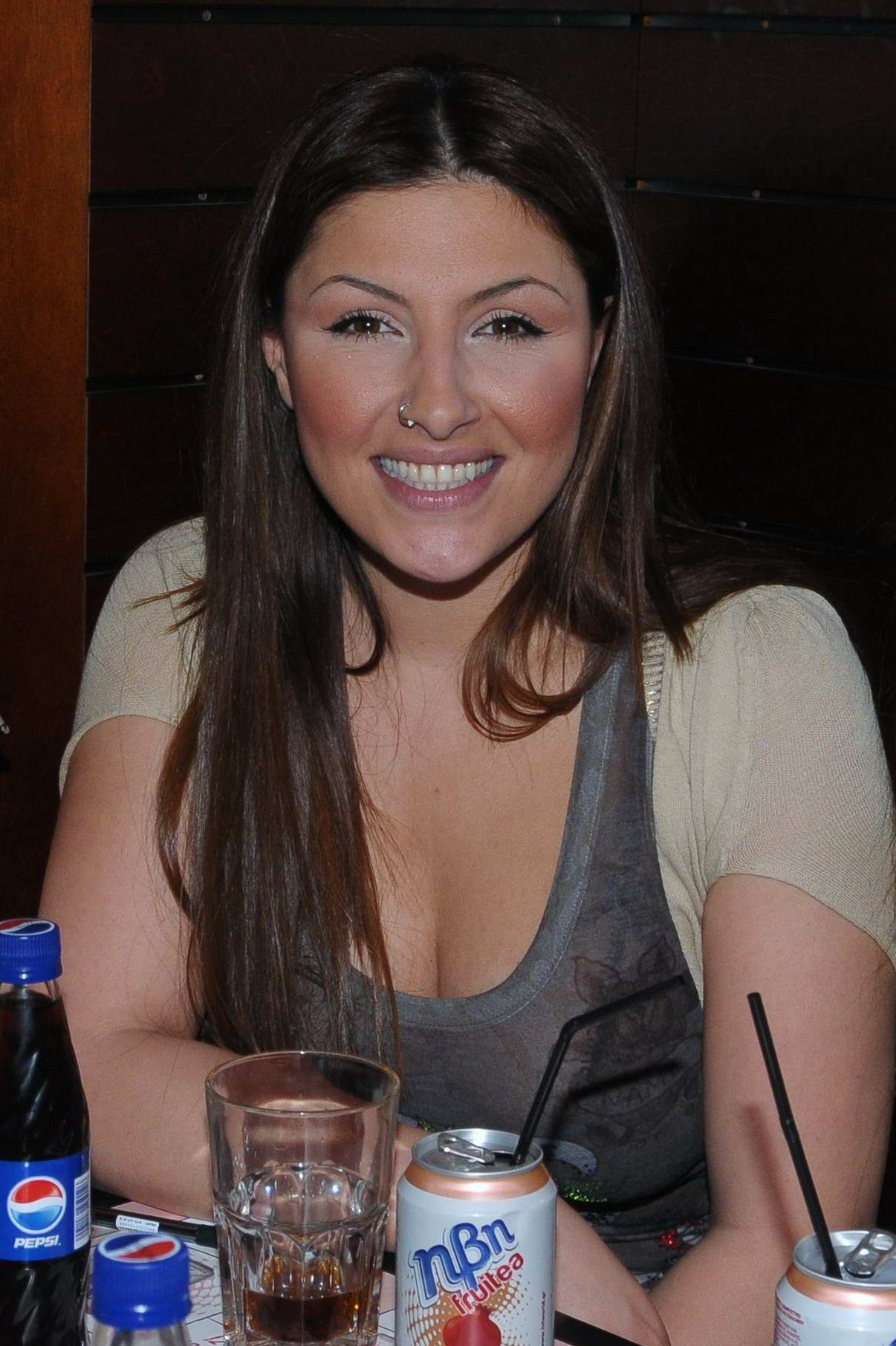
Helena Paparizou (2010)

In 1999, some DJ friends of Helena Paparizou's brother asked her to make a demo of the Notis Sfakianakis hit "Opa Opa". Paparizou told them that the lyrics are for a man, so she asked to sing it with her childhood friend Nikos Panagiotidis, whom she had met through her siblings at a Greek diaspora celebration in Stockholm. At that time, some record producers were undergoing a project to sign a duo consisting of a male and a female that would sing covers of traditional Greek hits oriented towards the Greek diaspora of Sweden, finally coming in contact with Paparizou, who recommended Panagiotidis; they formed Antique and were signed to newly formed indie label Bonnier Music, settling on the name because it left an impression of being "classic" and "timeless". Paparizou admitted that Greek music had been something of an acquired taste for her, and that the name "Antique" was probably a reflection of her childhood impression of it being something rather distant and old-fashioned; something that she only really associated with her summer holidays in Greece. Their debut single "Opa Opa" became a hit amongst the Greeks in Sweden and eventually entered the top ten in Sweden and Norway, making them the first act to enter into the Swedish top five with a song sung in Greek. Their later singles "Dinata Dinata", "Follow Me", and "Moro Mou" also charted well.

=== Eurovision Song Contest 2001 ===
Despite being relatively unknown in Greece, the duo entered the national final to become Greece's representatives in the Eurovision Song Contest 2001 in Copenhagen, Denmark with the song "(I Would) Die for You", written by Nikos Terzis with lyrics by Antonis Pappas, placing joint first, but being named the winners by default as they had won the public vote. The song placed third in the actual contest with 147 points; although equaled by the 2004 entry, it was the best placing Greece had ever received until Paparizou won the contest as a solo artist in 2005. The song went on to become their biggest hit in Greece, reaching Platinum status, while it peaked at number three in Sweden and Greece, and charted elsewhere. Antique's success in the contest led to them earning recognition in Greece and working there for the rest of their career.

In continuation, they recorded four studio albums that achieved mild success, performed a small European tour, and collaborated with artists such as Katy Garbi and Slavi Trifonov. In 2002, they recorded the song "V-Power" in both English and Greek versions. The songs were included on the 14-track promotional album released for Royal Dutch Shell by V2 Records to promote the premium unleaded gasoline product known as V-Power. Antique disbanded in late 2003 on good terms with both members pursuing solo careers. Elena Paparizou won the Eurovision Song Contest 2005 representing Greece with "My Number One". There are currently no intentions of reuniting the group, although they have both expressed to want to reunite in the future.

=== 2019–2022: New material ===
Antique reunited 16 years after the group's hiatus for a special anniversary concert on July 13, 2019, in Sweden, performing live their greatest hits for Swedish audience. In Cyprus at Super Music Awards, Panagiotidis awarded Paparizou for Best Female Adult artist.

In March 2022 Antique covered a song from the 1990s titled Ti Ti by Giorgos Alkaios, to be released in April 2022.

On July 2, 9, 23 Antique performed at Vi som älskar 90-talet (Us who love the 90s) 2022 concert festival in Sweden performing some of their hit singles.

On November 17, Antique attended Het Grote Songfestivalfeest singing Die For You which took place in Ziggo Dome arena in Amsterdam, while it will be broadcast at a later time by the public broadcaster of the Netherlands.

=== 2023–present: Highlights ===
In April 2025, due to 26th anniversary Spotify updated the group's discography with all albums and EPs available on the platform and digital covers in HQ.

== Discography ==
- Mera Me Ti Mera (1999)
- Die for You (2001)
- Me Logia Ellinika (2002)
- Alli Mia Fora (2003)
- Blue Love (2003)

== Tours ==
- European Tour
- North American Tour
- Rex 2001-02
- Apollonas 2002
- We Who Love 90's Festival (Sweden) 2019
- We Who Love 90's Festival (Sweden) 2022

== Awards ==
Grammis

- Best Modern Dance Song ("Opa Opa", 2000, nominated)

Eurovision Song Contest

- 3rd place, 147 points (2001)

Pop Corn Music Awards

- Best Group (2001, won)
- Best Dance Song (2001, "(I Would) Die for You", nominated)

Planeta TV Music Awards

- Best Pop video (2003, "Why?", win)

MAD Video Music Awards

- Best Dressed Artist in a Video (Elena Paparizou in "Alli Mia Fora", 2004, nominated)

Preceded by Thalassa with "Mia Krifi Evesthisia"	Greece in the Eurovision Song Contest; 2001	Succeeded by Michalis Rakintzis with "S.A.G.A.P.O."
