= Nikos Oikonomopoulos discography =

- Studio albums: 10
- Singles: 35

This article contains the discography of the Greek singer Nikos Oikonomopoulos.

It consists of ten studio albums including Gia Hilious Logous, Ennoeitai and Tha Eimai Edo which became quadruple platinum, and thirty-five singles including "Gia Kapoio Logo" which is one of the most viewed Greek songs on YouTube.

== Discography ==
=== Studio albums ===
Title	Album details	Peak chart positions	Certification
Title	Album details	GRE	Certification
Proti Agapi	Released: 15 November 2007 (Greece); Format: CD, CD/DVD, digital download; Label: Sony BMG Greece	—	
Akousa…	Released: 18 December 2008 (Greece); Format: CD, digital download; Label: Sony BMG Greece	—N/a	Gold
Katathesi Psihis	Released: 11 December 2009 (Greece); Format: CD, digital download; Label: Sony BMG Greece	—N/a	Platinum
Doro Gia Sena	Released: 3 December 2010 (Greece); Format: CD, digital download; Label: Minos EMI	1	3× Platinum
Tha Eimai Edo	Released: 12 December 2011 (Greece); Format: CD, digital download; Label: Minos EMI	1	4× Platinum
Ennoeitai	Released: 14 December 2012 (Greece); Format: CD, digital download; Label: Minos EMI	1	4× Platinum
Eilikrina	Released: 6 December 2013 (Greece); Format: CD, digital download; Label: Minos EMI	1	2× Platinum
Gia Hilious Logous	Released: 17 November 2014 (Greece); Format: CD, digital download; Label: Minos EMI	1	4× Platinum
Ena Mikrofono Ki Ego	Released: 17 December 2015 (Greece); Format: CD, digital download; Label: Minos EMI	1	2× Platinum
10	Released: 8 December 2017 (Greece); Format: CD, digital download; Label: Minos EMI	1	2× Platinum

=== Compilation albums ===
Title	Details
Best Of Nikos Oikonomopoulos	Released: 2 February 2013; Format: CD, digital download,
Oi Megaliteres Epitihies	Released: 11 April 2015; Label: Feelgood Records, Sony Music; Format: CD, digital download, promo

=== Singles ===
"—" denotes a single that has not charted or was not released in that region.

Year	Title	Peak chart positions	Album
Year	Title	GRE	Album
2007	"Matia Mou"	2	Proti Agapi
2012	"Ennoeitai"	1	Ennoeitai
2013	"Se Lipame"	5	Eilikrina
2013	"Mi Figeis Tora"	3	Eilikrina
2014	"Exaitias Sou"	1	Eilikrina
2014	"Gia Hilious Logous"	5	Gia Hilious Logous
2015	"An Ponas"	2	Ena Mikrofono Ki Ego
2015	"Akou Na Deis"	4	Ena Mikrofono Ki Ego
2015	"Pion Koroidevo"	8	Ena Mikrofono Ki Ego
2016	"Einai Kati Laika"	1	10
2017	"O Haraktiras"	1	10
2017	"Gia Kapoio Logo"	1	10
2018	"Parakala Na Pethano"	10	10
2018	"Gia Paradeigma"	5	10
2018	"De S'Agapao"	2	Non-album single
2018	"Tora Ti Na To Kano"	1	Non-album single
2019	"Dio Zoes"	1	Non-album single
2019	"Val' To Terma"	1	Non-album single
2019	"Kathimerina"	1	Non-album single
2020	"Skase Ena Fili"	3	Non-album single
2020	"Emena Na Akous"	1	Non-album single
2021	"Proti Thesi"	2	Non-album single
2021	"Apo Erota"	1	Non-album single
2022	"Pali Girisa"	3	Non-album single
2022	"Oso Tipota Se Thelo"	1	Non-album single
2022	"Prepei Den Prepei"	1	Non-album single
