= List of number-one albums of 2016 (Greece) =

The Top-75 Albums Sales Chart, also known as Top 75 Combined Repertoire chart, is the official weekly albums chart of Greece, which ranks the best-selling albums in the country. The chart, which is compiled by IFPI Greece, the Greek branch of the International Federation of the Phonographic Industry, debuted in October 2010, replacing and combining the prior separate Greek-language and foreign album charts.

== 2016 ==
Week	Album	Artist	Reference
Week 1	Suite no.2016 by Alexandros Christopoulos	Various Artists	
Week 2	Suite no.2016 by Alexandros Christopoulos	Various Artists	
Week 3	Suite no.2016 by Alexandros Christopoulos	Various Artists	
Week 4	25	Adele	
Week 5	25	Adele	
Week 6	Ena Mikrofono Ki Ego	Nikos Oikonomopoulos	
Week 7	Ena Mikrofono Ki Ego	Nikos Oikonomopoulos	
Week 8	Ena Mikrofono Ki Ego	Nikos Oikonomopoulos	
Week 9	Ena Mikrofono Ki Ego	Nikos Oikonomopoulos	
Week 10	Oyranio Toxo Pou Tou Lypane Dyo Xromata	Pantelis Pantelidis	
Week 11	Gia Mia Thesi Mes'ti Kardia Sou	Boys + Noise	
Week 12	Gia Mia Thesi Mes'ti Kardia Sou	Boys + Noise	
Week 13	Thema Hronou	Yannis Ploutarchos	
Week 14	Thema Hronou	Yannis Ploutarchos	
Week 15	Thema Hronou	Yannis Ploutarchos	
Week 16	Thema Hronou	Yannis Ploutarchos	
Week 17	Unknown	Unknown	—
Week 18	Oti Ki An Peis Sou Leo Nai	Paschalis Terzis	
Week 19	Oti Ki An Peis Sou Leo Nai	Paschalis Terzis	
Week 20	Oti Ki An Peis Sou Leo Nai	Paschalis Terzis	
Week 21	Oti Ki An Peis Sou Leo Nai	Paschalis Terzis	
Week 22	Thema Hronou	Yannis Ploutarchos	
Week 23	Thema Hronou	Yannis Ploutarchos	
Week 24	Osa Niotho	Konstantinos Argyros	
Week 25	Oti Ki An Peis Sou Leo Nai	Paschalis Terzis	
Week 26	Non Stop Mix Vol. 12 By Nikos Halkousis	Various Artists	
Week 27	Non Stop Mix Vol. 12 By Nikos Halkousis	Various Artists	
Week 28	Non Stop Mix Vol. 12 By Nikos Halkousis	Various Artists	
Week 29	Non Stop Mix Vol. 12 By Nikos Halkousis	Various Artists	
Week 30	Ta Kalitera	Paola	
Week 31	Unknown	Unknown	—
Week 32	Unknown	Unknown	—
Week 33	Unknown	Unknown	—
Week 34	Unknown	Unknown	—
Week 35	Unknown	Unknown	—
Week 36	Minos Summer 2016	Various Artists	
Week 37	Minos Summer 2016	Various Artists	
Week 38	Thema Hronou	Yannis Ploutarchos	
Week 39	Thema Hronou	Yannis Ploutarchos	
Week 40	Thema Hronou	Yannis Ploutarchos	
Week 41	Afti Ine I Diafora Mas	Despina Vandi	
Week 42	Afti Ine I Diafora Mas	Despina Vandi	
Week 43	Afti Ine I Diafora Mas	Despina Vandi	
Week 44	As' Ta Ola Ki Ela	Natassa Theodoridou	
Week 45	As' Ta Ola Ki Ela	Natassa Theodoridou	
Week 46	As' Ta Ola Ki Ela	Natassa Theodoridou	
Week 47	Hardwired... to Self-Destruct	Metallica	
Week 48	Hardwired... to Self-Destruct	Metallica	
Week 49	Hardwired... to Self-Destruct	Metallica	
Week 50	Unknown	Unknown	—
Week 51	Gia Panta	Pantelis Pantelidis	
Week 52	Gia Panta	Pantelis Pantelidis	
