= Ennoeitai =

Ennoeitai Εννοείται

Studio album by Nikos Oikonomopoulos
- Released: 14 December 2012
- Genre: Modern laika
- Length: 46:07
- Label: Minos EMI
- Producer: Thanasis Papageorgiou

Nikos Oikonomopoulos chronology
Tha Eimai Edo (2011)	Ennoeitai; Εννοείται (2012)	Eilikrina (2013)

Singles from Ennoeitai
- 1. "Ennoeitai" Released: 5 October 2012; 2. "Ora Na Pigaino" Released: 22 November 2012; 3. "Isihia" Released: 16 May 2013

Ennoeitai (Greek: Εννοείται; English: It's Understood) is the sixth studio album by Greek singer Nikos Oikonomopoulos. It was released on 14 December 2012 by Minos EMI. The songs "Ennoeitai" and "Ora Na Pigaino" were the most populars, with music composed by Panos Kapiris and written lyrics by Eleni Giannatsoulia.

== Track listing ==
1. "Ennoeitai" (Εννοείται; It’s Understood) – 3:08
2. "Poso Na Poneso" (Πόσο Να Πονέσω; How Much Should I Suffer) – 3:00
3. "Afto To Soma" (Αυτό Το Σώμα; This Body) – 3:55
4. "Melanholia Mou" (Μελαγχολία Μου; My Melancholy) – 4:08
5. "Isihia" (Ησυχία; Quiet) – 2:50
6. "Ego O Dinatos" (Εγώ Ο Δυνατός; I, The Strong) – 3:11
7. "Me Poio Dikaioma" (Με Ποιο Δικαίωμα; By What Right) – 2:44
8. "Stasou" (Στάσου; Stop) – 3:20
9. "Ora Na Pigaino" (Ώρα Να Πηγαίνω; Time To Go) – 3:47
10. "O Kaliteros Ehthros Mou" (Ο Καλύτερος Εχθρός Μου; My Worst Enemy) – 3:20
11. "Ti Thimasai" (Τι Θυμάσαι; What Do You Remember) – 2:57
12. "Afou Horisame" (Αφού Χωρίσαμε; Since We've Broken up) – 2:57
13. "Tripa Stin Kardia" (Τρύπα Στην Καρδιά; Hole In My Heart) – 3:44
14. "Pos Allazoun Oi Kardies" (Πως Αλλάζουν Οι Καρδιές; How Hearts Change) – 3:15

== Chart performance ==
The album was certified double platinum on 19 July 2013. On 15 December was certified four times platinum.

Chart (2012)	Peak position
Greek Albums (IFPI Greece)	1
