= Tha Eimai Edo =

Tha Eimai Edo Θα Είμαι Εδώ

Studio album by Nikos Oikonomopoulos
- Released: 12 December 2011
- Genre: Modern laika
- Length: 54:34
- Label: Minos EMI
- Producer: Thanasis Papageorgiou

Nikos Oikonomopoulos chronology
Doro Gia Sena (2010)	Tha Eimai Edo; Θα Είμαι Εδώ (2011)	Ennoeitai (2012)

Singles from Tha Eima Edo
- 1. "Kai Ti Egine" Released: 18 November 2011; 2. "Psaxe Me" Released: 15 April 2012; 3. "Exartimenos" Released: 6 June 2012

Tha Eimai Edo (Greek: Θα Είμαι Εδώ; English: I will be here) is the fifth studio album by Greek singer Nikos Oikonomopoulos, released on 12 December 2011 by Minos EMI. The first song "Kai Ti Egine" was written by Phoebus.

== Track listing ==
1. "Kai Ti Egine" (Και Τι Έγινε; So What) – 3:41
2. "Tha Eima Edo" (Θα Είμαι Εδώ; I Will Be Here) – 4:01
3. "Kali Kardia" (Καλή Καρδιά; Good Heart) – 3:53
4. "Me Peirazei" (Με Πειράζει; It Bothers Me) – 4:24
5. "Devterolepta Tha Meino" (Δευτερόλεπτα Θα Μείνω; I Will Stay For a Few Seconds) – 3:36
6. "Irthe I Ora Na Figo" (Ήρθε Η Ώρα Να Φύγω; It's Time For Me To Leave) – 4:17
7. "Poia Zoi Na Ziso" (Ποια Ζωή Να Ζήσω; What Life Should I Live) – 4:16
8. "Pou Tha Me Pas" (Που Θα Με Πας; Where Where Will You Take Me) – 3:48
9. "Psaxe Me" (Ψάξε Με; Search For Me) – 4:08
10. "Ola Plironontai Edo" (Όλα Πληρώνονται Εδώ; Everything Will Be Paid For Here) – 3:32
11. "Hanomaste" (Χανόμαστε; We Are Lost) – 3:24
12. "Exartimenos" (Εξαρτημένος; Addicted) – 3:07
13. "Matosa Gia Sena" (Μάτωσα Για Σένα; I Bled For You) – 4:08
14. "Poutana Stin Psihi" (Πουτάνα Στην Ψυχή; A Blight On The Soul) – 4:26

== Chart performance ==
The album was certified double platinum for one week. In 2012 was certified four times platinum.

Chart	Provider	Peak position	Certification
Greek Albums Chart	IFPI Greece	1	4× Platinum
