= Gia Hilious Logous =

Gia Hilious Logous Για Χίλιους Λόγους

Studio album by Nikos Oikonomopoulos
- Released: 17 November 2014
- Studio: Argiriou Recordings studio
- Genre: Pop, Modern laika
- Length: 46:19
- Language: Greek
- Label: Minos EMI
- Producer: Thanasis Papageorgiou

Nikos Oikonomopoulos chronology
Eilikrina (2013)	Gia Hilious Logous; Για Χίλιους Λόγους (2014)	Ena Mikrofono Ki Ego (2015)

Singles from Gia Hilious Logous
- 1. "Pote" Released: 20 October 2014; 2. "Gia Hilious Logous" Released: 9 April 2015; 3. "Kane Afto Pou Xereis" Released: 29 May 2015

Gia Hilious Logous (Greek: Για Χίλιους Λόγους; English: For A Thousand Reasons) is the eighth studio album by Greek singer Nikos Oikonomopoulos. It was released on 17 November 2014 by Minos EMI and received quadruple-platinum platinum certification, selling over 50,000 units.

== Tracklist ==
No.	Title	Lyrics	Music	Length
1.	"Pote" (Ποτέ; Never)	Vasilis Giannopoulos	Christoforos Germenis	3:53
2.	"Gia Hilious Logous" (Για Χίλιους Λόγους; For A Thousand Reasons)	Eleni Giannatsoulia	Panos Kapiris	3:51
3.	"Kane Afto Pou Xereis" (Κάνε Αυτό Που Ξέρεις; Do What You Know)	Aggeliki Makrinioti	Dimitris Charmas	3:38
4.	"Na Mi Tolmiseis" (Να Μη Τολμήσεις; Don't You Dare)	Vasilis Giannopoulos	Christoforos Germenis	4:13
5.	"Skotono" (Σκοτώνω; Kill)	Eleni Giannatsoulia	Panos Kapiris	4:04
6.	"Monaxia" (Μοναξιά; Loneliness)	Nikos Doulamis	Nikos Doulamis	4:07
7.	"Tha Zitas Tin Zoi Mas Piso" (Θα Ζητάς Την Ζωή Μας Πίσω; You'll Ask For Our Life Back)	Aggeliki Makrinioti	Iordanis Pavlou	3:49
8.	"Ena Lepto" (Λεπτό; One Minute)	Aggeliki Makrinioti	Dimitris Harmas	4:05
9.	"Panselinos" (Πανσέληνος; Full Moon)	Nikos Doulamis	Nikos Doulamis	3:25
10.	"Apsihologiti" (Αψυχολόγητη; Unprecedented)	Maritta Rossi	Panagiotis Rafael	3:38
11.	"Enan Hrono Akrivos" (Έναν Χρόνο Ακριβώς; One Year Exactly)	Aggeliki Makrinioti	Iordanis Pavlou	4:10
12.	"Meta" (Μετά; After)	Vasilis Giannopoulos	Christoforos Germenis	3:22
Total length:				46:19

== Singles ==
The following singles were officially released to radio stations, some with music videos, and gained massive airplay. The songs "Tha Zitas Tin Zoi Mas Piso", "Apsihologiti" and "Enan Hrono Akrivos" was not released as single, but gained a lot of airplay.

"Pote"

It was the first single from the album and released on 20 October 2014. The music video was released on 5 December 2014, directed by Konstantinos Rigos.

"Gia Hilious Logous"

It was the second single from the album and released with the music video on 9 April 2015.

"Kane Afto Pou Xereis"

It was the third single from the album and released to radio stations on 29 May 2015.

== Credits ==
Credits adapted from liner notes.

=== Personnel ===
- Dimitris Antoniadis – drums (2, 4, 5, 6, 7, 9, 10, 11, 12)
- Christos Bousdoukos – violin (5)
- Dimitris Charmas – orchestration, programming, keyboards (3, 8)
- Dimitris Dekos – keyboards (10)
- Akis Diximos – backing vocals (9, 10)
- Christoforos Germenis – guitars (1, 12)
- Giannis Grigoriou – bass (1, 2, 4, 5, 6, 7, 9, 10, 11, 12)
- Telis Kafkas – bass (3, 8)
- Theofilos Kalmanidis – bouzouki (3)
- Telis Michael – guitars (3, 8)
- Andreas Mouzakis – drums (3, 8)
- Lefteris Pouliou – saxophone (6)
- Ilias Pourtsidis – bouzouki (7, 9, 11) / cura (9) / baglama (7, 9)
- Giorgos Retikas – guitars (2, 3, 4, 5, 6, 7, 8, 9, 10, 11, 12)
- Dimitris Stamatelopoulos – orchestration, programming, keyboards (6, 9)
- Leonidas Tzitzos – orchestration, programming, keyboards (1, 2, 5, 7, 10, 11, 12)
- Thanasis Vasilopoulos – clarinet, ney (4)

=== Production ===
- Takis Argiriou – sound engineer / mix engineer (1, 2, 4, 5, 6, 7, 9, 10, 11, 12)
- Giannis Bournias – photographer
- Dimitris Charmas – sound engineer, mix engineer (3, 8)
- Dpdesign – artwork
- Giorgos Fitas – grooming
- Giannis Ioannidis (Digital Press Hellas) – mastering
- Polina Laboglou – styling
- Thanasis Papageorgiou – executive producer
- Petros Siakavellas (Digital Press Hellas) – mastering

== Charts ==
Chart (2014)	Peak position	Certification
Greek Albums (IFPI Greece)	1	4×Platinum
