= 10 (Nikos Oikonomopoulos album) =

Studio album by Nikos Oikonomopoulos
- Released: 8 December 2017
- Recorded: 111 studio
- Genre: Pop, Modern laika, Rock
- Length: 37:31
- Label: Minos EMI
- Producer: Nikos Oikonomopoulos

Nikos Oikonomopoulos chronology
Ena Mikrofono Ki Ego (2015)	10 (2017)

Singles from 10
- 1. "Einai Kati Laika" Released: 7 November 2016; 2. "O Haraktiras" Released: 7 June 2017; 3. "Gia Kapoio Logo" Released: 16 October 2017; 4. "Parakala Na Pethano" Released: 25 January 2018; 5. "Gia Paradeigma" Released: 15 May 2018

10 (Greek: Δέκα; English: Ten) is the tenth studio album by Greek singer Nikos Oikonomopoulos. It was released on 8 December 8, 2017 by Minos EMI. and was received 2× Platinum certification.

== Track listing ==
No.	Title	Lyrics	Music	Length
1.	"Einai Kati Laika" (Είναι Κάτι Λαϊκά; It's Something Laic)	Eleni Giannatsoulia	Giorgos Sabanis	4:01
2.	"O Haraktiras" (Ο Χαρακτήρας; The Character)	Nino	Nino	3:11
3.	"Gia Kapoio Logo" (Για Κάποιο Λόγο; For Some Reason)	Eleni Giannatsoulia	Giorgos Sabanis	4:43
4.	"Parakala Na Pethano" (Παρακάλα Να Πεθάνω; Please To Die)	Nikos Sarris	Christos Dantis	3:50
5.	"An Einai Na 'Rtheis" (Αν Είναι Να 'Ρθεις; If You Should Come)	Eleni Giannatsoulia	Giorgos Sabanis	3:59
6.	"Ipologismena" (Υπολογισμένα; Calculated)	Nikos Sarris	Christos Dantis	3:40
7.	"Dikaioma Mou" (Δικαίωμά Μου; My Right)	Vasilis Giannopoulos	Iordanis Pavlou	3:14
8.	"Eimai Edo" (Είμαι Εδώ; I'm Here)	Nikos Sarris	Christos Dantis	3:20
9.	"De Sou Zitao Polla" (Δε Σου Ζητάω πολλά; I Don't Ask You Much)	Vasilis Giannopoulos	Iordanis Pavlou	3:38
10.	"Gia Paradeigma" (Για Παράδειγμα; For Example)	Nikos Sarris	Christos Dantis	3:55

== Singles ==
"Einai Kati Laika"

The song was released as a digital download on 7 November 2016 and is the lead single of the album. The video clip of the song was announced on 25 November 2016.

"O Haraktiras"

The single was released onto YouTube and released as a digital download on 7 June 2017.

"Gia Kapoio Logo"

The song was released as a digital download on 16 October 2017. The video clip of the song was announced on 16 October 2017.

"Parakala Na Pethano"

"Parakala Na Pethano" is the fourth single. The song was released as a radio single on 25 January 2018 to all radio stations in Greece.

"Gia Paradeigma"

This is the fifth single and the third song with a video clip from the album. A music video for "Gia Paradeigma" is directed by Yiannis Papadakos and was announced on 15 May 2018.

== Charts ==
Chart (2017)	Peak position
Greek Albums (IFPI Greece)	1

== Credits and Personnel ==
Personnel

- Arrangement, Keyboards, Programming: Christos Dantis (tracks: 4, 6, 8, 10), Konstantinos Pantzis (tracks: 4, 6, 8, 10), Maria Papadopoulou (tracks: 1, 3), Leonidas Tzitzos (tracks: 2, 5, 7, 9)
- Backing vocals: Akis Diximos (tracks: 5, 6, 8, 9, 10), Ismini Leivada (tracks: 1), Athena Manoukian (tracks: 1), Despina Tata (tracks: 8, 10)
- Baglama: Panagiotis Stergiou (tracks: 6)
- Bouzouki: Manolis Karantinis (tracks: 1), Panagiotis Stergiou (tracks: 6)
- Bass: Giannis Grigoriou (tracks: 1, 3, 4, 6, 7, 8, 9)
- Cümbüş, Säzi: Stavros Papagiannakopoulos (tracks: 5)
- Drums: Dimitris Antoniadis (tracks: 7, 9), Kostas Liolios (tracks: 4), Alkis Misirlis (tracks: 1, 3)
- Guitar: Christos Dantis (tracks: 4, 6, 8), Antonis Gounaris (4, 6, 8, 10), Giorgos Retikas (tracks: 2, 5, 7, 9), Evripidis Zemenidis (tracks: 1, 3)
- Percussion: Tasos Limperis (tracks: 5)
- Saxophone: Lefteris Pouliou (tracks: 10)
- Violin: Christos Mpousdoukos (tracks: 5)

Production

- Art direction: Dimitris Panagiotakopoulos
- Executive producer: Nikos Oikonomopoulos
- Grooming: Vasilis Mpouloumpasis
- Make Up: Elena Chatzinikolidou
- Mastering: Giorgos Antoniou [D.P.H.] (tracks: 5, 7, 9), Takis Argiriou [111 studio] (tracks: 2), Giannis Christodoulatos [Sweetspot studio] (tracks: 3), Giannis Ioannidis [D.P.H.] (tracks: 5, 7, 9), Konstantinos Pantzis [Power studio] (tracks: 4, 6, 8, 10), Anestis Psaradakos [Athens Mastering] (tracks: 1)
- Mixing, Recording: Takis Argiriou [111 studio] (tracks: 2, 5, 7, 9), Kostas Kalimeris [Prism studio] (tracks: 1, 3), Konstantinos Pantzis [Power studio] (tracks: 4, 6, 8, 10)
- Photographer: Panos Giannakopoulos
- Recording [Vocals]: Takis Argiriou [111 studio]
- Styling: Giannis Trakas
