= Katathesi Psihis =

Katathesi Psihis Κατάθεση Ψυχής

Studio album by Nikos Oikonomopoulos
- Released: 11 December 2009
- Genre: Modern laika
- Length: 46:53
- Label: Sony BMG Greece
- Producer: Thanasis Papageorgiou

Nikos Oikonomopoulos chronology
Akousa… (2008)	Katathesi Psihis; Κατάθεση Ψυχής (2009)	Doro Gia Sena (2010)

Singles from Katathesi Psihis
- 1. "Ti Tha Kano Me Sena" Released: 8 December 2009; 2. "Katathesi Psihis" Released: 20 April 2010; 3. "To Mavro Hroma" Released: 24 May 2010

Katathesi Psihis (Greek: Κατάθεση Ψυχής; English: Deposit Soul) is the third studio album by Greek singer Nikos Oikonomopoulos, released on 11 December 2009 by Sony BMG Greece. The album contains twelve songs with music by Marios Psimopoulos, Elekos Hristovergis, Panos Falaras while the lyrics are written by the Eleni Giannatsoulia, Spiros Giatras and Maritta Rossi.

== Track listing ==
1. "Ti Tha Kano Me Sena" (Τι Θα Κάνω Με Σένα; What Am I Going To Do With You) – 4:00
2. "Htipa" (Χτύπα; Hit) – 4:04
3. "Tipota Sto Tipota" (Τίποτα Στο Τίποτα; Nothing In Nothing) – 3:57
4. "Katathesi Psihis" (Κατάθεση Ψυχής; Deposit of the Soul) – 4:21
5. "Xekatharisa" (Ξεκαθάρισα; I’ve Left It All Behind) – 4:47
6. "Apolito" (Απόλυτο; Absolute) – 5:31
7. "Mou 'Pe Mia Psihi" (Μου 'Πε Μια Ψυχή; A Soul Told Me) – 3:46
8. "Enas Theos Xerei" (Ένας Θεός Ξέρει; Only God Knows) – 3:28
9. "Htipima Teleiotiko" (Χτύπημα Τελειωτικό; Final Blow) – 3:00
10. "Thelo Na 'Mai" (Θέλω Να 'Μαι; I Want To Be) – 3:42
11. "To Mavro Hroma" (Το Μαύρο Χρώμα; The Colour Black) – 3:46
12. "I Alitheia Na Legetai" (Η Αλήθεια Να Λέγεται; Truth Be Told) – 4:00

== Certifications ==
After its release, the album achieved platinum certification in Greece.

Provider	Certification
IFPI Greece	Platinum
