= Akousa... =

Akousa... Άκουσα…

Studio album by Nikos Oikonomopoulos
- Released: 18 December 2008
- Genre: Modern laika
- Length: 55:51
- Label: Sony BMG Greece
- Producer: Thanasis Papageorgiou

Nikos Oikonomopoulos chronology
Proti Agapi (2007)	Akousa... Άκουσα… (2008)	Katathesi Psihis (2009)

Singles from Akousa...
- 1. "Etsi Nomizeis (Kai Mi Giriseis)" Released: 28 October 2008; 2. "Heimoniase" Released: 15 December 2008; 3. "Ftaio" Released: 25 May 2009

Akousa… (Greek: Άκουσα…; English: I Heard...) is the second studio album by Greek singer Nikos Oikonomopoulos. It was released on 18 December 2008 by Sony BMG Greece. The song "Etsi Nomizeis (Kai Mi Giriseis)" was the most popular.

== Track listing ==
1. "Heimoniase" (Χειμώνιασε; Winter Has Come) – 4:27
2. "Tha Sto Kratao" (Θα Στο Κρατάω; I'll Hold It Against You) – 3:28
3. "Adiorthoti" (Αδιόρθωτη; Unchangeable) – 3:52
4. "Eho Na Matho" (Έχω Να Μάθω; I Have To Learn) – 3:28
5. "Ftaio" (Φταίω; It's My Fault) – 2:51
6. "Akousa…" (Άκουσα…; I Heard…) – 3:27
7. "Epanasindesi" (Επανασύνδεση; Reconnection) – 3:46
8. "Ti Na 'Rtho Na Kano" (Τι Να 'Ρθω Να Κάνω; What Should I Do) – 4:02
9. "Mes Stin Diki Sou Filaki" (Μες Στην Δική Σου Φυλακή; In Your Prison) – 3:48
10. "Den Eho Thesi Sta Oneira Sou" (Δεν Έχω Θέση Στα Όνειρα Σου; I No Longer Have a Place In Your Dreams) – 3:26
11. "Harakia" (Χαρακιά; Notch) – 4:07
12. "Kommatia Ta Filia" (Κομμάτια Τα Φιλιά; Kisses to Pieces) – 3:43
13. "Pistevo" (Πιστεύω; I Believe) – 4:07
14. "Eisai Oles Ekeines Mazi" (Είσαι Όλες Εκείνες Μαζί; You're All of Them Combined) – 3:06
15. "Etsi Nomizeis (Kai Mi Giriseis)" (Έτσι Νομίζεις (Και Μη Γυρίσεις); That's What You Think (So Don't Come Back) – 4:06

== Chart performance ==
The album went gold several months after release.

Chart	Provider	Certification
Greek Albums Chart	IFPI Greece	Gold
