= Doro Gia Sena =

Doro Gia Sena Δώρο Για Σένα

Studio album by Nikos Oikonomopoulos
- Released: 3 December 2010
- Genre: Modern laika
- Length: 56:15
- Label: Minos EMI
- Producer: Thanasis Papageorgiou

Nikos Oikonomopoulos chronology
Katathesi Psihis (2009)	Doro Gia Sena; Δώρο Για Σένα (2010)	Tha Eimai Edo (2011)

Singles from Doro Gia Sena
- 1. "Ximeronei" Released: 14 October 2010; 2. "Doro Gia Sena" Released: 18 February 2011; 3. "Simeiosate Diplo..." Released: 12 June 2011

Doro Gia Sena (Greek: Δώρο Για Σένα; English: A Present For You) is the fourth studio album by Greek singer Nikos Oikonomopoulos. The album was released on 3 December 2010 and is his first album with Minos EMI. It was certified platinum in its first week in the Greek Albums Chart.

== Track listing ==
1. "Ximeronei" (Ξημερώνει; Dawning) – 3:16
2. "Doro Gia Sena" (Δώρο Για Σένα; Gift For You) – 3:20
3. "Den Eimai Kanenos" (Δεν Είμαι Κανενός; I Don’t Belong to Anyone) – 3:40
4. "Alla Mou Taxane" (Άλλα Μου Τάξανε; They Promised Me Other Things) – 4:40
5. "Pare Me Mazi Sou" (Πάρε Με Μαζί Σου; Take Me With You) – 4:29
6. "Den Eimai Kala" (Δεν Είμαι Καλά; I'm Not Okay) – 3:23
7. "Den Me Noiazei Poia Isoun" (Δεν Με Νοιάζει Ποια Ήσουν; I Don't Care What You Were) – 3:38
8. "Simeiosate Diplo..." (Σημειώσατε Διπλό...; Duly Noted...) – 3:21
9. "Tha Me Vriskeis Brosta Sou" (Θα Με Βρίσκεις Μπροστά Σου; You Will Find Me Before You) – 3:42
10. "Mia Kardia Ston Anemo" (Μια Καρδιά Στον Άνεμο; Heart In The Wind) – 4:26
11. "Dos Mou Ti Zoi Mou Piso" (Δως Μου Τη Ζωή Μου Πίσω; Give Me My Life Back) – 4:43
12. "Trelos Ki Anapodos Kairos" (Τρελός Κι Ανάποδος Καιρός; Crazy And Untoward Weather) – 4:11
13. "I Agapi Einai Tragoudi (featuring Stamatis Gonidis)" (Η Αγάπη Είναι Τραγούδι; Love Is A Song) – 3:26

== Chart performance ==
The album achieved platinum certification from its first week and eventually was three times platinum.

Chart	Provider	Peak position	Certification
Greek Albums Chart	IFPI Greece	1	3× Platinum
