= InternetQ =

- Company type: Public
- Traded as: LSE: INTQ
- Industry: Mobile marketing and entertainment
- Founded: Athens, Greece (2000)
- Headquarters: London, United Kingdom
- Key people: Panagiotis Dimitropoulos (CEO)
- Products: MobiDialog; Akazoo; Minimob; Kanzaroo
- Services: Mobile marketing Mobile entertainment Mobile payments
- Revenue: ▲€ 132.39 million (2014)
- Operating income: ▲€ 10.76 million (2014)
- Net income: ▼€ 8.67 million (2014)
- Total assets: ▲€ 138.12 million (2014)
- Total equity: ▲€ 95.96 million (2014)
- Number of employees: 150+ (Q1 2014)
- Website: www.internetq.com

InternetQ is a technology company that develops and markets mobile related services through software platforms. Its main services include a social music streaming service, Akazoo, which sells digital content through mobile payment and a performance-based advertising platform for mobile apps, Minimob. Akazoo was shut down in early 2021.

InternetQ was a publicly traded company listed on the AIM market of the London Stock Exchange, under the symbol INTQ from which withdraw. As of October 2016 the company runs 24 offices around the globe.

== History ==
=== Early days ===
InternetQ was founded in 2000 by their current chief executive officer Panagiotis Dimitropoulos as a website design and development company. It later began offering mobile marketing services. In 2005 it received investment from NBGI Private Equity, and established InternetQ UK. The company also opened offices in New York in the United States and Warsaw, Poland in 2006. Its expansion continued elsewhere in Europe, including to various CIS countries.

In 2010 the company was listed on the London's AIM stock exchange and further expanded its operations into Latin America, Middle East and Africa.

=== Product development and launches ===
Akazoo was InternetQ's first social media and social networking product. It was developed in 2007 and launched in 2008. It allowed users to share text, photos and videos, to chat and play games together.

At the Mobile World Congress in February 2012, InternetQ launched the Akazoo social music platform for operators. An expansion on its previous platform, Akazoo 2.0 included functions to allow users to play, download, share, and access local and international music.

Before the Mobile World Congress in 2013, InternetQ launched a new product, called Minimob.com, targeted to developers and publishers of applications.

=== AIM listing and expansion ===
On December 10, 2010 the company was listed on the London's AIM stock exchange. It was listed with a market cap of £31 million, and ended up raising £6.8 million during its initial offering. The company also further expanded its operations into Latin America, the Middle East and Africa.

InternetQ is a member of the MEF global trade association and has an international board of directors.

=== Investments and acquisitions ===
In 2011 InternetQ announced the acquisition of IPOP Networks PTE, a Singapore-based mobile and media services business that serves mobile network operators, FMCG companies, creative agencies and traditional media companies, expanding InternetQ's footprint in the Southeast Asia region.

In 2012, InternetQ announced an investment in Aventurine SA, a digital game development company, specializing in online multiplayer role-playing games like Darkfall, and casual games for both online and mobile use.

InternetQ started 2013 with the acquisition of Atlas Interactive Deutschland GmbH. This move increased the company's reach with mobile network operators in Eastern, Western, and Central Europe. The company further expanded into Latin American markets at the beginning of 2014, entering an agreement to acquire Interacel Holdings LLC, a mobile service provider in the region and UpMobile a mobile marketing and interactive TV and radio content provider in Mexico.

== Partnerships and geographies ==
InternetQ partners with mobile network operators, internet service providers, mobile device manufacturers and app stores and runs campaigns on traditional media, text and voice services, smartphones and tablets. Sony reached a deal with InternetQ in 2013, with the tech giant agreeing to pre-load Akazoo onto new smartphones it sells in Malaysia, and to provide users with three months of free music streaming. This deal came on the heels of a similar agreement with Samsung earlier in 2013, with Samsung agreeing to load Akazoo onto its various smartphones and tablets throughout Greece. In the summer of 2013 Orange reached a bundle agreement and launched its Muzyka Tu i Tam service with Akazoo during the Orange Warsaw Music Festival.

== Business areas and products ==
=== Mobile entertainment ===
Akazoo is InternetQ's social music streaming platform. It allows for payment via mobile platforms, cutting out the need for a credit card in places where banking infrastructures are less established. Akazoo is sold direct to consumers or can be ‘white labelled’ by mobile operators, brands and device manufacturers.

=== Mobile advertising ===
One of InternetQ's original products was MobiDialog, a mobile marketing platform through which third party advertisers could submit messages to users and track interactions. Advertisements are delivered via SMS and include polling surveys, sweepstakes, coupons, mobile games and mobile music.

In 2013, InternetQ launched MiniMob.com. This platform was developed specially for application developers and publishers, who use it for mobile advertising to promote their apps.

== Controversial practices in Poland: Facebook marketing and the Polish lottery case ==
Polish news sources report that InternetQ subsidiary Mobile Dialogue engaged in controversial marketing practices aimed at subscribing users to paid services. This activity took place mostly through Facebook. News items were placed into users feeds. When a user attempted to view these items they were prompted for their cellphone number and a PIN. According to Polish news reports, users were then led into subscribing to the paid services.

In November 2011 InternetQ was sued in Polish courts over an SMS lottery they had been conducting. The plaintiffs argued that they received an SMS claiming that they had won 20,000 PLN (approx 4,700 EUR) and all they had to do was reply with a blank SMS. While they were charged for sending the SMS, they received no payout. The court initially found for the plaintiff and awarded damages of 60,000 PLN (approx 14,000 EUR), but this was overturned on appeal. The case brought discussion about the structure of Polish anti-spam laws, which did not successfully prevent such situations. As of 2011, claims against InternetQ in Poland related to their mobile marketing practices totaled €432,000.

== Investors fraud claims ==
A report published by ]Quintessential Capital Management firm, an American hedge fund based in New York City, on April 19, 2020, claimed that InternetQ's Akazoo has been deceiving investors. The firm's stock immediately tumbled in NASDAQ trading and eventually was suspended trading. On October 27, 2021 the U.S. Securities and Exchange Commission (SEC) said it had settled charges against the firm for $38.8 million after the firm allegedly defrauded investors out of tens of millions of dollars.

== Financial results ==
For the year ended 31 December 2013 InternetQ reported €104.42 million in revenue, a 42% increase over 2012. Profit before tax was €9.01 million and total assets accounted for €111.89 million.
