= Eilikrina (Nikos Oikonomopoulos album) =

Eilikrina Ειλικρινά

Studio album by Nikos Oikonomopoulos
- Released: 6 December 2013
- Genre: Modern laika
- Length: 56:23
- Label: Minos EMI
- Producer: Thanasis Papageorgiou

Nikos Oikonomopoulos chronology
Ennoeitai (2012)	Eilikrina; Ειλικρινά (2013)	Gia Hilious Logous (2014)

Singles from Eilikrina
- 1. "Se Lipamai" Released: 30 September 2013; 2. "Mi Figeis Tora" Released: 25 November 2013; 3. "Exaitias Sou" Released: 25 July 2014

Eilikrina (Greek: Ειλικρινά; English: Sincerely) is the seventh studio album by Greek singer Nikos Oikonomopoulos, released in 2013 by Minos EMI. Shortly after its release, it was reported that the album has achieved double platinum certificate in Greece.

== Track listing ==
No.	Title	Lyrics	Music	Length
1.	"Se Lipamai" (Σε Λυπάμαι; I Feel Sorry For You)	Avgi Gavrilaki	Dimitris Harmas	3:33
2.	"Mi Figeis Tora" (Μη Φύγεις Τώρα; Don’t Leave Now)	Aggeliki Makrinioti	Iordanis Pavlou	3:38
3.	"O Theos Pou Pistevo (Proskino)" (Ο Θεός Που Πιστεύω (Προσκυνώ); The God I Believe In (Worship))	Vasilis Dimas	Vasilis Dimas	2:44
4.	"Alitissa" (Αλήτισσα; Tramp)	Vasilis Dimas	Vasilis Dimas	3:22
5.	"Exaitias Sou" (Εξαιτίας Σου; Because Of You)	Eleni Giannatsoulia	Panos Kapiris	3:53
6.	"Signomi" (Συγνώμη; Sorry)	Eleni Giannatsoulia	Giorgos Sabanis	3:47
7.	"Tha Erhontai Stigmes" (Θα Έρχονται Στιγμές; There Will Be Moments)	Eleni Giannatsoulia	Dimitris Harmas	3:29
8.	"Na Skepazesai Ta Vradia" (Να Σκεπάζεσαι τα Βράδια; Cover Yourself Up At Night)	Fontas Theodorou	Vasilis Daramouskas	3:50
9.	"Osa De Mou Les" (Όσα Δε Μου Λες; The Things You Don’t Tell Me)	Fontas Theodorou	Vasilis Daramouskas	2:59
10.	"Pote De Se Xeperasa" (Ποτέ Δε Σε Ξεπέρασα; I Never Got Over You)	Vasilis Dimas	Vasilis Dimas	3:29
11.	"Ola Tha Ta Plirotheis" (Όλα Θα Τα Πληρωθείς; You Will Pay For Everything)	Vasilis Dimas	Vasilis Dimas	3:22
12.	"Na Stamatiseis" (Να Σταματήσεις; Stop)	Stratos Kaisaris	Giannis Kermanidis	3:31
13.	"Ki Istera Xipnises" (Κι Ύστερα Ξύπνησες; And Then You Realised)	Fontas Theodorou	Panos Kapiris	3:45
14.	"Oste Etsi Loipon" (Ώστε Έτσι Λοιπόν; Well Then)	Lemonis Skopelitis	Lemonis Skopelitis	2:57
15.	"Oti Agapao M' Adikei" (Ότι Αγαπάω Μ' Αδικεί; Anything I Love Does Me Wrong)	Eleni Giannatsoulia	Giorgos Sabanis	4:21
16.	"Eilikrina" (Ειλικρινά; Sincerely)	Ilias Filippou	Haris K.	3:53

== Singles ==
"Se Lipamai"

The lead single is "Se Lipamai" released on 30 September 2013. The video clip of the song was announced on 25 November 2013.

"Mi Figeis Tora"

The second single is "Mi Figeis Tora" released on 25 November 2013. The video clip of the song was announced on 9 January 2014.

"Exaitias Sou"

The third single is "Exaitias Sou". The video clip of the song was announced on 25 July 2014.

== Chart performance ==
The album was certified double platinum.

Chart (2013)	Peak position
Greek Albums (IFPI Greece)	1

== Personnel ==
- Thanasis Papageorgiou – executive producer
- Manolis Hiotis – photography
- Dimitris Panagiotakopoulos – artwork
- Giannis Ioannidis, Petros Siakavellas – mastering
- Takis Argiriou – mixing
- Alexandra Katsaiti – styling
