= MediaInspector Greece =

MediaInspector is Greece's and Cyprus's largest radio and television airplay monitoring service, providing real time reporting, music charts and statistical tools for radio and television broadcasters, artists, record companies, advertising agencies, rightholders, intellectual property rights organizations, and music industry analysts. It currently monitors more than 500 radio stations and several television channels. In 2011 became the official IFPI partner for generating Greece's TOP200 airplay chart (replacing in Nielsen's Music Control). From 2013 its airplay chart is used at Mad Video Music Awards for the category "Most popular airplay song of the year.". MediaInspector is a member of DDEX.

== See also ==
- IFPI Greece
