= Ena Mikrofono Ki Ego =

Ena Mikrofono Ki Ego Ένα Μικρόφωνο Κι Εγώ

Studio album by Nikos Oikonomopoulos
- Released: 17 December 2015
- Genre: Modern laika
- Length: 38:52
- Label: Minos EMI
- Producer: Thanasis Papageorgiou

Nikos Oikonomopoulos chronology
Gia Hilious Logous (2014)	Ena Mikrofono Ki Ego; Ένα Μικρόφωνο Κι Εγώ (2015)	10 (2017)

Singles from Ena Mikrofono Ki Ego
- 1. "An Ponas" Released: 26 October 2015; 2. "Akou Na Deis" Released: 7 January 2016; 3. "Poion Koroidevo" Released: 19 April 2016

Ena Mikrofono Ki Ego (Greek: Ένα Μικρόφωνο Κι Εγώ; English: One Microphone And I) is the ninth studio album by Greek singer Nikos Oikonomopoulos, released on 17 December 2015 by Minos EMI. The album was number one in the Greek Albums Chart, it was certified double platinum.

== Track listing ==
No.	Title	Lyrics	Music	Length
1.	"An Ponas" (Αν Πονάς; If You Suffer)	Giorgos Moukidis	Giorgos Moukidis	3:31
2.	"Akou Na Deis" (Άκου Να Δεις; Hear To See)	Aggeliki Makrinioti	Dimitris Harmas	2:38
3.	"Dio Mines" (Δυο Μήνες; Two Months)	Aggeliki Makrinioti	Vasilis Gavriilidis	3:29
4.	"Realistes" (Ρεαλιστές; Realist)	Thanos Papanikolaou	Vasilis Gavriilidis	3:34
5.	"Antio" (Αντίο; Goodbye)	Giorgos Moukidis	Giorgos Moukidis	3:49
6.	"Etsi Gennithika" (Έτσι Γεννήθηκα; Thus Was Born)	Lemonis Skopelitis	Lemonis Skopelitis	3:37
7.	"Ena Mikrofono Ki Ego" (Ένα Μικρόφωνο Κι Εγώ; One Microphone And I)	Aggeliki Makrinioti	Vasilis Gavriilidis	3:39
8.	"Poion Koroidevo" (Ποιον Κοροϊδεύω; Whom Cheat)	Aggeliki Makrinioti	Dimitris Harmas	3:16
9.	"Hronia Polla" (Χρόνια Πολλά; Happy Birthday)	Stelios Margomenos	Panos Kapiris	4:08
10.	"Koita Me Boro" (Κοίτα Με Μπορώ; See Me I Can)	Aggeliki Makrinioti	Vasilis Gavriilidis	3:24
11.	"Peritta" (Περιττά; Unnecessary)	Vasilis Karras	Giorgos Moukidis	3:47

== Singles ==
"An Ponas"

The first single is "An Ponas". The video clip of the song was released on 23 November 2015.

"Akou Na Deis"

The second single is "Akou Na Deis", released to Greek radios on 7 January 2016.

"Poion Koroidevo"

"Poion Koroidevo" is the third single, released on 19 April 2016.

== Charts ==
Chart (2016)	Peak position
Greek Albums (IFPI Greece)	1

== Personnel ==
- Thanasis Papageorgiou – executive producer
- Dimitris Panagiotakopoulos – artwork
- Stefanos Papadopoulos – photography
- Giannis Ioannidis, Giorgos Antoniou – mastering

== See also ==
- List of number-one albums in Greece
