= Mobile entertainment =

Mobile entertainment comprises a range of activities associated with mobile electronics. The definition is both somewhat subjective and in continual development, but can include purely leisure activities (music, playing games), communications (social media, instant messaging, Twitter), and activities which could also be defined as commerce (shopping).

== Definition ==
According to Moore and Rutter: "A primary difficulty when researching mobile entertainment is that of definition". It is not always clear to consumers precisely what ‘mobile entertainment’ is. The problem of producing common understandings of mobile entertainment has been previously highlighted by the Mobile Entertainment Forum (MEF) when stating that 'two different industries make up the mobile entertainment industry: entertainment and telecommunications. Mobile entertainment is created as the convergence of both industries. Each of these worlds speaks a different language, and holds different assumptions about the nature of its work' (‘Terminology of Mobile Entertainment: An Introduction’, MEF, August 2003)."

MGAIN assumes "mobile entertainment includes any leisure activity undertaken via a personal technology which is, or has the potential to be, networked and facilitates transfer of data ... over geographic distance either on the move or at a variety of discrete locations." While workable, the definition does not cover whether mobile entertainment services must interact with service providers or telcos. It does not cover whether such service would incur a cost of usage. If mobile entertainment were said to be a subset of mobile commerce, hence, it must involve transactions of economic value. "The social aspects of mobile entertainment are hidden within the phrase ‘any leisure activity’."

This article "presents a framework to examine mobile entertainment from multiple points of views. This allows future research to be conducted with the clarity of distinguishing mobile entertainment services of different domains."

== Review and redefine ==
Mobile entertainment framework

Wong and Hiew examine multiple perspectives from various players of the value web as well as researchers to bridge the gaps found in various definitions in order to reach a common understanding. The authors consider the following as key considerations in determining whether a mobile service falls under mobile entertainment category: a form of leisure activity, interaction with service providers, utilization of wireless telecommunication networks, and transaction which incur a cost upon usage. To understand mobile entertainment, three different segments are suggested in the following figure. Each segment suggests a specific set of theories. It is implicit throughout the study that mobile entertainment is any type of leisure activity on the move.

Segment 1 consists of intersection between mobile commerce and mobile entertainment, sitting on top of wireless telecommunication networks. In other words, mobile entertainment services in segment 1 must be a subset of mobile commerce, which involves exchanges of monetary value and interaction with service providers.

Segment 2 covers mobile entertainment services which utilize wireless telecommunication networks, but do not incur a cost upon usage and do not interact with service providers. For example, one may play multiplayer mobile games with friends via Bluetooth.

Segment 3 involves mobile entertainment which does not require wireless connection and transaction of an economic value. For example, one may play preinstalled single player games on a handheld device such as a mobile phone.

== Transmission of mobile entertainment ==
Mobile entertainment through SMS has expanded rapidly in Europe and Asia and it is still the main technology bearer to send mobile entertainment messages to consumers. Because SMS is the main messaging technology used by young people, it is still the most effective way of reaching this target market. SMS is also ubiquitous, reaching a wider audience than any other technology available in the mobile space (MMS, bluetooth, mobile e-mail or WAP). Due to its simplicity and low cost, SMS achieved widespread adoption in the early 2000s, particularly among users who lacked internet-enabled devices.

What enhances consumer confidence in using SMS for mobile entertainment applications is the reliability of the service. Therefore, it is important to choose the right SMS gateway provider in order to ensure quality-of-service along the whole path of the entertainment SMS until reaching the consumer's mobile.

== Scenarios ==
A mobile user connects to the Internet via his WAP-enabled mobile phone, searches for a particular ringtone and downloads it onto his mobile phone. This falls under Segment 1 where this activity utilizes wireless telecommunication networks, incurs a cost upon file download, interacts with the service provider and is a form of leisure activity. If he transfers the ringtone to his friend via Bluetooth or infrared, this falls under Segment 2 where such activity still utilizes the wireless network yet does not incur a cost upon file transfer or involves any interaction with service providers. However, if he composes a ring tone (provided if the mobile device supports composing ring tone) and sets it as default ringtone, such activity is still considered as mobile entertainment but it does not utilize the wireless network or incur a cost upon usage.

Therefore, this activity falls under Segment 3. Hence, in this scenario, the players in the value web differ in all three scenarios. The definitions for all three cases vary as well. Hence, the model in the above-mentioned framework aids the industries to determine the appropriate business model to adopt in order to target the right audience.
