= Proti Agapi =

Proti Agapi Πρώτη Αγάπη

Studio album by Nikos Oikonomopoulos
- Released: 15 November 2007
- Genre: Modern laika
- Length: 58:20
- Label: Sony BMG Greece
- Producer: Thanasis Papageorgiou

Nikos Oikonomopoulos chronology
Proti Agapi; Πρώτη Αγάπη (2007)	Akousa… (2008)

Singles from Proti Agapi
- 1. "Koita Na Mathaineis" Released: 29 March 2007; 2. "Den Eisai Entaxei" Released: 17 October 2007; 3. "Ola Gia Sena" Released: 23 March 2008

Proti Agapi (Greek: Πρώτη Αγάπη; English: First Love) is the debut studio album by Greek singer Nikos Oikonomopoulos, released on 15 November 2007 by Sony BMG Greece.

== Track listing ==
1. "Den Eisai Entaxei" (Δεν Είσαι Εντάξει; You Are Not Alright) – 3:39
2. "Enklima Kardias" (Έγκλημα Καρδιάς; Crime of the Heart) – 3:43
3. "Afto To Asteri" (Αυτό Το Αστέρι; This Star) – 3:16
4. "Epikindini Agapi" (Επικίνδυνη Αγάπη; Dangerous Love) – 3:22
5. "Ola Gia Sena" (Όλα Για Σένα; All For You) – 4:41
6. "Ta Eida Ola" (Τα Είδα Όλα; I’ve Seen It All) – 3:47
7. "De Me Simferei" (Δε Με Συμφέρει; It Doesn’t Interest Me) – 3:41
8. "Proti Agapi" (Πρώτη Αγάπη; First Love) – 3:35
9. "Perasmenes Treis" (Περασμένες Τρεις; After Three) – 2:50
10. "Opos Agapas" (Όπως Αγαπάς; The Way You Love) – 3:31
11. "Adiaforo" (Αδιαφορώ; Disinterested) – 3:59
12. "Matia Mou" (Μάτια Μου; My Eyes) – 3:52
13. "Ase Me Stin Trella Mou" (Άσε Με Στην Τρέλλα Μου; Leave Me In My Insanity) – 3:37
14. "Koita Na Mathaineis" (Κοίτα Να Μαθαίνεις; Look and Learn) – 3:32
15. "Ola Mas Horizoun" (Όλα Μας Χωρίζουν; Everything Keeps Us Apart) – 3:17
16. "Dio Spasmena Potiria" (Δυο Σπασμένα Ποτήρια; Two Broken Glasses) – 3:49
