= Nikos Oikonomopoulos =

Greek singer (born 1984)

Nikos Oikonomopoulos Νίκος Οικονομόπουλος
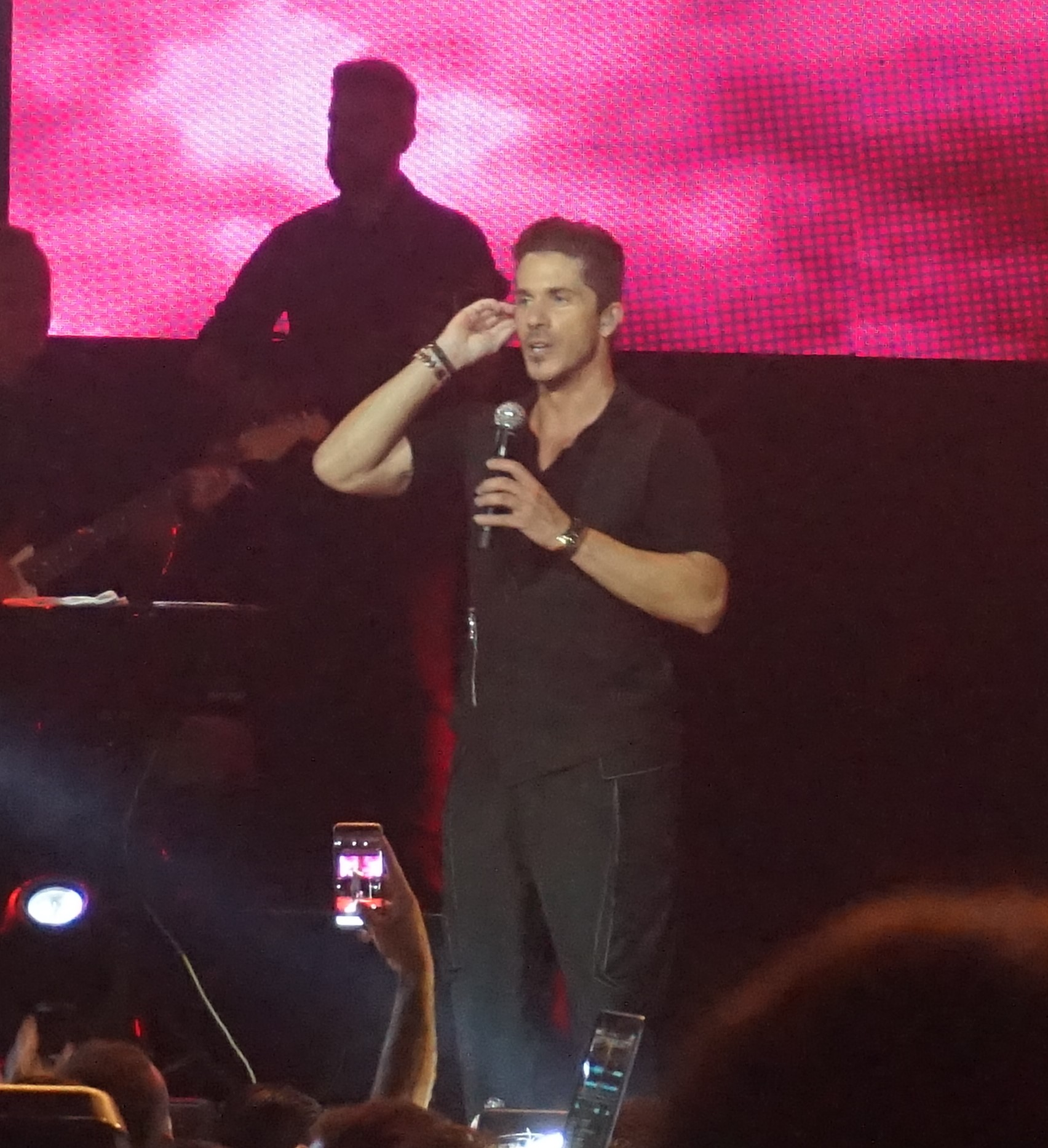
- Oikonomopoulos in 2019

Background information
- Born: Nikolaos Oikonomopoulos; 30 June 1984 (age 42); Kato Achaia, Greece
- Genre: Modern Laika
- Occupation: Singer
- Instrument: Vocals
- Years active: 2007–present
- Labels: Epic, Minos EMI, Heaven Music
- Partner: Evangelia Aravani (2017–2019)

Nikolaos "Nikos" Oikonomopoulos (Greek: Νικόλαος Νίκος Οικονομόπουλος, pronounced [nik'olaos ˈnikos ikonoˈmopulos]; born 30 June 1984) is a Greek singer. He appeared on the Greek talent show Dream Show – The Music 2, of which he was the winner. He is the top contemporary male singer in the latter half of the decade with a huge number of album sales.

== Biography ==
=== Early life ===
Nikos Oikonomopoulos was born on 30 June 1984 in Kato Achaia to his father, Argyris and his mother. He grew up in a town outside Patras, Kato Achaia. At the time of his birth, his parents were divorced and he was cared for by his grandparents and uncles and aunts. They share enough love until he grows up, his mother wants to take him to live with her, but he won’t forget those who took care of him when his parents divorced. He sang in different cities, initially in the Peloponnese and then in Northern Greece. His other jobs included working at his grandfather's fish market and working in a pizzeria. In December 2006 he emerged as the winner of the reality Alpha TV show, Dream Show – The Music 2.

=== 2007–2010: Debut album and rise in popularity ===
His first studio album was released on 15 November 2007, titled Proti Agapi (First Love). From this album several songs were successful, such as "Ola Gia Sena" ("Everything For You"), "Den Eisia Entaxei" ("You Are Not Okay"), "Koita Na Mathaineis" ("Look To Learn") and "Afto To Asteri" ("This Star").

In June 2008, he won the award for "Best New Artist" at the MAD Video Music Awards 2008. In December 2008, released a maxi single titled "Kai Mi Girizeis" (And Do Not Come Back) and his second studio album titled Akousa… (I Heard), which went gold.

In June 2009, he won the award for "Best Contemporary Laiko Video Clip" with the song "Ola Gia Sena" at the MAD Video Music Awards 2009.

In December 2009, Oikonomopoulos released Katathesi Psihis (Testimony of my Soul), which gained a platinum certification. It contained many hits like "Ti Tha Kano Me Sena" ("What Am I Going To Do With You"), "Katathesi Psihis" ("Deposit Soul"), "Mou 'Pe Mia Psihi" ("I Told Me A Soul") and "Enas Theos Kserei" ("Only God Knows").

That winter, Oikonomopolos signed with Minos EMI.

In summer 2010, he worked with Kostas Martakis at Thea, and in the winter at Fix with Nino and Ioakeim Fokas.

On 3 December 2010, Oikonomopoulos released his fourth studio album, Doro Gia Sena (A Present For You). It achieved platinum certification from its first week. It eventually became triple platinum in 2011.

=== 2011–2013: Tha Eimai Edo, Ennoeitai and Eilikrina ===
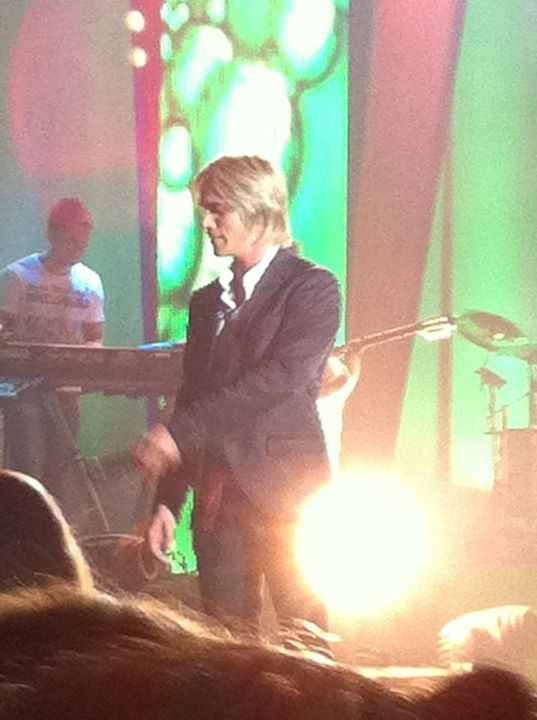
Oikonomopoulos at Thea

In December 2011, the album Tha Eimai Edo (I'm will be here) was released. Big hits from the album were the songs "Kai Ti Egine" ("So What"), "Kali Kardia" ("Good Heart"), "Psaxe me" ("Search Me") and "Exartimenos" ("Addict"). That same year, Oikonomopoulos performed at Fever for the winter season with Despina Vandi and Elli Kokkinou. The album was certified double platinum for one week.

In summer 2012, Oikonopoulos worked with Peggy Zina at Thea.

In September 2012, Tha Eimai Edo was certified four times platinum.

That same year he released Ennoeitai (It's Understood). It was certified double platinum.

On 6 December 2013, Oikonomopoulos released the new album Eilikrina (Sincerely). It had multiple hits such as "Exaitias Sou" ("Because of You"), "Mi Figeis Tora" ("Do Not Leave Now"), "Se Lipamai" ("I Feel Sorry For You") and "Na Skepazesai Ta Vradia" ("Covering The Nights"). On 16 December, Eilikrina went double platinum and Ennoeitai four times platinum.

=== 2014–present: Gia Hilious Logous, Ena Mikrofono Ki Ego and 10 ===
In summer 2014, Oikonomopoulos had a concert series at Thea with Lena Papadopoulou.

On 17 November, 2014, he released his eighth album, called Gia Hilious Logous (Because of Thousand Reasons). The first two singles, "Pote" ("Never") and "Gia Hilious Logous", had great success, and the album stands at four times platinum in Greece.

In 2015, Oikonomopoulos presented his new song "An Ponas" ("If You Suffer"). The song was the first hit of his new album Ena Mikrofono Ki Ego (One Microphone And I), released on 17 December. The album went multiplatinum in Greece.

Oikonomopoulou's new single, "Einai Kati Laika" ("It's Something Laic"), was written by Giorgos Sabanis and Eleni Giannatsoulia. The song premiered on Greek radio on 7 November 2016.

In October 2017, he released the song "Gia Kapoio Logo" ("For Some Reason"), also written by Sabanis and Giannatsoulia. It is one of the most viewed Greek songs on YouTube.

His latest album, 10, was released on 8 December 2017.

== Personal life ==
In 2017, he was in a relationship with greek actress, Evangelia Aravani. They separated in 2019.

Rumors said he used to have a relationship with Greek model Vicky Kavoura from 2013 until 2015 but 'regained his composure' in 2021.

== Discography ==
- Proti Agapi (2007)
- Akousa… (2008)
- Katathesi Psihis (2009)
- Doro Gia Sena (2010)
- Tha Eimai Edo (2011)
- Ennoeitai (2012)
- Eilikrina (2013)
- Gia Hilious Logous (2014)
- Ena Mikrofono Ki Ego (2015)
- 10 (2017)

== Awards and nominations ==
=== MAD Video Music Awards ===
Year	Recipient	Award	Result
2008	Koita Na Mathenis	Best Modern Laïko Video Clip	Nominated
2008	Koita Na Mathenis	Best New Artist	Won
2009	Ola Gia Sena	Best Laïko Video Clip	Won
2010	Etsi Nomizis (Ke Mi Girisis)	MAD Greekz Video Clip	Nominated
2011	Doro Gia Sena	MAD Greekz Video Clip	Nominated
2013	Se Lipame	MAD Greekz Video Clip	Nominated
2015	Himself	Best Adult Male	Nominated
2015	Gia Hilious Logous	Best MAD Greekz Video	Nominated
2021	Himself	Best Adult Male Singer	Nominated
2021	Skase Ena Fili	Song of the Year	Nominated
