= IFPI Greece =

Official charts provider and recording sales certification body for Greece

International Federation of the Phonographic Industry Greece, or simply IFPI Greece, is the Greek branch of the International Federation of the Phonographic Industry (IFPI) and is the official charts provider and recording sales certification body for Greece. The association compiles and publishes a Top 75 album sales chart.

The domestic trade name of IFPI Greece is "Ένωση Ελλήνων Παραγωγών Ηχογραφημάτων" (ΕΕΠΗ) (English: Association of Greek Producers of Phonograms [AGPP]). Despite that, 'IFPI Greece' is the name used to refer to the association and the name it is branded under.

== IFPI Greece charts ==
=== History ===
IFPI Greece founded the first official music charts in Greece in 1989. There were two top 20 albums charts, one for domestic and the other for foreign repertoire. The broadcast rights of the charts were acquired by ANT1 radio, and the printing rights by the Pop & Rock magazine. Prior to the introduction of industry charts by IFPI Greece, unreliable charts were being published by various magazines which lacked credibility and authority over the monitoring of record sales. By May 1991, the charts were discontinued after it was discovered that they were easily manipulated. Executives blamed artists who made themselves appear more popular by buying hundreds of copies of their own albums in an attempt to gain more bargaining power for shows and appearances. Also cited was the large number of small shops which lacked detailed sales data required as a basis toward an accurate tracking system. In response to the discontinuation, Victor (Vikos) Antippas, managing director of PolyGram Greece, referred to the charts as "an experiment that failed".

Realizing the importance of having a national chart, which "helped bring the Greek music industry back into the public eye", IFPI sought to employ a system where albums would be tracked based upon actual sales to the public, as opposed to the number of retail shipments as was previously used. It was planned for these reformed charts to be operable by early 1992. The Greek charts were then compiled by Virgin after Virgin was sold to EMI in March 1992. However, by mid-September 1992, the Greek charts were compiled by Pop & Rock magazine. The last Greek singles and albums charts to be published in Music & Media magazine was on July 3, 1993 and it was provided by Pop & Rock magazine.

In March 2009 IFPI Greece announced that they would close their charts for a period of time in order to renew their charting system. There will be a shift from wholesale (manufacturer to retailer) to point of sale (retailer to consumer) sales, as well as the integration of legal digital downloads. The implementation of a point of sale tracking method will solve the longstanding issue of accurate consumer sales tracking, a pending issue identified since 1991 with the first discontinuation of the charts. Inclusion of digital downloads will also prompt the revival of the singles chart, as the decrease in sales and releases of CD singles had led to the discontinuation of the physical singles chart. Nielsen Soundscan is already engaged in the monitoring of digital downloads sold in Greece, which is compiled into a chart currently published under the international charts section of Billboard.

In January 2010, IFPI Greece announced that they would start providing the Top 50 Foreign Albums chart on their website again, although the reformed charting system is not yet functional. Thus the Top 50 Foreign Albums chart continues to utilize the old charting system, while it is the only chart they currently provide. IFPI debuted its new chart in early October 2010. The new chart, Top 75 Combined Repertoire, is now the sole chart by IFPI Greece and lists the top 75 domestic and foreign albums in the country.

=== Current charts ===
==== Top 75 Albums Sales Combined ====
The Top 75 Album Sales Combined chart is the official albums chart of Greece, containing a combined list of Greek and foreign repertoire. It debuted in October 2010, replacing the prior separate Greek-language and foreign album charts.

==== Top 20 Airplay Chart ====
The Top 20 Airplay Chart contains songs by their count of reproductions on radio and television stations in Greece and Cyprus. It is compiled by MediaInspector Greece, an airplay monitoring service, and updated weekly. It started in 2011 with a partnership between IFPI Greece and MediaInspector as a "Top 200 Airplay Chart", and is currently published as a Top 20 at www.airplaychart.gr and at the IFPI Greece website. Three variants of the chart are published, one for Greek repertoire, one for foreign repertoire, and one combined.

==== Top 100 Digital Singles Chart ====
In 2018, IFPI started publishing the Top 100 Digital Singles Chart as a combined chart of Greek and foreign singles. The chart was originally based on streaming data provided by Akazoo, Spotify, Apple Music, Napster and Deezer, as well as song downloads from iTunes. iTunes downloads are transformed into "stream points" at some undisclosed ratio. Akazoo data stopped being considered in late May of 2020, and YouTube data was added in mid 2023. The chart was soon split into a local chart and an international chart. Starting with week 4 of 2021, the charts also included sales certifications for gold, platinum and diamond singles.

=== Past charts ===
The Top 50 Greek Albums (Top 50 Ελληνικών Αλμπουμ) chart was the official albums chart of Greece for Greek-language repertoire. Sales of domestic repertoire are higher in Greece compared to other IFPI nations, outnumbering foreign repertoire sales. The chart was discontinued in week 17, 2009.

The Top 50 Foreign Albums (Top 50 Ξένων Αλμπουμ) chart was the official sales chart for Greece of foreign repertoire. The chart was available at least until week 35, 2010 until it was replaced with the combined Top 75 albums charts.

The Top 50 Singles chart was the official sales chart for singles. It was discontinued in week 19, 2008.

The Top 30 Collections chart (Top 30 Συλλογών) was published from mid 2003 until it was discontinued in week 19, 2008.

The Top 20 DVD/Video chart was published from October 2004 until it was discontinued in week 19, 2008.

== Certifications ==
=== Current certifications ===
As of 2021, IFPI Greece provides certifications, or "awards", only for digital singles. Awards are based on the number of streams, where iTunes downloads are transformed to streams at some undisclosed ratio. The award levels are 1,000,000 streams for Gold, 2,000,000 streams for Platinum and 10,000,000 streams for Diamond. These awards started being listed on week 4, 2021.

=== Past certification levels ===
IFPI Greece published certification awards in the Top 75 Albums chart up to November 2013. Prior to that, the award levels for albums were as follows.

For domestic repertoire:

Years	Gold	Platinum
Up to 1990	50,000	100,000
1990–1997	30,000	60,000
1997–09/2002	25,000	50,000
09/2002–09/2006	20,000	40,000
09/2006–07/2008	15,000	30,000
07/2008–2020	6,000	12,000

For foreign repertoire:

Years	Gold	Platinum
1997–09/2002	15,000	30,000
09/2002–09/2006	10,000	20,000
09/2006–06/2007	7,500	15,000
06/2007–07/2008	5,000	10,000
07/2008–2020	3,000	6,000

Prior to 1997, the sales thresholds for foreign repertoire were the same as domestic ones.

==== Singles ====
Single awards were available until the cancellation of the Top 50 Singles chart in 2008. The awards levels were 3,000 for Gold and 6,000 for Platinum. Prior to June 2007, the thresholds were 7,500 and 15,000 copies, respectively.

==== DVDs ====
DVD awards were available until the cancellation of the Top 20 DVD/Video chart in 2008. The awards levels were 3,000 for Gold and 6,000 for Platinum. Prior to July 2008, the thresholds were 5,000 and 10,000 copies, respectively.

== Charts of Cyprus ==
The music industry of Cyprus closely mirrors that of Greece. Virtually all Greek and most of the foreign music releases are provided by the record companies in Greece. Certifications for sales of albums in Cyprus are different from that of Greece, with albums being certified Gold with sales (instead of shipments) of 3,000 copies and Platinum with sales of 6,000. (1,500 for Gold singles/DVDs and 3,000 for Platinum)

== Repercussions of recording infringement ==
Copyright violation is not a new phenomenon in the Greek music market. In the early 1980s, cassette reproduction in-home and in-store accounted for eight out of every ten in the market, however by the early 1990s that number dwindled to two out of every ten as a result of public awareness campaigns and the prosecution of key producers.

In May 2006, Agence France-Presse noted that "CD and DVD piracy is extremely widespread in Greece, with many Greeks preferring to purchase discs from peddlers touring cafes and restaurants rather than from licensed shops, which they see as overpriced." In its July 2006 report, the IFPI found that Greece, along with Italy and Spain, had alarmingly high copyright infringement rates compared to other EU member states. Copyright violating product was identified to account for 50% of all music sales in Greece and the IFPI blamed "an overlenient judicial system and ineffectual policing was hampering the fight against piracy." Furthermore, the IFPI calculates a loss of profit of about 150 million euros per year as of 2006. In 2008, Kathimerini newspaper noted that sales of bootlegs is thought to have cost Greece almost €1 billion in lost taxes over a nine-year period.

Another repercussion of the rampant copying throughout Greece is the marked deterioration in the sales certification thresholds of IFPI Greece. At a conference held in Athens in 2005, Chairman and CEO of IFPI John Kennedy stated:

"Along with Spain, Greece is our biggest piracy problem country in Western Europe. It joins countries like Estonia, Czech Republic and Slovakia, all with piracy levels above 45%. In fact with a piracy rate of around 50%, Greece is one of the very few Western European countries where illegal music copies almost outnumber legal sales."

The sharpest decline came with the current sales levels established in September 2008 where the gold and platinum levels for Greek repertoire were reduced by 60%, from 30,000 to 12,000 units for platinum status, and from 15,000 to 6,000 units for gold status. As a result, Greece ranks amongst the lowest of EU states with regards to legal music recording sales.

More recently, following the Greek debt crisis, a trend has been established for even prominent artists to release their albums as covermounts with national Greek newspapers, usually Real News. This facilitates a guaranteed a return for the record companies and artists in the face of otherwise low legal sales. Albums distributed in this way are not eligible for certification by IFPI Greece, so most go on to release them separately to boost sales and possibly to be certified if they gain enough sales.

=== Anti-infringement campaigns ===
2005 version of the "Piracy kills music" logo

IFPI Greece runs campaigns against copyright violation with the help of the recording industry. Beginning in 2002, during IFPI Greece's first annual "Arion Music Awards", its "Piracy Kills Music" campaign was launched, aimed at raising awareness among consumers. Campaign logos would appear on almost every album release, inserted into music videos broadcasts, and public service announcements were designed as magazine and newspaper ads. The slogan was also heard regularly in radio spots of major radio stations.

From 2002 to 2004, the slogan appeared as a logo featuring an open, red-colored hand print in the background. In 2005, the logo was updated with a differently stylized straight red-colored hand containing a black disc in its palm, with the "Piracy Kills Music" slogan appearing as caption below it. In 2007, IFPI Greece changed its anti-infringement slogan to "Let Music Live" which would appear as a caption to a colorful musical note. This tactic of imprinting CDs and music videos appears to be fading as fewer labels have chosen to continue this practice since 2009.

== Award ceremonies ==
=== Arion Music Awards (2002–2007) ===
The Arion Music Awards, named after the Ancient Greek poet Arion, were the official industry awards organized by Greece's charting authority, IFPI Greece. The awards debuted in 2002 following the discontinuation of the "Pop Corn Music Awards", which were organized by the defunct Greek magazine "Pop Corn" from the early 1990s until 2001. The Arions were broadcast by Mega Channel in their first five years before moving to ANT1 channel later. In the first years, the awards were praised by industry and viewers alike, helping to demonstrate to audiences the industry behind the music and by raising awareness on issues of bootlegged and counterfeit CDs. They also effectively balanced the majority of genres present in the local market. The awards have been put on hiatus since 2007 for various reasons ranging from falling TV ratings, low artist attendance, and to a general crisis in Greek discography attributed to falling sales and heavy infringement. MAD Video Music Awards presented by music television station MAD TV, which primarily awards music videos, is currently the only mainstream music award in Greece.

== See also ==
- International Federation of the Phonographic Industry (IFPI)
- List of music recording certifications
- List of number-one albums in Greece
