= Katy Garbi discography =

Katy Garbi Greece & Cyprus discography
- Studio albums: 20
- Extended plays: 3
- Soundtrack albums: 2
- Live albums: 2
- Compilation albums: 1
- Singles: 2
- Collaborations: 22
- CD singles: 2
- Digital releases: 6
- Videography: see link

This page includes the discography of Greek singer Katy Garbi.

Starting in 1989 with her first album, Garbi has released 20 albums in total along with several compilations, live albums and CD singles. Garbi has sold over 2 million copies and she is among the most well known singers in Greece. In the 1990s, Garbi was first in sales for female singers in Greece. Her albums Arhizo Polemo and Evaisthiseis both achieved multi-platinum status and are among the top 10 selling CDs of the 1990s, while her album To Kati (4×Platinum) was one of the best selling CDs in the 2000s.

== Studio albums ==
- * denotes unknown or unavailable information.

Year	Album	Peak chart positions		Sales	Certifications (sales thresholds)
Year	Album	GRE	CYP	Sales	Certifications (sales thresholds)
1989	Prova: Release: 3 April; Label: CBS; Formats: LP, Cassette, CD	*		Greece: 10,000^	–
1990	Gialia Karfia: Release: 30 April; Label: CBS; Formats: LP, Cassette, CD	*		Greece: 20,000^	–
1991	Entalma Sillipseos: Release: 9 September; Label: Sony Music, CBS; Formats: LP, Cassette, CD	*		Greece: 30,000^	Gold
1992	Tou Feggariou Anapnoes: Release: 12 October; Label: Sony Music, CBS; Formats: LP, Cassette, CD	*		Greece: 50,000^	Gold
1993	Os Ton Paradeiso: Release: 1 November; Label: Sony Music, CBS; Formats: LP, Cassette	*		Greece: 60,000^	Platinum
1994	Atofio Hrisafi: Release: 14 November; Label: Sony Music, CBS; Formats: LP, Cassette, CD	1		Greece: 120,000^	2×Platinum
1996	Arhizo Polemo: Release: 13 May; Label: Sony Music; Formats: LP, Cassette, CD	1		Greece: 180,000^ Cyprus: 12,000^	GRE: 3×Platinum; CYP: 2×Platinum
1997	Evaisthisies: Release: 20 October; Label: Sony Music; Formats: LP, Cassette, CD	1		Greece: 160,000^ Cyprus: 14,000^	GRE: 3×Platinum; CYP: 2×Platinum
1998	Hristougenna Me Tin Katy: Release: 16 November; Label: Sony Music; Formats: Cassette, CD	4	*	Greece: 50,000^	Platinum
1999	Doro Theou: Release: 21 June; Label: Sony Music; Formats: Cassette, CD	1	2	Greece: 80,000^ Cyprus: 10,000^	GRE & CYP: Platinum
2000	To Kati: Release: 10 April; Label: Sony Music; Formats: Cassette, 2×CD	1		Greece: 240,000^ Cyprus: 30,000^	GRE: 4×Platinum; CYP: 3×Platinum
2001	Apla Ta Pragmata: Release: 17 December; Label: Sony Music; Formats: Cassette, 2×CD	1		Greece: 120,000^ Cyprus: 20,000^	GRE & CYP: 2×Platinum
2003	Emmones Idees: Release: 17 October; Label: Sony Music; Formats: Cassette, CD+DVD	1		Greece: 60,000^ Cyprus: 10,000^	GRE & CYP: Platinum
2005	Eho Sta Matia Ourano: Release: 22 April; Label: Sony Music; Formats: CD, Digital Download	2		Greece 30,000^ Cyprus: 5,000^	GRE & CYP: Gold
2006	Pos Allazei O Kairos: Release: 23 October; Label: Sony Music; Formats: CD, Digital Download	5	4	Greece: 15,000^	Gold
2008	Kainourgia Ego: Release: 22 December; Label: Sony Music; Formats: CD, Digital Download	1	*	Greece: 5,000^	–
2011	Pazl: Release: 19 February; Label: Universal Music Greece; Formats: CD, Digital Download	8	*	Greece: 3,000^	–
2013	Buona Vita: Release: 8 June; Label: EGEA Music; Formats: CD, Digital Download	*	*	*	
2013	Perierges Meres: Release: 10 December; Label: Front Seat, Universal Music Greece; Formats: CD, Digital Download	4	*	Greece: 20,000^	Platinum
2017	Spase Tous Deiktes: Release: 20 December; Label: Panik Platinum; Formats: CD, Digital Download	5	*	Greece: 6,000^	Gold
"–" denotes releases that did not chart or was not released

== Live albums ==
- * denotes unknown or unavailable information.

Year	Album details	Peak chart positions		Sales	Certifications (sales thresholds)
Year	Album details	GRE	CYP	Sales	Certifications (sales thresholds)
2007	18 Hronia Live: Release: 5 December; Label: CBS; Formats: CD	18	4	Greece: 20,000^	Gold
2020	30 Hronia Katy Garbi (Live Katrakio 2019): Release: 13 April; Label: Panik Records; Formats: Digital Release	5	*	Greece: 15,000^	Platinum

== Official compilations ==
- * denotes unknown or unavailable information.

Year	Album details	Peak chart positions		Sales	Certifications (sales thresholds)
Year	Album details	GRE	CYP	Sales	Certifications (sales thresholds)
2002	Hitmix: Release: 8 July; Label: Sony Music, CBS (#CK-45202); Formats: CD, Cassette	7	*	*	
2013	Apo Kardias: Release: 23 March; Label: Sony Music, Columbia; Formats: CD, Digital *Includes 2 new tracks	4	*	25,000^	Platinum

== EPs ==
- * denotes unknown or unavailable information.

Year	Album details	Peak chart positions		Sales	Certifications (sales thresholds)
Year	Album details	GRE	CYP	Sales	Certifications (sales thresholds)
2000	Ti Theloune Ta Matia Sou: Release: 15 December; Label: Sony Music; Formats: CD, Cassette	2	1	Greece: 30,000^	Platinum
2002	Remix Plus: Release: 10 May; Label: Sony Music; Formats: CD, Cassette	11	10	Greece: 15,000^	Gold
2002	Mia Kardia: Release: 8 November; Label: Sony Music; Formats: CD, Cassette	1		Greece: 60,000^	3×Platinum
2004	Galazio Kai Lefko + Remixes: Release: 30 July; Label: Sony Music; Formats: CD, Cassette	2		Greece: 15,000^	Gold
2015	Kalbine Sor: Release: 17 December; Label: 2645 Records (Turkish label); Formats: Digital download	*			

- Note: Singles without chart positions may have charted but there is no information currently available.

== Singles ==
- Note: This list includes CD singles and digital downloads

Year	Title	Album	Notes
2000	"Ti Theloune Ta Matia Sou" (What Do Your Eyes Want)	Apla Ta Pragmata	CD single; Platinum certification; Included collaboration with band Exis.
2006	"Isovios Desmos" (Eternal Bond)	Pos Allazei O Kairos	Digital release; First digital download and ringtone in Greece; Collaboration with Fame Story IV contestant Stathis Raftopoulos
2008	"Tzini" (Radio Edit Mix) (Genie)	Original song from 1990 Album; Gyalia Karfia	Digital release; Promotional Remix complete with new vocals, remixed by Giorgos Alkaios and Dionysis Schinas
2016	"Disko Partizani" (remake of Shantel hit)	Non-album release	Digital release; Written by Stefan Hantel and Giannis Gounas
2016	"Savvatovrado" (Saturday Night)	Non-album release	Digital release; Written by Marios Psimopoulos and Eleni Giannatsoulia
2019	"Ilios De Vgeni An Den Peis Kalimera" (Sun Does Not Come Out Unless You Say Good Morning)	Scheduled Album by Phoebus	Digital release; Written by Phoebus
2019	"Tha Melagholiso (OtherView Remix - MAD VMA 2019) (I Will Be Sad)	Scheduled Album by Phoebus	Digital release; Featuring the group Alcatrash; Written by Phoebus
2019	"Kormia Hamena" (Lost Bodies)	Scheduled Album by Phoebus	Digital release; Written by Phoebus
2020	"Kivotos (2020 Version)" (Arc)	Scheduled Album by Phoebus	Digital release; Featuring Antonis Remos; Written by Phoebus
2020	"S' Opoion Areso" (Whoever I Like)	Scheduled Album by Phoebus	Digital release; Written by Phoebus
2021	"Atofio Hrisafi" (Pure Gold)	Scheduled Album by Phoebus	Digital release; Featuring Dionisis Shinas; Written by Phoebus
2021	"Ama Figo" (If I Leave)	Scheduled Album by Phoebus	Digital release; Written by Phoebus

== Soundtracks ==
Year	Title	Film/Series	Distribution	Credits
1995	"Tzin kai Tseri"	Tzin kai Tzeri (Television series)	Mega Channel	Music/lyrics: Phoebus
2005	"Pame Gi'Alla Na Les"	Oi Ateriastoi (Television Series)	Mega Channel	Music/lyrics: Dionysis Schinas
2015	"Na Mou Milas Ston Eniko"	I Gabri Tis Eftihias (Greek Film)	Spentzos Film Panik Platinum	Christos Papadopoulos and Giannis Sinnis
2015	"Foutnono Kai Ligizo" Duet with Kostas Karafotis	I Gabri Tis Eftihias (Greek Film)	Spentzos Film Panik Platinum	Christos Papadopoulos and Giannis Sinnis
2015	"Ta Pano Kato Mas"	I Gabri Tis Eftihias (Greek Film)	Spentzos Film Panik Platinum	Christos Papadopoulos and Giorgos Kannelopoulos

== Collaborations ==
Year	Title of Song	Featuring	Album/Single
1992	"Kathe Fora Pou Gelaei Ena Paidi"	Various Artists (Mando, Alexia, Efi Sarri, Thanos Kalliris, Sakis Rouvas, Kostas Tournas, Kostas Charitodiplomenos, Evridiki, Konstantina, Stefanos Korkolis, Dakis, Sofia Arvaniti, Paschalis, Kostas Mpigalis) charity single	Charity Album:Kathe Fora Pou Gelaei Ena Paidi (CD single)
1993	"Erota, Erota Mou"	Thanos Kalliris	Compilation Album:1500 filakia fresh hits
1996	"Ftou Xelefteria!"	Children's Choir Of Spiros Labrou	Arhizo Polemo, To Kati
1997	"I Patrida Mou"	Antonis Vardis	Evaisthisies, To Kati
1997	"Asimfonia Haraktiron"	Antonis Remos	Evaisthisies, To Kati
1998	"O Antras Tis Zois Mou"	Pheobus Deliborias	Featured Artist's Album:Halia
2000	"Epitelous"	Natasa Theodoridou	To Kati
2000	"Zisame"	Dionysis Shinas	To Kati
2000	"Kalitera I Dyo Mas"	Anna Vissi	Featured Artist's Album: Kravgi
2001	"Stigmes"	Kostas Tournas	Apla Ta Pragmata
2001	"Adiko Kai Krima"	Antique	Apla Ta Pragmata, Featured Artist's Album: Me Logia Ellinika
2001	"Ti Theloune Ta Matia Sou"	Exis	Apla Ta Pragmata
2002	"Tha Meinei Metaxi Mas"	Giorgos Tsalikis	Mia Kardia
2002	"To Thelo Toso"	Fugitive B	Mia Kardia
2003	"Poso Tha Thela"	Yiannis Vardis	Emmones Idees
2003	"Emeis"	Tolis Voskopoulos	Featured Artist's Album:Kali Sou Tihi
2004	"Meiname Moni"	Dionysis Shinas	Featured Artist's Album:Pali Edo
2005	"Spaciba Baby"	Christos Dantis	Eho Sta Matia Ourano
2005	"Aeraki"	667	Featured Artist's Album: I 667 Se Tragoudia Pou Tha Legane Moni Tous...An Itane Kiries
2006	"Isovios Desmos"	Stathis Raftopoulos	Pos Allazei O Kairos
2006	"Stohos"	Nazar	Compilation Album:Albazaar Vol.3
2006	"Esena Mono" (Leili Dance Remix)	Mokka	Compilation Album:Albazaar Vol.3
2008	"Kainourgia Ego"	Thirio	Kainourgia Ego
2013	"Zontanos Ouranos"	Zoe Tiganouria	Apo Kardias
2013	"Ierosilia (Mad VMA Version"	Nikiforos & REC	Mad TV
2013	"Buona Vita"	Ornella Vanoni	Buona Vita
2013	"Ti Sento"	Carlo Marrale	Buona Vita
2013	"Deixe mou"	Giorgos Papadopoulos	Perierges Meres
2014	"Na Se Zilevoun Pio Kala"	Giorgos Tsalikis	Gabi Music Video Single
2015	"Anemodarmena Ipsi (Mad TV Version)"	Stan	Perierges Meres
2015	"Fountono Kai Ligizo"	Kostas Karafotis	From Soundtrack:I Gabri Tis Eftihias
2015	"Koita S'Agapao/Harikalar Diyari"	Burak Kut	Spase Tous Deiktes
2015	"Ti Kardia Sou Rota/Kalbine Sor"	Burak Kut	Kalbine Sor
2017	"Oute Leksi"	Vasilis Karras	Spase Tous Deiktes
2017	"Ziliaris Ouranos"	Evridiki	25 Gia Panta
