= Katy Garbi videography =

Katy Garbi Videography discography
- Video albums: 4
- Music videos: 102

Videography of Greek singer Katy Garbi.

== Music videos ==
- These are also known as Singles, however they are only released as Radio Singles and Music Videos, not hard copy singles as is common in Greece and Cyprus.

Since 1987, ninety-nine official music videos have been released to complement radio singles spawned by Garbi's commercial releases and other collaborations. Garbi has worked with various music video directors throughout her career including Vicky Velopoulou, Giorgos Kavalos/View Studio, Kostas Kapetanidis, Kostas Sofoulis, Vaggelis Kalaitsis and Manwlis Tzirakis.

=== 1980s ===
Year	Song	Album	Director(s)
1987	"Sto San Trope"	Ta 10 Dekaria No 1	Not available
1989	"Ah, Afto M'Aresei"	Ta 10 Dekaria No 2	Not available
1989	"Prova"	Prova	Not available
1989	"Toso Poli"	Prova	Not available
1989	"Hrostame"	Prova	Not available

=== 1990s ===
Year	Song	Album	Director(s)
1990	"Gialia Karfia"	Gialia Karfia	Dimitris Sotas
1990	"Fantasmataki"	Gialia Karfia	Dimitris Sotas
1991	"Entalma Silepseos"	Entalma Silepseos	Vasilis Konstantoulas
1991	"Prosopo Me Prosopo"	Entalma Silepseos	Dimitris Sotas
1991	"Svise Me"	Entalma Silepseos	Dimitris Sotas
1991	"Thelo Na Kano Mazi Sou Mia Trela"	Entalma Silepseos	Dimitris Sotas
1992	"Pes To M'ena Fili"	Tou Feggariou Anapnoes	Giorgos Sofoulis
1992	"Tou Feggariou Anapnoes"	Tou Feggariou Anapnoes	Giorgos Sofoulis
1992	"Zilia Mou"	Tou Feggariou Anapnoes	Giorgos Sofoulis
1992	"Den Einai I Proti Fora"	Tou Feggariou Anapnoes	Giorgos Sofoulis
1992	"Lathos Porta"	Tou Feggariou Anapnoes	Giorgos Sofoulis
1992	"S' agapo pio poli"	Tou Feggariou Anapnoes	Giorgos Sofoulis
1992	"Kathe Fora Pou Gelaei Ena Paidi" (Charity single featuring various)	Kathe Fora Pou Gelaei Ena Paidi	Miltos Kakridis
1992	"Sato Aris - Gia Ti Zoi" (Pashalis, Katy Garbi, Mando & Sakis Rouvas)	Gia Ti Zoi	Vasilis Harakas
1993	"Ellada, Hora Tou Fotos"	Os Ton Paradeiso	Giorgos Sofoulis
1993	"Nai Yparho Ego"	Os Ton Paradeiso	D.Galanis & N.Patrelakis
1993	"O Kafes"	Os Ton Paradeiso	D.Galanis & N.Patrelakis
1993	"Os Ton Paradeiso"	Os Ton Paradeiso	Giorgos Sofoulis
1993	"Derti"	Os Ton Paradeiso	Giorgos Sofoulis
1994	"Stigmes" (Kostas Tournas featuring Katy Garbi)	Apla Ta Pragmata	Not available
1994	"Ksipoliti Horevo"	Atofio Hrysafi	Nikos Soulis/Traffic
1994	"Atofio Hrysafi"	Atofio Hrysafi	Giorgos Sofoulis
1994	"Min Me Sigrinis"	Atofio Hrysafi	Giorgos Louizos
1994	"Kolasi"	Atofio Hrysafi	Giorgos Louizos
1994	"Se Poliorkia (Pes Pes)"	Atofio Hrysafi	Giorgos Louizos
1995	"Zisame" (Dionysis Schinas featuring Katy Garbi)	S'Agapo	Kostas Kapetanidis
1996	"Tha Melaholiso"	Arhizo Polemo	Giorgos Sofoulis
1996	"Hamena"	Arhizo Polemo	Giorgos Sofoulis
1996	"Perasmena Ksehasmena"	Arhizo Polemo	Giorgos Sofoulis
1996	"1,000,000 Nihtes"	Arhizo Polemo	Giorgos Sofoulis
1996	"Arhizo Polemo"	Arhizo Polemo	Giorgos Gavalos/View Studio
1996	"Mia Fora Ki Enan Kairo"	Arhizo Polemo	Giorgos Gavalos/View Studio
1996	"Apo Do Kai Pio Pera"	Arhizo Polemo	Vaggelis Kalaitzis
1997	"Ierosilia"	Evaisthisies	Giorgos Gavalos/View Studio
1997	"Evaisthisies"	Evaisthisies	Giorgos Gavalos/View Studio
1997	"I Patrida Mou" (featuring Antonis Vardis)	Evaisthisies	Dimitris Sotas
1997	"Mou Leipis"	Evaisthisies	Vaggelis Kalaitzis
1997	"Asimfonia Haraktiron" (featuring Antonis Remos)	Evaisthisies	Vaggelis Kalaitzis
1997	"Kivotos"	Evaisthisies	Vaggelis Kalaitzis
1997	"Triferotita"	Evaisthisies	Vaggelis Kalaitzis
1997	"Apozimiosi"	Evaisthisies	Vaggelis Kalaitzis
1998	"Touli Gia To Hristouli" (featuring Konstantinos Paliatsaras)	Hristougenna Me Tin Katy	Giorgos Gavalos/View Studio
1998	"O Ai Vasilis Pali Tha 'rthei"	Hristougenna Me Tin Katy	Giorgos Gavalos/View Studio
1998	"O Hakim Apo Tin Afriki"	Hristougenna Me Tin Katy	Giorgos Gavalos/View Studio
1998	"Hristougenna"	Hristougenna Me Tin Katy	Giorgos Gavalos/View Studio
1998	"Hristos Gennatai"	Hristougenna Me Tin Katy	Giorgos Gavalos/View Studio
1998	"Ora Hristougennon"	Hristougenna Me Tin Katy	Giorgos Gavalos/View Studio
1998	"Rountolf To Elafaki"	Hristougenna Me Tin Katy	Giorgos Gavalos/View Studio
1998	"To Nanourisma Tis Marias"	Hristougenna Me Tin Katy	Giorgos Gavalos/View Studio
1998	"Ton Hristougennon Kampanes"	Hristougenna Me Tin Katy	Giorgos Gavalos/View Studio
1998	"O Heimonas O Varis"	Hristougenna Me Tin Katy	Giorgos Gavalos/View Studio
1999	"Doro Theou"	Doro Theou	Giorgos Gavalos/View Studio
1999	"Agkyres"	Doro Theou	Giorgos Gavalos/View Studio
1999	"Aponomi Dikaiosinis"	Doro Theou	Giorgos Gavalos/View Studio

=== 2000s ===
Year	Song	Album	Director(s)
2000	"To Kati"	To Kati	Kostas Kapetanidis
2000	"To Kati (MAD Version)"	To Kati	Kostas Kapetanidis
2000	"Epitelous" (featuring Natasa Theodoridou)	To Kati	Kostas Kapetanidis
2000	"To Lathos"	To Kati	Giorgos Gavalos/View Studio
2000	"Kalitera I Dio Mas (Version A)" (Anna Vissi featuring Katy Garbi)	Kravgi	Giorgos Gavalos/View Studio
2000	"Kalitera I Dio Mas (Version B)" (Anna Vissi featuring Katy Garbi)	Kravgi	Giorgos Gavalos/View Studio
2001	"Ti Theloune Ta Matia Sou (Club Mix)"	Apla Ta Pragmata	Giorgos Gavalos/View Studio
2001	"Apla Ta Pragmata"	Apla Ta Pragmata	Giorgos Gavalos/View Studio
2002	"Viastika"	Apla Ta Pragmata	Kostas Kapetanidis
2002	"Thelo Apopse Na Horepso"	Apla Ta Pragmata	Kostas Kapetanidis
2002	"M'Eheis Arrostisei"	Mia Kardia	Giorgos Gavalos/View Studio
2003	"Tha meinei Metaxi Mas" (featuring Giorgos Tsalikis)	Mia Kardia	Kostas Kapetanidis
2003	"Na Pernas"	Emmones Idees	Manolis Tzirakis
2003	"Poso Tha Thela" (featuring Giannis Vardis)	Emmones Idees	Manolis Tzirakis
2004	"Esena Mono"	Emmones Idees	Hristos Nikoleris
2004	"Emmones Idees Medley"	Emmones Idees	Kostas Kapetanidis
2004	"Katapliktiko"	Galazio Kai Lefko	Kostas Kapetanidis
2005	"Akouse Agori Mou"	Eho Sta Matia Ourano	Giorgos Gavalos/View Studio
2005	"Spaciba Baby" (featuring Christos Dantis)	Eho Sta Matia Ourano	Giorgos Gavalos/View Studio
2005	"Akouse Agori Mou (MAD VMA Version)"	Eho Sta Matia Ourano	Stefano Sarantini
2006	"Stohos" (Nazar featuring Katy Garbi)	Al Bazaar 3	Thanos Komozias
2006	"Esena Mono (Leili Remix)" (Mokka vs Katy Garbi)	Al Bazaar 3	Thanos Komozias
2006	"Pos Allazei O Kairos"	Pos Allazei O Kairos	Manolis Tzirakis
2007	"Afti"	Pos Allazei O Kairos	Giorgos Gavalos/View Studio
2009	"Kainourgia Ego" (featuring Thirio)	Kainourgia Ego	John Mitropoulos
2009	"Afto Aksizo"	Kainourgia Ego	Not available

=== 2010s ===
Year	Song	Album	Director(s)
2013	"Ti Sento" (featuring Carlo Marrale)	Buona Vita	Vicky Vellopoulou
2013	"Ierosilia (Mad VMA Version)" (Nikiforos & REC featuring Katy Garbi)	Perierges Meres	Thanos Komozias
2013	"Anemodarmena Ypsi"	Perierges Meres	Vicky Vellopoulou
2014	"Psefti"	Perierges Meres	Vicky Vellopoulou
2014	"Pame Finale"	Perierges Meres	Vicky Vellopoulou
2014	"Na Se Zilevoun Pio Kala" (Giorgos Tsalikis featuring Katy Garbi)	Non Album	Adonis Sotiropoulos
2014	"Logia Meli (Aegean Blue remix)"	Perierges Meres	Vicky Velopoulou
2015	"Na Mou Milas Sto Eniko"	Gabri Tis Eftihias OST	Vicky Velopoulou
2015	"Anemodarmena Ypsi (Mad VMA Version)" (Stan featuring Katy Garbi)	MAD VMA 2015	Kostas Kapetanidis
2015	"Koita S'agapo"	Spase Tous Deiktes	Vicky Velopoulou
2016	"Koita S'agapo" (featuring Burak Kut)	Spase Tous Deiktes	Vicky Velopoulou
2017	"Avrio"	Spase Tous Deiktes	Vicky Velopoulou
2017	"Vale Mia Teleia"	Spase Tous Deiktes	Vicky Velopoulou
2019	"Ilios De Vgeni An Den Peis Kalimera"	Non Album	Giannis Papadakos
2019	"Tha Melagholiso (OtherView Remix - MAD VMA 2019)" (featuring Alcatrash)	MAD VMA 2019	Kostas Kapetanidis
2019	"Kormia Hamena"	Non Album	Giorgos Gavalos

=== 2020s ===
Year	Song	Album	Director(s)
2020	"S' Opoion Areso"	Non Album	Giorgos Gavalos
2021	"Ama Figo"	Non Album	Alex Konstantinidis

== Video releases ==
Garbi's video album releases include one DVD music video collection, and studio albums with bonus video material.

Year	Title	Number of clips	Extras
2020	30 Hronia Katy Garbi (Live Katrakio 2019)	DVD with three hours of concert footage	The physical version of the album contained all seventy-two tracks from the digital release of the concert into three CDs, as well as three hours of concert footage on DVD. The package also contained 80-pages worth of artwork from Garbi's 30 years of discography.
2003	The Video Collection	35 music videos	The DVD also includes a discography listing, an artist biography and exclusive photos. It was certified gold.
2003	Emmones Idees	2 music videos, and behind-the-scenes material on bonus DVD	Features video clips "Tha Minei Metaxi Mas "(duet with Giorgos Tslikis) and "M'Eheis Arostisei" both from 2002 EP Mia Kardia. It also includes a behind the scenes video of the making of Tha Minei Metaxi Mas and a discography listing.
1999	Doro Theou	1 music video on PC readable CD	Features the music video "Doro Theou".
