= List of awards and nominations received by Katy Garbi =

Katy Garbi awards and nominations
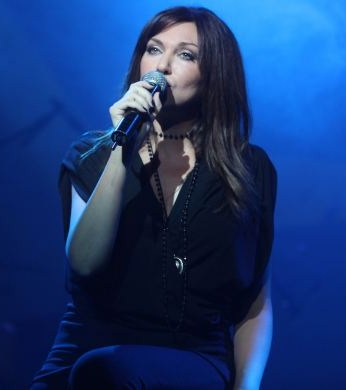
- Garbi performing at Polis Studio in 2013
Award	Wins	Nominations
Arion Music Awards	1	5
Eurovision awards	0	1
MAD Video Music Awards	2	10
Pop Corn Music Awards	12	33+
Super Music Awards	0	7
- Totals
Awards won	15
Nominations	47+

This page features a list of awards and nominations received by Greek singer and actress Katy Garbi. Since making her professional music debut in 1987 Garbi has released 20 studio albums: Prova (1989), Gyalia Karfia (1990), Entalma Silepseos (1991), Tou Feggariou Anapnoes (1992), Os Ton Paradeiso (1993), Atofio Hrysafi (1994), Arhizo Polemo (1996), Evaisthisies (1997), Hristougenna Me Tin Katy (1998), Doro Theou (1999), To Kati (2000), Apla Ta Pragmata (2001), Emmones Idees (2003), Eho Sta Matia Ourano (2005), Pos Allazei O Kairos (2006), Kainourgia Ego (2008), Pazl (2011), Buona Vita (2013), Perierges Meres (2013), Spase Tous Deiktes (2017). Garbi has also released two live albums: 18 Hronia Live (2007) and 30 Hronia Katy Garbi (Live Katrakio 2019) (2020). Garbi had her biggest commercial success with Arhizo Polemo and Evaisthisies, two of the highest selling albums of the 1990s (decade), followed by the double To Kati, which is one of the best-selling albums of the 2000s (decade) in Greece. Her albums have been released on Sony Music Entertainment Greece (1989–2009, 2013), Universal Music Greece (2010–2013) and Panik Platinum (2016–present). She has released material on Incipit Records, Front Seat, Planetworks and 2645 Records.

Garbi began her music career as a duo with her sister, Liana Garbi as Adelfes Garbi. Breaking away from the duo, Garbi featured on compilation albums Ta Deka Dekaria Vol 1 and Vol 2, which were followed by her debut solo album Prova. In 1992, Garbi's fourth album Tou Feggariou Anapnoes was certified gold and spawned Garbi's first commercial hit "Pes To M'Ena Fili". This led to her participating in the Eurovision Song Contest 1993 with "Ellada, Hora Tou Fotos", taking 9th place. The same year Garbi began collaborating with songwriter Phoebus in a partnership that resulted in 1 gold, 1 platinum and 3 multi-platinum albums.

Garbi's popularity culminated in the mid-1990s early-2000s (decade), becoming a prominent performer of the laiko-pop genre reigning at the time. The first annual music awards were materialized in Greece with the launch of the Pop Corn Music Awards; in 1997 Garbi won four awards for her album Arhizo Polemo. She was awarded album of the year and song of the year in 1999, for album Evaisthisies and its title track, respectively. Garbi has also received one Arion Music Award, and received two honorary MAD Video Music Award for her 30 years of discography in 2019 and for outstanding contribution to the Greek music industry in 2022 citing sales in excess of 2,000,000. She has been nominated for awards in laïko, contemporary laïko, pop, and dance categories and has won 12 recognized awards from over 45 nominations.

This list includes only recognized awards and not polls and other awards. Also, the list may be incomplete due to the lack of sources on Greek awards prior to the new 2000 millennium.

== Arion Music Awards ==
The Arion Music Awards are the official Greek music industry awards by IFPI Greece since 2002, after the Pop Corn Music Awards, which were organized by the Greek magazine Pop Corn from 1992–2001, were discontinued. The Arion Awards were broadcast by Mega Channel in their first five years before moving to ANT1 channel. The awards have not been held since 2007 for various reasons. Katy Garbi has won one award, in a tie with Natasa Theodoridou from five nominations.

Year	Nominee / work	Award	Result
2002	Katy Garbi	Female Singer of the Year	Nominated
2002	Katy Garbi	Best Female for Laïko	Nominated
2002	Katy Garbi	Best Female for Modern Laïko	Won
2004	Katy Garbi	Best Female for Modern Laïko	Nominated
2006	Katy Garbi	Best Female for Laïko	Nominated

== Eurovision awards ==
The Eurovision Song Contest is an annual competition held among active member countries of the EBU. The contest, which has been broadcast every year since its début in 1956, is one of the longest-running television programs and most watched in the world. Garbi represented Greece in 1993, finishing in ninth place.

Year	Nominated work	Result	Place	Points
1993	"Ellada, Hora Tou Fotos"	Nominated	9th	64

== MAD Video Music Awards ==
The MAD Video Music Awards are held annually in June by MAD TV since 2004. In its first two years, the awards were televised on ANT1 for non-satellite viewers, but have since moved to Alpha TV. Garbi has performed five times at the awards (2005, 2013, 2015, 2019 and 2022), and presented an award to Anna Vissi in 2004 and Antonis Remos in 2013. Garbi has received 10 nominations, an honorary award in 2019 for her 30 years of discography, and an honorary award for her outstanding contribution to the Greek music industry

Year	Nominee / work	Award	Result
2004	Katy Garbi in Na Pernas	Fashion Icon	Nominated
2006	Spaciba Baby	Best Duet Video Clip	Nominated
2007	Esena Mono Mokka vs Katy Garbi	Best Dance Video Clip	Nominated
2015	Katy Garbi	Best Female Adult	Nominated
2018	Katy Garbi	Best Female Adult	Nominated
2019	Katy Garbi	Best Female Adult	Nominated
2019	Katy Garbi	Artist Recognition Award	Won
2021	Katy Garbi	Best Female Adult	Nominated
2021	Katy Garbi and Antonis Remos in Kivotos	Song of the Year	Nominated
2022	Katy Garbi	Best Female Adult	Nominated
2022	Katy Garbi	Artist Recognition Award	Won
2022	Katy Garbi and Dionysis Schinas in Atofio Hrisafi	Song of the Year	Nominated

== Pop Corn Music Awards ==
The Greek Pop Corn Music Awards are a defunct awards ceremony that were the first official Greek music awards show from 1992-2001 and were organized by the Greek magazine Pop Corn. The Arion Music Awards became the new national music awards ceremony in 2001 after the Pop Corns were discontinued. Garbi has received 12 awards from over 33 nominations.

Year	Nominee / work	Award	Result
1993	Tou Feggariou Anapnoes	Best LP	Nominated
1994	"Nai Yparho Ego"	Song of the Year	Nominated
1994	Katy Garbi	Female Artist of the Year	Nominated
1995	Atofio Hrysafi	Album of the Year	Won
1995	"Ksypoliti Horevo"	Best Laiko Dance Track	Won
1995	"Zisame"	Best Duet	Nominated
1995	"Mi Me Sigkrineis"	Best Lyrics	Nominated
1996	Arhizo Polemo	Album of the Year	Won
1996	"Perasmena Ksehasmena"	Best Laiko Dance Song	Won
1996	"Arhizo Polemo"	Best Lyrics	Won
1996	"Tha Melagholiso"	Best Composition	Won
1996	Katy Garbi	Female Artist of the Year	Nominated
1997	Katy Garbi	Female Artist of the Year	Nominated
1998	Evaisthisies	Album of the Year	Won
1998	"Evaisthisies"	Song of the Year	Won
1998	"Evaisthisies"	Radio Sfera 102.1 Song of the Year	Won
1998	"Apozimiosi"	Best Female Interpretation	Nominated
1998	Katy Garbi	Best Female Stage Performance	Nominated
1998	Katy Garbi	Female Artist of the Year	Nominated
1999	"Agkires"	Best Laiko Dance Song	Nominated
1999	Doro Theou	Best Artwork	Won
1999	Doro Theou	Album of the Year	Nominated
1999	"Pos Fovamai Na Sou Po"	Best Female Interpretation	Nominated
1999	"Doro Theou"	Best Lyrics	Nominated
1999	Katy Garbi	Best Female Stage Performance	Nominated
1999	Katy Garbi	Female Artist of the Year	Nominated
2000	"Epitelous"	Best Duet/Collaboration	Won
2000	To Kati	Album of the Year	Nominated
2000	"To Kati"	Song of the Year	Nominated
2000	"To Kati"	Best Dance Track	Won
2000	"To Lathos"	Best Female Interpretation	Nominated
2000	Katy Garbi	Best Female Stage Performance	Nominated
2000	Katy Garbi	Female Artist of the Year	Nominated

== Super Music Awards ==
The Super Music Awards are the current music awards of Cyprus, held annually in June by Super FM Radio (Cyprus) since 2016. Garbi has received seven nominations, four in recognition of the album Spase Tous Deiktes.

Year	Nominee/Work	Award	Result
2017	Katy Garbi	Best Female (Laiko)	Nominated
2018	Katy Garbi	Best Female (Laiko)	Nominated
2018	Spase Tous Deiktes	Album of the Year	Nominated
2018	Katy Garbi/Vasilis Karras - Oute Leksi	Best Duet/Collaboration	Nominated
2019	Katy Garbi	Best Female (Adult)	Nominated
2021	Katy Garbi	Best Female (Adult)	Nominated
2021	Katy Garbi/Dionisis Shinas - Atofio Hrisafi	Single of the Year	Nominated

== Other honours ==
- On 14 March 2010, Alpha TV ranked Garbi the eighth top-certified Greek female artist by IFPI Greece during the phonographic era (since 1960).
- On 9 May 1997, Garbi became the first Greek female artist to perform at Radio City Music Hall in New York City.
