= 30 Hronia Katy Garbi (Live Katrakio 2019) =

30 Hronia Katy Garbi (Live Katrakio 2019) 30 Χρόνια Καίτη Γαρμπή (Live Κατράκειο 2019)
- Digital release artwork

Live album by Katy Garbi
- Released: 13 April 2020
- Recorded: 19 September 2019
- Venues: Katrakio Theater, Nikaia
- Genres: Pop, Modern Laika, Dance
- Length: 2:50:00
- Language: Greek
- Labels: Panik Records; Panik Platinum
- Director: Giorgos Gkavalos
- Producer: Leonidas Tzitzos

Katy Garbi chronology
Spase Tous Deiktes (2017)	30 Hronia Katy Garbi (Live Katrakio 2019); 30 Χρόνια Καίτη Γαρμπή (Live Κατράκειο 2019) (2020)

30 Hronia Katy Garbi (Live Katrakio 2019) (trans. 30 Χρόνια Καίτη Γαρμπή [Live Κατράκειο 2019]; 30 Years Katy Garbi [Live Katrakio 2019]) is a live album by Greek singer Katy Garbi recorded in 2019 and released in 2020 by Panik Records.

The album is Garbi's second live album; a three-disc compilation of songs performed during a special concert held at the Katrakio Theater in Nikaia in honour of Garbi's 30 years of discography. The album features performances by Eleni Foureira, Giorgos Papadopoulos, Antonis Remos, Giorgos Sabanis, Dimitris Schinas, Dionisis Schinas and Kostas Tournas.

== Release, Promotion, Marketing ==
The album was first released through digital platforms on 13 April 2020 by Panik Platinum and licensed by Heart Events. Due to the COVID-19 pandemic, Panik Platinum chose to delay the physical release of the live CD until 3 August 2020. The physical version of the album contained all seventy-two tracks from the digital release of the concert into three CDs, as well as three hours of concert footage on DVD. The package also contained 80-pages worth of artwork from Garbi's 30 years of discography.

=== Broadcast ===
The concert held on 16 September 2019 was filmed by Garbi's longtime video collaborator, Giorgos Gkavalos. An edited cut of the concert was broadcast on Greek free-to-air channel Alpha TV on 18 April 2020 as part of Easter Sunday line-up. The broadcast version of the concert is limited to 103 minutes, featuring only one song performed with each guest singer and omitting 67 minutes of the concert that appear on the album recording.

The Alpha TV broadcast gained 8.2 per cent of viewership for the late night time-slot, ranking second to the Mega Channel broadcast of Antonis Remos' Live Experience Tour, also featuring Garbi as a guest performer, which acquired 13.2 per cent of overall viewership.

== Track listing ==
Disc 1
No.	Title	Lyrics	Music	Original album	Length
1.	"Intro (Prova)"				2:09
2.	"Kainourgia Ego"	GML; Thirio	Nikos Antipas	Kainourgia Ego	2:23
3.	"Tha Melagholiso"	Phoebus	Phoebus	Arhizo Polemo	2:33
4.	"Ilios De Vgaini An De Peis Kalimera"	Phoebus	Phoebus	Non-album	3:21
5.	"Hamena"	Phoebus	Phoebus	Arhizo Polemo	3:10
6.	"Na Pernas"	Smaroula Maragkoudaki	Spiros Georgiou	Emmones Idees	1:31
7.	"Nai, Iparho Ego"	Phoebus	Phoebus	Os Ton Paradeiso	1:39
8.	"O Kafes"	Giannis Doxas	Orestis Plakidis	Os Ton Paradeiso	1:37
9.	"Ierosilia"	Phoebus	Phoebus	Evaisthisies	3:04
10.	"Triferotita"	Phoebus	Phoebus	Evaisthisies	2:01
11.	"O Ilios Pou Egine Vrohi"	Phoebus	Phoebus	Atofio Hrisafi	1:51
12.	"Agio Kalokairi"	Giannis Doxas	Phoebus	Arhizo Polemo	1:48
13.	"Os Ton Paradeiso"	Phoebus	Phoebus	Os Ton Paradeiso	2:17
14.	"Epitelous" (ft. Giorgos Papadopoulos)	Phoebus	Phoebus	To Kati	3:50
15.	"Oli Mou I Stenahoria" (ft. Giorgos Papadopoulos)	Phoebus	Phoebus	To Kati	3:15
16.	"Se Poliorkia [Pes Pes] / Spas' Ta" (ft. Giorgos Papadopoulos)	Phoebus	Phoebus	Atofio Hrisafi	3:03
17.	"Apla Ta Pragmata"	Tasos Vougiatzis	Solon Apostolakis	Apla Ta Pragmata	1:18
18.	"Akouse, Agori Mou"	Vaggelis Konstantinidis	Christos Dantis	Eho Sta Matia Ourano	2:11
19.	"To Tzini"	Giannis Nikolaou	Giannis Nikolaou	Gialia Karfia	1:28
20.	"Tou Feggariou Anapnoes"	Tasoula Thomaidou	Spiros Pazios	Tou Feggariou Anapnoes	0:52
21.	"Den Einai I Proti Fora"	Tasoula Thomaidou	Spiros Pazios	Tou Feggariou Anapnoes	2:13
22.	"Fantasmataki"	Nikos Doulamis	Nikos Doulamis	Gialia Karfia	1:09
23.	"Sto Sain Trope"	Takis Karnatsos	Cenci & Faiella	Ta Deka Dekaria Vol.1	2:38
24.	"Anemodarmena Ipsi" (ft. Giorgos Sabanis)	Eleni Giannatsoulia	Giorgos Sabanis	Perierges Meres	4:32
25.	"Arhizo Polemo" (ft. Giorgos Sabanis)	Giannis Doxas	Phoebus	Arhizo Polemo	2:55

Disc 2
No.	Title	Lyrics	Music	Original album	Length
1.	"Evaisthisies"	Phoebus	Phoebus	Evaisthisies	1:51
2.	"Alitaki Mou"	Phoebus	Phoebus	To Kati	1:37
3.	"Pos Allazei O Kairos"	Pegasus	Pegasus	Pos Allazei O Kairos	1:59
4.	"Viastika"	Antonis Pappas	Nikos Terzis	Apla Ta Pragmata	1:30
5.	"Apozimiosi"	Phoebus	Phoebus	Evaisthisies	2:29
6.	"Esena Mono"	Nikos Gritsis	Dimitris Kontopoulos	Emmones Idees	4:14
7.	"To Lathos Mou" (ft. Dimitris Schinas)	Phoebus	Phoebus	To Kati	4:14
8.	"Omorfainis Tin Zoi Mou" (performed by Dionisis Shoinas and Dimitris Schinas)	Phoebus	Phoebus	Non-album	2:17
9.	"Eimai Akoma Paidi" (performed by Dionisis Schinas and Dimitris Schinas)	Vasilis Dimas	Vasilis Dimas		2:17
10.	"Apsiha Pragmata" (performed by Dionysis Schinas)	Smaroula Maragoudaki	Spiros Georgiou	Emmones Idees	3:22
11.	"Zisame" (ft. Dionysis Shoinas)	Phoebus	Phoebus	Gia Sena Kai Gia Mena	3:27
12.	"Entalma Sillipseos"	Nikos Vaxevanelis	Andreas Mexas	Endalma Silepseos	1:15
13.	"Atofio Hrisafi"	Phoebus	Phoebus	Atofio Hrisafi	2:00
14.	"Xipoliti Horevo"	Kostas Tournas	Kostas Tournas	Atofio Hrisafi	2:19
15.	"Mi Me Sigkrineis"	Kostas Tournas	Kostas Tournas	Atofio Hrisafi	3:12
16.	"Stigmes" (ft. Kostas Tournas)	Kostas Tournas	Kostas Tournas	Apla Ta Pragmata	4:05
17.	"Oti Oneirevomaste Ginetai" (ft. Kostas Tournas)	Kostas Tournas	Kostas Tournas	Atofio Hrisafi	2:34
18.	"Eho Sta Matia Ourano"	Vasilis Giannopoulos	Christos Dantis	Eho Sta Matia Ourano	2:06

Disc 3
No.	Title	Lyrics	Music	Original album	Length
1.	"Doro Theou"	Gioula Georgiou	Giorgos Theofanous	Doro Theou	1:27
2.	"Fougaro"	Phoebus	Phoebus	Arhizo Polemo	1:21
3.	"Apo Do Kai Pio Pera"	Giannis Doxas	Phoebus	Arhizo Polemo	1:57
4.	"Ellada, Hora Tou Fotos"	Dimosthenis Stringlis	Dimosthenis Stringlis	Os Ton Paradeiso	2:35
5.	"To Kati" (ft. Eleni Foureira)	Phoebus	Phoebus	To Kati	4:53
6.	"Ti Theloune Ta Matia Sou"	Giannis Kalpouzos	Spiros Kontakis	Apla Ta Pragmata	2:34
7.	"Kaneis San Esena"	Aggeliki Makrinioti	Iordanis Pavlou	Spase Tous Deiktes	0:52
8.	"M' Eheis Arrostisei"	Panos Falaras	Kostas Miliotakis	Mia Kardia	0:29
9.	"Mia Kardia Tin Eho"	Tasos Vougiatzis	Christos Dantis	Mia Kardia	0:36
10.	"Nterti"	Evi Droutsa	Şehrazat	Os Ton Paradeiso	1:41
11.	"Akouo Tin Kardoula Sou"	Phoebus	Phoebus	Os Ton Paradeiso	1:43
12.	"Mia Fora Ki Enan Kairo"	Phoebus	Phoebus	Arhizo Polemo	2:00
13.	"Asimfonia Haraktiron" (ft. Antonis Remos)	Phoebus	Phoebus	Evaisthisies	4:43
14.	"Pes To M' Ena Fili" (performed by Antonis Remos)	Natalia Germanou	Nikos Terzis	Tou Feggariou Anapnoes	2:32
15.	"Kivotos" (performed by Antonis Remos)	Phoebus	Phoebus	Evaisthisies	3:21
16.	"I Patrida Mou" (ft. Antonis Remos)	Phoebus	Phoebus	Evaisthisies	3:20
17.	"Kormia Hamena"	Phoebus	Phoebus	Non-album	3:34
18.	"Aspro I Mavro"	Eleni Giannatsoulia	Salah El Sharnobi	Ti Theloune Ta Matia Sou	1:50
19.	"Kolasi"	Phoebus	Phoebus	Atofio Hrisafi	0:45
20.	"Thelo Apopse Na Horepso"	Efstathia	Dimitris Zbekos	Apla Ta Pragmata	1:09
21.	"Mou Leipeis"	Phoebus	Phoebus	Evaisthisies	1:21
22.	"Perasmena Xehasmena"	Giannis Doxas	Charis Andreadis	Arhizo Polemo	3:23
23.	"Kalitera Oi Dio Mas"	Natalia Germanou	Nikos Karvelas	Kravgi	1:25
24.	"Katapliktiko"	Tasos Vougiatzis	Ilias Pantazopoulos	Galazio Kai Lefko + Remixes	1:50
25.	"Agkires"	Eleni Giannatsoulia	Savvas Angin	Doro Theou	1:50
26.	"Skorpia" (ft. Giorgos Sabanis)	Nikos Gritsis	Dimitris Kontopoulos	Spase Tous Deiktes	3:40
27.	"Spase Tous Deiktes Tou Rologiou"	Eleni Giannatsoulia	Giorgos Sabanis	Spase Tous Deiktes	2:42
28.	"Otan Se Hreiazomai"	Antonis Pappas	Nikos Terzis	Apla Ta Pragmata	2:35
29.	"Outro (Kivotos)"	Phoebus	Phoebus	Evaisthisies	2:43

== Charts ==
The album debuted at number 1 on Greece's i-tunes charts on its digital release. On its physical release, the album debuted at number 6 on the Greek combined album charts, peaking at number 5, spending a total of 8 weeks on the chart.

Chart	Peak position	Certification
Greek Albums Chart (IFPI Greece)	5	Platinum

== Credits ==
=== Personnel ===
- Sotiris Agrafiotis – keyboards
- Chrisa Bandeli – backing vocals
- Christos Bousdoukos – violin
- Kostas Lainas – keyboards
- Tasos Liberis – percussion
- Zacharias Maragkos – electric guitar
- Andreas Mouzakis – drums
- Stavros Papagiannakopoulos – bouzouki, cümbüş
- Giorgos Retikas – acoustic guitar
- Teddy Sekeriadis – bass
- Leonidas Tzitzos – orchestration, programming, keyboards

=== Production ===
- Despina Alchazidou – make up
- Vasilis Bouloubasis – grooming
- Panagiotis Brakoulias (Track Factory Recording studio) – sound engineer, mix, editing, mastering
- Alexis Chaimalas – lighting technician
- Katy Garbi – executive producer
- Konstantinos Georgantas – art direction
- Giorgos Gkavalos (View studio) – director
- Meletis Kariotis – audio design, lighting design
- Dionisis Kolpodinos – styling
- Vasilis Koulogeorgiou – audio technician
- Antonis Moraitis – audio technician
- Orestis Nikolaidis – photographer
- Christos Papanikolaou – styling
- Dimitris Retouniotis – audio technician
- Dionisis Schinas – executive producer

== Release history ==
Release formats for "30 Hronia Katy Garbi (Live Katrakio 2019)"
Region	Date	Format	Label	Ref.
Various	April 13, 2020	Digital download; streaming	Panik Platinum	
Various	August 3, 2020	DVD+CD	Panik Platinum	
