= Prova (disambiguation) =

Prova may refer to:

- Prova, a programming language
- Prova (album), an album by Katy Garbi
- Sadia Jahan Prova, a Bangladeshi model and television actress

== See also ==
- Prove (disambiguation)
