= The Video Collection (Katy Garbi video) =

Video by Katy Garbi
- Released: 3 June 2002
- Genre: Pop, Modern Laika, Dance
- Length: 1:20:00
- Language: Greek
- Label: Sony Music Greece; Columbia
- Producer: Giannis Doulamis

Katy Garbi chronology
Apla Ta Pragmata (2001)	The Video Collection (2002)	Mia Kardia (2002)

The Video Collection is a music video DVD compilation by Greek singer Katy Garbi, released on 3 June 2002 by Sony Music Greece. The collection includes 35 music videos from Katy's albums from Gialia Karfia, 1990 until Apla Ta Pragmata, 2001 and also features an artist biography, a discography listing and exclusive photos.

== Track list ==
1. Viastika (Nikos Terzis / Antonis Pappas)
2. Thelo Apopse Na Horepso (Dimitris Zbekos / Efstathia)
3. Apla Ta Pragmata (Solon Apostolakis / Tasos Vougiatzis)
4. Ti Theloune Ta Matia Sou (Spiros Kontakis / Giannis Kalpouzos)
5. Kalitera Oi Dio Mas - Part A (ft. Anna Vissi) (Nikos Karvelas / Natalia Germanou)
6. Kalitera Oi Dio Mas - Part B (ft. Anna Vissi) (Nikos Karvelas / Natalia Germanou)
7. To Kati (Phoebus)
8. Epitelous (ft. Natassa Theodoridou) (Phoebus)
9. To Lathos Mou (Phoebus)
10. Doro Theou (Giorgos Theofanous / Gioula Georgiou)
11. Aponomi Dikaiosinis (Giorgos Theofanous / Gioula Georgiou)
12. Evaisthisies (Phoebus)
13. Ierosilia (Phoebus)
14. Mou Leipeis (Phoebus)
15. Apozimiosi (Phoebus)
16. Kivotos (Phoebus)
17. I Patrida Mou (ft. Antonis Vardis) (Phoebus)
18. Asimfonia Haraktiron (ft. Antonis Remos) (Phoebus)
19. Triferotita (Phoebus)
20. Tha Melagholiso (Phoebus)
21. Hamena (Phoebus)
22. Perasmena Xehasmena (Charis Andreadis / Giannis Doxas)
23. Mia Fora Ki Enan Kairo (Phoebus)
24. Apo Do Kai Pio Pera (Phoebus / Giannis Doxas)
25. Xipoliti Horevo (Kostas Tournas)
26. Atofio Hrisafi (Phoebus)
27. Mi Me Sigkrineis (Kostas Tournas)
28. Kolasi (Phoebus)
29. Zisame (ft. Dionisis Schinas) (Phoebus)
30. Nai, Iparho Ego (Phoebus)
31. Os Ton Paradeiso (Phoebus)
32. Pes To M' Ena Fili (Nikos Terzis / Natalia Germanou)
33. Entalma Sillipseos (Andreas Mexas / Nikos Vaxevanelis)
34. Fantasmataki (Nikos Doulamis)
35. Touli Gia Ton Christouli (ft. Konstantinos Paliatsaras)

== Credits ==
=== Directors ===
- Dimitris Galanis (tracks: 30)
- Giorgos Gkavalos (tracks: 3, 5, 6, 9, 10, 11, 12, 13, 23, 35)
- Vaggelis Kalaitzis (tracks: 14, 15, 16, 18, 19, 24)
- Kostas Kapetanidis (tracks: 1, 2, 4, 7, 8, 29)
- Vasilis Konstantoulas (tracks: 33)
- Giorgos Louizos (tracks: 28)
- Nikos Patrelakis (tracks: 30)
- Giorgos Sofoulis (tracks: 20, 26, 31, 32)
- Dimitris Sotas (tracks: 17, 34)
- Nikos Soulis (tracks: 25)

** In tracks 21, 22, 27 are not lined the directors on video clips.

Credits adapted from Katy's albums and video clips.

== Special features ==
- Biography
- Discography - Full track listings
- Photo gallery
