= Hit Mix =

Hit Mix may refer to:

- Hit Mix (album), a 1988 album by Prudence Liew
- "Hit Mix" (song), a 2002 song by Katy Garbi
- Hits Mix, 2003 album by Celia Cruz
