= Kalbine Sor =

Kalbine Sor Ask Your Heart

EP by Burak Kut & Katy Garbi
- Released: 17 December 2015.
- Recorded: 2015
- Genres: Contemporary laika, folk, pop
- Length: 23:38
- Languages: Turkish, Greek
- Label: 2645 Records

Katy Garbi chronology
Perierges Meres (2013)	Kalbine Sor (2015)	Spase Tous Deiktes (2017)

Singles from Kalbine Sor
- 1. "Koita S'Agapao" Released: 14 December 2015; 2. "Kalbine Sur" Released: 14 December 2015

Kalbine Sor (Greek: Τη Καρδιά Σου Ρώτα; English: Ask Your Heart) is an EP by Greek recording artist Katy Garbi and Turkish recording artist Burak Kut. The EP was released digitally on 17 December 2015 via Turkish record label 2645 Records.

== Track listing ==
No.	Title	Lyrics	Music	Artist(s)	Length
1.	"Harikalar Diyarı" (Wonderland)	Burak Kut	Thanos Giorgoulas		4:04
2.	"Kalbine Sor" (Ask Your Heart)	Burak Kut	Thanos Giorgoulas	Burak Kut	3:49
3.	"Harikalar Diyarı (Koita S'Agapao Version)" (Wonderland (See, I Love You Version))	Natalia Germanou & Burak Kut	Thanos Giorgoulas	Burak Kut & Katy Garbi	4:05
4.	"Harikalar Diyarı (Ti Kardia Sou Rota Version)" (Wonderland (Ask Your Heart Version))	Natalia Germanou & Burak Kut	Thanos Giorgoulas	Burak Kut & Katy Garbi	3:48
5.	"Koita S'Agapo" (Κοίτα Σ' Αγαπάω; See, I Love You)	Natalia Germanou	Thanos Giorgoulas	Katy Garbi	4:04
6.	"Ti Kardia Sou Rota" (Τη Καρδιά Σου Ρώτα; Ask Your Heart)	Natalia Germanou	Thanos Giorgoulas	Katy Garbi	3:48
Total length:					23:38

== Release history ==
Region	Date	Label	Format	Catalog No.
Turkey	17 December 2015	2645 Records	Digital download	—
