= Burak Kut =

Turkish pop singer and songwriter (born 1973)

- Born: 27 August 1973 (age 52)
- Origin: Istanbul, Turkey
- Genres: Pop
- Occupations: Singer, songwriter
- Instruments: Piano, Keyboard, Western concert flute, Vocals
- Years active: 1994–present
- Labels: Peker Müzik, BBK, Mert Müzik, Universal Records, Dogan Music Company (DMC), Pasaj Muzik, Avrupa Muzik

Burak Kut (born 27 August 1973) is a Turkish pop singer and songwriter.

== Biography ==
As a child, Burak attended Müziğe Çapa and played in the orchestra for many years. He continued playing in an orchestra until he entered high school at İstanbul Anadolu Güzel Sanatlar Lisesi, where he began to play flute and piano. Burak then attended Kabataş Erkek Lisesi, he won the competition three years running.

He released his first album Benimle Oynama/Çılgınım with Peker Music. His rise to fame rocketed, performing over 300 concerts soon after the album was released. He also won the European MTV "Local Hero Award" around this time. Burak did most of the work on his second album Nereden Geldim, Nerelere Gideceğim. His song Yaşandı Bitti gained airplay in New York City, and his popularity now stretched out to the United States.

While working on an album, Burak did a duet with Sarah Brightman accompanied by an orchestra ensemble of 100 musicians. He also sang duets with Greek singer Sakis Rouvas in Cyprus at the Border Line (Yeşil Hat) to help the two nations come together. He self-produced his third album Küçük Prens. He also later signed on to Universal Records and they helped him release a fourth self-titled album in 2000. After seven years, he released "Komple", a cover of Daddy Yankee's Rompe with lyrics written by Sezen Aksu. Burak Kut is releasing his new album called "İlaç" on 11 December 2009, album with 12 songs.

Burak Kut released his first Turkish EP, Sevginin Her Hali in 2013. The record just contains 3 songs, all written by Burak himself.

In 2015 Burak, released his first 1 track only song – written by himself – "Olduğu Kadar Olmadı Kadar". He also announced in a press presentation in October 2015, he's releasing a featuring album with Greece singer Katy Garbi, expected to release somewhere in December 2015.

== Discography ==
=== Albums ===
- 1994 – Benimle Oynama – Çılgınım (Peker Müzik)
- 1995 – Nereden Geldim Nerelere Gideceğim (Peker Müzik)
- 1997 – Küçük Prens (BBK/Mert Müzik Yapım)
- 2000 – Burak Kut (Universal/Avrupa Müzik)
- 2007 – Komple (Doğan Music Company)
- 2009 – İlaç (Doğan Music Company)

=== Singles / maxi singles ===
- 1997 – Derdim Var (Ascot) feat. David Morales
- 2013 – Sevginin Her Hali (Pasaj Müzik)
- 2015 – Olduğu Kadar Olmadı Kader (Avrupa Müzik)
- 2015 – Kalbine Sor (İYİ MÜZİK/Katy Garbi Productions/Panic Records) (with Katy Garbi)
- 2018 – Hoppa
- 2022 – Kafam Leyla

== Filmography ==
=== Programs ===
- 2007 – Dilimin Ucunda – Presenter – ATV
- 2009 – Hadi Bakalım – Presenter – TRT Müzik
- 2011 – Avrasya Yıldızı – Judge – TRT Avaz
- 2011–2012 – Biz de Varız – Presenter – TRT Avaz
- 2015 – En Sevdiğim 3 Şarkı – Judge – ATV
- 2016 – O Ses Çocuklar – Judge – TV8

=== Theater ===
- 2010 – Hisseli Harikalar Kumpanyası Broadway
- 2016 – Küçük Prens (directed by Alev Baymur)

=== TV series ===
- 1993 – Üçüzler (Kemal's son)
- 1994 – Kurtuluş (episode 4 extra)
- 2007 – Aşk Kapıyı Çalınca (Emre Zeybek)
- 2009 – Altın Kızlar (Guest appearance)
- 2011 – Nuri (Umut)
- 2014 – Güldür Güldür (Himself)
- 2014 – Ankara'nın Dikmen'i (Latif)
- 2014 – Arkadaşım Hoşgeldin (Himself)
- 2015 – [[Günebakan] (movied)|Günebakan]] (Himself)
- 2015 – Buyur Burdan Bak (Himself)
- 2015 – Adı Mutluluk (Himself)
- 2018–2020 Tozkoparan (Cihan)

=== Cinema ===
- 2002 – O Şimdi Asker

== See also ==
- List of Turkish pop music performers
- Turkish pop music
