= Christougenna Me Tin Katy =

Christougenna Me Tin Katy Χριστούγεννα Με Την Καίτη

Studio album by Katy Garbi
- Released: November 16, 1998
- Studio: Sierra studio
- Genre: Christmas
- Length: 35:38 (original edition)
- Language: Greek
- Labels: Sony Music Greece; Columbia
- Producer: Giannis Doulamis

Katy Garbi chronology
Evaisthisies (1997)	Christougenna Me Tin Katy; Χριστούγεννα Με Την Καίτη (1998)	Doro Theou (1999)

Singles from Christougenna Me Tin Katy
- 1. "Touli Gia Ton Christouli" Released: November 1998; 2. "O Ai Vasilis Pali Tha 'Rthei" Released: December 1998; 3. "O Chakim Apo Tin Afriki" Released: December 1998; 4. "Christougenna" Released: December 1998; 5. "Christos Gennatai" Released: December 1998; 6. "Ora Christougennon" Released: November 1998; 7. "Rudolph, To Elafaki" Released: December 1998; 8. "To Nanourisma Tis Marias" Released: December 1998; 9. "Ton Christougennon Kampanes" Released: December 1998; 10. "O Cheimonas O Varis" Released: December 1998

Singles from Christougenna Me Tin Katy (2021 version)
- 1. "Chronia Polla" Released: 15 December 2021

Alternative cover
- 2021 Reissue cover

Christougenna Me Tin Katy (Greek: Χριστούγεννα Με Την Καίτη; English: Christmas With Katy) is the ninth studio album by Greek artist, Katy Garbi. It was released on 16 November 1998 by Sony Music Greece and certified gold in four Christmas seasons, but until today gained platinum certification, selling over 50,000 units, and it is the only Greek Christmas album that has achieved gold and platinum certification. The original album contains eleven Greek versions of well-known international Christmas songs, accompanied by Spiros Labrou's children choir and internationally known tenor, Konstantinos Paliatsaras on the song "Touli Gia Ton Christouli". The choir had already collaborated with Katy in the song "Ftou Xeleftheria" from the album Arhizo Polemo (1996). Well-known lyricist, Eleni Giannatsoulia provided the Greek lyrics for all the songs on the album.

== Background ==
Spiros Labrou, a well-known children's choir leader, introduced Katy to many foreign Christmas songs which were until then unknown to her. Labrou and Doulamis selected the songs that were to be translated for the album. Travelling to Australia as part of her world tour in 1998, Katy listened to the original version of the songs selected by her producer and Labrou. While found the songs to be difficult, she "fell in-love" with various Christmas songs, particularly those by Frank Sinatra such as Adeste Fideles which became the main single of the album.

== Release ==
It was released in 1998 in Greece and Cyprus by Columbia Records, sublabel of Sony Music Greece. The original album, with Antonis Glikos at art direction and Tasos Vrettos at principal photography with red cover, where Katy holding a bunch of white Christmas lights. The album was reissued later with an alternate artwork, featuring Katy in a snow globe on a white background.

In 2007, Sony BMG Greece granted a licensed re-release to Athens-based Espresso newspaper for their Chrisi Diskothiki; the re-release contained the same tracks as the original. The photo used for the 2007 re-release was taken from the album Apla Ta Pragmata (2001).

In 2021, Panik Platinum, sublabel of Panik Records Greece, had acquired the rights to Sony Music and re-released the album with a new song "Chronia Polla", adapted by Carol Of The Bells. The cover of the 12-track release contains a Nutcracker cartoon version of Katy, which stems from Katy's line of Garbi-themed smartphone pictograms titled "Kaitoji".

== Track listing ==
All lyrics are written by Eleni Giannatsoulia.

Original edition
No.	Title	Length
1.	"Touli Gia Ton Christouli (Adeste Fideles)" (Τούλι Για Τον Χριστούλη)	3:45
2.	"O Ai Vasilis Pali Tha 'Rthei (Santa Claus Is Coming To Town)" (Ο Αη Βασίλης Πάλι Θα 'Ρθει)	3:23
3.	"O Chakim Apo Tin Afriki (Jolly Old Saint Nicholas)" (Ο Χακίμ Από Την Αφρική)	1:34
4.	"Christougenna (Have Yourself A Merry Little Christmas)" (Χριστούγεννα)	3:44
5.	"Christos Gennatai (Sleigh Ride)" (Χριστός Γεννάται)	2:25
6.	"Ora Christougennon (I'll Be Home for Christmas)" (Ώρα Χριστουγέννων)	3:06
7.	"Rudolph, To Elafaki (Rudolph the Red-Nosed Reindeer)" (Ρούντολφ, Το Ελαφάκι)	2:41
8.	"To Nanourisma Tis Marias (White Christmas)" (Το Νανούρισμα Της Μαρίας)	3:55
9.	"Ton Christougennon Kampanes (Silver Bells)" (Των Χριστουγέννων Καμπάνες)	3:11
10.	"O Cheimonas O Varis (White Wonderland)" (Ο Χειμώνας Ο Βαρύς)	4:51
11.	"Christougenna Xana (Ding Dong Merrily On High)" (Χριστούγεννα Ξανά)	3:03
Total length:		35:38

2021 version
No.	Title	Length
1.	"Chronia Polla (Carol Of The Bells)" (Χρόνια Πολλά)	2:29
Total length:		37:51

== Singles ==
"Touli Gia Ton Christouli"

"Touli Gia Ton Christouli" was the lead single alongside the release of the album in November 1998 and is the most successful album's song. The single was accompanied by a music video which featured Katy alongside internationally known tenor, Konstantinos Paliatsaras and Spiros Labrou's children choir on a snow-filled mountain. Directed by Giorgos Gkavalos and his production company View Studio, the music video was filmed on the Hymettus in Athens, featuring artificial snow created by snow machines.

"Mega Christmas Special"

A television special dedicated to Christougenna Me Tin Katy produced and directed by Giorgos Gkavalos and View Studio, premiered on Mega Channel. The special features the music video for "Touli Gia Ton Christouli" and nine full-length video clips of Katy singing to the remaining songs from the album, except the song "Christougenna Xana". The video clips were filmed in various locations around Athens, including a busy street in Syntagma Square around the city's large Christmas tree and in a snow-covered field. The transition between songs was filled by a child giving a Christmas wish. While "Touli Gia Ton Christouli" is predominantly screened as a stand-alone clip on television music channels, the remaining clips are only screened as part of a complete television special.

== Credits ==
Credits adapted from liner notes.

Personnel

- Maria Barbadimou – children choir
- Tzortzina Broutzi – children choir
- Maria Daphnomili – children choir
- Michalis Diakogiorgis – percussion
- Popi Drosou – children choir
- Sofia Favrou – children choir
- Elena Fragkouli – children choir
- Vasilis Gkinos – music adaption, orchestration, programming, keyboards
- Stelios Goulielmos – backing vocals
- Antonis Gounaris – guitars
- Anna Ioannidou – backing vocals
- Ioanna Kallioupi – children choir
- Anna Kappa – children choir
- Kelly Karamesini – children choir
- Sofia Kardatou – children choir
- Efi Kefala – children choir
- Kostas Kefalas – children choir
- Maria Kostala – children choir
- Giorgos Kostoglou – bass
- Annalia Kouloktsi – children choir
- Antonis Koulouris – drums
- Elena Labrou – children choir
- Sofia Labrou – children choir
- Magda Makri – children choir
- Konstantinos Paliatsaras – vocals (track 1)
- Thimios Papadopoulos – flute
- Aggeliki Papoutsi – children choir
- Melina Pasari – children choir
- Fotini Radeou – children choir
- Giouli Sontaki – children choir
- Eleni Spetsioti – children choir
- Natasa Varela – children choir
- Ioanna Zervolea – children choir

Production

- Giannis Doulamis – production manager
- Al Giga – styling
- Antonis Glikos – art direction
- Giannis Ioannidis (Digital Press Hellas) – mastering
- Iakovos Kalaitzakis – make up
- Michalis Kloukinas – editing
- Vaggelis Lappas (Sierra studio) – sound engineer
- Panagiotis Petronikolos (Sierra studio) – sound engineer, mix engineer
- Petros Siakavellas (Digital Press Hellas) – mastering
- Katerina Sideridou – cover processing
- Stefanos Vasilakis – hair styling
- Tasos Vrettos – photographer

== Charts ==
Christougenna Me Tin Katy debuted at number 4 on IFPI Greek Album Charts spending 10 weeks on the charts over the Christmas holiday season into 1998. The album re-entered the IFPI Greek Album Charts multiple times over consecutive Christmas seasons between 1999 and 2002, and reaching number 5 in 2019. The album gained gold status in December 2002 for the shipment of 30,000 units, making it the only Greek Christmas album to be certified gold. The 2021 re-release of the album debuted at number 5 on the 'IFPI Top 75 Combined Album Charts'.

Original release

Chart (1998–2002)	Position
Top 50 Greek Albums	4

2013 reissue

Chart (2019)	Position
Top 75 Albums Combined	5

2021 reissue

Chart (2021)	Peak position
Top 75 Albums Combined	5

== Release history ==
Release history for Christougenna Me Tin Katy
Country	Date	Label	Format	Catalogue number	Ref.
Greece	12 November 1998	Columbia	LP, CD	COL 4929942	
Cyprus	12 November 1998	Columbia	LP, CD	COL 4929942	
Greece	14 November 2007	Sony BMG GreeceEspresso	CD (Promotional covermount edition in Espresso newspaper)	B12782	
Worldwide reissue	20 November 2013	Feelgood Records Sony Music Greece	CD, Digital download	888430290020	
Worldwide reissue	20 November 2020	Panik Records; Under licence from Sony Music	CD, Digital download	194398509921	
Worldwide reissue	21 December 2021	Panik Records; Under licence from Sony Music	CD, Digital download (2021 version)	19439988382	
