= Hit Mix (song) =

Single by Katy Garbi
- Released: July 2002
- Genre: Pop, modern laika, dance
- Length: 125 min
- Label: Sony Music Greece/Columbia

Katy Garbi singles chronology
"Remix Plus" (2002)	"Hit Mix" (2002)	"Mia Kardia" (2002)

"Hit Mix" is a single by Greek singer Katy Garbi. It was released in 2002 by Sony Music Greece. It is a 1-track mix of 13 greatest hits from Katy Garbi.

== Track listing ==
1 track includes samples of:

1. "Thelo Apopse Na Horepso" (Tonight I Want to Dance)
2. "Perasmena Ksehasmena" (Forgotten Past)
3. "Mou Lipeis" (I Miss You)
4. "Kolasi" (Hell)
5. "Pes To M'Ena Fili" (Say It with a Kiss)
6. "Ksipoliti Horevo" (Kante Akri) (Dancing Bare-foot (Move Aside))
7. "Mia Fora Kai Ena Kairo" (Once Upon a Time)
8. "Nai Yparho Ego" (Yes I Exist)
9. "Se Poliorkia" (Pes Pes) (You're a Stalemate (Say It, Say It))
10. "Mi Me Sigrineis" (Do Not Compare Me)
11. "Hamena" (Lost)
12. "Viastika" (Hurry)

== Charts ==
The single debuted at number 20 on the Greece Top 20 chart and peaked at number 7 in its third week. The single remained in the chart for 5 weeks total. The single charted on the singles chart as it was a 1-track mix of a number of greatests hits.

Chart	Peak position
Greece Top 20	7
