= Konstantinos Paliatsaras =

Greek operatic tenor

Konstantinos Paliatsaras is a Greek operatic tenor.

== Early life and education ==
Born in Athens, Greece, Paliatsaras was attracted to Opera immediately after hearing Maria Callas at the age of 7. He was taught at the National Concervatoire in Athens by Professor Maggie Karatza and at the Royal Academy of Music in London by Professor Constance Shacklock. He also studied with Maestro Andreas Paridis.

== Career ==
Paliatsaras debuted in 1987 at the National Greek Opera, as Alfredo in La Traviata followed by many leading roles, including Macduff (Macbeth), Don Carlos, Don Ottavio in Don Giovanni, Alfred and Prince Orlovsky in die Fledermaus, Rossillon in Die Lustige Witwe (1992, 2000), Die Hexe in Hansel und Gretel (1990), Almaviva in Il Barbiere di Siviglia, Nicias in Thais, Shober in Dreimadelhaus, Jimmy in the Rise and Fall of the City of Mahagonny (1999), Prince Shuisky and the fool in Boris Godunov, the fisherman in Die Kluge, La Vie parisienne, Les contes d'Hoffmann, Ariadne auf Naxos, Salome, Fadinard in Il cappello di paglia di Firenze (2001 and 2003), the latest in Mozart's Die Entfuhrung aus dem Serail (2007).

He was in a partnership with the baroque ensemble Capriccio Stravagante, directed by Skip Sempé, first at the inauguration opening of the Dimitri Mitropoulos hall, part of the Athens Megaron Concert Hall. At the Athens Megaron he also appeared as Apollo in Monteverdi's L'Orfeo with I Solisti Veneti, Carmen with Agnes Baltsa and Mahagonny.

A major landmark in his career was the tour in 30 cities and towns in France as Macheath in Kurt Weill's The Threepenny Opera with opera Eclate culminating in Paris 1990. In France he sang Verdi's Requiem at Angoulêmes, Cognac and Ruffec cathedrals (1990). Paliatsaras also presented Yiannis Markopoulos Liturgy of Orfeus in Vienna (1993), Brussels, Buenos Aires (2005), Ephesus (2004), Limassol, Athens and Ancient Marathon (2006). In the city of Thessaloniki, Paliatsaras sang Paris in Offenbach's La belle Hélène, Don Ottavio in Don Giovanni, and Le Nozze di Figaro. He recorded Monteverdi's Il Combattimento di Tancredi e Clorinda for DHM, BMG with Capriccio Stravagante, a performance that was honored with the Diapason d'Or 1992 reissued in 2004, giving a world tour in Cologne, Monaco, Paris, Normandy (1998), New York, and Seattle, U.S. At the Teatro Olympico, Vicenza, he sang the role of Apollo in Marco da Gagliano's opera La Dafne.

With the composer Vangelis, he recorded the CD El Greco with soprano Montserrat Caballé for Warner Bros. Has also appeared in many films, notably the Greek version of Disney's The Hunchback of Notre Dame singing the role of Clopin in Greek with great success. His most recent appearance in 2009 was as Alfredo in La Traviata at the municipal Theater of Kalamata, Greece in May and a concert in October at the Alexandria Opera House in Egypt. In April 2010, Haendel's Acis and Galatea with the Athens singers Theatro Tehnis Karolos Koun Athens.

== Films ==
- Oh Babylon (1989)
- The Hunchback of Notre Dame (Greek version) (1996)
- The Girl of Mani (1986)
- Zoe (1995)
- Absences (Απουσίες) (1987)

== Discography ==
- ALEXANDER (Sony Music) - 2004
- EL GRECO (Warner) - 1998
- REPRISE (Warner) - 1999
- Il Combattimento di Tancredi e Clorinda (DHM-BMG) - 1993
- Hristougenna Me Tin Katy - 1998
- Under Acropolis lights - Paschalis Tonios (FM Records)
- Foros Timis Ston Greco
- EDMEA TETUA - Mixalis Koumpios (FM Records)

== Repertoire ==
- Claudio Monteverdi
  - Il Combattimento di Tancredi e Clorinda (Testo-Tancredi)
  - L'Orfeo (Apollo)
  - Il Ritorno d'Ulisse in Patria (Ulisse)
  - Schütz: Weihnachtshistorie - Evangelist
  - Die Sieben Worte am Kreuz - Christ
  - Handel: Messiah
  - Il Pastor Fido
  - Acis and Galatea
  - Bach: St Matthew Passion
  - St John Passion
  - Da Gagliano: La Dafne
  - Mozart: Le nozze di figaro
  - Don Giovanni
  - Die Entführung aus dem Serail
  - Donizetti: Lucia di Lammermoor
  - Don Pasquale
  - Rossini: Il barbiere di Siviglia
  - Verdi: La Traviata
  - Macbeth
  - Don Carlos
  - Orietta di Lesbo
  - Requiem
  - Bizet: Carmen
  - Massenet: Thais
  - Offenbach: The Tales of Hoffmann
  - La Vie parisienne
  - La Belle Helene
  - Massenet: Don Quichotte
  - Mussorgsky: Boris Godunov
  - Shostakovich: Lady Macbeth of Mtsensk
  - Tchaikovsky: Eugene Onegin
  - Richard Strauss: Ariadne auf Naxos
  - Salome
  - Orff: Die Kluge
  - Weill: Die Dreigroschenoper
  - Rise and Fall of the City of Mahagonny
  - Humperdinck: Hänsel und Gretel
  - Strauß: Die Fledermaus
  - Lehar: Die lustige Witwe
  - Britten: Peter Grimes
  - Albert Herring
  - Puccini: Madama Butterfly
  - Gianni Schicchi
  - Kalomiris: O Protomastoras
  - Sissilianos: I Fotia
  - Theodorakis: Kostas Karyotakis
  - Nezeritis: Psalmi tou David
  - Lena Platonos and Dimitris Marangopoulos: Asterinos and Chrissomaloussa
  - Sakellaridis: O Vaftistikos
