= Pazl =

Pazl Παζλ

Studio album by Katy Garbi
- Released: 18 February 2011
- Recorded: October 2009–December 2010
- Genre: Contemporary laika
- Length: 38:37
- Language: Greek
- Label: Universal Music Greece
- Producer: Katy Garbi (exec.), Nikos Antipas

Katy Garbi chronology
Kainourgia Ego (2008)	Pazl; Παζλ (2011)	Apo Kardias (2013)

Singles from Pazl
- 1. "Ta Iheia" Released: 2 November 2009; 2. "Oi Skepseis" Released: 30 January 2010; 3. "Geia Sou (Pazl)" Released: 19 February 2011; 4. "Fylla" Released: 1 October 2011

Pazl (Greek: Παζλ, pronounced [puˈzel]; English: Puzzle) is the 17th studio album by Greek recording artist Katy Garbi and 18th album overall. The album was first released on 18 February 2011 via a promotional campaign with the Greek news website 'in.gr'. The campaign included a free limited-time digital download of the entire album and a contest for a dinner with Garbi. On 28 March 2011, the album was commercially released under Garbi's new signing with Universal Music Greece.

The album is entirely composed by Nikos Antipas, extending her collaboration with him which began on her previous album Kainourgia Ego. The majority of the lyrics are credited to the well-known lyricist with the alias GML, with the exception of two songs, "Sti Fotia Rikse Hrysafi" and "Oi Skepseis", written by famous Greek poet Manos Eleftheriou and Vicki Gerothodorou, respectively.

== Background ==
On 3 November 2009, Garbi released the single "Iheia" and announced a planned re-release of the album Kainourgia Ego which would feature three added songs and a remix. However, as the production was underway, the re-release idea was abandoned, and on 9 February 2010, Garbi announced intentions of releasing an all new album instead. Later that year, Garbi left her longtime label Sony Music Greece and signed with Universal Music Greece.

== Release and promotion ==
Pazl was given a limited released on 19 February 2011 as a free digital download under a promotional campaign with Greek news website "in.gr". A contest was also held with the prize being a dinner with Garbi.

Under Garbi's new signing with Universal Music Greece, the album subsequently received a permanent release on 28 March 2011 via conventional physical and digital sales outlets. The release debuted on Greece's Top 75 Combined Albums chart at number eleven, and has since peaked at number 8. Garbi also announced the labels' intention to distribute the CD as a covermount.

== Track listing ==
All lyrics are written by GML except as noted; all music is composed by Nikos Antipas

No.	Title	Lyrics	Length
1.	"Geia Sou (Pazl)" (Γειά Σου; Goodbye (Puzzle))		3:27
2.	"Fylla" (Φύλλα; Leaves)		3:18
3.	"I Katharistires" (Οι Καθαριστήρες; Windscreen wipers)		3:21
4.	"Ola Sta Zitisa" (Όλα Στα Ζήτησα; Everything I've asked of you)		3:29
5.	"Ego" (Εγώ; Me)		3:08
6.	"Psemata" (Ψέματα; Lies)		3:07
7.	"Sinnefa" (Σύννεφα; Clouds)		3:20
8.	"Rombot" (Ρομπότ; Robot)		3:20
9.	"Ta Iheia" (Τα Ηχεία; The speakers)		3:16
10.	"Sti Fotia Rikse Hrysafi" (Στη φωτιά ρίξε χρυσάφι; Throw gold in the fire)	Manos Eleftheriou	3:28
11.	"Oi Skepseis" (Οι Σκέψεις; Thoughts)	Vicki Gerothodorou	5:02
Total length:			38:37

== Singles ==
The following singles were officially released to radio stations. Additional songs such as, "Ego" and "Psemata", despite not having been released as singles, managed to gain radio airplay.

"Ta Iheia"

"Ta Iheia" was the first single off the album, released on 2 November 2009, by Sony Music Greece. In the weeks leading up to the single's release, "Ta Iheia" was slated as the lead single of a planned repackaging of Garbi's previous album Kainourgia Ego, which was to be released in the months following. "Ta Iheia" stands as Garbi's eleventh released track penned by Nikos Antipas, with lyrics by GML. The single was also released digitally, with artwork done by John Mitropoulos. The track is described as a fast tempo balad, almost similar to the latin-like rhythm of a Tango. Following the single's release, it was announced that video director John Mitropoulos, who also directed the music video for "Kainourgia Ego" from Garbi's previous album of the same name, would also be directing the music video for "Ta Iheia", and that the shooting of the video was already underway. The music video never materialised, as Garbi decided upon releasing a new single instead.

The album version is a different recording using elements significant to the theming of the album, such as violin chords. In contrast, the original version released by former label Sony Music Greece featured rock music elements combined with Latin beats and instruments not evident in the album version.

"Oi Skepseis"

"Oi Skepseis" was the second single from the album, released on 30 January 2010. The lyrics are credited to Vicki Gerothodorou who also collaborated with Nikos Antipas on Garbi's previous album. Garbi's label at the time, Sony Music Greece, released the track exclusively to radio station Love Radio on the 15 January 2010, along with additional material that included interviews, web exclusives and live events over the course of a month. The original version released via Love Radio was titled "Oi Skepseis (Love Radio Version)", as it also included a prologue to the song voiced by Garbi, in which she interprets her meaning of the song. During the recording of the single in the studio, Antipas brought together an ensemble of 24 classical orchestral musicians which can be heard throughout the song. The album version omits the spoken prologue.

"Geia Sou (Pazl)"

"Geia Sou" (Pazl) is set to be released as the official third single off the album. Although two previous tracks were released prior to the album's release, "Geia Sou" was promoted as the lead single from the album. The song is a ballad composed by Nikos Antipas with lyrics by GML.

== Release history ==
Region	Date	Label	Format	Catalog No.
Greece	28 March 2011	Universal Music	CD	2768502

== Charts ==
"Pazl" debuted on the Top 75 Combined album charts at number eleven. The album has since peaked at number 8 during its fifth week on the charts. The album made a re-entry in its 12th week at number 42 on the Top 75 Combined album charts.
