= Prova (album) =

Prova Πρόβα

Studio album by Katy Garbi
- Released: April 1989
- Recorded: 1988–1989
- Genre: Pop
- Length: 36:33
- Label: CBS Records Greece; Sony Music Greece/Columbia
- Producer: CBS Records Greece

Katy Garbi chronology
Prova; Πρόβα (1989)	Gyalia Karfia (1990)

Prova is the debut album by Greek recording artist Katy Garbi. It was released in 1989 by CBS Records Greece.

It was released on CD for the first time in 1992, under the Columbia label as a joint package with 1990's Gialia Karfia. In 1996, the album was re-released in a separate edition, as a part of the OK! Budget Price series Sony Music Greece launched at the time.

== Track listing ==
1. "Prova" (Rehearsal) - 3:47
2. "Toso Poli" (So much) - 3:47
3. "Mi Me Prodoseis" (Don't betray me) - 3:11
4. "Hrostame" (We owe) - 4:09
5. "Apofasi" (Decision) - 4:09
6. "Allo Ena (Hands Up)" (One More) - 3:11
7. "Oulala" - 3:43
8. "Mi, Mi (1,2,3)" (Don't, don't) - 3:11
9. "Na Meino I Na Figo (Los Amantes)" (Should I stay or should I leave) - 3:21
10. "Ksana Se Sena" (Again to you) - 4:10

== Music and lyrics ==
- On CD tracks 1–5 (Side A on LP and cassette pressings), music and lyrics are written by Yiannis Karalis.
- Tracks 6–9 are covers of well-known international hits, with Greek lyrics written by Panos Tsaparas.
- Track 10 is written entirely by Panos Tsaparas.

All tracks of the album are arranged by Stefanos Korkolis.

== Singles ==
1. "Prova"
2. "Toso Poli"
3. "Hrostame"
