= Prova =

Programming language

Prova is an open source programming language that combines Prolog with Java.

== Description ==
Prova is a rule-based scripting system that is used for middleware. The language combines imperative and declarative programming by using a prolog syntax that allows calls to Java functions. In this way a strong Java code base is combined with Prolog features such as backtracking.

Prova is derived from Mandarax, a Java-based inference system developed by Jens Dietrich. Prova extends Mandarax by providing a proper language syntax, native syntax integration with Java, agent messaging and reaction rules. The development of this language was supported by the grant provided within the EU projects GeneStream and BioGRID. In the project, the language is used as a rule-based backbone for distributed web applications in biomedical data integration, in particular, the GoPubMed system.

The design goals of Prova:

- Combine declarative and object-oriented programming.
- Expose logic and agent behavior as rules.
- Access data sources via wrappers written in Java or command-line shells like Perl.
- Make the Java API of various packages accessible as rules.
- Run within the Java runtime.
- Enable rapid prototyping of applications.
- Offer a rule-based platform for distributed agent programming.

Prova aims to provide support for data integration tasks when the following is important:

- Location transparency (local, remote, mirrors);
- Format transparency (database, RDF, XML, HTML, flat files, computation resource);
- Resilience to change (databases and web sites change often);
- Use of open and open source technologies;
- Understandability and modifiability by a non-IT specialist;
- Economical knowledge representation;
- Extensibility with additional functionality;
- Leveraging ontologies.

Prova has been used as the key service integration engine in the Xcalia product where it is used for computing efficient global execution plans across multiple data sources such as Web services, TP monitors transactions like CICS or IMS, messages of MOM like MQ-Series, packaged applications with a JCA connector, legacy data sources on mainframes with a JCA connector, remote EJB Java objects considered as data providers or even local Java objects. Prova allows to deliver an innovative software platform for Service-oriented architecture implementations.
