= Atofio Hrisafi (album) =

Atofio Hrisafi Ατόφιο Χρυσάφι

Studio album by Katy Garbi
- Released: November 14, 1994
- Recorded: City studio Sierra studio
- Genres: Pop, Modern Laika, Dance
- Length: 36:39
- Language: Greek
- Labels: Sony Music Greece; Columbia
- Producer: Giannis Doulamis

Katy Garbi chronology
| Os Ton Paradeiso (1993) | Atofio Hrisafi; Ατόφιο Χρυσάφι (1994) | Arhizo Polemo (1996) |

Singles from Atofio Hrisafi
- 1. "Xipoliti Horevo" Released: October 1994; 2. "Atofio Hrisafi" Released: December 1994; 3. "Mi Me Sigkrineis" Released: February 1995; 4. "Kolasi" Released: April 1995; 5. "Se Poliorkia (Pes, Pes)" Released: June 1995

Atofio Hrisafi (Greek: Ατόφιο Χρυσάφι; English: Pure Gold) is the sixth studio album by Greek singer, Katy Garbi. It was released on 14 November 1994 by Sony Music Greece and received double-platinum certification in Greece, selling over 120,000 units. The album was written by Kostas Tournas and Phoebus (five songs each), containing many of her successful songs including "Xipoliti Horevo", "Mi Me Sigkrineis" and "Atofio Hrisafi".

== Track listing ==
| No. | Title | Lyrics | Music | Length |
|---|---|---|---|---|
| 1. | "Xipoliti Horevo" (Ξυπόλυτη Χορεύω; I Dance Barefoot) | Kostas Tournas | Kostas Tournas | 4:13 |
| 2. | "I Agapas I Fevgeis" (Ή Αγαπάς Ή Φεύγεις; Love Or Leave) | Kostas Tournas | Kostas Tournas | 3:11 |
| 3. | "Oti Oneirevomaste Ginetai" (Ότι Ονειρευόμαστε Γίνεται; Whatever Our Dreams Become) | Kostas Tournas | Kostas Tournas | 3:11 |
| 4. | "Mi Me Sigkrineis" (Μη Με Συγκρίνεις; Don't Compare Me) | Kostas Tournas | Kostas Tournas | 4:03 |
| 5. | "Otan Se Xehaso" (Όταν Σε Ξεχάσω; When I Forget You) | Kostas Tournas | Kostas Tournas | 3:42 |
| 6. | "Se Poliorkia (Pes, Pes)" (Σε Πολιορκία (Πες, Πες); In Siege (Say It, Say It)) | Phoebus | Phoebus | 3:32 |
| 7. | "Kolasi" (Κόλαση; Hell) | Phoebus | Phoebus | 3:29 |
| 8. | "Atofio Hrisafi" (Ατόφιο Χρυσάφι; Pure Gold) | Phoebus | Phoebus | 3:25 |
| 9. | "O Ilios Pou Egine Vrohi" (Ο Ήλιος Που Έγινε Βροχή; The Sun That Became Rain) | Phoebus | Phoebus | 3:47 |
| 10. | "Moiazo" (Μοιάζω; I Resemble) | Phoebus | Phoebus | 4:06 |
| Total length: | | | | 36:39 |

== Singles ==
The following singles were officially released to radio stations with music videos and gained a lot of airplay.

1. "Xipoliti Horevo" (Ξυπόλυτη Χορεύω; I Dance Barefoot / Director: Nikos Soulis)
2. "Atofio Hrisafi" (Ατόφιο Χρυσάφι; Pure Gold / Director: Giorgos Sofoulis)
3. "Mi Me Sigkrineis" (Μη Με Συγκρίνεις; Don't Compare Me / Director: Giorgos Louizos)
4. "Kolasi" (Κόλαση; Hell / Director: Giorgos Louizos)
5. "Se Poliorkia (Pes, Pes)" (Σε Πολιορκία (Πες, Πες)); In Siege (Say It, Say It) / Director: Giorgos Louizos)

== Credits ==
Credits adapted from liner notes.

=== Personnel ===
- Haris Andreadis – orchestration (tracks 6, 7, 8, 9, 10)
- Giannis Bithikotsis – bouzouki, baglama (9)
- Charis Chalkitis, Nikos Logothetis, Sofia Noiti – backing vocals (tracks 6, 8)
- Antonis Gounaris – guitars (tracks 6, 7, 8, 9, 10) • cümbüş (tracks 6, 7, 10) • second vocal (tracks 7, 9)
- Yiotis Kiourtsoglou – bass (tracks 2, 3, 4)
- Stavros Lantsias – orchestration, programming, keyboards (tracks 1, 2, 3, 4, 5) • guitars (track 1)
- Giorgos Notaras – percussion (track 1)
- Thodoris Pasiaras – bouzouki (tracks 1, 4)
- Pimis Petrou, Sandy Politi, Dimitris Tsopanellis, Martha Zioga – backing vocals (tracks 2, 3, 5)
- Orestis Plakidis – programming, keyboards (tracks 6, 7, 8, 9, 10)
- Giorgos Roilos – percussion (tracks 7, 8)
- Silvios Siros – saxophone (track 5)
- Akis Tourkogiorgis – guitars (tracks 2, 3, 4)

=== Production ===
- Achilleas Charitos – make up
- Dinos Diamantopoulos – photographer
- Giannis Doulamis – production manager
- Giannis Doxas – art direction
- Giannis Ioannidis (Digital Press Hellas) – mastering
- Dimitris Malegkas, Giannis Tountas (City studio) – sound engineer, mix engineer (tracks 1, 2, 3, 4, 5)
- Giannis Michailidis – hair styling
- Panagiotis Petronikolos (Sierra studio) – sound engineer, mix engineer (tracks 6, 7, 8, 9, 10)

== Accolades ==
Atofio Hrisafi was gained two awards at the Pop Corn Music Awards 1995:

- Best Album of the Year
- Best Folk Dance Track (Xipoliti Horevo)
