= Tou Feggariou Anapnoes =

Tou Feggariou Anapnoes Του Φεγγαριού Αναπνοές

Studio album by Katy Garbi
- Released: 26 June 1992
- Recorded: Libra studio
- Genre: Pop, Dance, Modern Laika
- Length: 31:48
- Language: Greek
- Label: Sony Music Greece; Columbia
- Producer: Giannis Doulamis

Katy Garbi chronology
Entalma Sillipseos (1991)	Tou Feggariou Anapnoes; Του Φεγγαριού Αναπνοές (1992)	Os Ton Paradeiso (1993)

Singles from Tou Feggariou Anapnoes
- 1. "Tou Feggariou Anapnoes" Released: October 1992; 2. "Den Einai I Proti Fora" Released: November 1992; 3. "Zilia Mou" Released: December 1992; 4. "Pes To M' Ena Fili" Released: February 1993; 5. "S' Agapo Pio Poli" Released: April 1993; 6. "Lathos Porta" Released: June 1993

Tou Feggariou Anapnoes (Greek: Του Φεγγαριού Αναπνοές; English: The breaths of the moon) is the fourth studio album by Greek singer, Katy Garbi. It was released on 26 June 1992 by Sony Music Greece and received gold certification, selling over 50,000 units. The album featured Greek laika elements mixed with pop, and contains her first breakthrough hit "Pes To M' Ena Fili".

== Track listing ==
No.	Title	Lyrics	Music	Length
1.	"Tou Feggariou Anapnoes" (Του Φεγγαριού Αναπνοές; The Breaths Of The Moon)	Tasoula Thomaidou	Spiros Pazios	3:03
2.	"Den Einai I Proti Fora" (Δεν Είναι Η Πρώτη Φορά; It's Not The First Time)	Tasoula Thomaidou	Spiros Pazios	3:33
3.	"Zilia Mou" (Ζήλια Μου; My Jealousy)	Tasoula Thomaidou	Spiros Pazios	3:03
4.	"S' Agapo Pio Poli" (Σ' Αγαπώ Πιο Πολύ; I Love You Even More)	Tasoula Thomaidou	Spiros Pazios	3:50
5.	"Se Psilliastika" (Σε Ψυλλιάστηκα; I Suspected You)	Tasoula Thomaidou	Spiros Pazios	2:43
6.	"Lathos Porta" (Λάθος Πόρτα; Wrong Door)	Tasoula Thomaidou	Spiros Pazios	2:54
7.	"Tsifteteli" (Τσιφτετέλι; Tsifteteli)	Tasoula Thomaidou	Tolis Ketselidis	3:14
8.	"Pes To M' Ena Fili" (Πες Το Μ' Ένα Φιλί; Say It With A Kiss)	Natalia Germanou	Nikos Terzis	3:42
9.	"Kai Na 'Moun Dakri Sou" (Και Να 'Μουν Δάκρυ Σου; I Wish I Were Your Tear)	Manolis Doulianakis	Panagiotis Apostolidis	2:51
10.	"Ela, Mila Mou" (Έλα, Μίλα Μου; Come, Talk To Me)	Lazaros Komninos	Panagiotis Apostolidis	2:55
Total length:				31:48

== Singles ==
The following singles were officially released to radio stations with music videos and gained a lot of airplay.

1. "Tou Feggariou Anapnoes" (The Breaths Of The Moon)
2. "Den Einai I Proti Fora" (It's Not The First Time)
3. "Zilia Mou" (My Jealousy)
4. "Pes To M' Ena Fili" (Say It With A Kiss)
5. "S' Agapo Pio Poli" (I Love You Even More)
6. "Lathos Porta" (Wrong Door)

== Credits ==
Credits adapted from liner notes.

=== Personnel ===
- Haris Andreadis – orchestration (tracks 7, 8, 9, 10)
- Giannis Bithikotsis – bouzouki (track 9) • cura (tracks 7, 9)
- Stelios Goulielmos, Eva Tselidou, Marianna Zorba – backing vocals (tracks 8, 10)
- Antonis Gounaris – guitars (tracks 7, 8, 9, 10) • oud (7, 8)
- Tolis Ketselidis – programming, keyboards (all tracks except 8)
- Elina Konstantopoulou, Fanis Mezinis – backing vocals (tracks 1, 2, 3, 6)
- Stefanos Korkolis – accordion (track 1)
- Spiros Pazios – orchestration, programming, keyboards, guitars (tracks 1, 2, 3, 4, 5, 6)
- Nikos Terzis – programming, keyboards (track 8)

=== Production ===
- Dinos Diamantopoulos – photographer
- Giannis Doulamis – production manager
- Giannis Doxas – art direction
- Giannis Ioannidis (Digital Press Hellas) – mastering
- Tolis Ketselidis (Libra studio) – sound engineer, mix engineer
- Athina Lekakou – photographer's assistant
