= Evaisthisies =

Evaisthisies Ευαισθησίες

Studio album by Katy Garbi
- Released: October 20, 1997
- Recorded: Phase One studio
- Genres: Pop, Modern Laika, Dance
- Length: 50:24
- Language: Greek
- Labels: Sony Music Greece; Columbia
- Producer: Giannis Doulamis

Katy Garbi chronology
Arhizo Polemo (1996)	Evaisthisies; Ευαισθησίες (1997)	Christougenna Me Tin Katy (1998)

Singles from Evaisthisies
- 1. "Ierosilia" Released: September 1997; 2. "Evaisthisies" Released: October 1997; 3. "Mou Leipeis" Released: December 1997; 4. "Triferotita" Released: January 1998; 5. "Asimfonia Haraktiron" Released: February 1998; 6. "I Patrida Mou" Released: March 1998; 7. "Kivotos" Released: April 1998; 8. "Apozimiosi" Released: May 1998

Evaisthisies (Greek: Ευαισθησίες; English: Sensitivities) is the eighth studio album by Greek artist Katy Garbi. It was released on 20 October 1997 by Sony Music Greece and certified platinum in 2 days, but after months received triple-platinum certification, selling over 160,000 units. The album was written entirely by Phoebus. It was the second best-selling Greek album of 1997, and Katy's second top-seller album, containing many of her most successful songs like "Ierosilia", "Evaisthisies", "Triferotita" and "Kivotos". On 21 March 2022, was released a vinyl edition of album; the tracklist included live covers and duets as a bonus.

== Track listing ==
=== Original edition ===
All tracks are written by Phoebus.

No.	Title	Length
1.	"Ierosilia" (Ιεροσυλία; Sacrilege)	3:39
2.	"Mou Leipeis" (Μου Λείπεις; I Miss You)	5:08
3.	"Evaisthisies" (Ευαισθησίες; Sensitivities)	4:19
4.	"Triferotita" (Τρυφερότητα; Tenderness)	4:11
5.	"I Patrida Mou (ft. Antonis Vardis)" (Η Πατρίδα Μου; My Homeland)	4:06
6.	"Kivotos" (Κιβωτός; Ark)	4:13
7.	"Allo Esi Ki Allo Ego" (Άλλο Εσύ Κι Άλλο Εγώ; Another You And Another Me)	3:52
8.	"Apozimiosi" (Αποζημίωση; Compensation)	4:42
9.	"Ola Sta Katalogizo" (Όλα Στα Καταλογίζω; I Impute Everything To You)	4:17
10.	"Fougaro" (Φουγάρο; Chimney)	4:06
11.	"Apologisou" (Απολογήσου; Apologize)	4:02
12.	"Asimfonia Haraktiron (ft. Antonis Remos)" (Ασυμφωνία Χαρακτήρων; Mismatch Of Characters)	3:50
Total length:		50:24

=== LP Re-issue ===
Side A
No.	Title	Length
1.	"Ierosilia"	3:39
2.	"Mou Leipeis"	5:08
3.	"Evaisthisies"	4:13
4.	"Triferotita"	4:10
Total length:		17:10

Side B
No.	Title	Length
1.	"I Patrida Mou (ft. Antonis Vardis)"	4:06
2.	"Kivotos"	4:11
3.	"Allo Esi Ki Allo Ego"	3:51
4.	"Apozimiosi"	4:40
Total length:		16:50

Side C
No.	Title	Length
1.	"Ola Sta Katalogizo"	4:17
2.	"Fougaro"	4:06
3.	"Apologisou"	4:01
4.	"Asimfonia Haraktiron (ft. Antonis Remos)"	3:46
Total length:		16:10

Side D
No.	Title	Length
1.	"Kivotos (ft. Antonis Remos)"	3:22
2.	"I Patrida Mou (ft. Melisses)"	3:05
3.	"Ierosilia (Live)"	3:05
4.	"Triferotita (Live)"	2:02
5.	"Evaisthisies (Live)"	1:51
6.	"Asimfonia Haraktiron (ft. Antonis Remos) (Live)"	4:43
Total length:		18:08

==== Bonus 7" Single ====
Side A
No.	Title	Length
1.	"Atofio Hrisafi (ft. Dionisis Schinas)"	3:00

Side B
No.	Title	Length
1.	"Atofio Hrisafi"	3:23

== Singles ==
The success of the album released eight of twelve songs becoming singles to radio stations with music videos and gained massive airplay.

1. "Ierosilia" (Ιεροσυλία; Sacrilege / Director: Giorgos Gkavalos)
2. "Evaisthisies" (Ευαισθησίες; Sensitivities / Director: Giorgos Gkavalos)
3. "Mou Leipeis" (Μου Λείπεις; I Miss You / Director: Vaggelis Kalaitzis)
4. "Triferotita" (Τρυφερότητα; Tenderness / Director: Vaggelis Kalaitzis)
5. "Asimfonia Haraktiron" (Ασυμφωνία Χαρακτήρων; Personality Clash / Director: Vaggelis Kalaitzis)
6. "I Patrida Mou" (Η Πατρίδα Μου; My Homeland / Director: Dimitris Sotas)
7. "Kivotos" (Κιβωτός; Ark / Director: Vaggelis Kalaitzis)
8. "Apozimiosi" (Αποζημίωση; Restitution / Director: Vaggelis Kalaitzis)

== Credits ==
Credits adapted from liner notes.

=== Personnel ===
- Charis Andreadis – [extra] orchestration (track 12)
- Aggelos Avgeris, Rania Dizikiriki, Katerina Kiriakou, Alex Panayi, Martha Zioga – backing vocals (tracks 2, 3, 6, 7, 9, 10, 11)
- Hakan Bingolou – säz (tracks 3, 12)
- Giannis Bithikotsis – bouzouki (tracks 2, 4, 9, 10, 11) • cura (tracks 1, 2, 5, 6) • baglama (tracks 1, 2, 4, 10, 11) • mandolin (track 8)
- Antonis Gounaris – guitars (all tracks) • cümbüş (tracks 6, 7, 9)
- Giotis Kiourtsoglou – bass (all tracks except 12)
- Dimitris Kokotas, Giorgos Lebesis – backing vocals (tracks 1, 9)
- Giorgos Kostoglou – bass (track 12)
- Antonis Koulouris – drums (track 12)
- Fedon Lionoudakis – accordion (tracks 2, 3, 4, 5, 8, 11)
- Andreas Mouzakis – drums (tracks 1, 2, 3, 4, 5, 8, 10, 11)
- Phoebus – orchestration, programming, keyboards • backing vocals (tracks 1, 9)
- Antonis Remos – backing vocals (tracks 1, 9) / second vocal (track 4)
- Giorgos Roilos – percussion (tracks 1, 2, 3, 5, 6, 7, 8, 9, 10, 11)
- Dionisis Schinas – second vocal (track 8)
- Thanasis Vasilopoulos – clarinet (tracks 1, 5, 12) • ney (track 9)

=== Production ===
- Katia Dimopoulou – cover processing
- Giannis Doulamis – production manager
- Antonis Glikos – art direction
- Giannis Ioannidis (Digital Press Hellas) – mastering
- Giannis Michailidis – grooming
- Manolis Vlachos (Phase One studio) – sound engineer, mix engineer
- Tasos Vrettos – photographer

== Charts ==
Chart	Providers	Peak Position	Certification
Greek Albums Chart	IFPI	1	3×Platinum
Cypriot Album Chart	Musical Paradise Top 10	1	2×Platinum

== Accolades ==
Evaisthisies received three awards at the Pop Corn Music Awards 1998:

- Best Album of the Year
- Best Song Of The Year (Evaisthisies)
- Track With Most Airplay of 1998 on Sfera 102.1 (Evaisthisies)
