= Entalma Sillipseos =

Entalma Sillipseos Ένταλμα Συλλήψεως

Studio album by Katy Garbi
- Released: 6 September 1991
- Recorded: Digital studio Sierra studio
- Genre: Pop, Dance
- Length: 33:52 (Original edition); 51:29 (Re-release edition)
- Language: Greek
- Label: Sony Music Greece; Columbia
- Producer: Giannis Doulamis

Katy Garbi chronology
Gialia Karfia (1990)	Entalma Sillipseos; Ένταλμα Συλλήψεως (1991)	Tou Feggariou Anapnoes (1992)

Singles from Entalma Sillipseos
- 1. "Entalma Sillipseos" Released: September 1991; 2. "Prosopo Me Prosopo" Released: November 1991; 3. "Svise Me" Released: January 1992; 4. "Fimes" Released: March 1992; 5. "Thelo Na Kano Mazi Sou Mia Trela" Released: May 1992

Entalma Sillipseos (Greek: Ένταλμα Συλλήψεως; English: Arrest warrant) is the third album by Greek singer, Katy Garbi. It was released on 6 September 1991 by Sony Music Greece and was certified gold by IFPI Greece, selling 30,000 units. The album was re-released including prior singles from her first two albums as a bonus. It also contains her first hits "Entalma Sillipseos", "Prosopo Me Prosopo" and "Fimes".

== Track listing ==
Original edition
No.	Title	Lyrics	Music	Length
1.	"Entalma Sillipseos" (Ένταλμα Συλλήψεως; Arrest Warrant)	Nikos Vaxavanelis	Andreas Mexas	3:02
2.	"Prosopo Me Prosopo" (Πρόσωπο Με Πρόσωπο; Face To Face)	Dimitris Andrias	Konstantinos Bosnakis; Manolis Doulianakis	3:00
3.	"Svise Me" (Σβήσε Με; Erase Me)	Tasoula Thomaidou	Ilias Achladiotis	3:58
4.	"Ainigma" (Αίνιγμα; Enigma)	Ilias Filippou	Antonis Gounaris	4:03
5.	"Kaneis, Kaneis" (Κάνεις, Κάνεις; You're doing, You're doing)	Nansy Kanelli	Xenia Dikeou	3:09
6.	"Fimes" (Φήμες; Rumours)	Ilias Filippou	Antonis Gounaris	3:49
7.	"Psemata" (Ψέματα; Lies)	Nikos Doulamis	Nikos Doulamis	2:43
8.	"Saten" (Σατέν; Satin)	Tasoula Thomaidou	Ilias Achladiotis	3:46
9.	"Ble Thalassi" (Μπλε Θαλασσί; Ocean Blue)	Tasoula Thomaidou	Ilias Achladiotis	2:59
10.	"Thelo Na Kano Mazi Sou Mia Trela" (Θέλω Να Κάνω Μαζί Σου Μια Τρέλα; I Want To Do Something Crazy With You)	Nansy Kanelli	Xenia Dikeou	3:23
Total length:				33:52

Re-release edition (Bonus tracks)
No.	Title	Lyrics	Music	Length
11.	"Sto Sain Trope †" (Στο Σαιν Τροπέ; At Saint Tropez)	Takis Karnatsos	Cenci & Faiella	2:40
12.	"Prova †" (Πρόβα; Rehearsal)	Giannis Karalis	Giannis Karalis	3:46
13.	"Fantasmataki †" (Φαντασματάκι; Little Ghost)	Nikos Doulamis	Nikos Doulamis	4:01
14.	"Gialia Karfia †" (Γυαλιά Καρφιά; Glasses And Nails)	Anastasia Moutsatsou	Ilias Achladiotis	3:23
15.	"Psemataki †" (Ψεματάκι; Little Lie)	Giannis Nikolaou	Giannis Nikolaou	3:47
Total length:				51:29

- † only on the CD issue of the album

== Singles ==
The following singles were officially released to radio stations and made into music videos, except the song "Fimes", gained a lot of airplay:

1. "Entalma Sillipseos" (Arrest Warrant)
2. "Prosopo Me Prosopo" (Face To Face)
3. "Svise Me" (Erase Me)
4. "Fimes" (Rumours)
5. "Thelo Na Kano Mazi Sou Mia Trela" (I Want To Do Something Crazy With You)

== Credits ==
Credits adapted from the liner notes.

=== Personnel ===
- Ilias Achladiotis – orchestration, programming, keyboards (tracks 3, 8, 9)
- Katerina Adamantidou, Stelios Goulielmos, Sandy Politi – backing vocals (tracks 2, 4, 6, 10)
- Haris Andreadis – orchestration, keyboards (tracks 1, 2, 4, 5, 6, 7, 10)
- Dimitris Barbagalas – guitars (tracks 1, 2, 3, 7, 8, 9)
- Antonis Gounaris – guitars (tracks 4, 5, 6, 10)
- Haris Kelaris – bass (tracks 1, 5, 7)
- Avet Kizirian – programming (tracks 1, 2, 4, 5, 6, 7, 10)
- Lazaros Koulaxizis – accordion (track 5)
- Stefanos Stefanopoulos – flute (track 7)
- Takis Paterelis – saxophone (tracks 1, 7, 9)
- Notis Sfakianakis – second vocal (tracks 1, 5)

=== Production ===
- Makis Achladiotis (Sierra studio) – sound engineer (tracks 3, 8, 9)
- Achilleas Charitos – grooming
- Dinos Diamantopoulos – photographer
- Giannis Doulamis – executive producer
- Kostas Giannakopoulos (Digital studio) – sound engineer (tracks 1, 2, 4, 5, 6, 7, 10)
- Akis Gounaris – art direction
- Giannis Ioannidis (Digital Press Hellas) – mastering
- Panagiotis Petronikolos (Sierra studio) – mix engineer
