= Os Ton Paradeiso =

Os Ton Paradeiso Ως Τον Παράδεισο

Studio album by Katy Garbi
- Released: 5 November 1993
- Recorded: Sierra studio
- Genre: Pop, Modern Laika
- Length: 38:35
- Language: Greek
- Label: Sony Music Greece; Columbia
- Producer: Giannis Doulamis

Katy Garbi chronology
| Tou Feggariou Anapnoes (1992) | Os Ton Paradeiso; Ως Τον Παράδεισο (1993) | Atofio Hrisafi (1994) |

Singles from Os Ton Paradeiso
- 1. "Ellada, Hora Tou Fotos" Released: April 1993; 2. "Nai, Iparho Ego" Released: September 1993; 3. "Os Ton Paradeiso" Released: November 1993; 4. "O Kafes" Released: December 1993; 5. "Akouo Tin Kardoula Sou" Released: February 1994; 6. "Derti" Released: April 1994

Os Ton Paradeiso (Greek: Ως Τον Παράδεισο; English: Until The Paradise) is the fifth studio album by Greek singer Katy Garbi. It was released on 5 November 1993 by Sony Music Greece and received platinum certification, selling over 80,000 units. The album was written by various artists and contains four songs written by Phoebus, marking their first studio collaboration. It also contains a dance remix of "Ellada, chora tou fotos" with which she represented Greece at Eurovision Song Contest 1993.

== Track listing ==
| No. | Title | Lyrics | Music | Length |
|---|---|---|---|---|
| 1. | "Nai, Iparho Ego" (Ναι, Υπάρχω Εγώ; Yes, I Exist) | Phoebus | Phoebus | 3:03 |
| 2. | "Os Ton Paradeiso" (Ως Τον Παράδεισο; Until The Paradise) | Phoebus | Phoebus | 4:45 |
| 3. | "O Kafes" (Ο Καφές; The Coffee) | Giannis Doxas | Orestis Plakidis | 4:20 |
| 4. | "I Agapi Mas" (Η Αγάπη Μας; Our Love) | Phoebus | Phoebus | 3:14 |
| 5. | "Akouo Tin Kardoula Sou" (Ακούω Την Καρδούλα Σου; I Listen To Your Heart) | Phoebus | Phoebus | 3:03 |
| 6. | "Derti (Original Turkish Version: Faka Bastın)" (Ντέρτι; Horny) | Evi Droutsa | Şehrazat | 3:39 |
| 7. | "Fotia I Zilia" (Φωτιά Η Ζήλια; Fire (Is) The Jealousy) | Panos Falaras | Ilias Achladiotis | 2:43 |
| 8. | "Kai Na Mou Les To "S' Agapo"" (Και Να Μου Λες Το Σ' Αγαπώ; And You Tell Me That You Love Me) | Panos Falaras | Panagiotis Lallis | 4:10 |
| 9. | "Opou Fisaei O Anemos" (Όπου Φυσάει Ο Άνεμος; Where The Wind Blows) | Lazaros Komninos | Panagiotis Apostolidis | 3:01 |
| 10. | "Kai Me Mialo Kai Me Kormi" (Και Με Μυαλό Και Με Κορμί; And With My Mind And With My Body) | Anna Ioannidou | Ilias Achladiotis | 3:39 |
| 11. | "Ellada, chora tou fotos (Dance Mix)" (Ελλάδα, Χώρα Του Φωτός; Greece, Land Of Light) | Dimosthenis Stringlis | Dimosthenis Stringlis | 2:58 |
| Total length: | | | | 38:35 |

== Singles ==
The following singles were officially released to radio stations with music videos, except the song "Akouo Tin Kardoula Sou", and gained a lot of airplay.

1. "Ellada, chora tou fotos" (Ελλάδα, Χώρα Του Φωτός; Greece, Land Of Light)
2. "Nai, Iparho Ego" (Ναι, Υπάρχω Εγώ; Yes, I Exist)
3. "Os Ton Paradeiso" (Ως Τον Παράδεισο; Until The Paradise)
4. "O Kafes" (Ο Καφές; The Coffee)
5. "Akouo Tin Kardoula Sou" (Ακούω Την Καρδούλα Σου; I Listen To Your Heart)
6. "Nterti" (Ντέρτι; Longing)

== Credits ==
Credits adapted from liner notes.

=== Personnel ===
- Ilias Achladiotis – orchestration, programming, keyboards (tracks 7, 10)
- Haris Andreadis – orchestration, programming, keyboards (track 11)
- Kostas Antonopoulos – second vocal (track 7)
- Giannis Bithikotsis – bouzouki (tracks 1, 7, 9) • cura (tracks 1, 5, 10) • baglama (track 9)
- Nikos Chatzopoulos – oud (track 8) • violin (tracks 2, 6, 8)
- Vasilis Gkinos – orchestration, programming, keyboards (tracks 1, 4, 5, 6, 9)
- Stelios Goulielmos, Anna Ioannidou, Daphne Papatheodorou – backing vocals (tracks 1, 4, 5, 6, 10)
- Antonis Gounaris – guitars (tracks 1, 3, 5, 7, 9, 10) • oud (track 3) • cümbüş (track 1)
- Giannis Ioannou – accordion (tracks 2, 9)
- Sakis Katsatsos – bass (tracks 3, 7, 10)
- Stella Konitopoulou – second vocal (tracks 2, 8)
- Panagiotis Lallis – orchestration, programming, keyboards, guitars (tracks 2, 8)
- Orestis Plakidis – orchestration, programming, keyboards (track 3)
- Spiros Spirakos – second vocal (track 9)
- Charis Varthakouris – second vocal (track 8)

=== Production ===
- Giannis Doulamis – production manager
- Giannis Doxas – art direction
- Giannis Ioannidis (Digital Press Hellas) – mastering
- Kostas Kalimeris (Sierra studio) – sound engineer, mix engineer (tracks 1, 3, 4, 6, 7, 9, 10, 11)
- Konstantinos Kaspiris – styling
- Panagiotis Lallis (Sierra studio) – sound engineer, mix engineer (tracks 2, 8)
- Athina Lekakou – photographer
- Spiros Pashos – hair styling
- Olga Papaefthimiadou – make up
- Orestis Plakidis (Sierra studio) – mix engineer (track 11)
- Sakis Trikis (Sierra studio) – sound engineer, mix engineer (track 5)
