= Spase Tous Deiktes =

2017 studio album by Greek singer Katy Garbi

Spase tous deiktes Σπάσε τους δείκτες

Studio album by Katy Garbi
- Released: 20 December 2017
- Recorded: Bi-Kay studio
- Genre: Pop, Modern Laika, Dance
- Length: 54:45
- Language: Greek
- Label: Panik Platinum
- Producer: Leonidas Tzitzos

Katy Garbi chronology
Perierges Meres (2013)	Spase tous deiktes Σπάσε τους δείκτες (2017)	30 Hronia Katy Garbi (Live Katrakio 2019) (2020)

Singles from Spase tous deiktes
- 1. "Koita s' agapao" Released: 14 December 2015; 2. "Avrio" Released: 31 October 2016; 3. "Kaneis san esena" Released: 5 April 2017; 4. "Vale mia teleia" Released: 10 November 2017; 5. "Spase tous deiktes tou rologiou" Released: 5 February 2018; 6. "San tsigaro" Released: 2 May 2018; 7. "Mia kiria" Released: 1 October 2018

Spase tous deiktes (Greek: Σπάσε τους δείκτες; English: Break the markers) is the 20th studio album by Greek singer, Katy Garbi. It was released on 20 December 2017 by Panik Platinum, marking Garbi's first album release with the Panik label, and later received gold certification, selling over 6,000 units. It was produced by Leonidas Tzitzos and includes new and past collaborators including Giorgos Sabanis, Natalia Germanou, Ilias Kabakakis, Eleni Giannatsoulia, Dimitris Kontopoulos, Nikos Gritsis and Kostas Miliotakis. The album is a continuation of the modern laika with pop genre since the previous platinum release Perierges Meres, four years prior. It also reintroduces Katy to the dance genre for the first time since 2005, comprising two dance tracks, "Kardia alitissa" and "Kaneis san esena". The album's release coincided with Garbi's live performances at the clubs Stage in Thessaloniki, and Iera Odos in Athens, alongside Vasilis Karras and Christos Menidiatis. The album featured two tracks penned by Karras, one of which was recorded as a duet titled "Oute Lexi".

While the album was being recorded, Garbi released three singles that were not included in the album. The first not-included single was "Eleftheri" (music: Georgina Karahaliou & JP, lyrics: Niki Papatheohari) which was released on 24 April 2015, the second was "Tin kardia sou rota" (music: Thanos Georgoulas, lyrics: Natalia Germanou) which was released only in Turkey on 21 December 2015, and the third was "Savvatovrado" (music: Marios Psimopoulos, lyrics: Eleni Giannatsoulia) which was released on 9 July 2016.

== Track listing ==
No.	Title	Lyrics	Music	Notes	Length
1.	"Ola plironontai edo" (Όλα πληρώνονται εδώ; Everything Is Paid Here)	Eleni Giannatsoulia	Ilias Kabakakis		3:30
2.	"Vrehei mesa, vrehei exo" (Βρέχει μέσα, βρέχει έξω; It's raining inside, It's raining outside)	Vaggelis Konstantinidis	Gavriil Gavriiloglou		4:07
3.	"Spase tous deiktes tou rologiou" (Σπάσε τους δείκτες του ρολογιού; Break the time markers)	Eleni Giannatsoulia	Giorgos Sabanis	Contains sample from song "Anemodarmena ipsi"	3:46
4.	"Mia Kiria" (Μια κυρία; A lady)	Vaggelis Konstantinidis	Giannis Fraseris		3:30
5.	"Kardia alitissa" (Καρδιά αλήτισσα; Vagabond heart)	Smaroula Maragkoudaki	Kostas Miliotakis		3:26
6.	"Vale mia teleia" (Βάλε μια τελεία; Make a pause)	Vasilis Karras	Gavriil Gavriiloglou		3:26
7.	"San tsigaro" (Σαν τσιγάρο; Like cigarette)	Smaroula Maragkoudaki	Kostas Miliotakis		3:15
8.	"Oute lexi (ft. Vasilis Karras)" (Ούτε λέξη; Not a word)	Vasilis Karras	Gavriil Gavriiloglou		3:49
9.	"Skorpia" (Σκόρπια; Scattered)	Nikos Gritsis	Dimitris Kontopoulos		3:50
10.	"San enilikes" (Σαν ενήλικες; Like adults)	Aggeliki Makrinioti	Iordanis Pavlou		3:42
11.	"Exomologisou" (Εξομολογήσου; Confess)	Vaggelis Konstantinidis	Giannis Fraseris		3:37
12.	"Ehei sima i kardia mou" (Έχει σήμα η καρδιά μου; My heart has a signal)	Giannis Gounas	Makis Berdes		3:39
13.	"Koita s' agapao" (Κοίτα σ' αγαπάω; Look, I love you)	Natalia Germanou	Thanos Georgoulas	Also released as duet with Turkish singer Burak Kut titled "Kalbine Sor"	4:03
14.	"Kaneis san esena" (Κανείς σαν εσένα; Nobody like you)	Aggeliki Makrinioti	Iordanis Pavlou		3:23
15.	"Avrio" (Αύριο; Tomorrow)	Nikos Gritsis	Giorgos Sabanis		3:42
Total length:					54:45

== Singles ==
Spase tous deiktes produced four singles prior its release.

"Koita s' agapao"

The album's first single was "Koita S' Agapao" (music: Thanos Georgoulas, lyrics: Natalia Germanou), which was released in two versions. The tracks were produced in Greece, Turkey and England. The album version was released as a teaser via Garbi's official YouTube channel on 30 November 2015. The single was officially released via iTunes on 14 December 2015. It featured only Garbi's vocals, recorded at Bi-Kay studio (Greece), the music in Turkey and the mixing and mastering in London, at La Boutique Studio by well-known producer Matteo Cifelli. The music video for the track aired on 28 December 2015 via Garbi's official YouTube channel. It was directed by Garbi's long time visual collaborator, Victoria Vellopoulou. The video was filmed on the island of Mykonos, Greece and is the first Garbi video directed by Vellopoulou to feature Garbi singing the lyrics unlike previous works. It features Turkish singer Burak Kut as the love interest, whose vocals are featured on the second version. The second version has Greek and Turkish lyrics performed by Garbi and Kut respectively (music: Thanos Giorgoulas, Greek lyrics: Natalia Germanou, Turkish lyrics: Burak Kut). The track was made available on 15 December 2015 and a corresponding video was released on 1 February 2016 directed by Victoria Vellopoulou from the same shoot as its predecessor. Both recordings feature 22 Turkish violins in the composition. The song gained much radio airplay and signaled Garbi's album return.

"Avrio"

The album's second single was "Avrio" (music: Giorgos Sabanis, lyrics: Nikos Gritsis). On 17 October 2016 the Panik Platinum leaked a short teaser of the track on YouTube which was picked up by several radio stations across Greece. The single was officially released on 31 October 2016 and gained much radio airplay. The music video was released on 24 February 2017 and directed by Victoria Vellopoulou, and was based on a timeline in three different global locations over three dates. It featured international model, Paraskevas Bourbourakas, as Garbi's love interest and actress, Miriella Kourenti, as Garbi's past self.

"Kaneis san esena"

The third single, "Kaneis san esena" (music: Iordanis Pavlou, lyrics: Aggeliki Makrinioti), is a dance track and marks Garbi's first return to the genre since 2005. The single was first showcased on 2 April 2017 on ANT1 Greek talent show Rising Star. Garbi was an invited guest of Despina Vandi, also performing other songs live with the two remaining 'Team Vandi' contestants. The track was officially released by Panik Platinum on 5 April 2017. The track gained much radio airplay throughout the summer and was remixed by DeeHayParis & Harris V. and released on 7 June 2017.

"Vale mia teleia"

The album's fourth single, "Vale mia teleia" (music: Gavriil Gavriiloglou, lyrics: Vasilis Karras), was released on 10 November 2017. The digital release also includes an acoustic version. The single was released in the form of a music video directed by Victoria Vellopoulou on the same day of its digital release. The music video features Garbi in a montage of photoshoots, of which one of the noticeable backdrops is the artwork from Garbi's 2001 album Apla Ta Pragmata. The song received much radio airplay. The single which featured the backing vocals of Vasilis Karras acted as a promotional piece for Garbi's scheduled performances with Vasilis Karras and Christos Menidiatis at 'Stage', Thessaloniki which commenced on 24 November 2017.

"Spase tous deiktes tou rologiou"

The title track "Spase tous deiktes tou rologiou" was the album's fifth single. It was released to radio airplay on 5 February 2018 and on YouTube the day of the album's official release. The track was written by both writers (music: Giorgos Sabanis, lyrics: Eleni Giannatsoulia) involved in the production of well received track "Anemodarmena ipsi", and subsequently samples a segment of the song before the first chorus.

"San tsigaro"

The sixth single from the album was "San tsigaro" (music: Kostas Miliotakis, lyrics: Smaroula Maragkoudaki). It was announced by Panik Platinum on 2 May 2018 and gained airplay.

"Mia kiria"

The seventh and last single from the album was "Mia kiria" (music: Giannis Fraseris, lyrics: Vaggelis Konstantinidis). It was announced by Panik Platinum on 1 October 2018 and received airplay.

== Credits ==
=== Personnel ===
- Christos Bousdoukos – violin (2, 4)
- Panagiotis Brakoulias – guitars, oud (15)
- Victoria Chalkiti – backing vocals (14)
- Akis Diximos – second vocal (10) • backing vocals (3, 5, 7, 12, 14)
- Giannis Fraseris – backing vocals (4, 11)
- Gavriil Gavriiloglou – second vocal (6)
- Thanos Georgoulas – orchestration, programming, keyboards (13)
- Kostas Gontikakis – Cretan lyre (5)
- Giannis Grigoriou – bass (1, 4, 6, 8, 10, 11)
- Gündem Yaylı Grubu – violin, viola, cello (13)
- Giorgos Kostoglou – bass (13)
- Apostolis Mallias – clarinet (6, 8, 11) • duduk (3) • ney (3, 6, 8, 11)
- Marios Mourmouras – guitars (13)
- Andreas Mouzakis – drums (1, 4, 6, 8, 10, 11, 13)
- Stavros Papagiannakopoulos – mandolin (10) • baglama (4) • säz (1, 4, 6, 7) • oud (1) • cümbüş (7, 9)
- Giorgos Retikas – guitars (11, 12)
- Leonidas Tzitzos – orchestration, programming, keyboards (all except 13)
- Panagiotis Vounatsos – guitars (3, 8)
- Phoebus Zaharopoulos – guitars (1, 2, 4, 6, 7, 9, 10)

=== Production ===
- Kiriakos Asteriou (Bi-Kay studio) – recording (all except 15) • mixing (all except 13 & 15)
- Babis Biris (Bi-Kay studio) – mastering (all except 13)
- Vasilis Bouloubasis – hair styling
- Panagiotis Brakoulias (Track Factory Recording studio) – recording, mixing (15)
- Matteo Cifelli (La Boutique studio) – mixing, mastering (13)
- Giannis Gkiouras – recording, editing (8)
- Christina Kazagli – artwork
- Vaggelis Kiris – photographer
- Dionisis Kolpodinos – styling
- Leonidas Tzitzos – executive producer
- Manos Vynichakis – make up

== Charts ==
Spase tous deiktes debuted on the IFPI Top 75 Albums chart at number 23. The album climbed to 16th position and remained on the charts for 14 weeks, before falling out of the Top 75 and re-entering for a further three weeks climbing to 38th position, one year after its initial release.

Chart	Peak position	Certification
Greek Albums Chart (IFPI Greece)	16	Gold

== Awards ==
Spase tous deiktes received multiple award nominations in 2018 at the MAD Video Music Awards (Greece) and the Super Music Awards (Cyprus), resulting in no wins.

Year	Event	Nominee/Work	Award	Result
2018	MAD Video Music Awards	Katy Garbi	Best Female Adult	Nominated
2018	Super Music Awards	Katy Garbi	Best Female (Laiko)	Nominated
2018	Super Music Awards	Spase Tous Deiktes	Album of the Year	Nominated
2018	Super Music Awards	Katy Garbi/Vasilis Karras - Oute lexi	Best Duet/Collaboration	Nominated
2017	Super Music Awards	Katy Garbi	Best Female (Laiko)	Nominated
