= Doro Theou =

Doro Theou Δώρο Θεού

Studio album by Katy Garbi
- Released: June 21, 1999
- Recorded: Sierra studio
- Genres: Pop, Modern Laika
- Length: 53:20
- Language: Greek
- Labels: Sony Music Greece; Columbia
- Producer: Giannis Doulamis

Katy Garbi chronology
Christougenna Me Tin Katy (1998)	Doro Theou; Δώρο Θεού (1999)	To Kati (2000)

Singles from Doro Theou
- 1. "Doro Theou" Released: June 21, 1999; 2. "Agkires" Released: August 2, 1999; 3. "Aponomi Dikaiosinis" Released: September 27, 1999

Doro Theou (Greek: Δώρο Θεού; English: God's gift) is the tenth studio album by Greek singer, Katy Garbi. It was released on 21 June 1999 by Sony Music Greece and received platinum certification, selling over 80,000 units. The album was written by various artists including Giorgos Theofanous who composed six songs, and Antonis Vardis, Christos Nikolopoulos, Kiriakos Papadopoulos, Evi Droutsa and Ilias Filippou. It also includes the music video of the title track, due to the video's release prior to the release of the album, and two of the tracks are adapted: "Agkires" from "Iste Hendek, Iste Deve" and "Zilia" from "Kalast Feek Kol Alkalam". Doro Theou is often considered a dedication to Garbi's son because it was released during her pregnancy, however the album's insert clarifies that the dedication belongs to her husband, Dionisis, with the lyrics of the title track describing the real-life story of the couple.

== Track listing ==
No.	Title	Lyrics	Music	Length
1.	"Doro Theou" (Δώρο Θεού; God's Gift)	Gioula Georgiou	Giorgos Theofanous	3:56
2.	"Anisos Agonas" (Άνισος Αγώνας; Unequal Match)	Ilias Philippou	Giorgos Kafetzopoulos	3:38
3.	"Agkires" (Άγκυρες; Anchors)	Eleni Gianatsoulia	Savvas Angin	3:55
4.	"Pos Fovamai Na Sou Po" (Πως Φοβάμαι Να Σου Πω; How I'm Scared To Say To You)	Gioula Georgiou	Antonis Vardis	4:29
5.	"Ano Kato" (Άνω Κάτω; Upside Down)	Natali	Kiriakos Papadopoulos	3:23
6.	"Tha Mas Horisoune, Agapi Mou" (Θα Μας Χωρίσουνε, Αγάπη Μου; They'll Separate Us, My Love)	Evi Droutsa	Giorgos Theofanous	3:50
7.	"Eisai O Erotas Pou De Pernaei" (Είσαι Ο Έρωτας Που Δε Περνάει; You're The Love That Doesn't Pass)	Panos Falaras	Kiriakos Papadopoulos	3:38
8.	"Diskolos Erotas" (Δύσκολος Έρωτας; Hard Love)	Eleni Gianatsoulia	Christos Nikolopoulos	4:06
9.	"Fersou Entaxei" (Φέρσου Εντάξει; Bring It On Well)	Eleni Gianatsoulia	Kiriakos Papadopoulos	3:29
10.	"Aponomi Dikaiosinis" (Απονομή Δικαιοσύνης; Justice Served)	Gioula Georgiou	Giorgos Theofanous	3:25
11.	"Fleva" (Φλέβα; Vein)	Evi Droutsa	Giorgos Theofanous	3:47
12.	"Sta Deka Metra" (Στα Δέκα Μέτρα; At Ten Meters)	Evi Droutsa	Giorgos Theofanous	3:28
13.	"Zilia [Kalast Feek Kol Alkalam]" (Ζήλια; Jealousy)	Eleni Gianatsoulia	Amar Tantawy; Abdul Monem	4:47
14.	"Hasame Tin Agapi Mas" (Χάσαμε Την Αγάπη Μας; We Lost Our Love)	Evi Droutsa	Giorgos Theofanous	3:29
Total length:				53:20

== Singles ==
The album wasn't widely promoted due to Katy's pregnancy and released only three of fourteen songs becoming singles to radio stations with music videos, directed by Giorgos Gkavalos, and gained massive airplay. The songs "Anisos Agonas", "Ano Kato", "Eisai O Erotas Pou De Pernaei" and "Fleva" were not released as singles, but had good airplay.

=== "Doro Theou" ===
It was the lead single and released on 21 June 1999 and became a massive hit. Filming took place in advance of the album's release with the album cover art being shot at the same time. Due to her pregnancy, Katy's body is not visible for the duration of the video.

=== "Agkires" ===
"Agkires" was the second single and released on 2 August 1999. It was filmed on a Greek island and became one of the summer hits. Similar to the first single, Katy's body was hidden.

=== "Aponomi Dikaiosinis" ===
"Aponomi Dikaiosinis" was the third and last single and released on 27 September 1999. It's the only music video from the album to show Katy's body.

== Credits ==
Credits adapted from liner notes.

=== Personnel ===
- Ilias Achladiotis – programming, keyboards (track 4)
- Haris Andreadis – orchestration (track 4)
- Mohamend Arafa – percussion (tracks 3, 5, 7, 9, 13)
- Michalis Armagos – guitars (tracks 1, 6, 10, 11, 12, 14)
- Hakan Bingolou – oud (track 3) • säz (tracks 3, 7)
- Giannis Bithikotsis – bouzouki (tracks 2, 6, 9, 12) • cura (tracks 1, 2, 6, 10, 12, 14) • baglama (tracks 1, 2, 6, 12, 14)
- Akis Diximos – second vocal (tracks 6, 10)
- Rania Dizikiriki, Stelios Goulielmos, Anna Ioannidou – backing vocals (tracks 3, 5, 7, 9, 13)
- Kostas Doxas, Katerina Kiriakou, Alex Panayi – backing vocals (tracks 1, 11, 14)
- Sarantis Dramalis, Dimitris Gkouzgkounis, Panagiotis Sachsanidis – trumpet (track 3)
- Vasilis Gkinos – orchestration, programming, keyboards (tracks 2, 3, 5, 7, 8, 9, 13)
- Kiriakos Gkouventas – violin (tracks 7, 8, 9) • viola (track 8)
- Nikolas Gkouzgkounis, Anastasis Tsaknakis – trombone (track 3)
- Antonis Gounaris – guitars (tracks 2, 5, 8, 9, 13)
- Giannis Kapoulas – oud (tracks 11, 14) • säz (tracks 1, 11) • cümbüş (track 10)
- Giorgos Kostoglou – bass (tracks 2, 5, 7, 8, 9)
- Antonis Koulouris – drums (tracks 2, 5, 7, 8, 9)
- Manos Koutsaggelidis – kanun (tracks 5, 13)
- Phedon Lionoudakis – accordion (tracks 8, 9)
- Stelios Malliaris – second vocal (track 8)
- Christos Nikolopoulos – bouzouki, baglama (track 8)
- Vasilis Nikolopoulos – programming (tracks 1, 6, 10, 11, 12, 14)
- Antonis Remos – second vocal (track 2)
- Giorgos Roilos – percussion (tracks 1, 11)
- Paschalis Terzis – second vocal (tracks 12)
- Giorgos Theofanous – orchestration, keyboards (tracks 1, 6, 10, 11, 12, 14)
- Philippos Tseberoulis – oboe, soprano saxophone (track 4)
- Thanasis Vasilopoulos – clarinet, ney (tracks 3, 7) • flute (track 2)

=== Production ===
- Ioanna Aggelaki, Natasa Aggelaki – art direction
- Daniel Anast – photographer
- Takis Argiriou (111 studio) – sound engineer (tracks 2, 3, 4, 5, 7, 8, 9, 13)
- Thodoris Chrisanthopoulos (Fabelsound) – digital mastering
- Giannis Chronopoulos (Sierra studio) – vocal engineer (all tracks) • sound engineer (tracks 2, 3, 4, 5, 7, 8, 9, 13) • mix engineer (track 4)
- Giannis Doulamis – production manager
- Al Giga – styling
- Vasilis Gkinos (Gallery studio) – sound engineer (tracks 2, 3, 4, 5, 7, 8, 9, 13)
- Giannis Ioannidis (Digital Press Hellas) – mastering
- Vangelis Lappas (Sierra studio) – sound engineer (tracks 2, 3, 4, 5, 7, 8, 9, 13) • mix engineer (all tracks except 4)
- Giannis Michailidis – grooming
- Vasilis Nikolopoulos (Power Music studio) – sound engineer (tracks 1, 6, 10, 11, 12, 14)
- Katerina Sideridou – cover processing

== Charts ==
Chart	Providers	Peak Position	Certification
Greek Albums Chart	IFPI	1	Platinum
Cypriot Album Chart	Musical Paradise Top 10	2	Platinum

== Accolades ==
Doro Theou received an award at the Pop Corn Music Awards 1999:

- Best Album Cover
