= Kostas Tournas =

Greek singer (born 1949)

Kostas Tournas Κώστας Τουρνάς
- Born: Kostas Tournas; 23 September 1949 (age 77); Tripoli, Greece
- Genre: Greek rock
- Occupations: Singer, composer, guitarist, multi-instrumentalist
- Years active: 1967–present

Kostas Tournas (Greek: Κώστας Τουρνάς; born 23 September 1949) is one of the pioneers of modern Greek rock. He is a singer and composer of many hits in the '70s including Ti Na Mas Kanei I Nychta (What Can The Night Do For Us).

He shaped Greek rock music in the late '60s along with groups such as Socrates Drank the Conium, Peloma Bokiou, Nostradamos and Hexadactylos. He is also one of the founder members of the pioneering Greek rock group Poll along with Robert Williams.

Tournas along with Robert Williams and Stavros Logarides, as members of the legendary rock group Poll, created a music wave which was met with great success and took the music scene of Athens during the junta by storm. Their music resonated with the young and created songs which still remain in the history of Greek rock.

His 1972 progressive-psychedelic solo album, rock opera Aperanta Horafia (Infinite Fields), is considered a landmark of Greek rock and an act of resistance against the junta which ruled Greece at the time.

His songs often deal with Space and Time and one of his greatest hits from his album Astroneira (Star Dreams) was I Michani Tou Chronou (The Time Machine). He participated in the rock opera Trojan War composed by Yannis Petritsis along with Robert Williams and other Greek rock stars.

His anti-war protest song Anthrope Αgapa (Human, Love) as a member of Poll along with his solo albums Astroneira and Kyries kai Kyrioi were among the biggest hits of the '70s in Greece. Tournas was included in the electoral list of New Democracy in 2011. In 2013, he was a candidate of New Democracy for the European Parliament.

== Early life ==
Tournas was born in 1949, in Tripoli, Greece. As a child he enjoyed singing Greek melodies of the era. Due to financial difficulties, his family eventually moved to Kypseli, Athens. Tournas finished high school and in his spare time he used to play the guitar, which he'd received as present from his mother.

== Music career ==
In Athens, Tournas worked at various music clubs in playing Italian and French songs which he did not enjoy very much because he found them melodramatic. He was a Beatles fan to the point of having watched Α Hard Day's Night seven times in a single day. He also enjoyed listening to the Rolling Stones and Crosby, Stills, Nash & Young.

=== Poll ===
After returning from his army duty, Tournas founded Poll, one of the first rock groups of Greece, along with his childhood friend Robert Williams and Stavros Logarides. The motto of their group was Poll is love and their logo was the stylised outline of a dove. In a concert with Poll, in their first ever photographic event, at Pedion tou Areos, Tournas played guitar, sitar, flute and the piano. Poll started appearing at the popular Athens music club Kyttaro presenting folk rock songs influenced from the hippie culture which soon became very popular among the youth.

Their first album Anthrope... (Human...) included the song Anthrope agapa (Human, Love) which became a huge success and came in a fashionable gunny sack. Anthrope agapa is considered the first protest anti-war song in the history of Greek rock. Other hits from the same album included Poll Means Love, Έλα Ήλιε μου (Come My Sun), Στην Πηγή μια Κοπέλα (A Girl at the Fountain), Αετοί (Eagles) and Η Γενιά μας (Our Generation).

It was followed by their second album Lefko (White) which was influenced by the Beatles' White Album. Poll dissolved soon after their second album. The group broke up because Tournas wanted to pursue a solo career. When asked about the reasons of the breakup Tournas commented that sometimes a group is like a partnership and when the reasons for its existence are no longer there then it breaks up.

=== Later career ===
Following Poll, in 1972 Tournas composed Aperanta Horafia, a 40-minute psychedelic pop-rock symphonic work which he presented with the group Ruth. The work featured the participation of a symphonic orchestra. Tournas was inspired by Beethoven for this work. Aperanta Horafia sold just 2500 records at the time. During the subsequent 39 years, multiple editions of the record have sold-out. On the 40th anniversary of the album, Tournas performed a concert featuring the work with the participation of the Orchestra of Modern Music of ERT under the direction of Stathis Soulis at the theatre of the cultural centre Hellenic World.

Tournas' career took off in the '70s and in subsequent decades he produced several other hits. In 1973, influenced by David Bowie's Ziggy Stardust, he created Astronira (Star Dreams). His songs often deal with Space and Time and one of his greatest hits from his album Astronira (Star Dreams) was I Michani Tou Chronou (The Time Machine), a song about how Time, like a machine, changes everyone and everything. He participated in the rock opera Trojan War composed by Yannis Petritsis along with Robert Williams and other Greek stars such as Marina, Giorgos Moutsios and Charlie.

He appeared also in several television broadcasts and live performances in Greece and Cyprus. In 1973, Tournas along with Greek rock-pop idols Elpida, Marina, and Robert Williams gave a performance at the Open-Air Theatre in Cyprus which attracted thousands. The Dance orchestra of ERT also performed at the same event. His night concerts have been praised as "reviving a whole era" with his songs which "have written a part of the pop-history" of Greece from the era of Poll to the present day. His Italo disco album Fantasia 85 has been praised by an Italian music critic.

== Guitars ==
Over the years Tournas used the following guitars.

- Takamine
- Gibson SG
- Fender Stratocaster

== Discography ==
This is a partial list of Tournas' discography:

Date	Album title	Record company
1972	Απέραντα Χωράφια (Endless Fields)	Polydor
1973	Αστρόνειρα (Star Dreams)	Polydor
1974	Κυρίες & Κύριοι (Ladies & Gentlemen)	Polydor
1975	Λευκά Φτερά (White Wings)	Polydor
1976	Στο Σινεμά (At the Cinema)	Polydor
1978	Αγαπημένη (Beloved)	Polydor
1980	Τώρα (Now)	Polydor
1981	Χωρίς Λόγια (Wiτhout Words)	Polydor
1982	Λίγη Αμαρτία (A Little Sin)	Polydor
1983	Υπερβολές (Exaggerations)	Polydor
1985	Πορτραίτο (Portrait) [compilation]	Polydor
1986	Κλισέ (Cliché)	Polydor
1988	Παιχνίδι (Game)	Polydor
1990	Αλητείες (Bumming Around)	RCA, BMG
1993	Κάτω Απ' Την Ακρόπολη (Below Acropolis)	RCA, BMG
1993	Ντουέτα (Duets)	RCA, BMG
1996	Δεν Λέει (Doesn't Say)	RCA, BMG
1998	Κώστας Τουρνάς – Χρήστος Δάντης – Live (Kostas Tournas – Christos Dantes – Live)	RCA, BMG
2000	Κλέβει Ο Καιρός (Time Steals)	RCA, BMG
