= Arhizo Polemo =

Arhizo Polemo Αρχίζω Πόλεμο

Studio album by Katy Garbi
- Released: May 13, 1996
- Recorded: Sierra studio
- Genres: Pop, Modern Laika
- Length: 43:33
- Language: Greek
- Labels: Sony Music Greece; Columbia
- Producer: Giannis Doulamis

Katy Garbi chronology
Atofio Hrisafi (1994)	Arhizo Polemo; Αρχίζω Πόλεμο (1996)	Evaisthisies (1997)

Singles from Arhizo Polemo
- 1. "Arhizo Polemo" Released: May 1996; 2. "Tha Melagholiso" Released: June 1996; 3. "Mia Fora Ki Enan Kairo" Released: August 1996; 4. "Hamena" Released: September 1996; 5. "Perasmena Xehasmena" Released: October 1996; 6. "1,000,000 Nihtes" Released: December 1996; 7. "Apo Do Kai Pio Pera" Released: February 1997; 8. "Ftou Xelefteria" Released: March 1997; 9. "Agio Kalokairi" Released: May 1997

Arhizo Polemo (Greek: Αρχίζω Πόλεμο; English: I Declare War) is the seventh studio album by Greek singer, Katy Garbi. It was released on 13 May 1996 by Sony Music Greece and received triple-platinum certification, selling over 180,000 units. The majority of the album was written by Phoebus with contributions by Andreas Mexas, Charis Andreadis, Giannis Doxas and Smaroula Maragkoudaki. It was ranked among the best-selling Greek albums of 1996 and is Garbi's best-selingr album, containing many of her most successful songs like "Tha Melagholiso", "Mia Fora Ki Enan Kairo", "Hamena" and "Perasmena Xehasmena".

== Track listing ==
No.	Title	Lyrics	Music	Length
1.	"Tha Melagholiso" (Θα Μελαγχολήσω; I'll Be Sad)	Phoebus	Phoebus	3:28
2.	"Mia Fora Ki Enan Kairo" (Μια Φορά Κι Έναν Καιρό; Once Upon A Time)	Phoebus	Phoebus	3:40
3.	"Arhizo Polemo" (Αρχίζω Πόλεμο; I Declare War)	Giannis Doxas	Phoebus	3:06
4.	"Hamena" (Χαμένα; Lost)	Phoebus	Phoebus	3:50
5.	"Perasmena Xehasmena" (Περασμένα Ξεχασμένα; Forgotten Past)	Giannis Doxas	Charis Andreadis	3:45
6.	"Apo Do Kai Pio Pera" (Από Δω Και Πιο Πέρα; From Here To Beyond)	Giannis Doxas	Phoebus	3:49
7.	"Ftou Xelefteria (ft. The Children's Choir Of Spiros Labrou)" (Φτου Ξελευτερία; We're Free)	Giannis Doxas	Phoebus	3:30
8.	"Ftaime" (Φταίμε; It's Our Fault)	Phoebus	Phoebus	3:33
9.	"1,000,000 Nihtes" (1.000.000 Νύχτες; 1,000,000 Nights)	Smaroula Maragkoudaki	Andreas Mexas	3:46
10.	"Argises" (Άργησες; You're Late)	Smaroula Maragkoudaki	Andreas Mexas	3:29
11.	"De M' Agapises Pote Sou" (Δε Μ' Αγάπησες Ποτέ Σου; You've Never Loved Me)	Phoebus	Phoebus	2:58
12.	"Agio Kalokairi" (Άγιο Καλοκαίρι; Holy Summer)	Giannis Doxas	Phoebus	4:39
Total length:				43:33

== Singles ==
The success of the album released nine of twelve songs becoming singles to radio stations with music videos, except the songs "Ftou Xelefteria" and "Agio Kalokairi", and gained massive airplay.

1. "Arhizo Polemo" (Αρχίζω Πόλεμο; I Declare War / Director: Giorgos Gkavalos)
2. "Tha Melagholiso" (Θα Μελαγχολήσω; I'll Be Sad) (Director: Giorgos Sofoulis)
3. "Mia Fora Ki Enan Kairo" (Μια Φορά Κι Έναν Καιρό; Once Upon A Time / Director: Giorgos Gavalos)
4. "Hamena" (Χαμένα; Lost / Director: Giorgos Sofoulis)
5. "Perasmena Xehasmena" (Περασμένα Ξεχασμένα; Forgotten Past / Director: Giorgos Sofoulis)
6. "1,000,000 Nihtes" (1.000.000 Νύχτες; 1,000,000 Nights / Director: Giorgos Sofoulis)
7. "Apo Do Kai Pio Pera" (Από Δω Και Πιο Πέρα; From Here To Beyond / Director: Vaggelis Kalaitzis)
8. "Ftou Xelefteria" (Φτου Ξελευτερία; We're Free)
9. "Agio Kalokairi" (Άγιο Καλοκαίρι; Holy Summer)

== Credits ==
Credits adapted from liner notes.

=== Personnel ===
- Haris Andreadis – orchestration (tracks 4, 5, 9, 10)
- Aggelos Avgeris – second vocal (tracks 6, 12)
- Giannis Barakos – bass (tracks 3, 12)
- Giannis Bithikotsis – bouzouki (3, 4, 9, 10, 11) • cura (tracks 1, 2, 3, 11) • baglama (tracks 1, 3, 4, 10, 12)
- Charis Chalkitis, Anna Ioannidou, Sandy Politi – backing vocals (tracks 4, 5)
- Giorgos Chatzopoulos – guitars (tracks 9, 10)
- Nikos Chatzopoulos – violin (tracks 2, 9, 12)
- Rania Dizikiriki, Marianta Pieridi, Eva Tselidou – backing vocals (tracks 1, 2)
- Antonis Gounaris – guitars (all tracks except 9 & 10) • oud (track 10) • cümbüş (tracks 1, 2, 8)
- Yiotis Kiourtsoglou – bass (tracks 1, 6, 8, 11)
- Elli Kokkinou, Dionisis Schinas – backing vocals (track 8)
- Dimitris Kokotas – backing vocals (tracks 1, 8)
- Phedon Lionoudakis – accordion (tracks 1, 5, 11, 12)
- Andreas Mouzakis – drums (tracks 1, 3, 6, 8, 11, 12)
- Thimios Papadopoulos – clarinet (track 12)
- Phoebus – orchestration, programming, keyboards (tracks 1, 2, 3, 6, 7, 8, 11, 12) • backing vocals (tracks 1, 8)
- Orestis Plakidis – programming, keyboards (tracks 4, 5, 9, 10)
- Antonis Remos – backing vocals (tracks 1, 8) • second vocal (track 10)
- Giorgos Roilos – percussion (tracks 1, 6, 7, 8, 11, 12)

=== Production ===
- Makis Achladiotis (Sierra studio) – sound engineer (tracks 9, 10)
- Giannis Aggelakis – make up
- Giannis Doulamis – production manager
- Dis Graphs – art direction
- Giannis Ioannidis (Digital Press Hellas) – mastering
- Giannis Michailidis – hair styling
- Vaggelis Papadopoulos (Sierra studio) – sound engineer (tracks 1, 2, 3, 6, 7, 8, 11, 12)
- Panagiotis Petronikolos (Sierra studio) – sound engineer (tracks 1, 2, 3, 4, 5, 6, 7, 8, 11, 12) • mix engineer (all tracks)
- Tasos Vrettos – photographer

== Charts ==
Chart	Providers	Peak Position	Certification
Greek Albums Chart	IFPI	1	3×Platinum
Cypriot Album Chart	Musical Paradise Top 10	1	2×Platinum

== Accolades ==
Arhizo Polemo gained four awards at the Pop Corn Music Awards 1996:

- Best Album of the Year
- Best Composition (Tha Melagholiso)
- Best Lyrics (Arhizo Polemo)
- Best Folk Dance Track (Perasmena Xehasmena)
