= Gialia Karfia =

1990 studio album by Greek singer Katy Garbi

Gialia Karfia Γυαλιά καρφιά

Studio album by Katy Garbi
- Released: 3 May 1990
- Recorded: Digital studio
- Genre: Pop, Dance
- Length: 33:56
- Language: Greek
- Label: CBS Records Greece; Sony Music Greece; Columbia
- Producer: Giannis Doulamis

Katy Garbi chronology
Prova (1989)	Gialia Karfia; Γυαλιά καρφιά (1990)	Endalma Silepseos (1991)

Singles from Gialia karfia
- 1. "Gialia karfia" Released: May 1990; 2. "To tzini" Released: June 1990; 3. "Fantasmataki" Released: August 1990; 4. "Psemataki" Released: October 1990

Gialia karfia (Greek: Γυαλιά καρφιά; English: Smashed) is the second studio album by Greek artist Katy Garbi. It was released on 3 May 1990 by CBS Records, selling over 20,000 units. It includes her first hits "To tzini", "Gialia karfia" and "Fantasmataki", the latter two released also as music videos for further promotion by the local television networks. It was released on CD for the first time in 1992, under the Columbia label as a joint package with 1989's Prova. In 1996, the album was re-released in a separate edition, as a part of the OK! Budget Price series Sony Music Greece launched at the time.

== Track listing ==
No.	Title	Lyrics	Music	Length
1.	"To tzini" (Το τζίνι; The Genie)	Giannis Nikolaou	Giannis Nikolaou	3:52
2.	"Gialia karfia" (Γυαλιά καρφιά; Smashed)	Anastasia Moutsatsou	Ilias Achladiotis	3:24
3.	"Enohos" (Ένοχος; Guilty)	Giannis Nikolaou	Giannis Nikolaou	3:17
4.	"Psemataki" (Ψεματάκι; Little lie)	Giannis Nikolaou	Giannis Nikolaou	3:48
5.	"Se skeftomai pantou" (Σε σκέφτομαι παντού; I think of you everywhere)	Giannis Nikolaou	Giannis Nikolaou	2:44
6.	"Mi me paideveis" (Μη με παιδεύεις; Don't tease me)	Giannis Nikolaou	Giannis Nikolaou	2:55
7.	"Fantasmataki" (Φαντασματάκι; Little ghost)	Nikos Doulamis	Nikos Doulamis	4:01
8.	"Posa xereis" (Πόσα ξέρεις; How much you know)	Giannis Karalis	Giannis Karalis	3:32
9.	"Zo sta oneira sou" (Ζω στα όνειρα σου; I live in your dreams)	Charis Papadopoulos	Charis Papadopoulos	3:36
10.	"Tha trelathoume" (Θα τρελαθούμε; We'll go crazy)	Giannis Nikolaou	Giannis Nikolaou; Vaggelis Spanakakis	2:46
Total length:				33:56

== Singles ==
The following singles were officially released to radio stations and made into music videos, except the song "Psemataki".

1. "Gialia karfia"
2. "To tzini"
3. "Fantasmataki"
4. "Psemataki"

== Credits ==
Credits adapted from liner notes.

=== Personnel ===
- Ilias Achladiotis – orchestration, programming, keyboards (2)
- Katerina Adamantidou – backing vocals (1, 2, 3, 5, 6, 7, 10)
- Charis Andreadis – orchestration, keyboards (all except 2)
- Dimitris Barbagalas – guitars (all tracks)
- Dimitris Bellos – programming (all except 2)
- Stelios Goulielmos – backing vocals (1, 2, 3, 5, 6, 7, 10)
- Giannis Nikolaou – second vocal (1)
- Sandy Politi – backing vocals (1, 2, 3, 5, 6, 7, 10)
- Nikos Saragoudas – oud (6)
- Rigas Sariziotis – saxophone (3, 7, 10)
- Eva Tselidou – backing vocals (1, 2, 3, 5, 6, 7, 10)
- Stelios Zahariou – percussion (6)

=== Production ===
- Sergios Charatzas – assistant engineer
- Achilleas Charitos – hair styling, make up
- Ntinos Diamantopoulos – photographer
- Giannis Doulamis – executive producer
- Kostas Giannakopoulos – recording, mixing
- Giannis Ioannidis, Dimitris Nikolaou (Digital Press Hellas) – mastering
- Mike Nikolatos – styling
