= Apo Kardias =

Apo Kardias Από Καρδιάς

Greatest hits album by Katy Garbi
- Released: 23 March 2013
- Recorded: 1991–2012
- Genre: Contemporary laika, pop, pop rock
- Language: Greek
- Label: Sony Music Greece/Columbia; Front Seat
- Producer: Giannis Doxas

Katy Garbi chronology
Pazl (2011)	Apo Kardias; Από Καρδιάς (2013)	Buona Vita (2013)

Commercial Release Cover
- Espresso Release Cover

Singles from Apo Kardias
- 1. "Pio Pano Apo Sena" Released: 14 December 2012

Apo Kardias (Greek: Από Καρδιάς; English: From the Heart) is the 1st official Greatest Hits compilation album by Greek recording artist Katy Garbi and 19th album overall. The album was first released as a covermount with 'Espresso' magazine on the 23 March 2013. The album was commercially released by Sony Music Greece on April 18, 2013.
Described on the front cover as "Apo Kardias / Best 2013", the album contains 36 tracks, with 34 being some of Garbi's greatest hits and the remaining 2 being new unreleased tracks. New material includes "Zontanos Ouranos" featuring accordionist Zoi Tyganouria, and radio single Pio Pano Apo Sena.

== Release ==
In December 2012, Sony Music Greece released a new single by Garbi titled Pio Pano Apo Sena under the Front Seat imprint. Garbi stated that the single would be one of two new tracks from an upcoming 'Best Of' compilation album to be released by Sony Music in the coming weeks.

The premiere of track "Zontanos Ouranos" featuring accordionist Zoi Tyganouria also preceded the official release of the album, as it was performed by Garbi and Tyganouria several times during their performances at Casablanca Music Hall. It was written by Tyganourgia and it was first performed as a duet between the two artists two years prior at Technopolis - Gkazi.

The album was first released on March 23, 2013 as a covermount with 'Espresso' news and entertainment magazine. The campaign distributed the double CD album throughout Greece as a bonus when purchasing the magazine, as is now common with many new releases throughout Greece. The album was commercially released by Sony Music Greece on April 18, 2013, almost one month after its covermount release, making it the 18th discographic release by Garbi under the label.

== Track list ==
The official commercial release of the compilation album contains 38 tracks, featuring two new tracks on the second disk. The remaining album contains songs from Katy's past studio albums except her three first uncertified works, her 1998 Christmas album Hristougenna Me Tin Katy and 2011 album Pazl which is her only album not released under the Sony Music Entertainment license, but under Universal Music Group. Although no tracks from 2008 album Kainourgia Ego are included in the commercial release, the two radio singles contained in the album are included in the covermount release with Espresso newspaper. Contrary to this, two singles from 2006 album Pos Allazei O Kairos are included in the commercial release although not included in the covermount edition.

The two-disc covermount edition released as a part of Espresso newspaper contains 34 tracks, featuring the two previously unreleased tracks on the first disk. The remaining album differs from the commercial release by omitting any tracks from 2006 album Pos Allazei O Kairos as well as several other tracks, yet including the two singles from 2008 album Kainourgia Ego. Specific to the covermount edition, the second CD contains only tracks composed by Phoebus.

Disc One: Commercial Release
No.	Title	Lyrics	Music	Original album	Length
1.	"Ksypoliti Horevo"	Kostas Tournas	Kostas Tournas	Atofio Hrysafi	4:13
2.	"Hamena"	Phoebus	Phoebus	Arhizo Polemo	3:49
3.	"Mi Me Sygkrineis"	Kostas Tournas	Kostas Tournas	Atofio Hrysafi	4:02
4.	"Tou Feggariou Anapnoes"	Tasoula Thomaidou	Spiros Pazios	Tou Feggariou Anapnoes	3:03
5.	"Evaisthisies"	Phoebus	Phoebus	Evaisthisies	4:18
6.	"Pes To M'Ena Fili"	Natalia Germanou	Nikos Terzis	Tou Feggariou Anapnoes	3:45
7.	"Atofio Hrysafi"	Phoebus	Phoebus	Atofio Hrysafi	3:25
8.	"Arhizo Polemo"	Giannis Doksas	Phoebus	Arhizo Polemo	3:07
9.	"Viastika"	Antonis Pappas	Nikos Terzis	Apla Ta Pragmata	4:57
10.	"Apo Do Kai Pio Pera"	Giannis Doxas	Phoebus	Arhizo Polemo	3:46
11.	"O Ilios Pou Egine Vrohi"	Phoebus	Phoebus	Atofio Hrysafi	3:46
12.	"Os Ton Paradeiso"	Phoebus	Phoebus	Os Ton Paradeiso	4:43
13.	"Asimfonia Haraktiron" (ft. Antonis Remos)	Phoebus	Phoebus	Evaisthisies	3:46
14.	"O Kafes"	Phoebus	Phoebus	Os Ton Paradeiso	4:43
15.	"Opou Fisaei O Anemos"	Lazaros Kominos	Panagiotis Apostolidis	Os Ton Paradeiso	2:57
16.	"O Antras Tis Zois Mou" (ft. Fivos Delivorias)	Fivos Delivorias	Fivos Delivorias	Halia	3:11
17.	"Aponomi Dikaiosinis"	Yioula Georgiou	Giorgos Theofanous	Doro Theou	3:29
18.	"Ta Paidika Sou Matia"	Pegasus	Pegasus	Pos Allazei O Kairos	3:33
19.	"Pos Allazei O Kairos"	Pegasus	Pegasus	Pos Allazei O Kairos	4:07

Disc Two: Commercial Release
No.	Title	Lyrics	Music	Original album	Length
1.	"Pio Pano Apo Sena"	Thanos Papanicolaou	Vasilis Gabrilidis	Previously Unreleased	3:58
2.	"Zontanos Ouranos"	Zoi Tiganourgia	Zoi Tiganourgia	Previously Unreleased	3:44
3.	"Esena Mono"	Nikos Gritsis	Dimitris Kontopoulos	Emmones Idees	2:56
4.	"Epitelous" (ft. Natasa Theodoridou)	Phoebus	Phoebus	To Kati	5:02
5.	"Perasmena Ksehasmena"	Giannis Doxas	Charis Andreadis	Arhizo Polemo	3:47
6.	"Tha Melaholiso"	Phoebus	Phoebus	Arhizo Polemo	3:26
7.	"Ierosilia"	Phoebus	Phoebus	Evaisthisies	3:40
8.	"Zisame" (ft. Dionysis Shoinas)	Phoebus	Phoebus	To Kati	4:05
9.	"I Patrida Mou" (ft. Antonis Vardis)	Phoebus	Phoebus	Evaisthisies	4:07
10.	"Eho Sta Matia Ourano"	Vasilis Giannopoulos	Christos Dantis	Eho Sta Matia Ourano	4:20
11.	"Doro Theou"	Yioula Georgiou	Giorgos Theofanous	Doro Theou	3:56
12.	"Agio Kalokeri"	Giannis Doxas	Phoebus	Arhizo Polemo	4:37
13.	"Ti Theloune Ta Matia Sou"	Giannis Kalpouzos	Spiros Kontakis	Apla Ta Pragmata	4:14
14.	"Apozimiosi"	Phoebus	Phoebus	Evaisthisies	4:42
15.	"Diskolos Erotas"	Eleni Gianatsoulia	Christos Nikolopoulos	Doro Theou	4:04
16.	"Den Eipa Psemata Pote"	Kostas Tournas	Kostas Tournas	Apla Ta Pragmata	3:49
17.	"Apsiha Pragmata"	Smaroula Maragoudaki	Spiros Georgiou	Emmones Idees	4:06
18.	"Otan Se Hreiazomai"	Antonis Pappas	Nikos Terzis	Apla Ta Pragmata	4:05
19.	"To Lathos Mou"	Phoebus	Phoebus	To Kati	4:33

Disc One: Espresso Covermount
No.	Title	Lyrics	Music	Original album	Length
1.	"Pio Pano Apo Sena"	Thanos Papanicolaou	Vasilis Gabrilidis	Previously unreleased	3:58
2.	"Zontanos Ouranos"	Zoi Tiganourgia	Zoi Tiganourgia	Previously unreleased	3:44
3.	"Ksypoliti Horevo"	Kostas Tournas	Kostas Tournas	Atofio Hrysafi	4:13
4.	"Mi Me Sygkrineis"	Kostas Tournas	Kostas Tournas	Atofio Hrysafi	4:02
5.	"Perasmena Ksehasmena"	Giannis Doksas	Charis Andreadis	Arhizo Polemo	3:47
6.	"Tou Feggariou Anapnoes"	Tasoula Thomaidou	Spiros Pazios	Tou Feggariou Anapnoes	3:03
7.	"Esena Mono"	Nikos Gritsis	Dimitris Kontopoulos	Emmones Idees	2:56
8.	"Pes To M'Ena Fili"	Natalia Germanou	Nikos Terzis	Tou Feggariou Anapnoes	3:45
9.	"Viastika"	Antonis Pappas	Nikos Terzis	Apla Ta Pragmata	4:57
10.	"O Kafes"	Giannis Doxas	Orestis Plakidis	Os Ton Paradeiso	4:17
11.	"Afto Aksizo"	GML	Nikos Antipas	Kainourgia Ego	3:16
12.	"Opou Fisaei O Anemos"	Lazaros Komninos	Panagiotis Apostolidis	Os Ton Paradeiso	2:57
13.	"Eho Sta Matia Ourano" (Tessera Pota)	Vasilis Giannopoulos	Christos Dantis	Eho Sta Matia Ourano	4:20
14.	"Ti Theloune Ta Matia Sou" (ft. Exis)	Giannis Kalpouzos	Spiros Kontakis	Apla Ta Pragmata	4:14
15.	"Doro Theou"	Yioula Georgiou	Giorgos Theofanous	Doro Theou	3:56
16.	"Kainourgia Ego" (ft. Thirio)	GML, Thirio	Nikos Antipas	Kainourgia Ego	3:40
17.	"O Antras Tis Zois Mou" (ft. Fivos Delivorias)	Fivos Delivorias	Fivos Delivorias	Halia	3:11
18.	"Aponomi Dikaiosinis"	Yioula Georgiou	Giorgos Theofanous	Doro Theou	3:29
19.	"Apsiha Pragmata"	Smaroula Maragoudaki	Spiros Georgiou	Emmones Idees	4:06

Disc Two: Espresso Covermount
No.	Title	Lyrics	Music	Original album	Length
1.	"Evaisthisies"	Phoebus	Phoebus	Evaisthisies	4:18
2.	"Hamena"	Phoebus	Phoebus	Arhizo Polemo	3:49
3.	"Atofio Hrysafi"	Phoebus	Phoebus	Atofio Hrysafi	3:25
4.	"Epitelous" (ft. Natasa Theodoridou)	Phoebus	Phoebus	To Kati	5:02
5.	"Tha Melaholiso"	Phoebus	Phoebus	Arhizo Polemo	3:26
6.	"Arhizo Polemo"	Giannis Doksas	Phoebus	Arhizo Polemo	3:07
7.	"Ierosilia"	Phoebus	Phoebus	Evaisthisies	3:40
8.	"Zisame" (ft. Dionysis Shoinas)	Phoebus	Phoebus	To Kati	4:05
9.	"I Patrida Mou" (ft. Antonis Vardis)	Phoebus	Phoebus	Evaisthisies	4:07
10.	"Agio Kalokeri"	Giannis Doxas	Phoebus	Arhizo Polemo	4:37
11.	"Apozimiosi"	Phoebus	Phoebus	Evaisthisies	4:42
12.	"Os ton Paradeiso"	Phoebus	Phoebus	Os Ton Paradeiso	4:43
13.	"Apo do kai Pio Pera"	Giannis Doksas	Phoebus	Arhizo Polemo	3:46
14.	"O Ilios Pou Egine Vrohi"	Phoebus	Phoebus	Atofio Hrysafi	3:46
15.	"Asimfonia Haraktiron" (ft. Antonis Remos)	Phoebus	Phoebus	Evaisthisies	3:46

== Singles ==
The following single was officially released to radio stations.

"Pio Pano Apo Sena"

"Pio Pano Apo Esena" is the first radio single of the greatest hits album, and one of the two new tracks contained in the compilation. The release marks a return for Garbi to the laïko style of Greek commercial music, with the track being written by Vasilis Gabrilidis, lyricist Thanos Papanicolaou in a collaboration with Giannis Doxas, all notable for commercial Greek music. Garbi has previously worked with Doxas on albums such as Os Ton Paradeiso, Arhizo Polemo and most recently Emmones Idees in 2003. It was officially released through Sony Music Greece's imprint Front Seat via the label's youtube channel on December 14, 2012. The track premiered on December 10 on Sfera Radio, during an interview with Garbi held for the station's 4th year celebration of 'Greek Music Week'. The single debuted at 72 on the Airplay Top 100 powered by Media Inspector, and has since peaked at 14.

== Charts ==
"Apo Kardias" debuted on the Top 75 Combined album charts at number four. This is Garbi's highest debut into the Official Album Charts since 2008 album Kainourgia Ego which peaked the charts at number one. The album remained on the chart for three consecutive weeks. In July 2019, six years after its release, "Apo Kardias" re-entered the IFPI Top 75 Album Charts at 19, remaining in the top 20 for another two weeks.

Chart	Provider	Peak position
Top-75 Album Sales Chart	IFPI	4

== Release history ==
Region	Date	Label	Format	Version
Greece	23 March 2013	Sony Music	CD	Covermount Edition (Espresso)
Greece	18 April 2013	Sony Music	CD	Commercial Edition (Retail)
Cyprus	18 April 2013	Sony Music	CD	Commercial Edition (Retail)
