= Buona Vita (Katy Garbi album) =

Studio album by Katy Garbi
- Released: 8 June 2013
- Genre: Italian pop, laïko
- Language: Italian, Greek
- Label: EGEA Music
- Producer: Katy Garbi, Alberto Zeppieri

Katy Garbi chronology
Apo Kardias (2013)	Buona Vita (2013)	Perierges Meres (2013)

Singles from Buona Vita
- 1. "Buona Vita" Released: 27 July 2012; 2. "Ti Sento" Released: 3 June 2013

Buona Vita (English: Life is Good) is the first Italian-language and the eighteenth studio album by the Greek recording artist Katy Garbi. The album was released in Italy on 8 June 2013 by EGEA Music, with releases in various European locations thereafter. The album was produced by the Italian producer Alberto Zeppieri.

The album contains 12 newly recorded tracks, all Italian-language remakes of Garbi's hits, as well as some well-known Italian tracks, including five duets with well-known Italian artists such as Ornella Vanoni and Carlo Marrale.

== Background ==
Zeppieri heard Garbi's song "Esena Mono" and became interested in her voice, as well as many of her hits written by Greek composers such as Phoebus, Nikos Antipas, and Peagasus. After contacting Garbi, he proposed a challenge in which he would select tracks from her Greek repertoire and adapt them to Italian lyrics and musical taste, which she would re-record in Italian. Garbi accepted and traveled to Milan to begin the recording of the adapted material.

== Singles ==
"Buona Vita" (English: "Life is Good") was the first single from the album, released on 27 July 2012, before the album's release. It is a remake of a well-known Italian song with the same title, and is a duet with the Italian artist Ornella Vanoni. It has been adapted to include both Italian and Greek lyrics, with both Vanoni and Garbi singing in both languages. The single was released exclusively on Love Radio 97.5 (Greece), in an interview with Garbi, gaining airplay on the station, which commonly plays a foreign repertoire. The original version of the song has been used in a global campaign by the United Nations Organization to recognise children around the world.

Garbi in the music video for "Ti Sento".

""Ti Sento" (English: "I Hear You") was officially released as a music video and radio single on 3 June 2013 to coincide with the album's Italian release. It is a remake of the single of the same name by the Italian band Matia Bazaar and is a duet with the Italian artist Carlo Marrale, who was the original composer of the track released in 1986. It has been adapted to include both Italian and Greek lyrics, with both Marrale and Garbi singing in both languages. A remixed version, "Ti sento (Extended Version) [Luca Zeta vs Sander Remix]", was digitally released on 11 July via iTunes.

== Music videos ==
A music video for "Ti Sento" was released on 3 June 2013 and was directed by Viki Velopoulou. It was designed to showcase the Aegean Sea and the scenery of islands including Santorini and Rodes. It follows Garbi strolling down the iconic white stairs found in the Cyclades islands, overlooking a stunning view of the Thiran circular archipelago surrounded by the Aegean Sea. The video uses underwater filming techniques scenes where Garbi is swimming with a dolphin and also caressing an underwater Herma. The video was filmed during August 2012 with filming locations in Rodes, Dodecanese and Santorini, Cyclades.

== Track listing ==
1. "Scolpiscimi nel fango" (I sculpt in the mud) – originally the song "Syneffa" from the album Pazl (2011), music by Nikos Antypas – 3:21
2. "Ti sento" (Se niotho) (I hear you (I fell you)) (Duet with Carlo Marrale) – originally the song "Ti sento" by Matia Bazar from the album Melancholia (1986), written by Salvatore Stellita, Sergio Cossu and Carlo Marrale – 3:33
3. "A te soltanto" (Just for you) – originally the song "Esena mono" from the album Emmones Idees (2003), music by Dimitris Kontopoulos – 3:33
4. "Egoista" (Selfish) – originally the song "Ego" from the album Pazl (2011), music by Nikos Antypas – 3:10
5. "Buona vita" (Zalizoi) (Good life (Amazing)) (Duet with Ornella Vanoni) – originally the song "Buona vita" by Ornella Vanoni from the album Una bellissima ragazza (2007), written by Teofilo Chantre, Alberto Zeppieri and Ornella Vanoni" – 5:03
6. "La malinconia" (The melancholy) (feat. Tinkara) – originally the song "Tha melagholiso" from the album Arhizo Polemo (1996), music by Phoebus – 3:23
7. "Se questo fosse un film" (If all that was a film) (Duet with Toto Cutugno) – originally the song "Ola sta zitisa" from the album Pazl (2011), music by Nikos Antypas – 3:52
8. "Un'altra me" (Another me) – originally the song "Kainourgia ego" from the album Kainourgia Ego (2008), music by Nikos Antypas – 3:51
9. "Anime" (Anime) (Duet with Maurizio Lauzi) – originally the song "Pos allazei o kairos" from the album Pos Allazei O Kairos (2006), music by Pegasus – 4:02
10. "Plastica" (Plastic) – originally the song "Viastika" from the album Apla Ta Pragmata (2001), music by Antonis Pappas – 2:47
11. "Bugie" (Lies) – originally the song "Psemata" from the album Pazl (2011), music by Nikos Antypas – 3:17
12. "Perduta" (Lost) (feat. the Choir of Ruda) – originally the song "Hamena" from the album Arhizo Polemo (1996), music by Phoebus – 4:20

== Release history ==
Region	Date	Format	Label
Greece	28 May 2013	Digital download	EGEA Music
Cyprus	28 May 2013	Digital download	EGEA Music
Italy	8 June 2013	CD	EGEA Music
