= 18 Hronia Live =

18 Hronia Live 18 Χρόνια Live

Live album by Katy Garbi
- Released: December 5, 2007
- Genres: Pop, modern laika, dance
- Label: Sony BMG Greece/Columbia
- Producer: Possidonas Giannopoulos

Katy Garbi chronology
Pos Allazei O Kairos (2006)	18 Hronia Live; 18 Χρόνια Live (2007)	Kainouria Ego (2008)

Singles from 18 Hronia Live
- 1. "Mi Ta Filas Ta Matia Mou"; 2. "18 Hronia Live Medley"; 3. "Se Sfalma Epeses Kardia Mou"; 4. "I Proti Mas Fora"

18 Hronia Live (Greek: 18 Χρόνια Live; English: 18 Years Live), also referred to as 18XL, is a live album by popular Greek singer Katy Garbi recorded and released in 2007 by Sony BMG Greece. The album is her first live album; a double disk compilation of songs performed during a special charity concert held in Egaleo, Greece.

A Gold certification was awarded on March 11, 2008 at an elaborate party, whose attendance included many of Garbi's longtime collaborators and fellow singers.

== Release ==
The initial paperback album cover was originally detailed to incorporate a metallic gold title situated upon a full cover collage of images throughout Garbi's solo career. However, upon the album's release the decision was made to change the title font colour to scarlet, increasing the contrast between collage and title. The first release on December 5 also had the collage continue along the back cover, and an inner booklet containing song titles, various photos and a double paged message from Katy addressing her fans, thanking her collaborators and explaining her song choices.

December 31 brought the release of the reissue of 18 Hronia Live, after a second decision was passed by Sony BMG to include a track listing at the back of the album cover.

== Track listing ==
=== Disc 1 ===
No.	Title	English translation	Length
1.	"Esena Mono" (Εσένα μόνο)	Only you	4:00
2.	"Taheia" (Ταχεία)	Express train	3:39
3.	"Mi Ta Filas Ta Matia Mou" (Μην τα φιλάς τα μάτια μου)	Don't kiss my eyes	2:24
4.	"Sou 'ho Etoimi Sygnomi" (Σου 'χω έτοιμη συγγνώμη)	I have an apology ready for you	0:57
5.	"Min Me Sygkrineis" (Μην με συγκρίνεις)	Do not compare me	1:46
6.	"Pira Ap' Ti Nioti Hromata" (Πήρα απ' τη νιότη χρώματα)	I took colours from the youth	1:14
7.	"Ksenychtisa Stin Porta Sou" (Ξενύχτησα στην πόρτα σου)	I stayed up all night at your door	1:57
8.	"Alitaki Mou" (Αλητάκι μου)	My naughty one	1:36
9.	"Tora Tetoia Tha Leme" (Τώρα τέτοια θα λέμε)	Now we say these things	2:32
10.	"Ta Deilina" (Τα δειλινά)	The sunsets	1:44
11.	"Hamena" (Χαμένα)	Wasted	2:19
12.	"Epitelous" (Επιτέλους)	Finally	1:00
13.	"Varethika Varethika" (Βαρέθηκα βαρέθηκα)	I'm fed up I'm fed up	1:50
14.	"Ola Ta Katalavaino" (Όλα τα καταλαβαίνω)	I understand everything	2:18
15.	"Apo Sena Tha Pao" (Απο Σενα Θα Παω)	Of Thee I'm going	1:12
16.	"Yordios Desmos" (Γόρδιος δεσμός)	Gordian Knot	2:14
17.	"Ma Ti Leo" (Μα τι λέω)	What am I saying	1:02
18.	"Ksipoliti Horevo (Kante Akri)" (Ξυπόλητη χορεύω (Κάντε άκρη))	I dance barefoot (Move aside)	0:51
19.	"Pes To M' Ena Fili" (Πες το μ' ένα φιλί)	Say it with a kiss	0:37
20.	"Agkyres (Iste Hendek Iste Deve)Elazığ dik halay" (Άγκυρες)	Anchors	1:09
21.	"Kai Na 'moun Dakry Sou" (Και να 'μουν δάκρυ σου)	And if I were a tear of yours	1:37
22.	"S' Agapo Akoma" (Σ' αγαπάω ακόμα)	I still love you	2:24
23.	"Agori Mou" (Αγόρι μου)	My boy	1:27
24.	"Kane Kati Na Haso To Treno" (Κάνε κάτι να χάσω το τρένο)	Do something so I can miss the train	1:49
25.	"To Lathos Mou" (Το λάθος μου)	My mistake	2:10
26.	"Apozimiosi" (Αποζημίωση)	Compensation	0:55
27.	"Tilefonitis" (Τηλεφωνητής)	Answerphone	3;31
28.	"I Proti Mas Fora" (Η πρώτη μας φορά)	Our first time	4:15

=== Disc 2 ===
No.	Title	English translation	Length
1.	"Anavallo" (Αναβάλλω)	I postpone	3:28
2.	"Naytis Vgike Stin Steria" (Ναύτης βγήκε στη στεριά)	A sailor came onto shore	1:54
3.	"Perasmena Ksehasmena" (Περασμένα ξεχασμένα)	Let bygones be bygones	1:32
4.	"Evaisthisies" (Ευαισθησίες)	Sensibilities	0:56
5.	"Anthropoi Eimaste" (Άνθρωποι είμαστε)	We are people	1:18
6.	"Aftoi Pou Menoun Ki Aftoi Pou Fevgoun" (Αυτοί που μένουν κι αυτοί που φεύγουν)	Those who stay and those who leave	1:22
7.	"Min Tou Milate Tou Paidiou" (Μην του μιλάτε του παιδιού)	Don't speak to the child	1:09
8.	"I Douleia Kanei Tous Antres" (Η δουλειά κάνει τους άντρες)	Work is what makes men	2:03
9.	"M' Afises San Poli" (Μ' άφησες σαν πόλη)	You left me as a city	2:15
10.	"O Gyalinos Kosmos" (Ο γυάλινος κόσμος)	The glass world	0:57
11.	"Ego Eimai Aitos" (Εγώ είμαι αητός)	I am him	2:06
12.	"Tha Melagholiso" (Θα μελαγχολήσω)	I will become melancholic	1:30
13.	"Doro Theou" (Δώρο Θεού)	Gift of God	0:51
14.	"Sto Parathyri Provale" (Στο παραθύρι πρόβαλε)	Appear at the window	1:35
15.	"Mia Melachrini" (Μια μελαχροινή)	A brunette	1:22
16.	"To Erinaki" (Το ερηνάκι)		1:01
17.	"O Argaleios" (Ο αργαλειός)	The loom	1:13
18.	"Kathe Iliovasilema" (Κάθε ηλιοβασίλεμα)	Every sunset	2:56
19.	"O Antras Tis Zois Mou" (Ο άντρας της ζωής μου)	The man of my life	0:55
20.	"Eho Sta Matia Ourano" (Έχω στα μάτια ουρανό)	I have the sky in my eyes	1:29
21.	"Se Sfalma Epeses Kardia Mou" (Σε σφάλμα έπεσες καρδιά μου)	You fell into a fault, my heart	3:14
22.	"Pire Fotia I Kalamaria" (Πήρε φωτιά η Καλαμαριά)	Kalamaria caught fire	2:46
23.	"Selimpeis" (Σελίμπεης)		1:15
24.	"Na 'san Ta Niata Dyo Fores" (Να 'σαν τα νειάτα δυο φορές)	If youth could last twice	1:18
25.	"Lianohortaroudia" (Λιανοχορταρούδια)		2:11
26.	"Dyo Nihtes" (Δυο νύχτες)	Two nights	1:58
27.	"Alloimono – Alloimono" (Αλλοίμονο – αλλοίμονο)	Alas – Alas	1:01
28.	"Mou Leipeis Esi" (Μου λείπεις εσύ)	I Miss You	1:42
29.	"Nomizeis" (Νομίζεις)	You think	1:25
30.	"Ego Na Deis" (Εγώ να δεις)	You should see just how I	1:49
31.	"Viastika" (Βιάστηκα)	I was in a hurry	1:29
32.	"Pos Allazei O Kairos" (Πως αλλάζει ο καιρός)	How the Weather Changes	2:22
33.	"Yia Pou To 'vales Kardia Mou" (Για που το 'βαλες καρδιά μου)	Where are you off to, my heart	2:31

== Singles ==
The following singles were officially released to radio stations. Additional songs such as, "Esena Mono live ", "Taxeia live", and "Sou 'ho Etimi Sygnomilive", despite not having been released as singles, managed to gain radio airplay and internet release.

"Mi Ta Fila Ta Matia Sou"

The single was the first released to all radio stations as the primary single of the album. It is a live cover of Vicky Moscholiou's 1970's hit, and as Katy stated in her Mad Tv interview in 2008, she really admires Moscholiou as one of Greece's founding artists. It was announced as the leading single by the album's producer - Poseidonas Giannopoulos - at the beginning of his radio program on Greece's "Sfera FM" during which he aired the track's first official broadcast. A music video was not produced as the concert's location was not appropriately fit for video recording.

"18 Hronia Live Medley" Xypoliti Horevo/Pes'to M'Ena Fili/Agkires

A short medley of three simultaneous and corresponding live tracks was announced as the follow-up single. The three tracks were all previously released hit singles from Garbi's studio albums Atofio Hrysafi, Tou Feggariou Anapnoes and Doro Theou. The single's release was denounced and halted as a result of its corresponding music videos's cancellation, although the three tracks did gain airplay separately.
Music Video
It was announced on the artist's official website that renowned director and Garbi's long-time collaborator 'Giorgos Kavalas' would be creating the album's first music video. His concept, due to the unfortunate lack of video footage from the concert, was to create a dedication to Garbi's 18 years of live performances (reflecting the album's theme) through archive video material, however it was decided that this video would not go ahead as it Sony was already focusing on Garbi's next discographical move and also due to the album's limited success on the charts.

"Se Sfalma Epeses Kardia Mou"

Se Sfalma Epeses Kardia Mou was officially released as the next single of the Garbi's live album. It was announced and released on her myspace. This song is also a cover of a well-known Greek song.

"I Proti Mas Fora"

The strong ballad 'I Proti Mas Fora' was originally released by Giannis Kotsiras in 1999; Katy Garbi's live rendition is found as the last track on the first disk. The single gained a moderate amount of airplay in Athens. The audience can be heard singing along with Garbi in the final chorus, with a quite tense but solemn atmospheric vibe.

== Charts ==
Chart	Peak position
Greek Albums Chart	18
Cypriot Album Chart	4
