= Remix Plus =

EP by Katy Garbi
- Released: May 2002
- Genre: Pop, modern laika, dance
- Length: 22:21
- Label: Sony Music Greece/Columbia

Katy Garbi chronology
Apla Ta Pragmata (2001)	Remix Plus (2002)	Hit Mix (2002)

Katy Garbi EP chronology
Ti Theloune Ta Matia Sou (2000)	Remix Plus (2002)	Mia Kardia (2002)

Singles from Remix Plus
- 1. "Thelo Apopse Na Horepso" Released: May 2002; 2. "Kragion (Remix)" Released: December 2002

Remix Plus is an EP of remixed hits by Greek singer Katy Garbi. It was released in Greece and Cyprus by Sony Music Greece in May 2002.

== Background ==
The EP includes the album version of "Thelo Apopse Na Horepso" . At the time of the EPs release, the track was being promoted and released as the third single of Apla Ta Pragmata, and so in a crossover promotion "Thelo Apopse Na Horepso" was included as the fourth track.

== Track listing ==
1. "Krayon" (Remix) (Κραγιόν; Lipstick) – 4:03
2. "Otan Se Hreiazomai" (Remix) (Όταν σε χρειάζομαι; When I need you) – 4:22
3. "Apla Ta Pragmata" (Remix) (Απλά τα πράγματα; Things are simple) – 4:05
4. "Thelo Apopse Na Horepso" (Θέλω απόψε να χορεψω; I want to dance tonight) – 3:29
5. "Krayon" (Extended Version) (Κραγιόν; Lipstick) – 6:22

== Singles ==
"Thelo Apopse Na Horepso"

"Thelo Apopse Na Horepso", composed by Dimitris Zemkos, was the precursor to the remix EP, and also the third single of the album Apla Ta Pragmata.

"Kragion (Remix)"

The short version remix of the track "Kragion" was used to promote the EPs release in early 2003.

== Chart performance ==
Chart	Peak position
Greek Albums Chart	11

- Note: EPs chart as CD singles in Greece.
