= Tzini (song) =

"Tzini (Radio Mix)"

Single by Katy Garbi
- Released: August 11, 2008
- Genre: Pop, dance
- Label: Sony Music Greece/Columbia
- Songwriter: Giannis Nikolaou

Katy Garbi minor singles chronology
"Isovios Desmos" (2006)	"Tzini (Radio Mix)" (2008)	"Afto Aksizo" (2008)

"Tzini (Radio Mix)" is a single released by Greek singer Katy Garbi. The song was released to radios in July 2008, before its release as a digital download on August 11, 2008. It serves as Garbi's second track to be released as a digital download after her 2006 duet "Isovios Desmos" from the album Pos Allazei O Kairos, which was also the first Greek song to be released in such a way.
The song is a dance remix of her Giannis Nikolaou written song "Tzini" from her 1990 album Gyalia Karfia. The song was remixed by fellow singers Giorgos Alkaios and Dionysis Schinas.

== Personnel ==
- Dionysis Skhinas – remixing
- Giorgos Alkaios – remixing
- Katerina Garbi – vocals
