= Perierges Meres =

Perierges Meres Περίεργες Μέρες

Studio album by Katy Garbi
- Released: December 10, 2013
- Recorded: Track Factory Recording studio
- Genre: Pop, Modern Laika
- Length: 55:39
- Language: Greek
- Label: Front Seat Records
- Producer: Giannis Doxas

Katy Garbi chronology
Buona Vita (2013)	Perierges Meres; Περίεργες Μέρες (2013)	Spase Tous Deiktes (2017)

Singles from Perierges Meres
- 1. "Pio Pano Apo Sena" Released: 14 December 2012; 2. "Stin Adeia Sou Karekla" Released: 23 September 2013; 3. "Anemodarmena Ipsi" Released: 20 November 2013; 4. "Ena Gelio Tha Foreso [Koukla]" Released: 4 December 2013; 5. "Psefti" Released: 23 January 2014; 6. "Pame Finale" Released: 7 May 2014; 7. "Logia Meli" Released: 6 August 2014

Perierges Meres (Greek: Περίεργες Μέρες; English: Strange Days) is the nineteenth studio album by popular Greek artist, Katy Garbi. It was released on 10 December 2013 by Front Seat Records, a Minos EMI label, and received platinum certification, selling over 20,000 units. The album marked the singer's comeback in the night life of Athens and her return to laiko music style. On 26 January 2014, the album was released as a covermount along with the newspaper Proto Thema. In March 2014 it was announced that the album has reached gold status. In November 2014, the album was re-released as a covermount that it has reached platinum status.

== Singles ==
Perierges Μeres produced three singles prior its release and contain two more from Garbi's two latest albums.

"Pio Pano Apo Sena"

"Pio Pano Apo Esena" is the first single (music: Vasilis Gavriilidis, lyrics: Thanos Papanikolaou) which marks a return for Garbi to the laïko style of Greek commercial music, in a collaboration with Giannis Doxas, all notable for commercial Greek music. Garbi has previously worked with Giannis Doxas on albums such as Os Ton Paradeiso, Arhizo Polemo and most recently Emmones Idees in 2003. It was officially released through Sony Music Greece's imprint Front Seat via the label's YouTube channel on 14 December 2012. The song premiered on 10 December on Sfera Radio, during an interview with Garbi held for the station's 4th year celebration of "Greek Music Week". The single debuted at 72 on the Airplay Top 100 powered by Media Inspector, and has since peaked at 14.

"Stin Adeia Sou Karekla"

In July 2013, Garbi announced a new collaboration with Vasilis Gavriilidis and Thanos Papanikolaou on a new single. On 23 September 2013, Garbi released the second single titled "Stin Adeia Sou Karekla" for an upcoming album. This song marked a return to her the laika style after two albums that were more concentrated on the alternative Greek genre. The track premiered exclusively via Lampsi FM 92.3 and it gained a lot of airplay.

"Anemodarmena Ipsi"

The third single of the album is the song "Anemodarmena Ipsi" which was chosen as album's lead single. The creators of the song are Giorgos Sabanis in music (singer and musician with many success the last years in Greece) and Eleni Giannatsoulia in lyrics (lyricist and an old collaborator of Katy's with many hits in Greek discography for two and more decades). The single was released on 20 November 2013 via Katy's official account on YouTube and two days later, on 22 November 2013 was released its official videoclip on Katy's official YouTube account too. Only on the first day of its release, "Anemodarmena Ipsi" achieved more than 24.000 views on YouTube and peaked at number one on Greek i-tunes. The video clip was directed by Victoria Vellopoulou.

The airplay success of the single placed it at number 20 on the MediaInspector Top 200 Airplay tracks of 2015 and number 125 the following year, making it one of Garbi's most successful tracks of the decade.

"Ena Gelio Tha Foreso"

This is the fourth single of the album that was released on 4 December 2013 via Front Seat (Katy's label) YouTube account only as a promotional single in contrast to the other singles. The song is written by Tasos Panagis (music) and Nikos Gritsis (lyrics), both old collaborators of Katy's.

"Psefti"

Katy's fifth single was produced via voting on Katy's official page by fans. The song is written by Giorgos Sabanis (music) and Nikos Gritsis (lyrics). The results of the voting were announced on 23 December 2013 with a video where Katy is singing live the song. The single was released on 23 January 2014 and the same day was announced that a video clip is preparing. On 20 March 2014, the video clip was released via Katy's official YouTube channel. The video is the first act of a sequel with another videoclip which is to be released for the song "Pame Finale".

"Pame Finale"

Katy's sixth single is the song "Pame Finale". The song is written by Giorgos Papadopoulos (music) and Vicky Gerothodorou with Giannis Doxas (lyrics). On 23 January 2014, it was announced that the song will be the next single of the album. On 3 February 2014, it was announced that a mash-up video clip is preparing too (with the song "Psefti"). Finally, the song was released as a radio single on 7 May 2014 and the video clip was released on 2 June 2014 via Katy's Vevo Channel on YouTube.

"Logia Meli"

The seventh single of the album is the song "Logia Meli", a cover of "Betigy Osady". The music is written by Ayman Bahgat Amr and Greek lyrics are written by Katy's producer and lyricist Giannis Doxas. The single was released as a remix version by Spiros Metaxas named Aegean Blue remix via both Katy's and her label's YouTube account on 6 August 2014.

== Track listing ==
No.	Title	Lyrics	Music	Notes	Length
1.	"Anemodarmena Ipsi" (Ανεμοδαρμένα Ύψη; Wuthering Heights)	Eleni Giannatsoulia	Giorgos Sabanis		4:02
2.	"Psefti" (Ψεύτη; Liar)	Nikos Gritsis	Giorgos Sabanis		3:20
3.	"Stin Adeia Sou Karekla" (Στην Άδεια Σου Καρέκλα; In Your Empty Chair)	Thanos Papanikolaou	Vasilis Gavriilidis		3:38
4.	"Perierges Meres" (Περίεργες Μέρες; Strange Days)	Nikos Gritsis	Giorgos Sabanis		3:45
5.	"Ena Gelio Tha Foreso [Koukla]" (Ένα Γέλιο Θα Φορέσω [Κούκλα]; I'll Wear A Laugh [Beautiful])	Nikos Gritsis	Tasos Panagis		3:17
6.	"Deixe Mou (ft. Giorgos Papadopoulos)" (Δείξε Μου; Show Me)	Vaggelis Konstantinidis	Giorgos Papadopoulos		3:25
7.	"Ti Me Koitas" (Τι Με Κοιτάς; Why Do You Look At Me?)	Nikos Gritsis	Giorgos Sabanis		3:34
8.	"To Ligaki" (Το Λιγάκι; The "Few")	Vaggelis Konstantinidis	Giorgos Sabanis		3:49
9.	"Den Ehei Allo Gkremo" (Δεν Έχει Άλλο Γκρεμό; There's No Another Cliff)	Vicky Gerothodorou	Giorgos Papadopoulos		3:34
10.	"Logia Meli (Betigy Osady)" (Λόγια Μέλι; Words Like Honey)	Ayman Bahgat Amar	Mhd. Yehia	Greek version of the song "Betigy Osadi" of the Egyptian singer Amr Mostafa. The Greek lyrics were written by Giannis Doxas.	3:14
11.	"Pame Finale" (Πάμε Φινάλε; Let's Finish)	Vicky Gerothodorou, Giannis Doxas	Giorgos Papadopoulos		3:38
12.	"Pio Pano Apo Sena" (Πιο Πάνω Από Σένα; Above You)	Thanos Papanikolaou	Vasilis Gavriilidis	Previously released on Katy's greatest hits album, Apo Kardias.	3:58
13.	"Ierosilia (ft. Nikiforos & REC)" (Ιεροσυλία; Sacrilege)	Phoebus	Phoebus	MAD Video Music Awards 2013 version. Originally released in the album Evaisthisies.	3:37
14.	"Zontanos Ouranos" (Ζωντανός Ουρανός; Live sky)	Zoi Triganouria	Zoi Triganouria	Previously released on Katy's greatest hits album, Apo Kardias.	3:45
15.	"Buona Vita (duet with Ornella Vanoni)" (Good life)	Teofilo Chantre, Pacifico and Ornella Vanoni	Teofilo Chantre, Pacifico and Ornella Vanoni	Previously released on Garbi's Italian album, Buona Vita.	5:00
Total length:					55:39

== Credits ==
=== Personnel ===
- Dimitris Antoniadis – drums (2, 7)
- Panagiotis Apostolidis – bouzouki, baglama (12)
- Ilias Argiropoulos – piano (14)
- Alexandros Arkadopoulos – clarinet, ney (4)
- Panagiotis Brakoulias – orchestration, programming, keyboards (6) • guitars (1, 2, 4, 6, 7, 8, 9, 10, 11) • bouzouki (2, 7) • cura (1, 4, 6, 8, 9) • baglama (7, 9) • oud (1, 4, 8) • backing vocals (10)
- Akis Diximos – second vocal (2, 7) • backing vocals (8, 10)
- Vasilis Gavriilidis – orchestration, programming, keyboards (3, 12)
- Stelios Generalis – drums (14)
- Antonis Gounaris – guitars (3, 12) • cura, baglama, cümbüş (3)
- Giannis Grigoriou – bass (2, 3, 7, 12)
- Pantelis Konstantinidis – bouzouki (14)
- Tasos Liberis – percussion (6)
- Dimitris Liolios – second vocal (5)
- Spiros Mazis – bass (14)
- Telis Michael – guitars (14)
- Alkis Misirlis – drums (3, 12)
- Tasos Panagis – orchestration, programming, keyboards (5)
- Giorgos Papadopoulos – backing vocals (9, 11)
- Dimitris Paraskevopoulos – accordion (3)
- Elena Patroklou – backing vocals (3, 12)
- Christos Pertsinidis – guitars (5)
- Giorgos Sousounis – violin (6)
- Panagiotis Stergiou – bouzouki, baglama (5)
- Zoi Tiganouria – orchestration, accordion (14)
- Leonidas Tzitzos – orchestration, programming, keyboards (1, 2, 3, 4, 7, 8, 9, 10, 11)

=== Production ===
- Stamatis Arapakis – art direction
- Aris Binis (Vox studio) – sound engineer, mix engineer (3, 5)
- Panagiotis Brakoulias (Track Factory Recording studio) – sound engineer, mix engineer (1, 2, 4, 6, 7, 8, 9, 10, 11)
- Tasos Chamosfakidis (Workshop studio) – sound engineer, mix engineer (12)
- Achilleas Charitos – make up
- Alexandros Chrisidis (Sierra studio) – sound engineer, mix engineer (14)
- Giannis Doxas – production manager
- Giannis Gkiouras (New Sound studio) – mastering (12)
- Petros Paraschis – artwork
- Paul Stefanidis (Viking Lounge studio) – mastering (1, 2, 3, 4, 5, 6, 7, 8, 9, 10, 11, 14)
- Stefanos Vasilakis – hair styling
- Victoria Vellopoulou – photographer

== Chart performance ==
Perierges Meres debuted on the IFPI Top 75 Album Charts at number 7. It retained the same position the following week. On its sixth week the album rose to a new peak position at number 5. On the iTunes Greek chart, the album peaked at number 1 on its very first day of release. After weeks on the charts, it was certified platinum by IFPI.

Chart	Peak position	Certification
Greece Top 20	1	Platinum

== Awards ==
Perierges Meres earned Garbi an award nomination at the 2015 MAD Video Music Awards (Greece). Garbi performed a duet of "Anemodarmena Ipsi" alongside Stan at the awards ceremony in June 2015.

Year	Event	Nominee/Work	Award	Result
2015	MAD Video Music Awards	Katy Garbi	Best Female Adult	Nominated
