= Pop Corn Music Awards 2000 =

Pop Corn Music Awards of 2000
- Awarded for: Votes by readers of Greek music publication Pop Corn and viewers of Mega Channel
- Date: 2001
- Location: Club Fever (Athens)
- Country: Greece
- Hosted by: Maria Bakodimou & Fotis Sergopoulos
- Most awards: Anna Vissi (5)
- Most nominations: Anna Vissi (8)

Television/radio coverage
- Network: Mega Channel

The 10th Annual Pop Corn Music Awards of 2000, at the Club Fever, in Athens, Greece. The awards recognized the most popular artists and albums in Greece from the year 2000 as voted by Greek music publication Pop Corn. The event was hosted by Maria Mpakodimou & Fotis Sergopoulos in the 2001. The Pop Corn Music Awards were discontinued in 2002.

== Performances ==
| Artist(s) | Song(s) |
|---|---|
| Michalis Hatzigiannis | Mono Sta Oneira; Den Eho Hrono |
| Thodoris Ferris | "Mono Logia" "Kai Olo Halage To Amaxi" |
| Imiskoumbria | "Piretos To Savvatovrado" |
| One | "I Agkalia Sou" |
| Sakis Rouvas | "Let it Be" "Blue Suede Shoes "Blue" "Lady" "Anteksa (remix)" "Let's Get Loud" |
| Anna Vissi | "Kravgi" "Horis To Moro Mou" "Agapi Ipervoliki" |

== Winners and nominees ==
| Best Video Clip | Best Breakthrough Artist | |
|---|---|---|
| Anna Vissi – "Agapi Ipervoliki" (G. Gavalos); Antonis Remos – "Meine" (D. Nassis); Lambis Livieratos – "To Koritsi Tou Mai" (K. Kapetanidis); Sakis Rouvas – "Se Thelo San Trelos" (N. Soulis); Giannis Vardis – "Monaxia" (D. Sotas) | Mihalis Hatzigiannis; Despina Olympiou; Haris Varthakouris; Antique; Thodoris Ferris | |
| Best Hip Hop Group | Best Group | |
| Imiskoumbria; FFC; Goin' Through; Terror X Crew | One; Ekeinos+Ekeinos; Exis; Mple; Antique | |
Best Entehno Song
Mihalis Hatzigiannis – "I Titli Tou Telous"; Giannis Vardis – "Monaxia"; Iro – "Etsi Ime Ego"; Anastasia Moutsatsou & Marina Skiadaresi – "Poso Se Thelo"; Eleni Tsaligopoulou – "Tou Erota Simadi"
| | Album of the Year | Song of the Year |
Despina Vandi – Profities; Katy Garbi – To Kati; Natasa Theodoridou – Tha Miliso Pali Me T' Asteria; Yannis Ploutarchos – Ipirhan Orki; Antonis Remos – Pali Ap'Tin Arhi
Anna Vissi – "Agapi Ipervoliki"; Despina Vandi – "Sta Dosa Ola"; Katy Garbi – "To Kati"; Antonis Remos – "Meine"; Sakis Rouvas – "Anteksa"
| | Best Male Vocals | Best Female Vocals |
| Sakis Rouvas – "Se Thelo San Trelos"; Yannis Ploutarchos – "Fisaei Poli"; Antonis Remos – "Meine"; Notis Sfakianakis – "Agapi Ti Dyskolo Pragma; Mihalis Hatzigiannis – "Mono Sta Oneira" | Anna Vissi – "Afti Ti Fora"; Despina Vandi – "Sta Dosa Ola"; Katy Garbi – "To Lathos Mou"; Evridiki – "Gia Mena"; Natasa Theodoridou – "An Iparhei Paradisos" | |
| Best Male Performance | Best Female Performance | |
| Mihalis Hatzigiannis; One; Yannis Ploutarchos; Antonis Remos; Notis Sfakianakis | Anna Vissi; Despina Vandi; Evridiki; Katy Garbi; Natasa Theodoridou | |
| Best Laiko Dance Song | Best Duet/Collaboration | |
| Despina Vandi – "Apapa"; Natasa Theodoridou – "Diplo Paihnidi"; Vasilis Karras – "Ti Tha Kanis"; Nikos Kourkoulis – "Tosa Dilina"; Yannis Ploutarchos – "Ipirhan Orkoi" | Katy Garbi feat. Natasa Theodoridou – "Epitelous"; Evridiki & Stelios Rokkos – "Miso Feggara"; Mando & Sertab – "Ask/Fos"; Nikos Karvelas & Anna Vissi – "Ola Einai Entaksi"; Antonis Remos & Tania Nasibian – "I Agapi Einai Elefantas" | |
Best Dance Pop Song
Katy Garbi – "To Kati"; Antique – "Mera Me Ti Mera"; Anna Vissi – "Agapi Ipervoliki"; Antonis Remos – "Fly With Me/Meine"; Triantafillos – "Krata Ta Ola"
| Male Artist of the Year | Female Artist of the Year | |
| Notis Sfakianakis; Yannis Ploutarchos; Antonis Remos; Sakis Rouvas; Stelios Rokkos | Anna Vissi; Katy Garbi; Despina Vandi; Evridiki; Natasa Theodoridou | |
International
| Best Group | Backstreet Boys | |
| Best Male Artist | Ricky Martin | |
| Best Female Artist | Madonna | |
| Best Breakthrough Artist | Craig David | |
| Best Alternative Video Clip | 3 Doors Down - "Kryptonite (3 Doors Down song)" | |
| Best Album | Madonna - "Music" | |
| Best Dance Pop Video Clip | Ricky Martin - "She Bangs" | |
| Best Video Clip | Madonna - "Music" | |
