= Katy Garbi =

Greek singer (born 1961)

- Καίτη Γαρμπή
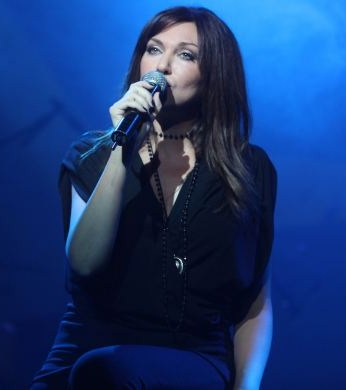
- Garbi performing at Polis Studio in 2013
- Born: Katerina Garbi; 8 June 1961 (age 65); Athens, Greece
- Occupation: Singer
- Years active: 1977–present
- Known for: Music Art
- Spouse: Dionysis Schinas (m. 1997)
- Children: 1
- Musical career
- Genres: Laïko; pop; folk; éntekhno
- Instruments: Vocals
- Labels: Universal Music Greece; Minos EMI; Panik Records; Sony Music
- Website: www.kaitigarbi.com.gr Katy Garbi's signature

Katerina "Katy" Garbi (Greek: Κατερίνα "Καίτη" Γαρμπή, pronounced [kateˈrina ˈceti ɣarˈbi]; born 8 June 1961) is a Greek singer. Her career has spanned over 35 years with over 2 million records sold in Greece and abroad. Garbi's discography is marked by several multi-platinum releases, including Arhizo Polemo (1996) and Evaisthisies (1997), two of the best-selling albums of the decade. Garbi represented Greece in the annual Eurovision Song Contest in 1993 with the song "Ellada, chora tou fotos", taking ninth place. She later struck her biggest commercial success with To Kati (2000) in terms of unit sales. Over the years, Garbi has won 11 Pop Corn Music Awards, including three for Album of the Year, and one Arion Music Award. On 14 March 2010, Alpha TV ranked her among the top-certified female artists in Greece's phonographic era (since 1960).

== Early life ==
Katy Garbi began her singing career with her younger sister Liana, as the "Garbi Sisters", in the summer of 1977, when she was just 16 years old and Liana just 13. Due to their age, their father was against their work as singers, but he did not want to stand in the way of the future that he felt their talent offered them. They are most remembered for the backing vocals they provided at Yannis Floriniotis's performances in the early eighties.

== Career ==
=== Early solo career ===
Breaking away from the duo with her sister Liana, Garbi recorded her first solo song "Sain Trope". Her official debut in discography came in 1987, when she appeared as one of the artists on a new compilation album called Ta Deka Dekaria alongside other new singers including Manto, Polina, Sophia Vossou and Laurentis Mahairitsas. In addition to "Sain Trope", early contributions also included a duet with Kostas Haritodiplomenos titled "Glyka".

With the success of the first album, the second volume was released in 1989 which featured Garbi in two new songs titled "Ah, Afto Mou Aresei" and "Zo Na S'Agapo". These early songs grabbed the attention of Greek music executives, and led her to her first record contract with CBS Records Greece, paving the way for her first studio album in 1989.

=== 1989–1993: The beginning and Eurovision ===
Two years after her recorded music debut, Garbi released her debut personal album titled Prova (English: Rehearsal) in 1989. In 1990 and 1991 she released her second and third studio albums: Gyalia Karfia (English: Glass and nails) and Entalma Silepseos (English: Arrest warrant), respectively. Both albums fared well and allowed her to rise in the ranks of the Greek music scene.

By 1992, Garbi released her fourth album Tou Feggariou Anapnoes (English: The Breaths of the Moon). Garbi took on a more pop approach to her music, faring well with audience as she would gain her first certification when the album achieved gold certification by IFPI.

In 1993, she accepted the offer to participate in the Eurovision Song Contest 1993 with the song "Ellada, chora tou fotos", where she stirred up controversy in the Greek media due to the slit blue dress she wore. Garbi's performance placed Greece 9th with 64 points. Garbi holds the Eurovision record for the individual singer with the longest camera close-up. During her performance, the camera showed a focused close-up of Garbi, fixed for 43 seconds before cutting to a different angle.

=== 1994–1997: Further success ===
Following her highly publicized participation at Eurovision, Garbi's popularity began to climb, releasing albums that reached platinum certification, including platinum album Os Ton Paradeiso (English: Until paradise) and the double-platinum album Atofio Hrysafi (English: Pure gold) in 1994. During that time, Garbi released a duet with her then boyfriend Dionisis Shinas. Years later he would make a marriage proposal live in front of a national TV audience while promoting the song on Mega Channel's show Bravo hosted by Roula Koromila.

In 1996, Garbi released Arhizo Polemo (English: I'm starting a war), which was eventually certified three times platinum. In 1997, Garbi followed up her success by releasing her eighth studio album titled Evaisthisies (English: Sensitivities) which also reached triple-platinum status. The album included a duet with rising singer Antonis Remos on the song "Asimfonia Haraktiron" (English: Personality Clash). That same year, Garbi also performed at Radio City Music Hall on 9 May 1997, becoming the first Greek female artist to do so. From 1994 to 1997, Garbi won eight Pop Corn Greek Music Awards. Her 1994, 1996, and 1997 releases were awarded as the best albums in each year at the Pop Corn Greek Music Awards.

=== 1998–1999: Christmas album and Doro Theou ===
For Christmas 1998, Garbi recorded a Christmas album of popular Christmas carols titled Hristougenna Me Tin Katy (English: Christmas With Katy) all adapted with Greek lyrics by Eleni Giannatsoulia. The album had been a wish by Garbi for many years. Hristouyenna Me Tin Katy is a collaboration with well-known Greek children's choir of Spiros Labros, while the internationally known tenor Konstantinos Paliatsaras is also featured on one track. Since its release in 1998, sales of the album have increased with the coming of each Christmas season. In fact, although it was popular during the time of its release, it was not until 2002 when it gained its gold certification, four years after its release.

1999 saw the release of Garbi's platinum album Doro Theou (English: Gift of God) as a dedication to her newborn baby boy Dimitris. The title track was written in celebration of Garbi and Shina's one year wedding anniversary. Singles from the album included "Doro Theou", "Agkires", and "Aponomi Dikeosinis".

=== 2000–2001: To Kati, Anna Vissi and Ti Theloune Ta Matia Sou ===
In 2000, Garbi released her eleventh studio album titled To Kati (English: That something), a double CD with her greatest hits by Phoebus, but it also included seven new songs, four of which became singles, including a duet with fellow singer Natassa Theodoridou in the song "Epitelous", awarded Best Duet/Collaboration at the Pop Corn Music Awards of 2000. To Kati was certified four times platinum, and remains one of the best selling albums of the 2000s. In the same year, the Greek faction of the Eurovision OGAE submitted "To Kati" to the international OGAE Song Contest. In representing all of Greece with the song, Katy took 5th place with 103 points, behind Sweden, Italy, Turkey and Spain.

After the success of To Kati, Garbi partnered up with fellow Greek singer and friend Anna Vissi for a duet titled "Kalitera I Dio Mas" on Vissi's album Kravgi. The song was a massive radio success, with two music videos being made; Version A and Version B, fun videos that saw Garbi and Vissi lightheartedly playing around as friends.For the winter season of 2000–2001, Garbi appeared with Anna Vissi and boyband One at Club Fever.

In December 2000, Garbi released the maxi single "Ti Theloune Ta Matia Sou" which was certified platinum. "Ti Theloune Ta Matia Sou" featured three new songs and two remixes of the title track which was a collaboration with the popular Greek pop rock band Exis. Kostas Tournas wrote one of the B-side tracks called "Kane To Logariasmo".

=== 2001–2003: Apla Ta Pragmata, The Remixes and Emmones Idees ===
In 2001, Garbi released her twelfth studio album titled Apla Ta Pragmata (English: Things are simple), a double CD featuring 31 tracks and produced by Yannis Doulamis. The first CD features songs composed by Nikos Terzis, who also had written Garbi's earlier hit single "Pesto M' Ena Fili" as well as a duet with the young duo Antique titled "Einai Adiko Kai Krima". The album included the hits "Viastika" and "Thelo Apopse Na Horepso". Apla Ta Pragmata was certified double-platinum in Greece and in Cyprus and earned Garbi the Modern Laiko Female Singer of the Year award at the Arion Music Awards.

In 2002, Sony Music released the EP Remix Plus and the non-stop compilation CD titled Katy Garbi Hit Mix.

In late 2002, Garbi released the EP Mia Kardia (English: One Heart), which was certified double-platinum on the Greek Singles Chart. "Mia Kardia" became a hit in Greek clubs, characterized by a mix of sounds including a tsifteteli song, a techno-infused club song, a Hindi inspired song, and a duet with Giorgos Tsalikis.

In 2003, Garbi worked with the group 667 on a song titled "Aeraki" which was included on the group's album. Later on that year Garbi released the album Emmones Idees (English: Obsessive idees); "Na Pernas", "Andres", "Esena Mono", and a duet with Yiannis Vardis titled "Poso Tha Thela" were well received singles from the album. In first for the Greek recording industry, a bonus DVD was released with the album containing the music videos and behind-the-scenes footage from Mia Kardia. Within a week, Emmones Idees had sold over 30,000 units achieving golden certification, heading steadily towards becoming platinum. To celebrate, Sony Music and whisky label Dewar's held an official presentation of the new gold album as well as a multi-platinum award ceremony of Garbi's past albums which had not officially been awarded certification plaques for reaching status sales. The albums and singles awarded were: Mia Kardia (2×Platinum), Apla Ta Pragmata (2×Platinum), Ti Theloune Ta Matia Sou (Platinum), To Kati (4×Platinum), Doro Theou (Gold & Platinum), Hristougenna Me Tin Katy (Gold).

=== 2004–2005: Galazio Kai Lefko and Eho Sta Matia Ourano ===
In 2004, Garbi released her second EP titled Galazio Kai Lefko (English: Blue and white), a title reflecting the national colors of Greece as a dedication to her country. It also featured a new high bass song titled "Katapliktiko" and two remixes of "Esena Mono", which gained airplay and a number one position on the club charts. The "Esena Mono" remixes also gained success in other countries such as Russia, Bulgaria, and Turkey.

In 2005, Garbi released her moderately successful 14th studio album "Eho Sta Matia Ourano" (English: I Have A Sky In My Eyes) which achieved gold certification in Greece and Cyprus. The album was written by Christos Dantis and also featured a duet between the two under the title "Spaciba Baby". Other songs that gained radio airplay included the pop single "Akouse Agori Mou", which Garbi performed at the 2005 Mad Video Music Awards.

That same year Garbi was a judge on the fourth and final installment of the hit talent music show Fame Story, where she presented the song "Isovios Desmos", a duet between her and contestant Stathis Raftopoulos. The song made history as it was the first ever digital download track released in Greece. Later that year Garbi recorded the Greek song "Stohos" composed by popular Turkish singer Nazan Öncel for Planetworks, a dance and electronic label based in Greece, on their album Al Bazaar 3. Her song "Esena Mono" was mixed with the Turkish hit "Leili" by Mokka and became a music video named "Mokka vs. Katy Garbi".

=== 2006–2007: Pos Allazei O Kairos and live album ===
On 23 October 2006, Garbi released her 15th studio album Pos Allazei O Kairos (English: How the weather changes). It was certified gold, with the title track "Pos Allazei O Kairos" making the highest played radio singles of the 2000s.

On 31 August 2007, Garbi held a special charity concert at the Municipal Theatre in Aigaleo, Athens to benefit the victims and families affected by the 2007 Greek forest fires. The concert was recorded and released as Garbi's first live album 18 Hronia Live (English: 18 years live), composed of Laika tracks originally recorded by other artists and various hits from Garbi's discography.

In October 2007, Garbi played the leading role as Athenian mother-in-law "Katy Marini" in three episodes of Alpha TV series "Epta Thanasimes Petheres". Garbi's performance in the series garnered favourable reviews with the television industry.

=== 2008–2009: Kainourgia Ego ===
Garbi embarked on an eight-concert mini-tour in North America along with husband Dionysis Schinas and Christos Pazis. Appearances included Chicago, Los Angeles, Toronto, Astoria, Washington DC, Vancouver, Boston, and Tampa. After her North America tour, Garbi returned to Greece where a party was held in celebration of her 18 years of live performances and to present the respective live album 18 Hronia Live on 11 March 2008.

In July 2008, Garbi released a dance-pop remix of her old song "Tzini" as a digital download. It was first released in 1990 on her album Gyalia Karfia and penned by Giannis Nikolaou. The song was remixed by Giorgos Alkaios and Dionysis Schinas of Friends Music Factory and is her second digital download only single release after "Isovios Desmos" in 2006.

For the winter season of 2008–2009, Garbi began performances with Notis Sfakianakis at Club Enastron, after years of a rumored collaboration. Garbi and Sfakianakis premiered on November 14, 2008, and performed weekly from Thursday to Sunday until around Easter. In mid-2008, it was announced that Garbi was working on songs for a new album, entirely penned by Nikos Antipas. The first single from Garbi's seventeenth studio album, titled Kainourgia Ego (English: A New Me), is "Afto Aksizo", a zeibekiko which was released and performed live at the premier of her performances at Club Enastron. The second single from the album was the title track "Kainourgia Ego" which was released to coincide with the release of the album in late December 2008. Kainourgia Ego was set to be repackaged with three other songs and a remix with Nikos Antipas continuing the music composition and the three lyricists (GML, R.Roussi, V.Gerothodorou) also writing one of each of the new tracks, however as the production of Garbi's following album was underway, the prepackage was cancelled with its material announced to be included in the new album.

On an episode of Mega Star on 30 November 2008, Garbi addressed rumours of her switching record labels, stating that Kainourgia Ego will be the last album she is obligated to release on her current contract with Sony BMG Greece, and that she has given thought to switching music labels.

Garbi planned to perform 15 shows at Polis Studio as part of the 2009/2010 winter music season titled "Kainourgia Ego". Kainourgia Ego premiered on the 13 December 2009, opening its doors every Sunday and Monday to the public in a music scene designed and directed by Vassilis Myrianthopoulos and Olga Laskaratou, with music overseen by Nikos Antipas. Kainourgia Ego at Polis Studio was a success, where Garbi and her guest performers were called back for an encore performance almost every night. However, Kainourgia Ego at Polis Studio closed before its due date as a result of disagreements between the venue and the shows production team.

=== 2010–2011: Label change and Pazl ===
On 3 November, the lead single "Ta Iheia", originally planned for the repackage of Kainourgia Ego was released through internet music news website Starnews.gr, announcing the 2009 re-release of the album. A photo shoot for the artwork of the album took place on 7 November, directed by John Mitropoulos. In an interview with Love Radio, the station that exclusively premiered the first single "Oi Skepseis", Garbi announced that the production of the album Pazl was underway. The album was her second studio album composed by Nikos Antipas, continuing with the genre of previous album Kainourgia Ego which had an alternative yet laiko music style. Three of the album's tracks were originally planned to be incorporated into a repackage of the previous album, however, that project did not materialize.

The year also saw Garbi announce her intentions to part ways with Sony Music Greece where she had been for the last 24 years, stating in an interview with Ihos Fm:

...the situation is progressing quietly. I believe all I had to give, I have given, and all they had to give, they have also given. I'm sure that my fans are very pleased with my decision to leave Sony, due to the fact that the last few years, I have not been supported and backed by the label to the extent that is expected. It will be all for the best.

Subsequently, in June 2010, "OK" magazine confirmed her label departure as well as the release of a new album composed by Nikos Antipas. The magazine announced that Garbi and Antipas would release two new singles in the summer prior to the album's release, although this did not materialize. In September 2010, Garbi released a remix of her song "Kanourgia Ego".

On 19 February 2011, Garbi's new album, Pazl was digitally released exclusively through major Greek website "In.gr", with users able to download the entire track listing as a gift for a limited time. The site also featured an exclusive interview, in which Garbi noted that the album will also be released in CD format in the coming weeks. Following an interview with collaborating lyricist, Manos Eleftheriou, album composer Nikos Antipas announced that the album would be released officially to stores by the end on March. Following the termination of the free promotional giveaway of the album, Garbi later revealed on her official website that the album will be released on her new label Universal Music Greece.

=== 2012–2015: Greatest hits, Italian album, Front Seat Records and Perierges Meres ===
On 2 May 2012, Garbi announced via Twitter that she would be releasing a new single during the month of May. It was also announced that Garbi's next project will be performing live at an Athens Cinema, also featuring husband Dionysis Schoinas for the Fall/Winter Season of 2012. In July, Garbi announced that her upcoming album would be released in the fall and it would be contain some of her older hits as covers in Italian.

In December 2012, Garbi signed onto Front Seat Records, a label launched by Sony Music Greece executive Giannis Doxas. A new single by Garbi titled "Pio Pano Apo Sena" was released by her former longtime label, Sony Music Greece, under the Front Seat Records imprint. This label change signaled an end to her recent label change with Universal Music Greece. The single marked a return for Garbi to the laïko style of Greek commercial music, with the track being composed by Vasilis Gabrilidis, and by lyricist Thanos Papanicolaou in a collaboration with Giannis Doxas, all notable for commercial Greek music. Doxas had previously written songs for Garbi's albums such as Os Ton Paradeiso, Arhizo Polemo and most recently Emmones Idees in 2003, while he also served as A&R on her album Pos Allazei O Kairos. The track premiered on 10 December on Sfera Radio during an interview with Garbi held for 'Greek Music Week'.

The double CD Apo Kardias (Best 2013) was released as a covermount with Espresso magazine on 23 March 2013, followed by a retail release on 18 April 2013. She also confirmed the release of a concert DVD of her performance at Athens Odeon Cinema complex in Kosmopolis earlier in the year.

Shortly after the release of her greatest hits album, Katy announced that the Italian album (titled Buona Vita) would be released in Italy on 8 June 2013 by Egea Records, following a collaboration with Italian composer and producer Alberto Zeppieri in Milan, Italy. The album features covers of Italian songs such as the duet with Ornella Vanoni "Buona Vita" and with Carlo Marrale from Matia Bazar "Ti Sento Se Nioto", but also covers of Garbi's past hits like "Pos Allazei O Kairos (Anemos)" (2006), "Kainourgia Ego" (2008), "Hamena" & "Tha Melanholiso" (1996).

Garbi performed her past song "Ierosilia" in a new version at 10th Mad Video Music Awards in 2013, alongside singer Nikiforos and musical group Rec.

On 20 November 2013, Garbi released the title "Anemodarmena Ipsi" from her upcoming album. On 10 December 2013 the full-length studio album Perierges Meres was released by Minos EMI under the Front Seat label. Following the closure of Sony Music Greece in July 2013, Giannis Doxas moved his label Front Seat Records to Minos EMI, making Minos EMI a new major label home for Garbi. In June 2014, due to the title track's airplay over the past year, Garbi performed "Anemodarmena Ipsi" with Stan at the Mad VMA's of 2015. Garbi also received a nomination for Best Female Adult at the same awards ceremony.

=== 2015–2017: Panik Platinum, the 80's Musical & Spase Tous Deiktes ===
On 17 October 2015, Garbi announced live on Alpha TV morning show Spiti Spitaki Mou that she had signed with Panik Records subsidiary Panik Platinum. On 10 November 2015, she commenced a run of performances in the co-lead role of Jenny Pappas in Barbarella: the 80's Musical alongside fellow Greek singers Eleni Foureira and Ivi Adamou. The musical, written by Giorgos Valaris and Stelios Papadopoulos, was a romantic comedy based on both Greek and international 80's hits and ran for 80 performances, ending its run in March 2016. Garbi played Jenny Pappas, a well-known singer performing various of her hits including "Sain Tropez" and "To Tzini".

Throughout the Athens winter season of 2015–16, Garbi performed at Apotheke and then later Cabaret @ Romeo. Both residencies occurred concurrently with Garbi's 80's musical performances, requiring the singer to go from one venue to the other to perform.

On April 18, 2016, Garbi teamed up with friend and fashion designer Apostolos Mitropoulos at Mad TV MadWalk 2016 by Aperol Spritz. Garbi performed a Greek remix of German singer Shantel 2007 hit, "Disko Partizani". In July, Panik Platinum released digital single "Savvatovrado" with the backing vocals of husband Dionisis Schinas.

In October, 2016 composer Giorgos Sabanis publicised that he was recording a new single for Garbi with lyrics by Nikos Gritsis. The single Avrio was released on 31 October 2016 followed by a music video. In December, Garbi commenced performances with singer Stella Kalli at Fos in Athens. The duo performed many sold-out performances through to the end of April 2017.

In April and October 2017 two further singles "Kaneis San Esena" and "Vale Mia Teleia" were released. Garbi commenced performances at Stage Live, Thessaloniki with Vasilis Karras and Christos Menidiatis on 24 November 2017. On 20 December 2017 Garbi's 20th studio album was released Spase Tous Deiktes by Panik Records.

=== 2018–2019: Iera Odos, North American Tour and Phoebus collaboration ===
Garbi's scheduled performances in Thessaloniki alongside Vasilis Karras and Christos Menidiatis continued in Athens at club Iera Odos, premiering in February and running until the end of April.

In March 2018, Garbi disclosed to London Greek Radio that she was recording a duet with her husband, Dionysis Schinas, written by songwriter, Phoebus. This would be the first time Garbi and Phoebus collaborated since the album, To Kati in 2000.

From June to September, Garbi commenced summer performances at Akrotiri Nightclub in Athens, alongside Notis Sfakianakis. The string of performances in Athens was the second time the two artists collaborated on stage since performing at Enastron in the 2008/2009 winter season. On 27 August, Garbi performed a one-off concert at Papagou Garden Theatre as part of the Papagou Summer Festival 2018. The concert program, produced by well-known composer Posidonas Giannopoulos, included classic favourites by past and present artists as well as Garbi's more familiar tracks.

Throughout Autumn 2018, Garbi embarked on a tour of North America alongside husband, Schinas. The pair performed five showed across Toronto, New York City and Chicago. During the tour, Garbi visited a Greek school in Brooklyn, New York, where she was met by young school students singing her 1993 hit, "Pes To Mena Fili". Garbi's tour concluded with a performance at Hilton Park Lane, London, alongside Christos Holidis and Christos Menidiatis.

In 2019, Garbi released the singles "Tha Melagholiso (OtherView Remix - MAD VMA 2019)" feat. Alcatrash, "Ilios De Vgeni An Den Peis Kalimera" and "Kormia Hamena" with music and lyrics by Phoebus. The latter two singles are precursors to a 2019 album composed entirely by Phoebus, marking 30 years of Garbi's discography and 19 years since the last time the duo collaborated with each other.

=== 2019–2021: 30 Years Katy Garbi concert and live album, Enastron, Aftokinisi and Christmas album ===
On 16 September 2019, a special concert was held at Katrakeio Theater, Nikaia in honour of Garbi's 30 years of discography. Garbi performed live in front of an audience of 6,000 spectators and was joined on stage by fellow artists Giorgos Papadopoulos, Giorgos Sambanis, Eleni Foureira, Dionysis Schinas, Kostas Tournas and Antonis Remos, performing duets of some of Garbi's greatest hits. Garbi's long time friend and well-known Greek artist Anna Vissi paid tribute to Garbi in a video message screened during the concert. The concert was recorded and released on April 13, 2020, as a three-disc live album titled 30 Hronia Katy Garbi (Live Katrakio 2019).

On 29 November 2019 Garbi commenced winter performances at Enastron alongside Giorgos Sambanis and Demy. In 2020, Garbi and Phoebus released the single "S' Opoion Areso" from their upcoming studio album collaboration.

In January 2021 Garbi was one of the four judges in the weekly live concerts of House of Fame, alongside Giannis Ploutarhos, Phoebus and Giorgos Arsenakos. In March, Panik Platinum released "Atofio Hrisafi", a remake of Garbi's 1994 hit featuring husband Dionysis Schinas. The single peaked at number 1 on the IFPI Greek Airplay Charts.

On 8 November Garbi released her next single written by Phoebus called "Ama Figo". The concept of the single's music video is the respect of women. In December 2021, Garbi commenced winter residency at Aftokinisi 81 alongside Christos Menidiatis, Alcatrash and her son Dimitris Schinas.

In early December, Garbi announced the opening of her own e-shop, titled "tokati.gr", paying tribute to her 2000 single "To Kati". On 20 December, Panik Platinum re-released Garbi's 1998 Christmas album Christougenna Me Tin Katy featuring a newly recorded Greek version of "Carol of the Bells".

=== 2022–present: TV appearances, Mad VMAs 2022 and Summer Tour ===
Commencing on 7 February 2022, the Star Channel fashion program "Shopping Star" featured a week-long episode centering on the selection of clothing the participants would wear to a night at Garbi's residency at Aftokinisi 81. The week-long series which featured a video cameo from Garbi, was rated third by general audience for the afternoon timeslot reaching 17.8% of the audience share. On 12 March, Garbi performed live on the premiere of the Alpha TV music show "Chart Show", hosted by Despina Vandi. The episode which listed the 30 most successful Greek songs of the 1990s, awarded Garbi's 1996 song "Perasmena Ksehasmena" with second place.

In March, Panik Platinum released "Tryferotita", a remake of Garbi's 1997 hit as a duet with fellow House of Fame judge, Yannis Ploutarchos. The single peaked at number 12 on the IFPI Greek Airplay Charts. Later that month, Panik Records released a special LP record edition of Garbi's 1997 album Evaisthisies, containing six additional remakes and live versions of some of the album's tracks, including the single Kivotos featuring Antonis Remos, released in 2020. The special edition also included a bonus 7-inch single containing the remake of Atofio Hrisafi and the original track from 1994.

At the MAD Video Music Awards 2022 Garbi performed a remake of her 1997 hit "Ola Sta Katalogizo" as a duet with Thodoris Ferris. The track was later released as the fifth single of her upcoming album penned by Phoebus. Receiving two nominations for "Song of the Year" and "Best Female Adult", Garbi was ultimately awarded the "Honorary MAD VMA Award" for over 30 years of contribution to the Greek music industry, which was presented by Roula Koromila.

Throughout summer 2022, Garbi supported by her son and performer Dimitris Schinas, embarked on an 18-show tour titled 'Ola Mazi 2022', with performances across Greece, London and Cyprus.

== Personal life ==
Garbi and fellow Greek singer Dionisis Schinas dated for a lengthy period during the early 1990s, including 1993 when Garbi participated in a duet with him. Rumors began to surface that the duet put them in something a lot deeper than a normal business collaboration, however in the coming months, they were to take separate paths and continue on with their solo careers. In the time after they both were seeing other people, Dionisis was seen various times with Greek singer Elli Kokkinou who was entering into the music industry. They soon broke up and on May 4, 1997, (after a live wedding proposal) Garbi married singer Dionisis Schinas and on November 11, 1999, the couple had their first child together, a boy.

== Philanthropy ==
Garbi has been involved in many fund-raising acts for Greece, holding numerous concerts for homeless children, the "Erithros Stavros" of Greece and sick children of Athens hospital. She also held many concerts for the Red Cross in many countries. She has contributed to Live Aid concerts along with other well-known Greek singers for numerous causes. This has added to her popularity. Recently she has devoted a concert to the fire victims of Greece (2007), where all the money would be used as charity for the victims.

"It is our obligation to offer what we can. It is impossible to find a single Greek who is not bent over from the human pain and the size of destruction. I shared my desire to help the victims with the mayor of the city of Egaleo, and he supported me in every way. The concert will take place in the theater of Egaleo, and all the money will be given to aid the victims. So, on Friday, at 21:30 local time, we will all be waiting for you to come there."

== Discography ==
- Studio albums
  - Prova (1989)
  - Gyalia Karfia (1990)
  - Entalma Silepseos (1991)
  - Tou Feggariou Anapnoes (1992)
  - Os Ton Paradeiso (1993)
  - Atofio Hrysafi (1994)
  - Arhizo Polemo (1996)
  - Evaisthisies (1997)
  - Hristougenna Me Tin Katy (1998)
  - Doro Theou (1999)
  - To Kati (2000)
  - Apla Ta Pragmata (2001)
  - Emmones Idees (2003)
  - Eho Sta Matia Ourano (2005)
  - Pos Allazei O Kairos (2006)
  - Kainourgia Ego (2008)
  - Pazl (2011)
  - Buona Vita (2013)
  - Perierges Meres (2013)
  - Spase Tous Deiktes (2017)
  - Simfonia Xaraktiron (2025)
- EPs
  - Ksipoliti Horevo (1995)
  - Ti theloune ta matia sou (2000)
  - Remix Plus (2002)
  - Mia Kardia (2002)
  - Galazio Kai Lefko (2004)
- Live albums
  - 18 Hronia Live (2007)
  - 30 Hronia Katy Garbi (Live Katrakio 2019) (2020)
- Compilation albums
  - To Kati (2000)
  - Apo Kardias (2013)

== Videography ==
| Preceded by Cleopatra with Olou tou kosmou i elpida | Greece in the Eurovision Song Contest; 1993 | Succeeded by Kostas Bigalis and The Sea Lovers with To trehantiri |
