= Galazio Kai Lefko + Remixes =

Galazio Kai Lefko Γαλάζιο Και Λευκό

EP by Katy Garbi
- Released: 22 July 2004
- Recorded: Sofita studio
- Genre: Pop, Dance, Modern Laika
- Length: 19:52
- Language: Greek
- Label: Sony Music Greece; Columbia
- Producer: Giannis Doulamis

Katy Garbi chronology
Emmones Idees (2003)	Galazio Kai Lefko; Γαλάζιο Και Λευκό (2004)	Eho Sta Matia Ourano (2005)

Singles from Galazio Kai Lefko
- 1. "Katapliktiko" Released: 4 June 2004; 2. "Galazio Kai Lefko" Released: 19 July 2004; 3. "Esena Mono [Summer Dance Remix]" Released: 20 August 2004

Galazio Kai Lefko (Greek: Γαλάζιο Και Λευκό; English: Blue And White) is the third EP by Greek artist, Katy Garbi. It was released on 22 July 2004 by Sony Music Greece and received gold certification, selling over 15,000 units. The title track was released to coincide with the 2004 Athens Olympics with its title name reflecting the national colours, blue and white.

== Track listing ==
No.	Title	Lyrics	Music	Length
1.	"Galazio Kai Lefko" (Γαλάζιο Και Λευκό; Blue And White)	Nikos Terzis	Nikos Terzis	3:54
2.	"Katapliktiko" (Καταπληκτικό; Amazing)	Tasos Vougiatzis	Ilias Pantazopoulos	3:46
3.	"Esena Mono (Summer Dance Remix)" (Εσένα Μόνο; Only You)	Nikos Gritsis	Dimitris Kontopoulos	5:26
4.	"Viastika (New Tempo Mix)" (Βιάστηκα; I Hurried)	Antonis Pappas	Nikos Terzis	3:54
5.	"Esena Mono (Radio Remix)" (Εσένα Μόνο; Only You)	Nikos Gritsis	Dimitris Kontopoulos	2:52
Total length:				19:52

== Singles ==
The following singles were officially released to radio stations, gaining considerable airplay. "Katapliktiko" was the only single with a music video.

1. "Katapliktiko" (Amazing / Director: Kostas Kapetanidis)
2. "Galazio Kai Lefko" (Blue And White)
3. "Esena Mono (Summer Dance Remix)" (Only You)

== Credits ==
Credits adapted from liner notes.

=== Personnel ===
- Dimitris Antoniou – guitars (tracks 3, 4)
- Stelios Goulielmos, Anna Ioannidou – backing vocals (track 2)
- Katerina Kiriakou, Alex Panayi – backing vocals (track 1)
- Lazaros Palaskas – keyboards (track 2)
- Ilias Pantazopoulos – orchestration, programming (track 2)
- Panagiotis Stergiou – cura, lute (tracks 3, 4)
- Nikos Terzis – orchestration, programming, keyboards (tracks 1, 3, 4, 5)

=== Production ===
- Ntinos Diamantopoulos – photographer
- Giannis Doulamis – production manager
- Giannis Ioannidis, Petros Siakavellas (Digital Press Hellas) – mastering
- Lefteris Neromiliotis (Sofita studio) – sound engineer, mix engineer
- Dimitris Rekouniotis – art direction

== Charts ==
Galazio Kai Lefko made its debut at number 2 on the 'Greece Top 50 Singles' charts for 24 weeks, and it was certified gold by IFPI.

Chart	Providers	Peak Position	Certification
Greek Albums Chart	IFPI	2	Gold
