= Mia Kardia =

Mia Kardia Μια Καρδιά

EP by Katy Garbi
- Released: November 8, 2002
- Recorded: Sofita studio
- Genres: Pop, Modern Laika, Dance
- Length: 21:32
- Language: Greek
- Labels: Sony Music Greece; Columbia
- Producer: Giannis Doulamis

Katy Garbi chronology
Apla Ta Pragmata (2001)	Mia Kardia; Μια Καρδιά (2002)	Emmones Idees (2003)

Singles from Mia Kardia
- 1. "Ante Geia" Released: November 11, 2002; 2. "Tha Meinei Metaxi Mas" Released: January 20, 2003; 3. "Mia Kardia Tin Eho" Released: March 14, 2003; 4. "M' Eheis Arrostisei" Released: May 23, 2003

Mia Kardia (Greek: A Heart; English: Μια Καρδιά) is the second EP by Greek artist, Katy Garbi. It was released on 8 November 2002 by Sony Music Greece and received triple-platinum certification, selling over 60,000 units, making it Katy's most successful EP to date. It contains five tracks; four of them became singles and gained massive radio airplay, including a duet with Giorgos Tsalikis.

== Track listing ==
No.	Title	Lyrics	Music	Length
1.	"Ante Geia" (Άντε Γεια; Goodbye)	Panos Falaras	Kostas Miliotakis	4:33
2.	"Mia Kardia Tin Eho" (Μια Καρδιά Την Έχω; I Have A Heart)	Tasos Vougiatzis	Christos Dantis	4:14
3.	"To Thelo Toso" (Το Θέλω Τόσο; I Want It So Much)	Nektarios Tirakis	Ilias Pantazopoulos	3:38
4.	"M' Eheis Arrostisei" (Μ' Έχεις Αρρωστήσει; You Got Me Sick)	Panos Falaras	Kostas Miliotakis	4:46
5.	"Tha Μeinei Metaxi Mas (ft. Giorgos Tsalikis)" (Θα Μείνει Μεταξύ Μας; It'll Be Stay Between Us)	Panos Falaras	Kostas Miliotakis	4:21
Total length:				21:32

== Singles ==
The following singles were officially released to radio stations with music videos, except the songs "Ante Geia" and "Mia Kardia Tin Eho".

"Ante Geia"

It was the lead single and released on 11 November 2002. It was initially released as an exclusive on Sfera FM radio and soon gained massive airplay on radio stations nationwide.

"Tha Meinei Metaxi Mas"

It was the second single and release on 20 January 2003 with music video, directed by Manolis Tzirakis. The video clip was exclusively released on MAD TV and was a huge success. Katy performed all of the EP's singles on Fame Story 1, including "Tha Meinei Metaxi Mas" in a duet with contestant Thanos Petrelis.

"Mia Kardia Tin Eho"

It was the third single and released on 14 March 2003 gaining a substantial amount of airplay and also being featured in many compilation albums.

"M' Eheis Arrostisei"

It was the fourth and last single and released on 23 May 2003 with music video, directed by Giorgos Gkavalos. The video clip was exclusively released on MAD TV and marking a success airplay after the last hits.

== Credits ==
Credits adapted from liner notes.

=== Personnel ===
- Giannis Bithikotsis – bouzouki, cura, baglama (track 5)
- Savvas Christodoulou – guitars (track 5)
- Christos Dantis – orchestration, programming, keyboards, backing vocals (track 2)
- Anna Ioannidou – backing vocals (track 3)
- Telis Kafkas – bass (track 5)
- Katerina Kiriakou, Alex Panayi – backing vocals (tracks 1, 4)
- Giannis Lionakis – guitars (track 5)
- Kostas Miliotakis – orchestration, programming, keyboards (tracks 1, 4, 5)
- Andreas Mouzakis – drums (track 5)
- Arsenis Nasis – percussion (tracks 1, 4)
- Ilias Pantazopoulos – orchestration, programming, keyboards (track 3)

=== Production ===
- Aris Binis (Sofita studio) – sound engineer, mix engineer (track 3)
- Giannis Doulamis – production manager
- Al Giga – styling
- Giannis Ioannidis, Petros Siakavellas (Digital Press Hellas) – mastering
- Christos Kosmas (Echo studio) – sound engineer, mix engineer (track 5)
- Lefteris Neromiliotis (Sofita studio) – sound engineer, mix engineer (1, 2, 4)
- Petros Paraschis – art direction
- Roula Revi – photographer
- Despina Triantafillidou – cover processing
- Stefanos Vasilakis – hair styling
- Manos Vinichakis – make up

== Charts ==
Mia Kardia made its debut at number 1 on the 'Greece Top 50 Singles' charts for 38 weeks, and it was certified triple-platinum by IFPI.

Chart	Providers	Peak Position	Certification
Greek Albums Chart	IFPI	1	3×Platinum
