= Isovios Desmos =

Single by Katy Garbi featuring Stathis Raftopoulos

from the album Pos Allazei O Kairos
- Released: July 2006
- Genre: Pop
- Length: 4:42
- Label: Sony BMG Greece/Columbia
- Songwriter: Pegasos
- Producer: Pegasos

Katy Garbi minor singles chronology
"To Narkotiko Mou" (2005)	"Isovios Desmos" (2006)	"Pos Allazei O Kairos" (2006)

"Isovios Desmos" (Greek: "Ισόβιος Δεσμός"; English: Eternal bond) is the first single released from Greek singer Katy Garbi's 2006 album Pos Allazei O Kairos. It is a duet with Fame Story 4 contestant Stathis Raftopoulos and was written by Pegasos. Garbi and Raftopoulos performed the song in the fourth and last installment of the hit talent music show Fame Story, where Garbi was part of the judging panel and Raftopoulos was a contestant. The song was the first digital download track to be released in Greece and was also released as a ringtone.
