= Kainourgia Ego =

Kainourgia ego Καινούργια εγώ

Studio album by Katy Garbi
- Released: 22 December 2008
- Genre: Modern Laika, Pop
- Length: 33:25
- Language: Greek
- Label: Sony BMG Greece/Columbia
- Producer: Katy Garbi

Katy Garbi chronology
18 Hronia Live (2007)	Kainourgia ego Καινούργια εγώ (2008)	Pazl (2011)

Katy Garbi studio album chronology
Pos Allazei O Kairos (2006)	Kainourgia ego (2008)	Pazl (2011)

Singles from Kainourgia Ego
- 1. "Afto aksizo" Released: 14 November 2008; 2. "Kainourgia ego" Released: 22 December 2008; 3. "S'agapo se miso" Released: 21 March 2009; 4. "S'agapo se miso (Remix)" Released: 08 June 2009

Kainourgia ego (Greek: Καινούργια εγώ; English: A new me) is the 16th studio album by Greek singer Katy Garbi. It was released on 22 December 2008 by Sony BMG Greece and was her first studio album since the 2006 release of Pos Allazei O Kairos.

== Background ==
In mid-2008, it was announced that Katy Garbi was in the studio recording songs for a summer CD single and it would be a precursor to an album to be released in the fall. She stated that she would be returning to the pop music of her past and that the writer of all songs would be Pegasos. By October, everything had changed with no CD single released and with the announcement of Nikos Antipas taking on the role of composer on the album.

The album, titled Kainourgia ego, will be a new approach by presenting a different Katy Garbi as justified by the title, which translates into "a new me". Garbi stated in an interview on Mega Channel's Mega Star that the album "is one of my greatest musical collaborations, with Nikos Antipas; everybody knows who he is, and with his experience, great work and enthusiasm, we have greatly increased the strength of this latest work, which will present a completely refreshed, new and desirable Katy Garbi and the end result will be nothing short of a success, I guarantee you!! (translated)"

== Release and reception ==
The album was released in Greece and Cyprus on 22 December 2008 and serves as the return of new material for Katy Garbi after two years following her 2006 release of Pos Allazei O Kairos. Succeeding her 2007 two-disc live album 18 Hronia Live, the 10-track album Kainourgia Ego will be Garbi's final release on her current contract with Sony BMG, which in total has spanned 19 years as of 2008. It was originally planned for the album to be re-released with additional tracks, however, Garbi decided on releasing a full-length studio album instead.

=== Charts ===
"Kainourgia ego" debuted on Greek album charts at number 19. During its second week it moved up eight spots, placing it at number 11. It finally managed to top the chart in the second week of January 2009, and became Garbi's latest release to peak at top position on the charts.

== Promotion ==
The promotion of 'Kainourgia ego' began in November 2008 as Garbi kicked off the winter season at Club Enastron with the first single of the album "Afto aksizo" prior to its release. Within a month of its release, Alpha TV began airing a 20-second promotional spot of the album during its morning time slot showcasing various songs. Large promotional banners were erected outside of select Metropolis music stores nationwide informing of the album's release.

With the first music video "Kainourgia ego" premiering on MAD TV, the music channel's website www.mad.tv and its affiliate the Katy Garbi official fanclub Garbofans.gr held a competition where members would compete by recreating the new album's cover art using selected images from its official artwork for a chance at winning a selection of albums from Garbi's discography.

=== Singles ===
"Afto Aksizo" was lead single of the album. A slow Zeibekiko, it was presented by Garbi at Enastron Music Hall on 14 November 2008 during Garbi's premiere with Notis Sfakianakis; the two then performed live at Enastron for the winter 2008–2009 season. The second single was the title track of the album "Kainourgia ego", which is a collaboration with Greek rapper Thirio. It was the first single from the album to be made into a music video and was also John Mitropoulos' first music video as director. Mitropoulos was also the album's photographer. A "making of" preview was made available by MAD TV on 19 January 2009. The music video premiered on an episode of Alpha TV's Mad And The City, and was distributed to all television networks shortly thereafter. Although there were initially no plans to promote "Afto aksizo" again following the release of the second single, Sony BMG Greece released a studio video of it onto Garbi's YouTube channel three weeks after the release of "Kainourgia ego" as a result of its continued success on the radio charts. Announced nearly two months after the release of the second single, "S'agapo se miso" was proclaimed the third single from the album. The dance-oriented song, it was released as a radio single only. In a radio interview on 26 March 2009 on Grevena Radio, Garbi stated that "S'agapo se miso" would also be released in remix form when it was officially issued to radio stations. On 8 June, Garbi's birthday, "S'agapo se miso (Remix)" was subsequently released to all radio stations across Greece.

== Track listing ==
Kainourgia ego Track Listing
No.	Title	Lyrics	Music	Length
1.	"Kainourgia ego (feat. Thirio)" (Καινούργια εγώ; A new me)	GML, Thirio (Giorgos Drakoulias)	Nikos Antipas	3:40
2.	"Efiga" (Έφυγα; I have gone)	Rebecca Roussi	Nikos Antipas	3:35
3.	"An m'agapas" (Αν μ' αγαπάς; If you love me)	Viki Gerothodorou	Nikos Antipas	3:17
4.	"S'agapo se miso" (Σ' αγαπώ, σε μισώ; I love you, I hate you)	GML	Nikos Antipas	3:44
5.	"Ego tha sou grafo" (Εγώ θα σου γράφω; I'll be writing to you)	Viki Gerothodorou	Nikos Antipas	3:20
6.	"Antipaloi se duo stratopeda" (Αντίπαλοι σε δύο στρατόπεδα; Opponents in two camps)	Rebecca Roussi	Nikos Antipas	2:50
7.	"Stin kolasi kalitera" (Στην κόλαση καλύτερα; Better in hell)	GML	Nikos Antipas	2:52
8.	"Me pio antallagma" (Με ποιο αντάλλαγμα; With what in exchange)	Viki Gerothodorou	Nikos Antipas	3:52
9.	"Me ti psihi" (Με τι ψυχή; With what kind of guts)	Rebecca Roussi	Nikos Antipas	3:04
10.	"Afto aksizo" (Αυτό αξίζω; I deserve this)	GML	Nikos Antipas	3:16

== Credits ==
=== Personnel ===
- Nikos Antipas – orchestration, programming, keyboards / drums (2, 5, 8, 10) / percussion (6, 7, 9)
- Savvas Christodoulou – guitars (7, 8, 9)
- Nikos Kalatzakos – piano (8, 10)
- Andreas Karantinis – bouzouki (8, 9)
- Manolis Karantinis – bouzouki (3, 10)
- Thodoris Katsaros – bouzouki (7)
- Giannis Konstantinidis – guitars (1, 2, 4, 5)
- Thomas Konstantinou – oud, cümbüş (3)
- Konstantinos Meretakis – percussion (3)
- Christos Pertsinidis – guitars (3, 10)
- Nikos Sakellarakis – trumpet (6)
- Panagiotis Stergiou – guitars, bouzouki (6)
- Thanasis Vasilopoulos – clarinet (7)

=== Production ===
- Takis Argiriou (111 studio) – sound engineer, mix engineer (3)
- Thodoris Chrisanthopoulos (Fabelsound) – mastering
- Katy Garbi – executive producer
- Kessaris – jewellery
- Ilias Lakkas (Kiriazis studio) – sound engineer, mix engineer (1, 2, 4, 5, 6, 7, 8, 9, 10)
- Tolis Michalis – cover processing
- Apostolos Mitropoulos – costume designer
- John Mitropoulos – photographer
- Thanos Molos – make up
- Michalis Orfanos – print
- Petros Paraschis – art direction
- Stefanos Vasilakis – hair styling

== Release history ==
Region	Date	Label	Format
Greece	22 December 2008	Sony BMG, Columbia	CD
Cyprus	22 December 2008	Sony BMG, Columbia	CD
Various	5 January 2009	Sony BMG, Columbia	Digital download
