= Eho Sta Matia Ourano =

Eho Sta Matia Ourano Έχω Στα Μάτια Ουρανό

Studio album by Katy Garbi
- Released: 22 April 2005
- Recorded: Vox studio
- Genre: Pop, Modern Laika, Dance
- Length: 47:26
- Language: Greek
- Label: Sony BMG Greece; Columbia
- Producer: Giannis Doulamis

Katy Garbi chronology
Galazio Kai Lefko + Remixes (2004)	Eho Sta Matia Ourano; Έχω Στα Μάτια Ουρανό (2005)	Pos Allazei O Kairos (2006)

Singles from Eho Sta Matia Ourano
- 1. "Akouse, Agori Mou" Released: 4 April 2005; 2. "Eho Sta Matia Ourano" Released: 9 May 2005; 3. "To Narkotiko Mou" Released: 6 June 2005; 4. "Spaciba Baby" Released: 11 July 2005

Eho Sta Matia Ourano (Greek: Έχω Στα Μάτια Ουρανό; English: I Have The Sky In My Eyes) is the fourteenth studio album by Greek artist, Katy Garbi. It was released on 22 April 2005 by Sony BMG Greece and received gold certification, selling over 30,000 units*. Christos Dantis composed all the album and also performs a duet in the song "Spaciba Baby". Katy promoted three of her songs on ANT1 show Fame Story 3 before album's release. It contains pop and modern laika songs and is Katy's last collaboration with her producer, Giannis Doulamis, who was the producer of all her albums since her debut album Prova.

* In 2005, gold was the album whose sales exceeded 20,000 units.

== Track listing ==
All music is composed by Christos Dantis.

No.	Title	Lyrics	Length
1.	"Akouse, Agori Mou" (Άκουσε, Αγόρι Μου; Listen Up, My Boy)	Vaggelis Konstantinidis	4:17
2.	"To Narkotiko Mou" (Το Ναρκωτικό Μου; My Drug)	Vasilis Giannopoulos	3:34
3.	"Eho Sta Matia Ourano" (Έχω Στα Μάτια Ουρανό; I Have The Sky In My Eyes)	Vasilis Giannopoulos	4:21
4.	"Mia Signomi Akoma" (Μια Συγγνώμη Ακόμα; One More Apology)	Natalia Germanou	4:42
5.	"Spaciba Baby (ft. Christos Dantis)" (Thank You Baby)	Natalia Germanou	3:12
6.	"Vasanaki" (Βασανάκι; Torturer)	Natalia Germanou	3:34
7.	"Teleia Kai Pavla" (Τελεία Και Παύλα; Full Stop)	Vasilis Giannopoulos	3:16
8.	"Moni Mou Gia Parti Mou" (Μόνη Μου Για Πάρτη Μου; By Myself For Myself)	Vaggelis Konstantinidis	3:55
9.	"San Mahairi Me Karfonei" (Σαν Μαχαίρι Με Καρφώνει; Like A Knife Tt Nails Me)	Vasilis Giannopoulos	3:37
10.	"Aporo Poioi Theoi" (Απορώ Ποιοι Θεοί; I Wonder Which Gods)	Vaggelis Konstantinidis	3:45
11.	"M' Eheis Trelanei" (Μ' Έχεις Τρελάνει; You Have Driven Me Mad)	Vasilis Giannopoulos	2:47
12.	"Mia Ginaika Moni" (Μια Γυναίκα Μόνη; A Woman By Herself)	Vaggelis Konstantinidis	3:48
13.	"Pirotehnima" (Πυροτέχνημα; Firework)	Vasilis Giannopoulos	3:26
Total length:			47:26

== Singles ==
The following singles were officially released to radio stations with music videos, except the songs "Eho Sta Matia Ourano" and "To Narkotiko Mou". The songs "Teleia Kai Pavla" and "Moni Mou Gia Parti Mou" were not released as singles, but gained a lot of airplay.

"Akouse, Agori Mou"

"Akouse, Agori Mou" was the lead single and released on 4 April 2005 with music video, directed by Giorgos Gkavalos. She performed it on Mad Video Music Awards 2005 and gained massive radio airplay becoming a summer hit.

"Eho Sta Matia Ourano"

"Eho Sta Matia Ourano" was the second single and released on 9 May 2003, a few days after album's release, having a successful airplay until today.

"To Narkotiko Mou"

"To Narkotiko Mou" was the third single and released on 6 June 2005 and had a good airplay.

"Spaciba Baby"

"Spaciba Baby" was the fourth and last single and released on 11 July 2005 with music video, directed by Giorgos Gkavalos. The song had a successful airplay on radios and TV shows.

== Credits ==
Credits adapted from liner notes.

=== Personnel ===
- Antonis Andreou – trombone (7)
- Vanias Apergis – orchestration at interlude (10)
- Christina Argiri – backing vocals (6, 7)
- Christos Dantis – orchestration, programming, keyboards (1, 2, 4, 5, 6, 7, 8, 9, 10, 12, 13) / guitars (2, 4, 5) / backing vocals (1, 2, 6, 7, 10, 12) / second vocal (3, 9, 11)
- Tasos Gouras – keyboards (3, 11)
- Katerina Kiriakou – backing vocals (6, 7)
- Giorgos Kostoglou – bass (3, 4, 6, 7, 9, 11, 13)
- Giannis Lionakis – orchestration, programming (3, 11) / guitars (1, 3, 6, 7, 8, 9, 11, 12, 13) / lute (8) / baglama (3, 6, 7, 9, 11)
- Alkis Misirlis – drums (3, 4, 6, 7, 9, 11, 13)
- Alex Panagi – backing vocals (6, 7)
- Ilias Pourtsidis – bouzouki (12)
- Nikos Sakellarakis – trumpet (7)
- Panagiotis Stergiou – bouzouki (3, 6, 7, 9, 11, 13) / cura, oud (13)
- Natasa Zenetzi – second vocal (8)

=== Production ===
- Aris Binis (Vox studio) – sound engineer, mix engineer
- Giannis Doulamis – production manager
- Nikolas Georgiou – styling
- Giannis Ioannidis (Digital Press Hellas) – mastering
- Freddy Kalobratsos – make up
- Christina Papas – cover processing
- Petros Paraschis – art direction
- Trifon Samaras – hair styling
- Petros Siakavellas (Digital Press Hellas) – mastering

== Charts ==
Eho Sta Matia Ourano made its debut at number 2 on the 'Top 50 Greek Albums' charts by IFPI.

After months, it was certified gold according to sales.

Chart	Providers	Peak position	Certification
Greek Albums Chart	IFPI	2	Gold
Cypriot Album Chart	Musical Paradise Top 10	2	Gold
