= Ti Theloune Ta Matia Sou =

Ti Theloune Ta Matia Sou Τι Θέλουνε Τα Μάτια Σου

EP by Katy Garbi
- Released: December 15, 2000
- Genres: Pop, Rock, Modern laika
- Length: 21:05
- Language: Greek
- Labels: Sony Music Greece; Columbia
- Producer: Giannis Doulamis

Katy Garbi chronology
To Kati (2000)	Ti Theloune Ta Matia Sou; Τι Θέλουνε Τα Μάτια Σου (2000)	Apla Ta Pragmata (2001)

Singles from Ti Theloune Ta Matia Sou
- 1. "Ti Theloune Ta Matia Sou [Club Mix]" Released: December 15, 2000; 2. "Aspro I Mavro" Released: March 30, 2001

Ti Theloune Ta Matia Sou (Greek: Τι Θέλουνε Τα Μάτια Σου; English: What Want Your Eyes) is the first EP by Greek artist, Katy Garbi. It was released on 15 December 2000 by Sony Music Greece and received platinum certification, selling over 30,000 units. It contains three songs and two remixes of title track, containing the massive hit "Aspro I Mavro".

== Track listing ==
No.	Title	Lyrics	Music	Length
1.	"Ti Theloune Ta Matia Sou" (Τι Θέλουνε Τα Μάτια Σου; What Want Your Eyes)	Giannis Kalpouzos	Spiros Kontakis	4:11
2.	"Kane Ton Logariasmo" (Κάνε Τον Λογαριασμό; Make The Bill)	Kostas Tournas	Kostas Tournas	3:34
3.	"Aspro I Mavro" (Άσπρο Ή Μαύρο; White Or Black)	Eleni Giannatsoulia	Salah El Sharnobi; Omar Batisha	4:59
4.	"Ti Theloune Ta Matia Sou [Night Mix]"	Giannis Kalpouzos	Spiros Kontakis	4:02
5.	"Ti Theloune Ta Matia Sou [Club Mix]"	Giannis Kalpouzos	Spiros Kontakis	4:19
Total length:				21:05

== Singles ==
Katy in the "Ti Theloune Ta Matia Sou" music video.

Two singles were officially released to radio stations and gained a lot of airplay.

"Ti Theloune Ta Matia Sou"

The title track was the lead single and released on 15 December 2000 alongside the EP. The song is a rock ballad featuring rock band, Exis. It was followed by a club mix which released with music video, directed by Kostas Kapetanidis. In producing the video, Sony Music used the remix which was found to be more audience-friendly, in that it was upbeat and signature of music at that time period. Although the club mix, which was the work of Dimitris Paizis, did not feature Exis. The film clip and track became a hit on the charts and received accolades. It was shot in October 2000 and released shortly thereafter, showcasing Katy in many different abstract scenes and theming.

"Aspro I Mavro"

"Aspro I Mavro" was the second and last single and released on 30 March 2001. The song is a cover of the 1996 Algerian song "Harramt Ahebbak" and is a dance tsifteteli which has success until today.

== Credits ==
Credits adapted from liner notes.

=== Personnel ===
- Pablo Bolívar – remix orchestration (track 4)
- Akis Diximos, Anna Ioannidou, Katerina Kiriakou – backing vocals (track 3)
- Giorgos Fotopoulos – drums (track 1)
- Antonis Gounaris – orchestration, programming, keyboards (track 3)
- Manolis Karantinis – bouzouki, baglama (track 2)
- Spiros Kontakis – orchestration, guitars (track 1)
- Babis Laskarakis – guitars (track 2)
- Dimitris Paizis – orchestration, programming, keyboards (track 5)
- Giannis Saroglou – bass, second vocal (track 2)
- Soumka – programming, keyboards (tracks 1, 4)
- Kostas Tournas – orchestration (track 2)
- Philippos Tseberoulis – flute (track 2)
- Petros Xourafas – programming, keyboards (track 2)
- Barry Zealey – bass (track 1)

=== Production ===
- Christos Avdelas, Soumka (C&C studio) – sound engineer, mix engineer (tracks 1 & 4)
- Dimitris Chorianopoulos (Workshop studio) – sound engineer, mix engineer (track 5)
- Thodoris Chrisanthopoulos (Fabelsound) – mastering
- Ntinos Diamantopoulos – photographer
- Giannis Doulamis – production manager
- Lefteris Neromiliotis (Sofita studio) – sound engineer, mix engineer (track 3)
- Christos Peltekis (City studio) – editing (track 2)
- Dimitris Rekouniotis – art direction
- Katerina Sideridou – cover processing
- Giannis Tountas (City studio) – sound engineer, mix engineer (track 2)

== Charts ==
Ti Theloune Ta Matia Sou made its debut at number 2 on the 'Greece Top 50 Singles' charts for 22 weeks, and it was certified platinum by IFPI.

Chart	Providers	Peak Position	Certification
Greek Albums Chart	IFPI	2	Platinum
