= To Kati =

To Kati Το Κάτι

Studio album / greatest hits by Katy Garbi
- Released: April 10, 2000
- Recorded: Phase One studio
- Genres: Pop, Modern Laika, Dance
- Length: 2:06:08
- Language: Greek
- Labels: Sony Music Greece; Columbia
- Producer: Giannis Doulamis

Katy Garbi chronology
Doro Theou (1999)	To Kati; Το Κάτι (2000)	Ti Theloune Ta Matia Sou (2000)

Singles from To Kati
- 1. "To Kati" Released: March 10, 2000; 2. "Alitaki Mou" Released: April 14, 2000; 3. "Epitelous" Released: May 25, 2000; 4. "To Lathos Mou" Released: October 20, 2000

To Kati (Greek: Το Κάτι; English: The Something) is the eleventh studio album by Greek artist, Katy Garbi. It was released on 10 April 2000 by Sony Music Greece and received quadruple-platinum certification, selling over 240,000 units* (120,000^ albums). It was ranked among the best-selling Greek album of decade, and was the second top-seller album of 2000. The album was written entirely by Phoebus and was a farewell album under his contract with Sony Music Greece. It contains seven new songs, while the rest are greatest hits of their partnership.

* In 2000, quadruple-platinum was the album whose sales exceeded 200,000 units.

== Track listing ==
Disc 1
No.	Title	Lyrics	Music	Release album	Length
1.	"To Kati" (Το Κάτι; The Something)	Phoebus	Phoebus		6:01
2.	"Alitaki Mou" (Αλητάκι Μου; My Naughty One)	Phoebus	Phoebus		3:56
3.	"Epitelous (ft. Natasa Theodoridou)" (Επιτέλους; At Least)	Phoebus	Phoebus		5:03
4.	"Pragmata Spao" (Πράγματα Σπάω; I Break Things)	Phoebus	Phoebus		4:25
5.	"Oli Mou I Stenahoria" (Όλη Μου Η Στεναχώρια; All My Sadness)	Phoebus	Phoebus		4:25
6.	"Sopa" (Σώπα; Hush)	Phoebus	Phoebus		3:53
7.	"To Lathos Mou" (Το Λάθος Μου; My Mistake)	Phoebus	Phoebus		4:34
8.	"Atofio Hrisafi - Tha Melagholiso [Remix]" (Ατόφιο Χρυσάφι - Θα Μελαγχολήσω; Pure Gold - Become Melancholic)	Phoebus	Phoebus		4:27
9.	"Hamena" (Χαμένα; Lost)	Phoebus	Phoebus	Arhizo Polemo	3:50
10.	"Nai, Iparho Ego" (Ναι, Υπάρχω Εγώ; Yes, I Exist)	Phoebus	Phoebus	Os Ton Paradeiso	3:03
11.	"Agio Kalokairi" (Άγιο Καλοκαίρι; Holy Summer)	Giannis Doxas	Phoebus	Arhizo Polemo	4:40
12.	"Arhizo Polemo" (Αρχίζω Πόλεμο; I Declare War)	Giannis Doxas	Phoebus	Arhizo Polemo	3:07
13.	"Allo Esi Ki Allo Ego" (Άλλο Εσύ Κι Άλλο Εγώ; Another Me And Another You)	Phoebus	Phoebus	Evaisthisies	3:52
14.	"I Patrida Mou (ft. Antonis Vardis" (Η Πατρίδα Μου; My Homeland)	Phoebus	Phoebus	Evaisthisies	4:06
15.	"O Ilios Pou Egine Vrohi" (Ο Ήλιος Που Έγινε Βροχή; The Sun That Became Rain)	Phoebus	Phoebus	Atofio Hrisafi	3:44
Total length:					1:03:08

Disc 2
No.	Title	Lyrics	Music	Original release	Length
1.	"Se Poliorkia (Pes, Pes)" (Σε Πολιορκία (Πες, Πες); In Siege (Say It, Say It))	Phoebus	Phoebus	Atofio Hrisafi	3:32
2.	"Ierosilia" (Ιεροσυλία; Sacrilege)	Phoebus	Phoebus	Evaisthisies	3:40
3.	"Evaisthisies" (Ευαισθησίες; Sensitivities)	Phoebus	Phoebus	Evaisthisies	4:18
4.	"Apo Do Kai Pio Pera" (Από Δω Και Πιο Πέρα; From Here To Beyond)	Giannis Doxas	Phoebus	Arhizo Polemo	3:47
5.	"Mia Fora Ki Enan Kairo" (Μια Φορά Κι Έναν Καιρό; Once Upon A Time)	Phoebus	Phoebus	Arhizo Polemo	3:40
6.	"Apozimiosi" (Αποζημίωση; Restitution)	Phoebus	Phoebus	Evaisthisies	4:43
7.	"Ftou Xelefteria (ft. The Children's Choir Of Spiros Labrou)" (Φτου Ξελευτερία; We 're Free)	Giannis Doxas	Phoebus	Arhizo Polemo	3:29
8.	"Asimfonia Haraktiron (ft. Antonis Remos)" (Ασυμφωνία Χαρακτήρων; Mismatch Of Characters)	Phoebus	Phoebus	Evaisthisies	3:48
9.	"Kolasi" (Κόλαση; Hell)	Phoebus	Phoebus	Atofio Hrisafi	3:28
10.	"Triferotita" (Τρυφερότητα; Tenderness)	Phoebus	Phoebus	Evaisthisies	4:11
11.	"Apologisou" (Απολογήσου; Apologize)	Phoebus	Phoebus	Evaisthisies	4:02
12.	"Akouo Tin Kardoula Sou" (Ακούω Την Καρδούλα Σου; I Listen To Your Heart)	Phoebus	Phoebus	Os Ton Paradeiso	3:01
13.	"Os Ton Paradeiso" (Ως Τον Παράδεισο; Until The Paradise)	Phoebus	Phoebus	Os Ton Paradeiso	4:45
14.	"Fougaro" (Φουγάρο; Chimney)	Phoebus	Phoebus	Evaisthisies	4:07
15.	"Ola Sta Katalogizo" (Όλα Στα Καταλογίζω; Everything I Blame You)	Phoebus	Phoebus	Evaisthisies	4:18
16.	"Zisame (ft. Dionisis Schinas)" (Ζήσαμε; We Lived)	Phoebus	Phoebus	S' Agapo; Dionisis Schinas's album	4:10
Total length:					1:03:00

== Singles ==
The following singles were officially released to radio stations with music videos, except the song "Alitaki Mou". The song "Oli Mou I Stenahoria" was not released as single, but gained a lot of airplay.

"To Kati"

Katy in music video To Kati

Prior to the release date of the album, an exclusive preview of the first single "To Kati" began on MAD TV and then began broadcasting throughout Greek television. This single was the first to be composed by Phoebus to her since 1997. It marked a high point in her career as it held the number 1 position of the IFPI Singles Chart for a lot of weeks. The music video directed by Kostas Kapetanidis and released on 10 March 2000. The clip showcases first time Katy with red streaks over her black hair. The video itself is stylized using digital effects and over-contrasting colours that create surrealism. Scenes include Katy playing with and manipulating a group of shrunken men and a scene of her tearing up a photo of her real-life husband the moment he is mentioned in the song. The song was covered in 2017 by Greek artist, Eleni Foureira, retitled as "To Kati Pou Eheis".

"Alitaki Mou"

"Alitaki Mou" was the second single and released on 14 April 2000 and had good airplay.

"Epitelous"

Katy and Natasa in music video Epitelous

"Epitelous" was the third single and gained massive success. It encountered a lot of media coverage as it was a duet with two of the most successful artists of the industry, Katy Garbi and Natasa Theodoridou, both of whom have both collaborated with Phoebus. The duet proved particularly popular amongst women as the lyrics form a dialogue between two women about their frustrations with men and relationships. Directed by Kostas Kapetanidis, it would make its debut on MAD TV during Katy's appearance on the show OK on 25 May 2000. The music video carried the style of the previous clip with the over-contrasting of colours, however it had much more serious feel. Contrasting from a dark blue background, Katy and Natasa are seated on opposing sofa chairs which slowly spin around on their axes. Other shots of the video include shelves filled with various items that symbolize womanhood each carrying a price tag, depicting how everything comes with a price that is paid. On MAD TV's Greek music video countdown on Greekweek, "Epitelous" placed 18th on the "All Times Best Top 30 Video Clips" and at Pop Corn Music Awards won the "Best Duet Of The Year" award.

Katy in music video "To Lathos", filmed at 3× Platinum Certification in 2000

"To Lathos Mou"

"To Lathos Mou" was the fourth and last single and released on 20 October 2000. It is a pop-rock ballad, which became an iconic song detailing Katy's vocal abilities. Directed by Giorgos Gkavalos, it was shot on 6 October at the triple-platinum certification party for the album where Katy performed live to an outdoor audience of thousands at the Village Park in Athens. Scenes include Katy walking through the Virgin Megastore before and after her performance, Katy being interviewed by the media, fans singing along, and finally her departure from the venue through a rush of fans. Filming the performance took over 5 takes along with the audience.

== Credits ==
Credits adapted from liner notes.

=== Personnel ===
- Giannis Bithikotsis – bouzouki, baglama (tracks 2, 3, 4, 5) • cura (tracks 2, 4)
- Giorgos Chatzopoulos – guitars (1, 2, 3, 4, 5, 6, 7, 8)
- Pavlos Diamantopoulos – bass (tracks 2, 3, 4, 5, 6, 7)
- Akis Diximos – second vocal (track 6)
- Kostas Doxas – amane vocals (track 8)
- Katerina Kiriakou, Martha Zioga – backing vocals (tracks 1, 2, 4, 5, 6, 7)
- Fedon Lionoudakis – accordion (tracks 2, 3, 4)
- Andreas Mouzakis – drums (tracks 2, 3, 4, 5, 6)
- Phoebus – orchestration (all tracks) • programming, keyboards (tracks 1, 4, 6, 7, 8)
- Giorgos Roilos – percussion (tracks 2, 3, 4, 5, 6)
- Alexandros Vourazelis – programming, keyboards (tracks 2, 3, 5, 8)

=== Production ===
- Vasilis Bouloubasis – hair styling
- Doukas Chatzidoukas – styling
- Thodoris Chrisanthopoulos (Fabelsound) – mastering
- Costas Coutayar – photographer
- Giannis Doulamis – production manager
- Vanesa Koutsopodiotou – make up
- Dimitris Rekouniotis – art direction
- Vaggelis Siapatis, Giorgos Stabolis (Phase One studio) – sound engineer
- Katerina Sideridou – cover processing
- Manolis Vlachos (Phase One studio) – sound engineer, mix engineer
- Alexandros Vourazelis (Phase One studio) – sound engineer

== Charts ==
Chart	Providers	Peak Position	Certification
Greek Albums Chart	IFPI	1	4×Platinum
Cypriot Album Chart	Musical Paradise Top 10	1	3×Platinum

== Accolades ==
To Kati was gained two awards at the Pop Corn Music Awards 2000:

- "Best Dance Pop Song" (To Kati)
- "Best Duet Of The Year" (Epitelous with Natasa Theodoridou)
