= Apla Ta Pragmata =

Apla Ta Pragmata Απλά Τα Πράγματα

Studio album by Katy Garbi
- Released: December 17, 2001
- Genres: Pop, Modern Laika, Dance
- Length: 2:01:41
- Language: Greek
- Labels: Sony Music Greece; Columbia
- Producer: Giannis Doulamis

Katy Garbi chronology
Ti Theloune Ta Matia Sou (2000)	Apla Ta Pragmata; Απλά Τα Πράγματα (2001)	Mia Kardia (2002)

Singles from Apla Ta Pragmata
- 1. "Apla Ta Pragmata" Released: December 14, 2001; 2. "Otan Se Hreiazomai" Released: February 8, 2002; 3. "Viastika" Released: March 23, 2002; 4. "Thelo Apopse Na Horepso" Released: May 17, 2002; 5. "Kragion" Released: June 28, 2002

Apla Ta Pragmata (Greek: Απλά Τα Πράγματα; English: Things Are Simple) is the twelfth studio album by Greek artist, Katy Garbi. It was released on 17 December 2001 by Sony Music Greece and certified platinum in a month, but after months received double-platinum certification in Greece, selling over 120,000 units* (60,000^ albums). The album was written by various artists, but the most songs written by Nikos Terzis (ten songs from the first album) and Kostas Tournas (all the second album). It also contains two songs from previous platinum CD single Ti Theloune Ta Matia Sou, the title track and a re-performance of "Kane Ton Logariasmo". Dewar's whiskey was a main sponsor of the album, including sponsorship of the album's platinum certification party. From mid-January 2002, the album was released with other cover page for a few days.

* In 2001, double-platinum was the album whose sales exceeded 100,000 units.

== Track listing ==
Disc 1
No.	Title	Lyrics	Music	Length
1.	"Apla Ta Pragmata" (Απλά Τα Πράγματα; Things Are Simple)	Tasos Vougiatzis	Solon Apostolakis	3:16
2.	"Otan Se Hreiazomai" (Όταν Σε Χρειάζομαι; When I Need You)	Antonis Pappas	Nikos Terzis	4:05
3.	"Kragion" (Κραγιόν; Lipstick)	Dimitris Tsakalias	Dimitris Zbekos	4:08
4.	"Viastika" (Βιάστηκα; I Hurried)	Antonis Pappas	Nikos Terzis	4:57
5.	"Esi Tha Haseis" (Εσύ Θα Χάσεις; You Will Lose)	Natalia Germanou	Nikos Terzis	3:03
6.	"San Ton Ehthro" (Σαν Τον Εχθρό; Like The Enemy)	Nikos Gritsis	Takis Bougas	3:07
7.	"Pes To (Xana) M' Ena Fili" (Πες Το (Ξανά) Μ' Ένα Φιλί; Say It (Again) With A Kiss)	Natalia Germanou	Nikos Terzis	4:51
8.	"Adiko Kai Krima (ft. Antique)" (Άδικο Και Κρίμα; Unfair And A Pity)	Antonis Pappas	Nikos Terzis	5:30
9.	"Kanenas Den Anikei Se Kanena" (Κανένας Δεν Ανήκει Σε Κανένα; Nobody Belongs To Anyone)	Antonis Pappas	Nikos Terzis	3:56
10.	"Akatallili Agapi" (Ακατάλληλη Αγάπη; Inappropriate Love)	Lila Zervopoulou	Dimitris Zbekos	3:22
11.	"Thelo Apopse Na Horepso" (Θέλω Απόψε Να Χορέψω; I Want To Dance Tonight)	Efstathia	Dimitris Zbekos	3:32
12.	"Afto Pou Zisame" (Αυτό Που Ζήσαμε; That Which We Lived Through)	Natalia Germanou	Nikos Terzis	4:17
13.	"To Savvatokiriako Sou" (Το Σαββατοκύριακο Σου; Your Weekend)	Dimitris Zbekos; Efstathia	Dimitris Zbekos	3:46
14.	"Pou Na Krifto" (Που Να Κρυφτώ; Where Can I Hide?)	Tasos Vougiatzis	Nikos Terzis	3:55
15.	"Xenihtao" (Ξενυχτάω; I Stay Up At Night)	Tasos Vougiatzis	Nikos Terzis	3:53
16.	"Vasei Logikis" (Βάσει Λογικής; Logical Base)	Ilias Philippou	Tasos Panagis	3:18
17.	"Arga - Arga" (Αργά - Αργά; Slowly - Slowly)	Foteini Dourou	Michalis Touratzdis	4:16
18.	"You And Me, You And I"	Antonis Pappas	Nikos Terzis	4:41
Total length:				1:11:52

Disc 2
No.	Title	Lyrics	Music	Length
1.	"Den Eipa Psemata Pote [Mono Gia Sena]" (Δεν Είπα Ψέματα Ποτέ [Μόνο Για Σένα]; I've Never Lied [Only For You])	Kostas Tournas	Kostas Tournas	3:45
2.	"Sto Skonismeno Sou Amaxi" (Στο Σκονισμένο Σου Αμάξι; In Your Dusty Car)	Panos Falaras	Kostas Tournas	3:46
3.	"Zitas" (Ζητάς; You Ask)	Kostas Tournas	Kostas Tournas	3:47
4.	"Oso Tha Leipeis" (Όσο Θα Λείπεις; When You'll Be Gone)	Kostas Tournas	Kostas Tournas	3:25
5.	"Thelo Na Se Vlepo" (Θέλω Να Σε Βλέπω; I Want To See You)	Kostas Tournas	Kostas Tournas	3:25
6.	"Fila Me" (Φίλα Με; Kiss Me)	Kostas Tournas	Kostas Tournas	3:55
7.	"Moni Mou" (Μόνη Μου; By Myself)	Kostas Tournas	Kostas Tournas	3:51
8.	"Kane Ton Logariasmo" (Κάνε Τον Λογαριασμό; Make The Bill)	Kostas Tournas	Kostas Tournas	3:34
9.	"Stahti" (Στάχτη; Ash)	Kostas Tournas	Kostas Tournas	3:39
10.	"Vale" (Βάλε; Put It There)	Kostas Tournas	Kostas Tournas	4:04
11.	"Stigmes (ft. Kostas Tournas)" (Στιγμές; Moments)	Kostas Tournas	Kostas Tournas	4:15
12.	"Epanastasi" (Επανάσταση; Revolution)	Kostas Tournas	Kostas Tournas	4:11
13.	"Ti Theloune Ta Matia Sou (ft. Exis)" (Τι Θέλουνε Τα Μάτια Σου; What Do Your Eyes Want)	Giannis Kalpouzos	Spiros Kontakis	4:11
Total length:				49:49

== Singles ==
The following singles were officially released to radio stations with music videos, except the songs "Otan Se Hreiazomai" and "Kragion". The songs "San Ton Ehthro", "Pes To (Xana) M' Ena Fili", "Akatallili Agapi" and "Mono Gia Sena" were not released as singles, but gained a lot of airplay.

"Apla Ta Pragmata"

After the success of last single "Ti Theloune Ta Matia Sou", released after one year the first single "Apla Ta Pragmata" with music video on 14 December 2001 with the album's release. It marked at number 1 position of the IFPI Singles Chart for a lot of weeks. The music video directed by Giorgos Gkavalos and is shot using chroma key with a motion background of a computer generated futuristic city and shows Katy dressed in a variety of outfits. As part of Dewar's Whiskey 2002 Greece campaign, the whiskey company sponsored the release of the following final two music videos via product placement.

"Otan Se Hreiazomai"

"Otan Se Hreiazomai" was the second single and released on 8 February 2002 and had a success airplay.

"Viastika"

"Viastika" was the third single and gained massive success. It spawned a popular music video directed by Kostas Kapetanidis, in which portrays Katy's struggle to rid herself of her memories, thereby she drives a car through a tall stack of forty-five televisions each displaying a different recollection from her memory. As a result of the collision the televisions crash to the ground and would make its debut on MAD TV on 23 March 2002. The video clip produced a marked contrast with the lyrics that speak about emotions of frustration, anger, tiredness and regret, while the video portrays a more rigid and self-confident Katy.

"Thelo Apopse Na Horepso"

"Thelo Apopse Na Horepso" was the fourth single and released on 17 May 2002. It is a catchy tsifteteli with a distinct modern laiko feel and did make its way onto the Billboard singles charts, and became quite successful. Directed by Kostas Kapetanidis, it would coincide with Katy's winter collaboration at Club Iera Odos with Paschalis Terzis, so Kapetanidis decided he would showcase her performance of song within the atmosphere of Club Iera Odos. It also debuted on MAD TV.

"Kragion"

"Kragion" was the fifth and last single and released on 28 June 2002 and had good airplay.

== Credits ==
Credits adapted from liner notes.

=== Personnel ===
- Antonis Andreou – trombone (CD1 track 18)
- Hakan Bingolou – oud, säz (CD1 track 10 // CD2 track 4)
- Giannis Bithikotsis – bouzouki, cura, baglama (CD1 tracks 4, 14 // CD2 tracks 1, 3, 8)
- Victoria Chalkiti – backing vocals (CD1 tracks 2, 4, 5, 7, 9, 12, 18)
- Nikos Chatzopoulos – violin (CD1 tracks 2, 3 // CD2 track 4)
- Vasilis Diamantis – clarinet (CD2 track 7)
- Akis Diximos – second vocal (CD1 tracks 4, 6, 10, 13, 14, 16 // CD2 tracks 1, 3, 7, 8)
- Kostas Doxas – amane vocals (CD1 track 17)
- Giorgos Fotopoulos – drums (CD2 track 13)
- Vasilis Gkinos – orchestration, programming, keyboards (CD1 track 1, 3, 6, 10, 11, 13, 16 // CD2 tracks 2, 4, 5, 9)
- Stelios Goulielmos, Anna Ioannidou – backing vocals (CD1 tracks 2, 4, 5, 7, 9, 15, 18)
- Antonis Gounaris – orchestration, programming, guitars (CD1 track 17 // CD2 tracks 1, 3, 7, 8) • cura (CD2 track 7)
- Vasilis Iliadis – säz (CD1 track 8)
- Katerina Kiriakou, Paola Komini, Alex Panayi – backing vocals (CD1 tracks 1, 3, 11, 17 // CD2 tracks 2, 5, 9, 12)
- Spiros Kontakis – orchestration (CD2 track 13) • guitars (CD1 tracks 6, 10, 11, 13, 16 // CD2 tracks 2, 9, 13)
- Giorgos Kostoglou – bass (CD1 tracks 2, 4, 6, 9, 10, 11, 13, 14, 16 // CD2 tracks 1, 2, 3, 8)
- Antonis Koulouris – drums (CD1 tracks 2, 4, 6, 9, 10, 11, 13, 14, 16 // CD2 tracks 1, 2, 3, 8)
- Stavros Lantsias – orchestration, programming, keyboards (CD2 track 11)
- Christos Pertsinidis – guitars (CD1 tracks 2, 4, 5, 7, 9, 14)
- Pimis Petrou – orchestration, programming, keyboards (CD tracks 6, 10) • backing vocals (CD2 track 6)
- Nikos Sakellarakis – trumpet (CD1 track 18)
- Soumka – programming, keyboards (CD2 track 13)
- Panagiotis Stergiou – bouzouki (CD1 tracks 6, 11, 16) • cura (CD1 tracks 6, 9, 13, 16) • baglama (CD1 tracks 6, 16)
- Nikos Terzis – orchestration, keyboards (CD1 tracks 2, 4, 5, 7, 8, 9, 12, 14, 15, 18) • programming (CD1 tracks 8, 12)
- Kostas Tournas – orchestration, programming, keyboards (CD2 track 12)
- Fanis Tsirakis – programming (CD1 tracks 2, 4, 5, 7, 9, 14, 15, 18)
- Dimitris Tsopanellis – guitars (CD2 track 11)
- Thanasis Vasilopoulos – clarinet (CD1 track 10) • ney (CD2 track 4)
- Barry Zealey – bass (CD2 track 13)
- Dimitris Zogkas – keyboards (CD1 track 17 // CD2 tracks 1, 3, 7, 8)

=== Production ===
- Takis Argiriou (111 studio) – sound engineer (CD1 tracks 1, 3, 6, 10, 11, 13, 16, 17) • mix engineer (CD1 tracks 1, 3, 6, 10, 11, 13, 16, 17 // CD2 tracks 2, 4, 5, 9)
- Christos Avdelas, Soumka (C&C studio) – sound engineer, mix engineer (CD2 track 13)
- Thodoris Chrisanthopoulos (Fabelsound) – mastering
- Giannis Doulamis – production manager
- Kostas Giannakopoulos (City studio) – mix engineer (CD2 track 11)
- Al Giga – styling
- Vaggelis Kiris – photographer
- Dimitris Malegkas (City studio) – sound engineer (CD2 track 11)
- Lefteris Neromiliotis (Sofita studio) – sound engineer, mix engineer (CD1 tracks 2, 4, 5, 7, 8, 9, 12, 14, 15, 18)
- Dimitris Rekouniotis – art direction
- Christos Peltekis, Giannis Tountas (City studio) – sound engineer (CD2 tracks 1, 2, 3, 4, 5, 6, 7, 8, 9, 10, 11, 12) • mix engineer (CD2 tracks 1, 3, 6, 7, 8, 10, 12)
- Katerina Sideridou – cover processing
- Stefanos Vasilakis – hair styling
- Manos Vynichakis – make up

== Charts ==
Apla Ta Pragmata made its debut at number 1 on the 'Top 50 Greek Albums' charts by IFPI.

In a month, it was certified platinum and later was certified double-platinum according to sales.

Chart	Providers	Peak Position	Certification
Greek Albums Chart	IFPI	1	2×Platinum
Cypriot Album Chart	Musical Paradise Top 10	1	2×Platinum

== Accolades ==
Apla Ta Pragmata received an award at the Arion Music Awards 2002:

- Best Modern Laiko Singer (alongside Natasa Theodoridou)
