= Pos Allazei O Kairos =

Pos Allazei O Kairos Πως Αλλάζει Ο Καιρός

Studio album by Katy Garbi
- Released: 23 October 2006
- Genre: Pop, Modern Laika
- Length: 1:17:05
- Language: Greek
- Label: Sony BMG Greece; RCA
- Producer: The Team

Katy Garbi chronology
Eho Sta Matia Ourano (2005)	Pos Allazei O Kairos; Πως Αλλάζει Ο Καιρός (2006)	18 Hronia Live (2007)

Singles from Pos Allazei O Kairos
- 1. "Isovios Desmos" Released: 17 July 2006; 2. "Pos Allazei O Kairos" Released: 16 October 2006; 3. "Afti" Released: 12 February 2007; 4. "Ta Paidika Sou Matia" Released: 16 April 2007; 5. "Poios Eisai Esi" Released: 18 June 2007

Pos Allazei O Kairos (Greek: Πως Αλλάζει Ο Καιρός; English: How The Weather Changes) is the fifteenth studio album by Greek artist Katy Garbi. It was released on 23 October 2006 by Sony BMG Greece and received gold certification, selling over 20,000 units*. The album is her only album to carry a modern laika genre throughout its complete track listing, and this did not incorporate her past pop and dance genre which were found to be successful in previous releases, containing many of her most successful songs, like "Afti", "Pos Allazei O Kairos", "Ta Paidika Sou Matia" and "Isovios Desmos". It is her only album to date to carry the RCA Records logo as an imprint, as all of her past releases were under the Columbia imprint. The album did not turn out to be a smash hit for Garbi, but was able to chart for weeks on the Greek Albums Chart peaking at number 5. It was also certified gold the following year, and its title track has been announced as the 8th most successful Greek airplay track of the 2000s on Alpha's Chart Show Countdown. It was promoted in some way in the series Epta Thanasimes Petheres of Mega Channel, where she portrayed the main character of a 3-episode story.

* In 2006, gold was the album whose sales exceeded 15,000 units.

== Track listing ==
No.	Title	Lyrics	Music	Length
1.	"Afti" (Αυτή; Her)	Andreas Bonatsos	Andreas Bonatsos	3:19
2.	"Ego Eimai Edo" (Εγώ Είμαι Εδώ; I'm Here)	Niki Spiropoulou	Giorgos Alkaios	4:34
3.	"Pos Allazei O Kairos (Anemos)" (Πως Αλλάζει Ο Καιρός (Άνεμος); How The Weather Changes (Wind))	Pegasus	Pegasus	4:07
4.	"Anemodeiktis (Na Mou Leipei)" (Ανεμοδείκτης (Να Μου Λείπει); Wind Vane (To Be Missing It "your love"))	Nikos Sarris	Αntonis Skokos	4:00
5.	"Hari Sou Kano" (Χάρη Σου Κάνω; I'm Doing You A Favour)	Nikos Sarris	Antonis Skokos	3:19
6.	"To Meta Fovamai" (Το Μετά Φοβάμαι; I'm Scared of the Afterward)	Andreas Bonatsos	Andreas Bonatsos	3:39
7.	"Ohi Emeis" (Όχι Εμείς; Not Us)	Andreas Bonatsos	Andreas Bonatsos	3:00
8.	"Ta Paidika Sou Matia" (Τα Παιδικά Σου Μάτια; Your Childish Eyes)	Pegasus	Pegasus	3:33
9.	"De M' Agapas" (Δε Μ' Αγαπάς; You Don't Love Me)	Andreas Bonatsos	Andreas Bonatsos	4:07
10.	"I Eleftheria Mou" (Η Ελευθερία Μου; My Liberty)	Christos Satanidis	Christos Satanidis	3:47
11.	"Apagorevetai" (Απαγορεύεται; It's Forbidden)	Andreas Bonatsos	Andreas Bonatsos	3:31
12.	"Koroido Piastikes" (Κορόιδο Πιάστηκες; You've Been Made A Fool Of)	Pegasus	Pegasus	3:33
13.	"Kai Tha Me Parakaleseis" (Και Θα Με Παρακαλέσεις; And You'll Beg Me)	Andreas Bonatsos	Andreas Bonatsos	3:56
14.	"Isovios Desmos (ft. Stathis Raftopoulos)" (Ισόβιος Δεσμός; Lifelong Bond)	Pegasus	Pegasus	4:42
15.	"Esi Eisai Opos O Kairos" (Εσύ Είσαι Όπως Ο Καιρός; You're Like The Weather)	Smaroula Maragkoudaki	Panagiotis Stergiou	3:36
16.	"Allothi" (Άλλοθι; Alibi)	Niki Spiropoulou	Giorgos Alkaios	4:55
17.	"Poios Eisai Esi" (Ποιος Είσαι Εσύ; Who Are You)	Giannis Liontos	Panagiotis Stergiou	3:35
18.	"Kala Kano Kai Klaio" (Καλά Κάνω Και Κλαίω; I'm Doing Good For Crying)	Andreas Bonatsos	Andreas Bonatsos	3:31
19.	"Diamantoskoni" (Διαμαντόσκονη; Diamond Dust)	Nikos Sarris	Antonis Skokos	4:43
20.	"To Meta Fovamai (Karaoke)" (Το Μετά Φοβάμαι (Karaoke); I'm Scared of the Afterward (Karaoke))		Andreas Bonatsos	3:38
Total length:				1:17:05

== Singles ==
The following singles were officially released to radio stations with music videos, except the songs "Isovios Desmos" and "Poios Eisai Esi". The songs "Na Mou Leipei" and "Hari Sou Kano" were not released as singles, but gained airplay.

"Isovios Desmos"

"Isovios Desmos" was the lead single and released on 17 July 2006. With Katy as one of the permanent judges on the final installment of Fame Story 4, at various times she used the show to announce exclusive news about her latest discographical movements, such as her collaboration with contestant Stathis Raftopoulos, where their duet and premiered on the show.

"Pos Allazei O Kairos"

The title-track was the second single and released with music video, directed by Manolis Tzirakis, a few days before the album's release on 16 October 2006. Paschalis Terzis, a popular Laika artist, performs the second vocal in the song. The video clip portrays a blonde Katy in a mansion furnished in antiquities. It gained massive airplay and the first place as the song with the most radio airplay on 00's.

Katy in music video for Afti

"Afti"

"Afti" was the third single and released with music video, directed by Giorgos Gkavalos, on 12 February 2007. It managed to make its way onto the Greek IFPI singles charts, however it received only successful radio airplay. The video clip was filmed in January and features two depictions of Katy in the same frame using special effects. The second Katy represents the other woman who she refers to as "Afti" in the lyrics; the woman set on taking away her man.

"Ta Paidika Sou Matia"

"Ta Paidika Sou Matia" was the fourth single and released on 16 April 2007 and had a successful airplay until today.

"Poios Eisai Esi"

"Poios Eisai Esi" was the last single and released on 18 June 2007 and had a good airplay.

== Credits ==
Credits adapted from liner notes.

=== Personnel ===
- Giorgos Alkaios – orchestration, programming, keyboards (2, 16)
- Kostas Anadiotis – orchestration, programming, keyboards (1, 7, 9, 11, 13, 18)
- Giannis Aninos – bass (3)
- Dimitris Antoniou – guitars (2, 16)
- Stavros Apostolou – backing vocals (2, 4, 16)
- Mohamend Arafa – percussion (4, 19)
- Thomas Blindberg – bass (6)
- Andreas Bonatsos – programming, keyboards, backing vocals (1, 7, 9, 11, 13, 18)
- Giorgos Chatzopoulos – guitars (11, 18)
- Savvas Christodoulou – guitars (3, 8, 12, 14)
- Vasilis Diamantis – clarinet (19)
- Thanasis Dimopoulos – backing vocals (10)
- Spiros Dorizas – drums (4, 5, 19)
- Marcus Englof – orchestration, guitars (6)
- Froso Glitsou – cello (13)
- Fotis Giannopoulos – drums (15, 17)
- Spiros Glenis – percussion (10)
- Giannis Grigoriou – bass (8, 12, 14)
- Emil Heiling – backing vocals (6)
- Telis Kafkas – bass (15, 17)
- Michalis Kapilidis – drums (3)
- Olga Karagianni – backing vocals (2, 4, 16)
- Giorgos Karagiannis – programming (4, 5, 19) / bouzouki, cura (4, 5, 19) / baglama (5, 19) / backing vocals (2, 4, 16) / second vocal (5)
- Manolis Karantinis – bouzouki (3) / lute (14)
- Vaggelis Karipis – percussion (14)
- Kempa – strings (14)
- Katerina Kiriakou – backing vocals (1, 2, 4, 7, 9, 11, 13, 16, 18)
- Paola Komini – backing vocals (1, 6, 7, 9, 13, 18)
- Giorgos Kostoglou – bass (1, 7, 9, 13)
- Andreas Kostopoulos – bass (4, 5, 19)
- Kostas Lainas – orchestration, programming, keyboards (15, 17)
- Giannis Lazarou – backing vocals (15)
- Kostas Liolios – drums (1, 7, 9, 13)
- Selmani Migen – violin (3)
- Andreas Mouzakis – drums (10)
- Arsenis Nasis – percussion (1, 11, 18)
- Alex Panagi – backing vocals (6)
- Thimios Papadopoulos – orchestration at strings (14)
- Alex Papakonstantinou – programming, keyboards (6)
- Liana Papalexi – backing vocals (8, 12)
- Stavros Pazarentsis – clarinet (15)
- Pegasus – orchestration, programming, keyboards (3, 8, 12, 14) / guitars (12) / backing vocals (8, 12)
- Christos Pertsinidis – guitars (1, 7, 9, 11, 13, 18)
- Kostas Platakis – cura (10)
- Michalis Porfiris – cello (3)
- Dimitris Reppas – bouzouki (2, 16)
- Nikos Sarris – guitars (4, 5, 19)
- Antonis Skokos – orchestration, keyboards (4, 5, 19)
- Panagiotis Stergiou – guitars (15, 17) / bouzouki (1, 8, 9, 12, 13, 15, 17) / cura (8, 15) / baglama (9, 13, 17)
- Paschalis Terzis – second vocal (3)
- Giorgos Tzivelekis – bass (10)
- Iraklis Vavatsikas – accordion (8)
- Thanasis Vichos – orchestration, programming, keyboards (10)
- Irini Zei – backing vocals (15)

=== Production ===
- Takis Argiriou (111 studio) – sound engineer, mix engineer (15, 17)
- Antonis Aspromourgos – cover processing
- Kostas Avgoulis – photographer
- Aris Binis (Vox studio) – sound engineer, mix engineer (1, 6, 7, 9, 11, 13, 18)
- Dimitris Dimitroulis – make up
- Eva Georgiou – styling
- Giannis Ioannidis (Digital Press Hellas) – mastering
- Vasilis Korres (Kiriazis studio) – sound engineer (3, 8, 12, 14)
- Ilias Lakkas (Kiriazis studio) – mix engineer (3, 8, 12, 14)
- Lefteris Neromiliotis (Sofita studio) – sound engineer, mix engineer (2, 4, 5, 10, 16, 19)
- Panos Pitsilidis – art direction
- The Team – production manager
- Petros Siakavellas (Digital Press Hellas) – mastering
- Dimitris Skoulos – photographer
- Stefanos Vasilakis – hair styling

== Charts ==
Pos Allazei O Kairos made its debut at number 5 on the 'Top 50 Greek Albums' charts by IFPI.

After months, it was certified gold according to sales.

Chart	Providers	Peak position	Certification
Greek Albums Chart	IFPI	5	Gold
Cypriot Album Chart	Musical Paradise Top 10	4	Gold
