= Emmones Idees =

Emmones Idees Έμμονες Ιδέες

Studio album by Katy Garbi
- Released: October 17, 2003
- Genres: Pop, Modern Laika, Dance
- Length: 1:01:52
- Language: Greek
- Labels: Sony Music Greece; Columbia
- Producer: Giannis Doulamis

Katy Garbi chronology
Mia Kardia (2002)	Emmones Idees; Έμμονες Ιδέες (2003)	Galazio Kai Lefko + Remixes (2004)

Singles from Emmones Idees
- 1. "Na Pernas" Released: September 1, 2003; 2. "Poso Tha 'Thela" Released: October 6, 2003; 3. "Antres" Released: November 3, 2003; 4. "Esena Mono" Released: December 8, 2003; 5. "Ta Ripsokindina" Released: February 2, 2004; 6. "Apsiha Pragmata" Released: March 29, 2004; 7. "Emmones Idees Medley" Released: May 31, 2004

Emmones Idees (Greek: Έμμονες Ιδέες; English: Obsessive Ideas) is the thirteenth studio album by Greek artist, Katy Garbi. It was released on 17 October 2003 by Sony Music Greece and certified gold in a week, but after a month received platinum certification, selling over 60,000 units*. The first single "Na Pernas" and precursor to the album was released over one month prior to the release of the album, which itself was initially scheduled to be released in September, but it was delayed to October, containing many of her most successful songs like "Na Pernas", "Antres", "Esena Mono" and "Poso Tha 'Thela". "Ilios I Vrohi" is a cover of Youm Wara Youm, previously recorded and performed as a duet by Samira Said and Cheb Mami. It was available in two different versions: a standard 16-track version, and a "Limited Edition" packaged with a bonus DVD including Mia Kardia's music videos along with biography, discography and photos. Giannis Doulamis with Dewar's whiskey, a main sponsor of the album, organized a big celebration for the presentation of Katy's new gold album (were sold more than 30,000 units in the first week of release alone) as well as the multi-platinum award for her previous albums.

* In 2003, platinum was the album whose sales exceeded 40,000 units.

== Track listing ==
Disc 1 (CD)
No.	Title	Lyrics	Music	Length
1.	"Na Pernas" (Να Περνάς; You Pass By)	Smaroula Maragkoudaki	Spiros Georgiou	3:18
2.	"Poso Tha 'Thela (ft. Giannis Vardis)" (Πόσο Θα 'Θελα; How Much I Want)	Dimitris Kontopoulos	Dimitris Kontopoulos	4:40
3.	"Antres" (Άντρες; Men)	Natalia Germanou	Nikos Terzis	3:28
4.	"Emmones Idees" (Έμμονες Ιδέες; Obsessive Ideas)	Ilias Philippou	Energee	4:41
5.	"Esena Mono" (Εσένα Μόνο; Only You)	Nikos Gritsis	Eldar Mansurov(Azerbaijan)	2:57
6.	"Ilios I Vrohi" (Ήλιος Ή Βροχή; Sun Or Rain)	Giannis Doxas	Haled Taj; Amar Mustafa	4:00
7.	"Ta Ripsokindina" (Τα Ριψοκίνδυνα; The Reckless)	Vaggelis Kostantinidis	Stratos Diamantis	4:42
8.	"De S' Agapaei" (Δε Σ' Αγαπάει; He Doesn't Love You)	Antonis Pappas	Panos Kapiris	3:39
9.	"Apsiha Pragmata" (Άψυχα Πράγματα; Lifeless Things)	Smaroula Maragkoudaki	Spiros Georgiou	4:06
10.	"Ola Tha Ta Gkremiso" (Όλα Θα Τα Γκρεμίσω; I Will Destroy Everything)	Nikos Gritsis	Dimitris Kontopoulos	3:30
11.	"Parata Me, Loipon" (Παράτα Με, Λοιπόν; Leave Me, Then)	Zoi Gripari	Spiros Georgiou	2:55
12.	"Stenahoriemai" (Στεναχωριέμαι; I Am worried)	Evi Droutsa	Marios Psimopoulos	3:19
13.	"Apopse, Thee Mou, Anapse T' Asteria" (Απόψε, Θεέ μου, Άναψε Τ' Αστέρια; Tonight, My God, Light Up The Stars)	Elena Milona	Spiros Georgiou	4:18
14.	"Kanonika" (Κανονικά; Correct)	Tasos Vougiatzis	Solon Apostolakis	4:09
15.	"Mia Nihta Akoma" (Μια Νύχτα Ακόμα; One More Night)	Zoi Gripari	Spiros Georgiou	3:35
16.	"Zilia" (Ζήλια; Jealous)	Natalia Germanou	Dimitris Kontopoulos	4:35
Total length:				1:01:52

Disc 2 (DVD)
No.	Title	Lyrics	Music	Length
1.	"M' Eheis Arrostisei" (Μ' Έχεις Αρρωστήσει; You Got Sick Me)	Panos Falaras	Kostas Miliotakis	4:43
2.	"Tha Meinei Metaxi Mas (ft. Giorgos Tsalikis)" (Θα Μείνει Μεταξύ Μας; It'll Be Stay Between Us)	Panos Falaras	Kostas Miliotakis	4:20
3.	"Making Of (Featurette)"			3:04
4.	"M' Eheis Arrostisei" (Μ' Έχεις Αρρωστήσει; You Got Sick Me)	Panos Falaras	Kostas Miliotakis	4:44
5.	"Tha Meinei Metaxi Mas (ft. Giorgos Tsalikis)" (Θα Μείνει Μεταξύ Μας; It'll Be Stay Between Us)	Panos Falaras	Kostas Miliotakis	4:21
6.	"Mia Kardia Tin Eho" (Μια Καρδιά Την Έχω; I Have A Heart)	Tasos Vougiatzis	Christos Dantis	4:14
7.	"Photo Gallery (Slideshow)"			1:03
Total length:				26:29

== Notes ==
- There is a gap of 22 seconds between tracks 15 and 16. "Mia Nihta Akoma" last 3:13.
- "Zilia" was not listed on the back cover of the album.

== Singles ==
The following singles were officially released to radio stations with music videos, except the songs "Antres" and "Ta Ripsokindina". The songs "Emmones Idees", "Stenahoriemai" and "Zilia" were not released as singles, but gained a lot of airplay.

"Na Pernas"

"Na Pernas" was the lead single and released on 1 September 2003 with music video. Some scenes was filmed at Thessaloniki's port. It gained massive radio airplay and making airplay every hour for a year.

"Poso Tha 'Thela"

"Poso Tha 'Thela" was the second single and released on 6 October 2003 with music video. The duet has a successful airplay until today.

"Antres"

"Antres" was the third single and released on 3 November 2003 having a lot of airplay.

"Esena Mono"

"Esena Mono" was the fourth single from the album and released on 8 December 2003 with music video which filmed at London with her husband, Dionisis. The original music was composed by Azerbaijani composer, Eldar Mansurov in 1988. The song had a massive success and is considered one of the most successful ballads of the decade.

"Ta Ripsokindina"

"Ta Ripsokindina" was the fifth single and released on 2 February 2004 having a good airplay.

"Apsiha Pragmata"

"Apsiha Pragmata" was the sixth single and released on 29 March 2004. The music video was directed by Victoria Vellopoulou, due to Katy's film concerts at the ODEON KOSMOPOLIS cinema in the fall of 2012 and released on 25 October 2015, 12 years after its release.

"Emmones Idees [Medley]"

"Emmones Idees [Medley]" was the seventh and last single and released on 31 May 2004 with music video. It is a mix of 3 songs of album ("Apopse, Thee Mou, Anapse T' Asteria", "Ta Ripsokindina", "De S' Agapaei") which were in the radio's choices.

== Copyright controversies ==
Mansurov sued Dimitris Kontopulos (composer) and Sony Music Entertainment Hellas AE (publisher) for stealing his original work in 2011. The Greek court said that the similarity between 2 songs are more than 50 percent. The entire process finished in 2023 in favor of Mansurov.

== Credits ==
Credits adapted from liner notes.

=== Personnel ===
- Dimitris Antoniou – guitars (tracks 3, 12)
- Mohamend Arafa – percussion (track 5)
- Giannis Bithikotsis – bouzouki, cura, baglama (track 7)
- Victoria Chalkiti – backing vocals (track 16)
- Panagiotis Charamis – bass (track 7)
- Nikos Chatzopoulos – violin (tracks 3, 12)
- Achilleas Diamantis – guitars (track 7)
- Stratos Diamantis – orchestration, programming, keyboards (tracks 6, 7)
- Dimos Emmanouel, Konstantinos Emmanouel – backing vocals (track 1)
- Galleon – orchestration, programming, keyboards (track 10)
- Spiros Georgiou – orchestration, programming, keyboards (tracks 1, 9, 11, 13, 15)
- Thanos Gkiouletzis – violin (tracks 9, 15)
- Telis Kafkas – bass (tracks 1, 4, 8, 9, 11, 13, 14, 15)
- Panos Kapiris – second vocal (tracks 8, 14)
- Manolis Karantinis – bouzouki (tracks 1, 11, 13) • cura, baglama (tracks 1, 13) • lute (track 15)
- Katerina Kiriakou – backing vocals (tracks 1, 3, 6, 7, 12)
- Giannis Konstantinidis – guitars (track 5)
- Spiros Kontakis – guitars (tracks 2, 16)
- Dimitris Kontopoulos – orchestration, programming, keyboards (tracks 2, 5, 16)
- Kostas Lainas – keyboards (tracks 4, 8, 14)
- Giannis Lionakis – orchestration, programming, guitars (tracks 4, 8, 14)
- Andreas Mouzakis – drums (tracks 1, 11, 13, 15)
- Vasilis Nikolopoulos – drums (track 7)
- Alex Panagi – backing vocals (tracks 3, 6, 7, 12, 16)
- Christos Pertsinidis – guitars (tracks 1, 9, 11, 13, 15)
- Marios Psimopoulos – orchestration, programming, keyboards (track 12)
- Antonis Remos – second vocal (track 4)
- Panagiotis Stergiou – bouzouki, baglama (tracks 4, 8, 14)
- Nikos Terzis – orchestration, programming, keyboards (track 3)
- Lakis Tsiatsiamis – drums (tracks 4, 8, 14)

=== Production ===
- Aris Binis (Sofita studio) – sound engineer, mix engineer (tracks 4, 8, 14)
- Giannis Doulamis – production manager
- Nikolas Georgiou – styling
- Giannis Ioannidis, Petros Siakavellas (Digital Press Hellas) – mastering
- Nikos Iosifidis (G studio) – sound engineer, mix engineer (tracks 1, 9, 11, 13, 15)
- Kostas Kalimeris (Prism studio) – mix engineer (tracks 2, 5, 10, 16)
- Dimitris Kontopoulos (Vox studio) – sound engineer (tracks 2, 5, 10, 16)
- Lefteris Neromiliotis (Sofita studio) – sound engineer, mix engineer (tracks 3, 4, 8, 12, 14)
- Vasilis Nikolopoulos (Power Music studio) – sound engineer, mix engineer (tracks 6, 7)
- Petros Paraschis – art direction
- Christos Prentoulis – photographer
- Despina Triantafillidou – cover processing
- Stefanos Vasilakis – hair styling
- Manos Vynichakis – make up

== Charts ==
Emmones Idees made its debut at number 1 on the 'Top 50 Greek Albums' charts by IFPI. In a week, it was certified gold and later was certified platinum according to sales.

Chart	Providers	Peak Position	Certification
Greek Albums Chart	IFPI	1	Platinum
Cypriot Album Chart	Musical Paradise Top 10	1	Platinum
