= Mando discography =

Singer discography

This page includes the discography of the Greek singer Mando.

== Albums ==
=== Studio albums ===
- * denotes unknown or unavailable information.

Year	Album details	Peak chart positions		Sales	Certifications (sales thresholds)
Year	Album details	GRE	CYP	Sales	Certifications (sales thresholds)
1989	Dos Mou Ena Fili... Afto to Kalokairi: Released: 1989; Label: Minos (#CK-45202); Formats: LP, Cassette, CD			World: *	GRE: *; CYP: *
1990	Ptisi Gia Dio: Released: 1990; Label: Minos (#CK-45202); Formats: LP, Cassette, CD	*	*	World: *	GRE: *; CYP: *
1991	Kinisi Triti: Released: 1991; Label: Minos (#CK-45202); Formats: LP, Cassette, CD			World: *	GRE: CYP:
1992	Esthisis: Released: 1992; Label: Minos (#CK-45202); Formats: LP, Cassette, CD	*	*	World: *	GRE: CYP:
1993	I Diki Mas I Agapi: Released: 1993; Label: Minos (#CK-45202); Formats: LP, Cassette, CD			World: *	GRE: *; CYP: *
1994	Anisiho Vlemma: Released: 1994; Label: Minos (#CK-45202); Formats: LP, Cassette, CD			World:	GRE: *; CYP: *
1995	I Mando Ston Evdomo Ourano: Released: October, 1995; Label: Sony Music, CBS (#CK-45202); Formats: LP, Cassette, CD			World:	GRE: *; CYP: *
1997	Gia Oles Tis Fores: Released: June, 1997; Label: Sony Music, CBS (#CK-45202); Formats: LP, Cassette, CD			World:	GRE: *; CYP: *
1998	Prodosia: Released: November, 1998; Label: Sony Music, CBS (#CK-45202); Formats: Cassette, CD	*	*	World: *	GRE: CYP:
2000	Se Alli Diastasi: Released: September, 2000; Label: Sony Music, CBS (#CK-45202); Formats: Cassette, CD			World:	GRE: *; CYP: *
2003	Oi Agapes Fevgoun, Ta Tragoudia Menoun: Released: December, 2003; Label: Alpha Records (#CK-45202); Formats: Cassette, CD			World: *	GRE: *; CYP: *
2008	Mando II: Released: May 30, 2008; Label: Polymusic (#CK-45202); Formats: CD, Digital Download	10	8	World: *	GRE: Gold; CYP: Gold
2011	Perfection: Released: September 2011; Label: Polymusic (#CK-45202); Formats: CD, Digital Download	*	*	World: *	GRE: *; CYP: *
"—" denotes releases that did not chart or was not released

== Official compilations ==
- * denotes unknown or unavailable information.

Year	Album details	Peak chart positions		Sales	Certifications (sales thresholds)
Year	Album details	GRE	CYP	Sales	Certifications (sales thresholds)
2003	Oi Megaliteres Epityhies: Released: March, 2003; Label: Sony Music, CBS (#CK-45202); Formats: Cassette, CD	*	*	World: *	GRE: *; CYP: *
