= List of awards and nominations received by Antonis Remos =

Antonis Remos awards and nominations
Awards and nominations
Award	Wins	Nominations
Arion Music Awards	12	19
Cyprus Music Awards	4	2
MAD Video Music Awards	5	5
Pop Coron Music Awards	4	9
Status Man of the Year Awards	3	0

Totals (Note: Certain award groups do not simply award one winner. They acknowledge several different recipients, have runners-up, and have third place. Since this is a specific recognition and is different from losing an award, runner-up mentions are considered wins in this award tally. For simplification and to avoid errors, each award in this list has been presumed to have had a prior nomination.)
- Wins: 28
- Nominations: 35

This is a list of awards and nominations received by Antonis Remos.

== Arion Music Awards ==
Remos received 12 awards from 19 nominations.

Year	Recipient	Award	Result
2002	Ela Na Me Teliossis	Song of the Year	Nominated
2002	Mia Nihta Mono	Best Modern Laïko Album	Won
2002	Mia Nihta Mono	Best Laïko Singer	Nominated
2002	Mia Nihta Mono	Album of the Year	Nominated
2002	Mia Nihta Mono	Best Laïko Album	Nominated
2002	Himself	Singer of the Year	Nominated
2003	Ekripsa To Prosopo Mou	Song of the Year	Nominated
2003	Kardia Mou Min Anisiheis	Best Laïko Singer	Nominated
2003	Kardia Mou Min Anisiheis	Best Laïko Album	Nominated
2003	Kardia Mou Min Anisiheis	Best Modern Laïko Singer	Won
2003	Kardia Mou Min Anisiheis	Best Modern Laïko Album	Won
2003	Kardia Mou Min Anisiheis	Singer of the Year	Won
2003	Kardia Mou Min Anisiheis	Album of the Year	Won
2004	Mia Anapnoi	Best Modern Laïko Singer	Won
2004	Mia Anapnoi	Best Laïko Album	Won
2004	Pia Nomizis Pos Ise	Best Laïko Song	Nominated
2004	Mia Anapnoi	Best Modern Laïko Album	Won
2004	Mia Anapnoi	Best Laïko Singer	Won
2004	Ego Eimai Edo	Best Modern Laïko Song	Nominated
2004	Mia Anapnoi	Singer of the Year	Nominated
2004	Mia Anapnoi	Album of the Year	Nominated
2005	Live	Live Album of the Year	Won
2005	Live	Best Laïko Singer	Won
2005	Live	Singer of the Year	Nominated
2006	San Anemos	Best Laïko Album	Nominated
2006	San Anemos	Best Laïko Song	Nominated
2006	San Anemos	Best Laïko Singer	Nominated
2006	San Anemos	Singer of the Year	Won
2006	San Anemos	Album of the Year	Nominated
2007	Signomi	Best Laïko Song	Nominated
2007	Live (Marinella & Antonis Remos Album)	Singer of the Year	Nominated

== Cyprus Music Awards ==
Year	Recipient	Award	Result
2006	Tha 'Prepe	Best Romantic Song from Love Radio Cyprus	Won
2006	San Anemos	Best Greek Album	Won
2006	Himself	Best Singer	Won
2007	Signomi	Best Romantic Song from Love Radio Cyprus	Won
2007	Signomi	Best Greek Single	Nominated
2007	Himself	Best Singer	Nominated

== MAD Video Music Awards ==
Year	Recipient	Award	Result
2004	Mia Anapnoi	Best Modern Laïko Video Clip	Nominated
2004	Mia Anapnoi	Best Video Clip for Male Artist	Won
2004	Himself	Artist of the Year with the Most Played Video Clip	Nominated
2005	Hamogelase	Best Pop Video Clip	Nominated
2005	Hamogelase	Best Video Clip for Male Artist	Won
2006	San Anemos	Best Video Clip for Male Artist	Nominated
2006	San Anemos	Best Modern Laïko Video Clip	Nominated
2007	Signomi	Best Modern Laïko Video Clip	Nominated
2007	Signomi	Best Video Clip for Male Artist	Nominated
2009	Pote	Best Modern Laïko Video Clip	Nominated
2009	Exo Esena	Best Male Artist	Nominated
2011	Kommena Pia Ta Daneika	Best Lyrics/Catchphrases	Won
2011	Himself	Best Male Artist	Nominated
2011	Kommena Pia Ta Daneika	MAD Greekz Video Clip	Nominated
2013	Ta Savvata	Best Laïko Video Clip	Won
2013	Himself	Artist of the year	Won
2014	Mporei Na Vgo (feat. Manos Pirovolakis)	Video Clip of the Year	Nominated
2014	Mporei Na Vgo (feat. Manos Pirovolakis)	Best Duet/Collaborations	Nominated
2014	Mporei Na Vgo (feat. Manos Pirovolakis)	MAD Greekz Video Clip	Nominated
2014	Mporei Na Vgo (feat. Manos Pirovolakis)	Song of the Year	Nominated
2014	Himself	Artist of the Year	Nominated
2015	Ginete	Best MAD Greekz Video	Nominated
2015	Himself	Best Adult Male	Nominated
2015	Ginete	Best Video of the Year	Nominated

== Pop Corn Music Awards ==
Year	Recipient	Award	Result
1997	Himself	Best New Artist	Won
1997	Emeis (w/ Mando)	Best Duet	Nominated
1998	Himself	Best Singer	Won
1999	Etsi Ksafnika	Best Male Stage Presence	Won
2000	Himself	Best Male Stage Presence	Nominated
2000	Himself	Best Singer	Won
2001	Mine	Best Male Performance	Nominated
2001	Himself	Best Male Stage Presence	Nominated
2001	Pali Ap'Tin Arhi	Best Album	Nominated
2001	I Agapi Ine Elefantas (w/ Tania Nasibian)	Best Duet	Nominated
2001	Mine	Best Song	Nominated
2001	Fly With Me	Best Dance Song	Nominated
2001	Himself	Best Singer	Nominated

== Status Man of the Year Awards ==
Year	Award	Result
2003	Singer of the Year	Won
2004	Singer of the Year	Won
2007	Singer of the Year	Won
