= Pop Corn Music Awards 1999 =

Pop Corn Music Awards of 1999
- Awarded for: Votes by readers of Greek music publication Pop Corn and viewers of Mega Channel
- Date: 2000
- Location: Athens
- Country: Greece
- Hosted by: Eleni Menegaki
- Most awards: Sakis Rouvas (5)
- Most nominations: Katy Garbi (7), Natasa Theodoridou (7)

Television/radio coverage
- Network: Mega Channel

The ninth Annual Pop Corn Music Awards for 1999, in Athens, Greece. The awards recognized the most popular artists and albums in Greece from the year 1999 as voted by Greek music publication Pop Corn. The event was hosted by Eleni Menegaki in 2001. The Pop Corn Music Awards were discontinued in 2002.

== Performances ==
Artist(s)	Song(s)
Antonis Remos	"Meine" "Mi Zitas Signomi" "Dikopo Fili" "Ta Megala Mas Ta Lathi"
One	"Den Mporo Horis Esena" "Proti Mou Fora"
Natasa Theodoridou	"Enteka Para" "Na Grapseis Lathos"
Sakis Rouvas	"Anteksa" "I Kardia Mou Htypa" "Theleis I Den Theleis" "Se Thelo San Trelos"
Themis Adamadidis	"Pou Na Pao"
Christos Antoniadis	"To Sinaisthima Mou"

== Winners and nominees ==
Best Video Clip	Best Breakthrough Artist
Giorgos Lanthimos – "Den Ehei Sidera I Kardia" (Sakis Rouvas); Giorgos Gavalos – "Sirmatoplegma" ([Giorgos Alkaios); Dimitris Sotas – "Oute Ena Efharisto" (Despina Vandi); Babis Makridis – "Ena Keno" (Giorgos Mazonakis); Dimitris Sotas – "Ti Zoi Mou Kaio" (Christos Dantis)	Giorgos Lembesis; Exis; Christos Pazis; Thodoris Panas; One
Best Laiko Dance Song	Best Group
Natasa Theodoridou – "Pou Perpatas"; Themis Adamadidis – "Ma Pou Na Pao"; Katy Garbi – "Agkires"; Angela Dimitriou – "Kane Stin Akri"; Nikos Kourkoulis – "Mera Me Tin Mera"	One; Anemos; Exis; Goin' Through; Imiskoumbria
Best Entehno Song	Most Played Track
Giannis Kotsiras – "I Proti Mas Fora"; Giannis Vardis – "Den To Pistevo"; Dimitris Basis – "Tora Meno Monos Mou"; Eleni Peta – "Auto Pou Ksero"; Marina Skiadaresi – "Astoria"	Lambis Livieratos – "To Koritsi Tou Filou Mou"
Album of the Year	Song of the Year
Notis Sfakianakis – XXX Enthimion; Katy Garbi – Doro Theou; Natasa Theodoridou – Defteri Agapi; Sakis Rouvas – Kati Apo Mena	Sakis Rouvas – "Den Ehei Sidera I Kardia Sou"; Giorgos Alkaios – "Sirmatoplegma"; Despina Vandi – "Spania"; Christos Dantis – "Kommatia"; Triantafillos – "I Agapi Sou Me Paei"
Best Male Vocals	Best Female Vocals
Sakis Rouvas – "Den Ehei Sidera I Kardia Sou"; Christos Dantis – "To Palio Mou Palto"; Thanos Kalliris – "Geia Sou Kai Mi Me Ksehnas"; Dimitris Kokotas – "Eisai Ginaika Ouranos"; Giorgos Mazonakis – "Ena Keno"	Despina Vandi – "Oute Ena Efharisto"; Katy Garbi – "Pos Fovamai Na Sou Po"; Evridiki – "Afta Pou Krivo Mesa Mou"; Natasa Theodoridou – "Enteka Para"; Eleni Peta – "Afta Pou Ksero"
Best Male Performance	Best Female Performance
Sakis Rouvas; Giorgos Alkaios; Christos Dantis; Lambis Livieratos; Antonis Remos	Despina Vandi; Anna Vissi; Katy Garbi; Evridiki; Natasa Theodoridou
Best Composition	Best Duet/Collaboration
Giorgos Theofanous – "Den Ehei Sidera I Kardia Mou" (Sakis Rouvas); Antonis Vardis – "Pou Na Eksigo" (A. Vardis & G. Vardis); Manos Xydous & Panagiotis Spiropoulos – "Iparhoun Hrisopsara Edo;" (Mihalis Hatzigiannis); Lakis Papadopoulos – "To Palio Mou Palto" (Christos Dantis); Giorgos Hatzopoulos – "Tou Erota Kai Tis Fotias" (Anemos)	Pashalis Terzis & Natasa Theodoridou – "Den Thelo Tetious Filous"; Antonis Vardis & Giannis Vardis – "Pou Na Eksigo"; Giorgos Lembesis & Despina Vandi – "Kataliles Proipothesis"; Gion' Through & Giorgos Mazonakis – "Thelo Na Giriso Sta Palia"; Stelios Rokkos & Sakis Rouvas – "Oso Eho Esena"
Best Lyric	Best Artwork
Manos Xydous – "Iparhoun Hrisopsara Edo;" (Mihalis Hatzigiannis); Gioula Georgiou – "Doro Theou" (Katy Garbi); Eleni Zioga – "Tou Erota Kai Tis Fotias" (Anemos); Giorgos Theofanous – "Den Ehei Sidera I Kardia Sou" (Sakis Rouvas); Sanny Baltzi – "To Palio Mou Palto" (Christos Dantis)	Ioanna & Natasa Aggelaki – Doro Theou (Katy Garbi); Petros Petrashis – Allaksane Ta Plana Mou (Giorgos Mazonakis); Maria Pitsokou – To Koumbi (Evridiki); Maria Pitsokou – Kati Apo Mena (Sakis Rouvas); Dimitris Rekouniotis – To Kalitero Paidi (Lambis Livieratos)
Male Artist of the Year	Female Artist of the Year
Antonis Remos; Christos Dantis; Giorgos Mazonakis; Sakis Rouvas; Notis Sfakianakis	Anna Vissi; Despina Vandi; Katy Garbi; Evridiki; Natasa Theodoridou
International
Best Group	Backstreet Boys
Best Male Artist	Ricky Martin
Best Female Artist	Celine Dion
Best Single	Lou Bega - "Mambo No. 5"
Best Album	Ricky Martin - "Ricky Martin"
Best Dance Pop Video Clip	Five - "Keep On Movin'"
Best Alternative Video Clip	Powerman 5000 - "When Worlds Collide"
Best Video Clip	Madonna - "Beautiful Stranger"
Achievement Award
Christos Nikolopoulos
Song of the Decade
Anna Vissi - "Den Thelo Na Ksereis"
