= Pop Corn Music Awards 1998 =

- Awarded for: Votes by readers of Greek music publication Pop Corn and viewers of Mega Channel
- Date: 1999
- Location: Athens
- Country: Greece
- Hosted by: Andreas Mikroutsikos

Television/radio coverage
- Network: ANT1

The eighth Annual Pop Corn Music Awards were held in 1998 in Athens, Greece. The awards recognized the most popular artists and albums in Greece from the year 1998 as voted by Greek music publication Pop Corn. The awards were hosted by Andreas Mikroutsikos in the March 1999. The Pop Corn Music Awards were discontinued in 2002.

== Performances ==
Artist(s)	Song(s)
Natasa Theodoridou	"Pou Perpatas"
Sakis Rouvas	"I Kardia Mou Htipa" "Theleis I Den Theleis" "Den Ehei Sidera I Kardia Sou"

== Winners and nominees ==
Best Video Clip	Best Breakthrough Artist
Giorgos Lanthimos – "Theleis I Den Theleis" (Sakis Rouvas); Giorgos Gavalos – "Ena Hrono To Perisotero" (Nikos Karvelas & Anna Vissi); Vaggelis Kalaitzis – "Pios Einai Aftos" (Lambis Livieratos); Kostas Kapetanidis – "Simadi Sto Lemo" (Evridiki); Dimitris Sotas – "Etsi Ksafnika" (Antonis Remos)	Natasa Theodoridou
Best Laiko Dance Song	Best Group
Unavailable	Imiskoumbria; Active Member; Goin' Through; Kaka Koritsia; Terror X Crew
Album of the Year	Song of the Year
Katy Garbi – Evaisthisies	Katy Garbi - "Evaisthisies"
Best Male Interpretation	Best Female Interpretation
Antonis Remos – "Etsi Ksafnika"; Giorgos Alkaios – "Sighorese Me"; Giannis Vardis – "Eilikrina"; Notis Sfakianakis – "Thelo Na Se Ksanado"; Dionysis Shoinas – "Den Tha Se Afiso Pote Mou (Logia)"	Anna Vissi – "Gazi"; Despina Vandi – "Thelo Na Se Ksehaso"; Katy Garbi – "Apozimiosi"; Evridiki – "Dese Mou Ta Matia"; Mando – "Ti Mou Heis Kanei"
Best Male Performance	Best Female Performance
Sakis Rouvas	Anna Vissi; Despina Vandi; Katy Garbi; Evridiki; Natasa Theodoridou
Best Composition	Best Duet/Collaboration
Unavailable	Valandis & Evridiki – "Den Teleiosame"
Best Lyric	Best Artwork
Unavailable	Unavailable
Male Artist of the Year	Female Artist of the Year
Unavailable	Anna Vissi; Despina Vandi; Katy Garbi; Evridiki; Mando
Radio Sfera 102.1 Song of the Year
Katy Garbi - "Evaisthisies"
