= Pop Corn Music Awards 1997 =

- Awarded for: Votes by readers of Greek music publication Pop Corn and viewers of Mega Channel
- Date: 31 March, 1998
- Location: Theatre REX (Athens)
- Country: Greece
- Hosted by: Vana Barba and Apostolos Gletsos
- Most awards: Anna Vissi (7)

Television/radio coverage
- Network: Mega Channel

The seventh Annual Pop Corn Music Awards for 1997, at Theatre REX, Athens, Greece. The awards recognized the most popular artists and albums in Greece from the year 1997 as voted by Greek music publication Pop Corn. The event was hosted by Vana Barba and Apostolos Gletsos on March 31, 1998. The Pop Corn Music Awards were discontinued in 2002.

== Performances ==
Artist(s)	Song(s)
Katy Garbi	"Apozimiosi"
Sakis Rouvas	"Otan O Kosmos Tha Allaksei (Panagia Ton Parision)"
Five	"Slam Dunk The Funk" "When The Lights Go Out"
Anna Vissi	"Gazi" "S'Eho Epithimisi"

== Winners and nominees ==
Best Video Clip	Best Breakthrough Artist
Giorgos Gavalos – "O Faros" (Mando); Diitris Sotas – "Deka Magisses" (Giannis Savvidakis); Vaggelis Kalaitzsis – "To Louketo" (Giorgos Mazonakis)	Triantafillos; Antonis Christos; Valantis; Lena Papadopoulou; Nektarios Sfirakis
Best Laiko Dance Song	Best Group
Dimitris Kokotas – "Porselani"; Anna Vissi & Sakis Rouvas – "Se Thelo, Me Thelis"; Angela Dimitriou – "Margarites"	Imiskoumbria; Zig Zag; Goin' Through; Kaka Koritsia; Mple
Album of the Year	Song of the Year
Anna Vissi – Travma; Antonis Vardis & Giannis Vardis – Ikogenniaki Ipothesi; Thanos Kalliris – Fonakse Me; Dimitris Kokotas – Aharistia; Lambis Livieratos – Bam Kai Kato	Giannis Savvidakis – "Deka Magisses"; Anna Vissi – "Travma"; Stelios Rokkos– "Megales Agapes"
Best Male Interpretation	Best Female Interpretation
Giannis Vardis – "Isos"; Thanos Kalliris – "Ponao"; Dimitris Kokotas – "Ilie Mou"	Anna Vissi – "Mavra Gialia"; Anna Vissi – "Ekei"; Evridiki – "Perasmena Masanihtis"; Mando – "Oles Tis Fores"; Antzy Samiou – "Mi Fevgeis"
Best Duet/Collaboration	Best Stage Performance
Antonis Vardis & Giannis Vardis – "Ikogenneiaki Ipothesi"; Imiskoumbria & Elpida – "Sti Discotheque"; Paschalis Terzis & Stella Konitopoulou – "Inopnevmataki"	Anna Vissi; Lambis Livieratos; Sakis Rouvas; Dionysis Schinas
Best Composition	Most Likeable Artist
Nikos_Karvelas – "Mavra Gialia" (Anna Vissi); Antonis Vardis – "Isos" (G. Vardis); Phoebus – "Ilie Mou" (Dimitris Kokotas); Phoebus – "Danika" (Mando); Theodoris Lahanas – "Deka Magisses" (Giannis Savvidakis)	Giorgos Alkaios; Dionysis Schinas; Antonis Remos
Best Lyric	Best Artwork
Manos Tsilimidis – "Ikogenneiaki Ipothesi" ([Antonis Vardis); Natalia Germanou – "Apolito Keno" (Anna Vissi); Giannis Kalpouzos – "Deka Magisses" (Giannis Savvidakis)	Antonis Glykos – Travma (Anna Vissi); Petros Parashis – Akrovatis Tou Onirou (Giannis Savvidakis); Alkistis Spilioti – Pes To Mou Afto (Evridiki)
Male Artist of the Year	Female Artist of the Year
Antonis Remos; Giorgos Alkaios; Thanos Kalliris	Anna Vissi; Despina Vandi; Katy Garbi; Evridiki; Mando
International
Best Group	Spice Girls
Best New Artist	Hanson
Best Male Artist	Peter Andre
Best Female Artist	Celine Dion
Best Single	Aqua - "Barbie Girl"
Best Album	Spice Girls - "Spiceworld"
Best Dance Act	The Prodigy
Best Dance Single	Backstreet Boys - "Everybody (Backstreet's Back)"
Best Video Clip	Backstreet Boys - "Everybody (Backstreet's Back)"
Achievement Award
Mimis Plessas
Radio Top 10 Award
Antonis Remos - "Ti Eimouna Gia Sena"
Sfera 102.1 Song of The Year
Anna Vissi - "Travma"
