= I Want You Now =

I Want You Now may refer to:

- "I Want You Now" by Depeche Mode from the 1987 album Music for the Masses
- "I Want You Now" by Liza Minnelli from the 1989 album Results
- "I Want You Now" by Antonis Remos from the 2003 album Mia Anapnoi
- "I Want You Now" by Big Sugar from the 2003 album Hit & Run
- "I Want You Now" by Ultra from the 2006 album The Sun Shines Brighter
- "I Want You Now" by the Sorry Kisses from the 2008 album Hard Drive
- "I Want You Now" by the Feeling from the 2008 album Twelve Stops and Home
