= List of awards and nominations received by Spice Girls =

Spice Girls awards and nominations
Awards and nominations
Award	Wins	Nominations
American Music Awards	3	3
Billboard	4	7
Brit	5	9
Echo	1	1
Ivor Novello	2	3
Juno	1	2
MTV Europe	3	7
MTV VMA	1	2
World Music	3	3

Totals (Note: Certain award groups do not simply award one winner. They acknowledge several different recipients, have runners-up, and have third place. Since this is a specific recognition and is different from losing an award, runner-up mentions are considered wins in this award tally. For simplification and to avoid errors, each award in this list has been presumed to have had a prior nomination.)
- Wins: 100
- Nominations: 149

The Spice Girls are an English girl group formed in 1994. The group comprises Victoria Beckham ("Posh Spice"), Melanie Brown/Mel B ("Scary Spice"), Emma Bunton ("Baby Spice"), Melanie Chisholm/Mel C ("Sporty Spice") and Geri Halliwell ("Ginger Spice").

The Spice Girls were signed to Virgin Records and released their debut single "Wannabe" in 1996; it hit #1 in 37 countries and charted in the Top 10 of several other territories, and commenced their global success. Their debut album Spice was released in 1996 as well, and sold more than 23 million copies worldwide. The four singles released from the album all peaked at #1 in the UK, and within the Top 5/Top 10 of many other countries. Their second album, Spiceworld, was released in the fall of 1997 and was also a commercial success, selling over 14 million copies worldwide. The album and its lead single, "Spice Up Your Life", peaked at #1 in the UK, as did two other singles from the album, "Too Much" and "Viva Forever". The fourth single from the album, "Stop!", peaked at #2 in the UK. The group released their third and final studio album Forever in November 2000, which was also their first and only album without Halliwell, who left for personal reasons in May of 1998. The lead single from the album, "Goodbye", went to #1 in the UK, and was their third consecutive "Christmas #1". After a hiatus of seven years, the group reunited in 2007 for a concert tour and released a greatest hits album.

Over their careers, the Spice Girls have received a number of notable awards including five Brit Awards, three American Music Awards, four Billboard Music Awards, three MTV Europe Music Awards, one MTV Video Music Award and three World Music Awards. The British Academy of Songwriters, Composers and Authors (BASCA) have also recognised the group for their songwriting achievements with two Ivor Novello Awards, while the American Society of Composers, Authors and Publishers (ASCAP) named them Songwriters of the Year at the 1997 ASCAP London Awards. In 2000, they received the Brit Award for Outstanding Contribution to Music, a Lifetime Achievement award whose previous winners include Elton John, the Beatles and Queen.

== Awards and nominations ==
List of awards and nominations received by the Spice Girls
Award	Year (Note: Indicates the year of ceremony. Each year is linked to the article about the awards held that year, wherever possible.)	Recipient(s) and nominee(s)	Category	Result	Ref.
American Music Awards	1998	Spice	Favorite Pop/Rock Album	Won	
American Music Awards	1998	Spice Girls	Favorite Pop/Rock New Artist	Won	
American Music Awards	1998	Spice Girls	Favorite Pop/Rock Band/Duo/Group	Won	
ASCAP London Music Awards	1998	Spice Girls	Songwriters of the Year	Won	
ASCAP London Music Awards	1998	"2 Become 1"	Song of the Year	Won	
ASCAP London Music Awards	1998	"2 Become 1"	Most Performed Songs	Won	
ASCAP London Music Awards	1998	"Say You'll Be There"	Most Performed Songs	Won	
ASCAP London Music Awards	1998	"Wannabe"	Most Performed Songs	Won	
ASCAP London Music Awards	1999	"2 Become 1"	Most Performed Songs	Won	
ASCAP London Music Awards	1999	"Too Much"	Most Performed Songs	Won	
ASCAP Pop Music Awards	1998	"Wannabe"	Most Performed Songs	Won	
ASCAP Pop Music Awards	1998	"Say You'll Be There"	Most Performed Songs	Won	
Bambi Award	1997	Spice Girls	Female Shooting Star	Won	
Billboard Live Music Awards	2008	The Return of the Spice Girls Tour	Top Boxscore	Won	
Billboard Live Music Awards	2019	Spice World – 2019 Tour	Top Boxscore	Won	
Billboard Music Awards	1997	Spice	Album of the Year	Won	
Billboard Music Awards	1997	Spice Girls	New Artist of the Year	Won	
Billboard Music Awards	1997	Spice Girls	Hot 100 Singles Group of the Year	Won	
Billboard Music Awards	1997	Spice Girls	Album Group of the Year	Won	
Billboard Music Awards	1997	Spice Girls	Artist of the Year	Nominated	
Billboard Music Awards	1997	Spice Girls	Hot 100 Singles Artist of the Year	Nominated	
Billboard Music Awards	1998	Spiceworld	Soundtrack Album of the Year	Nominated	
Billboard Music Video Awards	1997	"Say You'll Be There"	Fan.tastic Video	Won	
Billboard Music Video Awards	1997	"Say You'll Be There"	Best Pop/Rock New Artist Clip	Nominated	
Billboard Music Video Awards	1997	"Say You'll Be There"	Best Pop/Rock Clip	Nominated	
Blockbuster Entertainment Awards	1998	Spice	Favorite CD	Nominated	
Blockbuster Entertainment Awards	1998	Spice Girls	Favorite Group – Pop	Won	
Blockbuster Entertainment Awards	1998	Spice Girls	Favorite Group – New Artist	Nominated	
Blockbuster Entertainment Awards	1999	Spice Girls	Favorite Movie Actress in a Comedy	Nominated	
Bravo Awards	1997	Spice Girls	Bravo Otto Gold Award	Won	
Bravo Awards	1998	Spice Girls	Bravo Otto Gold Award	Won	
Brit Awards	1997	Spice Girls	Best British Group	Nominated	
Brit Awards	1997	Spice Girls	Best British Newcomer	Nominated	
Brit Awards	1997	"Say You'll Be There"	Best British Video	Won	
Brit Awards	1997	"Wannabe"	Best British Video	Nominated	
Brit Awards	1997	"Wannabe"	Best British Single	Won	
Brit Awards	1998	Spice Girls	Best Selling British Album Act	Won	
Brit Awards	1998	"Spice Up Your Life"	Best British Video	Nominated	
Brit Awards	2000	Spice Girls	Outstanding Contribution To Music	Won	
Brit Awards	2010	Spice Girls (1997 performance of "Wannabe"/"Who Do You Think You Are")	Brits Performance of 30 Years	Won	
Capital FM Awards	1997	Spice Girls	London's Favourite Female Group	Won	
Capital FM Awards	1997	Spice Girls	Special Help a London Child Award	Won	
Capital FM Awards	1999	Spiceworld Tour	London's Favourite Concert	Won	
Capital FM Awards	2001	Spice Girls	London's Favourite Group	Nominated	
Capital FM Awards	2008	Spice Girls	Icon Award	Won	
Channel V Music Awards	1997	Spice	Best International Album	Won	
Channel V Music Awards	1997	"Wannabe"	Best International Song	Won	
Comet Awards	1997	"Wannabe"	Best International Video	Won	
Danish Grammy Awards	1997	Spice Girls	Best Foreign New Act	Nominated	
Disney Channel Awards	1998	Spice Girls	Best Pop Stars	Won	
Echo Music Prize	1996	Spice Girls	Best International Newcomer	Won	
Edison Award	1998	"Spice Up Your Life"	Best International Video	Won	
FolhaTeen Poll Awards	2000	Spice Girls	Best Band	Won	
FolhaTeen Poll Awards	2000	Forever	Best Album	Won	
FolhaTeen Poll Awards	2000	"Holler"	Best Song	Won	
FolhaTeen Poll Awards	2000	"Holler"	Best Video	Won	
Glamour Awards	2008	Spice Girls	Women of the Year – Band	Won	
Goldene Europa	1996	Spice Girls	International Pop Group	Won	
Guinness World Records	1998	Spice Girls	Highest annual earnings ever for a girl band	Won	
Guinness World Records	1998	Spice Girls (tied with the Beatles)	Most consecutive Christmas No. 1s – UK singles chart	Won	
IRMA Awards	1997	Spice	Best International Pop Album	Won	
Ivor Novello Awards	1997	"Wannabe"	Best Selling British Written Single in the UK	Won	
Ivor Novello Awards	1997	"Wannabe"	International Hit of the Year	Won	
Ivor Novello Awards	1998	"Spice Up Your Life"	International Hit of the Year	Nominated	
Japan Gold Disc Award	1997	Spice Girls	Top New Foreign Artist	Won	
Juno Award	1998	Spice	Best Selling Album (Foreign or Domestic)	Won	
Juno Award	1999	Spiceworld	Best Selling Album (Foreign or Domestic)	Nominated	
Mercury Prize	1997	Spice	Best Album	Shortlisted	
MTV Europe Music Awards	1996	"Wannabe"	MTV Select	Nominated	
MTV Europe Music Awards	1997	Spice Girls	Best Dance Act	Nominated	
MTV Europe Music Awards	1997	Spice Girls	Best Break-Through Act	Nominated	
MTV Europe Music Awards	1997	Spice Girls	Best Group	Won	
MTV Europe Music Awards	1997	"Spice Up Your Life"	MTV Select	Nominated	
MTV Europe Music Awards	1998	Spice Girls	Best Group	Won	
MTV Europe Music Awards	1998	Spice Girls	Best Pop Act	Won	
MTV Video Music Awards	1997	"Wannabe"	Best Dance Video	Won	
MTV Video Music Awards	1997	"Say You'll Be There"	Viewer's Choice	Nominated	
MuchMusic Video Awards	1998	Spice Girls	Favorite International Group	Nominated	
MuchMusic Video Awards	1998	"Spice Up Your Life"	Favorite International Group Video	Nominated	
Multishow Brazilian Music Awards	1997	Spice Girls	International New Artist	Won	
Music Television Awards	1997	Spice Girls	Best Breakthroug	Won	
Music Television Awards	1997	Spice Girls	Best Pop Act	Won	
Music Television Awards	1997	Spice Girls	Best Group	Nominated	
Music Television Awards	1998	Spice Girls	Best Group	Won	
Music Television Awards	1998	Spice Girls	Best Pop Act	Nominated	
Music Television Awards	1998	Spiceworld	Best Album	Nominated	
My VH1 Music Awards	2000	Spice Girls	Best U.K. Act	Nominated	
NARM Annual Trade Awards	1998	Spice	Best Seller Award – Recording of the Year	Won	
NARM Annual Trade Awards	1998	Spice	Best Seller Award – Chartmaker	Won	
Nickelodeon Kids' Choice Awards	1998	Spice Girls	Favorite Music Group	Nominated	
Nickelodeon Kids' Choice Awards	1999	Spice Girls	Favorite Music Group	Nominated	
Nickelodeon Kids' Choice Awards	1999	Spice Girls	Favorite Movie Actress	Nominated	
Now 100 Awards	2018	"Wannabe"	Best Song of the Now Years – 90's	Nominated	
Now 100 Awards	2018	Spice Girls	Best Now Group	Nominated	
Online Music Awards	1997	Spice	Album of the Year	Won	
Pop Corn Music Awards	1997	Spice Girls	Best International Group	Won	
Pop Corn Music Awards	1997	Spiceworld	Best International Album	Won	
Porin	1998	Spiceworld	Best Foreign Pop/Rock Album	Nominated	
Premios Amigo	1997	Spice Girls	International Revelation	Won	
Premios Ondas	1997	Spice Girls	Special Mention of the Jury	Won	
Red Nose Awards	1997	"Wannabe"	Best Single	Won	
Rockbjornen Music Awards	1997	Spice Girls	Best Foreign Group	Nominated	
Smash Hits Poll Winners Party	1996	"Say You'll Be There"	Best Pop Video	Won	
Smash Hits Poll Winners Party	1996	"Say You'll Be There"	Best Single	Nominated	
Smash Hits Poll Winners Party	1996	"Wannabe"	Best Pop Video	Nominated	
Smash Hits Poll Winners Party	1996	"Wannabe"	Best Single	Nominated	
Smash Hits Poll Winners Party	1996	Spice	Best Album	Nominated	
Smash Hits Poll Winners Party	1996	Spice Girls	Best Soul Act	Nominated	
Smash Hits Poll Winners Party	1996	Spice Girls	Best New Act	Won	
Smash Hits Poll Winners Party	1996	Spice Girls	Best British Group	Won	
Smash Hits Poll Winners Party	1997	Spice Girls	Best British Group	Won	
Smash Hits Poll Winners Party	1997	Spice Girls	Worst British Group	Won	
Smash Hits Poll Winners Party	1997	"Spice Up Your Life"	Worst Single	Won	
Smash Hits Poll Winners Party	1997	Spice	Best Album	Nominated	
Smash Hits Poll Winners Party	1997	"Spice Up Your Life"	Best Single	Nominated	
Smash Hits Poll Winners Party	1997	"Spice Up Your Life"	Best Pop Video	Nominated	
Smash Hits Poll Winners Party	1997	"Who Do You Think You Are"	Best Pop Video	Nominated	
Smash Hits Poll Winners Party	1998	Spice Girls	Best British Group	Nominated	
Smash Hits Poll Winners Party	1998	Spice Girls	Best Band on Planet Pop	Nominated	
Smash Hits Poll Winners Party	1999	Spice Girls	Worst Group	Won	
The Sun's Bizarre Awards	1996	Spice Girls	Best Group	Won	
The Sun's Bizarre Awards	1996	Spice Girls	Best New Artist	Won	
The Sun's Bizarre Awards	1996	"Wannabe"	Best Single	Won	
The Sun's Bizarre Awards	2007	Spice Girls	Best Comeback	Won	
TMF Awards	1997	Spice Girls	Best International Group	Won	
TMF Awards	1998	Spice Girls	Best International Group	Won	
Tokio Hot 100 Awards	1997	Spice Girls	Best Character	Won	
Variety Club Awards	1997	Spice Girls	Best Recording Artist	Won	
Vodafone Live Music Awards	2008	The Return of the Spice Girls Tour	Best Live Comeback	Won	
World Music Awards	1997	Spice Girls	World's Best-Selling Female Newcomers	Won	
World Music Awards	1998	Spice Girls	World's Best-Selling Pop Artist/Group	Won	
World Music Awards	1998	Spice Girls	World's Best-Selling British Artist/Group	Won	
Z100 New York Radio Awards	2000	Spice Girls	Best Female Group	Nominated	
Z100 New York Radio Awards	2000	Spice Girls	Best Comeback Artist	Nominated	
3AM Daily Mirror Awards	2007	Spice Girls	Best Comeback	Won	

== Listicles ==
Name of publisher, name of listicle, year(s) listed, and placement result
Publisher	Listicle	Year(s)	Result	Ref.
Advertising Age	Top Marketing 100	1997	Placed	
Billboard	The Greatest Pop Star by Year (1981–2019)	1997	Rookie of the Year	
British Council	The best-known Britons	2000	2nd	
Forbes	Celebrity 100	1999	6th	
The Independent	50 Women Who Broke Barriers in the Music Industry	2020	Placed	
Q	Biggest Bands in the World	1998	1st	
Rolling Stone	The Millennial 100 (for their "girl power" ethos)	2018	Placed	
VH1	VH1's 100 Greatest Women in Music	2012	81st	
