= Chryso Stamatopoulou =

Greek singer

Chryso Stamatopoulou Χρυσώ Σταματοπούλου
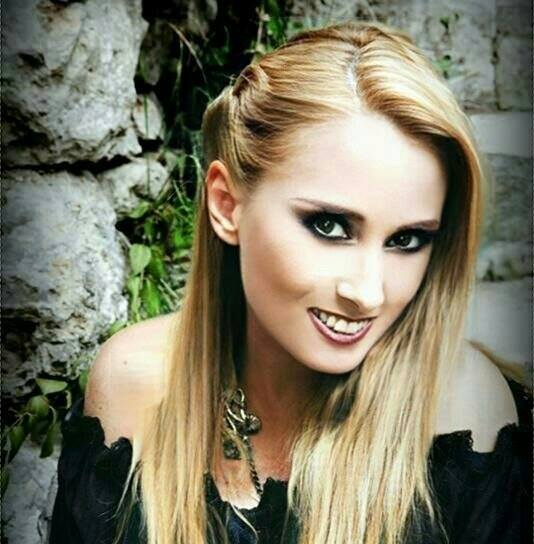
- Chryso in 2018

Background information
- Born: 22 March 1975 (age 51); Athens, Greece
- Genres: Rock, heavy metal
- Occupation: Singer
- Years active: 1995– present
- Member of: Chrysilia
- Website: www.chrysostamatopoulou.com

Chryso Stamatopoulou (in Greek: Χρυσώ Σταματοπούλου; born 22 March 1975) is a Greek rock singer. She is the lead singer of romantic folk metal band Chrysilia. She is mostly known for her two greek rock studio albums (San Anemos 2001 and Akatorthoto 2012), her participation in the popular prime time live music show Amstel live on Greek National TV for three seasons, but came to international success with heavy metal band Chrysilia in 2017. The band has rave reviews internationally, especially for Chryso's voice and composing skills.

She is the sister of Greek pop diva Mando (in Greek Μαντώ). She won the second position in UNICEF's "Danny Kaye Awards" at the age of 13 and she has participated twice in the Eurovision Song Contest as a backing vocalist, with her sister Mando in 2003 and with Belarus in 2005. In 2002–2003, she also performed on stage as "Taptim", taking the lead from fellow singer/actress Evridiki, in the musical The King and I, produced by actress/director Mimi Denisi. Her third album was released on 12 October 2017 with Chrysilia in symphonic rock/romantic heavy metal style. Being an accomplished Contemporary Vocals Professor, she is teaching in three Music Schools in Athens, including one of the largest music schools in the world, Modern Music School. In 2014–2015, she performed in the Greek version of The Sound of Music, the most expensive musical theatre production in Greece.

In the beginning of 2016, Chryso formed the romantic folk metal band Chrysilia, together with co-composer and keyboardist Elias Pero (Sovereign), multi-instrumentalist and producer Bob Katsionis (Firewind, Serious Black, Outloud), guitarist Teo Ross, bassist Jim Ramses, violin virtuoso Odysseas Zafeiropoulos and drummer Panos Geo. Their first full album, produced by Bob Katsionis, was released on 12 October 2017 by neoclassical Finnish rock label Lion Music.

In November 2016, Chryso was invited as a vocal coach at The Voice of Greece on Greek TV channel Skai but she declined due to her focus on Chrysilia and her vocal teaching career.

On 21 and 22 September 2018, Chryso performed at the Herodes Atticus Odeon, one of the world's most historic and prestigious theatres, together with the Prague Philharmonic Orchestra and the Athens State Orchestra in symphonic renditions of classic rock anthems by Deep Purple, Led Zeppelin, Queen, Europe and more. Both shows in the 5,000 capacity ancient theatre were sold out.

She is currently teaching vocals and performs occasionally.

== Discography ==
- San Anemos (Like the wind) (M Records, 2000)
- Akatorthoto (Unachievable) (Warner Music, 2012)
- Et in Arcadia ego (Lion Music, 2017)
