= Kleista Ta Stomata =

Kleista Ta Stomata Κλειστά Τα Στόματα

Studio album by Antonis Remos
- Released: March 2011
- Recorded: 2010–2011
- Genre: Modern Laika, pop
- Label: Heaven Music Greece

Antonis Remos chronology
Alithies & Psemata (2008)	Kleista Ta Stomata; Κλειστά Τα Στόματα (2011)	I Kardia Me Pigenei Emena (2013)

Singles from Kleista Ta Stomata
- 1. "Kommena Pia Ta Danika" Released: November, 2010; 2. "Ine Stigmes" Released: December 2010; 3. "Kleista Ta Stomata" Released: March 2011; 4. "I Nichta Dio Kommatia" Released: May 2011; 5. "Feggaria Hartina" Released: August 2011; 6. "Tora Epizo" Released: November 2011; 7. "Parelthon" Released: January 2012

Kleista Ta Stomata (Greek: Κλειστά Τα Στόματα; English: Zipped Mouths) is the title of the 8th studio album by Greek Modern Laika singer Antonis Remos. The 11-track album was released in March 2011 by Heaven Music Grevr and is his first studio album of entirely new material since 2008.

== Promotion ==
- For the promotion of the album, a CD-maxi was released on Christmas 2010 (3 months before the official release of the album), featuring the first two singles of the album "Kommena Pia Ta Danika" and "Ine Stigmes". The CD-maxi was titled "2 Songs".
- Remos also appeared on MAD Video Music Awards performing "Kleista Ta Stomata".
- Although seven radio singles were released on radios, only three official videos were made for the album, for the singles "Kommena Pia Ta Danika", "Ine Stigmes" and "Kleista Ta Stomata". For the third video clip footage from Remos appearance of MAD Video Music Awards 2011 was used.

== Track listing ==
1. Two pieces of the Night—I Nyhta Dyo Kommatia (Η νύχτα δυο κομμάτια)
2. Loans are over now—Kommena pia ta daneika
3. Paper moons—Feggaria hartina (Φεγγάρια χάρτινα)
4. I didn't manage—Den katafera (Δεν κατάφερα)
5. Now I survive—Tora epizo (Τώρα επιζώ)
6. There Are Moments—Einai Stigmes (Είναι Στιγμές)
7. Dare to leave—Kane na fugeis
8. To leave—Να Φύγεις
9. Zipped mouths—Kleista Ta Stomata (Κλειστά τα στόματα)
10. Past—Parelthon (Παρελθόν)
11. When you're here—Otan eisai edw (Όταν Είσαι Εδώ)
12. Happy birthday—Xronia Polla (Χρόνια Πολλά)

== Singles ==
- Kommena Pia Ta Danika

This was the first single and video off the album.

- Ine Stigmes

The second single and video off the album.

- Kleista Ta Stomata

The third single off the album. For a video, Remos' appearance of MAD Video Music Awards 2011 was used.

- I Nichta Dio Kommatia

The fourth radio single. No video was made.

- Feggaria Hartina

Fifth single from the album. Again no video was made for the song.

- Tora Epizo

The dance track was promoted as the sixth single off the album. No video was filmed to promote the song.

- Parelthon

By popular demand, 'Parelthon' was made the seventh radio-single off the album on the beginning of 2012.

== Commercial Success ==
Initially the album was released with the TV magazine Tiletheatis and sold 60,000 copies, a great success for the magazine. The following week the album was released on music stores, and there the album sold more than 36,000 copies with in a year, making it one of the best sellers of 2011 on the record shops. Based on those sales, the album was certified 3× Platinum in Greece.
