= Kardia Mou Min Anisiheis =

Kardia Mou Min Anisiheis Καρδιά Μου Μην Ανησυχείς

Studio album by Antonis Remos
- Released: 23 April 2002
- Recorded: November 2001 – March 2002
- Genre: Pop, modern laika
- Length: 1:04:49
- Language: Greek
- Label: Sony Music
- Producer: Stavros Arapidis

Antonis Remos chronology
Pali Ap'Tin Arhi (1999)	Kardia Mou Min Anisiheis; Καρδιά Μου Μην Ανησυχείς (2002)	Mia Anapnoi (2003)

Singles from Kardia Mou Min Anisiheis
- 1. "Ela Na Me Teleioseis" Released: November 2001; 2. "Den Eho Pou Na Pao" Released: February 2002; 3. "Kardia Mou Min Anisiheis" Released: April 2002; 4. "Ekripsa To Prosopo Mou" Released: June 2002; 5. "Tremo" Released: August 2002; 6. "Savvatovrada" Released: October 2002; 7. "De Teleiosame" Released: December 2002; 8. "Ti Sou 'Ho Kanei" Released: February 2003; 9. "Mi Me Rotaei Kaneis" Released: April 2003

Kardia Mou Min Anisiheis (Greek: Καρδιά Μου Μην Ανησυχείς; English: Don't Worry My Heart) is the fifth studio album by Greek famous singer, Antonis Remos. It was released on 23 April 2002 by Epic and Sony Music and certified four times platinum in Greece, selling over 160,000 units, and double platinum in Cyprus, selling over 12,000 units. This was the best selling album of the year and for Remos's discography. It was his first collaboration with Giorgos Theofanous who was written and produced whole the album. In December 2001, Remos was released a CD single with two new tracks: "Ela Na Me Teliosis" and "Den Eho Pou Na Pao", which became double platinum. The album was re-released in May 2003, featuring remixes and the duet with Alkistis Protopsalti "S' Agapo".

== Tracklist ==
All tracks are written by Giorgos Theofanous.

No.	Title	Length
1.	"Kardia Mou Min Anisiheis" (Καρδιά Μου Μην Ανησυχείς; Don't Worry My Heart)	3:53
2.	"Pes Mou Ti Zitas" (Πες Μου Τι Ζητάς; Tell Me What Are You Asking For)	3:43
3.	"Ekripsa To Prosopo Mou" (Έκρυψα Το Πρόσωπο Μου; I Hid My Face)	5:08
4.	"Den Eho Pou Na Pao" (Δεν Έχω Που Να Πάω; I Have Nowhere To Go)	4:56
5.	"Tremo" (Τρέμω; I'm Trembling)	4:51
6.	"Ela Na Me Teleioseis" (Έλα Να Με Τελειώσεις; Come To Get Me Over)	4:50
7.	"Ti Sou 'Ho Kanei" (Τι Σου 'Χω Κάνει; What Have I Done To You)	3:43
8.	"Paradehomai" (Παραδέχομαι; I Admit)	3:32
9.	"De Teleiosame" (Δε Τελειώσαμε; We're Not Done)	4:30
10.	"S' Agapo... Einai Aplo" (Σ' Αγαπώ... Είναι Απλό; I Love You... It's Simple)	4:39
11.	"Savvatovrada" (Σαββατόβραδα; Saturday Nights)	4:07
12.	"Mi Me Rotaei Kaneis" (Μη Με Ρωτάει Κανείς; Don't Anyone Ask Me)	4:16
13.	"Arrostimeno Mou Mialo" (Αρρωστημένο Μου Μυαλό; My Sick Mind)	4:42
14.	"Meta Ap' Ola Afta" (Μετά Απ' Όλα Αυτά; After All These)	4:27
15.	"S' Ekdikithika" (Σ' Εκδικήθηκα; I Took My Revenge)	4:32
Total length:		1:04:49

Re-released Edition bonus tracks

1. Den teleiosame (Remixes by Remee)
2. Kardia mou min anisiheis (Galleon Radio mix)
3. S' Agapo (Alkistis Protopsalti featuring Antonis Remos)

== Singles ==
1. "Ela Na Me Teleioseis"
2. "Den Eho Pou Na Pao"
3. "Kardia Mou Min Anisiheis"
4. "Ekripsa To Prosopo Mou"
5. "Tremo"
6. "Savvatovrada"
7. "De Teleiosame"
8. "Ti Sou 'Ho Kanei"
9. "Mi Me Rotaei Kaneis"
10. "S' Agapo"
- "S' Agapo" was the second single of Protopsalti's album Pes Mou Thalassa, released in December 2002, and was included in the re-release of Kardia Mou Min Anisihis in May 2003.

== Credits ==
Credits adapted from liner notes.

=== Personnel ===
- Stavros Arapidis – guitars (all except 10)
- Maria Bilntea – harp (14)
- Hakan Bingolou – säz (2, 8)
- Yiannis Bithikotsis – bouzouki, baglama (3, 6, 7, 11, 14) • cura (3, 7, 9, 11, 13)
- Konstantinos Christoforou – backing vocals (1, 2, 3, 5, 6, 10, 12, 13)
- Kyriakos Gkouventas – violin, viola (14, 15)
- Vaggelis Karipis – percussion (1, 2, 8, 10, 13)
- Lefki Kolovou – cello (4)
- Katerina Kyriakou – backing vocals (1, 2, 3, 5, 6, 10, 12, 13)
- Fay Matsou – second vocal (7)
- Andreas Mouzakis – drums (all except 2 & 5)
- Alex Panayi – backing vocals (1, 2, 3, 5, 6, 10, 12, 13)
- Elena Patroklou – backing vocals (1, 2, 3, 5, 6, 10, 12, 13)
- Nikos Politis – harmonica, contrabass (11, 14)
- Greta Sinay – viola (4)
- Giorgos Theofanous – orchestration, programming, keyboards
- Stella Tsani – violin (4)
- Philippos Tseberoulis – alto saxophone (5)
- Nikos Vardis – bass (all except 5)
- Thanasis Vasilopoulos – clarinet, ney (10, 12, 13)

=== Production ===
- Stavros Arapidis – executive producer
- Sotiris Egkolfopoulos (Workshop studio) – engineer's assistant
- Dimitris Horianopoulos (Workshop studio) – engineer, editing
- Yiannis Ioannidis (Digital Press Hellas) – mastering
- Elias Lakkas (Odeon studio) – engineer, mix
- Niovi Panagiotakou (Odeon studio) – engineer's assistant
- Sotiris Papadopoulos (Stendor studio) – extra recordings
- Petros Siakavellas (Digital Press Hellas) – mastering
- Akis Ziakas (Odeon studio) – editing

=== Artwork ===
- Al Giga – styling
- Yiannis Mihailidis – grooming
- Dimitris Rekouniotis – art direction
- Katerina Tsatsani – photographer

== Charts ==
Kardia Mou Min Anisihis made its debut at number 1 on the 'Top 50 Greek Albums' charts by IFPI.

It was certified four time platinum and stayed on charts for 70 weeks.

Chart	Providers	Peak position	Certification
Greek Albums Chart	IFPI	1	4×Platinum
Cypriot Album Chart	Musical Paradise Top 10	1	2×Platinum
