= Chrysilia =

Greek symphonic metal band

- Origin: Athens, Greece
- Genres: Symphonic metal; folk metal; female-fronted metal
- Years active: 2016–present
- Label: Lion Music
- Members: Chryso; Sergio Tellis; John Skalkotos; Nick Teteris
- Website: chrysilia.com

Chrysilia is a symphonic metal band formed in Athens, Greece, in 2016.

== History ==
The band was founded by musical actress and rock performer Chryso and composer/keyboardist Elias Pero (Sovereign), but eventually Chrysilia evolved to a band with a full debut album.

In the initial stages of the project, producer and multi-instrumentalist Bob Katsionis (Firewind, Outloud) played a major role in the formation of the band. He arranged and produced most of the album, together with Elias Pero, Jim Loop and John Skalkotos, and he also composed one of the album’s songs, "The Fifth Season", which is based on his solo work.

The debut album "Et in Arcadia ego" was released by Finland's Lion Music in October 2017. It is a concept album inspired by Arcadia (utopia) as it is depicted in the Renaissance. The album, having worldwide distribution, has been received with excellent reviews internationally, having been compared quality-wise to the likes of Avantasia, Ayreon, Eluveitie and Nightwish. It is regarded as one of 2017's best metal albums, based on the cinematic complexity behind apparently catchy tunes and characterized by Chryso's voice, that has been compared to the genre's best. In the album, Chrysilia paid their tributes to one of Greece's extreme metal flagships, Rotting Christ, covering a black metal track in an alternative, folk/symphonic way.

After the album’s live release event with progsters SL Theory, Chrysilia were invited to play live in prime shows in Greece and Europe, including Voices of the Mist in Athens and the FemME festival in Eindhoven, NL. Chrysilia's live shows have been praised as being dynamic, dramatic and professional. Chrysilia have chosen to visualize most of their songs, having five official video clips to date.

On December 6, 2018, Chrysilia was confirmed as a special guest for the Athens show of British rock legends Uriah Heep.

The band's line-up currently consists of Chryso, Sergio Tellis, John Skalkotos and Nick Teteris.

On December 12, 2019, the second full album was announced for a 2020 release, under the production of Devon Graves (Psychotic Waltz).

The first single “Dragunera: Act II” was released on November 20, 2020, accompanied by an official video.

== Discography ==
- Et in Arcadia ego (Lion Music, 2017)
- Dragunera: Act II (Lion Music, 2020)
