= I Megaliteres Epitihies (Mando album) =

Compilation album by Mando
- Released: March 2003
- Genre: Pop, dance, modern laika
- Label: Sony Music Greece/Columbia

Mando chronology
Se Alli Diastasi (2000)	I Megaliteres Epitihies (2003)	Oi Agapes Fevgoun, Ta Tragoudia Menoun (2003)

I Megaliteres Epityhies is a compilation album by the Greek singer Mando which was released in Greece in March 2003. It contains Mando's greatest hits from the albums that she released under the label of Sony Music Greece.

== Track listing ==
=== Disc 1 ===
1. "Se Kseperasa"
2. "Ligo Ligo"
3. "Emis" (in duet with Antonis Remos)
4. "Fos" (in duet with Sertab)
5. "S'Efharisto"
6. "Tha S'Agapo"
7. "Ine I Agapi Amartia"
8. "Pio Poly"
9. "I Zoi" (C'Est La Vie)
10. "Fotia Sta Prepi"
11. "Fthinoporines Psihales"
12. "Ola Ta Rologia"
13. "Ti Mou'His Kani"
14. "Prodosia"

=== Disc 2 ===
1. "Me Miso Feggari"
2. "Ftes Esy" (Cancao Do Mar)
3. "Matea"
4. "Teleftea Fora" (Devami Var)
5. "Dyo S'Agapo"
6. "Faros"
7. "Danika"
8. "Gia Oles Tis Fores"
9. "Don Kihotis"
10. "Agapi Ble"
11. "Gyalina Feggaria" (All Through The Night)
12. "Stis Alykes Tou Kosmou"
13. "Apili"
14. "Ston Evdomo Ourano"
