= Alithies & Psemata =

Alithies & Psemata Αλήθειες & Ψέματα

Studio album by Antonis Remos
- Released: 18 November 2008
- Recorded: 2008
- Genres: Modern Laika, pop
- Length: 58:09
- Label: Sony BMG Greece/Epic

Antonis Remos chronology
Marinella & Antonis Remos – Live (2007)	Alithies & Psemata; Αλήθειες & Ψέματα (2008)	Kleista Ta Stomata (2011)

Singles from Alithies & Psemata
- 1. "Pote" Released: 14 October 2008; 2. "Ekaton Fore" Released: December 2008; 3. "Eho Esena" Released: February 2009

Alithies & Psemata (Greek: Αλήθειες & Ψέματα; English: Truths & Lies) is the title of the 7th studio album by Greek Modern Laika singer Antonis Remos. The 15-track album was released on November 18, 2008 by Sony BMG Greece and is his first studio album of entirely new material since 2005.

== Background ==
The original release date had been set for 13 November but the album's release was delayed until the 18th. The album represents Remos' collaboration with numerous established Laika and Greek pop songwriters, as well as other songwriters. Prominent singer-songwriter Antonis Vardis is the chief music composer of the album with seven tracks and with lyrics by Vasilis Giannopoulos, including the first single "Pote". Stefanos Korkolis has composed the music along with lyrics by Nikos Moraïtis to two songs. "Den Iparhi Meta" is a cover with Greek lyrics of the French song "Une Femme A Qui L'On Ment" sung by Chimène Badi. Other music composers include: Christos Dantis, Apostolis Valaroutsos, Harry Varthakouris, Kostas Baltazanis, and Kiriakos Papadopoulos; other lyricists include: Nikos Gritsis, Mirto Kontova, Antonis Andrikakis, Kiriakos Papadopoulos, Apostolis Valaroutsos, Harry Varthakouris, and Nikos Sarris. Remos spent a long time in studio sifting through many songs to choose for his upcoming studio release. Sfera radio station was the main sponsor of the album.

== Promotion ==
To promote the album, Remos began appearances at the Athinon Arena on 14 November 2008, where he performed many of the songs on the album throughout the winter season. Supporting acts included Athina Routsi and group Emigre.

== Track listing ==
1. "Pote" (Never) – 4:07
2. "Ekato Fores Kommatia" (A hundred times in pieces) – 4:00
3. "Eho Esena" (I have you) – 3:42
4. "Den Iparhi Meta (Une femme a qui l'on ment)" (Afterwards does not exist) – 3:14
5. "Ti Nomizes" (What did you think) – 3:43
6. "To Paradehome" (I admit it) – 3:34
7. "Sti Ftotia" (In fire) – 3:39
8. "Kathe Fora Pou Se Thimame" (Each time that I remember you) –3:55
9. "Dio Psemata" (Two lies) – 4:14
10. "Eimai Akoma Edo" (I am still here) – 4:10
11. "Epitelous" (Finally) – 3:31
12. "Mehri To Telos Tou Kosmou" (Until the end of the world) – 3:51
13. "Se Perimeno" (I wait for you) – 4:11
14. "Prosopika" (Personally) – 4:04
15. "I Alitheia Einai" (The truth is) – 4:18

== Singles ==
"Pote"

"Pote" was released a month prior, on 14 October 2008, as the lead single. Remos appeared on the season premiere of MAD's music talk show OK! with Themis Georgantas, where he debuted the song and its music video. There was a multicast between MAD TV and Sfera radio station where hostess and lyricist Natalia Germanou simultaneously participated in the interview. The music video is directed by Alexandros Grammatopoulos.

"Ekato Fores Kommatia"

"Ekato Fores Kommatia" was the second single. The music video was directed by Giorgos Gavalos. The darkly lit setting showcased Remos recording in the studio sitting in front of a microphone and also positioned in various spots within the isolation booth.

"Eho Esena"

"Eho Esena" was the third single. The music video was directed by Kostas Kapetanidis and filmed at Athinon Arena music hall. Filming lasted for 22 hours and over 200 people were in attendance as part of the music hall's audience, including members of Remos's official fan club. Twenty foreign dancers were chosen for the choreography, and there were appearances from some notable foreign models. A poodle was also dyed pink especially for the clip. The video premiered on MAD's website, and made its television debut the same day on MAD's show OK! with Themis Georgantas.

== Chart performance ==
Alithies & Psemata debuted at number one on the IFPI charts for week 48, and was certified Gold the same week. By its second week, it had dipped to number three, and number twenty-nine by week seven. As of the week 16/2009 charts, the album had charted for 13 weeks.

The album placed at number ten on IFPI's Year-end chart for Top 50 Greek albums of 2008, and number eleven on the Top 50 Greek and International albums of 2008.

In March 2009 IFPI Greece announced that they would close their charts for a period of time in order to renew their charting system, thus it is not possible to track the chart and sales records of "Alithies & Psemata". On 17 July 2009 IFPI confirmed via email that the album reached Platinum status in Greece. IFPI Greece is set to resume public release of charts in the coming months.

Chart	Providers	Peak position	Weeks On Charts	Certification
Greek Albums Chart	IFPI	1	13	Platinum
Top 50 Greek Albums of 2008	IFPI	10	-	-
Top 50 Greek and International Albums of 2008	IFPI	11	-	-
