= Mando & Coltrane Big Band =

Single by Mando
- Released: November 2001
- Genre: Jazz
- Label: Europe Records

Mando singles chronology
"Mando & Coltrane Big Band" (2001)	"Ligo Ligo" (2002)

"Mando & Coltrane Big Band" is a single by the Greek popular singer Mando, released in Europe in November 2001 through Europe Records. After releasing a couple of successful albums in Greece, Mando surprised everyone at the end of 2001, by doing something she had wanted for a long time but which seemed impossible in the Greek music industry. With the help of her friend, musician Costas Liakis, she released this single with five tracks of older jazz and music songs. This act annoyed her record company, but the single did unexpectedly well in sales without any promotion.

== Track listing ==
1. "You're Nobody Till somebody Loves You"
2. "Over The Rainbow"
3. "Solitude"
4. "Singin' In The Rain"
5. "Fever"
