= I Diki Mas I Agapi =

Studio album by Mando
- Released: 1993
- Genre: Pop, dance
- Label: Minos EMI

Mando chronology
Esthisis (1992)	I Diki Mas I Agapi (1993)	Anisiho Vlemma (1994)

I Diki Mas I Agapi is an album by the Greek singer Mando. It was released in Greece in 1993 by Minos EMI. The album followed Mando's trend of releasing one studio album per year.

== Track listing ==
1. "I Diki Mas I Agapi"
2. "S'agapo Gi'afto Pou Ise"
3. "Pote Min Xehnas"
4. "Lavirinthos"
5. "I Nihta Pefti"
6. "Filakise Me"
7. "Otan Tha Me Xanadis"
8. "Na Me Prosehis"
9. "De Me Niazi"
10. "Se Thelo"
11. "I Diki Mas I Agapi" (Acoustic Version)
