= Kinisi Triti =

Studio album by Mando
- Released: 1991
- Recorded: March–June 1991
- Studio: AI Sound Studios
- Genre: Pop, dance
- Label: Minos
- Producer: Philip Papatheodorou

Mando chronology
Ptisi Gia Dio (1990)	Kinisi Triti (1991)	Esthisis (1992)

Kinisi Triti is an album by the Greek singer Mando. It was released in Greece in 1991 by Minos. It is her third album and was released just a year after her previous effort.

== Track listing ==
- All lyrics by Evi Droutsa. Music by Alexis Papadimitriou.
1. "To Telio Zevgari"
2. "Timorise Me"
3. "Ti Zoi Mou Orizo"
4. "Esy"
5. "Anamnisis"
6. "Apokliete"
7. "Monomahia"
8. "Ironia"
9. "Apopse Simvenoun Polla"
10. "Mazi Sou Horevo"
