= Ptisi Gia Dyo =

Ptisi Gia Dio

Studio album by Mando
- Released: 1990
- Label: Minos

Mando chronology
Dos Mou Ena Fili... Afto to Kalokairi (1989)	Ptisi Gia Dio (1990)	Kinisi Triti (1991)

Ptisi Gia Dio is the second studio album by Greek singer Mando. It was released in Greece in 1990 by Minos. The album was her first hit album to be released in the 1990s.

== Track listing ==
1. "Kane Ki Esi Mia Trela"
2. "Stihimatizo"
3. "Pos"
4. "Klemmeni Zoi"
5. "Stagona Ston Okeano"
6. "Soma Me Soma Fili Me Fili"
7. "Ena Kalokeri Erotas"
8. "I Koukla"
9. "Kratisou Kala"
10. "Kenouria Zoi"
11. "Agria Fraoula"
