= Se Alli Diastasi =

Studio album by Mando
- Released: September 2000
- Genre: Pop, dance, modern laika
- Label: Sony Music Greece/Columbia

Mando chronology
Prodosia (1998)	Se Alli Diastasi (2000)	Oi Megaliteres Epityhies (2003)

Se Alli Diastasi is an album by the Greek singer Mando. It was released in Greece in September 2000 by Sony Music Greece. The album is more pop than Mando's previous one, with many western type songs. Hits of the album include "Akoma Mia Fora", "S'Efharisto" and, the most successful one, "Pio Poly", with music by Mando and lyrics by Natalia Germanou. The album also includes "Fos" (Ask), a duet with Sertab which is one of Mando's most notable collaborations. Jean Michel Jarre gave his permission for the first time for a rendition of one of his songs, as he was impressed by Mando's vocal abilities when he listened to her demo tape. Mando's performance in "C’Est La Vie", first sung by Natasha Atlas, was liked so much that Jarre gave Mando not only his permission, but also his original arrangement of the song.

== Track listing ==
1. "I Zoi" (C'Est La Vie)
2. "Akoma Mia Fora"
3. "Pio Poly"
4. "An Ine I Agapi Amartia"
5. "E...Ke"
6. "Ola Arhizoun Xana"
7. "Tha S'Agapo" (Je Te Dis Oui)
8. "S'Efharisto"
9. "Fovame"
10. "Lathos Mou"
11. "Oute Zesti Oute Kryo"
12. "Kalimera Monaxia Mou"
13. "Fthinoporines Psihales"
14. "Gelastina"
15. "Fos (Ask)" (duet with Sertab)
