= Dos Mou Ena Fili... Afto to Kalokairi =

Studio album by Mando
- Released: 1989
- Studio: Sierra Studios
- Label: Minos
- Producers: Vagelis Giannopoulos, Costas Charitodiplomenos

Mando chronology
Dos Mou Ena Fili... Afto to Kalokairi (1989)	Ptisi Gia Dio (1990)

Dos Mou Ena Fili... Afto to Kalokairi is an album by the Greek singer Mando. It was released in Greece in 1989 by Minos and is her first official Greek release. Its songs enjoyed airplay on Greek radio, introducing Mando to the audience of mainstream music.

== Track listing ==
- All lyrics by Giorgos Mitsinkas and Costas Charitodiplomenos. Music by Costas Charitodiplomenos.
1. "Dos Mou Ena Fili".
2. "Afto To Kalokairi"
3. "Pes To Pali"
4. "Anisiho"
5. "Alli Mia Nihta"
6. "Agkalitses Ke Filakia"
7. "Tha Kano Oti M'aresi"
8. "De Fovame Tipota"
9. "Mesa Sti Nihta"
10. "Stin Prosefhi Mou"
11. "Ohi Ohi"
