= Prodosia =

Studio album by Mando
- Released: November 1998
- Genre: Pop, dance, modern laika
- Label: Sony Music / Columbia

Mando chronology
Gia Oles Tis Fores (1997)	Prodosia (1998)	Se Alli Diastasi (2000)

Prodosia is an album by the Greek singer Mando. It was released in Greece in November 1998 by Sony Music Greece. It is her 9th album.

== Track listing ==
1. "Prodosia"
2. "Ti Mou' Xeis Kanei"
3. "Erotas Dilitirio"
4. "Fotia Sta Prepi"
5. "Pyreto Fotia Ke Zali"
6. "Ola Ta Rologia"
7. "Simera"
8. "Nyhta Min Erhese"
9. "Matia Pagovouna"
10. "Agapi Se Vaftisa"
11. "Ela Feggari Mou"
12. "Vresta Me Sena"
13. "Fthinoporines Psihales"
14. "Pos Zis" (Allah Görür)
15. "Mia Nyxta Agrypnias"
- Track 15 appeared only in the first pressings of the album and was later removed.
