= Mando II =

Studio album by Mando
- Released: May 30, 2008
- Recorded: 2007–2008
- Genre: Pop rock
- Length: 46:02
- Language: Greek, English
- Label: Polymusic
- Producer: Victor Polidorou, DEEKAY

Mando chronology
Oi Agapes Fevgoun, Ta Tragoudia Menoun (2003)	Mando II (2008)

Singles from Mando II
- 1. "Dos Mou Logo Na Sotho" Released: May 10, 2008; 2. "Den Eisai Ekei" Released: October 30, 2008

Mando II (Greek: Μαντώ II) is the Greek singer Mando's twelfth studio album and comeback after a five-year absence from the Greek music scene. It was released on May 30, 2008, by Polymusic and was Mando's first release since 2003.

The writers are Pegasos and Vicky Gerotheodorou as well as many well known song composers, including Mando herself. The title of the album represents a new start, and a second chapter in her music career after taking time off to be with her family. Mando has stated that one of the driving factors for her to return to the studio sooner rather than later, was her children, who kept asking her when she would release an album. She also stated that now she sings for her children first.

The song "Breathe Again" was reported to have been submitted to Ellinikí Radiofonía Tileórasi as a candidate for the Greek representative at the Eurovision Song Contest 2008, but was not selected for the national final.

The official presentation of the album was on June 10, 2008, at Club Bocca in Voula, Greece.

It peaked at number ten in Greece and number eight in Cyprus, receiving a Gold certification in both countries.

== Track list ==
In addition to the following tracks, the album also contains the music video of "Dos Mou Logo Na Sotho".

1. "Dos Mou Logo Na Sotho" (Pegasos) – 3:37
2. "Stahti" (Mando/Kostas Anathiotis, Mando) – 3:49
3. "Limani Dihos Thalassa" (Pegasos) – 4:01
4. "Den Eisai Ekei" (Pegasos) – 3:51
5. "Breathe Again" (Mando, Lars Jensen, Martin Larson) – 3:55
6. "S'Akoloutho" (Victor Polidorou, Vicky Gerothodorou) – 3:42
7. "Pente to Proi" (Mando, Eleni Gianatsoulia) – 3:24
8. "Safe" (Mando, Lars Jensen, Martin Larson) – 4:12
9. "Ena" (Andreas Lambrou) – 3:44
10. "Me Sena Telos" (Mando, Eleni Gianatsoulia) – 3:54
11. "Tha Thela Monaha" (Antonis Velinopoulos) – 3:43
12. "Ston Aigokairo" (Mando/Kostas Anathiotis, Nikos Katsikas) – 4:17

== Singles ==
"Dos Mou Logo Na Sotho"

The first single from Mando II is "Dos Mou Logo Na Sotho" (Give me a reason to be saved), written by Pegasos and released on May 10, 2008. The music video of the song was premiered on Mega Star, a Greek music television program. Mando said in an interview with Mega Star that the song is what drove her to go back into the studio.

"Den Eisai Ekei"

The second single was "Den Eisai Ekei", which Mando confirmed on September 4, 2008, while being interviewed at TV100 radio station and Peiratikos 107.7 FM. Later, she confirmed the choice on her Facebook page. The music video for "Den Eisai Ekei" was released on October 30, 2008; Manolis Tzirakis was the director again.

== Personnel ==
- Vocals – Victoria Halkiti, Apostolos Psihramis, Christina Undhjem

=== Production ===
- Instrumentation: Kostas Anathiotis
- Producers: Victor Polidorou, DEEKAY
- Photography: [Iakovos Kalaitzakis]http://www.iakovos.net
- Art direction and design: Jackie Murphy, Jeri Heiden, Glen Nakasako
- Stylist: Vasilis Kolpothinos
- Hair stylist: Vasilis Bouloubasis

== Charts ==
Chart	Providers	Peak position	Weeks On Charts	Certification
Greek Albums Chart	IFPI	10	6	Gold
Cypriot Album Chart	All Records Top 20	8	7	Gold
