= Aisthiseis =

Studio album by Mando
- Released: 1992
- Studio: Polysound Studios
- Genre: Pop, dance
- Label: Minos EMI
- Producer: Minos Machas

Mando chronology
Kinisi Triti (1991)	Aisthiseis (1992)	I Diki Mas I Agapi (1993)

Aisthiseis is an album by the Greek singer Mando. It was released in Greece in 1992 by Minos EMI. "Aisthiseis" was nominated for an award by Pop Corn magazine and sustained the success that Mando had established with her previous albums.

== Track listing ==
1. "Aisthiseis"
2. "Rouho Daniko"
3. "Epikindines Apostoles"
4. "Ase Me"
5. "De S'afino"
6. "Rantevou"
7. "Hronia Mas Polla"
8. "To Vregmeno Hartomantilo"
9. "Teriazoume San Ganti"
10. "Xipna"
11. "Mesanihta"
