= I Mando Ston Evdomo Ourano =

Studio album by Mando
- Released: October 1995
- Genre: Pop, dance
- Label: Sony Music / Columbia

Mando chronology
Anisiho Vlemma (1994)	I Mando Ston Evdomo Ourano (1995)	Gia Oles Tis Fores (1997)

I Mando Ston Evdomo Ourano is an album by the Greek singer Mando. It was released in Greece in October 1995 by Sony Music Greece after her departure from Minos EMI. The album enjoyed commercial and critical success. It was nominated for several awards by the Greek music magazine, "Pop Corn."

== Track listing ==
1. "Ston Evdomo Ourano"
2. "Gyalina Feggaria" (All Through The Night)
3. "Apili"
4. "Agapi Ble"
5. "Don Kihotis"
6. "Min Argis"
7. "Kitazo To Roloi"
8. "Kata Vathos Pedia"
9. "To Palio Mas Tragoudi"
10. "Stis Alykes Tou Kosmou"
11. "Opou Ki An Ise"
12. "Ton Hrismon Ta Dora"
13. "Mesimeriase"
14. "Afenti Mou Notia"
15. "Kardia Mou Moni"
16. "Ola Ta Thavmata"
