= Gia Oles Tis Fores =

Gia Oles Tis Fores Για Όλες Τις Φορές

Studio album by Mando
- Released: 9 June 1997
- Recorded: Phase One studio
- Genre: Pop, Modern laika, Dance
- Length: 63:08
- Language: Greek
- Label: Sony Music Greece; Columbia
- Producer: Υiannis Doulamis

Mando chronology
I Mando Ston Evdomo Ourano (1995)	Gia Oles Tis Fores; Για Όλες Τις Φορές (1997)	Prodosia (1998)

Singles from Gia Oles Tis Fores
- 1. "Gia Oles Tis Fores" Released: 9 June 1997; 2. "Danika" Released: 14 July 1997; 3. "Faros" Released: 8 September 1997; 4. "Matea" Released: 13 October 1997

Gia Oles Tis Fores (Greek: For All The Times) is the eighth studio album by Greek singer Mando. It was released οn 9 June 1997 by Sony Music Greece in Greece and after three months certified gold, selling over 30,000 units. Supported by the single «Danika», the album went on to receive nominations by Pop Corn magazine awards. The album was written primarily by Phoebus who composed 9 new tracks, and various artists, including some of her big hits like «Gia Oles Tis Fores», «Faros» and «Matea».

== Track listing ==
No.	Title	Lyrics	Music	Length
1.	"Gia Oles Tis Fores" (Για Όλες Τις Φορές; For All The Times)	Phoebus	Phoebus	3:56
2.	"Danika" (Δανεικά; Borrowed)	Phoebus	Phoebus	4:04
3.	"Faros" (Φάρος; Lighthouse)	Phoebus	Phoebus	4:07
4.	"Ftais Esi (Cancao Do Mar)" (Φταις Εσύ; It's Your Fault)	Aris Davarakis	Frederico J. Brito; Ferrer Trindade	4:44
5.	"Timima (La Cita)" (Τίμημα; Price)	Eleni Giannatsoulia	Jean Alejandro	5:19
6.	"Teleftaia Fora (Demavi Var)" (Τελευταία Φορά; Last Time)	Eleni Giannatsoulia	Kayahan Acar	5:18
7.	"Ble" (Μπλε; Blue)	Phoebus	Phoebus	4:20
8.	"Matea" (Μάταια; In Vain)	Phoebus	Phoebus	4:04
9.	"Me Miso Feggari" (Με Μισό Φεγγάρι; With Half A Moon)	Vaggelis Konstantinidis	Phoebus	3:26
10.	"Erastes Ke Dolofoni" (Εραστές Και Δολοφόνοι; Lovers And Killers)	Vaggelis Konstantinidis	Phoebus	3:59
11.	"Ola Ki Ola" (Όλα Κι Όλα; Everything And Everything)	Phoebus	Phoebus	3:10
12.	"Gine" (Γίνε; Become)	Vaggelis Konstantinidis	Phoebus	3:36
13.	"Dio S' Agapo" (Δύο Σ' Αγαπώ; Two I Love You)	Iro Trigoni	Dimitris Panopoulos	3:56
14.	"Fevgo (Yemin Ettim)" (Φεύγω; I'm Leaving)	Eleni Giannatsoulia	Kayahan Acar	4:10
15.	"Pou Pas (Until I'm Satisfied)" (Που Πας; Where Are You Going)	Eleni Giannatsoulia	Chief 1 Remee	4:59
Total length:				1:03:08

== Singles ==
The following tracks becoming radio singles with music videos. The tracks «Ola Ki Ola», «Gine» and «Dio S' Agapo» despite not having been released as singles, managed to gain radio airplay.

- Gia Oles Tis Fores (directed by Yiannis Thomopoulos)
- Danika (directed by Yiannis Thomopoulos)
- Faros (directed by Giorgos Gkavalos)
- Matea (directed by Giorgos Lanthimos)

== Credits ==
Credits adapted from album's liner notes.

=== Personnel ===
- Katerina Adamantidou – backing vocals (5, 14, 15)
- Charis Andreadis – orchestration, keyboards (8, 12)
- Dimos Beke – backing vocals (1, 2, 7, 8, 9, 10)
- Dimitris Bellos – programming (8, 12)
- Hakan Bingolou – säz (8)
- Yiannis Bithikotsis – bouzouki (2, 11, 12), cura (6, 10, 14), baglama (2, 11), mandolin (3)
- Nikos Chatzopoulos – violin (15)
- Rania Dizikiriki – backing vocals (1, 2, 7, 8, 9, 10)
- Thanos Gkiouletzis – violin (8)
- Stelios Goulielmos – backing vocals (5, 14, 15)
- Antonis Gounaris – guitars (all except 8), cümbüş (6, 7)
- Vanessa Karageorgou – backing vocals (5, 14, 15)
- Elli Kokkinou – backing vocals (1, 2, 7, 8, 9, 10)
- Giorgos Kostoglou – bass (1, 2, 10, 12)
- Thodoris Lizos – second vocal (12)
- Andreas Mouzakis – drums (2, 11)
- Dimitris Panopoulos – orchestration, programming, keyboards (4, 5, 6, 13, 14, 15)
- Thymios Papadopoulos – saxophone (4)
- Pimis Petrou – backing vocals (5, 14, 15)
- Phoebus – orchestration, programming, keyboards (1, 2, 7, 9, 10, 11)
- Orestis Plakidis – orchestration, programming, keyboards (3)
- Giorgos Roilos – percussion (1, 4, 6, 7, 8, 9, 10, 12, 14)
- Sissy Stamatopoulou – backing vocals (5, 14, 15)
- Eva Tselidou – backing vocals (1, 2, 7, 8, 9, 10)
- Thanasis Vasilopoulos – clarinet (1, 4, 6), ney (6, 8)

Production

- Aggelos Charitos – make up
- Yiannis Doulamis – production manager
- Antonis Glikos – artwork
- Yiannis Ioannidis (Digital Press Hellas) – mastering
- Efi Lioli – styling
- Apostolos Michalis – cover processing
- Michalis Orfanos – cover print
- Tony Stone Images – background photo
- Stefanos Vasilakis – hair styling
- Manolis Vlahos (Phase One studio) – sound engineer, mixing
- Tasos Vrettos – photographer
