= Anisiho Vlemma =

Studio album by Mando
- Released: July 1994
- Genres: Pop, dance
- Label: Minos EMI

Mando chronology
I Diki Mas I Agapi (1993)	Anisiho Vlemma (1994)	I Mando Ston Evdomo Ourano (1995)

Anisiho Vlemma is an album by the Greek singer Mando, released in Greece in 1994 by Minos EMI. It contained hits like "Dyo Filia Nyhterina", "Aporo" and "Erimin", as well as the mid-tempo ballad "Theli Anemo I Agapi". For the first time in her career, Mando composed many of the songs on the album. The album also includes the duet "Adiorthoti Agapi" with singer Dimitris Mitropanos.

== Track listing ==
1. "Ta Kalokeria Pou Tha Zisoume"
2. "Aporo"
3. "Theli Anemo I Agapi"
4. "Dio Filia Nyhterina"
5. "Eho Gia Sena Mia Zoi"
6. "M'Agapouses"
7. "Anisiho Vlemma"
8. "Erimin"
9. "Ti Nihta Ginonte Ta Thavmata"
10. "Pote"
11. "Alli To Lene Horismo"
12. "Thee Mou Esy"
13. "Adiorthoti Agapi" (in duet with Dimitris Mitropanos)
