= Mando (singer) =

Mando Μαντώ
- Born: Adamantia Stamatopoulou; 13 April 1966 (age 60); Piraeus, Greece
- Genres: Rock, pop
- Occupations: Singer; songwriter
- Instrument: Vocals
- Works: Mando discography
- Years active: 1985–present
- Labels: Sony BMG; Alpha Records; EMI Minos

Adamantia Stamatopoulou (Greek: Αδαμαντία Σταματοπούλου; born 13 April 1966), known as Mando (Greek: Μαντώ), is a Greek singer and songwriter. She was born and raised in Piraeus by her jazz pianist father, Nikos Stamatopoulos and a classical soprano mother, Mary Apergi.

From a young age she began to develop her talent and interest in music, and was characterized as a "born musician". She represented Greece in the Eurovision Song Contest 2003 with the song "Never Let You Go". On 14 March 2010, Alpha TV ranked Mando the 23rd top-certified female artist in the nation's phonographic era (since 1960), totalling five gold records. In 2013, she participated in the first season of the Greek version of Your Face Sounds Familiar which was aired by ANT1, where she placed 4th in the overall competition. She was a special guest star in the semi-final of The Voice of Greece where she and one of the participants, Maria Elena Kiriakou, sang together Beyonce's Hit "Listen" and she has presented her new song Poliploka from her upcoming album.

== Early life ==
At the age of four, Mando could easily sing operatic arias, gospel and jazz music. Her parents, astonished by her musical capability, signed her up with the National Conservatory for piano and music theory lessons. Meanwhile, she took up vocal training and dance lessons.

Along with her school work, her music, and her English and French lessons, she performed in the musical "Jesus Christ Superstar", under the direction of Mimis Plessas and Dimitris Malavetas.

She has sung for various orchestras and as a member of various jazz groups and trios, working with music in all its textures: jazz, Greek, European, American, and Arabic.

== Personal life ==
Mando has two children, a boy and a girl. Her sister is Chryso Stamatopoulou, also a professional singer.

== Professional career ==
=== 1985–2002 ===
After the completion of her music studies, she signed her first record contract with CBS, which gave her the international hit "Fill me up" and offered her the chance of an international career at a very young age. Mando remained in America for five years, where she took up vocal training with Hal Sheaffer (vocal trainer of Barbra Streisand and Liza Minnelli) and interacted with many musicians, producers and people who helped her talent grow. Her diverse knowledge and international edge defined her as a Greek artist with an international voice. Vangelis Yannopoulos, an A&R manager with record company Minos EMI, heard of all these assets and signed Mando for her first album with the company that she stayed with for six successful albums: Dos mou ena fili... Afto to kalokeri" (Give me a kiss... This summer), "Ptisi gia dio" (Flight for two), "Kinisi triti" (Third move), "Esthisis" (Senses), "I diki mas I agapi" (Our love), and "Anisiho vlema" (Uneasy look).

She has released four albums under the Sony label: "Ston evdomo ourano" (On the seventh sky), "Gia oles tis fores" (For all the times), "Prodosia" (Betrayal), "Se alli Diastasi" (In another dimension). She also released three CD singles under this label. Mando's hits include "Danika" (Borrowed), "Faros" (Lighthouse), "Ston evdomo ourano" (On the seventh sky), "Esi" (You), "Fotia sta prepi" (Burn the have to's).

Her international tours have included cities such as Los Angeles, London, Paris, Toronto, Montreal, New York, and Chicago.

She has toured and collaborated with many established artists such as: Marinella, D. Mitropanos, Tolis Voskopoulos, Paschalis Terzis, C. Nikolopoulos, Dimitra Galani.

Mando has collaborated with the best songwriters in the Greek music business, such as Phoivos, A. Papadimitriou, K. Haritodiplomenos, N. Germanou, G. Theofanous, E. Giannatsoulia. Several of Mando's compositions have been sung by artists such as P. Terzis and K. Kouka.

Mando composes mainly on her guitar. She penned the track "Where You Are" for Jessica Simpson; it has been chosen as the theme song to 20th century Fox's film production titled "Here on Earth". It has sold more than one million copies.

An international collaboration is that with Jean Michel Jarre on one of his own tracks and sung by Mando in Greek with the title "Zoi" (Life); it will be included on her new album.

Another international collaboration is Mando's duet with Turkish top artist Sertab Erener, titled "Aşk/Fos" (Love/Light).

At the end of 2003, Mando recorded a new double album with Alpha records called Oi agapes fevgoun, ta tragoudia menoun (The loves are gone by, the songs remain).

=== 2003: Eurovision ===
Mando's first attempt to enter the Eurovision Song Contest was in 1989; she competed in the Greek national final where she was second, only one point behind Marianna. She took action against the Hellenic Broadcasting Corporation (ERT) because one of the jury members didn't vote. She won the ruling, but because it was too late to reverse the decision, Marianna went to Eurovision.

Mando represented Greece at the Eurovision Song Contest 2003 after winning the ERT national final with the song "Never Let You Go", placing 17th.

=== 2008: Mando II and Afraid of the Dark ===
Mando planned a comeback for 2008 with two new albums: one Greek and one English. The first single from the Greek album titled "Dos Mou Logo Na Sotho" (" Δως Μου Λόγο Να Σωθώ ") is a rock song and was released as a music video on 10 May 2008, premiering on "Megastar". The album, titled Mando II, was released on 30 May 2008 with twelve new tracks.

The English album, provisionally titled Afraid of the Dark, has evident American beats. Four songs from the album were released by means of her official Myspace, and the album was expected to be released sometime in 2009, but it was cancelled.

=== 2011–2013: Phoebus 20 years, Shamone and Your face Sounds Familiar ===
In September 2011, her album Perfection was released by Polymusic. Tha se Perimenw (I'll be waiting for you), Mia Signomi ti na kanei (Sorry is not Enough) and Theos pano sti gi (God in earth) are some of the more popular songs of this album.

On 24 September 2012, Mando participated in a special 20-year Anniversary concert dedicated to Phoebus. The concert took place at the Olympic Stadium in Athens, where the 2004 Summer Olympics were held. Mando sang her songs "Gia Oles Tis Fores" and "Daneika" along with "Emeis", a duet between her and Antonis Remos which are all songs written by Phoebus.

On 2 December, she appeared at Shamone, a night bar-club where she sang a lot of her songs and international songs such as Adele's Skyfall, Nina Simone's I Put a Spell on You and Madonna's Frozen. On 21 January 2013, she appeared at Half Note Jazz Club, where she sang a tribute to her singer and mentor Stevie Wonder.

During this season, she gave many interviews in several Greek late-night shows like Ola with Themos Anastasiadis and Vrady with Petros Kostopoulos, and on early-morning shows like Kalimera Ellada with Giorgos Papadakis and Fthistv with Thanasis Patras, which all aired on Ant1.

=== 2014–15 ===
She participated as a special guest star at the semi-final of The Voice of Greece where she sang her new song "Poliploka" from her upcoming album.

==== Performances on Your Face Sounds Familiar ====
Your Face Sounds Familiar performances and results
Week	Portraying	Song	Points	Result
Week 1	Barbra Streisand	"Woman in Love"	23	2nd place
Week 2	Chaka Khan	"Ain't Nobody"	11	8th place
Week 3	Nana Mouskouri	"Yarem Yarem"	11	8th place
Week 4: Laïko night	Vicky Moscholiou	"Den Ksero Poso S'agapo"	19	5th place
Week 5: Eurovision night	Mihai Trăistariu	"Tornerò"	15	6th place
Week 6	Anastacia	"Left Outside Alone"	15	6th place
Week 7	Tzeni Vanou	"Hilies Vradies"	19	4th place
Week 8	Stevie Wonder	"Part-Time Lover"	22	1st place
Week 9	Rihanna	"Where Have You Been"	10	8th place
Week 10	Luciano Pavarotti	"La donna è mobile"	19	3rd place
Week 11: Semi-final	Lara Fabian	"Je suis malade"	20	4th place
Week 12: Final	Whitney Houston	""I Wanna Dance with Somebody (Who Loves Me)"	Did not scored	
TOTAL			184	4th place

== Discography ==
Studio albums

- 1989: Dos Mou Ena Fili... Afto to Kalokairi (Give Me A Kiss... This Summer)
- 1990: Ptisi Gia Dio (Flight For Two)
- 1991: Kinisi Triti (The Third Move)
- 1992: Esthisis (Sensations)
- 1993: I Diki Mas I Agapi (Our Love)
- 1994: Anisiho Vlemma (Worried Stare)
- 1995: I Mando Ston Evdomo Ourano (Mando in the Seventh Heaven)
- 1997: Gia Oles Tis Fores (For All The Times)
- 1998: Prodosia (Betrayal)
- 2000: Se Alli Diastasi (In Another Dimension)
- 2003: Oi Megaliteres Epityhies (The Greatest Hits)
- 2003: Oi Agapes Fevgoun, Ta Tragoudia Menoun (Loves Go, Songs Stay)
- 2008: Mando II
- 2011: Perfection
- 2017: Bare Bones
- 2022: Vradines Diadromes

EPs

- 1986: "Fill Me Up" (With Your Love)
- 1986: "Set Yourself in Motion"
- 2001: "Mando & Coltrane Big Band"
- 2002: "Ligo Ligo"

CD singles

- 2003: "Never Let You Go"
