= Antonis Vardis =

Greek singer-songwriter (1948–2014)

- Αντώνης Βαρδής
- Born: Antonios Vardis; 7 August 1948; Moschato, Kingdom of Greece
- Died: 2 September 2014 (aged 66); Ygeia Hospital, Marousi, Greece
- Resting place: Paiania Cemetery
- Occupation: Singer-songwriter
- Years active: 1954–2014

Antonis Vardis (Greek: Αντώνης Βαρδής; 7 August 1948 – 2 September 2014) was a Greek singer-songwriter.

Antonis Vardis was born on 7 August 1948, in Moschato, a suburb of Athens. He established a 40-year career as a composer and singer, collaborating with well-known Greek singers: George Dalaras, Yiannis Parios, Vasilis Papakonstantinou, Haris Alexiou, Dimitra Galani, and Anna Vissi.

In 1997 he collaborated with Austrian musician Gert Steinbäcker (S.T.S.), when he sung parts of the song O xenos.

During the 1990s and 2000s he worked as a composer with popular singers such as Keti Garbi, Antonis Remos, Natassa Theodoridou, Giannis Ploutarhos and others.

== Death ==
In 2013, Vardis was diagnosed with cancer. He was transferred to Hanover, Germany, to undergo surgery, which was later described as successful. However, he died at Ygeia Hospital, on 2 September 2014, at age 66. He was survived by his wife and their two children.

== Personal discography ==
- 1978 - Οραματίζομαι
- 1986 - Συγκάτοικοι είμαστε όλοι στην τρέλα
- 1988 - Tragoudame mazi (Cooperation with Christina Maragozi)
- 1990 - Leuki isopalia
- 1993 - Koini gnomi
- 1995 - Stin Ellas tou 2000
- 1997 - Oikogeneiaki ypothesi
- 1999 - Xediplonontas tis skepseis mou
- 2000 - Ta kalytera mas hronia, einai tora
- 2002 - Hamogelase psyhi mou
- 2003 - Oti eho sto harizo
- 2010 - Stin akri tou oneirou

== Compilations ==
- Ston Megisto Vathmo (2001)
- Oi Filoi Mou Ke Ego (2005)
- Oti Agapisame (2006)
- Ta Onira Mas (2008)
