= Imiskoumbria =

Comedy hip hop group from Athens

- Origin: Athens, Greece
- Genres: Comedy hip hop, pop-rap, satirical hip hop
- Years active: 1996–2016, 2025–present
- Labels: Minos/EMI, Def Jam/Universal, FM Records, ImizBiz Entertainment
- Members: Dimitris Mentzelos; Mithridatis; Pritanis
- Website: https://www.facebook.com/ImizBiz

Imiskoumbria (Greek: Ημισκούμπρια), also known as Imiz, is a comedy hip hop group from Athens, Greece. The group's roster has been the same since its inception in 1996. Imiz members include rapper Dimitris Mentzelos (Greek: Δημήτρης Μεντζέλος, born 1968), Mithridatis (born Mithridatis Hatzihatzoglou; Greek: Μιθριδάτης Χατζηχατζόγλου, born 1975) and DJ Pritanis (born Kostas Kostakos; Greek: Κώστας Κωστάκος, born 1972). They are widely credited for the establishment of hip-hop within Greek music show business.

== Name ==
Ημισκούμπρια has been translated as semi-mackerels. Σκουμπρί is the Greek word for the fish mackerel (compare Scombridae) and is sometimes used in slang for elusive persons. The first element ημι- is analogous to the formal prefix "hemi-" (in contrast to the colloquial μισό "half"). Hence the name refers to half-elusive guys. The combination of these two elements is used mainly for comedic effect rather than being meaningful.

== Discography ==
=== Albums ===
- 30 Χρόνια Επιτυχίες (30 Khronia Epitikhies/30 Years of Hits) - 1996, FM Records, HMI-Rec
- Ο Δίσκος που Διαφημίζετε (O Dhiskos pu Dhiafimizete/The Record That you are Advertising) - 1997, FM Records, HMI-Rec
- Στενές Επαφές με Τρεις Τύπους (Stenes Epafes me Tris Tipus/Close Encounters with Three Guys) - 1998, FM Records, HMI-Rec
- 2030 - 1999, Def Jam/Universal, Imiz Biz
- Τη Λόλα Απ'τη Φωτιά Ποιός Θα τη Βγάλει; (Ti Lola ap'ti Fotia Pios Tha ti Vghali?/Who's Going to Get Lola Out of the Fire?) - 2001, Def Jam/Universal, Imiz Biz
- Γυναικολογίες (Yinekoloyies/Gynecologisms) - 2004, Minos/EMI, Imiz Biz
- Η Απλή Μέθοδος των Τριών (E Apli Methodhos ton Trion/The Simple Rule of Three) - 2006, Minos/EMI, Imiz Biz

=== Singles ===
- Η Τσόντα (The Porn Flick) - 1996, FM Records, HMI-Rec
- Η Μαγική Τσατσάρα (The Magic Comb)(feat. U.N.E.E.K.) - 1998, FM Records
- Νωρίς (Early) (feat. Loukianos Kilaidonis) - 1999
- Πάμε όλοι μαζί σε μια παραλία (Let's All Go To A Beach) - 2001, Def Jam/Universal, Imiz Biz
- Πώς Να Αντιμετωπίσετε Το Σεισμό (How To Deal With The Earthquake) - 2003
- Greek Lover - 2004, Minos/EMI, Imiz Biz
- Ήπια 15 (I Drank 15) - 2004, Minos/EMI, Imiz Biz
- Είναι Μόνο Εκλογές (They Are Just Elections) - 2004, Minos/EMI, Imiz Biz
- Πάφα Πούφα Το Τσιγάρο (Puff Puff The Cigarette) - 2007
- Τα Χριστούγεννα Σημαίνουν (Christmas Means) - 2007, Minos/EMI, Imiz Biz
- Πώς να σου το πω (How Should I Tell You) - 2010, Universal, Imiz Biz
- Μια ιθαγενή (A Native) (feat. Psi) - 2011, Imiz Biz
- Λε Χαμ (Le Ham) - 2016, Imiz Biz

== Solo albums ==
- Αιρετικά Ερωτικός (Heretical Erotic) (Mithridatis) - 2009, Legend, Imiz Biz
- Ο Ράπερ Της Χρονιάς (Rapper Of The Year) (Dimitris Mentzelos) - 2011, Legend, Imiz Biz/Cenobite Productions/396 Rainlab/Ihokratoria

== Solo singles ==
- Ποτέ (Never) (Mithridatis) - 2009, Legend, Imiz Biz
- Άγιε Βασίλη, Μην Ξηγιέσαι (Santa Claus Stop Trippin') (Mithridatis) - 2010, Imiz Biz
- L.A., L.A. (Dimitris Mentzelos feat. Don Freaka) - 2012, Skull Records, Imiz Biz, Skull Records
- Όσα Και Να Πω (Whatever I Say) (Dimitris Mentzelos feat. Disastah) - 2012, Imiz Biz
- Τρέχα, Μαδαφάκα, Τρέχα (Run, Motherfucker, Run) (Mithridatis) - 2012, Imiz Biz
- Κρίση, Πτήση, Στύση (Crisis, Flight, Erection) (Dimitris Mentzelos feat. Tiny Jackal & Killah-P) - 2012, Imiz Biz
- Το Λένε Μουσική (It's Called Music) (Dimitris Mentzelos feat. Dagobah System) - 2012
- Σαλόνικα (Salonica) (Dimitris Mentzelos feat. Dodekatos Pithikos) - 2012, Imiz Biz
- Ντου Γιου Λοβ Μι (Do You Love Me) (Mithridatis) - 2013, Imiz Biz
- Μόνο Εσύ (Only You) (Mithridatis VS Christiana) - 2013, Imiz Biz
- Rock Rap Heavy (Dimitris Mentzelos & Prejudice Reborn) - 2013, Imiz Biz
- Η Νύφη (The Bride) (Mithridatis & Trendy HooliGuns) - 2014, Imiz Biz
- Σπιτουλίνι Αραχτουλίνι (Resting At Home) (Mithridatis) - 2014, Imiz Biz
- Μόνο Κρέας (Meat Only) (TRIPA Crew & Pritanis) - 2015, Imiz Biz
- Έχω Πάρει Φωτιά (I'm On Fire) (Dimitris Mentzelos feat. Tasos Krokodeilos & Mavros Ilos) - 2015, Imiz Biz
- Γλυκιά Ολντ'Σκουλιά (Sweet Old School) (Mithridatis) - 2017, Amok Time Arts
- El Gato Loco (Dimitris Mentzelos feat. Markos Koumaris) - 2018
- Το Λάθος Άτομο (The Wrong Person) (Mithridatis) - 2018, Amok Time Arts
- Darth Mith (Mithridatis) - 2019, Amok Time Arts

== Other projects ==
=== Albums ===
- La Klikaria - La Klikaria - 2000, Def Jam/Universal, Imiz Biz

=== Singles ===
- La Klikaria - Κοίτα με (Look At Me) - 2000, Def Jam/Universal, Imiz Biz
- B-Sykes feat. Dimitris Mentzelos & El Zeraw - Greek Ladies - 2007, Imiz Biz
- Killah-P feat. Dimitris Mentzelos - Ρούμι Τεκίλα (Rum Tequila) - 2009
- VHS feat. Dimitris Mentzelos - Ποιον Αγαπάς (Who Do You Love) - 2012
- Etsi De feat. Dimitris Mentzelos - Ανομολόγητα (The Ones That Shouldn't Be Told) - 2013, Etsi De Productions
- Dimitris Mentzelos & Prejudice Reborn - Rock Rap Heavy - 2013, Imiz Biz
- La Klikaria - #GoogleDatShit - 2015, Imiz Biz
- Dimitris Mentzelos & Prejudice Reborn feat. Donald D - Scream Your Lungs Out - 2017, Hood Groove Management
- Dimitris Mentzelos & Prejudice Reborn - Frankenstein (Chapter 1-The Creator) - 2017

=== EPs ===
- Radicals - R.E.A.L. - 1993. FreeStyle Productions
- FreeStyle Productions - FreeStyle Collection - 1994. FreeStyle Productions
- Dimitris Mentzelos & Prejudice Reborn - Rock Rap Heavy - 2013. Imiz Biz Entertainment

== Compilations ==
=== 1998 ===
- Το Hip Hop Δεν Σταματά (Hip Hop Doesn't Ever Stop)

=== 2000 ===
- 2000 Millenium Edition

=== 2001 ===
- Ημίζ Forevah (Imiz Forevah)

=== 2005 ===
- Tha Def Jam Yearz

=== 2007 ===
- Decade 96-06:Das Beste
- 30 Χρόνια Επιτυχίες/Ο Δίσκος Που Διαφημίζετε (30 Years Of Hits/The LP That you are Advertising)
- Τα Σουξέ Του Δίσκου:The Best Of The Rest (The Hits Of The Disc:The Best Of The Rest)

=== 2008 ===
- Πορτραίτα (Portraits)

== Appearances ==
=== 1994 ===
- Το Hip Hop Δεν Σταματά (Hip Hop Doesn't Stop)

=== 1997 ===
- Η Πτώση (The Fall) (Goin' Through feat. Imiskoumbria & Terror X Crew)
- Παραμένουμε Μουρλοί (We Remain Crazy)
- Προφυλακτικών Εγκώμιον (CondomEncomium)
- Αμφιθυμία (Ambivelence) (Dr. Dreez) (Whole Album Produced by Mithridatis & Mihalis Papathanasiou)
- Η Με Την Εκλίπουσα Φιλίαν (Friendship With The Departed) (Dr. Dreez) (Produced by Mithridatis)
- Dreezoni Dreezonaki (Dr. Dreez) (Produced by Mithridatis & Mihalis Papathanasiou)

=== 1998 ===
- Βραχυκύκλωμα (Short Circuit) (Vaggelis Germanos feat. Imiskoumbria)
- Dick Tracy (S.U.F.F.I.X. feat. Mithridatis)
- Η Πρώτη Επαφή (First Contact) (Pritanis Remix) (Goin' Through) (Produced by Pritanis)'

=== 1999 ===
- Ο Παπαγάλος (The Parrot)

=== 2000 ===
- Φάρμακο (Medicine) (SoulBro feat. Imiskoumbria)
- Στόχος Είναι (The Goal Is) (Diodos) (Produced by Pritanis)
- Στρατιώτης Πεζικού (Infantry Soldier) (Diodos) (Produced by Pritanis)
- Το Πάρτυ Με Τα Ούζα (Party With Ouzo) (Kavourodeinosavroi) (Extra Vocals by Dimitris Mentzelos)
- Ο Φονιάς (The Killer) (Kavourodeinosavroi) (Produced and Backing Vocals by Pritanis)
- Διαφημιστικό (Commercial Spot) (Kavourodeinosavroi) (Vocals by Pritanis)

=== 2001 ===
- Πορτραίτο (Portrait) (Vasilis Kazoulis feat. Dimitris Mentzelos)
- Τι Γυρεύεις Μες Στην Κίνα Τζάκι Τσαν (What Are You Looking For In China Jackie Chan) (Manolis Rasoulis feat. Imiskoumbria)
- 10 Λεπτά Κήρυγμα (10 Minutes Of Preaching) (Kavourodeinosavroi) (Produced by Pritanis)

=== 2004 ===
- Ελεύθερη Σχέση (Open Relationship) (Pamela feat. Imiskoumbria)

=== 2005 ===
- Μπισκοτάκι Γεμιστό (Stuffed Biscuit) (Etsi De feat. Dimitris Mentzelos)
- Μίκυ Μάου (Mickey Mouse) (Etsi De feat. Imiskoumbria)
- Σέξυ Κοπελιά (Sexy Lady) (Sexpyr feat. Imiskoumbria)
- Ρίχτους Μια Τούρτα (Throw Them A Cake) (Sexpyr feat. Mithridatis)
- Sexpyrience (Sexpyr) (Whole Album Produced by Mithridatis, Pritanis & DJ Vanilla)
- Χάσμα Γενεών (Generation Gap) (Sexpyr feat. Dimitris Mentzelos)
- Ο Σοφός (The Wiseman) (Giannis Logothetis feat. Imiskoumbria)
- Η Αγάπη Θέλει Υπερβολή (Love Needs Hyperbole) (Valantis feat. Imiskoumbria)

=== 2006 ===
- Bling Bling Pt. 2 (Haji Mike feat. Imiskoumbria)

=== 2007 ===
- Είμαι Και Γ*μώ (I'm Awesome)(Sexpyr feat. Dimitris Mentzelos)
- Πίνω (I Drink) (Goin' Through feat. Dimitris Mentzelos)

=== 2009 ===
- Προσοχή Σκύλος Δαγκώνει (Warning The Dog Bites) (Lavrentis Machairitsas feat. Imiskoumbria)
- Θέλω Να Αγαπήσω Την Μπαργούμαν (I Want To Love The Barwoman) (TUS feat. Sexpyr & Mithridatis)
- Μπιρίμπα (Biriba) (Polina feat. Mithridatis)
- Πάλι Καλοκαίρι (Summer Again) (Mario Mental feat. Mithridatis & Elena Anagiotou)

=== 2010 ===
- Σε Πάρτυ RNB (At An RNB Party) (Cenobite feat. Dimitris Mentzelos)
- Είσαι Τρελός (You Are Mad) (Trendy Hooliguns feat. Dimitris Mentzelos)
- Μήνυμα ΔΜ (Delta Mee Message) (Dj The Boy feat. Dimitris Mentzelos)
- Καμιά Σαν Τη Ματίνα (Noone Like Matina) (Dj The Boy feat. Dimitris Mentzelos)
- Ο Βετεράνος (The Veteran) (Dj The Boy feat. Dimitris Mentzelos)

=== 2011 ===
- Γιατί; (Why?) (Sexpyr feat. Dimitris Mentzelos)
- Όλες Μοιάζουνε Πολύ (They Are All Very Similar) (Skies feat. Dimitris Mentzelos & Q.B. Mix)
- Θέλω Ένα Πάρτυ Με Τη Πάττυ (I Want A Party With Patty) (Apostoleas Loukakis) (Produced by Pritanis)
- Ραπ Τεχνικοί (Rap Technicians) (Sexpyr feat. Tafoplakioum) (Produced by Pritanis)
- Σαν Τη Γρανίτα (Like Granita) (Sexpyr feat. Alexandros Kontopidis) (Produced by Pritanis)
- Ο Ψαράς (The Fisherman) (Apostoleas Loukakis) (Produced by Pritanis)

=== 2012 ===
- Το Δικό Μου Hip Hop (My Hip Hop) (SMA feat. Dimitris Mentzelos)
- Αυτός Που Σε Σπάει (The One Who Breaks You) (Apostoleas Loukakis) (Produced by Pritanis)
- Πως Μ' Αγαπάς Πολύ (That You Love Me So Much (Apostoleas Loukakis) (Produced by Pritanis)

=== 2013 ===
- Σαλόνικα (Salonica) (DJ Tyler feat. Dimitris Mentzelos & Dodekatos Pithikos)
- Κύριε Μου (My Sir) (Trendy Hooliguns feat. Dimitris Mentzelos)
- Περαστικά (Get Better Soon) (Sigma Pi feat. Dimitris Mentzelos)

=== 2014 ===
- Καλοκαίρι Για Πάντα (Summer Forever) (Dimitris Mentzelos)

=== 2015 ===
- Μόνο Κρέας (Meat Only) (TRIPA Crew feat. Pritanis)

=== 2016 ===
- Έτσι Το Κάνουμε Εμείς (This Is How We Do It) (D-Light feat. Dimitris Mentzelos)

=== 2017 ===
- Έρχεται Καλοκαίρι Καυτό (Hot Summer On The Way) (Stelios MC feat. Dimitris Mentzelos)
- Party Made In Κρήτη (Party Made In Crete) (Al Yaida x Uncle Sam feat. Dimitris Mentzelos & Gogo Lidaki)
- Οι Δρόμοι (The Streets) (Dr. Dreez) (Co-Produced by Mithridatis)

== Music videos ==
=== 1996 ===
- Το Βουκολικό (The Bucolic) (Music composed by Mithridatis)
- Η Τσόντα (The Porn Flick) (Music composed by Mithridatis)

=== 1997 ===
- Η Πτώση (The Fall) Goin' Through with Dimitris Mentzelos & Artemis MC (Terror X Crew) (Music composed by Mihalis Papathanasiou (Goin' Through))
- Στην Ντισκοτέκ (In The Discothèque) with Elpida (Music composed by Kostas Tournas & Imiskoumbria)
- Ο Κύρης Του Σπιτιού (The Lord Of The House) (Music composed by Mithridatis & Pritanis)
- Je Suis Bossu with Foivos Dellivorias (Music composed by Mithridatis & Pritanis)
- Λέω Να Μην Πεθάνω (I'd Rather Not Die) Dr. Dreez (Music composed by Mithridatis & Mihalis Papathanasiou (Goin' Through)
- ΑΜΑΝ Ο Μπάρμαν (Oh That Barman) (Music composed by Imiskoumbria)

=== 1998 ===
- Η Μαγική Τσατσάρα (The Magic Comb) with UNEEK (Music composed by Imiskoumbria)
- ΜΕΘ Στο Βολαν (Drunk On The Steering) (Music composed by Pritanis)
- Δημόσιο Forevah (Public Forever) (Music composed by Mithridatis & Pritanis)
- Χορεύοντας Με Το Λίπος (Dancing With The Fat) (Music composed by AlphaVille & Mithridatis & Pritanis)

=== 1999 ===
- Πυρετός Το Σαββατόβραδο (Saturday Night Fever) with MLV (Music composed by Mithridatis & Pritanis)
- Νωρίς (Early) with Loukianos Kilaidonis (Music composed by Loukianos Kilaidonis, Imiskoumbria & Mihalis Papathanasiou (Goin' Through)
- Η Πεντάμορφη Και Ο Αστέρας (The Beauty And The Star) with Giannis Savvidakis (Music composed by Pritanis)
- Ο Παπαγάλος (The Parrot) (Music composed by Mithridatis & Prytanis)

=== 2000 ===
- Πιπινολάτρης Γερογόης (Young Girls Lover And Old Enchanter) Imiskoumbria & Mariletta (LA KLiKARiA) (Music composed by Pritanis)

=== 2001 ===
- Κοίτα Με (Look At Me) (Alithoria Mix) Imiskoumbria & Mariletta (LA KLiKARiA) (Music composed by Pritanis & Giorgos Papadimitriou)
- Πάμε Όλοι Μαζί Σε Μια Παραλία (Let's All Go To A Beach) with Mariletta (Music composed by Pritanis)
- Θέλω Να Το Κάνω Με Τη Μαμά Σου (I Wanna Do It With Your Mother) (Music composed by Mithridatis & Pritanis)
- Οι Λαϊκές (The Folksy Women) (Music composed by Mithridatis)
- Οι Κληρονόμοι (The Heirs) (Music composed by Mithridatis & Pritanis)

=== 2003 ===
- Σεισμός (Earthquake) (Music composed by Mithridatis & Pritanis)

=== 2004 ===
- Greek Lover (Music composed by Imiskoumbria)
- Το Σεξ (The Sex) (Music composed by Stamatis Kraounakis & Imiskoumbria)
- Ήπια 15 (I Drank 15) (P.I.M.P. Style/You Don't Stop Edition) with B-Sykes (Music composed by Pritanis)

=== 2005 ===
- Τζαμάικα (Jamaica) Sexpyr (Music composed by Mithridatis, Pritanis & DJ Vanilla)

=== 2006 ===
- Brazil - Imiz 1-0 (Music composed by Mithridatis & Mihalis Papathanasiou (Goin' Through)
- Αν Ήσουν Άλλος (If You Were Another Person) (Music composed by Mithridatis)
- Αντρικές Γουρουνιές/Το Σκληρό MP3 Του Δίσκου (The Hard MP3 Of The Disc) (Music composed by DJ Vanilla)

=== 2007 ===
- Τα Χριστούγεννα Σημαίνουν (Christmas Mean) (Music composed by Pritanis)
- Πάφα Πούφα Το Τσιγάρο (Puff Puff The Cigarette) (Music composed by Mithridatis & Pritanis)

=== 2009 ===
- Ποτέ (Never) Mithridatis (Music composed by Pritanis)
- Παγωτά (Ice Cream) Grigoris Kollias & Marios Tsagkaris with Mithridatis

=== 2010 ===
- Πώς Να Σου Το Πω (How Should I Say That To You) (Music composed by Pritanis)
- Άγιε Βασίλη, Μην Ξηγιέσαι (Santa Claus, Don't Act Like That) Mithridatis (Music composed by Pritanis)

=== 2011 ===
- Γιατί Δεν Μ' Αγαπάς Όπως Παλιά (Why Don't You Love Me) Dimitris Mentzelos with VHS (Music composed by Hank Williams)
- Α, Ρε Πατέρα (Oh, Father) Dimitris Mentzelos with Antigoni Katsouri (Music composed by DJ Alx)
- Ραπ Τεχνικοί (Rap Experts) Sexpyr with Tafoplakioum (Anorimoi) (Music composed by Pritanis)
- Σαν Τη Γρανίτα (Like The Water Ice) Sexpyr with Alexandros Kontopidis (Music composed by Pritanis)

=== 2012 ===
- L.A., L.A. Dimitris Mentzelos with Don Freaka (Music composed by Don Freaka)
- Όσα Και Να Πω (Whatever I Say) Dimitris Mentzelos with Disastah (SMA) (Music composed by DJ Space (SMA)
- Κρίση, Πτήση, Στύση (Crisis, Flight, Erection) Dimitris Mentzelos with Tiny Jackal & Killah-P (Music composed by Tiny Jackal)
- Ποιον αγαπάς? (Who Do You Love) VHS with Dimitris Mentzelos (Music composed by Spy BuonViaggio (VHS) & Pritanis)
- Τρέχα, Μαδαφάκα, Τρέχα (Run, Mothafucka, Run) Mithridatis (Music composed by DJ Tyler (Professional Sinnerz)
- Σαλόνικα (Salonica) Dimitris Mentzelos with Dodekatos Pithikos (Music composed by DJ Tyler (Professional Sinnerz)
- Πως Μ' Αγαπάς Πολύ (That You Love Me Very Much) Apostoleas Loukakis (Music composed by Pritanis)

=== 2013 ===
- Ντου Γιου Λοβ Μι (Do You Love Me) Mithridatis (Music composed by Mithridatis & Prophet Of Noise)
- Ανομολόγητα (The Ones That Shouldn't Be Said) Etsi De with Dimitris Mentzelos (Music composed by Filippos Gemelas & Dimitris Mountzourakis (Etsi De)
- Αυτός Που Σε Σπάει (The One Who Beats You) Apostoleas Loukakis (Music composed by Pritanis)
- Το Δικό Μου Hip Hop (My Hip Hop) SMA with Dimitris Mentzelos and Expe (Music composed by DJ Space(SMA)
- Μόνο Εσύ (Only You) Mithridatis VS Christiana (Music Composed by DJ S & Kostas Haritodiplomenos)
- Rock Rap Heavy Dimitris Mentzelos & Prejudice Reborn (Music Composed by Kanellopoulos/Konstas)

=== 2014 ===
- La Strada Dimitris Mentzelos & Prejudice Reborn (Music composed by Prejudice Reborn)
- Η Νύφη (The Bride) Mithridatis & Trendy HooliGuns (Music composed by Trendy HooliGuns)
- Σπιτουλίνι Αραχτουλίνι (Resting At Home) Mithridatis (Music composed by DJ Tyler(Professional Sinnerz)

=== 2015 ===
- Μόνο Κρέας (Meat Only) TRIPA Crew feat. Pritanis (Music composed by Pritanis)
- Έχω Πάρει Φωτιά (I'm On Fire) Dimitris Mentzelos feat. Tasos Krokodeilos & Mavros Ilos (Music composed by DJ Tyler (Professional Sinnerz)
- #GoogleDatShit Imiskoumbria, Sexpyr, Stereo Mike, Disastah, Sfalma, Mavros Ilos, TRIPA Crew & QB Mix (LA KLiKARiA) (Music composed by Pritanis)

=== 2016 ===
- Έτσι Το Κάνουμε Εμείς (This Is How We Do It) D-Light feat. Dimitris Mentzelos

=== 2017 ===
- Γλυκιά Ολντ'Σκουλιά (Sweet Old School) Mithridatis (Music Composed by DJ Tyler & Gerasimos Lavranos)
- Scream Your Lungs Out Dimitris Mentzelos & Prejudice Reborn feat. Donald D (Music Composed by Prejudice Reborn, Scratches & Sampling by DJ Funkonami)
- Έρχεται Καλοκαίρι Καυτό (Hot Summer On The Way) Stelios MC feat. Dimitris Mentzelos (Music Composed by Stelios MC)
- Party Made In Κρήτη (Party Made In Crete) Al Yaida & Dimitris Mentzelos feat. Gogo Lidaki
- Ace Of Spades Dimitris Mentzelos & Prejudice Reborn
- Frankenstein (Chapter 1-The Creator) Dimitris Mentzelos & Prejudice Reborn

=== 2018 ===
- Οι Δρόμοι (The Streets) Dr. Dreez (Music co-produced by Mithridatis)
- El Gato Loco Dimitris Mentzelos feat. Markos Koumaris
- Το Λάθος Άτομο (The Wrong Person) Mithridatis

=== 2019 ===
- Comics Dimitris Mentzelos
- Darth Mith Mithridatis
