= Mia Anapnoi =

Studio album by Antonis Remos
- Released: December 30, 2003
- Label: Sony

Mia Anapnoi (One Breath) is an album by Antonis Remos released in 2003, which was certified triple platinum selling more than 140,000 copies.

== Tracks listing ==
Its tracks are all titled in Greek:

- Mia anapnoi - One breath
- Stoma me stoma - Mouth with mouth
- Pia nomizis oti ise - Who do you think you are
- Noris - Early
- Kamia san esena - No one like you
- Kanenas den mbori na mas horisi - No one can split us apart
- Ego ime edo - I am here
- Ola hathikan - Everything got lost
- Na 'xera ti thes - If only I knew what you want
- Ma de yinete - But it can't happen
- Tora se thelo - I want you now
- Den ti fovame ti zoi - I'm not afraid of life
- Kamia yineka - No woman
- Nafthalini - Naphthalene

== See also ==
- Antonis Remos
