= Antonis Remos =

Greek singer

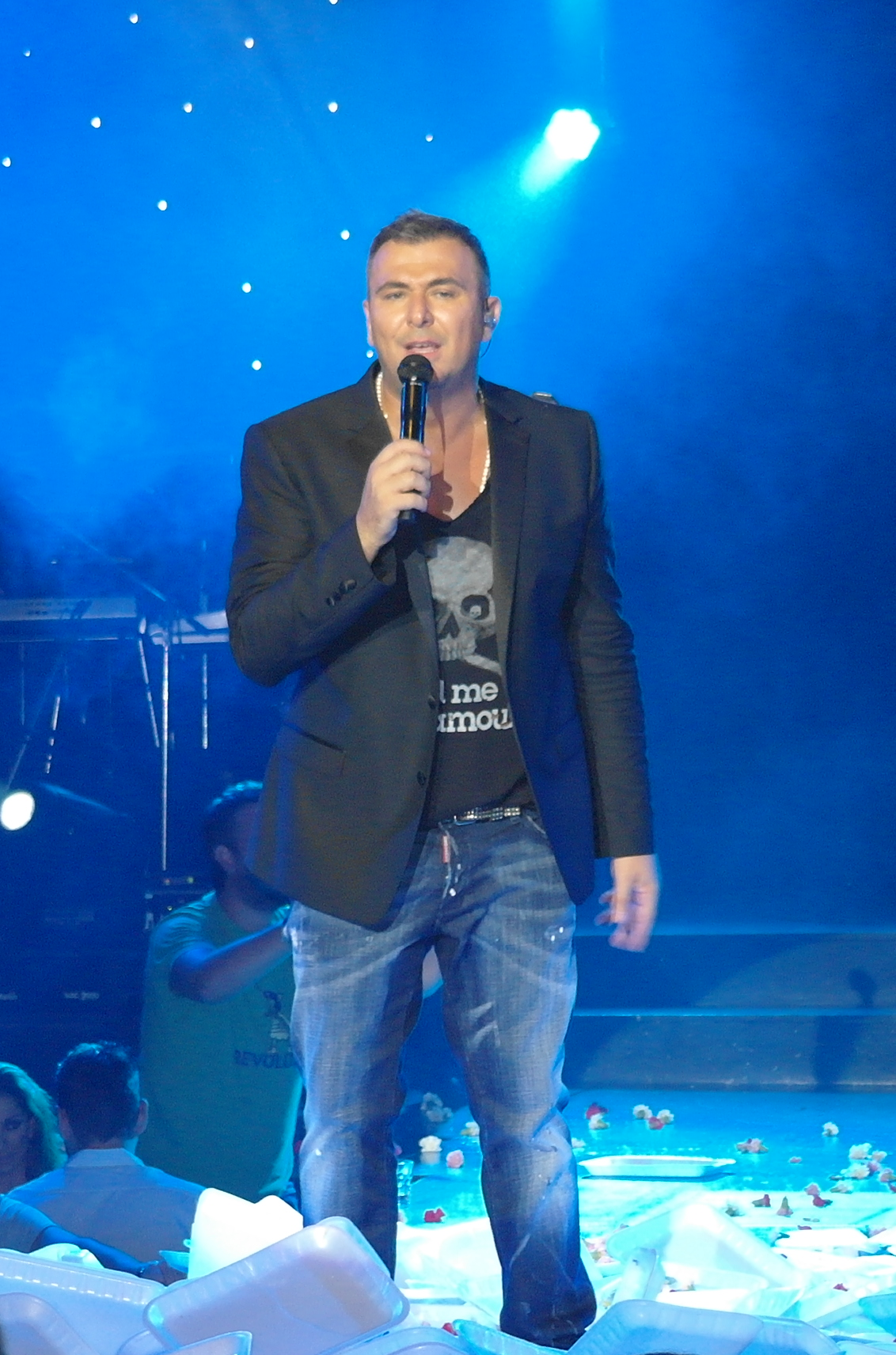
- Antonis Remos live at Politia.
- Born: Antonios Paschalidis; 19 June 1970 (age 55); Düsseldorf, West Germany
- Occupation: Singer
- Years active: 1996–present
- Spouse: Yvonne Bosnjak (m. 2018)
- Partner: Zeta Makripoulia (1999-2007)
- Children: 1
- Awards: Full list
- Musical career
- Genres: Laïko; modern laïko
- Instrument: Vocals
- Labels: Akti; Epic; Heaven Music; Panik Records
- Website: remosmusic.com

Antonis Remos (Greek: Αντώνης Ρέμος, pronounced [anˈdoniz ˈremos]; born Antonios Paschalidis, Greek: Αντώνιος Πασχαλίδης; 19 June 1970) is a Greek singer.

== Biography ==
=== Early life ===
He was born in Düsseldorf, West Germany. Later his family moved back to their native Thessaloniki, Greece, where he finished school. During his childhood he got involved with music and learned to play the guitar and drums.

=== First commercial success (1995–2000) ===
After many appearances in Thessaloniki, in 1995 Antonis Remos had his first live appearance in Athens. He performed live next to famous artists, such as Dimitris Mitropanos, Stefanos Korkolis and Marios Tokas. This same year he signed his first contract with Sony Music Greece, planning to release his first album. The first album which was released in 1996 and was titled after his name, became platinum in a few months. In April 1998, his second album, Kairos Na Pame Parakato ("Time to Move On") was released. For the first time, some of the most-prestigious Greek composers had given their songs to Antonis Remos, and for a second time in a row, the album gained platinum status. A year later, in December 1999, another album is released with the title “Pali ap’tin arxi” (Again from the beginning) in which he collaborates with big composers, such as Christos Nikolopoulos and Stamatis Spanoudakis. That record also becomes multi-platinum.

In March 2000, Remos performed the title song of the movie "I Agapi Einai Elefantas" ("Love is an elephant") written by Minos Matsas. The soundtrack gained gold status.

A CD single release followed, which was titled "Fly with me". It is actually a remix of the big hit "Meine" (Stay) having Danish artist Remee Guitar's rap-ing vocals. During winter 2000 Remos and Sakis Rouvas performed live together in Diogenis Palace.

=== Further success, Kardia Mou Min Anisiheis and Mia Anapnoi (2000–2005) ===
In June 2001 he released a double live CD from a party given in Apollon Palace titled Mia Nihta Mono ("Only for a night"). The album gained double platinum status.

During winter 2001, Antonis Remos performed live next to Giannis Parios. A CD single was also released in 2001. In spring 2002 Remos released the new album Kardia Mou Min Anisiheis ("Don't worry, my love"). Its songs were written by Giorgos Theofanous. The album gained triple platinum status, becoming one of the most-popular albums through the years.

During winter 2002, Remos performed live next to Alkistis Protopsalti. They kept performing together during the summer in Thessaloniki. They also traveled abroad, giving concerts all over Canada and the USA. In 2003, he released a new album titled Mia Anapnoi ("A breath"), and the songs were written once again by Giorgos Theofanous. The album gained triple platinum status.

During winter 2003 Remos had live performances. He shared the stage with 5 composers, each one for 45 nights: Mimis Plessas, Giannis Spanos, Antonis Vardis, Kostas Hatzis and Giorgos Theofanous.

In the same period, Remos sang Mikis Theodorakis' songs "An thymitheis to oniro mou" ("If you remember my dream") and "Faedra". They were both released in a CD single and became the title song of a completely new TV series.

During summer 2004, the Mikis Theodorakis orchestra presented the composer's music written for theatrical plays and movies, with Remos as the lead voice, along with the actors Petros Filipidis, Natassa Manisalis and Giannis Samsiaris. He released a live recording of the appearances next to the 5 big composers. The album gained double platinum status. Later that winter Antonis Remos appeared live with George Dalaras, in the brand-new "Athens Arena". After the discovery of a scandal, Antonis Remos was forced to serve his army obligations. Because of his age, he served only for forty days.

=== San Anemos and Alithies & Psemata (2005–present) ===
In 2005, Antonis Remos performed live in Athens Arena for a second year in the row. This time he sang with Michalis Hatzigiannis. Also in 2005, his new album "San Anemos" ("Like a wind")was released. It was the third album with composer Giorgos Theofanous. In this album, 3 singers joined Antonis Remos in 3 different songs. The first song was with Marinella, the second song with the famous singer Giorgos Margaritis, and the third song was with the Italian artist Massimo Di Cataldo. The album gained double platinum status. During winter 2006 Antonis Remos appeared live in the Athens Arena, but this time next to Marinella, a Greek singer who was restarting her live appearances.

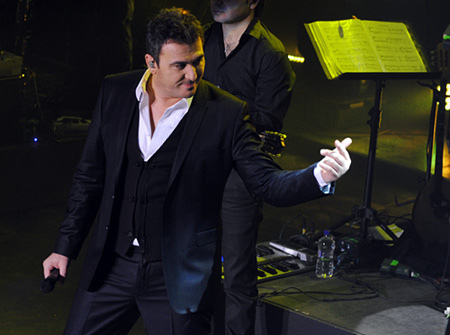
Remos performing live at Diogenis Studios in late 2010.

Antonis Remos celebrated his 10 years in discography by releasing a triple Best Of album with Sony BMG Greece which went platinum. In summer 2007, Remos did a tour around Greece, giving 25 sold-out concerts for the first time after 10 years. He had with him a new band from Thessaloniki named "Onirama". Antonis Remos and Onirama met in MAD TV's secret concert that was given in February and from that night, a new album was released. Hit songs of Antonis Remos were "retouched" by Onirama, gaining platinum status under the title "Antonis Remos in Concert feat. Onirama".

In the winter of 2007 he performed for a second year with Marinella in Athens Arena. The two artists continued these performances until March 2008.

Afterwards, Remos and Sakis Rouvas joined forces for a worldwide tour in Canada, the United States, Australia and Africa, from 13 March to 25 May. In winter 2008, Remos performed alone for the first time in the Athens Arena. The success was huge, and the appearances got an extension until the end of May. At the same time he released his eight studio album Alithies & Psemata ("Truths and Lies"). The album gained gold status immediately, and later platinum.

On 16 March, Antonis Remos began his first European tour in Brussels, Stuttgart, Frankfurt, Nuremberg, Düsseldorf, Amsterdam, the Stockholm, London, Istanbul, Belgrade, Tel Aviv. Later this summer Remos along with Emigre gave concerts throughout Greece.

In 2009 Antonis Remos presented in Athens the biggest and most impressive Live Show that Greeks have ever seen. Titled "Night and Day" in Athens Arena, Antonis Remos introduced a different kind of entertainment. The show was on for more than 5 months and it was a sold out every day, coming up to at least 350.000 people have visited.

In 2010 he released a new song called "Terma i Istoria", and presented it live through his show "Love Stories" in Diogenis Studio, another year of sold out appearances.

Antonis Remos has travelled around the world. He has performed live with different people of the international music scene, such as Julio Inglesias (Myconos 2014), Gloria Gaynor (New York & Athens 2014), Danny Brialliant (Myconos 2015), Zeljko Joksimovic (Belgrade & Athens), Gipsy Kings (Myconos 2016).

His latest album "Spasmena kommatia tis kardias" has already gained platinum status on the first week of release.

== Personal life ==
On 14 July 2007, Remos became the president of the Iraklis F.C. club. In May 2010, Remos left Iraklis F.C. management.

=== Relationships ===
From March 1999 to September 2007 Remos had been in a relationship with actress and tv presenter Zeta Makripoulia. They met at Pop Corn Music Awards 1998.

In 2010 Remos began dating German fashion designer Yvonne Bosnjak. They have one daughter, Eleni (b. 14 February 2015). The couple married on 15 September 2018 at the estate of Dimitris Kontominas in Varympompi.

== Discography ==
=== Studio albums ===
All the albums listed underneath were released and charted in Greece.

Year	Title	Certification
June 1996	Gia Na Tin Kerdiseis	2× Platinum
April 1998	Kairos Na Pame Parakato	2× Platinum
November 1999	Pali Ap'Tin Arhi	2× Platinum
May 2002	Kardia Mou Min Anisiheis	4× Platinum
October 2003	Mia Anapnoi	3× Platinum
November 2005	San Anemos	2× Platinum
October 2008	Alithies & Psemata	2× Platinum
March 2011	Kleista Ta Stomata	5× Platinum
May 2013	I Kardia Me Pigainei Emena	3× Platinum
December 2016	Spasmena Kommatia Tis Kardias	3× Platinum
December 2023	Panta & Pote vol.1	

=== Live albums ===
Year	Title	Certification
2001	Mia Nihta Mono	2× Platinum
2004	Live	2× Platinum
2007	Antonis Remos In Concert feat. ONIRAMA	Platinum
2007	Marinella & Antonis Remos – Live	Platinum

=== CD singles ===
Year	Title	Notes
2002	Olos O Kosmos Ise Esi	2× Platinum
2002	Kardia Mou	–
2003	Den Teliosame	–
2009	Dio Istories Agapis	–
2010	Kommena Pia Ta Daneika	–

=== Compilations ===
Year	Title	Notes
2006	Best Of	Platinum
2014	Best Of 2008 - 2014	2× Platinum

== Awards ==
2019: Награда Браћа Карић
