= Pop Corn Music Awards 1994 =

- Awarded for: Votes by readers of Greek music publication Pop Corn and viewers of Mega Channel
- Date: March 1995
- Location: Athens
- Country: Greece
- Hosted by: Sophia Vossou

Television/radio coverage
- Network: Mega Channel

The fourth Annual Pop Corn Music Awards for 1994, in Athens, Greece. The awards recognised the most popular artists and albums in Greece from the year 1994 as voted by readers of the Greek music publication, Pop Corn. The event was hosted by singer Sophia Vossou in March 1995. The Pop Corn Music Awards were discontinued in 2002.

== Performances ==
Artist(s)	Song(s)
Sabrina	"Feggaria-Kathreftes"
Lambis Livieratos	"As Eiha Ti Dynami"
Giorgos Alkaios	"Den Peirazei"
Sakis Rouvas	"Ela Mou"
Antonis Vardis	"Den Tha Me Ksehaseis"
Yaki-Da	"I Saw You Dancing"
Terry Hall	"Forever J"
Sean Maguire	"Take This Time"
Kostas Tournas	"Kiries Kai Kyri" "Kato Ap' Tin Akropoli" "Anapse Fotia" "Stigmes" "Len" "O Achilleas Ap To Kairo" "Anthrope Agape" (ft. Alexia & Christos Dantis)
Christos Dantis	"Psakse Me"
Alexia	"Hali Kali"
Katy Garbi	"Nai, Yparho Ego" "Pes To M'Ena Fili" "Tou Feggariou Anapnoes" "Nterti" "Akouo Ti Kardoula Sou" "Atofio Hrysafi"
Christos Dantis	"Kapios S'Agapaei"
VIPS	"Einai Psema"
Christos Dantis	"Moro Mou Esi"

== Winners and nominees ==
Best Video Clip	Best Breakthrough Artist
Giorgos Gavalos – "Feggaria-Kathreftes" (Sabrina); Kostas Kapetanidis – "Ethinikos" (Michalis Rakintzis); Giorgos Sofoulis – "Me Ta Matia Na To Les" (Giorgos Mazonakis); Dimitris Sotas – "As Eiha Ti Dynami" (Lambis Livieratos); Ilias + Giorgos Psinakis – "Ksehase To" (Sakis Rouvas)	Lambis Livieratos; Dimitris Kokotas; Elina Konstantopoulou; Eleni Peta; Aris Samoladas
Best Laiko Dance Song	Best Interpretation
Ekeinos+Ekeinos & Katy Grei – "Mia Ginaika Mono Kserei"; Christos Nikolopoulos & Eleni Tsaligopoulou – "Ston Aggelon Ta Bouzoukia"; Angela Dimitriou – "Kleise Fota Kleise Matia"; Elina Konstantopoulou – "Otan To Tileofono Htypisei"; Alkistis Protopsalti – "Ta Pio Oraia Laika"	Alexia – "Sklava"; Christos Dantis – "Kapios S'Agapaei"; Evridiki – "Misise Me"; Thanos Kalliris – "Ela Feggari Mou"; Mando – "Thelei Anempo I Agapi"
Most Likeable	Most Played Artist
Giorgos Alkaios	Sakis Rouvas
Album of the Year	Song of the Year
Alexia – Ta Klassika; Christos Dantis – "Tessera"; Stefanos Korkolis – "Hamenes Atlantides"; Manto – "Anisiho Vlemma"; Kostas Tournas – "Doueta"	Christos Dantis – "Kapios S'Agapei"; Katy Garbi – "Nai Yparho Ego"; Christos Dantis – "Kapios S'Agapei"; Evridiki – "Enas Ziliaris Ouranos"; Stefanos Korkolis – "Eisai Asteri"; Kostas Bigalis – "Mou Lipeis"
Best Composition	Best Group
Stefanos Korkolis – "Eisai Asteri" (Stefanos Korkolis)	VIPS; VIPS; Ekeinos+Ekeinos; Magic De Spell; Nama; O.P.A.
Best Lyric	Best Artwork
Giannis Karalis – "Psakse Me" (Christos Dantis); Eleni Giannatsoulia – "To Ksero Eisai Moni" (Sakis Rouvas); Giorgos Theofanous – "Misise Me" (Evridiki); Anna Ioannidou – "Eisai Asteri" (Stefanos Korkolis); Iro Trigoni – "Thelei Anemo I Agapi" (Manto)	Giannis Doxas – Kapio Kalokairi (Thanos Kalliris); Giannis Doxas – I Eleni Ton Feggarion (Eleni Dimou); Petros Paraschis – Ah Kita Me (Giorgos Alkaios); Alkistis Spiliotis – Trahon Horos (O.P.A.)
Male Artist of the Year	Female Artist of the Year
Christos Dantis; Giorgos Alkaios; Thanos Kalliris; Stefanos Korkolis; Kostas Bigalis	Mando; Alexia; Sophia Vossou; Katy Garbi; Evridiki
International
Best Group	Take That
Best Male Artist	Bryan Adams
Best Female Artist	Mariah Carey
Best Single	Jon Bon Jovi - "Always"
Best Album	Mariah Carey - "Music Box"
Best Video Clip	Jon Bon Jovi - "Always"
Innovation Award
MTV
Achievement Award
Kostas Tournas
