= Pop Corn Music Awards 1995 =

- Awarded for: Voted by readers of Greek music publication Pop Corn magazine
- Date: March 1996
- Location: Aliki Theatre (Athens)
- Country: Greece
- Hosted by: Apostolos Gletsos; Natalia Germanou
- Most awards: Stefanos Korkolis (3)
- Most nominations: Evridiki (8)

Television/radio coverage
- Network: Star Channel

The fifth Annual Pop Corn Music Awards in 1995, at the Aliki Theatre, in Athens, Greece. The awards recognized the most popular artists and albums in Greece from the year 1995 as voted by readers of Greek music publication Pop Corn. The ceremony was hosted by Apostolos Gletsos and Natalia Germanou. The Pop Corn Music Awards were discontinued in 2002.

== Performances ==
Artist(s)	Song(s)
Dionysis Schinas	"Pote"
Giannis Savvidakis	"To Koritsi Mou Kimate"
Stella Konitopoulou	"Eisai To Diko Mou Lathos" "Pesto Gelio" "Ma Esi Eisai Allou"
Antzy Samiou	"Aggelos Ksanthos" "Salomi" "Ponos Kai Klamata"
Le Mans	"Marseille"
World Apart	"Everybody" "Baby Come Back"
Rena Vlahopoulou	"Greek Film Medley"
Katy Garbi	"Atofio Hrysafi"
Stefanos Korkolis	"Eho Mia Diesthisi"
Litsa Giagkousi	"Sto Limanaki" "Oti Ki An Ginei" "Oh Aman"
Thanos Kalliris	"To Nou Sou Kirie Odige"
Sakis Rouvas	"Ksana"
Michalis Rakintzis	"Moro Mou Faltso" "Ticheroula" "I Proti Apili" "I Rossi"
Christos Dantis	"Trello Ki Agapisiariko"
Anna Vissi	"Eleni"

== Winners and nominees ==
Best Video Clip	Most Likeable Artist
Stefanos Korkolis – "Me To Simadi Tou Skorpiou" (Giorgos Gavalos); Anna Vissi – "Eimai Poli Kala" (Nikos Soulis); Evridiki – "Fthinoporo Ginaikas" (Dimitris Sotas); Lambis Livieratos – "Kai Ego Sou Eksigo" (Nikos Antonopoulos); Sakis Rouvas – "Ela Mou" (Kostas Kapetanidis)	Giannis Savvidakis; Giorgos Alkaios; Sophia Vossou; Sakis Rouvas; Lambis Livieratos
Best Breakthrough Artist	Best Live Performance
Dionysis Schinas; Goin Through; Markos; Praksis; Viktoria Halkiti	Sakis Rouvas; Anna Vissi; Evridiki; Lambis Livieratos; Viktoria Halkiti
Album of the Year	Song of the Year
Katy Garbi – Atofio Hrysafi; Evridiki – Fthinoporo Ginaikas; Thanos Kalliris – Kapoio kalokairi; Stefanos Korkolis – Eho Mia Diesthisi; Sakis Rouvas – Aima, Dakrya & Idrotas	Sakis Rouvas – "Ksana"; Evridiki – "Fthinoporo Ginaikas"; Thanos Kalliris – "Kapio Kalokairi"; Stefanos Korkolis – "Me To Simadi Tou Skorpiou"; Giannis Savvidakis – "I Magemeni Sou Matia"
Best Duet	Best Laiko Dance Song
Stefanos Korkolis & Francesca Schiavo – "Se Thelo (Ti Voglio)"; Thanos Kalliris & Lorna – "Kerdisame"; Nikos Karvelas & Anna Vissi – "Metra"; Sophia Vossou & Stamatis Gonidis – "De M' Agapas"; Katy Garbi & Dionysis Schinas – "Zisame"	Katy Garbi – "Ksipoliti Horevo"; Giorgos Mazonakis – "Mi Mou Zitas"; Dimitris Mitropanos – "Ta Ladadika"; Notis Sfakianakis – "O Aetos"; Paschalis Terzis – "Astatos"
Best Lyric	Best Group
Kostas Trigonis – "Fovamai" (Evridiki); Kostas Tournas – "Mi Me Sigkrineis" (Katy Garbi); Giannis Doxas – "Ohi Ohi To Moro Mou" (Thanos Kalliris); Evi Droutsa – "Eho Mia Diesthisi" (Stefanos Korkolis); Panos Falaras – "I Megemeni sou Matia" (Giannis Savvidakis)	Zik Zak; Goin' Through; Kaka Koritsia; Magic De Spell; Nama
Best Composition	Best Vocal Abilities
Stefanos Korkolis – "Eho Mia Diesthisi" (Stefanos Korkolis); Giorgos Theofanous – "Fovamai" (Evridiki); Nikos Karvelas – "Ragise O Kathreftis" (Nikos Karvelas); Phoebus – "Kapio Kalokairi" (Thanos Kalliris); Kostas Haritodiplomenos – "An Eheis Theo" (Kostas Haritodiplomenos)	Thanos Kalliris – "To Nou Sou Kirie Odige"; Anna Vissi – "Re"; Evridiki – "Kaliteres Stigmes"; Stefanos Korkolis – "Eho Mia Diesthisi"; Sakis Rouvas – "Aima, Dakrya & Idrotas"
Best Male Artist	Best Female Artist
Christos Dantis; Giorgos Alkaios; Thanos Kalliris; Stefanos Korkolis; Sakis Rouvas	Anna Vissi; Alexia; Evridiki; Elina Konstantopoulou; Mando
International
Best Group	Take That
Best Male Artist	Michael Jackson
Best Female Artist	Mariah Carey
Best Breakthrough Artist	Boyzone
Best Single	Coolio - "Gangsta's Paradise"
Best Album	Michael Jackson - "HIStory"
Best Video Clip	Madonna - "Human Nature"
Achievement Award
Rena Vlahopoulou
