= Pop Corn Music Awards 1996 =

- Awarded for: votes by readers of Greek music publication Pop Corn magazine
- Date: 1997
- Location: Aliki Theatre (Athens)
- Country: Greece
- Hosted by: Petros Filipidis; Natalia Germanou
- Most awards: Katy Garbi (4)
- Most nominations: Anna Vissi (6); Christos Dantis (6)

Television/radio coverage
- Network: Star Channel

The sixth Annual Pop Corn Music Awards in 1996, at the Aliki Theatre, in Athens, Greece. The awards recognized the most popular artists and albums in Greece from the year 1996 as voted by readers of Greek music publication Pop Corn. The ceremony was hosted by Petros Filipidis and Natalia Germanou in March, 1997. The Pop Corn Music Awards were discontinued in 2002.

== Performances ==
Artist(s)	Song(s)
Giorgos Alkaios	"Parapono"
Antonis Remos	"Gia Na Tin Kerdiseis"
Stella Georgiadou	"Lioma"
Sakis Rouvas	"Mi M'Agapiseis"
Antonis Vardis	"Den Tha Me Ksehaseis" "Tha Thela Na Isouna Edo"
Giorgos Alkaios	"Me Dyo Marmarina Filia"
Katy Garbi	"Perasmena Ksehasmena"
Kaka Koritsia	"Irthes Pali (O Dolofonos)"
Viktoria Halkiti	"Star to Wish On"
Anna Vissi	"Paralio"
Sakis Rouvas	"Tora Arhizoun Ta Dyskola"
Lambis Livieratos	"Mpam Kai Kato"
Thanos Kalliris	"Poses Fores"
Anna Vissi	"Ekatommiria"

== Winners and nominees ==
Best Video Clip	Most Liked Artist
Stefanos Korkolis – "Ksespasa" (Manos Adamakis); Evridiki – "Na Me Kitas" (Giorgos Gavalos); Christos Dantis – "Trelo Ki Agapisiariko" (Nikos Soulis); Marina Skiadaresi – "Stin Pigi Mia Kopela" (Dimitris Sotas); Dionysis Shinas – "Ti Trela Mou Zitas" (Manolis Tzirakis)	Giorgos Alkaios; Viktoria Halkiti; Sofia Arvaniti; Despina Vandi; Dionysis Shinas
Best Breakthrough Artist	Best Live Performance
Antonis Remos; Imiskoumbria; Omega Vibes; Pimis Petrou; Fiona Tzavara	Sakis Rouvas; Evridiki; Lambis Livieratos; Anna Vissi; Viktoria Halkiti
Album of the Year	Song of the Year
Katy Garbi – Arhizo Polemo; Anna Vissi – Klima Tropiko; Dimitris Kokotas – Sineidisi; Stefanos Korkolis – Ksespasa; Sakis Rouvas – Tora Arhizoun Ta Dyskola	Sakis Rouvas – "Tora Arhizoun Ta Dyskola"; Giorgos Alkaios – "Me Dyo Marmarina Filia"; Christos Dantis – "Trelo Ki Agapisiariko"; Stefanos Korkolis – "Ksespasa"; Lambis Livieratos – "Mpam Kai Kato"
Best Duet	Best Laiko Dance Song
Vasilis Karras & Konstantina – "To Dilitirio"; Christos Dantis & Katerina Topazi – "An"; Nikos Karvelas & Anna Vissi – "Vre Kouto"; Antonis Remos & Manto – "Emeis"; Kostas Tournas, Christos Dantis & Vlassis Mponatsos – "Astes Na Kimatizoune"	Katy Garbi – "Perasmena Ksehasmena"; Anna Vissi – "Sentonia"; Dimitris Kokotas – "Anemona"; Giorgos Mazonakis – "Mou Lipis"; Notis Sfakianakis – "Mia Matia Sou Mono Ftanei"
Best Lyric	Best Group
Katy Garbi – "Arhizo Polemo" (Giannis Doksas); Mando – "Ston Evdomo Ourano" (Ifigenia Giannopoulou); Despina Vandi – "Esena Perimeno" (Natalia Germanou); Stefanos Korkolis – "Vradies Aipnies" (Efi Droutsa); Evridiki – "Gia Pian Agapi Mou Milas" (Kostas Trigonis)	Kaka Koritsia; Ekeinos + Ekeinos; O.P.A; RIFIFI; Stereo Nova
Best Composition	Best Vocal Abilities
Katy Garbi – "Tha Melagholiso" (Phoebus); Evridiki – "Gia Pian Agapi Mou Milas" (Giorgos Theofanous); Thanos Kalliris – "I Aniksi Den Menei Pia Edo" (Thanos Kalliris); Sakis Rouvas – "Mi Magapiseis" (Nikos Karvelas); Stefanos Korkolis – "Ksespasa" (Stefanos Korkolis)	Anna Vissi – "Paralio"; Despina Vandi – "Esena Perimeno"; Christos Dantis – "Monima"; Thanos Kalliris – "Poses Fores"; Mando – "Pistevo"
Best Male Artist	Best Female Artist
Thanos Kalliris; Giorgos Alkaios; Christos Dantis; Sakis Rouvas; Dimitris Kokotas	Anna Vissi; Despina Vandi; Katy Garbi; Evridiki; Mando
International
Best Group	Boyzone
Best Male Artist	George Michael
Best Female Artist	Celine Dion
Best Breakthrough Artist	Peter Andre
Best Single	Toni Braxton - "Un-Break My Heart"
Best Album	Celine Dion - "Falling into You"
Best Video Clip	George Michael - "Fastlove"
Innovation Award
MAD TV
Radio Sfera 102.1 Song of the Year
Anna Vissi – "Sentonia"
Achievement Award
Antonis Vardis
