= Ankudinov =

Ankudinov (Russian: Анкуди́нов) is a Russian surname. The feminine variant is Ankudinova (Анкуди́нова).

It may refer to:

- Andrey Ankudinov (born 1962), Soviet and Russian actor
- Diana Ankudinova (born 2003), Russian singer
- Ivan Ankudinov (1906 - 1944), Soviet military officer
- Mikhail Ankudinov (1905 - 1974), Soviet general
- Timofey Ankudinov (1617 - 1654), Russian poet
