= Diana Ankudinova =

Russian singer (born 2003)

Diana Ankudinova Диана Анкудинова
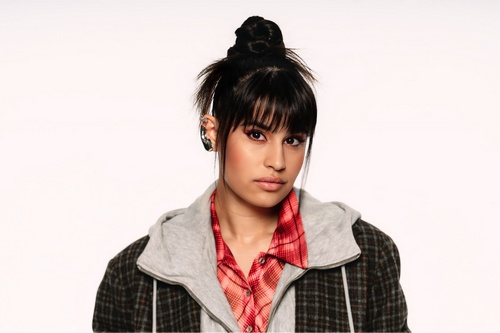
- Ankudinova in 2025

Background information
- Born: May 31, 2003 (age 23); Primorsky Territory. Russia
- Genres: Pop, Folk, Rock, Chanson
- Occupation: Singer
- Instruments: Vocals, piano, ukulele
- Years active: (regional level) 2008-present; (national level) 2017-present
- Website: dianaankudinova.ru Pronunciation of Diana Ankudinova

Diana Dmitrievna Ankudinova (Russian: Диана Дмитриевна Анкудинова, born May 31, 2003) is a Russian singer. Much of her initial fame resulted from her winning two consecutive seasons of You Are Super!, a talent competition show on the Russian NTV network for children who have spent some significant part of their childhood without parental care. Diana Ankudinova's performances were posted on the NTV web site and the NTV YouTube channel, where they soon gained hundreds of millions of views around the world. Diana Ankudinova sings mostly in Russian, English and French. She has also sung in other languages including Spanish, German and Arabic.

== Early life ==
Diana Ankudinova was born on May 31, 2003, in the far eastern Primorsky Territory of Russia in an area north of the city of Vladivostok. Diana's biological mother physically abused her.

At the age of three, Diana was left at a bus stop in the winter with a broken collarbone. Diana was rescued from the street, but Diana's rescuers were unable to care for the traumatized child. They made a statement about the abuse of Diana to the local prosecutor, and it was agreed that the young Diana should be turned over to the care of an orphanage in Primorsky Territory which provided for the care of abandoned young children in the general area.

Children from the orphanage were periodically sent to a sanatorium in Arsenyev to help them regain and maintain their physical and mental health. A massage therapist, Irina Anatolyevna Ponik, who worked at the sanatorium developed a special affection for Diana. The daughter of Irina Ponik, who sometimes visited her mother at work, was the one who first began to insist that her mother adopt Diana.

In 2008, Irina Ponik filed the necessary paperwork to assume formal legal guardianship of Diana Ankudinova with the territorial department of guardianship and trusteeship. The new family lived in Arsenyev. In 2012, the family moved far away to the city of Tolyatti in the Samara Oblast of southwestern Russia.

The move to Tolyatti was mostly due to Diana's fears that her biological mother might try to find and abuse Diana or even attempt to regain custody of Diana. These fears were so intense that they had been significantly affecting young Diana's mental health. Irina Ponik, Diana's adoptive mother, had previously lived in Tolyatti. Tolyatti was also much closer to Moscow, which was the city where Diana and her family believed she would find the greatest opportunities for her future musical education and career.

== Musical career ==
=== Career beginnings ===
At the age of four-and-a-half years, Diana's speech was extremely poor, with stuttering and other problems. Speech pathologists recommended that she be given singing lessons to improve her general speech and vocal skills. She quickly discovered that she loved singing.

The head of the brass band of the city of Arsenyev, Alexander Varnamov, was the first to say that Diana had a knack for singing and a musical ear. He predicted that Diana would have a great future as a singer.

Diana's instructors also noticed her unusual vocal abilities in her singing. Alexander Varnamov made an agreement with Elena Kazantseva, head of the vocal pop ensemble Zhemchuzhinki (Pearls), so that she would accept Diana into the collective. She also sang in a duet "Malinki" under the direction of Elena Kazantseva.

Diana entered the Elegance vocal and choreographic school under the guidance of Anna Pekhtereva in the city of Arsenyev.

Diana began entering many vocal contests while still very young. She also began singing in public events at every opportunity that was presented to her.

After the move to Tolyatti, Diana continued singing in public at every opportunity and continued to enter many vocal competitions. She began studying vocals at the Melody circle of the Tolyatti House of Culture where she took vocal lessons from Svetlana Vovk.

Diana played one of the main roles in the musical Teremok with the Russian orchestra of the Tolyatti Philharmonic in November 2014.

At the theater and music studio at DKIT under Dmitry Marfin, she performed in:

- Visiting the Fairy Tale (musical)
- Tom Sawyer and His Friends (jazz musical) as Becky Thatcher
- Silver Hoof (opera) as Muryonka the cat
- Vovka in the Jazz Kingdom (musical)
- New Adventures of Electronics (musical)

Some of her notable prizes and diplomas include:

- 2010 – Solo Diploma-recipient of the 15th regional competition of vocalists Voices of Primorye and Laureate of the 1st degree as part of the vocal duet Malinki
- 2011 – In Harbin in China, she participated as part of the Malinki duet in the Second International Festival of Young Artists' Competition "Planet of Childhood", having won the gold medal in the pop vocal category.
- 2012 – She participated in the second Superfinal of the International project Salute of Talents in Moscow and became a laureate of the superfinal.
- 2013 – She won the Grand Prix of the regional competition for children and youth creativity Kind Heart at the festival Bereginya in the nomination "soloists – pop vocal".
- 2014 – She became the Silver Voice of the All-Russian competition-festival Talents of the land of Volga.
- January 2017 – She received the diploma of the 1st degree Laureate, semi-finalist of the International Competition for Children and Youth Creativity "Art Premium" with the support of the Federation Council of the Federal Assembly of the Russian Federation, the Presidential Administration of the Russian Federation, the Ministry of Education of the Russian Federation, and the Government of Moscow of Moscow city.
- April 2017 – She won the gold medal of the XVI All-Russian Youth Delphic Games in the category "Variety Singing" – finishing first among 39 participants.

=== 2017: The Voice Kids Russia ===
In late 2016, Diana Ankudinova passed the non-televised preliminary auditions for season 4 of the Russian The Voice Kids. She appeared on the blind auditions of the show that were televised on February 17, 2017. Diana sang "Jodel Time" which was originally performed by the Swiss band Oesch's die Dritten. None of the judges selected Diana, so she was eliminated from the competition. Before Diana left the stage, however, the judges asked her to sing a part of another song. She then sang a part of the Édith Piaf song "Non, je ne regrette rien" in French.

As a result of her televised performance on Russia's The Voice Kids, Diana became so popular with the public that she became the first person on The Voice projects to gain more than a million views on YouTube after failing to pass the initial televised blind auditions on the show.

=== 2018–2019: You Are Super! (Ты супер!) ===
You Are Super! (Ты супер! in Russian) is a talent competition show on the Russian NTV television network. It is for disadvantaged children who have spent some significant part of their childhood without parental care.

Diana Ankudinova won the 2018 season of You Are Super! with 49 percent of the vote of the viewing audience. The 2019 season of the show was called a superseason and was to consist mostly of winners and finalists from previous seasons. As the 2018 winner, Diana Ankudinova was invited back, and she also won that 2019 superseason.

Immediately after the announcement of Diana's win of the 2018 season of You Are Super!, one of the jury members, Igor Krutoy, promised to give Diana an apartment in Moscow so that she could continue her musical studies in Moscow. Diana was given the keys to the new apartment on August 20, 2018, where she continues to live.

=== Performances on You Are Super! ===
2018

Broadcast date	Title	Performance	Language	Songwriters	Original Artist
February 10, 2018	"Dernière Danse"		French	Indila	Indila
April 14, 2018	"It's a Man's Man's Man's World"		English	James Brown and Betty Jean Newsome	James Brown
May 12, 2018	"Rechenka"		Russian	(Russian folk song)	
May 25, 2018 (Season finale)	"Tomorrow is a Lie"		English	Igor Krutoy and Lara Fabian	Lara Fabian

2019

Broadcast date	Title	Performance	Language	Songwriters	Original Artist
April 21, 2019	"Blizzard"		Russian	Fil Pisarev (Phil Ginzburg) (music), Egor Zakharov (lyrics)	Grigory Leps
May 12, 2019	"Wicked Game"		English	Chris Isaak	Chris Isaak
May 26, 2019 (Super-season finale)	"Human"		English	Rory Graham and Jamie Hartman	Rag'n'Bone Man

=== After You Are Super! ===
Before and after winning the 2018 season of You Are Super!, her biological mother and some other biological relatives wrote to Diana on social networks. Diana had no desire to communicate with any of them, though, since she already had a loving adoptive family who had happily raised her.

Diana Ankudinova took part in the 2018 New Wave Junior international contest for young pop music performers in Artek, where she won the Audience Award.

She has done a number of solo concerts in Russia, as well as performances in a few nearby countries such as Estonia, Kazakhstan and Tajikistan.

On October 18, 2019, Brad Cooney (US) posted a podcast interview with Diana Ankudinova. Diana gave another interview with a vocal сoach Emre Yücelen from Turkey, which was posted to YouTube on August 24, 2019.

On January 23, 2020, the presentation of the first single by Diana Ankudinova took place in Moscow in the bard club "Capercaillie's Nest". It included songs "As Your voice", "In your city", "How are you there" and "On the waves of fate".

On September 10, 2020, the official video for "Into the Sky" was released.

In September 2020, she was accepted as a student at the Russian Institute of Theatre Arts (GITIS).

On October 4, 2020, Diana acted as a guest star of the 4th season of the You Are Super! program with the song "Into the Sky".

On October 12, 2020, Diana's voice teacher Olga Donskaya died in Moscow. In late 2020, Diana's foster father died.

In December 2020, she decided to attempt to finance her first full CD music album though crowdfunding using the Russian crowdfunding web site Boomstarter. When the crowdfunding period expired in early 2021, Diana Ankudinova had reached 236% of her goal. The released album is entitled "D.A." after the initials of Diana Ankudinova. The album was released in early December 2021. It contains nine original songs.

=== 2021: ShowMaskGoOn (ШОУМАСКГООН) ===
Diana Ankudinova began taking part in ShowMaskGoOn on the NTV channel during its first weekly episode on September 25, 2021. This was a nine-episode weekly televised vocal contest among nine professionals, with the finale scheduled for November 20, 2021. That final show concluded with Diana Ankudinova being declared the overall winner of the series of nine programs.

ShowMaskGoOn was a competition among 9 professional singers associated with 3 major vocal competitions that had appeared on the Russian NTV network. The shows were You Are Super, Mask, and Superstar. The 9 participants acted as judges and commented and voted on the performances of each of the other participants. Each of the 9 songs were to be from a different specified song classification, except for one song which was the choice of the performer. Each episode also had a guest judge who could vote and comment on the participants performances, but the guest judge did not perform a song.

At the end of each episode, the participants and the guest judge had to rate the other participants on a scale of from 2 to 9 points. Participants could not vote on themselves. At the end of the final episode, Diana Ankudinova had accumulated 468 points, which was 25 points above the second-place finisher.

=== Performances on ShowMaskGoOn ===
Broadcast date	Title	Performance	Language	Songwriters	Original Artist
September 25, 2021	"Can't Help Falling in Love"		English	Hugo Peretti, Luigi Creatore, George David Weiss	Elvis Presley (1961)
October 2, 2021	"Mom, I'm Dancing"		Russian	Maria Zaitseva and Maria Sheikh	# 2Mashi (2018)
October 9, 2021	"Oh, it is not yet evening"		Russian	Russian Folk Song	
October 16, 2021	"Twist in My Sobriety"		English	Tanita Tikaram	Tanita Tikaram (1988)
October 23, 2021	"The Way"		Russian	Sergei Savvateev	Olga Kormukhina (2010)
October 30, 2021	"Help Me"		Russian	Aleksandr Zatsepin (music) and Leonid Derbenyov (lyrics) for the motion picture The Diamond Arm	Aida Vedishcheva (voiceover) in the motion picture The Diamond Arm (1969)
November 6, 2021	"Crow" (Vorona)		Russian	Maxim Fadeev	Linda (1996)
November 13, 2021	"The Little Prince"		Russian	Mikael Tariverdiev (music) and Nikolai Dobronravov (lyrics) for the motion picture Passenger from the "Equator"	Elena Kamburova (1968)
November 20, 2021 (Season finale)	"Personal Jesus"		English	Martin Gore	Depeche Mode (1989)

=== 2021: Д.А. ("D.A") Full-length Album ===
On March 26, 2021, the official video for "Happiness" was released.

Diana Ankudinova released her first full-length studio album, Д.А. ("D.A"), in December, 2021 to all digital platforms and also to her YouTube account. This was one year after crowdfunding for the album had begun. The album was produced by Brandon Stone (Russian: Брендон Стоун).

=== Tracks on Д.А. ("D.A") ===
Track	Title	Performance	Songwriters	Arranger
1	Счастье ("Happiness")		Maria Tarasenko, Brandon Stone	
2	Мой камин ("My Fireplace")		Brandon Stone, Maria Tarasenko	Nikita AuRino
3	На краю ("At the Edge")		Brandon Stone, Maria Tarasenko	Nikita AuRino
4	Ночь ("My Night")		Brandon Stone, Maria Tarasenko	Nikita AuRino
5	Ангел ("Angel")		Brandon Stone, Maria Tarasenko	Nikita AuRino
6	Хрупкий лёд ("Thin Ice")		Brandon Stone, Maria Tarasenko	Nikita AuRino
7	Я Россией тебя зову ("I Call You Russia")		Brandon Stone, Maria Tarasenko	Nikita AuRino
8	Дудук ("Duduk")		Brandon Stone, Maria Tarasenko	
9	Родная ("The Closest Soul")		Brandon Stone	

=== 2023: Маска (The Masked Singer) ===
Beginning on February 12, 2023, Diana Andkudinova appeared on the weekly television show Маска (The Masked Singer) on the Russian NTV channel. She sang under the Ermine mask. She was eliminated as a contestant on the April 9, 2023 show, and she removed her Ermine mask to reveal her true identity. She then performed a reprise of her song California Dreamin' from episode 6 of Маска (The Masked Singer) show.

Performances on Маска (The Masked Singer)
Broadcast date	Title	Language	Songwriters	Original Artist
February 12, 2023	"Bloody Mary"	English	Lady Gaga, Fernando Garibay and DJ White Shadow	Lady Gaga
February 19, 2023	"Скажи, не молчи" (Say, Do Not Be Silent)	Russian	Maxim Fadeev	Serebro
February 26, 2023	"Всё в твоих руках" (All in Your Hands)	Russian		Anzhelika Varum and Leonid Agutin (1999)
March 5, 2023	"Шагай" (Stride) and Gangnam Style	Russian	Konstantin Meladze (Шагай)	Polina Gagarina (Шагай) (2014) and Psy (Gangnam Style)
March 12, 2023	"Ты мой Бог" (You are my God)	Russian		Irina Ponarovskaya (1992)
March 19, 2023	"California Dreamin'"	English	John Phillips and Michelle Phillips	The Mamas & the Papas (1965)
March 26, 2023	"Я тебя отвоюю" (I Will Win You Back)	Russian	Igor Krutoy (music) and Marina Tsvetaeva (lyrics)	Irina Allegrova (1994)
April 2, 2023	"Sweet Dreams (Are Made of This)"	English	Annie Lennox and David A. Stewart	Eurythmics (1983)
April 9, 2023	"Улетай на крыльях ветра" (Fly on the Wings of the Wind)	Russian	Alexander Borodin	(From the opera Prince Igor)

== Vocal range and style ==
When Ankudinova first came to broader attention in 2017, her range was measured as D_{3} to A_{5}. As of September 2021, her functional range was measured as C_{3} to B♭_{5}. With her tessitura, it identifies her potential voice type as dramatic contralto, the deepest, darkest, and most powerful contralto voice. As of August 2023 her upper range reached D_{6} in the song "The Day You..."

As of December 2024 after her cover performance of Yma Sumac's "Taki Rari" in the "Avatar" show her range have been confirmed to expand a full octave above, reaching notes such as G♯_{6} and A_{6}, there are also videos from live streams where she is reaching as high as a B_{7}, this alone shows the expansion of her already astonishing range into incredible heights well within the whistle register.

Her overall range now at the age of 23 covers about 5 octaves.

== Notes and references ==
Additional reference information:

- Some of the information for the 2018–2019 You Are Super! section, including the rules of the competition, derives directly (although mostly paraphrased) from the Russian-language Wikipedia article on the Ты супер! television program.
- Notes about the names of songwriters: It is not uncommon for singer/songwriters to use a stage name as a singer and their original legal name as a songwriter. For songwriters mentioned in this article, Indila writes songs under her birth name of Adila Sedraïa. Lara Fabian is often credited as a songwriter as Lara Sophie Katy Crokaert. As a songwriter, Rag'n'Bone Man is Rory Charles Graham. (These names can be confirmed in the appropriate linked article in the English-language Wikipedia.)
- In her videos of the song "V'yuga" (Blizzard), Diana Ankudinova credits F. Pisarev (Fil Pisarev) with composing the music. (The composer's mother's name is Kira Pisareva and his father's name is Boris Ginzburg. "V'yuga" was his first major songwriting success.) Today, he is more widely-known in Russia both as a musician and composer under the name Fil Ginzburg (or Phil Ginzburg). See the Russian-language Wikipedia article for Фил Гинзбург. That article gives his real full name as "Philip Borisovich Ginzburg (Pisarev)."
