= Junior MasterChef Greece =

- Genre: Cooking
- Directed by: Panos Georgiou (1); Costas Tripylas (2)
- Presented by: Maria Mpekatorou
- Judges: Lefteris Lazarou; Yiannis Loukakos; Dimitris Skarmoutsos; Eleni Psyhouli; Manolis Papoutsakis; Magky Tabakaki
- Countries of origin: Greece; Cyprus
- Original language: Greek
- No. of seasons: 2
- No. of episodes: 46

Production
- Running time: 60 minutes (including commercials)
- Production companies: Season 1: Studio ATA; Season 2: EndemolShine Group

Original release
- Network: Mega Channel (1); Star Channel (2)
- Release: 30 November 2011 – 24 December 2018

Junior MasterChef Greece is a Greek competitive cooking game show. It is an adaptation of the Australian show Junior MasterChef Australia. It is a spin-off of MasterChef Greece, itself an adaptation of the British show MasterChef, and features contestants aged 8 to 12 in season 1 and in season 2 features contestants aged 8 to 13. The show began airing on 30 November 2011 on Mega Channel. On 13 September 2018 began airing the second season on Star Channel.

== Hosts and judges ==
Timeline of hosts and judges
Starring	Seasons	
Starring	1	2
Dimitris Skarmoutsos	Judge	
Lefteris Lazarou	Judge	
Yiannis Loukakos	Judge	
Maria Mpekatorou	Host	
Eleni Psyhouli		Host & Judge
Manolis Papoutsakis		Host & Judge
Magky Tabakaki		Host & Judge

== Series overview ==
Season	Number of contestants	Number of episodes	Originally aired			Classification of first trinity		
Season	Number of contestants	Number of episodes	First aired	Last aired	Network	Winner	Runner-up	Third place
1	12	20	30 November 2011	5 February 2012	Mega Channel	Lilian Emvaloti	Margarita Marmara	Elsa Kletsa-Kalimpasieri
2	22	26	13 September 2018	24 December 2018	Star Channel	Konstantinos Christopoulos	Popi Anevlavi	Katia Ritzaki

== Series synopsis ==
=== Season 1 (2011-2012) ===
The first season of the show began production in June 2011. Over 12,000 children from around the nation auditioned for the series. The show premiered on 30 November 2011 and finished airing on 5 February 2012. It was hosted by Maria Mpekatorou. The judges were Yiannis Loukakos, Lefteris Lazarou and Dimitris Skarmoutsos. The winner was twelve-year-old Lilian Emvaloti.

==== Contestants ====
The top 12 contestants were chosen throughout the first week of challenges amongst the Top 40 and the Top 20. The full group of 12 were all revealed on Wednesday, 7 December 2011.

Place	Contestant	Age	Hometown	Status
1st	Lilian Emvaloti	12	Nea Smyrni	Winner 5 February
2nd	Margarita Marmara	12	Athens	Runner-up 5 February
3rd	Elsa Kletsa-Kalimpasieri	13	Heraklion	Finalists 2 February
4th	Stefania Douvi	11	Athens	Finalists 2 February
5th	Dimitris Karpetis	12	Chania	Eliminated 27 January
6th	Agamemnon Kyriazis	10	Athens	Eliminated 27 January
7th	Giorgos Athanasopoulos	12	Thessaloniki	Eliminated 13 January
8th	Spyros Petropoulos	11	Piraeus	Eliminated 13 January
9th	Arxontia Vamvakari	11	Petroupoli	Eliminated 29 December
10th	Stelios Kaimakis	13	Piraeus	Eliminated 29 December
11th	Alena Saracine	11	Athens	Eliminated 15 December
12th	Matina Roumpou	12	Nea Ionia	Eliminated 15 December

==== Elimination table ====
Place	Contestants	Episode																
Place	Contestants	1			2			3			4			5			6	
Place	Contestants	IT	OT	ET	IT	OT	ET	IT	OT	ET	IT	OT	ET	IT	OT	ET	IT	FD
1	Lilian	MP	WT	IM	HP	LT	WC	BP	BP	HP	BP	HP	WC	MP	MP	WC	WC	WINNER
2	Margarita	WC	IM		MP	WT	IM	MP	WC	IM	MP	MP	HP	MP	WC	IM	HP	2º PLACE
3	Elsa	BP	LT	TWP	WC	IM		HP	BP	SWP	WC	IM		MP	MP	EL		
4	Stefania	HP	LT	WC	HP	WT	IM	MP	MP	TWP	MP	WC	IM	MP	HP	EL		
5-6	Dimitris	MD	LT	SWP	BP	LT	SWP	HP	MP	WC	HP	BP	EL					
5-6	Agamemnon	WC	IM		HP	WT	IM	WC	IN		DC		EL					
7-8	Giorgis	HP	WT	IM	BP	WT	IM	MP	HP	EL								
7-8	Spyros	MP	WT	IM	MP	WT	IM	BP	HP	EL								
9-10	Arxontia	MP	WT	IM	MP	LT	EL											
9-10	Stelios	MP	WT	IM	BP	LT	EL											
11-12	Alena	BP	LT	EL														
11-12	Matina	MP	LT	EL														

(IT) Initial test, (OT) Outdoor test, (ET) Elimination test, (FD) Final duel

The contestant is winner
The contestant is finalist
Winner of challenge
High performance
Medium performance
Bad performance
Immunity
(WT) Red is winner team (LT) Red is loser team
(WT) Blue is winner team (LT) Blue is loser team
Third worst performance
Second worst performance
Eliminated
Don't compete in the challenge
Don't compete

=== Season 2 (2018) ===
The second season premiered on 13 September 2018 and finished airing on 24 December 2018 on Star Channel. Over 1,500 children from around the nation auditioned for the second series. The judges were Eleni Psyhouli, Manolis Papoutsakis and Magky Tabakaki. The winner was twelve-year-old Konstantinos Christopoulos.

==== Contestants ====
The group of 22 children (11 boys and 11 girls) was revealed in the weekend of Thursday-Friday 20–21 September 2018. The selection was made from 44 children who went through auditions (22 boys and 22 girls).

Place	Contestant	Age	Hometown	Status
1st	Konstantinos Christopoulos	12	Agia Varvara, Athens	Winner 24 December
2nd	Popi Anevlavi	12	Apeiranthos, Naxos	Runner-up 24 December
3rd	Katia Ritzaki	9	Irakleio, Athens	Third Place 24 December
4th	Christos Soures da Silva	11	Corfu	Eliminated 21 December
5th	Konstantinos Spanidis	12	Athens	Eliminated 21 December
6th	Angelina Stampopoulou	11	Thessaloniki	Eliminated 21 December
7th	Manolis Foutoulis	13	Charaki, Rhodes	Eliminated 14 December
8th	Kleopatra Koutantou	8	Athens	Eliminated 14 December
9th	Miltiadis Siafakas	13	Piraeus	Eliminated 7 December
10th	Melpomeni Stellaki	12	Athens	Eliminated 7 December
11th	Michaela Pagouni	10	Argyroupoli, Athens	Eliminated 15 November
12th	Tonia-Maria Zonia	10	Larnaca, Cyprus	Eliminated 15 November; Returned 2 November; Eliminated 1 November
13th	Marios Ydreos	11	Agia Paraskevi, Athens	Eliminated 8 November
14th	Marios Liontos	12	Ioannina	Eliminated 8 November; Returned 2 November; Eliminated 5 October
15th	Kiki Plakida	13	Skydra, Pella	Eliminated 1 November
16th	Thaleia Tsakalou	12	Athens	Eliminated 19 October
17th	Eirini Mavrigiannaki	10	Athens	Eliminated 19 October
18th	Konstantinos Terpezidis	8	Serres	Eliminated 12 October
19th	Ariadni Perivolidi	11	Athens	Eliminated 12 October
20th	Konstantinos Giovanidis	11	Kallithea, Athens	Eliminated 5 October
21st	Angelos Christodoulou	13	Xylokastro, Corinthia	Eliminated 28 September
22nd	Giannis Kontaxakis	9	Kallithea, Athens	Eliminated 28 September

==== Notes ====
- Marios Liontos, eliminated on 5 October with Konstantinos Giovanidis, but he got a second chance on 2 November.
- Tonia-Maria Zonia, eliminated on 1 November with Kiki Plakida, but she got a second chance on 2 November.
