= AleAda =

Studio album by Linda
- Released: (Russia) October 6, 2006 (Greece) 2007
- Recorded: 2005–2006 in Cyprus, Russia and London, United Kingdom
- Genre: Indie pop
- Length: 43:46
- Label: Universal Music Russia
- Producer: Stefanos Korkolis

Linda chronology
Pochti bliznetsy (2005)	AleAda (2006)	Skor-Piony (2008)

AleAda (Russian: АлеАда) is Linda's sixth studio album (fifteenth overall), released in Russia on October 16, 2006. AleAda was recorded in Cyprus along with Greek producer Stefanos Korkolis. The title, AleAda, was an amalgamation of Linda's mother's name, Alexandra, and Korkolis' mother's name, Ada.

Of the album, Linda said:

“AleAda is a word from Stefanos Korkolis' and my language. The album deals with people very close to us. Analogous to the name is the word "infinity" - the cardiogram of heart, which is always beating and always bears its message for each person. "AleAda" can be considered the catalyst that one aspires to achieve internal harmony within; one who knows what warmth, love, and a mother is.”

The first single from AleAda was released in March 2006, and unveiled as "Ya ukradu". This song became the biggest radio single since "Begi" from AtakA.

== Formats ==
- Russian Standard Release. The initial release of AleAda including two additional remix tracks.
- Russian Limited Edition. A re-issue of the album repackaged in a slipcase and Digipak including a separate DVD containing three music videos and a photo gallery.
- Greek Release. A re-issue of the album for the Greek audience including revised song titles, Greek and English translations within the booklet, and three additional tracks performed with popular Greek band Goin' Through.

== Track listing ==
The cover of the Greek edition of AleAda.

All lyrics are written by Linda

No.	Title	Music	Length
1.	"Lyubov v konverte" (Любовь в конверте, lit. Love in Envelope)	Linda	3:51
2.	"Mechena ya" (Мечена я, lit. Engraved in the Heart)	Linda	3:55
3.	"Ya ukradu" (Я украду, lit. I'll Steal Away)	Linda	3:04
4.	"Tolkay na lyubov!" (Толкай на любовь!, lit. Push to Love!)	Linda	3:27
5.	"Rokovaya lyubov" (Роковая любовь, lit. Fatal Love)	Linda	3:49
6.	"Ya i Geysha" (Я и Гейша, lit. Me & Geisha)	Stefanos Korkolis, Linda	3:33
7.	"Po relsam lyubvi" (По рельсам любви, lit. On the Rails of Love)	Korkolis, Linda	4:00
8.	"Ya vletela v tebya" (Я влетела в тебя, lit. I Flew Into You)	Korkolis, Linda	3:58
9.	"Belyj shtorm" (Белый шторм, lit. The White Storm)	Linda	3:43
10.	"AleAda" (АлеАда)	Korkolis, Linda	3:43

Russian edition additional tracks
No.	Title	Writer(s)	Length
11.	"Ya ukradu" (Radio Version)	Linda	3:03
12.	"Tolkay na lyubov! (Remix)"	Linda	4:01

Greek edition additional tracks
No.	Title	Lyrics	Music	Length
11.	"To Simadi" (Το Σημάδι, Mechena ya Greek version; duet with Goin' Through)	Linda, NiVo	Linda	4:18
12.	"Kanenas Pote" (Κανένας Ποτέ, Po relsam lyubvi Greek version)	Thanos Nikolau, Linda	Korkolis, Linda	4:04
13.	"The Mark" (Mechena ya English version; duet with Goin' Through)	Linda, Dope MC	Linda	4:19

== Singles ==
#	Title	Date
1.	"Ya ukradu!"	March 2006
2.	"Tolkay na lyubov!"	2006
3.	"Mechena ya"	2006
4.	"Lyobov v konverte"	2007
5.	"Kanenas Pote"	2008
6.	"To Simadi"	2008
