= Skor-Piony =

Studio album by Linda
- Released: (Russia) March 28, 2008
- Recorded: 2007–8 in Cyprus & Moscow
- Genre: Alternative rock
- Length: 43:31
- Label: Universal Music Russia
- Producer: Stefanos Korkolis

Linda chronology
AleAda (2006)	Skor-Piony (2008)	Linda. Luchshiye pesni (2010)

Skor-Piony (Russian: Sкор-Пионы;Scorpions or Scor-Peonies) is Linda's seventh studio album (sixteenth overall), released in Russia on March 28, 2008. Skor-Piony was the second album to be recorded with legendary Greek producer Stefanos Korkolis. The album presents an overall harder and more varied sound than the previous AleAda.

The title, Skor-Piony, is a word play in Russian that translates to "Scor-Peonies", a blend of scorpion and peonies. The first letter has been interchanged with the Latin S instead of the Cyrillic С, hence the true Russian spelling being 'Скор-Пионы'. Without the hyphen, the title spells out 'scorpions'. Meanwhile, "пионы" (Piony) translates to 'peonies'. Although some meaning will be lost through translation, the Russian title in its entirety can be interpreted as "peonies like dangerous scorpions". Linda explained that she came up with this play on words to show the danger in beauty, and also the beauty in danger:

“I like contrasting between two complete opposites; (the idea that) something of which can be dangerous, but beautiful at the same time. It turns out that we are all connected to the danger of beauty. Such a union is present in people's lives. Beauty and love always go side-by-side with danger: apparently someone or something can be beautiful, but dangerous inside. And vice versa.”

The first radio single from the album was "Chyorno-snezhnaya" released in February 2008. However, with only 70 plays, the single did not chart well, peaking at #184 on the Airplay Detection TopHit100 charts. The second single was "Skor-Piony" and the first single of the album to have a promotional video. The video debuted on the official Linda website in mid-March 2008 and was filmed by famed Greek directors who has done music videos for U2.

== Formats ==
- Standard Release. The normal release of Skor-Piony housed in a jewel case including two additional remix tracks.
- Limited Edition. Limited edition packaged in a slipcase and four-panel digipak including a separate DVD containing "Skor-Piony" music video and a photo gallery of two photo sessions.

== Track listing ==
All lyrics are written by Linda

No.	Title	Music	Length
1.	"Skor-Piony" (Sкор-Пионы, lit. Scor-Peonies)	Linda	3:32
2.	"Pyat minut" (Пять минут, lit. Five Minutes)	Linda, Stefanos Korkolis	3:39
3.	"Okhota na..." (Охота на..., lit. Hunting for...)	Linda	3:27
4.	"Melankholiya" (Меланхолия, lit. Melancholy)	Linda	4:04
5.	"Posledniy raz geroi" (Последний раз герои, lit. Heroes For Last Time)	Linda, Korkolis	3:09
6.	"N. L. Z. (Nezhny, laskovy zver)" (Нежный, ласковый зверь, lit. Gentle, Tender Beast)	Linda	4:12
7.	"Kolybel" (Колыбель, lit. Cradle)	Korkolis	3:50
8.	"Krov" (Кровь, lit. Blood)	Linda	3:52
9.	"Zamedlennaya bomba" (Замедленная бомба, lit. Slow-Motioned Bomb)	Linda	3:29
10.	"Chyorno-snezhnaya" (Чёрно-снежная, lit. The Black-and-Snow)	Linda	3:28
11.	"Okhota na..." (fight club remix)	Linda	3:24
12.	"Skor-Piano..." (Sкор-Пиано..., lit. Scor-Piano... (remix))	Linda	3:25

== Singles ==
#	Title	Date
1.	"Chyorno-snezhnaya"	February 2008
2.	"Skor-Piony"	March 2008
3.	"Pyat minut"	June 2008
