= Akis Petretzikis =

Greek celebrity chef (born 1984)

- Born: Georgios Evlampios Petretzikis; March 4, 1984 (age 42); Thessaloniki, Greece
- Education: Accounting and Finance, TEI of Athens; Le Monde Culinary School
- Culinary career
- Cooking style: Greek cuisine; Mediterranean cuisine; International cuisine
- Current restaurants: Kitchen Lab Café Bistro; Burger AP
- Website: akispetretzikis.com/en

Georgios Evlampios (Akis) Petretzikis (born 4 March 1984) is a Greek celebrity chef. He is the CEO of Akis Petretzikis Ltd, which publishes cooking magazines and books, produces cooking shows, runs restaurants, and has an e-shop with various kitchen products designed by himself.

Born and raised in Thessaloniki, he started working in his family's business at the age of 16 and moved to Athens at 18 to study accounting and finance while also attending culinary school. He worked in the UK for five years before returning to Greece to compete in and win the first season of the Greek version of The Master Chef TV show. He has since hosted multiple cooking shows, including his own web series, Kitchen Lab and Akis’ Kitchen, and has collaborated with Fresh One Productions for Jamie Oliver's Food YouTube channel.

== Television ==
After Petretzikis appeared on MEGA Channel's morning show To proino mou (My Μοrning) from 2010 to 2014. From 2014 to 2016, he hosted his own daily show Kan’ to opos o Akis (Do it like Akis). He also worked on the show Ready Steady Cook UK.

== Books ==
In 2017, Petretzikis published his book Piece of Cake. During the same year, he published a new cooking magazine through Attikes Publishing House.

== Filmography ==
=== Television ===
Year	Title	Role(s)	Notes
2010	MasterChef Greece	Himself (contestant)	Season 1; Winner
2010-2014	My Breakfast	Himself (chef)	Morning talk show on MEGA
2014-2015	Stories from the list	Himself (host)	Travel documentary show; also creator
2014-2016	Bend It Like Akis	Himself (host)	Daytime cooking show on MEGA
2016-2017	A suitcase full of tastes	Himself (host)	Daytime cooking show; season 2
2017	Ready Steady Cook Greece	Himself (host)	Cooking game show; season 3
2017-present	Kitchen Lab with Akis Petretzikis	Himself (host)	Weekend cooking show; also creator
2018-2019	Bake Off Greece	Himself (judge)	Season 1
2020-2021	Ready Steady Cook	Himself (co-host)	Cooking game show
2020-present	Akis' Food Tour	Himself (host)	Travel documentary show; also creator
