= Kostas Bigalis =

Greek composer and singer

Kostas (or Costas) Bigalis (Greek: Κώστας Μπίγαλης, born 15 March 1953 in Athens) is a Greek composer and singer. In 1994, Bigalis and The Sea Lovers represented Greece in the Eurovision Song Contest 1994.

== Biography ==
He began his artistic career at the age of 19 when he was won a music competition and signed his first contract with EMI Greece.

In 1978, he was cast in the contemporary opera "Utopia", by Mimis Plessas and Kostas Virvos, and in 1979, he starred in the Greek version of the rock opera "Jesus Christ Superstar," in the lead role of high priest Annas. In the same year, Bigalis attended the Drama School of Athens.

In the summer of 1980, he starred in the role of Hermes in the musical adaptation of "Lucian Dialogues", which was performed at the Athens Festival at the Lycabettus Theater. In the same year, he was cast in a small part in Universal's TV film "Acts of the Apostles Peter and Paul", starring Anthony Hopkins.

In 1981, he recorded with producer Loukas Sideras, member of the legendary Greek band Aphrodite's Child, two songs, “Seventh Heaven” and “The Amazing Mr. Be," for the American film, "The Next One," by Nikos Mastorakis.

In 1984, Bigalis's song, “I MISS YOU," was the number-one single of the year in Greece for 1984-85 and was released in eighteen countries.

In 1994, Bigalis and The Sea Lovers represented Greece in the Eurovision Song Contest 1994 with his song, "To trehantiri", finishing in 14th place with 44 points.

In 2026, Bigalis appeared on MasterChef Greece to support his nephew, Marios, who is competing.

== Discography ==
Year	Title	Certification
1984	Big Alice	
1989	Me Ton Ilio Stous Ichtheis [With the Sun in Pisces]	Gold
1992	Tou Aigaiou Ta Blues [Aegean Blues]	Platinum
1993	Mikri Mou Melissa [My little Bee]	Platinum
1994	Mousiko Taxidi [Musical Journey]	Gold
1995	Ilie Mou, File Mou [My Sun, My Friend]	-
1996	O Erotas Sou Thalassa [Your Love like Sea]	-
1997	Mithos [Myth]	-
1998	Pathos [Passion]	-
1999	Mia stigmi sto Chrono [A Moment In Time]	-
2002	Me tin plati ston toiho [With my back against the Wall]	-
2005	Galazio [Light blue]	-
2011	Zise [Live]	

Preceded by Katy Garbi with Ellada, chora tou fotos	Greece in the Eurovision Song Contest; 1994	Succeeded by Elina Konstantopoulou with Pia prosefhi
