= Bake Off Greece =

Baking competition

- Genre: Baking; Reality
- Based on: The Great British Bake Off
- Directed by: Alekos Kiranis
- Presented by: Ioanna Triantafyllidou
- Judges: Akis Petretzikis; Nikolas Straggas; Dimitris Xronopoulos
- Country of origin: Greece
- Original language: Greek
- No. of series: 1
- No. of episodes: 28

Production
- Executive producer: Marilena Simadira
- Producer: Kostas Sousoulas
- Production locations: Varympompi, Attica, Greece
- Running time: 90 minutes
- Production company: Love Productions

Original release
- Network: Alpha TV
- Release: 23 September 2018 – 24 March 2019

Bake Off Greece (also called Bake Off) is a Greek television baking competition, produced by Love Productions, in which a group of amateur bakers compete against each other in a series of rounds, attempting to impress a group of judges with their baking skills, with a contestant being eliminated in each round, with the winner being selected from the contestants who reach the finals. The show's first episode was aired on 23 September 2018. The Show based on the BBC baking competition The Great British Bake Off.

The programme is presenting by Ioanna Triantafyllidou, with judges Akis Petretzikis, Nikolas Straggas and Dimitris Xronopoulos.

== Host and judges ==
Key
Host
Judge

Cast member	Seasons
Cast member	1
Ioanna Triantafyllidou	
Akis Petretzikis	
Nikolas Straggas	
Dimitris Xronopoulos	

== Series overview ==
Series	Episodes	Premiere	Finale	Winner	Runner-up	Timeslot	Channel
1	28	23 September 2018	24 March 2019	Venia Flessa	Lena Samerka	Sunday 21:00pm (Episodes 1-24); Sunday 20:00pm (Episodes 25–28)	Alpha TV

- In series 1 the episodes 19, 21 and 23 were broadcast on Fridays at 21:00pm.

== Season 1: 2018 ==
Series 1 of Bake Off Greece saw eighteen home bakers take part in a bake-off to test their baking skills as they battled to be crowned the Bake Off Greece best amateur baker. It began airing on 23 September 2018 on Alpha TV.

The winner is Venia Flessa.

=== Bakers ===
Baker	Hometown	Status
Venia Flessa	Kalamata	Winner (Episode 28)
Lena Samerka	Athens	Runner-up (Episode 28)
Anna-Maria Kefala	Cyprus	Eliminated (Episode 27)
Georgia Mimigianni	Agios Dimitrios	Eliminated (Episode 26)
Nikos Zotos	Athens	Eliminated (Episode 24)
Dora Georgiou	Livadeia	Eliminated (Episode 22)
Meli Karamelidou	Thessaloniki	Eliminated (Episode 18)
Panos Zaredis	Vari	Eliminated (Episode 16)
Orestis Feizo	Piraeus	Eliminated (Episode 13)
Alexandra Legga	Agia Varvara	Eliminated (Episode 12)
Mihalis Spiridakis	Dafni	Eliminated (Episode 11)
Petros Fouskitakis	Chania	Eliminated (Episode 8)
Katerina Kirpi	Athens	Eliminated (Episode 7)
Eya Seimenaki	Athens	Eliminated (Episode 6)
Panagiotis Barberis	Keratsini	Eliminated (Episode 5)
Dora Kappi	Athens	Eliminated (Episode 4)
Akis Adamopoulos	Vounargo	Eliminated (Episode 3)
Jason Oikonomidis	Chalandri	Eliminated (Episode 2)
Christina Alipradi	Trikala	Eliminated (Episode 1)

== Results summary ==
Elimination chart
Baker	1	2	3	4	5	6	7	8	9	10	11	12	13	14	16	18	20	22	24	26	27	28
Venia			SB								SB								SB			Winner
Lena						SB								SB								Runner-up
Anna-Maria																SB					OUT	
Georgia															SB					OUT		
Nikos																		SB	OUT			
Dora G.				SB				SB										OUT				
Meli					SB								SB			OUT						
Panos									OUT	RET					OUT							
Orestis										ARR			OUT									
Alexandra												OUT										
Mihalis											OUT											
Petros	SB							OUT														
Katerina							OUT															
Eya						OUT																
Panagiotis					OUT																	
Dora K.		SB		OUT																		
Akis			OUT																			
Jason		OUT																				
Christina	OUT																					

Colour key:

Baker was one of the judges' least favourite bakers that week, but was not eliminated.
Baker was one of the judges' favourite bakers that week, but was not the Star Baker.
Baker got through to the next round.
Baker was eliminated.
Baker was the Star Baker.
Baker was Returned or Arrived
Baker was a series runner-up.
Baker was the series winner.

== Episodes ==
=== Team Phase ===
==== Episode 1: Premiere ====
Contestant	Technical challenge (Chocolate marquise)	Creative challenge (6 mini pies)	Outcome
Orestis & Alexandra	1º	Champagne and Strawberry	Advance
Venia & Anna Maria	2º	Lemon and orange	Advance
Panagiotis & Eya	3º	Champagne and raspberry	Advance
Dora G. & Georgia	4º	Chocolate and cream	Advance
Mihalis & Panos	5º	Vanilla and blueberries	Starbakers
Katerina & Petros	6º	Chocolate and grapes	Nominated
Lena & Nikos	7º	Chocolate and red wine	Nominated
Akis & Dora K.	8º	Strawberries and meringue	Advance
Christina & Jason	9º	Cream and vanilla	Eliminated

==== Episode 2: Chocolate ====
Contestant	Technical challenge (Chocolate souffle)	Creative challenge (24 kisses)	Outcome
Dora G. & Georgia	1º	Cream and orange	Advance
Panagiotis & Eya	2º	Chocolate and cookies	Advance
Anna Maria & Venia	3º	Chocolate and strawberries	Starbakers
Mihalis & Panos	4º	Strawberries and raspberries	Advance
Nikos & Lena	5º	Coffee liqueur	Nominated
Akis & Dora K.	6º	Blueberries and bitter chocolate	Eliminated
Orestis & Alexandra	7º	Grapefruit	Advance
Katerina & Petros	8º	Chocolate and orange	Nominated

==== Episode 3: Greek pastry ====
Contestant	Technical challenge (Baklava)	Creative challenge (Filled koulorakia)	Outcome
Katerina & Petros	1º	Almonds and chocolate	Starbakers
Orestis & Alexandra	2º	Watermelon and melon	Advance
Mihalis & Panos	3º	Caramel sauce	Nominated
Anna Maria & Venia	4º	Caramelized almonds	Advance
Dora & Georgia	5º	Chocolate and strawberries	Advance
Nikos & Lena	6º	Nuts and raisins	Nominated
Panagiotis & Eya	7º	Peanut butter	Eliminated

==== Episode 4: Tiny episode ====
- This was the last episode in the Team Phase.

Contestant	Technical challenge (6 mini waffles)	Creative challenge (48 petit fours)	Outcome
Anna Maria & Venia	1º	Red velvet / Blue velvet	Advance
Orestis & Alexandra	2º	Cookie cake / Lemon pie	Nominated
Katerina & Petros	3º	Apple pie / Chocolate financieros	Eliminated
Dora & Georgia	4º	Orange financieros / Cheesecake	Starbakers
Nikos & Lena	5º	Lemon pie / Cheesecake	Advance
Mihalis & Panos	6º	Chocolate cake / Pavlova	Nominated

=== Individual Phase ===
==== Episode 5: Snacks ====
Contestant	Technical challenge (20 brigadeiros)	Creative challenge (24 flavoured shuku-shuku)	Outcome
Dora	1º	Strawberry	Starbaker
Panos	2º	Chocolate and coconut	Advance
Georgia	3º	Coconut and banana	Advance
Lena	4º	Chocolate	Advance
Orestis	5º	Coffee liqueur	Advance
Alexandra	6º	Milk and apple	Nominated
Venia	7º	Coffee and coconut	Advance
Nikos	8º	Bitter chocolate	Nominated
Mihalis	9º	Chocolate and vanilla	Eliminated
Anna Maria	10º	Milk chocolate	Advance

==== Episode 6: Salty and sweet ====
Contestant	Technical challenge (6 cakepops)	Creative challenge (Bread basket)	Outcome
Nikos	1º	Reggiano cheese and grilled sausage	Advance
Georgia	2º	Bacon and brie cheese	Starbaker
Panos	3º	Onion and cheese	Advance
Anna-Maria	4º	Leek and cherry tomatoes	Advance
Orestis	5º	Raw ham and bacon pork rinds	Nominated
Alexandra	6º	Cherry tomatoes	Eliminated
Lena	7º	Bacon pork rinds	Advance
Dora	8º	Onion and cheese	Advance
Venia	9º	Grilled sausage and reggiano cheese	Nominated

==== Episode 7: Français pastry ====
Contestant	Technical challenge (Opera cake)	Creative challenge (Eclairs tower)	Outcome
Anna-Maria	1º	Custard cream and chocolate	Advance
Venia	2º	Bitter chocolate	Starbaker
Panos	3º	Milk and cream cheese	Advance
Dora	4º	Strawberry and blueberries	Nominated
Lena	5º	Chocolate and coffee liqueur	Nominated
Orestis	6º	Banana and apple	Eliminated
Georgia	7º	Coffee and bitter chocolate	Advance
Nikos	8º	Chocolate brownie	Advance

==== Episode 8: Desserts ====
Contestant	Technical challenge (Charlotte tiramisu)	Creative challenge (Triffle)	Outcome
Venia	1º	Chocolate and orange	Advance
Dora	2º	Lemon and hazelnut	Nominated
Lena	3º	Chocolate brownie	Starbaker
Panos	4º	Maracuja mousse	Eliminated
Anna-Maria	5º	Strawberry and pineapple	Advance
Georgia	6º	Custard cream and strawberry	Advance
Nikos	7º	Opera cake in a glass	Nominated

==== Episode 9: Judge ====
- In this episode both judge and presenter were tasked to decide the challenges.
- Technical challenge was decided by Nikolas and Akis.
- Creative challenge was decided by Ioanna and Dimitris.

Contestant	Technical challenge (Paris-Brest cake)	Creative challenge (Profiteroles construction)	Outcome
Lena	1º	Chocolate and mint	Nominated
Nikos	2º	Lemon and banana	Advance
Anna-Maria	3º	Chocolate and tomato jam	Starbaker
Dora	4º	Strawberry and raspberries	Eliminated
Venia	5º	Cappuccino and raspberries	Advance
Georgia	6º	Berries	Nominated

==== Episode 10: Countries ====
Contestant	Technical challenge (Colors cake)	Creative challenge (2 Flags cake)	Outcome
Venia	1º	Morocco and Turkey	Nominated
Georgia	2º	USA and Italy	Starbaker
Anna-Maria	3º	Cyprus and Israel	Advance
Lena	4º	Argentina and Mexico	Nominated
Nikos	5º	Brazil and Canada	Eliminated

==== Episode 11: Semifinal ====
Contestant	Technical challenge (Petit gateaux)	Creative challenge (My favourite artist)	Outcome
Lena	1º	Salvador Dalí	Finalist
Anna Maria	2º	Pablo Picasso	Finalist
Georgia	3º	Leonardo da Vinci	Eliminated
Venia	4º	Nikos Engonopoulos	Finalist

==== Episode 12: Final ====
Contestant	Technical challenge (Greek bake off cake)	Creative challenge (The grand finale cake)	Outcome
Lena	1º	Love	2nd finalist
Venia	2º	V.F.	Winner
Anna-Maria	3º	Cyprus flag	3rd finalist
