= I Zoi Ehei Hroma =

Single by Evridiki
- Released: 10 February 2008
- Genre: Techno, dance, rock, electropop
- Label: Virus Music
- Songwriters: Dimitris Korgialas, Thanos Papanikolaou

Evridiki singles chronology
"Comme Ci, Comme Ça" (2007)	"I Zoi Ehei Hroma" (2008)

"I Zoi Ehei Hroma" (Greek: Η ζωή έχει χρώμα; English: Life Has Color) is CD single recorded by Cypriot singer Evridiki. The single was released on 10 February 2008 by Virus Music in both Cyprus and Greece and is Evridiki's first release since her participation in the Eurovision Song Contest 2007. Music is by Dimitris Korgialas with lyrics by Thanos Papanikolaou.

The song was first heard at the National Selection for the Cypriot Entry in the Eurovision Song Contest 2008.

The song was written as part of a campaign of the Greek Ministry of Health to show what to do when confronted with the problems of smoking, narcotics, alcoholism, and lack of exercise.

== Track listing ==
1. "I Zoi Ehei Hroma"
2. "I Zoi Ehei Hroma" (Korgialas Remix)

== Charts ==
The song entered the Greek Top 50 Singles chart in the week of April 28, 2008 peaking at number two, and remaining on the chart for three weeks.
