= Linda (singer) =

Russian singer)

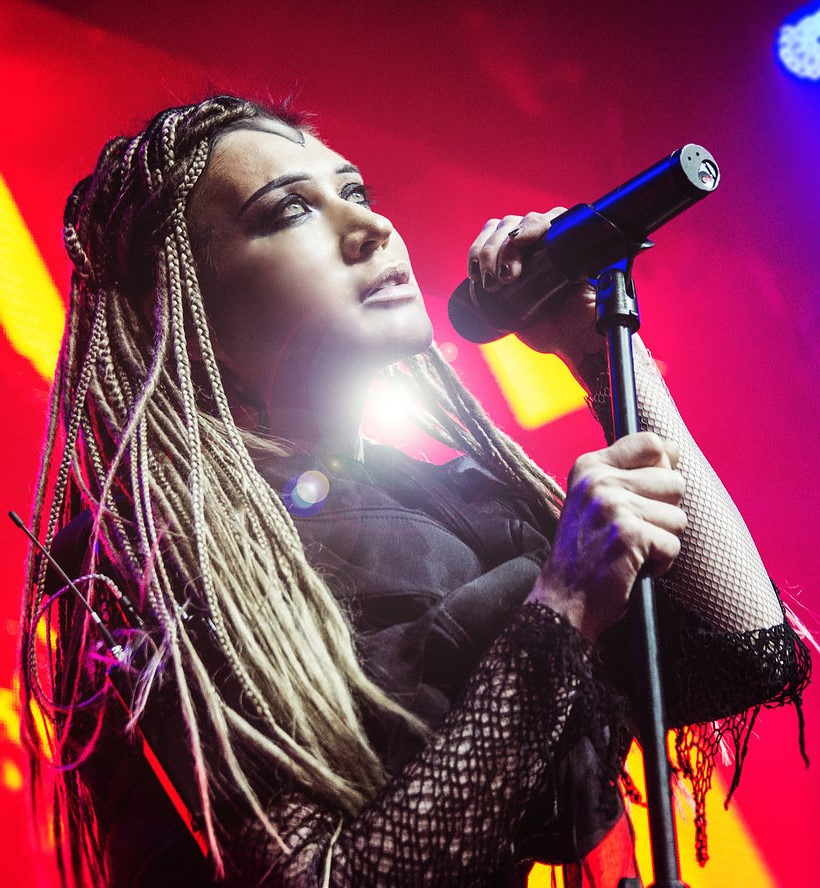
- At a concert at the Red Club in 2018

Background information
- Born: Svetlana Lvovna Geiman; 29 April 1973 (age 53); Kentau, Chimkent Region, Kazakh SSR, Soviet Union
- Genres: Pop-folk; trip hop; new age; alternative rock; trip rock; gothic rock
- Occupations: Singer; songwriter
- Instrument: Vocals
- Years active: 1993–present
- Labels: C.M.P.; J.S.P.; Real Records; BMG Russia; Universal Russia

Svetlana Lvovna Geiman (Russian: Светлана Львовна Гейман; born 29 April 1973), known professionally as Linda (Russian: Линда), is a Russian singer and songwriter. Her style incorporates trip hop, electronic, and ethnic music.

== Biography ==
Svetlana Geiman was born in Kazakh SSR. Her father is Lev Isaakovich, and mother was Alexandra Vasilyevna (1944—2005). She has an elder sister, Elena.

She studied at Gnessin State Musical College.

== Personal life ==
From 2005 to 2014 she dated Greek composer Stefanos Korkolis.

== Awards and nominations ==
Award	Year	Nominee(s)	Category	Result	Ref.
Поколение	1993	"Игра с огнём"	Breakthrough of the Year	Won	
Поколение	1996	"Круг от руки"	Best Cinematography	Won	
Поколение	1996	"Круг от руки"	Best Costume Design	Won	
MTV Video Music Awards	1999	"Отпусти меня"	Viewer's Choice	Nominated	
ZD Awards	1995	Herself	Best Female	Nominated	
ZD Awards	1996	Herself	Best Female	Nominated	
ZD Awards	1997	Herself	Best Female	Won	
ZD Awards	1998	Herself	Best Female	Nominated	

== Discography ==
=== Studio albums ===
Year	Album
1994	Pesni Tibetskih Lam (Russian: Песни тибетских лам; Songs of Tibetan Lamas)
1996	Vorona (Russian: Ворона; Crow)
1999	Platsenta (Russian: Плацента; Placenta)
2001	Zrenie (Russian: Зрение; Sight)
2004	AtakA (Russian: АтакА; transcription of Japanese: アタカ)
2006	AleAda
2008	Skor-Piony (Russian: Скор-Пионы; Scorpions or Scor-Peonies)
2013	Lay, Sobaka! (Russian: Лай, @!; Bark, Dog!)
2015	Karandashi i Spichki (Russian: Карандаши и спички; Pencils and Matches)
2020	DNK Mira (Russian: ДНК мира; World DNA)

=== Remix albums ===
Year	Album
1994	Tantsi Tibetskih Lam (Russian: Танцы тибетских лам; Dances of Tibetan Lamas)
1997	Vorona. Remix. Remake (Russian: Ворона. Remix. Remake; Crow. Remix. Remake)
2000	Embrion Right (Russian: Эмбрион Right; Embryo Right)
2000	Embrion Wrong (Russian: Эмбрион Wrong; Embryo Wrong)

=== Compilation albums ===
Year	Album
1999	Beloe na Belom (Russian: Белое на белом; White on White)
2001	Linda (Russian: Линда)
2005	Pochti Bliznetsy (Russian: Почти близнецы; Almost Twins)
2010	Linda. Luchshie pesni (Russian: Линда. Лучшие песни; Linda. Best Songs)

=== Singles ===
Year	Title	Formats	Album
1993	"Igra s Ognyom" ("Play with Fire")	Airplay, music video	Non-album single
1994	"Malo Ognya" ("Not Enough Fire")	Airplay, music video	Pesni Tibetskih Lam
1994	"Tanets pod Vodoy" ("Dance under Water")	Airplay, music video	Pesni Tibetskih Lam
1994	"Sdelay Tak" ("Do That")	Airplay, music video	Pesni Tibetskih Lam
1995	"Devochki s Ostrymi Zubkami" ("Girls with Sharp Teeth")	Airplay, music video (2 versions)	Pesni Tibetskih Lam
1995	"Krug ot Riki" ("Free-hand Circle")	Airplay, music video	Vorona
1996	"Severniy Veter" ("The Northern Wind")	Airplay, music video	Vorona
1996	"Vorona" ("Crow")	Airplay, music video	Vorona
1996	"Marikhuana" ("Marijuana")	Airplay, music video	Vorona
1999	"I’m Crow" (promo single)	CD	Non-album single
1999	"Vzglyad Iznutri" ("A Look From the Inside")	Airplay, music video	Platsenta
1999	"Otpusti Menya" ("Let Me Go")	Airplay, music video	Platsenta
2000	"Iznanka Sveta" ("The Underside of Light")	Airplay, music video	Linda, Embrion Right, Embrion Wrong
2001	"Dve Ulitki" ("Two Snails")	Airplay	Zreniye
2001	"Shokolad i Sleza" ("Chocolate and a Tear")	Airplay, music video	Zreniye
2003	"Tsepi i Koltsa" ("Chains and Rings") (maxi single)	CD, cassette, airplay, music video (3 versions)	AtakA
2004	"Begi" ("Run")	Airplay, music video	AtakA
2004	"Agoniya" ("Agony")	Airplay, music video	AtakA
2004	"Tak Krichali Ptitsy" ("Birds Was Screaming It")	Music video (2 versions)	AtakA
2005	"Zvonok" ("Phone Call")	Airplay	Nechotny Voin (Bi-2 side project's album)
2005	"Tay!" ("Melt Away!")	Airplay, music video	Pochti Bliznetsy
2006	"Ya Ukradu!" ("I'll Steal You Away!")	Airplay, music video	AleAda
2006	"Tolkay na Lyubov" ("Push Me to Love")	Airplay, music video	AleAda
2006	"Mechena Ya" ("Marked")	Airplay, music video	AleAda
2007	"Lyubov v Konverte" ("Love in an Envelope")	Airplay, music video	AleAda
2007	"Kanenas Pote" ("Never Nobody")	Airplay, music video	AleAda
2008	"Chyorno-Snezhnaya" ("Snow-Black")	Airplay	Skor-Piony
2008	"Scor-Piony" ("Scorpions" or "Scor-Peonies")	Airplay, music video	Skor-Piony
2008	"Pyat Minut" ("Five Minutes")	Airplay, music video	Skor-Piony
2012	"Marikhuana" ("Marijuana") (feat. ST)	Music video	Puleneprobivaemy (ST's album)
2012	"Malo Ognya" ("Not Enough Fire") (feat. Fike & Jambazi)	Airplay, music video	Gde-to... (Fike & Jambazi's album)
2013	"Daleko" ("Far away") (feat. Nike Borzov)	Airplay, music video	Nechotny Voin 3 (Bi-2 side project's album)
2013	"Oni Tak" ("They Are So")	Digital download, airplay	Lay, @!
2013	"Lay, Sobaka!" ("Bark, Dog!")	Digital download, airplay, music video	Lay, @!
2013	"Paranoya" ("Paranoia")	Music video	Lay, @!
2014	"Poves Menya" ("Hang Me")	Airplay, music video	Lay, @!
2014	"Dobraya Pesnya" ("Kind Song") (feat. Gleb Samoylov)	Digital download, music video	Lay, @!
2015	"Idealnaya pogoda chtoby idti k chortu" ("Perfect weather to go to hell")	Digital download, airplay, music video	Karandashi i Spichki
2015	"Boleyut Vse" ("All People Are Sick")	Airplay, music video	Karandashi i Spichki
2016	"Khochu (Pop-Radio-Mix)" ("I Want (Pop-Radio-Mix)")	Digital download	Karandashi i Spichki
2016	"Kamera Pytok" ("Torture Chamber")	Digital download, airplay	Illuminator (Ilya Kormiltsev's tribute album of various artists)
2017	"Ospa" ("Smallpox")	Digital download, music video	Non-album singles
2017	"Novye Lyudi" ("New People") (feat. Coma Soul)	Airplay	Non-album singles
2017	"Psikhi" ("Crazies")	Digital download	Non-album singles
2019	"Treshchiny" ("Cracks")	Digital download, airplay, music video	DNK Mira
2019	"Polozhi Menya Ryadom" ("Let Me Lie Next You")	Digital download, airplay, music video	DNK Mira
2020	"Ty Nravishsya Mne" ("I Like You")	Digital download, airplay, music video	DNK Mira
2020	"Katatsumuri" ("Snails") (feat. Noize MC)	Digital download, airplay	Non-album single
2020	"Nedolyubili" ("Not Loved Enough")	Digital download	DNK Mira
2023	"Kity-Koshki" ("Whale-Cats")	Digital download, music video	DNK Mira
