= Lefteris Lazarou =

Greek chef

Lefteris Lazarou is a Greek chef. Born in 1952 at Piraeus, Athens Greece. He is the first Greek chef to have received a Michelin Star and is considered one of the most influential in Greece, due to his expertise in fish & seafood based dishes. He is the son of a ship chef. He is currently the chef in the Athens-based restaurant called Varoulko which is considered a fine dining restaurant. He himself opened Varoulko in 1987. His popularity peaked in 2010 due to his involvement in the Greek version of the famous MasterChef cooking show, as one of the three panel-judge chefs. He has taught in the Culinary Institute of America.
