= Vorona (album) =

Vorona Ворона

Studio album by Linda
- Released: December 3, 1996
- Recorded: June – August 1996
- Genre: Alternative rock, folk rock, trip hop, indie-rock
- Length: 53:09
- Label: Kristal'naya Muzyka
- Producer: Maxim Fadeev

Linda chronology
Tantsi tibetskikh lam (1994)	Vorona; Ворона (1996)	Vorona. Remake. Remix (1997)

Singles from Vorona
- 1. "Krug ot ruki" Released: 1995; 2. "Severniy veter" Released: September 1996; 3. "Vorona" Released: November 1996; 4. "Marijuana" Released: May 1997

Vorona (Russian: Ворона; lit. Crow) is the second studio album by the Russian ethno-rock singer Linda, released in 1996. The album has sold 1.5 million copies and took 3rd place in top best-selling albums in Russia in 1997."Vorona" had a great influence on popular culture and music of Russia. Music critics noted that the album became the top in the music career both of Linda and Maxim Fadeev. In November 2010 the album was included in the list of "50 best Russian albums of all time. Selection of young musicians" by the Afisha magazine.

== Track listing ==
All tracks are written by Maxim Fadeev

No.	Title	Length
1.	"Kholod" (Холод, lit. Cold)	1:52
2.	"Severniy Veter" (Северный Ветер, lit. Northern wind)	5:38
3.	"Nikogda" (Никогда, lit. Never)	4:31
4.	"Vorona" (Ворона, lit. Crow)	5:33
5.	"Marikhuana" (Марихуана, lit. Marijuana)	5:33
6.	"Siditye Potishe" (Сидите Потише, lit. Sit quietly)	5:18
7.	"Nikomu Ya Tebya Ne Otdam" (Никому Я Тебя Не Отдам, lit. I won't give you to anyone)	5:06
8.	"Dikiye" (Дикие, lit. Wild)	4:15
9.	"Volchitsa" (Волчица, lit. She-wolf)	3:36
10.	"Krug ot Ruki" (Круг От Руки, lit. Free-hand Circle)	4:29
11.	"Mih" (Мы, lit. We)	3:17
12.	"Ot Kholoda do tepla" (От Холода До Тепла, lit. From the cold to the heat)	4:01
