= Mikhail Ankudinov =

Soviet intelligence officer

Mikhail Tikhonovich Ankudinov
- Born: 9 September 1905; Bogorodskoye, Tetyushsky Uyezd, Kazan Governorate, Russian Empire
- Died: January 1974 (aged 68)
- Military career
- Allegiance: Soviet Union
- Branch: Red Army / Soviet Army
- Service years: 1925–1963
- Rank: Lieutenant-general
- Commands: Intelligence Section, 15th Army (February 1941 - ?); Intelligence Directorate, Leningrad Military District (1950 - 1962)
- Conflicts: World War II
- Awards: Order of Lenin (2)

Mikhail Tikhonovich Ankudinov (Russian: Михаил Тихонович Анкудинов; 9 September 1905 – January 1974) was a Soviet military intelligence officer during World War II. He served as head of the intelligence directorate of the Leningrad Military District in 1950-1962 and retired from the Soviet Army as a lieutenant-general in 1963.

== Biography ==
Mikhail Ankudinov was born in 1905 and joined the Red Army and the Communist Party of the Soviet Union in 1925.

He graduated from an infantry school in 1928 and an armored troops' course in 1932. He graduated from the Frunze Military Academy in Moscow in 1937 and served with the intelligence section of the Special Red Banner Far Eastern Army staff in the Soviet Far East from June 1938 to December 1939.

He next served as a deputy chief of intelligence section for the staff of the 2nd Red Banner Army, also in the Far East, from December 1939 to August 1940, and deputy chief of intelligence for the Far Eastern Front from August 1940 until February 1941, when he became the chief officer of the intelligence section of the staff of the 15th Army.

A major-general after the war, he served as the chief of the Intelligence Directorate of the Leningrad Military District staff in 1950–1962.

He reached the rank of lieutenant-general during his Leningrad Military District intelligence service in 1957 and retired from the Soviet Army in 1963.

Lieutenant-General Ankudinov died in 1974.

== Awards ==
- Order of Lenin, twice
- Order of the Red Banner, twice
- Order of the Patriotic War, 1st class
- Order of the Red Star, twice
