= MasterChef Greece =

- Genre: Cooking
- Directed by: Panos Georgiou (1–4); Costas Tripylas (5–)
- Presented by: Eugenia Manolidou; Maria Mpekatorou; Mary Synatsaki; Sotiris kontizas; Leonidas koutsopoulos; Panos Ioannidis; Eleni Psyhouli; Manolis Papoutsakis; Magky Tabakaki
- Judges: Dimitris Skarmoutsos; Lefteris Lazarou; Yiannis Loukakos; Panos Ioannidis; Sotiris Kontizas; Leonidas Koutsopoulos
- Theme music composer: Scissor Sisters
- Opening theme: Fire with Fire
- Countries of origin: Greece; Cyprus
- Original language: Greek
- No. of seasons: 12
- No. of episodes: 930

Production
- Executive producers: Nikos Christoforou (1–3); Savvas Bellas (4–); Giannis Thiraios (6–)
- Producer: Nikos Christoforou
- Production location: Studio Karamanos AE
- Running time: 60–240 minutes (including commercials)
- Production companies: Shine Group in association with Ziji productions Studio ATA

Original release
- Network: Mega Channel
- Release: 3 October 2010 – 14 March 2013
- Network: Star Channel (3–)
- Release: 4 May 2017 – present

MasterChef Greece is a Greek competitive cooking game show based on the original British MasterChef. The show began airing on 3 October 2010 on Mega Channel and aired two seasons until 2013. From 2017, the show is airing on Star Channel. Until now eight seasons have aired on Star Channel.

The first and second season of the show aired on Mega Channel from 2010 to 2013, with Eugenia Manolidou and Mary Synatsaki as presenters, respectively.

In March 2017, Star Channel acquired the rights to the show, thus reviving MasterChef after four years and this time was not a presenter like the previous seasons. The third season premiered on 4 May 2017. Two more seasons of episodes followed in 2018 and 2019. The show was renewed for a sixth season, which premiered on 27 January 2020 on the same channel. The seventh season aired in 2021 on Star Channel.

After the completion of the first season, Mega Channel created a spin-off of the competition, in which children aged 8–13 participated and it was titled Junior MasterChef Greece. The show aired in the 2011–2012 season with Maria Mpekatorou as presenter. In 2018, Star Channel renewed Junior MasterChef for a second season, which began airing on 13 September 2018 and ended on 24 December 2018, without a presenter.

== Hosts and Judges ==
Timeline of hosts and judges
Starring	Seasons											
Starring	1	2	3	4	5	6	7	8	9	10	11	12
Current
Sotiris Kontizas			Host & Judge	Host & Judge	Host & Judge	Host & Judge	Host & Judge	Host & Judge	Host & Judge	Host & Judge	Host & Judge	Host & Judge
Panos Ioannidis			Host & Judge	Host & Judge	Host & Judge	Host & Judge	Host & Judge	Host & Judge	Host & Judge	Host & Judge	Host & Judge	Host & Judge
Leonidas Koutsopoulos	Food & Beverage Manager		Food & Beverage Manager	Host & Judge	Host & Judge	Host & Judge	Host & Judge	Host & Judge	Host & Judge	Host & Judge	Host & Judge	Host & Judge
Former
Dimitris Skarmoutsos	Judge	Judge	Host & Judge									
Lefteris Lazarou	Judge	Judge										
Yiannis Loukakos	Judge	Judge										
Eugenia Manolidou	Host											
Mary Synatsaki		Host										

== Series overview ==
Until now in Greece have been aired twelve seasons.

Season	Number of contestants	Number of episodes	Originally aired		Network	Top 3 Contestants		
Season	Number of contestants	Number of episodes	First aired	Last aired	Network	Winner	Runner-up	Third place
1	20	72	3 October 2010	28 December 2010	Mega Channel	Akis Petretzikis	Michalis Kalavrinos	Giannis Apostolakis
2	25	83	24 December 2012	14 March 2013	Mega Channel	Kostis Kampas & Babis Koudouris		Giorgos Gerardos
3	20	72	4 May 2017	30 July 2017	Star Channel	Lampros Vakiaros	Konstantinos Tsiatsios	Giorgos Porphyris
4	22	84	10 January 2018	8 May 2018	Star Channel	Timoleon Diamantis	Christos Glossidis	Argyris Aglamisis
5	21	84	21 January 2019	22 May 2019	Star Channel	Manolis Sarris	Spyridoula Karaboutaki	Christos Barkas
6	24	77	27 January 2020	17 June 2020	Star Channel	Stavros Varthalitis	Stavros Georgiou	Maria Bey
7	24	92	23 January 2021	9 June 2021	Star Channel	Margarita Nikolaidi	Dionysis Sarakinis	Marina Demollaj
8	24	96	10 January 2022	15 June 2022	Star Channel	Panagiotis Koumoundouros	Kalliopi Bezante	Elpida Morfouli
9	34	86	16 January 2023	14 June 2023	Star Channel	Maria Bey	Nikos Trakas	Alexandros Antonelakis
10	24	90	15 January 2024	13 June 2024	Star Channel	Lefteris Zafeiropoulos	Christina Christofi	Ilias Panagiotou
11	29	94	20 January 2025	25 June 2025	Star Channel	Nestoras Nestoras	Lefteris Petrou	Vasilis Ferros
12	28	87	18 January 2026	25 June 2026	Star Channel	Panos Telalis	Tasos Pavlidis	Giorgos Dimitriadis

== Series synopsis ==
=== Season 1 (2010) ===
The first season of MasterChef premiered on 3 October 2010 and ended on 28 December 2010 and was hosted by musician and television presenter Eugenia Manolidou. The judges of the Greek show were Yiannis Loukakos, Lefteris Lazarou and Dimitris Skarmoutsos. The winner was Akis Petretzikis.

=== Season 2 (2012–2013) ===
The second season premiered on 24 December 2012. This season was hosted by Maria Synatsaki and all three chefs remain as judges. The show was put on hiatus after the penultimate episode due to financial difficulties of both the production company, Studio ATA, and Mega Channel itself, resulting in both finalists being declared winners. The two winners are Kostis Kampas and Babis Koudouris.

=== Season 3 (2017) ===
The third season premiered on 4 May 2017. The judges of the third season were Dimitris Skarmoutsos, Panos Ioannidis and Sotiris Kontizas. The winner of season 3 was Lambros Vakiaros.

=== Season 4 (2018) ===
The fourth season premiered on 10 January 2018. Ioannidis and Kontizas returned for their second series while Leonidas Koutsopoulos was the new judge of the series. The winner of season 4 was Timoleon Diamantis.

=== Season 5 (2019) ===
The fifth season premiered on 21 January 2019. All three chefs from the previous season returned as judges. The winner of season 5 was Manolis Sarris.

=== Season 6 (2020) ===
The sixth season premiered on 27 January 2020. All three chefs from the previous season returned as judges. The winner of season 6 was Stavros Varthalithis.

=== Season 7 (2021) ===
The seventh premiered on 23 January 2021. All three chefs from the previous season returned as judges. Margarita Nikolaidi became the first female MasterChef Greece winner.

=== Season 8 (2022) ===
The eighth season premiered on 10 January 2022. All three chefs from the previous season returned as judges. The winner of season 8 was Panagiotis Koumoundouros.

=== Season 9 (2023) ===
The ninth season premiered on 16 January 2023. All three judges returned. This season also include previous contestants from Season 3 to 8. The winner of season 9 was Season 6 Semi-Finalist, Maria Bey.

=== Season 10 (2024) ===
The tenth season premiered on 15 January 2024. All three judges returned. This season's Top 24 will be divided into 2 teams throughout the entire season. The winner of season 10 was Lefteris Zafeiropoulos.

=== Season 11 (2025) ===
The eleventh season premiered on 20 January 2025. All three judges returned. The winner of season 11 was Nestoras Nestoras.

=== Season 12 (2026) ===
The twelfth season premiered on 18 January 2026. All three judges returned. This season is the 10th anniversary of MasterChef Greece in Star Channel. The winner of season 12 was Panos Telalis.

== Spin-off ==
Junior MasterChef Greece premiered on 27 November 2011 and ended on 5 February 2012. The judges were the same as MasterChef Greece (Yiannis Loukakos, Lefteris Lazarou and Dimitris Skarmoutsos) and it was hosted by Maria Mpekatorou. The winner was twelve-year-old Lilian Emvaloti.

The second season of Junior MasterChef Greece premiered on 13 September 2018 on Star Channel and ended on 24 December 2018. The judges were Eleni Psyhouli, Manolis Papoutsakis, Magky Tabakaki. Among 44 children, the judges choose the top 22 children (11 girls and 11 boys). The winner was twelve-year-old Konstantinos Christopoulos.
