= Nama (band) =

Greek band

Nama is a Greek pop/jazz/new age music group which started its career 1992 with the debut album NAMA. It was formed by singer Iphigenia and composer Aris Pavlis, who has previously been a member of the electropop group "Cinema".

After seven albums and two times awarded for best pop group in Greece by the Arion music awardsIFPI Greece 2002 and 2006, they recorded their last album in winter 2008.

== Discography ==
=== NAMA (1992) ===
- In 1990 Aris Pavlis and Iphigenia Papoutsa started a new project under the group name "NAMA" that lasted until 2009.
- The first album, called "NAMA", came out in April 1992 and broke the charts with the song "Odysseus"

=== ΝΑΜΑ ΙΙ (1994) ===
- In 1994 their second LP 'NAMA' was released by LYRA. With this follow-up record NAMA broadened their fan base, as well as satisfying existing fans, with the song 'Prigipas Alitis".

=== ANAMNISIS (memories) (1995) ===
In the two that followed, there was pressures from the music industry for every band to relinquish any sense of artistic integrity that they might possess, and collaborate with artists of completely different genres, so as to combine the artist 'selling power and create a monstrous yet more profitable project for the record labels. NAMA found a way to avoid this restriction whilst still complying with the terms of their contract - to produce a third record. In 1995 they released "ANAMNISIS" again with LYRA. In this album NAMA reinvented ten old songs-Including their first hit,"Odysseus". At first it appeared, as though it would be difficult to obtain permission from composers such as Mimis Plessas, Manos Hatzidakis, Dionysis Savvopoulos, Manolis Chiotis, amongst others. Nevertheless, every composers and lyricist approached readily agreed, testament to the respect that NAMA has. Moreover, songs like "MIA AGAPI GIA TO KALOKAIRI " quickly became classics.

=== NAMA III (1998) ===
- Faithful to the path they paved, with their rhythmic diversity and distinct color of lyrics and interpretations, NAMA released ten new songs under the title
- 'NAMA III-ZOI PARASTASI' In 1998. Jazz, pop, rock, and ethnic strokes made up the music-colored canvas of this album.

=== NAMA IV (2002) ===
- In the Summer of 2001, the CD single "MIA KYRIAKI" was released by EROSMUSIC. The fresh rock sound was soon on the radio and the namesake song 'MIA KIRIAKI' became a hit.
- In 2001, NAMA were awarded the ARION Music Award-Best Pop Group for "MIA KIRIAKI".The LP 'NAMA IV' was released in the following year.

=== ENA MAKRY TAXIDI (a long journey) (2005) ===
- In the summer of 2004, NAMA produced another CD single with four new songs in a Jazz, Latin, blues style.'TO PSARAKI' tells the story of a fish that falls in love with a cat, to disastrous effect.
- The song became an airplay summer hit.'MAMBO SOLERO', a jazz]/Latin song written in Spanish, was aired in various station in South America.

'ENA MAKRY TAXIDI','NAMA's sixth album, was released by MBI in 2005. It produced yet another summer hit song in 'ZESTO KALOKAIRI'.

- NAMA were awarded the 2006 ARION Music Award-Best Pop Group for 'ENA MAKRY TAXIDI'.

== Worked with ==
Dimis Papachristou (guitars), Kostas Kostaroglou (piano), Vasilis Moustos (piano), Thimios Papadopoulos (woodwinds), Takis Marinakis (drums\percussion), Antonis Apergis (folk flutes), Valentino Beikoff (violin), Nikos Sakelarakis (trumpet), Maximos Drakos (piano)
