= Lambis Livieratos =

Greek singer and actor (born 1966)

- Λάμπης Λιβιεράτος
- Born: Χαράλαμπος Λιβιεράτος; 3 April 1966 (age 60); Athens, Greece
- Occupations: Singer; composer; songwriter
- Years active: 1992–present
- Spouse: Evi Adam (m. 1999; div. 2012)
- Children: 2

Lambis Livieratos (Greek: Λάμπης Λιβιεράτος; born 3 April 1966), is a Greek singer and actor from Athens, Greece.

== Life and career ==
=== Early years 1987–1992 ===
In 1987, Livieratos graduated from the Drama School of G. Theodosiadis. His first theatrical performance as an actor was during the winter of 1988 in a play called "Ξενοδοχείο Ο Παράδειεισος"(Xenodohio O Paradisos) in English "Paradise Hotel". Two years later, he got his first leading role by playing in various theater and TV productions. He made his first musical attempt in 1992 singing live at a night club on the side of Giorgos Marinos. His first appearance in music was with his participation in Thanos Kalliris' record with the song "O Neos Ine Oreos" (The Young Man is Nice) and a guest appearance in Alexis Papadimitriou's record with the track "O Kyklos Tou Erota" (The Circle of Love).

In 1993, he released his first album, "As eixa ti dinami"(I Wish I Had the Strength), under Sony Music. In 1994, he released his second album,"Ypothesi Prosopiki" (Personal Case).

=== The Golden Age 1996–1999 ===
In his 3rd album "Bam kai Kato", released in 1996, he makes a smash hit written by Natalia Germanou and composed by Nikos Karvelas. The song "Skorpia Zoi", with music and lyrics by himself, is also included in the album which was also his first Golden one with over 50,000 sales.

He composed most of the tracks on his next album "To kalitero pedi" (The best kid) and collaborated with lyricists Natalia Germanou, Antonis Pappas, Yiorgos Laskaris, Konstantinos Tseronis, and Natassa Theodoridou.

He appeared in many major music shows in Greece performing alongside some of Greece's most famous artists such as Anna Vissi, Yiannis Parios, Vassilis Karras, Kaiti Garbi, Despina Vandi, Giorgos Mazonakis, Antonis Remos and Marinella.

In the season 1996–1997, while Antonis Remos was making his debut, they had a huge success in Athens singing together in the club "Thalassies Hantres" in Thisio.

In 1999, he married a Greek fashion model, Evi Adam (Greek: Εύη Αδάμ) on the island of Ios. They have two daughters, Danae and Nefeli. They divorced in 2010.

=== The Millennium years ===
In the year 2000, he provided vocals for Tarzan in the Greek dub of the same title animated film.

In his last album, "Den Yparho Makria sou" (I Don't Exist Away From You) released in 2003, he sang a duet with his then wife, Evi Adam, called "Paradeise Mou" (My Paradise) which also climbed the charts.

In 2006, he played two leading roles. One being in the ANT1 TV series "Ela na agapithoume" (Let's Love Each Other), which was a success among the Greek viewers and the other being in the theatrical play "Funny" with Mimi Denissi.

In 2010, he took part in the theatrical musical "Marinella The Musical" in Thessaloniki Concert Hall with Marinella on the leading role.

Since 2014, he has performed in live shows with his band all over Greece and abroad.

In 2020, he took part on the famous TV show in Greece, Your Face Sounds Familiar on ANT1 TV.

== Discography ==
- 1993 – Ας Είχα Τη Δύναμη / As Eiha Ti Dynami
- 1994 – Χριστούγεννα Χωρίς Εσένα / Hristougenna Horis Esena
- 1994 – Υπόθεση Προσωπική / Ypothesi Prosopiki
- 1996 – Μπαμ Και Κάτω / Bam Kai Kato
- 1997 – Το Τεράστιο Κίτρινο Πράγμα / To Terastio Kitrino Pragma
- 1998 – Ποιός Είναι Αυτός; / Poios Einai Autos;
- 1998 – Ρόδα Είναι… / Roda Einai…
- 1999 – Το Καλύτερο Παιδί / To Kalytero Paidi
- 2000 – Το Μάθημα / To Mathima
- 2000 – Λάμπεις Μωρό Μου / Labis Moro Mou
- 2001 – Έλα / Ela
- 2002 – Λίγο Πρίν / Ligo Prin
- 2003 – Δεν Υπάρχω Μακριά Σου / Den Yparho Makria Sou
- 2003 – Οι Μεγαλύτερες Επιτυχίες / Oi Megalyteres Epityhies
- 2008 – Χρυσές Επιτυχίες / Hrises Epityhies

=== Singles ===
- 2011 – Επιστροφή Στις Ρίζες / Epistrofi Stis Rizes
- 2015 – Δε Το Χωράει Ο Νους / De To Horaei O Nous
- 2016 – Μία Κι Έξω / Mia Ki Exo
- 2018 – Ο Έρωτας / O Erotas
- 2019 – Σε Παντρεύομαι Χτες / Se Pantreuomai Htes
- 2021 – 15 Γράμματα / 15 Grammata
- 2021 – Κάπου Κάπου Να Θυμάσαι / Kapou Kapou Na Thymasai

=== Duet ===
- 1993 – Ο Παλιός Είναι Αλλιώς / O Palios Einai Allios (ft. Thanos Kalliris)
- 1998 – Δυο Άγνωστοι / Dyo Anagnosti (ft. Stella Kalatzi)
- 2000 – Ο Τρόπος / O Tropos (ft. Natassa Theodoridou)
- 2002 – Eσύ / Esy (ft. Theano)
- 2003 – Σαν Τα Καράβια Που Γυρνάνε Πειραιά / San Ta Karavia Poy Gyrnane Peiraia (ft. Lena Papadopoyloy)
- 2015 – Γύρισε Ξανά / Gyrise Xana (ft. Bo)
