= Elina Konstantopoulou =

Greek singer (born 1970)

Maria-Elpida (Elina) Konstantopoulou (Greek: Ελίνα Κωνσταντοπούλου; born 11 November 1970) is a Greek singer. She represented Greece in the Eurovision Song Contest 1995.

== Biography ==
Konstantopoulou was born in Athens and studied music and singing at the National Conservatory of Athens. She then started to work as a professional singer at night clubs. In 1993, she was introduced to composer Nikos Terzis. They started to work together and Terzis composed three songs for her. She shortly thereafter signed a record contract and her first album was out to the stores in 1994. Though new, Konstantopoulou had the summer hit of Greece in that year: "Otan to tilefono htipisei" (when the phone rings).

In 1995, she and Terzis cooperated once more. This time they tried and eventually succeeded in representing Greece in the Eurovision Song Contest 1995 with the song "Pia prosefhi". The music video was filmed in Meteora and was directed by Dafne Tzaferi. The song had a Greek sound and Konstantopoulou was quite popular during the preparations of the final night in Dublin. She did not make it to the top ten, but was awarded 68 points, including the top 12 points scores from Cyprus and 10 points from Israel, placing 12th out of the 23 participants. In the summer of 1995, she had her second album released with all 12 tracks composed by Terzis.

She continued to sing and record albums throughout the 1990s and in 1997 she had a guest appearance in the Greek series Dio Xenoi; in 1999 she was married. Two years later she had a new single and in 2002, she once again tried to represent Greece at Eurovision. This time she wasn't alone on stage. She was accompanied by the young Cypriot singer Marian Georgiou. Their song "Beautiful Life" was among the ten finalists, but it didn't make it to the first five and didn't compete to the final round.

Her relationship with the Eurovision Song Contest didn't stop there. In 2005, she replaced Elena Patroklou and she accompanied Constantinos Christoforou on stage in Kyiv. In 2010, she released an album under the title Xekina, which contains Greek covers of songs of Thalía and Cristian Castro.

On 1 March 2012, Konstantopoulou released her the single "Mia anamnisi" (one memory) under the label of qooackmusic (a new Internet discography company) . The song is the first out of four new songs that are going to be released during 2012. Composer of the song was Dim_Aros with lyrics by Giorgos Bitounis.

Konstantopoulou got married and had twin sons.

== Discography ==
| Year | Title |
|---|---|
| 1993 | San Paramithi |
| 1995 | Ti Zoi Mou Litrono |
| 1997 | Akouse Me |
| 1998 | Enstikto |
| 1999 | Tha Allaxo Dedomena |
| 2001 | Aftos o Polemos/cd single |
| 2010 | Xekina |
| 2012 | Mia Anamnisi [One Memory] (Digital Single) |

| Preceded by Kostas Bigalis and The Sea Lovers with To trehantiri | Greece in the Eurovision Song Contest; 1995 | Succeeded by Mariana Efstratiou with Emis forame to himona anixiatika |
