= Evridiki =

Greek Cypriot singer (born 1968)

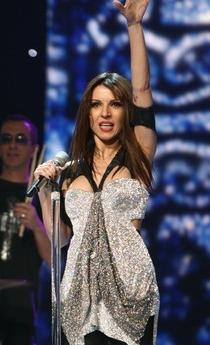
- Evridiki performing "Comme Ci, Comme Ça" at the Eurovision Song Contest 2007

Background information
- Born: 25 February 1968 (age 58); Limassol, Cyprus
- Genres: Pop, techno, rock, electropop
- Occupation: Singer
- Years active: 1991-present
- Label: Panik Records
- Website: http://www.evridikis.com

Evridiki Theokleous (Greek: Ευρυδίκη Θεοκλέους [evriˌðici θeoˈkleus]; born 25 February 1968), known mononymously as Evridiki, is a Greek Cypriot singer. She represented Cyprus in the Eurovision Song Contest in 1992, 1994 and 2007 with the songs "Teriazoume", "Eimai anthropos ki ego" and "Comme Ci, Comme Ça", respectively.

== Music career ==
=== Early years ===
Born in Limassol, Cyprus, Theokleous was raised in the island's capital, Nicosia. While still at school, she studied music at the National Conservatory of Cyprus. When she finished school, she went to Le Studio des Variétés in Paris, where she studied music, theatre, and dancing. Afterwards she went to the Berklee College of Music in Boston, where she supplemented her musical studies with courses of harmony and instrumentation.

In 1989, she moved to Athens to work with several artists, sing in compilations, and in 1991, she released her first personal album Gia Proti Fora.

=== Collaboration with Theofanous ===
Their first collaboration was in 1992 with the album Kane pos m agapas. The album did well in sales and received high airplay. In 1993, Evridiki released her album Missise Me (Hate Me). In 1994, she started working on her next album Fthinoporo Gynaikas (Woman's Autumn). Inspired by the idea of her growing older as the time passes, the album was a mixture of pop and Greek folklore music. Theofanous was the main composer and producer of Evridiki's first nine albums while he collaborated with Minos EMI A&R manager Vangelis Yannopoulos in 1998 and 1999. Albums like Dese Mou ta Matia (1998) (her first Golden album), To Koumpi (1999) and Ola Dika Sou (2000), with their pop/laiko sound, are characteristic of Evridiki's Theofanous period.

=== Career turn – collaboration with Korgialas ===
In 2002, Evridiki made a turn in her career. After her divorce, she turned from pop music to rock/alternative. In her 2002 album Live Ki Allios she performed well known rock songs. In 2002, she also performed on stage as Taptim in the musical The King and I, produced by Mimi Denisi with positive reviews by public and critics.

After having a studio music break for almost three years, Evridiki released the album Oso Fevgo Gyrizo (2003), in which she wrote two songs. She released another record Sto Idio Vagoni (2005). In both albums she collaborated to musician Dimitris Korgialas. Korgialas was the composer of "Comme Ci, Comme Ça" (Cyprus' entry at the Eurovision Song Contest 2007). The same year (2007) Evridiki's album 13 (her thirteenth personal album) was released (on 26 March 2007). Later, the same year, she was awarded as the Singer of the Year in Cyprus.

In 2009, Evridiki released the album Etsi Einai I Agapi, performing together with Korgialas. The next year (2010) the CD-single "Etsi Apla" was released. In 2017, Evridiki collaborated with Lopodites, a local pop-rock band based in Cyprus. The collaboration continued in 2018 when she appeared on stage once again with Lopodites and female singer Georgia Kerala (vocalist of the band Ble) at Ravens Music Hall in Limassol.

Besides George Theophanous and Korgialas, she has worked with other writers in Greek music industry; Vasilis Papakonstantinou, Giorgos Hatzinasios, Yannis Spanos, Marios Tokas, Vangelis Dimitriadis, Christos Dantis, Natalia Germanou, Eleni Peta, Antonis and Yannis Vardis, Stelios Rokkos, and Sakis Rouvas.

== Participation in Eurovision Song Contest ==
She represented Cyprus in the Eurovision Song Contest in 1992 (Malmö, Sweden) with the song "Teriazoume" (finishing in eleventh place), and then in 1994 (Dublin, Ireland) with "Eimai anthropos ki ego". The latter caused controversial reactions from critics and the audience due to the song's political allusion to The Cyprus Problem. On the other hand, it became a hot favourite to win because of its ethnic sound and her very sentimental performance. As with her first entry in the contest two years previously, Evridiki took eleventh place. Evridiki also appeared as a backing vocalist in Eurovision on three separate occasions, in 1983, 1986, and 1987.

In 2007, she was selected to represent Cyprus for a third time, in that year's contest, with a French-language song "Comme Ci, Comme Ça" whose lyrics were written by Posidonas Giannopoulos and its music composed by Korgialas. Despite being one of the favourites to win the competition, it failed to make it through the semi-final stage of the competition finishing 15th.

In 2008, she appeared at the Junior Eurovision Song Contest 2008 in which she performed the theme song of the contest, Fun in the Sun with her then husband Korgialas.

== Personal life ==
In 1994, Evridiki married Giorgos Theofanous. Together, they had a son Angelos, who was born in November 1996.

== Discography ==
Studio albums

- 1991 – Gia proti fora (Για πρώτη φορά) (re-issue CD with 3 more tracks)
- 1992 – Poso ligo me xeris (Πόσο λίγο με ξέρεις)
- 1993 – Misise me (Μίσησέ με) (re-issue CD with 2 more tracks)
- 1995 – Fthinoporo gynaikas (Φθινόπωρο γυναίκας)
- 1996 – I epomeni mera (Η επόμενη μέρα) (double CD with a live recording)
- 1997 – Pes to mmou afto (Πες το μου αυτό)
- 1998 – Dese mou ta matia (Δέσε μου τα μάτια)
- 1999 – To koumbi (Το κουμπί)
- 2000 – Ola dika sou (Όλα δικά σου)
- 2002 – Live ki allios (Live κι αλλιώς)
- 2003 – Oso fevgo gyrizo (Όσο φεύγω γυρίζω)
- 2005 – Sto idio vagoni (Στο ίδιο βαγόνι)
- 2007 – 13 (Δεκατρία)
- 2009 – Etsi einai i agapi (Έτσι είναι η αγάπη) (with Dimitris Korgialas)
- 2011 – Oneirevomai akoma mama (Ονειρεύομαι ακόμα μαμά)
- 2017 – 25 gia panta (25 για πάντα)

EPs

- 2010 – ...Etsi apla (...Έτσι απλά)

Singles

- 1992 – "Tairiazoume" ("Ταιριάζουμε")
- 1994 – "Eimai anthropos ki ego" ("Είμαι άνθρωπος κι εγώ")
- 1996 – "Afto to fili" ("Αυτό το φιλί")
- 1997 – "As en tziai mian foran" ("Ας εν τζιαί μιαν φοράν")
- 1997 – "Pes to mou afto" ("Πες το μου αυτό")
- 2008 – "I Zoi Ehei Hroma" ("Η ζωή έχει χρώμα")

Promo singles

- 1993 – "Misise me" ("Μίσησέ με")
- 1995 – "Fthinoporo ginekas: Fovamai/Ti theleis apo mena" ("Φθινόπωρο γυναίκας: Φοβάμαι/Τι θέλεις από μένα")
- 2003 – "Piase me" ("Πιάσε με")
- 2005 – "Sto idio vagoni" ("Στο ίδιο βαγόνι")
- 2005 – "Thelo toso na se do" ("Θέλω τόσο να σε δω")
- 2007 – "Comme ci, comme ça"

As featured artist

- 1990 – To Proto Mas Party [LP]
- 1990 – Erotika Minimata by Pashalis (Arvanitidis)
- 1997 – En Psyhro by Giorgos Alkaios
- 1999 – One by One
- 2002 – O Vasilias ki Ego
- 2003 – Tragoudi sta Pedia (Live) by Giorgos Theofanous
- 2003 – Esis i Fili Mou ki Ego by Vassilis Papakonstantinou
- 2003 – As' ta Dyskola se Mena by Dimitris Korgialas
- 2005 – I Mera Fevgi by Dimitris Korgialas
- 2006 – EuroRevisions (compilation) produced by Giorgis Christodoulou
- 2006 – I Apli Methodos ton Trion by Imiskoumbria
- 2008 – Ta Koutia Ine Koufa by Dimitris Korgialas

== Videography ==
- Τα Λόγια Που Μου Λες
- Τα Μυστικά Άπ' Το Καλοκαίρι
- Για Πρώτη Φορά
- Το Μόνο Που Θυμάμαι
- Φύγε
- Ταιριάζουμε
- Πυξίδα
- Κάνε Πως Μ' Αγαπάς
- Πόσο Λίγο Με Ξέρεις
- Τέρμα
- Ο Επόμενος Αιώνας
- Μίσησέ Με
- Ζηλιάρης Ουρανός
- Μόνο Μια Στιγμή
- Τώρα Ζω Για Μένα
- Είμαι Άνθρωπος κι Εγώ
- Φθινόπωρο Γυναίκας
- Φοβάμαι
- Πορτραίτο
- Είναι Που Δεν Σ' Έχω
- Αυτό το Φιλί
- Να Με Κοιτάς
- Στον Πέμπτο
- Έλα
- Για Ποιαν Αγάπη Μου Μιλάς
- Ας εν Τζιαί Μιαν Φοράν
- Πες το Μου Αυτό
- Να του Πείτε
- Περασμένα Μεσάνυχτα
- Με Ξενύχτια και Με Πόνο
- Σημάδι στο Λαιμό
- Δέσε Μου τα Μάτια
- Λεπίδες
- Δεν Τελειώνουμε Ποτέ
- Το Κουμπί
- Αυτά Που Κρύβω Μέσα Μου
- Το Τρίτο Συρτάρι
- Για Μένα
- Όλα Δικά Σου
- Τα Διαγραμμένα
- Ο Βασιλιάς κι Εγώ Medley
- Ερωτεύομαι
- Ζηλεύει η Νύχτα
- Πιάσε Με
- Σταγόνα στο Αιγαίο
- Δεν Έχει Σίδερα η Καρδιά Σου
- Στο Ίδιο Βαγόνι
- Θέλω Τόσο Να Σε Δω
- Ζωή Να Μπω
- Αν Ήσουν Άλλος
- Έτσι Κι Έτσι
- Κάποιον Άλλον
- Πρέπει Να Βρω Τη Λύση
- Η Ζωή Έχει Χρώμα
- Άσε Με (Έτσι Είναι Η Αγάπη)
- Θάλασσα

| Preceded by Elena Patroklou with SOS | Cyprus in the Eurovision Song Contest; 1992 | Succeeded by Kyriakos Zympoulakis & Dimos Van Beke with Mi stamatas |
| Preceded by Kyriakos Zympoulakis & Dimos Van Beke with Mi stamatas | Cyprus in the Eurovision Song Contest; 1994 | Succeeded by Alex Panayi with Sti fotia |
| Preceded by Annette Artani with Why Angels Cry | Cyprus in the Eurovision Song Contest; 2007 | Succeeded by Evdokia Kadi with Femme Fatale |
