= Bang (Greek band) =

Greek male vocal duo

- Origin: Greece
- Genres: Pop
- Labels: Innervision, RCA
- Past members: Thanos Calliris; Vassilis Dertilis; Michalis Capoulas

Bang was a Greek male vocal duo, consisting of Paul Stevens (vocals, guitar) (according to Billboard "Top Pop Singles" and several other unofficial sources, his real name is Thanos Kalliris) and Billy Adams (Vassilis Dertilis) (keyboards). They had chart success with the single "You're the One", released on the RCA label. It entered the UK Singles Chart on 6 May 1989, reaching #74. It was in the chart for two weeks. The B-side of the 7" version was "Don't Burn Down the Bridge", with the 12" having an additional instrumental version.

They represented Greece in the ESC 1987 and had minor success in Europe and Japan.

== Biography ==
Bang was formed in 1987 consisting of members Thanos Kalliris, Vasilis Dertilis and Michalis Capoulas. The band's first release was "Run for Your Love" on Polydor. Capoulas left soon after and the band became a duo. In 1987, the duo competed in the Greek selection for the Eurovision Song Contest 1987. Their song, "Stop", a pop/funk dance anthem was a success and the duo, along with Thanos' sister Katerina Kalliri, Mariana Efstratiou (who would later represent Greece in Eurovision 1989 & 1996) and Laura Burke doing the backing vocals, travelled to Brussels for the contest.

The song started in Brussels with high hopes and good reviews, but scored only 64 points, reaching the 10th place. That however was a good result for a Greek entry at the time and the band was a massive hit back home. Bang pursued an international career and worked with Shep Pettibone, François Kevorkian and others. Until 1991, they issued 3 LPs and many maxi-singles in Greece, Europe, USA and Japan. For their single "Holding My Heart", they had a video clip entirely shot in Hollywood and the single "You're the One" entered the UK Top 75 singles chart. Bang is the only Greek pop act that toured Japan.

In 1990, they released the album, Clockwise, on the German Ariola label. They also had a minor hit on the Billboard Hot 100 with "Holding My Heart", which peaked at #93.

From 1992, Thanos followed a solo career becoming one of the most popular pop singers in Greece during the 1990s.

== Discography ==
Year	Title	Format
1987	"Run for Your Love"	Maxi single
1987	"Stop"	Maxi single
1987	Bang - The Album	Album
1988	"You're the One"	Single
1989	"You're the One"	Maxi single (#74, UK Top Singles)
1990	"Holding My Heart"	Single (#93, US Hot 100)
1990	Clockwise	Album
1991	Kane to Lathos	Album

Preceded by Takis Biniaris with Miazoume	Greece in the Eurovision Song Contest; 1987	Succeeded by Afroditi Frida with Clown
