= Stefanos Korkolis =

Greek composer, pianist (born 1960)

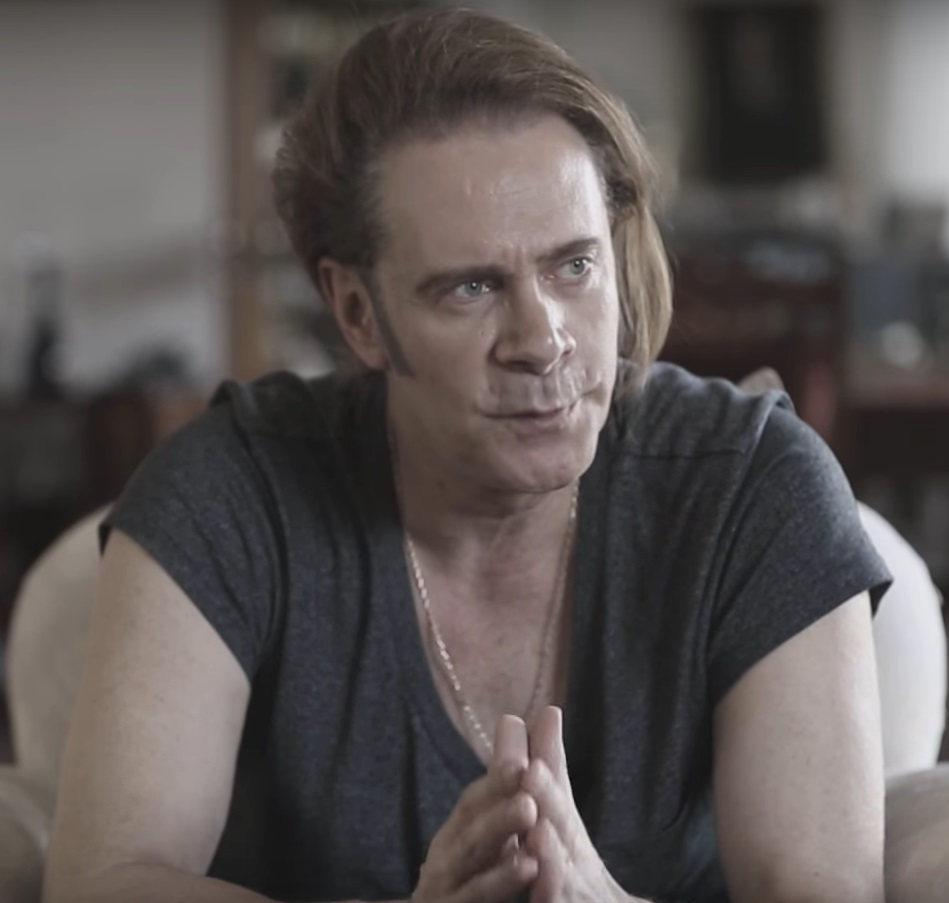
Stefanos Korkolis

Stefanos Korkolis (Greek: Στέφανος Κορκολής; born 12 September 1960) is a Greek composer and pianist. He has performed in theaters and auditoriums all around the world, including the Concertgebouw, the Belém Cultural Center (Portugal and Brazil), the Royal Theater Carré, the Athens Concert Hall, the Thessaloniki Concert Hall, and the Odeon of Herodes Atticus.

== Early life ==
Stefanos was born in Athens and showed a passion for music in his early youth. At the age of 4, although unaware of musical notation, he had the ability of memorizing pieces of classical music with great ease and reproducing them on the piano almost intact. He began his studies at the Athens Conservatoire under the guidance of the late Marika Papaioannou and the instruction of Phoebe Vallinda. After receiving his diploma in piano, he traveled to Paris to continue his studies – thanks to a fellowship from the French government – next to internationally renowned pianist Yvonne Lefébure. He simultaneously attended courses in composition, orchestration, conducting and cinema music. These included classes by Pierre Boulez, Astor Piazzolla and other acclaimed music masters.

While in Paris, Stefanos became acquainted with famous Argentinian pianist, Martha Argerich and was joined by ties of friendship and mutual artistic appreciation. It was thanks to Martha that Stefanos dream to meet the great Vladimir Horowitz came true. In his short apprenticeship with Horowitz, Stefanos learned about the true value of music as well as techniques that only a master of that caliber could transfuse. By that time Stefanos completed his studies at the Conservatoire de Paris and the École Normale de Musique de Paris he achieved the first prize for modern ballet composition at the Val-de-Marne International Music Festival. He kept on performing around the world with a repertory consisting mainly of his own works as well as works by great Russian composers, such as Alexander Scriabin and Sergei Prokofiev. His performances were received with much enthusiasm and received excellent critiques, which continue until today.

== Career ==
=== International collaborations ===
Some of Stefano's worldwide collaborations include Alfredo Kraus, José Carreras, Teresa Berganza, Dulce Pontes, Lucio Dalla, Luca Carboni, and Vittorio Grigolo. During his collaboration with the famous Portuguese artist Dulce Pontes, touring, being her permanent conductor, orchestrator and pianist, he also worked with Academy Award Winner Ennio Morricone, along with Horacio Ferrer, Astor Piazzolla's poet.

=== Greek collaborations ===
Some of Stefano's important collaborations are with Vicky Leandros and Nana Mouskouri. He also collaborated with various important artists in Greece like Dimitra Galani, Alkistis Protopsalti, Mario Frangoulis, George Dalaras, Dimitris Mitropanos, Marinella, Antonis Remos, Sakis Rouvas, Maria Dimitriadi, George Perris and others.

He wrote music for the play "Theodora", directed by the memorable Michael Cacoyannis (known for the movie Zorba the Greek). He also wrote the music for the film of Michael Cacoyannis' "Up, down and sideways." During a period of seven years, the period of his "musical adolescence" as Stefanos often refers to, without giving up the classical concerts, he included modern Greek music in his activities, first as arranger – composer and then as a performer of his own compositions, winning multiple platinum albums and performing in front of packed stadiums in Greece, Cyprus and Italy.

=== Orchestra and auditoriums ===
He has collaborated with orchestras such as the Prague Philharmonic Orchestra, the Bulgarian National Radio Symphony Orchestra, the Warsaw National Philharmonic Orchestra, the Leipzig Gewandhaus Orchestra, the Orchestra Mozart and others. He has performed under the baton of acclaimed conductors such as Vladimír Válek, Valeri Vatchev, Alexander Myrat, Dimitris Agrafiotis, Nick Tshouchlos, Simeon Cogan and others.

He has performed in great theaters and auditoriums all around the world, like the Concertbaum (Netherlands), the Opera de la Corunia, the Centro Cultural de Belem (Portugal and Brazil), the Carre Theatre of Amsterdam and of course the Athens Concert Hall, the Thessaloniki Concert Hall, and the Odeon Herodus Atticus. He was invited to perform at José Carreras' gala in Leipzig. He also composed the Russian Air Force Anthem that he performed in Kremlin for the celebration of the 85th anniversary of the Federal Air Transport Agency under permission by the Dmitri Shostakovich family for the transcription for piano and orchestra of Shostakovitch's work, the Concertino for two pianos.

Stefanos is the official ambassador of Mikis Theodorakis' music in Greece and abroad. In May 2017, at the request of Mikis Theodorakis, he presented symphonic works of the latter, in Cologne, in the presence of the composer himself, and on 1 September 2017, Stefanos once again appeared at the Herodes Atticus theatre, in the framework of a charity concert to support the Association of Friends of Children with Cancer "ELPIDA", next to Maria Farantouri and Sofia Manousaki.

=== Special Olympics ===
He has composed the Special Olympics' Anthem and also the song of the Union "Mazi gia to pedi – Together for the child", for charity purposes of which Stefanos gave a concert in September 2012 at the Odeon of Herodes Atticus (Athens Herodion). The concert had an enormous success and the revenues, which reached the amount of 153,000 euros, were distributed entirely to 10 clubs of the Union.

== Other projects ==
Stefanos finished his last project abroad entitled "Bloody Faeries", a production of British producer Haydn Bendall and he continues to give worldwide concerts as a soloist in recitals and in orchestra collaborations. In January 2014, during a concert at the Chopin Academy of Music in Warsaw, in January 2014, Stefanos premiered Sophia Manousaki, a young singer.

On 27 August 2014, Stefanos and Sophia Manousaki launched "Αrt in the Square" at the Cyprus Limassol Marina. Also, on September 5, 2014 Stefanos participated in the charity concert "Sing Me an Angel" at the Odeon of Herodes Atticus (Athens Herodion), in collaboration with the tenor Mario Frangoulis and Norwegian soprano Sissel, under the direction of conductor, Richard Balcombe. In September 2014 he participated in the Russian-Cypriot charity gala at the gardens of the Presidential Palace in Cyprus.

In May 2015, Stefanos' album, "Sinantisi / the Meeting", was released in Greece and Cyprus, where as a piano soloist, Stefanos played pieces from the Greek composer Mikis Theodorakis, with vocals of Sophia Manousaki.

A ceremony for the Sinantisi/the Meeting composiiton was presented on October 17, 2015, at The Award Ceremony of the Gold Disc, in the Athens Concert Hall with Theodorakis in attendance complimenting Stefanos/Manousaki concert. The concert toured 20 cities across Greece to sold-out venues.

Stefanos' previously released song, "Thes", from the album "Pes mou t' alithina sou", with lyrics by Rebecca Roussi and vocals by Dimitris Mitropanos found new success eleven years after initial release, contributed to the song's inclusion in a television commercial, sending it to the top of the charts.

In November 2016, the "Sinantisi" concert was presented in Paris' Alambra Theatre, where Stefanos and Manousaki presented the follow-up album, "Synantisi II", which included "A Sea Full of Music" with lyrics by Dimitra Manda and "Chairetismoi" with lyrics from Giannis Theodorakis, Angeliki Eleftheriou and Mikis Theodorakis. These compositions were also included in the album "Betrayed Projects" by Mikis Theodorakis.

In April 2018, Stefanos released the double-album, "I Should Like to Relate This Memory" including songs and orchestral arrangments inspired on Constantine P. Cavafy's poems.

== Discography ==
- 1987 – Το Μαγικό Κλειδί
- 1988 – Λες Κι Είσαι Νύχτα
- 1989 – Πίπερο
- 1991 – Γι' Αυτό Σου Λέω Πάμε (Ζωντανή Ηχογράφηση Από Το Taboo)
- 1991 – Οι Μέρες Της Φωτιάς
- 1992 – Με Τη Φωνή Του Φεγγαριού
- 1993 – Εφ' Όλης Της Ύλης
- 1994 – Χαμένες Ατλαντίδες
- 1995 – Έχω Μια Διαίσθηση
- 1996 – Ξέσπασα...
- 1997 – Ανοιχτές Σελίδες
