= Ola Sta Katalogizo =

"Ola Sta Katalogizo Όλα Στα Καταλογίζω"
- International digital single artwork

Single by Katy Garbi and Thodoris Ferris
- Released: 4 July 2022
- Genre: Laika, pop
- Length: 3:09
- Label: Panik Records; Panik Platinum
- Songwriter(s): Phoebus
- Producer(s): Panagiotis Brakoulias

Katy Garbi singles chronology
"Tryferotita" (2022)	"Ola Sta Katalogizo; Όλα Στα Καταλογίζω" (2022)

Thodoris Ferris singles chronology
"Ftaio Kai Ego" (2022)	"Ola Sta Katalogizo" (2022)

"Ola Sta Katalogizo" (Greek: Όλα Στα Καταλογίζω, transl. I Blame You For Everything) is a song recorded by Greek singers Katy Garbi and Thodoris Ferris. It was released on digital platforms on 4 July 2022 by Panik Platinum, a sub-label of Panik Records, as the fifth single from her upcoming twenty-first studio album.

"Ola Sta Katalogizo" is a remake of the track written and produced by Phoebus contained on Garbi's 1997 album Evaisthisies. The track was re-recorded as a duet between Garbi and Ferris, who first performed the track live on 22 June 2022, at the "MAD Video Music Awards 2022".

A lyric video of the single was released by Panik Records on 5 July 2022.

== Background ==
In April 2020, record label Panik Records released details of Garbi's upcoming discographic project, which would contain duets and collaborations between Garbi and various well known male singers covering some of her most well-known songs written by Phoebus. These details were publicised in a media release, timed to coincide with the precursor single of the album "Kivotos", a duet with Antonis Remos. A further three tracks were released, including "I Patrida Mou" with Melisses contained on the band's album "Duets", and the singles "Atofio Hrisafi" with Dionysis Schinas and "Tryferotita" with Yannis Ploutarchos.

On 18 June 2022, the music website MAD TV Greece announced the live performer lineup for MAD Video Music Awards 2022 indicating Garbi would be performing at the event. On 20 June, MAD TV Greece published a photo of Garbi and Ferris rehearsing for the event, revealing for the first time the two would be performing together.

== Release history ==
Region	Date	Format	Label	Ref.
Greece	4 July 2022	Airplay	Panik Platinum	
International	4 July 2022	Digital download; streaming	Panik Platinum	
