= Tryferotita =

"Tryferotita Τρυφερότητα"
- International digital single artwork

Single by Katy Garbi and Yannis Ploutarchos
- Released: 1 March 2022
- Genre: Laika, pop
- Length: 4:12
- Label: Panik Records; Panik Platinum
- Songwriter: Phoebus
- Producer: Phoebus

Katy Garbi singles chronology
"Ama Figo" (2021)	"Tryferotita; Τρυφερότητα" (2022)	"Ola Sta Katalogizo" (2022)

Yannis Ploutarchos singles chronology
"Tha Se Nikiso" (2021)	"Tryferotita" (2022)	"Pos Tin Eheis Dei" (2022)

"Tryferotita" (Greek: Τρυφερότητα, transl. Tenderness) is a song recorded by Greek singers Katy Garbi and Giannis Ploutarhos. It was released on digital platforms on 11 March 2022 by Panik Platinum, a sub-label of Panik Records, as the fourth single from her upcoming twenty-first studio album.

"Tryferotita" is a remake of the track written and produced by Phoebus contained on Garbi's 1997 album Evaisthisies. The track was re-recorded as a duet between Garbi and Ploutarhos, who appeared together as judges on the music show "House of Fame" on Skai TV. The single received moderate success, reaching number 12 on the Top 20 Greek Official IFPI Airplay Chart.

A lyric video of the single was released by Panik Records on 17 March 2022. The video ends with a line from the 1957 poem "Symphony #1" by award-winning poet Tasos Leivaditis, which speaks of the meaning and value of coexistence between people.

== Release history ==
Region	Date	Format	Label	Ref.
Greece	11 March 2022	Airplay	Panik Platinum	
International	11 March 2022	Digital download; streaming	Panik Platinum	

== Charts ==
"Tryferotita" debuted on the Cyprus Top 20 Combined Airplay Chart at number 19 upon its release, peaking at number 11 and remaining in the Top 20 for eight weeks. The single debuted on the Top 20 Greek Official IFPI Airplay Chart at number 17, remaining in the Top 20 for 10 weeks, peaking at number 12. It entered the Top 20 Combined Official IFPI Airplay Chart and peaked at number 17, remaining in the Top 20 for four weeks.

=== Weekly charts ===
Chart	Peak position
Cyprus Official Top 20	11
Greece Top 20 Combined	17
Greece Top 20 Greek Songs	12
