= S' Opoion Areso =

Single by Katy Garbi featuring Phoebus

"S' Opoion Areso Σ’ Όποιον Αρέσω"

Single by Katy Garbi
- Released: 2 October 2020
- Studio: ERA Studio
- Genre: Laika, pop
- Length: 2:56
- Label: Panik Records; Panik Platinum
- Songwriter: Phoebus
- Producer: Phoebus

Katy Garbi singles chronology
"Kivotos (2020 Version)" (2020)	"S' Opoion Areso; Σ’ Όποιον Αρέσω" (2020)	"Atofio Hrisafi" (2021)

Music video
- "S' Opoion Areso" on YouTube

"S' Opoion Areso" (Greek: Σ’ Όποιον Αρέσω, transl. Whoever I Like) is a song by Greek singer Katy Garbi featuring Phoebus. It was released on digital platforms on 2 October 2020 by Panik Platinum, a sub-label of Panik Records, as the fourth single from her upcoming twenty-first studio album.

The music video of "S' Opoion Areso" directed by George Gavalos, premiered on 15 October 2020. The video is themed on embracing differences.

== Credits and personnel ==
Credits adapted from YouTube.

- Katy Garbi – lead vocals and backing vocals
- Phoebus and Vasilis Nikolopoulos – programming and composition
- Giorgos Hatzopoulos – guitar
- Giorgos Roilos – percussion
- Thanasis Petrelis – Irban, Tziran, Taar, Dobra
- Akis Deiximos – backing vocals
- Haris Galanis, Savvas Galanis, Akis Deiximos, Fotis Papazisis, Chrysa Pandeli, Angelina Koutouraki, Christina Ralli – vocals
- Vangelis Siapatis – sound engineering
- Vassilis Nikolopoulos – sound mixing

== Charts ==
"S' Opoion Areso" debuted on the Cyprus Top 20 Combined Airplay Chart at number 20 upon its release, peaking at number 11. The single debuted on the Top 20 Greek Official IFPI Airplay Chart at number 20, peaking at number 14.

=== Weekly charts ===
Chart	Peak position
Cyprus Official Top 20	11
Greece Top 20 Greek Songs	14

=== Year-end charts ===
Chart (2020)	Position
Greece Top 200 Airplay (IFPI)	190

== Release history ==
Region	Date	Format	Label	Ref.
International	2 October 2020	Airplay	Panik Platinum	
International	2 October 2020	Digital download; streaming	Panik Platinum	
International	15 October 2020	Music video	Panik Platinum	
