= Kormia Hamena =

"Kormia Hamena Κορμιά Χαμένα"

Single by Katy Garbi
- Released: 15 September 2019
- Studio: ERA Studio
- Genre: Laïko, pop
- Length: 3:32
- Label: Panik Records; Panik Platinum
- Songwriter(s): Phoebus
- Producer(s): Phoebus

Katy Garbi singles chronology
"Tha Melagholiso (Otherview - MAD VMA 2019)" (2019)	"Kormia Hamena; Κορμιά Χαμένα" (2019)	"Kivotos (2020 Version)" (2020)

Music video
- "Kormia Hamena" on YouTube

"Kormia Hamena" (Greek: Κορμιά Χαμένα, transl. Lost Bodies) is a song by Greek singer Katy Garbi. It was released on digital platforms on 15 September 2019 by Panik Platinum, a sub-label of Panik Records, as the second single from her upcoming twenty-first studio album.

"Kormia Hamena" will be one of five new tracks written and produced by Phoebus to feature on the upcoming album, while the remaining five will be new duets of previously recorded songs by Garbi, written by Phoebus.

A music video of the single directed by George Gavalos premiered on 8 November 2019.

== Credits and personnel ==
Credits adapted from YouTube.

- Katy Garbi – lead vocals and backing vocals
- Phoebus – executive production, orchestration, programming, drums, percussion
- Giorgos Hatzopoulos – Guitars (electric, acoustic, 12-string)
- Stavros Papagiannakopoulos – Dobra, Tziran, Tar, Bouzouki
- Giorgos Roilos – percussion
- Akis Deiximos – backing vocals
- Akis Deiximos, Savvas Galanis, Haris Galanis, Fotis Papazisis, Christina Ralli, Chrysa Bandelis, Angelina Koutsourakis – vocals
- Vassilis Nikolopoulos – mixing
- Vangelis Siapatis – sound engineering, computer editing
- Paul Stefanidis – mastering

== Release history ==
Region	Date	Format	Label	Ref.
International	15 September 2019	Airplay	Panik Platinum	
International	15 September 2019	Digital download; streaming	Panik Platinum	
International	8 November 2019	Music video	Panik Platinum	

== Charts ==
"Kormia Hamena" debuted on the Cyprus Top 20 Combined Airplay Chart at number 15 upon its release, peaking at number 7 and remaining in the Top 20 for five weeks. The single debuted on the Top 20 Greek Official IFPI Airplay Chart at number 20, remaining in the Top 20 for 29 weeks, peaking at number 5. It entered the Top 20 Combined Official IFPI Airplay Chart at number 16, remaining in the Top 20 for 23 weeks, peaking at number 8.

=== Weekly charts ===
Chart	Peak position
Cyprus Official Top 20	7
Greece Top 20 Combined	8
Greece Top 20 Greek Songs	5
Greece Digital Song Sales	2

=== Year-end charts ===
Chart (2019)	Position
Greece Top 200 Airplay (IFPI)	170

Chart (2020)	Position
Greece Top 200 Airplay (IFPI)	34
