= Tha Melagholiso (OtherView Remix - MAD VMA 2019) =

"Tha Melagholiso (OtherView Remix - MAD VMA 2019) Θα Μελαγχολήσω"

Single by Katy Garbi ft. Alcatrash

from the album Arhizo Polemo (Original Version)
- Released: 10 July 2019
- Genre: Laika, pop
- Length: 3:44
- Label: Panik Records; Panik Platinum
- Songwriter(s): Phoebus
- Producer(s): Phoebus

Katy Garbi minor singles chronology
"Ilios Den Vgeni An Den Peis Kalimera" (2019)	"Tha Melagholiso (OtherView Remix - MAD VMA 2019); Θα Μελαγχολήσω" (2019)	"Kormia Hamena" (2019)

"Tha Melagholiso (OtherView Remix - MAD VMA 2019)" (Greek: Θα Μελαγχολήσω (OtherView Remix - MAD VMA 2019), transl. I Will Be Sad) is a song by Greek singer Katy Garbi featuring the band Alcatrash. It was performed at the MAD VMA 2019 on 27 June 2019 and released on digital platforms on 10 July 2019 by Panik Platinum, a sub-label of Panik Records.

"Tha Melagholiso (OtherView Remix - MAD VMA 2019)" is a remix of Garbi's 1996 hit written by Phoebus, "Tha Melagholiso" from 2× platinum album Arhizo Polemo, performed as a duet with Alcatrash.

The MAD VMA 2019 performance of the single premiered on 7 July 2019, prior to its digital release.

== Background ==
"Tha Melaholiso" was first released in 1996 by Sony Music on Garbi's album Arhizo Polemo and became one of the most iconic songs of the 1990s.

The song was written and produced by Phoebus, an emerging songwriter who had made his songwriting debut in 1992, and subsequently found success as a songwriter included on Garbi's 1993 album Os Ton Paradeiso.

By 1996 Phoebus and Garbi's collaboration had resulted in a gold and platinum album certification. Their third album collaboration spawned various original concepts not seen in the commercial Greek records of that period in time; this included a song in the style of a hasapiko featuring a bridge-chorus format ("Hamena") and the song "Tha Melagholiso" which featured a two-part chorus.

The laïko style track "Tha Melagholiso" written by Phoebus, featured a unique dual chorus which until that point had not been a feature of any song of the Greek music industry. The first chorus begins with 'Tha melagholiso, ki'istera ego ki'istera ego pos tha sinehiso... (Greek: Θα μελαγχολήσω κι ύστερα εγώ, κι ύστερα εγώ πως θα συνεχίσω...),' while the second begins with 'Kita me pou kleo san paidi ki etia agapi mou eisai esi...(Greek: Κοίτα με που κλαίω σαν παιδί κι η αιτία αγάπη μου είσαι εσύ...)'

== Charts ==
"Tha Melagholiso (OtherView Remix - MAD VMA 2019)" debuted on the Top 20 Greek Official IFPI Airplay Chart at number 19 and peaked at 9.

=== Weekly charts ===
Chart	Peak position
Greece Top 20 Greek Songs	9

=== Year-end charts ===
Chart (2019)	Position
Greece Top 200 Airplay (IFPI)	102

Chart (2020)	Position
Greece Top 200 Airplay (IFPI)	103

== Certifications ==
Region	Certification	Certified units/sales
Greece (IFPI Greece)	Gold	1,000,000^{†}
^{†} Streaming-only figures based on certification alone.

== Release history ==
Region	Date	Format	Label	Ref.
Various	6 July 2019	Music video	Panik Platinum	
Various	10 July 2019	Digital download; streaming	Panik Platinum	
Various	10 July 2019	Airplay	Panik Platinum	
