= Ilios De Vgeni An Den Peis Kalimera =

"Ilios De Vgeni An Den Peis Kalimera Ήλιος Δε Βγαίνει Αν Δεν Πεις Καλημέρα"

Single by Katy Garbi
- Released: 6 February 2019
- Recorded: 2018
- Genre: Laika, pop
- Label: Panik Records; Panik Platinum
- Songwriter: Phoebus
- Producer: Phoebus

Katy Garbi singles chronology
| "Mia Kyria" (2018) | "Ilios De Vgeni An Den Peis Kalimera; Ήλιος Δε Βγαίνει Αν Δεν Πεις Καλημέρα" (2019) | "Tha Melagholiso (Otherview - MAD VMA 2019)" (2019) |

"Ilios De Vgeni An Den Peis Kalimera" (Greek: Ήλιος Δε Βγαίνει Αν Δεν Πεις Καλημέρα, transl. The Sun Does Not Rise Unless You Say Good Morning) is a song by Greek singer Katy Garbi. It was released on digital platforms on 6 February 2019 by Panik Platinum, a sub-label of Panik Records, as the lead single from her upcoming twenty-first studio album. Written and produced by Phoebus, "Ilios De Vgeni An Den Peis Kalimera” was the singer's first material written by Phoebus since 2000's multi-platinum album To Kati, composed entirely by the well-known composer. It was released to mark thirty years of Garbi’s professional music career, which began in 1989 with the release of Garbi’s debut album Prova.

== Background ==
In late March 2018, Garbi took part in a radio interview with London Greek Radio while promoting her 2017 album, Spase Tous Deiktes. During the interview Garbi disclosed that she had recorded a duet with husband Dionysis Schinas, written by songwriter, Phoebus as part of his recent collaborations with Schinas. Phoebus was a primary songwriter for Garbi between 1993 and 2000, in which their collaboration resulted in commercial success across five studio albums spawning several chart hits.

In early November 2018, Schinas published an instastory image of Garbi and Phoebus recording in a studio with the caption "I can’t believe I’m reliving this!". In December, Garbi posted an image of herself to her instastory with the caption "coming soon!". The image depicted Garbi on location at the filming of the music video that would accompany the first single of the album.

On 10 January 2019, music news websites began reporting on the re-collaboration of Garbi and Phoebus and the upcoming release of an upbeat track with a "fresh" sound penned by the songwriter. On 22 January 2019 Garbi’s official fanclub, Garbofans, and Pheobus' official fanclub held a competition in which five social media users would be chosen to attend the songwriter’s studio and listen to the new track before its public release.

Rythmos Radio 94,9 announced exclusivity of the track's radio premiere, adding that it will debut on 30 January as part of a special interview called 'Nihta". Garbi along with her band would perform live on air for the listeners and answer questions from the radio hosts. To media surprise, Phoebus was announced as a guest of this radio interview, a rarity as Phoebus frequently chooses not to take part in media interviews. Panik Platinum later published the cover art of the new single along with a short audio teaser of the track.

== Release history ==
| Region | Date | Format | Label | Ref. |
|---|---|---|---|---|
| Greece | 31 January 2019 | Airplay | Panik Platinum | |
| International | 6 February 2019 | Digital download; streaming | Panik Platinum | |
| International | 6 February 2019 | Music video | Panik Platinum | |

== Charts ==
"Ilios De Vgeni An Den Peis Kalimera" debuted on the Cyprus Top 20 Combined Airplay Chart at number 20 upon its release, peaking at number 15 and remaining in the Top 20 for four weeks. Top 20 Combined Official IFPI Airplay Chart at number 145 upon its release. In its first full week of airplay it climbed 125 spots, entering the "Top 20 - Combined" at number twenty. On the Top 20 Greek Official IFPI Airplay Chart it entered the "Top 20 - Greek" at number 16 in its first full airplay week. The single debuted at number four on the IFPI Digital Singles chart in the sixth week of 2019, based on digital sales.

=== Weekly charts ===
| Chart | Peak position |
|---|---|
| Cyprus Official Top 20 | 15 |
| Greece Top 20 Combined | 11 |
| Greece Top 20 Greek Songs | 9 |
| Greece Digital Singles (Local) | 4 |

=== Year-end charts ===
| Chart (2019) | Position |
|---|---|
| Greece Top 200 Airplay (IFPI) | 78 |
