= Atofio Hrisafi =

"Atofio Hrisafi" "Ατόφιο Χρυσάφι"

Single by Katy Garbi with Dionisis Shinas
- Released: 8 March 2021
- Genre: Laïko, pop
- Length: 3:08
- Label: Panik Records; Panik Platinum
- Songwriter: Phoebus
- Producer: Phoebus

Katy Garbi with Dionisis Shinas singles chronology
"S' Opoion Areso" (2020)	"Atofio Hrisafi" "Ατόφιο Χρυσάφι" (2021)	"Ama Figo" (2021)

Music video
- "Atofio Hrisafi" on YouTube

"Atofio Hrisafi" (Greek: Ατόφιο Χρυσάφι, transl. Pure Gold) is a song by Greek singer Katy Garbi and Dionisis Shinas. It was released on digital platforms on 8 March 2021 by Panik Platinum, a sub-label of Panik Records, as the fifth single from Garbi's upcoming twenty-first studio album.

"Atofio Hrisafi" is a cover of the track written and produced by Phoebus contained on Garbi's 1994 album Atofio Hrisafi. The track was re-recorded as a duet between Garbi and Shinas and remixed by Kostas Lainas. The single reached number 1 on the Top 20 Greek Official IFPI Airplay Chart.

A lyric video containing images of Garbi and Shinas together was released on 17 March 2021.

== Release history ==
Region	Date	Format	Label	Ref.
International	8 March 2021	Airplay	Panik Platinum	
International	8 March 2021	Digital download; streaming	Panik Platinum	
International	17 March 2021	Music video	Panik Platinum	

== Awards ==
"Atofio Hrisafi" was nominated for Single of the Year in 2021 at the Super Music Awards (Cyprus), resulting in no win.

Year	Event	Nominee/Work	Award	Result
2021	Super Music Awards	"Atofio Hrisafi" - Katy Garbi and Dionisis Shinas	Single of the Year	Nominated

== Charts ==
"Atofio Hrisafi" debuted on the Cyprus Top 20 Combined Airplay Chart at number 20 upon its release, peaking at number 1 for three consecutive weeks and remaining in the Top 20 for 21 weeks. The single debuted on the Top 20 Greek Official IFPI Airplay Chart at number 16, peaking at number 1, remaining in the Top 20 for 26 weeks.

=== Weekly charts ===
Chart	Peak position
Cyprus Official Top 20	1
Greece Top 20 Greek Songs	1

=== Year-end charts ===
Chart (2021)	Position
Greece Top 200 Airplay (IFPI)	18
