= Kivotos (song) =

2020 single by Katy Garbi and Antonis Remos

"Kivotos (2020 Version)"

Single by Katy Garbi featuring Antonis Remos
- Released: 27 April 2020
- Studio: ERA Studio
- Genre: Laika, pop
- Length: 4:05
- Label: Panik
- Songwriter: Phoebus
- Producer: Phoebus

Katy Garbi singles chronology
"Kormia Hamena" (2019)	"Kivotos (2020 Version)" (2020)	"S' Opoion Areso" (2020)

Music video
- "Kivotos (2020 Version)" on YouTube

"Kivotos (2020 Version)" (Greek: Κίβωτος, transl. Ark) is a song by Greek singer Katy Garbi featuring Antonis Remos. It was released on digital platforms on 27 April 2020 by Panik Platinum, a sub-label of Panik Records, as the fourth single from her upcoming twenty-first studio album. "Kivotos (2020 Version)" will be one of five new duets of previously recorded songs by Garbi written and produced by Phoebus to be featured on the upcoming album. To promote the song, Garbi released a music video in conjunction with Kivotos tou Kosmou (transl. Ark of the World), a non-profit charity organisation supporting special care and protection of "mother and child". All proceeds from the sale of the single are donated to Kivotos tou Kosmou.

== Background and composition ==
"Kivotos" was written by Phoebus and first included on Garbi's eighth studio album Evaisthisies, released in 1997. The album was one of the largest commercial successes of the 1990s, with nine of the twelve tracks (including "Kivotos") becoming singles. On 10 January 2019, music news websites began reporting on the re-collaboration of Garbi and Phoebus and the release of an upbeat track with a "fresh" sound penned by the songwriter. On 22 January 2019, Garbi’s official fanclub, Garbofans, and Pheobus' official fanclub held a competition in which five social media users would be chosen to attend the songwriter's studio and listen to the new track before its public release. On 30 January 2019, Garbi and Phoebus appeared on Rythmos Radio 94,9, announcing during the interview that they would be recording a full album together, which would incorporate five new songs and five previously released tracks performed as duets. One of those songs was an updated version of "Kivotos", which was released for airplay and streaming on 27 April 2020.

== Music video and promotion ==
On 8 April 2020, Panik Platinum posted a video of Garbi on their Instagram account, asking fans to send in photos symbolising their relationship with their parents. The photos would be featured in the music video for "Kivotos (2020 Version)", promoting the non-profit charity Kivotos tou Kosmou (transl. Ark of the World) in their campaign for the special care and protection of mothers and children. The music video was released on 28 April 2020.

== Credits and personnel ==
Credits adapted from YouTube.

- Katy Garbi and Antonis Remos – lead vocals and backing vocals
- Phoebus – executive production
- Akis Deiximos – backing vocals
- Vassilis Nikolopoulos – additional recordings; mixing
- Panagiotis Brakoulias – mastering

== Release history ==
Region	Date	Format	Label	Ref.
Various	27 April 2020	Airplay; Digital download; streaming	Panik Platinum	

== Awards ==
Kivotos was nominated for Song of the Year in 2021 at the MAD Video Music Awards (Greece), resulting in no win.

Year	Event	Nominee/Work	Award	Result
2021	MAD Video Music Awards	"Kivotos" - Katy Garbi and Antonis Remos	Song of the Year	Nominated

== Charts ==
"Kivotos (2020 Version)" debuted on Cyprus Official Top 20 at number 12 after release, peaking at top position in mid-June. The single debuted on the Top 20 Greek Official IFPI Airplay Chart at number 18 mid-May 2020, peaking at number 3 and remaining on the chart for four weeks. The single debuted at number 89 on the IFPI Digital Singles chart in the nineteenth week of 2020, peaking at 39, based on digital sales.

=== Weekly charts ===
Chart	Peak position
Cyprus Official Top 20	1
Greece Top 20 Combined	9
Greece Top 20 Greek Songs	3
Greece Digital Song Sales	39

=== Year-end charts ===
Chart (2020)	Position
Greece Top 200 Airplay (IFPI)	27

Chart (2021)	Position
Greece Top 200 Airplay (IFPI)	123
