= Ama Figo =

"Ama Figo Άμα Φύγω"

Single by Katy Garbi
- Released: 8 November 2021
- Genre: Laika, pop
- Length: 3:28
- Label: Panik Records; Panik Platinum
- Songwriter: Phoebus
- Producer: Phoebus

Katy Garbi singles chronology
"Atofio Hrisafi" (2021)	"Ama Figo; Άμα Φύγω" (2021)	"Tryferotita" (2022)

Music video
- "Ama Figo" on YouTube

"Ama Figo" (Greek: Άμα Φύγω, transl. If I Leave) is a song by Greek singer Katy Garbi. Written and produced by Phoebus, "Ama Figo” was released on digital platforms on 8 November 2021 by Panik Platinum, a sub-label of Panik Records, as the sixth single from Garbi's twenty-first studio album.

== Music video ==
The music video for the "Ama Figo" was directed by Alex Konstantinidis and premiered on 8 November 2021, the same day as the single's release. The concept of the music video is centred on female empowerment, depicted by scenes of a toxic relationship in which the female decides for it to end. At 2:32, the track is paused and interrupted by Garbi's voice reciting the following lines: "We women are strong. And whenever necessary we know how to fight to protect what we love. We love our partner. We appreciate and respect them. That is why we want them to love us, to respect us and to appreciate us the same. We want them to stand by us. Neither to overtake us, nor to follow us. Otherwise, we leave, and move forward on our own. We are not afraid, because we are strong." The spoken work by Garbi is accompanied by a freeze frame from the music video and lasts for 34 seconds.

== Release history ==
Region	Date	Format	Label	Ref.
Greece	8 November 2021	Airplay	Panik Platinum	
International	8 November 2021	Digital download; streaming	Panik Platinum	
International	8 November 2021	Music video	Panik Platinum	

== Charts ==
"Ama Figo" debuted on the Cyprus Top 20 Combined Airplay Chart at number 20 upon its release and peaked at number 15.

=== Weekly charts ===
Chart	Peak position
Cyprus Official Top 20	15
