= Billboard Greek Airplay =

Singles popularity chart

The Billboard Greek Airplay is the Greek music industry standard singles popularity chart issued weekly by Billboard Greece. It is powered by Media Inspector and IFPI Greece ever since March 2011. Media Inspector monitors a total of 150 radio stations around Greece, and compiles a combined repertoire Top 200 airplay chart, though it is not publicly accessible. A new chart is compiled and officially released to the public by Billboard Greece on Monday.

The first number-one song on this chart was "Loca" by Shakira on the issue dated March 12, 2011.
