= Ivi Adamou discography =

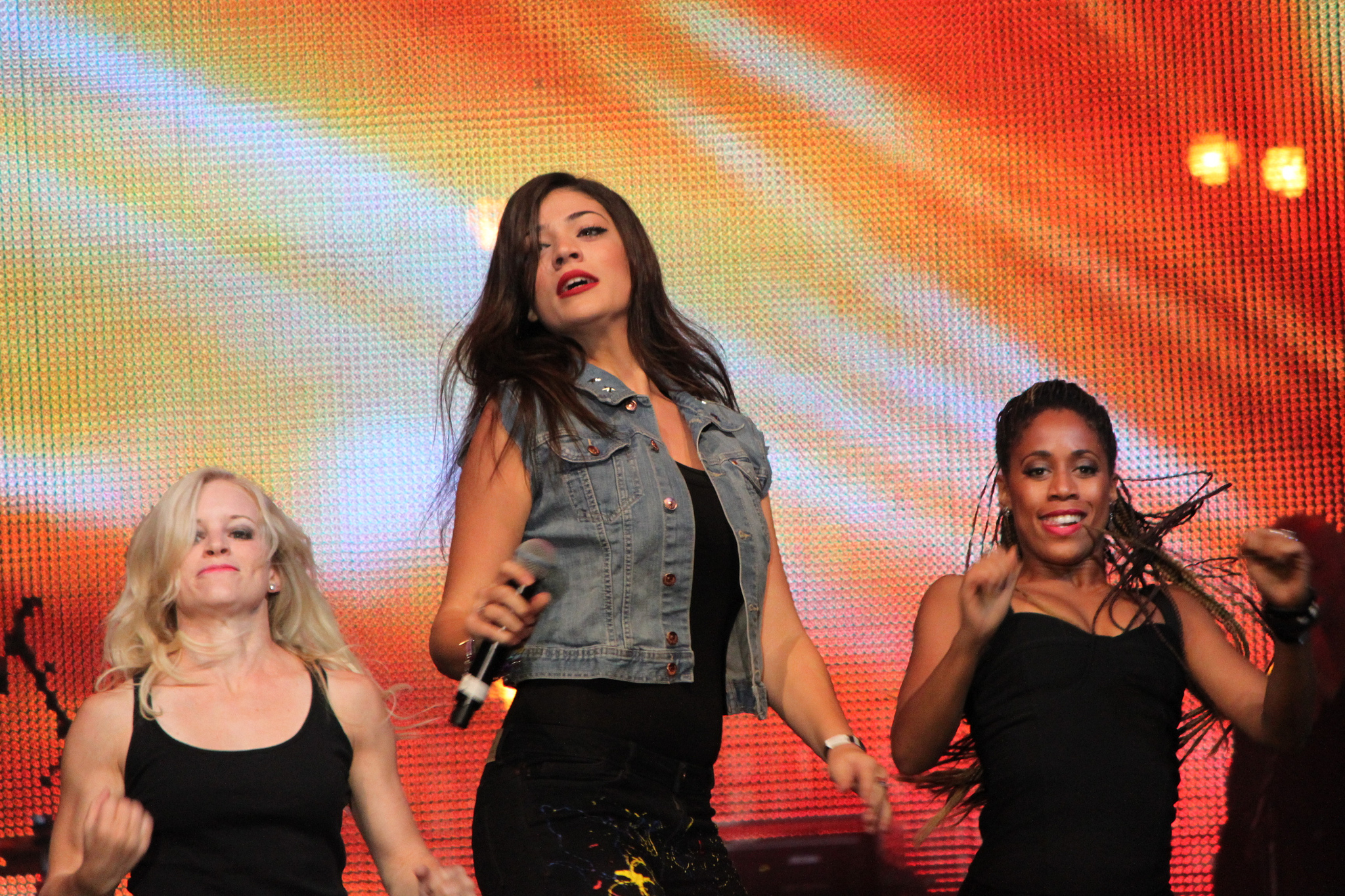
- Ivi Adamou at Stockholm Pride in 2012
- Studio albums: 1
- Extended plays: 2
- Singles: 15
- Music videos: 25
- Featured singles: 5

Greek Cypriot singer Ivi Adamou has released two studio albums, two extended plays and 15 singles. Ivi secured a recording contract with Sony Music Greece and released her debut extended play, Kalokairi Stin Kardia, which was certified gold. In the same year she collaborated with the Spiros Lambrou Choir and released the holiday EP Christougenna Me Tin Ivi Adamou, released as Christmas with Ivi Adamou abroad.

After her success with the Eurovision song "La La Love" in Cyprus, Greece, Sweden, and Spain, she is preparing a new album including a new single with the Spanish DJ Marsal Ventura, "Time to Love" and "Ase Me". Ivi had a second collaboration with Stavento with the song "Na Sou Tragoudo" since their first collaboration with "San Erthi I Mera" became a big hit in Greece and Cyprus.

== Albums ==
=== Studio albums ===
Title	Album details	Peak chart positions
Title	Album details	GRE
San Ena Oniro	Released: 22 July 2011; Label: Sony Music Greece/Day 1; Formats: CD, CD/DVD, Digital Download	17
Diko Mou	Released: 28 November 2022; Label: Panik Records	To be released

=== EPs ===
Title	EPs details	Sales	Certifications (sales thresholds)
Kalokairi Stin Kardia	Released: 14 June 2010; Label: Sony Music Greece/Day 1; Formats: CD, Digital Download	GR: 6,000	GR: Gold
Christmas with Ivi Adamou	Released: 22 November 2010; Label: Sony Music Greece/Day 1; Formats: CD, Digital Download	PT: 15,000	PT: 3× Platinum

== Singles ==
=== As lead artist ===
Title	Year	Peak chart positions										Album
Title	Year	GRE	AUT	DEN	GER	IRE	NOR	SWE	SWI	UK	ESP	Album
"A*G*A*P*I"	2010	10	—	—	—	—	—	—	—	—	—	Kalokairi Stin Kardia
"Sose Me"	2010	—	—	—	—	—	—	—	—	—	—	Kalokairi Stin Kardia
"To Mistiko Mou Na Vris"	2010	—	—	—	—	—	—	—	—	—	—	Kalokairi Stin Kardia
"Krata Ta Matia Sou Klista" (with Melisses)	2011	3	—	—	—	—	—	—	—	—	—	San Ena Oniro
"Kano Mia Efhi" (featuring Daddy Nek)	2011	—	—	—	—	—	—	—	—	—	—	San Ena Oniro
"Voltes St Asteria"	2011	—	—	—	—	—	—	—	—	—	—	San Ena Oniro
"La La Love"	2012	2	47	38	43	32	16	4	66	77	45	San Ena Oniro
"Madness" (featuring tU)	2012	—	—	—	—	—	—	—	—	—	—	Non-album singles
"Ase Me" (featuring Kleopatra)	2012	10	—	—	—	—	—	—	—	—	—	Non-album singles
"Ponane Oi Agapes"	2013	—	—	—	—	—	—	—	—	—	—	Non-album singles
"Tipota De Mas Stamata"	2016	7	—	—	—	—	—	—	—	—	—	Non-album singles
"Akou Sopa"	2016	—	—	—	—	—	—	—	—	—	—	Diko Mou
"Afto Ton Kero"	2017	—	—	—	—	—	—	—	—	—	—	Diko Mou
"Pame Ke Mi Rotas"	2018	—	—	—	—	—	—	—	—	—	—	Diko Mou
"Diko Mou" (featuring Stavento)	2018	8	—	—	—	—	—	—	—	—	—	Diko Mou
"Pao" (featuring Konnie Metaxa)	2019	—	—	—	—	—	—	—	—	—	—	Diko Mou
"Fotia Mou" (featuring Giorgos Mazonakis)	2020	96	—	—	—	—	—	—	—	—	—	Diko Mou
"Gia Sena" (with Stavento)	2021	12	—	—	—	—	—	—	—	—	—	Diko Mou
"Agoraki Mou"	2022	—	—	—	—	—	—	—	—	—	—	Diko Mou
"Rikse Me"	2022	—	—	—	—	—	—	—	—	—	—	Diko Mou
"Sto Giatro" (with Stavento)	2023	—	—	—	—	—	—	—	—	—	—	
"—" denotes a recording that did not chart or was not released.

=== As featured artist ===
Title	Year	Peak chart positions	Album
Title	Year	GRE	Album
"San Erthi I Mera" (Stavento featuring Ivi Adamou)	2010	1	Mia fora kai enan kairo
"Avra" (Pink Noisy featuring Ivi Adamou)	2012	—	Non-album singles
"Time to Love" (Marsal Ventura featuring Ivi Adamou)	2013	—	Non-album singles
"Na Sou Tragoudo" (Stavento featuring Ivi Adamou)	2013	6	Stin akri tou kosmou
"Mi Staksi Ke Mi Vrexi" (Stavento featuring Ivi Adamou)	2017	—	Akoma Onirevome
"Emeis" (Stelios Rokkos featuring Ivi Adamou)	2022	—	Anasa
"—" denotes a recording that did not chart or was not released.

== Music videos ==
List of music videos, showing year released and directors
Title	Year	Other artist(s)	Director(s)	Ref.
"I Vasilissa Ton Okeanon"	2010	None	—N/a	
"A*G*A*P*I"	2010	None	The hitScox	
"San Erthi I Mera"	2010	Stavento	Konstantinos Rigos	
"Sose Me"	2010	None	ArtCut	
"To Mistiko Mou Na Vris"	2010	None	ArtCut	
"I Vasilissa Tis Modas"	2010	None	Manolis Jirakis	
"Krata Ta Matia Sou Klista"	2011	Melisses	Konstantinos Rigos	
"San Ena Oniro"	2011	Giorgos Papadimitrakis	—N/a	
"Kano Mia Efhi"	2011	Daddy Nek	White Room	
"Voltes St Asteria"	2011	None	Alexandros Grammatopoulos	
"La La Love" (Promo Video)	2012	None	Maria Hari	
"You Don't Belong Here" (Promo Video)	2012	None	Maria Hari	
"Call the Police" (Promo Video)	2012	None	Maria Hari	
"La La Love"	2012	None	Apollonas Papatheoharis	
"Madness"	2012	tU	—N/a	
"Ase Me"	2012	Kleopatra	Serif Francis	
"Na Sou Tragoudo"	2013	Stavento	—N/a	
"Ponane Oi Agapes"	2013	None	Alexandros Grammatopoulos	
"Tipota De Mas Stamata"	2016	None	Dimitris Sylvestros	
"Akou Sopa"	2016	None	Dimitris Sylvestros	
"Afto Ton Kero"	2017	None	Dimitris Sylvestros	
"Mi Staxi Ke Mi Vrexi"	2017	Stavento	Dimitris Sylvestros	
"Pame Ke Mi Rotas"	2018	None	Giorgos Giannimbas, Carolos Porfyris	
"Diko Mou"	2018	Stavento	George Mpenioudakis	
"Páo"	2019	Konnie Metaxa	Michalis Kouinelis	
"Fotia Mou"	2020	Giorgos Mazonakis	Yiannis Papadakos	
"Gia Sena"	2021	Stavento	Yiannis Papadakos	
"Agoraki Mou"	2022	None	Yiannis Papadakos	
"Rikse Me"	2022	None	Yiannis Papadakos	
"Emeis"	2022	Stelios Rokkos	Danny Darlas	

== See also ==
- Ivi Adamou
- List of songs recorded by Ivi Adamou
