= List of songs recorded by Ivi Adamou =

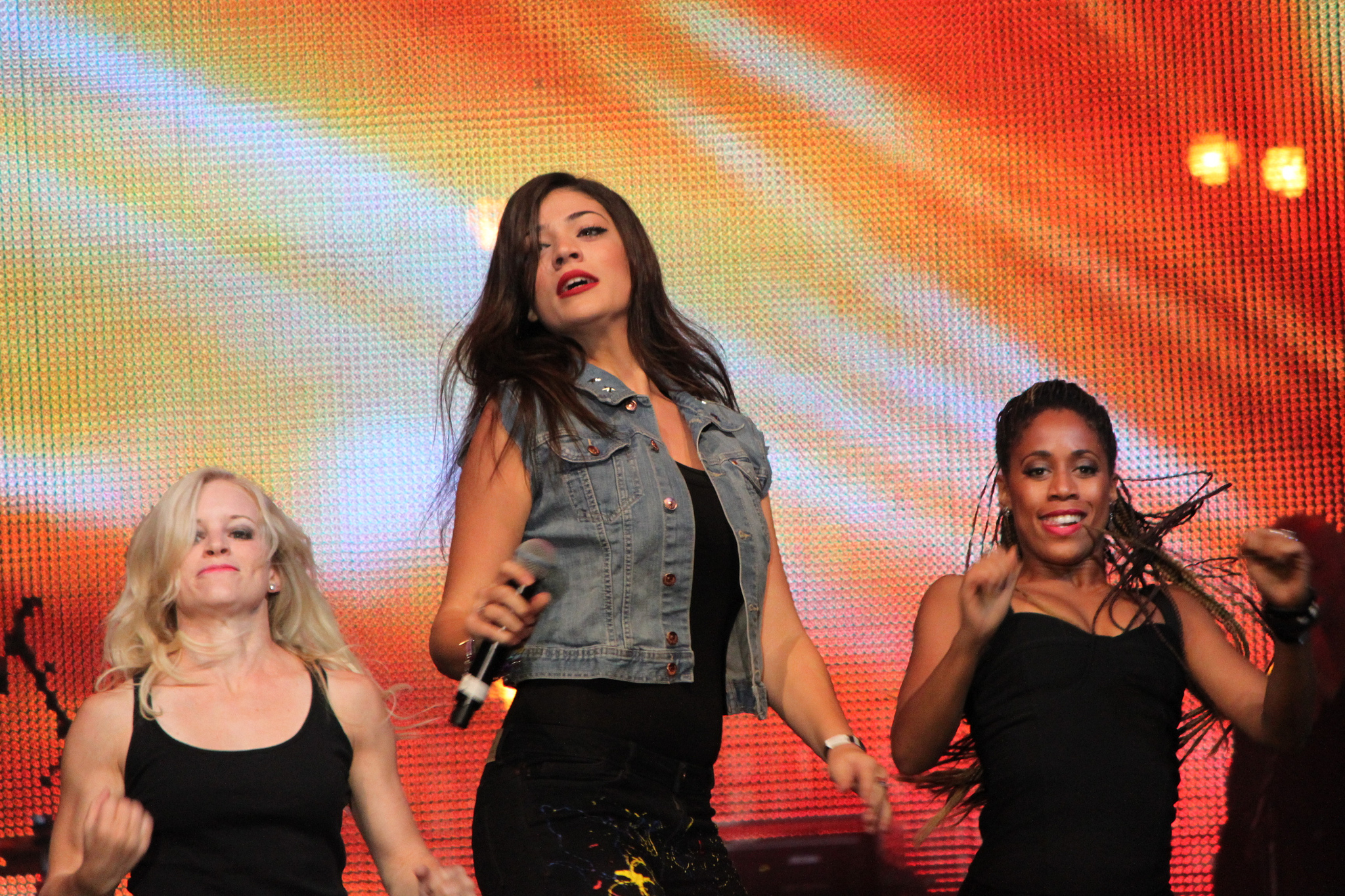
Ivi Adamou at Stockholm Pride in 2012

Greek Cypriot singer Ivi Adamou has released one studio album and two extended plays and has been featured on songs on other artists respective albums.

Adamou's first album, Kalokairi Stin Kardia, was released in 2010 and was an EP that included seven tracks with additionally two karaoke versions and one remix. "A*G*A*P*I", "Sose Me" and "To Mistiko Mou Na Vris" were the singles from the EP. Later, in December 2010, Adamou released a Christmas EP that included four tracks, with "Santa Claus Is Coming to Town" being the only single from it.

Her debut studio album, San Ena Oniro, was released in 2011 and had ten tracks including her collaboration single with Melisses, "Krata Ta Matia Sou Klista". The singles apart from the collaboration single, were "Kano Mia Efhi", "Voltes St Asteria" and "La La Love", with the latter being included in the euro edition of the album.

Apart from album singles, Adamou was featured on three other songs with two of them being with Stavento; "San Erthi I Mera" and "Na Sou Tragoudo". Adamou was also featured on Pink Noisy's "Avra", a re-make of the song "Mestral" by the same artists featuring Radio Killer.

== List ==
Key
†	Indicates single release
•	Indicates English language song
‡	Indicates song written by Adamou

Song	Artist(s)	Writer(s)	Album(s)	Year	Ref.
"A*G*A*P*I" †	Ivi Adamou	Leo "Freakchild" Chantzaras; Keely Hawkes; Bruce Howell; Giannis Doxas	Kalokairi Stin Kardia	2010	
"Afto Ton Kero" †	Ivi Adamou	Michalis Kouinelis	—N/a	2017	
"Agoraki Mou" †	Ivi Adamou	Petros Iakovidis	—N/a	2022	
"Agia Nihta" / "We Wish You a Merry Christmas" •	Ivi Adamou	Kostas Papadimitriou	Christmas with Ivi Adamou	2010	
"Akou Sopa" †	Ivi Adamou	Yerai Jose Blanco Garcia; Sunny Baltzi; Michalis Kouinelis	—N/a	2016	
"Ase Me" †	Ivi Adamou featuring Cleopatra	Michalis Kouinelis; EY.O. Mageda	—N/a	2012	
"Astrapes"	Ivi Adamou	Mikko Tamminen; Nalle Ahlstedt; Michaela Stenström; Faidon Samsidis	San Ena Oniro	2011	
"Avra (Mestral)"	Ivi Adamou featuring Pink Noisy	Pink Noisy; GiorGio Sopidis; Faidon Samsidis	—N/a	2012	
"Call the Police" •	Ivi Adamou	Lene Dissing; Jakob Glæsner; Mikko Tamminen	San Ena Oniro – Euro Edition	2012	
"Crashing Down" •	Ivi Adamou	Leo "Freakchild" Chantzaras; Keely Hawkes; Bruce Howell	Kalokairi Stin Kardia	2010	
"Diko Mou" †	Ivi Adamou featuring Stavento	Michalis Kouinelis	—N/a	2018	
"Dipla Sou"	Ivi Adamou	Konstantinos Fousteris; Michalis Kouinelis; Pantelis Estilianidis	—N/a	2022	
"Emeis" †	Stelios Rokkos featuring Ivi Adamou	Stelios Rokkos	Anasa	2022	
"Fige"	Ivi Adamou	Nalle Ahlstedt; Vagia Kalantzi	San Ena Oniro	2011	
"Fotia Mou" †	Ivi Adamou featuring Giorgos Mazonakis	Michalis Kouinelis	—N/a	2020	
"Fotia Vrohi"	Ivi Adamou	Niklas Jarl; Alexander Schold; Sharon Vaughn; Giannis Doxas	San Ena Oniro – Euro Edition	2012	
"Gelaei"	Ivi Adamou	Jason Gill; Dimitri Stassos; Michaela Stenström; Giannis Doxas	Kalokairi Stin Kardia	2010	
"Gia Sena" †	Stavento & Ivi Adamou	Michalis Kouinelis	—N/a	2021	
"Hameni Agapi"	Ivi Adamou	Mario Panas; Nikos Ellinaios	Kalokairi Stin Kardia	2010	
"Kalokairi Stin Kardia"	Ivi Adamou featuring Sedat	Torsten Abrolat; Terry Bjerry; Fotios Stefos; Vagia Kalatzi	Kalokairi Stin Kardia	2010	
"Kano Mia Efhi" †	Ivi Adamou featuring Daddy Nek	Dimitri Stassos; Michaela Stenström	San Ena Oniro	2011	
"Kati Gia Na Piasto"	Ivi Adamou	Vasilis Gavriilidis; Thanos Papanikolaou	San Ena Oniro	2011	
"Krata Ta Matia Sou Klista" †	Ivi Adamou featuring Melisses	Melisses	San Ena Oniro; Akou	2011	
"La La Love" †	Ivi Adamou	Alex Papaconstantinou; Bjorn Djupstrom; Alexandra Zakka; Viktor Svensson	San Ena Oniro – Euro Edition	2012	
"Last Christmas" •	Ivi Adamou	George Michael	Christmas with Ivi Adamou	2010	
"Madness" †	Ivi Adamou featuring tU	Nalle Ahlstedt; Vagia Kalantzi	—N/a	2012	
"Mi Staksi Ke Mi Vreksi" †	Stavento featuring Ivi Adamou	Michalis Kouinelis	Akoma Onirevome	2016	
"Na Sou Tragoudo" †	Stavento featuring Ivi Adamou	Michalis Kouinelis	Stin Akri Tou Kosmou	2013	
"Pame Ke Mi Rotas" †	Ivi Adamou	Ivi Adamou‡ Michalis Kouinelis	—N/a	2018	
"Páo" †	Ivi Adamou featuring Konnie Metaxa	Michalis Kouinelis	—N/a	2019	
"Ponane Oi Agapes" †	Ivi Adamou	Michalis Kouinelis	—N/a	2013	
"Rikse Me" †	Ivi Adamou	Flori Mumajesi; Michalis Kouinelis	—N/a	2022	
"S' Agapo Ki As Mou Pire Kairo"	Ivi Adamou	Giannis Hristodoulopoulos; Giannis Doxas	San Ena Oniro	2011	
"San Ena Oniro" †	Ivi Adamou featuring Giorgos Papadimitrakis	Robert Williams	San Ena Oniro	2011	
"San Erthi I Mera" †	Ivi Adamou featuring Stavento	Michalis Kouinelis; Mageda	Mia Fora Ki Enan Kero	2010	
"Santa Claus Is Coming to Town" †	Ivi Adamou	John Frederick Coots; Haven Gillespie	Christmas with Ivi Adamou	2010	
"Sose Me" †	Ivi Adamou	Lene Dissing; Hanif Sabzevari; Dimitri Stassos; Marcus Winther-John; Giannis Doxas	Kalokairi Stin Kardia	2010	
"The Queen" •	Ivi Adamou	Dimitri Stassos; Michaela Stenström	San Ena Oniro	2011	
"Time to Love" †	Marsal Ventura featuring Ivi Adamou	Marsal Ventura; Ivan Torrent; Jordi Garrido	—N/a	2013	
"Tis Agapis Ta Thimata"	Ivi Adamou	Darren Hayes; Alan Nglish; Faidon Samsidis	San Ena Oniro	2011	
"Tipota De Mas Stamata" †	Ivi Adamou	Michalis Kouinelis	—N/a	2016	
"To Mistiko Mou Na Vris" †	Ivi Adamou	Adam Baptiste; Alex Papaconstantinou; Giannis Doxas	Kalokairi Stin Kardia	2010	
"Voltes St Asteria" †	Ivi Adamou	Giannis Hristodoulopoulos; Giannis Doxas	San Ena Oniro	2011	
"White Christmas" •	Ivi Adamou	Jason Gill; Dimitri Stassos; Mikaela Stenstrom	Christmas with Ivi Adamou	2010	
"You Don't Belong Here" •	Ivi Adamou	Niklas Jarl; Alexander Schold; Sharon Vaughn	San Ena Oniro – Euro Edition	2012	

== See also ==
- Ivi Adamou
- Ivi Adamou discography
