= List of awards and nominations received by Ivi Adamou =

Ivi Adamou awards and nominations
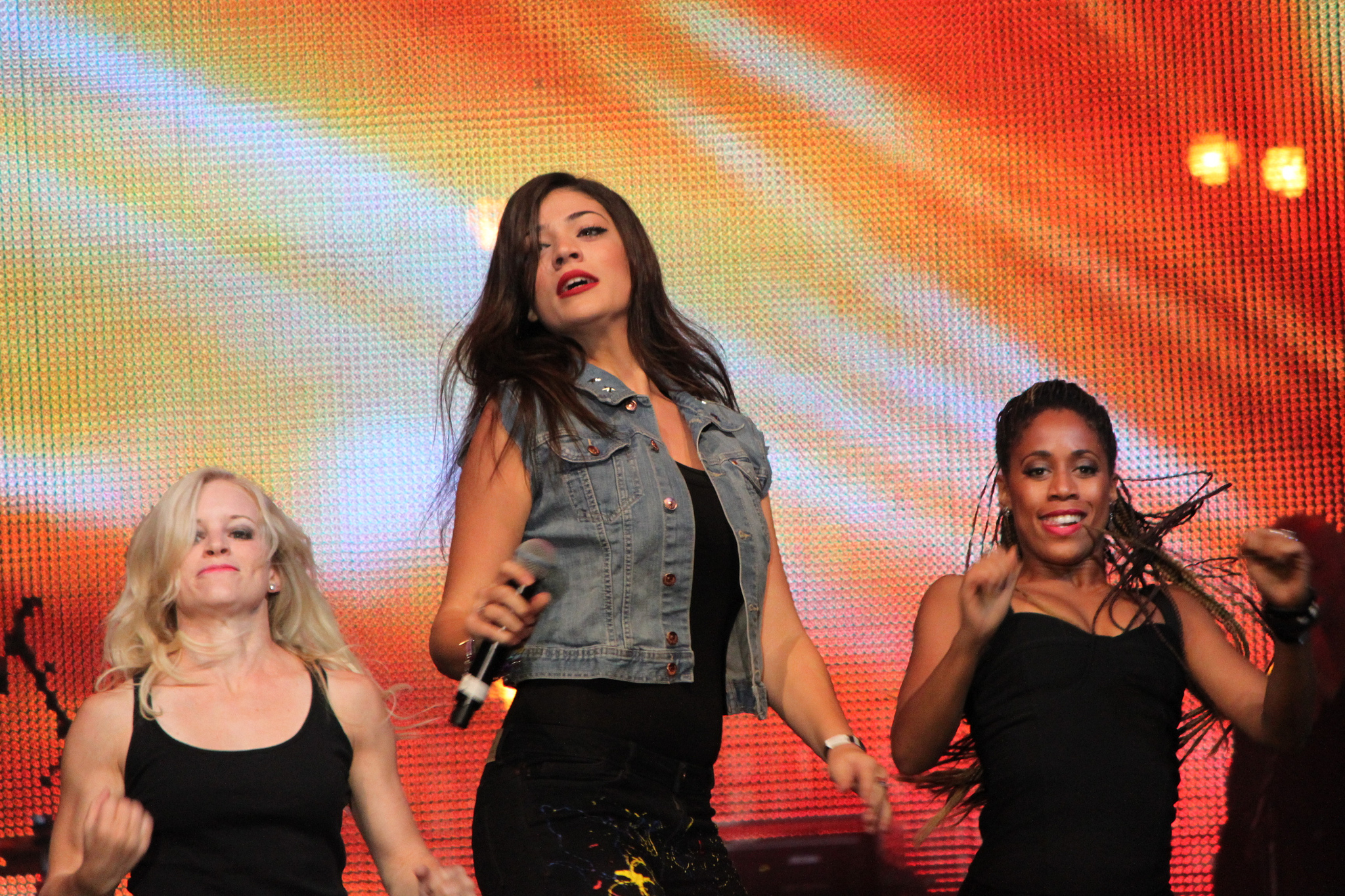
- Ivi Adamou in 2012
Awards and nominations
Award	Wins	Nominations
MAD Video Music Awards	2	10
Madame Figaro Awards	2	3

Totals (Note: Certain award groups do not simply award one winner. They acknowledge several different recipients, have runners-up, and have third place. Since this is a specific recognition and is different from losing an award, runner-up mentions are considered wins in this award tally. For simplification and to avoid errors, each award in this list has been presumed to have had a prior nomination.)
- Wins: 5
- Nominations: 24

Ivi Adamou is a Greek Cypriot singer. Until 2013, she was signed to the Sony Music record label after her participation in the second season of The X Factor. In June 2010, Adamou released her debut album, an extended play named Kalokairi Stin Kardia that included her first single "A*G*A*P*I". The album was certified gold for selling over 60,000 copies. Her second extended play, Christmas with Ivi Adamou, was certified double platinum in Portugal for selling over 50,000 copies. Her first studio album San Ena Oniro was released in July 2011 and peaked at the 17th place in the Greek album charts. Her single "La La Love" became a success after competing in the Eurovision Song Contest 2012 and was charted in the European countries including Sweden, Spain and the United Kingdom.

Adamou had several nominations at the MAD Video Music Awards since 2011. She won two awards, for the best video clip urban and the best Cypriot artist. She was also nominated three years in a row at the Madame Figaro Awards for the best Cypriot woman singer and won two of them, in 2010 and 2012. In 2013, "Time to Love" won a web award for the best song of the year. In 2015, she was nominated in the Golden Edition of the Big Apple Music Awards.

== Eurodanceweb Award ==
The Eurodanceweb Award is an online competition dedicated to dance music, created in 2001 by an idea of a group of Italian and Maltese disc jockeys. Main purpose of this project is the promotion of dance songs from all over Europe and the Mediterranean Basin, with strong links to their National language and culture. Adamou did not receive any award out of the one nomination.

Year	Nominated	Award	Result	Ref.
2013	"Time to Love"	Best Dance Song	Nominated	

== Eurovision Radio Awards ==
The Eurovision Radio Awards is a web award held by the Eurovision radio. It honors songs and artists of the respective Eurovision year contest. Adamou has not received any awards out of the two nominations.

Year	Nominated	Award	Result	Ref.
2012	Ivi Adamou	Best Female Artist	Nominated	
2012	"La La Love"	Best Song	Nominated	

== Eurovision Song Contest ==
The Eurovision Song Contest is an annual competition held among active member countries of the EBU. The contest, which has been broadcast every year since its debut in 1956, is one of the longest-running television programs and most watched in the world. Adamou represented Cyprus in the 2012 contest.

Year	Nominated	Award	Result	Ref.
2012	"La La Love"	Best Song	16th place	

== MAD Video Music Awards ==
The MAD Video Music Awards is an annual awards show that air on MAD TV. The awards honor the year's biggest achievements in music, voted by the viewers of Mad television. Adamou has received two awards out of 16 nominations.

Year	Nominated	Award	Result	Ref.
2011	Ivi Adamou	Best Newcomer Artist	Nominated	
2011	Ivi Adamou	Best Female Artist	Nominated	
2011	"San Erthi I Mera" (with Stavento)	Best Video Clip Hip Hop/Urban	Won	
2011	"San Erthi I Mera" (with Stavento)	Best Duet/Collaboration	Nominated	
2011	"San Erthi I Mera" (with Stavento)	Best Video Clip	Nominated	
2012	Ivi Adamou	Best Female Artist	Nominated	
2012	Ivi Adamou	Cyprus Artist of the Year	Won	
2012	"Krata Ta Matia Sou Kleista" (with Melisses)	Best Duet/Collaboration	Nominated	
2013	"Madness"	Best Duet/Collaboration	Nominated	
2013	"Den Iparheis"	Song of the Year	Nominated	
2013	"La La Love"	Song of the Year	Nominated	
2016	"Tipota De Mas Stamata"	Best Urban Video	Nominated	
2022	Ivi Adamou	Best Female Artist Modern	Nominated	
2022	"Gia Sena" (with Stavento)	Best Duet/Collaboration	Nominated	
2022	"Gia Sena" (with Stavento)	Best Video Clip	Nominated	
2022	"Gia Sena" (with Stavento)	Song of the Year	Nominated	

== Madame Figaro Awards ==
The Madame Figaro Awards is an annual Cypriot awards show and honors women of Cyprus in different categories such as music and politics. Adamou has received three awards out of four nominations.

Year	Nominated	Award	Result	Ref.
2010	Ivi Adamou	Musician of the Year	Won	
2011	Ivi Adamou	Musician of the Year	Nominated	
2012	Ivi Adamou	Musician of the Year	Won	
2021	Ivi Adamou	Musician of the Year	Won	

== Super Music Awards ==
The Super Music Awards is an annual Cypriot music awards show held by the radio station Super FM. Adamou has not received any awards out of the two nominations.

Year	Nominated	Award	Result	Ref.
2021	Ivi Adamou	Best Female Artist Modern	Nominated	
2021	"Gia Sena" (with Stavento)	Best Duet/Collaboration	Nominated	

== Rankings ==
Year	Title	Rank
2011	FX-News's Hottest Female Singers	10th
2012	OneMan's Hottest Eurovision Women	13th
2012	OneMan's Hottest Woman	8th
2012	Sportlife's Hottest Female Singers	8th
2013	OneMan's Hottest Woman	58th
2014	OneMan's Hottest Woman	68th
