= 2013 MAD Video Music Awards =

- Date: 25 June 2013
- Location: Tae Kwon Do Stadium, Athens, Greece
- Hosted by: Themis Georgantas; Mary Sinatsaki

Television/radio coverage
- Network: MAD and ANT1 (Greece); ANT1 (Cyprus); MAD BG (Bulgaria)

The 2013 MAD Video Music Awards were the 10th award ceremony, hosted by Themis Georgantas and Mary Sinatsaki. They took place on 25 June 2013. The awards were broadcast from the Tae Kwon Do Stadium in Athens, honoring the best music videos and artists of the past year. The theme song, "We Are Young", was performed by the Australian-Greek singer Vassy. The nominations were announced on 23 May 2013 by the presenter, Themis Georgantas. Vegas received five nominations, while Elena Paparizou, Sakis Rouvas, Michalis Hatzigiannis, Melisses and Demy received four. The song "All the Time" received three nominations, the most for any song.

As every year there were thirty three categories with additionally, the top 50 category which was introduced for first time where the fans could vote their five favorite out of the fifty.

Due to the celebration of the 10 years, the logo was selected through The Missing Logo, a contest where the fans could create their own logos. The winning logo was revealed on 1 May 2013. Also there was another contest with the fifty best performances from the past awards and the people could vote for their favorites.

== Shows ==
As every year, a kick-off party was held to mark the start of the Awards. The party was held on 23 May 2013 at the Balux Privé in Athens, the same day the voting opened. Eleni Foureira, Ivi Adamou, Vegas, Kostas Martakis were some of the artists that attended for the party. A 10 hours live concert was held on 14 June to celebrate the 10 years of the awards. Artists including Ivi Adamou, Melisses, Demy, Shaya and Stavento performed in the concert.

A few hours before the ceremony a MAD PreShow was held with Melisses, Melina Zisi, Snik, OGE, The Fade and Stelios Legakis performing cover versions of the best performances through the ten years of the awards. The songs were picked by the fans in April.

== Awards ==
The nominations were announced on 23 May 2013.

=== Video of the Year ===
Sakis Rouvas – "Tora"

- Demy – "Poses Hiliades Kalokairia"
- Claydee – "Mamacita Buena"
- Playmen feat. Elena Paparizou, Courtney and RiskyKidd – "All the Time"
- Vegas – "Pio Psila"

=== Best Laiko Video ===
Antonis Remos – "Ta Savvata"

- Peggy Zina – "Sou hrostao akoma ena klama"
- Nikiforos – "Trelos"
- Giorgos Mazonakis – "Ego agapao anarhika"
- Paola – "Na m'afiseis isihi thelo"

=== Best Pop Video ===
Demy – "Poses Hiliades Kalokairia"

- Melisses & Duomo – "Se Thimamai"
- Kostas Martakis – "S'eho anagki s'agapo"
- Sakis Rouvas – "Tora"
- Eleni Foureira – "Pio Erotas Pethaineis"

=== Best Dance Video ===
Playmen feat. Elena Paparizou, Courtney and RiskyKidd – "All the Time"

- Claydee – "Mamacita Buena"
- Etostone feat. Carlos Galavis – "For Eternity"
- Phatjak Feat. Perry Mystique – "Yayo"
- Pink Noisy feat. Radio Killer – "Mestral"

=== Best Pop Rock Video ===
Giorgos Sabanis – "Ora Miden"

- Melisses – "More Than That"
- Onirama – "Den Iparheis"
- Kokkina Halia – "Esi & Ego"
- Mironas Startis – "An me theleis"

=== Best Urban Video ===
Stan – "Kalokairini Drosia"

- Rec – "Moirazo Filia"
- Stavento – "Astrapsa kai Vrontiksa"
- Vegas – "Pio Psila"
- Michalis Hatzigiannis feat. Midenistis – "Se Ena Toiho"

=== Fashion Icon in Video ===
Eleni Foureira – "Pio Erotas Pethaineis"

- Shaya – "Love Me"
- Tamta – "Konta Sou"
- Vegas – "Osa Eiha"
- Despina Vandi – "Katalavaino"

=== Best Collaboration ===
Playmen feat. Elena Paparizou, Courtney and RiskyKidd – "All the Time"

- Goin' Through feat. Melisses – "Opos Ego"
- OGE feat. Christina Salti – "Sto Dromo Mou"
- Ivi Adamou feat. tU – "Madness"
- Michalis Hatzigiannis feat. Midenistis – "Se Ena Toiho"

=== Best Band ===
Melisses

- Onirama
- Playmen
- Stavento
- Vegas

=== Best Female artist ===
Elena Paparizou

- Anna Vissi
- Demy
- Despina Vandi
- Eleni Foureira

=== Best Male artist ===
Sakis Rouvas

- Giorgos Mazonakis
- Kostas Martakis
- Michalis Hatzigiannis
- Stan

=== Best Newcomer artist ===
Pantelis Pantelidis

- Freaky Fortune
- Pink Noisy
- Fani Avramidou
- Thomai Apergi

=== Artist of the Year ===
Antonis Remos

- Demy
- Michalis Hatzigiannis
- Sakis Rouvas
- Vegas

=== Top 50 ===
Konstantinos Argiros – "Paidi Gennaio"

- Playmen feat. Elena Paparizou – "All the Time"
- Natasa Theodoridou – "Apenanti"
- Nino – "Apose den pame spiti"
- Rec – "Ase me na s'agapo"
- Melina Aslanidou – "Den eho diefthinsi"
- Pantelis Pantelidis – "Den tairiazetai sou leo"
- Onirama feat. Ivi Adamou – "Den Iparhis"
- Stelios Rokkos – "Eimai dikos sou"
- Nikos Oikonomopoulos – "Ennoeitai"
- Paola – "Ftais"
- Konstantinos Argiros – "Pote Ksana"
- Giorgos Papadopoulos – "Esi den ksereis"
- Giorgos Sabanis – "Gia afto s'agapo"
- Natasa Theodoridou – "Gia kanenan"
- Demy – "I Zoi (To Pio Omorfo Tragoudi)"
- Nino – "Koinos Paronomastis"
- Konstantinos Argiros – "Mia Nihta Kolasi"
- Bang La Decks – "Kuedon"
- Ivi Adamou – "La La Love"
- Giorgos Mazonakis – "Leipei pali o theos"
- Claydee feat. Kostas Martakis – "Mamacita Buena"
- Radio Killer feat. Pink Noisy – "Mestral"
- Rec – "Moirazo Filia"
- Giorgos Sabanis – "Mono an thes emena"
- Demy feat. OGE – "Mono Mprosta"
- Paola – "Na m'afiseis isihi thelo"
- Christos Holidis – "Na me thimase"
- Nikiforos – "Trelos"
- Vegas – "Osa Eiha"
- Vegas – "Pio Psila"
- Michalis Hatzigiannis – "Plai Plai"
- Demy – "Poses Hiliades Kalokairia"
- Nikos Oikonomopoulos – "Psakse me"
- Michalis Hatzigiannis feat. Midenistis – "Se Ena Toiho"
- OtherView – "See You Again"
- Peggy Zina – "Sou hrostao akoma ena klama"
- Giannis Ploutarhos – "So antitheto revma"
- Antonis Remos – "Ta Savvata"
- Antonis Remos – "Ta hiliometra ola"
- Giorgos Giannias – "Tha Mou Perasei"
- Nikos Vertis – "Thimose apopse i kardia"
- Eleni Foureira feat. Midenistis – "To party den stamata"
- Konstantinos Argiros – "Giati ego"
- Despina Vandi – "To asteri mou"
- Despina Vandi – "To nisi"
- Michalis Hatzigiannis – "Treis zoes"
- Anna Vissi – "Tiraniemai"
- Sakis Rouvas – "Tora"
- Phatjak – "Yayo"

== Performances ==
34 artists have been confirmed to perform at the award night.

- Alex Leon
- Anise K
- Antonis Remos
- Arash
- Christina Salti
- Claydee
- Courtney
- Demy
- DJ Kas
- Elena Paparizou
- Eleni Foureira
- Epsilon
- Hadley
- HouseTwins
- Ivi Adamou
- Kostas Martakis
- Manos Pirovolakis
- Melisses
- Midenistis
- Mironas Stratis
- Nikiforos
- Onirama
- Ola
- Pantelis Pantelidis
- Playmen
- Rec
- Sakis Rouvas
- Shaya
- Stan
- Stavento
- Stelios Rokkos
- Tamta
- Vassy
- Vegas
