= Ponane Oi Agapes =

Single by Ivi Adamou
- Released: 31 May 2013
- Recorded: 2013
- Genre: Pop
- Length: 3:14
- Label: Sony Music Greece; Feelgood Records
- Songwriter: Meth
- Producer: Meth

Ivi Adamou singles chronology
"Na Sou Tragoudo" (2013)	"Ponane Oi Agapes" (2013)	"Tipota De Mas Stamata" (2016)

Music video
- "Ponane Oi Agapes" on YouTube

"Ponane Oi Agapes" (Greek: Πονάνε οι αγάπες; Loves Hurt) is a 2013 pop song by the Greek-Cypriot singer Ivi Adamou. It was released on 31 May 2013.

== Background and release ==
The song was released via the official channel of Sony Music Greece. It is her second single that is written by Meth (Stavento), with the first being "Kano Mia Efhi".

== Track listing ==
Digital download

1. "Ponane Oi Agapes" – 3:14

== Credits and personnel ==
- Lead vocals – Ivi Adamou
- Producers – Meth
- Lyrics – Meth
- Label: Sony Music Greece

== Music video ==
It was announced through the official Facebook page that the shooting for the music video would start very soon. Also, suggestions from the fans were asked through the page. In mid-July some photos from the video's shooting were leaked. Some days later, on 24 July 2013, more photos from the shooting were published. The video is shot at Lake Doxa in Corinthia and is directed by Alexandros Grammatopoulos. The video was premiered on 2 August 2013.

== Release history ==
Country	Date	Format	Label
Greece	31 May 2013	Digital download	Sony Music Greece
Cyprus	31 May 2013	Digital download	Sony Music Greece
