= Barbarella: the 80's Musical =

Musical comedy

- Music: Various
- Lyrics: Various
- Book: Giorgos Valaris; Stelios Papadopoulos
- Setting: Athens
- Premiere: November 7, 2015: Pireos 131 Theater
- Productions: 2015 Greece

Barbarella: the 80's Musical (also known as just Barbarella or 80's, the Μusical) is a 2015 jukebox musical comedy with a book by Giorgos Valaris and Stelios Papadopoulos. The music is based on hits of the 1980s (international and Greek).

The musical evolves around the romantic story and the obstacles of a young couple and their friends and also gives through a comedic way the traditions and way of living of that time.

== Background ==
The musical was first announced when Eleni Foureira revealed to be part of it through her interview in Hello Rehearsals for the musical started during the second week of September and the premiere was rumored to be around the end of October. The rest of the main cast members were revealed five days later, on 15 September 2015. The same day, cast member Ivi Adamou posted a photo on Instagram with other cast members and the director.

The first poster of the musical was revealed on 9 October 2015. The musical's premiere was announced to be on 28 October 2015, but was later changed to 7 November 2015. Photos from the musical's rehearsal were published on 13 October 2015. Following its premiere, the musical received generally favorable reviews. A teaser was also released a week after the musical's premiere. The musical concluded on 27 March 2016 after a total of 80 shows.

== Plot ==
Sofia is studying in the University of Athens but her dream is to become a singer. Sofia is in love with "lover-boy" Alexis, a famous radio pirate who runs the "Radio Teenagers" radio piracy station with his friends Chris and Makis. Against this relationship is Sofia's older brother, Kiriakos who since their father's death has been trying to protect her and doesn't want her to be with Alexis but instead wishes her to marry with whoever he wants. Mary who is Sofia's best friend, falls in love with Kiriakos. Evi also Sofia's friend, is a Greek-American teenager who is later in relationship with Makis, known as the "sex machine".

All the characters, under the guidance and the decisive role of Evi's mother, Jenny, a big singer and diva of the time, who gives in Chris' attempts to get her, live along their own love adventures and try to help Sofia with getting over the prohibitions and the problems that occur and finally manage to get the couple together. After a lot of twists and dramatic obstacles, but mainly through a lot of music and dance with background the disco Barbarella and DJ Jendai, they are finally redeemed with a spectacular grand finale party.

== Productions ==
The original production opened at the Pireos 131 Theater in Athens, Greece on November 7, 2015. The production was directed by Giorgos Valaris, who also wrote the script, and choreographed by Anna Athanasiadi. The production featured scenic design by Blonde, costumes by Alexandra Katsaeti, and lighting by Alekos Anastasiou. The show's band was made up of Vasilis Pagonis (guitar), Vaios Christodoulou (keyboard), Vasilis Dimoudis (electronic bouzouki), Kostas Lathouras (drums), and Thanos Zouras (bass).

== Original cast and characters ==
| Character | Original Performer | Description |
|---|---|---|
| Sofia | Eleni Foureira | A student with an ambition to become a singer |
| Jenny Pappa | Katy Garbi | A big singer and diva who is Evi's mother |
| Alexis | Giannis Hadjigeorgiou | A famous radio pirate who is in love with Sofia |
| Mary | Ioanna Pilihou | Sofia's best friend |
| Evi Pappa | Ivi Adamou | A Greek-American teenager |
| Kiriakos | Stamatis Gardelis | Sofia's older brother and member of a band |
| Makis | Charis Chiotis | Alexis' friend who falls in love with Evi |
| Chris | Emilios Raftis | Alexis' friend who falls in love with Jenny |
| DJ Jendai | Giorgos Valaris | The DJ at the Barbarella disco party |
