= Avra (song) =

Single by Ivi Adamou

from the album Avra Digital Single
- Released: June 28, 2012
- Recorded: 2012
- Genre: Dance-pop, electropop, Eurodance
- Length: 3:45
- Label: Sony Music Greece/Day 1
- Songwriters: Pink Noisy (George Kartsakis), GiorGio Sopidis, Faidon Samsidis
- Producer: Pink Noisy

Ivi Adamou singles chronology
"Madness" (2012)	"Avra" (2012)	"Ase Me" (2012)

Avra by Greek Cypriot singer Ivi Adamou, is the Greek version of the song "Mestral" by the Greek producer Pink Noisy.

== Production and recording ==
Ivi's vocals on "Avra" were recorded and produced by Pink Noisy. "Avra" was co-produced and co-arranged by the Greek producer Pink Noisy (George Kartsakis) and co-written by the Greeks GiorGio Sopidis, Faidon Samsidis.

== Formats and track listings ==
- iTunes EP
1. "Avra (Mestral)" - 3:45
