= Tipota De Mas Stamata =

Single by Ivi Adamou
- Released: 25 January 2016
- Recorded: 2015
- Genre: Pop
- Length: 3:42
- Label: Rootopia; Minos EMI
- Songwriter(s): Michalis Kouinelis
- Producer(s): Kouinelis

Ivi Adamou singles chronology
| "Ponane Oi Agapes" (2013) | "Tipota De Mas Stamata" (2016) | "Akou Sopa" (2016) |

"Tipota De Mas Stamata" (Greek: Τίποτα δε μας σταματά; Nothing Stops Us) is a song recorded by Greek Cypriot singer Ivi Adamou. It was released on 18 January 2016 on radio stations and digitally on 25 January 2016. It is the first single of the singer since her 2013 non-album single "Ponane Oi Agapes". The song was written and produced by Michalis Kouinelis.

"Tipota De Mas Stamata" received critical acclaim from critics, who praised the more mature sound of the singer and also the optimistic messages and its upbeat sound. The accompanying music video for the song was filmed in late 2015 and premiered on 24 January 2016. The video shows Adamou walking around a city and also dancing on a white background with other dancers. Ivi Adamou promoted her song by performing it live during her residency concert at the Fever music hall with Nikos Oikonomopoulos and Christos Cholidis.

== Background and release ==
"My new single "Tipota De Mas Stamata", for example, is presented there [at Fever]. If I didn't do it, I wouldn't have the chance to share it with the world."

—Ivi Adamou talking to DownTown about Fever.

In May 2015, Adamou posted a photo of her in the studio with the caption "Something new is getting prepared... #staytuned", teasing the release of her new single. On 10 December 2015 she posted a photo on her Instagram account saying that her new song and music video would be revealed soon. Adamou confirmed the title of the song to be "Tipota De Mas Stamata" during an interview on the Cypriot DownTown magazine.

On 15 January 2016, a teaser of the song was posted while it was also announced that the full song would be first heard on 18 January 2016 on Dromos FM and other selected radio stations. On 20 January 2016, The song surfaced online on several radio websites following its radio release two days earlier. The song's artwork was also revealed the same day and featured Adamou sitting on a couch wearing a black jumpsuit with flourish patterns.

== Composition ==
"Tipota De Mas Stamata" is an uptempo pop song running for a total of three minutes and forty-two seconds. Lyrically the song talks about a couple, who despite the difficulties, they unexpectedly manage to stay together.

== Reception ==
=== Critical response ===
Once the song's teaser was released, the song received mostly positive reviews. Nikoletta Stamati of Mikrofwno described it as a "dance-y", "positive" and "very addictive" song and predicted that it would rise to the top of the charts. Similarly, Giannos Litras of music.net.cy said that the song is "dance-y, full with optimism and positive energy". Dimitris Tzouvaras from Hit Channel said that the song has the "characteristic imprint from Michalis Kouinelis in both the music and the lyrics".

Upon the song's release on the radio stations, the song received generally positive feedback. Katerina Gkini of tralala.gr said that "[Adamou] comes back more mature and stronger than ever with new sounds" and also said that the song is "full with optimism and positive energy". Demetra Tsipi of Online Epikairotita said that the song lyrically could be about Adamou's relationship with Kouinelis and compared part of its lyrics to lyrics of their 2010 song "San Erthi I Mera". Kiki Vasiliadou from Energy Radio described the song as "fresh", that it would be heard from the radios for a long time and that the song "differs from other songs of its genre".

=== Chart performance ===
The song peaked at fourth place in the audience chart of the Greek radio station Sok FM, and was also the third most voted song to be the song of the week of 23 January 2016.

== Music video ==
The music video was shot in late 2015. Adamou posted a still from the music video on her Instagram account, announcing the release of both the single and the music video. Several scenes of the music video were seen in the song's teaser revealed on 15 January 2016. On 19 January 2016, Adamou posted a backstage photo from the music video with the caption "Backstage from the Video Clip of "Tipota de mas stamata"!! #comingsoon". Through an Instagram post where she commented on the reactions to the song, Adamou revealed that the music video would premiere on 24 January 2016. Additionally, a teaser for the music video was published the same day. The music video premiered on 24 January 2016 at 21:30 EET with Adamou publishing it on her Facebook page along with the caption "With much excitement and after a long time, I share with you my new song! I hope you love it as much as I do and share it, giving out the message: “love cannot be stopped by anything”!". The video was directed by Dimitris Sylvestros was uploaded first on Rootopia's channel and later on Adamou's channel.

== Credits and personnel ==
Personnel

- Lead vocals – Ivi Adamou
- Producers – Michalis Kouinelis
- Songwriting – Michalis Kouinelis

== Release history ==
| Region | Date | Format | Label |
|---|---|---|---|
| Greece | 18 January 2016 | Radio airplay | Rootopia; Minos EMI |
| Cyprus | 25 January 2016 | Digital download | Rootopia; Minos EMI |
| Greece | 25 January 2016 | Digital download | Rootopia; Minos EMI |
