= Na Sou Tragoudo =

Single by Ivi Adamou and Stavento

Single by Stavento feat. Ivi Adamou

from the album Stin akri tou kosmou
- Released: 11 March 2013
- Recorded: 2013
- Genre: Pop, Hip hop
- Length: 4:01
- Label: Sony Music Greece

Ivi Adamou singles chronology
"Time To Love" (2013)	"Na Sou Tragoudo" (2013)	"Ponane Oi Agapes" (2013)

Stavento singles chronology
"Astrapsa kai Vrontiksa" (2012)	"Na Sou Tragoudo" (2013)

Music video
- "Na Sou Tragoudo" on YouTube

"Na Sou Tragoudo" (Greek: Να σου τραγουδώ) is a 2013 pop and hip hop song by the Greek-Cypriot singer Ivi Adamou with the Greek hip hop band Stavento. It's their second collaboration, after San Erthi I Mera. A teaser was released on 22 February 2013 and was later announced that the song will be released on 4 March 2013.

== Release ==
Stavento posted a photo from the shooting of the video clip on 6 February, announcing their second collaboration with Ivi Adamou. The song was first heard along with the music video on MAD TV YouTube Channel and MAD Radio 106,2 on 4 March 2013.

== Track listing ==
Digital download

1. "Na Sou Tragoudo" – 4:01

== Credits and personnel ==
- Lead vocals – Stavento and Ivi Adamou
- Producers – Meth
- Lyrics – Meth
- Label: Sony Music Greece

== Music video ==
The video was first seen at MAD TV on 8 March 2013. It received 100,000 views in three days. The video was later uploaded in StaventoVEVO and currently has more than 2 million views.

== Release history ==
Country	Date	Format	Label
Greece	11 March 2013	Digital download	Sony Music Greece
Cyprus	11 March 2013	Digital download	Sony Music Greece
