= San Ena Oniro =

Studio album by Ivi Adamou
- Released: 22 July 2011
- Recorded: 2011; Workshop Studios, Melody Studio, Tiny Pine Studio
- Genre: Pop; dance-pop
- Length: 34:18
- Label: Sony Music Greece; Day 1
- Producer: Giannis Doxas; Per Aldeheim; Nalle Ahlstedt; Flawless; Vasilis Gavriilidis; Giannis Hristodoulopoulos; Michalis Kouinelis; Melisses; Dimitris Stassos; Mikko Tamminen; Leonidas Tzitzos; Victory

Ivi Adamou chronology
Christmas with Ivi Adamou (2010)	San Ena Oniro (2011)

Singles from San Ena Oniro
- 1. "Krata Ta Matia Sou Klista" Released: May 2011; 2. "Kano Mia Efhi" Released: July 2011; 3. "Voltes St Asteria" Released: October 2011

Singles from San Ena Oniro (Euro Edition)
- 1. "La La Love" Released: January 6, 2012

San Ena Oniro (Greek: Σαν Ένα Όνειρο; English: Like a dream) is the first studio album by Greek Cypriot singer Ivi Adamou, released in Greece and Cyprus on 22 July 2011 by Sony Music Greece. The album was re-released as a "Euro Edition" featuring the three songs that Adamou competed with in the Cypriot national final for the Eurovision Song Contest 2012, as well as a Greek-language version of one of the songs.

== Singles ==
"Krata Ta Matia Sou Klista" "Krata Ta Matia Sou Klista" (Greek: Κράτα τα ματια σου κλειστα; English: Keep your eyes closed) is the first single by the Greek Cypriot singer Ivi Adamou from her second album San Ena Oniro, written and produced by Melisses. It was released on 23 April 2011.

Three teasers were released for the video clip. The official video clip was published on 23 April 2011. The video was blocked worldwide and was later re-uploaded in MelissesVEVO.

The second single, "Kano Mia Efhi" (Greek: Κάνω μια ευχή; English: I make a wish), was written by Meth and Megeda and produced by Meth. It was released on 21 June 2011. It was announced that the video clip will be first seen in Sony Ericsson Greece's Facebook page. A teaser of the video clip was released on 19 July 2011. The video was published on VEVO on 29 July 2011.

The third single, "Voltes St Asteria" (Greek: Βόλτες στ' αστερια; English: Rides to the stars), was written by Giannis Hristodoulopoulos and Giannis Doxas and produced by Giannis Hristodoulopoulos. It was released on 21 June 2011. The teaser of the video clip was released on 5 October 2011. The video clip was fully released few days later on VEVO. However the video is currently unavailable on the channel.

"La La Love" is the fourth and final single.

== Editions ==
The album had two editions, the regular and the euro edition released in July 2011 and January 2012 respectively.

=== Regular edition ===
The regular edition was released in Cyprus and Greece on 22 July 2011. It included ten songs with the most being written and produced by Giannis Hristodoulopoulos and Yiannis Doxas. Some of the songs were written in English by foreigner lyricists and were translated to Greek. The album included Adamou's collaboration with Mellises, "Krata Ta Matia Sou Klista".

"Tis Agapis Ta Thimata", was set to be released by Elena Paparizou but was later recorded by Adamou. The song was originally written under the title "Murderous" and was translated for the album. The song "Fige" had an English version named "Madness" which was not included in the album and featured the Greek band tU. The album's title track, "San Ena Oniro", was originally performed by Robert Williams and Bessy Argiraki. Adamou performed her own version of the song with Giorgos Papadimitrakis from the band Kokkina Halia.

=== Euro edition ===
The euro edition was released in Cyprus and Greece on 30 January 2012. It included all the ten tracks from the regular edition with four additional songs including the fifth single, "La La Love", which represented Cyprus in the 2012 Eurovision Song Contest. It also included the other two songs that were candidates to represent the country. The fourth song, "Fotia Vrohi", was the Greek version of "You Don't Belong Here".

== Critical response ==
Professional ratings
Review scores
Source	Rating
miss.gr	4/5 stars
Music Corner	(mixed)

Critical reaction to San Ena Oniro was generally mixed. Miss magazine author said "a short dream, like all the good ones, as the 10 tracks remind us of the classic LP of the 80s that they only "hid" inside them ... diamonds!" and gave the album four out of five stars.

Marina Skopelitou of Music Corner gave a mixed review to the album; "a clean pop album, with songs of simple melodies and plain lyrics and strong electronic elements". She also said that all the songs are suitable for her age apart from "Kati Gia Na Piasto" which doesn't suit to a young singer. Skopelitou described the songs as "happy", "lighthearted", "dance" and "loved by young audience" while selecting "Voltes St Asteria" and "San Ena Oniro" as the best songs. For the album's second single, "Voltes St Asteria" said that its lyrics are the most interesting thing on the song as they express most people by talking about love that makes money and material goods unnecessary. At the end, she described the album as "another good try by Adamou who makes her first steps".

== Track listing ==
San Ena Oniro - standard edition
No.	Title	Writer(s)	Producer(s)	Length
1.	"The Queen"	Dimitris Stassos, Michaela Stenström	Stassos	3:42
2.	"Kano Mia Efhi" (feat. Daddy Nek) (I make a wish)	Michalis "Meth" Kouinelis, Mageda	Meth	3:30
3.	"Voltes St Asteria" (Rides to the stars)	Giannis Hristodoulopoulos, Giannis Doxas	Hristodoulopoulos	3:57
4.	"Fige" (Go away)	Nalle Ahlstedt, Vagia Kalantzi	Ahlstedt	3:16
5.	"Kati Gia Na Piasto" (Something to hold on to)	Vasilis Gavriilidis, Thanos Papanikolaou	Gavriilidis, Leonidas Tzitzos	3:35
6.	"Krata Ta Matia Sou Klista" (feat. Melisses) (Keep your eyes closed)	Melisses	Melisses	3:40
7.	"S' Agapo Ki As Mou Pire Kairo" (I love you even though it took me a while)	Hristodoulopoulos, Giannis Doxas	Hristodoulopoulos	2:51
8.	"Astrapes" (Lightnings)	Mikko Tamminen, Ahlstedt, Stenstrom, Faidon Samsidis (Greek lyrics)	Tamminen	3:08
9.	"Tis Agapis Ta Thimata" (Love's victims)	Darren Hayes, Alan Nglish, Samsidis (Greek lyrics)	Flawless (Vangelis Kostoxenakis, Evan Klemakis)	3:22
10.	"San Ena Oniro" (feat. Giorgos Papadimitrakis) (Like a dream)	Robert Williams	Hristodoulopoulos	3:13

San Ena Oniro – euro edition bonus tracks
No.	Title	Writer(s)	Producer(s)	Length
11.	"Call The Police"	Lene Dissing, Jakob Glæsner, Tamminen	Tamminen	3:01
12.	"La La Love"	Alex Papaconstantinou, Bjorn Djupstrom, Alexandra Zakka, Viktor Svensson	Victory	3:02
13.	"You Don't Belong Here"	Niklas Jarl, Alexander Schold, Sharon Vaughn	Per Aldeheim	3:01
14.	"Fotia Vrohi (You Don't Belong Here)" (Fire rain)	Jarl, Schold, Vaughn, Doxas (Greek lyrics)	Aldeheim	3:01

== Personnel ==
- Giannis Doxas – executive producer
- Dimitris Stassos – production, arrangement, mixing, background vocals
- Giannis Hristodoulopoulos – production, arrangement, guitar, mixing
- Vasilis Gavriilidis – production, arrangement, programming, keys
- Leonidas Tzitzos – production, arrangement, programming, keys
- Nalle Ahlstedt – production, arrangement, programming
- Melisses – production, arrangement, mixing
- Mikko Tamminen – production, arrangement, mixing
- Flawless (Vangelis Kostoxenakis, Evan Klimakis) – production, arrangement
- Mihalis "Meth" Kouinelis – production, arrangement
- Tasos Hamosfakidis – recording, vocal recording, mixing
- Melody Production Group – recording, mixing
- Christos Kouligas – guitar
- Eyo – mixing
- Elena Patroklou – vocal coach
- Marianna Gerasimidou – background vocals
- Mikaela Stenström – background vocals
- Malin Dinah Sundstrom – background vocals
- Sibel Redzep – background vocals
- Bill Georgoussis – photography
- Cult Design – album cover art
- Stefanos Vasilakis – hairstyling
- Grigoris Pirpilis – make up
- Dionisis Kolpodinos – personal stylist
- Mirto Gonou – image editing

== Charts ==
=== Peak positions ===
Chart	Peak position
Greek Albums Chart Top 75	17

=== Singles ===
"Krata Ta Matia Sou Klista"
Chart (2011)
Peak position
Greece Digital Songs (Billboard)	3

== Release history ==
Region	Date	Format	Edition	Label
Greece	22 July 2011	CD, digital download	Original version	Sony Music Entertainment
Cyprus	22 July 2011	CD, digital download	Original version	Sony Music Entertainment
Greece	30 January 2012	digital download	Euro Edition	Sony Music Entertainment
Cyprus	30 January 2012	digital download	Euro Edition	Sony Music Entertainment

== La La Love Tour ==
La La Love Tour
- Tour by Ivi Adamou
- Associated album: San Ena Oniro
- Start date: June 15, 2012
- End date: December 23, 2012
- No. of shows: 24 in Europe

Ivi Adamou concert chronology
- Eurovision Promo Tour (2011–12); La La Love Tour (2012)

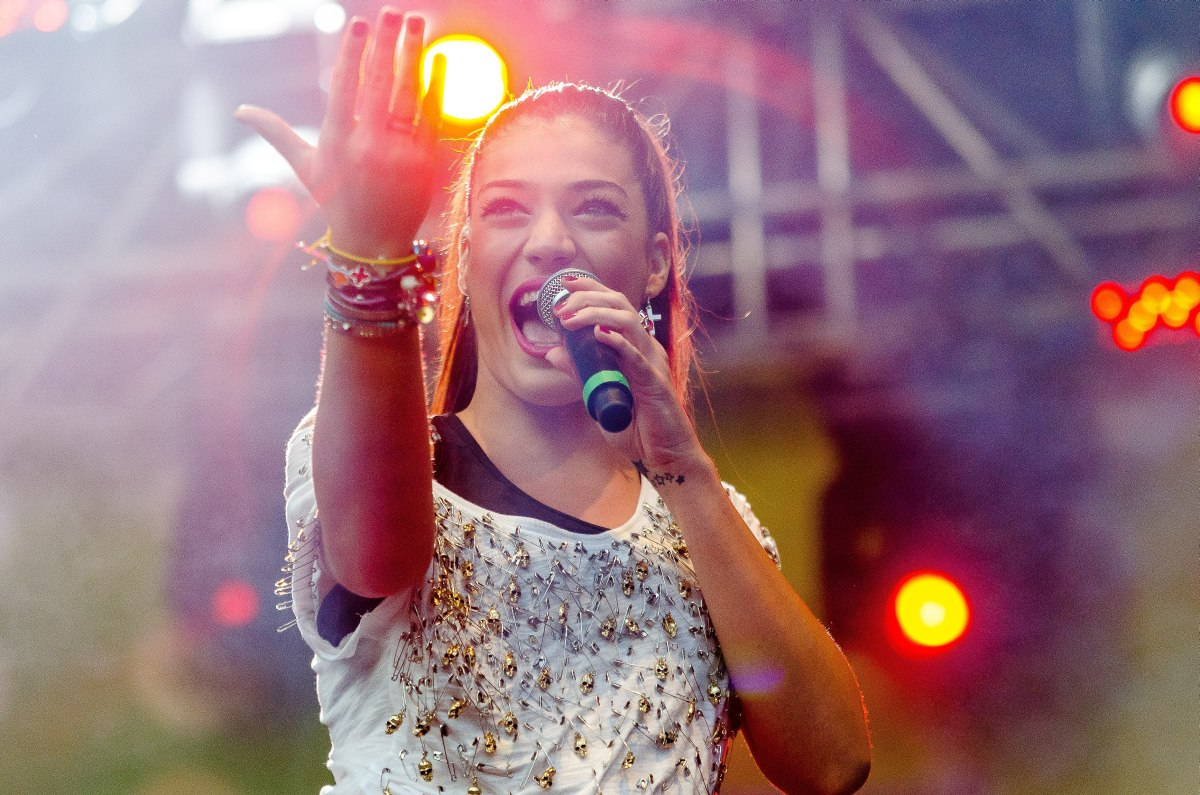
Ivi Adamou at Rix FM Festival 2012 in Växjö.

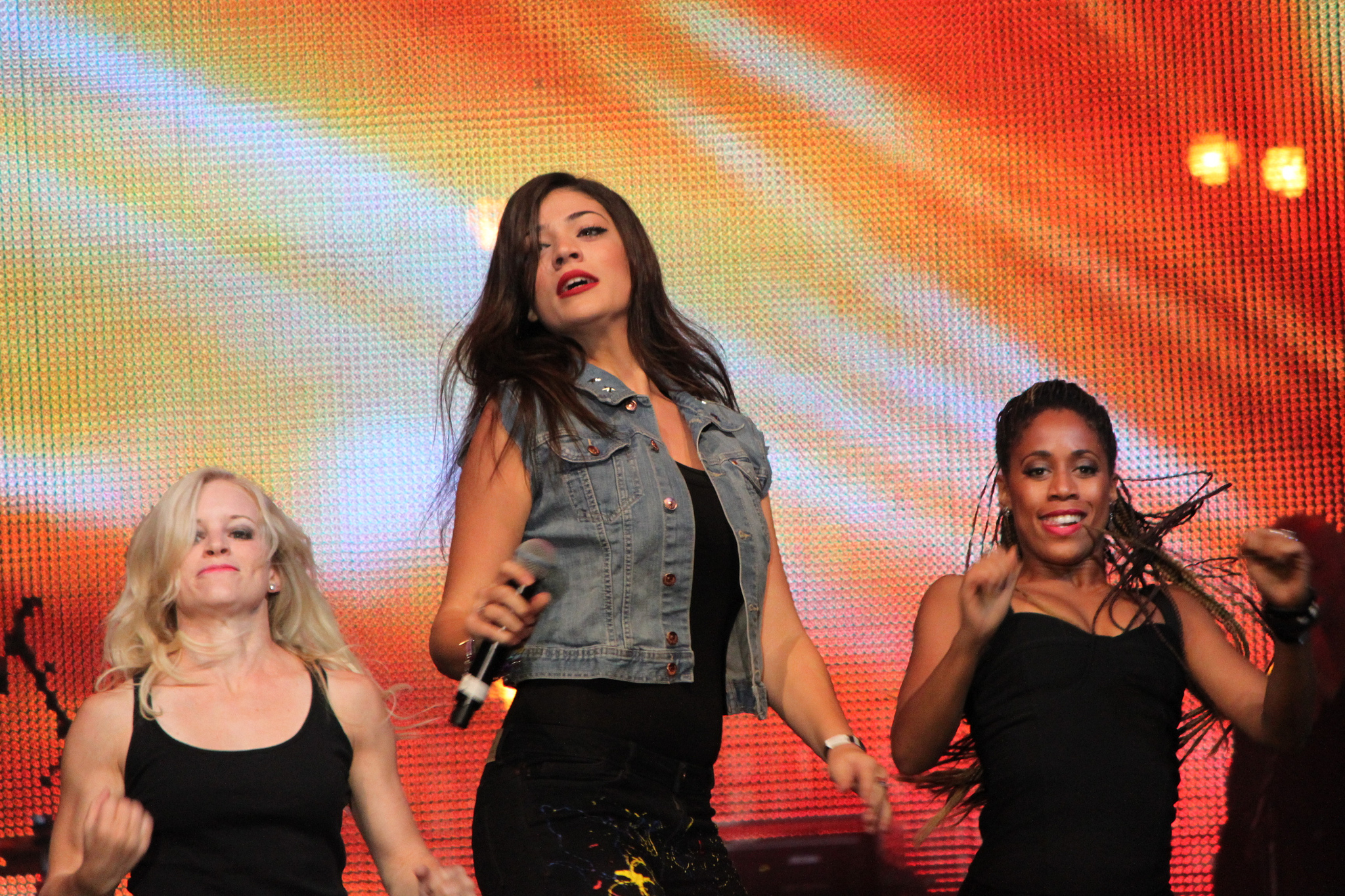
Ivi Adamou at Stockholm Pride in 2012.

Adamou toured in Europe after the 2012 Eurovision Song Contest and performed her songs including "La La Love" and "Madness".

Date	City	Country	Venue
15 June 2012	Karditsa	Greece	Cosi Summer Club
24 June 2012	Thessaloniki	Greece	Versus Beach Bar
28 June 2012	Komotini	Greece	Sports Center (Street Show 2012)
29 June 2012	Limassol	Cyprus	Drop Beach Bar
9 July 2012	Kristianstad	Sweden	Tivoliparken (RIX FM Festival)
14 July 2012	Limassol	Cyprus	Stephanis
20 July 2012	Sparti	Greece	Prince Club Sparti
25 July 2012	Tirana	Albania	—
26 July 2012	Nicosia	Cyprus	Kallipoleos 4
2 August 2012	Stockholm	Sweden	(Stockholm Pride)
3 August 2012	Växjö	Sweden	(RIX FM Festival)
4 August 2012	Stockholm	Sweden	Göta Källare (Miss Gay Sweden 2012)
11 August 2012	Korakou	Cyprus	Korakou Primary School
23 August 2012	Kos	Greece	Anemos Bay Club
28 August 2012	Thessaloniki	Greece	Remvi Club
1 September 2012	Malmö	Sweden	Wonk Club Malmö
21 September 2012	Thessaloniki	Greece	—
22 September 2012	Barcelona	Spain	Les Carpes ViG Estiu
23 September 2012	Barcelona	Spain	Forum Building (FLAIX Festival)
28 September 2012	Lleida	Spain	Larida Lleida Club
29 September 2012	Rosas	Spain	Chic Roses Club
3 November 2012	Boden	Sweden	Western Farm (Halloween Festival)
8 November 2012	Östersjön	Sweden	—
13 December 2012	Stockholm	Sweden	Ericsson Globe (Christmas Spectacular 2012)
20 December 2012	Lympia	Cyprus	Oneiroupoli
23 December 2012	Drama	Greece	Oneiroupoli
