= Time to Love (song) =

Single by Ivi Adamou & Marsal Ventura
- Released: 5 March 2013
- Recorded: 2012
- Genre: House, dance
- Length: 3:36
- Label: Sony Music Greece, Sony Music Spain & LaDans
- Songwriter(s): Marsal Ventura, Ivan Torrent, Jordi Garrido
- Producer(s): Marsal Ventura

Ivi Adamou singles chronology
| "Ase Me" (2012) | "Time to Love" (2013) | "Na Sou Tragoudo" (2013) |

"Time to Love" is a 2013 pop and dance song by the Cypriot singer Ivi Adamou with the Spanish DJ Marsal Ventura. It was announced that the song would be released in February 2013. In mid-February Ivi announced through her Facebook page that the song would be released on 27 February 2013 at Flaix FM and will be on sale on 5 March. A teaser of the song was released on 21 February.

== Background and release ==
The song was released on 27 February 2013 through the Spanish radio Flaix FM. The song is available for download on 5 March 2013. Few minutes after the songs was played in the radio a lyric video was uploaded in Marsal's official channel.

The single was released in Spain, Greece and Cyprus on 5 March. Later, on 19 April, it was released in Russia, Sweden, Norway and the United Kingdom.

== Track listing ==
CD Single

1. "Time to Love" (Radio Edit) – 3:36
2. "Time to Love" (Extended) – 4:21

Digital download

1. "Time to Love" (Radio Edit) – 3:36

== Credits and personnel ==
- Lead vocals – Ivi Adamou
- Producers – Marsal Ventura
- Lyrics – Marsal Ventura
- Label: Sony Music Greece, Sony Music Spain & LaDans

== Release history ==
| Country | Date | Format | Label |
|---|---|---|---|
| Greece | March 5, 2013 | Digital download | Sony Music Greece |
| Cyprus | March 5, 2013 | Digital download | Sony Music Greece |
| Spain | March 5, 2013 | Digital download | Sony Music Spain & LaDans |
| Norway | April 19, 2013 | Digital download | Sony Music |
| Sweden | April 19, 2013 | Digital download | Sony Music |
