= Christmas with Ivi Adamou =

Christmas With Ivi Adamou

EP by Ivi Adamou
- Released: December 22, 2010
- Recorded: 2010; Vox Studios, Athens, Greece;
- Genre: Christmas music
- Length: 34:04
- Label: Sony Music Greece/Day 1
- Producer: Giannis Doxas (executive)

Ivi Adamou chronology
Kalokairi Stin Kardia (2010)	Christmas With Ivi Adamou (2010)	San Ena Oniro (2011)

Singles from Christmas with Ivi Adamou
- 1. "Santa Claus Is Coming To Town" Released: December 2010

Christmas with Ivi Adamou (Greek: Χριστούγεννα με την Ήβη Αδάμου) is the second extended play by Greek Cypriot singer Ivi Adamou, released in Greece and Cyprus 22 November 2010 by Sony Music Greece. The album was subsequently released in the Netherlands and Portugal as Christmas with Ivi Adamou. The recordings are performed with the children's choir of Spiros Lambrou.

== Track listing ==
No.	Title	Writer(s)	{{{extra_column}}}	Length
1.	"Santa Claus Is Coming To Town" (with Spiros Lamprou children's choir)	J.F. Coots/ H.Gillespie		3:14
2.	"Last Christmas" (with Spiros Lamprou children's choir)	George Michael		4:12
3.	"White Christmas" (with Spiros Lamprou children's choir)	Jason Gill, Dimitris Stassos, Mikaela Stenstrom	Irving Berlin	3:14
4.	"Agia Nihta/We Wish You A Merry Christmas" (with Spiros Lamprou children's choir)	(traditional) Greek verses: Kostas Papadimitriou	Eleana Vrahali	3:49

== Singles ==
"Santa Claus Is Coming To Town"

== Personnel ==
- Orchestration – Leonidas Tzitzos
- Keys – Leonidas Tzitzos
- Sound Record – Kostis Pirenis, Tasos Chamosfakidis at Workshop
- Mixing – Dimitris (diji) Chorianopoulos at Workshop
- Drums – Dimitris Chorianopoulos
- Guitar – Spiros Spiliotopoulos
- Vocals – Elena Patroklou
- Featuring – The Spiros Lambrou choir
- Photographer – Pavlos Euthimiou
- Hair styling – Stefanos Vasilakis
- Make up – Grigoris Pirpilis
- Styling – Iris Leontari
- Photo editing – Malvina Markopoulou
- Artwork – Antonis Glikos
