= Ivi Adamou =

Greek Cypriot singer (born 1993)

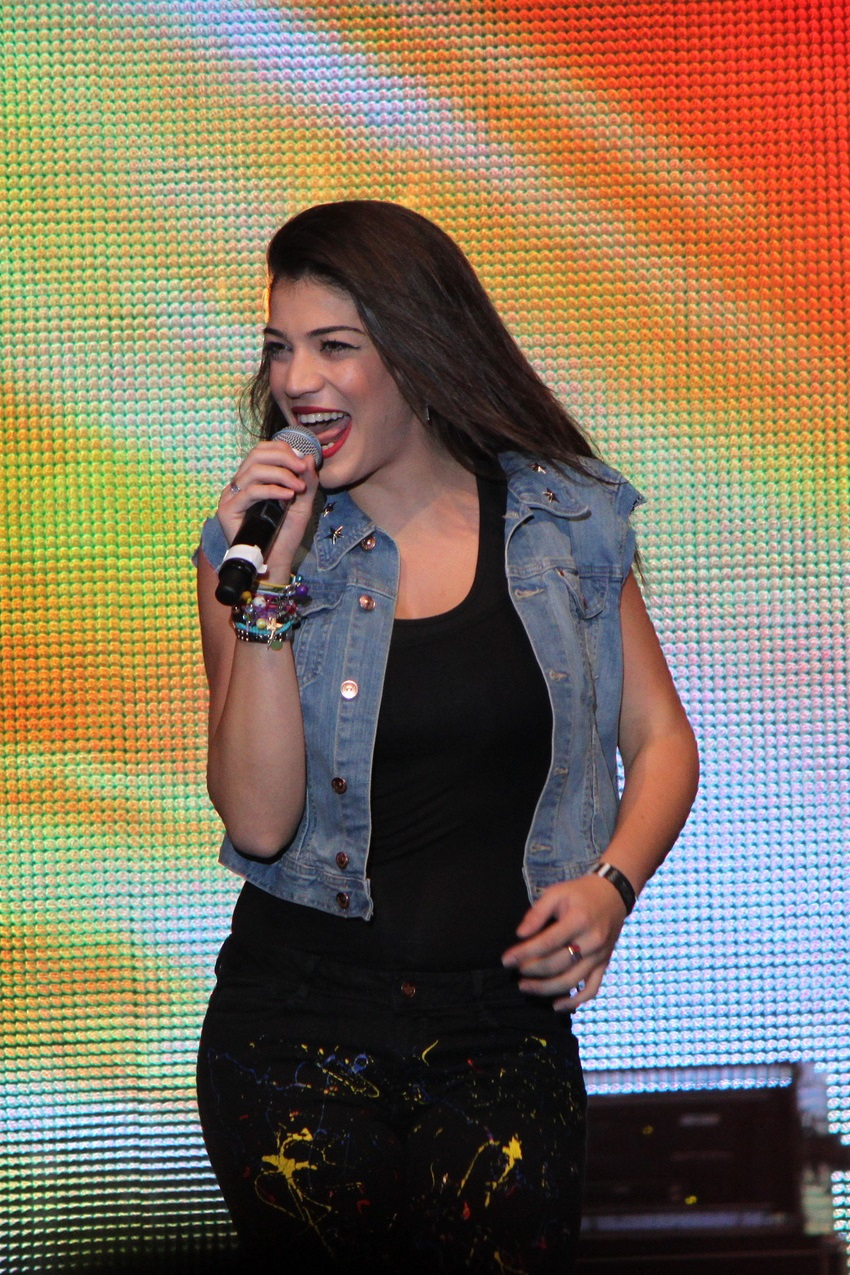
- Adamou at the Stockholm Pride in 2012
- Born: 24 November 1993 (age 32); Agia Napa, Cyprus
- Occupations: Singer; songwriter; actress
- Partner: Michalis Kouinelis
- Children: 1
- Musical career
- Genres: Pop; dance
- Instruments: Vocals; piano
- Years active: 2009–present
- Labels: Panik Records; Minos EMI

Ivi Adamou (Greek: Ήβη Αδάμου, IPA: [ˈivi aˈðamu]; born 24 November 1993) is a Greek Cypriot singer. Born and raised in Agia Napa, she rose to recognition in Greece and Cyprus following her participation in the second season of the Greek version of The X Factor, where she was under the mentorship of Giorgos Theofanous. Right after her elimination from the X Factor, Adamou secured a recording contract with Sony Music Greece. She gained further recognition from her participation in the Eurovision Song Contest 2012, where she represented Cyprus with the song "La La Love".

Her debut extended play Kalokairi Stin Kardia (2010) was released shortly after her contract with Sony. The same year, she collaborated with the Spiros Lambrou Choir and released the holiday extended play Christougenna Me Tin Ivi Adamou (2010) and was released as Christmas with Ivi Adamou abroad. Her debut studio album San Ena Oniro (2011) was released in July 2011 and included the hit singles "Krata Ta Matia Sou Klista", "Kano Mia Efhi" and "Voltes St Asteria". A new album, Eho Ourano, was scheduled to be released in summer of 2013 but was never released. Her second studio album Diko Mou will be released on 28 November 2022. Adamou has also released songs for movies such as Barbie in A Mermaid Tale and Barbie: A Fashion Fairytale. In 2015, she made her theatrical debut when she starred in the original musical Barbarella: the 80's Musical.

Influenced by Beyoncé, Whitney Houston and Helena Paparizou, Adamou was often described as the "Pop Queen" or the "Teen Idol" in Greece and was since her participation in The X Factor called as the "Next Big Thing". Her first extended play was certified gold for selling over 60,000 copies in Greece while the second holiday extended play was certified platinum for selling over 15,000 copies in Portugal. Since 2010, Adamou had several nominations in both the MAD Video Music Awards and the Madame Figaro Awards. She was named the best Cypriot female performer in 2010 and 2012. She was also awarded as the best singer in Cyprus in 2012 which was the first time that the award was given. Adamou has also participated in several charities such as "Everything I Can", the campaign for the prevention of cervical cancer, and she was also appointed as the Young Ambassador for the rights of the children by the HFC-UNCRC Policy Center.

== Biography and career ==
=== Early life ===
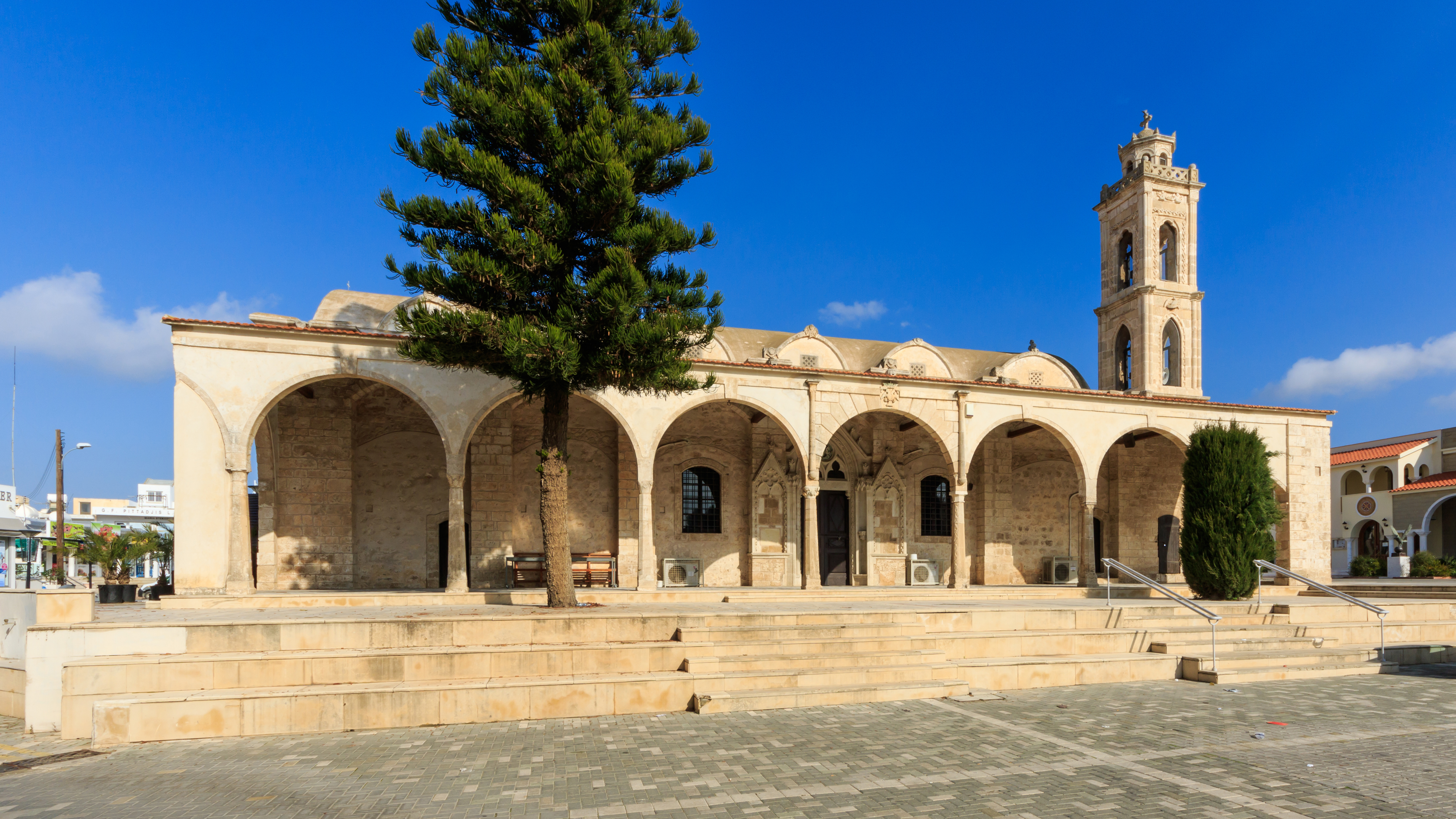
Adamou grew up in Paralimni.

Ivi Adamou was born on 24 November 1993 in Paralimni, Famagusta, to a Greek Cypriot father and a Bulgarian mother. She is one of the three children of her family; she has two sisters, one older and one younger. At the age of 9, she got on the stage for first time and participated in a music competition where she competed with the song "Kaka Paidia" by Anna Vissi and managed to win the competition. Since that competition, she started music theory, vocal lessons, and piano which allowed her to acquire the suitable skills to win prizes in several local song competitions.

At the age of 15 and during her second year at the lyceum, Adamou auditioned for The X Factor and as she managed to make it through the live shows, she had to be travelling from Cyprus to Greece. Following her participation in the second series of the Greek version of the X Factor, she signed a contract with Sony Music Greece. Even though she had started a musical career, she decided to study sociology at the Panteion University. She graduated and received her diploma in 2015.

=== 2009–10: The X Factor ===
Between 2009 and 2010, Adamou took part in the second series of the Greek version of The X Factor, ending in sixth place. During her time on the show, she listed Beyoncé as her biggest influence, as well as Christina Aguilera and Whitney Houston. Nearly all the songs she performed during the show were in the English language with only one of them being in the Greek language.

Adamou sang "Just Dance" on the first live show and she received positive reviews by the judges. In the second and third live show, she sang P!nk's "Just Like A Pill" and Kelly's "Because of You" respectively and she once again received positive reviews with the latter one being honoured as one of the best performances in the show until then. However, with her performance of "Papa Don't Preach" by Madonna in the fourth live show she received negative reviews, with Nikos Mouratidis stating that the song didn't suit to her voice. For the next three live shows, she performed "When I Grow Up", "Hurt" and "Halo" and despite her unsuccessful performance in the fourth live show, they were positively reviewed by the judges. On the eighth live she performed her first Greek song, "Hristougenna" along with "All I Want For Christmas Is You".

On the ninth live show Adamou performed "Celebration", making it the second song of Madonna that she performed. She also had a duet with her teammate, Nini; the two performed Anna Vissi's "Dodeka". On the tenth live show she performed "I Love Rock 'n' Roll" and even though she received mostly positive reviews, Mouratidis had negative opinion on the performance just like he did on her previous performance. On the eleventh live show, she performed another song from the Pussycat Dolls, "Hush Hush". For first time, Adamou was in bottom two with Hovig but she was saved by the judges. In the final showdown, she chose to perform "I Have Nothing", the song she sang in the bootcamp.

On the twelfth live show, she performed for second time, a song from Christina Aguilera. Even though she was one of the favourites to win, she was eliminated during the twelfth week, where she came at bottom two against her teammate Nini Shermandini. She was voted to stay in by George Levendis and Nikos Mouratidis and Nini was voted by Katerina Gagaki and George Theofanous. Even though it was tied, Theofanous' vote counted twice and therefore Adamou was eliminated. After her elimination, a feud started between Adamou's label Sony and Theofanous; the record label wanted Adamou to return because of the fake results, as stated by the media.

The X Factor season 2 performances and results
Show	Theme	Song choice	Original artist	Order	Result
Auditions	Contestant's choice	—N/a		—N/a	Advanced
Bootcamp	Contestant's choice	"Just Walk Away"	Céline Dion	—N/a	Advanced
Bootcamp	Contestant's choice	"I Have Nothing"	Whitney Houston	—N/a	Advanced
Judge's house	Contestant's choice	"Irreplaceable"	Beyoncé	—N/a	Advanced
Judge's house	Contestant's choice	"Oti Oneirevomoun"	Despina Vandi	—N/a	Advanced
Judge's house	Contestant's choice	"To Fos Sti Psyhi"	Elena Paparizou	—N/a	Advanced
Live show 1	Mentor's choice	"Just Dance"	Lady Gaga	4	Safe
Live show 2	Mentor's choice	"Just Like a Pill"	Pink	9	Safe
Live show 3	Mentor's choice	"Because of You"	Kelly Clarkson	7	Safe
Live show 4	1980s music	"Papa Don't Preach"	Madonna	8	Safe
Live show 5	Mentor's choice	"When I Grow Up"	Pussycat Dolls	7	Safe
Live show 6	Mentor's choice	"Hurt"	Christina Aguilera	5	Safe
Live show 7	Mentor's choice	"Halo"	Beyoncé	3	Safe
Live show 8	Mentor's choice	"All I Want for Christmas Is You" / "Christouyenna"	Mariah Carey / Despina Vandi	2	Safe
Live show 8	Duet with Stavento	"Mesa Sou" (with Stavento)	Stavento	—	Safe
Live show 9	Mentor's choice	"Celebration"	Madonna	1	Safe
Live show 9	Duet with contestant	"Dodeka" (with Nini)	Anna Vissi	—	Safe
Live show 10	Mentor's choice	"I Love Rock 'n' Roll"	Arrows / Joan Jett / Britney Spears	1	Safe
Live show 11	Mentor's choice	"Hush Hush"	Pussycat Dolls	2	Bottom two
Live show 11	Contestant's choice	"I Have Nothing"	Mariah Carey	2	Bottom two
Live show 12	Mentor's choice	"The Voice Within"	Christina Aguilera	3	Eliminated
Live show 12	Duet with contestant	"S Agapo" (with 48 Ores)	Antonis Remos and Alkistis Protopsalti	—	Eliminated
Live show 12	Contestant's choice	"The Power of Love"	Jennifer Rush	2	Eliminated

=== 2010–11: Kalokairi Stin Kardia, San Ena Oniro and tours ===
While Adamou was not a finalist in The X Factor with her sixth-place finish, she managed to obtain a record deal with Sony Music Greece, an affiliate of the show. Her elimination from the show was the source of a dispute between representatives of Sony Music Greece and George Theofanous, Adamou's mentor on the show. Her first single, "A*G*A*P*I" was released just a few days after her elimination from the show. She performed the song for first time at Aksizei Na To Deis (It's Worth to Watch), a show of ANT1. Its music video was released on 22 March 2010. She also performed the song as a guest performer during the final of The X Factor. Following her debut single, Adamou released the Greek version of the Barbie in A Mermaid Tale soundtrack.

On 13 April 2010, Adamou's first collaboration was released through the MAD TV; she was featured on Stavento's song "San Erthi I Mera" which became a summer hit in Greece and Cyprus. In less than three months, the song got more than 3 million views in the original video which was later taken down which made it one of the most viewed Greek music videos at that time. The song stayed in the top five of the Greek Airplay Chart for 20 weeks, and sold 60 thousand legal downloads. Her second single, "Sose Me", was released on 27 April 2010 with its video clip premiering on 5 May 2010. A few days later, teasers for Adamou's debut extended play were revealed. Meanwhile, Adamou started touring in Greece and Cyprus along with Stavento. On 14 June 2010, Adamou performed at the 2010 MAD Video Music Awards with the band OtherView, a cover of the song "Last Kiss", originally by Ishtar.

The X Factor was like a school for me. It helped me get directed and decide on what genre I will continue working on for my career.

— Adamou on The X Factor

Adamou's debut extended play, Kalokairi Stin Kardia, was released in June 2010 and included her first two singles, "A*G*A*P*I" and "Sose Me". Adamou recorded, for second time, the Greek version for a Barbie soundtrack; Barbie: A Fashion Fairy Tale. On 29 July 2010, a contest started through the official website to select the third single of the album; either "To Mistiko Mou Na Vris" or "Gelaei" would be the third single. Apart from select the next single, the voters had the chance to watch the shooting of the video clip. "To Mistiko Mou Na Vris" was announced on 30 August 2010 as the third single and the shooting for the video started in September, while the video premiered on 13 October 2010.

Adamou's first EP was certified gold for shipments of more than six thousand units. She received her gold album from Sakis Rouvas right after her performance of "To Mistiko Mou Na Vris" in the second live show of the third season of The X Factor. On 28 October 2010, it was announced that Adamou would release a Christmas EP which would include covers of "Santa Claus Is Coming to Town", "Last Christmas", "White Christmas" and a medley of "Agia Nihta" and "We Wish You a Merry Christmas". Christougenna me tin Ivi Adamou (released as Christmas with Ivi Adamou abroad) was released on 22 November 2010. The EP peaked at the first place of the Greek iTunes while it was certified double platinum in Portugal for selling more than fifty thousands units.

In early 2011, Adamou admitted that she got proposition from Hellenic Broadcasting Corporation (ERT) to represent Greece in the Eurovision Song Contest 2011 which she turned down stating that even if she's interested in participating, she wants to finish school. In March 2011, she started working on her first studio album. In April 2011, Adamou collaborated with Melisses in the song written by the band, "Krata Ta Matia Sou Klista". Both the song and the music video premiered on 23 April 2013. In May 2011, it was announced that Adamou would release a song named "Murderous" which caused tension between Adamou's and Paparizou's fans as the song was previously announced as Paparizou's song. The song was later included in Adamou's first studio album as a Greek-language song titled "Tis Agapis Ta Thimata".

On 14 June 2011, Adamou attended the 2011 MAD Video Music Awards and performed with Midenistis a remix of the song "Gonna Make You Sweat (Everybody Dance Now)". That year, she received her first nominations at the MAD Video Music Awards; she was nominated for the Best New Artist and Best Female Artist. She was also nominated for the Best Hip Hop/Urban, Best Duet and Best Video Clip for the song with Stavento, "San Erthi I Mera". She won the award for the Best Hip Hop/Urban song.

In June 2011, a video teasing the new album entitled San Ena Oniro was shared through Adamou's channel. The first single from the album was "Kano Mia Efhi" written and produced by Meth. The shooting for the music video started in July and premiered on 29 July 2011. Her first studio album, San Ena Oniro, was released on 25 July 2011 and included ten songs. "Voltes St Asteria" was announced as the second single of the album on 25 August 2011. A teaser of its music video was revealed on 5 October 2011 and premiered on 11 October 2011. In August 2011, she joined Panos Kiamos and Kostas Martakis at their residency concert in the Posidonio Music Hall.

=== 2012–14: Eurovision Song Contest ===
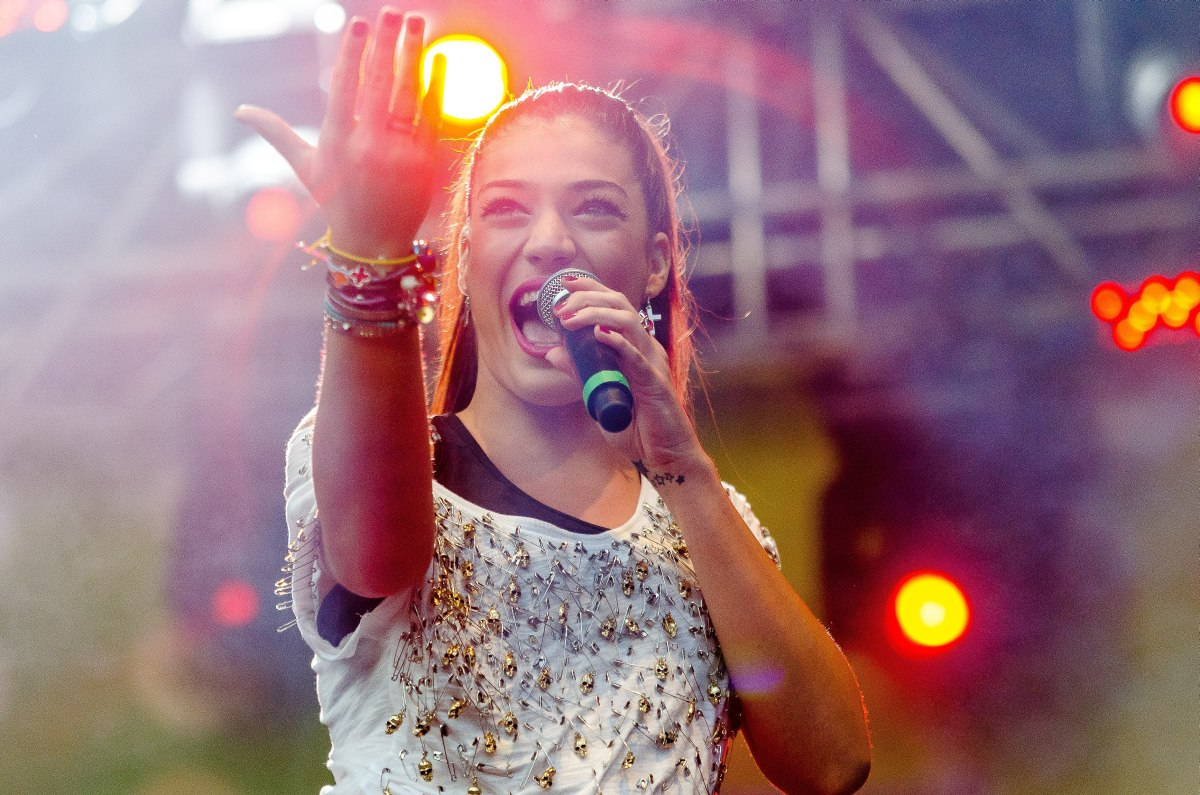
Adamou at Rix FM Festival in Växjö

In early August 2011, Adamou was rumoured to represent Cyprus in the Eurovision Song Contest 2012. Following the conclusion of her appearances at Posidonio, Adamou started touring around Europe to promote her song of the Eurovision Song Contest 2012. Following the contest, Adamou started the La La Love Tour and toured in countries including Sweden, Greece, and Spain. In January 2012, the Cyprus Broadcasting Corporation (CyBC) published the songs that Adamou would perform in the selection; "Call the Police", "La La Love" and "You Don't Belong Here". On 6 August 2011, CyBC officially announced that Adamou was internally selected to represent the country in the contest. The national final took place on 25 January 2012 where "La La Love" was declared as the winner and therefore the Cypriot entry in the Eurovision Song Contest 2012. A month before the contest, it was reported that Cyprus could be disqualified due to not having the funds from the House of Representatives. In response to this fact, Adamou reportedly said: "[...] I am optimistic that not only we'll be in Baku, but we'll also have a great procedure". During the contest, Adamou was reunited with fellow The X Factor contestant Eleftheria Eleftheriou who represented Greece. At the running order draw, Cyprus was drawn to perform 12th in the first semi-final on 22 May 2012 and then successfully reached the final where it was drawn to perform 8th and ultimately finished in 16th place. "La La Love" entered the single charts in many European countries, including Spain, the United Kingdom, Germany and Sweden. "La La Love" along with the other national final songs were included in the euro edition of San Ena Oniro with an additional Greek version of "You Don't Belong Here" titled "Fotia Vrohi".

After Eurovision, Adamou had a summer tour with concerts in Greece, Cyprus, Sweden and Spain. In Spain, she recorded "Time to Love" with Marsal Ventura, a Spanish DJ. When she returned to Greece she recorded another song called "Ase Me" (Greek: Ασε με; English: Let me) with Kleopatra from hip-hop group Stavento. The music was created by METH, EY.O. and the lyrics by METH and MAGEDA. On 14 January 2013, on an appearance on Mega Channel's program Proino Mou, she announced that she would be releasing a new album in February 2013, but the album was not released during that time. She also announced through her Facebook page that her new song with Marsal Ventura, "Time to Love", would be released in early February. Stavento posted a backstage photo from the shooting of their new song with Adamou named "Na Sou Tragoudo" which was released on 4 March 2013 and was available for digital download on 11 March 2013.

Adamou renewed her co-operation with Sony Music Greece on 5 April 2013. She revealed during her interview at MTV that her new album would have the title Eho Ourano (I Have Sky). Her next single, released on 31 May 2013, was titled "Ponane Oi Agapes" (Loves Hurt). For a fourth consecutive year, Adamou performed at the MAD Video Music Awards with Anise K and Shaya the song "Walking on Air". As Sony Music Greece was shut down, her album's release was cancelled. In January 2014, Adamou announced during one of her concerts that she would be returning with a new song after the small "break". She also revealed that the release of the song would be special. On 4 April 2014, Adamou appeared at the 2014 MadWalk along with Elisavet Spanou and Courtney Parker, where they all performed "Sway" for the Red Dress Act.

Following the first season of The Voice of Greece, the kid's version of the show was announced with Adamou being speculated as one of the coaches along with Demy due to both being young singers. On 3 June 2014, it was confirmed by Adamou and Kouinelis that the two would be performing a duet for the 2014 MAD Video Music Awards. On the ceremony that took place on 23 June and was broadcast on 2 July, Adamou and Kouinelis performed "Na Sou Tragoudo" as well as remix of "Min Tis to Pis" along with Kostas Tournas. Adamou started her summer tour with Stavento in August and performed in several places in Greece and Cyprus. On 17 October 2014, it was reported that Adamou received a proposition from Cyprus Broadcasting Corporation to host the Cypriot national selection for the 2015 Contest. However, it was later announced by CyBC that Antri Karantoni would be presenting the selection. In December 2014, Adamou joined her second residency show along with Kostas Tournas, Kostas Karafotis and Violeta Dagkalou.

=== 2015–16: Digital singles, 80's The Musical and tours ===
After reaching one billion views, the official YouTube channel of the Eurovision Song Contest published a video with the top 10 most watched Eurovision songs with Adamou's "La La Love" being on sixth place with more than 30 million views, the second most watched 2012 song after Loreen's "Euphoria". On 4 May 2015, Adamou published a photo on her Facebook page with her being in a studio, teasing the release of new music. Adamou was confirmed to perform for the designer Gregory Morfi in the 2015 Cyprus MadWalk among other performers such as Despina Vandi, Demy and Eleftheria Eleftheriou. On 14 May 2015, during the show for the 2015 Cyprus MadWalk, she performed "La La Love" and a cover version of "Lady (Hear Me Tonight)" by Modjo.

On 25 May 2015, she was announced to be part of the Eurovision Cruise, an annual event organized by OGAE Finland, along with Sanna Nielsen and Sonia. In June 2015, she started her summer tour with the Greek band Miss Cherry. She confirmed during an interview with Eurovision Radio International that her new single would be released in October and that she would be a part of a musical in Athens. The musical was later revealed to be the original musical Barbarella: the 80's Musical and that she would star as Evi, a Greek-American teenager. The musical also starred Katy Garbi and Eleni Foureira and would premiere on 28 October in the Pireos 131 Theater in Athens. The musical's premiere was postponed and premiered on 7 November 2015 instead. The musical received generally favorable reviews and Adamou was praised for both her acting and singing skills in the musical. It was revealed that since late November 2015 she would part of the Fever residency show with Nikos Oikonomopoulos and Christos Cholidis. The show made its premiere on 27 November 2015, and concluded on 19 March 2016 while a new show started at Fix Live in Thessaloniki for a limited number of appearances between 25 March 2016 and 23 April 2016.

More than two years after her last single release "Ponane Oi Agapes", Adamou confirmed through her Instagram account that a new song and music video would be released. During an interview to TLife!, she revealed the title of the single to be "Tipota De Mas Stamata" (Nothing Stops Us). The song was written and composed by Michalis Kouinelis and the first teaser of the song was released on 15 January 2016. Adamou was featured on Stavento's "Mi Staksi Ke Mi Vreksi" from their fifth studio album Akoma Onirevome (2016). The song marked their third collaboration on a song with the first two being "San Erthi I Mera" and "Na Sou Tragoudo". On 18 July 2016, Adamou released "Akou Sopa", a remake of the 2010 song "Un Bonito Final", originally by the Spanish group Los Rebujitos.

=== 2017–21: Residencies and Jesus Christ Superstar ===
In December 2016, Adamou joined Myronas Stratis and Isaias Matiaba for a special holiday residency show at Stavros tou Notou in Athens on Christmas Eve, Christmas Day and New Year's Day. The three later continued their cooperation for a full residency in the venue since 21 January 2017. The show was well received and Adamou was praised for her performance in the show. Adamou announced the release of a new song by posting a photo from the shooting of its music video. During an interview on the ANT1 talk show The 2Night Show, a short clip from Adamou's new song was shown. The teaser was officially released on 6 March 2017 along with the title of the song, "Afto Ton Kero", while the full song was released on 10 March 2017.

Adamou was announced to be part of the residency in Athinon Arena along with headliners Antonis Remos and Eleni Foureira. The show premiered on 15 December 2017 and would run throughout the next months on Fridays and Saturdays. In October 2017, it was revealed that Adamou would star in the Greek production of the rock musical Jesus Christ Superstar. The production premiered in February 2018 and she portrayed Mary Magdalene for the first shows; however she was later replaced by Antigoni Psihrami for a number of shows due to Adamou's pregnancy.

In October 2018, Adamou was officially signed to Panik Records. In late 2018, Adamou was announced to be part of a residency along with Marinella, Kostas Makedonas and Elena Paparizou at Pyli A in Thessaloniki. The show made its premiere on 17 November 2018, and would last until 20 January 2019. On 23 November 2018, a teaser for Adamou's new song with Stavento was published. "Diko Mou" was officially released on 1 December 2018, marking the first release of the singer under her new label, Panik Records. The song became a hit in both Greece and Cyprus, peaking at number 8 in the Greek charts. Following the success of the residency at Pyli A, it was announced that the show would move to Athens and Diogenis Studio for a limited number of shows, with the same line-up. The show started on 9 February 2019, and took place every Saturday and Sunday with a total of 10 shows.

On 10 May 2019, it was announced that Adamou would be joining Konstantinos Argiros for a residency at Fantasia Live, starting on 24 May 2019. The two singers also made several other appearances across Greece and Cyprus other than the concerts at Fantasia. She continued appearing in the residency for the 2019–20 season, with Stan joining Adamou and Argyros. In November 2019, Adamou released the song "Pao" featuring Konnie Metaxa with whom she also collaborated at the time during the Fantasia residency. Adamou continued her collaborations with the release of "Fotia Mou" in November 2020 and featured Giorgos Mazonakis.

At the 2021 Madame Figaro Awards, Adamou received the award for Musician of the Year for the third time. On 4 June 2021, Adamou released another collaboration with Stavento, titled "Gia Sena". In October 2021, Adamou was set to collaborate with Nikos Oikonomopoulos once again for a residency in Fantasia, along with Petros Iakovidis. Due to its success, the residency was extended and the three artists continued their appearances through 2022.

=== 2022–present: Diko Mou ===
In March 2022, Adamou released the song "Agoraki Mou" – the song was written by Petros Iakovidis who previously worked with Adamou during their residency at Fantasia. She was also featured in Stelios Rokkos new album Anasa; they performed the song "Emeis" together. In June, she embarked on her Summer 2022 tour across Greece and Cyprus. Adamou was revealed to be returning for another residency in Vogue, continuing her appearances with Nikos Oikonomopoulos following their Fantasia residency. The residency made its premiered on 9 September 2022 and lasted until 30 October 2022. On 18 October 2022, she released another single titled "Rikse Me". Following the conclusion of the residency in Vogue, she started appearing in Box Athens with Dionisis Schinas. Her second studio album titled Diko Mou was released on 28 November 2022.

== Artistry ==
=== Style and influences ===
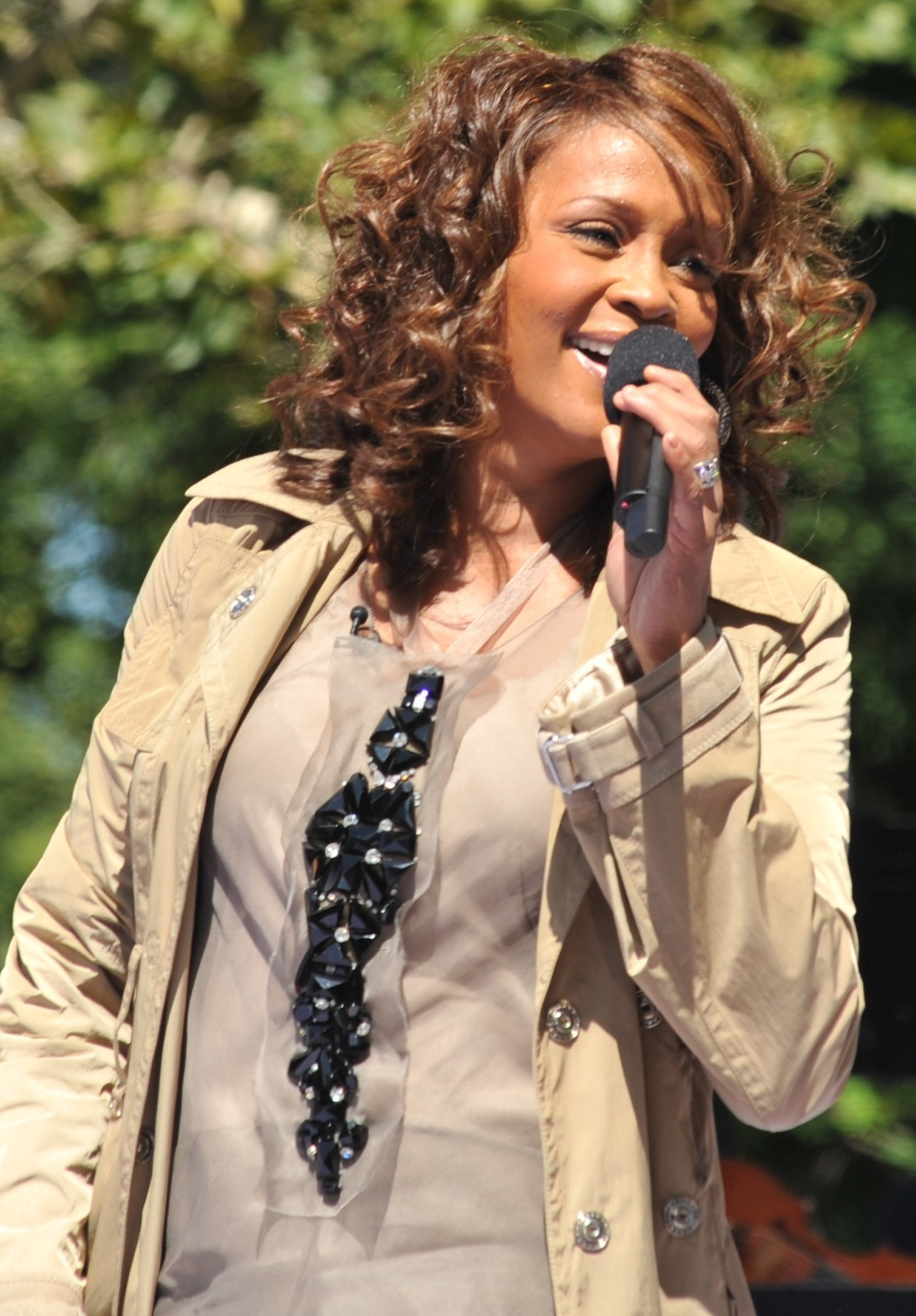
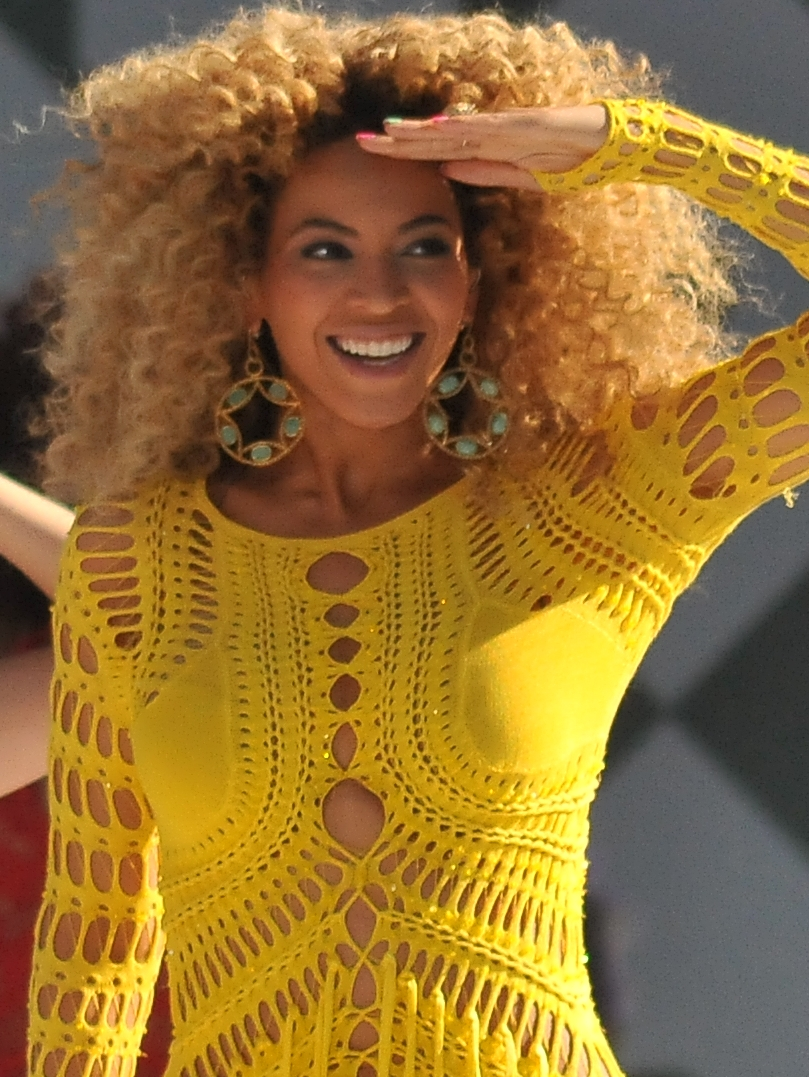
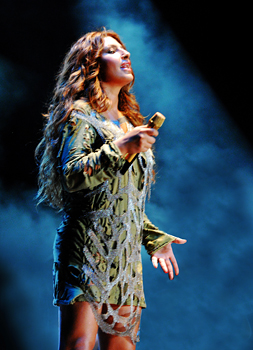
Whitney Houston (left), Beyoncé (middle) and Elena Paparizou (right) are some of Adamou's influences.

Since her appearance in the X Factor, Adamou has been performing pop songs. Although almost all the song she performed in the competition were in English, the songs she later released for her discography were mostly in Greek. As she said in an interview, she is influenced by both the Greek and American pop music. Adamou was often named as the "Next Big Thing" or the "Teen Idol" in Greece following the release of her first extended play. The album had a more teen pop style while her debut studio album adopted a more "mature" pop style.

Adamou has named Beyoncé, Christina Aguilera and Whitney Houston as her biggest influences in her music career.

Since a child I've listened to Whitney Houston and I admire Beyoncé for her hard work. Every time she [Beyoncé] has an appearance, she tends to have the best result which shows how much she has worked to reach the perfect.

Adamou has also cited Elena Paparizou and Sakis Rouvas as her influences with the latter one coming close to him during The X Factor where Sakis was the host. She has said [about Sakis] that she wasn't a big fan of him before the show, but she admired him when she met and got to know more about him and his personality.

== Personal life ==
Adamou is the second child in her family; she has one older sister, Despina, and one younger, Cleopatra. She was born and raised in Ayia Napa, Cyprus. During her participation in The X Factor she had to travel back and forth from Cyprus to Greece. In 2011, she started studying sociology at Panteion University, in Athens where she moved permanently. In July 2015, four years later, she graduated and got her diploma at the Department of Sociology of Panteion.

I'm not hiding anything. With Ivi, we have been in relationship for about a year, not for four or five years like it was said.

— Kouinelis on his relationship with Adamou

In 2011, when asked about her relationship status, Adamou said that she was not in any relationship despite the rumors that she was in relationship with Michalis Kouinelis from Stavento. Later, in one interview, she denied the rumours. In 2014, Kouinelis revealed that Adamou and he were in a relationship for about a year, and denied the rumours of a longer relationship. The two lived together in Athens as Adamou had been studying there. It was reported in late-April 2014 that after Kouinelis met the parents of Adamou, the two would soon get married. In December 2017, it was announced by Adamou that she was expecting her first child. The same month Adamou moved with Kouinelis in his hometown Alexandroupolis. On 12 June 2018, she gave birth to her first child, a daughter named Anatoli-Nefeli.

=== Charitable work ===
Adamou has participated in several charities. In 2010, she was part of the Cypriot campaign "Everything I Can" for the prevention of cervical cancer. The same year, she took part in the Greek campaign against breast cancer along with other Greeks including Katia Dandoulaki, Zeta Makripoulia and Dimitra Galani. In 2011, Adamou was appointed as the Young Ambassador for the rights of the children by the HFC-UNCRC Policy Center. As the ambassador of the organization, she performed at the campaign "Beat Bullying" on 27 January 2012 and the incoming of the concert would be donated to the organization's campaign. In 2013, she performed at the solidarity concert in Famagusta to collect food. In December 2013, she took part in a Christmas Concert organised by the Cypriot radio station Super FM and Giorgos Theofanous along with artists including Elena Paparizou, Eleni Foureira, Demy and Kostas Martakis. The money that were raised from the concert's tickets were given to Radiomarathonios. The performers, apart from their own songs, performed a Christmas song each along with Theofanous' choir. The songs were included in an album that was released along with a Cypriot newspaper. Adamou performed a cover of Mariah Carey's "All I Want For Christmas is You".

== Discography ==
=== Studio albums ===
- San Ena Oniro (2011)
- Diko Mou (2022)

=== Extended plays ===
- Kalokairi Stin Kardia (2010)
- Christmas with Ivi Adamou (2010)

== Filmography ==
Adamou has appeared on several TV shows and awards including her participation on the second season of The X Factor and the Eurovision Song Contest 2012. In 2015 and 2016, she starred in Barbarella: the 80's Musical.

=== Films ===
Year	Title	Role	Notes
2010	Barbie in A Mermaid Tale	Merliah Summers	Greek voice-dubbing, singing voice
2010	Barbie: A Fashion Fairytale	Barbie	Greek voice-dubbing, singing voice

=== Television ===
Year	Title	Role	Notes
2009–10	The X Factor	Herself	Contestant; 6th place (Season 2)
2010	Madame Figaro Awards	Herself	Performer
2010	Dancing with the Stars	Herself	Guest star (Season 1, Episode 13)
2010	The X Factor	Herself	Performer (Season 3, Live Show 2)
2010	MAD Video Music Awards	Herself	Performer
2011	Dancing with the Stars	Herself	Guest star (Season 2, Episode 13)
2011	MAD Video Music Awards	Herself	Performer; Award for Best Video Clip Hip Hop/Urban
2012	A Song for Ivi Adamou	Herself	Contestant; internal selection
2012	Eurovision Song Contest	Herself	Contestant; 16th place
2012	MAD Video Music Awards	Herself	Performer; Award for Cyprus Artist of the Year
2012	Madame Figaro Awards	Herself	Performer
2013	Eurosong 2013 – a MAD show	Herself	Performer
2013	MAD Video Music Awards	Herself	Performer
2014	MadWalk 2014	Herself	Performer
2014	MAD Video Music Awards	Herself	Performer
2015	Cyprus MadWalk 2015	Herself	Performer
2016	Cyprus MadWalk 2016	Herself	Performer
2017	Cyprus MadWalk 2017	Herself	Performer
2019	MadWalk 2019	Herself	Performer
2019	MAD Video Music Awards	Herself	Performer
2020	The Final Four	Herself	Performer
2020	MadWalk 2020	Herself	Performer
2021	MAD Video Music Awards	Herself	Performer
2021	MadWalk 2021	Herself	Performer
2022	MAD Video Music Awards	Herself	Performer
2022	The X Factor	Herself	Performer (Season 7, Semi-final)

=== Theater ===
Year	Title	Role	Notes
2015–16	Barbarella: the 80's Musical	Evi Pappa	Pireos 131 Theater
2018	Jesus Christ Superstar	Mary Magdalene	Akropol Theatre

== Awards and nominations ==
Adamou's debut extended play was certified gold for selling over 60,000 copies. Her second extended play, Christmas with Ivi Adamou, was certified double platinum in Portugal for selling over 50,000 copies. Her first studio album San Ena Oniro was released in July 2011 and peaked at the 17th place in the Greek album charts. Her single "La La Love" became a success after competing in the Eurovision Song Contest 2012 and was charted in the European countries including Sweden, Spain and the United Kingdom.

She had several nominations at the MAD Video Music Awards since 2011. She won two awards, for the best video clip urban and the best Cypriot artist. She was also nominated three years in a row at the Madame Figaro Awards for the best Cypriot woman singer and won two of them, in 2010 and 2012. In 2013, her song with Marsal Ventura, "Time to Love" won the Spanish awards, LaLore02 Awards, for the best song of the year.

== Tours and concerts ==
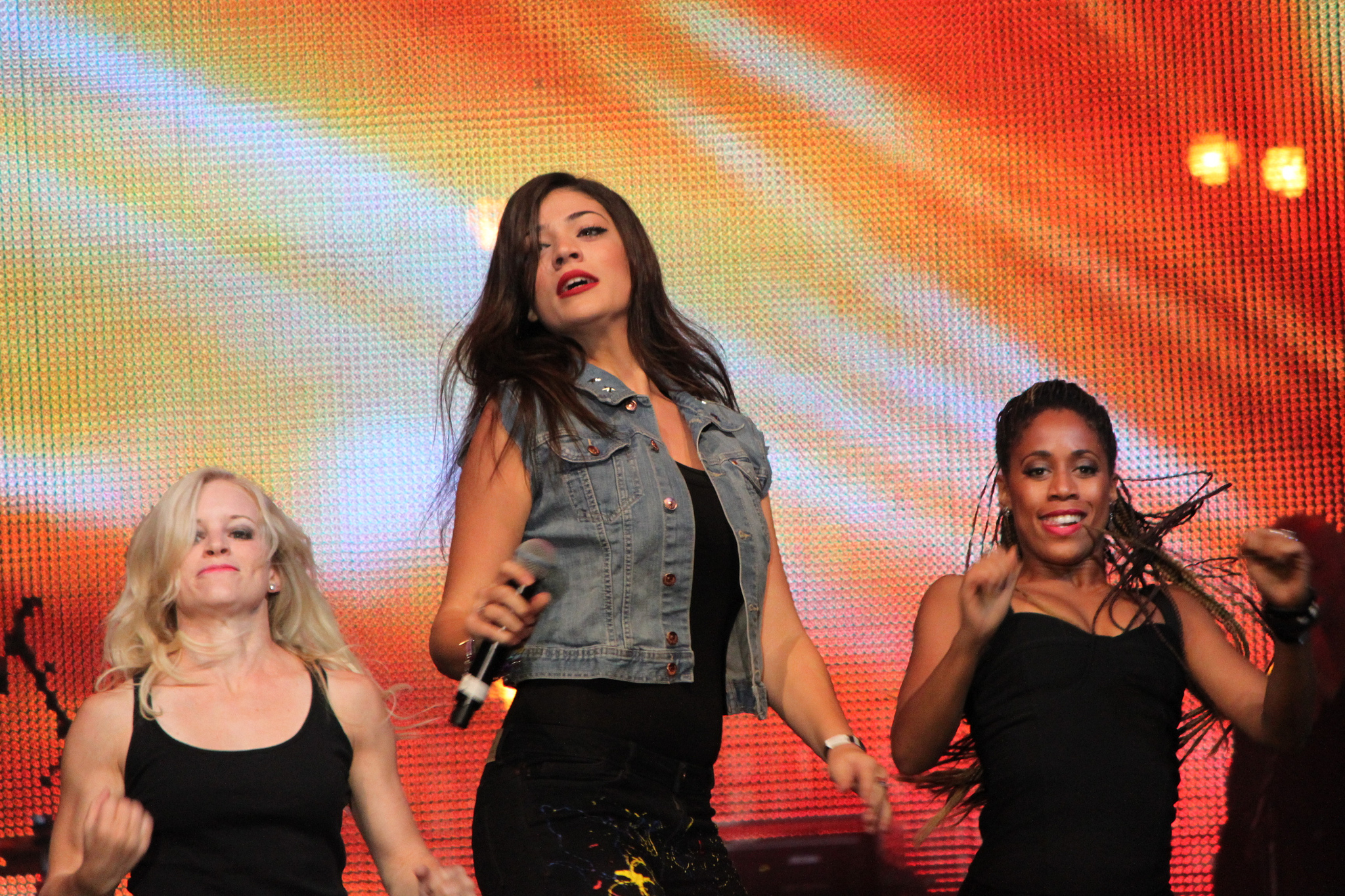
Adamou in the La La Love Tour.

Since her debut in 2009, Adamou had several tours including her Eurovision 2012 promotion tour. Since 2011 – and more actively since 2014 – she has been part of several residency concerts in Greece. Her residency concerts include appearances with famous Greek singers such as Elena Paparizou, Konstantinos Argyros, Eleni Foureira and Marinella among others.

=== Concert tours ===
- Stavento & Ivi Adamou: Live Tour (2010)
- Melisses & Ivi Adamou: Live Tour (2011)
- Eurovision Promo Tour (2012)
- La La Love Tour (2012)
- Summer Tour (2013)
- Summer Tour (2014)
- Ivi Adamou & Miss Cherry: Summer Tour (2015)
- Summer Tour (2022)

=== Residency concerts ===
- Posidonio Music Hall (Athens) – Adamou with Panos Kiamos and Kostas Martakis (2011–12)
- Perivoli Tou Ouranou (Athens) – Adamou with Kostas Karafotis, Kostas Tournas and Violeta Dagkalou (2014–15)
- Fever (Athens) – Adamou with Nikos Oikonomopoulos and Christos Cholidis (2015–16)
- Fix Live (Thessaloniki) – Adamou with Nikos Oikonomopoulos and Christos Cholidis (2016)
- Stavros tou Notou (Athens) – Adamou with Myronas Stratis and Isaias Matiaba (2016–17)
- Athinon Arena (Athens) – Adamou with Antonis Remos and Eleni Foureira (2017–18)
- Pyli A (Thessaloniki) – Adamou with Marinella, Kostas Makedonas, Helena Paparizou and Tsachourides Brothers (2018–19)
- Diogenis Studio (Athens) – Adamou with Marinella, Kostas Makedonas, Helena Paparizou and Tsachourides Brothers (2019)
- Fantasia (Athens) – Adamou with Konstantinos Argyros, Alcatrash and Ian Stratis (2019)
- Fantasia (Athens) – Adamou with Konstantinos Argyros and Stan (2019–20)
- Vogue (Thessaloniki) – Adamou with Konstantinos Argyros and Petros Iakovidis (2020)
- Fantasia (Athens) – Adamou with Nikos Oikonomopoulos and Petros Iakovidis (2021–22)
- Vogue (Thessaloniki) – Adamou with Nikos Oikonomopoulos and Giorgos Livanis (2022)
- Box (Athens) – Adamou with Dionysis Schinas (2022)

Achievements
Preceded by Christos Mylordos with "San Aggelos S'agapisa"	Cyprus in the Eurovision Song Contest; 2012	Succeeded by Despina Olympiou with "An Me Thimase"
