= La La Love =

2012 single by Ivi Adamou

Single by Ivi Adamou

from the album San Ena Oniro (Euro Edition)
- Released: 31 January 2012
- Recorded: 2012
- Genre: Dance-pop; electropop; eurodance
- Length: 3:02
- Label: Sony Music Greece; Day 1
- Songwriters: Alex Papaconstantinou; Björn Djupström; Alexandra Zakka; Viktor Svensson
- Producer: Victory (Viktor Svensson)

Ivi Adamou singles chronology
"Voltes St Asteria" (2011)	"La La Love" (2012)	"Madness" (2012)

Eurovision Song Contest 2012 entry
- Country: Cyprus
- Artist: Ivi Adamou
- Language: English

Finals performance
- Semi-final result: 7th
- Semi-final points: 91
- Final result: 16th
- Final points: 65

Entry chronology
- ◄ "San Aggelos S' Agapisa" (2011)
- "An Me Thimase" (2013) ►

"La La Love" is a song by Greek Cypriot singer Ivi Adamou. It represented Cyprus in the Eurovision Song Contest 2012. The song was released in Europe on 3 February and in China on 14 April. The song was included in the euro edition of her debut studio album, San Ena Oniro (2011).

== Background ==
The song was written by Alex Papaconstantinou, Björn Djupström, Alexandra Zakka and Viktor Svensson for the Cypriot national selection for the Eurovision Song Contest 2012. The title of the song was revealed in early-December along with the titles of the other two songs. The song would be revealed on 9 January during a press conference of CyBC but was later announced that they would also be revealed three days earlier through the Facebook page of MTV. On 6 January, the song was revealed along with the promotional video clip.

== Critical reception ==
The song received mostly positive reviews from critics and was considered one of the favorites of the 2012 Eurovision. The song was named as a "halfway house between Jennifer Lopez's "On the Floor" and [...] dance hits by Inna and similar artists". Eurosongnation described it as an "upbeat entry and does appear quite refreshing" and said that despite the fact that the song has been a fan favorite, it won't be able to win. Writer of the Dramatic Reviews, during the live commentary of the final, described it as "cute little pop song, very catchy and very Eurovision" and also said that it samples a song of Lopez.

With an average of 7.13 out of 10, "La La Love" was positively received by the jury of Wiwibloggs. "Wiwi" gave the song 7.5 out of 10 and said that the lyrics are easy to remember and the melody gets stuck in your head and also said that the song could get a top 10 spot for the country. After giving it 8 out of 10, "Vebooboo" described it as upbeat with catchy tune and also said that the song could get as "Qélé, Qélé" and "Shady Lady" got a top 5 place. "Meows Kitty" gave the song the lowest score - 5 out of 10 - and said that "it's not a bad dance number but could do with some backup dancers with a more structured routine, as opposed to her dancing like a wild jungle woman on her own". Lastly, Deban gave the song 8 out of 10 and described it as "a song that upbeat, euro and bursting with a catchy chorus [...] a sound that's reminiscent of Stargate meets Guetta" and also called it as one of the freshest entries.

Critics of the EscFlashMalta gave the song an average of 7.33 out of 10. After giving it 7 out of 10, Jan described it as a cheap song with melody line and catchy words that could be a hit not only in Greece and Cyprus but possible in Europe too. Knut-Oyvind gave the song 6 out of 10 and said that "it feels a lot more sophisticated and the production has a more modern and individual sound". Lastly, Pitchtunes said that it is "a modern uptempo club song with potential, mediocre verses, with a even better bridge. The chorus has a catchy "lalala" b-part and contains a lot of energy" and gave it 6 out of 10.

== Eurovision ==
After Adamou was internally selected to represent Cyprus in the Eurovision Song Contest, there was a selection with three songs, all performed by Adamou, including "La La Love".

CyBC used an internal selection method to choose Ivi Adamou. Ivi and her recording company, Sony Music Greece, picked three songs to sing at the Cypriot national final, all of which are primarily written by foreign composers. At the national final, which took place on 25 January 2012, the winning song would be determined by 50% televoting and 50% jury vote.

In the end, "La La Love" was chosen to represent Cyprus in Eurovision Song Contest 2012. The song finished 7th in its semi-final and 16th in the grand final, Cyprus's best result since Lisa Andreas came 5th in the 2004 grand final with "Stronger Every Minute". Following the contest, "La La Love" also became one of only two Eurovision entries in the next week's UK top 100, selling 4,002 copies to chart at #77. (The other charting Eurovision entry was the winning entry "Euphoria", which charted at #3.)

The music video of the song is based on the story of Snow White.

No.	Song	Writers	Points	Place
1	"Call the Police"	Lene Dissing, Jakob Glæsner, Mikko Tamminen	18	2nd
2	"La La Love"	Alex Papaconstantinou, Björn Djupström, Alexandra Zakka, Viktor Svensson	24	1st
3	"You Don't Belong Here"	Niklas Jarl, Alexander Schöld, Sharon Vaughn	18	2nd

Ivi performed 12th in the first semi-final of the Eurovision Song Contest 2012, on 22 May 2012. She qualified to the final where she finished 16th, the best result of Cyprus since the 2004 contest with its entry by Lisa Andreas with "Stronger Every Minute".

== Formats and track listings ==
- CD Single
1. "La La Love" – 3:03
2. "La La Love (Instrumental Version)" - 3:03
- Digital download
1. "La La Love" – 3:02
- iTunes Remix EP
1. "La La Love" (Rico Bernasconi Remix Edit) - 2:56
2. "La La Love" (Rico Bernasconi Remix) - 5:07
3. "La La Love" (Arovia Remix Radio Edit) - 3:35
4. "La La Love" (Arovia Remix Club Version) - 5:29
5. "La La Love" (Duomo Remix) - 4:43

== Charts and certifications ==
=== Peak positions ===
Chart (2012)	Peak position
Austria (Ö3 Austria Top 40)	47
Belgium (Ultratip Bubbling Under Flanders)	11
Belgium (Ultratip Bubbling Under Wallonia)	34
Denmark (Tracklisten)	38
Finland (Suomen virallinen latauslista)	16
Germany (GfK)	43
Greece Digital Songs (Billboard)	2
Ireland (IRMA)	32
Norway (VG-lista)	16
Spain (Promusicae)	45
Sweden (Sverigetopplistan)	4
Swedish Airplay chart	1
Switzerland (Schweizer Hitparade)	66
Turkey (Turkish Singles Chart)	219
UK Singles (Official Charts)	77

=== Year-end charts ===
Chart (2012)	Position
Greek Airplay Chart	54
Sweden (Digilistan)	15
Sweden (Sverigetopplistan)	40

=== Certifications ===
Region	Certification	Certified units/sales
Sweden (GLF)	2× Platinum	80,000^{‡}
^{‡} Sales+streaming figures based on certification alone.

== Release history ==
Country	Date	Format	Label
Europe	3 February 2012	Digital download	Sony Music Greece
China	14 April 2013	Digital download	Sony Music Greece
