= San Erthi I Mera =

Single by Ivi Adamou feat. Stavento

from the album Mia Fora Kai Enan Kairo
- Released: 13 April 2010
- Recorded: 2010
- Genre: Pop, Hip Hop
- Label: Sony Music Greece

Ivi Adamou singles chronology
"Sose Me" (2010)	"San Erthi I Mera" (2010)	"To Mistiko Mou Na Vris" (2010)

Stavento singles chronology
"Ama S Iha Konta Mou" (2010)	"San Erthi I Mera" (2010)	"Ola Kala Tha Pane" (2011)

Music video
- "San Erthi I Mera" on YouTube

San Erthi I Mera (Greek: Σαν έρθει η μέρα) is a 2010 pop and hip hop song by the Greek-Cypriot singer Ivi Adamou with the Greek hip hop band Stavento. It was released on 13 April 2010 on MAD TV.

== Track listing ==
Digital download

1. "San Erthi I Mera" – 3:34

== Credits and personnel ==
- Lead vocals – Stavento and Ivi Adamou
- Producers – Meth
- Lyrics – Meth, Mageda
- Label: Sony Music Greece

== Music video ==
The music video was firstly uploaded on 13 April 2010. The video received more than one million views making it one of the most viewed Greek video clips. Later it was blocked worldwide by SME. Later in September it was re-uploaded in StaventoVEVO and the video currently has more than two million views.

== Awards ==
San Erthi I Mera was nominated for three awards at the 2011 MAD Video Music Awards and won one of them.

Year	Ceremony	Award	Result
2011	MAD Video Music Awards	Best Duet/Collaboration	Nominated
2011	MAD Video Music Awards	Best Video Clip of the Year	Nominated
2011	MAD Video Music Awards	Best Video Clip Hip Hop/Urban	Won

== Charts and certifications ==
=== Peak positions ===
Chart (2010)	Peak position
Greece Digital Songs (Billboard)	1

== Release history ==
Country	Date	Format	Label
Greece	13 April 2010	Digital download	Sony Music Greece
Cyprus	13 April 2010	Digital download	Sony Music Greece
