= Kalokairi Stin Kardia =

EP by Ivi Adamou
- Released: June 14, 2010
- Recorded: 2010
- Studio: Vox Studios, Athens, Greece; The Bunker, Stockholm, Sweden
- Genre: Pop
- Length: 34:04
- Label: Sony Music Greece/Day 1
- Producer: Giannis Doxas (executive), Torsten Abrolat, Leo "Freakchild" Chantzaras, Theodoros Darmas, Jason Gill, Alex Papaconstantinou, Dimitri Stassos, Fotios Stefos

Ivi Adamou chronology
Kalokairi Stin Kardia (2010)	Christmas with Ivi Adamou (2010)

Singles from Kalokairi Stin Kardia
- 1. "A*G*A*P*I (Crashing Down)" Released: March 2010; 2. "Sose Me (Lights On)" Released: April 2010; 3. "To Mistiko Mou Na Vris" Released: September 2010

Kalokairi Stin Kardia (Greek: Καλοκαίρι Στην Καρδιά; English: Summer in the heart) is the debut extended play by Greek Cypriot singer Ivi Adamou, released in Greece and Cyprus on 14 June 2010 by Sony Music Greece. On 5 November 2010, the second live show of the third season of the Greek The X Factor, where she was a contestant the year before, Adamou received a gold certification from the presenter, Sakis Rouvas, denoting shipments of six thousand copies.

== Release ==
"Sose Me (Lights On)" (Greek: Σώσε Με; English: Save Me) is the second single released to promote Kalokairi Stin Kardia. It was written by Lene Dissing, Hanif Sabzevari, Dimitris Stassos, Marcus Winther-John and Giannis Doxas, and on released April 26, 2010. Japanese singer Ayumi Hamasaki has sampled the song for her 2012 song Tell me why. The video music was published in Ivi's official channel in May 2010. The video was later blocked by SME and was published one year later, in May 2011 on Ivi's VEVO channel.

The third single, "To Mistiko Mou Na Vreis" (Greek: Το μυστικό μου να βρεις; English: Find my secret), was written by Adam Baptiste, Alex Papaconstantinou and Giannis Doxas. It was released on 10 June 2010.

A poll was held in August 2010 to find out which song would be Adamou's next single. The choice was between "Gelaei" and "To Mistiko Mou Na Vreis". It was announced on 30 August 2010 that the winner was "To Mistiko Mou Na Vreis". Filming of a video started in September 2010 and it was released on 15 November 2010. The video was uploaded on 15 November 2010 to IviAdamouTV. The video was blocked by SME worldwide and it was unblocked in 2011. It was announced that it would be uploaded again on VEVO channel but it never was.

== Track listing ==
No.	Title	Writer(s)	Producer(s)	Length
1.	"A*G*A*P*I" (Love)	Leo "Freakchild" Chantzaras, Keely Hawkes, Bruce Howell, Giannis Doxas (Greek lyrics)	Freakchild	3:02
2.	"Sose Me" (Save Me)	Lene Dissing, Hanif Sabzevari, Stassos, Marcus Winther-John, Doxas (Greek lyrics)	Jason Gill, Stassos (co.)	3:48
3.	"Gelaei" (Laughs)	Gill, Stassos, Mikaela Stenstrom, Doxas (Greek lyrics)	Gill, Stassos (co.)	4:01
4.	"To Mistiko Mou Na Vris" (Find my secret)	Adam Baptiste, Alex Papaconstantinou, Doxas (Greek lyrics)	Papaconstantinou	2:49
5.	"Hameni Agapi" (Lost love)	Mario Panas, Nikos Ellinaios	Thodoros Darmas	3:07
6.	"Kalokairi Stin Kardia" (feat. Sedat) (Summer in the heart)	Torsten Abrolat, Terry Bjerry, Fotios Stefos, Vagia Kalatzi	Stefos, Abrolat	3:43
7.	"Crashing Down"	Freakchild, Hawkes, Howell	Freakchild	3:02
8.	"A*G*A*P*I (Karaoke)" (Love)	Freakchild, Hawkes, Howell, Doxas (Greek lyrics)	Freakchild	3:02
9.	"Sose Me (Karaoke)" (Save Me)	Dissing, Sabzevari, Stassos, Winther-John, Doxas (Greek lyrics)	Gill, Stassos (co.)	3:48
10.	"Gelaei (Jus Jack club remix)" (Γελάει; Laughs)	Gill, Stassos, Stenstrom, Doxas (Greek lyrics)	Gill, Stassos (co.)	5:40

== Personnel ==
- Leo "Freakchild" Chantzaras – production, vocal recording, arrangement
- Jason Gill – vocal recording, production, arrangement, programming, mixing, guitar, keys
- Dimitris Stasos – vocal recording, production, guitar
- Alex Papaconstantinou – production, arrangement, programming, guitar, keys
- Theodoros Darmas – production, arrangement, vocal recording, programming, keys
- Fotios Stefos – vocal recording, production, arrangement
- Mikaela Stenstrom – background vocals
- Elena Patraklou – vocal coach, background vocals
- Thomas Lindberg – bass
- Erik Arvinder with friends – strings
- Adam Baptiste – background vocals
- Moh Denebi – mixing
- Aris Binis – vocal recording, mixing
- Bjorn Engelman – mastering
- Hendrik Eilers – mixing, mastering
- Spiros Kontakis – guitar
- Thomas Lindberg – bass
- Giannis Grigoriou – bass
- Alkis Misirlis – drums
- Antonis Glikos – artwork
- Charlie Makkos – photography
- Giannis Giannaridis (effex+) – grooming
- Giannis Trakas – styling
- Mirto Ganou – photo editing

== Certifications ==
Country	Certification
Greece	Gold
