= Melisses =

Greek band

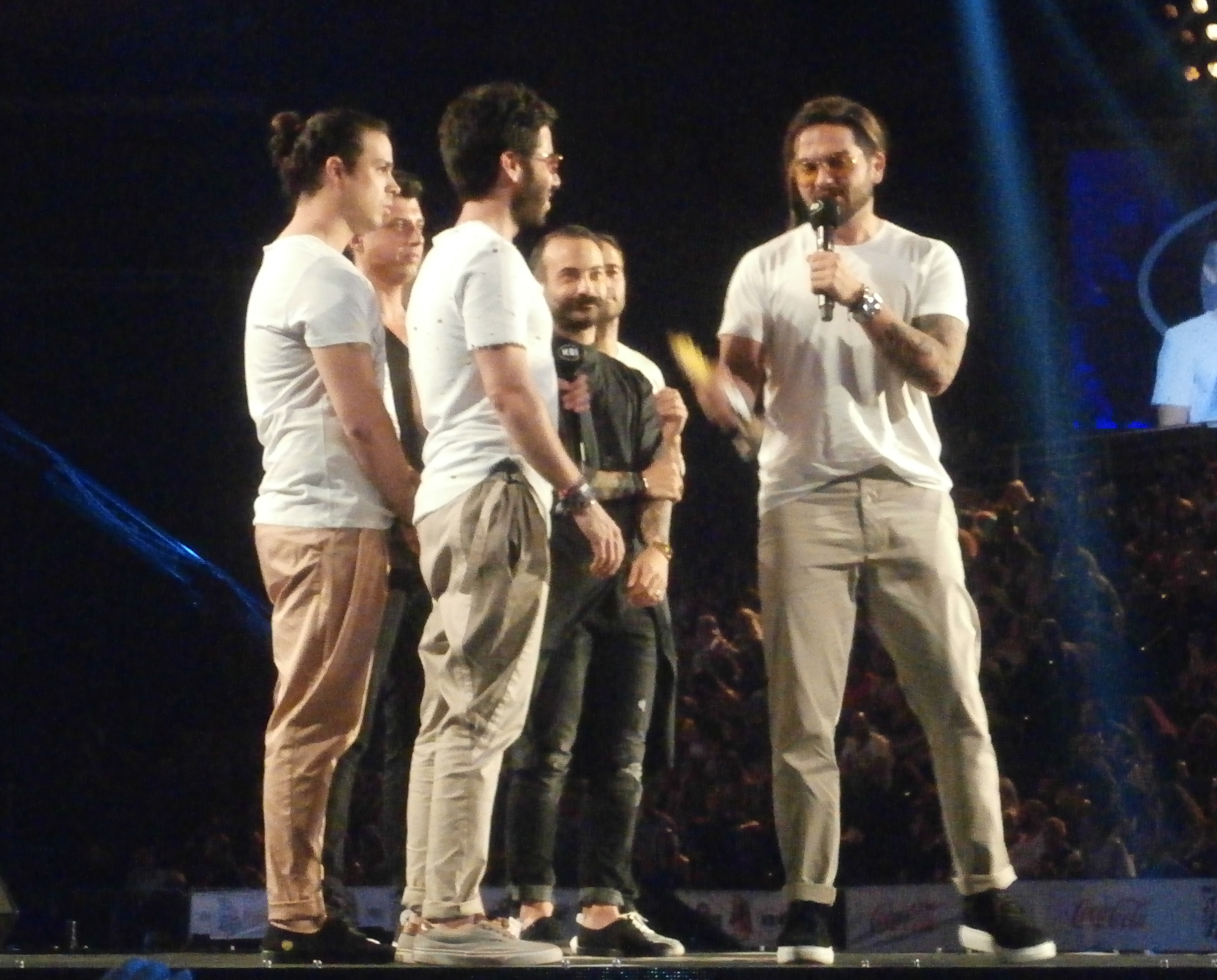
- Melissa and the 2017 Mad Video Music Awards

Background information
- Origin: Greece
- Years active: 2008–present
- Labels: Panik Records
- Members: Christos Mastoras (vocals); Costas Mavrogennis (bass); Thanos Laitsas (guitar)
- Website: https://melisses.band

Melisses (Greek; Μέλισσες, stylized as "ΜΕΛΙSSES") are a Greek band consisting of Christos Mastoras (vocals), Costas Mavrogennis (bass), and Thanos Laitsas (guitar). Since 2014, they have been signed to Panik Records.

Their career started in 2008. They have 16 diamond, platinum, and gold digital singles and one gold album. 12 of their songs have entered the top 10 of the radio chart and 5 of their singles have remained in no1 of airplay for more than 70 weeks. They have won 23 MAD VMA music awards, ten of which were for Best Band.

== History ==
The band was created in May 2008, with Christos Mastoras on vocals, Thanos Laitsas on guitar, Kostas Mavrogenis on bass, Pantelis Kyramargios on keyboards and Iakovos Sampsakis on drums. The current composition of the group emerged after the withdrawals of Iakovos Sampsakis (2015) and Pantelis Kyramargios (2017).

The name MELISSES (Greek for "bees") came from a random event. "We were all members of the group in Thiseio and we drank rakomela. At some point, a guy passes by and shouts "here are the best honeys, from the best bees!" "One of us stung the attack and threw the idea on the table to bring out the band Melisses", Christos Mastoras has said in an interview.

They made their debut with the song "Kryfa", which remained in the top 10 of Greek radio for 3 months, while in March 2010 they released their first album, entitled "Mystiko".

In 2010 they received the award for Best New Artist at the MAD VMA and were nominated for best Greek act at the European MTV.

== Discography ==
2010 Album "Mystiko"	Epikindina Filia Kryfa Mia Fora Pos Na S' Afiso O Kinezos Gia Psonia O Heimonas Perase Tha 'Rtho Konta Sou Stigmes I Mpalanta Ton Asterion Lonely Heart
2011 Album "Akou"	San Skia Akou Vrohi Oti Afines Miso Krata Ta Matia Sou Kleista ft. Ivi Adamou Paramythi Joanna Piki Piki O Kinezos 2 Lovers Fall More Than That
2012	Opos Ego - Goin' Through ft. Melisses
2013 Album "I Moni Epilogi"	Ena I Moni Epilogi Ola Moiazoun Kalokairi Osa Mou 'Hes Harisi Eleges I Won't Give Up ft. Courtney Parker An Vrethoume S' Ena Paramythi ft. Stan Se Thymamai Mazi Sou Hartina Karavia
2014	Kaigomai & Sigoliono, ft. Thanasis Vasilopoulos Oi Symmathites (OST of the movie Oi Symmathites)
2015	Oi Gamproi Tis Eftihias (OST of the movie Oi Gamproi Tis Eftihias) Ax Eftihia (OST of the movie Oi Gamproi Tis Eftihias) De Mporoume Na 'Maste Mazi The Honeymoon Song (from "The Βeatles Tribute Project", with Kamerata, at the Athens Concert Hall) De Me Noiazei Proti Mou Fora, duet with Demy
2016	Pio Dynata To Kyma
2017 Album "To Kyma"	To Kyma De Me Noiazei Pio Dynata De Mporoume Na \Maste Mazi Oi Symmathites Proti Mou Fora, duet with Demy De Me Noiazei (MAD version) Pio Dynata (Themis G. Mix) Dive ft. Playmen Bonus: Stand By Me Now - Playmen ft. Christos Mastoras
2017	Eimai Allou (single)
2018	To Kryfto Giati
2019	Den Eho Idea (Christos Mastoras) Ena Lepto (Christos Mastoras & Dimitris Mpasis) Let Me Be (Christos Mastoras & Rita Wilson) Let Me Be Remix Pack
2020	Misi Kardia Viktoria ft Dj Kas Let Me Be (Acoustic Version) Misi KardiaRemix Pack
2021 Album "ΜEΛΙSSES Duets"	Milo Gia Sena ft. Thanasis Vasilopoulos Saites ft. Toquel An Me Deis Na Klaio ft. Anastasios Rammos Ola S' Agapane ft. Stamatis Gonidis To Kyma ft. Babis Stokas Ola Teleiosan ft Tamta Emeis ft. Manto I Patrida Mou ft. Kaiti Garbi I Nihta Mirizi Giasemi ft. Themis Adamantidis Spasmeno Karavi ft. Dimitris Basis Den Eho Idea fr. Anastasios Rammos Xtes To Vrady St' Oneiro Mou ft. Stamatis Gonidis To Allo Mou Miso ft. Tamta Ena Letpo ft Dimitris Basis Stin Kardia ft. Themis Adamantidis Den Teleionei Etsi I Agapi ft. Tamta Ayto To Kalokairi ft. Manto Giati ft. Thanasis Vasilopoulos Poula Me ft. Anastasios Rammos Kaigomai Kai Sigoliono ft. Kompania Verdi To Mantili ft. Kompania Verdi Mia Agapi Den Teleionei ft. Stamatis Gonidis Stis Deropolis Ton Kampo ft. Kompania Verdi Ma Pou Na Pao ft. Themis Adamantidis
2021	Pou Nai I Agapi An (Christos Mastoras)
2022	Gia Mena Vradiase
2023	30 - 40 (Oh Yes I Do) Pes (Christos Mastoras & ZAF)
