= Michalis Kouinelis =

Greek rapper

Michalis Kouinelis Μιχάλης Κουϊνέλης
- Michalis Kouinelis at the Thessaloniki International Fair 2026

Background information
- Also known as: Methysos; Meth; Michalis Stavento
- Born: 22 March 1979 (age 47)
- Origin: Alexandroupoli, Greece
- Genres: Pop rap; R&B
- Occupations: Rapper; singer
- Years active: 1997–present

Michalis Kouinelis (Greek: Μιχάλης Κουϊνέλης; born March 22, 1979), also known as Stavento, Mike or METH is a Greek rapper, songwriter and the lead singer of the hip hop group Stavento.

== Career ==
His first discography work was with the group Babylon at the 1997 album, Arhi Epi Telous. His next works were also with the band on Kouarteto ton stihion and Epi telous. He has cooperated with the band Active Member on the album Meres Thavmasies, Paraxenes Meres. He was a partner of the Free Style Productions.

He always wanted to create something of his own that would be his "trademark", a child of his that would have his elements. Stavento was his "child," for which he handles production, writes the lyrics and performs.

In 2014, he became a coach in the reality show of ANT1, The Voice of Greece.

== Personal life ==
The media stated that he was in relationship with Ivi Adamou. Later, in one interview, Adamou denied the rumors. In 2014 though, Kouinelis revealed that they were in a relationship since 2013 and not since 2010 as the media claimed. They now live together in Alexandroupoli with their daughter.

== Discography ==
=== With Stavento ===
- To pio Glyko Methysi
- Grifos
- Simera to giortazo
- Mia fora ke enan kero
