= Stavento =

Greek hip-hop group

- Origin: Alexandroupoli, Greece
- Genres: Hip hop, R&B
- Years active: 2004-present
- Members: Michalis Kouinelis; Costas Lattas; Cleopatra
- Past members: Eva Kanata; Alexandra Koniak

Stavento is a Greek Hip-Hop band from Alexandroupoli. Created in 2004 by Michalis Kouinelis, Kostas Lattas (Akritas) and Eva Kanata. Responsible for the production and the lyrics appear to be Michalis Kouinellis, nicknamed "ICU". Quickly became known because it introduced new elements into Greek hip hop scene, Juggling several times between hip hop, R&B and rock. Great success with the songs "Beautiful" and "how long". Usually the single are collaborations with other artists outside of the band like "Before I meet" with Shaya and "As the day comes the" with Ivi Adamou.

== Discography ==
Michalis Kouinelis performing in 2026.

=== Albums ===
- To Pio Glyko Methysi (2004)
- Grifos (2006)
- Simera To Yortazo (2008)
- Mia Fora Ki Enan Kero (2010)
- Stin Akri Tou Kosmou (2013)
- Akoma Onireuomai (2016)

=== Singles ===
- To Pio Glyko Methysi
- Grifos
- Mesa Sou
- Prin Se Gnoriso feat. Shaya
- Simera To Giortazo
- Mesa sou feat. Helena Paparizou
- Mia Ginaika (Ola Ta Bori)
- San Erthi I Mera feat. Ivi Adamou
- Ama S'Iha Konta Mou
- Hey Hop
- Kano Ton Kosmo Anakato
- Ston Kosmo Mas
- Ola Kala Tha Pane
- Tha Ta Katafero
- Pidao Ta Kimata
- Astrapsa Kai Vrontiksa
- Na Sou Tragoudo feat. Ivi Adamou
- Aspro Pato feat Team STAVENTO(The voice of Greece 2015)
