= The X Factor (Greek TV series) series 3 =

The X Factor
- Series 3
- Hosted by: Sakis Rouvas (Live Shows); Giorgos Lianos (Audition Shows); Maria Sinatsaki (Audition Shows)
- Judges: George Levendis; Giorgos Theofanous; Katerina Gagaki; Nikos Mouratidis
- Winner: Haris Antoniou
- Runner-up: Alexandros Notas

Release
- Original network: ANT1
- Original release: 1 October 2010 – 11 February 2011

Series chronology
- ← Previous; Series 2 Next → Series 4

The X Factor is a Greek television reality music competition, based on the original series in the UK, to find new singing talent. The winner of which receives a recording contract with Sony Music Greece is Haris Antoniou. The third series began airing on ANT1 on 1 October 2010 and ended on 11 February 2011. The show was presented by Sakis Rouvas, with Giorgos Lianos and Maria Sinatsaki hosting the audition shows. The competition is split into several stages: auditions, bootcamp, judges' houses and live shows. Auditions took place throughout July and September 2010, with George Levendis, Giorgos Theofanous, Katerina Gagaki and Nikos Mouratidis returning as judges. Following bootcamp, successful acts were split into four categories: Boys (male soloists aged 16 to 24), Girls (female soloists aged 16 to 24), Over-25s (soloists aged 25 and over) and Groups. The live shows started on 29 October 2010. It is also broadcast abroad via ANT1's international stations.

== Selection process ==
=== Auditions ===
The first appeal for auditions occurred on June. The Auditions began in Nicosia on 23 July 2010 and concluded in New York City for the first time in the history of the Greek X Factor, on 12 September 2010.

==== Audition Venues ====
Audition city	Dates	Venue
Nicosia	24–25 July 2010	Hilton Park
Athens	18–20 August 2010	Studio Kappa
Thessaloniki	24–26 August 2010	Μet Hotel
New York City	10–12 September 2010	NEP Midtown Studios

=== Bootcamp ===
The "bootcamp" stage of the competition began on 20 September 2010 at the Goudi Olympic Complex, which is now the site of the ultra-modern Badminton Theater, hosting major theatrical productions and completed on 23 September 2010. This stage of the competition was aired on 22 October 2010. In this stage, the judges decided at each category the top 20 acts and finally the top 8 acts who qualified to the Judges' Houses. Katerina Gagaki will mentor Girls Under 24, George Levendis has the Boys Under 24, Nikos Mouratidis was given the 25s and Over and Giorgos Theofanous the Groups category.

=== Judges Houses ===
In the next round the judges reduced their 8 acts to locations around Greece. Nikos Mouratidis decided the 4 acts that will follow him to the live shows in Athens, Katerina Gagaki in Santorini, George Levendis in Ithaca and Giorgos Theofanous in Athens.This stage of the competition aired on 27 October 2010. After the judges, narrowed down the contestants to four each.

The sixteen eliminated acts were:

- Under 24 Boys – Giorgos Livanis, Aristotelis Ziberd, Platonas Tsipidis, Vikedios Kavalieratos
- Under 24 Girls – Eleni Plaxoura, Ifigenia Alkison, Kaliopi Papas, Mpela Mary
- 25 and Overs – Rania Tekou, Elpida Vitellas, Amy Rivard, Xristos
- Groups – Jocker, D7, Kapnos, Illusion

== Contestants and categories ==
The top 16 acts were confirmed as follows:

Key:

– Winner
– Runner-up
– Third Place

Category (mentor)	Acts			
Over 25s (Nikos Mouratidis)	Elena Anagiotou	Alexandros Notas	Grigoris Georgiou	Patrick Guibert
Girls 16-24 (Katerina Gagaki)	Nikki Ponte	Maria Katikaridou	Elena Georgiou	Kirki Katsarou
Boys 16-24 (George Levendis)	Alexis Zafeirakis	Dimitris Theodorakoglou	Haris Antoniou	Kostantinos Anastasiadis
Groups (Giorgos Theofanous)	The Burning Sticks	Revolt	T.U.	Tik Tok

=== Results summary ===
Colour key

–	Contestant was in the bottom two/three and had to sing again in the final showdown

Table showing weekly results, indicating which contestants were eliminated or safe, how each judge voted, and positions in each week's public vote where known.
	Week 1	Week 2	Week 3	Week 4	Week 5	Week 6	Week 7	Week 8	Week 9	Week 10	Week 11	Week 12	Week 13	Week 14	Week 15
Haris Antoniou	Safe	Safe	Safe	Safe	Safe	Safe	Safe	Safe	Safe	Safe	Safe	Safe	Bottom 2	Safe	Winner
Alexandros Notas	Safe	Safe	Safe	Safe	Safe	Safe	Safe	Safe	Safe	Safe	Safe	Safe	Safe	Safe	Runner-Up
Nikki Ponte	Safe	Safe	Safe	Safe	Safe	Safe	Safe	Safe	Safe	Safe	Safe	Safe	Safe	3rd	Third
T.U.	15th	Safe	Safe	Safe	Bottom 2	Safe	Bottom 2	Safe	Bottom 2	Safe	Bottom 2	Bottom 2	Bottom 2	Eliminated (week 13)	
Dimitris Theodorakoglou	Safe	Safe	Safe	Safe	Safe	Safe	Safe	8th	Safe	Bottom 2	Safe	Bottom 2	Eliminated (week 12)		
Grigoris Georgiou	Safe	Safe	Safe	Safe	Safe	Safe	Safe	Safe	Safe	Safe	Bottom 2	Eliminated (week 11)			
Konstantinos Anastasiadis	Safe	Safe	Safe	Safe	Safe	Safe	Safe	Safe	Safe	Bottom 2	Eliminated (week 10)				
Elena Anagiotou	Safe	Safe	Safe	Safe	Safe	Safe	Safe	Safe	Bottom 2	Eliminated (week 9)					
Maria Katikaridou	Safe	Safe	Safe	Safe	Safe	Bottom 2	Safe	9th	Eliminated (week 8)						
The Burning Sticks	Safe	Safe	Bottom 2	Safe	Safe	Safe	Bottom 2	Eliminated (week 7)							
Patrick Guibert	Safe	Bottom 2	Safe	Safe	Safe	Bottom 2	Eliminated (week 6)								
Revolt	Safe	Safe	Safe	Bottom 2	Bottom 2	Eliminated (week 5)									
Kirki Katsarou	Safe	Safe	Safe	Bottom 2	Eliminated (week 4)										
Alexis Zafeirakis	Safe	Safe	Bottom 2	Eliminated (week 3)											
Tik Tok	Safe	Bottom 2	Eliminated (week 2)												
Elena Georgiou	16th	Eliminated (week 1)													
Final showdown	Elena Georgiou, T.U.	Patrick Guibert, Tik Tok	Alexis Zafeirakis, The Burning Sticks	Kirki Katsarou, Revolt	Revolt, T.U.	Maria Katikardiou, Patrick Guibert	The Burning Sticks, T.U.	Maria Katikardiou, Dimitris Theodorakoglou	Elena Anagiotou, T.U.	Konstantinos Anastasiadis, Dimitris Theodorakoglou	Grigoris Georgiou, T.U.	Dimitris Theodorakoglou, T.U.	Harris Antoniou, T.U.	No final showdown or judges' vote: results are based on public votes alone	
Mouratidis's vote to eliminate	T.U.	Tik Tok	Alexis Zafeirakis	Kirki Katsarou	Revolt	Maria Katikardiou	The Burning Sticks	Dimitris Theodorakoglou	T.U.	Konstantinos Anastasiadis	T.U.	Dimitris Theodorakoglou	T.U.	No final showdown or judges' vote: results are based on public votes alone	
Gagaki's vote to eliminate	T.U.	Tik Tok	Alexis Zafeirakis	Revolt	Revolt	Patrick Guibert	T.U.	Dimitris Theodorakoglou	Elena Anagiotou	Konstantinos Anastasiadis	Grigoris Georgiou	Dimitris Theodorakoglou	T.U.	No final showdown or judges' vote: results are based on public votes alone	
Levendis's vote to eliminate	Elena Georgiou	Tik Tok	The Burning Sticks	Kirki Katsarou	Revolt	Patrick Guibert	The Burning Sticks	Maria Katikardiou	Elena Anagiotou	Konstantinos Anastasiadis(x2)	Grigoris Georgiou	T.U.	T.U.	No final showdown or judges' vote: results are based on public votes alone	
Theofanous's vote to eliminate	Elena Gerogiou	Patrick Guibert	Alexis Zafeirakis	Kirki Katsarou	N/A	Patrick Guibert	The Burning Sticks (x2)	Maria Katikardiou	Elena Anagiotou	Dimitris Theodorakoglou	Grigoris Georgiou	Dimitris Theodorakoglou	Harris Antoniou	No final showdown or judges' vote: results are based on public votes alone	
Eliminated	Elena Georgiou; 2 of 4 votes Deadlock	Tik Tok; 3 of 4 votes Majority	Alexis Zafeirakis; 3 of 4 votes Majority	Kirki Katsarou; 3 of 4 votes Majority	Revolt; 3 of 3 votes Majority	Patrick Guibert; 3 of 4 votes Majority	The Burning Sticks; 4 of 5 votes Majority	Maria Katikardiou; 2 of 4 votes Deadlock	Elena Anagiotou; 3 of 4 votes Majority	Konstantinos Anastasiadis; 4 of 5 votes	Grigoris Georgiou; 3 of 4 votes	Dimitris Theodorakoglou; 3 of 4 votes	T.U. 3 of 4 votes	Niki Ponte; Third Place	Alexandros Notas; Runner-Up
Eliminated	Elena Georgiou; 2 of 4 votes Deadlock	Tik Tok; 3 of 4 votes Majority	Alexis Zafeirakis; 3 of 4 votes Majority	Kirki Katsarou; 3 of 4 votes Majority	Revolt; 3 of 3 votes Majority	Patrick Guibert; 3 of 4 votes Majority	The Burning Sticks; 4 of 5 votes Majority	Maria Katikardiou; 2 of 4 votes Deadlock	Elena Anagiotou; 3 of 4 votes Majority	Konstantinos Anastasiadis; 4 of 5 votes	Grigoris Georgiou; 3 of 4 votes	Dimitris Theodorakoglou; 3 of 4 votes	T.U. 3 of 4 votes	Niki Ponte; Third Place	Harris Antoniou; Winner

== Live shows ==
The live shows began on 29 October 2009, with contestants performing on the Friday night shows and the results being announced later on the same day, and continued through to the finale on 11 February 2011. Like the previous series, the televoters had the chance to vote from the beginning of the show.

=== Week 1 (29 October 2010) ===
- Theme: Mentor's choice and Sakis Rouvas songs
- Celebrity performers: Pauline Kamusewu "Never Said I Was A Angel", "Give Me A Call" / Sakis Rouvas "Parafora"
- Group performance: Fysika Mazi – Together Forever, Gettin' Over

Contestants' performances on the first live show
Act	Order	Song	Result
Alexis Zafeirakis	1	"Getting Away with It (All Messed Up)"	Safe
Nikki Ponte	2	"Teenage Dream"	Safe
Grigoris Georgiou	3	"Se Thelo San Trelos"	Safe
Tik Tok	4	"Tik Tok"	Safe
Kostantinos Anastasiadis	5	"To Kalokairi Mou"	Safe
Maria Katikaridou	6	"Den Ehi Sidera I Kardia Sou"	Safe
The Burning Sticks	7	"Earth Song"	Safe
Patrick Guibert	8	"Sympathique"	Safe
Dimitris Theodorakoglou	9	"Are You Gonna Be My Girl"	Safe
T.U	10	"Andexa"	Bottom two
Alexandros Notas	11	"Prigipessa"	Safe
Kirki Katsarou	12	"Ayo Technology"	Safe
Haris Antoniou	13	"S'eho Erotefthi"	Safe
Revolt	14	"Kryfa"	Safe
Elena Georgiou	15	"Oti Axizei"	Bottom two
Elena Anagiotou	16	"Aperanto Keno"	Safe
Final showdown details
T.U	1	N/A	Safe
Elena Georgiou	2	N/A	Eliminated

Judges' votes to eliminate

- Giorgos Theofanous: Elena Georgiou
- Katerina Gagaki: T.U
- George Levendis: Elena Georgiou
- Nikos Mouratidis: T.U

The result went to deadlock, and Elena Georgiou was eliminated from the competition.

=== Week 2 (5 November 2010) ===
- Theme: Mentor's choice
- Celebrity performers: Ivi Adamou "Το Mistiko Mou Na Vreis (I Can't Help It)" / 48 Ores "Ignorant With Guns"

Contestants' performances on the second live show
Act	Order	Song	Result
Dimitris Theodorakoglou	1	"To the Moon and Back"	Safe
Maria Katikaridou	2	"It's a Man's Man's Man's World"	Safe
T.U	3	"Song 2"	Safe
Patrick Guibert	4	"Wonderwall"	Bottom two
Haris Antoniou	5	"(Everything I Do) I Do It for You"	Safe
Nikki Ponte	6	"Mamma Mia"	Safe
The Burning Sticks	7	"Seven Nation Army"	Safe
Elena Anagiotou	8	"To Maxairi"	Safe
Alexis Zafeirakis	9	"Personal Jesus"	Safe
Tik Tok	10	"Hung Up"/"Gimme! Gimme! Gimme! (A Man After Midnight)"	Bottom two
Kostantinos Anastasiadis	11	"Wonderful Life"	Safe
Kirki Katsarou	12	"Last Kiss"	Safe
Alexandros Notas	13	"Feugo Gia Mena"	Safe
Revolt	14	"Every You Every Me"	Safe
Grigoris Georgiou	15	"Taxidevo To Ego Mou"	Safe
Final showdown details
Tik Tok	1	N/A	Eliminated
Patrick Guibert	2	N/A	Safe

Judges' votes to eliminate

- Giorgos Theofanous: Patrick Guibert
- Katerina Gagaki: Tik Tok
- George Levendis: Tik Tok
- Nikos Mouratidis: Tik Tok

=== Week 3 (12 November 2010) ===
- Theme: Mentor's choice
- Celebrity performers: Nikiforos "Iposhesou", "Se Ena Fili Sou" / RENT "Agapi"

Contestants' performances on the third live show
Act	Order	Song	Result
The Burning Sticks	1	"Take My Breath Away"	Bottom two
Grigoris Georgiou	2	"Theos"	Safe
Alexis Zafeirakis	3	"Den Eimai Allos"	Bottom two
Maria Katikaridou	4	"An Isouna Agapi"	Safe
T.U	5	"Feel"	Safe
Haris Antoniou	6	"Into the Night"	Safe
Patrick Guibert	7	"Etsi Eimai Ego"	Safe
Revolt	8	"I Like the Way (You Move)"/"Klepsidra"	Safe
Nikki Ponte	9	"You Lost Me"	Safe
Dimitris Theodorakoglou	10	"Numb"	Safe
Alexandros Notas	11	"Logia Filika"	Safe
Kirki Katsarou	12	"Loca"	Safe
Elena Anagiotou	13	"Oneiro Itane"	Safe
Kostantinos Anastasiadis	14	"Spasmeno Karavi"	Safe
Final showdown details
The Burning Sticks	1	N/A	Safe
Alexis Zafeirakis	2	N/A	Eliminated

Judges' votes to eliminate

- Giorgos Theofanous: Alexis Zafeirakis
- Katerina Gagaki: Alexis Zafeirakis
- George Levendis: The Burning Sticks
- Nikos Mouratidis: Alexis Zafeirakis

=== Week 4 (19 November 2010) ===
- Theme: Mentor's choice
- Celebrity performers: Kokkina Xalia "Emeis", "Se Thelw Apopse"

Contestants' performances on the fourth live show
Act	Order	Song	Result
Elena Anagiotou	1	"Kathreftizo To Nou"	Safe
T.U	2	"Alors on danse"	Safe
Haris Antoniou	3	"More Than Words"	Safe
Grigoris Georgiou	4	"Smooth"	Safe
Nikki Ponte	5	"Take It Off"	Safe
Maria Katikaridou	6	"Bad Romance"	Safe
Alexandros Notas	7	"Mia Nihta Zoriki"	Safe
Revolt	8	"Kryptonite"	Bottom two
Patrick Guibert	9	"Kissing a Fool"	Safe
Dimitris Theodorakoglou	10	"Vertigo"	Safe
Kirki Katsarou	11	"Satellite"	Bottom two
Kostantinos Anastasiadis	12	"Emena Thes"	Safe
The Burning Sticks	13	"Crazy in Love"	Safe
Final showdown details
Revolt	1	N/A	Safe
Kirki Katsarou	2	N/A	Eliminated

Judges' votes to eliminate

- Giorgos Theofanous: Kirki Katsarou
- Katerina Gagaki: Revolt
- George Levendis: Kirki Katsarou
- Nikos Mouratidis: Kirki Katsarou

=== Week 5 (26 November 2010) ===
- Theme: Mentor's choice
- Celebrity performers: Stavros Michalakakos "Na Me Katastrepseis Glika", "Vres To Nisi (Find the island)" / Mironas Stratis "I Skotini Mou Plevra", "Prin Mas Dei Kaneis"

Contestants' performances on the fifth live show
Act	Order	Song (original artists)	Result
Elena Anagiotou	1	"Eisai Esi O Athropos Mou"	Safe
Kostantinos Anastasiadis	2	"Soma me Soma"	Safe
Revolt	3	"Lonely Day"	Bottom two
Grigoris Georgiou	4	"Agapi"	Safe
Maria Katikaridou	5	"The Unforgiven"	Safe
The Burning Sticks	6	"Black Magic Woman"	Safe
Haris Antoniou	7	"Rikse Kokkino Stin Nihta"	Safe
T.U	8	"Omen"	Bottom two
Nikki Ponte	9	"I (Who Have Nothing)"	Safe
Dimitris Theodorakoglou	10	"O Imnos Ton Mavron Skilion"	Safe
Patrick Guibert	11	"La Vie en rose"	Safe
Alexandros Notas	12	"Anthropoi Monahoi"	Safe
Final showdown details
T.U	1	N/A	Safe
Revolt	2	N/A	Eliminated

Judges' votes to eliminate

- Giorgos Theofanous: N/A
- Katerina Gagaki: Revolt
- George Levendis: Revolt
- Nikos Mouratidis: Revolt

=== Week 6 (3 December 2010) ===
- Theme: Mentor's choice
- Celebrity performers:

Contestants' performances on the sixth live show
Act	Order	Song	Result
Haris Antoniou	1	"Too Funky"	Safe
T.U	2	"Hero"	Safe
Alexandros Notas	3	"Mono Mia Fora"	Safe
Maria Katikaridou	4	"Maria Maria"	Bottom two
Dimitris Theodorakoglou	5	"Come Together"	Safe
Elena Anagiotou	6	"Eklaige Mazi Mou To Feggari"	Safe
Kostantinos Anastasiadis	7	"Oti Agapo Einai Diko Sou"	Safe
Grigoris Georgiou	8	"Paei I Agapi Mou"	Safe
Nikki Ponte	9	"Children of Piraeus (The)"	Safe
The Burning Sticks	10	"Valerie"	Safe
Patrick Guibert	11	"Don't Stop the Music"	Bottom two
Final showdown details
Patrick Guibert	1	N/A	Eliminated
Maria Katikardiou	2	N/A	Safe

Judges' votes to eliminate

- Giorgos Theofanous: Patrick Guibert
- Katerina Gagaki: Patrick Guibert
- George Levendis: Patrick Guibert
- Nikos Mouratidis: Maria Katikardiou

=== Week 7 (10 December 2010) ===
- Theme: Mentor's choice
- Celebrity performers: Mark Angelo ft. Shaya "Far From Everything", "In Your Eyes" / Vegas "Mi Se Noiazei", "Mad About You"

Contestants' performances on the seventh live show
Act	Order	Song	Result
T.U	1	"Killing in the Name"	Bottom two
The Burning Sticks	2	"Whole Lotta Love"	Bottom two
Alexandros Notas	3	"Ragizei Apopse"	Safe
Haris Antoniou	4	"Corazón espinado"	Safe
Maria Katikaridou	5	"Total Eclipse of the Heart"	Safe
Kostantinos Anastasiadis	6	"koita Ti Ekanes"	Safe
Nikki Ponte	7	"Like a Prayer"	Safe
Elena Anagiotou	8	"These Boots Are Made for Walkin'"	Safe
Grigoris Georgiou	9	"I Skoni"	Safe
Dimitris Theodorakoglou	10	"Livin' on a Prayer"	Safe
Final showdown details
T.U	1	N/A	Safe
The Burning Sticks	2	N/A	Eliminated

Judges' votes to eliminate

- Giorgos Theofanous: The Burning Sticks
- Katerina Gagaki: T.U
- George Levendis: The Burning Sticks
- Nikos Mouratidis: The Burning Sticks

=== Week 8 (24 December 2010) ===
- Theme: Mentor's choice
- Celebrity performers: Onirama "Epanastatis", "Oneiropagida", "O, ti Den Exeis", "Ftwxos", "Ekei Gia Sena Egw"

Contestants' performances on the eighth live show
Act	Order	Song	Result
Maria Katikaridou	1	"Tha 'Mai Allios"	Bottom two
Dimitris Theodorakoglou	2	"Paradise City"	Bottom two
Elena Anagiotou	3	"Ta Kormia Kai Ta Maheria"	Safe
Haris Antoniou	4	"Sinaylia"	Safe
Nikki Ponte	5	"Monday Morning"	Safe
Alexandros Notas	6	"Oi Eleytheroi ki Wraioi"	Safe
Kostantinos Anastasiadis	7	"Xoris Anapnoh"	Safe
Grigoris Georgiou	8	"Zhleyei H Nyxta"	Safe
T.U	9	"Diskolos Kairos Gia Prinkipes"	Safe
Final showdown details
Dimitris Theodorakoglou	1	"Wanted Dead or Alive"	Safe
Maria Katikaridou	2	"All the Man That I Need"	Eliminated

Judges' votes to eliminate

- Giorgos Theofanous: Maria Katikaridou
- Katerina Gagaki: Dimitris Theodorakoglou
- George Levendis: Maria Katikaridou
- Nikos Mouratidis: Dimitris Theodorakoglou

The result went to deadlock, and Maria Katikaridou and was eliminated from the competition.

=== Week 9 (31 December 2010) ===
- Theme: Mentor's choice
- Celebrity performers: BO featuring Kristina S "Kane Me Na Trelathw" / Matyas "Missing You" / Antonis Remos "Terma I Istoria", "Kommena Pia Ta Daneika", "Einai Stigmes"
- Group performance: "The Time (Dirty Bit)", "Written in the Stars", "I Like It", "Firework", "Rotisa", "Ta Isia Anapoda", "Parafora"

Contestants' performances on the ninth live show
Act	Order	Song	Result
Grigoris Georgiou	1	"San Na Min Perase Mia Mera"	Safe
Kostantinos Anastasiadis	2	"Xamogelase"	Safe
Alexandros Notas	3	"Svise To Feggari"	Safe
Haris Antoniou	4	"Superstition"	Safe
Nikki Ponte	5	"Respect"	Safe
T.U	6	"Bohemian Like You"	Bottom two
Elena Anagiotou	7	"Exartatai"	Bottom two
Dimitris Theodorakoglou	8	"Love Is Gone"	Safe
Final showdown details
Elena Anagiotou	1	"An Den M'Agapas"	Eliminated
T.U	2	"Written in the Stars"	Safe

Judges' votes to eliminate

- Giorgos Theofanous: Elena Anagiotou
- Katerina Gagaki: Elena Anagiotou
- George Levendis: Elena Anagiotou
- Nikos Mouratidis: T.U

=== Week 10 (7 January 2011) ===
- Themes: Mentor's choice and Contestant's choice
- Celebrity performers: Pale Faces "Ola Petane" / Goin' Through featuring Professional Sinnerz and Nevma "Den Katalabainw", "To Psema Plhrwnei", "Mporw Kai Egw"

Contestants' performances on the tenth live show
Act	Order	First song (Mentor's choice)	Order	Second song (Contestant's choice)	Result
Kostantinos Anastasiadis	1	"Mi Svineis Ta Fota"	14	"O Bythos Sou"	Bottom two
Alexandros Notas	2	"Parallila"	11	"Liomeno Pagoto"	Safe
T.U	3	"Love the Way You Lie"	8	"Airplanes"	Safe
Dimitris Theodorakoglou	4	"Dani California"	10	"To Xrono Stamataw"	Bottom two
Nikki Ponte	5	"Only Girl (In the World)"	9	"Empire State of Mind (Part II) Broken Down"	Safe
Haris Antoniou	6	"This Love"	12	"Beautiful Day"	Safe
Grigoris Georgiou	7	"Asimenia Sfika"	13	"The Blower's Daughter"	Safe
Final showdown details
Kostantinos Anastasiadis	1	"Emeina Edw"			Eliminated
Dimitris Theodorakoglou	2	"Feel"			Safe

Judges' votes to eliminate

- Giorgos Theofanous: Dimitris Theodorakoglou
- Katerina Gagaki: Kostantinos Anastasiadis
- George Levendis: Kostantinos Anastasiadis
- Nikos Mouratidis: Kostantinos Anastasiadis

=== Week 11 (14 January 2011) ===
- Themes: Songs from Films or Musicals and Contestant's choice
- Celebrity performers: Nikos Ganos "Last Summer", "Koita Ti Ekanes" "Poso Akoma" / Tamta "O'ti Eixa Oneireytei", "Egoista", "Fotia"
- Group performance: "Welcome to Burlesque", "But I Am a Good Girl", "Express", "Something's Got a Hold on Me" (from the film Burlesque)

Contestants' performances on the eleventh live show
Act	Order	First song	Film or Musical	Order	Second song (Contestant's choice)	Result
Grigoris Georgiou	1	"El Tango de Roxanne"	Moulin Rouge!	7	"Gia To Kalo Mou"	Bottom two
Haris Antoniou	2	"She"	Notting Hill	9	"Just the Way You Are"	Safe
T.U	3	"Stayin' Alive"	Saturday Night Fever	8	"Apologize"	Bottom two
Alexandros Notas	4	"Ola Dika Sou"	N/A	11	"Pou Na 'Sai"	Safe
Nikki Ponte	5	"All That Jazz"	Chicago	10	"Telephone"	Safe
Dimitris Theodorakoglou	6	"Great Balls of Fire"	Great Balls of Fire!	12	"Tha Parw Fwra"	Safe
Final showdown details
Grigoris Georgiou	1	"Thalassa Platia"				Eliminated
T.U	2	"Sweet Home Alabama"				Safe

Judges' votes to eliminate

- Giorgos Theofanous: Grigoris Georgiou
- Katerina Gagaki: Grigoris Georgiou
- George Levendis: Grigoris Georgiou
- Nikos Mouratidis: T.U

=== Week 12 (21 January 2011) ===
- Themes: Best of 90s and Contestant's choice
- Celebrity performers: Eleni Alexandri "Dance With You" / Nini Shermadini "S'agapao Akoma (Mi Sei Venuto A Cercare Tu)" / Mellises "Kryfa", "O kinezos", "Epikindina Filia", "Lonely Heart"
- Group performance: "Ice Ice Baby", "What Is Love", "All That She Wants", "Something Got Me Started", "U Can't Touch This", "Tubthumping"

Contestants' performances on the twelfth live show
Act	Order	First song (90's)	Order	Second song (Contestant's choice)	Result
Dimitris Theodorakoglou	1	"Gangsta's Paradise"	6	"Highway to Hell"	Bottom two
T.U	2	"The Show Must Go On"	7	"Whataya Want from Me"	Bottom two
Alexandros Notas	3	"Epimenw"	8	"Poios Na Sygkrithei Mazi Sou"	Safe
Haris Antoniou	4	"Losing My Religion"	9	"What About Now"	Safe
Nikki Ponte	5	"When You Tell Me That You Love Me"	10	"Oops!... I Did It Again"	Safe
Final showdown details
Dimitris Theodorakoglou	1	"I Don't Want to Be"			Eliminated
T.U	2	"Where Is the Love?"			Safe

Judges' votes to eliminate

- Giorgos Theofanous: Dimitris Theodorakoglou
- Katerina Gagaki: Dimitris Theodorakoglou
- George Levendis: T.U
- Nikos Mouratidis: Dimitris Theodorakoglou

=== Week 13 (28 January 2011) ===
- Themes: Mentor's choice and Contestant's choice
- Celebrity performers: Amaryllis "Ayto Einai O Erwtas" / C:Real ft. Katerina Papoutsaki "To Allo Mou Miso" / OtherView "Kane Me", "Hit the Road Jack(Dirty Mix)"
- Group performance: "Fsss Bpoing Touist", "O Mathitis", "To Feggari Panwthe Mou", "Crazy Girl", "H Agapi Thelei Dyo", "Menoume Panta Paidia"

Contestants' performances on the 13 live show
Act	Order	First song (Mentor's choice)	Order	Second song (Contestant's choice)	Result
T.U	1	"Pump It"	5	"What Goes Around.../...Comes Around"	Bottom two
Alexandros Notas	2	"Aporw"	6	"Ena Gramma"	Safe
Haris Antoniou	3	"Faith"	7	"All Along the Watchtower"	Bottom two
Nikki Ponte	4	"Woman in Love"	8	"Kommati Ap' Tin Kardia Sou"	Safe
Final showdown details
Haris Antoniou	1	"Billie Jean"			Safe
T.U	2	"H Kybwtos"			Eliminated

Judges' votes to eliminate

- Giorgos Theofanous: Haris Antoniou
- Katerina Gagaki: T.U
- George Levendis: T.U
- Nikos Mouratidis: T.U

=== Week 14 (4 February 2011) ===
- Themes: Mentor's choice and Contestant's choice
- Group performance: "Ipirhes Panda", "Synora", "S'agapw"
- Celebrity performers: Sakis Rouvas "Nekros Okeanos", "I Dio Mas", "Gia Mas"

Contestants' performances on the 14 live show
Act	Order	First song (Mentor's choice)	Order	Second song (Contestant's choice)	Result
Alexandros Notas	1	"Eho Esena"	6	"Mikrh Patrida"	Safe
Haris Antoniou	2	"Sorry Seems to Be the Hardest Word"	4	"Einai Stigmes"	Safe
Nikki Ponte	3	"Bad"	5	"Hurt"	Eliminated

=== Week 15 (11 February 2011) ===
- Themes: Mentor's choice and Contestant's choice
- Group performances: "Gia na s'ekdikitho", "Simera – Tonight"
- Celebrity performers: Elena Paparizou "An Isouna Agapi", "Baby It's Over", "Girna Me Sto Htes", "Psahno Tin Alitheia"

Contestants' performances on the final live show
Act	Order	First song	Order	Second song	Result
Alexandros Notas	1	" Mia Kokkini Grammi "	3	"Pote ksana (Con te partirò)"	Runner Up
Haris Antoniou	2	"You Are So Beautiful"	4	"Ekeini"	Winner
