= Haris Antoniou =

Greek Cypriot singer and musician

Harry Antoniou Χάρης Αντωνίου
- Born: 9 March 1989 (age 36); New York, United States
- Origin: Limassol, Cyprus
- Genres: Pop
- Years active: 2010–present
- Labels: Sony Music Greece

Harry Antoniou (Greek: Χάρης Αντωνίου; born 9 March 1989) is a Greek Cypriot singer and musician. On 11 February 2011 he won the third season of the Greek version of the television singing competition The X Factor after singing Joe Cocker’s "You Are So Beautiful". He was awarded a two-year contract with Sony Music Greece.

Harry Antoniou (at times Charis "Haris" Antoniou) is the third Cypriot to have won the Greek competition, after Loukas Giorkas won in the first season and Stavros Michalakakos in the second season. He started saxophone lessons and at the age of 15, came third in the Pancyprian saxophone competition. Working in his teens as a singer and saxophonist, he was able to attract more and more people creating its own fan club from a young age before applying to the Greek X-Factor.

He released his first digital single titled "Στον Κόσμο Μου Εγώ" with lyrics by Nikos Moraitis while preparing his debut album.

He married Lauren Meyer in the summer of 2019.

== Discography ==
=== Singles ===
- 2011: "Ston kozmo mou ego" (in Greek "Στον Κόσμο Μου Εγώ")

Preceded by Stavros Michalakakos	The X Factor (Greece); Winner; 2011	Succeeded by Incumbent
