= A*G*A*P*I (Crashing Down) =

Single by Ivi Adamou

from the album Kalokairi Stin Kardia
- Released: 25 January 2010
- Genre: Pop
- Length: 3:12
- Label: Sony Music Greece/Day 1
- Songwriter(s): Leo Chantzaras, Keely Hawkes, Bruce Howell, Giannis Doxas

Ivi Adamou singles chronology
"A*G*A*P*I (Crashing Down)" (2010)	"Sose Me" (2010)

Music video
- "AGAPI" on YouTube

"A*G*A*P*I (Crashing Down)" (Greek: Α*Γ*Α*Π*Η; English: L-O-V-E) is the debut single by the Greek Cypriot singer Ivi Adamou from her first album Kalokairi Stin Kardia, written by Leo Chantzaras, Keely Hawkes, Bruce Howell and Giannis Doxas. It was released on January 25, 2010.

== Background and release ==
After her elimination from The X Factor, she signed a contract with Sony Music Greece and released her first single a few days later. On 25 January 2010, the single was released. Adamou first performed the song in Aksizei na to deis, a program in ANT1.

== Track listing ==
Digital download

1. "A*G*A*P*I (Crashing Down)" – 3:44
2. "A*G*A*P*I (Crashing Down)" (Karaoke version) – 3:44
3. "Crashing Down" – 3:44

== Credits and personnel ==
- Lead vocals – Ivi Adamou
- Producers – Leo Chantzaras
- Lyrics – Leo Chantzaras, Keely Hawkes, Bruce Howell, Giannis Doxas
- Label: Sony Music Greece/Day 1

== Music video ==
The video music was published in Ivi's official channel in February 2010. The video was later blocked by SME and was published in November 2011 on Ivi's VEVO channel. It was the first video in the channel.

== Charts and certifications ==
=== Peak positions ===
Chart (2010)	Peak position
Greece Digital Songs (Billboard)	10

== Release history ==
Country	Date	Format	Label
Greece	January 29, 2010	Digital download	Sony Music Greece
Cyprus	January 29, 2010	Digital download	Sony Music Greece
