= The X Factor (Greek TV series) series 4 =

The X Factor
- Series 4
- Hosted by: Sakis Rouvas (Live Shows); Evagelia Aravani (Auditions Shows, Bootcamp, Chair Challenge, Backstage - Live Shows)
- Judges: George Theofanous; Peggy Zina; Tamta; Thodoris Marantinis
- Winner: Andreas Leontas
- Runner-up: Ian Stratis

Release
- Original network: Skai TV
- Original release: 4 April – 8 July 2016

Series chronology
- ← Previous; Series 3 Next → Series 5

The fourth series of the Greek music talent show The X Factor began airing on Skai TV on 4 April 2016, The show was presented for a second year by Sakis Rouvas. It was also broadcast abroad via SKAI's international stations.

== Selection process ==
Public auditions by aspiring pop singers began in February 2016 and were held in two cities; Athens and Thessaloniki. All four series 4 judges, Thodoris Marantinis, George Theofanous, Tamta, Peggy Zina returned to judge the contestants. Following initial auditions, in February 2016, around 200 acts attended the boot camp. The contestants were initially split into groups of three, and judges gave instant decisions on who would leave based on the group performances, bringing the number of acts down to 150. The judges then cut the number of acts down to 80. These were split into four categories: Boys, Girls, Over 25s and Groups, before the judges discovered which category they would mentor for the rest of the competition. In series 2, the Boys (16–24) are being mentored by George Theofanous, Tamta has the Girls (16–24), Peggy Zina mentors the Over 25s, and Thodoris Marantinis takes charge of the Groups. At the last stage of boot camp, the 80 acts were reduced to 32. After an emotional "Four Chair Challenge", the 32 acts were reduced to 16, who went on to the live finals, with one act being eliminated each week by a combination of public vote and judges' decision until a winner was found. There was an exception for the first live show, where four acts, one from each category, were eliminated.

== Contestants and categories ==
The top 16 acts were confirmed as follows:

Key;

– Winner
– Runner-up
– Third Place

Category (mentor)	Acts			
Girls 16-24 (Tamta)	Christiana Mpounia	Christina Zanti	Tania Breazou	Eleni Koskina
Boys 16-24 (Giorgos Theofanous)	Ian Stratis	Giorgos Papanastasiou	Andreas Leontas	Antonis Fokas
Over 25s (Peggy Zina)	Noena	Alexandros Pitsanis	Pilatos Kounatidis	Giorgos Stefanou
Groups (Thodoris Marantinis)	Gazoza	Stereo Soul	N.M.A.	Aftoi & Afti

== Results summary ==
Key:

–	Contestant was in the bottom two/three and had to sing again in the final showdown
–	Contestant was in the bottom three/four but received the fewest votes and was immediately eliminated

	Week 1	Week 2	Week 3	Week 4	Week 5	Week 6		Week 7		Week 8 - Final	
	Week 1	Week 2	Week 3	Week 4	Week 5	Tuesday	Friday	Tuesday	Friday	Round One	Round Two
Andreas Leontas	Safe	Safe	Safe	Safe	Safe	Safe	Safe	Bottom two	Safe	Safe	Winner
Ian Stratis	Safe	Safe	Safe	Safe	Safe	Bottom two	Safe	Safe	Safe	Safe	Runner-up
Stereo Soul	Safe	Safe	Safe	Safe	Safe	Safe	Safe	Safe	3rd	3rd	Eliminated from Round Two
Tania Breazou	Safe	Safe	Safe	Bottom two	Safe	Safe	Bottom two	Safe	4th	Eliminated (week 7)	
Noena	Safe	Safe	Safe	Safe	Bottom two	Safe	Safe	Bottom two	Eliminated (week 7)		
Alexandros Pitsanis	Safe	Safe	Safe	Safe	Safe	Safe	Bottom two	Eliminated (week 6)			
Pilatos Kounatidis	Safe	Safe	Safe	Safe	Safe	Bottom two	Eliminated (week 6)				
Christiana Mpounia	Safe	Safe	Bottom two	Safe	Bottom two	Eliminated (week 5)					
Christina Zanti	Safe	Bottom three	Safe	Bottom two	Eliminated (week 4)						
Antonis Fokas	Safe	Safe	Bottom two	Eliminated (week 3)							
Aftoi & Afti	Safe	Bottom three	Eliminated (week 2)								
N.M.A	Safe	12th	Eliminated (week 2)								
Giorgos Papanastasiou	13-16th	Eliminated (week 1)									
Giorgos Stefanou	13-16th	Eliminated (week 1)									
Eleni Koskina	13-16th	Eliminated (week 1)									
Gazoza	13-16th	Eliminated (week 1)									
Final showdown	No final showdown or judges' vote: results are based on public votes alone	Aftoi & Afti, Christina Zanti	Antonis Fokas, Christiana Mpounia	Tania Breazou, Christina Zanti	Christiana Mpounia, Noena	Ian Stratis, Pilatos Kounatidis	Tania Breazou, Alexandros Pitsanis	Andreas Leontas, Noena	Tania Breazou, Stereo Soul	No final showdown or judges' vote: results are based on public votes alone	
Theofanou's vote to eliminate	No final showdown or judges' vote: results are based on public votes alone	Aftoi & Afti	Christiana Mpounia	Christina Zanti	Christiana Mpounia	Pilatos Kounatidis	Alexandros Pitsanis	Noena	Stereo Soul	No final showdown or judges' vote: results are based on public votes alone	
Zina's vote to eliminate	No final showdown or judges' vote: results are based on public votes alone	Aftoi & Afti	Antonis Fokas	Christina Zanti	Christiana Mpounia	Ian Stratis	Tania Breazou	Andreas Leontas	Tania Breazou	No final showdown or judges' vote: results are based on public votes alone	
Tamta's vote to eliminate	No final showdown or judges' vote: results are based on public votes alone	Aftoi & Afti	Antonis Fokas	Christina Zanti	Noena	Pilatos Kounatidis	Alexandros Pitsanis	Noena	Stereo Soul	No final showdown or judges' vote: results are based on public votes alone	
Marantini's vote to eliminate	No final showdown or judges' vote: results are based on public votes alone	Christina Zanti	Antonis Fokas	—N/a	Christiana Mpounia	Pilatos Kounatidis	Alexandros Pitsanis	Noena	Tania Breazou	No final showdown or judges' vote: results are based on public votes alone	
Eliminated	Gazoza; Public Vote	N.M.A; Public Vote	Antonis Fokas; 3 of 4 votes Majority	Christina Zanti; 3 of 3 votes Majority	Christiana Mpounia; 3 of 4 votes Majority	Pilatos Kounatidis; 3 of 4 votes Majority	Alexandros Pitsanis; 3 of 4 votes Majority	Noena; 3 of 4 votes Majority	Tania Breazou; 2 of 4 votes Deadlock	Stereo Soul; 3rd Place	Ian Stratis; Runner-Up
Eliminated	Giorgos Papanastasiou; Public Vote	N.M.A; Public Vote	Antonis Fokas; 3 of 4 votes Majority	Christina Zanti; 3 of 3 votes Majority	Christiana Mpounia; 3 of 4 votes Majority	Pilatos Kounatidis; 3 of 4 votes Majority	Alexandros Pitsanis; 3 of 4 votes Majority	Noena; 3 of 4 votes Majority	Tania Breazou; 2 of 4 votes Deadlock	Stereo Soul; 3rd Place	Ian Stratis; Runner-Up
Eliminated	Giorgos Stefanou; Public Vote	Aftoi & Afti; 3 of 4 votes Majority	Antonis Fokas; 3 of 4 votes Majority	Christina Zanti; 3 of 3 votes Majority	Christiana Mpounia; 3 of 4 votes Majority	Pilatos Kounatidis; 3 of 4 votes Majority	Alexandros Pitsanis; 3 of 4 votes Majority	Noena; 3 of 4 votes Majority	Tania Breazou; 2 of 4 votes Deadlock	Stereo Soul; 3rd Place	Andreas Leontas; Winner
Eliminated	Eleni Koskina; Public Vote	Aftoi & Afti; 3 of 4 votes Majority	Antonis Fokas; 3 of 4 votes Majority	Christina Zanti; 3 of 3 votes Majority	Christiana Mpounia; 3 of 4 votes Majority	Pilatos Kounatidis; 3 of 4 votes Majority	Alexandros Pitsanis; 3 of 4 votes Majority	Noena; 3 of 4 votes Majority	Tania Breazou; 2 of 4 votes Deadlock	Stereo Soul; 3rd Place	Andreas Leontas; Winner
