= Mia nihta zoriki =

Mia nihta zoriki Μια νύχτα ζόρικη

Studio album by Paschalis Terzis
- Released: November 3, 2008
- Recorded: 2008
- Genre: Modern laïkó, pop
- Length: 57:25
- Language: Greek
- Label: EMI
- Producer: Giorgos Theofanous

Paschalis Terzis chronology
| I diafora (2007) | Mia nihta zoriki Μια νύχτα ζόρικη (2008) |

Singles from Mia nihta zoriki
- 1. "Kane oti nomizeis" 2. "Mia nihta zoriki" Released: December 11, 2008

Mia nihta zoriki (Greek: Μια νύχτα ζόρικη; English: One tough night) is an album by popular Greek Laïka singer Paschalis Terzis released on November 3, 2008 by Minos EMI. The album is the follow-up to his 2007 platinum album I diafora and is composed entirely by Giorgos Theofanous. It was certified gold on its first day of release and debuted on the Greek Albums Chart at number two.

== Background ==
Released on November 3, 2008, the 14 track Mia nihta zoriki is the follow-up album to Terzis' successful 2007 release I diafora. It was composed entirely by Giorgos Theofanous, with lyrics, apart from a few by Giorgos Theofanous, by Thanos Papanikolaou, Kostas Fasoulas, Andreas Neofytidis and poet Manos Eleftherios. The album was released in two case formats: one in a standard jewel case and the other in a larger paperback case, the latter being marked as a "special edition" by some retailers.

== Promotion ==
Terzis performed his new songs in the first week of the album's release on the Greek The X Factor where composer Theofanous is a judge. He also began performances at club Iera Odos on November 6, 2008, for his sixth winter season there. He sang many songs from his career in addition to his newer tracks, and is accompanied by fellow Greek singer Elena Paparizou.

== Track listing ==
1. "Anthropoi" (Άνθρωποι; People) – 4:09
2. "Kane oti nomizeis" (Κάνε ό,τι νομίζεις; Do what you think) – 4:11
3. "Mia nihta zoriki"(Μια νύχτα ζόρικη; One tough night) – 4:59
4. "Mahairi" (Μαχαίρι; Knife) – 4:06
5. "Ego se pistepsa" (Εγώ σε πίστεψα; I believed you) – 4:14
6. "Anteho" (Αντέχω; I withstand) – 3:58
7. "Akri tou gremou sou na 'mai" (Άκρη του γκρεμού σου να 'μαι; To be on the edge of your cliff) – 3:58
8. "Den Ehei meinei tipota" (Δεν έχει μείνει τίποτα; Nothing is left) – 4:13
9. "Tha to sinithiseis" (Θα το συνηθίσεις; You will get used to it) – 3:44
10. "Th' anametritho" (Θ' αναμετρηθώ; I'll be measured against) – 4:50
11. "Eilikrina" (Ειλικρινά; Honestly) – 3:55
12. "Eipa na thimitho" (Είπα να θυμηθώ; I said to remember) – 3:47
13. "Alaska" (Αλάσκα; Alaska) – 2:59
14. "Tha meineis ouranos" (Θα μείνεις ουρανός; You will remain as the sky) – 4:22

== Singles ==
"Kane oti nomizeis"

The first single from the album is "Kane oti nomizeis" and features lyrics by Thanos Papanikolaou. It was released to radio stations prior to the album's November 3 release date. The music video is directed by Kostas Kapetanidis of Anosi productions.

"Mia nihta zoriki"

The second single from the album was the title track "Mia nihta zoriki". It was released on December 11, 2008 and its lyrics were written by Thanos Papanikolaou.

== Charts and reception ==
Mia nihta zoriki debuted and peaked at number two on the IFPI Greek Albums Chart on week 46 of 2008 and stayed at number two for the following two weeks: 47 and 48. By week 49, it had slipped to number 11, and as of the week 10/2009 charts, it has charted for 14 weeks. The album had certified gold during its first day of release, with the award being handed over soon after.

The album placed at number thirteen on IFPI's Year-end chart for Top 50 Greek albums of 2008, and number fifteen on the Top 50 Greek and International albums of 2008.

| Chart | Providers | Peak position | Certification |
|---|---|---|---|
| Greek Albums Chart | IFPI | 2 | Gold |
| Cypriot Album Chart | Musical Paradise Top 10 | — | — |
| Top 50 Greek Albums of 2008 | IFPI | 13 | — |
| Top 50 Greek and International Albums of 2008 | IFPI | 15 | —|- |
