= Choës =

Choes

Studio album by Giorgos Theofanous
- Released: 29 March 2015 (Cyprus)
- Recorded: Athens, studio Odeon, studio Bi-Kay
- Genre: World music, Folk, Modern Laika
- Length: 47:55
- Language: Greek, Cypriot Greek
- Label: Radio Proto, Simerini
- Producer: Giorgos Theofanous

Giorgos Theofanous chronology
Tragoudo To Nisi Mou (2014)	Choes (2015)

Choës (Greek: Χοές; Libations) is the name of a studio album by Greek-Cypriot composer and producer Giorgos Theofanous. It was released on 29 March 2015 by Radio Proto in a special edition as a covermount with the Sunday edition of the Cypriot newspaper Simerini in Cyprus, on the occasion of the 60th Anniversary of the EOKA Cyprus Liberation Struggle (1955–1959).

The album includes poems by the Cypriot poet and former Minister of Education and Culture of Cyprus Claire Angelides about the heroes of EOKA, that were set to music by Giorgos Theofanous and interpreted by Greek popular singers Marinella, Kostas Makedonas and Dimos Anastasiadis. The presentation of the album was held at the Imprisoned Graves, in the presence of the President of the Republic of Cyprus Nicos Anastasiades, on 27 March 2015.

== Track listing ==
1. "Fones iroon" (Φωνές ηρώων; Heroes' voices) – 2:32
2. "I iroes" (Οι ήρωες; The heroes) – 3:06
3. "Dio Despines (Markos Drakos)" (Δυο Δέσποινες; Two Despinas) – 4:20
4. "Simeoforos (Petrakis Giallouros)" (Σημαιοφόρος; Standard bearer) – 3:22
5. "I istoria tou, mikri (Andreas Paraskevas)" (Η ιστορία του, μικρή; His story was short) – 3:08
6. "Zeibekiko (Andreas Panayidis)" (Ζεϊμπέκικο) – 3:31
7. "Stous Tesseris tou Achirona (Andreas Karyos, Elias Papakyriakou, Fotis Pittas, Christos Samaras)" (Στους Τέσσερις του Αχυρώνα; Dedicated to the Four of Achirona) – 4:50
8. "Charontas (Michalis Karaolis)" (Χάροντας; Charon) – 3:08
9. "O megalos nekros mas (Michalakis Paridis)" (Ο μεγάλος νεκρός μας; Our Great dead) – 3:09
10. "Mana (Loukia Papageorgiou)" (Μάνα; Mother) – 4:45
11. "Louloudas (Dimitrakis Dimitriou)" (Λουδουδάς; Florist) – 3:17
12. "Beethoven (Andreas Zakos)" (Μπετόβεν) – 2:35
13. "Esy anevikes ta skalopatia… (Evagoras Pallikaridis)" (Εσύ ανέβηκες τα σκαλοπάτια; You have climbed the stairs) – 4:50
14. "Defte lavete Fos" (Δεύτε λάβετε Φως; Come receive the Light) – 3:22

== Credits and personnel ==
Personnel

- Marinella – vocals on tracks 1, 2, 7 and 10
- Kostas Makedonas – vocals on tracks 3, 4, 6, 8 and 13, background vocals on track "Stous Tesseris tou Achirona"
- Dimos Anastasiadis – vocals on tracks 5, 9 and 12
- Giorgis Tsouris – narrative
- Marina Verzanli – vocals on track "Louloudas"
- Evangelos Drouzas – vocals on track "Defte lavete Fos", background vocals
- Konstantinos Papachristodoulou, Georgios Vlachopoulos, Apostolos Kalpakidis, Georgios Romiliotis – background vocals
- Giorgos Theofanous – piano
- Leonidas Tzitzos – keyboard
- Giannis Grigoriou – bass
- Grigoris Syntridis – drums, percussion
- Phoebus Zacharopoulos – guitar
- Stavros Papagiannopoulos – bouzouki, baglamas
- Michalis Porfiris – cello
- Alexandros Arkadopoulos – wind
- Hercules Vavatsikas – accordion

Production and design

- Giorgos Theofanous – producer
- Leonidas Tzitzos – arranger and conductor
- Ilias Lakkas – recording engineer in the studio "Odeon"
- Babis Mpiris – recording engineer in the studio "Bikay"
- Nikolas Ntimas – recording engineer on track "Louloudas"
- Giota Efthimiou – artwork

Credits adapted from the album's liner notes.
