= Eleftheria Eleftheriou =

Greek Cypriot singer (born 1989)

Eleftheria Eleftheriou Ελευθερία Ελευθερίου
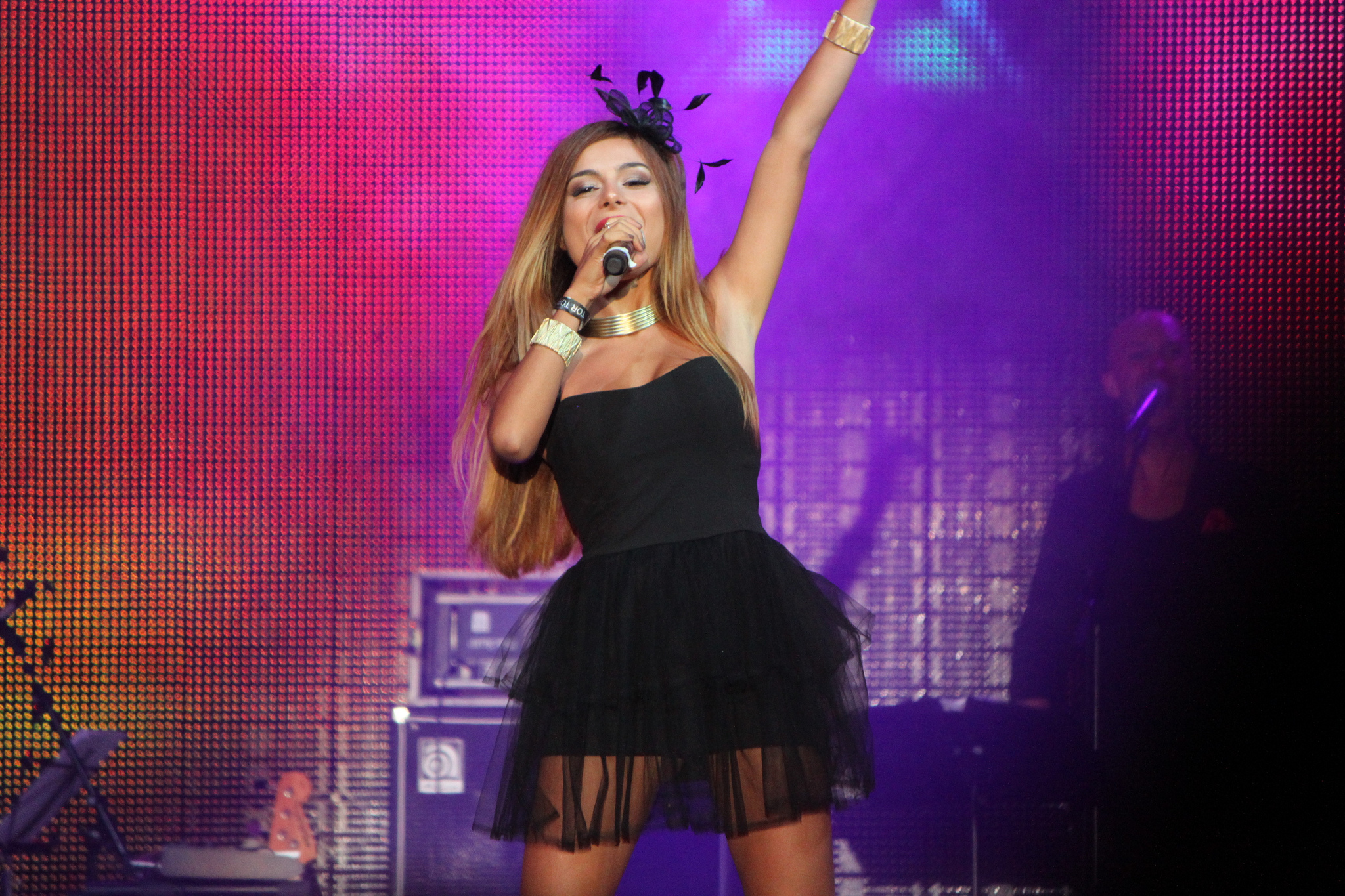
- Eleftheriou performing in August 2012

Background information
- Born: Eleftheria Eleftheriou; 12 May 1989 (age 37); Frenaros, Cyprus
- Genres: Dance, pop
- Occupation: Singer
- Instruments: Vocals, piano
- Years active: 2010–present
- Labels: Sony Music Greece (2010–2011); Universal Music Greece (2011–present)

Eleftheria Eleftheriou (Greek: Ελευθερία Ελευθερίου, IPA: [elefθeˈri.a elefθeˈri.u]; born 12 May 1989) is a Greek Cypriot singer. She came to prominence through her participation in the second season of the Greek version of The X Factor. Shortly after her elimination, Sony Music Greece signed her and submitted her as a candidate to represent Greece in the Eurovision Song Contest 2010. She was later disqualified from the national final, following the leak of her song onto the internet by an unknown party.

Eleftheriou had previously participated in the Cypriot national final for the Eurovision Song Contest 2006 with the song "Play That Melody To Me" featuring Maria Zorli, finishing seventh in the final. Eleftheriou represented Greece in the Eurovision Song Contest 2012, with the song "Aphrodisiac", where she placed 17th.

== Early life ==
Eleftheriou was born and raised in Frenaros. She enjoyed singing, drawing, dancing, and sports as a child. At the age of nine, she started courses at a conservatory. From a young age, she started learning piano, theory, harmony, and history of music. At the age of 15, she started voice lessons, and at age 16, she started participating as a soloist in the Cyprus Broadcasting Corporation's national folk orchestra.

That same year, Eleftheriou was a candidate to represent Cyprus in the Eurovision Song Contest 2006 with the song "Play That Melody to Me" featuring Maria Zorli. Although she qualified to the final from the first semi-final, she finished seventh overall in the national final. Despite not winning the national final, Eleftheriou decided to continue studying music and performance, enrolling at the University of Surrey. She started singing solo in the Cypriot music scenes at the age of 18, and performed in the musical Rent in Nicosia for one season.

== Career ==
=== 2008–2009: The X Factor ===
In 2008, Eleftheriou auditioned for the first season of new talent show The X Factor Greece. Although she received three out of four yeses from the judges and was granted a spot in boot-camp, she decided not to participate in the show. A year later in 2009, Eleftheriou once again tried out for the show, and received four out of four yeses. Despite being a favourite to win, Eleftheriou was voted off the show during the fifth live episode. The host and singer Sakis Rouvas offered her a spot to sing with him at the Club he was appearing for the winter season live on the show, which she accepted.

==== Performances ====
- Live 1 – "Den Milo Gia Mia Nihta Ego" (Original Singer: Eleftheria Arvanitaki)
- Live 2 – "Kopse Kai Mirase Sta Dio" (Original Singer: Eleonora Zouganeli)
- Live 3 – "Kathe Fora Pou Me Kitazeis (Original Singer: Alkistis Protopsalti)
- Live 4 – Opening: "Girls Just wanna have fun"; Competition: "Stin Diskotek" (Original Singer: Elpida)
- Live 5 – "No One" (Original Singer: Alicia Keys)
- Live 9 – "Methismeni Politeia" (Original Singer: Anna Vissi) (Special guest singer on Christmas live special)

=== 2010–2011: Professional debut and Eurovision 2010 ===
Shortly after her elimination, Sony Music Greece signed Eleftheria and submitted her as a candidate to represent Greece in the Eurovision Song Contest 2010. A week before the formal presentation of the songs by Greek broadcast ERT, Eleftheriou's song "Tables are Turning" was leaked onto the web by an unknown party. As a result, the song was disqualified from the national final, while the leak also forced the broadcaster to release the rest of the national final songs prematurely the next day, in fear of further leaks.

Despite the disqualification, she released the song in Greek as "Kentro Tou Kosmou" as the first single off her debut album. A music video was shot and released shortly after. Both Greek and English versions of the song were released as digital downloads on 5 March 2010.

Eleftheriou started appearing with Sakis Rouvas and Tamta at S-Club on 11 December 2009. On 19 August 2010, she started appearing with Nikos Vertis at club Orama in Thessaloniki. Initially scheduled to end by the beginning of October, the shows proved to be a success and have been extended throughout October.

On 6 October 2010, Eleftheriou released her new single titled "Otan Hamilonoume To Fos" (When we dim the lights) with music by Giannis Iermias and lyrics by Faidon Samsidis. In March 2011, Eleftheria was featured on DJ duo HouseTwins' track "Never", credited under the name Elle. An accompanying music video featuring her was also released.

On 1 December 2011, Eleftheriou announced that she had left Sony Music Greece and signed with Universal Music Greece. She stated that it was her choice to leave Sony Music, as Universal Music made her a very good proposal. Eleftheriou further stated that she was currently in the process of searching for new songs to record.

=== 2012–present: Eurovision 2012 ===
On 5 March 2012, it was announced that Eleftheria was one of four acts competing to represent Greece in the Eurovision Song Contest 2012, with the song "Aphrodisiac". On 12 March 2012, Eleftheria won the national selection and represented Greece in the Eurovision Song Contest 2012 which was held in Baku, Azerbaijan. During the contest, Eleftheria was reunited with fellow The X Factor contestant Ivi Adamou who represented Cyprus. In the final she placed 17th (9th on the televoting)

Following Eurovision, in June 2012 Eleftheriou embarked on a summer tour around Greece named the "Aphrodisiac Tour". In July 2012, Eleftheriou released the English language single "Hearts Collide". A music video shot and directed by Kostantinos Rigos on 14 June 2012 at the port of Piraeus, was released on 4 July 2012. "Hearts Collide" is pop-dance song penned by Obeda and Lunggren, and set the style and tone of Eleftheriou's artistic direction going forward.

For the winter season of 2012–2013, she appeared alongside Panos Kiamos at his residency at Club 22 in Athens, Greece. Additionally, she will accompany Kiamos on his Australian tour in June 2013, as well as his summer concerts around Greece. In May 2013, Eleftheriou was featured on Romanian house project Deepcentral's new song "Raindrops". The video was filmed on the island of Cephalonia, and will be released in June 2013 in Greece and Romania. Eleftheria followed up the release with her own solo single in mid-2013 with the name "Teleiosame". She appeared in the series Your Face Sounds Familiar in March 2014. Her first album, Teleiosame, was released in March 2014.

In 2021 she participated in the eighth season of Survivor Greece.

==== Performances on Your Face Sounds Familiar ====
Your Face Sounds Familiar performances and results
| Week | Portraying | Song | Points | Result |
|---|---|---|---|---|
| Week 1 | Britney Spears | "I'm a Slave 4 U" | 12 | 7th place |
| Week 2 | Eleftheria Arvanitaki | "To Parapono" | 13 | 6th place |
| Week 3 | Shakira | "Objection" | 10 | 9th place |
| Week 4 | Panos Kiamos | "Fotia Me Fotia" | 17 | 4th place |
| Week 5 | Eleni Tsaligopoulou | "Na M'agapas" | 21 | 2nd place |
| Week 6 | Paola Foka | "Edo Se Thelo Kardia Mou" | 21 | 2nd place |
| Week 7 | Jennifer Lopez | "Dance Again" | 13 | 5th place |
| Week 8: Eurovision night | Loreen | "Euphoria" | 23 | 1st place |
| Week 9 | Stan | "Paixnidia Erotika" | 16 | 5th place |
| Week 10 | Evridiki | "Poso Ligo Me Ksereis" | 14 | 5th place |
| Week 11 | Christina Aguilera | "Express" | 18 | 3rd place |
| Week 12: Semi-finals | Rita Sakellariou | "Sose Me / Aftos o Anthropos" | 14 | 6th place |
| Week 13: Final | Aliki Vougiouklaki & Dimitris Papamichael | "I Agapi Theli Dio" (duet with Vanessa Adamopoulou) | Did not scored | |
| TOTAL | | | 193 | —N/a |

== Discography ==
=== Digital singles ===
- 2010 – "Kentro Tou Kosmou" (English version: Tables are turning) #3 at Turkish Singles Top 100 as a Tables Are Turning
- 2010 – "Otan Hamilonoume To Fos"
- 2011 – "Never" (Housetwins feat. Elle)
- 2012 – "Aphrodisiac"
- 2012 – "Hearts Collide"
- 2012 – "Pumpin/Apokleistika" (Lucky Man Project feat. Eleftheria)
- 2012 – "Mystiko Mou" (Goin' Through feat. Eleftheria)
- 2012 – "Taksidi Sti Vrohi"
- 2013 – "Raindrops" (Deepcentral feat. Eleftheria)
- 2013 – "Pes Pos Me Thes" (TNS feat. Eleftheria)
- 2013 – "Teleiosame"
- 2014 – "Gia Sena"
- 2014 – "Eternally" (Mindtrap feat. Eleftheria)
- 2014 – "Oso Kai Na Thes" (James Sky feat. Eleftheria)
- 2015 – "Nyxtes Kaftes"
- 2016 – "Ston Kosmo Ton Diko Tis"
- 2017 – "Eish El-Donia" (MKE LDN feat. Tamer Ashour - Eleftheria)
- 2018 – "S' Efharisto"
- 2019 – "Bonita"
- 2019 – "Den Ehoume Shesi" (Eleftheria feat. Tartar)
- 2020 – "Calm Down" (Eleftheria feat. Koki)
- 2020 – "Oi Istories Mas" (Eleftheria feat. Katerina Stikoudi)
- 2021 – "Pame ela"
- 2023 –Sugar Daddy
- 2024 –Se Pira Sovara

=== Music videos ===
- 2010 – "Kentro Tou Kosmou"
- 2011 – "Never" (Housetwins feat. Elle)
- 2012 – "Aphrodisiac" (Promotional music video)
- 2012 – "Hearts Collide"
- 2013 – "Mystiko Mou" (Goin' Through feat. Eleftheria)
- 2013 – "Raindrops" (Deepcentral feat. Eleftheria)
- 2013 – "Pes Pos Me Thes" (TNS feat. Eleftheria)
- 2013 – "Teleiosame"
- 2014 – "Gia Sena"
- 2014 – "Oso Kai Na Thes" (James Sky feat. Eleftheria)
- 2015 – "Nyxtes Kaftes"
- 2019 – "Bonita"
- 2019 – "Den Ehoume Shesi" (Eleftheria feat. Tartar)
- 2020 – "Calm Down" (Eleftheria feat. Koki)
- 2020 – "Oi Istories Mas" (Eleftheria feat. Katerina Stikoudi)
- 2023 –Sugar Daddy
- 2024 –Se Pira Sovara

== Filmography ==
=== Television ===
| Year | Title | Role(s) | Notes |
|---|---|---|---|
| 2006 | A Song for Europe | Herself (contestant) | TV special |
| 2008 | The X Factor | Herself (contestant) | 1 episode; season 1 |
| 2009-2010 | The X Factor | Herself (contestant) | 11th place; season 2 |
| 2010-2011 | The life of the other woman | Herself | 4 episodes |
| 2011 | Elsewhere at dawn | Herself | 2 episodes |
| 2012 | Eurovision Song Contest - Greek Finals | Herself (contestant) | Winner |
| 2012 | Eurovision Song Contest 2012 | Herself (contestant) | TV special |
| 2012 | MAD Video Music Awards | Herself (performance) | TV special |
| 2012-2013 | White Balloons | Evdokia | 50 episodes |
| 2013 | Eurosong: A MAD Show | Herself (performance) | TV special |
| 2014 | Your Face Sounds Familiar | Herself (contestant) | 13 episodes; season 2 |
| 2015 | Cyprus MadWalk | Herself (performance) | TV special |
| 2015-2016 | Twin Moons | Eva Anastasiou | Lead role / 111 episodes |
| 2020-2021 | Survivor Greece | Herself (contestant) | Eliminated; 15th place |
| 2023 | Survivor Greece: All Star | Herself (contestant) | |

== Awards and nominations ==
=== MAD Video Music Awards 2012 ===
| Year | Nominee / work | Award | Result |
|---|---|---|---|
| 2012 | "Never" | Video Clip Dance | Nominated |

=== Cyprus Music Awards ===
| Year | Nominee / work | Award | Result |
|---|---|---|---|
| 2012 | Herself | Best Cypriot Artist | Won |

=== Madame Figaro Awards ===
| Year | Nominee / work | Award | Result |
|---|---|---|---|
| 2012 | Herself | Best Cypriot Artist | Nominated |

=== Lalore02 Awards ===
| Year | Nominee / work | Award | Result |
|---|---|---|---|
| 2013 | "Hearts Collide" | Best Song of the year | Nominated |
| 2013 | "Taksidi Sti Vroxi" | Best Song of the year | Nominated |
| 2014 | "Teleiosame" | Best Song of the year | Won |

| Preceded by Loukas Giorkas (and Stereo Mike) with "Watch My Dance" | Greece in the Eurovision Song Contest; 2012 | Succeeded by Koza Mostra feat. Agathon Iakovidis with "Alcohol Is Free" |
