= The X Factor (Greek TV series) series 7 =

The X Factor
- Series 7
- Hosted by: Andreas Georgiou; Ilias Bogdanos; Katerina Lioliou
- Judges: Christos Mastoras; Mariza Rizou; Stelios Rokkos; Michalis Kouinelis; Ilias Psinakis (live shows); Nikos Mouratidis (live shows)
- Winner: Katerina Lazaridou
- Runner-up: Aggelos Archaniotakis

Release
- Original network: Mega Channel; Alpha TV Cyprus
- Original release: March 18, 2022 – present

Series chronology
- ← Previous; Series 6

The X Factor is a Greek and Cypriot television music competition to find new singing talent. The seventh series began airing on Mega Channel on March 18, 2022. Singer Christos Mastoras returned as judge for his second season, and three new judges joined, singer Mariza Rizou, singer and songwriter Stelios Rokkos and singer and songwriter Michalis Kouinelis, who replaced Giorgos Theofanous, Melina Aslanidou and Michael Tsaousopoulos. The director and actor Andreas Georgiou takes over the presentation of the live shows, who replaced Despina Vandi. Singer Ilias Bogdanos and singer Katerina Lioliou were the backstage-hosts, who replaced Aris Makris. Ilias Psinakis was the guest judge only in the live shows. Nikos Mouratidis was the guest judge only in the live shows since the fourth week.

== Judges and presenters ==
On February 1, 2022, Mega Channel announced that Christos Mastoras will return for his second season and with Mariza Rizou, Stelios Rokkos and Michalis Kouinelis, as the judges. Also the two backstage-hosts were announced, Ilias Bogdanos and Katerina Lioliou. On February 15, 2022, it was announced that Andreas Georgiou will be the host of the live shows.

== Four-chair challenge ==
40 acts faced the four-chair challenge, 10 from each team. The challenges were broadcast on 28 April, 29 April, 5 May and 12 May.

Key:

– Contestant was immediately eliminated after performance without given a chair
– Contestant was given a chair but swapped out later in the competition and eventually eliminated
– Contestant was given a chair and made the final four of their own team

Episode	Mentor	Order	Act	Song	Mentor's decision	Swapped with
Episode 14 (28 April)	Mariza Rizou	1	Natalia Corvington	"Read All About It"	Put in chair 1	–
Episode 14 (28 April)	Mariza Rizou	2	Evelina Katsiakou	"Thalasses"	Put in chair 2	–
Episode 14 (28 April)	Mariza Rizou	3	Sokratis Xaris	"Jealous"	Put in chair 3	–
Episode 14 (28 April)	Mariza Rizou	4	Tolis Papadopoulos	"Megalos Erotas"	Put in chair 4	–
Episode 14 (28 April)	Mariza Rizou	5	Case Zero	"Superstition"	Put in chair 4	Tolis Papadopoulos
Episode 14 (28 April)	Mariza Rizou	6	Aggelos Archaniotakis	"No Time to Die"	Put in chair 1	Natalia Corvington
Episode 14 (28 April)	Mariza Rizou	7	Epoches	"Mazi Sou"	Eliminated	–
Episode 14 (28 April)	Mariza Rizou	8	Artemis Kiriakopoulou	"Stone Cold"	Put in chair 3	Sokratis Xaris
Episode 14 (28 April)	Mariza Rizou	9	Irodotos Miltiadous	"Triadafilleni"	Eliminated	–
Episode 14 (28 April)	Mariza Rizou	10	Christos Adamopoulos	"O Vithos sou"	Put in chair 3	Artemis Kiriakopoulou
Episode 15 (29 May)	Michalis Kouinelis	1	Ilektra Asithianaki	"You Don't Own Me"	Put in chair 1	–
Episode 15 (29 May)	Michalis Kouinelis	2	Nikolas Konstantinou	"De Fevgo"	Put in chair 2	–
Episode 15 (29 May)	Michalis Kouinelis	3	Ioli Pedara	"Dance Monkey"	Put in chair 3	–
Episode 15 (29 May)	Michalis Kouinelis	4	Vasilis Mitsios	"Ela pou Fovamai"	Put in chair 4	–
Episode 15 (29 May)	Michalis Kouinelis	5	Anima	"Adecho"	Eliminated	–
Episode 15 (29 May)	Michalis Kouinelis	6	Giannis Papapetrou	"Billie Jean"	Eliminated	–
Episode 15 (29 May)	Michalis Kouinelis	7	Miltos Charovas	"Another Love"	Put in chair 2	Nikolas Konstantinou
Episode 15 (29 May)	Michalis Kouinelis	8	Duke	"Lose Yourself"	Eliminated	–
Episode 15 (29 May)	Michalis Kouinelis	9	Giname	"Tetoia Nychta mi Rotisis"	Put in chair 4	Vasilis Mitsios
Episode 15 (29 May)	Michalis Kouinelis	10	Giannis Onisiforou	"Dancing On My Own"	Put in chair 1	Ilektra Asithianaki
Episode 16 (5 May)	Stelios Rokkos	1	Kristiana Chatzopoulou	"Bad Romance"	Put in chair 1	–
Episode 16 (5 May)	Stelios Rokkos	2	Despina Leodi	"De Milame"	Eliminated	–
Episode 16 (5 May)	Stelios Rokkos	3	Ocean DVST	"Havana"	Put in chair 2	–
Episode 16 (5 May)	Stelios Rokkos	4	Faith Pandac	"Talking to the Moon"	Put in chair 3	–
Episode 16 (5 May)	Stelios Rokkos	5	Lina Alatsidou	"Parapono (I Xenitia)"	Put in chair 4	–
Episode 16 (5 May)	Stelios Rokkos	6	Thanos Lambrou	"Sign of the Times"	Put in chair 3	Faith Pandac
Episode 16 (5 May)	Stelios Rokkos	7	Decho	"Stis Ekklisias tin Porta"/"Wake Me Up"	Put in chair 2	Ocean DVST
Episode 16 (5 May)	Stelios Rokkos	8	JCJO	"Make It Rain"	Put in chair 1	Kristiana Chatzopoulou
Episode 16 (5 May)	Stelios Rokkos	9	Sofia Salvaridou	"Hello"	Eliminated	–
Episode 16 (5 May)	Stelios Rokkos	10	Elena Panagiotidou	"Emena Na Akous"	Put in chair 4	Lina Alatsidou
Episode 17 (12 May)	Christos Mastoras	1	Shady	"Sto Xthes tha Zeis"	Put in chair 1	–
Episode 17 (12 May)	Christos Mastoras	2	The Music Couple	"Easy on Me"	Put in chair 2	–
Episode 17 (12 May)	Christos Mastoras	3	Pavlos Asprogerakas	"Pou na 'sai"	Put in chair 3	–
Episode 17 (12 May)	Christos Mastoras	4	Elpida Aslanidou	"She Used to Be Mine"	Put in chair 4	–
Episode 17 (12 May)	Christos Mastoras	5	Borek	"Otan Se Eixa Protodei"	Put in chair 1	Shady
Episode 17 (12 May)	Christos Mastoras	6	Apostolia Andreadou	"My Love"	Eliminated	–
Episode 17 (12 May)	Christos Mastoras	7	Aristea Alexandraki	"River"	Put in chair 2	The Music Couple
Episode 17 (12 May)	Christos Mastoras	8	Alexandros Razis	"Sigxorese Me"	Eliminated	–
Episode 17 (12 May)	Christos Mastoras	9	Konstantinos Ntasios	"Rock n' Roll Sto Krevati"	Put in chair 3	Pavlos Asprogerakas
Episode 17 (12 May)	Christos Mastoras	10	Katerina Lazaridou	"Ego S' Agapisa Edo"	Put in chair 4	Elpida Aslanidou

== Contestants ==
The top 16 acts were confirmed as follows:

Key:

– Winner
– Runner-up

Contestant	Age(s)	Hometown	Mentor	Result
Katerina Lazaridou	24	Thessaloniki	Christos Mastoras	Winner
Aggelos Archaniotakis	19	Cyprus	Mariza Rizou	Runner-up
Elena Panagiotidou	23	Thessaloniki	Stelios Rokkos	3rd Place
Christos Adamopoulos	25	Athens	Mariza Rizou	4th place
Giname	N/A	Ioannina	Michalis Kouinelis	5th place
Evelina Katsiakou	27	Nafplio	Mariza Rizou	6th-8th place
Giannis Onisiforou	21	Cyprus	Michalis Kouinelis	6th-8th place
Thanos Lambrou	21	Athens	Stelios Rokkos	6th-8th place
Miltos Charovas	17	Rhodes	Michalis Kouinelis	9th place
JCJO	27	Thessaloniki	Stelios Rokkos	10th place
Konstantinos Ntasios	18	Epirus	Christos Mastoras	11th place
Borek	35	Athens	Christos Mastoras	12th place
Decho	N/A	N/A	Stelios Rokkos	13th-14th place
Ioli Pedara	26	Thessaloniki	Michalis Kouinelis	13th-14th place
Aristea Alexandraki	21	Crete	Christos Mastoras	15th-16th place
Case Zero	N/A	N/A	Mariza Rizou	15th-16th place

== Live shows ==
The contestants were announced after each team performed at Four-chair challenge. There were 16 contestants (4 from each team). The Live Shows began airing on 22 May 2022.

=== Results summary ===
Colour key

Act in team Mariza Rizou
Act in team Christos Mastoras
Act in team Michalis Kouinelis
Act in team Stelios Rokkos

–	Act was in the bottom two and had to perform again in the sing-off
–	Act was in the bottom three but was saved by Ilias Psinakis and did not have to perform in the sing-off
–	Act received the fewest public votes and was immediately eliminated (no sing-off)
–	Act did not perform on that particular week

	Week 1	Week 2	Week 3	Week 4	Week 5	Week 6	Semi-Final	Final
Katerina Lazaridou	Safe		Safe	Safe	Safe	Safe	Safe	Winner
Aggelos Archaniotakis	Saved		Safe	Bottom three	Safe	Safe	Safe	Runner-up
Elena Panagiotidou		Safe	Safe	Safe	Safe	Safe	Safe	3rd place
Christos Adamopoulos	Safe		Safe	Safe	Safe	Safe	Safe	4th place
Giname		Safe	Safe	Safe	Safe		Safe	5th place
Evelina Katsiakou	Safe		Safe	Safe	Safe	Safe	6th-8th	Eliminated (semi-final)
Giannis Onisiforou		Safe	Safe	Bottom three	Safe	Bottom three	6th-8th	Eliminated (semi-final)
Thanos Lambrou		Saved	Safe	Safe	Bottom three	Bottom three	6th-8th	Eliminated (semi-final)
Miltos Charovas		Saved	Safe	Safe	Bottom three	Bottom three	Eliminated (week 6)	
JCJO		Safe	Bottom three	Safe	Bottom three	Eliminated (week 5)		
Konstantinos Ntasios	Safe		Bottom three	Bottom three	Eliminated (week 4)			
Borek	Saved		Bottom three	Eliminated (week 3)				
Decho		13th-14th	Eliminated (week 2)					
Ioli Pedara		13th-14th	Eliminated (week 2)					
Aristea Alexandraki	15th-16th	Eliminated (week 1)						
Case Zero	15th-16th	Eliminated (week 1)						
Saved By Psinakis	Aggelos Archaniotakis	Miltos Charovas	JCJO	Aggelos Archaniotakis	Miltos Charovas	Thanos Lambrou	No final showdown or judges' vote: results are based on public votes alone	
Saved By Psinakis	Borek	Thanos Lambrou	JCJO	Aggelos Archaniotakis	Miltos Charovas	Thanos Lambrou	No final showdown or judges' vote: results are based on public votes alone	
Final showdown	No final showdown or judges' vote: results are based on public votes alone		Borek	Giannis Onisiforou	JCJO	Giannis Onisiforou	No final showdown or judges' vote: results are based on public votes alone	
Final showdown	No final showdown or judges' vote: results are based on public votes alone		Konstantinos Ntasios	Konstantinos Ntasios	Thanos Lambrou	Miltos Charovas	No final showdown or judges' vote: results are based on public votes alone	
Judges voted to	No final showdown or judges' vote: results are based on public votes alone		Eliminate				No final showdown or judges' vote: results are based on public votes alone	
Rizou' vote	No final showdown or judges' vote: results are based on public votes alone		Borek	Konstantinos Ntasios	Thanos Lambrou	Giannis Onisiforou	No final showdown or judges' vote: results are based on public votes alone	
Mastoras' vote	No final showdown or judges' vote: results are based on public votes alone		Borek (×2)	Giannis Onisiforou	JCJO	Giannis Onisiforou	No final showdown or judges' vote: results are based on public votes alone	
Kouinelis' vote	No final showdown or judges' vote: results are based on public votes alone		Konstantinos Ntasios	Konstantinos Ntasios	Thanos Lambrou	Miltos Charovas (×2)	No final showdown or judges' vote: results are based on public votes alone	
Rokkos' vote	No final showdown or judges' vote: results are based on public votes alone		Konstantinos Ntasios	Konstantinos Ntasios	JCJO (×2)	Miltos Charovas	No final showdown or judges' vote: results are based on public votes alone	
Eliminated	Aristea Alexandraki; Public Vote	Decho; Public Vote	Borek; 3 of 5 votes Majority	Konstantinos Ntasios; 3 of 4 votes Majority	JCJO; 3 of 5 votes Majority	Miltos Charovas; 3 of 5 votes Majority		
Eliminated	Case Zero; Public Vote	Ioli Pedara; Public Vote	Borek; 3 of 5 votes Majority	Konstantinos Ntasios; 3 of 4 votes Majority	JCJO; 3 of 5 votes Majority	Miltos Charovas; 3 of 5 votes Majority		

=== Live show details ===
==== Week 1 (22 May) ====
- Opening Performance: Mariza Rizou and her team: ("Petao") and Christos Mastoras and his team: ("Ola moiazoun kalokairi"/"Sweat (A La La La La Long)")

In the first live show, only the teams of Christos Mastoras and Mariza Rizou competed. This week's results show featured a double elimination, one from each team. This week's judge Ilias Psinakis had the power to give immunity to two contestants from each team. The act with the fewest public votes was then automatically eliminated.

Contestants' performances on the first live show
Act	Mentor	Order	Song	Result
Aristea Alexandraki	Christos Mastoras	1	"Fotiá"	Eliminated
Konstantinos Ntasios	Christos Mastoras	2	"I Wanna Be Your Slave"	Safe
Evelina Katsiakou	Mariza Rizou	3	"Xenos gia senane kai ehthros"	Safe
Aggelos Archaniotakis	Mariza Rizou	4	"Toxic"	Saved By Psinakis
Case Zero	Mariza Rizou	5	"Smells Like Teen Spirit"	Eliminated
Katerina Lazaridou	Christos Mastoras	6	"Ela Kai Ragise Ton Kosmo Mou"	Safe
Borek	Christos Mastoras	7	"Freestyler"/"Clint Eastwood"	Saved By Psinakis
Christos Adamopoulos	Mariza Rizou	8	"Melisses"	Safe
No Final Showdown

==== Week 2 (29 May) ====
- Opening Performance: Stelios Rokkos and his team: ("Aggeloi") and Michalis Kouinelis and his team ("Still D.R.E."/"Everybody's Got to Learn Sometime"/"To Spourgiti")

In the second live show, only the teams of Stelios Rokkos and Michalis Kouinelis competed. This week's results show featured a double elimination, one from each team. This week's judge Ilias Psinakis had the power to give immunity to two contestants from each team. The act with the fewest public votes was then automatically eliminated.

Contestants' performances on the second live show
Act	Mentor	Order	Song	Result
Miltos Charovas	Michalis Kouinelis	1	"Pio Poli"	Saved By Psinakis
Decho	Stelios Rokkos	2	"Opou Kai Na Pao"/"Maniac"	Eliminated
JCJO	Stelios Rokkos	3	"My Life Is Going On"	Safe
Ioli Pedara	Michalis Kouinelis	4	"Break My Heart"	Eliminated
Giname	Michalis Kouinelis	5	"Diodia"/"Ebodia"	Safe
Elena Panagiotidou	Stelios Rokkos	6	"Gia pou to 'vales kardia mou"	Safe
Thanos Lambrou	Stelios Rokkos	7	"Blinding Lights"	Saved By Psinakis
Giannis Onisiforou	Michalis Kouinelis	8	"Hallelujah"	Safe
No Final Showdown

==== Week 3 (5 June) ====
All the teams were to perform on the same night for first time this series. The three acts with the fewest votes were announced as the bottom three, and judge Ilias Psinakis had the power to give immunity one of the acts of the bottom three. The remaining two acts then performed in the final showdown for the judges' votes.

Contestants' performances on the third live show
Act	Mentor	Order	Song	Result
Borek	Christos Mastoras	1	"Levitating"	Bottom three
Christos Adamopoulos	Mariza Rizou	2	"An"	Safe
Miltos Charovas	Michalis Kouinelis	3	"Love Yourself"	Safe
Elena Panagiotidou	Stelios Rokkos	4	"Edeka Para"	Safe
Aggelos Archaniotakis	Mariza Rizou	5	"It's a Sin"	Safe
Katerina Lazaridou	Christos Mastoras	6	"Amarties"	Safe
JCJO	Stelios Rokkos	7	"Way Down We Go"	Bottom three; Saved By Psinakis
Thanos Lambrou	Stelios Rokkos	8	"Ragismena Gialia"	Safe
Konstantinos Ntasios	Christos Mastoras	9	"Esorouha"	Bottom three
Giannis Onisiforou	Michalis Kouinelis	10	"Arcade"	Safe
Giname	Michalis Kouinelis	11	"Mono Ex Epafis"/"Diiris Psihi"	Safe
Evelina Katsiakou	Mariza Rizou	12	"Afti i nyhta menei"	Safe
Sing-off details
Konstantinos Ntasios	Christos Mastoras	1	"Tosa Kalokairia"	Saved
Borek	Christos Mastoras	2	"Everybody (Backstreet's Back)"	Eliminated

Judges' votes to eliminate

- Rizou: Borek
- Mastoras: Borek (×2)
- Kouinelis: Konstantinos Ntasios
- Rokkos: Konstantinos Ntasios

==== Week 4 (19 June) ====
The three acts with the fewest votes were announced as the bottom three, and judge Ilias Psinakis had the power to give immunity one of the acts of the bottom three. The remaining two acts then performed in the final showdown for the judges' votes.

Contestants' performances on the fourth live show
Act	Mentor	Order	Song	Result
Giname	Michalis Kouinelis	1	"Poso"/"Smooth"	Safe
Christos Adamopoulos	Mariza Rizou	2	"Oneiro Apatilo"	Safe
Thanos Lambrou	Stelios Rokkos	3	"One Way or Another"	Safe
Konstantinos Ntasios	Christos Mastoras	4	"Den Xoras Pouthena"	Bottom three
Elena Panagiotidou	Stelios Rokkos	5	"Etsi Agapao Ego"	Safe
Katerina Lazaridou	Christos Mastoras	6	"Mazi sou"	Safe
Miltos Charovas	Michalis Kouinelis	7	"Treat You Better"	Safe
JCJO	Stelios Rokkos	8	"To Palio Mou Palto"	Safe
Aggelos Archaniotakis	Mariza Rizou	9	"Montero (Call Me by Your Name)"	Bottom three; Saved By Psinakis
Evelina Katsiakou	Mariza Rizou	10	"Otan Pinei mia Gynaika"	Safe
Giannis Onisiforou	Michalis Kouinelis	11	"Take Me to Church"	Bottom three
Sing-off details
Giannis Onisiforou	Michalis Kouinelis	1	"Fool's Gold"	Saved
Konstantinos Ntasios	Christos Mastoras	2	"Personal Jesus"	Eliminated

Judges' votes to eliminate

- Rizou: Konstantinos Ntasios
- Mastoras: Giannis Onisiforou
- Kouinelis: Konstantinos Ntasios
- Rokkos: Konstantinos Ntasios

==== Week 5 (26 June) ====
The three acts with the fewest votes were announced as the bottom three, and judge Ilias Psinakis had the power to give immunity one of the acts of the bottom three. The remaining two acts then performed in the final showdown for the judges' votes.

Contestants' performances on the fifth live show
Act	Mentor	Order	Song	Result
Miltos Charovas	Michalis Kouinelis	1	"Mia Zoi Mazi"	Bottom three; Saved By Psinakis
Evelina Katsiakou	Mariza Rizou	2	"Ta Kormia kai ta Maxairia"	Safe
Thanos Lambrou	Stelios Rokkos	3	"Tha pio apopse to Feggari"	Bottom three
Giname	Michalis Kouinelis	4	"Exotiko Harmani"	Safe
Giannis Onisiforou	Michalis Kouinelis	5	"Stay with Me"	Safe
Katerina Lazaridou	Christos Mastoras	6	"Ta Leme"	Safe
JCJO	Stelios Rokkos	7	"Are You Gonna Be My Girl"	Bottom three
Christos Adamopoulos	Mariza Rizou	8	"To Venzinadiko"	Safe
Aggelos Archaniotakis	Mariza Rizou	9	"Time Is Running Out"	Safe
Elena Panagiotidou	Stelios Rokkos	10	"Ti na to Kano"	Safe
Sing-off details
JCJO	Stelios Rokkos	1	"Beggin'"	Eliminated
Thanos Lambrou	Stelios Rokkos	2	"Imagine"	Saved

Judges' votes to eliminate

- Rizou: Thanos Lambrou
- Mastoras: JCJO
- Kouinelis: Thanos Lambrou
- Rokkos: JCJO (×2)

==== Week 6 (3 July) ====
The three acts with the fewest votes were announced as the bottom three, and judge Ilias Psinakis had the power to give immunity one of the acts of the bottom three. The remaining two acts then performed in the final showdown for the judges' votes.

Due to personal reasons, the group Giname were unable to perform. They were given a bye to the following week.

Contestants' performances on the sixth live show
Act	Mentor	Order	Song	Result
Elena Panagiotidou	Stelios Rokkos	1	"Tha Spaso Koupes"	Safe
Miltos Charovas	Michalis Kouinelis	2	"Oti Pio Omorfo Eho Dei"	Bottom three
Thanos Lambrou	Stelios Rokkos	3	"S'eho Erotefthi"	Bottom three; Saved By Psinakis
Aggelos Archaniotakis	Mariza Rizou	4	"Bohemian Rhapsody"	Safe
Giannis Onisiforou	Michalis Kouinelis	5	"Always Remember Us This Way"	Bottom three
Katerina Lazaridou	Christos Mastoras	6	"Den Eho Idea"	Safe
Christos Adamopoulos	Mariza Rizou	7	"O Amlet Tis Selinis"	Safe
Evelina Katsiakou	Mariza Rizou	8	"To Dikio mou"	Safe
Sing-off details
Giannis Onisiforou	Michalis Kouinelis	1	"Too Close"	Saved
Miltos Charovas	Michalis Kouinelis	2	"Opos Ego"	Eliminated

Judges' votes to eliminate

- Rizou: Giannis Onisiforou
- Mastoras: Giannis Onisiforou
- Kouinelis: Miltos Charovas (×2)
- Rokkos: Miltos Charovas

==== Week 7: Semi-Final (8 July) ====
Contestants' performances on the Semi-Final
Act	Mentor	Order	Song	Result
Thanos Lambrou	Stelios Rokkos	1	"Hold Back the River"	
Giannis Onisiforou	Michalis Kouinelis	2	"Falling"	
Evelina Katsiakou	Mariza Rizou	3	"Lioma se Gkremo"	
Christos Adamopoulos	Mariza Rizou	4	"Fila me"	
Katerina Lazaridou	Christos Mastoras	5	"Trava Skandali"	
Giname	Michalis Kouinelis	6		
		7		
		8		
No Final Showdown
