= Nikolas Metaxas =

Cypriot American singer and songwriter (born 1988)

Nikolas Metaxas Νικόλας Μεταξάς
- Born: February 25, 1988 (age 37); Queens, New York, United States
- Origin: Cyprus
- Genres: Rock, pop, alternative
- Years active: 2008–present

Nikolas Metaxas (born February 25, 1988) is a Cypriot-American singer and songwriter who became famous after coming second in the first season of the Greek version of The X Factor.

Nikolas Metaxas participated as the songwriter and composer of the Cypriot entry at the Eurovision Song Contest 2009 in Moscow, Russia as his younger sister Christina Metaxa won the national final on February 7, 2009. Nikolas himself participated in Cyprus's national final for Eurovision Song Contest 2008 finishing four points behind the eventual winner Evdokia Kadi.

He released his first album, after The X Factor contest, Square one on April 17, 2011.
