= Stavros Michalakakos =

Greek Cypriot singer (born 1987)

Stavros Michalakakos Σταύρος Μιχαλακάκος
- Born: 9 April 1987 (age 37)
- Origin: Limassol, Cyprus
- Genres: Pop
- Years active: 2009-present
- Labels: Sony Music Greece

Stavros Michalakakos (in Greek Σταύρος Μιχαλακάκος) (born 9 April 1987) is a Greek Cypriot singer. On 12 February 2010 he won the second season of the Greek version of the television singing competition The X Factor. He was awarded a recording contract and a car. Michalakakos is the second Cypriot to have won the Greek competition, after Loukas Giorkas won the first season.

Michalakakos' debut single, "Vres To Nisi" (Find the Island), a Greek-language cover of the 1979 Nick Lowe single "Cruel to Be Kind" with lyrics by Nikos Moraitis, was digitally released on 11 June 2010.

Preceded by Loukas Giorkas	The X Factor (Greece); Winner; 2010	Succeeded by Haris Antoniou
