= The X Factor (Greek TV series) series 2 =

The X Factor
- Series 2
- Hosted by: Sakis Rouvas (live shows); Giorgos Lianos (audition shows); Despina Kampouri (audition shows)
- Judges: George Levendis; Giorgos Theofanous; Katerina Gagaki; Nikos Mouratidis
- Winner: Stavros Michalakakos
- Runner-up: Nini Shermadini

Release
- Original network: ANT1
- Original release: 2 October 2009 – 12 February 2010

Series chronology
- ← Previous; Series 1 Next → Series 3

The second series of the Greek music talent show The X Factor began airing on ANT1 on 2 October 2009, and was won by Stavros Michalakakos of Limassol (Lemesos), Cyprus on 12 February 2010. The show was presented for a second year by Sakis Rouvas. It was also broadcast abroad via ANT1's international stations. The series featured Eleftheria Eleftheriou and Ivi Adamou who both participated in the Eurovision Song Contest 2012 representing Greece and Cyprus as well as Hovig who represented Cyprus in the Eurovision Song Contest 2017. Also the runner up of the series, Nini Shermadini, was one of the Georgian backing vocalists.

== Selection process ==
Public auditions by aspiring pop singers began in July 2009 and were held in three cities; Athens and Thessaloniki (Greece) and Larnaka (Cyprus). All four series 1 judges, George Levendis, Giorgos Theofanous, Katerina Gagaki and Nikos Mouratidis returned to judge the contestants. Following initial auditions, in September 2009, around 200 acts attended the boot camp. The contestants were initially split into groups of three, and judges gave instant decisions on who would leave based on the group performances, bringing the number of acts down to 150. The judges then cut the number of acts down to 80. These were split into four categories: Boys, Girls, Over 25s and Groups, before the judges discovered which category they would mentor for the rest of the competition. In series 2, the Boys (16–24) are being mentored by Nikos Mouratidis, Giorgos Theofanous has the Girls (16–24), Katerina Gagaki mentors the Over 25s, and George Levendis takes charge of the Groups. At the last stage of boot camp, the 80 acts were reduced to 32. During "Judges' Houses", the 32 acts were reduced to 16, who went on to the live finals, with one act being eliminated each week by a combination of public vote and judges' decision until a winner was found.

== Contestants and categories ==
The top 16 acts were confirmed as follows:

Key:

– Winner
– Runner-up
– Third Place

Category (mentor)	Acts			
Groups (George Levendis)	360 Moires	48 Ores	Pale Faces	X-odos
Boys 16-24 (Nikos Mouratidis)	Dimitris Maniatis	Nikiforos	Stavros Michalakakos	Hovig Demirjian
Over 25s (Katerina Gagaki)	Eleni Alexandri	Polina Christodoulou	Elena Andreou	Harikleia Charitsavvidou
Girls 16-24 (Giorgos Theofanous)	Giouli Tassou	Ivi Adamou	Eleftheria Eleftheriou	Nini Shermadini

== Live shows ==
The live shows started on 30 October 2009. The acts are performing every Friday night with the results announced on the same day. As a marked difference from series 1, in this series the televoters have the chance to vote from the beginning of the show.

=== Results summary ===
Colour key

–	Contestant was in the bottom two/three and had to sing again in the final showdown

Table showing weekly results, indicating which contestants were eliminated or safe, how each judge voted, and positions in each week's public vote where known.
	Week 1	Week 2	Week 3	Week 4	Week 5	Week 6	Week 7	Week 8	Week 10	Week 11	Week 12	Week 13	Week 14	Week 15	
Stavros Michalakakos	Safe	Safe	Safe	Safe	Safe	Safe	Safe	Safe	Safe	Safe	Safe	4th	Safe	Winner	
Nini Shermadini	Safe	Safe	Safe	Safe	Safe	Safe	Safe	Safe	Bottom 2	Safe	Bottom 2	Safe	Safe	Runner-Up	
48 Ores	Safe	Safe	Safe	Safe	Safe	10th	Safe	Safe	Safe	Safe	Safe	Safe	3rd	3rd	
Eleni Alexandri	Safe	Safe	Safe	Safe	Safe	Safe	Safe	Safe	Safe	Safe	Safe	Safe	4th	Eliminated (week 14)	
Polina Christodoulou	Safe	Safe	Safe	Safe	Safe	Safe	Safe	Bottom 2	Safe	Safe	Safe	5th	Eliminated (week 13)		
Ivi Adamou	Safe	Safe	Safe	Safe	Safe	Safe	Safe	Safe	Safe	Bottom 2	Bottom 2	Eliminated (week 12)			
Hovig Demirjian	Safe	Safe	Safe	Safe	Safe	Safe	9th	Safe	Safe	Bottom 2	Eliminated (week 11)				
Nikiforos	Bottom 2	Safe	Safe	Safe	Safe	Safe	Safe	Safe	Bottom 2	Eliminated (week 10)					
Dimitris Maniatis	Safe	Safe	Safe	Safe	Safe	Safe	Safe	Bottom 2	Eliminated (week 8)						
Pale Faces	Safe	Safe	Bottom 2	Safe	12th	Safe	10th	Eliminated (week 7)							
360 Moires	Safe	Safe	Safe	Bottom 2	Safe	11th	Eliminated (week 6)								
Eleftheria Eleftheriou	Safe	Safe	Safe	Safe	11th	Eliminated (week 5)									
Elena Andreou	Safe	Safe	Safe	Bottom 2	Eliminated (week 4)										
Harikleia Charitsavvidou	Safe	Bottom 2	Bottom 2	Eliminated (week 3)											
Giouli Tassou	Safe	Bottom 2	Eliminated (week 2)												
X-odos	Bottom 2	Eliminated (week 1)													
Final showdown	Nikiforos, X-odos	Giouli Tassou, Harikleia Charitsavvidou	Harikleia Charitsavvidou, Pale Faces	360 Moires, Elena Andreou	Eleftheria Eleftheriou, Pale Faces	360 Moires, 48 Ores	Hovig Demirjian, Pale Faces	Dimitris Maniatis, Polina Christodoulou	Nikiforos, Nini Shermadini	Hovig Demirjian, Ivi Adamou	Ivi Adamou, Nini Shermadini	Polina Christodoulou, Stavros Michalakakos	48 Ores, Eleni Alexandri	No final showdown or judges' vote: results are based on public votes alone	
Mouratidis's vote to eliminate	X-odos	Giouli Tassou	Harikleia Charitsavvidou	Elena Andreou	Eleftheria Eleftheriou	360 Moires	Pale Faces	Polina Christodoulou	Nini Shermadini	Ivi Adamou	Ivi Adamou	Polina Christodoulou	Eleni Alexandri	No final showdown or judges' vote: results are based on public votes alone	
Gagaki's vote to eliminate	X-odos	Giouli Tassou	Pale Faces	360 Moires	Eleftheria Eleftheriou	360 Moires	Hovig Demirjian	Dimitris Maniatis	Nikiforos	Hovig Demirjian	Nini Shermadini	Stavros Michalakakos	48 Ores	No final showdown or judges' vote: results are based on public votes alone	
Levendis's vote to eliminate	Nikiforos	Giouli Tassou	Harikleia Charitsavvidou	Elena Andreou	Eleftheria Eleftheriou	360 Moires	Hovig Demirjian	Dimitris Maniatis	Nikiforos	Hovig Demirjian	Ivi Adamou	Polina Christodoulou	Eleni Alexandri	No final showdown or judges' vote: results are based on public votes alone	
Theofanous's vote to eliminate	X-odos	Harikleia Charitsavvidou	Harikleia Charitsavvidou	Elena Andreou	Pale Faces	360 Moires	Pale Faces	Dimitris Maniatis	Nikiforos	Hovig Demirjian	Nini Shermadini	Stavros Michalakakos	48 Ores	No final showdown or judges' vote: results are based on public votes alone	
Eliminated	X-odos; 3 of 4 votes Majority	Giouli Tassou; 3 of 4 votes Majority	Harikleia Charitsavvidou; 3 of 4 votes Majority	Elena Andreou; 3 of 4 votes Majority	Eleftheria Eleftheriou; 3 of 4 votes Majority	360 Moires; 4 of 4 votes Majority	Pale Faces; 2 of 4 votes Deadlock	Dimitris Maniatis; 3 of 4 votes Majority	Nikiforos; 3 of 4 votes Majority	Hovig Demirjian; 3 of 4 votes Majority	Ivi Adamou; 3 of 5 votes Majority	Polina Christodoulou; 2 of 4 votes Deadlock	Eleni Alexandri; 2 of 4 votes Deadlock	Nini Shermadini; Runner-Up	Stavros Michalakakos; Winner
Eliminated	X-odos; 3 of 4 votes Majority	Giouli Tassou; 3 of 4 votes Majority	Harikleia Charitsavvidou; 3 of 4 votes Majority	Elena Andreou; 3 of 4 votes Majority	Eleftheria Eleftheriou; 3 of 4 votes Majority	360 Moires; 4 of 4 votes Majority	Pale Faces; 2 of 4 votes Deadlock	Dimitris Maniatis; 3 of 4 votes Majority	Nikiforos; 3 of 4 votes Majority	Hovig Demirjian; 3 of 4 votes Majority	Ivi Adamou; 3 of 5 votes Majority	Polina Christodoulou; 2 of 4 votes Deadlock	Eleni Alexandri; 2 of 4 votes Deadlock	48 Ores; Third Place	Stavros Michalakakos; Winner

1. George's vote counted as two votes and therefore Ivi had 3 votes while Nini had only two.

=== Week 14 (5 February – Semi-Final) ===
- Theme: Mentor's choice
- Celebrity Performers:Professional Sinnerz "Tha rthw na se brw", "Otan Se Eicha Protodei" / Apostolina Mai "Save me"

Contestants' performances on the 13 live show
Act	Order	First song (Contestant's choice)	Order	Second song (Contestant's choice)	Result
Eleni Alexandri	1	"Ignorance"	5	"Den Thelw"	Bottom two
Stavros Michalakakos	2	"Ta karabia mou kaiw"	6	"Impossible"	Safe
Nini Shermadini	3	"To swma pou zhtas"	7	"My All"	Safe
48 Ores	4	"Fly Away"	8	"Stepping Stone"	Bottom two
Final showdown details
Eleni Alexandri	1	"I Don't Want to Miss a Thing"			Eliminated
48 Ores	2	"Stayin' Alive"			Safe

Judges' votes to eliminate

- Katerina Gagaki: 48 Ores
- George Levendis: Eleni Alexandri
- Nikos Mouratidis: Eleni Alexandri
- Giorgos Theofanous: 48 Ores

The result went to deadlock, and Eleni Alexandri was eliminated from the competition.

=== Week 15 (12 February – Final) ===
- Themes: Mentor's choice
- Celebrity performers: Oceana (singer) "Cry Cry", "Lala" / Medina (singer) "You and I (Medina song)"/ Vegas (with the finalists of Next Top Model (Greece)) "hrthe i stigmh" and Sakis Rouvas "+ Se Thelo", "Hamogela", "Irthes", "Spase to Hrono", "Ola Giro Sou Girizoun"

Order	Artist	Mentor	Mentor's Choice	Mentor's Choice	Result
1	48 Ores	George Levendis	"Englishman In New York"	"Wanna Be Starting Something"	Third Place
2	Nini Shermadini	Giorgos Theofanous	"Woman In Love"	"In Assenza Di Te"	Runner-up
3	Stavros Michalakakos	Nikos Mouratidis	"Jenny Don't Be Hasty"	"Sweet Disposition"	Winner

* Even though the November 27 show was supposed to feature the remaining 12 participants, only 10 competitors took part. Two acts, Eleni Alexandri and 360 Moires, did not participate due to H1N1 symptoms. However, the fact that despite their absence they automatically qualified for the next show, coupled with the elimination of a talented participant, sparked controversy.

The presenter, Sakis Rouvas, was obviously shocked and puzzled by Eleftheria's elimination and instantly offered her the opportunity to continue her career with him in his regular performances.

** Eliminated by public vote after the judges forced a tie.
