= Nikki Ponte =

Cypriot-Canadian singer

Nikki Ponte Νίκη Πόντε
- Born: Nikki Ponte; 1 August 1991 (age 34); Toronto, Ontario, Canada
- Origin: Toronto, Ontario
- Genres: Pop, dance, R&B, soul
- Occupation: Singer
- Instruments: Vocals, piano
- Years active: 2010–present
- Labels: Sony Music Greece

Nikki Ponte (Greek: Νίκη Πόντε; born 1 August 1991), is a Cypriot-Canadian singer who rose to fame in Greece and Cyprus through her participation in the third season of Greece's version of the singing competition The X Factor, which she placed third. While still participating in the show, she signed with Sony Music Entertainment Greece and was one of six candidates who were selected to represent Greece in the Eurovision Song Contest 2011. Ponte competed in a national final held in March 2011 with the song "I Don't Wanna Dance", but did not win. The song later entered the 2011 OGAE Second Chance Contest and came 6th out of 21 songs.

== Early life ==
Nikki Ponte was born in Toronto, Ontario, Canada to immigrant parents; her father is Portuguese and her mother is originally from Cyprus. Ponte is fluent in English and proficient in Greek. She attended St. Monica Catholic School for elementary school, and later Saint Mary Catholic Secondary School in Pickering, Ontario. She took opera lessons for ten years and attended Sheridan College's renowned Music Theatre Performance program. Moreover, her uncle was the famous Cypriot actor Sotiris Moustakas.

== The X Factor ==
In 2010, at age 19, Ponte auditioned for Greece's talent show The X Factor at auditions held in New York City. Ponte received approval from the judges and was invited to bootcamp in Athens, Greece, eventually making it through to the live shows. Throughout the competition, she was one of the favorites to win and would spend her free time in her hotel room alone practicing her songs. She ended up placing third.

=== Performances ===
- Week 1: "Teenage Dream" – Katy Perry
- Week 2: "Mamma Mia" – ABBA
- Week 3: "You Lost Me" – Christina Aguilera
- Week 4: "Take It Off" – Kesha
- Week 5: "I Who Have Nothing" – Tom Jones
- Week 6: "Ta Paidia Tou Peiraia" – Melina Mercouri
- Week 7: "Like a Prayer" – Madonna
- Week 8: "Monday Morning" – Melanie Fiona
- Week 9: "Respect" – Aretha Franklin
- Week 10: "Only Girl" – Rihanna / "Empire State of Mind" – Alicia Keys
- Week 11: "All That Jazz" – Musical Chicago / "Telephone" – Lady Gaga ft. Beyoncé
- Week 12: "When You Tell Me That You Love Me" – Diana Ross / "Baby One More Time" – Britney Spears
- Week 13: "Woman in Love" – Barbra Streisand / "Kommati Ap' Tin Kardia Sou" – Despina Vandi
- Week 14: "Bad" – Michael Jackson / "Hurt" – Christina Aguilera

== Post-The X Factor ==
=== 2011–2012: Professional debut ===
After a few months of living in Greece, she was granted citizenship in Republic of Cyprus due to her Cypriot descent. While still in the competition, she caught the attention of Greece's Hellenic Broadcasting Corporation (ERT) and was sequentially approached and signed by Sony Music Entertainment Greece. On 11 January 2011, ERT announced that Ponte was one of six participants in a national final to select Greece's entry in the Eurovision Song Contest 2011. She competed with the song "I Don't Wanna Dance" in the national final held on 2 March 2011, but did not win. The song was released as a digital single in February 2011.

In mid-2011, she was featured on Dimension-X's single "Hey You". She was also featured on the soundtrack of Winx Club 3D: Magical Adventure with the song "Mesa Ston Thavmaton Ton Kosmo", performing the theme song to the film. In November 2011, Ponte released the single "Remembering The Summer Nights".

One year later, after her successful cooperation with Dimension-X, Nikki released "Love's Like Breathing" her new cooperation with the Dutch DJ and producer, DJ San.

=== 2013 – present: New movie ===
On 2 March 2013, Nikki posted on her official Facebook page a photo from the new upcoming movie that she'll be starring in.

== Television ==
Television
Year	Title	Role	Notes
2010–2011	The X- Factor	Herself	Contestant; 3rd place
2011	National Song Selection	Herself	Contestant; 2nd place
2011	Dancing with the Stars	Herself	Guest Star
2011	Mad Video Music Awards (Pre Show)	Herself	Guest Star
2012	Mad Video Music Awards (Pre Show)	Herself	Guest Star
2012	MTV Concert	Herself	Guest Star

== Discography ==
=== Digital singles ===
- 2011: "I Don't Wanna Dance"
- 2011: "Hey You" (Dimension-X Feat. Nikki Ponte)
- 2011: "Mesa Ston Thavmaton Ton Kosmo" (Winx Club 3D: Magical Adventure OST)
- 2011: "Remembering The Summer Nights
- 2012: "Love's Like Breathing" (DJ San Feat. Nikki Ponte)

=== Music videos ===
- 2011: "I Don't Wanna Dance"
- 2011: "Hey You" (Dimension-X Feat. Nikki Ponte)
- 2011: "Remembering The Summer Nights"
- 2012: "Love's Like Breathing" (DJ San Feat. Nikki Ponte)
- 2012: "Dance Diaries with Nikki Ponte" (Dance Clip)

== Filmography ==
- 2017: Rock, Paper, Scissors (R.P.S.)

== Awards and nominations ==
=== Mad Video Music Awards (Greece) ===
Nikki Ponte was nominated for one Mad Video Music Awards in 2012.

Year	Nominee / work	Award	Result
2012	Herself	Best Newcomer Artist	Nominated

=== MTV Europe Music Awards ===
Year	Nominee / work	Award	Result
2012	Remembering The Summer Nights	Best Greek Act	Nominated
