= The X Factor (Greek TV series) =

- Genre: Interactive reality talent show
- Created by: Simon Cowell
- Presented by: Sakis Rouvas; Despina Vandi; Andreas Georgiou; Co-Host; Giorgos Lianos; Despina Kampouri; Maria Sinatsaki; Evangelia Aravani; Aris Makris; Ilias Bogdanos; Katerina Lioliou
- Judges: Giorgos Theofanous; George Levendis; Katerina Gagaki; Nikos Mouratidis; Tamta; Peggy Zina; Thodoris Marantinis; Babis Stokas; Giorgos Papadopoulos; Giorgos Mazonakis†; Melina Aslanidou; Christos Mastoras; Michael Tsaousopoulos; Mariza Rizou; Michalis Kouinelis; Stelios Rokkos; Ilias Psinakis
- Countries of origin: Greece; Cyprus
- Original language: Greek
- No. of series: 7

Production
- Producers: ANT1 (1-3); Skai TV (4-5); Open TV (6); Mega Channel (7)

Original release
- Network: Greece; ANT1 (1-3); Skai TV (4-5); Open TV (6); Mega Channel (7); Cyprus; ANT1 Cyprus (1-3); Sigma TV (4-5); Omega TV (6); Alpha TV Cyprus (7)
- Release: 4 October 2008 – 11 February 2011
- Release: 4 April 2016 – 20 July 2017
- Release: 11 September 2019 – 10 July 2022

The X Factor is the Greek version of The X Factor, a show originating in the United Kingdom. It is a television music talent show contested by aspiring pop singers drawn from public auditions.

Auditions are held in Greece in the cities of Athens and Thessaloniki, as well as in Cyprus in the city of Nicosia. Auditions for the third X Factor were also held in New York City. Applicants from the Greek diaspora are also accepted.

The show was broadcast live in Greece and Cyprus, as well as abroad via ANT1's international stations, for the first three seasons. For the fourth and fifth season was broadcast live in Greece via Skai TV and in Cyprus via Sigma TV. The sixth season was broadcast live in Greece via Open TV and in Cyprus via Omega. The seventh season began airing on 18 March 2022 on Mega Channel and on Alpha TV Cyprus.

The winners of the show are: in the 1st season was Loukas Yorkas, in the 2nd was Stavros Michalakakos, in the 3rd was Harry Antoniou, in the 4th was Andreas Leontas, in the 5th was Panagiotis Koufogiannis, in the 6th was Giannis Grosis and in the 7th was Katerina Lazaridou.

== Stages ==
There are four stages to the competition:

- Stage 1: Judges' auditions – either in an audition room (series 1–3, 5, 7) or an arena (series 4, 6)
- Stage 2: Bootcamp
- Stage 3: Judges Houses (Series 1–3)
- Stage 3: Four-Chair Challenge (Series 4–7)
- Stage 4: Live Shows (Finals)

== Judges and presenters ==
Main Presenters	Sakis Rouvas: 2008–2011, 2016–2017; Despina Vandi: 2019; Andreas Georgiou: 2022
Backstage Presenters	Giorgos Lianos: 2008–2011; Despina Kampouri: 2008–2010; Maria Sinatsaki: 2010–2011; Evangelia Aravani: 2016–2017; Aris Makris: 2019; Ilias Bogdanos: 2022; Katerina Lioliou: 2022
Judges	Giorgos Theofanous: 2008–2011, 2016, 2019; George Levendis: 2008–2011; Katerina Gagaki: 2008–2011; Nikos Mouratidis: 2008–2011 (Note: Mouratidis returned as a guest judge for the 4th and 5th live episodes in 2022.); Tamta: 2016–2017; Peggy Zina: 2016; Thodoris Marantinis: 2016; Babis Stokas: 2017; Giorgos Papadopoulos: 2017; Giorgos Mazonakis†: 2017; Melina Aslanidou: 2019; Christos Mastoras: 2019, 2022; Michael Tsaousopoulos: 2019; Mariza Rizou: 2022; Michalis Kouinelis: 2022; Stelios Rokkos: 2022
Guest Judges	Ilias Psinakis: 2022 (Note: Psinakis served as judge only on the live shows in 2022.); Nikos Mouratidis: 2022

== Series overview ==
To date, seven series have been broadcast, as summarised below.

Contestant in "Nikos Mouratidis"
Contestant in "Katarina Gagaki"
Contestant in "George Levendis"
Contestant in "Giorgos Theofanous"
Contestant in "Tamta"
Contestant in "Peggy Zina"
Contestant in "Thodoris Marantinis"
Contestant in "Babis Stokas"
Contestant in "Giorgos Papadopoulos"
Contestant in "Giorgos Mazonakis†"
Contestant in "Christos Mastoras"
Contestant in "Melina Aslanidou"
Contestant in "Michael Tsaousopoulos"
Contestant in "Mariza Rizou"
Contestant in "Michalis Kouinelis"
Contestant in "Stelios Rokkos"

Series	First aired	Last aired	Winner	Runner-up	Third place	Fourth place	Winning mentor	Presenter	Co-Host	Main judges (Seat order)			
Series	First aired	Last aired	Winner	Runner-up	Third place	Fourth place	Winning mentor	Presenter	Co-Host	1	2	3	4
1	4 October 2008	30 January 2009	Loukas Yorkas; Boys 16-24s	Nikolas Metaxas; Boys 16-24s	Triimitonio; Groups	Kokkina Xalia; Groups	Katerina Gagaki	Sakis Rouvas	Giorgos Lianos; Despina Kampouri	Nikos	Katerina	George	Giorgos T.
2	2 October 2009	12 February 2010	Stavros Michalakakos; Boys 16-24s	Nini Shermadini; Girls 16-24s	48 Ores; Groups	Eleni Alexandri; Over 25s	Nikos Mouratidis	Sakis Rouvas	Giorgos Lianos; Despina Kampouri	Nikos	Katerina	George	Giorgos T.
3	10 October 2010	11 February 2011	Haris Antoniou; Boys 16-24s	Alexandros Notas; Over 25s	Nikki Ponte; Girls 16-24s	T.U. Groups	George Levendis	Sakis Rouvas	Giorgos Lianos; Maria Sinatsaki	Nikos	Katerina	George	Giorgos T.
4	4 April 2016	8 July 2016	Andreas Leontas; Boys 16-24s	Ian Stratis; Boys 16-24s	Stereo Soul; Groups	Tania Breazou; Girls 16-24s	Giorgos Theofanous	Sakis Rouvas	Evangelia Aravani	Thodoris	Tamta	Peggy	Giorgos T.
5	27 April 2017	20 July 2017	Panagiotis Koufogiannis; Over 25s	Soula Evagelou; Girls 16-24s	Dee Vibes; Groups	Vasilis Porfyrakis; Over 25s	Giorgos Mazonakis†	Sakis Rouvas	Evangelia Aravani	Babis	Giorgos P.	Tamta	Giorgos M.†
6	11 September 2019	19 December 2019	Giannis Grosis; Boys 16-24s	Dimitris Papatsakonas; Boys 16-24s	AC²; Groups	Konstantinos Stinis; Over 25s	Christos Mastoras	Despina Vandi	Aris Makris	Michael	Christos	Melina	Giorgos T.
7	18 March 2022	10 July 2022	Katerina Lazaridou	Aggelos Archaniotakis	Elena Panagiotidou	Christos Adamopoulos	Christos Mastoras	Andreas Georgiou	Ilias Bogdanos; Katerina Lioliou	Stelios	Michalis	Christos	Mariza

== Judges' categories and their contestants ==
Key:

– Winning judge/category. Winners are in bold, other contestants in small font.

Series	Nikos Mouratidis	Katerina Gagaki	George Levendis	Giorgos Theofanous
**1**	**Over 25s** Kelly Kaltsi; Konstantinos Tsimouris; Giorgos Klakoumanos; Vasiliki Tsiomi	**Boys 16-24s** **Loukas Yorkas**; Nikolas Metaxas; Louis Georgiou; Christos Kalliatsas	**Girls 16-24s** Ioanna Protopappa; Eirini Papadopoulou; Polyxeni Bifsa; Anthi Simiou	**Groups**; Triimitonio; Kokkina Halia; Juke Box; Crowns
**2**	**Boys 16-24s** **Stavros Michalakakos**; Hovig Demirjian; Nikiforos; Dimitris Maniatis	**Over 25s** Eleni Alexandri; Polina Christodoulou; Elena Andreou; Harikleia Charitsavvidou	**Groups**; 48 Ores; Pale Faces; 360 Moires; X-odos	**Girls 16-24s** Nini Shermadini; Ivi Adamou; Eleftheria Eleftheriou; Giouli Tassou
**3**	**Over 25s** Alexandros Notas; Grigoris Georgiou; Elena Anagiotou; Patrick Guibert	**Girls 16-24s** Nikki Ponte; Maria Katikaridou; Kirki Katsarou; Elena Georgiou	**Boys 16-24**; **Haris Antoniou**; Dimitris Theodorakoglou; Kostantinos Anastasiadis; Alexis Zafeirakis	**Groups**; T.U; The Burning Sticks; Revolt; Tik Tok
4	Thodoris Marantinis	Tamta	Peggy Zina	Giorgos Theofanous
4	**Groups**; Stereo Soul; Aftoi & Afti; N.M.A. Gazoza	**Girls 16-24**; Tania Breazou; Christiana Mpounia; Christina Zanti; Eleni Koskina	**Over 25s** Noena; Alexandros Pitsanis; Pilatos Kounatidis; Giorgos Stefanou	**Boys 16-24**; **Andreas Leontas**; Ian Stratis; Antonis Fokas; Giorgos Papanastasiou
5	Babis Stokas	Giorgos Papadopoulos	Tamta	Giorgos Mazonakis†
5	**Groups**; Dee Vibes; Coda Project; Radiowaves; Human Factory	**Girls 16-24**; Soula Evagelou; Thalia Tsiatini; Marianna Plachoura; Kassiani Dalia	**Boys 16-24**; Konstantinos Notas; Alexandros Sagouris; Savas Savidis; Angelos Provelegiadis	**Over 25s** **Panagiotis Koufogiannis**; Vasilis Porfyrakis; Marianna Georgiadou; Alexandra Matsi
6	Michael Tsaousopoulos	Christos Mastoras	Melina Aslanidou	Giorgos Theofanous
6	**Girls 16-24**; Zoi Misel Bakiri; Konstantina Aresti; Mary Vassiliadou; Viky Mariolou	**Boys 16-24**; **Giannis Grosis**; Dimitris Papatsakonas; Giannis Tergiakis; Giorgos Papanastasiou	**Over 25s** Konstantinos Stinis; Lila Trianti; Giannis Antzouris; Nektarios Rigas	**Groups**; AC²; Ano Kato; Liak and the Cover; DAF
7	Stelios Rokkos	Michalis Kouinelis	Christos Mastoras	Mariza Rizou
7	Elena Panagiotidou; Thanos Lambrou; JCJO; Decho	Giname; Giannis Onisiforou; Miltos Charovas; Ioli Pedara	**Katerina Lazaridou**; Konstantinos Ntasios; Borek; Aristea Alexandraki	Aggelos Archaniotakis; Christos Adamopoulos; Evelina Katsiakou; Case Zero

== Series overview ==
=== Series 1 (2008–2009) ===
The first series of the Greek X Factor started airing in October 2008 on ANT1 and was hosted by singer Sakis Rouvas. The judges were Giorgos Levendis, songwriter Giorgos Theofanous, marketing executive of ANT1 TV, Katerina Gagaki and music critic Nikos Mouratidis.

The winner of the 1st X-Factor was Loukas Yorkas from Cyprus who released his debut EP album in September 2009.

=== Series 2 (2009–2010) ===
A second series of X Factor was broadcasteby ANT1 TV. The live shows debuted on October 30. The host and the judges remain the same as in the first series. The winner of the 2nd X-Factor was Stavros Michalakakos from Cyprus.

=== Series 3 (2010–2011) ===
A third season of X Factor was broadcast from October 2010 to February 2011. The third series of X Factor was won by Haris Antoniou from Cyprus. The program was broadcast by ANT1 TV and the host and the judges remained the same as the previous year.

=== Series 4 (2016) ===
A fourth season of X Factor was broadcast from 4 April to 8 July 2016 on Skai TV. The host Sakis Rouvas remained with Evaggelia Aravani in backstage. Giorgos Theofanous remained from the judges of the past seasons with Peggy Zina, Tamta and Thodoris Marantinis from Onirama being the new judges. The winner of this series was Andreas Leontas from Cyprus.

=== Series 5 (2017) ===
A fifth season of X Factor was broadcast from April 27 to July 20, 2017 on Skai TV. The host Sakis Rouvas remained with Evaggelia Aravani in backstage. Tamta remained from the judges of the past seasons with Giorgos Mazonakis, Giorgos Papadopoulos and Babis Stokas being the new judges. The winner of this series was Panagiotis Koufogiannis from Cyprus.

=== Series 6 (2019) ===
A sixth season of X Factor began broadcast from 11 September 2019 on Open TV. The judges are Giorgos Theofanous, who returned for his fifth series as judge, former The Voice of Greece coach Melina Aslanidou, former Rising Star judge Christos Mastoras and Athens DeeJay Michael Tsaousopoulos. Despina Vandi will be the host, replacing Sakis Rouvas. Aris Makris is presenting the Backstage of Live Shows, replacing Evaggelia Aravani. This was the first edition in which a contenstant from Greece managed to win as in all previous editions the winner was a singer coming from Cyprus.

=== Series 7 (2022) ===
A seventh season of The X Factor began broadcast from 18 March 2022 on Mega Channel. Christos Mastoras, returned for his second season as judge, and with the three new judges, Mariza Rizou, Stelios Rokkos and Michalis Kouinelis. Andreas Georgiou hosted the live shows. Ilias Bogdanos and Katerina Lioliou were presenting the backstage of Live Shows.

== See also ==
- Greek Idol
- The Voice of Greece
