= The X Factor (Greek TV series) series 1 =

Greek music talent show

The X Factor
- Series 1
- Hosted by: Sakis Rouvas (live shows); Giorgos Lianos (audition shows); Despina Kampouri (audition shows)
- Judges: George Levendis; Giorgos Theofanous; Katerina Gagaki; Nikos Mouratidis
- Winner: Loukas Giorkas
- Runner-up: Nikolas Metaxas

Release
- Original network: ANT1
- Original release: 4 October 2008 – 30 January 2009

Series chronology
- Next → Series 2

The first season of the Greek music talent show The X Factor began airing on ANT1 on 4 October 2008 and concluded on 30 January 2009. The show was presented by Sakis Rouvas. It was also broadcast abroad via ANT1's international stations.

The first series was won by Loukas Giorkas, who went on to represent Greece in the 2011 Eurovision Song Contest.

== Selection process ==
=== Auditions ===
Public auditions by aspiring pop singers began in July 2008 and concluded in September 2008. The auditions were held in three cities: in Athens and Thessaloniki (Greece) and Larnaka (Cyprus).

=== Bootcamp ===
Following initial auditions, the "Boot camp" stage took place in September 2008. Approximately 200 acts attended Boot Camp. They were initially split into groups of three, and judges gave instant decisions on who would leave based on the group performances, bringing the number of acts down to 150. The judges then cut the number of acts down to 80. They were split into four categories: Boys, Girls, Over 25s and Groups, before the judges discovered which category they would mentor for the rest of the competition. The Boys (16–24) were mentored by Katerina Gagaki, George Levendis had the Girls (16–24), Nikos Mouratidis mentored the Over 25s, and Giorgos Theofanous took charge of the Groups. At the last stage of boot camp only 32 remained.

=== Judges Houses ===
During "Judges' Houses", the judges welcomed the eight acts from their selected category to their "homes". Each act had only one chance to impress their mentor who had the task of selecting which three acts were to go through to the live shows and which three would be eliminated.

The sixteen eliminated acts were:

- Boys 16-24 – Mixalis Zeis, Vasilis Pachis, Maurikios Maurikiou, Akis Panagiotidis
- Girls 16-24 – Eugenia Mpalafa, Eua Tsachra, Ifigenia Stefanou, Basiliki Papada
- Over 25s –
- Groups –

== Contestants and categories ==
The final 16 acts were confirmed as follows:

Key:

– Winner
– Runner-up
– Third Place

Category (mentor)	Acts			
Girls 16-24 (George Levendis)	Ioanna Protopappa	Eirini Papadopoulou	Anthi Simiou	Polyxeni Bifsa
Boys 16-24 (Katerina Gagaki)	Louis Georgiou	Nikolas Metaxas (United States)	Loukas Giorkas	Christos Kalliatsas
Over 25s (Nikos Mouratidis)	Kelly Kaltsi	Giorgos Klakoumanos	Vasiliki Tsiomi	Konstantinos Tsimouris
Groups (Giorgos Theofanous)	Kokkina Xalia	Crowns	Juke Box	Triimitonio

== Live shows ==
The live shows started on 23 October 2009. The acts are performing every Friday night with the results announced on the same day.

=== Results summary ===
Colour key

–	Contestant was in the bottom two/three and had to sing again in the final showdown

Table showing weekly results, indicating which contestants were eliminated or safe, how each judge voted, and positions in each week's public vote where known.
	Week 1	Week 2	Week 3	Week 4	Week 5	Week 6	Week 7	Week 8	Week 9	Week 10	Week 11	Week 12	Week 13	
Loukas Giorkas	Safe	Safe	Safe	Safe	Safe	Safe	Safe	Safe	Safe	Safe	Safe	Safe	Winner	
Nikolas Metaxas	Safe	Safe	Safe	Safe	Safe	Safe	Safe	Safe	Safe	Safe	Safe	Safe	Runner-Up	
Triimitonio	Safe	Safe	Safe	Safe	Safe	Safe	Safe	Safe	Safe	Safe	Safe	Bottom 2	3rd	
Kokkina Xalia	Safe	Safe	Safe	Safe	Safe	Safe	Bottom 2	Safe	Safe	Safe	5th	Safe	4th	
Ioanna Protopappa	Safe	Safe	Safe	Safe	Bottom 2	Safe	Safe	Safe	Safe	Safe	Safe	Bottom 2	Eliminated (week 12)	
Kelly Kaltsi	Safe	Safe	Safe	Safe	Safe	Safe	Safe	Bottom 2	Bottom 2	Bottom 2	6th	Eliminated (week 11)		
Konstantinos Tsimouris	Safe	Safe	Safe	Bottom 2	Safe	10th	Safe	Safe	Safe	Bottom 2	Eliminated (week 10)			
Louis Giorgiou	Safe	Safe	Safe	Safe	Safe	Safe	Safe	Safe	Bottom 2	Eliminated (week 9)				
Christos Kalliatsas	Safe	Safe	Safe	Safe	Safe	Safe	Safe	Bottom 2	Eliminated (week 8)					
Giorgos Klakoumanos	Safe	Safe	Safe	Safe	Safe	Safe	Bottom 2	Eliminated (week 7)						
Eirini Papadopoulou	Bottom 2	Safe	Safe	Safe	Safe	11th	Eliminated (week 6)							
Juke Box	Safe	Safe	Safe	Safe	Bottom 2	Eliminated (week 5)								
Polyxeni Bifsa	Safe	Bottom 2	Bottom 2	Bottom 2	Eliminated (week 4)									
Anthi Simiou	Safe	Safe	Bottom 2	Eliminated (week 3)										
Crowns	Safe	Bottom 2	Eliminated (week 2)											
Vasiliki Tsiomi	Bottom 2	Eliminated (week 1)												
Final showdown	Eirini Papadopoulou, Vasiliki Tsiomi	Crowns, Polyxeni Bifsa	Anthi Simiou, Polyxeni Bifsa	Konstantinos Tsimouris, Polyxeni Bifsa	Ioanna Protopappa, Juke Box	Eirini Papadopoulou, Konstantinos Tsimouris	Giorgos Klakoumanos, Kokkina Xalia	Christos Kalliatsas, Kelly Kaltsi	Kelly Kaltsi, Louis Georgiou	Kelly Kaltsi, Konstantinos Tsimouris	Kelly Kaltsi, Kokkina Xalia	Ioanna Protopappa, Triimitonio	No final showdown or judges' vote: results are based on public votes alone	
Mouratidis's vote to eliminate	Eirini Papadopoulou	Crowns		Polyxeni Bifsa	Juke Box		Kokkina Xalia	Christos Kalliatsas	Louis Georgiou	Kelly Kaltsi	Kokkina Xalia	Ioanna Protopappa	No final showdown or judges' vote: results are based on public votes alone	
Gagaki's vote to eliminate	Vasiliki Tsiomi	Crowns		Polyxeni Bifsa	Juke Box		Giorgos Klakoumanos	Kelly Kaltsi	Kelly Kaltsi	Konstantinos Tsimouris	Kokkina Xalia	Ioanna Protopappa	No final showdown or judges' vote: results are based on public votes alone	
Levendis's vote to eliminate	Vasiliki Tsiomi	Crowns		Konstantinos Tsimouris	Juke Box		Giorgos Klakoumanos	Christos Kalliatsas	Louis Georgiou	Konstantinos Tsimouris	Kelly Kaltsi	Triimitonio	No final showdown or judges' vote: results are based on public votes alone	
Theofamous's vote to eliminate	Vasiliki Tsiomi	Polyxeni Bifsa		Polyxeni Bifsa	Juke Box		Giorgos Klakoumanos	Christos Kalliatsas	Louis Georgiou	Konstantinos Tsimouris	Kelly Kaltsi	Ioanna Protopappa	No final showdown or judges' vote: results are based on public votes alone	
Eliminated	Vasiliki Tsiomi; 3 of 4 votes Majority	Crowns; 3 of 4 votes Majority	Anthi Simiou ? of 4 votes	Polyxeni Bifsa; 3 of 4 votes Majority	Juke Box; 4 of 4 votes Majority	Eirini Papadopoulou; 2 of 4 votes Deadlock	Giorgos Klakoumanos; 3 of 4 votes Majority	Christos Kalliatsas; 3 of 4 votes Majority	Louis Georgiou; 3 of 4 votes Majority	Konstantinos Tsimouris ? of 4 votes Majority	Kelly Kaltsi; 2 of 4 votes Deadlock	Ioanna Protopappa; 3 of 4 votes Majority	Triimitonio; Third Place	Loukas Giorkas; Winner
Eliminated	Vasiliki Tsiomi; 3 of 4 votes Majority	Crowns; 3 of 4 votes Majority	Anthi Simiou ? of 4 votes	Polyxeni Bifsa; 3 of 4 votes Majority	Juke Box; 4 of 4 votes Majority	Eirini Papadopoulou; 2 of 4 votes Deadlock	Giorgos Klakoumanos; 3 of 4 votes Majority	Christos Kalliatsas; 3 of 4 votes Majority	Louis Georgiou; 3 of 4 votes Majority	Konstantinos Tsimouris ? of 4 votes Majority	Kelly Kaltsi; 2 of 4 votes Deadlock	Ioanna Protopappa; 3 of 4 votes Majority	Kokkina Xalia; Fourth Place	Nikolas Metaxas; Runner-Up

=== Week 12 (23 January Semi-Final) ===
- Themes: Mentor's choice and free choice
- Celebrity performers: Tamta "Koita me", "Agapise me" / Korgialas and Evridiki "Mia fora", "xwris esena", "geia sou", "Comme Ci, Comme Ça"

Contestants' performances on the twelfth live show
Act	Order	First song (Mentor's choice)	Order	Second song (Contestant's choice)	Result
Triimitonio	1	"Dust in the wind"	6	"Karagiozis"	Bottom two
Nikolas Metaxas	2	"O proskinitis"	7	"Bring me to life"	Safe
Loukas Giorkas	3	"Agriolouloudo"	8	"Didimotixo Blues"	Safe
Kokkina Xalia	4	"O basilias tis skonis"	9	"I'll Be There for You"	Safe
Ioanna Protopappa	5	"Giati Fobase"	10	"Hot n Cold"	Bottom two
Final showdown details
Triimitonio	1	"Anoites Agapes & Trenaki"			Safe
Ioanna Protopappa	2	"Un-Break My Heart"			Eliminated

Judges' votes to eliminate

- Giorgos Theofanous: Ioanna Protopappa
- George Levendis: Triimitonio
- Katerina Gagaki: Ioanna Protopappa
- Nikos Mouratidis: Ioanna Protopappa

=== Week 13 (30 January Final) ===
- Themes: Mentor's choice, Free choice and Final choice
- Celebrity performers: Natasha Theodoridou "Fegari", "Dipla Se Sena", "Apantise mou", "Oneiro"

Order	Artist	Mentor	Contestant's Choice	Mentor's Choice	Contestant's Favourite	Result
1	Kokkina Xalia	Giorgos Theofanous	Hartaetos	unknown	unknown	Fourth Place
2	Loukas Giorkas	Katerina Gagaki	"Ladadika"	"Piretos"	"Party"	Winner
3	Nikolas Metaxas	Katerina Gagaki	"Dream on"	"Anthropoi Monahoi"	"Let me entertain you"	Runner Up
4	Triimitonio	Giorgos Theofanous	unknown	unknown	unknown	Third Place

* Eliminated by public vote, after the judges forced a tie.
