= Radio Proto =

Radio station in Cyprus

Radio Proto Ράδιο Πρώτο
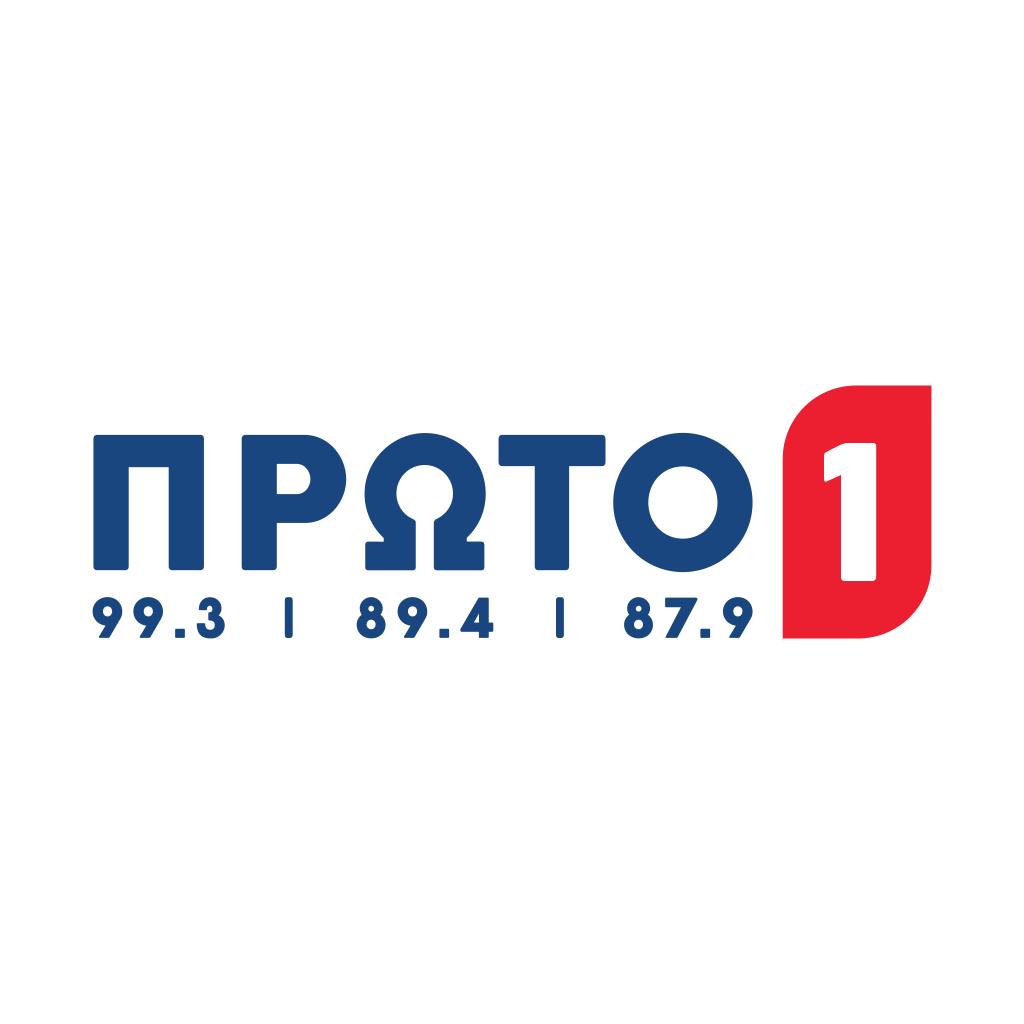
- Nicosia; Cyprus
- Frequencies: 99.3 MHz (National); 89.4 MHz (Larnaca and Paphos); 87.9 MHz (Limassol and Famagusta)

Programming
- Language: Greek
- Format: News and Music

Ownership
- Owner: Dias Publishing House Ltd.

History
- First air date: September 3, 1990

Technical information
- ERP: 40 dBW (National Coverage); 30 dBW (Paphos/Limassol); 37 dBW (Larnaca); 23 dBW (Famagusta)

Links
- Webcast: Radio Proto
- Website: Official Website

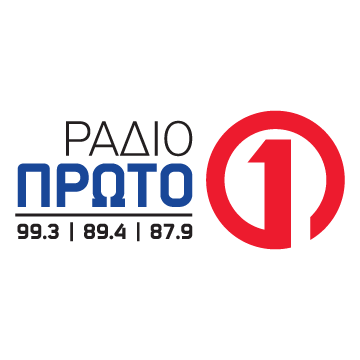
Old logo (2018–2021)

Radio Proto (Greek: Ράδιο Πρώτο) is a privately owned radio broadcasting station in Cyprus. It was launched on September 3, 1990 in the capital Nicosia, but now has island-wide coverage. It belongs to the DIAS Group.

== History ==
The radio station which is based in Strovolos went on the air on 3 September 1990. Radio Proto transmits on three FM frequencies 99.3 (national coverage), 89.4 (for Paphos, and Larnaca) and 87.9 (for Limassol and Famagusta).

The first successful morning program was presented by Giorgos Gravaris every day from 06:00 to 09:00. Also noteworthy are the presenters and producers, that were with the station from the start, including Stella Sourmeli, Roula Georgiadou, John Vickers, Zacharias Philippides, Stavros Sideras, Yianna Loizidou, Yiannis Adilinis, Dimitris Kallergis, Lazaros Mavros and Maria Sfetsou whose jointly-presented program, was extremely successful.

== Presenters & Producers ==
- Giota Damianou
- Andreas Dimitropoulos
- Memnon Sotirellis
- Froso Violari
- Lazaros Mavros
- Nikolas Ioannidis
- Panagiotis Kyriacou
- Marios Poullados
- Petros Athanasiou
- Themis Constantinou
- Anna Priga
- Cosmas Develegas
- Giorgos Karampatakis
- Charis Kkolos
- Dena Kyriakidi
