= George Levendis =

- Born
- Origin: Australian (Greek heritage)
- Occupations: Television General Manager, Television Executive, Television Producer, Television CMO, Music Executive
- Labels: Syco Entertainment, SonyBMG Entertainment (Columbia, Epic, RCA, Arista, J Records), Arista UK, Arista Records US, Bad Boy Records, LaFace Records, Heaven Music
- Website: https://georgelevendis.com

George Levendis is a Global Television and Music Executive and is currently Managing Director of Antenna TV, MAK TV and Antenna Studios for the ANT1 Group, having been promoted from CMO. In this capacity, he plays a pivotal role in leading all operations of the television stations and the ANT1 Studios, overseeing the P&L's and offering strategic guidance to empower creative and commercial growth.

Prior to this, he was the Executive Producer and show-runner of Red Bull's The Cut. In 2018 he took on the role of COO of Acun Medya Global, focusing on the production and expansion of TV formats internationally. From 2011 to 2018 he was Head of International for Syco TV, a joint venture between Simon Cowell and Sony Music Entertainment. In this role he was responsible for the international expansion of The X Factor and Got Talent and other Syco TV franchises. During his tenure at Syco, Got Talent and The X Factor grew rapidly internationally. Got Talent was produced in over 70 markets and The X Factor was sold to over 56 markets globally.

Over the last 20 years, Levendis has held senior management and international marketing positions at a number of record companies, including Arista Records, Arista Records U.K., BMG Greece, BMG Australia, Heaven Music, and culminating as Senior Vice President of Sony BMG Global Marketing at the headquarters of Sony BMG in New York City. In this position, he oversaw worldwide campaigns for artists including Beyoncé, Justin Timberlake, Pink, Shakira, Foo Fighters, Kings of Leon, Leona Lewis, Il Divo and Westlife.

== Background ==
George attended Sydney Boys High School and then pursued a Bachelor of Arts degree in Psychology at the University of New South Wales and graduated with a Master of Commerce in Marketing. He also attained a Master of Arts in Media Management from Macquarie University's Graduate School of Management.

Levendis started his career in music marketing at BMG Australia, and worked across all marketing and artist development divisions culminating in becoming General Manager of Marketing.

Levendis left BMG Australia for Arista Records U.K., where he served as Marketing Director. He was then promoted to Managing Director of BMG Greece, and soon afterwards was moved to Arista Records in New York where he served as Vice President of International Worldwide Marketing under Clive Davis, eventually being promoted to Senior Vice President of Marketing under Antonio "LA" Reid. While at Arista, Levendis helped capitalize on artists' global presence, overseeing the international marketing campaigns for Carlos Santana's Supernatural, Whitney Houston's My Love is Your Love and Whitney: The Greatest Hits, TLC's FanMail, and Pink's Can't Take Me Home among others.

Levendis was then hired as Managing Director, with the launching of the Greek independent label Heaven Music, owned by ANT1 Group, which he helped build into one of Greece's most successful independent music companies.

He returned to New York and Sony BMG's global headquarters to serve as Senior Vice President of Sony BMG Global Marketing Group, working across keys markets to develop and promote worldwide campaigns for Sony's global priority artists including, Beyonce, Bob Dylan, Justin Timberlake, Shakira, Pink and Bruce Springsteen.

Levendis returned to ANT1 television as General Manager repositioning the broadcaster as the most contemporary station in the region. The rebranding strategy, including a new logo, complete station makeover and a new AVOD strategy catapulted Antenna into a new era. High rating shows included Got Talent, Next Top Model, Dancing with the Stars, The X Factor and the Morning Show 10 to 1. Antenna also entered the sports domain broadcasting Formula One, Greek A1 Basket League and the UEFA Europa League for three consecutive years. Over this time Levendis served as a judge on Greece's The X Factor.

In 2011, he joined Simon Cowell as Head of International Syco TV, overseeing Syco's international business, as detailed above.

== Personal life ==
Levendis met his wife Maria Mentis-Levendis in Australia. They have 3 children, twins, born in Manhattan, NYC and a son born in Athens. Maria was on the board of directors of the Make a Wish Foundation in Greece and played an integral part in the marketing and public relations of the charity. Make A Wish is the selected charity for Greece's high rating show Dancing with the Stars. Maria continues to be an active supporter of the charity in the United Kingdom where the family resides.

== See also ==
- Heaven Music
