= George Theofanous =

Greek Cypriot composer and producer (born 1996)

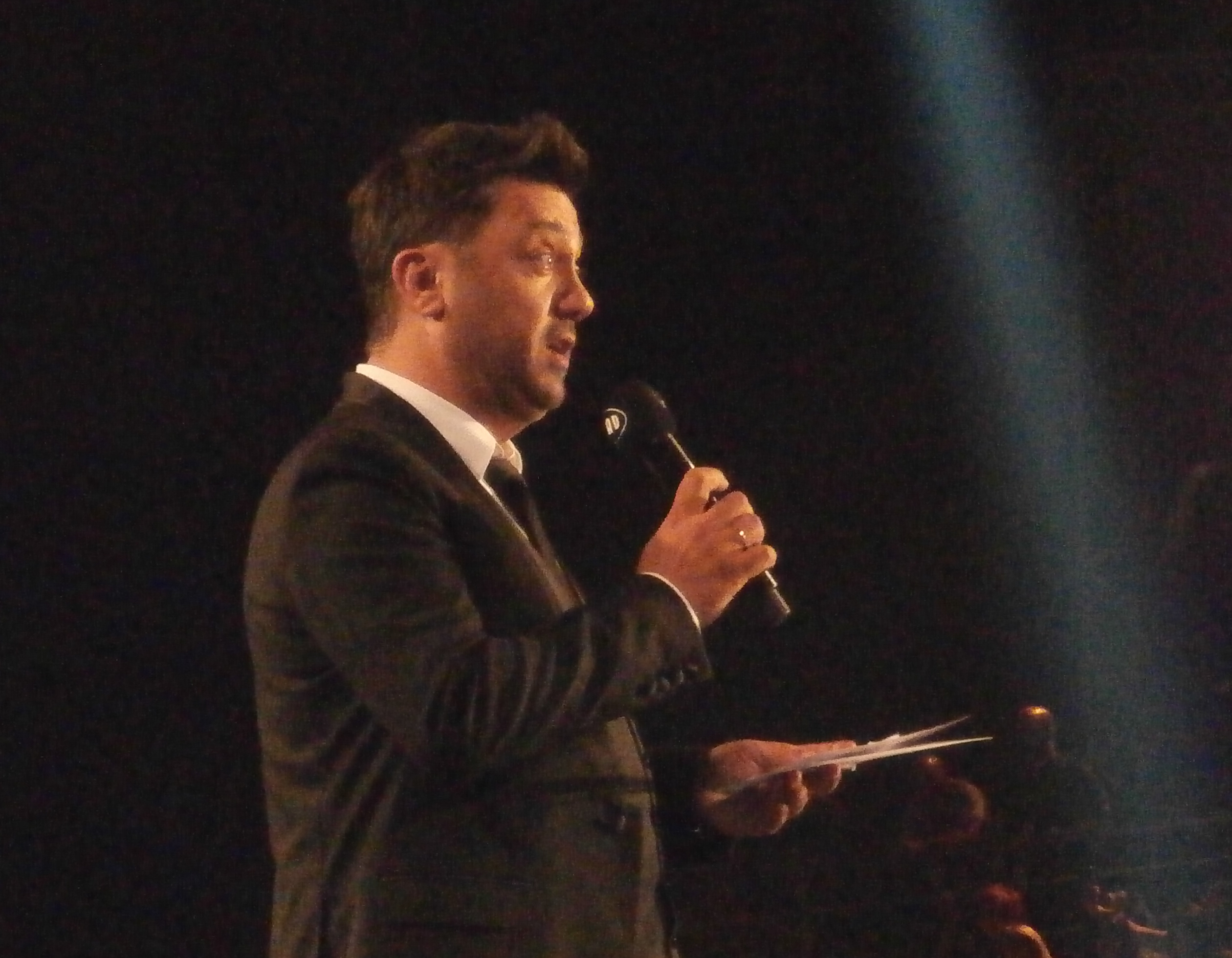
- Giorgos Theofanous at MAD Video Music Awards 2017

Background information
- Born: 9 January 1968; Larnaca, Cyprus
- Occupations: Singer; Composer
- Years active: 1989–present
- Label: Panik Records
- Partner: Evridiki (1992–2001)

George Theofanous (Greek: Γιώργος Θεοφάνους, pronounced [ˈʝorɣos θeoˈfanus]; born 9 January 1968) is a Greek Cypriot composer and producer. He has sold more than two million records and written more than 500 songs in the 1990s and 2000s. Recording artists for whom he has written and produced for include Nana Mouskouri, George Dalaras. His work has received a total of nine Arion Awards, which was an award show by IFPI Greece. He served as a judge for six seasons of the Greek edition of The X Factor from 2008 to 2011 and in the 2016 and 2019 seasons.

He studied guitar, piano, and music theory at the national conservatory of Greece. He continued his studies at Berklee College of Music in Boston, USA, majoring in arrangement. He has received several awards as a songwriter/producer both in Greece and Cyprus. In 1990 he settled in Athens where he began his career in the Greek music industry. In April 1993, he married Greek Cypriot singer Evridiki with whom he has collaborated extensively. Together they have one son, Aggelos, who was born in 1996. The couple divorced in 2001.

In 1999, Theofanous put together boy band ONE who became very popular in Greece and Cyprus, reaching platinum sales.

== Involvement in the Eurovision Song Contest ==
George Theofanous has composed three Cyprus entries, debuting in 1992 with singer Evridiki and the song "Teriazoume" which placed eleventh. He and Evridiki were reselected in 1994 with the song "Eimai Anthropos Ki Ego" and finished once again at eleventh place. Finally, CyBC selected Theofanous and his boy band ONE for the 2002 with the song "Gimme" which finished at sixth place. He conducted the Eurovision orchestra for four consecutive Cypriot entries, from 1992 to 1995.

== Selected discography ==
- Tragoudo To Nisi Mou (2014)
- Choës, poetry: Claire Angelides 2015
