= Just the 2 of Us (Greek TV series) season 3 =

Just the 2 of Us
- Season 3
- Hosted by: Nikos Koklonis; Vicky Kavoura (Backstage)
- Judges: Despina Vandi; Maria Bakodimou; Stamatis Fasoulis; Vicky Stavropoulou
- Celebrity winner: Tasos Xiarchos
- Professional winner: Connie Metaxa
- No. of episodes: 12

Release
- Original network: Open TV
- Original release: March 14 – July 11, 2020

Season chronology
- Next → Season 4

The third season of the Greek reality show Just the 2 of Us began airing on March 14, 2020 for the first time from Open TV.

The main host for season three was Nikos Koklonis and the backstage host was Vicky Kavoura. Despina Vandi, Maria Bakodimou, Stamatis Fasoulis and Vicky Stavropoulou were in the judging panel.

It was revealed that season three would have 14 contestants, the biggest number of participants so far.

Due to the COVID-19 pandemic in Greece, all shows aired without the audience in the studio to respects the governmental procedures imposed. On March 17, 2020, the channel Open TV announced that the production would be interrupted due to the COVID-19 pandemic in Greece. On April 29, 2020, Open TV announced that the show will return on May 2, 2020. The show returned again without audience in the studio. The contestants stayed in the chairs, where the audience sit. Among the judges was a mosque.

The show until the 10th episode was filmed 4 days before the episodes were aired on television, but the semifinal and the final were broadcast Live.

On July 11, 2020, Tasos Xiarchos and Connie Metaxa were declared the winners. Vicky Hadjivassiliou and Costas Karafotis came in second place, with Trifonas Samaras and Chara Verra came in third place.

== Format ==
Fourteen professional singers and fourteen personalities from various venues who have the courage to sing on stage join their voices in a charity music show.

Each week, the duets will fill the stage of Just the 2 of Us with unique performances.

The jury will evaluate the contestants' duets each week and they will also vote for them, from 1 to 10.

Viewers will get 5 votes through the OPEN app and for three days after each show they will be able to vote for their favorite duo for free. Based on this vote, the most popular duo will secure immunity in the next episode. The couple with the fewest judges votes and viewers votes will be eliminated from the show.

The 28 contestants will be tested in a rich and unpredictable Greek and foreign repertoire to highlight the winner.

== Judges ==
- Despina Vandi, singer, actress.
- Maria Bakodimou, television presenter.
- Stamatis Fasoulis, actor.
- Vicky Stavropoulou, actress.

== Couples ==
Celebrity	Occupation	Professional singer	Status
Christina Pappa	Actress	Constantinos Frantzis	Eliminated 1st on May 2, 2020
Nicoletta Carra	Actress	Valandis	Eliminated 2nd on May 9, 2020
Ioannis Drymonakos	Olympic Swimming	Chrispa	Eliminated 3rd on May 16, 2020
Christina Vrachali	Journalist	George Lebanis	Eliminated 4th on May 23, 2020
George Giannopoulos	Actor	Despina Olympiou	Eliminated 5th on May 30, 2020
Leonidas Kalfagiannis	Actor	Crystallia	Eliminated 6th on June 6, 2020
Orpheus Papadopoulos	Actor	Artemis Mataphia	Eliminated 7th on June 13, 2020
Konstantina Spyropoulou	Television Presenter	Christos Zotos	Eliminated 8th on June 20, 2020
Marios Priamos Ioannidis	Television Presenter	Aspa Tsina (weeks 1-5); George Lebanis (weeks 6-10)	Eliminated 9th on June 27, 2020
Eteoklis Paylou	Champion Canoe Kayak	Eleni Hatzidou	Eliminated 10th on July 4, 2020
Errika Prezerakou	Pole vaulter	Aris Makris	Eliminated 10th on July 4, 2020
Trifonas Samaras	Hair Stylist	Chara Verra	Third Place on July 11, 2020
Vicky Hadjivassiliou	Television Presenter, Journalist	Costas Karafotis	Runner up on July 11, 2020
Tasos Xiarchos	Choreographer	Connie Metaxa	Winner on July 11, 2020

== Scoring chart ==
Couple	Place	Week											
Couple	Place	1	2	3	4	5	6	7	8	9	10	11	12
Tasos & Connie	1	32	32	36	37	38	40	36	40	40	40+40=80	40+40=80	40+40+40=120
Vicky & Costas	2	26	31	32	31	30	35	38	39	39	35+32=67	36+32=68	36+40+36=112
Trifonas & Chara	3	24	23	28	28	32	24	27	24	24	25+30=55	28+26=54	32+32+29=93
Eteoklis & Eleni	4	27	29	27	25	25	32	37	36	30	35+36=71	34+32=66	
Errika & Aris	4	35	36	35	33	35	37	37	37	34	40+40=80	36+40=76	
Marios & Aspa/George	6	22	31	29	31	29	32	36	38	31	32+36=68		
Konstantina & Christos	7	20	24	24	22	24	32	28	32	28			
Orpheus & Artemis	8	27	28	33	33	35	37	35	33				
Leonidas & Crystallia	9	26	25	31	32	32	30	32					
George & Despina	10	30	29	32	28	38	32						
Christina & George	11	26	24	28	28	27							
Ioannis & Chrispa	12	27	26	27	27								
Nicoletta & Valandis	13	27	26	28									
Christina & Constantinos	14	24	28										

Red numbers indicate the lowest score for each week
Green numbers indicate the highest score for each week
the couple eliminated that week
the returning couple finishing in the bottom two/three
indicates the couple which was immune from elimination
the winning couple
the runner-up couple
the third-place couple

=== Average score chart ===
This table only counts for performances scored on a traditional 40-points scale.

Rank by average	Place	Couple	Total points	Number of performances	Average
1	1	Tasos & Connie	611	16	38.2
2	4	Errika & Aris	475	13	36.5
3	2	Vicky & Costas	548	16	34.2
4	8	Orpheus & Artemis	261	8	32.6
5	10	George & Despina	189	6	31.5
5	6	Marios & Aspa/George	347	11	31.5
7	4	Eteoklis & Eleni	405	13	31.2
8	9	Leonidas & Crystallia	208	7	29.7
9	3	Trifonas & Chara	436	16	27.2
10	13	Nicoletta & Valandis	81	3	27.0
11	12	Ioannis & Chrispa	107	4	26.8
12	11	Christina & George	133	5	26.6
13	7	Konstantina & Christos	234	9	26.0
13	14	Christina & Constantinos	52	2	26.0

== Weekly scores ==
=== Week 1 ===
The premiere aired on March 14, 2020. Errika & Aris had the highest combined score from judges and they got immunity and for next week.

Order	Couple	Song	Judge's Scores				Total
Order	Couple	Song	Vicky	Stamatis	Despina	Maria	Total
1	Leonidas & Crystallia	"Sou Milo kai Kokkinizeis"	7	8	6	5	26
2	Christina & George	"Valto Terma"	7	7	6	6	26
3	Orpheus & Artemis	"Dusk Till Dawn"	8	6	7	6	27
4	Eteoklis & Eleni	"O Horos"	7	7	7	6	27
5	Errika & Aris	"Nothing Breaks Like a Heart"	9	9	9	8	35
6	Vicky & Costas	"Petao"	7	6	6	7	26
7	Marios & Aspa	"Senorita"	6	6	5	5	22
8	Ioannis & Chrispa	"Ipirhes Panta"	7	6	7	7	27
9	Christina & Constantinos	"Loquita"	6	6	6	6	24
10	Tasos & Connie	"Californication"	8	8	8	8	32
11	Trifonas & Chara	"Ela Ela"	6	6	6	6	24
12	Nicoletta & Valandis	"I Epimoni sou"	7	7	7	6	27
13	Konstantina & Christos	"Ftino Xenodoheio"	5	5	5	5	20
14	George & Despina	"Dilitirio"	8	8	7	7	30

=== Week 2 ===
Errika & Aris had immunity from the previous episode.

Order	Couple	Song	Judge's Scores				Total	Result
Order	Couple	Song	Vicky	Stamatis	Despina	Maria	Total	Result
1	Ioannis & Chrispa	"Mazi Sou"	7	7	6	6	26	Safe
2	George & Despina	"Ena Lepto"	7	7	7	8	29	Safe
3	Christina & Constantinos	"Eisai Paidi mou Pirasmos"	7	7	7	7	28	Eliminated
4	Nicoletta & Valandis	"Skoni kai Thripsala"	7	6	6	7	26	Safe
5	Konstantina & Christos	"Ela mou"	6	6	6	6	24	Bottom two
6	Christina & George	"To S' Agapo"	6	6	6	6	24	Safe
7	Tasos & Connie	"Sandra"	8	8	8	8	32	Safe
8	Orpheus & Artemis	"An mou Tilefonouses"/"Dodeka"	7	8	6	7	28	Safe
9	Eteoklis & Eleni	"Sti Ntiskotek"	8	8	7	6	29	Safe
10	Leonidas & Crystallia	"Believer"	7	6	6	6	25	Safe
11	Vicky & Costas	"Kapou S'exo Xanadei"	8	8	8	7	31	Safe
12	Marios & Aspa	"San Dio Stagones Vrohis"	8	8	8	7	31	Safe
13	Trifonas & Chara	"To Mantili"	6	6	5	6	23	Safe
14	Errika & Aris	"You Give Love a Bad Name"	9	9	9	9	36	Immunity

=== Week 3 ===
Order	Couple	Song	Judge's Scores				Total	Result
Order	Couple	Song	Vicky	Stamatis	Despina	Maria	Total	Result
1	Nicoletta & Valandis	"Let's Get Loud"	7	7	7	7	28	Eliminated
2	Leonidas & Crystallia	"San Na Min Perase Mia Mera"	8	8	8	7	31	Safe
3	Tasos & Connie	"Blue Jeans"	9	9	9	9	36	Safe
4	Eteoklis & Eleni	"Glyka Glyka"	7	6	7	7	27	Safe
5	Orpheus & Artemis	"One"	8	8	9	8	33	Safe
6	Errika & Aris	"Feggari Mou"	9	9	8	9	35	Safe
7	Ioannis & Chrispa	"Fly Away"	7	7	6	7	27	Bottom two
8	George & Despina	"De Horas Poythena"	8	8	8	8	32	Safe
9	Christina & George	"Oneiro Apatilo"	7	6	7	8	28	Safe
10	Marios & Aspa	"OK"	7	7	8	7	29	Safe
11	Trifonas & Chara	"Einai Fasi to Agori"	7	7	7	7	28	Safe
12	Vicky & Costas	"Na Me Proseheis"	8	8	8	8	32	Safe
13	Konstantina & Christos	"Señorita"	6	6	6	6	24	Safe

=== Week 4 ===
Order	Couple	Song	Judge's Scores				Total	Result
Order	Couple	Song	Vicky	Stamatis	Despina	Maria	Total	Result
1	Orpheus & Artemis	"(I've Had) The Time of My Life"	8	8	9	8	33	Bottom two
2	George & Despina	"Dianyktereyo"	7	7	7	7	28	Safe
3	Errika & Aris	"I Want Your Sex"	9	8	8	8	33	Safe
4	Konstantina & Christos	"Kivotos"	6	6	5	5	22	Safe
5	Marios & Aspa	"Left Outside Alone"	8	8	8	7	31	Safe
6	Leonidas & Crystallia	"Emeina Edo"	8	8	8	8	32	Safe
7	Christina & George	"Poso"	7	6	7	8	28	Safe
8	Trifonas & Chara	"A far l'amore comincia tu"/"Skorpia Filia"	7	7	7	7	28	Safe
9	Vicky & Costas	"Xana Mana"	8	7	8	8	31	Safe
10	Tasos & Connie	"Alejandro"	10	9	9	9	37	Safe
11	Ioannis & Chrispa	"Fila Me Akoma"/"Baciami Ancora"	7	6	7	7	27	Eliminated
12	Eteoklis & Eleni	"Mehri to Telos tou Kosmou"	7	6	6	6	25	Safe

=== Week 5 ===
Order	Couple	Song	Judge's Scores				Total	Result
Order	Couple	Song	Vicky	Stamatis	Despina	Maria	Total	Result
1	Christina & George	"Ela sto Horo"	7	7	7	6	27	Eliminated
2	Leonidas & Crystallia	"Arhisan ta Organa"	8	8	8	8	32	Safe
3	Tasos & Connie	"Kyma"	9	10	10	9	38	Safe
4	Eteoklis & Eleni	"Kalokairina Radevou"	7	6	6	6	25	Bottom two
5	Errika & Aris	"Creep"	9	9	8	9	35	Safe
6	Konstantina & Christos	"Vale Fadasia"/"Gynaikes"	6	6	6	6	24	Safe
7	Vicky & Costas	"Thymos"	8	7	7	8	30	Safe
8	Trifonas & Chara	"Eisai to Astro tis Aygis"	8	8	8	8	32	Safe
9	Orpheus & Artemis	"Ola Ayta pou Fovamai"/"How You Remind Me"	9	8	9	9	35	Safe
10	Marios & Aspa	"Saraki"	8	7	7	7	29	Safe
11	George & Despina	"Amarados"	9	10	10	9	38	Safe

=== Week 6 ===
On May 22, 2020, Aspa Tsina announced on her Facebook account that she leaves the show, because of health reasons. The new partner of Marios Priamos Ioannidis was George Lebanis, who was eliminated last week with Christina Vrachali.

Order	Couple	Song	Judge's Scores				Total	Result
Order	Couple	Song	Vicky	Stamatis	Despina	Maria	Total	Result
1	Orpheus & Artemis	"Kamia Fora"	9	9	10	9	37	Safe
2	George & Despina	"Ap' to Vorra mehri to Noto"	8	8	8	8	32	Eliminated
3	Leonidas & Crystallia	"Hit the Road Jack"	7	7	8	8	30	Bottom two
4	Tasos & Connie	"Cry Me a River"	10	10	10	10	40	Safe
5	Eteoklis & Eleni	"Se Paradehomai"	8	8	8	8	32	Safe
6	Trifonas & Chara	"Den Me Theloun"	6	6	6	6	24	Safe
7	Errika & Aris	"Adistrofi Metrisi"	9	9	10	9	37	Safe
8	Konstantina & Christos	"I Wanna Be Loved by You"	8	8	8	8	32	Safe
9	Vicky & Costas	"Tu Vuo Fa' L'Americano"	9	8	9	9	35	Safe
10	Marios & George	"File"	8	8	8	8	32	Safe

=== Week 7 ===
Musical guest: Angela Dimitriou

Order	Couple	Song	Judge's Scores				Total	Result
Order	Couple	Song	Vicky	Stamatis	Despina	Maria	Total	Result
1	Errika & Aris	"Physical"	9	9	9	10	37	Safe
2	Marios & George	"Mia Pista Apo Fosforo"	10	8	9	9	36	Safe
3	Eteoklis & Eleni	"To Gucci ton Masai"	10	9	9	9	37	Safe
4	Tasos & Connie	"To Tragoudi ton Gyfton"	9	8	9	10	36	Safe
5	Vicky & Costas	"An S' Arnitho Agapi mou"	10	9	9	10	38	Safe
6	Orpheus & Artemis	"Let You Love Me"	9	8	9	9	35	Safe
7	Konstantina & Christos	"Ipomoni"	7	7	7	7	28	Safe
8	Leonidas & Crystallia	"Ikariotiko"	8	8	8	8	32	Eliminated
9	Trifonas & Chara	"Lambo"	7	6	7	7	27	Bottom two

=== Week 8 ===
Order	Couple	Song	Judge's Scores				Total	Result
Order	Couple	Song	Vicky	Stamatis	Despina	Maria	Total	Result
1	Orpheus & Artemis	"S'agapo"	9	8	8	8	33	Eliminated
2	Tasos & Connie	"Blood//Water"	10	10	10	10	40	Safe
3	Errika & Aris	"Oso Exo Esena"	9	10	9	9	37	Safe
4	Konstantina & Christos	"Barbie Girl"	8	8	8	8	32	Bottom two
5	Marios & George	"Milo gia Sena"	9	10	10	9	38	Safe
6	Eteoklis & Eleni	"Ela Psihoula Mou"	9	9	9	9	36	Safe
7	Trifonas & Chara	"El Porompompero"	6	6	6	6	24	Safe
8	Vicky & Costas	"Otan sou Horeyo"	10	10	10	9	39	Safe

=== Week 9: Greek Night ===
Musical guest: Snik

Order	Couple	Song	Judge's Scores				Total	Result
Order	Couple	Song	Vicky	Stamatis	Despina	Maria	Total	Result
1	Eteoklis & Eleni	"Agapo Simeni"	8	7	7	8	30	Safe
2	Marios & George	"Gia na s' Ekdikitho"	8	7	9	7	31	Safe
3	Konstantina & Christos	"Roz Bikini"	7	7	7	7	28	Eliminated
4	Tasos & Connie	"Dithesio"	10	10	10	10	40	Safe
5	Errika & Aris	"Klista ta Stomata"	9	8	8	9	34	Safe
6	Vicky & Costas	"Ierosilia"	10	10	9	10	39	Safe
7	Trifonas & Chara	"Areso Paidi Mou"	6	6	6	6	24	Bottom two

=== Week 10: Cinema night ===
Order	Couple	Song	Film	Judge's Scores				Total	Result
Order	Couple	Song	Film	Vicky	Stamatis	Despina	Maria	Total	Result
1	Tasos & Connie	"O Andhras pou tha Pandrevto"	Mermaids and Rascals	10	10	10	10	40	Safe
1	Tasos & Connie	"I Put a Spell on You"	Hocus Pocus	10	10	10	10	40	Safe
2	Marios & George	"Tha Pio Apopse to Feggari"	Mermaids and Rascals	8	8	8	8	32	Eliminated
2	Marios & George	"Ain't No Sunshine"	When We Were Kings/Notting Hill	9	9	9	9	36	Eliminated
3	Trifonas & Chara	"Mia Kota Stroubouli"		6	6	6	7	25	Bottom two
3	Trifonas & Chara	"Crazy Girl"		8	7	7	8	30	Bottom two
4	Errika & Aris	"Maniac"	Flashdance	10	10	10	10	40	Safe
4	Errika & Aris	"Eimai Gynaika tou Glentiou"	Mia Kyria sta Bouzoukia	10	10	10	10	40	Safe
5	Eteoklis & Eleni	"Soy Topa Mia kai Dio kai Tris"	Mikri kai Megali en Drasi	9	9	9	8	35	Safe
5	Eteoklis & Eleni	"You Can Leave Your Hat On"	9½ Weeks	9	9	9	9	36	Safe
6	Vicky & Costas	"Shallow"	A Star Is Born	9	9	8	9	35	Safe
6	Vicky & Costas	"Oi Thalassies sou oi Handres"	I Athina tin Nyhta	8	8	8	8	32	Safe

=== Week 11: Live Semi-final ===
Order	Couple	Song	Judge's Scores				Total	Result
Order	Couple	Song	Vicky	Stamatis	Despina	Maria	Total	Result
1	Eteoklis & Eleni	"Ena Karavi"	8	8	9	9	34	Eliminated
1	Eteoklis & Eleni	"Paliopragmata"	8	8	8	8	32	Eliminated
2	Errika & Aris	"Wrecking Ball"	9	9	9	9	36	Eliminated
2	Errika & Aris	"Why Don't You Do Right?"	10	10	10	10	40	Eliminated
3	Vicky & Costas	"Mirela"	9	9	9	9	36	Safe
3	Vicky & Costas	"Thelo konda sou na Mino"	8	8	8	8	32	Safe
4	Tasos & Connie	"Disturbia"	10	10	10	10	40	Safe
4	Tasos & Connie	"Like a Prayer"	10	10	10	10	40	Safe
5	Trifonas & Chara	"O Telios Andhras"	7	7	7	7	28	Bottom three
5	Trifonas & Chara	"Pirazei pou eimai Firma"	7	6	6	7	26	Bottom three

=== Week 12: Live Final ===
Order	Couple	Song	Judge's Scores				Total	Result
Order	Couple	Song	Vicky	Stamatis	Despina	Maria	Total	Result
1	Trifonas & Chara	"To Astro tis Aygis"	8	8	8	8	32	Third place
1	Trifonas & Chara	"Do You?"	8	8	8	8	32	Third place
1	Trifonas & Chara	"Kivotos"	8	7	7	7	29	Third place
2	Tasos & Connie	"Cry Me a River"	10	10	10	10	40	Winner
2	Tasos & Connie	"Telephone"	10	10	10	10	40	Winner
2	Tasos & Connie	"Kivotos"	10	10	10	10	40	Winner
3	Vicky & Costas	"Kapou S'eho Xanadei"	9	9	9	9	36	Runner-up
3	Vicky & Costas	"Time to Say Goodbye"/"Con te partirò"	10	10	10	10	40	Runner-up
3	Vicky & Costas	"Kivotos"	9	9	9	9	36	Runner-up

== Ratings ==
Episode	Date	Ratings (total)	Ratings (ages 18–54)	Source
1	March 14, 2020	16.9%	14.9%	
2	May 2, 2020	10%	9.9%	
3	May 9, 2020	10.5%	11.3%	
4	May 16, 2020	10.2%	9.7%	
5	May 23, 2020	16.4%	16.8%	
6	May 30, 2020	12%	13.1%	
7	June 6, 2020	12.3%	10.3%	
8	June 13, 2020	14%	12.8%	
9	June 20, 2020	13.4%	13.6%	
10	June 27, 2020	13.2%	13.5%	
11	July 4, 2020	14.3%	12.5%	
12	July 11, 2020	17.6%	19.6%	
Average		13.4%	13.2%	—N/a
