= Giorgos Papadopoulos =

Giorgos Papadopoulos can refer to:

- Giorgos Papadopoulos (singer), born 1985
- Giorgos Papadopoulos (footballer, born 1914)
- Giorgos Papadopoulos (footballer, born 1991)
- Georgios Papadopoulos, Greek military officer (1919–1999)

== See also ==
- George Papadopoulos (disambiguation)
