= Ellada Eheis Talento season 1 =

Ellada Eheis Talento
- Season 1
- Hosted by: Sophia Aliberti
- Judges: Ilias Psinakis; Matthildi Maggira; Vaggelis Perris
- Winner: Christos Zacharopoulos

Release
- Original network: ANT1
- Original release: 23 March – 15 June 2007

Season chronology
- Next → Season 2

The first season of the Greek reality television series Ellada Eheis Talento was broadcast from March 23, 2007 to June 15, 2007. It was hosted by actress and television presenter Sophia Aliberti. The judges of the Greek show were Ilias Psinakis, singers' manager, Vaggelis Perris, TV and radio producer and Matthildi Maggira, actress, TV presenter and comedian. The winner of the first series was 12-year-old singer Christos Zacharopoulos.
