= Popara (album) =

Studio album by Popi Maliotaki
- Released: May 29, 2008
- Recorded: 2008
- Genre: Contemporary laika
- Label: Alpha Records

Popi Maliotaki chronology
| Alli Mia Fora (2006) | Popara (2008) |

Popara (Greek: Ποπάρα; English: Popara) is the title of the third studio album by the popular Greek artist Popi Maliotaki, released in 2008 by Alpha Records (Greek company). This album is the third album who released Maliotaki. After the satire of Lakis Lazopoulos to Popi Maliotaki, Maliotaki replied with satirical way through the song with title "Ime I Popara". After the release of this album, Popi Maliotaki had great success and recognise.

== Track listing ==
| No. | Title | Lyrics | Music | Length |
|---|---|---|---|---|
| 1. | "Ime I Popara (Greek Version)" (Είμαι Η Ποπάρα (Ελληνική Version); Ime I Popara (Greek Version)) | Elisavet Nikolaidou, Maria Adonaki | Andreas Mexas | 2:53 |
| 2. | "Ime I Popara (English Version)" (Είμαι Η Ποπάρα (Αγγλική Version); Ime I Popara (English Version)) | Elisavet Nikolaidou, Maria Adonaki | Andreas Mexas | 2:52 |
| 3. | "Ime I Popara (Turkish Version)" (Είμαι Η Ποπάρα (Τούρκικη Version); Ime I Popara (Turkish Version)) | Elisavet Nikolaidou, Maria Adonaki | Andreas Mexas | 2:52 |
| 4. | "Ime I Popara (Chinese Version)" (Είμαι Η Ποπάρα (Κινέζικη Version); Ime I Popara (Chinese Version)) | Elisavet Nikolaidou, Maria Adonaki | Andreas Mexas | 2:47 |
| 5. | "Ime I Popara (Spanish Version)" (Είμαι Η Ποπάρα (Ισπανική Version); Ime I Popara (Spanish Version)) | Elisavet Nikolaidou, Maria Adonaki | Andreas Mexas | 2:56 |
| 6. | "Ime I Popara (Italian Version)" (Είμαι Η Ποπάρα (Ιταλική Version); Ime I Popara (Italian Version)) | Elisavet Nikolaidou, Maria Adonaki | Andreas Mexas | 2:47 |
| 7. | "Ime I Popara (Cretan Version)" (Είμαι Η Ποπάρα (Κριτική Version); Ime I Popara (Cretan Version)) | Elisavet Nikolaidou, Maria Adonaki | Stefanos Vordonis | 3:26 |
| 8. | "Ime I Popara (Epirus Version)" (Είμαι Η Ποπάρα (Ηπειρώτικη Version); Ime I Popara (Epirus Version)) | Elisavet Nikolaidou, Maria Adonaki | Makis Tsikos | 3:13 |
| 9. | "Ime I Popara (X-Mas Bonus)" (Είμαι Η Ποπάρα (Χριστουγεννιάτικο Bonus); Ime I Popara (X-Mas Bonus)) | Elisavet Nikolaidou, Maria Adonaki | Andreas Mexas | 3:26 |
| 10. | "Alli Mia Fora (Club Mix)" (Άλλη Μια Φορά (Club Mix); Alli Mia Fora (Club Mix)) | Giorgos Papagiannopoulos | Chris K | 3:57 |

== Trivia ==
The song "Ime I Popara" Popi Maliotaki sang in 6 different languages and 3 versions.
