= Aparetiti Agapi Mou =

Studio album by Popi Maliotaki
- Released: 2005
- Recorded: 2005
- Genre: Contemporary laika
- Length: 37:57
- Label: Alpha Records

Popi Maliotaki chronology
Aparetiti Agapi Mou (2005)	Alli Mia Fora (2006)

Aparetiti Agapi Mou (Greek: Απαραίτητη Αγάπη Μου; English: My Necessary Love) is the title of the first studio album by Greek pop-folk artist Popi Maliotaki, released in 2005 by Alpha Records. This album is the debut album who started her career in music. Shortly after the album release, Maliotaki got the 13th place in the official music album list in Greece.

== Track listing ==
No.	Title	Lyrics	Music	Length
1.	"Aparetiti Agapi Mou" (Απαραίτητη Αγάπη Μου; My Necessary Love)	Rania Tikou	Elias Trifonidis	4:03
2.	"Me Ragises" (Με Ράγισες; You Cracked Me)	Rania Tikou	Elias Trifonidis	2:58
3.	"To Lege Lege" (Το λέγε λέγε; Tell Me Tell Me)	Rania Tikou	Elias Trifonidis	3:06
4.	"Ola Ta 'Hame" (Όλα Τα 'Χαμε; All We Have)	Rania Tikou	Elias Trifonidis	2:57
5.	"To Thema Tha Lixi" (Το Θέμα Θα Λήξει; The Matter Will End)	Rania Tikou	Elias Trifonidis	3:16
6.	"Den Tha Katso Ego Na Skaso" (Δεν Θα Κάτσω Εγώ Να Σκάσω; I Will Not Sit To Run Away)	Rania Tikou	Elias Trifonidis	2:56
7.	"Anisihia Mou" (Ανησυχία Μου; My Concern)	Rania Tikou	Elias Trifonidis	3:00
8.	"Opou Ke Na Pas" (Όπου Και Να Πας; Wherever You Go)	Rania Tikou	Elias Trifonidis	3:06
9.	"Allaxe Amesos" (Άλλαξε Αμέσως; Changed Immediately)	Rania Tikou	Elias Trifonidis	3:00
10.	"Me Travmatises" (Με Τραυμάτισες; You Wounded Me)	Rania Tikou	Elias Trifonidis	4:15
11.	"Xenihtise Me" (Ξενύχτησε Με; Stay Up With Me All Night)	Rania Tikou	Elias Trifonidis	3:00
12.	"Ise Mia Trela" (Είσαι Μία Τρέλα; Are You A Craze)	Rania Tikou	Elias Trifonidis	3:40

== Trivia ==
The song "My Necessary Love" has a feature from Haris Akritidis.

== Chart performance ==
Chart	Providers	Peak position
Greek Albums Chart	IFPI	13
