= Kiss Madiam =

Kiss Madiam (Greek: Kiss Μαδιάμ) is a four-member all-male band that won the second season of the Greek version of the Got Talent series, Ellada Eheis Talento.

Kiss Madiam is known for writing comedy music which parodies popular songs by rewriting their lyrics. Some of their songs are "Dolce Gabbana" (based on "Baila Morena") and "Diakopes" (based on the Scorpions song "Holiday" from their 1979 album Lovedrive).
