= Just the 2 of Us (Greek season 8) =

- Season 8
- Hosted by: Nikos Koklonis; Katerina Stikoudi (Backstage)
- Judges: Despina Vandi; Kaiti Garbi; Stamatis Fasoulis; Vicky Stavropoulou
- No. of episodes: 17

Release
- Original network: Alpha TV
- Original release: February 17 – July 5, 2024

The eighth season of the Greek reality show Just the 2 of Us began airing on February 17, 2024, on Alpha TV, for the first time. From the previous season, main host Nikos Koklonis and the judges Despina Vandi, Kaiti Garbi, Stamatis Fasoulis and Vicky Stavropoulou, all returned. The backstage host from the previous season, Katerina Stikoudi returned as well from the 4th Live due to her birth of her second son.

It was revealed that the season eighth would have 15 contestants, but eventually there were 17 contestants. In the second live show two more contestants were added, bringing the total number of contestants, up to 19.

== Judges ==
- Despina Vandi, singer, actress
- Kaiti Garbi, singer
- Stamatis Fasoulis, actor
- Vicky Stavropoulou, actress

=== Couples ===
Celebrity	Occupation	Professional Singer	Status
Giannis Sevdikalis	Athlete	Sofia Kourtidou	Winner
Sotiris Giazitzioglou	Singer	Feidias	Runner-up
Pinelopi Anastasopoulou	Actress	Ian Stratis	Third place
Giorgos Amoutzas	Actor	Tania Breazou	4th place
Galateia Vasiliadi	Businesswoman	Giorgos Papadopoulos	Eliminated 14th
Manolis Klonaris	Actor	Zoe Papadopoulou	Eliminated 13th
Stathis Schizas	Businessman	Malou	Eliminated 12th
Dora Panteli	Journalist	Anastasios Rammos (Episodes 6-14); Giannis Xanthopoulos (Episodes 1-4)	Eliminated 11th
Thanasis Patras	Journalist	Faii Roubini	Eliminated 10th
Konstantinos Gianakopoulos	Actor	Daphne Lawrence	Eliminated 9th
Nausika Panagiotakopoulou	Businesswoman	Christina Miliou	Eliminated 8th
Giannis Kapetanios	Actor	Maria Karlaki	Eliminated 7th
Stelios Droumalias	Journalist	Angela Dimitriou (Episodes 1-5); Apostolia Zoi (Episode 7-9)	Eliminated 6th
Christos Koutras	Journalist	Stella Konitopoulou	Eliminated 5th
Anna Bezan	Actress	Konstantinos Margaritis	Eliminated 4th
Traiana Anania	Actress	Dimitris Kokotas	Withdrew
Alina Kotsovoulou	Actress	Petros Imvrios	Eliminated 3rd
Bagia Antonopoulou	Journalist	Christos Antoniadis	Eliminated 2nd
Rafail Kariotakis	Actor	Joanne	Eliminated 1st

== Scoring chart ==
Couple	Place	Week														
Couple	Place	1	2	3	4	5	6	7	8	9	10	11	12	13	14	15
Giannis & Sofia	1st		24	24	17											
Sotiris & Feidias	2nd		24	24	24											
Pinelopi & Ian	3rd		23	24	24											
Giorgos & Tania	4th		21	25	24											
Galateia & Giorgos	5th		15	20	18											
Manolis & Zoi	6th		18	20	24											
Stathis & Malou	7th		13	20	18	24	20	28	36	32	31		32	32	33	34
Dora & Giannis/Anastasios	8th		19	19	18											
Thanasis & Faye	9th		16	24	24											
Konstantinos & Daphne	10th		24	24	24	22	24	39	36	40	34		37			
Nausika & Christina	11th		16	15	20	20	24	20	28	32	30					
Giannis & Maria	13th	—		20	14	14	19	24	27	22						
Stelios & Antzela/Apostolia	13th		21	20	24	23	-	33	32	28						
Christos & Stella	14th		19	20	17	22	24	28								
Anna & Konstantinos	15th	—		16	16	18	19	13th								
Traiana & Dimitris	16th		24	24	-	23										
Alina & Petros	17th		16	23	17											
Bagia & Christos	18th		15	20												
Rafail & Joanne	19th		20													

Red numbers indicate the lowest score for each week
Green numbers indicate the highest score for each week
the couple eliminated that week
the couple finishing in the bottom two
indicates the couple finishing in the top three of the televoting
indicates the couple that didn't perform due to personal reasons
the winning couple
the runner-up couple
the third-place couple
