= Ellada Eheis Talento =

- Greek: Ελλάδα Έχεις Ταλέντο
- Genre: Reality Talent Show
- Created by: Simon Cowell
- Presented by: Sophia Aliberti; Christos Ferentinos; Giorgos Lianos; Nikos Raptis; Stavros Svigos
- Judges: Vaggelis Perris; Ilias Psinakis; Matthildi Maggira; Eugenia Manolidou; Charis Christopoulos; Giorgos Kapoutzidis; Maria Bakodimou; Sakis Tanimanidis; Crystallia Riga; Elena Christopoulou; Grigoris Arnaoutoglou; Takis Zaharatos
- Country of origin: Greece; Cyprus
- No. of seasons: 7
- No. of episodes: 50

Production
- Producer: Acun Medya (5–6)

Original release
- Network: ANT1 (1–4, 7–); Skai TV (5–6)
- Release: 23 March 2007 – present

Ellada Eheis Talento (Greek: Ελλάδα Έχεις Ταλέντο English: Greece's Got Talent) is a Greek reality television series and is part of the Got Talent multinational franchise. It premiered in Greece for the first time on 23 March 2007 and ended after 4 seasons on 25 June 2012 on the ANT1. On 1 October 2017 the show came back with the fifth season and for the first time from Skai TV, ended after 2 seasons on 16 December 2018. On 8 January 2022 the show returned again on ANT1.

== Format ==
It has been one of the most successful Greek TV shows over the 2007-2012 period. It is a talent show that features singers, dancers, magicians, comedians and other performers of all ages competing for the advertised prize of €100,000. From season 5 the advertised prize of €50,000. It did not only feature Greek people, but also ones from the Greek diaspora. Like the British format, the auditions take place in front of the judges and a live audience. At any time during the audition the judges may show disapproval to the act by pressing a buzzer which lights a red X near them. If all of the judges press their buzzers, the act ends immediately. To advance to the second round, participants need to get at least two positive votes or they would be sent home. From series 5, a new feature was added to the auditions, which had been previously used on Germany's Got Talent, called the "Golden Buzzer". Situated in the centre of the judge's desk, the Golden Buzzer allows a judge to effectively send a contestant(s) into the live semi-finals, regardless of the opinions of the other judges, if they felt that a contestant's performance was outstanding; when pressed, the judge's X turns gold and the stage is showered in gold glitter strips. However, as a general rule, they may only press it once and cannot press it again in later auditions. The semi-final and final shows are broadcast live from Athens.

== Season summary ==
Season	Premiere	Finale	Winner	Network	Host(s)	Judging panel			
Season	Premiere	Finale	Winner	Network	Host(s)	Judge 1	Judge 2	Judge 3	Judge 4
1	23 March 2007	15 June 2007	Christos Zacharopoulos	ANT1	Sophia Aliberti	Vaggelis Perris	Matthildi Maggira	Ilias Psinakis	No fourth Judge
2	24 April 2009	3 July 2009	Kiss Madiam	ANT1	Christos Ferentinos	Vaggelis Perris	Matthildi Maggira	Ilias Psinakis	No fourth Judge
3	19 March 2010	4 June 2010	Nikos Georgas	ANT1	Christos Ferentinos	Vaggelis Perris	Eugenia Manolidou	Ilias Psinakis	No fourth Judge
4	25 March 2012	25 June 2012	Stelios Legakis	ANT1	Christos Ferentinos	Vaggelis Perris	Eugenia Manolidou	Charis Christopoulos	No fourth Judge
5	1 October 2017	21 December 2017	House of Drama	Skai TV	Giorgos Lianos	Giorgos Kapoutzidis	Maria Bakodimou	Sakis Tanimanidis	No fourth Judge
6	30 September 2018	16 December 2018	En Xoro	Skai TV	Giorgos Lianos	Giorgos Kapoutzidis	Maria Bakodimou	Sakis Tanimanidis	No fourth Judge
7	8 January 2022	7 May 2022	Konstantinos Tsamados	ANT1	Nikos Raptis, Stavros Svigos	Takis Zaharatos	Elena Christopoulou	Crystallia Riga	Grigoris Arnaoutoglou

== Seasons ==
=== Season 1 (2007) ===
The first season of Ellada Eheis Talento premiered on 23 March 2007 and ended on 15 June 2007. The winner of the first series was 12-year-old singer Christos Zacharopoulos.

=== Season 2 (2009) ===
The second season of the show started on 24 April 2009 and ended on 3 July 2009. The series was won by the band Kiss Madiam.

=== Season 3 (2010) ===
The third season of the show started on 19 March 2010 and ended on 4 June 2010. It was won by 55-year-old singer Nikos Georgas .

=== Season 4 (2012) ===
ANT1 has announced that the show has been renewed for a fourth season. The show started on 25 March 2012. It was won by 14-year-old student Stelios Legakis (singer/guitar player).

=== Season 5 (2017) ===
The fifth season premiered on 1 October 2017 on Skai TV. The host is Giorgos Lianos and the judges are Sakis Tanimanidis, Maria Bakodimou and Giorgos Kapoutzidis. It was won by acting group House of Drama.

==== Auditions ====
===== Golden Buzzer acts =====
Winner
Finalist
Eliminated

Judge	Name	Role	Act
Sakis Tanimanidis	Judge	HPGC	Singing group
Maria Bakodimou	Judge	Poppin Chris	Dancer
Maria Bakodimou	Judge	Thomais Vlassi	Singer
Giorgos Kapoutzidis	Judge	Art of Soul	Entertainment group
Giorgos Lianos	Presenter	Alexandros Logothetidis	Rapper
Fotis Sergoulopoulos	Guest judge	Nikos Stratis – Tagma	Freestyler
Giorgos Aggelopoulos	Guest judge	Fotis Chalkidis	Singer
Doretta Papadimitriou	Guest judge	House of Drama	Acting group
Panos Mouzourakis	Guest judge	Georgina Muakler	Dancer
Anna Korakaki	Guest judge	Tyler Booth	Dancer
Evaggelia Aravani	Guest judge	Kotinos	Gymnastic group

==== Judge Cuts ====
Each episode will feature a guest-star judge, who will have the ability to hit the golden buzzer and send the act to the semis. For the first episode, the guest-star was Greek presenter and host Fotis Sergoulopoulos, and aired on Monday, 20 November.

===== Guests =====
Episode	Judge	Occupation	Date aired
1	Fotis Sergoulopoulos	Television host	20 Nov. 2017
2	Giorgos Aggelopoulos	Reality show winner	26 Nov. 2017
3	Doretta Papadimitriou	Television presenter	27 Nov. 2017
4	Panos Mouzourakis	Singer	4 Dec. 2017
5	Anna Korakaki	Athlete	10 Dec. 2017
6	Evangelia Aravani	Television presenter	11 Dec. 2017

==== Semi-finals ====
The first semi-final aired on Tuesday 12 December. The second semi-final is set to air on Sunday, 17 December.

==== Finalists ====
Audience vote
Judges' vote

Name	Act
Ntinos Kkanti and Kyriakos Efthimiou	Entertainment act
George Pamboukidis	Magician
Antonia Roumelioti & George Michailidis	Dancers
Art of Soul	Entertainment group

=== Season 6 (2018) ===
The sixth season premiered on 30 September 2018 on Skai TV. The host is Giorgos Lianos and the judges are Sakis Tanimanidis, Maria Bakodimou and Giorgos Kapoutzidis. It was won by acting group En Xoro.

=== Season 7 (2022) ===
The seventh season premiered on 8 January 2022 on ANT1. The hosts were Nikos Raptis and Stavros Svigos. The judges were Crystallia Riga, Elena Christopoulou, Grigoris Arnaoutoglou and Takis Zaharatos. It was won by 14 year old singer Konstantinos Tsamados.
