= Ellada Eheis Talento season 3 =

Ellada Eheis Talento
- Season 3
- Hosted by: Christos Ferentinos
- Judges: Ilias Psinakis; Eugenia Manolidou; Vaggelis Perris; George Levendis (audition guest)
- Winner: Nikos Georgas
- Runner-up: Loukis Agrotis

Release
- Original network: ANT1
- Original release: 19 March – 4 June 2010

Season chronology
- ← Previous; Season 2 Next → Season 4

The 2010 season of Ellada Eheis Talento is the third season of the programme presented by Christos Ferentinos with judges Ilias Psinakis, Eugenia Manolidou and Vaggelis Perris. Eugenia Manolidou was confirmed as a part of the judging panel, replacing Matthildi Maggira. In spite of the rumours, it was also confirmed that Christos Ferentinos will return for hosting the third season of the show. The audition episodes started on 19 March 2010. The semi-final episodes started on 30 April 2010. There were total of 4 semi-finals and a wild card round. The final of the show aired on 4 June 2010. It was won by 55-year-old singer Nikos Georgas, while comparisons had been noted by the judges and by the media as being analogous to the Susan Boyle of Greece.

== Auditions ==
The application process took place throughout January and February 2010.

== Semi-finals ==
The semi-final episodes started on 30 April 2010 and finished on 21 May.

=== Semi-finals summary ===
The "Order" columns list the order of appearance each act made for every episode.

Key	X Buzzed out	Won the public vote	Won the judges' vote	Won the public vote in the studio

==== Semi-final 1 (30 April) ====
Order	Artist	Act	Buzzes and Judges' Choices		
Order	Artist	Act	Psinakis	Manolidou	Perris
1	Acrobarouf	Acrobatics	—	—	—
2	LMC Lockers	Locking Dancing	—	—	—
3	Alexander Katsakis	Beatbox	—	X	X
4	Nikos Diamantopoulos	Magician	—	—	—
5	Joe	Drag Show	—	X	—
6	Ilias and Andraias	Dance of the Glasses	—	—	—
7	No Limits	Parkour	—	—	—
8	Barb Wire Dolls	Group	—	X	—
9	Loukis Agrotis	Speed Painter	—	—	—
10	Pantelis Mpourikos	Michael Jackson Dance	—	X	—
11	Almaza Show	Theatrical Dance	—	X	—
12	Nikos Georgas	Singer	—	—	—

==== Semi-final 2 (7 May) ====
Order	Artist	Act	Buzzes and Judges' Choices		
Order	Artist	Act	Psinakis	Manolidou	Perris
1	Philarmonica of Lamia	Musicians	—	—	—
2	Dead Prezz Junior	Break Dance	—	—	—
3	Grace Niarou	Singer	X	—	X
4	Kelmis and Ermis	Magicians	—	—	—
5	Stylez	BMX FlatLand	—	—	—
6	Xronis Karakasidis	Singer	—	—	—
7	Alex and Lana	Dancers	—	—	—
8	Chris Cross	lissomeness and Quick Escape	—	—	—
9	Rua Mat	Hip Pop Group	—	—	—
10	Dimi	Dancer	—	—	—
11	A.S Kabros	Karate	—	—	—
12	VIP Babe	Sexy Carwash	—	X	—

==== Semi-final 3 (14 May) ====
Order	Artist	Act	Buzzes and Judges' Choices		
Order	Artist	Act	Psinakis	Manolidou	Perris
1	Dimitra Moraiti	Dancer	—	—	—
2	Onana	Singer	—	—	—
3	Uher Julhakian	Music With Spoons	—	—	—
4	Arko	Magicians	—	—	—
5	Miss Diamond	Drag Show	—	—	—
6	Themis Iwannou	Freestyle Football	—	—	—
7	Stefanos Malatzis	Singer	—	—	—
8	Angels	Tae Kwon Do	—	—	—
9	Froixos Papadatos	Spray painting	—	—	—
10	Maybe in Heaven`It Doesn't Rain	Singers/Songwriters	—	—	—
11	Sissi Stamati	Fire Show/Singer	—	X	X

==== Semi-final 4 (21 May) ====
Order	Artist	Act	Buzzes and Judges' Choices		
Order	Artist	Act	Psinakis	Manolidou	Perris
1	LAB Boys	Breakdance	—	—	—
2	Alexander Basileiou	Magician/Singer	—	—	—
3	Playground	Singers/Dancers	—	—	—
4	Marilena Parti	Reverse Speech	—	—	—
5	Immortal Sirious	Dancers/Percussion instrument	—	—	—
6	Adimi	Magician	—	—	—
7	Eleytheria Paradia	Singer	—	—	—
8	Giannis Araxwbitis	Dog Training Coach	—	—	—
9	Alexandros Pamporis	Zeibekiko	—	—	—
10	Eythimios Mixalis	Freestyle Basketball	—	—	—
11	Street Heroes From Brotherhood	Dancers/Lyrics/Singers	—	—	—
12	O Proikismenos	Dancer	—	—	—

== Wild Card Show (28 May) ==
The Wild Card Show was held on 28 May and concludes four acts who came second on public votes, during the semi-finals and six judges pics. For judges pics, each judge had to choose two acts from the semi-finals. One act, who had made it into the Wild Card Show from the public votes, could not participate.

=== Wild Card Show summary ===
The "Order" columns list the order of appearance each act made for every episode.

Key	X Buzzed out	Won the judges' vote	Won the public vote in the studio

Order	Artist	Act	Buzzes and Judges' Choices		
Order	Artist	Act	Psinakis	Manolidou	Perris
1	Rua Mat (Public choice)	Hip Pop Group	—	X	—
2	Stefanos Malatzis (Public choice)	Singer	—	—	—
3	Miss Diamond (Perris choice)	Drag Show	—	—	—
4	Immortal Sirious (Manolidou choice)	Dancers/Percussion instrument	—	—	—
5	Onana (Psinakis choice)	Singer	—	—	—
6	Pantelis Mpourikos (Public choice)	Dancer	—	X	X
7	Barb Wire Dolls (Perris choice)	Group	—	—	—
8	Joe (Psinakis choice)	Drag Show	—	—	—
9	Alex and Lana (Manolidou choice)	Dancers	—	—	—

== Final (4 June) ==
The live final was held on Friday 4 June. Each of the acts performed in front of the judges and vying for the public vote.

=== Final summary ===
Key	Winner	Runner-up

Performance Order	Artist	Genre	Act
1	Dimitra Moraiti	Dancing	Dancer
2	Philarmonica of Lamia		Musicians
3	Alexander Basileiou	/Singing	Magician/Singer
4	Angels		Tae Kwon Do
5	Arko		Magicians
6	Alexandros Pamporis	Dancing	Zeibekiko
7	Onana	Singing	Singer
8	Loukis Agrotis	Speed Painting	Speed Painter
9	Dead Prezz Junior'	Dancing	Break Dancers
10	O Proikismenos	Dancing	Dancer
11	Immortal Sirious	Dancing	Dancers/Percussion instrument
12	Nikos Georgas	Singing	Singer
13	Dimi	Dancing	Dancer
14	Acrobarouf	Acrobatics	
