= Malliotaki =

Malliotaki (Greek: Μαλλιωτάκη) is a Greek surname. Notable people with the surname include:

- Nicole Malliotakis (born 1980), American politician and U.S. Representative
- Popi Malliotaki (Greek: Πόπη Μαλλιωτάκη, born 1971), Greek pop-folk singer
- Rania Malliotaki, Greek journalist and daughter of Popi Maliotaki
