= Just the 2 of Us (Greek TV series) =

- Genre: Reality competition
- Created by: BBC Worldwide
- Directed by: Giannis Mikros (1); Costas Grigorakis (2); Costas Kapetanidis (3–)
- Presented by: Giorgos Kapoutzidis; Zeta Makripoulia; Nikos Koklonis; Backstage; Doukissa Nomikou; Dimitris Ouggarezos; Vicky Kavoura; Laura Karaiskou; Katerina Stikoudi
- Judges: Stefanos Korkolis; Kostas Tournas; Athinais Nega; Lydia Papaioannou; Giorgos Theofanous; Roula Koromila; Dimitris Arvanitis; Krateros Katsoulis; Despina Vandi; Maria Bakodimou; Stamatis Fasoulis; Vicky Stavropoulou; Katy Garbi
- Countries of origin: Greece; Cyprus
- Original language: Greek
- No. of seasons: 9
- No. of episodes: 110

Production
- Executive producers: Dora Pnevmatikatu (3–4); Vangelis Nydriotis (5–)
- Producers: Tony Kontaxakis (3); Nikos Kerkiras (4); Angeliki Rizou (5–)
- Production location: Kapa Studios (3–)
- Running time: 180–200 minutes
- Production companies: Koklonis Media (3); Barking Well Media (4–)

Original release
- Network: Mega Channel
- Release: 17 October 2010 – 18 June 2014
- Network: Open TV
- Release: 14 March 2020 – 23 May 2026
- Network: Alpha TV
- Release: 25 September 2021 – 5 July 2024

Just the 2 of Us is a singing Greek talent show based on the original Britain concept Just the Two of Us. The show aired on Mega Channel on 2010 and 2014, on 2020 was aired on Open TV and since 2021 is airing on Alpha TV.

The Greek version of the show consists of five seasons. The first aired from October 17, 2010, until January 16, 2011, and the second from April 2, 2014, until June 18, 2014. The third season of the show premiered on March 14, 2020. In June 2020, the show was renewed for a fourth season, with the premiere scheduled for October 10, 2020 from the TV station Open TV, with the same presenter and the same judges. The fifth season premiered on September 25, 2021, on Alpha TV, the presenter and the judges, from the previous season, returned.

== Format ==
In every circle branded by the artistic, athletic or even television scene, they duet with a renowned professional singer and prepare a live song every week. The duets are rated by the jury from 1 to 10 for their performance, while still receiving positive votes from the television audience throughout the episode. Each week, the lowest-rated couple leaves the game.

== Cast ==
The first season of the show was presented by Giorgos Kapoutzidis, while the second season was presented by Zeta Makripoulia. Since the third season, Nikos Koklonis hosts the show.

In the backstage, Doukissa Nomikou was in the first season, Dimitris Ouggarezos in the second season, the third season Vicky Kavoura and in the fourth season Laura Karaiskou. Since the fifth season Katerina Stikoudi is the backstage host. In the fifth season, Katerina Kainourgiou replaced Stikoudi in the fourth and fifth episodes, because of her pregnancy.

Stefanos Korkolis, Kostas Tournas, Athinais Nega and Lydia Papaioannou were the judges of the first season.

In the second season, the jury consisted of Giorgos Theofanous, Roula Koromila, Dimitris Arvanitis and Krateros Katsoulis. Director Dimitris Arvanitis stepped down from the show's jury after the 6th live due to the filming of the then-upcoming daily series, Dikaiosi. Actor Krateros Katsoulis took his place from the 7th to the last live show of the show.

Since the third season the panel jury consists of singer Despina Vandi, director and stage producer Stamatis Fasoulis and actress Vicky Stavropoulou. From season three until season five presenter Maria Bakodimou was in the jury. In the sixth season singer Katy Garbi, replaced Bakodimou.

Cast	Season								
Cast	1	2	3	4	5	6	7	8	9
Main host
Giorgos Kapoutzidis	Main								
Zeta Makripoulia		Main							
Nikos Koklonis			Main	Main	Main	Main	Main	Main	Main
Backstage host
Doukissa Nomikou	Main								
Dimitris Ouggarezos		Main							
Vicky Kavoura			Main						
Laura Karaiskou				Main					
Katerina Stikoudi					Main	Main	Main	Main	
Katerina Kainourgiou					Guest				
Tryfonas Samaras									Main
Modern Cinderella									Main
Judges
Stefanos Korkolis	Main								
Kostas Tournas	Main								
Athinais Nega	Main								
Lydia Papaioannou	Main								
Giorgos Theofanous		Main							
Roula Koromila		Main							
Dimitris Arvanitis		Main							
Krateros Katsoulis		Main							
Despina Vandi			Main	Main	Main	Main	Main	Main	
Maria Bakodimou			Main	Main	Main				Guest
Stamatis Fasoulis			Main	Main	Main	Main	Main	Main	Main
Vicky Stavropoulou			Main	Main	Main	Main	Main	Main	Main
Nikos Aliagas					Guest				
Katy Garbi						Main	Main	Main	Main
Dionisis Schinas						Guest		Guest	
Stamatis Gonidis			Guest						
Ilias Psinakis								Guest	
Elli Kokkinou								Guest	
Lefteris Pantazis								Guest	Guest
Alexis Georgoulis									Guest
Eleni Dimou									Guest
Mirka Papakonstantinou									Guest
Giorgos Papadopoulos									Guest
Nikos Mouratidis									Guest
Angela Dimitriou									Guest
Annita Pania									Guest
Evi Droutsa									Guest
Giannis Zouganelis									Guest
Maria Aliferi									Guest
Andreas Mikroutsikos									Guest

== Series overview ==
Season	No. of stars	No. of weeks	Duration dates			Top three ranking		
Season	No. of stars	No. of weeks	Premiere	Finale	Network	Winner	Second place	Third place
1	12	12	October 17, 2010	January 16, 2011	Mega Channel	Panayiotis Petrakis & Eleni Foureira	Maria Bekatorou & Christos Cholidis	Dimitris Ouggarezos & Amaryllis
2	12	12	April 2, 2014	June 18, 2014	Mega Channel	Muriella Kourenti & Giorgos Papadopoulos	Markos Seferlis & Stella Kalli	Dimitris Makalias & Antigoni Psychrami
3	14	12	March 14, 2020	July 11, 2020	Open TV	Tasos Xiarcho & Konnie Metaxa	Vicky Hadjivassiliou & Kostas Karafotis	Trifonas Samaras & Hara Verra
4	14	11	October 17, 2020	December 26, 2020	Open TV	Nassos Papargyropoulos & Josephine	Katerina Zarifi & Anastasios Rammos	Zoi Dimitrakou & Lefteris Pantazis
5	16	15	September 25, 2021	January 1, 2022	Alpha TV	Alexandra Panagiotarou & Katerina Lioliou	Marinos Konsolos & Eleni Dimou	Anna-Maria Psycharaki & Harry Varthakouris
6	15	13	October 8, 2022	December 31, 2022	Alpha TV	Leyteris Mitsopoulos & Lola	Matina Nikolaou & Vassilis Porfyrakis	Panagiotis Triantafyllou & Fotini Darra
7	19	17	February 18, 2023	July 8, 2023	Alpha TV	Iasonas Papamatthaiou & Iro Lechouriti	Louiza Pyriohou & Biased Beast/Kalomira	Natalia Argyraki & Giorgos Vogiatzakis
8	19	17	February 17, 2024	July 5, 2024	Alpha TV	Giannis Sevdikalis & Sofia Kourtidou	Sotiris Giazitzioglou & Feidias	Pinelopi Anastasopoulou & Ian Stratis
9	13	14	February 14, 2026	May 23, 2026	Open TV	Stan & Mary Argyriadou	Daniela Chatzi & Dimitris Skoulos	Aggeliki Iliadi & Michalis Iatropoulos

=== Season 1 (2010-2011) ===
The first season premiered on October 17, 2010, on Mega Channel.

The last show was aired on January 16, 2011, and the couple winners were Panagiotis Petrakis and Eleni Foureira.

==== Couples ====
Celebrity	Occupation	Professional singer	Status
Panayiotis Petrakis	Actor	Eleni Foureira	Winner
Maria Bekatorou	Television Presenter	Christos Cholidis	Runner-up
Dimitris Ouggarezos	Television Presenter	Amaryllis	Third place
Theocharis Ioannidis	Actor	Elpida	Eliminated 9th
Marianna Polychronidi	Actress	Isaias Matiaba	Eliminated 8th
Antonis Vlontakis	Water Polo player	Rallia Christidou	Eliminated 7th
Michalis Mouroutsos	Olympic Taekwondo Champion	Georgia Kefala	Eliminated 6th
Michalis Iatropoulos	Actor	Flora Theodorou	Eliminated 5th
Katerina Stikoudi	Television Presenter, Model	Nikos Mihas	Eliminated 4th
Eleni Filini	Actress	Kostas Karafotis	Eliminated 3rd
Evi Adam	Model	Lefteris Pantazis	Eliminated 2nd
Maria Korinthiou	Actress	Bo	Eliminated 1st

=== Season 2 (2014) ===
The second season premiered on April 2, 2014, on Mega Channel. There were 12 couples, 6 boys contestant and 6 girls contestant.

The last show was aired on June 18, 2014, and the couple winners were Muriella Courenti and Giorgos Papadopoulos.

==== Couples ====
Celebrity	Occupation	Professional singer	Status
Myriella Kourenti	Actress	Giorgos Papadopoulos	Winner
Markos Seferlis	Actor, Director, Television Presenter	Stella Kalli	Runner-up
Dimitris Makalias	Actor	Antigoni Psychrami	Third place
Ivan Svitailo	Actor, Dancer	Elena Tsagrinou	Eliminated 9th
Minos Theocharis	Actor	Courtney Parker	Eliminated 8th
George Paraschos	Model, Actor	Katerina Stanisi	Eliminated 7th
Christina Politi	Journalist	Stelios Dionyssiou	Eliminated 6th
Rania Kostaki	Radio producer	Giorgos Giannias	Eliminated 5th
Teta Kaboureli	Television Presenter, Aesthetic	Charis Varthakouris	Eliminated 4th
Rania Thraskia	Television Presenter, Journalist	Nikolaos Karagiaouris	Eliminated 3rd
Giannis Apostolakis	Chef	Elisavet Spanou	Eliminated 2nd
Theofania Papathoma	Actress	Giorgos Papadimitrakis	Eliminated 1st

=== Season 3 (2020) ===
The third season premiered on March 14, 2020, on Open TV. There were 14 couples, 8 boys contestant and 6 girls contestant.

The last show was aired on July 11, 2020, and the couple winners were Tasos Xiarchos and Connie Metaxa.

==== Couples ====
Celebrity	Occupation	Professional singer	Status
Tasos Xiarcho	Choreographer	Konnie Metaxa	Winner
Vicky Hadjivassiliou	Television Presenter, Journalist	Kostas Karafotis	Runner-up
Trifonas Samaras	Hair Stylist	Hara Verra	Third place
Errika Prezerakou	Pole vaulter	Aris Makris	Eliminated 10th
Eteoklis Pavlou	Champion Canoe Kayak	Eleni Hatzidou	Eliminated 10th
Marios Priamos Ioannidis	Television Presenter	Aspa Tsina (weeks 1–5); George Lebanis (weeks 6–10)	Eliminated 9th
Konstantina Spyropoulou	Television Presenter	Christos Zotos	Eliminated 8th
Orpheus Papadopoulos	Actor	Artemis Matafia	Eliminated 7th
Leonidas Kalfagiannis	Actor	Crystallia	Eliminated 6th
Giorgos Giannopoulos	Actor	Despina Olympiou	Eliminated 5th
Christina Vrachali	Journalist	Giorgos Lebanis	Eliminated 4th
Giannis Drymonakos	Olympic Swimmer	Chrispa	Eliminated 3rd
Nicoletta Karra	Actress	Valandis	Eliminated 2nd
Christina Pappa	Actress	Konstantinos Frantzis	Eliminated 1st

=== Season 4 (2020) ===
The fourth season premiered on October 17, 2020, on Open TV.

==== Couples ====
Celebrity	Occupation	Professional singer	Status
Nassos Papargyropoulos	Businessman, Actor	Josephine	Winner
Katerina Zarifi	Journalist, TV hostess	Anastasios Rammos	Runner-up
Zoi Dimitrakou	Basketball player	Lefteris Pantazis	Third place
Zenia Bonatsou	Actress	Vangelis Kakouriotis	Eliminated 10th
Natasa Kalogridi	Actress	Nikolas Raptakis	Eliminated 10th
Evridiki Valavani	Sports Journalist	Ilias Vrettos	Eliminated 8th
Alexandra Katsaiti	Stylist	Giorgos Tsalikis	Eliminated 8th
Antonis Loudaros	Actor	Penny Baltatzi	Eliminated 7th
Thanasis Passas	Comedian	Gogo Tsamba	Eliminated 6th
Trifonas Samaras	Hairstylist	Efi Sarri	Eliminated 5th
Giannis Athitakis	Actor, Model	Zozo Sapountzaki	Eliminated 4th
Parthena Horozidou	Actress	Christos Cholidis	Eliminated 3rd
Alexis Pappas	Actor	Christina Salti	Eliminated 2nd
Evridiki Papadopoulou	Model, Businesswoman	Triantafillos	Eliminated 1st

=== Season 5 (2021-2022) ===
The fifth season premiered on September 25, 2021, on Alpha TV. There were 14 couples, 8 girls contestant and 6 boys contestant.

==== Couples ====
Celebrity	Occupation	Professional singer	Status
Alexandra Panagiotarou	Model, Businessman	Katerina Lioliou	Winner
Marinos Konsolos	Actor	Eleni Dimou	Runner-up
Anna-Maria Psycharaki	TV Personality, Lawyer	Harry Varthakouris	Third place
Nikos Barkoulis	TikToker	Evelina Nikoliza	Eliminated 10th
Laura Narjes	TV presenter	Nikiforos	Eliminated 10th
James Kafetzis	TV Personality, Businessman	Irini Papadopoulou	Eliminated 10th
Super Kiki	Stand-up comedian	George Velissaris	Eliminated 9th
Marina Patouli	Educator, Philologist	Stelios Dionysiou	Eliminated 8th
Mara Meimaridi	Author, Living Consultant	Stan	Eliminated 7th
Piyi Devetzi	Olympic athlete	Thanos Petrelis	Eliminated 6th
Ioanna Touni	Model, Influencer	Nikiforos	Withdrew
Dimitris Alexandrou	Model, TV presenter	Kelly Kelekidou	Eliminated 5th
Sasa Stamati	Journalist, TV Presenter	Themis Adamantidis	Eliminated 4th
Eleni Voulgaraki	TV Presenter, Radio producer	Konstantinos Pantelidis	Eliminated 3rd
Costas Fragolias	Model, TV Presenter	Mando	Eliminated 2nd
Dimosthenis Tzoumanis	TV Personality, Model, Real Estate Agent	Giota Griva	Eliminated 1st

=== Season 6 (2022) ===
The sixth season premiered on October 8, 2022, on Alpha TV.

==== Couples ====
Celebrity	Occupation	Professional singer	Status
Leyteris Mitsopoulos	Comedian	Lola	Winner
Matina Nikolaou	Actress	Vassilis Porfyrakis	Runner-up
Panagiotis Triantafyllou	Paralympic fencing champion	Fotini Darra	Third place
Ilaira Zisi	Graduate of music studies	Mauritius Mauritius	Eliminated 11th
Ioannis Melissanidis	Olympic champion in artistic gymnastics	Melina Makri	Eliminated 10th
Afroditi Gerokonstanti	TV Personality	Panagiotis Rafailidis	Eliminated 10th
Pavlos Stamatopoulos	Journalist	Angela Dimitriou	Eliminated 9th
Tolis Papadimitriou	Screenwriter, Actor	Bessy Argyraki	Eliminated 9th
Natali Kakkava	Journalist, TV presenter	Kostas Ageris	Eliminated 8th
DJ Pitsi	DJ	Stefanos Pitsiniagas	Eliminated 7th
Vicky Koulianou	Model, Actress	Aris Petrakis	Eliminated 6th
Nancy Paradisanou	Journalist	Sotis Volanis	Eliminated 5th
Angelos Bratis	Fashion Designer	Sabrina	Eliminated 4th
Valentino	DJ	Jenny Katsigianni	Eliminated 3rd
Spyros Nikolaidis	Actor, Model	Thelxi	Eliminated 2nd
Yannis Katinakis	Comedian, Radio Producer	Sophia Arvaniti	Eliminated 1st

=== Season 7 (2023) ===
The seventh season premiered on February 18, 2023, on Alpha TV.

==== Couples ====
Celebrity	Occupation	Professional singer	Status
Iasonas Papamathaiou	Actor	Iro Lehouriti	Winner
Louiza Pyriohou	Actress	Kalomoira Sarantis (Episodes 13–17); Biased Beast Christoforos Ilia (Episodes 1–12)	Runner-up
Natalia Argyraki	Journalist	Giorgos Vogiatzakis	Third place
Felicia Tsalapati	Journalist, TV presenter	Triantafillos Chatzinikolaou	4th Place
Giorgos Kopsidas	Actor	Stefania Rizou	Eliminated 14th
Aris Soiledis	Football Player	Marianta Pieridi	Eliminated 14th
Giannis Papamixail	Musician	Eirini Merkouri	Eliminated 13th
Pantelis Toutountzis	Make up Artist	Katerina Stanisi	Eliminated 12th
Foivos Papadakis	Journalist	Xristina Maragozi	Eliminated 11th
Sofia Pavlidou	Actress	Zerom Kalouta	Eliminated 10th
Evi Droutsa	Lyricist	Bo	Eliminated 9th
Sofia Vogiatzaki	Actress	Sarbel	Eliminated 8th
Stefanos Konstantinidis	Journalist	Litsa Giagousi	Eliminated 7th
Vlassis Cholevas	Fashion Designer	Morfoula Iakovidou	Eliminated 6th
Spyros Bibilas	Actor	Julie Massino	Eliminated 5th
Stella Solomidou	Cook	Panos Kallidis	Eliminated 4th
Periclis Kondylatos	Jewellery Designer	Elena Grekou	Eliminated 3rd
Maria Antona	Journalist	Eirini Mihail	Eliminated 2nd
Julia Nova	Model	Ria Ellinidou	Eliminated 1st

=== Season 8 (2024) ===
The eight season premiered on February 17, 2024, on Alpha TV.

==== Couples ====
Celebrity	Occupation	Professional Singer	Status
Giannis Sevdikalis	Athlete	Sofia Kourtidou	Winner
Sotiris Giazitzioglou	Singer	Feidias	Runner-up
Pinelopi Anastasopoulou	Actress	Ian Stratis	Third place
Giorgos Amoutzas	Actor	Tania Breazou	4th place
Galateia Vasiliadi	Businesswoman	Giorgos Papadopoulos	Eliminated 14th
Manolis Klonaris	Actor	Zoe Papadopoulou	Eliminated 13th
Stathis Schizas	Businessman	Malou	Eliminated 12th
Dora Panteli	Journalist	Anastasios Rammos (Episodes 6–14); Giannis Xanthopoulos (Episodes 1–4)	Eliminated 11th
Thanasis Patras	Journalist	Faii Roubini	Eliminated 10th
Konstantinos Gianakopoulos	Actor	Daphne Lawrence	Eliminated 9th
Nausika Panagiotakopoulou	Businesswoman	Christina Miliou	Eliminated 8th
Giannis Kapetanios	Actor	Maria Karlaki	Eliminated 7th
Stelios Droumalias	Journalist	Angela Dimitriou (Episodes 1–5); Apostolia Zoi (Episode 7–9)	Eliminated 6th
Christos Koutras	Journalist	Stella Konitopoulou	Eliminated 5th
Anna Bezan	Actress	Konstantinos Margaritis	Eliminated 4th
Traiana Anania	Actress	Dimitris Kokotas	Withdrew
Alina Kotsovoulou	Actress	Petros Imvrios	Eliminated 3rd
Bagia Antonopoulou	Journalist	Christos Antoniadis	Eliminated 2nd
Rafail Kariotakis	Actor	Joanne	Eliminated 1st

=== Season 9 (2026) ===
The ninth season premiered on February 14, 2026, on Open TV.

==== Couples ====
Celebrity	Occupation	Professional Singer	Status
Mary Argyriadou	Journalist	Kostas Doxas (Episodes 1–2); Stan (Episodes 3-14)	Winner
Dimitris Skoulos	Photographer	Daniela Chatzi	Runner-up
Gio Kay (Episodes 1–7); Michalis Iatropoulos (Episodes 9-14)	Businessman/Actor	Aggeliki Iliadi	Third place
Charis Lebidakis	Journalist	Fay Theochari	Eliminated 10th
DJ Deleasis	Singer	Efi Thodi	Eliminated 9th
Ilias Gotsis	Content Creator	Thomais Apergi	Eliminated 8th
Mary Vitinaros	Model	Steve Provis	Eliminated 7th
Lakis Gavalas	Designer	Shaya	Eliminated 6th
Thanasis Viskadourakis	Actor	Xenia Verra	Eliminated 5th
Giorgos Papacharalampous	Trainer	Matina Zara	Eliminated 4th
Elena Konsta	Radio Producer	Giannis Grosis	Eliminated 3rd
Chara Tsioli	Comedian	Stathis Angelopoulos	Eliminated 2nd
Daphne Karavokiri	Journalist	Elena Tsagrinou	Eliminated 1st
