= George Papadopoulos (disambiguation) =

George Papadopoulos (born 1987) is an American political adviser.

George Papadopoulos may also refer to:

- Giorgos Papadopoulos (footballer, born 1914)
- Georgios Papadopoulos (1919–1999), the head of the military coup d'état that took place in Greece in 1967
- Giorgos Papadopoulos (singer) (born 1985), Greek singer
- Giorgos Papadopoulos (footballer, born 1991)
- George Papadopolis, a character in the 1983–1989 sitcom Webster
