= Sophia Aliberti =

Greek actress

Sophia Aliberti Σοφία Αλιμπέρτη
- Born: Sophia Parlama (Σοφία Παρλαμά); 3 March 1963 (age 63); Corfu, Greece
- Occupations: Actress, television host, model
- Spouse: Yiannis Parios (m. 1996; div. 1998)

Sophia Aliberti (Greek: Σοφία Αλιμπέρτη) is a Greek talk show and game show host since 2004, television actress and former fashion model.

== Filmography ==
=== Movies ===
Year	Title	Role	Notes	Ref.
1981	The jackals: A social problem	Athena Fotiadou	Film debut	
1981	Apartment for ten	girl in the pool		
1981	The Opposite	Poly Veli		
1982	The turn	Stefi		
1982	To start with..good evening	Lilian		
1983	The dangerous	Sophia Chalkia		
1983	Kamikaze my love	Sophia Paschalidi		
1984	Female menagerie	Sophie		
1985	The Scarecrow	Fotini		
1985	Rakos no14: The first punch-boy	Myrto		
1985	Puss the little puss	Mara Tramba	Video movie	
1985	The lions of love	Bella Chatziantoniou	Video movie	
1986	The television monsters	Marina		
1986	The driver and the chick	Polin	Video movie	
1986	The fool boy of Ellen	Ellen	Video movie	
1987	Lordan the Barbarian	Barbara		
1987	The guys from Chelidona	Flora		
1987	The wise and Sophia: No1	Sophia Zolani	Video movie	
1987	The virgin and the doll	Teta	Video movie	
1987	A doll for the cap	Maria	Video movie	
1987	The rich and the waiter	Sissy Ronasi	Video movie	
1988	Do you love me?	reporter		
1988	The allure of money		Video movie	
1988	Before the train leaves	Christina	Video movie	
1989	The card player and the hamini		Video movie	
1989	Back from yesterday	Alice	Video movie	
1989	Without future	Tania Avgeriou	Video movie	
1989	The wise and Sophia: No2	Sophia Zolani	Videon movie	
1989	A naughty girl	Sophia	Video movie	

=== Television ===
Year	Title	Role(s)	Notes
1983	Daily Issues		1 episode
1983	Theatrical One Acts		Episode: "The jealous old man"
1989-1990	Here is your chance	Herself (host)	Season 7
1990-1991	Amore Hotel	Lydia	Lead role / 13 episodes
1990-1992	In the shadow of money		Lead role / 85 episodes
1993-1994	Calm down dad!		Lead role / 24 episodes
1994-1995	Another in the morning, another at night	Annita Prokopiou	Lead role / 26 episodes
1995-1997	Stand up Sophia	Sophia Spathi	Lead role / 51 episodes
1999-2000	Soulmates	Sophia	Lead role / 34 episodes
2000-2001	Secretary for crying	Liza Stratou	Lead role / 36 episodes
2002-2004	My sweetest lie	Marina Valvi	Lead role / 57 episodes
2004-2006	We missed that!	Herself (host)	Weekend morning talk show on Alpha TV
2005-2006	Super Bingo	Herself (host)	Game show
2006	Fame Story	Herself (host)	Season 4
2006-2009	Well done and it's coming!	Herself (host)	Weekend morning talk show on ANT1
2007	Greece's Got Talent	Herself (host)	Season 1
2007-2009	Are You Smarter than a 10 Year Old?	Herself (host)	Game show
2023–present	Live Differently with Sophia Aliberti	Herself (host)	Daytime talk show based on The Dr. Oz Show
