= Lobby Music =

Greek record label

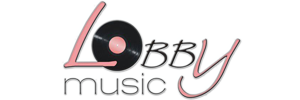
- Founded: 2010
- Distributor(s): Mousiko Tahidromio
- Country of origin: Greece
- Location: Athens
- Official website: www.lobbymusic.gr

Lobby Music is a record company, headquartered in Paleo Faliro, Greece, founded in 2010 by composer Nektarios Bitros. The record company has released several songs from notable artists of the Greek music industry.

The makers of the record company managed in the first five years of operation to sign contracts with several established Greek artists as well as new artists. Lobby Music has been credited with platinum and gold albums from releases.

== Artists ==
The following artists are members of Lobby Music.

- Themis Adamantidis
- Giorgos Daskoulidis
- Angela Dimitriou
- Stelios Dionisiou
- Zafeiris Melas
- Angelos Michail
- Konstantinos Rallis
- Vasilis Terlegas
- Chara Verra

=== Former artists ===
These artists were formerly with Lobby.

- Popi Maliotaki
- Alekos Zazopoulos
