= 100% (Angela Dimitriou album) =

Studio album by Angela Dimitriou
- Released: 15 May 1998
- Recorded: Phase One studio Libra studio
- Genre: Contemporary laika
- Length: 50:27
- Language: Greek
- Label: Minos EMI
- Producer: Vaggelis Yiannopoulos

Angela Dimitriou chronology
| Mi Mas Agapas (1996) | 100% (1998) | Kane Stin Akri (1999) |

Singles from 100%
- 1. "100%" Released: May 1998; 2. "Den Ise Tipota" Released: July 1998; 3. "Akatikites I Nihtes" Released: September 1998

100% (Greek: Εκατό Τοις Εκατό; English: One Hundred Percent) is the 22nd studio album by Greek singer Angela Dimitriou. This was her third collaboration with Phoebus who composed all the tracks. It was released on 15 May 1998 by Minos EMI and soon certified gold. After a few months it reached platinum status in Greece, selling over 80,000 units. It was also released in Turkey and certified quadruple-platinum, selling 200,000 units.

== Track listing ==
All music is composed by Phoebus.

| No. | Title | Lyrics | Length |
|---|---|---|---|
| 1. | "100%" | Phoebus | 4:10 |
| 2. | "Den Ise Tipota" (Δεν Είσαι Τίποτα; You're Nothing) | Vaggelis Konstantinidis | 2:27 |
| 3. | "Akatikites I Nihtes" (Ακατοίκητες Οι Νύχτες; Uninhabited Nights) | Vaggelis Konstantinidis | 3:45 |
| 4. | "Adianoito" (Αδιανόητο; Unthinkable) | Phoebus | 3:28 |
| 5. | "Tha S' Onirefto" (Θα Σ' Ονειρευτώ; I'll Dream of You) | Phoebus | 4:08 |
| 6. | "T' Anapospasto Kommati" (Τ' Αναπόσπαστο Κομμάτι; The Inseparable Part) | Phoebus | 3:30 |
| 7. | "Terma" (Τέρμα; End) | Phoebus | 3:09 |
| 8. | "Tha Sou Lipo" (Θα Σου Λείπω; You'll Miss Me) | Phoebus | 3:38 |
| 9. | "Mi Me Rotas" (Μη Με Ρωτάς; Don't Ask Me) | Vaggelis Konstantinidis | 3:53 |
| 10. | "Emena Ke Ta Matia Sou" (Εμένα Και Τα Μάτια Σου; Me And Your Eyes) | Phoebus | 4:03 |
| 11. | "Skoni" (Σκόνη; Dust) | Phoebus | 3:52 |
| 12. | "Agnoristos" (Αγνώριστος; Unrecognized) | Phoebus | 3:16 |
| 13. | "Me Thigmeno Egoismo" (Με Θιγμένο Εγωισμό; With Aggrieved Selfishness) | Vaggelis Konstantinidis | 3:03 |
| 14. | "Bravo sou" (Μπράβο Σου; Good For You) | Vaggelis Konstantinidis | 4:04 |
| Total length: | | | 50:27 |

== Singles ==
The following singles were officially released to radio stations with music videos. The songs "Adianoito", "Tha Sou Lipo", "Mi Me Rotas" and "Skoni", despite not having been released as singles, managed to gain radio airplay.

- 100%
- Den Ise Tipota (You're Nothing)
- Akatikites I Nihtes (Uninhabited Nights)

== Credits ==
Credits adapted from liner notes.

=== Personnel ===
- Takis Anagnostou – backing vocals (tracks 1, 3, 4, 5, 6, 7, 8, 10, 11, 12, 14)
- Hakan Bingolou – cura (tracks 1, 14) • cümbüş (tracks 7, 8) • säz (tracks 1, 3, 5, 10, 12, 14)
- Giannis Bithikotsis – bouzouki (tracks 2, 6, 9, 11, 13) • cura (tracks 11, 12) • baglama (tracks 2, 6, 9, 11, 12, 13)
- Achilleas Dantilis – keyboards (tracks 4, 6)
- Pavlos Diamantopoulos – bass (tracks 1, 2, 4, 5, 6, 8, 9, 10, 11, 12, 13)
- Vaggelis Giannopoulos – backing vocals (tracks 4, 5, 6, 8, 12, 14)
- Antonis Gounaris – guitars (tracks 1, 2, 3, 4, 5, 6, 7, 8, 9, 10, 11, 12, 13)
- Anna Ioannidou – backing vocals (tracks 1, 3, 4, 5, 6, 7, 8, 10, 11, 12, 13, 14) • second vocal (track 2)
- Telis Ketselidis – orchestration, programming, keyboards (tracks 2, 9, 13)
- Katerina Kiriakou, Giorgos Lebesis, Alex Panayi, Chrisoula Papazeti – backing vocals (tracks 1, 3, 4, 5, 6, 7, 8, 10, 11, 12, 14)
- Fedon Lionoudakis – accordion (tracks 6, 11, 13)
- Takis Livanos – second vocal (tracks 5, 9, 13)
- Andreas Mouzakis – drums (tracks 1, 2, 4, 5, 6, 8, 9, 10, 11, 12, 13, 14)
- Phoebus – orchestration, programming, keyboards (tracks 1, 3, 4, 5, 6, 7, 8, 10, 11, 12, 14) • backing vocals (tracks 4, 5, 6, 8, 12, 14)
- Giorgos Roilos – percussion (tracks 1, 2, 3, 4, 5, 6, 8, 10, 11, 12, 14)
- Thanasis Vasilopoulos – clarinet (tracks 3, 5, 8) • ney (tracks 5, 7)
- Nikos Zervas – keyboards (tracks 5, 8)

=== Production ===
- Thodoris Chrisanthopoulos (Fabelsound) – mastering
- Ntinos Diamantopoulos – photographer
- Vaggelis Giannopoulos – executive producer
- Tolis Ketselidis – sound engineer (tracks 2, 9, 13)
- Giorgos Stabolis – sound engineer (all except 2, 9 & 13) • editing
- Manolis Vlachos – sound engineer (all except 2, 9 & 13) • mix engineer
- Krina Vronti – art direction

== Charts ==
| Chart | Providers | Certification |
|---|---|---|
| Greece | IFPI | Platinum |
| Turkey | Turkey Charts | 4×Platinum |
