= Ellada Eheis Talento season 4 =

Ellada Eheis Talento
- Season 4
- Hosted by: Christos Ferentinos
- Judges: Vaggelis Perris; Eugenia Manolidou; Charis Christopoulos
- Winner: Stelios Legakis
- Runner-up: Giorgos Ioannou

Release
- Original network: ANT1
- Original release: 25 March – 25 June 2012

Season chronology
- ← Previous; Season 3

The fourth season of Ellada Eheis Talento began on 25 March 2012. The show is hosted by Christos Ferentinos. Katerina Gagaki, marketing executive of ANT1, confirmed that Vaggelis Perris and Eugenia Manolidou would return as judges. Ilias Psinakis decided not to return for the fourth season. The third judge would be the photographer Charis Christopoulos, a judge from Next Top Model.
