= Vicky Hadjivassiliou =

Greek author

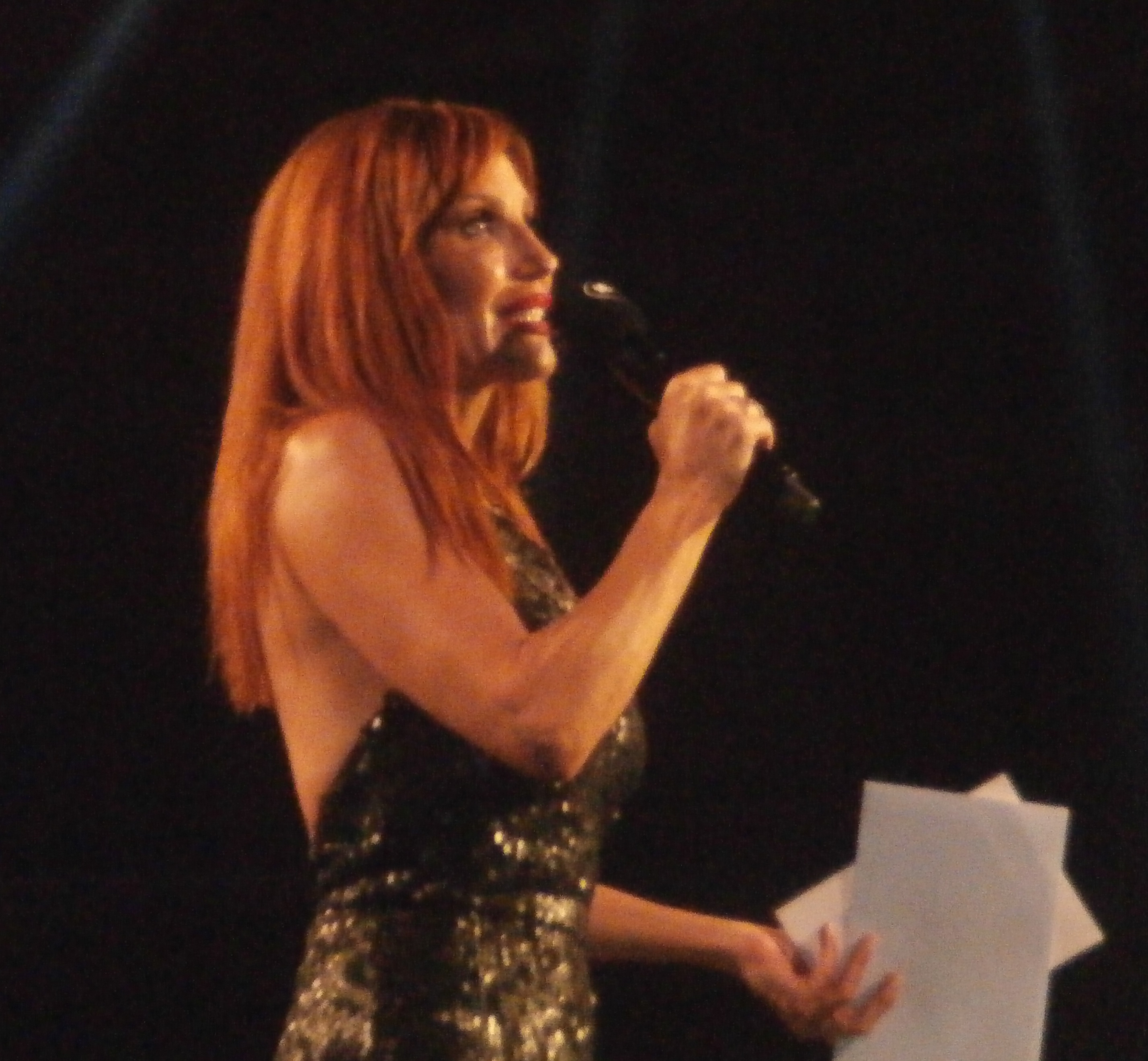
Vicky Hadjivassiliou at MAD Video Music Awards 2017

Evridiki (Vicky) Hadjivassiliou (Greek: Βίκυ Χατζηβασιλείου, two birthdays listed ? born: 9 February 1964), also spelling as Hadjivasiliou or Hadjivasileiou, is a Greek author, television presenter and local politician who stood for PASOK in Thessaloniki, Greece. She was born on 10 February 1971 in Thessaloniki and was raised there with her brother, Phoebus by their father Vassilis and their mother Chryssoula.

Hadjivassiliou wrote various books about healthy diet and tips for long-living as well as many articles for magazines of Athens and Thessaloniki. She currently presents the television show "Pame paketo" (The Package) on Alpha TV.

She is married to Ioannis Akkas and together they have two sons, Christos and Orfeus.

== Filmography ==
=== Television ===
Year	Title	Role(s)	Notes
1988-1991	TV 100 Central News	Herself (anchor)	Daily central news on TV 100
1988-1991	We and our world	Herself (host)	Daytime talk show; also creator and executive producer
1992-2000	Kalimera Ellada	Herself (co-host)	Daytime morning television show; season 1-9
2000-2001	Morning Itinerary	Herself (host)	Daytime morning television show; also creator and executive producer
2000-2001	Eviva	Herself (host)	Weekend health show; also creator and executive producer
2001-2004	Life is the reason	Herself (host)	Daytime lifestyle show; also creator
2001-2004	Alpha News	Herself (co-host)	Daily central news on Alpha TV
2004-2019	You have a letter / Pame Paketo	Herself (host)	Reality television on Alpha TV; also creator
2018	Dancing with the Stars	Herself (guest judge)	Live 7; season 6
2019	My Style Rocks	Herself (guest judge)	Final; season 2
2020	Just the 2 Of Us	Herself (contestant)	Runner-up; season 3
2020	A letter for you	Herself (host)	Reality television spin-off of Pame Paketo; also creator
2025	Real View	Herself (guest host)	Episode: "December 11, 2025"

=== Film ===
Year	Title	Role	Notes
2014	The bird of Cyprus	Vicky Kadjivassiliou	Film debut
