= Giorgos Kapoutzidis =

Greek screenwriter and actor

Georgios Kapoutzidis
- Γεώργιος Καπουτζίδης
- Born: 31 July 1972 (age 54); Serres, Macedonia, Kingdom of Greece
- Occupations: Screenwriter; actor
- Notable work: Sto Para Pente

Georgios "Giorgios" Kapoutzidis (Greek: Γεώργιος "Γιώργος" Καπουτζίδης; born 31 July 1972) is a Greek screenwriter and actor.

He is the creator of the critically successful television series Saturday-born (Σαββατογεννημένες, Savvatogennimenes), In the nick of time (Στο παρά 5, Sto Para Pente) and Greek national (Εθνική Ελλάδος, Ethniki Ellados). He has won three television awards, for best screenplay, for the series Savvatogennimenes and Sto Para Pente (twice).

In May 2006, he was the commentator for the Greek TV, ERT, in the 51st Eurovision Song Contest, which took place in Athens. He also wrote the scripts for the presenters Maria Menounos and Sakis Rouvas in both the semi-final and final. He was the commentator for the Hellenic Broadcasting Corporation (ERT), in the Eurovision Song Contest from 2013 to 2022 (except 2018), alongside radio producer, Maria Kozakou.

In 2016, Kapoutzidis was selected to be the presenter of the third season of The Voice of Greece. In 2017, he returned to present The Voice and was selected to be a judge in the fifth season of Ellada Eheis Talento alongside Sakis Tanimanidis and Maria Bakodimou.

== Filmography ==
=== Film ===
Year	Title	Role	Notes	Ref.
2006	Illustration	Agis Moundreas	film debut	
2007	Meet the Robinsons	Carl	voice role (in greek)	
2009	Soula Ela Xana	Himself	cameo appearance	
2009	Up	Alpha	voice role (in greek)	
2009	The Heiress	gynecologist		
2010	A Turtle's Tale: Sammy's Adventures	Sammy	voice role (in greek)	
2013	Planes	Dusty Crophopper	voice role (in greek)	
2014	Planes: Fire & Rescue	Dusty Crophopper	voice role (in greek)	
2018	The Grinch	Grinch	voice role (in greek)	
2023	One World, Two Faces	Himself (narrator)	documentary	

=== Television ===
Year	Title	Role(s)	Notes
2000	Forbidden Love		Television debut
2002–2003	Camera Café	Himself (writer)	Greek adaptation of French tv series
2003–2004	Saturdayborn	Jose Gutierez, Himself (writer)	Main role, 33 episodes
2005	The Nanny	dc. Papasotiriou	1 episode
2005–2007	Sto Para Pente	Spyros Deloglou, Himself (writer)	Lead role, 49 episodes
2006	Feel the fun	Himself (host)	Variety talk show
2006	Greek Finals of Eurovision Participation	Himself (commentator)	TV special
2006	Eurovision Song Contest 2006	Himself (commentator)	TV special
2007	MEGA Telethon - Chain of love for hope	Himself (host)	MEGA TV special
2008	Singles 3	Padelis	Episode: "The force of habit"
2008	The Red Suite	Asimakis Bakolas	Episode: "Red hostage"
2009–2010	The Twenty	Himself (host)	Variety show on MEGA; also writer and creative director, 15 episodes
2010	Talk Dirty to Me	Denos	Episode: "Extra katsaridoctol"
2010	Love in Action	Himself (writer)	TV movie on MEGA
2010	2009 Madame Figaro Awards Cyprus - Women of the Year	Himself (host)	TV special
2010	2010 Madame Figaro Awards Greece - Women of the Year	Himself (co-host)	TV special
2010–2011	Just the 2 Of Us	Himself (host)	Season 1; also creative director
2011	2010 Madame Figaro Awards Cyprus - Women of the Year	Himself (host)	TV special
2011–2013	Company in the kitchen	Himself (host)	Daytime cook show on MEGA
2013–2014	Eurosong: A MAD Show	Himself (host)	TV special
2013–2017, 2019–2022, 2025-2026	Eurovision Song Contest	Himself (commentator)	TV special
2015	National Team	Christos Melitis, Himself (writer)	Lead role, 15 episodes
2015	2015 Time Out Eating Awards	Himself (host)	TV special
2015–2016	I have no words!	Himself (host)	Daytime game show on MEGA; season 2
2016–2018, 2024-today	The Voice of Greece	Himself (host)	Season 3-5, 10-11
2017	2017 Super Music Awards Cyprus	Himself (host)	TV special
2017–2018	Greece's Got Talent	Himself (judge)	Season 5-6
2018–2019	As long as i have you	Tryfonas Parikleous	6 episodes
2021	The road to Tokyo: Team Hellas	Himself (host)	Sports talk show on ERT1; also creator, 59 episodes
2022–2025	Serres	Himself (writer)	20 episodes
2022	Serres	director	5 episodes
2023	The Numbers	Jorge Kapoutzidis	Episode: "Your world"
2025	One Future	Himself (host)	Saturday talk show on Skai TV
2025	In the Nick of Time - 20 Years Later	Spyros Deloglou, Himself (creator)	MEGA TV special
2026	Sing for Greece	Himself (host)	ERT1 TV special
