= Zafeiris Melas =

Greek singer (born 1952)

Zafeiris Melas Ζαφείρης Μελάς
- Born: Zafirios Mellas; Greek: Ζαφείριος Μελλάς; 13 October 1952 (age 74); Xanthi, Kingdom of Greece
- Origin: Greece
- Genres: Contemporary laïko, laïko
- Occupation: Singer
- Instrument: Vocals
- Years active: 1960–present
- Labels: Cosmos, Alpha Records, Lobby Music

Zafeiris Melas or Zafiris Melas (Greek: Ζαφείρης Μελάς) (born 13 October 1952) is a Greek contemporary pop-folk laïko singer.

He was born on 13 October 1952, in Xanthi to Romani parents and grew up in a poor neighbourhood. In his youth, he started performing in local groups of folkloric songs until he was noticed by the owners of the Cosmos recording company Antonis Stamboulis and Poly Vairemidi.

During his career, Melas made partnerships with many other famous Greek singers. including Manolis Angelopoulos, Vasilis Karras and Popi Maliotaki.

Melas lives in Greece with his wife Constantina, with whom he has three kids, Thodoris, Anna and Poly. During summertime he resides in Nea Plagia, Chalkidiki. He once expressed that his greatest secret that keeps him young are his two grandchildren, Zafeiris and Constantina. Notable colleagues of his include Vassilis Karras, Savvas Baltas and Antypas among others.

== Discography ==
- 1983 – Ας Αλλάξουμε Το Θέμα
- 1985 – Αναποφάσιστος
- 1987 – Περιμένοντας
- 1988 – Βασίλης Καρράς, Ζαφείρης Μελάς, Μάκης Καλατζής – Μια Βραδιά Στη Θεσσαλονίκη
- 1989 – Τα Φωτοστέφανα
- 1990 – Αφιέρωμα Στον Μανώλη
- 1991 – Ο Ίδιος Άνθρωπος
- 1992 – Μια Βραδιά Στη Σαλονίκη (Ζωντανή Ηχογράφηση)
- 1992 – Ο Καιρός Του Ζαφείρη
- 1993 – Βγες Απ' Το Μυαλό μου
- 1994 – Τα Παράπονά Μου
- 1996 – Θέλω Να Ζήσω
- 1997 – Βρέχει στη Θεσσαλονίκη
- 1998 – Επειγόντως
- 2000 – Όσο Περνάει Ο Καιρός
- 2001 – Melas Live
- 2002 – Best – Όλες Οι Επιτυχίες
- 2003 – Ζωή Παραμυθένια
- 2004 – Live Στην Θεσσαλονίκη
- 2005 – Ιδιωτική Εγγραφή
- 2005 – Μπαλάντες & Ζειμπέκικα
- 2005 – Ό,τι Καλύτερο Μες Τη Ζωή Μου
- 2006 – Τραγούδια Από Ζαφείρι – Ζαφείρης Μελάς Live
- 2007 – Live Οι Μεγάλες Επιτυχίες
- 2007 – Χίλια Αστέρια
- 2008 – Χρυσή Δισκοθήκη
- 2008 – Δημοτικά Τραγούδια Απ´ Όλη Την Ελλάδα
- 2009 – Μια Φωνή
- 2009 – Μελάς & Χριστοδουλόπουλος LIVE
- 2011 – Ο Τρελός Μου Χαρακτήρας
- 2013 – Στην Υγεία Σου
- 2016 – Γλέντι Με Τον Ζαφείρη Μελά

=== Single ===
- 2014 – Αγάπη Λάθος
- 2014 – Φίλοι (ντουέτα Τόνι Στοράρο)
- 2015 – Δεν Κάνω Πίσω
- 2016 – Χωρίς Εσένα
- 2016 – Ακόμα Σ' Αγαπάω
- 2017 – Επίλογος
- 2017 – Άϊντε Να Τελειώνουμε
- 2018 – Όνειρο Αν Είσαι
- 2018 – Χωρισμός
- 2019 – Στα Βαλκάνια
- 2020 – Γύρνα Χειμωνιάζει
- 2020 – Χαράματα
