= Angela Dimitriou =

Greek pop folk singer (born 1954)

Angela Dimitriou Άντζελα Δημητρίου
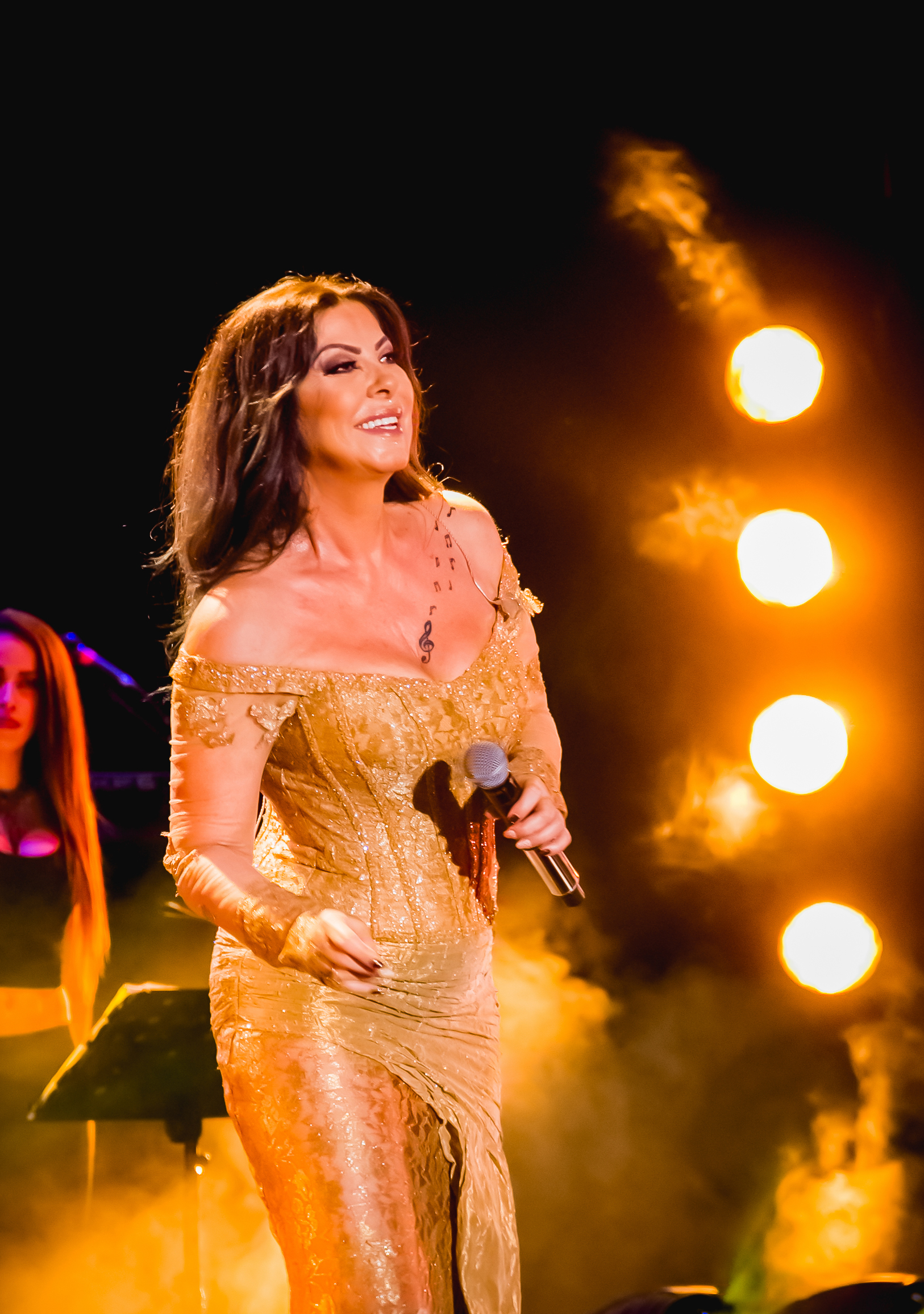

Background information
- Born: Angeliki Kiourtsaki; 14 August 1954 (age 72); Peristeri, Athens, Greece
- Genres: Greek Music, Laïko, Pop
- Occupations: Singer, show woman
- Years active: 1970–present
- Labels: Panivar (1978–80); MBI (1980–82); CBS-Sony Music Greece (1982–96); EMI (1996–2003); Alpha Records (2004–07); Lobby Music (2008–2019); Heaven Music (2019–present); Panik Records (2022–present)

Angeliki Kiourtsaki (Greek: Αγγελική Κιουρτσάκη; born 14 August 1954), known as Angela Dimitriou (Greek: Άντζελα Δημητρίου, pronounced [ˈandzela ðimiˈtri.u]), is a Greek singer. She is one of the top 10 most popular and commercially successful Greek female singers, with album sales reaching 1.5 million in Greece and 2.4 million internationally.

== Biography ==
Angela Dimitriou, born on 14 August 1954 in Peristeri, Attica, Greece, initially named Angeliki Kiourtsaki, faced financial difficulties from a young age, which led her to start working early in life and prevented her from completing her formal education.

In 1968, at the age of 14, she first appeared on stage after being discovered by an agent. Her career officially began in 1970 when she performed at the venue BETA VETA. In 1972, she adopted the name Angela Dimitriou. Throughout her career, she collaborated with notable Greek artists and signed contracts with various record labels, including CBS (now Sony Music), Minos EMI, Alpha Records, Lobby Music, and Heaven Music.

Angela Dimitriou's journey in the music industry continues to this day, with collaborations with renowned composers and artists. She has released 39 albums, with 30 going gold and 24 achieving platinum status, consistently achieving commercial success.

She gained popularity in Arab countries across the Middle East, where her song "Margarites" reached the top of the charts in Lebanon and other regions. Angela Dimitriou also collaborated with Egyptian singer Amr Diab on a song titled "Ana Bahebak Aktar." Both of these songs were produced by Vangelis Yannopoulos, the A&R manager of Minos-EMI Greece, through his connections with EMI Arabia. She also performed a Greek rendition of Marc Almond's song "Death's Diary," titled "Keravni ki Astrapes" (Lightnings and Thunders). However, she has faced criticism for her limited education and her humorous style of communication. Angela Dimitriou's most iconic and signature song is "Fotia Sta Savvatovrada" ("Fire on Saturday Nights"), which was produced by Yannis Doulamis, Sony Music's A&R manager. Her CD single Ah Patrida Mou went gold. On 14 March 2010, Alpha TV ranked Dimitriou the ninth top-certified female artist in the nation's phonographic era (since 1960).

== Discography ==
- 1979: Antzela Dimitriou
- 1980: Gia Ti Na 'rtheis Arga gold
- 1983: Oti Poume Metaxi Mas
- 1983: Mia Vradia Sta Bouzoukia No. 1
- 1984: Mia Vradia Sta Bouzoukia No. 2
- 1984: Peste Tou
- 1985: Poia Thisia - Gold platinum
- 1986: Dio Fones - Gold
- 1987: Kanonise To
- 1987: Mia Vradia Stin Fantasia No. 1 - Gold
- 1988: Mia Vradia Stin Fantasia No. 2
- 1988: Mia S'agapo Mia Se Miso gold
- 1989: Na Sou Orkisto - Gold
- 1990: Esi Ti Les - Platinum
- 1991: Exerountai - Platinum
- 1992: Fotia Sta Savvatovrada: 1982–1992 Deka Hronia Tragoudi - Double Platinum
- 1992: Kokkino Tis Fotias - Gold platinum
- 1993: Ftaiei O Erotas (CD single)
- 1993: Ftaiei O Erotas - Platinum
- 1994: Pes Afto Pou Theleis (first co operation with Foivos) - Gold platinum
- 1995: Gynaika Ego - Gold platinum
- 1996: Ektos Eleghou I Amartia
- 1996: Mi Mas Agapas - gold Platinum
- 1997: Ta Zeibekika Tis Antzelas
- 1998: 100% - Gold platinum
- 1999: Margarites (CD single)
- 1999: Kane Stin Akri - Gold platinum
- 2000: Mavri Lista - Gold platinum
- 2001: Hilia Prosopa
- 2002: Ti Na Ta Kano Afta Pou Eho (CD single)
- 2002: Opou Me Paei I Kardia gold
- 2004: Kyria Me Gnorises, Kyria Tha Meino...Live gold
- 2004: Gia Sena (CD single)
- 2004: The Best Of Antzela Dimitriou
- 2004: Pios Eisai
- 2005: S'eho?
- 2006: Oxygono + Live
- 2007: Ah! Patrida Mou - Gold
- 2007: Ta' Da Ola gold
- 2008: Ftaine Oi Antres
- 2010: Gyalina Ftera gold
- 2011: Meine Ekei - Gold
- 2013: Come Back - gold Platinum
- 2015: Standard gold platinum

=== Singles ===
- 2014: Apo 'do Kai Pera (cd single)
- 2016: Oti Mou Anikei (cd single)
- 2016: Anexartiti (cd single)
- 2017: An Nyhtosei (cd single)
- 2018: An Eiha Enan Anthropo (cd single)
- 2018: De M' Aggizei I Krisi (cd single)
- 2019: Patera Na 'Souna Edo (cd single)
- 2019: Kita Me (cd single)
- 2020: Vale Rdio (cd single)
- 2020: Tha Synehiso (cd single)
- 2020: Vges (Single)

== Filmography ==
=== Film ===
Year	Title	Role	Notes	Ref.
1982	Blue Jeans and Leather Jacket	Herself	Film debut	
1982	His big ears	Herself		
1983	Teacher, what did you teach?	Herself		
1983	The person of the day is wanted	Herself		
1983	Papasouzas	Herself		
1983	The rape of a nun	Herself		
1984	The sweet-liar	Herself		
1985	Naked scandals	Herself	Video movie	
1986	The wife, the Pontius lover and the video	Herself	Video movie	
1987	The bluff	Herself	Video movie	
1987	I am Pontius, I do what I want	Herself		
1987	Gaga	Angie	Video movie	
1988	Angela the temptation	Angela Hot	Video movie	
1988	The widow was dressed in red	Herself	Video movie	
1988	Beauty Pageant '88	Angela Dimitriou	Video movie	

=== Television ===
Year	Title	Role(s)	Notes
1979	Louna Park	singer	1 episode
1991	Policeman Thanasis Papathanasis	traffic policeman	Episode: "Who will take this Easter?"
1992	Greece you can get qualified	Herself	Episode: "Greece you can rise up"
1992	Alithos Anesti	Herself	TV special
1992	The Sheepfold TV Presents	Herself (host)	TV special
1992	The Backuuria	Herself	Episode: "Merry Backouria Christmas"
1993	Anastasia	Herself	4 episodes
1996	Cheek to Cheek	Herself	1 episode
2005	Al Tsantiri News	Herself (guest)	1 episode
2005-2006	All star fame	Herself (judge)	Talent show
2009-2010	Zamanfu	Herself (judge)	Talent show
2022-2023	Just the 2 Of Us	Herself (coach)	Season 6; 12 episodes
2023	At Home with MEGA with Angela Dimitriou	Herself	Episode 13; season 4
2024	Just the 2 Of Us	Herself (coach)	Season 8; 4 episodes
