= Christos Zacharopoulos =

Christos Zacharopoulos (Greek: Χρήστος Ζαχαρόπουλος) was the winner of the first season of Greece's Got Talent.

He participated in the fourth season of The X Factor Greece and reached the four chair challenge, but he was eliminated by his mentor Giorgos Theofanous. One year later, Giorgos Theofanous created the boyband TAG, consisting by Zacharopoulos and other three members of Theofanous team, two of them eliminated at the four chair challenge and one of them reached the live shows.
