= Maria Bakodimou =

Greek television presenter

Maria Bakodimou (Μαρία Μπακοδήμου) is a Greek television personality, talk show presenter and fashion designer. She co-hosted the National Final to select the Greek representative in the Eurovision Song Contest 2007. She had her own talk show with Fotis Sergoulopoulos in TV, which was called "Fotis & Maria Live".

Her cousin is the Greek-French journalist and entertainer Nikos Aliagas.

From 2017, Maria was selected to be one of the judges of Ellada Eheis Talento alongside Giorgos Kapoutzidis and Sakis Tanimanidis.

From 2018 she presents the dating reality show of Skai TV 'Power of Love'.

== Filmography ==
=== Film ===
Year	Title	Role	Notes	Ref.
1999	Female Company	singer	Film debut	
2003	Liza and all the others	magazine manager		
2008	Just Broke Up	Titika Karlatera		
2011	Loafing and Camouflage: Sirens at Land	Maria Bakodimou		
2017	Success Story	Anna		

=== Television ===
Year	Title	Role(s)	Notes
1991	Almanac '91	Katina Karabourbouridou	TV special
1991-1992	ET2 Hours Together	Gela Karnava	Series regular, 6 episodes
1992-1993	What a mess on Saturday!	various roles	26 episodes; also co-writer
1998-1999	Behave Yourself	Herself (host)	Tabloid talk show; season 3
1999-2003	Make yourself at home!	Herself (host)	Daytime morning talk show; also co-creator
2000	2000 Pop Corn Music	Herself (host)	TV special
2000	What Soul Will You Deliver, You Fool Woman?	Aglaia	1 episode
2002	2001 Arion Music Awards	Herself (host)	TV special
2003	2002 Arion Music Awards	Herself (host)	TV special
2003-2004	By word of mouth	Herself (host)	Late night talk show on MEGA; also co-creator
2004	2003 Arion Music Awards	Herself (host)	TV special
2004	The Nanny	Herself	1 episode
2004-2006	I Love TV	Herself (host)	Late night talk show on MEGA; also co-creator
2005	2005 Prosopa Greek Television Awards	Herself (host)	TV special
2006-2008	TV Tiglon	Herself (host)	Late night talk show on ALPHA; also co-creator
2007	2007 Greek Eurovision Finals	Herself (host)	TV special
2007	Eurovision Song Contest	Herself (commentator)	TV special
2007	Loafing and Camouflage: The Series	Herself	1 episode
2008-2009	Take it easy, don't sit down and run away!	Herself (host)	Daytime talk show on ALPHA; also co-creator
2009	2008 Status Awards - Men of the year	Herself (host)	TV special
2009-2016	Fotis & Maria Live	Herself (host)	Daytime talk show on STAR; also co-cretor
2010	2009 Status Awards - Men of the year	Herself (host)	TV special
2017-2018	Greece's Got Talent	Herself (judge)	Season 5-6
2018-2019	Power of Love	Herself (host)	Trash television; season 1-2
2019-2020	One for all!	Herself (host)	Daytime game show on OPEN
2020-2022	Just the 2 Of Us	Herself (judge)	Season 3-5
2020-2021	Style me up	Herself (host)	Reality television; season 1
2022-2024	Hello! with Maria Bakodimou	Herself (host)	Weekend talk show on SKAI; also creator
2023	My Style Rocks	Herself (guest judge)	Episode 112; season 5
2023	2023 Madame Figaro Awards - Women of the Year	Herself (host)	TV special
2026	The Weakest Link	Herself (host)	Daytime game show on OPEN; season 7
