= Ellada Eheis Talento season 2 =

Ellada Eheis Talento
- Season 2
- Hosted by: Christos Ferentinos
- Judges: Ilias Psinakis; Matthildi Maggira; Vaggelis Perris
- Winner: Kiss Madiam
- Runner-up: Maurikios Maurikiou

Release
- Original network: ANT1
- Original release: 24 April – 3 July 2009

Season chronology
- ← Previous; Season 1 Next → Season 3

The 2009 season of Ellada Eheis Talento is the second season of the programme presented by Christos Ferentinos with judges Ilias Psinakis, Matthildi Maggira and Vaggelis Perris. It began airing on ANT1 on 24 April and concluded on 3 July.
