= Nikiforos (Greek singer) =

Greek singer

Nikephoros
- Born: Νικηφόρος Βιθούλκας; May 24, 1988 (age 38); Athens, Greece
- Occupations: Singer; musician; composer
- Years active: 2009–present

Nikephoros Vithoulkas (Greek: Νικηφόρος Βιθούλκας, born 24 May 1988) known as simply Nikephoros is a Greek singer and songwriter.

== Biography ==
=== Early life ===
Nikephoros Vithoulkas was born on 24 May 1988 in Athens, Greece. He studied in the University of Patra.

=== Career ===
Vithoulkas participated in the second season of the Greek version of The X Factor where he was under the mentorship of Nikos Mouratidis and he came 8th place (eliminated week 9). He secured a recording contract with Heaven Music and he released his debut album "Iposhesou" (2010). In winter of 2011 he appeared in the nightclub Votanikos along with Giorgos Mazonakis, Vegas and Paola Foka. The following year he released a single called "Mi mou les pos m'agapas" (2012) and a duet with the lead singer of Vegas, Melina Makr under the name "Kano Kiklous" (2012). He also released his song "Trelos" (2013) and he completed the recording of his second full album titled "Ta logia kaigontai". He released his last single for now with title "Ftano Sto Theo" (2013). In summer of 2013 he sang in Mad Video Music Awards 2013 and he was in top 50 of 2013 without getting a prize.

== Discography ==
=== Studio albums ===
- 2010: Iposhesou
- 2013: Ta Logia Kegonte
- 2016: Best Of
- 2020: Ine Pou Niotho

=== Singles ===
- "Iposhesou" (2010)
- "Mi Mou Les Pos M'agapas" (2011)
- "Kano Kiklous" (2012)
- "Trelos" (2012)
- "Ftano Sto Theo" (2013)
- "Erotevmenos Ime" (2013)
- "Eretevmenos Ime - Silentman Remix" (2014)
- "Krima Pou S'agapisa" (2014)
- "Monos Mou" (2014)
- "Edo Sta Diskola" (2015)
- "Apopse Teleioses" (2015)
- "Volta" (2016)
- "San Ta Matia Sou" (2016)
- "Aspro Pato" (2017)
- "O Andras Pou Ksereis" (2018)
- "San Alitis" (2018)
- "Ksero Ti Kano" (2018)
- "Eho Ta Dika Mou" (2019)
- "Ta leme to vradi"(2019)
- "Einai Pou Niotho" (2020)
- "Mia Nihta Thelo Mono" (2021)
- "Pes/Se" (2021)
- "Zo I Eho Pethani" (2022)
- "Pes Mou Pou Tha Me Pas" (2022)
