= Alpha Records (Greek company) =

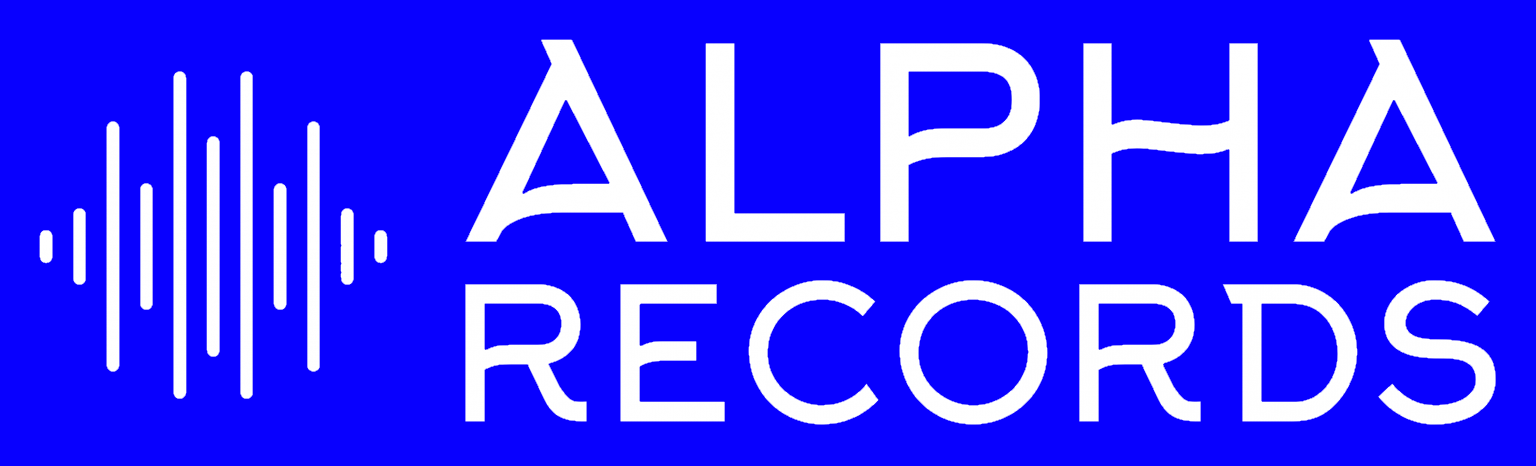
- Founded: 1987
- Distributor(s): Mousiko Tahidromio
- Country of origin: Greece
- Location: Athens
- Official website: www.alpharecords.gr

The 'AM' is a record company, headquartered in Athens, Greece, founded in 1987 by the family Markogiannis while later renamed 'Alpha Records' . The potential was great names of Greek song at times.

== Overview ==
In September 1999, the AM acquired by the group Vardinoyannis and renamed Alpha Records. The last discs released as a record company AM in 1999.

== Artists ==
The following artists belonged or belong to potential Alpha Records.

- Stelios Kazantzidis (died)
- Stamatis Gonidis
- Katerina Stanisi
- Angela Dimitriou
- Dimitris Kontolazos
- Christos Menidiatis
- Labis Livieratos
- Popi Maliotaki
- Lefteris Pantazis
- Giorgos Alkaios
- Aggelos Dionysiou
- Lena Papadopoulou
- Chrispa
- Tolis Voskopoulos
- Zafeiris Melas
- Mando
- Nikos Karvelas
- Antzy Samiou
- Alekos Zazopoulos
- Dimitris Kokotas
- Pitsa Papadopoulou
- Vasilis Terlegkas
- Katy Livanou
- Triantaphyllos
- Eri Zora
- Sabrina
- Eudokia

== Logos ==
1999-2002	2002-2020	2020-present	"Alpha Mark" label 2020-present
