= Ilias Psinakis =

Greek politician, manager, and television personality

- Ηλίας Ψινάκης

Mayor of Marathon
- In office 1 September 2014 – 23 May 2019
- Preceded by: Iordanis Louizos
- Succeeded by: Ioannis Zagaris

Municipal Councillor of Athens
- In office 1 January 2011 – 31 August 2014

Personal details
- Born: 8 April 1958 (age 68) Athens, Greece
- Party: Independent
- Education: Lycée Léonin
- Profession: Politician; businessman

Ilias Psinakis (Greek: Ηλίας Ψινάκης; born 8 April 1958) is a Greek politician, businessman, manager, and television personality who served as mayor of Marathon from 2014 to 2019.

== Early life and education ==
Psinakis was born in Greece to Panagiotis and Alice Psinakis. His father owned an electronics factory and his uncle Steve Psinakis owned the energy supplier company Meralco in Philippines. He grew up in Philippines and Greece. While attending university in the United Kingdom, Psinakis studied international business and marketing, eventually receiving master's degrees in both.

== Career ==
=== Modeling and entertainment ===
Early in his career pursuits, Psinakis worked as a fashion model. After modeling, Psinakis went on to work as a writer for a Greek television series. His next career move was as manager for the Greek singer Sakis Rouvas. After his 16-year working relationship with Rouvas ended in 2004, Psinakis decided to manage his own entertainment career, later appearing as a judge on Greek television reality shows such as Super Idol, Dream Show, Greece's Got Talent (Greek:Ελλάδα Έχεις Ταλέντο), The X Factor. During this time period, Psinakis continued to work as a manager for several singers and actors in Greece.

=== Politics ===
==== Municipal councillor of Athens (2011-2014) ====
In 2010, Psinakis began his political involvement when elected to the Athens city council alongside Nikitas Kaklamanis. In addition to working to promote a favorable image of Athens in Greece and abroad, Psinakis initiated and supported the project "For a Plate of Food" designed to provide assistance to the poor in Athens. Organised in collaboration with the Archdiocese of Athens and the government organization "Apostoli", thousands of Athens' needy were provided free food and assistance.

==== Mayor of Marathon (2014-2019) ====
Psinakis became a candidate for Mayor of the Municipality of Marathon in 2014. A resident there for more than twenty years at the time of his candidacy, the area's citizens elected him for the position in the first voting round on 18 May 2014 with 53.55% of the total vote. Psinakis was sworn into office in August 2014. During his inauguration speech, the new mayor gave his vision for Marathon and the surrounding region that included a focus on transparency, meritocracy and development.

On 3 August 2018, following the disastrous fires in the region, the municipal council of Marathon passed unanimously a resolution characterising Psinakis "undesirable", "incapable" and "extremely dangerous even to the physical health of the municipality's citizens", and demanding his resignation. Psinakis refused to resign, characterising the action as planned unconstitutional procedure that is not provided for by law and has no legal precedent. According to him it only had purpose of "spoofing and anthropophagy". Instead of politicking, he urged to manage the consequences of this disaster in a climate of solidarity and joint effort.

===== Projects and activities =====
In early 2015, Psinakis was appointed head of international public relations for the Central Union of Municipalities (KEDE). In his association with the appointment, Psinakis has worked to return the Parthenon Marbles, also known as the Elgin Marbles, to Greece from the British Museum in London. Psinakis' other activities as mayor include participation in the Hellenic Parliament.

In an effort to honor on Greek athletes, celebrities, philanthropists, entertainers, and other notable individuals internationally, Psinakis created the Medal of the Legion of Marathon in 2015. In May of that year, Psinakis presented the first of this award to the President of the Hellenic Republic Prokopis Pavlopoulos. Subsequent recipients of the award have been Ecumenical Patriarch Bartholomew, Hollywood director James Cameron, Jim Gianopulos of 20th Century Fox, actors Tom Hanks and Rita Wilson, and thirty-seven foreign ambassadors from around the world. Recipients of the award are given the title "World Ambassador of Marathon".

Psinakis established the non-profit Marathon Foundation in order to further tourism, sports, and culture in the region as well as promote charitable events for the needy that provide food, water and medical care throughout Greece.

In an effort to unite the various regions of Greece containing antiquities as well as historical and cultural landmarks, Psinakis established the Amphictyony of Ancient Greek Cities (Greek: Αμφικτυονία Αρχαίων Ελληνικών Πόλεων) in March 2016. Headquartered in Marathon, the focus of the association is protection and propagation of Greek cultural heritage and support of cultural interests. Since its inception, numerous municipalities in Greece have become member cities.

In an effort to revitalize Marathon, Psinakis has worked with Greek and Chinese investors to create a Riviera-style attraction and international tourist destination. Part of Psinakis' plan for Marathon's future is constructing an entertainment center that includes a casino, marina, hotels, villas, and a golf course. Additional plans by Psinakis for Marathon are for Marathon Lake, a park that would include boating as well as bike jogging trails paths. In cooperation with the Regional Governor of Attica, the culture minister, and the mayor of Lavrio, Psinakis is also working on a scuba diving park that would be centered around the Evian Gulf. Other efforts toward making his city a tourist destination include a trip made by Psinakis to China in May 2016, where he took part in investment negotiations for the construction of a history museum in Marathon.

== Filmography ==
=== Television ===
Year	Title	Role(s)	Notes
1992-1993	The Bachelors	Himself (writer)	Sitcom (19 episodes)
1994-1995	Someone to take care of her	Himself (writer)	Romance tv series (23 episodes)
1995	Anna Vissi with Love	Himself (writer)	Variety talk show
1995	Either way	Himself (writer)	Sitcom (17 episodes)
2004	Super Idol	Himself (judge)	Talent show; season 1
2004	The bees	Himself	1 episode
2004-2007	Dream Show	Himself (judge)	Talent show; season 1-3
2006	Distraction	Himself (host)	Game show; season 1
2007-2010	Greece's Got Talent	Himself (judge)	Season 1-3
2007-2008	TV Stars: Let's present yourselves	Himself (judge)	Talent show
2008	Show Sexy	Himself (judge)	Talent show (6 episodes)
2008	Seven Deadly Mothers-In-Law	Himself	Episode: "The Mother-In-Law from Paros"
2010	Beautiful World in the Morning	Himself (host)	Episode: "June 4, 2010"
2011-2012	Fab 5	Himself (host)	Reality show
2021–present	Nursing Home with Ilias Psinakis	Himself (host)	Reality talk show; also creator and producer
2022	The X Factor Greece	Himself (judge)	Live shows; Season 7
2023	Mercy! with Ilias Psinakis and Annita Pania	Himself (host)	Late night talk show
2024	Just the 2 Of Us	Himself (guest judge)	Live 10; Season 8
