= Popi Malliotaki =

Greek singer

Popi Malliotaki Πόπη Μαλλιωτάκη Πόπη Μαλλιωτάκη
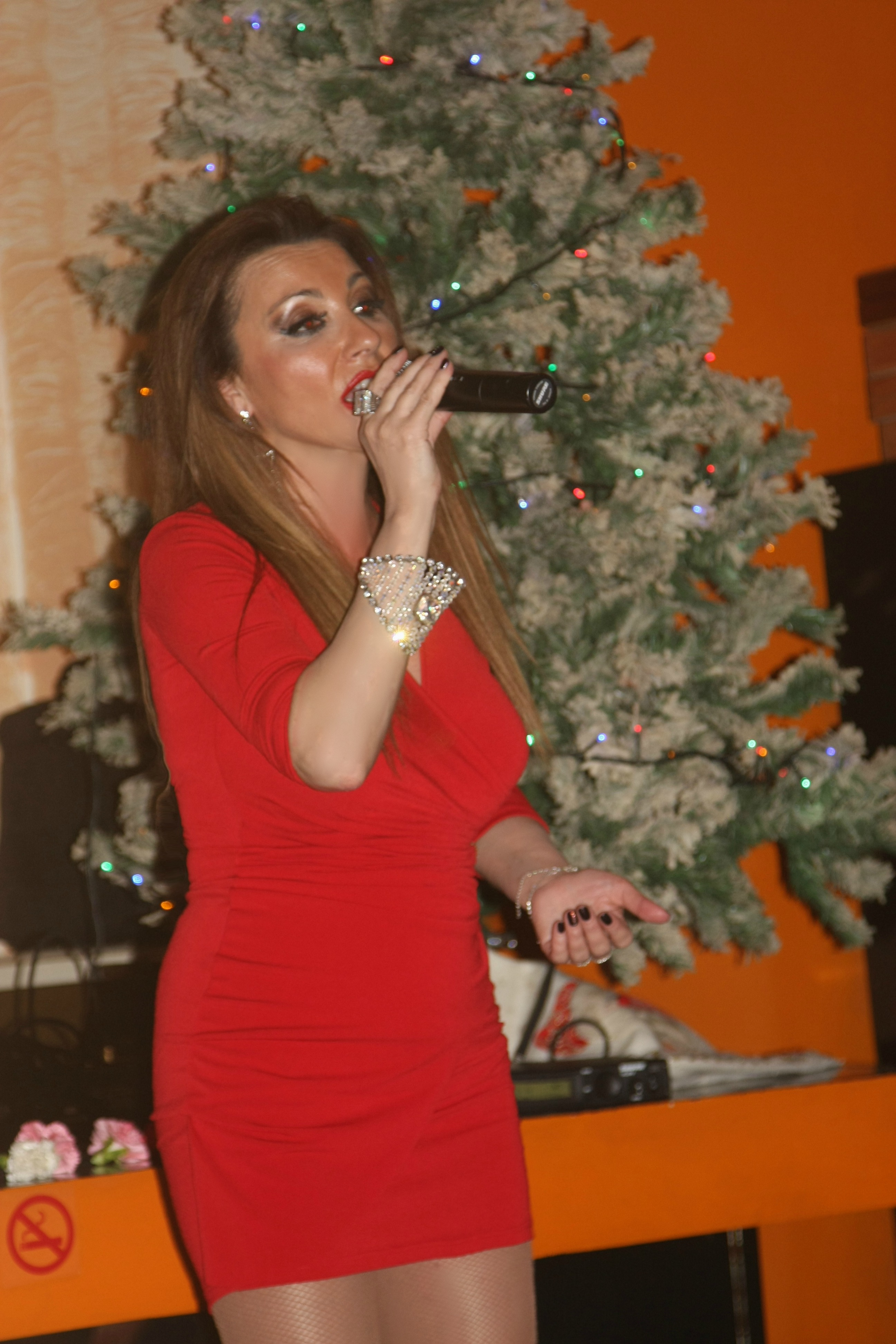
- Malliotaki singing at a club in Athens

Background information
- Born: Calliope Malliotaki; Greek: Πόπη Μαλλιωτάκη; 16 October 1971 (age 55); Ierapetra, Crete, Greece
- Genres: Greek Music, Laika, Folk, Slight Folk
- Occupation: Singer
- Years active: 1990–present
- Labels: Alpha Records (Greek company) (2005–2008); Lobby Music (2012–2013) Heaven Music (2018)

Popi Malliotaki (Greek: Πόπη Μαλλιωτάκη; born 16 October 1971) is a Greek pop-folk singer.

== Biography ==
She studied nursing in Heraklion Crete and worked as a Nurse while at the same time she sang in nightclubs. After eight months she decided to abandon the nursing and deal exclusively with the music. She has collaborated with many artists, such as: Paschalis Terzis, Yannis Ploutarchos, Katerina Stanisi, Antipas, Vasilis Karras, Yannis Kapsalis, Kostas Bigalis, Vasilis Terlegas, Sophia Vossou, Dimitris Kontolazos, Mary Linda, Stathis Angelopoulos, Giannis Vogiatzis, Spiros Zagoraios, Giorgos Mazonakis, Tzeni Vanou, Dakis, Rita Sakellariou, Nikos Kourkoulis, Zafeiris Melas, Vasilis Paiteris, and Lefteris Pantazis. She has released three albums and several singles. She counts more than 20 years in the field of the song.

== Personal life ==
She has been married twice. From her first marriage with singer Sakis Galanis has a daughter and the name of the daughter is Rania. In 1992, she met the owner of nightclubs Babis Lazaridis in Germany. They fell madly in love and married in 1999 in Athens. From her second marriage with businessman Babis Lazaridis has a son, the model, journalist and blogger Vasilis Lazaridis. On 13 December 2008, Babis Lazaridis was murdered by unidentified men in the area Voula.

=== 2005: "Aparetiti agapi mou" ===
In 2005, Popi Maliotaki signs contract with Alpha Records and released her first album titled Aparetiti Agapi Mou . The music on the album signed by Elias Tryfonides and lyrics by Rania Tikou. Popi Maliotaki and Haris Akritidis they interpret together duet "Aparetiti Agapi Mou". The song Me ragises was distinguished and later shot as video clip with the directorial guidance of the famous director George Gavalos. Although nascent, Popi Maliotaki succeeded with her first personal album to conquer the 13th place for a week in the period 13/6 to 06/19/05 in the official index of the Greek music market of the IFPI TOP 50 songs for the Greek repertoire.

=== 2006: "Alli mia fora" ===
At the beginning of 2006, released the second album entitled Alli mia fora . Among the successful songs of the album, the songs: "Alli mia fora", "Erotas isouna", "Amartimata" and "Gineka monadiki". Surprise in the album is the duet with Popi Maliotaki and the presenter Maria Bekatorou. In the summer of 2007, the album becomes gold from Yiasoo.com.

=== 2007-2008: "Popara" ===
At the end of 2007, Popi Maliotaki completes and releases his third consecutive album entitled Popara . The satirical song "Popara" interpreted in 6 different languages and 3 version to answer in this way, at satire which had been brought by Lakis Lazopoulos through the broadcast "Al Tsantiri Niouz". The song was a great success from the early days of release and she gained wide recognition and popularity to the public in a very short time..

In 2008, after the great success of the third album entitled "Popara", she collaborated with mobile operator "Helen Q Card" and released calling card with name "Popara" which was the title of their third album. which is the title of the last album.

=== 2013-2014: "Ta xanaleme" – "Ta thelo mou" ===
After a long absence of several years from the discography, but not of the music stages and the end of the collaboration with the record company Alpha Records, Popi Maliotaki returns with a single of called Ta xanaleme, which is released by new record label, Lobby Music. The single contains the songs "Ta xanaleme", "Tha se timoriso" and "Iparhi Theos", at lyrics by Nektarios Bitros, Mentoras and Zoe Grypari and music by Petros Dragoumis and Nikos Georgopoulos. In the song "Ta xanaleme", where is the title of the single she is singing featuring with rapper Mentoras.

In 2014, Popi Maliotaki released the single entitled "Ta thelo mou" with music of the single by Panos Roumeliotis and lyrics by Mary Antonaki.

=== 2015-2016: "I epityhia" – "Ekanes ti diafora" – "An m' agapas" ===
In 2015 she released the single «I epityhia» with lyrics of the single by Popi Maliotaki and music by Panos Roumeliotis, and then she released the single "Ekanes ti diafora" with lyrics by Dimitris Dimitras and music by Panos Roumeliotis from Music Liberty. In 2016 releases her new single entitled "An m' agapas" with lyrics by Elena Maniati and music by Vangelis Panatos from E & E Music Production. The song "An m' agapas" visualized shortly after its release by Dimitris Kabas and Maliotaki surprised us in her new clip because in video clip he has participate her son, Vasilis.

=== 2018 – 2019: "De horizoun oi kardies mas" – "Thema epafis" ===
In 2018, she signed a contract with the recording company Heaven Music and released the single De horizoun oi kardies mas in the lyrics of Panos Falaras and music by Akis Diximos. The video clip is directed by Dimitris Kampas. In May 2019, the song "Thema epafis", which is in Latin rhythms, was released by Heaven Music. The lyrics bears the signature of Panos Falaras, while the music of Akis Diximos.

=== 2020 – 2021: "To klidi tou feggariou" – "Arga i grigora" ===
In 2020, Popi Maliotaki collaborated for the third time with Panos Falaras and Akis Diximos on the song To klidi tou feggariou, which was released on 22 December by Heaven Music along with the video clip. In December 2021, Malliotaki released her fourth single in a row from Heaven Music, the dance adaptation "Arga i grigora" to music by Valadis and lyrics by Panos Falaras, along with the video clip.

=== 2025 – 2026: "Escapers Travel Reality" – "Tha Trelenome" ===
Since October 2025, she has been presenting the travel reality show "Escapers" with her son Vasilis Lazaridis, which is broadcast on their YouTube channel, on 18 regional television stations across Greece as well as on Cosmote TV via the television stations. In July 2026, she renewed her collaboration with Heaven Music and released her fifth single in a row on the label, titled "Tha Trelenome", along with the video clip. It is a dance tsifteteli, with lyrics and music by Christos Palantzas.

== Discographies ==
=== Albums ===
- 2005 Aparetiti agapi mou (feat. Haris Akritidis)
- 2006 Alli mia fora
- 2007 Popara

=== Singles ===
- 2013 Ta xanaleme (feat. Mentoras)
- 2014 Ta thelo mou
- 2015 I epityhia
- 2016 Ekanes ti diafora
- 2016 An m' agapas
- 2018 De horizoun oi kardies mas
- 2019 Thema epafis
- 2020 To klidi tou feggariou
- 2021 Arga i grigora
- 2026 Tha Trelenome

=== Video Clips ===
- 2005 Me ragises
- 2006 Alli mia fora
- 2006 Etsi nomizis (feat. Maria Bekatorou)
- 2007 Popara
- 2013 Ta xanaleme (feat. Mentoras)
- 2014 Ta thelo mou
- 2015 I epitihia
- 2016 An m' agapas
- 2018 De horizoun oi kardies mas
- 2019 Thema epafis
- 2020 To klidi tou feggariou
- 2021 Arga i grigora
- 2026 Tha Trelenome
