= Giorgos Papadopoulos (singer) =

Greek Cypriot singer (born 1985)

- Born: 26 May 1985 (age 41); Nicosia, Cyprus
- Genres: pop music
- Occupations: Singer, songwriter
- Instrument: Vocals
- Years active: 2003–present
- Labels: All Records Cyprus, Virus Music Greece

Giorgos Papadopoulos is a Greek Cypriot singer who began his career in Cyprus. After three successful EPs he released his first album in both Greek and Cypriot markets and started gaining popularity in Greece as well. He has worked with Anna Vissi, Christos Dantis, Nama, Constantinos Christoforou, Christos Thiveos, Helena Paparizou, and others.

== Early life ==
Giorgos Papadopoulos was born in Nicosia, Cyprus, on May 26, 1985, to Greek Cypriot parents. His involvement in music started at a very young age and when he was 14 years old he formed his first musical group called "Εξ Επαφής" that performed at school and charity events. He also received various awards distinctions in music competitions.

== Discography ==
- Sto Vitho (2003)

First EP, released only in Cyprus. Reached Gold status. The lead single was a composition by popular Greek composer Christos Dantis. The song was later included in Dantis live album performed by himself.

- Sose Me (2004)

The second EP, also only released in Cyprus, also achieving Gold status. Lead single was presented during Anna Vissi sold-out concert in Nicosia, Cyprus before reaching No. 1 in Cypriot airplay.

- Se Pethimisa (2006)

Papadopoulos final release with All Records Cyprus, was this third EP. The lead single Kati Mou Leei was another No. 1 hit for Papadopoulos composed by Constantinos Christoforou. The song was later covered by Christoforou himself on his 2009 album Alios.

- Thalasses (2008)

Papadopoulos debut album and first release in Greece after he joined Virus Records. The album featured 13 all-new songs. Three singles were taken off the original release, that being Ochi (No), a top 20 hit in Greece and No. 1 in Cyprus, Ta Psichologika Mou and Thalasses (another top 20 hit in Greece).

In 2009 the album was re-released in two editions. The first was a 2-CD box set featuring the original release package and a bonus disc Soma Me Soma with 4 bonus songs and 4 video clips. The second edition is a CD+DVD set with the CD containing all 13 songs from the original release + the 4 bonus songs from Soma Me Soma and a DVD with the 4 video clips. The 4 bonus songs were new top 20 single Soma Me Soma, Gia Tin Agapi Sou the official soundtrack of the TV-series of Ant1 Cyprus with the same name (already a big hit in Cyprus) and a top 30 hit in Greece, Sose Me from the 2004 EP and Maybe a cover of Ochi in English. The 4 video clips were: Ochi, Ta Psichologika Mou, Thalasses and Gia Tin Agapi Sou. In June 2010 the album was certified 2× Platinum in Greece.

- Mazi Mou Se Thelo (2010)

In March 2010 his second album was released titled "Mazi Mou Se Thelo (I Want You With Me)". First single off the album was the song "Min Svinis Ta Fota" which reached top 20 in Greece and number one in Cyprus. The second single from the album is "Ti Na Protothimitho" which also reached number one in Cyprus. The album was certified Gold in Greece.

- Ola Sto Kokkino (2012)

In Autumn 2011 it was announced that a new album was in the works to be released by December 2011. An official presentation of the album took place and the first single of the album was presented. The official released date was beginning of January 2012. But a strike at his record company and a further closure of it delayed the release. A second single was released in Spring 2012, and the third single of the album was released in June 2012. Immediately after the album was finally released, this time from the record company Heaven Music, it reached top 10 of the official IFPI album charts. His fourth single off the album was released in September 2012.

== Songwriting career ==
Giorgos Papadopoulos is an active songwriter, having written songs for many popular Greek artists, including Helena Paparizou, Giorgos Mazonakis, Tamta, Kostas Martakis, Panos Kiamos, Kaiti Garbi, Melina Aslanidou and Notis Sfakianakis, among others.
