= Ble (band) =

- Origin: Greece
- Genres: Pop, rock
- Years active: 1996–present
- Labels: Minos EMI
- Website: http://www.ble.gr/

Ble (Greek: Μπλε, romanized: Mple , literally Blue) is a Greek pop rock band, formed in 1996 by George Papapostolou (guitar, sax, vocals, music) and George Parodis (lyrics). Theodosia Tsatsou (lead vocals) and Natasa Alexiou (backing vocals, violin) completed the current lineup of the band in 1996. The name Ble (Μπλε in Greek) means blue. Their music is characterised by their dark and introspective album, Enohes.

In 1997, Theodosia Tsatsou left the band and Ble continued successfully with a new singer, Georgia Kefala, who still remains the lead singer of the band.

The group has released six studio albums: Enohes (1996), Ble (1998), Ela Na Deis (2000), Sta Mavra Eho Ntithei (2002), Etsi Thelo Ego Na Zo (2004) and Oneira Sou Tragoudao (2006). In 2009 they released Ble 1996–2009 compilation (Best Of). The band had success with "Niotho Enohes" from their first single and "Fovame" from the album Enohes, which became a hit single in 1996. Ble's second album, Ble, featured a harder and heavier sound. Their third album, Ela Na Deis, was released in 2000. Since then, they released three more albums with success in the Greek charts.

== History ==
=== 1995–1997: Origins and formation ===
In December 1995, George Papapostolou proposed to his friend and old schoolmate George Parodis to join his band, which he called for the first time "Ble". Parodis accepted and together they started looking for a singer. They came across Theodosia Tsatsou, who became the frontwoman of the band. Natasa Alexiou completed the band's line up soon after and Ble recorded their first demos. A few months later, Ble signed their first contract with Virgin Records.

In November 1996, Ble released their first album, Enohes. The album became a commercial success. The band had success with "Enohes", "Fovame" and "Esi Den Zeis Pouthena" and the album was classified as platinum. The single "Kola Koka" was a collaboration with Antonis Kanakis and Sotiris Kalivatsis, two TV hosts and actors in Greece. As a result of the buzz generated in Greece, many bands started to follow Ble's example, which, apart from the huge success they had, was the first band in Greece with a female lead vocal singer. Record companies at the time were influenced by Ble's success, reconsidered their attitude towards new bands and became more responsive to innovative efforts assemblies. Ble played at numerous clubs and festivals which helped add to their growing fanbase at the time. The album Enohes was classified gold with 18 months in the Top 50 of the official Greek IFPI chart.

In early 1997, Theodosia Tsatsou announced her decision to leave the band and follow a solo career.

=== 1998–2000: Ble ===
In November 1997, Ble returned with their second studio album Ble, with George Papapostolou on the lead vocals along with a new singer Georgia Kefala.

=== 2000–2002: Ela Na Deis ===
Ble's third album, Ela Na Deis, was released in November 2000. The first single from the album was "Kokkino Fili" which was released early that summer and became the soundtrack of a well-known advertising campaign in Greece. Ble collaborated with Filippos Pliatsikas from the band Pyx Lax for the track "Pote Min Les Pote". The tracks "Mes Ston Ipno Sou Milas" and "Trelos" reached Number 1 and they are still part of Ble's set list on their live shows. At the time, the band won numerous awards (Best Greek Band – Arion, Best Greek Rock Band – Pankorfiaka, etc.) and toured extensively all over Greece.

=== 2002–2004: "Piano Fotia" ===
In May 2002, Ble released their fourth studio album Sta Mavra Eho Ntithei. The album produced two singles: "Piano Fotia" and "Den Thelo". "Piano Fotia" reached number one in the Greek chart for months and became probably the biggest hit of the band. On the album they worked with Giannis Savvidakis who performed on the track "Thimamai". On October 20, 2002, Ble performed at Club 22, Athens while, later that month they appeared in Gialino Mousiko Theatre, Athens, with Nikos Ziogalas and Eleni Peta.

In March 2003, George Papapostolou and Giorgios Parodis work with Elena, a new singer, on her album, while Giorgia wrote the lyrics of three tracks. In April 2003, Ble attended the Arion Music Awards, where they performed "Piano Fotia" and "Den Thelo". The band won the award for Best Group 2002. In May 2003, Ble started their summer tour all over Greece. In November, they started a collaboration with Giannis Savvidakis and C:Real in Avaton Live, while at the same period they released the CD-single "Den Xereis Poso", which reached number 6 in the Greek chart.

=== 2004–2006: Etsi Thelo Ego Na Zo ===
In September 2004, Giorgia sang for the Greek soundtrack on Disney's film, Home on the Range.

Ble released their fifth album Etsi Thelo Ego Na Zo in December 2004 while some months earlier, in November, they released the promo single for this album, "Koitaxe Me Duo Fores". In February 2005, the video clip for the track "Koitaxe Me Duo Fores" was broadcast on MAD TV and on 15 March 2004, Ble won two nominations for the Arion Music Awards: Best Greek Band and Best Alternative Band. That same period, they collaborated with Evridiki on her album, Sto Idio Vagoni, with Giorgia having a duet, named "Mono Esena" with Evridiki. In April, Ble released their second video clip for the track "Mi Me Akous". Their live appearances during the summer of 2005 were numerous with the one in Nestorio River Festival with Lakis Papadopoulos on 4 August 2005 and the one in Coca-Cola Soundwave Festival in Mukonos on 9 and 10 August 2005.

=== 2006–2008: Oneira Sou Tragoudao ===
In March 2006, Ble's track "Pote" from their Sta Mavra Exo Ntithei album was included in the Diesi 101.3 radio station compilation titled Fevgo.

On May 15, 2006, Ble released the single "Ton Idio ton Theo", which reached number 8 in the chart, while on 16 July they performed on Mount Lycabettus Theatre stage, Athens.

In June, Ble released their sixth album Oneira Sou Tragoudao, which included eleven tracks; two "Ton Idio ton Theo" remixes and one "Thimose I Anoixi" remix.

Later that year, Ble included in their line up of their live appearances Stefan Schwerdtfeger, frontman of the German band, Big Sleep.

=== 2008–2010: "Mia Fora Ki Enan Kairo" ===
In 2009, the band released the Ble 1996–2009 compilation (Best Of). The first single from that album was "Mia Fora ki ena Kairo". In the same album, Ble included a cover they recorded of Yiannis Ritsos' historical song "Tha Simanoun Oi Kampanes". The cover was recorded under the license of Mikis Theodorakis for the 100 year anniversary of Yiannis Ritsos' death.

=== 2010–2012: "Mazi Sou Ego" ===
In October 2011, Ble released the single "Eho Poli Thimo". In March 2012, the band released a new single, "Mazi Sou Ego", in collaboration with Lakis Papadopoulos.

=== 2013: "Ego Mporo Kai Moni" ===
In April 2013, Ble released their new digital single "Ego Mporo Kai Moni", which is available for download on their website.

=== 2015: " .20" ===
In December 2015, Ble released their seventh, 20th anniversary album, .20, after almost a decade without an album release. The album featured ten songs, three of which had already been released as singles ("Eho Poli Thimo", "Ego Mporo Kai Moni", "Fila Me Sto Stoma"). The album was recorded and produced by Apostolos Papapostolou, who was also featured as an arranger and instrumentalist on most tracks. This collaboration revitalized the band's sound and re-established their presence in the Greek music scene.

== Band members ==
=== Current members ===
- Georgia Kefala – lead vocals (1997–present)
- George Papapostolou – guitar, sax, vocals, composer (1996–present)
- Natasa Alexiou – backing vocals, violin (1996–present)
- George Parodis – lyrics (1996–present)

=== Touring musicians ===
- Chris Koutsouris – drums, percussion
- Panos Papazoglou – guitar, backing vocals
- Chris Klaros – bass
- Diamantis Karagiannakidis – keyboards

=== Former members ===
- Theodosia Tsatsou – lead vocals (1996–1997)

=== Former touring musicians ===
- Nikos Nikolopoulos – guitar, bass
- Manolis Trihakis – keyboards

== Discography ==
=== Albums ===
- 1996: Enohes
- 1998: Ble
- 2000: Ela Na Deis
- 2002: Sta Mavra Eho Ntithei
- 2004: Etsi Thelo Ego Na Zo
- 2006: Oneira Sou Tragoudao
- 2009: Ble 1996–2009 (Compilation)
- 2015: .20

=== Singles ===
- 1996: "Mple"
- 1996: "Enohes"
- 1996: "Fovame"
- 1996: "Esi Den Zeis Pouthena"
- 1997: "Mia Fora"
- 1999: "Kola Koka" ft Antonis Kanakis and Sotiris Kalivatsis
- 2000: "Kokkino Fili"
- 2002: "Den Thelo"
- 2002: "Piano Fotia"
- 2003: "Den Xereis Poso"
- 2004: "Koitaxe Me Dio Fores"
- 2006: "Ton Idio Ton Theo"
- 2008: "Mia Fora Ki Enan Kairo"
- 2011: "Eho Poli Thimo"
- 2012: "Mazi Sou Ego" ft Lakis Papadopoulos
- 2013: "Ego Mporo Kai Moni"

=== Contributions and solo work ===
- "Mono Gia Sena" with Evridiki
