= The Winter Sun Makes Me Melancholy =

The Winter Sun Makes Me Melancholy…

Studio album by Pyx Lax
- Released: 1993
- Label: Harvest

Pyx Lax chronology
Difficult Times (1991)	The Winter Sun Makes Me Melancholy… (1993)	For the Princes of the West Bank (1994)

The Winter Sun Makes Me Melancholy... (Ο ήλιος του χειμώνα με μελαγχολεί...) was Pyx Lax's third studio album, released in 1993 on the Harvest label by Minos-EMI. It was the album which firmly established their reputation in Greece. It included their first big hit, "Let Her Talk" (Άστην να λέει), which was sung on the album by the guest singer Vasilis Karras.

== Track listing ==
"Title" (Translation) Composer/Lyricist – Track length

1. "Γιατί" (Why) Filippos Pliatsikas – 5:53
2. "Άσ’ την να λέει" (Let her talk) Manos Xydous – 4:10
3. "Σ’ αγαπω" (I love you) Manos Xydous – 3:26
4. "Η εικόνα του χειμώνα" (The image of winter) Manos Xydous/Filippos Pliatsikas – 3:30
5. "Το αργά για μας είναι νωρίς" (Late for us is early) Filippos Pliatsikas – 3:29
6. "Για μια ματιά" (For just one look) Filippos Pliatsikas – 2:25
7. "Χάθηκες αλήτισσα" (You've disappeared, tramp) Manos Xydous – 3:44
8. "Το ζεϊμπέκικο της Αθήνας" (The zeibekiko of Athens) Manos Xydous/Filippos Pliatsikas – 4:28
9. "Κόκκινος στίβος" (Red arena) Filippos Pliatsikas – 4:00
10. "Θα σε βαρεθώ" (I'll tire of you) Filippos Pliatsikas – 4:45

== Credits ==
- Akis Daoutis (Keyboards, Electric Guitar)
- Babis Stokas (Lead Vocals)
- Elena Halkidi (Backing Vocals)
- Filippos Pliatsikas (Acoustic Guitar)
- Giorgos Bousounis (Piano)
- Giorgos Vardaktsis (Electric Guitar)
- Konstantinos Zoulas (Bass)
- Manos Govatzidakis (Keyboards)
- Manos Xydous (Acoustic Guitar)
- Sakis Matzounis (Dubek)
- Tasos Psalidakis (Accordion)
- Vangelis Vekios (Drums)
- Yiannis Sotiriou (Keyboards, Percussion)

Produced by Takis Grekas, Manos Xydous, Akis Daoutis
Production co-ordinator: Manos Govatzidakis
Remix: Manos Xydous, Akis Daoutis, Manos Govatzidakis

Arranged by: Filippos Pliatsikas (tracks: 1, 5, 6); Manos Xydous (tracks: 3, 4); Akis Daoutis (tracks: 2, 7–10)
