= Tsatsos =

Tsatsos (Τσάτσος; genitive case form for female name bearers: Tsatsou Τσάτσου) is a Greek family name. Notable people with this name include:

== Tsatsos ==
- Dimitrios I. Tsatsos (1859–1921), Greek politician and lawyer
- Dimitris Tsatsos (1906–1971), Greek legal scholar and former Member of the European Parliament
- Konstantinos Tsatsos (1899–1987), Greek diplomat, professor of law, scholar and politician
- Themistokles Tsatsos (1906–1970), Greek jurist and diplomat

== Tsatsou ==
- Dora Tsatsou (1932–2000), Greek choreographer
- Theodosia Tsatsou (born 1969), Greek singer
