= Dimitris Giarmenitis =

Greek businessman

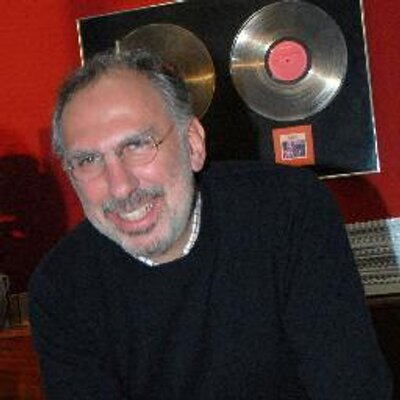
- Born: January 14, 1959 (age 67); Athens
- Other names: Yarmenitis, Dimitris
- Occupation: General manager of GEA Former managing director of Sony Music Entertainment Greece Former chairman of the IFPI / Grammo

Dimitris C. Giarmenitis or Yarmenitis (Greek: Δημήτρης Γιαρμενίτης; born January 14, 1959) is a Greek businessman, active in the music industry since 1978.

Giarmenitis is the general manager of the Greek non-profit music licensing organization 'GEA-Grammo, Erato, Apollon'. He has previously been chairman and CEO of Sony Music Entertainment Greece for 20 years (October 1991 to April 2011) and Chairman of Show What 'Events & More' (January 2008 to April 2011). Previously (1987 to 1991) Giarmenitis has been one of the most successful A&R and International Marketing managers for CBS/Sony Music in the Greek market and before that (1987–1991) an International Promo Assistant and Product Manager for CBS/Sony Music in Greece. He worked also for a while as an attorney at law.

Sony Music International (SMEI) in a ceremony specially held for him in Paris, has awarded Dimitris C. Giarmenitis at the age of 52, for his 20 years Managing Directorship, his 30 years' work in Sony Music Greece and for his achievement accomplishing over 400 Gold, Platinum and Multi-Platinum album sales awards. This represents one of the most successful artist development runs by any managing director in the history of Sony Music Entertainment. In addition to his position at SME Greece, Giarmenitis has been the chairman of IFPI/GRAMMO Greece for nearly 5 years (2007–2011).

== Early life and studies ==
Dimitris C. Giarmenitis was born on January 14, 1959, in Athens, Greece. From the first years of his life, he was passionate record collector and a music lover. He graduated from Law School of Ethnikon Kapodistriakon Panepistimion (University of Athens) in 1983, and he practiced law between 1984 and 1992 for Argyriou Law Firm.

At the same period, Giarmenitis made his first steps into the music business as a music journalist for popular music magazines in Greece, the legendary 'POP&Rock' under the guidance of the Rock and Roll Hall of Fame member from Greece, Giannis Petridis, (1978–1985) and TAHYDROMOS (1985–1991), while working as an international marketing assistant for CBS/Sony Music and a radio producer for Athens 984 and TOP FM.

In 1998, while being the managing director of SME Greece he attended an executive program at Harvard University in Harvard Kennedy School for Management.

== Career ==
=== 1981 – 2011 ===
Despite his professional activity as a lawyer and a music journalist for magazines and radios, his main career path was leaning towards the record label industry.

He started as an assistant for the International Marketing Department and a product manager in the Greek CBS/Sony Music, where he evolved into a successful International Marketing and A&R Managers, not only in the Greek market but also globally, amongst CBS/Sony Music professionals.

Giarmenitis and his team signed, developed and collaborated with artists from Cyprus and Greece, such as Helena Paparizou (winner of Eurovision Song Contest 2005)(Greek: Έλενα Παπαρίζου), Mario Frangoulis (Greek: Μάριος Φραγκούλης), Anna Vissi (Greek: Άννα Βίσση), Antonis Remos (Greek: Αντώνης Ρέμος), Katsimihas Brothers (Greek: Αδελφοί Κατσιμίχα, Glykeria (Greek: Γλυκερία), Natassa Theodoridou (Greek: Νατάσα Θεοδωρίδου), Eleni Tsaligopoulou (Greek: Ελένη Τσαλιγοπούλου), Nikos Aliagas (Greek: Νίκος Αλιάγας), Stavento, Dimitra Galani (Greek: Δήμητρα Γαλάνη), Foivos Delivorias (Greek: Φοίβος Δεληβοριάς), Phoebus (Greek: Φοίβος), Orfeas Peridis (Greek: Ορφέας Περίδης), Paschalis Terzis (Greek: Πασχάλης Τερζής), Christos Dantis (Greek: Χρήστος Δάντης), Sarbel, Giorgos Andreou, Dimitris Papadimitriou (Greek: Δημήτρης Παπαδημητρίου), George Theofanous (Greek: Γιώργος Θεοφάνους), Katy Garbi, C-Real, Giorgos Alkaios (Greek: Γιώργος Αλκαίου), Manolis Lidakis (Greek: Μανώλης Λιδάκης), Stamatis Spanoudakis (Greek: Σταμάτης Σπανουδάκης), Stamatis Kraounakis (Greek: Σταμάτης Κραουνάκης), Vassilikos, The Burger Project and many other...

Furthermore, Giarmenitis and his team promoted, with great success, international artists and brands such as Bob Dylan, Shakira, Beyoncé, Bruce Springsteen, Sade, Jennifer Lopez, George Michael, Michael Jackson, Eros Ramazzotti, Evanescence, Mariah Carey, Pink Martini, Adele, Celine Dion, Pearl Jam, ZAZ, Patricia Kaas, Alice Cooper and many others.

With all these artists Giarmenitis with his team succeeded the unprecedented peak sales for both Sony Music & the Greek music industry of approx 5 million albums.

In October 1991, at the age of 32, he was assigned as managing director of Sony Music Entertainment Greece, where he continued contributing as an Artist & Repertoire developer for Sony Music Entertainment in Greece. In 2007, he was assigned as the chairman of the Hellenic Collecting & Administrating Society of the Rights of Phonogram & Videogram Producers IFPI/Grammo. The next year, he became the first CEO of a Greek record label who developed the 360 model for SME's international and local artists, when he founded Day1's annex in Greece named as Show What Events and more and promoted with his team shows, exhibitions (such as Game On), festivals (such as Synch Festival), live concerts (such as Pet Shop Boys, Nine Inch Nails and Family Entertainment events (such as Disney on Ice and Scooby-Doo )

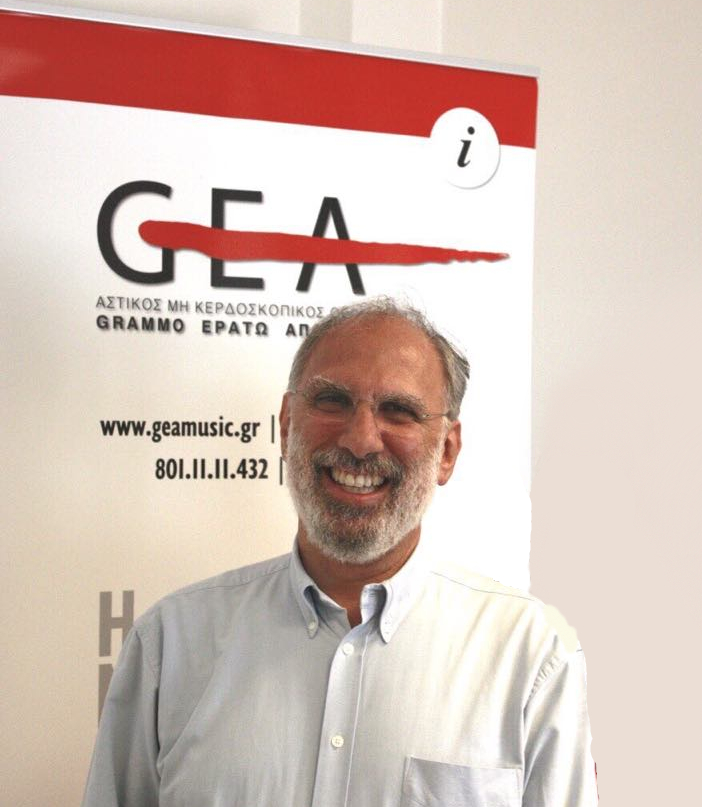

=== 2011 to present ===
In 2011, Giarmenitis decided to step off his positions as a chairman of IFPI/Grammo and managing director of SME Greece in order to continue his career as the general manager of the Greek non-profit music licensing organization for the collective management of neighbouring rights of singers, musicians and producers, GEA-Grammo, Erato, Apollon.

In the past 13 years, Giarmenitis managed to substantially contribute in the music rights landscape as the general manager of GEA. His contribution to GEA-Grammo, Erato, Apollon has made possible for professionals, owners and beneficiaries to rest assured, that the money collected by each business is irrevocably distributed each month, since 2012, to GEAs beneficiary member-organizations GRAMMO, ERATO, APOLLON. GEA, with Giarmenitis in charge, has distributed 94 collections achieving a 405% growth since GEAs first year while having licensed almost 50,000 business. All the above were accomplished during the country's worst financial period, along with the revocation of AEPI's license which damaged the music rights landscape even more. Furthermore, understanding the value of big data at strategic planning and development, he has emphasized, from the beginning, at the necessity of kpis in evaluating procedures, as well as continuously pushing forward at incorporating new reporting and AI tools, being always one step ahead.

== Other contributions ==
=== 2016 – present ===
In 2016, Giarmenitis was honourably assigned as a board member of the Ioannou - Euterpis Topali Foundation, which was founded in 1988 with the goal to raise the intellectual level of students in the University of Patras through the organization of musical, theatrical and artistic events. Due to his knowledge and connections in the entertainment industry, Giarmenitis will continue to contribute his utmost in order to help students.
