= The X Factor (Greek TV series) series 5 =

The X Factor
- Series 5
- Hosted by: Sakis Rouvas (Live Shows); Evagelia Aravani (Auditions Shows, Bootcamp, Chair Challenge, Live Shows - Backstage)
- Judges: Giorgos Mazonakis; Tamta; Giorgos Papadopoulos; Babis Stokas
- Winner: Panagiotis Koufogiannis
- Runner-up: Soula Evagelou

Release
- Original network: Skai TV; Sigma TV
- Original release: April 27 – July 20, 2017

Series chronology
- ← Previous; Series 4 Next → Series 6

The X Factor is a Greek and Cypriot television music competition to find new singing talent. The fifth series began airing on Skai TV and Sigma TV on April 27, 2017. Sakis Rouvas returned to present the main show on Skai TV for the fifth time and with Evagelia Aravani returned on Auditions Shows, Bootcamp, Chair Challenge and in Backstage at the Live Shows. Tamta was the only judge from the 4th series to return. Giorgos Mazonakis, Giorgos Papadopoulos and Babis Stokas are the new judges in the series, replacing George Theofanous, Peggy Zina and Thodoris Marantinis.

This year the teams are: the Boys with Tamta, the Girls with Giorgos Papadopoulos, the Over 25s with Giorgos Mazonakis and the Groups with Babis Stokas.

For the first time in The X Factor Greece the winner will not be from the Boys. The winner is Panagiotis Koufogiannis from the Over 25s.

== Judges and presenters ==
On 22 November 2016, series 4 judge Peggy Zina announced that she would not come back for another series on the judging panel. On 15 February 2017, it was confirmed that Giorgos Theofanous would not return as a judge. Thodoris Marantinis confirmed he was leaving the judging panel on 17 February 2017. After 5 days, it was confirmed that three new judges Babis Stokas, Giorgos Papadopoulos and Giorgos Mazonakis may come to join Tamta on the judging panel.

On 9 March 2017, Sakis Rouvas 7 days after the final of The Voice of Greece where he was a coach of series 3 he confirmed that he would return to present for the fifth time The X Factor on Skai TV and Sigma TV. On 26 December 2016 it was confirmed that Evangelia Aravani would return to present the backstage of The X Factor Live for the second time.

== Selection process ==
=== Auditions ===
The minimum age to audition this year was 16. Contestants needed three or more 'yeses' from the four judges to progress to Bootcamp.

==== Open Auditions ====
Producers auditions commenced on 14 January in Thessaloniki and ended on 23 January in Cyprus

Audition city	Open audition date	Open audition venue
Thessaloniki	14–15 January	Grand Hotel Palace
Cyprus	21, 22 and 23 January	The Classic Hotel

==== Open Call ====
The Open Call that you listen for the last time the contestants was on 26 March 2017 in Athens.

==== Judges Auditions ====
The Judges' auditions started filming in April 2017. Selected auditions were broadcast over five episodes, between 27 April 2017 to 6 May 2017.

=== Bootcamp ===
Bootcamp started filming in April 2017, at O.A.C.A. Olympic Indoor Hall. It was broadcast in an episode with the final audition after this the bootcamp began for one hour on 6 May 2017. The contestants all chose their favourite song to sing and then they put them in groups and one by one sang, in front of the judges. Immediately after each performance, the judges would either put the acts through or eliminate them immediately. 120 acts were successful in this part, and the judges then deliberated to cut the number of contestants down to forty, to decide who would reach the four-chair challenge. At the end of Bootcamp, the judges discovered which categories they would mentor: Papadopoulos was given the Girls, Tamta was given the Boys, Mazonakis was given the Over 25s and Stokas was given the Groups.

=== Four-Chair Challenge ===
The Four-chair challenge took place from 22 to 25 April, at O.A.C.A. Olympic Indoor Hall. It was broadcast over four episodes, between 11 May to 26 May. Tamta chose her final four acts during Thursday 11 May show, Papadopoulos chose his final four acts during Friday 12 May show, Mazonakis chose his final four acts during Thursday 25 May show and Stokas chose his final four acts during Friday 26 May show.

=== Live Shows ===
In first sixth weeks the Lives where in Thursdays and from seventh week there was and Mondays and Thursdays. All the Lives was at 21:00 (with Greece time).

The first live aired in Thursday 1 June, the second in Thursday 8 June, the third in Thursday 15 June, the fourth in Thursday 22 June, the fifth in Thursday 29 June, the sixth in Thursday 6 July, the seventh aired in Monday 10 July, the eight in Thursday 13 July. The Semi-Final in Monday 17 July and the Final Thursday 20 July.

== Contestants ==
The top 16 acts were confirmed as follows:

Key;

– Winner
– Runner-up
– Third Place

Category (mentor)	Acts			
Boys 16-24 (Tamta)	Angelos Provelegiadis	Alexandros Sagouris	Konstantinos Notas	Savas Savidis
Girls 16-24 (Papadopoulos)	Kassiani Dalia	Marianna Plachoura	Soula Evagelou	Thalia Tsiatini
Over 25s (Mazonakis)	Alexandra Matsi	Marianna Georgiadou	Panagiotis Koufogiannis	Vasilis Porfyrakis
Groups (Stokas)	Dee Vibes	Radiowaves	Human Factory	Coda Project

== Results Table ==
Key:

–	Contestant was in the bottom two/three and had to sing again in the final showdown
–	Contestant was in the bottom three/four but received the fewest votes and was immediately eliminated

	Week 1	Week 2	Week 3	Week 4	Week 5	Week 6	Week 7		Week 8		
	Week 1	Week 2	Week 3	Week 4	Week 5	Week 6	Monday	Thursday	Monday - Semi-Final	Thursday - Final	
	Week 1	Week 2	Week 3	Week 4	Week 5	Week 6	Monday	Thursday	Monday - Semi-Final	Round One	Round Two
Panagiotis Koufogiannis	Safe	Safe	Safe	Safe	Safe	6th	Safe	Safe	Bottom two	Safe	Winner
Soula Evagelou	Safe	Safe	Safe	Safe	Safe	Safe	Safe	Safe	Safe	Safe	Runner-up
Dee Vibes	Safe	Safe	Safe	Safe	Safe	Safe	Safe	Safe	Safe	3rd	Eliminated from Round Two
Vasilis Porfyrakis	Safe	Safe	Bottom two	Safe	Safe	Safe	Bottom two	Bottom three	Bottom two	Eliminated (Week 8)	
Konstantinos Notas	Safe	Safe	Safe	Safe	7th	Safe	Safe	Bottom three	Eliminated (Week 7)		
Coda Project	Safe	Safe	Safe	9th	Eliminated (Week 4)		Safe	6th	Eliminated (Week 7)		
Thalia Tsiatini	Safe	Bottom three	Safe	Safe	Safe	Safe	Bottom two	Eliminated (Week 7)			
Alexandros Sagouris	Safe	Safe	Safe	8th	Safe	7th	Eliminated (Week 6)				
Savas Savidis	Safe	Safe	Safe	Safe	8th	Eliminated (Week 5)					
Marianna Georgiadou	Safe	Safe	Bottom two	Eliminated (Week 3)							
Marianna Plachoura	Safe	Bottom three	Eliminated (Week 2)								
Radiowaves	Safe	12th	Eliminated (Week 2)								
Human Factory	13th-16th	Eliminated (Week 1)									
Alexandra Matsi	13th-16th	Eliminated (Week 1)									
Kassiani Dalia	13th-16th	Eliminated (Week 1)									
Angelos Provelegiadis	13th-16th	Eliminated (Week 1)									
Final showdown	No final showdown or judges' vote: results are based on public votes alone	Marianna Plachoura	Vasilis Porfyrakis	Alexandros Sagouris	Konstantinos Notas	Alexandros Sagouris	Vasilis Porfyrakis	Vasilis Porfyrakis	Vasilis Porfyrakis	No final showdown or judges' vote: results are based on public votes alone	
Final showdown	No final showdown or judges' vote: results are based on public votes alone	Thalia Tsiatini	Marianna Georgiadou	Coda Project	Savas Savidis	Panagiotis Koufogiannis	Thalia Tsiatini	Konstantinos Notas	Panagiotis Koufogiannis	No final showdown or judges' vote: results are based on public votes alone	
Mazonakis's vote to eliminate	No final showdown or judges' vote: results are based on public votes alone	Marianna Plachoura	Marianna Georgiadou	Coda Project	Savas Savidis	Alexandros Sagouris	Thalia Tsiatini	Konstantinos Notas	Vasilis Porfyrakis	No final showdown or judges' vote: results are based on public votes alone	
Tamta's vote to eliminate	No final showdown or judges' vote: results are based on public votes alone	Marianna Plachoura	Vasilis Porfyrakis	Coda Project	Konstantinos Notas	Panagiotis Koufogiannis	Thalia Tsiatini	Vasilis Porfyrakis	Vasilis Porfyrakis	No final showdown or judges' vote: results are based on public votes alone	
Papadopoulos's vote to eliminate	No final showdown or judges' vote: results are based on public votes alone	—	Marianna Georgiadou	Alexandros Sagouris	Savas Savidis	Alexandros Sagouris	Vasilis Porfyrakis	Konstantinos Notas	Vasilis Porfyrakis	No final showdown or judges' vote: results are based on public votes alone	
Stokas's vote to eliminate	No final showdown or judges' vote: results are based on public votes alone	Marianna Plachoura	Marianna Georgiadou	Alexandros Sagouris	Konstantinos Notas	Panagiotis Koufogiannis	Thalia Tsiatini	Konstantinos Notas	Vasilis Porfyrakis	No final showdown or judges' vote: results are based on public votes alone	
Eliminated	Human Factory; Public Votes	Radiowaves; Public Votes	Marianna Georgiadou; 3 of 4 votes Majority	Coda Project; 2 of 4 votes Deadlock	Savas Savidis; 2 of 4 votes Deadlock	Alexandros Sagouris; 2 of 4 votes Deadlock	Thalia Tsiatini; 3 of 4 votes Majority	Coda Project; Public Votes	Vasilis Porfyrakis; 4 of 4 votes Majority	Dee Vibes; 3rd Place	Soula Evagelou; Runner-up
Eliminated	Alexandra Matsi; Public Votes	Radiowaves; Public Votes	Marianna Georgiadou; 3 of 4 votes Majority	Coda Project; 2 of 4 votes Deadlock	Savas Savidis; 2 of 4 votes Deadlock	Alexandros Sagouris; 2 of 4 votes Deadlock	Thalia Tsiatini; 3 of 4 votes Majority	Coda Project; Public Votes	Vasilis Porfyrakis; 4 of 4 votes Majority	Dee Vibes; 3rd Place	Soula Evagelou; Runner-up
Eliminated	Kassiani Dalia; Public Votes	Marianna Plachoura; 3 of 3 votes Majority	Marianna Georgiadou; 3 of 4 votes Majority	Coda Project; 2 of 4 votes Deadlock	Savas Savidis; 2 of 4 votes Deadlock	Alexandros Sagouris; 2 of 4 votes Deadlock	Thalia Tsiatini; 3 of 4 votes Majority	Konstantinos Notas; 3 of 4 votes Majority	Vasilis Porfyrakis; 4 of 4 votes Majority	Dee Vibes; 3rd Place	Panagiotis Koufogiannis; Winner
Eliminated	Angelos Provelegiadis; Public Votes	Marianna Plachoura; 3 of 3 votes Majority	Marianna Georgiadou; 3 of 4 votes Majority	Coda Project; 2 of 4 votes Deadlock	Savas Savidis; 2 of 4 votes Deadlock	Alexandros Sagouris; 2 of 4 votes Deadlock	Thalia Tsiatini; 3 of 4 votes Majority	Konstantinos Notas; 3 of 4 votes Majority	Vasilis Porfyrakis; 4 of 4 votes Majority	Dee Vibes; 3rd Place	Panagiotis Koufogiannis; Winner

- In Week 6 was announced that Coda Project will come back after public votes.

== Final ==
=== Alone ===
Contestants' performances on the final live show
Act	Order	Song of the series	Order	Song to win	Result
Dee Vibes	1	"All the time"	— already eliminated		3rd Place
Soula Evagelou	2	"Se Gireyo"	4	"Dipla se sena"	Runner-up
Panagiotis Koufogiannis	3	"Dream On"	5	"Can't Feel My Face"	Winner

=== Duet ===
Contestants' performances on the final live show
Acts	Order	Song
Dee Vibes Panagiotis Koufogiannis	1	"See You Again"
Panagiotis Koufogiannis Soula Evagelou	2	"Isos"
Soula Evagelou Dee Vibes	3	"Nero kai xoma" "Pidao ta kimata"
