= Pyx Lax =

Greek rock band

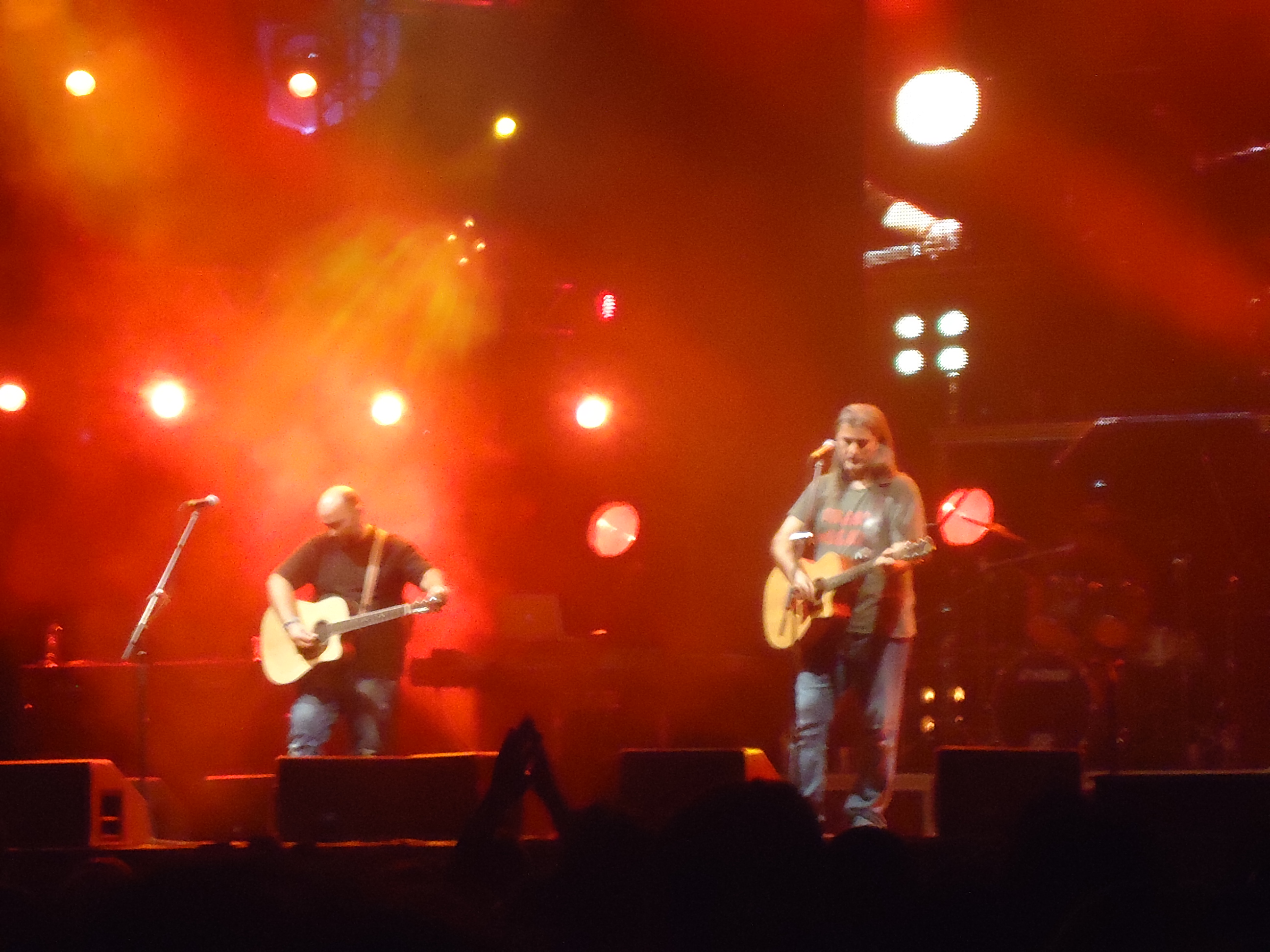

Background information
- Origin: Athens, Greece
- Genres: Rock
- Years active: 1989–2004, 2011, 2018–
- Labels: Minos EMI Panik Records
- Members: Filippos Pliatsikas; Babis Stokas

Pyx Lax (Greek: Πυξ Λαξ, meaning "punching and kicking") is a Greek rock band. Originally formed in 1989, they released their first recording in 1990, and had a critical and commercial success in the Greek music industry for fifteen years, before being dissolved in 2004. They reunited in 2011 for a tour in honor of Manos Xydous who died in 2010. In 2018, they reunited permanently. They are considered as the most successful, commercially, group in the history of Greek discography with three gold and five platinum albums (among which: Gia Tous Prinkipes Tis Dytikis Ochthis, Stilvi, Yparchoun Chrysopsara Edo?). Some of their greatest hits were: "De Tha Dakryso Pia Gia Sena", "Ti Ine Afto Pou Mas Enoni?", "I Palies Agapes Pane Ston Paradeiso", "Mia Synousia Mystiki", "Epapses Agapi na thymizeis", "Poula me", and "Monaxia mou ola".

Pyx Lax recorded the great majority of their songs in Greek, with an exception of a few recordings. In 1999 they released the platinum cd-single "Let The Picture Do The Talking" ("As tin Ikona Na Milai") along with Sting and the Corsican group I Muvrini. Most of their English-language songs were included in their last album Charoumeni Stin Poli ton Trelon (2003), in which they collaborated with Eric Burdon, Gordon Gano, Marc Almond and Steve Wynn.

== Name ==
The name "Pyx Lax" (Greek: Πυξ Λαξ) derives from ancient Greek, meaning "Punching and Kicking", and was inspired by the title of a theatrical play which was taking place in Athens at the period in which the band was formed in 1989.

Their name is officially spelled as Pyx Lax in the English language [It appears this way in all three of their international recordings: Let the picture do the talking (1999), Panic! The Remixes (2000) and Haroumeni stin Poli ton Trelon (2003)]. However, a Latinised spelling of the band's name is also given: "Pix Lax" on Zoriki Kairi (1991).

== History ==
=== Band formation: early years (1989–1992) ===
Initially the members of the band were Filippos Pliatsikas, Babis Stokas, Sakis Stamoulis, and Panayiotis Spyropoulos. Their professional recording career began with a demo cassette which they delivered to Minos EMI in Athens. According to Vasilis Konstantoulakis:

It was the beginning of the summer of 1989. We were gathered in the office of the producer Secundus Buchayer and his then secretary Maria Parousi, when the group that later became Pyx Lax appeared.... The three who came were Bambis, Sakis "Kounoupis" (Stamoulis his surname) and Panayiotis Spyropoulos. Filippos was absent. I accepted the [demo] cassette, and having greeted us politely, they left. Morning coffee was an opportunity for us to listen to it and I went to Manos and Secundus... I was working in Foreign Repertoire, Maria didn’t listen to Greek music, so superior criticism and nitpicking were a given... But it didn’t happen like that. We liked it; and I always remember from that first cassette an early performance of "Γιατί" ["Why"], which much later appeared on their third album. Naturally Manos liked the cassette even more!

Marketing Director of Minos EMI at the time, Manos Xydous, liked their recordings so much, that he later joined the band. Another member of staff, Dimitris Fergadis, the head of Sales, proposed their name Pyx Lax. Of the four initial members of the band, mentioned by Konstantoulakis in his account of the submission of the demo tape, two left the band in its early days: Panayiotis for unknown reasons, and Sakis "probably because he was bored". Informally Manos Xydous was a member of the band from early in its recording career, he contributed songs to all of their albums, including the first, and he is pictured on the cover of the second album along with Babis Stokas and Filippos Pliatsikas. At some point he gave up his job at EMI Greece and formally became a member of Pyx Lax. It can be deduced, from what Konstantoulakis says, that this must have happened sometime after the recording of Asti na Lei (1993) for the third album ("We all knew that informally Manos was already a member".) and before the band went to Oxford to record "Monaxia Mou Ola".

Their first promotional performance was at Laleousa on Ethniki Odos, a club known not for rock but for laïko music (a popular song style based on traditional forms). This was followed by an appearance for the media at the Rodon in November. The band returned there three years later, performing for three sold-out concerts.

=== First success – establishment in Greek musical industry (1993–1997) ===
It was their third album, 1993's O Ilios tou Chimona me Melancholi (The Winter Sun Makes Me Melancholic) which firmly established their reputation in Greece. It included their first big hit, Asti Na Lei, a song written by Manos Xydous which was performed on the album by the popular singer Vasilis Karras.

Their next album, Yia Tous Prigkipes tis Dytikis Ohthis (1994) was certified gold. Big hits were included in the album, such as De Tha Dakryso Pia Gia Sena, Anites Agapes (along with Haris & Panos Katsimihas) and Ti Ine Afto Pou Mas Chorizi, written by the Serbian composer Sasa Dragic. After the album's release, Pyx Lax were often referred to as the "Princes of the West Bank". (The West Bank of Kifissos river in western Athens.) According to Pliatsikas:

In 1994 we released the record "Gia tous Prinkipes tis Dytikis Ochthis" dedicated to the people of western Athens, where we lived—people who laboured and were wage earners, and whom we saw as princes because they returned to their homes [from work] and had the heart to smile. They kept up their friendships and were civil to one another. That’s how we got stuck with the title "princes of the west bank".

In 1996, the band's first platinum album followed: O Baboulas Tragoudai Monos tis Nychtes (The Boogeyman Sings Alone at Nights), including the hits I Palies Agapes Pane Ston Paradiso and Na Me Thymithis.

In 1997, Pyx Lax released a live album, Zontani Ichografisi stin Iera Odo (Live Recording at the Sacred Way) and a cd-single, "Nychterinos Peripatos stin Iera Odo" (Evening Stroll on the Sacred Way) in collaboration with one of Greece's long established top singers George Dalaras. Both records were certified platinum sales. The same year the band released another live album, Pixe Paliatso ta Tragoudia Sou Telionoun, including live recordings from its performances during the period 1991–1997.

=== Final period: Commercial and critical achievements (1998–2003) ===
Their biggest selling record was the album Stilvi (Shine, 1998), made up mostly of music and songs from the film by Dimitris Panagiotatos Monaxia Mou Ola (My Loneliness Everything, 1998). It includes a fine version in Greek of Bob Dylan's "Señor (Tales of Yankee Power)" from his album Street-Legal, as long as the big hits: Monaxia Mou Ola, Epapses Agapi Na Thymizis and Mia Synousia Mystiki.

Stilvi was followed in 1999 by another commercially successful release: the double album Yparchoun Chrysopsara Edo? (Are There Any Goldfish Here?), which over passed 80,000 sales and received triple platinum certification. Half of the album included new songs and the other half live recordings.

In 2002, the first year of the Arion Music Awards, Pyx Lax won the best Rock/Alternative Album award for Ta Dokaria sto Grasidi Perimenoun ta Pedia (The Climbing Frames on the Grass Are Waiting For the Children, 2001). The album also earned Pyx Lax the award for best group in the Entechno category. The album was a notable critical and commercial success, although rumors before its release were pointing out the dissolve of the band. It achieved platinum status and included hits like Pyxida and Mono Gia Kini Mi Mou Les.

The last studio album of Pyx Lax, Charoumeni Stin Poli Ton Trelon (Happy in the City of Fools, 2003) included important collaborations with worldwide famous artists, new songs, as long as the adaptation of some of the band's biggest hits in English. In spite of the important names and the experimental sound, their last album was poorly received by fans and critics. Despite that fact, in 2004 the album earned the band another double awarding in the Arion Awards for the Best Album in both Rock/Alternative and Entechno categories.

== Collaborations ==
During their career, Pyx lax have collaborated with many Greek singers and musicians such as George Dalaras, Haris Alexiou, Vasilis Papakonstantinou, Katsimihas Brothers, Lavrentis Machairitsas, Miltiadis Paschalidis, Vasilis Karras, Makis Christodoulopoulos, Sotiria Leonardou, Melina Tanagri, Psarantonis, Lakis Papadopoulos, Domenica, ONAR, Theodosia Tsatsou, Mihalis Tzouganakis, Ilias Makridis and many more.

The biggest number of the band's international collaborations were included in their last studio album Charoumeni Stin Poli Ton Trelon (2003), with most notable songs: "Someone Wrote 'Save Me' On a Wall" (with Eric Burdon singing lead) and "All My Angels Falling" (with Marc Almond). In 1999 they had also released the cd-single "Let The Picture Do The Talking" (As' tin Ikona Na Milai) along with the Corsican group I Muvrini and Sting. Other important international artists that collaborated with Pyx Lax were: Gordon Gano, Steve Wynn, Bajaga and Saša Dragić.

== Dissolution of the band, reunification and concerts ==
In 2004, the band announced in a television interview that it would be dissolved after two goodbye concerts. The concerts were scheduled for 18 September in Athens and 20 September in Thessaloniki. Tickets for the Athens concert were sold out within a few hours, and a second concert was arranged for 19 September. Their final album, called simply Telos – Live Sto Likavitto (End – Live at Lycabetus) is a recording of the first goodbye concert in Lykavittos, Athens.

In 2010, Manos Xydous died at the age of 57. Before his death the members of Pyx Lax were in talks of a reunification for concerts during 2011. The reunification finally took place without Manos with a big tour around Greece. The most significant moment was the massive concert of the 13 July 2011 at the Athens Olympic Stadium, with a crowd of more than 75,000 spectators. The tour continued with many more concerts around Greece.

In 2012, Pyx Lax went on their farewell North American Tour, with the first show of the tour selling out at New York City's Terminal 5.

== Tours ==
Pyx Lax: 30 Years Tour (2018)

== Legacy ==
In their time, Pyx Lax were considered to be one of the most popular bands in Greece. Sotiria Malfa, a Greek critic wrote that "The stamp of Pyx Lax on Greek music of the end of the 90s and the beginning of the 00s is something more than profound."

Another critic, Pavlos Zervas, wrote that the demise of Pyx Lax "...leaves the Greek music scene significantly poorer, since it is losing a band which granted us unique, unbelievable moments, and which retained for all these years a character all its own—a character which was tending to become a "school" followed by many artists and groups. It is not chance that after the appearance of Pyx Lax, phrases like "Clone Pyx Lax" were used to characterise other groups and their music."

The band has been recognized for both their longevity and the number of records they sold, as well as "the unique feeling which was created between Pyx Lax and their beloved public."

== Discography ==
=== Albums ===
Year	Title	Certification
1990	Ti allo na peis pio apla	-
1991	Zorikoi Kairoi	-
1993	O Ilios tou Chimona Me Melancholi	-
1994	Gia tous Prinkipes tis Dytikis Ochthis	Gold
1996	O Baboulas Tragoudai Monos tis Nyhtes	Platinum
1997	Pixe Paliatso Ta Tragoudia Sou Telionoun (Live)	-
1997	Zontani Ichografisi Stin Iera Odo (Live) with George Dalaras	Platinum
1998	Stilvi	Platinum
1999	Yparchoun Chrysopsara Edo?	3× Platinum
2001	Ta Dokaria sto Grasidi Perimenoun ta pedia	Platinum
2003	Charoumeni Stin Poli Ton Trelon	-
2004	Telos - Live sto Likavitto (2 CDs + DVD)	Gold
2018	Mia Mera Prin Ton Chimona	-
2021	Mesa Ap' Tis Fones Ton Filon	-
2025	Ligo Xroma Gia Ta Skoura	-

=== CD singles ===
Year	Title	Certification
1997	"Nychterinos Peripatos stin Iera Odo" with George Dalaras	Platinum
1998	"O Erotas kimithike noris" with Makis Christodoulopoulos	-
1998	"Netrino" with Lakis Papadopoulos	-
1999	"As' Tin Ikona Na Milai" with I Muvrini and Sting	Platinum
2000	"Pyx Lax - The Remixes" by Panic!	-

=== Compilations and other ===
Year	Title	Certification
2002	Apo Edo Ki Apo Ki	Gold
2008	Best of Pyx Lax (3 CDs & DVD)	-
2011	I Man, Kita Brosta (Live)	-
