= Onar =

Onar may refer to:

- Ónar, in Norse mythology
- Onar, Ardabil, a town in Iran
- ONAR, a Greek musical group
- Onar (rapper), a Polish rapper

== People with the name ==
- Orhan Onar (1923–2009), Turkish judge
- Sıddık Sami Onar (1898–1972), Turkish academic
- Onar Onarheim (1910–1988), Norwegian politician
