= Pliatsikas =

Pliatsikas (Greek: Πλιάτσικας) is a Greek surname. Notable people with the surname include:

- Filippos Pliatsikas (born 1967), Greek musician, composer and lyricist
- Vasilios Pliatsikas (born 1988), Greek footballer
