= The X Factor (Greek TV series) series 6 =

The X Factor
- Series 6
- Hosted by: Despina Vandi; Aris Makris
- Judges: Giorgos Theofanous; Melina Aslanidou; Christos Mastoras; Michael Tsaousopoulos
- Winner: Giannis Grosis
- Runner-up: Dimitris Papatsakonas

Release
- Original network: Open TV; Omega TV
- Original release: September 11 – December 18, 2019

Series chronology
- ← Previous; Series 5 Next → Series 7

The X Factor is a Greek and Cypriot television music competition to find new singing talent. The sixth series began airing on Open TV on September 11, 2019.

The judges were Giorgos Theofanous, who returned for his fifth series after a one-series hiatus as judge, former The Voice of Greece coach Melina Aslanidou, former Rising Star judge Christos Mastoras and Athens DeeJay Michael Tsaousopoulos. For the first time the presenter was replaced by Despina Vandi, she was presenting the live shows and the four-chair challenges. Aris Makris was presenting the Backstage at the live shows and also he was on auditions, bootcamps and four-chair challenges.

Giannis Grosis won the competition on December 18, 2019, and he became the fifth boy to win the competition, he received €50,000 and a record deal with Panik Records and Christos Mastoras became the winning mentor for the first time.

== Judges and presenters ==
Giorgos Liagkas, who also hosted the Greek version of The Voice, was rumored to be the host of the show. On June 25, 2018, it was confirmed from Epsilon TV (Open TV now) that Despina Vandi will be the host of Live Shows, replacing Sakis Rouvas. It was rumored that Evelyn Kazatzoglou will be at the Backstage of Live Shows. Evangelia Aravani was rumored that she will be for a third time a backstage host. On the running was also Aris Makris and on February 22 was confirmed that he will be at the Backstage of Auditions, Bootcamp, Four-Chair Challenge and Live Shows.

Several artists were rumored to be part of the judging panel once Open TV announced the show. Fotis Sergoulopoulos was the first to be rumored. Tamta that was in fourth and fifth series was rumored to be again in the show, after some weeks was announced that she will represent Cyprus in the Eurovision Song Contest 2019 and so she can't be this year a judge. It was rumored also that Paola will be in the judging panel. Eleni Foureira, was rumored also but a program on Open TV they told that there was never a proposal in Foureira. On the running were also Antonis Remos, Melina Aslanidou, Konstantinos Argyros, Christos Mastoras and Giorgos Theofanous. On February 18, 2019, Giorgos Theofanous was confirmed to be returning for his fifth series followed by new judges, Melina Aslanidou and Christos Mastoras. On February 20, was confirmed that the fourth judge will be Michael Tsaousopoulos.

== Selection process ==
=== Judges Auditions ===
The minimum age to audition was 16. After one series the auditions was again held in front of an audience. Contestants needed three or more 'yeses' from the four judges to progress to Bootcamp. The auditions began on 22 May 2019, in Athens and ended on 12 June 2019, in Thessaloniki.

Summary of judges' auditions
City	Date(s)	Venue
Athens	21–23, 27–30 May 2019	«Theater», Hellenic Cosmos Cultural Center
Thessaloniki	11–12 June 2019	Monastery of Lazariston Theater

The Auditions were aired over nine episodes from September 11, 2019, until September 27, 2019.

=== Bootcamp ===
Bootcamp took place at «Theater», Hellenic Cosmos Cultural Center from 10 to 11 July 2019. The challenge of bootcamp was to perform in groups of five acts, with a mix of at least three categories in each group, and perform a song from a list. The judges would decide immediately after each performance which of the 110 acts would pass the challenge and which would be eliminated.

At the end of the Bootcamp challenge, the judges discovered which categories they would mentor: Tsaousopoulos was given the Girls, Mastoras was given the Boys, Aslanidou was given Overs, and Theofanous was given the Groups.

Bootcamp was aired on September 27, 2019.

=== Four-chair challenge ===
The four-chair challenge took place over the course of three days, from 3 to 5 September 2019, at Kapa Studios 2 Athens. 40 acts faced the four-chair challenge, 10 from each category. The challenge will broadcast on 2, 3, 9 and 10 October.

Key:

– Contestant was immediately eliminated after performance without given a chair
– Contestant was given a chair but swapped out later in the competition and eventually eliminated
– Contestant was given a chair and made the final four of their own category

Episode	Category (mentor)	Order	Act	Song	Mentor's decision	Swapped with
Episode 10 (2 October)	Groups (Theofanous)	1	DAF	"Believer"	Put in chair 1	–
Episode 10 (2 October)	Groups (Theofanous)	2	What Ells?	"Beautiful Liar"	Eliminated	–
Episode 10 (2 October)	Groups (Theofanous)	3	Liak and the Cover	"Ki Emeina Edo"	Put in chair 2	–
Episode 10 (2 October)	Groups (Theofanous)	4	Duo Liba (Note: Theofanous decided to put Duo Liba and Appartia together as a group and to move in Live Shows as one, with the name Appartia. However, before the live shows, Appartia withdrew from the competition and were replaced by Ano Kato.)	"Save Tonight"	Put in chair 3	–
Episode 10 (2 October)	Groups (Theofanous)	5	Enorasis	"Stin Diskotek"	Put in chair 4	–
Episode 10 (2 October)	Groups (Theofanous)	6	Three Ways	"What Makes You Beautiful"	Eliminated	–
Episode 10 (2 October)	Groups (Theofanous)	7	Ano Kato	"Venzinadiko"	Put in chair 4	Enorasis
Episode 10 (2 October)	Groups (Theofanous)	8	Appartia	"Fever"/"The Passenger"	Put in chair 3	–
Episode 10 (2 October)	Groups (Theofanous)	9	Dreamwalkers Triangle	"Okytokinh"/"Wire to Wire"	Eliminated	–
Episode 10 (2 October)	Groups (Theofanous)	10	AC²	"Rewrite the Stars"	Put in chair 4	Ano Kato
Episode 11 (3 October)	Over 25s (Aslanidou)	1	Kyriaki Nikolaou	"To Dikio Mou"	Put in chair 1	–
Episode 11 (3 October)	Over 25s (Aslanidou)	2	Elisavet Athanasiadou	"Piece of My Heart"	Put in chair 2	–
Episode 11 (3 October)	Over 25s (Aslanidou)	3	Nektarios Rigas	"Xamopoulia"	Put in chair 3	–
Episode 11 (3 October)	Over 25s (Aslanidou)	4	Basilikh Xoursoutoglou	"Diamonds"	Eliminated	–
Episode 11 (3 October)	Over 25s (Aslanidou)	5	Maria Kiou	"Duo meres mono"	Put in chair 4	–
Episode 11 (3 October)	Over 25s (Aslanidou)	6	Xristoforos Katrnara Ompioma	"LoveStoned"	Put in chair 4	Maria Kiou
Episode 11 (3 October)	Over 25s (Aslanidou)	7	Romaios Papadopoulos	"Duomisi"	Eliminated	–
Episode 11 (3 October)	Over 25s (Aslanidou)	8	Giannis Antzouris	"Auth h nuxta nenei"	Put in chair 2	Elisavet Athanasiadou
Episode 11 (3 October)	Over 25s (Aslanidou)	9	Lila Trianti	"Sto theo me paei"	Put in chair 1	Kyriaki Nikolaou
Episode 11 (3 October)	Over 25s (Aslanidou)	10	Konstantinos Stinis	"Sex on Fire"	Put in chair 4	Xristoforos Katrnara Ompioma (Obi)
Episode 12 (9 October)	Girls 16-24 (Tsaousopoulos)	1	Mary Vassiliadou	"Stay"	Put in chair 1	–
Episode 12 (9 October)	Girls 16-24 (Tsaousopoulos)	2	Dimitra Dimitriou	"Just Give Me a Reason"	Put in chair 2	–
Episode 12 (9 October)	Girls 16-24 (Tsaousopoulos)	3	Maria Papadopoulou	"Mia pista apo fosforo"	Put in chair 3	–
Episode 12 (9 October)	Girls 16-24 (Tsaousopoulos)	4	Maria Kosmatou	"Stop!"	Put in chair 4	–
Episode 12 (9 October)	Girls 16-24 (Tsaousopoulos)	5	Eirini Perikleous	"Anthrope"	Eliminated	–
Episode 12 (9 October)	Girls 16-24 (Tsaousopoulos)	6	Konstantina Aresti	"Rise Up"	Put in chair 2	Dimitra Dimitriou
Episode 12 (9 October)	Girls 16-24 (Tsaousopoulos)	7	Zoi Misel Bakiri	"Fallin'"	Put in chair 3	Maria Papadopoulou
Episode 12 (9 October)	Girls 16-24 (Tsaousopoulos)	8	Viky Mariolou	"Ego s’ agapisa edo"	Put in chair 4	Maria Kosmatou
Episode 12 (9 October)	Girls 16-24 (Tsaousopoulos)	9	Jody Lulati	"Jolene"	Eliminated	–
Episode 12 (9 October)	Girls 16-24 (Tsaousopoulos)	10	Chrystalla Karapitta	"Do It like a Dude"	Eliminated	–
Episode 13 (10 October)	Boys 16-24 (Mastoras)	1	Alex Diamantis	"When We Were Young"	Put in chair 1	–
Episode 13 (10 October)	Boys 16-24 (Mastoras)	2	Dimitris Peronis	"Apotypomata"	Put in chair 2	–
Episode 13 (10 October)	Boys 16-24 (Mastoras)	3	Frankisko Giannisopoulos	"O vythos sou"	Put in chair 3	–
Episode 13 (10 October)	Boys 16-24 (Mastoras)	4	Giannis Tergiakis	"Read All About It, Pt. III"	Put in chair 4	–
Episode 13 (10 October)	Boys 16-24 (Mastoras)	5	Giorgos Konstantinidis	"O Amlet tis selinis"	Put in chair 2	Dimitris Peronis
Episode 13 (10 October)	Boys 16-24 (Mastoras)	6	Giorgos Papanastasiou	"Airplanes"	Put in chair 2	Giorgo Konstantinidis
Episode 13 (10 October)	Boys 16-24 (Mastoras)	7	Anastasis Oikonomou	"I zoi allios"	Eliminated	–
Episode 13 (10 October)	Boys 16-24 (Mastoras)	8	Grigoris Tsavdaridis	"S&M"	Eliminated	–
Episode 13 (10 October)	Boys 16-24 (Mastoras)	9	Giannis Grosis	"Nychta zoriki"	Put in chair 1	Alex Diamantis
Episode 13 (10 October)	Boys 16-24 (Mastoras)	10	Dimitris Papatsakonas	"The House of the Rising Sun"	Put in chair 3	Frankisko Giannisopoulos

== Contestants ==
The top 16 acts were confirmed as follows:

Key:

– Winner
– Runner-up

Contestant	Age(s)	Hometown	Category (mentor)	Result
Giannis Grosis	20	Thessaloniki	Boys 16-24 (Mastoras)	Winner
Dimitris Papatsakonas	19	Karditsa	Boys 16-24 (Mastoras)	2nd place Runner-up
AC²	17/24	Athens	Groups (Theofanous)	3rd place
Konstantinos Stinis	26	Athens	Over 25s (Aslanidou)	4th place
Ano Kato		Thessaloniki	Groups (Theofanous)	5th place
Liak and the Cover	16/31/31	Crete / Thessaloniki	Groups (Theofanous)	6th place
Zoi Misel Bakiri	19	Rhodes	Girls 16-24 (Tsaousopoulos)	7th place
Giannis Tergiakis	17	Athens	Boys 16-24 (Mastoras)	8th place
Lila Trianti	26	Athens	Over 25s (Aslanidou)	9th place
Konstantina Aresti	16	Nicosia	Girls 16-24 (Tsaousopoulos)	10th place
Giannis Antzouris	31	Volos	Over 25s (Aslanidou)	11th place
Mary Vassiliadou	18	Thessaloniki	Girls 16-24 (Tsaousopoulos)	12th place
Viky Mariolou	23	Tripoli	Girls 16-24 (Tsaousopoulos)	13th-16th place
Giorgos Papanastasiou	22	Thessaloniki	Boys 16-24 (Mastoras)	13th-16th place
Nektarios Rigas	31	Volos	Over 25s (Aslanidou)	13th-16th place
DAF		Athens	Groups (Theofanous)	13th-16th place

== Live shows ==
The contestants were announced after each category performed at Four-chair challenge. There were 16 contestants (4 from each category) this year. The Live Shows were broadcast for 10 weeks from 17 October.

=== Results summary ===
Colour key

–	Contestant was in the bottom two/three and had to sing again in the final showdown
–	Contestant was in the bottom three/four but received the fewest votes and was immediately eliminated

	Week 1	Week 2	Week 3	Week 4	Week 5	Week 6	Week 7	Week 8	Week 9	Week 10	
	Week 1	Week 2	Week 3	Week 4	Week 5	Week 6	Week 7	Week 8	Week 9	Round one	Round two
Giannis Grosis	Safe	Safe	Safe	Safe	Safe	Safe	Safe	Safe	Safe	Safe	Winner
Dimitris Papatsakonas	Safe	Safe	Safe	Safe	Safe	Safe	Safe	Safe	Safe	Safe	Runner-up
AC²	Safe	Safe	10th	Safe	Safe	Safe	Bottom two	Safe	3rd	3rd Place	Eliminated (week 10)
Konstantinos Stinis	Safe	Safe	Safe	Safe	Safe	Safe	Safe	Safe	4th	Eliminated (week 9)	
Ano Kato	Safe	Safe	Safe	Safe	8th	Safe	Safe	Bottom two	5th	Eliminated (week 9)	
Liak and the Cover	Safe	Safe	Safe	Safe	Safe	Safe	Safe	Bottom two	Eliminated (week 8)		
Zoi Misel Bakiri	Safe	Safe	Safe	Bottom two	Safe	7th	Bottom two	Eliminated (week 7)			
Giannis Tergiakis	Safe	Safe	Safe	Safe	Safe	8th	Eliminated (week 6)				
Lila Trianti	Safe	Safe	Safe	Safe	9th	Eliminated (week 5)					
Konstantina Aresti	Safe	Safe	Safe	Bottom two	Eliminated (week 4)						
Giannis Antzouris	Safe	11th	11th	Eliminated (week 3)							
Mary Vassiliadou	Safe	12th	Eliminated (week 2)								
Viky Mariolou	13-16th	Eliminated (week 1)									
Giorgos Papanastasiou	13-16th	Eliminated (week 1)									
Nektarios Rigas	13-16th	Eliminated (week 1)									
DAF	13-16th	Eliminated (week 1)									
Final showdown	No final showdown or judges' vote: results are based on public votes alone	Mary Vassiliadou	AC²	Konstantina Aresti	Ano Kato	Zoi Misel Bakiri	Zoi Misel Bakiri	Ano Kato	AC²	No final showdown or judges' vote: results are based on public votes alone	
Final showdown	No final showdown or judges' vote: results are based on public votes alone	Giannis Antzouris	Giannis Antzouris	Zoi Misel Bakiri	Lila Trianti	Giannis Tergiakis	AC²	Liak and the Cover	Konstantinos Stinis	No final showdown or judges' vote: results are based on public votes alone	
Judges voted to	No final showdown or judges' vote: results are based on public votes alone	Eliminate							Send Through	No final showdown or judges' vote: results are based on public votes alone	
Theofanous' vote	No final showdown or judges' vote: results are based on public votes alone	Giannis Antzouris	Giannis Antzouris	Zoi Misel Bakiri	Lila Trianti	Giannis Tergiakis	Zoi Misel Bakiri	—N/a^{1}	AC²	No final showdown or judges' vote: results are based on public votes alone	
Aslanidou's vote	No final showdown or judges' vote: results are based on public votes alone	Mary Vassiliadou	AC²	Konstantina Aresti	Ano Kato	Zoi Misel Bakiri	Zoi Misel Bakiri	Liak and the Cover	Konstantinos Stinis	No final showdown or judges' vote: results are based on public votes alone	
Mastoras' vote	No final showdown or judges' vote: results are based on public votes alone	Mary Vassiliadou	Giannis Antzouris	Zoi Misel Bakiri	Ano Kato	Zoi Misel Bakiri	Zoi Misel Bakiri	Liak and the Cover	Konstantinos Stinis	No final showdown or judges' vote: results are based on public votes alone	
Tsaousopoulos' vote	No final showdown or judges' vote: results are based on public votes alone	Giannis Antzouris	AC²	Konstantina Aresti (×2)	Lila Trianti	Giannis Tergiakis	AC²	Liak and the Cover	AC²	No final showdown or judges' vote: results are based on public votes alone	
Eliminated	Viky Mariolou; Public Vote	Mary Vassiliadou; 2 of 4 votes Deadlock	Giannis Antzouris; 2 of 4 votes Deadlock	Konstantina Aresti; 3 of 5 votes Majority	Lila Trianti; 2 of 4 votes Deadlock	Giannis Tergiakis; 2 of 4 votes Deadlock	Zoi Misel Bakiri; 3 of 4 votes Majority	Liak and the Cover; 3 of 3 votes Majority	Ano Kato; Public Vote	AC²; 3rd Place	Dimitris Papatsakonas; Runner-up
Eliminated	Giorgos Papanastasiou; Public Vote	Mary Vassiliadou; 2 of 4 votes Deadlock	Giannis Antzouris; 2 of 4 votes Deadlock	Konstantina Aresti; 3 of 5 votes Majority	Lila Trianti; 2 of 4 votes Deadlock	Giannis Tergiakis; 2 of 4 votes Deadlock	Zoi Misel Bakiri; 3 of 4 votes Majority	Liak and the Cover; 3 of 3 votes Majority	Ano Kato; Public Vote	AC²; 3rd Place	Dimitris Papatsakonas; Runner-up
Eliminated	Nektarios Rigas; Public Vote	Mary Vassiliadou; 2 of 4 votes Deadlock	Giannis Antzouris; 2 of 4 votes Deadlock	Konstantina Aresti; 3 of 5 votes Majority	Lila Trianti; 2 of 4 votes Deadlock	Giannis Tergiakis; 2 of 4 votes Deadlock	Zoi Misel Bakiri; 3 of 4 votes Majority	Liak and the Cover; 3 of 3 votes Majority	Konstantinos Stinis; 2 of 4 votes Deadlock	AC²; 3rd Place	Giannis Grosis; Winner
Eliminated	DAF; Public Vote	Mary Vassiliadou; 2 of 4 votes Deadlock	Giannis Antzouris; 2 of 4 votes Deadlock	Konstantina Aresti; 3 of 5 votes Majority	Lila Trianti; 2 of 4 votes Deadlock	Giannis Tergiakis; 2 of 4 votes Deadlock	Zoi Misel Bakiri; 3 of 4 votes Majority	Liak and the Cover; 3 of 3 votes Majority	Konstantinos Stinis; 2 of 4 votes Deadlock	AC²; 3rd Place	Giannis Grosis; Winner

- ^1 Theofanous was not required to vote as there was already a majority.

=== Live show details ===
==== Week 1 (17 October) ====
Contestants' performances on the first live show
Act	Category (mentor)	Order	Song	Result
Zoi Misel Bakiri	Girls 16-24 (Tsaousopoulos)	1	"I Kardia Sou Petra"	Safe
DAF	Groups (Theofanous)	2	"Cake by the Ocean"	Eliminated
Giannis Tergiakis	Boys 16-24 (Mastoras)	3	"Love Yourself"	Safe
Giannis Antzouris	Over 25s (Aslanidou)	4	"Stin Kardia"	Safe
Giorgos Papanastasiou	Boys 16-24 (Mastoras)	5	"Talk Dirty"	Eliminated
Viky Mariolou	Girls 16-24 (Tsaousopoulos)	6	"I Epimoni Soy"	Eliminated
Lila Trianti	Over 25s (Aslanidou)	7	"Ain't Your Mama"	Safe
Giannis Grosis	Boys 16-24 (Mastoras)	8	"Pou na Exigo"	Safe
Konstantina Aresti	Girls 16-24 (Tsaousopoulos)	9	"Sweet but Psycho"	Safe
Konstantinos Stinis	Over 25s (Aslanidou)	10	"Sign of the Times"	Safe
Liak and the Cover	Groups (Theofanous)	11	"Den Eimai Allos"/"Emeis oi Alloi"	Safe
Dimitris Papatsakonas	Boys 16-24 (Mastoras)	12	"Human"	Safe
Ano Kato	Groups (Theofanous)	13	"Giati"/"Astin Na Leei"	Safe
AC²	Groups (Theofanous)	14	"Shallow"	Safe
Nektarios Rigas	Over 25s (Aslanidou)	15	"Ta Smyrneika Tragoudia"	Eliminated
Mary Vassiliadou	Girls 16-24 (Tsaousopoulos)	16	"Love on the Brain"	Safe
No Final Showdown

==== Week 2 (24 October) ====
Contestants' performances on the second live show
Act	Category (mentor)	Order	Song	Result
Mary Vassiliadou	Girls 16-24 (Tsaousopoulos)	1	"Say My Name"	Bottom two
Konstantinos Stinis	Over 25s (Aslanidou)	2	"Frozen"	Safe
Giannis Tergiakis	Boys 16-24 (Mastoras)	3	"Emena Thes"	Safe
AC²	Groups (Theofanous)	4	"Stay with Me"	Safe
Lila Trianti	Over 25s (Aslanidou)	5	"Where Have You Been"	Safe
Giannis Grosis	Boys 16-24 (Mastoras)	6	"Thes"	Safe
Konstantina Aresti	Girls 16-24 (Tsaousopoulos)	7	"New Rules"	Safe
Liak and the Cover	Groups (Theofanous)	8	"To Metrima"	Safe
Dimitris Papatsakonas	Boys 16-24 (Mastoras)	9	"Wicked Game"	Safe
Ano Kato	Groups (Theofanous)	10	"Pame Psihi Mou"	Safe
Zoi Misel Bakiri	Girls 16-24 (Tsaousopoulos)	11	"Because the Night"	Safe
Giannis Antzouris	Over 25s (Aslanidou)	12	"Thelo Na Me Nioseis"	Bottom two
Sing-off details
Mary Vassiliadou	Girls 16-24 (Tsaousopoulos)	1	"(Simply) The Best"	Eliminated
Giannis Antzouris	Over 25s (Aslanidou)	2	"Giati to Metanioneis"	Safe

Judges' votes to eliminate

- Tsaousopoulos: Giannis Antzouris
- Aslanidou: Mary Vassiliadou
- Mastoras: Mary Vassiliadou
- Theofanous: Giannis Antzouris

With the acts in the sing-off receiving two votes each, the result went to deadlock and reverted to the earlier public vote. Mary Vassiliadou was eliminated as the act with the fewest public votes.

==== Week 3 (31 October) ====
Contestants' performances on the third live show
Act	Category (mentor)	Order	Song	Result
AC²	Groups (Theofanous)	1	"Dream On"	Bottom two
Giannis Tergiakis	Boys 16-24 (Mastoras)	2	"To Kyma"	Safe
Lila Trianti	Over 25s (Aslanidou)	3	"Malo"	Safe
Zoi Misel Bakiri	Girls 16-24 (Tsaousopoulos)	4	"Sta 'Dosa Ola"	Safe
Dimitris Papatsakonas	Boys 16-24 (Mastoras)	5	"Zombie"	Safe
Giannis Antzouris	Over 25s (Aslanidou)	6	"Tora Ti Na To Kano"	Bottom two
Konstantina Aresti	Girls 16-24 (Tsaousopoulos)	7	"Be My Baby"	Safe
Liak and the Cover	Groups (Theofanous)	8	"Tis Lithis To Pigadi"	Safe
Konstantinos Stinis	Over 25s (Aslanidou)	9	"Whole Lotta Love"	Safe
Giannis Grosis	Boys 16-24 (Mastoras)	10	"Pou Na 'Sai"	Safe
Ano Kato	Groups (Theofanous)	11	"Psithiroi Kardias"	Safe
Sing-off details
AC²	Groups (Theofanous)	1	"Say Something"	Safe
Giannis Antzouris	Over 25s (Aslanidou)	2	"Ola S' Agapane"	Eliminated

Judges' votes to eliminate

- Theofanous: Giannis Antzouris
- Aslanidou: AC²
- Mastoras: Giannis Antzouris
- Tsaousopoulos: AC²

With the acts in the sing-off receiving two votes each, the result went to deadlock and reverted to the earlier public vote. Giannis Antzouris was eliminated as the act with the fewest public votes.

==== Week 4 (7 November) ====
- Group Performance, in memory of Giorgos Spanos (Top 10): "Anthropoi Monahoi"/"Tha Se Thimamai"/"An M' Agapas"/"San Me Koitas"/"Epidi S' Agapo"/"Fteme Ki Oi Dio"/"Spasmeno Karavi"/"Odos Aristotelous"/"Prosopika"/"Tha Me Thimithis"/"Aspra Karavia"

Contestants' performances on the fourth live show
Act	Category (mentor)	Order	Song	Result
Dimitris Papatsakonas	Boys 16-24 (Mastoras)	1	"Way Down We Go"	Safe
Ano Kato	Groups (Theofanous)	2	"Milo Gia Sena"	Safe
Zoi Misel Bakiri	Girls 16-24 (Tsaousopoulos)	3	"Whenever, Wherever"	Bottom two
AC²	Groups (Theofanous)	4	"Hello"	Safe
Konstantinos Stinis	Over 25s (Aslanidou)	5	"Madame (Padam Padam)"/"Je ne veux pas travailler"	Safe
Giannis Tergiakis	Boys 16-24 (Mastoras)	6	"Call Out My Name"	Safe
Liak and the Cover	Groups (Theofanous)	7	"Ela Psihoula Mou"	Safe
Lila Trianti	Over 25s (Aslanidou)	8	"Rolling in the Deep"	Safe
Giannis Grosis	Boys 16-24 (Mastoras)	9	"Xenos Gia Senane Ki Ehthros"	Safe
Konstantina Aresti	Girls 16-24 (Tsaousopoulos)	10	"My Kind of Love"	Bottom two
Sing-off details
Zoi Misel Bakiri	Girls 16-24 (Tsaousopoulos)	1	"Black Velvet"	Safe
Konstantina Aresti	Girls 16-24 (Tsaousopoulos)	2	"Someone like You"	Eliminated

Judges' votes to eliminate

- Tsaousopoulos: Konstantina Aresti (×2)
- Mastoras: Zoi Misel Bakiri
- Aslanidou: Konstantina Aresti
- Theofanous: Zoi Misel Bakiri

With the acts in the sing-off receiving two votes each, the result went to Tsaousopoulos and he had to choose who should leave his team. Konstantina Aresti was eliminated.

==== Week 5 (14 November) ====
- Group Performance (Top 9): "Last Christmas"
- Musical guests: FY: "No IQ"/"Celebrity"/"De me Theloun"

Contestants' performances on the fifth live show
Act	Category (mentor)	Order	Song	Result
Giannis Tergiakis	Boys 16-24 (Mastoras)	1	"Counting Stars"	Safe
Liak and the Cover	Groups (Theofanous)	2	"Shima Logou"	Safe
Lila Trianti	Over 25s (Aslanidou)	3	"Lost on You"	Bottom two
Dimitris Papatsakonas	Boys 16-24 (Mastoras)	4	"Oneiro Itane"	Safe
Ano Kato	Groups (Theofanous)	5	"Ki An Se Thelo"	Bottom two
Zoi Misel Bakiri	Girls 16-24 (Tsaousopoulos)	6	"The Power of Love"	Safe
Konstantinos Stinis	Over 25s (Aslanidou)	7	"Fila Me"	Safe
AC²	Groups (Theofanous)	8	"Purple Rain"	Safe
Giannis Grosis	Boys 16-24 (Mastoras)	9	"Poia Nyhta S' Eklepse"	Safe
Sing-off details
Ano Kato	Groups (Theofanous)	1	"Patrida M' Araeyo se"	Safe
Lila Trianti	Over 25s (Aslanidou)	2	"Misise Me"	Eliminated

Judges' votes to eliminate

- Theofanous: Lila Trianti
- Aslanidou: Ano Kato
- Mastoras: Ano Kato
- Tsaousopoulos: Lila Trianti

With the acts in the sing-off receiving two votes each, the result went to deadlock and reverted to the earlier public vote. Lila Trianti was eliminated as the act with the fewest public votes.

==== Week 6 (21 November) ====
Contestants' performances on the sixth live show
Act	Category (mentor)	Order	Song	Result
Liak and the Cover	Groups (Theofanous)	1	"Melisses"	Safe
Zoi Misel Bakiri	Girls 16-24 (Tsaousopoulos)	2	"Against All Odds"	Bottom two
Ano Kato	Groups (Theofanous)	3	"Giftisa Mera"	Safe
Giannis Tergiakis	Boys 16-24 (Mastoras)	4	"Akatallili Skini"	Bottom two
AC²	Groups (Theofanous)	5	"The Time of My Life"	Safe
Dimitris Papatsakonas	Boys 16-24 (Mastoras)	6	"Are You Gonna Be My Girl"	Safe
Konstantinos Stinis	Over 25s (Aslanidou)	7	"Mikri Patrida"	Safe
Giannis Grosis	Boys 16-24 (Mastoras)	8	"Ela Poy Fovamai"	Safe
Sing-off details
Zoi Misel Bakiri	Girls 16-24 (Tsaousopoulos)	1	"Hurt"	Safe
Giannis Tergiakis	Boys 16-24 (Mastoras)	2	"Ki Emeina Edo"	Eliminated

Judges' votes to eliminate

- Tsaousopoulos: Giannis Tergiakis
- Mastoras: Zoi Misel Bakiri
- Aslanidou: Zoi Misel Bakiri
- Theofanous: Giannis Tergiakis

With the acts in the sing-off receiving two votes each, the result went to deadlock and reverted to the earlier public vote. Giannis Tergiakis was eliminated as the act with the fewest public votes.

==== Week 7 (28 November) ====
- Group Performance
1. Christos Mastoras with Giannis Grosis and Dimitris Papatsakonas: "Kai Ti Zitao"
2. Michael Tsaousopoulos with Zoi Misel Bakiri: "Levels"
3. Giorgos Theofanous with AC², Ano Kato and Liak and the Cover: "S' Agapo"
4. Melina Aslanidou with Konstantinos Stinis: "Poso Se Thelo"
- Musical guests: Melisses: "To Kyma"/"Giati"/ "Ena"/"Ola Moiazoun Kalokairi"

Contestants' performances on the seventh live show
Act	Category (mentor)	Order	Song	Result
AC²	Groups (Theofanous)	1	"It's a Man's Man's Man's World"	Bottom two
Dimitris Papatsakonas	Boys 16-24 (Mastoras)	2	"Ayti einai i zoi"	Safe
Konstantinos Stinis	Over 25s (Aslanidou)	3	"The Blower's Daughter"	Safe
Zoi Misel Bakiri	Girls 16-24 (Tsaousopoulos)	4	"I Have Nothing"	Bottom two
Giannis Grosis	Boys 16-24 (Mastoras)	5	"Ta Savvata"	Safe
Liak and the Cover	Groups (Theofanous)	6	"Siga Min Klapso"	Safe
Ano Kato	Groups (Theofanous)	7	"Kaigomai kai Sigoliono"	Safe
Sing-off details
Zoi Misel Bakiri	Girls 16-24 (Tsaousopoulos)	1	"Je suis malade"	Eliminated
AC²	Groups (Theofanous)	2	"Hallelujah"	Safe

Judges' votes to eliminate

- Tsaousopoulos: AC²
- Theofanous: Zoi Misel Bakiri
- Mastoras: Zoi Misel Bakiri
- Aslanidou: Zoi Misel Bakiri

==== Week 8 (5 December) ====
- Opening act: Despina Vandi: "Esto Ligo Akoma"
- Musical guests: Melina Aslanidou: "Eyhi"
- Group Performance: Despina Vandi and Melina Aslanidou: "Agapise Me"/"Hronia Helidonia"/"Vrehei Pali Apopse"/"Ama deite to Feggari"/"Ximeronoi Kyriaki"/"Dos mou T' Athanato Nero"

Contestants' performances on the eighth live show
Act	Category (mentor)	Order	Song (Judges choice)	Order	Song (own choice)	Result
Ano Kato	Groups (Theofanous)	1	"Den Exo Polla"	7	"Madissa"	Bottom two
AC²	Groups (Theofanous)	2	""Perfect Duet" version"	8	"Imagine"	Safe
Giannis Grosis	Boys 16-24 (Mastoras)	3	"Ximeroni"	9	"Poios na Sygkrithei Mazi sou"	Safe
Konstantinos Stinis	Over 25s (Aslanidou)	4	"Unchain My Heart"	10	"Mpagasas"	Safe
Dimitris Papatsakonas	Boys 16-24 (Mastoras)	5	"Agapi"	11	"Dance with Somebody"	Safe
Liak and the Cover	Groups (Theofanous)	6	"Tha Xatho"	12	"Den Mporo"	Bottom two
Sing-off details
Ano Kato	Groups (Theofanous)	1	"Anestaki"			Safe
Liak and the Cover	Groups (Theofanous)	2	"Mia apo autes tis Meres"			Eliminated

Judges' votes to eliminate

- Tsaousopoulos: Liak and the Cover
- Mastoras: Liak and the Cover
- Aslanidou: Liak and the Cover
- Theofanous was not required to vote as there was already a majority.

==== Week 9: Semi-Final (11 December) ====
- Musical guests: Dimitris Basis and Christos Mastoras: "Ena Lepto"
- Musical guests: Tamta: "Replay"/"Sex With Your Ex"/"Senorita"

Contestants' performances on the ninth live show
Act	Category (mentor)	Order	First Song	Order	Second Song	Result
Ano Kato	Groups (Theofanous)	1	"Lene"	6	"Xafnikos Erotas"	Eliminated
AC²	Groups (Theofanous)	2	"Chandelier"	7	"Creep"	Bottom three
Konstantinos Stinis	Over 25s (Aslanidou)	3	"Hotel California"	8	"O Amlet Tis Selinis"	Bottom three
Giannis Grosis	Boys 16-24 (Mastoras)	4	"Pote Tha Se Do"	9	"Grande amore"	Safe
Dimitris Papatsakonas	Boys 16-24 (Mastoras)	5	"Rebel Yell"	10	"The Sound of Silence"	Safe
Sing-off details
AC²	Groups (Theofanous)	1	"Listen"			Safe
Konstantinos Stinis	Over 25s (Aslanidou)	2	"Angie"			Eliminated

Judges' votes to send through to the final

- Theofanous: AC²
- Aslanidou: Konstantinos Stinis
- Tsaousopoulos: AC²
- Mastoras: Konstantinos Stinis

With the acts in the sing-off receiving two votes each, the result went to deadlock and reverted to the earlier public vote. Konstantinos Stinis was eliminated as the act with the fewest public votes.

==== Week 10: Final (18 December) ====
- Opening act: Konstantinos Stinis, Giannis Tergiakis and Giorgos Papanastasiou: "Santa Claus Is Comin' to Town", Zoi Misel Bakiri, Konstantina Aresti, Mary Vassiliadou and Lila Trianti: "All I Want for Christmas Is You"
- Group Performance: Aris Makris, Mary Vassiliadou, Lila Trianti, Zoi Misel Bakiri, Konstantina Aresti, Konstantinos Stinis, Giannis Tergiakis, Ano Kato and Giorgos Papanastasiou: "Do They Know It's Christmas?"
- Group Performance: Giorgos Theofanous, Melina Aslanidou, Christos Mastoras and Despina Vandi and with Aris Makris and some finalists of The X Factor Greece 6: "Adikrista"/"Den Teleiosame"/"Ela na me Teleioseis"/"Kokkini Grammi"/"Tha 'Prepe"/"Thymos"/"Misise Me"/"Pou na 'sai"/"Feggari Mou"/"Ekrypsa to Prosopo mou"/"Paliokairos"/"To Kyma"/"Noima"/"O Dikos mou o Dromos"/"De Milame"/"Den ehei Sidera i Kardia sou"/"Tremo"/"Hamogelase"/"S' Agapo"

Contestants' performances on the final live show
Act	Category (mentor)	Order	First song	Order	Song of the series	Result
Dimitris Papatsakonas	Boys 16-24 (Mastoras)	1	"Take Me to Church"	7	"The House of the Rising Sun"	Runner-up
AC²	Groups (Theofanous)	2	"The Prayer"	N/A	N/A (already eliminated)	Third place
Giannis Grosis	Boys 16-24 (Mastoras)	3	"Ena Gramma"	8	"I Nyhta Dyo Kommatia"	Winner

Contestants' sang duets between them
Act	Order	song
AC² & Dimitris Papatsakonas	4	"We Will Rock You"/"Let Me Entertain You"
Dimitris Papatsakonas & Giannis Grosis	5	"Tonight"/"Simera"
Giannis Grosis & AC²	6	"An Thimithis to Oneiro mou"/"The Honeymoon song"
