= ONAR =

- Origin: Athens, Greece
- Genres: Pop rock, alternative rock
- Years active: 1998 – present
- Labels: EMI; Universal; Konkret Promo; Antler Subway
- Members: Lefteris Pliatsikas; Kleoniki Xrysanthakopoulou; Lia Michailidou; Loukas Kalantzakos

ONAR (in Greek: ΟΝΑΡ), is a Greek pop rock group, primarily composed by Lefteris Pliatsikas throughout the band's career. The band's name is the ancient Greek word for "dream".

== History ==
The band was formed in 1998. In 1999, they released their first LP, produced by Pliatsikas' brother, renowned Greek songwriter Filippos Pliatsikas, under the title "To ergo pou paizoun ta matia sou". From the very first instant, the album won positive reviews. Songs such as "Me tromazeis", "Hartina Fanaria", "Galazies Erwmenes" became popular, making the LP Gold.

In 2000 they released their second album entitled "Min petas tha se doun", which marked the participation of Teresa Salgueiro of Madredeus in a song based on a poem by Federico García Lorca. Manos Ksydous, another renown Greek songwriter, also participated with two songs. This LP had a notable commercial success, as well.

Their next work was released in 2003 and is titled "Aladdin...Teliosan Oi Efhes sou". The album's hit song was "Den hrostao se kanena" (which had been pre-released as a CD single and had already become golden) with the participation of Vasilis Papakonstantinou and later an adaptation to αν old folk song called "Istoria mou". Other songs that stood out from this record were "Na sai kala", "Posa ploia eho hasei" and "Fisaei sta stavrodromia tou kosmou" (based on a poem by Tasos Livaditis).

In the next three years, they released two more albums, "Stin Αkri Τis Gis" and "Pou Τaksideveis" containing popular songs such as "Machairia tora ta filia sou", "Kymata tou Aigaiou", "Mi fevgeis", and "Peta psila".

In 2007 they released an album titled "Tipota Den Einai Opos Fainetai", from which songs such as "An m'agapas", "Kaseta" (lyrics by Efstathia), and "Perasmena mesanihta" stood out.

== Touring and collaborations ==
ONAR have been touring in Greece ever since they released their first LP and they have participated in all the major festivals of Greece. They have collaborated with some of the most important representatives of the Greek pop-rock scene such as: Filippos Pliatsikas, Lavrentis Machairitsas, Dionysis Tsaknis, Socrates Drank the Conium, Vasilis Papakonstantinou, Sakis Boulas, and Lakis Papadopoulos. They have also participated in concerts dedicated to Lefteris Papadopoulos in Athens and Salonica and they have given concerts in Megaro Moussikis under the artistic supervision of George Dalaras.

== Band members ==
=== Current members ===
- Lefteris Pliatsikas (guitar, vocals)
- Kleoniki Xrysanthakopoulou (vocals, keyboards)
- Lia Michailidou (keyboards, bass synth)
- Loukas Kalantzakos (drums)

=== Former members ===
- Peny Ramantani (vocals)
- Michael Kexagias (bass)
- Stelios Makryplidis (guitar)
- Kosmas Brousalis (drums)
- Diamantis Karagiannakidis (keyboards)
- Hlias Karoumpalis (sound technician)

== Discography ==
- 1999 - "To Ergo Pou Paizoun Ta Matia Sou" (Harvest)
- 2000 - "Min Petas Tha Se doun" (Minos-EMI)
- 2002 - "Aladdin...Teliosan Oi Efhes Sou" (Harvest)
- 2003 - "Stin Akri Tis Gis" (Mercury)
- 2004 - "Ton Oniron Ta Hromata" (Compilation) (Harvest, EMI)
- 2006 - "Pou Taxideveis" (Mercury)
- 2007 - "Tipota Den Einai Opos Fainetai" (Lyra)
- 2008 - "14 Megala Tragoudia" (Compilation) (EMI Records Ltd.)
- 2009 - "De Mporo Na Haramiso Alli Anasa" (Virus Music)
- 2010 - "Osa Antio Mas Menoun" (Legend Recordings)
- 2017 - "17" (Live Album) (Spider Music)
