= Babis Stokas =

Greek singer and songwriter

- Born: March 8, 1968 (age 58); Wuppertal, West Germany
- Origin: Athens, Greece
- Genres: Entekhno, rock, laiko
- Occupations: Musician, songwriter
- Instruments: Guitar, singing
- Years active: 1990–present

Babis Stokas (Greek: Μπάμπης Στόκας) is a Greek singer and songwriter. He was a founding member of the entekhno/rock group Pyx Lax (Πυξ Λαξ), in which he was lead singer, lyricist, and composer from 1989 until the dissolution of the band in 2004. Since then he has performed as a solo artist.

== Career ==
Stokas released his first personal album, Poulia tis Nychtas, in 2001, while Pyx Lax were still active.

After Pyx Lax were dissolved in 2004(now active), he formed his own band, called "The Gamma plan", in collaboration with which he released, in March 2006, his second studio album, Stin Akri tis Giortis. In 2008, his live album Tragoudiste, min Drepeste, achieved gold status sales. His third studio album, Volta, was released in 2010.

Babis Stokas has cooperated, as a solo artist, with many important Greek singers and composers, such as George Dalaras, Lavrentis Machairitsas, Katsimihas Brothers, Stamatis Kraounakis, Pantelis Thalassinos, Melina Aslanidou and many more.

== Discography ==
Albums

- Poulia tis Nychtas (Πουλιά της Νύχτας) [2001]
- Stin Akri tis Giortis (Στην Άκρη της Γιορτής), [2006]
- Tragoudiste, min Drepeste (Τραγουδήστε, μην Ντρέπεστε) live, [2008]
- Volta (Βόλτα), [2010]
- I Avli ton Trelon (Η αυλή των τρελών) [2012]
- Fylaki ypsistis asfaleias (Φυλακή υψίστης ασφαλείας) [2017] (Babis Stokas & Giorgos Dalaras)
- Ki erhetai i Agapi ksana (Κι έρχεται η αγάπη ξανά) [2023]

Cd Singles

- Ta Nisia tis Irinis (Τα Νησιά της Ειρήνης), [2003]
