= I Muvrini =

Folk music group from Corsica, France

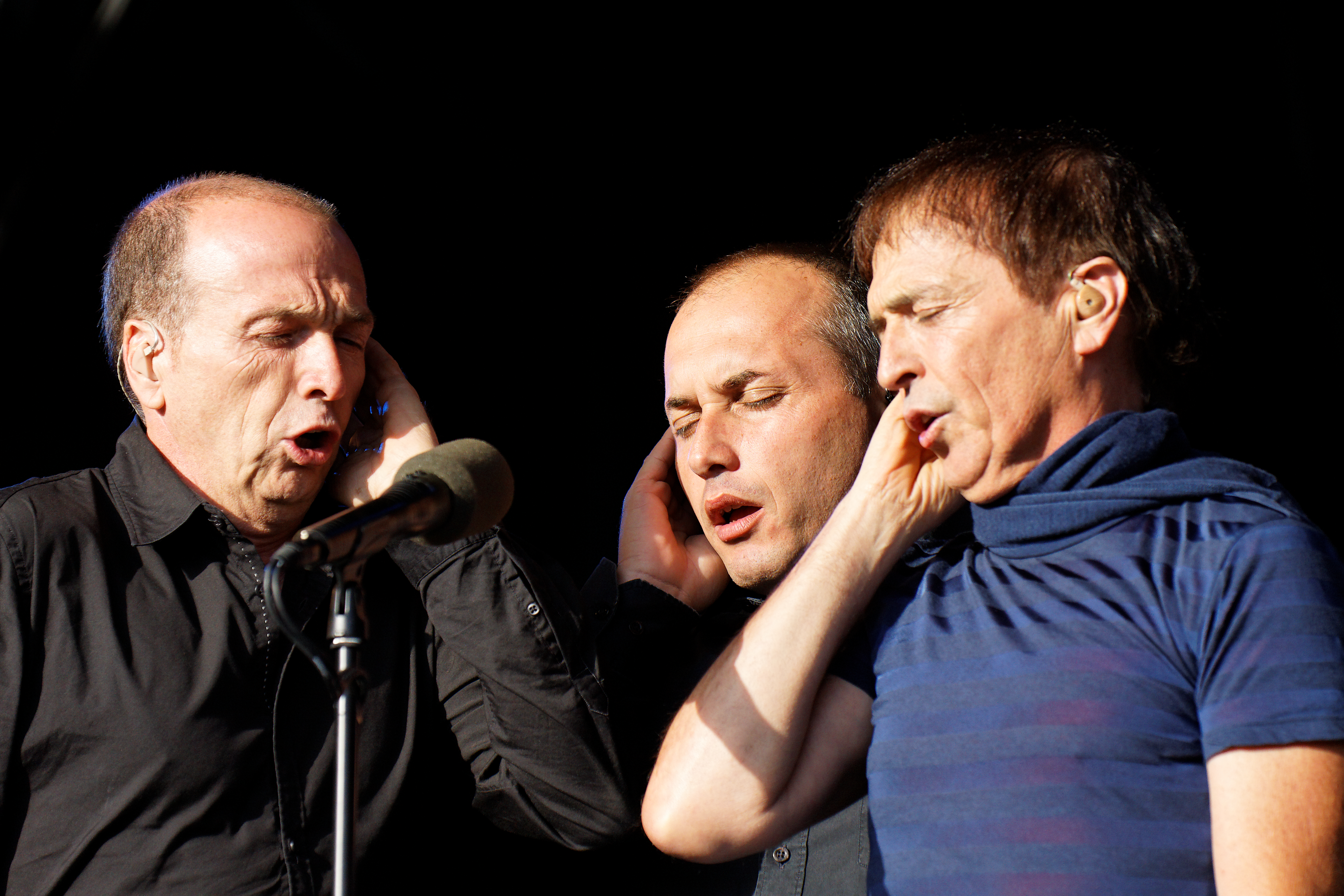

Background information
- Origin: Corsica
- Genres: Folk, worldbeat
- Years active: 1979–present
- Members: Alain Bernardini; Jean François Bernardini; Stéphane Mangiantini

I Muvrini is a Corsican folk music group, who sing traditional Corsican music (Polyphony) in their native Corsican language.

== History ==
The group was formed in the early 1980s by the brothers Jean-François Bernardini and Alain Bernardini both born in the village of Tagliu-Isulacciu in the north of Corsica. They are named after a species of wild sheep (mouflon) which live in the mountains of Corsica.

The Bernardini brothers were introduced to traditional Corsican music at an early age by their father, Ghjuliu, who was a well-known poet and singer. They recorded their first single with their father in collaboration with the group Canta u Populu Corsu. Ghjuliu Bernardini died in December 1977 and I Muvrini's first album, I Muvrini ... ti ringrazianu, which was released in 1979, was dedicated to their father's memory.

In 2000, I Muvrini joined up with Sting to record "Terre d'Oru" (English: "Fields of Gold").

Throughout their career they have promoted the Corsican language and culture, much like the work pioneered by Les Nouvelles Polyphonies corses.

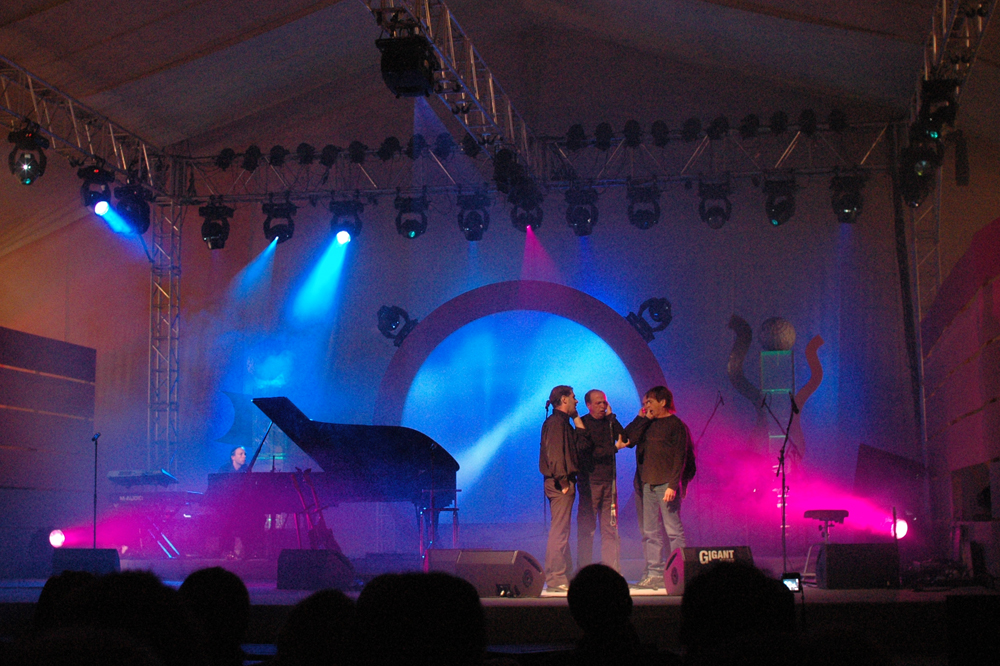
A concert in Warszaw, September 2008

== Selected discography ==
=== Studio albums ===
- 1979 - ...Ti ringrazianu
- 1980 - Anu da vultà
- 1981 - ...È campà quì
- 1984 - Lacrime
- 1985 - 85
- 1986 - À l'encre rouge
- 1988 - Pè l'amore di tè...
- 1989 - Quorum
- 1991 - À voce rivolta
- 1993 - Noi
- 1995 - Curagiu
- 1998 - Leia
- 2002 - Umani
- 2005 - Alma
- 2007 - I Muvrini et les 500 choristes
- 2010 - Gioia
- 2012 - Imaginà
- 2015 - Invicta
- 2016 - Pianetta
- 2017 - Luciole
- 2019 - Portu in core
- 2022 - Piu forti

=== Compilation albums ===
- 1998 - Sò
- 2000 - Pulifunie
- 2000 - A strada
- 2013 - Best of (3 CDs)

=== Live albums ===
- 1990 - In core
- 1994 - Zenith 93
- 1996 - Bercy 96
- 2006 - ALMA 2005

=== Videos / DVDs ===
- I Muvrini at Bercy '96
- Giru FR3
- Zenith '92
- Terra
- Alma 2005

=== Collaborations ===
- 1999 - Άσε την εικόνα να μιλάει ("Let the Picture Speak") with Pyx Lax.

== Awards and nominations ==
Year	Nominee / work	Award	Result
1997	I Muvrini à Bercy	Victoires de la Musique for Traditional Music Album of the Year	Won
2003	Umani	Victoires de la Musique for Traditional Music/World Music Album of the Year	Won
