= Theodosia Tsatsou =

Greek singer (born 1969)

- Born: 7 September 1969 (age 56); Melbourne, Victoria, Australia
- Origin: Thessaloniki, Greece
- Genres: Rock
- Occupations: Singer-songwriter, composer
- Instruments: Vocals, lyrics, composition
- Years active: 1996–present
- Website: www.tsatsou.com

Theodosia Tsatsou (Greek: Θεοδοσία Τσάτσου; born 7 September 1969) is a Greek singer, known for her songs with the band Ble, and also for her solo career.

== Biography ==
Theodosia Tsatsou was born and raised in Melbourne. Having studied music and dancing, she has participated in small groups and theatrical teams which dealt with school representations and extracts of known musicals. After finishing high school, she returned to Greece, making Thessaloniki her permanent residence, where she finished her studies in the Theatre of Northern Greece. Moreover, she completed her musical studies and later on, she graduated from the Aristotelio University of Thessaloniki in English literature.

In Thessaloniki, she met up with George Papapostolou, founding member of group Ble, and this acquaintance led to the collaboration of the two. Ble circulated, in 1996, the album Enoches, in which Theodosia undertook the vocals. The disk has been particularly successful, with tracks such as "Niotho enoxes" ("I Feel Guilty"), "Fovamai" ("I Am Afraid") and "Esi den zeis pouthena" ("You Live Nowhere") which were often played in the radio and they became quite popular with the Greek public. The group presented material with pop/rock and blues/funk elements, which was the style of Theodosia's vocals and her interpretation of the songs.

However, Theodosia decided to quit the band the next year and began her solo effort in 1999 with the disk Ipoptos Kosmos (Suspicious World), which was the first disk in which Theodosia participated musically and also lyrically. It is a musical unity which celebrates the circle of life, entering the depth of thought and rising to the peak of the feeling. With the circulation of Ipoptos Kosmos, Theodosia performed at the music scene "Metro", while she was touring across Greece. It was the summer of the same year when she participated in the concert of "The Parliament of the Teenagers" in Kallimarmaro, Athens.

During the next two years, she participated on the album of the band Pyx Lax, "Τα δοκάρια στο γρασίδι περιμένουν τα παιδιά" (The Climbing Frames on the Grass Are Waiting For the Children), interpreting along with them the songs "Mono gia ekini mi mou les" (a.k.a. Do not tell me about her) and "Sto ema mou alazei o keros" ("In My Blood, the Weather Changes"). She toured with the band for a while promoting the songs successfully. She participated with the band "Mode Plagal", " III", singing with them "Ta pedia tis gitonias sou"(a.k.a. The children of your neighborhood). Moreover, she participated with another rock band "Maskes" performing the song "Agaan Graan" in the album "Gefires stis taratses"(a.k.a. Bridges in flat roofs).

Along with all that, she was preparing the material of her next album in which she chose to work with Giannis Nastas (Xaxakes) in the orchestration and the production of the album in which she sang songs written by her, moreover by Kleon Antoniou (Mode Plagal) and Giorgos Michas. The album was called "Kokkino" (a.k.a. Red) and was released during the spring of 2002. This album holds a variety of songs, that move through ballads such as "Pou na ‘se tora" (a.k.a. Where are you now), "Thalasa" (a.k.a. The sea) to strong rhythms and beat in "Kokkino" and "Let the music".

The winter of 2006, her new album, "Sti leoforo tis Evas" (a.k.a. In Eve's highway) brought about a new sound and Theodosia experimented once again with music and lyrics with the assistance in composition and orchestration of Paul Stefanidis. The sound, that she's experimenting with, holds songs such as "Oriona",”Sti leoforo tis Evas" (a.k.a. In Eve's highway) and "Kato apo ti zoni" (a.k.a. Under the belt) where Theodosia raps. "Pios ise esi pou me kitas" (a.k.a. Who are you that looking at me) is the song that made the album well-known with the lyrics of Giota Davlara. The experimenting and the innovating approach are obvious in all of the ten compositions. The concept of a united idea, that is to say the internal, feminine search of self-knowledge and sentimental justice, is extremely apparent in the ballad "Thelo na se do" (a.k.a. I want to see you), "Ela" (a.k.a. Come on) and "Take me with you".

From February 2007 and for few performances, Theodosia made live appearances in the music scene "Metro", along with Manos Pirovolakis, and attempted more ethnic approach to her songs with the participation of the Cretan Lyra.

Her new album under the title "A-gapisou," which translates to "Love Yourself" in English, was released in July 2009. It is a rock album written and performed by Theodosia with the assistance of Greek musician Manolis Karantinis and his bouzouki on five of the songs. The song "Babalou" discusses her new name and new identity. "Just Love the Man" is about musician John Lennon.

== Discography ==
Personal albums

- 1996 – Enoches (Ble) (freely translated to "Feelings of guilt")
- 1999 – Ipoptos Kosmos (freely translated to "Suspect world")
- 2002 – Kokkino (Red)
- 2006 – Sti leoforo tis Evas (freely translated to "On Eve's highway")
- 2006 – Theodosia, Best of
- 2009 – A-gapisou (freely translated to "Love yourself")
