= Filippos Pliatsikas =

Greek musician, composer and lyricist

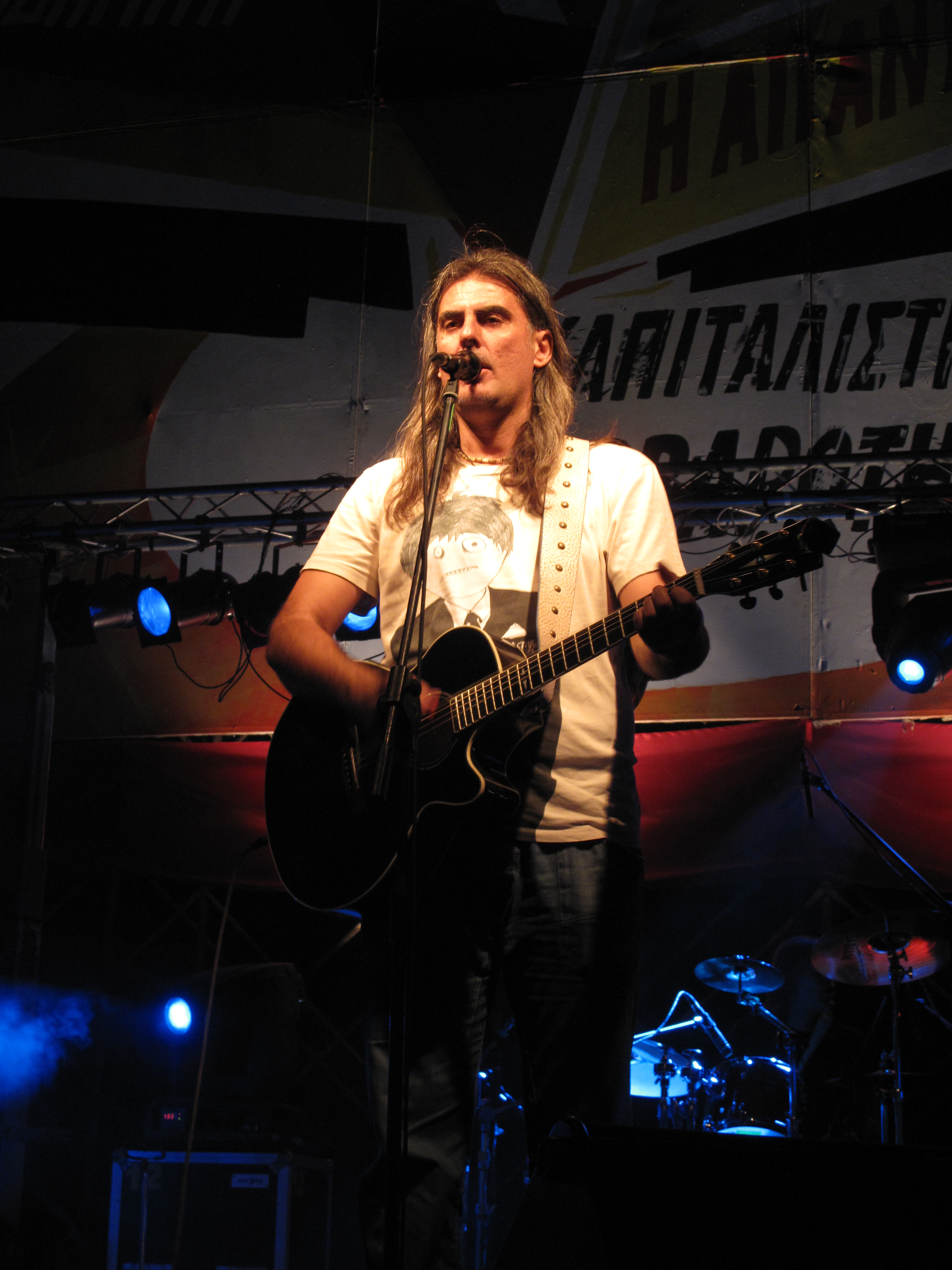
- Filippos Pliatsikas performing live in Patras (2009)

Background information
- Born: 13 August 1967 (age 58); Athens, Greece
- Genres: Entekhno, pop rock
- Occupations: Musician, songwriter
- Instruments: Guitar, singing
- Years active: 1989–present
- Website: www.pliatsikas.com

Filippos Pliatsikas (Greek: Φίλιππος Πλιάτσικας) is a Greek musician, composer and lyricist. He was the main composer, lyricist, and lead singer of the entekhno rock group Pyx Lax (Πυξ Λαξ) and now a solo artist.

== Career ==
Filippos Pliatsikas was born in Athens and has been involved in music from the age of 12. From 1989 he was a founding member of the most popular band in Greece "Pyx Lax" and until 2004 when the band broke up, he wrote and sang songs like “I Palies Agapes Pane Sto Paradiso”, “Monaxia Mou Ola” “Epapses Agapi Na Thimizis” and many more. His solo career since 2004 has been equally impressive and his albums continue to reach gold and platinum sales. Songs like “Ti Den Emathe O Theos”, “Taxidevontas Me Allo Ixo- recorded from the live performance from Athens Concert Hall “Megaron” with the ERT classical orchestra of Contemporary Music, “Ena Vrochero Taxi”, the album “Omnia” which included tracks like “Pyos Exi Logo Stin Agapi”, “An Tha Borousa To Kosmo Na Allaza”, “Poli Chioni” and more.

On his musical journey, he has collaborated with artists like R.E.M., Sting, Eric Burdon, Marc Almond, Steve Wynn, Gordon Gano, Loop Guru, I Muvrini, Haroula Alexiou, Haris and Panos Katsimihas, Dionisis Tsaknis, Vasilis Kazoulis, Vasilis Karas, Lavrentis Machairitsas, Dimitris Mitropanos and many more. Filippos has appeared in many concerts both in Greece and abroad and continues to do so.

In 2005 and 2006, he collaborated with Lavrentis Machairitsas and Dionysis Tsaknis in shows all over Greece. This two-year collaboration ended with a big show called “25 years – Our Rock” with guests from all the most important singers in the industry. In the summer of 2006, Filippos took part in a road festival called “Oniro Electricis Nychtas” and travelled all over Greece with Manolis Famellos, ONAR, Theodoris Kontakos (Kos K).

In the spring of 2007, Filippos released one of his most successful albums to date in his personal career called “Omnia”. This platinum album put Filippos in a higher league in terms of his live performances. This was seen in his three sold-out concerts with the Contemporary Orchestra of ERT in Greece’s renowned Lycabettus theatre, where 22.000 fans justified his journey and choice. In the winter of 2008, he toured all over Greece and Cyprus with Vasilis Kazoulis where more than 100.000 fans attended these successful shows.

In 2009, he released his next album “Ballerinas Epitreponte” and he toured in 10 European cities: London, Leicester, Düsseldorf, Frankfurt, Stuttgart, Munich, Brussels, Amsterdam, Nicosia and Lemesos. In the same year he kicked off his summer tour in the Karaiskaki Stadium with Sinead O'Connor and guest starring: Kostis Maraveyas, Gordon Gano (Violent Femmes) and MC Yinka. At the end of 2010, he released his album “Tin Alitheia Na Po” which was distributed for free via the internet, something done for the first time in the Greek music industry. This album included 15 tracks which portrayed his truth, his reality. He experimented with various sounds and, by using a Gospel choir from San Diego mixed with musicians from Epirus, he managed to make his songs a journey once again. In light of the album, he performed shows from December 2010 to the spring of 2011.

In 2011, Pyx Lax reunited. These old friends reunited on stage for a series of shows. This was considered the music event of the year. They travelled to the biggest cities in Greece and presented a show unlike one ever performed in Greece before. This was the case as it broke the record of the most ticket sales ever sold by Greek artists. The highlights of the tour were in the Olympic Stadium in Athens which had an audience of 80.000 people and in the Kaftanzoglio Stadium in Thessaloniki with an audience of 50.000 people. The Pix Lax tour came to an end with three shows in America (New York, Chicago, Boston) and one in Canada (Toronto) which were performed in historic venues (Terminal 5 and House of Blues).

In March 2012, Filippos released his new album titled "Prosochii sto Keno" and the song "Pou na pame" has already started its own journey.

== Discography ==
=== Personal Albums ===
- Ena Vrochero Taxi - A Rainy Taxi – 2002
- Ti Den Emathe O Theos - What God Did Not Learn – 2005
- Taxidevontas Me Allon Icho - Travelling With Another Sound – 2006
- Omnia - Everything – 2007
- Ballarines Epitreponte - Ballerinas Are Allowed – 2009
- Tin Alithia Na Po - To Tell The Truth – 2010
- Prosoxi Sto Keno - Mind The Gap – 2012

=== PYX-LAX Albums ===
- Ti Allo Na Pis Pio Apla – 1990
- Zoriky Kery – 1991
- O Ilios Tou Chimona Me Melancholi
- Gia Tous Prinkipes Tis Dytikis Ochthis
- O Baboulas Tragoudai Monos Tis Nychtes
- Nihterinos Peripatos Stin Iera Odo – 1997 – With Giorgos Dalaras
- Live Recording from Iera Odo – 1997 – With George Dalaras
- Paixe Paliatso Ta Tragoudia Sou Telionoun – 1997
- O Erotas Koimithike Noris – 1998
- Stilvi – 1998
- Ase tin Ikona Na Milai – 1999 – with I Muvrini/ Featuring Sting
- Netrino – 1999 with Lakis Papadopoulos
- Iparhoun Chrisopsara Edo? – 1999
- Ta Dokaria Sto Grasidi Perimenoun Ta Pedia – 2001
- Apo Edo Ki Apo Ki – 2002
- Charoumeny Stin Poli Ton Trelon – 2003
- Telos – Live from Lykabettus – 2004
- Hey Man Kyta Brosta – Live – 2011
