= Lavrentis Machairitsas =

Greek rock musician (1956–2019)

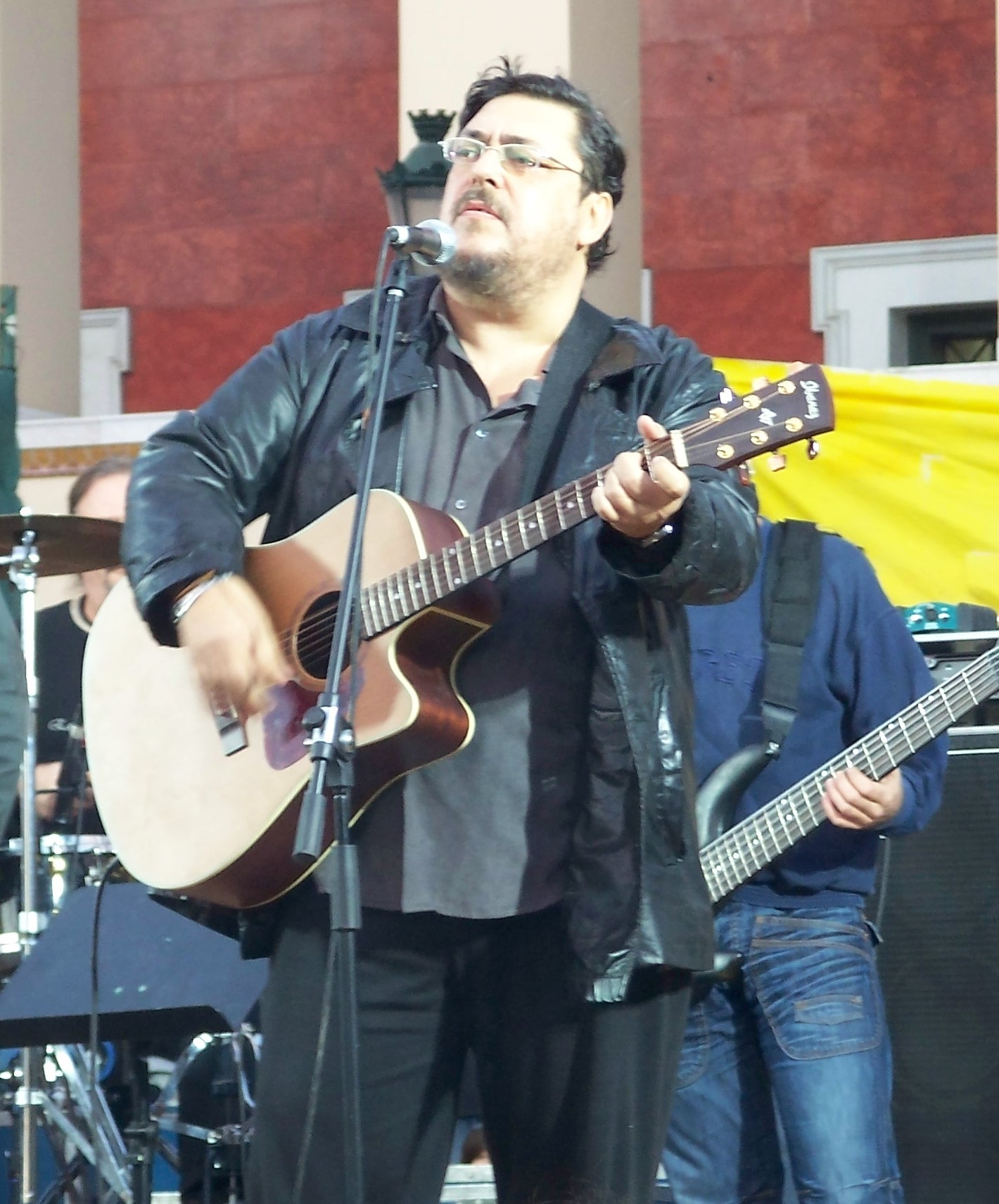

Background information
- Born: 5 November 1956; Nea Ionia, Magnesia, Kingdom of Greece
- Origin: Nea Ionia, Magnesia, Greece
- Died: 9 September 2019 (aged 62) Pteleos, Greece
- Genre: Rock
- Occupations: Musician, songwriter
- Instruments: Guitar, singing
- Years active: 1978–2019

Lavrentis Machairitsas (Greek: Λαυρέντης Μαχαιρίτσας; 5 November 1956 – 9 September 2019) was a Greek rock musician.

== Biography ==
=== Early years ===
Machairitsas was born on 5 November 1956, in Nea Ionia, Magnesia and began taking piano lessons at the age of six. These lessons lasted a year. At the age of nine he bought his first record, Help! by the Beatles. Three years later, he discovered Revolver by the Beatles.

His first job was at a record store, but because of his lack of punctuality he was fired. He disliked school, and after he started a fight with one of his teachers, he was expelled and excluded from all high schools. He went through countless jobs and served in the army for 14 months.

=== Termites ===
When he left the army, he started singing with Panos Tzabelas in Syntrofia. At the age of 20 he (as Larry), Pavlos Kirkilis (Paul), Takis Bassalakis (Jimmy), and Adonis Mitzelos formed a band called P.L.J. They moved to Paris, hoping for a musical career outside Greece. In 1982, their first album, Armageddon, with English lyrics and long instrumental sections in an art rock or prog rock style, produced by Giannis Doulamis, was released by PolyGram. The album did not meet with much success.

For their second album, they changed their name to Termites and started singing in Greek. In 1984, their third record had a positive reception, and they began gaining in popularity. Giorgos Ntalaras is also featured in this album on the track "Skoni" ("Dust", an elegiac song about cocaine addiction) which became a huge hit. In 1986 they released their fourth album. The last studio record from Termites was "Perimenontas Tin Vrochi" (Waiting For the Rain), released in 1988.

=== Solo career ===
Machairitsas began his solo career in 1989 as a writer and performer. His first album was O Magapas Kai I Sagapo, released by Minos-EMI, which was not well received. However his follow-up Didymoteicho Blues in 1991, including the song of the same name featuring Ntalaras once again, was certified Gold.

Rixe Kokkino Stin Nichta was released in 1993 and featured many other artists such as Vasilis Papakonstantinou. Since then he has been working closely with Dionysis Tsaknis, another well known Greek musician. After performing a large number of live appearances together, they released the live album H Nyhta Tha To Pei.

In 1995, he released Parathyra Pou Kourase I Thea. This was followed by Pafsilypon, which he released in 1996 with many other artists. Three years later, he released Etsi Drapetevo Ap' Tis Parees, again with many well-known musicians, especially in the song "Kai Ti Zitao". He then composed the music for the movie Enas Kai Enas. In 2001 he released To Dialeimma Krataei Dyo Zoes, which included songs such as "Matia Dihos Logiki", "Ela Psihoula Mou" and "O Egokentrikos". In 2002 he wrote the music for Giannis Kotsiras' album Xylino Alogaki. His next release was the two-disk album Tosa Chronia Mia Anasa (2007). It included a new song (the title song) and 34 of his career's greatest hits, being his first "best of" album.

Besides the many albums, Machairitsas and Tsaknis hold many concerts all over Greece during the summer. He has also held concerts with Eleftheria Arvanitaki, Haris Alexiou, Vasilis Papakonstantinou, Pyx Lax, Christos Thivaios and many more

Machairitsas continued to work in Greek rock music and to compose.

In 2016, Machairitsas performed at the Kaye Playhouse at Hunter College in New York during AKTINA's Greek Music Journey concert series.

=== Death ===
Machairitsas died of a heart attack in his sleep, at his home in Pteleos, on 9 September 2019, at age 62.

== Discography ==
Year	Title	Certification
1989	O Magapas kai i Sagapo	-
1991	Didymoteicho Blues	Gold
1993	Rixe Kokkino Sti Nyhta	-
1994	H Nyhta Tha To Pei (Live) with Dionysis Tsaknis	-
1995	Parathyra Pou Kourase i Thea	-
1997	Pafsilipon	Platinum
1999	Etsi Drapetevo Apo Tis Parees	-
2000	Ena ki Enas (OST)	-
2001	To Dialeimma Krataei Dyo Zoes	Platinum
2001	Efapax (cd-single) with Yannis Kotsiras	Gold
2003	Sto Afierono	-
2004	Hreiazetai Ena Thavma Edo (cd-single) with D. Tsaknis & Filippos Pliatsikas	-
2005	Alkyonides Meres (Live)	-
2006	Iroes Me Carbon	-
2007	Tosa Hronia Mia Anasa (Best of)	Gold
2009	Pethaino Yia Sena (OST)	-
2010	H Enohi ton Amnon	Platinum
2012	Oi Aggeloi Zoun Akomi Sti Mesogeio	-
2014	Mia Trypa Ston Kairo... Kyrie Mano	-
2017	Allaxan Polla	-
2019	Psema sto psema	-

== Sources ==
- https://web.archive.org/web/20110106045532/http://www.machairitsas.gr/
- http://portal.kithara.gr/modules.php?name=kiSongdb&file=index&func=bio&who=maxairitsas+laurentgs
- https://web.archive.org/web/20110305005330/http://vidq.gr/maxairitsas/viografiko.htm (Greek)
