= Katsimihas Brothers =

Haris and Panos Katsimihas
- Born: October 19, 1952 (age 73)
- Origin: Athens, Attiki, Greece
- Genres: Rock
- Occupations: musician, songwriter, singer
- Years active: 1985–present

Haris and Panos Katsimihas (Greek: Χάρης/Πάνος Κατσιμίχας), also known as the Katsimihas brothers (Αδελφοί Κατσιμίχα; Κατσιμίχα is the genitive case of Κατσιμίχας) or Katsimiheoi (Κατσιμιχαίοι) (born in Athens, October 1952), are two Greek singer songwriters, who for the greatest part of their music career, performed as a duet. The Katsimihas brothers are twins. Panos is 10 minutes older than Haris.

== Early life ==
They were born in Athens and grew up in the Agios Dimitrios and Nea Smirni area, while they spent their youth working in West Germany.

Initially, they became known from their participation in a music competition in Corfu, organised by Manos Hadjidakis in 1982, where they won the competition with the song "Μια βραδιά στο λούκι". Their first record, "Zesta Pota", was produced in 1985 by Manolis Rasoulis.

== Career ==
In a career spanning 40 years, the brothers have produced their own records featuring their own compositions. They have appeared live in Athens and produced records with other musicians. In 2001 Haris stopped his live performances, unlike Panos. They re-united with a concert at the Olympic Stadium.

== Discography ==
- 1985-Zesta Pota
- 1987-Otan sou leo portokali na vgeneis
- 1989-Aprili Psefti
- 1992-I monaxia tou Schoinovati
- 1994-Tis Agapis Machairia
- 1996-I Agelasti Politeia kai oi Kalikantzaroi
- 1997-Parallili Diskografia
- 2000-Trypies Simaies
- 2001-20 Chronia Live
- 2002-Stous Elaiones tis Agapis
- 2006-Mousiki Aftoviografia
