= Natalia Germanou production discography =

This list features the production discography of Natalia Germanou. She wrote the lyrics for the following songs.

== Production Discography ==
=== 1990 ===
==== Mando - Ptisi Gia Dio ====
- Pos

=== 1991 ===
==== Kostas Charitodiplomenos - Kaigomai ====
- Fyge
- Moro Mou
- Kane Paihnidi

==== Thanos Kalliris - Se Katadikazo ====
- Fevgo
- Se Katadikazo
- Oi Adres Protimoun Tis Ksanthies
- Kalinihta

=== 1992 ===
==== Mando - Esthisis ====
- Mesanihta

==== Sakis Rouvas - Min Adistekese ====
- Dose Mou Mia Nihta
- Min Adistekese

==== Katy Garbi - Tou Feggariou Anapnoes ====
- Pes To M’ Ena Fili

==== Sabrina - Stin Agkalia Mou Ela ====
- Pagida

==== Yiannis Koutras - Ksafnika ====
- Ki Arhizis To Kryfto

==== Vaggelis Spanakakis - Akrivos ====
- Ase Me Emena
- Andriki Kolonia

=== 1993 ===
==== Sabrina - Eleftheri ====
- Ftais
- Glikia
- Ase Me
- Gia Sou
- Efialtis

==== Labis Livieratos - As Ixa Ti Dinami ====
- Kleftra

==== Thanos Kalliris - Ena Psema Gia To Telos ====
- Krata Ena Psema Gia To Telos
- Apomakrinese
- O Palios Ine Allios
- Se Miso
- Min Tolmisis

==== Sakis Rouvas - Gia Sena ====
- Tha S’ Ekdikitho

==== Valeria Christodoulidou - Valeria ====
- I Douli Tou Christou

=== 1994 ===
==== Doukissa - O Erotas Einai Ellinas ====
- Kalo Alla Ligo
- Fovamai
- Amartoli Mou Paraskevi

==== Victoria Halkiti - Erotas Einai ====
- Erotas Einai
- Aspro Kai Mavro
- Elefteri
- Pirkagia
- Ohi, Ohi, Ohi
- Apo To Radiofono
- De S’ Agapisa Pote
- Ela (Pale movie)
- Happy Birthday

==== Thanos Kalliris - Kapoio Kalokeri ====
- Kapoio Kalokeri
- Alimono
- Ela Fegari Mou
- Kerdisame

==== Giorgos Mazonakis – Me Ta Matia Na To Les ====
- Tipota
- Teleftea Fora

==== Polina– Kenourgios Erotas ====
- Gia Mena Ego
- Kenourgios Erotas

==== Efi Sarri - Petao ====
- Petao
- Apotoma

==== Lefteris Pantazis - O Paihtis ====
- Pes Pos M' Agapas

==== Stathis Aggelopoulos - Kripse Me Stin Agkalia Sou ====
- Kripse Me

==== Petros Kolettis - Tora Einai I Seira Mou ====
- Tora Einai I Seira Mou
- Akoma Ponao
- Ase Me Isiho
- Ola Afta Einai I Zoi
- Kamia Fora

=== 1995 ===
==== Sofia Arvaniti - I Agapi Ta Panta Nikai ====
- Esto Mia Nihta

==== Spiros Spirakos - Kai Na’ Kseres ====
- Ah Kai Na’ Kseres
- Afta Pou Ikseres Na Ta Ksehaseis

==== Nikos Karvelas - 25 Ores ====
- Ragise O Kathreftis

==== Polina - "Deka Hronia Meta" ====
- I gyneka tis zois sou

=== 1996 ===
==== Labis Livieratos - Bam Kai Kato ====
- Bam Kai Kato
- Psemata
- Na Tou Pis
- Koita Na Apofasisis
- Ola Edo Plironode
- Osa Xiliometra

==== Thanos Kalliris - Monaxa Tin Psixi Sou ====
- Ksilina Spathia
- Fovame Tis Defteres
- Monaxa Tin Psihi Sou
- I Aniksi De Meni Pia Edo

==== Despina Vandi - Esena Perimeno ====
- Esena Perimeno
- Oi Adres Theloun Pedema

==== Sakis Rouvas - Tora Arhizoun Ta Diskola ====
- Tora Arhizoun Ta Diskola
- Mi M’ Agapisis
- Pos Ta Kataferes
- Kapote Tha’ Maste Mazi
- Diaforetikos
- Eimai Hamenos
- Dos Mou

==== Anna Vissi - Klima Tropiko ====
- Sentonia
- Dixasmeno Kormi

=== 1997 ===
==== Giorgos Alkaios - En Psixro ====
- Ta Dika Mou Tragoudia
- Perasmena Nai, Ksexasmena Oxi
- Kalitera Monos Mou

==== Sabrina - Epikindino Pehnidi ====
- Ena Ena
- Epikindino Pehnidi
- Tora Einai Arga
- Den Exoume Tipota
- Alli Mia Porta Ekleise

==== Thanos Kalliris - Fonakse Me ====
- Adexo
- Fonakse Me An Me Hriastis
- Ponao
- Na Mino I Na Figo
- Eftixos
- Filos + Erastis

==== Despina Vandi - Deka Entoles ====
- Metaniono

==== Lefteris Pantazis - Erhete ====
- Anesthitiko

==== Antypas - Kategida ====
- Orkizomai

==== Katerina Stanisi - Imoun, Eimai Kai Tha Eimai ====
- Apo Pou Ki Os Pou

==== Anna Vissi - Travma ====
- Siga!
- Na’ Sai Kala
- Apolito Keno

==== Nikos Karvelas - O Pio Eftihismenos Anthropos Pano Sti Gi ====
- Magkia Sou

=== 1998 ===
==== Dimitris Kokotas - Gia Mena ====
- Apogoiteftika

==== Triantafillos – Grammata Kai Afierosis ====
- Ponese Me

==== Valantis - Sto Ansaser ====
- Den To Pistevo
- Pou Pas;
- Ti Allo Thes?

==== Angie Samiou - Apousies ====
- Mia Sou Kai Mia Mou
- Ki Ego Edo

==== Petros Imvrios - Allimono ====
- Den Th’ Allaksis
- Allimono Se Mena
- Prosexe
- Tha To Metaniosis
- Sigxorese Me
- Thessaloniki
- Efxaristos
- Tremo Stin Idea
- Mi Me Lipase

==== Katerina Topazi - Maheria ====
- Ena Lepto
- Dexome
- Xilies Fores
- Paradinome

==== Anna Meliti - Anna Meliti ====
- Nai
- Fyge
- Lathos
- Ilie Mou

==== Labis Livieratos - Roda Einai ====
- Ipotithetai

==== Labis Livieratos - Poios Einai Autos ====
- An Den Se Do

==== Victoria Halkiti - Einai Fores ====
- Tha Sou Figo
- Pada
- To Kalokairi Mou
- Afou De M’ Agapas

==== Thanos Kalliris - Ena Xamogelo Gia Ton Adrea ====
- Ena Xamogelo Gia Ton Adrea

==== Thanos Kalliris - Agapi Ora Miden ====
- Mia Signomi
- Agapi Ora Miden
- Monaksia Mou
- Gia Sou Kai Na M’ Agapas
- Ena Xamogelo Gia Ton Adrea

==== Natasa Theodoridou - Defteri Agapi ====
- Peripou
- Nixta Se Gnorisa
- Kane Kati

==== Antonis Remos - Keros Na Pame Parakato ====
- Pame Parakato
- Dropi Sou
- Aftos
- Ma De Mporeis

==== Sakis Rouvas - Kati Apo Mena ====
- Ta Aspra Triadafilla
- Arketa

==== Anna Vissi - Antidoto ====
- Na Ton Agapas

==== Nikos Karvelas – Ena Hrono To Perissotero ====
- Monachoulis

=== 1999 ===
==== Evridiki - To Koumpi ====
- Erotevmenoi Echthroi

==== Labis Livieratos - To Kalitero Paidi ====
- Oute Kalimera
- Horizo
- Ipotithete

==== Elli Kokkinou - Epikindina Pehnidia ====
- Anagazomai

==== Antonis Remos – Pali Apo Tin Arxi ====
- Mi Zitas Signomi (Taj mahal)
- Mono Mi Mou Pis Pos M’ Agapas

=== 2000 ===
==== Mando - Se Alli Diastasi ====
- Pio Poli
- Fovame

==== Giorgos Alkaios - Pro Ton Pilon ====
- To Tilefono Mou
- Mi
- La Bamba

==== Ekeinos Kai Ekeinos - Ena Rodo Kai Ena Agathi ====
- San To Teleutaio Tsigaro

==== Harry Varthakouris - Adespotes Oi Nixtes ====
- To Tragoudi Tou Xari III (Tipota)

==== Labis Livieratos - Labis Moro Mou ====
- Opou Ki An Pas
- Alitissa Vroxi

==== Thanos Kalliris - Eimai Kala ====
- Egoismos

==== Elli Kokkinou - Andriki Kolonia ====
- Andriki Kolonia
- Ki Oso Gia Mena
- De Tha Xaseis
- Gia Mia Fora

==== Litsa Giagousi - Kai Sto Eksis ====
- Vrexi
- Asto, Min Orkizese
- Ase Me
- Eimai Edo

==== Natasa Theodoridou - Tha Miliso Me T'Asteria ====
- An Iparxi Paradeisos
- Ego Na Ipoxoro

==== Anna Vissi - Kravgi ====
- Kalitera I Dio Mas
- Kopike I Grammi

==== Anna Vissi - Everything I Am ====
- Moro Mou (No Tomorrow) (vocals by Natalia)

=== 2001 ===
==== Triantafillos - Afiste Minima ====
- Enas Katharos Egoismos

==== Katy Garbi - Apla Ta Pragmata ====
- Esi Tha Hasis
- Pes To (Ksana) Me Ena Fili
- Auto Pou Zisame

==== IRO - Apogiosi ====
- Kamia Fora

==== Antique - Me Logia Ellinika ====
- Kainouria Agapi

==== Labis Livieratos - Ela ====
- Ego Ki Ego
- Opou Ki An Pas
- Pirasmos (nessuno mi puo' giudicare)
- Alitissa Vroxi

==== Thanos Kalliris - Eonia ====
- Aftos O Himonas

==== Despina Vandi - Gia ====
- Thelo Na Se Do
- Ela
- Eime Ego

==== Natasa Theodoridou - Ip'Efthini Mou ====
- Tora To Thimithikes

==== Christina Anagnostopoulou - Ke Hamogelao ====
- Ke Hamogelao
- Enohes
- Proto Fili
- Tilefonima

=== 2002 ===
==== Dimitris Raptis - To Fili Tis Zois ====
- To Fili Tis Zois

==== Giannis Vardis - Pes Mou Ti Niotheis ====
- Fteo

==== Petros Imvrios - Petros Imvrios ====
- To Paradehomai
- Ena Oneiro Telioni
- Poio Fegari
- Akoma Kai Esi
- Alli Mia Nixta
- Ki Etsi Opos Feugis
- Agapao Kai Ponao

==== Antique - Alli Mia Fora ====
- De M’ Agapas

==== Marianta Pieridi - I Gineka Tis Zois Sou ====
- S’ Agapo
- Anapodo Fegari
- I Gineka Tis Zois Sou
- Giro Mou...
- Blue Jean

==== Peggy Zina - Vres Enan Tropo ====
- Tolmas Kai Eheis Parapono, Esi?

==== Sakis Rouvas - Ola Kala ====
- Pou Tha Pas
- Tha Erthi I Stigmi

==== Notis Sfakianakis - As Milisoun Ta Tragoudia ====
- Gia Sena Fovame

==== Anna Vissi - X ====
- Martirio

=== 2003 ===
==== 2 Lips - 2 ====
- Min Antistekese

==== Grigoris Petrakos - Ola Arxizoun ====
- Fotografies

==== Filoi Gia Pada - Tainia Fadasias ====
- Eksi Feggaria
- Tha To Dis

==== Nino - Nino ====
- Horis Na Se Ksero

==== Petros Imvrios - Mou Leipeis Toso ====
- De Sou Aksize Agapi
- Ksena Heria

==== Marianta Pieridi - Oute Ki Esi ====
- Oute Ki Esi

==== Marianta Pieridi - Vale Fantasia ====
- Oute Ki Esi
- Katallili Stigmi

==== Elli Kokkinou - Sto Kokkino ====
- Eimai Kala
- Thelo Tosa Na Sou Po

==== Giorgos Tsalikis - Ekana Ti Nixta Mera ====
- Kapos Etsi

==== Litsa Giagousi - Akou ====
- Ase Me Isixi
- Apothimeno
- Pes Mou
- Teliomeni Mou Agapi

==== Katy Garbi - Emmones Idees ====
- Antres

==== Dimitris Raptis - To Fili Tis Zois ====
- To Fili Tis Zois
- Agapi Mou
- Ti Amo

==== Peggy Zina - Mazi Sou ====
- Den Aksizis

==== Anna Vissi - Paraksenes Ikones ====
- Ego Moro Mou
- Ksafnika

=== 2004 ===
==== Aspa Tsina - Gialina Oneira ====
- Ego Agapi Mou
- Agapi Enoxi
- Ola Gia Xari Sou

==== Marina Solonos - Marina Solonos ====
- S'Agapo-Se Miso
- Alli Mia Eukairia

==== Aggeliki Iliadi - Ena Xrono Mazi ====
- Ena Hrono Mazi

==== Giorgos Aksas - Methismenes Thalasses ====
- Apolito Keno

==== Christos Kostaras- Christos Kostaras ====
- Ginaika Esi Tis Zois Mou

==== Eleana Papaioannou- Koitakse Me ====
- Kalinixta

==== Nino - Ilikrinis ====
- Gia Mena Tha Ziso

==== Petros Imvrios - Kathe Avrio ====
- Tha Se Thimame
- Kathe Avrio Pou Pernai
- Ise Kalokairi

==== Giorgos Giannias - 5 Lepta ====
- Agapise Me

==== Chrispa- Hryspa ====
- Afou De M’ Agapas

==== Chostadinos Christoforou- Idiotiki Parastasi ====
- Den Prepi Na Se Do
- Prepi Na Se Do

==== Giorgos Tsalikis - O Telios Adras ====
- O Telios Adras
- O Prigipas
- Dinamitis
- Sto Palio Amartima
- Ipokatastato
- Poios Ine Autos?
- Sou Xrostao Polla
- Fili Klemmeno

==== Despina Vandi - Stin Avli Tou Paradisou ====
- To Proto Mas Fili
- Kantoo An M’ Agapas

==== Christos Dantis - Maya Maya ====
- Amore
- Monos De Thelo

=== 2005 ===
==== Periklis - Periplaniseis ====
- Apolito Keno

==== Aggeliki Iliadi - Tora Ti Thes? ====
- Nai S'Agapo

==== Valantis - Krata Me ====
- Aggele Mou Kai Aliti

==== Maro Lytra - Mikres Amarties ====
- Ma Den Mporo Na Se Ksexaso (Dakhilak Oud)
- Mi Me Koitas (Give me a sign)

==== Andreas Stamos - Nixtes Paraksenes... ====
- Enas Kainourgios Erotas
- Ola Kapote Telionoun

==== Christos Kostaras- Logo Timis ====
- Ginaika Esi Tis Zois Mou (Plus II Mix)

==== Kelly Kelekidou- Kelly Kelekidou ====
- Lathos Antras

==== Chrispa- Hryspa 100% ====
- Afou De M’ Agapas

==== Chostadinos Christoforou- O Giros Tou Kosmou ====
- Otan Den Iparxi Agapi

==== Elli Kokkinou - SEX ====
- Gia Sou
- Erotevmeni Poli

==== Elena Paparizou - Protereotita: Euro Edition ====
- My Number One (winner song of the Eurovision Song Contest 2005)

==== Giorgos Tsalikis - Pyretos ====
- Alisida
- Edo Tha Mino
- Lipis

==== Christos Dantis - Kata Vathos ====
- Prodosia
- Eklipsi Selinis
- Agapise Me
- Thelo Na Se Vlepo

=== 2006 ===
==== Sarbel - Sahara ====
- San Kai Mena...Pouthena (Like Me...Nowhere)

==== Christos Kostaras- Kammeno Arnitiko ====
- Kapoios Allos
- Otan O Adras De Mila
- Dikopo Maxairi
- Mi Me Lipithis
- Ginaika Esi Tis Zois Mou (Plus II Mix)

==== Petros Imvrios - S’Efxaristo ====
- Tora Tha Kles
- Horis Esena

==== Giorgos Christou - Gia Na Doume ====
- Kai Se Fadazome
- Kollisa
- Mou’ Xeis Teleiosi
- Gia Na Doume
- Apo Sena Eksartate
- Mia Signomi
- Sigxaritiria
- Min Kles Moro Mou

==== Elena Paparizou - Iparhi Logos ====
- Panta Se Perimena (Idaniko Fili)

==== Giorgos Tsalikis - Agapi Axaristi ====
- Agapi Axaristi

==== Mihalis Hatzigiannis - Filoi Ki Ehthri ====
- Esi

=== 2007 ===
==== Gogo Mastrokosta - Amartia ====
- Pos Tha Mporeso

==== Nadia Mitroudi - Afisa Stin Porta Ta Kleidia ====
- Oxi Esi, Ego

==== Giorgos Lianos - Sti Mesi ====
- O,ti Kai An Isoun

==== Thanos Tzanis - Einai Agapi ====
- Einai Agapi
- Tha Metaniosis
- H Ginaika Tis Zois Sou
- Se Paradexome
- Paradinome
- Kanenas Adras
- Monaxa Mia Agapi
- Ftanei Na M'Agapas
- Mi Me Lipase
- Asto
- Tha Figo
- Tis Monaksias To Vlemma

==== Thanos Petrelis - Eimai Akomi Eleftheros ====
- Etsi Ime

==== Kostadinos Gavelas - Mia Fora ====
- Mia Fora
- Palionoume

==== Giorgos Tsalikis - Enoxa Vradia ====
- An M’ Agapas

==== Christos Dantis - No Madonna - Bleeding ====
- No Madonna

=== 2010 ===
==== Sakis Rouvas - Parafora ====
- "Proti Nihta"

==== Harry Varthakouris - Arhodas you Kosmou ====
- "Esto (To tragoudi tou Harry no5)"

=== 2013 ===
==== Konstantinos Argyros - Paidi Gennaio ====
- "Pote Ksana"

=== 2014 ===
==== Konstantinos Argyros - Defteri Fora ====
- "Emeis De Tha Horisoume Pote"
