= Mia foni =

Studio album by Annet Artani
- Released: 6 April 2006
- Genre: Pop
- Length: 1:07:34
- Language: Greek, English
- Label: Virus

Singles from Mia foni
- 1. "Goodbye Amor" Released: Summer 2005; 2. "Why Angels Cry" Released: Early 2006

Mia foni is the debut album by Greek American singer Annet Artani. Released in early April 2006, it features 19 tracks in both Greek and English, including "Why Angels Cry", the song that Artani performed in the Eurovision Song Contest 2006 in Athens, representing Cyprus. The album was released in both Greece and Cyprus, where it entered the top ten.

== Track listing ==
Mia foni track listing
No.	Title	Lyrics	Music	Length
1.	"Intro" (The Early Years)
2.	"Why Angels Cry"	Peter Yiannakis	Peter Yiannakis
3.	"Ola ta thavmata"	Nick Nickolaou	Annet Artani, Decanzo Smith
4.	"Goodbye Amor"	Pigasos	Pigasos
5.	"Sta dino ola"	Artani, Spiros Kasimis	Artani, Frank Vinci, Jimmy Santis
6.	"Pote xana"	Giorgos Mitsigas	Kostas Haritodiplomenos
7.	"Kainourgia agapi xekina"	Pigasos	Pigasos
8.	"Opou kai na'sai"	Pigasos	Pigasos
9.	"Love Changes"	Niv Davidovich	Artani
10.	"Stay (Meine)"	Artani	John Papadopoulos
11.	"To'ha oneireftei"	Matina Stilianoudis	Kostas Haritodiplomenos
12.	"Apple Juice"	Artani, Frank Vinci, Jimmy Santis	Artani, Frank Vinci, Jimmy Santis
13.	"Allou ego, allou esi"	Artani, Giorgos Mitsigas	Kostas Haritodiplomenos
14.	"Ti paraxeni agapi"	Tassos Vougiatzis	Solon Apostolakis
15.	"S'agapo"	Sota Tsotou	Kostas Hatzis
16.	"Outro" (The Early Years)
17.	"Gia sena zo"	Dimitris Korgialas	Dimitris Korgialas
18.	"Ta'ha oneireftei" (Radio edit)	Matina Stilianoudis	Kostas Haritodiplomenos
19.	"Stay (Meine)" (Radio edit)	Artani	John Papadopoulos

== Release history ==
Region	Date	Label	Format
Cyprus	6 April 2006	Virus	CD
Greece	23 April 2006	Virus	CD

== Charts ==
Chart (2006)	Peak position
Cyprus Albums Chart	2
Greece Albums Chart	8
