= DJ (Marianta Pieridi song) =

Single by Marianta Pieridi

from the album DJ - The Hits Collection
- Released: (Greece) October 2006
- Recorded: 2006
- Genre: Pop, modern laika, dance
- Label: Universal Music/Polydor

Marianta Pieridi singles chronology
"Oute Ki Esi" (2003)	"DJ" (2006)	"Tha Doso Resta" (2008)

"DJ" is a CD single by popular Greek artist Marianta Pieridi released in Greece in October 2006 by Universal Music Greece.

== Track listing ==
1. "DJ (Stanna Eller Go)"
2. "Mono An Isoun Trelos (Anlayamatin)"
3. "Parte Ton"
4. "DJ (Bobeatz Mix)"
