= Nomads season 1 =

Nomads
- Season 1
- Presented by: Grigoris Arnaoutoglou
- No. of castaways: 22
- Winner: Apostolia Zoi
- Location: Palawan, Philippines
- No. of episodes: 61

Release
- Original release: October 2 – December 22, 2017

Season chronology
- Next → Season 2

The first season of the Greek version of the Nomads aired from October 2, 2017 until December 22, 2017 on ANT1. It took place in Palawan, Philippines, for 12 weeks. The winner received €150,000. It featured 21 players divided into three nomad tribes: Fire, Oceans, Jungle. Apostolia Zoi was the winner of this season.

== Teams ==
1) Nomads of Fire, Symbol: Kunalada, Color: Red. Showbusiness people.
2) Nomads of Oceans, Symbol: Bakunawa, Color: Blue. Athletes.
3) Nomads of Jungle, Symbol: Tamaraw, Color: Green. Everyday people.

== Rules ==
The rules of the game for every week:

- Week starts with the Territory game. The winning tribe will live in a villa for this week, the runner-up tribe will live in a local village and the last one will live on a beach.

Every week tribes have a captain who changes at the start of the next one. The player who is eliminated chooses next week's captains.

- Second Day: First Immunity Game. Loser tribe nominates two players for elimination. One by captain and one by the rest of the tribe.
- Third Day: Second Immunity Game. Loser tribe from the first Immunity Game doesn't play here. Loser tribe of this game nominates one player for elimination.
- Fourth Day: Captains' Game. Winner takes reward for the tribe.
- Fifth and Final Day: Duel. At first, one player is saved from public vote. Then, the two remaining players duel in a series of matches with the loser being eliminated from Nomads.

From week 4 (instead of week 6 as it was planned), with only two tribes existing (Fire and Oceans in this season) the rules changed a bit:

- Second Day: First Immunity Game. Loser tribe nominates one player for Duel.
- Third Day: Second Immunity Game. This immunity is individual. The rest of the players go to public vote. The player with the fewest votes goes to Duel.

From week 9, tribes no longer exist and players merge.

- First Day: Territory Game. Winner takes one person with him in villa. The rest of the players stay on the beach.
- Second Day: First Immunity Game. Individual Immunity. Loser player is nominated. One extra player is nominated by vote.
- Third Day: Second Immunity Game. Same as the first Immunity Game.
- For Duel, from the four nominated players, by public vote, two players are nominated to Duel.

For the last weeks, the following rules take place.

- No Territory Games. All players live at the beach.
- After all players agreeing, 50,000 € from the final prize can be won by players at different games.
- Immunity Game: Two losers are nominated. One extra player is nominated by vote.
- Duel: From the three nominated players, by public vote, two players are nominated to Duel.

== Contestants ==
List of Nomads 2017 contestants
Contestant	Original tribe	Switched tribe	Merged tribe	Finish
Evi Ioannidou, Model	Jungle			1st Elimination; Episode 5
Fotis Filippopoulos, Research & Innovation Consultant	Jungle			2nd Elimination; Episode 10
Panagiotis Vasilakos, Real Estate Agent	Jungle			Walked; Episode 15
Nicolas Papadopoulos, Gym Owner, Former Decathlete	Oceans	Oceans		Walked due to injury Episode 20
Evangelia Platanioti, Synchronised swimmer	Oceans	Oceans		3rd Elimination; Episode 20
Natasa Kalogridi, Actress	Jungle	Fire		4th Elimination; Episode 25
Irene Zahou, P.E. Teacher	Jungle	Oceans		Walked due to injury Episode 29
Olga-Afroditi Pilaki, Rhythmic Gymnast	Oceans	Oceans		Walked; Episode 31
Manto Gasteratou, Presenter	Fire	Fire		Walked due to injury Episode 36
Manos Pintzis, Actor	Fire	Oceans		Walked; Episode 40
Lefteris Hadjiioannou, Personal Trainer		Fire	Merge	Walked due to injury Episode 42
Christina Koletsa, Singer	Fire	Fire	Merge	Walked; Episode 44
Mike Zambidis, World Champion Kick Boxer	Oceans	Oceans	Merge	5th Elimination; Episode 45
Lefteris Paraskevas, Hairdresser	Jungle	Oceans	Merge	6th Elimination; Episode 50
Dimitris Alexandrou, Model	Fire	Fire	Merge	7th Elimination; Episode 52; Won 10,000 €
Dimitra Frantzi, Athletic Coach	Oceans	Oceans	Merge	8th Elimination; Episode 55
Vasiliki Millousi, Artistic Gymnast	Oceans	Oceans	Merge	9th Elimination; Episode 56; Won 7,500 €
George Katsinopoulos, European Champion Brazilian jiu-jitsu - MMA	Oceans	Oceans	Merge	10th Elimination; Episode 57
Nick Anadiotis, Actor	Fire	Fire	Merge	11th Elimination; Episode 60
George Mavridis, Presenter	Fire	Fire	Merge	3rd Place; Episode 61; Won 25,000 €
Konstantinos Oroklos, Bar Owner	Jungle	Fire	Merge	2nd Place; Episode 61; Won 7,500 €
Apostolia Zoi, Singer	Fire	Fire	Merge	Winner; Episode 61; Won 100,000 €

== Season summary ==
The 21 players were initially divided into three nomad tribes: Fire, Oceans and Jungle.

Challenge winners and eliminations by week
Original air date	Challenge winner(s)			Eliminated	Finish
Original air date	Territory	Immunity	Reward	Eliminated	Finish
October 2, 2017 - October 6, 2017	Fire	Oceans	Fire	Evi	1st Elimination; Episode 5
October 9, 2017 - October 13, 2017	Jungle	Fire	Jungle	Fotis	2nd Elimination; Episode 10
October 16, 2017 - October 20, 2017	Fire	Oceans	Fire	Panagiotis	Walked; Episode 15
October 23, 2017 - October 27, 2017	Oceans	Fire	Fire	Nicolas & Evangelia	Walked / 3rd Elimination; Episode 20
October 29, 2017 - November 2, 2017	Fire	Oceans	Oceans	Natasa	4th Elimination; Episode 25
November 5, 2017 - November 9, 2017	Fire	Fire	Oceans	Irene & Olga	Walked; Episode 29 / Episode 31
November 12, 2017 - November 16, 2017	Oceans	Fire	Fire	Manto	Walked; Episode 36
November 19, 2017 - November 23, 2017	Fire	Fire	Fire	Manos	Walked; Episode 40
November 26, 2017 - November 30, 2017	Dimitris	Apostolia & Mavridis	Nick	Christina & Mike	Walked; Episode 44/ 5th Elimination; Episode 45
December 3, 2017 - December 7, 2017	Dimitra	Apostolia & Dimitra	Paraskevas	Paraskevas	6th Elimination; Episode 50

Challenge winners and eliminations for the last two weeks
Original air date	Challenge winner(s)					
Original air date	Reward	Immunity	Elimination	Reward	Immunity	Elimination
December 10, 2017 - December 14, 2017	Dimitris	Apostolia	Dimitris	Mavridis	Vasiliki	Dimitra
Original air date	Reward	Immunity	Elimination	Immunity	Reward	Elimination
December 17, 2017 - December 18, 2017	Vasiliki	Apostolia	Vasiliki	Nick	Konstantinos	Katsinopoulos
Original air date	Reward	Reward	Elimination	3rd Place	2nd Place	Winner
December 19, 2017 - December 22, 2017	Konstantinos	Mavridis	Nick	Mavridis	Konstantinos	Apostolia

== Games ==
- Note: In Score, first number is for Fire, second is for Oceans and the third is for Jungle. In Duel, the score is between two individual players.
- From Episode 16, Fire and Oceans only exist.
- Merge happened in Episode 41.
- Episode 46, it was the last Territory Game.

Episode	Game	Score	Info
1	Territory	2-2-0	1st place: Fire, 2nd place: Oceans, 3rd place: Jungle
2	Immunity	1-1-0	Jungle lost, Fotis and Evi were nominated
3	Immunity	0-2-0	Fire lost, Mavridis was nominated
4	Captains	1-0-0	Dimitris won with the best time.
5	Duel	2-1	Mavridis was saved by public vote. Fotis won. Evi was eliminated.: Fotis won the first match because Evi passed out and was unable to continue.
6	Territory	0-0-1	1st place: Jungle, 2nd place: Oceans, 3rd place: Fire
7	Immunity	1-2-0	Jungle lost, Fotis and Natasa were nominated
8	Immunity	3-1-0	Oceans lost, Evangelia was nominated
9	Captains	0-0-4	For Oceans, Evangelia played. First Round: Mavridis was eliminated. Second Round: With 3 wins Konstantinos was the winner.
10	Duel	1-2	Evangelia was saved by public vote. Natasa won. Fotis was eliminated.
11	Territory	1-0-1	1st place: Fire, 2nd place: Jungle, 3rd place: Oceans
12	Immunity	10-10-8	Jungle lost, Panagiotis and Natasa were nominated
13	Immunity	2-3-0	Fire lost, Manto was nominated
14	Captains	1-0-1	First Round:Irene was eliminated. Second Round: With Score 2-0, Apostolia won.
15	Duel	—N/a	Manto was saved by public vote. Panagiotis walked.: Panagiotis decided to walk so Natasa was saved.
16	Territory	1-3	1st place:Oceans, 2nd place:Fire: Oceans chose Irene & Paraskevas, Fire chose Konstantinos & Natasa. Former Jungle players have one week immunity.
17	Immunity	3-2	Oceans lost, Evangelia was nominated.: Irene and Paraskevas could not be voted or vote someone, because they had immunity for the week.
18	Immunity	—N/a	Dimitra won.
19	Captains	3-0	Fire won.
20	Duel	0-2	Evangelia vs Olga. Olga was nominated by public vote. Olga won. Evangelia was eliminated.
21	Territory	5-3	1st place: Fire, 2nd place: Oceans.
22	Immunity	0-3	Fire lost. Manto was nominated.
23	Immunity	—N/a	Apostolia won.
24	Captains	2-3	Oceans won.
25	Duel	2-1	Manto vs Natasa. Natasa was nominated by public vote. Manto won. Natasa was eliminated.
26	Territory	5-4	1st place: Fire, 2nd place: Oceans.
27	Immunity	6-2	Oceans lost, Manos was nominated.
28	Immunity	—N/a	Paraskevas won.
29	Captains	1-3	Oceans won.
30	Duel	0-2	Manos vs Olga. Olga was nominated by public vote. Olga won. Manos was eliminated.
31	Territory	0-5	1st place: Oceans, 2nd place: Fire.
32	Immunity	5-0	Oceans lost, Mike was nominated.
33	Immunity	—N/a	Katsinopoulos won.
34	Captains	5-0	Fire won.
35	Duel	0-2	Mike vs Paraskevas. Paraskevas was nominated by public vote. Mike was eliminated.
36	Territory	5-0	1st place: Fire, 2nd place: Oceans.
37	Immunity	10-3	Oceans lost, Manos was nominated.
38	Immunity	—N/a	Vasiliki won.
39	Captains	10-7	Fire won.
40	Duel	—N/a	Manos vs Paraskevas. Paraskevas was nominated by public vote. Manos decided to walk so Paraskevas was saved.
41	Territory	—N/a	Dimitris won. He chose Konstantinos to take with him in villa.
42	Immunity	—N/a	Apostolia won. Konstantinos was nominated by losing the game. Nick was nominated by players.
43	Immunity	—N/a	Mavridis won. Mike was nominated by losing the game. Dimitris was nominated by players.
44	Reward	—N/a	Nick won. Nick chose Dimitra, Vasiliki, Mike to go to the reward.
45	Duel	2-1	Dimitris vs Mike. Dimitris and Mike were nominated by public vote. Mike was eliminated.
46	Territory	—N/a	Dimitra won. She chose Vasiliki to take with her in villa.
47	Immunity	—N/a	Apostolia won. Vasiliki was nominated by losing the game. Paraskevas was nominated by players.
48	Immunity	—N/a	Dimitra won. Dimitris was nominated by losing the game. Konstantinos was nominated by players.
49	Reward	—N/a	Paraskevas won. He chose Apostolia and Konstantinos to take with him to the reward.
50	Duel	2-1	Dimitris vs Paraskevas. Dimitris and Paraskevas were nominated by public vote. Paraskevas was eliminated.
51	Reward	—N/a	Dimitris won. Dimitris won 10,000 euros.
51	Immunity	—N/a	Apostolia won. Vasiliki and Dimitra were nominated by losing the game. Dimitris was nominated by players.
52	Duel	0-2	Dimitris vs Vasiliki. Dimitris and Vasiliki were nominated by public vote. Dimitris was eliminated.
53	Reward	—N/a	Mavridis won. Mavridis won 10,000 euros. Plus, he chose Katsinopoulos and Nick for the other part of the reward.
54	Immunity	—N/a	Vasiliki won. Mavridis and Dimitra were nominated by losing the game. Apostolia was nominated by players.
55	Duel	2-0	Apostolia vs Dimitra. Apostolia and Dimitra were nominated by public vote. Dimitra was eliminated.
56	Immunity	—N/a	Apostolia won. Konstantinos and Nick were nominated by losing the game. Vasiliki was nominated by players.
56	Reward	—N/a	Reward from Quiz. Vasiliki won 7,500 euros.
56	Duel	3-0	Konstantinos vs Vasiliki. Konstantinos and Vasiliki were nominated by public vote. Vasiliki was eliminated.
57	Immunity	—N/a	Nick won. Konstantinos and Katsinopoulos were nominated by losing the game. Apostolia was nominated by players.
57	Reward	—N/a	Reward from Quiz. Konstantinos won 2,500 euros.
57	Duel	3-0	Konstantinos vs Katsinopoulos. Konstantinos and Katsinopoulos were nominated by public vote. Katsinopoulos was eliminated.
58	Reward	—N/a	Reward from Quiz. Konstantinos won 5000 euros.
59	Reward	—N/a	Mavridis won. Mavridis won 15,000 euros.
60	Semifinal	—N/a	Konstantinos vs Apostolia vs Nick. Mavridis was sent to the final by public vote. Nick was eliminated.
61	Final	—N/a	Mavridis vs Konstantinos vs Apostolia. Winner is Apostolia. 2nd Place: Konstantinos. 3rd Place: Mavridis

== Votes ==
=== Voting history ===
Nomads
	Original Tribes						Switched Tribes										Merged tribe										
Episode #	2	3	7	8	13	13	18	20	22	25	27	30	32	35	38	40	42	43	47	48	51	54	56	57	60	61	61
Nomads	Jungle	Fire	Jungle	Oceans	Jungle	Fire	Oceans		Fire		Oceans		Oceans		Oceans		Merge										
Immunity							Paraskevas & Irene	Dimitra	-	Apostolia	Irene	Paraskevas	-	Katsinopoulos	-	Vasiliki	Apostolia	Mavridis	Apostolia	Dimitra	Apostolia	Vasiliki	Apostolia	Nick			
Nominated by Game																	Konstantinos	Mike	Vasiliki	Dimitris	Vasiliki & Dimitra	Mavridis & Dimitra	Konstantinos & Nick	Konstantinos & Katsinopoulos			
Nominated by Captain/ Public Vote^{1}	Fotis	-	Fotis	-	Panagiotis	-	-	Olga	-	Natasa	-	Olga	-	Paraskevas	-	Paraskevas											
Nominated by Vote	Evi	Mavridis	Natasa	Evangelia	Natasa	Manto	Evangelia	-	Manto	-	Manos	-	Mike	-	Manos	-	Nick	Dimitris	Paraskevas	Konstantinos	Dimitris	Apostolia	Vasiliki	Apostolia			
Nominated Players^{4}	Fotis, Evi & Mavridis		Fotis, Natasa & Evangelia		Panagiotis, Natasa & Manto		Evangelia & Olga		Manto & Natasa		Manos & Olga		Mike & Paraskevas		Manos & Paraskevas		Dimitris & Mike		Dimitris & Paraskevas		Dimitris & Vasiliki	Apostolia & Dimitra	Konstantinos & Vasiliki	Konstantinos & Katsinopoulos			
Votes	2-1-1-1-1	6-1	2-1-1-1	5-1	2-1-1	4-1-1-1	3-2-1-1	-	3-3-1-1	-	5-2	-	3-2-1	-	3-2-1	-	6-4-1	6-5	4-2-1-1-1	4-3-1-1	4-2-1-1	5-1-1	4-1-1	3-2	Match		
Eliminated	Evi Ioannidou		Fotis Filippopoulos		Panagiotis Vasilakos		Evangelia Platanioti		Natasa Kalogridi		Manos Pintzis^{2}		Mike Zambidis^{3}		Manos Pintzis		Mike Zambidis		Lefteris Paraskevas		Dimitris Alexandrou	Dimitra Frantzi	Vasiliki Millousi	George Katsinopoulos	Nick Anadiotis	George Mavridis	Konstantinos Oroklos
Voter	Vote																										
Apostolia		Mavridis				Manto			Christina								Nick	Katsinopoulos	Dimitra	Nick	Katsinopoulos	Katsinopoulos	Katsinopoulos	Mavridis			Winner
Konstantinos	Evi		–		Natasa				Manto								Nick	Katsinopoulos	Mavridis	Nick	Katsinopoulos	Nick	Vasiliki	Mavridis			2nd Place
Mavridis		Christina				Manos			Christina								Christina	Dimitris	Dimitris	Konstantinos	Dimitris	Apostolia	Vasiliki	Apostolia			3rd Place
Nick		Mavridis				Mavridis			Christina								Christina	Dimitris	Paraskevas	Konstantinos	Dimitris	Apostolia	Vasiliki	Apostolia		Eliminated	
Katsinopoulos				Evangelia			Evangelia				Manos		Manos		Manos		Christina	Dimitris	Paraskevas	Konstantinos	Konstantinos	Apostolia	Vasiliki	Apostolia	Eliminated		
Vasiliki				Evangelia			Nicolas				Manos		Mike		Manos		Nick	Dimitris	Paraskevas	Nick	Dimitris	Apostolia	Mavridis	Eliminated			
Dimitra				Evangelia			Nicolas				Manos		Katsinopoulos		Vasiliki		Dimitris	Dimitris	Paraskevas	Konstantinos	Dimitris	Apostolia	Eliminated				
Dimitris		Mavridis				Manto			Manto								Nick	Katsinopoulos	Dimitra	Katsinopoulos	Mavridis	Eliminated					
Paraskevas	–		Natasa		Natasa		–				Manos		Mike		Mike		Nick	Katsinopoulos	Konstantinos	Mavridis	Eliminated						
Mike				Evangelia			Evangelia				Paraskevas		Manos		Manos		Christina	Dimitris	Eliminated								
Christina		Mavridis				Manto			Natasa								Nick	Katsinopoulos	Walked								
Hadjiioannou	Not in the game																Walked due to injury										
Manos		Mavridis				Manto					Paraskevas		Mike		Mike		Walked										
Manto		Mavridis				Nick			Konstantinos						Walked due to injury												
Olga				Evangelia			Evangelia				Manos		Walked														
Irene	Evi		Paraskevas		–		–				–	Walked due to injury															
Natasa	Panagiotis		Panagiotis		Paraskevas				Manto		Eliminated																
Evangelia				Dimitra			Olga		Eliminated																		
Nicolas				–			Vasiliki		Walked due to injury																		
Panagiotis	Natasa		Natasa		Irene		Walked																				
Fotis	Paraskevas		Konstantinos		Eliminated																						
Evi	Konstantinos		Eliminated																								

^1 From week 4, one player is nominated by tribe, one player wins immunity and the rest are being voted by public with the least favorite being the second nominated player for Duel.

^2 Manos was eliminated. But Olga decided to leave. So Manos returned.

^3 Mike was eliminated. But Manto decided to leave because of an injury. So Mike returned.

^4 From week 9, final nominated players, who go to Duel, are chosen by public vote.

== Tribe captains ==
Week #	Captains ^{1}		
1	Dimitris	Mike	Paraskevas
2	Mavridis	Nicolas ^{2}	Konstantinos
3	Apostolia	Vasiliki	Irene
4 ^{3}	Apostolia	Dimitra	—N/a
5	Natasa	Olga	—N/a
6	Mavridis	Katsinopoulos	—N/a
7	Hadjiioannou	Paraskevas	—N/a
8^{4}	Nick	Katsinopoulos	—N/a

^1 First week, every tribe chose their captain. For the following weeks, each tribe's captain was chosen by the eliminated player.

^2 Nicolas Papadopoulos was chosen captain for this week but because of an injury, George Katsinopoulos took this place. At the end of the week, he returned as captain. Evaggelia Platanioti played the Captains Game.

^3 Panagiotis Vasilakos walked. So, he had no right to choose next week's captains. With vote 6-1, Dimitra is Oceans' captain and with vote 5-2, Apostolia is Fire's captain. Furthermore, Jungle Tribe no longer exists and the nomads of this tribe will go to the other tribes.

^4 Last tribe captains.
