= Tha Doso Resta =

Single by Marianta Pieridi
- B-side: "Pia S'Agapaei Pio Poli"
- Released: March 2008
- Recorded: 2007
- Genre: Pop, Modern Laika, Dance
- Length: 3:12
- Label: Virus Music
- Songwriters: Thanos Kapiris, Antonis Pappas, Tomazina

Marianta Pieridi singles chronology
"DJ" (2006)	"Tha Doso Resta" (2008)

"Tha Doso Resta" (Greek: Θα Δώσω Ρέστα; English: I'll Give Change) is a CD single by popular Greek artist Marianta Pieridi released in Greece in March 2008 by Virus Music.

The song was first released in October 2007, and was soon followed by a music video. It was then released as a CD single with two remixes, the music video, and the song "Pia S'Agapaei Pio Poli". The single is Pieridi's first release after signing with Virus Music.

== Track listing ==
1. "Tha Doso Resta" - 3:12
2. "Tha Doso Resta" (Bawar Mix) - 3:59
3. "Tha Doso Resta" (Club Mix) - 3:01
4. "Pia S'Agapaei Pio Poli" - 3:04
5. "Tha Doso Resta" (Music Video)

== Charts ==
"Tha Doso Resta" entered the Greek Top 50 Singles Chart at number four and climbed to number three, its peak position, the next week. The single stayed on the chart for six weeks.

Greek Top 50 Singles
Weeks	6
Highest position	3
