= Goodbye Amor =

Single by Annet Artani

from the album Mia Foni
- Released: (Greece) Summer 2005
- Genre: Pop
- Label: Virus Music

Annet Artani singles chronology
"Goodbye Amor" (2005)	"Why Angels Cry" (2006)

"Goodbye Amor" is the first CD-single by Annet Artani, released in summer 2005. The single includes three versions of "Goodbye Amor".

== Track listing ==
1. "Goodbye Amor" (Album version)
2. "Goodbye Amor" (Instrumental)
3. "Goodbye Amor" (Kostas L.Sub Remix)

== Charts ==
Chart (2005)	Peak position
Greece (IFPI)	7
