= Grigoris Arnaoutoglou =

Greek television host

- Born: 17 December 1973 (age 52); Munich, West Germany
- Other name: (Greek: Γρηγόρης Αρναούτογλου)
- Occupations: TV Host; TV Personality; Radio Producer; Actor
- Years active: 1991 - present
- Children: Anastasios Arnaoutoglou
- Relatives: Sakis Arnaoutoglou

Grigoris Arnaoutoglou (Greek: Γρηγόρης Αρναούτογλου; born December 17, 1973) is a Greek television host, television personality, actor and radio producer. Best known for his work in television, Arnaoutoglou's breakthrough came really early in his television career back on 90's when he was hosting the road talk show One Wonderful World (1992-1998) in a Greek small television network.

He is also known for hosting the morning daytime entertaining show of MEGA Beautiful World in the Morning (2003-2009) or other successful shows or game shows as Much on Sunday & Even More on Sunday (2005-2007), The Rentier (2007-2009), Money Drop (2010-2012), My mum cooks better than yours (2015-2017), Who wants to become a millionaire? (2022-today) and others. In 2013 he entered the late-night television, on ANT1, launching the late-night talk show The Kardashians (2013-2015). From 2015 he hosts the late night talk The 2Night Show with Grigoris Arnaoutoglou on ANT1.

== Early life ==
Arnaoutoglou was born in Munich in Germany on December 17, 1973 as a child of Greek immigrants. On an early age he and his family went back in Greece on their place of origin Megali Panagia, a small village in Chalkidiki. His father, Tasos Arnaoutoglou, was a car mechanic and his mother, Kiki Arnaoutoglou, was a dressmaker. When he started school his family moved to Thessaloniki.

At 14 he started attending a technical school and at the same time started working as an electrician in Thessaloniki. In 1990, while he was still 16 years old, he made his debut on media as a radio producer on Panorama 86 FM with a late-night show after midnight.

== Career ==
=== Television beggings in Thessaloniki (1991-2000) ===
In November 1991, he made his television debut as a host on daytime game show The Great Escape on Makedonia TV while he was still 17. The show run for only one season. In 1992 he created one of the most successful project of his career One Wonderful World with Grigoris Arnaoutoglou on the same television network. The concept was a really simple idea, the host, one microphone and a camera. Arnaoutoglou started walking the streets of Thessaloniki and was talking with people on the streets. The show was running once a week and very soon met a huge success, while the network Makedonia TV wasn't a big one and the ratings were low. Over time Arnaoutoglou started also travelling in other places out of Thessaloniki and also other countries for an episode of his show. On the same time biggest Greek television networks started making shows like One Wonderful World in their own programming.

On the following years Arnaoutoglou continued signing contracts with Makedonia TV. In 1995 he also started hosting the daytime talk show Here Thessaloniki, as a duet with the anchorwoman Rania Thraskia, every afternoon on Makedonia TV. The show run for three seasons until 1998 when Arnaouglou stopped his contract with the network after 7 years.

While he had different suggestions to continue his career in Athens, he decided to sign with the third channel of national television network ERT. In his new television basis he started hosting two different shows the daytime talk show Day Afternoon for two seasons and a weekly travel talk show In a wonderland, a spin-off of One Wonderful World, which run for one season.

In 2000 he decided to stop his career in Thessaloniki in order to chase a bigger career in Athens on the biggest Greek television networks.

=== First steps on ANT1 (2001-2002) ===
In 2001 he signed with ANT1, one of the two biggest television network back in that time, as a co-host of the prank show Plugged In next to Nikos Stergiou and Thanasis Viskadourakis. The show didn't recognise a successful and suddenly cancelled after a few weeks. Moreover Arnaoutoglou made his television acting debut as a guest, portraying himself, on ANT1's comedy One plus one for an episode. After the cancellation of Plugged In Arnaoutoglou created and launched a new spin-off of his classic travel show, One Beautiful World, the Like the snow. The show wasn't also successful and cancelled after few episodes.

In 2002 followed other two unsuccessful tries in his new career, Chilli a talk show with five different co-hosts (Arnaoutoglou was one of them) and another travel show Non-stop. He also took part as a guest on the comedy Girlfriends for ever playing himself.

After this circle of tries his contract with ANT1 concluded and he signed a new contract with MEGA the second high-rated television network in Greece back then.

=== New era in his career, reality shows, morning television and big television hits (2002-2009) ===
In 2002 MEGA decided to launch the Greek version of the successful reality show The Farm and they found in Arnaoutoglou the ideal presenter. Moreover they asked him to create a new version of his 90's big successful show One Beautiful World with a higher budget. The Farm met a big success from the first episode while the new travel talk show Beautiful World concentrated also really high ratings. After the end of the first season of The Farm MEGA decided to renew the show for a second season right after the first while they decided to launch it as a celebrity edition, something really new for Greek television reality. In 2003 after three successful programs Arnaoutoglou signed a really powerful contract with MEGA.

== Filmography ==
=== Television ===
Year	Title	Role	Notes
1991-1992	The great escape	Himself (host)	Daytime game show
1992-1998	One Beautiful World	Himself (host)	Street talk show; also creator
1995-1998	Edo Thessaloniki	Himself (host)	Daytime talk show
1998-1999	In a wonderland	Himself (host)	Travel show; also creator
1998-2000	Mera Mesimeri	Himself (host)	Daytime talk show
2001	Plugged In	Himself (host)	Prank show
2001	One plus one	Himself	1 episode
2001	Like the snow	Himself (host)	Travel talk show; also creator
2002	Chili	Himself (host)	Talk show
2002	Non-stop	Himself (host)	Travel talk show; also creator
2002	Girlfriends for ever	Himself	1 episode
2002-2003	The Farm Greece / Celebrity Farm Greece	Himself (host)	Reality television; season 1-2
2002-2003	Beautiful World	Himself (host)	Travel show; also creator; season 1
2003-2004	Survivor Greece	Himself (host)	Reality television; season 1-2
2003-2009	Beautiful World in the Morning	Himself (host)	Daytime morning talk show; season 1-6
2004	The Nanny	Himself	1 episode
2004	Close your eyes	Himself	1 episode
2005	The Red Suite	Himself	Episode: "Holly Avetif"
2005	In the Nick of Time	Himself	1 episode
2005-2007	Much on Sunday / Even More on Sunday	Himself (host)	Sunday live show on Mega Channel
2007	Ugly Maria	Himself	1 episode
2007	MEGA Telethon - Chain of love for hope	Himself (host)	TV special
2007-2009	The Rentier	Himself (host)	Game live show
2008	Safe Sex TV Stories	Himself	Episode: "Nobody is perfect"
2009	Black Midnight	Himself	1 episode
2010	The pursuit of success	Himself (host)	TV special; also creator
2010-2012	Money Drop	Himself (host)	Game show; season 1-2
2011	DanSing For You	Himself (guest judge)	Live 3; Season 1
2011-2013	Beautiful World ²	Himself (host)	Travel show; also creator; season 2-3
2013-2015	The Kardasians	Himself (host)	Late night talk show on ANT1; also creator
2014	Hair	Himself	3 episodes
2015-2017	My mum cooks better than yours	Himself (host)	Daytime cook game show; season 1-3
2015-today	The 2Night Show with Grigoris Arnaoutoglou	Himself (host)	Late night talk show on ANT1; also creator
2017	My Way	Himself (host)	Travel show; also creator
2017	Nomads	Himself (host)	Reality television; season 1
2018	The Wall	Himself (host)	Sunday game show
2020	Live Tonight with Grigoris Arnaoutoglou	Himself (host)	Late night talk show; also creator
2022	Greece's Got Talent	Himself (judge)	Season 7
2022-today	Who wants to become a millionaire? Greece	Himself (host)	Daytime game show; season 7-11
2024	Sote	Himself	1 episode
2024-today	The Road Show with Grigoris Arnaoutoglou	Himself (host)	Travel show; also creator
2025	ANT1 Telethon - We Are One	Himself (host)	TV special

=== Film ===
Year	Title	Role	Notes	Ref.
2020	Halway 5-0	Himself	cameo appearance	
2020	Ciao Italia	kiosk seller		

=== Music videos ===
Year	Music video	Artist	Notes
2022	Inside the heart	Walkman the Band	
2025	Lola	Marina Satti	

== Books ==
- Makigiarismenoi Fovoi (Greek: Μακιγιαρισμένοι Φόβοι), January 2012, ISBN 978-960-496-633-2
