= DJ: The Hits Collection =

DJ – The Hits Collection

Greatest hits album by Marianta Pieridi
- Released: September 2006
- Genre: Pop, dance, contemporary laika
- Label: Universal Music Greece, Polydor

Marianta Pieridi chronology
Sfera Stin Kardia (2005)	DJ – The Hits Collection (2006)

DJ – The Hits Collection is a compilation album by Greek singer Marianta Pieridi. It was released in Greece in October 2006 by Universal Music Greece, including 3 new songs and a previously unreleased one.

== Track listing ==
1. "DJ (Stanna Eller Go)"
2. "Mono An Isoun Trelos (Anlayamatin)"
3. "Parte Ton"
4. "S'agapo"
5. "Oute Ki Esi"
6. "Vale Fantasia"
7. "Mine Dipla Mou"
8. "Giro Mou"
9. "Aplose Ta Heria Sou"
10. "Heretismata"
11. "Afti I Agapi"
12. "Ena"
13. "Iparhoun Kati Andres"
14. "Abra Katabra"
15. "Viasou"
16. "Ta Pio Megala Onira"
17. "Ginekes / Vale Fantasia (featuring Goin'Through)"
