= Se Thelo Me Trela =

Single by Kelly Kelekidou

from the album Makria Sou Den Iparho
- Released: (Greece) November 2007
- Recorded: 2007
- Genre: Pop, modern laïka, dance
- Label: Sony BMG

"Se Thelo Me Trela" is a CD single by the popular Greek singer Kelly Kelekidou, released in November 2007 by Sony BMG. The golden CD single contains three songs from Kelekidou's third studio album Makria Sou Den Iparho, which was released in April 2008. The song's title, "Se Thelo Me Trela", is a Greek translation of a popular 2006 Arabic hit titled "Ya Tabtab Wa Dallaa" by the Lebanese singer, Nancy Ajram.

== Track listing ==
1. "Se Vgazo Akiro"
2. "Se Thelo Me Trela"
3. "Gia Kapia Kseni"

== Charts ==
Chart	Providers	Peak position	Certification
Greek Singles Chart	IFPI	1	Gold
