= Pio Poli Tin Kiriaki =

Greek entertainment TV show

- Promotional photograph
- Πολύ την Κυριακή
- Starring: Grigoris Arnaoutoglou (2005-2007); Marietta Hroussala (2005-2006); Kalomoira (2006-2007)
- Country of origin: Greece

Production
- Running time: 2 hours

Original release
- Network: Mega Channel
- Release: October 2005 – July 2007

Poly Tin Kyriaki (Much on Sunday), later known as Pio Poli Tin Kiriaki (Even More on Sunday) is a Greek entertainment show on Mega Channel, hosted by showman Grigoris Arnaoutoglou and Marietta Hroussala and later Kalomoira.

In its first season, the show was called Poli Tin Kiriaki (Much on Sunday), a pun on the Greek film 'Pote tin Kyriaki' (Never on Sunday) and featured Marietta Hroussala. But after a successful first season, the show was renamed, with the added "Pio" prefix in the title, making it Pio Poli Tin Kiriaki, with Kalomoira coming in as the co-hostess.

== Format ==
The show featured a lot of audience interaction, as well as prize giveaways. It also visited many parts of Greece, where different events were held. Cars and other things of that nature were often given away.

On each episode there also were three contestants. Those contestants had to answer various questions throughout the show in order to earn points. In the first season, the contestant with the most points was sent to a different part of the world. The next week, they would have to answer questions, with the new winner in order to continue their journey around the world. In season 2, the winner of each episode was given a ticket. This ticket gave them a spot in the final episode competing against all the other winners for the grand prize. The grand prize of season 2 was a trip to space.

== Mascot ==
The show's mascot was a live cow named "Clara". She was featured in every episode, as well as the theme of the show. Over the summer, Clara was sent to a farm where she became pregnant. Since she was pregnant, she was not part of the beginning of season 2. She lives at the Attica Zoological Park.

== See also ==
- Mega Channel
- Grigoris Arnaoutoglou
- Kalomira
