= For the Rest of Your Life =

- Genre: Game show
- Created by: Dick de Rijk
- Presented by: Nicky Campbell
- Theme music composer: Marc Sylvan
- Country of origin: United Kingdom
- Original language: English
- No. of series: 1
- No. of episodes: 40

Production
- Running time: 60 minutes (inc. adverts)
- Production company: Initial

Original release
- Network: ITV
- Release: 8 May 2007 – 28 August 2009

Related
- Set for Life (US version)

For the Rest of Your Life is a British game show that aired on ITV from 2007 and was hosted by Nicky Campbell. In each game, a couple tries to win the prize of a monthly cheque for the rest of their lives, determined by finding the white lights and avoiding red ones.

== Format ==
=== Round One ===
The couple chose one of three envelopes, each containing a cash amount from £100 to £200. They then faced a gameboard consisting of several cylinders, each inserted vertically into a plinth and bearing either a red or a white light on the unseen end. Eleven lights were used for Round One, eight white and three red. The couple chose one cylinder at a time and withdrew it from its plinth to expose its light. Finding a white light moved the couple one step up an eight-step money ladder, which started at their chosen amount and increased by that same value for each successive step. However, finding a red light moved the couple one step down the ladder unless they were already at zero.

The couple had to choose again if they found a red light; finding all three ended the game and forfeited all winnings. If the couple had advanced at least four steps up the ladder, they gained the option to end the round after any white light. Once they either ended the round or found the eighth white light, they advanced to Round Two with their total.

=== Round Two ===
In Round Two, the couple played to determine how long they would receive the total from Round One as a monthly pay cheque, ranging from one month to 40 years ("For the Rest of Your Life"). The board now contained 15 lights altogether, 11 white and four red. Each white light moved the couple one step up an 11-step time ladder: 1/3/6 months, then 1/2/3/5/10/15/25 years, and finally For the Rest of Your Life. As before, each red light moved them one step down the ladder unless they were already at the bottom.

For this round, one member of the couple was sequestered in an isolation pod, where they could see the current status of the game on a set of monitors but could not hear anything that was said. The other member remained onstage and chose the lights. After any white light was found, both members had the option to stop or continue, but neither one was told of the other's decision until the onstage game ended.

=== Result ===
Only after the game had ended did the host reveal the isolated member's choices. If they did decide to stop at any point, the couple received the number of cheques for their position on the ladder at that moment, overriding any subsequent portion of the onstage game. If not, the onstage member's actions determined the final result: stopping and keeping the money, finding all four red lights and losing everything, or finding the last white light and winning the number of cheques corresponding to the final position on the ladder.

The maximum potential winnings total was £768,000, obtainable by choosing a £200 envelope, drawing all eight white lights consecutively in Round One to increase the cheque value to £1,600, then drawing all 11 white lights consecutively in Round Two to reach For the Rest of Your Life without the isolated player choosing to stop the game.

== American version ==
A weekly version entitled Set for Life aired in the United States on the ABC, hosted by Jimmy Kimmel. It ran for seven episodes from 20 July until 31 August 2007.

== International versions ==
Country/region	Local title	Presenter(s)	Channel	Date premiered
(Arab League) Arab world	مدى الحياة	Hisham Abdel Rahman	MBC 1	January 31, 2007
Argentina	Por el resto del tu vida	Julian Weich	Telefe	29 February 2007 - 27 May 2007
Greece	Εισοδηματίας (Isodimatías)	Grigoris Arnaoutoglou	Mega channel	26 December 2007 - 27 December 2008
United States	Set for Life	Jimmy Kimmel	ABC	20 July 2007 - 31 August 2008
Vietnam	Tiếp sức	Hoa Thanh Tùng	VTV3	14 February 2008 - October 2008
