= Nomads season 2 =

Nomads
- Season 2
- Presented by: Savvas Poumbouras; Giorgos Lentzas
- No. of castaways: 28
- Winner: Stelios Hantapakis
- Location: Nosy Be, Madagascar
- No. of episodes: 44

Release
- Original release: October 11 – December 23, 2018

Season chronology
- ← Previous; Season 1

Nomads: Madagascar is the second season of the Greek reality competition television show Nomads which aired from 11 October 2018 until 23 December 2018 on ANT1. It takes place in Nosy Be, Madagascar, for 12 weeks. The winner wins €150,000. It features 20 players divided into two nomad tribes: Crocodiles and Lemurians. After the fourth week, a new tribe of former eight Survivor players entered the game as a team called Invaders. Stelios Hantapakis was the winner of this season.

== Teams ==
1) Crocodiles, Color: Blue
2) Lemurians, Color: Red
3) Invaders, Color: Black (Former Survivor Greece Players)

== Rules ==
The rules of the game for every week:

- Week started with the Territory game. The winning tribe lived on the "Island" for this week. The defeated tribe lived in an unpleasant environment, "Savanna".
- Second Day: Immunity Game. Defeated tribe nominated two players for elimination.
- Third Day: Captain's Game. Captain of the defeated tribe nominated one player for elimination.
- Fourth Day: Duel. At first, one player is saved by winning the duel. Then, the audience chose which player to save by voting live.

In the fourth week, every winning team chose by vote a player to send to the Selected tribe and joined the two captains. At the end of the week, five more players joined the new tribe by public vote.

In the fifth week, a new tribe, the Invaders, entered the game.

List of Nomads 2018 contestants
Contestant	Original tribe	Switched tribe	Switched tribe 2	Merged tribe	Finish
Annita Nathanael, 50, Athens, Businesswoman	Crocodiles				1st Elimination; Episode 4
Traiana Anania, 29, Athens, Actress, Singer	Crocodiles				2nd Elimination; Episode 8
Nikos Chouliaras, 38, Keratsini, Mini Market Owner	Lemurians				Walked due to injury Episode 12
Sissy Zournatzi, 28, Thessaloniki, Instagrammer	Lemurians				3rd Elimination; Episode 12
Tonia Solanaki, 31, Chania, Water Polo Player	Lemurians				4th Elimination; Episode 12
Dimitris Koukourikis, 39, Thessaloniki, Businessman	Crocodiles				5th Elimination; Episode 16
Katia Tsovgan, 29, Argyroupoli, Muay Thai Champion	Crocodiles				6th Elimination; Episode 16
Alex Kavadias, 39, Ilioupoli, Singer	Crocodiles				7th Elimination; Episode 16
Dimitris Gialamas, 28, Langadas, Sport Cafe Owner	Crocodiles				8th Elimination; Episode 16
Dimitris Korgialas, 47, Athens, Singer	Lemurians				9th Elimination; Episode 16
Marianna Kalergi, ^{1} 25, Muay Thai Champion	Invaders	Invaders			10th Elimination; Episode 20
Marios Akrivopoulos, 43, Veria, Farmer, Market Stall Seller	Crocodiles	Selective	Selective		11th Elimination; Episode 24
Dimitra Alexandraki, 28, Rethymno, Model	Crocodiles	Selective	Selective		Walked; Episode 28
Elisavet Dovliatidou, ^{1} 25, Thessaloniki, Model	Invaders	Invaders	Invaders		12th Elimination; Episode 28
Dimitris Marmaras, 35, Paphos, Barber	Lemurians	Selective	Invaders		13th Elimination; Episode 32
Alexandros Sears, 25, Athens, Strength and Conditioning Coach	Crocodiles	Selective	Selective		14th Elimination; Episode 36
Orestis Tsangk, ^{1} 29, Thessaloniki, Entrepreneur	Invaders	Invaders	Invaders		15th Elimination; Episode 36
Nasos Papargyropoulos, ^{1} 32, Athens, Βusinessman, Actor	Invaders	Invaders	Invaders		16th Elimination; Episode 36
Marianna Kamarotaki, 34, Glyfada, Crossfit Trainer	Lemurians	Selective	Selective	Merge	17th Elimination; Episode 40
Giannis Spaliaras, ^{1} 43, Athens, Actor, Model	Invaders	Invaders	Invaders	Merge	18th Elimination; Episode 40
Mike, 25, Athens, Singer	Lemurians	Selective	Selective	Merge	19th Elimination; Quarter-Final; Episode 44
Dimos Charisteas, 35, Serres, Fitness Trainer, Former Footballer	Lemurians	Selective	Selective	Merge	20th Elimination; Quarter-Final; Episode 44
Christos Vasilopoulos, 40, Los Angeles, Actor	Crocodiles	Selective	Selective	Merge	21st Elimination; Quarter-Final; Episode 44
Kostas Anagnostopoulos, ^{1} 34, Athens, Ex-Mercenary	Invaders	Invaders	Invaders	Merge	22nd Elimination; Quarter-Final; Episode 44
Athina Kostopoulou, 22, Thessaloniki, Handball Player	Lemurians	Selective	Selective	Merge	4th Place; Semi-Final; Episode 44
Darya Turovnik, ^{1} 21, Larnaca, Model	Invaders	Invaders	Invaders	Merge	3rd Place; Semi-Final; Episode 44
Grigoris Morgan, 39, Los Angeles, Musician	Lemurians	Selective	Selective	Merge	2nd Place; Episode 44
Stelios Hantampakis, ^{1} 32, Presenter, Model	Invaders	Invaders	Invaders	Merge	Winner; Episode 44

1. Since episode 17

== Season summary ==
The 20 players were initially divided into two nomad tribes: Crocodiles and Lemurians.

Challenge winners and eliminations by week
Original air date	Challenge winner(s)			Eliminated	Finish
Original air date	Territory	Immunity	Captains	Eliminated	Finish
October 11, 2018 - October 14, 2018	Lemurians	Crocodiles	Lemurians	Annita	1st Elimination; Episode 4
October 18, 2018 - October 21, 2018	Crocodiles	Lemurians	Crocodiles	Traiana	2nd Elimination; Episode 8
October 25, 2018 - October 28, 2018	Lemurians	Crocodiles	Crocodiles	Sissy & Tonia	3rd & 4th Elimination; Episode 12
November 1, 2018 - November 4, 2018	Crocodiles	Lemurians	Lemurians	Korgialas, Kavadias; Koukourikis; Katia & Gialamas	5th - 9th Elimination; Episode 16

New Tribes
Original air date	Challenge winner(s)			Eliminated	Finish
Original air date	Territory	Immunity	Captains	Eliminated	Finish
November 8, 2018 - November 11, 2018	Selective	Selective	Selective	Kalergi	10th Elimination; Episode 20
November 15, 2018 - November 18, 2018	Selective	Invaders	Invaders	Marios	11th Elimination; Episode 24
November 22, 2018 - November 25, 2018	Invaders	Selective	Selective	Elisavet	12th Elimination; Episode 28
November 29, 2018 - December 2, 2018	Invaders	Selective	Selective	Dimar	13th Elimination; Episode 32
December 6, 2018 - December 9, 2018	Invaders	Selective	Invaders	Sears, Orestis & Nasos	14th - 16th Elimination; Episode 36

Challenge winners and eliminations for the last two weeks
Original air date	Challenge winner(s)			Eliminated	Finish
Original air date	1st Immunity	2nd Immunity	3rd Immunity	Eliminated	Finish
December 13, 2018 - December 16, 2018	Kostas	Giannis	Athina	Kamarotaki & Giannis	17th - 18th Elimination; Episode 40

Original air date	Challenge winner(s)						
Original air date	1st Immunity	2nd Immunity	3rd Immunity	Public Vote	3rd & 4th Place	2nd Place	Winner
December 19, 2017 - December 22, 2017	Athina	Darya	Stelios	Morgan	Darya & Athina	Morgan	Stelios

== Votes ==
=== Voting history ===
Nomads
	Original Tribes				New Tribes												
Episode #	4	8	12	16	20	24	28	32	36	40			44				
Immunity										Kostas	Giannis	Athina	Athina	Darya	Stelios		
Nominated by Immune										Morgan	Kamarotaki	Darya					
Nominated by Captain	Annita	Tonia	Korgialas	—	Darya	Christos	Nasos	Nasos	—								
Nominated by Vote	Tonia & Dimos	Traiana & Kavadias	Sissy	—	Elisavet & Kalergi	Marios & Athina	Elisavet & Dimar	Dimar & Orestis	—	Stelios	Kostas	Giannis					
Nominated	Annita, Tonia & Dimos	Tonia, Traiana & Kavadias	Tonia, Sissy, Korgialas & Marios	—	Elisavet, Kalergi & Darya	Marios, Athina & Christos	Elisavet, Dimar & Nasos	Dimar, Orestis & Nasos	—	Morgan, Kamarotaki, Darya, Stelios, Kostas & Giannis							
Votes	8-1-1	5–4	9–1	—	6-1	4-3-1-1	7-1	6-1	—	6-4	6-4	6-4					
Eliminated	Annita Nathanael	Traiana Anania	Sissy & Tonia	Kavadias, Korgialas, Koukourikis, Katia & Gialamas	Marianna Kalergi	Marios Akrivopoulos	Elisavet Dovliatidou	Dimitris "Dimar" Marmaras	Sears, Orestis & Nasos	Kamarotaki & Giannis			Mike, Dimos, Christos & Kostas			Darya & Athina	Grigoris Morgan
Voter	Vote																
Stelios	Not in the Game				Elisavet		Elisavet	Dimar		Dimos	Mike	-					Winner
Morgan	Tonia		Sissy			Marios				Stelios	Kostas	Giannis					2nd Place
Darya	Not in the Game				Elisavet		Elisavet	Dimar		Dimos	MIke	-				3rd Place	Eliminated
Athina	Tonia		Sissy			Marios				Stelios	Kostas	Giannis				4th Place	Eliminated
Kostas	Not in the Game				Elisavet		Elisavet	Dimar		Dimos	Mike	-				Eliminated	
Christos		Kavadias				Athina				Stelios	Kostas	Giannis				Eliminated	
Dimos	Tonia		Sissy			Sears				Stelios	Kostas	Giannis				Eliminated	
Mike	Tonia		Sissy			Marios				Stelios	Kostas	Giannis				Eliminated	
Giannis	Not in the Game				Elisavet		Elisavet	Dimar		Dimos	Mike	-	Eliminated				
Kamarotaki	Tonia		Sissy			Athina				Stelios	Kostas	Giannis	Eliminated				
Nasos	Not in the Game				Evacuated		Elisavet	Dimar		Eliminated							
Orestis	Not in the Game				Elisavet		Elisavet	Dimar		Eliminated							
Sears		Traiana				Athina				Eliminated							
Dimar	Tonia		Sissy				Elisavet	Orestis	Eliminated								
Elisavet	Not in the Game				Kalergi		Dimar	Eliminated									
Dimitra		Traiana				Christos		Walked									
Marios		Traiana				Athina	Eliminated										
Kalergi	Not in the Game				Elisavet	Eliminated											
Korgialas	Dimos		Sissy		Eliminated												
Gialamas		Traiana			Eliminated												
Kavadias		Traiana			Eliminated												
Katia		Kavadias			Eliminated												
Koukourikis		Kavadias			Eliminated												
Sissy	Tonia		Kamarotaki	Eliminated													
Tonia	Korgialas		Sissy	Eliminated													
Chouliaras	Tonia		Sissy	Walked due to injury													
Traiana		Kavadias	Eliminated														
Annita		Eliminated															

== Tribe captains ==
Week #	Captains	
1	Mike	Christos
2	Morgan	Sears
3	Dimar	Koukourikis
4	Mike	Marios
New teams
5	Dimos (1st Captain); Christos (2nd Captain)	Nasos (1st Captain); Kostas (2nd Captain)
6	Dimos	Kostas
7	Morgan	Kostas (1st Captain); Stelios (2nd Captain)
8	Morgan	Stelios
9	Kamarotaki	Kostas
