= To Proto Vima =

Studio album by Apostolia Zoi
- Released: June 2003
- Genre: Modern Laika, pop
- Length: 51:05
- Language: Greek
- Label: Minos EMI
- Producer: Evi Droutsa, Marios Psimopoulos, Christodoulos Siganos

Apostolia Zoi chronology
To Proto Vima (2003)	Apo Do Kai Pera (2005)

To Proto Vima (The First Step) is the debut album by Greek singer Apostolia Zoi, released in June 2003 by Minos EMI. The songs "Mi M'Akoubas" and "Skedon Pote" became hits and showcased her talent, while the latter became the theme song for the series of the same name on ERT.

== Track listing ==
1. "Mi M'Akoubas" - 4:10
2. "Se Hreiazomai" - 4:06
3. "Tha Klapso Horis Na To Deis" - 4:11
4. "To Proto Vima" - 3:42
5. "Epitides" - 3:40
6. "Ah Me Thes" - 3:38
7. "I Kardoula Mou" - 3:19
8. "Tora Akouo Na Mou Les" - 4:41
9. "Pistosi Hronou" - 3:54
10. "Mou Teleionei I Bataria" - 4:04
11. "Me Kefalaia Grammata" - 3:50
12. "Ti Perimenoume" - 4:27
13. "Outro" - 1:45
