= Abra Katabra =

2004 studio album by Mariada Pieridi

Abra katabra Άμπρα κατάμπρα

Studio album by Mariada Pieridi
- Released: 16 December 2004
- Recorded: Workshop studio Sofita studio Vox studio Argyriou Recordings studio
- Genre: Pop, Modern laika
- Length: 51:22
- Language: Greek
- Label: Universal Music Greece; Polydor
- Producer: Panos Barlos

Mariada Pieridi chronology
Vale Fantasia (2003)	Abra katabra Άμπρα κατάμπρα (2004)	Sfera Stin Kardia (2005)

Singles from Abra Katabra
- 1. "Abra katabra" Released: 6 December 2004; 2. "Pes mou mia fora" Released: 14 February 2005; 3. "Ta pio megala oneira" Released: 4 April 2005; 4. "Hairetismata" Released: 13 June 2005

Abra katabra (Greek: Άμπρα κατάμπρα; English: Abracadabra) is the third studio album of Greek singer Mariada Pieridi. It was released on 16 December 2004 by Universal Music Greece and later certified gold, selling 20,000 units in Greece. The album was written by several singers, including frequent partners Alexandros Vourazelis, Elias Philippou and Tasos Vougiatzis.

== Track listing ==
No.	Title	Lyrics	Music	Length
1.	"Pes mou mia fora" (Πες μου μια φορά; Tell me once)	Kosmas	Alexandros Vourazelis	4:48
2.	"Ta pio megala oneira" (Τα πιο μεγάλα όνειρα; The biggest dreams)	Elias Philippou	Energee	3:39
3.	"Hairetismata" (Χαιρετίσματα; Greetings)	Tasos Vougiatzis	Marios Psimopoulos	4:30
4.	"Signomi" (Συγνώμη; Sorry)	Kosmas	Dimitris Kontopoulos	3:09
5.	"Ta apagorevmena" (Τα απαγορευμένα; The forbidden)	Panos Falaras	Marita Chatzidimitriou	3:34
6.	"Abra katabra" (Άμπρα κατάμπρα; Abracadabra)	Sofi Pappa	Sofi Pappa	4:17
7.	"Mes sta dio sou matia" (Μες στα δυο σου μάτια; In your two eyes)	Tasos Vougiatzis	Dimitris Kontopoulos	3:40
8.	"Omihli" (Ομίχλη; Fog)	Panos Falaras	Vasilis Kelaidis	4:02
9.	"Ti na sou grapso" (Τι να σου γράψω; What do I write to you)	Kosmas	Alexandros Vourazelis	3:52
10.	"Makria ki agapimenoi" (Μακριά κι αγαπημένοι; Loved from a distance)	Panos Falaras	Marita Chatzidimitriou	3:21
11.	"Filise me" (Φίλησε με; Kiss me)	Tasos Vougiatzis	Marios Psimopoulos	3:41
12.	"Sto antitheto revma" (Στο αντίθετο ρεύμα; On the contrary flow)	Antonis Pappas	Alexandros Vourazelis	3:59
13.	"De se xeperasa" (Δε σε ξεπέρασα; I'm not over you)	Nikos Vaxavanelis	Kostas Miliotakis	4:19
Total length:				51:22

== Singles ==
The following singles were officially released to radio stations, two of them with music videos. The songs "Signomi" and "Mes sta dio sou matia" did not release as singles, but gained radio airplay.

1. "Abra katabra" (Άμπρα κατάμπρα)
2. "Pes mou mia fora" (Πες μου μια φορά;)
3. "Ta pio megala oneira" (Τα πιο μεγάλα όνειρα)
4. "Hairetismata" (Χαιρετίσματα)

== Credits ==
Credits adapted from liner notes.

=== Personnel ===
- Dimitris Antoniou – guitars (3, 11)
- Yiannis Bithikotsis – bouzouki, baglama (4, 9) • cura (1, 4, 9)
- Giorgos Chatzopoulos – guitars (1, 4, 9, 12)
- Akis Diximos – second vocal (1, 2, 5, 9)
- Telis Kafkas – bass (2, 5, 6, 8, 10)
- Spyros Kontakis – guitars (7)
- Dimitris Kontopoulos – orchestration, programming (7)
- Katerina Kyriakou – backing vocals (3, 6, 10, 11, 12)
- Kostas Lainas – programming (2, 5, 6, 8, 10)
- Yiannis Lionakis – orchestration, guitars (2, 5, 6, 8, 10) • lute (6, 10)
- Kostas Miliotakis – orchestration, programming, bass (13)
- Andreas Mouzakis – drums (1, 2, 4, 5, 6, 8, 9, 10, 13)
- Arsenis Nasis – percussion (6, 10)
- Alex Panayi – backing vocals (3, 6, 10, 11, 12)
- Stavros Pazarentzis – clarinet (3)
- Christos Pertsinidis – guitars (13)
- Marios Psimopoulos – orchestration, programming (3, 11)
- Panayiotis Stergiou – bouzouki, baglama (2, 5)
- Thanasis Vasilopoulos – clarinet (6, 10, 13) • ney (6, 10)
- Alexandros Vourazelis – orchestration, programming (1, 4, 9, 12)

=== Production ===
- Takis Argyriou – sound engineer, mix engineer (at Argyriou Recordings studio)
- Panos Barlos – production manager
- Aris Binis – sound engineer (at Vox studio), mix engineer (at Sofita studio and Vox studio)
- Dimitris Chorianopoulos – sound engineer, mix engineer (at Workshop studio)
- Yiannis Ioannidis (Digital Press Hellas) – mastering
- Giorgos Kalfamanolis – photographer
- Panos Kallitsis – hair styling, make up
- Lefteris Neromiliotis – sound engineer (at Workshop studio)
- Dimitris Panayiotakopoulos – artwork

== Charts ==
Abra katabra made its debut at number 11 on the 'Greece Top 50 Singles' charts. After months, it was certified gold according to sales by IFPI.

Chart	Peak position	Certification
Greek Singles Chart (IFPI)	11	Gold
