= Makria Sou Den Iparho =

Studio album by Kelly Kelekidou
- Released: April 10, 2008
- Genre: Pop, Dance, Modern Laika
- Length: 38:12
- Label: Sony BMG Greece/Columbia

Kelly Kelekidou chronology
Sygkentrosou (2006)	Makria Sou Den Iparho (2008)

Singles from Makria Sou Den Iparho
- 1. "Se Thelo Me Trela" Released: November 2007

Makria Sou Den Iparho (Greek: Μακριά Σου Δεν Υπάρχω; English: I Don't Exist Away From You) is the third full-length album released by popular Greek singer, Kelly Kelekidou. It was released in Greece on April 10, 2008 by Sony BMG Greece. The album contains the three songs "Se Vgazo Akiro", "Gia Kapia Kseni", and "Se Thelo Me Trela" from Kelekidou's golden CD single "Se Thelo Me Trela".

== Track listing ==
1. "Kai Lipon..." - 3:19
2. "Kai Ta Halasame" - 3:41
3. "Ti Kouragio Na'ho" - 3:06
4. "Ta Matakia" - 3:16
5. "Se Vgazo Akiro" - 3:41
6. "Gia Kapia Kseni" - 3:13
7. "Me Peirazei" - 3:09
8. "Se Thelo Me Trela" - 3:56
9. "Aponi Kardia" - 4:02
10. "Brosta Sou Tha Me Vriskeis" - 3:21
11. "To Stavro Mou Tha Kano" - 3:33

== Charts ==
Chart	Providers	Peak position	Weeks On Charts	Certification
Greek Albums Chart	IFPI	4	1	-
