= Set for Life =

- Genre: Game show
- Created by: Dick de Rijk
- Directed by: R. Brian DiPirro
- Presented by: Jimmy Kimmel
- Country of origin: United States
- Original language: English
- No. of seasons: 1
- No. of episodes: 7

Production
- Executive producer: Scott St. John
- Production company: Endemol USA

Original release
- Network: ABC
- Release: July 20 – August 31, 2007

Related
- For the Rest of Your Life (UK version)

Set for Life is an American game show hosted by Jimmy Kimmel and is based on the British game show For the Rest of Your Life. It premiered on Friday, July 20, 2007, at 8:00 p.m. Eastern (7:00 p.m. Central) on ABC, and ran until August 31, 2007, in that time slot.

== Game play ==
Before the game starts, an unaired "Qualifying Round" is played to determine the amount of the monthly payments for which the contestant will be playing (the highest value earned was $4,625/month, the maximum possible value in that case was $2,220,000). In an interview, Jimmy Kimmel said that this round contains twelve numbers and involves "open[ing] an envelope" to see how much per month the contestant will be playing to win.

The televised portion of the game determines how many of these monthly payments the contestant will ultimately receive. The number of payments awarded is based on the contestant's final position on the "time ladder." The contestant begins below the bottom of the ladder with zero payments:

Level	Number of Monthly Payments
SET FOR LIFE (40 years)	480
25 years	300
20 years	240
15 years	180
10 years	120
5 years	60
3 years	36
2 years	24
1 year	12
6 months	6
1 month	1

Fifteen "light sticks," four red and 11 white, are concealed inside stands on the show's stage. The contestant chooses one stick at a time and pulls it from its stand to reveal its color. If the stick is white, the contestant moves up one step on the time ladder. If the stick is red, the contestant moves down one step unless they are not on it, in which case their position remains unchanged.

Each time a white stick is drawn, the contestant is given the option of ending the game and leaving with the number of payments they have earned to that point. Drawing a red stick forces the contestant to take another turn; if all four are drawn, the game ends immediately and the contestant forfeits all winnings. If all 11 white sticks are drawn, the game ends and they win the payments corresponding to their final position on the time ladder. In order to reach the top step ("Set for Life"), the contestant must draw all 11 white sticks consecutively, preceded by drawing no more than three red ones.

Additionally, each contestant brings a friend or family member, termed their "guardian angel." This person is placed in an isolation booth for the duration of the game. They are provided video screens which provide full information as to what sticks the contestant has drawn and where the contestant currently stands on the time ladder, but cannot see or hear the discussions onstage. After each white stick is drawn, the angel is given the opportunity to unilaterally end the game by pressing a button.

The activities within the isolation booth are not aired until the game on the stage has ended by the contestant drawing all 11 white sticks, all four red sticks, or choosing to stop. The game is then reviewed round-by-round, and the video of the angel is played, showing whether they chose to stop the game or not. If the angel has stopped, the outcome of the game is reverted and the contestant wins whatever payments they had accumulated to that point.
