= Sygkentrosou =

Studio album by Kelly Kelekidou
- Released: November 2006
- Genres: Pop, Dance, Modern Laika
- Length: 38:32
- Label: Sony BMG Greece/Columbia

Kelly Kelekidou chronology
Kelly Kelekidou (2005)	Sygkentrosou (2006)	Makria Sou Den Iparho (2008)

Sygkentrosou (Concentrate) is the second album released by Greek singer Kelly Kelekidou. It was released in Greece in November 2006 by Sony BMG Greece.

== Track listing ==
1. "Sygkentrosou" (La Azon) - 3:10
2. "Brosta Sou Tha Me Vriskis" - 3:41
3. "Tha'rthi I Ora Sou" - 3:16
4. "De Me Skeftese" - 3:15
5. "Agapi Thelo Mono" - 3:19
6. "Lathos Agapi" - 3:41
7. "An Se Haso Tha Hatho" - 3:32
8. "Me Edeses Me Ta Magia Sou" - 3:18
9. "Gineka Erotevmeni" - 4:05
10. "Mes Stin Trela Mou" - 3:53
11. "Ma To Theo" (Bonus Track) - 3:27
