= Sfera Stin Kardia =

Sfera Stin Kardia Σφαίρα Στην Καρδιά

Studio album by Mariada Pieridi
- Released: 5 December 2005
- Recorded: Vox studio Studio Argyriou recordings Bi-Kay studio Sofita studio
- Genres: Pop, Modern Laika
- Length: 48:04
- Language: Greek
- Label: Universal Greece
- Producers: Alexandros Vourazelis; Kostas Miliotakis; Giannis Kifonidis; Kostas Platakis

Mariada Pieridi chronology
Abra Katabra (2004)	Sfera Stin Kardia; Σφαίρα Στην Καρδιά (2005)	DJ - The Hits Collection (2006)

Sfera Stin Kardia (Greek: Σφαίρα Στην Καρδιά; English: Bullet in the heart) is the fourth studio album of Greek singer Mariada Pieridi. It was released on 5 December 2005 by Universal Music Greece and later received gold certification, selling 20,000 units in Greece.

== Track listing ==
No.	Title	Lyrics	Music	Length
1.	"Den Eimai Ego" (Δεν Είμαι Εγώ; It's Not Me)	Antonis Pappas	Alexandros Vourazelis	4:05
2.	"Afti I Agapi" (Αυτή Η Αγάπη; This Love)	Antonis Pappas	Alexandros Vourazelis	3:59
3.	"S' Eho Anagki" (Σ' Έχω Ανάγκη; I Need You)	Nikos Sarris	Kostas Miliotakis	3:59
4.	"Me Oli Mou Ti Dinami" (Με Όλη Μου Τη Δύναμη; With My All Power)	Vaggelis Vasiliou	Vaggelis Vasiliou	3:48
5.	"Mi To Peis Pouthena" (Μη Το Πεις Πουθενά; Don't Tell Anyone)	Giorgos Deskos-Maralias	Kostas Platakis	3:37
6.	"Psichosi" (Ψύχωση; Psychosis)	Antonis Pappas	Alexandros Vourazelis	4:21
7.	"Sfera Stin Kardia" (Σφαίρα Στην Καρδιά; Bullet in the Heart)	Antonis Pappas	Alexandros Vourazelis	3:50
8.	"To Mono Pou Thelo" (Το Μόνο Που Θέλω; All I Want)	Antonis Pappas	Alexandros Vourazelis	4:09
9.	"Signomi" (Συγνώμη; Sorry)	Nikos Sarris	Kostas Miliotakis	3:58
10.	"Itan Grammeno" (Ήταν Γραμμένο; It Was Written)	Nikos Sarris	Kostas Miliotakis	4:09
11.	"Anexartisia" (Ανεξαρτησία; Independence)	Antonis Pappas	Alexandros Vourazelis	4:08
12.	"Thelo Mia Agapi Dinati" (Θέλω Μια Αγάπη Δυνατή; I Want A Strong Love)	Konstantinos Kiritsis	Vaggelis Vasiliou	4:08
Total length:				48:04

== Singles ==
The following single was officially released to radio stations and made into music videos. The songs "Den Eimai Ego", "S' Eho Anagki" and "Sfera Stin Kardia", despite not having been released as singles, managed to gain radio airplay with the following single.

"Afti I Agapi"

"Afti I Agapi" was the first single from the album and released in November 2005 with music video, directed by Giorgos Gkavalos. The song is a laiko-pop uptempo track and had massive airplay.

== Credits ==
=== Personnel ===
- Vasilis Armenis – keyboards (tracks: 5)
- Giannis Bithikotsis – bouzouki (tracks: 2, 3, 4, 8, 9, 10, 11) / cura, baglama (tracks: 4, 8, 10, 11)
- Giorgos Chatzopoulos – guitars (tracks: 1, 2, 6, 7, 8, 11)
- Vasilis Diamantis – saxophone (tracks: 12)
- Akis Diximos – second vocal (tracks: 3)
- Stavros Douskas – guitars (tracks: 4)
- Telis Kafkas – bass (tracks: 3, 4, 9, 10)
- Giorgos Kaloudis – guitars (tracks: 12)
- Giannis Kifonidis – orchestration (tracks: 4, 12)
- Katerina Kiriakou – backing vocals (tracks: 1, 2, 6, 7, 8, 9, 11)
- Kostas Miliotakis – orchestration, programming, keyboards, bass (tracks: 3, 9, 10)
- Alkis Misirlis – drums (tracks: 2, 8, 11)
- Andreas Mouzakis – drums (tracks: 3, 4, 5, 7, 9, 10)
- Arsenis Nasis – percussion (tracks: 9)
- Alex Panagi – backing vocals (tracks: 1, 2, 6, 7, 8, 9, 11)
- Christos Pertsinidis – guitars (tracks: 3, 9, 10)
- Kostas Platakis – orchestration, programming, bouzouki (tracks: 5)
- Manolis Platakis – guitars (tracks: 5)
- Evita Sereti – backing vocals (tracks: 5)
- Nikos Vardis – bass (tracks: 5)
- Panagiotis Vasiliou – percussion (tracks: 4)
- Vaggelis Vasiliou – orchestration, programming, keyboards (tracks: 4, 12)
- Alexandros Vourazelis – orchestration, programming, keyboards (tracks: 1, 2, 6, 7, 8, 11)
- Giannis Zoumis – keyboards (tracks: 5)

=== Production ===
- Takis Argiriou – sound engineer, mix engineer (tracks: 3, 9, 10)
- Aris Binis – sound engineer, mix engineer (tracks: 1, 2, 6, 7, 8, 11)
- Thodoris Chrisanthopoulos – mastering
- Vaso Georgiadi – hair styling, make up
- Giorgos Kalfamanolis – photographer
- Giannis Kifonidis – production manager, sound engineer, mix engineer (tracks: 4, 12)
- Kostas Miliotakis – production manager (tracks: 3, 9, 10)
- Dimitris Mitsianis – artwork
- Lefteris Neromiliotis – sound engineer, mix engineer (tracks: 5)
- Kostas Platakis – production manager (tracks: 5)
- Alexandros Vourazelis – production manager (tracks: 1, 2, 6, 7, 8, 11)

== Charts ==
Sfera Stin Kardia made its debut at number 15 on the 'Top 50 Greek Albums' charts by IFPI.

After months, it was certified gold according to sales.

Chart	Provider	Peak position	Certification
Top 50 Greek Albums	IFPI	15	Gold
