= Sabrina (Greek singer) =

Sabrina Σαμπρίνα
- Born: Alexandra-Sabrina Tserkanou; 29 September 1969 (age 56); Bulawayo, Rhodesia (now Zimbabwe)
- Origin: Greece
- Genres: Laïko, pop, dance
- Occupation: Singer
- Instruments: Vocals, piano
- Years active: 1987–present
- Labels: PolyGram, BMG, Alpha Records, Virus Music, Heaven Music

Sabrina (Greek: Σαμπρίνα), born as Alexandra-Sabrina Tserkanou (Greek: Αλεξάνδρα-Σαμπρίνα Τσερκάνου), is a Greek pop singer who was born on 29 September 1969 in Bulawayo, Rhodesia (today Zimbabwe) to Greek parents.

== Career ==
Sabrina took piano and voice lessons from an early age. She made her debut in 1992 with the album Stin Aggalia Mou Ela. In her next two albums Eleftheri and Ego tha Ime Ego, she tried her skills at composing; she follows with three additional releases Geitonies tou Feggariou, Epikindino Paihnidi, and Ipopsies. In 1994, she teamed up with Costas Charitodiplomenos to compose Ftes. The song is entered in the OGAE Song Contest and won, bringing the trophy for the first time to Greece.

In 2000, she released the album Boom Boom and in 2002 the album Breakfast Time. In 2003, she participated in the Greek national final for Eurovision with the song Camera -a dance anthem- and ranked 3rd in the public choice. She first released a re-release of Breakfast Time along with the single Camera and also released her next studio album Agori Mou. In 2004 she returned with a more dance-pop orientated record called Se Vlepo. 2006 saw Sabrina return to a more traditional Greek sound with her eleventh studio album I Agapi Pote Den Pethainei. In 2007 she released her twelfth and last studio album thus far Yperparagogi. Sabrina promoted the record with appearances on television.

In her career Sabrina has gradually performed at many of the most famous nightclubs in Greece.

== Personal life ==
Sabrina was married to Panagiotis Liadelis from 2004 to 2008. The couple has one son.

== Discography ==
=== Studio albums ===
- Στην Αγκαλιά Μου Έλα (1992)
- Ελεύθερη (1993)
- Εγώ Θα Είμαι Εδώ (1994)
- Στις Γειτονιές Του Φεγγαριού (1995)
- Φεγγάρια Καθρέφτες (1996)
- Επικίνδυνο Παιχνίδι (1997)
- Υποψίες (1998)
- Μπουμ Μπουμ (2000)
- Ώρα για πρωινό (2002)
- Αγόρι Μου (2003)
- Φωτογραφική Μηχανή (2003)
- Σε Βλέπω (2004)
- Η Αγαπη Ποτε Δεν Πεθαινει (2006)
- Υπερπαραγωγή (2007)

=== Compilation albums ===
- Χτυποκάρδια Του '60 (1988)

=== Single&EPs ===
- Apomythopoieisai (2013)
- Ti Travame Kai Meis Oi Horeutries (2016)

=== Duets ===
- "Phones" (with Costas Charitodiplomenos) (1996)
- "Den Boro" (ft. Stamatis Gonidis) (1997)
- "Achoristes" (with Effie Sarri) (2000)
- "Tha 'Thela Na Imouna Tragoudi" (featuring Dimos Beke) (2002)
- Ehoun Skasei Ap' Tin Zilia (with Petros Imvrios) (2007)
- "D.N.A" (with Ioanna Coutalidou) (2008)
- "Oti Thes Me Kaneis" (feat. Stathis Kios) (2017)
- "S'Eho Eroteutei" (ft. Costas Charitodiplomenos) (2021)
