= Oute Ki Esi =

Oute Ki Esi Ούτε Κι Εσύ

EP by Marianta Pieridi
- Released: 3 July 2003
- Studio: Workshop studio
- Genre: Pop, Modern laika, Dance
- Length: 13:28
- Language: Greek
- Label: Universal Music Greece; Polydor
- Producer: Alexandros Vourazelis

Marianta Pieridi chronology
I Gineka Tis Zois Sou (2002)	Oute Ki Esi; Ούτε Κι Εσύ (2003)	Vale Fantasia (2003)

Singles from Oute Ki Esi
- 1. "Meine Dipla Mou" Released: 23 May 2003; 2. "Oute Ki Esi" Released: 30 June 2003; 3. "Rotisa" Released: 28 July 2003

Oute Ki Esi (Greek: Ούτε Κι Εσύ; English: Neither You) is an EP by Greek singer, Marianta Pieridi. It was released on 3 July 2003 by Universal Music Greece and later certified gold, selling 10,000 units. It was entirely written and produced by Alexandros Vourazelis prior to the upcoming full album Vale Fantasia, including her big hit "Meine Dipla Mou".

== Tracklist ==
All music is composed by Alexandros Vourazelis.

No.	Title	Lyrics	Length
1.	"Oute Ki Esi" (Ούτε Κι Εσύ; Neither You)	Natalia Germanou	4:42
2.	"Meine Dipla Mou" (Μείνε Δίπλα Μου; Stay By My Side)	Vaggelis Konstantinidis	4:41
3.	"Rotisa" (Ρώτησα; I Asked)	Vaggelis Konstantinidis	4:05
Total length:			13:28

== Singles ==
The following singles were officially released to radio stations, some of them with music videos, and gained massive airplay:

1. "Meine Dipla Mou" (Stay By My Side)
2. "Oute Ki Esi" (Neither You)
3. "Rotisa" (I Asked)

== Credits ==
Credits adapted by liner notes.

=== Personnel ===
- Yiannis Bithikotsis – bouzouki, cura, baglama (3)
- Giorgos Chatzopoulos – guitars
- Vasilis Eliadis – säz, cümbüş (2)
- Katerina Kyriakou – backing vocals
- Kostas Liolios – drums (3)
- Phedon Lionoudakis – accordion (2, 3)
- Alex Panayi – backing vocals
- Alexandros Vourazelis – orchestration, programming, keyboards

=== Production ===
- Al Giga – styling
- Christos Hatzistamou – mastering
- Dimitris Horianopoulos – sound engineer, mix engineer
- Giorgos Kalfamanolis – photographer
- Panos Kalitsis – hair styling, make up
- Dimitris Panayiotakopoulos – art direction
- Alexandros Vourazelis – production manager
