= Mariada Pieridi =

Greek Cypriot pop singer (born 1973)

Mariada Pieridi Μαριάντα Πιερίδη
- Born: Maria Adamadia Pieridi Soi; Nicosia, Cyprus
- Genres: Laiko, Laiko-pop, pop, dance
- Occupations: musician, songwriter
- Years active: 1995-present
- Labels: Nitro, Universal Greece, Virus
- Website: Official website

Mariada Pieridi (Greek: Μαριάντα Πιερίδη, pronounced [mariˌada pçeˈriði]; is a Greek Cypriot pop singer.

== Early life ==
Mariada Pieridi was born in Nicosia, Cyprus. Her father was an officer in the Greek Navy and her mother was a lawyer in Cyprus. She has a younger brother, Dimitri.

Pieridi and her family moved to Athens when she was a child. She soon began to experiment with music and sports. She was on the Pan-Hellenic Gymnastics Association (PGS) for nine years and started playing the piano. Music became an integral part of her life and when she reached high school, she decided that she wanted a career in the music industry. She then took speech classes at the Attica Conservatory and continued with piano lessons.

== Career ==
=== 1995: Eurovision ===
Pieridi got her first real break into the music industry during the 1995 Eurovision Song Contest in Dublin, Ireland. She was the backing vocalist of the Greek entry to the contest performed by Elina Konstantopoulou. They sang the song "Pia Prosefhi". After Eurovision, Pieridi performed with many popular singers including Despina Vandi, Antonis Remos, Kaiti Garbi and Yiannis Parios, getting her name and voice known.

=== 2002–present ===
In June 2002, Pieridi released her first album, I Gineka Tis Zois Sou ("The Woman of Your Life"), which was a success and moved her into the mainstream. Also in 2002, at the Arion Music Awards she received the award for "Best New Artist". July 2003 marked the release of Pieridi's first single, "Oute Ki Esi" ("Neither You"), and the album Vale Fantasia (Use Your Imagination) was released three months later in October. Over the following years, she went on to release two more albums, Abra Katabra and Sfera Stin Kardia (Bullet In The Heart).

In September 2006, she returned with the single "DJ". It is a remake of Swedish singer Carola Häggkvist's "Stanna Eller Ga". The lyrics of all of the songs on the CD are signed off for the first time by Pieridi herself. A few days after the release of the single, Pieridi released her first "best of" album, DJ - The Hits Collection. In mid-December 2008, she released her fifth studio album, Se Prokalo, nine songs, including the single "Milia Makria".

== Discography ==
=== Albums ===
- 2002: I Gineka Tis Zois Sou
- 2003: Vale Fantasia
- 2004: Abra Katabra
- 2005: Sfera Stin Kardia
- 2006: DJ - The Hits Collection
- 2008: Se Prokalo

=== Digital Songs ===
- 2009: Fantasia thelei mono (DJ Krazy Kon feat Mariada Pieridi)
- 2010: Pathima Mathima

=== Singles ===
- 2003: "Oute Ki Esi"
- 2006: "DJ"
- 2008: "Tha Doso Resta"

== Filmography ==
=== Television ===
Year	Title	Role	Notes	Reference
1995	Eurovision Song Contest 1995	Herself (performance)	Vocalist of Greece's team	
2004	MAD Video Music Awards	Herself (performance)	TV special	
2008	The Secrets of Edem	Herself	1 episode	
2012-2013	Dancing with the Stars	Herself (contestant)	4 episodes; season 3	
2023	Just the 2 of Us	Herself (contestant)	17 episodes; season 7	
2023	Summer Yes	Herself (host)	Morning talk show on Open TV	
2024	Summer's Cool	Herself (host)	Daytime talk show on Skai TV	

=== Music videos ===
Year	Music video	Artist	Notes
1993	"It's a lie"	VIPS	as a dancer
1993	"I Celebrate"	Thanos Kalliris	as an actress
2002	"I Love You"	Herself	
2003	"Stand by me"	Herself	
2003	"Rise your hands"	Herself	
2003	"One"	Herself	
2003	"Wrong chemistry"	Herself	
2003	"Hurry up"	Herself	
2004	"Put fantasy on"	Herself	
2004	"Goodbyes"	Herself	
2004	"The Biggest Dreams"	Herself	
2004	"Around me"	Herself	
2005	"This love"	Herself	
2006	"DJ"	Herself	
2007	"I will give change"	Herself	
