= Nomads (TV series) =

- Genre: Reality
- Presented by: Grigoris Arnaoutoglou (1); Savvas Poumbouras (2); George Lentzas (2)
- Country of origin: Greece
- Original language: Greek
- No. of seasons: 2
- No. of episodes: 105

Original release
- Network: ANT1
- Release: October 2, 2017 – December 23, 2018

Nomads is the Greek reality competition television series that debuted on October 2, 2017, on ANT1. It is based on the Colombian reality competition television series, Desafío.

The first season took place in Palawan, Philippines, for 12 weeks and the second season took place in Nosy Be, Madagascar. The winner wins €150,000. First season featured 22 players divided into three teams: Fire, Oceans, Jungle. Second season featured 28 players divided into three teams:Lemurians, Crocodiles and Invaders. Apostolia Zoi was the winner of the first season and Stelios Hantampakis was the winner of the second season.

== Series overview ==
List of Nomads (Greece) series
Series	Series premiere	Series finale	Location	Presenter	Initial Tribes	Winner	Runner-up	Third place
1	October 2, 2017	December 22, 2017	Palawan, Philippines	Grigoris Arnaoutoglou	Three tribes of seven	Apostolia Zoi	Konstantinos Oroklos	Giorgos Mavridis
2	October 11, 2018	December 23, 2018	Nosy Be, Madagascar	Savvas Poumbouras, Giorgos Lentzas	Two tribes of ten and later a third tribe of eight	Stelios Hantampakis	Grigoris Morgan	Darya Turovnic

== Rules ==
The rules of the game for every week:

- Week starts with the Territory game. The winning tribe will live in a villa for this week, the runner-up tribe will live in a local village and the last one will live on a beach.

Every week tribes have a captain who changes at the start of the next one. The player who is eliminated chooses next week's captains.

- Second Day: First Immunity Game. Loser tribe nominates two players for elimination. One by captain and one by the rest of the tribe.
- Third Day: Second Immunity Game. Loser tribe from the first Immunity Game does not play here. Loser tribe of this game nominates one player for elimination.
- Fourth Day: Captains' Game. Winner takes reward for the tribe.
- Fifth and Final Day: Duel. At first, one player is saved from public vote. Then, the two remaining players duel in a series of matches with the loser being eliminated from Nomads.

From week 4(instead of week 6 as it was planned), with only two tribes existing (Fire and Oceans in this season) the rules changed a bit:

- Second Day: First Immunity Game. Loser tribe nominates one player for Duel.
- Third Day: Second Immunity Game. This immunity is individual. The rest of the players go to public vote. The player with the fewest votes goes to Duel.

From week 9, tribes no longer exist and players merge.

- First Day: Territory Game. Winner takes one person with him in villa. The rest of the players stay on the beach.
- Second Day: First Immunity Game. Individual Immunity. Loser player is nominated. One extra player is nominated by vote.
- Third Day: Second Immunity Game. Same as the first Immunity Game.
- For Duel, from the four nominated players, by public vote, two players are nominated to Duel.

For the last weeks, the following rules take place.

- No Territory Games. All players live at the beach.
- After all players agree, €50,000 from the final prize can be won by players at different games.
- Immunity Game: Two losers are nominated. One extra player is nominated by vote.
- Duel: From the three nominated players, by public vote, two players are nominated to Duel.
