= Poios thelei na ginei ekatommyriouchos =

Greek television quiz show

- Logo since 2022
- Greek: Ποιος θέλει να γίνει εκατομμυριούχος
- Presented by: Spiros Papadopoulos (1999–2004); Thodoris Atheridis (2006); Grigoris Arnaoutoglou (2022-)
- Country of origin: Greece
- Original language: Greek
- No. of seasons: 11

Production
- Running time: c.45–60 min.(including commercials)
- Production companies: Pearson Television (1999–2001); FremantleMedia (2002–2006); JK Productions (2022-)

Original release
- Network: Mega Channel (1999–2002); ERT (2002–2004); Alpha TV (2006); ANT1 (2022-)
- Release: October 4, 1999 – present

Related
- Millionaire Hot Seat

Ποιος θέλει να γίνει εκατομμυριούχος (English translation: Who wants to become a millionaire?, transliteration: Poios thelei na ginei ekatommyriouchos) is a Greek game show based on the original British format Who Wants to Be a Millionaire? debuted in 1999 on Mega Channel. In 2010, the show was chosen as the most popular game show in 20 years of Mega Channel programming. From 1999 to 2004 the show was hosted by Spiros Papadopoulos; in 2006, by Thodoris Atheridis; and from 2022 onward, by Grigoris Arnaoutoglou. The show was broadcast from 1999 to 2002 on Mega Channel, from 2002 to 2004 on the ERT channels, in 2006 on Alpha TV and from 2022 onward on ANT1.

== Rules ==
=== Main game ===
The player had to answer 15 questions correctly in order to win ₯50 million up to 2001, €150,000 up to 2004, €250,000 in 2006, and €100,000 from 2022 onward.

=== Lifeline ===
There were three lifelines: fifty-fifty (50:50), phone a friend and ask the audience, but in 2006, the "switch the question" lifeline was added, but if a contestant wanted to use it, he had to give up one of his other lifelines. In 2024, the "switch the question" lifeline returned for the a select number of specials that air on Sundays.

== Payout structure ==
Question number	Question value (Yellow zones are the guaranteed levels)					
Question number	October 1999	1999-2001	2002-04	2006	2022–present	Grand Prize Week (2026–present)
1	₯20,000 (€58)	₯50,000 (€146)	€100	€100	€100	€300
2	₯30,000 (€88)	₯75,000 (€220)	€200	€200	€200	€600
3	₯40,000 (€117)	₯100,000 (€293)	€300	€300	€300	€800
4	₯70,000 (€205)	₯150,000 (€440)	€400	€500	€400	€1,000
5	₯100,000 (€293)	₯200,000 (€586)	€500	€1,000	€500	€2,000
6	₯150,000 (€440)	₯400,000 (€1,173)	€1,000	€1,500	€1,000	€3,000
7	₯300,000 (€880)	₯600,000 (€1,760)	€1,500	€2,000	€2,000	€4,000
8	₯600,000 (€1,760)	₯800,000 (€2,347)	€2,000	€3,500	€3,000	€6,000
9	₯1,000,000 (€2,934)	₯1,600,000 (€4,695)	€4,000	€5,000	€4,000	€8,000
10	₯2,000,000 (€5,869)	₯2,000,000 (€5,869)	€5,000	€7,500	€5,000	€10,000
11	₯3,000,000 (€8,804)	₯3,000,000 (€8,804)	€10,000	€10,000	€10,000	€20,000
12	₯6,000,000 (€17,608)	₯6,000,000 (€17,608)	€20,000	€20,000	€15,000	€30,000
13	₯12,000,000 (€35,216)	₯12,000,000 (€35,216)	€40,000	€50,000	€20,000	€50,000
14	₯25,000,000 (€73,367)	₯24,000,000 (€70,432)	€80,000	€100,000	€30,000	€90,000
15	₯50,000,000 (€146,735)	₯50,000,000 (€146,735)	€150,000	€250,000	€100,000	€300,000

== Season overview ==
Season		Host	Top prize	Network	Premiere date	End date	Broadcasting schedule
1		Spiros Papadopoulos	₯ 50,000,000	Mega	October 4, 1999	June 30, 2000	Monday to Friday 7:10 pm (Fall to early Winter); Monday to Friday 7 pm (mid-Winter to Spring); Monday to Friday 6:50 pm (late Spring to season finale)
2		Spiros Papadopoulos	₯ 50,000,000	Mega	September 18, 2000	June 29, 2001	Monday to Friday 6:45 pm (Fall to Winter); Monday to Friday 6:40 pm (Spring to season finale)
3		Spiros Papadopoulos	₯ 50,000,000	Mega	September 17, 2001	December 31, 2001	Monday to Friday 6:40 pm
3		Spiros Papadopoulos	€ 150,000	Mega	January 1, 2002	June 28, 2002	Monday to Friday 6:40 pm (until April); Monday to Friday 7:10 pm (April to season finale)
4		Spiros Papadopoulos	€ 150,000	NET	November 4, 2002	April 2, 2003	Monday to Friday 8:15 pm
4		Spiros Papadopoulos	€ 150,000	ET1	April 28, 2003	July 4, 2003	Monday to Friday 7:40 pm (Spring); Monday to Friday 8:10 pm (Summer)
5		Spiros Papadopoulos	€ 150,000	NET	September 15, 2003	May 28, 2004	Monday to Friday 8:10 pm
6		Thodoris Atheridis	€ 250,000	Alpha TV	April 10, 2006	July 28, 2006	Monday to Friday 7 pm
7		Grigoris Arnaoutoglou	€ 100,000	ANT1	April 25, 2022	July 31, 2022	Monday to Friday 8 pm
8	Part I	Grigoris Arnaoutoglou	€ 100,000	ANT1	September 19, 2022	October 14, 2022	Monday to Friday 8 pm
8	Part II	Grigoris Arnaoutoglou	€ 100,000	ANT1	November 29, 2022	December 23, 2022	Monday to Friday 7:45 pm (During the FIFA World Cup 2022); Monday to Friday 8 pm
8	Part III	Grigoris Arnaoutoglou	€ 100,000	ANT1	January 28, 2023	April 9, 2023	Weekends 8 pm
8	Part III	Grigoris Arnaoutoglou	€ 100,000	ANT1	April 10, 2023	July 9, 2023	Monday to Saturday 8 pm
9		Grigoris Arnaoutoglou	€ 100,000	ANT1	September 24, 2023	July 5, 2024	Sunday 8 pm (premiere); Monday to Friday 8 pm (September 25-November 3, 2023, April 29 –July 5, 2024); Friday to Sunday 8 pm (November 10, 2023 – April 28, 2024)
10		Grigoris Arnaoutoglou	€ 100,000	ANT1	September 23, 2024	July 3, 2025	Monday to Friday 8 pm (September 23, 2024 – November 8, 2024, April 14-July 3, 2025); Thursday-Sunday 8 pm (November 14, 2024 – April 13, 2025)
11		Grigoris Arnaoutoglou	€ 100,000 € 300,000 (Grand Prize Week)	ANT1	October 6, 2025	July 5, 2026	Monday to Saturday 8 pm (October 6, 2025 – November 1, 2025); Thursday to Sunday 8 pm (November 6, 2025–present)
11		Grigoris Arnaoutoglou	€ 100,000 € 300,000 (Grand Prize Week)	ANT1	September 21, 2026	2027	Monday to Friday 8 pm

== Winners of the grand prizes ==
There have been four winners.

=== Giorgos Georgopoulos (October 2, 2001) ===
Giorgos Georgopoulos (Γιώργος Γεωργόπουλος) won ₯50 million by correctly answering the question:

₯50,000,000 (15 of 15)

What is depicted on the road sign which indicates the existence of a restaurant?

1. Fork next to knife
2. Fork next to spoon
3. Fork and knife crossed
4. Fork and spoon crossed(correct answer)

=== Nikos Georgiou (c. October–December 2001) ===
Nikos Georgiou (Νίκος Γεωργίου) won ₯50 million. It is unknown what his winning question was, but his win occurred after Giorgos Georgopoulos' win.

=== Stelios Stergiou (November 21, 2003) ===
Stelios Stergiou (Στέλιος Στεργίου) won €150,000 by correctly answering the question:

€150,000 (15 of 15)

Which of the following is not depicted in the symbol of the Olympic Truce?

1. The Olympic rings
2. The Olympic flame
3. The dove of peace
4. An olive branch(correct answer)

=== Filippos Bekiaris (April 29, 2025) ===
Filippos Bekiaris (Φίλιππος Μπεκιάρης) won €100,000 by correctly answering the question:

€100,000 (15 of 15)

How is the name "Hong Kong" translated?

1. Beautiful harbor
2. Calm harbor
3. Fragrant harbor(correct answer)
4. Deep harbor

== Losers of the grand prizes ==
Only one contestant has reached the final question and answered it incorrectly.

=== Michalis Mavrogenis (January 30, 2001) ===
Michalis Mavrogenis (Μιχάλης Μαυρογένης) lost ₯22 million and won ₯2 million by incorrectly answering the question:

₯50,000,000 (15 of 15)

Who is the mother of the children of Zebedee?

1. Elizabeth
2. Magdalena
3. Marta(chosen; incorrect answer)
4. Salome(correct answer)

Michalis Mavrogenis reappeared on the show 22 years later, in November 2023 and won €500, answering incorrectly on the 9th question
