= Annet Artani =

Greek-American singer and songwriter (born 1976)

Annet Artani Αννέτ Αρτάνη
- Also known as: Annet Artani
- Born: Annette Denise Stamatelatos; 6 September 1976 (age 49); New York City, New York
- Genres: Pop rock, R&B, soul
- Occupation: Singer-songwriter
- Instrument: Vocals
- Years active: 1994–present
- Labels: Virus Music (2005–2008); Ultra Records (2008–present)
- Website: www.annetartani.com

Annette Denise Stamatelatos (born 6 September 1976), better known by her stage name Annet Artani (Αννέτ Αρτάνη in Greek), is a Greek-American singer and songwriter. She is best known for representing Cyprus in the Eurovision Song Contest 2006 with the song "Why Angels Cry", as well as co-writing the worldwide hit "Everytime" with Britney Spears.

Artani was signed to Ultra Records and her debut single "Alive" was released in March 2009.

== Early life ==
Artani was born Annette Denise Stamatelatos in Flushing, New York to Gregory and Julia Stamatelatos. Her family originates from the village of Karavados on the island of Kefalonia, Greece. She is named after her maternal grandmother, Anneta, and she chose to use her paternal grandmother's first name, Artani, in her stage name, as a dedication to both of them. While in the US she uses the name "Annette", she was advised to spell it "Annet" in Europe to avoid being called Annet-Te. She graduated from Queens College and received an associate's degree from Five Towns College.

Artani and her older sister Diana, who also sings, formed a rock band named Nootropia (Mindset), singing in Greek, and promoted on National Greek TV (NGTV) and AKTINA FM. The group sang Greek rock songs which were fused with classical elements.

== Musical career ==
=== 1994–2002: Beginnings ===
Artani expressed her interest and love for music at a young age, particularly in offerings of such greats as Etta James, Aretha Franklin, Michael Jackson, and Madonna. After her early days singing with her sister, Artani decided that a solo career would suit her best. She received a scholarship from BMG for writing and performing her original song titled "Summer Days", and has also won several talent titles in America's Favorite Pageants, the New York Star Pageant, the Ophelia Devoure Talent Connection, and has been featuring in both Pageantry and Billboard Magazine.

Over the years, Artani incorporated influences of singing in her college Gospel choir, as well as listening to R&B, pop and rock music. She started off her singing career as an opening act for Mando, a Greek pop star, and was featured in her own summer concert in 1995. She collaborated with several accomplished writers in New York City such as Jeff Franzel, who's written for NSYNC and played with Frank Sinatra, and Alex Forbes who has written for Taylor Dayne and Cyndi Lauper, among others.

=== 2002–2004: Working with Britney Spears and "Everytime" ===
While singing as a singer-songwriter in clubs all over New York City, Artani received a phone call from a friend saying that she should audition to be a backing vocalist for Britney Spears. She was called back and informed that she would be on The Rosie O'Donnell Show with Spears and would subsequently be a part of the Dream Within a Dream Tour. Her interactions with Spears during most of the tour were limited to small conversations at the gym and vocal warm ups. Artani had begun a relationship with the show's musical director during 2002; however, it was not working out well by the end of the tour. Before the last date in Mexico City, Spears called her and asked about the relationship. Artani told her they were going to break up, to which Spears responded, "Don't worry about it, you're going to hang out with me". Following the end of the tour, Spears and Artani began to forge a friendship. Spears invited Artani to her house in Los Angeles, California. According to Artani, their relationship grew out of their shared romantic experiences at the time. She explained, "Basically, we commiserated because she, at that time, had broken up with Justin [Timberlake]. Maybe like nine months before, but of course it was really fresh in the media. I was just breaking up with this guy, so we kind of like—I think we kind of needed each other." Artani stayed at Spears's house for a few weeks, in which they started writing songs at the piano. Shortly after, they traveled to Lake Como in Lombardy, Italy. Artani added, "It was me and her, her stylist and Felicia, and we had this humongous house to ourselves, and they had a piano there as well".

Artani was managed at the time by American music manager Andrian Adams. In lieu of a management fee, she gave Adams a 7 per cent share of the publishing rights to "Everytime", which, according to the Financial Times, he subsequently auctioned on eBay in October 2005, selling it to a music industry executive for £97,300.

According to Artani, "Everytime" was written in large part as a response to "Cry Me a River" as well as various radio interviews. Artani explained, "He was getting personal. Here, she had a different type of image, and he was really exposing some stuff that she probably didn't want out there, and in front of her little sister ... I remember her sister being mortified and her being mortified. I'm sure that that really hurt her." "Everytime" was recorded at Conway Studios in Los Angeles and mixed at Frou Frou Central in London, England. "Everytime" was released as a single on 17 May 2004 through Jive Records, and was positively received by critics, who complimented its simple lyrics and the organic feel of the song. The single also achieved commercial success, peaking inside the top five in most countries, while reaching the top of the charts in Australia, Hungary, Ireland and the United Kingdom.

=== 2004–2006: Start of solo career and Eurovision 2006 ===
In 2004, Artani entered the third edition of the Greek reality singing show Fame Story. She was brought in along with three others after the show had already started. A month into her participation, Artani "walked off the show" after refusing to sign a multi-year contract which she was being pressured into signing during her time on the show. She stated that her departure was a "huge scandal at the time in Greece". Although she didn't win, she had established a large fan base and signed a record deal with Virus Music, which led to the release of the single "Goodbye Amor", which became popular.

In 2006, she was invited by Cyprus Broadcasting Corporation to take part in the Cypriot selection show for the Eurovision Song Contest 2006. On 22 February, the public selected the Cypriot entry from 20 songs during the final round of a show entitled "A Song For Europe" where Artani won the majority of the votes for her ballad "Why Angels Cry", even though she was suffering from laryngitis. After the show, the song was tweaked a bit for Eurovision by adding the Russian philharmonic in its orchestration. She represented Cyprus in Athens at the Contest's semi-final. She later released her first studio album Mia Foni, which featured songs in both Greek and English; the album reached the top ten on the Greek Albums Chart.

=== 2007–present: "Alive" and new album ===
In December 2007, Artani was approached by Greece's Hellenic Radio and Television to be considered as one of the possible entrants to represent Greece in the Eurovision Song Contest 2008. She wrote three candidate songs, however, she never submitted them after talking it over with the network and realizing the strings attached. She had already left her Greek record label Virus Music and had signed to a label in the United States, but by submitting the songs, she would have to be signed to a Greek label once again, which would have meant unsigning in the US. Artani felt that it would be better to be obligated to her US label instead as it could do more for her career.

Artani signed with Ultra Records in the United States, and began recording her first English language album. The first single is "Alive" which she performed at club Duvet on 19 December for her then management company SWAP's holiday party. "Alive" was released as an eight-track digital download on 31 March 2009 through iTunes and was accompanied by a music video in the months succeeding. It was then licensed by Ultra Records worldwide and became available in all iTunes music stores.

In an interview with Radio International on 18 November 2009, Artani announced that she was working on her second single which was produced by Swedish producer Ishi Mughal and described it as a "sort of" remake of The Supremes 1966 hit "You Keep Me Hangin' On". During the interview, she played an exclusive clip of the unfinalized song as well as the previously unheard song "Nothing Lasts". She ended the interview by playing a new version of her song "Too Late" which was remixed by her friend Greg Christos.

In 2010, Artani also wrote the song "Nothing Lasts Forever" with Canadian producers C2, which became a hit in Korean Pop, performed by Korean pop group, Girls Day. In 2011, Artani released "Mouthful of Me", shot in Joshua Tree National Park by Norwegian director Torgeir Ensrud, which went viral. In 2012, Artani signed with American Bombshells Entertainment, under the alter ego of "Nettie" and performed for veterans and troops all over the world, as well as on NBC's "The Winner Is" on 11 July 2013. In 2013, Artani was signed with Notting Hill Music Publishing in the United Kingdom and was writing songs for artists internationally.

She is also a member of Identity Crisis, a funk fusion band based in New York, which toured the east coast.

In 2019, Artani was a political activist and lead singer of Citizens United Protest Band.

== Personal life ==
Artani married talent agent Kirk Ceballos in a Greek Orthodox ceremony held on 3 July 2010 at Saints Constantine and Helen Cathedral in Brooklyn, with their nuptials covered by Greek People Magazine, among other media from Greece. The two had been dating since May 2008. However, Artani filed for divorce in 2011 that was issued in 2012.

== Discography ==
=== Albums ===
- 2006: Mia Foni

=== Maxi singles ===
- 2005: "Goodbye Amor"
- 2006: "Why Angels Cry"
- 2009: "Alive"
- 2011: "Mouthful of Me"
- 2012: "You Asked for It"

=== Credit as writer ===
- 2004: "Everytime" performed by Britney Spears
- 2010: "Nothing Lasts Forever" performed by Girl's Day

Preceded by Constantinos Christoforou with "Ela Ela (Come Baby)"	Cyprus in the Eurovision Song Contest; 2006	Succeeded by Evridiki with "Comme Ci, Comme Ça"
