= Kelly Kelekidou (album) =

Studio album by Kelly Kelekidou
- Released: December 2005
- Genre: Pop, Dance, Modern Laika
- Length: 44:02
- Label: Sony BMG Greece/Columbia

Kelly Kelekidou chronology
Kelly Kelekidou (2005)	Sygkentrosou (2006)

Kelly Kelekidou is the debut album of popular Greek singer, Kelly Kelekidou. It was released in Greece in December 2005 by Sony BMG Greece.

== Track listing ==
1. "Glyka Glyka Glykia Mou" - 4:04
2. "Ma To Theo" - 3:30
3. "Kratise Me Dinata" - 3:11
4. "Mi Mou Milas" - 4:53
5. "Mou Rihnis Tin Efthini" - 3:14
6. "Thlimmeno Koritsaki" - 3:18
7. "Lathos Andras" - 3:11
8. "Pia Itan Toso Diki Sou" - 4:22
9. "Zo Gia Mena" - 3:17
10. "Etsi" - 3:34
11. "Signomi" - 3:40
12. "Ena Dakri" - 3:54
