= Kelly Kelekidou =

Greek singer (born 1979)

Kelly Kelekidou Κέλλυ Κελεκίδου
- Born: 9 April 1979 (age 47); Greece
- Origin: Thessaloniki, Greece
- Genres: Modern laika, Pop-folk, dance
- Years active: 2005–present
- Labels: Sony Music Greece (2005-2009); Heaven Music (2009-2011)
- Website: http://www.kellykelekidou.dom.gr

Kelly Kelekidou (Greek: Κέλλυ Κελεκίδου, born 9 April 1979), sometimes referred to as Kel Kel, is a Greek singer. To date, she has released four studio albums and one CD Single which was certified Gold.

== Career ==
Kelly Kelekidou originates from Kokkinohoma Kavala, Greece and Hamilo Kilkis. Shortly after graduating high school, she started studying business management and nursing, although she had not decided on a career. She also became interested in music and took four years of vocal training at the Contemporary Conservatoire of Thessaloniki, as well as one year of lessons in Byzantine music.

Shortly after, Kelekidou started performing at clubs in Thessaloniki. In 2005, Kelekidou signed with Sony Music Greece, and released her first album which was self-titled which peaked at number 16 on the IFPI album charts. The first single off the album was "Glyka Glyka Glykia Mou", a remake of a traditional Laïko song by Giota Halkia. The single was a hit, while that same year, she also performed in Athens with Christos Dantis and Nikos Kourkoulis at club Gkazi.

In late 2006, Kelekidou started appearing alongside Nikos Kourkoulis at club Fos. That same year, she released her second album titled Sygkentrosou, which peaked at number 11 on the IFPI album charts.

In the summer of 2007, Kelekidou appeared at club Romeo with Dionisis Makris and Kostas Martakis. In November of the same year, she released a CD-Single titled "Se Thelo Me Trela", which was peaked at number 1 on the singles chart, and was certified Gold within a few days.

In March 2008, Kelekidou started a one-month appearance with Giorgos Tsalikis at club Andro Peiraios. In April 2010, Kelekidou released her third album titled Makria Sou Den Iparho. Around the same time, she also started appearances with Nikos Kourkoulis at club ORAMA in Thessaloniki. Following their appearances in Thessaloniki, in July 2008 Kelly Kelekidou and Nikos Kourkoulis went on a mini-tour in Australia, performing 3 sold-out concerts in Adelaide, Sydney and Melbourne.

In late 2008, Kelekidou stated appearances with Nikos Oikonomopoulos, Giorgos Tsalikis, and Maria Iakovou at club FIX. In October 2008, Kelly Kelekidou released her new duet titled "Ksenoi" with singer Kostas Karafotis.

In June 2009, it was officially confirmed that Kelly Kelekidou left Sony Music Greece and signed to Heaven Music. Shortly after, Kelekidou released a new digital single titled "Kalimera (Kalosirthes Agapi)", a retro sounding pop song, substantially different in style to her previous material. On September 13, 2010, Kelekidou released a new single titled "Teleftaia Fora", with music and lyrics by Giorgos Moukidis. She is expected to release her new album in late September. For the 2010-2011 winter season, Kelekidou will be singing alongside Nikos Kourkoulis and Kostas Karafotis at club Teatro.

On 1 December 2010, Kelekidou released her fourth studio album titled Aggeli Stin Kolasi (Angels in hell), featuring ten songs including an all new duet with Nikos Kourkoulis. In January 2011, Kelekidou has embarked on a North American tour with Kourkoulis, performing in Montreal, Chicago, Boston, Toronto, and Atlantic City.

Since her return to Greece in 2018 (after having lived in Australia since 2014), she is now signed with the record label Panik Platinum and has released a new single Sti Thessaloniki.

== Personal life ==
In 2004, Kelekidou began dating Greek singer Nikos Kourkoulis whom she married on July 14, 2009. They have two children: a son Rafael (born August 13, 2009) and a daughter Elpiniki (born November 15, 2014). In 2014 they moved to Darwin, Australia but returned to Greece in 2018.

== Discography ==
=== Studio albums ===
All the albums listed underneath were released and charted in Greece.

Year	Title	Certification
2005	Kelly Kelekidou	—
2006	Sygkentrosou	—
2008	Makria Sou Den Iparho	—
2010	Aggeli Stin Kolasi	—

=== CD singles ===
Year	Title	Notes
2007	"Se Thelo Me Trela"	Gold

=== Digital singles ===
Year	Title	Notes
2009	"Kalos Irthes"	—
2012	"Ki Olo Pino"	—
2018	"Sti Thessaloniki"	—

011: Ένα με σένα 2011: Με τα μάτια σκότωσε με 2012: Προχωράμε 2012: Με πειράζει 2012: Τι κουράγιο να 'χω 2012: Και τα χαλάσαμε 2012: Κι όλο πίνω 2013: Εκδηλώθηκες 2015: Μια νύχτα γνωριστήκαμε 2016: Πως να σε πιστέψω 2018: Στη Θεσσαλονίκη 2019: Δε Γράφεις Δεν Τηλεφωνείς 2019: Για Χάρη Σου
