= Apostolia Zoi =

Apostolia Zoi Αποστολία Ζώη
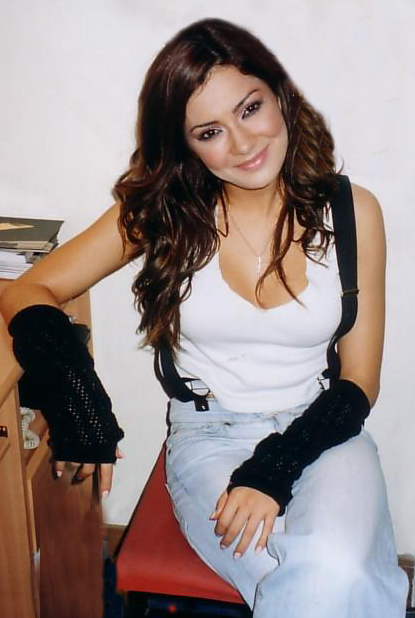
- Apostolia Zoi in 2005

Background information
- Born: Apostolia Kalambouka; 6 January 1980 (age 46); Elassona, Greece
- Origin: Greece
- Genres: Modern Laika, Pop
- Years active: 2003-Present
- Labels: Minos EMI (2003–2005), Virus Music (2005–2007), Minos EMI (2007–present)
- Website: http://www.apostoliazoi.gr/

Apostolia Zoi (Greek: Αποστολία Ζώη, Greek pronunciation: [apostoˌli.a ˈzo.i]) is a Greek singer who was born in Elassona, Greece, and she grew up in Volos. She has released four studio albums.

== Biography ==
=== Early life ===
At the age of 14, Apostolia moved to Thessaloniki to pursue her interest in diving and swimming where she graduating from the Gymnastics Academy. One night, while out on the town with friends, a singer at a popular club gave her the microphone and Zoi started to sing. The owner of the club saw her talent, and hired her to sing at his club. Apostolia soon realized that she would like to pursue a music career, and began vocal and singing lessons with Christos Lirintzi. At the same time, she was singing with well-known singers such as Vasilis Karras, Evridiki, ONE, Aggelos Dionisiou, and more. Zoi performed the duet "Maskes" with famed singer Peggy Zina at the club in her last year while living in Thessaloniki and soon left for Athens to further her career.

=== 2003: Beginnings and To Proto Vima ===
In Athens, her first year of singing in the Athenian music clubs was with Peggy Zina. Soon after, she got a record contract with Minos EMI and released her debut album To Proto Vima (The First Step) in June 2003. Writers of the album included well established composers such as Evi Droutsa, Marios Psimopoulos, Christodoulos Siganos, and more. The songs "Mi M'Akoubas" and "Shedon Pote" became hits and showcased her talent, while the latter became the theme song for the series of the same name on ERT. In the summer of 2004, she started appearances at popular club "Thalassa" with Elena Paparizou, Thanos Petrelis, and Nino where she further showcased her vocal abilities.

=== 2004–2005: Apo Do Kai Pera and "To Kalytero Doro" ===
After the summer of 2004, she left Minos EMI and signed with the newly created imprint Virus Music of the Greek independent record company Legend Recordings. In the fall of 2004, she started appearances at the club "Gazi" with Nikos Kourkoulis and Andreas Stamos. In January 2005, she released her second album under Virus titled Apo Do Kai Pera (From here on out). The single "Krima" written by Christos Dantis became a huge radio hit, and her first true big hit. The album produced many hits including "Mou Eleipses", "Apo Do Kai Pera", and "De Vazo Ego Mialo", making her a household name.

In the summer of 2005, she once again appeared at club "Thalassa", but this time with Thanos Petrelis and Kostas Karafotis. In the winter season of 2005-2006 she continued her collaboration with Petrelis, and was also joined by Katerina Stanisi at club "Apollon". During the Christmas season of 2005, Apostolia released a Christmas themed CD Single along with boyband 4Play under Virus Music titled "To Kalytero Doro" (The best gift). Nikos Terzis penned the tracks, while the CD Single also included Zoi's song "Den Eisai Tou Goustou Mou" as well as 4Play's "Pote". After her shows at club "Apollon" finished in the spring, she started singing at the club "Rodon!" with Andreas Stamos in Thessaloniki until the summer.

=== 2006–present: Th' Afisei Epohi and Me To Heri Stin Kardia ===
On May 5, 2006, Apostolia Zoi released her third studio album titled "Th' Afisei Epohi" (It will leave a history) featuring fifteen new songs. This album featured a bit of a different sound while not completely straying away from the sound of the first two albums. The titled track because a hit, while the album also featured a rap style duet with friend Gianni Tsimitseli titled "Lipstick".

In June 2007, Zoi sang a duet remix with the famous Kostas Tournas of "Geia Sou" at the "Mad Music Video Awards". For the winter season of 2007-2008, Zoi sang at "Kendro Athinon" with Giannis Ploutarhos, Tamta, and Giannis Vardis. In Fall 2007 she re-signed with her original record company Minos EMI. She then went into the studio to record new material for her fourth studio album. On June 9, 2008, Zoi released the first single "Ti stis 8, Ti stis 7" exclusively on Rythmos FM which was followed by the release of her fourth studio album Me To Heri Stin Kardia on June 23. The second single "Ki Esi Ekei", was released in mid-September 2008 with lyrics by Ilias Fillipou and music by Giorgos Kafetzopoulou.

== Nomads ==
Apostolia won the reality show Nomads and she gained 100,000 euros.

== Discography ==
=== Studio albums ===
All the albums listed underneath were released and charted in Greece and Cyprus.

Year	Title	Certification
2003	To Proto Vima	-
2005	Apo Do Kai Pera	-
2006	Th' Afisei Epohi	-
2008	Me To Heri Stin Kardia	-

=== CD singles ===
Year	Title	Peak chart positions	Album
Year	Title	GRE	Album
2005	"To Kalitero Doro" (with 4 PLAY)	3	Non-album single
