= I Gineka Tis Zois Sou =

I Gineka Tis Zois Sou Η Γυναίκα Της Ζωής Σου

Studio album by Marianda Pieridi
- Released: October 24, 2002
- Recorded: Workshop studio
- Genre: Pop, dance, contemporary laika
- Length: 51:37
- Language: Greek
- Label: Universal Music Greece; Polydor
- Producer: Sokratis Soumelas

Marianda Pieridi chronology
I Gineka Tis Zois Sou; Η Γυναίκα Της Ζωής Σου (2002)	Vale Fantasia (2003)

I Gineka Tis Zois Sou (Greek: Η Γυναίκα Της Ζωής Σου; English: The Woman Of Your Life) is the debut studio album of Greek singer Marianta Pieridi. It was released on 24 October 2002 by Universal Music Greece and Polydor and later received gold certification, selling 20,000 units in Greece.

== Track listing ==
No.	Title	Lyrics	Music	Length
1.	"S' Agapo" (Σ' Αγαπώ; I Love You)	Natalia Germanou	Alexandros Vourazelis	4:27
2.	"Anapodo Feggari" (Ανάποδο Φεγγάρι; Upside Moon)	Natalia Germanou	Alexandros Vourazelis	4:30
3.	"Me Sighoris" (Με Συγχωρείς; Excuse Me)	Ilias Filippou	Alexandros Vourazelis	4:53
4.	"De Me Halai" (Δε Με Χαλάει; It Doesn't Spoil Me)	Evi Droutsa	Sokratis Soumelas	4:05
5.	"Ase Me" (Άσε Με; Let Me)	Tasos Vougiatzis	Alexandros Vourazelis	4:48
6.	"I Gineka Tis Zois Sou" (Η Γυναίκα Της Ζωής Σου; The Woman Of Your Life)	Natalia Germanou	Alexandros Vourazelis	4:21
7.	"An Figis [Moon River]" (Αν Φύγεις; If You Leave)	Evi Droutsa	Henry Mancini; Johnny Mercer	3:05
8.	"Ela Sti Thesi Mou" (Έλα Στη Θέση Μου; Put Yourself In My Place)	Ilias Filippou	Alexandros Vourazelis	4:34
9.	"Giro Mou" (Γύρω Μου; Around Me)	Natalia Germanou	Alexandros Vourazelis; Sokratis Soumelas	4:43
10.	"De Thelo Pia" (Δε Θέλω Πια; I Don't Want Anymore)	Tasos Vougiatzis	Alexandros Vourazelis	4:12
11.	"Apopse Se Thelo [Remix]" (Απόψε Σε Θέλω; Tonight, I Want You)	Lefteris Papadopoulos	Positive Energy	3:18
12.	"Blue Jean"	Natalia Germanou	Alexandros Vourazelis	4:38
Total length:				51:37

== Singles ==
The following singles were officially released to radio stations and made into music videos. The songs "Me Sighoris", "I Gineka Tis Zois Sou" and "Blue Jean", despite not having been released as singles, managed to gain radio airplay with the following singles.

"S' Agapo"

"S' Agapo" was the lead single from the album and released in June 2002 with music video, directed by Kostas Kapetanidis. The song is a pop dance and gained massive radio airplay.

"Giro Mou"

"Giro Mou" was the second single from the album and released in October 2002 with music video, directed by Kostas Kapetanidis. The song is a laiko balad and had a good airplay after the last hit.

== Credits ==
=== Personnel ===
- Fotis Anagnostou – bass (tracks: 7)
- Giannis Bithikotsis – bouzouki (tracks: 3, 8, 9) / cura (tracks: 2, 3, 8) / baglama (tracks: 3, 8)
- Giorgos Chatzopoulos – guitars (tracks: 2, 3, 4, 5, 8, 9, 12)
- Pavlos Diamantopoulos – bass (tracks: 2, 3, 4, 8, 9)
- Spiros Dimitropoulos – guitars (tracks: 7)
- Vasilis Iliadis – säz (tracks: 6)
- Katerina Kiriakou – backing vocals (tracks: 2, 3, 4, 5, 6, 10, 12)
- Fedon Lionoudakis – accordion (tracks: 2, 3, 8)
- Andreas Mouzakis – drums (tracks: 2, 3, 4, 8, 9)
- Dimitris Paizis – programming, keyboards (tracks: 7, 11)
- Alex Panagi – backing vocals (tracks: 2, 3, 4, 5, 6, 10, 12) / second vocal (tracks: 9)
- Positive Energy – orchestration (tracks: 7, 11)
- Giorgos Roilos – percussion (tracks: 2, 3, 4, 8)
- Vasilis Rousis – drums (tracks: 7)
- Sokratis Soumelas – orchestration (tracks: 4)
- Thanasis Vasilopoulos – clarinet (tracks: 2, 5) / ney (tracks: 2)
- Alexandros Vourazelis – orchestration (tracks: 1, 2, 3, 5, 6, 8, 9, 10, 12) / programming, keyboards (tracks: 1, 2, 3, 4, 5, 6, 8, 9, 10, 12)
- Martha Zioga – backing vocals (tracks: 2, 3, 4, 5, 6, 10, 12)

=== Production ===
- Christos Chatzistamou – mastering
- Dimitris Chorianopoulos – mix engineer, editing
- Sotiris Egkolfopoulos – sound engineer
- Panos Kallitsis – hair styling, make up
- Giorgos Segredakis – styling
- Sokratis Soumelas – executive producer
- Dimitris Stamatiou – sound engineer
- Katerina Tsatsani – photographer

== Charts ==
I Gineka Tis Zois Mou made its debut at number 43 on the 'Top 50 Greek Albums' charts by IFPI.

After months, it was certified gold according to sales.

Chart	Provider	Peak position	Certification
Top 50 Greek Albums	IFPI	43	Gold
