= Vale Fantasia =

Vale Fantasia Βάλε Φαντασία

Studio album by Mariada Pieridi
- Released: 9 October 2003
- Recorded: Workshop Studio
- Genre: Pop, Dance, Modern laika
- Length: 1:02:26
- Language: Greek
- Label: Universal Music Greece; Polydor
- Producer: Alexandros Vourazelis

Mariada Pieridi chronology
I Gineka Tis Zois Sou (2002)	Vale Fantasia; Βάλε Φαντασία (2003)	Abra Katabra (2004)

Singles from Vale Fantasia
- 1. "Meine Dipla Mou" Released: 23 May 2003; 2. "Oute Ki Esi" Released: 30 June 2003; 3. "Rotisa" Released: 28 July 2003; 4. "Vale Fantasia" Released: 10 October 2003; 5. "Ena" Released: 15 December 2004; 6. "Aplose Ta Heria Sou" Released: 17 February 2004

Vale Fantasia (Greek: Βάλε Φαντασία; English: Show Imagination) is the second studio album of Greek singer Marianta Pieridi. It was released on 9 October 2003 by Universal Music Greece and certified gold, selling 30,000 units in Greece. The album composed by Alexandros Vourazelis and it is her most popular and successful album.

== Track listing ==
All music is composed by Alexandros Vourazelis.

No.	Title	Lyrics	Length
1.	"Ena" (Ένα; One)	Nikos Sarris	4:49
2.	"Aplose Ta Heria Sou" (Άπλωσε Τα Χέρια Σου; Reach Out Your Hands)	Kosmas	4:43
3.	"Pou Pas" (Που Πας; Where Are You Going)	Kosmas	4:23
4.	"Vale Fantasia" (Βάλε Φαντασία; Show Imagination)	Vaggelis Konstantinidis	4:18
5.	"Rotisa" (Ρώτησα; I Asked)	Vaggelis Konstantinids	4:02
6.	"Lathos Himeia" (Λάθος Χημεία; Wrong Chemistry)	Nikos Sarris	4:11
7.	"Signomi Pou S' Agapisa" (Συγνώμη Που Σ' Αγάπησα; I'm Sorry That I Loved You)	Nikos Sarris	4:41
8.	"Iparhoun Κati Αntres" (Υπάρχουν Κάτι Άντρες; There Are Some Men)	Vaggelis Konstantinidis	3:50
9.	"I Kardia" (Η Καρδιά; The Heart)	Kosmas	4:27
10.	"Meine Dipla Mou" (Μείνε Δίπλα Μου; Stay By My Side)	Vaggelis Konstantinidis	4:38
11.	"Apopse Thelo Na Se Do" (Απόψε Θέλω Να Σε Δω; I Wanna See You Tonight)	Konstantinos Gkavelas	4:34
12.	"Katallili Stigmi" (Κατάλληλη Στιγμή; Right Moment)	Natalia Germanou	4:47
13.	"Viasou" (Βιάσου; Hurry Up)	Vaggelis Konstantinidis	4:24
14.	"Oute Ki Esi" (Ούτε Κι Εσύ; Neither You)	Natalia Germanou	4:39
Total length:			1:02:26

== Singles ==
The following singles were officially released to radio stations, three of them with music videos. The songs "Pou Pas", "Lathos Himeia" and "Iparhoun Kati Antres" did not release as singles, but gained radio airplay.

1. "Meine Dipla Mou" (Stay By My Side)
2. "Oute Ki Esi" (Neither You)
3. "Rotisa" (I Asked)
4. "Vale Fantasia" (Show Imagination)
5. "Ena" (One)
6. "Aplose Ta Heria Sou" (Reach Out Your Hands)

== Credits ==
Credits adapted by liner notes.

=== Personnel ===
- Giannis Bithikotsis – bouzouki, baglama (3, 5, 9, 11) • cura (3, 5, 7, 9, 11)
- Savvas Christodoulou – guitars (2, 7, 8, 9)
- Pavlos Diamantopoulos – bass (7, 8, 9)
- Vasilis Eliadis – säz (6, 8, 10) • cümbüş (10)
- Giorgos Hatzopoulos – guitars (3, 4, 5, 10, 11, 13, 14)
- Katerina Kiriakou – backing vocals (4, 5, 6, 7, 8, 9, 10, 11, 13, 14)
- Kostas Liolios – drums (3, 5, 13)
- Phedon Lionoudakis – accordion (5, 10)
- Andreas Mouzakis – drums (7, 8, 9)
- Alex Panayi – backing vocals (4, 5, 6, 7, 8, 9, 10, 11, 13, 14)
- Thanasis Vasilopoulos – clarinet, ney (7, 8)
- Alexandros Vourazelis – orchestration, programming, keyboards

=== Production ===
- Thodoris Chrisanthopoulos – manufacturing
- Al Giga – styling
- Christos Hatzistamou – mastering
- Dimitris Horianopoulos – mixing
- Giorgos Kalfamanolis – photographer
- Panos Kallitsis – hair styling, make up
- Dimitris Panagiotakopoulos – art direction
- Thanasis Pashalis – sound engineer
- Alexandros Vourazelis – production manager

== Charts ==
Vale Fantasia made its debut at number 9 on the 'Top 50 Greek Albums' charts by IFPI.

After months, it was certified gold according to sales.

Chart	Provider	Peak position	Certification
Top 50 Greek Albums	IFPI	9	Gold
