= Virus Music =

Record label imprint

- Parent company: Modern Times S.A.
- Founded: 2004
- Defunct: 2011 (est.)
- Distributor(s): Legend Recordings S.A
- Country of origin: Greece
- Location: Athens, Greece

Virus Music, founded in 2004, was a record label imprint of the independent Greek record company Legend Recordings S.A.

Upon launch, the label was headed by former Minos EMI managing director Miltos Karadsas and based in Athens, Greece. He allowed the label to effectively compete with the multinationals and their growing dominance in the Greek market, similar to how he had helped foster the former independent Greek record company Nitro Music. The label focused on artist development, signing new and young artists of the time such as Apostolia Zoi and Annet Artani. While the label imprint was new in the Greek music industry, its parent Legend Recordings had been a prominent independent Greek label in all genres since 1994. Legend Recordings S.A. was owned by Modern Times "Μοντέρνοι Καιροί" (not to be confused with the multinational Swedish media conglomerate of the same name), one of the largest media companies in Greece at the time. In 2011, the arrest and conviction of Modern Times' owner Kostas Giannikos on charges of embezzlement led to the label's eventual closing.
