= Iakovidis (surname) =

Iakovidis is a surname. Notable people with the surname include:

- Agathonas Iakovidis (1955–2020), Greek singer
- Georgios Iakovidis (1853–1932), Greek painter
- Petros Iakovidis, Greek singer
- Theodoros Iakovidis (born 1991), Greek weightlifter
- Filippos Iakovidis (born 1998), Cypriot swimmer

== See also ==
- Iakovidis Diakoumakos
- Petros Iakovidis (album)
