= Konstantinos Argiros discography =

- Studio albums: 8
- Singles: 22

This page is the discography of the Greek singer Konstantinos Argyros.

It consists of eight studio albums and twenty-two singles, including "Ximeromata", which is one of the most viewed Greek songs on YouTube.

== Studio albums ==
Title	Details	Peak chart positions	
Title	Details	GRE	US World
Mallon Kati Xero	Released: 20 May 2011 (Greece); Format: CD, digital download; Label: Cobalt Music	—	—
Paidi Gennaio	Released: November 2012; Format: CD, digital download; Label: Cobalt Music	—	—
Defteri Fora	Released: 14 April 2014 (Greece); Format: CD, digital download; Label: Cobalt Music	—	—
Osa Niotho	Released: 20 May 2016 (Greece); Format: CD, digital download, streaming; Label: Cobalt Music	1	—
Filise Me	Released: 1 April 2018 (Greece); Format: CD, digital download, streaming; Label: Cobalt Music	—	—
To Kati Parapano	Released: 2 October 2018 (Greece); Format: CD, digital download, streaming; Label: Panik Platinum	1	—
22	Released: 1 May 2022; Format: CD, digital download, streaming; Label: Panik Platinum	—	—
Kabanes	Released: 26 June 2026; Format: CD, digital download, streaming; Label: Pedagon, 10K Projects, Warner	—	12
"—" denotes an album that did not chart or was not released in that territory.

== Extended plays ==
Title	Details
Ola Tha Allaxoun	Release: 2008; Label: Columbia Records; Features 4 tracks (Se Xero Kala, Ola Tha Allaxoun (Tora to Xero), Skotose Me & Apologisou)

== Singles ==
Year	Title	Peak chart positions	Album
Year	Title	GRE	Album
2010	"Erotevmenos Kai Trelos"	—	Mallon Kati Xero
2010	"Eisai Oti Na'nai"	—	Mallon Kati Xero
2012	"Paidi Gennaio"	2	Paidi Gennaio
2012	"Pote Xana"	8	Paidi Gennaio
2013	"Na Tis Peis"	5	Defteri Fora
2013	"Mikros Christos (What Child Is This?)"	—	Defteri Fora
2014	"Defteri Fora"	6	Defteri Fora
2015	"To Taxidi Ksekinaei"	—	Osa Niotho
2015	"To Syberasma"	1	Osa Niotho
2015	"Ki As Ponao"	45	Osa Niotho
2016	"Ta Kataferes"	5	Osa Niotho
2016	"Athina - Thessaloniki"	6	Osa Niotho
2016	"Osa Niotho"	3	Osa Niotho
2016	"Sti Diki Mou Agkalia"	3	Osa Niotho
2017	"Ximeromata"	1	To Kati Parapano
2017	"Psemata"	1	To Kati Parapano
2017	"Se Xero Kala"	—	To Kati Parapano
2018	"Lathos Mou" (with Natassa Theodoridou)	25	To Kati Parapano
2018	"Den Eho Polla"	62	To Kati Parapano
2018	"Lioma"	1	To Kati Parapano
2018	"S' Eho Kseperasei"	7	To Kati Parapano
2019	"Ti Na To Kano"	1	To Kati Parapano
"—" denotes a single that did not chart or was not released in that territory.
