= Nikos Vertis discography =

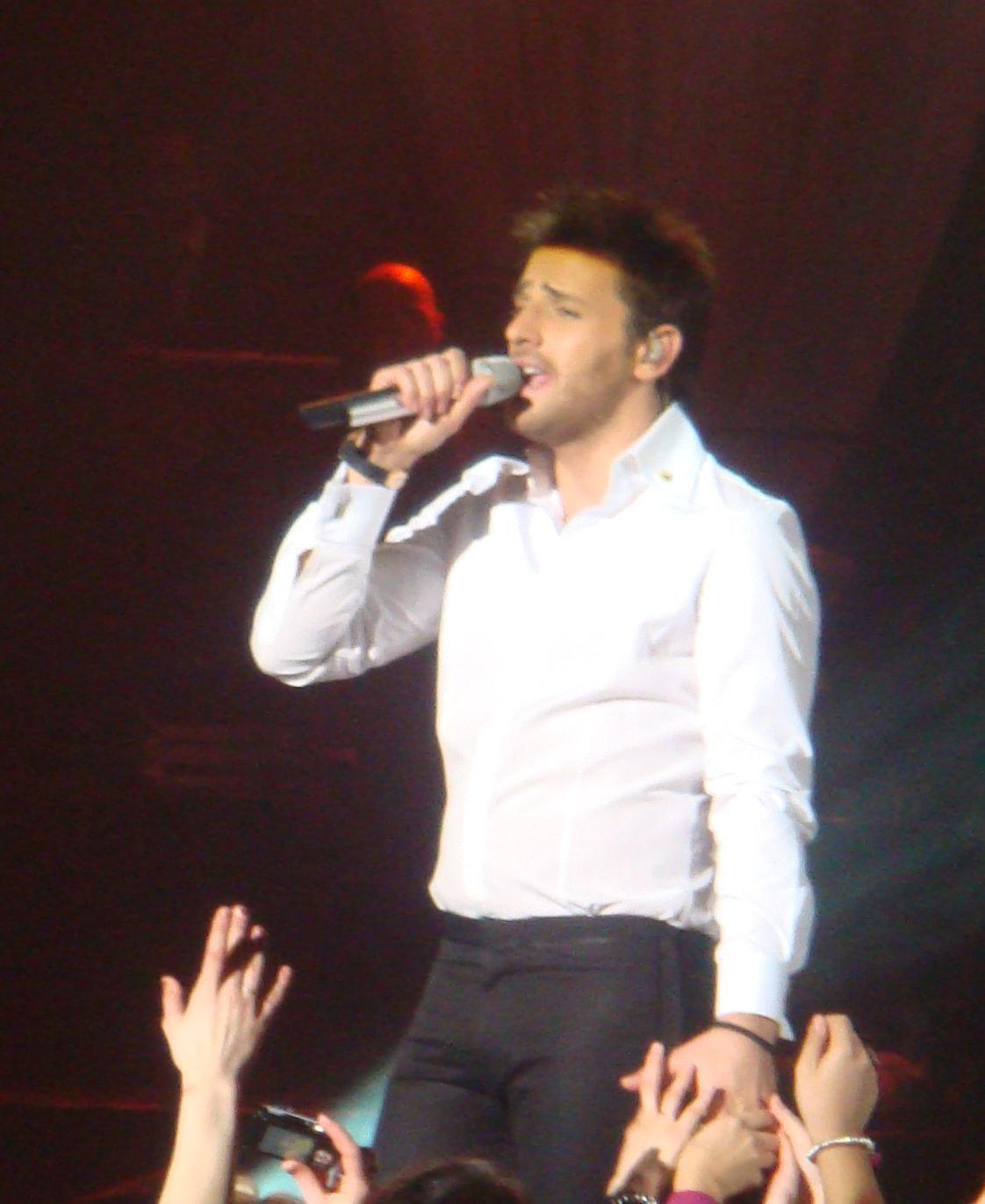
- Studio albums: 10
- Singles: 25

This page is the discography of the Dutch-born Greek singer Nikos Vertis.

It consists of ten studio albums and twenty-five singles, including "Thelo Na Me Nioseis" which, as of 19 June 2025, has more than 240 million views on YouTube and was the first Greek song that has got more than 100 million views on YouTube.

== Discography ==
=== Studio albums ===
Title	Album details	Peak chart positions	Certification
Title	Album details	GRE	Certification
Poli Apotoma Vradiazei	Released: 2003; Format: CD, CD/DVD, digital download; Label: Polydor	1	Platinum
Pame Psichi Mou	Released: 2004; Format: CD, CD/DVD, digital download; Label: Mercury Records	1	Platinum
Pos Perno Ta Vradia Monos	Released: 2005; Format: CD, CD/DVD, digital download; Label: Mercury Records	1	Platinum
Mono Gia Sena	Released: 2007; Format: CD, CD/DVD, digital download; Label: Mercury Records	1	2× Platinum
Ola Einai Edo	Released: 2009; Format: CD, digital download; Label: Universal Music	1	3× Platinum
Eimai Mazi Sou	Released: 2011; Format: CD, digital download; Label: Universal Music	1	Platinum
Protaseis	Released: 2013; Format: CD, digital download; Label: Cobalt Music	—	
Nikos Vertis Live Tour – 10 Chronia	Released: October 2014; Format: CD, DVD, digital download; Label: Cobalt Music	—	
Nikos Vertis	Released: 23 November 2015 (Greece); Format: CD, digital download; Label: Heaven Music	—	
Erotevmenos	Released: 2017; Format: CD, digital download; Label: Heaven Music	—	

=== Compilation albums ===
Title	Details
Oi Megaliteres Epitihies	Released: 2008; Label: Polydor, Universal Music; Format: Digital download, CD, S/Edition, CD/DVD
Ta 4 Afthentika Album	Released: 2009; Label: Universal Music; Format: Digital download, CD
Megala Logia: 20 Tragoudia Gia Ton Erota	Released: 2016; Label: Cobalt Music; Format: Digital download, CD

=== Singles ===
Year	Title	Peak chart positions	Album
Year	Title	GRE	Album
2002	"Asteri Mou/Poli Apotoma Vradiazei"	1	Poli Apotoma Vradiazei
2005	"Pes To Mou Xana"	1	Pos Perno Ta Vradia Monos
2007	"Mono Gia Sena"	1	Mono Gia Sena
2008	"Oneiro Alithino"	1	Ola Einai Edo
2009	"Prodosia Stin Agapi"	—	Ola Einai Edo
2009	"Ola Einai Edo"	1	Ola Einai Edo
2009	"Varethika"	—	Ola Einai Edo
2009	"Den Teliosame"	—	Ola Einai Edo
2009	"Fevgo"	—	Non-album single
2010	"Ena Filo Mou Kalo Tha Vrw" (with Natassa Theodoridou)	—	I Zoi Mou Erotas (Natassa Theodoridou)
2011	"Emeis Oi Dyo Teriazoume" (with Sarit Hadad)	—	Eimai Mazi Sou
2011	"Eimai Mazi Sou"	5	Eimai Mazi Sou
2011	"An Eisai Ena Asteri"	1	Eimai Mazi Sou
2011	"Thimose Apopse i Kardia"	—	Eimai Mazi Sou
2012	"Ela"	—	Protaseis
2014	"Thelo Na Me Nioseis"	1	Nikos Vertis Live Tour – 10 Chronia
2014	"Ena Psema"	1	Nikos Vertis Live Tour – 10 Chronia
2014	"Den Paei Na Leei"	4	Nikos Vertis Live Tour – 10 Chronia
2015	"Oneiro"	1	Nikos Vertis
2015	"Konta Sou"	5	Nikos Vertis
2015	"Tha Metaniosis"	9	Nikos Vertis
2015	"Min Argis"	7	Nikos Vertis
2017	"Erotevmenos"	4	Erotevmenos
2017	"An M'gapises"	7	Erotevmenos
2017	"Fige"	3	Erotevmenos
2018	"Prosehe Kala"	—	Erotevmenos
2019	"Allaxa"	—	
2020	"Si on n'aime qu'une fois / Η Λέξη Σ’ Αγαπώ (with Amir)"	4	
