= Dipla Se Sena =

Greatest hits album by Natassa Theodoridou
- Released: December 2008
- Genre: Modern Laika
- Length: 2:33:22
- Label: Sony BMG Greece/Columbia

Natassa Theodoridou chronology
Natasa (2007)	Dipla Se Sena (2008)	Mia Kokkini Grammi (2009)

Singles from Dipla Se Sena
- 1. "Dipla Se Sena" Released: December 2008

Dipla Se Sena (close to you) is the first greatest hits album by popular Greek artist Natassa Theodoridou. It was released in December 2008 by Sony BMG Greece. The three disc album includes three new songs composed by Giorgos Theofanous that showed in her album Mia Kokkini Grammi, 37 hit singles and a DVD containing 20 music videos.

== Track listing ==
=== Disc 1 ===
1. "Dipla Se Sena" (close to you)
2. "Apantise Mou" (Answer me)
3. "Oneiro" (dream)
4. "Den S'adiko"
5. "Enteka Para"
6. "Mia Glikeia Melodia"
7. "Axaristi Kardia"
8. "De Se Noiazei Gia Mas"
9. "Fengari"
10. "Dihos Logo Kai Aformi"
11. "Ti Ftaio"
12. "Sou Vazo Diskola"
13. "Na Grapseis Lathos (Hielo y fuego)"
14. "An Iparhi Paradeisos"
15. "Den Thelo Tetoious Filous" (ft Paschalis Terzis)
16. "Tis Diskoles Stigmes"
17. "Na M'agapas"
18. "Na 'soun Thalassa" (ft Sarbel)
19. "Telika Den Aksizeis"
20. "Ela Pou Fovame"

=== Disc 2 ===
1. "Den Epitrepete"
2. "Min Giriseis Ksana (Amulet)" (ft Triantafillos)
3. "Epitelous" (ft Katy Garbi)
4. "Ena Spiti Kaigetai (Krima)"
5. "Pou Perpatas (Tellement N' Brick)"
6. "Den Ksero Poso S'agapo"
7. "De Se kseperasa" (ft Yiannis Parios)
8. "Eho Mia Agkalia"
9. "Paranomi Agapi" (ft Christos Pazis)
10. "Skoupidiariko"
11. "Katazitite (Ojos asi)"
12. "Kalinikta S'agapo"
13. "Den Thelo Tipota"
14. "Opou Kai Na Sai"
15. "Sygnomi Ftaio"
16. "Kane Ena Taxidi Mesa Sta Matia Sou"
17. "Girna"
18. "Tha Orkisto Se O,ti Eho Iero" (ft Bo)
19. "Ksimeronomai"
20. "Pali"

=== DVD ===
1. "Fengari"
2. "Pali"
3. "Den S'adiko"
4. "Katazititai (Ojos asi)"
5. "Aharisti Kardia"
6. "Mia Glikeia Melodia"
7. "Sou Vazo Diskola"
8. "Pou Perpatas"
9. "Na Grapseis Lathos (Hielo y fuego)"
10. "Eho Mia Agkalia"
11. "Ah!"
12. "Ena Spiti Kaigetai (Krima)"
13. "Tis Diskoles Stigmes"
14. "Den Thelo Tipota"
15. "Opou Kai Na Sai"
16. "Diplo Paignidi"
17. "Ipokrisia"
18. "Den Ksero Poso S'agapo"
19. "Ksimeronomai"
20. "Ela Pou Fovamai - Kamia Fora"

== Single ==
"Dipla Se Sena"

"Dipla Se Sena" is the first single and title track of the album. The song gained strong airplay and made it into the Nielsen Greece Top 20 Chart. The music video is directed by Manolis Tsirakis.

== Chart performance ==
The album debuted on the Greek Albums Chart at number two and has charted for a total of 15 weeks as of the week 11/2009 charts. It also peaked on the Cypriot Albums Chart at number six.

Chart	Providers	Peak position	Certification
Greek Albums Chart	IFPI	2	Platinum
Cypriot Albums Chart	Musical Paradise Top 10	1	-
