= Ip'Efthini Mou =

Ip' Efthini Mou Υπ' Ευθύνη Μου

Studio album by Natasa Theodoridou
- Released: 6 July 2001
- Recorded: Argiriou Recordings studio
- Genre: Contemporary laika
- Length: 1:04:24
- Labels: Sony Music Greece; Columbia
- Producer: Giannis Doulamis

Natasa Theodoridou chronology
Tha Miliso Me T'Asteria (2000)	Ip' Efthini Mou; Υπ' Ευθύνη Μου (2001)	Tosi Agapi Pos Na Hathei (2002)

Singles from Ip' Efthini Mou
- 1. "Kataziteitai" Released: June 2001; 2. "Sou Vazo Diskola" Released: August 2001; 3. "Ti Ftaio" Released: October 2001; 4. "Ipokrisia" Released: December 2001

Ip' Efthini Mou (Greek: Υπ' Ευθύνη Μου; English: Under My Responsibility) is the fourth album by Greek singer Natasa Theodoridou. It was released on 6 July 2001 by Sony Music Greece and received gold certification, selling 40,000 units. The album was written by several artists, including also Triantaphillos, Natalia Germanou and Eleni Giannatsoulia, and contains her top hit "Kataziteitai" which is a cover of Ojos Así, previously performed by Shakira.

== Tracklist ==
No.	Title	Lyrics	Music	Length
1.	"Kataziteitai" (Καταζητείται; Wanted)	Eleni Giannatsoulia	Javier Garza; Pablo Flores; Shakira Isabel; Mebarak Ripoll	4:06
2.	"Ipokrisia" (Υποκρισία; Hypocrisy)	Tasos Vougiatzis	Solon Apostolakis	4:09
3.	"Sou Vazo Diskola" (Σου Βάζω Δύσκολα; I Make It Difficult For You)	Ilias Philippou	Tasos Panayis	3:52
4.	"Ego De Thelo Kai Poli" (Εγώ Δε Θέλω Και Πολύ; I Don't Want Too Much)	Eleni Giannatsoulia	Konstantinos Pantzis	4:01
5.	"Ti Ftaio" (Τι Φταίω; What Is My Fault)	Ilias Philippou	Tasos Panayis	3:25
6.	"Monopoleis" (Μονοπωλείς; You Monopolize)	Christophoros Zisoulis	Christophoros Zisoulis	3:45
7.	"Tora To Thimithikes" (Τώρα Το Θυμήθηκες; Now You Remembered)	Natalia Germanou	Akis Diximos	3:47
8.	"Dorean" (Δωρεάν; Free)	Tasos Vougiatzis	Solon Apostolakis	3:48
9.	"Teleftaia Mou Agapi" (Τελευταία Μου Αγάπη; My Last Love)	Eleni Giannatsoulia	Akis Diximos	3:56
10.	"Eisai Sinitheia Kakia" (Είσαι Συνήθεια Κακιά; You're A Bad Habit)	Fotini Dourou	Mihalis Touratzidis	3:27
11.	"Apotipoma" (Αποτύπωμα; Imprint)	Nikos Gritsis	Takis Bougas	3:19
12.	"Na Giriseis" (Να Γυρίσεις; Come Back)	Triantaphillos	Triantaphillos	3:38
13.	"Oso Kai Na S' Agapao (Ip' Efthini Mou)" (Όσο Και Να Σ' Αγαπάω (Υπ' Ευθύνη Μου); As Much As I Love You (Under My Responsibility))	Nikos Gritsis	Takis Bougas	3:44
14.	"Enthimia" (Ενθύμια; Souvenirs)	Ilias Philippou	Tasos Panayis	3:22
15.	"Mia Fora Ki Esi Kane Kati (ft. Kostas Doxas)" (Μια Φορά Κι Εσύ Κάνε Κάτι; Once Doing Something)	Triantaphillos	Triantaphillos	3:58
16.	"Kalos Irthes, Agapi" (Καλώς Ήρθες, Αγάπη; Welcome, Love)	Kostas Logothetidis; Grigoris Milonas	Nikos Kallinis; Kostas Logothetidis	4:21
17.	"Adiexodi Agapi" (Αδιέξοδη Αγάπη; Impasse Love)	Ilias Filippou	Kyriakos Papadopoulos	3:46
Total length:				1:04:24

== Singles ==
Four songs becoming official singles to radio stations with music videos and gained airplay.

- "Kataziteitai" (Wanted)
- "Sou Vazo Diskola" (I Make It Difficult For You)
- "Ti Ftaio" (What Is My Fault)
- "Ipokrisia" (Hypocrisy)
- "Kalos Irthes Agapi" (Welcome, My Love)

== Credits ==
Credits adapted from liner notes.

=== Personnel ===
- Giannis Bithikotsis – bouzouki (3, 4, 5, 6, 10, 12, 14) / cura (3, 4, 9, 14, 17) / baglama (3, 5, 9, 10, 12, 14)
- Vasilis Diamantis – soprano saxophone (17)
- Akis Diximos – second vocal (1, 3, 5, 9, 10, 12)
- Vasilis Gkinos – orchestration, programming (2, 16)
- Thanos Gkiouletzis – violin (5, 7)
- Antonis Gounaris – orchestration, programming, guitar (1, 3, 4, 5, 6, 7, 9, 10, 11, 12, 13, 14, 15, 17) / cura (8, 11, 13) / cümbüş (8, 13) / oud (1)
- Anna Ioannidou – backing vocals (1, 2, 4, 6, 8, 11, 13, 14, 16)
- Katerina Kiriakou – backing vocals (1, 2, 4, 6, 8, 11, 13, 14, 16)
- Antonis Koulouris – drums (3, 5, 10, 12, 14)

=== Production ===
- Takis Argiriou – sound engineer, mix engineer
- Vasilis Bouloubasis – hair styling
- Thodoris Chrisanthopoulos (Fabelsound) – mastering
- Ntinos Diamantopoulos – photographer
- Giannis Doulamis – production manager
- Iakovos Kalaitzakis – make up
- Dimitris Rekouniotis – artwork
- George Segredakis – styling
- Katerina Sideridou – cover processing
