= Tha Miliso Me T'Asteria =

Tha Miliso Me T' Asteria Θα Μιλήσω Με Τ' Αστέρια

Studio album by Natasa Theodoridou
- Released: 17 March 2000
- Recorded: Argiriou Recordings studio Sofita studio
- Genre: Contemporary Laika
- Length: 55:18
- Label: Sony Music Greece; Columbia
- Producer: Giannis Doulamis

Natasa Theodoridou chronology
Defteri Agapi (1998)	Tha Miliso Me T' Asteria; Θα Μιλήσω Με Τ' Αστέρια (2000)	Ip'Efthini Mou (2001)

Singles from Tha Miliso Me T' Asteria
- 1. "Na Grapseis Lathos" Released: March 2000; 2. "Akouste Ti Mou Eipane" Released: May 2000; 3. "Proti Fora Tha Kano Kati Sosto" Released: July 2000; 4. "Diplo Paihnidi" Released: September 2000; 5. "An Iparhei Paradeisos" Released: November 2000

Tha Miliso Me T' Asteria (Greek: Θα Μιλήσω Με Τ' Αστέρια; English: I'll Talk To The Stars) is the third album by Greek singer Natasa Theodoridou. It was released on 17 March 2000 by Sony Music Greece and received platinum certification in Greece, selling 50,000 units. The album was written by several artists and frequent partners of Theodoridou, including Triantaphillos, Natalia Germanou and Eleni Giannatsoulia, and contains five singles, including some of timeless hits "Na Grapseis Lathos", "An Iparhei Paradeisos", "Diplo Paihnidi" and "Proti Fora Tha Kano Kati Sosto".

== Tracklist ==
No.	Title	Lyrics	Music	Length
1.	"Na Grapseis Lathos (Hielo Y Fuego)" (Να Γράψεις Λάθος; Write Wrong)	Eleni Giannatsoulia	Kike Santander	3:21
2.	"Akouste Ti Mou Eipane" (Ακούστε Τι Μου Είπανε; Listen To What They Told Me)	Evi Droutsa	George Kafetzopoulos	4:08
3.	"Fersou San Antras" (Φέρσου Σαν Άντρας; Be A Man)	Yiannis Liontos	Akis Diximos	3:02
4.	"Pes Mou Ti Sou Eftaixa" (Πες Μου Τι Σου Έφταιξα; Tell Me What I've Done To You)	Evi Droutsa	Konstantinos Pantzis	3:30
5.	"An Iparhei Paradeisos" (Αν Υπάρχει Παράδεισος; If There Is Heaven)	Natalia Germanou	Akis Diximos	3:28
6.	"Diplo Paihnidi" (Διπλό Παιχνίδι; Double Game)	Roula Koromila	Nasos Galakteros	4:10
7.	"Posa Mesanihta (Esi Pou Etrehes Stin Porta Na Me Deis)" (Πόσα Μεσάνυχτα (Εσύ Που Έτρεχες Στην Πόρτα Να Με Δεις); How Many Midnight (You Who Ran To The Door To See Me))	Evi Droutsa	Konstantinos Pantzis	4:22
8.	"Proti Fora Tha Kano Kati Sosto" (Πρώτη Φορά Θα Κάνω Κάτι Σωστό; First Time I'll Do Anything Right)	Evi Droutsa	Triantaphillos	4:11
9.	"Tha Miliso Pali Me T' Asteria" (Θα Μιλήσω Πάλι Με Τ' Αστέρια; I'll Talk To The Stars Again)	Eleni Giannatsoulia	Triantaphillos	4:00
10.	"Me Tropo Adiko" (Με Τρόπο Άδικο; In An Unfair Way)	Eleni Giannatsoulia	Triantaphillos	3:30
11.	"Xero Ti Thelo" (Ξέρω Τι Θέλω; I Know What I Want)	Anna Ioannidou	Akis Diximos	3:33
12.	"Tin Mera Pou Se Gnorisa (Aftokatastrofi Mou)" (Την Μέρα Που Σε Γνώρισα (Αυτοκαταστροφή Μου); The Day I Met You (My Self-destruct))	Eleni Giannatsoulia	Triantaphillos	3:33
13.	"Kapse" (Κάψε; Burn)	Sofi Pappa	Stelios Zafiriou	4:03
14.	"To Fili Tis Zois" (Το Φιλί Της Ζωής; The Kiss Of Life)	Thodoris Makridis	Triantaphillos	3:11
15.	"Ego Na Ipohoro" (Εγώ Να Υποχωρώ; Me Retreating)	Natalia Germanou	Akis Diximos	3:16
Total length:				55:18

== Singles ==
Five songs becoming official singles to radio stations with music videos and gained airplay.

- "Na Grapseis Lathos" (Write Wrong)
- "Akouste Ti Mou Eipane" (Listen To What They Told Me)
- "Proti Fora Tha Kano Kati Sosto" (First Time I'll Do Something Right)
- "Diplo Paihnidi" (Double Game)
- "An Iparhei Paradeisos" (If There Is Heaven)

== Credits ==
Credits adapted from liner notes.

=== Personnel ===
- Hakan Bingolou – säz (2)
- Yiannis Bithikotsis – bouzouki (3, 6, 12, 13, 15) / cura (7, 8, 13, 14, 15) / baglama (3, 6, 12, 13)
- Akis Diximos – second vocal (2, 6, 8, 12, 13, 15)
- Nikos Georgountzos – keyboards (1, 2, 3, 5, 6, 8, 9, 10, 11, 12, 13, 14, 15)
- Stelios Goulielmos – backing vocals (1, 4, 7, 9, 10, 11, 13, 14)
- Antonis Gounaris – orchestration, programming (1, 2, 3, 5, 6, 8, 9, 10, 11, 12, 13, 14, 15) / guitar (1, 2, 3, 4, 5, 6, 7, 8, 9, 10, 11, 12, 14, 15) / cümbüş (4)
- Anna Ioannidou – backing vocals (1, 4, 7, 9, 10, 11, 13, 14)
- Katerina Kiriakou – backing vocals (1, 4, 7, 9, 10, 11, 13, 14)
- George Kostoglou – bass (3, 9, 12)
- Antonis Koulouris – drums (3, 6, 9, 12)
- Phedon Lionoudakis – accordion (8)
- Andreas Mouzakis – drums (1, 4, 7)
- Konstantinos Pantzis – orchestration, programming, keyboards (4, 7)
- Stavros Pazarentzis – clarinet (7) / zurna (4)
- George Roilos – percussion (4, 7)
- Nikos Sakellarakis – trumpet (1)
- Philippos Tseberoulis – saxophone (1, 5)
- Nikos Vardis – bass (4, 7)

=== Production ===
- Takis Argiriou – sound engineer, mix engineer (1, 2, 3, 5, 6, 8, 9, 10, 11, 12, 13, 14, 15)
- Vasilis Bouloubasis – hair styling
- Doukas Chatzidoukas – styling
- Thodoris Chrisanthopoulos (Fabelsound) – mastering
- Yiannis Doulamis – production manager
- Iakovos Kalaitzakis – make up
- Lefteris Neromiliotis – sound engineer, mix engineer (4, 7)
- Dimitris Rekouniotis – artwork
- Katerina Sideridou – art direction
- Konstantinos Tsiliakos – photographer
