= Defteri Agapi =

Defteri Agapi Δεύτερη Αγάπη

Studio album by Natasa Theodoridou
- Released: 18 December 1998
- Recorded: Argiriou Recordings studio
- Genre: Modern Laika
- Length: 57:10
- Label: Sony Music Greece; Columbia
- Producer: Giannis Doulamis

Natasa Theodoridou chronology
| Natasa Theodoridou (1997) | Defteri Agapi; Δεύτερη Αγάπη (1998) | Tha Miliso Me T'Asteria (2000) |

Singles from Defteri Agapi
- 1. "Pou Perpatas" Released: September 1998; 2. "Defteri Agapi" Released: December 1998; 3. "Aharisti Kardia" Released: February 1999; 4. "Peripou" Released: May 1999

Defteri Agapi (Greek: Δεύτερη Αγάπη; English: Second Love) is the second album by Greek singer Natasa Theodoridou. It was released on 18 December 1998 by Sony Music Greece and received platinum certification, selling 80,000 units. This is the Natasa's best selling album and contains some of her most successful songs, including "Pou Perpatas", "Defteri Agapi", "Aharisti Kardia" and "Peripou".

== Track listing ==
| No. | Title | Lyrics | Music | Length |
|---|---|---|---|---|
| 1. | "Pou Perpatas (Tellement N' Brick)" (Που Περπατάς; Where Are You Walk Around) | Eleni Giannatsoulia | Faudel | 3:32 |
| 2. | "Defteri Agapi" (Δεύτερη Αγάπη; Second Vocal) | Eleni Giannatsoulia | Triantaphillos | 4:00 |
| 3. | "Ipokatastato" (Υποκατάστατο; Substitute) | Ilias Filippou | Kiriakos Papadopoulos | 3:32 |
| 4. | "Aharisti Kardia" (Αχάριστη Καρδιά; Ungrateful Heart) | Eleni Giannatsoulia | Triantaphillos | 2:56 |
| 5. | "Ti Tha Haso An Se Haso" (Τι Θα Χάσω Αν Σε Χάσω; What Will I Lose If I Lose You) | Ilias Filippou | Giorgos Kafetzopoulos | 3:26 |
| 6. | "Peripou" (Περίπου; About) | Natalia Germanou | Triantaphillos | 3:05 |
| 7. | "Enteka Para" (Έντεκα Παρά; Almost Eleven O' Clock) | Eleni Giannatsoulia | Kiriakos Papadopoulos | 4:16 |
| 8. | "Sosto I Lathos" (Σωστό Ή Λάθος; Right Or Wrong) | Eleni Giannatsoulia | Giannis Bithikotsis | 3:35 |
| 9. | "Otan Mia Ginaika Thelei" (Όταν Μια Γυναίκα Θέλει; When A Woman Wants) | Eleni Giannatsoulia | Triantaphillos | 3:18 |
| 10. | "Den Thelo Tetoious Filous (ft. Paschalis Terzis)" (Δεν Θέλω Τέτοιους Φίλους; I Don't Want Those Friends) | Giannis Pilianidis | Giannis Papadopoulos | 4:25 |
| 11. | "Nihta Se Gnorisa" (Νύχτα Σε Γνώρισα; I Met You Night) | Natalia Germanou | Triantaphillos | 3:15 |
| 12. | "Kane Kati" (Κάνε Κάτι; Do Something) | Natalia Germanou | Triantaphillos | 3:47 |
| 13. | "Den Tha Meinei Tipota Orthio" (Δεν Θα Μείνει Τίποτα Όρθιο; Nothing Will Remain Standing) | Evi Droutsa | Giannis Bithikotsis | 3:36 |
| 14. | "Egklima Kardias" (Έγκλημα Καρδιάς; Heart Crime) | Ilias Filippou | Giorgos Kafetzopoulos | 3:27 |
| 15. | "Paraloga" (Παράλογα; Unreasonable) | Ilias Filippou | Giorgos Kafetzopoulos | 3:57 |
| 16. | "Ti Girevo Ego M' Aftous" (Τι Γυρεύω Εγώ Μ' Αυτούς; What Do I Want With Them) | Giannis Pilianidis | Giannis Papadopoulos | 3:03 |
| Total length: | | | | 57:10 |

== Credits ==
Credits adapted from the album's liner notes.

=== Personnel ===
- Takis Argiriou: percussion (tracks: 2)
- Romeos Avlastimidis: violin (tracks: 3)
- Hakan Bingolou: säz (tracks: 1, 15)
- Giannis Bithikotsis: baglama (tracks: 4, 8, 10, 16) || bouzouki (tracks: 4, 8, 9, 10, 13, 14, 15, 17) || cura (tracks: 3, 5, 6, 9, 10, 11, 13, 14, 16)
- Charis Chalkitis: backing vocals (tracks: 1, 3, 5, 6, 9, 11, 12, 14, 15)
- Akis Diximos: backing vocals (tracks: 1, 3, 5, 6, 9, 11, 12, 14, 15) || second vocal (tracks: 4, 8, 13, 15, 16)
- Ntinos Georgountzos: keyboards (all tracks)
- Stelios Goulielmos: backing vocals (tracks: 1, 3, 5, 6, 9, 11, 12, 14, 15)
- Antonis Gounaris: cümbüş (tracks: 2, 3, 6) || guitar, orchestration, programming (all tracks) || oud (tracks: 5)
- Anna Ioannidou: backing vocals (tracks: 1, 3, 5, 6, 9, 11, 12, 14, 15)
- Katerina Kiriakou: backing vocals (tracks: 1, 3, 5, 6, 9, 11, 12, 14, 15)
- Antonis Koulouris: drums (tracks: 2, 3, 4, 5, 7, 8, 10, 11, 13, 14, 15, 16)
- Giorgos Kostoglou: bass (tracks: 2, 3, 4, 5, 7, 8, 10, 11, 13, 14, 15, 16)
- Fedon Lionoudakis: accordion (tracks: 6, 11, 16)
- Thanasis Vasilopoulos: clarinet (tracks: 7, 14)

=== Production ===
- Takis Argiriou (Argiriou Recordings studio): mix engineer
- Thodoris Chrisanthopoulos (Fabelsound): mastering
- Dimitris Dimitroulis: make up
- Giannis Doulamis: executive producer
- Antonis Glikos: artwork
- Nicol: hair styling
- Despina Saraga: styling
- Kostas Savvidis (Argiriou Recordings studio): mix engineer, sound engineer
- Katerina Sideridou: art direction
- Tasos Vrettos: photographer
