= Natasa Theodoridou (album) =

Studio album by Natasa Theodoridou
- Released: 3 October 1997
- Recorded: 111 studio
- Genre: Modern Laika
- Length: 44:36
- Label: Sony Music Greece; Columbia
- Producer: Giannis Doulamis

Natasa Theodoridou chronology
Natasa Theodoridou (1997)	Defteri Agapi (1998)

Singles from Natasa Theodoridou
- 1. "Mi Giriseis Xana" Released: June 1997; 2. "Ena Spiti Kaigetai (Krima)" Released: July 1997; 3. "Dihos Logo Ki Aformi" Released: September 1997; 4. "Ah! Kai Na 'Tane" Released: November 1997; 5. "Den S' Adiko" Released: December 1997

Natasa Theodoridou (Greek: Νατάσα Θεοδωρίδου) is the self-titled debut album by Greek singer Natasa Theodoridou. It was released on 3 October 1997 by Sony Music Greece and received platinum certification in Greece, selling 50,000 units. A majority of songs were composed by Triantaphillos in collaboration with Phoebus. It contains seven singles, including "Dihos Logo Ki Aformi", "Ena Spiti Kaigetai", "Mi Giriseis Xana" and "Ah! Kai Na 'Tane".

== Track listing ==
No.	Title	Lyrics	Music	Length
1.	"Dihos Logo Ki Aformi" (Δίχως Λόγο Κι Αφορμή; Without Reason And Motive)	Eleni Giannatsoulia	Triantaphillos	3:03
2.	"Ena Spiti Kaigetai (Krima)" (Ένα Σπίτι Καίγεται (Κρίμα); A House Burns (Pity))	Evi Droutsa	Triantaphillos	3:01
3.	"Mi Giriseis Xana (Amulet) (ft. Triantaphillos)" (Μη Γυρίσεις Ξανά (Amulet); Don't Turn Again)	Eleni Giannatsoulia	Natacha Atlas, Count Dubulah, Hamid ManTu, Alex Kasiek	3:49
4.	"Ah! Kai Na 'Tane" (Αχ! Και Να 'Τανε; Oh! And If It Was)	Eleni Giannatsoulia	Phoebus	3:44
5.	"Ipotagi Kai Epanastasi" (Υποταγή Και Επανάσταση; Submission And Revolution)	Evi Droutsa	Triantaphillos	3:29
6.	"Se Teliki Analisi" (Σε Τελική Ανάλυση; Ultimately)	Evi Droutsa	Triantaphillos	3:22
7.	"Den S' Adiko" (Δεν Σ' Αδικώ; You Don't In Unjust)	Eleni Giannatsoulia	Giannis Bithikotsis	3:33
8.	"Girna" (Γύρνα; Come Back)	Theodoros Makridis	Theodoros Makridis	4:00
9.	"Kane Ena Taxidi Mesa Sta Matia Mou" (Κάνε Ένα Ταξίδι Μέσα Στα Μάτια Μου; Do A Trip In My Eyes)	Xenofon Theodorou	Triantaphillos; Theodoros Makridis	2:52
10.	"Isos" (Ίσως; Maybe)	Theodoros Makridis	Triantaphillos	3:09
11.	"Kane Oti Thes" (Κάνε Ότι Θες; Do Anything You Want)	Evi Droutsa	Triantaphillos	3:37
12.	"Svino Apo Ton Harti" (Σβήνω Από Τον Χάρτη; I Switching Out The Map)	Eleni Giannatsoulia	Savvas Angin	4:13
13.	"Ti Mou 'Heis Kanei" (Τι Μου 'Χεις Κάνει; What Have You Done To Me)	Theodoros Makridis	Triantaphillos	2:44
Total length:				44:36

== Credits ==
Credits adapted from the album's liner notes.

=== Personnel ===
- Hakan Bingolou: percussion (tracks: 1, 2, 3, 4, 6, 8, 10, 11, 12) || säz (tracks: 12)
- Giannis Bithikotsis: baglama (tracks: 5, 7, 9, 13) || bouzouki (tracks: 2, 5, 6, 7, 8, 9, 13) || cura (tracks: 1, 3, 4, 10) || mandolin (tracks: 11)
- Charis Chalkitis: backing vocals (tracks: 1, 2, 3, 4, 6, 7, 8, 9, 10, 12)
- Nikos Chatzopoulos: violin (tracks: 4, 8)
- Antonis Gounaris: cümbüş (tracks: 2, 3, 10) || guitar, orchestration, programming (all tracks)
- Paola Komini: backing vocals (tracks: 1, 2, 3, 4, 6, 7, 8, 9, 10, 12)
- Fedon Lionoudakis: accordion (tracks: 1, 6, 9)
- Elena Patroklou: backing vocals (tracks: 1, 2, 3, 4, 6, 7, 8, 9, 10, 12)
- Thanasis Vasilopoulos: clarinet (tracks: 11) || ney (tracks: 12)

=== Production ===
- Takis Argiriou (111 studio): mix engineer, sound engineer
- Giannis Doulamis: executive producer
- Antonis Glikos: artwork
- Giannis Ioannidis (D.P.H.): mastering
- Dimitris Kilalous: photographer
