= Sou Ta 'Dosa Ola =

Sou Ta 'Dosa Ola Σου Τα 'Δωσα Όλα

Studio album by Petros Iakovidis
- Released: 28 December 2018
- Studio: Bi-Kay Studio
- Genre: Pop, Modern laika
- Length: 29:45
- Language: Greek
- Label: Minos EMI
- Producer: Spyros Potamopoulos

Petros Iakovidis chronology
| Apotipomata (2017) | Sou Ta 'Dosa Ola; Σου Τα 'Δωσα Όλα (2018) | Odos Tsimiski (2022) |

Singles from Sou Ta 'Dosa Ola
- 1. "Gela Mou" Released: 09 March 2018; 2. "Min Tolmiseis" Released: 03 September 2018; 3. "Vradia Aximerota" Released: 17 December 2018; 4. "Paraferesai" Released: 20 February 2019; 5. "Sou Ta 'Dosa Ola" Released: 22 May 2019

Sou Ta 'Dosa Ola (Greek: Σου Τα 'Δωσα Όλα; English: I Gave You Everything) is the second studio album by Greek singer Petros Iakovidis. The album released under the label Minos EMI and produced by Icon Music in Greece and Cyprus on 28 December 2018. The video for the title track was directed by Yiannis Papadakou and features the model Ioanna Bella.

== Track listing ==
| No. | Title | Lyrics | Music | Length |
|---|---|---|---|---|
| 1. | "Gela Mou" (Γέλα Μου; Laugh For Me) | Petros Iakovidis | Petros Iakovidis | 2:42 |
| 2. | "Min Tolmiseis" (Μην Τολμήσεις; Don't You Dare) | Petros Iakovidis | Petros Iakovidis | 3:41 |
| 3. | "Vradia Aximerota" (Βράδια Αξημέρωτα; Nights Without Dawn) | Petros Iakovidis | Petros Iakovidis | 2:45 |
| 4. | "Pou Na Eisai Tora" (Που Να Είσαι Τώρα; Where Are You Now) | Olga Vlachopoulou, Petros Iakovidis | Petros Iakovidis | 2:31 |
| 5. | "Pseftika Filia" (Ψεύτικα Φιλιά; Fake Kisses) | Petros Iakovidis | Petros Iakovidis | 3:01 |
| 6. | "Paraferesai" (Παραφέρεσαι; You Are Behaving Badly) | Petros Iakovidis | Petros Iakovidis | 2:50 |
| 7. | "Sou Ta 'Dosa Ola" (Σου Τα ΄Δωσα Όλα; I Gave You Everything) | Petros Iakovidis | Petros Iakovidis | 2:40 |
| 8. | "Apothimeno" (Απωθημένο; Suppressed Desire) | Vicky Gerothodorou | Petros Iakovidis | 3:40 |
| 9. | "S' Agapo Akoma" (Σ' Αγαπάω Ακόμα; I'm Still Loving You) | Olga Vlachopoulou | Petros Iakovidis | 3:22 |
| 10. | "Ena Fili (Featuring Natassa Theodoridou" (Ένα Φιλί; One Kiss) | Vicky Gerothodorou | Petros Iakovidis | 2:33 |
| Total length: | | | | 29:45 |

== Music videos ==
- "Gela Mou"
- "Min Tolmiseis"
- "Vradia Aximerota"
- "Sou Ta 'Dosa Ola"

== Release history ==
| Region | Date | Label | Format | Version |
|---|---|---|---|---|
| Greece | 28 December 2018 | Minos EMI | Digital download | Original release |
| Cyprus | 28 December 2018 | Minos EMI | Digital download | Original release |
| Greece | 8 February 2019 | Minos EMI | CD | Original release |
| Cyprus | 8 February 2019 | Minos EMI | CD | Original release |

== Personnel ==
- Spyros Potamopoulos – executive producer, management
- Dimitris Panagiotakopoulos – artwork
- Venetia Sapatra – background vocals
- Akis Deiximos – background vocals
- Katerina Kyriakou – background vocals
- Morfoula Iakovidou – background vocals
- Panos Vlasakoudis – keyboards
- Stefanos Papadopoulos – photography
