= Odos Tsimiski =

Odos Tsimiski Οδός Τσιμισκή

Studio album by Petros Iakovidis
- Released: June 24, 2022
- Recorded: Bi-Kay studio
- Genre: Pop, Modern laika
- Length: 51:47
- Language: Greek
- Label: Minos EMI
- Producer: Spyros Potamopoulos

Petros Iakovidis chronology
Sou Ta 'Dosa Ola (2018)	Odos Tsimiski; Οδός Τσιμισκή (2022)	Kalispera (2023)

Singles from Odos Tsimiski
- 1. "Fovame" Released: 2 July 2019; 2. "Kimisou Apopse Edo" Released: 10 January 2020; 3. "S' Agapao Sou Fonaxa" Released: 1 May 2020; 4. "Mi Thimonis" Released: 18 September 2020; 5. "Mou 'Lipses Poli" Released: 19 March 2021; 6. "Tatouaz" Released: 17 September 2021; 7. "As'to" Released: 10 December 2021; 8. "Gia Sou" Released: 7 May 2022; 9. "Odos Tsimiski" Released: 24 June 2022; 10. "Mono Esena" Released: 8 August 2022

Odos Tsimiski (Greek: Οδός Τσιμισκή; English: Tsimiski Street) is the third studio album by Greek singer Petros Iakovidis. It was released on 24 June 2022 by Minos EMI in Greece and Cyprus and reached the top position on the IFPI charts for two months. The album is a continuation of the modern laika with pop genre like previous releases four years prior and contains two duets with Josephine and Stefania.

== Track listing ==
All music is composed by Petros Iakovidis
Christos Santikai (3).

No.	Title	Lyrics	Length
1.	"Odos Tsimiski" (Οδός Τσιμισκή; Tsimiski Street)	Petros Iakovidis	3:10
2.	"Ela" (Έλα; Come On)	Vicky Gerothodorou	2:52
3.	"Mono Esena" (Μόνο Εσένα; Only You)	Grigoris Vaxavanelis	2:59
4.	"Heria Pano" (Χέρια Πάνω; Hands Up)	Petros Iakovidis; Vicky Gerothodorou	2:26
5.	"Den Ise Edo" (Δεν Είσαι Εδώ; You're Not Here)	Petros Iakovidis; Vicky Gerothodorou	3:21
6.	"Na Teliosoume" (Να Τελειώσουμε; Let's End)	Vicky Gerothodorou	3:58
7.	"Neraida Mou" (Νεράιδα Μου; My Fairy)	Vicky Gerothodorou	3:43
8.	"Gia Sou (ft. Josephine)" (Γεια Σου; Hello)	Vicky Gerothodorou	2:28
9.	"As'to" (Άσ'το; Let It Go)	Vicky Gerothodorou	2:59
10.	"Tatouaz" (Τατουάζ; Tattoo)	Petros Iakovidis	3:16
11.	"S' Agapao Sou Fonaxa" (Σ’ Αγαπάω Σου Φώναξα; I Shouted To You "I Love You")	Telemahos Sergis	3:05
12.	"Mi Thimonis" (Μη Θυμώνεις; Don't Get Mad)	Petros Iakovidis	3:00
13.	"Mou 'Lipses Poli" (Μου ‘Λειψες Πολύ; I've Missed You So Much)	Petros Iakovidis	3:09
14.	"Fovame" (Φοβάμαι; I'm Scared)	Petros Iakovidis	2:51
15.	"Kimisou Apopse Edo" (Κοιμήσου Απόψε Εδώ; Sleep Here Tonight)	Petros Iakovidis	3:58
16.	"S' Agapao Sou Fonaxa (ft. Stefania)" (Σ’ Αγαπάω Σου Φώναξα; I Shouted To You "I Love You")	Telemahos Sergis	2:34
17.	"Fovame (Live Version)"		1:58
Total length:			51:47

== Singles ==
The following singles were officially released to radio stations with music videos:

1. "Fovame"
2. "Kimisou Apopse Edo"
3. "S' Agapao Sou Fonaxa"
4. "Mi Thimonis"
5. "Mou 'Lipses Poli"
6. "Tatouaz"
7. "As'to"
8. "Gia Sou"
9. "Odos Tsimiski"

== Credits ==
Credits adapted from liner notes.

=== Personnel ===
- Stelios Biniaris – guitars (12)
- Dimitris Bournis – violin (7)
- Dimitris Chatzikidis – guitars (3, 13)
- Costas Constantinidis – percussion (1, 4)
- Panayiotis Damianidis – percussion (10, 11, 12, 13, 14, 15, 17)
- Dimitris Dekos – keyboards (1)
- Yiannis Diskos – saxophone (11)
- Nikos Gkiouletzis – violin (5, 12, 14, 15, 17)
- Charis Halamoutis – trumpet, trombone (8)
- Morfoula Iakovidou – backing vocals (1, 6, 13)
- Telis Kafkas – bass (1, 4, 6)
- Costas Karasavvidis – drums (10)
- Dimitris Katsivelos – trumpet (1, 2)
- George Klironomos – violin (13)
- Krida – backing vocals (5)
- Renato Kushi – trombone (1, 2)
- Costas Liolios – drums (1, 5, 6, 9, 12, 13, 17)
- Tasos Lyberis – drums, percussion (2)
- Apostolis Mallias – orchestration, programming, keyboards (1, 2, 4, 5, 6, 8, 9, 10, 11, 12, 13, 14, 15, 16, 17) | clarinet (1, 4, 8, 13, 14, 15) | ney (8, 13, 14, 15) | backing vocals (1, 4, 5, 8, 9, 10, 11, 13, 14)
- Elias Mantikos – kanun (14)
- Alex Mihalakis – clarinet (17)
- Costas Miliotakis – orchestration, programming, keyboards, harp (7)
- Arsenis Nasis – percussion (3)
- Stavros Papayiannakopoulos – bouzouki, baglama (12) | cura (9) | oud (9, 12, 13) | säz (9, 12)
- Antonis Papadopoulos – keyboards (4, 6, 17)
- George Paraskevas – guitars (14) | bouzouki (4, 10) | cura (9, 11)
- Lefteris Pouliou – saxophone (2, 10)
- Stefania Rizou – backing vocals (10)
- Alekos Roupas – percussion (5)
- Christos Santikai – orchestration, programming, keyboards, backing vocals (3)
- Venetia Sapatra – backing vocals (1, 2, 4)
- Nikos Stadiatis – accordion (13)
- Panayiotis Terzidis – bouzouki (10)
- Elias Tsapatsaris – bass (3)
- Spyros Vardakastanis – bass (8, 9, 10, 14, 17)
- Yiannis Vasilopoulos – clarinet (3)
- Athena Vermi – backing vocals (1, 2, 4, 5, 8, 9, 10, 11, 12, 13, 14, 15)
- George Zafiriou – bass (13)
- Tolis Zaharis – bouzouki, baglama (6)
- Phoebus Zaharopoulos – bass (5) | guitars (1, 2, 4, 5, 6, 8, 9, 10, 11, 12, 13, 14, 17)

=== Production ===
- Vaso Alexopoulou – styling
- Babis Biris – mastering (11, 14, 15)
- George Galanos – mastering (1, 2, 3, 4, 5, 6, 7, 8)
- Fotini Konstantelou – grooming
- Apostolis Mallias – engineer, mix (except 3) | mastering (9, 10, 12, 13, 16, 17)
- Dimitris Panayiotakopoulos – art direction
- Spyros Potamopoulos – production manager
- Christos Santikai – engineer, mix (3)
- Dimitris Skoulos – photographer

== Release history ==
Region	Date	Label	Format	Version
Greece	24 June 2022	Minos EMI	CD	Original release
Cyprus	24 June 2022	Minos EMI	CD	Original release
Greece	4 July 2022	Minos EMI	Digital download	Original release
Cyprus	4 July 2022	Minos EMI	Digital download	Original release

== Charts ==
Chart	Provider	Peak position	Certification
Greek Albums Chart	IFPI	1	—
