= S'Agapo =

Studio album by Natasa Theodoridou
- Released: 14 October 2013
- Genre: Laïko
- Length: 45:24
- Label: Minos EMI
- Producer: Giannis Doulamis, Antonis Vardis

Natasa Theodoridou chronology
Apenanti (2012)	S'Agapo (2013)	As' Ta Ola Ki Ela (2016)

Singles from S'Agapo
- 1. "Akoma S'agapo" Released: September 2013; 2. "Anamnisi" Released: December 2013; 3. "Ti Mou Simvainei" Released: February 2014

S'Agapo (Greek: Σ' αγαπώ, lit. 'I love you') is the thirteenth studio album by Greek singer Natasa Theodoridou, released on 14 October 2013 by Minos EMI. It peaked at number 3 on the Greek albums chart.

== Track listing ==
No.	Title	Lyrics	Music	Length
1.	"Egklovismeni (De M' agapas)" (Εγκλωβισμένη (Δε μ' αγαπάς); I'm Entrained (You don't love me))	Vasilis Giannopoulos	Antonis Vardis	3:53
2.	"Akoma S' Agapo" (Ακόμα σ'αγαπώ; I still love you)	Vasilis Giannopoulos	Antonis Vardis	3:52
3.	"An Se Haso" (Αν σε χάσω; If I lose you)	Vasilis Giannopoulos	Antonis Vardis	3:16
4.	"Dio Zoes" (Δυο ζωές; Two lives)	Vasilis Giannopoulos	Antonis Vardis	3:30
5.	"Me Fonazoun Oi Filou Treli" (Με φωνάζουν οι φίλοι τρελή; The friends call me crazy)	Vasilis Giannopoulos	Antonis Vardis	4:03
6.	"Anamnisi (Duet with Antonis Vardis)" (Ανάμνηση; Memory)	Nikos Palavitsinis	Antonis Vardis	3:44
7.	"O Horismos Sou Thanatos" (Ο χωρισμός σου θάνατος; Your separating is death)	Vasilis Giannopoulos	Antonis Vardis	3:33
8.	"Mi Me Katakrineis" (Μη με κατακρίνεις; Don't me criticize)	Vasilis Giannopoulos	Antonis Vardis	3:26
9.	"Ti Mou Simvainei" (Τι μου συμβαίνει; What is happening to me)	Vasilis Giannopoulos	Antonis Vardis	3:54
10.	"Poso Moiazoume" (Πόσο μοιάζουμε; How we're alike)	Vasilis Giannopoulos	Antonis Vardis	3:58
11.	"Poso Idia Skeftomai Ki Ego" (Πόσο ίδια σκέφτομαι κι εγώ; How I thing the same)	Vasilis Giannopoulos	Antonis Vardis	4:32
12.	"Psahnontas T' Oneiro Na Vro" (Ψάχνοντας τ' όνειρο να βρω; I'm excepting to find the dream)	Vasilis Giannopoulos	Antonis Vardis	3:43

== Chart performance ==
Chart	Peak position
Greek Albums Chart (IFPI Greece)	3

== Personnel ==
Production & technical

- Antonis Vardis – art director, executive producer
- Giannis Doulamis – art director, executive producer
- Antonis Vardis – arrangement, programming, keys
- Akis Eleftheriadis – recording engineer, mixing

Instruments

- Panagiotis Terzidis - bouzouki, mandolin, baglamas
- Stavros Pazarentsis – clarinet
- Foivos Zaharopoulos – guitar
- Romeo Avlastimidis – violin

Vocals

- Natasa Theodoridou – vocals
- Giannis Vardis – background vocals

Visuals & imagery

- Giorgos Katsanakis – photographer
- Vasilis Bouloubasis – hair stylist
- Giorgos Segredakis – wardrobe stylist, styling
- Dimitris Panagiotakopoulos – artwork
