= Apenanti =

Apenanti Απέναντι

Studio album by Natasa Theodoridou
- Released: 12 March 2012
- Recorded: Sofita studio
- Genre: Contemporary Laika
- Length: 39:52
- Label: Sony Music Greece; Columbia
- Producer: Giannis Doulamis; Giorgos Theofanous

Natasa Theodoridou chronology
I Zoi Mou Erotas (2010)	Apenanti; Απέναντι (2012)	S'Agapo (2013)

Singles from Apenanti
- 1. "Apenanti" Released: January 2012; 2. "Gia Kanena" Released: March 2012; 3. "Tha 'Rtho Na Se Do" Released: May 2013

Apenanti (Greek: Απέναντι; English: Opposite) is the 12th album by Greek singer Natasa Theodoridou. It was released on 12 March 2012 by Sony Music Greece and received platinum certification in Greece, selling 12,000 units. The album was written entirely by Giorgos Theofanous with lyrics by Thanos Papanikolaou. Singles from the album included "Apenanti", "Gia Kanena" and "Tha 'Rtho Na Se Do".

== Track listing ==
All music is composed by Giorgos Theofanous

No.	Title	Length
1.	"Apenanti" (Απέναντι; Opposite)	3:57
2.	"Gia Kanena" (Για Κανένα; For Nobody)	4:15
3.	"To Dilitirios Tis Kardias" (Το Δηλητήριο Της Καρδιάς; The Heart's Poison)	4:05
4.	"Ta Hatiria (ft. Marinella)" (Τα Χατίρια; The Sakes)	3:50
5.	"Tha 'Rtho Na Se Do" (Θα 'Ρθω Να Σε Δω; I'll Come To See You)	3:25
6.	"Tha Mporouse Na Itan Kai Agapi" (Θα Μπορούσε Να Ήταν Και Αγάπη; It Could Have Been Love)	4:47
7.	"Den S' Eho Anagki" (Δεν Σ' Έχω Ανάγκη; I Don't Need You)	3:44
8.	"Afto Pou Leei I Kardia Mou" (Αυτό Που Λέει Η Καρδιά Μου; That Which My Heart Says)	4:47
9.	"Teleftaia Lexi" (Τελευταία Λέξη; Last Word)	3:44
10.	"Agapi Einai" (Αγάπη Είναι; Love Is)	3:32
Total length:		39:52

== Credits ==
Credits adapted from liner notes.

=== Personnel ===
- Dimitris Antoniou: electric guitar (tracks: 1, 2)
- Akis Diximos: backing vocals (tracks: 3, 7, 8) || second vocal (tracks: 2, 6, 9, 10)
- Katerina Kiriakou: backing vocals (tracks: 3, 7, 8)
- Spiros Kontakis: electric guitar (tracks: 5, 6)
- Menios Pasialis: drums (tracks: 1, 2, 3, 4, 5, 6, 8, 9, 10)
- Christos Pertsinidis: acoustic guitar (tracks: 1, 2)
- Dimos Polimeris: accordion (tracks: 3, 8)
- Nikos Sakellarakis: trumpet (tracks: 10)
- Panagiotis Stergiou: baglama (tracks: 4, 8, 9) || bouzouki (tracks: 1, 2, 3, 4, 6, 8, 9) || cura (tracks: 4, 6, 8)
- Leonidas Tzitzos: orchestration, programming
- Giorgos Tzivelekis: bass (tracks: 1, 2, 3, 4, 5, 6, 8, 9, 10)
- Fivos Zacharopoulos: guitar (tracks: 3, 4, 8, 9, 10)

=== Production ===
- Vasilis Bouloubasis: hair styling
- Mirto Gkonou: art direction
- Antonis Glikos: artwork
- Thodoris Ikonomou (Sofita studio): mix engineer, sound engineer
- Giannis Ioannidis (D.P.H.): mastering
- Lefteris Neromiliotis (Sofita studio): mix engineer, sound engineer
- Roula Revi: photographer
- Giorgos Segradakis: styling
- Petros Siakavellas (D.P.H.): editing
- Roula Stamatopoulou: make up
- Giorgos Theofanous: executive producer
