= Erota, Den Ksereis N'Agapas =

Erota, Den Ksereis N'Agapas 'Ερωτα, Δεν Ξέρεις Ν' Αγαπάς

Studio album by Natasa Theodoridou
- Released: October 27, 2004
- Genre: Modern Laika
- Length: 32:25
- Label: Sony Music Greece/Columbia
- Producer: Evanthia Reboutsika

Natasa Theodoridou chronology
Mia Diadromi (2003)	Erota, Den Ksereis N'Agapas 'Ερωτα, Δεν Ξέρεις Ν' Αγαπάς (2004)	Os Ekei Pou I Kardia Bori N'Andexi (2005)

Singles from Erota, Den Ksereis N'Agapas
- 1. "Ksimeronomai" Released: September 2004; 2. "Pos Ta Kataferes" Released: November 2004

Erota, Den Ksereis N'Agapas (Greek: Έρωτα, Δεν Ξέρεις Ν' Αγαπάς; English: Love, you don't know how to love) is an album by popular Greek artist Natasa Theodoridou. It was released in 2004.

== Background ==
Released as Natasa Theodoridou's sixth studio album and the follow-up to the platinum certified Mia Diadromi, the album was written by Evanthia Reboutsika, with whom Theodoridou had recently collaborated with on the soundtrack for Politiki Kouzina (A Touch of Spice); the lyrics are by Mihalis Gkanas.

Originally scheduled for a September release, the album was delayed and finally released on October 27, 2004. It is described as being substantially different from the style of Theodoridou's first albums and is similar to the music and beat of older Greek folk music, featuring many Hasapikos and Zeibekikos.

== Promotion ==
Theodoridou appeared on the MAD TV show Live@5 on December 31, 2004 to co-host the New Year's Eve party, talk about the album and her successful career so far. She was also nominated for "Best Female Artist" at the Arion Music Awards with the album.

== Track listing ==
1. "Ksimeronomai" (I'm dawning) – 3:14
2. "Govaki Gialino" (Glass shoe) – 2:57
3. "Pos Ta Kataferes" (How do you make it?) – 3:33
4. "Erota, Den Ksereis N' Agapas" (Love, you don't know how to love) – 2:45
5. "Saloniki" (Saloniki) – 3:18
6. "Nostalgia" (Nostalgia) – 2:25
7. "Mathima Horou" (Dance lesson) – 3:20
8. "Fotia" (Fire) – 4:14
9. "Ti Sou Ho Kani" (What did I do to you?) – 3:45
10. "Mia Foni Makrini" (A distant voice) – 2:54

== Singles and music videos ==
"Ksimeronomai"

"Ksimeronomai" was released as the first single from the album.

"Pos Ta Kataferes"

"Pos Ta Kataferes" was released as the second single from the album with music by Evanthia Reboutsika and lyrics by Michalis Gkanas. A music video was created and is directed by Manolis Tzirakis.

== Charts ==
Chart	Providers	Peak position
Greek Albums Chart	IFPI	1
Cypriot Album Chart	All Records Top 20	1
