= Eho Mia Angalia =

Eho Mia Agkalia Έχω Μια Αγκαλιά

Studio album by Natasa Theodoridou
- Released: 21 December 2006
- Recorded: Sofita studio
- Genre: Modern laika
- Length: 47:29
- Label: Sony BMG Greece (Columbia)
- Producer: Giannis Doulamis

Natasa Theodoridou chronology
Os Eki Pou I Kardia Bori N' Antexi (2005)	Eho Mia Agkalia; Έχω Μια Αγκαλιά (2006)	Natasa (2007)

Singles from Eho Mia Agkalia
- 1. "Den Epitrepetai" Released: November 2006; 2. "Eho Mia Agkalia" Released: December 2006; 3. "Telika Den Axizeis" Released: April 2007

Eho Mia Agkalia (Greek: Έχω Μια Αγκαλιά; English: I have a hug) is the eighth album by Greek singer Natasa Theodoridou. It was released on 21 December 2006 by Sony BMG Greece and received gold certification, selling 20,000 units. The album was written entirely by Giorgos Moukidis.

== Track listing ==
No.	Title	Length
1.	"Mi Ti Fovasai Tin Agapi" (Μη Την Φοβάσαι; Don't Be Afraid Of Love)	4:05
2.	"Den Epitrepetai" (Δεν Επιτρέπεται; Not Allowed)	3:46
3.	"Eho Mia Agkalia" (Έχω Μια Αγκαλιά; I Have A Hug)	4:12
4.	"Hilies Kai Mia Nihtes" (Χίλιες Και Μία Νύχτες; Thousand One Nights)	4:09
5.	"Alli Mia Fora" (Άλλη Μια Φορά; One More Time)	3:17
6.	"Alla Pisteva" (Άλλα Πίστευα; I Thought Other Things)	3:34
7.	"An Ximeroso" (Οι Στάλες; If I Dawn)	3:49
8.	"Telika Den Axizeis" (Τελικά Δεν Αξίζεις; Finally, You Don't Deserve)	3:54
9.	"Den Perimeno" (Δεν Περιμένω; I Don't Wait)	3:31
10.	"Den Se Xehasa" (Η Μαίρη; I Didn't Forget You)	4:02
11.	"Ki Olo Rotao" (Κι Όλο Ρωτάω; And I Always Ask)	5:19
12.	"To Teleftaio Mou Tragoudi" (Το Τελευταίο Μου Τραγούδι; My Last Song)	3:41
Total length:		47:29

== Credits ==
=== Personnel ===
- Giorgos Moukidis: orchestration, programming

=== Production ===
- Vasilis Bouloubasis: hair styling
- Giannis Doulamis: executive producer
- Thodoris Ikonomou (Sofita studio): mix engineer, sound engineer
- Giannis Ioannidis (D.P.H.): mastering
- Iakovos Kalaitzakis: make up
- Lefteris Neromiliotis (Sofita studio): mix engineer, sound engineer
- Christos Prentoulis: photographer
- Dimitris Rekouniotis: artwork
