= Ximeromata =

Single by Konstantinos Argyros

from the album To Kati Parapano
- Released: 15 June 2017
- Recorded: 2017
- Genre: Contemporary laïkó; Pop
- Length: 3:01
- Label: Panik Platinum; Argy Productions
- Songwriter(s): Petros Iakovidis
- Producer(s): Panayiotis Brakoulias, Konstantinos Argyros

Konstantinos Argyros singles chronology
"Sti Diki Mou Agkalia" (2016)	"Ximeromata" (2017)	"Psemata" (2017)

"Ximeromata" (English: "Daybreaks") is a Greek contemporary laïko–pop song by Konstantinos Argyros. It was officially released on 15 June 2017 and peaked #1 in the Greek Airplay and Digital Singles Chart at the same month of its release. The song was written and composed by Greek singer-songwriter Petros Iakovidis. It is the first official single from his sixth Greek studio album "To Kati Parapano" which was released on October 2, 2018.

== Music video ==
The music video premiered on the official YouTube channel of Konstantinos Argiros, on June 15. The video was directed by Giannis Dimolitsas.

== Charts ==
Chart (2017)	Peak position
Greek iTunes Chart	1
Greek Airplay Chart	1
Greek Digital Singles	1

== Release history ==
Region	Date	Label	Format
Greece	15 June 2017	Panik Platinum	Digital download, streaming
