= Apotipomata =

Apotipomata Αποτυπώματα

Studio album by Petros Iakovidis
- Released: 11 June 2017
- Studio: Bi-Kay Studio
- Genre: Pop, Modern laika
- Length: 43:06
- Language: Greek
- Label: Minos EMI
- Producer: Spyros Potamopoulos

Petros Iakovidis chronology
Apotipomata; Αποτυπώματα (2017)	Sou Ta 'Dosa Ola (2018)

Singles from Apotipomata
- 1. "O Erotas Mou Gine" Released: 31 March 2015; 2. "Vale" Released: 29 January 2016; 3. "Agkalia" Released: 7 June 2016; 4. "Koritsaki Mou" Released: 10 October 2016; 5. "Katse Kala" Released: 14 March 2017; 6. "Akrovatis" Released: 16 June 2017; 7. "Apotipomata" Released: 23 October 2017

Apotipomata (Greek: Αποτυπώματα; English: Fingerprints) is the first studio album by Greek singer Petros Iakovidis. The album was released under the label Minos EMI and produced by Icon Music in Greece and Cyprus on 11 June 2017. That same year, on 22 December, the album was certified Gold for sales in Greece.

== Track listing ==
No.	Title	Lyrics	Music	Length
1.	"O Erotas Mou Gine" (Ο Έρωτάς Μου Γίνε; Become My Love)	Petros Iakovidis, Stratos Antipariotis (STAN)	Petros Iakovidis, Panagiotis Vlasakoudis, Iosif Kotsifakis, Manos Dedevesis	3:28
2.	"Vale" (Βάλε; Pour)	Petros Iakovidis, Stratos Antipariotis (STAN)	Petros Iakovidis	3:33
3.	"Agkalia" (Αγκαλιά; Hug)	Petros Iakovidis, Stratos Antipariotis (STAN)	Petros Iakovidis, Panagiotis Vlasakoudis, Iosif Kotsifakis, Manos Dedevesis, STAN	3:04
4.	"Koritsaki Mou" (Κοριτσάκι Μου; My Little Girl)	Petros Iakovidis	Petros Iakovidis, Panagiotis Vlasakoudis, Iosif Kotsifakis, Manos Dedevesis, STAN	3:10
5.	"Katse Kala" (Κάτσε Καλά; Behave Well)	Petros Iakovidis, Stratos Antipariotis (STAN)	Petros Iakovidis	2:52
6.	"Apotipomata" (Αποτυπώματα; Fingerprints)	Vicky Gerothodorou	Petros Iakovidis	3:30
7.	"Akrovatis" (Ακροβάτης; Acrobat)	Petros Iakovidis, Stratos Antipariotis (STAN)	Petros Iakovidis, Stratos Antipariotis (STAN)	3:01
8.	"Se Hreiazomai" (Σε Χρειάζομαι; I Need You)	Petros Iakovidis, Stratos Antipariotis (STAN)	Petros Iakovidis, Stratos Antipariotis (STAN)	3:08
9.	"Oneiro Kai Trela" (Όνειρο Και Τρέλα; Dream And Craziness)	Petros Iakovidis, Stratos Antipariotis (STAN)	Petros Iakovidis, Stratos Antipariotis (STAN)	3:08
10.	"Poso Mou Leipei" (Πόσο Μου Λείπει; How Much Do I Miss)	Petros Iakovidis, Stratos Antipariotis (STAN)	Petros Iakovidis, Stratos Antipariotis (STAN)	3:55
11.	"Me Ponaei" (Με Πονάει; It Hurts Me)	Petros Iakovidis, Stratos Antipariotis (STAN)	Petros Iakovidis, Stratos Antipariotis (STAN)	4:01
12.	"Otan Leipeis" (Όταν Λείπεις; When You Are Absent)	Petros Iakovidis	Petros Iakovidis, Stratos Antipariotis (STAN)	3:17
13.	"Orkisou" (Ορκίσου; Swear)	Petros Iakovidis	Petros Iakovidis	2:59
Total length:				43:06

== Music videos ==
- "O Erotas Mou Gine"
- "Vale"
- "Agkalia"
- "Koritsaki Mou"
- "Katse Kala"
- "Akrovatis"
- "Apotipomata"

== Release history ==
Region	Date	Label	Format	Version
Greece	11 June 2017	Minos EMI	CD, digital download	Original
Cyprus	11 June 2017	Minos EMI	CD, digital download	Original

== Charts ==
The album was certified on 22 December 2017.

Chart	Provider	Peak position	Certification
Greek Albums Chart	IFPI	6	Gold

== Personnel ==
- Spyros Potamopoulos – executive producer, management
- Dimitris Panagiotakopoulos – artwork
- Stratos Antipariotis (STAN) – background vocals (tracks 1 to 3 )
- Andromachi Koktsidi – background vocals (tracks 5 to 7, 10)
- Nasis Arsenis – background vocals (track 11)
- Morfoula Iakovidou – background vocals (track 3)
- Tania Karra – background vocals (track 4)
- Panagiotis Vlasakoudis – background vocals (tracks 1 to 3, 5, 6, 8 to 12)
- Stefanos Papadopoulos – photography
