= Mia Diadromi =

Live album by Natasa Theodoridou
- Released: 2003
- Genre: Modern Laika
- Label: Sony Music Greece/Columbia

Natasa Theodoridou chronology
Tosi Agapi Pos Na Hathei (2002)	Mia Diadromi (2003)	Erota, Den Ksereis N'Agapas (2004)

Mia Diadromi (A way) is an album by popular Greek artist Natasa Theodoridou, released in 2003 by Sony Music Greece. The album went gold. It is the first live album by Natasa Theodoridou and it includes recordings from her sold-out live appearances in the "Fos" music hall in Athens. This album was followed by a DVD release including the whole concert.

== Track listing ==
=== Disc 1 ===
1. "Fegari"
2. "Ah!"
3. "Den S'Adiko"
4. "Aharisti Kardia"
5. "Kindinos Thanatos"
6. "Perasmenes Mou Agapes"
7. "Svise Ti Floga"
8. "Mia Hameni Kiriaki"
9. "Nekro Mou Oniro"
10. "Den Ime Ego"
11. "An Iparhi Paradisos"
12. "Ti Fteo Ego"
13. "Sosto I Lathos"
14. "Sou Vazo Diskola"
15. "Den Ksero Poso S'Agapo"
16. "Kali Tihi"
17. "Tora Kles Giati Kles"
18. "Den Thelo Tetious Filous"
19. "Istoria Mou"
20. "Kamia Fora"
21. "Ela Pou Fovame"

=== Disc 2 ===
1. "Apopse Fila Me"
2. "To Parapono Mou"
3. "Anapse To Tsigaro"
4. "Min Perimenis Pia"
5. "Ligo Ligo Tha Me Sinithisis"
6. "Afti I Nihta Meni"
7. "Thessaloniki Mou"
8. "Zilia Mou"
9. "Katse Kala"
10. "Ki Eleges"
11. "Den Tha Ksanagapiso"
12. "Agriolouloudo"
13. "Tis Diskoles Stigmes"
14. "Endeka Para"
15. "Fovame Ta Tragoudia"
16. "Fegari (Finale)"
