= Tosi Agapi Pos Na Hathei =

Tosi Agapi Pos Na Hathei Τόση Αγάπη Πως Να Χαθεί

Studio album by Natasa Theodoridou
- Released: 14 November 2002
- Recorded: Workshop studio Odeon studio
- Genre: Modern laika
- Length: 59:30
- Label: Sony Music Greece; Columbia
- Producer: Giannis Doulamis

Natasa Theodoridou chronology
Ip'Efthini Mou (2001)	Tosi Agapi Pos Na Hathei; Τόση Αγάπη Πως Να Χαθεί (2002)	Mia Diadromi (2003)

Singles from Tosi Agapi Pos Na Hathei
- 1. "Ah!" Released: October 2002; 2. "Ela Pou... Fovamai" Released: November 2002; 3. "Opou Kai Na 'Sai" Released: December 2002; 4. "Feggari" Released: February 2003; 5. "Tis Diskoles Stigmes" Released: April 2003; 6. "Stigmi" Released: May 2003; 7. "Fige Apo Do" Released: June 2003

Tosi Agapi Pos Na Hathei (Greek: Τόση Αγάπη Πως Να Χαθεί; English: So Much Love How To Get Lost) is the fifth album by Greek singer Natasa Theodoridou. It was released on 14 November 2002 by Sony Music Greece and certified gold in a month, but after two months received platinum certification, selling 40,000 units. The album was in charts for six months and promoted seven singles and was produced and written by Cypriot songwriter Giorgos Theofanous.

== Track listing ==
All tracks are written by Giorgos Theofanous

No.	Title	Length
1.	"Opou Kai Na 'Sai" (Όπου Και Να 'Σαι; Wherever You Are)	3:57
2.	"Ah!" (Αχ!; Oh!)	4:06
3.	"Ela Pou... Fovamai" (Έλα Που... Φοβάμαι; Come On... I'm Scared)	5:20
4.	"Feggari" (Φεγγάρι; Moon)	4:49
5.	"Farmaki" (Φαρμάκι; Poison)	4:22
6.	"Tis Diskoles Stigmes" (Τις Δύσκολες Στιγμές; The Hard Times)	3:45
7.	"Skoupidiariko" (Σκουπιδιάρικο; Garbage Truck)	4:44
8.	"Stigmi" (Στιγμή; Moment)	3:41
9.	"Ti Ekanes Gia Mena" (Τι Έκανες Για Μένα; What Did You Do For Me)	4:01
10.	"Fige Apo Do" (Φύγε Από Δω; Get Out Of Here)	2:57
11.	"Logia" (Λόγια; Talk)	4:31
12.	"Evaisthiti Kardia" (Ευαίσθητη Καρδιά; Sensitive Heart)	3:19
13.	"Psemata" (Ψέματα; Lies)	3:24
14.	"Tora Vgaino" (Τώρα Βγαίνω; Now I'm Going Out)	3:25
15.	"Pote De Xereis" (Ποτέ Δε Ξέρεις; You Never Know)	3:09
Total length:		59:30

== Singles ==
Seven songs becoming singles to radio stations with music videos, except the songs "Ela Pou... Fovamai" " and "Stigmi", and gained airplay.

- "Ah!" (Oh!)
- "Ela Pou... Fovamai" (Come On... I'm Scared)
- "Opou Kai Na 'Sai" (Wherever You Are)
- "Feggari" (Moon)
- "Tis Diskoles Stigmes" (The Hard Times)
- "Stigmi" (Moment)
- "Fige Apo Do" (Get Out Of Here)

== Credits ==
Credits adapted from liner notes.

=== Personnel ===
- Yiannis Bithikotsis – bouzouki, baglama (2, 4, 7, 10, 13) / cura (2, 4, 6, 10, 12, 14, 15)
- Savvas Christodoulou – guitar (2, 3, 4, 5, 6, 7, 9, 10, 12, 13, 15)
- Konstantinos Christoforou – backing vocals (1, 2, 5, 6, 8, 9, 11, 12, 13, 14)
- Akis Diximos – second vocal (2, 4, 7, 10)
- Katerina Kiriakou – backing vocals (1, 2, 5, 6, 8, 9, 11, 12, 13, 14)
- George Kostoglou – bass (3, 5, 9)
- Kyriakos Gkouventas – violin (3)
- Takis Mitchopoulos – drums (3, 5, 9)
- Andreas Mouzakis – drums (2, 4, 6, 7, 10, 12, 13, 15)
- Alex Panayi – backing vocals (1, 2, 5, 6, 8, 9, 11, 12, 13, 14)
- Elena Patroclou – backing vocals (1, 2, 5, 6, 8, 9, 11, 12, 13, 14)
- Giorgos Theofanous – orchestration, programming
- Nikos Vardis – bass (2, 4, 6, 7, 10, 12, 13, 15)

=== Production ===
- Vasilis Bouloubasis – hair styling
- Dimitris Chorianopoulos – editing / mix engineer (9, 10)
- Yiannis Doulamis – production manager
- Sotiris Egkolfopoulos – sound engineer (vocals)
- Yiannis Ioannidis (Digital Press Hellas) – mastering
- Iakovos Kalaitzakis – make up
- Elias Lakkas – mix engineer (1, 2, 3, 4, 5, 6, 7, 8, 11, 12, 13, 14, 15) / sound engineer
- Q Creation – art direction
- Niovi Panagiotatou – sound engineer
- Peter Siakavellas (Digital Press Hellas) – mastering
- Dimitris Stamatiou – sound engineer (backing vocals)
- Despina Triantafillidou – cover processing
- Katerina Tsatsani – photographer

== Charts ==
Tosi Agapi Pos Na Hathei made its debut at number 1 on the 'Greece Top 50 Albums' charts.

Chart	Provider	Peak position	Certification
Greek Singles Chart	IFPI	1	Platinum
