= Os Eki Pou I Kardia Bori N' Antexi =

Os Eki Pou I Kardia Borei N' Antexi Ως Εκεί Που Η Καρδιά Μπορεί Ν' Αντέξει

Studio album by Natasa Theodoridou
- Released: 19 October 2005
- Recorded: Sofita studio
- Genre: Pop, Contemporary Laika
- Length: 1:14:12
- Label: Sony BMG Greece; Columbia
- Producer: Giannis Doulamis

Natasa Theodoridou chronology
Erota, Den Xereis N' Agapas (2004)	Os Eki Pou I Kardia Borei N' Antexi; Ως Εκεί Που Η Καρδιά Μπορεί Ν' Αντέξει (2005)	Eho Mia Agkalia (2006)

Singles from Os Ekei Pou I Kardia Mporei N' Antexei
- 1. "Den Se Noiazei Gia Mas" Released: September 2005; 2. "Apopse" Released: October 2005; 3. "Mia Glikia Melodia" Released: December 2005

Os Eki Pou I Kardia Borei N' Antexi (Greek: Ως Εκεί Που Η Καρδιά Μπορεί Ν' Αντέξει; English: As Much As The Heart Can Stand) is the seventh album by Greek singer Natasa Theodoridou. It was released on 19 October 2005 by Sony BMG Greece and received gold certification, selling 20,000 units. The album has a majority of composed songs by popular Greek singer and composer, Michalis Hatzigiannis and it's characterized by the variety of musical sounds.

== Track listing ==
Disc 1
No.	Title	Lyrics	Music	Length
1.	"Gia Poia Agapi Mou Milas" (Για Ποια Αγάπη Μου Μιλάς; For What Love Are You Talking About)	Ilias Filippou	Tasos Panagis	3:56
2.	"Den Se Noiazei Gia Mas" (Δεν Σε Νοιάζει Για Μας; You Don't Care About Us)	Christos Kantzelis	Tasos Panagis	3:38
3.	"Apopse" (Απόψε; Tonight)	Eleanna Vrachali	Michalis Chatzigiannis	3:37
4.	"Den Eimai Gia Sena" (Δεν Είμαι Για Σένα; I'm Not For You)	Eleanna Vrachali	Michalis Chatzigiannis	3:28
5.	"An Kapote" (Αν Κάποτε; If You Ever)	Dimitris Bagoulis	Christoforos Germenis	3:36
6.	"Na 'Soun Thalassa (ft. Sarbel)" (Να 'Σουν Θάλασσα; If You Were Sea)	Giannis Kalpouzos	Christoforos Germenis	4:06
7.	"Katastrofes" (Καταστροφές; Disasters)	Posidonas Giannopoulos	Kiriakos Papadopoulos	3:36
8.	"Kiriaki [Parapono Mou]" (Κυριακή [Παράπονο Μου]; Sunday [My Complain])	Christos Kantzelis	Tasos Panagis	3:40
9.	"Tha Orkisto S' Oti Eho Iero (ft. Bo)" (Θα Ορκιστώ Σ' Ότι Έχω Ιερό; I'll Swear To Every Holy Thing I Have)	Eleni Giannatsoulia	Tasos Liberis	4:21
10.	"Signomi, Ftaio" (Συγγνώμη φταίω; I’m sorry, it’s my fault)	Panos Falaras	Tasos Panagis	3:42
Total length:				37:20

Disc 2
No.	Title	Lyrics	Music	Length
1.	"Mia Glikia Melodia" (Μια Γλυκιά Μελωδία; A Sweet Melody)	Eleanna Vrachali	Michalis Chatzigiannis	4:05
2.	"Ta Kalitera Mou Hronia" (Τα Καλύτερα Μου Χρόνια; My Best Years)	Ilias Filippou	Kiriakos Papadopoulos	3:41
3.	"Stin Geitonia Tou Feggariou" (Στην Γειτονιά Του Φεγγαριού; On The Moon's Neighborhood)	Christos Kantezlis	Tasos Panagis	3:10
4.	"Den Se Xeperasa (ft. Giannis Parios)" (Δεν Σε Ξεπέρασα; I'm Not Over You)	Giannis Parios	Giannis Parios	4:38
5.	"Edo" (Εδώ; Here)	Christos Kantzelis	Tasos Panagis	3:25
6.	"Oute Stigmi" (Ούτε Στιγμή; Not A Moment)	Ilias Filippou	Kiriakos Papadopoulos	3:18
7.	"Oi Stales" (Οι Στάλες; The Raindrops)	Posidonas Giannopoulos	Kiriakos Papadopoulos	3:51
8.	"Tha To Metanioseis" (Θα Το Μετανιώσεις; You'll Regret This)	Ilias Filippou	Kiriakos Papadopoulos	3:32
9.	"Os Edo" (Ως Εδώ; Until Here)	Eleanna Vrachali	Michalis Chatzigiannis	3:28
10.	"I Mairi" (Η Μαίρη; Mary)	Eleni Giannatsoulia	Akis Diximos	3:45
Total length:				36:52

== Credits ==
=== Personnel ===
- Dimitris Antoniou: guitar (tracks: 1-3, 1-4, 2-1, 2-4, 2-9)
- Dimitris Bellos: orchestration, programming (tracks: 1-3, 1-4, 2-1, 2-9)
- Giannis Bithikotsis: baglama (tracks: 1-1, 1-8, 2-3) || bouzouki (tracks: 1-1, 1-2, 1-8, 2-3, 2-5) || cura (tracks: 1-8, 1-10)
- Michalis Chatzigiannis: guitar, piano (tracks: 1-4) || second vocal (tracks: 2-1)
- Thanasis Chondros: bass (tracks: 1-1, 1-2, 1-8, 1-10, 2-3, 2-5)
- Akis Diximos: backing vocals (tracks: 2-6) || second vocal (tracks: 1-1, 1-2, 1-5, 1-8, 1-10, 2-2, 2-3, 2-5, 2-8, 2-10)
- Spiros Dorizas: drums (tracks: 1-1, 1-2, 1-8, 1-10, 2-3, 2-5)
- Thanos Gkiouletzis: violin (tracks: 1-2, 1-10, 2-5)
- Babis Kemanetzidis: lyre (tracks: 2-6)
- Katerina Kiriakou: backing vocals (tracks: 2-6)
- Giorgos Lieros: violin (tracks: 1-7, 2-7)
- Andreas Mouzakis: drums (tracks: 1-3, 1-4, 1-5, 1-6, 1-7, 2-1, 2-2, 2-4, 2-6, 2-7, 2-8, 2-9, 2-10)
- Tasos Panagis: orchestration, programming (tracks: 1-1, 1-2, 1-8, 1-10, 2-3, 2-5)
- Kiriakos Papadopoulos: orchestration, programming (tracks: 1-7, 2-2, 2-6, 2-7)
- Stavros Pazarentsis: clarinet, ney (tracks: 1-7)
- Christos Pertsinidis: guitar (tracks: 1-1, 1-2, 1-5, 1-7, 1-8, 1-10, 2-2, 2-3, 2-5, 2-6, 2-7, 2-8, 2-10)
- Kostas Platakis: baglama (tracks: 1-5) || bouzouki (tracks: 1-5, 2-8, 2-10)
- Tasos Sokorelis: guitar (tracks: 1-6)
- Panagiotis Stergiou: baglama (tracks: 2-2) || bouzouki (tracks: 2-2, 2-6, 2-7) || mandolin (tracks: 2-7)
- Zoi Tiganouria: accordion (tracks: 1-5, 2-10)
- Giorgos Tzivelekis: bass (tracks: 1-3, 1-4, 1-5, 1-6, 1-7, 2-1, 2-2, 2-4, 2-6, 2-7, 2-8, 2-9, 2-10)
- Charis Varthakouris: backing vocals, orchestration, programming (tracks: 2-4)
- Babis Vichos: flute (tracks: 2-8)
- Thanasis Vichos: orchestration, programming (tracks: 1-5, 1-6, 1-9, 2-8, 2-10)

=== Production ===
- Vasilis Bouloubasis: hair styling
- Giannis Doulamis: executive producer
- Thodoris Ikonomou (Sofita studio): assistant sound engineer
- Giannis Ioannidis (D.P.H.): mastering
- Iakovos Kalaitzakis: make up
- Christos Karantzolas: photographer
- Lefteris Neromiliotis (Sofita studio): mix engineer, sound engineer
- Dimitris Rekouniotis: artwork
- Giorgos Segredakis: styling
- Petros Siakavellas (D.P.H.): mastering
- Giorgos Tzivelekis (Sofita studio): assistant sound engineer
