= Mia Kokkini Grammi =

Mia Kokkini Grammi Μια Κόκκινη Γραμμή

Studio album by Natasa Theodoridou
- Released: 10 July 2009
- Recorded: Workshop Studio
- Genre: Modern Laika
- Length: 46:19
- Label: Sony Music Greece; Columbia
- Producer: Giorgos Theofanous

Natasa Theodoridou chronology
| Natasa (2007) | Mia Kokkini Grammi; Μια Κόκκινη Γραμμή (2009) | I Zoi Mou Erotas (2010) |

Singles from Mia Kokkini Grammi
- 1. "Dipla Se Sena" Released: December 2008; 2. "Apantise Mou" Released: March 2009; 3. "Mia Kokkini Grammi" Released: June 2009; 4. "Kiklos" Released: September 2009

Mia Kokkini Grammi (Greek: Μια Κόκκινη Γραμμή; English: A Red Line) is the tenth studio album by Greek singer Natasa Theodoridou. It was released on 10 July 2009 by Sony Music Greece and received platinum certification in Greece, selling 12,000 units. The album was composed entirely by Giorgos Theofanous with Thanos Papanikolaou providing lyrics. It was released in discbox slider packaging and carried a fixed price of €9.90, roughly half the price of a typical album in the Greek market at the time. Theodoridou's lead single from the album "Mia Kokkini Grammi" peaked at number one on the Greek Radio Airplay chart.

== Track listing ==
All music is composed by Giorgos Theofanous.

| No. | Title | Lyrics | Length |
|---|---|---|---|
| 1. | "Kiklos" (Κύκλος; Circle) | Thanos Papanikolaou | 4:11 |
| 2. | "Mia Kokkini Grammi" (Μια Κόκκινη Γραμμή; A Red Line) | Thanos Papanikolaou | 4:21 |
| 3. | "Mazepse Ta Ola" (Μάζεψε Τα Όλα; Gather It All) | Thanos Papanikolaou | 4:20 |
| 4. | "Ela Sti Thesi Mou" (Έλα Στη Θέση Μου; Come In My Spot) | Thanos Papanikolaou | 3:36 |
| 5. | "Koitaxe Me Mes Sta Matia" (Κοίταξε Με Μες Στα Μάτια; Look Me In The Eyes) | Giorgos Theofanous | 3:47 |
| 6. | "Ola Mou Ftaine" (Όλα Μου Φταίνε; Everything Is At Fault) | Giorgos Theofanous | 4:24 |
| 7. | "Ase Me Na Ziso" (Άσε Με Να Ζήσω; Let Me Live) | Thanos Papanikolaou | 4:15 |
| 8. | "Dipla Se Sena" (Δίπλα Σε Σένα; Next To You) | Thanos Papanikolaou | 4:10 |
| 9. | "Apantise Mou" (Απάντησε Μου; Answer Me) | Thanos Papanikolaou | 3:55 |
| 10. | "Oneiro" (Όνειρο; Dream) | Giorgos Theofanous | 3:50 |
| 11. | "Oneiro (Ecotek project remix)" | | 5:29 |
| Total length: | | | 46:19 |

== Credits ==
Credits adapted from liner notes.

=== Personnel ===
- Giannis Bithikotsis: baglama (tracks: 2, 5, 9) || bouzouki (tracks: 2, 4, 5, 8, 9) || cura (tracks: 2, 6)
- Savvas Christodoulou: guitar (tracks: 2, 4, 5, 6, 8, 9, 10)
- Akis Diximos: backing vocals (tracks: 2, 3, 7, 10) || second vocal (tracks: 4, 5, 8, 9)
- Giorgos Galanos: orchestration, programming (tracks: 3)
- Simos Kinalis: säz (tracks: 10)
- Katerina Kiriakou: backing vocals (tracks: 2, 3, 7, 10)
- Spiros Kontakis: guitar (tracks: 1, 3)
- Kostas Liolios: drums (tracks: 1, 2, 4, 5, 6, 8, 9, 10)
- Antonis Ntontos: saxophone (tracks: 6)
- Giorgos Theofanous: orchestration, programming (tracks: 2, 5, 6)
- Zoi Tiganouria: accordion (tracks: 2, 10)
- Leonidas Tzitzos: orchestration, programming (tracks: 1, 4, 7, 8, 9, 10)
- Nikos Vardis: bass (tracks: 1, 2, 4, 5, 6, 8, 9, 10)

=== Production ===
- Vasilis Bouloubasis: hair styling
- Tasos Chamosfakidis (Workshop studio): mix engineer, sound engineer
- Dimitris Chorianopoulos (Workshop studio): mix engineer, sound engineer
- Giannis Doulamis: production manager
- Mirto Gkonou: art direction
- Thodoris Ikonomou (Sofita studio): mix engineer, sound engineer (baglama, bouzouki, cura)
- Giannis Ioannidis (D.P.H.): mastering
- Iakovos Kalaitzakis: make up, photographer
- Lefteris Neromiliotis (Sofita studio): mix engineer, sound engineer (baglama, bouzouki, cura)
- Giorgos Segredakis: styling
- The Flying Pot: artwork
- Giorgos Theofanous: executive producer
