= Kalispera =

Kalispera Καλησπέρα

Studio album by Petros Iakovidis
- Released: 3 June 2023
- Genre: Pop, Modern laika
- Length: 48:34
- Language: Greek
- Label: Panik Records
- Producer: Spyros Potamopoulos

Petros Iakovidis chronology
| Odos Tsimiski (2022) | Kalispera; Καλησπέρα (2023) |

Singles from Kalispera
- 1. "Na Na Na (Tragoudo Gia Sena)" Released: 09 December 2022; 2. "Ah Kardoula Mou" Released: 27 March 2023; 3. "Sikose To Tilefono" Released: 6 June 2023; 4. "Gia Panta" Released: 18 September 2023

Kalispera (Greek: Καλησπέρα; English: Good Evening) is the fourth studio album by the Greek artist Petros Iakovidis, released on 3 June 2023 in Greece and Cyprus, and is his first album with Panik Records.

== Track listing ==
| No. | Title | Lyrics | Music | Length |
|---|---|---|---|---|
| 1. | "Kalispera" (Καλησπέρα; Good Evening) | Petros Iakovidis | Petros Iakovidis | 2:56 |
| 2. | "Na Na Na (Tragoudo Gia Sena)" (Να Να Να (Τραγουδώ Για Σένα); I'm Singing For You) | Apon | Petros Iakovidis, Diaskevi paradosiakou tragoudiou | 3:22 |
| 3. | "Pos To Kaneis Ayto" (Πως Το Κάνεις Αυτό; How Do You Do That) | Ilias Filippou | Petros Iakovidis | 3:11 |
| 4. | "Kati Magiko" (Κάτι Μαγικό; Something Magical) | Ilias Filippou | Petros Iakovidis | 2:59 |
| 5. | "Ax Kardoula Mou" (Αχ Καρδούλα Μου; Oh My Little Heart) | Petros Iakovidis | Petros Iakovidis | 3:29 |
| 6. | "Emena" (Εμένα; Me) | Petros Iakovidis | Petros Iakovidis, Giorgos Galanos | 3:09 |
| 7. | "Sikose To Tilefono" (Σήκωσε Το Τηλέφωνο; Pick Up The Phone) | Petros Iakovidis | Petros Iakovidis | 2:29 |
| 8. | "Sou Apagorevetai" (Σου Απαγορεύεται; You Are Forbidden) | Petros Iakovidis | Petros Iakovidis | 2:57 |
| 9. | "Me Theleis – Se Thelo (Featuring Lena Zevgara)" (Με Θέλεις – Σε Θέλω; You Want Me – I Want You) | Petros Iakovidis | Petros Iakovidis | 3:02 |
| 10. | "Gia Panta" (Για Πάντα; Forever) | Lemonis Skopelitis | Lemonis Skopelitis | 2:25 |
| 11. | "Ante Stin Ygeia Sou" (Άντε Στην Υγειά Σου; I Come On For Your Health) | Natalia Germanou | Petros Iakovidis | 3:09 |
| 12. | "Na Se Hairetai" (Να Σε Χαίρεται; Be Happy) | Petros Iakovidis | Petros Iakovidis | 2:54 |
| 13. | "Pali Nyxta" (Πάλι Νύχτα; The Night Again) | Ilias Filippou | Petros Iakovidis | 2:43 |
| 14. | "Episkepseis" (Επισκέψεις; Visitor) | Petros Iakovidis | Petros Iakovidis | 4:15 |
| 15. | "Haramata" (Χαράματα; Dawn) | Ilias Filippou | Petros Iakovidis | 2:47 |
| 16. | "Se Proseho" (Σε Προσέχω; I Take Care Of You) | Ilias Filippou | Petros Iakovidis | 2:47 |
| Total length: | | | | 48:34 |

== Music videos ==
- "Na Na Na (Tragoudo Gia Sena)"
- "Ah Kardoula Mou"
- "Sikose To Tilefono"
- "Gia Panta"

== Release history ==
| Region | Date | Label | Format | Version |
|---|---|---|---|---|
| Greece | 3 June 2023 | Panik Records | CD, digital download | Original |
| Cyprus | 3 June 2023 | Panik Records | CD, digital download | Original |

== Personnel ==
- Spyros Potamopoulos – executive producer, management
- Sofia Bekiari – project manager
- Ilias Batsaras – artwork
- Haris Anthis – styling
- Manos Kopsaheilis – make up
- Vasileiosf – photography
