= Natasa (album) =

Natasa Νατάσα

Studio album by Natasa Theodoridou
- Released: 27 November 2007
- Recorded: Sofita studio
- Genre: Modern Laika
- Length: 50:24
- Label: Sony BMG Greece; Columbia
- Producer: Giannis Doulamis

Natasa Theodoridou chronology
Eho Mia Agkalia (2006)	Natasa; Νατάσα (2007)	Dipla Se Sena (2008)

Singles from Natasa
- 1. "Pali" Released: October 2007; 2. "Den Thelo Tipota" Released: February 2008; 3. "Na M' Agapas" Released: June 2008

Natasa (Greek: Νατάσα) is the ninth album by Greek artist Natasa Theodoridou. It was released on 27 November 2007 by Sony BMG Greece and received gold certification, selling 15,000 units. The album was written entirely by Kiriakos Papadopoulos on music and Ilias Filippou on lyrics. The songs "Pali", "Den Thelo Tipota" and "Na M' Agapas" became big hits on radio stations.

== Track listing ==
No.	Title	Length
1.	"Pali" (Πάλι; Again)	3:25
2.	"Den Thelo Tipota" (Δεν Θέλω Τίποτα; I Don't Want Anything)	3:56
3.	"Na M' Agapas" (Να Μ' Αγαπάς; Love Me)	4:00
4.	"Na Teleionoume Edo" (Να Τελειώνουμε Εδώ; Be Ending Here)	3:40
5.	"Thavma" (Θαύμα; Miracle)	4:08
6.	"Kalinihta, S' Agapo" (Καληνύχτα, Σ' Αγαπώ; Good Night, I Love You)	3:41
7.	"Oute Mia Lexi" (Ούτε Μια Λέξη; Not Even A Word)	4:37
8.	"Kala Pou Efiges" (Καλά Που Έφυγες; It's Good That You Left)	3:26
9.	"Anoixe Mou Tin Kardia Sou" (Άνοιξε Μου Την Καρδιά Σου; Open Your Heart To Me)	3:59
10.	"San Mia Tainia" (Σαν Μια Ταινία; Like A Movie)	3:57
11.	"Ola Ta 'Svisa" (Όλα Τα 'Σβησα; I Put Them All Out)	3:44
12.	"Agapi Pou Skotonei" (Αγάπη Που Σκοτώνει; Love That Kills)	3:18
13.	"Xenitia Mou" (Ξενυχτιά Μου; Μy Late Night)	4:33
Total length:		50:24

== Credits ==
Credits adapted from liner notes.

=== Personnel ===
- Hakan Bingolou: cümbüş (tracks: 4) || oud (tracks: 5, 11)
- Giannis Bithikotsis: baglama (tracks: 2, 7) || bouzouki (tracks: 1, 2, 4, 7, 9) || cura (tracks: 1, 2, 4, 7)
- Akis Diximos: backing vocals (tracks: 3, 4, 5, 11, 13) || second vocal (tracks: 1, 2, 6, 8, 10)
- Giorgos Galanos: programming (tracks: 10, 12)
- Andreas Giatrakos: guitar (tracks: 13) || orchestration, programming (tracks: 9, 13)
- Panagiotis Giatrakos: bass, orchestration (tracks: 9)
- Thanos Gkiouletzis: violin (tracks: 1, 4, 8)
- Antonis Gounaris: cümbüş (tracks: 6) || guitar, orchestration, programming (tracks: 2, 6, 7)
- Giannis Grigoriou: bass (tracks: 1, 2, 3, 4, 5, 7, 8, 10, 11, 12)
- Anna Ioannidou: backing vocals (tracks: 4, 5, 13)
- Manolis Karantinis: baglama (tracks: 10, 11, 12) || bouzouki (tracks: 8, 10, 11, 12)
- Katerina Kiriakou: backing vocals (tracks: 4, 5, 13)
- Zacharias Maragkos: guitar (tracks: 3, 5, 11)
- Andreas Mouzakis: drums (tracks: 1, 2, 3, 4, 5, 6, 7, 8, 10, 11, 12)
- Charis Papadopoulos: keyboards (tracks: 13)
- Kiriakos Papadopoulos: accordion (tracks: 12) || keyboards (tracks: 1, 2, 3, 4, 5, 6, 7, 8, 10, 11, 12) || orchestration (tracks: 1, 3, 4, 5, 8, 10, 11, 12) || programming (tracks: 1, 3, 4, 5, 8, 10, 11)
- Stavros Pazarentsis: clarinet (tracks: 3, 5, 13) || ney (tracks: 3, 5, 6, 13)
- Christos Pertsinidis: guitar (tracks: 1, 4, 8, 10, 12)
- Grigoris Petrakos: guitar (tracks: 3, 13)
- Manolis Platakis: guitar (tracks: 9)
- Thanasis Rokas: violin (tracks: 3, 5)
- Andreas Siderakis: drums (tracks: 9)
- Nikos Stavropoulos: bouzouki, cura (tracks: 10)
- Andreas Trapalis: violin (tracks: 9)

=== Production ===
- Vasilis Bouloubasis: hair styling
- Giannis Doulamis: executive producer
- Thodoris Ikonomou (Sofita studio): sound engineer
- Giannis Ioannidis (D.P.H.): mastering
- Giorgos Marketakis: make up
- Tzortzia Michalopoulou: art direction
- Lefteris Neromiliotis (Sofita studio): mix engineer, sound engineer
- Thodoris Psiachos: photographer
- Dimitris Rekouniotis: artwork
- Giorgos Segredakis: styling
- Vasilis Tsouparopoulos: illustration
