= I Zoi Mou Erotas =

I Zoi Mou Erotas Η Ζωή Μου Έρωτας

Studio album by Natasa Theodoridou
- Released: November 28, 2010
- Genre: Modern laika, pop
- Length: 30:04
- Label: Sony Music Greece/Columbia
- Producer: Giorgos Moukidis

Natasa Theodoridou chronology
Mia Kokkini Grammi (2009)	I Zoi Mou Erotas; Η Ζωή Μου Έρωτας (2010)	Apenanti (2012)

Singles from I Zoi Mou Erotas
- 1. "Ena Kalo Filo Mou Na Vro" Released: September 26, 2010; 2. "Tora Tha Ponas" Released: November 26, 2010; 3. "Psema" Released: January 6, 2011; 4. "Kalinihta" Released: February 7, 2011

I Zoi Mou Erotas (Greek: Η Ζωή Μου Έρωτας; English: My Life Love) is an album by popular Greek artist Natasa Theodoridou, released on November 28, 2010 by Sony Music Greece. All music and lyrics are by Giorgos Moukidis.

== Track listing ==
1. "Eho Akoma Polla" (Έχω ακόμα πολλά; I still have a lot) – 3:47
2. "Psema" (Ψέμα; Α Lie) – 3:35
3. "Tora Tha Ponas" (Τώρα θα πονάς; Now, it hurts) – 4:29
4. "Mi Stamatas" (Μη σταματάς; Do not stop!) – 3:35
5. "Ena Kalo Filo Mou Na Vro" (feat. Nikos Vertis) (Ένα καλό φίλο μου να βρω; A good friend of mine to find) – 3:43
6. "Rotas" (Ρωτάς; You ask) – 3:50
7. "Poios Tha Pistepsi" (Ποιος θα πιστέψει; Who would believe?) – 2:52
8. "Kalinihta" (feat. Giorgos Moukidis) (Καληνύχτα; Good night) – 4:13

== Chart performance ==
The album debuted on the Greek Albums Chart at number one in week 48 of 2010.

Chart	Peak position
Greek Albums Chart (IFPI Greece)	1
