= Tus (rapper) =

Greek rapper

- Born: Christos Tousis; 23 July 1986 (age 40); Parga, Greece
- Notable work: "Mana X Ouranou" "Krokodilos" "Boulgares"

Christos Tousis (Greek: Χρήστος Τούσης; born 23 July 1986), better known as Tus, is a Greek rapper.

== Career ==
Tus was born in Parga, Greece, and has been active in rapping from a young age. His first album came out in 2007 (Mana X Ouranou); this was followed by LOONEY TUS in 2009, Mana X Ouranou 2 (2011) and Filakia (2015). He has appeared in several TV advertisements.

He has collaborated with Greek musicians including Lefteris Pantazis, Angela Dimitriou, Elisavet Spanou, and Demis Anastasiadis.

=== Human trafficking song ===
In August 2016, Tus released a song called "Boulgares" (Bulgarian women), describing human trafficking in Greece, and (according to critics) glorifying it. In the song, Tus proudly boasts of illegally importing Bulgarian, Romanian and Russian women for a cheap price, so that they can be "used" by young Greek men.

The song has provoked harsh criticism from Greek feminist organizations, as well as from Central and Eastern European immigrants to Greece. The Greek General Secretariat for Gender Equality (an official government agency) has officially condemned the song as sexist and racist, and has stated that it will try to have the song removed from all Greek media.

Tus himself denies being racist or sexist, and states that the aim of the song is to raise awareness to the issue of human trafficking, which, he claims, is hypocritically and superficially dealt with by Greek media; he has also stated that he will not be cowed by the media's attempts to silence and censor his work.

Human trafficking is prevalent in Greece, especially in Athens. Most of the women trafficked are from Bulgaria, Romania, Russia, Ukraine, Nigeria, Poland, Georgia and Moldova. Albanian and Greek mobsters along with corrupt Greek police officers dominate the industry.

== Discography ==
=== Studio albums ===
- Mana X Ouranou (2007)
- Looney Tus (2009)
- Mana X Ouranou 2 (2011)
- Filakia (2015)

=== Selected singles ===
- "Μωρό μου σε αφήνω"
- "Κροκόδειλος"
- "Πρώτος στο σχολείο"
- "Υποβρύχιες Καταστροφές"
- "Όπως Λάχει Εμείς Οι Βλάχοι"
- "Roufa to tromponi"
- "Gkomena Garida"
- "Mou Th Peftane"
- "Antiti"
- "Shqiptare"
- "Agapmo mia pitsirika"
- "Oplopolivolo"
- "1312"
- "Tourkales"
- "Zemra"
- "Mou ’rthe mana to charti"
- "Alket Rizai"
- "Criminal"
- "Megethyntikos Fakos"
- "Boulgares"
- "To Antitheto Akrivos"
- "Billy Sio Tattoo RMX"
- "Thimata"
- "Mounodoulos"
