= Petros Iakovidis =

Greek singer

Petros Iakovidis Πέτρος Ιακωβίδης
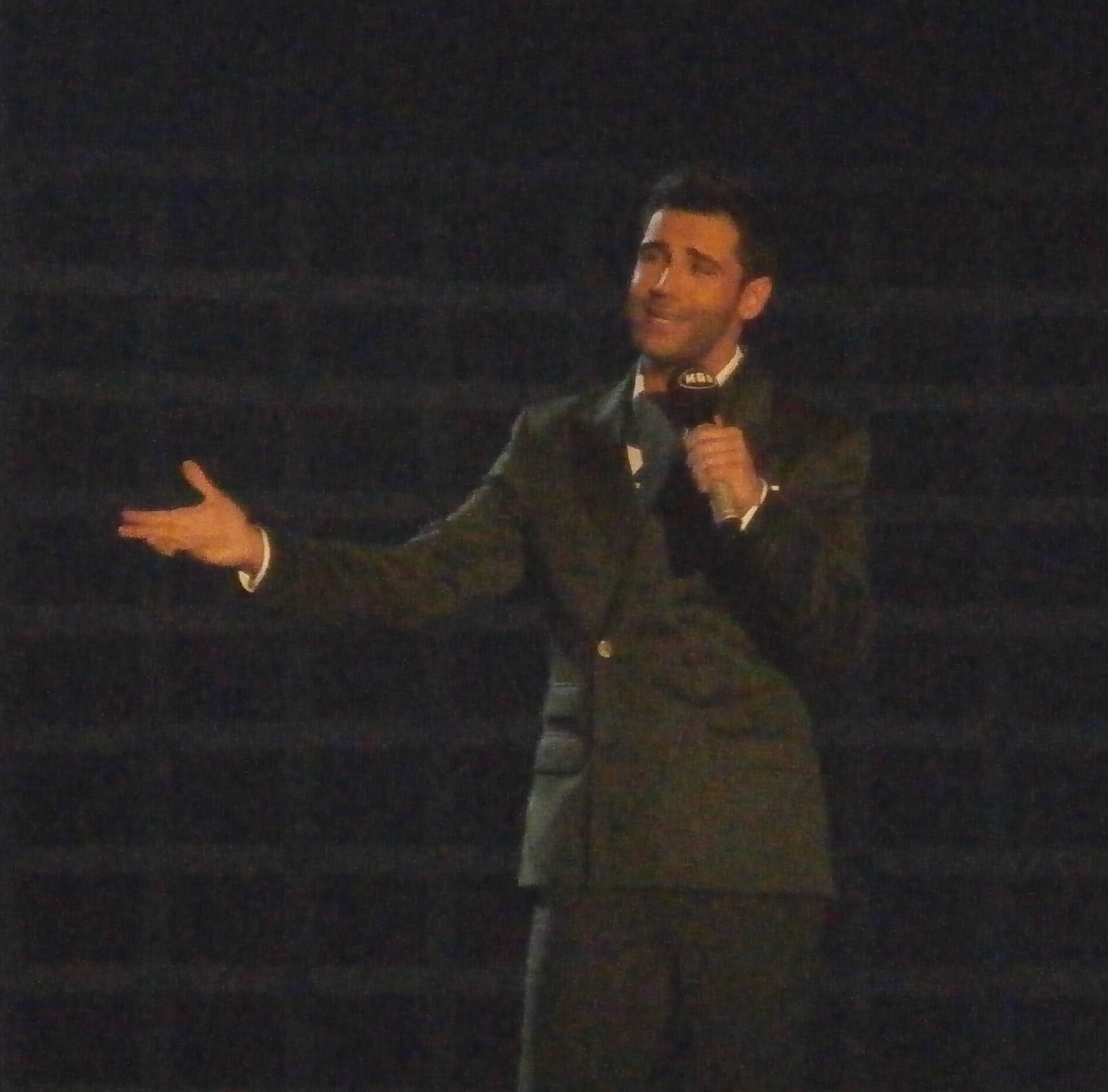

Background information
- Born: 12 September 1988 (age 37); Kavala, Greece
- Genres: Laïko; pop
- Occupations: Singer; songwriter
- Instruments: Vocals; guitar; piano; bouzouki
- Years active: 2015–present
- Labels: Minos EMI (2015–2022) Panik Records (2022–present)

Petros Iakovidis (Greek: Πέτρος Ιακωβίδης, born 12 September 1988) is a Greek singer, composer and lyricist. Iakovidis has been involved in music since his early student years. He has studies in musical instruments such as guitar, bouzouki, percussion and piano. Since 2015, he has been a performer of his own songs as well as a composer and lyricist of songs performed by artists such as Konstantinos Argyros and Natassa Theodoridou.

== Biography ==
=== Early years ===
Petros Iakovidis spent his childhood in Kavala, Greece. He began working as a singer at 15. His grandfather is a singer and friend of Stelios Kazantzidis, his younger sister Morfoula Iakovidou is also a singer. His father Stavros Iakovidis is a former footballer, who played for teams such as Doxa Drama and Xanthi.

=== Music career ===
In March 2015, Iakovidis recorded his first single "O erotas mou gine" (Become my love) with the music label Minos EMI.

In 2016, he released the songs "Vale" (Pour), "Agkalia" (Hug) and "Koritsaki mou" (My little girl), all of which charted in Greece. In June 2017, he presented his first studio album titled Apotipomata (Fingerprints). A few months later, the album was certified gold.

At the end of 2018, Iakovidis released his second studio album entitled Sou Ta 'Dosa Ola (I gave you everything). The album contains 10 songs, with music by himself and lyrics by Olga Vlachopoulou and Vicky Gerothodorou. The following songs gained airplay: "Gela mou" (Laugh for me), "Vradia aximerota" (Nights without dawn), "Min tolmiseis" (Don't you dare), "Sou ta 'dosa ola" and "Paraferesai" (You are behaving poorly).

On 2 July 2019, he released the song "Fovamai" (I'm scared). The following year, the songs "Koimisou apopse edo" (Sleep here tonight), "S'agapao sou fonaxa" (I shouted to you "I love you") and "Mi thimoneis" (Don't get mad) were released.

In 2021, Iakovidis won the award Best Video–Elliniko Horeftiko with the song "S'agapao sou fonaxa" at the MAD Video Music Awards 2021. The same year the songs "Tatouaz" (Tattoo), "Mou 'leipses poli" (I've missed you so much) and "Asto" (Let it go) were released. With song "Mou 'leipses poli", he won the award Best Laiko Song at the MAD Video Music Awards 2022.

In the summer of 2022, his third studio album Odos Tsimiski was released. In December 2022 he was awarded by the mayor of Thessaloniki with a special honorary plaque for Odos Tsimiski as a sign of recognition and thanks, for his contribution to the prominence of one of the most characteristic streets of the city. After signing with Panik Records, his first song released was "Na na na (Tragoudo gia sena)" (I'm singing for you) which met success, followed by two other singles "Ah kardoula mou" (Oh my little heart) and "Sikose to tilefono" (Pick up the phone). In 2022, he was the leader of the Fantasia Live night show alongside singer Josephine and in 2023, for the second year in the row he again appeared at Fantasia Live, this time alongside Lena Zevgara.

In 2023, he released his new album Kalispera (Good evening) from Panik Records.

== Discography ==
=== Studio albums ===
- Apotipomata (2017)
- Sou Ta 'Dosa Ola (2018)
- Odos Tsimiski (2022)
- Kalispera (2023)
