= Natasa Theodoridou =

Greek singer

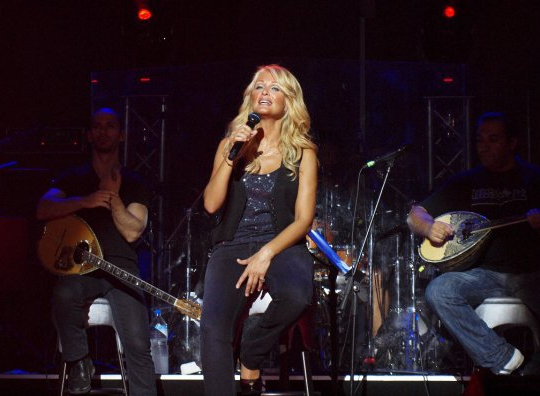

Background information
- Born: 24 October 1970 (age 55); Thessaloniki, Greece
- Origin: Drama, Greece
- Genres: Contemporary laïka
- Instrument: Vocals (mezzo soprano – contralto)
- Years active: 1988–present
- Labels: Sony Music Greece (1997–2012), Minos EMI (2013–2015), Heaven Music (2016–present)
- Website: www.natasatheodoridou.com.gr

Natasa Theodoridou (Greek: Νατάσα Θεοδωρίδου; born 24 October 1970) is a Greek singer. She is the only female Greek artist to have her first three albums achieve platinum status. She has been certified for a total of at least 432 thousand albums and 20 thousand singles sales by IFPI Greece. On 14 March 2010, Alpha TV ranked Theodoridou the 12th best selling female singer in the nation's phonographic era (since 1960), with a total of ten platinum and three gold albums.

== Career ==
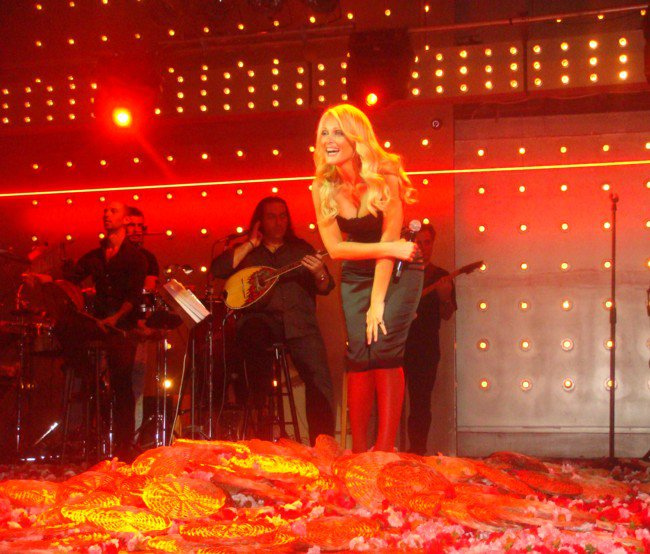
Natassa Theodoridou in Votanikos, Athens, 2011

=== 1996–2001 ===
Theodoridou was born and raised in Drama. She studied journalism and at the same time she attended guitar and harmony lessons. During her studies she began her singing career in Thessaloniki.

In 1996, she relocated to Athens where she appeared at the music hall "Handres" next to other big Greek singers such as Antonis Remos, Labis Livieratos and Triantaphillos. This opportunity led to more massive recognition for her, and multiple professional singing offers. Her high quality performance on stage along with her voice and style led to her self-titled debut album, Natasa Theodoridou, being released in August 1997. The album went platinum in no time, establishing Theodoridou as one of the biggest names in the Greek music scene.

Her second album "Defteri Agapi" (Second Love) was released in 1998, and also achieved platinum status sales. In that year she appeared with Notis Sfakianakis, while in the summer she cooperated at the music hall "Asteria" with Paschalis Terzis. Her commercial success continued with the release of her third platinum album, Tha Miliso Me T'Asteria in 2000. The same season she appeared with Giorgos Mazonakis and Stelios Dionysiou. The following year, she released her fourth -multi-collective- album, Ip'Efthini Mou, with a Greek adaptation of Shakira's hit single Ojos Asi, adapted to "Kataziteitai" (Wanted) in Greek.

=== 2002–2008 ===
Nikos Kourkoulis, Elli Kokkinou & Natassa Theodoridou at club "Votanikos" in 2007

In 2002 she collaborated with the songwriter and composer Giorgos Theofanous, in the album Tosi Agapi Pos Na Hathei, which resulted in big commercial success. That same year, she started appearing alone for the first time in the music scene "Fos", which would become her "home" for the following three years. During that period, Natassa released a live album (2003) and then collaborated with Evanthia Rebutsika, the composer of her sixth album Erota, Den Ksereis N'Agapas (2004).

In 2005, Natassa returned to the big musical halls, working with Giannis Parios and Sarbel, while her seventh, multi-collective, studio album, Os Ekei Pou I Kardia Bori N'Andexi was released. In 2006, Eho Mia Agkalia was released. It was written by composer Giorgos Moukidis and was certified gold.

In 2007, she released the album "Natasa", celebrating her 10 years in Greek discography. The album gained gold certification only two weeks after its release. In September she started appearances with Nikos Kourkoulis and Elli Kokkinou at club "Votanikos". Sarbel soon replaced Kokkinou because of her pregnancy.

In 2008, Theodoridou signed again with Sony BMG Greece. On 17 October 2008, she began appearances with Giorgos Mazonakis at club Votanikos for the winter season; her third consecutive winter singing there. In November 2008, she released Dipla Se Sena, a two-disc best-of album that included 37 older hits of her career, a DVD with music videos, and three new songs written by Giorgos Theofanous with lyrics by Thanos Papanikolaou. The first single from the album was "Dipla Se Sena" (Next to you) and was released to radio stations on 27 October 2008.

=== 2009–present ===
In July 2009, Theodoridou released the studio album "Mia Kokkini Grammi", cooperating for the second time, after 2002, with composer Giorgos Theofanous. The album was certified platinum, with the self-titled song becoming a big hit and being as well awarded at the 2010 Mad Video Music Awards. In 2010 she cooperated again with Giorgos Moukidis in her eleventh studio album, I Zoi Mou Erotas.

In 2012 Theodoridou collaborated for the third time with Theofanous in the album Apenanti. The following year her 13th studio album, S'Agapo was released. The album was the last work for the composer Antonis Vardis. They collaborated again with Theofanous in the live album "Mazi me Sena" (2015).

The following year, 2016, Theodoridou released the album "Asta ola ki ela", which marked her departure from Minos-EMI for Heaven Music. The album was composed by Giorgos Sampanis.

=== Collaborations ===
Theodoridou has worked with numerous well-known composers and songwriters who had helped her set new standards in local music repertoire. Giorgos Theofanous, Giorgos Moukidis, Petros Iakovidis, Antonis Vardis, Giannis Parios, Kyriakos Papadopoulos, Ilias Filippou, Giannis Papadopoulos, Mihalis Hatzigiannis, Eleanna Vrachali, Evanthia Reboutsika, Michalis Gkanas, Vasilis Giannopoulos, Natalia Germanou, Thanos Papanikolaou, Tasos Panagis, Panos Falaras, Triantaphillos, Evi Droutsa, Eleni Giannatsoulia and Phoebus are only a few of the songwriters and composers who have worked with Natassa.

== Personal life ==
Natassa Theodoridou was married twice. The first time was to Takis Betas while she was living in Thessaloniki. Her daughter Christianna was born in 1994. She got a divorce in 1996 and relocated to Athens along with her daughter. Her second marriage was with plastic surgeon, Andreas Foustanos in 1999. She gave birth to her second daughter, Andrianna, in 2000. Theodoridou and Foustanos divorced in 2007. Her brother Thalis is a football coach.

== Discography ==
=== Studio albums ===
All the albums listed underneath were released and charted in Greece and Cyprus.

Studio albums
Year	Title	Certification
1997	Natasa Theodoridou	Platinum
1998	Defteri Agapi	Platinum
2000	Tha Miliso Me T' Asteria	Platinum
2001	Ip' Efthini Mou	Gold
2002	Tosi Agapi Pos Na Hathei	Platinum
2004	Erota, De Xereis N' Agapas	Gold
2005	Os Ekei Pou I Kardia Mporei N' Antexei	Gold
2006	Eho Mia Agkalia	Gold
2007	Natasa	Gold
2009	Mia Kokkini Grammi	Platinum
2010	I Zoi Mou Erotas	Gold
2012	Apenanti	Platinum
2013	S' Agapo	Gold
2016	As' Ta Ola Ki Ela	Gold
2018	Pote Den Efiga Apo 'Do	-
2025	Itan Na Vrethoume	-

=== Live albums ===
All the albums listed underneath were released and charted in Greece and Cyprus.

Live albums
Year	Title	Certification
2003	Mia Diadromi Thessaloniki - Athina	Platinum
2015	Mazi me sena (with Giorgos Theofanous)	

=== CD singles ===
CD singles
Year	Title	Certification
2002	"Ola Na Ta Ziso Ap'Tin Arhi"	Platinum

=== Compilation albums ===
Compilation albums
Year	Title	Certification
2008	Dipla Se Sena	Platinum
2012	Stigmes (with Giorgos Theofanous)	
