= Triantaphillos =

- Τριαντάφυλλος
- Born: Triantaphillos Chatzinicolaou; 20 June 1977 (age 48); Rhodes, Greece
- Occupations: Singer, songwriter, Musician
- Years active: 1985–present
- Spouse: Dimitra Siambani 2014 – divorce 2026
- Children: 1 (Nicolas Chatzinicolaou)
- Parents: Nikolaos Chatzinicolaou (father); Sevasti Chatzinicolaou (mother)
- Musical career
- Origin: Greece
- Instrument: Vocals
- Labels: Sony Music Greece (1996–1997); Columbia Records (1997–2003); Alpha Records (2008–2010); Play Records (2017–2019); ICON MUSIC Records (2020–2021); Heaven Music (2021–present)

Triantaphillos Chatzinicolaou (Greek: Τριαντάφυλλος Χατζηνικολάου), known professionally as Triantaphillos (Greek: Τριαντάφυλλος) (born 20 June 1977), is a Greek singer.

== Biography ==
Triantaphillos was born on 20 June 1977 in Rhodes. At the age of 19 he moved to Athens. His first album Vlepo kati oneira (Βλέπω κάτι όνειρα) sold more than 48,000 copies in its first three months. His second album Grammata kai afieroseis (Γράμματα και αφιερώσεις) was certified platinum, while his third, I agapi den pernaei (Η αγάπη δεν περνάει) became gold. Triantaphillos released a CD single in July 2009, with the title "Epitelous oi dio mas" ("Επιτέλους οι δυο μας") and began to reside in Volos on 29 January 2010.

== Discography ==
=== Albums ===
Album names	year published
Βλέπω Κάτι Όνειρα	1997
Γράμματα Κι Αφιερώσεις	1998
Η Αγάπη Δεν Περνάει	1999
Μην Αργείς	2000
Αφήστε Μήνυμα	2001
Για Μένα Είσαι Εσύ	2002
Μαζί Ξανά	2003
Καλύτερα	2004
Live + 5 Studio	2006
Στο Δικό Μου Σταθμό	2008

=== Compilations ===
Year	Various
2020	Αδρεναλίνη
2021	Best Of - Οι Μεγαλύτερες Επιτυχίες

=== Singles ===
Year	Title
2009	"Επιτέλους Οι Δυο Μας "
2011	"Καινούργια Έκανα Αρχή"
2012	"Εδώ Τελειώνει Το Παιχνίδι"
2012	"Φεύγω Πρώτα Εγώ"
2012	"Μα Τι Φαντάστηκες"
2012	"Δεν Παίζει Τίποτα"
2013	"Δεν Αστειεύομαι"
2013	"Τέρμα Σου Λέω"
2014	"Ανανεωμένος Και Τρελλός"
2015	"Καλά Μας Κάνεις"
2016	"Αδρεναλίνη"
2016	"Το Πιό Γλυκό Κοριτσάκι"
2017	"Χτύπησε Κόκκινο"
2018	"Γυάλινη Καρδιά"
2019	"Τα Σπάω"
2020	"Σε Τεντωμένο Σχοινί"
2022	"Όλα Ακατάλληλα"
2022	"Σε Παίρνω Για Να Σου Πω"

2026 || "Τώρα Τελευταία"

=== Cover Editions ===
Year	Title	Label
2021	Σπάω Τα Ρολόγια	Heaven Music
2021	Αν Περάσεις Την Πόρτα	Heaven Music
2021	Βλέπω Κάτι Όνειρα	Heaven Music

=== Duets ===
Year	Song title	With
1997	"Μη Γυρίσεις Ξανά"	Natassa Theodoridou
1999	"Μ'Αφησε"	Dionisis Skhinas
2000	"Οι Φίλοι"	Kostas Doxas
2002	"Μια ζωή"	Irini Merkouri
2014	"Σου Τ’ Όρκίζομαι"	Elias Gee
2015	"Απ'το Τηλέφωνο"	Tus
2019	"Τα Σπάω (Official Remix)"	Tus
2020	"Πάμε"	Petros Imvrios
2021	"Σπάω Τα Ρολόγια"	Alcatrash
2023	"Αργούσες"	Elena Grekou
2023	"Boom Boom"	Bo

2024

| "ΝΑΙ ΝΑΙ ΝΑΙ" | Dj Stephan

== Music videos ==
Year	Title	Album	Music and Lyrics	Producer
1997	"Mi Gyriseis Xana" (Μη Γυρίσεις ΞανάDo Not Come Back Again) .ft. Natassa Theodoridou	Natassa Theodoridou	Eleni Giannatsoulia, Natacha Atlas, Lee H, Page N, Wheelan T	Avraam Papavramopoulos
1997	"Vlepo Kati Oneiro" (I see some dreams)	Vlepo Kati Oneiro	Evi Droutsa, Konstantinos Pantzis	Petros H
1997	"Min Me Tripas San To Triadafillo" (Don't prick me like the rose)	Vlepo Kati Oneiro	Evi Droutsa, Konstantinos Pantzis	Vasilis Tselemegkos
1997	"Se Pia Parigoria" (I want you to beg me)	Vlepo Kati Oneiro	Evi Droutsa, Konstantinos Pantzis	Vasilis Tselemegkos
1997	"Se Dio Lepta" (In two minutes)	Vlepo Kati Oneiro	Thodoris Makridis	Loukia Andreadi
1998	"Monahos" (Alone)	Grammata Ki Afieroseis	Evi Droutsa, Konstantinos Pantzis	Manolis Tzirakis
1998	"Afto Mou Elipe" (That's The Only Thing I Don't Need)	Grammata Ki Afieroseis	Evi Droutsa, Konstantinos Pantzis	Georgos Gavalos
1998	"An Perasis Tin Porta" (If You Pass The Door)	Grammata Ki Afieroseis	Andreas Vasiliou, Triantaphillos	Georgos Gavalos
1998	"Stin Proseuhi Sou" (In your prayer)	Grammata Ki Afieroseis	Evi Droutsa, Konstantinos Pantzis	Georgos Gavalos
1998	"Den Einai Porta I Psihi" (The Soul Is Not A Door)	Grammata Ki Afieroseis	Evi Droutsa, Triantaphillos	Georgos Gavalos
1999	"Ela Omos Pou Den Pernaei" (Come But That Does Not Pass)	I Agapi Den Pernai	Niki Spyropoulou, Konstantinos Pantzis	Kostas Kapetanidis
1999	"Moro Mou" (My Baby)	I Agapi Den Pernaei	Evi Droutsa, Konstantinos Pantzis	Efi Papageorgiou
2000	"Min Argeis" (Do not be late)	Min Argeis	Konstantinos Pantzis	Kostas Kapetanidis
2000	"Krata Ta Ola" (Hold them all)	Min Argeis	Konstantinos Pantzis	Kostas Kapetanidis
2001	"Afiste Minima" (Leave a message)	Afiste Minima	Eleni Giannatsoulia, Konstantinos Pantzis	Kostas Kapetanidis
2001	"Enas Katharos Egoismos / Aggeloudi Mou" (A Pure Egoism / My Angel)	Afiste Minima	Triantaphillos, Natalia Germanou / Thodoris Makridis, Eleni Giannatsoulia	Thanos Gomozias
2002	"Tha Se Perimeno" (I'll be waiting for you)	Gia Mena Eisai Esy	Takis Damaskhis	Voula Gogorosi
2006	"Hronia Se Perimena" (I have been waiting for you for years)	Live + 5 Studio	Triantaphillos, Vaggelis Kouzelis	Kostas Bakouris
2018	"Gyalini Kardia" (Glass Heart)	File, AAC Single	Giannis Fatouros	Leonidas Kechagias
2020	"Pame" (Let's go) .ft. Petros Imvrios	File, AAC Single	Ilias Philippou, Konstantinos Pantzis	Alex Constantinidis
2020	"Se Tentomeno Skhini" (In a Stretched Rope)	File, AAC Single	Vasilis Dimas, Konstantinos Pantzis	Alex Constantinidis
2022	"Se Perno Gia Na Sou Po" (I Pass You To Tell You)	File, AAC Single	Ilias Philippou, Konstantinos Pantzis	Mike Marzz
2023	"Argouses" (You Were Late)	File, AAC Single	Evi Droutsa, Triantaphillos	Alex Constantinidis

== Filmography ==
=== Television ===
Year	Title	Role	Notes	Channel
2014	Dancing with the Stars	Himself	Season 5 contestant 14th place	ANT1
2020	Just the 2 of Us	Himself	Season 4 contestant 14th place	Open
2021	Survivor Greece	Himself	Season 5 contestant	Skai
2023	kalokairi yes	Himself	Coach	Open

== Personal life ==
Triantaphillos first met his wife Dimitra Siambani at a cafe and they had a small traditional wedding at Lutra Ipati on 23 August 2014. The singer became a father to a son Nicolas at the age of 39.
