= Peggy Zina discography =

- Studio albums: 14
- Compilation albums: 2
- Singles: 3
- B-sides: 1

This page includes the discography of Greek contemporary laïka singer Peggy Zina. All of her albums have been released in Greece and Cyprus.

== Discography ==
=== Studio albums ===
All the albums listed underneath were released and charted in Greece.

Year	Title	Certification
1995	Peggy Zina	—
1998	Anevaines	—
2001	Ena Hadi	—
2002	Vres Enan Tropo	—
2003	Mazi Sou	Platinum
2004	Matono	Platinum
2005	Noima	Platinum
2006	Ena	Platinum
2007	Trekse	Platinum
2009	To Pathos Einai Aformi	2× Platinum
2010	Evaisthiti... I Logiki	2× Platinum
2012	Sou Hrostao Akoma Ena Klama	Platinum
2015	Para Polla	2× Platinum
2018	Ela	

=== CD singles ===
Year	Title	Certification
2000	"Ti Th' Akouso Akoma"	—
2002	"Love Is a Wonderful Thing"	Gold
2007	"To Mystiko"	—

=== Compilations ===
Year	Title	Certification	Ref.
2004	Ta Prota Chronia	Gold	
2008	Best of +	Gold	
