= Best of + =

Greatest hits album by Peggy Zina
- Released: June 24, 2008
- Recorded: 2001–2008
- Genres: Modern laika, pop, pop rock
- Length: 2:27:35
- Label: EMI/Minos

Peggy Zina chronology
Trekse (2007)	Best of + (2008)	To Pathos Einai Aformi (2009)

Peggy Zina compilation album chronology
Ta Prota Hronia (2005)	Best of + (2008)

Singles from Best of +
- 1. "Paradosou" Released: June 2008; 2. "To Kalokairi" Released: October 2008; 3. "Geia Sou" Released: December 16, 2008

Best of + is the second greatest hits compilation album by the Greek singer Peggy Zina, released in Greece and Cyprus on June 24, 2008, by Minos EMI on CD and in a CD and DVD package which includes her music videos. The album includes three new tracks composed and written by Giorgos Moukidis on the first disc, all three of which were released as singles.

== Track listing ==
=== Disc 1 ===
#	Title	English translation	Original album	Lyricist(s)	Composer(s)	Time
1.	"To Kalokairi"	"The Summer"	Previously unreleased	Giorgos Moukidis	Giorgos Moukidis	3:44
2.	"Geia Sou"	"Goodbye"	Previously unreleased	Giorgos Moukidis	Giorgos Moukidis	4:07
3.	"Paradosou"	"Surrender"	Previously unreleased	Giorgos Moukidis	Giorgos Moukidis	4:03
4.	"Ti Th' Akouso Akoma"	"What Else Will I Hear"	Ena Hadi	Ilias Filippou	Kyriakos Papadopoulos	3:22
5.	"Matono"	"I'm Bleeding"	Matono	Vasilis Giannopoulos	Christos Dantis	3:33
6.	"Pouthena" (Short Radio Version)	"Nowhere"	Matono	Giorgos Moukidis	Giorgos Moukidis	4:09
7.	"Eimai Kala"	"I'm Fine"	Mazi Sou	Stelios Hronis	Stelios Hronis	4:03
8.	"Noima"	"Meaning"	Noima	Giorgos Theofanous	Giorgos Theofanous	4:45
9.	"Ena Hadi"	"A Caress"	Ena Hadi	Ilias Filippou	Kyriakos Papadopoulos	3:57
10.	"To Teleftaio Potiraki (Live) (ft. Christos Dantis)"	"The Last Cup"	Ena (New Edition)	Christos Dantis	Christos Dantis	4:13
11.	"Tolmas Ki Eheis Parapono Esi"	"You Boldnesses and you have complaint, you?"	Vres Enan Tropo	Natalia Germanou	Petros Imvrios	3:31
12.	"Efyges"	"You Left"	Matono	Giorgos Moukidis	Giorgos Moukidis	3:58
13.	"Mi Rotate"	"Don't Ask"	Noima	Giorgos Theofanous	Giorgos Theofanous	4:33
14.	"Ena"	"One"	Ena	Vicky Gerothodorou	Takis Bougas	3:39
15.	"Zisame"	"We Lived"	Ena	Eleana Vrahali	Dimitris Kontopoulos	3:41
16.	"Trekse"	"Run"	Trekse	Eleana Vrahali	Christos Dantis	4:02
17.	"Mazi Sou"	"With You"	Mazi Sou	Giorgos Moukidis	Giorgos Moukidis	3:33
18.	"Ta Monopatia (ft. Kostas Karafotis)"	"The Paths"	Matono	Vicky Gerothodorou	Antonios Vardis	5:03
19.	"Mystiko"	"Secret"	Ena (New Edition)	Giorgos Moukidis	Giorgos Moukidis	5:44

=== Disc 2 ===
#	Title	English translation	Original album	Lyricist(s)	Composer(s)	Time
1.	"Dystihos"	"Unfortunately"	Mazi Sou	Giorgos Moukidis	Giorgos Moukidis	3:36
2.	"Sou To Orkizomai"	"Your Oath"	Noima	Giorgos Theoufanos	Giorgos Theofanous	3:47
3.	"Tin Agalia Sou Anoixe Mou"	"My embrace opened for you"	Mazi Sou	Kosmas	Alexi Sekou	3:50
4.	"To 'Ksera"	"I knew"	Ena	Vasilis Giannopoulos	Kyriakos Papadopoulos	4:01
5.	"Monaha Emena Na Rotas"	"Only Ask Me"	Matono	Giorgos Moukidis	Giorgos Moukidis	3:23
6.	"Eimaste Horia" (ft. Nikos Vertis)	"We're apart"	Mazi Sou/Poli Apotoma Vradiazei	Giorgos Moukidis	Giorgos Moukidis	4:39
7.	"Kai Pao Sta Skiladika"	"And go in house"	Vres Ena Tropo	Giannis Parios	Giannis Parios	4:07
8.	"Diokse Tin Pikra"	"Turn away bitterly"	Matono	Vasilis Giannopoulos	Hristoforos Germenis	4:08
9.	"De Hreiazetai"	"I don't need"	Matono	Giorgos Moukidis	Giorgos Moukidis	3:57
10.	"Ego Ta Spao"	"I break them"	Ena	Vasilis Giannopoulos	Kyriakos Papadopoulos	3:40
11.	"Kokkino Fili" (ft. Yiannis Parios)	"Red Kiss"	Ta Dueta Tou Erota	Yiannis Parios	Yiannis Parios	4:12
12.	"Sti Saloniki"	"In Saloniki"	Ena	Giorgos Moukidis	Giorgos Moukidis	4:03
13.	"Tis Monaxias Ta Monopatia"	"The loneliness paths"	Mazi Sou	Giorgos Moukidis	Giorgos Moukidis	3:37
14.	"Ta Matia Mou Rota"	"My eyes ask"	Vres Enan Tropo	Vangelis Kostantinidis	Kostantinos Pantzis	3:59
15.	"Eimai Edo"	"I'm Here"	Ena	Eleana Vrahali	Dimitris Kontopoulos	3:47
16.	"An Ipirhes Tha Se Horiza"	"If it existed you I would separate"	Trekse	Avgi Gavrilaki	Dimitris Paraskevopoulos	3:12
17.	"Ithaki"	"Ithaca"	Trekse	Eleana Vrahali	Nikos Antipas	2:59
18.	"Horis Gialo"	"Without You"	Mazi Sou	Giorgos Moukidis	Giorgos Moukidis	4:58

== Singles ==
"Paradosou"

"Paradosou" was released as a radio single several weeks before the release of the album and included a music video.

"To Kalokairi"

"To Kalokairi" is the second single released from the album in the format of a radio single and music video. It was released in October 2008.

"Geia Sou"

"Geia Sou", the last new song from the album, was released as the third single on December 16, 2008.

== Charts ==
The album peaked at number three on the Greek Albums Chart, and has since charted for a total of 16 weeks as of the week 9/2009 charts. By November, it had certified gold and the award was presented to Zina at a certification party at the Vox nightclub on December 3, 2008. At the party she sang many of her successful songs and spent time with her close friends and those in the music industry who had helped her.

Chart	Providers	Peak position	Weeks On Charts	Certification
Greek Albums Chart	IFPI	3	16	Gold
Cypriot Album Chart	Musical Paradise Top 10	3	9	—
