= Tropo =

Tropo may refer to:

- Tropospheric scatter, also known as tropo-scatter, a method of communicating with microwave radio signals over considerable distances
- Tropospheric propagation, electromagnetic propagation in relation to the troposphere
- TV and FM DX, long-distance reception of signals on the VHF frequency band, which can use tropospheric ducting
- Vres Enan Tropo, a 2002 studio album by Peggy Zina
