= Ta Prota Hronia =

Compilation album by Peggy Zina
- Released: December 1, 2005
- Genre: Modern laika
- Length: 1:19:03
- Label: Sony BMG

Peggy Zina chronology
Noima (2005)	Ta Prota Hronia (2005)	Ena (2006)

Ta Prota Hronia (Greek: Τα Πρώτα Χρόνια, lit. 'The First Years') is a compilation album by the popular Greek artist Peggy Zina. It was released in 2005 by Sony BMG Greece and includes the songs of her first two albums: Peggy Zina and Anevaines, which are part of the BMG Greece back catalogue.

== Track listing ==
1. "M'Ena Pseftiko Sougia" - 4:21
2. "Anevaines" - 3:18
3. "Sinnefiasmeni Kyriaki" - 4:26
4. "Psihi Mou Moni" - 3:19
5. "Den Eimai Tipota" - 2:59
6. "O Kaliteros Tropos" - 3:35
7. "Leme Leme" - 3:08
8. "Me Parakoloutheis" - 3:44
9. "Dikeologies" - 3:18
10. "Apomonothikes" - 3:13
11. "Μythos" - 3:17
12. "Alkionides Meres" - 4:27
13. "Den Boro Na Filiso Kanena" (Opos Filo Esena) - 3:17
14. "Mas Ta' Pan Ki Alli" - 3:05
15. "An Pas Me Alli" - 3:29
16. "Kai Kartero" - 3:59
17. "Kratise Me" - 3:34
18. "Hanomai" - 3:00
19. "Anisyho" - 3:52
20. "De Thelo Kouventes" - 3:30
21. "Prospoieisai" - 4:20
22. "Gyrises" - 4:01

== Charts ==
Chart	Provider	Peak position
Greek Albums Chart	IFPI	1
Cypriot Album Chart	All Records Top 20	1
