= Meres Pou De Sou Eipa S' Agapo =

Meres Pou De Sou Eipa S' Agapo Μέρες Που Δε Σου Είπα Σ' Αγαπώ

Studio album by Giorgos Sabanis
- Released: 4 May 2009
- Studio: C+C Studios
- Genres: Pop, pop rock
- Length: 35:53
- Label: Sony BMG Greece
- Producer: Yannis Doxas

Giorgos Sabanis chronology
Haramata (2008)	Meres Pou De Sou Eipa S' Agapo; Μέρες Που Δε Σου Είπα Σ' Αγαπώ (2009)	Mistirio Treno (2011)

Singles from Meres Pou De Sou Eipa S'agapo
- 1. "Ti Na Mas Kanei I Nihta" Released: 12 May 2009; 2. "Meres Pou De Sou Eipa S' Agapo" Released: 28 September 2009; 3. "Meres Pou De Sou Eipa S' Agapo (Remixed by MTV)" Released: 25 October 2009

Meres Pou De Sou Eipa S' Agapo (Greek: Μέρες Που Δε Σου Είπα Σ' Αγαπώ; English: Days I Didn't Tell You I Love You) is the second studio album by Greek singer Giorgos Sabanis, released on 04 May 2009 by Sony BMG Greece. The album contains 3 new songs and 6 songs from his first album Haramata. The songs "Meres Pou De Sou Eipa S' Agapo" and "Ti Na Mas Kanei I Nihta" were the most populars.

== Track listing ==
1. "Mia Zoi Tha 'mai Edo" (Μια Ζωή Θα 'μαι Εδώ; A Life Will Be Here) – 3:32
2. "Ti Na Mas Kanei I Nihta" Feat. Stereo Mike (Τι Να Μας Κάνει Η Νύχτα; What To Do In The Night) – 3:33
3. "Meres Pou De Sou Eipa S' Agapo" Duet with Rallia Hristidou (Μέρες Που Δε Σου Είπα Σ' Αγαπώ; Days I Didn't Tell You I Love You) – 3:20
4. "Meres Pou De Sou Eipa S' Agapo" (Remixed by MTV) Duet with Rallia Hristidou – 3:19

Bonus Tracks

1. "Ase Na Peftei I Vrohi" (Άσε Να Πέφτει Η Βροχή; Let The Rain Fall) – 3:44
2. "Haramata" (Χαράματα; Dawn) – 4:35
3. "Pathos" (Πάθος; Passion) – 3:45
4. "Kapou Allou Ki Ohi Edo" (Κάπου Αλλού Κι Όχι Εδώ; Somewhere Else And Not Here) – 3:10
5. "Mia Fora Ki Ena Kairo" (Μια Φορά Κι Ένα Καιρό; Once Upon a Time) - 3:45
6. "S' Afino Ston Epomeno" (Σ' Αφήνω Στον Επόμενο; Let's Go Next) – 3:11

== Personnel ==
- Yannis Doxas – executive producer
- Nikos Papadopoulos – photography
- Antonis Glikos – artwork
- Soumka – mastering
