= Logia Pou Kaine =

Logia Pou Kaine Λόγια Που Καίνε

Studio album by Giorgos Sabanis
- Released: 5 December 2016
- Studio: C+C Studios
- Genre: Pop, pop rock, electronica
- Length: 43:21
- Language: Greek
- Label: Cobalt Music
- Producer: Soumka

Giorgos Sabanis chronology
Mono Ex Epafis (2014)	Logia Pou Kaine; Λόγια Που Καίνε (2016)	Paraxena Demenoi (2019)

Singles from Logia Pou Kaine
- 1. "Se Sena Stamatise I Kardia" Released: 17 October 2016; 2. "Min Anisiheis" Released: 30 January 2017; 3. "Mono Esi" Released: 13 June 2017; 4. "Boreis Kai Heirotera" Released: 6 November 2017; 5. "Piso" Released: 23 March 2018; 6. "Logia Pou Kaine" Released: 5 June 2018

Logia Pou Kaine (Greek: Λόγια Που Καίνε; English: Words That Burn) is the title of the 6th studio album by Greek singer Giorgos Sabanis. The album released under the label Cobalt Music in Greece and Cyprus on 5 December 2016. The album went four times platinum, over-passing the number of 50,000 sales, and is the best selling album of Sabanis so far.

== Track listing ==
All lyrics are written by Eleana Vrahali; all music is composed by Giorgos Sabanis

No.	Title	Lyrics	Music	Length
1.	"Logia Pou Kaine" (Λόγια Που Καίνε; Words That Burn)	Eleana Vrahali	Giorgos Sabanis	4:17
2.	"Den Xehnao Ki As Ponao Otan Thimame" (Δεν Ξεχνάω Κι Ας Πονάω Όταν Θυμάμαι; I Don't Forget Or Let It Hurt When I Remember)	Eleana Vrahali	Giorgos Sabanis, Soumka	4:07
3.	"Dipla Sou" (Δίπλα Σου; Near You)	Eleana Vrahali	Giorgos Sabanis	4:11
4.	"Mono Esi" (Μόνο Εσύ; Only You)	Eleana Vrahali	Giorgos Sabanis	4:38
5.	"Min Anisiheis" (Μην Ανησυχείς; Don't Worry)	Eleana Vrahali	Giorgos Sabanis	4:29
6.	"Isos Pio Vathia Kopo" (Ίσως Πιο Βαθιά Κοπώ; Maybe A Deeper Cut)	Eleana Vrahali	Giorgos Sabanis	4:13
7.	"Piso" (Πίσω; Back)	Eleana Vrahali	Giorgos Sabanis	4:17
8.	"Erotas I Tipota" (Έρωτας Ή Τίποτα; Love or Nothing)	Eleana Vrahali	Giorgos Sabanis, Soumka	4:39
9.	"Vrahikikloma" (Βραχυκύκλωμα; Short Circuit)	Eleana Vrahali	Giorgos Sabanis	4:15
10.	"Vrohi" (Βροχή; Rain)	Eleana Vrahali	Giorgos Sabanis	4:15
Total length:				43:21

== Singles ==
"Isos Pio Vathia Kopo"

"Isos Pio Vathia Kopo" was the first single from the album, released on 17 October 2016. The video clip of the song was released on 19 December 2016.

"Min Anisiheis"

The second single was "Min Anisiheis", released on 30 January 2017 on all Greek radio stations.

"Mono Esi"

"Mono Esi" was the third single, released on 13 June 2017 with a video clip by Yiannis Papadakos.

"Den Xehnao Ki As Ponao Otan Thimame"

"Den Xehnao Ki As Ponao Otan Thimame" was the fourth single from the album. The music video clip was released on 6 November 2017.

"Piso"

The fifth single was the song "Piso", released on 23 March 2018. This was the last song with a video clip from the album.

"Logia Pou Kaine"

The title song was the sixth single, released as a digital single on 5 June 2018.

== Release history ==
Region	Date	Label	Format	Version
Greece	5 December 2016	Cobalt Music	CD, digital download	Original
Cyprus	5 December 2016	Cobalt Music	CD, digital download	Original

== Charts ==
The album was number one in the Greek Albums Chart, it was certified on 21 February 2018.

Chart	Providers	Peak position	Certification
Greek Albums Chart	IFPI	1	4× Platinum

== Personnel ==
- Soumka – executive producer, mixing
- Anestis Psaradakos – mastering
- Hristos Avdelas – guitar, bass, drums
- Dimitris Tsakoumis – creative director
- Foxdesign – artwork
- Krida – background vocals
- Dimitris Skoulas – photography
- Spiros Savvinos – styling
