= Mono Ex Epafis =

Mono Ex Epafis Μόνο Εξ Επαφής

Studio album by Giorgos Sabanis
- Released: 4 November 2014
- Studio: C+C Studios
- Genre: Pop, pop rock
- Length: 40:35 (Original); 48:28 (Platinum Edition)
- Label: Cobalt Music
- Producer: Soumka

Giorgos Sabanis chronology
Den Eimai Iroas (2012)	Mono Ex Epafis; Μόνο Εξ Επαφής (2014)	Logia Pou Kaine (2016)

Singles from Mono Ex Epafis
- 1. "Poion Agapas" Released: 9 June 2014; 2. "Kaneis Den Xerei" Released: 20 October 2014; 3. "Prin Peis S' Agapo" Released: 21 March 2015; 4. "Mono Ex Epafis" Released: 14 October 2015; 5. "Argises Poli" Released: 15 February 2016

Mono Ex Epafis (Greek: Μόνο Εξ Επαφής; English: Contact Only) is the title of the fifth studio album by Greek singer Giorgos Sabanis, released on 4 November 2014 by Cobalt Music in Greece and Cyprus, written entirely by Giorgos Sabanis and Eleana Vrahali.

== Track listing ==
Original
No.	Title	Lyrics	Music	Length
1.	"Mono Ex Epafis" (Μόνο Εξ Επαφής; Contact Only)	Eleana Vrahali	Giorgos Sabanis	3:55
2.	"Na 'Rtheis" (Να 'Ρθεις; You Should Come)	Eleana Vrahali	Giorgos Sabanis	4:04
3.	"Poion Agapas" (Ποιον Αγαπάς; Who Do You Love)	Eleana Vrahali	Giorgos Sabanis	4:16
4.	"Kaneis Den Xerei" (Κανείς Δεν Ξέρει; Nobody Knows)	Eleana Vrahali	Giorgos Sabanis	4:17
5.	"Kleidomenoi Dromoi" (Κλεισμένοι Δρόμοι; Closed Roads)	Eleana Vrahali	Giorgos Sabanis	4:06
6.	"Prin Peis S' Agapo" (Πριν Πεις Σ' Αγαπώ; Before You Say I Love You)	Eleana Vrahali	Giorgos Sabanis	3:40
7.	"Argises Poli" (Άργησες Πολύ; You Are Too Late)	Eleana Vrahali	Giorgos Sabanis	4:26
8.	"Oute Fili, Oute Zimia" (Ούτε Φιλί, Ούτε Ζημιά; Neither Kiss, Nor Damage)	Eleana Vrahali	Giorgos Sabanis	3:39
9.	"An Rotisei Kaneis" (Αν Ρωτήσει Κανείς; If You Ask Someone)	Eleana Vrahali	Giorgos Sabanis	4:30
10.	"Stin Palami Sou Epano" (Στην Παλάμη Σου Επάνω; In Your Palm Up)	Eleana Vrahali	Giorgos Sabanis	3:42
Total length:				40:35

Platinum Edition
No.	Title	Lyrics	Music	Length
11.	"Prin Peis S' Agapo (Remix by Teo Tzimas & Nikos Markoglou)"	Eleana Vrahali	Giorgos Sabanis	3:31
12.	"An Rotisei Kaneis (Remix by Soumka)"	Eleana Vrahali	Giorgos Sabanis	4:21
Total length:				7:53

== Singles ==
"Poion Agapas"

"Poion Agapas" was the first massive hit from the album, released on 9 June 2014 a digital single. A music video for the song was released on 27 June 2014.

"Kaneis Den Xerei"

The second single from the album is "Kaneis Den Xerei", released to Greek radio stations on 20 October 2014. The video clip of the song was presented on 13 November 2014.

"Prin Peis S' Agapo"

The third single is "Prin Peis S' Agapo". The video clip of the song was released on 21 March 2015. In summer 2016, Giorgos Sabanis won award for "Best Video Clip Pop/Rock" with the song at the MAD Video Music Awards 2016.

"Mono Ex Epafis"

The fourth single from the album is also the title of the album, "Mono Ex Epafis". The music video for the song was directed by Yiannis Papadakos.

"Argises Poli"

The fifth single was released to Greek radio stations on 15 February 2016. The official music video was presented on 13 April 2016.

== Release history ==
Region	Date	Label	Format	Version
Greece	4 November 2014	Cobalt Music	CD	Original release
Cyprus	4 November 2014	Cobalt Music	CD	Original release
Greece	22 July 2016	Cobalt Music	CD	Platinum Edition
Cyprus	22 July 2016	Cobalt Music	CD	Platinum Edition

== Charts ==
The album was number one in the Greek Albums Chart, it was certified Platinum on 17 December 2015.

Chart	Providers	Peak position	Certification
Greek Albums Chart	IFPI	1	Platinum

== Personnel ==
- Soumka – executive producer, mixing
- Paul Stefanidis – mastering
- Hristos Avdelas – guitar, bass, drums
- Dimitris Tsakoumis – creative director
- Andreas and Nico – photography
- Foxdesign – artwork
- Akis Deiximos – background vocals
- Krida – background vocals
