= Sou Hrostao Akoma Ena Klama =

Sou Hrostao Akoma Ena Klama Σου Χρωστάω Ακόμα Ένα Κλάμα

Studio album by Peggy Zina
- Released: 4 October 2012
- Genre: Contemporary laika, pop
- Length: 54:29
- Label: Minos EMI
- Producer: Nektarios Kokkinos

Peggy Zina chronology
Evaisthiti... I Logiki? (2010)	Sou Hrostao Akoma Ena Klama; Σου Χρωστάω Ακόμα Ένα Κλάμα (2012)	Para Polla (2015)

Singles from Sou Hrostao Akoma Ena Klama
- 1. "Eixa Pei Tha Figo" Released: 12 September 2011; 2. "Ego Tha Tragoudiso" Released: 4 December 2011; 3. "Sou Hrostao Akoma Ena Klama" Released: 3 March 2012; 4. "Ta 'Ho Me Mena" Released: 7 July 2012; 5. "Na Mi Mou Grafeis S' agapo" Released: 8 August 2012; 6. "Meine Edo Mazi Mou" Released: 10 September 2012

Sou Hrostao Akoma Ena Klama (Greek: Σου Χρωστάω Ακόμα Ένα Κλάμα; English: I owe you one more cry) is the twelfth studio album by the popular Greek artist Peggy Zina, released on 4 October 2012 by Minos EMI in Greece and Cyprus.

== Track listing ==
No.	Title	Lyrics	Music	Length
1.	"Na Mi Mou Grafeis S' agapo" (Να μή μου γράφεις σ' αγαπώ; Don't write I love you)	Giorgos Moukidis	Giorgos Moukidis	3:14
2.	"Ta 'Ho Me Mena" (Τα 'χω με μένα; I'm with myself)	Eleni Giannatsoulia	Giorgos Sabanis	3:28
3.	"Meine Edo Mazi Mou" (Μείνε εδώ μαζί μου; Stay here with me)	Vicki Gerothodorou	Dimos Anastasiadis	3:47
4.	"Tipota Den Emeine" (Τίποτα δεν έμεινε; Nothing remained)	Nikos Sarris	Christos Dantis	3:42
5.	"O, ti Thelei Kanei Panta I Kardia" (Ό, τι θέλει κάνει πάντα η καρδιά; The heart always does what it wants)	Vicki Gerothodorou	Akis Deiksimos	3:43
6.	"Paradinomai" (Παραδίνομαι; I surrender)	Eleni Giannatsoulia	Giorgos Sabanis	4:20
7.	"Tha Me Thimitheis" (Θα με θυμηθείς; You'll remember me)	Ilias Filippou	Kyriakos Papadopoulos	3:41
8.	"Ego Sta Leo" (Εγώ στα λέω; I've told you)	Ilias Filippou	Kyriakos Papadopoulos	3:56
9.	"Dilitirio" (Δηλητήριο; Poison)	Stelios Rokkos	Stelios Rokkos	3:49
10.	"De S' eho Anagki" (Δε σ' εχω ανάγκη; I don't need you)	Vicki Gerothodorou	Giorgos Sabanis	3:24
11.	"Oneiroparmeno Mou Kormi" (Ονειροπαρμένο μου κορμί; My dreamer body)	Stelios Rokkos	Stelios Rokkos	2:58

Bonus Tracks
No.	Title	Lyrics	Music	Length
12.	"Sou Hrostao Akoma Ena Klama" (Σου χρωστάω ακομα ένα κλάμα; I owe you one more cry)	Nikos Moraitis	Giorgos Sabanis	3:32
13.	"Ego Tha Tragoudiso" (Εγώ θα τραγουδήσω; I'll sing)	Nikos Moraitis	Giorgos Sabanis	3:32
14.	"Eixa Pei Tha Figo (Paris)" (Είχα πεί θα φύγω (Paris); I said I'll leave (Paris))	Nikos Moraitis	Amaia Montero, Xabi San Martin	3:47
15.	"Ti Monaksia Dikazo (Duet with Antonis Vardis)" (Τη μοναξιά δικάζω; I condemn loneliness)	Antonis Vardis	Antonis Vardis	3:47
Total length:				54:29

== Charts ==
Chart	Provider	Peak position	Certification
Greek Albums Chart	IFPI	3	Platinum
