= Anna Prelević =

Greek tv presenter and model

Anna Prelevic
- Born: Anna Prelevic; 28 April 1990 (age 36); Belgrade, SR Serbia, SFR Yugoslavia
- Height: 1.81 m (5 ft 11 in)
- Title: Miss Star Hellas 2010
- Parent(s): Branislav Prelević; Nevena Prelević-Marjanović
- Relatives: Tea Prelević (sister); Đorđe Marjanović (maternal grandfather); Doukissa Nomikou (sister-in-law)

Anna Prelević (Serbian Cyrillic: Ана Прелевић, Greek: Άννα Πρέλεβιτς, born 28 April 1990 in Belgrade, SFR Yugoslavia) is a Serbian-Greek TV host، model, entrepreneur and beauty pageant titleholder. In 2010 Prelevic was crowned Star Hellas. She is daughter of the former basketball player Branislav Prelević.

== Life ==
Prelevic was born on 28 April 1990 to former basketball player Branislav Prelević and Nevena Prelević-Marjanović, daughter of Serbian singer Đorđe Marjanović. She has a younger sister, Tea Prelevic (born 1992). She was born in Belgrade but grew up in Thessaloniki. In 1996, when her father signed with Virtus Bologna, they moved to Bologna but after one season, her father signed a contract with AEK BC and so they moved to Athens, Greece. Although her father left the club after two seasons and played again for PAOK BC, she spent the next years of her life in Athens.

At the age of 18, Prelevic moved to UK to study Media Communication at the Goldsmiths, University of London. After three years she graduated in 2010 and moved back to Greece. She participated in the election for Miss Greece and she was elected Miss Greece 2010 and so she represented Greece at the Miss Universe 2010.
Anna speaks five languages: Greek, Serbian, English, Italian and Russian.

== Personal life ==
From 2007 to 2013, Prelevic had been in a relationship with Greek basketball player Dimitrios Charitopoulos. From 2014 to 2016, Prelevic had been in a relationship with Greek singer Giorgos Sabanis. From 2017 to 2020, Prelevic had been in a relationship with Greek basketball player Ioannis Papapetrou.
In 2021, Prelevic began dating Nikitas Nomikos, who is Doukissa Nomikou's older brother. The couple got married on May 27, 2023 and on April 23, 2026, Prelevic gave birth to twin daughters.

== Filmography ==
Television
Year	Title	Role	Notes
2010	ANT1's Beauty Pageant	Herself	Contestant; Star Hellas
2012–2013	Eksypni Zoi	Herself	Hostess
2013	EuroSong 2013	Herself	Reporter
2014–2015	Join Us	Herself	Co-Hostess
2018	Eksypni Zoi	Herself	Hostess
2018-2020	Ela Xamogela	Herself	Reporter
2021	I Teleia Apodrasi	Herself	Co-Hostess
