= Den Eimai Iroas =

Den Eimai Iroas Δεν Είμαι Ήρωας

Studio album by Giorgos Sabanis
- Released: 1 November 2012
- Studio: C+C Studios
- Genre: Pop, pop rock, electronica
- Length: 40:09
- Label: Cobalt Music
- Producer: Soumka

Giorgos Sabanis chronology
| Mistirio Treno (2011) | Den Eimai Iroas; Δεν Είμαι Ήρωας (2012) | Mono Ex Epafis (2014) |

Singles from Den Eimai Iroas
- 1. "Mono An Thes Emena" Released: 12 June 2012; 2. "Ora Miden" Released: 10 October 2012; 3. "O,ti Kai Na Eimai" Released: 18 February 2013; 4. "Den Eimai Iroas" Released: 20 May 2013; 5. "Mi Milas" Released: 7 October 2013

Den Eimai Iroas (Greek: Δεν Είμαι Ήρωας; English: I'm Not a Hero) is the fourth studio album by Greek singer Giorgos Sabanis, released on 1 November 2012 by Cobalt Music in Greece and Cyprus, written entirely by Giorgos Sabanis and Eleana Vrahali.

== Track listing ==
| No. | Title | Lyrics | Music | Length |
|---|---|---|---|---|
| 1. | "Ora Miden" (Ώρα Μηδέν; It's Time) | Eleana Vrahali | Giorgos Sabanis | 4:08 |
| 2. | "Mono An Thes Emena" (Μόνο Αν Θες Εμένα; Only If You Want Me) | Eleana Vrahali | Giorgos Sabanis | 4:05 |
| 3. | "Den Eimai Iroas" (Δεν Είμαι Ήρωας; I'm Not a Hero) | Eleana Vrahali | Giorgos Sabanis | 3:23 |
| 4. | "Mi Milas" (Μη Μιλάς; Don't Talk) | Eleana Vrahali | Giorgos Sabanis | 4:29 |
| 5. | "Nihta Ki Alli Nihta" (Νύχτα Κι Άλλη Νύχτα; Night And Another Night) | Eleana Vrahali | Giorgos Sabanis | 4:14 |
| 6. | "Kokkino" (Κόκκινο; Red) | Eleana Vrahali | Giorgos Sabanis | 4:16 |
| 7. | "San Ki Esena" (Σαν Κι Εσένα; Like You) | Eleana Vrahali | Giorgos Sabanis | 3:51 |
| 8. | "O,ti Kai Na Eimai" (Ό,Τι Και Να Είμαι; Whatever I'm) | Eleana Vrahali | Giorgos Sabanis | 4:06 |
| 9. | "Afta Pou Eihes Taxei" (Αυτά Που Είχες Τάξει; What You Had Ordered) | Eleana Vrahali | Giorgos Sabanis | 3:57 |
| 10. | "Ego Pou S' Agapao" (Εγώ Που Σ’Αγαπάω; I Love You) | Eleana Vrahali | Giorgos Sabanis | 3:40 |
| Total length: | | | | 40:09 |

== Singles ==
"Mono An Thes Emena"

"Mono An Thes Emena" was the first single from the album. A music video for the song was released on 5 July 2012.

"Ora Miden"

"Ora Miden" was the second single from the album, released on 10 October 2012 with video clip. Sabanis won award for "Best Video Clip Pop/Rock" with the song at the MAD Video Music Awards 2013.

"O,ti Kai Na Eimai"

The third single was "O,ti Kai Na Eimai". The video vlip of the song was released on 18 February 2013.

"Den Eimai Iroas"

"Den Eimai Iroas" was released to Greek radios on 20 May 2013.

"Mi Milas"

The last single from the album was released with video clip on 7 October 2013.

== Release history ==
| Region | Date | Label | Format | Version |
|---|---|---|---|---|
| Greece | 1 November 2012 | Cobalt Music | CD | Original |
| Cyprus | 1 November 2012 | Cobalt Music | CD | Original |

== Charts ==
"Den Eimai Iroas" is the first certified album of Giorgos Sabanis. The album was announced Gold in Greece and Cyprus.

| Chart | Providers | Peak position | Certification |
|---|---|---|---|
| Greek Albums Chart | IFPI | 5 | Gold |
| Cypriot Albums Chart | All Records Top 10 | 4 | Gold |

== Personnel ==
- Soumka – executive producer, mixing
- Vaggelis Kiris – photography
- Konstantinos Georgantas – artwork
- Paul Stefanidis – mastering engineer
- Hristos Avdelas – guitar, bass, drums
- Dimitris Tsakoumis – creative director
- Stelios Stylianou – styling
- Alex Panagi – background vocals
- Krida – background vocals
- Dimos Beke – background vocals
