= Haramata =

Haramata Χαράματα

Studio album by Giorgos Sabanis
- Released: 21 March 2008
- Studio: C+C Studios
- Genre: Pop, pop rock, electronica
- Length: 49:10
- Label: Sony BMG Greece
- Producer: Yannis Doxas

Giorgos Sabanis chronology
Haramata; Χαράματα (2008)	Meres Pou De Sou Eipa S' Agapo (2009)

Singles from Haramata
- 1. "S' Afino Ston Epomeno" Released: 18 October 2007; 2. "Haramata" Released: 7 March 2008; 3. "Moirasia" Released: 9 September 2008

Haramata (Greek: Χαράματα; English: Dawn) is the first studio album by Greek singer Giorgos Sabanis, released on 21 March 2008 by Sony BMG Greece. All the music on the album was written by Sabanis.

== Track listing ==
1. "S' Afino Ston Epomeno" (Σ' Αφήνω Στον Επόμενο; Let's Go Next) – 3:11
2. "Haramata" (Χαράματα; Dawn) – 4:35
3. "Pathos" (Πάθος; Passion) – 3:45
4. "Moirasia" (Duet with Christos Dantis), (Μοιρασιά; Shares) – 3:25
5. "Dio Nisia" (Δυο Νησιά; Two Islands) – 4:10
6. "O Mavros Panthiras" (Ο Μαύρος Πάνθηρας; The Black Panther) – 3:25
7. "Mia Fora Ki Ena Kairo" (Μια Φορά Κι Ένα Καιρό; Once Upon a Time) – 3:45
8. "San Trelos Rithmos" ( Σαν Τρελός Ρυθμός; Like a Crazy Rhythm) – 4:40
9. "(Panta Na Afineis) Ena Fos Anoihto" (Πάντα Να Αφήνεις; Always Leave Me), (Ένα Φως Ανοιχτό; A Light Open") – 2:30
10. "Kapou Allou Ki Ohi Edo" (Κάπου Αλλού Κι Όχι Εδώ; Somewhere Else And Not Here) – 3:10
11. "O Ipnos Malose Me To Mialo" (Ο Ύπνος Μάλωσε Με Το Μυαλό; Sleep Suffered By The Mind) – 4:17
12. "Ase Na Peftei I Vrohi" (Άσε Να Πέφτει Η Βροχή; Let The Rain Fall) – 3:44
13. "Pathos (La Passione Remix)" – 4:35

== Personnel ==
- Yannis Doxas – executive producer
- Kostas Drimtzias – photography
- Dimitris Rekouniotis – artwork
- Vasilis Tsouparopoulos – mastering
- Kostas Zisis – styling
