= Love Is a Wonderful Thing (Peggy Zina song) =

Single by Peggy Zina

from the album Vres Enan Tropo
- Released: March 2002
- Recorded: Studio 111; The Workshop Sound Lab
- Genre: Pop, Modern Laïka
- Length: 3:00
- Label: Nitro Music
- Songwriter: Thanos Kalliris

Peggy Zina singles chronology
| "Ti Th' Akouso Akoma" (2000) | "Love Is a Wonderful Thing" (2002) | "Mystiko" (2007) |

"Love Is a Wonderful Thing" is a song by popular Greek artist Peggy Zina. It was released in March 2002 by Nitro Music and is included on her album Vres Enan Tropo. The song was written by Thanos Kalliris and was released as a three track CD single which received gold certification.

== Eurovision Song Contest 2002 ==
"Love Is a Wonderful Thing" was entered in the Greek national final to choose the song and artist to represent Greece in the Eurovision Song Contest 2002. The national final was held on 26 February 2002 at Rex music hall in Athens where Zina performed the song sixth. Out of the ten songs entered, an expert jury chose 5 to go onto the final round. In the final round, the winner was chosen by 50% televoting and 50% expert jury. "Love Is a Wonderful Thing" tied for second place with Maria-Louiza & Not 4 Sale's "To Be Together" and Michalis Rakintzis's "S.A.G.A.P.O." won the contest and represented Greece at the contest where it came in 17th.

== Track listing ==
1. "Love Is a Wonderful Thing" (Original Version) – 3:00
2. "Love Is a Wonderful Thing" (Positive Energy Remix) – 4:34
3. "Ena Hadi" (Dance Mix) (Ένα χάδι; A caress) – 5:18

== Personnel ==
- Ahilleas Haritos – make-up
- Alex Panagi – backing vocalist
- Alexia Georgiadou – hair
- Antonis Gounaris – keyboard, programmer
- Dimitris Horianopoulos – mixing
- Dimitris Paizis – keyboard, programmer
- Dimitris Svarts – wardrobe styling
- Dinos Diamantopoulos – photographer
- Marianna Oikonomou – backing vocalist
- Socrates Soumelas – mixer
- Thanos Kalliris – backing vocalist, executive producer, keyboard, mixer

== Charts ==
| Chart (2002) | Peak position |
|---|---|
| Greek Single Charts | 2 |
