= Mazi Sou (album) =

Studio album by Peggy Zina
- Released: May 9, 2003 (Greece)
- Genre: Modern laika
- Length: 1:04:38 (Original release); 1:16:39 (re-release)
- Label: Minos EMI
- Producer: Dimitra Teranova

Peggy Zina chronology
Vres Enan Tropo (2002)	Mazi Sou (2003)	Matono (2004)

Singles from Mazi sou
- 1. "Mazi Sou" Released: April 26, 2003; 2. "Eimai Kala" Released: June 7, 2003; 3. "Distihos" Released: August 12, 2003; 4. "Eimaste Horia" Released: October 22, 2003; 5. "Hanomaste" Released: October 22, 2003; 6. "Den Axizeis" Released: January 31, 2004

Mazi Sou (Greek: Μαζί σου; English: With You) is the title of the fifth studio album by the popular Greek artist Peggy Zina. It was released on May 9, 2003, and is her first album with Minos EMI. Following the album's platinum certification, it was re-released with three additional tracks, two of which feature Nikos Vertis. Mazi Sou was Zina's first album to achieve a certification after seven years in the music industry.

== Track listing ==
No.	Title	Lyrics	Music	Length
1.	"Mazi Sou" (Mαζί σου; With you)	George Moukidis	Giorgos Moukidis	3:35
2.	"Alli Mia Vradia" (Άλλη μια βραδιά; One more evening)	Ilias Filippou	Kyriakos Papadopoulos	4:07
3.	"Eimai Kala" (Είμαι καλά; I'm Fine)	Stelios Hronis	Stelios Hronis	4:02
4.	"Distihos" (Δυστυχώς; Unfortunately)	Giorgos Moukidis	Giorgos Moukidis	3:32
5.	"Ti Kalo Mou Kaneis" (Τι καλό μου κάνεις; What good are you)	Ilias Filippou	Kyriakos Papadopoulos	3:12
6.	"Siga Ton Antra" (Σιγά τον άντρα; Worthless man)	Eyis Droytsa	Giorgos Kafedjopoulou	4:13
7.	"Tha Se Ksanavro" (Θα σε ξαναβρώ; I will find you again)	Ilias Filippou	Kyriakos Papadopoulos	3:40
8.	"Tis Monaxias Ta Monopatia" (Της μοναξιάς τα μονοπάτια' The paths of loneliness)	Giorgos Moukidis	Giorgos Moukidis	3:36
9.	"Gia Na To Les" (Για να το λες; If you say so)	Ilias Filippou	Kyriakos Papadopoulos	3:38
10.	"S'Agapisa Poli" (Σ' αγάπησα πολύ; I loved you very much)	Ilias Filippou	Kyriakos Papadopoulos	3:58
11.	"Kardia Apo Sidero Ftiagmeni" (Καρδιά από σίδερο φτιαγμένη; Heart made of metal)	Stelios Hronis	Stelios Hronis	3:50
12.	"Edo Kai Tora" (Εδώ και τώρα; Here and now)	Petros Imvrios	Petros Imvrios	3:00
13.	"Senaria" (Σενάρια; Scenarios)	Alexi Sekou	Alexi Sekou	4:02
14.	"Kormi Gia Filima" (Κορμί για φίλημα; Body for kissing)	Giorgos Moukidis	Giotgos Moukidis	3:56
15.	"Tin Agalia Sou Anoixe Mou" (Την αγκαλιά σου άνοιξέ μου; Open your arms for me)	Kosmas	ALexi Sekou	3:50
16.	"An M'Agapas" (Αν μ' αγαπάς; If you love me)	Giorgos Moukidis	Giorgos Moukidis	3:40
17.	"Horis Gialo" (Χωρίς γυαλό; Without a coast)	Giorgos Moukidis	Giorgos Moukidis	4:55
18.	"Eimaste Horia (ft Nikos Vertis)" (Είμαστε χώρια; We're apart)	Giorgos Moukidis	Giorgos Moukidis	4:40
19.	"Hanomaste (ft Nikos Vertis)" (Χανόμαστε; We're getting lost)	Panos Falaras	Kostas Miliotakis	3:23
20.	"Den Aksizeis" (Δεν αξίζεις; You're not worth it)	Natalia Germanou & Sokratis Soumelas	Tarkan & Jeffrey Coplan	3:59

== Charts ==
Chart	Provider	Peak position	Certification
Greek Albums Chart	IFPI	1	Platinum
Cypriot Album Chart	All Records Top 20	1	Gold
