= Paraxena Demenoi =

Paraxena Demenoi Παράξενα Δεμένοι

Studio album by Giorgos Sabanis
- Released: 1 April 2019
- Studio: C&C Studios
- Genre: Pop, pop rock, sentimental ballad
- Length: 47:53
- Language: Greek
- Label: Cobalt Music
- Producer: Soumka

Giorgos Sabanis chronology
Logia Pou Kaine (2016)	Paraxena Demenoi; Παράξενα Δεμένοι (2019)

Singles from Paraxena Demenoi
- 1. "Skia Sti Gi" Released: 12 January 2018; 2. "Ftaiei" Released: 8 November 2018; 3. "Epilogi" Released: 14 March 2019; 4. "M'Ena Sou Vlemma" Released: 1 August 2019; 5. "Allaxe Ta Ola" Released: 16 January 2020; 6. "Agria Thalassa" Released: 24 June 2020

Paraxena Demenoi (Greek: Παράξενα Δεμένοι; English: Strange Tied) is the title of the seventh studio album by Greek singer Giorgos Sabanis, released in 2019 by Cobalt Music in Greece and Cyprus.

== Track listing ==
All lyrics are written by Eleana Vrahali; all music is composed by Giorgos Sabanis.

No.	Title	Lyrics	Music	Length
1.	"M'Ena Sou Vlemma" (Μ' Ένα Σου Βλέμμα; One Your Look)	Eleana Vrahali	Giorgos Sabanis	4:20
2.	"Epilogi" (Επιλογή; Choice)	Eleana Vrahali	Giorgos Sabanis	4:27
3.	"Oi Pliges Mou" (Οι Πληγές Μου; My Wounds)	Eleana Vrahali	Giorgos Sabanis, Soumka	4:53
4.	"Paraxena Demenoi" (Παράξενα Δεμένοι; Strange Tied)	Eleana Vrahali	Giorgos Sabanis	4:27
5.	"Matia Mou" (Μάτια Μου; My Eyes)	Eleana Vrahali	Giorgos Sabanis	4:10
6.	"Allaxe Ta Ola" (Άλλαξε Τα Όλα; He Changed Everything)	Eleana Vrahali	Giorgos Sabanis, Soumka	4:03
7.	"Hamila" (Χαμηλά; Low)	Eleana Vrahali	Giorgos Sabanis	4:31
8.	"Ftaiei" (Φταίει; Fault)	Eleana Vrahali	Giorgos Sabanis	4:10
9.	"Ti Eisai Gia Mena" (Τι Είσαι Για Μένα; What Are You For Me?)	Eleana Vrahali	Giorgos Sabanis	4:38
10.	"Irthes Gia Na Meineis" (Ήρθες Για Να Μείνεις; You Come To Stay)	Eleana Vrahali	Giorgos Sabanis	4:36
11.	"Skia Sti Gi" (Σκιά Στη Γη; Shadow On Earth)	Eleana Vrahali	Giorgos Sabanis	3:38
Total length:				47:53

2020 Bonus Track
No.	Title	Lyrics	Music	Length
12.	"Agria Thalassa" (Άγρια Θάλασσα; Wild Sea)	Eleana Vrahali	Giorgos Sabanis	4:21
Total length:				4:21

== Music videos ==
- "Skia Sti Gi"
- "Ftaiei"
- "Epilogi"
- "M'Ena Sou Vlemma"
- "Allaxe Ta Ola"
- "Agria Thalassa"

== Release history ==
Region	Date	Label	Format	Version
Greece	1 April 2019	Cobalt Music	CD, digital download	Original
Cyprus	1 April 2019	Cobalt Music	CD, digital download	Original

== Charts ==
Chart	Providers	Peak position	Certification
Greek Albums Chart	IFPI	1	4× Platinum

== Personnel ==
- Soumka – executive producer, mixing
- Anestis Psaradakos – mastering
- Hristos Avdelas – guitar, bass, drums
- Foxdesign – artwork
- Krida – background vocals
- Panos Giannakopoulos – photography
