= Giorgos Sabanis =

Greek singer

Giorgos Sabanis Γιώργος Σαμπάνης
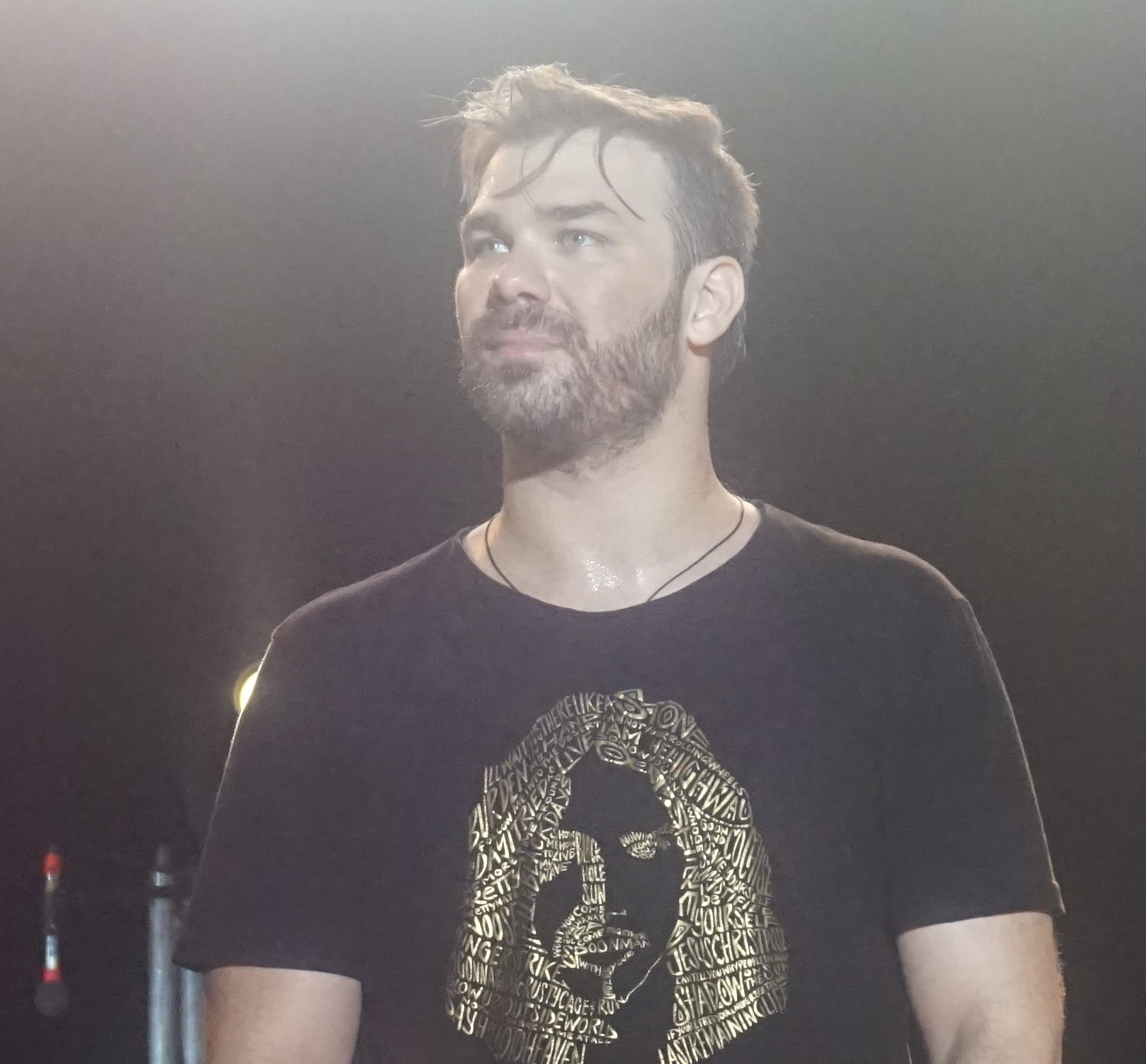
- Giorgos Sabanis

Background information
- Born: 15 May 1983 (age 42); Athens, Greece
- Genres: Pop; Pop rock
- Occupations: Singer; songwriter; athlete
- Instruments: Vocals; guitar
- Years active: 2007–present
- Labels: Sony BMG (2007–2011) Cobalt Music (2011–present)

Giorgos Sabanis (Greek: Γιώργος Σαμπάνης, born 15 May 1983) is a Greek singer-songwriter and athlete. He was the runner in the segment honouring of all previous Olympiads, at the 2004 Summer Olympics opening ceremony. Giorgos Sabanis is an athletics national champion at 100 m, with 14 Pan-Hellenic gold medals and other individual distinctions. After leaving his career as an athlete, he became one of the most famous Greek performers.

== Biography ==
=== Early years ===
Giorgos Sabanis was born and raised in Athens, Greece. He has three siblings. His parents divorced when he was only six years old. As a teenager, Sabanis was mostly listening to rock bands of the 1960s and 1970s, and bands of British and American legends. His greatest musical idol is Giorgos Dalaras. At an early age, Giorgos occupied with the track and field. He started playing music when he was 13 years old and created a band called "Fasma". They were singing and writing songs, one of them was "To Fili Tis Zois" which was performed by Helena Paparizou many years later. Giorgos studied playing guitar in a musical school, in Athens.

=== Athlete career ===
Giorgos Sabanis appeared at the 2004 Summer Olympics opening ceremony carrying a flag with an image of an olive branch symbolising not only peace, but Athens itself, lapped around the stadium, symbolically crossing tape dedicated to the previous 27 Olympiads. He even symbolically stumbled and stopped for the 1916, 1940, and 1944 Games which were cancelled due to world wars. He ended his run at the very centre of the stadium, where Gianna Angelopoulos-Daskalaki and Jacques Rogge were under the olive tree, symbolising the Olympic's current journey, from Athens to Athens.

=== Music career ===
In October 2007, Sabanis recorded his first CD single "Kapou Allou" ("Somewhere Else") which consists of four tracks including his first success "S' Afino Tora Ston Epomeno" ("I Leave You to the Next"). In March 2008, he presented his first full album titled Haramata ("Dawn"). All of his songs are written by him, while Spyros Lambros' children choir contributed in one of Sampanis' first songs "Ena Fos Anoihto" ("A Light Open"). That same years he composed several songs for the album Vrisko To Logo Na Zo for Paparizou's. In May 2009, he released his second album, while at the same time he made his first live appearances with Peggy Zina. He composed 9 songs for Peggy's album To Pathos Einai Aformi and became professionally conscious with the lyricist Eleana Vrahali. Giorgos Sabanis has stated in one of his rare interviews:

I do not make music to sell discs, I make music out of necessity.

Since 2011, he has a contract with the music label Cobalt Music. On 24 March 2011 was released the album Mistirio Treno (Mysterious Train"). Most popular was the songs "San To Fillo Ston Aera" ("Like the Leaf in the Wind"), "Ston Mation Sou To Gkrizo" ("In the Gray of Your Eyes"), "To Kalokairi Afto" ("This Summer"), "Mistirio Treno" and "Makria Gia Na Zo" ("Long As Long as I Live").

In autumn 2012 Sabanis released the album Den Eimai Iroas ("I'm Not a Hero). The album is full of massive hits – "Ora Miden" ("Hour 0"), "Mono An Thes Emena" ("Only If You Want Me"), "Mi Milas" ("Don't Talk"), "O,ti Kai Na Eimai" ("Whatever I am") and "Den Eimai Iroas".

In June 2013 "Den Eimai Iroas" was certified gold. A week later he won the award for "Best Video Clip Pop/Rock" with the song "Ora Miden" at the MAD Video Music Awards 2013. Parallel with his songs, Sabanis makes songs for many other popular singers Despina Vandi, Nikos Oikonomopoulos, Katy Garbi, Antonis Remos and Peggy Zina.

In 2014 Sabanis released his fifth studio album Mono Ex Epafis ("Only Without Contact"). This is the first album to have platinum sales. In 2016 Giorgos Sabanis won for second time the award for "Best Video Clip Pop/Rock" with the song "Prin Peis S'Agapo" ("Before You Say I Love You") at the MAD Video Music Awards 2016.

The great success of the Sabanis comes in 2016 with the album Logia Pou Kaine ("Words That Burn"). The album was certified four times platinum with sold 50,000 copies. Giorgos Sabanis released his latest studio album on 1 April 2019, called Paraxena Demenoi ("Strangely Intertwined").

== Personal life ==
From 2014 to 2016, Sabanis had been in a relationship with Serbian-Greek model Anna Prelevic, who is Bane Prelevic's daughter. Since 2022, Sabanis has been in relationship with Greek model Ioanna Sarri.

== Discography ==
=== Studio albums ===
- Haramata (2008)
- Meres Pou De Sou Eipa S' Agapo (2009)
- Mistirio Treno (2011)
- Den Eimai Iroas (2012)
- Mono Ex Epafis (2014)
- Logia Pou Kaine (2016)
- Paraxena Demenoi (2019)

=== CD singles ===
- Kapou Allou (2007)
