= Mistirio Treno =

Mistirio Treno Μυστήριο Τρένο

Studio album by Giorgos Sabanis
- Released: 24 March 2011
- Studio: C+C Studios
- Genre: Pop, pop rock, electronica
- Length: 38:11
- Label: Cobalt Music
- Producer: Giorgos Sabanis

Giorgos Sabanis chronology
Meres Pou De Sou Eipa S' Agapo (2009)	Mistirio Treno; Μυστήριο Τρένο (2011)	Den Eimai Iroas (2012)

Singles from Mistirio Treno
- 1. "Ston Mation Sou To Gkrizo" Released: 25 May 2010; 2. "Makria Gia Oso Zo" Released: 26 September 2010; 3. "Mistirio Treno" Released: 22 March 2011; 4. "To Kalokairi Afto (Ston Ourano)" Released: 12 August 2011; 5. "San To Fillo Ston Aera" Released: 23 November 2011

Mistirio Treno (Greek: Μυστήριο Τρένο; English: Mystery Train) is the third studio album by Greek singer Giorgos Sabanis, which was released on 24 March 2011 and is his first album with Cobalt Music. All the music on the album is done by Sabanis.

== Track listing ==
No.	Title	Lyrics	Music	Length
1.	"Mistirio Treno" (Μυστήριο Τρένο; Mystery Train)	Eleana Vrahali	Giorgos Sabanis	4:00
2.	"Eftihos Pou Iparheis" (Ευτυχώς Που Υπάρχεις; Thank God You Exist)	Eleana Vrahali	Giorgos Sabanis	3:43
3.	"To Kalokairi Afto (Ston Ourano) Feat. Professional Sinnerz" (Το Καλοκαίρι Αυτό (Στον Ουρανό); This Summer (In Heaven))	Adamantas, Thanos Papanikolaou	Giorgos Sabanis	3:46
4.	"San To Fillo Ston Aera" (Σαν Το Φύλλο Στον Αέρα; As A Feather in the Wind)	Dimitris Fakos	Giorgos Sabanis	4:19
5.	"Rosiki Rouleta" (Ρώσικη Ρουλέτα; Russian Roulette)	Thanos Papanikolaou	Giorgos Sabanis	3:28
6.	"Akindini Agkalia Feat. Despina Olimpiou" (Ακινδύνη Αγκαλιά; Anxiety Embrace)	Thanos Papanikolaou	Giorgos Sabanis	3:51
7.	"O Stohos Eimai Ego" (Ο Στόχος Είμαι Εγώ; The Goal I'm)	Thanos Papanikolaou	Giorgos Sabanis	4:14
8.	"Makria Gia Oso Zo" (Μακριά Για Όσο Ζω; Long As Long As I Live)	Thanos Papanikolaou	Giorgos Sabanis	3:57
9.	"Ston Mation Sou To Gkrizo" (Στών Ματιών Σου Το Γκρίζο; On Your Eyes The Gray)	Eleana Vrahali	Giorgos Sabanis	3:27
10.	"Metaxi Mas" (Μεταξύ Μας; Between Us)	Giorgos Sabanis	Giorgos Sabanis	3:26
Total length:				38:11

== Music videos ==
- "Ston Mation Sou To Gkrizo"
- "Makria Gia Oso Zo"
- "To Kalokairi Afto (Ston Ourano) "
- "San To Fillo Ston Aera"

== Personnel ==
- Giorgos Sabanis – executive producer
- Giorgos Kalfamanolis – photography
- Antonis Kapiris – artwork
- Soumka – mixing
- Paul Stefanidis – mastering engineer
- Hristos Avdelas – guitar, bass, drums
- Sotiris Tsagdis – styling
- Kostas Doxas – background vocals
- Despina Olimpiou – background vocals
- Thanos Papanikolaou – background vocals
