= Trekse =

Studio album by Peggy Zina
- Released: December 4, 2007
- Genre: Modern laika
- Length: 53:25
- Language: Greek
- Label: EMI/Minos
- Producer: Ilias Benetos

Peggy Zina chronology
Ena (2006)	Trekse (2007)	Best of + (2008)

Peggy Zina studio album chronology
Ena (2006)	Trekse (2007)	To Pathos Einai Aformi (2009)

Singles from Trekse
- 1. "An Ipirhes Tha Se Horiza" Released: September 13, 2007; 2. "Trekse" Released: October 31, 2007; 3. "Dio Kseni" Released: January 20, 2008; 4. "Kai Meta" Released: January 20, 2008

Trekse (Greek: Τρέξε; English: Run) is the ninth studio album by the Greek singer Peggy Zina, released on 4 December 2007, by Minos EMI. The album achieved Gold certification from its first week and made entered the Greek Albums Chart at number two.

== Track listing ==
No.	Title	Lyrics	Music	Length
1.	"Siga-Siga" (Σιγά-σιγά; Slowly-Slowly)	Giorgos Moukidis	Giorgos Moukidis	3:45
2.	"Trekse" (Τρέξε; Run)	Eleana Vrahali	Christos Dantis	4:02
3.	"Kai Meta" (Και μετά; And Then?)	Giorgos Moukidis	Giorgos Moukidis	3:50
4.	"Na'rtheis" (Να 'ρθεις; You Should Come)	Giorgos Moukidis	Giorgos Moukidis	4:12
5.	"An Kati Mas Simvei" (Αν κάτι μας συμβεί; If Something Happens To Us)	Eleana Vrahali	Nikos Antypas	3:45
6.	"Horevo" (Χορεύω; I'm Dancing)	Eleana Vrahali	Takis Bougas	4:01
7.	"Efiga" (Έφυγα; I Left)	Kostas Balahoutis	Athanasios Vasilas	2:59
8.	"Oute Na To Skefteis" (Ούτε να το σκεφτείς; Don't Even Think Of It)	Dimitris Tsafas	Christos Dantis	2:40
9.	"Ase Me Ston Kosmo Mou" (Άσε με στον κόσμο μου; Leave Me In My World)	Eleana Vrahali	Christos Dantis	2:41
10.	"Dio Kseni" (Δυο ξένοι; Two Strangers)	Giorgos Moukidis	Giorgos Moukidis	3:00
11.	"Alli Mia Fora" (Άλλη μια φορά; One More Time)	Viki Gerothodorou	Dimitris Kontopoulos	3:40
12.	"An Ipirhes Tha Se Horiza" (Αν υπήρχες θα σε χώριζα; If You Existed, I'd Break Up With You)	Avgi Gavrilaki	Dimitris Paraskevopoulos	3:14
13.	"Den Paradinoma" (Δεν παραδίνομαι; I Won't Surrender)	Eleana Vrahali	Takis Bougas	4:14
14.	"Ston Ourano" (Στον ουρανό; In The sky)	Giorgos Moukidis	Giorgos Moukidis	4:30
15.	"Ithaki" (Ιθάκη; Ithaca)	Eleana Vrahali	Nikos Antypas	2:58

== Chart performance ==
The album achieved Gold certification from its first week and entered the Greek Albums Chart at #2, behind Mihalis Hatzigiannis's live album. The album certified platinum in its sixth week on the chart and Zina received the platinum certification on January 22, 2008. In its seventh week, the album disappeared from the chart before re-entering at number 47 and one week later going up to number 27. The album was placed seventh in the IFPI annual albums chart for 2007.

Chart	Provider	Peak position	Certification
Greek Albums Chart	IFPI	2	Platinum
