= Ela (Peggy Zina album) =

Ela Έλα

Studio album by Peggy Zina
- Released: 30 November 2018
- Genre: Modern laika
- Length: 38:39
- Label: Minos EMI
- Producer: Ilias Benetos

Peggy Zina chronology
Para Polla (2015)	Ela; Έλα (2018)

Singles from Ela
- 1. "Mou Leipeis" Released: 11 July 2016; 2. "Apagorevo" Released: 13 March 2017; 3. "O Hronos" Released: 8 September 2017; 4. "Mi M' Akoumpas" Released: 11 December 2017; 5. "Ela" Released: 26 October 2018; 6. "An Tha Sinantithoume" Released: 11 February 2019

Ela (Greek: Έλα; English: Come) is the fourteenth studio album by Greek singer Peggy Zina, released on 30 November 2018 by Minos EMI in Greece and Cyprus.

== Track listing ==
No.	Title	Lyrics	Music	Length
1.	"Ela" (Έλα; Come)	Vasilis Giannopoulos	Kyriakos Papadopoulos	3:39
2.	"O Hronos" (Ο χρόνος; The time)	Vicki Gerothodorou	Kyriakos Papadopoulos	3:57
3.	"Mou Leipeis" (Μου λείπεις; I miss you)	Thanos Papanikolaou	Thanos Papanikolaou	3:59
4.	"Mama" (Μαμά; Mom)	Aggeliki Makrinioti	Hristos Hionis	3:12
5.	"Na M' Agapas" (Να μ' αγαπάς; Love me)	Vasilis Giannopoulos	Iordanis Pavlou	3:25
6.	"Mi M' Akoumpas" (Μη μ' ακουμπάς; Do not touch me)	Stratos Antipariotis (STAN)	Stratos Antipariotis (STAN)	3:03
7.	"Den Dikaiologeitai" (Δεν δικαιολογείται; It is not justified)	Stratos Antipariotis (STAN)	Stratos Antipariotis (STAN)	3:37
8.	"Vasano Mou" (Βάσανό μου; My suffering)	Vasilis Giannopoulos	Kyriakos Papadopoulos	3:04
9.	"Poios Einai Magkas;" (Ποιος είναι μάγκας; Who is cunning?)	Vasilis Giannopoulos	Kyriakos Papadopoulos	3:15
10.	"Apagorevo" (Απαγορεύω; Forbid)	Vasilis Giannopoulos	Hristoforos Germenis	3:37
11.	"An Tha Sinantithoume" (Αν θα συναντηθούμε; If we meet)	Vasilis Giannopoulos	Kyriakos Papadopoulos	3:51

== Music videos ==
- "Mou Leipeis"
- "O Hronos"
- "Mi M' Akoumpas"

== Release history ==
Region	Date	Label	Format	Version
Greece	30 November 2018	Minos EMI	Digital download	Original
Cyprus	30 November 2018	Minos EMI	Digital download	Original
Greece	8 February 2019	Minos EMI	CD	Original
Cyprus	8 February 2019	Minos EMI	CD	Original

== Charts ==
Chart	Provider	Peak position
Greek Albums Chart	IFPI	2
