= Para Polla =

Para Polla Πάρα Πολλά

Studio album by Peggy Zina
- Released: 13 November 2015
- Recorded: 44:57
- Genre: Contemporary laika, pop
- Label: Minos EMI
- Producer: Ilias Benetos

Peggy Zina chronology
Sou Hrostao Akoma Ena Klama (2012)	Para Polla; Πάρα Πολλά (2015)	Ela (2018)

Singles from Para Polla
- 1. "Moni Kardia" Released: 13 October 2014; 2. "Me Tin Plati Ston Toiho" Released: 8 February 2015; 3. "Afto Zitao Mono" Released: 4 June 2015; 4. "Ela Grigora" Released: 24 September 2015; 5. "Mia Mera" Released: 11 February 2016

Para Polla (Greek: Πάρα Πολλά; English: Too many) is the thirteenth studio album by the popular Greek artist Peggy Zina, released on 13 November 2015 by Minos EMI in Greece and Cyprus.

== Track listing ==
No.	Title	Lyrics	Music	Length
1.	"Ela Grigora" (Έλα γρήγορα; Come quickly)	Thanos Papanikolaou	Thanos Papanikolaou	3:50
2.	"Afto Zitao Mono" (Αυτό ζητάω μόνο; This I ask only)	Thanos Papanikolaou	Thanos Papanikolaou	3:30
3.	"Mia Mera" (Μια μέρα; One day)	Stavros Stavrou - Thanos Papanikolaou	Thanos Papanikolaou	3:22
4.	"Para Polla" (Πάρα πολλά; Too many)	Thanos Papanikolaou	Thanos Papanikolaou	3:48
5.	"Stasi Agapi" (Στάση αγάπη; Stop love)	Thanos Papanikolaou	Thanos Papanikolaou	4:25
6.	"Me Tin Plati Ston Toiho" (Με την πλάτη στον τοίχο; With their backs against the wall)	Dimitris Tsafas - Thanos Papanikolaou	Thanos Papanikolaou	3:37
7.	"Mia Diki Tous Zoi" (Μια δική τους ζωή; A life of their own)	Thanos Papanikolaou	Thanos Papanikolaou	3:51
8.	"Exo" (Έξω; Out)	Thanos Papanikolaou	Thanos Papanikolaou	4:14
9.	"Deixe Mou Enan Tropo" (Δείξε μου έναν τρόπο; Show me a way)	Thanos Papanikolaou	Thanos Papanikolaou	4:19
10.	"Afto Itan Olo" (Αυτό ήταν όλο; That was all)	Thanos Papanikolaou	Thanos Papanikolaou	4:07
11.	"To Vouno" (Το βουνό; The mountain)	Thanos Papanikolaou	Thanos Papanikolaou	2:28
12.	"Moni Kardia" (Μόνη καρδιά; Lonely heart)	Stratos Antipariotis (STAN)	Stratos Antipariotis (STAN)	3:26

== Music videos ==
- "Moni Kardia"
- "Me Tin Plati Ston Toiho"
- "Ela Grigora"

== Release history ==
Region	Date	Label	Format	Version
Greece	13 November 2015	Minos EMI	CD	Original
Cyprus	13 November 2015	Minos EMI	CD	Original

== Charts ==
Chart	Provider	Peak position	Certification
Greek Albums Chart	IFPI	4	2× Platinum
