= Evaisthiti... I Logiki? =

Evaisthiti... I Logiki? Ευαίσθητη... Ή Λογική;

Studio album by Peggy Zina
- Released: 6 October 2010
- Genre: Contemporary laika, pop
- Length: 43:37 (Original Edition)
- Label: Minos EMI
- Producer: Thimios Papadopoulos

Peggy Zina chronology
To Pathos Einai Aformi (2009)	Evaisthiti... I Logiki? Ευαίσθητη... Ή Λογική; (2010)	Sou Hrostao Akoma Ena Klama (2012)

Singles from Evaisthiti... I Logiki?
- 1. "Stis Zois To Party" Released: 21 June 2010; 2. "Rotisa" Released: 14 September 2010; 3. "Den Glitono" Released: 10 October 2010; 4. "Mataia" Released: 9 December 2010; 5. "Vimata" Released: 25 February 2011; 6. "Ston Diko Mou Ton Planiti" Released: 29 March 2011

Evaisthiti... I Logiki? (Greek: Ευαίσθητη... Ή Λογική; English: Sensitive... or Logical?) is the eleventh album by the Greek artist Peggy Zina released on 6 October 2010 by Minos EMI in Greece and Cyprus. Written entirely by Giannis Christodoulopoulos and Eleana Vrahali, the album entered the Greek albums chart number one where it remained for three weeks.

== Release and reception ==
Evaisthiti... I Logiki? was released as a limited edition on 6 October 2010 in both CD and vinyl formats in Greece and Cyprus by Minos EMI. The digital download release followed on 8 October 2010. On 10 October 2010, a CD containing short samples of each song was released as a covermount with the Sunday newspaper Proto Thema. On 12 October 2010, the album was given a general release in Greece and Cyprus, while a special edition version of the album was also released with a bonus magazine containing exclusive pictures and interviews. The album's main sponsor is radio station Rythmos 94.9.

On 9 May 2011, Zina released a new digital single titled "Ston Diko Mou Ton Planiti" (Gr. "Στον Δικό Μου Τον Πλανήτη"; On My Own Planet) with an accompanying music video. This single, like the rest of the album written by Giannis Christodoulopoulos and Eleana Vrahali, is part of a reissue of "Evaisthiti... I Logiki?" that was released as a covermount by the newspaper Proto Thema on September 4, 2011.

=== Commercial performance ===
The album entered the charts at number one, where it remained for three weeks before falling to number 10 in its fourth week and number 59 in its fifth week. Shortly after its release, the album achieved 2× Platinum in Greece. A certification party was scheduled to be held on 13 December 2010 at the Metropolis Live Stage in Athens.

== Track listing ==
All lyrics are written by Eleana Vrahali; all music is composed by Giannis Christodoulopoulos.

Original Edition
No.	Title	Length
1.	"Rotisa" (Ρώτησα)	3:58
2.	"Vimata" (Βήματα)	4:00
3.	"Den Mou Axizeis Pia" (Δε Μου Αξίζεις Πια)	5:00
4.	"Mataia" (Μάταια)	4:31
5.	"Logia Agapis" (Λόγια Αγάπης)	4:02
6.	"Stis Zois To Party" (Στης Ζωής Το Πάρτυ)	3:59
7.	"Den Glitono (feat. Dimitris Mitropanos)" (Δε Γλυτώνω)	5:34
8.	"Erotas Thanatos" (Έρωτας Θάνατος)	4:23
9.	"Na Mi Se Sinantiso" (Να Μη Σε Συναντήσω)	4:24
10.	"An Me Deis Na Klaio" (Αν Με Δεις Να Κλαίω)	3:46
Total length:		43:37

Re-release Edition
No.	Title	Length
1.	"Ston Diko Mou Ton Planiti" (Στον Δικό Μου Τον Πλανήτη)	3:13
2.	"Rotisa" (Ρώτησα)	3:58
3.	"Vimata" (Βήματα)	4:00
4.	"Den Mou Axizeis Pia" (Δε Μου Αξίζεις Πια)	5:00
5.	"Mataia" (Μάταια)	4:31
6.	"Logia Agapis" (Λόγια Αγάπης)	4:02
7.	"Stis Zois To Party" (Στης Ζωής Το Πάρτυ)	3:59
8.	"Den Glitono (feat. Dimitris Mitropanos)" (Δε Γλυτώνω)	5:34
9.	"Erotas Thanatos" (Έρωτας Θάνατος)	4:23
10.	"Na Mi Se Sinantiso" (Να Μη Σε Συναντήσω)	4:24
11.	"An Me Deis Na Klaio" (Αν Με Δεις Να Κλαίω)	3:46
Total length:		46:50

== Singles ==
"Stis Zois To Party"

"Stis Zois To Party" was the first single from the album, and was released to all radio stations on 21 June 2010.

"Rotisa"

"Rotisa" was the second single from the album, and was premiered on Rythmos 949 on 14 September 2010. The music video for the song was released on 26 September 2010.

"Den Glitono"

"Den Glitono" is the third single from the album. It was released to radio stations on 10 October 2010, while a one track promotional CD-single containing the song was released as a covermount by the newspaper Proto Thema on 24 October 2010.

"Mataia"

"Mataia" was the fourth single from the album, and was released to all radio stations on 9 December 2010.

"Vimata"

"Vimata" was the fifth single from the album, and was released to all radio stations on 25 February 2011.

"Ston Diko Mou Ton Planiti"

"Ston Diko Mou Ton Planiti" was the sixth single from the album, and was released to all radio stations on 19 March 2011.

== Release history ==
Region	Date	Label	Format	Version
Greece	6 October 2010	Minos EMI	CD, Vinyl	Standard
Cyprus	6 October 2010	Minos EMI	CD, Vinyl	Standard
Greece	8 October 2010	Minos EMI	Digital download	Standard
Cyprus	8 October 2010	Minos EMI	Digital download	Standard
Greece	10 October 2010	Minos EMI	CD	Newspaper sample
Greece	12 October 2010	Minos EMI	CD	Special edition
Cyprus	12 October 2010	Minos EMI	CD	Special edition

== Charts ==
Chart	Providers	Peak position	Certification
Greek Albums Chart	IFPI	1	2× Platinum
Cypriot Album Chart	All Records Top 10	1	Platinum
