= Ti Th' Akouso Akoma =

Single by Peggy Zina

from the album Ena Hadi
- Released: July 4, 2000
- Genre: Pop, Modern Laïka
- Length: 3:21
- Label: Nitro Music
- Songwriters: Kyriakos Papadopoulos, Ilias Fillipou

Peggy Zina singles chronology
"Ti Th' Akouso Akoma" (2000)	"Love Is a Wonderful Thing" (2002)

"Ti Th' Akouso Akoma" (Greek: "Τι θ'ακούσω ακόμα"; English: What Else Will I Hear) is a song by popular Greek artist Peggy Zina. It was released on July 4, 2000 by Nitro Music and is included on her album Ena Hadi. The song was written by Kyriakos Papadopoulos and Ilias Fillipou and was released as a four track CD single.

== Track listing ==
1. "Ti Th' Akouso Akoma" - 3:21
2. "Mia Fora Sto Toso" - 3:05
3. "Afta Pou Ikseres Palia" - 3:42
4. "Oneira Mou Taksidiarikia" - 3:18
