= To Pathos Einai Aformi =

Το Πάθος Είναι Αφορμή To Pathos Einai Aformi

Studio album by Peggy Zina
- Released: May 23, 2009
- Genre: Rock, pop rock, modern laika
- Length: 47:24
- Language: Greek
- Label: EMI/Minos
- Producer: Thimios Papadopoulos

Peggy Zina chronology
Best of + (2008)	Το Πάθος Είναι Αφορμή; To Pathos Einai Aformi (2009)	Evaisthiti... I Logiki? (2010)

Peggy Zina studio album chronology
Trekse (2007)	To Pathos Einai Aformi (2009)	Evaisthiti... I Logiki? (2010)

Singles from To Pathos Einai Aformi
- 1. "Anatheorisa" Released: April 23, 2009; 2. "Ela Nihta" Released: July 21, 2009; 3. "An M'Agapas" Released: September 22, 2009; 4. "Hanome" Released: December 12, 2009; 5. "Se Griza Othoni" Released: April 22, 2010

To Pathos Einai Aformi (Greek: Το Πάθος Είναι Αφορμή; English: Passion is a motive) is the tenth studio album by the popular Greek artist Peggy Zina, released on May 23, 2009, by Minos EMI.

== Track listing ==
No.	Title	Lyrics	Music	Length
1.	"An M'Agapas" (Αν μ'αγαπάς; If You Love Me)	Eleana Vrahali	Giorgos Sabanis	3:46
2.	"Ela Nihta" (Ελα νύχτα; Come, Night)	Vicki Gerothodorou	Dimitris Korgialas	4:32
3.	"O Hiroteros Ehthros Mou" (Ο χειρότερος εχθρός μου; My Worst Enemy)	Giannis Doxas	Giorgos Sabanis	3:20
4.	"Hanome" (Χάνομαι; I'm Getting Lost)	Giannis Doxas	Giorgos Sabanis	4:09
5.	"Se Griza Othoni" (Σε γκρίζα οθόνη; On A Grey Screen)	Nicki Papatheohari	Giorgos Sabanis	3:47
6.	"An Thimame Kala" (Αν θυμάμαι καλά; If I Remember Correctly)	Giorgos Moukidis	Giorgos Moukidis	3:45
7.	"Anatheorisa" (Αναθεώρησα; I Revised)	Manos Eleftheriou	Giorgos Sabanis	3:39
8.	"Afilaktes Diavasis" (Αφύλακτες διαβάσεις; Unguarded Crossings)	Manos Eleftheriou	Giorgos Sabanis	4:31
9.	"Perpatao Sta Kimata" (Περπατώ στα κύματα; I'm Walking On The Waves)	Giannis Doxas	Giorgos Sabanis	3:27
10.	"Ftes" (Φταίς; You're To Blame)	Giorgos Moukidis	Giorgos Moukidis	4:49
11.	"Mi Mou Lete Mi" (Μη μου λέτε μη; Don't Tell Me Don't)	Eleana Vrahali	Giorgos Sabanis	3:51
12.	"Otan Sopeni Ena Kormi" (Όταν σωπαίνει ένα κορμί; When A Body Is Silent)	Manos Eleftheriou	Giorgos Sabanis	3:48

Data Tracks (Music Video)
No.	Title	Lyrics	Music	Length
1.	"Anatheorisa" (Αναθεώρησα; I revised)	Manos Eleftheriou	Giorgos Sabanis	3:39

== Charts and certifications ==
In March 2009, IFPI announced that it would close its charts for a period of time in order to re-new the charting system, thus it is not possible to track the chart and sales records of To Pathos Einai Aformi. On July 17, 2009, IFPI confirmed via email that the album had reached gold status in Greece. On September 20, 2009, IFPI confirmed via email that the album had reached platinum status in Greece. In an article in Hello magazine in January 2010 announcing a planned repackage edition of the album, it was revealed that the album had reached 2× Platinum status. The repackaged edition never materialised.

Chart	Providers	Peak position	Certification
Greek Albums Chart	IFPI		2× Platinum
Cypriot Album Chart	All Records Top 10	1	Platinum
