= Nikos Vertis =

Greek singer

Nikos Vertis Νίκος Βέρτης
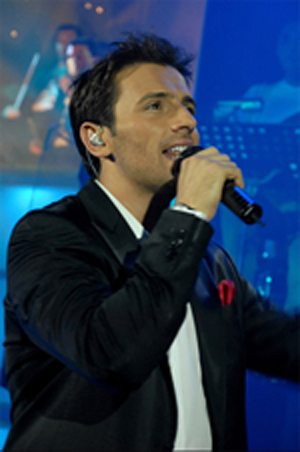
- Nikos Vertis in 2007

Background information
- Born: Nikolaos Arvanitidis; 21 August 1976 (age 50); Gorinchem, Netherlands
- Origin: Kavala, Greece
- Genres: Modern laika, pop
- Years active: 2003–present
- Labels: Universal Music Greece, Heaven Music
- Website: www.nikosvertis.com

Nikolaos Arvanitidis (Greek: Νικόλαος Αρβανιτίδης), better known by his stage name Nikos Vertis (Greek: Νίκος Βέρτης) is a Greek singer. He was born on 21 August 1976 in Gorinchem, Netherlands, and his origin is from Galipsos village, near Kavala. To date, he has released five studio albums along with one CD single, and two special edition CD/DVD albums.

== Career ==
=== Early life ===
The son of Argyris Arvanitidis and Morfoula, at the age of six, Vertis and his family moved to Thessaloniki, Greece, and at seven, he started playing the bouzouki. By the age of 15, he was involved with singing. At age 16, he moved back to the Netherlands for two years, where he attended a technical high school. He returned to Greece for his military duties and, once completed, started being involved with his love of singing. He started singing in small clubs in Thessaloniki and other locations around the region of Macedonia. In summer 2002, he started singing at the popular club "Rodon" where he made a big impact, and continued singing there until summer 2003.

=== 2003-2004: Poli Apotoma Vradiazei and Pame Psihi Mou ===
In 2003, Vertis signed with Universal Music Greece and released his first album, titled Poli Apotoma Vradiazei (Night comes too fast). The songs "Asteri Mou", "An Feigeis", "San Trelos Se Agapao" and the title track "Poli Apotoma Vradiazei" became radio hits in a short time, while Peggy Zina sang two duets on the album called "Eimaste Horia" and "Hanomaste" which were also radio hits. For the winter season of 2003-2004, Vertis moved to Athens where he collaborated with Zina at club Apollon. At the third annual "Arion Awards" in 2003, Vertis won the award for "Best New Artist".

In May 2004, Vertis started singing at club "Rodon" in Thessaloniki again, in successful shows until August. In September 2004, he released his second album, Pame Psihi Mou (Lets go my soul), with songs by Giorgos Theofanos. The songs "Pos Tolmas", "Thimamai" and "Se Mena" become radio hits. At the same time, he started performing at club "Posidonio" for the winter season of 2004-2005. His performances there were highly successfully, with some calling him "The next big laiko singer". At the fourth annual Arion Music Awards in 2004, he was nominated in the category "Best Male Laiko Singer".

=== 2005-2006: Pes To Mou Ksana and Pos Pernao Ta Vradia Monos ===
In spring 2005, he started his second round of performances at club "Posidonio" where he remained for the whole summer. In summer 2005, he released his first CD single titled "Pes To Mou Ksana" (Tell it to me again), which was certified Platinum and awarded the "Best-selling Greek Single of the Year" at the fifth Arion Awards.

For the winter season 2005-2006, he continued singing at club Posidonio. In December 2005, he released his third album, Pos Perno Ta Vradia Monos (How I pass the evenings alone). The CD had music by Kiriakos Papadopoulos with lyrics by Ilias Filippou. The album was quickly certified Platinum, while the songs "Pes To Mou Ksana", "Poia Esu", "Pos Na To Exigiso", "Den Se Niazei" and "Kapote Tha Deis" become radio hits. In the beginning of 2006, Vertis re-released the album as a special edition with a bonus DVD with seven music videos.

=== 2007–present: Mono Gia Sena and Ola Einai Edo ===
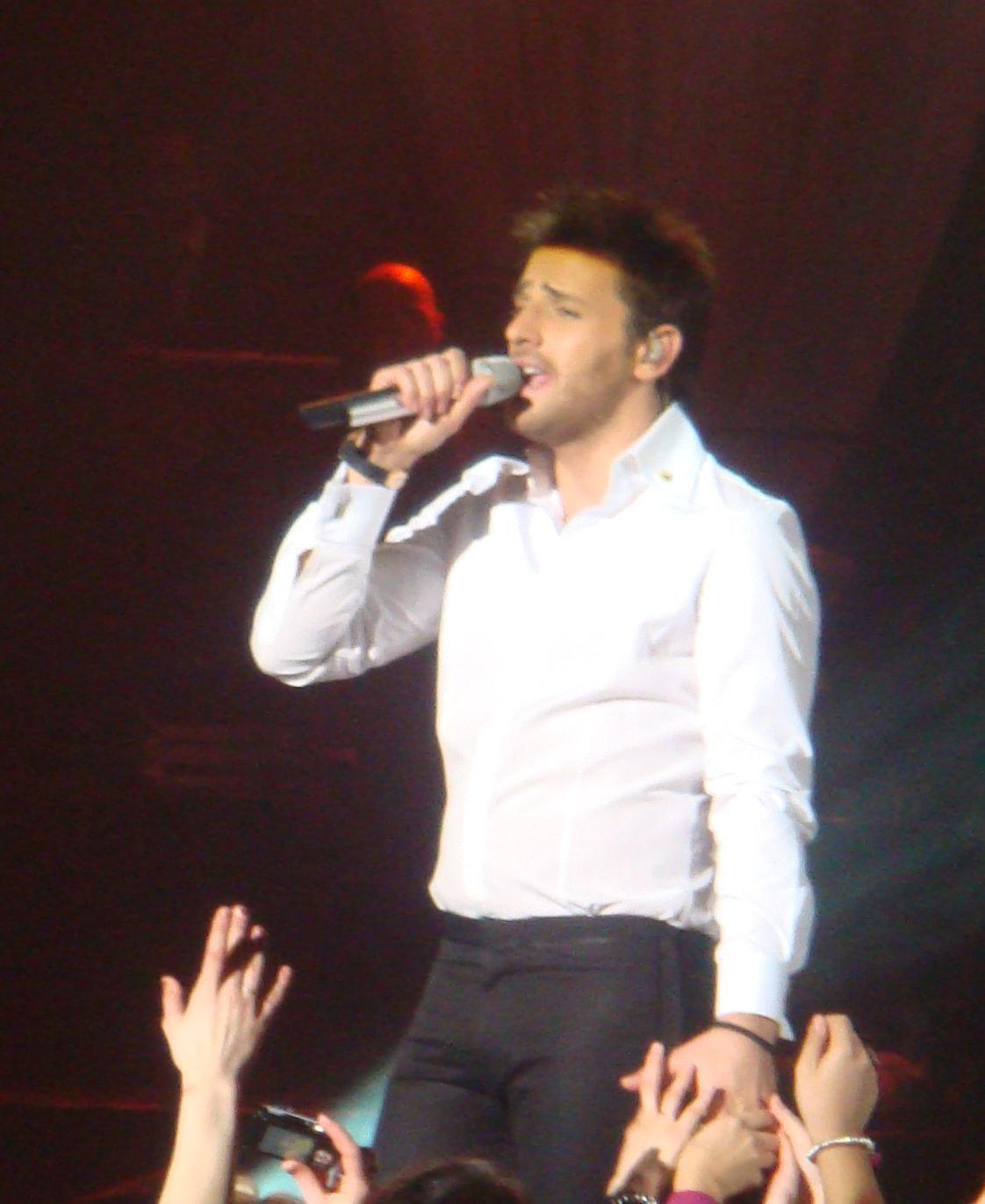
Nikos Vertis performing at Hammersmith Apollo in London on 17 February 2009

For the winter season of 2006-2007, Vertis sang again at club "Posidonion". In March, he started recording his fourth studio album, titled Mono Gia Sena (Only for you), which was released in April 2007 and included a bonus DVD. From the album, the songs "Mono Gia Sena", "Matia Mou Glyka", "Parapono Mou", "Svista Ola" and "De M'Agapas" became instant radio hits and charted throughout the summer. In July 2007, the album was certified platinum, and became double platinum by February 2008. For the winter season of 2007-2008, he sang for the fourth year in a row at club "Posidonion", ending on 14 January 2008. The final night was filled with guest appearances by fellow singers and friends such as Antonis Remos, George Dalaras, Antonis Vardis and other celebrities. In October 2008, Vertis began a world tour of 20 concerts in Australia, Israel, the United States, Canada and Europe, ending on 17 January 2009 at the Hammersmith Apollo in London.

Vertis' fifth studio album, Ola Einai Edo (Everything is here), was originally announced to be a February 2009 release, but was finally released in early April. The 12-track album was written by Christos Nikolopoulos, Antonis Vardis and Dimitris Dekos. It was released in three versions: a standard 12-track album in a jewel case, an edition in a rectangular box with a bonus "Mega-Mix" CD of 13 of Vertis' greatest hits, and a version that includes a magazine. As part of Universal Music's promotional campaign, a digipak edition with a fixed price of €9.90 was also released, at about half of the average new album price in the Greek market then. The first single, "Den Teliosame", was released to radios in early April and is an erotic ballad; a music video was created and was directed by Giorgos Gabalos. The album was certified Platinum quickly, and later certified 4× Platinum.

== Discography ==
- Poli Apotoma Vradiazei (2003)
- Pame Psichi Mou (2004)
- Pos Perno Ta Vradia Monos (2005)
- Mono Gia Sena (2007)
- Ola Einai Edo (2009)
- Eimai Mazi Sou (2011)
- Protaseis (2013)
- Nikos Vertis Live Tour – 10 Chronia (2014)
- Nikos Vertis (2015)
- Erotevmenos (2017)
- Mou Elipses Poli (2025)
