= Matono =

Studio album by Peggy Zina
- Released: July 11, 2004
- Recorded: 2004
- Genre: Contemporary laika
- Length: 67:30
- Label: EMI/Minos
- Producer: Giorgos Moukidis

Peggy Zina chronology
Mazi Sou (2003)	Matono (2004)	Noima (2005)

Singles from Matono
- 1. "Matono" Released: April 26, 2004; 2. "Pouthena" Released: June 7, 2004; 3. "Efiges" Released: July 12, 2004; 4. "Monaxa Emena Na Rotas" Released: August 30, 2004; 5. "Diokse Tin Pikra" Released: September 26, 2004

Matono (Greek: Ματώνω; English: I'm bleeding) is the title of the sixth studio album by the popular Greek artist Peggy Zina, released in 2004 by Minos EMI.

== Track list ==
No.	Title	Lyrics	Music	Length
1.	"Matono" (Ματώνω; I'm Bleeding)	Vasilis Giannopoulos	Christos Dantis	3:33
2.	"Pouthena" (Πουθενά; Nowhere)	Giorgos Moukidis	Giorgos Moukidis	5:29
3.	"Efiges" (Έφυγες; You left)	Giorgos Moukidis	Giorgos Moukidis	3:58
4.	"Diokse Tin Pikra" (Διώξε την πίκρα; Chase bitterness away)	Vasilis Giannopoulos	Hristoforos Germenis	4:08
5.	"Opoios Kai An Eisai" (Όποιος και αν είσαι; Whoever You Are)	Vasilis Giannopoulos	Hristoforos Germenis	3:53
6.	"Logia" (Λόγια; Words)	Ilias Filippou	Kyriakos Papadopoulos	3:42
7.	"Horis Ftera" (Χωρίς φτερά; Without Wings)	Giorgos Moukidis	Giorgos Moukidis	4:00
8.	"Monaxa Emena Na Rotas" (Μονάχα εμένα να ρωτάς; Ask Only Me)	Giorgos Moukidis	Giorgos Moukidis	3:23
9.	"Ela Kardia Mou" (Έλα καρδιά μου; Come, My Heart)	Ilias Filippou	Kyriakos Papadopoulos	3:15
10.	"Mia Vradia Horismou" (Μια βραδιά χωρισμού; An Evening of Separation)	Stelios Hronis	Stelios Hronis	3:23
11.	"Pou Ta Les Auta" (Που τα λές αυτά; Who Are You Talking To)	Ilias Filippou	Kytiakos Papadopoulos	2:54
12.	"Tora Pou To Skeftikes" (Τώρα που το σκέφτηκες; Now That You Thought Of It)	Ilias Filippou	Kyriakos Papadopoulos	2:55
13.	"Osa Pernei O Anemos" (Όσα παίρνει ο άνεμος; Whatever blows away)	Kosmas	Akis Dimixos	3:35
14.	"Nihta Mi Me Maloneis" (Νύχτα μην με μαλώνεις; Night, don't scold me)	Vasilis Giannopoulos	Hristoforos Germenis	3:39
15.	"Otan Peftei Ena Asteri" (Όταν Πέφτει ένα αστέρι; When A Star Falls)	Vasilis Giannopoulos	Hristoforos Gremenis	3:39
16.	"De Leei" (Δεν λέει; It doesn't say (My heart can't forget you))	Ilias Filippou	Kyriakos Papadopoulos	4:08
17.	"De Hreiazetai" (Δεν χρειάζεται; There's No Need)	Giorgos Moukidis	Giorgos Moukidis	4:00
18.	""Pouthena" (Radio Version)"	Giorgos Moukidis	Giorgos Moukidis	4:09
19.	"Ta Monopatia (ft Kostas Karafotis)" (Tα μονοπάτια; The Paths)	Viki Gerothodorou	Antonios Vardis	5:03

== Trivia ==
In 2005, Christos Dantis released an English language cover single of Matono titled "I'm Bleeding".

== Charts ==
Chart	Provider	Peak position	Certification
Greek Albums Chart	IFPI	1	Platinum
Cypriot Album Chart	All Records Top 20	1	Gold
