= Peggy Zina (album) =

Studio album by Peggy Zina
- Released: October 3, 1995
- Genres: Modern laika, pop
- Length: 36:06
- Label: BMG Greece/Ria

Peggy Zina chronology
Peggy Zina (1995)	Anevaines (1998)

Singles from Peggy Zina
- 1. "An Pas Me Alli" Released: September 26, 1995; 2. "Den Boro Na Filiso Kanenan" Released: January 10, 1996

Peggy Zina (Greek: Πέγκυ Ζήνα) is the first album by popular Greek artist Peggy Zina, released in October 1995 by BMG Greece. The album includes her first hit which created controversy with the title: "An Pas Me Alli Tha Sou Spaso To Kefali" (If You Go with Another Woman I Will Break Your Head).

== Track listing ==
1. "Den Boro Na Filiso Kanenan" (Δεν μπορώ να φιλήσω κανένα; I cannot kiss no one)- 3:17
2. "Mas Ta Pan Ki Alloi" (Μας τα παν κι' άλλοι; Us and everything) - 3:05
3. "An Pas Me Alli" (Αν πάς με άλλη; If you go with another woman) - 3:29
4. "Kai Kartero" (Και καρτερώ; And wait) - 3:59
5. "Kratise Me" (Κράτησέ με; It kept) - 3:34
6. "Hanomai" (Χάνομαι; I get lost) - 3:00
7. "Anisiho" (Ανησυχώ; I'm worried) - 3:52
8. "Den Thelo Kouventes" (Δεν θέλω κουβέντες; I do not want conversations) - 3:30
9. "Prospoieisai" (Προσποιείσαι; you make yourself) - 4:20
10. "Gyrises" (Γύρισες; You turned) - 4:00
