= Noima =

Noima Νόημα

Studio album by Peggy Zina
- Released: 12 September 2005
- Studio: Workshop studio Argyriou Recordings studio
- Genre: Contemporary laika
- Length: 43:59
- Language: Greek
- Label: Minos EMI
- Producer: Giorgos Theofanous

Peggy Zina chronology
Matono (2004)	Noima; Νόημα (2005)	Ta Prota Hronia (2005)

Singles from Noima
- 1. "Noima" Released: September 2005; 2. "Mi rotate" Released: November 2005; 3. "Sou t' orkizomai" Released: January 2006; 4. "Ena simadi" Released: March 2006; 5. "Anipomono" Released: April 2006; 6. "Metaniono" Released: May 2006

Noima (Greek: Νόημα; English: Meaning) is the seventh studio album by Greek singer Peggy Zina. It was released on 12 September 2005 by Minos EMI and was certified gold, selling over 30,000 units. It was entirely written and produced by Giorgos Theofanous. The album was unique in that was released with four different covers featuring Zina with her eyes open, wearing Aviator style sunglasses, wearing a tiara, and with her eyes closed and hair flowing across her face.

== Track listing ==
All tracks are written by Giorgos Theofanous

No.	Title	Length
1.	"Ola" (Όλα; All)	3:41
2.	"Noima" (Νόημα; Meaning)	4:45
3.	"Anipomono" (Ανυπομονώ; Look forward)	4:13
4.	"Mi rotate" (Μη ρωτάτε; Don't ask)	4:33
5.	"Ena simadi" (Ένα σημάδι; A sign)	4:09
6.	"Sou t' orkizomai" (Σου τ' ορκίζομαι; I swear to you)	3:45
7.	"Krima" (Κρίμα; Pity)	3:38
8.	"Svise tin fotia" (Σβήσε την φωτιά; Put the fire out)	3:46
9.	"Metaniono" (Μετανιώνω; I regret)	3:14
10.	"Gia dio matia" (Για δυο μάτια; For two eyes)	4:03
11.	"Meine akoma ligo" (Μείνε ακόμα λίγο; Stay a little more)	4:12
Total length:		43:59

== Singles ==
Six songs were officially released as singles at radio stations with music videos:

1. "Noima" (Νόημα)
2. "Mi rotate" (Μη ρωτάτε)
3. "Sou t' orkizomai" (Σου τ' ορκίζομαι)
4. "Ena simadi" (Ένα σημάδι)
5. "Anipomono" (Ανυπομονώ)
6. "Metaniono" (Μετανιώνω)

== Credits ==
Credits adapted from liner notes.

=== Personnel ===
- Yiannis Bithikotsis – bouzouki (2, 3, 4, 7, 8, 10, 11) / cura (4, 8) / baglama (3, 4, 7, 8)
- Savvas Christodoulou – guitars (1, 2, 3, 4, 5, 6, 7, 8, 9, 10, 11)
- Akis Diximos – second vocal (1, 4, 8, 9)
- Simos Kinalis – säz, cümbüş (9)
- Katerina Kyriakou – backing vocals (3, 5, 7, 10)
- Kostas Liolios – drums (1, 2, 3, 4, 6, 7, 8, 9, 11)
- Alex Panayi – backing vocals (3, 5, 7, 10)
- Elena Patroklou – backing vocals (3, 5, 7, 10)
- Giorgos Roilos – percussion (9)
- Giorgos Theofanous – orchestration, programming, keyboards
- Zoi Tiganouria – accordion
- Philippos Tseberoulis – saxophone (1)
- Leonidas Tzitzos – keyboards (5)
- Nikos Vardis – bass (1, 2, 3, 4, 6, 7, 8, 9, 11)
- Thanasis Vasilopoulos – clarinet (6, 9) / ney (9)

=== Production ===
- Takis Argyriou – mix engineer, vocal engineer
- Ilias Benetos – production manager
- Dimitris Chorianopoulos – sound engineer / mix engineer (1, 5, 10)
- Thodoris Chrisanthopoulos (Fabelsound) – mastering
- K2design – artwork
- Maria-Christina Polymenakou – styling
- Konstantinos Rigos – concept
- Roula Stamatopoulou – make up
- Giorgos Theofanous – executive producer
- Stefanos Vasilakis – hair styling
- Tasos Vrettos – photographer

== Charts ==
Noima made its debut at number 1 for 41 weeks on the 'Top 50 Greek Albums' charts by IFPI.

Chart	Providers	Peak position	Certification
Greek Albums Chart	IFPI	1	Gold
Cypriot Album Chart	All Records Top 20	1	Gold
