= Anevaines =

Studio album by Peggy Zina
- Released: November 13, 1998
- Genre: Modern laika
- Length: 42:57
- Label: BMG Greece/RCA

Peggy Zina chronology
Peggy Zina (1995)	Anevaines (1998)	Ena Hadi (2001)

Singles from Anevaines
- 1. "Anavaines" Released: August 20, 1998; 2. "Psihi Mou Moni" Released: October 26, 1998

Anevaines (Greek: Ανέβαινες; English: You rose) is the second studio album by the popular Greek artist Peggy Zina, released in 1998 by BMG Greece.

== Track listing ==
1. "M' Ena Pseftiko Sougia" (Μ' ένα ψέυτικο σουγιά; A false pocketknife) - 4:21
2. "Anevaines" (Ανέβαινες; You rise) - 3:18
3. "Sinnefiasmeni Kyriaki" (Συνεφιασμένη κυριακή; Cloudy Sunday) - 4:26
4. "Psihi Mou Moni" (Ψυχή μου μόνη; my Soul alone) - 3:19
5. "Den Eimai Tipota" (Δεν είμαι τίποτα; I am nothing) - 2:59
6. "O Kaliteros Tropos" (Ο καλύτερος τρόπος; The better way) - 3:35
7. "Leme Leme" (Λέμε λέμε; We say we say) - 3:08
8. "Me Parakoloutheis" (Με παρακολουθείς; You watch me) - 3:44
9. "Dikeologies" (Δικαιολογίες; Excuses) - 3:18
10. "Apomonothikes" (Απομονώθηκες; You were isolated) - 3:13
11. "Μythos" (Μύθος; Fable) - 3:17
12. "Alkionides Meres" (Αλκυονύδες μέρες; Halcyon days) - 4:27
