= Ena (album) =

Studio album by Peggy Zina
- Released: 8 November 2006
- Recorded: Diogenes Studio
- Genre: Modern laika
- Length: 55:10 (Original release); 1:09:19 (new edition)
- Language: Greek
- Label: EMI/Minos
- Producer: Ilias Benetos

Peggy Zina chronology
Ta Prota Hronia (2005)	Ena (2006)	Trekse (2007)

Singles from Ena
- 1. "Ena" Released: 26 October 2006; 2. "Ego Ta Spao" Released: 7 January 2007; 3. "Eimai Edo" Released: 12 February 2007; 4. "Mystiko" Released: 12 July 2007

Ena (Greek: Ένα; "One") is the eighth studio album by the popular Greek artist Peggy Zina, recorded at Diogenes Studio and released on 8 November 2006, by Minos EMI. In August 2007, it was repackaged with Zina's single "Mystiko" and named Ena New Edition.

The song "Mystiko" was written for her wedding, where she sang the song to her husband at the reception.

== Track listing ==
Ena
No.	Title	Lyrics	Music	Length
1.	"Ena" (Ένα; One)	Viki Gerothodorou	Takis Bougas	3:39
2.	"Zisame" (Ζήσαμε; We Lived)	Eleana Vrahali	Dimitris Kontopoulos	3:41
3.	"To' ksera" (Το 'ξερα; I Knew It)	Vasilis Giannopoulos	Kyriakos Papadopoulos	4:01
4.	"Gi Ki Ouranos" (Γη κι ουρανός; Earth And Sky)	Giorgos Moukidis	Giorgos Moukidis	3:34
5.	"Pes Tou" (Πες του; Tell Him)	Kostis Liapis	Takis Bougas	3:45
6.	"Sto Kalo" (Στο καλό; Farewell)	Vasilis Giannopoulos	Kyriakos Papadopoulos	3:14
7.	"Tora Ti Kano" (Τώρα τι κάνω; Now What Do I Do)	Panos Falaras	Takis Bougas	3:57
8.	"Ego Ta Spao" (Εγώ τα σπάω; I Break Them)	Vasilis Giannopoulos	Kyriakos Papadopoulos	3:41
9.	"Zilia" (Ζήλεια; Jealousy)	Giorgos Moukidis	Giorgos Moukidis	3:37
10.	"De Se Sighoro" (Δε σε συγχωρώ; I Don't Forgive You)	Giorgos Moukidis	Giorgos Moukidis	3:38
11.	"Fantasia Mou" (Φαντασία μου; My Imagination)	Giorgos Moukidis	Giorgos Moukidis	4:04
12.	"Sti Salloniki" (Στη Σαλονίκη; In Saloniki)	Giorgos Moukidis	Giorgos Moukidis	4:07
13.	"De Goustaro Na Se Vlepo" (Δε γουστάρω να σε βλέπω; I Don't Want To See You)	Vasilis Giannopoulos	Kyriakos Papadopoulos	3:34
14.	"Pos Na To Palepso" (Πως να το παλέψω; How Should I Fight This)	Giorgos Moukidis	Giorgos Moukidis	2:59
15.	"Eimai Edo" (Είμαι εδώ; I'm Here)	Eleana Vrahali	Dimitris Kontopoulos	3:46

Mystiko
No.	Title	Lyrics	Music	Length
16.	"Mystiko" (Μυστικό; Secret)	Giorgos Moukidis	Giorgos Moukidis	5:44
17.	"Teleftaio Potiraki (ft Christos Dantis)" (Το τελευταίο ποτηράκι; The last shot)	Christos Kolokotronis	Manolis Hiotis	4:13
18.	"Mystiko (Radio Edit)"	Giorgos Moukidis	Giorgos Moukidis	4:12

== Singles ==
The following songs from the album were released as radio singles and each featured a music video:

"Ena"

"Ena" was the first single released from the album. A music video for the song was made, directed by Konstantinos Rigos.

"Ego Ta Spao"

"Ego Ta Spao" was the second single released from the album and also has a music video directed by Rigos. The video was first shown on MAD TV on 31 January 2007.

"Eimai Edo"

"Eimai Edo" was the third and final single from the album and also has a music video directed by Rigos.

== Charts ==
The Special Edition of the album remained on the Cypriot Album Chart for more than 52 weeks

Chart	Provider	Peak position	Certification	Sales
Greek Albums Chart	IFPI	1	Platinum	30,000
Cypriot Album Chart	All Records Top 40	1	Platinum	
