= Ena Hadi =

Ena Hadi Ένα Χάδι

Studio album by Peggy Zina
- Released: 21 February 2001
- Studio: Sofita studio Power Music studio Argyriou Recordings studio
- Genre: Modern laika
- Length: 55:39
- Label: Nitro Music
- Producer: Posidonas Yiannopoulos

Peggy Zina chronology
Anevaines (1998)	Ena Hadi; Ένα Χάδι (2001)	Vres Enan Tropo (2002)

Singles from Ena hadi
- 1. "Ti Th' Akouso Akoma" Released: 3 July 2000; 2. "Poli Kala Pername" Released: 19 March 2001; 3. "Oute Na To Skeftesai" Released: 5 August 2001; 4. "Ena Hadi" Released: 10 September 2001

Ena Hadi (Greek: Ένα Χάδι; English: A Caress) is the third studio album by the Greek singer Peggy Zina. It was released on 21 February 2001 by Nitro Music, selling 20,000 units. The album was written by several artists, including Kyriakos Papadopoulos, Elias Philippou, Konstantinos Pantzis, and well-known singers Antonis Vardis, Yiannis Parios and Stelios Rokkos.

== Tracklist ==
No.	Title	Lyrics	Music	Length
1.	"Poli Kala Pername" (Πολύ Καλά Περνάμε; We're Having A Good Time)	Posidonas Yiannopoulos	Konstantinos Pantzis	3:23
2.	"Oute Na To Skeftesai" (Ούτε Να Το Σκέφτεσαι; Don't Even Think About It)	Elias Filippou	Kyriakos Papadopoulos	3:53
3.	"Ena Hadi" (Ένα Χάδι; A Caress)	Elias Filippou	Kyriakos Papadopoulos	3:58
4.	"Mia Kali Kouventa" (Μια Καλή Κουβέντα; A Good Word)	Elias Filippou	Kyriakos Papadopoulos	3:52
5.	"I Aitia Tou Kakou" (Η Αιτία Του Κακού; The Cause Of Evil)	Niki Spyropoulou	Konstantinos Pantzis	3:47
6.	"Lathos Anthropo" (Λάθος Άνθρωπο; Wrong Man)	Maria Kantioti	Stelios Chronis	3:19
7.	"Hartini Exedra" (Χάρτινη Εξέδρα; Paper Stand)	Elias Filippou	Kyriakos Papadopoulos	3:22
8.	"Ego Agapo Allios" (Εγώ Αγαπώ Αλλιώς; I Love You Otherwise)	Panos Falaras	Konstantinos Pantzis	3:55
9.	"Kleiste Tis Portes" (Κλείστε Τις Πόρτες; Close The Doors)	Yiannis Parios	Antonis Vardis	4:05
10.	"Diki Mou Ipothesi" (Δική Μου Υπόθεση; My Case)	Elias Filippou	Kyriakos Papadopoulos	3:23
11.	"Ohi, Mi Giriseis Piso" (Όχι, Μη Γυρίσεις Πίσω; No, Don't Come Back)	Niki Spyropoulou	Konstantinos Pantzis	4:44
12.	"Oses Fores" (Όσες Φορές; Many Times)	Stelios Rokkos	Stelios Rokkos	3:35
13.	"Athoriva" (Αθόρυβα; Silent)	Elias Filippou	Kyriakos Papadopoulos	3:41
14.	"Ti Th' Akouso Akoma" (Τι Θ' Ακούσω Ακόμα; What Will I Hear Yet)	Elias Filippou	Kyriakos Papadopoulos	3:22
15.	"Oneira Mou Taxidiarika" (Όνειρα Μου Ταξιδιάρικα; My Travelogue Dreams)	Elias Filippou	Kyriakos Papadopoulos	3:18
Total length:				55:39

== Singles ==
Four songs was officially released as singles at radio stations with music videos:

1. "Ti Th' Akouso Akoma" (What Will I Hear Yet)
2. "Poli Kala Pername" (We're Having A Good Time)
3. "Oute Na To Skeftesai" (Don't Even Think About It)
4. "Ena Hadi" (A Caress)

== Credits ==
Credits adapted from liner notes.

=== Personnel ===
- Dimitris Antoniou – guitars (5, 8, 11)
- Mohamend Arafa – percussion (14, 15)
- Yiannis Bithikotsis – bouzouki (2, 13) / cura (11) / baglama (5, 11, 13)
- Spyros Chalkiopoulos – backing vocals (14)
- Tasos Delimihalis – guitars (7, 14, 15)
- Ahilleas Diamantis – guitars (2, 13)
- Stratos Diamantis – orchestration, programming, keyboards (2, 10, 13)
- George Dramalis – bouzouki (14, 15)
- Nikos Georgountzos – orchestration, programming, keyboards (12)
- Vasilis Gkinos – orchestration, programming, keyboards (3, 4, 6, 9)
- Antonis Gounaris – guitars (9)
- Katerina Kyriakou – backing vocals (1, 2, 5, 7, 8, 10, 11, 14)
- Andreas Mouzakis – drums (5, 8, 11)
- Alex Panayi – backing vocals (1, 2, 5, 7, 8, 10, 11)
- Konstantinos Pantzis – orchestration, programming, keyboards (1, 5, 8, 11)
- Kyriakos Papadopoulos – orchestration, programming, keyboards (7, 14, 15) / accordion (14)
- Stavros Pazarentzis – clarinet (15)
- George Roilos – percussion (5, 11)
- Panayiotis Stergiou – guitars (3, 4, 6, 9, 12) / bouzouki (4, 6, 12) / cura (3, 6) / baglama (4, 6)
- Nikos Vardis – bass (5, 8, 11)
- Thanasis Vasilopoulos – clarinet, ney (9)
- Peggy Zina – second vocal (3, 4, 6)
- Martha Zioga – backing vocals (14)

=== Production ===
- Takis Argyriou – sound engineer, mix engineer (3, 4, 6, 7, 9, 12, 14, 15)
- Aris Binis – sound engineer, mix engineer (1, 5, 8, 11)
- Ahilleas Charitos – make up
- Stratos Diamantis – sound engineer (2, 10, 13)
- Ntinos Diamantopoulos – photographer
- Yiannis Ioannidis (Digital Press Hellas) – mastering
- Lefteris Neromyliotis – sound engineer, mix engineer (1, 5, 8, 11)
- Vasilis Nikolopoulos – mix engineer (2, 10, 13)
- Alkistis Spilioti – artwork
- Dimitris Swartch – styling
- Posidonas Yiannopoulos – production manager
