= Vres Enan Tropo =

Studio album by Peggy Zina
- Released: May 30, 2002
- Genre: Modern laika
- Length: 51:21
- Label: Nitro Music
- Producer: Vangelis Yannopoulos

Peggy Zina chronology
Ena Hadi (2001)	Vres Enan Tropo (2002)	Mazi Sou (2003)

Singles from Vres Enan Tropo
- 1. "Love Is a Wonderful Thing" Released: March 26, 2002; 2. "Vres Enan Tropo" Released: June 22, 2002; 3. "Tolmas Ki'eheis Parapono Esy" Released: July 27, 2002; 4. "Pes Mou Ego Ti Ftaio" Released: October 28, 2002

Vres Enan Tropo (Greek: Βρες έναν τρόπο; English: Find a way) is the title of the fourth studio album by the popular Greek artist Peggy Zina, released in 2002 by Nitro Music. The album went gold several months after release.

== Track listing ==
No.	Title	Lyrics	Music	Length
1.	"Vres Ena Tropo" (Βρές ένα τρόπο; Find a way)	Vangelis Kostantinidis	Kostantinos Pantzis	4:18
2.	"Pes Mou Ego Ti Ftaio" (Πές μου εγώ τι φταίω; Says what I blame)	Vangelis Kostantinidis	Kostantinos Pantzis	3:57
3.	"Tolmas Ki'eheis Parapono Esy" (Τολμάς και έχεις παράπονο, εσύ?; Boldnesses and you have complaint, you?)	Natalia Germanou	Petros Imvrios	3:33
4.	"Pali" (Πάλι; Again)	Ilias Filippou	Kostantinos Panzis	4:32
5.	"Kai Pao Sta Skiladika" (Και πάω στα σκυλάδικα; And go in house)	Yiannis Parios	Yiannis Parios	4:07
6.	"Den Glitono Apo Sena" (Δεν γλυτώνω από σένα; I do not pull through on you)	Ilias Filippou	Tasos Panagis	3:07
7.	"Party" (Πάρτυ; Party)	Vangelis Kostantinidis	Alexsandros Palamaras & Don Taylor	3:40
8.	"Den Se Hreiazomai" (Δεν σε χρειάζομαι; I do not need you)	Vangelis Kostantinidis	Kostantinos Pantzis	4:52
9.	"Den To Pistevo" (Δεν το πιστεύω; I don't think so)	Giannis Liontis	Yiannis Parios	4:44
10.	"Ta Matia Mou Rota" (Τα μάτια μου ρώτα; My eyes ask)	Yiannis Parios	Yiannis Parios	3:58
11.	"Apopse Fevgo Apo'do" (Απόψε φεύγω από 'δώ; Tonight I leave)	Ilias Filippou	Kostantinos Pantzis	3:20
12.	"Hilies Fores" (Χίλιες φορές; A thousand times)	Yiannis Parios	Yiannis Parios	4:20
13.	"Love Is a Wonderful Thing"	Thanos Kalliris	Thanos Kalliris	3:00

== Singles ==
"Love Is a Wonderful Thing" was the first single released from the album and was Zina's entry in the Greek national final to choose the song and artist to represent Greece in the Eurovision Song Contest 2002. The song was released first as a radio single and then as a three track CD single in March 2002 and went gold.
