= Peggy Zina =

Greek singer (born 1975)

Peggy Zina Πέγκυ Ζήνα
- Born: Panagiota-Calliope Zina; 8 March 1975 (age 51); Athens, Greece
- Origin: Ioannina, Greece
- Genres: Modern laïka, laïka, rock, pop
- Occupation: Singer
- Instrument: Piano
- Years active: 1995–present
- Labels: BMG Greece (1996-2000), Nitro Music (2000-2003), Minos EMI (2003-2019), Heaven Music (2019-2023), Panik Records (2023-present)
- Website: www.peggyzina.com

Panagiota-Calliope Zina (Greek: Παναγιώτα-Καλλιόπη Ζήνα; born 8 March 1975), known professionally as Peggy Zina (Πέγκυ Ζήνα), is a Greek singer. She made her recording debut in 1995 with her self-titled album. She has since released twelve studio albums and is a high-profile artist in the Greek music industry. On 15 March 2010, Alpha TV ranked Zina the 24th top-certified female artist in the nation's phonographic era (since 1960), totalling nine (at the time) platinum and two gold records.

== Biography ==
=== Early life ===
Peggy Zina was born in Athens on March 8, 1975. She began piano lessons at the age of five and studied dancing, particularly the jazz genre. During her teens, Peggy Zina participated in many artistic school activities, including theater and choir. She graduated from the Jeanne D'Arc Academy of Athens. Her father, Giorgos Zinas, died when she was 14 years old at the age of 56. Her mother, Stella Chrysikopoulou, remarried Nikos Tsiftelis, who Zina has credited with raising and supporting her as if he were "her real father."

=== 1995–1999: Debut album and early success ===
Peggy Zina's self-titled debut album was released in 1995 by BMG Greece. The album includes her first hit with the controversial title and lead lyric "An Pas Me Alli Tha Sou Spaso to Kefali" (If you go with another woman I will break your head). She began working with Lefteris Pantazis at the Neraida Club in 1995 and then with Notis Sfakianakis at Gazi club in 1996. She released her second album in 1998 with the title Anevaines (You rose), and recorded a duet with Stelios Rokkos on his single "Eisai O Ilios Mou" ("You Are My Sun). She then worked with Sakis Rouvas at the Vios Vios Club in 1999.

=== 2000–2002: Rise in popularity ===
In 2000, Peggy Zina changed recording companies and signed with Nitro Music and drastically altered her look. On July 4, 2000 she released a four-track CD single titled "Ti Th' Akouso Akoma" (What else will I hear) with the title track being the first single from her third album Ena Hadi (A caress) which was released in 2001. Later that same year she worked with Christos Dantis and Notis Sfakianakis at the Cosmos Club.

On 30 January 2002, she was recommended by Thanos Kalliris to represent Greece in the Eurovision Song Contest. She accepted his proposal to sing a song written by him. On 26 February 2002, she participated in the Greek National Final with the song "Love Is a Wonderful Thing". She took the second place to Michalis Rakintzis with his song "S.A.G.A.P.O." ("I Love You") who went on to finish at a disappointing seventeenth place. The single gained a gold certification in just a few weeks.

Zina released her fourth album Vres Enan Tropo (Find a Way) in 2002. For this album, she cooperated with many famous singers, like Giannis Parios who gave her four modern laïka songs and acknowledged Zina as an important singer of the "laïko" genre. She continued to perform at "Maskes" in Thessaloniki for the third consecutive year and due to its success she repeated the same music program in Athens.

=== 2003–2004: Minos EMI and Mazi Sou ===
After four years with Nitro Music and due to the company's closure, Peggy Zina signed with Minos EMI, to what had been described as a lucrative record deal. She released her fifth album, Mazi Sou (With You) in 2003 which became platinum in just a few weeks, selling over 40,000 copies. The album included two massive hits: "Eimai Kala" ("I'm Fine") and "Dystihos" ("Unfortunately"). Zina broke the record for the most performances at Apollon club by surpassing 100 performances. In the winter of the same year Zina worked alongside Nikos Vertis, Thanos Petrelis, Kostas Karafotis and Apostolia Zoi at Pili Aksiou. Her popular performances helped raise the album Mazi Sou to platinum in January 2004.

=== 2004–2005: Matono and Noima ===
After finishing her performances in Athens, Peggy Zina went to Thessaloniki and worked with the band Fili Gia Panta and many new singers. Working continuously for a year and a half, Peggy Zina released her new album Matono (I'm bleeding) in 2004. Upon return to Athens, she started performing at Apollon for a fourth year, this time alongside Kostas Karafotis and Nino. Peggy Zina received her second platinum certification for Matono and she also won her first Arion Award for the Best Folk (Laiko) Singer of the Year. In Spring 2005, she and Nino performed abroad in Australia and United Kingdom, while in United States and Canada she toured with rising singers Giorgos Lianos and Maro Litra.

In September 2005, Peggy Zina released her seventh album with the title Noima (Meaning) on which she cooperated for the first time with renowned composer Giorgos Theofanous. The album was released with four different covers designed by Konstantinos Rigos. The album became gold from the first day of its release and after a few months it gained platinum certification. Once again she won the Arion Award for Best Folk (Laiko) Singer of the Year.

=== 2006–2007: Ena, Trekse and marriage ===
On 8 December 2006, Zina released Ena (One) which was recorded at Diogenis Studio and gained a platinum certification. It contained many hits like "Ena" (One), "Ego Ta Spao" ("I Break Them") and the summer hit "Eimai Edo" ("I'm Here"). She was also selected by Christos Dantis to perform a duet with him of the song rebetiko "To Teleftaio Potiraki" at his MAD Secret Concert.

Zina married her longtime music manager Giorgos Liras in June 2007 after a ten-year relationship. This was Lira's third marriage. On 4 December 2007, she released the album Trekse (Run). The singles had already been released and gained significant radio airplay as "An Ypirhes Tha Se Horiza" (If you existed I would divorce you) from the hit Mega TV series of the same name and "Trekse" which was presented at the Arion Music Awards. The album achieved gold certification from its first week and made its debut at number 2 on the Greek Albums Chart only behind Mihalis Hatzigiannis's live album. Two additional singles of the album were released simultaneously: "Dio Ksenoi" (Two strangers) and "Kai Meta" (And afterwards). The album certified platinum in its sixth week on the chart and Zina received the certification on 22 January 2008. At the 5th annual MAD Video Music Awards, she performed the song "2 Hearts" and also won the award for "Fashion Icon of the Year" with her song "Trekse".

=== 2008–2009: Best of + and To Pathos Einai Aformi ===
On 24 June 2008, Zina released a two-disc greatest hits compilation titled Best of +. In addition to all the previously released material, the album also includes three new songs penned by Giorgos Moukidis, which have all been released as singles as well. The singles Paradosou ("Surrender") and To Kalokairi ("The Summer") were made into music videos directed by Konstantinos Rigos, and the album was certified gold, with Peggy Zina receiving the award on December 3, 2008, during a certification party at Vox nightclub.

Zina appeared at VOX music hall for the winter season alongside Kostas Korafotis and Nino, the three reuniting as they appeared together in 2004. She recorded her tenth studio album in September 2008.

Originally, Giorgos Moukidis was commissioned to compose and write the entire album, but instead two of his tracks made the final release titled To Pathos Einai Aformi (Passion is a reason) released in May 2009. The leading single "Anatheorisa" ("I Revised") was released to radio stations a month earlier and a music video directed by Konstantinos Rigos premiered on MAD TV. On 21 July, the second single Ela Nihta ("Come Night") was released, and then were released the songs An M'Agapas ("If You Love Me"), "Hanome" ("I'm Lost"), and Se Griza Othoni ("Gray Screen"). That same year, Zina performed at Iera Odos for the winter season alongside Dimitris Mitropanos. The show was a big success and also traveled to Thessaloniki and Nicosia. The album has been certified 2× platinum.

=== 2010–present: Evaisthiti... I Logiki? and motherhood ===
In May 2010, Zina recorded her eleventh studio album titled Evaisthiti... I Logiki (Sensitive... or logical), released 6 October 2010. The album is entirely written by Giannis Christodolopoulos with lyrics by Eleana Vrahali. The song Stis Zois To Party (In life's party), was released in June 2010 as the album's first single. The second single, "Rotisa" ("I Asked"), was released in early September exclusively on Rythmos FM. The album went on to be certified 2× Platinum. On 9 May 2011, Zina released a new digital single titled "Ston Diko Mou Ton Planiti" (Gr. "Στον Δικό Μου Τον Πλανήτη"; On My Own Planet) with an accompanying music video. This single, like the rest of the album also written entirely by Giannis Christodoulopoulos and Eleana Vrahali, will be part of a planned reissue of "Evaisthiti... I Logiki?".

Zina had wanted to be a mother since 2009. She announced that she was three months pregnant with her first child during her April 2011 performance on the premiere of the second season of Greek Idol and announced that she would be giving birth a month later.

During their vacations in July, Giorgos Liras experienced chest pains and was rushed to the hospital. He had undergone a coronary balloon angioplasty ten years prior and although he had begun living a healthier lifestyle since, he continued to smoke cigarettes. He was told that had he waited longer he would be in danger of suffering a heart attack and underwent a quadruple bypass surgery on 25 July. Zina gave birth on 8 October 2011 via cesarean section. She was visited by celebrities such as Psinakis, Dimitris Mitropanos, Amaryllis, Loukas Giorkas, Makis Pounentis, and Eleonora Meleti.

Zina's stepfather died suddenly in the evening of 10 October of an aneurysm. He had no prior significant health issues and had been present at the hospital with the singer earlier that day. She did not actually learn of his death until a day later, as her mother and husband did not want to upset her. She was released from the hospital "Rea" on 12 October.

== Discography ==
=== Studio albums ===
- Peggy Zina (1995)
- Anevaines (1998)
- Ena Hadi (2001)
- Vres Enan Tropo (2002)
- Mazi Sou (2003)
- Matono (2004)
- Noima (2005)
- Ena (2006)
- Trekse (2007)
- To Pathos Einai Aformi (2009)
- Evaisthiti... I Logiki? (2010)
- Sou Hrostao Akoma Ena Klama (2012)
- Para Polla (2015)
- Ela (2018)

=== Live albums ===
- "Peggy Zina LIVE" (2013)

=== CD singles ===
- "Ti Th' Akouso Akoma" (2000)
- "Love Is a Wonderful Thing" (2002)
- "To Mystiko" (2007)
- "Dromo" (2013)

=== Digital singles ===
- Anatheorisa Master Tempo Remix (2009)
- Ena Tragoudi feat. Evridiki (2011)
- Diaisthisi feat. Dimos Anastasiadis (2013)
