= Your Face Sounds Familiar (Greek TV series) series 3 =

Your Face Sounds Familiar
- Season 3
- Winner: Giannis Kritikos
- No. of episodes: 12

Release
- Original network: ANT1
- Original release: April 3 – June 26, 2016

Series chronology
- ← Previous; Series 2 Next → Series 4

Your Face Sounds Familiar is a Greek reality show which aired on ANT1. The third season premiered on April 3, 2016 and at the end of every live, the winner of the night was donating the money from the audience's voting (via phone) to a charity of their choice. In Cyprus, the money were given to "Pankypria Organosi Tyflon" (Pancyprian Organization of the Blind People) organization every week.

== Cast ==
=== Host and Judges ===
The host of the show was Maria Bekatorou and all four judges were replaced by Katerina Papoutsaki, Petros Philippidis, Stamatis Fasoulis and Nikos Moutsinas.

=== Contestants ===
There were ten contestants in total who competed in the third season; five women and five men. Apostolia Zoi first signed to participate on the second series of the show, but cancelled her participation for personal reasons. Zoi revealed this in an interview with "Ego Weekly" Magazine, during her participation on the show.

Celebrity	Occupation	Average score	Status
Giannis Kritikos	Singer	16.7	Winner
Apostolia Zoi	Singer	15.5	Runner-up
Dimos Beke	Singer	17.5	Third place
Mathildi Maggira	TV presenter	18.8	Fourth place
Valandis	Singer	15.1	—N/a
Stamatis Gardelis	Actor	14.8	—N/a
Josephine Wendel	Singer	14	—N/a
Eleni Karakasi	Actor	12.7	—N/a
Othonas Metaxas	Actor	12.4	—N/a
Valeria Kouroupi	Actor	11.6	—N/a

== Performances ==
=== Week 1 ===
The premiere aired on April 3, 2016 and winner of the first live was Valandis with 24 points. Valandis chose to give the money from the audience voting to the organization "Women Without Borders" in Rhodes.

After the judges and contestants' scores, Apostolia and Josephine were tied with 36 points. Philippidis, who was the president of the judges for the week, chose to give the final 8 points to Apostolia and the 7 points to Josephine. After the combined final scores, two contestants had 13 points and other two had 21 points. In each tie, the one who got the highest score from the audience got the highest final place and the one with the lowest got the lowest place.

#	Contestant	Song	Judges and Contestants				Audience	Total	Place
#	Contestant	Song	Judges^{1}	Extra^{2}	Total^{3}	Result^{4}	Audience	Total	Place
1	Apostolia	"All That Jazz" (by Catherine Zeta-Jones)	26 (7, 7, 6, 6)	10	36	8	5	13	7
2	Giannis	"Mikres Nothies" (by Vasilis Papakonstantinou)	34 (9, 9, 7, 9)	—	34	6	9	15	5
3	Josephine	"Hit Me Baby One More Time" (by Britney Spears)	26 (6, 5, 8, 7)	10	36	7	6	13	6
4	Valandis	"I Nychta Myrizei Yiasemi" (by Themis Adamantidis)	44 (11, 11, 11, 11)	5	49	12	12	24	1
5	Eleni	"To Poniro to Antilamvanomai" (by Despina Stylianopoulou)	15 (4, 3, 4, 4)	10	25	5	3	8	9
6	Dimos	"It's a Man's Man's Man's World" / "Get Up (I Feel Like Being a) Sex Machine" (by James Brown)	38 (10, 10, 10, 8)	5	43	10	11	21	2
7	Othonas	"Ilie Mou Se Parakalo" (by George Dalaras)	17 (3, 4, 5, 5)	—	17	3	4	7	10
8	Valeria	"Tha Melaholiso" (by Katy Garbi)	17 (5, 6, 3, 3)	5	22	4	7	11	8
9	Stamatis	"Pirosvestiras" (by Leonidas Balafas)	35 (8, 8, 9, 10)	5	40	9	8	17	4
10	Mathildi	"Ase Me Na Figo" (by Aleka Kanellidou)	48 (12, 12, 12, 12)	—	48	11	10	21	3

=== Week 2 ===
The second episode aired on April 10, 2016 and the winner was Dimos with 24 points. Dimos chose to give the money from the audience voting to Thalassemia Department, Hagia Sophia.

After the judges and contestants' scores, Valeria and Eleni were tied with 22 points, Valandis and Othonas with 25 points and Giannis and Mathildi with 48 points. Moutsinas, who was the president of the judges for the week, chose to give the final 3 points to Valeria and the 4 points to Eleni, the final 5 points to Valandis and the 6 points to Othonas and the final 10 points to Mathildi and the 11 to Giannis. After the combined final scores, four contestants had 11 points. In tie, the one who got the highest score from the audience got the highest final place, the one with the second highest score from the audience the second highest final place and so on.

#	Contestant	Song	Judges and Contestants				Audience	Total	Place
#	Contestant	Song	Judges^{1}	Extra^{2}	Total^{3}	Result^{4}	Audience	Total	Place
1	Valeria	"Whenever, Wherever" (by Shakira)	17 (3, 7, 3, 4)	5	22	3	8	11	6
2	Dimos	"Apo to aeroplano" (by Kostas Hatzis)	45 (12, 10, 11, 12)	15	60	12	12	24	1
3	Giannis	"Madame (Padam Padam)" (by Panos Mouzourakis)	43 (11, 12, 10, 10)	5	48	11	11	22	2
4	Eleni	"Stoichimatizo" (by Mando)	22 (6, 6, 7, 3)	—	22	4	6	10	10
5	Stamatis	"Ora na pigaino" (by Nikos Oikonomopoulos)	35 (7, 5, 12, 11)	—	35	9	9	18	3
6	Apostolia	"Exairountai" (by Angela Dimitriou)	31 (9, 8, 9, 5)	—	31	7	4	11	8
7	Valandis	"Super Freak" (by Rick James)	20 (5, 3, 4, 8)	5	25	5	10	15	5
8	Josephine	"Den pantrevomai" (by Litsa Diamanti)	29 (8, 9, 6, 6)	5	34	8	3	11	9
9	Othonas	"Susanna" (by Adriano Celentano)	20 (4, 4, 5, 7)	5	25	6	5	11	7
10	Mathildi	"Enigma (Give a Bit of Mmh to Me)" (by Amanda Lear)	38 (10, 11, 8, 9)	10	48	10	7	17	4

=== Week 3 ===
The third episode aired on April 17, 2016 and the winner was Mathildi with 24 points. Mathildi chose to give the money from the audience voting to the "Rehabilitation Center for Children" at Voula.

The Secret Guest of the evening was Isaias Matiaba, who transformed into Adele and sang "Hello".

#	Contestant	Song	Judges and Contestants				Audience	Total	Place
#	Contestant	Song	Judges^{1}	Extra^{2}	Total^{3}	Result^{4}	Audience	Total	Place
1	Eleni	"All About That Bass" (by Meghan Trainor)	16 (5, 4, 3, 4)	5	21	4	3	7	10
2	Giannis	"Mundian To Bach Ke" (by Panjabi MC)	35 (11, 9, 6, 9)	—	35	10	10	20	2
3	Valeria	"Sou Milo kai Kokkinizeis" (by Giannis Haroulis)	25 (10, 7, 5, 3)	5	30	6	4	10	8
4	Valandis	"Maria me ta Kitrina" (by Dimitra Galani)	31 (3, 8, 9, 11)	—	31	7	8	15	6
5	Stamatis	"Dreamer" (by Ozzy Osbourne of Black Sabbath)	26 (6, 5, 7, 8)	—	26	5	11	16	5
6	Othonas	"Gia ta Matia tou Kosmou" (by Christos Avgerinos)	32 (8, 6, 8, 10)	—	32	8	9	17	4
7	Josephine	"Dirrty" (by Christina Aguilera)	37 (9, 11, 10, 7)	—	37	11	7	18	3
8	Dimos	"O Kir Mentios" (by Georgia Vasileiadou)	16 (4, 3, 4, 5)	—	16	3	6	9	9
9	Apostolia	"En Lefko" (by Natasa Bofiliou)	34 (7, 10, 11, 6)	—	34	9	5	14	7
10	Mathildi	"I Modistra" (by Rena Vlahopoulou)	48 (12, 12, 12, 12)	40	88	12	12	24	1

=== Week 4 ===
The fourth episode aired on April 24, 2016 and the winner was Othonas with 23 points. Othonas chose to give the money from the audience voting to the Panhellenic Association of Transplanted Hearts and Lungs, "I Skytali" at Nea Smyrni.

After the judges and contestants' scores, Apostolia and Josephine were tied with 43 points. Fasoulis, who was the president of the judges for the week, chose to give the final 9 points to Apostolia and the 10 points to Josephine. After the combined final scores, three contestants had 12 points. In tie, the one who got the highest score from the audience got the highest final place, the one with the second highest score from the audience the second highest final place and the one with the third highest score from the audience the last final place of the three.

The Secret Guest of the evening was Mary Sinatsaki, who transformed into Eleni Foureira and sang "Reggaeton".

#	Contestant	Song	Judges and Contestants				Audience	Total	Place
#	Contestant	Song	Judges^{1}	Extra^{2}	Total^{3}	Result^{4}	Audience	Total	Place
1	Valandis	"Tsikoulata" (by Giorgos Xanthiotis)	45 (11, 11, 11, 12)	10	55	11	6	17	3
2	Apostolia	"Crazy in Love" (by Beyoncé)	38 (10, 10, 8, 10)	5	43	9	3	12	9
3	Eleni	"Perasmenes Mou Agapes" (by Mary Lynda)	28 (7, 6, 7, 8)	—	28	7	7	14	5
4	Stamatis	"De Sou Aniko" (by Stan)	17 (6, 4, 4, 3)	5	23	4	12	16	4
5	Josephine	"Let Her Go" (by Passenger)	38 (9, 9, 9, 11)	5	43	10	10	20	2
6	Othonas	"You Are My Destiny" (by Paul Anka)	45 (12, 12, 12, 9)	20	65	12	11	23	1
7	Valeria	"Den Exei Arxi" (by Tzeni Karezi)	25 (5, 7, 6, 7)	5	30	8	4	12	8
8	Dimos	"Aniko Se Mena" (by Giorgos Mazonakis)	25 (4, 5, 10, 6)	—	25	5	8	13	6
9	Giannis	"Matia Vourkomena" (by Dimitris Papamihail)	13 (3, 3, 3, 4)	—	13	3	9	12	7
10	Mathildi	"Stin Pyra" (by Anna Vissi)	26 (8, 8, 5, 5)	—	26	6	5	11	10

=== Week 5: Eurovision Night ===
Few days before the live show, one of the contestants (Metaxas) was transmitted to the hospital and diagnosed with gallstone. Metaxas followed conservative treatment and did not have to have any surgical procedure. The incident did not affect his performance on the show, since he returned and performed live on May 8, 2016.

The fifth episode aired on May 8, 2016 and the winner was Apostolia with 24 points. Apostolia chose to give the money from the audience voting to the non-profit organization "I Kivotos tou Kosmou".

After the judges and contestants' scores, Josephine, Dimos and Othonas were tied with 20 points. Papoutsaki, who was the president of the judges for the week, chose to give the final 4 points to Othonas, the 5 points Josephine and the 6 points to Dimos. After the combined final scores, there were three ties; two contestants tied with 19 points, two contestants with 17 points and two contestants with 11 points. In tie, the one who got the highest score from the audience got the highest final place and the one with the second highest score from the audience the second highest final place in each tie respectively.

The Secret Guest of the evening was Costas Doxas, who transformed into Peggy Zina and sang Zina's entry in 2002 Greek Final, "Love Is A Wonderful Thing". Doxas was the runner-up of the second series of the show. Also, Dafni Bokota was a guest judge of the evening commenting on the contestants' performances, but she did not score them at the end.

#	Contestant	Song	Judges and Contestants				Audience	Total	Place
#	Contestant	Song	Judges^{1}	Extra^{2}	Total^{3}	Result^{4}	Audience	Total	Place
1	Josephine	"My Number One" (by Helena Paparizou)	20 (6, 5, 5, 4)	—	20	5	11	16	6
2	Eleni	"Sokrati" (by Elpida)	38 (10, 9, 11, 8)	15	53	11	8	19	3
3	Giannis	"Alcohol Is Free" (by Koza Mostra feat. Agathonas Iakovidis)	42 (11, 11, 10, 10)	—	42	9	10	19	2
4	Stamatis	"Alcohol Is Free" (by Koza Mostra feat. Agathonas Iakovidis)	33 (8, 8, 8, 9)	15	48	10	7	17	5
5	Mathildi	"Rise Like a Phoenix" (by Conchita Wurst)	40 (9, 10, 9, 12)	—	40	8	9	17	4
6	Valandis	"Volare" (by Domenico Modugno)	27 (7, 6, 7, 7)	—	27	7	4	11	8
7	Apostolia	"Secret Combination" (by Kalomira Sarantis)	47 (12, 12, 12, 11)	15	62	12	12	24	1
8	Dimos	"Never Let You Go" (by Dima Bilan)	20 (4, 7, 4, 5)	—	20	6	5	11	7
9	Valeria	"Stop" (by Bang)	13 (3, 4, 3, 3)	5	18	3	3	6	10
10	Othonas	"Hold Me Now" (by Johnny Logan)	20 (5, 3, 6, 6)	—	20	4	6	10	9

=== Week 6 ===
The sixth episode aired on May 15, 2016 and the winner was Dimos with 24 points. Dimos chose to give the money from the audience voting to Thalassemia Department, Hagia Sophia.

After the combined final scores, two contestants had 13 points. The one who got the highest score from the audience got the highest final place and the one with the lowest got the lowest place.

The Secret Guest of the evening was Melina Makris, who transformed into Lady Gaga and sang "Poker Face".

#	Contestant	Song	Judges and Contestants				Audience	Total	Place
#	Contestant	Song	Judges^{1}	Extra^{2}	Total^{3}	Result^{4}	Audience	Total	Place
1	Stamatis	"Supercalifragilisticexpialidocious" (by Julie Andrews)	18 (4, 6, 4, 4)	—	18	4	5	9	8
2	Dimos	"Echo Provlima Iyeias" (by Elias Psinakis)	48 (12, 12, 12, 12)	20	68	12	12	24	1
3	Valandis	"Pou'sai Thanasi" (by Giorgos Zampetas)	30 (7, 7, 7, 9)	—	30	7	6	13	7
4	Mathildi	"Protos Sto Scholio (Terataki)" (by TUS)	42 (10, 11, 11, 10)	5	47	10	8	18	4
5	Eleni	"The Winner Takes It All" (by Meryl Streep)	34 (11, 8, 8, 7)	10	44	9	11	20	3
6	Valeria	"To Agori" (by Marina)	19 (6, 5, 3, 5)	—	19	5	3	8	9
7	Giannis	"Opa Nina" (by Momo Chan & Pyramidos)	38 (8, 9, 10, 11)	15	53	11	10	21	2
8	Othonas	"Kai Se Thelo" (by Sakis Rouvas)	21 (5, 4, 6, 6)	—	21	6	7	13	6
9	Josephine	"To Mono Pou Thimamai" (by Evridiki)	14 (3, 3, 5, 3)	—	14	3	4	7	10
10	Apostolia	"Pastor" (by Teresa Salgueiro)	36 (9, 10, 9, 8)	—	36	8	9	17	5

=== Week 7 ===
The seventh episode aired on May 22, 2016 and the winner was Apostolia with 23 points. Apostolia chose to give the money from the audience voting to the non-profit organization "I Kivotos tou Kosmou".

After the combined final scores, there were three ties; three contestants tied with 18 points, two contestants with 14 points and two contestants with 9 points. In each tie, the one who got the highest score from the audience got the highest final place, the one with the second highest score from the audience the second highest final place and so on.

Due to the parliamentary elections, the show was not broadcast live in Cyprus and Cypriots were not able to vote for this week.

#	Contestant	Song	Judges and Contestants				Audience	Total	Place
#	Contestant	Song	Judges^{1}	Extra^{2}	Total^{3}	Result^{4}	Audience	Total	Place
1	Giannis	"Cose della vita" (by Eros Ramazzotti)	21 (4, 4, 5, 8)	5	26	6	3	9	10
2	Othonas	"O Paliatzis" (by Stratos Dionysiou)	40 (9, 10, 11, 10)	5	45	10	4	14	7
3	Dimos	"Uptown Funk" (by Bruno Mars)	33 (10, 9, 7, 7)	—	33	8	10	18	2
4	Mathildi	"Ta Limania" (by Poly Panou)	43 (11, 11, 10, 11)	15	58	12	6	18	4
5	Josephine	"Don't Stop the Music" (by Rihanna)	29 (8, 8, 8, 5)	—	29	7	7	14	6
6	Valeria	"Melisses" (by Foteini Velesiotou)	12 (3, 3, 3, 3)	5	17	3	8	11	8
7	Apostolia	"What a Wonderful World" (by Louis Armstrong)	48 (12, 12, 12, 12)	5	53	11	12	23	1
8	Valandis	"Tou Agoriou Apenanti" (by Mary Chronopoulou)	32 (7, 7, 9, 9)	10	42	9	9	18	3
9	Stamatis	"Fila me" (by Stamatis Kraounakis)	22 (5, 5, 6, 6)	—	22	4	5	9	9
10	Eleni	"Paraggelia"/"Enos Leptou Sigi" (by Vasilis Terlegas)	20 (6, 6, 4, 4)	5	25	5	11	16	5

=== Week 8 ===
The eighth episode aired on May 29, 2016 and the winner was Stamatis with 24 points. Stamatis chose to give the money from the audience voting to the non-profit organization "Paidia tis Gis".

After the combined final scores, there was a tie with four contestants getting 16 points. The one who got the highest score from the audience got the highest final place, the one with the second highest score from the audience the second highest final place and so on.

#	Contestant	Song	Judges and Contestants				Audience	Total	Place
#	Contestant	Song	Judges^{1}	Extra^{2}	Total^{3}	Result^{4}	Audience	Total	Place
1	Eleni	"Kormi ki Alati" (by Bessy Argyraki)	36 (8, 9, 9, 10)	—	36	8	7	15	7
2	Giannis	"Ax Evropi" (by Tzimis Panousis)	32 (7, 8, 8, 9)	5	37	9	11	20	2
3	Valeria	"Ti Eixame, Ti Xasame" (by Efi Sarri)	41 (11, 11, 11, 8)	20	61	11	5	16	6
4	Valandis	"Kalimera Ellada" (by Nivo)	26 (6, 7, 7, 6)	—	26	6	10	16	3
5	Apostolia	"Pos to Trivoun to Piperi" (by Domna Samiou)	21 (5, 6, 5, 5)	—	21	5	8	14	8
6	Mathildi	"Goldfinger" (by Shirley Bassey)	41 (10, 10, 10, 11)	—	41	10	6	16	5
7	Dimos	"To Oraiotero Plasma" / "Einai Asteio" / "Ston Evdomo Ourano" / "Magika Xalia" (by Lefteris Pantazis)	25 (9, 5, 4, 7)	5	30	7	9	16	4
8	Stamatis	"Prigkipessa" (by Sokratis Malamas)	48 (12, 12, 12, 12)	15	63	12	12	24	1
9	Othonas	"I Was Made for Lovin' You" (by Kiss)	18 (4, 4, 6, 4)	—	18	4	3	7	10
10	Josephine	"Opa Opa" (by Notis Sfakianakis)	12 (3, 3, 3, 3)	5	17	3	4	7	9

=== Week 9 ===
The ninth episode aired on June 5, 2016 and the winner was Eleni with 24 points. Eleni chose to give the money from the audience voting to the society club "Pisti".

After the combined final scores, there was a tie with two contestants getting 13 points. The one who got the highest score from the audience got the highest final place and the one with the second highest score from the audience the second highest final place.

#	Contestant	Song	Judges and Contestants				Audience	Total	Place
#	Contestant	Song	Judges^{1}	Extra^{2}	Total^{3}	Result^{4}	Audience	Total	Place
1	Josephine	"Let It Go" (by Idina Menzel)	21 (4, 7, 5, 5)	—	21	4	8	12	8
2	Othonas	"Karagouna/Ksekina Mia Psaropoula" (by Nana Mouskouri)	17 (5, 4, 4, 4)	5	22	5	5	10	9
3	Mathildi	"Frozen" (by Madonna)	43 (11, 10, 11, 11)	10	53	11	11	22	2
4	Stamatis	"Ginetai (Ma De Ginetai)" (by Antonis Remos)	12 (3, 3, 3, 3)	—	12	3	4	7	10
5	Eleni	"I Dreamed a Dream" (by Susan Boyle)	48 (12, 12, 12, 12)	25	73	12	12	24	1
6	Giannis	"To Melachrinaki" (by Xanthi Peraki)	24 (6, 6, 6, 6)	—	24	6	7	13	6
7	Dimos	"When a Man Loves a Woman" (by Michael Bolton of Blackjack)	29 (7, 8, 7, 7)	—	29	7	10	17	4
8	Apostolia	"Love Me like You Do" (by Ellie Goulding)	40 (10, 11, 9, 10)	—	40	10	3	13	7
9	Valandis	"Fisaei Poli" (by Giannis Ploutarhos)	32 (8, 5, 10, 9)	5	37	8	6	14	5
10	Valeria	"I Hate Myself for Loving You" (by Joan Jett)	34 (9, 9, 8, 8)	5	39	9	9	18	3

=== Week 10 ===
The tenth episode aired on June 12, 2016 and the winner was Mathildi with 24 points. Mathildi chose to give the money from the audience voting to the "Rehabilitation Center for Children" at Voula.

After the judges and contestants' scores, Apostolia and Valeria were tied with 28 points. Fasoulis, who was the president of the judges for the week, chose to give the final 7 points to Valeria and the 6 points to Apostolia.

#	Contestant	Song	Judges and Contestants				Audience	Total	Place
#	Contestant	Song	Judges^{1}	Extra^{2}	Total^{3}	Result^{4}	Audience	Total	Place
1	Valandis	"Eisai Magkas Rei!" (by Tonis Sfinos)	26 (5, 7, 6, 8)	—	26	5	6	11	8
2	Eleni	"Can't Feel My Face" (by The Weeknd)	20 (6, 6, 4, 4)	—	20	4	3	7	10
3	Giannis	"O Makrimallis" (by Giannis Zouganelis)	19 (4, 5, 3, 7)	—	19	3	9	12	7
4	Dimos	"La Vida Es Un Carnaval" (by Celia Cruz)	40 (11, 10, 10, 9)	5	45	9	10	19	3
5	Mathildi	"Non, je ne regrette rien" (by Édith Piaf)	48 (12, 12, 12, 12)	5	53	12	12	24	1
6	Apostolia	"November Rain" (by Axl Rose of Guns N' Roses)	28 (7, 9, 7, 5)	—	28	6	4	10	9
7	Valeria	"To Moro" (by Doukissa)	23 (8, 4, 8, 3)	5	28	7	7	14	5
8	Josephine	"Shake It Off" (by Taylor Swift)	37 (10, 8, 9, 10)	15	52	11	11	22	2
9	Stamatis	"Siga Min Klapso" (by Giannis Aggelakas)	42 (9, 11, 11, 11)	5	47	10	8	18	4
10	Othonas	"Gia Pou To'vales Kardia Mou" (by Orfeas Peridis)	17 (3, 3, 5, 6)	15	32	8	5	13	6

=== Week 11: Semi-finals ===
The eleventh episode aired on June 19, 2016 and the winner was Apostolia with 24 points. Apostolia chose to give the money from the audience voting to the non-profit organization "I Kivotos tou Kosmou".

After the combined final scores, there were three ties; two contestants tied with 21 points, two with 12 points and two with 11 points. In each tie, the one who got the highest score from the audience got the highest final place and the one with the second highest score from the audience the second highest final place.

In the semi-finals, the four contestants with the highest cumulative scores from all 11 weeks were announced and were the ones to compete in the finals. The four finalists were; Mathildi Maggira with 207 points, Dimos Beke with 192 points, Giannis Kritikos with 184 points and Apostolia Zoi with 174 points. The remaining six players will perform in duets but they will not get scored. It was also the last time the judges were going to score the contestants since the winner is decided only by the audience.

#	Contestant	Song	Judges and Contestants				Audience	Total	Place
#	Contestant	Song	Judges^{1}	Extra^{2}	Total^{3}	Result^{4}	Audience	Total	Place
1	Valeria	"Gigi in Paradisco" (by Dalida)	22 (8, 6, 4, 4)	—	22	5	6	11	8
2	Josephine	"Bring Me to Life" (by Evanescence)	31 (7, 8, 6, 10)	—	31	7	7	14	5
3	Giannis	"I Fani" (by Vasilis Kazoulis)	36 (10, 10, 7, 9)	10	46	11	10	21	2
4	Apostolia	"Try" (by Pink)	48 (12, 12, 12, 12)	10	58	12	12	24	1
5	Valandis	"Pote Voudas Pote Koudas" (by Nikos Papazoglou)	24 (4, 5, 8, 7)	15	39	8	4	12	7
6	Othonas	"Blue Hotel" (by Chris Isaak)	30 (6, 7, 9, 8)	—	30	6	5	11	9
7	Stamatis	"Ax Ellada S'agapo" (by Manolis Rasoulis)	15 (3, 3, 3, 6)	5	20	4	8	12	6
8	Dimos	"I'd Do Anything for Love (But I Won't Do That)" (by Meat Loaf)	33 (9, 9, 10, 5)	10	43	9	11	20	3
9	Eleni	"Be My Baby" (by Bette Midler)	17 (5, 4, 5, 3)	—	17	3	3	6	10
10	Mathildi	"Mi Mou Ksanafigeis Pia" (by Sotiria Bellou)	44 (11, 11, 11, 11)	—	44	10	9	19	4

=== Week 12: Finals ===
The twelfth and final live aired on June 26, 2016 and the winner of the show was Giannis Kritikos. The income from the audience voting for the final, was divided in ten equal parts and was given to all ten foundations that the contestants were representing during the twelve live shows.

At the beginning of the show, Bekatorou performed the songs "Roz Bikini" and "Pame Gia Trelles Stis Seychelles" by Polina. During her performance, Polina herself joined her and continued performing together.

The six contestants who did not compete in the finals, received a special award for their participation on the show.

#	Contestant	Song	Result^{5}
1	Giannis	"Htane Mia Fora" (by Nikos Xilouris)	Winner
2	Apostolia	"Mama Gernao" (by Tania Tsanaklidou)	Runner-up
3	Dimos	"Always on My Mind" / "Suspicious Minds" / "Blue Suede Shoes" (by Elvis Presley)	3rd place
4	Mathildi	"Dangerous" / "Beat It" (by Michael Jackson)	4th place
5/6	Eleni-Valeria	"No More Tears (Enough Is Enough)" (by Barbra Streisand & Donna Summer)	Did; Not; Scored
7/8	Stamatis-Valandis	"Epapses Agapi na Thimizeis" (by Pyx Lax)	Did; Not; Scored
9/10	Josephine-Othonas	"O Oraios kai H Oraia" (by Katerina Kouka & Antonis Kafetzopoulos)	Did; Not; Scored

Notes
1. The points that judges gave in order (Moutsinas, Papoutsaki, Fasoulis, Philippidis).
2. Each contestant gave 5 points to a contestant of their choice.
3. Total of both extra and judges' score.
4. Result of both extra and judges' score.
5. In the final, only the audience voted for the winner and the one with the most votes won the competition.

== Results chart ==
Contestant	Wk 1	Wk 2	Wk 3	Wk 4	Wk 5	Wk 6	Wk 7	Wk 8	Wk 9	Wk 10	Wk 11	WK 12	WK 13	WK 14	Week 15	Total	Average
Jamie Rivera	7th 14 points	7th 11 points	9th 9 points	10th 8 points	8th 13 points	3rd 21 points	4th 17 points	7th 14 points	7th 12 points	7th 14 points	2nd 20 points	3rd 20 points	7th 11 points	8th 12 points	—	196	15.07
Joey Generoso	9th 12 points	6th 13 points	8th 12 points	8th 12 points	3rd 18 points	8th 10 points	10th 7 points	6th 14 points	5th 14 points	8th 12 points	8th 10 points	10th 8 points	9th 9 points	6th 15 points	—	166	12.76
Katrina Velarde	2nd 18 points	8th 11 points	5th 16 points	7th 14 points	5th 16 points	7th 12 points	3rd 20 points	3rd 18 points	10th 8 points	4th 15 points	5th 16 points	5th 16 points	4th 18 points	2nd 20 points	1st	218	16.76
Sheryn Regis	4th 16 points	4th 17 points	7th 13 points	4th 16 points	4th 17 points	6th 15 points	6th 14 points	8th 13 points	6th 13 points	3rd 18 points	9th 9 points	7th 12 points	1st 24 points	4th 19 points	—	216	16.61
Christian Bautista	5th 14 points	5th 16 points	4th 16 points	9th 10 points	6th 15 points	5th 15 points	8th 11 points	4th 16 points	9th 8 points	5th 14 points	3rd 18 points	8th 9 points	10th 8 points	9th 7 points	—	177	13.61
Nina Girado	10th 7 points	3rd 20 points	3rd 18 points	3rd 18 points	10th 7 points	2nd 21 points	5th 14 points	2nd 22 points	8th 11 points	6th 14 points	4th 17 points	9th 9 points	6th 13 points	10th 7 points	—	198	15.23
Vilma Santos-Recto	8th 14 points	2nd 23 points	2nd 22 points	6th 14 points	9th 8 points	4th 20 points	7th 13 points	10th 7 points	3rd 21 points	9th 11 points	7th 14 points	4th 18 points	8th 10 points	1st 21 points	—	216	16.61
Kuh Ledesma	6th 14 points	1st 23 points	1st 24 points	5th 15 points	7th 14 points	9th 8 points	2nd 21 points	5th 15 points	2nd 21 points	10th 6 points	1st 24 points	2nd 20 points	5th 15 points	7th 13 points	4th	233	17.92
Boboy Garrovillo	3rd 17 points	10th 7 points	6th 14 points	1st 22 points	2nd 18 points	10th 6 points	1st 23 points	9th 8 points	1st 23 points	2nd 22 points	6th 14 points	6th 14 points	3rd 20 points	5th 17 points	3rd	225	17.30
Jim Paredes	1st 24 points	9th 9 points	10th 6 points	2nd 21 points	1st 24 points	1st 22 points	9th 10 points	1st 23 points	4th 19 points	1st 24 points	10th 8 points	1st 24 points	2nd 22 points	3rd 19 points	2nd	255	19.61

indicates the contestant came first that week.
indicates the contestant came last that week.
performed but didn't score
indicates the winning contestant.
indicates the runner-up contestant.
indicates the third-place contestant.
indicates the fourth-place contestant.

== Ratings ==
#	Episode	Date	Ratings (total)	Ratings (ages 15–44)	Source
1	Week 1	April 3, 2014	39.7%	42.2%	
2	Week 2	April 10, 2014	33.7%	35.7%	
3	Week 3	April 17, 2016	34.3%	36.4%	
4	Week 4	April 24, 2016	35.7%	35.5%	
5	Week 5	May 8, 2016	29.5%	30.3%	
6	Week 6	May 15, 2016	30.4%	30.4%	
7	Week 7	May 22, 2016	31.1%	30.1%	
8	Week 8	May 29, 2016	34.6%	34.8%	
9	Week 9	June 5, 2016	33.7%	33.2%	
10	Week 10	June 13, 2016	24.5%	24.8%	
11	Week 11	June 19, 2016	26.7%	26.2%	
12	Week 12	June 26, 2016	32.2%	31.45%	
