= Your Face Sounds Familiar (Greek TV series) series 4 =

Your Face Sounds Familiar
- Season 4
- Winner: Giannis Chatzigeorgiou
- No. of episodes: 12

Release
- Original network: ANT1
- Original release: April 23 – July 13, 2017

Series chronology
- ← Previous; Series 3 Next → Series 5

Your Face Sounds Familiar is a Greek reality show airing on ANT1. The fourth season started on April 23, 2017. The contestants are evaluated by the show's judges, the audience and the other contestants. The contestant who gathers the highest score in each live (winner of the night), is able to donate the money that is collected from the audience's voting to a charity of their choice. In Cyprus, the money were given to "Pankypria Organosi Tyflon" (Pancyprian Organization of the Blind People) organization every week.

== Cast ==
=== Host and Judges ===
The host of the show was Maria Bekatorou and the four judges will be Elli Kokkinou, Stamatis Fassoulis, Fotis Sergoulopoulos and Nikos Moutsinas.

=== Contestants ===
Ten contestants in total competed in the fourth season; four women and six men:

Celebrity	Occupation	Average score	Status
Giannis Chatzigeorgiou	Actor, Singer	18.1	First place
Isaias Matiaba	Singer	17.8	Second place
Aris Makris	Singer	17.2	Third place
Parthena Horozidou	Actress	17.1	Fourth place
Dimitris Makalias	Actor, TV presenter	15.9	—N/a
Antonis Dominos	Singer	15.3	—N/a
Konnie Metaxa	Singer	14.4	—N/a
Irene Trost	Singer	13	—N/a
Giannis Chatzopoulos	Singer	11.3	—N/a
Sabrina	Singer	9.4	—N/a

== Performances ==
=== Week 1 ===
The premiere aired on April 23, 2017 and winner of the first live was Isaias with 22 points. Isaias chose to give the money from the audience voting to the organization "Syllogos Iliachtida" in Agrinio.

After the judges and contestants' scores, Giannis Chatzigeorgiou, Giannis Chatzopoulos and Antonis were tied with 24 points. Kokkinou, who was the president of the judges for the week, chose to give the final 6 points to Giannis Chatzopoulos, the 5 points to Antonis and the 4 points to Giannis Chatzigeorgiou. After the combined final scores, two contestants had 14 points and other three had 12 points. In each tie, the one who got the highest score from the audience got the highest final place and the one with the lowest got the lowest place.

#	Contestant	Song	Judges and Contestants				Audience	Total	Place
#	Contestant	Song	Judges^{1}	Extra^{2}	Total^{3}	Result^{4}	Audience	Total	Place
1	Giannis Chatzig.	"Love Yourself" (by Justin Bieber)	19 (5, 4, 6, 4)	5	24	4	12	16	4
2	Konnie	"Be Italian" (by Fergie of The Black Eyed Peas)	30 (8, 6, 8, 8)	5	35	8	6	14	6
3	Giannis Chatzop.	"Pes pos m'antamoses" (by Stamatis Kokotas)	19 (6, 5, 3, 5)	5	24	6	4	10	10
4	Dimitris	"Wrecking Ball" (by Miley Cyrus)	39 (11, 9, 9, 10)	10	49	10	8	18	3
5	Antonis	"Start Me Up" (by Mick Jagger of The Rolling Stones)	24 (4, 7, 7, 6)	—	24	5	7	12	7
6	Isaias	"Ki Emeina Edo" (by Babis Stokas)	44 (10, 11, 11, 12)	15	59	12	10	22	1
7	Sabrina	"I've Seen That Face Before (Libertango)" (by Grace Jones)	43 (12, 12, 12, 7)	—	43	9	3	12	9
8	Aris	"Wake Me Up Before You Go-Go" (by George Michael of Wham!)	13 (3, 3, 4, 3)	—	13	3	11	14	5
9	Irene	"Lost on You" (by LP)	29 (7, 8, 5, 9)	—	29	7	5	12	8
10	Parthena	"Einai gata" (by Rita Sakellariou)	41 (9, 11, 10, 11)	10	51	11	9	20	2

=== Week 2 ===
The second episode aired on April 30, 2017 and the winner was Giannis Chatzigeorgiou with 22 points. Chatzigeorgiou chose to give the money from audience to "The Smile of the Child". After the combined final scores, two contestants had 23 points and two contestants had 11 points. The one who got the highest score from the audience got the highest final place out of the two in both situations.

The Secret Guest of the evening was Dimitris Ouggarezos, who transformed into Elvis Presley and sang "Viva Las Vegas".

#	Contestant	Song	Judges and Contestants				Audience	Total	Place
#	Contestant	Song	Judges^{1}	Extra^{2}	Total^{3}	Result^{4}	Audience	Total	Place
1	Dimitris	"Lola" (by Kostis Maraveyas)	21 (4, 5, 8, 4)	—	21	5	6	11	9
2	Sabrina	"Apone" (by Martha Karagianni)	15 (5, 4, 3, 3)	—	15	3	3	6	10
3	Konnie	"Min Antistekese" (by Sakis Rouvas)	25 (7, 6, 4, 8)	5	30	6	10	16	4
4	Giannis Chatzig.	"Sweet Dreams (Are Made of This)" (by Marilyn Manson)	39 (10, 10, 10, 9)	10	49	10	12	22	1
5	Isaias	"Kalispera" (by Antypas)	16 (3, 3, 5, 5)	—	16	4	8	12	7
6	Antonis	"Kiss from a Rose" (by Seal)	41 (11, 11, 9, 10)	15	56	12	5	17	3
7	Irene	"Ain't Your Mama" (by Jennifer Lopez)	29 (8, 7, 7, 7)	5	34	8	4	12	8
8	Giannis Chatzop.	"Sto Kato-Kato Tis Grafis" (by Yiannis Parios)	48 (12, 12, 12, 12)	—	48	9	7	16	6
9	Aris	"You Give Love a Bad Name" (by Jon Bon Jovi of Bon Jovi)	40 (9, 9, 11, 11)	10	50	11	11	22	2
10	Parthena	"Cheap Thrills" (by Sia)	26 (6, 8, 6, 6)	5	31	7	9	16	5

=== Week 3: Eurovision Night ===
The third episode aired on May 7, 2017 and the winner was Isaias with 21 points. Isaias chose to give the money from the audience voting to the organization "Syllogos Iliachtida" in Agrinio. After the combined final scores, two contestants had 19 points. The one who got the highest score from the audience got the highest final place out of the two in both situations.

The Secret Guests of the evening were Loukas Giorkas, who helped Dimitris Makalias with his transformation and sang his song "Watch My Dance" and Alexis Kostalas, the long-time Greek spokesman who announced the votes for Greece between 1998 and 2010.

Also, Fotis Sergoulopoulos transformed into Alexander Rybak and sang "Fairytale", the 2009 winning song.

#	Contestant	Song	Judges and Contestants				Audience	Total	Place
#	Contestant	Song	Judges^{1}	Extra^{2}	Total^{3}	Result^{4}	Audience	Total	Place
1	Aris	"Gimme" (by One)	34 (7, 9, 9, 9)	5	39	8	11	19	4
2	Antonis	"Ne partez pas sans moi" (by Céline Dion)	41 (8, 12, 10, 11)	—	41	9	7	16	5
3	Dimitris	"Watch My Dance" (by Loukas Giorkas feat. Stereo Mike)	36 (11, 4, 11, 10)	20	56	12	8	20	2
4	Isaias	"My Słowianie" (by Donatan & Cleo)	47 (12, 11, 12, 12)	5	52	11	10	21	1
5	Giannis Chatzig.	"Baila el Chiki-chiki" (by Rodolfo Chikilicuatre)	35 (9, 10, 8, 8)	—	35	7	12	19	3
6	Irene	"Après toi" (by Vicky Leandros)	19 (4, 7, 5, 3)	—	19	4	6	10	8
7	Konnie	"Ellada, Hora Tou Fotos" (by Katy Garbi)	24 (6, 5, 6, 7)	—	24	5	9	14	7
8	Giannis Chatzop.	"To Trehantiri" (by Kostas Bigalis and The Sea Lovers)	20 (3, 6, 7, 4)	5	25	6	3	9	9
9	Parthena	"S.A.G.A.P.O." (by Michalis Rakintzis)	27 (10, 8, 3, 6)	15	42	10	5	15	6
10	Sabrina	"Autostop" (by Anna Vissi and Epikouri)	17 (5, 3, 4, 5)	—	17	3	4	7	10

=== Week 4 ===
The fourth episode aired on May 14, 2017 and the winner was Parthena with 23 points. Parthena chose to give the money from the audience voting to the organization "Agia Marina" in Kavala.

The guests of the evening were Zeta Makripoulia, who replaced Elli Kokkinou due to Kokkinou's business commitments and the cast of the musical Evita.

#	Contestant	Song	Judges and Contestants				Audience	Total	Place
#	Contestant	Song	Judges^{1}	Extra^{2}	Total^{3}	Result^{4}	Audience	Total	Place
1	Dimitris	"Can't Stop the Feeling!" (by Justin Timberlake)	39 (8, 10, 12, 9)	—	39	8	10	18	4
2	Aris	"Evlampia" (by Giannis Giokarinis)	22 (6, 6, 5, 5)	—	22	4	8	12	7
3	Isaias	"U Can't Touch This" (by MC Hammer)	36 (9, 11, 9, 7)	—	36	7	7	14	6
4	Irene	"Thimos" (by Paola Foka)	37 (10, 7, 8, 12)	10	47	10	9	19	3
5	Parthena	"Human" (by Rag'n'Bone Man)	46 (12, 12, 11, 11)	5	51	12	11	23	1
6	Konnie	"Like a Prayer" (by Madonna)	23 (5, 5, 7, 6)	—	23	5	6	11	8
7	Giannis Chatzig.	"Don't Be So Shy" (by Imany)	40 (11, 9, 10, 10)	—	40	9	12	21	2
8	Giannis Chatzop.	"Didi" (by Khaled)	29 (7, 8, 6, 8)	20	49	11	5	16	5
9	Sabrina	"Passion" (by Rod Stewart)	12 (3, 3, 3, 3)	15	27	6	3	9	9
10	Antonis	"Mera me tin Mera" (by Nikos Kourkoulis)	16 (4, 4, 4, 4)	—	16	3	4	7	10

=== Week 5 ===
The fifth episode aired on May 25, 2017 and the winner was Aris with 24 points. Aris chose to give the money from the audience voting to the organization "Kethea-Orizontes" in Athens.

The guests of the evening were Thanasis Alevras, who replaced Fotis Sergoulopoulos due to Sergoulopoulos' planned trip and Kostas Voutsas who helped Dimitris Makalias during his performance.

#	Contestant	Song	Judges and Contestants				Audience	Total	Place
#	Contestant	Song	Judges^{1}	Extra^{2}	Total^{3}	Result^{4}	Audience	Total	Place
1	Parthena	"I Will Survive" (by Gloria Gaynor)	34 (9, 7, 9, 9)	—	34	9	8	17	5
2	Konnie	"Se Exo Kanei Theo" (by Katerina Stanisi)	25 (7, 8, 4, 6)	5	30	7	7	14	6
3	Giannis Chatzig.	"Cake by the Ocean" (by Joe Jonas of DNCE)	30 (8, 6, 8, 8)	—	30	8	10	18	4
4	Isaias	"You Are So Beautiful" (by Joe Cocker)	46 (11, 11, 12, 12)	5	51	10	9	19	3
5	Giannis Chatzop.	"Poia Thisia" (by Angela Dimitriou)	22 (5, 9, 5, 3)	—	22	4	5	9	8
6	Dimitris	"Enas Ouranos Gematos me Asteria" (by Giannis Vogiatzis)	25 (6, 5, 7, 7)	—	25	6	6	12	7
7	Aris	"These Boots Are Made for Walkin' "(by Nancy Sinatra)	40 (10, 10, 10, 10)	20	60	12	12	24	1
8	Sabrina	"Skyfall" (by Adele)	19 (4, 4, 6, 5)	—	19	3	4	7	10
9	Antonis	"It's Not Unusual" (by Tom Jones)	13 (3, 3, 3, 4)	10	23	5	3	8	9
10	Irene	"Goodbye My Lover" (by James Blunt)	46 (12, 12, 11, 11)	10	56	11	11	22	2

=== Week 6 ===
The sixth episode aired on June 1, 2017 and the winner was Aris with 24 points. Aris chose to give the money from the audience voting to the organization "Kethea-Orizontes" in Athens. After the combined final scores, three contestants had 17 points and two contestants had 9 points. The one who got the highest score from the audience got the highest final place out of the two in both situations.

#	Contestant	Song	Judges and Contestants				Audience	Total	Place
#	Contestant	Song	Judges^{1}	Extra^{2}	Total^{3}	Result^{4}	Audience	Total	Place
1	Irene	"Iparhei Logos" (by Elena Paparizou)	19 (4, 4, 5, 6)	5	24	5	3	8	10
2	Giannis Chatzig.	"Sti Agora tou Al Halili" (by Alkinoos Ioannidis)	26 (7, 7, 7, 5)	—	26	6	10	16	6
3	Konnie	"You Got the Love" (by Florence and the Machine)	36 (10, 8, 8, 10)	—	36	9	8	17	4
4	Dimitris	"Tha Spaso Koupes" (by Marina Satti)	35 (8, 9, 9, 9)	—	35	8	9	17	3
5	Sabrina	"Call me" (by Blondie)	23 (5, 5, 6, 7)	10	33	7	4	11	7
6	Aris	"Nessun dorma" (by Luciano Pavarotti)	46 (12, 12, 11, 11)	15	61	12	12	24	1
7	Parthena	"Sfirixa kai Elixes" (by Panos Kiamos)	12 (3, 3, 3, 3)	—	12	3	6	9	8
8	Isaias	"Arhizo kai Trelainomai" (by Manolis Kontaros)	46 (11, 11, 12, 12)	15	61	11	11	22	2
9	Antonis	"Born in the U.S.A." (by Bruce Springsteen)	37 (9, 10, 10, 8)	5	42	10	7	17	5
10	Giannis Chatzop	"Me to Stoma Gemato Filia" (by Leonidas Velis)	20 (6, 6, 4, 4)	—	20	4	5	9	9

=== Week 7 ===
The seventh episode aired on June 8, 2017 and the winner was Giannis Chatzigeorgiou with 22 points. Chatzigeorgiou chose to give the money from audience to "The Smile of the Child". After the combined final scores, two contestants had 16 points and two contestants had 13 points. The one who got the highest score from the audience got the highest final place out of the two in both situations. Also, Elli Kokkinou song her new song "To Parapono mou"

#	Contestant	Song	Judges and Contestants				Audience	Total	Place
#	Contestant	Song	Judges^{1}	Extra^{2}	Total^{3}	Result^{4}	Audience	Total	Place
1	Parthena	"I Put a Spell on You" (by Bette Midler)	37 (9, 10, 10, 8)	15	52	12	9	21	2
2	Isaias	"Heavy Cross" (by Gossip)	34 (10, 9, 9, 6)	5	39	9	7	16	5
3	Giannis Chatzig.	"Losing My Religion" (by R.E.M.)	37 (8, 11, 11, 7)	5	42	10	12	22	1
4	Dimitris	"Shape of You" (by Ed Sheeran)	24 (6, 4, 5, 9)	5	29	6	10	16	4
5	Sabrina	"To Metrima" (by Natassa Bofiliou)	30 (7, 6, 7, 10)	5	35	7	6	13	7
6	Konnie	"Come & Get It" (by Selena Gomez of Selena Gomez and the Scene)	37 (11, 7, 8, 11)	—	37	8	5	13	8
7	Antonis	"Mpikan ta Gidia sto Mantri" (by Giota Chalkia)	15 (4, 5, 3, 3)	2	25	5	4	9	9
8	Irene	"Read All About It" (by Emeli Sandé)	48 (12, 12, 12, 12)	—	48	11	8	19	3
9	Aris	"Paranoid" (by Ozzy Osbourne of Black Sabbath)	24 (5, 8, 6, 5)	—	24	4	11	15	6
10	Giannis Chatzop.	"Mehri to Telos tou Kosmou" (by Antonis Remos)	14 (3, 3, 4, 4)	5	19	3	3	6	10

=== Week 8 ===
The eighth episode aired on June 15, 2017 and the winner was Antonis with 23 points. Antonis chose to give the money from audience to "Syllogos Philanthropikon" in Andros. After the combined final scores, two contestants had 20 points and two contestants had 14 points. The one who got the highest score from the audience got the highest final place out of the two in both situations.

#	Contestant	Song	Judges and Contestants				Audience	Total	Place
#	Contestant	Song	Judges^{1}	Extra^{2}	Total^{3}	Result^{4}	Audience	Total	Place
1	Konnie	"BonBon" (by Era Istrefi)	36 (11, 8, 9, 8)	5	41	9	7	16	4
2	Aris	"Can You Feel the Love Tonight" (by Elton John)	21 (5, 6, 6, 4)	—	21	5	9	14	6
3	Dimitris	"Basket Case" (by Green Day)	32 (6, 7, 10, 9)	20	52	10	10	20	3
4	Giannis Chatzop.	"Ta Koritsia Ksenihtane" (by Alexia)	47 (12, 12, 12, 11)	5	52	11	4	15	5
5	Irene	"Toxic" (by Britney Spears)	18 (4, 4, 5, 5)	—	18	4	3	7	10
6	Parthena	"Na Emne Prasion Hortari/Paradosiako/Katirkagia" (by Chrysanthos Theodoridis)	37 (10, 11, 4, 12)	—	37	8	12	20	2
7	Giannis Chatzig.	"Never Gonna Give You Up" (by Rick Astley)	22 (7, 5, 7, 3)	—	22	6	8	14	7
8	Sabrina	"Kai Vgale to Kragion sou" (by Stefanos Korkolis)	15 (3, 3, 3, 6)	—	15	3	5	8	9
9	Antonis	"Den me Ponas den m'Agapas" (by Panos Gavalas)	36 (8, 10, 8, 10)	20	56	12	11	23	1
10	Isaias	"Ton Eauto tou Paidi" (by Mario Frangoulis)	36 (9, 9, 11, 7)	—	36	7	6	13	8

=== Week 9 ===
The ninth episode aired on June 22, 2017 and the winner was Antonis with 18 points. Antonis chose to give the money from audience to "Syllogos Philanthropikon" in Andros. After the combined final scores, four contestants had 18 points, two contestants had 16 and two contestants had 7 points. The one who got the highest score from the audience got the highest final place out of the two in both situations.

#	Contestant	Song	Judges and Contestants				Audience	Total	Place
#	Contestant	Song	Judges^{1}	Extra^{2}	Total^{3}	Result^{4}	Audience	Total	Place
1	Antonis	"Happy" (by Pharrell Williams)	32 (8, 8, 10, 6)	—	32	6	12	18	1
2	Aris	"Enter Sandman" (by Metallica)	48 (11, 9, 11, 12)	5	48	11	7	18	3
3	Isaias	"Superstition" (by Stevie Wonder)	47 (12, 12, 12, 11)	5	52	12	6	18	4
4	Sabrina	"Physical" (by Olivia Newton-John)	15 (4, 4, 4, 3)	—	15	3	4	7	9
5	Irene	"Dyo Meres Mono" (by Dimitra Galani)	33 (10, 5, 8, 10)	5	38	9	8	17	5
6	Dimitis	"Singin' in the Rain" (by Gene Kelly)	29 (6, 6, 9, 8)	5	34	7	9	16	7
7	Konnie	"The Blower's Daughter" (by Damien Rice of Juniper)	16 (5, 3, 3, 5)	5	21	4	3	7	10
8	Giannis Chatzop.	"Ston Evdomo Ourano" (by Lefteris Pantazis)	32 (9, 10, 6, 7)	15	47	10	5	15	8
9	Giannis Chatzig.	"Blue Jeans" (by Lana Del Rey)	27 (7, 11, 5, 4)	10	37	8	10	18	2
10	Parthena	"Ego S'agapisa Edo" (by Eleni Tsaligopoulou)	26 (3, 7, 7, 9)	—	26	5	11	16	6

=== Week 10 ===
The tenth episode aired on June 29, 2017 and the winner was Konnie with 24 points. Konnie chose to give the money from audience to "Stray.gr" in Athens. After the combined final scores two contestants had 14 points. The one who got the highest score from the audience got the highest final place out of the two in both situations.

#	Contestant	Song	Judges and Contestants				Audience	Total	Place
#	Contestant	Song	Judges^{1}	Extra^{2}	Total^{3}	Result^{4}	Audience	Total	Place
1	Giannis Chatzig.	"Kalokairina Rantevou" (by Dytikes Sinoikies)	14 (4, 3, 3, 4)	—	14	3	11	14	6
2	Irene	"Diamonds" (by Rihanna)	23 (7, 6, 7, 3)	—	23	5	3	8	10
3	Isaias	"Zigouala" (by Stelios Kazantzidis)	44 (9, 8, 8, 9)	10	34	10	9	19	2
4	Dimitris	"It's Raining Men" (by Ginger Spice of Spice Girls)	41 (10, 10, 10, 11)	10	51	11	7	17	4
5	Antonis	"Addicted to Love" (by Robert Palmer)	30 (6, 7, 9, 8)	—	30	8	10	18	3
6	Sabrina	"The Final Countdown" (by Europe)	22 (5, 5, 6, 6)	5	27	6	8	14	7
7	Konnie	"Nimbooda Nimbooda" (by Aishwarya Rai, playback singer Kavita Krishnamurthy)	48 (12, 12, 12, 12)	25	73	12	12	24	1
8	Aris	"Anepanaliptos" (by Tolis Voskopoulos)	43 (11, 11, 11, 10)	—	43	9	6	15	5
9	Giannis Chatzop.	"Hit the Road Jack" (by Ray Charles)	16 (3, 4, 4, 5)	—	16	4	5	9	9
10	Parthena	"Forget You" (by CeeLo Green)	29 (8, 9, 5, 7)	—	29	7	4	11	8

=== Week 11: Semi-finals ===
The eleventh episode aired on July 6, 2017 and the winner was Antonis with 24 points. Antonis chose to give the money from audience to "Syllogos Philanthropikon" in Andros. After the combined final scores, three contestants had 20 points, two contestants had 13 points and two contestants had 9 points. The one who got the highest score from the audience got the highest final place out of the two in both situations.

The Secret Guest of the evening was Katerina Stikoudi, who transformed into Natassa Bofiliou and sang En Lefko.

In the semi-finals, the four contestants with the highest cumulative scores from all 11 weeks were announced and were the ones to compete in the finals. The four finalists were; Giannis Chatzigeorgiou with 200 points, Isaias Matiaba with 196 points, Aris Makris with 190 points and Parthena Horozidou with 188 points. The remaining six players will perform in duets but they will not get scored. It was also the last time the judges were going to score the contestants since the winner is decided only by the audience.

#	Contestant	Song	Judges and Contestants				Audience	Total	Place
#	Contestant	Song	Judges^{1}	Extra^{2}	Total^{3}	Result^{4}	Audience	Total	Place
1	Aris	"So What" (by Pink)	22 (5, 5, 5, 7)	—	22	5	8	13	5
2	Isaias	"Despacito" (by Luis Fonsi feat. Daddy Yankee)	41 (10, 10, 10, 11)	5	46	11	9	20	2
3	Parthena	"Total Eclipse of the Heart" (by Bonnie Tyler)	32 (11, 7, 6, 8)	10	42	9	11	20	2
4	Giannis Chatzig.	"Fast Car" (by Tracy Chapman)	41 (9, 11, 11, 10)	5	46	10	10	20	2
5	Giannis Chatzop.	"Logia Kleidomena" (by Vasilis Paiteris)	29 (8, 8, 8, 5)	10	39	8	4	12	7
6	Antonis	"Fly Me to the Moon" (by Tony Bennett)	48 (12, 12, 12, 12)	15	63	12	12	24	1
7	Dimitris	"Mana Den Fytepsame" (by George Dalaras)	17 (4, 6, 4, 3)	—	17	4	5	9	9
8	Irene	"Be the One" (by Dua Lipa)	23 (6, 4, 7, 6)	5	28	6	3	9	10
9	Sabrina	"Mia me Theleis" (by Zozo Sapountzaki)	13 (3, 3, 3, 4)	—	13	3	7	10	8
10	Konnie	"My Love" (by Kovacs)	34 (7, 9, 9, 9)	—	34	7	6	13	6

=== Week 12: Finals ===
The twelfth and final live aired on July 13, 2017 and the winner of the show was Giannis Chatzigeorgiou. The income from the audience voting for the final, was divided in ten equal parts and was given to all ten foundations that the contestants were representing during the twelve live shows.

At the beginning of the show, Bekatorou performed the song "Den Kanei Kryo stin Ellada" by Locomondo.

The six contestants who did not compete in the finals, received a special award for their participation on the show.

#	Contestant	Song	Result^{5}
1	Giannis Chatzig.	"Every You Every Me" (by Placebo)	1st place
2	Isaias	"Ti Epaiksa sto Laurio" (by Dionysis Savvopoulos)	2nd place
3	Aris	"Gethsemane" (by Steve Balsamo)	3rd place
4	Parthena	"One Night Only" (by Jennifer Hudson)	4th place
5/6	Antonis-Konnie	"Barbie Girl" (by Aqua)	Did; Not; Score
7/8	Dimitris-Irene	"City of Stars" (by Ryan Gosling & Emma Stone)	Did; Not; Score
9/10	Giannis Chatzop.-Sabrina	"To Gucci ton Masai" (by Giorgos Mazonakis & Elli Kokkinou)	Did; Not; Score

Notes
1. The points that judges gave in order (Moutsinas, Kokkinou, Fasoulis, Sergoulopoulos).
2. Each contestant gave 5 points to a contestant of their choice.
3. Total of both extra and judges' score.
4. Result of both extra and judges' score.
5. In the final, only the audience voted for the winner and the one with the most votes won the competition.

== Results chart ==
Contestant	Wk 1	Wk 2	Wk 3	Wk 4	Wk 5	Wk 6	Wk 7	Wk 8	Wk 9	Wk 10	Wk 11	Wk 12	Total	Average
Giannis Chatzig.	4th 16 points	1st 22 points	3rd 19 points	2nd 21 points	4th 18 points	6th 16 points	1st 22 points	7th 14 points	2nd 18 points	6th 14 points	3rd 20 points	1st	200	18.1
Isaias	1st 22 points	7th 12 points	1st 21 points	6th 14 points	3rd 19 points	2nd 22 points	5th 16 points	8th 13 points	4th 18 points	2nd 19 points	4th 20 points	2nd	196	17.8
Aris	5th 14 points	2nd 22 points	4th 19 points	8th 12 points	1st 24 points	1st 24 points	6th 15 points	6th 14 points	3rd 18 points	5th 15 points	5th 13 points	3rd	190	17.2
Parthena	2nd 20 points	5th 16 points	6th 15 points	1st 23 points	5th 17 points	8th 9 points	2nd 21 points	2nd 20 points	6th 16 points	8th 11 points	2nd 20 points	4th	188	17.1
Dimitris	3rd 18 points	9th 11 points	2nd 20 points	4th 18 points	7th 12 points	3rd 17 points	4th 16 points	3rd 20 points	7th 16 points	4th 18 points	9th 9 points	—	175	15.9
Antonis	7th 12 points	3rd 17 points	5th 16 points	10th 7 points	9th 8 points	5th 17 points	9th 9 points	1st 23 points	1st 18 points	3rd 18 points	1st 24 points	—	169	15.3
Konnie	6th 14 points	4th 16 points	7th 14 points	8th 11 points	6th 14 points	4th 17 points	8th 13 points	4th 16 points	10th 7 points	1st 24 points	6th 13 points	—	159	14.4
Irene	8th 12 points	8th 12 points	8th 10 points	3rd 19 points	2nd 22 points	10th 8 points	3rd 19 points	10th 7 points	5th 17 points	10th 8 points	10th 9 points	—	143	13
Giannis Chatzop.	10th 10 points	6th 15 points	9th 9 points	5th 16 points	8th 9 points	9th 9 points	10th 6 points	5th 15 points	8th 15 points	9th 9 points	7th 12 points	—	125	11.3
Sabrina	9th 12 points	10th 6 points	10th 7 points	9th 9 points	10th 7 points	7th 11 points	7th 13 points	9th 8 points	9th 7 points	7th 14 points	8th 10 points	—	104	9.4

indicates the contestant came first that week.
indicates the contestant came last that week.
performed but didn't score
indicates the winning contestant.
indicates the runner-up contestant.
indicates the third-place contestant.
indicates the fourth-place contestant.

== Ratings ==
#	Episode	Date	Ratings (total)	Ratings (ages 15–44)	Source
1	Week 1	April 23, 2017	20.4%	17.2%	
2	Week 2	April 30, 2017	19%	17%	
3	Week 3	May 7, 2017	17.3%	13.8%	
4	Week 4	May 14, 2017	15.4%	11.7%	
5	Week 5	May 25, 2017	20.2%	17.1%	
6	Week 6	June 1, 2017	15.8%	14.6%	
7	Week 7	June 8, 2017	17.2%	16.2%	
8	Week 8	June 15, 2017	14.7%	14.5%	
9	Week 9	June 22, 2017	17.5%	17.3%	
10	Week 10	June 29, 2017	14%	18%	
11	Week 11	July 6, 2017	14.9%	13.7%	
12	Week 12	July 13, 2017	28.9%	25.7%	
