= Your Face Sounds Familiar (Greek TV series) =

- Presented by: Sakis Rouvas; Former presenters: Maria Bekatorou
- Judges: Katerina Papoutsaki; George Theofanous; Renos Haralambidis; Rena Morfi; Former judges: Bessy Malfa; Alexandros Rigas; Katerina Gagaki; Gerasimos Genatas; Petros Filipidis; Elli Kokkinou; Nikos Moutsinas; Fotis Sergoulopoulos; Stamatis Fassoulis; Mimi Denisi; Giorgos Mazonakis; Dimitris Starovas; Alexis Georgoulis; Mirka Papaconstantinou; Takis Zacharatos; Michalis Reppas; Kostis Maravegias
- Opening theme: Your Face Sounds Familiar theme
- Ending theme: The winning song of each episode
- Country of origin: Greece
- Original language: Greek
- No. of seasons: 8
- No. of episodes: 57

Production
- Producer: ENA Productions
- Running time: approx. 180–200 mins (including commercials)

Original release
- Network: ANT1
- Release: 14 April 2013 – present

Related
- Your Face Sounds Familiar (series)

Your Face Sounds Familiar is the Greek version of the international reality television franchise Your Face Sounds Familiar, developed by Endemol. The show premiered on 14 April 2013 on ANT1.

From series 1 until series 4, the show was Live but from series 5, the show will be filmed.

== Format ==
The show consists of twelve live shows, where ten celebrities (singers and actors) try to incarnate various stars of the Greek and worldwide music industry. The contestants are evaluated by the judges of the show, the audience and the other contestants. The judges have to evaluate the contestants each live from 3 to 12 with 12 being the judge's favorite of the night. Each contestant gives five extra points to one of the other contestants, who was their favorite of the night. The judges' score is combined with the five extra points and that final score is combined with the audience's voting to determine the winner of the night. No one will be eliminating, but the winner will be according to the total score of each live. However the winner of each live show will give the money collected during the night from the audience's voting to a charity of their choice.

== Cast ==
=== Hosts ===
The host for the first seven seasons of the show was Maria Bekatorou Since season 8, the show has been hosted by Sakis Rouvas.

Key:
Previous
Current

Host	Season							
Host	1	2	3	4	5	6	7	8
Maria Bekatorou								
Sakis Rouvas								

=== Judges ===
Alexandros Rigas, Gerasimos Gennatas, Katerina Gagaki and Bessy Malfa were the judges of the first season. Rigas, Gagaki and Malfa returned as judges for the second season while Gennatas is replaced by Takis Zacharatos. The judging panel for the third season was changed completely with Katerina Papoutsaki, Nikos Moutsinas, Petros Filippidis and Stamatis Fasoulis replacing the previous judges. In the fourth season, Filippidis and Papoutsaki were replaced by Fotis Sergoulopoulos and Elli Kokkinou.

Key:
Previous
Current
Guest judge
Contestant

Judge	Season							
Judge	1	2	3	4	5	6	7	8
Alexandros Rigas								
Katerina Gagaki								
Bessy Malfa								
Gerasimos Gennatas								
Takis Zacharatos								
Nikos Moutsinas								
Stamatis Fasoulis								
Katerina Papoutsaki								
Petros Filipidis								
Elli Kokkinou								
Fotis Sergoulopoulos								
Zeta Makripoulia								
Thanasis Alevras								
Giorgos Mazonakis								
Dimitris Starovas								
Alexis Georgoulis								
Mimi Denisi								
Betty Maggira								
Natalia Germanou								
Mirka Papaconstantinou								
Michalis Reppas								
Kostis Maravegias								
George Theofanous								
Renos Haralambidis								
Rena Morfi								

== Series overview ==
Season	Duration dates		No. of stars	No. of weeks	Celebrity honor places			
Season	Premiere	Finale	No. of stars	No. of weeks	Winner	Second place	Third place	Fourth place
1	April 14, 2013	June 30, 2013	10	12	Thanasis Alevras	Krateros Katsoulis	Crystallia	Mando
2	March 9, 2014	June 15, 2014	10	13	Giannis Savvidakis	Costas Doxas	Lefteris Eleftheriou	Pantelis Kanarakis
3	April 3, 2016	June 26, 2016	10	12	Giannis Kritikos	Apostolia Zoi	Dimos Beke	Mathildi Maggira
4	April 23, 2017	July 13, 2017	10	12	Giannis Hatzigeorgiou	Isaias Matiaba	Aris Makris	Parthena Horozidou
5	January 27, 2019	May 5, 2019	10	14	Ian Stratis	Katerina Stikoudi	Melina Makri	Argiris Aggelou
6	February 16, 2020	March 22, 2020	10	6	Season discontinued due to COVID-19 pandemic			
7	February 28, 2021	May 30, 2021	9 (1 ejected)	11	Tania Breazou	Ian Stratis	Isaias Matiaba	Thanasis Alevras
8	April 19, 2026	July 5, 2026	10	12	Marilou Katsafadou	Memos Begnis	Biased Beast	Konstantinos Magklaras

=== Season 1 (2013) ===
The first season premiered on April 14, 2013, on ANT1 and the contestants were five women and five men; Anta Livitsanou, Crystallia, Mando, Sylvia Delikoura, Thomai Apergi, Konstantinos Kazakos, Kostas Martakis, Krateros Katsoulis, Nikos Ganos and Thanasis Alevras.

The trailer of the season featured a man transforming to Madonna and singing "Like a Virgin" while Bekatorou says: "It's coming and it will change our Sundays".

The last show was aired on June 30, 2013, and the winner of the season was the actor Thanasis Alevras.

=== Season 2 (2014) ===
The second season of the show premiered on March 9, 2014, on ANT1 and the contestants are five women and five men; Eleftheria Eleftheriou, Sophia Vossou, Betty Maggira, Sophia Kourtidou, Vanessa Adamopoulou, Giannis Savvidakis, Lefteris Eleutheriou, Costas Doxas, Aris Plaskasovitis and Pantelis Kanarakis.

The trailer of the season started airing on February 20, 2014, and it featured an older woman doing her groceries and running into famous figures such as Elvis Presley, Madonna and Michael Jackson. At the counter was the host of the show, Maria Bekatorou, who the woman recognized and told her "Your face sounds familiar".

The last show was aired on June 15, 2014, and the winner of the season was the singer Giannis Savvidakis.

=== Season 3 (2016) ===
The third season of the show premiered on April 3, 2016, on ANT1 and the contestants were five women and five men; Josephine, Apostolia Zoi, Valeria Kouroupi, Eleni Karakasi, Mathildi Maggira, Stamatis Gardelis, Othonas Metaxas, Valandis, Dimos Beke and Giannis Kritikos.

The trailer of the season started airing on March 18, 2016.

The last episode was aired on June 26, 2016, and the winner of the season was the singer Giannis Kritikos.

=== Season 4 (2017) ===
The fourth season of the show premiered on April 23, 2017, on ANT1 and the contestants this time were four women and six men; Sabrina, Irene Trost, Koni Metaxa, Parthena Horozidou, Isaias Matiaba, Aris Makris, Giannis Chatzigeorgiou, Antonis Dominos, Giannis Chatzopoulos and Dimitris Makalias.

The trailer of the season started airing on March 27, 2017.

The last show was aired on July 14, 2017, and the winner of the season was the singer Giannis Chatzigeorgiou.

=== Season 5 (2019) ===
The fifth season of the show premiered on January 27, 2019, on ANT1 and the contestants were five women and five men; Melina Makri, Katerina Stikoudi, Eva Tsachra, Eleni Filini, Chrispa, Argiris Aggelou, Eythimis Zisakis, Vaggelis Panagopoulos, Ian Stratis and Pashalis Tsarouhas.

The trailer of the season started airing on January 2, 2019.

The last episode was aired on May 5, 2019, and the winner of the season was the singer Ian Stratis.

=== Season 6 (2020) ===
The sixth season of the show premiered on February 16, 2020, on ANT1 and the contestants were five women and five men; Evridiki, Maria Androutsou, Danae Loukaki, Tania Breazou, Katerina Koukouraki, Lambis Livieratos, Yiorgos Hraniotis, Stefanos Mouagkie, Nicolas Raptakis and Ilias Bogdanos.

The season discontinued due to COVID-19 pandemic, with the sixth and final episode being aired on March 22, 2020.

=== Season 7: All Star (2021) ===
The seventh season of the show premiered on February 28, 2021. This season will feature ten contestants from the previous seasons, as the all stars, six men and four women: from season one are Thanasis Alevras and Krateros Katsoulis, from season two are Lefteris Eleutheriou, Costas Doxas and Betty Maggira, from season three is Mathildi Maggira, from season four is Isaias Matiaba, from season five are Katerina Stikoudi and Ian Stratis and from season six is Tania Breazou.

The jury voting slightly changed compared to other seasons. The traditional voting (3, 4, 5, 6, 7, 8, 9, 10, 11, 12) changed and the jury now awards 2 sets of 7 points, 2 sets of 8 points, 2 sets of 9, 2 sets of 10, a set of 11 points and a set of 12 points.

Due to the restrictions, social distances and the ongoing lockdown in Greece, there is no live audience. While there is no audience in the studio, the audience watches the live show through Zoom and votes from there for their favorite contestant.

Also, for this season only, the contestants can choose to perform one of their previous season' performances, by pressing the Awesome Card on buzzer.

After the premiere, Costas Doxas withdrew from the show, reducing the number of participants to 9. After Doxas' withdrawal, the jury awards one set of 10 points, instead of two.

=== Season 8 (2026) ===
The eighth season of the show premiered on 19 April 2026. It is hosted, for the first time, by Sakis Rouvas. The judging panel consists of Giorgos Theofanous, Renos Haralambidis, Katerina Papoutsaki, and Rena Morfi.

The season features ten contestants: Dorothea Merkouri, Mariada Pieridi, Panagiotis Rafailidis, Marilou Katsafadou, Idra Kayne, Biased Beast, Memos Begnis, Konstantinos Magklaras, Afroditi Chatzimina, and Alexandros Bourdoumis.

The last episode was aired on July 5, 2026, and the winner of the season was the actress Marilou Katsafadou.
