= Your Face Sounds Familiar (Greek TV series) series 1 =

Your Face Sounds Familiar
- Season 1
- Winner: Thanasis Alevras
- No. of episodes: 12

Release
- Original network: ANT1
- Original release: April 14 – June 30, 2013

Series chronology
- Next → Series 2

Your Face Sounds Familiar is a Greek reality show airing on ANT1.

== Format ==
The first season ran from April 14, 2013 to June 30, 2013 and consisted of twelve live shows where ten celebrity contestants impersonated various Greek and foreign singers. The contestants are evaluated by the show's judges, the audience and the other contestants. The contestant who gathers the highest score in each live (winner of the night), is able to donate the money that is collected from the audience's voting to a charity of their choice. In Cyprus, the money were given to "Mana" (Mother) organization every week.

During the live shows, no one is eliminated at the end of the night. At the end of the semi-final, the four couples with the highest cumulative scores from all eleven lives are the ones who can compete at the final for the first place. The four finalists are scored only by the audience in the final and the contestant who receives the most votes is the winner of the show. Audience is able to vote during the whole week for the winner.

== Cast ==
=== Host and judges ===
The host of the show was Maria Bekatorou and the four judges were Alexandros Rigas, Gerasimos Gennatas, Katerina Gagaki and Bessy Malfa. Dafni Bokota was a guest judge at the fifth live.

=== Instructors ===
The contestants worked with three instructors during the season to help them achieve the best result possible. Vocal coach Victoria Chalkitis, musical performer Sia Koskina and choreographer Maria Lyraraki.

=== Contestants ===
Ten contestants in total competed in the first season; five women and five men:

Celebrity	Occupation	Average score	Status
Thanasis Alevras	Actor	22.5	Winner
Krateros Katsoulis	Actor	18.5	Runner-up
Crystallia	Singer	18.3	Third place
Mando	Singer	18.4	4th place
Kostas Martakis	Singer	16.2	—N/a
Nikos Ganos	Singer	16.0	—N/a
Thomai Apergi	Singer	15.8	—N/a
Anta Livitsanou	Actor	14.6	—N/a
Sylvia Delikoura	Actor	14.2	—N/a
Konstantinos Kazakos	Actor	12.1	—N/a

== Performances ==
=== Week 1 ===
The premiere aired on April 14, 2013 and winner of the first live was Thanasis Alevras with 23 points. Mando also got 23 points but she ended up in the second place because her 12 points came from the judges but Alevras' from the audience. Alevras chose to give the money from the audience voting to "To Spiti Tou Ithopiou" (The Actor's House).

#	Contestant	Song	Judges and Contestants				Audience	Total	Place
#	Contestant	Song	Judges^{1}	Extra^{2}	Total^{3}	Result^{4}	Audience	Total	Place
1	Crystallia	"On the Floor" (by Jennifer Lopez)	32 (7, 8, 9, 9)	5	37	9	4	13	6
2	Krateros	"Tis Ginekas I Kardia" (by Stratos Dionysiou)	43 (10, 11, 12, 10)	—	43	10	10	20	3
3	Mando	"Woman in Love" (by Barbra Streisand)	37 (11, 9, 6, 11)	20	57	12	11	23	2
4	Kostas	"Poia Nixta S'eklepse" (by Giannis Poulopoulos)	16 (3, 5, 3, 5)	5	21	4	8	12	7
5	Sylvia	"A Far L'amore Comincia Tu" (by Raffaella Carrà)	25 (5, 7, 7, 6)	5	30	6	5	11	9
6	Thanasis	"Na'xan Oloi Oi Anthropoi Mia Agapi Opos Kai Ego" (by Kostas Hatzis)	47 (12, 12, 11, 12)	5	52	11	12	23	1
7	Anta	"Holding Out for a Hero" (by Bonnie Tyler)	19 (6, 4, 5, 4)	5	24	5	5	11	8
8	Thomai	"The Sweetest Taboo" (by Sade)	29 (8, 6, 8, 7)	5	34	8	7	15	5
9	Konstantinos	"Tsikaboum" (by Yiannis Giokarinis)	31 (9, 10, 4, 8)	—	31	7	9	16	4
10	Nikos	"Faith" (by George Michael of Wham!)	20 (4, 3, 10, 3)	—	20	3	3	6	10

=== Week 2 ===
The second live of the show aired on April 21, 2013 and the winner of the night was Thanasis Alevras for the second time. Alevras chose to give the money from the audience voting once again to "To Spiti Tou Ithopiou" (The Actor's House).

#	Contestant	Song	Judges and Contestants				Audience	Total	Place
#	Contestant	Song	Judges^{1}	Extra^{2}	Total^{3}	Result^{4}	Audience	Total	Place
1	Kostas	"Livin' la Vida Loca" (by Ricky Martin)	38 (10, 12, 6, 10)	5	43	10	6	16	5
2	Crystallia	"Ena Chimoniatiko Proi" (by Eleni Vitali)	35 (7, 7, 12, 9)	5	40	9	10	19	4
3	Krateros	"Dancing in the Dark" (by Bruce Springsteen)	23 (6, 4, 8, 5)	—	23	4	9	13	6
4	Sylvia	"I Wanna Be Loved by You" (by Marilyn Monroe)	20 (4, 6, 3, 7)	15	35	7	3	10	9
5	Konstantinos	"Blue Suede Shoes" (by Elvis Presley)	15 (5, 3, 4, 3)	5	20	3	4	7	10
6	Nikos	"SexyBack" (by Justin Timberlake)	44 (12, 11, 10, 11)	5	49	12	8	20	2
7	Thanasis	"An Mia Mera Se Xaso" (by Paschalis)	41 (11, 9, 9, 12)	5	46	11	12	23	1
8	Thomai	"O Antras Pou Tha Pantrefto" (by Martha Karagianni)	19 (3, 5, 7, 4)	5	24	5	7	12	7
9	Anta	"One" (by U2)	34 (9, 8, 11, 6)	5	39	8	11	19	3
10	Mando	"Ain't Nobody" (by Chaka Khan)	31 (8, 10, 5, 8)	—	31	6	5	11	8

=== Week 3 ===
The third live of the show aired on April 28, 2013 and winner of the night was Kostas Martakis. Martakis chose to give the money from the audience voting to "KETHEA" (Therapy Center for Addicted People).

#	Contestant	Song	Judges and Contestants				Audience	Total	Place
#	Contestant	Song	Judges^{1}	Extra^{2}	Total^{3}	Result^{4}	Audience	Total	Place
1	Sylvia	"Eho Stenahori Kardia" (by Rena Vlahopoulou)	22 (9, 4, 4, 5)	—	22	5	4	9	9
2	Mando	"Yarem Yarem" (by Nana Mouskouri)	16 (6, 3, 3, 4)	—	16	3	8	11	8
3	Thomai	"Mercy" (by Duffy)	26 (5, 6, 8, 7)	5	31	6	9	15	6
4	Nikos	"Imagine" (by John Lennon)	27 (4, 7, 6, 10)	5	32	7	7	14	7
5	Konstantinos	"O Imnos Ton Mavron Skilion" (by Loukianos Kelaidonis)	16 (3, 5, 5, 3)	—	16	4	3	7	10
6	Crystallia	"Hurt" (by Christina Aguilera)	48 (12, 12, 12, 12)	15	63	12	5	17	4
7	Krateros	"Ne me quitte pas" (by Jacques Brel)	38 (7, 10, 10, 11)	—	38	8	12	20	2
8	Thanasis	"Ti Sou'kana Kai Pineis" (by Poli Panou)	36 (11, 9, 7, 9)	5	41	9	10	19	3
9	Anta	"Born This Way" (by Lady Gaga)	36 (10, 11, 9, 6)	5	41	10	6	16	5
10	Kostas	"Without You" (by Mariah Carey)	35 (8, 8, 11, 8)	15	50	11	11	22	1

=== Week 4: Laïko night ===
The fourth live of the show aired on May 5, 2013 and it was dedicated to the Greek Laïko song where all the contestants impersonated great Greek singers who represent laïko. Winner of the night was Konstantinos Kazakos. Kazakos chose to give the money from the audience voting to "Tzeni Karezi Foundation".

Thomai Apergi didn't participate to the fourth live due to illness that doctor recommended not to talk for a while. Apergi received the same points as the contestant who was last during the week, Nikos Ganos.

#	Contestant	Song	Judges and Contestants				Audience	Total	Place
#	Contestant	Song	Judges^{1}	Extra^{2}	Total^{3}	Result^{4}	Audience	Total	Place
1	Nikos	"Mia Matia Sou Mono Ftanei" (by Notis Sfakianakis)	19 (6, 5, 4, 4)	—	19	4	4	8	9
2	Crystallia	"Teli, Teli, Teli" (by Haris Alexiou)	30 (7, 8, 10, 5)	—	30	7	12	19	2
3	Thanasis	"To Feggari Panothe Mou" (by Tolis Voskopoulos)	38 (12, 11, 9, 6)	—	38	8	10	18	4
4	Kostas	"Aporo An Esthanesai Tipseis" (by Vasilis Karras)	38 (9, 7, 11, 11)	—	38	9	11	20	3
5	Krateros	"Ego Den Pao Megaro" (by Rita Sakellariou)	42 (10, 12, 8, 12)	5	47	11	7	18	6
6	Anta	"Fotia Sta Savvatovrada" (by Angela Dimitriou)	21 (4, 4, 6, 7)	5	26	5	6	11	7
7	Sylvia	"Tarahi" (by Lefteris Pantazis)	24 (5, 6, 5, 8)	5	29	6	5	11	8
8	Konstantinos	"Ta Dialexta Paidia" (by Vassilis Tsitsanis)	41 (11, 9, 12, 9)	25	66	12	8	20	1
9	Mando	"Den Ksero Poso S'agapo" (by Vicky Moscholiou)	35 (8, 10, 7, 10)	5	40	10	9	19	5

=== Week 5: Eurovision night ===
The fifth live of the show aired on May 12, 2013 and it was dedicated to Eurovision where all the contestants impersonated past participants of the song contest. Winner of the night was Nikos Ganos. Ganos chose to give the money from the audience voting to "Floga" foundation.

Dafni Bokota was a guest judge for the night and Thomai Apergi didn't participate for second week in a row due to illness. Apergi received the same points as the contestant who was last during the week, Konstantinos Kazakos.

#	Contestant	Song	Judges and Contestants				Audience	Total	Place
#	Contestant	Song	Judges^{1}	Extra^{2}	Total^{3}	Result^{4}	Audience	Total	Place
1	Anta	"Dancing Lasha Tumbai" (by Verka Serduchka)	29 (7, 6, 9, 7)	—	29	7	8	15	5
2	Kostas	"Fairytale" (by Alexander Rybak)	19 (5, 5, 4, 5)	—	19	4	9	13	7
3	Mando	"Tornerò" (by Mihai Trăistariu)	31 (9, 7, 7, 9)	—	31	8	7	15	6
4	Thanasis	"A-Ba-Ni-Bi" (by Izhar Cohen & the Alphabeta)	45 (12, 12, 10, 11)	5	50	10	12	22	2
5	Crystallia	"Die for You" (by Antique)	17 (4, 4, 5, 4)	5	22	5	6	11	8
6	Krateros	"S.A.G.A.P.O." (by Michalis Rakintzis)	45 (11, 11, 11, 12)	10	55	11	5	16	4
7	Sylvia	"Aspro mavro" (by Alexia)	30 (8, 8, 6, 8)	5	35	9	10	19	3
8	Nikos	"Everyway That I Can" (by Sertab Erener)	42 (10, 10, 12, 10)	20	62	12	11	23	1
9	Konstantinos	"OPA!" (by Giorgos Alkaios & Friends)	29 (6, 9, 8, 6)	—	29	6	4	10	9

=== Week 6 ===
The sixth live of the show aired on May 19, 2013 and winner of the night was Krateros Katsoulis. Katsoulis chose to give the money from the audience voting to "Paidiko Chorio SOS" (Children's Village SOS).

Thomai Apergi returned to the show after two weeks of absence due to illness.

#	Contestant	Song	Judges and Contestants				Audience	Total	Place
#	Contestant	Song	Judges^{1}	Extra^{2}	Total^{3}	Result^{4}	Audience	Total	Place
1	Kostas	"Esorouxa" (by Nikos Karvelas)	22 (6, 4, 7, 5)	5	27	6	7	13	7
2	Sylvia	"Can't Get You Out of My Head" (by Kylie Minogue)	42 (10, 11, 10, 11)	25	67	12	6	18	4
3	Thomai	"Polles Fores" (by Mary Linda)	15 (3, 5, 3, 4)	—	15	4	4	8	9
4	Thanasis	"Poison" (by Alice Cooper)	37 (9, 10, 8, 10)	—	37	9	11	20	2
5	Nikos	"Baby" (by Justin Bieber)	33 (11, 8, 6, 8)	—	33	8	10	18	5
6	Mando	"Left Outside Alone" (by Anastacia)	33 (8, 9, 9, 7)	—	33	7	8	15	6
7	Krateros	"As Kratisoun Oi Xoroi" (by Dionysis Savvopoulos)	48 (12, 12, 12, 12)	25	63	11	12	23	1
8	Crystallia	"Eklapsa Xtes" (by Mary Chronopoulou)	34 (7, 7, 11, 9)	5	39	10	9	19	3
9	Konstantinos	"People Are Strange" (by Jim Morrison of The Doors)	15 (5, 3, 4, 3)	—	15	3	3	6	10
10	Anta	"Ela" (by Eleonora Zouganeli)	21 (4, 6, 5, 6)	—	21	5	5	10	8

=== Week 7 ===
The seventh live of the show aired on May 26, 2013 and winner of the night was Anta Livitsanou with 22 points. Thomai Apergp also got 22 points but he ended up in the second place because she got 10 points from the audience while Livitsanou got 11. Livitsanou chose to give the money from the audience voting to "Koinoniko Mitropolitiko Iatreio tou Ellinikou" (Social Metropolitan Clinic of Hellenic).

Konstantinos Kazakos didn't participate to the seventh live due to illness. Kazakos received the same points as the contestant who was last during the week, Sylvia Delikoura.

#	Contestant	Song	Judges and Contestants				Audience	Total	Place
#	Contestant	Song	Judges^{1}	Extra^{2}	Total^{3}	Result^{4}	Audience	Total	Place
1	Crystallia	"Paradise City" (by Guns N' Roses)	27 (5, 5, 10, 7)	—	27	5	7	12	6
2	Nikos	"To Gucci Forema" (by Giorgos Mazonakis)	33 (11, 9, 5, 8)	—	33	8	8	16	5
3	Krateros	"Sex Bomb" (by Tom Jones)	30 (8, 10, 8, 4)	—	30	7	5	12	8
4	Anta	"Nothing Compares 2 U" (by Sinéad O'Connor)	44 (9, 11, 12, 12)	15	59	11	11	22	1
5	Thanasis	"Agapi (Poso Poli S'agapisa)" (by Christos Thiveos)	30 (7, 6, 7, 10)	5	35	9	12	21	3
6	Kostas	"Let Me Entertain You" (by Robbie Williams)	28 (6, 7, 9, 6)	—	28	6	6	12	7
7	Mando	"Hilies Vradies" (by Tzeni Vanou)	35 (10, 8, 6, 11)	—	35	10	9	19	4
8	Sylvia	"Mou Aresoune T'agoria" (by Aliki Vougiouklaki)	17 (4, 4, 4, 5)	—	17	4	4	8	9
9	Thomai	"Could You Be Loved" (by Bob Marley of Bob Marley & the Wailers)	44 (12, 12, 11, 9)	25	69	12	10	22	2

=== Week 8 ===
The eighth live aired on June 2, 2013 and the winner was Mando with 22 points. Thanasis Alevras also got 22 points but he ended up in the second place because he got 11 points from the audience while Mando got 12. Mando chose to give the money from the audience voting to "Instituto Systimatikis Analisis tis Simperiforas" (Institute of Systemic Analysis of Behavior).

Anta Livitsanou didn't participate to the eighth live due to surgical removal of malignant thyroid nodule. Livitsanou received the same points as the contestant who was last during the week, Crystallia.

#	Contestant	Song	Judges and Contestants				Audience	Total	Place
#	Contestant	Song	Judges^{1}	Extra^{2}	Total^{3}	Result^{4}	Audience	Total	Place
1	Mando	"Part-Time Lover" (by Stevie Wonder)	41 (10, 10, 10, 11)	5	46	10	12	22	1
2	Crystallia	"Vogue" (by Madonna)	21 (5, 4, 5, 7)	—	46	4	5	9	9
3	Kostas	"Ena Gramma" (by Yiannis Parios)	29 (4, 8, 8, 9)	5	34	8	6	14	7
4	Konstantinos	"I Love Rock 'n' Roll" (by Joan Jett)	28 (9, 6, 7, 6)	—	28	6	4	10	8
5	Krateros	"Ta Mavra Matia Sou" (by Manolis Angelopoulos)	28 (6, 9, 9, 4)	5	33	7	7	14	6
6	Thanasis	"Ta Sfalmata Sou Pelaga" (by Stella Konitopoulou)	45 (12, 12, 11, 10)	5	50	11	11	22	2
7	Nikos	"Kiss" (by Prince of Prince and the Revolution)	46 (11, 11, 12, 12)	10	56	12	8	20	3
8	Thomai	"Mambo Italiano" (by Sophia Loren)	24 (8, 7, 4, 5)	10	34	9	10	19	4
9	Sylvia	"Love to Love You Baby" (by Donna Summer)	26 (7, 5, 6, 8)	—	26	5	9	14	5

=== Week 9 ===
The ninth live aired on June 9, 2013 and the winner was Krateros Katsoulis with 23 points. Crystallia also got 23 points but she ended up in the second place because she got 11 points from the audience while Katsoulis got 12. Katsoulis chose to give the money from the audience voting to "Paidiko Chorio SOS" (Children's Village SOS).

Anta Livitsanou didn't participate for second week in a row due to the surgical removal of malignant thyroid nodule she had the previous week. Livitsanou received the same points as the contestant who was last during the week, Konstantinos Kazakos.

#	Contestant	Song	Judges and Contestants				Audience	Total	Place
#	Contestant	Song	Judges^{1}	Extra^{2}	Total^{3}	Result^{4}	Audience	Total	Place
1	Kostantinos	"Brigiol (Allaksane Ta Gousta Sou)" (by Sakis Boulas)	21 (5, 6, 4, 6)	–	21	4	4	8	9
2	Thomai	"Rehab" (by Amy Winehouse)	33 (9, 11, 8, 5)	5	38	9	7	16	4
3	Manto	"Where Have You Been" (by Rihanna)	22 (6, 7, 5, 4)	–	22	5	5	10	8
4	Kostas	"Krima To Mpoi Sou" (by Marinella)	37 (8, 9, 10, 10)	5	42	10	10	20	3
5	Krateros	"Gangnam Style" (by Psy)	47 (12, 12, 12, 11)	–	47	11	12	23	1
6	Sylvia	"Sweet Dreams (Are Made of This)" (by Annie Lennox of Eurythmics)	30 (10, 5, 7, 8)	5	35	8	6	14	7
7	Thanasis	"Un'altra te" (by Eros Ramazzotti)	24 (7, 4, 6, 7)	–	24	6	9	15	5
8	Nikos	"Stou Paradisou Tin Porta" (by Giorgos Margaritis)	32 (4, 10, 9, 9)	–	32	7	8	15	6
9	Crystallia	"An" (by Dimitra Galani)	42 (11, 8, 11, 12)	30	72	12	11	23	2

=== Week 10 ===
The tenth live of the show aired on June 19, 2013 and not on June 16, 2013 as it was scheduled due to the media strike of that day. Winner of the night was Thomai Apergi. Apergi chose to give the money from the audience voting to "Trauma" foundation.

#	Contestant	Song	Judges and Contestants				Audience	Total	Place
#	Contestant	Song	Judges^{1}	Extra^{2}	Total^{3}	Result^{4}	Audience	Total	Place
1	Sylvia	"Touch me" (by Samantha Fox)	17 (6, 5, 3, 3)	—	17	4	3	7	10
2	Krateros	"Otan Se Eixa Protodei" (by Adamantas of Professional Sinnerz)	29 (8, 8, 5, 8)	—	29	7	5	12	8
3	Crystallia	"Siggnomi Kirie, Poios Eiste?" (by Katerina Stanisi)	39 (9, 11, 8, 11)	5	44	10	11	21	2
4	Kostas	"Are You Gonna Go My Way" (by Lenny Kravitz)	15 (3, 4, 4, 4)	—	15	3	4	7	9
5	Mando	"La donna è mobile" (by Luciano Pavarotti)	42 (12, 9, 12, 9)	5	47	11	8	19	3
6	Thanasis	"Word up" (by Larry Blackmon of Cameo)	37 (10, 10, 7, 10)	—	37	8	10	18	4
7	Anta	"Glory Day" (by Portishead)	27 (4, 7, 9, 7)	10	37	9	6	15	6
8	Nikos	"Eimai Koritsi Zoriko" (by Zozo Sapountzaki)	21 (7, 3, 6, 5)	5	26	5	7	12	7
9	Kostantinos	"Delfini Delfinaki" (by Giannis Kalatzis)	27 (5, 6, 10, 6)	—	27	6	9	15	5
10	Thomai	"Feeling Good" (by Nina Simone)	46 (11, 12, 11, 12)	25	71	12	12	24	1

=== Week 11: Semi-final ===
The eleventh live of the show aired on June 23, 2013 and the winner of the night was Thanasis Alevras for the third time on the show. Alevras chose to give the money from the audience voting once again to "To Spiti Tou Ithopiou" (The Actor's House).

Nikos Ganos didn't participate to the eleventh live due acute pharyngitis. Ganos received the same points as the contestant who was last during the week, Thomai Apergi.

At the end of the semi-final, the four finalists who were going to compete for the first place in the final were announced. The four contestants with the highest cumulative scores were Thanasis Alevras, Krateros Katsoulis, Mando and Crystallia and for the first time, they chose themselves which celebrity they wanted to impersonate.

#	Contestant	Song	Judges and Contestants				Audience	Total	Place
#	Contestant	Song	Judges^{1}	Extra^{2}	Total^{3}	Result^{4}	Audience	Total	Place
1	Anta	"Young and Beautiful" (by Lana Del Rey)	26 (8, 7, 5, 6)	—	26	5	5	10	8
2	Kostantinos	"Matia Vourkomena" (by Grigoris Bithikotsis)	33 (10, 9, 7, 7)	—	33	8	6	14	7
3	Crystallia	"Con te partirò" (by Andrea Bocelli)	30 (5, 5, 9, 11)	10	40	9	11	20	3
4	Thomai	"The Lady Is a Tramp" (by Frank Sinatra)	18 (4, 6, 4, 4)	—	18	4	4	8	9
5	Krateros	"M'aeroplana Kai Vaporia" (by Sotiria Bellou)	31 (7, 8, 8, 8)	—	31	7	7	14	6
6	Thanasis	"Den Mporo Manoula M' (O Giatros)" (by Antonis Kyritsis)	43 (11, 11, 11, 10)	5	48	11	12	23	1
7	Kostas	"Ola S'agapane" (by Stamatis Gonidis)	21 (6, 4, 6, 5)	10	31	6	8	14	5
8	Sylvia	"Why Don't You Do Right?" (by Jessica Rabbit)	48 (12, 12, 12, 12)	15	63	12	9	21	2
9	Mando	"Je suis malade" (by Lara Fabian)	38 (9, 10, 10, 9)	5	43	10	10	20	4

=== Week 12: Final ===
The twelfth and final live aired on June 30, 2013 and the winner of the show was Thanasis Alevras. The income from the audience voting for the final, was divided in ten equal parts and was given to all ten foundations that the contestants were representing during the twelve live shows.

#	Contestant	Song	Result^{5}
1	Thanasis	"Oi Chantres" (by Dimitris Horn)	Winner
2	Krateros	"Geia Sou Chara Sou Venetia" (by Nikos Xilouris)	Runner-up
3	Crystallia	"Ta Laika" (by Alkistis Protopsalti)	3rd place
4	Mando	"I Wanna Dance with Somebody" (by Whitney Houston)	4th place
5/6	Anta-Kostantinos	"Everybody Needs Somebody to Love" (by John Belushi and Dan Aykroyd in The Blues Brothers)	Did; Not; Scored
7/8	Nikos-Kostas	"El Porompompero" & "To Kokkoraki" (by Adelfoi Katsamba)	Did; Not; Scored
9/10	Sylvia-Thomai	"Nowadays" (by Renée Zellweger & Catherine Zeta-Jones in Chicago)	Did; Not; Scored

Notes
1. The points that judges gave in order (Rigas, Malfa, Gennatas, Gagaki).
2. Each contestant gave 5 points to a contestant of their choice.
3. Total of both extra and judges' score.
4. Result of both extra and judges' score.
5. In the final, only the audience voted for the winner and the one with the most votes won the competition.

== Results chart ==
Contestant	Wk 1	Wk 2	Wk 3	Wk 4	Wk 5	Wk 6	Wk 7	Wk 8	Wk 9	Wk 10	Wk 11	Wk 12	Total	Average
Crystallia	9th 8 points	10th 7 points	9th 8 points	1st 24 points	5th 16 points	9th 8 points	5th 16 points	4th 18 points	3rd 20 points	5th 16 points	6th 14 points		155	14.90
Eleftheria	1st 24 points	7th 12 points	2nd 22 points	2nd 22 points	1st 24 points	3rd 20 points	4th 18 points	5th 16 points	1st 23 points	6th 14 points	8th 10 points		205	18.63
Apostolia	7th 11 points	9th 7 points	1st 24 points	9th 7 points	2nd 22 points	4th 18 points	6th 14 points	6th 14 points	4th 18 points	7th 12 points	9th 8 points		155	14.90
Giannis Chatzig	8th 11 points	8th 10 points	10th 6 points	8th 10 points	3rd 20 points	2nd 22 points	7th 12 points	7th 12 points	2nd 23 points	8th 10 points	10th 6 points		142	12.90
Chrispa	10th 6 points	5th 15 points	3rd 20 points	10th 7 points	4th 18 points	10th 6 points	3rd 20 points	8th 10 points	5th 16 points	9th 8 points	1st 24 points		150	13.63
Tania	5th 16 points	6th 15 points	4th 18 points	7th 12 points	6th 14 points	8th 10 points	9th 8 points	10th 6 points	6th 14 points	10th 6 points	2nd 22 points		141	12.81
Krateros	4th 18 points	1st 24 points	5th 16 points	6th 14 points	7th 12 points	1st 24 points	8th 10 points	2nd 22 points	8th 10 points	1st 24 points	4th 19 points		193	17.54
Costas	6th 14 points	3rd 20 points	6th 14 points	5th 16 points	8th 10 points	7th 12 points	10th 6 points	9th 8 points	9th 8 points	2nd 22 points	3rd 19 points		149	13.54
Giannis K.	2nd 21 points	2nd 22 points	7th 12 points	4th 18 points	10th 6 points	5th 16 points	1st 24 points	3rd 20 points	7th 12 points	4th 18 points	5th 16 points		185	16.81
Konnie	3rd 21 points	4th 18 points	8th 10 points	3rd 20 points	9th 8 points	6th 14 points	2nd 22 points	1st 24 points	10th 6 points	3rd 20 points	7th 12 points		175	15.90

indicates the contestant came first that week.
indicates the contestant came last that week.
indicates the contestant that didn't compete and took the same points as the last placed contestant of that week.
performed but didn't score
indicates the winning contestant.
indicates the runner-up contestant.
indicates the third-place contestant.
indicates the fourth-place contestant.

== Ratings ==
Show	Episode	Air date	Rating/share (adults 15–44)	Rating/share (household)	Source
1	Week 1	April 14, 2013	38.5%	34.2%	
2	Week 2	April 21, 2013	35.2%	33.6%	
3	Week 3	April 28, 2013	37.1%	34%	
4	Week 4: Laïko night	May 5, 2013	36.7%	38.1%	
5	Week 5: Eurovision night	May 12, 2013	—N/a	25.3%	
6	Week 6	May 19, 2013	38.1%	36.6%	
7	Week 7	May 26, 2013	38.6%	37.2%	
8	Week 8	June 2, 2013	36.7%	35.7%	
9	Week 9	June 9, 2013	36.4%	36.1%	
10	Week 10	June 19, 2013	36.5%	34%	
11	Week 11: Semi-final	June 23, 2013	42%	40.7%	
12	Week 12: Final	June 30, 2013	51.8%	46.7%	
