= Thomai Apergi =

Greek singer

Thomai Apergi Θωμαή Απέργη
- Also known as: Thomai, Thomais
- Born: Thomai Apergi; 23 December 1988 (age 37)
- Origin: Tinos, Greece
- Genres: Jazz, soul, dance
- Occupation: Singer
- Instruments: Vocals, electric guitar
- Years active: 2012–present
- Label: Panik Records

Thomaí Apérgi (Greek: Θωμαή Απέργη; born 23 December 1988) is a Greek singer. She made her professional debut under the label of Panik Records in 2012 with her first single "What's Your Name" (Mia Vradia). She is known for participating in Eurosong 2013 – a MAD show, the Greek national final for the Eurovision Song Contest.

== Early life ==
Apergi was born on 23 December 1988, in Tinos. Her first audience was her parents to whom she would give concerts every night when she was still a child. She studied music from a young age together with classical and electric guitar lessons, as well as vocals, hence forming her own unique artistic personality. She attended the University of Patras. She studied Greek Literature and linguistics.

== Career ==
=== 2012–present: Professional debut and Eurosong 2013 ===
Her musical work has included exploration of genres such as smooth jazz, bossa nova, downtempo electronica, funk, soul, and jazz. In recent years, her performances have featured songs accompanied by instruments such as the saxophone and piano. She has also performed manouche and gypsy swing with her band Night & Day.

Apergi's first single was released in two versions: the English version "What's Your Name" and the Greek version titled "Mia Vradia" (One Night), bot on Panik Records. The tracks included themes of seduction and dance and a Spanish guitar accompaniment.

Her second, recently released, single is solely influenced by soul – funk influences: "You Keep Me Rolling". A song with a funky character and instrumentation.

Apergi participated in Eurosong 2013 – a MAD show, the national final which selected the Greek entry for the Eurovision Song Contest 2013. Her song, "One Last Kiss", was one of the favourites to win. However she did not manage to win and came third out of four participants.

In April 2013, Apergi became a contestant in the first season of the reality show, Your Face Sounds Familiar.

She made another attempt at Eurovision in 2015. One of the favourites yet again, and presenting the only entry in Greek out of the five, she finished second behind Maria-Elena Kiriakou.

==== Entries in Eurosong ====
Year	Song	Place	Total votes
2013	"One Last Kiss"	3rd	23.54
2015	"Jazz & Sirtaki"	2nd	21.70

== Discography ==
=== Albums ===
- TBD (2013)

=== Singles ===
Title	Year	Peak chart positions	Album
Title	Year	GRE	Album
"What's Your Name" (Mia Vradia)	2012		Non Album Singles
"You Keep Me Rolling"	2012		Non Album Singles
"One Last Kiss"	2013		Non Album Singles
"Summer Nights"	2013		Non Album Singles
"Keep Your Head Up High"	2014		
"Jazz & Sirtaki (Thomai Apergi & Legend)"	2015		
"I Pio Oraia Mou Agapi"	2015		
"O,Ti Agapisa Esy	2017		
"I Gynaika Pou Agapa"	2017		
"Daddy"	2018		
