= Your Face Sounds Familiar (Greek TV series) series 2 =

Your Face Sounds Familiar
- Season 2
- Winner: Giannis Savvidakis
- No. of episodes: 13

Release
- Original network: ANT1
- Original release: March 9 – June 15, 2014

Series chronology
- ← Previous; Series 1 Next → Series 3

Your Face Sounds Familiar is a Greek reality show airing on ANT1. The second season premiered on March 9, 2014 and at the end of every live, the winner of the night will donate the money from the audience's voting (via phone) to a charity of their choice. In Cyprus, the money were given to "Mana" (Mother) organization every week.

== Cast ==
=== Host and Judges ===
The host of the show was once again Maria Bekatorou. Bessy Malfa, Katerina Gagaki and Alexandros Rigas returned as judges for the season while Gerasimos Gennatas was replaced by Takis Zaharatos.

=== Contestants ===
Ten contestants in total competed in the second season; five women and five men. Apostolia Zoi had accepted to participate on the second series of the show, but she cancelled her participation for personal reasons. Zoi revealed this in an interview with "Ego Weekly" Magazine, during her participation on the third series of the show.

Celebrity	Occupation	Average score	Status
Giannis Savvidakis	Singer	19.92	Winner
Costas Doxas	Singer	17.33	Runner-up
Lefteris Eleftheriou	Actor	16.12	Third place
Pantelis Kanarakis	Actor	18	Fourth place
Eleftheria Eleftheriou	Singer	16.08	—N/a
Sophia Vossou	Singer	13.92	—N/a
Aris Plaskasovitis	Actor, singer	12.92	—N/a
Betty Maggira	TV presenter	12.75	—N/a
Sophia Kourtidou	Singer	12.25	—N/a
Vanessa Adamopoulou	Singer	10.75	—N/a

== Performances ==
=== Week 1 ===
The premiere aired on March 9, 2014 and winner of the first live was Lefteris Eleftheriou with 24 points. Eleftheriou chose to give the money from the audience voting to the needy children of the municipality of Naxos and small Cyclades.

#	Contestant	Song	Judges and Contestants				Audience	Total	Place
#	Contestant	Song	Judges^{1}	Extra^{2}	Total^{3}	Result^{4}	Audience	Total	Place
1	Eleftheria	"I'm a Slave 4 U" (by Britney Spears)	16 (3, 5, 4, 4)	5	21	4	8	12	7
2	Costas	"Den Iparho (Revolution)" (by Vasilis Papakonstantinou)	22 (6, 4, 7, 5)	5	27	5	4	9	9
3	Giannis	"Sorry Seems to Be the Hardest Word" (by Elton John)	27 (7, 6, 8, 6)	5	32	6	10	16	4
4	Betty	"Upside Down" (by Diana Ross)	29 (8, 7, 5, 9)	5	34	7	7	14	6
5	Aris	"Mia Sou Lexi (Ballerino)" (by Dakis)	14 (5, 3, 3, 3)	5	19	3	5	8	10
6	Sophia V.	"Mia Gineka Mono Xeri" (by Katy Grey)	31 (10, 8, 6, 7)	5	36	8	3	11	8
7	Sophia K.	"S' Eho Vri Ke Se Hano" (by Natasa Bofiliou)	43 (9, 10, 12, 12)	5	48	11	9	20	3
8	Lefteris	"I Kardia Mou" (by Sakis Rouvas)	44 (12, 12, 9, 11)	5	49	12	12	24	1
9	Vanessa	"Don't Speak" (by No Doubt)	35 (4, 11, 10, 10)	5	40	9	6	15	5
10	Pantelis	"To Pouli" (by Christakis)	39 (11, 9, 11, 8)	5	44	10	11	21	2

=== Week 2 ===
The second episode aired on March 16, 2014 and the winner was Giannis Savvidakis with 23 points. Savvidakis chose to give the money from the audience voting to the orphanage "Melissa" of Thessaloniki.

#	Contestant	Song	Judges and Contestants				Audience	Total	Place
#	Contestant	Song	Judges^{1}	Extra^{2}	Total^{3}	Result^{4}	Audience	Total	Place
1	Costas	"Vlepo Kati Oneira" (by Triantafillos)	36 (8, 9, 10, 9)	5	41	10	6	16	4
2	Vanessa	"Rikse Sto Kormi Mou Spirto" (by Katerina Kouka)	23 (6, 6, 7, 4)	5	28	6	3	9	9
3	Betty	"Stayin' Alive" (by Bee Gees)	22 (3, 7, 6, 6)	5	27	5	8	13	7
4	Eleftheria	"To Parapono" (by Eleftheria Arvanitaki)	18 (5, 3, 5, 5)	5	23	4	9	13	6
5	Aris	"Locked Out of Heaven" (by Bruno Mars)	31 (9, 5, 9, 8)	5	36	8	7	15	5
6	Sophia K.	"Where Is My Man" (by Eartha Kitt)	15 (4, 4, 4, 3)	5	20	3	4	7	10
7	Giannis	"O Trelos" (by Stamatis Kokotas)	45 (12, 10, 11, 12)	5	50	11	12	23	1
8	Lefteris	"Bamboléo" / "Baila Me" (by Gipsy Kings)	35 (10, 12, 3, 10)	5	40	9	10	19	3
9	Sophia V.	"(Where Do I Begin?) Love Story" (by Shirley Bassey)	30 (7, 8, 8, 7)	5	35	7	5	12	8
10	Pantelis	"Ta Logia Kai Ta Xronia Ta Xamena" (by Charalambos Garganourakis)	45 (11, 11, 12, 11)	5	50	12	11	23	2

=== Week 3 ===
The third episode aired on March 23, 2014 and the winner was Pantelis Karanakis with 22 points! And also got 22 points is Giannis Savvidakis!: Karanakis chose to give the money from the audience voting to the needy children of the municipality of Naxos and small Cyclades.

#	Contestant	Song	Judges and Contestants				Audience	Total	Place
#	Contestant	Song	Judges^{1}	Extra^{2}	Total^{3}	Result^{4}	Audience	Total	Place
1	Eleftheria	"Objection" (by Shakira)	16 (4, 5, 4, 3)	5	21	3	7	10	9
2	Sophia V.	"Ela Ston Pappou" (by Tasos Mpougas)	23 (6, 8, 5, 4)	5	28	6	5	11	7
3	Giannis	"Karma Chameleon" (by Culture Club [Boy George])	43 (9, 12, 11, 11)	5	48	11	11	22	2
4	Sophia K.	"De Mas Eniose Kardia Mou" (by Pitsa Papadopoulou)	26 (7, 4, 10, 5)	5	31	8	6	14	5
5	Vanessa	"Secret" (by Madonna)	26 (5, 7, 6, 8)	5	31	7	4	11	8
6	Betty	"Naughty Girl" (by Beyoncé)	23 (8, 6, 3, 6)	5	28	5	3	8	10
7	Costas	"Xoris Esena" (by Efstathia)	38 (10, 9, 9, 10)	5	43	10	8	18	4
8	Aris	"Single Ladies (Put a Ring on It)" (by Beyoncé)	20 (3, 3, 7, 7)	5	25	4	9	13	6
9	Pantelis	"Total Eclipse" (by Klaus Nomi)	47 (12, 11, 12, 12)	5	52	12	10	22	1
10	Lefteris	"Oi Efta Nanoi Sto S/S Cyrenia" (by Thanos Mikroutsikos)	38 (11, 10, 8, 9)	5	40	9	12	21	3

=== Week 4 ===
The fourth episode aired on March 30, 2014 and the winner was Giannis Savvidakis with 22 points. Savvidakis chose to give the money from the audience voting to the foundation "Grammi Gia To Paidi".

#	Contestant	Song	Judges and Contestants				Audience	Total	Place
#	Contestant	Song	Judges^{1}	Extra^{2}	Total^{3}	Result^{4}	Audience	Total	Place
1	Sophia K.	"Love Me Again" (by John Newman)	19 (4, 4, 5, 6)	5	24	5	4	9	10
2	Betty	"Na Sou Kano Mia Erotisi" (by Katerina Stanisi)	28 (5, 8, 8, 7)	5	33	7	6	13	8
3	Costas	"Pidao Ta Kimata" (by Stavento)	40 (12, 9, 7, 12)	5	45	10	5	15	5
4	Sophia V.	"Piece of My Heart" (by Janis Joplin)	45 (11, 11, 12, 11)	5	50	12	7	19	2
5	Eleftheria	"Fotia Me Fotia" (by Panos Kiamos)	21 (8, 3, 6, 4)	5	26	6	11	17	4
6	Vanessa	"Do It like a Dude" (by Jessie J)	42 (9, 12, 11, 10)	5	47	11	3	14	6
7	Pantelis	"O Metikos (Meteque)" (by Melina Mercouri)	19 (6, 6, 4, 3)	5	24	4	9	13	7
8	Lefteris	"Mes Tou Aigeou Ta Nisia" (by Areti Ketime)	16 (3, 5, 3, 5)	5	21	3	8	11	9
9	Aris	"Beat It (by Michael Jackson)	31 (7, 7, 9, 8)	5	36	8	10	18	3
10	Giannis	"Strofes" (by Vasilis Terlegkas)	39 (10, 10, 10, 9)	5	44	9	12	21	1

=== Week 5 ===
The fifth episode aired on April 6, 2014 and the winner was Betty Maggira with 22 points. Maggira chose to give the money from the audience voting to "Elpida" foundation, a foundation for kids who suffer from cancer.

#	Contestant	Song	Judges and Contestants				Audience	Total	Place
#	Contestant	Song	Judges^{1}	Extra^{2}	Total^{3}	Result^{4}	Audience	Total	Place
1	Vanessa	"Smells Like Teen Spirit" (by Nirvana)	17 (5, 4, 3, 5)	5	22	4	3	7	10
2	Eleftheria	"Na M'agapas" (by Eleni Tsaligopoulou)	39 (10, 9, 10, 10)	5	44	10	11	21	2
3	Pantelis	"Ma Baker" (by Boney M.)	30 (8, 10, 6, 6)	5	35	8	7	15	5
4	Aris	"Mono Mia Fora" (by Kostas Makedonas)	31 (9, 5, 9, 8)	5	36	9	5	14	7
5	Giannis	"Simply The Best" (by Tina Turner)	30 (7, 8, 8, 7)	5	35	7	12	19	4
6	Costas	"Sexy and I Know It" (by LMFAO)	45 (12, 11, 11, 11)	5	50	11	9	20	3
7	Sophia V.	"H Thalassa" (by Milva)	20 (6, 7, 4, 3)	5	25	5	4	9	9
8	Lefteris	"Den Tairiazete Sou Leo" (by Pantelis Pantelidis)	26 (4, 6, 7, 9)	5	31	6	8	14	6
9	Sophia K.	"Me Ta Matia Kleista" (by Giota Negka)	15 (3, 3, 5, 4)	5	20	3	6	9	8
10	Betty	"Strong Enough" (by Cher)	47 (11, 12, 12, 12)	5	52	12	10	22	1

=== Week 6 ===
The sixth episode aired on April 13, 2014 and the winner was Costas Doxas with 22 points. Doxas chose to give the money from the audience voting to "Chatzikiriakio foundation" of Piraeus.

#	Contestant	Song	Judges and Contestants				Audience	Total	Place
#	Contestant	Song	Judges^{1}	Extra^{2}	Total^{3}	Result^{4}	Audience	Total	Place
1	Sophia V.	"Kokoriko" (by Rena Vlahopoulou)	22 (6, 6, 5, 5)	5	27	5	3	8	9
2	Betty	"H Endekati Entoli" (by Nana Mouskouri)	32 (7, 11, 7, 7)	5	37	9	6	15	6
3	Eleftheria	"Edo Se Thelo Kardia Mou" (by Paola)	43 (11, 10, 11, 11)	5	48	11	10	21	2
4	Giannis	"Caruso" (by Lucio Dalla)	28 (9, 8, 3, 8)	5	33	7	11	18	4
5	Pantelis	"Ta Rialia" (by Mihalis Violaris)	27 (5, 7, 9, 6)	5	32	6	9	15	5
6	Vanessa	"Orkisou" (by Alexia)	30 (8, 5, 8, 9)	5	35	8	5	13	7
7	Costas	"Den Sou Kano Ton Agio" & "Kagkelia" (by Gogo Tsampa)	43 (10, 9, 12, 12)	5	48	10	12	22	1
8	Aris	"Puttin' On the Ritz" (by Robbie Williams)	13 (3, 3, 4, 3)	5	18	3	4	7	10
9	Sophia K.	"Je Veux" (by Zaz)	18 (4, 4, 6, 4)	5	23	4	7	11	8
10	Lefteris	"Highway to Hell" (by AC/DC)	44 (12, 12, 10, 10)	5	49	12	8	20	3

=== Week 7 ===
The seventh episode aired on April 27, 2014 and the winner was Aris Plaskasovitis with 23 points. Plaskasovitis chose to give the money from the audience voting to "Eliza foundation" of Thessaloniki.

After the judges and contestants' scores, Sophia K. and Giannis were tied. Gagaki, who was the president of the judges for the week, chose to give the final 10 points to Giannis and the 9 points to Sophia K. After the combined final scores, two contestants had 21 points. The one who got the highest score from the audience got the highest final place out of the two.

#	Contestant	Song	Judges and Contestants				Audience	Total	Place
#	Contestant	Song	Judges^{1}	Extra^{2}	Total^{3}	Result^{4}	Audience	Total	Place
1	Vanessa	"Nobody's Wife" (by Anouk)	24 (5, 7, 6, 6)	5	29	6	3	9	10
2	Pantelis	"Grease Lightning" (by John Travolta)	23 (7, 5, 8, 3)	5	28	5	6	11	9
3	Eleftheria	"Dance Again" (by Jennifer Lopez)	14 (3, 3, 3, 5)	5	19	3	10	13	5
4	Lefteris	"De Tha Ksanagapiso" (by Stelios Kazantzidis)	20 (6, 6, 4, 4)	5	25	4	7	11	8
5	Aris	"Another One Bites the Dust" (by Queen)	42 (10, 10, 12, 10)	5	47	11	12	23	1
6	Sophia K.	"Megali Stigmi" (by Bessi Argiraki)	31 (12, 4, 7, 8)	5	36	8	5	13	6
7	Sophia V.	"Think" (by Aretha Franklin)	46 (11, 12, 11, 12)	5	51	12	9	21	2
8	Costas	"Abrázame" (by Julio Iglesias)	39 (9, 11, 10, 9)	5	44	10	8	18	4
9	Betty	"Eisai San Kouneli" (by Michalis Rakintzis)	25 (4, 9, 5, 7)	5	30	7	4	11	7
10	Giannis	"Sto Keli 33" (by Giorgos Margaritis)	36 (8, 8, 9, 11)	5	41	9	11	20	3

=== Week 8: Eurovision night ===
The eighth episode aired on May 4, 2014 and the winner was Eleftheria Eleftheriou with 23 points. Eleftheriou chose to give the money from the audience voting to "Red Cross" of Cyprus.

After the judges and contestants' scores, Lefteris and Aris were tied. Zaharatos, who was the president of the judges for the week, chose to give the final 5 points to Lefteris and the 4 points to Aris. After the combined final scores, two contestants had 23 points and two contestants had 11 points. The one who got the highest score from the audience got the highest final place out of the two in both situations.

Due to the theme of the night, three of the contestants, who participated in the past in the Eurovision Song Contest, sang their entries; Sophia Vossou sang "I Anixi", Giannis Savvidakis sang "Apopse As Vrethoume" and Eleftheria Eleftheriou sang "Aphrodisiac".

#	Contestant	Song	Judges and Contestants				Audience	Total	Place
#	Contestant	Song	Judges^{1}	Extra^{2}	Total^{3}	Result^{4}	Audience	Total	Place
1	Lefteris	"Yassou Maria" (by Sarbel)	23 (7, 7, 4, 5)	—	23	5	6	11	9
2	Betty	"Diva" (by Dana International)	37 (9, 10, 7, 11)	—	37	9	4	13	6
3	Aris	"Shake It" (by Sakis Rouvas)	23 (8, 4, 8, 3)	—	23	4	7	11	8
4	Giannis	"For Real" (by Athena)	30 (6, 9, 9, 6)	—	30	8	9	17	4
5	Sophia K.	"Baila el Chiki-chiki" (by Rodolfo Chikilicuatre)	21 (3, 5, 6, 7)	5	26	7	5	12	7
6	Eleftheria	"Euphoria" (by Loreen)	37 (10, 6, 11, 10)	15	52	11	12	23	1
7	Costas	"Wild Dances" (by Ruslana)	24 (5, 8, 3, 8)	—	24	6	10	16	5
8	Vanessa	"Düm Tek Tek" (by Hadise)	16 (4, 3, 5, 4)	5	21	3	3	6	10
9	Pantelis	"Krasi, thalassa kai t' agori mou" (by Marinella)	45 (12, 12, 12, 9)	20	65	12	11	23	2
10	Sophia V.	"Molitva" (by Marija Šerifović)	44 (11, 11, 10, 12)	5	49	10	8	18	3

=== Week 9 ===
The ninth episode aired on May 11, 2014 and the winner was Giannis Savvidakis with 24 points. Savvidakis chose to give the money from the audience voting to the foundation "Grammi Gia To Paidi".

After the judges and contestants' scores, Pantelis and Aris were tied with 29 points and Costas and Eleftheria were tied with 27 points. Malfa, who was the president of the judges for the week, chose to give the final 9 points to Pantelis, the 8 points to Aris, the 7 points to Costas and the 6 points to Eleftheria. After the combined final scores, two contestants had 9 points. The one who got the highest score from the audience got the highest final place out of the two.

#	Contestant	Song	Judges and Contestants				Audience	Total	Place
#	Contestant	Song	Judges^{1}	Extra^{2}	Total^{3}	Result^{4}	Audience	Total	Place
1	Aris	"Taka Takata" (by Terris Chrisos)	24 (4, 7, 6, 7)	5	29	8	6	14	7
2	Sophia V.	"Holiday" (by Scorpions)	20 (10, 4, 3, 3)	—	20	3	3	6	10
3	Sophia K.	"Enoches" (by Theodosia Tsatsou)	24 (6, 9, 4, 5)	—	24	4	5	9	8
4	Costas	"Poso Mou Leipei" (by Sotis Volanis)	27 (9, 5, 5, 8)	—	27	7	8	15	6
5	Vanessa	"Auto To Kalokairi" (by Peggy Zina)	33 (5, 10, 8, 10)	10	43	10	7	17	4
6	Lefteris	"Do You Love Me" (by Bendaly Family)	44 (12, 12, 11, 9)	—	44	11	11	22	2
7	Pantelis	"New York City" (by Frank Sinatra)	29 (8, 8, 9, 4)	—	29	9	9	18	3
8	Giannis	"You Can Leave Your Hat On" (by Joe Cocker)	46 (11, 11, 12, 12)	35	81	12	12	24	1
9	Betty	"9 to 5" (by Dolly Parton)	26 (7, 6, 7, 6)	—	26	5	4	9	9
10	Eleftheria	"Paixnidia Erotika" (by Stan)	27 (3, 3, 10, 11)	—	27	6	10	16	5

=== Week 10 ===
The tenth episode aired on May 16, 2014. Because of the elections, this week's episode aired on Friday and not on Sunday like every week. The winner was Costas Doxas with 24 points. Doxas chose to give the money from the audience voting to "Chatzikiriakio foundation" of Piraeus.

After the judges and contestants' scores, Giannis, Eleftheria and Pantelis were tied with 26 points. Rigas, who was the president of the judges for the week, chose to give the final 7 points to Giannis, the 6 points to Pantelis and the 5 points to Eleftheria. After the combined final scores, three contestants had 11 points. The one who got the highest score from the audience got the highest final place out of the three.

#	Contestant	Song	Judges and Contestants				Audience	Total	Place
#	Contestant	Song	Judges^{1}	Extra^{2}	Total^{3}	Result^{4}	Audience	Total	Place
1	Sophia K.	"Bad Romance" (by Lady Gaga)	44 (11, 11, 11, 11)	5	49	10	11	21	2
2	Vanessa	"You Will Never Know" (by Imany)	37 (9, 9, 9, 10)	—	37	9	4	13	6
3	Giannis	"Back to Black" (by Amy Winehouse)	26 (4, 7, 7, 8)	—	26	7	10	17	3
4	Eleftheria	"Poso Ligo Me Ksereis" (by Evridiki)	26 (7, 4, 6, 9)	—	26	5	9	14	5
5	Pantelis	"Peirazei Pou Eimai Firma" & "Erthen Ksan I Kereki" (by Giannis Floriniotis)	16 (3, 5, 4, 4)	10	26	6	6	12	7
6	Aris	"Against All Odds (Take a Look at Me Now)" (by Phil Collins)	17 (8, 3, 3, 3)	—	17	3	8	11	8
7	Betty	"To Mistiko" (Something's Gotten Hold of My Heart) (by Vicky Leandros)	28 (6, 8, 8, 6)	—	28	8	3	11	10
8	Lefteris	"Ougaga Boom Boom" (by Harry Klynn)	21 (5, 6, 5, 5)	—	21	4	7	11	9
9	Costas	"Personal Jesus" (by Marilyn Manson)	48 (12, 12, 12, 12)	20	68	12	12	24	1
10	Sophia V.	"I Serenata" (by Arleta)	37 (10, 10, 10, 7)	15	52	11	5	16	4

=== Week 11 ===
The eleventh episode aired on June 1, 2014. The winner was Pantelis Kanarakis with 24 points. Kanarakis chose to give the money from the audience voting to the orphanage "Melissa" of Thessaloniki.

After the combined final scores, two contestants had 8 points, two contestants had 12 points and three contestants had 18 points. The ones who got the highest score from the audience got the highest final place out of the two or three.

#	Contestant	Song	Judges and Contestants				Audience	Total	Place
#	Contestant	Song	Judges^{1}	Extra^{2}	Total^{3}	Result^{4}	Audience	Total	Place
1	Giannis	"Fige Ki Ase Me (I Xaristiki Voli)" (by Panos Gavalas)	38 (11, 11, 11, 5)	—	38	9	9	18	4
2	Betty	"Saving All My Love for You" (by Whitney Houston)	31 (9, 8, 7, 7)	5	36	8	3	11	8
3	Sophia V.	"San Perpatas Parapatas" (by Filio Pirgaki)	42 (10, 10, 10, 12)	—	42	10	8	18	5
4	Aris	"Friday I'm in Love" (by The Cure)	22 (7, 4, 5, 6)	5	27	6	6	12	7
5	Sophia K.	"Mambo" (by Sperantza Vrana)	17 (4, 3, 6, 4)	5	23	5	7	12	6
6	Lefteris	"Pali Pali" (by Michalis Tzouganakis)	18 (5, 7, 3, 3)	—	18	3	5	8	9
7	Eleftheria	"Express" (by Christina Aguilera)	32 (6, 9, 8, 9)	—	32	7	11	18	3
8	Costas	"Can't Help Falling in Love" (by Elvis Presley)	33 (8, 6, 9, 10)	10	43	11	10	21	2
9	Pantelis	"Duniya Mein Hum Aaye Hai To Jeena Hi Padega" (by Nargis, playback singer Lata Mangeshkar)	47 (12, 12, 12, 11)	25	72	12	12	24	1
10	Vanessa	"Iparhi Zoi" (by Despina Vandi)	20 (3, 5, 4, 8)	—	20	4	4	8	10

=== Week 12: Semi-finals ===
The twelfth episode aired on June 8, 2014. The winner was Giannis Savvidakis with 23 points. Savvidakis chose to give the money from the audience voting to the foundation "Grammi Gia To Paidi".

After the judges and contestants' scores, Costas and Eleftheria were tied with 32 points. Zaharatos, who was the president of the judges for the week, chose to give the final 8 points to Costas and the 7 points to Eleftheria. After the combined final scores, two contestants had 19 points and two contestants had 9 points. The ones who got the highest score from the audience got the highest final place out of the two.

In the semi-finals, the four contestants with the highest cumulative scores from all 12 weeks were announced and were the ones to compete in the finals. The four finalists were; Giannis Savvidakis with 239 points, Pantelis Kanarakis with 216 points, Costas Doxas with 208 points and Lefteris Eleftheriou with 194 points. It was also the last time the judges were going to score the contestants since the winner is decided only by the audience.

#	Contestant	Song	Judges and Contestants				Audience	Total	Place
#	Contestant	Song	Judges^{1}	Extra^{2}	Total^{3}	Result^{4}	Audience	Total	Place
1	Aris	"Hot n Cold" (by Katy Perry)	14 (4, 3, 3, 4)	5	19	4	5	9	9
2	Vanessa	"Den Kanei Krio Stin Ellada" (by Locomondo)	21 (5, 6, 5, 5)	5	26	5	3	8	10
3	Giannis	"Whole Lotta Love" (by Led Zeppelin)	46 (11, 12, 11, 12)	5	51	11	12	23	1
4	Sophia V.	"Habanera" (by Maria Callas)	30 (9, 9, 6, 6)	10	40	9	10	19	3
5	Betty	"Mein Herr" (by Liza Minnelli)	30 (8, 8, 7, 7)	—	30	6	4	10	7
6	Eleftheria	"Sose Me" & "Aftos o Anthropos" (by Rita Sakellariou)	27 (6, 4, 9, 8)	5	32	7	7	14	6
7	Lefteris	"Nessuno Mi Può Giudicare" (by Caterina Caselli)	41 (12, 10, 10, 9)	15	56	12	11	23	2
8	Costas	"Lathos Epochi" (by Petros Gaitanos)	32 (7, 7, 8, 10)	—	32	8	8	16	5
9	Pantelis	"Cuban Pete" (by Jim Carrey)	44 (10, 11, 12, 11)	5	49	10	9	19	4
10	Sophia K.	"Den Thelo Na Xereis" (by Anna Vissi)	15 (3, 5, 4, 3)	—	15	3	6	9	8

=== Week 13: Final ===
The thirteenth and final live aired on June 15, 2014 and the winner of the show was Giannis Savvidakis. The income from the audience voting for the final, was divided in ten equal parts and was given to all ten foundations that the contestants were representing during the thirteen live shows.

At the beginning of the show, Bekatorou performed the songs "Genghis Khan" by Lakis Giordanelli and "Ksafnika m'agapas" by The Idols. In the second song, she was accompanied by Tonis Sfinos.

#	Contestant	Song	Result^{5}
1	Giannis	"H Tigri" ( by Psarantonis)	Winner
2	Costas	"Sen Trope" (by Azis)	Runner-up
3	Lefteris	"Roadhouse Blues" (by The Doors)	3rd place
4	Pantelis	"Tautotita" (by Giorgos Marinos)	4th place
5/6	Sophia K.-Aris	"The Look" (by Roxette)	Did; Not; Scored
7/8	Sophia V.-Betty	"Se Bastasse Una Canzone" (by Luciano Pavarotti & Eros Ramazzotti)	Did; Not; Scored
9/10	Eleftheria-Vanessa	"H Agapi Thelei Dio" (by Aliki Vougiouklaki & Dimitris Papamichael)	Did; Not; Scored

Notes
1. The points that judges gave in order (Malfa, Rigas, Gagaki, Zaharatos).
2. Each contestant gave 5 points to a contestant of their choice.
3. Total of both extra and judges' score.
4. Result of both extra and judges' score.
5. In the final, only the audience voted for the winner and the one with the most votes won the competition.

== Results chart ==
Contestant	Wk 1	Wk 2	Wk 3	Wk 4	Wk 5	Wk 6	Wk 7	Wk 8	Wk 9	Wk 10	Wk 11	Wk 12	Wk 13	Total	Average
Giannis	3rd 21 points	10th 6 points	3rd 20 points	1st 24 points	2nd 22 points	3rd 20 points	6th 14 points	4th 18 points	3rd 20 points	4th 17 points	5th 16 points	10th 6 points	1st	204	17
Stelios	1st 24 points	3rd 20 points	2nd 23 points	2nd 22 points	10th 7 points	2nd 23 points	10th 6 points	3rd 21 points	2nd 23 points	5th 17 points	4th 18 points	8th 10 points	3rd	214	17.83
Marianna	2nd 21 points	4th 17 points	4th 18 points	3rd 20 points	9th 7 points	5th 16 points	5th 16 points	2nd 22 points	1st 23 points	7th 12 points	2nd 21 points	9th 8 points	4th	201	16.75
Evita	4th 16 points	2nd 22 points	5th 16 points	4th 18 points	8th 10 points	4th 18 points	4th 17 points	5th 16 points	5th 16 points	6th 14 points	3rd 21 points	7th 12 points	—	196	16.3
Dafni	5th 16 points	1st 24 points	6th 14 points	5th 15 points	7th 12 points	1st 23 points	3rd 17 points	1st 24 points	4th 18 points	8th 9 points	1st 24 points	6th 15 points	2nd	211	17.58
Akis	6th 16 points	5th 17 points	7th 11 points	6th 15 points	6th 14 points	10th 6 points	9th 8 points	6th 13 points	6th 14 points	9th 9 points	10th 6 points	1st 24 points	—	153	12.75
Stavros	7th 12 points	6th 14 points	8th 11 points	10th 6 points	5th 16 points	9th 8 points	8th 10 points	8th 10 points	7th 12 points	1st 24 points	9th 8 points	5th 15 points	—	146	12.16
Eva	10th 7 points	7th 11 points	1st 23 points	9th 8 points	4th 18 points	8th 10 points	7th 12 points	9th 8 points	8th 10 points	2nd 22 points	8th 10 points	4th 18 points	—	157	13.08
Agapi	8th 10 points	8th 11 points	10th 7 points	8th 10 points	1st 24 points	7th 12 points	2nd 23 points	10th 6 points	9th 8 points	3rd 20 points	7th 13 points	3rd 20 points	—	164	13.66
Antonis	9th 7 points	9th 8 points	9th 7 points	7th 12 points	3rd 20 points	6th 14 points	1st 23 points	7th 13 points	10th 6 points	10th 6 points	6th 13 points	2nd 22 points	—	151	12.58

indicates the contestant came first that week.
indicates the contestant came last that week.
performed but didn't score
indicates the winning contestant.
indicates the runner-up contestant.
indicates the third-place contestant.

== Ratings ==
#	Episode	Date	Timeslot (EET)	Official ratings (in millions)	Rank (daily)	Rank (weekly)	Share (household)	Share (adults 15–44)	Source
1	Week 1	March 9, 2014	Sunday 9:15 pm	1.624	1	5	40.5%	43.5%	
2	Week 2	March 16, 2014	Sunday 9:15 pm	1.568	1	5	38.4%	38.2%	
3	Week 3	March 23, 2014	Sunday 9:15 pm	1.402	1	14	36.2%	35.8%	
4	Week 4	March 30, 2014	Sunday 9:15 pm	1.596	1	6	38.2%	40%	
5	Week 5	April 6, 2014	Sunday 9:15 pm	1.278	1	12	32.4%	33%	
6	Week 6	April 13, 2014	Sunday 9:15 pm	1.471	1	7	37.5%	38%	
7	Week 7	April 27, 2014	Sunday 9:15 pm	1.494	1	1	38.3%	39.3%	
8	Week 8: Eurovision night	May 4, 2014	Sunday 9:15 pm	1.511	1	3	39.1%	40.6%	
9	Week 9	May 11, 2014	Sunday 9:15 pm	1.326	1	10	37%	39.7%	
10	Week 10	May 16, 2014	Friday 9:15 pm	1.045	2	13	28%	32.4%	
11	Week 11	June 1, 2014	Sunday 9:15 pm	1.261	1	8	36.8%	35%	
12	Week 12: Semi-finals	June 8, 2014	Sunday 9:15 pm	1.215	1	8	38.8%	34.3%	
13	Week 13: Final	June 15, 2014	Sunday 9:15 pm			5	39.2%	40.2%	
