= Maggira Sisters =

Greek television presenters and comedians

- Origin: Xanthi, Greece
- Genres: Parody
- Years active: 2000s-present
- Members: Betty Maggira; Mathildi Maggira

Betty Maggira (Greek: Μπέττυ Μαγγίρα) and Mathildi Maggira (Greek: Ματθίλδη Μαγγίρα), also known as the Maggira Sisters (Greek: αδελφές Μαγγίρα), are two Greek television presenters and comedians. They are known for hosting the Greek Eurovision Song Contest selections and also being the commentators at the Eurovision Song Contest for ERT, the Greek network broadcasting the event. They began their careers as a show duo where they impersonate other musical artists and produce musical-type shows that often include cabaret themes. The two sisters have also worked with Greek singer, Sakis Rouvas, in a successful concert series at STARZ from 2008 to 2009 and both have been featured as solo acts in various television shows.

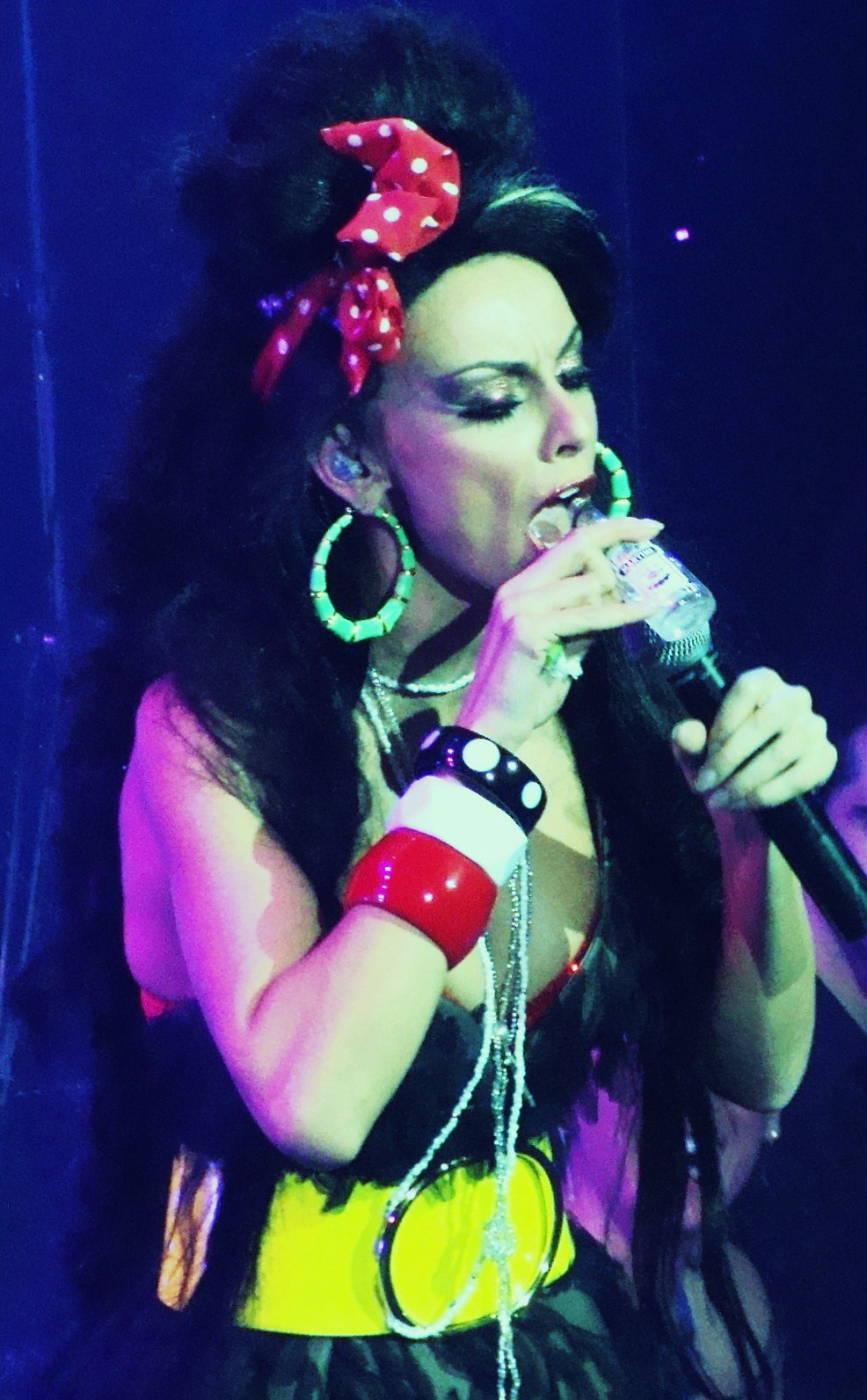
Betty Maggira performing at STARZ as Amy Winehouse.

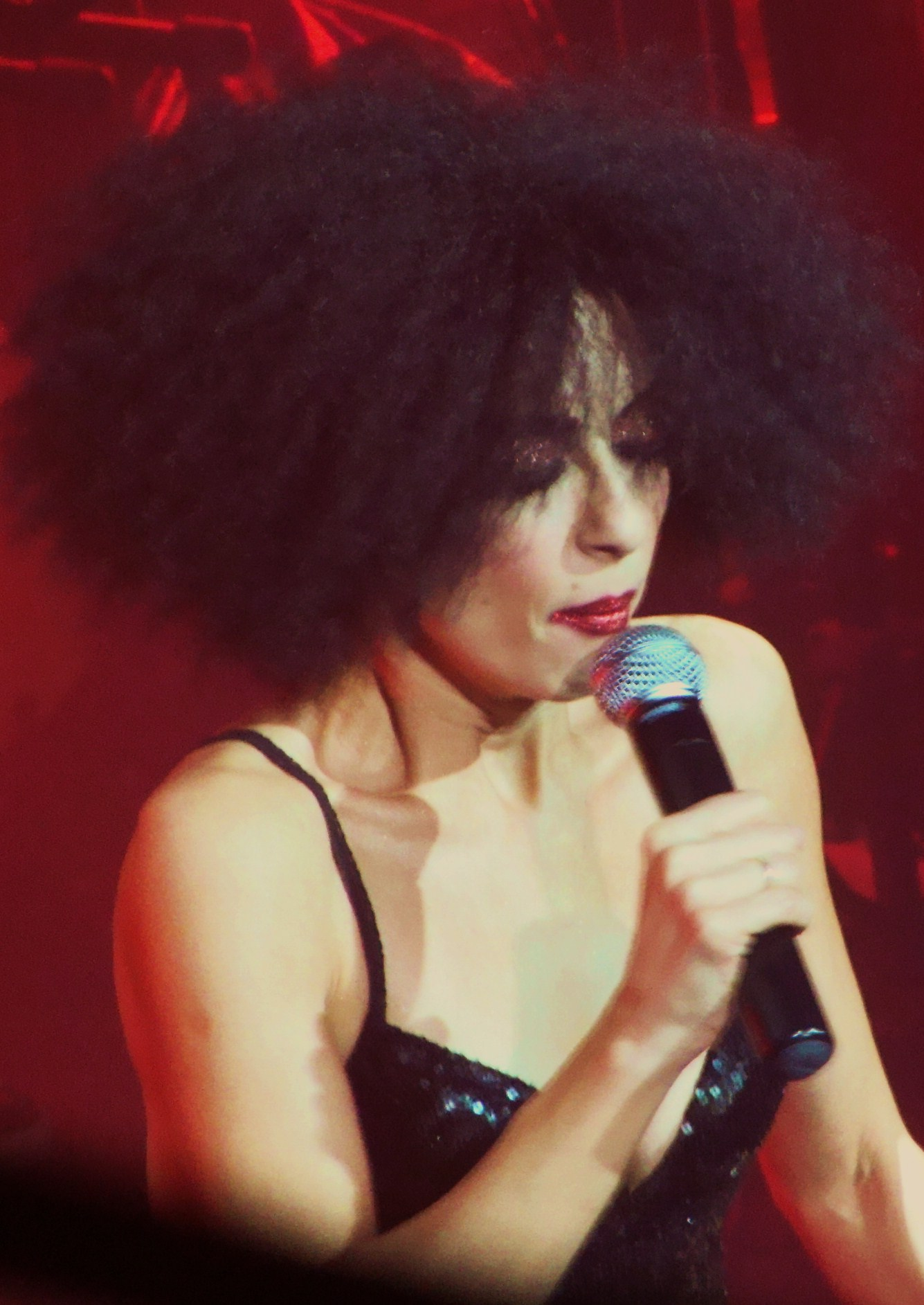
Mathildi Maggira performing at STARZ as Diana Ross.

== Filmography ==
- Greek Nation Final (2008)
- Maggiremata (2008–Present)
- Greek National Final (2009)

== Concert series ==
- The Maggiras Show (2007)
- STARZ (with Sakis Rouvas) (2008–2009)

== Betty Maggira ==
=== Filmography ===
==== Television ====
Year	Title	Role(s)	Notes
1991	Thracian Beauty Pageant	Herself (contestant)	Star Thrace '91
1991	National Annual Beauty Pageant of Greece	Herself (contestant)	TV special
1992	Look of the Year	Herself (contestant)	TV special
1994	The Generation of 40	Philip's friend	1 episode
1994	The pink buble	Titika	Episode: "The party of 6th grade high school"
1995	Those and the others	Betty	Episode: "Polished horn"
1996	Remote control	Herself (co-host)	Weekend game show
1996-1999	Beauty Cats	Herself (host)	Daytime beauty talk show
1999-2000	Nylon	Herself (host)	Daytime talk show on Makedonia TV
2000-2002	Make yourself at home	Herself (co-host)	Daytime talk show on Mega Channel
2001-2003	Mega Star	Herself (host)	Saturday talk show on Mega Channel; also creator
2003-2004	No more blah blah...	Herself (host)	Late night talk show on ALPHA
2004-2005	Piatsa Kolonaki	Teti Stamatopoulou	Lead role / 22 episodes
2005-2006	Lifestyle	Herself (host)	Saturday talk show on Alter
2006	The Mismatched	Madonna	5 episodes
2006	Marriage with everything	Nadia	Episode: "Marriage is a prison"
2006-2007	Honorable Cuckolds	Eva Kolasi	Lead role / 32 episodes
2007-2008	TV Stars: Let's present youselves	Herself (host)	Talent show
2008	National Annual Beauty Pageant of Cyprus	Herself (host)	TV special
2008-2009	Eurovision Song Contest - Greek Finals	Herself (host)	TV special
2008-2009	Maggiremata	Herself (host)	Late night talk show on NET
2010-2011	Exclusive	Herself (host)	Sunday talk show on ALPHA
2014	Your Face Sounds Familiar	Herself (contestant)	13 episodes; season 2
2014-2015	Everything's On	Herself (host)	Daytime talk show on ALPHA
2015	Don't start moaning	Jessica	1 episode
2016	Daddy Cool	Alice	2 episodes
2017	Your Family or Mine	Lola Papakosta Tsimbirdoni	Episode: "Run Lola, run!"
2017	MadWalk - The Fashion Music Project	Herself (performance)	TV special
2017	My Style Rocks	Herself (guest judge)	Gala 8; season 1
2018	Greece's Got Talent	Herself (guest judge)	Episode: "Judge Cut #3"
2018-2019	My Style Rocks	Herself (judge)	Season 2
2019-2020	Home Is	Athina	Lead role / 38 episodes (4 unaired)
2021	Your Face Sounds Familiar: All Star	Herself (contestant)	11 episodes; season 7
2021-2023	Who's so morning?	Herself (host)	Daytime talk show on Open TV
2023- today	I love weekend	Herself (host)	Weekend talk show on ANT1 TV
