= Nikos Ganos =

Greek singer (born 1983)

Nikos Ganos Νίκος Γκάνος
- Born: 22 July 1983 (age 43); Athens, Greece
- Genres: Pop; R&B; dance
- Occupations: Singer; model
- Years active: 2003–present
- Labels: Heaven Music; Spin Records

Nikos Ganos (Greek: Νίκος Γκάνος; born 22 July 1983), also known as Nicko, is a Greek singer and former model.

== Career ==
In 2004, Ganos participated in the first and only series of Super Idol, the former Greek version of the British talent show hit Pop Idol. He was in the "Bottom 2 or 3" from weeks 4 to 7 and was eliminated in third place on week 8, the last week before the final. Since then Ganos has continued to release singles that have become hits in Greece and has worked with some of the biggest names of the Greek music scene like Giannis Parios, Kaiti Garbi, Giorgos Mazonakis and Marinella. In 2010 he released the song "Last Summer" which was the most successful song in Greece that year. In 2012, he performed "Break Me in the Dark" (a remix of "Break Me"') with Katerina Stikoudi at the MAD Video Music Awards. In 2013 he released his new song "I'm in love". In April 2013, Ganos competed in the first Greek series of Your Face Sounds Familiar and was eliminated in week 12. Each week he disguised as and performed song by famous singers like George Michael, Justin Timberlake, John Lennon, Notis Sfakianakis, Justin Bieber, Giorgos Mazonakis, Prince, Zozo Sapountzaki, and winner of the Eurovision Song Contest 2003, Sertab Erener.

=== Eurovision Song Contest ===
It was reported in November 2018 that ERT had approached Ganos about potentially representing Greece at the Eurovision Song Contest 2019 in Tel-Aviv, Israel. Ganos refused to confirm whether any talks had taken place but did express interest.

Ganos entered a song titled "Yamas" into Ethnikós Telikós in a bid to represent Greece at the Eurovision Song Contest 2025 in Basel, Switzerland. ERT did not select "Yamas" for the national final and the song was later released to the public on 13 February 2025.

== Personal life ==
Nikos Ganos was born and lives in Athens, Greece. He has toured around Greece. He has two tattoos, one of an ancient Greek soldier's helmet on his back and "family tree" written in Hindi on his left arm.

== Discography ==
=== Singles ===
- "Koita ti ekanes (EP including 5 songs)" (2010)
- "Efyga" (2010)
- "Last Summer" (2010)
- "Last Summer (EP including 6 remixes)" (2010)
- "Break Me" (2011)
- "This Love is Killing Me" (2011)
- "Say My Name" (2012)
- "I'm in Love" (2012)
- "Time After Time" (2013)
- "Nea mera" (feat. OGE) (2013)
- "Monos" (2014)
- "Walking alone" (2014)
- "Hameni Atlantida (feat. James Sky)" (2014)
- "Sta vathia" (2015)
- "Ti na leme" (2016)
- "Pirazei" (2016)
- "To Allo Mou Miso" (2017)
- "To Krevati" (2018)
- "Katamata" (2020)
- "Deja Vu" feat Tasos Xiarcho (2022)
- "Taboo" (2024)
- "Yamas" (2025)
