= Panos Gavalas =

Panos Gavalas (Greek: Πάνος Γαβαλάς; October 26, 1926 – December 3, 1988) was a Greek singer. He was born and died in Athens.

== Discography ==
Year	Title	Greek title	English title
1982	Axehastes Epityhies	Αξέχαστες Επιτυχίες Νο 2	Unforgettable Success
1983	Axehastes Epityhies No. 2	Αξέχαστες Επιτυχίες	Unforgettable Success 2
1985	I Chrysi Epochi	Η Χρυσή Εποχή Νο 1	The Golden Era
1984	I Chrysi Epochi No 2	Η Χρυσή Εποχή Νο 2	The Golden Era II
1984	I Chrysi Epochi No 3	Η Χρυσή Εποχή Νο 3 – 1984	The Golden Era III
1984	Einai Ora Gia Agkalia	Είναι Ωρα Για Αγκαλιά	It Is Time for a Hug
1985	I Chrysi Epochi No 15	Η Χρυσή Εποχή Νο 15	The Golden Era XV
1985	Ta Portreta Tis	Τα Πορτραίτα Της	Their Portrait (Minos-EMI
1985	I Chrysi Epochi No 5	Η Χρυσή Εποχή Νο 5	The Golden Era V
1986	Mia Anasa	Μια Ανάσα	One Breath
1987	Dyo Dyo	Δυο Δυο	Two Two
'1989	Tragoudontas Tis Epoches No 1 – Afieromeno Exairetika	Τραγουδώντας Τις Εποχές Νο 1 Αφιερωμένο Εξαιρετικά	Singing Through The Times 1
1991	Ta Laika Tou Panou Gavala	Τα Λαϊκά Του Πάνου Γαβαλά	The Folk Songs From Panos Gavalas
1992	Mazi	Μαζί	Together
1992	Tragoudontas Tis Epoches No 2	Τραγουδώντας Τις Εποχές No2	Singing Through The Times 2
1994	Apo Tous Thisavrous Ton 45 Strofon	2000Από Τους Θυσαυρούς Των 45 Στροφών	From The Treasures of the 45 Turns
1995	Mia Peripeteia	Μια Περιπέτεια	One Adventure
1996	Laikes Sygkiniseis	Λαϊκές Συγκινήσεις	–
1996	Tragoudia Apo Tis 45 Strofes	Τραγούδια Απο Τις 45 Στροφές	Songs From The 45 Turns
2000	Dyo – Dyo	Δυό – Δυό	Two – Two
