= Dafni Bokota =

Greek singer and presenter

Dafni Bokota (Greek: Δάφνη Μπόκοτα; born 1960) is a Greek singer, presenter and former spokesperson for the Greek national broadcaster Hellenic Broadcasting Corporation (ERT).

== Biography ==
Dafni Bokota was born in Koukaki, Athens, Greece in 1960. She studied English and French literature and while working in ERT and released an LP with her own compositions. The title of the record was Dafni Bokota kai Saboter and the singles "Diva" and "Viper Nora" were hits. She had tried to represent Greece in the Eurovision Song Contest in 1983 with her song "Juliet". Bokota is best known for presenting for ERT the Jeux Sans Frontières and the Eurovision Song Contest, the latter for eighteen years from 1987 until 2004. In 2005, she was fired and replaced by Swedish born reporter Alexandra Pascalidou to present the 2005 contest. After the event, she published a book with her memories of the Contest, which was published in two editions.

Bokota is married and has a son. She is involved in the politics, while in 2003-04 she was a judge in the Greek reality TV show Fame Story.
