= Isaias Matiaba =

Greek singer-songwriter

Isaias Matiaba Ησαΐας Ματιάμπα
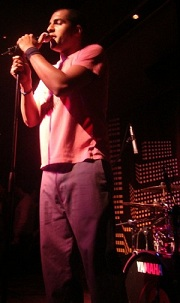

Background information
- Born: 18 December 1983 (age 42); Ioannina, Greece
- Genres: Pop rock, Afro pop, Folk
- Years active: 2002–present
- Labels: Minos EMI, Universal Music Greece, Family the Label, Warner Records, Heaven, Cobalt

Isaias Matiaba (Greek: Ησαΐας Ματιάμπα) (born 18 December 1983 in Ioannina, Greece) is a Greek singer and songwriter.

== Early life ==
Isaias Matiaba was born in Ioannina, Greece on 18 December 1983 to a Congolese father and a Greek mother. From an early age, he began studying classical piano and took classical singing lessons.

== Discography ==
=== Studio albums ===
- (2003) – Words are not forgotten
- (2005) – I look at the world
- (2008) – I hate you
- (2009) – We expect
- (2011) – I want (what you want)
- (2012) – Dreaming – Full Pack
