= Your Face Sounds Familiar (Greek TV series) series 7 =

Your Face Sounds Familiar
- Season 7
- Winner: Tania Breazou
- No. of episodes: 11

Release
- Original network: ANT1
- Original release: February 28 – May 30, 2021

Series chronology
- ← Previous; Series 6

Your Face Sounds Familiar is a Greek reality show airing on ANT1. The seventh season, known also as Your Face Sounds Familiar – All Star, premiered on February 21, 2021 and featured ten contestants from the previous seasons, as the all stars.

After the cancellation of the previous edition because of the coronavirus pandemic in Greece, it was rumored that the sixth season will continue in September 2020. In October 2020, it was announced that the show will return on 2021, with the new contestants being ten stars from the previous editions.

== Cast ==
=== Host and judges ===
Maria Bekatorou returned to host the show for the seventh time and the judging panel changed from the previous edition. The new judging panel consists of Katerina Papoutsaki (who served as judge in season 3), Takis Zacharatos (who served as judge in season 2), Michalis Reppas and Kostis Maravegias.

=== Contestants ===
Ten contestants in total competed in the seventh season; four women and six men. All contestants have participated in previous seasons of YFSF:

On March 5, 2021, Costas Doxas announced his withdrawal from the season, due to a post by his ex-wife, which states that he abused her. Costas Doxas reported that the post and the statements of his ex-wife are unfounded.

Celebrity	Previous		Occupation	Average score	Status
Celebrity	Season	Place	Occupation	Average score	Status
Tania Breazou	6	—N/a	Singer	169	Winner
Ian Stratis	5	1st	Singer	173	Runner-up
Isaias Matiaba	4	2nd	Singer	168	Third place
Thanasis Alevras	1	1st	Actor	177	Fourth place
Betty Maggira	2	8th	Actress, TV presenter	157	—N/a
Matthildi Maggira	3	4th	Actress, TV presenter	149	—N/a
Katerina Stikoudi	5	2nd	Singer	145	—N/a
Krateros Katsoulis	1	2nd	Actor, TV presenter	134	—N/a
Lefteris Eleftheriou	2	3rd	Actor	123	—N/a
Costas Doxas	2	2nd	Actor, singer	20	—N/a

=== Voting ===
The jury voting slightly changed compared to other seasons. The traditional voting (3, 4, 5, 6, 7, 8, 9, 10, 11, 12) changed and the jury now awards 2 sets of 7 points, 2 sets of 8 points, 2 sets of 9, 2 sets of 10, a set of 11 points and a set of 12 points.

Due to the restrictions, social distances and the ongoing lockdown in Greece, there is no live audience. While there is no audience in the studio, the audience watches the live show through Zoom and votes from there for their favorite contestant.

== Weekly results ==
=== Week 1 ===
The premiere aired on February 28, 2021, and the winner was Costas with 20 points. Costas chose to give the money from the audience voting to the organization "Training & Rehabilitation Center for the Blind People".

After the judges and contestants' scores, Ian and Costas were tied with 37 points and Thanasis and Betty were tied with 33 points. Papoutsaki, who was the president of the judges for the week, chose to give the final 9 points to Ian and the 8 points to Costas and chose to give the 4 points to Thanasis and the 3 points to Betty. After the combined final scores, two contestants had 20 points, other two contestants had 13 points and other two contestants had 12 points. The one who got the highest score from the audience got the highest final place and the one with the lowest got the lowest place.

#	Contestant	Performing as	Song	Judges and Contestants				Audience	Total	Place	Bonus given to
#	Contestant	Performing as	Song	Judges^{1}	Extra^{2}	Total^{3}	Result^{4}	Audience	Total	Place	Bonus given to
1	Betty	Lady Miss Kier of Deee-Lite	"Groove Is in the Heart"	28 (7, 7, 7, 7)	5	33	3	7	10	10	Tania
2	Lefteris	Constantine Cullen	"Tragila"	34 (10, 9, 7, 8)	–	34	5	11	16	4	Tania
3	Katerina	Shakira	"Girl Like Me"	31 (8, 8, 8, 7)	5	36	7	5	12	9	Tania
4	Thanasis	Anna Vissi	"Pseftika"	33 (7, 8, 10, 8)	–	33	4	9	13	6	Tania
5	Ian	Robbie Williams	"Let Me Entertain You"	37 (8, 10, 10, 9)	–	37	9	10	19	3	Matthildi
6	Costas	Despina Vandi	"Anaveis Foties"	37 (11, 7, 9, 10)	–	37	8	12	20	1	Matthildi
7	Isaias	The Weeknd	"Blinding Lights"	38 (9, 10, 9, 10)	–	38	10	3	13	7	Matthildi
8	Krateros	Vasilis Papakonstantinou	"Prin to telos"	35 (9, 9, 8, 9)	–	35	6	6	12	8	Matthildi
9	Tania	Miley Cyrus	"Nothing Breaks Like a Heart"	48 (12, 12, 12, 12)	20	68	12	8	20	2	Katerina
10	Matthildi	Vicky Moscholiou	"Aliti"	43 (10, 11, 11, 11)	20	63	11	3	15	5	Betty

Notes
1. The points that judges gave in order (Zacharatos, Papoutsaki, Maraveyas, Reppas).
2. Each contestant gave 5 points to a contestant of their choice.
3. Total of both extra and judges' score.
4. Result of both extra and judges' score.

=== Week 2 ===
The second episode aired on March 7, 2021, and the winner was Katerina with 23 points. Katerina chose to give the money from the audience voting to the organization "Paidiko Chorio SOS" (Children's Village SOS).

Due to Costas' withdrawal, Ian (who was going to perform as Natassa Theodoridou) didn't participate in this episode, due to a duet with Costas' character (who was going to perform as Triantaphillos). Also, due to the show being pre-recorded, the points of Costas didn't counted and showed during the live show, instead of Ian's where didn't showed during the live show but counted normally.

After the judges and contestants' scores, Thanasis and Tania were tied with 35 points. Zacharatos, who was the president of the judges for the week, chose to give the final 7 points to Thanasis and the 6 points to Tania. After the combined final scores, two contestants had 16 points. The one who got the highest score from the audience got the highest final place and the one with the lowest got the lowest place.

#	Contestant	Performing as	Song	Judges and Contestants				Audience	Total	Place	Bonus given to
#	Contestant	Performing as	Song	Judges^{5}	Extra^{6}	Total^{7}	Result^{8}	Audience	Total	Place	Bonus given to
1	Matthildi	Lady Gaga	"Bad Romance"	35 (9, 8, 8, 10)	5	40	9	4	13	6	Lefteris
2	Thanasis	Josephine Wendel	"Ti"	35 (8, 10, 10, 7)	–	35	7	8	15	5	Lefteris
3	Betty	Antzy Samiou	"Mi Fevgis Apopse"	34 (8, 9, 8, 9)	–	34	5	11	16	3	Matthildi
4	Tania	Axl Rose of Guns N' Roses	"Paradise City"	35 (9, 8, 10, 8)	–	35	6	10	16	4	Lefteris
5	Krateros	Vasilis Karras ft. Konstantina	"To Dilitirio"	29 (7, 7, 7, 8)	–	29	4	3	7	8	Lefteris
6	Lefteris	Thanasis Veggos	"To Tragoudi tou Arrostou"	47 (12, 12, 12, 11)	20	67	12	6	18	2	Katerina
7	Isaias	Madclip	"Kotera"	28 (7, 7, 7, 7)	–	28	3	9	12	7	Katerina
8	Katerina	Dimitra Papiou	"Afti i Nihta Menei"	42 (10, 9, 11, 12)	10	52	11	12	23	1	Lefteris
—N/a	Costas	Triantaphillos	"Mi Girisis Xana"	Withdrew							
—N/a	Ian	Natassa Theodoridou	"Mi Girisis Xana"	Not able to participate							

Notes
5. The points that judges gave in order (Zacharatos, Papoutsaki, Maraveyas, Reppas).
6. Each contestant gave 5 points to a contestant of their choice.
7. Total of both extra and judges' score.
8. Result of both extra and judges' score.

=== Week 3 ===
The third episode aired on March 14, 2021, and the winner was Thanasis with 23 points. Thanasis chose to give the money from the audience voting to the organization "KEPEA Orizontes".

After the judges and contestants' scores, Betty and Lefteris were tied with 33 points. Maraveyas, who was the president of the judges for the week, chose to give the final 6 points to Betty and the 5 points to Lefteris. After the combined final scores, two contestants had 20 points and two contestants had 11 points. The one who got the highest score from the audience got the highest final place and the one with the lowest got the lowest place.

#	Contestant	Performing as	Song	Judges and Contestants				Audience	Total	Place	Bonus given to
#	Contestant	Performing as	Song	Judges^{1}	Extra^{2}	Total^{3}	Result^{4}	Audience	Total	Place	Bonus given to
1	Lefteris	Konstantinos Argyros	"Athina Mou"	33 (7, 8, 9, 9)	–	33	5	3	8	9	Ian
2	Ian	Steven Tyler of Aerosmith	"I Don't Wanna Miss A Thing"	39 (10, 10, 10, 9)	15	54	11	9	20	3	Thanasis
3	Betty	Bessy Argyraki	"Akatallilo gia Anilikous"	33 (8, 9, 8, 8)	–	33	6	5	11	6	Katerina
4	Katerina	James Blunt	"You're Beautiful"	42 (12, 11, 9, 10)	5	47	10	8	18	4	Isaias
5	Thanasis	Dinos Iliopoulos	"Ena Toso Da Klarino"	45 (9, 12, 12, 12)	10	55	12	11	23	1	Krateros
6	Isaias	Eftihia Fanarioti	"S' Eho Kanei Theo"	32 (9, 8, 8, 7)	10	42	8	12	20	2	Thanasis
7	Tania	Bebe Rexha	"Say My Name"	39 (10, 9, 10, 10)	–	39	7	4	11	7	Isaias
8	Matthildi	Angela Dimitriou	"Margarites"	30 (8, 7, 7, 8)	–	30	3	6	9	8	Ian
9	Krateros	Stephan Remmler of Trio	"Da Da Da"	39 (7, 10, 11, 11)	5	44	9	7	16	5	Ian

Notes
1. The points that judges gave in order (Zacharatos, Papoutsaki, Maraveyas, Reppas).
2. Each contestant gave 5 points to a contestant of their choice.
3. Total of both extra and judges' score.
4. Result of both extra and judges' score.

=== Week 4: Best Previous Appearance Night ===
The fourth episode (Note: For the fourth live, the production of the show decided to let the audience chose that week's performances for the contestants. The performances that were chosen were the best performances of each contestant from their previous participation.) aired on March 21, 2021, and the winner was Tania with 22 points. Tania chose to give the money from the audience voting to the organization "Ena Oniro, Mia Efhi".

After the judges and contestants' scores, Katerina and Krateros were tied with 32 points. Reppas, who was the president of the judges for the week, chose to give the final 6 points to Katerina and the 5 points to Krateros. After the combined final scores, two contestants had 21 points and two contestants had 12 points. The one who got the highest score from the audience got the highest final place and the one with the lowest got the lowest place.

#	Contestant	Performing as	Song	Judges and Contestants				Audience	Total	Place	Bonus given to
#	Contestant	Performing as	Song	Judges^{1}	Extra^{2}	Total^{3}	Result^{4}	Audience	Total	Place	Bonus given to
1	Lefteris	Sakis Rouvas	"Tora Arhizoun ta Diskola"	28 (7, 7, 7, 7)	–	28	4	6	10	9	Isaias
2	Katerina	Dimitra Galani	"An"	32 (8, 7, 8, 9)	–	32	6	5	11	8	Betty
3	Matthildi	Rena Vlahopoulou	"Kerkira, Kerkira / To Peteinari"	36 (8, 8, 9, 11)	10	46	9	12	21	2	Isaias
4	Betty	Cher	"Dov'è l'amore"	33 (9, 9, 7, 8)	5	38	8	4	12	7	Isaias
5	Krateros	Dionysis Savvopoulos	"Me Milas Allo Gi' Agapi"	32 (7, 9, 8, 8)	–	32	5	7	12	6	Tania
6	Thanasis	Stella Konitopoulou	"To Kamini / Ta Sfalmata Sou Pelaga"	33 (9, 8, 9, 7)	–	33	7	10	17	5	Isaias
7	Tania	Tzeni Vanou	"Erota Mou Anepanalipte"	45 (12, 12, 11, 10)	5	50	11	11	22	1	Matthildi
8	Isaias	Stelios Kazantzidis	"To Teleutaio Vrady Mou"	43 (10, 11, 10, 12)	20	63	12	9	21	3	Ian
9	Ian	Freddie Mercury of Queen	"Under Pressure"	42 (11, 10, 12, 9)	5	47	10	8	18	4	Matthildi

Notes
1. The points that judges gave in order (Zacharatos, Papoutsaki, Maraveyas, Reppas).
2. Each contestant gave 5 points to a contestant of their choice.
3. Total of both extra and judges' score.
4. Result of both extra and judges' score.

=== Week 5 ===
The fifth episode aired on March 28, 2021, and the winner was Isaias with 23 points. Isaias chose to give the money from the audience voting to the organization "Protipo Ethniko Nipiotrofio of Kallithea".

After the judges and contestants' scores, Matthildi and Lefteris were tied with 44 points, Ian and Tania were tied with 33 points and Katerina and Thanasis were tied with 32 points. Papoutsaki, who was the president of the judges for the week, chose to give the final 10 points to Matthildi and the 9 points to Lefteris, the final 8 points to Tania and 7 points to Ian and the 6 points to Katerina and the 5 points to Thanasis. After the combined final scores, two contestants had 18 points. The one who got the highest score from the audience got the highest final place and the one with the lowest got the lowest place.

The Secret Guests of the evening were the members of the boy band One who helped Ian with his transformation and Melina Makri, who transformed into Themis Adamadidis and sang "Ma Pou Na Pao" as an interval act.

#	Contestant	Performing as	Song	Judges and Contestants				Audience	Total	Place	Bonus given to
#	Contestant	Performing as	Song	Judges^{1}	Extra^{2}	Total^{3}	Result^{4}	Audience	Total	Place	Bonus given to
1	Tania	Dua Lipa	"Don't Start Now"	33 (9, 7, 10, 7)	—	33	8	5	13	7	Betty
2	Krateros	Anna Panayiotopoulou	"To Tragoudi Tis Koutsompolas"	30 (7, 7, 8, 8)	—	30	4	8	12	8	Isaias
3	Ian	Constantinos Christoforou of One	"Matia Mou"	33 (8, 9, 9, 7)	—	33	7	11	18	3	Isaias
4	Thanasis	Dimitris Kokotas	"Giati me Tirannas"	32 (9, 8, 7, 8)	—	32	5	9	14	6	Betty
5	Isaias	David Draiman of Disturbed	"The Sound of Silence"	43 (11, 10, 11, 11)	10	53	11	12	23	1	Lefteris
6	Betty	Barry Gibb of Bee Gees	"You Should Be Dancing"	48 (12, 12, 12, 12)	20	68	12	6	18	4	Matthildi
7	Katerina	Christos Avgerinos	"Gia ta Matia tou Kosmou"	32 (8, 8, 7, 9)	—	32	6	4	10	9	Matthildi
8	Lefteris	Thom Yorke of Radiohead	"Exit Music (For a Film)"	39 (10, 11, 9, 9)	5	44	9	10	19	2	Betty
9	Matthildi	Tina Turner	"Proud Mary"	34 (7, 9, 8, 10)	10	44	10	7	17	5	Betty

Notes
1. The points that judges gave in order (Zacharatos, Papoutsaki, Maraveyas, Reppas).
2. Each contestant gave 5 points to a contestant of their choice.
3. Total of both extra and judges' score.
4. Result of both extra and judges' score.

=== Week 6 ===
The sixth episode aired on April 18, 2021, and the winner was Matthildi with 22 points. Matthildi chose to give the money from the audience voting to the organization "Syndesmo Prostasias Paidion & AmEA". The sixth live was to be aired on April 2, 2021, and later on April 11, 2021, but a case of coronavirus was detected among the people of production.

After the judges and contestants' scores, Katerina and Krateros were tied with 30 points. Zacharatos, who was the president of the judges for the week, chose to give the final 7 points to Katerina and the 6 points to Krateros. After the combined final scores, two contestants had 22 points and other three contestants had 14 points. The one who got the highest score from the audience got the highest final place and the one with the lowest got the lowest place.

The Secret Guest of the evening was Dimos Beke, who transformed into Ilias Psinakis and sang "Tora Arhizoun Ta Diskola", "Den Ehi Sidera I Kardia Sou" and "Ola Kala".

Lefteris Eleftheriou didn't participate to the sixth live.

#	Contestant	Performing as	Song	Judges and Contestants				Audience	Total	Place	Bonus given to
#	Contestant	Performing as	Song	Judges^{1}	Extra^{2}	Total^{3}	Result^{4}	Audience	Total	Place	Bonus given to
1	Ian	Bonnie Tyler	"Holding Out for a Hero"	32 (8, 8, 8, 8)	—	32	8	6	14	7	Thanasis
2	Tania	Vasilis Terlegkas	"Oi Strofes"	28 (7, 7, 7, 7)	—	28	5	5	10	8	Thanasis
3	Thanasis	Stromae	"Tous les mêmes"	43 (10, 11, 12, 10)	20	63	12	9	21	3	Matthildi
4	Katerina	Mary Chronopoulou	"Kamaroula Mia Stala"	30 (7, 8, 8, 7)	—	30	7	7	14	6	Betty
5	Isaias	Nomcebo Zikode and Master KG	"Jerusalema"	37 (9, 10, 9, 9)	—	37	9	10	19	4	Betty
6	Krateros	J Balvin	"Mi Gente"	30 (8, 7, 7, 8)	—	30	6	8	14	5	Betty
7	Betty	Sophia Loren	"Mambo Italiano"	42 (11, 9, 10, 12)	15	57	11	11	22	2	Thanasis
8	Matthildi	Alexia	"Ela Mia Nihta"	46 (12, 12, 11, 11)	5	51	10	12	22	1	Thanasis

Notes
1. The points that judges gave in order (Zacharatos, Papoutsaki, Maraveyas, Reppas).
2. Each contestant gave 5 points to a contestant of their choice.
3. Total of both extra and judges' score.
4. Result of both extra and judges' score.

=== Week 7 ===
The seventh episode will be aired on April 25, 2021, and the winner was Krateros with 23 points. Krateros chose to give the money from the audience voting to the organization "ELEPAP".

After the judges and contestants' scores, Katerina and Tania were tied with 36 points. Maravegias, who was the president of the judges for the week, chose to give the final 8 points to Katerina and the 7 points to Tania. After the combined final scores, two contestants had 13 points. The one who got the highest score from the audience got the highest final place and the one with the lowest got the lowest place.

Guest of the night was Yiannis Kapsalis.

#	Contestant	Performing as	Song	Judges and Contestants				Audience	Total	Place	Bonus given to
#	Contestant	Performing as	Song	Judges^{1}	Extra^{2}	Total^{3}	Result^{4}	Audience	Total	Place	Bonus given to
1	Isaias	Lakis Papadopoulos	"Giristroula"	30 (7, 8, 8, 7)	–	30	5	6	11	8	Krateros
2	Tania	Mando	"Stihimatizo"	31 (8, 8, 7, 8)	5	36	7	9	16	5	Krateros
3	Lefteris	Giota Griba	"Karagkouna"	32 (8, 7, 8, 9)	–	32	6	7	13	6	Krateros
4	Matthildi	Boy George of Culture Club	"Karma Chameleon"	28 (7, 7, 7, 7)	–	28	4	4	8	9	Krateros
5	Krateros	Daler Mehndi	"Tunak Tunak Tun"	40 (10, 10, 9, 11)	30	70	12	11	23	1	Ian
6	Katerina	Billy Idol	"Rebel Yell"	36 (9, 9, 9, 9)	–	36	8	5	13	7	Krateros
7	Thanasis	Sarbel	"Se Pira Sovara"	38 (9, 11, 10, 8)	–	38	9	8	17	4	Ian
8	Betty	Zozo Sapountzaki	"Eimai Koritsi Zoriko"	41 (11, 9, 11, 10)	–	41	10	12	22	2	Krateros
9	Ian	Harry Styles	"Sign of the Times"	48 (12, 12, 12, 12)	10	58	11	10	21	3	Tania

Notes
1. The points that judges gave in order (Zacharatos, Papoutsaki, Maraveyas, Reppas).
2. Each contestant gave 5 points to a contestant of their choice.
3. Total of both extra and judges' score.
4. Result of both extra and judges' score.

=== Week 8: Eurovision Night ===
The eighth episode aired on May 9, 2021, and the winner was Betty with 23 points. Betty chose to give the money from the audience voting to the organization "Make a Wish".

After the combined final scores, two contestants had 17 points. The one who got the highest score from the audience got the highest final place and the one with the lowest got the lowest place.

Loukas Giorkas was a guest of the night, to help Lefteris with his performance. Also, Stefania, who will represent Greece in the Eurovision Song Contest 2021, was a guest and she performed live her entry, "Last Dance". Also, during Thanasis' performance, Pashalis Tsarouhas was a guest, who performed as Verka Serduchka and sang "Toy" and Ian, who performed already as Måns Zelmerlöw, sang "Fuego". (Note: For the Eurovision special, Thanasis performed as Eleni Foureira during the interval act of the 2019 Eurovision Song Contest, "Switch Song", where she sang "Dancing Lasha Tumbai" of Verka Serduchka which represented Ukraine in the 2007 Eurovision Song Contest. For his appearance, Ian who already performed as Måns Zelmerlöw, sang "Fuego" and Pashalis Tsarouhas performed as Verka Serduchka and sang "Toy".)

#	Contestant	Performing as	Country	Song	Judges and Contestants				Audience	Total	Place	Bonus given to
#	Contestant	Performing as	Country	Song	Judges^{1}	Extra^{2}	Total^{3}	Result^{4}	Audience	Total	Place	Bonus given to
1	Matthildi	Izhar Cohen	Israel	"A-Ba-Ni-Bi"	31 (8, 7, 7, 9)	–	31	4	4	8	9	Katerina
2	Lefteris	Stereo Mike	Greece	"Watch My Dance"	28 (7, 7, 7, 7)	5	33	6	7	13	7	Thanasis
3	Isaias	Sophia Vossou	Greece	"I Anixi"	38 (11, 8, 8, 11)	–	38	7	10	17	4	Tania
4	Katerina	Hadise	Turkey	"Düm Tek Tek"	36 (7, 9, 10, 10)	10	46	10	6	16	6	Thanasis
5	Ian	Måns Zelmerlöw	Sweden	"Heroes"	39 (9, 11, 11, 8)	5	44	8	9	17	5	Betty
6	Krateros	Martin Lee of Brotherhood of Man	United Kingdom	"Save Your Kisses for Me"	32 (8, 8, 8, 8)	–	32	5	5	10	8	Betty
7	Thanasis	Eleni Foureira	Cyprus	"Dancing Lasha Tumbai"	35 (9, 10, 9, 7)	10	45	9	12	21	2	Katerina
8	Tania	Mahmood	Italy	"Soldi"	42 (12, 12, 9, 9)	5	47	11	8	19	3	Ian
9	Betty	Tamta	Cyprus	"Replay"	43 (10, 9, 12, 12)	10	53	12	11	23	1	Lefteris

Notes
1. The points that judges gave in order (Zacharatos, Papoutsaki, Maraveyas, Reppas).
2. Each contestant gave 5 points to a contestant of their choice.
3. Total of both extra and judges' score.
4. Result of both extra and judges' score.

=== Week 9 ===
The ninth episode will be aired on May 16, 2021.

#	Contestant	Performing as	Song	Judges and Contestants				Audience	Total	Place	Bonus given to
#	Contestant	Performing as	Song	Judges^{1}	Extra^{2}	Total^{3}	Result^{4}	Audience	Total	Place	Bonus given to
7	Isaias	Sylvester	You Make Me Feel				5	8	13	6	
8	Matthildi	Paola Foka	Edo Se Thelo Kardia Mou				7	6	13	8	
4	Lefteris	The Barber of Seville	Figaro Cavatina				10	12	22	2	
2	Thanasis	Kostas Hatzis	Ap'To Aeroplano				8	9	17	4	
9	Tania	Lara Fabian	Je Suis Malade				11	10	21	3	
6	Krateros	Rita Sakellariou	Autos O Erotas Auto T'Agori				4	4	8	9	
5	Katerina	Lady Gaga	Always Remember Us This Way				6	7	13	7	
3	Ian	Quasimodo	Feugo				12	11	23	1	
1	Betty	Elvis Presley	A Little Less Conversation				9	5	14	5	

Notes
1. The points that judges gave in order (Zacharatos, Papoutsaki, Maraveyas, Reppas).
2. Each contestant gave 5 points to a contestant of their choice.
3. Total of both extra and judges' score.
4. Result of both extra and judges' score.

== Results chart ==
Contestant	Week 1	Week 2	Week 3	Week 4	Week 5	Week 6	Week 7	Week 8	Week 9	Week 10	Week 11 Final	Total
Tania	2nd 20 points	4th 16 points	7th 11 points	1st 22 points	7th 13 points	8th 10 points	5th 16 points	3rd 19 points	3rd 21 points	2nd 21 points	1st	169
Ian	3rd 19 points	6th 15 points (Note: Although Ian and Kostas's performance was not shown, Ian still got the points for that night.)	3rd 20 points	4th 18 points	3rd 18 points	7th 12 points	3rd 21 points	5th 17 points	1st 23 points	8th 10 points	2nd	173
Isaias	7th 13 points	8th 12 points	2nd 20 points	3rd 21 points	1st 23 points	4th 19 points	8th 11 points	4th 17 points	6th 13 points	3rd 19 points	3rd	168
Thanasis	6th 13 points	5th 15 points	1st 23 points	5th 17 points	6th 14 points	3rd 21 points	4th 17 points	2nd 21 points	4th 17 points	4th 19 points	4th	177
Betty	10th 10 points	3rd 16 points	6th 11 points	7th 12 points	4th 18 points	2nd 22 points	2nd 22 points	1st 23 points	5th 14 points	9th 9 points	—	157
Matthildi	5th 15 points	7th 13 points	8th 9 points	2nd 21 points	5th 17 points	1st 22 points	9th 8 points	9th 8 points	8th 13 points	1st 23 points	—	149
Katerina	9th 12 points	1st 23 points	4th 18 points	8th 11 points	9th 10 points	6th 12 points	7th 13 points	6th 16 points	7th 13 points	5th 17 points	—	145
Lefteris	4th 16 points	2nd 18 points	9th 8 points	9th 10 points	2nd 19 points	x	6th 13 points	7th 13 points	2nd 22 points	6th 15 points	—	134
Krateros	8th 12 points	9th 7 points	5th 16 points	6th 12 points	8th 12 points	5th 12 points	1st 23 points	8th 10 points	9th 8 points	7th 11 points	—	123
Costas	1st 20 points	Withdrew from the show										20

indicates the contestant came first that week.
indicates the contestant came last that week.
indicates the contestant that withdrew from the show.
indicates the contestant that didn't compete.

== Performances ==
Contestants	Week 1	Week 2	Week 3	Week 4	Week 5	Week 6	Week 7	Week 8	Week 9	Week 10	Week 11 Final
Thanasis	Anna Vissi	Josephine Wendel	Dinos Iliopoulos	Stella Konitopoulou	Dimitris Kokotas	Stromae	Sarbel	Eleni Foureira	Kostas Hatzis	Fred Astaire	
Krateros	Vasilis Papakonstantinou	Vasilis Karras & Konstantina	Stephan Remmler of Trio	Dionysis Savvopoulos	Anna Panayiotopoulou	J Balvin	Daler Mehndi	Martin Lee of Brotherhood of Man	Rita Sakellariou	Marc Anthony	
Lefteris	Constantine Cullen	Thanasis Veggos	Konstantinos Argyros	Sakis Rouvas	Thom Yorke of Radiohead	Jordy	Giota Negka	Stereo Mike	The Barber of Seville	Giorgos Zampetas	
Betty	Lady Miss Kier of Deee-Lite	Antzy Samiou	Bessy Argyraki	Cher	Barry Gibb of Bee Gees	Sophia Loren	Zozo Sapountzaki	Tamta	Elvis Presley	Marilyn Monroe	
Matthildi	Vicky Moscholiou	Lady Gaga	Angela Dimitriou	Rena Vlahopoulou	Tina Turner	Alexia	Boy George	Izhar Cohen	Paola Foka	Sotiria Bellou	
Isaias	The Weeknd	MadClip	Eftichia Fanarioti	Stelios Kazantzidis	David Draiman of Disturbed	Nomcebo Zikode	Lakis Papadopoulos	Sophia Vossou	Sylvester	Leonidas Balafas	
Ian	Robbie Williams	Natassa Theodoridou	Steven Tyler of Aerosmith	Freddie Mercury	Constantinos Christoforou of One	Bonnie Tyler	Harry Styles	Måns Zelmerlöw	Quasimodo	Paulos Sidiopoulos	
Katerina	Shakira	Dimitra Papiou	James Blunt	Dimitra Galani	Christos Avgerinos	Mary Chronopoulou	Billy Idol	Hadise	Lady Gaga	Celine Dion	
Tania	Miley Cyrus	Axl Rose of Guns N' Roses	Bebe Rexha	Tzeni Vanou	Dua Lipa	Vasilis Terlegkas	Mando	Mahmood	Lara Fabian	Andrea Bocelli and Sarah Brightman	
Costas	Despina Vandi	Triantaphillos	Withdrew								

indicates the contestant came first that week.
indicates the contestant came last that week.
indicates the contestant choose Awesome Card on buzzer.
indicates that the contestant's performance was chosen from the audience.
indicates the contestant that didn't compete.

== Ratings ==
Episode		Date	Timeslot (EET)	Ratings	Viewers (in millions)	Rank		Share		Source
Episode		Date	Timeslot (EET)	Ratings	Viewers (in millions)	Daily	Weekly	Household	Adults 18-54	Source
1	Week 1	February 28, 2021	Sunday 9:00pm	10.8%	1.118	#2	#13	24.1%	22.3%	
2	Week 2	March 7, 2021	Sunday 9:00pm	9.5%	0.988	#2	#19	19.6%	15.9%	
3	Week 3	March 14, 2021	Sunday 9:00pm	9.4%	0.970	#2	—N/a	18.7%	15.1%	
4	Week 4	March 21, 2021	Sunday 9:00pm	9.4%	0.973	#2	—N/a	19.8%	18.2%	
5	Week 5	March 28, 2021	Sunday 9:00pm	8.4%	0.869	#2	—N/a	17.7%	14.9%	
6	Week 6	April 18, 2021	Sunday 9:00pm	7.5%	0.774	#3	—N/a	15.0%	12.1%	
7	Week 7	April 25, 2021	Sunday 9:00pm	7.2%	0.741	#3	—N/a	16.9%	12.9%	
8	Week 8	May 9, 2021	Sunday 9:00pm	7.0%	0.723	#3	—N/a	16.9%	13.3%	
9	Week 9	May 16, 2021	Sunday 9:00pm	6.4%	0.659	#3	—N/a	15.5%	12.5%	
10	Week 10	May 23, 2021	Sunday 9:00pm	6.5%	0.671	#2	—N/a	16.8%	12.4%	
11	Week 11	May 30, 2021	Sunday 9:00pm	7.5%	0.780	#3	#19	19.9%	15.1%	
