= Your Face Sounds Familiar (Greek TV series) series 6 =

Your Face Sounds Familiar
- Season 6
- No. of episodes: 6

Release
- Original network: ANT1
- Original release: February 16 – March 22, 2020

Series chronology
- ← Previous; Series 5 Next → Series 7

Your Face Sounds Familiar is a Greek reality show airing on ANT1. The sixth season premiered on February 16, 2020. This season marks the second consecutive season that the show is filmed and not live.

On March 22, 2020, Maria Bekatorou announced on her Instagram that the show will stop airing, because of the coronavirus pandemic in Greece and that she don't know when will they return. On May 14, 2020, Bekatorou announced on the morning show of ANT1, that the season will return in September 2020. In October 2020, it was announced that the show will return in 2021 with new contestants.

== Cast ==
=== Host and judges ===
Maria Bekatorou returned to host the show for the sixth time and the judges are Giorgos Mazonakis, Dimitris Starovas, Alexis Georgoulis and Mirka Papakonstantinou, which replaced Mimi Denisi.

=== Contestants ===
Ten contestants in total competed in the fifth season; five women and five men:

Celebrity	Occupation	Average score	Status
Danae Loukaki	Actress	12.5	Season discontinued due to the COVID-19 pandemic
Evridiki	Singer	16.1	Season discontinued due to the COVID-19 pandemic
Ilias Bogdanos	Singer	16.1	Season discontinued due to the COVID-19 pandemic
Katerina Koukouraki	Singer	13.8	Season discontinued due to the COVID-19 pandemic
Lambis Livieratos	Singer	12.8	Season discontinued due to the COVID-19 pandemic
Maria Androutsou	Actress, singer	12.8	Season discontinued due to the COVID-19 pandemic
Nicolas Raptakis	Singer	17.1	Season discontinued due to the COVID-19 pandemic
Stefanos Mouagkie	Actor	17	Season discontinued due to the COVID-19 pandemic
Tania Breazou	Singer	17.5	Season discontinued due to the COVID-19 pandemic
Yiorgos Hraniotis	Actor, singer	14	Season discontinued due to the COVID-19 pandemic

== Weekly results ==
=== Week 1 ===
The premiere aired on February 16, 2020 and the winner was Tania with 21 points. Tania chose to give the money from the audience voting to the organization "Save A Greek Stray".

After the combined final scores, two contestants had 21 points and other three contestants had 13 points. The one who got the highest score from the audience got the highest final place and the one with the lowest got the lowest place.

#	Contestant	Performing as	Song	Judges and Contestants				Audience	Total	Place	Bonus given to
#	Contestant	Performing as	Song	Judges^{1}	Extra^{2}	Total^{3}	Result^{4}	Audience	Total	Place	Bonus given to
1	Tania	Ariana Grande	"7 Rings"	36 (8, 8, 9, 11)	10	46	10	11	21	1	Ilias
2	Yiorgos	Antonis Kalogiannis	"Do you Like the Greece?"	14 (4, 3, 4, 3)	–	14	3	3	6	10	Stefanos
3	Ilias	Lil Nas X	"Old Town Road"	35 (9, 10, 10, 6)	5	40	8	12	20	3	Tania
4	Evridiki	Cyndi Lauper	"True Colors"	45 (12, 12, 11, 10)	10	55	12	9	21	2	Lambis
5	Danae	Litsa Diamanti	"Terma ta parapona"	23 (7, 6, 5, 5)	5	28	6	7	13	7	Nicolas
6	Stefanos	Eleni Foureira	"El Ritmo Psicodelico"	21 (3, 4, 7, 7)	10	31	7	10	17	4	Tania
7	Lambis	Dean Martin	"That's Amore"	45 (10, 11, 12, 12)	5	50	11	5	16	5	Evridiki
8	Nicolas	Giannis Parios	"Poios na sygkrithei mazi sou"	36 (11, 9, 8, 8)	5	41	9	4	13	8	Danae
9	Maria	Jon Bon Jovi of Bon Jovi	"Runaway"	17 (5, 5, 3, 4)	–	17	4	6	10	9	Evridiki
10	Katerina	Paola Foka	"Thimos"	28 (6, 7, 6, 9)	–	28	5	8	13	6	Stefanos

Notes
1. The points that judges gave in order (Georgoulis, Papakonstantinou, Mazonakis, Starovas).
2. Each contestant gave 5 points to a contestant of their choice.
3. Total of both extra and judges' score.
4. Result of both extra and judges' score.

=== Week 2 ===
The second episode aired on February 23, 2020 and the winner was Maria with 23 points. Maria chose to give the money from the audience voting to the organization "KEEPEA Orizodes".

After the judges and contestants' scores, Maria and Katerina were tied with 40 points and Ilias and Tania were tied with 27 points. Mazonakis, who was the president of the judges for the week, chose to give the final 11 points to Maria and the 10 points to Katerina and chose to give the 9 points to Ilias and the 8 points to Tania. After the combined final scores, two contestants had 15 points, other two contestants had 14 points and other two contestants had 7 points. The one who got the highest score from the audience got the highest final place and the one with the lowest got the lowest place.

Alexis Georgoulis, was missing from this episode because he had a professional job abroad.

#	Contestant	Performing as	Song	Judges and Contestants				Audience	Total	Place	Bonus given to
#	Contestant	Performing as	Song	Judges^{5}	Extra^{6}	Total^{7}	Result^{8}	Audience	Total	Place	Bonus given to
1	Stefanos	Justin Timberlake	"Cry Me a River"	19 (6, 7, 6)	-	19	6	9	15	6	Katerina
2	Nicolas	Ed Sheeran	"Thinking Out Loud"	36 (12, 12, 12)	20	56	12	8	20	2	Tania
3	Lambis	Stratos Dionysiou	"O Taxitzis"	9 (3, 3, 3)	-	9	3	4	7	9	Nicolas
4	Maria	Tones and I	"Dance Monkey"	30 (11, 10, 9)	10	40	11	12	23	1	Danae
5	Ilias	Alkinoos Ioannidis	"O Proskynitis"	27 (8, 11, 8)	-	27	9	5	14	8	Nicolas
6	Yiorgos	Right Said Fred	"I'm Too Sexy"	25 (7, 8, 10)	-	25	7	11	18	3	Katerina
7	Tania	Anna Vissi	"Mavra Gialia"	22 (9, 6, 7)	5	27	8	6	14	7	Nicolas
8	Katerina	Rihanna	"Bitch Better Have My Money"	30 (10, 9, 11)	10	40	10	7	17	4	Nicolas
9	Danae	Angela Dimitriou	"Ftanei"	12 (4, 4, 4)	5	17	5	10	15	5	Maria
10	Evridiki	Alanis Morissette	"You Oughta Know"	15 (5, 5, 5)	-	15	4	3	7	10	Maria

Notes
5. The points that judges gave in order (Papakonstantinou, Mazonakis, Starovas).
6. Each contestant gave 5 points to a contestant of their choice.
7. Total of both extra and judges' score.
8. Result of both extra and judges' score.

=== Week 3 ===
The third episode aired on March 1, 2020 and the winner was Lambis with 23 points. Lambis chose to give the money from the audience voting to the organization "I Kivotos tou Kosmou".

After the combined final scores, two contestants had 19 points and other two contestants had 7 points. The one who got the highest score from the audience got the highest final place and the one with the lowest got the lowest place.

#	Contestant	Performing as	Song	Judges and Contestants				Audience	Total	Place	Bonus given to
#	Contestant	Performing as	Song	Judges^{9}	Extra^{10}	Total^{11}	Result^{12}	Audience	Total	Place	Bonus given to
1	Maria	Alexia	"Ta Koritsia Ksenihtane"	20 (7, 6, 3, 4)	-	20	5	5	10	8	Lambis
2	Ilias	Billie Eilish	"Bad Guy"	35 (6, 8, 11, 10)	-	35	8	12	20	2	Yiorgos
3	Stefanos	Makis Dimakis	"Otan to Anikseis"	22 (4, 5, 8, 5)	-	22	6	9	15	6	Lambis
4	Tania	Christina Aguilera	"Tough Lover"	29 (9, 7, 6, 7)	-	29	7	7	14	7	Lambis
5	Katerina	Aliki Vougiouklaki	"O Lefteris"	19 (3, 3, 7, 6)	-	19	4	3	7	10	Danae
6	Lambis	Barry White	"You're the First, the Last, My Everything"	48 (12, 12, 12, 12)	30	78	12	11	23	1	Yiorgos
7	Nikolas	Sotis Volanis	"Thelo na Do"	41 (11, 11, 10, 9)	-	41	9	10	19	3	Yiorgos
8	Evridiki	Tania Tsanaklidou	"Moires"	16 (5, 4, 4, 3)	-	16	3	4	7	9	Lambis
9	Danae	Army of Lovers	"Crucified"	37 (8, 9, 9, 11)	5	42	10	6	16	5	Lambis
10	Yiorgos	Iggy Pop	"Real Wild Child (Wild One)"	33 (10, 10, 5, 8)	15	48	11	8	19	4	Lambis

Notes
9. The points that judges gave in order (Georgoulis, Papakonstantinou, Mazonakis, Starovas).
10. Each contestant gave 5 points to a contestant of their choice.
11. Total of both extra and judges' score.
12. Result of both extra and judges' score.

=== Week 4 ===
The fourth episode aired on March 8, 2020 and the winner was Evridiki with 24 points. Evridiki chose to give the money from the audience voting to the organization "PASYKAF".

After the judges and contestants' scores, Nikolas and Stefanos were tied with 37 points. Georgoulis, who was the president of the judges for the week, chose to give the final 9 points to Stefanos and the 8 points to Nikolas. After the combined final scores, two contestants had 20 points. The one who got the highest score from the audience got the highest final place and the one with the lowest got the lowest place.

#	Contestant	Performing as	Song	Judges and Contestants				Audience	Total	Place	Bonus given to
#	Contestant	Performing as	Song	Judges^{13}	Extra^{14}	Total^{15}	Result^{16}	Audience	Total	Place	Bonus given to
1	Stefanos	Bobby Brown	"My Prerogative"	32 (6, 11, 8, 7)	5	37	9	11	20	2	Maria
2	Evridiki	Babymetal	"Gimme Chocolate!!"	48 (12, 12, 12, 12)	5	53	12	12	24	1	Nikolas
3	Tania	Melisses	"To Kyma"	31 (8, 5, 7, 11)	5	36	7	7	14	6	Yiorgos
4	Yiorgos	Martha Karagianni	"O Antras pou tha Pantrefto"	16 (7, 3, 3, 3)	10	26	5	8	13	7	Ilias
5	Nikolas	Mariah Carey	"All I Want for Christmas Is You"	27 (4, 6, 9, 9)	10	37	8	3	11	8	Evridiki
6	Lambis	FY	"Den me Theloun"	19 (3, 4, 6, 5)	-	19	3	4	7	10	Tania
7	Maria	The Cranberries	"Zombie"	24 (9, 7, 4, 4)	5	29	6	9	15	5	Nikolas
8	Katerina	Jessie J	"Do It like a Dude"	40 (10, 9, 11, 10)	5	45	11	6	17	4	Yiorgos
9	Danae	Natassa Bofiliou	"Krypsou"	24 (5, 8, 5, 6)	-	24	4	5	9	9	Katerina
10	Ilias	Red Hot Chili Peppers	"Give It Away"	39 (11, 10, 10, 8)	5	44	10	10	20	3	Stefanos

Notes
13. The points that judges gave in order (Georgoulis, Papakonstantinou, Mazonakis, Starovas).
14. Each contestant gave 5 points to a contestant of their choice.
15. Total of both extra and judges' score.
16. Result of both extra and judges' score.

=== Week 5 ===
The fifth episode aired on March 15, 2020 and the winner was Katerina with 23 points. Evridiki chose to give the money from the audience voting to the organization "Kentro Vrefon Mitera".

After the judges and contestants' scores, Ilias and Yiorgos were tied with 34 points. Georgoulis, who was the president of the judges for the week, chose to give the final 7 points to Ilias and the 6 points to Yiorgos. After the combined final scores, two contestants had 20 points and other twocontestants had 9 points. The one who got the highest score from the audience got the highest final place and the one with the lowest got the lowest place.

#	Contestant	Performing as	Song	Judges and Contestants				Audience	Total	Place	Bonus given to
#	Contestant	Performing as	Song	Judges^{17}	Extra^{18}	Total^{19}	Result^{20}	Audience	Total	Place	Bonus given to
1	Lambis	Elvis Presley	"Viva Las Vegas"	13 (4, 3, 3, 3)	-	13	3	3	6	10	Danae
2	Tania	Camila Cabello	"Señorita"	31 (5, 7, 9, 10)	10	41	9	11	20	3	Ilias
3	Ilias	Shawn Mendes	"Señorita"	29 (6, 6, 8, 9)	5	34	7	7	14	6	Tania
4	Danae	Sofia Filippidou	"Tou Gamou (Aitos kai Peristera)"	17 (3, 4, 6, 4)	10	27	5	4	9	9	Evridiki
5	Nikolas	Hozier	"Take Me to Church"	36 (12, 12, 7, 5)	-	36	8	8	16	5	Katerina
6	Katerina	Ariel	"Part of Your World"	42 (11, 9, 10, 12)	5	47	11	12	23	1	Stefanos
7	Yiorgos	Joe Cocker	"You Can Leave Your Hat On"	29 (8, 8, 5, 8)	5	34	6	6	12	7	Tania
8	Stefanos	Pikotaro	"PPAP (Pen-Pineapple-Apple-Pen)"	38 (10, 10, 12, 6)	5	43	10	10	20	4	Evridiki
9	Maria	Eleonora Zouganeli	"Ela"	23 (7, 5, 4, 7)	-	23	4	5	9	8	Yiorgos
10	Evridiki	Jacques Brel	"Amsterdam"	42 (9, 11, 11, 11)	10	52	12	9	21	2	Danae

Notes
17. The points that judges gave in order (Georgoulis, Papakonstantinou, Mazonakis, Starovas).
18. Each contestant gave 5 points to a contestant of their choice.
19. Total of both extra and judges' score.
20. Result of both extra and judges' score.

=== Week 6 ===
The sixth episode aired on March 22, 2020 and the winner was Nikolas with 24 points. Nikolas chose to give the money from the audience voting to the organization "Sophia Foundation". The episode was filmed, for the first time, without audience due to the COVID-19 pandemic. The audience vote was replaced by the president of the judges' vote.

After the judges and contestants' scores, Ilias, Maria and Yiorgos were tied with 20 points. Papakonstantinou, who was the president of the judges for the week, chose to give the final 6 points to Yiorgos, the 5 points to Ilias and the 4 points to Maria.

#	Contestant	Performing as	Song	Judges and Contestants				President	Total	Place	Bonus given to
#	Contestant	Performing as	Song	Judges^{21}	Extra^{22}	Total^{23}	Result^{24}	President	Total	Place	Bonus given to
1	Maria	Britney Spears	"...Baby One More Time"	20 (4, 8, 8)	-	20	4	6	10	8	Evridiki
2	Ilias	Konstantinos Argyros	"Ti na to Kano/ Mazi sou"	20 (8, 5, 7)	-	20	5	4	9	9	Evridiki
3	Stefanos	Lionel Richie	"Hello"	18 (7, 7, 4)	5	23	7	8	15	6	Nikolas
4	Nikolas	Lena Zevgara	"Ela Ela"	34 (11, 12, 11)	15	49	12	12	24	1	Danae
5	Evridiki	Madonna	"Hung Up"	24 (6, 9, 9)	15	39	10	7	17	4	Tania
6	Tania	Tzeni Vanou	"I Sklava"	35 (11, 11, 12)	5	40	11	11	22	2	Evridiki
7	Lambis	Dalida	"Itsy Bitsy, Petit Bikini"	30 (10, 10, 10)	-	30	9	9	18	3	Stefanos
8	Katerina	Michalis Violaris	"Ta Rialia"	9 (3, 3, 3)	-	9	3	3	6	10	Nikolas
9	Danae	Bessy Argyraki	"Mes' stin Prosefchi mou"	15 (5, 4, 6)	10	25	8	5	13	7	Nikolas
10	Yiorgos	Michalis Rakintzis	"Dikos sou gia Panta"	20 (9, 6, 5)	-	20	6	10	16	5	Danae

Notes
21. The points that judges gave in order (Georgoulis, Mazonakis, Starovas).
22. Each contestant gave 5 points to a contestant of their choice.
23. Total of both extra and judges' score.
24. Result of both extra and judges' score.

== Results chart ==
Contestant	Week 1	Week 2	Week 3	Week 4	Week 5	Week 6	Week 7	Total
Danae	7th 13 points	5th 15 points	5th 16 points	9th 9 points	9th 9 points	7th 13 points	Show discontinued	75
Evridiki	2nd 21 points	10th 7 points	9th 7 points	1st 24 points	2nd 21 points	4th 17 points	Show discontinued	97
Ilias	3rd 20 points	8th 14 points	2nd 20 points	3rd 20 points	6th 14 points	9th 9 points	Show discontinued	97
Katerina	6th 13 points	4th 17 points	10th 7 points	4th 17 points	1st 23 points	10th 6 points	Show discontinued	83
Lambis	5th 16 points	9th 7 points	1st 23 points	10th 7 points	10th 6 points	3rd 18 points	Show discontinued	77
Maria	9th 10 points	1st 23 points	8th 10 points	5th 15 points	8th 9 points	8th 10 points	Show discontinued	77
Nicolas	8th 13 points	2nd 20 points	3rd 19 points	8th 11 points	5th 16 points	1st 24 points	Show discontinued	103
Stefanos	4th 17 points	6th 15 points	6th 15 points	2nd 20 points	4th 20 points	6th 15 points	Show discontinued	102
Tania	1st 21 points	7th 14 points	7th 14 points	6th 14 points	3rd 20 points	2nd 22 points	Show discontinued	105
Yiorgos	10th 6 points	3rd 18 points	4th 19 points	7th 13 points	7th 12 points	5th 16 points	Show discontinued	84

indicates the contestant came first that week.
indicates the contestant came last that week.

== Performances ==
Contestants	Week 1	Week 2	Week 3	Week 4	Week 5	Week 6	Week 7
Danae	Litsa Diamanti	Angela Dimitriou	Army of Lovers	Natassa Bofiliou	Sofia Filippidou	Bessy Argyraki	Sakis Rouvas
Evridiki	Cyndi Lauper	Alanis Morissette	Tania Tsanaklidou	Babymetal	Jacques Brel	Madonna	Björk
Ilias	Lil Nas X	Alkinoos Ioannidis	Billie Eilish	Red Hot Chili Peppers	Shawn Mendes	Konstantinos Argyros	J Balvin
Katerina	Paola Foka	Rihanna	Aliki Vougiouklaki	Jessie J	Ariel	Michalis Violaris	Bebe Rexha
Lambis	Dean Martin	Stratos Dionysiou	Barry White	FY	Elvis Presley	Dalida	Giannis Poulopoulos
Maria	Jon Bon Jovi of Bon Jovi	Tones and I	Alexia	The Cranberries	Eleonora Zouganeli	Britney Spears	Katerina Stanisi
Nicolas	Giannis Parios	Ed Sheeran	Sotis Volanis	Mariah Carey	Hozier	Lena Zevgara	George Michael
Stefanos	Eleni Foureira	Justin Timberlake	Makis Dimakis	Bobby Brown	Pikotaro	Lionel Richie	Panos Mouzourakis
Tania	Ariana Grande	Anna Vissi	Christina Aguilera	Melisses	Camila Cabello	Tzeni Vanou	Guns N' Roses
Yiorgos	Antonis Kalogiannis	Right Said Fred	Iggy Pop	Martha Karagianni	Joe Cocker	Michalis Rakintzis	Leonard Cohen

indicates the contestant came first that week.
indicates the contestant came last that week.
show discontinued

== Ratings ==
Episode		Date	Ratings (total)	Ratings (ages 18–54)	Source
1	Week 1	February 16, 2020	29.2%	28.4%	
2	Week 2	February 23, 2020	25.6%	23.5%	
3	Week 3	March 1, 2020	23.8%	22.7%	
4	Week 4	March 8, 2020	25.1%	22.2%	
5	Week 5	March 15, 2020	23.2%	22.1%	
6	Week 6	March 22, 2020	22.0%	18.4%	
