= Your Face Sounds Familiar (Greek TV series) series 5 =

Your Face Sounds Familiar
- Season 5
- Winner: Ian Stratis

Release
- Original network: ANT1
- Original release: January 27 – March 24, 2019

Series chronology
- ← Previous; Series 4 Next → Series 6

Your Face Sounds Familiar is a Greek reality show airing on ANT1. The fifth season premiered on January 27, 2019. This season marks the first season that the show is filmed and not live.

== Cast ==
=== Host and judges ===
Maria Bekatorou returned to host the show for the fifth time and the new four judges are Giorgos Mazonakis, Dimitris Starovas, Alexis Georgoulis and Mimi Denisi.

=== Contestants ===
Ten contestants in total competed in the fifth season; five women and five men:

Celebrity	Occupation	Average score	Status
Ian Stratis	Singer	18.3	Winner
Katerina Stikoudi	Model, Singer	17.4	Runner-up
Melina Makri	Singer	15.1	Third place
Argiris Aggelou	Actor	16.0	Fourth place
Eva Tsachra	Singer	15.0	—N/a
Vaggelis Panagopoulos	Singer	14.6	—N/a
Eleni Filini	Actor	14.07	—N/a
Chrispa	Singer	13.9	—N/a
Pashalis Tsarouhas	Actor	13.0	—N/a
Eythimis Zisakis	Actor	13.0	—N/a

== Weekly results ==
=== Week 1 ===
The premiere aired on January 27, 2019 and the winner was Argiris with 22 points. Argiris chose to give the money from the audience voting to the organization "Aspres Petaloudes".

After the judges and contestants' scores, Chrispa and Melina were tied with 24 points. Mazonakis, who was the president of the judges for the week, chose to give the final 6 points to Chrispa and the 5 points to Melina. After the combined final scores, three contestants had 13 point. The one who got the highest score from the audience got the highest final place and the one with the lowest got the lowest place.

#	Contestant	Performing as	Song	Judges and Contestants				Audience	Total	Place
#	Contestant	Performing as	Song	Judges^{1}	Extra^{2}	Total^{3}	Result^{4}	Audience	Total	Place
1	Chrispa	Cardi B	"I Like It"	20 (6,6,4,4)	5	25	6	8	14	5
2	Melina	Evridiki	"To Mono pou Thimamai"	25 (7, 5, 6, 7)	–	25	5	4	9	10
3	Katerina	Paola	"As' Tin na Leei"	22 (4, 4, 5, 9)	–	22	4	9	13	7
4	Argiris	Ed Sheeran	"Perfect"	47 (12, 12, 12, 11)	5	52	11	11	22	1
5	Pashalis	Giorgos Margaritis	"Dromoi tou Pouthena"	29 (8, 8, 8, 5)	–	29	7	3	10	9
6	Ian	Katy Perry	"Swish Swish"	36 (5, 11, 10, 10)	–	36	9	12	21	2
7	Eythimis	Sakis Rouvas	"Ela Mou"	12 (3, 3, 3, 3)	5	17	3	10	13	6
8	Eva	Sam Smith	"Writing's on the Wall"	41 (11, 9, 9, 12)	25	66	12	7	19	3
9	Eleni	Sperantza Vrana	"Mambo Brazilero"	30 (10, 7, 7, 6)	5	35	8	5	13	8
10	Vaggelis	R.E.M.	"The One I Love"	38 (9, 10, 11, 8)	5	43	10	6	16	4

=== Week 2 ===
The second episode aired on February 3, 2019 and the winner Katerina with 22 points. Katerina chose to give the money from the audience voting to the organization "Faros Zois".

After the judges and contestants' scores, Eleni and Eva were tied with 30 points. Denisi, who was the president of the judges for the week, chose to give the final 7 points to Eleni and the 6 points to Eva. After the combined final scores, two contestants had 16 points and other two contestants had 15 points. The one who got the highest score from the audience got the highest final place and the one with the lowest got the lowest place.

#	Contestant	Performing as	Song	Judges and Contestants				Audience	Total	Place
#	Contestant	Performing as	Song	Judges^{1}	Extra^{2}	Total^{3}	Result^{4}	Audience	Total	Place
1	Eva	Camila Cabello	"Havana"	30 (11, 5, 6, 8)	–	30	6	10	16	3
2	Vaggelis	Stelios Kazantzidis	"Zigouala"	30 (7, 11, 5, 7)	10	40	10	3	13	7
3	Katerina	Dimitra Galani	"Dyo Meres Mono"	47 (12, 12, 12, 11)	30	77	12	12	24	1
4	Pashalis	John Tikis	"Pos Pernoun Ta Hronia"	29 (10, 7, 7, 5)	–	29	5	4	9	9
5	Melina	Christina Aguilera	"Candyman"	31 (6, 6, 9, 10)	–	31	8	7	15	5
6	Ian	Freddie Mercury of Queen	"Bohemian Rhapsody / Don't Stop Me Now"	42 (9, 10, 11, 12)	–	42	11	11	22	2
7	Eleni	Tony Sfinos	"Genghis Khan / Ksafnika me Agapas"	30 (5, 9, 10, 6)	–	30	7	9	16	4
8	Eythimis	Lefteris Pantazis	"Breathless"	29 (4, 8, 8, 9)	10	39	9	6	15	6
9	Argiris	Christos Thivaios	"Den Eimai Allos"	19 (8, 4, 4, 3)	–	19	4	8	12	8
10	Chrispa	Katy Garbi	"To Kati"	13 (3, 3, 3, 4)	–	13	3	5	8	10

Notes
1. The points that judges gave in order (Georgoulis, Mazonakis, Denisi, Starovas).
2. Each contestant gave 5 points to a contestant of their choice.
3. Total of both extra and judges' score.
4. Result of both extra and judges' score.
5. In the final, only the audience voted for the winner and the one with the most votes won the competition.

=== Week 3 ===
The third episode aired on February 10, 2019 and the winner was Eva with 23 points. Eva chose to give the money from the audience voting to the organization "Save Animal Greece".

After the combined final scores, two contestants had 19 points and other two contestants had 10 points. The one who got the highest score from the audience got the highest final place and the one with the lowest got the lowest place.

#	Contestant	Performing as	Song	Judges and Contestants				Audience	Total	Place
#	Contestant	Performing as	Song	Judges^{1}	Extra^{2}	Total^{3}	Result^{4}	Audience	Total	Place
1	Vaggelis	Drake	"In My Feelings"	40 (12, 11, 9, 8)	5	45	10	12	22	2
2	Ian	Nikos Oikonomopoulos	"Ennoeitai / Doro Gia Sena"	17 (4, 5, 4, 4)	–	17	4	6	10	7
3	Chrispa	Stefanos Korkolis	"Skoni kai Thripsala"	26 (5, 6, 6, 9)	5	31	7	3	10	8
4	Melina	Anna Vissi feat. Nikos Karvelas	"Daimones"	35 (8, 9, 11, 7)	5	40	9	10	19	3
5	Pashalis	Anna Vissi feat. Nikos Karvelas	"Daimones"	29 (9, 7, 7, 6)	–	29	6	9	15	5
6	Eva	Maria Callas	"Habanera"	46 (10, 12, 12, 12)	20	66	12	11	23	1
7	Eythimis	Panos Mouzourakis	"To Palio Mou Palto"	20 (6, 4, 5, 5)	–	20	5	4	9	9
8	Katerina	Cher	"If I Could Turn Back Time"	35 (7, 10, 8, 10)	–	35	8	7	15	6
9	Eleni	Vicky Moscholiou	"Aliti"	12 (3, 3, 3, 3)	–	12	3	5	8	10
10	Argiris	Cher	"Welcome to Burlesque"	40 (11, 8, 10, 11)	15	55	11	8	19	4

Notes
1. The points that judges gave in order (Georgoulis, Mazonakis, Denisi, Starovas).
2. Each contestant gave 5 points to a contestant of their choice.
3. Total of both extra and judges' score.
4. Result of both extra and judges' score.
5. In the final, only the audience voted for the winner and the one with the most votes won the competition.

=== Week 4 ===
The fourth episode aired on February 17, 2019 and the winner was Pashalis with 24 points. Pashalis chose to give the money from the audience voting to the organization "Anadysi".

After the combined final scores, two contestants had 17 points. The one who got the highest score from the audience got the highest final place and the one with the lowest got the lowest place.

#	Contestant	Performing as	Song	Judges and Contestants				Audience	Total	Place
#	Contestant	Performing as	Song	Judges^{1}	Extra^{2}	Total^{3}	Result^{4}	Audience	Total	Place
1	Melina	Dua Lipa	"New Rules"	23 (5, 5, 6, 7)	–	23	6	4	10	9
2	Eva	Beyoncé	"Run the World (Girls)"	41 (12, 9, 9, 11)	5	46	10	7	17	5
3	Eleni	Rena Morfi a.k.a. Souli Anatoli	"Otan Sou Horevo"	21 (4, 6, 5, 6)	–	21	5	6	11	8
4	Pashalis	The Prodigy	"Firestarter"	44 (10, 12, 12, 10)	20	64	12	12	24	1
5	Ian	Justin Timberlake	"SexyBack"	19 (6, 4, 4, 5)	–	19	4	10	14	6
6	Eythimis	Tolis Voskopoulos	"Den Me Noiazei"	12 (3, 3, 3, 3)	–	12	3	3	6	10
7	Katerina	Vanilla Ice	"Ice Ice Baby"	40 (11, 10, 10, 9)	5	45	9	11	20	2
8	Argiris	Damien Rice	"The Blower's Daughter"	31 (9, 7, 7, 8)	–	31	8	9	17	4
9	Vaggelis	Giorgos Mazonakis	"Mou Leipeis"	28 (8, 8, 8, 4)	–	28	7	5	12	7
10	Chrispa	Jessica Rabbit	"Why Don't You Do Right?"	41 (7, 11, 11, 12)	20	61	11	8	19	3

Notes
1. The points that judges gave in order (Georgoulis, Mazonakis, Denisi, Starovas).
2. Each contestant gave 5 points to a contestant of their choice.
3. Total of both extra and judges' score.
4. Result of both extra and judges' score.
5. In the final, only the audience voted for the winner and the one with the most votes won the competition.

=== Week 5 ===
The fifth episode aired on February 24, 2019 and the winner was Melina with 24 points. Melina chose to give the money from the audience voting to the organization "Save a Greek Stray".

After the judges and contestants' scores, Argiris and Eva were tied with 20 points. Mazonakis, who was the president of the judges for the week, chose to give the final 5 points to Argiris and the 4 points to Eva.

#	Contestant	Performing as	Song	Judges and Contestants				Audience	Total	Place
#	Contestant	Performing as	Song	Judges^{1}	Extra^{2}	Total^{3}	Result^{4}	Audience	Total	Place
1	Argiris	Giannis Vogiatzis	"Sou to Pa Mia kai Dyo kai Treis"	20 (3, 6, 6, 5)	–	20	5	8	13	7
2	Eythimis	Snik	"Dab"	38 (8, 11, 10, 9)	–	38	9	9	18	3
3	Melina	Melina Aslanidou	"Tetarti Vrady / Ti Sou Kana kai Pineis / To Lathos"	48 (12, 12, 12, 12)	35	83	12	12	24	1
4	Katerina	Aliki Vougiouklaki	"I Kyriaki / Einai to Stroma Mou Mono"	25 (7, 5, 5, 8)	–	25	6	11	17	4
5	Eleni	Raffaella Carrà	"A far l'amore comincia tu"	30 (9, 8, 7, 6)	5	35	8	7	15	6
6	Vaggelis	Bono of U2	"With or Without You"	28 (6, 7, 8, 7)	–	28	7	4	11	8
7	Ian	Kalomira	"Paizeis?"	41 (10, 10, 11, 10)	5	46	11	10	21	2
8	Pashalis	Grigoris Bithikotsis	"Vrehei stin Ftohogeitonia"	40 (11, 9, 9, 11)	–	40	10	6	16	5
9	Eva	David Bowie	"Let's Dance"	15 (4, 4, 3, 4)	5	20	4	3	7	10
10	Chrispa	Vasilis Karras	"Apo ton Vorra Mehri ton Noto"	15 (5, 3, 4, 3)	–	15	3	5	8	9

Notes
1. The points that judges gave in order (Georgoulis, Mazonakis, Denisi, Starovas).
2. Each contestant gave 5 points to a contestant of their choice.
3. Total of both extra and judges' score.
4. Result of both extra and judges' score.
5. In the final, only the audience voted for the winner and the one with the most votes won the competition.

=== Week 6 ===
The sixth episode aired on March 3, 2019 and the winner was Ian with 24 points. Ian chose to give the money from the audience voting to the organization "Skytali".

After the judges and contestants' scores, Argiris and Melina were tied with 20 points. Denisi, who was the president of the judges for the week, chose to give the final 10 points to Melina and the 9 points to Argiris. After the combined final scores, two contestants had 19 points. The one who got the highest score from the audience got the highest final place and the one with the lowest got the lowest place.

#	Contestant	Performing as	Song	Judges and Contestants				Audience	Total	Place
#	Contestant	Performing as	Song	Judges^{1}	Extra^{2}	Total^{3}	Result^{4}	Audience	Total	Place
1	Eleni	Kostis Maraveyas	"Den Zitao Polla"	31 (8, 8, 8, 7)	–	31	8	7	15	6
2	Vaggelis	Imagine Dragons	"Thunder"	27 (7, 6, 6, 8)	–	27	6	11	17	4
3	Melina	Themis Adamadidis	"Stin Kardia"	37 (5, 10, 10, 12)	–	37	10	4	14	7
4	Pashalis	Pyramidos	"Ta Kagkelia"	14 (3, 3, 3, 5)	–	14	3	5	8	9
5	Katerina	Maria Farantouri	"Bella ciao"	29 (9, 7, 7, 6)	–	29	7	9	16	5
6	Argiris	Elsa	"Let It Go"	37 (10, 9, 9, 9)	–	37	9	10	19	2
7	Ian	Led Zeppelin	"Whole Lotta Love"	46 (12, 11, 12, 11)	40	86	12	12	24	1
8	Eva	Alkistis Protopsalti	"Trava Skandali"	17 (6, 4, 4, 3)	–	17	4	3	7	10
9	Eythimis	Luis Fonsi	"Despacito"	18 (4, 5, 5, 4)	5	23	5	6	11	8
10	Chrispa	Adele	"Someone like You"	44 (11, 12, 11, 10)	5	49	11	8	19	3

Notes
1. The points that judges gave in order (Georgoulis, Mazonakis, Denisi, Starovas).
2. Each contestant gave 5 points to a contestant of their choice.
3. Total of both extra and judges' score.
4. Result of both extra and judges' score.
5. In the final, only the audience voted for the winner and the one with the most votes won the competition.

=== Week 7 ===
The seventh episode aired on March 10, 2019 and the winner was Ian with 22 points. Ian chose to give the money from the audience voting to the organization "Skytali".

After the judges and contestants' scores, Argiris and Eleni were tied with 20 points. Starovas, who was the president of the judges for the week, chose to give the final 10 points to Eleni and the 9 points to Argiris. After the combined final scores, two contestants had 20 points and other two contestants had 8 points. The one who got the highest score from the audience got the highest final place and the one with the lowest got the lowest place.

#	Contestant	Performing as	Song	Judges and Contestants				Audience	Total	Place
#	Contestant	Performing as	Song	Judges^{1}	Extra^{2}	Total^{3}	Result^{4}	Audience	Total	Place
1	Melina	Jennifer Lopez	"On the Floor"	23 (4, 6, 6, 7)	–	23	5	3	8	10
2	Vaggelis	Pharrell Williams	"Happy"	17 (5, 4, 4, 4)	–	17	4	7	11	8
3	Eythimis	Stratos Dionysiou	"Me Skotose Giati Tin Agapousa"	41 (9, 11, 11, 10)	10	51	11	8	19	4
4	Chrispa	Madonna	"Vogue"	24 (6, 5, 5, 8)	–	24	6	9	15	5
5	Ian	Prince	"Purple Rain"	47 (12, 12, 12, 11)	5	52	12	10	22	1
6	Katerina	Nicki Minaj	"Anaconda"	32 (8, 8, 7, 9)	5	37	8	12	20	2
7	Argiris	Giannis Parios	"Ena Gramma"	34 (11, 7, 10, 6)	15	49	9	11	20	3
8	Eleni	Zozo Sapountzaki	"Panagia Mou Ena Paidi"	34 (10, 10, 9, 5)	15	49	10	4	14	6
9	Eva	Panos Kiamos	"Thelo Na Se Ksanado"	12 (3, 3, 3, 3)	–	12	3	5	8	9
10	Pashalis	Tania Tsanaklidou	"Mama Gernao"	36 (7, 9, 8, 12)	–	36	7	6	13	7

Notes
1. The points that judges gave in order (Georgoulis, Mazonakis, Denisi, Starovas).
2. Each contestant gave 5 points to a contestant of their choice.
3. Total of both extra and judges' score.
4. Result of both extra and judges' score.
5. In the final, only the audience voted for the winner and the one with the most votes won the competition.

=== Week 8 ===
The eighth episode aired on March 17, 2019 and the winner was Katerina with 23 points. Katerina chose to give the money from the audience voting to the organization "Faros Zois".

After the combined final scores, two contestants had 23 points and other two contestants had 16 points. The one who got the highest score from the audience got the highest final place and the one with the lowest got the lowest place.

#	Contestant	Performing as	Song	Judges and Contestants				Audience	Total	Place
#	Contestant	Performing as	Song	Judges^{1}	Extra^{2}	Total^{3}	Result^{4}	Audience	Total	Place
1	Chrispa	Marinella	"Ego Ki Esy"	30 (5, 10, 9, 6)	5	35	9	7	16	5
2	Eva	Jessie J	"Bang Bang"	30 (7, 6, 7, 10)	–	30	7	9	16	4
3	Melina	Angela Dimitriou	"Comeback"	31 (11, 4, 8, 8)	–	31	8	5	13	7
4	Ian	The Weeknd	"Starboy"	29 (8, 8, 6, 7)	–	29	6	8	14	6
5	Vaggelis	Polina	"To Roz Bikini"	12 (3, 3, 3, 3)	–	12	3	3	6	10
6	Eleni	Grace Jones	"I've Seen That Face Before (Libertango)"	47 (12, 12, 12, 11)	25	72	12	11	23	2
7	Katerina	Alice Cooper	"Poison"	44 (10, 11, 11, 12)	10	54	11	12	23	1
8	Pashalis	Locomondo	"Den Kanei Kryo Stin Ellada"	20 (6, 5, 5, 4)	–	20	4	6	10	8
9	Eythimis	Les Chakachas	"Les Enfants du Pirée"	22 (4, 9, 4, 5)	5	27	5	4	9	9
10	Argiris	Gene Kelly	"Singin' in the Rain"	35 (9, 7, 10, 9)	5	40	10	10	20	3

Notes
1. The points that judges gave in order (Georgoulis, Mazonakis, Denisi, Starovas).
2. Each contestant gave 5 points to a contestant of their choice.
3. Total of both extra and judges' score.
4. Result of both extra and judges' score.
5. In the final, only the audience voted for the winner and the one with the most votes won the competition.

=== Week 9 ===
The ninth episode aired on March 24, 2019 and the winner was Eythimis with 24 points. Eythimis chose to give the money from the audience voting to the organization "Keepea- Orizontes".

After the judges and contestants' scores, Argiris and Melina were tied with 21 points. Starovas, who was the president of the judges for the week, chose to give the final 6 points to Argiris and the 5 points to Melina. After the combined final scores, two contestants had 10 points. The one who got the highest score from the audience got the highest final place and the one with the lowest got the lowest place.

Betty Maggira was the guest judge of the evening due to Denisi's planned trip.

#	Contestant	Performing as	Song	Judges and Contestants				Audience	Total	Place
#	Contestant	Performing as	Song	Judges^{1}	Extra^{2}	Total^{3}	Result^{4}	Audience	Total	Place
1	Pashalis	Johnny Cash	"Ring of Fire"	17 (3, 5, 6, 3)	-	17	4	4	8	10
2	Eva	Natassa Theodoridou	"As'ta Ola Ki Ela"	15 (4, 3, 3, 5)	–	15	3	6	9	9
3	Eleni	Rena Vlahopoulou	"Kokoriko"	32 (8, 9, 8, 7)	–	32	8	8	16	5
4	Vaggelis	The Cure	"Lovesong"	27 (7, 7, 7, 6)	–	27	7	3	10	8
5	Chrispa	Mary Poppins	"Supercalifragilisticexpialidocious"	41 (9, 11, 10, 11)	15	56	11	7	18	4
6	Ian	Teris Chrisos	"Oneira"	41 (11, 10, 11, 9)	-	41	10	11	21	2
7	Katerina	Eleonora Zouganeli	"Ta Leme"	37 (10, 8, 9, 10)	-	37	9	10	19	3
8	Melina	Evanescence	"Bring Me to Life"	21 (6, 6, 5, 4)	–	21	5	5	10	7
9	Eythimis	Vasilis Papakonstantinou	"Na Koimithoume Agkalia"	48 (12, 12, 12, 12)	35	83	12	12	24	1
10	Argiris	Britney Spears	"Oops!... I Did It Again"	21 (5, 4, 4, 8)	-	21	6	9	15	6

Notes
1. The points that judges gave in order (Georgoulis, Mazonakis, Denisi, Starovas).
2. Each contestant gave 5 points to a contestant of their choice.
3. Total of both extra and judges' score.
4. Result of both extra and judges' score.
5. In the final, only the audience voted for the winner and the one with the most votes won the competition.

=== Week 10 ===
The tenth episode aired on March 31, 2019 and the winner was Pashalis with 23 points. Pashalis chose to give the money from the audience voting to the organization "Anadysi".

After the judges and contestants' scores, Argiris, Chrispa and Katerina were tied with 19 points. Denisi, who was the president of the judges for the week, chose to give the final 5 points to Katerina, the 4 points to Argiris and the 3 points to Chrispa. After the combined final scores, two contestants had 15 points. The one who got the highest score from the audience got the highest final place and the one with the lowest got the lowest place.

#	Contestant	Performing as	Song	Judges and Contestants				Audience	Total	Place
#	Contestant	Performing as	Song	Judges^{1}	Extra^{2}	Total^{3}	Result^{4}	Audience	Total	Place
1	Argiris	Dakis	"Tosa Kalokairia"	19 (5, 4, 4, 6)	-	19	4	3	7	10
2	Ian	Eminem	"Lose Yourself"	23 (3, 7, 6, 7)	–	23	6	9	15	4
3	Chrispa	Eurythmics	"Sweet Dreams (Are Made of This)"	19 (4, 3, 3, 9)	–	19	3	7	10	9
4	Melina	Efi Thodi	"Mpikan ta Gidia sto Mantri"	34 (7, 10, 9, 8)	–	34	8	4	12	7
5	Vaggelis	AC/DC	"Stayin' Alive" (by Bee Gees) & "Back in Black"	38 (9, 9, 10, 10)	35	73	12	10	22	2
6	Pashalis	Dionysis Savvopoulos	"San ton Karagiozi"	48 (12, 12, 12, 12)	10	58	11	12	23	1
7	Eva	Grizabella- Cats	"Memory"	44 (11, 11, 11, 11)	-	44	10	11	21	3
8	Eythimis	Manolis Kontaros	"Arhizo kai Trelainomai"	25 (8, 6, 7, 4)	–	25	7	8	15	5
9	Katerina	Modern Talking	"You're My Heart, You're My Soul"	19 (6, 5, 5, 3)	-	19	5	6	11	8
10	Eleni	Rita Sakellariou	"Aftos o Anthropos"	31 (10, 8, 8, 5)	5	36	9	5	14	6

Notes
1. The points that judges gave in order (Georgoulis, Mazonakis, Denisi, Starovas).
2. Each contestant gave 5 points to a contestant of their choice.
3. Total of both extra and judges' score.
4. Result of both extra and judges' score.
5. In the final, only the audience voted for the winner and the one with the most votes won the competition.

=== Week 11: Eurovision Night ===
The eleventh episode aired on April 7, 2019 and the winner was Katerina with 23 points. Katerina chose to give the money from the audience voting to the organization "Faros Zois".

After the combined final scores, three contestants had 8 points. The one who got the highest score from the audience got the highest final place and the one with the lowest got the lowest place.

Natalia Germanou was a guest judge of the night

#	Contestant	Performing as	Country	Song	Judges and Contestants				Audience	Total	Place
#	Contestant	Performing as	Country	Song	Judges^{1}	Extra^{2}	Total^{3}	Result^{4}	Audience	Total	Place
1	Vaggelis	Elpida	Greece	"Sokrati"	20 (7, 4, 4, 5)	5	25	5	3	8	10
2	Melina	Netta	Israel	"Toy"	41 (8, 12, 10, 11)	15	56	12	10	22	2
3	Eva	Eleni Foureira	Cyprus	"Fuego"	30 (10, 6, 6, 8)	5	35	9	6	15	6
4	Argiris	Salvador Sobral	Portugal	"Amar pelos dois"	43 (12, 10, 12, 9)	10	53	10	7	17	4
5	Eythimis	Rodolfo Chikilicuatre	Spain	"Baila el Chiki-chiki"	12 (3, 3, 3, 3)	-	12	3	5	8	8
6	Katerina	Conchita Wurst	Austria	"Rise Like a Phoenix"	45 (11, 11, 11, 12)	10	55	11	12	23	1
7	Pashalis	Verka Serduchka	Ukraine	"Dancing Lasha Tumbai"	34 (6, 9, 9, 10)	-	34	8	11	19	3
8	Chrispa	Michalis Rakintzis	Greece	"S.A.G.A.P.O."	21 (4, 8, 5, 4)	–	21	4	4	8	9
9	Ian	Sertab Erener	Turkey	"Everyway That I Can"	31 (9, 7, 8, 7)	-	31	7	9	16	5
10	Eleni	Ruslana	Ukraine	"Wild Dances"	23 (5, 5, 7, 6)	5	28	6	8	14	7

Notes
1. The points that judges gave in order (Georgoulis, Mazonakis, Denisi, Starovas).
2. Each contestant gave 5 points to a contestant of their choice.
3. Total of both extra and judges' score.
4. Result of both extra and judges' score.
5. In the final, only the audience voted for the winner and the one with the most votes won the competition.

=== Week 12 ===
The twelfth episode aired on April 14, 2019 and the winner was Vaggelis with 24 points. Vaggelis chose to give the money from the audience voting to the organization "Karelleio Protipo Kentro Alzheimer".

After the combined final scores, two contestants had 20 points and other two contestants had 16 points. The one who got the highest score from the audience got the highest final place and the one with the lowest got the lowest place.

Eythimis didn't participate to the live due to an accident he had.

#	Contestant	Performing as	Song	Judges and Contestants				Audience	Total	Place
#	Contestant	Performing as	Song	Judges^{1}	Extra^{2}	Total^{3}	Result^{4}	Audience	Total	Place
1	Eva	Whitney Houston	"I Wanna Dance with Somebody (Who Loves Me)"	35 (11, 8, 8, 8)	-	35	8	6	14	7
2	Chrispa	Ble	"Den Thelo"	39 (9, 10, 10, 10)	5	44	10	10	20	2
3	Argiris	Elvis Presley	"Can't Help Falling in Love"	37 (10, 9, 9, 9)	-	37	9	7	16	5
4	Vaggelis	Willy William	"Ego"	48 (12, 12, 12, 12)	30	78	12	12	24	1
5	Melina	Jason Derulo	"Swalla"	41 (8, 11, 11, 11)	5	46	11	9	20	3
6	Eleni	Foteini Velesiotou	"Melisses"	26 (7, 7, 7, 5)	-	26	7	5	11	8
7	Katerina	Kylie Minogue	"Can't Get You Out of My Head"	25 (6, 6, 6, 7)	5	30	6	8	15	6
8	Pashalis	Makis Christodoulopoulos	"Pantremenoi ki oi Dyo"	16 (4, 4, 4, 4)	–	16	4	4	8	9
9	Ian	Giannis Haroulis	"Chimonanthos"	21 (5, 5, 5, 6)	-	21	5	11	16	4

Notes
1. The points that judges gave in order (Georgoulis, Mazonakis, Denisi, Starovas).
2. Each contestant gave 5 points to a contestant of their choice.
3. Total of both extra and judges' score.
4. Result of both extra and judges' score.
5. In the final, only the audience voted for the winner and the one with the most votes won the competition.

=== Week 13: Semifinals ===
The twelfth episode aired on April 21, 2019 and the winner was Eva with 23 points. Evachose to give the money from the audience voting to the organization "Save Animal Greece".

After the combined final scores, two contestants had 11 points. The one who got the highest score from the audience got the highest final place and the one with the lowest got the lowest place.

In the semifinals, the four contestants with the highest cumulative scores from all 12 weeks were announced and were the ones to compete in the finals. The four finalists were; Ian with 238 points, Katerina with 227 points, Argiris with 208 points and Melina with 197 points. It was also the last time the judges were going to score the contestants since the winner is decided only by the audience.

#	Contestant	Performing as	Song	Judges and Contestants				Audience	Total	Place
#	Contestant	Performing as	Song	Judges^{1}	Extra^{2}	Total^{3}	Result^{4}	Audience	Total	Place
1	Eleni	Milva	"Thalass"	28 (5, 8, 7, 8)	-	28	7	6	13	6
2	Eythimis	Vaggelis Seilinos	"Sunshine For Your Dreams"	20 (4, 6, 5, 5)	-	20	5	4	9	9
3	Ian	Phil Collins	"In the Air Tonight"	39 (9, 10, 10, 10)	5	44	10	12	22	2
4	Melina	Eleni Tsaligopoulou	"Na M'agapas"	43 (8, 12, 11, 12)	5	48	11	10	21	3
5	Pashalis	David Gilmour	"Wish You Were Here"	14 (3, 4, 3, 4)	-	14	3	3	6	10
6	Vaggelis	Rage Against the Machine	"Killing in the Name"	37 (10, 9, 9, 9)	-	37	9	9	18	4
7	Eva	Janis Joplin	"Cry Baby"	46 (12, 11, 12, 11)	35	81	12	11	23	1
8	Katerina	Haris Alexiou	"Mia Einai i Ousia"	16 (6, 3, 4, 3)	–	16	4	7	11	7
9	Argiris	Bon Jovi	"Always"	26 (7, 5, 8, 6)	-	26	6	5	11	8
10	Chrispa	Alicia Keys	"Fallin'"	31 (11, 7, 6, 7)	5	36	8	8	16	5

Notes
1. The points that judges gave in order (Georgoulis, Mazonakis, Denisi, Starovas).
2. Each contestant gave 5 points to a contestant of their choice.
3. Total of both extra and judges' score.
4. Result of both extra and judges' score.
5. In the final, only the audience voted for the winner and the one with the most votes won the competition.

=== Week 14: Finals ===
The fourteenth and final live aired on May 5, 2019 and the winner of the show was Ian Stratis. The income from the audience voting for the final, was divided in ten equal parts and was given to all ten foundations that the contestants were representing during the twelve live shows.

At the beginning of the show, Bekatorou performed the songs "Mamma Mia" and "Dancing Queen" by ABBA.

The six contestants who did not compete in the finals, received a special award for their participation on the show. John Tikis, Tony Sfinos, Lefteris Pantazis, Giorgos Mazonakis, Anna Athanasiadi and Eleni Karakasi gave the awards to the contestants. Also, Themis Adamadidis appearedto give the award to one of the finalists.

#	Contestant	Performing as	Song	Result^{5}
1	Ian	Bruno Mars	"When I Was Your Man"	Winner
2	Katerina	Lady Gaga	"Shallow"	Runner-up
3	Melina	Whitney Houston	"I Have Nothing"	3rd place
4	Argiris	Dan Stevens	"Evermore"	4th place
5/6	Eleni- Vaggelis	Liza Minnelli & Luciano Pavarotti	"Theme from New York, New York"	Did; Not; Scored
7/8	Eva- Eythimis	Alexia & Vlassis Bonatsos	"Eisai Paidi Mou Peirasmos"	Did; Not; Scored
9/10	Chrispa- Pashalis	Glykeria & Kostas Makedonas	"Antikrista"	Did; Not; Scored

Notes
1. The points that judges gave in order (Georgoulis, Mazonakis, Denisi, Starovas).
2. Each contestant gave 5 points to a contestant of their choice.
3. Total of both extra and judges' score.
4. Result of both extra and judges' score.
5. In the final, only the audience voted for the winner and the one with the most votes won the competition.

== Results chart ==
Contestant	Week 1	Week 2	Week 3	Week 4	Week 5	Week 6	Week 7	Week 8	Week 9	Week 10	Week 11	Week 12	Week 13	Week 14 Final	Total
Ian	2nd 21 points	2nd 22 points	7th 10 points	6th 14 points	2nd 21 points	1st 24 points	1st 22 points	6th 14 points	2nd 21 points	4th 15 points	5th 16 points	4th 16 points	2nd 22 points	1st	238
Katerina	7th 13 points	1st 24 points	6th 15 points	2nd 20 points	4th 17 points	5th 16 points	2nd 20 points	1st 23 points	3rd 19 points	8th 11 points	1st 23 points	6th 15 points	7th 11 points	2nd	227
Melina	10th 9 points	5th 15 points	3rd 19 points	9th 10 points	1st 24 points	7th 14 points	10th 8 points	7th 13 points	7th 10 points	7th 12 points	2nd 22 points	3rd 20 points	3rd 21 points	3rd	197
Argiris	1st 22 points	8th 12 points	4th 19 points	4th 17 points	7th 13 points	2nd 19 points	3rd 20 points	3rd 20 points	6th 15 points	10th 7 points	4th 17 points	5th 16 points	8th 11 points	4th	208
Eva	3rd 19 points	3rd 16 points	1st 23 points	5th 17 points	10th 7 points	10th 7 points	9th 8 points	4th 16 points	9th 9 points	3rd 21 points	6th 15 points	7th 14 points	1st 23 points	—	195
Vaggelis	4th 16 points	7th 13 points	2nd 22 points	7th 12 points	8th 11 points	4th 17 points	8th 11 points	10th 6 points	8th 10 points	2nd 22 points	10th 8 points	1st 24 points	4th 18 points	—	190
Eleni	8th 13 points	4th 16 points	10th 8 points	8th 11 points	6th 15 points	6th 15 points	6th 14 points	2nd 23 points	5th 16 points	6th 14 points	7th 14 points	8th 11 points	6th 13 points	—	183
Chrispa	5th 14 points	10th 8 points	8th 10 points	3rd 19 points	9th 8 points	3rd 19 points	5th 15 points	5th 16 points	4th 18 points	9th 10 points	9th 8 points	2nd 20 points	5th 16 points	—	181
Pashalis	9th 10 points	9th 9 points	5th 15 points	1st 24 points	5th 16 points	9th 8 points	7th 13 points	8th 10 points	10th 8 points	1st 23 points	3rd 19 points	9th 8 points	10th 6 points	—	169
Eythimis	6th 13 points	6th 15 points	9th 9 points	10th 6 points	3rd 18 points	8th 11 points	4th 19 points	9th 9 points	1st 24 points	5th 15 points	8th 8 points	—	9th 9 points	—	156

indicates the contestant came first that week.
indicates the contestant came last that week.
indicates the contestant that didn't compete.
performed but didn't score
indicates the winning contestant.
indicates the runner-up contestant.
indicates the third-place contestant.
indicates the fourth-place contestant.

== Performances ==
Contestants	Week 1	Week 2	Week 3	Week 4	Week 5	Week 6	Week 7	Week 8	Week 9	Week 10	Week 11	Week 12	Week 13	Week 14 Final
Ian	Katy Perry	Freddie Mercury of Queen	Nikos Oikonomopoulos	Justin Timberlake	Kalomira	Led Zeppelin	Prince	The Weeknd	Teris Chrisos	Eminem	Sertab Erener	Giannis Haroulis	Phil Collins	Bruno Mars
Katerina	Paola	Dimitra Galani	Cher	Vanilla Ice	Aliki Vougiouklaki	Maria Farantouri	Nicki Minaj	Alice Cooper	Eleonora Zouganeli	Modern Talking	Conchita Wurst	Kylie Minogue	Haris Alexiou	Lady Gaga
Melina	Evridiki	Christina Aguilera	Anna Vissi	Dua Lipa	Melina Aslanidou	Themis Adamadidis	Jennifer Lopez	Angela Dimitriou	Evanescence	Efi Thodi	Netta	Jason Derulo	Eleni Tsaligopoulou	Whitney Houston
Argiris	Ed Sheeran	Christos Thivaios	Cher	Damien Rice	Giannis Vogiatzis	Elsa	Giannis Parios	Gene Kelly	Britney Spears	Dakis	Salvador Sobral	Elvis Presley	Bon Jovi	Dan Stevens
Eva	Sam Smith	Camila Cabello	Maria Callas	Beyoncé	David Bowie	Alkistis Protopsalti	Panos Kiamos	Jessie J	Natassa Theodoridou	Grizabella- Cats	Eleni Foureira	Whitney Houston	Janis Joplin	Alexia
Vaggelis	R.E.M.	Stelios Kazantzidis	Drake	Giorgos Mazonakis	Bono of U2	Imagine Dragons	Pharrell Williams	Polina	The Cure	Bee Gees & AC/DC	Elpida	Willy William	Rage Against the Machine	Luciano Pavarotti
Eleni	Sperantza Vrana	Tony Sfinos	Vicky Moscholiou	Rena Morfi a.k.a. Souli Anatoli	Raffaella Carrà	Kostis Maraveyas	Zozo Sapountzaki	Grace Jones	Rena Vlahopoulou	Rita Sakellariou	Ruslana	Foteini Velesiotou	Milva	Liza Minnelli
Chrispa	Cardi B	Katy Garbi	Stefanos Korkolis	Jessica Rabbit	Vasilis Karras	Adele	Madonna	Marinella	Mary Poppins	Eurythmics	Michalis Rakintzis	Ble	Alicia Keys	Glykeria
Pashalis	Giorgos Margaritis	John Tikis	Nikos Karvelas	The Prodigy	Grigoris Bithikotsis	Pyramidos	Tania Tsanaklidou	Locomondo	Johnny Cash	Dionysis Savvopoulos	Verka Serduchka	Makis Christodoulopoulos	David Gilmour	Kostas Makedonas
Eythimis	Sakis Rouvas	Lefteris Pantazis	Panos Mouzourakis	Tolis Voskopoulos	Snik	Luis Fonsi	Stratos Dionysiou	Les Chakachas	Vasilis Papakonstantinou	Manolis Kontaros	Rodolfo Chikilicuatre	—	Vaggelis Seilinos	Vlassis Bonatsos

indicates the contestant came first that week.
indicates the contestant came last that week.
indicates the contestant that didn't compete.
performed but didn't score
indicates the winning contestant.
indicates the runner-up contestant.
indicates the third-place contestant.
indicates the fourth-place contestant.

== Ratings ==
Episode		Date	Ratings (total)	Ratings (ages 18–54)	Source
1	Week 1	January 27, 2019	29%	29.7%	
2	Week 2	February 3, 2019	24%	21.6%	
3	Week 3	February 10, 2019	23.1%	21.9%	
4	Week 4	February 18, 2019	24.9%	24.3%	
5	Week 5	February 24, 2019	24.4%	23%	
6	Week 6	March 3, 2019	24.5%	25%	
7	Week 7	March 10, 2019	23.3%	23.7%	
8	Week 8	March 17, 2019	20.4%	20.3%	
9	Week 9	March 24, 2019	21.3%	21.1%	
