= Tonia Sotiropoulou =

Greek actress (born 1987)

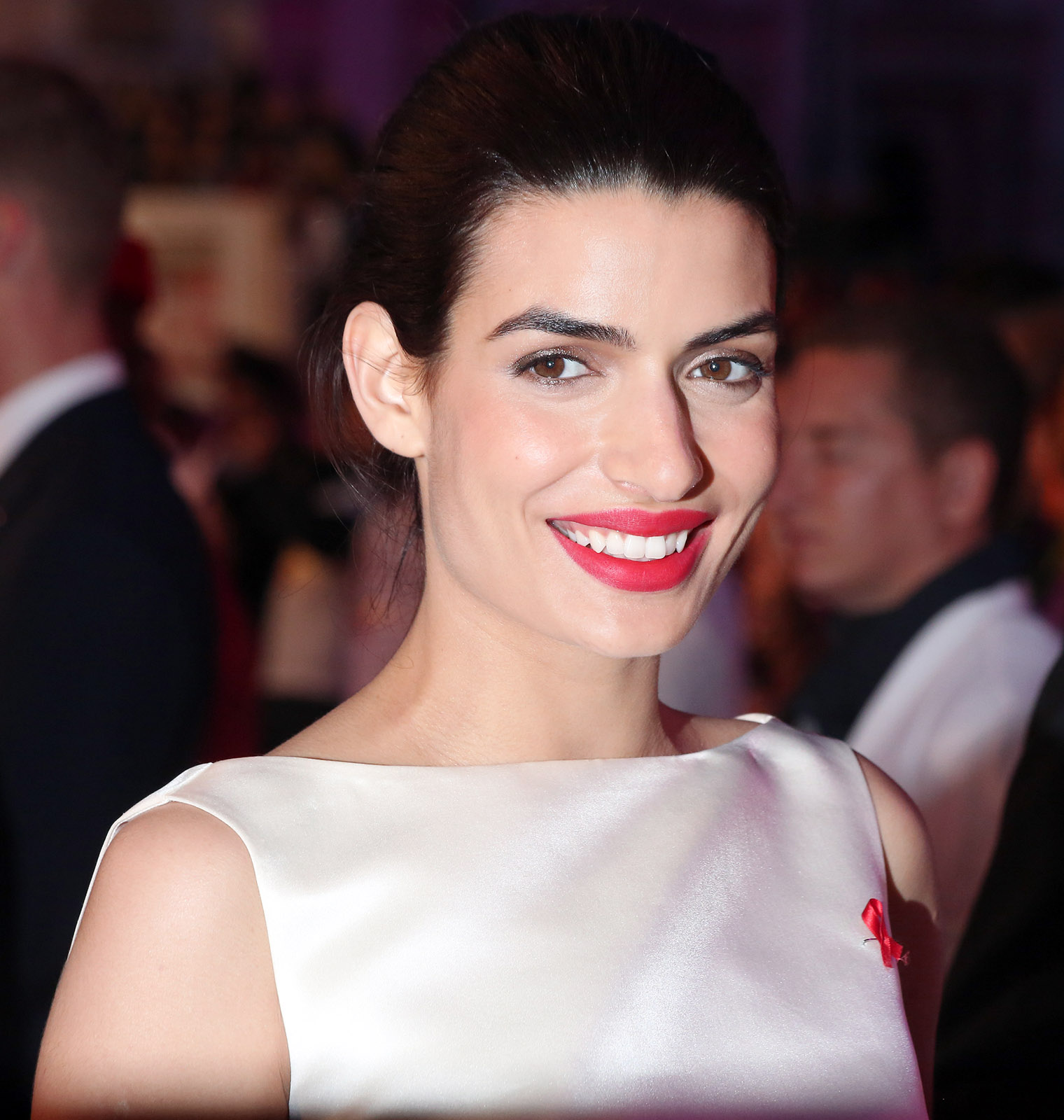
- Sotiropoulou at the 2013 Life Ball
- Born: 28 April 1987 (age 38); Glyfada, Athens Prefecture, Greece
- Occupation: Actress
- Years active: 2007–present
- Known for: Bond girl
- Spouse: Kostis Maraveyas (m. 2021)

Tonia Sotiropoulou (Greek: Τόνια Σωτηροπούλου, pronounced [ˈtoɲa sotiroˈpulu]; born 28 April 1987) is a Greek actress.

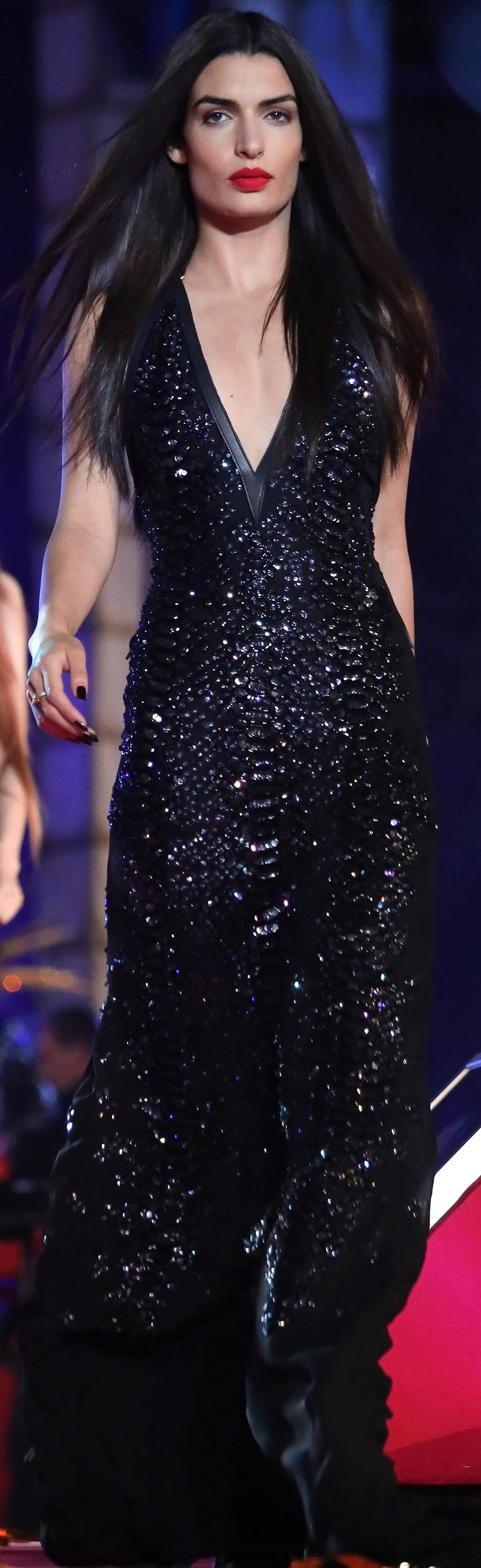
Sotiropoulou walking the runway at the opening show of Life Ball

== Personal life ==
In October 2021 Sotiropoulou wed Greek singer-songwriter Kostis Maraveyas also known by his stage name Maraveyas ilegál.

== Filmography ==
=== Film ===
Year	Film	Role	Notes
2007	Cool	Hrysi	Original title: Ψυχραιμία
2012	Berberian Sound Studio	Elena	
2012	Skyfall	Bond's Lover	
2012	Normal (Real Stories from the Sex Industry	Candy	
2012	Paolo	Francesca	Short film
2014	Hercules	Vixen	
2016	Kidnap	Woman	Short film, Original title: ΑΠΑΓΩΓΗ
2016	Brotherhood	Janette	
2016	The Bachelor	Errica	
2017	Success Story	Vasiliki Kavagia	
2017	Everything Is Wonderful	Maria	
2017	Mandelion	Melinoe	Short film
2018	Waiting Room	Katia	
2021	Man of God	Maria	Original title: Ο Άνθρωπος του Θεού
2021	Saison Morte		

=== Television ===
Year	Film	Role	Notes
2008	True Love	Elissavet	Episode: The Photograph
2008	Golden Girls	Kelly	Episode: Season 1, Episode 9
2008	I Saw You...	Jenny	Episode: I Saw You... at the crime scene'
2009	Lola	Romina	4 episodes
2020–2021	Our Best Years	Antigone	Series regular, 19 episodes
2023	Zoe	Daphne	Episode: Dora
2023	Milky Way	Nikis	2 episodes
