= Kirios ma ke alitis =

Kirios Ma... Kai Alitis Κύριος Μα... Και Αλήτης

Studio album by Vasilis Karras
- Released: Sep 9, 2013
- Recorded: Power Music studio (Athens); New Sound studio (Thessaloniki)
- Genre: Contemporary Laïka, Rock
- Length: 43:50
- Language: Greek
- Label: The Spicy Effect
- Producer: Phoebus

Vasilis Karras chronology
Teatro Music Hall (2012)	Kirios Ma... Kai Alitis; Κύριος Μα... Και Αλήτης (2013)	Epilogi Mou (2014)

Singles from Kirios Ma... Kai Alitis
- 1. "Agapo Ta Lathos Atoma" Released: 13 March 2013; 2. "Ti Na Mas Peis" Released: 26 June 2013; 3. "Perastika Tis" Released: 11 September 2013

Kirios Ma... Kai Alitis (Greek: Κύριος Μα... Και Αλήτης; English: Main But... Also A Bum) is the fortieth studio album by Greek singer Vasilis Karras.

It was released on 8 September 2013 as a covermount with Greek newspaper, Real News, and from 9 September 2013 to all music stores by The Spicy Effect, in Greece. The album was recorded in Athens and Thessaloniki and was the fourth time that Vasilis collaborate with Phoebus. It received sevenfold platinum certification, selling 73,400 units with the newspaper's release and over 84,000 units overall.

== Track listing ==
No.	Title	Lyrics	Music	Length
1.	"Ti Na Mas Peis" (Τι Να Μας Πεις; What Do You Tell Us)	Phoebus	Phoebus	3:42
2.	"Agapo Ta Lathos Atoma" (Αγαπώ Τα Λάθος Άτομα; I Love The Wrong People)	Phoebus	Phoebus	4:19
3.	"Perastika Tis" (Περαστικά Της; Get Well Of Her)	Phoebus	Phoebus	2:53
4.	"Diskole Mou Haraktira" (Δύσκολε Μου Χαρακτήρα; My Difficult Character)	Phoebus	Phoebus	3:37
5.	"Parakmi" (Παρακμή; Decline)	Vasilis Karras	Phoebus	3:28
6.	"Melagholiki Mou Agapi" (Μελαγχολική Μου Αγάπη; My Melancholy Love)	Phoebus	Phoebus	3:48
7.	"180 Moires" (180 Μοίρες; 180 Degrees)	Phoebus	Phoebus	3:11
8.	"Trapouloharta" (Τραπουλόχαρτα; Playing Cards)	Phoebus	Phoebus	4:07
9.	"Ti Allo" (Τι Άλλο; What Else)	Phoebus	Phoebus	3:50
10.	"Katedafizetai" (Κατεδαφίζεται; Demolished)	Eleni Giannatsoulia	Phoebus	3:28
11.	"Apousiazo" (Απουσιάζω; I'm Not Here)	Eleni Giannatsoulia	Phoebus	3:44
12.	"Kati Parapano" (Κάτι Παραπάνω; More Than That)	Phoebus	Phoebus	3:31
Total length:				43:50

== Credits ==
=== Personnel ===
Alexandros Arkadopoulos: clarinet (tracks: 2)

Giorgos Atmatsidis: lyre (tracks: 9)

Romeos Avlastimidis: violin (tracks: 2)

Eleanna Azouki: backing vocals (tracks: 9)

Christos Bousdoukos: violin (tracks: 5)

Giorgos Chatzopoulos: guitars (tracks: 1, 2, 3, 4, 5, 6, 7, 8, 9, 10, 11)

Akis Diximos: second vocal || backing vocals (tracks: 3, 9)

Kostas Doxas: backing vocals (tracks: 9)

Charis Galanis: backing vocals (tracks: 3, 9)

Vahan Galstyan: clarinet, duduk (tracks: 8)

Antonis Gounaris: guitars, keyboards, orchestration, programming (tracks: 12)

Telis Kafkas: bass (tracks: 1, 2, 4, 5, 6, 8, 9)

Vasilis Nikolopoulos: drums (tracks: 1, 2, 4, 6, 8, 9) || keyboards, orchestration, programming (tracks: 1, 2, 3, 4, 5, 6, 7, 8, 9, 10, 11)

Thimios Papadopoulos: flute (tracks: 4)

Thanasis Petrelis: baglama (tracks: 7, 9, 10) || bouzouki (tracks: 5, 6, 7, 8, 9, 10, 11) || säz (tracks: 6, 8, 11) || tzoura (tracks: 5, 7, 8, 9, 10, 11)

Phoebus: keyboards (tracks: 2, 9) || orchestration (tracks: 1, 2, 4, 5, 6, 8, 9, 11) || programming (tracks: 9)

Stefania Rizou: backing vocals (tracks: 9)

Giorgos Roilos: percussion (tracks: 2, 11)

=== Production ===
Giannis Gkiouras (New Sound studio): sound engineer [vocals] (tracks: 4, 5, 6, 7, 8, 9, 10, 11)

Vasilis Nikolopoulos (Power Music studio): mix engineer

Phoebus: executive producer, mix engineer

Vaggelis Siapatis (Power Music studio): coordinatior, editing, sound engineer

Paul Stefanidis (Viking Lounge studio): mastering

=== Cover ===
Manolis Chiotis: photographer [back cover]

Kostas Gkoras: photographer [booklet, front cover]

You And I: art direction

== Notes ==
- The vocals at tracks 1, 2, 3 and 12 were recorded at Power Music Studio.
- The vocals at tracks 4, 5, 6, 7, 8, 9, 10 and 11 were recorded at Studio New Sound, a Giannis Gkiouras's studio at Thessaloniki.
- The drums were recorded at Studio Sierra.

Credits adapted from the album's liner notes.

== Chart performance ==
Kirios Ma... Kai Alitis, after a month on the charts, it was certified 7×Platinum by IFPI.

Chart	Peak position	Certification
Greece Top 20	1	7×Platinum
