= Fenomeno (Vasilis Karras song) =

1998 song performed by Vasilis Karras

"Fenomeno Φαινόμενο"

Single by Vasilis Karras
- Released: 1998
- Recorded: Studio Phase One
- Genre: Laïka, contemporary laïka
- Length: 7:29
- Label: Minos EMI
- Songwriter(s): Phoebus
- Producer(s): Achileas Theofilou

Fenomeno (Greek: Φαινόμενο; English: Phainomeno) is a CD single by Greek singer Vasilis Karras. It was released in 1998 and gained platinum status. The two songs were also released on album "Epistrefo" the next year, in 1999.

== Track listing ==
1. "Fainomeno" - 3:27
2. "Se eiha psila" - 4:02

Music and lyrics by Phoebus.

== Personnel ==
Personnel

- Phoebus-music, lyrics, arrangement, programming, keyboards, background vocals
- Andreas Mouzakis-drums
- Pavlos Diamantopoulos-electric bass
- Giannis Bithikotsis-bouzouki, tzoura, baglama
- Hakan-saz
- Thanasis Vasilopoulos-clarinet, nei
- Nikos Hatzopoulos-guitars (electric, 12-strings, acoustic)
- Giorgos Roilos-percussion
- Fedon Lionoudakis-accordion
- Katerina Kiriakou, Alex Panayi, Christina Argiri-background vocals
- Kostas Anagnostou-second vocals

Production

- Achilleas Theofilou-production manager
- Manolis Vlahos-sound, mix
- Giorgos Stampolis, Alexandros Vourazelis, Vaggelis Siapatis - sound
- Giorgos Stampolis-sound, computer editing
- Thodoris Chrisanthopoulos-digital mastering (Fabelsound)
- Giannis Sarlis-artwork

Credits adapted from the album's liner notes.
