= Tilefonise mou =

Tilefonise Mou Τηλεφώνησε Μου

Studio album by Vasilis Karras
- Released: 26/02/1996
- Recorded: Sierra studio
- Genre: Contemporary laïka
- Length: 43:08
- Language: Greek
- Label: Minos EMI
- Producer: Achilleas Theofilou

Vasilis Karras chronology
Ftais Esi... (1995)	Tilefonise Mou; Τηλεφώνησε Μου (1996)	M' Eheis Kanei Aliti (1997)

Singles from Tilefonise Mou
- 1. "Tilefonise Mou" Released: 26 February 1996; 2. "Gi' Afto Stasou" Released: April 1996; 3. "Aporo An Esthanese Tipsis" Released: May 1996; 4. "Pite Tis" Released: July 1996; 5. "Eho Anagki Na Vgo" Released: August 1996

Tilefonise Mou (Greek: Τηλεφώνησε Μου; English: Call Me) is the twenty-first studio album by Greek singer Vasilis Karras. It was released on 26 February 1996 by Minos EMI and received double-platinum status, selling 120,000 units in Greece. It is his first collaboration with songwriter Phoebus who was written entirely the album, containing many of his most successful songs, including "Gi' Afto Stasou", "Aporo An Esthanese Tipsis", "Tilefonise Mou" and "Eho Anagki Na Vgo".

== Track listing ==
All tracks are written by Phoebus

No.	Title	Length
1.	"Gi' Afto Stasou" (Γι' Αυτό Στάσου; So Hold On)	4:07
2.	"Aporo An Esthanese Tipsis" (Απορώ Αν Αισθάνεσαι Τύψεις; I Wonder If You Feel Remorse)	3:54
3.	"Den Eho Na Sou Po" (Δεν Έχω Να Σου Πω; I've Nothing To Tell You)	3:53
4.	"Tilefonise Mou" (Τηλεφώνησε Μου; Call Me)	4:17
5.	"De Sou Epitrepete" (Δε Σου Επιτρέπεται; You're Not Allowed)	3:21
6.	"Pite Tis" (Πείτε Της; Tell Her)	4:32
7.	"Ti Sihathike I Psihi Mou" (Τη Σιχάθηκε Η Ψυχή Μου; My Soul Is Sick Of Her)	4:16
8.	"Den Iparhi Periptosi" (Δεν Υπάρχει Περίπτωση; No Way)	3:47
9.	"Eho Anagki Na Vgo" (Έχω Ανάγκη Να Βγω; I Need To Go Out)	4:04
10.	"I Agapes Panta Telionoun" (Οι Αγάπες Πάντα Τελειώνουν; Loves Always End)	3:41
11.	"Ipofero Gia Mas" (Υποφέρω Για Μας; I Suffer For Us)	3:16
Total length:		43:08

== Singles ==
The following singles were officially released to radio stations with music videos and became successful hits, managed to gain radio airplay.

- Tilefonise Mou (Call Me)
- Gi' Afto Stasou (So Hold On)
- Aporo An Esthanese Tipsis (I Wonder If You Feel Remorse)
- Pite Tis (Tell Her)
- Eho Anagki Na Vgo (I Need To Go Out)

== Credits ==
Credits adapted from liner notes.

=== Personnel ===
- Eleni Antoniadou – backing vocals
- Yiannis Bithikotsis – bouzouki (2, 3, 6, 8, 9) / cura (1, 3, 4, 10) / baglama (3, 6, 8, 10)
- Rania Dizikiriki – backing vocals
- Antonis Gounaris – guitars
- Katerina Kyriakou – backing vocals
- Giorgos Kostoglou – bass
- Fedon Lionoudakis – accordion (1, 6, 8)
- Andreas Mouzakis – drums
- Alex Panayi – backing vocals (1, 2, 3, 4, 6, 7, 9, 10, 11)
- Phoebus – orchestration, programming, keyboards / backing vocals (1, 2, 3, 4, 6, 7, 8, 9, 10, 11)
- Giorgos Roilos – percussion (1, 2, 4, 6, 7, 10) / harmonica (7)
- Manolis Samaras – backing vocals (1, 2, 3, 4, 6, 7, 9, 10, 11)
- Thanasis Vasilopoulos – clarinet (9) / ney (4, 5)
- Vaggelis Yiannopoulos – backing vocals (1, 2, 3, 4, 6, 7, 9, 10, 11)

=== Production ===
- Achilleas Charitos – styling
- Thodoris Chrisanthopoulos (Fabelsound) – transfer
- Yiannis Chronopoulos – sound engineer
- Ntinos Diamantopoulos – cover photographer
- Giannis Ioannidis (Digital Press Hellas) – mastering
- Manolis Kalogeropoulos – studio photographer
- Vaggelis Papadopoulos – sound engineer, mix engineer
- Maria Pitsokou – art direction
- Panayiotis Rizopoulos – sound engineer
- Frank Wönne – assistant sound engineer

== Charts ==
Chart	Provider	Certification
Greek Singles Chart	IFPI	2×Platinum
