= Vasilis Karras =

Greek singer (1953–2023)

Vasilis Karras Βασίλης Καρράς
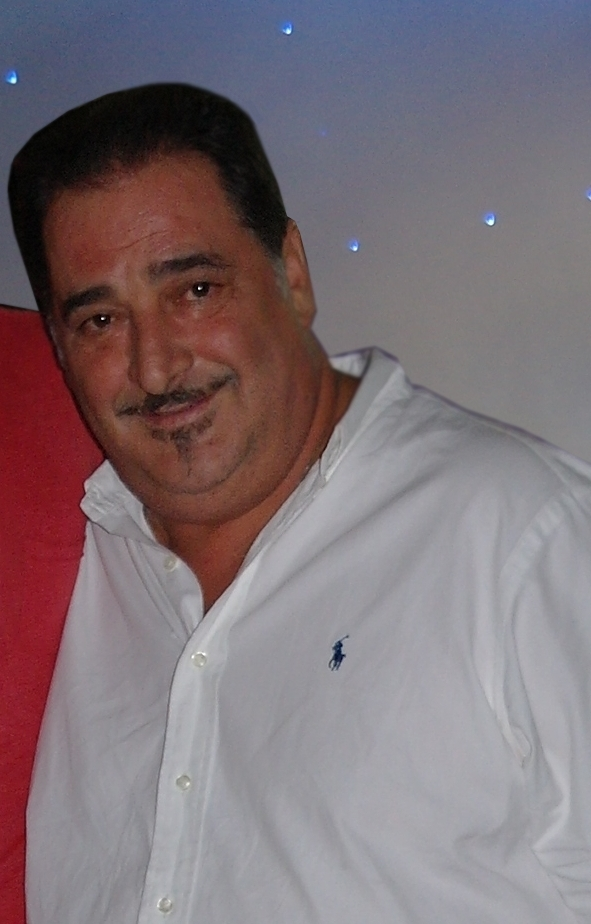
- Karras in 2012

Background information
- Also known as: Vasilis Karras
- Born: Vasilis Kesoglidis (Βασίλης Κεσογλίδης); 12 November 1953; Kokkinochori, Kingdom of Greece
- Died: 24 December 2023 (aged 70) Interbalkan Medical Center, Pylaia, Greece
- Genres: Contemporary laika, laïka
- Occupation: Singer
- Instrument: Vocals
- Years active: 1969–2023
- Labels: Vasipap, Minos EMI, Universal Music Greece, The Spicy Effect
- Website: https://vasilis-karras.gr/

Vasilis Karras (Greek: Βασίλης Καρράς; born Vasilis Kesoglidis, 12 November 1953 – 24 December 2023) was a Greek laïko singer.

== Early life ==
Karras was born on 12 November 1953 in Kokkinochori, to Pontian parents. At the age of 10, his family moved to Thessaloniki, where his brother and sister were born.

== Career ==
In the 1970s, Karras gained a reputation on the Greek laiko (folk songs) stage singing throughout Northern Greece, and towards the end of the decade had begun to develop his own repertoire, working with song writers and also creating his own work. His first album Alismonites ores was released in 1980 and around this time he decided to devote his life and career to folk music and sing professionally. Partnerships with Michalis Rakintzis, Zafeiris Melas and Konstantina also furthered his reputation in Greece. In 1996, Karras contacted songwriter Phoebus with the prospect of creating an album based on his songs. The result was the hit album Tilefonise mou which went two time platinum and is Karras' all time best-seller. This album also started a new era for Karras: the introduction of a modern, western upbeat style to his music, which complemented his bouzouki-based folk/dance songs. Karras and Phoebus also partnered for the 1999 album Epistrefo, a perennial mainstay in his club repertoire, with many hit singles.

Latterly he partnered with other mainstays of the Greek music scene such as Tolis Voskopoulos, Christos Dantis, Eirini Merkouri, Konstantina Konstantinou, Kostas Karafotis, Despina Vandi, Pantelis Pantelidis, Paola and others, writing and performing many duets in their respective albums.

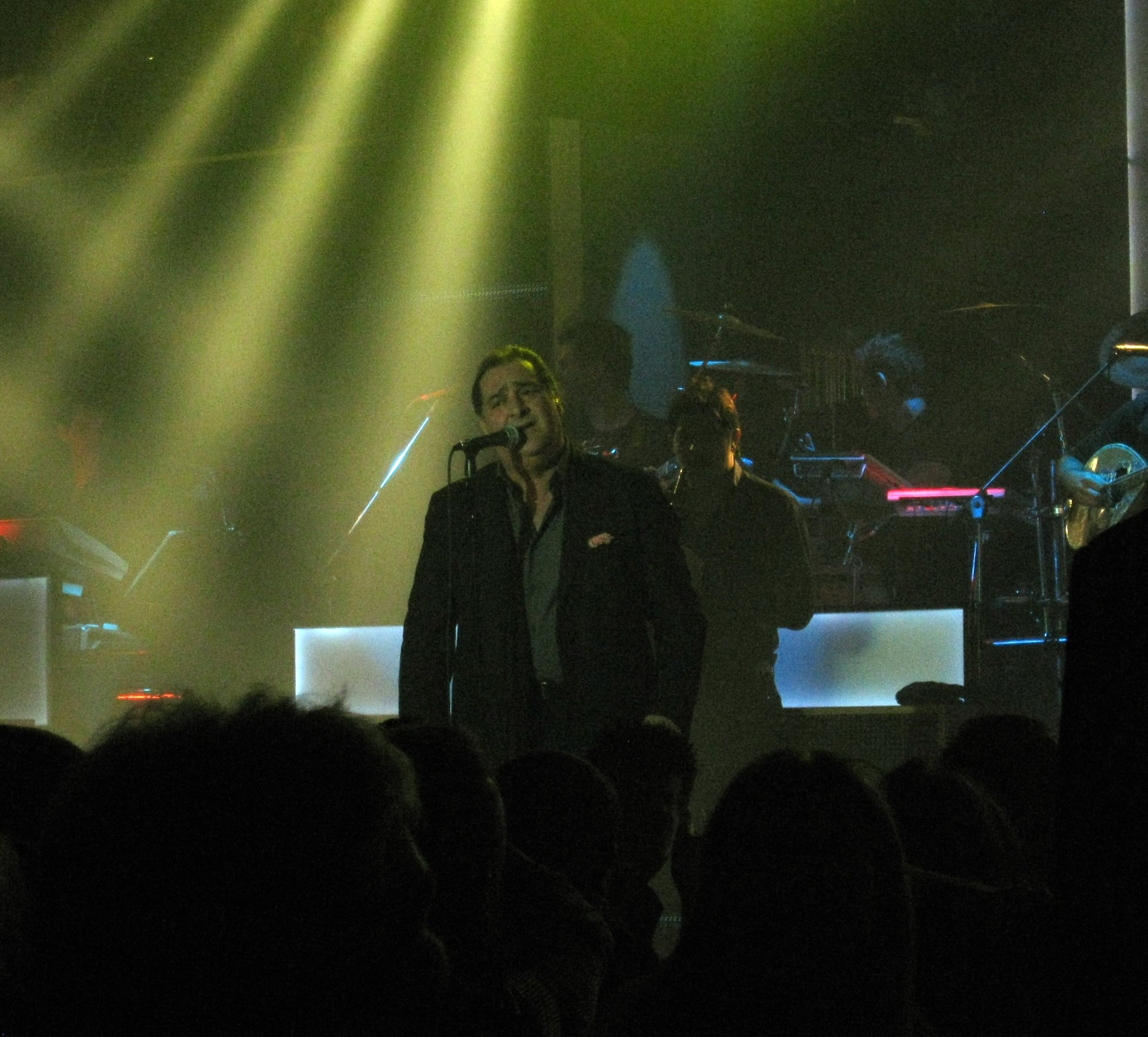
Karras performing in 2010.

His last album was released in early 2020, titled Rotas An Se Eho Erotefthi. Throughout his career he emphasized his love for his hometown and wrote and sang many songs about Thessaloniki reminiscing about his childhood and early loves including "Den Pao Pouthena", "Nychta Kselogiastra", "Erhomai" and "Gia Afto Stasou".

== Personal life and death ==
He was married to Christina Kesoglides and together they had a daughter, Irene. Karras, who was battling terminal cancer, contracted COVID-19 and later died from cardiac arrest due to COVID at Interbalkan Medical Center, on 24 December 2023, at age 70.

== Discography ==
- Alismonites ores (1980)
- Ti les kale (1982)
- Giati na horisoume (1984)
- Mi hathis (1985)
- Apo ti Thessaloniki me agapi (1987)
- Apoklistika gia sena (1988)
- Afti h nyxta (1989)
- Eisai pantou (1990)
- Lege oti thes (1991)
- Asteria tou Borra (1991)
- Den pao pouthena (1992)
- Tragoudia ap'to sirtari (1992)
- Nichta xelogiastra (1993)
- Pos tolmas (1993)
- O ilios tou himona me melagholi (1993)
- Sti Saliniki mia fora (1994)
- Hreose to se mena (1994)
- Mia bradia sta nea dilina (1995)
- 10 xronia (1995)
- Ftes esi (1995)
- Tilefonise mou (1996)
- Erhome (1996) (Song: "To dilitirio")
- M'echis kani aliti (1997)
- S'ena bradi oti zisoume (1997)
- Brechi sti Thessaloniki (1997)
- Fenomeno (1998)-CD Single
- Astin na leei (1999)
- Epistrefo (1999)
- 20 xronia (1999)
- I megaliteres epitichies (2000)
- Mabri lista (2000)
- Girise (2001)
- Ta dika mou tragoudia (2002)
- Logia tis nichtas (2002)
- Pare to dromo ke ela (2003)
- Basilis Karras DVD (2004)
- Telos (2004)
- Ola ena psema (2005)
- Oneira (2007)
- Ola mou ta hronia live (2008)
- Opos palia (2009)
- Έτσι Λαϊκά (Etsi Laika) (2012)
- Kirios ma ke alitis (Κύριος μα και...αλήτης) (2013)
- Ta Kalutera Taxidia (2016)
- Alhth me lene (2017)
- Rotas an s'eho erotefti (2020)
- Ime edo (2023)
