= Interbalkan Medical Center =

Interbalkan Medical Center Ιατρικό Διαβαλκανικό Κέντρο
- Athens Medical Group

Geography
- Location: Asklipiou 10, Pilea 555 35m, Thessaloniki, Greece
- Coordinates: 40.548087°N 22.987441°E

Organisation
- Type: General

Services
- Beds: 383

History
- Opened: 2000

Links
- Website: www.iatriko.gr
- Lists: Hospitals in Greece

The European Interbalkan Medical Center (Greek: Ιατρικό Διαβαλκανικό Κέντρο, Iatriko Diavalkaniko Kentro), is a major private general hospital located and based in Thessaloniki, Greece, on the road to the airport, opposite of the commercial center of Apollonia (Florida) and close to Mediterranean Cosmos. It was founded by businessman Giorgos Apostolopoulos in 2000. It offers a wide variety of medical and surgical treatments, and has 383 beds.
