= Antzy Samiou =

Greek singer (born 1960)

- Άντζυ Σαμίου
- Born: Angeliki Samiou; 7 March 1960 (age 66); Piraeus, Greece
- Occupations: Singer, songwriter, radio producer
- Years active: 1980–present
- Spouse: Takis Psiropoulos (m. 2010)
- Children: 1
- Parents: Panagiotis Samios (father); Maria Samiou (mother)
- Relatives: Garyfallia Litsa Samiou (older sister)
- Musical career
- Origin: Greece
- Genres: Laïko; Modern laïka; pop-folk
- Instrument: Vocals
- Labels: EMI (1992–1994) BMG Greece (1995–1999) Alpha Records (1999–2004) Heaven Music (2008–2009) Ogdoo Music (2020–present)

Angeliki "Antzy" Samiou (Greek: Αγγελική (Άντζυ) Σαμίου; born March 7, 1960) is a Greek modern laïka singer and also a radio producer.

== Biography ==
Antzy Samiou (Greek: Άντζυ Σαμίου) wanted to be a singer from a very young age and by the late '80s she started to work professionally singing in show centers and clubs. In 1990, she penned lyrics for Dimitris Mitropanos's (Greek: Δημήτρης Μητροπάνος) song "Esi Lege Me Erota" (Greek: Εσύ Λέγε Με Έρωτα, You May Call Me Love), which came out as a single from the album of the same name. On her birthday in March 1993, her debut album To Adynato Simeio Mou (Greek: Το Αδύνατο Σημείο μου, My Weak Spot) was released. The title track became a radio hit and she began to achieve recognition in the music industry.

In May 1995, her second studio album I Pio Glikia mou Amartia (Greek: Η πιο Γλυκιά μου Αμαρτία, My Sweetest Sin) was released and she began nightly appearances at an Athens club to promote it. Her third studio album Tou Erota I Mihani (Greek: Του Έρωτα η Μηχανή, The Love Machine) was released in October 1996, and the single "Mi Fevgeis Apopse" (Greek: Μη Φεύγεις Απόψε, Don't Leave Tonight) was voted the best ballad of year at the Pop Corn Music Awards.

By 1997, Samiou had released her fourth studio album Chaos (Greek: Χάος), which coincided with a Gothic stylistic redirection. She wrote many of the songs herself. In 1998, Thierry Mugler named Samiou his muse. He invited her to his atelier in Paris where he made several costumes for her and she did an editorial for a Greek fashion magazine wearing Mugler's outfits. Later that year, a fire at the club where Samiou was supposed to begin singing a few days later destroyed all of her costumes and her show was postponed. At that time she stated in an interview that Hellenic Radio and Television had contacted her in order to participate in the Eurovision Song Contest 1997, but she ended up not going. In November 1998 she delivered her album Apousies (Greek: Απουσίες, Absences).

In 1999, she decided to leave BMG Greece and signed a contract with Alpha Records which produced her sixth album Didimi Psihi (Greek: Δίδυμη Ψυχή, Twin Soul), becoming her first gold-certified album by February 2000. It featured eleven tracks with music by Kostas Miliotakis and lyrics by Smaroula Maragoudaki. By late 2000, Samiou entered the studio to record her seventh album Axizo (Greek: Αξίζω, I'm Worhy), which unlike her last album that was composed by Kostas Miliotakis with lyrics by Smaroula Maragoudaki, Axizo was composed by Samiou herself. It was released in January 2001 and soon became gold. Later on that year, she released her eighth album, the self-titled Antzy. In December 2004 she released her ninth album Aisthiseis (Greek: Αισθήσεις).

After a four-year break in recording, Samiou released in 2008 the five-track EP Aspirini (Greek: Ασπιρίνη, Aspirin) under the Heaven Music record label. The title track is a cover of Seka Aleksić's 2007 song "Aspirin".

== Discography ==
Year	Title	Certification	Label
1993	To Adynato Simeio Mou	- 15.000	EMI
1995	I Pio Glikia Mou Amartia	17.000	RCA
1996	Tou Erota I Mihani	15.000	Sony BMG
1997	Chaos	20.000	RCA
1998	Apousies	22.000	RCA
1999	Didimi Psihi	Gold 25.000	Alpha Records
2000	Axizo	Gold 35.000	Alpha Records
2001	Antzy	Gold 30.000	Alpha Records
2002	100 Fores	- 10.000	Alpha Records
2003	Pata Gkazi	- 6.000	Alpha Records
2004	Aisthiseis	- 8.000	Alpha Records
2008	Aspirini	6.000 Gold	Heaven Music

=== Compilations ===
Year	Various	Label
2000	Ki Ego Edo - Megalyteres Epitihies	RCA
2002	Soma Kai Psyhi - Oles Oi Epitihies	Capitol Records
2002	Hryses Epitihies	Alpha Records
2006	Megales Epitihies	Alpha Records
2008	Antzy Samiou: The Digital Collection	Columbia
2023	Best of Antzy Samiou	Alpha Records

=== Singles and EPs ===
Year	Title	Label
2020	Odos Tou Aurio	B-Otherside

== Music videos ==
Year	Title	Album
1993	"To Adynato Simeio Mou" (My weak spot)	To Adynato Simeio Mou
1993	"Thelo Na Diloso Erotevmeni" (I want to declare I'm in love)	To Adynato Simeio Mou
1993	"Se Thelo Na Parakalas" (I want you to beg me)	To Adynato Simeio Mou
1995	"Ponos Eisai Kai Klamata" (You 're pain and tears)	I Pio Glikia Mou Amartia
1995	"I Pio Glikia Mou Amartia" (My sweetest sin)	I Pio Glikia Mou Amartia
1995	"Angelos Ksanthos" (Blonde angel)	I Pio Glikia Mou Amartia
1996	"Oute Kapnizo Oute Pino" (Neither I drink, nor I smoke)	Tou Erota I Mihani
1996	"Mi Fevgeis Apopse" (Don't leave tonight)	Tou Erota I Mihani
1996	"Gi' Afta Ta Matia" (For these eyes)	Tou Erota I Mihani
1996	"Fantaraki" (Little soldier)	Tou Erota I Mihani
1997	"Soma ke Psychi" (Body and soul)	Chaos
1997	"Chaos"	Chaos
1998	"Mia Sou Ke Mia Mou" (One for you, one for me)	Apousies
1998	"Ki Ego Edo" (And I'm here)	Apousies
1998	"Pes Mou Giati" (Tell me why)	Apousies
1998	"Imisferia" (Hemispheres)	Apousies
1999	"Kleftes ki astynomoi" (Robbers and cops)	Didimi Psihi
1999	"Parallili Agapi" (Parallel Love)	Didimi Psihi
1999	"Kaftra" (Wick)	Didimi Psihi
2000	"Agoraki" (Little boy)	Axizo
2000	"Pikri Ousia" (Bitter essence)	Axizo
2000	"Pou Mirazoun Dinami" (Where they share power)	Axizo
