= Bessy Argyraki =

Greek pop singer

Bessy Argyraki Μπέσσυ Αργυράκη
- Born: Vasileia Argyraki; 4 April 1957 (age 69); Athens, Greece
- Genres: Pop, Elafrolaiko
- Occupation: Singer
- Years active: 1975–present
- Website: www.facebook.com/Bessy-Argyraki-1481743728800746/

Bessy Argyraki (born 4 April 1957 in Athens) is a Greek pop singer who started her career in the mid-1970s and recorded albums until the mid '90s. She has represented Greece in many International festivals. She has released a single and an album in Japan. The single, toshihiko, entered the Japanese Singles' Top 10. She is married to a doctor and she is a member of the city council in Glyfada.

Argyraki is best known for representing Greece in the Eurovision Song Contest 1977 and also for her covers of many European hits. Her covers include songs by France Gall, Raffaella Carrà, Kim Wilde and Dolly Parton.
