= Kostis Maraveyas =

Greek singer (born 1974)

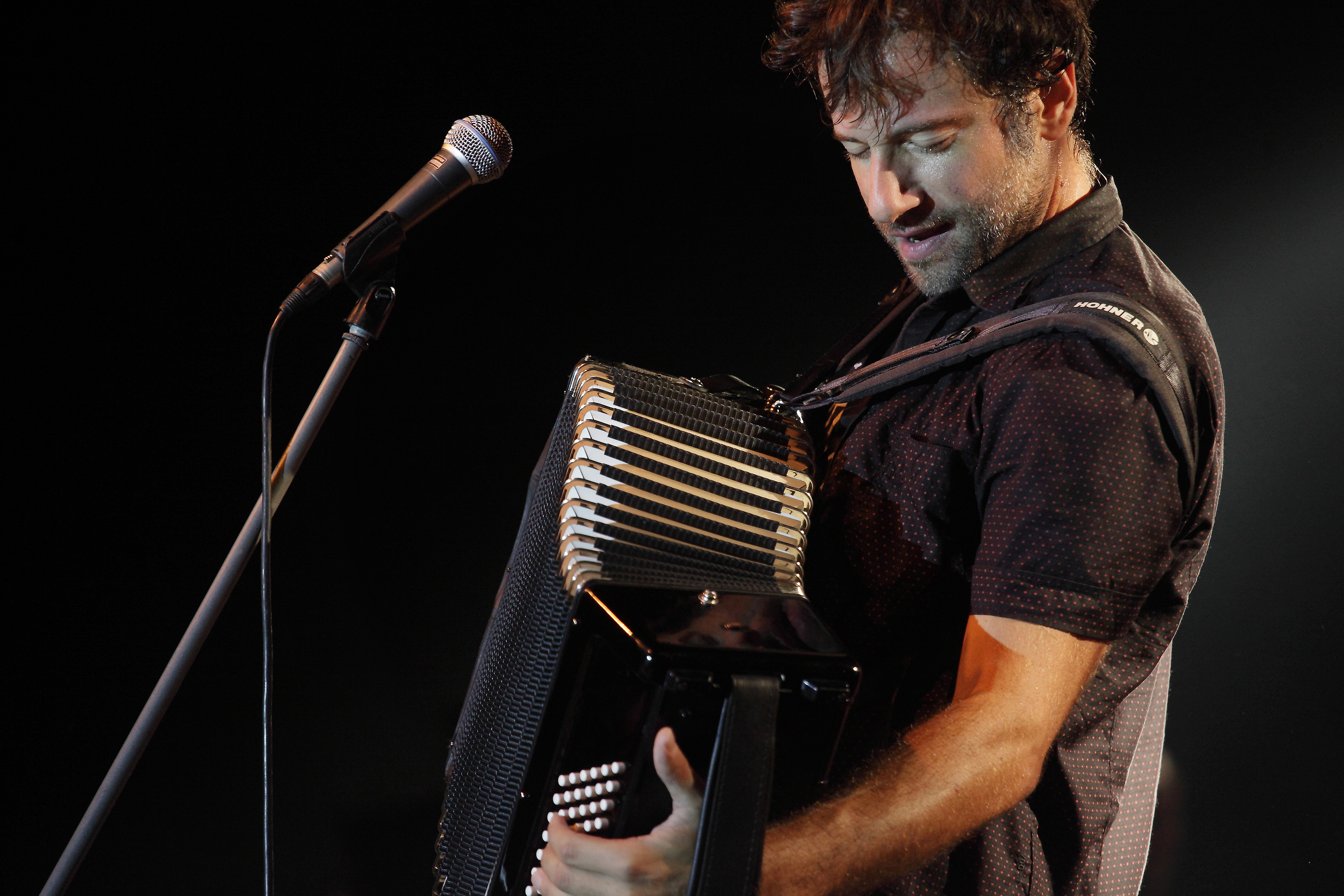
- Born: Konstantinos Maravegias; May 13, 1974 (age 52); Agrinio, Greece
- Style: Folk; folk pop
- Spouse: Tonia Sotiropoulou (2021-)
- Awards: Best Composer (2014); Best Duet (2011); Best Video Clip Alternative (2011)
- Website: www.maraveyas.net

Kostis Maraveyas or Kostis Maravegias (Greek: Κωστής Μαραβέγιας), also known by his stage name Maraveyas ilegál or just Maraveyas, is a Greek singer-songwriter, composer, performer, director, TV presenter and writer. He plays the accordion, piano, guitar, hammond, farfisa and he sings in Greek, English, Spanish and Italian. Although he began his musical career in the underground and alternative music scene of Italy and Greece, as of 2015 Maraveyas has reached wider audiences and is considered as a well known songwriter-performer in Greece.

From 2017 to 2019 he has been one of the four judges of the TV show The Voice of Greece, winning all three seasons with his team.

== Biography ==
Maraveyas began his musical career in Italy where he studied Statistics and Mathematics at the University of Bari, as well as piano, harmony, counterpoint and fugue at the Conservatory Niccolò Piccini of Bari. While there, he played with groups such as Yamas and X Darawish ("Una ratsa mia fatsa" ed. Il manifesto 1998), which combined various languages and musical styles. His music combines Mediterranean and Balkan elements, colorful arrangements and jazz and bossa nova influences. Maraveyas returned to Greece in 2001 as a solo artist. In 2003, he released his solo debut "Radiopiratis" (FM Records 2003). His second album "Maraveyas Ilegal" (Cantini 2007) came out in 2007 to positive reviews. His third release was "Welcome To Greece" (EMI 2009) and his fourth was "Lola" (EMI 2012). He has toured regularly with his live band in Greece and other European countries, such as United Kingdom, Germany, Austria, France, Netherlands, Italy and Belgium. Maraveyas Ilegál's live shows in Greece are often sold out.

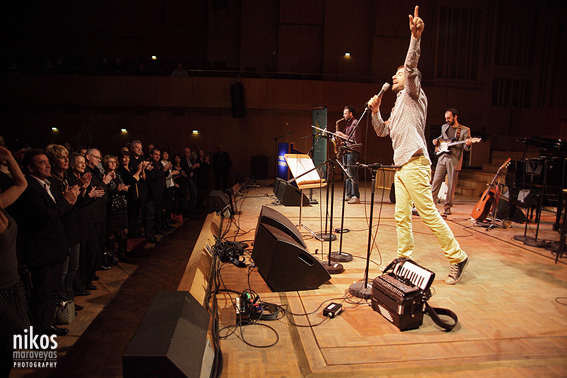
Maraveyas performing in Berlin at Prix Europa 2010

In 2010 Maraveyas performed during the opening night of Prix Europa organized by RBB in the Großen Sendesaal of RBB in Berlin, an annual European trimedial festival and competition. The song "Rue Madame" was premiered during that concert and a competition was launched for the video shoot, in collaboration with Dailymotion. It was the first worldwide director competition by a Greek artist.

His digital single "Fila Me Akoma" featuring Panos Mouzourakis, the Greek cover version of Lorenzo Jovanotti's "Baciami Ancora", has won 2 MAD Video Music Awards for Best Alternative Video and Best Duet, as well as nominated for Best Greek Act at the 2011 MTV Europe Music Awards.

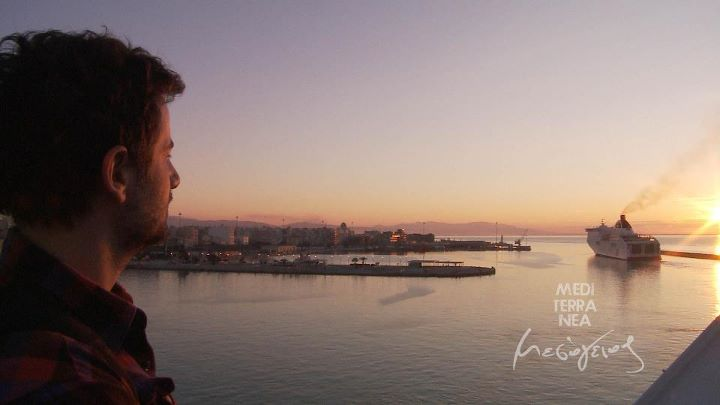
Maraveyas as host of "Mesogeios"

Maraveyas served as the host of the music documentary "Mesogeios" ("Mediterranean"), for the 2011/2012 television season, a production by Panos Karkanevatos for the Greek public television ERT. The documentary involved road trip to cities of the Mediterranean with Maraveyas exchanging ideas and sounds with local musicians as well as jamming with them. Featured musicians included Vinicio Capossela, Ludovico Einaudi, Riccardo Tesi, Orchestra Di Piazza Vittorio, RadioDervish, Mariza, Teresa Salgueiro, Cristina Branco, Deolinda, Cristina Hoyos, Amparo Sanchez, Macaco, Massilia Sound System, Psarantonis, Mercan Dede, Baba Zula, Yasmin Levy and others.

Maraveyas performing with Panos Mouzourakis in 2026.

In March 2012, Maraveyas published his first novel "Lola", which was released by Metaichmio editions as a part of a CD with the same title. The story is about a young musician named Lola and her boyfriend Markos.

In 2014 he wrote and directed 12 episodes of the music documentary series "Mousiki Pantou" (Greek: Μουσική Παντού) which was transmitted on Greek Public Television (NERIT) and gained positive reviews from the media. On 8 November 2014, Maraveyas was awarded as "Best Composer" at the Athinorama People's Choice Theatre Awards for the play "Filargyros" ("L’Avare/The Miser") by Molière that was performed at the National Theatre of Greece during the 2012–2013 season. In summer 2015, Maraveyas composed the music for the play Ecclesiazousae, Aristophanes, for the National Theatre of Greece.

In May 2016, he participated as a singer-songwriter in the French film "Voir du pays" which was awarded at the 69th edition of the Cannes Film Festival. In June 2016 he composed the music for the play "Monaksxa a lonely planet", for the Athens & Epidaurus Festival 2016.

From 2017 to 2019 he has been one of the four judges of the Greek version of the TV show The Voice (franchise), winning all three seasons with his team.

== Personal life ==
In October 2021 Maraveyas, married Greek actress Tonia Sotiropoulou.

== Discography ==
=== Albums ===
- Radiopiratis (FM records, 2003)
- Ilegal (Cantini, 2007)
- Welcome to Greece (ilegál productions & EMI Greece, 2009)
- Lola (ilegál productions & EMI Greece, 2012)
- Live ston Kipo tou Megarou (ilegál productions & EMI Greece, 2013)
- Katastroma (ilegál productions & EMI/Universal Greece, 2016)
- Portofino (ilegál productions & EMI/Universal Greece, 2023)

=== Singles ===
- Fila Me Akoma (Baciami Ancora) (digital single, EMI/Universal Greece, 2010)
- Rue Madame (digital single, EMI/Universal Greece, 2010)
- Partides (Live) (digital single, EMI/Universal Greece, 2013)
- Amore Mio (digital single, EMI/Universal Greece, 2015)
- Mila Mou Mono Mia Fora (digital single, EMI/Universal Greece, 2017)
- Mikropragmata (digital single, EMI/Universal Greece, 2018)
- Bella Giornata Oggi (digital single, EMI/Universal Greece, 2021)
- Rita (digital single, EMI/Universal Greece, 2021)
- Ksehasmeni Enilikiosi (digital single, EMI/Universal Greece, 2022)

=== Contributions ===
- Iptamenos Diskos – Panos Mouzourakis – (EMI Greece, 2011) ("Fila me akoma")

== Music for theatre ==
- Onassis Ta Thelo Ola (Pallas Theatre, 2019)
- To koritsi tou lykou (Theatre Neos Kosmos, 2017)
- Sherlock ena mystirio me noima (Gyalino Music Theatre of Athens, 2016)
- Monaksxà (Greek Festival, 2016)
- Ecclesiazousae, Aristophanes (National Theatre of Greece, 2015)
- Fotino Domatio (Gyalino Music Theatre of Athens, 2015)
- The Miser, Moliere (National Theatre of Greece, 2014)
- Aneraida (Dipethe Agriniou, 2005)

== Music for cinema ==
- Milky Way (2023, Mega Channel)
- Voir du pays, Delphine & Muriel Coulin (songs included: "Welcome to Greece", "Ase me na bo", "Lola", 2016)
- Amore Mio, Ch.Dimas (2015)
- I Klironomos, P.Fafoutis (2009)

== Awards ==
- Best Composer (L' Avare by Molière at the National Theatre of Greece, Athinorama People's Choice Theatre Awards, 2014)
- Best duet song (Fila me akoma, Mad Video Music Awards, 2011)
- Best alternative video clip (Fila me akoma, Mad Video Music Awards, 2011)
