= Themis Adamantidis =

Greek singer and songwriter

Themis Adamantidis Θέμης Αδαμαντίδης
- Born: 28 September 1957 (age 68); Kaisariani, Greece
- Genres: Laïko
- Occupation: Musician
- Instrument: Vocals
- Years active: 1972 – present

Themis Adamantidis (Greek: Θέμης Αδαμαντίδης; born 28 September 1957) is a Greek singer and songwriter. He released around two dozen full-length studio albums, on Columbia Records, Minos Records/EMI and WEA, but also on smaller labels.

== Discography ==
He released the following albums:

- 1980 – Αγάπησέ με
- 1982 – Πονάμε όσοι αγαπάμε
- 1982 – Τα Βοριαδάκια (Συμμετοχή)
- 1983 – Δεν ήσουν ένα όνειρο
- 1984 – Μια αλήθεια
- 1986 – Δεν τελειώνουνε οι νύχτες
- 1987 – Ακόμα σ΄αγαπώ
- 1988 – 100%
- 1989 – Η Φαντασία μου
- 1991 – Επιμένω γιατί σ΄αγαπώ
- 1992 – Καλώς όρισες κοντά μου
- 1993 – Φίλοι
- 1995 – Ερωτική διαδρομή
- 1996 – Απόλυτος έρωτας
- 1998 – Χρυσές Επιτυχίες
- 1999 – Βαβέλ
- 1999 – Μα που να πάω
- 2000 – Αξέχαστες Επιτυχίες
- 2000 – Πού βρίσκεσαι
- 2002 – 18 Μεγάλες Επιτυχίες
- 2002 – 2 Lp-1 Cd
- 2002 – Συνήθης Ύποπτος
- 2003 – Ζεϊμπέκικα
- 2004 – Best Of
- 2004 – Σώμα με σώμα
- 2005 – Γεννήθηκα να σ΄αγαπώ
- 2005 – Ματωμένα χείλη
- 2005 – Ο Στέλιος του Σεπτέμβρη
- 2006 – Σε πρώτο πλάνο
- 2007 – Τσιφτετέλια & Συρτά
- 2008 – 36 Μεγάλες Επιτυχίες
- 2008 – Δώδεκα φεγγάρια
- 2009 – Στα 9/8
- 2009 – Το Λαικό τραγούδι
- 2010 – Μα που να πάω (3 Cd)
- 2010 – Καράβια τα όνειρα μου
- 2011 – Θέμης Αδαμαντίδης (4 Cd)
