= Sotis Volanis =

Greek singer (born 1971)

Sotis Volanis Σωτης Βολάνης
- Also known as: Sotis Volanis
- Born: Sotiris Stavridis (Σωτήριος Σταυρίδης); 20 February 1971 (age 55)
- Origin: Akrolimni, Pella, Central Macedonia, Greece
- Genres: Contemporary laiko; Laiko
- Occupations: Singer; musician; songwriter
- Instruments: Vocals; piano
- Years active: 1984–present
- Labels: Vasipap; Real Music; Virus Music; Minos EMI

Sotis Volanis (Greek: Σώτης Βολάνης, born Sotiris Stavridis in 20 February 1971) is a Greek singer. He was born in Akrolimni, Pella, Greece.

He is best known for his 2002 success Poso Mou Leipei (i zesti ankalia sou) (Greek: Πόσο μου λείπει η ζεστή αγκαλιά σου), English How much I miss your warm hug.

Due to his great success the song has been covered several times:

- in Saudi Arabic by Inez Atili under the title My Love released in 2020
- in Levantine Arabic by Fadel Chaker under the title Ya ghayeb
- in Hebrew by Shlomi Saranga and Moshik Afia under the title Halom Matok (Sweet dream)
- in Hebrew duets with Sarit Hadad Tak-tak and Oxygena
- in Turkish by Serdar Ortaç as Beni unut
- in Serbian by Funky G as Gde si ti and Jelena Karleuša as Nisi u pravu
- in Bulgarian by Azis as Obicham Te and Magapasa as Kolko Mi Lipsvash
- in Romanian by Adrian Minune as Dragoste Fara Sfarsit
- in Albanian by Ermanda Durmishi Era as Dashuri e Pavdekshme

In his youth at the age of 13, he started to learn piano. In around 1984, he went to Düsseldorf to work as a piano player at the age of 14. He then moved to Munich, to Belgium and other countries. Upon his return to Thessaloniki in 1995, he began singing in different bouzoukia clubs -night clubs where Greek music is performed live‒ in provinces across Greece. Subsequently he went to Belgium where he was working daily. In 2000 he moved to Dubai, United Arab Emirates, where he was working as piano player and singer at a nightclub singing Greek songs. The lyrics and music for the song How much I miss your warm hug (Πόσο Μου Λείπει) where inspired from his stay there. In 2001, he released his first music single and his first music album shortly after, from the Vasipap record label located in Thessaloniki. The song’s success and popularity made him a famous singer across Greece.

In 2010, Sotis Volanis spoke openly about his troubles with alcoholism. He stated that he couldn't understand how it could have gone so far. The revelation of his alcohol problem was made at Alter Channel’s television show program Zamanfou presented by Annita Pania. He said "The reason why I started drinking is because I am an introverted person and do not express my feelings", and he promised "I would never take a sip ever again." The alcohol's negative health effects led him to seek treatment and, ultimately, to be able to successfully complete a rehabilitation. He has maintained his sobriety since 2014.

== Discography ==
=== Albums ===
- Sotis Volanis (2001)
- Sotis Volanis2 (2002)
- Orkoi Agapis (2003)
- Sotis Live (2004)
- Tak Tak (2005)
- Na M' Agapas (2007)
- Panselinos (2009)
- Po! Po! Po! (2010)
- Epistrefo Anevasmenos (2013)
- Emeis Ama Kollisoume De Tha Xekollisoume (2017)

=== Singles ===
- Sexokoritso (2011)
- Agapise Me (2012)
- Tha To Kano Ola Poutana (2012)
- Den Se Thelo Xana (2014)
- Matia Mou Latremena (2015)
- Venzini (2015)
- Kafes (2016)
- Pou Kai Pou Mataniono (2018)
- Na Me Proseheis (2019)
- Simera Agapaei (2019)
- Krata Me Sfihta (2019)
- Eho Vourkosei (2020)
- Tsigara Gkomenes Pota (2020)
- Megala Salonia Enfant Gate (2020)
- Oh Ti Glykia Pou Einai I Amartia (2020)
- Paraponaki Mou (2021)
- Pano Ap'Ola Se Goustaro (2022)

=== Duets ===
- Giati Na Mi Boroume Na Synnenoithoume (Fouli Tzelepi) (2020)
