= Paola (Greek singer) =

Greek singer

- Paola in 2010

Background information
- Born: Pagona Karamitsou; 25 June 1982 (age 44); Thessaloniki, Greece
- Occupation: Singer

Paola (born Pagona Karamitsou on 25 June 1982) is a Greek singer.

== Early life and career ==
Born on 25 June 1982 in Thessaloniki and raised in Sykia, Halkidiki. Ηer parents, Alexandros and Maria, were also musicians. She has an older brother Pericles. Paola began singing at 14 years old at the suggestion of a shopkeeper and with the approval of her parents. At 19, she was singing in the nightclub Mamounia in Thessaloniki.

== Career ==
In 2005 she published her first album, Silent, and then moved to Athens to work with Stamatis Gonidis. In 2007 she worked with Sotis Volanis on a duet titled "Grandma and Grandpa" which enjoyed great success. In 2008 she released her second album, "We went with red." In 2012, she released the album "Be One With me" which went gold with tracks including Be With Me One, Fault, Be quiet m'afiseis want, Artificial, What catches. On 24 April 2013 she released the album "After The Midnight" which went platinum within three days. In December 2013, she released the album The Truth Alone containing the successful songs: Hold On, Finished Statements Zero. Hold On was the 10th biggest radio hit of 2013. On 17 November 2014 she released the new song I A Life, foreshadowing the next disc I hide vagrancy, released in early 2015. The songs that stood out from this disc are: I A Life, These I said God, How Many Times, Cold Embrace.

== Personal life ==
On 8 April 2003 she gave birth to a daughter, Paolina.

== Discography ==
- Athoryva (Silent), 2005
- Perasame me kokkino (We Went with Red), 2008
- Gine mazi mou ena (Be One with Me), 2012
- Meta ta mesanihta (live)
- H moni alitheia
- Krivo alitia

== Filmography ==
=== Television ===
Year	Title	Role(s)	Notes
2005	Tell me yes	Herself	1 episode
2010	Somewhere else awaken	Herself	3 episodes
2011	The life of the other woman	Herself	2 episodes
2012	MAD Video Music Awards	Herself (performance)	TV special
2013	MadWalk - The Fashion Music Project	Herself (performance)	TV special
2014	MAD Video Music Awards	Herself (performance)	TV special
2020	At Home with MEGA with Paola	Herself (host)	Episode 9; season 2
2023	Night at Rythmos	Herself (co-host)	Episode: "Paola & Angela Dimitriou"
2026-present	The Voice of Greece	Herself (coach)	Season 12

=== Music videos ===
Year	Music video	Artist	Notes
2010	Pseftika	Herself	
2012	Na Me Afiseis Isichy Thelo	Herself	
2012	Gine Mazi Mou Ena	Herself	
2013	Krata Me	Herself	
2014	Eho Mia Zoi	Herself	
2015	Poses Fores	Herself	
