= Eleni Foureira discography =

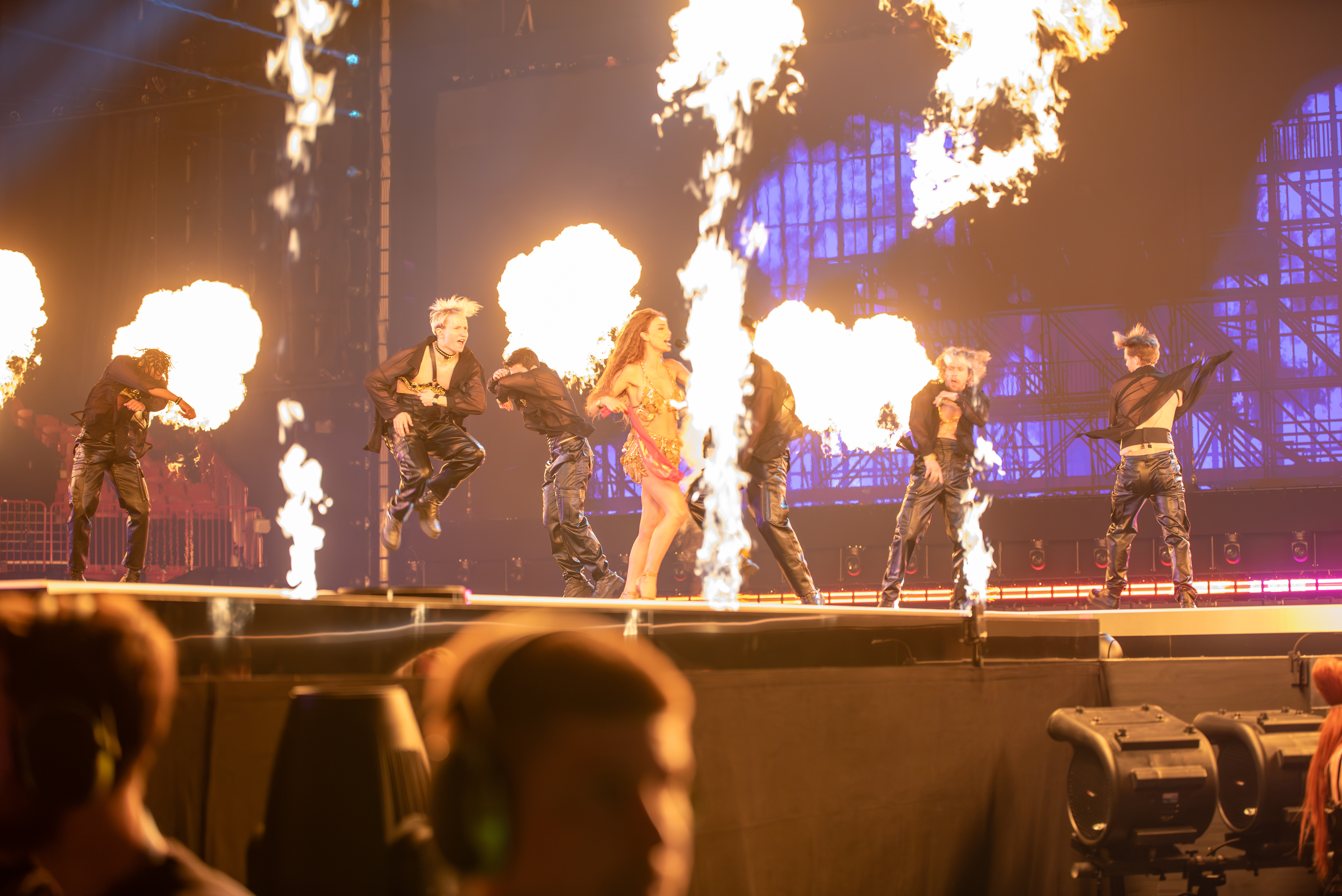
- Foureira performing in 2024
- Studio albums: 6
- EPs: 1
- Singles: 96
- Music videos: 50

The discography of the Albanian-born Greek singer Eleni Foureira consists of six studio albums, one extended-play, thirty-five singles (including six as a featured artist) and 50 music videos.

== Albums ==
Title	Details	Peak chart positions	Sales	Certifications (sales thresholds)
Title	Details	GRE	Sales	Certifications (sales thresholds)
Eleni Foureira	Released: 13 December 2010; Label: Universal Music Greece; Formats: CD, Digital download	1	GRE: 12,000	GRE: Platinum
Ti Poniro Mou Zitas	Released: 26 June 2012; Label: Minos EMI; Formats: CD, Digital download	7		
Anemos Agapis	Released: 21 December 2014; Label: Minos EMI; Formats: CD, Digital download	3		
Vasilissa	Released: 9 December 2017; Label: Panik Records; Formats: CD, Digital download	1	GRE: 15,000	GRE: Platinum
Poli Ploki	Released: 3 June 2022 (Note: The album was re-released on November 14, 2022 after physicals arrived.); Label: Panik Records; Formats: CD, Digital download	1		GRE: Diamond
Hybrid	Release: 24 October 2025; Label: Panik Records; Formats: Digital download (music)	1 https://www.ifpi.gr/charts_el.html		

== Reissues ==
Title	Details	Peak chart positions GRE
Vasilissa (Platinum Edition)	Released: 13 December 2018; Label: Panik Records; Formats: CD, digital download	1
Poli_Ploki (Deluxe Edition)	Released: 8 April 2024; Label: Panik Records; Formats: Digital download	

== Extended plays ==
Title	Details
Gypsy Woman	Released: 17 May 2019; Label: Panik Records; Formats: Digital download

== Singles ==
=== As lead artist ===
Title	Year	Peak chart positions										Certifications	Album
Title	Year	GRE	AUT	BUL Air.	IRE	NLD	NOR	SPA	SWE	SWI	UK	Certifications	Album
"To 'Cho (Pom Pom)"	2010	8	—	—	—	—	—	—	—	—	—		Eleni Foureira
"Mia Nychta Mono" (featuring Thirio)	2010	7	—	—	—	—	—	—	—	—	—		Eleni Foureira
"Ase Me"	2011	14	—	—	—	—	—	—	—	—	—		Eleni Foureira
"Paixe Mazi Mou" (with Ciprian Rodu)	2011	—	—	—	—	—	—	—	—	—	—		Ti Poniro Mou Zitas
"Reggaeton"	2011	6	—	—	—	—	—	36	—	—	—		Ti Poniro Mou Zitas
"Pio Erotas Pethaineis"	2012	6	—	—	—	—	—	—	—	—	—		Ti Poniro Mou Zitas
"Radevou Sti Paralia"	2013	—	—	—	—	—	—	—	—	—	—		Anemos Agapis
"Anemos Agapis"	2014	20	—	—	—	—	—	—	—	—	—		Anemos Agapis
"Party Sleep Repeat (PSR)"	2014	—	—	—	—	—	—	—	—	—	—		Anemos Agapis
"Vazo Tin Kardia"	2014	11	—	—	—	—	—	—	—	—	—		Anemos Agapis
"Mou Pan Ι Agapi"	2014	—	—	—	—	—	—	—	—	—	—		Anemos Agapis
"Pio Dinata"	2015	32	—	—	—	—	—	—	—	—	—		Vasilissa
"Sto Theo Me Paei"	2015	9	—	—	—	—	—	—	—	—	—		Vasilissa
"Den Sou Xrostao Agapi"	2016	18	—	—	—	—	—	—	—	—	—		Vasilissa
"Ti Koitas" (featuring MIKE)	2016	3	—	—	—	—	—	—	—	—	—		Vasilissa
"2017 S' Agapo"	2016	7	—	—	—	—	—	—	—	—	—		Non-album single
"Mono Gia Sena"	2017	11	—	—	—	—	—	—	—	—	—		Vasilissa
"To Kati Pou Echeis"	2017	11	—	—	—	—	—	—	—	—	—		Vasilissa
"Vasilissa"	2017	6	—	—	—	—	—	—	—	—	—		Vasilissa
"2018 S' Agapo"	2017	20	—	—	—	—	—	—	—	—	—		Vasilissa
"Fuego"	2018	1	35	—	50	96	16	9	14	46	64	GLF: Gold; IFPI NOR: Gold; PROMUSICAE: 2× Platinum	Vasilissa (Platinum Edition)
"Caramela"	2018	1	—	—	—	—	—	—	—	—	—		Vasilissa (Platinum Edition)
"Tómame"	2018	1	—	—	—	—	—	—	—	—	—		Non-album singles
"2019 S' Agapo"	2018	14	—	—	—	—	—	—	—	—	—		Vasilissa (Platinum Edition)
"Triumph"	2019	9	—	—	—	—	—	—	—	—	—		Non-album singles
"El Ritmo Psicodélico"	2019	5	—	—	—	—	—	—	—	—	—		Gypsy Woman
"Loquita" (with Claydee)	2019	1	—	—	—	—	—	—	—	—	—		Non-album singles
"2020 S' Agapo"	2019	10	—	—	—	—	—	—	—	—	—		Non-album singles
"Yayo"	2020	3	—	—	—	—	—	—	—	—	—		Non-album singles
"Temperatura"	2020	10	—	—	—	—	—	—	—	—	—		Non-album singles
"Light It Up"	2020	26	—	—	—	—	—	—	—	—	—		Non-album singles
"Dokimase Me"	2020	14	—	—	—	—	—	—	—	—	—		Non-album singles
"Mporei" (with Mad Clip)	2021	1	—	—	—	—	—	—	—	—	—	GRE: Diamond	Poli Ploki
"Aeraki (To Thiliko)"	2021	1	—	—	—	—	—	—	—	—	—	GRE: 2× Platinum	Poli Ploki
"Fotiá" (with Evangelia)	2021	3	—	—	—	—	—	—	—	—	—	GRE: Platinum	Poli Ploki
"Poli Ploki"	2022	30	—	—	—	—	—	—	—	—	—	GRE: Gold	Poli Ploki
"El Telephone" (with Dj Bobito and Ayman)	2022	1	—	—	—	—	—	—	—	—	—	GRE: 2× Platinum	Poli Ploki
"Egw & Esy" (with Trannos)	2022	1	—	—	—	—	—	—	—	—	—	GRE: Platinum	Poli_Ploki (Deluxe Edition)
"Aya" (featuring Hawk)	2022	3	—	—	—	—	—	—	—	—	—	GRE: Platinum	Poli Ploki
"El Telephone (Remix)" (with Mente Fuerte, Trannos, Fy, Dj Bobito, Ayman)	2022	1	—	—	—	—	—	—	—	—	—	GRE: 4× Platinum	Poli_Ploki (Deluxe Edition)
"Sigkinitika Sigkinithika"	2022	12	—	—	—	—	—	—	—	—	—	GRE: Gold	Poli Ploki
"Oh Mami" (with MC Daddy)	2023	5	—	6	—	—	—	—	—	—	—	GRE: Platinum	Poli_Ploki (Deluxe Edition)
"Kolima" (with Display)	2023	9	—	—	—	—	—	—	—	—	—	GRE: Platinum	Poli_Ploki (Deluxe Edition)
"Gdysou" (with Apon)	2023	5	—	—	—	—	—	—	—	—	—	GRE: Diamond	Poli_Ploki (Deluxe Edition)
"Our Groove" (with Playmen & AD-1 )	2024	—	—	—	—	—	—	—	—	—	—		
"Alleluia" (with ARCADE)	2025	5 (Note: "Alleluia" also hit number one on the Greek Airplay chart.)	—	—	—	—	—	—	—	—	—	GRE: Gold	Hybrid
"—" denotes a release that did not chart or was not released in that territory.

=== As featured artist ===
Title	Year	Peak chart positions		Album
Title	Year	GRE	ALB	Album
"I Kivotos Tou Noe (Noah's Ark)" (Manos Pirovolakis featuring Eleni Foureira & Don't Ask)	2010	—	—	Non-album single
"Chica Bomb (Remix)" (Dan Balan featuring Eleni Foureira)	2010	—	—	Eleni Foureira
"To Party De Stamata" (Midenistis featuring Eleni Foureira)	2012	3	—	Ti Poniro Mou Zitas
"Tranquila*" (J Balvin featuring Eleni Foureira)	2014	1	—	Anemos Agapis
"Delicious" (Butrint Imeri featuring Eleni Foureira)	2016	—	5	Non-album single
"Send for Me" (A.M. SNiPER featuring Eleni Foureira and Afro B)	2017	5	—	Vasilissa
"Sirens**" (Kaan featuring Snoop Dogg and Eleni Foureira)	2019	4	—	Non-album singles
"Μadame" (Kings, Trannos featuring Eleni Foureira)	2022	—	—	Non-album singles
"—" denotes a recording that did not chart or was not released in that territory.

- 1. Tranquila feat. Eleni Foureira charted in Latin America in the following spots; Mexico #74, Chile #122, Argentina #138, Peru #141, Ecuador #150.
  - 2. Sirens feat. Snoop Dogg & Eleni Foureira charted in the International iTunes Chart #132, as well as Germany #18 & Austria #44.

=== Promotional singles ===
Title	Year	Peak chart positions	Album
Title	Year	GRE	Album
"Pes To Kathara" (with Vasilis Karras)	2014	—	Anemos Agapis
"Allo Level" (with Lil Barty)	2019	23	Non-album single
"Mono Esy Kai Ego" (with Konstantinos Argiros)	2022	65	Poli Ploki and 22
"—" denotes a recording that did not chart or was not released in that territory.

=== Other charted and certified songs ===
Title	Year	Peak chart positions	Certifications	Album
Title	Year	GRE	Certifications	Album
"All I Need" (featuring Loud)	2012	—		Ti Poniro Mou Zitas
"Fotia" (featuring NEVMA)	2012	—		Non-album single
"To Deserve You"	2013	—		Anemos Agapis
"Ladies (Stand Up)"	2015	—		Vasilissa
"Pio Dinata (Remix)" (with Giannis Zissis)	2015	—		Non-album single
"Come Tiki Tam"	2016	—		Vasilissa
"Follow The Sunrise"	2017	—		Vasilissa
"Gigi In Paradisco"	2018	—		Non-album single
"Fuego (Spanish Version)"	2018	—		Vasilissa
"Fuego (Playmen Festival Remix)" (with Playmen)	2018	—		Vasilissa
"Caramela (English Version)"	2018			Non-album single
"Gypsy Woman (La-Da-Dee)"	2019	39		Gypsy Woman
"Call Ya"	2019	33		Gypsy Woman
"Barcelona"	2019	32		Gypsy Woman
"Maria"	2019	45		Gypsy Woman
"Temperatura (Spanish Version)"	2020	—		Non-album singles
"Yayo (Acoustic Version)"	2020	—		Non-album singles
"Temperatura (Themis G Mix)" (with Themis G.)	2021	—		Non-album singles
"Dokimase Me (Sergio T. & Mr. SPa Remix)" (with Sergio T. and Mr. SPa)	2021	—		Non-album singles
"Dokimase Me (V.Koutonias & D. Telkis Remix)" (with V.Koutonias and D. Telkis)	2021	—		Non-album singles
"Perder Control" (with Evangelia)	2022	—		Non-album singles
"Xereis I Eleni"	2022	76	GRE: Gold	Poli_Ploki
"Ohi"	2022	98		Poli_Ploki
"Den Kano Ego Sto Spiti"	2025	13		Hybrid

== Videos ==
=== Music Videos ===
Title	Year	Director(s)
"To 'Cho (Pom Pom)"	2010	Konstantinos Rigos
"Mia Nychta Mono"	2010	Vangelis Tsaousopoulos
"Ase Me"	2011	Vangelis Tsaousopoulos
"Reggaeton"	2011	Yiannis Papadakos & Dimitris Platanias
"To Party De Stamata"	2012	Yiannis Papadakos & Dimitris Platanias
"Stou Erota Tin Trela"	2012	Apollon Papatheocharis
"Pio Erotas Pethaineis"	2013	Apollon Papatheocharis
"Sweetest Love"	2013	Apollon Papatheocharis
Anemos Agapis	2014	Apollon Papatheocharis
"Party Sleep Repeat (PSR)"	2014	Apollon Papatheocharis
"Mou Pan I Agapi"	2014	Yiannis Papadakos
"Pio Dynata"	2015	Black Mamba
"Sto Theo Me Paei"	2015	Yiannis Papadakos
"Den Sou Xrostao Agapi"	2016	Yiannis Papadakos
"Ti Koitas"	2016	Sherif Francis
"2017 S'Agapo"	2016	Yiannis Papadakos
"Mono Gia Sena"	2017	Black Mamba
"To Kati Pou Echeis"	2017	Sherif Francis
"Send for Me" (A.M. SNiPER feat. Eleni Foureira and Afro B)	2017	A.M. SNiPER & Huge-G
"Vasilissa"	2017	Yiannis Papadakos
"2018 S'Agapo"	2017	Yannis Papadakos
"Fuego"	2018	Apollon Papatheocharis
"Caramela (Greek Version)"	2018	Pierros Andrakakos
"Tómame"	2018	Yannis Dimolitsas
"Tómame (Choreography Video)"	2018	George Mpenioudakis
"Triumph"	2019	Yannis Dimolitsas
"Sirens" (Kaan featuring Snoop Dogg and Eleni Foureira)	2019	PickCodes & Harris Hodovic
"Loquita" (with Claydee)	2019	Yiannis Papadakos
"Allo Level"	2019	Crystal View
"Yayo"	2020	Yannis Dimolitsas
"Temperatura (Greek Version)"	2020	Yannis Dimolitsas
"Light It Up"	2020	Giannis Michelopoulos
"Mporei" (Mad Clip with Eleni Foureira)	2021	George Mpenioudakis
"Aeraki (To Thiliko)"	2021	George Mpenioudakis
"Fotiá (Greek Version)" (Evangelia and Eleni Foureira)	2021	George Mpenioudakis
"Poli_Ploki (Promo Videos)"	2022	Yannis Dimolitsas
"Poli_Ploki"	2022	Yannis Dimolitsas
"Aya" (Eleni Foureira featuring Hawk)	2022	George Mpenioudakis
"Egw & Esy" (Trannos and Eleni Foureira)	2022	Manos Makrakis
"El Telephone (Remix)" (Eleni Foureira with Mente Fuerte, Trannos, Fy, Dj Bobito, Ayman)	2022	Yannis Dimolitsas
"Sigkinitika Sigkinithika"	2022	Tasos Chatzis, Petros Nikolintais
"Oh Mami" (Eleni Foureira feat. MC Daddy)	2023	Yannis Dimolitsas
"Kolima" (with Display)	2023	Yannis Dimolitsas
"Gdysou" (with Apon)	2023	Yannis Dimolitsas
"Aeroplano Remix" (with Fy)	2024	Giannis Michelopoulos
"10" (with Saske)	2024	George Mpenioudakis
"Boro Ki Ego" (with Mastoras)	2025	Yiannis Dimolitsas
"Burnout" (with Duska)	2025	Eleni Foureira & Katerina Duska
"Alleluia"	2025	Yiannis Dimolitsas
“Den Kano Ego Gia Spiti”	2026	

=== Lyric Videos ===
Title	Year	Artist	Album
Vazo Tin Kardia	2014	Eleni Foureira	Anemos Agapis
Mou 'Pan I Agapi	2014	Eleni Foureira	Anemos Agapis
Ladies (Stand Up)	2015	Eleni Foureira	Vasilissa
Pio Dynata	2015	Eleni Foureira	Vasilissa
Sto Theo Me Paei	2015	Eleni Foureira	Vasilissa
Pio Dynata (Giannis Zissis Official Remix)	2015	Eleni Foureira + Giannis Zissis	Non-album single
O Tropos	2015	Boys & Noise feat. Eleni Foureira	Tainia Fantasias
Ti Koitas	2016	Eleni Foureira feat. MIKE	Vasilissa
Fuego (Spanish Version)	2018	Eleni Foureira	Vasilissa (Platinum Edition)
2019 S'agapo	2018	Eleni Foureira	Non-album single
El Ritmo Psicodélico	2019	Eleni Foureira	Gypsy Woman
2020 S'agapo	2019	Eleni Foureira	Non-album single
Temperatura (Spanish Version)	2020	Eleni Foureira	Non-album single
Dokimase Me	2020	Eleni Foureira	Non-album single
Truth or Dare	2025	Eleni Foureira & Juan Magan & Brando	Non-Album Single

== Live performances ==
Title	Year	Event	Album
Chica Bomb (Remix) (Dan Balan featuring Eleni Foureira)	2010	MAD Video Music Awards	Eleni Foureira
Pexe Mazi Mou (Fun - O Eh A) (Ciprian Robu featuring Eleni Foureira)	2011	MAD Video Music Awards	Ti Poniro Mou Zitas
"All I Need" (with LOUD)	2012	MADWalk	Ti Poniro Mou Zitas
Fotia (Eleni Foureira featuring NEBMA)	2012	MAD Video Music Awards	Non-album single
Wild Dances (Eurosong 2013) (with Ruslana)	2013	Eurosong - A MAD Show	Non-album single
Toxic	2013	MADWalk	Non-album single
To Deserve You (Alex Leon Remix)	2013	MADWalk	Anemos Agapis
Oneiro Zo / Den tairiazete sou leo (Pantelis Pantelidis featuring Eleni Foureira & Stan)	2013	MAD Video Music Awards	Non-album single
"Radevou Sti Paralia / Congo" (with X)	2013	MAD Video Music Awards	Non-album single
Tranquila (with J Balvin)	2014	MAD Video Music Awards	Anemos Agapis
Ladies (Stand Up)	2015	MADWalk	Vasilissa
Sto Theo Me Paei	2015	MAD Video Music Awards	Vasilissa
Who / Habibi (Claydee, Faydee, Bo featuring Eleni Foureira)	2015	MAD Video Music Awards	Non-album single
Den Sou Xrostao Agapi	2016	MADWalk	Vasilissa
Sto Theo Me Paei x Ego (Ale Ale Ale)	2016	MADWalk Cyprus	Non-album single
Taste The Feeling (with Konstantinos Angelopoulos & Anastasios Rammos)	2016	MAD Video Music Awards	Non-album single
Ti Koitas (featuring MIKE)	2016	MAD Video Music Awards	Vasilissa
Follow the Sunrise	2017	MADWalk	Vasilissa
To Kati Pou Eheis	2017	MAD Video Music Awards	Vasilissa
To Kati Pou Eheis	2017	SMA Cyprus	Vasilissa
Gigi In Paradisco	2018	MADWalk	Non-album single
Fuego ESC 2018 semi-final	2018	Eurovision Song Contest 2018	Vasilissa (Platinum Edition)
Fuego ESC 2018 final	2018	Eurovision Song Contest 2018	Vasilissa (Platinum Edition)
Fuego	2018	SMA Cyprus	Vasilissa (Platinum Edition)
Fuego Playmen Festival Remix	2018	MAD Video Music Awards	Vasilissa (Platinum Edition)
Caramela x Demasiado Corazon (featuring 719)	2018	MAD Video Music Awards	Non-album single
Fuego, Pexe Mazi Mou (Fun - O Eh A), Swish Swish, Mono Gia Sena, Anywhere, One Kiss, No Tears Left To Cry, Lo malo, X, Gigi In Paradisco, Havana, Conga, Let's Get Loud, Reggaeton, Tranquila	2018	Barcelona Pride	Various
Fuego	2018	Madrid Pride	Various
Fuego	2018	Stockholm Pride	Various
Fuego	2018	Amsterdam Pride	Various
Fuego, Caramela (English Version), X, Tranquila	2018	RIX FM Festival Gothenburg	Various
Fuego	2018	LOS40 Music Awards 2018	Vasilissa (Platinum Edition)
Tómame*	2018	Feliz 2019!	Non-album single
Fuego x Tómame	2019	Söngvakeppnin 2019	Non-album single
Gypsy Woman	2019	MADWalk	Gypsy Woman (EP)
Switch Song (ESC 2019 interval act) (with Conchita Wurst, Måns Zelmerlöw, Verka Serduchka, and Gali Atari)	2019	Eurovision Song Contest 2019	Non-album single
El Ritmo Psicodélico x Gasolina (featuring 2J)	2019	MAD Video Music Awards	Non-album single
Fuego x Tómame	2019	SMA Cyprus	Non-album single
Fuego	2019	Het Grote Songfestivalfeest	Vasilissa (Platinum Edition)
Fuego, Dokimase Me, Light It Up, El Ritmo Psicodélico, Loquita, Caramela	2020	Just the 2 of Us	Various
Dokimase Me	2021	MAD Video Music Awards	Non-album single
Light It Up feat. Chraja x Super C*unterines	2021	MAD Video Music Awards	Non-album single
Light It Up x Gimme! Gimme! Gimme! (A Man After Midnight)	2021	MAD Walk	Non-album single
Yayo x Streets (Silhoutte Remix) x Reggaeton x Ti Koitas x El Ritmo Psicodélico x Tranquila Remix x Loquita x MONTERO (Call Me By Your Name) x Pio Erotas Pethenis x Sto Theo Me Paei x Mporei x Caramela x Seven Nation Army and Dokimase Me Mashup x Light It Up and Levitating (song) Mashup x Rhythm Nation x Zitti e buoni x Fuego	2021	House of Fame (Final)	Various
Aeraki (To Thiliko)	2021	MAD Video Music Awards	Poli Ploki
El Ritmo Psicodélico x Fuego x Sirens x Caramela	2021	Greece's Next Top Model	Non-album single
