= Hybrid (Eleni Foureira album) =

Studio album by Eleni Foureira
- Released: 24 October 2025
- Genre: Pop, Greek Pop
- Length: 36:35
- Language: Greek, English
- Label: Panik Records
- Producer: ARCADE, Beyond, Alex Leon, Koumentakos, Ripen

Eleni Foureira chronology
Poli Ploki (2022)	Hybrid (2025)

Singles from Hybrid
- 1. "Alleluia" Released: 17 October 2025; 2. "Den Kano Ego Gia Spiti" Released: 4 February 2026; 3. "Xronia Polla" Released: 7 March 2026

Hybrid is the sixth studio album by Greek singer Eleni Foureira. The album was released on streaming services on October 24, 2025, by Panik Records. The album collected more than one million international streams in its first day on Spotify. Foureira stated that the name "Hybrid" comes from the perspective that the album is different from her previous work and she explored new elements of herself; and each song has its own story to tell.

On the album she worked with long-term collaborators Alex Leon (To Deserve You Remix), ARCADE ( El Ritmo Psicodélico, Aristourgima), and Marios Psimopoulos (Sigkinitika Sigkinithika, Reggaeton) while also working with Daphne Lawrence and Ripen for the first time.

== Singles ==
he album first single was "Alleluia'', was released on 17 October 2025 with a music video later released on November 24. The second video clip ''Den Kano Ego Gia Spiti'' came out on 4 February 2026.

== Track listing ==
Standard edition
No.	Title	Writer(s)	Producer(s)	Length
1.	"Alleluia"	ARCADE	ARCADE	3:48
2.	"Den Kano Ego Gia Spiti"	Foureira, ARCADE	ARCADE	3:01
3.	"Eleftheri Sxesi"	Erection Music	Alex Leon, Erection Music	2:54
4.	"Giati Etsi Goustaro"	Foureira, ARCADE	ARCADE	2:38
5.	"Toxiko"	ARCADE	ARCADE	2:32
6.	"Give Me A Kiss"	ARCADE	ARCADE	2:17
7.	"O Ixos Tis Kardias"	APON	IAMSTRONG	2:45
8.	"Ipirotiko Ntouz"	Foureira, Marios Psimopoulos	Marios Psimopoulos, Piesel	2:40
9.	"Peistiki"	Foureira, Daphne Lawrence, Vasilis Koumentakos, Ripen	Vasilis Koumentakos	3:25
10.	"Bam Kai Kato" (featuring Daphne Lawrence)	Daphne Lawrence, Ripen	Ripen	2:22
11.	"To Poto"	Foureira, Alex Leon	Alex Leon	2:03
12.	"100%" (with Beyond)	Beyond, VIDO, Sin Laurent, Daphne Lawrence	Beyond	2:57
13.	"Xronia Polla"	Foureira, Daphne Lawrence, Vasilis Koumentakos, Ripen	Vasilis Koumentakos	3:07
Total length:				36:35

== Release history ==
Release history for Hybrid
Region	Edition	Release date	Format	Tracks	Label
Various	Standard	24 October 2025	Digital download; streaming	13	Panik
Various	Standard	29 April 2026	CD & Vinyl		

== Music Videos ==
Song	Release date	Director
Alleluia (Short Film)	24 November 2025	Yiannis Dimolitsas
Den Kano Ego Gia Spiti	4 February 2026	Yiannis Dimolitsas
Xronia Polla	7 March 2026	Yiannis Dimolitsas
