= Eleni Foureira =

Greek singer (born 1987)

Eleni Foureira Ελένη Φουρέιρα
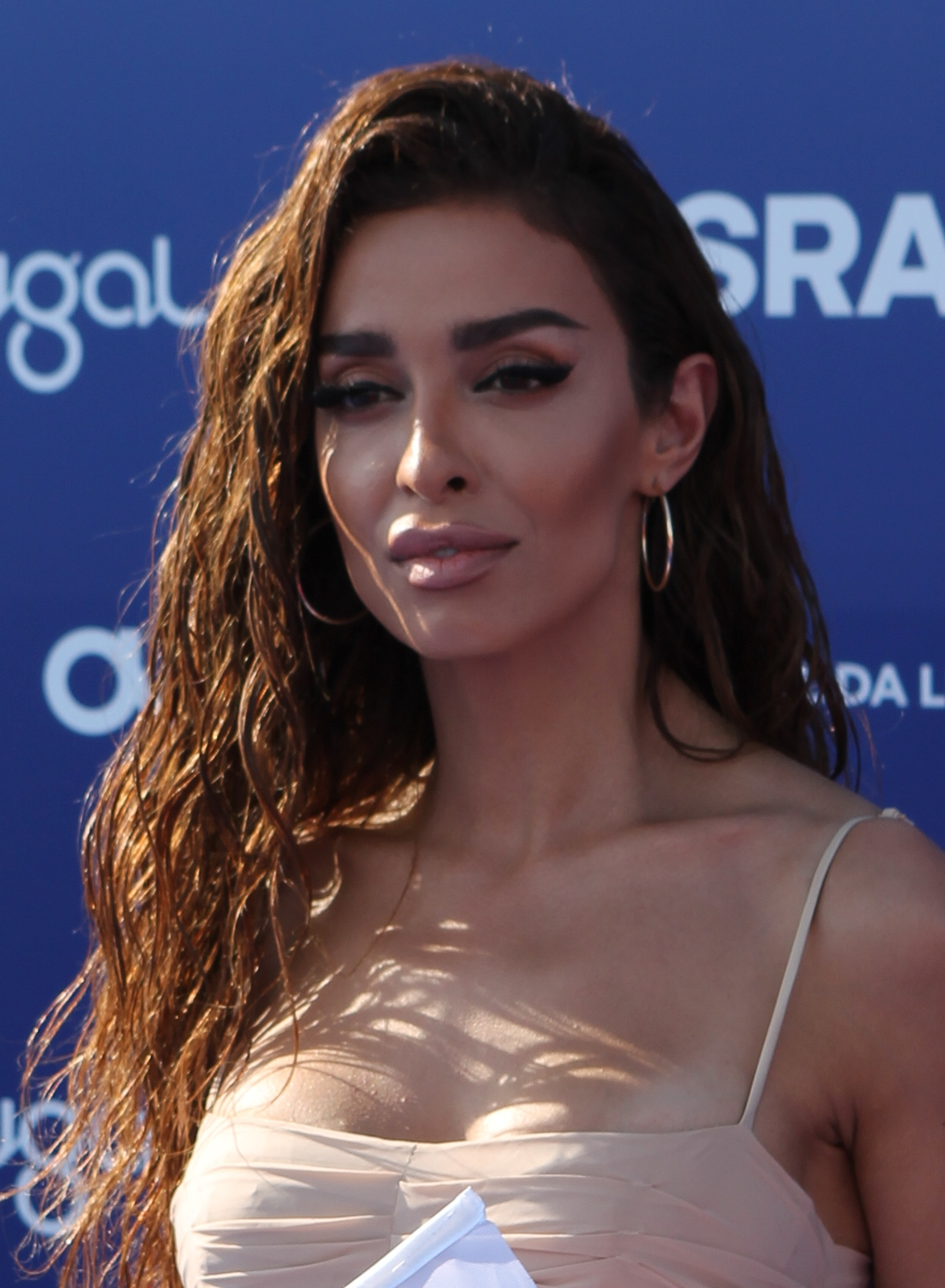
- Foureira in May 2018

Background information
- Born: Entela Fureraj; 7 March 1987 (age 39); Fier, Albania
- Origin: Athens, Greece
- Genres: Pop
- Occupation: Singer
- Instrument: Vocals
- Works: Discography
- Years active: 2007–present
- Labels: Universal Music Greece; Minos EMI; Panik Records; Sony Music
- Formerly of: Mystique
- Partner: Alberto Botía (2017–present)
- Website: elenifoureira.gr

Eleni Foureira (Greek: Ελένη Φουρέιρα; born Entela Fureraj, Greek: Εντέλα Φουρεράι; 7 March 1987) is an Albanian-born Greek singer. She began her music career in 2007 as a member of the Greek girl group Mystique, pursuing a solo career after the group disbanded in 2009. She has released six studio albums since.

Foureira signed a solo contract with Universal Music Greece and released her self-titled debut album in 2010. She later signed with Minos EMI, and went on to release her second and third studio albums Ti Poniro Mou Zitas and Anemos Agapis in 2012 and 2014, respectively. Both albums were well-received in Greece and Cyprus. Foureira left Minos EMI in 2015, and signed with Panik Records. Her fourth studio album Vasilissa was released in December 2017.

After being rejected several times in her efforts to represent Greece, Foureira represented Cyprus in the Eurovision Song Contest 2018 with the song "Fuego". She was one of three ethnically Albanian competitors. On 8 May 2018, she qualified from the first semi-final to the grand final, where she finished second with 436 points, thereby achieving Cyprus' best Eurovision result to date.

In 2019, Foureira released the EP Gypsy Woman, followed in 2020 by the release of singles "Yayo", "Temperatura" and "Light It Up". In 2021, she hosted the Greek talent show House of Fame - La Academia at Skai TV. Afterwards, she collaborated with Greek rapper MadClip on the song "Mporei", which became one of the biggest hits of the year in Greece. The song "Aeraki (To Thiliko)" followed with similar success. On 3 June 2022, she released her fifth studio album, called Poli_Ploki.

In 2024, it was confirmed at the event of the Diamond certification of the deluxe edition of her album Poli_Ploki – first album by a woman artist in the country to reach this certification – that Foureira is the most streamed woman from Greece.

On 24 October 2025, she released her sixth studio album, called Hybrid.

== Early life ==
Eleni Foureira was born Entela Fureraj on 7 March 1987 in Fier, then part of the People's Socialist Republic, present Albania. Her mother is a seamstress, while her father works in construction. She has three siblings: Ioanna, Margarita, and Giorgos. Foureira grew up in the Eastern Orthodox faith, and has a grandfather who was from Greece. When she was four years old, the family moved to the city of Vlorë, and later moved to Greece due to the 1997 Albanian civil unrest. Upon arriving in Greece, Foureira and her family settled in Athens.

Foureira began pursuing music at a young age, learning how to play the guitar and later working in a theatre for three years.

== Career ==
=== 2007–2009: Early career and Mystique ===
Foureira began her music career as a member of the girl group Mystique. She was discovered by Andreas Giatrakos, and the group also consisted of Alkmini Chatzigianni and Maria Makri. They released their debut single "Se alli selida" in 2007, and later achieved success with the single "Min kaneis pos de thymasai" featuring Greek hip hop group NEVMA the following year. They broke up in 2009.

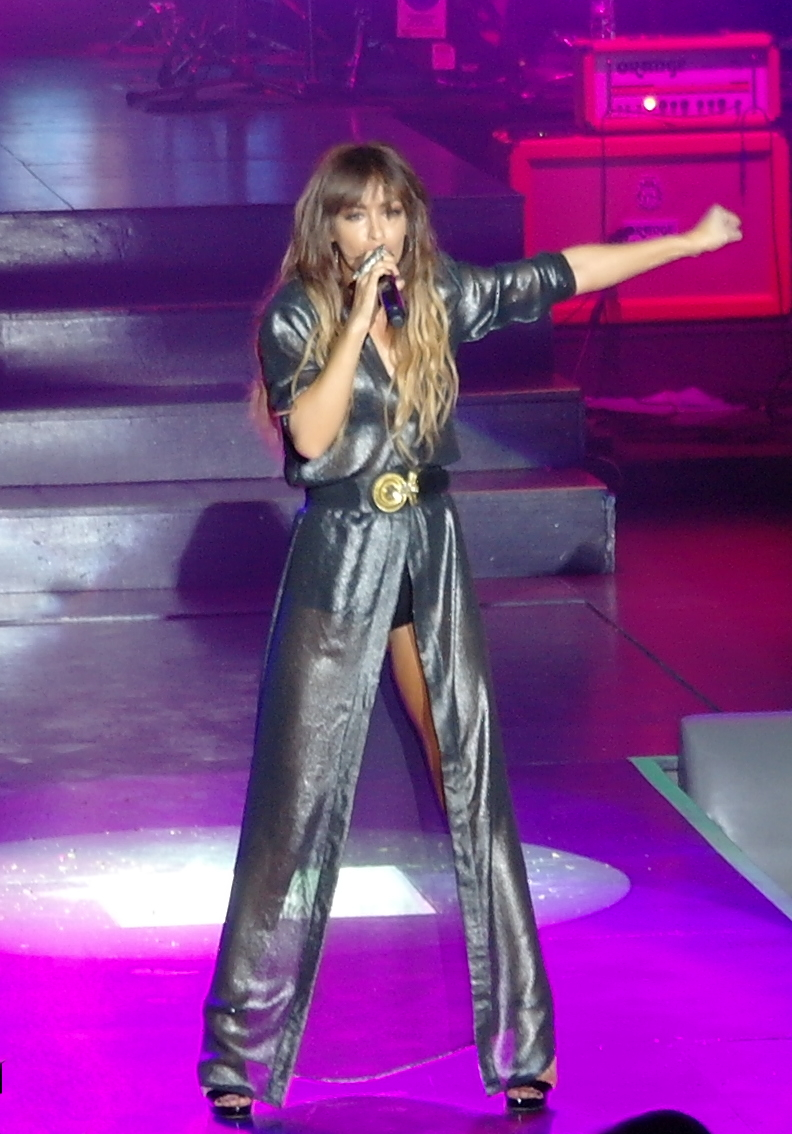
Foureira performing live in 2013.

=== 2010–2018: Pursuit of a solo career ===
After Mystique broke up, Foureira signed a solo contract with Universal Music Greece, the same label as Mystique. She appeared on the charity program Just the Two of Us, hosted by Mega Channel. She tied for first place along with singer Panagiotis Petrakis. Foureira released her self-titled debut studio album in December 2010. Afterwards, she signed with Minos EMI. Her second album Ti Poniro Mou Zitas was released in 2012, while her third Anemos agapis was released in 2014. From 2015 to 2016, she starred as Sofia in the musical Barbarella: the 80's Musical in Athens, alongside other Greek pop stars such as Ivi Adamou and Katy Garbi. Following the release of Anemos agapis, she left Minos EMI and signed with Panik Records. She was a judge on season three of the Greek version of So You Think You Can Dance. Her fourth studio album Vasilissa was released in 2017.

==== Eurovision Song Contest 2018 ====
Foureira has made several attempts to represent Greece in the Eurovision Song Contest. In 2010, she took part in the Greek national final for the Eurovision Song Contest 2010 with Manos Pyrovolakis, performing the song "Kivotos tou Noe". They placed second behind Giorgos Alkaios. In 2013, she performed "Wild Dances" with Ruslana at Eurosong 2013 – a MAD show. She later considered taking part in Eurosong 2015 - NERIT & MAD show, but ultimately did not. She once again attempted to represent Greece in the Eurovision Song Contest 2016 with the song "Come Tiki Tam", but was rejected by Hellenic Broadcasting Corporation (ERT). In 2017, she was rejected by the broadcaster for the Eurovision Song Contest 2017 once again.

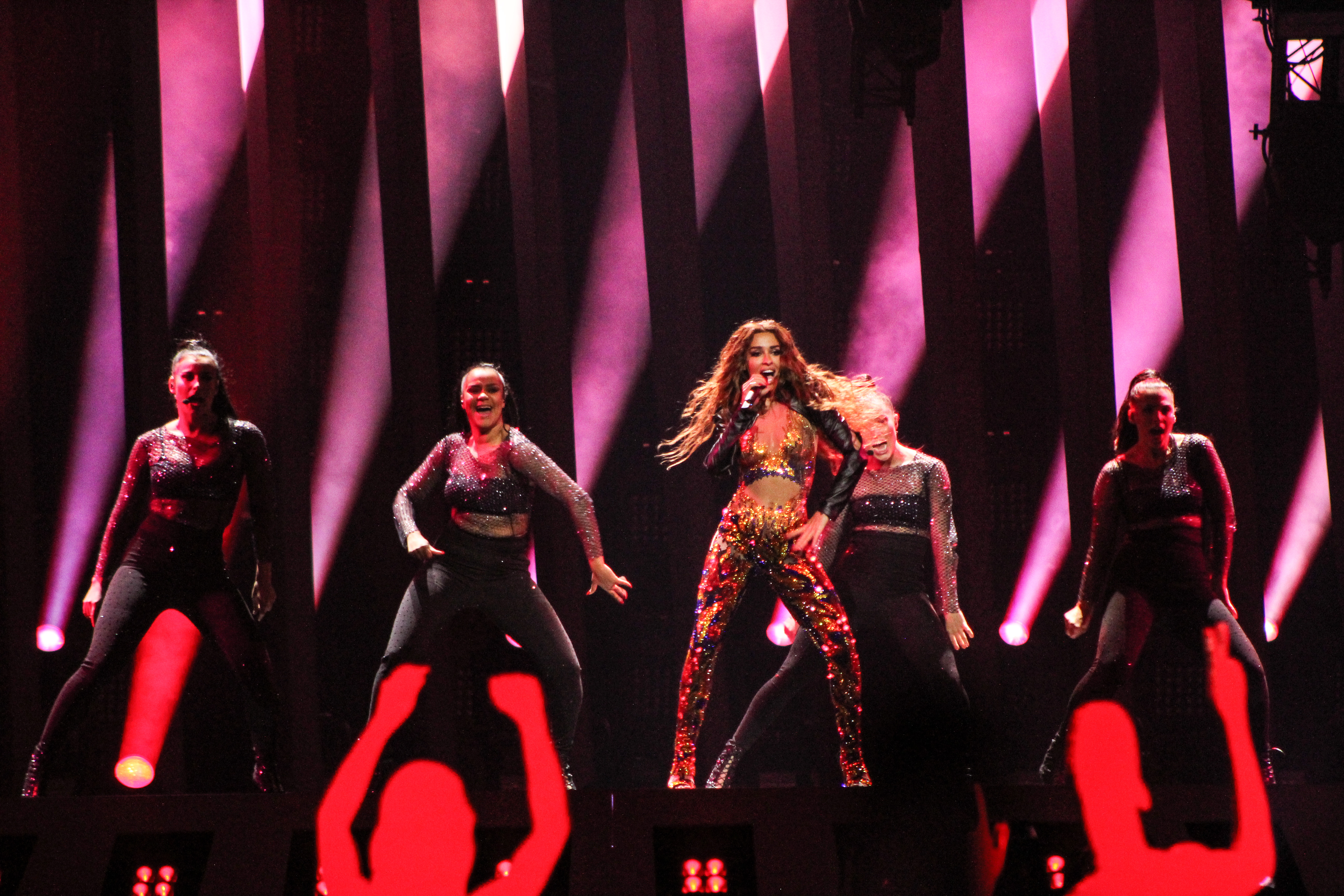
Foureira performing "Fuego" at Eurovision 2018.

In February 2018, it was confirmed that Foureira would represent Cyprus in the Eurovision Song Contest 2018 with the song "Fuego". The song was composed by Greek-Swedish songwriter Alex Papaconstantinou. Foureira was seen as one of three ethnic Albanians competing that year, each of them representing different countries. Foureira posed with Albanian contestant Eugent Bushpepa, making the crossed hands gesture denoting the double eagle of the Flag of Albania. In response, nationalist Greeks spoke out against Foureira, saying she should be removed from the contest, but Cyprus continued to support her. On 8 May 2018, she qualified from the first semi-final to the grand final. In the final held on 12 May 2018, she finished as the runner-up to winner Netta from Israel, having received the fifth most votes from the international juries and the second most votes from the public televoting process; this marked Cyprus' best Eurovision placement in history.

=== 2018–present: Post-Eurovision success ===
Shortly after Eurovision 2018, Eleni signed a record deal with Sony Music. By doing so, she became only the second Greek artist to sign an international deal with a major record label after Helena Paparizou (who won the Eurovision Song Contest 2005). In late June, she released her Greek single "Caramela", which topped the Digital Single Chart. In mid-October, she released the non-album single "Tómame", which was also number one hit. Towards the end of the year, it was announced that "Fuego" has been certified platinum in Spain, and gold in Norway and Sweden, becoming Eleni's first song to achieve this.

On 17 May 2019, Eleni released her first international project, an extended play titled Gypsy Woman (EP), which includes the song "El Ritmo Psicodelico" as the lead single. To further promote her studio project, she embarked on a European tour in various cities in Greece, Spain, and the United Kingdom. Around the same time, during the Host Broadcaster press conference of the Eurovision Song Contest 2019, Foureira was announced as one of the four artists from previous contests that will perform as an interval act in the final, where she performed the 2007 runner-up Verka Serduchka's song "Dancing Lasha Tumbai". Throughout the rest of the year, she mostly took part in collaborations with artists such as Kaan and Snoop Dogg, and Claydee. In March 2020, she released the electropop and R&B single Yayo. In June, she released a Greek single "Temperatura", which was later accompanied with a Spanish version.

In December 2019, she performed as a surprise guest at Festivali i Këngës 58, the Albanian national selection contest for Eurovision, held in Tirana, Albania. After performing a medley of her own songs and international hits, she sang a few Albanian folk songs alongside TV presenter Alketa Vejsiu, accompanied with a monologue in the Albanian language on her Albanian roots, since she moved from Albania during her childhood.

Towards the end of 2020, Eleni Foureira released two dance-pop, electropop, nu-disco, and synth-pop records "Light It Up" (in October) and "Dokimase Me" (in December), both of which contain 1980s and retrofuturism tropes. Around the same time, during a live stream on her official Instagram account, the singer revealed that her forthcoming second extended play, entitled Light It Up, is set for release in early 2021. In May 2021 she released a song with Greek rapper MadClip, titled "Mporei", which was awarded as the best duet at Super Music Awards

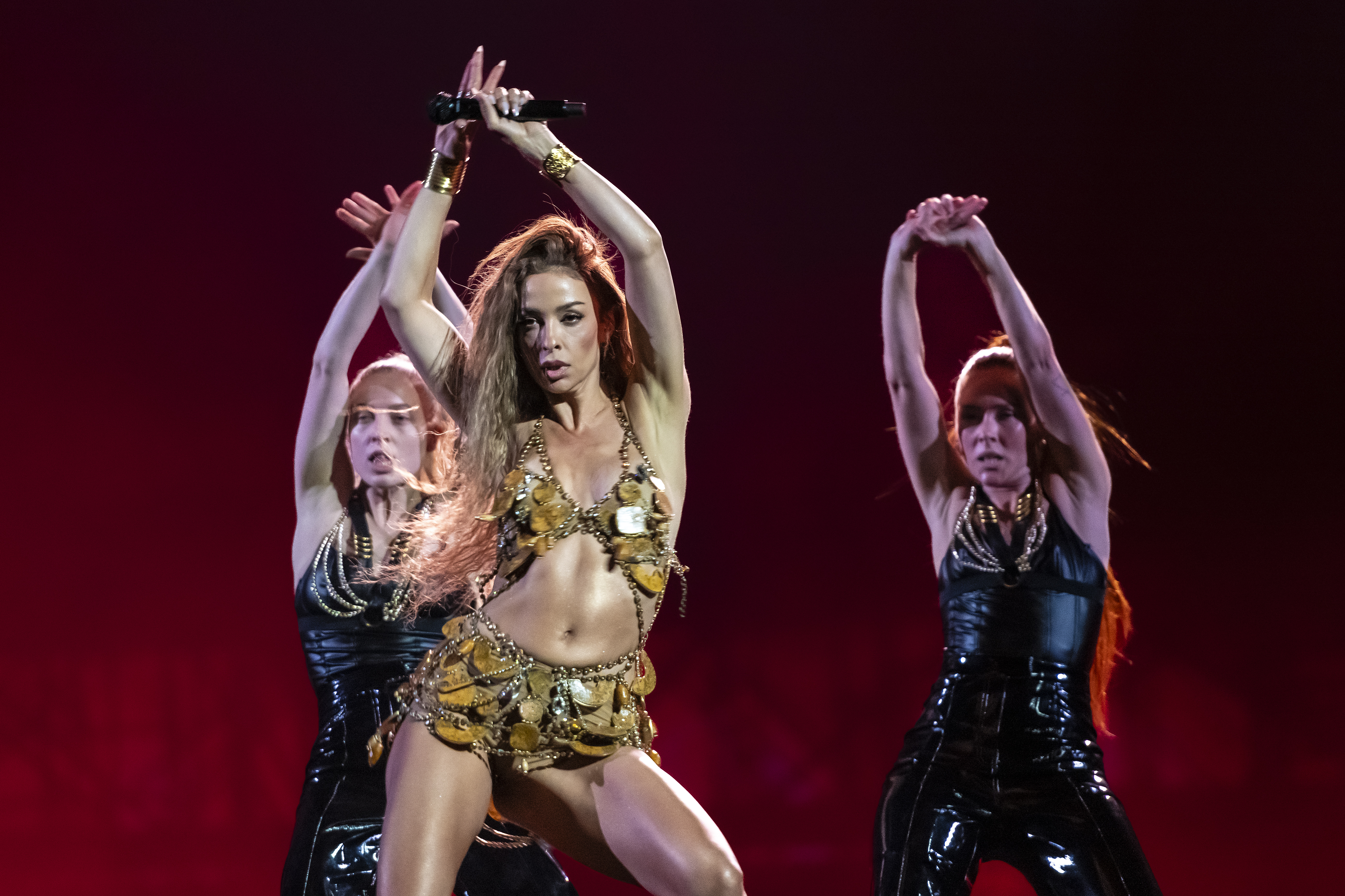
Eleni Foureira as Eurovision Song Contest 2024 opening act

In May 2022, she collaborated on "Mono Esy Kai Ego" with Greek singer Konstantinos Argiros. On 3 June 2022, Foureira released her fifth studio album, Poli Ploki, preceded by the singles "Mporei" and "Aeraki (To Thiliko)".

Starting on 27 May 2023, Foureira embarked on the "Reborn Tour", which took place in stadiums and major theaters in Greece, Cyprus and abroad. On April 16 of the same year, she announced via Instagram that the deluxe version of the album had achieved diamond certification. This made her the first female Greek artist to have a diamond album in the region. A special evening was prepared for the new record with the participation of CEO of Panik Records, Giorgos Arsenakos, who delivered the diamond plaque to Foureira that night. She was featured in APON's song, "Gdysou", which was released on 17 November 2023. The music video to "Gydsou" premiered on 17 January 2024.

On 7 May 2024, she performed as one of the opening acts, alongside Chanel Terrero and Eric Saade, in the first semi-final of the Eurovision Song Contest 2024. After her performance in Eurovision 2024, she started to tease her new single "Aeroplano", which was produced by Beyond and released on 24 May 2024. On 21 June, the remix with rapper Fy was released. She performed this remix along with her next single, "Aristourgima", at the MAD VMAs, where Eleni Foureira won the awards for Best Performer and Best Duet (for "Gdysou" with Apon) on 19 June. The music video for the remix was directed by Yannis Michelopoulos and released on 4 July. The MAD Video Music Awards were televised on 7 July, the same night "Aristourgima" written by Arcade and Foxy Lee, was released. In August, she was featured on the song "10'" on Saske' album Get Loved or Die Tryin'. On 24 October 2025, she released her sixth studio album, Hybrid, which includes 13 tracks.

== Personal life ==
=== Relationships ===
Since 2017, she has been in a relationship with Alberto Botía, a Spanish footballer who was playing in Greece for the team Olympiacos F.C. at the time. On 13 November 2022, Foureira announced her pregnancy via her Instagram account. She gave birth to a baby boy, whom they later baptized Ermis, on 7 February 2023.

=== Origins ===
Since the beginning of her career, the Greek media have speculated on Foureira's ancestral origins. As a member of Mystique, she claimed to be Brazilian. She later claimed that her father was from Athens and her mother from Ioannina, although she had some Mexican ancestry as well. In 2018, Foureira confirmed that she became a Greek citizen through descent, and also declared that her grandfather was Greek.

In 2013, it was reported by the Greek media that Foureira was born in Albania and that her birth name was Entela Fureraj. Foureira did not comment on the reports until 2014, when she confirmed them. She claimed that she did not reveal her origin in order to be accepted in the music industry in Greece. She continued claiming she never understood the issue, since she always felt Greek and she has received only Greek education. Andreas Giatrakos, who discovered Foureira and recruited her to join Mystique, later stated that he wanted Foureira to be proud of her origin and would not have rejected her if he knew she was born in Albania.

During the Eurovision Song Contest 2018, Foureira made the Albanian patriotic eagle gesture in a photo with Albanian singer Eugent Bushpepa. The image went viral in Albania and Greece, being well-received in the former but causing controversy in the latter.

== Discography ==
- Eleni Foureira (2010)
- Ti Poniro Mou Zitas (2012)
- Anemos Agapis (2014)
- Vasilissa (2017)
- Gypsy Woman (EP) (2019)
- Poli_Ploki (2022)
- Hybrid (2025)

== Filmography ==
=== Television ===
Title	Year	Role	Notes
Ellinikos Telikos 2010	2010	Herself / Contestant	Duo with Manos Pirovolakis 2nd place
Just the Two of Us	2010–2011	Herself / Coach & Contestant	Season 1 of the Greek Just the Two of Us Winner
Eurosong 2013 – a MAD show	2013	Herself / Performer	Interval act with Ruslana in the Greek national final for the Eurovision Song Contest 2013
So You Think You Can Dance	2017	Herself / Judge	Season 3 of the Greek So You Think You Can Dance
Eurovision Song Contest 2018	2018	Herself / Contestant	Cypriot entrant; 2nd place
Golden Stag Festival	2018	Herself / Guest judge & Performer	Romanian show
Tu Cara Me Suena	2018	Herself / Guest judge	Season 7 of the Spanish Your Face Sounds Familiar
Operación Triunfo	2019	Herself / Performer	Season 10 of the Spanish Star Academy
Söngvakeppnin 2019	2019	Herself / Guest judge & Performer	Iceland in the Eurovision Song Contest 2019
Eser Yenenler Show	2019	Herself / Performer	Season 1 of the Turkish show
Eurovision Song Contest 2019	2019	Herself / Performer	Interval act
The Final Four	2019	Herself / Judge	Season 1 of the Greek The Four
Het Grote Songfestivalfeest	2019	Herself / Performer	
House of Fame: La Academia	2021	Herself / Hostess	Season 1 of the Greek La Academia
Greece's Next Top Model	2021	Herself / Guest star	Season 5 of the Greek Top Model Episode: "The Foureira Show"
The Voice of Greece	2021	Herself / Guest mentor	Season 8 of the Greek The Voice
The X Factor	2022	Herself	Video message Season 4 of Israeli The X Factor
Fame Story	2023	Herself / Judge	Season 5 of the Greek Star Academy
Milky Way	2023	Herself	Television acting debut
Eurovision Song Contest 2024	2024	Herself / Performer	Opening Act

=== Theater ===
Title	Year	Role	Notes
Barbarella: the 80's Musical	2015–2016	Sophia	Pireos 131 Theater

=== Film ===
Title	Year	Role	Notes
The Bachelor 2	2017	Woman on the street	Supporting role
Aigaio SOS	2018	Herself	Supporting role
Broadway	2022	Herself	Supporting role

== Tours and residencies ==
=== Concert tours ===
Headlining tour

- Summer Tour (2017)
- European Summer Tour (2018)
- Fuego Tour (2018–2019)
- Gypsy Woman Tour (2019)
- Poli_Ploki Tour (2022)
- Reborn Tour (2023)
- Eleni Foureira (2024)
- European Tour (2025)
- Hybrid Tour (2026)

Promotional tour

- Summer Tour (with Kostas Martakis) (2010)
- Summer Concerts (2015)
- Summer Concerts (2020)
- European Concerts (2021)

Co-headlining tour

- Summer Tour (with Antonis Remos and Stelios Rokkos) (2013)
- The Ace Of Hearts 2014 (with Sakis Rouvas, Onirama, Boys & Noise and Xenia Ghali) (2014)
- Eleftheros Tour (with Konstantinos Argyros) (2022)

Opening act

- Maluma World Tour (guest star at Maluma's concert) (2022)

=== Concert residencies ===
Headlining residency – primary act

- Lohan (2025–2026)

Co-headlining residency – primary act

- Fantasia (with Pantelis Pantelidis and Melisses) (2015)
- Fantasia (with Konstantinos Argyros and Fani Drakopoulou) (2016)
- Fantasia (with Konstantinos Argyros and Fani Drakopoulou) (2016–2017)
- Vogue Club (with Konstantinos Argyros and Fani Drakopoulou) (2017)
- Athinon Arena (with Antonis Remos) (2017–2018)
- Teatro Athens (with Konstantinos Argyros) (2021–2022)
- NOX (with Antonis Remos) (2023–2024)
- Enastron (with Melisses) (2024–2025)

Co-headlining residency – secondary act

- Thalassa: People’s Stage (with Giorgos Mazonakis) (2012)
- Kentro Athinon (with Nikos Vertis) (2014–2015)
- Teatro Music Hall (with Paola and Konstantinos Argyros) (2015–2016)

Co-headlining residency – tertiary act

- Anodos Live Stage (with Natassa Theodoridou, Kostas Martakis and Ilias Vretos) (2010–2011)
- Pyli Axiou: Live Clubbing (with Sakis Rouvas and Tamta) (2011)
- Athinon Arena (with Sakis Rouvas and Onirama) (2011–2012)
- Athinon Arena (with Antonis Remos and Stelios Rokkos) (2012–2013)
- Fever (with Nikos Oikonomopoulos and Vasilis Karras) (2013–2014)

== Awards and nominations ==
Year	Organization	Category	Nominated work	Result	Ref.
2011	MAD Video Music Awards	Sexiest Video	"To 'cho (Pom Pom)"	Won	
2011	MAD Video Music Awards	Best New Artist	Herself	Won	
2011	MAD Video Music Awards	Best Female Artist	Herself	Nominated	
2012	MAD Video Music Awards	Sexiest Video	"Reggaeton"	Won	
2012	MAD Video Music Awards	Best Pop Video	"Reggaeton"	Won	
2012	MAD Video Music Awards	Best Female Artist	Herself	Nominated	
2012	MAD Video Music Awards	Artist of the Year – Cyprus	Herself	Nominated	
2013	MAD Video Music Awards	Fashion Icon in a Video	"Pio Erotas Pethaineis"	Won	
2013	MAD Video Music Awards	Best Pop Video	"Pio Erotas Pethaineis"	Nominated	
2013	MAD Video Music Awards	Best Song	"To Party Den Stamata"	Nominated	
2013	MAD Video Music Awards	Best Female Artist	Herself	Nominated	
2014	MAD Video Music Awards	Video of the Year	"Anemos Agapis"	Nominated	
2014	MAD Video Music Awards	Best Dance Act	"Anemos Agapis"	Nominated	
2014	MAD Video Music Awards	Best Female Artist	Herself	Nominated	
2014	MAD Video Music Awards	Artist of the Year – Cyprus	Herself	Nominated	
2015	MAD Video Music Awards	Video of the Year – Cyprus	"Party Sleep Repeat (PSR)"	Won	
2015	MAD Video Music Awards	Best Dance Video	"Party Sleep Repeat (PSR)"	Won	
2015	MAD Video Music Awards	Best Modern Female Artist	Herself	Nominated	
2016	MAD Video Music Awards	Video of the Year	"Sto theo me paei"	Won	
2016	MAD Video Music Awards	Best Pop Video	"Sto theo me paei"	Nominated	
2016	MAD Video Music Awards	Best Modern Female Artist	Herself	Nominated	
2017	MAD Video Music Awards	Best Video with a Cause	"Den Sou Chrostao Agapi	Won	
2017	MAD Video Music Awards	Best Dance Video	"Ti koitas?"	Won	
2017	MAD Video Music Awards	Best Duet/Collaboration	"Ti koitas?"	Nominated	
2017	MAD Video Music Awards	Superfans of the Year	Her fans	Nominated	
2018	MAD Video Music Awards	Best Modern Female Artist	Herself	Won	
2018	MAD Video Music Awards	Video of the Year	"To Kati Pou Echeis"	Nominated	
2018	Marcel Bezençon Awards	Artistic Award	"Fuego"	Won	
2018	Eurovision Song Contest 2018	—	"Fuego"	2	
2019	Gaygalan	Song of the Year	"Fuego"	Nominated	
2019	Super Music Awards Cyprus	Best Modern Female	Herself	Won	
2019	Super Music Awards Cyprus	Best International Single	Fuego	Won	
2019	MAD Video Music Awards	Best Modern Female	Herself	Won	
2019	MAD Video Music Awards	MAD Radio 106.2 Song of the Year	Fuego	Won	
2019	MAD Video Music Awards	Video of the Year	Fuego	Nominated	
2020	MAD Video Music Awards	Best Duet	"Loquita"	Won	
2020	MAD Video Music Awards	Best Female Modern	Herself	Won	
2021	MAD Video Music Awards	Best Female Modern	Herself	Won	
2021	MAD Video Music Awards	Best Pop	"Light it up"	Nominated	
2021	MAD Video Music Awards	MAD Radio 106.2 Song of the Year	"Light it up"	Nominated	
2022	MAD Video Music Awards	Best Duet	"Mporei"	Nominated	
2022	MAD Video Music Awards	Videoclip of the Year	"Mporei"	Won	
2022	MAD Video Music Awards	Videoclip of the Year	Aeraki (To thiliko)	Nominated	
2023	MAD Video Music Awards	Best Female Pop Artist	Herself	Won	
2023	MAD Video Music Awards	Videoclip of the Year	"El Telephone"	Won	
2023	MAD Video Music Awards	Viral Song of the Year	"El Telephone"	Won	
2023	MAD Video Music Awards	Best Pop	"El Telephone"	Nominated	
2023	MAD Video Music Awards	Album of the Year	Poli_Ploki	Nominated	
2023	MAD Video Music Awards	Best Duet	"Fotia"	Nominated	
2023	MAD Video Music Awards	Best Urban	"Egw & Esy"	Nominated	
2024	MAD Video Music Awards	Best Performer	Herself	Won	
2024	MAD Video Music Awards	Best Duet	"Gdysou"	Won	
2024	MAD Video Music Awards	Best Pop	"Kollima"	Nominated	
2024	MAD Video Music Awards	Song of the Year Airplay	"Oh Mami"	Nominated	
2024	MAD Video Music Awards	Song of the Year Digital	"Oh Mami"	Nominated	
2024	MAD Video Music Awards	Videoclip of the Year	"Oh Mami"	Nominated	
2024	MAD Video Music Awards	Best Dance	"Oh Mami"	Nominated	
2026	Berlin Music Video Awards	Best Performer	"Alleluia"	Nominated	

Preceded by Hovig with "Gravity"	Cyprus in the Eurovision Song Contest; 2018	Succeeded by Tamta with "Replay"
