= Music video award =

Music video award or Video music award may refer to:

- Channel O Music Video Awards, Pan-African music awards organised by South Africa-based Channel O
- Grammy Award for Best Music Video, presented by the National Academy of Recording Arts and Sciences, United States
- iHeartRadio Much Music Video Awards (MMVAs), presented by the Canadian television channel Much
- Latin Grammy Award for Best Short Form Music Video, presented by the Latin Recording Academy
- MAD Video Music Awards, an annual awards show on MAD TV, Greece
- Mnet Asian Music Award for Best Music Video Award, presented annually by CJ E&M Pictures
- MTV Video Music Awards, presented by the cable channel MTV
- Soul Train Music Award for Best Video of the Year, produced by the television show Soul Train
- Space Shower Music Video Awards, sponsored by Space Shower TV, Japan
- UK Music Video Awards, organized by BFI Southbank
- Channel O Music Video Awards, Pan-African music awards organised by South Africa-based Channel O
