= Yayo =

Yayo may refer to:

== People ==
- Yayo (footballer, 1914–1990), Santiago Sanz Fraile, Spanish football midfielder turned manager
- Yayo (illustrator) (born 1961), Diego Herrera, Colombian-Canadian children's book illustrator and cartoonist
- Yayo (drug trafficker) (born 1961), Santiago Luis Polanco-Rodríguez, Dominican-American cocaine dealer
- Yayo Guridi (born 1965), José Carlos Guridi, Argentine actor and comedian
- Yayo Aguila (born 1967), Maria Rosario Racelis Aguila, Filipina actress
- Tony Yayo (born 1978), Marvin Bernard, American rapper and member of the rap group G-Unit
- Yayo (footballer, born 2004), Pelayo González Rey, Spanish football midfielder

== Music ==
- "Yayo" (Eleni Foureira song)
- "Yayo" (Lana Del Rey song)
- "Yayo" (Snootie Wild song)
