= Gypsy Woman (EP) =

EP by Eleni Foureira
- Released: 17 May 2019
- Genre: Pop
- Length: 14:28
- Languages: English, Spanish
- Label: Panik

Eleni Foureira chronology
Vasilissa (2017)	Gypsy Woman (2019)	Poli Ploki (2022)

Singles from Gypsy Woman
- 1. "El Ritmo Psicodélico" Released: 2019

Gypsy Woman is the first extended play by Greek singer Eleni Foureira. Hit Channel reported on 14 May 2019. that the EP was going to be released exclusively to Spotify on 17 May 2019 with 5 tracks, a cover of Crystal Waters 1991 song "Gypsy Woman", that Foureira performed at the 2019 MAD Walk event in April, as well as four original songs. On 30 May 2019, it was released on other streaming services. "El Ritmo Psicodélico" acted as a single, a lyric video was released to YouTube on 19 June 2019 and Eleni performed the song at the 2019 MAD Video Music Awards event in July.

== Reception ==
ESCxtra called the EP a fusion of reggaeton and Latin beats. Wiwibloggs wrote that "Gypsy Woman is a series of dance floor bangers that is bound to get you moving to el ritmo.". Press Party wrote about Call Ya specifically, and wrote about the song "the pounding drums, maracas and slinky horns on ‘Call Ya’ give this record all the feels of the Mediterranean. Produced and co-written by A.M. SNiPER., the record is vibrant, sexy and embodies everything that you can come to expect of Eleni Foureira’s music and demeanor". Culture Fix called Barcelona and Maria "immediate bops".

== Tracklist ==
No.	Title	Writer(s)	Producer(s)	Length
1.	"Gypsy Woman"	Crystal Waters, Neal Brian Conway	ARCADE	3:00
2.	"El Ritmo Psicodélico"	Andrea Sandoval, ARCADE, Bosorg Etemad, Eleni Foureira, Juan Carlo Cosme	ARCADE	2:45
3.	"Call Ya"	Amira El-Shafie, A.M. SNiPER, Eleni Foureira, Giuseppe Charles Farinella, Olivia Shrimpton, Da Beatfreakz	Da Beatfreakz & A.M. SNiPER	3:00
4.	"Barcelona"	Claydee, Laurell Barker, Sarah Raba, Timothee Aeby	Ha-j	2:48
5.	"Maria"	Emy Perez, Claydee, Eleni Foureira, Laurell Barker	Claydee, Bhav	2:53
Total length:				14:28

== Videos ==
=== Performances ===
Song	Event
Gypsy Woman	MAD Walk
El Ritmo Psicodélico x Gasolina (featuring 2J)	MAD VMA

=== Lyric video ===
Song	Animation
El Ritmo Psicodélico	Ray Hikari

== Charts ==
Title	Peak chart positions
Title	Singles Greece
Gypsy Woman (EP)	—
Barcelona	32
Call Ya	33
El Ritmo Psicodélico	10
Gypsy Woman - La-Da-Dee	39
Maria	45

== Release history ==
Platform	Date
Spotify	17 May 2019
Apple Music, Tidal, iTunes	30 May 2019
YouTube	Various
