= Poli Ploki =

Poli_Ploki

Studio album by Eleni Foureira
- Released: 3 June 2022
- Recorded: October 2020 - April 2022
- Genre: Pop
- Length: 36:17
- Language: Greek
- Label: Panik records

Eleni Foureira chronology
Gypsy Woman (2019)	Poli_Ploki (2022)	Hybrid (2025)

Alternative cover

Singles from Poli_Ploki & Poli_Ploki (Deluxe)
- 1. "Mporei (with Mad Clip)" Released: 18 May 2021; 2. "Aeraki (To Thiliko)" Released: 7 July 2021; 3. "Fotiá (with Evangelia)" Released: 3 December 2021; 4. "Poli_Ploki" Released: 10 June 2022; 5. "Egw & Esy (with Trannos)" Released: 12 August 2022; 6. "El Telephone (Remix) (with Ayman, DJ Bobito, Mente Fuerte, Trannos & FY)" Released: 21 October 2022; 7. "Sigkinitika "Sigkinithika"" Released: 21 December 2022; 8. "Oh Mami (with McDaddy)" Released: 19 May 2023; 9. "Kolima (with Display)" Released: 7 July 2023; 10. "Gdysou (with APON)" Released: 17 November 2023

Poli_Ploki (Greek: Πολύ_Πλοκή) is the fifth studio album by Greek singer Eleni Foureira. The album was released on streaming services on 3 June 2022 by Panik Records. The physicals were released on 14 November of the same year.

In April 2024, it was announced that the album had been certified Diamond by IFPI Greece, becoming the first album to achieve this status in the country.

== Singles ==
The first single of the album was a collaboration with Mad Clip, one of the biggest rappers at the time in Greece. The music video was released the same day. Five more singles were released for the standard edition of the album and five more for the deluxe edition.

== Track listing ==
Standard edition
No.	Title	Writer(s)	Producer(s)	Length
1.	"Xereis I Eleni"	Foureira	Foureira, Psimopoulos	2:56
2.	"El Telephone" (with DJ Bobita, Ayman)	Rigas, Ayman, Bobito, Paco	Bobito, Paco	2:50
3.	"Aya" (with Hawk)	Foureira, Hawk, Psimopoulos	Psimopoulos, Baghad	3:21
4.	"Pes To"	Foureira	Foureira, Psimopoulos	3:09
5.	"Sigkinita 'Sigkinithika'"	Foureira, Papas	Foureira, Psimopoulos	3:00
6.	"Poli_Ploki"	Lila	Beyond	2:28
7.	"Oxi"	Trilogy	Trilogy	2:44
8.	"Mono Esy Kai Ego" (with Konstantinos Argiros)	Foureira,Argiros	Argiros, Foureira, Psimopoulos	3:10
9.	"I Amartia Thelei Esena"	Efremidis, Papavasiliou	Psimopoulos	2:26
10.	"Aeraki (To Thiliko)"	Dumos	Giorgos Papadopoulos	3:11
11.	"Mporei" (with Mad Clip)	Foureira, Madclip	Skive	3:11
12.	"Fotiá" (with Evangelia)	Evangelia, Alexis Troy, Jay Stolar	Evangelia, Alexis Troy, Jay Stolar, Jon Buscema	3:11
Total length:				36:17

Deluxe Edition
No.	Title	Writer(s)	Producer(s)	Length
13.	"Kolima" (with Display)	Foureira, Display, Daphne Lawrence, Ripen	Display	2:42
14.	"Oh Mami" (with MC Daddy)	MC Daddy, Teo Tzimas	Teo Tzimas	2:41
15.	"El Telephone (Remix)" (with DJ Bobito, Ayman, Mente Fuerte, FY, Trannos)	Ayman, Rigas, Fy, Trannos, Mente Fuerte, Foureira, Paco, Bobito	Bobito, Paco	4:24
16.	"Egw & Esy" (with Trannos)	Foureira, Stasinopoulos, Psimopoulos, Stanley	Psimopoulos, Stanley	3:06
17.	"Gdysou" (with APON)	Apon	Apon, IAmStrong	2:55
Total length:				51:37

== Release history ==
Release history and formats for Poli_Ploki
Country	Edition	Release date	Format	Tracks	Label
Various	Standard	3 June 2022	Digital download; streaming	12	Panik
Cyprus, Greece	Standard	14 November 2022	CD	12	Panik
Various	Deluxe	8 April 2024	Digital download; streaming	17	Panik

== Music Videos ==
Song	Release date	Director
Poli_Ploki	10.06.2022	Yiannis Dimolitsas
Aya	01.09.2022	George Benioudakis
Egw & Esy	23.09.2022	Manos Makrakis
El Telephone Remix	31.10.2022	Yiannis Dimolitsas
Sigkinitika Sigkinithika	23.12.2022	Tasos Chatzis , Petros Nikolintais
Oh Mami	06.06.2023	Yiannis Dimolitsas
Kolima	03.09.2023	Yiannis Dimolitsas
Gdysou	17.01.2024	Yiannis Dimolitsas
