= Ti Poniro Mou Zitas =

Studio album by Eleni Foureira
- Released: 1 July 2012
- Genre: Pop
- Length: 39:00
- Language: Greek, English
- Label: Minos-EMI

Eleni Foureira chronology
Eleni Foureira (2010)	Ti Poniro Mou Zitas (2012)	Anemos Agapis (2014)

Singles from Ti Poniro Mou Zitas
- 1. "Reggaeton" Released: 2011; 2. "To Party Den Stamata" Released: 2012; 3. "All I Need" Released: 2012

Ti Poniro Mou Zitas (Greek: Tι Πονηρό Μου Ζητάς) is the second studio album by Greek singer Eleni Foureira. The album was released in Greece and Cyprus on July 1, 2012, by Minos-EMI S.A.

== Singles ==
Ti Poniro Mou Zitas includes "Reggaeton", which was released before the album. Two further singles were released: ""All I Need", and "To Party Den Stamata".

== Track listing ==
Standard edition
No.	Title	Writer(s)	Producer(s)	Length
1.	"Reggaeton"	Christodoulos Siganos	Christodoulos Siganos, Marios Psimopoulos	3:33
2.	"To Party Den Stamata" (featuring Midenistis)	Midenistis, Alex Leon, Paulos Manolis, SKey	Midenistis, Alex Leon	4:04
3.	"Ti Poniro Mou Zitas"	Thirio	Loud	3:12
4.	"Mystiko"	Vicki Gerothodorou	Marios Psimopoulos	3:18
5.	"Stou Erota Tin Trela"	Aggeliki Vardi	Alex Leon	4:20
6.	"Pio Erotas Petheneis"	Thanos Papanikolaou	Vasilis Gavriilidis	3:43
7.	"Agapi Pou Na Tairiazei Se Mena"	Thanos Papanikolaou	Vasilis Gavriilidis	3:13
8.	"Na S' Exo Mesa Mou"	Thirio	Loud	3:51
9.	"Paixe Mazi Mou (Fun O Eh A)" (featuring Ciprian Robu)	Viki Gerothodorou	Ciprian Robu	3:26
10.	"Sexy (Reggaeton)"	Histrodoulous Siganos	Hristodoulos Siganos, Marios Psimopoulos	3:33
11.	"All I Need"	Alexandra Zakka, Loud	Loud	3:37

== Chart performance ==
Chart (2012)	Peak position
Greek Albums (IFPI)	7

== Release history ==
Region	Release date	Format	Label	Refs
Greece	1 July 2012	Digital download, CD	Minos-EMI S.A.	
Cyprus	1 July 2012	Digital download, CD	Minos-EMI S.A.	
