= Yayo (Eleni Foureira song) =

2020 single by Eleni Foureira

Single by Eleni Foureira
- English title: Digital download; streaming
- Released: 3 March 2020
- Genre: Electropop; R&B
- Length: 2:48
- Label: Panik Records
- Songwriters: Andy Nicolas; Eleni Foureira; Klejdi Llupa; Kareem Kalokoh
- Producers: Alex Leon; Eleni Foureira; Klejdi Llupa; Marios Psimopoulos

Eleni Foureira singles chronology
"Loquita" (2019)	"Yayo" (2020)	"Temperatura" (2020)

Music video
- "Yayo" on YouTube

"Yayo" is a song recorded by Greek singer Eleni Foureira. The electropop and R&B song was written by the aforementioned artist together with Andy Nicolas, Claydee and Kareem Kalokoh. An accompanying music video was shot in the United States and officially premiered onto the official YouTube channel of the singer's label Panik Records on 3 March 2020, where it has since accumulated more than 6.5 million views.

== Composition and music video ==
"Yayo" has a running time of two minutes and forty eight seconds, and was written by Foureira herself together with Andy Nicolas, Claydee and Kareem Kalokoh. Its production was handled by Foureira and Claydee while being mastered and mixed by Sweetspot Production. An accompanying music video for "Yayo" was premiered onto the official YouTube channel of Foureira's music label Panik Records on 3 March 2020, where it has since amassed more than 6.5 million views.

== Personnel ==
Credits adapted from Tidal and YouTube.

- Eleni Foureira – composing, performing, producing, songwriting, vocals
- Klejdi Llupa – composing, producing, songwriting
- Andy Nicolas – songwriting
- Kareem Kalokoh – songwriting, vocals
- Alex Leon – producing
- Marios Psimopoulos – producing
- Yannis Dimolitsas – video directing
- Alexis Kanakis – photo directing
- Manthos Sardis – colouring
- George Damaskinos – video production

== Charts ==
Chart (2020)	Peak position
Greece (Digital Single Chart)	3

== Track listing ==
- Digital download
1. "Yayo" – 2:48

== Release history ==
Region	Date	Format	Label	Ref.
Various	3 March 2020	Digital download; streaming	Panik	
