= Fuego (Eleni Foureira song) =

2018 single by Eleni Foureira

Single by Eleni Foureira

from the album Fuego
- Released: 9 March 2018
- Genre: Dance; pop
- Length: 3:03
- Label: A-P; Panik; Sony
- Lyricists: Alex Papaconstantinou; Anderz Wrethov; Didrick; Geraldo Sandell; Viktor Svensson
- Producers: Alex P; Victory

Eleni Foureira singles chronology
"Vasilissa" (2017)	"Fuego" (2018)	"Caramela" (2018)

Music video
- "Fuego" on YouTube

Eurovision Song Contest 2018 entry
- Country: Cyprus
- Artist: Eleni Foureira
- Language: English
- Composers: Alex Papaconstantinou; Anderz Wrethov; Didrick; Geraldo Sandell; Viktor Svensson
- Lyricists: Alex Papaconstantinou; Anderz Wrethov; Didrick; Geraldo Sandell; Viktor Svensson

Finals performance
- Semi-final result: 2nd
- Semi-final points: 262
- Final result: 2nd
- Final points: 436

Entry chronology
- ◄ "Gravity" (2017)
- "Replay" (2019) ►

"Fuego" (Spanish: [ˈfweɣo]; transl. "Fire") is a song by Greek singer Eleni Foureira. The song was produced by Alex Papaconstantinou, Didrick and Victory, who also served as co-writers with Anderz Wrethov and Geraldo Sandell. It was released as a single for digital download and streaming on 9 March 2018 in Greece and in various countries on 19 May by A-P, Panik and Sony. Incorporating ethnic and traditional elements, it is an upbeat dance and pop song, with the lyrics addressing female empowerment as well as emancipation and strength.

"Fuego" represented Cyprus in the Eurovision Song Contest 2018 in Lisbon, Portugal, after being internally selected by the Cypriot broadcaster Cyprus Broadcasting Corporation (CyBC) in February 2018. During the contest in May 2018, Cyprus finished second in the first semi-final and qualified for the final, finishing second with 436 points, marking the nation's best result in the contest. Foureira's red and purple-toned performance featured her whipping around her hair, hip swivelling, pose striking and catwalk strutting across the stage, accompanied by four female backing dancers.

Music critics received "Fuego" with positive acclaim upon release, commending its production, lyrics and Foureira's vocal delivery. Commercially, the song reached number one in Greece and Spain and entered the top 100 in several other countries. It further received a platinum certification by the Productores de Música de España (PROMUSICAE) in Spain. An accompanying music video was filmed in Marathon and Piraeus, and first uploaded to Panik's YouTube channel on 2 March 2018. Following the Eurovision Song Contest, Foureira embarked on a tour throughout Europe, including in Albania, Netherlands, Sweden and the United Kingdom.

== Background and composition ==
Panik and Sony released "Fuego" as a single for digital download and streaming in Greece on 9 March 2018 as well as in various countries on 19 May. Alex Papaconstantinou, Didrick and Victory produced the song and wrote it alongside Anderz Wrethov, Geraldo Sandell and Viktor Svensson. With a Spanish title, "Fuego" is an upbeat dance and pop song, backed by an ethnic and traditional sound and instrumentation. Regarding its meaning, Foureira described the theme of the song as female empowerment, with her aiming to "show the fire that women have inside them". According to a music critic, the lyrics "represent a sense of emancipation and strength[, with] an internal smouldering that gives life, lust, love and more". Lyrics include: "Cause I'm way up and I ain't coming down, you takin' me higher [...] cause I'm burning up and I ain't cooling down, I got the fire [...] fuego."

== Reception ==
Upon release, "Fuego" received generally positive reviews from music critics. William Lee Adams from Billboard highlighted the song as a "Mediterranean [...] anthem" and praised its "something plastic [yet] infectious" lyrics. An editor from The Week characterised the song as "catchy" with "classic Euro-cobblers" lyrics, and further wrote that "Foureira delivers them with plenty of Mediterranean heat, accompanied by some throbbing electro backing". In a Wiwibloggs article with several reviews from individual critics, overall acclamation was concentrated on Foureira's voice as well as the song's appeal, catchiness and nature. Commercially, "Fuego" experienced widespread success on record charts after its participation in the Eurovision Song Contest, reaching number one in Greece and Spain. The song further reached the top 20 in Belgium, Norway, Portugal and Sweden. It also received a double platinum certification by the Productores de Música de España (PROMUSICAE) in Spain for shifting more than 120,000 units.

== Promotion and other usage ==
An accompanying music video for "Fuego" premiered to the YouTube channel of Panik on 2 March 2018 at 20:00 (CET), with the upload to the channel of the Eurovision Song Contest following on 12 March. The video was directed by Apollon Papatheocharis and filmed in Marathon and at the Piraeus Municipal Theatre in Piraeus. Following her Eurovision Song Contest participation, Foureira embarked on a tour throughout Europe in 2018, including in Albania, Cyprus, Greece, Malta, the Netherlands, Sweden and the United Kingdom. Also in 2018, the singer performed "Fuego" on the Spanish dance show Fama A Bailar in May, at the Coca-Cola Festival in Tirana in August as well as at the Los40 Music Awards in November. She also provided live performances of the song in 2019 at the national finals of Albania, Iceland and Spain for the Eurovision Song Contest. "Fuego" has been covered by several other Eurovision contestants, including Bilal Hassani, Daði Freyr, Eden Alene, Måns Zelmerlöw, Slavko Kalezić and the Black Mamba. Bella Santiago, Liis Lemsalu and Lola Índigo impersonated Foureira and provided performances of the song for the Romanian, Estonian and Spanish versions of the reality talent show Your Face Sounds Familiar, respectively. The song was further featured on the second season of the Spanish series Elite in 2019.

== At Eurovision Song Contest ==
=== Before Lisbon ===
In January 2018, the Cyprus Broadcasting Corporation (CyBC) announced the Cypriot entry for the Eurovision Song Contest 2018 to be internally selected. Prior to this, the broadcaster planned to hold audition rounds and a national final to select their entry but cancelled the selection process with no official statement. Foureira with "Fuego" was confirmed as the nation's representative by the broadcaster on 1 February 2018. Following the announcement, the singer declared that she would promise to perform to the best of her ability in Lisbon, saying: "I would like to say a big thank you to CyBC and all the Cypriot people for giving me this opportunity. It is a great honour for me to represent this wonderful country, which has supported me so much for all of these years." Given her Albanian origin, Foureira's announcement as the nation's representative sparked a divisive debate in Cyprus and Greece on racism and discrimination. She was one of three ethnic Albanian participants in the contest, with each of them representing different countries.

=== In Lisbon ===
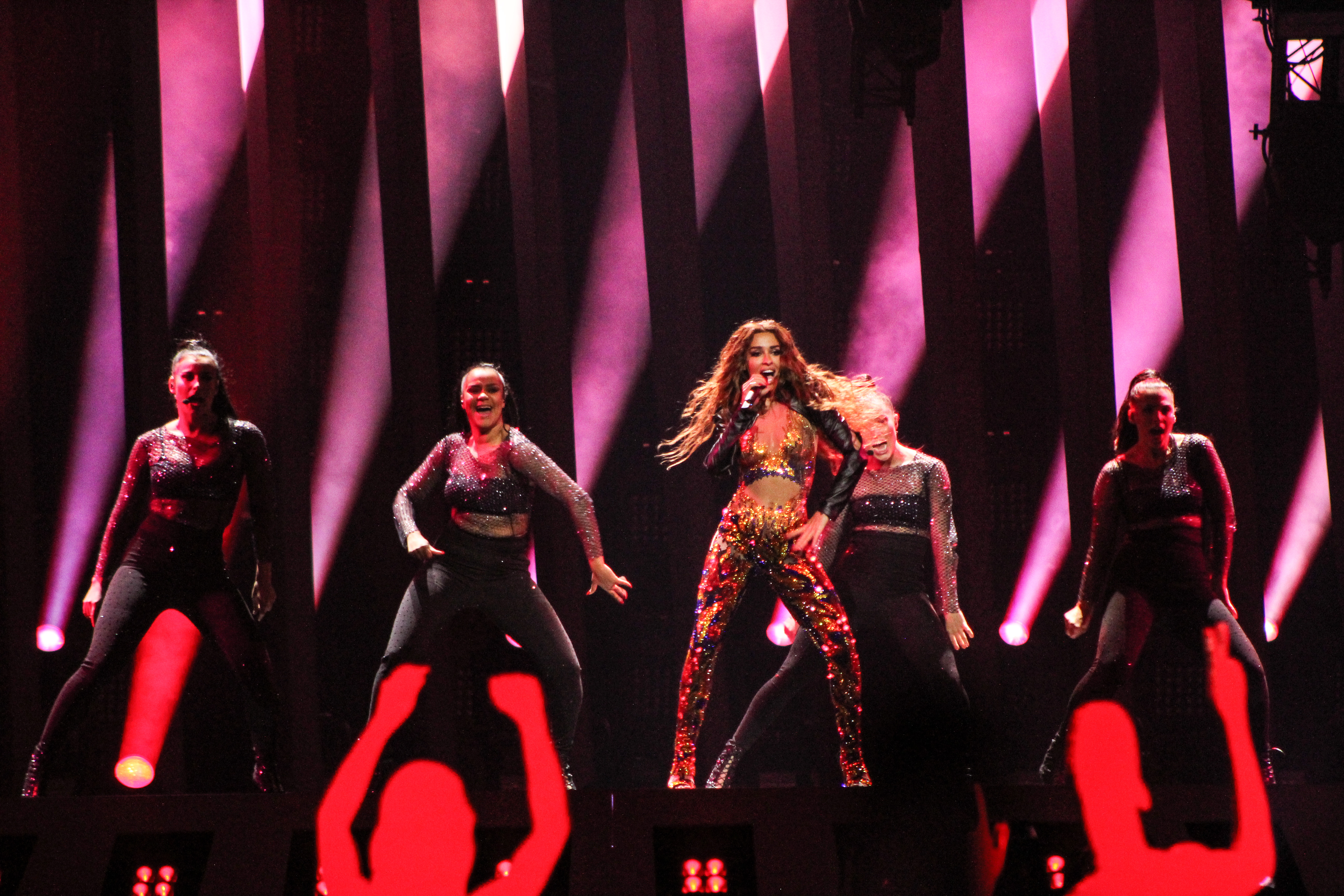
Eleni Foureira performing "Fuego" during a rehearsal for the first semi-final of the Eurovision Song Contest 2018.

The 63rd edition of the Eurovision Song Contest took place at Altice Arena in Lisbon, Portugal, and consisted of two semi-finals on 8 and 10 May and the final on 12 May 2018. According to the Eurovision rules, each participating country, except the host country and the "Big Five", consisting of France, Germany, Italy, Spain and the United Kingdom, were required to qualify from one of two semi-finals to compete for the grand final, although, the top 10 countries from the respective semi-final progress to the grand final. In March 2018, it was announced that "Fuego" would be performed in the second half of the first semi-final of the contest at 19th position, succeeding Ireland. In the first-semi-final, Cyprus was one of the 10 nations to be announced as having qualified for the final, ranking 2nd with 262 points. Subsequently, the nation was placed to perform at 25th position, succeeding Ireland and preceding Italy. In the final, Cyprus finished in second place at the end of the voting, receiving a total of 436 points and having received 12 from the televoters and juries, including from Armenia, Bulgaria, Greece, Spain and Sweden. This stood as the nation's best result in its participation history in the contest.

Foureira's performance of "Fuego" for the Eurovision Song Contest was directed by Swedish artistic director Sacha Jean-Baptiste. On stage, the singer was accompanied by a backing vocalist, namely Teddy Sky, and four female backing dancers, including Celia Caap, Keisha von Arnold, Lovisa Bengtsson and Marlene Lindahl. Foureira wore a glittery bodysuit with a transparent piece around her stomach and leather sleeves as well as high-heel boots, designed by Greek fashion designer Vrettos Vrettakos. The performance began with the front and centre of Foureira's silhouette against a light tunnel illuminated blue created by lasers. Upon walking through the tunnel, the lights began to change from blue to red with the backing dancers entering the performance. It continued with smoke in shades of purple as well as fire shooting into the air from the edge of the circular stage. It predominantly included red and purple-toned lighting as well as Foureira whipping around her hair, hip swivelling, pose striking and catwalk strutting across the stage with her troup.

The performance was met with generally positive reviews from critics. Jay McCarthy from the HuffPost highlighted Foureira's fashion and dancing, which according to her "looked straight from a Pussycat Dolls video [and] a cross between Beyoncé and Shakira". In writing for Billboard, Adams wrote that "[Foureira] whipped her hair with Shakira precision and Beyoncé abandon". BBC's Steve Holden described the performance as "[a] high intensity choreography and hair flicking [making] even Beyoncé proud". An editor from The National Herald felt that "it is the kind of thing J-Lo or Shakira would do" and labelled the act a "powerful [and] in-your-face celebration of women". For The Week, the editor elaborated, "given the title, the live performance [of 'Fuego'] is guaranteed to include spectacular pyrotechnics, green-screen flames and some red-hot dance moves."

== Track listing ==
- Digital download and streaming
1. "Fuego" – 3:03
2. "Fuego" (Spanish Version) – 3:03
- Digital download and streaming – Remix
1. "Fuego" (Playmen Festival Remix) – 3:14

== Charts ==
=== Weekly charts ===
Weekly chart performance for "Fuego"
Chart (2018)	Peak position
Austria (Ö3 Austria Top 40)	35
Belgium (Ultratip Bubbling Under Flanders)	10
Finland (Suomen virallinen lista)	82
Germany (GfK)	81
Greece (IFPI)	1
Netherlands (Single Top 100)	96
Norway (VG-lista)	16
Poland Dance (ZPAV)	33
Portugal (AFP)	18
Scottish Singles Sales (Official Charts)	30
Spain (Promusicae)	9
Sweden (Sverigetopplistan)	14
UK Singles (Official Charts)	64

=== Year-end charts ===
Year-end chart performance for "Fuego"
Chart (2018)	Position
Iceland (Tónlistinn)	39
Spain (PROMUSICAE)	70

== Certifications ==
Certifications and sales for "Fuego"
Region	Certification	Certified units/sales
Spain (Promusicae)	2× Platinum	120,000^{‡}
^{‡} Sales+streaming figures based on certification alone.

== Release history ==
Release dates and formats for "Fuego"
Region	Date	Format(s)	Label(s)	Ref.
Greece	9 March 2018	Digital download; streaming	A-P; Panik; Sony	
Italy	11 May 2018	Radio airplay	CDF	
Various	19 May 2018	Digital download; streaming	A-P; Panik; Sony	

== See also ==
- List of number-one singles of 2018 (Spain)
