= Claydee =

Greek and Albanian singer and producer (born 1985)

Claydee Lupa
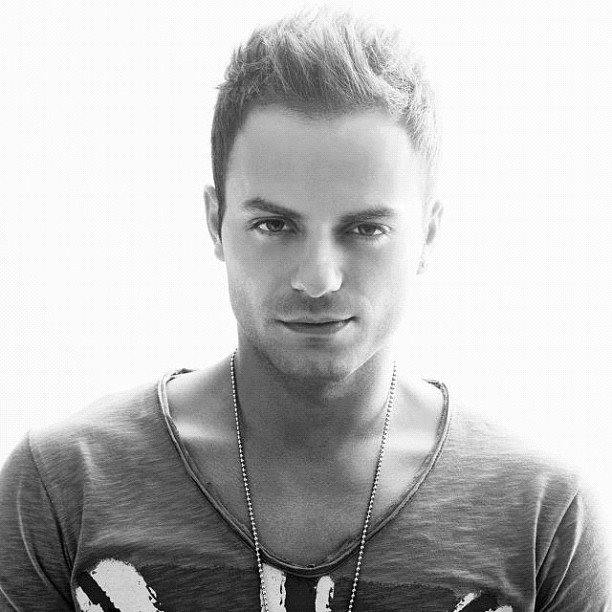
- Claydee Lupa
- Born: Klejdi Lupa; 7 June 1985 (age 41); Tirana, Albania
- Other name: Claydee
- Musical career
- Genres: Pop; dance-pop; house; RnB
- Occupations: Producer; singer; songwriter; music executive
- Instrument: Vocals
- Years active: 2008–present
- Labels: Down2Earth Music; Ultra Music; Sony; Minos-EMI; Universal
- Website: claydee.com

Klejdi Lupa (Greek: Κλέιντι Λούπα; born 7 June 1985), known professionally as Claydee, is a Greek and Albanian singer, songwriter and producer. He has produced works that fall into the dance-pop, RnB and house music categories. His songs have charted as Top 10 hits in countries such as Greece, Spain, Serbia, Russia, Poland, Cyprus and Albania. His songs have also surpassed 582 million streams and YouTube views combined.

== Life and career ==
Lupa was born in Tirana, People's Socialist Republic of Albania (present-day Albania) and moved to Athens, Greece, with his family at the age of four. Graduating from high school, he pursued a degree in Audio Engineering at SAE (International Technology College) that he completed in 2006. A year later, he obtained a BA in Recording Arts from Middlesex University. After concluding his degrees, in 2008, he went on to work at MTV Greece.

Lupa released his first personal track "Call Me" which was awarded the Best Dance Video Clip at the MAD Video Music Awards in 2011. His second track, "Deep Inside", was a pop-dance track. In the summer of 2012 he released the international hit "Mamacita Buena" which became the first song produced in Greece to surpass 20 million views on YouTube and reached No.1 at the airplay chart in Greece while simultaneously being released internationally by Ultra Music. The song was also featured in the NBC TV series Telenovela, which stars Eva Longoria. He was nominated for Best Greek Act Award at the MTV Europe Music Awards.

His single "Sexy Papi" reached the No.1 in the airplay charts in countries such as Greece, Poland and Serbia while Coca-Cola in Greece chose him to go on tour with the brand for the summer of 2013. He performed in a number of countries, including Cyprus, Albania, Serbia, Poland, Romania, Russia, Canada, United States, Sweden and Italy and at Athens Arena.

In 2010, Claydee co-created "Down2Earth Music", a music industry consulting and artist development company, with his friend Evan Klimakis. It launched Down2Earth Records, a mainstream dance label. Since then, the label has amassed on the YouTube channel over 1 billion views and 1 million subscribers.

In 2015, Lupa released the song "Utopia" with his side project Bang La Decks. The song was featured in the video game FIFA 15 and the TV series Power and Teen Wolf. An adaptation of the song titled "How Bad Do You Want It" with vocals by Sevyn Streeter was also included in the soundtrack for the film Furious 7.

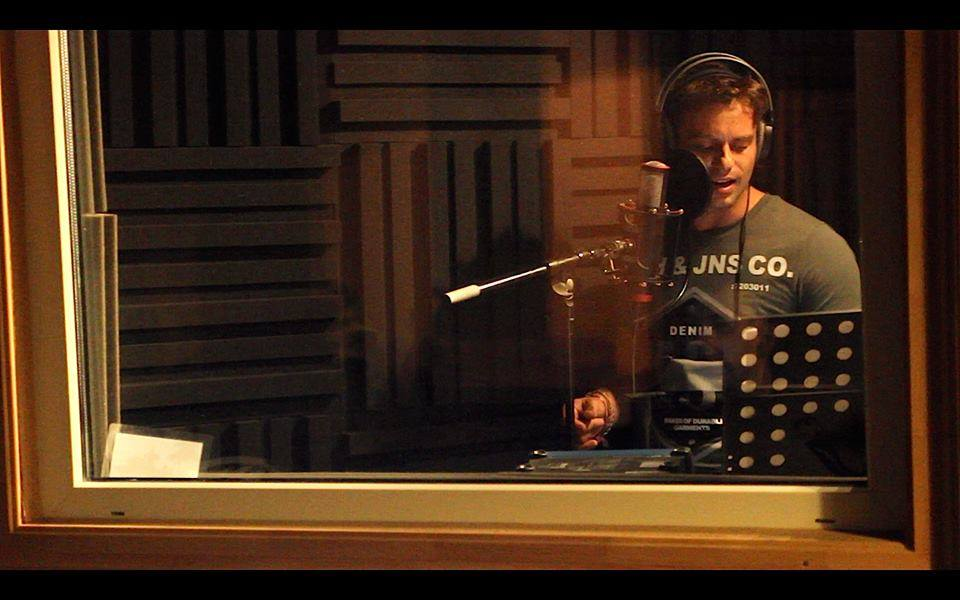
Claydee recording his new album in 2013

In 2018, Lupa released the song "Later Bitches" with his musical side project The Prince Karma. It reached #12 on the Worldwide Shazam Chart and amassed more than 150 million Spotify streams. The song was later used for the beer company Desperados' "We Are the Party" advertising campaign in 2020. It was eventually certified Platinum in France and Gold in Germany.

Claydee collaborated with Greek singer Eleni Foureira on the song "Loquita" in 2019. The song won the "Best Duet" award at the MAD Video Music Awards in 2020.

Claydee released the single "Detente" in 2021. The song became viral on TikTok, amassing more than 9 million views.

Claydee collaborated with Greek singer Josephine on the song "Babe ti Exeis?"

== Producer and songwriter ==
Experience he gained while working for MTV Greece led to work as a producer and a songwriter, under his alias Beetkraft, beginning with the song "The End" by Reckless, which was released by Sony Music Greece and reached a top-rank position in the UK Club Charts. He went on to write and produce, under his real name, "Last Summer" sung by Nikos Ganos, the Track of the Year at the 2011 MAD TV Awards. The track was released by Heaven Music in Greece and in 35 countries internationally.

In 2011, he co-wrote "Tonight" with Playmen, sung by Tamta, which reached No.1 in the airplay charts in Greece. Songs under his alias Beetkraft include "Agries diatheseis" by Kostas Martakis, "Niose tin Kardia" by Tamta (in which he raps as well) and "To allo sou miso" for Sakis Rouvas, featured in his double platinum album Parafora.

== Personal life ==
Some years after his establishment in Greece, Lupa legally took the name Nikodimos. He is also a professional Latin dancer. He has a son, born in 2016.

== Awards ==
Association	Nominee / Work	Year	Award	Result
Mad Video Music Awards	"Call Me" (with Dimension-X)	2011	Best Video Clip – Dance	Won
Mad Video Music Awards	"Do It"	2014	Best Video Clip – Dance	Won
Mad Video Music Awards	"Do It"	2014	Best Dance Act in Video Clip	Nominated
Mad Video Music Awards	"Loquita" (with Eleni Foureira)	2020	Best Duet	Won

== Discography ==
=== Producer and Songwriter ===
Year	Work
2008	Christos Hatzinasios and Nancy Alexiadi – "Kakomathimeno"
2009	Taki Tsan – "Akoma Zontanos"
2010	Nikos Ganos – "Last Summer"
2010	Reckless – "The End"
2010	Sakis Rouvas – "To allo sou miso"
2011	Beetkraft ft.Rukus – "Player"
2011	Kostas Martakis – "Agries diatheseis"
2011	Stratos STAN Antipariotis – "Taxidepse Me"
2011	Dimension X feat. Nikki Ponte – "Hey You"
2011	Dimension X – "Na m'agapas"
2011	Playmen & Claydee feat. Tamta – "Tonight"
2012	Tamta – "Niose tin kardia"
2012	Dimension X – "Thelo"
2012	Katerina Stikoudi – "Mi"
2012	Nikki Lee – "Chiki Chiki"
2013	Nikki Lee – "Heleya"
2013	Eleftheria Eleftheriou – "Teliosame"
2014	Eleftheria Eleftheriou – "Gia Sena"
2019	Eleni Foureira – "Barcelona"
2019	Era Istrefi feat. Nora Istrefi – "Nuk E Di"
2020	El Capon – "Shut Up Chicken" (co-written with Basshunter, Thomas Jules and Ilkay Sencan)
2020	Eleni Foureira – "Yayo"
2022	Josephine - Kathrefti Kathreftaki Mou

=== Claydee Singles ===
Year	Song
2010	Call Me
2011	Deep Inside
2012	Mamacita Buena
2013	Sexy Papi
2013	Watching Over You – featuring Dimension X
2013	Do It – featuring Ruby
2014	Hey Ma – featuring Alex Velea
2014	Because Of You – featuring Katie Bell
2015	Who – featuring Faydee
2015	Te Quiero – featuring Dave Audé
2016	Alena
2017	Notayo featuring Kirsten Collins
2017	Dame Dame featuring Lexy Panterra
2018	Licky featuring Jenn Morel
2019	Gitana featuring Lil Eddie
2019	Loquita featuring Eleni Foureira
2020	Rikita featuring Mente Fuerte
2021	Como Te Llamas
2021	Detente
2021	La Luna y Tu featuring Smiley
2021	Culo
2021	Dirty (On The Phone)
2021	Tequila
2021	Awoof featuring Emy Perez
2022	Mamma Mia featuring ALMA
2023	Babe ti Exeis with Josephine
2023	Toca Toca with Evangelia
2023	If You Never with Eneli and Kállay Saunders

=== As The Prince Karma ===
Year	Song
2018	Later Bitches
2019	No More
2020	Superstar
2020	Rick James
2020	It's The DJ featuring Ron Carroll
2021	I Wanna Know What Love Is
2021	I'll Be There featuring Dawty Music

=== Work with Bang La Decks ===
Year	Song
2012	Kuedon (Obsession)
2014	Zouka
2015	Utopia
2015	Aide
2016	Montego
2016	Okinawa
2016	Baracoa
2018	Krepale
2020	GQOM
