= Tómame =

Single by Eleni Foureira
- Language: English, Spanish
- Released: 2018
- Genre: Pop
- Length: 2:48
- Label: Panik • Sony Music
- Songwriters: Markus Videsäter, Geraldo Sandell, Eleni Foureira, Alex Papaconstantinou
- Producers: Didrick, Markus Videsäter, Alex Papaconstantinou

Eleni Foureira singles chronology
"Caramela" (2018)	"Tómame" (2018)	"Triumph" (2019)

''Tόmame" is a song by Greek singer Eleni Foureira.

== Personnel ==
- Written by: Alex P (BMG Publishing), Geraldo Sandell (Teddy Sky Songs), Markus Videsäter, Eleni Foureira
- Produced by: Alex P, Markus Videsäter, Didrick
- Backing vocals by: Teddy Sky
- All instruments by: Alex P, Markus Videsäter
- Mixed and Mastered by: Kevin Grainger at Wired Masters

== Charts ==
Chart (2019)	Peak position
Greece (Digital Single Chart)	1

== Release history ==
Region	Date	Format	Label
Various	12 October 2019	Digital download; streaming	Down2Earth; Panik Records
