= Loquita =

2019 single by Eleni Foureira and Claydee

- Official cover of "Loquita"

Single by Eleni Foureira and Claydee
- Language: Spanish
- Released: 5 July 2019
- Length: 2:50
- Label: Down2Earth; Panik Records
- Songwriters: Berto Lazaropoulos; Eleni Foureira; Klejdi Llupa; Emy Perez
- Producers: Claydee; Ted Economou

Eleni Foureira singles chronology
"El Ritmo Psicodélico" (2019)	"Loquita" (2019)	"Yayo" (2020)

Claydee singles chronology
"Trabajar" (2019)	"Loquita" (2019)	"Rikita" (2020)

Music video
- "Loquita" on YouTube

"Loquita" is a song recorded by Greek singer Eleni Foureira and Greek-Albanian singer and songwriter Claydee.

== Personnel ==
Credits adapted from Tidal.

- Eleni Foureira – performing, producing, songwriting, vocals
- Klejdi Llupa – composing, performing, producing, songwriting, vocals

== Charts ==
Chart (2019)	Peak position
Greece (Digital Single Chart)	1

== Release history ==
Region	Date	Format	Label	Ref.
Various	5 July 2019	Digital download; streaming	Down2Earth; Panik Records	
