= Vasilissa (album) =

- Standard cover

Studio album by Eleni Foureira
- Released: 11 December 2017
- Genre: Pop
- Length: 43:13
- Language: Greek, English
- Label: Panik Records

Eleni Foureira chronology
Anemos Agapis (2014)	Vasilissa (2017)	Gyspy Woman (2019)

Singles from Vasilissa
- 1. "Pio Dynata" Released: 3 June 2015; 2. "Sto Theo Me Paei" Released: 6 July 2015; 3. "Den Sou Xrostao Agapi" Released: 29 February 2016; 4. "Ti Koitas (feat. MIKE)" Released: 1 July 2016; 5. "Mono Gia Sena" Released: 21 March 2017; 6. "To Kati Pou Eheis" Released: 5 July 2017

Singles from Fuego
- 1. "Fuego" Released: 3 March 2018

Singles from Vasilissa (Platinum Edition)
- 1. "Caramela (Greek version)" Released: 28 June 2018

Vasilissa (Greek: Βασίλισσα) is the fourth studio album by Greek singer Eleni Foureira and her first album release with Panik Records. The album was released on 11 December 2017. The album is certified platinum in Greece. The album was reissued twice in 2018, once as Fuego (titled after Foureira's 2018 Eurovision entry "Fuego", which finished in second place in the competition) and later as Vasilissa (Platinum Edition).

== Re-editions ==
=== Fuego ===
The first re-edition of the Vasilissa album was called Fuego, with Foureira's song "Fuego", her entry at the 2018 Eurovision Song Contest competing for Cyprus, and its instrumental and karaoke versions added. The re-edition was released on May 24, 2018. This version has not been uploaded to any streaming services, however, all songs are available to stream.

=== Vasilissa (Platinum Edition) ===
Vasilissa (Platinum Edition) is the second re-edition of the album and was released on 17 December 2018, following the platinum certification of the original album. It includes her Eurovision Song Contest 2018 hit song "Fuego", her 2018 summer hit "Caramela" as well as her Christmas song, "2019 S'Agapo", a re-edition of "2018 S'Agapo" (which was included in the standard edition of Vasilissa). Additionally, the "Fuego" (Spanish version) and the "Fuego" (Playmen Festival Remix) were included as well, bringing the song total of the album to 16. The standard edition has 11 tracks on its digital form and 12 in its physical form as her song, "Send For Me" with AM Sniper and Afro B is included on the physical CD. This version is so far only available in its physical form, as Eleni Foureira's label, Panik Records, has not uploaded this version of the album to any streaming services of now. All songs from the album have however been released and are available to stream from their individual releases as singles.

== Track listings ==
Vasilissa standard physical edition
No.	Title	Writer(s)	Producer(s)	Length
1.	"Vasilissa"	Vangelis Konstantinidis	Giannis Fraseris	3:49
2.	"To Kati Pou Eheis"	Phoebus	Phoebus; Alex Leon	4:51
3.	"Sto Theo Me Paei"	Doron Medalie; Vaggelis Konstantinidis	Yinon Yahel	3:07
4.	"Pio Dynata"	Konstantinos Kraniotis; Gavriil Gavriilidis; Midenistis	Alex Leon	3:29
5.	"Den Sou Hrostao Agapi"	Olga Vlachopoulou	Giorgos Papadopoulos	3:17
6.	"Ti Koitas" (featuring MIKE)	Doron Medalie; Vangelis Konstantinidis; MIKE	Alex Leon	3:57
7.	"2018 S'Agapo"	Terry Petras; Valentino; Christodoulos Siganos	Christodoulos Siganos	2:59
8.	"Mono Gia Sena"	Vicky Gerothodorou	DiGi; PieM	3:13
9.	"Send For Me" (with AM Sniper and Afro B)	Andre Lyon; AM SNiper; Louis Chiwota; Marcello Valenzano; Afro B	Cool & Dre; AM Sniper; Afro B; Louis Chiwota	3:24
10.	"Ladies - Stand Up"	Gavriil Gavriilidis	Alex Leon	4:42
11.	"Come Tiki Tam"	Doron Medalie	Alex Leon	3:08
12.	"Follow the Sunrise"	DiGi; PieM	Courtney Parker; Andy Nicolas	3:13
Total length:				43:13

Vasilissa standard digital edition
No.	Title	Writer(s)	Producer(s)	Length
1.	"Vasilissa"	Vangelis Konstantinidis	Giannis Fraseris	3:49
2.	"To Kati Pou Eheis"	Phoebus	Phoebus; Alex Leon	4:51
3.	"Sto Theo Me Paei"	Doron Medalie; Vaggelis Konstantinidis	Yinon Yahel	3:07
4.	"Pio Dynata"	Konstantinos Kraniotis; Gavriil Gavriilidis; Midenistis	Alex Leon	3:29
5.	"Den Sou Hrostao Agapi"	Olga Vlachopoulou	Giorgos Papadopoulos	3:17
6.	"Ti Koitas" (featuring MIKE)	Doron Medalie; Vangelis Konstantinidis; MIKE	Alex Leon	3:57
7.	"2018 S'Agapo"	Terry Petras; Valentino; Christodoulos Siganos	Christodoulos Siganos	2:59
8.	"Mono Gia Sena"	Vicky Gerothodorou	DiGi; PieM	3:13
9.	"Ladies - Stand Up"	Gavriil Gavriilidis	Alex Leon	4:42
10.	"Come Tiki Tam"	Doron Medalie	Alex Leon	3:08
11.	"Follow the Sunrise"	DiGi; PieM	Courtney Parker; Andy Nicolas	3:13
Total length:				39:49

Fuego (only physical)
No.	Title	Writer(s)	Producer(s)	Length
1.	"Fuego"	Didrick; Anderz Wrethov; Viktor Svensson; Geraldo Sandell; Alex Papaconstantinou	Didrick; Viktor Svensson; Alex Papaconstantinou	3:03
2.	"Fuego (Instrumental)"	Didrick; Anderz Wrethov; Viktor Svensson; Geraldo Sandell; Alex Papaconstantinou	Didrick; Viktor Svensson; Alex Papaconstantinou	3:03
3.	"Fuego (Karaoke)"	Didrick; Anderz Wrethov; Viktor Svensson; Geraldo Sandell; Alex Papaconstantinou	Didrick; Viktor Svensson; Alex Papaconstantinou	3:03
4.	"Vasilissa"	Vangelis Konstantinidis	Giannis Fraseris	3:49
5.	"To Kati Pou Eheis"	Phoebus	Phoebus; Alex Leon	4:51
6.	"Sto Theo Me Paei"	Doron Medalie; Vaggelis Konstantinidis	Yinon Yahel	3:07
7.	"Pio Dynata"	Konstantinos Kraniotis; Gavriil Gavriilidis; Midenistis	Alex Leon	3:29
8.	"Den Sou Hrostao Agapi"	Olga Vlachopoulou	Giorgos Papadopoulos	3:17
9.	"Ti Koitas" (featuring MIKE)	Doron Medalie; Vangelis Konstantinidis; MIKE	Alex Leon	3:57
10.	"2018 S'Agapo"	Terry Petras; Valentino; Christodoulos Siganos	Christodoulos Siganos	2:59
11.	"Mono Gia Sena"	Vicky Gerothodorou	DiGi; PieM	3:13
12.	"Send For Me" (with AM Sniper and Afro B)	Andre Lyon; AM SNiper; Louis Chiwota; Marcello Valenzano; Afro B	Cool & Dre; AM Sniper; Afro B; Louis Chiwota	3:24
13.	"Ladies - Stand Up"	Gavriil Gavriilidis	Alex Leon	4:42
14.	"Come Tiki Tam"	Doron Medalie	Alex Leon	3:08
15.	"Follow the Sunrise"	DiGi; PieM	Courtney Parker; Andy Nicolas	3:13
Total length:				52:49

Vasilissa (Platinum Edition) (only physical)
No.	Title	Writer(s)	Producer(s)	Length
1.	"Fuego"	Didrick; Anderz Wrethov; Viktor Svensson; Geraldo Sandell; Alex Papaconstantinou	Didrick; Viktor Svensson; Alex Papaconstantinou	3:03
2.	"Caramela (Greek Version)"	Avi Ohayon; Doron Medalie; Moshe Peretz; Eleni Foureira; Sofia Papavasileiou	Yinon Yahel	4:01
3.	"Vasilissa"	Vangelis Konstantinidis	Giannis Fraseris	3:49
4.	"To Kati Pou Eheis"	Phoebus	Phoebus; Alex Leon	4:51
5.	"Sto Theo Me Paei"	Doron Medalie; Vaggelis Konstantinidis	Yinon Yahel	3:07
6.	"Pio Dynata"	Konstantinos Kraniotis; Gavriil Gavriilidis; Midenistis	Alex Leon	3:29
7.	"Den Sou Hrostao Agapi"	Olga Vlachopoulou	Giorgos Papadopoulos	3:17
8.	"Ti Koitas" (featuring MIKE)	Doron Medalie; Vangelis Konstantinidis; MIKE	Alex Leon	3:57
9.	"2019 S'Agapo"	Terry Petras; Valentino; Christodoulos Siganos	Christodoulos Siganos	2:59
10.	"Mono Gia Sena"	Vicky Gerothodorou	DiGi; PieM	3:13
11.	"Send For Me" (with AM Sniper and Afro B)	Andre Lyon; AM SNiper; Louis Chiwota; Marcello Valenzano; Afro B	Cool & Dre; AM Sniper; Afro B; Louis Chiwota	3:24
12.	"Ladies - Stand Up"	Gavriil Gavriilidis	Alex Leon	4:42
13.	"Come Tiki Tam"	Doron Medalie	Alex Leon	3:08
14.	"Follow the Sunrise"	DiGi; PieM	Courtney Parker; Andy Nicolas	3:13
15.	"Fuego (Spanish Version)"	Didrick; Anderz Wrethov; Viktor Svensson; Geraldo Sandell; Alex Papaconstantinou; Edwin "Lil Eddie" Serrano; Natalis Ruby Rubero	Didrick; Viktor Svensson; Alex Papaconstantinou	3:03
16.	"Fuego (Playmen Festival Remix)"	Didrick; Anderz Wrethov; Viktor Svensson; Geraldo Sandell; Alex Papaconstantinou	Playmen; Didrick; Viktor Svensson; Alex Papaconstantinou	3:14
Total length:				56:34

== Music videos ==
Song	Year
"Pio Dynata"	2015
"Sto Theo Me Paei"	2015
"Den Sou Hrostao Agapi"	2016
"Ti Koitas (feat. MIKE)"	2016
"Mono Gia Sena"	2017
"To Kati Pou Eheis"	2017
"Send For Me (with AM Sniper & Afro B)"	2017
"Vasilissa"	2017
"2018 S'Agapo"	2017
"Fuego"	2018
"Caramela (Greek Version)"	2018

=== Lyric videos ===
Song	Year
"Ladies (Stand Up)"	2015
"Sto Theo Me Paei"	2015
"Ti Koitas (feat. MIKE)"	2016
"Fuego (Spanish Version)"	2018
"2019 S'Agapo"	2018

== Live performances ==
Song	Year	Event
"Ladies - Stand Up"	2015	MAD Walk
"Sto Theo Me Paei"	2015	MAD VMA
"Den Sou Hrostao Agapi"	2016	MAD Walk
"Ti Koitas (feat. MIKE)"	2016	MAD VMA
"Follow the Sunrise"	2017	MAD Walk
"To Kati Pou Eheis"	2017	MAD VMA
"To Kati Pou Eheis"	2017	Super Music Awards
"Fuego"	2018	Eurovision Song Contest 2018 first semi-final
"Fuego"	2018	Eurovision Song Contest 2018 final
"Fuego (Playmen Festival Remix)"	2018	MAD VMA
"Fuego"	2018	Super Music Awards
"Fuego"	2018	Madrid Pride
"Fuego"	2018	Stockholm Pride
"Fuego"	2018	Amsterdam Pride
"Fuego"	2018	Los 40
"Fuego"	2019	Het Grote Songfestivalfeest

== Certifications ==
Region	Certification
Greece (IFPI)	Platinum

== Release history ==
Edition	Release date	Format	Label
Vasilissa	11 December 2017	Digital download (11 tracks) CD (12 tracks)	Panik
Fuego	24 May 2018	CD (15 tracks)	Panik, A-P
Vasilissa (Platinum Edition)	18 December 2018	CD (16 tracks)	Panik, A-P
