= Caramela =

Eleni Foureira song

Single by Eleni Foureira

from the album Vasilissa (Platinum Edition)
- Language: Greek
- Released: June 28, 2018
- Genre: Pop
- Length: 2:48
- Label: Panik
- Songwriters: Avi Ohayon, Doron Medalie, Moshe Peretz, Eleni Foureira, Sofia Papavasileiou
- Producer: Yinon Yahel

Eleni Foureira singles chronology
"Fuego" (2018)	"Caramela" (2018)	"Tómame" (2018)

"Caramela" (Καραμέλα, caramel) is a Greek-language song by Greek singer Eleni Foureira and a single from the platinum edition of her fourth studio album, Vasilissa.

== Personnel ==
- Music: Doron Medalie, Moshe Peretz, Avi Ochayon
- Lyrics: Sofia Papavasileiou, Eleni Foureira
- Direction: Pierros Andrakakos
- Photography: Giannis Daskalothanasis
- Montage: Lydia Antonova
- Production: View Master Films

== Charts ==
Chart (2019)	Peak position
Greece (Digital Single Chart)	1

== Release history ==
Region	Date	Format	Label
Various	1 August 2019	Digital download; streaming	Down2Earth; Panik Records
