= Eleni Foureira (album) =

Studio album by Eleni Foureira
- Released: 26 November 2010
- Studio: 101 School
- Genre: Pop
- Length: 34:48
- Language: Greek
- Label: Minos EMI

Eleni Foureira chronology
Eleni Foureira (2010)	Ti Poniro Mou Zitas (2012)

Singles from Eleni Foureira
- 1. "Mia Nychta Mono" Released: 2010; 2. "Chica Bomb (Mad VMA 2010 Version)" Released: 2010; 3. "To 'cho" Released: 2010

Eleni Foureira (Greek: Ελένη Φουρέιρα) is the first studio album by Greek singer Eleni Foureira. The album was released in Greece on 26 November 2010 by Universal Music Greece. The album was reissued only once on the 2011 New Year's Eve newspaper issue by Proto Thema, on 31 December 2010.

== Singles ==
Eleni Foureira includes "Mia Nychta Mono", her 2nd solo single ever that featured Thirio. This was the first single from the album to be released on 6 May 2010. On 14 June, at the Mad Video Music Awards 2010, Eleni debuted the 2nd single from the album which was a remix of Dan Balan's "Chica Bomb", which was put on streaming services 5 days later. Then, on 24 September 2010, Foureira performed on the ANODOS stage and debuted "To 'cho (Pom Pom)", which was released on streaming services just 4 days later. To'cho's music video set was the same set used in the album's photoshoot.

== Reissues ==
The album was reissued in a jacket case – different from the standard edition's jewel case – on 31 December 2010, including one less track than the original edition. The reissue also included a different barcode and a modified back cover to include the Proto Thema logo. The CD's label was also modified to include a different barcode and the Proto Thema logo. This reissue was only on physical CDs, and not available on streaming services.

The track count in this reissue was only 9, as "Ase Me" was not included in the CD.

== Track listing ==
Standard physical edition track listing
No.	Title	Writer(s)	Producer(s)	Length
1.	"Mia Nychta Mono" (featuring Thirio)	Kostas "Thirio" Drakoulas	Giannis "Loud" Peinaras	3:47
2.	"Chica Bomb (MAD VMA 2010 Version)" (Dan Balan feat. Eleni Foureira)	Vicky Theodoridou	Dan Balan	3:33
3.	"To 'cho (Pom Pom)"	Kostas "Thirio" Drakoulas	Giannis "Loud" Peinaras	3:19
4.	"Ase Me"	Nektarios Tyrakis	Dimitri Stassos; Oscar Görres	3:28
5.	"Stavrolexo"	Nektarios Tyrakis	Dimitri Stassos; Oscar Görres	3:10
6.	"Simadia" (feat. Panagiotis Petrakis)	Melisses	Michalis Papathanasiou	3:38
7.	"Orkisou"	Giorgos Mitsigas	Michalis Papathanasiou; Kostas Charitodiplomenos	3:09
8.	"Argisame"	Kostas "Thirio" Drakoulas	Giannis "Loud" Peinaras	3:24
9.	"Vasilias Tou Chtes"	Vaggelis Serifis	Vaggelis Serifis; Dimitris Chorgianopoulos; Michalis Papathanasiou	3:15
10.	"To 'cho (Pom Pom)" (Supersize! Remix)	Kostas "Thirio" Drakoulas	Supersize!	4:00
Total length:				34:48

Proto Thema promotional edition track listing
No.	Title	Writer(s)	Producer(s)	Length
1.	"Mia Nychta Mono" (featuring Thirio)	Kostas "Thirio" Drakoulas	Giannis "Loud" Peinaras	3:47
2.	"Chica Bomb (MAD VMA 2010 Version)" (Dan Balan feat. Eleni Foureira)	Vicky Theodoridou	Dan Balan	3:33
3.	"To 'cho (Pom Pom)"	Kostas "Thirio" Drakoulas	Giannis "Loud" Peinaras	3:20
4.	"Stavrolexo"	Nektarios Tyrakis	Dimitri Stassos; Oscar Görres	3:10
5.	"Simadia" (feat. Panagiotis Petrakis)	Melisses	Michalis Papathanasiou	3:38
6.	"Orkisou"	Giorgos Mitsigas	Michalis Papathanasiou; Kostas Charitodiplomenos	3:09
7.	"Argisame"	Kostas "Thirio" Drakoulas	Giannis "Loud" Peinaras	3:24
8.	"Vasilias Tou Chtes"	Vaggelis Serifis	Vaggelis Serifis; Dimitris Chorgianopoulos; Michalis Papathanasiou	3:15
9.	"To 'cho (Pom Pom)" (Supersize! Remix)	Kostas "Thirio" Drakoulas	Supersize!	4:00
Total length:				31:21

Standard digital edition track listing
No.	Title	Writer(s)	Producer(s)	Length
1.	"Mia Nychta Mono" (featuring Thirio)	Thirio	Loud	3:46
2.	"To 'cho (Pom Pom)"	Thirio	Loud, Thirio	3:19
3.	"Ase Me"	Nektarios Tyrakis, Dimitris Stassos, Irini Michas	Dimitris Stassos, Oscar Görres, Irini Michas	3:27
4.	"Stavrolexo"	Nektarios Tyrakis, Dimitris Stassos, Irini Michas	Dimitris Stassos, Oscar Görres, Irini Michas	3:09
5.	"Simadia" (feat. Panagiotis Petrakis)	Melisses	Michalis Papathanasiou, Melisses	3:37
6.	"Orkisou"	Giorgos Mitsigas	Michalis Papathanasiou, Kostas Charitodiplomenos, Giorgos Mitsigkas	3:09
7.	"Argisame"	Thirio	Loud, Thirio	3:23
8.	"Vasilias Tou Chtes"	Vaggelis Serifis	Vaggelis Serifis, Dimitris Chorgianopoulos, Michalis Papathanasiou	3:14
9.	"To 'cho (Pom Pom)" (Supersize! Remix)	Kostas "Thirio" Drakoulas	Supersize!	4:00
Total length:				31:07

The track names on streaming services is different to the actual tracklist shown on the CD's packaging and on YouTube. Here are the changes:

Track			Track name	Streaming name	Ref
Standard CD	Promotional CD	Digital Edition	Track name	Streaming name	Ref
~~2~~	~~2~~	~~Not Included~~	~~Chica Bomb (MAD VMA 2010 Version)~~	~~Chica Bomb~~	
3	3	2	To 'cho (Pom Pom)	To 'cho (Pom Pom) - Radio Edit	
10	9	9	To 'cho (Pom Pom) [Supersize! Remix]	To 'cho (Pom Pom)	

Chica Bomb was also on streaming services for a few years, before it was taken down in 2020. It had only been available to the Greek release on streaming services.

== Chart performance ==
Chart performance for Eleni Foureira
Chart (2010)	Peak position
Greek Albums (IFPI)	1

== Certifications ==
Certifications for Eleni Foureira
Region	Certification
Greece (IFPI)	Platinum

== Release history ==
Release history and formats for Eleni Foureira
Edition	Release date	Format	Label	Refs
Standard physical edition	26 November 2010	CD (10 tracks)	Universal Music Greece	
Proto Thema promotional edition	31 December 2010	CD (9 tracks)	Universal Music Greece, Proto Thema	
Standard digital edition	1 January 2011	Digital download (9 tracks)	Universal Music Greece	
