= A!MS =

English rapper, record producer, and entrepreneur

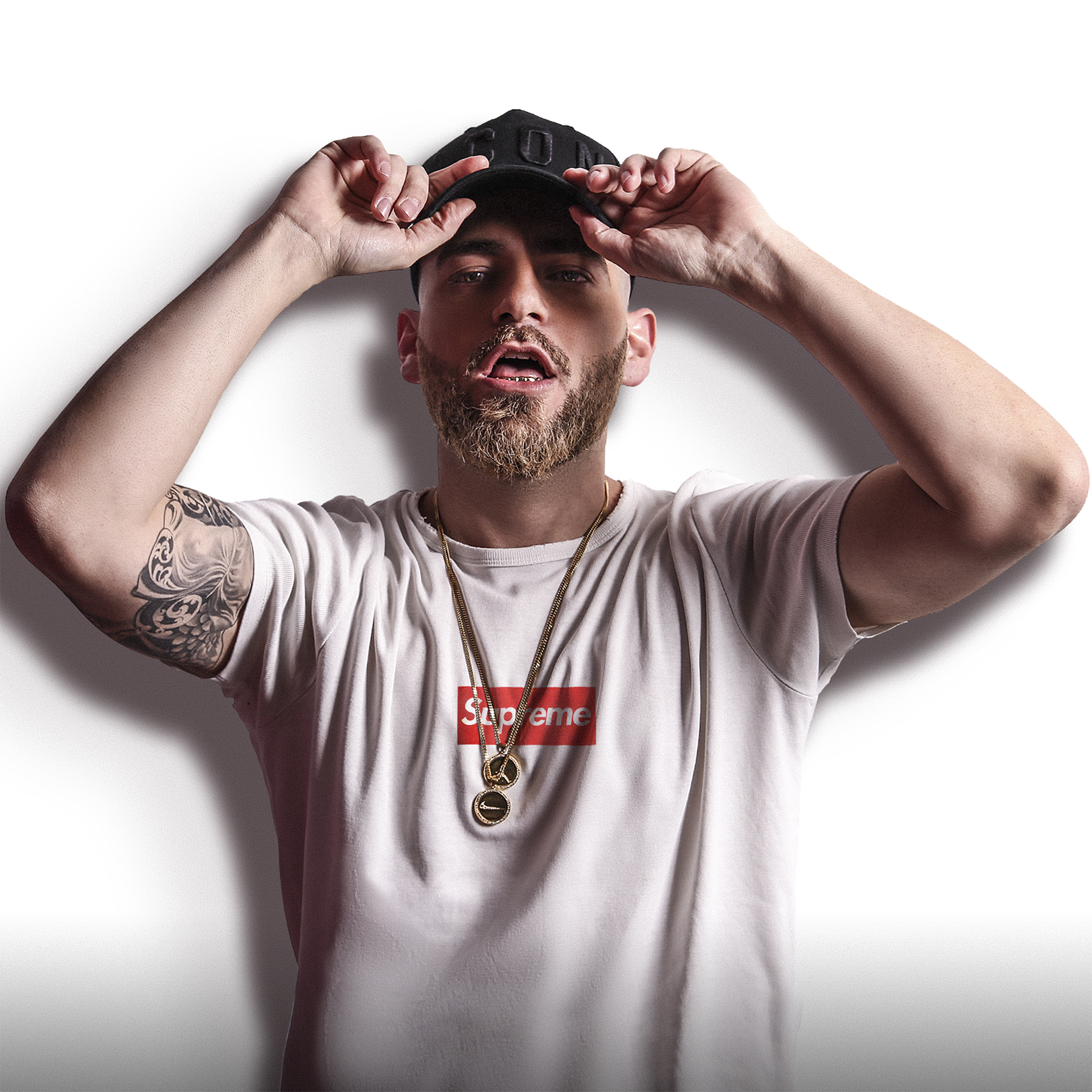
- Sniper in March 2018

Background information
- Born: Anthony Melas; England
- Genres: Hip hop; dance
- Occupations: Rapper; record producer; entrepreneur
- Years active: 2000–present
- Label: 3fifty7 Music
- Formerly of: So Solid Crew
- Website: whoisaims.com

Anthony Melas, known professionally as A!MS (pronounced "aims") and previously A.M. SNiPER, is an English rapper, record producer, and entrepreneur.

== Career ==
=== Music ===
A!MS made his debut as a member of So Solid Crew before launching his solo career. In 2018, he was nominated for the "Man of the Year" award by Cyprus' MAD magazine for his contribution to the island's music scene and the culture of Ayia Napa. He has collaborated with and produced for artists such as Cool & Dre, The Game, Oxide & Neutrino, and Wiley.

In 2020, shortly after the release of his single "Diablo", A!MS showcased part of his Ayia Napa home in an episode of Cribs, a Trace+ streaming series based on the MTV series of the same name. He was also featured in the car culture magazine Fast Car, in which he exhibited part of his collection of sports cars. In 2021, he released the single "Honor" featuring Projexx, Julian Marley, and AV Allure, which was co-produced by Cool & Dre.

On 18 July 2025, A!MS released the single "Need Somebody", in collaboration with rapper Arrdee.

== Discography ==
- 2011: 11 (EP)
- 2015: SNiPER SKiLLS MIXTAPE (with Jaguar Skills)
