= Anemos Agapis =

Studio album by Eleni Foureira
- Released: 22 December 2014
- Genre: Pop
- Length: 36:17
- Language: Greek, English
- Label: Minos-EMI

Eleni Foureira chronology
Ti Poniro Mou Zitas (2012)	Anemos Agapis (2014)	Vasilissa (2017)

Singles from Anemos Agapis
- 1. "Radevou Sti Paralia" Released: 2013; 2. "Anemos Agapis" Released: 2014; 3. "Party Sleep Repeat (P.S.R.)" Released: 2014; 4. "Tranquila with J Balvin" Released: 2014; 5. "Mou 'Pan I Agapi" Released: 2015

Anemos Agapis (Greek: Ανεμος Αγαπις) is the third studio album by Greek singer Eleni Foureira. The album was released in Greece and Cyprus on December 22, 2014 by Minos-EMI S.A.

== Singles ==
Anemos Agapis includes the singles Radevou Sti Paralia, Tranquila (with J Balvin which was Foureira's first number one in Greek), Party Sleep Repeat (PSR), which was a joint release with her new label Panik Records, and Mou 'Pan I Agapi.

== Track listing ==
Standard edition
No.	Title	Writer(s)	Producer(s)	Length
1.	"Anemos Agapis"	Niki Papatheohari	Giorgos Papadopoulos	3:41
2.	"Mou 'Pan I Agapi"	JP, Niki Papatheohari, Tzortzina Karahaliou	Soumka, JP, Tzortzina Karahaliou	4:18
3.	"Tranquila" (with J Balvin)	J Balvin	Marios Psimopoulos, Marcelo Arrieta Lung	4:05
4.	"Party Sleep Repeat (PSR)"	Phil Bentley, Vassy	Steve Daly, Blackjack	2:58
5.	"Vazo Tin Kardia"	Marios Psimopoulos, Pavlos Manolis, Vaggelis Konstantinidis	Marios Psimopoulos, Pavlos Manolis, Vaggelis Konstantinidis	3:55
6.	"To Deserve You - Alex Leon Panik Remix"	Maria McKee	Alex Leon, Maria McKee, Arrif Mardin	4:00
7.	"Sweetest Love"	Vicki Gerothodorou, Pavlos Manolis	Alex Leon, Pavlos Manolis	3:39
8.	"Radevou Sti Paralia"	Hristodoulos Siganos	Hristodoulos Siganos, Konstantinos Pantzis, Knock Out, Valentino	3:01
9.	"Pes To Kathara" (with Vasilis Karras)	Nikos Gritsis	Giorgos Sabanis	3:36
10.	"Na Taxidepsoume Mazi"	Oge	Oge, Stelios Legakis	2:59
Total length:				36:17

== Chart performance ==
Chart (2014)	Peak position
Greek Albums (IFPI)	3

Greek Airplay Chart (IFPI)	Peak position
Anemos Agapis	20
Tranquila with J Balvin	1

== Music videos ==
Title	Year	Director(s)	Reference(s)
"Sweetest Love"	2013	Apollon Papatheoxaris	
"Anemos Agapis"	2014	Apollon Papatheoxaris	
"Party Sleep Repeat (PSR)"	2014	Apollon Papatheoxaris	
"Mou 'Pan I Agapi"	2015	Yiannis Papadakos	

=== Lyric videos ===
Title	Year	Director(s)	Reference(s)
"Vazo Tin Kardia"	2014	-	
"Mou 'Pan I Agapi"	2014	Alex Gergkis	

== Release history ==
Region	Release date	Format	Label	Refs
Greece	22 December 2014	Digital download, CD	Minos-EMI S.A.	
Cyprus	22 December 2014	Digital download, CD	Minos-EMI S.A.	
