= Mad Clip =

- Born: Panagiotis Peter Anastasopoulos; May 25, 1987; New York City, U.S.
- Died: September 2, 2021 (aged 34); Vouliagmeni, Greece
- Occupations: Rapper; songwriter
- Years active: 2004–2021
- Musical career
- Genre: Hip hop
- Label: Capital Music

Panagiotis Peter Anastasopoulos (Greek: Παναγιώτης Πίτερ Αναστασόπουλος; May 25, 1987 – September 2, 2021), known professionally as Mad Clip, was an American-born Greek rapper and songwriter. He released many successful songs such as "Dealer", "Kotera", "Sinthikes", "Eimai Trelos", "Bonnie and Clyde", "Cascadeur", "Megistanas" and "Oh No", several of which have surpassed tens of millions of views on YouTube. He released four albums: Super Trapper, O Amerikanos LP, Super Trapper 2 and Still Active featuring Strat. A fifth album named “Money And Drugs Can’t Live In Poverty” was released posthumously on April 29, 2022. From the beginning of his music career he kept the artistic name Mad Clip which comes from the initials "Money and Drugs, Can't Live in Poverty".

== Early life ==
Panagiotis Peter Anastasopoulos was born on May 25, 1987, in New York City to Greek parents. From 1999 onwards, he divided his life between Greece and US for many years. When in Greece, he was living in Paleo Faliro, the birthplace of his father.

== Career ==
Mad Clip released the single Eimai Trelos at the age of 27. Shortly after he signed with Capital Music. He had been a member of Outkast Excellence O.E. since 2004 with Constantine The G and N.O.E., where he performed in English.

He had lived in Greece permanently from 2016 until his death, where he became famous, despite his ambition to succeed abroad. Mad Clip expressed his preference for luxury living with expensive cars and clothes, both privately and in his songs. He was one of the most popular singers of recent years, with many of his songs topping Greek charts. It has been reported that due to his work, Mad Clip has significantly contributed to the rise in popularity of trap music in Greece.

== Popular songs ==
Some of Mad Clip’s most popular tracks include:

- "Dealer"
- "Kotera"
- "Sinthikes"
- "Eimai Trelos"
- "Bonnie and Clyde" (with DJ Stephan)
- "Cascadeur" (with Fly Lo and Strat)
- "Megistanas" (with Ypo)
- "Oh No" (with Aspa)

== Death ==
Mad Clip died at the age of 34 on September 2, 2021, after a car accident in Vouliagmeni.

More specifically during a race between another driver.
