= Konstantinos Argyros =

Greek singer (born 1986)

Konstantinos Argiros
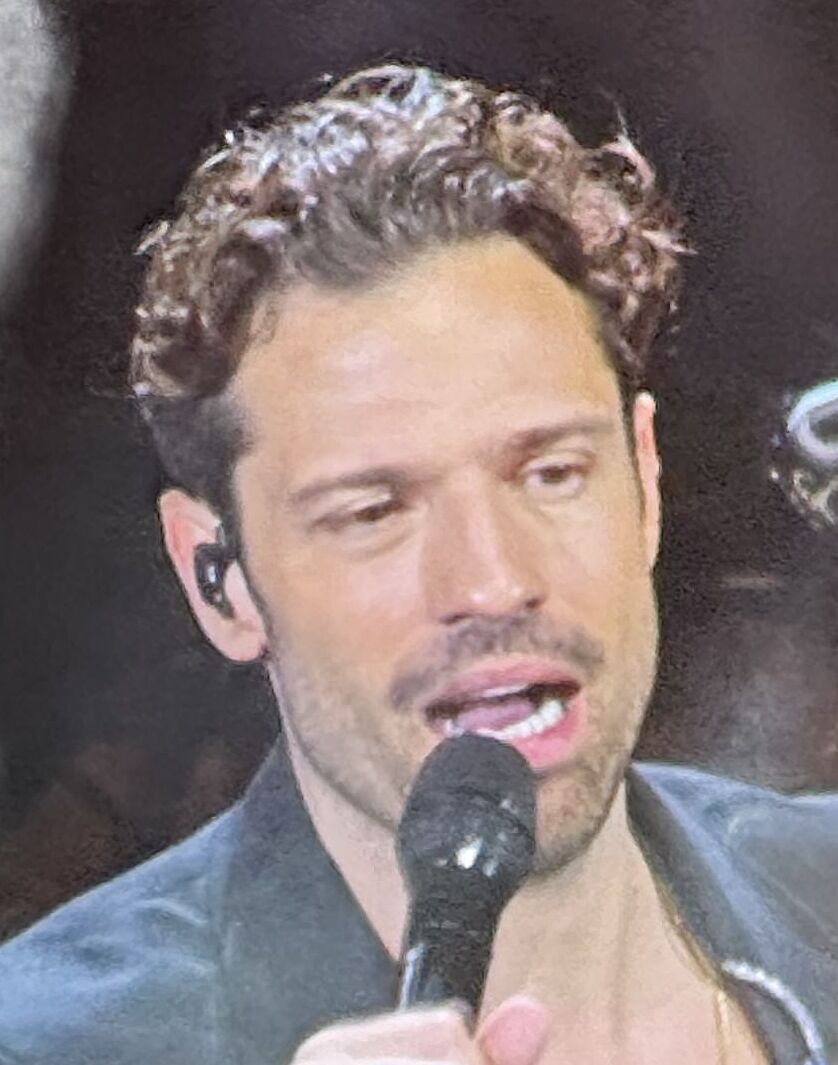
- Konstantinos Argiros in 2024.

Background information
- Born: 21 May 1986 (age 40); Ilion, Greece
- Instruments: Vocals, piano
- Years active: 2008–present

Konstantinos Argyros (Greek: Κωνσταντίνος Αργυρός [konstaˈdinos arʝiˈros]; born 21 May 1986) is a Greek singer. He is well known for his success among the Greek diaspora.

== Early life ==
Konstantinos Argyros was born and raised in Ilion, a suburb of Athens, Greece. His father, Vasilis Argyros, who originated from Lefkada, was a geologist, while his mother, Fotini Argyrou, who came from Aetolia-Acarnania, worked as a physician in the Greek public sector. He is one of three siblings and was born as part of a set of triplets. Argyros and his siblings were the first triplets in Greece to be conceived through in vitro fertilization. His sister is a lawyer, and his brother is an economist.

Argyros had enrolled to study medicine at a private university in Italy but later abandoned his studies in order to participate in the music reality television show Fame Story. At the age of five, he began his involvement with music by learning to play the piano. He later learned to play the guitar, as well as several traditional Greek musical instruments.

== Career ==
After participating in the music reality show Fame Story 3 in 2004, he began working professionally as a singer, performing at the nightclub FIX in Thessaloniki. He later moved to Athens after Nikos Vertis invited him to join his bouzoukia residency. For six years, Argyros was rejected by all major Greek record labels, despite having financial backing. In the summer of 2008, he eventually signed a recording contract with Sony BMG and released his first music project. His debut full-length studio album, titled Mallon Kati Ksero, was released in 2011.

Since then, Argyros has released multiple albums, five of which have been certified Platinum. The albums Osa Niotho (2016) and To Kati Parapano (2018) have achieved double and quadruple Platinum status, respectively. He has faced criticism for using Greek national symbols during his concerts. On March 7, 2026 Argyros was the headline act at a sold-out event at the United Center in Chicago hosted by President and CEO of Calamos Investments in honour of John Calamos Sr.

== Personal life ==
Konstantinos Argyros married Alexandra Nika in 2025. The couple met in 2023 and have one son, Vasilis, who was born in 2024. Alexandra Nika is the daughter of Giorgos Nikas, heir and former owner of the well-known Greek processed meat company Nikas, and Miranda Pateras, who comes from a prominent Greek shipping family.

Argyros is also known for his close personal friendship with Kimberly Guilfoyle, who has served as the ambassador of the Trump administration to Greece since 2025. Together with Kimberly Guilfoyle and his wife, Argyros hosted and presented the Greek premiere of Melania Trump’s documentary, Melania: Twenty Days to History.

== Discography ==
- 2011: Mallon Kati Xero
- 2012: Paidi Gennaio
- 2014: Defteri Fora
- 2016: Osa Niotho
- 2018: To Kati Parapano
- 2022: 22
- 2025: KABANES

== Awards ==
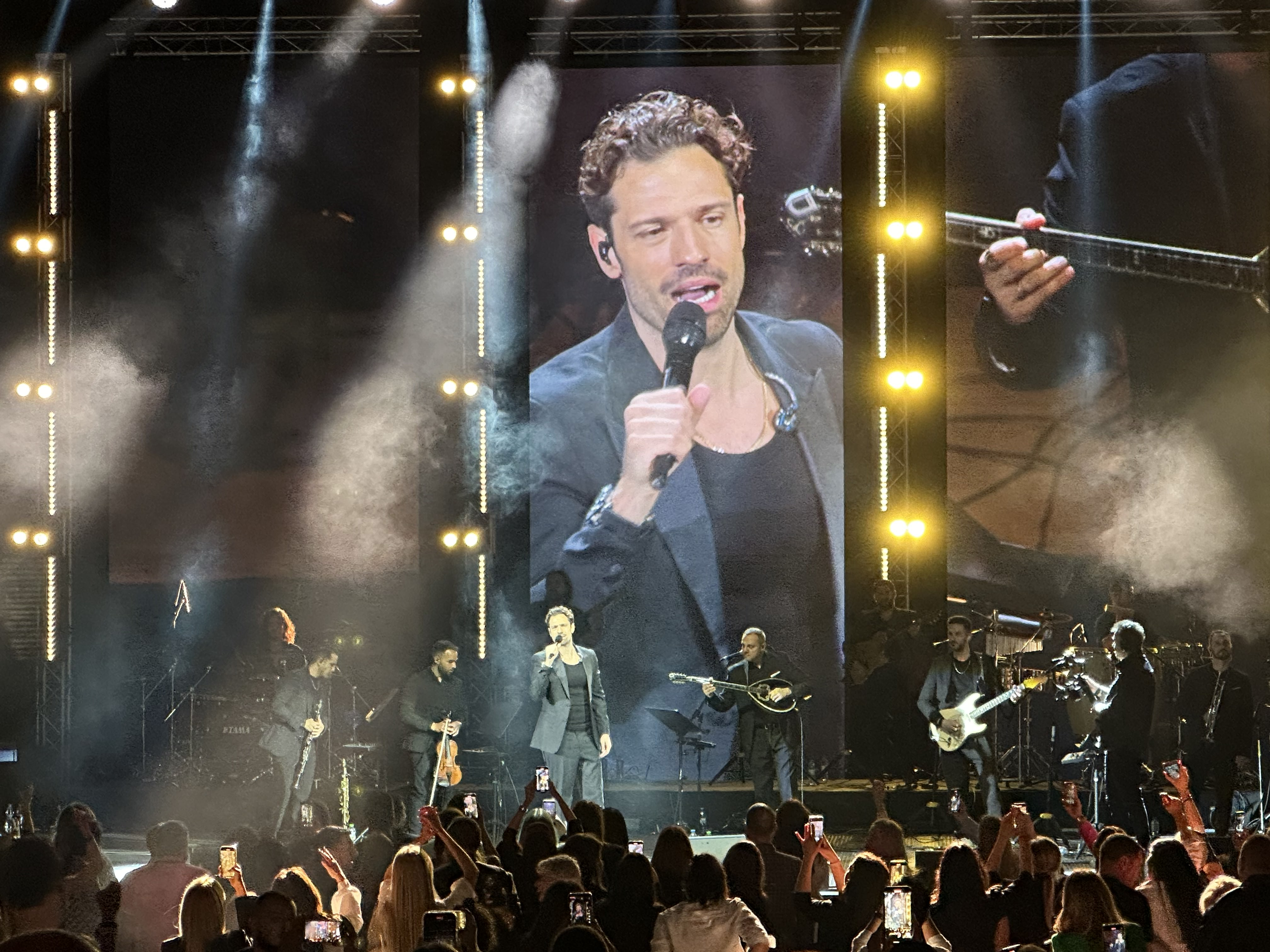
Konstantinos Argyros in Sofia, May 2024.

- MAD Video Music Award for Ποτέ Ξανά (Pote xana) (2013, won)
- MAD Video Music Award for Ξημερώματα (Ximeromata) (2018, won)
- MAD Video Music Awards (2013) - Best Song for "Ποτέ Ξανά""
- MAD Video Music Awards (2016) - BEST VIDEO MAD GREEKZ for the song "Το συμπέρασμα"
- MAD Music Cyprus (2016) - Male Artist of the Year
- Super Music Awards (2016) - Artist with the biggest Airplay Chart "Το συμπέρασμα"
- Super Music Awards (2017) - Best Folk Singer
- Super Music Awards (2018) - Favorite song of the year by SUPERFM producers
- Mad Video Music Awards (2018) - Best folk singer and song of the year (ξημερώματα)
- MAD Video Music Awards (2019) - Best Male Adult
- MAD Video Music Awards (2020) - Best Male Adult
- MAD Video Music Awards (2021) - Best Male Adult
- Best Video-Laiko (2021) - Konstantinos Argyros - Αθήνα Μου
