= MAD Video Music Awards =

Greek award show presented by the MAD TV

Mad Video Music Awards
- Country: Greece
- Presented by: MAD TV (2004–present); ANT1 (2004–2005, 2012–2014); Alpha TV (2006–2011, 2015–2019); Mega Channel (2020–present)
- First award: 2004-present
- Website: Official website

MAD Video Music Awards is a Greek award show presented by the MAD TV. The awards honor the year's biggest achievements in music, voted by the viewers of the station. Winners receive an authentic Mad designed award with the graphics of that year's show. The awards are presented by Themis Georgantas.

Top 10 artists based on number of awards
Performers	Awards	Years	Most awards in one ceremony
Helena Paparizou	34	2004-2014, 2015-2024	3 (2006, 2009, 2013)
Sakis Rouvas	26	2004, 2006-2016, 2018-2019, 2023	4 (2010)
Eleni Foureira	25	2011-2013, 2015-2025	3 (2023)
Melisses	22	2010, 2012-2025	2 (2010, 2014, 2015, 2017, 2018, 2019, 2021)
Despina Vandi	19	2005-2008, 2010, 2012, 2014-2016, 2024-2025	3 (2005, 2006)
Konstantinos Argyros	16	2013, 2016-2025	2 (2018, 2021, 2022, 2023, 2024)
Michalis Hatzigiannis	12	2004-2005, 2007-2010, 2012	4 (2007)
Anna Vissi	12	2004-2006, 2009, 2016, 2025	4 (2004)
Demy	11	2012-2017	3 (2012)
Goin' Through	7	2004-2008	2 (2005, 2007)

== History ==
The annual award ceremony takes place at the beginning of the summer, at the end of June and is broadcast on a television station, on ANT1 were broadcast from 2004 until 2005 and from 2012 until 2014, on Alpha TV were broadcast from 2006 until 2011 and from 2015 until 2019, also were broadcast on MAD TV after the television station have broadcast them. The first award ceremony took place in 2004 at the Theatro Vrahon - Melina Mercouri. The awards have been held since 2010 at the Faliro Sports Pavilion Arena, with the exception of the 11th award ceremony held at the Peace and Friendship Stadium. The 17th award, although initially canceled due to high budget and emergency measures against Coronavirus, took place on December 7–8, 2020 without the presence of the public and was broadcast on January 2, 2021, by Mega Channel.

== Award categories ==
- Album of The Year
- Video of The Year
- Viral Song
- Best New Artist
- Best Urban Video
- Best Greek Dance Video
- Best Pop Video
- Best Modern Laiko Video
- Best Ballad Video
- Best Dance Video
- Best Duet
- Airplay Song
- Best Pop Artist
- Best Performer
- Best Digital Song
- Best Laiko Artist
- Honorary Award
- Social Media Hero

== List of ceremonies ==
- Mad VMA 2004: Theatro Vrahon (Melina Mercouri Open Air Theatre), Athens (Greece: MAD TV, 1st Award)
- Mad VMA 2005: Theatro Vrahon (Melina Mercouri Open Air Theatre), Athens (Greece: MAD TV, 2nd Award)
- Mad VMA 2006: Theatro Vrahon (Melina Mercouri Open Air Theatre), Athens (Greece: MAD TV, 3rd Award)
- Mad VMA 2007: Theatro Vrahon (Melina Mercouri Open Air Theatre), Athens (Greece: MAD TV, 4th Award)
- Mad VMA 2008: Theatro Vrahon (Melina Mercouri Open Air Theatre), Athens (Greece: MAD TV, 5th Award)
- Mad VMA 2009: Theatro Vrahon (Melina Mercouri Open Air Theatre), Athens (Greece: MAD TV, 6th Award)
- Mad VMA 2010: Faliro Sports Pavilion Arena, Athens (Greece: MAD TV, 7th Award)
- Mad VMA 2011: Faliro Sports Pavilion Arena, Athens (Greece: MAD TV, 8th Award)
- Mad VMA 2012: Faliro Sports Pavilion Arena, Athens (Greece: MAD TV, 9th Award)
- Mad VMA 2013: Faliro Sports Pavilion Arena, Athens (Greece: MAD TV, 10th Award)
- Mad VMA 2014: Peace and Friendship Stadium, Athens (Greece: MAD TV, 11th Award)
- Mad VMA 2015: Faliro Sports Pavilion Arena, Athens (Greece: MAD TV, 12th Award)
- Mad VMA 2016: Faliro Sports Pavilion Arena, Athens (Greece: MAD TV, 13th Award)
- Mad VMA 2017: Faliro Sports Pavilion Arena, Athens (Greece: MAD TV, 14th Award)
- Mad VMA 2018: Faliro Sports Pavilion Arena, Athens (Greece: MAD TV, 15th Award)
- Mad VMA 2019: Faliro Sports Pavilion Arena, Athens (Greece: MAD TV, 16th Award)
- Mad VMA 2020: Enastron Live Club, Athens (Greece: MAD TV, 17th Award)
- Mad VMA 2021: Technopoli, Athens (Greece: MAD TV, 18th Award)
- Mad VMA 2022: Faliro Sports Pavilion Arena, Athens (Greece: MAD TV, 19th Award)
- Mad VMA 2023: Faliro Sports Pavilion Arena, Athens (Greece: MAD TV, 20th Award)
- Mad VMA 2024: Faliro Sports Pavilion Arena, Athens (Greece: MAD TV, 21st Award)
- Mad VMA 2025: Faliro Sports Pavilion Arena, Athens (Greece: MAD TV, 22nd Award)
