= Cyprus in the Eurovision Song Contest 2017 =

- Eurovision Song Contest 2017
- Participating broadcaster: Cyprus Broadcasting Corporation (CyBC)
- Country: Cyprus
- Selection process: Internal selection
- Announcement date: Artist: 21 October 2016; Song: 1 March 2017

Competing entry
- Song: "Gravity"
- Artist: Hovig
- Songwriter: Thomas G:son

Placement
- Semi-final result: Qualified (5th, 164 points)
- Final result: 21st, 68 points

Participation chronology

Cyprus was represented at the Eurovision Song Contest 2017 with the song "Gravity", written by Thomas G:son, and performed by Hovig. The Cypriot participating broadcaster, Cyprus Broadcasting Corporation (CyBC), internally selected its entry for the contest. The artist was announced on 21 October 2016, while the song, "Gravity", was presented to the public on 1 March 2017.

Cyprus was drawn to compete in the first semi-final of the Eurovision Song Contest which took place on 9 May 2017. Performing during the show in position 15, "Gravity" was announced among the top 10 entries of the first semi-final and therefore qualified to compete in the final on 13 May. It was later revealed that Cyprus placed fifth out of the 18 participating countries in the semi-final with 164 points. In the final, Cyprus performed in position 19 and placed twenty-first out of the 26 participating countries, scoring 68 points.

== Background ==
Prior to the 2017 contest, the Cyprus Broadcasting Corporation (CyBC) had participated in the Eurovision Song Contest representing Cyprus thirty-three times since its first entry in 1981. Its best placing was fifth, which it achieved three times: in the 1982 competition with the song "Mono i agapi" performed by Anna Vissi, in the 1997 edition with "Mana mou" performed by Hara and Andreas Constantinou, and the 2004 contest with "Stronger Every Minute" performed by Lisa Andreas. Cyprus' least successful result was in the 1986 contest when it placed last with the song "Tora zo" by Elpida, receiving only four points in total. However, its worst finish in terms of points received was when it placed second to last in the 1999 contest with "Tha'nai erotas" by Marlain Angelidou, receiving only two points. After returning to the contest in 2015 following their one-year withdrawal from the 2014 due to the 2012–13 Cypriot financial crisis and the broadcaster's budget restrictions, Cyprus has managed to qualify for the final in all of the contests it has participated in, including 2016 where the nation placed twenty-first in the final with the song "Alter Ego" performed by Minus One.

As part of its duties as participating broadcaster, CyBC organises the selection of its entry in the Eurovision Song Contest and broadcasts the event in the country. The broadcaster confirmed its intentions to participate at the 2017 contest on 19 October 2016. CyBC has used various methods to select its entry in the past, such as internal selections and televised national finals to choose the performer, song or both to compete at Eurovision. In 2015, it organised the national final Eurovision Song Project, which featured 54 songs competing in a nine-week-long process resulting in the selection of the entry through the combination of public televoting and the votes from an expert jury. CyBC opted to select the 2016 entry via an internal selection, a method which was continued for 2017.

== Before Eurovision ==
=== Internal selection ===
On 20 October 2016, it was reported that CyBC had internally selected Hovig to represent Cyprus in Kyiv. Hovig was confirmed as the Cypriot artist for the Eurovision Song Contest 2017 the following day. Hovig previously attempted to represent Cyprus at the Eurovision Song Contest in 2010 and 2015, placing third in both of the national finals with the songs "Goodbye" and "Stone in a River", respectively. In order to create his contest song, the singer collaborated with Swedish composer Thomas G:son, who has written several Eurovision entries for various countries including the Swedish Eurovision Song Contest 2012 winning song "Euphoria" and the Cypriot Eurovision Song Contest 2016 song "Alter Ego".

Hovig recorded his Eurovision entry in January 2017 in Stockholm, Sweden together with Thomas G:son. The song, "Gravity", was presented to the public on 1 March 2017 through the release of the official preview video, filmed at the CyBC Studio 3 in Nicosia and directed by Emilios Avraam, via the official Eurovision Song Contest's YouTube channel.

=== Promotion ===
Hovig made several appearances across Europe to specifically promote "Gravity" as the Cypriot Eurovision entry. On 24 December 2016, Hovig performed during the Armenian Eurovision artist selection Depi Evratesil. On 8 April 2017, Hovig performed during the Eurovision in Concert event which was held at the Melkweg venue in Amsterdam, Netherlands and hosted by Cornald Maas and Selma Björnsdóttir. On 15 April 2017, Hovig performed during the Eurovision Spain Pre-Party, which was held at the Sala La Riviera venue in Madrid, Spain.

== At Eurovision ==
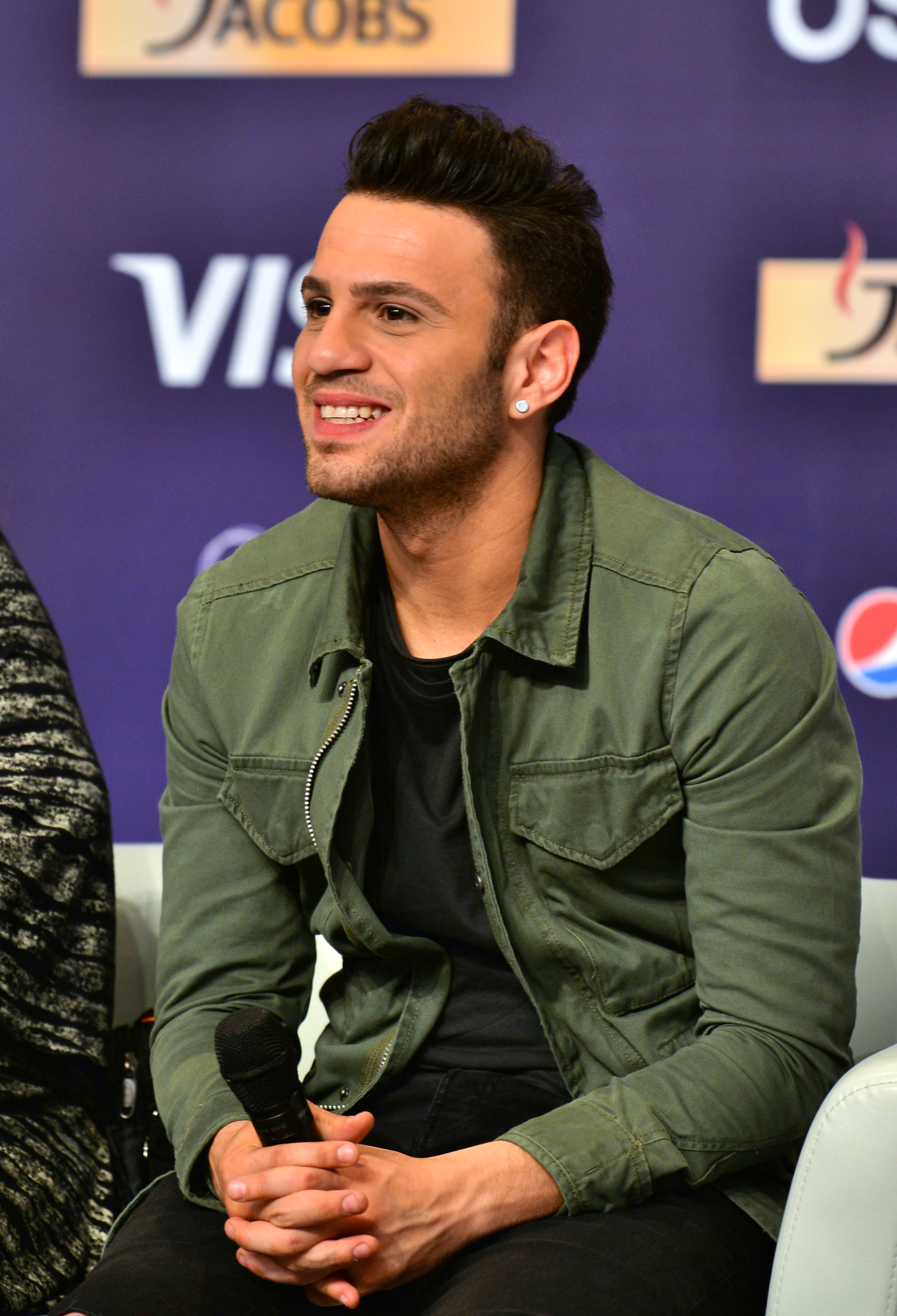
Hovig during a press meet and greet

According to Eurovision rules, all nations with the exceptions of the host country and the "Big Five" (France, Germany, Italy, Spain and the United Kingdom) are required to qualify from one of two semi-finals in order to compete for the final; the top ten countries from each semi-final progress to the final. The European Broadcasting Union (EBU) split up the competing countries into six different pots based on voting patterns from previous contests, with countries with favourable voting histories put into the same pot. On 31 January 2017, a special allocation draw was held which placed each country into one of the two semi-finals, as well as which half of the show they would perform in. Cyprus was placed into the first semi-final, to be held on 9 May 2017, and was scheduled to perform in the second half of the show.

Once all the competing songs for the 2017 contest had been released, the running order for the semi-finals was decided by the shows' producers rather than through another draw, so that similar songs were not placed next to each other. Serbia was set to open the show and perform in position 1, following the entry from the Czech Republic and before the entry from Armenia.

The two semi-finals and the final were broadcast in Cyprus on RIK 1, RIK SAT, RIK HD and Trito Programma with commentary by Tasos Tryfonos and Christiana Artemiou. The Cypriot spokesperson, who announced the top 12-point score awarded by the Cypriot jury during the final, was Giannis Karagiannis who represented Cyprus in 2015.

=== Semi-final ===
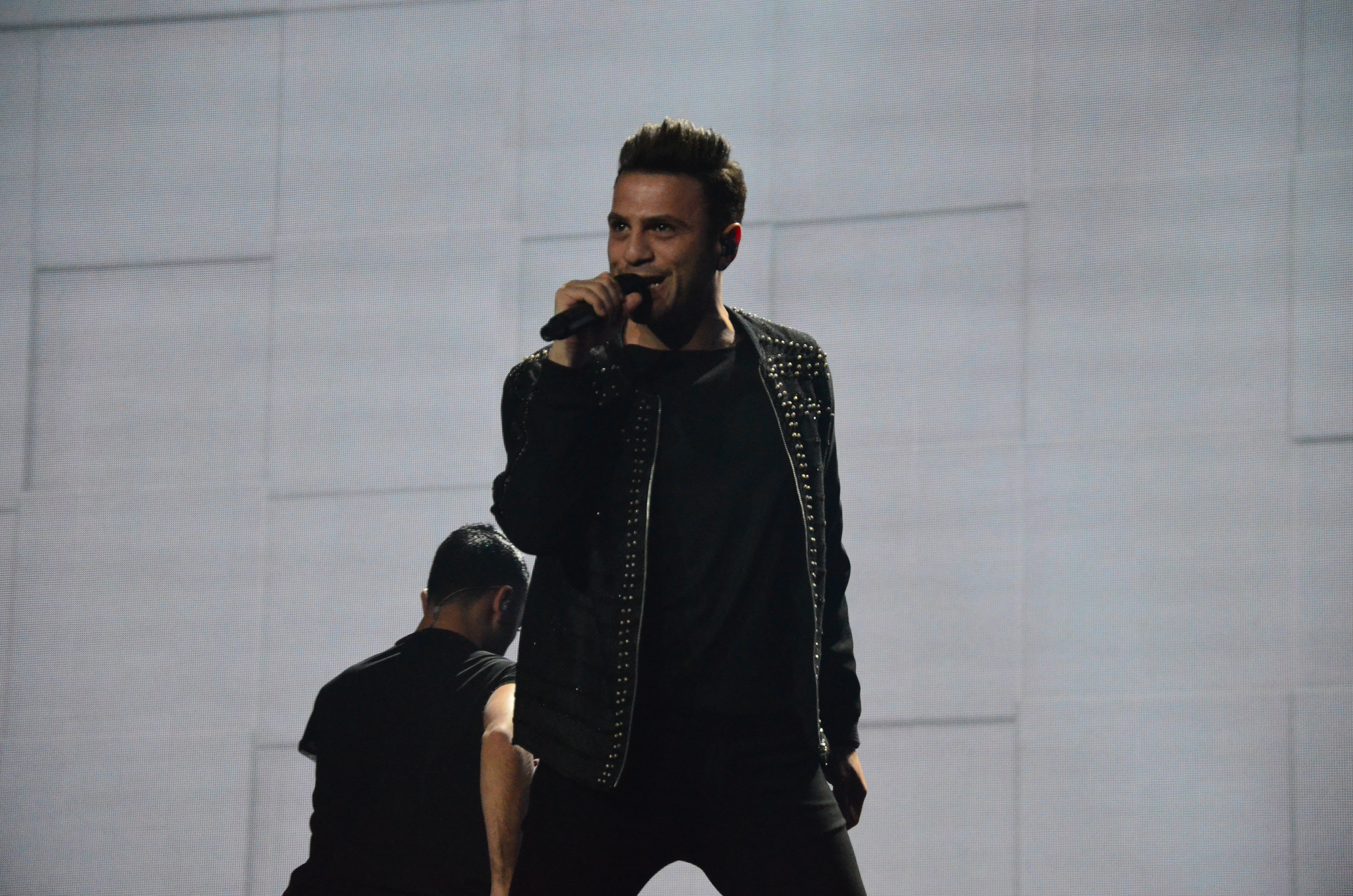
Hovig during a rehearsal before the first semi-final

Hovig took part in technical rehearsals on 1 and 4 May, followed by dress rehearsals on 8 and 9 May. This included the jury show on 8 May where the professional juries of each country watched and voted on the competing entries.

The Cypriot performance featured Hovig joined by two dancers, all of them dressed in black. At the beginning of the performance, a line appeared on the stage floor as explained by Hovig: "My song is about inviting to your life the person who keeps you on the right path. That's also the purpose of the line on stage." The performers also performed choreography which included Hovig being pushed around by his dancers. The LED screens displayed a white background that broke up into blocks. The artistic director of the performance was Haris Savva. The dancers that joined Hovig on stage were Marios Charalambous and Pavlos Lazarou, while Lars Säfsund was featured as an off-stage backing vocalist.

At the end of the show, Cyprus was announced as having finished in the top 10 and subsequently qualifying for the grand final. It was later revealed that Cyprus placed fifth in the semi-final, receiving a total of 164 points: 103 points from the televoting and 61 points from the juries.

=== Final ===
Shortly after the first semi-final, a winners' press conference was held for the ten qualifying countries. As part of this press conference, the qualifying artists took part in a draw to determine which half of the grand final they would subsequently participate in. This draw was done in the reverse order the countries appeared in the semi-final running order. Cyprus was drawn to compete in the second half. Following this draw, the shows' producers decided upon the running order of the final, as they had done for the semi-finals. Cyprus was subsequently placed to perform in position 18, following the entry from the United Kingdom and before the entry from Romania.

Minus One once again took part in dress rehearsals on 13 and 14 May before the final, including the jury final where the professional juries cast their final votes before the live show. Minus One performed a repeat of their semi-final performance during the final on 14 May. Cyprus placed twenty-first in the final, scoring 96 points: 53 points from the televoting and 43 points from the juries.

=== Voting ===
Voting during the three shows involved each country awarding two sets of points from 1-8, 10 and 12: one from their professional jury and the other from televoting. Each nation's jury consisted of five music industry professionals who are citizens of the country they represent, with their names published before the contest to ensure transparency. This jury judged each entry based on: vocal capacity; the stage performance; the song's composition and originality; and the overall impression by the act. In addition, no member of a national jury was permitted to be related in any way to any of the competing acts in such a way that they cannot vote impartially and independently. The individual rankings of each jury member as well as the nation's televoting results were released shortly after the grand final.

Below is a breakdown of points awarded to Cyprus and awarded by Cyprus in the first semi-final and grand final of the contest, and the breakdown of the jury voting and televoting conducted during the two shows:

==== Points awarded to Cyprus ====
Points awarded to Cyprus (Semi-final 1)
Score	Televote	Jury
12 points	Armenia; Greece	Armenia
10 points		
8 points		Belgium; Sweden
7 points	Georgia; Moldova; Poland	Finland
6 points	Australia; Finland; Latvia; United Kingdom	Greece
5 points	Montenegro	Czech Republic; Georgia
4 points	Belgium; Czech Republic; Iceland; Slovenia; Sweden	Iceland
3 points	Albania; Italy; Portugal	Italy; United Kingdom
2 points		
1 point		

Points awarded to Cyprus (Final)
Score	Televote	Jury
12 points	Armenia; Greece	Greece
10 points		
8 points		
7 points		Armenia
6 points		
5 points		Belgium; Finland
4 points		Georgia
3 points	Bulgaria	
2 points	Georgia; Hungary	Sweden
1 point	Montenegro	Portugal

==== Points awarded by Cyprus ====
Points awarded by Cyprus (Semi-final 1)
Score	Televote	Jury
12 points	Greece	Greece
10 points	Azerbaijan	Portugal
8 points	Armenia	Sweden
7 points	Moldova	Australia
6 points	Portugal	Finland
5 points	Sweden	Armenia
4 points	Belgium	Azerbaijan
3 points	Poland	Belgium
2 points	Australia	Poland
1 point	Georgia	Czech Republic

Points awarded by Cyprus (Final)
Score	Televote	Jury
12 points	Greece	Greece
10 points	Bulgaria	Italy
8 points	Italy	Portugal
7 points	Portugal	Bulgaria
6 points	Moldova	Sweden
5 points	Sweden	United Kingdom
4 points	Romania	Australia
3 points	France	Belgium
2 points	Belgium	France
1 point	Armenia	Azerbaijan

==== Detailed voting results ====
The following five members composed the Cypriot jury:

- Yiannis Toumazis (jury chairperson) – Director NiMAC/ Assistant Professor Frederick University/ Chair of the Board State Theater of Cyprus
- Stavros Stavrou – lyricist
- Tasos Evaggelou – radio producer, journalist
- Stella Georgiadou – performer, singer
- Eleni Sidera – radio producer, actress

Detailed voting results from Cyprus (Semi-final 1)
R/O	Country	Jury							Televote	
R/O	Country	S. Stavrou	T. Evaggelou	E. Sidera	S. Georgiadou	Y. Toumazis	Rank	Points	Rank	Points
01	Sweden	3	2	3	2	5	3	8	6	5
02	Georgia	12	17	14	14	6	14		10	1
03	Australia	6	3	2	8	8	4	7	9	2
04	Albania	15	16	16	16	17	16		17	
05	Belgium	10	9	9	10	3	8	3	7	4
06	Montenegro	17	13	17	17	16	17		16	
07	Finland	5	10	4	7	4	5	6	12	
08	Azerbaijan	4	5	7	9	12	7	4	2	10
09	Portugal	1	7	1	3	1	2	10	5	6
10	Greece	2	1	6	1	2	1	12	1	12
11	Poland	8	4	12	11	13	9	2	8	3
12	Moldova	16	11	11	4	15	12		4	7
13	Iceland	9	12	10	15	7	11		13	
14	Czech Republic	13	8	8	13	9	10	1	15	
15	Cyprus									
16	Armenia	7	6	5	6	10	6	5	3	8
17	Slovenia	14	14	13	5	14	13		14	
18	Latvia	11	15	15	12	11	15		11	

Detailed voting results from Cyprus (Final)
R/O	Country	Jury							Televote	
R/O	Country	S. Stavrou	T. Evaggelou	E. Sidera	S. Georgiadou	Y. Toumazis	Rank	Points	Rank	Points
01	Israel	14	6	16	14	13	11		15	
02	Poland	21	10	14	19	19	19		17	
03	Belarus	16	24	17	17	25	21		22	
04	Austria	9	15	8	18	20	15		19	
05	Armenia	15	13	7	20	10	12		10	1
06	Netherlands	18	23	24	4	7	17		18	
07	Moldova	25	14	18	6	11	16		5	6
08	Hungary	12	4	9	24	16	13		12	
09	Italy	1	5	3	2	4	2	10	3	8
10	Denmark	7	16	13	12	21	14		24	
11	Portugal	3	9	1	9	3	3	8	4	7
12	Azerbaijan	10	8	10	13	17	10	1	11	
13	Croatia	24	25	25	21	18	25		14	
14	Australia	11	7	4	11	14	7	4	13	
15	Greece	2	1	6	1	2	1	12	1	12
16	Spain	19	20	21	10	12	18		23	
17	Norway	20	21	23	23	23	24		21	
18	United Kingdom	4	12	2	7	8	6	5	16	
19	Cyprus									
20	Romania	23	22	20	15	9	20		7	4
21	Germany	17	19	19	22	24	22		25	
22	Ukraine	22	18	22	25	22	23		20	
23	Belgium	13	17	11	8	1	8	3	9	2
24	Sweden	6	3	5	3	15	5	6	6	5
25	Bulgaria	5	2	12	5	6	4	7	2	10
26	France	8	11	15	16	5	9	2	8	3
