= Cyprus in the Eurovision Song Contest 2009 =

- Eurovision Song Contest 2009
- Participating broadcaster: Cyprus Broadcasting Corporation (CyBC)
- Country: Cyprus
- Selection process: National final
- Selection date: 7 February 2009

Competing entry
- Song: "Firefly"
- Artist: Christina Metaxa
- Songwriters: Nikolas Metaxas

Placement
- Semi-final result: Failed to qualify (14th)

Participation chronology

Cyprus was represented at the Eurovision Song Contest 2009 with the song "Firefly", written by Nikolas Metaxas, and performed by Christina Metaxa. The Cypriot participating broadcaster, the Cyprus Broadcasting Corporation (CyBC), organised a national final in order to select its entry for the contest. The national final featured 10 entries, resulting in the selection of Metaxa with "Firefly" at the final on 7 February 2010.

Cyprus was drawn to compete in the first semi-final of the Eurovision Song Contest which took place on 14 May 2009. Performing during the show in position 7, "Firefly" was not among the 10 qualifying entries of the second semi-final and therefore did not qualify to compete in the final. It was later revealed that Cyprus placed 14th out of the 19 participating countries in the semi-final with 32 points.

== Background ==
Prior to the 2009 contest, the Cyprus Broadcasting Corporation (CyBC) had participated in the Eurovision Song Contest representing Cyprus twenty-six times since its debut in 1981. Its best placing was fifth, achieved three times: in 1982 with the song "Mono i agapi" performed by Anna Vissi, in 1997 with "Mana mou" performed by Hara and Andreas Constantinou, and in 2004 with "Stronger Every Minute" performed by Lisa Andreas. Its least successful result was in 1986 when it placed last with the song "Tora zo" by Elpida, receiving only four points in total. Its worst finish in terms of points received, however, was in 1999 when it placed second to last with "Tha'nai erotas" by Marlain Angelidou, receiving only two points. In 2008, "Femme Fatale" performed by Evdokia Kadi, failed to qualify for the final.

As part of its duties as participating broadcaster, CyBC organises the selection of its entry in the Eurovision Song Contest and broadcasts the event in the country. The broadcaster confirmed its intentions to participate at the 2009 contest on 5 October 2009. CyBC has used various methods to select its entry in the past, such as internal selections and televised national finals to choose the performer, song or both to compete at Eurovision. The broadcaster selected its 2007 entry via an internal selection. In 2008, CyBC opted to organised a national final to select the entry, a method which was continued for 2009.

== Before Eurovision ==
=== National final ===
The Cypriot national final developed by CyBC in order to select Cyprus' entry for the Eurovision Song Contest 2009 took place on 31 January 2009 at the CyBC Studio 3 in Nicosia. The show was hosted by Charis Kkolos and Maria Michail and broadcast on RIK 1, RIK Sat, Trito Programma, London Greek Radio as well as online via the broadcaster's website cybc.cy.

==== Competing entries ====
Artists and composers were able to submit their entries to the broadcaster between 10 October 2008 and 28 November 2008. All artists and songwriters were required to have Cypriot nationality, origin or residency as of 2007. At the conclusion of the deadline, 74 entries were received by CyBC. A seven-member selection committee which included two CyBC representatives shortlisted 20 entries from the received submissions, and the 10 selected entries were announced on 16 December 2008. Among the competing artists were 1995 and 2000 Cypriot Eurovision entrant Alex Panayi and 1999 Cypriot Eurovision entrant Marlain Angelidou.

Artist	Song	Songwriter(s)
Alex Panayi	"There is Love"	Alexandros Panayi
Christina Metaxa	"Firefly"	Nikolas Metaxas
Christiana Theokli, Constantina Georgiou and Andreas Christoforou	"Moving On"	Giorgos Sinos, Christina Georgiou
Gore Melian	"I Wanna Thank You"	Gore Melian
Katerina Neokleous	"I Believe"	Katerina Neokleous
Marian Georgiou	"Heartbeat"	Dionisis Stamatopoulos, Antroulla Michael
Marlain Angelidou and the Diesel Sisters	"Mr. (Do Right) One Night Stand"	Marlain Angelidou
Pieros Kezou	"Bleed 4 U"	Pieros Kezou
Tefkros Neokleous	"Mary"	Tefkros Neokleous
Zel	"I'm Gonna Breakup With You"	Nikos Evagelou, Tefkros Neokleous

==== Final ====
The final took place on 7 February 2009. Ten entries competed and the winner, "Firefly" performed by Christina Metaxa, was selected exclusively by a public televote. In addition to the performances of the competing entries, the show featured a guest performance by 2007 Greek Eurovision entrant Sarbel.

Final – 7 February 2009
R/O	Artist	Song	Televote	Place
1	Tefkros Neokleous	"Mary"	2,161	8
2	Christina Metaxa	"Firefly"	12,309	1
3	Marlain Angelidou and the Diesel Sisters	"Mr. (Do Right) One Night Stand"	2,526	7
4	Marian Georgiou	"Heartbeat"	1,535	10
5	Alex Panayi	"There is Love"	3,305	6
6	Zel	"I'm Gonna Breakup With You"	3,338	5
7	Pieros Kezou	"Bleed 4 U"	6,590	2
8	Christiana Theokli, Constantina Georgiou and Andreas Christoforou	"Moving On"	3,737	4
9	Katerina Neokleous	"I Believe"	1,992	9
10	Gore Melian	"I Wanna Thank You"	3,877	3

=== Promotion ===
Christina Metaxa made several appearances across Europe to specifically promote "Firefly" as the Cypriot Eurovision entry. On 12 March 2009, Metaxa performed "Firefly" during the Greek Eurovision national final Ellinikós Telikós 2009. On 18 April, Metaxa performed during the Eurovision in Concert event which was held at the Amsterdam Marcanti venue in Amsterdam, Netherlands and hosted by Marga Bult and Maggie MacNeal. On 17 April, Metaxa performed during the UK Eurovision Preview Party, which was held in London, United Kingdom and hosted by Nicki French and Paddy O'Connell. Metaxa also took part in promotional activities in Ukraine between 21 and 24 April which included several television and radio appearances.

== At Eurovision ==
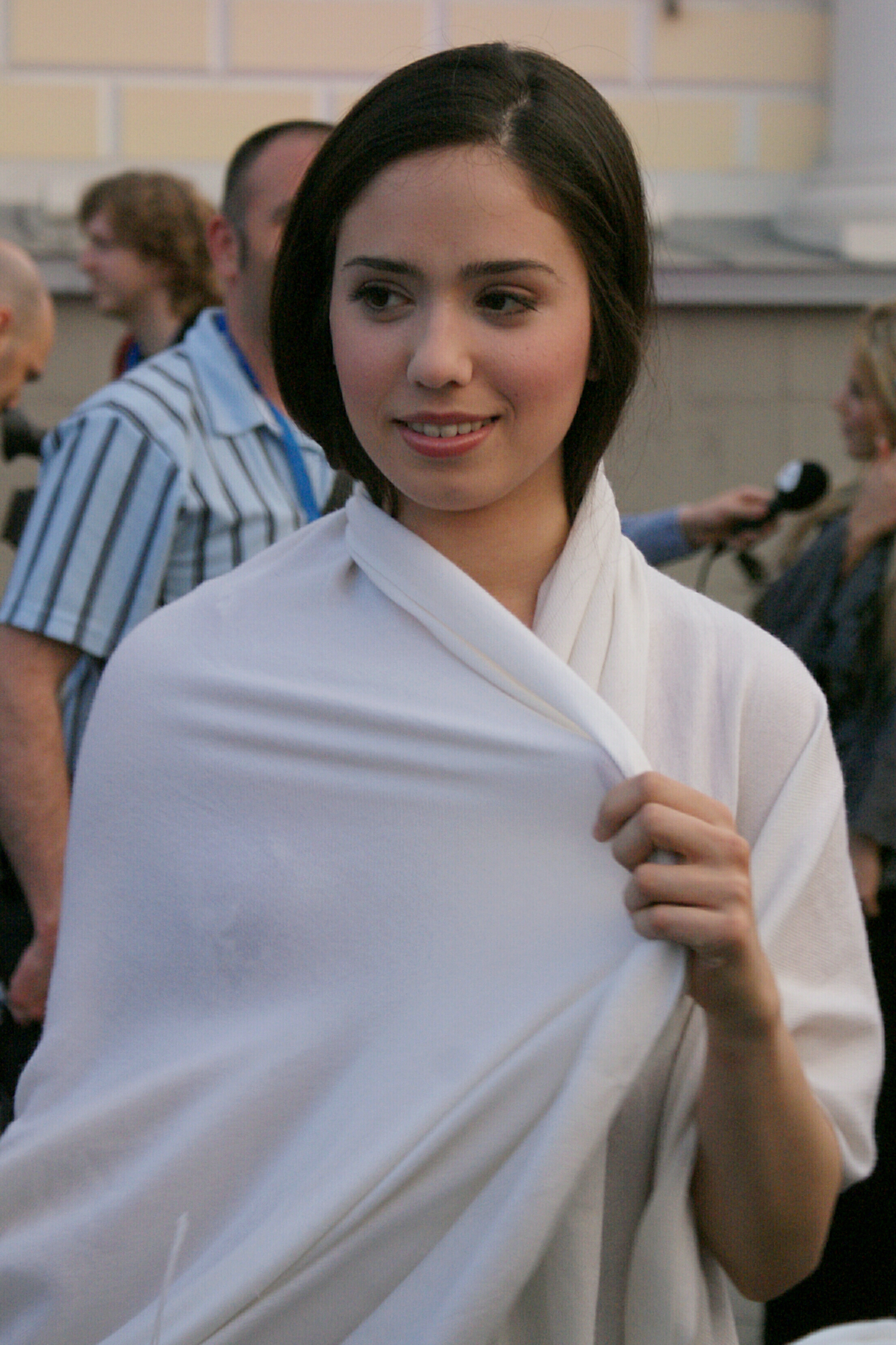
Christina Metaxa at the Eurovision Opening Party in Moscow

According to Eurovision rules, all nations with the exceptions of the host country and the "Big Four" (France, Germany, Spain and the United Kingdom) are required to qualify from one of two semi-finals in order to compete for the final; the top nine songs from each semi-final as determined by televoting progress to the final, and a tenth was determined by back-up juries. The European Broadcasting Union (EBU) split up the competing countries into six different pots based on voting patterns from previous contests, with countries with favourable voting histories put into the same pot. On 30 January 2009, a special allocation draw was held which placed each country into one of the two semi-finals. Cyprus was placed into the second semi-final, to be held on 14 May 2009. The running order for the semi-finals was decided through another draw on 16 March 2009 and Cyprus was set to perform in position 7, following the entry from Norway and before the entry from Slovakia.

The two semi-finals and the final were broadcast in Cyprus on RIK 1, RIK SAT and Trito Programma with commentary by Melina Karageorgiou as well as on Deftero Programma with English commentary by Nathan Morley. The Cypriot spokesperson, who announced the Cypriot votes during the final, was Sophia Paraskeva.

=== Semi-final ===
Metaxa took part in technical rehearsals on 5 and 8 May, followed by dress rehearsals on 13 and 14 May. The Cypriot performance featured Metaxa wearing a white dress and joined by five backing vocalists, two of them in the front of the stage and dressed in white with the remaining three at the back of the stage and dressed in black. The performance featured Metaxa and the two backing vocalists on shining white rotating boxes that were stapled at the end of the song. The stage and LED screens predominantly displayed sea blue colours and a dark forest background with falling leaves and fireflies. The artistic director of the performance was Fotis Nikolaou. The backing vocalists that joined Metaxa were Anna-Karin Eliades, Chris Charalambides, the composer of "Firefly" Nikolas Metaxas, Riana Athanasiou and Richard Hall.

At the end of the show, Cyprus was not announced among the top 10 entries in the second semi-final and therefore failed to qualify to compete in the final. It was later revealed that Cyprus placed 14th in the semi-final, receiving a total of 32 points.

=== Voting ===
Below is a breakdown of points awarded to Cyprus and awarded by Cyprus in the second semi-final and grand final of the contest. The nation awarded its 12 points to Greece in the semi-final and to the final of the contest.

==== Points awarded to Cyprus ====
Points awarded to Cyprus (Semi-final 2)
Score	Country
12 points	Greece
10 points	
8 points	
7 points	Denmark
6 points	Estonia
5 points	
4 points	
3 points	
2 points	Ireland; Serbia
1 point	Latvia; Lithuania; Slovakia

==== Points awarded by Cyprus ====
Points awarded by Cyprus (Semi-final 2)
Score	Country
12 points	Greece
10 points	Azerbaijan
8 points	Norway
7 points	Moldova
6 points	Ukraine
5 points	Estonia
4 points	Serbia
3 points	Denmark
2 points	Croatia
1 point	Lithuania

Points awarded by Cyprus (Final)
Score	Country
12 points	Greece
10 points	Norway
8 points	Azerbaijan
7 points	United Kingdom
6 points	Denmark
5 points	Iceland
4 points	Armenia
3 points	Estonia
2 points	Romania
1 point	Russia

==== Detailed voting results ====
Detailed voting results from Cyprus (Final)
R/O	Country	Results			Points
R/O	Country	Jury	Televoting	Combined	Points
01	Lithuania				
02	Israel				
03	France				
04	Sweden				
05	Croatia				
06	Portugal				
07	Iceland	8		8	5
08	Greece	12	12	24	12
09	Armenia		7	7	4
10	Russia		4	4	1
11	Azerbaijan	4	8	12	8
12	Bosnia and Herzegovina				
13	Moldova		3	3	
14	Malta	3		3	
15	Estonia	6	1	7	3
16	Denmark	10		10	6
17	Germany				
18	Turkey	1	2	3	
19	Albania				
20	Norway	7	10	17	10
21	Ukraine				
22	Romania		5	5	2
23	United Kingdom	5	6	11	7
24	Finland				
25	Spain	2		2	
