= Cyprus in the Eurovision Song Contest 2015 =

- Eurovision Song Contest 2015
- Participating broadcaster: Cyprus Broadcasting Corporation (CyBC)
- Country: Cyprus
- Selection process: Eurovision Song Project
- Selection date: 1 February 2015

Competing entry
- Song: "One Thing I Should Have Done"
- Artist: John Karayiannis
- Songwriters: Mike Connaris; Giannis Karagiannis

Placement
- Semi-final result: Qualified (6th, 87 points)
- Final result: 22nd, 11 points

Participation chronology

Cyprus was represented at the Eurovision Song Contest 2015 with the song "One Thing I Should Have Done", written by Mike Connaris and Giannis Karagiannis, and performed by Karagiannis himself. The Cypriot participating broadcaster, Cyprus Broadcasting Corporation (CyBC), returned to the contest after a one-year absence following its withdrawal in 2014 due to financial and budget restrictions, and organised the national final Eurovision Song Project in order to select its entry for the contest. The national final featured 54 entries competing in a nine-week-long process, resulting in the selection of Karagiannis with "One Thing I Should Have Done" at the final on 1 February 2015, where six entries remained.

Promotional activities for the entry prior to the contest included performances of the song in both Amsterdam and London. Cyprus was drawn to compete in the second semi-final of the Eurovision Song Contest which took place on 21 May 2015. Performing during the show in position 15, "One Thing I Should Have Done" was announced among the top 10 entries of the second semi-final and therefore qualified to compete in the final on 23 May. It was later revealed that Cyprus placed sixth out of the 17 participating countries in the semi-final with 87 points. In the final, Cyprus performed in position 11 and placed twenty-second out of the 27 participating countries, scoring 11 points.

== Background ==
Prior to the 2015 contest, the Cyprus Broadcasting Corporation (CyBC) had participated in the Eurovision Song Contest representing Cyprus thirty-one times since its first entry in 1981. Its best placing was fifth, which it achieved three times: in the 1982 competition with the song "Mono i agapi" performed by Anna Vissi, in the 1997 edition with "Mana mou" performed by Hara and Andreas Constantinou, and the 2004 contest with "Stronger Every Minute" performed by Lisa Andreas. Cyprus' least successful result was in the 1986 contest when it placed last with the song "Tora zo" by Elpida, receiving only four points in total. However, its worst finish in terms of points received was when it placed second to last in the 1999 contest with "Tha'nai erotas" by Marlain Angelidou, receiving only two points. The nation failed to qualify for the final in 2013 with "An me thimasai" performed by Despina Olympiou.

As part of its duties as participating broadcaster, CyBC organises the selection of its entry in the Eurovision Song Contest and broadcasts the event in the country. In October 2013, CyBC announced its withdrawal from the 2014 contest citing public opinion regarding the 2012–2013 Cypriot financial crisis and budget restrictions as factors that influenced this decision. Following rumors since late May 2014 that it would be returning to the contest, CyBC confirmed its intentions to participate at the 2015 contest on 14 July 2014. The broadcaster has used various methods to select its entry in the past, such as internal selections and televised national finals to choose the performer, song or both to compete at Eurovision. CyBC opted to organise a national final based on the Swedish Eurovision selection Melodifestivalen in order to select its 2015 entry with a trailer for the selection being first seen along with their participation confirmation. The national final was originally planned to be a collaboration with music channel MAD TV, however the collaboration was cancelled in October 2014 due to the low amount of submissions received.

== Before Eurovision ==
=== Eurovision Song Project ===
Logo of the Eurovision Song Project

Eurovision Song Project was the national final format developed by CyBC in order to select its entry for the Eurovision Song Contest 2015. The competition involved a nine-week-long process that commenced on 7 December 2014 and concluded with the final on 1 February 2015. The shows took place at the CyBC studios in Nicosia, hosted by Antri Karantoni and were broadcast on RIK 1, RIK Sat as well as online via the broadcaster's website cybc.cy. The final was also streamed online at the official Eurovision Song Contest website eurovision.tv.

==== Format ====
The Eurovision Song Project consisted of 54 entries (Note: 60 entries were selected but six of them did not attend the audition shows.) competing over three phases: the auditions between 7 December 2014 and 11 January 2015, the Eurochallenges on 16 and 23 January 2015, and the final on 1 February 2015. The auditions and Eurochallenges were pre-recorded while the final was broadcast live. Each of the six audition shows included three parts: the Eurobox where each artist talked about their life and connection to the contest along with a short a cappella cover of a past Eurovision entry, the Viewing Room where relatives and friends of each artist watched their performance, and the Eurostudio where each artist performed their candidate Eurovision song in front of a judging panel. Only a one minute preview of the audition performances were shown. During the first Eurochallenge, the 20 artists that progressed from the auditions were required to make a stage performance of their songs in full without backing dancers and 10 entries were eliminated. Each of the remaining 10 artists performed two songs during the second Eurochallenge, one being a piano cover of a past Eurovision entry and one being their candidate Eurovision song. Four acts were eliminated, while the remaining six acts progressed to the final. In the final, the winner was selected from the remaining six entries.

The results of the auditions and Eurochallenges were determined by the judging panel, while the results of the final was determined by the 50/50 combination of votes from the judging panel and televoting. The panel consisted of four permanent members that were joined by varying guest international judges during the Eurochallenges and the final. The permanent judges were:

- Despina Olympiou – Cypriot Eurovision representative in 2013
- Alex Panayi – Cypriot Eurovision representative in 1995 and 2000
- Elena Patroklou – Cypriot Eurovision representative in 1991
- Tasos Tryfonos – Actor and media personality

==== Competing entries ====
Artists and composers were able to submit their entries to the broadcaster between 14 July 2014 and 5 September 2014 through an online submission form. All artists were required to have Cypriot nationality or origin and were able to submit a maximum of two entries, while foreign songwriters were allowed to submit songs as long as they collaborated with at least one songwriter of Cypriot nationality or origin. At the conclusion of the deadline, over 100 entries were received by CyBC and included entries from singer Valanto Trifonos, 1993 and 2002 Cypriot Eurovision entrant Dimos Beke, and 2002 Cypriot Eurovision entrant Philipos Konstantinos. The 60 selected entries were announced on 20 October 2014, and among the competing artists was 2008 Cypriot Junior Eurovision entrant Charis Savva. Mike Connaris composed the Cypriot Eurovision entry in 2004, Nasos Lambrianides co-composed the Cypriot Eurovision entry in 2010, and Zenon Zindilis co-composed the Cypriot Eurovision entry in 2013. Six of the entries were later withdrawn from the competition as their artists did not attend the auditions.

Competing entries
Artist	Song	Songwriter(s)
Adrenaline by Kristis Koupatos	"Live Your Myth"	Mark Angelo, Kristis Koupatos
Anastasia Liberos	"Unicorn"	Georgios Kalpakidis, Linda Persson, Ylva Persson, Michalis Antoniou
Apollonia	"Don't Give Up on Me (Just Yet)"	Apollonia Lysandrou
Charalambos "Luna" Iosif	"Call for Me"	Charalambos "Luna" Iosif
Charalambos "Luna" Iosif	"I Wanna Dance (I Say Tempo)"	Charalambos "Luna" Iosif
~~Christina Matsa~~	~~"I Didn't Know"~~	~~Jean Saliba, Nasser El Assaad, Christian Matsa~~
Christina Papaioannou	"You Can't Stop Love"	Marios Anastasiou, Luke Girvan, Stepohen Ruden
Christina Stylianou	"Lonely Nights"	Lefki Stylianou
Christina Tselepou	"In These Arms"	Andreas Georgallis, Peter Svensson, Erik Anjou
Christodoula Tsaggara	"Kori tis Mesogeiou" (Κόρη της Μεσογείου)	Dimitris Tsaggaras
Christos Rialas	"Meine" (Μείνε)	Nikolas Mavresis, Salina
~~Dimitris Iakovou~~	~~"When I Look at You"~~	~~Michalis Nikolaou, Dimitris Iakovou~~
DJ Perform feat. Stalo Patsia	"My Aura Is Bright"	Marios Christoforou, Stefanos Charalampos
Doody	"Magic"	Constantinos Christoforou, Zenon Zindilis
Elena Kousi	"Just Another Girl"	Marios Liasidis
Eleni Irakleous	"Dawn"	Eleni Irakleous
Eleonora	"Heaven on Earth"	Michalis Rousos, John Vickers
Emily Charalambous	"Right In"	Andreas Anastasiou, Jonas Gladnikoff, Sara Ljunggren, Zinon Zindilis
Eva Diva	"Come and Fight for Freedom"	Henrik Bie, Magnus Josefsson, Eva Kyriakou, Mattias Olsson
Evagoras Evagorou	"Chorevo mambo" (Χορεύω μάμπο)	Panagiotis Damachis, Thessalia Tapakoudi
Flirt	"Let Your Mind Free"	Andreas Le Pourek
Georgiou Konstantina	"When We Used to Be"	Valeria Partsali
Giannis Karagiannis	"One Thing I Should Have Done"	Mike Connaris, Giannis Karagiannis
Gore Melian	"Your Love"	Samuel Bugia Garrido, Athanasios Nakos, Gore Melian
Groove Therapy	"#IsThisRealLife"	Groove Therapy
Helena	"No Money No Honey"	Efrem Macheras, Jani Hölli, Micaella Efrem
Hovig	"Stone in a River"	Argyro Christodoulidou
Ifigenia Loukaidou and Lyrical Eye	"Remember My Love"	Stalo Georgiou, Vasilis Panagi
Ioanna Protopapa	"Beat of My Heart"	John Themis, Ioanna Protopapa, Katerina Themistokleous
Konstantinos Michailoudi	"Stand Up"	Akis Melis, Viky Efstathiou
Kostas Archondous	"Steko akoma" (Στέκω ακόμα)	Kostas Archondous
Kostas Karaiskos	"Rainbow"	Kostas Karaiskos
Kyriakos Georgiou	"Shake Dat"	Mathias Kallenberger, Andreas Berlin, Andreas Anastasiou
Lady Ava	"The Key Is Love"	Lady Ava
Lady Ava	"Until the End of Time"	Martech, Lady Ava
Lucy Sofroniou	"Lonely"	Christian Löwenborg Wahlström, Lucy Sofroniou, Niklas Sawström
Maria Evangelou	"Play Me Like a Pop Song"	Maria Louiza Evangelou, Sara Gunnarsson, Viktor Brunö, Calle Kindbom
Maria Evangelou	"Still"	Layla Kay Lif, Maria Louiza Evangelou
Maria Pavlou	"Tha sou tragoudiso" (Θα σου τραγουδήσω)	Evdokia Chatzicharou, Eleni Artemiou Gavriilidou
Mariana Moskofian and Christiana Hadjiordanous	"Sailing Ships, Pirates and Dragons"	Giorgos Moysi
Minus One	"Shine"	Giorgos Solonos, Amarina Solonos, Francois Micheletto
Miria Pampori	"Find Me"	Minas Pamporis
~~Myrto Makri~~	~~"Alone in Love"~~	~~Lefki Stylianou~~
Nearchos Evangelou and Charis Savva	"Deila den agapo" (Δειλά δεν αγαπώ)	Nearchos Evangelou
Nelena Paparisva	"Run Run Run"	Laurence Hobbs, Alexander Ridge, Stephanie Maarschalk, Nelli Eleni Paparisva
Neofitos Stratis	"Rebound"	Neofitos Stratis
Nikolas Levendis	"Chlomi selini" (Χλωμή σελήνη)	Nikolas Levendis
Nikolas Mavromichalis	"Ena kafe mazi" (Ένα καφέ μαζί)	Petri Kaivanto, Nikolas Mavromichalis
Nikos Trikkis	"Eimai edo" (Είμαι εδώ)	Giorgos Synnos
Olivia Sofokli	"Miracle"	Steven Hosszu, Olivia Sofokli
Panagiotis Koufogiannis	"Without Your Love"	Nasos Lambrianides, Nikoletta Filippou, Mariefi Orfanidou
Pieros Kezou	"Said It All Before"	Pieros Kezou, Staffan Stavert
~~Stefanos Tsiitsios~~	~~"Call on Love"~~	~~Stefanos Tsiitsios~~
~~Stefanos Tsiitsios~~	~~"March to Doubt"~~	~~Stefanos Tsiitsios~~
~~Stella Esmeralda Konstantinou~~	~~"World One"~~	~~Stella Esmeralda Konstantinou~~
Stella Stylianou	"Thelo na chatho" (Θέλω να χαθώ)	Christos Giotis, Lazaros Gketsios, Stella Stylianou
Stella Stylianou	"Thelo na gino ouranos" (Θέλω να γίνω ουρανός)	Stella Stylianou, Andreas Georgallis, Kostas Triggis
The Knockouts	"Real You"	Theodoros Kyriakou, Eleni Savva
Valence	"Scared"	Chrysovalantis Nicolaou
Yuri Melikov	"Victorious"	Clyde Ward, Yuri Melikov

==== Auditions ====
The six audition shows were aired between 7 December 2014 and 11 January 2015 and featured all 54 entries. Twenty entries received at least three "yes" votes from the four permanent judges and progressed to the Eurochallenge.

Audition 1 – 7 December 2014
Artist	R/O	Cover (Original artists)	R/O	ESC Song	Judges				Result
Artist	R/O	Cover (Original artists)	R/O	ESC Song	D. Olympiou	A. Panayi	E. Patroklou	T. Tryfonos	Result
Eva Diva	1	"My Number One" (Helena Paparizou)	2	"Come and Fight for Freedom"	✔	✔	✔	✔	Advanced
Nikolas Levendis	3	"Nocturne" (Secret Garden)	4	"Chlomi selini"	✘	✘	✘	✘	—N/a
Emily Charalambous	5	"Sweet People" (Alyosha)	6	"Right In"	✔	✔	✔	✔	Advanced
Nikolas Mavromichalis	7	"Nel blu, dipinto di blu" (Domenico Modugno)	8	"Ena kafe mazi"	✘	✔	✘	✔	—N/a
Christodoula Tsaggara	9	"An me thimasai" (Despina Olympiou)	10	"Kori tis Mesogeiou"	✘	✘	✔	✘	—N/a
Ifigenia Loukaidou and Lyrical Eye	11	"Euphoria" (Loreen)	12	"Remember My Love"	✔	✔	✘	✘	—N/a
Charalambos "Luna" Iosif	13	"Hold Me Now" (Johnny Logan)	14	"I Wanna Dance (I Say Tempo)"	✔	✘	✔	✔	Advanced
Elena Kousi	15	"Love Shine a Light" (Katrina and the Waves)	16	"Just Another Girl"	✘	✘	✔	✔	—N/a
Maria Evangelou	17	"Where Are You?" (Imaani)	18	"Still"	✔	✔	✔	✘	Advanced

Audition 2 – 14 December 2014
Artist	R/O	Cover (Original artists)	R/O	ESC Song	Judges				Result
Artist	R/O	Cover (Original artists)	R/O	ESC Song	D. Olympiou	A. Panayi	E. Patroklou	T. Tryfonos	Result
Christina Tselepou	1	"Waterloo" (ABBA)	2	"In These Arms"	✔	✔	✔	✔	Advanced
Valence	3	"Only Love Survives" (Ryan Dolan)	4	"Scared"	✔	✔	✔	✔	Advanced
Charalambos "Luna" Iosif	5	"Hold Me Now" (Johnny Logan)	6	"Call for Me"	✘	✘	✘	✘	—N/a
Lady Ava	7	"Go" (Scott Fitzgerald)	8	"Until the End of Time"	✘	✘	✘	✘	—N/a
Pieros Kezou	9	"Power to All Our Friends" (Cliff Richard)	10	"Said It All Before"	✔	✔	✔	✔	Advanced
Kostas Archondous	11	"Hold Me Now" (Johnny Logan)	12	"Steko akoma"	✔	✘	✘	✘	—N/a
Mariana Moskofian and Christiana Hadjiordanous	13	"Is It True?" (Yohanna)	14	"Sailing Ships, Pirates and Dragons"	✔	✔	✔	✔	Advanced
Ioanna Protopapa	15	"Touch My Fire" (Javine)	16	"Beat of My Heart"	✔	✔	✔	✘	Advanced

Audition 3 – 21 December 2014
Artist	R/O	Cover (Original artists)	R/O	ESC Song	Judges				Result
Artist	R/O	Cover (Original artists)	R/O	ESC Song	D. Olympiou	A. Panayi	E. Patroklou	T. Tryfonos	Result
Eleni Irakleous	1	"Ein bißchen Frieden" (Nicole)	2	"Dawn"	✔	✔	✔	✔	Advanced
Eleonora	3	"Only Teardrops" (Emmelie de Forest)	4	"Heaven on Earth"	✔	✘	✔	✘	—N/a
Anastasia Liberos	5	"Stronger Every Minute" (Lisa Andreas)	6	"Unicorn"	✔	✘	✘	✔	—N/a
Doody	7	"Euphoria" (Loreen)	8	"Magic"	✔	✔	✔	✔	Advanced
Evagoras Evagorou	9	"Fairytale" (Alexander Rybak)	10	"Chorevo mambo"	✘	✔	✘	✔	—N/a
Nearchos Evangelou and Charis Savva	11	"In a Moment like This" (Chanée and N'evergreen)	12	"Deila den agapo"	✔	✔	✔	✔	Advanced
Christina Papaioannou	13	"Is It True?" (Yohanna)	14	"You Can't Stop Love"	✘	✘	✘	✘	—N/a
Lady Ava	15	"Same Heart" (Mei Finegold)	16	"The Key Is Love"	✘	✘	✘	✘	—N/a
DJ Perform feat. Stalo Patsia	17	"I anixi" (Sophia Vossou)	18	"My Aura Is Bright"	✘	✘	✘	✘	—N/a
Christos Rialas	19	"Watch My Dance" (Loukas Yorkas feat. Stereo Mike)	20	"Meine"	✔	✔	✔	✔	Advanced

Audition 4 – 28 December 2014
Artist	R/O	Cover (Original artists)	R/O	ESC Song	Judges				Result
Artist	R/O	Cover (Original artists)	R/O	ESC Song	D. Olympiou	A. Panayi	E. Patroklou	T. Tryfonos	Result
Lucy Sofroniou	1	"Stronger Every Minute" (Lisa Andreas)	2	"Lonely"	✘	✔	✘	✔	—N/a
Groove Therapy	3	"Satellite" (Lena)	4	"#IsThisRealLife"	✘	✔	✔	✘	—N/a
Nikos Trikkis	5	"Genesis" (Michalis Hatzigiannis)	6	"Eimai edo"	✘	✘	✔	✘	—N/a
Minus One	7	"Poupée de cire, poupée de son" (France Gall)	8	"Shine"	✔	✔	✔	✔	Advanced
Kostas Karaiskos	9	"My Number One" (Helena Paparizou)	10	"Rainbow"	✘	✘	✘	✘	—N/a
Nelena Paparisva	11	"Euphoria" (Loreen)	12	"Run Run Run"	✘	✔	✔	✘	—N/a
Konstantinos Michailoudi	13	"I anixi" (Sophia Vossou)	14	"Stand Up"	✘	✘	✘	✘	—N/a
Giannis Karagiannis	15	"Stronger Every Minute" (Lisa Andreas)	16	"One Thing I Should Have Done"	✔	✔	✔	✔	Advanced
The Knockouts	17	"Hold Me Now" (Johnny Logan)	18	"Real You"	✔	✘	✘	✔	—N/a
Stella Stylianou	19	"Mono yia mas" (Constantinos Christoforou)	20	"Thelo na gino ouranos"	✘	✘	✔	✘	—N/a

Audition 5 – 4 January 2015
Artist	R/O	Cover (Original artists)	R/O	ESC Song	Judges				Result
Artist	R/O	Cover (Original artists)	R/O	ESC Song	D. Olympiou	A. Panayi	E. Patroklou	T. Tryfonos	Result
Yuri Melikov	1	"Hold Me Now" (Johnny Logan)	2	"Victorious"	✔	✔	✔	✔	Advanced
Christina Stylianou	3	"Stronger Every Minute" (Lisa Andreas)	4	"Lonely Nights"	✘	✔	✘	✘	—N/a
Apollonia	5	"Only Teardrops" (Emmelie de Forest)	6	"Don't Give Up on Me (Just Yet)"	✔	✘	✔	✔	Advanced
Neofitos Stratis	7	"Non ho l'età" (Gigliola Cinquetti)	8	"Rebound"	✔	✘	✔	✘	—N/a
Flirt	9	"Euphoria" (Loreen)	10	"Let Your Mind Free"	✘	✘	✘	✘	—N/a
Helena	11	"Euphoria" (Loreen)	12	"No Money No Honey"	✘	✘	✘	✘	—N/a
Georgiou Konstantina	13	"Is It True?" (Yohanna)	14	"When We Used to Be"	✔	✘	✔	✘	—N/a
Hovig	15	"I anixi" (Sophia Vossou)	16	"Stone in a River"	✔	✔	✔	✔	Advanced
Maria Evangelou	17	"Cliche Love Song" (Basim)	18	"Play Me Like a Pop Song"	✔	✘	✘	✘	—N/a

Audition 6 – 11 January 2015
Artist	R/O	Cover (Original artists)	R/O	ESC Song	Judges				Result
Artist	R/O	Cover (Original artists)	R/O	ESC Song	D. Olympiou	A. Panayi	E. Patroklou	T. Tryfonos	Result
Maria Pavlou	1	"Believe" (Dima Bilan)	2	"Tha sou tragoudiso"	✔	✘	✔	✘	—N/a
Olivia Sofokli	3	"Euphoria" (Loreen)	4	"Miracle"	✘	✘	✘	✘	—N/a
Gore Melian	5	"Without Your Love" (André)	6	"Your Love"	✔	✘	✘	✘	—N/a
Panagiotis Koufogiannis	7	"Fairytale" (Alexander Rybak)	8	"Without Your Love"	✔	✔	✔	✔	Advanced
Adrenaline by Kristis Koupatos	9	"Satellite" (Lena)	10	"Live Your Myth"	✘	✘	✘	✘	—N/a
Miria Pampori	11	"Cool Vibes" (Vanilla Ninja)	12	"Find Me"	✘	✔	✔	✘	—N/a
Stella Stylianou	13	"Olou tou kosmou i elpida" (Cleopatra)	14	"Thelo na chatho"	✘	✔	✔	✘	—N/a
Kyriakos Georgiou	15	"Nel blu, dipinto di blu" (Domenico Modugno)	16	"Shake Dat"	✔	✘	✔	✔	Advanced

==== Eurochallenges ====
The two Eurochallenges shows aired on 16 and 23 January 2015. Each of the twenty remaining artists performed their candidate Eurovision song in the first show and the judging panel selected 10 to progress to the second show. Each of the ten remaining artists performed a piano cover of a past Eurovision entry and their candidate Eurovision song in the second show and the judging panel selected six to progress to the final. The two guest international judges for the Eurochallenges were Christer Björkman (Head of Delegation for Sweden at Eurovision and supervisor of Melodifestivalen) and Dimitris Kontopoulos (Greek producer).

Eurochallenge 1 – 16 January 2015
R/O	Artist	Song	Result
1	Emily Charalambous	"Right In"	—N/a
2	Doody	"Magic"	Advanced
3	Nearchos Evangelou and Charis Savva	"Deila den agapo"	Advanced
4	Christos Rialas	"Meine"	Advanced
5	Mariana Moskofian and Christiana Hadjiordanous	"Sailing Ships, Pirates and Dragons"	—N/a
6	Minus One	"Shine"	Advanced
7	Giannis Karagiannis	"One Thing I Should Have Done"	Advanced
8	Apollonia	"Don't Give Up on Me (Just Yet)"	—N/a
9	Maria Evangelou	"Still"	—N/a
10	Eleni Irakleous	"Dawn"	—N/a
11	Yuri Melikov	"Victorious"	—N/a
12	Hovig	"Stone in a River"	Advanced
13	Panagiotis Koufogiannis	"Without Your Love"	Advanced
14	Valence	"Scared"	—N/a
15	Kyriakos Georgiou	"Shake Dat"	—N/a
16	Charalambos "Luna" Iosif	"I Wanna Dance (I Say Tempo)"	—N/a
17	Christina Tselepou	"In These Arms"	Advanced
18	Ioanna Protopapa	"Beat of My Heart"	Advanced
19	Eva Diva	"Come and Fight for Freedom"	—N/a
20	Pieros Kezou	"Said It All Before"	Advanced

Eurochallenge 2 – 23 January 2015
Artist	R/O	Cover (Original artists)	R/O	ESC Song	Result
Christina Tselepou	1	"Teriazoume" (Evridiki)	2	"In These Arms"	—N/a
Nearchos Evangelou and Charis Savva	3	"Is It True?" (Yohanna)	4	"Deila den agapo"	Advanced
Ioanna Protopapa	5	"Undo" (Sanna Nielsen)	6	"Beat of My Heart"	—N/a
Giannis Karagiannis	7	"Diggi-Loo Diggi-Ley" (Herreys)	8	"One Thing I Should Have Done"	Advanced
Christos Rialas	9	"Molitva" (Marija Šerifović)	10	"Meine"	—N/a
Hovig	11	"Hold Me Now" (Johnny Logan)	12	"Stone in a River"	Advanced
Minus One	13	"Euphoria" (Loreen)	14	"Shine"	Advanced
Doody	15	"Euphoria" (Loreen)	16	"Magic"	Advanced
Panagiotis Koufogiannis	17	"Molitva" (Marija Šerifović)	18	"Without Your Love"	Advanced
Pieros Kezou	19	"Si la vie est cadeau" (Corinne Hermès)	20	"Said It All Before"	—N/a

==== Final ====
The final took place on 1 February 2015. The six remaining entries competed and the winner, "One Thing I Should Have Done" performed by Giannis Karagiannis, was selected by a 50/50 combination of votes from the judging panel and a public televote. The two guest international judges for the final were Bruno Berberes (French television director) and Nicola Caligiore (Head of Delegation for Italy at Eurovision). In addition to the performances of the competing entries, the four permanent judges of the competition each performed with two of the finalists. Alex Panayi performed with Doody and Giannis Karagiannis, Elena Patroklou performed with Hovig and Panagiotis Koufogiannis, and Despina Olympiou performed with Nearchos Evangelou and Charis Savva.

Final – 1 February 2015
R/O	Artist	Song	Jury	Televote		Total	Place
R/O	Artist	Song	Jury	Votes	Points	Total	Place
1	Hovig	"Stone in a River"	8	18,388	8	16	4
2	Doody	"Magic"	7	13,516	6	13	5
3	Panagiotis Koufogiannis	"Without Your Love"	6	24,638	12	18	2
4	Minus One	"Shine"	12	6,353	5	17	3
5	Giannis Karagiannis	"One Thing I Should Have Done"	10	22,858	10	20	1
6	Nearchos Evangelou and Charis Savva	"Deila den agapo"	5	13,891	7	12	6

=== Promotion ===
John Karayiannis made several appearances across Europe to specifically promote "One Thing I Should Have Done" as the Cypriot Eurovision entry. On 18 April, Karayiannis performed during the Eurovision in Concert event which was held at the Melkweg venue in Amsterdam, Netherlands and hosted by Cornald Maas and Edsilia Rombley. On 26 April, Karayiannis performed during the London Eurovision Party, which was held at the Café de Paris venue in London, United Kingdom and hosted by Nicki French and Paddy O'Connell.

== At Eurovision ==
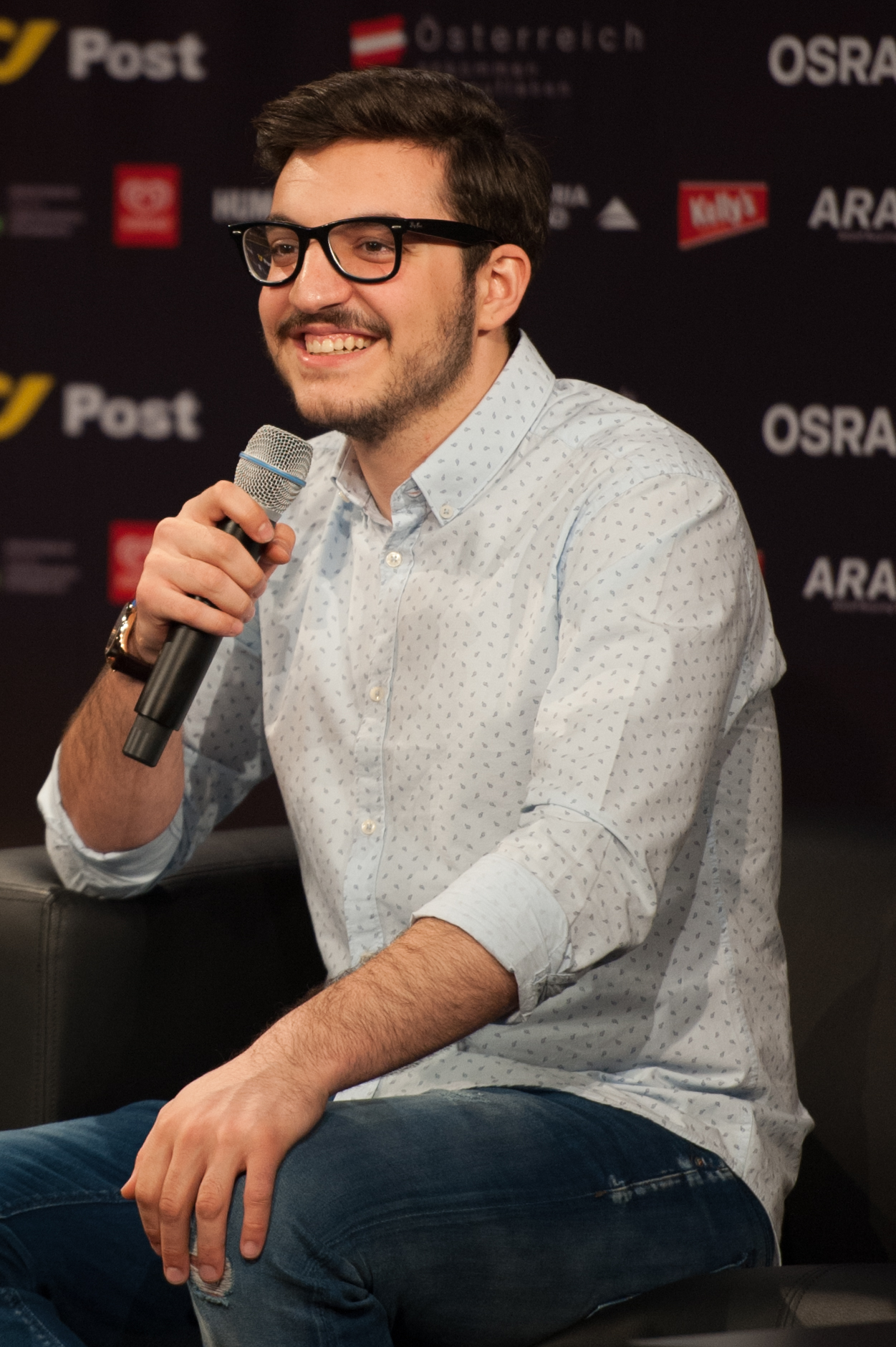
Karayiannis at a press meet and greet.

The Eurovision Song Contest 2015 took place at Wiener Stadthalle in Vienna, Austria. It consisted of two semi-finals held on 19 and 21 May, respectively, and the final on 23 May 2015. According to Eurovision rules, all nations with the exceptions of the host country and the "Big Five", consisting of France, Germany, Italy, Spain and the United Kingdom, were required to qualify from one of two semi-finals in order to compete for the final; the top 10 countries from each semi-final progress to the final. In the 2015 contest, Australia also competed directly in the final as an invited guest nation. The European Broadcasting Union (EBU) split up the competing countries into five different pots based on voting patterns from previous 10 years. On 26 January 2015, an allocation draw was held which placed each country into one of the two semi-finals, as well as which half of the show they would perform in. Cyprus was placed into the second semi-final, to be held on 21 May 2015, and was scheduled to perform in the second half of the show.

Once all the competing songs for the 2015 contest had been released, the running order for the semi-finals was decided by the shows' producers rather than through another draw, so that similar songs were not placed next to each other. Cyprus was set to perform in position 15, following the entry from Switzerland and before the entry from Slovenia. All three shows were broadcast in Cyprus on RIK 1, RIK SAT, RIK HD and Trito Programma with commentary by Melina Karageorgiou. Loukas Hamatsos was the Cypriot spokesperson who announced the nation's votes during the final.

=== Semi-final ===
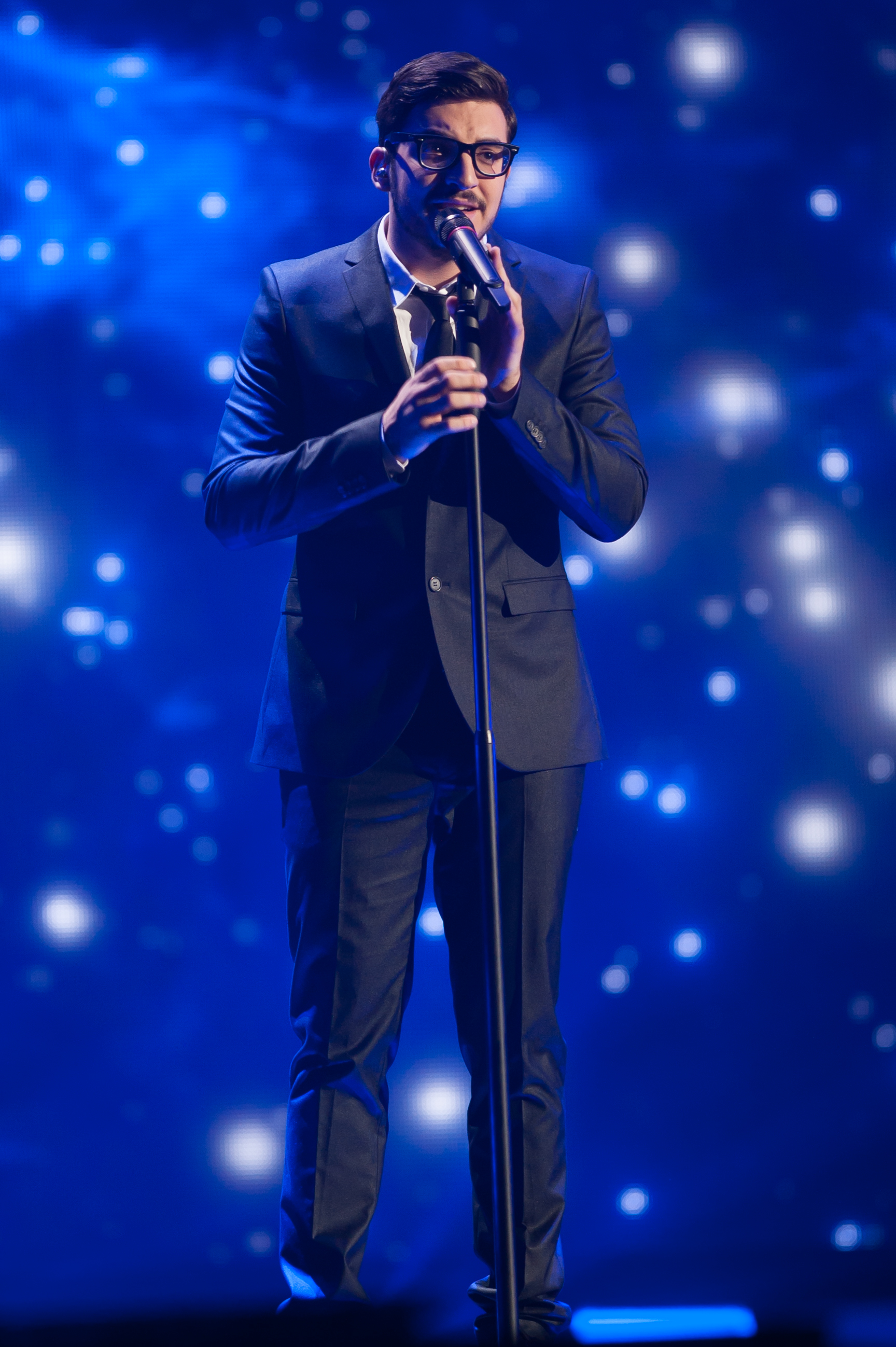
Karayiannis at a dress rehearsal for the second semi-final

John Karayiannis took part in technical rehearsals on 14 and 16 May, followed by dress rehearsals on 20 and 21 May 2015. This included the jury final where professional juries of each country, responsible for 50 percent of each country's vote, watched and voted on the competing entries.

At the start of the song, the arena was plunged into darkness and Karayiannis had a single spotlight shining down from above on him. The initial shots were all in black and white. Karayiannis was dressed very smartly in a black suit and black tie, with him wearing his trademark glasses. Gradually the light increased and the LED screens showed a star-like background, with the lighting having various hues of blue, purple and orange. Around two minutes into the song, the background exploded into flame-like bursts of light on key moments in the lyrics, especially on the 'I should' line.

At the end of the show, Cyprus was announced as having finished in the top 10 and subsequently qualifying for the final. It was later revealed that Cyprus placed sixth in the semi-final, receiving a total of 87 points.

=== Final ===
Shortly after the second semi-final, a winner's press conference was held for the 10 qualifying countries. As part of this press conference, the qualifying artists took part in a draw to determine which half of the final they would subsequently participate in. This draw was done in the order the countries were announced during the semi-final; Cyprus was drawn to compete in the first half. Following this draw, the shows' producers decided upon the running order of the final, as they had done for the semi-finals. Cyprus was subsequently placed to perform in position 11, following the entry from Sweden and before the entry from Australia.

Karayiannis once again took part in dress rehearsals on 22 and 23 May 2015 before the final, including the jury final where the professional juries cast their final votes before the live show. Karayiannis performed a repeat of his semi-final performance during the final on 23 May. At the conclusion of the voting, Cyprus placed 22nd with 11 points.

=== Voting ===
Voting during the three shows consisted of 50 percent public televoting and 50 percent from a jury deliberation. The jury consisted of five music industry professionals who were citizens of the country they represent, with their names published before the contest to ensure transparency. This jury was asked to judge each contestant based on: vocal capacity; the stage performance; the song's composition and originality; and the overall impression by the act. In addition, no member of a national jury could be related in any way to any of the competing acts in such a way that they cannot vote impartially and independently. The individual rankings of each jury member were released shortly after the final.

Following the release of the full split voting by the EBU after the conclusion of the competition, it was revealed that Cyprus had placed twenty-third with the public televote and ninth with the jury vote in the final. In the public vote, the country scored 8 points, finishing in 23rd place, while in the jury vote, Cyprus placed ninth with 63 points. In the second semi-final, Cyprus placed eighth with the public televote, receiving 80 points and eighth with the jury vote with 76 points.

Below is a breakdown of points awarded to Cyprus and awarded by the country in the second semi-final and final of the contest, and the breakdown of the jury voting and televoting conducted during the two shows:

==== Points awarded to Cyprus ====
Points awarded to Cyprus (Semi-final 2)
Score	Country
12 points	
10 points	
8 points	
7 points	Italy; Slovenia
6 points	Australia; Ireland; Latvia; Norway; Portugal; Sweden; United Kingdom
5 points	Germany; Iceland; Israel; Switzerland
4 points	Poland
3 points	Lithuania
2 points	Malta; San Marino
1 point	

Points awarded to Cyprus (Final)
Score	Country
12 points	
10 points	Greece
8 points	
7 points	
6 points	
5 points	
4 points	
3 points	
2 points	
1 point	Slovenia

==== Points awarded by Cyprus ====
Points awarded by Cyprus (Semi-final 2)
Score	Country
12 points	Sweden
10 points	Israel
8 points	Latvia
7 points	Lithuania
6 points	Norway
5 points	Azerbaijan
4 points	Poland
3 points	Slovenia
2 points	Montenegro
1 point	Ireland

Points awarded by Cyprus (Final)
Score	Country
12 points	Italy
10 points	Sweden
8 points	Greece
7 points	Belgium
6 points	Israel
5 points	Russia
4 points	Australia
3 points	Latvia
2 points	Estonia
1 point	Romania

==== Detailed voting results ====
The Cypriot votes in the second semi-final and the final were based on 50% jury voting and 50% televoting results. The following members comprised the Cypriot jury:

- Andreas Giortsios (jury chairperson) – radio producer, news anchorman
- Elias Antoniades – lyricist, general manager
- Gore Melian – singer
- Stella Stylianou – singer, teacher
- Argyro Christodoulidou – composer, lyricist

Detailed voting results from Cyprus (Semi-final 2)
R/O	Country	A. Giortsios	E. Antoniades	G. Melian	S. Stylianou	A. Christodoulidou	Jury Rank	Televote Rank	Combined Rank	Points
01	Lithuania	11	8	6	7	6	6	4	4	7
02	Ireland	7	6	7	5	4	5	13	10	1
03	San Marino	14	16	16	16	16	16	12	14	
04	Montenegro	6	7	10	6	14	9	9	9	2
05	Malta	9	13	5	12	8	10	10	11	
06	Norway	2	2	3	3	3	3	8	5	6
07	Portugal	16	15	14	9	13	14	16	16	
08	Czech Republic	12	12	9	14	12	13	11	12	
09	Israel	5	3	4	4	5	4	1	2	10
10	Latvia	1	5	2	1	2	2	5	3	8
11	Azerbaijan	4	4	12	11	10	7	6	6	5
12	Iceland	13	10	15	10	11	12	14	13	
13	Sweden	3	1	1	2	1	1	2	1	12
14	Switzerland	15	14	13	13	15	15	15	15	
15	Cyprus									
16	Slovenia	10	9	8	8	7	8	7	8	3
17	Poland	8	11	11	15	9	11	3	7	4

Detailed voting results from Cyprus (Final)
R/O	Country	A. Giortsios	E. Antoniades	G. Melian	S. Stylianou	A. Christodoulidou	Jury Rank	Televote Rank	Combined Rank	Points
01	Slovenia	18	16	18	19	10	17	19	18	
02	France	2	6	23	8	21	9	23	17	
03	Israel	15	8	6	9	7	7	6	5	6
04	Estonia	4	9	22	17	13	10	9	9	2
05	United Kingdom	23	21	9	26	11	22	18	22	
06	Armenia	9	24	13	20	22	21	5	12	
07	Lithuania	22	20	10	14	8	15	17	16	
08	Serbia	6	13	15	18	14	11	15	13	
09	Norway	3	5	3	4	5	2	20	11	
10	Sweden	5	7	1	3	2	1	4	2	10
11	Cyprus									
12	Australia	10	14	5	15	3	8	10	7	4
13	Belgium	11	2	4	6	4	5	7	4	7
14	Austria	17	17	14	16	9	14	26	23	
15	Greece	8	3	12	1	15	6	1	3	8
16	Montenegro	21	12	19	10	17	16	21	19	
17	Germany	20	22	20	23	20	24	24	26	
18	Poland	16	23	25	24	16	23	16	21	
19	Latvia	7	11	2	2	1	4	14	8	3
20	Romania	25	4	16	11	12	12	8	10	1
21	Spain	12	19	17	12	24	19	11	14	
22	Hungary	14	25	8	22	18	20	25	24	
23	Georgia	26	26	24	21	25	26	13	20	
24	Azerbaijan	19	10	21	13	19	18	12	15	
25	Russia	13	15	11	7	23	13	3	6	5
26	Albania	24	18	26	25	26	25	22	25	
27	Italy	1	1	7	5	6	3	2	1	12
