= Cyprus in the Eurovision Song Contest 2013 =

- Eurovision Song Contest 2013
- Participating broadcaster: Cyprus Broadcasting Corporation (CyBC)
- Country: Cyprus
- Selection process: Internal selection
- Announcement date: Artist: 1 February 2013; Song: 14 February 2013

Competing entry
- Song: "An me thimasai"
- Artist: Despina Olympiou
- Songwriters: Andreas Giorgallis; Zenon Zindilis

Placement
- Semi-final result: Failed to qualify (15th)

Participation chronology

Cyprus was represented at the Eurovision Song Contest 2013 with the song "An me thimasai" written by Andreas Giorgallis and Zenon Zindilis. The song was performed by Despina Olympiou, who was selected by the Cypriot broadcaster Cyprus Broadcasting Corporation (CyBC) in February 2013 to represent Cyprus at the 2013 contest in Malmö, Sweden. The Cypriot song, "An me thimasai", was presented to the public on 14 February 2013.

Cyprus was drawn to compete in the first semi-final of the Eurovision Song Contest which took place on 14 May 2013. Performing during the show in position 14, "An me thimasai" was not announced among the top 10 entries of the first semi-final and therefore did not qualify to compete in the final. It was later revealed that Cyprus placed fifteenth out of the 16 participating countries in the semi-final with 11 points.

== Background ==
Prior to the 2013 contest, Cyprus had participated in the Eurovision Song Contest thirty times since their debut in the 1981 contest. Its best placing was fifth, which it achieved three times: in the 1982 competition with the song "Mono i agapi" performed by Anna Vissi, in the 1997 edition with "Mana mou" performed by Hara and Andreas Constantinou, and the 2004 contest with "Stronger Every Minute" performed by Lisa Andreas. Cyprus' least successful result was in the 1986 contest when it placed last with the song "Tora zo" by Elpida, receiving only four points in total. However, its worst finish in terms of points received was when it placed second to last in the 1999 contest with "Tha'nai erotas" by Marlain Angelidou, receiving only two points. The nation managed to qualify to the final in 2012 and place sixteenth with the song "La La Love" performed by Ivi Adamou.

The Cypriot national broadcaster, Cyprus Broadcasting Corporation (CyBC), broadcasts the event within Cyprus and organises the selection process for the nation's entry. Despite considerations for a withdrawal due to the 2012–13 Cypriot financial crisis, CyBC confirmed their intentions to participate at the 2013 Eurovision Song Contest on 5 December 2012. Cyprus has used various methods to select the Cypriot entry in the past, such as internal selections and televised national finals to choose the performer, song or both to compete at Eurovision. In 2012, the broadcaster internally selected the artist and organised a national final to select the song. CyBC opted to select both the artist and song for the 2013 contest via an internal selection, a method which was last used by the broadcaster in 2007.

== Before Eurovision ==
=== Internal selection ===
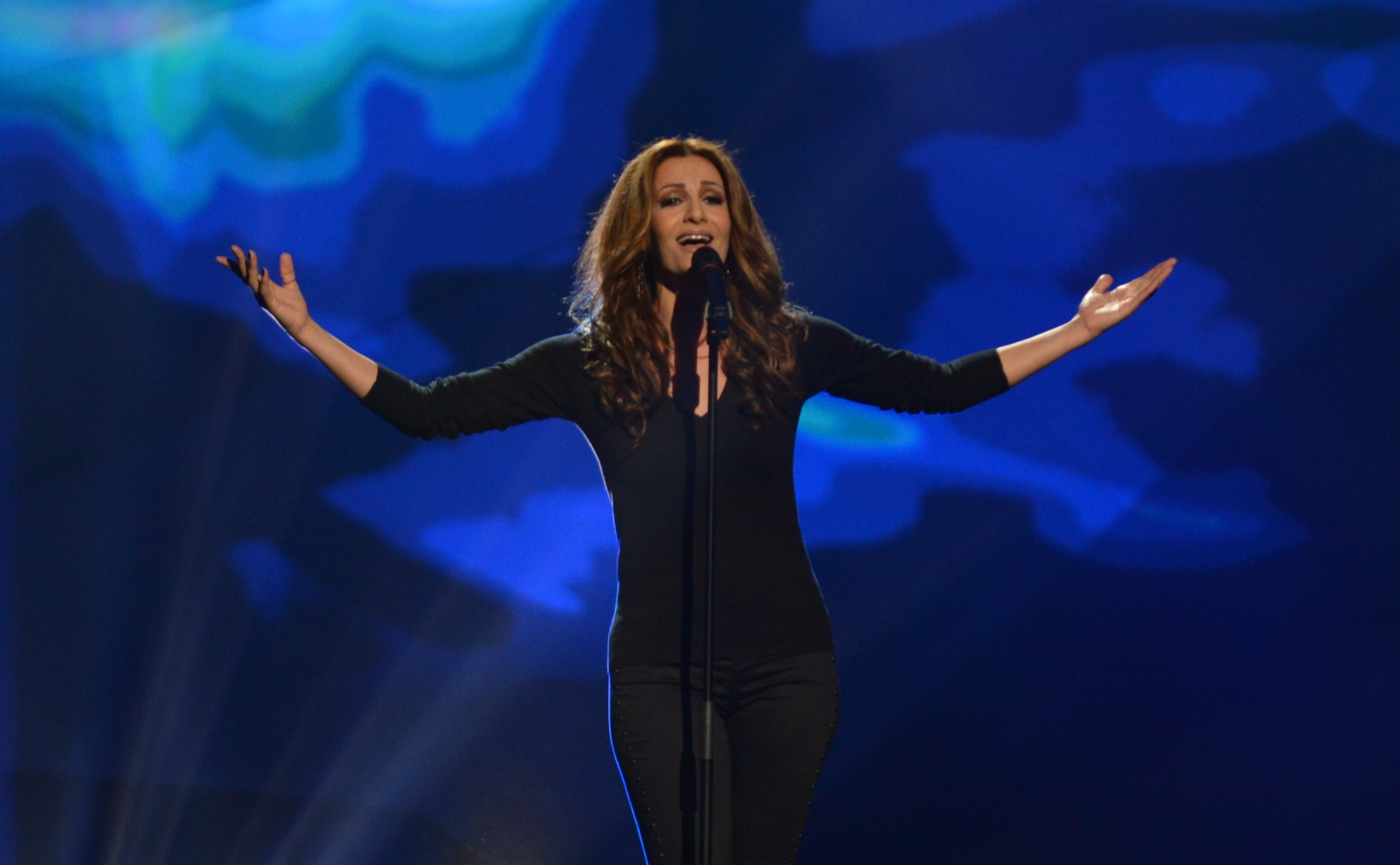
Despina Olympiou was internally selected to represent Cyprus in the Eurovision Song Contest 2013

In January 2013, it was reported by Cypriot media that CyBC had shortlisted six artists to become the Cypriot artist for the Eurovision Song Contest 2013: Despina Olympiou, Giorgos Doukas, Giorgos Papadopoulos, 2002 Cypriot Eurovision entrant Philipos Konstantinos, Valanto Trifonos and Vera Boufi. Papadopoulos was first approached by CyBC but declined the offer, while Trifonos later withdrew her candidate entry which was written by 1998 Cypriot Eurovision entrant Michalis Hatzigiannis at the request of her record label. On 1 February 2013, CyBC announced that they had internally selected Despina Olympiou to represent Cyprus in Malmö with her contest song being written by Andreas Giorgallis and Zenon Zindilis.

The song, "An me thimasai", was presented to the public on 14 February 2013 during a press conference that was broadcast on RIK 1 and RIK Sat as well as online via the broadcaster's website cybc.cy. The official preview video for the song was filmed in early March 2013 and released by cytamobile on 12 March 2013 and later via the official Eurovision Song Contest's YouTube channel on 15 March 2013.

=== Preparation ===
Despina Olympiou specifically promoted "An me thimasai" as the Cypriot Eurovision entry on 18 February 2013 by performing the song during the Greek Eurovision national final Eurosong 2013 – a MAD show. Acoustic versions of "An me thimasai" in Spanish and English titled "Si me recuerdas" and "If You Think of Me", respectively were also recorded and released in early March.

== At Eurovision ==
According to Eurovision rules, all nations with the exceptions of the host country and the "Big Five" (France, Germany, Italy, Spain and the United Kingdom) are required to qualify from one of two semi-finals in order to compete for the final; the top ten countries from each semi-final progress to the final. The European Broadcasting Union (EBU) split up the competing countries into six different pots based on voting patterns from previous contests, with countries with favourable voting histories put into the same pot. On 17 January 2013, a special allocation draw was held which placed each country into one of the two semi-finals, as well as which half of the show they would perform in. Cyprus was placed into the first semi-final, to be held on 14 May 2013, and was scheduled to perform in the second half of the show.

Once all the competing songs for the 2013 contest had been released, the running order for the semi-finals was decided by the shows' producers rather than through another draw, so that similar songs were not placed next to each other. Cyprus was set to perform in position 14, following the entry from Ireland and before the entry from Belgium.

The two semi-finals and the final were broadcast in Cyprus on RIK 1, RIK SAT, RIK HD and RIK Triton with commentary by Melina Karageorgiou. The Cypriot spokesperson, who announced the Cypriot votes during the final, was Loukas Hamatsos.

=== Semi-final ===
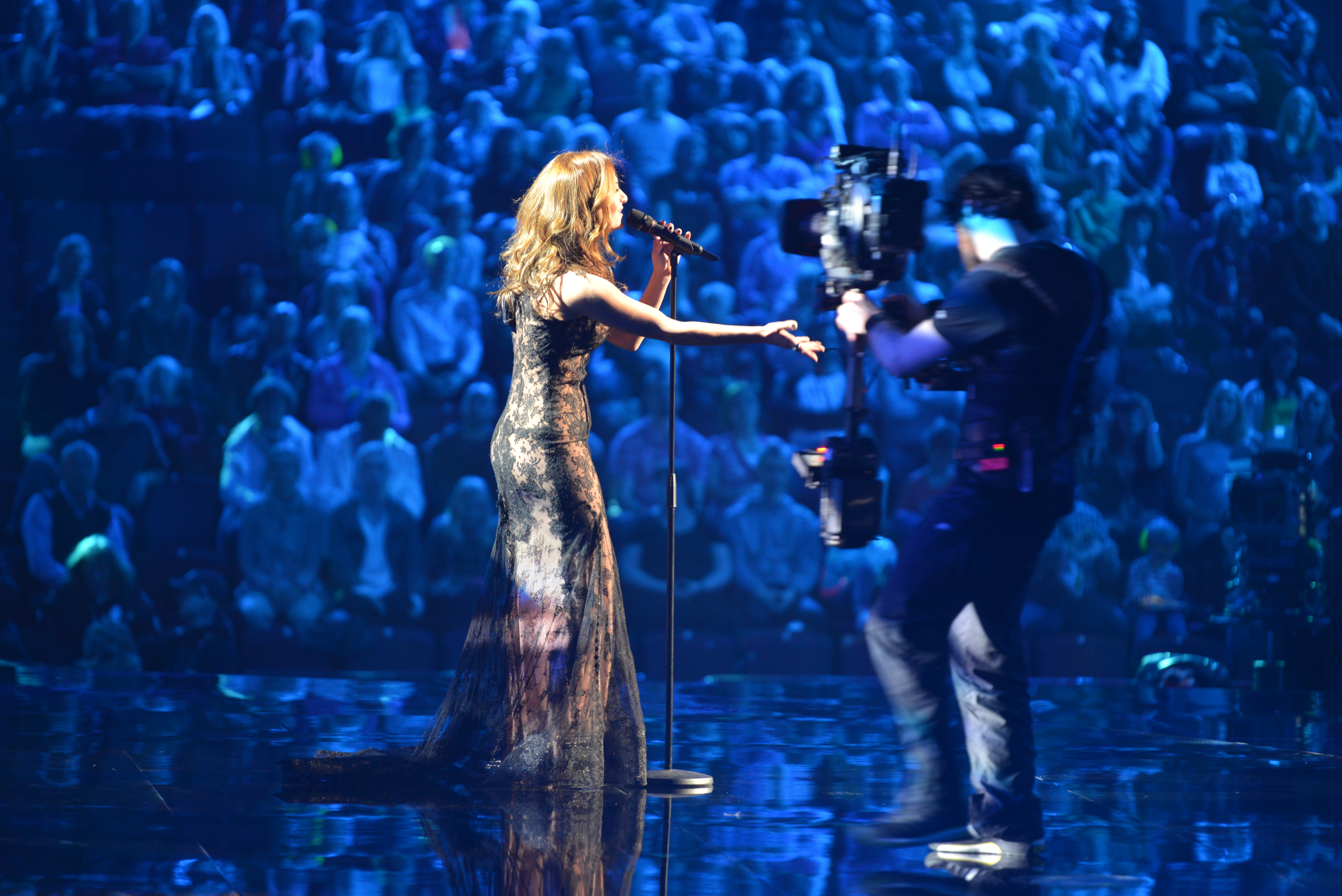
Despina Olympiou during a rehearsal before the first semi-final

Despina Olympiou took part in technical rehearsals on 7 and 10 May, followed by dress rehearsals on 13 and 14 May. This included the jury show on 13 May where the professional juries of each country watched and voted on the competing entries. The Cypriot performance featured Despina Olympiou wearing a black silk dress with tulle elements and performing alone in the centre of the stage with a microphone stand. The LED screens displayed blue shades with wind machines and a split screen effect being used for the performance.

At the end of the show, Cyprus was not announced among the top 10 entries in the first semi-final and therefore failed to qualify to compete in the final. It was later revealed that Cyprus placed fifteenth in the semi-final, receiving a total of 11 points.

=== Voting ===
Voting during the three shows consisted of 50 percent public televoting and 50 percent from a jury deliberation. The jury consisted of five music industry professionals who were citizens of the country they represent. This jury was asked to judge each contestant based on: vocal capacity; the stage performance; the song's composition and originality; and the overall impression by the act. In addition, no member of a national jury could be related in any way to any of the competing acts in such a way that they cannot vote impartially and independently.

Following the release of the full split voting by the EBU after the conclusion of the competition, it was revealed that Cyprus had placed fourteenth with the public televote and twelfth with the jury vote in the first semi-final. In the public vote, Cyprus received an average rank of 12.00, while with the jury vote, Cyprus received an average rank of 9.47.

Below is a breakdown of points awarded to Cyprus and awarded by Cyprus in the first semi-final and grand final of the contest. The nation awarded its 12 points to Ukraine in the semi-final and to Greece in the final of the contest.

==== Points awarded to Cyprus ====
Points awarded to Cyprus (Semi-final 1)
| Score | Country |
|---|---|
| 12 points | |
| 10 points | |
| 8 points | |
| 7 points | |
| 6 points | |
| 5 points | |
| 4 points | |
| 3 points | Serbia; United Kingdom |
| 2 points | Belgium; Estonia |
| 1 point | Austria |

==== Points awarded by Cyprus ====
Points awarded by Cyprus (Semi-final 1)
| Score | Country |
|---|---|
| 12 points | Ukraine |
| 10 points | Russia |
| 8 points | Denmark |
| 7 points | Ireland |
| 6 points | Belarus |
| 5 points | Moldova |
| 4 points | Serbia |
| 3 points | Lithuania |
| 2 points | Austria |
| 1 point | Croatia |

Points awarded by Cyprus (Final)
| Score | Country |
|---|---|
| 12 points | Greece |
| 10 points | Ukraine |
| 8 points | Azerbaijan |
| 7 points | Denmark |
| 6 points | Italy |
| 5 points | Russia |
| 4 points | Norway |
| 3 points | Malta |
| 2 points | Ireland |
| 1 point | France |
