= Hellenic Television =

Hellenic Television may refer to:

- Hellenic Broadcasting Corporation, Greek state broadcaster
- New Hellenic Television, second television network of the Hellenic Broadcasting Corporation
- Hellenic TV, a Greek-language television station based in the United Kingdom
