= Despina Olympiou =

Greek Cypriot singer (born 1975)

Despina Olympiou Δέσποινα Ολυμπίου
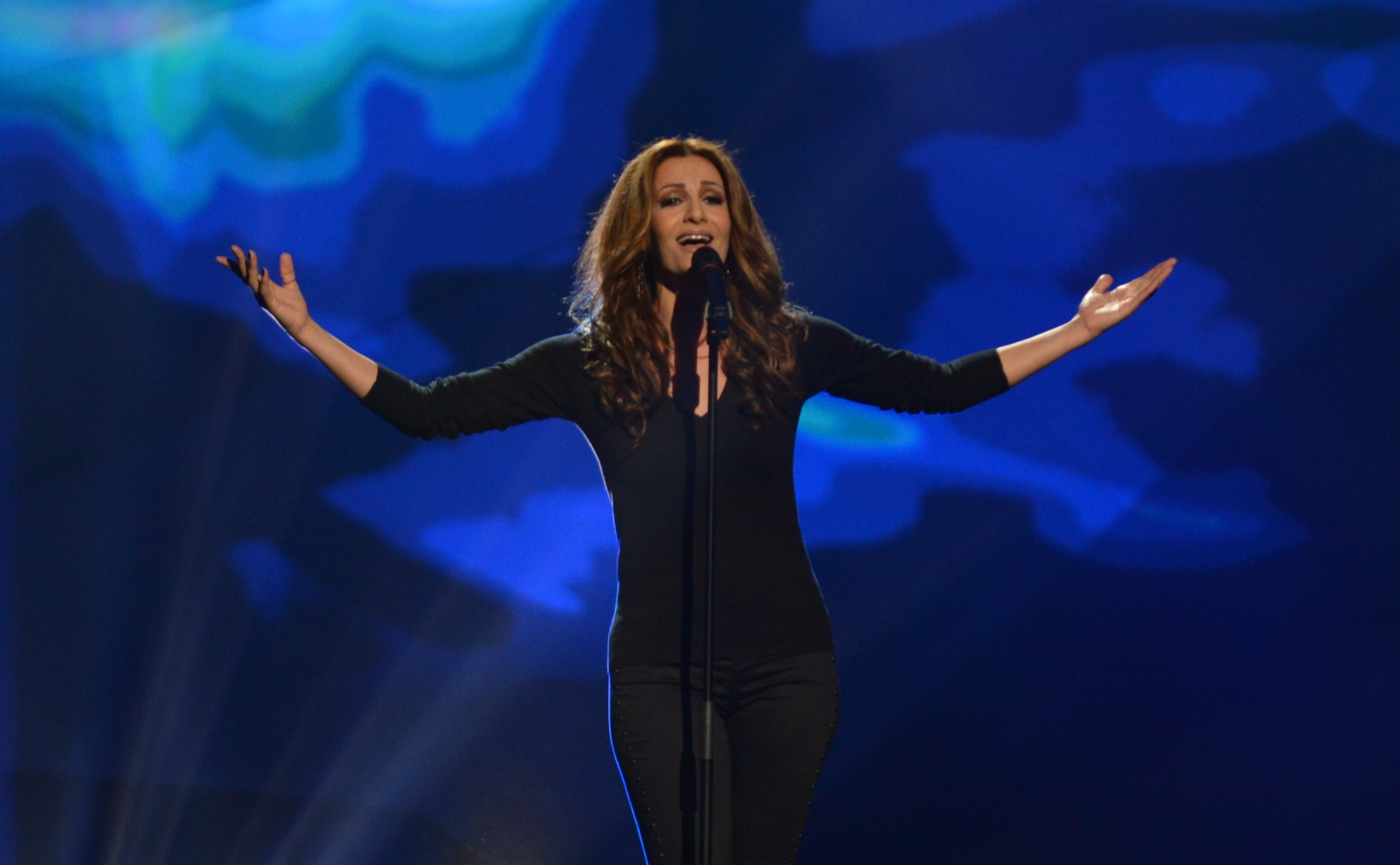
- Olympiou performing in 2013

Background information
- Also known as: Dena Olympiou
- Born: Despina Olympiou; 17 October 1975 (age 50); Limassol, Cyprus
- Genres: Pop; pop rock; laïko; éntekhno
- Occupation: Singer
- Instruments: Vocals; piano
- Years active: 1992–present
- Labels: MBI Xronos; Mercury; Heaven Music
- Partner(s): Michalis Hatzigiannis (2003-2009)

Despina Olympiou (Greek: Δέσποινα Ολυμπίου, pronounced [ˈðespina oliˈmbi.u]; born 17 October 1975), also known as Dena Olympiou, is a Greek Cypriot singer, famous in her homeland as well as in Greece. She represented Cyprus in the Eurovision Song Contest 2013 in Malmö, Sweden.

== Early life and education ==
Olympiou was born and raised in Limassol, Cyprus. She made her first steps in music in Cyprus. She moved to London and attended the Trinity College of Londοn where she studied piano and music theory.

== Career ==
=== 1992–2001: Start of career ===
She started her music career in 1992. A year later she moved to Athens, Greece, where she had a cooperation with Yiannis Parios. Olympiou has also cooperated with other Greek music artists, including Haris Alexiou, Michalis Hatzigiannis, Dimitris Mitropanos, Mimis Plessas, Pandelis Thalassinos and Marios Tokas.

She first appeared on the George Sarri album Ftaine oi Aponoi Kairoi with the song "I kounia mas" ("Our Swing"). Olympiou also appeared on the album Emeis oi Ellines with the song "Pros rakosillektes kai sinodiporous" and on the Pandelis Thalassinos album Ap' tin Tilo os tin Thraki with four songs.

Olympiou's first album, Ton Mation sou i Kalimera, includes music by Pandelis Thalassinos, Manoli Lidaki, Gerasimos Andreatos.

=== 2002–2006: Universal Music, Vale Mousiki, Exoume Logo and Auto Ine Agapi ===
In 2002, she signed to the Universal Greece label.

In June 2003, Olympiou started her cooperation with Michalis Hatzigiannis with the CD single Vale Mousiki with music by Hatzigiannis and lyrics by Eleana Vrachali. The album included a duet with Hatzigiannis, "Na 'soun allios", which was very successful. A year later the CD became platinum.

A year later, she released her second album with the name Exoume Logo. In 2005, Olympiou released her new album, Auto ine Agapi (This Is Love), including twelve songs written by Giorgos and Alexandros Pantelia (from Kitrina Podilata), apart from one song which was written by Lina Dimopoulou. The first single from the album was "Kapote".

=== 2007–2012: Pes to Dinata, Mazi Xorista, Mia stigmi ===
In the spring of 2007, she released the CD single Pes to Dinata, which was very successful both in Greece and Cyprus.

Later Olympiou released her album, Mazi Xorista once again cooperating with Michalis, with lyrics by Eleana Vrachali and Nikos Moraitis. The album was re-released in 2008, this time gold, and includes the song "Pes to Dinata", "Mazi Xorista" and her duet with Michalis Hatzigiannis, "O Paradisos (Den Ftiahtike Gia Mas)". The album also includes the new song "Omorfa Psemata", written by Michalis Hatzigiannis and Nikos Moraitis.

At the 2008 MAD Video Music Awards, she won the Best Duet award for the song "O Paradisos". In 2010, she releases her album entitled 'Mia stigmi', which became one of the most successful albums of that year, reaching Gold status in Cyprus. Considered as the most mature work by Despina, again penned by Michalis Hatzigiannis, included many hit singles like 'Pano stin agapi' which became a huge summer hit, 'Adynamia' and a very sentimental ballad entitled 'Mi m'agapas'.

In 2012, Despina collaborated with Stereo Mike on a new hit single entitled 'Den s' afino apo ta matia mou', a duet that met great success in Cyprus and Greece, and marked her first steps without Michalis Hatzigiannis on her side.

=== 2013: Eurovision Song Contest 2013 ===
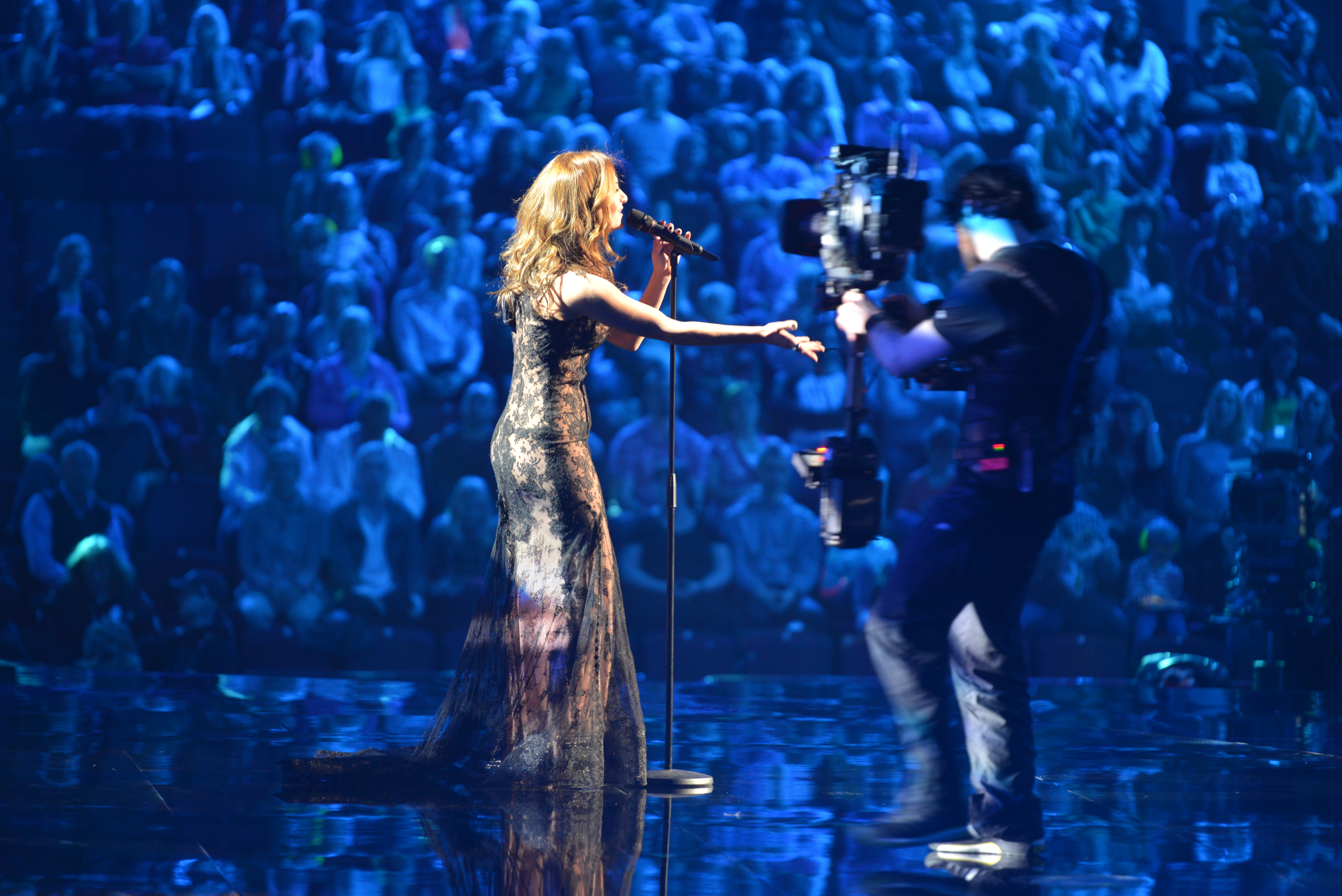
Olympiou performing at ESC 2013

On 1 February 2013, Cyprus Broadcasting Corporation announced that Olympiou had been internally selected to represent Cyprus in the Eurovision Song Contest 2013, held in Malmö, Sweden. On 14 February, the Greek language song "An me thimasai" (Αν με θυμάσαι) was presented as the Cypriot Contest entry. An English acoustic version and Spanish version were also prepared for promotional purposes. Olympiou competed in the first semi-final of the Contest on 14 May 2013, however, she failed to qualify to the final, getting the fifteenth place with eleven points.

Stereo Mike, the singer who Olympiou collaborated with on "Den s'afino apo ta matia mou", had also represented Greece in the Eurovision Song Contest 2011, held in Düsseldorf, Germany, along with Loukas Giorkas, with the song "Watch My Dance".

== Relationships ==
From 2003 to April 2009, Olympiou was in a relationship with Greek Cypriot singer Michalis Hatzigiannis. Since 2012, she has been in a relationship with Greek entrepreneur Panos Doukas. They had a son named Christos, born in September 2017.

== Discography ==
=== Albums ===
- Ton Mation Sou I Kalimera (2000)
- Echoume Logo (2004)
- Afto Einai Agapi (2005)
- Mazi Chorista (2007)
- Mazi Horista {Golden Edition} (2008)
- Mia stigmi (2009)

=== Singles ===
- Vale Mousiki (2003)
- Pes to Dynata (2007)
- Den S' Afino Ap Ta Matia Mou feat. Stereo Mike (2012)
- Na Eisai Kala (2012)
- An Me Thimase (2013)
- Stathera (2014)
- An Voulitho Na S' Arnitho (2014)
- Harisma Sou (2016)
- Girna Se Mena (2016)
- Panta Erhete I Avgi (2017)
- Opou Mas Paei I Kardia (2017)
- Mi Skeftis Xana (2020)
- Apousia (2021)

== See also ==
- List of Cypriots
- List of dance-pop artists
- Music of Greece
- Music of Cyprus

== Awards and nominations ==
=== Arion Music Awards ===
| Year | Recipient | Award | Result |
|---|---|---|---|
| 2004 | Echoume Log | Best Pop Singer | Nominated |
| 2006 | Afto Einai Agapi | Best Pop Singer | Nominated |

=== MAD Video Music Awards ===
| Year | Recipient | Award | Result |
|---|---|---|---|
| 2005 | Thymamai Osa Eiches Pei | Best Rock Video clip | Nominated |
| 2008 | O Paradisos (De Ftiahtike Gia Mas) (w/ Michalis Hatzigiannis) | Best Duet/Collaboration | Won |

| Preceded by Ivi Adamou with "La La Love" | Cyprus in the Eurovision Song Contest; 2013 | Succeeded by Giannis Karagiannis with "One Thing I Should Have Done" |
