= RIK 2 =

- Country: Cyprus
- Broadcast area: Cyprus
- Headquarters: Aglandjia, Nicosia, Cyprus

Programming
- Languages: Greek and English and Turkish

Ownership
- Owner: Cyprus Broadcasting Corporation
- Sister channels: RIK 1 RIK HD; RIK Sat

History
- Launched: 21 March 1992; 34 years ago

Links
- Website: www.cybc.com.cy

Availability

Streaming media
- RIK: RIK 2 Live

RIK 2 (Greek: ΡΙΚ 2) is a Cypriot television channel owned and operated by Cyprus Broadcasting Corporation. It was launched in 1992.

== History ==
RIK 2 was the second television channel to start in Cyprus, starting shortly before the first private television channel O Logos in April. Successful content in the 1990s included Latin American telenovelas and US soaps such as The Bold and the Beautiful, which, as of 2005, was still on air. As of the last week of 2023, RIK was the least-watched television channel in Cyprus, out of the six local services available terrestrially. Moreover, its viewing share is smaller than that of ERT World, which is available over-the-air in Cyprus.

== Programming ==
Broadcasts are typically in the Greek language, or in foreign languages with Greek subtitles.

Children's programs and sports programs are shown, alongside news bulletins, the news in Turkish and English, a daily broadcast (BIZ / WE) in Greek and Turkish addressing issues of interest to both Turkish and Greek Cypriots, as well as cultural shows, European news, foreign series and films.
