= Hovig Demirjian =

Greek Cypriot singer (born 1989)

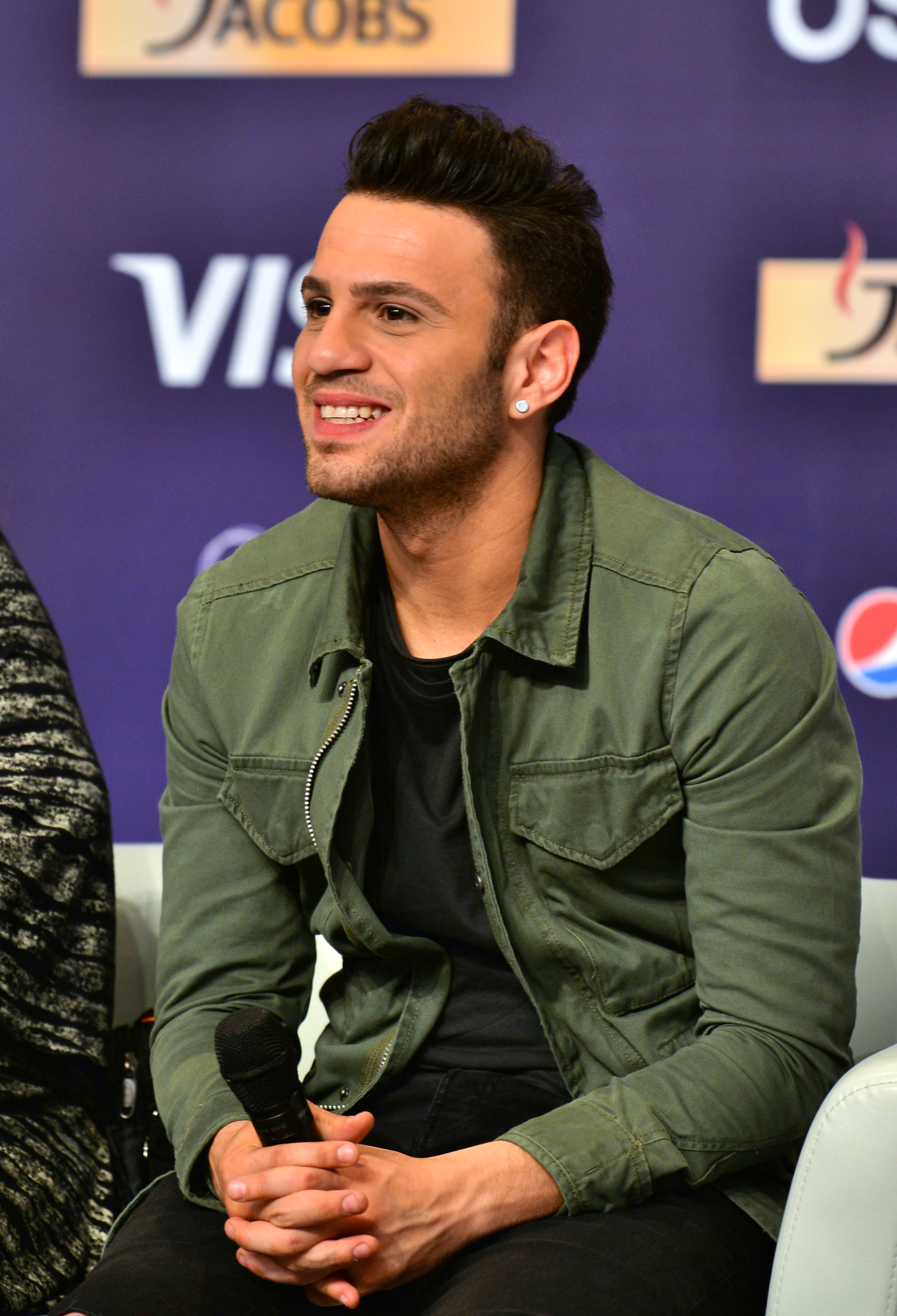
- Hovig Demirjian in 2017

Background information
- Born: 3 January 1989 (age 37); Nicosia, Cyprus
- Genre: Pop
- Occupation: Singer
- Years active: 2009–present
- Website: www.hovig-music.com

Hovig Demirjian (Greek: Χοβίγκ Ντεμιρτζιάν; Western Armenian: Յովիկ Տէմիրճեան; Eastern Armenian: Հովիկ Դեմիրճյան; born 3 January 1989), known professionally as Hovig, is a Greek Cypriot singer. He represented Cyprus in the Eurovision Song Contest 2017 with the song "Gravity", finishing in 21st place.

== Life and career ==
Hovig Demirjian or Demirdjian was born on 3 January 1989 in Nicosia, Cyprus and is of Armenian descent. He studied marketing and worked in business, but quickly gave up in order to become a singer. He learned to play the guitar and piano and also studied jazz and vocals. His first major achievement was placing second in a musical competition in Larnaca.

=== Greek X Factor ===
In 2009, Demirjian took part in the second season of The X Factor Greece broadcast on the Greek television station ANT1. He auditioned with the Greek song "Pote" (in Greek "Ποτέ") and qualified for the Boys (16-24) category mentored by Nikos Mouratidis. In the inaugural live show, he sang "How to Save a Life" from The Fray and in second week the Armenian-themed "Menos ektos" from Eleftheria Arvanitaki. In week 3 of the live shows he sang "Unchain My Heart" from Ray Charles and Joe Cocker followed by Bon Jovi's "You Give Love a Bad Name in week 4 and "With a Little Help from My Friends" from The Beatles and Joe Cocker in week 5. He continued with various interpretations like "(I Can't Get No) Satisfaction" from The Rolling Stones, "Feel from Robbie Williams and "You Can Leave Your Hat On" again from Cocker and "It's a Man's Man's Man's World". In the 11th live show, he performed two songs: the Greek-language "Pou Na Sai" from Antonis Remos and "Hello" from Lionel Richie. He ended up finishing in seventh place in the competition.

=== Eurovision Song Contest ===
Following The X Factor Greece, Demirjian competed to represent Cyprus in the Eurovision Song Contest on two occasions; 2010 and 2015. In 2010, he placed third with "Goodbye", and in 2015, he placed fourth with "Stone in a River".

On 21 October 2016, Demirjian was announced as the Cypriot entrant in the Eurovision Song Contest 2017. His song, "Gravity", was written by Swedish composer Thomas G:son and was released on March 1, 2017. He performed in the first semi-final of the contest and qualified to the final, where he placed 21st. The following two years, he was the Cypriot spokesperson.

== Discography ==
=== Singles ===
Title	Year	Peak chart positions	Album
Title	Year	SWE Heat	Album
"Den mou milas alithina" (Δεν μού μιλάς αληθινά - ιστορία έχει τελειώσει)	2009	—	Non-album singles
"Ksana" (Ξανά)	2010	—	Non-album singles
"Goodbye"	2010	—	Non-album singles
"Mystika" (Μυστικά)	2012	—	Non-album singles
"Ekho ya mena" (Εγώ για μένα)	2013	—	Non-album singles
"Stone in a River"	2015	—	Non-album singles
"Gravity"	2017	11	Non-album singles
"Words Are Never Easy"	2018	—	Non-album singles
"Hayi Achqer" (in Armenian: Հայի Աչքեր)	2021	—	Non-album singles
"Lusabats | Gnórimi Skiá" (with Arpi) (Armenian: Լուսաբաց | Greek: Γνώριμη Σκιά)	2021	—	Non-album singles
"—" denotes a single that did not chart or was not released.

Awards and achievements
Preceded by Minus One with "Alter Ego"	Cyprus in the Eurovision Song Contest; 2017	Succeeded by Eleni Foureira with "Fuego"
