= Pieros Kezou =

Cypriot composer, songwriter, and singer

Pieros Kezou is a Cypriot composer, songwriter, and singer.

== Biography ==
Pieros Kezou was born in Paralimni, Cyprus on 15 November. Growing up in the first difficult years of the islands (Cyprus) recent turbulent history, Pieros showed early signs of maturity and a high interest in music. Ηe would lock himself in his room with a voice recorder and a small synthesizer, composing and singing his first musical pieces. His teachers, recognizing his talent, would very often give him the chance to present his work at school shows and productions.

At the age of 18, he moved to Nicosia for his studies. He lives there since and works as a music teacher in primary education. During his studies he was again given the chance to compose and perform. It was very clear to him that he didn't want to follow the usual musical norms in both the music and the lyrics, thus he's trying to create a more pioneer and authentic sound for his work.

He took part in various competitions as a performer, including The Laiki Bank Song Contest For Young Cypriot Artists, The Lions of Cyprus Song Contest and as a backing vocalist for the local Eurovision Song Contest preselections.

Aiming to discover a new musical performing approach he decided to follow lessons in classical singing and musical with soprano Tiziana Sojat. He has since performed songs of classical/musical repertoire as a soloist in various occasions. He has collaborated with sopranos Marilena Solomou, Maria Poulli, Tiziana Sojat, singing demanding pieces like "Bring Him Home" from Les Misérables, "Tonight" from the West Side Story, etc.

He has recorded songs for the theatre for children and songs of other composers like Michalis Roussos, Yiorgos Fylaktou and Guy Creen. He took part in the CYBC series "Artos kai Theamata", performing songs from the Cypriot Theatre and Operetta.

== Inspiration ==
Although Pieros performed in a wide variety of genres, his real love is for the mainstream and contemporary music scene. Influenced by Brian Eno, Jean Michel Jarre and Vangelis, he has composed orchestral music combining electro music, ethnic music and avant garde music elements. Moreover, his recent work of the last couple of years, is concentrating in song writing. Influenced by Kate Bush, David Bowie, Suede, Depeche Mode, Antony and the Johnsons, he's writing songs with very personal and revealing, mainly in English lyrics, finished with interesting orchestrations and sensitive vocal touches. He is inspired not only from personal circumstances but also from the lives of people who surround him. He is often in his work self-sarcastic, other times observing, demonstrating and challenging taboo issues.

== Work in progress ==
Pieros is currently preparing his collection of songs entitled "Songs made of beautiful tears". Songs that are possible candidates for his new album are: "Authorised Biography", "The Witch Song", "Digital Boyfriends", "Concern", and "Stilnox" as well as some instrumental songs he composed.

== Eurovision 2009 ==
Pieros Kezou was one of the contestants of the 2009 Cypriot Eurovision National Selection Final hosted by local TV station CYBC. His song "Bleed 4 U" is a dark song with an edgy electronic pop sound. "Bleed 4 U" was written, composed, and will be performed by Pieros as he also did all the backing vocals himself. He describes his Eurovision entry as "Pet shop boys doing a Depeche mode cover with a touch of Goldfrapp somewhere".
