= Giannis Karagiannis =

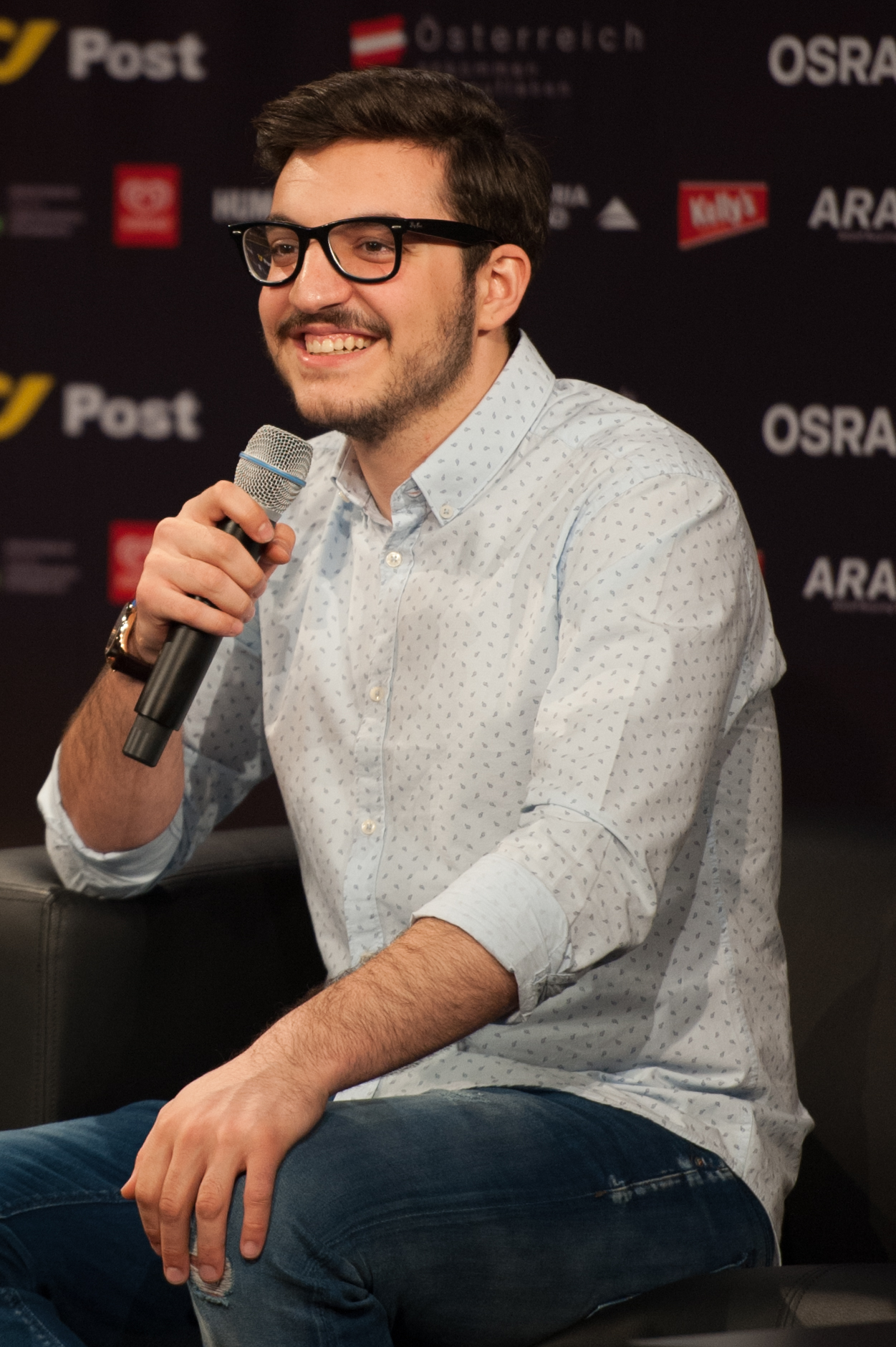
- Karagiannis in 2015

Background information
- Also known as: John Karayiannis
- Born: 25 July 1994 (age 32); Limassol, Cyprus
- Genre: Pop
- Occupations: Singer, songwriter
- Instrument: Vocals

Giannis Karagiannis (Greek: Γιάννης Καραγιάννης) (born 25 July 1994), sometimes credited as John Karayiannis, is a Cypriot singer and songwriter who represented Cyprus in the Eurovision Song Contest 2015 with the song "One Thing I Should Have Done". Previously he tried to represent Cyprus in their national final for the Junior Eurovision Song Contest in 2007 and 2008.

== Discography ==
=== Singles ===
Title	Year	Peak chart positions	Album
Title	Year	AUT	Album
"One Thing I Should Have Done"	2015	61	—N/a

== See also ==
- Cyprus in the Eurovision Song Contest 2015

Awards and achievements
Preceded by Despina Olympiou with "An me thimasai"	Cyprus in the Eurovision Song Contest; 2015	Succeeded by Minus One with "Alter Ego"
