= Minus One (band) =

Cypriot rock band

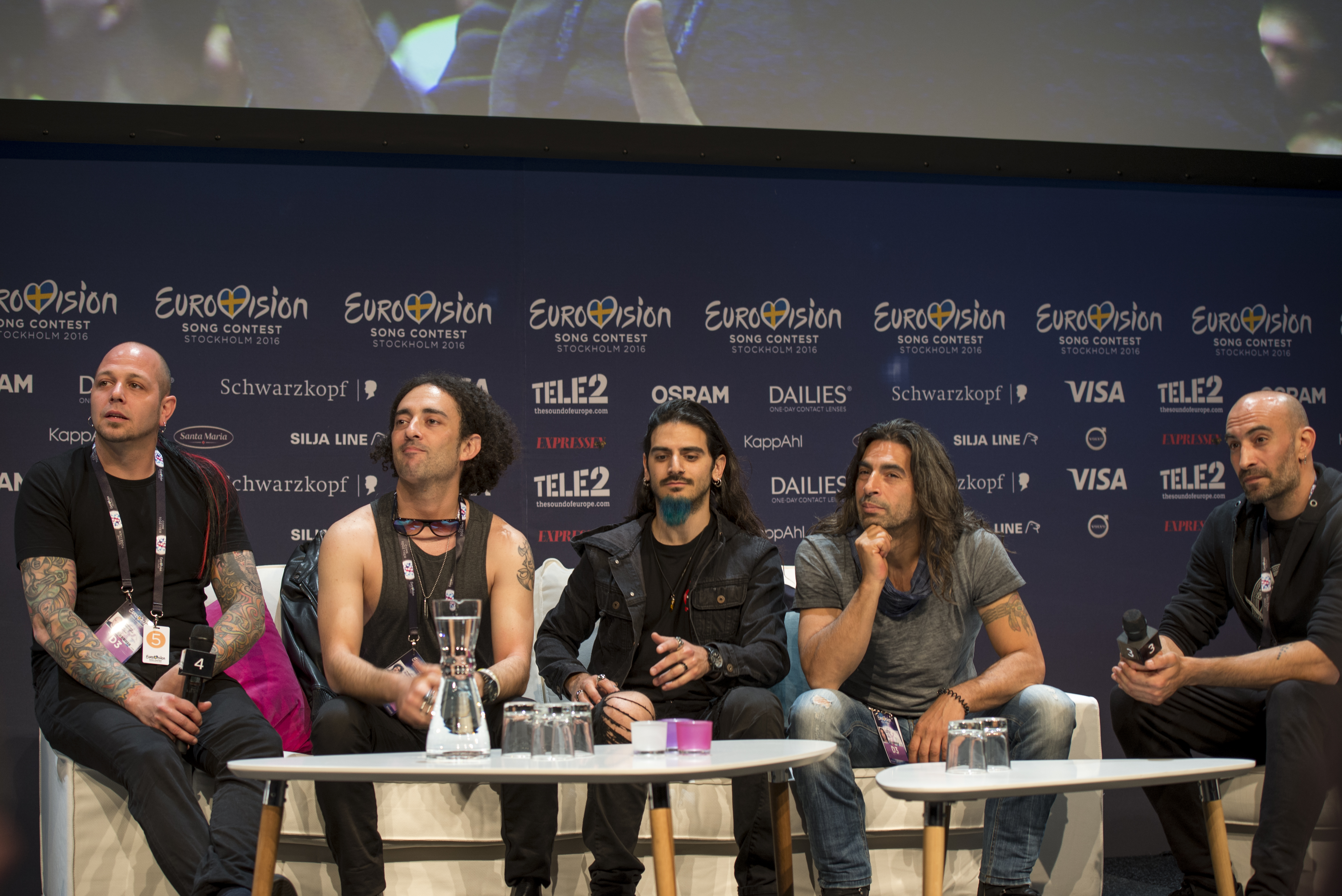
- Minus One in May 2016

Background information
- Origin: Nicosia, Cyprus
- Genres: Rock
- Years active: 2009–present
- Members: Andreas Kapatais; Constantinos Amerikanos; Harrys Pari; Orestis Savva; Christopher Ioannides

Minus One are a Cypriot rock band formed in Nicosia in 2009. They gained prominence in 2016 for representing Cyprus in the Eurovision Song Contest.

== History ==
Minus One began as a cover band, but later started performing their own music.

They tried to represent Cyprus in the Eurovision Song Contest 2015 with the song "Shine", but placed third in the national final. After being internally selected, they represented Cyprus in the Eurovision Song Contest 2016 with the song "Alter Ego", which they co-wrote with Swedish musician Thomas G:son. The band reached 8th place with 164 points in the semi-final, and finished in 21st place with 96 points in the final.

As a part of their "Alter Ego Tour" in 2016, the band performed in Amsterdam, Limassol, London, and Moscow.

In February 2017, they opened for British musician Glenn Hughes on his Resonate Tour in Vienna, Bologna, and Milan. On 16 December 2017, the band released a cover of the 1964 song "You Don't Own Me", originally performed by Lesley Gore. In the Minus One version, the band is joined by 15-year-old Cypriot singer Semeli Panayiotou.

Minus One's first album, Red Black White, was released on 14 December 2018. It was recorded at Medley Studios in Copenhagen and released by Danish label Mighty Music.

== Band members ==
=== Current ===
- Andreas Kapatais – lead vocals
- Constantinos Amerikanos – guitar, keys, backing vocals
- Harrys Pari – guitar
- Orestis Savva – bass
- Christopher Ioannides – drums

=== Previous ===
- Francois Micheletto – lead vocals
- George Solonos – guitar, backing vocals
- Antonis Loizides – bass
- Maxim Theofanides – bass

== Discography ==
=== Studio albums ===
- Red Black White - 2018
- Got It Covered - 2021

=== EP ===
- The Bologna Season - 2017

==== Singles ====
- Alter Ego - 2016
- The Potato Song - 2016
- Save Me - 2016
- You Don't Own Me - 2017
- Girl - 2018
- What's Up - 2019
- My Girl - Where Did You Sleep Last Night - 2020
- What's Up? - 2021
- Oh Pretty Woman - 2021

Awards and achievements
Preceded by Giannis Karagiannis with "One Thing I Should Have Done"	Cyprus in the Eurovision Song Contest; 2016	Succeeded by Hovig with "Gravity"
