= Zeliş Şenol =

Turkish Cypriot singer

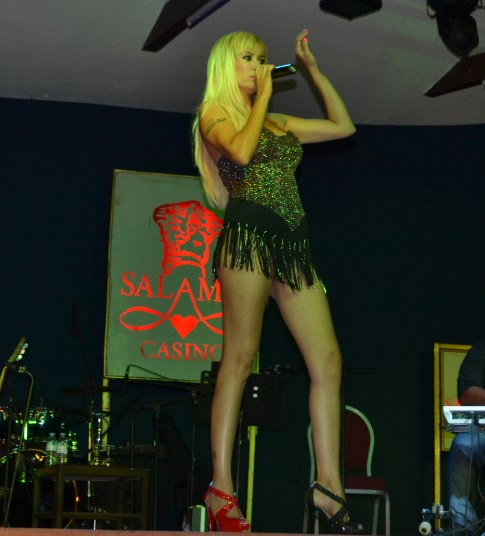
- Zeliş Şenol performing at Salamis Hotel in Famagusta, Cyprus

Background information
- Born: March 25, 1985 (age 40); Nicosia, Cyprus
- Genres: Jazz; Pop; Soul
- Occupation(s): Singer, Actor
- Years active: 2000 – Present
- Labels: Azza Records

Zeliş Şenol (born March 25, 1985), sometimes called simply Zelis or Mr. Zel is a Turkish Cypriot singer who was born in Nicosia.

== Career ==
She has been involved with music from a young age and has taken part in a number of festivals and toured all the major cities of Cyprus. She has also worked with Grammy winner, Billy Paul and sung in a concert with Billy Cobham. In 2007, she sang in the Europalia Festival in Berlin. She is a member of Larkos Larkos's music group "Kyprogenia."

She also studied acting at Near Eastern University, and has performed at Nicosia Municipal Theatre since 2013.
