= Hellenic TV =

- Country: United Kingdom

Programming
- Picture format: 16:9

History
- Launched: 9 December 1990

Links
- Website: www.hellenictv.net

Hellenic TV (HTV) is a United Kingdom-based Greek language television channel broadcasting from studios in London. It was established in 1990 to serve the city's Greek community, and is based in Harringey. The station began its life airing locally to thirteen households, but within a year, its customer base had expanded to over 1,000 subscribers. Hellenic TV was the UK's first foreign-language television service to be granted a broadcasting licence by the Independent Television Commission, and transmits programme output from local contributors, as well as from Greece's ERT and Cyprus's RIK networks. The channel is available via cable television, through Freeview's Channelbox service in the UK and since 2006 has been available worldwide as one of a number of channels airing Greek language programmes.
