= RIK 1 =

Television channel

- Country: Cyprus
- Broadcast area: Cyprus
- Headquarters: Aglandjia, Nicosia, Cyprus

Programming
- Language: Greek

Ownership
- Owner: Cyprus Broadcasting Corporation
- Sister channels: RIK 2 RIK HD; RIK Sat

History
- Launched: 1 October 1957; 69 years ago
- Former names: CBS; CyBC TV (1959); CyBC One (1992)

Links
- Website: www.cybc.com.cy

Availability

Streaming media
- RIK: RIK 1 Live

RIK 1 (Greek: ΡΙΚ 1) is a Cypriot television channel owned and operated by Cyprus Broadcasting Corporation. It was launched in 1957.

== History ==
The channel opened on 1 October 1957 as CBS TV, broadcasting from VHF channel 2 in Nicosia, in 1959, the corporation changed its name to CyBC, RIK in Greek.

Until 1992, RIK was the only television channel in the country, a position it held for 34 1/2 years until March 1992, when RIK 2 started broadcasting, and later in April, the private channel O Logos. By the early 1990s, RIK opened at 5pm and its programming was still relatively limited. During the 1990s, the station broadcast from VHF channel 6 atop Mount Olympus, which also maintained two supplementary 10kw transmitters carrying RIK 2 and the ET1 relay.

In the last week of 2023, RIK 1 had an audience share of 9.2%, behind Omega TV Cyprus, ANT1 Cyprus and Alpha TV Cyprus.

== Programming ==
RIK subtitled its foreign imports only in Greek, as RIK believed that adding Turkish subtitles would fill the screen with lines of text. As of 1979, the majority of the programming was in English and Greek, with Turkish-language programming being limited to daily news bulletins and a twice-weekly current affairs magazine programme. The Turkish-speaking output is now carried on RIK 2.
