= Lisa Andreas =

English-Cypriot singer (born 1987)

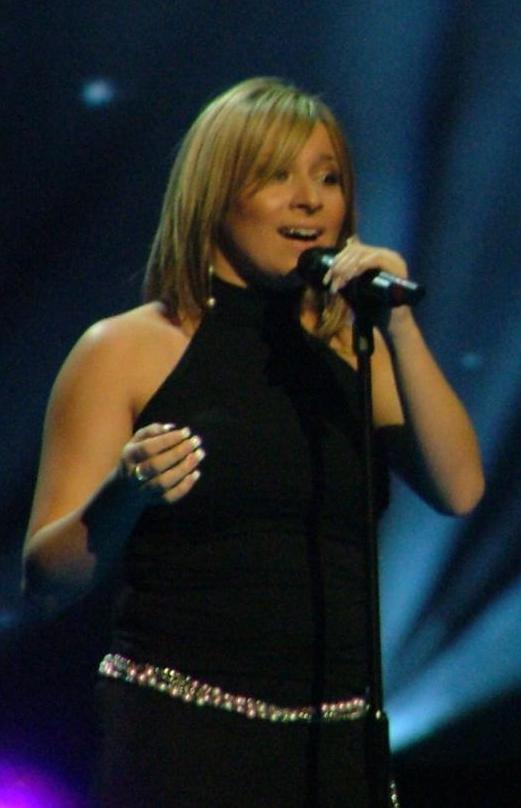
- Lisa Andreas during a rehearsal at the Eurovision Song Contest 2004 in Istanbul
- Born: Lisa Large; 22 December 1987 (age 38); England
- Occupation: Singer
- Musical career
- Origin: Kent, England
- Instrument: Vocals

Lisa Jayne Porter (née Large; 22 December 1987), better known by the stage name Lisa Andreas (Greek: Λίζα Αντρέας), is an English-Cypriot singer, dancer and artist, best known for representing Cyprus in the Eurovision Song Contest 2004 with the song "Stronger Every Minute".

== Early life ==
Andreas was born in England to a British father and Greek Cypriot mother. She was christened in Cyprus, where she lived for two-and-a-half years, before moving with her family to Gillingham.

She attended Chatham Grammar School for Girls. She graduated from the Trinity Laban Conservatoire of Music and Dance with a bachelor's degree in Voice and Musical Theatre.

== Career ==
At the age of 13, Andreas began performing as a solo artist, singing mainly in pubs and karaoke competitions; winning one held at The Strand in Gillingham, Kent.

On 26 January 2004 it was announced that Andreas had been selected to compete in the Cypriot national selection for the Eurovision Song Contest 2004 with the song "Stronger Every Minute". She later went on to win the competition with 96 points, earning her the right to represent the country at the contest. Andreas, then 16 years old, was the youngest participant selected to take part in the 2004 contest. Following her selection, the song, which featured one line in Greek, was reworked to be performed entirely in the English language. In Istanbul, she performed 14th during the semi-final and qualified for the grand final, where she later placed 5th overall with a total of 170 points.

Following her participation, Andreas joined a female hip-hop dance troupe, performing at the London Palladium and Her Majesty's Theatre. She later worked as a teacher at a dance school.

In 2007, she participated in the fourth series of The X Factor, where she advanced to the second round.

== Personal life ==
In 2014, she moved to Tucson, Arizona, where she currently resides with her family.

Preceded by Stelios Konstantas with Feeling Alive	Cyprus in the Eurovision Song Contest; 2004	Succeeded by Constantinos Christoforou with Ela Ela (Come Baby)
