= Marlain Angelides =

Greek singer

Marlain
- Born: Maria Eleni Mandalena; Athens, Greece
- Origin: Nicosia, Cyprus
- Genres: Rock, pop, dance
- Occupation: Singer
- Years active: 1998–present
- Website: http://www.marlainangel.com

Marlain Angelides (Greek: Μαρλέν Αγγελίδου) is a Cypriot singer. She was a member of the Greek girl group Hi-5, and represented Cyprus in the Eurovision Song Contest 1999 with the "Tha 'Ne Erotas" song. Angelidou, her mother, and her siblings all have dual nationality (Greek Cypriot and British).

== Life ==
Marlain Angelides was born in Athens, Greece on 6 September 1978 to a Cypriot-born father of mainland Greek origin and a mother of half-Scottish and half-Cypriot descent. She emigrated to Venezuela at the age of 5, learning fluent Spanish (which she has since forgotten). She then moved to Belgium, and later back to Cyprus, where she lived during her teenage years on her father's request to return home. Angelides is currently based in New York, although her mother, father, and brother remain in Cyprus.

Marlain Angelides completed a BS in Biochemistry with Management at Imperial College London before studying at Boston Conservatory in the US. She also obtained a Postgraduate Diploma in Musical Theatre from London's Royal Academy of Music.

== Career ==
She made her professional debut as the lead in the Stavros Sideras musical Pygmalion, The True Story (Aphrodite/Galatea) opposite Peter Polycarpou. Her professional career started in 1999–2000 with the production of Aznavour's Lautrec in London's West End. During 2000–2002 she starred in lead roles in musicals such as Hair (Dionne), and Elegies for Angels, Punks and Raging Queens (Judith), toured the UK with Living La Vida Loca (Fantasia), Legends of Swing (singing Ella Fitzgerald songs) and toured Europe with Flower Power Musical Story (Lainer) and Broadway Musical Gala (Principal Soloist) where she had the opportunity to sing solo in front of 11,000 at La Scala in Milan. At the same time, she appeared in performances at the Berklee Performance Centre, in Boston, USA, Festival Rose D’Or in Juan-les-Pins, France, some charity events in Basel, Switzerland, and Dublin, Ireland and in concerts with the Cyprus State Orchestra as a soloist.

At the end of 2002, at the BBC Radio 2 Voice of Musical Theatre International Competition in Cardiff, Wales, she was the semi-final winner and one of only six finalists.

=== Eurovision ===
Angelides has taken part in a number of Cypriot pre-selections to the Eurovision Song Contest, namely in 1998, 1999, 2008, and 2009 and was successful in winning and representing Cyprus in 1999.

In her first attempt in 1998, she came second with the song "Fterougisma", which was performed by Marlain and Alex Panayi.

In 1999, she was more successful with her song "Tha 'Ne Erotas" winning the Cypriot pre-selection event and represented Cyprus in the Eurovision Song Contest 1999.

In 2008, Angelides participated in the Cypriot pre-selection for the third time, this time with the song "Rejection (Set Me Free)", which placed third in the pre-selection.

Her last participation in the Cypriot pre-selection for the Eurovision was in 2009 when her hard rock titled "Mr Do Right One Night Stand" performed by Marlain and The Diesel Sisters placed seventh.

=== In Hi-5 ===
In 2003, she took part in the Greek television contest Pop Stars, winning one of the five spots in a teen girl's group that was to be formed on the basis of the show's outcome. The group was named Hi-5 and released a self-titled album in 2003 that went gold in Greece. The band has had hit songs such as "Xero Ti Zitao", "To Tyhero Asteri", and "Yennithika Xana". Hi-5 released three studio albums, the self-titled Hi-5 and Mia Nichta San ki Afti both in 2003 and Makria Apo Afti ti Gi in 2004. The group parted quietly off-screen in 2005 on good terms after two years together to pursue solo careers.

=== After Hi-5 ===
From 2005 to 2008, Marlain then continued singing rock with various bands in clubs and festivals around Greece, namely Volume (Christophoros Chrokides, Stephanos Demetriou, Dimitris Frosinis) and Dickens’ Zoo. With N.U.R.V. she played the popular European Music Day at Syntagma Square in Athens and the River Party in Kastoria.

She also played the leading role in the West End Athens version of the musical Saturday Night Fever (Stephanie Mangano).

She has collaborated with major artists in Greece, namely Greek rock star Vasilis Papakonstantinou in his concert tours of Greece and is currently touring Greece, Cyprus, USA, Europe and Africa with pop artist Michalis Hadzigiannis.

Being a fan of cartoons, Marlain also lends her voice regularly to cartoon voice-over translations for Disney and DreamWorks playing a variety of characters from Mulan in Mulan II, to Lady Bug in James and the Giant Peach, the Soul Singer in Kronk's New Groove, Rita the Dog in Oliver & Company, the country-western singer Dixie dubbing the voice of Reba McEntire in The Fox and the Hound 2, and many others.

She created a collection of songs entitled Bedroom Rock. Her first performance as a solo act is live in various clubs at the moment in Athens.

Her CD single "Being Blonde Today" was released in January 2011.

Preceded by Michalis Hadjiyiannis with Genesis	Cyprus in the Eurovision Song Contest; 1999	Succeeded by Voice with Nomiza
