= Cyprus Broadcasting Corporation =

Public radio and television outlet

Cyprus Broadcasting Corporation: Ραδιοφωνικό Ίδρυμα Κύπρου (Greek); Kıbrıs Radyo Yayın Kurumu (Turkish)
- Type: Broadcast radio and television
- Country: Cyprus
- Availability: Europe, North America and Australia
- Owner: Republic of Cyprus
- Key people: Michalis P. Michael, Chairman; Thanasis Tsokos, Director General
- Launch date: 4 October 1953; 72 years ago (radio); 1 October 1957; 68 years ago (television)
- Former names: Cyprus Broadcasting Service (1953–1959)
- Official website: rik.cy

Cyprus Broadcasting Corporation (Greek: Ραδιοφωνικό Ίδρυμα Κύπρου, romanized: Radiofonikó Ídryma Kýprou; Turkish: Kıbrıs Radyo Yayın Kurumu), or CyBC (Greek: ΡΙΚ, romanized: RIK; Turkish: KRYK), is Cyprus' public broadcasting service. It transmits island-wide on four radio and two domestic television channels, and uses one satellite channel for the Cypriot diaspora. It also transmits on a separate high definition channel.

CyBC is a public broadcaster, meaning it is non profit and thus has no shareholders.

CyBC was partially funded by a tax on electric bills, a practice which ended on 1 July 2000; CyBC is currently funded by the state budget. The amount of the tax was dependent on the size of the home and, as a hypothecated tax for public television, was similar in principle to the television licence systems in other countries. The corporation is a member of the international broadcasting community, belonging to the European Broadcasting Union (EBU), the Broadcasting Organisation of Non-Aligned Countries (BONAC) and the Commonwealth Broadcasting Association (CBA).

== History and legal framework ==
CyBC began as the Cyprus Broadcasting Service, with its first radio broadcast at 17:00 on Sunday, 4 October 1953. Programmes were broadcast in Greek, Turkish and English on 434 and 495 metres medium wave (691 and 606 kilohertz). The station provided a free weekly broadcast known as Radio Cyprus.

Television broadcasting began on 1 October 1957. Broadcasts were initially five days a week, averaging three hours a day, and the service covered a radius of 33 kilometres from Nicosia.

On 1 January 1959, the CBS ceased to be a government department and was renamed the Cyprus Broadcasting Corporation under Chapter 300A of the Cyprus Broadcasting Corporation Act. The corporation was modelled in part on the British Broadcasting Corporation. CyBC was admitted as an associate member of the European Broadcasting Union on 1 January 1964, becoming an active member five years later.

As the state broadcaster, CBC is responsible for implementing the Constitution of the Republic of Cyprus. According to Article 171 of the constitution:

In sound and vision broadcasting there shall be programmes both for the Greek and the Turkish Communities. The time allocated to programmes for the Turkish Cypriot Community in sound broadcasting shall not be less than 75 hours in a seven-day week, spread to all days of such week in daily normal periods of transmission: Provided that if the total period of transmissions has to be reduced so that the time allotted to programs for the Greek Community should fall below 75 hours in a seven-day week, then the time allotted to programmes for the Turkish Community in any such week should be reduced by the same number of hours as that by which the time allotted to programmes for the Greek Community is reduced below such hours: Provided further that if the time allotted to programmes for the Greek Community is increased above 140 hours in a 7-day week, then the time allotted to programmes for the Turkish Community shall be increased in the ratio of 3 hours for the Turkish Community to every 7 hours for the Greek Community.

In vision broadcasting there shall be allotted three transmission days to the programmes for the Turkish Community of every ten consecutive transmission days and the total time allotted to the programmes for the Turkish Community in such ten transmission days shall be in the ratio of three hours to seven hours allotted to programmes for the Greek-Hellenic Community in such ten transmission days.

All official broadcasts in sound and vision shall be made both in Greek and Turkish and shall not be taken into account for the purposes of calculating the time under this Article.

Article 19 of the Cyprus Broadcasting Corporation Act (Chapter 300A) states:

The Corporation (CyBC) shall conduct the broadcasting services with impartial attention to the interests and susceptibilities of the different communities and with due regard to the interests of minority communities in the Republic. The Corporation shall operate the broadcasting services in the Greek, Turkish and English languages and any other languages at its discretion and shall at all times keep a fair balance in the allocation of broadcasting hours and other matters between these languages.

== Television ==
RIK TV logo (2008–2015)

CyBC operates three domestic channels (CyBC 1, CyBC 2 and CyBC HD) and an international service (RIK Sat) for the Cypriot diaspora. It also carries Euronews, and ERT World. On 1 July 2011 all analogue television transmissions ended, and CyBC broadcasts on its own DVB-T network.

=== RIK 1 ===
RIK 1 features news and current-affairs programming in Greek: political, financial and sports news; documentaries and feature films, operas, concerts, ballets and plays.

=== RIK 2 ===
RIK 2 primarily carries entertainment programming: Cypriot and foreign series, feature films, Cypriot and foreign movies, music and children's programmes. It also broadcasts news in Greek, Turkish and English. Since 1 February 1993, PIK2 has simulcast Euronews as part of its daily schedule (about 80 hours per week).

=== RIK HD ===
RIK HD channel simulcasts domestic and international special events along with the standard-definition channels. Events simulcast in HD by CyBC in 2013 included Formula 1 auto racing, Grand Prix motorcycle racing, the Eurovision Song Contest and the FIFA Confederations Cup.

=== RIK Satellite ===
RIK Satellite logo

RIK Satellite is the international service of RIK TV, broadcasting to Europe and North America. It is currently available as a free-to-air service in Europe on the Hellas Sat 2 and Eutelsat 33E satellites and as a digital terrestrial television channel in Greece.

In North America, Titan Television is the distributor for Canada and the United States. On 23 September 2014, the channel debuted in Canada on Bell Fibe TV.

== Radio ==
CyBC has four radio channels (First, Second, Third and Fourth), which aim to transmit quality programs and provide information, culture and entertainment to all communities in Cyprus. Programs are broadcast in a number of languages 24 hours a day and are also available via satellite and on the Internet.

=== First Channel ===
The First Channel known as RIK Proto (CyBC Radio 1) features news, current affairs, educational and cultural programmes on 963 and 693 kHz AM and 97.2, 92.4, 105 and 91.4 MHz FM. It has programming for children and young adults on history and classical, modern and traditional music. Since 27 June 1999 CyBC has broadcast a program for Maronites, The Voice of Maronites. A programme for the Catholic community began on 13 November 1999.

=== Second Channel ===
This channel, known as RIK Deftero (CyBC Radio 2), is a service for Cyprus's Turkish and Armenian communities. The Armenian broadcast is from 17:00 to 18:00 daily. The broadcast to the Turkish Cypriots aims to maintain ties with them, and programming includes three news bulletins daily (at 07:30, 13:15 and 16:50). The Second Channel is on 91.1, 93.1, 94.2 and 97.9 MHz FM is streamed online at www.cybc.com.cy and can also be heard on Hellas Sat in Africa, Europe and the Middle East.

=== Third Channel ===
The Third Channel, known as RIK Triton (CyBC Radio 3) the most popular CyBC channel in Cyprus, is primarily an entertainment and information channel on 603 and 1044 kHz AM and 94.8, 94, 96 and 106.7 MHz FM.

=== Fourth Channel ===
The Fourth Channel is known as RIK Classic (CyBC Classic) and presents classical, jazz and classic rock music on 88.2, 90.2, 90.5 and 100.9 MHz FM.

=== External Service ===
CyBC Greek-language programming is available for Greek Cypriot expatriates in the United Kingdom on weekends via shortwave radio. The External Service uses a transmitter, operated by VT Communications, which is also used for BBC World Service programming in the area. The External Service daily news broadcast is also rebroadcast in the United Kingdom by the UK radio station London Greek Radio.

== Logos ==
2000–2015

2015–2017

2017–present

== See also ==
- Television in Cyprus
- Hellenic TV (this channel on Channelbox broadcasts a number of programmes from RIK Sat in the UK)
