= Dj Bobito =

DJ Bobito
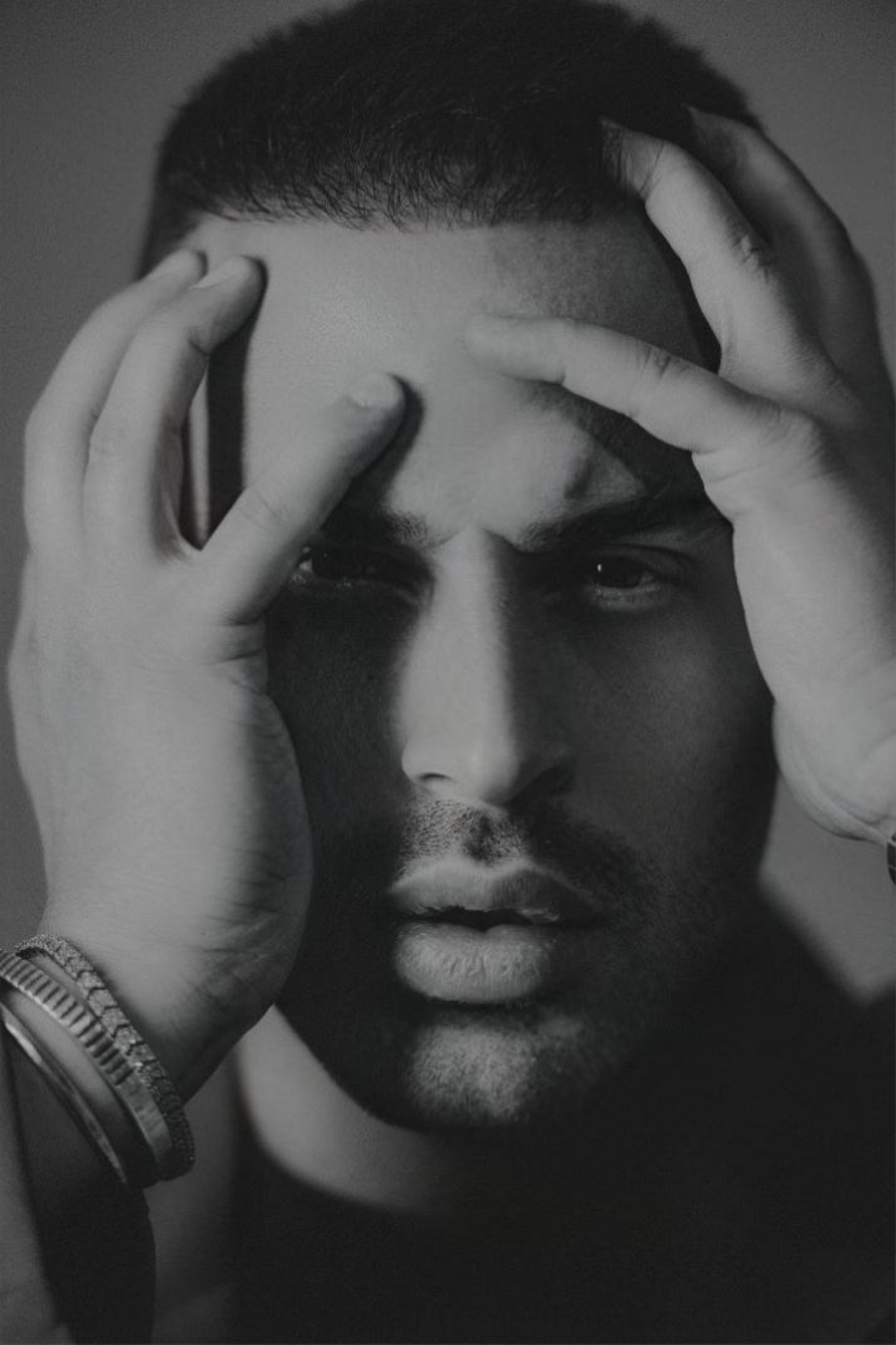

Background information
- Also known as: Bobito; Beat Les oDDmUSIC
- Born: Nikos Tzemanakis; Athens, Greece
- Origin: Crete
- Genres: Pop; Electronic; House music R&B
- Occupations: DJ record producer songwriter entrepreneur
- Instrument: Piano
- Years active: 2003 - present
- Labels: Panik Records; Ultra Records; Heaven Music
- Website: Official website

Nikos Tzemanakis (Greek: Νίκος Τζεμανάκης) also known as DJ Bobito, Beat-Les and oDDmUSIC is a Greek DJ, record producer, songwriter and entrepreneur. He is widely known for his song “El Telephone” featuring Eleni Foureira which peaked at the no.1 spot on the Greek national music chart and became the first Diamond Awards Sales in Greece. His song "Miss You" which was released in 2011, has been featured in Buddha Bar compilation albums in 2014. Bobito has collaborated with multiple musicians including Eleni Foureira, Konstantinos Argyros, Petros Iakovidis, Lena Zevgara, Josephine, Lefteris Pantazis, Claydee, Demy, Vegas and several others. He is currently signed with the Greek record label Panik Records.

== Early life ==
Bobito was born in Athens, Greece. He attended Technological Educational Institute of Piraeus where he studied electronics. Later, he attended SAE Institute in Athens where he studied electronic music production at the same time he studied classical piano at Conservatory of Vari.

== Career ==
Bobito started his professional career in the mid-2000s as a resident DJ at some of the prominent nightclubs in Athens. In 2011, Bobito wrote and produced "Miss You (Son Of The Sun)" for the Greek artist Alexandros Christopoulos. The same year, he produced the official remix of Vegas (band)' song "Fili" which was released on Warner Music.

Bobito collaborated with Claydee for "Mamacita Buena (System B & MV Mars Remix)" which was released by Ultra Records in 2012. "Miss You" was re-released in the early 2014 on one of the largest compilation album worldwide, Buddha Bar. Later that year, Bobito collaborated with Lefteris Pantazis and co-wrote the song "Erotas", the single was released by Heaven Music. By 2022, the song had garnered over 6 million views on YouTube.

In the late 2014, Bobito released his first single Kati Na Nioso featuring the Greek pop artist Josephine. The single was released by Panik Records. Between 2015 and 2016, he collaborated with Barrice and Demy and released three official remixes including "Rodino Oneiro", "Zitima Zois Kai Thanatou " and "Epimeno". During those years, Bobito released his second single "Agapi Mono" featuring Barrice on Spider Music. The single received positive reviews from several music news outlets. In May 2016, Bobito was invited as a judge and coach at Amita Motion Positive Battles where he worked till 2022.

In 2018, Bobito performed during Colour Day Festival held at the Athens Olympic Sports Complex. He became the resident DJ at the Colour Day Festival in 2019 and performed live act with Lila Trianti. Later that year, he also performed at Dreamland Festival which was also held at the Athens Olympic Sports Complex.

In 2020, Bobito co-founded Major Studios, a music production company.

In 2022, "El Telephone" featuring Bobito and Eleni Foureira was released on Panik Records. Bobito produced and co-wrote the song. "El Telephone" reached the top spot at the Greek national music chart and became the first Diamond Awards Sales in Greece. The same year, Bobito composed the remixed version of the song which also reached the no. 1 spot on the Greek charts. Also in 2022, he wrote and produced "Sentoni" by Giorgos Livanis which was released on Panik Records.

During his career as a musician, Bobito has performed all over Greece as well as in the countries like United States, South Africa, France, Germany,United Kingdom., Bulgaria, Romania, Cyprus, Albania and He has also opened for some of the international artists such as 50 Cent, Flo Rida, Stromae, The Asteroids Galaxy Tour, Kiko Navarro, Kenny Carpenter, Bang La Decks and Rouls and Doors.

== Discography ==
=== Singles ===
Title	Year	Peak chart positions	Awards	Featuring Artist	Label
Title	Year	GRE	Awards	Featuring Artist	Label
Miss You (Son Of The Sun)	2011	-		Beat Les	Avril Productions
Fili (Beat-les Miami To Vegas Remix)	2011	-		Vegas	Warner Music
Mamacita Buena (System B & MV Mars Remix)	2012	-		Claydee	Ultra Music
Erotas	2014	-		Lefteris Pantazis, TUS	Heaven Music
You Make My Nights	2014	-		Roni Iron, Vicky Bania	Planetworks
Have You Ever (Beat-les Sunset Mix)	2014	-		Chris IDH, Chrysa T.	Zero10 Records
Kati Na Nioso	2014	-		Josephine	Panik Records
Rodino Oneiro (Bobito Official Remix)	2015	-		Demy	Panik Records
Zitima Zois Kai Thanatou (Bobito Official Remix)	2015	-		Barrice	Spicy Music
Epimeno (Bobito Official Remix)	2016	-		Barrice	Spicy Music
Agapi Mono	2016	-		Barrice	Spider Music
El Telephone	2022	1	Diamond	Eleni Foureira, Ayman	Panik Records
Sentoni	2022	-	Gold	Giorgos Livanis	Panik Records
El Telephone Remix	2022	1	Diamond	Eleni Foureira, Ayman, FY, Trannos, Mente Fuerte	Panik Records
Kiklos	2023			Giorgos Livanis	Panik Records

=== Songwriting ===
Title	Year	Music	Lyrics	Featuring Artist
Miss You (Son Of The Sun)	2011	Bobito, Vido, Elias Tzikas	Bobito, Vido, Elias Tzikas, Kristian Efremidis	Beat Les
Erotas	2014	Bobito, Vido, Barrice	Bobito, Vido, Barrice, Kaisaras, TUS	Lefteris Pantazis, TUS
Kati Na Nioso	2014	Bobito, Timo Groove, Barrice	Bobito, Vido, Barrice	Josephine
You Make My Nights	2014	Bobito, Vido	Bobito, Vido	Roni Iron, Vicky Bania
Oso Iparxeis	2015	Bobito, Vido	Bobito, Vido	Kyriakos Andreou
Agapi Mono	2016	Bobito, Barrice	Bobito, Barrice	Bobito, Barrice
Karma	2020	Bobito, Paco	Bobito, Paco	Angelita
Ti Koitane	2022	Bobito, Paco, Antonis Rigas	Bobito, Paco, Antonis Rigas	Dimitris Tatarakis
Methismeni	2022	Bobito, Paco, Antonis Rigas	Bobito, Paco, Antonis Rigas	Giannis Arvanitidis
Oristiko	2022	Bobito, Paco, Antonis Rigas	Bobito, Paco, Antonis Rigas	Vaggelis Kakouriotis
El Telephone	2022	Bobito, Paco, Antonis Rigas	Bobito, Paco, Antonis Rigas	Eleni Foureira, Bobito, Ayman
El Telephone Remix	2022	Bobito, Paco, Antonis Rigas	Bobito, Paco, Antonis Rigas	Eleni Foureira, Bobito, Ayman, FY, Trannos, Mente Fuerte
Sentoni	2022	Bobito, Paco, Antonis Rigas	Bobito, Paco, Antonis Rigas	Giorgos Livanis
Kiklos	2023	Bobito, Paco, Antonis Rigas	Bobito, Paco, Antonis Rigas	Giorgos Livanis, Bobito
Anatelo	2023	Bobito, Paco, Antonis Rigas	Bobito, Paco, Antonis Rigas	Tasos Xiarcho
Apothimena	2023	Bobito, Paco, Antonis Rigas	Bobito, Paco, Antonis Rigas	Giorgos Tsalikis, Charis Savva
Paramilas	2023	Bobito, Paco, Antonis Rigas	Bobito, Paco, Antonis Rigas	Angelita
Entasi	2023	Bobito, Paco, Antonis Rigas	Bobito, Paco, Antonis Rigas	Asimina
Pote	2023	Bobito, Paco, Antonis Rigas	Bobito, Paco, Antonis Rigas	Matina Zara
Xana	2024	Bobito, Paco, Antonis Rigas	Bobito, Paco, Antonis Rigas	Evangelia, Paco
Ego	2024	Bobito, Paco, Antonis Rigas	Bobito, Paco, Antonis Rigas	Anna Poltzoglou
Anapantexa	2024	Bobito, Paco, Antonis Rigas	Bobito, Paco, Antonis Rigas	Marianna Karra

=== Music Videos ===
Year	Song	Featuring Artist
2016	Agapi Mono	Barrice
2022	El Telephone Remix	Eleni Foureira, Ayman, FY, Trannos, Mente Fuerte
2023	Kiklos	Giorgos Livanis

=== Live performances ===
Title	Year	Event
Dj Bobito featuring Dionysia	2018	Colour Day Festival
Dj Bobito featuring Lila Trianti	2019	Colour Day Festival
Dj Bobito featuring Lila Trianti	2019	Dreamland Festival
El Telephone featuring Eleni Foureira	2022	MAD Video Music Awards
El Telephone featuring Eleni Foureira	2022	Amita Motion Day of Positive Energy
Dj Bobito featuring Konstantinos Argyros	2022	Colour Day Festival
Dj Bobito featuring 50 Cent x Konstantinos Argyros	2022	40 Years Ceremony of OAKA
Dj Bobito featuring Eleni Foureira	2023	Reborn Tour with Eleni Foureira
Dj Bobito featuring Eleni Foureira	2024	Eleni Foureira Tour
