= The Voice of Greece season 2 =

The Voice of Greece
- Season 2
- Hosted by: Giorgos Liagkas; Themis Georgantas
- Coaches: Michalis Kouinelis; Despina Vandi; Antonis Remos; Melina Aslanidou
- Winner: Kostas Ageris
- Winning coach: Antonis Remos
- Runner-up: Anna Vilanidi

Release
- Original network: ANT1
- Original release: February 15 – June 21, 2015

Season chronology
- ← Previous; Season 1 Next → Season 3

The second season of the Greek and Cypriot reality talent show The Voice of Greece premiered on February 15, 2015 on ANT1. Based on the reality singing competition The Voice of Holland, the series was created by Dutch television producer John de Mol. It is part of an international series.

On July 16, 2014, it was confirmed that both the presenters and the coaches of the previous season would return. The winner receives a record deal with Minos EMI and a Peugeot 108 as part of his prizes.

== Teams ==
Each coach of the season had, after the blind auditions, sixteen acts in his team. During the battles each coach lost half of his acts. During the live shows, the coaches were losing two (first and second live) or one act (third to fifth live) until the final live where each coach had one act.

Color key

- Winner
- Runner-up
- Third place
- Fourth place
- Eliminated in the Live shows
- Eliminated in the Battles
- Artist was stolen by another coach in the Battle rounds (Name is struck-through)
- Artist withdrew

Coaches	Top 64 artists			
Michalis Kouinelis				
Michalis Kouinelis	Katerina Kabanelli	Akis Panagiotidis	Eva Tsachra	Elena Papapanagiotou
Michalis Kouinelis	Polykseni Lykoudi	Andromachi Dimitropoulou	Petros Panagoulis	Andreas Moyseos
Michalis Kouinelis	Andreas Fox	Giorgos Dimitropoulos	~~Charianna Meremeti~~	~~Mario Likafi~~
Michalis Kouinelis	Marianna Agnidi	Eleni Theodorou	Michalis Gargalis	Georgia Giasemi
Michalis Kouinelis	Ilana Kollitsi	Alexandros Lazaridis		
Despina Vandi				
Despina Vandi	Anna Vilanidi	Stavros Chaliabalias	Panagiota Kapsali	Dimitris Liolios
Despina Vandi	Babis Nikolatos	Andromachi Koktsidi	Oleg Dergatsiov	Mario Likafi
Despina Vandi	Angel Karatsami	Emily Makis	~~Patricia Abrahams~~	Nefeli Tsikrika
Despina Vandi	Eleni Michail	Evaggelos Zoulas	Katerina Bourneli	Michalis Georgadakis
Despina Vandi	Apostolos Melis	Dionisis Kostis		
Antonis Remos				
Antonis Remos	Kostas Ageris	Konstantinos Aggelopoulos	Makis Drakos	Stelios Karipidis
Antonis Remos	Alexis Prevenas	Callia Gelagoti	Maria Ioannidou	Stavros Pilichos
Antonis Remos	Tasos Vermis	Ilektra Barakos	~~Babis Nikolatos~~	Anna Capone Papas
Antonis Remos	Antonis Oikonomou	Ilona Kreimers	Antonis Rigas	Irida Zorba
Antonis Remos	Vaggelis Kakoulakis	Antonis Siganos		
Melina Aslanidou				
Melina Aslanidou	Nektarios Mallas	Andreas Elesnitsalis	Alexandros Barboutis	Despina Zacharitsef
Melina Aslanidou	Katerina Eugenikou	Kyriaki Pantelidou	Patricia Abrahams	Dafni Tsoulia
Melina Aslanidou	Anastasia Kakagianni	Charianna Meremeti	~~Maria Ioannidou~~	~~Elena Papapanagiotou~~
Melina Aslanidou	~~Andreas Moyseos~~	~~Ilektra Barakos~~	Andy Mark	Thanasis Papanikolaou
Melina Aslanidou	Natasa Karakatsani	Aggela Geraskli		

== Blind auditions ==
The blind auditions took place in the Kapa Studios in Spata, Attica. Each coach had the length of the artists' performance to decide if they wanted that artist on their team. If two or more coaches have wanted the same artist, then the artist chose their coach. If only one wanted the artist, then the artist was defaulted in his team. Once the coaches picked their team, they pitted them against each other in the Battles.

Color key

✔	Coach hit his/her "ΣΕ ΘΕΛΩ" button
	Artist defaulted to this coach's team
	Artist elected to join this coach's team
	Artist eliminated with no coach pressing his or her "ΣΕ ΘΕΛΩ" button

=== Episode 1 (February 15) ===
The first blind audition episode was broadcast on February 15, 2015.

Order	Artist	Age	Hometown	Song	Coach's and contestant's choices			
Order	Artist	Age	Hometown	Song	Michalis	Despina	Antonis	Melina
1	Dafni Tsoulia	17	Athens, Attica	"Kripsou"	✔	—	✔	✔
2	Stelios Karipidis	23	Thessaloniki, Macedonia	"Best of You"	✔	✔	✔	✔
3	Eva Tsachra	26	Athens, Attica	"Always on the Run"	✔	✔	✔	✔
4	Giannis Konitopoulos	25	Athens, Attica	"Thelo na me nioseis"	—	—	—	—
5	Stavros Chaliabalias	22	Orestiada, Thrace	"Monachogios o Konstantis"	✔	✔	✔	✔
6	Akis Panagiotidis	30	Montreal, Canada	"Skyfall"	✔	✔	✔	✔
7	Agapi Itogia	18	Thessaloniki, Macedonia	"Odi ston Karaiskaki"	—	—	—	—
8	Marianna Agnidi	16	Athens, Attica	"Dernière danse"	✔	—	—	✔
9	Antonis Rigas	23	Athens, Attica	"Den exo polla"	—	—	✔	—
10	Evita Agaitsi	20	Thessaloniki, Macedonia	"Read All About It"	—	—	—	—
11	Nektarios Mallas	43	Thessaloniki, Macedonia	"Tha thela na isouna edo"	—	✔	—	✔

=== Episode 2 (February 22) ===
The second blind audition episode was broadcast on February 22, 2015.

Order	Artist	Age	Hometown	Song	Coach's and contestant's choices			
Order	Artist	Age	Hometown	Song	Michalis	Despina	Antonis	Melina
1	Andromachi Koktsidi	24	Volos, Thessaly	"I Epimoni Sou"	✔	✔	✔	✔
2	Alexandros Barboutis	23	Athens, Attica	"Oi Melisses"	✔	—	✔	✔
3	Eleni Theodorou	23	Athens, Attica	"Lonely Boy"	✔	✔	✔	✔
4	Elena Papapanagiotou	19	Larnaca, Cyprus	"Methismeni Politeia"	✔	✔	—	✔
5	Erasmia Manou	30	Athens, Attica	"I Agapi Argei"	—	—	—	—
6	Patricia Abrahams	41	Athens, Attica	"Crazy"	✔	✔	✔	✔
7	Petros Panagoulis	30	Athens, Attica	"I Nyxta Murizei Giasemi"	✔	—	—	—
8	Elena Domazou	24	Athens, Attica	"Den Thelo Allo Iroa Pia"	—	—	—	—
9	Kostas Ageris	25	Athens, Attica	"Tin patrida exasa"	✔	✔	✔	✔
10	Michalis Georgadakis	23	Athens, Attica	"Dear Darlin'"	—	✔	—	—
11	Alexis Dermitzakis	30	Athens, Attica	"Akoma Mia"	—	—	—	—
12	Anna Capone Papas	26	Athens, Attica	"Kookoobadi"	—	—	✔	—

=== Episode 3 (March 1) ===
The third blind audition episode was broadcast on March 1, 2015.

Order	Artist	Age	Hometown	Song	Coach's and contestant's choices			
Order	Artist	Age	Hometown	Song	Michalis	Despina	Antonis	Melina
1	Charianna Meremeti	25	Athens, Attica	"Smells Like Teen Spirit"	✔	—	✔	✔
2	Andreas Elesnitsalis	19	Nicosia, Cyprus	"O Amlet Tis Selinis"	—	—	—	✔
3	Anna Vilanidi	21	Nicosia, Cyprus	"Clown"	✔	✔	✔	✔
4	Callia Gelagoti	26	Sydney, Australia	"Tha 'rtho na se do"	—	—	✔	—
5	Konstantinos Boptsis	25	Edessa, Central Macedonia	"Mia nixta kolasi"	—	—	—	—
6	Christos Santikai	20	Athens, Attica	"Ena gramma"	—	—	—	—
7	Katerina Kabanelli	19	Lemesos, Cyprus	"Triantafilleni"	✔	✔	✔	✔
8	Paris Christofi	16	Nicosia, Cyprus	"Another Love"	—	—	—	—
9	Evaggelos Zoulas	40	Athens, Attica	"To patoma"	✔	✔	✔	✔
10	Alexis Prevenas	29	Lavrio, Attica	"Espase I Nixta (I Nihta Dio Kommatia)"	—	—	✔	—
11	Thaleia Oikonomou	26	Athens, Attica	"Lampo"	—	—	—	—
12	Andy Mark	47	Athens, Attica	"Have You Ever Seen the Rain?"	—	—	—	✔

=== Episode 4 (March 8) ===
The fourth blind audition episode was broadcast on March 8, 2015.

Order	Artist	Age	Hometown	Song	Coach's and contestant's choices			
Order	Artist	Age	Hometown	Song	Michalis	Despina	Antonis	Melina
1	Despina Zacharitsef	20	Athens, Attica	"Impossible"	✔	✔	✔	✔
2	Giannis Gounaropoulos	28	Amarynthos, Euboea	"Paliokairos"	—	—	—	—
3	Alexandros Lazaridis	27	Athens, Attica	"Tutti Frutti"	✔	✔	✔	✔
4	Eleni Chadiari	19	Monemvasia, Peloponnese	All of me"	—	—	—	—
5	Oleg Dergatsiov	22	Eleusis, Attica	"Alcoholic"	✔	✔	✔	✔
6	Stavros Pilichos	24	Aliveri, Euboea	"En Lefko"	—	—	✔	—
7	Panagiota Kapsali	23	Athens, Attica	"I Will Always Love You"	✔	✔	✔	✔
8	Nefeli Tsikrika	16	Agrinio, Aetolia-Acarnania	"Den mas sinxoro"	—	✔	—	—
9	Vaggelis Kakoulakis	32	Athens, Attica	"O ilios vasileuei"	—	✔	✔	—
10	Aimilios Mosaidis	22	Kilkis, Macedonia	"Emeina Edo"	—	—	—	—
11	Ilana Kollitsi	26	Nicosia, Cyprus	Someone like You"	✔	—	—	—
12	Aggela Geraskli	33	Athens, Attica	"I Bossa Nova tou Isaia"	—	—	—	✔

=== Episode 5 (March 15) ===
The fifth blind audition episode was broadcast on March 15, 2015.

Order	Artist	Age	Hometown	Song	Coach's and contestant's choices			
Order	Artist	Age	Hometown	Song	Michalis	Despina	Antonis	Melina
1	Katerina Bourneli	28	Athens, Attica	"Kalimera"	✔	✔	—	—
2	Stavros Papastavrou	28	Athens, Attica	"Vrexei fotia sti strata mou"	—	—	—	—
3	Giorgos Dimitropoulos	27	Athens, Attica	"Ki emeina edo"	✔	✔	✔	✔
4	Ilektra Barakos	31	Los Angeles, United States	"So What"	—	—	—	✔
5	Io Nikolaou	—	Athens, Attica	"What a Feeling"	—	—	—	—
6	Makis Drakos	26	Karpenisi, Evrytania	"Sorry Seems to Be the Hardest Word"	✔	✔	✔	✔
7	Irida Zorba	24	Athens, Attica	"Sing It Back"	—	—	✔	—
8	Antonis Siganos	32	Rhodes, South Aegean	"Mi fygeis tora"	✔	✔	✔	✔
9	Katerina Eugenikou	20	Athens, Attica	"Ti Sou'kana kai Pineis"	✔	✔	—	✔
10	Persefoni Milia	23	Thessaloniki, Macedonia	"Xilies Vradies"	—	—	—	—
11	Maria Corelli	24	Heraklion, Crete	"Girna me sto xthes"	—	—	—	—
12	Dimitris Liolios	32	Athens, Attica	"Dyo Psemmata"	—	✔	✔	✔

=== Episode 6 (March 22) ===
The sixth blind audition episode was broadcast on March 22, 2015.

Order	Artist	Age	Hometown	Song	Coach's and contestant's choices			
Order	Artist	Age	Hometown	Song	Michalis	Despina	Antonis	Melina
1	Anastasia Kakagianni	24	Toronto, Canada	"Let It Go"	—	—	—	✔
2	Nikolas Savvidis	20	Nicosia, Cyprus	"Dimosthenous Lekseis"	—	—	—	—
3	Babis Nikolatos	32	Athens, Attica	"Are You Gonna Be My Girl"	✔	✔	✔	✔
4	Angel Karatsami	31	Dubai, United Arab Emirates	"Run"	—	✔	—	—
5	Anny Ksantinidou	26	Athens, Attica	"Oso o Kosmos Tha Exei Esena"	—	—	—	—
6	Polykseni Lykoudi	16	Patras, Achaea	"Happy"	✔	✔	✔	✔
7	Persefoni Farmaki	21	Loutraki, Corinthia	"Wasting My Young Years"	—	—	—	—
8	Apostolos Melis	36	Athens, Attica	"Thelo Na Se Do"	—	✔	—	—
9	Ilona Kreimers	30	Glyfada, Attica	"Against All Odds"	—	—	✔	—
10	Andreas Moyseos	20	Larnaca, Cyprus	"Antikrista"	—	✔	—	✔
11	Panos Smyrnaios	27	Kamatero, Attica	"Vges sto Balkoni na Deis"	—	—	—	—
12	Maria Ioannidou	33	Athens, Attica	"Tetarti Vrady"	—	✔	—	✔

=== Episode 7 (March 29) ===
The seventh blind audition episode was broadcast on March 27, 2015.

Order	Artist	Age	Hometown	Song	Coach's and contestant's choices			
Order	Artist	Age	Hometown	Song	Michalis	Despina	Antonis	Melina
1	Eleni Michail	17	Lemesos, Cyprus	"Read All About It"	—	✔	—	—
2	Giorgos Lazarou	20	Thessaloniki, Macedonia	"Den Exo Hrono"	—	—	—	—
3	Michalis Gargalis	21	Athens, Attica	"Here Without You"	✔	✔	—	✔
4	Natasa Karakatsani	29	Rhodes, South Aegean	"Zo"	—	—	—	✔
5	Anny Fassea	21	Athens, Attica	"The Blower's Daughter"	—	—	—	—
6	Andreas Fox	26	London, United Kingdom	"All of me"	✔	✔	✔	✔
7	Matina Pantzali	24	Aliveri, Euboea	"Kryfto"	—	—	—	—
8	Dionisis Kostis	—	Rafina, Attica	"The Second You Sleep"	—	✔	—	—
9	Tasos Vermis	20	Karditsa, Thessaly	"Eksaitias Sou"	—	✔	✔	✔
10	Antonis Oikonomou	26	Paralimni, Cyprus	"Kalitero Psema"	—	—	✔	—
11	Rafaela Chatzi	23	Athens, Attica	"Russian Roulette"	—	—	—	—
12	Georgia Giasemi	32	Athens, Attica	"An Einai i Agapi Amartia"	✔	—	—	—

=== Episode 8 (April 5) ===
The eighth blind audition episode was broadcast on April 5, 2015.

Order	Artist	Age	Hometown	Song	Coach's and contestant's choices			
Order	Artist	Age	Hometown	Song	Michalis	Despina	Antonis	Melina
1	Maria Anagnostou	19	Athens, Attica	"Istoria mou"	—	—	—	—
2	Stylianos Stylianou	22	Nicosia, Cyprus	"Kardies Apo Asteria"	—	—	—	—
3	Thanasis Papanikolaou	25	Thessaloniki, Macedonia	"Mikri Patrida"	—	✔	✔	✔
4	Eutyxia Mauropoulou	22	Athens, Attica	"Counting Stars"	—	—	—	—
5	Mario Likafi	22	Paros, South Aegean	"One Day / Reckoning Song"	✔	✔	✔	✔
6	Marios Arratos	22	Serres, Macedonia	"Eimai Dikos Sou"	—	—	—	—
7	Emily Makis	16	Nottingham, United Kingdom	"When I Was Your Man"	✔	✔	—	✔
8	Andromachi Dimitropoulou	20	Athens, Attica	"Alla Mou Len Ta Matia Sou"	✔	N/A	—	—
9	Konstantinos Aggelopoulos	16	Athens, Attica	"Ki Emeina Edo"	N/A	N/A	✔	✔
10	Kyriaki Pantelidou	16	Nicosia, Cyprus	"People Help the People"	N/A	N/A	N/A	✔

== The Battles ==
The Battles take place in the Kapa Studios in Spata, Attica. Two artists from each team compete against by singing the same song. The coach of the two acts decides which one will go through and which one will be eliminated meaning that eight acts from each team will get through the live shows. The battle advisors for these episodes are: Christos Dantis working with Antonis Remos, Giannis Vardis working with Despina Vandi, Giorgos Papadopoulos working with Melina Aslanidou and Giannis Giokarinis working with Michalis Kouinelis.

The Battles episodes started airing on Sunday April 12, 2014 and will end on SundayMay 3, 2014 after four episodes with eight battles taking place in each one.

Color key

✔	Coach hit his/her "ΣΕ ΘΕΛΩ(Steal)" button
✔	Artist won the Battle
	Artist lost the Battle but was stolen by another coach
	Artist lost the Battle and was eliminated

=== Episode 1 (April 12) ===
The first battle round episode was broadcast on April 12, 2015.

Order	Coach	Artists		Song	Coaches' and artists' choices			
Order	Coach	Artists		Song	Michalis	Despina	Antonis	Melina
1	Antonis Remos	Alexis Prevenas	Antonis Siganos	"Oli i Zoi Mou"	—	—	—N/a	—
2	Despina Vandi	Dionisis Kostis	Oleg Dergatsiov	"Play That Funky Music"	—	—N/a	—	—
3	Melina Aslanidou	Katerina Eugenikou	Aggela Geraskli	"Pefteis Se Lathi"	—	—	—	—N/a
4	Michalis Kouinelis	Andreas Fox	Mario Likafi	"Take Me to Church"	—N/a	✔	—	—
5	Antonis Remos	Kostas Ageris	Vaggelis Kakoulakis	"Oso Varoun ta Sidera"	—	—	—N/a	—
6	Despina Vandi	Patricia Abrahams	Angel Karatsami	"Think"	—	—N/a	—	✔
7	Michalis Kouinelis	Eva Tsachra	Alexandros Lazaridis	"I Feel Good"	—N/a	—	—	—
8	Melina Aslanidou	Despina Zacharitsef	Natasa Karakatsani	"Oneiro Itane"	—	—	—	—N/a

=== Episode 2 (April 19) ===
The second battle round episode was broadcast on April 19, 2015.

Order	Coach	Artists		Song	Coaches' and artists' choices			
Order	Coach	Artists		Song	Michalis	Despina	Antonis	Melina
1	Melina Aslanidou	Ilektra Barakos	Anastasia Kakagianni	"Fame"	—	—	✔	—N/a
2	Despina Vandi	Apostolos Melis	Dimitris Liolios	"Anapantita"	—	—N/a	—	—
3	Antonis Remos	Babis Nikolatos	Stelios Karipidis	"Rock and Roll Queen"	✔	✔	—N/a	✔
4	Melina Aslanidou	Alexandros Barboutis	Thanasis Papanikolaou	"Gia Na Se Sinantiso"	—	—N/a	—	—N/a
5	Michalis Kouinelis	Katerina Kabanelli	Ilana Kollitsi	"True Colors"	—N/a	—N/a	—	—
6	Antonis Remos	Stavros Pilichos	Irida Zorba	"Stous Pente Anemous"	—	—N/a	—N/a	—
7	Michalis Kouinelis	Charianna Meremeti	Akis Panagiotidis	"Bang Bang"	—N/a	—N/a	—	✔
8	Despina Vandi	Michalis Georgadakis	Emily Makis	"She Will Be Loved"	—	—N/a	—	—N/a

=== Episode 3 (April 26) ===
The third battle round episode was broadcast on April 26, 2015.

Order	Coach	Artists		Song	Coaches' and artists' choices			
Order	Coach	Artists		Song	Michalis	Despina	Antonis	Melina
1	Michalis Kouinelis	Petros Panagoulis	Georgia Giasemi	"Afou to Thes"	—N/a	—N/a	—	—N/a
2	Melina Aslanidou	Dafni Tsoulia	Andreas Moyseos	"Vrochi Mou"	✔	—N/a	—	—N/a
3	Michalis Kouinelis	Giorgos Dimitropoulos	Michalis Gargalis	"Epapses Agapi Na Thimizeis"	—N/a	—N/a	—	—N/a
4	Antonis Remos	Tasos Vermis	Antonis Rigas	"Pote Ksana"	—	—N/a	—N/a	—N/a
5	Despina Vandi	Katerina Bourneli	Panagiota Kapsali	"Love the Way You Lie"	—	—N/a	—	—N/a
6	Antonis Remos	Callia Gelagoti	Ilona Kreimers	"Because of You"	—	—N/a	—N/a	—N/a
7	Melina Aslanidou	Andreas Elesnitsalis	Elena Papapanagiotou	"Koita Ego"	✔	—N/a	—	—N/a
8	Michalis Kouinelis	Eleni Theodorou	Polykseni Lykoudi	"Walking on Sunshine"	—N/a	—N/a	—	—N/a

=== Episode 4 (May 3) ===
The fourth battle round episode was broadcast on May 3, 2015.

Order	Coach	Artists		Song	Coaches' and artists' choices			
Order	Coach	Artists		Song	Michalis	Despina	Antonis	Melina
1	Michalis Kouinelis	Andromachi Dimitropoulou	Marianna Agnidi	"Misirlou"	—N/a	—N/a	—	—N/a
2	Melina Aslanidou	Nektarios Mallas	Maria Ioannidou	"Tha Proxorame Mazi" / "Rock Mpalanta"	—N/a	—N/a	✔	—N/a
3	Despina Vandi	Stavros Chaliabalias	Evaggelos Zoulas	"Sto 'Pa kai Sto Ksanaleo "	—N/a	—N/a	—N/a	—N/a
4	Antonis Remos	Antonis Oikonomou	Konstantinos Aggelopoulos	"Ta Karavia mou Kaio"	—N/a	—N/a	—N/a	—N/a
5	Despina Vandi	Anna Vilanidi	Eleni Michail	"If I Were a Boy"	—N/a	—N/a	—N/a	—N/a
6	Melina Aslanidou	Kyriaki Pantelidou	Andy Mark	"Need You Now"	—N/a	—N/a	—N/a	—N/a
7	Despina Vandi	Andromachi Koktsidi	Nefeli Tsikrika	"Ego Milao gia Dynami"	—N/a	—N/a	—N/a	—N/a
8	Antonis Remos	Makis Drakos	Anna Capone Papas	"Use Somebody"	—N/a	—N/a	—N/a	—N/a

== Live shows ==
=== Results summary ===
Color key
Artist's info

- Artist from Team Stavento
- Artist from Team Vandi
- Artist from Team Remos
- Artist from Team Aslanidou

Result details

- Artist was proclaimed as the winner
- Artist was saved by the public
- Artist was saved by his/her coach
- Artist was eliminated
- Artist received the highest accumulated total points and was saved
- Artist received the fewest accumulated total points and was eliminated
- Artist received the fewest of the public's vote and was eliminated
- Artist did not perform on that particular week

Artist	Week 1	Week 2	Week 3	Week 4	Week 5	Week 6	
Artist	Week 1	Week 2	Week 3	Week 4	Week 5	Round 1	Round 2
Kostas Ageris		Safe	Safe	Safe	Safe	Safe	Winner
Anna Vilanidi		Bottom four	Safe	Safe	Safe	Safe	Runner-up
Nektarios Mallas	Safe		Safe	Safe	Safe	Safe	Third place
Katerina Kabanelli	Bottom four		Safe	Safe	Safe	Fourth place	Eliminated (Week 6)
Andreas Elesnitsalis	Bottom four		Safe	Bottom two	Eliminated	Eliminated (Week 5)	
Konstantinos Aggelopoulos	Safe		Safe	Bottom two	Eliminated	Eliminated (Week 5)	
Stavros Chaliabalias	Safe		Bottom two	Bottom two	Eliminated	Eliminated (Week 5)	
Akis Panagiotidis		Safe	Bottom two	Bottom two	Eliminated	Eliminated (Week 5)	
Makis Drakos		Bottom four	Bottom two	Bottom two	Eliminated (Week 4)		
Eva Tsachra		Bottom four	Safe	Bottom two	Eliminated (Week 4)		
Alexandros Barboutis		Safe	Bottom two	Bottom two	Eliminated (Week 4)		
Panagiota Kapsali		Safe	Safe	Bottom two	Eliminated (Week 4)		
Dimitris Liolios	Bottom three		Bottom two	Eliminated (Week 3)			
Despina Zacharitsef		Bottom four	Bottom two	Eliminated (Week 3)			
Elena Papapanagiotou	Safe		Bottom two	Eliminated (Week 3)			
Stelios Karipidis	Bottom four		Bottom two	Eliminated (Week 3)			
Patricia Abrahams		Bottom four	Eliminated (Week 2)				
Kyriaki Pantelidou		Bottom four	Eliminated (Week 2)				
Katerina Eugenikou		Bottom four	Eliminated (Week 2)				
Petros Panagoulis		Bottom four	Eliminated (Week 2)				
Andromachi Dimitropoulou		Bottom four	Eliminated (Week 2)				
Polykseni Lykoudi		Bottom four	Eliminated (Week 2)				
Oleg Dergatsiov		Bottom four	Eliminated (Week 2)				
Andromachi Koktsidi		Bottom four	Eliminated (Week 2)				
Babis Nikolatos		Bottom four	Eliminated (Week 2)				
Maria Ioannidou		Bottom four	Eliminated (Week 2)				
Callia Gelagoti		Bottom four	Eliminated (Week 2)				
Alexis Prevenas		Bottom four	Eliminated (Week 2)				
Dafni Tsoulia	Bottom four	Eliminated (Week 1)					
Anastasia Kakagianni	Bottom four	Eliminated (Week 1)					
Charianna Meremeti	Bottom four	Eliminated (Week 1)					
Andreas Moyseos	Bottom four	Eliminated (Week 1)					
Andreas Fox	Bottom four	Eliminated (Week 1)					
Giorgos Dimitropoulos	Bottom four	Eliminated (Week 1)					
Mario Likafi	Bottom three	Eliminated (Week 1)					
Angel Karatsami	Bottom three	Eliminated (Week 1)					
Stavros Pilichos	Bottom four	Eliminated (Week 1)					
Tasos Vermis	Bottom four	Eliminated (Week 1)					
Ilektra Barakos	Bottom four	Eliminated (Week 1)					

=== Live show details ===
The live shows took place in the Kapa Studios in Spata, Attica. Each coach has eight acts; during the first live show four from each team performed but only two of them advanced to the third live show. The same process goes on to the second with sixteen acts from both lives making it to the third live show. From the third live and on, each coach loses one act until each coach has one act in the final live.

Color key

Artist was saved by the public's vote
Artist was part of the bottom two in his/her team and saved by his/her coach
Artist was saved after receiving the highest accumulated coach's and public's points
Artist was eliminated
Artist received the most public votes

==== Week 1 (May 17) ====
The first live show aired on May 17, 2015 – with five acts from each team performing except Team Vandi which had four because a contestant withdrew. Two acts per team were saved, one by the public and one from his/her coach.

- Group performance: The Voice of Greece coaches – "Anatreptika""

Order	Coach	Artist	Song	Result
1	Antonis Remos	Stelios Karipidis	"Dangerous"	Remos' choice
2	Antonis Remos	Konstantinos Aggelopoulos	"Deikse mou ton Tropo"	Public's choice
3	Antonis Remos	Ilektra Barakos	"Bring Me to Life"	Eliminated
4	Antonis Remos	Tasos Vermis	"Kaigomai kai Sigoliono"	Eliminated
5	Antonis Remos	Stavros Pilichos	"Duo Palta"	Eliminated
6	Despina Vandi	Angel Karatsami	"Addiced to You"	Eliminated
7	Despina Vandi	Stavros Chaliabalias	"Paraponemena Logia"	Public's choice
8	Despina Vandi	Mario Likafi	"How to Save a Life"	Eliminated
9	Despina Vandi	Dimitris Liolios	"Mia Nixta Zoriki"	Vandi's choice
10	Michalis Kouinelis	Katerina Kabanelli	"Angel"	Kouinelis' choice
11	Michalis Kouinelis	Giorgos Dimitropoulos	"Mi M'aggizeis"	Eliminated
12	Michalis Kouinelis	Andreas Fox	"Beggin'"	Eliminated
13	Michalis Kouinelis	Elena Papapanagiotou	"An Isoula Agapi"	Public's choice
14	Michalis Kouinelis	Andreas Moyseos	"Me Pnigei Touti i Siopi"	Eliminated
15	Melina Aslanidou	Andreas Elesnitsalis	"O Palios Stratiotis"	Aslanidou's choice
16	Melina Aslanidou	Charianna Meremeti	"Like the Way I Do"	Eliminated
17	Melina Aslanidou	Nektarios Mallas	"Makria Mou Na Figeis"	Public's choice
18	Melina Aslanidou	Anastasia Kakagianni	"Holding Out for a Hero"	Eliminated
19	Melina Aslanidou	Dafni Tsoulia	"Kai Tha Xatho"	Eliminated

==== Week 2 (May 24) ====
The second live show aired on May 25, 2015 – with five acts from each team performing. Two acts per team were saved, one by the public and one from his/her coach.

Order	Coach	Artist	Song	Result
1	Melina Aslanidou	Patricia Abrahams	"Get the Party Started"	Eliminated
2	Melina Aslanidou	Alexandros Barboutis	"Ti Na Thimitho"	Public's choice
3	Melina Aslanidou	Kyriaki Pantelidou	"Jungle"	Eliminated
4	Melina Aslanidou	Despina Zacharitsef	"To Dikio Mou"	Aslanidou's choice
5	Melina Aslanidou	Katerina Asevi	"Argosvineis Moni"	Eliminated
6	Michalis Kouinelis	Petros Panagoulis	"Me To Stoma Gemato Filia"	Eliminated
7	Michalis Kouinelis	Akis Panagiotidis	"Wicked Game"	Public's choice
8	Michalis Kouinelis	Eva Tsachra	"Freedom! '90"	Kouinelis' choice
9	Michalis Kouinelis	Andromachi Dimitropoulou	"Na M'agapas"	Eliminated
10	Michalis Kouinelis	Polykseni Lykoudi	"Tha Xatho"	Eliminated
11	Despina Vandi	Oleg Dergatsiov	"Two Princes"	Eliminated
12	Despina Vandi	Anna Vilanidi	"My Kind of Love"	Vandi's choice
13	Despina Vandi	Andromachi Kotsidi	"Akrogialies Deilina"	Eliminated
14	Despina Vandi	Babis Nikolatos	"My Sharona"	Eliminated
15	Despina Vandi	Panagiota Kapsalali	"Take My Breath Away"	Public's choice
16	Antonis Remos	Kostas Ageris	"Gia Pou To'vales Kardia mou"	Public's choice
17	Antonis Remos	Maria Ioannidi	"Tora Kai Ego Tha Ziso"	Eliminated
18	Antonis Remos	Makis Drakos	"Stay with Me"	Remos' choice
19	Antonis Remos	Callia Gelagoti	"Tis Dyskoles Stigmes"	Eliminated
20	Antonis Remos	Alexis Prevenas	"De Tha me Ksexaseis"	Eliminated

==== Week 3 (May 31) ====
The live show aired on May 31, 2015 – with four acts from each team performing. Three acts per team were saved, two by the public and one from his/her coach.

Order	Coach	Artist	Song	Result
1	Antonis Remos	Stelios Karipidis	"Centuries"	Eliminated
2	Antonis Remos	Kostas Ageris	"An Eisai Ena Asteri"	Public's choice
3	Antonis Remos	Konstantinos Aggelopoulos	"M'aresei Na Mi Leo Polla"	Public's choice
4	Antonis Remos	Makis Drakos	"You're Beautiful"	Remos' choice
5	Michalis Kouinelis	Eva Tsachra	"Uptown Funk"	Public's choice
6	Michalis Kouinelis	Katerina Kabanelli	"Dance Me to the End of Love"	Public's choice
7	Michalis Kouinelis	Akis Panagiotidis	"Time Is Running Out"	Kouinelis' choice
8	Michalis Kouinelis	Elena Papapanagiotou	"Den Exei Sidera i Kardia Sou"	Eliminated
9	Melina Aslanidou	Andreas Elesnitsalis	"I Mpalanta tou Kyr-Mantiou"	Public's choice
10	Melina Aslanidou	Nektarios Mallas	"O Dikos Mou o Dromos"	Public's choice
11	Melina Aslanidou	Alexandros Barboutis	"Tou Erota"	Aslanidou's choice
12	Melina Aslanidou	Despina Zacharitsev	"O Lykos"	Eliminated
13	Despina Vandi	Anna Vilanidi	"Chandelier"	Public's choice
14	Despina Vandi	Stavros Chaliabalias	"Mana Mou Ellas"	Vandi's choice
15	Despina Vandi	Panagiota Kapsali	"Love Me like You Do"	Public's choice
16	Despina Vandi	Dimitris Lioliou	"Omologo"	Eliminated

==== Week 4 (June 7) ====
The live show aired on June 7, 2015 – with three acts from each team performing. Two acts per team were saved, one by the public and one from his/her coach.

- Group performances: Team Stavento ("Se'sena Kataligo"), Team Vandi ("Mavro Helidoni/Do sta Lianochortaroudia"), Team Remos ("Meine"), Team Aslanidou ("Ti Sou'kana kai Pineis")

Order	Coach	Artist	Song	Result
1	Despina Vandi	Stavros Chaliabalias	"Feggari Magia mou 'kanes"	Vandi's choice
2	Despina Vandi	Anna Vilanidi	"Can't Help Falling in Love"	Public's choice
3	Despina Vandi	Panagiota Kapsali	"California Dreamin'"	Eliminated
4	Melina Aslanidou	Andreas Elesnitsalis	"Oi Eleftheroi kai Oraioi"	Aslanidou's choice
5	Melina Aslanidou	Nektarios Mallas	"Etsi Ksafnika"	Public's choice
6	Melina Aslanidou	Alexandros Barboutis	"Ti Lathos Kano"	Eliminated
7	Michalis Kouinelis	Eva Tsachra	"Bang Bang"	Eliminated
8	Michalis Kouinelis	Katerina Kabanelli	"La Vie en rose"	Public's choice
9	Michalis Kouinelis	Akis Panagiotidis	"Crazy in Love"	Kouinelis' choice
10	Antonis Remos	Konstantinos Aggelopoulos	"Mia Synousia Mystiki"	Remos' choice
11	Antonis Remos	Kostas Ageris	"Ston Theo Eftago Tama"	Public's choice
12	Antonis Remos	Makis Drakos	"Total Eclipse of the Heart"	Eliminated

==== Week 5: Semi-final (June 14) ====
The live show aired on June 14, 2015 – with two acts from each team performing. One act per team was sent through the final by a mixed voting of the team's coach and public. Each artist performed two songs: a solo number and a duet with a guest. The four finalists performed a preview of their own songs after the results.

- Musical guests: Tamta ("Unloved"), Lakis Papadopoulos ("Koursaros"), Vegas ("Apopse"), Nikos Ziogalas ("Perase i Mpora"), Christos Dantis ("Ritores Kompinadoroi"), Stamatis Gonidis ("Apagoreuetai"), Eleni Tsaligopoulou ("Trava re Magka"), Giannis Vardis ("Pente Lepta")

Order	Coach	Artist	Solo song	Duet song	Duet with	Score			Result
Order	Coach	Artist	Solo song	Duet song	Duet with	Public	Coach	Total	Result
1	Michalis Kouinelis	Akis Panagiotidis	"Come Together" / "Lose Yourself"	"Purple Rain"	Tamta	46	52	98	Eliminated
2	Michalis Kouinelis	Katerina Kabanelli	"Another Love"	"Ta Isiha Vradia"	Lakis Papadopoulos	54	48	102	Safe
3	Despina Vandi	Anna Vilanidi	"All by Myself"	"Don't Stop the Music"	Melina Makri	46	55	101	Safe
4	Despina Vandi	Stavros Chaliabalias	"To Anestaki"	"Vasiliki"	Nikos Ziogalas	54	45	99	Eliminated
5	Antonis Remos	Konstantinos Aggelopoulos	"Mia Vradia sto Louki"	"O Babis o Flou"	Christos Dantis	40	40	80	Eliminated
6	Antonis Remos	Kostas Ageris	"Anathema Se"	"Ola S'agapane"	Stamatis Gonidis	60	60	120	Safe
7	Melina Aslanidou	Andreas Elesnitsalis	"Auti i Nihta Menei"	"Isouna Ksipoliti"	Eleni Tsaligopoulou	59	40	99	Eliminated
8	Melina Aslanidou	Nektarios Mallas	"Mikri Patrida"	"Pou Na Sou Eksigo"	Giannis Vardis	41	60	101	Safe

==== Week 6: Final (June 21) ====
The final live show aired on June 21, 2015 – with one artist from each team performing. Each artist performed three songs: a solo number, a duet with their coach and the song that was performed by the artist in the blind auditions.

- Group performance: The Voice of Greece previous contestants - "Counting Stars"

Order	Coach	Artist	First song	Second song (duet)	Third song	Result
1	Despina Vandi	Anna Vilanidi	"Poios Apo tous Dio"	"The Greatest Love of All"	"Clown"	Runner-up
2	Antonis Remos	Kostas Ageris	"Pos To'patha Afto"	"Ena Gramma"	"Tin patrida exasa"	Winner
3	Melina Aslanidou	Nektarios Mallas	"Zitas Polla"	"Den Milame"	"Tha thela na isouna edo"	Third place
4	Michalis Kouinelis	Katerina Kabanelli	"Na Krifto"	"Anadromika"	N/A (already eliminated)	Fourth place

== Performances by guests/coaches ==
Episode	Show segment	Performer(s)	Song(s)	Performance type	Source
13	The Live Shows, Part 1	The Voice of Greece coaches	"Anatreptika"	live performance	
15	The Live Shows, Part 3	Michalis Kouinelis (with Team Stavento)	"Aspro Pato"	live performance	
16	The Live Shows, Part 4	Melina Aslanidou	"Na Me Dikaiologiseis"	live performance	
16	The Live Shows, Part 4	Despina Vandi (with Team Vandi)	"Mavro Helidoni/Do Sta Lianohortaroudia"	live performance	
16	The Live Shows, Part 4	Melina Aslanidou (with Team Aslanidou)	"Ti Sou'kana kai Pineis"	live performance	
16	The Live Shows, Part 4	Michalis Kouinelis (with Team Stavento)	"Se'sena Kataligo"	live performance	
16	The Live Shows, Part 4	Antonis Remos (with Team Remos)	"Meine"	live performance	
17	The Live Shows, Part 5	Tamta	"Unloved"	live performance	—N/a
17	The Live Shows, Part 5	Lakis Papadopoulos	"Koursaros"	live performance	—N/a
17	The Live Shows, Part 5	Vegas	"Apopse"	live performance	—N/a
17	The Live Shows, Part 5	Nikos Ziogalas	"Perase i Mpora"	live performance	—N/a
17	The Live Shows, Part 5	Christos Dantis	"Ritores Kompinadoroi"	live performance	—N/a
17	The Live Shows, Part 5	Stamatis Gonidis	"Apagoreuetai"	live performance	—N/a
17	The Live Shows, Part 5	Eleni Tsaligopoulou	"Trava re Magka"	live performance	—N/a
17	The Live Shows, Part 5	Giannis Vardis	"Pente Lepta"	live performance	—N/a
17	The Live Shows, Part 5	Tamta (with Akis Panagiotidis)	"Purple Rain"	duet with contestant	
17	The Live Shows, Part 5	Lakis Papadopoulos (with Katerina Kabanelli)	"Ta Isiha Vradia"	duet with contestant	
17	The Live Shows, Part 5	Melina Makri (with Anna Vilanidi)	"Don't Stop the Music"	duet with contestant	
17	The Live Shows, Part 5	Nikos Ziogalas (with Stavros Chaliabalias)	"Vasiliki"	duet with contestant	
17	The Live Shows, Part 5	Christos Dantis (with Konstantinos Aggelopoulos)	"O Babis o Flou"	duet with contestant	
17	The Live Shows, Part 5	Stamatis Gonidis (with Kostas Ageris)	"Ola S'agapane"	duet with contestant	
17	The Live Shows, Part 5	Eleni Tsaligopoulou (with Andreas Elesnitsalis)	"Isouna Ksipoliti"	duet with contestant	
17	The Live Shows, Part 5	Giannis Vardis (with Nektarios Mallas)	"Pou Na Sou Eksigo"	duet with contestant	
18	The Live Shows, Part 6	Despina Vandi	"Ti Simasia Exei"	live performance	
18	The Live Shows, Part 6	Antonis Remos	"Lene"	live performance	
18	The Live Shows, Part 6	Panos Mouzourakis	"Stoxos"	live performance	
18	The Live Shows, Part 6	Areti Kosmidou (with Panos Mouzourakis)	"Ftanei"	live performance	
18	The Live Shows, Part 6	Maria Elena Kiriakou	"One Last Breath"	live performance	
18	The Live Shows, Part 6	Antonis Remos & Despina Vandi	"Medley"	live performance	

== Ratings ==
#	Episode	Date	Timeslot (EET)	Official ratings (in millions)	Rank		Share (Household)
#	Episode	Date	Timeslot (EET)	Official ratings (in millions)	Daily	Weekly	Share (Household)
1	"Blind Auditions, Part 1"	February 15, 2015	Sunday 9:15pm	1.971	1	2	41.0%
2	"Blind Auditions, Part 2"	February 22, 2015	Sunday 9:15pm	1.755	1	2	39.4%
3	"Blind Auditions, Part 3"	March 1, 2015	Sunday 9:15pm	2.017	1	1	42.5%
4	"Blind Auditions, Part 4"	March 8, 2015	Sunday 9:15pm	1.983	1	1	42.9%
5	"Blind Auditions, Part 5"	March 15, 2015	Sunday 9:15pm	2.146	1	2	44.9%
6	"Blind Auditions, Part 6"	March 22, 2015	Sunday 9:15pm	2.132	1	1	44.1%
7	"Blind Auditions, Part 7"	March 29, 2015	Sunday 9:15pm	1.709	1	2	35.7%
8	"Blind Auditions, Part 8"	April 5, 2015	Sunday 9:15pm	1.860	1	1	42.4%
9	"The Battles, Part 1"	April 12, 2015	Sunday 9:15pm	1.275	1	3	35.6%
10	"The Battles, Part 2"	April 19, 2015	Sunday 9:15pm	1.737	1	1	39.7%
11	"The Battles, Part 3"	April 26, 2015	Sunday 9:15pm	1.808	1	1	40.4%
12	"The Battles, Part 4"	May 3, 2015	Sunday 9:15pm	1.647	1	2	39.6%
13	"Live Shows, Part 1"	May 17, 2015	Sunday 9:15pm	1.207	2	9	33.3%
14	"Live Shows, Part 2"	May 24, 2015	Sunday 9:15pm	1.383	1	3	39.6%
15	"Live Shows, Part 3"	May 31, 2015	Sunday 9:15pm	1.204	1	7	37.6%
16	"Live Shows, Part 4"	June 7, 2015	Sunday 9:15pm	1.399	1	2	39.5%
17	"Live Shows, Part 5"	June 14, 2015	Sunday 9:15pm	1.341	1	2	42.3%
18	"Live Shows, Part 6"	June 21, 2015	Sunday 9:15pm	1.678	1	1	48.9%
