= Ela (Andromache song) =

2022 song by Andromache

Single by Andromache

from the album Ela – The Album
- Language: English; Greek
- Released: 9 March 2022
- Genre: Balkan pop
- Label: Panik
- Songwriters: Alex Papaconstantinou; Arash; Eyelar Mirzazadeh; Fatjon Miftaraj; Filloreta Raçi Fifi; Geraldo Sandell; Giorgos Papadopoulos; Robert Uhlmann; Viktor Svensson; Yll Limani

Music video
- "Ela" on YouTube

Eurovision Song Contest 2022 entry
- Country: Cyprus
- Artist: Andromache

Finals performance
- Semi-final result: 12th
- Semi-final points: 63

Entry chronology
- ◄ "El Diablo" (2021)
- "Break a Broken Heart" (2023) ►

"Ela" (Greek: Έλα; transl. "Come [on]") is a song recorded and released as a single by Greek singer Andromache. The song represented Cyprus in the Eurovision Song Contest 2022 in Turin, Italy after being internally selected by CyBC, the Cypriot national broadcaster for the Eurovision Song Contest.

== Background and composition ==
"Ela" was composed by a mix of Greek, Kosovo-Albanian, Dutch, Swedish and Spanish songwriters, namely Alex P, Arash, Eyelar Mirzazadeh, Fatjon Miftaraj, Filloreta Raci, Geraldo Sandell, Giorgos Papadopoulos, Robert Uhlmann, Viktor Svensson and Yll Limani. "Ela" was described as an "ethnic-pop" song with "modern European" production incorporating Balkan instrumentation, which includes Greek bouzouki and Albanian fyell brezi.

== Release ==
The song was first released on CyBC on Cypriot TV program Ola ston Aera on 9 March 2022. The music video for the song was released on 10 March 2022, while it was released on digital platforms on 11 March 2022.

== Eurovision Song Contest ==
=== Selection ===
In September 2021, CEO of Panik Records George Arsenakos claimed that the label had signed an agreement with CyBC to establish a national final in order to select the Cypriot entrant for 2023. In January 2022, it was announced an agreement between the two parties is already in place for the 2022 selection and that the performance of the chosen act will be staged by Marvin Dietmann and Dan Shipton, both having previous experience at Eurovision.

Andromachi Dimitropoulou, former contestant of The Voice of Greece, was rumoured to be the selected representative for Cyprus. The Cypriot radio programme Good Morning Show reported that the name of their national representative ended with -machi, and in addition to this, Dimitropoulou is signed with Panik Records. Dimitropoulou was officially announced as the Cypriot entrant with the song "Ela" on 9 March 2022 during the RIK 1 programme Ola ston Aera.

=== At Eurovision ===
According to Eurovision rules, all nations with the exceptions of the host country and the "Big Five" (France, Germany, Italy, Spain and the United Kingdom) are required to qualify from one of two semi-finals in order to compete for the final; the top ten countries from each semi-final progress to the final. The European Broadcasting Union (EBU) split up the competing countries into six different pots based on voting patterns from previous contests, with countries with favourable voting histories put into the same pot. On 25 January 2022, an allocation draw was held which placed each country into one of the two semi-finals, as well as which half of the show they would perform in. Cyprus was placed into the second semi-final, held on 12 May 2022, and performed in the first half of the show, 9th out of the 18 countries performing.

== Charts ==
Chart performance for "Ela"
Chart (2022)	Peak position
Greece Local (IFPI)	45
Lithuania (AGATA)	76
