= Peçi =

Peçi is an Albanian surname. Notable people with this name include:

- Aleksandër Peçi (born 1951), Albanian composer
- Eno Peçi (born 19??), Albanian male ballet dancer
- Ermal Peçi (born 1988), Albanian television host
- Faton Peci (born 1982), Kosovar politician and current minister of Agriculture
- Majkel Peçi (born 1996), Albanian footballer
- Sotir Peçi (1873–1932), Albanian politician, educator and mathematician
- Tërmet Peçi (born 1972), Member of Albanian Parliament, former Mayor of Tepelena
- Xhevdet Peci (1955–2022), Kosovan and formerly Yugoslav heavyweight boxer and coach
