= Andromache (singer) =

Greek singer

Andromache Ανδρομάχη
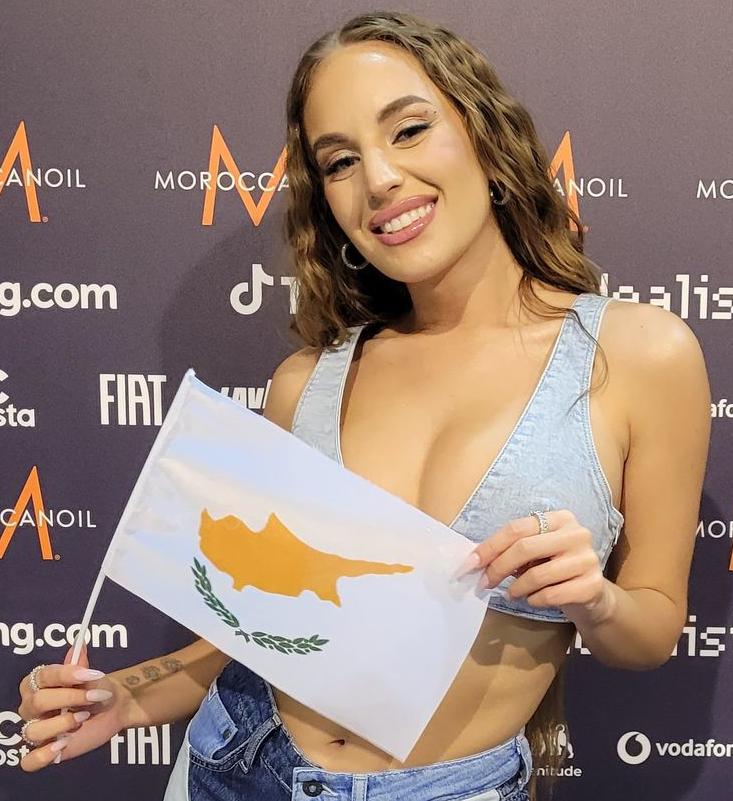
- Andromache in 2022

Background information
- Also known as: Andromachi
- Born: Andromache Dimitropoulou; 12 October 1994 (age 31); Siegen, Germany
- Origin: Pyrgos, Elis, Greece
- Genres: Laïko; Dance pop Pop folk
- Years active: 2015–present
- Label: Panik

Andromache Dimitropoulou (Greek: Ανδρομάχη Δημητροπούλου, IPA: [anðroˈmaçi ðimitroˈpulu]; born 12 October 1994), known professionally as Andromache and sometimes Andromachi, is a Greek singer who represented Cyprus in the Eurovision Song Contest 2022 with the song "Ela".

== Career ==
Andromache was born to Greek parents in Siegen, Germany where she lived before moving to Greece at the age of 10. While studying German philology in Athens, she started singing in music scenes at Lechaina, Elis and Gazi, Athens.

In 2015, she participated in the second season of The Voice of Greece, where she was eliminated at the second live show.

The Voice of Greece Performances
	Song	Original Artist(s)	Notes
Blind Audition	"Alla Mou Len Ta Matia Sou" (Άλλα μου λεν τα μάτια σου)	Poli Panou	One-chair turn, joins Team Michalis
Battle	"Misirlou"	Dick Dale	Won against Marianna Agnidi
Live Shows	"Na M'agapas" (Να Μ' Αγαπάς)	Eleni Tsaligopolou	Eliminated

In 2017, she released her first single, titled "To feggari" (Το φεγγάρι; "The Moon"), written by Giorgos Papadopoulos. On 9 March, it was announced that she would represent Cyprus in the Eurovision Song Contest 2022 with the song "Ela". At Eurovision, Andromache finished 12th in the second semi-final and failed to qualify for the final, ending Cyprus' qualification streak stretching back to 2015.

== Discography ==
=== Compilation albums ===
- Ela – The Album (2022)

Awards and achievements
Preceded by Elena Tsagrinou with "El Diablo"	Cyprus in the Eurovision Song Contest; 2022	Succeeded by Andrew Lambrou with "Break a Broken Heart"
