= Elena Tsagrinou =

Greek singer (born 1994)

Elena Tsagrinou Έλενα Τσαγκρινού
- Born: Eleni Tsagrinou; 16 November 1994 (age 31); Athens, Greece
- Genres: Pop; Dance-pop; Modern laïka
- Occupation: Singer
- Years active: 2013–present
- Labels: Feelgood (2013–2017); Panik (2017–present)

Elena Tsagrinou (Greek: Έλενα Τσαγκρινού; born November 16, 1994) is a Greek singer. Tsagrinou began her career as the lead singer of the Greek band OtherView, until beginning a solo career in 2018. She represented Cyprus in the Eurovision Song Contest 2021 with the song "El Diablo", finishing in 16th place.

== Life and career ==
Tsagrinou was born on November 16, 1994, in Athens to Kostas Tsagrinos and Popi Markopoulou. From a young age, she was involved in music and attended a music high school. In 2009, she participated in the Greek adaption of the Got Talent franchise from ANT1, Ellada Eheis Talento. Tsagrinou has a younger sister, Villy, born in 1998.

=== 2013–2018: OtherView, Just the 2 of Us and The Voice of Greece ===
In the summer of 2013, she was auditioned by the band OtherView (after Crystallia's withdrawal from the band) for the position of the lead singer and thus signed a contract with the record company Feelgood Records. On 8 January 2014, they released their first track entitled "What You Want", with lyrics and music by themselves and Gabriella Ellis. A few months later, they released their second track, entitled "O giros tou kosmou" (Around the World), which surpassed "What You Want" in views. The lyrics were written by Vassilis Koumentakos, as the music was composed by him, with the participation of Dimitris Isaris. At the same time, Tsagrinou participated in the music show of Mega Channel, Just the 2 of Us (the Greek adaption of the talent show Just the Two of Us) as coach of Ivan Svitailo.

In 2015, the band released four new tracks. "Dikaiosi" with Arva, "Ola Afta Pou Niotho", "In The Club Bi**h" and "Se Thelo Tora". The music of the songs was written mainly by them while the lyrics were written by Vassilis Koumentakos. In 2016, the tracks "Xana" and "Emeis Mazi" were released. The second was in collaboration with Goin' Through and was the soundtrack of the movie "The Bachelor". In the same year they appeared on MADWalk together with Josephine and Maria Korinthiou. In the 2016–2017 season, Tsagrinou was the backstage presenter on SKAI's talent show, The Voice of Greece, while as a band they made live appearances at BOX Athens with Melisses and Josephine.

In 2017, as a band, they announced their withdrawal from Feelgood Records and the collaboration with Panik Records. They even released two tracks with their own lyrics and music: "Asto Se Mena" and "Tora I Pote", while they appeared in two awards. At the MAD Video Music Awards, performing the song "Kane Me" in a remix with rapper Mike and the Cypriot Super Music Awards. They also participated in MADWalk - The Fashion Music Project and MTN MADWalk Cyprus.

In the 2017–2018 season, they appeared at the Fantasia Live nightclub with Josephine and then made some appearances with Konstantinos Argyros at Club Vogue in Thessaloniki. In the same year, they participated in MADWalk - The Fashion Music Project, performing "Havana" by Camila Cabello together with Thomai Apergi. In the middle of the same year, Tsagrinou announced her withdrawal from OtherView, after completing five years of collaboration, in order to pursue a solo career.

=== 2018–present: Solo career and Eurovision Song Contest ===
After her withdrawal from OtherView, she started the preparations for her first personal album, while in June 2018, she appeared at the MAD Video Music Awards, performing a remix of Panos Kiamos' track "Thelo Na se Xanado" with Bo. At the same time, she started appearances at the Fantasia Live nightclub with Konstantinos Argyros and Nino.

On 1 July 2018, she released her first solo track, entitled "Pame Ap' Tin Arhi", which a little later was released in English, as "Summer Romance". The lyrics were written by Nikos Moraitis while the music by Dimitris Kontopoulos. On 23 October of the same year, she released her second solo track, entitled "Paradeisos", with lyrics & music by ARCADE. On 6 December, the song "Ela tin protochronia" was released together with Elias Vrettos, Giorgos Kartelias, Elina Papila, Bo, REC, OGE and the radio station 104.8fm of Chalkida, with the aim of financially strengthening the voluntary, non-profit organization for special care and protection of mother and child, Ark of the World.

In the winter season 2018-2019 she made live appearances at the Fantasia Live nightclub with Konstantinos Argyros, Demy, 719 The Band, Andromache and George Livanis.

In April 2019, she participated in MADWalk - The Fashion Music Project, performing with Dakis the song "Tsai me Lemoni".

In June of the same year, she appeared at the MAD Video Music Awards performing the song "San Lava" with OGE.

On 2 November 2019, her third solo song was released, entitled "Logia" with lyrics and music by Leonidas Sozos. Also, in the same month, she started live appearances at BOX Athens with Melisses, Tamta & Matina Zara for the 2019–2020 season. In July 2020 she released her fourth solo song entitled "Amore" and a collaboration with Mike, entitled "Pare Me Agkalia". Also, in the summer of the same year, she performed at the nightclub Posidonio Music Hall with Panos Kiamos, Anastasios Rammos and Tania Karra.

On 25 November 2020, it was announced that she will represent Cyprus at the Eurovision Song Contest 2021, in Rotterdam, the Netherlands, with the song "El Diablo". The song place 16th out of 26 countries in the Grand Final.

In 2022, Tsagrinou released five songs: "Epafi" (with DJ Stephan), "Mykonos & Santorini", "Pes", "Ypoptevomai" (with DJ Stephan) and "Dali" (with OGE and MG).

In 2023, Tsagrinou released five songs: "Eleipes" (with DJ Stephan), "Pretty Girl" (with DJ Stephan and Blanco), "Gyrise?", "Sokolata Pagoto" and "Erotas". She also performed live at the nightclub BODEGA Live Experience, together with Sakis Arseniou, Christina Salti and Giorgos Veros.

In 2024, Tsagrinou released her first studio album (titled "ELENA" - produced by DJ Stephan and Nore Pierre) with ten songs: "Eisai Pantou", "Skyli", "Ftais", "Horisa", "No-Nooo", "Den Exeis Kardia", "Thima", "Eimaste Ena", "Logia Logia" and "Fotia". She also released five singles: "Misi Kardia" (with DJ Stephan), "S' Exo Kanei Theo", "Amartolo", "Adynamia" (with DJ Stephan) and "Psemata".

In 2025, Tsagrinou released the single "Social Media" (with Katerina Stikoudi) and the collab "Reggaeton" (with DJ Stephan on his album "Summer Love"). She also performed live at the nightclub Agioneri Panormou and at The Pre-Party Eurovision Edition, which took place in Malta, as a former representative of Cyprus. During the winter season 2025-26, Tsagrinou performed live at the nightclub Athinaia, together with Lefteris Pantazis, Angela Dimitriou, Aris Petrakis, Thanos Lambrou and Maria Pasalidou.

In 2026, Tsagrinou took part in the music show of Open TV, Just the 2 of Us as the coach of journalist Daphne Karavokyri.

== Personal life ==
From to 2017 to 2022, Tsagrinou had been in an on-off relationship with Greek rapper Mike. From 2022 to 2026, Tsagrinou had been in a relationship with DJ Stephan, with whom she has a son, Iraklis-Triantafyllos Stefanidis (b. August 9, 2024).

== Discography ==
=== Studio albums ===
Title	Details
Elena	Released: 15 November 2024

=== Compilation albums ===
Title	Details
El Diablo – The Album	Released: 12 May 2021; Label: Panik; Format: Digital download

=== Singles ===
==== Lead ====
Title	Year	Peak chart positions								Album
Title	Year	GRE	BEL (FL) Tip	FIN	IRE	NLD	NOR	SWE	UK	Album
"Pame Ap' Tin Arhi"	2018	—	—	—	—	—	—	—	—	El Diablo – The Album
"Paradeisos"	2018	—	—	—	—	—	—	—	—	El Diablo – The Album
"Logia"	2019	—	—	—	—	—	—	—	—	El Diablo – The Album
"Amore"	2020	—	—	—	—	—	—	—	—	El Diablo – The Album
"Pare Me Agkalia" (Feat. Mike)	2020	—	—	—	—	—	—	—	—	El Diablo – The Album
"El Diablo"	2021	9	2	6	60	31	13	20	86	El Diablo – The Album
"Telika I Zoi Sinehizetai" / "Love Goes On"	2021	—	—	—	—	—	—	—	—	Non-album singles
"Savvatovrada"	2021	—	—	—	—	—	—	—	—	Non-album singles
"Gurise?"	2023	—	—	—	—	—	—	—	—	
"—" denotes a recording that did not chart or was not released in that territory.

==== Promotional ====
Title	Year	Album
"Summer Romance"	2018	El Diablo – The Album
"San Lava"	2019	El Diablo – The Album
"Be My Lover" (with DJ Kas)	2021	El Diablo – The Album

== Videography ==
Title	Year	Notes
"What You Want"	2014	As member of OtherView
"O Giros tou Kosmou"	2014	As member of OtherView
"Ola Afta pou Niotho"	2015	As member of OtherView
"In The Club Bi**h"	2015	As member of OtherView
"Xana"	2016	As member of OtherView
"Tora I Pote"	2017	As member of OtherView
"Pame Ap' Tin Arhi"	2018	Solo
"Paradisos"	2018	Solo
"Logia"	2019	Solo
"Amore"	2020	Solo
"Pare Me Agkalia" (featuring Mike)	2020	Solo

== Filmography ==
=== Television ===
Year	Title	Role(s)	Notes
2009	Greece's Got Talent	Herself (contestant)	Season 2
2014	Just The 2 Of Us	Herself (contestant)	Season 2; 4th place
2016	MadWalk - The Fashion Music Project	Herself (performance)	TV special
2016-2017	The Voice of Greece	Herself (co-host)	Season 3
2017	MadWalk - The Fashion Music Project	Herself (performance)	TV special
2017	MTN MADWalk Cyprus	Herself (performance)	TV special
2017	MAD Video Music Awards	Herself (performance)	TV special
2017	Super Music Awards Cyprus	Herself (performance)	TV special
2018	MadWalk - The Fashion Music Project	Herself (performance)	TV special
2018	MAD Video Music Awards	Herself (performance)	TV special
2019	MadWalk - The Fashion Music Project	Herself (performance)	TV special
2019	MAD Video Music Awards	Herself (performance)	TV special
2020	MAD Video Music Awards	Herself (performance)	TV special
2021	Eurovision Song Contest 2021	Herself (contestant)	16th place
2021	MAD Video Music Awards	Herself (performance)	TV special
2021	MadWalk - The Fashion Music Project	Herself (performance)	TV special
2021-2022	Dancing with the Stars	Herself (contestant)	Season 7; 6 episodes
2022	MAD Video Music Awards	Herself (performance)	TV special
2026	Just the 2 of Us	Herself (contestant)	Season 9; 2 episodes

=== Film ===
Year	Title	Role	Notes	Ref.
2013	Free Birds	Jenny (voice)	Voice in Greek-language version	
2016	The Bachelor	Herself	cameo appearance	
2017	Smurfs: The Lost Village	Smurflily (voice)	Voice in Greek-language version	

Awards and achievements
Preceded by Sandro Nicolas with "Running"	Cyprus in the Eurovision Song Contest; 2021	Succeeded by Andromache with "Ela"
