= Ermal Peçi =

Albanian television host

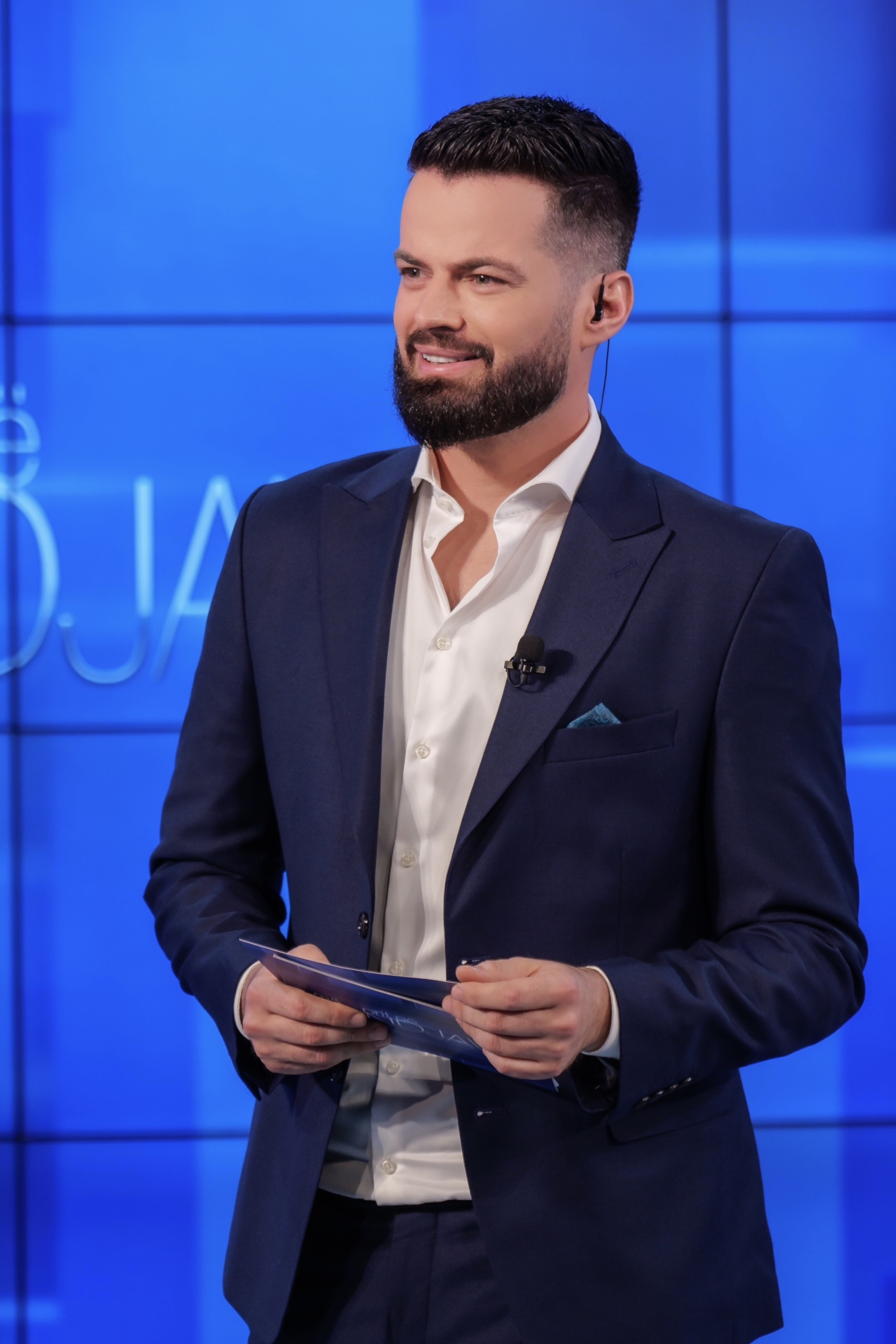
- Born: 16 August 1988 (age 37); Berat, Albania
- Occupation: Television host
- Years active: 2006–present

Ermal Peçi (born 16 August 1988 in Berat) is an Albanian television presenter, author and digital creator with a strong presence on social medias.

He is best known for hosting various television programs in Albania, particularly entertainment and talk shows. Over the years, he has gained recognition for his engaging style and presence on television, becoming a well-known figure in the Albanian media industry. His work often involves interviewing celebrities and discussing a range of topics from entertainment to social issues.

Currently, he hosts the Sunday evening show “Me prit të dielën” (Wait for Me on Sunday), airing in prime time at 9:00 PM on MCN. As the author of the program, he introduces for the first time in Albanian media an artificial intelligence agent designed to create surprises for guests. Thanks to the agent named “Hënor”, the guests are presented with video materials from their own lives, updated and recreated through artificial intelligence.

In February 2023, he became part of the public broadcaster Radio Televizioni Shqiptar (RTSH), hosting Më prit në fundjavë and from October 2023 hosting 'E diela jonë. Friends of Europe chose Ermal Peçi as the Albanian representative at the European Young Leaders 2023 in Brussels, Belgium.

He has worked since 2006 for a number of broadcasters, including Arberia National Television, Agon Channel, ABC and IN TV.

Peçi is mostly known for interviewing popular artists on his shows 'E diela jonë', Më prit në fundjavë, ABC e pasdites, Trokit, Një kat më lart, Euro Beat and also for his reality show Heart Attack on Agon Channel. Loreen, Barbara Pravi, Fabrizio Corona and Giusy Ferreri are some international celebrities interviewed by him. He also took part in Dance with Me Albania 6 (September–December 2019) on TV Klan.

Peçi has also participated in hosting or promoting other music and cultural events throughout Albania, reaching a diverse broadcast and social media audience. He hosted 'Miss Shqipëria 2025, The Miss Globe 2023 Netët e Klipit Shqiptar, and Colour Day Festival.

== TV shows ==
- Më prit të dielën ( 2025 -2026 MCN)
- E diela jonë (2023 - 2024 - 2025 RTSH)
- Më prit në fundjavë (2023, RTSH)
- ABC e pasdites (2020–2022, ABC News)
- Dance with Me Albania 6 (2019 VIP cast, TV Klan)
- Trokit (2018–2019, IN TV)
- Një kat më lart (2018, IN TV)
- Euro Beat (2018, IN TV)
- Heart Attack (2013–2014, Agon Channel)
- Antilope (2013, Agon Channel)
- Dita e shtatë (2013, Agon Channel)
- Start (2008–2010, Ora News)

== Festivals ==
- Netët e Klipit Shqiptar (2023 - 2024 - 2025)
- Miss Shqipëria (2024 - 2025)
- Miss Globe (2023)
- Tirana Summit (2023)
- Colour Day Festival (2022–2023 - 2024)
- Korça Beer Fest (2022–2023)
- ABBA Tribute (2022)
- World of Dance Albania (2019–2020)
