= Barrice =

Greek singer

- Born: Barrice Sobolev; 5 December 1984 (age 41); Shymkent, Kazakh SSR, Soviet Union
- Origin: Athens, Greece
- Genres: Pop, RnB, Hip hop, Electronica
- Occupations: Singer, songwriter, producer
- Years active: 2012–present
- Label: Spicy

Barrice Sobolev (born 5 December 1984) known as Barrice, is a Greek singer, songwriter and producer. He was chosen to be one of the five acts bidding to represent Greece in the Eurovision Song Contest 2015 with the song "Ela". He recently released his last single with the record label Spicy called "Zitima Zois ke Thanatou" and is working on new upcoming release.

== Early life ==
Sobolev was born on 5 December 1984 in Shymkent. He moved to Sukhumi, Georgia and lived with his family for two years and then immigrated to Greece when he was still young. He got involved with the music to a young age since his mother was a music teacher. Barrice moved with his family to Athens and he started working as a disc jockey. Passing to the Marketing & Communication department in the University of Athens, Barrice made his first steps singing and writing songs.

== Career ==
=== 2012–present: Debut and Eurosong 2015 ===
Barrice made his debut when he was chosen to be the act of the Positive Group Vegas, in Amita Motion and then he released his first single "Na souna edo". However, he has made many covers of known English and Greek songs, some of them "Don't" by Ed Sheeran, "Eleges" by Melisses etc.

He was selected to participate in the Greek National Final, a national selection to select the Greek representative for the Eurovision Song Contest 2015 which was held on 4 March in Enastron Music Hall in Tavros, Athens. Barrice performed third and he failed to represent Greece in the Eurovision 2014 getting the fourth place.

=== Singles ===
Title	Year	Peak chart positions	Album
Title	Year	GRE	Album
"Να σουνα εδώ"	2013	—	TBA
"Ela"	2015		TBA
"Ζήτημα Ζωής και Θανάτου"	2015		TBA
