= Tim Aeby =

French music producer, songwriter

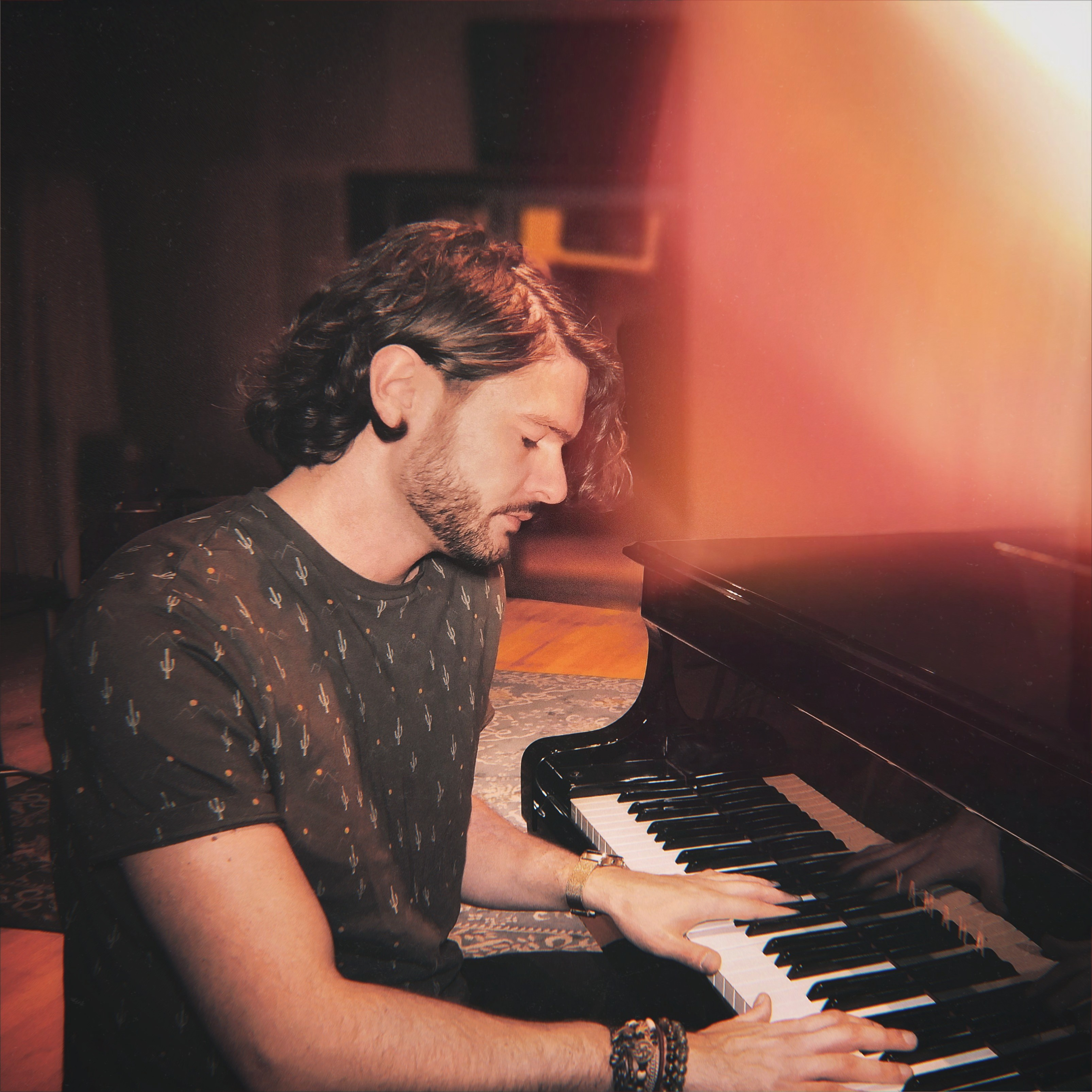
- Tim Aeby in the studio

Background information
- Born: 27 April 1987 (age 38); France
- Genres: Pop, Dance, Urban
- Occupations: Producer, Songwriter
- Instruments: Piano, Guitar
- Years active: 2012–present
- Labels: Spinnin Records, Ultra Music, Sony/ATV, Down2Earth Music, Universal Music Germany,
- Website: www.timaeby.com

Tim Aeby (born 27 April 1987) is a French music producer and songwriter. He has worked with Claydee, Lexy Panterra, Jenn Morel, Bang La Decks, Cammora, and many other artists. The song "Claydee feat. Lexy Panterra - Dame Dame", his most notable work so far received more than 28.000.000 views on YouTube within the first 6 months after its release. He produces mainly pop, dance and urban music.

== Personal work ==
In the past, Aeby has released multiple songs under his aliases Enzo Darren, Cosmow and D3nch. He got support from artists such as Nicky Romero, Tiesto, Knife Party, Ferry Corsten.

Aeby created his own label, Thp Music, in 2011. After a 6-year run with his company he decided to focus solely on his career as a producer.

== Producer and songwriter credits ==
Year	Song	Artist	Label
2013	Paint The World (Feat. Chester Rushing)	Jidax & Enzo Darren	Universal Music Germany
2013	Nola	Enzo Darren	Flashover Recordings
2015	Adonis	Enzo Darren feat. Delaney Jane	Enhanced Music
2016	Standout	Cosmow	Boy's Deep, Bang Record
2016	Spoke The Words (Cosmow Remix)	Mahama vs. Wolf Tide	Ultra Music
2017	Notayo	Claydee	Down2Earth Music
2017	What You Want (feat. Nicole Gartz)	Tim Gartz & Cammora	Ocean Music Group / Warner Music
2017	Afterglow (feat. Glennellen)	Cosmow	Boy's Deep, Bang Record
2017	On My Way	Cammora	Spinnin' Records
2017	I Need You Now	Cayo & Cammora	Planetworks / Down2Earth Music
2017	Dame Dame	Claydee feat. Lexy Panterra	Down2Earth Music
2017	Όταν με φιλάς - Otan Me Filas	Vegas (band)	Spicy
2018	Licky	Claydee feat. Jenn Morel	Down2Earth Music / Ego Music
2018	Don't Need My Love	Andy Nicolas	Ocean Music Group & Down2Earth Music
2018	Best Friend	Cammora	Spinnin' Records
2018	Donde Estas	Nikki Lee, Claydee, Alex Lupa	Down2Earth Music
2018	Charice	Cayo & Platon Emil	Planetworks / Down2Earth Music
2018	Dynamite	Alterglow	Alterglow Music
2019	Mean It	Andy Nicolas	Down2Earth Music
2019	Barcelona	Eleni Foureira	Panik Records
2019	Take Me Anywhere (feat. Platone)	Cosmow	Aux Records
2020	Charlie	Lana Scolaro	B1 Recordings - Sony Music
