= Lana Scolaro =

- Born: 27 December 1994 (age 31); London, England
- Genres: Electronic music; hip hop; pop; techno
- Occupations: Disc jockey; singer; songwriter; record producer; entrepreneur
- Instruments: Cello; guitar
- Years active: 2014–present
- Labels: PowerHouse; B1 Recordings; Extensive Music

Lana Scolaro (born 27 December 1994) is a London-born disc jockey, singer, record producer, songwriter and entrepreneur, who has performed at events such as Ultra Music Festival, Creamfields and Mirage, and has collaborated with artists like Bob Sinclar, Luciano and SVNF8, and others.

== Biography ==
=== Early years and education ===
Born in London, Scolaro was drawn to music from childhood, and began playing cello at the age of fourteen and guitar at sixteen. In 2012 she moved to New York City, and between 2013 and 2014 she studied design at Parsons School of Design.

=== Career ===
After finishing her studies, Scolaro founded LS Diamonds, her own jewellery company. Together with her sister Stephanie she designed the mobile photo and video app Do a Wilson, available for Apple devices. In 2015 Scolaro appeared in the British documentary television series Cutting Edge, in the episode "The Rich Kids of Instagram".

After living in New York City, she moved to Los Angeles, where she began working with renowned artists in recording studios. Inspired by the music scene in Ibiza, where she spends part of her time, in mid-2016 she began as a disc jockey. Scolaro initially participated in events at clubs like 1Hotel Rooftop Miami and Soho House, before appearing at the Ultra Music Festival in Miami alongside French DJ and producer Bob Sinclar in 2018. She has since participated in electronic music events such as the Road to Nowhere, Creamfields and Mirage festivals, and has performed at venues such as SantAnna on the island of Mykonos (alongside DJ Luciano), at the Ministry of Sound club and at the anniversary of the Hed Kandi label, among others.

After starring in the music video for Martin Rafferty's "The Way We Used to Be", between and 2018 and 2019 Scolaro released the singles "Rick Ross", "AK's On My Chain", "So Stoopid", "Trip", "All Night" and "Heartbreak High" through independent labels. In 2020 she partnered with PowerHouse Records, a subsidiary of Sony Music, with which she released the singles "Just Dance" (with Yoel and Dagcan Erdurak) and "Deepend" (with Munar). With the label B1 Recordings (a Sony Music publishing company), she released the same year the song "Charlie", composed by Robert Uhlmann, Tim Aeby, Basshunter, Linnea Deb and Svidden, and the single "Twin Flames", with SVNF8.

In 2021, Scolaro collaborated with music producer and composer Diztortion on the song "Kitty!", released on PowerHouse Records. In May 2022, she announced the release of his new single, titled "Pages" and recorded in acoustic format.

== Discography ==
=== Singles ===
==== As lead artist ====
List of singles as lead artist
| Title | Year | Label |
|---|---|---|
| "Rick Ross" | 2018 | Two Six Records |
| "All Night" | 2018 | Two Six Records |
| "AK's on My Chain" | 2018 | Self-released |
| "Trip" | 2018 | Self-released |
| "So Stoopid" | 2018 | The Beat Republic |
| "Heartbreak High" | 2019 | Self-released |
| "Charlie" | 2020 | B1 Recordings |
| "Bad Things" | 2020 | Self-released |
| "Just Dance" (Dagcan Erdurak feat. Yoel) | 2020 | PowerHouse |
| "Deepend" (vs. Munar) | 2020 | PowerHouse |
| "Kitty" | 2021 | PowerHouse |

==== As featured artist ====
List of singles as featured artist
| Title | Year | Label |
|---|---|---|
| "Twin Flames"(SVNF8) | 2020 | 720mau5 LLC |

=== Music videos ===
==== As lead artist ====
List of music videos as lead artist and directors
| Title | Year | Director(s) | Ref. |
|---|---|---|---|
| "So Stoopid" | 2019 | Unknown | |
| "Heartbreak High" | 2019 | Unknown | |

==== As featured artist ====
List of music videos as featured artist and directors
| Title | Year | Director(s) | Ref. |
|---|---|---|---|
| "The Way We Used to Be" (Martin Rafferty) | 2018 | Jim Crone | |

==== Lyric videos ====
List of lyric videos and directors
| Title | Year | Director(s) | Ref. |
|---|---|---|---|
| "Just Dance" | 2020 | Unknown | |
| "Kitty" | 2021 | Unknown | |
