= Fyell brezi =

Albanian aerophone instrument

- Albanian Fyell Brezi
- Other names: fyell shoke fyell bariu
- Classification: Wind; Woodwind; Aerophone

Related instruments
- Floghera; lamzdeliai; shvi

The fyell brezi, also known as fyell shoke or fyell bariu, is an aerophone end-blown instrument traditionally played throughout Albania and other Albanian inhabited lands. The instrument is commonly associated with shepherds of the Albanian highlands, commonly referred to as the Dukagjin highlands.

== Etymology ==
The name fyell brezi is a compound of two words, Albanian: Fyell, 'flute' and Albanian: Brez (clothing), 'Waistband'. fyell derives from Proto-Albanian *spāli, from Proto-Indo-European *spel-. Brez derives from *bren + suffix -ëz, from Proto-Albanian *breuna, from Proto-Indo-European *breun-. Its other name, fyell shoke derives from a similar sense. Both names developed from the idea that shepherds kept their flutes strapped into their waistbands in order to carry the flute around.

== Overview ==
The fyell brezi is traditionally hand-crafted out of wood. The wood traditionally used was the inner-most section of the trunk of a Fir tree, as it is the most common type of wood found in Albania. Today it is crafted from any accessible wood source. It consists of 6 holes in the front and has a sharp edge at the upper end of the tube. The sharp edge allows the flutists breath to escape, giving the instrument a different tone from most common end-blown flutes. The instrument was most commonly used among shepherds who played it while tending to their flocks. It is regarded as one of the oldest instruments of Albanian folklore. It is also frequently used in folk music and accompanies traditional Albanian festivities and songs. The fyell brezi has been a traditional staple during the festivity of Dita e Verës (English: Summer Day).

== Performers ==
The most well known performer of the fyell brezi is Shaqir Hoti, a well known Albanian flutist. The fyell brezi is also performed by traditional artists such as Nikollë Nikprelaj and Rifat Berisha.
