= El Diablo (Elena Tsagrinou song) =

2021 song by Elena Tsagrinou

Single by Elena Tsagrinou

from the album El Diablo – The Album
- Released: 28 February 2021
- Length: 3:01
- Label: Panik
- Songwriters: Jimmy "Joker" Thörnfeldt; Laurell Barker; Cleiton "OXA" Sia; Thomas Stengaard
- Producers: Jimmy "Joker" Thörnfeldt; Thomas Stengaard

Elena Tsagrinou singles chronology
"Amore" (2020)	"El Diablo" (2021)

Music video
- "El diablo" on YouTube

Eurovision Song Contest 2021 entry
- Country: Cyprus
- Artist: Elena Tsagrinou
- Composers: Jimmy "Joker" Thörnfeldt; Laurell Barker; Cleiton "OXA" Sia; Thomas Stengaard
- Lyricists: Jimmy "Joker" Thörnfeldt; Laurell Barker; Cleiton "OXA" Sia; Thomas Stengaard

Finals performance
- Semi-final result: 6th
- Semi-final points: 170
- Final result: 16th
- Final points: 94

Entry chronology
- ◄ "Running" (2020)
- "Ela" (2022) ►

"El Diablo" is a song recorded by Greek singer Elena Tsagrinou, released as a single on 28 February 2021 for her album with the same name. It was written and composed by Jimmy "Joker" Thörnfeldt, Laurell Barker, Oxa and Thomas Stengaard. The song represented Cyprus in the Eurovision Song Contest 2021 in Rotterdam, the Netherlands, after being internally selected by the Cyprus Broadcasting Corporation (CyBC).

== Background and composition ==
"El Diablo" was written and composed by Jimmy "Joker" Thörnfeldt, Laurell Barker, Oxa and Thomas Stengaard. The song's meaning was described as about "falling in love with someone as bad as the devil", used as a metaphor for Stockholm Syndrome. The song's title was revealed on 25 November along with Tsagrinou's announcement that she would represent Cyprus in the Eurovision Song Contest 2021 in Rotterdam. The song was released on 28 February 2021.

== Release and promotion ==
A music video for "El Diablo" was filmed in Athens. A preview of "El Diablo" was presented to the public on 24 February 2021 during the RIK 1 programme Happy Hour, hosted by Andreas Giortsios. The official preview video for the song, directed by George Benioudakis was also available on the Panik Records mobile app and website. The music video was hosted on the website until 27 February; the following day, the song and full-length music video were officially released to the public.

== Controversy and criticism ==
Upon the song's release, the Cyprus Broadcasting Corporation received numerous threatening phone calls. Just over 20,000 people signed on Avaaz to urge for the cancellation of the country's Eurovision participation. The track received criticism from some members of the public, as well as a few public figures on the island for the inclusion of the lyrics "I fell in love/ I fell in love/ I gave my heart to El Diablo". The Church of Cyprus felt that the song was offensive, disrespectful and unrepresentative, and demanded that the state broadcaster CyBC withdraw Cyprus' Eurovision entry. However, the song had the full support by the government, the CyBC and the majority of the public in Cyprus. The government has since publicly rejected the reactions from religious and conservative groups, claiming it respects both spiritual rights but also the freedom of artistic expression. In February 2021, Orthodox Christians in Cyprus launched an online petition to ask the withdrawal from the Eurovision Song Contest.

== Eurovision Song Contest ==
=== Internal selection ===
In November 2020, the Cyprus Broadcasting Corporation (CyBC) announced Greek singer Elena Tsagrinou as the Cypriot representative for the Eurovision Song Contest 2021 with the song "El Diablo". Prior to her selection, Tsagrinou called Eurovision an institution that she'd been following for many years. She added that if the right song was found, it would be her pleasure and honour to compete.

=== In Rotterdam ===
The 65th edition of the Eurovision Song Contest took place in Rotterdam, the Netherlands and consisted of two semi-finals on 18 May and 20 May 2021, and the grand final on 22 May 2021. According to the Eurovision rules, each participating country, except the host country and the "Big Five", consisting of France, Germany, Italy, Spain and the United Kingdom, are required to qualify from one of two semi-finals to compete for the final. On 17 November 2020, it was announced that Cyprus would be performing in the second half of the first semi-final of the contest. During this second semi-final, Cyprus performed as 8th act and ended in 6th place with 170 points, qualifying the country for the final. In the final, Cyprus performed as 1st act and ended in 16th place with 94 points.

== Charts ==
Chart performance for "El Diablo"
Chart (2021)	Peak position
Belgium (Ultratip Bubbling Under Flanders)	2
Finland (Suomen virallinen lista)	6
Greece (IFPI)	9
Iceland (Tónlistinn)	14
Ireland (IRMA)	60
Latvia (EHR)	3
Lithuania (AGATA)	8
Netherlands (Single Top 100)	31
Norway (VG-lista)	13
Sweden (Sverigetopplistan)	20
UK Singles (OCC)	86
UK Indie (OCC)	19

== Certifications ==
Certifications for "El Diablo"
Region	Certification	Certified units/sales
Greece (IFPI Greece)	Gold	1,000,000^{†}
^{†} Streaming-only figures based on certification alone.

== Release history ==
Release history for "El Diablo"
Region	Date	Format(s)	Label	Ref.
Various	28 February 2021	Digital download; streaming	Panik	
