= Greece in the Eurovision Song Contest 2015 =

- Eurovision Song Contest 2015
- Participating broadcaster: New Hellenic Radio, Internet and Television (NERIT)
- Country: Greece
- Selection process: Eurosong 2015 – NERIT & MAD show (60 years of music)
- Selection date: 4 March 2015

Competing entry
- Song: "One Last Breath"
- Artist: Maria Elena Kyriakou
- Songwriters: Efthivoulos Theocharous; Maria Elena Kyriakou; Vaggelis Konstantinidis; Evelina Tziora

Placement
- Semi-final result: Qualified (6th, 81 points)
- Final result: 19th, 23 points

Participation chronology

Greece was represented at the Eurovision Song Contest 2015 with the song "One Last Breath", written by Efthivoulos Theocharous, Maria Elena Kyriakou, Vaggelis Konstantinidis, and Evelina Tziora, and performed by Kyriakou herself. The Greek participating broadcaster, New Hellenic Radio, Internet and Television (NERIT), selected its entry for the contest through the five-participant national final Eurosong 2015 – NERIT & MAD show, developed by NERIT and organised and produced by the private music channel MAD TV.

Greece was drawn to compete in the first semi-final of the Eurovision Song Contest, which took place on 19 May 2015. Performing during the show in position 6, "One Last Breath" was among the top 10 entries of the first semi-final and therefore qualified to compete in the final. It was later revealed that Greece placed sixth out of the 18 participating countries in the semi-final with 81 points. At the final, held four days later, Greece performed 15th out of the 27 finalists and finished in 19th place with 23 points.

== Background ==
Prior to the 2015 contest, Greece had participated in the Eurovision Song Contest 35 times since its first entry in 1974. To this point, they won the contest once, in 2005 with the song "My Number One" performed by Helena Paparizou, and placed third three times: in 2001 with the song "Die for You" performed by the duo Antique; in 2004 with "Shake It" performed by Sakis Rouvas; and in 2008 with "Secret Combination" performed by Kalomira. Greece had managed to qualify for the final every year since the introduction of semi-finals in 2004, and between 2004 and 2013, the nation achieved nine top ten placements. Greece's least successful result was in 1998 when it placed 20th with the song "Mia krifi evaisthisia" by Thalassa, receiving only 12 points in total, all from Cyprus.

Historically, the Hellenic Broadcasting Corporation (ERT), as the European Broadcasting Union (EBU) member in the country, has participated in the Eurovision Song Contest representing Greece. However, in August 2013, the Greek government shut down the radio and television services of ERT, leaving Greece's future participation in question. The EBU allowed the temporary broadcaster Dimosia Tileorasi (DT) to participate in the 2014 contest. DT then partnered with the private music channel MAD TV to select the entry. On 4 May 2014, two days before to the 2014 contest's first semi-final, the new Greek public broadcaster, New Hellenic Radio, Internet and Television (NERIT), was launched allowing the participation to formally proceed. Though not yet an Active Member of the EBU at the time, the broadcaster was allowed to take part in the contest based on an exception granted by the EBU.

On 24 July 2014, NERIT confirmed its intention to compete in the 2015 contest, however, its participation was reliant upon becoming an Active Member of the EBU. Its application was reviewed at the EBU General Assembly and on 5 December 2014, NERIT was granted EBU membership, allowing the participation to proceed.

== Before Eurovision ==
=== Eurosong 2015 – NERIT & MAD show (60 years of music) ===
NERIT confirmed on 14 January 2015 that it would partner with private music channel MAD TV to organize and produce Greece's selection process for the Eurovision Song Contest 2015, marking the third consecutive year of their partnership. The national final event, titled Eurosong 2015 – NERIT & MAD show (60 years of music), took place on 4 March 2015 at the Enastron Music Hall in Tavros, Athens, and was hosted by Mary Sinatsaki and Doretta Papadimitriou. The show was televised on NERIT in Greece and on RIK 2 and RIK Sat in Cyprus. It was also available online through NERIT's website nerit.gr and the official Eurovision Song Contest website eurovision.tv.

==== Competing entries ====
NERIT put out a call for interest to major record labels to find participants for the show, resulting in five candidate acts. The five acts (Barrice, C:Real, Maria Elena Kyriakou, Shaya Hansen, and Thomai Apergi & Legend) were announced on 17 February 2015. Snippets of the songs aired during the morning radio show of NERIT's Second Programme on 18 February, during a broadcast hosted by Maria Kozakou, who had served as Greece's contest commentator for the prior three editions of the contest. A presentation show, where the audience was able to hear each song in full, then aired on 26 February.

Prior to the announcement of the final participants list, 2007 Greek national final participant Tamta and Dionysis Schoinas were publicized by the media as being included (in place of eventual participants Kyriakou and Barrice, respectively). Tamta subsequently released her selected song "Unloved" in late May following the conclusion of the contest. The selection process was objected to publicly by record label Polymusic, which claimed that NERIT did not solicit proposals from all labels and instead "played favourites"; they then threatened to sue the broadcaster to force their inclusion. They revealed that they had intended to propose Alexandra Koniak, formerly of the group Stavento, as their candidate.

Competing entries
Artist	Song	Songwriter(s)	Label
Barrice	"Ela"	Niclas Olausson and the Beatbox, Victoria Chalkiti	Spicy Music
C:Real	"Crash and Burn"	Takis Dimaschis	Feelgood Records
Maria Elena Kyriakou	"One Last Breath"	Efthivoulos Theocharous, Maria Elena Kyriakou, Vaggelis Konstantinidis, Evelina Tziora	Minos EMI - Universal
Shaya Hansen	"Sunshine"	Shaya Hansen, Thomas Reil, Jeppe Reil, Marios Psimopoulos	Planetworks
Thomai Apergi and Legend	"Jazz & Sirtaki"	Christos Papadopoulos, Giannis Sinnis	Panik Records

==== Final ====
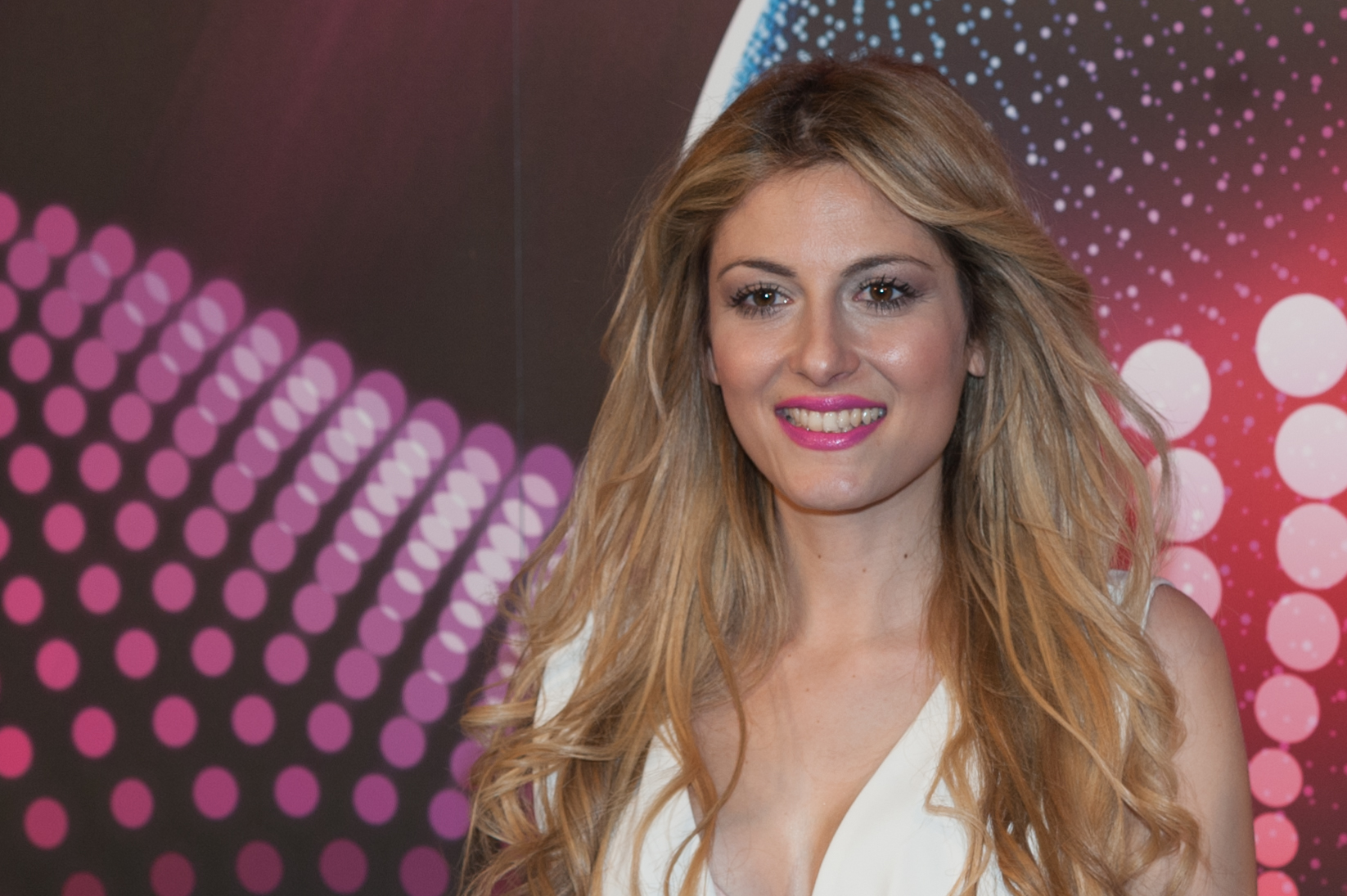
Maria Elena Kyriakou was selected as the 2015 Greek Eurovision entrant with the song "One Last Breath".

The final took place on 4 March 2015. Five songs competed and the winner, "One Last Breath" performed by the Cypriot singer Maria Elena Kyriakou, was selected by a 50-50 combination of public and jury voting. Kyriakou was previously known for being the winner of the first season of The Voice of Greece. Her song was written by Kyriakou, Efthivoulos Theocharous, Vaggelis Konstantinidis, and Evelina Tziora.

Public voting during the show was conducted through telephone or SMS, with 33,672 votes being cast. The seven-member jury panel consisted of Nikos Ksanthoulis (composer and director of music for NERIT), Michalis Oikonomou (composer), Giorgos Niarchos (composer), Jick Nakassian, Litsa Piskera (former public relations for ERT), Reggina Kouri (public relations for MAD TV), and Marianna Efstratiou (who represented Greece in 1989 and 1996).

In addition to the performances of the competing entries, the interval acts featured guest performances by Helena Paparizou (who won Eurovision for Greece in 2005), One (who represented Cyprus in 2002), Loukas Yorkas (who represented Greece in 2011), Freaky Fortune and Riskykidd (who represented Greece in 2014), Thanos Kalliris (who represented Greece in 1987) performing with the group Kings, the group Boys and Noise, and Giannis Karagiannis (who would represent Cyprus in 2015). The show celebrated the 60th anniversary of the Eurovision Song Contest as well as the 10 year anniversary of Greece's 2005 win.

Final – 4 March 2015
R/O	Artist	Song	Jury	Televote	Total	Place
1	C:Real	"Crash and Burn"	1	1	2	5
2	Thomai Apergi and Legend	"Jazz & Sirtaki"	4	3	7	2
3	Barrice	"Ela"	3	2	5	4
4	Shaya Hansen	"Sunshine"	2	4	6	3
5	Maria Elena Kyriakou	"One Last Breath"	5	5	10	1

=== Promotion ===
The Eurovision version of the song was released on 20 March 2015, and a Greek version of the song titled "Mia anapnoi" was released in mid-April. To promote the song, Kyriakou appeared on 20 April at the Eurovision in Concert series, an event held at the club Melkweg in Amsterdam, Netherlands that was staged to serve as a preview party for the year's entries. The following weekend, she attended the London Eurovision Party on 27 April where she sang her entry "One Last Breath". Further promotional activities included Kyriakou performing live at the MAD TV annual fashion music series MADwalk on 29 April.

== At Eurovision ==
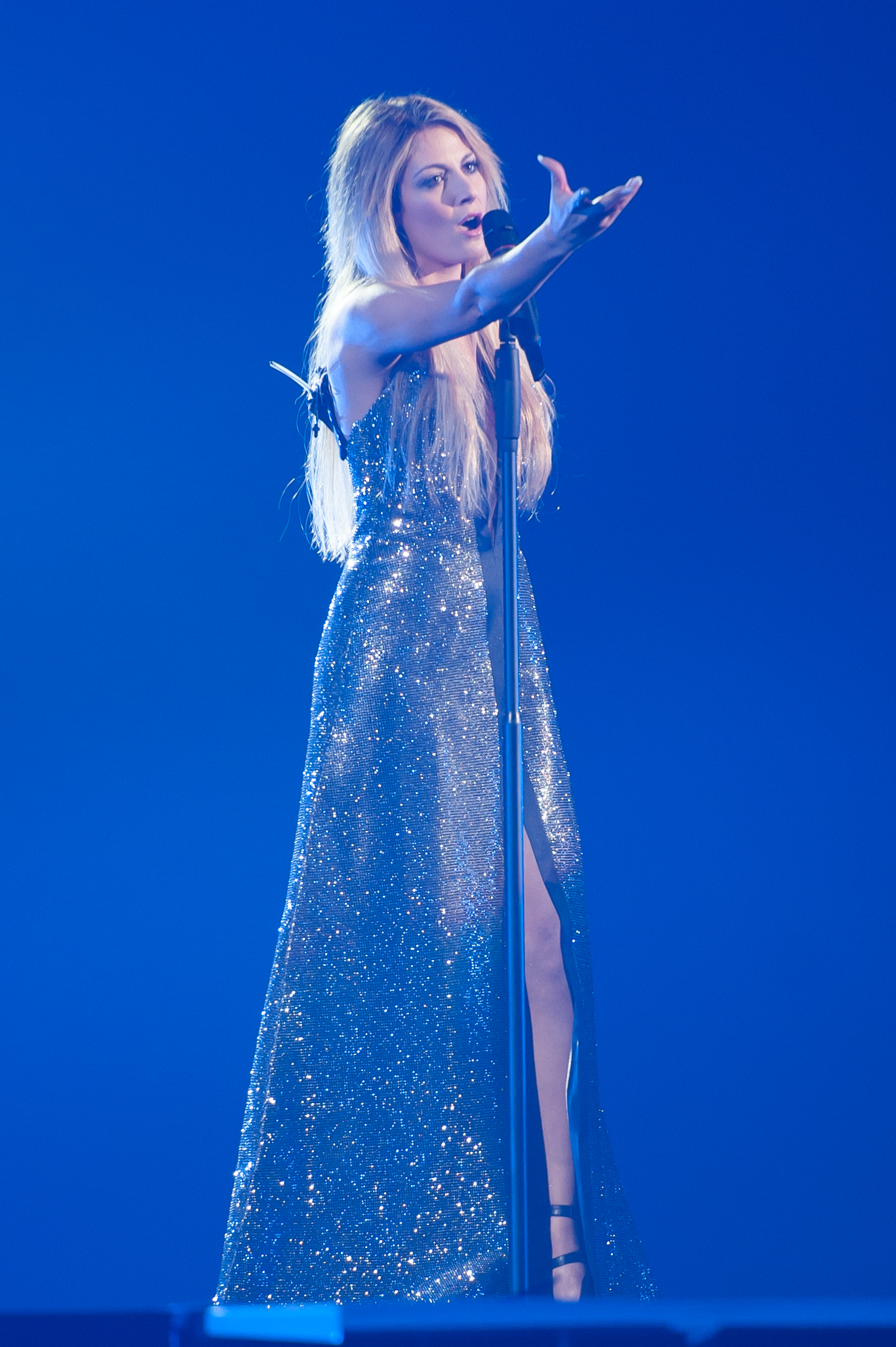
Maria Elena Kyriakou performing "One Last Breath" at a semi-final rehearsal.

The Eurovision Song Contest 2015 took place at Wiener Stadthalle in Vienna, Austria. It consisted of two semi-finals held on 19 and 21 May, respectively, and the final on 23 May 2015. Within Greece, the shows aired on televisions stations NERIT and NERIT HD, with a radio broadcast on Second Programme. Maria Kozakou and Giorgos Kapoutzidis provided commentary for the broadcasts, continuing a role they had performed together for the prior three contests.

All nations, with the exceptions of the host country and the "Big Five", consisting of France, Germany, Italy, Spain, and the United Kingdom, were required to qualify from one of the two semi-finals to compete for the final; the top 10 countries from each semi-final progressed to the final. For this contest, Australia was also automatically included in the final as an invited guest nation.

To determine when the semi-finalists would perform, the EBU split up the competing countries into five different pots based on voting patterns from the prior 10 years. On 26 January 2015, an allocation draw was held which placed each country into one of the two semi-finals and determined which half of the show they would perform in. At this event, Greece was placed into the first semi-final, to be held on 19 May 2015, and was scheduled to perform in the first half of the show. Once all the competing songs for the 2015 contest had been released, the running order for the semi-finals was decided by the shows' producers rather than through another draw, so that similar songs were not placed next to each other. Greece was set to perform sixth out of 16 in its semi-final, following the entry from Finland and preceding the entry from Estonia.

=== Performances ===
Kyriakou took part in technical rehearsals on 11 and 15 May, followed by dress rehearsals on 18 and 19 May 2015. This included the jury final where professional juries of each country, responsible for 50 percent of each country's vote, watched and voted on the competing entries. The Greek performance was choreographed by Maria Lyraraki with styling by Kostas Zisis. It saw Kyriakou wearing in a silver and black dress designed by Dimitris Petrou, and set to a background of a circle of blue LED lights. Accompanying Kyriakou on stage was the composer of the song Theocharous, who played piano, as well as Alexandros Oikonomou and Katerina Kyriakou, who provided backing vocals.

Following the first semi-final, Greece's advancement to the final was announced, with the country having secured a place in the top ten entries from its semi-final. Immediately after the first semi-final, a winner's press conference convened for the ten countries that qualified, allowing their artists to participate in a draw determining their performance segment in the final. Greece was designated to compete in the second half. Following this draw, the show's producers arranged the running order for the final, positioning Greece to perform in position 15, succeeding Austria and preceding Montenegro. After Greece's performance in the final, held four days later, the nation placed 19th with 23 points. The next day, Kyriakou was interviewed by the morning show Proino SouKou where spoke about her experience and identified her concerns with how the votes went. She specifically called out the fact that countries that finished below Greece in the semi-final ended up ahead of it in the final.

=== Voting ===
Voting during the three shows involved each country awarded 1–8, 10, and 12 points as determined by a combination of 50% national jury and 50% televoting. The jury consisted of five music industry professionals who were citizens of the country they represent. This jury was asked to judge each contestant based on vocal capacity, the stage performance, the song's composition and originality and the overall impression by the act. The individual rankings of each jury member were released shortly after the final.

In the first semi-final, Greece placed sixth with 81 points, which included the top 12 points from Albania. In the final, Greece placed 19th with 23 points, with its highest point award being 10 from Albania. The nation awarded its 12 points to Russia in the first semi-final and Italy in the final. NERIT appointed Helena Paparizou as its spokesperson to announce the Greek voting results during the final. The tables below show a complete breakdown of points awarded to Greece in both the first semi-final and the final of the Eurovision Song Contest 2015, as well as by the country on both occasions.

==== Points awarded to Greece ====
Points awarded to Greece (Semi-final 1)
Score	Country
12 points	Albania
10 points	
8 points	Armenia
7 points	
6 points	Australia; Netherlands; Romania; Serbia
5 points	Russia
4 points	Austria; Georgia; Macedonia
3 points	Belarus; Belgium; France; Hungary; Moldova
2 points	Finland; Spain
1 point	Estonia

Points awarded to Greece (Final)
Score	Country
12 points	
10 points	Albania
8 points	Cyprus
7 points	
6 points	
5 points	Armenia
4 points	
3 points	
2 points	
1 point	

==== Points awarded by Greece ====
Points awarded by Greece (Semi-final 1)
Score	Country
12 points	Russia
10 points	Albania
8 points	Georgia
7 points	Armenia
6 points	Belgium
5 points	Romania
4 points	Estonia
3 points	Belarus
2 points	Serbia
1 point	Denmark

Points awarded by Greece (Final)
Score	Country
12 points	Italy
10 points	Cyprus
8 points	Russia
7 points	Belgium
6 points	Albania
5 points	Australia
4 points	Sweden
3 points	Latvia
2 points	Georgia
1 point	Armenia

==== Detailed voting results ====
The following members comprised the Greek jury:

- Jick Nakassian (jury chairperson) – composer, conductor for Greece in 1980
- Antonios Karatzikos – DJ
- Helen Giannatsoulia – lyricist
- Ioannis Koutsaftakis – artists management, A&R
- Marianna Efstratiou – singer, songwriter, represented Greece in 1989 and 1996 contests

Detailed voting results from Greece (Semi-final 1)
R/O	Country	J. Nakassian	A. Karatzikos	H. Giannatsoulia	I. Koutsaftakis	M. Efstratiou	Jury Rank	Televote Rank	Combined Rank	Points
01	Moldova	8	13	13	15	9	13	10	13	
02	Armenia	7	3	9	2	8	5	4	4	7
03	Belgium	2	4	7	3	1	2	8	5	6
04	Netherlands	12	12	6	12	6	11	14	14	
05	Finland	13	15	12	7	14	14	9	12	
06	Greece									
07	Estonia	14	5	4	8	13	9	6	7	4
08	Macedonia	15	14	11	14	15	15	15	15	
09	Serbia	11	11	15	13	7	12	7	9	2
10	Hungary	5	7	14	11	11	10	11	11	
11	Belarus	4	6	5	5	4	3	13	8	3
12	Russia	1	1	1	6	2	1	3	1	12
13	Denmark	9	10	8	9	5	8	12	10	1
14	Albania	10	2	2	1	10	4	1	2	10
15	Romania	3	9	10	10	3	7	5	6	5
16	Georgia	6	8	3	4	12	6	2	3	8

Detailed voting results from Greece (Final)
R/O	Country	J. Nakassian	A. Karatzikos	H. Giannatsoulia	I. Koutsaftakis	M. Efstratiou	Jury Rank	Televote Rank	Combined Rank	Points
01	Slovenia	14	13	22	20	14	18	19	19	
02	France	4	6	25	26	20	16	21	20	
03	Israel	25	26	16	12	22	24	10	17	
04	Estonia	22	19	6	18	16	17	8	12	
05	United Kingdom	24	24	15	24	11	22	23	24	
06	Armenia	10	3	20	3	10	8	15	10	1
07	Lithuania	15	23	24	21	21	25	25	26	
08	Serbia	26	25	26	25	12	26	13	21	
09	Norway	16	20	23	14	13	20	20	22	
10	Sweden	2	18	5	11	9	7	7	7	4
11	Cyprus	9	2	2	1	4	2	3	2	10
12	Australia	5	11	3	5	6	4	9	6	5
13	Belgium	6	12	7	8	5	5	5	4	7
14	Austria	20	22	17	22	19	23	26	25	
15	Greece									
16	Montenegro	21	10	11	7	23	12	17	14	
17	Germany	19	17	18	23	7	19	24	23	
18	Poland	23	9	19	17	18	21	16	18	
19	Latvia	7	8	12	10	2	6	12	8	3
20	Romania	8	15	14	19	8	10	14	11	
21	Spain	13	21	8	13	17	14	11	13	
22	Hungary	11	14	13	16	15	11	22	16	
23	Georgia	12	16	10	9	25	13	6	9	2
24	Azerbaijan	17	7	21	6	24	15	18	15	
25	Russia	1	4	4	15	3	3	4	3	8
26	Albania	18	5	9	4	26	9	2	5	6
27	Italy	3	1	1	2	1	1	1	1	12
