= Melina Aslanidou =

Greek singer

Melina Aslanidou Μελίνα Ασλανίδου
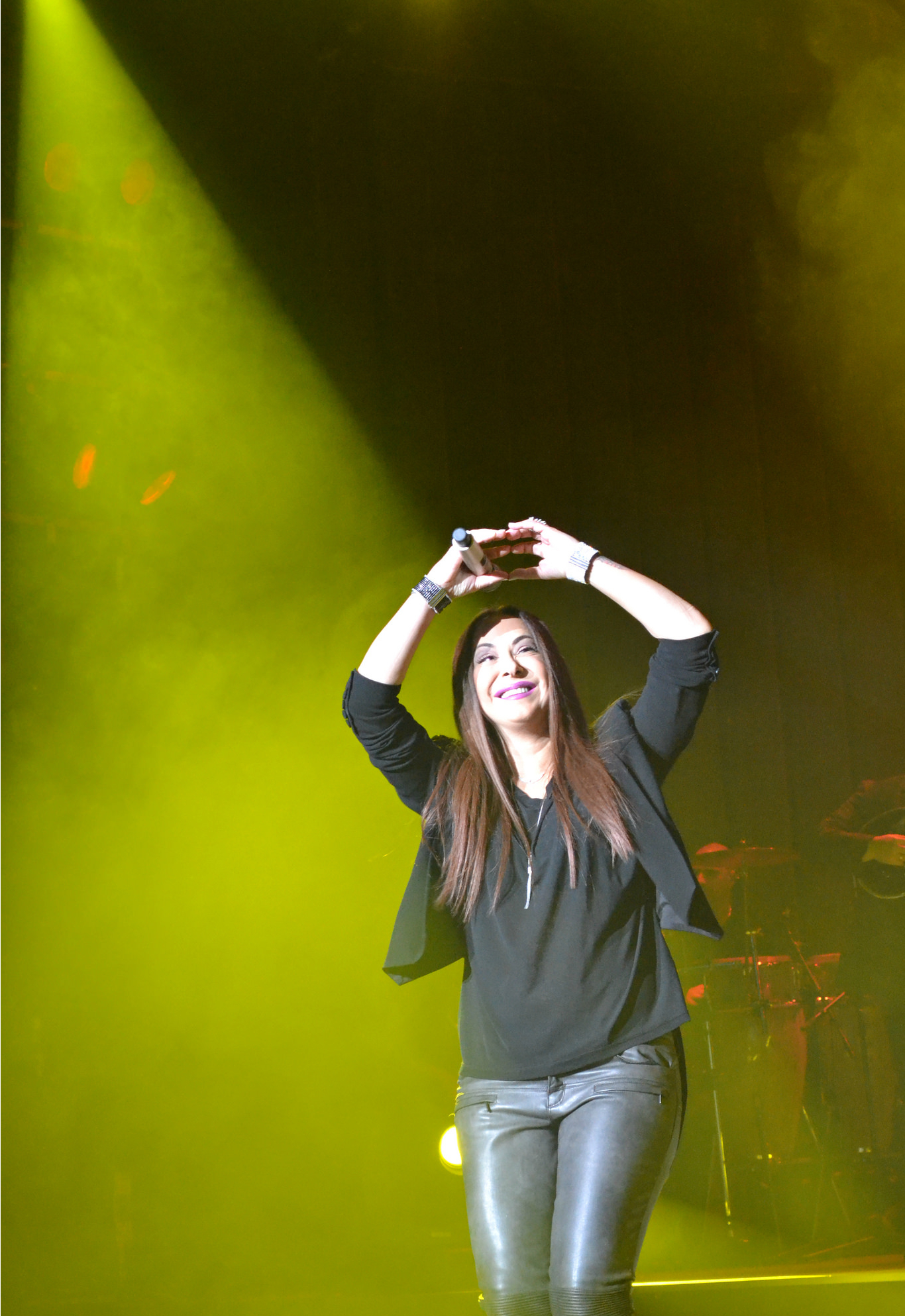
- Melina Aslanidou in 2015

Background information
- Born: 28 August 1974 (age 51); Stuttgart, West Germany
- Genres: Éntekhno; Laïko
- Occupation: Singer
- Years active: 2000–present
- Website: www.aslanidou.eu

Melina Aslanidou (Greek: Μελίνα Ασλανίδου; born 28 August 1974) is a Greek singer.

== Early life ==
Melina Aslanidou was born in Stuttgart, West Germany to Greek parents. Later, she moved with her family to Greece and grew up in Paralimni of Giannitsa, Greece.

== Career ==
From 2000 to 2002 she was a member of the band Oi Apenanti. She released an album with the band, in 2002, titled Mikri Agapi. Since then Aslanidou has been on a solo career. In 2003 she released her debut solo album, called To Perasma. Her second studio album Paihnidi Einai was released in 2005. In 2007, she released a CD single with three songs named "Psila Takounia" which were not included later in any studio album. In 2008 she released a compilation album titled Sto Dromo.

In 2014, she became a coach in the reality show of ANT1, The Voice of Greece.

== Discography ==
=== Studio albums ===
- 2002: Mikri Agapi (with Oi Apenanti)
- 2003: To Perasma
- 2005: Paihnidi Einai
- 2014: Melina
- 2016: Me Fonazoune Me To Mikro Mou
- 2018: Ximeroni Kiriaki

=== Live albums ===
- 2017: Live with Christos Nikolopoulos

=== Singles ===
- 2001: "To Parelthon Thimithika" (with Oi Apenanti)
- 2007: "Psila Takounia"
- 2010: "Alli Mia Fora" (Digital single only)
- 2012: "Den Exo Dieuthinsi"
- 2013: "Kalokairi Agkalia Mou"
- 2013: "Tetarti Vradi ft.Antonis Remos"
- 2014: "Ah Kindineuo!"
- 2014: "O Hronos Nika (OST for the movie "Koinos Paranomastis")"
- 2015: "Na Me Dikaiologiseis"
- 2015: "9 Mines (OST for the TV series "9 Mines")"
- 2016: "Prosopiki Epilogi"
- 2016: "Mes Sto Spiti De Menei Kaneis"
- 2017: "Me fonazoune Me To Mikro Mou (Petros Karras & DJ Piko Remix)"
- 2017: "An S' Arnitho Agapi Mou"
- 2017: "An S' Arnitho Agapi Mou (Remix)"
- 2018: "Den Ipame Tin Teleftea Leksi"
- 2019: "Se Poia Thalassa Armenizeis"
- 2019: "Eyhi"
- 2022: "I Melina Aslanidou Erminevi Giorgo Theofanous" (EP)

=== Compilations ===
- 2008: Sto Dromo
- 2015: "Best Of" (From Newspaper "Ependisi")
- 2016: Osa Eipa

== Awards and nominations ==
=== Arion Music Awards ===
Year	Recipient	Award	Result
2003	Nai Tha Po	Song of the Year	Nominated
2004	To Perasma	Best Laïko Song	Nominated
2004	To Perasma	Best New Artist	Nominated
2004	To Perasma	Best Entekhno Song	Nominated
2006	Pehnidi Ine	Best Entekhno Album	Nominated
2006	Pehnidi Ine	Best Entekhno Singer	Nominated
