= Colour Day Festival =

Summer festival in Greece

Colourday Festival
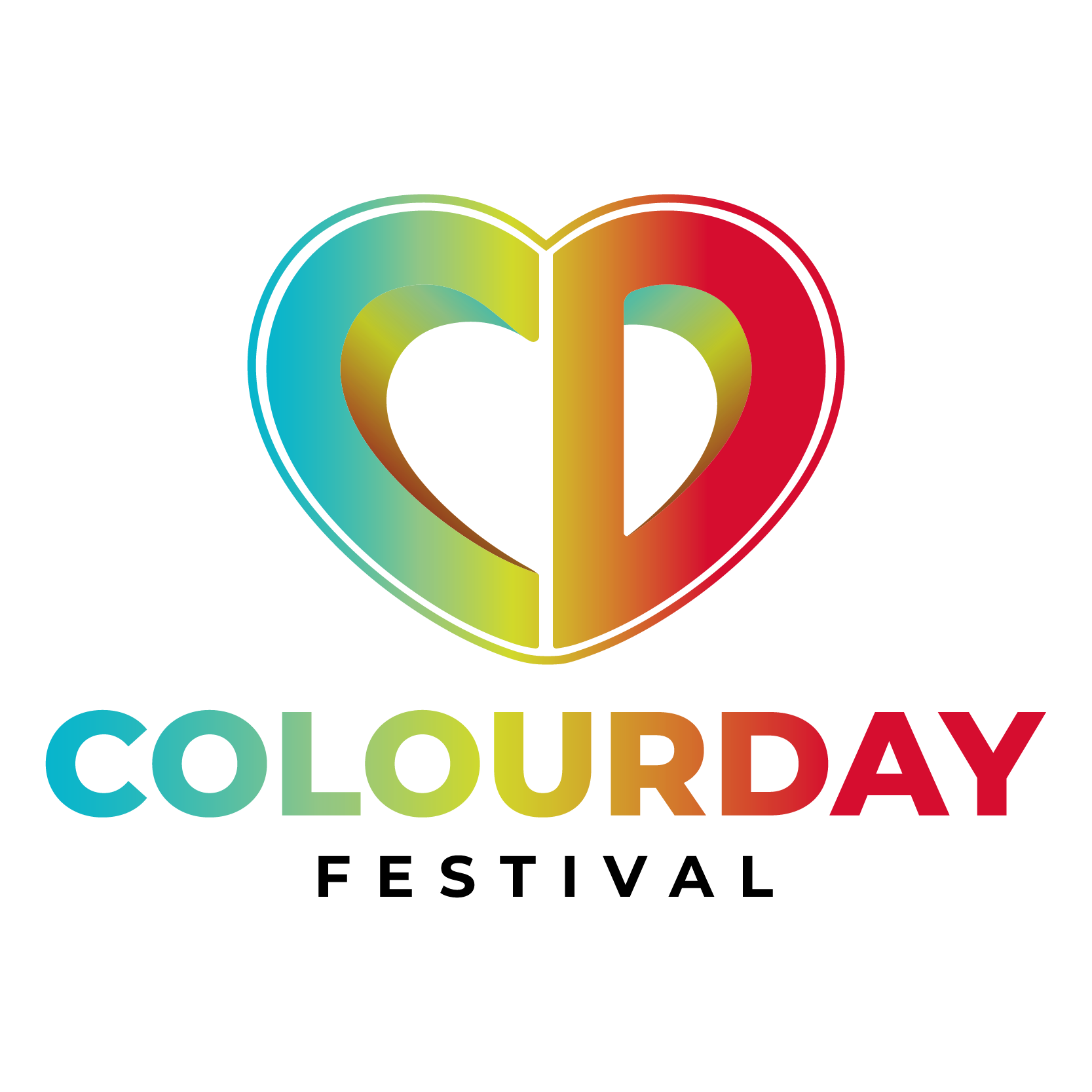
- Genre: Music Festival
- Frequency: Annually
- Venue: OAKA Stadium
- Locations: Greece, Albania, Cyprus, Kosovo
- Years active: 9
- Inaugurated: June 2015; Athens, Greece
- Most recent: 16 June 2024
- Attendance: 246.000
- Organiser: Skull Productions
- Website: colourdayfestival.com

Colourday Festival is a summer festival in Greece with music and coloured powder. It takes place on a weekend in June, from 12 noon to 11 pm. It is considered to be one of the most famous & largest festivals in Greece, with more than 246,000 attendees throughout the years, it is a very popular event within young audiences.

Recently the festival also expanded to Albania starting in 2018.

== Beginnings ==
Colourday Festival first took place in Athens on June 20, 2015, with more than 32,000 attendees. The Festival was held in OAKA Stadium where it continued to be held for the following years. During the Festival, there were three throwings of coloured power. At the end of the night, everyone is covered with colour. According to news.gr, more than 100,000 bags of colour were used at the first Colourday Festival.

== Growth ==
| Year | Date | Attendance | Lineup |
|---|---|---|---|
| 2015 | 20 June | 32.000 | MELISSES |
| 2016 | 18 June | 40.000 | MELISSES · THE MODE |
| 2017 | 17 June | 27.000 | HELENA PAPARIZOU · JENN MOREL · THE MODE · ONIRAMA · OTHERVIEW |
| 2018 | 30 June | 52.000 | SAKIS ROUVAS · TAMTA · REC · DUO VIOLINS · THE MODE · YIANNA TERZI · ARIS MAKRIS · YPOXTHONIOS ELVANA GJATA · MIKE · MATINA ZARA |
| 2018 | 1 July | 52.000 | IAN STRATIS · VANGELIS KAKOURIOTIS · OTHERVIEW · JOSEPHINE · THE PLAYERS · ANASTASIOS RAMMOS · IRATUS · ISAC ELLIOT · VEGAS · MIDENISTIS · ISSJAMES · COURTNEY PARKER |
| 2019 | 29 & 30 June | 46.000 | ELENI FOUREIRA · ERA ISTREFI · SIN BOY · REC · MIKOLAS JOSEF · KAZKA · SASKE · SOLMEISTER FT WNC · OTHERVIEW FT JOSEPHINE · THE PLAYERS · CLAYDEE · PRINCE KARMA · SLOGAN · MENTE FUERTE · GOIN' THROUGH FEAT · FAMILY · HAVANA · THE MODE · BOBITO FT LILA TRIANTI · STEVE · SHOWTIME PARTY |
| 2020 | Coronavirus | - | - |
| 2021 | Coronavirus | - | - |
| 2022 | 25 June | 21.000 | KONSTANTINOS ARGIROS · JOSEPHINE · FY · KINGS · ANASTASIA · CLAYDEE · MG · KONNIE METAXA · MENTE FUERTE · VLOSPA · NATASHA KAY · STEFANOS PITSINIAGAS · JOANNE · ILIAS BOGDANOS · STEVE · NASSAUCE · ASIMINA · MC DADDY · GREG · KG · DINAMISS · SIGMA · ELLIZE · SIDARTA · BOREK · ARVA · ALEX MANDI |
| 2023 | 18 June | 28.000 | DESPOINA VANDI · ANASTASIA · STAN · HAWK · KINGS · IMMUNE · IVAN GREKO · BOSSIKAN · ELLIZE · STRAT · DAPHNE LAWRENCE · ROI · KIDD · ASPA · JOANNE · RIPEN · LILA · ANTONIA KAOURI · ATHENA MANOUKIAN · BOREK FT KOSTAS · MARTAKIS · KONY · NINA · ARCHOLEKAS · IASONAS MANDILAS · VASILIS ELIADES · LIAK |

== How it works ==
=== Procedure ===
The festival begins at 12 noon. The first guests arrive and some local warm-up DJs are performing. Each of the acts plays for about 20–30 minutes. –2 hours. At 5 pm everyone comes together for the first simultaneous colour throw of the day. This is then repeated twice. At about 11pm the event is over and the music stops. The festival usually takes place on a Saturday. An after-movie video is produced after each event and onsite photo team follows each event, publishing pictures on the respective Facebook pages.

=== Setup ===
There is one large stage where the DJs or the artists perform. There are also kiosks for food and drinks and kiosks for medical care. The colour powder is provided with the ticket but can also be bought at the festival as well, along with various merchandise products, like T-shirts and hats.

== History ==
The festival was founded in 2015 by Skull Productions with attendance reaching over 32,000 attendees while marking its foot in the Greek Festival scene.

Throughout the following years Colourday Festival grew its audience and became a notable event within the community. The festivals' creativity and themes helped it become a staple to the Athenian summer recreation.

Following many years of its existence, the festival kept its touch with the younger audience by adapting to the teenagers' wishes of artists.

Right after the festivals' 2019 edition, COVID-19 struck and the festival was forced to cancel its plans for the next two years which cost the festival to doubt a huge return. Fortunately, after announcing the 2022 line-up everything seemed to be going well as the ticket count kept on rising even after two consecutive years without running.

In the end, the 2022 edition was a success which led to huge win for the festival. Although, once again disaster struck, and on the set day for the festival in 2023 there was a national 3-day bereavement. Colourday Festival was expecting over 70,000 attendees in 2023 as tickets were free, but the festival respected the mourning and decided to change the date to June 18. On that day the weather was extremely rainy, leading to many attendees thinking the festival would be cancelled and in result not showing up.
