= Vegas (band) =

Greek band formed in 2008

Vegas Band
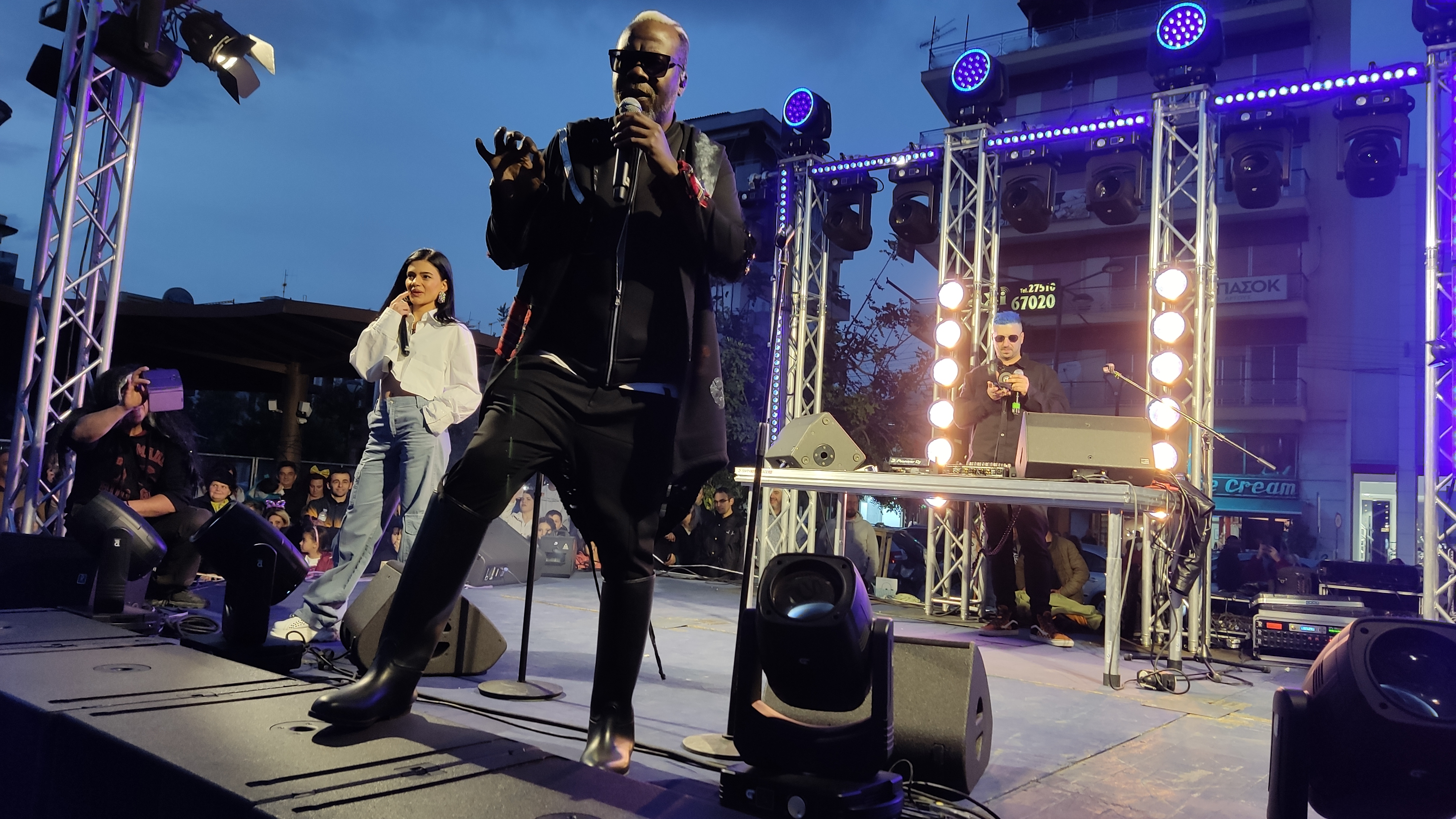

Background information
- Origin: Greece
- Genres: Rock, Jazz, Soul, Funk hip hop
- Years active: 2009–present
- Labels: Heaven Music (2008–2015); Cobalt Music (2015–2017); Spicy (2017–σήμερα)
- Members: ZeRaw; Melina Makris; DJ Airth
- Past members: Katerina
- Website: Official Website

VEGAS is a Greek group formed in 2008 and consists of three members: vocalists ZeRaw and Melina Makris, and DJ Airth on the consoles.

== Discography ==
=== Albums ===
- 2009: Vegas
- 2011: Season 2
- 2012: VEGAS...THE STORY SO FAR

=== Singles ===
- Hrthe i Stigmi (2010) (feat finalist of Greece's Next Top Model)
- Tous Ponaei (2009)
- Mi Stamatas (2010)
- Fsssst! Vegas! (2010)
- Tis Manas Sou (I Agkalia) (2009)
- De Tha Fygeis (2009)
- Fili (2010)
- You Killed Me (2010)
- Mad About You (2011)
- Gia sena (2011)
- Pio Psila (2012)
- Panta Kalokairi (2012)
- Prospatho (2012)
- Osa Eixa (2012)
- Akoma (2013)
- Xilies Fores (2013)
- Pedio Maxis (2014)
- Paidia tis Nixtas (2014)
- Solo (2015)
- Apopse (2015)
- Otan Me Filas (2018) / Music credits: Tim Aeby, Claydee, Zeraw, Sofia Papavasileiou

== Awards and nominations ==
=== Mad Video Music Awards ===
Year	Nominee / work	Award	Result
2010	Tous Ponaei	Video Clip Hip-Hop/Urban	Won
2010	Tous Ponaei	Mad Radio 106.2 Track of the Year	Nominated
2010	Tous Ponaei	Stixos-Ataka	Nominated
2010	Hrthe H Stigmi	Sexy Video Clip	Nominated
2010	Hrthe H Stigmi	Fashion Icon in Video-Clip	Nominated
2010	Vegas	Best New Artist	Nominated
2010	Vegas	Best Group	Nominated
2011	Mi Stamatas	Video Clip Hip-Hop/Urban	Nominated
2011	Mad About You(with Tomer G)	Best Collaboration	Nominated
2012	Gia Sena	Video of the Year	Nominated
2012	Gia Sena	Video Clip Hip-Hop/Urban	Nominated
2012	Fili	Fashion Icon in Video-Clip	Nominated
2012	Vegas	Group of the Year	Won
2012	Vegas	Artist of the Year	Nominated

=== MTV EMA ===
Year	Nominee / work	Award	Result
2010	Vegas	Best Greek Act	Nominated
2012	Vegas	Best Greek Act	Won
2012	Vegas	Best European Act	Nominated
