= Cyprus in the Eurovision Song Contest 2027 =

- Eurovision Song Contest 2027
- Participating broadcaster: Cyprus Broadcasting Corporation (CyBC)
- Country: Cyprus
- Selection process: Internal selection
- Announcement date: Artist: 4 November 2026

Competing entry
- Artist: George Perris

Participation chronology

Cyprus is set to be represented at the Eurovision Song Contest 2027. The Cypriot participating broadcaster, Cyprus Broadcasting Corporation (CyBC), internally selected its entry for the contest.

== Background ==
Prior to the 2027 contest, the Cyprus Broadcasting Corporation (CyBC) had participated in the Eurovision Song Contest representing Cyprus forty-two times since its debut in the 1981 contest. Its best result in the contest was second, achieved in 2018 with "Fuego" performed by Eleni Foureira. Before that, its best placing was fifth, achieved three times: in 1982 with the song "Mono i agapi" performed by Anna Vissi, in 1997 with "Mana mou" performed by Hara and Andreas Constantinou, and in 2004 with "Stronger Every Minute" performed by Lisa Andreas. Its least successful result was last place, achieved in 1986 with "Tora zo" by Elpida, receiving only four points in total; however, its worst finish in terms of points received was when it placed second to last in 1999 with "Tha'ne erotas" by Marlain Angelidou, receiving only two points. After returning to the contest in 2015 following a one-year absence due to the impact of the 2012–2013 Cypriot financial crisis and the broadcaster's budget restrictions, it has failed to qualify on two occasions, including in 2025, with "Shh" performed by Theo Evan. In 2026, Antigoni qualified for the final, eventually placing 19th out of the 25 entries.

As part of its duties as participating broadcaster, CyBC organises the selection of its entry in the Eurovision Song Contest and broadcasts the event in the country. It had used various methods to select its entry in the past, such as internal selections and televised national finals to choose the performer, song or both to compete at Eurovision. Since 2016, the broadcaster had opted to select the entry internally without input from the public. In September 2026, CyBC confirmed its intention to participate in the 2027 contest. On 4 November 2026, CyBC announced that the official cypriot song for the 2027 contest will be selected through a national final.

== Before Eurovision ==
=== Artist selection ===
On 4 November 2026, CyBC announced that Greek singer George Perris was internally selected to represent Cyprus in Burgas.

=== Song selection ===
On 4 November 2026, CyBC opened a submission period for interested songwriters to submit their applications. Songwriters could be of any nationality. The application deadline for the song submission will end on 13 December 2026. The result of the national final will be decided by a 50/50 split of professional jury voting and public voting.

== At Eurovision ==
The Eurovision Song Contest 2027 will take place at the Arena Burgas in Burgas, Bulgaria, and consist of two semi-finals held on the respective dates of 11 and 13 May and the final on 15 May 2026. All nations with the exception of the host country (Bulgaria) and the "Big Four" (France, Germany, Italy and the United Kingdom) will be required to qualify from one of two semi-finals in order to compete for the final; the top ten countries from each semi-final will progress to the final.
