= Cyprus in the Eurovision Song Contest 2025 =

- Eurovision Song Contest 2025
- Participating broadcaster: Cyprus Broadcasting Corporation (CyBC)
- Country: Cyprus
- Selection process: Internal selection
- Announcement date: Artist: 2 September 2024; Song: 11 March 2025

Competing entry
- Song: "Shh"
- Artist: Theo Evan
- Songwriters: Dimitris Kontopoulos; Elke Tiel; Elsa Søllesvik; Lasse Nymann; Linda Dale

Placement
- Semi-final result: Failed to qualify (11th)

Participation chronology

Cyprus was represented at the Eurovision Song Contest 2025 with the song "Shh", written by Dimitris Kontopoulos, Elke Tiel, Elsa Søllesvik, Lasse Nymann, and Linda Dale, and performed by Theo Evan. The Cypriot participating broadcaster, Cyprus Broadcasting Corporation (CyBC), internally selected its entry for the contest.

Cyprus was drawn to compete in the first semi-final which took place on 13 May 2025. Performing during the show in position 15, Cyprus was not announced among the top 10 entries of the first semi-final and therefore did not qualify to compete in the final. It was later revealed that Cyprus placed 11th out of the 15 participating countries in the semi-final with 44 points, missing the qualification by just 2 points.

== Background ==
Prior to the 2025 contest, the Cyprus Broadcasting Corporation (CyBC) had participated in the Eurovision Song Contest representing Cyprus forty times since its debut in the 1981 contest. Its best placing was at the 2018 contest where Eleni Foureira placed second with "Fuego". Before that, its best result was fifth, achieved three times: in the 1982 competition with the song "Mono i agapi" performed by Anna Vissi, in the 1997 edition with "Mana mou" performed by Hara and Andreas Constantinou, and the 2004 contest with "Stronger Every Minute" performed by Lisa Andreas. Its least successful result was in the 1986 contest when it placed last with the song "Tora zo" by Elpida, receiving only four points in total. However, its worst finish in terms of points received was when it placed second to last in the 1999 contest with "Tha'ne erotas" by Marlain Angelidou, receiving only two points. After returning to the contest in 2015 following its absence in the 2014 edition due to the 2012–13 Cypriot financial crisis and the broadcaster's budget restrictions, it has qualified for the final of all the contests except in 2022, when "Ela" performed by Andromache failed to advance from the semi-finals. In 2024, "Liar" performed by Silia Kapsis qualified for the final, where it ultimately placed 15th.

As part of its duties as participating broadcaster, CyBC organises the selection of its entry in the Eurovision Song Contest and broadcasts the event in the country. It had used various methods to select its entry in the past, such as internal selections and televised national finals to choose the performer, song or both to compete at Eurovision. Since 2016, the broadcaster had opted to select the entry internally without input from the public; in 2024, Fame Story, the Greek version of the talent show Star Academy, was initially announced as the Cypriot national final, however, the plans were later abandoned due to a dispute with the Greek broadcaster Hellenic Broadcasting Corporation (ERT).

== Before Eurovision ==
=== Internal selection ===
In July 2024, it was reported that the search for the Cypriot representative for the 2025 contest was underway, and that CyBC intended to select an entrant who – unlike the country's representatives in 2023 (Andrew Lambrou) and 2024 (Silia Kapsis) – was based in Cyprus. The selection was to be carried out by a focus group composed of music professionals and Eurovision experts. By late August 2024, the artist and song had reportedly been selected, with the entrant, Theo Evan, announced on 2 September. The song, titled "Shh", was released on 11 March; it was written by Dimitris Kontopoulos, Elke Tiel, Elsie Bay, Lasse Nymann, and Linda Dale.

== At Eurovision ==
=== Voting ===
==== Points awarded to Cyprus ====
Points awarded to Cyprus (Semi-final 1)
Points	Televote
12 points	Albania; Azerbaijan
10 points	Slovenia
8 points	
7 points	
6 points	
5 points	Portugal; San Marino (Note: San Marino uses a jury in the semi-finals.)
4 points	
3 points	
2 points	
1 point	

==== Points awarded by Cyprus ====
Points awarded by Cyprus (Semi-final 1)
Points	Televote
12 points	Ukraine
10 points	Netherlands
8 points	Estonia
7 points	Iceland
6 points	Norway
5 points	Sweden
4 points	Poland
3 points	Albania
2 points	San Marino
1 point	Slovenia

Points awarded by Cyprus (Final)
Points	Televote	Jury
12 points	Greece	Greece
10 points	Israel	France
8 points	Ukraine	Netherlands
7 points	Estonia	Austria
6 points	Austria	Switzerland
5 points	Norway	Israel
4 points	Poland	Albania
3 points	France	Italy
2 points	Armenia	Sweden
1 point	Netherlands	San Marino

==== Detailed voting results ====
Each participating broadcaster assembles a five-member jury panel consisting of music industry professionals who are citizens of the country they represent. Each jury, and individual jury member, is required to meet a strict set of criteria regarding professional background, as well as diversity in gender and age. No member of a national jury was permitted to be related in any way to any of the competing acts in such a way that they cannot vote impartially and independently. The individual rankings of each jury member as well as the nation's televoting results were released shortly after the grand final.

The following members comprised the Cypriot jury:

- Charis Savva
- Michael Messios
- Chariklia Strouthou
- Helena Olympiou
- Maria Hari

Detailed voting results from Cyprus (Semi-final 1)
R/O	Country	Televote	
R/O	Country	Rank	Points
01	Iceland	4	7
02	Poland	7	4
03	Slovenia	10	1
04	Estonia	3	8
05	Ukraine	1	12
06	Sweden	6	5
07	Portugal	11	
08	Norway	5	6
09	Belgium	13	
10	Azerbaijan	14	
11	San Marino	9	2
12	Albania	8	3
13	Netherlands	2	10
14	Croatia	12	
15	Cyprus		

Detailed voting results from Cyprus (Final)
R/O	Country	Jury							Televote	
R/O	Country	Juror A	Juror B	Juror C	Juror D	Juror E	Rank	Points	Rank	Points
01	Norway	18	17	18	15	16	22		6	5
02	Luxembourg	14	15	7	13	21	12		21	
03	Estonia	12	16	20	14	10	16		4	7
04	Israel	9	6	6	4	26	6	5	2	10
05	Lithuania	21	18	21	22	15	24		14	
06	Spain	22	8	19	12	13	13		17	
07	Ukraine	20	25	13	25	18	23		3	8
08	United Kingdom	23	24	26	9	17	21		22	
09	Austria	11	2	4	6	3	4	7	5	6
10	Iceland	24	11	12	21	12	17		20	
11	Latvia	17	21	17	18	25	25		19	
12	Netherlands	4	7	3	3	6	3	8	10	1
13	Finland	15	10	22	20	9	15		15	
14	Italy	6	12	11	8	7	8	3	12	
15	Poland	26	19	25	26	19	26		7	4
16	Germany	25	22	9	23	11	18		13	
17	Greece	1	1	1	1	1	1	12	1	12
18	Armenia	8	9	24	24	23	14		9	2
19	Switzerland	3	13	5	5	4	5	6	24	
20	Malta	19	14	15	17	14	20		16	
21	Portugal	13	26	10	7	20	11		23	
22	Denmark	16	20	14	10	24	19		26	
23	Sweden	7	23	8	11	8	9	2	11	
24	France	2	3	2	2	2	2	10	8	3
25	San Marino	10	4	16	19	22	10	1	25	
26	Albania	5	5	23	16	5	7	4	18	
