= Theo Evan =

Greek Cypriot singer

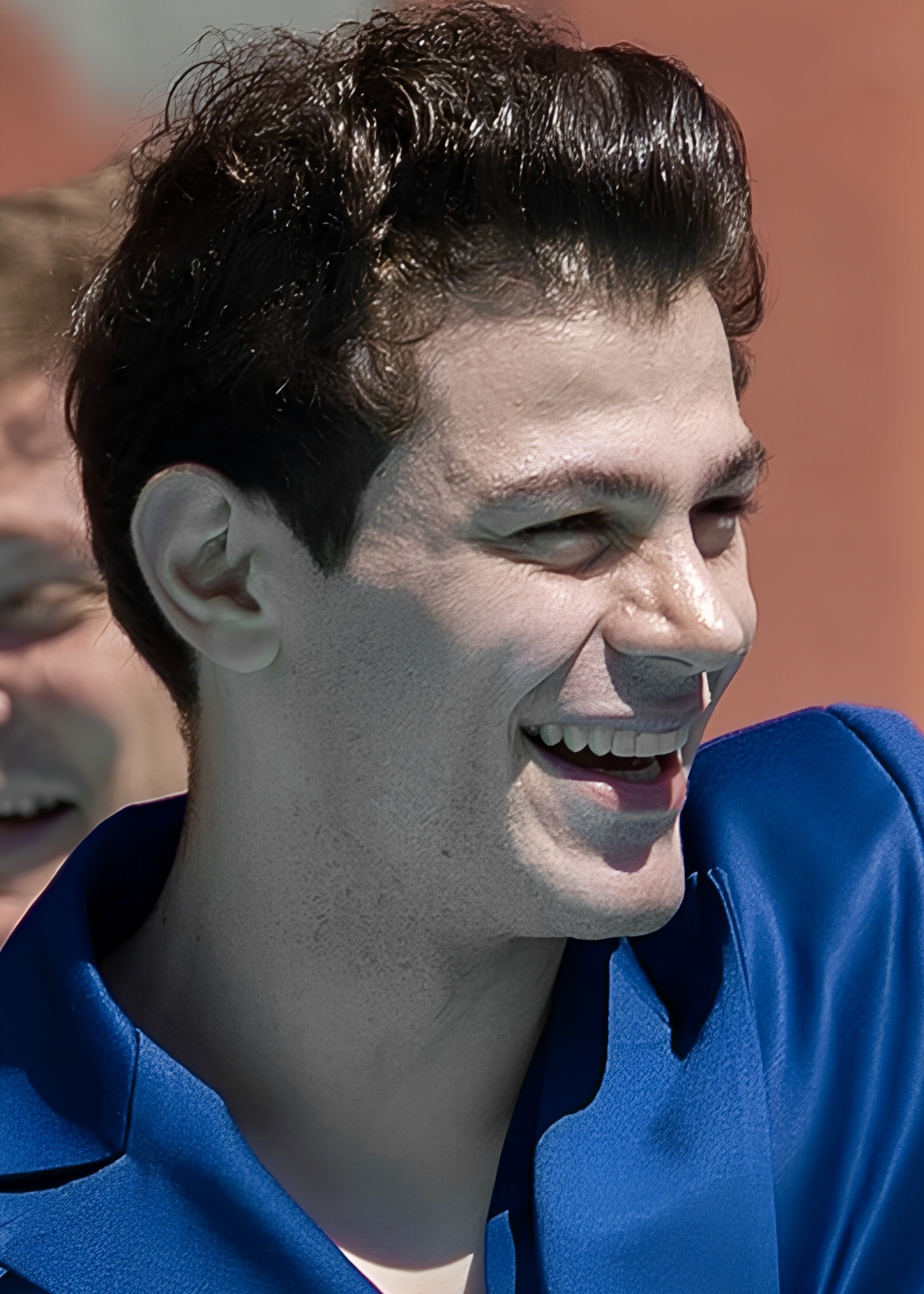
- Theo Evan in 2025

Background information
- Born: Evangelos Theodorou; 16 May 2000 (age 26); Nicosia, Cyprus
- Genres: Pop; reggaeton; EDM
- Occupations: Singer; songwriter; dancer; actor
- Instrument: Vocals
- Years active: 2021–present

Evangelos Theodorou (Greek: Ευάγγελος Θεοδώρου), known professionally as Theo Evan, is a Greek Cypriot singer-songwriter, dancer, and actor. He represented Cyprus in the Eurovision Song Contest 2025 with the song "Shh".

== Life and career ==
Born in Nicosia to a Greek-Cypriot family, Evan began performing at an early age, participating in school choir and dance activities. He started singing and dancing at the age of seven, and began writing songs during his teenage years. He also took part in various theatre productions and talent shows across Cyprus, often earning awards and distinctions for his efforts.

After graduating from The English School in Nicosia, Evan moved to the United States to study music and performance at Berklee College of Music in Boston, Massachusetts, which he later graduated with honors. Since then, he has been invited back as an honorary guest at the university’s graduation ceremony on three occasions, alongside other artists such as Missy Elliott, Pharrell Williams, John Legend, and Justin Timberlake.

In 2021, he released his debut single "The Wall". Evan also made an appearance as an extra in the seventh episode of the second season of the American television series Euphoria. After a short stay in Los Angeles, he returned to his hometown to continue his music career.

On 2 September 2024, it was announced that he would represent Cyprus at the Eurovision Song Contest 2025 in Basel, Switzerland. This marked the first time since 2017 that Cyprus was represented by a Cypriot-born artist. On 13 May 2025, Evan performed in the first semifinal, where he failed to qualify to the grand final, placing 11th with 44 points, missing the final by 2 points.

== Artistry ==
Evan's artistry is described as "inspired by everything from Stromae to Michael Jackson to reggaeton". His music style is further described as a "mainstream blend of Mediterranean pop, infused with dark and gritty tones, complemented by a fresh, contemporary pop fusion".

== Discography ==
=== Singles ===
Title	Year	Album or EP
"The Wall"	2021	Non-album singles
"So Cold"	2022	Non-album singles
"Burn Us Down"	2022	Non-album singles
"Save Me from Myself"	2023	Non-album singles
"Dark Side"	2023	Non-album singles
"The Cost of Losing You"	2024	Non-album singles
"Fading Dreams"	2024	Non-album singles
"Fuego"	2025	Non-album singles
"Shh"	2025	Non-album singles
"Diafanis" (with Demy)	2025	Delta
"Don't Kill My Summer"	2025	Non-album singles
"Better Days"	2025	Non-album singles
"Pesto"	2026	Non-album singles

== Awards and nominations ==
Year	Award	Category	Nominee(s)	Result	Ref.
2025	Eurovision Awards	Non-Qualifying Show-Stopper	Himself	Nominated	

Awards and achievements
Preceded by Silia Kapsis with "Liar"	Cyprus in the Eurovision Song Contest; 2025	Succeeded by Antigoni with "Jalla"
