= Cyprus in the Eurovision Song Contest =

- Eurovision Song Contest
- Participating broadcaster: Cyprus Broadcasting Corporation (CyBC)

Participation summary
- Appearances: 42 (34 finals)
- First appearance: 1981
- Highest placement: 2nd: 2018
- Participation history: 1981; 1982; 1983; 1984; 1985; 1986; 1987; ~~1988~~; 1989; 1990; 1991; 1992; 1993; 1994; 1995; 1996; 1997; 1998; 1999; 2000; 2001; 2002; 2003; 2004; 2005; 2006; 2007; 2008; 2009; 2010; 2011; 2012; 2013; 2014; 2015; 2016; 2017; 2018; 2019; ~~2020~~; 2021; 2022; 2023; 2024; 2025; 2026; 2027
- Cyprus's page at Eurovision.com
- For the most recent participation see Cyprus in the Eurovision Song Contest 2026

Cyprus has been represented at the Eurovision Song Contest 42 times since its debut in 1981. The Cypriot participating broadcaster in the contest is the Cyprus Broadcasting Corporation (CyBC). Its first entry was "Monika" performed by the group Island, which finished sixth. The country's best result is a second-place finish with "Fuego" by Eleni Foureira in 2018. Cyprus holds the record for having competed in the most editions of the contest without ever winning.

Between 2006 and 2013, Cyprus failed to qualify from the semi-final round six times before withdrawing in 2014. On 14 July 2014, CyBC officially confirmed its return to the contest for 2015, and qualified for the final every year until 2022, when it did not qualify. Cyprus returned to the final again in 2023 and 2024, but failed to qualify once more in 2025, before qualifying again in 2026.

== Participation ==
The Cyprus Broadcasting Corporation (CyBC) is a full member of the European Broadcasting Union (EBU), and thus is eligible to participate in the Eurovision Song Contest. It has participated in the contest representing Cyprus since its 26th edition in 1981.

== History ==
Since its first entry, CyBC has participated every year except for 1988, 2001, and 2014. In 1988, CyBC withdrew its entry after it determined that the intended entry was ineligible; the song had been presented to jurors (but not selected) in the 1984 internal selection process, which was a violation of their selection rules. In 2001, the country did not qualify for the contest due to insufficiently high average scores in previous contests, according to the qualification process at the time. In 2014, the broadcaster decided to not participate in the contest and cited public indifference, public opinion regarding the 2012–13 Cypriot financial crisis, and related budget restrictions as factors for not taking part. On 14 July 2014, CyBC officially confirmed their return to the contest in 2015. Cyprus hosted the Eurovision Song Project, which included 2 semi-finals, 1 second chance round and a final.

Since its return in 2015, Cyprus has only failed to qualify twice, those being in 2022 and 2025, and even reached its best result with "Fuego" by Eleni Foureira coming second in 2018. Cyprus holds the record for most editions competing in the contest without a single win to date. Most of the Cypriot entries have been sung in Greek or English; the exceptions are in 2000, in which the song "Nomiza" included both Greek and Italian, and in 2007, in which "Comme ci, comme ça" by Evridiki was entirely in French. Additionally, in both 2018 and 2021, the songs had some phrases in Spanish, for 2026 which had English and Greek in the language for "Jalla" by Antigoni, it contains the Cypriot Greek dialect which was the first time that the dialect was used in an Eurovision Song and by Cyprus itself.

=== Voting ===
Cyprus's exchange of the maximum 12 points with Greece has occurred regularly in the contest, which is often met with derision from the audience. In the 32 instances (1981–2025) of Cyprus being able to vote for Greece in a final, it has voted Greece as having the best song on 27 of them (the exceptions being 1981, 1985, 1990, 1991, 2015 and 2024). Since the introduction of televoting in 1998, the two countries have consistently given each other the maximum 12 points except in 2015, when neither country gave their 12 points to the other, but both gave their maximum points to Italy.

Cyprus and Turkey never exchanged votes until 2003, a taboo attributed to the Cyprus dispute.

=== Popularity of the contest ===
Since its first entry in 1981, Cyprus has had a mixture of varied results. The best result achieved so far is a second place, reached by Eleni Foureira at the 2018 contest.

In the 1980s and 1990s, Cyprus managed to reach the top 10 a number of times, something which made the Contest popular with the Cypriot public. Since 2004, Cyprus' performance has dropped notably. From 2006 to 2009 and again in 2011 and 2013, the country failed to reach the final.

At the same time when Cyprus' performance in the contest dropped vertically, Greece's performance improved very fast by one win and seven top ten results in one decade. This created a shift of interest, with the Cypriot public being more interested in the success of the Greek entry. This is probably because Greece, since 2004, seems to send very popular singers that have a well established fan-club in Cyprus, while Cyprus usually elects their contestants through an open talent contest, which often results in somewhat unknown artists representing the country.

== Participation overview ==
Table key
2	Second place
◁	Last place
◇	Entry selected but did not compete

Year	Artist	Song	Language	Final	Points	Semi	Points
1981	Island	"Monika" (Μόνικα)	Greek	6	69	No semi-finals	
1982	Anna Vissi	"Mono i agapi" (Μόνο η αγάπη)	Greek	5	85	No semi-finals	
1983	Stavros and Constantina	"I agapi akoma zi" (Η αγάπη ακόμα ζει)	Greek	16	26	No semi-finals	
1984	Andy Paul	"Anna Mari-Elena" (Άννα Μαρί-Έλενα)	Greek	15	31	No semi-finals	
1985	Lia Vissi	"To katalava arga" (Το κατάλαβα αργά)	Greek	16	15	No semi-finals	
1986	Elpida	"Tora zo" (Τώρα ζω)	Greek	20 ◁	4	No semi-finals	
1987	Alexia	"Aspro mavro" (Άσπρο μαύρο)	Greek	7	80	No semi-finals	
1988	Yiannis Dimitrou ◇	"Thimame" (Θυμάμαι) ◇	Greek ◇	Withdrawn		No semi-finals	
1989	Fanny Polymeri and Yiannis Savvidakis	"Apopse as vrethoume" (Απόψε ας βρεθούμε)	Greek	11	51	No semi-finals	
1990	Anastazio	"Milas poli" (Μιλάς πολύ)	Greek	14	36	No semi-finals	
1991	Elena Patroklou	"S.O.S."	Greek	9	60	No semi-finals	
1992	Evridiki	"Teriazoume" (Ταιριάζουμε)	Greek	11	57	No semi-finals	
1993	Zymboulakis and Van Beke	"Mi stamatas" (Μη σταματάς)	Greek	19	17	Kvalifikacija za Millstreet	
1994	Evridiki	"Ime anthropos ki ego" (Είμαι άνθρωπος κι εγώ)	Greek	11	51	No semi-finals	
1995	Alexandros Panayi	"Sti fotia" (Στη φωτιά)	Greek	9	79	No semi-finals	
1996	Constantinos	"Mono gia mas" (Μόνο για μας)	Greek	9	72	15	42
1997	Hara and Andreas Konstantinou	"Mana mou" (Μάνα μου)	Greek	5	98	No semi-finals	
1998	Michael Hajiyanni	"Genesis" (Γένεσις)	Greek	11	37	No semi-finals	
1999	Marlain	"Tha'ne erotas" (Θα'ναι έρωτας)	Greek	22	2	No semi-finals	
2000	Voice	"Nomiza" (Νόμιζα)	Greek, Italian	21	8	No semi-finals	
2002	One	"Gimme"	English	6	85	No semi-finals	
2003	Stelios Constantas	"Feeling Alive"	English	20	15	No semi-finals	
2004	Lisa Andreas	"Stronger Every Minute"	English	5	170	5	149
2005	Constantinos Christoforou	"Ela Ela"	English	18	46	Top 12 in 2004 final (Note: According to the then-Eurovision rules, the top ten non-Big Four countries from the previous year along with the Big Four automatically qualified for the Grand Final without having to compete in semi-finals. For example, if Germany and France placed inside the top ten, the 11th and 12th spots were advanced to next year's Grand Final along with all countries ranked in the top ten.)	
2006	Annet Artani	"Why Angels Cry"	English	Failed to qualify		15	57
2007	Evridiki	"Comme ci, comme ça"	French	Failed to qualify		15	65
2008	Evdokia Kadi	"Femme Fatale"	Greek	Failed to qualify		15	36
2009	Christina Metaxa	"Firefly"	English	Failed to qualify		14	32
2010	Jon Lilygreen and the Islanders	"Life Looks Better in Spring"	English	21	27	10	67
2011	Christos Mylordos	"San aggelos s'agapisa" (Σαν άγγελος σ'αγάπησα)	Greek	Failed to qualify		18	16
2012	Ivi Adamou	"La La Love"	English	16	65	7	91
2013	Despina Olympiou	"An me thimasai" (Aν με θυμάσαι)	Greek	Failed to qualify		15	11
2015	John Karayiannis	"One Thing I Should Have Done"	English	22	11	6	87
2016	Minus One	"Alter Ego"	English	21	96	8	164
2017	Hovig	"Gravity"	English	21	68	5	164
2018	Eleni Foureira	"Fuego"	English	2	436	2	262
2019	Tamta	"Replay"	English	13	109	9	149
2020	Sandro ◇	"Running" ◇	English ◇	Contest cancelled (Note: The 2020 contest was cancelled due to the COVID-19 pandemic.)			
2021	Elena Tsagrinou	"El Diablo"	English	16	94	6	170
2022	Andromache	"Ela" (Έλα)	English, Greek	Failed to qualify		12	63
2023	Andrew Lambrou	"Break a Broken Heart"	English	12	126	7	94
2024	Silia Kapsis	"Liar"	English	15	78	6	67
2025	Theo Evan	"Shh"	English	Failed to qualify		11	44
2026	Antigoni	"Jalla" (Κι άλλα)	English, Greek	19	75	10	122
2027	George Perris	Confirmed intention to participate †					

== Awards ==
=== Marcel Bezençon Awards ===
Year	Category	Song	Composer(s) lyrics (l) / music (m)	Performer	Final	Points	Host city	Ref.
2004	Composer Award	"Stronger Every Minute"	Mike Konnaris (m & l)	Lisa Andreas	5	170	(Turkey) Istanbul	
2018	Artistic Award (Note: Voted by previous winners.)	"Fuego"	Alex Papaconstantinou, Geraldo Sandell, Viktor Svensson, Anderz Wrethov Didrick	Eleni Foureira	2	436	(Portugal) Lisbon	

== Related involvement ==
=== Conductors ===
Year	Conductor (Note: All conductors are of Greek-Cypriot nationality unless otherwise noted.)	Notes	Ref.
1981	(Greece) Michael Rozakis		
1982	(United Kingdom) Martyn Ford		
1983	(Greece) Michael Rozakis		
1984	(Luxembourg) Pierre Cao	(Note: Host conductor; according to performer Andy Paul, he originally intended to have co-arranger Les Vandyke conduct the entry, only for CyBC to refuse to pay his fee.)	
1985	(Greece) Charis Andreadis	(Note: Also conducted the Greek entry.)	
1986	(United Kingdom) Martyn Ford		
1987	(Belgium) Jo Carlier	(Note: Host conductor)	
1988	(Australia) John Themis	(Note: Prior to "Thimame"'s disqualification, the intention was to have Themis conduct and, additionally, play the guitar solo.)	
1989	(Greece) Charis Andreadis		
1990	(Socialist Federal Republic of Yugoslavia) Stanko Selak	(Note: Host conductor; several television commentators erroneously stated that the song's composer and co-arranger, John Vickers, was the conductor. He was one of the backing musicians at the Eurovision final.)	
1991	(Bulgaria) Alexander Kirov Zografov		
1992	George Theofanous		
1993	George Theofanous		
1994	George Theofanous		
1995	George Theofanous		
1996	Stavros Lantsias		
1997	Stavros Lantsias		
1998	Costas Cacogiannis		

=== Heads of delegation ===
Each participating broadcaster in the Eurovision Song Contest assigns a head of delegation as the EBU's contact person and the leader of their delegation at the event. The delegation, whose size can greatly vary, includes a head of press, the contestants, songwriters, composers and backing vocalists, among others.

Year	Head of delegation	Ref.
1999	Marios Skordis	
2003	Marios Skordis	
2005	Tasos Trifonos	
2007–2026	Evi Papamichael	

=== Commentators and spokespersons ===
Year	Television commentator	Radio commentator	Spokesperson	Ref.
1974	Unknown		Did not participate	
1975 – 1980	No broadcast		Did not participate	
1981	Fryni Papadopoulou	Neophytos Taliotis	Anna Partelidou	
1982	Fryni Papadopoulou	Neophytos Taliotis	Anna Partelidou	
1983	Fryni Papadopoulou	Neophytos Taliotis	Anna Partelidou	
1984	Pavlos Pavlou	Neophytos Taliotis	Anna Partelidou	
1985	Themis Themistokleous	Neophytos Taliotis	Anna Partelidou	
1986	Themis Themistokleous	Fryni Papadopoulou	Anna Partelidou	
1987	Themis Themistokleous	Fryni Papadopoulou	Anna Partelidou	
1988	Daphne Bokota (for ERT and RIK)	No radio broadcast	Did not participate	
1989	Neophytos Taliotis	Pavlos Pavlou	Anna Partelidou	
1990	Neophytos Taliotis	Pavlos Pavlou	Anna Partelidou	
1991	Evi Papamichael	Pavlos Pavlou	Anna Partelidou	
1992	Evi Papamichael	Pavlos Pavlou	Anna Partelidou	
1993	Evi Papamichael	Pavlos Pavlou	Anna Partelidou	
1994	Evi Papamichael	Pavlos Pavlou	Anna Partelidou	
1995	Evi Papamichael	Pavlos Pavlou	Andreas Iakovidis	
1996	Evi Papamichael	Pavlos Pavlou	Marios Skordis	
1997	Evi Papamichael	Pavlos Pavlou	Marios Skordis	
1998	Evi Papamichael	Pavlos Pavlou	Marina Maleni	
1999	Evi Papamichael	Pavlos Pavlou	Marina Maleni	
2000	Evi Papamichael	Pavlos Pavlou	Loukas Hamatsos	
2001	Evi Papamichael	No radio broadcast	Did not participate	
2002	Evi Papamichael	Pavlos Pavlou	Melani Steliou	
2003	Evi Papamichael	Pavlos Pavlou	Loukas Hamatsos	
2004	Evi Papamichael	No radio broadcast	Loukas Hamatsos	
2005	Evi Papamichael	No radio broadcast	Melani Steliou	
2006	Evi Papamichael	No radio broadcast	Constantinos Christoforou	
2007	Vaso Komninou	No radio broadcast	Giannis Haralambous	
2008	Melina Karageorgiou	No radio broadcast	Hristina Marouhou	
2009	Melina Karageorgiou	Nathan Morley	Sophia Paraskeva	
2010	Melina Karageorgiou	Nathan Morley	Christina Metaxa	
2011	Melina Karageorgiou	No radio broadcast	Loukas Hamatsos	
2012	Melina Karageorgiou	No radio broadcast	Loukas Hamatsos	
2013	Melina Karageorgiou	Melina Karageorgiou	Loukas Hamatsos	
2014	Melina Karageorgiou	No radio broadcast	Did not participate	
2015	Melina Karageorgiou	Melina Karageorgiou	Loukas Hamatsos	
2016	Melina Karageorgiou	Melina Karageorgiou	Loukas Hamatsos	
2017	Tasos Tryfonos and Christiana Artemiou	Tasos Tryfonos and Christiana Artemiou	John Karayiannis	
2018	Costas Constantinou and Vaso Komninou	No radio broadcast	Hovig	
2019	Evridiki and Tasos Trifonos	No radio broadcast	Hovig	
2021	Louis Patsalides	No radio broadcast	Loukas Hamatsos	
2022	Melina Karageorgiou and Alexandros Taramountas	No radio broadcast	Loukas Hamatsos	
2023	Melina Karageorgiou and Alexandros Taramountas	No radio broadcast	Loukas Hamatsos	
2024	Melina Karageorgiou and Hovig	No radio broadcast	Loukas Hamatsos	
2025	Melina Karageorgiou and Alexandros Taramountas	Commentators unknown	Loukas Hamatsos	
2026	Melina Karageorgiou	No radio broadcast	Loukas Hamatsos	

=== Stage directors ===
Year	Stage director	Ref.
2005	Fotis Nikolaou	
2008	Fotis Nikolaou	
2009	Fotis Nikolaou	
2011	Fotis Nikolaou	
2012	Apollon Papatheoharis	
2013	Maria Liraraki	
2016	Sacha Jean-Baptiste	
2017	Charis Savva	
2018	Sacha Jean-Baptiste	
2019	Sacha Jean-Baptiste	
~~2020~~	~~Marvin Dietmann~~	
2021	Marvin Dietmann	
2022	Marvin Dietmann and Dan Shipton	
2023	Marvin Dietmann and Ross Nicholson	
2025	Sergio Jaén	

=== Costume designers ===
Year	Costume designers	Ref.
2005	Doukas Hatzidoukas	
2006	Marios Savvidis	
2013	Dionisis Kolpodinos	
2016	Andreas Zannetidis	
2018	Vrettos Vrettakos	
2019	Alexandre Katsaiti	
2021	Celia Kritharioti	
2022	Stelios Koudounaris	

== Photo gallery ==
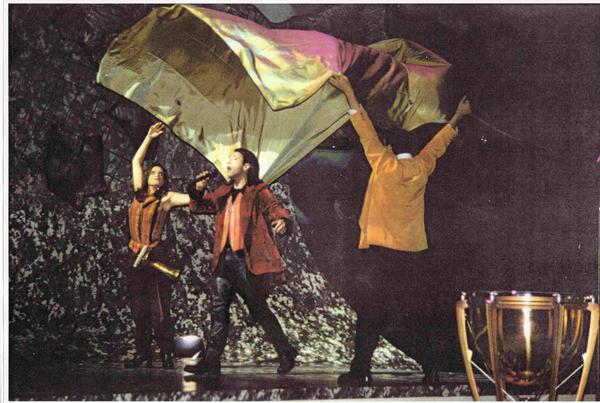
Alex Panayi in Dublin (1995)

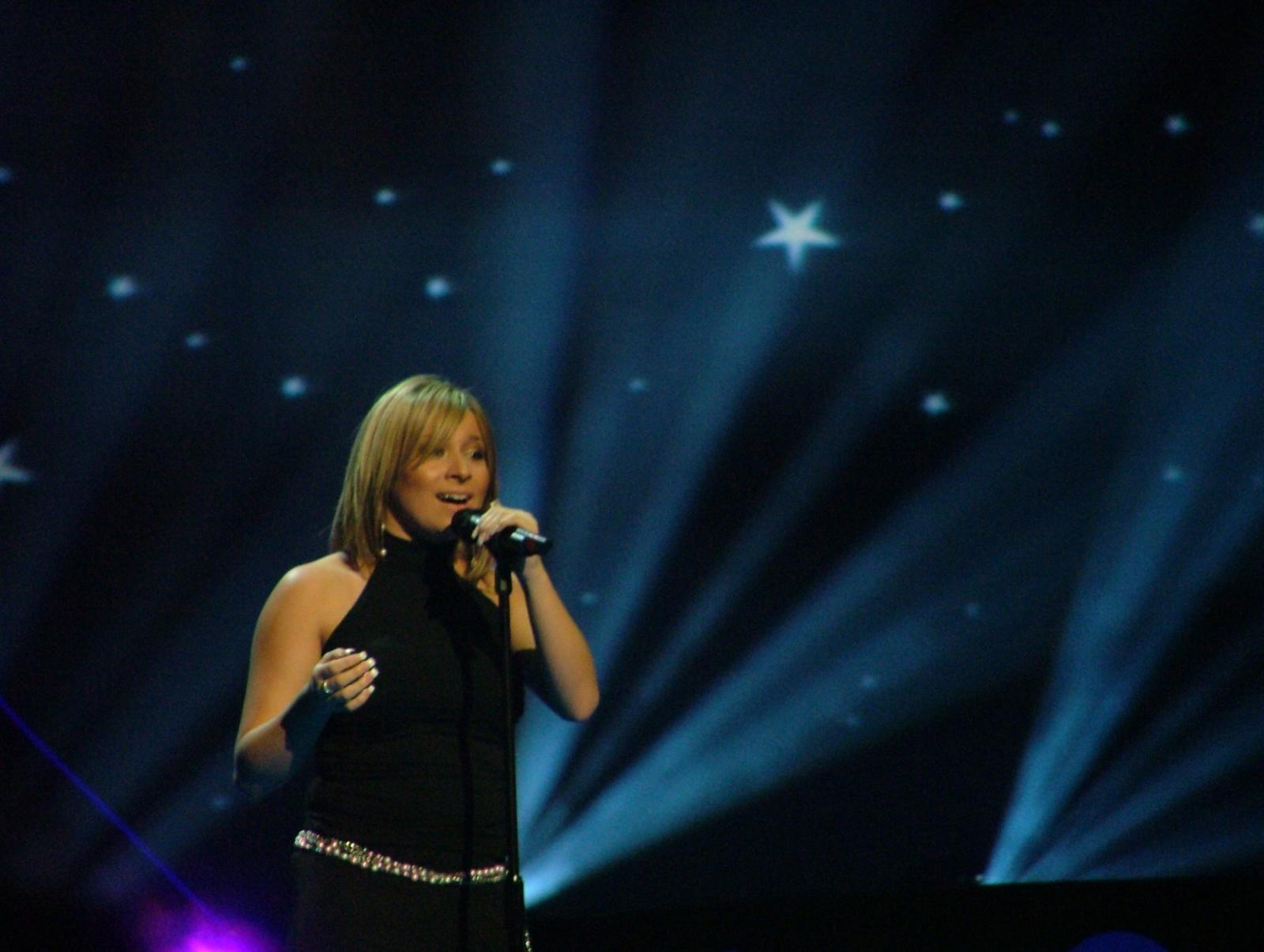
Lisa Andreas in Istanbul (2004)

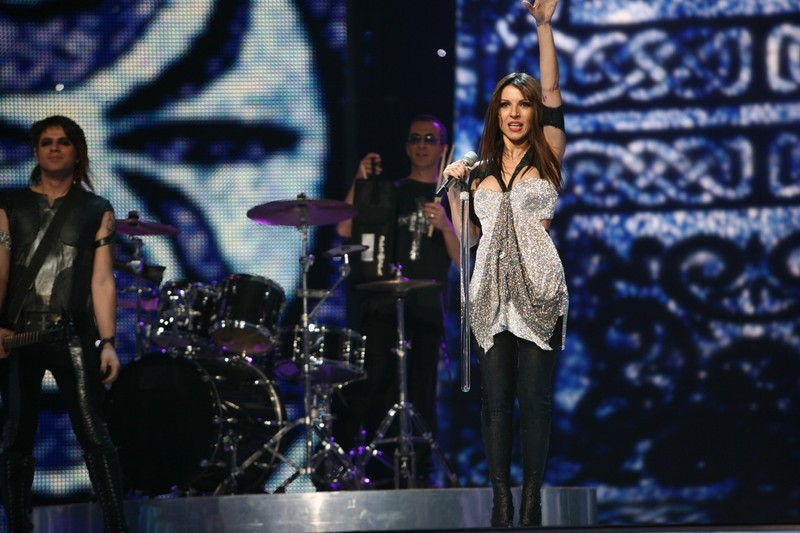
Evridiki in Helsinki (2007)

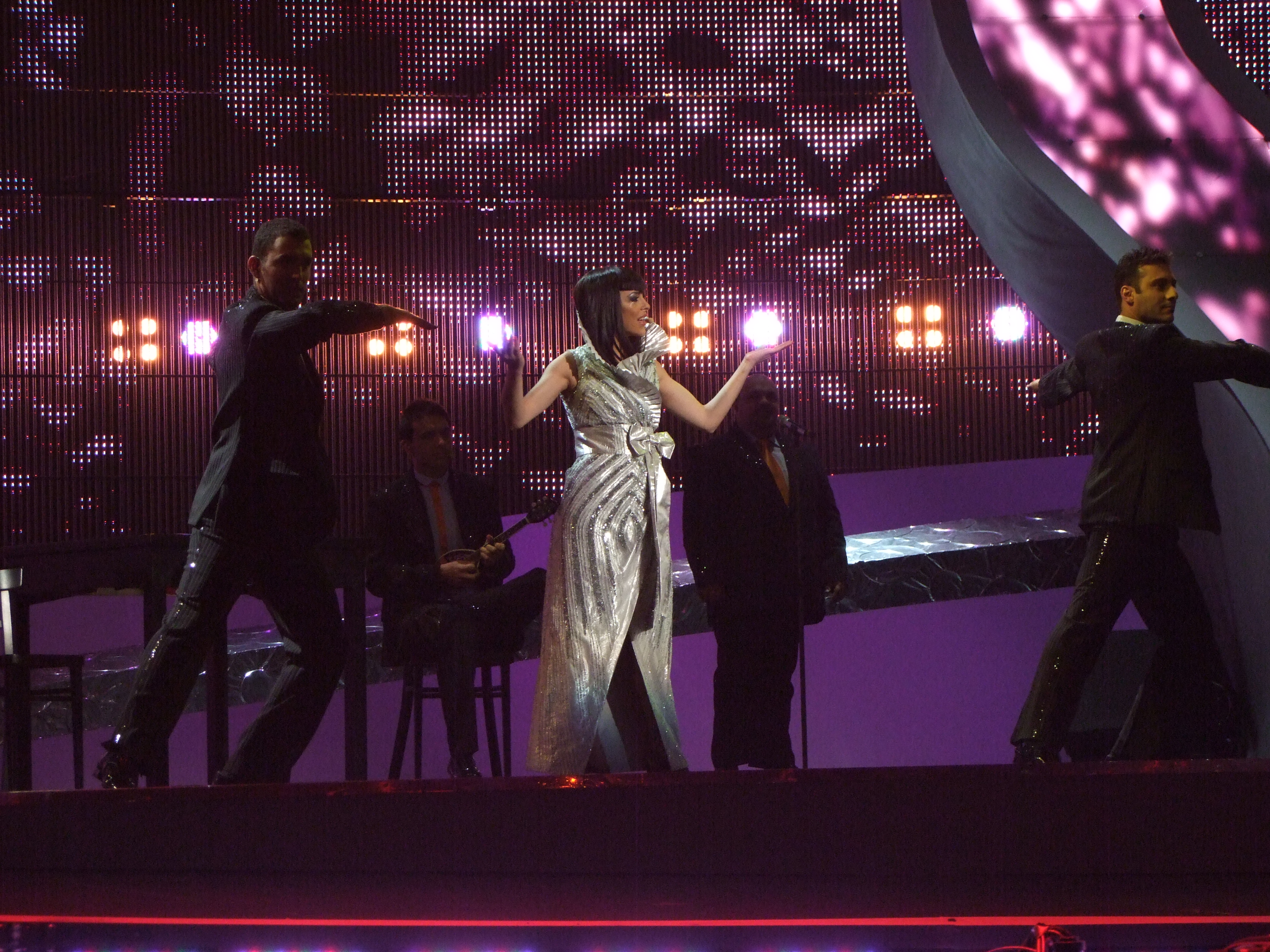
Evdokia Kadí in Belgrade (2008)

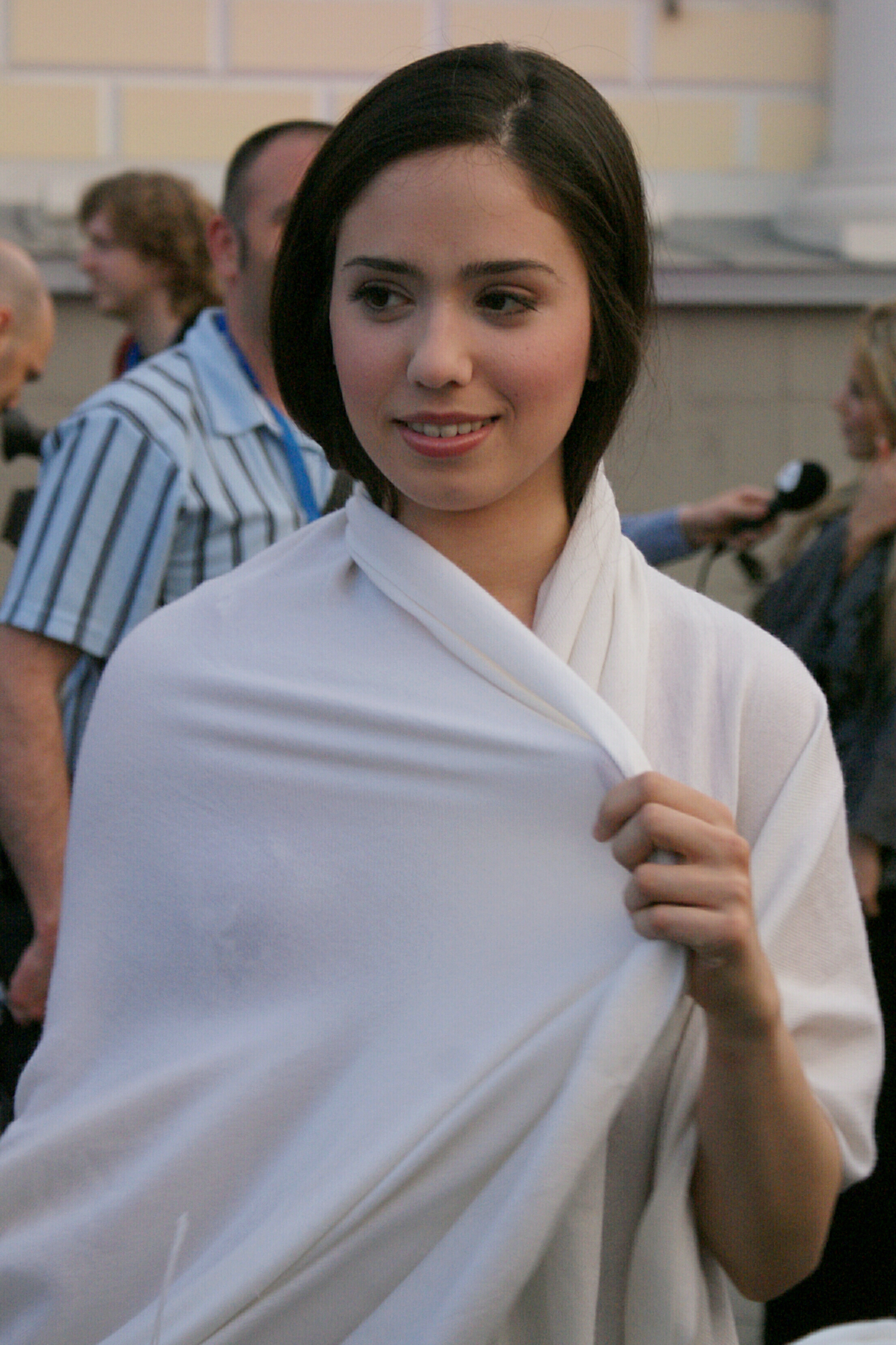
Christina Metaxa in Moscow (2009)

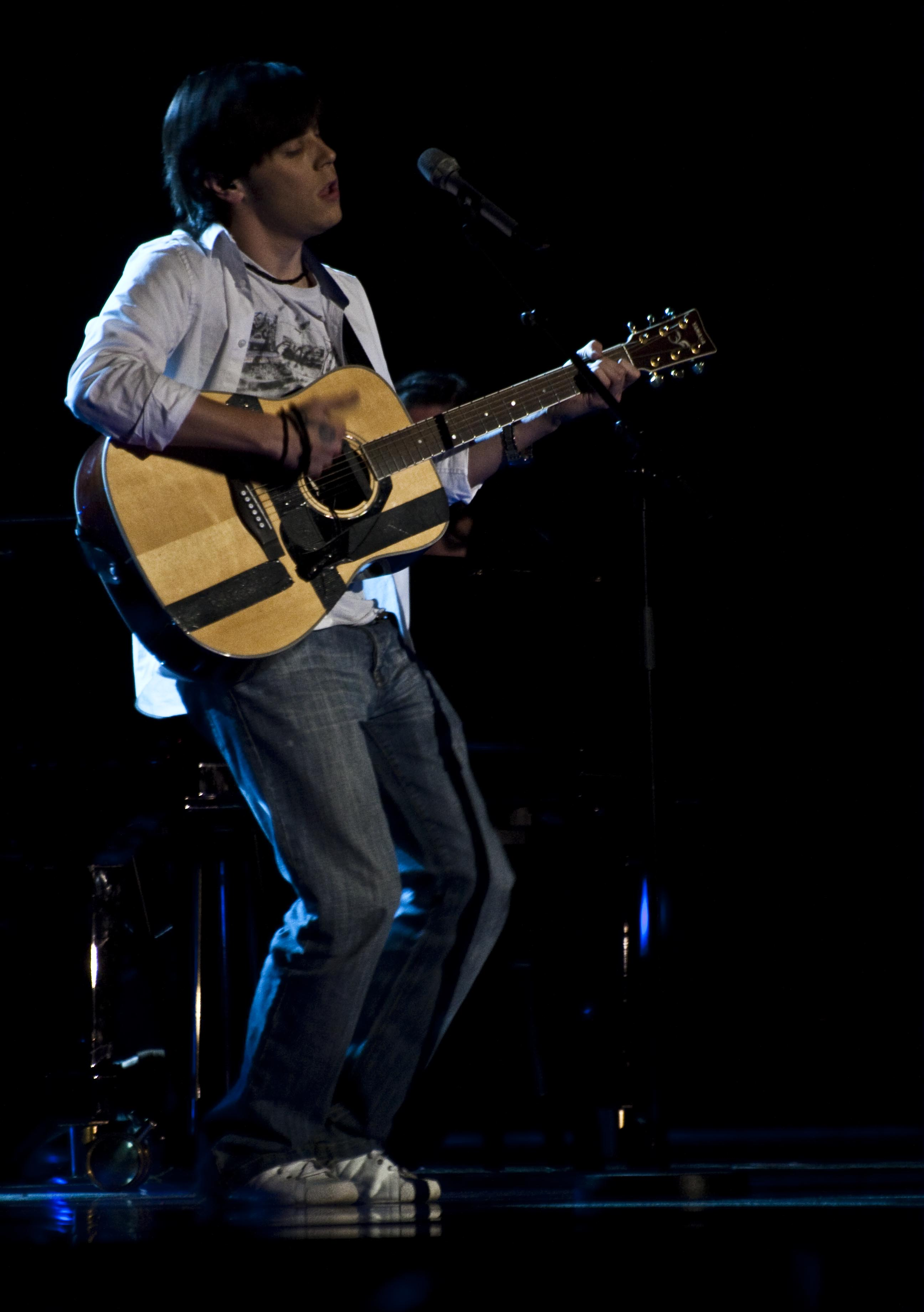
Jon Lilygreen and the Islanders in Oslo (2010)

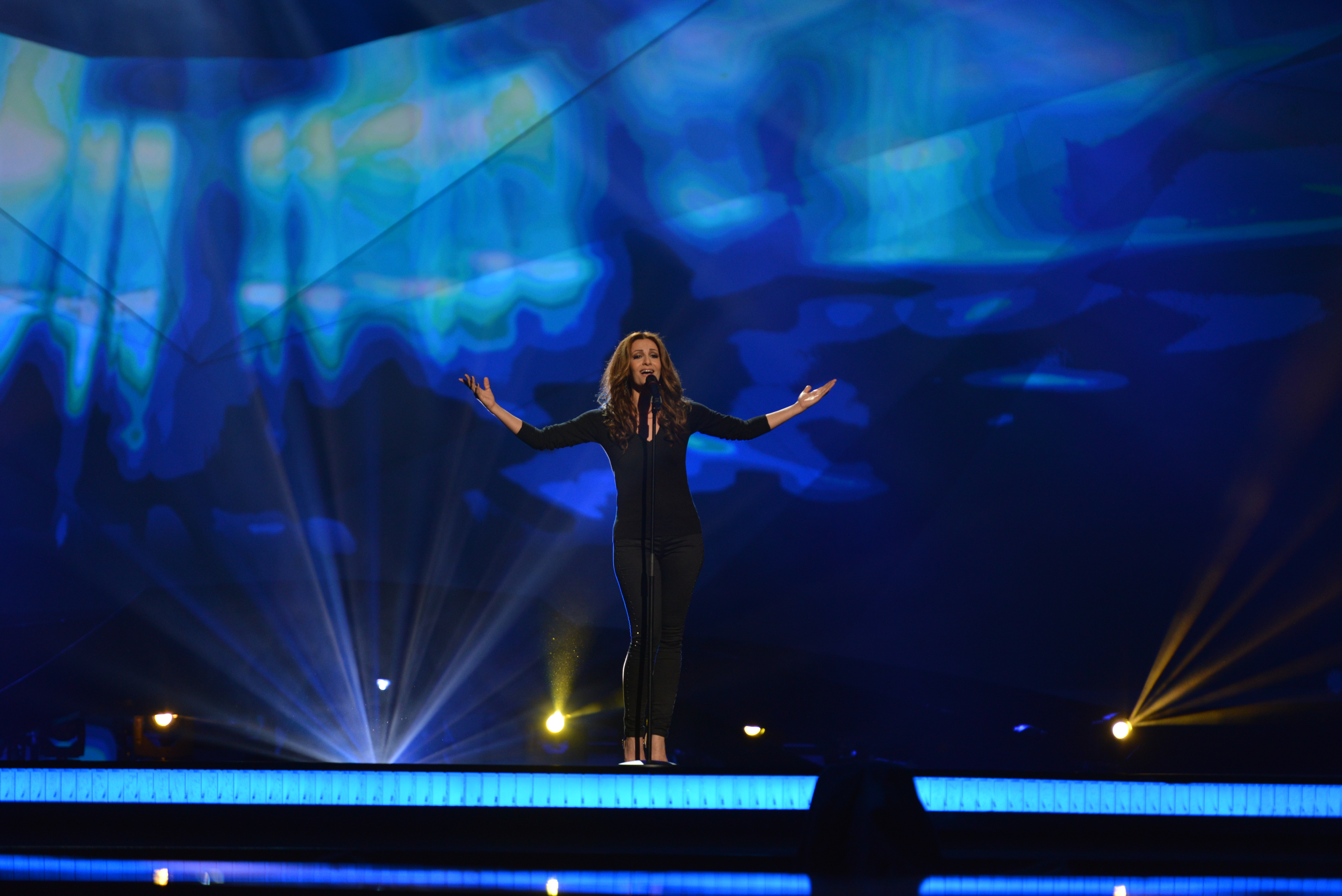
Despina Olympiou in Malmö (2013)

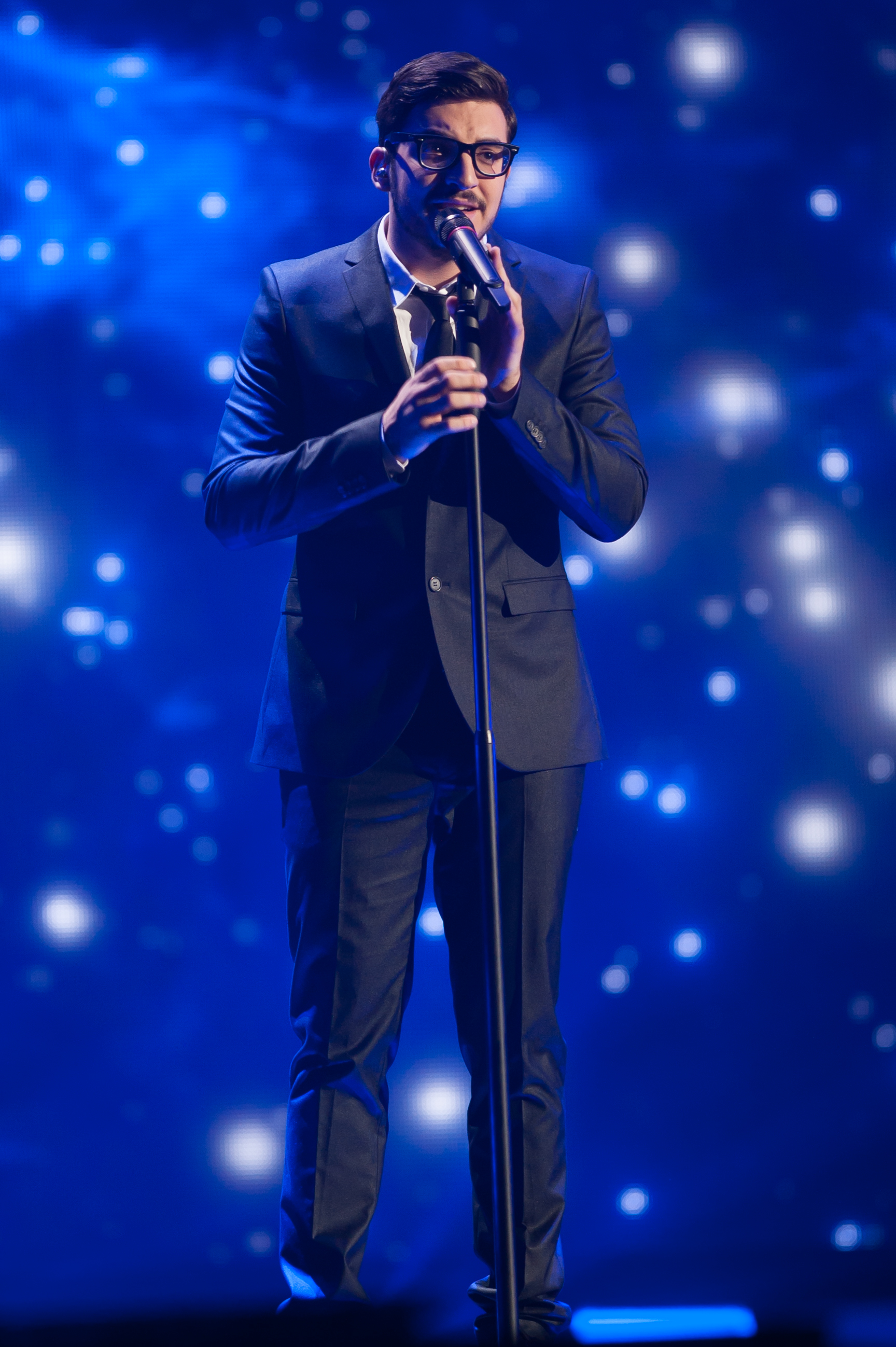
Giannis Karagiannis in Vienna (2015)

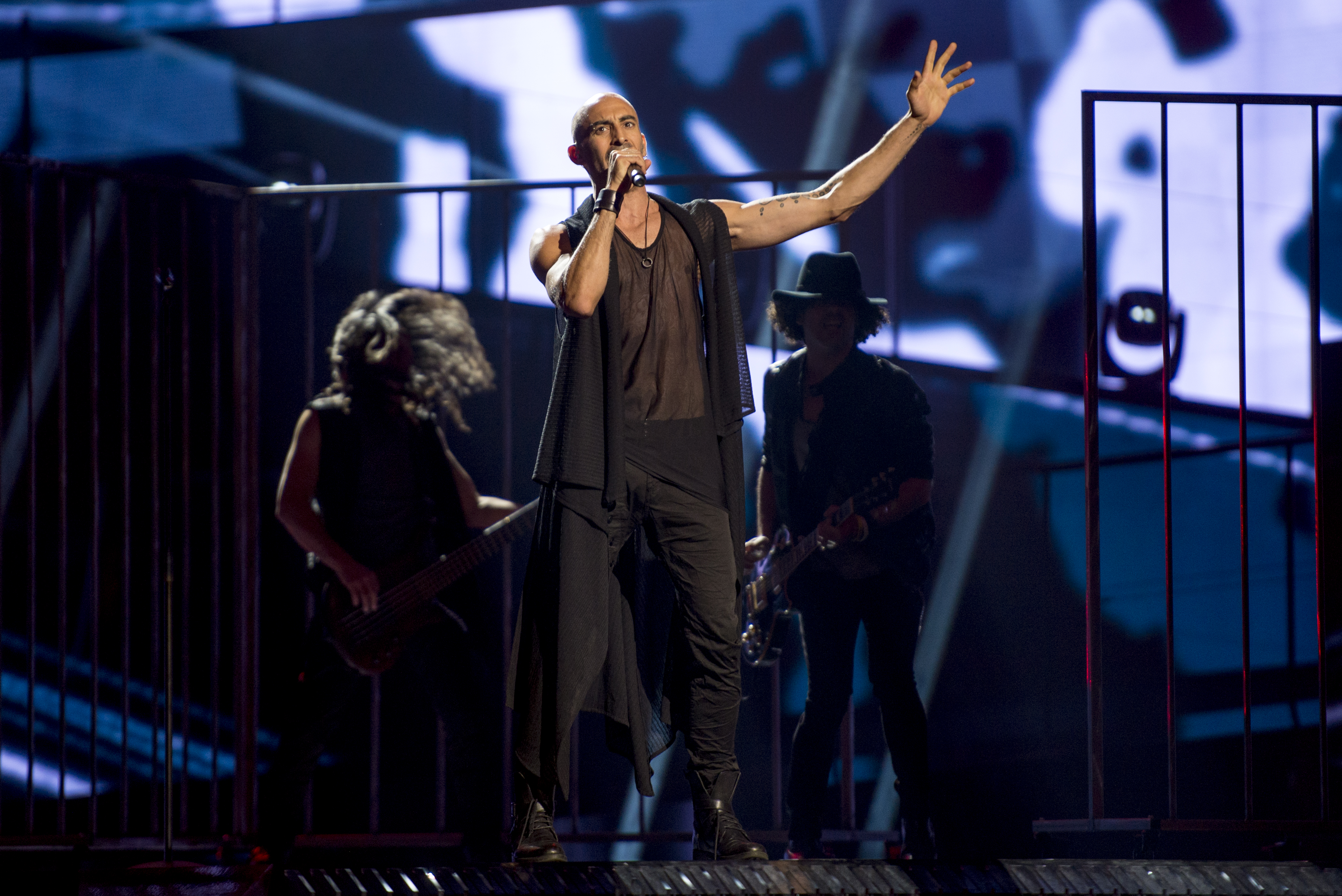
Minus One in Stockholm (2016)

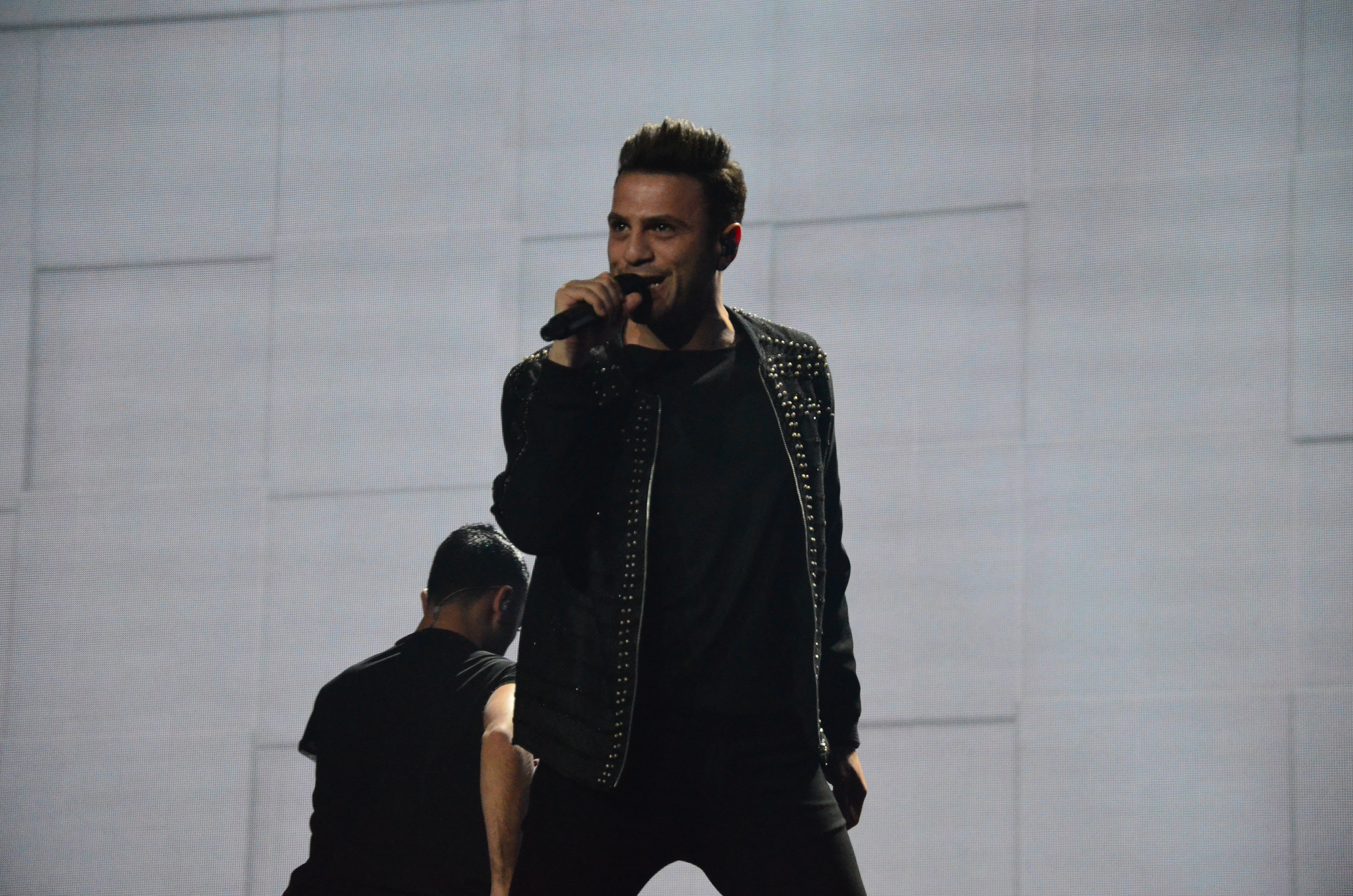
Hovig in Kyiv (2017)

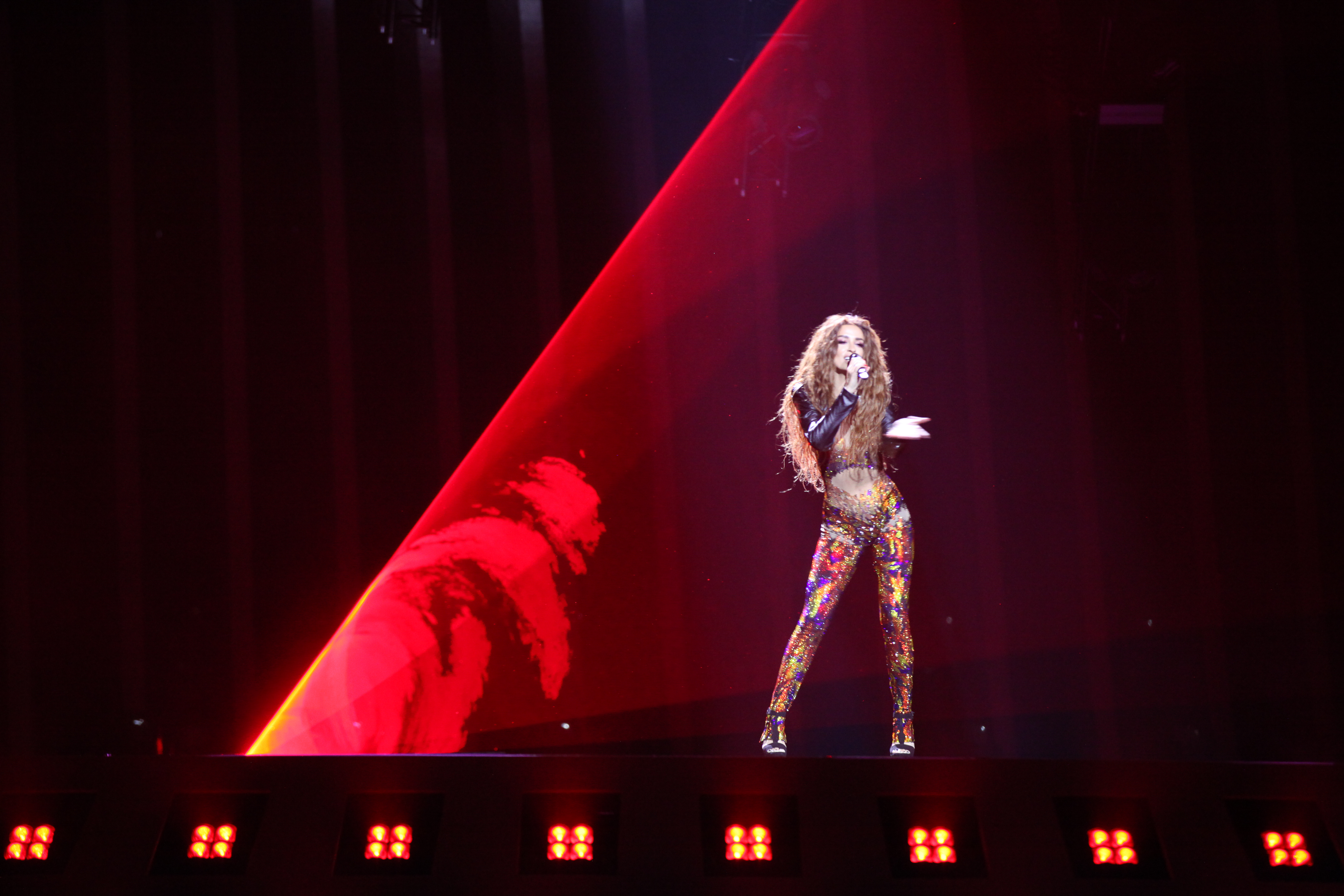
Eleni Foureira in Lisbon (2018)

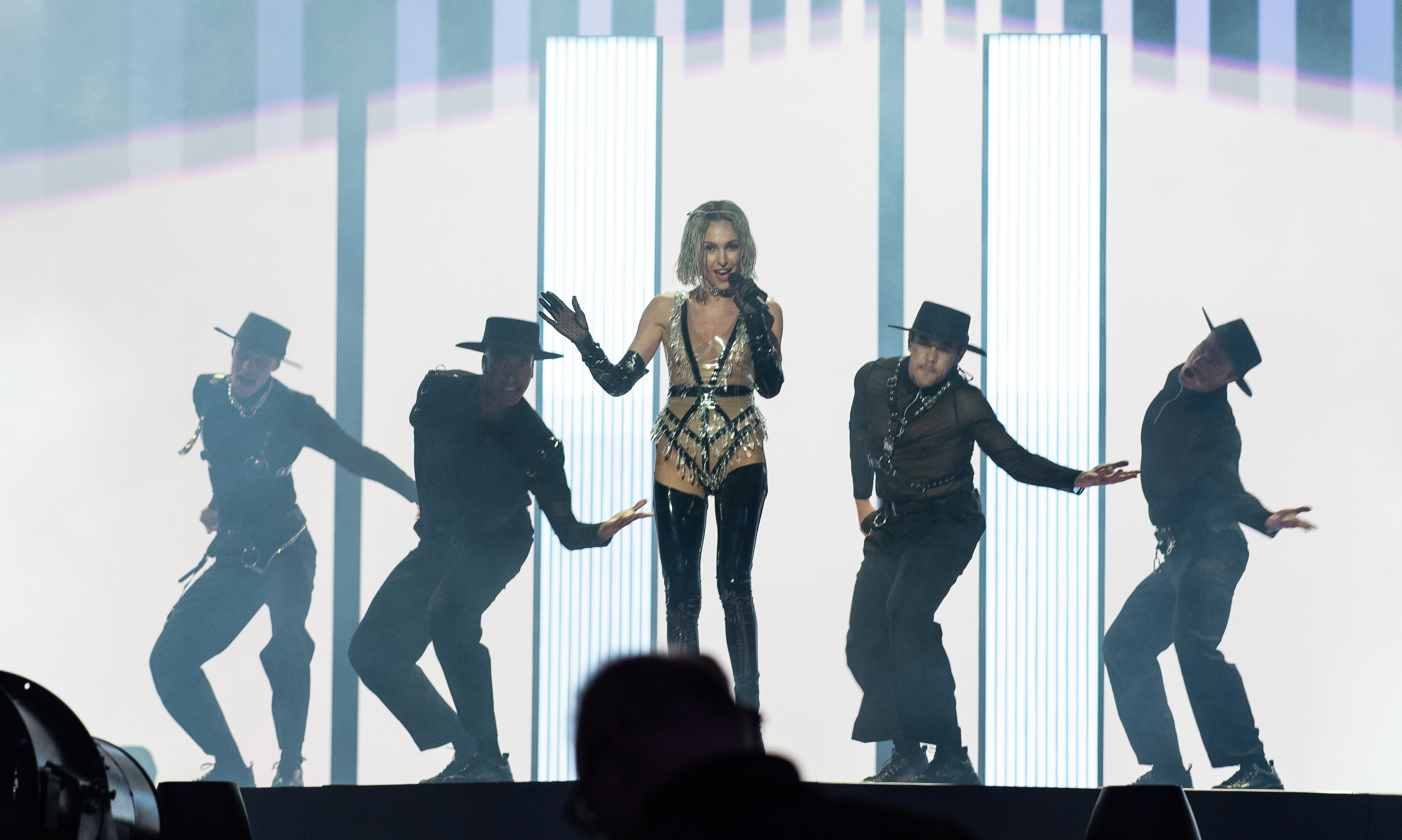
Tamta in Tel Aviv (2019)

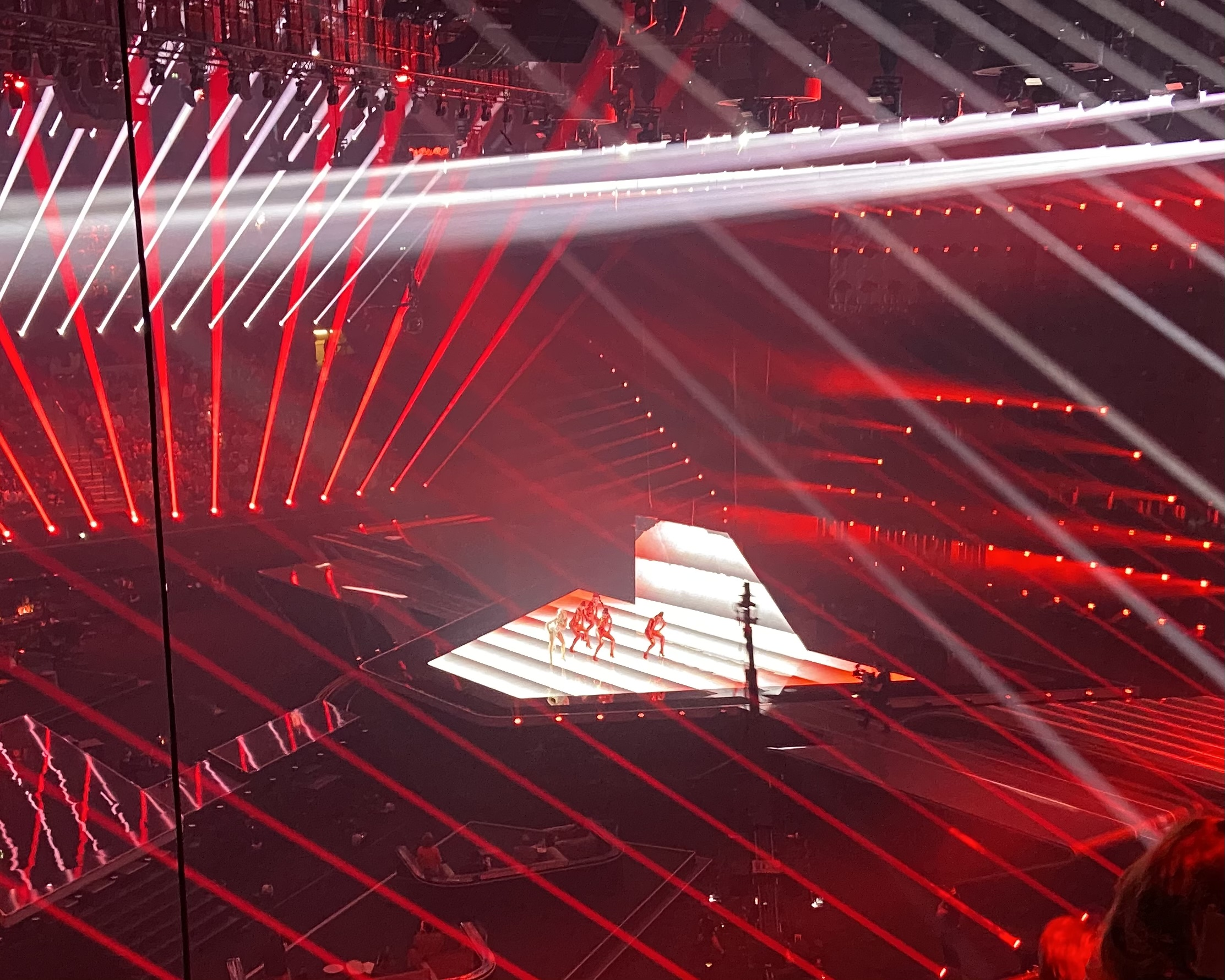
Elena Tsagrinou in Rotterdam (2021)

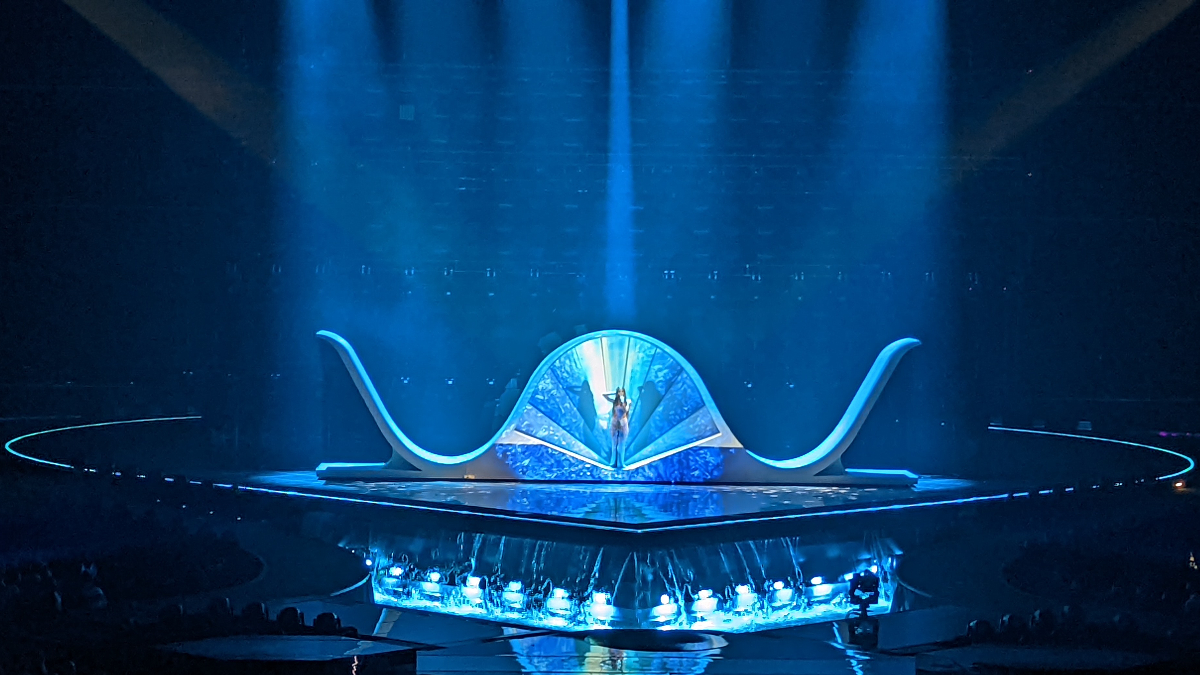
Andromache in Turin (2022)

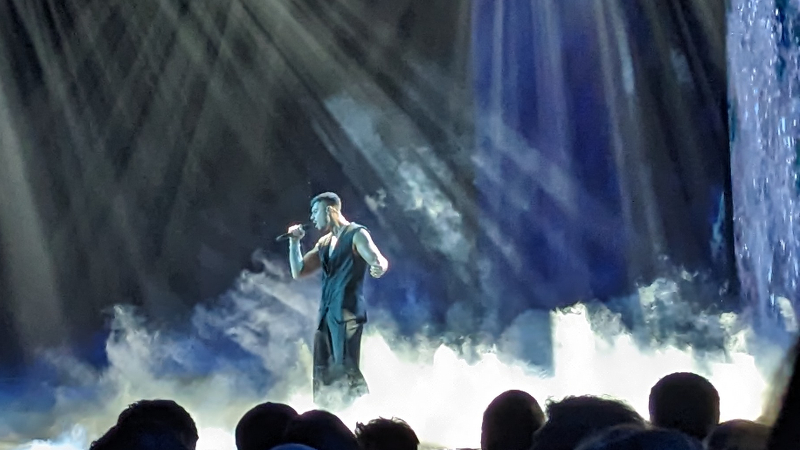
Andrew Lambrou in Liverpool (2023)

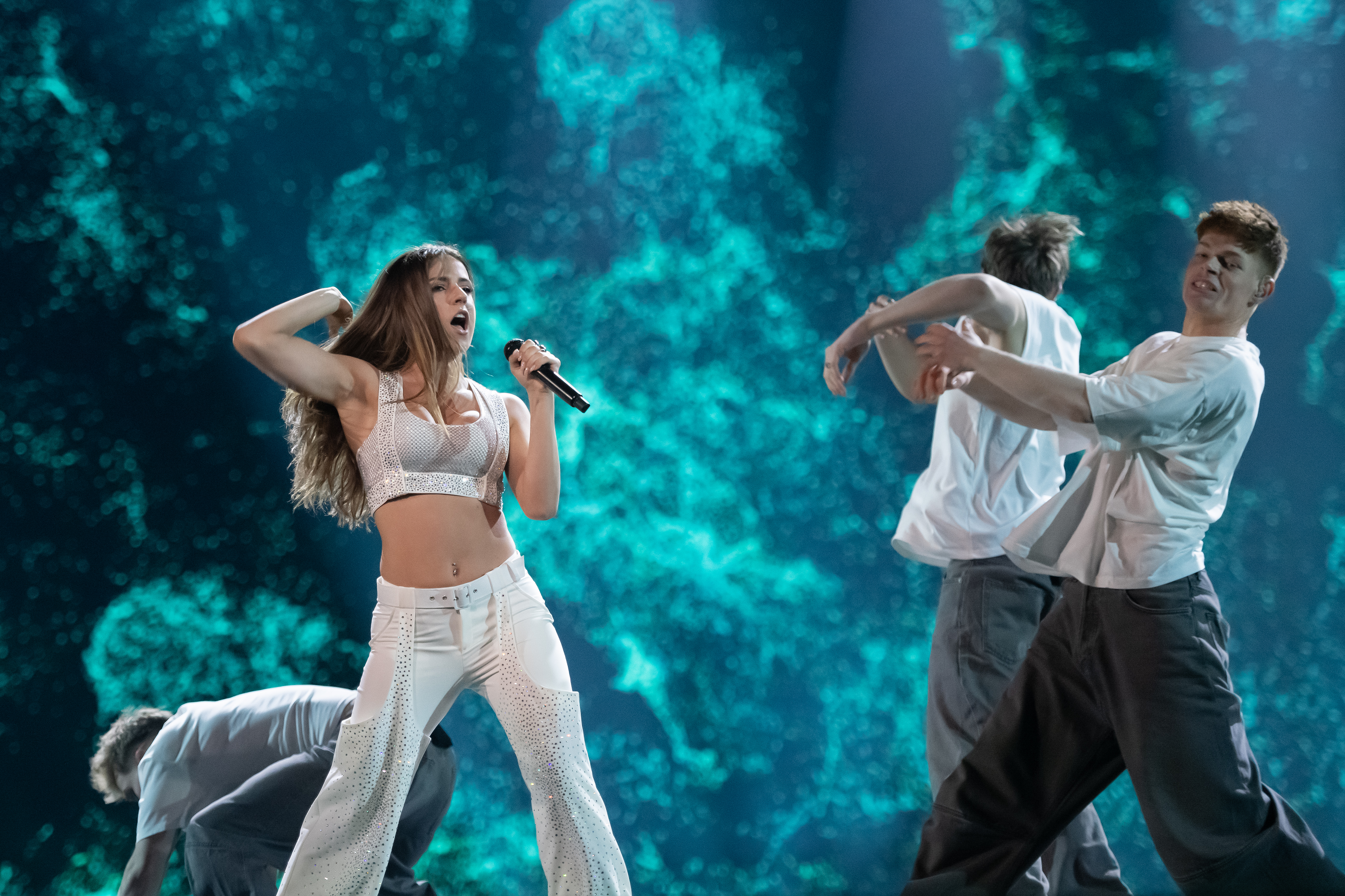
Silia Kapsis in Malmö (2024)

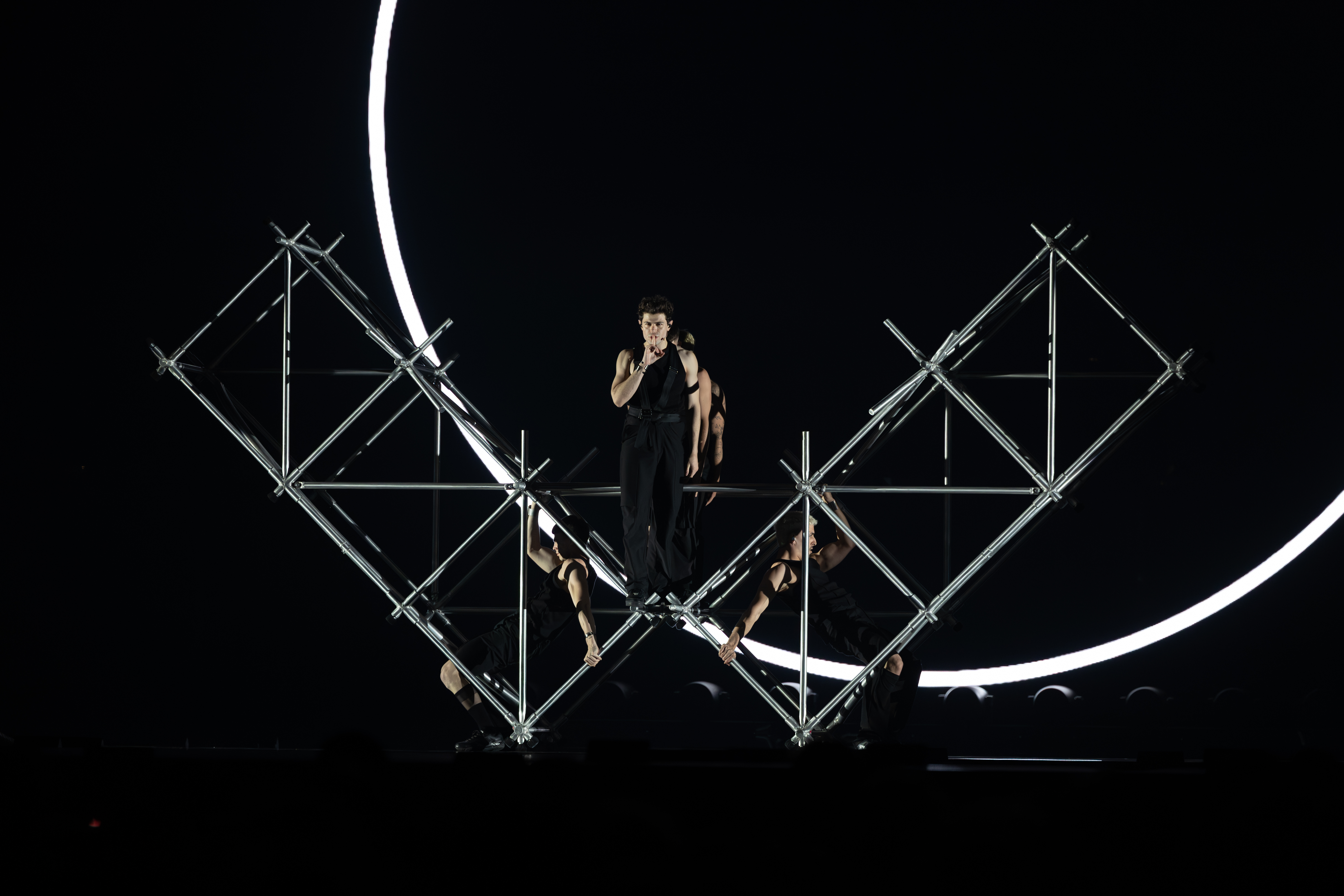
Theo Evan in Basel (2025)

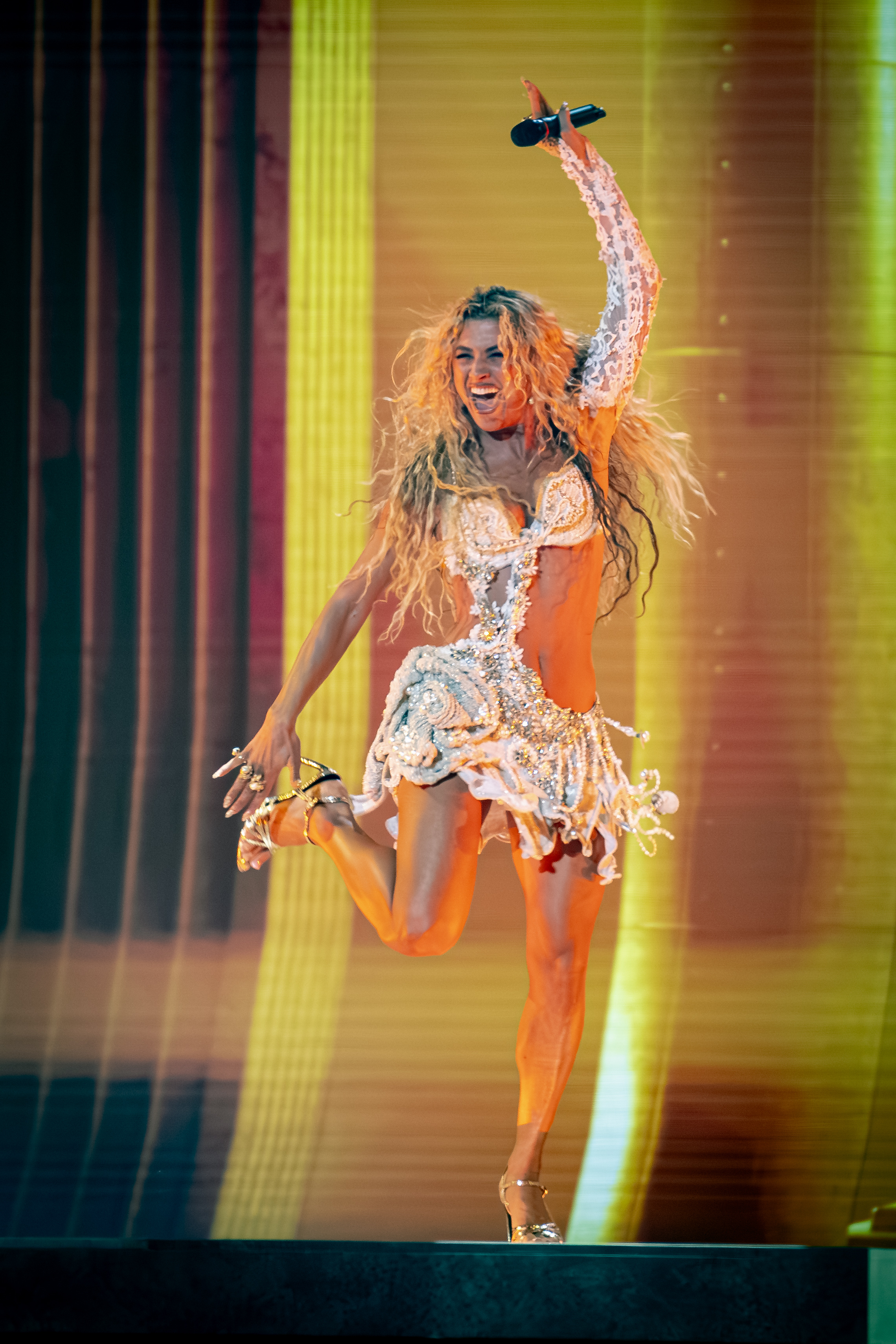
Antigoni in Vienna (2026)

== See also ==
- Cyprus in the Eurovision Young Musicians
- Cyprus in the Junior Eurovision Song Contest
