= Antigoni Buxton =

Cypriuot and British singer (born 1996)

Antigoni Αντιγόνη
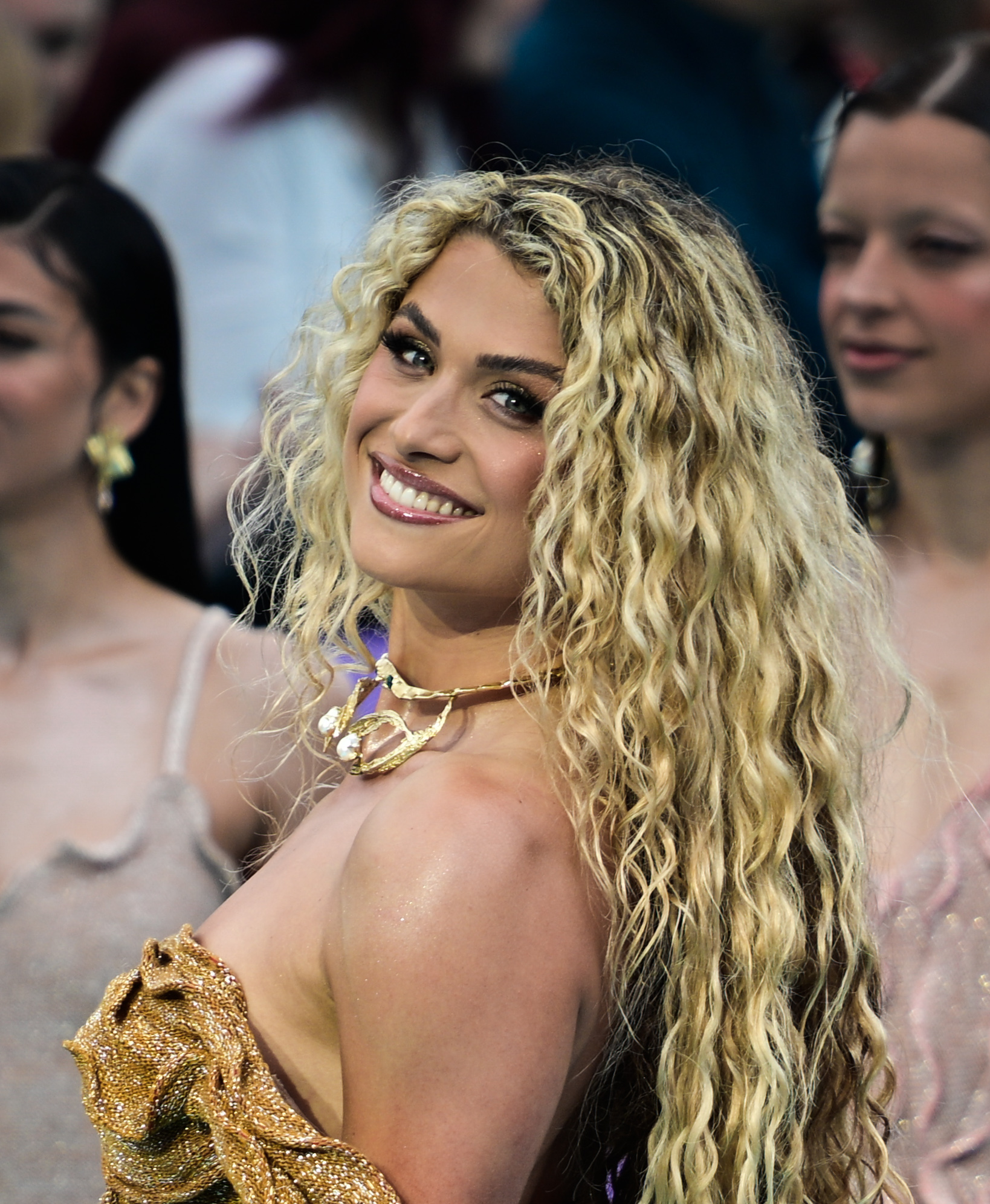
- Antigoni in 2026

Background information
- Born: Antigoni Buxton; 9 March 1996 (age 30); London, England
- Genre: Pop
- Occupations: Singer; songwriter
- Instrument: Vocals
- Years active: 2018–present

Antigoni Buxton (Greek: Αντιγόνη Μπάξτον; born 9 March 1996), known mononymously as Antigoni, is a Cypriot and British singer and songwriter. The daughter of television host Tonia Buxton, she competed on the eighth season of the reality show Love Island. She represented Cyprus in the Eurovision Song Contest 2026 with the song "Jalla", placing 19th in the final.

== Early life and education ==
Buxton was born in London, England and grew up in the East Finchley area. She is the daughter of British-born Greek Cypriot parents, chef and television presenter Tonia Buxton and half-English architect Paul Buxton. Buxton regularly spent time in Cyprus during her childhood and has stated that she grew up listening to both British pop music and Greek-language music.

Buxton attended Woodhouse College and the BRIT School. She took performing arts classes from a young age and later began independently releasing music online while developing a social media following.

== Career ==
=== 2019–2021: Early releases ===
Buxton independently released her debut singles "2 Steps" and "Boosting" in 2019. In April 2020, she released her debut extended play A1, which blended contemporary pop with Mediterranean and dance influences.

During the COVID-19 pandemic, Buxton continued releasing standalone singles including "Way Too Much", featuring Ebenezer, and "Friends". Her single "Never Gonna Love", released in collaboration with producer goddard., entered the UK Singles Downloads Chart.

=== 2022–2024: Love Island and Hexagon ===
In 2022, Buxton appeared as a contestant on the eighth series of Love Island. Her appearance on the programme significantly increased her public profile and streaming numbers.

Following the programme, Buxton released the singles "Red Flag", "Hit List", "You Can Have Him", and "Long Way Home". In September 2023, she released her second extended play, Hexagon. The project incorporated dance-pop and electronic influences and received coverage from British entertainment media.

=== 2025–present: Eurovision Song Contest ===
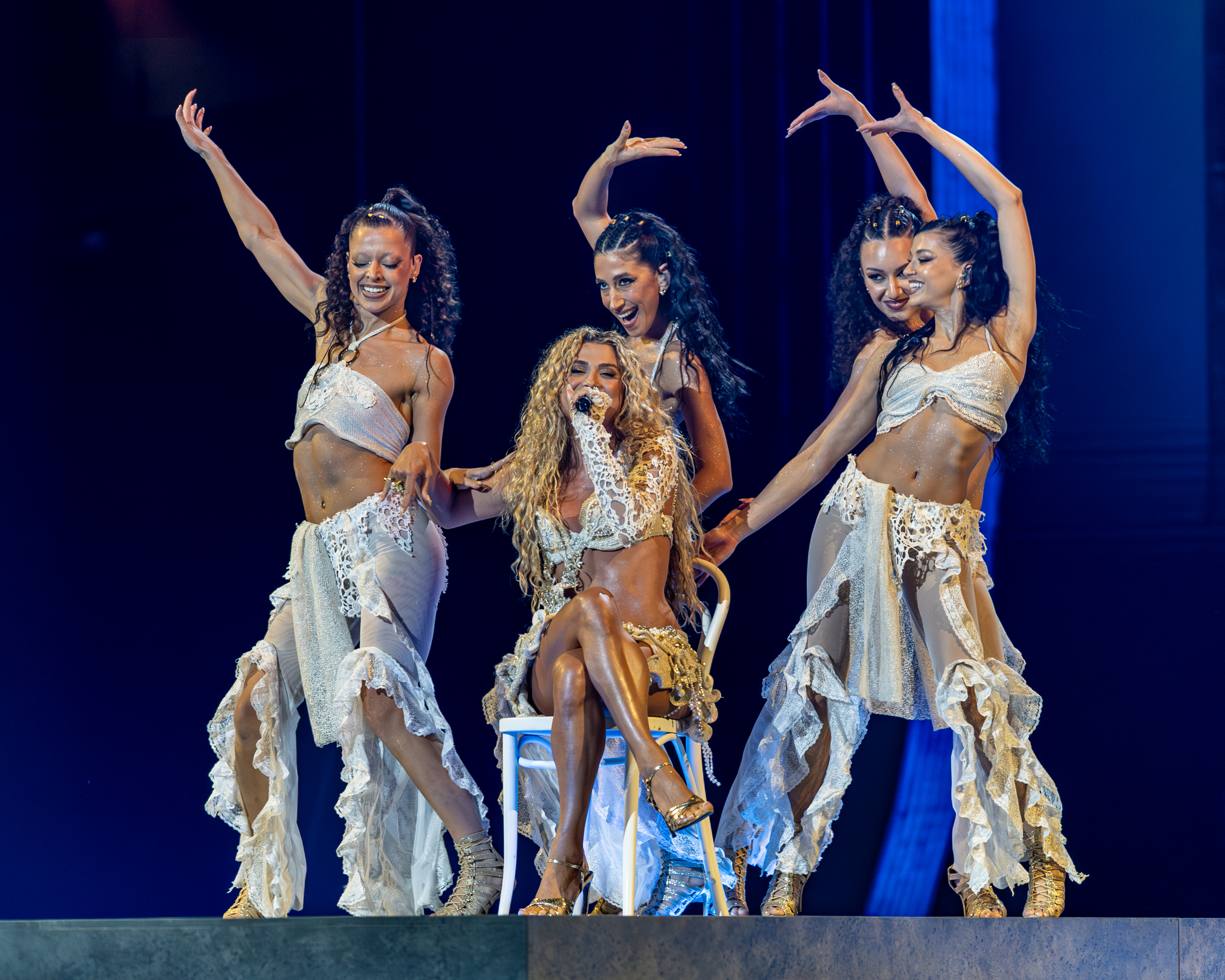
Buxton at the Eurovision Song Contest 2026

On 6 November 2025, the Cyprus Broadcasting Corporation (CyBC) announced that Buxton would represent Cyprus in the Eurovision Song Contest 2026. Her song, "Jalla", was released on 8 February 2026 and combined English lyrics with Greek and Middle Eastern-inspired production elements.

The accompanying music video featured members of Buxton's family alongside Demi from the dance duo Stavros Flatley. Prior to the contest, the song became one of the most-viewed entries of the season on YouTube and developed a large fan following online.

Buxton performed in the second semi-final held in Vienna, Austria, successfully qualifying for the grand final. In the final, Cyprus placed nineteenth with 75 points.

=== Artistry ===
Buxton's music combines mainstream pop with Mediterranean, dance and electronic influences. Critics have compared her Eurovision-era sound to contemporary European dance-pop acts, while her visual presentation has incorporated influences from Cypriot and Greek culture.

=== Public image ===
Following her appearance on Love Island, Buxton became associated with influencer culture and reality television personalities transitioning into music careers. During Eurovision 2026, she received media attention for her high-energy performances and extensive online promotion of "Jalla".

== Discography ==
=== Extended plays ===
| Title | Details |
|---|---|
| A1 | Released: 19 April 2020; Label: Self-released; Formats: Digital download, streaming |
| Hexagon | Released: 15 September 2023; Label: Self-released; Formats: Digital download, streaming |

=== Singles ===
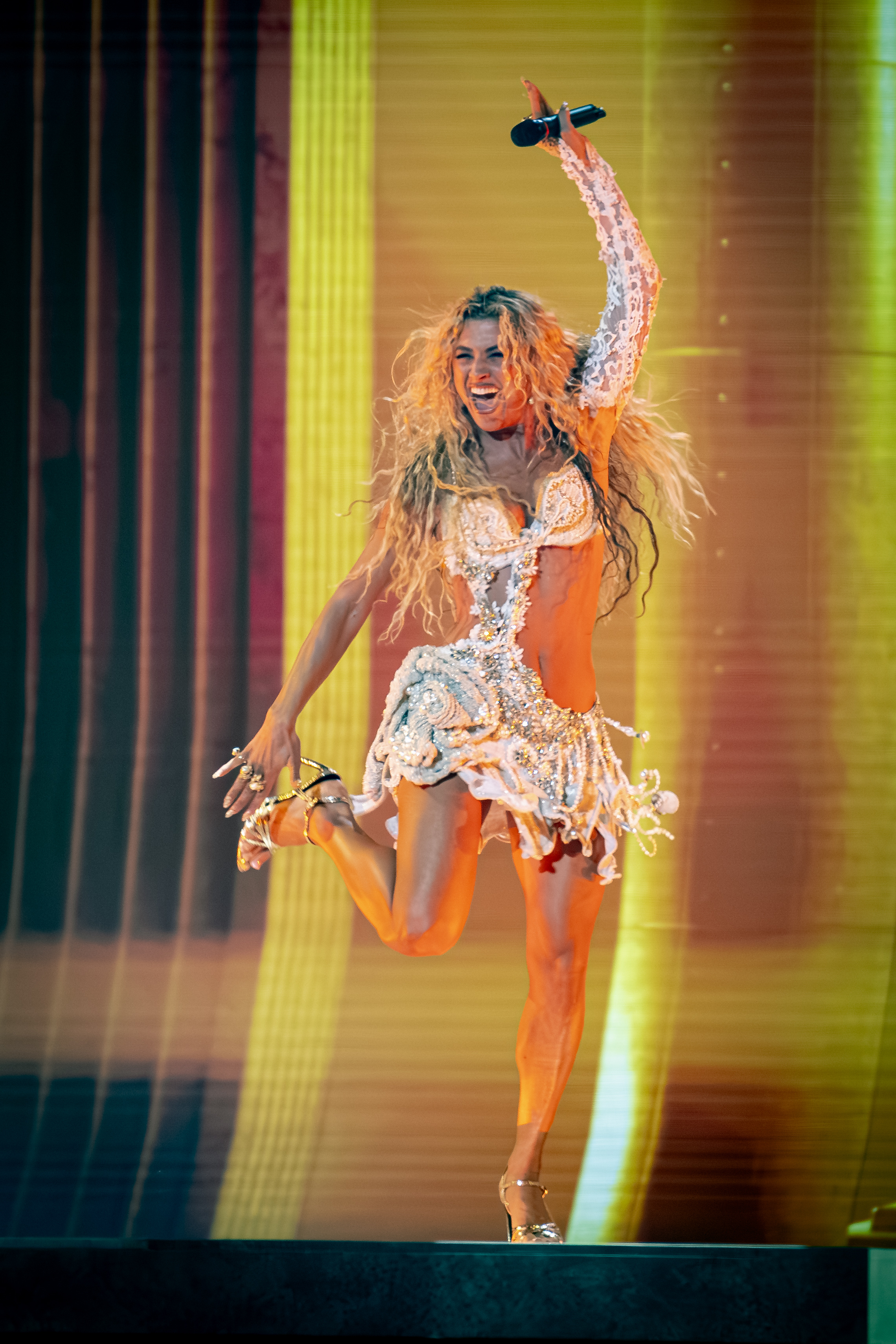
Antigoni at the Eurovision 2026 Second Semi Final rehearsal in Vienna

==== As lead artist ====
| Title | Year | Peak chart positions | | | Album or EP |
| Title | Year | GRE Local | UK Digital | UK Sales | Album or EP |
|---|---|---|---|---|---|
| "2 Steps" | 2019 | — | — | — | A1 |
| "Boosting" | 2019 | — | — | — | A1 |
| "Is It Any Wonder?" | 2020 | — | — | — | A1 |
| "Way Too Much" (featuring Ebenezer) | 2020 | — | — | — | Non-album singles |
| "Friends" | 2020 | — | — | — | Non-album singles |
| "Never Gonna Love" (solo or goddard. edit) | 2020 | — | 72 | 75 | Non-album singles |
| "This Ain't Love" | 2021 | — | — | — | Non-album singles |
| "Red Flag" | 2022 | — | — | — | Hexagon |
| "Hit List" | 2022 | — | — | — | Hexagon |
| "You Can Have Him" | 2022 | — | — | — | Hexagon |
| "Long Way Home" | 2022 | — | — | — | Hexagon |
| "Messy" (with Zion Foster) | 2023 | — | — | — | Non-album single |
| "Nervous" | 2023 | — | — | — | Hexagon |
| "Over" | 2023 | — | — | — | Hexagon |
| "Meine" | 2023 | — | — | — | Non-album singles |
| "R U Down?" (with IamLit) | 2023 | — | — | — | Non-album singles |
| "Lie Lie" | 2024 | — | — | — | Non-album singles |
| "Habibi" | 2025 | — | — | — | Non-album singles |
| "Sleeping Alone" | 2025 | — | — | — | Non-album singles |
| "Man Behind the Wall" | 2025 | — | — | — | Non-album singles |
| "Agapi" (featuring Leveraux and Teome) | 2025 | — | — | — | Non-album singles |
| "Jalla" | 2026 | 5 | 63 | 64 | Non-album singles |
| "Oud" | 2026 | — | — | — | Non-album singles |
| "Gia panta nai (Per sempre sì)" (with Sal Da Vinci) | 2026 | — | — | — | Non-album singles |
"—" denotes a recording that did not chart or was not released in that territory.

==== As featured artist ====
| Title | Year | Album or EP |
|---|---|---|
| "Appetiser" (JyellowL featuring Antigoni) | 2021 | Non-album singles |
| "El helwa zahra" (Ahmed Saad featuring Antigoni) | 2025 | Non-album singles |
| "I Don't Wanna Miss a Thing" (Luke Silva featuring Antigoni) | 2026 | Non-album singles |

Awards and achievements
| Preceded by Theo Evan with "Shh" | Cyprus in the Eurovision Song Contest; 2026 | Succeeded by George Perris |
