= Silia Kapsis =

Australian singer (born 2006)

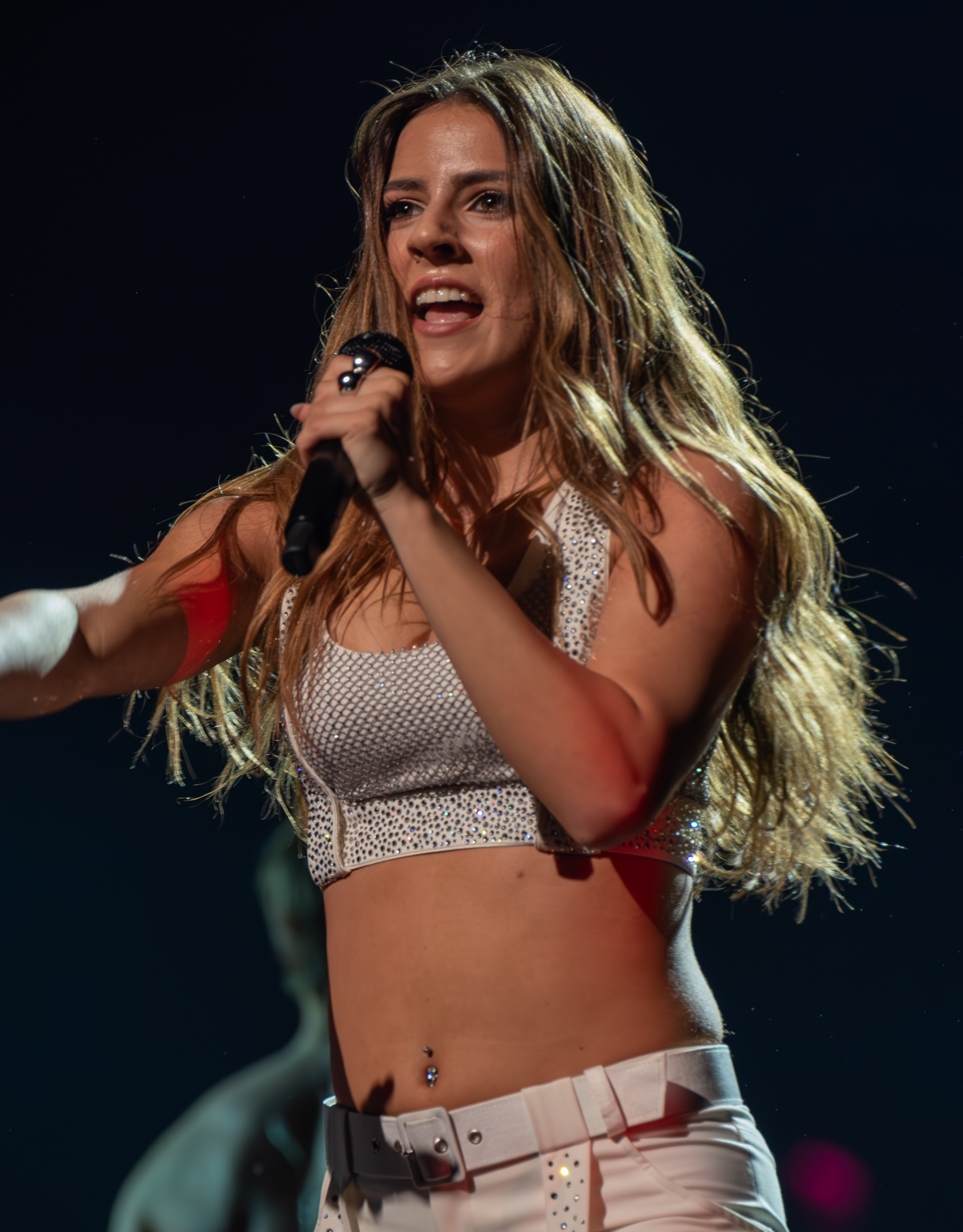
- Kapsis in 2024

Background information
- Born: Vasiliki Silia Kapsis; 5 December 2006 (age 19); Sydney, New South Wales, Australia
- Genres: Pop; dance-pop
- Occupations: Singer; songwriter; dancer; actress
- Instrument: Vocals

Vasiliki Silia Kapsis (/ˈsiːliə ˈkæpsɪs/ SEE-lee-ə KAP-siss; Greek: Βασιλική Σίλια Καψή, romanized: Vasilikí Sília Kapsí; born 5 December 2006) is an Australian singer, dancer, and actress of Greek and Cypriot descent.

== Early life and career ==
Vasiliki Silia Kapsis was born in Sydney, to Cypriot singer Giorgos Kapsis and Greek lawyer and former dancer Despina "Rebecca" Saivanidis from Thessaloniki. She spent her childhood in Sydney, growing up in an artistic environment and performing since the age of 4. She has been lead singer for the Australian Youth Performing Arts Company (AYPAC) and at a number of events worldwide, including being the solo performer at actor Alex Russell's 30th birthday event in Los Angeles.

Her debut song, "Who Am I?", which she wrote and composed at age 12, was released in 2022. She released two more singles, "No Boys Allowed", and "Disco Dancer", in March and May 2023. Her fourth single "Night Out", inspired by R&B and pop sounds, was released in early November 2023.

Kapsis was selected for the ImmaBeast Dance Company in Los Angeles. She danced with Stephen "tWitch" Boss on The Jennifer Hudson Show and featured in a dance documentary produced by rapper Taboo.

Kapsis made her acting debut as the lead character in the 2022 short film Pearly Gates and has worked on various television projects for the Australian Nickelodeon, appearing as a regular host on the local version of Nick News. Along with the other hosts, she was nominated for Aussie/Kiwi Legend of the Year at the Nickelodeon Kids' Choice Awards in 2023.

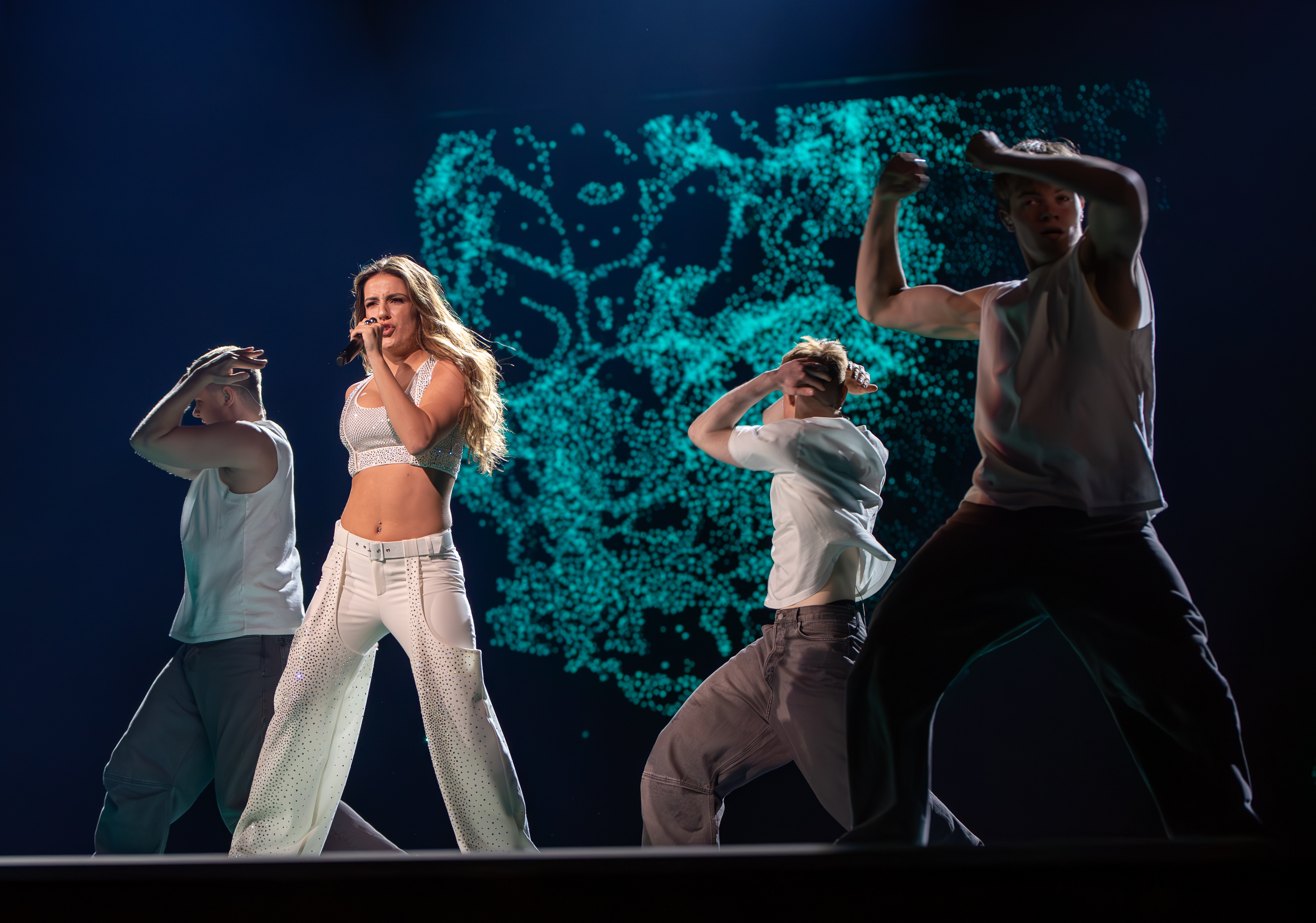
Silia Kapsis at the Eurovision Song Contest 2024

On 25 September 2023, she was announced as the Cypriot entrant for the Eurovision Song Contest 2024, to be held in Malmö, Sweden. On 8 January 2024, the title of her competing song, "Liar", was revealed. The song was released on the following 29 February. At Eurovision, Kapsis was drawn to compete in the first semi-final, where she placed sixth out of 15 with 67 points, qualifying to the final, where she placed 15th out of 25 with 78 points.

In September 2025, Kapsis was cast to act in the upcoming film K-Pop Superstar: The Movie.

== Discography ==
=== Singles ===
Title	Year	Peak chart positions		Album / EP
Title	Year	LTU	SWE Heat.	Album / EP
"Who Am I?"	2022	—	—	Non-album singles
"No Boys Allowed"	2023	—	—	Non-album singles
"Disco Dancer"	2023	—	—	Non-album singles
"Night Out"	2023	—	—	Non-album singles
"Liar"	2024	25	6	Non-album singles
"Red Flag"	2024	—	—	Non-album singles
"What's Your Name Again"	2025	—	—	Non-album singles
"—" denotes a single that did not chart or was not released in that territory.

== Accolades ==
- Bobby McCloughan Creative Arts Award (130th Anniversary Award) at Claremont College, Sydney (2018)
- St Vincent's College Madame Christian Scholarship for Singing (2019)
- BuildaBeast Sydney Scholarship (2019)
- Village Nation Performing Arts College Scholarship (2021)
- Total Slay (Eurovision Awards 2024)

Awards and achievements
Preceded by Andrew Lambrou with "Break a Broken Heart"	Cyprus in the Eurovision Song Contest; 2024	Succeeded by Theo Evan with "Shh"
