= Jalla (song) =

2026 song by Antigoni

Single by Antigoni
- English title: "More"
- Released: 8 February 2026
- Length: 2:59
- Label: Minos EMI
- Songwriters: Antigoni Buxton; Charalambous Kallona; Connor Mullally-Knight; Demetris Nikolaou; Klejdi Lupa; Paris Kalpos; Trey Qua
- Producers: Kalpos; Lupa; Mullally-Knight; Qua

Antigoni singles chronology
"Sleeping Alone" (2025)	"Jalla" (2026)	"Oud" (2026)

Music video
- "Jalla" on YouTube

Eurovision Song Contest 2026 entry
- Country: Cyprus
- Artist: Antigoni
- Languages: English; Cypriot Greek
- Composers: Antigoni Buxton; Charalambous Kallona; Connor Mullally-Knight; Demetris Nikolaou; Klejdi Lupa; Paris Kalpos; Trey Qua
- Lyricists: Antigoni Buxton; Connor Mullally-Knight; Klejdi Lupa; Paris Kalpos; Trey Qua

Finals performance
- Semi-final result: 10th
- Semi-final points: 122
- Final result: 19th
- Final points: 75

Entry chronology
- ◄ "Shh" (2025)

Official performance video
- "Jalla" (second semi-final) on YouTube "Jalla" (grand final) on YouTube

"Jalla" (Cypriot Greek: "Τζι'άλλα", transl. "More") is a song by English Cypriot singer Antigoni. The song was released on 8 February 2026 through Minos EMI. It was written by Buxton, Charalambous Kallona, Connor Mullally-Knight, Demetris Nikolaou, Klejdi Lupa, Paris Kalpos, and Trey Qua. It represented Cyprus in the Eurovision Song Contest 2026, and finished in nineteenth place at the final. The song debuted at number 23 on the Greek Local Singles chart.

== Background and composition ==
"Jalla" was written by Antigoni Buxton with Charalambous Kallona, Connor Mullally-Knight, Demetris Nikolaou, Klejdi Lupa, Paris Kalpos, and Trey Qua. Kalpos, Lupa, Mullally-Knight, and Qua also produced the song. The title, "Jalla", is a word from Cypriot Greek meaning "more". Nikolaou is credited with proposing the word "Jalla" (J’alla) as the Cypriot dialect term for the song at Buxton's suggestion to incorporate the dialect into the lyrics.

Musically, the song was described as "an up-tempo tune that merges traditional sounds with big-scale beats". It was further described as a "Mediterranean summer-pop anthem" which uses traditional Cypriot instrumentation, including çifteli and lute. Lyrically, according to Buxton, the song is about "energy, passion, and striving for more in life". She further added that the track was intended to reflect the "Cypriot spirit" while maintaining international appeal.

== Release and music video ==
The song and its music video premiered on the Cypriot broadcaster's main evening news bulletin on 8 February 2026. Following the initial broadcast, the music video was released on the official YouTube channel of the Eurovision Song Contest. It was disclosed by the CyBC Director General Thanasis Tsokos that the budget for the filming of the official music video, as well as the production expenses and promotional campaign costs, amounted to approximately €100,000, which was covered by Buxton's music label, Minos EMI.

The music video was directed by Alexis "Bodega" Kostel and its filming took place at multiple Cypriot towns and villages. It was later revealed on the show With Love Christiana by the president of the Community Council of Lythrodontas, where the filming of the music video began, that around 200 to 250 residents were gathered to join the shooting. The outfits featured in the music video were designed by Cypriot designer Gregory Morfi.

== Promotion ==
To promote "Jalla" before the Eurovision Song Contest 2026, Buxton performed as an interval act at Sing for Greece 2026, the Greek national selection for the Eurovision Song Contest 2026. She also participated at the Nordic Eurovision Party 2026 held at Rockefeller Oslo on 21 March 2026.

== Critical reception ==
=== Cypriot media and personalities ===
The song's release was met with mixed critical reception. While many positive comments appeared online from the general audience, many were vocal against the song. On 10 February 2026, multiple known persons in the Cypriot cultural and media scene formally expressed their dissatisfaction with the song's participation in the Eurovision Song Contest 2026. In the letter sent to the president and members of the Cyprus Broadcasting Corporation (CyBC) management committee, they claimed that the song's music video "did not accurately depict the Cypriot traditions and cultural image of Cyprus" while also claiming that the video clip "includes and legalises very dangerous unlawful road driving practises", in reference to a scene in the music video where a group of youths are doing wheelies on motorcycles, without wearing helmets.

In response to the letter, CyBC Director General Tsokos released a statement through the CyBC Corporate account on Facebook that same day. In the statement, he mentioned that the music video's online reception is "warm and positive" and that the "reactions of experts and friends of the Eurovision Song Contest on social media are similarly positive". He added any scenes that did not follow road safety principles "have been removed from the clip" and its revised version will be "reposted by the European Broadcasting Union".

=== Eurovision-related and international media ===
Eva Frantz of Yle gave the song a rating of eight out of 10, describing it "a sound that highlights both [Buxton's] British and Cypriot roots, but also offers sounds from the Middle East", and called it a "success". She further characterised the entry as being "challenging without being clumsy" and that Buxton has the charisma to "turn the toughest halloumi into dipping sauce". Glen Weldon of the National Public Radio ranked the entry fourth in his list of the 10 best songs competing at Eurovision 2026, calling it a "classic, old-school Eurovision" entry and categorising the track as an "expression of cultural joy", despite noting Buxton's "iffy vocals".

Jon O'Brien from Vulture ranked the entry 16th out of the 35 entries, calling it "seemingly inoffensive" that has "somehow become one of this year's most provocative entries" because of the controversy surrounding its music video. In TV 2, Line Haus gave the entry a three out of six, calling what she describes as "one of this year's most delicious potential summer hits on streaming platforms" disappointing and "completely fell through live without any punch". She further criticised Buxton's vocal timing, sour tones, and flow in her choreography. In the Norwegian newspaper Dagbladet, Ralf Lofstad gave the song a two out of six, describing it as "quite lively" and "atmospheric" but "never reaches the really great heights". He further criticised the staging for being empty and Buxton's "shaky" vocals.

== Eurovision Song Contest 2026 ==
=== Internal selection ===
Cyprus' broadcaster for the Eurovision Song Contest, the Cyprus Broadcasting Corporation (CyBC), announced its intention to participate in the Eurovision Song Contest 2026 on 14 August 2025, and later confirming an internal selection to select its 2026 entry. The selection of the Cypriot entrant consisted of two parts: the first involved the votes of a five-member jury panel from nine potential artists proposed by Greek record labels, and the second involved an online questionnaire posted via the broadcaster's website between 30 October and 6 November 2025, during which the public could express their opinion on the artists and its participation in general. On 6 November 2025, CyBC announced that British-Cypriot singer Antigoni Buxton would represent Cyprus in Vienna.

=== At Eurovision ===
The Eurovision Song Contest 2026 took place at Wiener Stadthalle in Vienna, Austria, and consisted of two semi-finals held on the respective dates of 12 and 14 May and the final on 16 May 2026. During the allocation draw held on 12 January 2026, Cyprus was assigned to compete in the second semi-final, performing in the latter half of the show. Buxton was later drawn to perform eighth, after Switzerland's Veronica Fusaro and before Austria's Cosmó.

For its Eurovision performance, the staging was choreographed by Natalia Michael and Sacha Jean-Baptiste. Michael also performed as one of the four dancers joining Buxton, alongside Anna Chatzikyriakou, Konstantina Spyrou, and Sophia Papakonstantinou. "Jalla" qualified for the grand final.

Buxton performed a repeat of her performance in the grand final on 16 May. The song performed 21st, after Sweden's Felicia and before Italy's Sal Da Vinci. It received 75 points, finishing on 19th place.

== Track listing ==
Digital download/streaming

1. "Jalla" – 2:59

Digital download/streaming – Afro-house rework (with Gigi)

1. "Jalla" (Afro-house rework) – 3:12
2. "Jalla" (Afro-house rework extended) – 4:13
3. "Jalla" – 2:59

Digital download/streaming – Arabic remix

1. "Jalla" (Arabic remix) (with Oualid) – 3:14

Digital download/streaming – Anastasia remix

1. "Jalla" (Anastasia remix) – 2:05

== Charts ==
Chart performance for "Jalla"
Chart (2026)	Peak position
Austria (Ö3 Austria Top 40)	26
Greece Local (IFPI)	5
Lithuania (AGATA)	19
Sweden Heatseeker (Sverigetopplistan)	5
UK Singles Sales (OCC)	64

== Certifications ==
Certifications for "Jalla"
Region	Certification	Certified units/sales
Greece (IFPI Greece)	Platinum	2,000,000^{†}
^{†} Streaming-only figures based on certification alone.

== Release history ==
Release dates and formats for "Jalla"
Region	Date	Format(s)	Version	Label	Ref.
Various	8 February 2026	Digital download; streaming	Original	Minos EMI	
Various	21 May 2026	Digital download; streaming	Afro-house rework	Minos EMI	
Various	22 May 2026	Digital download; streaming	Arabic remix	Minos EMI	
Various	2 July 2026	Digital download; streaming	Anastasia remix	Minos EMI	
