= Break a Broken Heart =

2023 song by Andrew Lambrou

Single by Andrew Lambrou
- Language: English
- Released: 2 March 2023
- Length: 2:58
- Label: Panik; City Pop
- Songwriters: Jimmy Jansson; Jimmy "Joker" Thornfeldt; Marcus Winther-John; Thomas Stengaard

Andrew Lambrou singles chronology
"Electrify" (2022)	"Break a Broken Heart" (2023)	"Take My Breath Away" (2023)

Music video
- "Break a Broken Heart" on YouTube

Eurovision Song Contest 2023 entry
- Country: Cyprus
- Artist: Andrew Lambrou
- Composers: Jimmy Jansson; Jimmy "Joker" Thornfeldt; Marcus Winther-John; Thomas Stengaard
- Lyricists: Jimmy Jansson; Jimmy "Joker" Thornfeldt; Marcus Winther-John; Thomas Stengaard

Finals performance
- Semi-final result: 7th
- Semi-final points: 94
- Final result: 12th
- Final points: 126

Entry chronology
- ◄ "Ela" (2022)
- "Liar" (2024) ►

Official performance video
- "Break a Broken Heart" (second semi-final) on YouTube "Break a Broken Heart" (grand final) on YouTube

"Break a Broken Heart" is a song by Australian singer Andrew Lambrou, released on 2 March 2023. It represented Cyprus in the Eurovision Song Contest 2023 after being internally selected by CyBC, the Cypriot national broadcaster for the Eurovision Song Contest. It finished in 12th place at the final with 126 points and reached the charts in Australia, Finland, Germany, Greece, Iceland, Lithuania, Sweden, and UK.

== Background and composition ==
"Break a Broken Heart" was composed by a mix of Danish and Swedish songwriters, namely Jimmy Jansson, Jimmy "Joker" Thornfeldt, Marcus Winther-John, and Thomas Stengaard. The song was described as a ballad "about relationships that end with a broken heart but in the end they might very well push us to rise again from the ashes, even stronger."

== Release ==
The music video for the song was released on 2 March 2023 on Panik Records' official YouTube channel. The release on digital platforms was released on the same day.

== Eurovision Song Contest ==
=== Selection ===
The Cypriot broadcaster CyBC continued to internally select the Cypriot entry for the Eurovision Song Contest 2023, in conjunction with Panik Records. On 17 October 2022, CyBC announced that they had selected Australian-Cypriot singer Andrew Lambrou to represent Cyprus in Liverpool. Lambrou had previously attempted to represent Australia at the Eurovision Song Contest in 2022, placing seventh in the national final Eurovision – Australia Decides 2022 with the song "Electrify."

=== At Eurovision ===
According to Eurovision rules, all nations with the exceptions of the host country and the "Big Five" (France, Germany, Italy, Spain and the United Kingdom) are required to qualify from one of two semi-finals in order to compete for the final; the top ten countries from each semi-final progress to the final. The European Broadcasting Union (EBU) split up the competing countries into six different pots based on voting patterns from previous contests, with countries with favourable voting histories put into the same pot. On 31 January 2023, an allocation draw was held, which placed each country into one of the two semi-finals, and determined which half of the show they would perform in. Cyprus has been placed into the second semi-final, to be held on 11 May 2023, and has been scheduled to perform in the first half of the show.

== Charts ==
Chart performance for "Break a Broken Heart"
Chart (2023)	Peak position
Australia Digital Tracks (ARIA)	29
Finland (Suomen virallinen lista)	42
German Singles Downloads (GfK Entertainment)	28
Greece Digital Singles Chart (Local) (IFPI)	60
Iceland (Tónlistinn)	21
Lithuania (AGATA)	26
Sweden Heatseeker (Sverigetopplistan)	6
UK Singles (Official Charts)	92
UK Indie (Official Charts)	30
