= Liar (Silia Kapsis song) =

2024 song by Silia Kapsis

Single by Silia Kapsis
- Released: 29 February 2024
- Genre: Dance-pop
- Length: 2:59
- Label: K2ID
- Songwriters: Dimitris Kontopoulos; Elke Tiel

Silia Kapsis singles chronology
"Night Out" (2023)	"Liar" (2024)	"Red Flag" (2024)

Music video
- "Liar" on YouTube

Eurovision Song Contest 2024 entry
- Country: Cyprus
- Artist: Silia Kapsis
- Language: English
- Composer: Dimitris Kontopoulos
- Lyricist: Elke Tiel

Finals performance
- Semi-final result: 6th
- Semi-final points: 67
- Final result: 15th
- Final points: 78

Entry chronology
- ◄ "Break a Broken Heart" (2023)
- "Shh" (2025) ►

Official performance video
- "Liar" (first semi-final) on YouTube "Liar" (grand final) on YouTube

"Liar" is a song by Australian singer Silia Kapsis, released on 29 February 2024 by K2ID Productions. Self-described as a song that derides "people who live in a fake world with a fake script", it was written by Dimitris Kontopoulos and Elke Tiel. The song represented Cyprus in the Eurovision Song Contest 2024, where it finished in 15th place with 78 points at the grand final.

== Background and composition ==
"Liar" was written and composed by Dimitris Kontopoulos and Elke Tiel. In press statements given before the song's release, Kapsis hinted that the song would be a dance-pop song. She also later stated that her song was directed towards for people who live "fake" lives, criticizing them for pushing "body shaming [and] sexualliti [sic]". Kapsis, who has further stated that the song focuses about the effect social media has on young women, proclaimed that the song was made to convince people to leave a "façade of fakeness".

Originally, the song was to be submitted to the Russian selection in 2022, but the country was excluded from the contest following its invasion of Ukraine. In 2023, it was recorded as a demo by the Greek artist Melissa Mantzoukis, with which she participated in the Greek internal selection for that year's contest. The song qualified to the second phase of the selection, where it controversially placed second behind Victor Vernicos with the song "What They Say".

Rumours of Kapsis being picked by Cyprus' broadcaster for the Eurovision Song Contest, the Cyprus Broadcasting Corporation (CyBC), were spread as early as mid-August 2023 by OGAE's Greek branch. Kapsis was officially announced as Cyprus' representative for the Eurovision Song Contest 2024 on 25 September. On 22 February 2024, Kapsis released a snippet as a sneak-peek to promote the song.

== Music video and promotion ==
Along with the song's release, an accompanying music video was released on the same day. The music video was shot in the Cypriot city of Limassol, and was directed by Kostas Karydas. The music video features Kapsis wearing a gold-colored attire.

To further promote the song, Kapsis participated in Eurovision pre-parties, including Eurovision in Concert. She also gave away two tickets to the Eurovision grand final via a competition that featured the song prominently.

== Critical reception ==
In a Wiwibloggs review containing several statements from several critics, the song was rated 6.53 out of 10 points, earning 19th out of the 37 competing songs on the site's annual ranking. Another review conducted by ESC Bubble that contained reviews from a combination of readers and juries rated the song 11th out of the 15 songs in the Eurovision semi-final "Liar" was in. ESC Beat's Doron Lahav ranked the song 17th overall; Lahav admitted that although he thought it had high staging potential, the song itself did not have anything "innovative". In another ranking, Vulture's Jon O'Brien ranked the song 24th overall, deeming it a "watered-down version of the ethnopop banger that reversed its Eurovision fortunes", referring to Eleni Foureira's "Fuego".

== Eurovision Song Contest ==
=== Internal selection ===
Cyprus' broadcaster for the Eurovision Song Contest, the Cyprus Broadcasting Corporation (CyBC), announced its intent to participate in the Eurovision Song Contest 2024 on 19 May 2023. Originally, CyBC planned to organize a national final to select its entrant; however, the show that was going to be used, Fame Story, was a Greek television show. Due to this, the Hellenic Broadcasting Corporation (ERT), the Greek public broadcaster, threatened to withdraw from the European Broadcasting Union if no action was taken. As a result, CyBC changed to an internal selection. Kapsis was later announced as the representative on 25 September.

=== At Eurovision ===
The Eurovision Song Contest 2024 took place at the Malmö Arena in Malmö, Sweden, and consisted of two semi-finals held on the respective dates of 7 and 9 May and the final on 11 May 2024. During the allocation draw on 30 January 2024, Cyprus was drawn to compete in the first semi-final, performing in the first half of the show. Kapsis was later drawn to perform to open the semi-final, behind Serbia's Teya Dora.

The Eurovision performance was choreographed by Kelly Sweeney and Guy Amir, along with Dan Shipton being appointed as creative director for the performance. Kapsis performed with four other dancers, including Theo B. Koefoed, Thomas Hegnet, Sebastian Laurentius Nielsen, and Martin Daugaard. The Eurovision performance featured Kapsis wearing a white-coloured crop top and trousers, with a mixture of red and green LEDs serving as the background. A background displaying swirls of water circles was also shown. "Liar" finished in sixth, scoring 67 points and securing a position in the grand final.

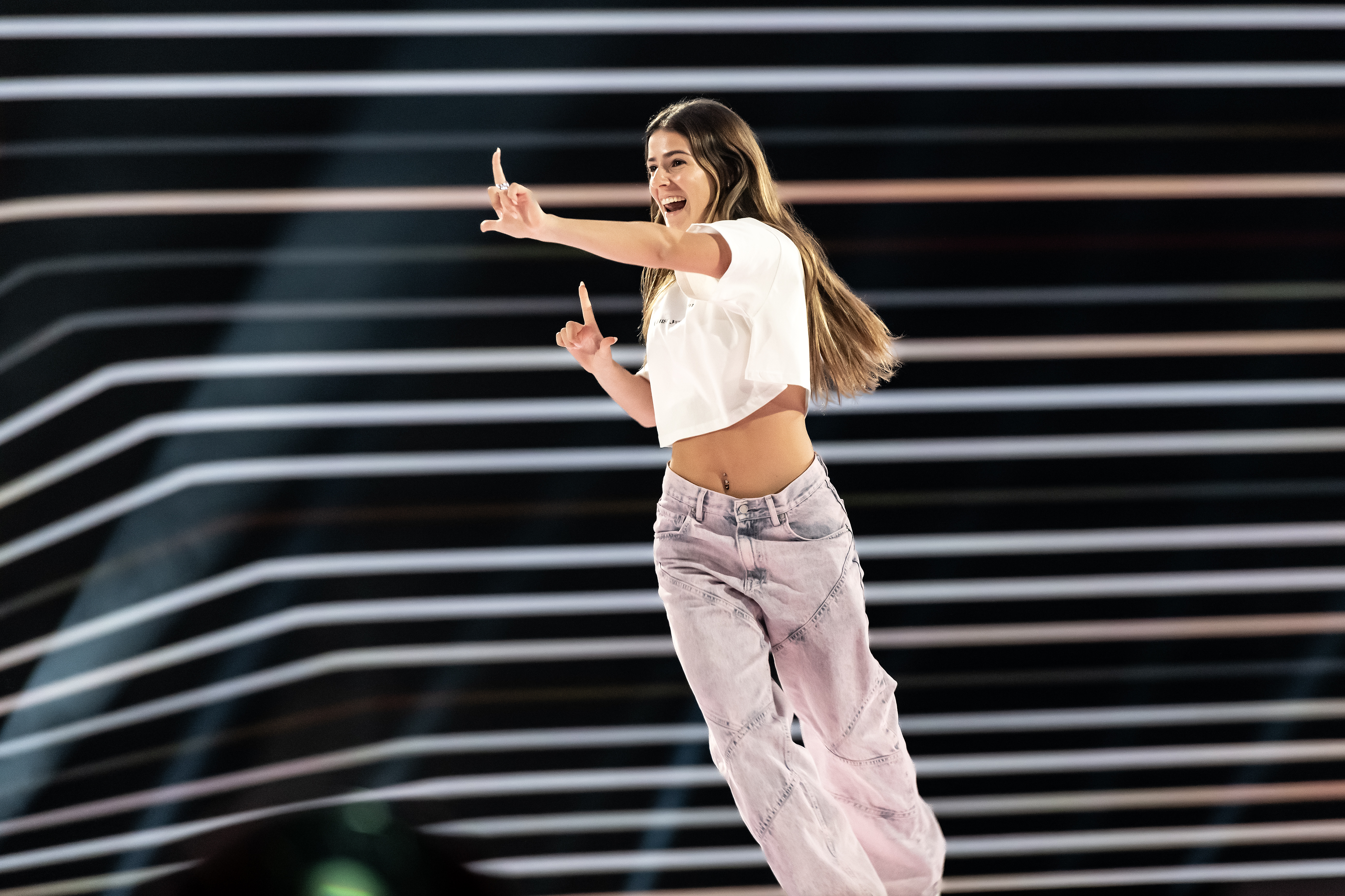
Kapsis performing "Liar" at a dress rehearsal before the Eurovision 2024 grand final.

Kapsis performed a repeat of her performance in the grand final on 11 May. The song was performed 20th in the grand final, ahead of Armenia's Ladaniva and before Switzerland's Nemo Mettler. After the results were announced, Kapsis finished in 15th with 78 points, with a split score of 34 points from juries and 44 points from televoting. Regarding the former, the song did not receive any set of the maximum 12 points; the highest any country gave it was 10 points, with it coming from Greece. One set of 12 points was awarded to the song from televoting; the set also came from Greece.

== Charts ==
Chart performance for "Liar"
Chart (2024)	Peak position
Greece International (IFPI)	17
Lithuania (AGATA)	25
Sweden Heatseeker (Sverigetopplistan)	6
UK Singles Downloads (Official Charts)	37
UK Singles Sales (OCC)	37

== Release history ==
Release history and formats for "Liar"
Country	Date	Format(s)	Version	Label	Ref.
Various	29 February 2024	Digital download; streaming	Original	K2ID Productions	
Various	18 April 2024	Digital download; streaming	Acoustic	K2ID Productions	
Various	26 April 2024	Digital download; streaming	Liran Shoshan remixes	K2ID Productions	
