= Shh (Theo Evan song) =

2025 song by Theo Evan

Single by Theo Evan
- Released: 11 March 2025
- Genre: Trance; Techno; electro-industrial
- Length: 2:57
- Label: K2ID Productions
- Composers: Dimitris Kontopoulos; Elsie Bay; Lasse Nymann; Linda Dale
- Lyricist: Elke Tiel
- Producers: Lasse Nymann; Dimitris Kontopoulos

Theo Evan singles chronology
"Fading Dreams" (2024)	"Shh" (2025)	"Diafanis" (2025)

Music videos
- "Shh" on YouTube "Shh" (acoustic version) on YouTube

Eurovision Song Contest 2025 entry
- Country: Cyprus
- Artist: Theo Evan
- Language: English
- Composers: Dimitris Kontopoulos; Elsie Bay; Lasse Nymann; Linda Dale
- Lyricist: Elke Tiel

Finals performance
- Semi-final result: 11th
- Semi-final points: 44

Entry chronology
- ◄ "Liar" (2024)
- "Jalla" (2026) ►

Official performance video
- "Shh" (first semi-final) on YouTube

"Shh" is a song by Cypriot singer and songwriter Theo Evan, written by Dimitris Kontopoulos, Elke Tiel, Elsie Bay, Lasse Nymann, and Linda Dale. It was released on 11 March 2025 and represented Cyprus in the Eurovision Song Contest 2025.

== Background and composition ==
"Shh" was written by Dimitris Kontopoulos, Elke Tiel, Elsie Bay, Lasse Nymann, and Linda Dale. The song and its onstage performance are inspired by the Vitruvian Man.

== Eurovision Song Contest ==
=== Internal selection ===
In July 2024, it was reported that the search for the Cypriot representative for the 2025 contest was underway, and that CyBC intended to select an entrant who – unlike the country's representatives in 2023 (Andrew Lambrou) and 2024 (Silia Kapsis) – was based in Cyprus. The selection was carried out by a focus group composed of music professionals and Eurovision experts. By late August 2024, the artist and song had reportedly been selected, with the entrant, Theo Evan, announced on 2 September. The song "Shh" was released on 11 March.

=== At Eurovision ===
The Eurovision Song Contest 2025 took place at St. Jakobshalle in Basel, Switzerland, and consisted of two semi-finals held on the respective dates of 13 and 15 May and the final on 17 May 2025. During the allocation draw held on 28 January 2025, Cyprus was drawn to compete in the first semi-final, performing in the second half of the show. They failed to qualify for the Grand Final.
