= The Voice of Greece season 5 =

The Voice of Greece
- Season 5
- Hosted by: Giorgos Kapoutzidis; Laura Narjes
- Coaches: Helena Paparizou; Sakis Rouvas; Kostis Maraveyas; Panos Mouzourakis
- Winner: Lemonia Beza
- Winning coach: Kostis Maraveyas
- Runner-up: Marina Jungwirth

Release
- Original network: Skai TV; Sigma TV
- Original release: October 2 – December 20, 2018

Season chronology
- ← Previous; Season 4 Next → Season 6

The fifth season of the Greek Cypriot reality talent show The Voice of Greece premiered on October 2, 2018 on Skai TV. Based on the reality singing competition The Voice of Holland, the series was created by Dutch television producer John de Mol. It is part of an international series.

On September 19, 2017, Skai TV confirmed that the presenter, the backstage host and the coaches of the previous season would return.

Lemonia Bezais was announced as the winner of the season, marking Kostis Maraveyas's third consecutive and final win as a coach. Also, for the first time in The Voice of Greece's history, a stolen artist went on to win the entire season.

== Selection process ==
The Pre-Auditions or Pre-Casting begins from Thessaloniki and ended in Athens.

Auditions with Producers
City	Date(s)	Venue
Thessaloniki	6–7 August	The Excelsior Thessaloniki
Thessaloniki	16–17 September	City Hotel
Nicosia, Cyprus	1–2 September	Diachronic Music Scene
Athens	5–6 September	Galatsi Olympic Hall
Athens	13 October	Galatsi Olympic Hall
Athens	14 September	Athenaeum Grand Hotel
Athens	21 September	Athenaeum Grand Hotel

== Teams ==
Color key

- Winner
- Runner-up
- Third place
- Fourth place
- Eliminated in Live Shows
- Eliminated in Playoffs
- Stolen in the Knockout rounds
- Eliminated in The Knockouts
- Stolen in the Battle rounds
- Eliminated in the Battle rounds
- Withdrew

Coaches	Top 152 artists				
Kostis Maraveyas					
Kostis Maraveyas	Lemonia Beza	Maria Ieronimaki	Giannis Panouklias	Theano Sakalidou	Marios Kapilidis
Kostis Maraveyas	Maria Vasilopoulou	Giannis Adamopoulos	Iro Zervoudi	Rachel Cassar	Elena Founda
Kostis Maraveyas	Vangelis Patilas	Konstantina Mortoglou	Lidia Kalogianni	Konstantina Mortoglou	Eirini Angelaki
Kostis Maraveyas	Stefanos Vezirgianopoulos	Sofia Margariti	Efthimis Kollitiris	Kleoniki Karanikola	Christina Thanoglou
Kostis Maraveyas	Maria Ieronimaki	Aspasia Votsidi	Stratoula Chioti	Antonis Athanasiou	Stefania Goundoura
Kostis Maraveyas	Elena Founda	~~Kiriaki Sachinidou~~	Elli Manoli	Elina Baga	Nikos Kartsonakis
Kostis Maraveyas	Aristea Goureza	Antonis Skarpetas	Viki Lingou	Vangelis Patilas	Danai Panagiotou
Kostis Maraveyas	Marialena Kapeki	Vallia Eirinaiou	Nasos Lavranos	Aristotelis Sparis	Doris Theodoridi
Kostis Maraveyas	Evfimia Koullia	Agoustina Roustemi	Georgia Dimitrakou	Christina Dritsa	Giannis Skamnakis
Sakis Rouvas					
Sakis Rouvas	Marina Jungwirth	Louis Panagiotou	Nasos Angeletos	Dimitra Theofanidi	Eirini Kalamaraki
Sakis Rouvas	Panagiotis Papageorgiou	Chriso Dimitri	Aimilios Mosaidis	Xenofon Lafazanis	Stelios Karpathakis
Sakis Rouvas	Chris Brian Karakasidis	Dimitra Ioli Exarchou	~~Alexis Prevenas~~	Giannis Stilianou	Chris Brian Karakasidis
Sakis Rouvas	Tasos Georgoudios	Kiriakos Konstantinou	Chrisostomos Filaktou	Dimitra Ioli Exarchou	Konstantinos Prokopis
Sakis Rouvas	Kiriaki Sachinidou	Panagiotis Skalkeas	Dimitra Theofanidi	Konstantina Kelepouri	Dona Brachousai
Sakis Rouvas	Eirini Lambridou	~~Louis Panagiotou~~	~~Konstantinos Angelopoulos~~	~~Viki Lambidi~~	~~Aspasia Votsidi~~
Sakis Rouvas	Stelios Karpathakis	Thanasis Liberis	Stelios Gikopoulos	Elli Dadira	Nikos Agapiou
Sakis Rouvas	Amalia Tzitzi	Maira Iatrou	Eleni Vlachaki	Nikos Vrettos	Athina Mallia
Sakis Rouvas	Nikos Kipriotis	Christina Tasiouka	Dionisis Kostis	Giannis Spanelis	Danai Mastoraki
Helena Paparizou					
Helena Paparizou	Klavdia Papadopoulou	Ariadni Neofitou	Alexis Prevenas	Nikos Farfas	Andreas Ioannou
Helena Paparizou	Konstantinos Savvidis	Giorgos Vanas	Dafni Georgali	Stelios Giannakopoulos	Giannis Sotiropoulos
Helena Paparizou	Dimitra Sotiropoulou	Fotis Papazisis	~~Zeta Xafaki~~	~~Lemonia Beza~~	~~Louis Panagiotou~~
Helena Paparizou	Thanos Leivaditis	Margarita Stamouli	Lidia Vlachou	Yinka Williams	Christie Bell
Helena Paparizou	Marios Pastellis	Nikolina Galiadou	Antonis Kondos	Giorgos Semos	Giannis Sotiropoulos
Helena Paparizou	Avraam Intzevidis	~~Chrisostomos Filaktou~~	Fotis Papazisis	Evelina Pilara	Despina Stamelou
Helena Paparizou	Christiana Vatista	Giorgos Vanas	Giannis Kotseridis	Dimitris Giannakopoulos	Lena Milona
Helena Paparizou	Stavrina Arvanitaki	Thenia Kevezitidou	Giorgos Astritis	Popi Efstathiou	Georgina Kalais
Helena Paparizou	Dimitra Sotiropoulou	Stelios Moschotoglou	Georgia Bouzika	Olga Kasapidou	Konstantina Metaxa
Panos Mouzourakis					
Panos Mouzourakis	Zachos Karambasis	Iraklis Famellos	Nearchos Evangelou	Konstantinos Angelopoulos	Anna Michailidou
Panos Mouzourakis	Tzoanna Karaoglou	Zeta Xafaki	Lia Giarleli	Sonia Siskina	Konstantina Iosifidou
Panos Mouzourakis	Emili Vivlaki	Dora Gega	Nikochristos Lambaounas	Thomas Skotidas	Jane
Panos Mouzourakis	Giolanda Amaxopoulou	Marina Maratou	Melina Xeni	Panagiotis Bourandonis	Viki Lambidi
Panos Mouzourakis	Alex Petidis	Odisseas Alexandridis	Lia Giarleli	Alkmini Orfanou	Konstantina Iosifidou
Panos Mouzourakis	Zoi Tzalavreta	~~Iro Zervoudi~~	~~Stelios Giannakopoulos~~	Lia Nikitopoulou	Dora Gega
Panos Mouzourakis	Panos Kalogirou	Panagiotis Omega	Panos Katsigiannis	Rene Dantsi	Elisavet Chrisopoulou
Panos Mouzourakis	Foteini Totli	Panagiota Vardiopoulou	Gabriela Bistogiannaki	Mirto Dekoli	Emili Vivlaki
Panos Mouzourakis	Elena Michalaki	Nasos Katsinas	Themis Angelidis	Giota Dimitrakopoulou	Lambrini Annisi
Note: Italicized names are stolen artists (names struck through within former teams). Underlined names are artists who were returned by their coach in the playoffs.

== Blind auditions ==
A new feature within the Blind Auditions this season is the Block, which each coach can use four time to prevent one of the other coaches from getting a contestant.

Blind Auditions began filming on September 26, 2018. The episodes began airing on October 2, 2018, being broadcast every Tuesday, Wednesday and Thursday on Skai TV and Sigma TV.

Color key

✔	Coach hit his/her "ΣΕ ΘΕΛΩ (I want you)" button
	Artist defaulted to this coach's team
	Artist elected to join this coach's team
	Artist eliminated with no coach pressing his or her "ΣΕ ΘΕΛΩ (I want you)" button
✘	Coach pressed the "ΣΕ ΘΕΛΩ (I want you)" button, but was blocked by Panos from getting the artist
✘	Coach pressed the "ΣΕ ΘΕΛΩ (I want you)" button, but was blocked by Helena from getting the artist (Note: Elena never Blocked another coach.)
✘	Coach pressed the "ΣΕ ΘΕΛΩ (I want you)" button, but was blocked by Sakis from getting the artist
✘	Coach pressed the "ΣΕ ΘΕΛΩ (I want you)" button, but was blocked by Kostis from getting the artist

=== Episode 1 (October 2) ===
The first blind audition episode was broadcast on October 2, 2018.

Order	Artist	Age	Song	Coach's and contestant's choices			
Order	Artist	Age	Song	Kostis	Sakis	Elena	Panos
1	Iro Zervoudi	19	"Empire State of Mind"	–	–	–	✔
2	Matthaios Kouimtsidis	21	"Patrida m' araevo se"	–	–	–	–
3	Giorgos Astritis	35	"Come Together"	–	✔	✔	–
4	Christiana Nero	22	"Perhaps"	–	–	–	–
5	Nasos Angeletos	19	"Einai kati laika"	–	✔	–	–
6	Aristea Goureza	21	"Afou to thes"	✔	✔	✔	–
7	Chen Chen Song	25	"Ain't No Mountain High Enough"	–	–	–	–
8	Marialena Kapeki	19	"Bella ciao"	✔	–	✔	✔
9	Anastasia Antonopoulou	20	"Otan sou chorevo"	–	–	–	–
10	Christina Tasiouka	31	"O mio babbino caro"	✔	✔	✔	✔
11	Eleni Anastasiadou	25	"Cups"	–	–	–	–
12	Maria Vasilopoulou	30	"Natural Woman"	✔	✔	✔	✔
13	Marina Jungwirth	17	"Say Something"	✔	✔	✔	✔
14	Yinka Williams	29	"Shape of You"	✔	✔	✔	–
15	Vasiliki Panaretou	20	"I Will Survive"	–	–	–	–
16	Stelios Moschotoglou	21	"S' agapo"	–	–	✔	–
17	Marietta Vasilaki	24	"There Are Worse Things I Could Do"	–	–	–	–
18	Marina Maratou	27	"Gigolo"	–	✔	–	✔

=== Episode 2 (October 3) ===
The second blind audition episode was broadcast on October 3, 2018.

Order	Artist	Age	Song	Coach's and contestant's choices			
Order	Artist	Age	Song	Kostis	Sakis	Elena	Panos
1	Magda Tsanaksidou	24	"Misise me"	–	–	–	–
2	Konstantinos Kakaris	39	"Treno fantasma"	–	–	–	–
3	Konstantina Metaxa	30	"Den einai pou fevgeis"	–	–	✔	–
4	Makis Meras	20	"Stin kardia"	–	–	–	–
5	Giannis Skamnakis	34	"Yellow"	✔	✔	✔	–
6	Katerina Tsouloufi	27	"To trito stefani"	–	–	–	–
7	Aimilios Mosaidis	26	"Thimos"	–	✔	–	–
8	Giorgos Vanas	41	"You Give Love a Bad Name"	✔	✔	✔	–
9	Nikos Pappas	18	"Don't"	–	–	–	–
10	Zoi Tzalavreta	38	"Nací en Alamó"	✔	–	–	✔
11	Kiriakos Konstantinou	27	"Cry Me a River"	✔	✔	✔	✔
12	Margarita Stamouli	19	"We Don't Talk Anymore"	–	✔	✔	✔
13	Sabrina Matola	24	"Upside Down"	–	–	–	–
14	Stelios Giannakopoulos	18	"Stitches"	✔	✔	✔	✔
15	Kirillos Diamantidis	36	"Ego milao gia dinami"	–	–	–	–
16	Vangelis Papakostas	36	"Here I Go Again"	–	–	–	–
17	Christina Dritsa	24	"Makria mou na feigeis"	✔	–	–	✔

=== Episode 3 (October 9) ===
The third blind audition episode was broadcast on October 9, 2018.

Order	Artist	Age	Song	Coach's and contestant's choices			
Order	Artist	Age	Song	Kostis	Sakis	Elena	Panos
1	Charianna Meremeti	29	"Meds"	–	–	–	–
2	Melina Xeni	19	"Ochi de tha boreso"	–	–	–	✔
3	Kiriakos Chambidis Domi	40	"Numb"	–	–	–	–
4	Nikos Agapiou	27	"Emena thes"	–	✔	–	✔
5	Evi Koskina	20	"Se poia thalassa armenizeis"	–	–	–	–
6	Marios Kapilidis	22	"Den zitao polla"	✔	✔	–	–
7	Nearchos Evangelou	25	"Radioactive"	✔	✔	✔	✔
8	Eleni Griva	29	"Ragisa"	–	–	–	–
9	Giannis Sotiropoulos	26	"Enas aetos"	✔	✔	✔	–
10	Odisseas Alexandridis	21	"Fix You"	–	✔	–	✔
11	Despoina Stamelou	18	"Love on the Brain"	✔	✘	✔	✔
12	Giolanda Amaxopoulou	19	"Friends"	–	✔	✔	✔
13	Klairi Ioannou	18	"Something's Got a Hold on Me"	–	–	–	–
14	Stefania Goundoura	30	"Erota mou anepanalipte"	✔	–	✔	–

=== Episode 4 (October 10) ===
The fourth blind audition episode was broadcast on October 10, 2018.

Order	Artist	Age	Song	Coach's and contestant's choices			
Order	Artist	Age	Song	Kostis	Sakis	Elena	Panos
1	Penni Liberopoulou	19	"Poso Lypame"	–	–	–	–
2	Nikos Kartsonakis	34	"Vradia Aximerota"	✔	–	–	–
3	Haris Anagnostou	20	"Gia Paradigma"	–	–	–	–
4	Danai Mastoraki	19	"Zombie"	–	✔	–	–
5	Nikos Farfas	34	"Metrisa"	–	✔	✔	–
6	Irini Rafail	28	"Hilies Vradies"	–	–	–	–
7	Tzoana Karaoglou	18	"Creep"	–	–	–	✔
8	Konstantina Mortoglou	27	"O Prigkipas Alitis"	✔	✔	–	–
9	Manos Makropoulos	33	"Fila Me"	–	–	–	–
10	Panagiotis Omega	26	"Thelo Na Giriso"	✔	–	–	✔
11	Giorgos Bozatzidis	27	"Lipisou Me"	–	–	–	–
12	Staurina Arvanitaki	18	"Leave Me Alone"	–	✔	✔	✔
13	Nasos Lavranos	34	"Mulino A Vento"	✔	✘	✔	✔
14	Alex Petidis	20	"Sing For The Moment"	–	✔	–	✔
15	Nikos Zagkas	28	"Best Of You"	–	–	–	–
16	Andreas Ioannou	20	"O Dikos Mou O Dromos"	–	✔	✔	–

=== Episode 5 (October 11) ===
The fifth blind audition episode was broadcast on October 11, 2018.

Order	Artist	Age	Song	Coach's and contestant's choices			
Order	Artist	Age	Song	Kostis	Sakis	Elena	Panos
1	Elli Dadira	40	"Zelatina"	–	✔	–	✔
2	Sotiris Bourlios	31	"Hush"	–	–	–	–
3	Dafni Georgali	33	"Amado Mio"	–	✔	✔	✔
4	Theano Sakalidou	19	"Man Down"	✔	✔	✔	✔
5	Stefanos Kakkos	27	"Suspicious Minds"	–	–	–	–
6	Emili Vivlaki	18	"Higher"	✔	✔	✔	✔
7	Theo Xristidis	29	"Omologo"	–	–	–	–
8	Giorgos Semos	33	"Mera Nyxta"	✔	✔	✔	–
9	Christiana Eystathiou	24	"Dirty Diana"	–	–	–	–
10	Chriso Dimitri	37	"Fos"	✔	✔	✔	✔
11	Thomas Skotidas	49	"To Mathima"	✔	✔	–	✔
12	Giannis Kotseridis	35	"Sou Milo Kai Kokkinizis"	–	✔	✔	–
13	Maria Papadopoulou	21	"Na Me Afiseis Isixi Thelo"	–	–	–	–
14	Klavdia Papadopoulou	17	"Roxanne"	✔	✔	✔	✘ ^1
15	Vallia Eirineou	37	"Kaigomai Kaigomai"	✔	✔	✔	–
16	Giannis Kounelis	18	"Ola Miazoun Kalokairi"	–	–	–	–
17	Lia Giarleli	22	"Havana"	✔	✔	✘	✔

^1: Kostis tried to block Panos, but Elena pressed it before him.

=== Episode 6 (October 16) ===
The sixth blind audition episode was broadcast on October 16, 2018.

Order	Artist	Age	Song	Coach's and contestant's choices			
Order	Artist	Age	Song	Kostis	Sakis	Elena	Panos
1	Melina Karamousouli	19	"Locked Out Of Heaven"	–	–	–	–
2	Panagiotis Skalkeas	18	"Otan Ta Xronia Sou Perasoun"	–	✔	–	–
3	Giota Reggina	27	"Ela Pou Fovamai"	–	–	–	–
4	Eythimis Kollitiris	30	"I Put A Spell On You"	✔	✔	✔	–
5	Antreas Kofou	30	"Na Loipon Giati S' Agapisa"	–	–	–	–
6	Xenofon Lafazanis	30	"Iparho"	–	✔	–	–
7	Alexandra Tsounaka	23	"Xana Mana"	–	–	–	–
8	Evelina Pilara	19	"Believer"	✔	–	✔	–
9	Elena Founta	23	"Mirela"	✔	✔	✔	–
10	Eirini Tsekoura - Tounta	49	"O Amarados"	–	–	–	–
11	Fotini Totli	20	"I'm Not The Only One"	–	–	–	✔
12	Giannis Stilianou	28	"Tis Arnis To Nero"	✘	✔	✔	✔
13	Avraam Intzevidis	32	"Augerinos"	✔	✔	✔	✔
14	Kristia Kagga	36	"Lady Marmalade"	–	–	–	–
15	Panagiota Vardiopoulou	25	"Think"	–	✔	✔	✔
16	Konstantina Dalla	30	"Ziliaris Ouranos"	–	–	–	–

=== Episode 7 (October 17) ===
The seventh blind audition episode was broadcast on October 17, 2018.

Order	Artist	Age	Song	Coach's and contestant's choices			
Order	Artist	Age	Song	Kostis	Sakis	Elena	Panos
1	Christina Spiropoulou	22	"Dio Meres Mono"	–	–	–	–
2	Georgia Bouzika	19	"Umbrella"	–	–	✔	–
3	Marilia Mitrousi	23	"Sidero Me Atmo"	–	–	–	–
4	Eirini Aggelaki	17	"Mia Kori Roda Emazone"	✔	–	–	–
5	Mairi Xronopoulou	53	"Tha Kleiso Ta Matia"	–	–	–	–
6	Panagiotis Bouradonis	24	"Spasmeno Karavi"	✔	–	–	✔
7	Chrisa Pavlidou	28	"Deytera Kleidia"	–	–	–	–
8	Danai Panagiotou	21	"En Leyko"	✔	–	–	–
9	Eirini Agapitou	21	"Rouxo Daniko"	–	–	–	–
10	Maira Iatrou	28	"Ase Me Na S' Agapo"	–	✔	–	✔
11	Themis Aggelidis	26	"Chasing Cars"	–	–	–	✔
12	Christie Bell	28	"Bad Girls"	✔	✔	✔	✔
13	Ioanna Terzaki	24	"I Want To Know What Love Is"	–	–	–	–
14	Chris Brian Karakasidis	21	"The Kill (Bury Me)"	–	✔	–	–
15	Argiro Dimakopoulou	23	"Ximeroni"	–	–	–	–

=== Episode 8 (October 18) ===
The eighth blind audition episode was broadcast on October 18, 2018.

Order	Artist	Age	Song	Coach's and contestant's choices			
Order	Artist	Age	Song	Kostis	Sakis	Elena	Panos
1	Eleni Vavanou	27	"Isos Ftaine Ta Feggaria"	–	–	–	–
2	Leonidas Pantelakis	29	"Oso Exo Esena"	–	–	–	–
3	Zahos Karabasis	42	"Akou"	–	–	–	✔
4	Alexandros Graikos	19	"Ethniki Odos"	–	–	–	–
5	Doris Theodoridi	25	"Bad Romance"	✔	✔	–	–
6	Alper Tekin	37	"Misirlou"	–	–	–	–
7	Iraklis Famelos	30	"Souxediariko"	–	✔	–	✔
8	Giannis Merkourakis	27	"Dithessio"	–	–	–	–
9	Lemonia Beza	29	"I Malamo"	–	–	✔	✔
10	Ioanna Gkogkou	19	"Rehab"	–	–	–	–
11	Louis Panagiotou	25	"Walking on Sunshine"	–	✔	–	✔
12	Thenia Kevezitidou	18	"Can't Help Falling In Love"	–	✔	✔	✔
13	Konstantina Iosifidou	18	"Scared To Be Lonely"	✔	✔	✘	✔
14	Konstantinos Aggelopoulos	23	"Tha Kano Diakopes"	–	–	–	–
15	Panagiotis Papageorgiou	39	"Frozen"	–	✔	✔	–

=== Episode 9 (October 23) ===
The ninth blind audition episode was broadcast on October 23, 2018.

Order	Artist	Age	Song	Coach's and contestant's choices			
Order	Artist	Age	Song	Kostis	Sakis	Elena	Panos
1	Ioanna Karousou	32	"Krata Gia To Telos"	–	–	–	–
2	Konstantinos Maniatis	32	"Mas Ipoxreoses"	–	–	–	–
3	Viki Labidi	24	"Will You Still Love Me Tomorrow"	–	✔	✔	–
4	Giota Dimitrakopoulou	27	"Walking With A Ghost"	–	–	–	✔
5	Stelios Tsesmelis	22	"Kati Mou Krivis"	–	–	–	–
6	Giannis Adamopoulos	30	"Wanted Dead Or Alive"	✔	✔	✔	–
7	Nefeli Anazikou	17	"Ciao Adios"	–	–	–	–
8	Eirini Kalamaraki	26	"Dimitroyla Mou"	✔	✔	✔	–
9	Elina Baga	46	"Stand By Me"	✔	–	–	–
10	Despina Gialouri	30	"Mia Xameni Kiriaki"	–	–	–	–
11	Nasos Katsinas	31	"Sofita"	✔	–	–	✔
12	Prokopis Pako Politis	44	"Delilah"	–	–	–	–
13	Christiana Vatista	21	"La Bohème"	–	–	✔	✔
14	Dimitris Nikoletakis	24	"Stab Me"	–	–	–	–
15	Sonia	24	"F**kin' Perfect"	✔	✔	✔	✔
16	Konstantinos Kikinas	37	"Se Stiamo Insieme"	–	–	–	–
17	Lina Papadioti	21	"Tris Eyxes"	–	–	–	–
18	Panos Kalogirou	27	"Gia Senane Mporo"	–	✔	–	✔

=== Episode 10 (October 24) ===
The tenth blind audition episode was broadcast on October 24, 2018.

Order	Artist	Age	Song	Coach's and contestant's choices			
Order	Artist	Age	Song	Kostis	Sakis	Elena	Panos
1	Anastasia Tzortzi	22	"Fight Song"	–	–	–	–
2	Stefanos Vezyrgianopoulos	19	"Hurt"	✔	–	–	–
3	Eleni Georgiou	21	"Ton Idio To Theo"	–	–	–	–
4	Amalia Tzitzi	20	"I'd Rather Go Blind"	–	✔	–	–
5	Maria Sternara	23	"Mercy"	–	–	–	–
6	Myrto Dekoli	41	"Post-Love"	–	✔	–	✔
7	Aspasia Fragkoulopoulou	30	"Lay Down Sally"	–	–	–	–
8	Nikos Vrettos	29	"Tis Nyxtes Ntynomai Paidi"	–	✔	–	–
9	Thanos Makris	23	"Fyge"	–	–	–	–
10	Kyriaki Saxinidou	19	"Billie Jean"	✔	✔	–	–
11	Melania Marinou	32	"Maracaibo"	–	–	–	–
12	Nikoxristos Lampaounas	34	"Happy End"	–	–	–	✔
13	Dionysis Triantafylli	20	"Sta Xilia Xronia Mia Fora"	–	–	–	–
14	Xrysostomos Fylaktou	33	"Historia De Un Amor"	–	✔	✔	✔
15	Xanthoula Aggelinou	27	"Exartatai"	–	–	–	–
16	Antonis Athanasiou	26	"O Amlet Tis Selinis"	✔	✔	✔	✔
17	Natalia Tzegka	17	"Russian Roulette"	–	–	–	–
18	Eleni Marina Karpen	20	"Fighter"	–	–	–	–
19	Giannis Panouklias	38	"Kaixis"	✔	–	✔	✔

=== Episode 11 (October 25) ===
The eleventh blind audition episode was broadcast on October 25, 2018.

Order	Artist	Age	Song	Coach's and contestant's choices			
Order	Artist	Age	Song	Kostis	Sakis	Elena	Panos
1	Panagiota Ioannou	23	"Subeme La Radio"	–	–	–	–
2	Antonis Skarpetas	30	"Tosa Xronia Mia Anasa"	✔	–	–	–
3	Giannis Magklaras	36	"Ela Na Deis"	–	–	–	–
4	Giannis Spanelis	35	"Ti Exeis Kaimene Platane"	–	✔	–	✔
5	Sofia Oratiou	25	"Sober"	–	–	–	–
6	Elli Manoli	26	"Parea"	✔	✔	✔	–
7	Christos Foskolos	21	"To Soma Pou Zitas"	–	–	–	–
8	Jane	21	"Idontwannabeyouanymore"	–	✔	–	✔
9	Alexandros Tsalapatanis	36	"Pou'nai Ta Xronia"	–	–	–	–
10	Rachel Cassar	36	"You Oughta Know"	✔	✔	✔	✔
11	Aggelina Valsami	20	"Respect"	–	–	–	–
12	Dimitris Giannakopoulos	33	"It's A Sin"	–	✔	✔	–
13	Anna Mihailidou	17	"Hallelujah"	✔	✔	✔	✔
14	Athanasios Mourtiadis	38	"Tin Agapousa Paradexomai"	–	–	–	–
15	Leyki Stylianou	45	"S'Exo Vrei Kai Se Xano"	–	–	–	–
16	Alexis Prevenas	32	"Stin Kardia"	–	✔	✔	–

=== Episode 12 (October 30) ===
The twelfth blind audition episode was broadcast on October 30, 2018.

Order	Artist	Age	Song	Coach's and contestant's choices			
Order	Artist	Age	Song	Kostis	Sakis	Elena	Panos
1	Mara Arxodaki	17	"Wicked Game"	–	–	–	–
2	Athina Mallia	25	"Pali Tha Klapso"	–	✔	–	–
3	Nektarios Sfakianakis	28	"Giati To Metanioneis"	–	–	–	–
4	Stratoula Xioti	32	"Xorisame Ena Deilino"	✔	✔	–	–
5	Giorgos Chrisos	21	"Ma Pou Na Pao"	–	–	–	–
6	Popi Eystathiou	35	"To Keri Mas Esvise"	–	–	✔	–
7	Panagiotis Krassas	27	"Comme Ci Comme Ca"	–	–	–	–
8	Aristotelis Sparis	38	"Tha Spaso Koupes"	✔	✔	✔	–
9	Dionysis Kostis	37	"Angels"	✘	✔	✔	✔
10	Leyteris Kritikos	36	"Heimonanthos"	–	–	–	–
11	Zeta Xafaki	28	"I Who Have Nothing"	✔	✔	✔	–
12	Mairi Triadafyllou	25	"Highway To Hell"	–	–	–	–
13	Maria Ieronymaki	25	"Pista Apo Fosforo"	✔	✔	✔	✔
14	Lia Nikitopoulou	23	"Kamia Fora"	✔	✔	–	✔
15	Konstantinos Ntatis	29	"Syntages Mageirikis"	–	–	–	–
16	Thanos Leivaditis	22	"Pyrosvestiras"	–	✔	✔	–
17	Giannis Vlaseros	38	"Dust In The Wind"	–	–	–	–

=== Episode 13 (October 31) ===
The thirteenth blind audition episode was broadcast on October 31, 2018.

Order	Artist	Age	Song	Coach's and contestant's choices			
Order	Artist	Age	Song	Kostis	Sakis	Elena	Panos
1	Sabrien Mari	25	"Rolling In The Deep"	–	–	–	–
2	Lena Mylona	21	"Milo Mou Kokkino"	–	–	✔	–
3	Georgia Dimitrakou	18	"Royals"	✔	–	–	✔
4	Ilias Mayraeidis	32	"Ki Emeina Edo"	–	–	–	–
5	Konstantinos Aggelopoulos	26	"Ap'to Aeroplano"	–	✔	–	–
6	Eirini Liapikou	27	"Colombiano"	–	–	–	–
7	Fotis Papazisis	24	"Aggigma Psixis"	–	✔	✔	–
8	Manos Loidis	35	"Aponi Kardia"	–	–	–	–
9	Ariadni Neofytou	17	"We Don't Have To Take Our Clothes Off"	–	✔	✔	✔
10	Konstantinos Xystouris	31	"Ilie Mou Se Parakalo"	–	–	–	–
11	Tasos Georgoudios	24	"Ela Ilie Mou"	–	✔	✔	–
12	Lydia Kalogianni	17	"Stone Cold"	✔	✔	✔	✔
13	Gabriella	25	"Toxic"	–	✔	–	✔
14	Maria Geladari	17	"An Eisai Ena Asteri"	–	–	–	–

=== Episode 14 (November 1) ===
The fourteenth blind audition episode was broadcast on November 1, 2018.

Order	Artist	Age	Song	Coach's and contestant's choices			
Order	Artist	Age	Song	Kostis	Sakis	Elena	Panos
1	Alexandra Zaxou	21	"Milo Gia Sena"	–	–	–	–
2	Konstantina Kelepouri	18	"Vasiliki"	–	✔	–	–
3	Mihalis Xenofontos	23	"Leyki Kataigida"	–	–	–	–
4	Elisavet Chrisopoulou	36	"Den Iparxoun Aggeloi"	–	–	–	✔
5	Stamos Lykos	23	"Mercy"	–	–	–	–
6	Kleoniki Karanikola	30	"Pes Mou Pos Ginetai"	✔	–	✔	–
7	Nikos Anagnostopoulos	45	"Kripse Me"	–	–	–	–
8	Marios Pastellis	27	"San Planodio Tsirko"	✔	✔	✔	–
9	Despina Pasxali	17	"Piece By Piece"	–	–	–	–
10	Aspasia Votsidi	19	"Skinny Love"	–	✔	–	✔
11	Giannis Theotokis	39	"Thimose Apopse H Kardia"	–	–	–	–
12	Panos Katsigiannis	49	"Thalassa"	–	–	–	✔
13	Maria Alevizou	23	"Ela Kai Ragise Ton Kosmo Mou"	–	–	–	–
14	Agkoustina Roustemi	17	"I Could Have Danced All Night"	✔	–	–	–
15	Peni Markantoni	32	"Down On My Knees"	–	–	–	–
16	Dona Mprahousai	17	"When I Was Your Man"	✔	✔	✔	✔
17	Spyros Poulos	32	"Ahrista Rologia"	–	–	–	–
18	Nikolina Galiadou	23	"Enas Erotas Ftinos"	–	–	✔	✔

=== Episode 15 (November 6) ===
The fifteenth blind audition episode was broadcast on November 6, 2018.

Order	Artist	Age	Song	Coach's and contestant's choices			
Order	Artist	Age	Song	Kostis	Sakis	Elena	Panos
1	Simela Christopoulou	30	"To Kalitero Psema"	–	–	–	–
2	Fotis Xenakis	33	"Tha Me Thimithis"	–	–	–	–
3	Dimitra Ioli Exarhou	28	"I Sklava"	–	✔	✔	–
4	Marios Kapnias	34	"Ena Karavi"	–	–	–	–
5	Olga Kasapidou	30	"Mi Girizeis Pia"	–	–	✔	–
6	Maria Stai	18	"Kopse Kai Mirase"	–	–	–	–
7	Viki Liggou	23	"Bang Bang"	✔	✔	–	✔
8	Panagiotis Zapounidis	20	"Pote"	–	–	–	–
9	Eirini Labridou	26	"Just Hold Me"	–	✔	–	–
10	Lydia Vlahou	24	"Runnin'"	–	–	✔	✔
11	Despina Herouvi	24	"Anoixe Anoixe"	–	–	–	–
12	Rene Dantsi	18	"Redbone"	✘	✔	✔	✔
13	Valia Dimou	25	"What Is Love"	–	–	–	–
14	Stelios Karpathakis	52	"It's A Man's Man's Man's World"	✔	✔	✔	✔
15	Eleni Fandridou	17	"Wish You Were Here "	–	–	–	–
16	Vaggelis Patilas	35	"Shape Of My Heart"	✔	–	–	–
17	Nasos Psimadas	25	"I Won't Let You Go"	–	–	–	–

=== Episode 16 (November 7) ===
The sixteenth blind audition episode was broadcast on November 7, 2018.

Order	Artist	Age	Song	Coach's and contestant's choices			
Order	Artist	Age	Song	Kostis	Sakis	Elena	Panos
1	Katerina Margaritopoulou	23	"Stasou Ligo"	–	–	–	–
2	Antonis Kodos	22	"Me Kotsakia Fanerono"	–	–	✔	–
3	Aggeliki Anastasiou	22	"I Diathiki"	–	–	–	–
4	Stelios Gkikopoulos	36	"Ego Na Deis"	–	✔	–	✔
5	Ieremias Konstantinos Tsiflidis	23	"Psemata"	–	–	–	–
6	Dora Gkegka	19	"Halo"	–	–	–	✔
7	Elpida Maria Koutsopoulou	26	"Min Anisixeis"	–	–	–	–
8	Christina Thanoglou	18	"Stepping Stone"	✔	✔	–	–
9	Christos Maggioris	30	"Istoria Mou"	–	–	–	–
10	Thanasis Liberis	35	"Den Xero Giati"	–	✔	–	–
11	Matina Kopsolemi	22	"Ain't No Other Man"	–	–	–	–
12	Dimitra Sotiropoulou	26	"Mia Fora Kai Ena Kairo"	–	✔	✔	✔
13	Athina	27	"That Don't Impress Me Much"	–	–	–	–
14	Dimitra Theofanidi	24	"Disco Inferno"	✔	✔	✔	–
15	Natasa Theohari	24	"An Kano Atakti Zoi"	–	–	–	–
16	Elena Michalaki	30	"I Sotiria Tis Psihis"	–	–	–	✔
17	Mihalis Iosifidis	19	"To Kima"	–	–	–	–

=== Episode 17 (November 8) ===
The seventeenth blind audition episode was broadcast on November 8, 2018.

Order	Artist	Age	Song	Coach's and contestant's choices			
Order	Artist	Age	Song	Kostis	Sakis	Elena	Panos
1	Aspasia Tzanou	30	"Karadi"	–	–	–	–
2	Alkmini Orfanou	20	"Unfaithful"	✔	–	–	✔
3	Giannis Shetakis	21	"Jealous"	–	–	–	–
4	Georgina Kalais	32	"Jumpin' Jack Flash"	–	✔	✔	–
5	Alexandros Metallinos	27	"Ayra"	–	–	–	–
6	Konstantinos Prokopis	28	"Nihta Einai Tha Perasi"	–	✔	✘	–
7	Miriam	21	"Human Nature"	–	–	–	–
8	Eyfimia Koullia	36	"Den Thelo Na Xereis"	✔	✔	✔	✔
9	Eleni Vlahaki	23	"Who's Lovin You"	✔	✔	✔	✔
10	Kiriakos Spartalis	20	"Giati"	–	–	–	–
11	Nikol Dalekou	35	"Gkazi"	–	–	–	–
12	Konstantinos Savvidis	29	"Anestaki"	–	✔	✔	–
13	Sofia Margariti	20	"Taxidi Stin Vroxi"	✔	–	Team full	–
14	Nikos Kipriotis	30	"Skoni"	Team full	✔	Team full	✔
15	Eleni Atmatzidi	18	"Os Ki H Thalasses"	Team full	Team full	Team full	–
16	Theohanthi Filaktou	25	"H Tabakiera"	Team full	Team full	Team full	–
17	Labrini Annisi	23	"Think Of Me"	Team full	Team full	Team full	✔

== Battle rounds ==
The Battle Rounds started on November 13, 2018. After announcing Danai Mastoraki's withdrawal from the competition, Sakis Rouvas grouped three of his team members into one battle, in which two contestants from the trio advanced, with the third eliminated. After announcing Konstantina Metaxa's withdrawal from the competition, Helena Paparizou grouped three of her team members into one battle, in which two contestants from the trio advanced, with the third eliminated. After announcing Giannis Skamnakis's withdrawal from the competition, Kostis Maraveyas grouped three of his team members into one battle, in which two contestants from the trio advanced, with the third eliminated. The coaches can steal two losing artists from other coaches. Contestants who win their battle or are stolen by another coach will advance to the Knockout rounds.

Colour key

✔	Coach hit his/her "I WANT YOU" button
	Artist won the Battle and advanced to the Knockouts
	Artist lost the Battle but was stolen by another coach and advances to the Knockouts
	Artist lost the Battle and was eliminated

Episode	Coach	Order	Winner(s)	Song	Loser	'Steal' result			
Episode	Coach	Order	Winner(s)	Song	Loser	Kostis	Sakis	Elena	Panos
Episode 18 (November 13, 2018)	Helena Paparizou	1	Giorgos Semos	"De Milame"	Olga Kasapidou	–	–	—N/a	–
Episode 18 (November 13, 2018)	Sakis Rouvas	2	Xenofon Lafazanis	"Vrehei Fotia Sti Strata Mou"	Giannis Spanelis	–	—N/a	–	–
Episode 18 (November 13, 2018)	Kostis Maraveyas	3	Stratoula Xioti	"Den Xero Poso S' Agapo"	Christina Dritsa	—N/a	–	–	–
Episode 18 (November 13, 2018)	Panos Mouzourakis	4	Panagiotis Bouradonis	"S' Eho Kanei Theo"	Labrini Annisi	–	–	–	—N/a
Episode 18 (November 13, 2018)	Sakis Rouvas	5	Chris Brian Karakasidis	"Beds Are Burning"	Dionysis Kostis	–	—N/a	–	–
Episode 18 (November 13, 2018)	Helena Paparizou	6	Yinka Williams	"No Roots"	Georgia Bouzika	–	–	—N/a	–
Episode 18 (November 13, 2018)	Kostis Maraveyas	7	Eirini Aggelaki	"I Epimoni Sou"	Georgia Dimitrakou	—N/a	–	–	–
Episode 18 (November 13, 2018)	Sakis Rouvas	8	Marina Tziangouirth	"Read All About It"	Aspasia Votsidi	✔	—N/a	–	✔
Episode 18 (November 13, 2018)	Panos Mouzourakis	9	Alex Petidis	"Gangsta's Paradise"	Giota Dimitrakopoulou	–	–	–	—N/a
Episode 18 (November 13, 2018)	Helena Paparizou	10	Zeta Xafaki	"Ena Filaki Einai Ligo"	Xrysostomos Fylaktou	✔	✔	—N/a	✔
Episode 18 (November 13, 2018)	Kostis Maraveyas	11	Lydia Kalogianni	"Get Lucky"	Agkoustina Roustemi	—N/a	–	–	–
Episode 18 (November 13, 2018)	Helena Paparizou	12	Marios Pastellis	"Moro Mou"	Stelios Moschotoglou	–	–	—N/a	–
Episode 18 (November 13, 2018)	Panos Mouzourakis	13	Anna Mihailidou	"Sign Of The Times"	Themis Aggelidis	–	–	–	—N/a
Episode 19 (November 14, 2018)	Kostis Maraveyas	1	Konstantina Mortoglou	"Thalassaki Mou"	Eyfimia Koullia	—N/a	–	–	–
Episode 19 (November 14, 2018)	Sakis Rouvas	2	Dimitra Ioli Exarhou	"There Must Be An Angel"	Christina Tasiouka	–	—N/a	–	–
Episode 19 (November 14, 2018)	Sakis Rouvas	2	Chriso Dimitri	"There Must Be An Angel"	Christina Tasiouka	–	—N/a	–	–
Episode 19 (November 14, 2018)	Helena Paparizou	3	Nikos Farfas	"The Blower's Daughter"	Dimitra Sotiropoulou	–	–	—N/a	–
Episode 19 (November 14, 2018)	Panos Mouzourakis	4	Nikoxristos Lampaounas	"Platanos"	Nasos Katsinas	–	–	–	—N/a
Episode 19 (November 14, 2018)	Kostis Maraveyas	5	Giannis Adamopoulos	"Perfect Duet"	Doris Theodoridi	—N/a	–	–	–
Episode 19 (November 14, 2018)	Sakis Rouvas	6	Eirini Labridou	"Be My Baby"	Viki Labidi	–	—N/a	–	✔
Episode 19 (November 14, 2018)	Helena Paparizou	7	Klavdia Papadopoulou	"One"	Georgina Kalais	–	–	—N/a	–
Episode 19 (November 14, 2018)	Panos Mouzourakis	8	Iraklis Famelos	"Sti Rogmi Toy Hronoy"	Elena Mihalaki	–	–	–	—N/a
Episode 19 (November 14, 2018)	Sakis Rouvas	9	Aimilios Mosaïdis	"Mi Giriseis"	Konstantinos Aggelopoulos	✔	—N/a	–	✔
Episode 19 (November 14, 2018)	Kostis Maraveyas	10	Giannis Panouklias	"Thee Moy Megalodyname"	Aristotelis Sparis	—N/a	–	–	Team full
Episode 19 (November 14, 2018)	Panos Mouzourakis	11	Yiolanda Amaxopoulou	"Cryin'"	Emili Vivlaki	–	–	–	Team full
Episode 20 (November 15, 2018)	Panos Mouzourakis	1	Zoe Tsalavreta	"To Heirokrotima"	Myrto Dekoli	–	–	–	Team full
Episode 20 (November 15, 2018)	Sakis Rouvas	2	Konstantinos Prokopis	"Rixe Kokkino Sti Nihta"	Nikos Kipriotis	–	—N/a	–	Team full
Episode 20 (November 15, 2018)	Helena Paparizou	3	Avraam Intzevidis	"Enas Erotas Megalos"	Popi Eystathiou	–	–	—N/a	Team full
Episode 20 (November 15, 2018)	Kostis Maraveyas	4	Stefanos Vezyrgianopoulos	"City Of Stars"	Kyriaki Saxinidou	—N/a	✔	✔	Team full
Episode 20 (November 15, 2018)	Sakis Rouvas	5	Panagiotis Skalkeas	"To Dilitirio"	Athina Mallia	–	Team full	–	Team full
Episode 20 (November 15, 2018)	Kostis Maraveyas	6	Theano Sakalidou	"Kisses Of Fire"	Nasos Lavranos	—N/a	Team full	–	Team full
Episode 20 (November 15, 2018)	Panos Mouzourakis	7	Sonia Siskina	"Mad About You"	Gabriella Bistogiannaki	–	Team full	–	Team full
Episode 20 (November 15, 2018)	Helena Paparizou	8	Thanos Leivaditis	"Tasis Katastrofis"	Yiorgos Astritis	–	Team full	—N/a	Team full
Episode 20 (November 15, 2018)	Kostis Maraveyas	9	Kleoniki Karanikola	"Sou Milo Kai Kokkinizis"	Vallia Eirineou	—N/a	Team full	–	Team full
Episode 20 (November 15, 2018)	Panos Mouzourakis	10	Odysseas Alexandridis	"Happy"	Stelios Yiannakopoulos	✔	Team full	✔	Team full
Episode 20 (November 15, 2018)	Sakis Rouvas	11	Tasos Georgoudios	"Prin To Telos"	Nikos Vrettos	–	Team full	–	Team full
Episode 20 (November 15, 2018)	Helena Paparizou	12	Margarita Stamouli	"Girls Just Want To Have Fun"	Thenia Kevezitidou	–	Team full	—N/a	Team full
Episode 20 (November 15, 2018)	Panos Mouzourakis	13	Lia Giarleli	"Piece Of My Heart"	Panagiota Vardiopoulou	–	Team full	–	Team full
Episode 21 (November 20, 2018)	Panos Mouzourakis	1	Alkmini Orfanou	"Let It Go"	Fotini Totli	–	Team full	–	Team full
Episode 21 (November 20, 2018)	Kostis Maraveyas	2	Antonis Athanasiou	"Ta Lianotragouda"	Marialena Kapeki	—N/a	Team full	–	Team full
Episode 21 (November 20, 2018)	Helena Paparizou	3	Lydia Vlahou	"Price Tag"	Stavrina Arvanitaki	–	Team full	—N/a	Team full
Episode 21 (November 20, 2018)	Sakis Rouvas	4	Kyriakos Konstantinou	"Dusk Till Dawn"	Eleni Vlahaki	–	Team full	–	Team full
Episode 21 (November 20, 2018)	Panos Mouzourakis	5	Zachos Karambasis	"Me Les Agapi"	Elisavet Chrisopoulou	–	Team full	–	Team full
Episode 21 (November 20, 2018)	Helena Paparizou	6	Konstantinos Savvidis	"De Thelo Tetious Filous"	Lena Milona	–	Team full	—N/a	Team full
Episode 21 (November 20, 2018)	Helena Paparizou	6	Antonis Kondos	"De Thelo Tetious Filous"	Lena Milona	–	Team full	—N/a	Team full
Episode 21 (November 20, 2018)	Kostis Maraveyas	7	Elena Founda	"Nyxterini Ekpobi"	Danai Panagiotou	—N/a	Team full	–	Team full
Episode 21 (November 20, 2018)	Sakis Rouvas	8	Dimitra Theofanidi	"Shallow"	Louis Panagiotou	–	Team full	✔	Team full
Episode 21 (November 20, 2018)	Panos Mouzourakis	9	Jane	"Addicted To Love"	Rene Dantsi	–	Team full	Team full	Team full
Episode 21 (November 20, 2018)	Helena Paparizou	10	Christie Bell	"Proud Mary"	Dimitris Giannakopoulos	–	Team full	Team full	Team full
Episode 21 (November 20, 2018)	Sakis Rouvas	11	Eirini Kalamaraki	"Anoixi"	Maira Iatrou	–	Team full	Team full	Team full
Episode 21 (November 20, 2018)	Panos Mouzourakis	12	Thomas Skotidas	"Garifalle"	Panos Katsigiannis	–	Team full	Team full	Team full
Episode 21 (November 20, 2018)	Kostis Maraveyas	13	Maria Vasilopoulou	"You Are Everything"	Vangelis Patilas	—N/a	Team full	Team full	Team full
Episode 22 (November 21, 2018)	Kostis Maraveyas	1	Christina Thanoglou	"Love Is A Losing Game"	Viki Lingou	—N/a	Team full	Team full	Team full
Episode 22 (November 21, 2018)	Helena Paparizou	2	Giannis Sotiropoulos	"Psithiroi Kardias"	Giannis Kotseridis	–	Team full	Team full	Team full
Episode 22 (November 21, 2018)	Sakis Rouvas	3	Dona Brachousai	"Rockabye"	Amalia Tzitzi	–	Team full	Team full	Team full
Episode 22 (November 21, 2018)	Kostis Maraveyas	4	Marios Kapilidis	"Ta Therina Sinema"	Antonis Skarpetas	—N/a	Team full	Team full	Team full
Episode 22 (November 21, 2018)	Kostis Maraveyas	4	Sofia Margariti	"Ta Therina Sinema"	Antonis Skarpetas	—N/a	Team full	Team full	Team full
Episode 22 (November 21, 2018)	Panos Mouzourakis	5	Nearchos Evangelou	"Afou Sou To 'Pa"	Panagiotis Omega	–	Team full	Team full	Team full
Episode 22 (November 21, 2018)	Sakis Rouvas	6	Giannis Stilianou	"Ola Pernoun"	Nikos Agapiou	–	Team full	Team full	Team full
Episode 22 (November 21, 2018)	Helena Paparizou	7	Dafni Georgali	"Daimones"	Giorgos Vanas	–	Team full	Team full	Team full
Episode 22 (November 21, 2018)	Kostis Maraveyas	8	Stefania Goundoura	"Ximeroni Kai Vradiazei"	Aristea Goureza	—N/a	Team full	Team full	Team full
Episode 22 (November 21, 2018)	Panos Mouzourakis	9	Marina Maratou	"Adistrofi Metrisi"	Panos Kalogirou	–	Team full	Team full	Team full
Episode 22 (November 21, 2018)	Helena Paparizou	10	Andreas Ioannou	"To Tragoudi Tou Chari II"	Christiana Vatista	–	Team full	Team full	Team full
Episode 22 (November 21, 2018)	Sakis Rouvas	11	Konstantina Kelepouri	"O Aggelos Mou"	Elli Dadira	–	Team full	Team full	Team full
Episode 23 (November 22, 2018)	Helena Paparizou	1	Ariadni Neofitou	"Send My Love"	Despina Stamelou	–	Team full	Team full	Team full
Episode 23 (November 22, 2018)	Sakis Rouvas	2	Alexis Prevenas	"Prin To Xarama"	Stelios Gikopoulos	–	Team full	Team full	Team full
Episode 23 (November 22, 2018)	Kostis Maraveyas	3	Maria Ieronimaki	"Pare Me Apopse Pare Me"	Nikos Kartsonakis	—N/a	Team full	Team full	Team full
Episode 23 (November 22, 2018)	Panos Mouzourakis	4	Konstantina Iosifidou	"One More Cup Of Coffee"	Dora Gega	–	Team full	Team full	Team full
Episode 23 (November 22, 2018)	Helena Paparizou	5	Nikolina Galiadou	"New Rules"	Evelina Pilara	–	Team full	Team full	Team full
Episode 23 (November 22, 2018)	Sakis Rouvas	6	Nasos Angeletos	"Tis Dikaiosinis Hlie Noite"	Thanasis Liberis	–	Team full	Team full	Team full
Episode 23 (November 22, 2018)	Kostis Maraveyas	7	Rachel Cassar	"The Honeymoon Song"/"An Thimitheis T' Oneiro Mou"	Elina Baga	—N/a	Team full	Team full	Team full
Episode 23 (November 22, 2018)	Panos Mouzourakis	8	Tzoanna Karaoglou	"Do It Like A Dude"	Iro Zervoudi	✔	Team full	Team full	Team full
Episode 23 (November 22, 2018)	Helena Paparizou	9	Lemonia Beza	"Kokkino Garifallo"	Fotis Papazisis	Team full	Team full	Team full	Team full
Episode 23 (November 22, 2018)	Sakis Rouvas	10	Panagiotis Papageorgiou	"Another One Bites The Dust"	Stelios Karpathakis	Team full	Team full	Team full	Team full
Episode 23 (November 22, 2018)	Kostis Maraveyas	11	Efthimis Kollitiris	"Hey Jude"	Elli Manoli	Team full	Team full	Team full	Team full
Episode 23 (November 22, 2018)	Panos Mouzourakis	12	Melina Xeni	"Ximeroni Pali"	Lia Nikitopoulou	Team full	Team full	Team full	Team full

== Knockouts ==
The knockouts started on November 27, 2018. The coaches can each steal one losing artist from another team. Contestants who win their knockout or are stolen by another coach will advance to the Live Shows.

Colour key

✔	Coach hit his/her "I WANT YOU" button
	Artist won the Knockout and advanced to the Live Shows
	Artist lost the Knockout but was stolen by another coach and advances to the Live Shows
	Artist lost the Knockout and was eliminated

Episode	Coach	Order	Winner		Losers		'Steal' result			
Episode	Coach	Order	Artist	Song	Artists	Song	Kostis	Sakis	Elena	Panos
Episode 24 (November 27, 2018)	Kostis Maraveyas	1	Maria Vasilopoulou	"Zitate Na Sas Po"	Elena Founda	"Patoma"	—N/a	–	–	–
Episode 24 (November 27, 2018)	Kostis Maraveyas	1	Maria Vasilopoulou	"Zitate Na Sas Po"	Stefania Goundoura	"Htane Aeras"	—N/a	–	–	–
Episode 24 (November 27, 2018)	Panos Mouzourakis	2	Sonia Siskina	"Once In The Street"	Zoi Tzalavreta	"Like The Way I Do"	–	–	–	—N/a
Episode 24 (November 27, 2018)	Panos Mouzourakis	2	Sonia Siskina	"Once In The Street"	Konstantina Iosifidou	"Someone Like You"	–	–	–	—N/a
Episode 24 (November 27, 2018)	Helena Paparizou	3	Konstantinos Savvidis	"Xenos Gia Senane Ki Ehthros"	Avraam Intzevidis	"Anathema Se"	–	–	—N/a	–
Episode 24 (November 27, 2018)	Helena Paparizou	3	Konstantinos Savvidis	"Xenos Gia Senane Ki Ehthros"	Giannis Sotiropoulos	"Pote Voudas Pote Koudas"	–	–	—N/a	–
Episode 24 (November 27, 2018)	Sakis Rouvas	4	Marina Jungwirth	"Hurt"	Eirini Lambridou	"Teardrops"	–	—N/a	–	–
Episode 24 (November 27, 2018)	Sakis Rouvas	4	Marina Jungwirth	"Hurt"	Dona Brachousai	"Everytime We Touch"	–	—N/a	–	–
Episode 24 (November 27, 2018)	Kostis Maraveyas	5	Marios Kapilidis	"Gia Pou To 'Vales Kardia Mou"	Antonis Athanasiou	"I Dimosthenous Lexis"	—N/a	–	–	–
Episode 24 (November 27, 2018)	Kostis Maraveyas	5	Marios Kapilidis	"Gia Pou To 'Vales Kardia Mou"	Stratoula Chioti	"Prosopa"	—N/a	–	–	–
Episode 24 (November 27, 2018)	Panos Mouzourakis	6	Anna Michailidou	"Ashes"	Alkmini Orfanou	"Take Me To Church"	–	–	–	—N/a
Episode 24 (November 27, 2018)	Panos Mouzourakis	6	Anna Michailidou	"Ashes"	Lia Giarleli	"Expectations"	–	–	–	—N/a
Episode 24 (November 27, 2018)	Helena Paparizou	7	Andreas Ioannou	"I Nihta Dyo Kommatia"	Giorgos Semos	"Pos Na To Exigiso"	–	–	—N/a	–
Episode 24 (November 27, 2018)	Helena Paparizou	7	Andreas Ioannou	"I Nihta Dyo Kommatia"	Antonis Kondos	"Kai Me Pianoun Ta Klamata"	–	–	—N/a	–
Episode 24 (November 27, 2018)	Sakis Rouvas	8	Eirini Kalamaraki	"Something's Got A Hold On Me"	Konstantina Kelepouri	"Mi Ton Rotas Ton Ourano"	–	—N/a	–	–
Episode 24 (November 27, 2018)	Sakis Rouvas	8	Eirini Kalamaraki	"Something's Got A Hold On Me"	Dimitra Theofanidi	"Superstition"	–	—N/a	–	–
Episode 24 (November 27, 2018)	Kostis Maraveyas	9	Giannis Panouklias	"Proino Tsigaro"	Aspasia Votsidi	"Efiges Noris"	—N/a	–	–	–
Episode 24 (November 27, 2018)	Kostis Maraveyas	9	Giannis Panouklias	"Proino Tsigaro"	Maria Ieronimaki	"Thalassaki Mou"	—N/a	–	–	–
Episode 25 (November 28, 2018)	Helena Paparizou	1	Stelios Giannakopoulos	"Eimai Allou"	Nikolina Galiadou	"Matono"	–	–	—N/a	–
Episode 25 (November 28, 2018)	Helena Paparizou	1	Stelios Giannakopoulos	"Eimai Allou"	Marios Pastellis	"Mi Mou Les Adio"	–	–	—N/a	–
Episode 25 (November 28, 2018)	Kostis Maraveyas	2	Giannis Adamopoulos	"Irtha Ki Apopse Sta Skalopatia Sou"	Christina Thanoglou	"Kiss Me"	—N/a	–	–	–
Episode 25 (November 28, 2018)	Kostis Maraveyas	2	Giannis Adamopoulos	"Irtha Ki Apopse Sta Skalopatia Sou"	Kleoniki Karanikola	"T' Aneipota"	—N/a	–	–	–
Episode 25 (November 28, 2018)	Sakis Rouvas	3	Nasos Angeletos	"De Feygo"	Panagiotis Skalkeas	"Pou Na Exigo"	–	—N/a	–	–
Episode 25 (November 28, 2018)	Sakis Rouvas	3	Nasos Angeletos	"De Feygo"	Kiriaki Sachinidou	"Fila Me"	–	—N/a	–	–
Episode 25 (November 28, 2018)	Panos Mouzourakis	4	Nearchos Evangelou	"Love Me Again"	Odisseas Alexandridis	"Death Of A Bachelor"	–	–	–	—N/a
Episode 25 (November 28, 2018)	Panos Mouzourakis	4	Nearchos Evangelou	"Love Me Again"	Alex Petidis	"Uptown Funk"	–	–	–	—N/a
Episode 25 (November 28, 2018)	Helena Paparizou	5	Ariadni Neofitou	"Beautiful"	Christie Bell	"Mi Tierra"	–	–	—N/a	–
Episode 25 (November 28, 2018)	Helena Paparizou	5	Ariadni Neofitou	"Beautiful"	Yinka Williams	"Bleeding Love"	–	–	—N/a	–
Episode 25 (November 28, 2018)	Sakis Rouvas	6	Chriso Dimitri	"Alone"	Konstantinos Prokopis	"Den Eimai Allos"	–	—N/a	–	–
Episode 25 (November 28, 2018)	Sakis Rouvas	6	Chriso Dimitri	"Alone"	Dimitra Ioli Exarchou	"Time To Say Goodbye"	–	—N/a	–	–
Episode 25 (November 28, 2018)	Panos Mouzourakis	7	Iraklis Famellos	"O Palios Stratiotis"	Viki Lambidi	"Ego S' Agapisa Edo"	–	–	–	—N/a
Episode 25 (November 28, 2018)	Panos Mouzourakis	7	Iraklis Famellos	"O Palios Stratiotis"	Panagiotis Bourandonis	"As' Ta Ola Ki Ela"	–	–	–	—N/a
Episode 25 (November 28, 2018)	Helena Paparizou	8	Klavdia Papadopoulou	"Feeling Good"	Lidia Vlachou	"Love The Way You Lie"	–	–	—N/a	–
Episode 25 (November 28, 2018)	Helena Paparizou	8	Klavdia Papadopoulou	"Feeling Good"	Louis Panagiotou	"All Of Me"	–	✔	—N/a	–
Episode 25 (November 28, 2018)	Kostis Maraveyas	9	Iro Zervoudi	"Turning Tables"	Efthimis Kollitiris	"Dance With Somebody"	—N/a	Team full	–	–
Episode 25 (November 28, 2018)	Kostis Maraveyas	9	Iro Zervoudi	"Turning Tables"	Sofia Margariti	"Tifles Elpides"	—N/a	Team full	–	–
Episode 26 (November 29, 2018)	Panos Mouzourakis	1	Zachos Karambasis	"Ta Veggalika Sou Matia"	Melina Xeni	"Mes Sto Spiti De Menei Kaneis"	–	Team full	–	—N/a
Episode 26 (November 29, 2018)	Panos Mouzourakis	1	Zachos Karambasis	"Ta Veggalika Sou Matia"	Marina Maratou	"O, ti Kai Na Eimai"	–	Team full	–	—N/a
Episode 26 (November 29, 2018)	Kostis Maraveyas	2	Rachel Cassar	"Big Spender"	Stefanos Vezirgianopoulos	"Make You Feel My Love"	—N/a	Team full	–	–
Episode 26 (November 29, 2018)	Kostis Maraveyas	2	Rachel Cassar	"Big Spender"	Eirini Angelaki	"To Metrima"	—N/a	Team full	–	–
Episode 26 (November 29, 2018)	Sakis Rouvas	3	Panagiotis Papageorgiou	"Unchain My Heart"	Chrisostomos Filaktou	"Agapa Me"/"Abrazame"	–	Team full	–	–
Episode 26 (November 29, 2018)	Sakis Rouvas	3	Panagiotis Papageorgiou	"Unchain My Heart"	Kiriakos Konstantinou	"Sorry Seems To Be The Hardest Word"	–	Team full	–	–
Episode 26 (November 29, 2018)	Panos Mouzourakis	4	Tzoanna Karaoglou	"Blue Jeans"	Giolanda Amaxopoulou	"Iparhei Logos"	–	Team full	–	—N/a
Episode 26 (November 29, 2018)	Panos Mouzourakis	4	Tzoanna Karaoglou	"Blue Jeans"	Jane	"Bodak Yellow"	–	Team full	–	—N/a
Episode 26 (November 29, 2018)	Sakis Rouvas	5	Aimilios Mosaidis	"Caruso"	Tasos Georgoudios	"Min Tis To Peis"	–	Team full	–	–
Episode 26 (November 29, 2018)	Sakis Rouvas	5	Aimilios Mosaidis	"Caruso"	Chris Brian Karakasidis	"Personal Jesus"	–	Team full	–	–
Episode 26 (November 29, 2018)	Kostis Maraveyas	6	Theano Sakalidou	"Black Velvet"	Konstantina Mortoglou	"De Thelo Pia Na Xanartheis"	—N/a	Team full	–	–
Episode 26 (November 29, 2018)	Kostis Maraveyas	6	Theano Sakalidou	"Black Velvet"	Lidia Kalogianni	"Ola Ayta Pou Fovamai"	—N/a	Team full	–	–
Episode 26 (November 29, 2018)	Sakis Rouvas	7	Xenofon Lafazanis	"Feggari Mou Xlomo"	Alexis Prevenas	"Spasmena Kommatia Tis Kardias"	–	Team full	✔	–
Episode 26 (November 29, 2018)	Sakis Rouvas	7	Xenofon Lafazanis	"Feggari Mou Xlomo"	Giannis Stilianou	"My Way"	–	Team full	Team full	–
Episode 26 (November 29, 2018)	Helena Paparizou	8	Dafni Georgali	"Youkali"	Lemonia Beza	"Woman In Love"	✔	Team full	Team full	–
Episode 26 (November 29, 2018)	Helena Paparizou	8	Dafni Georgali	"Youkali"	Zeta Xafaki	"All That Jazz"	Team full	Team full	Team full	✔
Episode 26 (November 29, 2018)	Panos Mouzourakis	9	Konstantinos Angelopoulos	"O Kipouros"	Thomas Skotidas	"It's Now Or Never"	Team full	Team full	Team full	Team full
Episode 26 (November 29, 2018)	Panos Mouzourakis	9	Konstantinos Angelopoulos	"O Kipouros"	Nikochristos Lambaounas	"Logia Logia (Mia Statistiki)"	Team full	Team full	Team full	Team full
Episode 26 (November 29, 2018)	Helena Paparizou	10	Nikos Farfas	"Giati Den Erxesai Pote"	Margarita Stamouli	"La Vie En Rose"	Team full	Team full	Team full	Team full
Episode 26 (November 29, 2018)	Helena Paparizou	10	Nikos Farfas	"Giati Den Erxesai Pote"	Thanos Leivaditis	"Ta Karavia Mou Kaio"	Team full	Team full	Team full	Team full

== Playoffs ==
The playoffs started on December 4, 2018. In the extra episode of The Voice of Greece, the coaches can bring 4 players that eliminated in the Battles or in the Knockouts and will give their best to convince their coach that they have to go to Live Shows. Only one of each team will go to Lives and so every coach will have 9 and not 8 players in their teams.

Color key
– Contestant was eliminated
– Contestant was advanced to the Live Shows

Coach	Order	Artist	Song	Result
Kostis Maraveyas	1	Konstantina Mortoglou	"Mama Do"	Eliminated
Kostis Maraveyas	2	Maria Ieronimaki	"Ayti I Nihta Menei"	Advanced
Kostis Maraveyas	3	Vangelis Patilas	"Emmalene (That's No Lie)"	Eliminated
Kostis Maraveyas	4	Elena Founda	"Erotiko"	Eliminated
Helena Paparizou	1	Fotis Papazisis	"Paraponemena Logia"	Eliminated
Helena Paparizou	2	Dimitra Sotiropoulou	"Trava Skandali"	Eliminated
Helena Paparizou	3	Giorgos Vanas	"Let Me Entertain You"	Advanced
Helena Paparizou	4	Giannis Sotiropoulos	"O Ilios"	Eliminated
Sakis Rouvas	1	Dimitra Ioli Exarchou	"Ti Einai Ayto Pou To Lene Agapi"	Eliminated
Sakis Rouvas	2	Chris Brian Karakasidis	"Believe"	Eliminated
Sakis Rouvas	3	Dimitra Theofanidi	"Listen"	Advanced
Sakis Rouvas	4	Stelios Karpathakis	"Bohemian Rhapsody"	Eliminated
Panos Mouzourakis	1	Dora Gega	"Come Together"	Eliminated
Panos Mouzourakis	2	Emili Vivlaki	"I Want To Hold Your Hand"	Eliminated
Panos Mouzourakis	3	Lia Giarleli	"Oh! Darling"	Advanced
Panos Mouzourakis	4	Konstantina Iosifidou	"While My Guitar Gently Weeps"	Eliminated

== Live shows ==
=== Results summary ===
Color key
Artist's info

- Artist from "Team Kostis"
- Artist from "Team Sakis"
- Artist from "Team Helena"
- Artist from "Team Panos"

Result details

- Winner
- Runner-up
- Third place
- Fourth place
- Artist was saved by the public
- Artist was eliminated
- Artist did not perform on that particular week

Artist	Week 1		Week 2		Week 3		
Artist	Wednesday	Thursday	Tuesday	Wednesday	Round 1	Round 2	Round 3
Lemonia Beza		Safe		Safe	Safe	Safe	Winner
Marina Jungwirth	Safe			Safe	Safe	Safe	Runner-up
Maria Ieronimaki		Safe	Safe		Safe	3rd Place	Eliminated in the Final; Round 2
Louis Panagiotou	Safe		Safe		Safe	3rd Place	Eliminated in the Final; Round 2
Klavdia Papadopoulou		Safe	Safe		4th Place	Eliminated in the Final; Round 1	
Ariadni Neofitou		Safe		Safe	4th Place	Eliminated in the Final; Round 1	
Alexis Prevenas	Safe		Safe		4th Place	Eliminated in the Final; Round 1	
Zachos Karambasis	Safe			Safe	4th Place	Eliminated in the Final; Round 1	
Andreas Ioannou	Safe			Eliminated	Eliminated (Week 2)		
Theano Sakalidou		Safe		Eliminated	Eliminated (Week 2)		
Iraklis Famellos		Safe		Eliminated	Eliminated (Week 2)		
Nikos Farfas		Safe		Eliminated	Eliminated (Week 2)		
Giannis Panouklias	Safe			Eliminated	Eliminated (Week 2)		
Anna Michailidou		Safe	Eliminated	Eliminated (Week 2)			
Maria Vasilopoulou	Safe		Eliminated	Eliminated (Week 2)			
Konstantinos Angelopoulos		Safe	Eliminated	Eliminated (Week 2)			
Nearchos Evangelou	Safe		Eliminated	Eliminated (Week 2)			
Marios Kapilidis	Safe		Eliminated	Eliminated (Week 2)			
Panagiotis Papageorgiou		Eliminated	Eliminated (Week 1)				
Eirini Kalamaraki		Eliminated	Eliminated (Week 1)				
Giorgos Vanas		Eliminated	Eliminated (Week 1)				
Zeta Xafaki		Eliminated	Eliminated (Week 1)				
Konstantinos Savvidis		Eliminated	Eliminated (Week 1)				
Giannis Adamopoulos		Eliminated	Eliminated (Week 1)				
Dimitra Theofanidi		Eliminated	Eliminated (Week 1)				
Nasos Angeletos		Eliminated	Eliminated (Week 1)				
Tzoanna Karaoglou		Eliminated	Eliminated (Week 1)				
Iro Zervoudi	Eliminated	Eliminated (Week 1)					
Lia Giarleli	Eliminated	Eliminated (Week 1)					
Chriso Dimitri	Eliminated	Eliminated (Week 1)					
Aimilios Mosaidis	Eliminated	Eliminated (Week 1)					
Dafni Georgali	Eliminated	Eliminated (Week 1)					
Stelios Giannakopoulos	Eliminated	Eliminated (Week 1)					
Rachel Cassar	Eliminated	Eliminated (Week 1)					
Xenofon Lafazanis	Eliminated	Eliminated (Week 1)					
Sonia Siskina	Eliminated	Eliminated (Week 1)					

=== Live show details ===
The live shows took place in the Galatsi Olympic Hall in Galatsi, Attica.

Color key

Artist was saved by the public's vote
Artist was eliminated by the public's vote
Artist procaimed as the winner
Artis proclaimed as runner-up

==== Week 1 ====
===== Cross Battle 1 (December 5) =====
Duel	Order	Coach	Artist	Song	Public Vote	Result
I	1	Sakis Rouvas	Louis Panagiotou	"Chandelier"	90%	Saved
I	2	Panos Mouzourakis	Sonia Siskina	"Tou Erota Simadi"	10%	Eliminated
II	3	Helena Paparizou	Alexis Prevenas	"Den Eho Polla"	62%	Saved
II	4	Sakis Rouvas	Xenofon Lafazanis	"Ena Gramma"	38%	Eliminated
III	5	Panos Mouzourakis	Zachos Karambasis	"To Systima Einai Enoho"	54%	Saved
III	6	Kostis Maraveyas	Rachel Cassar	"Nothing Compares 2 U"	46%	Eliminated
IV	7	Helena Paparizou	Stelios Giannakopoulos	"Love Yourself"	22%	Eliminated
IV	8	Panos Mouzourakis	Nearchos Evangelou	"Stay"	78%	Saved
V	9	Kostis Maraveyas	Maria Vasilopoulou	"A Change Is Gonna Come"	51%	Saved
V	10	Helena Paparizou	Dafni Georgali	"Pote Na Mi Hatheis Ap' Ti Zoi Mou"	49%	Eliminated
VI	11	Kostis Maraveyas	Giannis Panouklias	"Pou Na Vro Ginaika Na Sou Miazei"	61%	Saved
VI	12	Sakis Rouvas	Aimilios Mosaidis	"To Palio Mou Palto"	39%	Eliminated
VII	13	Helena Paparizou	Andreas Ioannou	"Ta Shoinia Sou"	63%	Saved
VII	14	Sakis Rouvas	Chriso Dimitri	"Sweet Child O' Mine"	37%	Eliminated
VIII	15	Panos Mouzourakis	Lia Giarleli	"O Vasilias Tis Skonis"	23%	Eliminated
VIII	16	Kostis Maraveyas	Marios Kapilidis	"Alexandria"	77%	Saved
IX	17	Kostis Maraveyas	Iro Zervoudi	"You Lost Me"	37%	Eliminated
IX	18	Sakis Rouvas	Marina Jungwirth	"Fallin'"	63%	Saved

===== Cross Battle 2 (December 6) =====
Duel	Order	Coach	Artist	Song	Public Vote	Result
I	1	Sakis Rouvas	Panagiotis Papageorgiou	"The Sound Of Silence"	49%	Eliminated
I	2	Panos Mouzourakis	Konstantinos Angelopoulos	"Tosa Kalokairia"	51%	Saved
II	3	Helena Paparizou	Nikos Farfas	"Losing My Religion"	53%	Saved
II	4	Sakis Rouvas	Eirini Kalamaraki	"I Will Always Love You"	47%	Eliminated
III	5	Helena Paparizou	Giorgos Vanas	"Under The Bridge"	17%	Eliminated
III	6	Kostis Maraveyas	Maria Ieronimaki	"Sto 'Pa Kai Sto Xanaleo"	83%	Saved
IV	7	Kostis Maraveyas	Theano Sakalidou	"As Erhosoun Gia Ligo"	68%	Saved
IV	8	Panos Mouzourakis	Zeta Xafaki	"Dyo Palta"	32%	Eliminated
V	9	Panos Mouzourakis	Iraklis Famellos	"S' Agapo San Amartia"	75%	Saved
V	10	Helena Paparizou	Konstantinos Savvidis	"Se Gireyo"	25%	Eliminated
VI	11	Kostis Maraveyas	Giannis Adamopoulos	"Theos An Einai"	45%	Eliminated
VI	12	Helena Paparizou	Ariadni Neofitou	"Dear Mr. President"	55%	Saved
VII	13	Sakis Rouvas	Dimitra Theofanidi	"Un Break My Heart"	41%	Eliminated
VII	14	Kostis Maraveyas	Lemonia Beza	"L'amour Est Un Oiseau Rebelle"	59%	Saved
VIII	15	Sakis Rouvas	Nasos Angeletos	"Eytihos Pou Iparheis"	42%	Eliminated
VIII	16	Panos Mouzourakis	Anna Michailidou	"Layla"	58%	Saved
IX	17	Helena Paparizou	Klavdia Papadopoulou	"Son Theo Eftago Tama"	64%	Saved
IX	18	Panos Mouzourakis	Tzoanna Karaoglou	"It's Oh So Quiet"	36%	Eliminated

==== Week 2 ====
===== Semi-Final 1 (December 11) =====
Order	Coach	Artist	Song	Result
1	Kostis Maraveyas	Maria Ieronimaki	"To Dihty"	Saved
2	Panos Mouzourakis	Anna Michailidou	"Mikros Titanikos"	Eliminated
3	Helena Paparizou	Alexis Prevenas	"Mia Nyhta Zoriki"	Saved
4	Kostis Maraveyas	Maria Vasilopoulou	"Otan Pinei Mia Gynaika"	Eliminated
5	Sakis Rouvas	Louis Panagiotou	"Ipirhes Panta"	Saved
6	Panos Mouzourakis	Konstantinos Angelopoulos	"Tha Pio Apopse To Feggari"	Eliminated
7	Helena Paparizou	Klavdia Papadopoulou	"Dangerous Woman"	Saved
8	Panos Mouzourakis	Nearchos Evangelou	"River"	Eliminated
9	Kostis Maraveyas	Marios Kapilidis	"An Mou Tilefonouses"	Eliminated

===== Semi-Final 2 (December 12) =====
Order	Coach	Artist	Song	Result
1	Kostis Maraveyas	Lemonia Beza	"Odos Oniron"	Saved
2	Helena Paparizou	Ariadni Neofitou	"I'm Not The Only One"	Saved
3	Panos Mouzourakis	Zachos Karambasis	"Roza"	Saved
4	Helena Paparizou	Andreas Ioannou	"Anapantita"	Eliminated
5	Sakis Rouvas	Marina Jungwirth	"I Have Nothing"	Saved
6	Kostis Maraveyas	Theano Sakalidou	"Eklapsa Xthes"	Eliminated
7	Panos Mouzourakis	Iraklis Famellos	"Treli Ki Adespoti"	Eliminated
8	Helena Paparizou	Nikos Farfas	"De Les Kouveda"	Eliminated
9	Kostis Maraveyas	Giannis Panouklias	"Arhisan Ta Organa"	Eliminated

==== Week 3 ====
===== Final (December 20) =====
Coach	Artist	Order	First Song	Order	Second Song	Order	Third Song	Result
Helena Paparizou	Ariadni Neofitou	1	"Back To Black"	N/A (already eliminated)				Fourth place
Kostis Maraveyas	Maria Ieronimaki	2	"Itane Mia Fora"	10	"Pista Apo Fosforo"	N/A (already eliminated)		Third place
Sakis Rouvas	Marina Jungwirth	3	"Anthropoi Monaxoi"	11	"Hurt"	13	"Fallin'"	Runner-up
Helena Paparizou	Klavdia Papadopoulou	4	"It's a Man's Man's Man's World"	N/A (already eliminated)				Fourth place
Panos Mouzourakis	Zachos Karambasis	5	"Petrina Chronia"	N/A (already eliminated)				Fourth place
Kostis Maraveyas	Lemonia Beza	6	"Pame Mia Volta Sto Feggari"	12	"L'amour Est Un Oiseau Rebelle"	14	"I Malamo"	Winner
Sakis Rouvas	Louis Panagiotou	7	"Wrecking Ball"	9	"All Of Me"	N/A (already eliminated)		Third place
Helena Paparizou	Alexis Prevenas	8	"Mono Gia Sena"	N/A (already eliminated)				Fourth place

== Ratings ==
Episode		Date	Timeslot (EET)	Ratings	Viewers (in millions)	Rank		Share		Source
Episode		Date	Timeslot (EET)	Ratings	Viewers (in millions)	Daily	Weekly	Household	Adults 18-54	Source
1	"Blind Auditions"	October 2, 2018	Tuesday 9:00pm	9.8%	1.016	#3	#9	24.6%	23.5%	
2	"Blind Auditions"	October 3, 2018	Wednesday 9:00pm	10.4%	1.080	#3	#6	25.6%	25.6%	
3	"Blind Auditions"	October 9, 2018	Tuesday 9:00pm	10.4%	1.077	#1	#7	25.0%	20.2%	
4	"Blind Auditions"	October 10, 2018	Wednesday 9:00pm	11.8%	1.224	#1	#1	28.9%	28.0%	
5	"Blind Auditions"	October 11, 2018	Thursday 8:45pm	10.0%	1.037	#2	#8	24.5%	22.8%	
6	"Blind Auditions"	October 16, 2018	Tuesday 9:00pm	10.1%	1.051	#1	#6	24.1%	22.1%	
7	"Blind Auditions"	October 17, 2018	Wednesday 9:00pm	12.1%	1.255	#1	#1	28.7%	24.8%	
8	"Blind Auditions"	October 18, 2018	Thursday 9:00pm	11.7%	1.217	#1	#2	28.2%	24.8%	
9	"Blind Auditions"	October 23, 2018	Tuesday 9:00pm	10.3%	1.066	#1	#6	25.0%	20.1%	
10	"Blind Auditions"	October 24, 2018	Wednesday 9:00pm	11.6%	1.208	#1	#1	28.6%	24.5%	
11	"Blind Auditions"	October 25, 2018	Thursday 9:00pm	11.2%	1.160	#1	#2	27.4%	23.6%	
12	"Blind Auditions"	October 30, 2018	Tuesday 9:00pm	11.3%	1.172	#1	#4	26.9%	23.0%	
13	"Blind Auditions"	October 31, 2018	Wednesday 9:00pm	13.0%	1.350	#1	#1	32.0%	30.8%	
14	"Blind Auditions"	November 1, 2018	Thursday 9:00pm	12.3%	1.277	#1	#3	30.7%	31.4%	
15	"Blind Auditions"	November 6, 2018	Tuesday 9:00pm	10.4%	1.077	#1	#6	25.0%	22.0%	
16	"Blind Auditions"	November 7, 2018	Wednesday 9:00pm	11.9%	1.241	#1	#1	30.0%	27.6%	
17	"Blind Auditions"	November 8, 2018	Thursday 9:00pm	10.9%	1.129	#1	#2	27.7%	26.6%	
18	"Battle Rounds"	November 13, 2018	Tuesday 9:00pm	10.9%	1.133	#1	#2	26.8%	24.1%	
19	"Battle Rounds"	November 14, 2018	Wednesday 9:00pm	12.8%	1.327	#1	#1	31.4%	29.5%	
20	"Battle Rounds"	November 15, 2018	Thursday 9:00pm	8.8%	0.914	#5	—N/a^{1}	21.8%	22.0%	
21	"Battle Rounds"	November 20, 2018	Tuesday 9:00pm	10.2%	1.055	#3	#8	23.9%	21.0%	
22	"Battle Rounds"	November 21, 2018	Wednesday 9:00pm	10.7%	1.108	#2	#4	25.9%	24.4%	
23	"Battle Rounds"	November 22, 2018	Thursday 9:00pm	8.6%	0.891	#4	#20	21.0%	19.1%	
24	"Knockouts"	November 27, 2018	Tuesday 8:45pm	8.8%	0.914	#4	#19	20.7%	16.3%	
25	"Knockouts"	November 28, 2018	Wednesday 9:00pm	10.4%	1.077	#2	#5	25.3%	22.7%	
26	"Knockouts"	November 29, 2018	Thursday 9:00pm	7.9%	0.819	#5	—N/a^{1}	20.2%	18.2%	
27	"Playoffs"	December 4, 2018	Tuesday 9:00pm	9.1%	0.942	#4	#16	21.2%	17.6%	
28	"Live Shows"	December 5, 2018	Wednesday 9:00pm	10.0%	1.034	#2	#8	25.9%	22.5%	
29	"Live Shows"	December 6, 2018	Thursday 9:00pm	8.8%	0.916	#4	#20	22.9%	19.6%	
30	"Live Semi-Final"	December 11, 2018	Tuesday 9:00pm	7.9%	0.823	#7	—N/a^{1}	18.9%	15.9%	
31	"Live Semi-Final"	December 12, 2018	Wednesday 9:00pm	9.0%	0.938	#3	#12	23.9%	20.3%	
32	"Live Final"	December 20, 2018	Thursday 9:00pm	9.5%	0.990	#3	#11	26.5%	21.9%	

Note

1. Outside top 20.
