= The Voice of Greece season 6 =

The Voice of Greece
- Season 6
- Hosted by: Giorgos Lianos; Christina Bompa
- Coaches: Helena Paparizou; Sakis Rouvas; Panos Mouzourakis; Eleonora Zouganeli
- Winner: Dimitris Karagiannis
- Winning coach: Sakis Rouvas
- Runner-up: Elpida Gad

Release
- Original network: Skai TV; Sigma TV
- Original release: September 27 – December 22, 2019

Season chronology
- ← Previous; Season 5 Next → Season 7

The sixth season of the talent show The Voice of Greece premiered on September 29, 2019, on Skai TV and Sigma TV.

The coaches were Helena Paparizou, Sakis Rouvas and Panos Mouzourakis returned for their fourth season as coaches, and with Eleonora Zouganeli as the new coach, replacing Kostis Maraveyas. Giorgos Lianos was the new host, replacing Giorgos Kapoutzidis. Christina Bompa was coming to serving as the new backstage and social networking corresponding, replacing Laura Narjes.

Dimitris Karagiannis was named the winner of the season on December 22, 2019; and Sakis Rouvas first win as a coach on The Voice of Greece.

== Coaches and hosts ==
On August 19, 2019, Giorgos Kapoutzidis announced on his Instagram that after 3 seasons he will not be hosting the show. On September 7, 2019, Kostis Maraveyas announced that he will not be anymore coach on The Voice of Greece. On September 23, 2019, Laura Narjes announced that after 2 seasons she will not be the Backstage host. Several celebrities were rumored to be part of The Voice of Greece as coaches or hosts. On September 19, 2019, was announced that the fourth coach will be the singer Eleonora Zouganeli, replacing Maraveyas. On September 21, 2019, was announced that Giorgos Lianos and Christina Bompa will be the hosts, replacing Kapoutzidis and Narjes.

== Teams ==
Color key

- Winner
- Runner-up
- Third place
- Fourth place
- Eliminated in Live Shows
- Stolen in the Battle rounds
- Eliminated in the Battle rounds
- Stolen in the Knockout rounds
- Eliminated in Knockout rounds
- Withdrew

Coaches	Top 144 artists				
Panos Mouzourakis					
Panos Mouzourakis	Kostas Cheilas	Konstantina Ifanti	Nasos Nikolaidis	Tamar Barsamian	Georgia Tzelati
Panos Mouzourakis	Angelina Statyeva	Georgia Daniilidou	Marialena Tzivanaki	Andromachi Koskeridou	~~Marina Dresiou~~
Panos Mouzourakis	Kleopatra Iakovou	Evaggelos Giannopoulos	Katerina Meliti	Tharrenos Peridis	Kallia Grinia
Panos Mouzourakis	Maria Athanasiadi	~~Sonia Iliadi~~	~~Maria Aisiopoulou~~	~~Andromachi Koskeridou~~	Vangelis Papatzanakis
Panos Mouzourakis	Eirini Christodoulou	Georgia Theodoulou	Giorgos Metaxas	Dimitris Kapnistos	Eva Vlachopoulou
Panos Mouzourakis	Evelyn Tsavalou	Eleftheria Anagnostou	Aggi	Nikos Chatzidimitriou	Ilias Apostolou
Panos Mouzourakis	Vera Zagali	Stavros Alexandros Papadakis	Aggeliki Tsichlogianni	Tonia Makedona	Rita Georga
Panos Mouzourakis	Solonas Ioannou	Arnel Lagen	Erofili Tzanou	Roxani Kontou	Anna Saini
Helena Paparizou					
Helena Paparizou	Elli Platanou	Konstantina Papastefanaki	Konstantinos Frantzis	Erika Soteri	Ioanna Theocharidou
Helena Paparizou	Makis Meras	Sarah Athina Haidar	Marina Dresiou	Apostolis Diamantopoulos	~~Anastasios Tsolakidis~~
Helena Paparizou	~~Georgia Daniilidou~~	Thanos Nikolopoulos	Melissa Kyriakou	Stefanos Christoforou	Alexandra Axioti
Helena Paparizou	Antonis Achtipis	Penny Papageorgiou	Giannis Tsarsitalidis	Evita Valeri	Konstantina Evaggelopoulou
Helena Paparizou	Vasilis Tsakiris	Christina Ioannou	Giannoula Strati	Nikos Pappas	Giorgos Gerogiannis
Helena Paparizou	Petros Sarakakis	Nikoleta Kitsiou	Aimilia Kanareli	Giannis Skamnakis	Stefanos Stergiou
Helena Paparizou	Chara Spyropoulou	Panagiota Theodoropoulou	Giorgos Giakoumakis	Danis Nikolaidis	Dimitris Smirniadis
Helena Paparizou	Ferruccelli	Anna Manolaraki	Eirini Adamopoulou	Anna Maria Vila	Andrea Savva
Sakis Rouvas					
Sakis Rouvas	Dimitris Karagiannis	Eirini Tsokounoglou	Konstantinos Tsimouris	Anna Capone Pappas	Dimitris Gerardos
Sakis Rouvas	Mirto Spyropoulou	Aristotelis Polonyfis	Marina Memousai	Sonia Iliadi	~~Sarah Athina Haidar~~
Sakis Rouvas	~~Christina Papadopoulou~~	Louise Du Toit	Giorgos Chouvardas	Manolis Vasilakis	Valia Dimou
Sakis Rouvas	Nicole Nikolaidou	~~Kleopatra Iakovou~~	~~Konstantinos Frantzis~~	Vasilis Chatzistefanou	Chris Hawks
Sakis Rouvas	Thanos Zambetakis	Vasilis Katsoulas	Dimitra Fragkou	Anastasia Kourkouta	Eirini Terzitanou
Sakis Rouvas	Valia Alexiou	Marios Sellas	Lena Rizopoulou	Christina Gerani	Maria Stefanou
Sakis Rouvas	Sona Arutyunyan	Eirini Agapitou	Natalia Petropoulou	Thanasis Koutsiaris	Nikos Vanesis
Sakis Rouvas	Stefanos Theodosiadis	Babis Panagiotopoulos	Elisavet Saramiyieva	Konstantina Katsoulakou	Dimitris Charisis
Eleonora Zouganeli					
Eleonora Zouganeli	Elpida Gad	Giorgos Efthimiadis	Christina Papadopoulou	Anastasios Tsolakidis	Konstantina Kordouli
Eleonora Zouganeli	Manolis Bribos	Manos Makropoulos	Thodoris Verlis	Konstantinos Mathioudakis	~~Anna Capone Pappas~~
Eleonora Zouganeli	~~Andromachi Koskeridou~~	~~Konstantinos Tsimouris~~	Maria Aisiopoulou	Lambis Giakoumakis	Anna Renieri
Eleonora Zouganeli	Argiro Igilizian	~~Thanos Nikolopoulos~~	~~Evaggelos Giannopoulos~~	~~Christina Papadopoulou~~	Stavros Tzinidis
Eleonora Zouganeli	Vaia Kampourani	Christina Pekri	Manos Bynichakis	Aristotelis Niras	Petros Zervas
Eleonora Zouganeli	Alexandros Kalantzis	Konstantinos Koritsas	Nikos Kostagios	Giorgos Stravoudakis	Giannis Karvelis
Eleonora Zouganeli	Eleni Panagopoulou	Despoina Albanidou	Malvina Germanou	Ioanna Tsanaka	Eirini Asimopoulou
Eleonora Zouganeli	Thodoris Mystiloglou	Kostis Kezemboglou	Stelios Chatziavramidis	Andromachi Dimopoulou	Stamatia Kleidomyti
Note: Italicized names are stolen artists (names struck through within former teams).

== Blind auditions ==
The episodes began airing on September 27, 2019, being broadcast every Friday and Sunday on Skai TV and Sigma TV.

Color key

✔	Coach hit his/her "ΣΕ ΘΕΛΩ (I want you)" button
	Artist defaulted to this coach's team
	Artist elected to join this coach's team
	Artist eliminated with no coach pressing his or her "ΣΕ ΘΕΛΩ (I want you)" button
✘	Coach pressed the "ΣΕ ΘΕΛΩ (I want you)" button, but was blocked by Panos from getting the artist
✘	Coach pressed the "ΣΕ ΘΕΛΩ (I want you)" button, but was blocked by Helena from getting the artist
✘	Coach pressed the "ΣΕ ΘΕΛΩ (I want you)" button, but was blocked by Sakis from getting the artist
✘	Coach pressed the "ΣΕ ΘΕΛΩ (I want you)" button, but was blocked by Eleonora from getting the artist

=== Episode 1 (September 27) ===
The first blind audition episode was broadcast on September 27, 2019.

Order	Artist	Age	Song	Coach's and contestant's choices			
Order	Artist	Age	Song	Panos	Helena	Sakis	Eleonora
1	Argiro Igilizian	31	"Rock and Roll"	✔	✔	✔	✔
2	Giannis Skamnakis	35	"Yellow"	✔	✔	–	–
3	Dimitris Chaniotis	43	"Matia Mou"	–	–	–	–
4	Mirto Spyropoulou	24	"Seven Nation Army"	–	✔	✔	✔
5	Christos Papadimou	45	"Mou' fages Ola ta Dahtilidia"	–	–	–	–
6	Eleftheria Anagnostou	18	"Otan Sou Chorevo"	✔	–	–	–
7	Louise Du Toit	53	"Nessun Dorma"	✔	✔	✔	✔
8	Elpida Gad	28	"Sodade"	✔	✔	✔	✔
9	Marios Darviras	31	"Logia Filika"	–	–	–	–
10	Eirini Christodoulou	18	"Ela"	✔	✔	–	–
11	Manolis Vasilakis	21	"Mia Hara na Pernas"	–	–	✔	–
12	Vera Zagali	19	"Still Got the Blues"	✔	✘	✔	✔
13	Vaggelis Vellos	40	"Valto Terma"	–	–	–	–
14	Penny Papageorgiou	25	"Venzinadiko"	–	✔	✔	✔

=== Episode 2 (September 29) ===
The second blind audition episode was broadcast on September 29, 2019.

Order	Artist	Age	Song	Coach's and contestant's choices			
Order	Artist	Age	Song	Panos	Helena	Sakis	Eleonora
1	Evelyn Tsavalou	22	"Afou To Thes"	✔	–	–	–
2	Stavros Tzinidis	28	"Katse Kala"	–	✔	✔	✔
3	Deppy Vasileiou	17	"We Don't Have to Take Our Clothes Off"	–	–	–	–
4	Eirini Tsokounoglou	30	"Den Thelo Na Ksereis"	✔	✔	✔	✔
5	Valentinos Charalambous	31	"I Zoi Allios"	–	–	–	–
6	Erofili Tzanou	32	"Apenanti"	✔	–	–	–
7	Chara Spyropoulou	17	"California Dreamin'"	✔	✔	–	–
8	Dimitris Charisis	43	"Vrechei Stin Ftochogeitonia"	–	✔	✔	✔
9	Rika Sachpelidou	23	"I Want to Break Free"	–	–	–	–
10	Giannis Karvelis	26	"Esy Ekei"	✔	✔	✔	✔
11	Michalis Nikolaou	25	"Happy End"	–	–	–	–
12	Stelios Chatziavramidis	36	"Skoni"	✔	✔	–	✔
13	Eleni Ierapetriti	16	"This Is the Life"	–	–	–	–
14	Stefanos Stergiou	32	"Highway to Hell"	✔	✔	–	✔
15	Evita Alymara	24	"Umbrella"	–	–	–	–
16	Arnel Lagen	22	"I Won't Give Up"	✔	–	✘	–
17	Sapfo Efstatiadi	24	"Because the Night"	–	–	–	–

=== Episode 3 (October 4) ===
The third blind audition episode was broadcast on October 4, 2019.

Order	Artist	Age	Song	Coach's and contestant's choices			
Order	Artist	Age	Song	Panos	Helena	Sakis	Eleonora
1	Sarah Athina Hydar	30	"Smells Like Teen Spirit"	–	–	✔	–
2	Stefanos Stefanopoulos	31	"Ena Mikrofono Ki Ego"	–	–	–	–
3	Georgia Daniilidou	18	"Riptide"	–	✔	–	✔
4	Elena Kofidou	17	"My Life Is Going On"	–	–	–	–
5	Marina Memousai	23	"Shallow"	✔	✔	✔	–
6	Konstantinos Tsimouris	37	"Girls Like You"	–	–	–	✔
7	Eleni Gourzi	33	"Kalytera"	–	–	–	–
8	Kostas Cheilas	32	"I Mpalanta Tou Kir Mentiou"	✔	–	✔	–
9	Konstantinos Frantzis	29	"Lonely Boy"	✔	✔	✔	✔
10	Danis Nikolaidis	37	"Kato Ap'to Poukamiso Mou"	–	✔	✔	✔
11	Tania	27	"Sweet but Psycho"	–	–	–	–
12	Tharrenos Peridis	24	"Zombie"	✔	–	–	–
13	Konstantina Kordouli	21	"O Pastor"	✔	✔	✔	✔
14	Nikolas Katsamakas	27	"Fairytale Gone Bad"	–	–	–	–
15	Andrea Savva	21	"Sway"	✔	✔	–	–

=== Episode 4 (October 6) ===
The fourth blind audition episode was broadcast on October 6, 2019.

Order	Artist	Age	Song	Coach's and contestant's choices			
Order	Artist	Age	Song	Panos	Helena	Sakis	Eleonora
1	Aggeliki Tsichlogianni	17	"Petao"	✔	✔	–	–
2	Manolis Psarras	28	"Opou Kai Na Pao"	–	–	–	–
3	Ioanna Theocharidou	19	"Señorita"	–	✔	–	–
4	Anastasia Kourkouta	22	"Give It to Me Right"	✔	✔	✔	–
5	Ifigeneia Christodoulou	23	"Alla Mou Len' Ta Matia Sou"	–	–	–	–
6	Maria Athanasiadi	29	"What About Us"	✔	–	✔	–
7	Dimitris Smirniadis	34	"Mazi Sou"	–	✔	–	–
8	Rozana Tseliou	37	"Chamena"	–	–	–	–
9	Anna Capone Pappas	31	"Padam Padam"	✔	✔	✔	✔
10	Nikos Pappas	19	"I Don't Care"	✔	✔	–	–
11	Sonia Iliadi	16	"Summertime"	✔	✔	✔	✔
12	Panos Vavilis	32	"Gela Mou"	–	–	–	–
13	Georgia Tzelati	26	"You Can Leave Your Hat On"	✔	✔	✔	✔
14	Eirini Asimopoulou	25	"Moiroloi (Ilie Fonia)"	✔	✔	✔	✔
15	Olivia Kampf	19	"Baby One More Time"	–	–	–	–
16	Chris Hawks	26	"Old Town Road"	–	–	✔	✔

=== Episode 5 (October 11) ===
The fifth blind audition episode was broadcast on October 11, 2019.

Order	Artist	Age	Song	Coach's and contestant's choices			
Order	Artist	Age	Song	Panos	Helena	Sakis	Eleonora
1	Panagiota Theodoropoulou	20	"Me Ta Matia Kleista"	–	✔	–	–
2	Paris Konstantaras	28	"Mesa Se Mia Nichta"	–	–	–	–
3	Eirini Agapitou	22	"Tosa Kalokairia"	✔	✔	✔	–
4	Giorgos Mpatzakis	22	"Behind Blue Eyes"	–	–	–	–
5	Erika Soteri	20	"Crazy"	✘	✔	✔	✔
6	Elli Eirini Koukiou	20	"Believer"	–	–	–	–
7	Aristotelis Niras	28	"Stis Pikrodafnis Ton Antho"	–	✔	✔	✔
8	Maria Vacher	17	"Fall in Line"	–	–	–	–
9	Kleopatra Iakovou	20	"River"	–	–	✔	–
10	Anastasios Tsolakidis	19	"Never Really Over"	✔	✔	✔	✔
11	Dimitris Karokis	23	"Poula Me"	–	–	–	–
12	Konstantina Ifanti	19	"Move Over"	✔	✔	✔	✔
13	Alexandros Kalantzis	21	"O Mpampis o Flou"	–	–	–	✔
14	Stavros Alexandros Papadakis	21	"Duele el Corazón"	✔	–	–	–
15	Despoina Albanidou	25	"Si Mou Charakses Poreia"	–	✔	✔	✔
16	Vasilis Katsoulas	23	"Say Something"	–	–	✔	✔

=== Episode 6 (October 13) ===
The sixth blind audition episode was broadcast on October 13, 2019.

Order	Artist	Age	Song	Coach's and contestant's choices			
Order	Artist	Age	Song	Panos	Helena	Sakis	Eleonora
1	Rita Georga	17	"Bird Set Free"	✔	–	–	–
2	Margarita Soileme	23	"What a Feeling"	–	–	–	–
3	Dimitris Gerardos	25	"I'm Not the Only One"	✔	✔	✔	✔
4	Zoi Liandraki	36	"Piga se Magisses"	–	–	–	–
5	Kostis Kezemboglou	31	"Blowin' in the Wind"	–	✔	–	✔
6	Ferruccelli	40	"As Pan stin Efchi ta Palia"	✔	✔	✔	–
7	Christina Pekri	29	"Just like a Pill"	–	–	✔	✔
8	Giorgos Metaxas	42	"Emena Mono"	✔	–	–	–
9	Elli Platanou	37	"Baby I Love You"	✔	✔	✔	✔
10	Giorgos Chouvardas	19	"Den Echo Pou na Pao"	–	✔	✔	✔
11	Zafeiris Paraskevopoulos	35	"Pou na Vro Gynaika na sou Moiazei"	–	–	–	–
12	Andromachi Koskeridou	19	"Dangerous Woman"	✔	✔	✔	✔
13	Tasos Chrisopoulos	33	"Sti Skepsi tis Trelis"	–	–	–	–
14	Nicole Nikolaidou	34	"You Oughta Know"	✔	–	✔	–

=== Episode 7 (October 18) ===
The seventh blind audition episode was broadcast on October 18, 2019.

Order	Artist	Age	Song	Coach's and contestant's choices			
Order	Artist	Age	Song	Panos	Helena	Sakis	Eleonora
1	Kallia Grinia	26	"Einai Entaksei Mazi Mou"	✔	–	–	–
2	Natalia Petropoulou	39	"Novembre"	–	✔	✔	✔
3	Xenia Adamou	26	"Call Me"	–	–	–	–
4	Apostolis Diamantopoulos	26	"My Melancholy Blues"	✔	✔	✔	✔
5	Georgina Antoniou	32	"Ochi Den Tha Mporeso"	–	–	–	–
6	Konstantinos Mathioudakis	27	"Pou Sai Thanasi"	–	–	–	✔
7	Melissa Kyriakou	23	"Clown"	✔	✔	✔	✔
8	Konstantinos Kefalas	36	"Methyse Apopse to Koritsi Mou"	–	–	–	–
9	Thodoris Verlis	34	"Sar Penen"	✔	✔	–	✔
10	Stella Petouri	40	"Ton Idio to Theo"	–	–	–	–
11	Giorgos Giakoumakis	34	"Na Pas"	–	✔	✔	–
12	Solonas Ioannou	25	"Radioactive"	✔	✔	✔	–
13	Dimitra Georgiou	18	"Genie in a Bottle"	–	–	–	–
14	Valia Dimou	25	"Breath"	✔	✔	✔	✔
15	Irodotos	28	"Mono Mia Fora"	–	–	–	–
16	Maria Aisiopoulou	17	"Sober"	✔	–	✔	–

=== Episode 8 (October 20) ===
The eighth blind audition episode was broadcast on October 20, 2019.

Order	Artist	Age	Song	Coach's and contestant's choices			
Order	Artist	Age	Song	Panos	Helena	Sakis	Eleonora
1	Alexandra Axioti	19	"Big Spender"	–	✔	✔	✔
2	Maria Karadimitri	21	"San Magemeno to Myalo Mou"	–	–	–	–
3	Vasilis Chatzistefanou	27	"Basket Case"	–	–	✔	–
4	Manolis Bribos	40	"Ring of Fire"	–	✔	–	✔
5	Marialena Tzivanaki	19	"Mad World"	✔	✔	✔	✔
6	Marina Sofia Papantonaki	27	"Higher Ground"	–	–	–	–
7	Giannoula Strati	22	"Without Me"	–	✔	✔	✔
8	Marina Dresiou	26	"Still Loving You"	✔	✔	✔	✔
9	Stefani Chatzisavva	28	"Valerie"	–	–	–	–
10	Georgia Theodoulou	18	"Agapise Me"	✔	–	–	–
11	Stefanos Christoforou	25	"Cry Me a River"	–	✔	✔	✔
12	Panos Chatzis	26	"Rotisa ta Matia Mou"	–	–	–	–
13	Aggi	27	"You Got the Love"	✔	✔	–	–
14	Alexandros Sidiropoulos	23	"Gia Paradeigma"	–	–	–	–

=== Episode 9 (October 25) ===
The ninth blind audition episode was broadcast on October 25, 2019.

Order	Artist	Age	Song	Coach's and contestant's choices			
Order	Artist	Age	Song	Panos	Helena	Sakis	Eleonora
1	Roxani Kontou	50	"Mi Me Sigkrineis"	✔	–	–	–
2	Alexandra Chatzikyriakou	18	"I Gkarsona"	–	–	–	–
3	Makis Meras	21	"To Mantili"	✔	✔	✔	–
4	Athina Kastrinaki	34	"The Power of Love"	–	–	–	–
5	Vangelis Papatzanakis	39	"Come What May"	✔	✔	✔	✔
6	Eirini Kakagianni	23	"Say My Name"	–	–		–
7	Konstantina Evaggelopoulou	17	"All I Ask"	✔	✔	✔	–
8	Katerina Meliti	30	"Ela"	✔	✔	✔	✔
9	Nikos Sapountzakis	31	"Na Pio Nero Apo ta Cheili Sou"	–	–	–	–
10	Giorgos Stravoudakis	46	"Mi Mou Thimoneis Matia Mou"	–	✔	✔	✔
11	Eirini Terzitanou	18	"Ave Maria"	–	✔	✔	✔
12	Spiros Magalios	29	"Se Agapisa ston Megisto Vathmo"	–	–	–	–
13	Anna Maria Vila	29	"An Me Deis na Klaio"	–	✔	✔	–
14	Nikos Chatzidimitriou	29	"Pes Kati"	✔	–	–	–
15	Manos Bynichakis	21	"Ta Paidia tis Geitonias Sou"	–	–	✔	✔

=== Episode 10 (October 27) ===
The tenth blind audition episode was broadcast on October 27, 2019.

Order	Artist	Age	Song	Coach's and contestant's choices			
Order	Artist	Age	Song	Panos	Helena	Sakis	Eleonora
1	Tonia Makedona	17	"Always Remember Us This Way"	✔	–	✔	–
2	Antonis Achtipis	35	"Mia Nihta Zoriki"	–	✔	✔	–
3	Theonimphi Christaki	21	"Apopse Thelo Na Pio"	–	–	–	–
4	Nasos Nikolaidis	48	"Stin Kardia"	✔	✔	✔	✔
5	Evgenia Tsirtsi	30	"To Teleftaio Potiraki"	–	–	–	–
6	Tamar Barsamian	23	"Eksotiko Charmani"	✔	–	–	–
7	Giannis Tsarsitalidis	32	"Hijo de la Luna"	–	✔	✔	–
8	Angelina Statyeva	30	"Lule Lule"	✔	✔	✔	✔
9	Lambis Giakoumakis	21	"Anoites Agapes"	–	–	–	✔
10	Vasilis Tsakiris	39	"Sinora i Agapi Den Gnorizei"	–	✔	–	–
11	Konstantina Katsoulakou	24	"Hopelessly Devoted to You"	–	✔	✔	–
12	Giorgos Efthimiadis	31	"John the Revelator"	–	✘	✔	✔
13	Maria Papadopoulou	22	"Oi Filoi Mou Charamata"	–	–	–	–
14	Konstantinos Koritsas	30	"San Anemos"	–	✔	✔	✔

=== Episode 11 (November 1) ===
The eleventh blind audition episode was broadcast on November 1, 2019.

Order	Artist	Age	Song	Coach's and contestant's choices			
Order	Artist	Age	Song	Panos	Helena	Sakis	Eleonora
1	Stefanos Theodosiadis	40	"Anestaki"	–	✔	✔	–
2	Aimilia Kanareli	19	"Guitar"	–	✔	–	–
3	Marios Sellas	23	"Warrior"	–	✘	✔	✔
4	Katie Midas	19	"7 Years"	–	–	–	–
5	Petros Zervas	24	"Hamlet Tis Selinis"	✔	–	✔	✔
6	Nikoleta Kitsiou	24	"Metrisa"	–	✔	✔	✔
7	Thanos Zambetakis	26	"Hoochie Coochie Man"	–	✔	✔	✔
8	Eleni Panagopoulou	26	"No Roots"	✔	✔	✔	✔
9	Ilias Apostolou	34	"Mechri Aima na Vgei"	✔	✔	✔	✘
10	Evaggelos Giannopoulos	34	"She Will Be Loved"	–	–	–	✔
11	Katerina Mavropoulou	17	"Flashlight"	–	–	–	–
12	Valia Alexiou	32	"Mono Esy (Après toi)"	–	–	✔	–
13	Panagiotis Chatzigeorgiou	28	"S'Agapo san Amartia"	–	–	–	–
14	Ioanna Tsanaka	38	"My Favorite Things"	–	–	✔	✔

=== Episode 12 (November 3) ===
The twelfth blind audition episode was broadcast on November 3, 2019.

Order	Artist	Age	Song	Coach's and contestant's choices			
Order	Artist	Age	Song	Panos	Helena	Sakis	Eleonora
1	Stamatia Kleidomyti	18	"Sweet Understanding Love"	–	–	–	✔
2	Maria Stefanou	25	"Promises"	✔	–	✔	–
3	Giorgos Gerogiannis	36	"Astra Mi Me Malonete"	–	✔	–	–
4	Minas Kamaratos	33	"Anapantita"	–	–	–	–
5	Anna Renieri	30	"Call Out My Name"	✔	✔	✔	✔
6	Dimitris Karagiannis	42	"Georgia on My Mind"	–	✔	✔	✔
7	Giannis Tsotras	35	"Me Pnigei Touti i Siopi"	–	–	–	–
8	Eirini Adamopoulou	22	"Breathin"	–	✔	✔	✔
9	Thanos Nikolopoulos	32	"Gethsemane (I Only Want to Say)"	✘	✔	✔	✔
10	Aristotelis Polonyfis	19	"Den Eho Idea"	–	✔	✔	–
11	Theodoti Alexandrou	29	"Fever"	–	–	–	–
12	Nikos Kostagios	20	"Ethniki Odos"	–	–	✔	✔
13	Konstantina Papastefanaki	21	"Makria Mou na Figeis"	✔	✔	✔	✔
14	Nikos Vanesis	39	"Tha Ekrago"	–	–	✔	–

=== Episode 13 (November 8) ===
The thirteenth blind audition episode was broadcast on November 8, 2019.

Order	Artist	Age	Song	Coach's and contestant's choices			
Order	Artist	Age	Song	Panos	Helena	Sakis	Eleonora
1	Thodoris Mystiloglou	24	"Itan Pente Itan Eksi"	–	✔	–	✔
2	Evelina Anastasiou	22	"Love Me Again"	–	–	–	–
3	Babis Panagiotopoulos	33	"Ki Emeina Edo"	–	–	✔	–
4	Evita Valeri	28	"Adonis"	–	✔	✔	–
5	Natasa Andreou	23	"I'd Rather Go Blind"	–	–	–	–
6	Sofia Papapolyzou	20	"On Ira"	–	–	–	–
7	Anna Saini	27	"Libiamo ne' lieti calici"	✔	✔	–	–
8	Manos Makropoulos	34	"Ta Savvata"	–	–	–	✔
9	Christina Gerani	37	"Mia Pista Apo Phosphoro"	✔	✔	✔	–
10	Petros Sarakakis	30	"Patrida Araevo Se"	–	✔	–	–
11	Marialena Votsi	18	"Paparazzi"	–	–	–	–
12	Christina Papadopoulou	34	"Tha Spaso Koupes"	–	–	✔	✔
13	Giorgos Kalogeropoulos	31	"Tou Ai Giorgi (Ederlezi)"	–	–	–	–
14	Lena Rizopoulou	20	"O Proskinitis"	–	–	✔	–
15	Eleni Menelaou	20	"Ta Apogevmata ta Adeia"	–	–	–	–
16	Elisavet Saramiyieva	18	"Rehab"	✔	–	✔	✔

=== Episode 14 (November 10) ===
The fourteenth and final blind audition episode was broadcast on November 10, 2019.

Order	Artist	Age	Song	Coach's and contestant's choices			
Order	Artist	Age	Song	Panos	Helena	Sakis	Eleonora
1	Dimitra Fragkou	28	"Is This Love"	–	–	✔	–
2	Vaia Kampourani	19	"I Tampakiera"	–	–	✔	✔
3	Dimitris Koukoutsis	21	"Otan Charazei sto Aigaio"	–	–	–	–
4	Eva Vlachopoulou	31	"Charlie Chaplin"	✔	–	–	–
5	Anna Manolaraki	39	"With or Without You"	✔	✔	✔	✔
6	Nikos Delidis	45	"Ennea Ogdoa"	–	–	–	–
7	Sona Arutyunyan	31	"Killing Me Softly with His Song"	✔	–	✔	–
8	Marios Dritsas	18	"Vrechei Stin Ftochogeitonia"	–	–	–	–
9	Dimitris Kapnistos	27	"Sou Milo kai Kokkinizeis"	✔	–	–	–
10	Lizzie	20	"IDGAF"	Team full	–	–	–
11	Malvina Germanou	25	"I Will Survive"	Team full	✔	✔	✔
12	Andreas Manthopoulos	32	"Platanos"	Team full	–	–	–
13	Thanasis Koutsiaris	37	"Phisikse o Vardaris"	Team full	–	✔	–
14	Markella Koukouli	37	"I Put a Spell on You"	Team full	–	Team full	–
15	Andromachi Dimopoulou	24	"Parea"	Team full	–	Team full	✔
16	Panagiotis Gavrilopoulos	37	"Ti Zitas"	Team full	–	Team full	Team full
17	Christina Ioannou	44	"Ta Deilina"	Team full	✔	Team full	Team full

== Knockouts ==
The Knockouts started on November 15, 2019. The coaches can each steal two losing artists from another team. Contestants who win their knockout or are stolen by another coach will advance to the Battles.

Colour key

✔	Coach hit his/her "I WANT YOU" button
	Artist won the Knockout and advanced to the Battles
	Artist lost the Knockout but was stolen by another coach and advances to the Battles
	Artist lost the Knockout and was eliminated

Episode	Coach	Order	Winner		Losers		'Steal' result			
Episode	Coach	Order	Artist	Song	Artists	Song	Panos	Elena	Sakis	Eleonora
Episode 15 (November 15, 2019)	Eleonora Zouganeli	1	Anna Capone Pappas	"San ton Metanasti (Kardesin Duymaz)"	Stamatia Kleidomyti	"When We Were Young"	–	–	–	—N/a
Episode 15 (November 15, 2019)	Eleonora Zouganeli	1	Anna Capone Pappas	"San ton Metanasti (Kardesin Duymaz)"	Andromachi Dimopoulou	"Agapa Me"	–	–	–	—N/a
Episode 15 (November 15, 2019)	Sakis Rouvas	2	Giorgos Chouvardas	"Thes"	Konstantinos Frantzis	"Pou Na Eksigo"	–	✔	—N/a	–
Episode 15 (November 15, 2019)	Sakis Rouvas	2	Giorgos Chouvardas	"Thes"	Dimitris Charisis	"Paraponemena Logia"	–	–	—N/a	–
Episode 15 (November 15, 2019)	Helena Paparizou	3	Erika Soteri	"Stronger Than Me"	Andrea Savva	"This Mountain"	–	—N/a	–	–
Episode 15 (November 15, 2019)	Helena Paparizou	3	Erika Soteri	"Stronger Than Me"	Anna Maria Vila	"Don't Be So Shy"	–	—N/a	–	–
Episode 15 (November 15, 2019)	Panos Mouzourakis	4	Nasos Nikolaidis	"Simera"	Roxani Kontou	"Afti I Nihta Menei"	—N/a	–	–	–
Episode 15 (November 15, 2019)	Panos Mouzourakis	4	Nasos Nikolaidis	"Simera"	Erofili Tzanou	"Treno"	—N/a	–	–	–
Episode 15 (November 15, 2019)	Eleonora Zouganeli	5	Lambis Giakoumakis	"De Milame"	Stelios Chatziavramidis	"Den Eicha Dinami"	–	–	–	—N/a
Episode 15 (November 15, 2019)	Eleonora Zouganeli	5	Lambis Giakoumakis	"De Milame"	Christina Papadopoulou	"Last Kiss"	–	–	✔	—N/a
Episode 15 (November 15, 2019)	Sakis Rouvas	6	Marina Memousai	"Love on the Brain"	Konstantina Katsoulakou	"The Show Must Go On"	–	–	—N/a	–
Episode 15 (November 15, 2019)	Sakis Rouvas	6	Marina Memousai	"Love on the Brain"	Elisavet Saramiyieva	"Sign of the Times"	–	–	—N/a	–
Episode 15 (November 15, 2019)	Panos Mouzourakis	7	Tharrenos Peridis	"Rock n' Roll sto Krevati"	Arnel Lagen	"Gia To Kalo Mou"	—N/a	–	–	–
Episode 15 (November 15, 2019)	Panos Mouzourakis	7	Tharrenos Peridis	"Rock n' Roll sto Krevati"	Solonas Ioannou	"Turn the Page"	—N/a	–	–	–
Episode 15 (November 15, 2019)	Helena Paparizou	8	Stefanos Christoforou	"River"	Eirini Adamopoulou	"Qué Hiciste"	–	—N/a	–	–
Episode 15 (November 15, 2019)	Helena Paparizou	8	Stefanos Christoforou	"River"	Anna Manolaraki	"Frozen"	–	—N/a	–	–
Episode 15 (November 15, 2019)	Sakis Rouvas	9	Manolis Vasilakis	"Triantafylleni"	Babis Panagiotopoulos	"Pano Ap'ta Sinnefa"	–	–	—N/a	–
Episode 15 (November 15, 2019)	Sakis Rouvas	9	Manolis Vasilakis	"Triantafylleni"	Stefanos Theodosiadis	"Ta Filia sou Einai Fotia"	–	–	—N/a	–
Episode 15 (November 15, 2019)	Panos Mouzourakis	10	Kallia Grinia	"Kapoios Na Me Syrei"	Rita Georga	"To Cheirokrotima"	—N/a	–	–	–
Episode 15 (November 15, 2019)	Panos Mouzourakis	10	Kallia Grinia	"Kapoios Na Me Syrei"	Tonia Makedona	"Vlepo Fos"	—N/a	–	–	–
Episode 15 (November 15, 2019)	Helena Paparizou	11	Apostolis Diamantopoulos	"The Handler"	Ferruccelli	"Taksidi"	–	—N/a	–	–
Episode 15 (November 15, 2019)	Helena Paparizou	11	Apostolis Diamantopoulos	"The Handler"	Dimitris Smirniadis	"Poios Theos"	–	—N/a	–	–
Episode 15 (November 15, 2019)	Eleonora Zouganeli	12	Elpida Gad	"Apochairetismos (Thalassa)"	Kostis Kezemboglou	"Wicked Game"	–	–	–	—N/a
Episode 15 (November 15, 2019)	Eleonora Zouganeli	12	Elpida Gad	"Apochairetismos (Thalassa)"	Thodoris Mystiloglou	"Episimi Agapimeni"	–	–	–	—N/a
Episode 16 (November 17, 2019)	Sakis Rouvas	1	Aristotelis Polonyfis	"Ela kai Ragise ton Kosmo Mou"	Nikos Vanesis	"Den Ksero Giati"	–	–	—N/a	–
Episode 16 (November 17, 2019)	Sakis Rouvas	1	Aristotelis Polonyfis	"Ela kai Ragise ton Kosmo Mou"	Thanasis Koutsiaris	"Se Thelo"	–	–	—N/a	–
Episode 16 (November 17, 2019)	Eleonora Zouganeli	2	Manos Makropoulos	"Kai Den Mporo"	Eirini Asimopoulou	"Mparmpagiannakakis"	–	–	–	—N/a
Episode 16 (November 17, 2019)	Eleonora Zouganeli	2	Manos Makropoulos	"Kai Den Mporo"	Ioanna Tsanaka	"Non Ti Scordar Mai Di Me (song)"	–	–	–	—N/a
Episode 16 (November 17, 2019)	Panos Mouzourakis	3	Konstantina Ifanti	"To S'agapo Mporei"	Andromachi Koskeridou	"Addicted to You"	—N/a	–	–	✔
Episode 16 (November 17, 2019)	Panos Mouzourakis	3	Konstantina Ifanti	"To S'agapo Mporei"	Aggeliki Tsichlogianni	"Je Veux"	—N/a	–	–	–
Episode 16 (November 17, 2019)	Helena Paparizou	4	Antonis Achtipis	"Tis Eipa Mia Nihta Na Meinei"	Danis Nikolaidis	"Poses Fores"	–	—N/a	–	–
Episode 16 (November 17, 2019)	Helena Paparizou	4	Antonis Achtipis	"Tis Eipa Mia Nihta Na Meinei"	Giorgos Giakoumakis	"Itane Lathos Mou"	–	—N/a	–	–
Episode 16 (November 17, 2019)	Panos Mouzourakis	5	Georgia Tzelati	"Kiss"	Stavros Alexandros Papadakis	"Bailando"	—N/a	–	–	–
Episode 16 (November 17, 2019)	Panos Mouzourakis	5	Georgia Tzelati	"Kiss"	Vera Zagali	"Cryin'"	—N/a	–	–	–
Episode 16 (November 17, 2019)	Eleonora Zouganeli	6	Giorgos Efthimiadis	"You Are My Sunshine"	Evaggelos Giannopoulos	"Muscle Museum"	✔	–	–	—N/a
Episode 16 (November 17, 2019)	Eleonora Zouganeli	6	Giorgos Efthimiadis	"You Are My Sunshine"	Thanos Nikolopoulos	"Come Together"	–	✔	✔	—N/a
Episode 16 (November 17, 2019)	Helena Paparizou	7	Melissa Kyriakou	"Because of You"	Panagiota Theodoropoulou	"Me to Idio Mako"	–	Team full	–	–
Episode 16 (November 17, 2019)	Helena Paparizou	7	Melissa Kyriakou	"Because of You"	Chara Spyropoulou	"Ego Gia Sena"	–	Team full	–	–
Episode 16 (November 17, 2019)	Sakis Rouvas	8	Eirini Tsokounoglou	"The Greatest Love of All"	Natalia Petropoulou	"Caruso"	–	Team full	—N/a	–
Episode 16 (November 17, 2019)	Sakis Rouvas	8	Eirini Tsokounoglou	"The Greatest Love of All"	Kleopatra Iakovou	"Make It Rain"	✔	Team full	—N/a	–
Episode 16 (November 17, 2019)	Eleonora Zouganeli	9	Manolis Bribos	"O Achilleas ap'to Cairo"	Malvina Germanou	"Human"	Team full	Team full	–	—N/a
Episode 16 (November 17, 2019)	Eleonora Zouganeli	9	Manolis Bribos	"O Achilleas ap'to Cairo"	Despoina Albanidou	"Tora ki Ego tha Ziso"	Team full	Team full	–	—N/a
Episode 16 (November 17, 2019)	Panos Mouzourakis	10	Tamar Barsamian	"Taksidi stin Vrochi"	Ilias Apostolou	"Mia Sinousia Mistiki"	Team full	Team full	–	–
Episode 16 (November 17, 2019)	Panos Mouzourakis	10	Tamar Barsamian	"Taksidi stin Vrochi"	Nikos Chatzidimitriou	"Ti na Thimitho"	Team full	Team full	–	–
Episode 16 (November 17, 2019)	Helena Paparizou	11	Georgia Daniilidou	"Dancing On My Own"	Stefanos Stergiou	"Another Love"	Team full	Team full	–	–
Episode 16 (November 17, 2019)	Helena Paparizou	11	Georgia Daniilidou	"Dancing On My Own"	Giannis Skamnakis	"Ap'to Aeroplano"	Team full	Team full	–	–
Episode 16 (November 17, 2019)	Sakis Rouvas	12	Louise Du Toit	"Just Walk Away"	Eirini Agapitou	"All Alone Am I / Min ton Rotas ton Ourano"	Team full	Team full	—N/a	–
Episode 16 (November 17, 2019)	Sakis Rouvas	12	Louise Du Toit	"Just Walk Away"	Sona Arutyunyan	"Rise Like a Phoenix"	Team full	Team full	—N/a	–
Episode 17 (November 22, 2019)	Helena Paparizou	1	Anastasios Tsolakidis	"You Are the Only One"	Aimilia Kanareli	"Mikro Mou Pony"	Team full	Team full	–	–
Episode 17 (November 22, 2019)	Helena Paparizou	1	Anastasios Tsolakidis	"You Are the Only One"	Nikoleta Kitsiou	"Piase Me"	Team full	Team full	–	–
Episode 17 (November 22, 2019)	Eleonora Zouganeli	2	Konstantinos Tsimouris	"En Lefko"	Eleni Panagopoulou	"Man Down"	Team full	Team full	–	—N/a
Episode 17 (November 22, 2019)	Eleonora Zouganeli	2	Konstantinos Tsimouris	"En Lefko"	Giannis Karvelis	"Kalo Taksidi"	Team full	Team full	–	—N/a
Episode 17 (November 22, 2019)	Sakis Rouvas	3	Valia Dimou	"Fallin'"	Maria Stefanou	"What's Up?"	Team full	Team full	—N/a	–
Episode 17 (November 22, 2019)	Sakis Rouvas	3	Valia Dimou	"Fallin'"	Christina Gerani	"Fevgo"	Team full	Team full	—N/a	–
Episode 17 (November 22, 2019)	Panos Mouzourakis	4	Angelina Statyeva	"Don't Cry for Louie"	Aggi	"Blue Jeans"	Team full	Team full	–	–
Episode 17 (November 22, 2019)	Panos Mouzourakis	4	Angelina Statyeva	"Don't Cry for Louie"	Eleftheria Anagnostou	"Tha'mai Konta sou Otan Me Thes"	Team full	Team full	–	–
Episode 17 (November 22, 2019)	Eleonora Zouganeli	5	Konstantina Kordouli	"Prosopa"	Giorgos Stravoudakis	"Ilie Mou se Parakalo"	Team full	Team full	–	—N/a
Episode 17 (November 22, 2019)	Eleonora Zouganeli	5	Konstantina Kordouli	"Prosopa"	Nikos Kostagios	"Oli i Zoi Mou"	Team full	Team full	–	—N/a
Episode 17 (November 22, 2019)	Helena Paparizou	6	Konstantina Papastefanaki	"Ola se Thimizoun"	Petros Sarakakis	"Ada Son Kosmon Araevo"	Team full	Team full	–	–
Episode 17 (November 22, 2019)	Helena Paparizou	6	Konstantina Papastefanaki	"Ola se Thimizoun"	Giorgos Gerogiannis	"Fthinoporo"	Team full	Team full	–	–
Episode 17 (November 22, 2019)	Panos Mouzourakis	7	Katerina Meliti	"Ti Einai Afto Pou to Lene Agapi"	Evelyn Tsavalou	"Mia Kyriaki Apogevma"	Team full	Team full	–	–
Episode 17 (November 22, 2019)	Panos Mouzourakis	7	Katerina Meliti	"Ti Einai Afto Pou to Lene Agapi"	Eva Vlachopoulou	"Madame Sousou"	Team full	Team full	–	–
Episode 17 (November 22, 2019)	Sakis Rouvas	8	Nicole Nikolaidou	"Stereotypa"	Lena Rizopoulou	"Ena Sfalma Ekana"	Team full	Team full	—N/a	–
Episode 17 (November 22, 2019)	Sakis Rouvas	8	Nicole Nikolaidou	"Stereotypa"	Marios Sellas	"The Edge of Glory"	Team full	Team full	—N/a	–
Episode 17 (November 22, 2019)	Helena Paparizou	9	Ioanna Theocharidou	"Runnin' (Lose It All)"	Nikos Pappas	"Starboy"	Team full	Team full	–	–
Episode 17 (November 22, 2019)	Helena Paparizou	9	Ioanna Theocharidou	"Runnin' (Lose It All)"	Giannoula Strati	"Ola Afta Pou Fovamai"	Team full	Team full	–	–
Episode 17 (November 22, 2019)	Eleonora Zouganeli	10	Thodoris Verlis	"Se girevo"	Konstantinos Koritsas	"Erotas Kleftis"	Team full	Team full	–	—N/a
Episode 17 (November 22, 2019)	Eleonora Zouganeli	10	Thodoris Verlis	"Se girevo"	Alexandros Kalantzis	"Disco Girl"	Team full	Team full	–	—N/a
Episode 17 (November 22, 2019)	Sakis Rouvas	11	Mirto Spyropoulou	"Me Voy"	Valia Alexiou	"Den Eimai Ego"	Team full	Team full	—N/a	–
Episode 17 (November 22, 2019)	Sakis Rouvas	11	Mirto Spyropoulou	"Me Voy"	Eirini Terzitanou	"O Mio Babbino Caro"	Team full	Team full	—N/a	–
Episode 17 (November 22, 2019)	Panos Mouzourakis	12	Kostas Cheilas	"I Tigris"	Dimitris Kapnistos	"I Nihta Mirizei Giasemi"	Team full	Team full	–	–
Episode 17 (November 22, 2019)	Panos Mouzourakis	12	Kostas Cheilas	"I Tigris"	Giorgos Metaxas	"Oi 7 Nanoi sto S/S Cyrenia"	Team full	Team full	–	–
Episode 18 (November 24, 2019)	Eleonora Zouganeli	1	Konstantinos Mathioudakis	"Mou'heis Kanei tin Zoi mou Kolasi"	Petros Zervas	"Den Mporo"	Team full	Team full	–	—N/a
Episode 18 (November 24, 2019)	Eleonora Zouganeli	1	Konstantinos Mathioudakis	"Mou'heis Kanei tin Zoi mou Kolasi"	Aristotelis Niras	"Perase Ena Kalokairi"	Team full	Team full	–	—N/a
Episode 18 (November 24, 2019)	Sakis Rouvas	2	Sarah Athina Hydar	"I Never Loved a Man (The Way I Love You)"	Anastasia Kourkouta	"I Have Nothing"	Team full	Team full	—N/a	–
Episode 18 (November 24, 2019)	Sakis Rouvas	2	Sarah Athina Hydar	"I Never Loved a Man (The Way I Love You)"	Dimitra Fragkou	"Nihta Stasou"	Team full	Team full	—N/a	–
Episode 18 (November 24, 2019)	Panos Mouzourakis	3	Maria Athanasiadi	"Empire State of Mind"	Georgia Theodoulou	"Koita Ego"	Team full	Team full	–	–
Episode 18 (November 24, 2019)	Panos Mouzourakis	3	Maria Athanasiadi	"Empire State of Mind"	Eirini Christodoulou	"Crazy in Love"	Team full	Team full	–	–
Episode 18 (November 24, 2019)	Helena Paparizou	4	Makis Meras	"Tora ti na to Kano"	Christina Ioannou	"Ksenihtisa stin Porta sou"	Team full	Team full	–	–
Episode 18 (November 24, 2019)	Helena Paparizou	4	Makis Meras	"Tora ti na to Kano"	Vasilis Tsakiris	"Lege me Paliopaido"	Team full	Team full	–	–
Episode 18 (November 24, 2019)	Eleonora Zouganeli	5	Anna Renieri	"Misise me"	Manos Bynichakis	"Diamonds"	Team full	Team full	–	—N/a
Episode 18 (November 24, 2019)	Eleonora Zouganeli	5	Anna Renieri	"Misise me"	Christina Pekri	"An Einai i Agapi Amartia"	Team full	Team full	–	—N/a
Episode 18 (November 24, 2019)	Panos Mouzourakis	6	Marina Dresiou	"Uninvited"	Sonia Iliadi	"It Don't Mean a Thing (If It Ain't Got That Swing)"	Team full	Team full	✔	–
Episode 18 (November 24, 2019)	Panos Mouzourakis	6	Marina Dresiou	"Uninvited"	Maria Aisiopoulou	"Idontwannabeyouanymore"	Team full	Team full	Team full	✔
Episode 18 (November 24, 2019)	Sakis Rouvas	7	Dimitris Karagiannis	"You Are So Beautiful"	Vasilis Katsoulas	"The Blower's Daughter"	Team full	Team full	Team full	Team full
Episode 18 (November 24, 2019)	Sakis Rouvas	7	Dimitris Karagiannis	"You Are So Beautiful"	Thanos Zambetakis	"Livin' on a Prayer"	Team full	Team full	Team full	Team full
Episode 18 (November 24, 2019)	Helena Paparizou	8	Elli Platanou	"Son of a Preacher Man"	Konstantina Evaggelopoulou	"My All"	Team full	Team full	Team full	Team full
Episode 18 (November 24, 2019)	Helena Paparizou	8	Elli Platanou	"Son of a Preacher Man"	Evita Valeri	"Ego Milago gia Dinami"	Team full	Team full	Team full	Team full
Episode 18 (November 24, 2019)	Sakis Rouvas	9	Dimitris Gerardos	"All of Me"	Chris Hawks	"Perfect"	Team full	Team full	Team full	Team full
Episode 18 (November 24, 2019)	Sakis Rouvas	9	Dimitris Gerardos	"All of Me"	Vasilis Chatzistefanou	"Rock 'n' Roll Star"	Team full	Team full	Team full	Team full
Episode 18 (November 24, 2019)	Eleonora Zouganeli	10	Argiro Igilizian	"Chain of Fools"	Vaia Kampourani	"Tears in Heaven"	Team full	Team full	Team full	Team full
Episode 18 (November 24, 2019)	Eleonora Zouganeli	10	Argiro Igilizian	"Chain of Fools"	Stavros Tzinidis	"Handra Thalassia"	Team full	Team full	Team full	Team full
Episode 18 (November 24, 2019)	Panos Mouzourakis	11	Marialena Tzivanaki	"Scarborough Fair (ballad)"			Team full	Team full	Team full	Team full
Episode 18 (November 24, 2019)	Panos Mouzourakis	11	Marialena Tzivanaki	"Scarborough Fair (ballad)"	Vangelis Papatzanakis	"If I Can Dream"	Team full	Team full	Team full	Team full
Episode 18 (November 24, 2019)	Helena Paparizou	12	Alexandra Axioti	"Kai Ksafnika"	Giannis Tsarsitalidis	"Ton Eauto tou Paidi"	Team full	Team full	Team full	Team full
Episode 18 (November 24, 2019)	Helena Paparizou	12	Alexandra Axioti	"Kai Ksafnika"	Penny Papageorgiou	"Den Iparhoun Aggeloi"	Team full	Team full	Team full	Team full

== The Battles ==
The Battles started on November 29, 2019. The coaches can each steal two losing artists from another team. Contestants who win their battle or are stolen by another coach will advance to the Live Shows.

Colour key

✔	Coach hit his/her "I WANT YOU" button
	Artist won the Battle and advanced to the Live Shows
	Artist lost the Battle but was stolen by another coach and advances to the Live Shows
	Artist lost the Battle and was eliminated

Episode	Coach	Order	Winner(s)	Song	Loser	'Steal' result			
Episode	Coach	Order	Winner(s)	Song	Loser	Panos	Helena	Sakis	Eleonora
Episode 19 (November 29, 2019)	Panos Mouzourakis	1	Konstantina Ifanti	"To Sose"	Maria Athanasiadi	—N/a	–	–	–
Episode 19 (November 29, 2019)	Eleonora Zouganeli	2	Giorgos Efthimiadis	"Superstition"	Argiro Igilizian	–	–	–	—N/a
Episode 19 (November 29, 2019)	Helena Paparizou	3	Ioanna Theocharidou	"Jolene"	Melissa Kyriakou	–	–	—N/a	–
Episode 19 (November 29, 2019)	Sakis Rouvas	4	Mirto Spyropoulou	"To Kokkino Potami"	Christina Papadopoulou	–	–	—N/a	✔
Episode 19 (November 29, 2019)	Eleonora Zouganeli	5	Manolis Bribos	"Dimosthenous Lekseis"	Konstantinos Tsimouris	–	–	✔	—N/a
Episode 19 (November 29, 2019)	Helena Paparizou	6	Erika Soteri	"Daddy Lessons"	Georgia Daniilidou	✔	—N/a	–	–
Episode 19 (November 29, 2019)	Panos Mouzourakis	7	Nasos Nikolaidis	"Monologos gia Dyo"	Kallia Grinia	—N/a	–	–	–
Episode 19 (November 29, 2019)	Sakis Rouvas	8	Dimitris Gerardos	"Scream"	Sarah Athina Hydar	–	✔	—N/a	–
Episode 19 (November 29, 2019)	Eleonora Zouganeli	9	Manos Makropoulos	"Ego ki Esy"	Anna Renieri	–	–	–	—N/a
Episode 19 (November 29, 2019)	Panos Mouzourakis	10	Kostas Cheilas	"Na Statho sta Podia mou"	Tharrenos Peridis	—N/a	–	–	–
Episode 19 (November 29, 2019)	Sakis Rouvas	11	Dimitris Karagiannis	"I Knew You Were Waiting (For Me)"	Louise Du Toit	–	–	—N/a	–
Episode 19 (November 29, 2019)	Helena Paparizou	12	Elli Platanou	"To Rock"	Thanos Nikolopoulos	–	—N/a	–	–
Episode 19 (November 29, 2019)	Panos Mouzourakis	13	Angelina Statyeva	"Anything Goes"	Katerina Meliti	—N/a	–	–	–
Episode 19 (November 29, 2019)	Eleonora Zouganeli	14	Konstantinos Mathioudakis	"Cheimonas Einai"	Lambis Giakoumakis	–	–	–	—N/a
Episode 20 (December 1, 2019)	Helena Paparizou	1	Makis Meras	"Thelo na Matho"	Antonis Achtipis	–	—N/a	–	–
Episode 20 (December 1, 2019)	Eleonora Zouganeli	2	Elpida Gad	"Trito Stefani"	Andromachi Koskeridou	✔	–	–	—N/a
Episode 20 (December 1, 2019)	Panos Mouzourakis	3	Georgia Tzelati	"Give It Away"	Evaggelos Giannopoulos	Team full	–	–	–
Episode 20 (December 1, 2019)	Sakis Rouvas	4	Aristotelis Polonyfis	"Ola Moiazoun Kalokairi"	Nicole Nikolaidou	Team full	–	—N/a	–
Episode 20 (December 1, 2019)	Helena Paparizou	5	Konstantina Papastefanaki	"Epitelous"	Alexandra Axioti	Team full	—N/a	–	–
Episode 20 (December 1, 2019)	Eleonora Zouganeli	6	Konstantina Kordouli	"Hurt"	Maria Aisiopoulou	Team full	–	–	—N/a
Episode 20 (December 1, 2019)	Sakis Rouvas	7	Marina Memousai	"Who You Are"	Valia Dimou	Team full	–	—N/a	–
Episode 20 (December 1, 2019)	Panos Mouzourakis	8	Tamar Barsamian	"Giati Den Erhesai Pote"	Marina Dresiou	Team full	✔	–	–
Episode 20 (December 1, 2019)	Eleonora Zouganeli	9	Thodoris Verlis	"Ftanei Ftanei"	Anna Capone Pappas	Team full	Team full	✔	—N/a
Episode 20 (December 1, 2019)	Helena Paparizou	10	Konstantinos Frantzis	"Billie Jean"	Stefanos Christoforou	Team full	Team full	Team full	–
Episode 20 (December 1, 2019)	Sakis Rouvas	11	Sonia Iliadi	"Horis Esena"	Manolis Vasilakis	Team full	Team full	Team full	–
Episode 20 (December 1, 2019)	Helena Paparizou	12	Apostolis Diamantopoulos	"Take On Me"	Anastasios Tsolakidis	Team full	Team full	Team full	✔
Episode 20 (December 1, 2019)	Sakis Rouvas	13	Eirini Tsokounoglou	"Prin to Telos"	Giorgos Chouvardas	Team full	Team full	Team full	Team full
Episode 20 (December 1, 2019)	Panos Mouzourakis	14	Marialena Tzivanaki	"Those Were the Days"	Kleopatra Iakovou	Team full	Team full	Team full	Team full

== Live shows ==
=== Elimination chart ===
Color key
Artist's info

- Artist from "Team Panos"
- Artist from "Team Helena"
- Artist from "Team Sakis"
- Artist from "Team Eleonora"

Result details

- Winner
- Runner-up
- Third place
- Fourth place
- Artist was saved by the public
- Artist was eliminated
- Artist did not perform on that particular week

Artist	Week 1		Week 2		Week 3		
Artist	Friday	Sunday	Friday	Sunday	Round 1	Round 2	Round 3
Dimitris Karagiannis	Safe			Safe	Safe	Safe	Winner
Elpida Gad	Safe		Safe		Safe	Safe	Runner-up
Giorgos Efthimiadis		Safe	Safe		Safe	3rd Place	Eliminated (Week 3)
Kostas Cheilas	Safe			Safe	Safe	3rd Place	Eliminated (Week 3)
Eirini Tsokounoglou		Safe		Safe	4th Place	Eliminated (Week 3)	
Elli Platanou		Safe	Safe		4th Place	Eliminated (Week 3)	
Konstantina Papastefanaki	Safe			Safe	4th Place	Eliminated (Week 3)	
Konstantinos Tsimouris	Safe		Safe		4th Place	Eliminated (Week 3)	
Christina Papadopoulou	Safe			Eliminated	Eliminated (Week 2)		
Anna Capone Pappas		Safe		Eliminated	Eliminated (Week 2)		
Konstantinos Frantzis		Safe		Eliminated	Eliminated (Week 2)		
Konstantina Ifanti	Safe			Eliminated	Eliminated (Week 2)		
Anastasios Tsolakidis		Safe		Eliminated	Eliminated (Week 2)		
Konstantina Kordouli		Safe	Eliminated	Eliminated (Week 2)			
Dimitris Gerardos	Safe		Eliminated	Eliminated (Week 2)			
Nasos Nikolaidis		Safe	Eliminated	Eliminated (Week 2)			
Erika Soteri	Safe		Eliminated	Eliminated (Week 2)			
Mirto Spyropoulou		Safe	Eliminated	Eliminated (Week 2)			
Manolis Bribos		Eliminated	Eliminated (Week 1)				
Ioanna Theocharidou		Eliminated	Eliminated (Week 1)				
Tamar Barsamian		Eliminated	Eliminated (Week 1)				
Georgia Tzelati		Eliminated	Eliminated (Week 1)				
Makis Meras		Eliminated	Eliminated (Week 1)				
Aristotelis Polonyfis		Eliminated	Eliminated (Week 1)				
Angelina Statyeva		Eliminated	Eliminated (Week 1)				
Sarah Athina Haidar		Eliminated	Eliminated (Week 1)				
Manos Makropoulos		Eliminated	Eliminated (Week 1)				
Georgia Daniilidou	Eliminated	Eliminated (Week 1)					
Thodoris Verlis	Eliminated	Eliminated (Week 1)					
Marina Dresiou	Eliminated	Eliminated (Week 1)					
Konstantinos Mathioudakis	Eliminated	Eliminated (Week 1)					
Marina Memousai	Eliminated	Eliminated (Week 1)					
Apostolis Diamantopoulos	Eliminated	Eliminated (Week 1)					
Sonia Iliadi	Eliminated	Eliminated (Week 1)					
Marialena Tzivanaki	Eliminated	Eliminated (Week 1)					
Andromachi Koskeridou	Eliminated	Eliminated (Week 1)					

=== Live show details ===
The live shows take place in the Galatsi Olympic Hall in Galatsi, Attica.

Color key

Artist was saved by the public's vote
Artist was eliminated by the public's vote

==== Week 1 ====
===== Cross Battle 1 (December 6) =====
Duel	Order	Coach	Artist	Song	Public Vote	Result
I	1	Eleonora Zouganeli	Elpida Gad	"Na Ziso I na Pethano"	70%	Saved
I	2	Panos Mouzourakis	Andromachi Koskeridou	"Tou Erota Simadi"	30%	Eliminated
II	3	Sakis Rouvas	Dimitris Gerardos	"What Goes Around... Comes Around"	68%	Saved
II	4	Panos Mouzourakis	Marialena Tzivanaki	"Tis Arnis to Nero"	32%	Eliminated
III	5	Helena Paparizou	Erika Soteri	"Ain't Nobody"	65%	Saved
III	6	Sakis Rouvas	Sonia Iliadi	"It's a Man's Man's Man's World"	35%	Eliminated
IV	7	Helena Paparizou	Apostolis Diamantopoulos	"7 Rings"	25%	Eliminated
IV	8	Panos Mouzourakis	Konstantina Ifanti	"Anthropon Erga"	75%	Saved
V	9	Sakis Rouvas	Marina Memousai	"Chandelier"	20%	Eliminated
V	10	Eleonora Zouganeli	Christina Papadopoulou	"Sto'pa kai sto Ksanaleo"	80%	Saved
VI	11	Helena Paparizou	Konstantina Papastefanaki	"Sose Me"	65%	Saved
VI	12	Eleonora Zouganeli	Konstantinos Mathioudakis	"Se Ekdikithika"	35%	Eliminated
VII	13	Helena Paparizou	Marina Dresiou	"Mama Gernao"	40%	Eliminated
VII	14	Sakis Rouvas	Konstantinos Tsimouris	"To Palio mou Palto"	60%	Saved
VIII	15	Panos Mouzourakis	Kostas Cheilas	"Erotokritos (Ta Thlivera Mantata)"	70%	Saved
VIII	16	Eleonora Zouganeli	Thodoris Verlis	"Dui Dui"	30%	Eliminated
IX	17	Panos Mouzourakis	Georgia Daniilidou	"Let It Be"	30%	Eliminated
IX	18	Sakis Rouvas	Dimitris Karagiannis	"They Won't Go When I Go"	70%	Saved

===== Cross Battle 2 (December 8) =====
Duel	Order	Coach	Artist	Song	Public Vote	Result
I	1	Eleonora Zouganeli	Manos Makropoulos	"Mystike mou Erota"	49%	Eliminated
I	2	Sakis Rouvas	Eirini Tsokounoglou	"Misirlou"	51%	Saved
II	3	Panos Mouzourakis	Nasos Nikolaidis	"Poia Nichta se Eklepse"	80%	Saved
II	4	Helena Paparizou	Sarah Athina Haidar	"Bad Guy"	20%	Eliminated
III	5	Panos Mouzourakis	Angelina Statyeva	"To Tango tis Nefelis"	46%	Eliminated
III	6	Eleonora Zouganeli	Anastasios Tsolakidis	"Strong Enough"	54%	Saved
IV	7	Eleonora Zouganeli	Konstantina Kordouli	"Korasin tragoudage"	55%	Saved
IV	8	Sakis Rouvas	Aristotelis Polonyfis	"Kathimerina"	45%	Eliminated
V	9	Helena Paparizou	Makis Meras	"Ola S'agapane"	40%	Eliminated
V	10	Eleonora Zouganeli	Giorgos Efthimiadis	"Psichi Vathia"	60%	Saved
VI	11	Panos Mouzourakis	Georgia Tzelati	"Thimos"	35%	Eliminated
VI	12	Helena Paparizou	Konstantinos Frantzis	"Esoroucha"	65%	Saved
VII	13	Sakis Rouvas	Anna Capone Pappas	"Je Suis Malade"	51%	Saved
VII	14	Panos Mouzourakis	Tamar Barsamian	"Parapono/ I Ksenitia"	49%	Eliminated
VIII	15	Sakis Rouvas	Mirto Spyropoulou	"Je t'aime"	67%	Saved
VIII	16	Helena Paparizou	Ioanna Theocharidou	"Mia Paraskevi"	33%	Eliminated
IX	17	Helena Paparizou	Elli Platanou	"Papa's Got a Brand New Bag"	55%	Saved
IX	18	Eleonora Zouganeli	Manolis Bribos	"Ena Gramma"	45%	Eliminated

==== Week 2 ====
===== Semi-Final 1 (December 13) =====
Order	Coach	Artist	Song	Result
1	Sakis Rouvas	Mirto Spyropoulou	"Pote na min Hatheis Ap'tin Zoi mou"	Eliminated
2	Eleonora Zouganeli	Giorgos Efthimiadis	"Feeling Good"	Saved
3	Helena Paparizou	Erika Soteri	"Is It A Crime"	Eliminated
4	Sakis Rouvas	Konstantinos Tsimouris	"Matia Dichos Logiki"	Saved
5	Eleonora Zouganeli	Elpida Gad	"Agapi (Poso Poly S'agapisa)"	Saved
6	Helena Paparizou	Elli Platanou	"Adonis"	Saved
7	Panos Mouzourakis	Nasos Nikolaidis	"Ena Gramma"	Eliminated
8	Sakis Rouvas	Dimitris Gerardos	"Every Breath You Take"	Eliminated
9	Eleonora Zouganeli	Konstantina Kordouli	"Canção do Mar"	Eliminated

===== Semi-Final 2 (December 15) =====
Order	Coach	Artist	Song	Result
1	Eleonora Zouganeli	Anastasios Tsolakidis	"La Isla Bonita"	Eliminated
2	Helena Paparizou	Konstantina Papastefanaki	"Oso Varoun ta Sidera"	Saved
3	Panos Mouzourakis	Konstantina Ifanti	"Kaigomai Kaigomai"	Eliminated
4	Sakis Rouvas	Dimitris Karagiannis	"Sorry Seems to Be the Hardest Word"	Saved
5	Helena Paparizou	Konstantinos Frantzis	"Ena Tragoudi Akoma"	Eliminated
6	Sakis Rouvas	Anna Capone Pappas	"Theos an Einai"	Eliminated
7	Panos Mouzourakis	Kostas Cheilas	"O Akrovatis"	Saved
8	Eleonora Zouganeli	Christina Papadopoulou	"Ta Smirneika Tragoudia"	Eliminated
9	Sakis Rouvas	Eirini Tsokounoglou	"Mavra Gialia"	Saved

==== Week 3 ====
===== Final (December 22) =====
Coach	Artist	Order	First Song	Order	Second Song	Order	Third Song	Result
Sakis Rouvas	Konstantinos Tsimouris	1	"Let Me Entertain You"	N/A (already eliminated)				Fourth place
Helena Paparizou	Konstantina Papastefanaki	2	"Mia Einai I Ousia"	N/A (already eliminated)				Fourth place
Eleonora Zouganeli	Elpida Gad	3	"Chimonanthos"	9	"Sodade"	13	"Agapi (Poso Poly S'agapisa)'"	Runner-up
Sakis Rouvas	Dimitris Karagiannis	4	"Unchained Melody"	10	"They Won't Go When I Go"	14	"Sorry Seems to Be the Hardest Word"	Winner
Helena Paparizou	Elli Platanou	5	"Proud Mary"	N/A (already eliminated)				Fourth place
Panos Mouzourakis	Kostas Cheilas	6	"Itane mia Fora"	11	"Erotokritos (Ta Thlivera Mantata)"	N/A (already eliminated)		Third place
Sakis Rouvas	Eirini Tsokounoglou	7	"Agori Mou"	N/A (already eliminated)				Fourth place
Eleonora Zouganeli	Giorgos Efthimiadis	8	"San Planodio Tsirko"	12	"You Are My Sunshine"	N/A (already eliminated)		Third place

== Ratings ==
Episode		Date	Timeslot (EET)	Official ratings (in millions)	Rank Daily	Share (Household)
1	"Blind Auditions"	September 27, 2019	Friday 9:00pm	1.251	1	32.3%
2	"Blind Auditions"	September 29, 2019	Sunday 9:00pm	1.102	2	26.9%
3	"Blind Auditions"	October 4, 2019	Friday 9:00pm	1.311	1	32.1%
4	"Blind Auditions"	October 6, 2019	Sunday 9:00pm	1.057	2	24.6%
5	"Blind Auditions"	October 11, 2019	Friday 10:00pm	1.061	1	29.8%
6	"Blind Auditions"	October 13, 2019	Sunday 9:00pm	1.144	2	26.1%
7	"Blind Auditions"	October 18, 2019	Friday 10:00pm	1.056	1	29.2%
8	"Blind Auditions"	October 20, 2019	Sunday 9:00pm	1.300	1	28.6%
9	"Blind Auditions"	October 25, 2019	Friday 10:00pm	1.102	1	31.1%
10	"Blind Auditions"	October 27, 2019	Sunday 9:00pm	1.172	1	29.1%
11	"Blind Auditions"	November 1, 2019	Friday 10:00pm	1.122	1	30.2%
12	"Blind Auditions"	November 3, 2019	Sunday 9:00pm	1.394	1	30.9%
13	"Blind Auditions"	November 8, 2019	Friday 10:00pm	1.172	1	34.2%
14	"Blind Auditions"	November 10, 2019	Sunday 9:00pm	1.354	1	31.0%
15	"Knockouts"	November 15, 2019	Friday 10:00pm	1.063	1	30.8%
16	"Knockouts"	November 17, 2019	Sunday 9:00pm	1.307	1	29.1%
17	"Knockouts"	November 22, 2019	Friday 10:00pm	1.012	1	27.9%
18	"Knockouts"	November 24, 2019	Sunday 9:00pm	1.175	1	26.3%
19	"Battle Rounds"	November 29, 2019	Friday 10:00pm	0.968	1	26.9%
20	"Battle Rounds"	December 1, 2019	Sunday 9:00pm	1.091	1	26.1%
21	"Live Shows"	December 6, 2019	Friday 9:00pm	1.181	1	29.0%
22	"Live Shows"	December 8, 2019	Sunday 9:00pm	1.193	1	26.2%
23	"Live Semi-Final"	December 13, 2019	Friday 9:00pm	1.167	1	28.6%
24	"Live Semi-Final"	December 15, 2019	Sunday 9:00pm	1.282	1	29.6%
25	"Live Final"	December 22, 2019	Sunday 9:00pm	1.516	1	39.0%
