= The Voice of Greece season 3 =

The Voice of Greece
- Season 3
- Hosted by: Giorgos Kapoutzidis; Elena Tsagrinou
- Coaches: Helena Paparizou; Sakis Rouvas; Kostis Maraveyas; Panos Mouzourakis
- Winner: Giannis Margaris
- Winning coach: Kostis Maraveyas
- Runner-up: Kassiani Leipsaki

Release
- Original network: Skai TV; Sigma TV
- Original release: November 16, 2016 – March 2, 2017

Season chronology
- ← Previous; Season 2 Next → Season 4

The third season of the Greek Cypriot reality talent show The Voice of Greece premiered on November 16, 2016 on Skai TV. Based on the reality singing competition The Voice of Holland, the series was created by Dutch television producer John de Mol. It is part of an international series.

The show was hosted by Giorgos Kapoutzidis, with Elena Tsagrinou serving as the backstage and social networking corresponding. Helena Paparizou, Sakis Rouvas, Kostis Maraveyas and Panos Mouzourakis were the new coaches of the season. The winner receives a record deal with Minos EMI. The final took place at Galatsi Olympic Hall and the winner was Giannis Margaris from the team of Kostis Maraveyas.
