= Eleonora Zouganeli =

Greek singer (born 1983)

Eleonora Zouganeli Ελεωνόρα Ζουγανέλη
- Born: February 1, 1983 (age 43); Athens, Greece
- Origin: Mykonos, Greece
- Genres: Éntekhno; rock; laiko
- Occupation: Singer
- Instrument: Vocals
- Years active: 2004–present
- Labels: EMI; Minos EMI
- Spouse: Spiros Dimitriou (m. 2020; div. 2023)
- Father: Giannis Zouganelis

Eleonora Zouganeli (Greek: Ελεωνόρα Ζουγανέλη; born 1 February 1983) is a Greek singer.

== Biography ==
Zouganeli was born in 1983 in Athens and is the daughter of Giannis Zouganelis and Isidora Sideris. From a very young age she was involved as an actress in children's theatrical performances and as a singer in children's songs.

== Discography ==
- Ela (2008)
- Exodos 2 (2010)
- Ipa Stous Filous Mou (2011)
- Metakomisi Tora (2013)
- Na Me Thimase Ke Na M' Agapas – Ta Tragoudia Tis Melinas (2014)
- M' Agapouses Ki Anthize (2015)
- Pou Me Ftasane Oi Erotes (2018)
- Parto Allios (2021)

== Filmography ==
In 2014 Zouganeli participated as a guest star in the movie Apo Erota... written and directed by Theodoris Atheridis.

In 2015 she embodied French singer Edith Piaf in a musical that went on the Stage Kotopouli Rex at the National Theatre of Greece.

In 2017 she participated in Alexis Kardaras' emotional music film entitled Fantasia.

From the 2019–2020 television season she is on the jury of the talent show The Voice of Greece.

== Awards and nominations ==
=== Life & Style Woman of the Year ===
Year	Recipient	Award	Result
2011	Herself	Performer of the Year	Won

=== MAD Video Music Awards ===
Year	Recipient	Award	Result
2009	Ela (feat. Panos Mouzourakis)	Best Pop Video Clip	Nominated
2009	Kopse Ke Mirase	Best Female Artist	Nominated
2010	Kopse Ke Mirase	Best Entekhno Video Clip	Won
2014	Herself	Artist of the Year	Nominated
2015	Herself	Best Adult Female	Nominated
2015	I Epimoni Sou (w/ Kostas Leivadas)	Best Song of the Year	Nominated
2021	Herself	Best Adult Female Singer	Nominated

=== Super Music Awards 2021 ===
Year	Recipient	Award	Result
2021	Herself	Best Adult Female	Nominated
