= The Voice of Greece season 4 =

The Voice of Greece
- Season 4
- Hosted by: Giorgos Kapoutzidis; Laura Narjes
- Coaches: Helena Paparizou; Sakis Rouvas; Kostis Maraveyas; Panos Mouzourakis
- Winner: Yiorgos Zioris
- Winning coach: Kostis Maraveyas
- Runner-up: Stelios Ioakeim

Release
- Original network: Skai TV; Sigma TV
- Original release: October 3 – December 20, 2017

Season chronology
- ← Previous; Season 3 Next → Season 5

The fourth season of the Greek Cypriot reality talent show The Voice of Greece premiered on October 3, 2017 on Skai TV. Based on the reality singing competition The Voice of Holland, the series was created by Dutch television producer John de Mol. It is part of an international series.

On September 13, 2017, Skai TV confirmed that the presenter and the coaches of the previous season would return, while Laura Narges is coming to serving as the new backstage and social networking corresponding, replacing Elena Tsagkrinou.

Yiorgos Zioris won The Voice of Greece 2017 from Team Kostis Maraveyas.

== Selection process ==
=== Pre-Auditions ===
The Pre-Auditions or Pre-Casting begins from Athens.

Auditions with Producers
City	Date(s)	Venue
Athens	22–23 July	Athenaeum Grand Hotel
Athens	3–4 August	Athenaeum Grand Hotel
Athens	24–25 August	Athenaeum Grand Hotel
Athens	27 September	Athenaeum Grand Hotel
Athens	3 October	Athenaeum Grand Hotel
Athens	9–10 September	Galatsi Olympic Hall
Thessaloniki	8–9 August	Grand Hotel Palace
Thessaloniki	29 September	Grand Hotel Palace
Nicosia, Cyprus	11–12 September	Diachronic Music Scene

=== Filming ===
The Voice of Greece 4 began filming Blind Auditions at September 20, 2017 at Galatsi Olympic Hall. The Battle Round began filming on November 9, 2017 at Galatsi Olympic Hall, following the taping of the blind auditions.

== Coaches and presenters ==
In June 2017, Elena Paparizou announced that she would like to take part, in two productions, in 'The Voice' and in the new production that bring in season 2017–2018 Skai TV 'Greece Got Talent' but the channel has decided to run both programs at the same time. On July 26, 2017, Panos Mouzourakis he had gone to Cyprus and in an interview he said that "At the moment I remain in The Voice, unless I close something else that I am very happy about ...". On August 2, 2017, Sakis Rouvas and Elena Paparizou they announced in their Instagram that the pre-casting will begin. On September 13, 2017 Skai TV announced that the fourth coaches from the last season are coming back.

In July 2017 a different channel they said that Giorgos Kapoutzidis would come back to present the second season on Skai TV. On September 20, 2017 Skai TV announced that Laura Narjes is coming to serving as the new backstage and social networking corresponding, replacing Elena Tsagkrinou.

== Teams ==
Color key

- Winner
- Runner-up
- Third place
- Fourth place
- Eliminated in the Live shows
- Eliminated in the Knockouts
- Artist was stolen by another coach in the Knockouts (Name is struck-through)
- Eliminated in the Battles
- Artist was stolen by another coach in the Battle rounds (Name is struck-through)

Coaches	Top 136			
Kostis Maraveyas				
Kostis Maraveyas	Yiorgos Zioris	Konstantina Katsoyianni	Sophia Nassiou	Nikos Floqi
Kostis Maraveyas	Maria Moskofian	Panos Patayiannis	Mary Protopapa	Dorida Chioti
Kostis Maraveyas	~~Konstantinos Kotsadam~~	~~Aggelos Tsimidakis~~		Omiros Baboukis
Kostis Maraveyas	Tzina Sofaditi	Athina Lianou	Mariana Dimousi	Vasia Kaledjoglou
Kostis Maraveyas	Mariam Loria	Manolis Souranakis	Irene Disiou	Aggelos Alepakis
Kostis Maraveyas	Daniela Pouga	Aliko Kasma	Dimitris Douniadakis	Alexandra Misou
Kostis Maraveyas	Olga Bountou	Athanasia Papanastasopoulou	Georgia Ram	Melina Anthopoulou
Kostis Maraveyas	Plousia Ilia	Tina Komioti	Naya Agorastou	Maria Gargaropoulou
Kostis Maraveyas	Grigoris Koutsoukos	Kelly Artemaki	Antonis Trikkis	Theano Tsavousaki
Kostis Maraveyas	Katerina Barbarousi	Dimitris Rousos		
Sakis Rouvas				
Sakis Rouvas	Stelios Ioakeim	Christodoula Tsagara	Dimitris Theodosiadis	Georgia Pratopoulou
Sakis Rouvas	Stelios Psarogianis	Tzortzina Aleksaki	Dimosthenis Vatistas	Michaela Theododou
Sakis Rouvas	~~Vasilis Lambropoulos~~	~~Marina Kyriazopoulou~~		Katerina Bourneli
Sakis Rouvas	Despina Andreou	Evelina Assantourian	Katerina Rally	Giannis Alexakis
Sakis Rouvas	Stavros Tsoukalas	Andry Lagiou	Christiana Sioka	Mara Tzima
Sakis Rouvas	Samir Al-Belati	~~Mariam Loria~~	Gogo Karamaniego	Christina Kyriakou
Sakis Rouvas	Mairi Tsavalia	Markela Chadjimitsi	Apostolos Akriotis	Pantelis Kastanidis
Sakis Rouvas	Panayiotis Georgiou	Despina Sveroni	Panayiotis Malamas	E.J. Soti
Sakis Rouvas	Kasandra Christodoulou	Ilianna Sakellaridi	Yiorgos Eleytherakis	Mania Roumantza
Sakis Rouvas	Maria Theocharopoulou	Yiannis Tsilis		
Helena Paparizou				
Helena Paparizou	Fani Zochiou	Anastasios A. Papanastasiou	Haris Kornaros	Giannis Kesides
Helena Paparizou	Vasilis Lambropoulos	Sofia Agnantopoulou	Manos Koukkos	Aggelos Tsimidakis
Helena Paparizou	~~Mary Protopapa~~		Eleanna Athanasiou	Afroditi Sofianidou
Helena Paparizou	Joe Antonakaki	Vaya Zigoyianni	Nikos Mavris	Elena Armao
Helena Paparizou	Konstantina Karvouniari	Gary Frad	Giannis Karatzas	Leonidas Pachtitis
Helena Paparizou	Korina Ntilenian	~~Panagiotis Redetakos~~	Maria Zygomani	Yiannis Doxas
Helena Paparizou	Nikos Koyiannis	Aristea Alexandraki	Aliki Skarea	Neofyta Stergiou
Helena Paparizou	Aris Farantos	Matthea Spitadaki	Nikoleta Liapi	Konstantinos Kyriakou
Helena Paparizou	Pigi Samara	Konstantinos Konstantinou	Panos Tsikos	Paraskevi Nikolakaki
Helena Paparizou	Lorens Tzaria	Antigoni Sambatakaki		
Panos Mouzourakis				
Panos Mouzourakis	Despina Lemonitsi	Marina Kyriazopoulou	Konstantinos Kotsadam	Andria Aggeli
Panos Mouzourakis	Kostas Bouyiotis	David Kanavos	Ioulia Kalimani	Alex Hamel
Panos Mouzourakis	~~Stelios Ioakeim~~	~~Christodoula Tsagara~~	~~Sophia Nassiou~~	
Panos Mouzourakis	Elena Kambani	Michalis Keramaris	Chloe Chariri	Stavros Germalidis
Panos Mouzourakis	Christina Matsa	Ross Hill	Evita Larkou	Panagiotis Redetakos
Panos Mouzourakis	Yiannis Bekas	~~Vasilis Lambropoulos~~	~~Gary Frad~~	Yiannis Doulias
Panos Mouzourakis	Kyriaki Chatzitheodorou	Niki Miliara	Iosifina Xristodoulou	Ioanna Theodosiadou
Panos Mouzourakis	Katerina Tofia	Myrto Paschou	Giorgos Christodoulakos	Pavlina Konstantinou
Panos Mouzourakis	Pavlos Kitsis	Polina Chadjioannou	Rafaela Piniataro	Stelios Petrakis
Panos Mouzourakis	Zoe Christou	Nikos Moutafidis		

== Blind auditions ==
The blind auditions took place in the Galatsi Olympic Hall in Galatsi, Athens, Greece. Each coach had the length of the artists' performance to decide if they wanted that artist on their team. If two or more coaches have wanted the same artist, then the artist chose their coach. If only one wanted the artist, then the artist was defaulted in his team. Once the coaches picked their team, they pitted them against each other in the Battles.

The blind auditions episodes aired on October 3, 2017.

Color key

✔	Coach hit his/her "ΣΕ ΘΕΛΩ (I want you)" button
	Artist defaulted to this coach's team
	Artist elected to join this coach's team
	Artist eliminated with no coach pressing his or her "ΣΕ ΘΕΛΩ (I want you)" button

=== Episode 1 (October 3) ===
The first blind audition episode was broadcast on October 3, 2017.

Order	Artist	Age	Hometown	Song	Coach's and contestant's choices			
Order	Artist	Age	Hometown	Song	Kostis	Sakis	Elena	Panos
1	Antigoni Sambatakaki	23	Athens, Attica	"Let's Get Loud"	–	–	✔	✔
2	Sophia Michalea	18	Kalamata, Peloponnese	"Nobody's Perfect"	–	–	–	–
3	Olga Bountou	23	Athens, Attica	"Marry the night"	✔	–	–	✔
4	Maria Rigopoulou	21	Thessaloniki, Macedonia	"Ola se thimizoun"	–	–	–	–
5	Samir Al-Belati	40	Thessaloniki, Macedonia	"Tamally Maak"	✔	✔	✔	–
6	Christos Kalatzis	27	Thebes, Attica	"Anathema se"	–	–	–	–
7	Katerina Barbarousi	33	Trikala, Thessaly	"Oh! Darling"	✔	–	✔	–
8	Christiana Sioka	21	Athens, Attica	"Rise up"	✔	✔	✔	✔
9	Takis Fitos	34	Piraeus, Attica	"Here without you"	–	–	–	–
10	Afroditi Sofianidou	33	Thessaloniki, Macedonia	"Mera Nychta"	✔	–	✔	–
11	Evelina Gouzouli	16	Athens, Attica	"Suspicion"	–	–	–	–
12	Sophia Nassiou	30	Volos, Thessaly	"That Man"	✔	✔	✔	✔
13	Maria Papakosta	17	Athens, Attica	"Tha spaso koupes"	–	–	–	–
14	Ross Hill	24	Athens, Attica	"The Number of the Beast"	–	–	✔	✔

=== Episode 2 (October 4) ===
The second blind audition episode was broadcast on October 4, 2017.

Order	Artist	Age	Hometown	Song	Coach's and contestant's choices			
Order	Artist	Age	Hometown	Song	Kostis	Sakis	Elena	Panos
1	Stelios Petrakis	36	Athens, Attica	"Ki esi tha figeis"	–	–	–	✔
2	Mara Tzima	26	Athens, Attica	"Akroyialies Dilina"	✔	✔	✔	✔
3	Nikos Zigoyiannis	24	Giannitsa, Pella	"The Reason"	–	–	–	–
4	Korina Ntilenian	27	Athens, Attica	"Underneath Your Clothes"	–	–	✔	✔
5	Vaya Zigoyianni	24	Didymoteicho, Thrace	"Exotiko Charmani"	✔	–	✔	✔
6	Dan Theo	26	Athens, Attica	"Apolytos Erotas"	–	–	–	–
7	Ioanna Theodosiadou	18	Athens, Attica	"Man Down"	✔	✔	✔	✔
8	Georgia Ram	24	Athens, Attica	"Hero"	✔	–	–	–
9	Andry Lagiou	27	Athens, Attica	"Burn"	✔	✔	✔	✔
10	Fotis Zidianidis		Athens, Attica	"Min tis to peis"	–	–	–	–
11	Maria Gargaropoulou	21	Thessaloniki, Macedonia	"Mirela"	✔	–	✔	–

=== Episode 3 (October 5) ===
The third blind audition episode was broadcast on October 5, 2017.

Order	Artist	Age	Hometown	Song	Coach's and contestant's choices			
Order	Artist	Age	Hometown	Song	Kostis	Sakis	Elena	Panos
1	Manos Koukkos	23	Athens, Attica	"Parallila"	–	–	✔	✔
2	Vaggelis Stefanou	30	Athens, Attica	"Erotas Einai Tharro"	–	–	–	–
3	Dimitris Douniadakis	22	Chania, Crete	"Way Down We Go"	✔	–	–	–
4	Mariam Loria	18	Athens, Attica	"At Last"	✔	✔	–	–
5	Vaios Tsiaras	29	Athens, Attica	"Mono Esi"	–	–	–	–
6	Lorens Tzaria	30	Athens, Attica	"Night In White Satin"	✔	✔	✔	–
7	Pavlos Paloka	17	Athens, Attica	"Don't Look Back In Anger"	–	–	–	–
8	Christina Kyriakou	27	Cyprus	"One Way Or Another"	–	✔	✔	✔
9	Naya Agorastou	22	Athens, Attica	"Meneksedes kai Zoumboulia"	✔	–	–	–
10	Elena Stathi	30	Rhodes, Dodecanese	"Perasmenes Mou Agapes"	–	–	–	–
11	Georgina Aleksaki	29	Heraklion, Crete	"To Dikio Mou"	✔	✔	–	✔
12	Nikos Drouzis	30	Athens, Attica	"Garyfalle"	–	–	–	–
13	Myrto Paschou	22	Thessaloniki, Macedonia	"Alla Mou Len' Ta Matia Mou"	–	–	✔	✔

=== Episode 4 (October 11) ===
The fourth blind audition episode was broadcast on October 11, 2017.

Order	Artist	Age	Hometown	Song	Coach's and contestant's choices			
Order	Artist	Age	Hometown	Song	Kostis	Sakis	Elena	Panos
1	Eleanna Athanasiou	22	Komotini, Thrace	"Alone"	✔	✔	✔	✔
2	Nikos Moutafidis	35	Thessaloniki, Macedonia	"You are my Destiny"	–	–	–	✔
3	Friny Vlachou	27	Patras, Achaea	"Mona Zyga"	–	–	–	–
4	Kyriaki Chatzitheodorou	28	Athens, Attica	"Trelos"	–	✔	–	✔
5	Kostis Sitas	18	Yannena, Ioannina	"Are You Gonna Be My Girl"	–	–	–	–
6	Panos Patayiannis	34	Athens, Attica	"Oneiro Htane"	✔	✔	✔	✔
7	Nancy Chatzitheodoridou	18	Athens, Attica	"Padam Padam"	–	–	–	–
8	Giorgos Christodoulakos	20	Athens, Attica	"Monaxia mou Ola"	–	–	–	✔
9	Mariana Dimousi	23	Athens, Attica	"Sala Sala"	✔	✔	✔	–
10	Kaya Raijmann	26	Netherlands	"Shape of You"	–	–	–	–
11	Daniela Pouga	40	Agrinio, Aetolia-Acarnania	"La Bamba"	✔	–	–	–
12	Stavros Tsoukalas	18	Crete	"Lahni"	✔	✔	✔	✔
13	Julianna Efstathiou	23	Athens, Attica	"Historia De Un Amor"	–	–	–	–
14	Elena Armao	45	Athens, Attica	"Prosopika"	✔	–	✔	–
15	Giannis Kesides	29	Berlin, Germany	"To Psomi tis Xenitias"	–	✔	✔	–
16	Christine Ullorjia	21	Athens, Attica	"Anapantites Kliseis"	–	–	–	–
17	Maria Theocharopoulou	19	Veria, Imathia	"Sy mou Charaxes Poria"	–	✔	–	–
18	Ino Klossy	30	Athens, Attica	"Anathema ton Aitio"	–	–	–	–

=== Episode 5 (October 12) ===
The fifth blind audition episode was broadcast on October 12, 2017.

Order	Artist	Age	Hometown	Song	Coach's and contestant's choices			
Order	Artist	Age	Hometown	Song	Kostis	Sakis	Elena	Panos
1	E.J. Soti		Athens, Attica	"Mama Do"	–	✔	–	✔
2	Athina Mallia	24	Patras, Achaea	"Chano Esena"	–	–	–	–
3	Vaggelis Vadekas	28	Serres, Macedonia	"Tosa Grammata"	–	–	–	–
4	Theano Tsavousaki	38	Athens, Attica	"Giati Fovase"	✔	–	–	–
5	Rallou Intzirtzi	38	Athens, Attica	"Zita mou o, ti thes"	–	–	–	–
6	Nikos Koyiannis	22	Thessaloniki, Macedonia	"Dirty Diana"	–	–	✔	–
7	Anastasia Kelesidi	22	Athens, Attica	"Ola s'agapane"	–	–	–	–
8	Rafaela Piniataro	18	Volos, Magnesia	"Wake me up"	–	–	✔	✔
9	Anthi Kariofily	16	Thessaloniki, Macedonia	"Something's Got A Hold On Me"	–	–	–	–
10	Elena Kambani	23	Chalkidiki, Macedonia	"Seven Nation Army"	–	–	–	✔
11	Giannis Alexakis	27	Athens, Attica	"Dio Psemata"	✔	✔	–	–
12	Katerina Tofia	25	Cyprus	"Million Reasons"	–	✔	–	✔
13	Dorida Chioti	32	Athens, Attica	"Think"	✔	✔	✔	✔
14	Yro Rally	19	Athens, Attica	"Einai Mikri i Zoi"	–	–	–	–
15	Kostas Bouyiotis	35	Athens, Attica	"I who have Nothing"	✔	✔	✔	✔
16	Maria Moskofian	25	Cyprus	"Spente Le Stelle"	✔	✔	✔	✔
17	Vasilis Tzikas	28	Elassona, Larissa	"To Kyma"	–	–	–	–
18	Giannis Karatzas	22	Thessaloniki, Macedonia	"Boulevard of Broken Dreams"	–	–	✔	–
19	Lemonis Skopelitis	39	Chalcis, Sterea Ellada	"Rotisa ta matia mou"	–	–	–	–

=== Episode 6 (October 18) ===
The sixth blind audition episode was broadcast on October 18, 2017.

Order	Artist	Age	Hometown	Song	Coach's and contestant's choices			
Order	Artist	Age	Hometown	Song	Kostis	Sakis	Elena	Panos
1	Aggelos Alepakis	27	Thessaloniki, Macedonia	"I nyphi pou forouse mavra"	✔	–	–	✔
2	Stefanos Saroukos	28	Kalymnos, Dodecanese	"Kalokairia kai Chimones"	–	–	–	–
3	Aggelos Tsimidakis			"On Broadway"	✔	✔	✔	✔
4	Evita Larkou	22	Larnaca, Cyprus	"Listen"	–	–	–	✔
5	Elena Papaioannou	31	Athens, Attica	"Hold the Line"	–	–	–	–
6	Mary Protopapa	26	Rhodes, Dodecanese	"House of the Rising Sun"	–	✔	✔	✔
7	Alex Hamel	26	Athens, Attica	"Take it Easy"	–	✔	✔	✔
8	Vasilis Tsaklidis	23	Athens, Attica	"It's my life"	–	–	–	–
9	Antonis Trikkis	22	Cyprus	"Oneiro Itane"	✔	–	–	–
10	Haris Kornaros	23	Athens, Attica	"Lady Grinning soul"	✔	✔	✔	✔
11	Zoe Christou	26	Athens, Attica	"Ti ekana gia parti mou"	–	–	–	✔
12	Katerina Bourneli	30	Ios, Cyclades	"California Dreaming"	✔	✔	✔	✔
13	Marianna Pieretti	33	Cyprus	"Prigipas ki Alitis"	–	–	–	–
14	Giorgos Kontaxakis	24	Athens, Attica	"Prin peis s'agapo"	–	–	–	–

=== Episode 7 (October 19) ===
The seventh blind audition episode was broadcast on October 19, 2017.

Order	Artist	Age	Hometown	Song	Coach's and contestant's choices			
Order	Artist	Age	Hometown	Song	Kostis	Sakis	Elena	Panos
1	Panagiotis Redetakos	34	Athens, Attica	"O Salonikios"	–	–	✔	–
2	Konstantina Katsoyianni	16	Tripoli, Peloponnese	"Stereotypa"	✔	–	–	✔
3	Sofia Proimou			"Ta Chartina"	–	–	–	–
4	Gary Frad	37	Athens, Attica	"Min m'aggizeis"	–	✔	–	✔
5	Marina Pigasiou	30	Athens, Attica	"Pes mou mia leksi"	–	–	–	–
6	Marina Kyriazopoulou	23	Veria, Macedonia	"Love on the Brain"	✔	✔	✔	✔
7	Maria Zygomani	21	Florina, Macedonia	"New Rules"	–	✔	✔	✔
8	Polina Chadjioannou	21	Larnaca, Cyprus	"It's a man's world"	–	✔	–	✔
9	Zoe Kanakidou	41	Thessaloniki, Macedonia	"Nychta Stasou"	–	–	–	–
10	Athina Lianou	24	Larnaca, Cyprus	"Caruso"	✔	✔	✔	✔
11	Michaela Theododou	22	Larnaca, Cyprus	"The phantom of the opera"	✔	✔	✔	✔
12	Varvara Mavraki	20	Thessaloniki, Macedonia	"Mirela"	–	–	–	–
13	Tasos Georgoudios	23	Tripoli, Peloponnese	"San star tou cinema"	–	–	–	–
14	Konstantinos Kyriakou	26	Cyprus	"Somebody told me"	–	–	✔	–
15	Dimitra Milona	23	Athens, Attica	"Kryfto"	–	–	–	–
16	Despina Papadopoulou	27	Berlin, Germany	"Mystike mou erota"	–	–	–	–

=== Episode 8 (October 25) ===
The eight blind audition episode was broadcast on October 25, 2017.

Order	Artist	Age	Hometown	Song	Coach's and contestant's choices			
Order	Artist	Age	Hometown	Song	Kostis	Sakis	Elena	Panos
1	Aristea Alexandraki	16	Athens, Attica	"Something's got a hold on me"	✔	–	✔	–
2	Katerina Gouleta	39	Athens, Attica	"Tha ta Vrontikso"	–	–	–	–
3	Fani Zochiou	27	Corfu, Eptanese	"Still got the blues"	✔	✔	✔	–
4	David Kanavos	23	Athens, Attica	"Thinking out loud"	✔	✔	✔	✔
5	Despina Sveroni	32	Volos, Thessaly	"Den zitao polla"	–	✔	–	–
6	Nikos Floqi	27	Athens, Attica	"Mamma"	✔	✔	✔	✔
7	Christodoula Tsagara	23	Larnaca, Cyprus	"Ta leme"	✔	✔	✔	✔
8	Andria Aggeli	24	Nicosia, Cyprus	"Halo"	–	✔	–	✔
9	Ilianna Sakellaridi	25	Athens, Attica	"Mad about you"	–	✔	–	–
10	Athanasia Papanastasopoulou	16	Amaliada, Western Greece	"O Doctor"	✔	✔	✔	–
11	Dimitris Eginitis	28	Athens, Attica	"Misirlou"	–	–	–	–
12	Georgia Yiota	24	Athens, Attica	"Domino"	–	–	–	–
13	Aliki Skalea	25	Kalamata, Peloponnese	"I Mposanova tou isaya"	–	–	✔	–
14	Vasiliki Papatheochari	36	Athens, Attica	"One moment in time"	–	–	–	–

=== Episode 9 (October 26) ===
The ninth blind audition episode was broadcast on October 26, 2017.

Order	Artist	Age	Hometown	Song	Coach's and contestant's choices			
Order	Artist	Age	Hometown	Song	Kostis	Sakis	Elena	Panos
1	Irene Disiou	30	Thessaloniki, Macedonia	"Asta ola kai ela"	✔	✔	–	–
2	Maria Alevizou	22	Kalamata, Peloponnese	"Take it easy"	–	–	–	–
3	Matthea Spitadaki	24	Crete	"I put a spell on you"	–	–	✔	–
4	Rafaela Papamali	25	Athens, Attica	"Polles Fores"	–	–	–	–
5	Tina Komioti	43	Athens, Attica	"Time to say Goodbye"	✔	✔	✔	✔
6	Sofia Agnantopoulou	24	Karditsa, Thessaly	"A change is gonna come"	✔	✔	✔	✔
7	Rafaela Datidou	22	Cyprus	"Apopse thelo na pio"	–	–	–	–
8	Plousia Ilia	21	Mytilene, North Aegean	"An einai i agapi amartia"	✔	–	✔	–
9	Despina Lemonitsi	23	Athens, Attica	"Just Hold Me"	–	✔	–	✔
10	Leonidas Pachtitis	36	Kalamata, Peloponnese	"Trito Stefani"	✔	✔	✔	✔
11	Christina Matsa	23	Cyprus	"Je T' Aime"	✔	✔	✔	✔
12	Polina Lavda	19	Athens, Attica	"Russian Rulette"	–	–	–	–
13	Stavros Germalidis	31	Athens, Attica	"Ki eheis ton tropo"	–	–	–	✔
14	Nefeli Akrivopoulou	19	Thessaloniki, Macedonia	"You're the one that I want"	–	–	–	–
15	Mania Roumantza	38	Athens, Attica	"Closer"	–	✔	✔	–

=== Episode 10 (November 1) ===
The tenth blind audition episode was broadcast on November 1, 2017.

Order	Artist	Age	Hometown	Song	Coach's and contestant's choices			
Order	Artist	Age	Hometown	Song	Kostis	Sakis	Elena	Panos
1	Dimosthenis Vatistas	18	Athens, Attica	"Euphoria"	–	✔	–	–
2	Panos Tsikos	42	Serres, Central Macedonia	"Oh sole mio"	✔	✔	✔	–
3	Dimitra Sachanidou	16	Drama, Eastern Macedonia and Thrace	"Tzivaeri"	–	–	–	–
4	Spiridoula Zineli			"Den eimai theos"	–	–	–	
5	Kasandra Christodoulou	35	Athens, Attica	"You lost me"	–	✔	–	–
6	Maria Kaplanidi	20	Cyprus	"I don't want to miss a thing"	–	–	–	–
7	Mairi Tsavalia	27	Piraeus, Attica	"Mad about you"	–	✔	–	–
8	Kelly Artemaki	27	Karditsa, Thessaly	"I Garsona"	✔	–	–	–
9	Yiannis Doulias	24	Argos, Peloponnese (region)	"Damn your eyes"	✔	✔	✔	✔
10	Yiannis Doxas	35	Piraeus, Attica	"Ta Kleidia"	–	✔	✔	–
11	Chloe Chariri	21	Athens, Attica	"Love me like you"	–	–	✔	✔
12	Neofyta Stergiou	18	Cyprus	"Diefhon"	✔	✔	✔	–
13	Gina Sofaditi	20	Athens, Attica	"On my own"	✔	✔	✔	✔
14	Helena Machfouz	24	Athens, Attica	"Long train runnin'"	–	–	–	–
15	Gogo Karamaniego	20	Lamia, Central Greece (region)	"Milao gia dynami"	–	✔	–	–
16	Christos Dalamagas	27	Arcadia, Peloponnese (region)	"Mono mia fora"	–	–	–	–

=== Episode 11 (November 2) ===
The eleven blind audition episode was broadcast on November 2, 2017.

Order	Artist	Age	Hometown	Song	Coach's and contestant's choices			
Order	Artist	Age	Hometown	Song	Kostis	Sakis	Elena	Panos
1	Konstantina Karvouniari	28	Patras, Western Greece	"Ksana Mana"	–	–	✔	–
2	Despina Andreou	29	Cyprus	"An"	✔	✔	–	–
3	Aris Kolovos	27	Karditsa, Thessaly	"Anapoda"	–	–	–	–
4	Michalis Keramaris	26	Alexandroupoli, Eastern Macedonia and Thrace	"What about now"	–	✔	–	✔
5	Athina Koutsokosta	28	Athens, Attica	"Yia na se sinantiso"	–	–	–	–
6	Panayiotis Malamas	35	Kalamata, Peloponnese	"Spasmeno karavi"	✔	✔	–	–
7	Nasos Katsinas	30	Avlonas, Attica	"Pirosvestiras"	–	–	–	–
8	Alexandra Misou	17	Cyprus	"Memory"	✔	–	–	✔
9	Yiannis Bekas	33	Thessaloniki, Macedonia	"Tolmo"	–	–	✔	✔
10	Aldion Zeqo	19	Albania	"Stohos"	–	–	–	–
11	Katerina Rally	25	Katerini, Central Macedonia	"Marrakesh night market"	–	✔	–	✔
12	Yiorgos Kalaritis	20	Salamis Island, Attica	"Kai lege lege"	–	–	–	–
13	Pigi Samara	28	Thessaloniki, Macedonia	"So what"	✔	✔	✔	✔
14	Ioulia Kalimani	27	Agrinio, Western Greece	"Makria mou na figeis"	✔	✔	✔	✔
15	Nikos Lezas	34	Athens, Attica	"Alli mia eykeria"	–	–	–	–
16	Apostolos Akriotis	36	Athens, Attica	"To 69' me kapio filo"	–	✔	–	–
17	Ioanna Megayiani	23	Oropos, Attica	"Chilies Siopes"	–	–	–	–

=== Episode 12 (November 7) ===
The twelve blind audition episode was broadcast on November 7, 2017.

Order	Artist	Age	Hometown	Song	Coach's and contestant's choices			
Order	Artist	Age	Hometown	Song	Kostis	Sakis	Elena	Panos
1	Aris Farantos		Athens, Attica	"Sighorese me"	–	–	✔	–
2	Yiannis Tsilis	41	Corinth, Peloponnese	"I nihta myrizei giasemi"	–	✔	✔	–
3	Katerina Zoumi			"Ain't no sunshine"	–	–	–	–
4	Pavlina Konstantinou			"What's up"	–	–	–	✔
5	Dimitris Rousos	24	Athens, Attica	"Thelo na giriso"	✔	–	✔	–
6	Soli Ioxana	29	Athens, Attica	"Petao"	–	–	–	–
7	Pavlos Kitsis	30	Cyprus	"Enter Sandman"	–	✔	✔	✔
8	Paraskevi Nikolakaki	23	Sparta, Peloponnese	"Make it rain"	✔	✔	✔	–
9	Grigoris Markelis	31	Thessaloniki, Macedonia	"Ma pou na pao"	–	–	–	–
10	Yiorgos Zioris	23	Arta, Epirus	"That's life"	✔	✔	✔	✔
11	Kaliopi Panti	18	Veria, Central Macedonia	"Damn your eyes"	–	–	–	–
12	Markela Chadjimitsi	22	Cyprus	"Mamma knows best"	✔	✔	✔	✔
13	Manolis Souranakis	26	Athens, Attica	"To 'pes"	✔	✔	✔	–
14	Christina Karidia	23	Athens, Attica	"Mercy"	–	–	–	–
15	Efi Sidiropoulou	37	Thessaloniki, Macedonia	"Mi milas den einai aparetito"	–	–	–	–
16	Pantelis Kastanidis	34	Patras, Western Greece	"Poses Fores"	–	✔	✔	–
17	Christiana Zarou	31	Aigio, Western Greece	"Eleges"	–	–	–	–
18	Stelios Ioakeim	24	Cyprus	"Superstition"	–	✔	✔	✔
19	Stefanos Mikronis	37	Patras, Western Greece	"Gia sena"	–	–	–	–

=== Episode 13 (November 8) ===
The thirteen blind audition episode was broadcast on November 8, 2017.

Order	Artist	Age	Hometown	Song	Coach's and contestant's choices			
Order	Artist	Age	Hometown	Song	Kostis	Sakis	Elena	Panos
1	Grigoris Koutsoukos	33	Salamis Island, Attica	"I fantasia"	✔	✔	–	–
2	Alexandros Kontosoros	27	Corfu, Ionian Islands	"Kapnos"	–	–	–	–
3	Dimitris Theodosiadis	22	Athens, Attica	"Trava Skandali"	–	✔	–	–
4	Georgia Daveta	23	Cyprus	"An me deis na klaio"	–	–	–	–
5	Nikos Mavris	38	Eleusis, Attica	"Ti na thimitho"	–	–	✔	–
6	Vasilis Lambropoulos	33	Athens, Attica	"Chandelier"	✔	–	–	✔
7	Melina Anthopoulou	35	Piraeus, Attica	"The Rose"	✔	✔	✔	✔
8	Irilena Babionitaki	21	Drama, Greece	"Nobody's Perfect"	–	–	–	–
9	Yiorgos Eleftherakis	26	Corfu, Ionian Islands	"To treno"	–	✔	–	–
10	Iro Mavreli	23	Kavala, Eastern Macedonia and Thrace	"Fovamai"	–	–	–	–
11	Panayiotis Georgiou	23	Cyprus	"Mou 'xeis kanei tin zoi mou kolasi"	–	✔	✔	–
12	Vasia Kaledjoglou	20	Chalcis, Central Greece	"Ayti i nyxta menei"	✔	✔	✔	–
13	Joe Antonakaki	18	Crete	"Tis arnis to nero"	✔	✔	✔	✔
14	Eleni Batha	35	Thessaloniki, Macedonia	"Milo gia sena"	–	–	–	–
15	Christina Gemidopoulou	30	Athens, Attica	"Gioulbahar"	–	–	–	–
16	Nikoleta Liapi	19	Lemnos, North Aegean	"Tetarti Vradi"	–	✔	✔	–
17	Despina Papadopoulou	18	Athens, Attica	"Hallelujah"	–	–	–	–
18	Aggeliki Rosolatou		Athens, Attica	"Piece of my heart"	–	–	–	–

=== Episode 14 (November 15) ===
The final blind audition episode was broadcast on November 15, 2017.

Order	Artist	Age	Hometown	Song	Coach's and contestant's choices			
Order	Artist	Age	Hometown	Song	Kostis	Sakis	Elena	Panos
1	Konstantinos Kotsadam	36	Livadeia	"Ta Kleidia"	✔	–	✔	–
2	Faih Stefani	22	Lamia, Phthiotis	"Se vlepo sto potiri mou"	–	–	–	–
3	Aliko Kasma	16	Albania	"Gia pou to 'vales kardia mou"	✔	–	–	–
4	Rafail Silaios	19	Patras, Achaea	"Tonight"	–	–	–	–
5	Evelina Assantourian	19	Armenia	"You don't own me"	✔	✔	–	–
6	Katerina Dimitriou	30	Yannena, Ioannina	"Killing me softly with his song"	–	–	–	–
7	Stelios Psarogianis	22	Athens, Attica	"When a blind man cries"	–	✔	✔	✔
8	Maritina Stayrakara	20	Serres, Macedonia	"Menexedes kai zouboulia"	–	–	–	–
9	Giorgos Sourvinos	23	Athens, Attica	"Asimenia sfika"	–	–	–	–
10	Anastasios Papanastasiou	34	Sweden	"An mou tilefonouses"	✔	✔	✔	✔
11	Iosifina Xristodoulou	18	Athens, Attica	"Riptide"	✔	–	✔	✔
12	Georgia Pratopoulou	34	Crete	"Moira mou egines"	–	✔	✔	✔
13	Valentinos Xaralampous	29	Larnaca, Cyprus	"To parti"	–	Team full	–	–
14	Niki Miliara	46	Athens, Attica	"Mana mou ellas"	–	Team full	–	✔
15	Alexandros Papanikolaou	25	Drama, Eastern Macedonia and Thrace	"Exo ena kafene"	–	Team full	–	Team full
16	Konstantinos Konstantinou	27	Larnaca, Cyprus	"Pou na exigo"	–	Team full	✔	Team full
17	Katerina Oikonomaki	20	Kalamata, Peloponnese	"To Lathos"	–	Team full	Team full	Team full
18	Omiros Baboukis	26	Piraeus, Attica	"Enas tourkos sto parisi"	✔	Team full	Team full	Team full
19	Andriana Psixoula	20	Patras, Western Greece	"Creep"	Team full	Team full	Team full	Team full

== Battle rounds ==
Filming for the battles began on November 9, 2017 at Galatsi Olympic Hall, following the taping of the blind auditions. Each coach has only one steal.

The first part of the battle rounds was broadcast on November 16, 2017 until November 28, 2017.

Colour key

✔	Coach hit his/her "I WANT YOU" button
	Artist won the Battle and advanced to the Knockouts
	Artist lost the Battle but was stolen by another coach and advances to the Knockouts
	Artist lost the Battle and was eliminated

=== Episode 1 (November 16) ===
The first battle round episode was broadcast on November 16, 2017.

Order	Coach	Artists		Song	Coaches' and artists choices			
Order	Coach	Winner	Loser	Song	Kostis	Sakis	Elena	Panos
1	Team Helena	Korina Ntilenian	Antigoni Sambatakaki	"Mantissa"	–	–	—N/a	–
2	Team Kostis	Yiorgos Zioris	Dimitris Rousos	"Walk this way"	—N/a	–	–	–
3	Team Panos	Kostas Bouyiotis	Nikos Moutafidis	"The great pretender"	–	–	–	—N/a
4	Team Sakis	Samir Al-Belati	Yiannis Tsilis	"Aicha"	–	—N/a	–	–
5	Team Kostis	Maria Moskofian	Katerina Barbarousi	"Hello"	—N/a	–	–	–
6	Team Sakis	Mara Tzima	Maria Theocharopoulou	"Tis kalinichtas ta filia"	–	—N/a	–	–
7	Team Helena	Giannis Kesides	Panagiotis Redetakos	"Kato ap' to poukamiso mou"	–	–	—N/a	✔
8	Team Panos	Ioulia Kalimani	Zoe Christou	"Mia kokkini grammi"	–	–	–	Team full
9	Team Helena	Fani Zochiou	Lorens Tzaria	"Old time Rock n' Roll"	–	–	—N/a	Team full
10	Team Panos	Yiannis Bekas	Stelios Petrakis	"Fila me"	–	–	–	Team full
11	Team Kostis	Daniela Pouga	Theano Tsavousaki	"Malo"	—N/a	–	–	Team full
12	Team Sakis	Michaela Theododou	Mania Roumantza	"Summertime"	–	—N/a	–	Team full
13	Team Kostis	Aggelos Alepakis	Antonis Trikkis	"Viastiko pouli tou notou"	—N/a	–	–	Team full

=== Episode 2 (November 21) ===
The second battle round episode was broadcast on November 21, 2017.

Order	Coach	Artists		Song	Coaches' and artists choices			
Order	Coach	Winner	Loser	Song	Kostis	Sakis	Elena	Panos
1	Team Kostis	Irene Disiou	Kelly Artemaki	"Kleise ta matia sou"	—N/a	–	–	Team full
2	Team Sakis	Dimitris Theodosiadis	Yiorgos Eleytherakis	"Notos"	–	—N/a	–	Team full
3	Team Panos	Andria Aggeli	Rafaela Piniataro	"These words"	–	–	–	Team full
4	Team Helena	Sofia Agnantopoulou	Paraskevi Nikolakaki	"Sweet dreams"	–	–	—N/a	Team full
5	Team Kostis	Manolis Souranakis	Grigoris Koutsoukos	"Malagueña salerosa"	—N/a	–	–	Team full
6	Team Sakis	Marina Kyriazopoulou	Ilianna Sakellaridi	"Rockabye"	–	—N/a	–	Team full
7	Team Helena	Leonidas Pachtitis	Panos Tsikos	"Ekdromi"	–	–	—N/a	Team full
8	Team Panos	Evita Larkou	Polina Chadjioannou	"Cry me a river"	–	–	–	Team full
9	Team Sakis	Christiana Sioka	Mariam Loria	"And i am telling you i'm not going"	✔	—N/a	–	Team full
10	Team Kostis	Vasia Kaledjoglou	Maria Gargaropoulou	"Mia mera mias Meris"	Team full	–	–	Team full
11	Team Helena	Giannis Karatzas	Konstantinos Konstantinou	"Me tin porta anoichti"	Team full	–	—N/a	Team full
12	Team Panos	Ross Hill	Pavlos Kitsis	"Chop suey"	Team full	–	–	Team full
13	Team Kostis	Mariana Dimousi	Naya Agorastou	"Ta ziliarika sou matia"	Team full	–	–	Team full
14	Team Helena	Haris Kornaros	Pigi Samara	"No ordinary love"	Team full	–	—N/a	Team full

=== Episode 3 (November 22) ===
The third battle round episode was broadcast on November 22, 2017.

Order	Coach	Artists		Song	Coaches' and artists choices			
Order	Coach	Winner	Loser	Song	Kostis	Sakis	Elena	Panos
1	Team Panos	Christina Matsa	Pavlina Konstantinou	"The winner takes it all"	Team full	–	–	Team full
2	Team Helena	Manos Koukkos	Konstantinos Kyriakou	"Kapoies Fores"	Team full	–	—N/a	Team full
3	Team Kostis	Nikos Floqi	Tina Komioti	"The music of the night"	Team full	–	–	Team full
4	Team Panos	Stavros Germalidis	Giorgos Christodoulakos	"Ta karavia mou kaio"	Team full	–	–	Team full
5	Team Sakis	Tzortzina Aleksaki	Kasandra Christodoulou	"Den les kouventa"	Team full	—N/a	–	Team full
6	Team Helena	Anastasios Papanastasiou	Nikoleta Liapi	"Pare me agalia kai pame"	Team full	–	—N/a	Team full
7	Team Panos	Stelios Ioakeim	Gary Frad	"Two princes"	Team full	–	✔	Team full
8	Team Sakis	Andry Lagiou	E.J. Soti	"Holding out for a hero"	Team full	—N/a	Team full	Team full
9	Team Helena	Konstantina Karvouniari	Matthea Spitadaki	"Lush life"	Team full	–	Team full	Team full
10	Team Kostis	Konstantinos Kotsadam	Plousia Ilia	"I paravasi"	Team full	–	Team full	Team full
11	Team Sakis	Stavros Tsoukalas	Panayiotis Malamas	"Astra min me malonete"	Team full	—N/a	Team full	Team full
12	Team Panos	Sophia Nassiou	Myrto Paschou	"Mia alli eftychia"	Team full	–	Team full	Team full
13	Team Kostis	Panos Patayiannis	Melina Anthopoulou	"The time of my life"	Team full	–	Team full	Team full
14	Team Sakis	Georgia Pratopoulou	Despina Sveroni	"Me to idio mako"	Team full	—N/a	Team full	Team full

=== Episode 4 (November 23) ===
The fourth battle round episode was broadcast on November 23, 2017.

Order	Coach	Artists		Song	Coaches' and artists choices			
Order	Coach	Winner	Loser	Song	Kostis	Sakis	Elena	Panos
1	Team Helena	Elena Armao	Aris Farantos	"S'agapo"	Team full	–	Team full	Team full
2	Team Sakis	Giannis Alexakis	Panayiotis Georgiou	"Aporo me tin kardia mou"	Team full	—N/a	Team full	Team full
3	Team Panos	Chloe Chariri	Katerina Tofia	"Don't let me down again"	Team full	–	Team full	Team full
4	Team Kostis	Dorida Chioti	Georgia Ram	"Cheek to cheek"	Team full	–	Team full	Team full
5	Team Panos	Alex Hamel	Vasilis Lambropoulos	"Free Falling"	Team full	✔	Team full	Team full
6	Team Sakis	Katerina Rally	Pantelis Kastanidis	"Mono gia keini mi mou les"	Team full	Team full	Team full	Team full
7	Team Helena	Nikos Mavris	Neofyta Stergiou	"Prin to telos"	Team full	Team full	Team full	Team full
8	Team Panos	Despina Lemonitsi	Ioanna Theodosiadou	"Say something"	Team full	Team full	Team full	Team full
9	Team Kostis	Konstantina Katsoyianni	Athanasia Papanastasopoulou	"Mi mou xanafigeis pia"	Team full	Team full	Team full	Team full
10	Team Helena	Vaya Zigoyianni	Aliki Skarea	"Otan sou xoreyo"	Team full	Team full	Team full	Team full
11	Team Sakis	Stelios Psarogianis	Apostolos Akriotis	"Sweet home Alabama"	Team full	Team full	Team full	Team full
12	Team Kostis	Athina Lianou	Olga Bountou	"Here comes the rain again"	Team full	Team full	Team full	Team full
13	Team Panos	Michalis Keramaris	Iosifina Xristodoulou	"Stay"	Team full	Team full	Team full	Team full
14	Team Helena	Joe Antonakaki	Aristea Alexandraki	"Ta isixa vradia"	Team full	Team full	Team full	Team full

=== Episode 5 (November 28) ===
The final battle round episode was broadcast on November 28, 2017.

Order	Coach	Artists		Song	Coaches' and artists choices			
Order	Coach	Winner	Loser	Song	Kostis	Sakis	Elena	Panos
1	Team Panos	Christodoula Tsagara	Niki Miliara	"Ta Methisia"	Team full	Team full	Team full	Team full
2	Team Sakis	Evelina Assantourian	Markela Chadjimitsi	"I say a little prayer"	Team full	Team full	Team full	Team full
3	Team Kostis	Tzina Sofaditi	Alexandra Misou	"Dancing Queen"	Team full	Team full	Team full	Team full
4	Team Helena	Mary Protopapa	Nikos Koyiannis	"Hotel California"	Team full	Team full	Team full	Team full
5	Team Sakis	Dimosthenis Vatistas	Mairi Tsavalia	"Writing's on the wall"	Team full	Team full	Team full	Team full
6	Team Kostis	Aggelos Tsimidakis	Dimitris Douniadakis	"Another Love"	Team full	Team full	Team full	Team full
7	Team Helena	Afroditi Sofianidou	Yiannis Doxas	"Antikrista"	Team full	Team full	Team full	Team full
8	Team Panos	Elena Kambani	Kyriaki Chatzitheodorou	"You and I"	Team full	Team full	Team full	Team full
9	Team Helena	Eleanna Athanasiou	Maria Zygomani	"Havana"	Team full	Team full	Team full	Team full
10	Team Sakis	Despina Andreou	Christina Kyriakou	"O Anthropakos"	Team full	Team full	Team full	Team full
11	Team Kostis	Omiros Baboukis	Aliko Kasma	"To Tsigaro"	Team full	Team full	Team full	Team full
12	Team Panos	David Kanavos	Yiannis Doulias	"Counting stars"	Team full	Team full	Team full	Team full
13	Team Sakis	Katerina Bourneli	Gogo Karamaniego	"Methismeni politeia"	Team full	Team full	Team full	Team full

== Knockouts ==
Filming for the knockouts began in November 2017 at Galatsi Olympic Hall, following the taping of the blind auditions and battle rounds. Each coach has only two steal.

The Knockouts rounds was broadcast from November 29, 2017 until December 5, 2017.

Colour key

✔	Coach hit his/her "I WANT YOU" button
	Artist won the Knockout and advanced to the Live Shows
	Artist lost the Knockout but was stolen by another coach and advances to the Live Shows
	Artist lost the Knockout and was eliminated

Episode	Coach	Order	Winner		Losers		'Steal' result			
Episode	Coach	Order	Artist	Song	Artists	Song	Kostis	Sakis	Elena	Panos
Episode 20 (November 29, 2017)	Team Sakis	1	Stelios Psarogianis	"Hey You"	Katerina Rally	"Lose You"	–	—N/a	–	–
Episode 20 (November 29, 2017)	Team Sakis	1	Stelios Psarogianis	"Hey You"	Andry Lagiou	"Temple of the King"	–	—N/a	–	–
Episode 20 (November 29, 2017)	Team Helena	2	Fani Zochiou	"Sose Me"	Leonidas Pachtitis	"Lane Moje"	–	–	—N/a	–
Episode 20 (November 29, 2017)	Team Helena	2	Fani Zochiou	"Sose Me"	Nikos Mavris	"Rock N' Roll sto Krevati"	–	–	—N/a	–
Episode 20 (November 29, 2017)	Team Panos	3	Andria Aggeli	"My All"	Christodoula Tsagara	"Sinaylia"	✔	✔	–	—N/a
Episode 20 (November 29, 2017)	Team Panos	3	Andria Aggeli	"My All"	Stavros Germalidis	"Ti Na Thimitho"	–	–	–	—N/a
Episode 20 (November 29, 2017)	Team Kostis	4	Yiorgos Zioris	"Saba Mou Xigiese"	Athina Lianou	"Poso Lipame"	—N/a	–	–	–
Episode 20 (November 29, 2017)	Team Kostis	4	Yiorgos Zioris	"Saba Mou Xigiese"	Daniela Pouga	"Natural Woman"	—N/a	–	–	–
Episode 20 (November 29, 2017)	Team Panos	5	David Kanavos	"Impossible"	Michalis Keramaris	"Here Without You"	–	–	–	—N/a
Episode 20 (November 29, 2017)	Team Panos	5	David Kanavos	"Impossible"	Sophia Nassiou	"Kiss"	✔	–	–	—N/a
Episode 20 (November 29, 2017)	Team Helena	6	Giannis Kesides	"Teleiosame"	Vaya Zigoyianni	"Os Ki Oi Thalasses"	–	–	—N/a	–
Episode 20 (November 29, 2017)	Team Helena	6	Giannis Kesides	"Teleiosame"	Joe Antonakaki	"An Thimitheis t' Oneiro Mou"	–	–	—N/a	–
Episode 20 (November 29, 2017)	Team Kostis	7	Panos Patayiannis	"Anthem"	Mariam Loria	"Unbreak my Heart"	—N/a	–	–	–
Episode 20 (November 29, 2017)	Team Kostis	7	Panos Patayiannis	"Anthem"	Aggelos Tsimidakis	"Message in a Bottle"	—N/a	–	✔	–
Episode 20 (November 29, 2017)	Team Sakis	8	Dimosthenis Vatistas	"All of Me"	Mara Tzima	"To Miden"	–	—N/a	–	–
Episode 20 (November 29, 2017)	Team Sakis	8	Dimosthenis Vatistas	"All of Me"	Katerina Bourneli	"Ta Leme"	–	—N/a	–	–
Episode 21 (December 3, 2017)	Team Sakis	1	Tzortzina Aleksaki	"Ponemeni Kardia"	Giannis Alexakis	"Xipnisa Pente to Proi"	–	—N/a	–	–
Episode 21 (December 3, 2017)	Team Sakis	1	Tzortzina Aleksaki	"Ponemeni Kardia"	Samir Al-Belati	"Poso Mou Lipi"	–	—N/a	–	–
Episode 21 (December 3, 2017)	Team Panos	2	Alex Hamel	"I've got a Woman"	Ross Hill	"Wrong Side of Heaven"	–	–	–	—N/a
Episode 21 (December 3, 2017)	Team Panos	2	Alex Hamel	"I've got a Woman"	Stelios Ioakeim	"Evolution of the Skid"	–	✔	–	—N/a
Episode 21 (December 3, 2017)	Team Helena	3	Sofia Agnantopoulou	"If I Ain't Got You"	Elena Armao	"Hot Stuff"	–	Team full	—N/a	–
Episode 21 (December 3, 2017)	Team Helena	3	Sofia Agnantopoulou	"If I Ain't Got You"	Eleanna Athanasiou	"If I Were A Boy"	–	Team full	—N/a	–
Episode 21 (December 3, 2017)	Team Kostis	4	Dorida Chioti	"I Sklava"	Tzina Sofaditi	"Roza Rozalia"	—N/a	Team full	–	–
Episode 21 (December 3, 2017)	Team Kostis	4	Dorida Chioti	"I Sklava"	Manolis Souranakis	"Thes"	—N/a	Team full	–	–
Episode 21 (December 3, 2017)	Team Sakis	5	Michaela Theododou	"Dream On"	Christiana Sioka	"My Immortal"	–	Team full	–	–
Episode 21 (December 3, 2017)	Team Sakis	5	Michaela Theododou	"Dream On"	Marina Kyriazopoulou	"Total Eclipse of the Heart"	–	Team full	–	✔
Episode 21 (December 3, 2017)	Team Panos	6	Kostas Bouyiotis	"Canto Della Terra"	Christina Matsa	"One Night Only"	–	Team full	–	—N/a
Episode 21 (December 3, 2017)	Team Panos	6	Kostas Bouyiotis	"Canto Della Terra"	Evita Larkou	"Girl on Fire"	–	Team full	–	—N/a
Episode 21 (December 3, 2017)	Team Helena	7	Haris Kornaros	"Hurt"	Gary Frad	"Bang Bang"	–	Team full	—N/a	–
Episode 21 (December 3, 2017)	Team Helena	7	Haris Kornaros	"Hurt"	Giannis Karatzas	"To Parti"	–	Team full	—N/a	–
Episode 21 (December 3, 2017)	Team Kostis	8	Konstantina Katsoyianni	"Anthropoi Monaxoi"	Mariana Dimousi	"Xariklaki"	—N/a	Team full	–	–
Episode 21 (December 3, 2017)	Team Kostis	8	Konstantina Katsoyianni	"Anthropoi Monaxoi"	Aggelos Alepakis	"Siopi"	—N/a	Team full	–	–
Episode 22 (December 5, 2017)	Team Helena	1	Manos Koukkos	"Edeka Para"	Afroditi Sofianidou	"Oi Amarties Mou"	–	Team full	—N/a	–
Episode 22 (December 5, 2017)	Team Helena	1	Manos Koukkos	"Edeka Para"	Konstantina Karvouniari	"T' Apogeymata t' adia"	–	Team full	—N/a	–
Episode 22 (December 5, 2017)	Team Sakis	2	Dimitris Theodosiadis	"Sign of the Times"	Vasilis Lambropoulos	"Kanenas Tous"	–	Team full	✔	–
Episode 22 (December 5, 2017)	Team Sakis	2	Dimitris Theodosiadis	"Sign of the Times"	Evelina Assantourian	"Chasing Pavements"	–	Team full	–	–
Episode 22 (December 5, 2017)	Team Panos	3	Despina Lemonitsi	"Colors of the Wild"	Elena Kambani	"Someone Like You"	–	Team full	Team full	—N/a
Episode 22 (December 5, 2017)	Team Panos	3	Despina Lemonitsi	"Colors of the Wild"	Chloe Chariri	"Valerie"	–	Team full	Team full	—N/a
Episode 22 (December 5, 2017)	Team Kostis	4	Maria Moskofian	"Ego s' Agapisa Edo"	Konstantinos Kotsadam	"Amara Me"	—N/a	Team full	Team full	✔
Episode 22 (December 5, 2017)	Team Kostis	4	Maria Moskofian	"Ego s' Agapisa Edo"	Omiros Baboukis	"Katse Kala"	—N/a	Team full	Team full	–
Episode 22 (December 5, 2017)	Team Helena	5	Anastasios Papanastasiou	"It's not Unusual"	Korina Ntilenian	"Stop"	–	Team full	Team full	Team full
Episode 22 (December 5, 2017)	Team Helena	5	Anastasios Papanastasiou	"It's not Unusual"	Mary Protopapa	"Piece of my Heart"	✔	Team full	Team full	Team full
Episode 22 (December 5, 2017)	Team Sakis	6	Georgia Pratopoulou	"I Xenitia"	Despina Andreou	"De Thelo"	Team full	Team full	Team full	Team full
Episode 22 (December 5, 2017)	Team Sakis	6	Georgia Pratopoulou	"I Xenitia"	Stavros Tsoukalas	"Pare ta Xnaria mou"	Team full	Team full	Team full	Team full
Episode 22 (December 5, 2017)	Team Panos	7	Ioulia Kalimani	"Kai Xafnika"	Panagiotis Redetakos	"Stin Kardia"	Team full	Team full	Team full	Team full
Episode 22 (December 5, 2017)	Team Panos	7	Ioulia Kalimani	"Kai Xafnika"	Yiannis Bekas	"Spasmena Kommatia tis Kardias"	Team full	Team full	Team full	Team full
Episode 22 (December 5, 2017)	Team Kostis	8	Nikos Floqi	"Enas Xartinos Ilios"	Vasia Kaledjoglou	"Gia Ena Tango"	Team full	Team full	Team full	Team full
Episode 22 (December 5, 2017)	Team Kostis	8	Nikos Floqi	"Enas Xartinos Ilios"	Irene Disiou	"Gia To Kalo Mou"	Team full	Team full	Team full	Team full

== Live shows ==
Color key

Artist was saved by the public's vote
Artist was eliminated by the public's vote
Artist procaimed as the winner
Artist proclaimed as runner-up

=== Week 1 ===
==== Cross Battle 1 (December 6) ====
Duel	Order	Coach	Artist	Song	Public Vote	Result
I	1	Team Helena	Aggelos Tsimidakis	"Perfect"	21%	Eliminated
I	2	Team Kostis	Nikos Floqi	"Dicitencello vuie"	79%	Saved
II	3	Team Kostis	Dorida Chioti	"Akrogialies Dilina"	36%	Eliminated
II	4	Team Panos	Andria Aggeli	"Stand by me"	64%	Saved
III	5	Team Helena	Manos Koukkos	"Tha'thela na soun edo"	30%	Eliminated
III	6	Team Panos	Konstantinos Kotsadam	"Xroma den allazoune ta matia"	70%	Saved
IV	7	Team Helena	Sofia Agnantopoulou	"Don't you worry'bout a thing"	47%	Eliminated
IV	8	Team Sakis	Georgia Pratopoulou	"Ego eimai prosfigaki"	53%	Saved
V	9	Team Panos	Alex Hamel	"The chain"	33%	Eliminated
V	10	Team Sakis	Stelios Psarogianis	"All my love"	67%	Saved
VI	11	Team Panos	Ioulia Kalimani	"Mia pista apo fosforo"	30%	Eliminated
VI	12	Team Kostis	Yiorgos Zioris	"Sou Sfirizo"	70%	Saved
VII	13	Team Sakis	Tzortzina Aleksaki	"Oso varoun ta sidera"	60%	Saved
VII	14	Team Kostis	Mary Protopapa	"The show must go on"	40%	Eliminated
VIII	15	Team Sakis	Michaela Theododou	"Rise like a Phoenix"	47%	Eliminated
VIII	16	Team Helena	Anastasios Papanastasiou	"All by myself"	53%	Saved

==== Cross Battle 2 (December 7) ====
Duel	Order	Coach	Artist	Song	Public Vote	Result
I	1	Team Sakis	Stelios Ioakeim	"Billie Jean"	68%	Saved
I	2	Team Panos	David Kanavos	"Theos an einai"	32%	Eliminated
II	3	Team Sakis	Dimosthenis Vatistas	"Attention"	48%	Eliminated
II	4	Team Helena	Fani Zochiou	"Psixes kai Somata"	52%	Saved
III	5	Team Panos	Despina Lemonitsi	"Univited"	71%	Saved
III	6	Team Helena	Vasilis Lambropoulos	"Where the streets have no name"	29%	Eliminated
IV	7	Team Kostis	Panos Patayiannis	"Thalassa Platia"	40%	Eliminated
IV	8	Team Panos	Marina Kyriazopoulou	"Julia"	60%	Saved
V	9	Team Kostis	Maria Moskofian	"Arnisi"	41%	Eliminated
V	10	Team Sakis	Dimitris Theodosiadis	"Stand by me now"	59%	Saved
VI	11	Team Helena	Giannis Kesides	"Apogeyma Thlimmeno"	30%	Eliminated
VI	12	Team Sakis	Christodoula Tsagara	"Ola ayta pou fovamai"	70%	Saved
VII	13	Team Kostis	Konstantina Katsoyianni	"Ola se thimizoun"	72%	Saved
VII	14	Team Helena	Haris Kornaros	"En Leyko"	28%	Eliminated
VIII	15	Team Panos	Kostas Bouyiotis	"Misirlou"	41%	Eliminated
VIII	16	Team Kostis	Sophia Nassiou	"Cancao do mar"	59%	Saved

=== Week 2 ===
==== Semi-Final 1 (December 13) ====
Order	Coach	Artist	Song	Result
1	Team Sakis	Tzortzina Aleksaki	"Kaigomai kai Sigoliono"	Eliminated
2	Team Kostis	Nikos Floqi	"Irtha ki apopse sta skalopatia sou"	Eliminated
3	Team Panos	Andria Aggeli	"Anathema Se"	Eliminated
4	Team Sakis	Stelios Ioakeim	"In the End"	Saved
5	Team Panos	Konstantinos Kotsadam	"To Feggari Panothe mou"	Eliminated
6	Team Helena	Fani Zochiou	"Istoria Mou"	Saved
7	Team Kostis	Yiorgos Zioris	"Esi eisai h Aitia pou Ipofero"	Saved
8	Team Sakis	Christodoula Tsagara	"Kopse kai Moirase"	Saved

==== Semi-Final 2 (December 14) ====
Order	Coach	Artist	Song	Result
1	Team Sakis	Dimitris Theodosiadis	"Emena Thes"	Saved
2	Team Panos	Despina Lemonitsi	"Mama Gernao"	Saved
3	Team Kostis	Sophia Nassiou	"Mampo Mprazileiro"	Eliminated
4	Team Sakis	Stelios Psarogianis	"Soldier of Fortune"	Eliminated
5	Team Helena	Anastasios Papanastasiou	"New York, New York"	Eliminated
6	Team Panos	Marina Kyriazopoulou	"Gia na se Ekdikitho"	Saved
7	Team Kostis	Konstantina Katsoyianni	"Oles tou Kosmou oi Kiriakes"	Saved
8	Team Sakis	Georgia Pratopoulou	"Milo gia Sena"	Eliminated

=== Week 3 ===
==== Final (December 20) ====
===== Round 1 =====
Order	Coach	Artist	Song	Result
1	Team Sakis	Stelios Ioakeim	"Simple Man"	Saved
2	Team Panos	Despina Lemonitsi	"Augoustos"	Saved
3	Team Kostis	Yiorgos Zioris	"My Way"	Saved
4	Team Sakis	Christodoula Tsagara	"Iparxei Logos"	Saved
5	Team Helena	Fani Zochiou	"Apopse tha 'thela"	Eliminated
6	Team Panos	Marina Kyriazopoulou	"Without You"	Eliminated
7	Team Kostis	Konstantina Katsoyianni	"Ax Ellada"	Eliminated
8	Team Sakis	Dimitris Theodosiadis	"To Kima"	Eliminated

===== Round 2 =====
Order	Coach	Artist	Song	Result
1	Team Sakis	Stelios Ioakeim	"Evolution of the Skid"	Saved
2	Team Panos	Despina Lemonitsi	"Just Hold Me"	Eliminated
3	Team Kostis	Yiorgos Zioris	"That's Life"	Saved
4	Team Sakis	Christodoula Tsagara	"Ta Leme"	Eliminated

===== Round 3 =====
Order	Coach	Artist	Song	Result
1	Team Kostis	Yiorgos Zioris	"Sou Sfirizo"	Winner
2	Team Sakis	Stelios Ioakeim	"Superstition"	Runner-up

== Ratings ==
Episode		Date	Timeslot (EET)	Official ratings (in millions)	Rank		Share		Source
Episode		Date	Timeslot (EET)	Official ratings (in millions)	Daily	Weekly	Household	Adults 15–44	Source
1	"Blind Auditions"	October 3, 2017	Tuesday 9:00pm	0.919	3	18	21.8%	20.6%	
2	"Blind Auditions"	October 4, 2017	Wednesday 9:00pm	0.922	3	17	21.7%	21.3%	
3	"Blind Auditions"	October 5, 2017	Thursday 9:00pm	0.93	4	16	21.9%	18.5%	
4	"Blind Auditions"	October 11, 2017	Wednesday 9:00pm	0.918	3	19	22.4%	21.4%	
5	"Blind Auditions"	October 12, 2017	Thursday 9:00pm	1.026	2	13	25.2%	—N/a	
6	"Blind Auditions"	October 18, 2017	Wednesday 9:00pm	0.93	3	18	21.7%	—N/a	
7	"Blind Auditions"	October 19, 2017	Thursday 9:00pm	1.12	1	6	27.4%	24.2%	
8	"Blind Auditions"	October 25, 2017	Wednesday 9:00pm	1.347	1	1	32.0%	33.5%	
9	"Blind Auditions"	October 26, 2017	Thursday 9:00pm	1.153	1	5	30.6%	27.5%	
10	"Blind Auditions"	November 1, 2017	Wednesday 9:00pm	1.011	4	15	23.0%	26.5%	
11	"Blind Auditions"	November 2, 2017	Thursday 9:00pm	1.173	1	4	28.8%	32.6%	
12	"Blind Auditions"	November 7, 2017	Tuesday 9:00pm	1.075	2	11	27.6%	31%	
13	"Blind Auditions"	November 8, 2017	Wednesday 9:00pm	1.113	3	9	27.3%	30.7%	
14	"Blind Auditions"	November 15, 2017	Wednesday 9:00pm	1.184	2	4	29.9%	32.2%	
15	"Battle Rounds"	November 16, 2017	Thursday 9:00pm	1.359	1	1	34.8%	36.6%	
16	"Battle Rounds"	November 21, 2017	Tuesday 9:00pm	0.977	3	13	24.5%	23.9%	
17	"Battle Rounds"	November 22, 2017	Wednesday 9:00pm	0.828	6	—N/a	19.8%	—N/a	
18	"Battle Rounds"	November 23, 2017	Thursday 9:00pm	1.082	1	6	29.4%	28.7%	
19	"Battle Rounds"	November 28, 2017	Tuesday 9:00pm	0.960	2	12	24.4%	22.8%	
20	"Knockouts"	November 29, 2017	Wednesday 9:00pm	0.959	4	14	23.9%	28.7%	
21	"Knockouts"	December 3, 2017	Sunday 9:00pm	1.158	1	2	30.0%	—N/a	
22	"Knockouts"	December 5, 2017	Tuesday 9:00pm	0.960	3	16	24.7%	24.8%	
23	"Live Shows"	December 6, 2017	Wednesday 9:00pm	0.877	4	19	25.1%	27.6%	
24	"Live Shows"	December 7, 2017	Thursday 9:00pm	0.988	2	13	28.2%	28.6%	
25	"Live Semi-Final"	December 13, 2017	Wednesday 9:00pm	0.982	4	16	24.4%	24.5%	
26	"Live Semi-Final"	December 14, 2017	Thursday 9:00pm	1.033	1	11	26.6%	25.3%	
27	"Live Final"	December 20, 2017	Wednesday 9:00pm	1.306	1	1	35.2%	34.6%	
