= The Voice Kids (Greek TV series) =

Greek TV talent show

- Genre: Talent show
- Created by: John de Mol; Roel van Velzen
- Countries of origin: Greece; Cyprus
- Original language: Greek

Production
- Production locations: Spata, Attica

Original release
- Network: ANT1

Related
- The Voice (franchise); The Voice of Greece

The Voice Kids was a planned Greek and Cypriot television talent show that would premiere during the 2014–2015 season on ANT1. However, the show was canceled. As of 2026, the series has yet to be reconsidered.

== Production ==
In April 2014, during the first season of the original version, it was rumored that ANT1 had decided to start the kid's version after the success of the original version. The show was confirmed for its first season in early May 2014 along with the renewals of The Voice of Greece, Dancing with the Stars and Your Face Sounds Familiar.

=== Scheduling ===
The kid's version of the show was expected to start during the 2014–2015 television season. No dates have been confirmed for the premiere of the show.

The show has finally been canceled.

=== Promotion ===
The show was firstly promoted through the final of the original version, when Giorgos Liagkas revealed that the show would be starting during the next television season. The first trailer of the show premiered on May 12, 2014 and read "if you are 15 years old or younger and want your voice to reach to the top, register for The Voice Kids".

== Presenters and coaches ==
It was rumored that Fay Skorda, wife of the presenter of the first season of the original version, would be presenting the show. When Liagkas was asked if Skorda would be presenter of the show, he said that he hopes so "she joins the family".

Along with Fay as presenter, Demy and Ivi Adamou were speculated as the coaches of the series.
