= The Voice of Greece =

- Genre: Talent show
- Created by: John de Mol; Roel van Velzen
- Directed by: Thanos Gomozias; Kostas Voridis; Kostas Grigorakis; Thanos Kappas
- Presented by: Giorgos Liagkas; Giorgos Kapoutzidis; Giorgos Lianos; Doukissa Nomikou; Fay Skorda; Backstage; Themis Georgantas; Elena Tsagrinou; Laura Narjes; Christina Bompa; Valia Hatzitheodwrou
- Judges: Michalis Kouinelis; Despina Vandi; Antonis Remos; Melina Aslanidou; Helena Paparizou; Sakis Rouvas; Panos Mouzourakis; Kostis Maraveyas; Eleonora Zouganeli; Konstantinos Argyros; Giorgos Mazonakis†; Christos Mastoras; Paola
- Countries of origin: Greece; Cyprus
- Original language: Greek
- No. of seasons: 12

Production
- Executive producers: Anna Aravaniti (1–2); Aggelos Christopoulos (3–)
- Producers: Antonis Matsos (1–2); Tony Kontaxakis (3–6); Giannis Christodoulopoulos (7–)
- Production locations: Spata, Attica (1–2); Galatsi, Attica (3–)
- Running time: 120–240 minutes
- Production companies: Talpa (1–6); ITV Studios (6–); Acun Medya (3–)

Original release
- Network: ANT1
- Release: 10 January 2014 – 21 June 2015
- Network: Skai TV; Sigma TV
- Release: 16 November 2016 – present

Related
- The Voice (franchise); The Voice Kids

The Voice of Greece is a Greek television talent show created by John de Mol and based on the concept The Voice of Holland. It is part of an international series. It began airing on ANT1 on January 10, 2014, and the final of second season on June 21, 2015. The third season premiered on November 16, 2016, on Skai TV. It also premiered the same day in Cyprus on Sigma TV.

There are four different stages to the show: producers' auditions, blind auditions, battle phase and live shows. Producers' auditions take place in Athens and Thessaloniki in Greece and in Nicosia in Cyprus. The following stages take place in the Kapa Studios, in Spata, Attica. Since the third season, there were five different stages on the show: Producers' Auditions, Blind Auditions, Battle Rounds, Knockouts, and Live Shows. Season Five introduced a new stage: Playoffs. Producers' auditions take place in Athens and Thessaloniki in Greece, and in Nicosia in Cyprus. The following stages take place in the Galatsi Olympic Hall, in Galatsi, Athens, Greece.

Maria Elena Kiriakou, Kostas Ageris, Giannis Margaris, Yiorgos Zioris, Lemonia Beza, Dimitris Karagiannis, Ioanna Georgakopoulou, Anna Argyrou, Maria Sakellari, Sofia Chistoforidou, and Konstantinos Komodromos are currently the eleven winners produced by the series. The show was renewed for a second season on ANT1 TV that premiered during the 2014–2015 season along with a kids version of the show, which was later cancelled.

== Production ==
The Voice of Greece was often mentioned in July–August 2013 by the media as the new reality show on the Greek television. Even though no broadcaster had officially announced the show, ANT1 and Mega Channel were the possible channels that would host the show. In early September it was announced with a trailer that ANT1 bought the rights for the show. It was revealed the show would be going head-to-head with Mega Channel's series, Klemmena Onira, which was very successful.

Although it was not done for every performance of the contestants, the four original songs of the four finalists were released through iTunes.

Devised by John de Mol, the creator of Big Brother, The Voice is based on the Dutch TV programme The Voice of Holland and is part of The Voice franchise, being based on the similar British and American format. After securing the show, ANT1 had in their schedule three of the top shows: The Voice, Dancing with the Stars and Your Face Sounds Familiar with all of them being renewed for the 2014−2015 season.

=== Scheduling ===
After speculation in August, the show was expected to start in November 2013. In September, it was speculated that the new series To Spiti tis Emmas starring Katia Dandoulaki, also set to premiere in November 2013. The show's air date was officially confirmed on December 21, 2013, with a trailer. A countdown started on the show's Twitter on 3 January 2014. It was rumored that the Cypriot channel, Mega Channel would start a show alike to The Voice and the Greek same-titled channel would broadcast it opposite The Voice. The show was later officially confirmed by the broadcaster with a trailer. The show started after the third season of DanSing for You was finished. It was rumored that Zeta Makripoulia, who hosted Dancing with the Stars on ANT1, would host the show. However, it was later confirmed that Makripoulia would be hosting the second season of Mega's reality singing contest, Just the 2 of Us.

As more episodes of the show were broadcast, the more audience were following it, making ANT1 more successful. The show was broadcast opposite Mega's popular series, Klemmena Onira which was broadcast from 9:15 to 10:00. On January 10, 2014, it managed to get more viewers than Mega's series, with 1.78 million viewers for the show's premiere and left the series behind with 1.70 million viewers. However, the "war" between the two was tight in the next weeks with The Voice of Greece getting the lead only once, on January 24, 2014, with 1.734 million viewers, almost 1 million viewers more than the series.

The Voice of Greece was not broadcast the same day in ANT1 Cyprus. In Cyprus the blind auditions and the battles were broadcast one day later than in Greece; on Saturday at 9:15. However, as the live shows were broadcast live, the show was moved to Fridays as in the Greek channel.

In February 2014, it was rumored that the air date would change to Sunday with the producers of the show denying the rumor and said that the rest of the blind auditions and the battles will be aired on Fridays as they are recorded. However, they have said that the day of the live shows isn't decided yet as two of the coaches can't be on the show on Fridays due to their schedule. After the battles were completed, it was shown on the trailer for the live shows that they would be airing on Fridays, as the previous stages.

A month after the premiere of the 1st show, Mega Channel Cyprus announced the premiere of their talent show, Your Song, that was rumored to be broadcast in the Greek channel also, opposite The Voice of Greece. Even though the show was not broadcast by the Greek channel, in March 2014 the broadcaster confirmed the second season of the reality singing competition Just the 2 of Us hosted by Zeta Makripoulia who hosted the first to third seasons of Dancing with the Stars.

=== Promotion ===
The first promotional item for the show was on the TV, with a trailer announcing the auditions of the show in September 2013. It read, "The first show that close the eyes to the appearance and listens only the voice". Several shots from American version were shown during the trailer. Four twenty-seconds trailers were shown three months later, on 12 December. The official trailer with the premiere date was shown on December 21, 2013. The coaches, who were first seen in that trailer, were coming from the backstage to the stage. As it was done in the American version, a bus showing the coaches of the show as well as the show's logo and premiere date, was travelling around the country in order to promote the show.

==== Social media ====
During the live shows, the V Reporter usually shows reports on the trending of the show in the social media such as Twitter, Facebook and YouTube. The hashtag #thevoicegr is used for the show as well as hashtags with the teams.

=== Auditions and filming ===
The producer auditions of the first season started in September 2013. The blind auditions took place in the Kapa Studios in Spata, Attica, where the battle and live shows also take place with the only difference being that the latter is broadcast live and it is not recorded. The places of the audition were not officially announced but Thessaloniki, Athens and Nicosia were some of the cities. Though the blind auditions were not filmed in one day, the coaches wore the same clothes in all the episodes of the blind auditions as it is a rule of the show.

=== Incidents ===
On January 25, 2014, it was announced that the production of the original show sued Stamatina Kanta, a contestant of the first season, after breaching the conditions of the contract. Kanta had appeared in a talk show that didn't belong to the channel that broadcasts the show. A few hours later though, it was revealed that the production team didn't sue the contestant, but had simply phoned with a warning.

== Format ==
The Voice is a reality television series that features four coaches looking for a talented new artist, who could become a global superstar. As the title indicates the coaches judge their vocal ability and not their looks, personalities or stage presence. This aspect, differentiates The Voice from other reality television series such as The X Factor, Greek Idol and Greece's Got Talent. The top sixty four artists are split into four teams and are mentored by the four coaches who in turn choose songs for their artists to perform.

Anyone can audition for the show, even artists that have been in the musical industry. After the auditions are held, the blind auditions take place where the coaches determine the top sixty four. During the blind auditions the artists perform with the coaches facing the audience. If the coach likes the artist vocally and hits the button showing that would like to mentor them. If more than one does so, then the artist selects a coach. However, if no coach turns around then the artist is sent home.

There are four different stages: producers' auditions, Blind auditions, Battle phase and live shows.

=== Selection process ===
The first stage of the show is not broadcast. The producers of the show audition all the artists that submitted their selves through the form on the website. The selected by the producers artists proceed to the blind auditions where they have to perform for the coaches. However, what differs from the other reality shows and as the stage's name indicates, the coaches do not see the artist performing as they face the audience. If the coaches like the performance, they hit their button which shows that they want to mentor the act. If more than one hits the button, the singer has the opportunity to select the coach of his preference. If only one hits the button, the singer is defaulted to his team. However, if none of the coaches hit the button, the artist is eliminated. Since season 5, a new twist called "Block" is featured, which allows one coach to block another coach from getting a contestant. While the singer is performing at the blind auditions, his relatives or friends are at a room, known as the "family room" where they watch him performing. Along with the relatives and friends the host is with them. Each coach has a team of sixteen acts selected from the blind auditions and as soon as they have their sixteen acts, they cannot press their button. Sixty four out of the selected by the producers proceed to the next stage, the battle phase.

The second stage, the Battle phase, is where two artists are mentored and then developed by their respective coach. The coaches of the team will "dedicate themselves to developing their artists, giving them advice, and sharing the secrets of their success in the music industry". The two members of each team are fighting against by performing the same song which is selected by their coach. The coach then, decides who will continue to the show and proceed to the live shows. The "steal" twist was not introduced to the show as in British and American shows. This stage, as the blind auditions, is not live. During the battle phase, the coaches "hire" advisors to help them and give them advice on pairing the contestants and choosing the songs. The advisors of the coaches are known and acclaimed musicians.

The final stage of the show is the live shows. The artists perform in front of the coaches and an audience. Unlike the previous stages, the live shows are broadcast live. Each coach will have eight acts after eight of their sixteen acts have been eliminated in the battle phase. The thirty-two acts compete in the first and second live shows where four acts from each team are eliminated. Each coach has then four acts in the third live and since then each team loses one act in each live until the sixth and final live show where each coach has one act. As it was revealed by the presenter of the first season, during the semi-final week songs are being written and produced for each one of the eight semi-finalists. However, the songs will be used for the final indicating that only four of the songs will be presented by the contestants.

=== Voting system ===
As all the music competitions in Greece, the fans could vote through phone calls or text as well as voting through the website of the broadcaster. The viewers from the rest of the world, except Cyprus, were only able to vote through the website. The voting is unlimited; the viewers can vote as many times as they want.

As of the first season, the voting is only available in the final stage of the show; the live shows. Along with the coaches, the viewers decide who will proceed to the next live show. The voting in each live show was divided in four parts; the acts from each team were performing and the viewer were voting one or more acts from the team. In the first and second live shows, the most voted act was through the third live while the coach had to select a second act to send through. The same process was done in all the live shows except the final live show. However, from the third to the fifth live show, only one act was eliminated from the competition. For the semi-final there was an additional voting system; the coaches had 100 points to give to the two acts of their team and they could not give equal points to the acts. After the semi-final results, the voting for the final started and stayed open for one week. Also, as it was done in American version, voting was also available through iTunes, by purchasing the songs of the four finalists.

As the series is broadcast in Cyprus and Cypriot singers are also competing, Cyprus is also allowed to vote. However, the fact that Cypriot contestants managed to get through the contest, which assumed that Cypriots were voting mostly for Cypriots, caused "feuds" between Greeks and Cypriots mainly through the social network. Also, Evridiki replied to those who criticize the Cypriot contestants; "[...] Don't forget that it's a game. Some people should cool off and don't get upset with the Cypriots that are voting. At the end they are not voting random contestants, but contestants that are objectively good singers".

=== Line-up of coaches ===
Coaches' line-up by chairs order
Season	Year	Coaches			
Season	Year	1	2	3	4
1	2014	Melina	Antonis	Despina	Michalis
2	2015	Melina	Antonis	Despina	Michalis
3	2016-2017	Panos	Helena	Sakis	Kostis
4	2017	Panos	Helena	Sakis	Kostis
5	2018	Panos	Helena	Sakis	Kostis
6	2019	Panos	Helena	Sakis	Eleonora
7	2020-2021	Panos	Helena	Sakis	Eleonora
8	2021	Panos	Helena	Sakis	Konstantinos
9	2022-2023	Panos	Helena	Sakis	Konstantinos
10	2024-2025	Panos	Christos	Helena	Giorgos
11	2026	Panos	Christos	Helena	Giorgos
12	2026-2027	Panos	Christos	Helena	Paola

== Series overview ==
Warning: the following table presents a significant amount of different colors.

Teams color key
Artist from Team Despina	Artist from Team Kostis	Artist from Team Helena
Artist from Team Michalis	Artist from Team Sakis	Artist from Team Konstantinos
Artist from Team Antonis	Artist from Team Panos	Artist from Team Giorgos
Artist from Team Melina	Artist from Team Eleonora	Artist from Team Christos

The Voice of Greece series overview
Season	Aired	Winner	Runner-Up	Third Place	Fourth Place	Winning coach	Host(s)
1	2014	Maria Elena Kyriakou	Areti Kosmidou	Lefteris Kintatos	Emily Charalambous	Despina Vandi	Giorgos Liagkas
2	2015	Kostas Ageris	Anna Vilanidi	Nektarios Mallas	Katerina Kabanelli	Antonis Remos	Giorgos Liagkas
3	2016-2017	Giannis Margaris	Kassiani Leipsaki	Nikoleta Milioni	Christos Theodorou	Kostis Maraveyas	Giorgos Kapoutzidis
4	2017	Yiorgos Zioris	Stelios Ioakeim	Christodoula Tsagara	Despina Lemonitsi	Kostis Maraveyas	Giorgos Kapoutzidis
5	2018	Lemonia Beza	Marina Jungwirth	Maria Ieronimaki	Louis Panagiotou	Kostis Maraveyas	Giorgos Kapoutzidis
6	2019	Dimitris Karagiannis	Elpida Gad	Kostas Cheilas	Giorgos Efthimiadis	Sakis Rouvas	Giorgos Lianos
7	2020-2021	Ioanna Georgakopoulou	Alexandra Sieti	Irene Perikleous	Nikos Dalakas	Helena Paparizou	Giorgos Lianos
8	2021	Anna Argyrou	Andreas Miliotis	Eliana Alexandrou	Eleni Olympiou	Sakis Rouvas	Giorgos Lianos
9	2022-2023	Maria Sakellari	Dodona	Lambros Tsiapoutas	Moses Papamoyseos	Panos Mouzourakis	Giorgos Lianos
10	2024-2025	Sofia Chistoforidou	Vagelis Zoulas	Telemachos Avrantas	Panos Katsieris	Panos Mouzourakis	Giorgos Kapoutzidis
11	2025	Konstantinos Komodromos	Christodoulos Mylonas	Maria Vardaki	Vaggos Danezis	Helena Paparizou	Giorgos Kapoutzidis
12	2026-2027	Current Season					Giorgos Lianos

=== Season 1 (2014) ===
The first season of The Voice of Greece premiered on January 10, 2014 (and January 11, 2014, in Cyprus) and concluded on May 8, 2014. Auditions for the season were held in Thessaloniki, Athens (Greece) and Nicosia (Cyprus). The show was broadcast on ANT1 and it was since the first episode a success with rates getting over 50% in household rating.

Four contestants, one from each team, advanced to the final live show. Each one of the four finalists had their own song written by members of the Universal Music Group. Kiriakou from Team Despina was announced as the winner of the season, while Kosmidou was declared as the runner-up. Third and fourth places were Kintatos and Charalambous.

=== Season 2 (2015) ===
The second season of The Voice of Greece premiered on February 15, 2015, and concluded on June 21, 2015.

Four contestants, one from each team, advanced to the final live show. Each one of the four finalists had their own song written by members of the Universal Music Group. Ageris from Team Antonis was announced as the winner of the season, while Vilanidi was declared as the runner-up. Third and fourth places were Mallas and Kabanelli.

=== Season 3 (2016–17) ===
The third season of The Voice of Greece premiered on November 16, 2016, and concluded on March 2, 2017, on Skai TV (Greece) and Sigma TV (Cyprus). It was originally to be aired on Star Channel.

Eight contestants, four from Maraveyas team and two from Mouzourakis and Rouvas team, advanced to the final live show. Margaris from Team Kostis was announced as the winner of the season, while Leipsaki was declared as the runner-up. Third and fourth places were Theodorou and Milioni.

=== Season 4 (2017) ===
The fourth season of The Voice of Greece premiered on October 3, 2017, and concluded on December 20, 2017, on Skai TV (Greece) and Sigma TV (Cyprus).

Eight contestants, three from Rouvas team, two from Mouzourakis and Maraveyas team and one from Paparizou team, advanced to the final live show. Zioris from Team Kostis was announced as the winner of the season, while Ioakeim was declared as the runner-up. Third and fourth places were Lemonitsi and Tsagara.

=== Season 5 (2018) ===
The fifth season of The Voice of Greece premiered on October 2, 2018, and concluded on December 20, 2018.

Eight contestants, three from Paparizou team, two from Rouvas and Maraveyas team and one from Mouzourakis team, advanced to the final live show. Beza from Team Kostis was announced as the winner of the season, while Jungwirth was declared as the runner-up. Third and fourth places were Panagiotou and Ieronimaki.

=== Season 6 (2019) ===
The sixth season of The Voice of Greece premiered on September 27, 2019, and concluded on December 22, 2019.

Eight contestants, three from Rouvas team, two from Paparizou and Zouganeli team and one from Mouzourakis team, advanced to the live final. Dimitris Karagiannis from Team Sakis was announced as the winner of the season, while Elpida Gad was declared as the runner-up. In the third place were Giorgos Efthimiadis and Kostas Cheilas.

=== Season 7 (2020–21) ===
The seventh season of The Voice of Greece premiered on September 13, 2020, and concluded on February 12, 2021.

Nine contestants, three from Paparizou team, two from Rouvas, Mouzourakis and Zouganeli teams, advanced to the live final. Ioanna Georgakopoulou from Team Helena was announced as the winner of the season, while Alexandra Sieti was declared as the runner-up. In the third place were Irene Perikleous and Nikos Dalakas.

=== Season 8 (2021) ===
The eighth season of The Voice of Greece premiered on September 18, 2021, and concluded on December 19, 2021.

Anna Argyrou from Team Sakis won the season, Andreas Miliotis finished as runner-up and Eliana Alexandrou placed third.

=== Season 9 (2022–2023) ===
The ninth season of The Voice of Greece premiered on October 2, 2022 with all four judges from the previous season returning.

The live cross battles were hosted by Fay Skorda.

Maria Sakellari from Team Panos won the season, Dodona finished as runner-up, and Lambros Tsiapoutas and Moses Papamoyseos finished third.

=== Season 10 (2024–2025) ===
The tenth season of The Voice of Greece premiered on October 12, 2024. Helena Paparizou and Panos Mouzourakis returned as coaches, while Sakis Rouvas and Konstantinos Argyros left the show. They were replaced by Giorgos Mazonakis and Christos Mastoras.

Sofia Chistoforidou from Team Panos won the season, Vagelis Zoulas finished as runner-up, and Telemachos Avrantas and Panos Katsieris finished third.

=== Season 11 (2025) ===
The eleventh season of The Voice of Greece premiered on September 27, 2025. Helena Paparizou, Panos Mouzourakis, Giorgos Mazonakis, and Christos Mastoras all returned as coaches.

Konstantinos Komodromos from Team Helena won the season, Christodoulos Mylonas finished as runner-up, and Maria Vardaki and Vaggos Danezis finished third.

=== Season 12 (2026–2027) ===
The twelfth season of The Voice of Greece premiered on October 10, 2026. Helena Paparizou, Panos Mouzourakis, Giorgos Mazonakis, and Christos Mastoras were all originally slated to return as coaches. However, Giorgos Mazonakis passed away unexpectedly of a heart attack on September 9, 2026. He was replaced by Paola.

== Coaches and hosts ==
=== Coaches ===
Coach	Seasons											
Coach	1	2	3	4	5	6	7	8	9	10	11	12
Despina Vandi												
Antonis Remos												
Melina Aslanidou												
Michalis Kouinelis												
Helena Paparizou												
Panos Mouzourakis												
Sakis Rouvas												
Kostis Maraveyas												
Eleonora Zouganeli												
Konstantinos Argyros												
Giorgos Mazonakis												
Christos Mastoras												
Paola												

Coaches

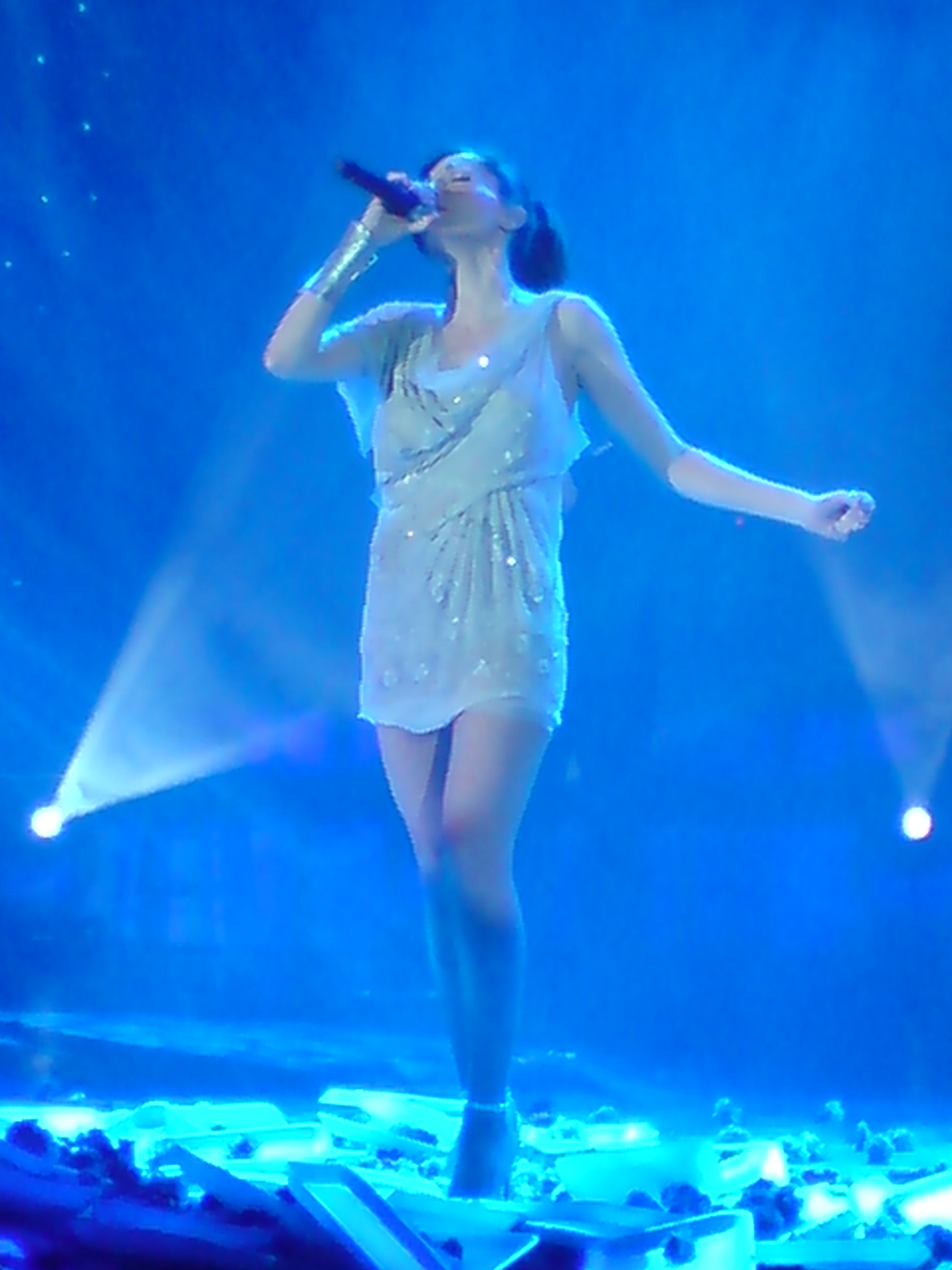
Despina Vandi (2014–2015)

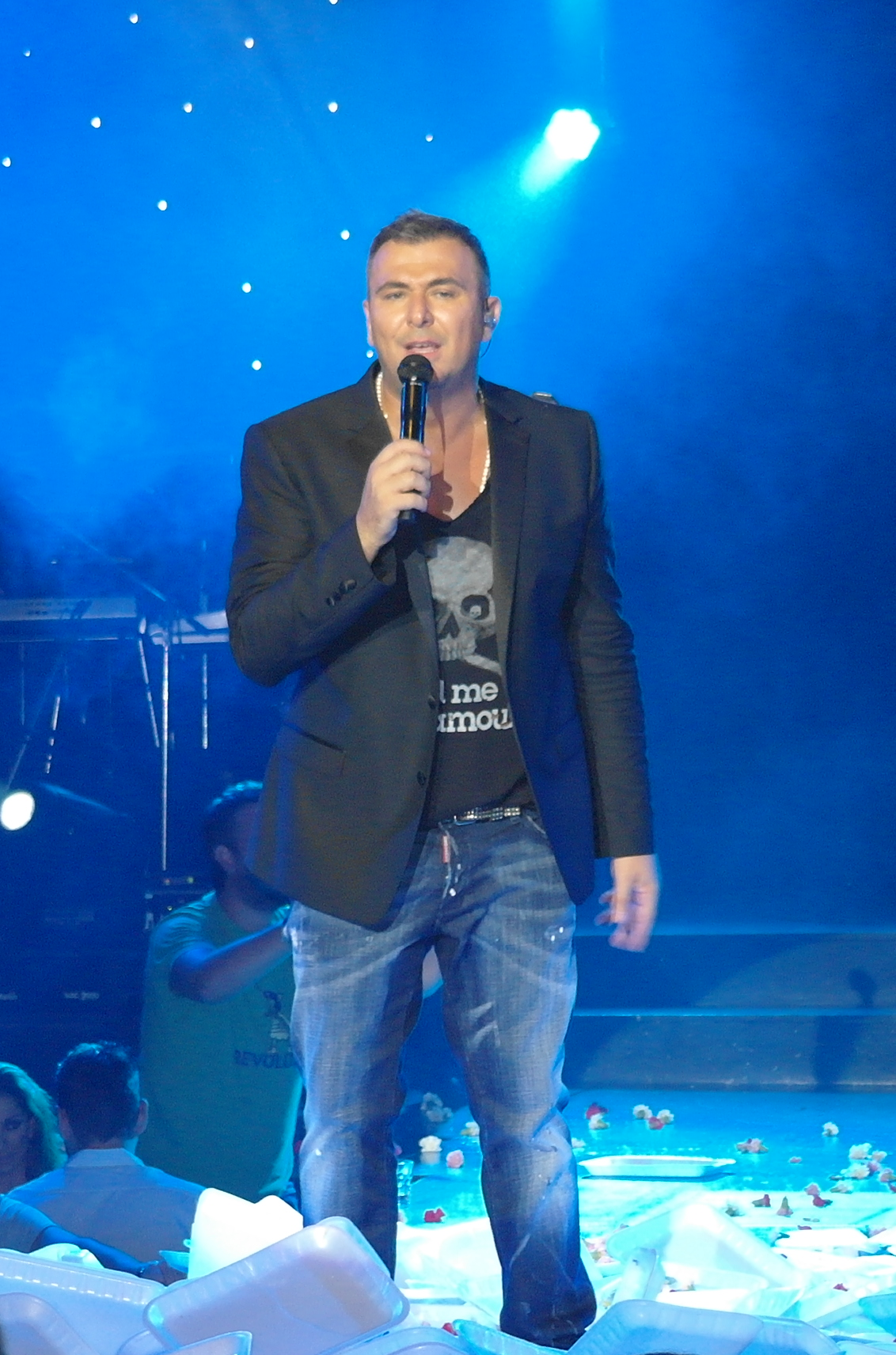
Antonis Remos (2014–2015)

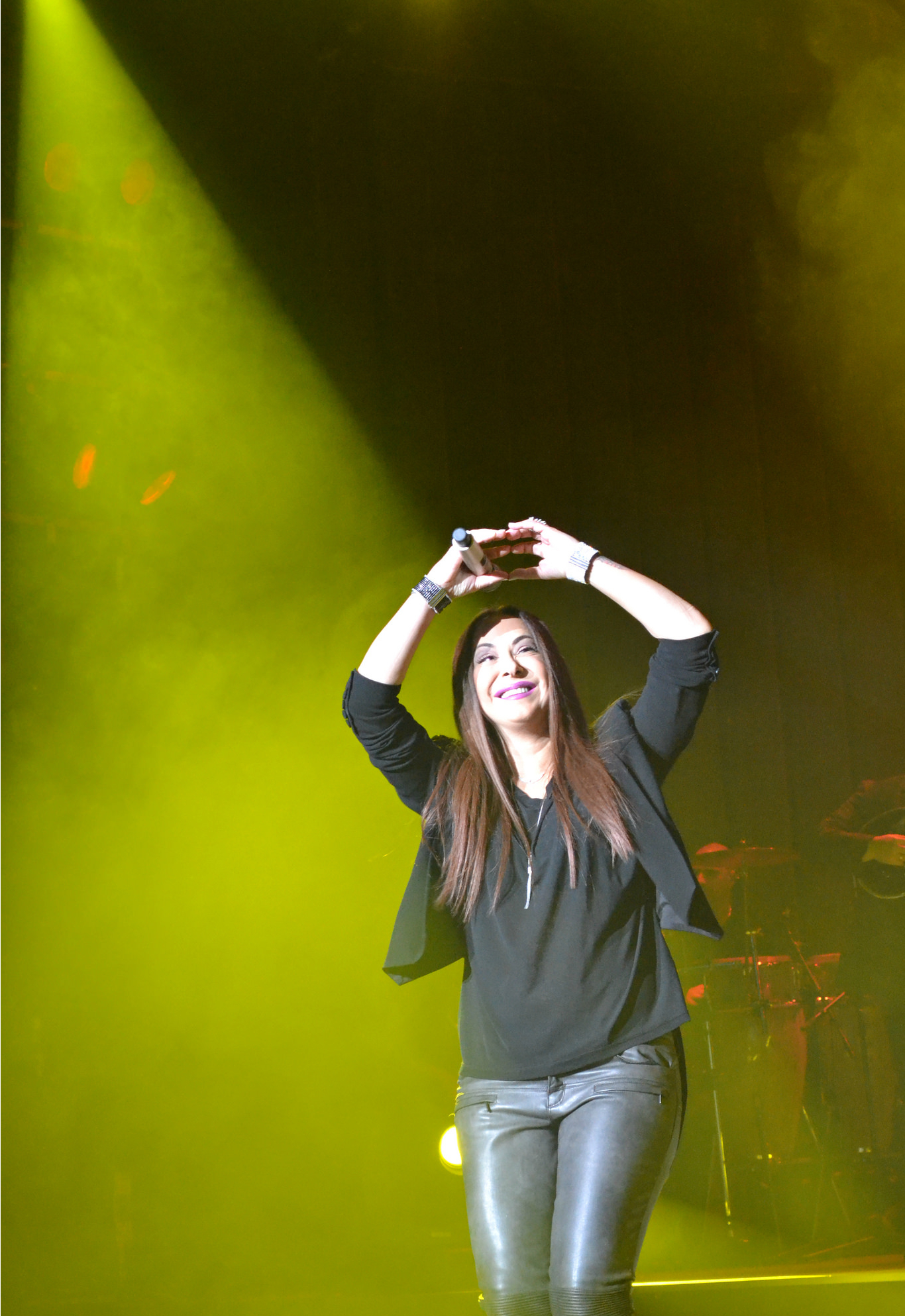
Melina Aslanidou (2014–2015)

Michalis Kouinelis (2014–2015)

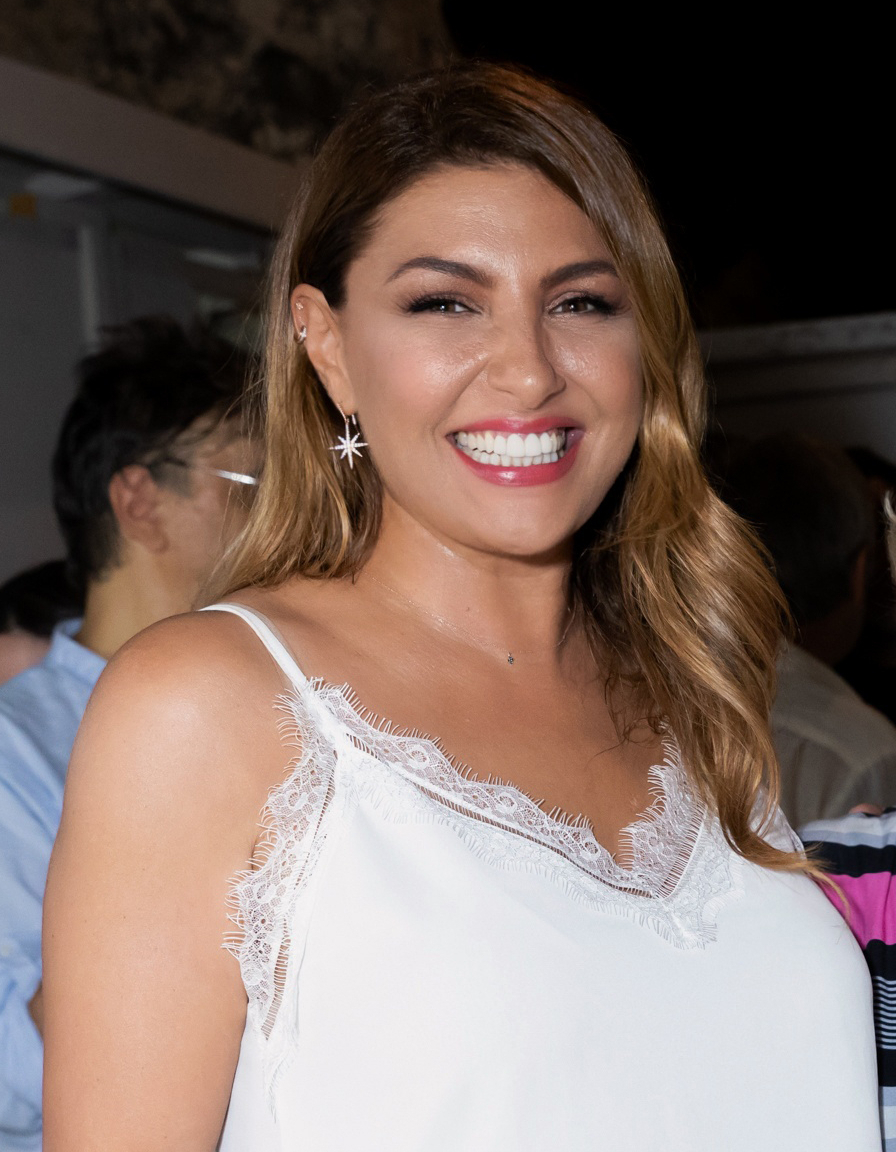
Helena Paparizou (2016–present)

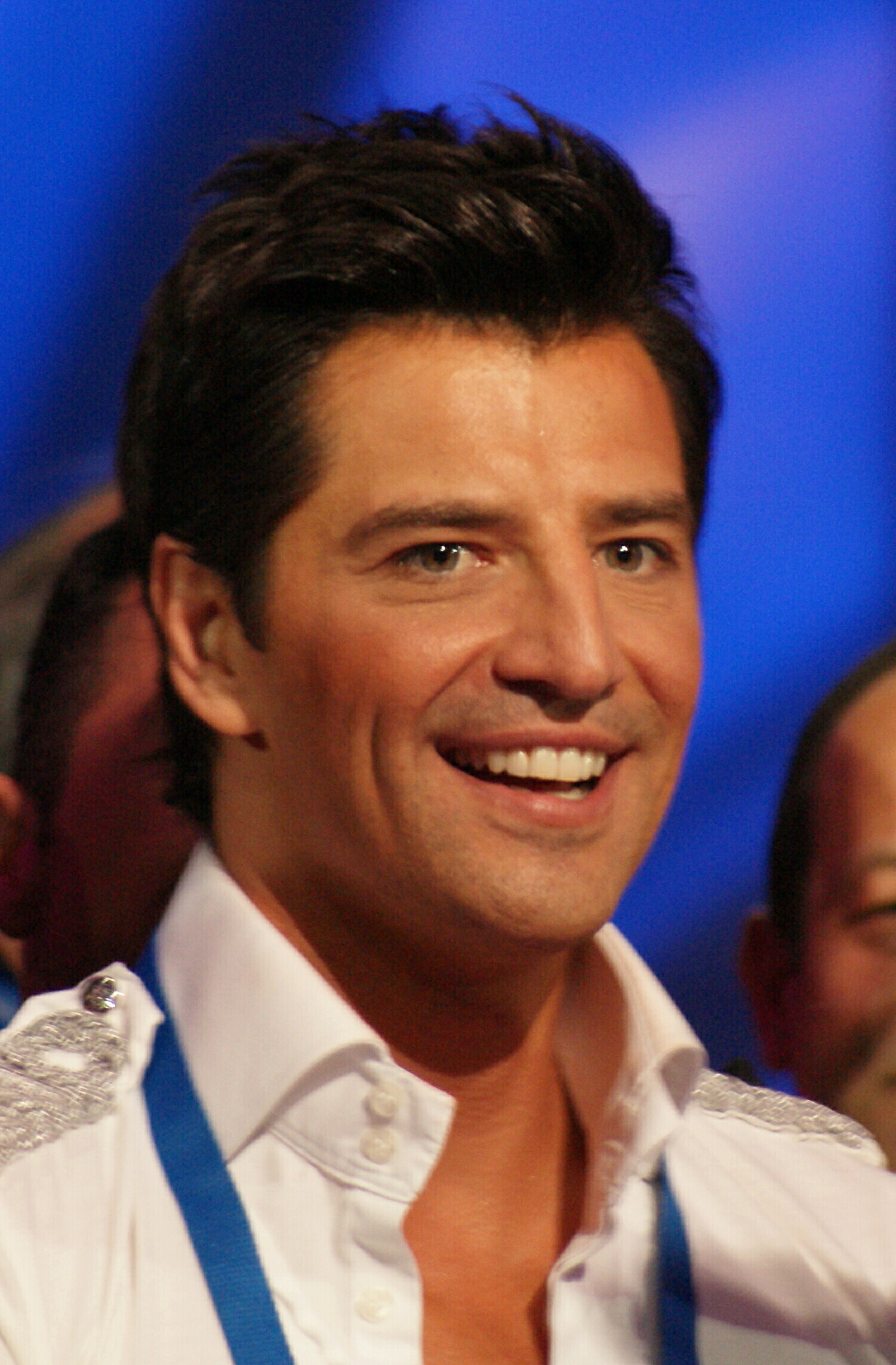
Sakis Rouvas (2016–2023)

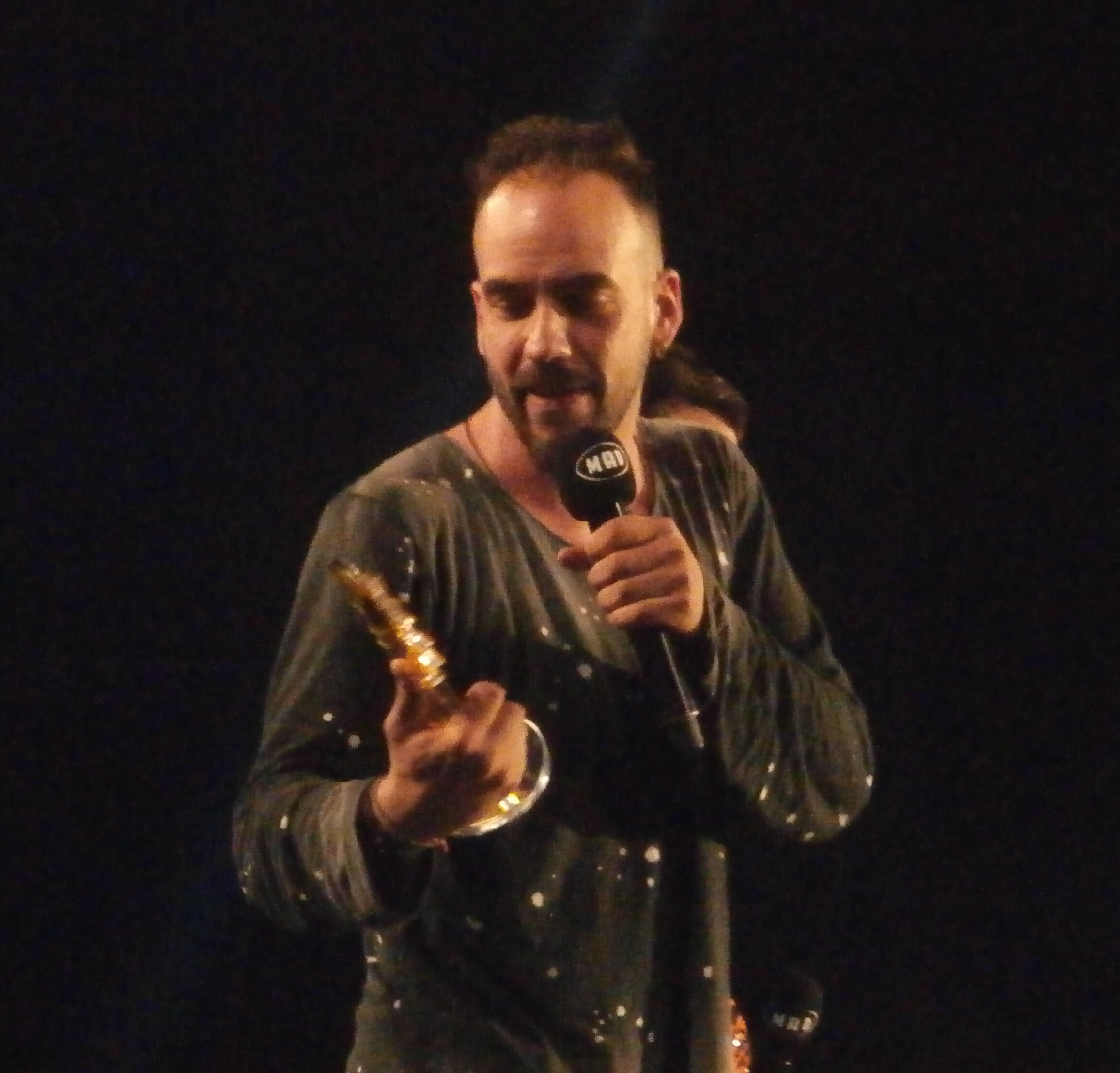
Panos Mouzourakis (2016–present)

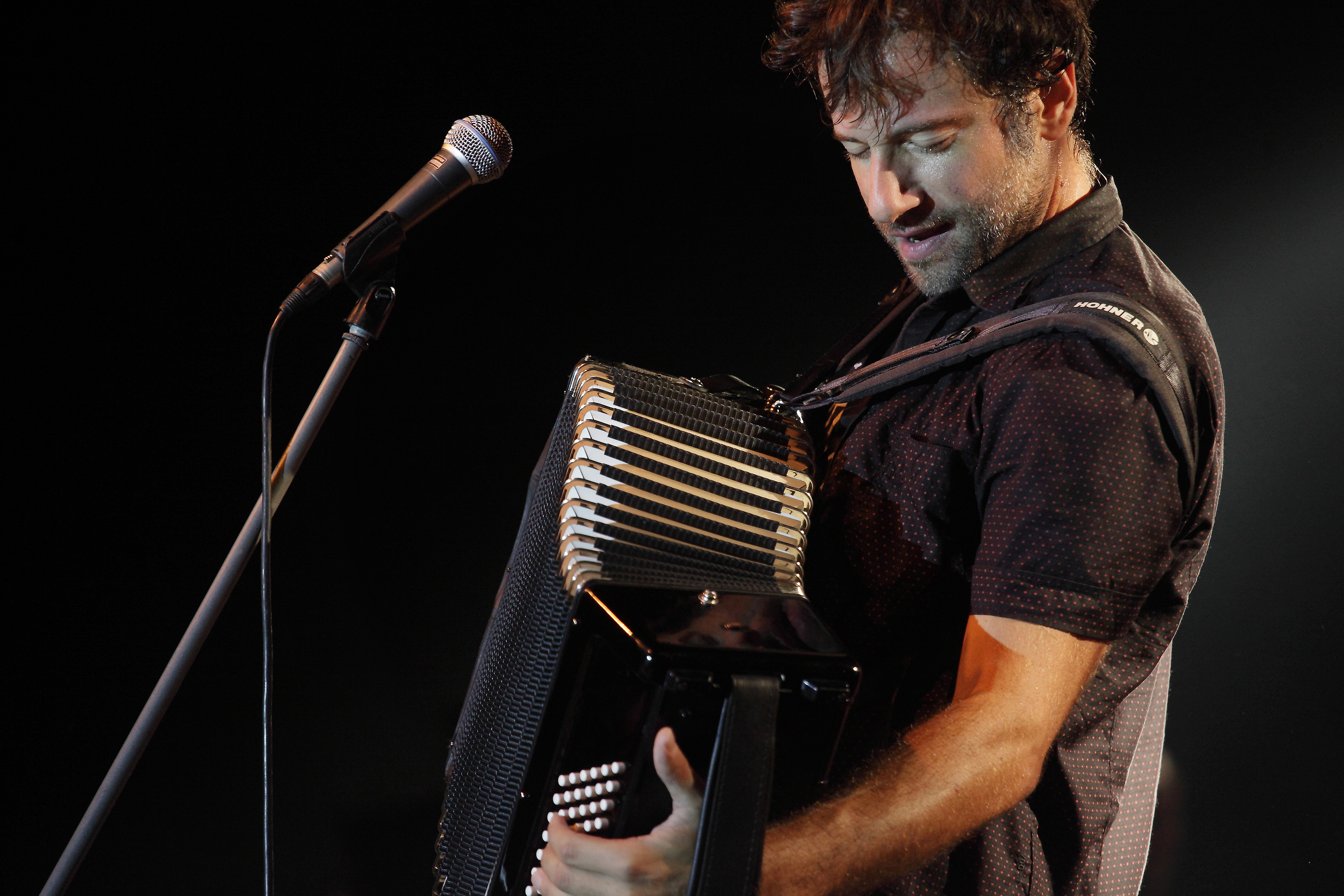
Kostis Maraveyas (2016–2018)

Eleonora Zouganeli (2019–2021)

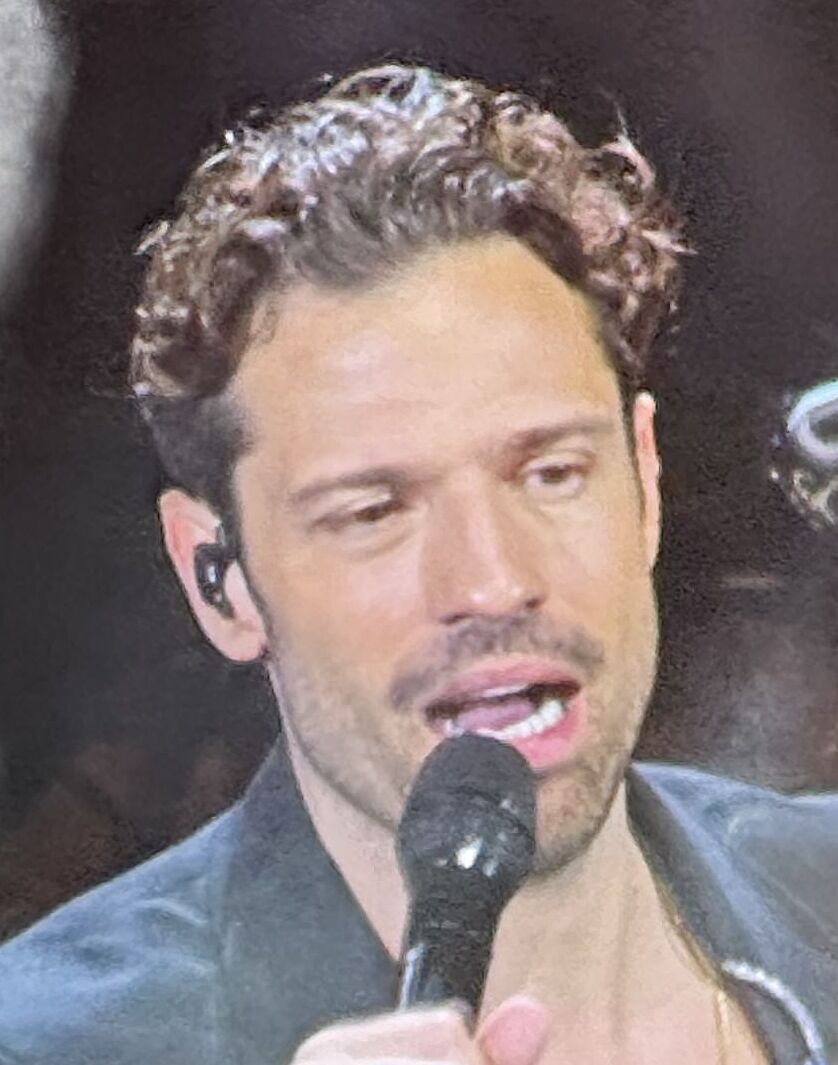
Konstantinos Argyros (2021–2023)

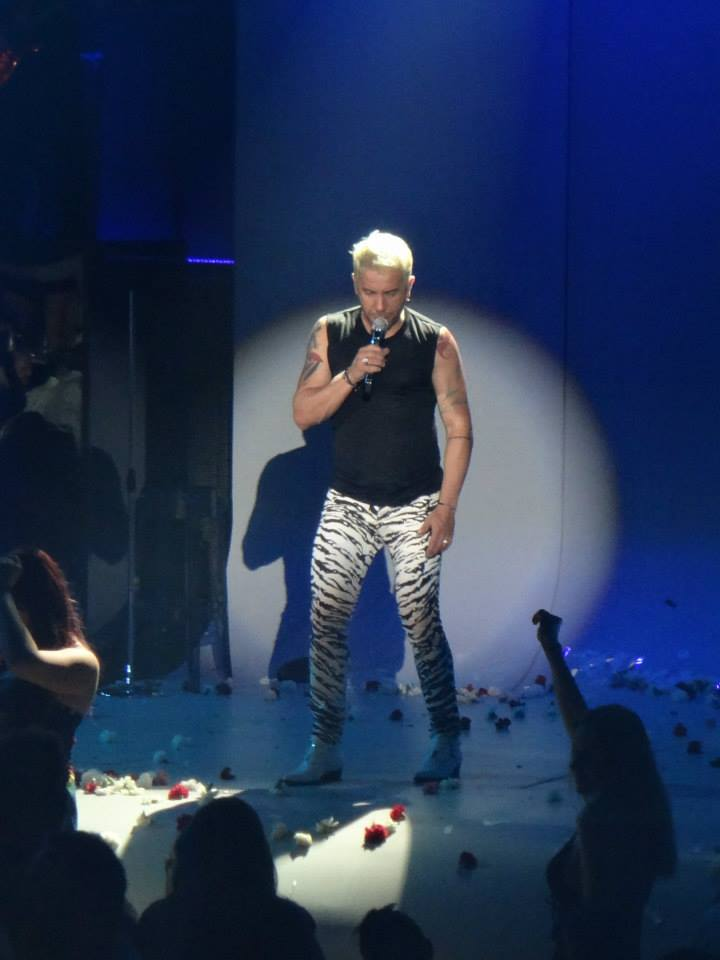
Giorgos Mazonakis† (2024–2025)

Christos Mastoras (2024–present)

Paola (2026–present)

=== Hosts ===
==== Key ====
Main presenter
Backstage presenter

Host	Seasons											
Host	1	2	3	4	5	6	7	8	9	10	11	12
Giorgos Liagkas												
Giorgos Kapoutzidis												
Giorgos Lianos												
Doukissa Nomikou												
Fay Skorda												
Themis Georgantas												
Elena Tsagrinou												
Laura Narjes												
Christina Bompa												
Valia Hatzitheodorou												

== Coaches' teams ==
In each season, each coach chooses a number of acts to get through to the live finals. This table shows, for each season, which artists he or she put through to the live finals.

Key:

– Winning coach and their team. Winners are in bold, finalists are in italic, and eliminated artists are in smaller font.

Season	Michalis Kouinelis	Despina Vandi	Antonis Remos	Melina Aslanidou
One	Areti Kosmidou; Aris Kambanos; Dimitra Dimitrakopoulou; Panayiotis Vintzilaios; Steven Anderito; Tasos Panagiotopoulos; Violeta Christina Dagkalou; Uri Melikov	**Maria Elena Kyriakou**; Dimitris Fournarakis; Eleni Geragidi; Elpida Papakosma; Katerina Lioliou; Nikos Mpaliakos; Stelios Mayalios; Vasilis Axiotis	Lefteris Kintatos; Alex Economou; Dimitris Tiktopoulos; Dimos Mpeke; Evelina Nikoliza; Fani Tselepi; Georgina Karachaliou; Natasa Veneti	Emily Charalambous; Aggeliki Zika; Anna Maria Bilida; Eirini Kalamaraki; Ifigenia Atkinson; Irwan Easty; Mary Doutsi; Vasilis Chatzipartalis
Two	Katerina Kabanelli; Akis Panagiotidis; Eva Tsachra; Elena Papapanagiotou; Petros Panagoulias; Andromachi Dimitropoulou; Polykseni Lykoudi; Andreas Moyseos; Andreas Fox; Giorgos Dimitropoulos	Anna Vilanidi; Stavros Chaliabalias; Panagiota Kapsali; Dimitris Liolios; Oleg Dergatsiov; Andromachi Koktsidi; Babis Nikolatos; Mario Likafi; Angel Karatsami; Emily Makis	**Kostas Ageris**; Konstantinos Aggelopoulos; Makis Drakos; Stelios Karipidis; Maria Ioannidou; Callia Gelagoti; Alexis Prevenas; Stavros Pilichos; Tasos Vermis; Ilektra Barakos	Nektarios Mallas; Andreas Elesnitsalis; Alexandros Barboutis; Despina Zacharitsef; Patricia Abrahams; Kyriaki Pantelidou; Katerina Eugenikou; Dafni Tsoulia; Anastasia Kakagianni; Charianna Meremeti
Three	Kostis Maraveyas	Sakis Rouvas	Helena Paparizou	Panos Mouzourakis
Three	**Giannis Margaris**; Kassiani Leipsaki; Nikoleta Milioni; Akis Kakagis; Magda Theosidou; Tony Vlachos; Chrisa Chrisou	Christos Theodorou; Giorgos Karelis; Panagiotis Chatzipapas; Xenofon Douloumakis; Giorgos Kydonakis; Despina Tata; Andreas Stergiopoulos; Elena Artenian	Kyriaki Kotsiambasi; Elpida Pramas; Vaggelis Tsaknakis; Mike Araitzoglou; Paris Planets; Eleftheria Papamichael; Mary Mitroulia; Dionas Koumbouras	Allan Paul; Giannis Pantelaios; Kelly Ntoulia; Billie Isak; Myrto Naoum; Paschalis Bousdros; Konstantina Zomenou; Faith Erhe
Four	**Yiorgos Zioris**; Konstantina Katsoyianni; Sophia Nassiou; Nikos Floqi; Maria Moskofian; Panos Patayiannis; Mary Protopapa; Dorida Chioti	Stelios Ioakeim; Christodoula Tsagara; Dimitris Theodosiadis; Georgia Pratopoulou; Stelios Psarogianis; Tzortzina Aleksaki; Dimosthenis Vatistas; Michaela Theododou	Fani Zochiou; Anastasios Papanastasiou; Haris Kornaros; Giannis Kesides; Vasilis Lambropoulos; Sofia Agnantopoulou; Manos Koukkos; Aggelos Tsimidakis	Despina Lemonitsi; Marina Kyriazopoulou; Konstantinos Kotsadam; Andria Aggeli; Kostas Bouyiotis; David Kanavos; Ioulia Kalimani; Alex Hamel
Five	**Lemonia Beza**; Maria Ieronimaki; Giannis Panouklias; Theano Sakalidou; Marios Kapilidis; Maria Vasilopoulou; Giannis Adamopoulos; Rachel Cassar; Iro Zervoudi	Marina Jungwirth; Louis Panagiotou; Nasos Angeletos; Dimitra Theofanidi; Eirini Kalamaraki; Panagiotis Papageorgiou; Chriso Dimitri; Aimilios Mosaidis; Xenofon Lafazanis	Klavdia Papadopoulou; Ariadni Neofitou; Alexis Prevenas; Nikos Farfas; Andreas Ioannou; Konstantinos Savvidis; Giorgos Vanas; Dafni Georgali; Stelios Giannakopoulos	Zachos Karambasis; Iraklis Famellos; Nearchos Evangelou; Konstantinos Angelopoulos; Anna Michailidou; Tzoanna Karaoglou; Zeta Xafaki; Lia Giarleli; Sonia Siskina
Six	Eleonora Zouganeli	Sakis Rouvas	Helena Paparizou	Panos Mouzourakis
Six	Elpida Gad; Giorgos Efthimiadis; Christina Papadopoulou; Anastasios Tsolakidis; Konstantina Kordouli; Manolis Bribos; Manos Makropoulos; Thodoris Verlis; Konstantinos Mathioudakis	**Dimitris Karagiannis**; Eirini Tsokounoglou; Konstantinos Tsimouris; Anna Capone Pappas; Dimitris Gerardos; Mirto Spyropoulou; Aristotelis Polonyfis; Marina Memousai; Sonia Iliadi	Elli Platanou; Konstantina Papastefanaki; Konstantinos Frantzis; Erika Soteri; Ioanna Theocharidou; Makis Meras; Sarah Athina Haidar; Marina Dresiou; Apostolis Diamantopoulos	Kostas Cheilas; Konstantina Ifanti; Nasos Nikolaidis; Tamar Barsamian; Georgia Tzelati; Angelina Statyeva; Georgia Daniilidou; Marialena Tzivanaki; Andromachi Koskeridou
Seven	Athena Vermi; Marcelino Sherifi; Nikos Papoutsis; Virginia Droggoula; Fotini Androulidaki; Constantina Touni; Spyros Vrachliotis	Irene Perikleous; Katerina Batalogianni; Marios Pasialis; Javier Silva Escola; Nadia Iarajouli; Constantina Koutra; Georgia Mani	**Ioanna Georgakopoulou**; Alexandra Sieti; Konstantinos Dimitrakopoulos; Konstantinos Krommidas; Stavros Pilichos; Thanos Lambrou; Nikos Nikolaidis	Nikos Dalakas; Lia Michou; Kalena Ktisti; Alexis Nikolas; Myrtali Nomikou; Nikoleta Roumelioti; Stefanos Karpetis
Eight	Konstantinos Argyros	Sakis Rouvas	Helena Paparizou	Panos Mouzourakis
Eight	N/A	**Anna Argyrou**; Andreas Miliotis	Eleni Olympiou	Eliana Alexandrou
Nine
Nine	Dodona; Moses Papamoyseos; Zafiris Paraschakis; Dionysis Trentafili	Lambros Tsiapoutas; Giannis Tsarsitalidis; José Manuel Arrieta Duarte; Katia Samantzi	Sissy Polydorou; Celina Michael; Theodora Mouratidou	**Maria Sakellari**; Evita Theodoropoulou; Maro Manganiari
Ten	Giorgos Mazonakis†	Helena Paparizou	Christos Mastoras	Panos Mouzourakis
Ten	Vagelis Zoulas; Panos Katsieris	Fey Kross; Yiannis Siachamis	Telemachos Avrantas; Filippa Kokoromytis	**Sofia Chistoforidou**; Evaxania Anthoula
Eleven
Eleven	Christodoulos Mylonas; Vaggos Danezis; Eleni Tsaridou; Andriana Angelopoulou; Dimitris Efthymiou	**Konstantinos Komodromos**; Maria Vardaki; Thodoris Koutsoupias; Gina Makridaki; Rafail Kritoulis	Giorgos & Iordanis; Afroditi Diamantidou; Maria Kosmatou; Marilena Kollarou	Nikos Stefanidis; Avgi Chatzipavlou; Myrto Apostolou; Vikki Chatzí
Twelve	Paola	Helena Paparizou	Christos Mastoras	Panos Mouzourakis
Twelve	Upcoming season			

== Reception ==
=== Critical reception ===
People's Ioannis Tsioulis said that the thing that he missed from the show was the extreme reactions from the contestants' relatives and friends and the backstage. He said about the host that was nerveless circumspect just like he should be. He also mentioned that he missed a coach that is competitive, critical or "bad".

=== Ratings ===
The first season premiered very successfully with 1.78 million viewers, getting ranked first on the weekly top 20. The finale of the first season was as successful as the premiere with over 1.715 million viewers, getting ranked third on the weekly top 20.

Season	Time slot (EET)	# Ep.	Premiered		Ended		TV season	Viewers (in millions)
Season	Time slot (EET)	# Ep.	Date	Viewers (in millions)	Date	Viewers (in millions)	TV season	Viewers (in millions)
One	Friday 9:15 pm (Episodes 1–7, 9–15, 17–18)^{1} Sunday 9:15 pm (Episodes 8, 16)	18	January 10, 2014	1.780	May 9, 2014	1.714	2013–2014	1.566
Two	Sunday 9:00 pm	18	February 15, 2015	1.971	June 21, 2015	1.678	2014–2015	1.681
Three	Wednesday 10:00 pm (Episodes 1,3,5,9,11,13,15,17,19,21); Thursday 10:00 pm (Episodes 2,4,6,8,10,12,14,16,18,20,22,23); Wednesday 9:00 pm (Episode 7); Thursday 9:00 pm (Episodes 24–26)	26	November 16, 2016	0.86	March 2, 2017	0.987	2016–2017	1.058
Four	Tuesday 9:00 pm (Episodes 1,12,16,19,22); Wednesday 9:00 pm (Episodes 2,4,6,8,10,13–14,17,20,23,25,27); Thursday 9:00 pm (Episodes 3,5,7,9,11,15,18,24,26); Sunday 9:00 pm (Episode 21)	27	October 3, 2017	0.919	December 20, 2017	1.306	2017–2018	1.047
Five	Tuesday 9:00 pm (Episodes 1,3,6,9,12,15,18,21,27,30); Wednesday 9:00 pm (Episodes 2,4,7,10,13,16,19,22,25,28,31); Thursday 9:00 pm (Episode 8,11,14,17,20,23,26,29,32); Thursday 8:45 pm (Episode 5); Tuesday 8:45 pm (Episode 24)	32	October 2, 2018	1.016	December 20, 2018	0.990	2018–2019	1.079
Six	Friday 9:00 pm (Episodes 1,3,21,23); Friday 10:00 pm (Episodes 5,7,9,11,13,15,17,19); Sunday 9:00 pm (Episodes 2,4,6,8,10,12,14,16,18,20,22,24-25)	25	September 27, 2019	1.251	December 22, 2019	1.516	2019–2020	1.182
Seven	Sunday 9:00 pm (Episodes 1–15); Friday 9:00 pm (Episodes 16–18, 20–22); Thursday 10:00pm (Episode 19)	22	September 13, 2020	1.217	February 12, 2021	1.028	2020–2021	1.365
Eighth	Saturday 9:00 pm Sunday 9:00 pm	28	September 18, 2021	1.004	December 19, 2021	0.906	2021–2022	0.959
Ninth	Sunday 9:00 pm (Episodes until 12/2022); Saturday 9:00 pm. (Episodes from 1/2023) ^{2}	22	October 2, 2022	0.616	March 11, 2023	0.643	2022–2023	0.622
Ten	Saturday 9:00 pm Sunday 9:00 pm	28	October 12, 2024	0.775	January 19, 2025	0.856	2024–2025	0.872
Eleven	Saturday 9:00 pm Sunday 9:00 pm	31	September 27, 2025	0.721	30 December 2025	0.570	2025-2026	0.881
Twelve	Saturday 9:00 pm Sunday 9:00 pm	2 (1)	October 3 (10), 2026	TBD	TBD	TBD	2026-2027	TBD

Note

1. In Cyprus, the first twelve episodes (except the eighth) were broadcast on Saturday 9:15 pm. However, the rest episodes were broadcast the same day as in Greece.
2. Episodes of the ninth season were broadcast against the 2022 FIFA World Cup, interrupted during the Christmas holidays and resumed after a weeks-long break.

== The Voice Kids ==
After the success of the first season and the renewal of The Voice of Greece, it was reported that the channel is considering to start the kids' version. During the final of first season it was confirmed by the host Giorgos Liagkas that the kids' version of the show would start in the 2014–2015 season. A trailer was first shown on May 9, 2014. After the Final of The Voice of Greece 1. However, the show was cancelled. As of 2026, The Voice Kids has yet to be reconsidered by Skai TV.

== See also ==
- The Voice Kids (Greek TV series)
- The Voice
- The X Factor (Greek TV series)
- Greek Idol
