= Panos Mouzourakis =

Greek singer (born 1979)

Panos Mouzourakis Πάνος Μουζουράκης
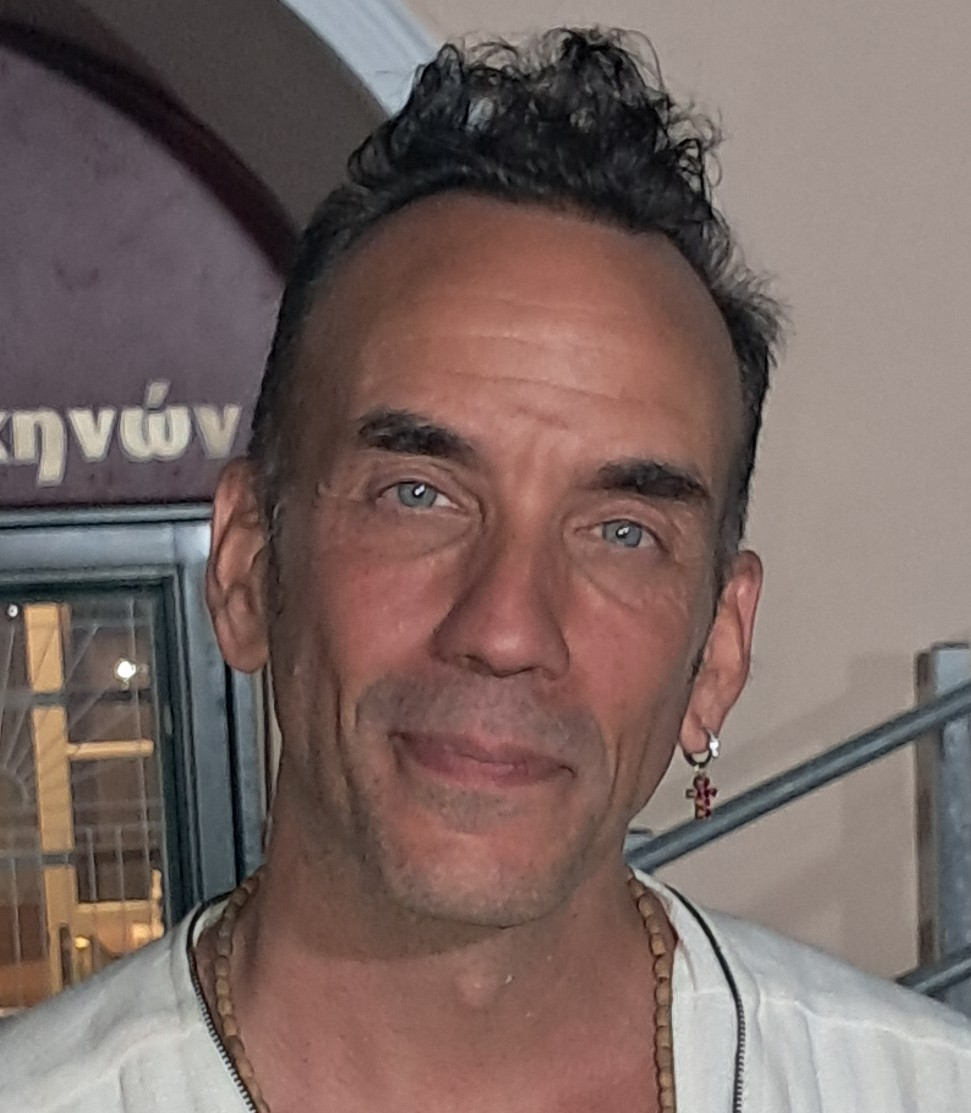

Background information
- Born: Panagiotis Mouzourakis; 24 May 1979 (age 47); Zürich, Switzerland
- Origin: Greece
- Genres: Jazz; Rock; Alternative Rock
- Occupations: Singer; songwriter; television personality; actor
- Instruments: Guitar; Harmonica
- Years active: 1998–present

Panagiotis "Panos" Mouzourakis (Greek: Παναγιώτης (Πάνος) Μουζουράκης; born 24 May 1979) is a Greek singer, songwriter, actor and artist. Born in Zurich and raised in Thessaloniki, he is known for his participation in the Greek television series, Singles and 4.

Internationally, he is best known for playing the role of Lazaros, Sofia's son in Mamma Mia! Here We Go Again, where he performs a cover of "Kisses of Fire".

== Filmography ==
=== Film ===
Year	Title	Role	Notes	Ref.
2008	Liliiiii....	man (voice role)	Film debut	
2011	J.A.C.E.	acrobat #1		
2014	Frozen	Olaf	Voice in Greek-language version	
2014	Really so sudden	Thodoros		
2015	Amore Mio	Tony		
2015	Without milk	Ilias	short film	
2017	Success Story	Jason Solomos		
2018	Mamma Mia! Here We Go Again	Lazaros		
2019	Frozen 2	Olaf	Voice in Greek-language version	

=== Television ===
Year	Title	Role(s)	Notes
2005-2006	John the beautiful guy	various roles	Main role, 20 episodes
2007-2008	S1ngles	Tzamba	Main role, 21 episodes
2009	L.A.P.D.	Bithoulas	1 episode
2009-2010	4	Aris Xenopoulos	Lead role, 26 episodes
2010	MAD Video Music Awards	Himself (performance)	TV special
2010-2011	You cannot take from someone who doesn't have	Menippus (voice role)	Lead role, 14 episodes
2010-2012	Amstel Live: Beacuse we like it that way	Himself (host)	Saturday talk show on Skai TV
2011	MAD Video Music Awards	Himself (performance)	TV special
2014	MAD Video Music Awards	Himself (performance)	TV special
2016	2016 Madame Figaro Awards - Women of the Year	Himself (host)	TV special
2016-present	The Voice of Greece	Himself (coach)	Season 3-12
2017	2017 Madame Figaro Awards - Women of the Year	Himself (host)	TV special
2017	MAD Video Music Awards	Himself (performance)	TV special
2017	Greece's Got Talent	Himself (guest judge)	Judge Cut 4; season 5
2019	ERT1 Love Telethon for Kivotos	Himself (host)	TV special
2022	Nasdrovia	Ringo	TV mini series
2022-2023	The Numbers	Himself	2 episodes
2023	Zoe	singer	3 episodes
