= The Voice (Russian TV series) season 5 =

The Voice
- Season 5
- Presented by: Dmitry Nagiev
- Coaches: Dima Bilan; Polina Gagarina; Leonid Agutin; Grigory Leps
- Winner: Darya Antonyuk
- Winning coach: Leonid Agutin
- Runner-up: Alexander Panayotov

Release
- Original network: Channel One
- Original release: September 2 – December 30, 2016

Season chronology
- ← Previous; Season 4 Next → Season 6

The fifth season of the Russian reality talent show The Voice premiered on September 2, 2016, on Channel One with Polina Gagarina and Grigory Leps returned as coaches alongside Dima Bilan and Leonid Agutin, who returned after a one-season break. Dmitry Nagiev returned as the show's presenter. On December 30, 2016, Darya Antonyuk was crowned the winner of The Voice and Leonid Agutin became the winning coach for the first time ever. With Darya's win, the twenty-year-old became the youngest winner in the show's history.

== Coaches and presenter ==
The Voice season 5 coaching panel

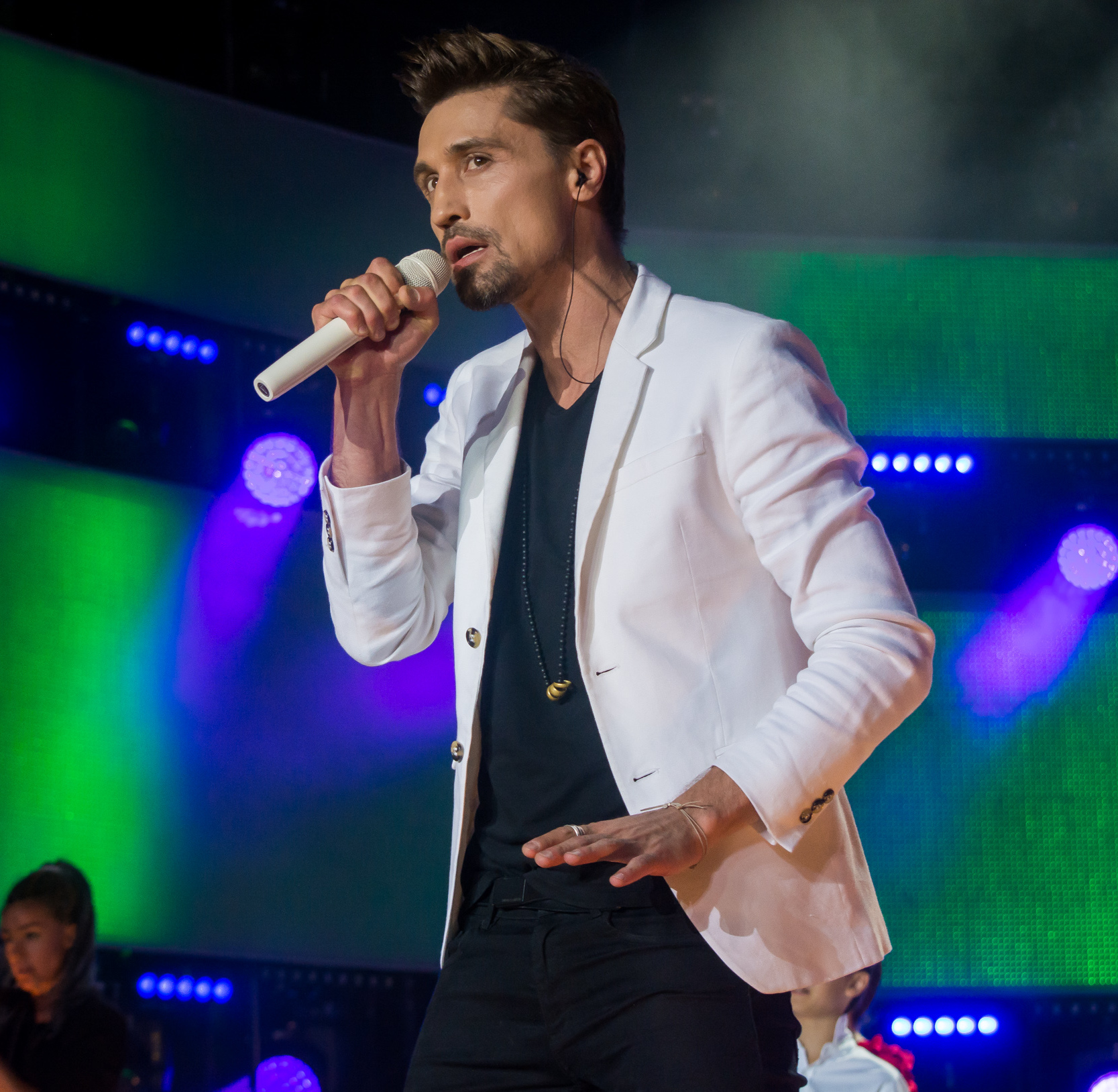
Dima Bilan

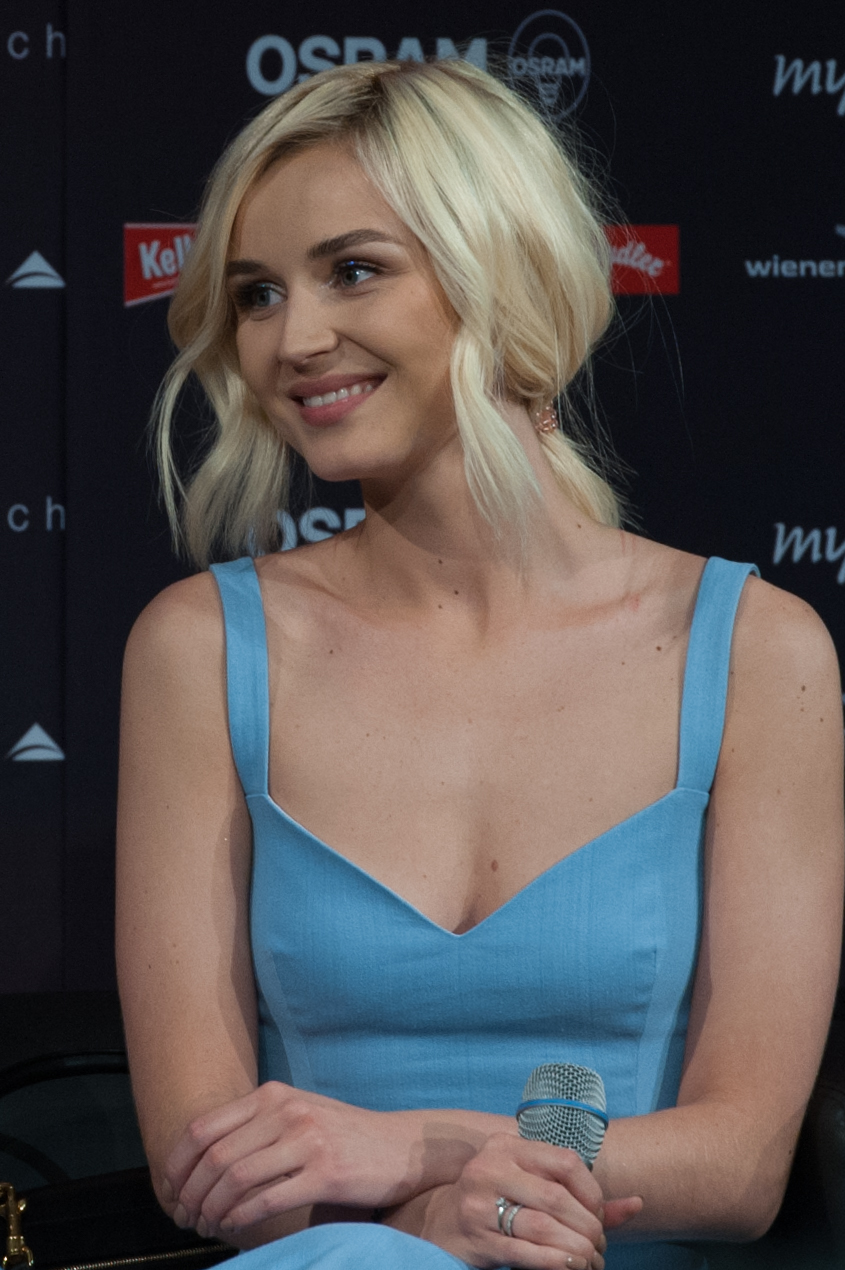
Polina Gagarina

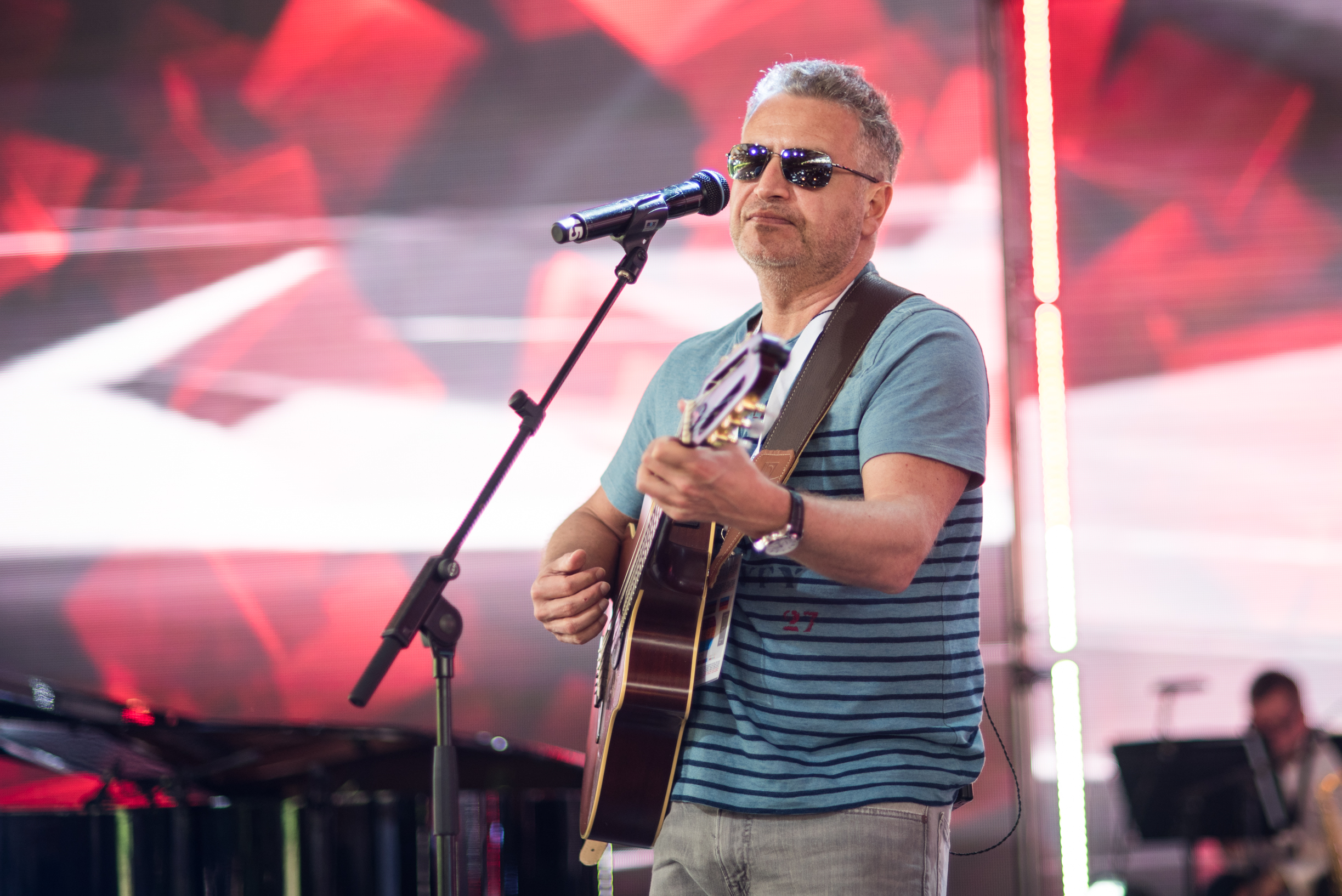
Leonid Agutin

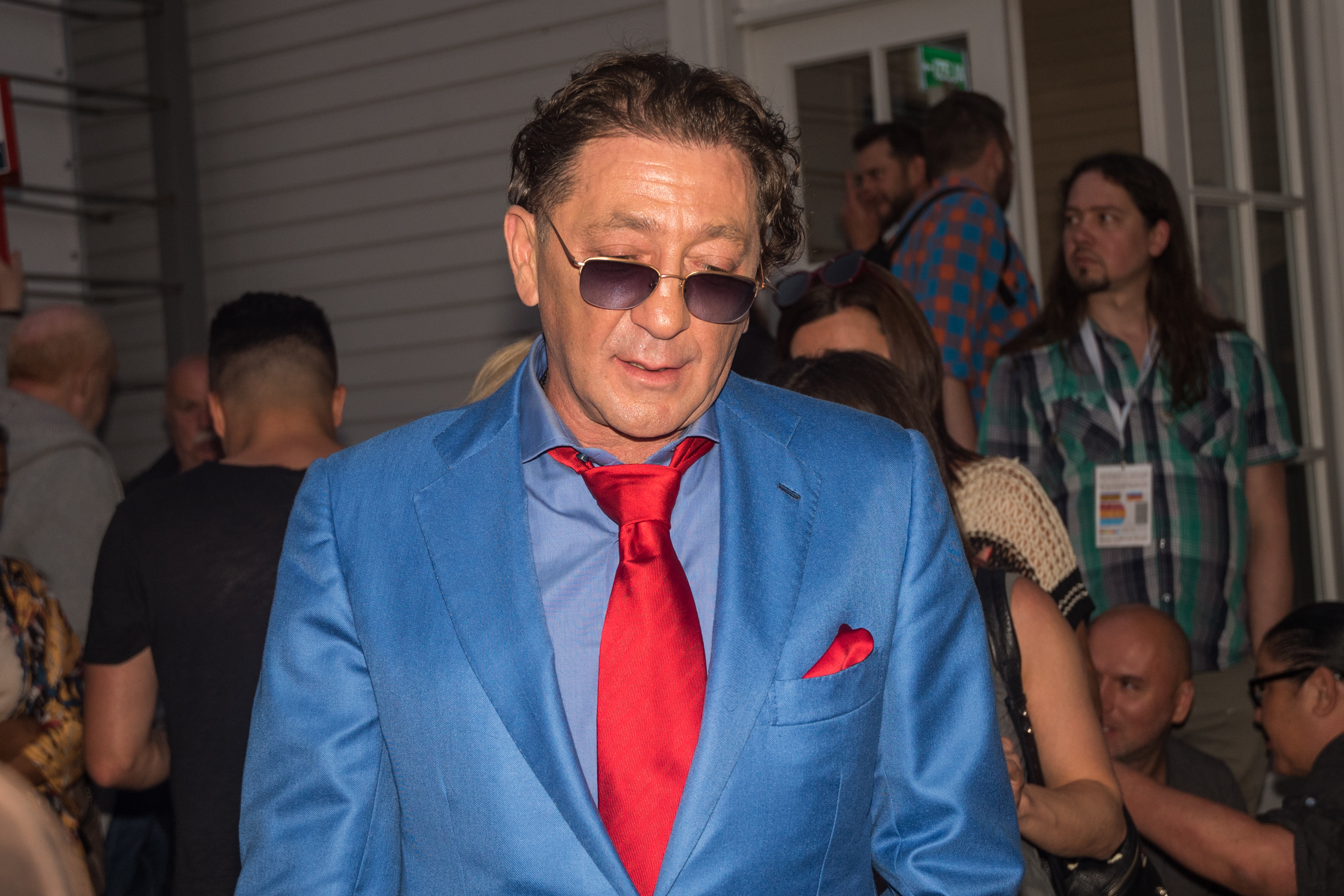
Grigory Leps

== Teams ==
Colour key

- Winner
- Runner-up
- Third place
- Fourth place
- Eliminated in the Semifinal
- Eliminated in the Quarterfinal
- Eliminated in the Knockout rounds
- Stolen in the Battle rounds
- Eliminated in the Battle rounds

Coaches	Top 57 artists					
Dima Bilan						
Dima Bilan	Kairat Primberdiev	Oleg Kondrakov	Oksana Kazakova	Tornike Kvitatiani	Oleg Sidorov	Valeria Gekhner
Dima Bilan	Alena Pol	Yan Mayers	Yury Yushkevich	~~Sardor Milano~~	~~Vladi Blaiberg~~	Polina Kuzovkova
Dima Bilan	Aleksey Romanov	Veriko Tukhashvili	Aurika Mgoi	Ekaterina Gordon		
Polina Gagarina						
Polina Gagarina	Sardor Milano	Mikhail Zhitov	Tatiana Shamanina	Ekaterina Kovskaya	Adelina Moiseeva	Hensley Poynen
Polina Gagarina	Romchi	Aminata Savadogo	Aleksandra Gomel	~~Ilya Khvostov~~	~~Luiza Imangulova~~	Bazhana Zhivotkova
Polina Gagarina	Yulia Litosh	Charlie Armstrong	Aslan Ahmadov	Elena Ekimova		
Leonid Agutin						
Leonid Agutin	Darya Antonyuk	Ksenia Korobkova	Vadim Kapustin	Vladi Blaiberg	Elena Alekseeva	Nikole Knaus
Leonid Agutin	Willie Key	Vladislav Vengley	Boris Sheshera	~~Adelina Moiseeva~~	~~Kairat Primberdiev~~	Alla Goloviznina
Leonid Agutin	Darya Melnikova	Hagba Brothers	Katerina Balykbaeva	Aleksandra Kuznetsova	Andrey Protsenko	
Grigory Leps						
Grigory Leps	Aleksandr Panayotov	Daria Stavrovich	Niko Neman	Luiza Imangulova	Ilya Khvostov	Kirill Babiev
Grigory Leps	Sergey Ruchkin	Yuliana Melkumyan	Evgenia Dravina	~~Elena Alekseeva~~	~~Oleg Kondrakov~~	Alla Omelyuta
Grigory Leps	Marina Makenza	Olga Abdullina	Vasilina Krasnoslobodtseva	Vasiliy Urievskiy		
Note: Italicized names are stolen contestans (names struck through within former names).

== Blind auditions ==
A new feature this season was special episodes of the Blinds. They included all the performances from the previous episode as well as the best performances of those artists who didn't pass the Blind auditions and whose performances were not shown in the previous episode.

Colour key

✔	Coach pressed "I WANT YOU" button
✔	Coach pressed "I WANT YOU" button, despite the lack of places in his/her team
	Coach pressed "I WANT YOU" button, despite the lack of places in his/her team, and artist picked a coach's team
	Artist defaulted to a coach's team
	Artist picked a coach's team
	Artist eliminated with no coach pressing their button

=== Episode 1 (Sep. 2) ===
The winners of previous seasons performed "Мелодия" and the coaches performed "Gimme All Your Lovin'" at the start of the show.

Order	Artist	Age	Origin	Song	Coach's and artist's choices			
Order	Artist	Age	Origin	Song	Bilan	Gagarina	Agutin	Leps
1	Yuliana Melkumyan	22	Saratov, Saratov oblast	"Путь"	✔	✔	✔	✔
2	Tornike Kvitatiani	24	Moscow	"Wicked Game"	✔	✔	—	—
3	Vasilina Krasnoslobodtseva	28	Balashikha, Moscow oblast	"Лирическая песенка"	—	—	—	✔
4	Petr Novikov	38	Moscow	"Bumara"	—	—	—	—
5	Ksenia Korobkova	27	Chernitsyno, Kursk oblast	"I'm Your Baby Tonight"	✔	✔	✔	✔
6	Meriem Gerasimenko	22	Minsk, Belarus	"Вьюга"	—	—	—	—
7	Yury Yushkevich	19	Saint Petersburg	"Ave Maria"	✔	—	—	—
8	Yulia Litosh	37	Sochi, Krasnodar krai	"I Can't Stand the Rain"	—	✔	—	—
9	Alexandr Onischenko	23	Lugansk, Ukraine	"Пьяное солнце"	—	—	—	—
10	Alla Goloviznina	25	Perm, Perm krai	"Старый отель"	✔	—	✔	—
11	Yan Maers	28	Minsk, Belarus	"Starlight"	✔	✔	—	✔

=== Episode 2 (Sep. 9) ===
Order	Artist	Age	Origin	Song	Coach's and artist's choices			
Order	Artist	Age	Origin	Song	Bilan	Gagarina	Agutin	Leps
1	Vladimir Kumarin	37	Tambov, Tambov oblast	"Мой друг лучше всех играет блюз"	—	—	—	—
2	Darya Antonyuk	20	Zelenogorsk, Krasnoyarsk krai	"Stand Up for Love"	✔	✔	✔	✔
3	Valeria Gekhner	45	Saint Petersburg	"Моя цыганская"	✔	✔	✔	—
4	Aleksey Romanov	29	Tyumen, Tyumen oblast	"Rise like a Phoenix"	✔	—	—	—
5	Oksana Andreeva	40	Vlasikha, Moscow oblast	"Соловей"	—	—	—	—
6	Aminata Savadogo	23	Riga, Latvia	"Я тебя не прощу никогда"	✔	✔	—	—
7	Erick Zenkov	26	Kronshtadt, Saint Petersburg	"Ain't Nobody"	—	—	—	—
8	Alexandra Gomel	27	Krasnodar, Krasnodar krai	"What Love Can Be"	✔	✔	✔	—
9	Marianna Popova	29	Moscow	"Созрела"	—	—	—	—
10	Kirill Babiev	26	Rostov-on-Don, Rostov oblast	"Numb"	✔	—	—	✔
11	Darya Melnikova	18	Izhevsk, Udmurtia	"Намалюю тобi зори"	✔	✔	✔	✔
12	Ilya Khvostov	26	Kaliningrad, Kaliningrad Oblast	"Feel"	—	✔	—	—

==== Episode 2.1 (Sep. 10) ====
Order	Artist	Age	Origin	Song
1	Sergey Vorobyev	28	Saransk, Mordovia	"Вечная любовь"
2	Valeria Nekrasova	23	Kazan, Tatarstan	"В кейптаунском порту"
3	Ilya Kuznetsov	27	Saint Petersburg	"This Love"
4	Dinara Kairova	30	Almaty, Kazakhstan	"Hurt"

=== Episode 3 (Sep. 16) ===
Note: Alexander Gordon, a famous journalist, made a special performance with the song "In the Death Car". No coach turned for him.

Order	Artist	Age	Origin	Song	Coach's and artist's choices			
Order	Artist	Age	Origin	Song	Bilan	Gagarina	Agutin	Leps
1	Oksana Kazakova	34	Moscow	"Карточный домик"	✔	✔	✔	✔
2	Vladislav Vengley	21	Saint Petersburg	"Uptown Funk"	✔	✔	✔	—
3	Nikole Knaus	21	Moscow	"New York, New York"	—	✔	✔	✔
4	Karen Arutyunyan	36	Saratov, Saratov oblast	"Дорожная"	—	—	—	—
5	Irina Klimova	49	Moscow	"Там нет меня"	—	—	—	—
6	Willie Key	36	Holguín, Cuba	"La Noche Oscura"	—	✔	✔	—
7	Veriko Tukhashvilli	17	Moscow	"Одно и то же"	✔	—	—	—
8	Mikhail Stovbun	23	Kyiv, Ukraine	"Happy"	—	—	—	—
9	Elena Ekimova	28	Novosibirsk, Novosibirsk oblast	"7 Seconds"	—	✔	—	✔
11	Alla Omelyuta	26	Moscow	"Мой первый день"	—	—	—	✔
12	Sergey Ruchkin	41	Izyum, Ukraine	"Can You Feel the Love Tonight"	✔	✔	—	✔

==== Episode 3.1 (Sep. 17) ====
Order	Artist	Age	Origin	Song
1	Mikhail Davydov	56	Moscow	"Liberta"
2	Ilya Bordo	29	Ekaterinburg, Sverdlovsk oblast	"Верни мне музыку"
3	Maria Sherer	29	Moscow	"I Wanna Be Loved by You"
4	Anna Mart	27	Kirov, Kirov oblast	"Душа"

=== Episode 4 (Sep. 23) ===
Order	Artist	Age	Origin	Song	Coach's and artist's choices			
Order	Artist	Age	Origin	Song	Bilan	Gagarina	Agutin	Leps
1	Hagba Brothers (Temur & Denis Khagba)	35/29	Gudauta, Georgia	"We're in This Love Together"	✔	✔	✔	—
2	Valeria Paskar'	32	Kaliningrad, Kaliningrad oblast	"До свидания, мама!"	—	—	—	—
3	Alena Ter-Osipova	21	Moscow	"Candyman"	—	—	—	—
4	Kairat Primberdiev	31	Bishkek, Kyrgyzstan	"It's a Man's World"	—	✔	✔	—
5	Polina Kuzovkova	27	Saint Petersburg / Ko Pha-ngan, Thailand	"Останусь"	✔	✔	—	—
6	Viktor Burko	39	Korolev, Moscow oblast	"It's a Sin"	—	—	—	—
7	Evgenia Dravina	19	Moscow	"Ты снишься мне"	—	—	—	✔
8	Alexander Panayotov	32	Moscow	"All by Myself"	✔	✔	✔	✔
9	Luiza Imangulova	31	Sukaevka, Samara oblast	"Колечушко"	—	✔	—	—
10	Vasiliy Urievskiy	32	Saratov, Saratov oblast	"Make It Rain"	—	—	—	✔
11	Nikita Savelev	22	Krasnaya Zvezda, Kurgan oblast	"Прощай"	—	—	—	—
12	Vadim Kapustin	43	Barnaul, Altai krai / Los Angeles, United States	"All of Me"	—	✔	✔	✔

==== Episode 4.1 (Sep. 24) ====
Order	Artist	Age	Origin	Song
1	Sergey Dusik	34	Yugorsk, Yugra	"Чорнобрiвцы"
2	Karina Karenyan	32	Ekaterinburg, Sverdlovsk oblast	"Highway to Hell"
3	Dina Shtern	33	Moscow	"Streets of New York"
4	Irina Surina	50	Moscow	"Звать любовь не надо"

=== Episode 5 (Sep. 30) ===
Note: Maxim Galkin, a famous comedian and presenter, made a special performance with "The Magic Flute"'s aria "Soll ich dich, Teurer, nicht mehr sehn?". Dima and Polina turned for him.

Order	Artist	Age	Origin	Song	Coach's and artist's choices			
Order	Artist	Age	Origin	Song	Bilan	Gagarina	Agutin	Leps
1	Egor Kovaikov	35	Riga, Latvia	"Bamboléo"	—	—	—	—
2	Ekaterina Gordon	35	Moscow	"Забирай рай"	✔	—	—	—
3	Charlie Armstrong	48	Bridgetown, Barbados	"You're the First, the Last, My Everything"	—	✔	—	—
4	Alexandra Kuznetsova	28	Saint Petersburg	"Молчи и обнимай меня крепче"	✔	✔	✔	—
5	Ekaterina Viktorova	22	Orsk, Orenburg Oblast	"Шиншилла"	—	—	—	—
6	Oleg Kondrakov	31	Dzerzhinsk, Niznhy Novgorod oblast	"Billie Jean"	—	✔	✔	✔
7	Alena Pol'	29	Surgut, Yugra	"Apres moi" / "Февраль"	✔	✔	—	—
8	Aslan Ahmadov	43	Baku, Azerbaijan	"Gee, Baby, Ain't I Good to You"	—	✔	✔	—
9	Andrey Vesenin	28	Barnaul, Altai krai	"Чёрный ворон"	—	—	—	—
10	Vladi Blaiberg	33	Tel Aviv, Israel	"All in Love Is Fair"	✔	—	—	—
11	Daria Stavrovich	30	Moscow	"Zombie"	✔	✔	✔	✔

==== Episode 5.1 (Oct. 1) ====
Order	Artist	Age	Origin	Song
1	Lana Rey	27	Zhitomir, Ukraine	"Come Together"
2	Vladimir Idiatullin	21	Taganrog, Rostov oblast	"Часы"
3	Tinatin Didebashvili	44	Tbilisi, Georgia	"Напрасные слова"
4	Ekaterina Tretyakova	25	Novosibirsk, Novosibirsk oblast	"Жёлтые ботинки"

=== Episode 6 (Oct. 14) ===
Note: Inga Lepsveridze, Grigory Leps' daughter, made a special performance with the song "Not About Angels". No coach turned for her.

Order	Artist	Age	Origin	Song	Coach's and artist's choices			
Order	Artist	Age	Origin	Song	Bilan	Gagarina	Agutin	Leps
1	Mikhail Zhitov	25	Arkhangelsk, Arkhangelsk oblast	"Moody's Mood for Love"	✔	✔	✔	✔
2	Natalya Kirillova	30	Nizhniy Novgorod, Nizhniy Novgorod oblast	"Песня Анюты"	—	—	—	—
3	Hensley Poinen	27	Quatre Bornes, Mauritius	"Wake Me Up"	—	✔	✔	—
4	Vladislav Rusakov	22	Barnaul, Altai krai	"Как я тебя ждал"	—	—	—	—
5	Niko Neman	33	Sochi, Krasnodar krai	"Ария Калафа"	—	✔	✔	✔
6	Ksenia Milyaeva	27	Yalta, Ukraine	"С тобой"	—	—	—	—
7	Romchi (Roman Bagadzhiyan)	19	Rostov-on-Don, Rostov oblast	"All of Me"	—	✔	✔	✔
8	Aurika Mgoi	21	Izhevsk, Udmurtia	"Crazy"	✔	—	—	—
9	Tatiana Shamanina	35	Nizhnevartovsk, Yugra	"Нелюбовь"	—	✔	✔	✔
10	Oleg Sidorov	22	Krasnoznamensk, Moscow oblast	"От боли я пою"	✔	—	—	—
11	Marina Makenza	32	Kamianets-Podilskyi, Ukraine	"Play Dead"	—	—	✔	✔

==== Episode 6.1 (Oct. 8) ====
Order	Artist	Age	Origin	Song
1	Ksenia Kondratova	23	Zarechye, Moscow oblast	"Нежность"
2	Anton Stogniev	28	Surgut, Yugra	"Wonderwall"
3	Anastasia Malashkevich	23	Minsk, Belarus	"I'm Outta Love"
4	Rada Vaschenko	28	Riga, Latvia / Germany	"Солнышко"

=== Episode 7 (Oct. 14) ===
Note: Nikolay Baskov, a famous singer, made a special performance with the song "Il mondo". Dima and Polina turned for him.

Order	Artist	Age	Origin	Song	Coach's and artist's choices			
Order	Artist	Age	Origin	Song	Bilan	Gagarina	Agutin	Leps
1	Anastasia Danilova	26	Sochi, Krasnodar krai	"One Day"	—	—	—	—
2	Ekaterina Kovskaya	32	Saint Petersburg	"Ты скажи"	✔	✔	—	—
3	Boris Sheshera	21	Kumertau, Bashkortostan	"Someone Tell Me Why"	✔	—	✔	✔
4	Elena Alekseeva	37	Velikie Luki, Pskov oblast	"Roxanne"	—	✔	✔	✔
5	Sofia Beria	20	Divnogorsk, Krasnoyarsk krai	"Не для меня"	—	—	—	—
6	Sardor Milano	24	Tashkent, Uzbekistan	"Vo Che Sapete"	✔	✔	✔	✔
7	Adelina Moiseeva	20	Lugansk, Ukraine	"You Are So Beautiful"	Team full	—	✔	✔
8	Bazhana Zhivotkova	32	Kyiv, Ukraine	"Ой, чий то кiнь стоïть"	Team full	✔	—	—
9	Katerina Balykbaeva	47	Tiraspol, Moldova / Yalta, Ukraine	"Hijo de la luna"	Team full	Team full	✔	—
10	Olga Abdullina	32	Tyumen, Tyumen Oblast	"Dr. Feelgood"	Team full	Team full	—	✔
11	Andrey Protsenko	54	Tashkent, Uzbekistan / Moscow	"Change the World"	Team full	Team full	✔	Team full

==== Episode 7.1 (Oct. 15) ====
Order	Artist	Age	Origin	Song
1	Aleksey Petrukhin	32	Astana, Kazakhstan	"Ах, ты, степь широкая"
2	Kristina Pronina	32	Baku, Azerbaijan	"Euphoria"
3	Valeria Filippova	23	Omsk, Omsk oblast	"Take Me to Church"
4	Alesya Chernookaya	24	Tyumen, Tyumen oblast	"Маршрутка"

== The Battles ==
The Battles round started with episode 8 and ended with episode 11 (broadcast on 21, 28 October 2016, on 4, 11 November 2016). The coaches can steal two losing artists from another coach. Contestants who win their battle or are stolen by another coach will advance to the Knockout rounds.

Colour key

Artist won the Battle and advanced to the Knockouts
Artist lost the Battle but was stolen by another coach and advanced to the Knockouts
Artist lost the Battle and was eliminated

Episode	Coach	Order	Winner	Song	Loser(s)	'Steal' result			
Episode	Coach	Order	Winner	Song	Loser(s)	Bilan	Gagarina	Agutin	Leps
Episode 8 (21 October)	Grigory Leps	1	Sergey Ruchkin	"Лондон"	Vasiliy Urievskiy	—	—	—	—N/a
Episode 8 (21 October)	Polina Gagarina	2	Mikhail Zhitov	"Runnin'"	Elena Ekimova	—	—N/a	—	—
Episode 8 (21 October)	Dima Bilan	3	Valeria Gekhner	"Заболеть бы"	Ekaterina Gordon	—N/a	—	—	—
Episode 8 (21 October)	Leonid Agutin	4	Vladislav Vengley	"Black or White"	Kairat Primberdiev	✔	—	—N/a	—
Episode 8 (21 October)	Polina Gagarina	5	Ekaterina Kovskaya	"Зима в сердце"	Aslan Ahmadov	—	—N/a	—	—
Episode 8 (21 October)	Grigory Leps	6	Niko Neman	"I Want to Break Free"	Vasilina Krasnoslobodtseva	—	—	—	—N/a
Episode 8 (21 October)	Leonid Agutin	7	Ksenia Korobkova	"Проститься"	Andrey Protsenko	—	—	—N/a	—
Episode 9 (28 October)	Polina Gagarina	1	Aminata Savadogo	"It's a Man's World"	Charlie Armstrong	—	—N/a	—	—
Episode 9 (28 October)	Leonid Agutin	2	Boris Sheshera	"Если ты когда-нибудь меня простишь"	Aleksandra Kuznetsova	—	—	—N/a	—
Episode 9 (28 October)	Dima Bilan	3	Oleg Sidorov	"Something Got Me Started"	Aurika Mgoi	—N/a	—	—	—
Episode 9 (28 October)	Grigory Leps	4	Yuliana Melkumyan	"Ещё люблю"	Olga Abdullina	—	—	—	—N/a
Episode 9 (28 October)	Dima Bilan	5	Tornike Kvitatiani	"Помолимся за родителей"	Vladi Blaiberg	—N/a	—	✔	—
Episode 9 (28 October)	Leonid Agutin	6	Willie Key	"Besame mucho" / "Desert Rose" / "Siboney"	Katerina Balykbaeva	—	—	—N/a	—
Episode 9 (28 October)	Grigory Leps	7	Daria Stavrovich	"From Yesterday"	Oleg Kondrakov	✔	—	—	—N/a
Episode 10 (4 November)	Polina Gagarina	1	Aleksandra Gomel	"Алло"	Yulia Litosh	Team full	—N/a	—	—
Episode 10 (4 November)	Grigory Leps	2	Kirill Babiev	"Whataya Want from Me"	Marina Makenza	Team full	—	—	—N/a
Episode 10 (4 November)	Polina Gagarina	3	Tatiana Shamanina	"Сестричка" / "Пошла млада"	Luiza Imangulova	Team full	—N/a	—	✔
Episode 10 (4 November)	Leonid Agutin	4	Darya Antonyuk	"That's What Friends Are For"	Hagba Brothers	Team full	—	—N/a	—
Episode 10 (4 November)	Grigory Leps	5	Evgenia Dravina	"Обними"	Alla Omelyuta	Team full	—	—	—N/a
Episode 10 (4 November)	Dima Bilan	6	Oksana Kazakova	"How It Used to Be"	Sardor Milano	Team full	✔	—	—
Episode 10 (4 November)	Dima Bilan	7	Yury Yushkevich	"May It Be"	Veriko Tukhashvilli	Team full	—	—	—
Episode 11 (11 November)	Leonid Agutin	1	Nikole Knaus	"Самая лучшая"	Alla Goloviznina	Team full	—	—N/a	—
Episode 11 (11 November)	Leonid Agutin	1	Nikole Knaus	"Самая лучшая"	Darya Melnikova	Team full	—	—N/a	—
Episode 11 (11 November)	Grigory Leps	2	Aleksandr Panayotov	"Woman in Chains"	Elena Alekseeva	✔	—	✔	—
Episode 11 (11 November)	Polina Gagarina	3	Romchi	"Притяженья больше нет"	Bazhana Zhivotkova	Team full	—N/a	Team full	—
Episode 11 (11 November)	Dima Bilan	4	Alena Pol	"Corner of the Earth"	Polina Kuzovkova	Team full	—	Team full	—
Episode 11 (11 November)	Polina Gagarina	5	Hensley Poinen	"Just the Way You Are"	Ilya Khvostov	Team full	—N/a	Team full	✔
Episode 11 (11 November)	Dima Bilan	6	Yan Maers	"Колокол далей небесных"	Aleksey Romanov	Team full	—	Team full	Team full
Episode 11 (11 November)	Leonid Agutin	7	Vadim Kapustin	"Moon Dance"	Adelina Moiseeva	Team full	✔	Team full	Team full

== The Knockouts ==
The Knockouts round started with episode 12 and ended with episode 14 (broadcast on 18, 25 November 2016; on 2 December 2016). The top 24 contestants will then move on to the "Live Shows."

Colour key

Artist won the Knockout and advanced to the Live shows
Artist lost the Knockout and was eliminated

Episode	Coach	Order	Song	Artists		Song
Episode	Coach	Order	Song	Winners	Loser	Song
Episode 12 (18 November)	Polina Gagarina	1	"La La La"	Mikhail Zhitov	Alexandra Gomel	"Кеды"
Episode 12 (18 November)	Polina Gagarina	1	"Come Together"	Hensley Poinen	Alexandra Gomel	"Кеды"
Episode 12 (18 November)	Dima Bilan	2	"I Was Born to Love You"	Valeria Gekhner	Yury Yushkevich	"Поклонники"
Episode 12 (18 November)	Dima Bilan	2	"Только"	Oleg Sidorov	Yury Yushkevich	"Поклонники"
Episode 12 (18 November)	Leonid Agutin	3	"Если он уйдёт"	Darya Antonyuk	Boris Sheshera	"Personal Jesus"
Episode 12 (18 November)	Leonid Agutin	3	"Чудесная страна"	Vadim Kapustin	Boris Sheshera	"Personal Jesus"
Episode 12 (18 November)	Grigory Leps	4	"Me Voy"	Luiza Imangulova	Evgenia Dravina	"Вечная любовь"
Episode 12 (18 November)	Grigory Leps	4	"Too Close"	Ilya Khvostov	Evgenia Dravina	"Вечная любовь"
Episode 13 (25 November)	Grigory Leps	1	"Я свободен"	Niko Neman	Yuliana Melkumyan	"Поздно"
Episode 13 (25 November)	Grigory Leps	1	"Падаю в небо"	Kirill Babiev	Yuliana Melkumyan	"Поздно"
Episode 13 (25 November)	Polina Gagarina	2	"Скажи нет"	Ekaterina Kovskaya	Aminata Savadogo	"Обернись"
Episode 13 (25 November)	Polina Gagarina	2	"Я тебя поцеловала"	Adelina Moiseeva	Aminata Savadogo	"Обернись"
Episode 13 (25 November)	Leonid Agutin	3	"His Eye Is on the Sparrow"	Nikole Knaus	Vladislav Vengley	"Fall in Love"
Episode 13 (25 November)	Leonid Agutin	3	"Звёздочка моя ясная"	Vladi Blaiberg	Vladislav Vengley	"Fall in Love"
Episode 13 (25 November)	Dima Bilan	4	"Ночь"	Oleg Kondrakov	Yan Maers	"Breach the Line"
Episode 13 (25 November)	Dima Bilan	4	"Abrazame"	Tornike Kvitatiani	Yan Maers	"Breach the Line"
Episode 14 (2 December)	Dima Bilan	1	"Старинные часы"	Oksana Kazakova	Alena Pol	"Девка по саду ходила"
Episode 14 (2 December)	Dima Bilan	1	"The Best"	Kairat Primberdiev	Alena Pol	"Девка по саду ходила"
Episode 14 (2 December)	Leonid Agutin	2	"You're Not From Here"	Ksenia Korobkova	Willie Key	"Я поднимаю свой бокал"
Episode 14 (2 December)	Leonid Agutin	2	"Я сама своя"	Elena Alekseeva	Willie Key	"Я поднимаю свой бокал"
Episode 14 (2 December)	Polina Gagarina	3	"The Edge of Glory"	Tatiana Shamanina	Romchi	"Stayin' Alive"
Episode 14 (2 December)	Polina Gagarina	3	"Caruso"	Sardor Milano	Romchi	"Stayin' Alive"
Episode 14 (2 December)	Grigory Leps	4	"Телефонная книжка"	Alexander Panayotov	Sergey Ruchkin	"Everytime You Go Away"
Episode 14 (2 December)	Grigory Leps	4	"Круги на воде"	Daria Stavrovich	Sergey Ruchkin	"Everytime You Go Away"

== Live shows ==
Colour key:

Artist was saved
Artist was eliminated

=== Week 1, 2: Quarterfinals (9 and 16 December) ===
The Top 24 performed on Fridays, 9 and 16 December 2016. The two artists with the fewest votes from each team left the competition by the end of each episode.

Episode	Coach	Order	Artist	Song	Coach's vote (/100%)	Public's vote (/100%)	Votes' sum	Result
Episode 15 (9 December)	Leonid Agutin	1	Vladi Blaiberg	"Я вспоминаю"	20%	24.2%	44.2%	Eliminated
Episode 15 (9 December)	Leonid Agutin	2	Elena Alekseeva	"La Belle Dame Sans Regrets"	30%	12.9%	42.9%	Eliminated
Episode 15 (9 December)	Leonid Agutin	3	Darya Antonyuk	"Колокол"	50%	62.9%	112.9%	Advanced
Episode 15 (9 December)	Polina Gagarina	4	Adelina Moiseeva	"Valerie"	20%	19.5%	39.5%	Eliminated
Episode 15 (9 December)	Polina Gagarina	5	Tatiana Shamanina	"К тебе"	50%	18.5%	68.5%	Eliminated
Episode 15 (9 December)	Polina Gagarina	6	Sardor Milano	"Taki Rari"	30%	62%	92%	Advanced
Episode 15 (9 December)	Dima Bilan	7	Tornike Kvitatiani	"Осколки лета"	20%	45.9%	65.9%	Eliminated
Episode 15 (9 December)	Dima Bilan	8	Oleg Sidorov	"Wrecking Ball"	30%	18.7%	48.7%	Eliminated
Episode 15 (9 December)	Dima Bilan	9	Kairat Primberdiev	"Я спросил у ясеня..."	50%	35.4%	85.4%	Advanced
Episode 15 (9 December)	Grigory Leps	10	Niko Neman	"Ария Канио"	30%	27.6%	57.6%	Eliminated
Episode 15 (9 December)	Grigory Leps	11	Ilya Khvostov	"Небо Лондона"	20%	34.5%	54.5%	Eliminated
Episode 15 (9 December)	Grigory Leps	12	Daria Stavrovich	"Army of Me"	50%	37.9%	87.9%	Advanced
Episode 16 (16 December)
Episode 16 (16 December)	Polina Gagarina	1	Ekaterina Kovskaya	"Поднимись над суетой"	30%	24.9%	54.9%	Eliminated
Episode 16 (16 December)	Polina Gagarina	2	Hensley Poinen	"Fragile"	20%	12.2%	32.2%	Eliminated
Episode 16 (16 December)	Polina Gagarina	3	Mikhail Zhitov	"Малыш"	50%	62.9%	112.9%	Advanced
Episode 16 (16 December)	Dima Bilan	4	Oksana Kazakova	"The Power of Love"	30%	41.4%	71.4%	Eliminated
Episode 16 (16 December)	Dima Bilan	5	Valeria Gekhner	"Руки"	20%	16%	36%	Eliminated
Episode 16 (16 December)	Dima Bilan	6	Oleg Kondrakov	"Recovery"	50%	42.6%	92.6%	Advanced
Episode 16 (16 December)	Grigory Leps	7	Luiza Imangulova	"Вера"	30%	24.7%	54.7%	Eliminated
Episode 16 (16 December)	Grigory Leps	8	Alexander Panayotov	"Зачем тебе я"	50%	53.1%	103.1%	Advanced
Episode 16 (16 December)	Grigory Leps	9	Kirill Babiev	"Closer to the Edge"	20%	22.2%	42.2%	Eliminated
Episode 16 (16 December)	Leonid Agutin	10	Nikole Knaus	"Love on Top"	20%	19.7%	39.7%	Eliminated
Episode 16 (16 December)	Leonid Agutin	11	Ksenia Korobkova	"Adagio"	30%	56.7%	86.7%	Advanced
Episode 16 (16 December)	Leonid Agutin	12	Vadim Kapustin	"Easy"	50%	23.6%	73.6%	Eliminated

=== Week 3: Semifinal (23 December) ===
The Top 8 performed on Friday, 23 December 2016. One artist with the fewest votes from each team left the competition.

Episode	Coach	Order	Artist	Song	Coach's vote (/100%)	Public's vote (/100%)	Votes' summa	Result
Episode 17 (23 December)
Episode 17 (23 December)	Dima Bilan	1	Kairat Primberdiev	"And I'm Telling You"	60%	58.8%	118.8%	Advanced
Episode 17 (23 December)	Dima Bilan	2	Oleg Kondrakov	"Лети, Лиза"	40%	41.2%	81.2%	Eliminated
Episode 17 (23 December)	Polina Gagarina	3	Sardor Milano	"Il Mio Coure Va"	60%	52.3%	112.3%	Advanced
Episode 17 (23 December)	Polina Gagarina	4	Mikhail Zhitov	"Бабушка"	40%	47.7%	87.7%	Eliminated
Episode 17 (23 December)	Leonid Agutin	5	Darya Antonyuk	"Somebody to Love"	60%	72%	132%	Advanced
Episode 17 (23 December)	Leonid Agutin	6	Ksenia Korobkova	"Я всё ещё люблю"	40%	28%	68%	Eliminated
Episode 17 (23 December)	Grigory Leps	7	Daria Stavrovich	"Chandelier"	40%	35.1%	75.1%	Eliminated
Episode 17 (23 December)	Grigory Leps	8	Alexander Panayotov	"Не тревожь мне душу, скрипка"	60%	64.9%	124.9%	Advanced

Non-competition performances
Order	Performers	Song
17.1	Nikolai Noskov, Kairat Primberdiev, and Oleg Kondrakov	"Паранойя"
17.2	IOWA, Sardor Milano, and Mikhail Zhitov	"Бьёт бит"
17.3	Evgeny Margulis, Darya Antonyuk, and Ksenia Korobkova	"Шанхай-блюз"
17.4	Valery Meladze, Aleksandr Panayotov, and Daria Stavrovich	"Текила-любовь"

=== Week 4: Final (30 December) ===
The Top 4 performed on Friday, 30 December 2016. This week, the four finalists performed two solo cover songs and a duet with their coach.

Coach	Artist	Order	Duet Song (with Coach)	Order	Solo Song (no.1)	Order	Solo Song (no.2)	Result	
Polina Gagarina	Sardor Milano	1	"Навек"	5	"Улетай на крыльях ветра"	Eliminated		Fourth place	
Dima Bilan	Kairat Primberdiev	2	"Trouble"	6	"Как молоды мы были"	9	"Unchain My Heart"	Third place	
Grigory Leps	Alexander Panayotov	3	"Я слушал дождь"	7	"Исповедь"	10	"Careless Whisper"	Runner-up	46.3%
Leonid Agutin	Darya Antonyuk	4	"Твой голос"	8	"Without You"	11	"Дорогой длинною"	Winner	53.7%

Non-competition performances
Order	Performer	Song
18.1	Kairat Primberdiev, Sardor Milano, Darya Antonyuk, Aleksandr Panayotov	"Ti amo"
18.2	Sardor Milano (with Hensley Poinen on guitar)	"Circle of Life"
18.3	Darya Antonyuk (winner)	"Дорогой длинною"
18.4	All artists of the 5th season	"Жить"

== Reception ==
=== Rating ===
Episode		Original airdate	Production	Time slot (UTC+3)	Audience		Source
Episode		Original airdate	Production	Time slot (UTC+3)	Rating	Share	Source
1	"The Blind Auditions Premiere"	September 2, 2016	501	Friday 9:30 p.m.	6.8	23.5	
2	"The Blind Auditions, Part 2"	September 9, 2016	502	Friday 9:30 p.m.	7.1	23.9	
3	"The Blind Auditions, Part 3"	September 16, 2016	503	Friday 9:30 p.m.	7.3	24.9	
4	"The Blind Auditions, Part 4"	September 23, 2016	504	Friday 9:30 p.m.	7.7	24.9	
5	"The Blind Auditions, Part 5"	September 30, 2016	505	Friday 9:30 p.m.	8.6	27.8	
6	"The Blind Auditions, Part 6"	October 7, 2016	506	Friday 9:30 p.m.	8.1	25.7	
7	"The Blind Auditions, Part 7"	October 14, 2016	507	Friday 9:30 p.m.	8.1	25.7	
8	"The Battles Premiere"	October 21, 2016	508	Friday 9:30 p.m.	8.0	24.6	
9	"The Battles, Part 2"	October 28, 2016	509	Friday 9:30 p.m.	7.7	23.8	
10	"The Battles, Part 3"	November 4, 2016	510	Friday 9:30 p.m.	6.3	19.6	
11	"The Battles, Part 4"	November 11, 2016	511	Friday 9:30 p.m.	7.1	21.5	
12	"The Knocĸouts Premiere"	November 18, 2016	512	Friday 9:30 p.m.	6.9	21.5	
13	"The Knockouts, Part 2"	November 25, 2016	513	Friday 9:30 p.m.	6.8	22	
14	"The Knockouts, Part 3"	December 2, 2016	514	Friday 9:30 p.m.	6.6	21.3	
15	"Live Quarterfinal Premiere"	December 9, 2016	515	Friday 9:30 p.m.	5.8	18.8	
16	"Live Quarterfinal, Part 2"	December 16, 2016	516	Friday 9:30 p.m.	6.2	18.8	
17	"Live Semifinal"	December 23, 2016	517	Friday 9:30 p.m.	6.0	19.8	
18	"Live Season Final"	December 30, 2016	518	Friday 9:30 p.m.	6.3	18.8	
