= Darya Antonyuk =

Russian singer (born 1996)

Darya Antonyuk Дарья Антонюк
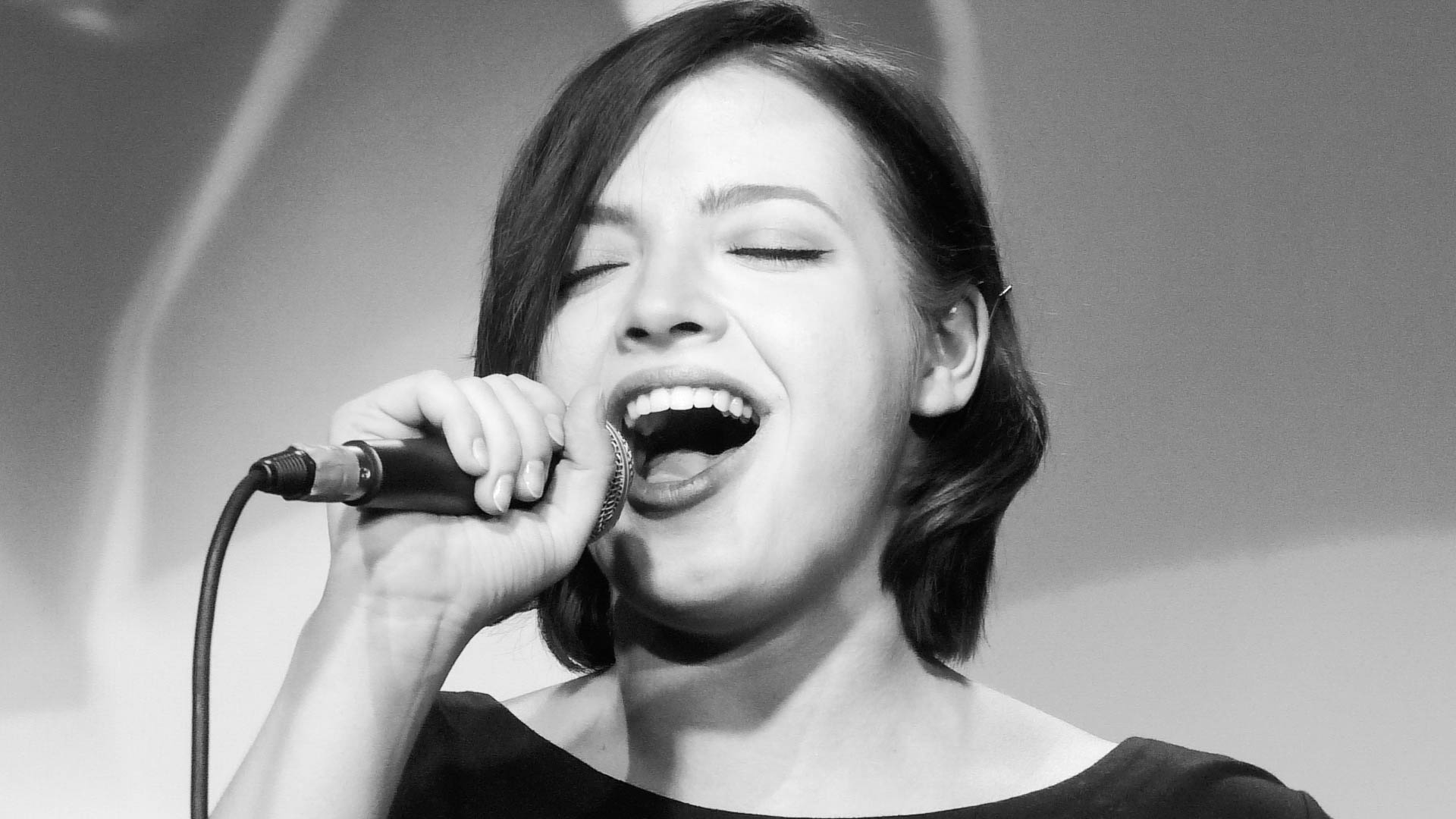

Background information
- Also known as: Daria Antonyuk
- Born: Darya Sergeyevna Antonyuk; 25 January 1996 (age 30); Zelenogorsk, Russia
- Genres: Pop; rock; crossover; soul
- Occupation: Singer
- Instruments: Vocals; Violin
- Years active: 2011–present

Darya Antonyuk, sometimes Daria Antonyuk (Russian: Дарья Антонюк, born 25 January 1996) is a Russian singer. She is the winner of season five of the Russian version of The Voice.

On 30 December 2016, Antonyuk was declared the winner of season five of The Voice. Throughout her time on the show, she was coached by Russian musician Leonid Agutin.

== Life and career ==
Darya Antonyuk was born on 25 January 1996 in Zelenogorsk, Krasnoyarsk Krai. Her mother, Svetlana Vladimirovna Antonyuk, is a director of the school of additional education for children; her father, Sergei Vladimirovich Antonyuk, is a firefighter. Darya's parents are divorced.

In her childhood she studied ballet and modern choreography, and also studied at a music school. In her native city from the age of 7 Dasha had been studied in the vocal studio "Talisman", and from the young age she has won awards at vocal competitions. At the end of the middle school, in 2014 she came to Moscow, where she successfully passed the exams in four universities, but she stopped her choice at the Moscow Art Theater School (the course of Igor Zolotovitsky). She made her theatrical debut in 2016, Darya played Mary Bennet in A. Frantetti's play "Pride and Prejudice".

=== The Voice ===
Darya auditioned in 2016 to compete in season 5 of The Voice. In the blind auditions, broadcast on 9 September 2016 on Channel One, she sang "Stand Up for Love". All four coaches, Dima Bilan, Polina Gagarina, Leonid Agutin, and Grigory Leps turned their chairs. She chose to join Team Leonid.

The Voice performances
– Studio version of song reached the top performances that week

Stage	Song	Original artist	Date	Order	Result
Blind Audition	"Stand Up for Love"	Destiny's Child	9 September 2016	2.2	All coaches turned; joined Team Leonid
Battle Rounds (Top 57)	"That's What Friends Are For" (vs. Hagba Brothers)	Rod Stewart	4 November 2016	10.4	Saved by Coach
Knockout Rounds (Top 36)	"Если он уйдёт" (vs. Vadim Kapustin, vs. Boris Sheshera)	Anzhelika Varum	18 November 2016	12.8	Saved by Coach
Live Quarterfinals (Top 24)	"Колокол"	Tamara Gverdtsiteli	9 December 2016	15.3	Saved by Votes Summa
Live Semifinal (Top 8)	"Somebody to Love"	Queen	23 December 2016	17.5	Saved by Votes Summa
Live Final (Top 4)	"Твой голос" (with Leonid Agutin)	Leonid Agutin	30 December 2016	18.4	Winner
Live Final (Top 4)	"Without You"	Mariah Carey	30 December 2016	18.8	Winner
Live Final (Top 4)	"Дорогой длинною"	Alexander Vertinsky	30 December 2016	18.11	Winner

Non competition performances
Order	Collaborator(s)	Song	Original Artist
17.3	Evgeniy Margulis and Ksenia Korobkova	"Шанхай-блюз"	Evgeniy Margulis
18.1	Kairat Primberdiev, Sardor Milano and Aleksandr Panayotov	"Ti amo"	Umberto Tozzi
18.4	Other constants of the 5th season	"Жить"	Grigory Leps, Polina Gagarina, and other Russian musicians

== Discography ==
=== Singles ===
==== Releases from The Voice ====
- 2016: "Stand Up for Love"
- 2016: "That's What Friends Are For" (with Hagba Brothers)
- 2016: "Если он уйдёт" ("If He'll Leave Me")
- 2016: "Колокол" ("The Toller")
- 2016: "Somebody to Love"
- 2016: "Твой голос" ("Your Voice") (with Leonid Agutin)
- 2016: "Without You"
- 2016: "Дорогой длинною"

Preceded by Hieromonk Fotiy	Winner of Golos; 2016	Succeeded by Incumbent
