= Russia in the Eurovision Song Contest 2017 =

- Eurovision Song Contest 2017
- Country: Russia
- Selection process: Internal selection
- Announcement date: 12 March 2017

Competing entry
- Song: "Flame Is Burning"
- Artist: Julia Samoylova
- Songwriters: Leonid Gutkin; Netta Nimrodi; Arie Burshtein

Placement
- Final result: Withdrawn

Participation chronology

Russia was set to be represented at the Eurovision Song Contest 2017 with the song "Flame Is Burning", written by Leonid Gutkin, Netta Nimrodi, and Arie Burshtein, and performed by Julia Samoylova. The Russian participating broadcaster, Channel One Russia, internally selected its entry for the contest. Russia was planned to compete in the first half of the second semifinal on 11 May 2017, until the announcement of their disqualification on 13 April 2017.

== Background ==
Prior to the 2017 contest, Russia had participated in the Eurovision Song Contest twenty times since its first entry in 1994. Russia had won the contest on one occasion in 2008 with the song "Believe" performed by Dima Bilan. Russia's least successful result has been 17th place, which they have achieved in the 1995 with the song "Kolybelnaya dlya vulkana" performed by Philipp Kirkorov. Following the introduction of semi-finals for the 2004, Russia has, to this point, managed to qualify to the final on every occasion. In 2015, Russia was the runner-up at the Eurovision Song Contest, placing second with the song "A Million Voices" performed by Polina Gagarina.

== Before Eurovision ==
=== Internal selection ===
The Russian entry for the Eurovision Song Contest 2017 was internally selected by an expert committee of C1R. Among acts rumoured by several Russian media sites to be considered by the broadcaster were Aleksandr Panayotov, Darya Antonyuk, Elena Temnikova (Note: Elena later stated that she is unable to take part in Eurovision due to the fact that she had "many concerts planned and had plans to record new songs and dance and acoustic albums"), Soprano Turetskovo, Nargiz Zakirova, Nyusha (Note: Later, Nyusha stated that she will not take part in Eurovision due to the fact that she is "busy") and Julia Samoylova, the latter was ultimately shortlisted along with Antonyuk. On 12 March 2017, Channel One announced that they had internally selected Julia Samoylova, with her song "Flame Is Burning" to represent them at the Eurovision Song Contest 2017. She was described as "an independent singer, an enchanting girl and a successful competition participant".

Shortlisted acts
Darya Antonyuk
Julia Samoylova

Song selection
| Songwriter(s) | Song |
|---|---|
| Leonid Gutkin | "Flame Is Burning" |
| Philipp Kirkorov and Dimitris Kontopoulos | Unknown |

=== Political issues and travel ban ===
On 13 March 2017, it was revealed that Ukrainian officials had begun an investigation into Samoylova, alleging that in 2015, she had illegally traveled directly to Crimea, a region that was annexed by Russia in 2014, to give a performance. Ukrainian legislation requires visitors to enter the region through points under the control of the Ukrainian government, or risk being banned from entering Ukraine for several years.

In response to these actions, it was speculated that Russia's choice of Samoylova may have been a deliberate political statement, having knowingly picked a singer who had performed in the disputed territory; interior minister advisor Anton Gerashchenko stated that he couldn't "exclude that actions could be taken by our side to deny her entry" if Russia was using the entry as a "provocation", while the deputy director of ATR, a Ukrainian television broadcaster that serves the Crimean Tatar population, argued that it was a "cynical and immoral move". Russia has denied that their choice of performer was meant to be a political statement.

On 22 March 2017, the Security Service of Ukraine (SBU) confirmed that Samoylova had been banned from entering Ukraine for three years for illegally travelling to Crimea. The EBU stated that it was continuing to ensure that all entrants would be able to perform in Kyiv, but that "we have to respect the local laws of the host country, however we are deeply disappointed in this decision as we feel it goes against both the spirit of the contest and the notion of inclusivity that lies at the heart of its values." On 23 March 2017, EBU offered a compromise to Channel One Russia, in which Samoylova would be allowed to perform remotely from a venue of the broadcaster's choice; it would have been the first time that a Eurovision entry had been performed from an outside venue via satellite.

== At Eurovision ==
The Eurovision Song Contest 2017 took place at the International Exhibition Centre in Kyiv, Ukraine and consisted of two semi-finals on 9 and 11 May and the final on 13 May 2017. According to Eurovision rules, all nations with the exceptions of the host country and the "Big Five" (France, Germany, Italy, Spain and the United Kingdom) are required to qualify from one of two semi-finals in order to compete for the final; the top ten countries from each semi-final progress to the final. The European Broadcasting Union (EBU) split up the competing countries into six different pots based on voting patterns from previous contests, with countries with favourable voting histories put into the same pot. In spite of the provisional ban, Russia were included in the running order, in the third slot, after Austria, and before Macedonia.

=== Withdrawal ===
On 13 April 2017, EBU stated that Russia will no longer be able to take part in this year’s competition. The Russian state broadcaster Channel One responded by stating that they will not broadcast the contest.
