= Cosmopolitan Life =

Studio album by Al Di Meola & Leonid Agutin
- Released: 2005
- Genre: Jazz
- Label: Ole Records

Cosmopolitan Life is an album by Russian singer and composer Leonid Agutin, featuring guitarist Al Di Meola, released in 2005. It has been released with different track listings by SPV and Ole.

After release of the album in 2005, Di Meola and Agutin performed together live in the United States (Blue Note), Russia, Switzerland (Montreux Jazz Festival), Italy ("Italiani nel Mondo"), and other countries.

== Track listing ==
All songs written by Leonid Agutin and Alex Sino.

1. "Cuba Africa" – 5:34
2. "Cosmopolitan Life" – 4:09
3. "Nobody" – 4:47
4. "Price to Learn" – 5:27
5. "Tango" – 3:54
6. "Smile" – 4:19
7. "Portofino" – 3:37
8. "If I'll Get a Chance" – 4:07
9. "Blue River" – 4:44
10. "Shade of Your World" – 6:16
