= Lolita Milyavskaya =

Ukrainian-Russian singer (born 1963)

Lolita
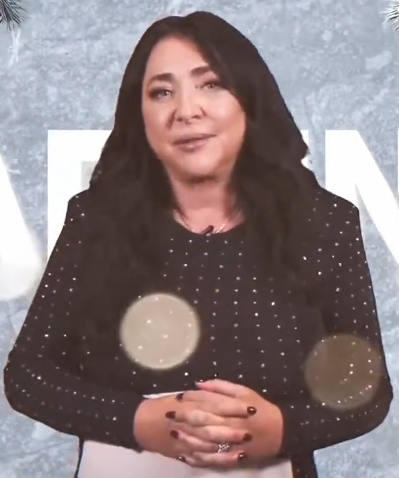
- Milyavskaya in 2018
- Born: Lolita Markovna Gorelik; 14 November 1963 (age 62); Mukachevo, Ukrainian SSR, Soviet Union
- Citizenship: Russian
- Education: Moscow State Art and Cultural University
- Occupations: Actress; singer; TV and film director
- Years active: 1987–present
- Spouses: Aleksandr Belyayev (m. 1985; div. 1986) Vitaly Milyavsky (m. 1986; div. 1987) Aleksandr Tsekalo (m. 1987; div. 1999) Aleksandr Zarubin (m. 2004; div. 2009) Dmitry Ivanov (m. 2011; div. 2019)
- Children: Eva Tsekalo (b.1999)
- Awards: TEFI

Lolita Markovna Milyavskaya (Russian: Лоли́та Ма́рковна Миля́вская, née Горелик (Gorelik); Ukrainian: Лоліта Марківна Мілявська; born 14 November 1963), known mononymously as Lolita, is a Russian singer, actress, TV and film director. She was born in Mukachevo, Zakarpattia Oblast, former Ukrainian SSR.

== Biography ==
Father - Mark L. Gorelik (1932-1978), an actor and stage director. Mother - Alla Dmitrievna Nikiforova (born 18 January 1943), graduated from Lviv Music College, was a jazz singer. After marrying, Lolita's parents moved to Kyiv. In 1981, Lolita applied to the Tambov branch of the Moscow State Institute of Culture. At the institute, Lolita met fellow student Alexander Belyaev, who later became her first husband. In 1985, she graduated from the institute. In 1984 she moved from Tambov to Odessa. She worked in the Odesa Philharmonic Theater, met Alexander Tsekalo there, and in 1987 left with him for Moscow. In order to register in Moscow, she entered into a fictitious marriage with Vitaly Milyavsky. They did not live together.

In 1985, Alexander Tsekalo and Lolita Milyavskaya created the pop group «Cabaret Duo Akademiya». In 1995, Milyavskaya and Tsekalo became presenters of the TV programme ‘Morning Mail’, and since 1997 they have hosted the programme ‘Good Morning, Country!’.

At the end of her marriage to Tsekalo in 1998, Lolita gave birth to a daughter Eva.

In the spring of 2000, Lolita began a solo career and released the song ‘Flowers’. In January 2001, the album of the same name was released.

In March 2003 she gave her first big solo concert - ‘Show divorced woman’.

In 2007, Lolita released the albums ‘Neformat’ and ‘Orientation North’.

In March 2016, Lolita released the song ‘On the Titanic’.

In 2017 Milyavskaya was forbidden to enter Ukraine for a term of three years because she performed in Crimea in 2015 (the Ukrainian territory Crimea was annexed by Russia in 2014). In January 2023, Ukraine imposed sanctions on Lolita for her support of the Russian invasion of Ukraine.

She attended the Almost Naked Party held in a Moscow nightclub in December 2023.

== Discography ==
=== as part of cabaret-duo "Akademiya" (with Aleksandr Tsekalo) ===
Year	Title	Note
1992/1995	"Маленький переворот" ("Maleńký perevorot"; "Little Coup")	released in 1992 as vinyl and 1995 as CD
1994	"Небальные танцы" ("Nebaĺnýe tancy"; "Non-ballroom dances")	
1995	"Хочешь, но молчишь" ("Hočeš', no molčiš'"; "You want, but don't say anything")	
1997	"Свадьба" ("Svad'ba"; "Wedding")	
1998	"Отпечатки пальчиков" ("Otpečatki paĺčikov"; "Fingerprints")	
1999	"Ту-Ту-Ту, На-На-На"	

=== Studio albums ===
Year	Title	Note
2000	"Цветочки" ("Cvetočki"; "Flowers")	
2003	"Шоу разведённой женщины " ("Šou razvedönnoj ženśiny"; "Show divorced woman")	
2005	"Формат" ("Format")	
2007	"Неформат" ("Neformat"; "Unformat")	
2007	"Ориентация Север" ("Orientacija Sever"; "Orientation North")	
2008	"Фетиш" ("Fetish")	
2014	"Анатомия" ("Anatomija"; "Anatomy")	
2018	"Раневская" ("Ranevskaja")	

=== EPs ===
Year	Title	Note
2015	"Неизданное" ("Neizdannoe"; "Unreleased")	

=== DVD-Albums ===
Year	Title	Note
2005	"Шоу разведённой женщины" ("Šou razvedönnoj ženśiny"; "The show of the divorced woman")	
2007	"Мне 41… А кто даст?" ("Mne 41… A kto dast?"; "I'm 41 ... And who will give?")	

=== Collections ===
Year	Title	Note
2009	"Запавшее" ("Zapavšeje"; "Stalled")	
2010	"Grand Collection"	

=== Soundtracks ===
Year	Title	Album	Type
2004	dubbed 3 songs	Home on the Range: An Original Walt Disney Records Soundtrack	animated movie
2005	"Приговорённая к любви" ("Prigovorönnaja k lübvi"; "Sentenced to love")	Popsa	drama film
2007	"Две любви (duet with Aleksandr Marshal)" ("Dve lübvi"; "Two love")	Татьянин день ("Tatjanin deń"; "Tatyana's Day")	telenovela
2009	"Остановите Землю" ("Ostanovite Zemlü"; "Stop the Earth")	Jolly Fellows	comedy-drama film

=== Charted singles ===
Title	Year	Peak chart positions						Album
Title	Year	RUS Air.	CIS Air.	EST Air.	LAT Air.	LAT Stream.	MDA Air.	Album
"Po-drugomu" (with Kosta Lakosta)	2021	50	79	—	63	*	*	I etim vse skazano
"Grustnaya tantsuyu"	2022	44	68	182	—	*	15	I etim vse skazano
"Na titanike" (with Instasamka)	2023	—	—	—	59	13	—	Non-album singles
"Offset'"	2024	—	—	157	—	—	—	Non-album singles
"Yesh', lyubi i molis'"	2024	88	161	—	63	—	—	Non-album singles
"Krasnaya shapochka"	2026	—	—	—	—	—	63	Non-album singles
"Zhurnalistka" (with Mavik)	2026	—	—	—	27	—	—	Non-album singles
"—" denotes a recording that did not chart or was not released in that territory. "*" denotes that the chart did not exist at that time.

== Videography ==
Year	Music Video	Director	Album
as part of "Akademiya"
1992	"Тома" ("Toma"; "Tammy")	—N/a	Маленький переворот
1992	"Венеция" ("Venetsiya"; "Venice")	М. Иванников (M. Ivannikov)	Маленький переворот
1994	"Баден-Баден" ("Baden Baden")	Ю. Грымов (Yu. Grymov)	Небальные танцы
1995	"Хочешь, но молчишь" ("Khochesh', no molchish'"; "If you want, but don't say anything")	—N/a	Хочешь, но молчишь
1995	"Догги" ("Doggi"; "Doggy")	—N/a	Хочешь, но молчишь
1995	"За пивом" ("Za pivom"; "Out for a beer")	—N/a	Хочешь, но молчишь
1997	"Я обиделась" ("YA obidelas'"; "I'm offended")	—N/a	Свадьба
1998	"Moscau"	—N/a	Ту-ту-ту на-на-на
1998	"Ту-ту-ту"	—N/a	Ту-ту-ту на-на-на
1999	"Маленький" ("Malen'kiy"; "Little")	—N/a	Ту-ту-ту на-на-на
as lead artist
1995	"Гондурас (with Arkady Arkanov)" ("Gonduras"; "Honduras")	—N/a	—N/a
2000	"Песня о женской дружбе (with Alyona Apina)" ("Pesnya o zhenskoy druzhbe"; "The song about female friendship")	Сергей Баженов (Sergey Bazhenov)	Цветочки
2000	"Цветочки" ("Tsvetochki"; "Flowers")	Александр Кальварский (Alexander Kalvarsky)	Цветочки
2001	Отвали ("Otvali"; "Fuck off")	Александр Кальварский (Alexander Kalvarsky)	Шоу разведённой женщины
2001	"Пропащая" ("Propashchaya"; "Missing")	—N/a	—N/a
2002	"Музыка тела" ("Muzyka tela"; "Music of the body")	Александр Кальварский (Alexander Kalvarsky)	Шоу разведённой женщины
2003	"Помада" ("Pomada"; "Pomade")	Олег Гусев (Oleg Gusev)	Формат
2004	"Мачо" ("Macho")	Олег Гусев (Oleg Gusev)	Формат
2009	"Остановите Землю" ("Ostanovite Zemlyu"; "Stop the Earth")	Феликс Михайлов (Felix Mikhailov)	Неизданное / Soundtrack of "Весельчаки" ("Vesel'chaki"; "Merry Men")
2010	"Иди и смотри (with NucKids)" ("Idi i smotri"; "Go and See")	Юлиана Донская (Yuliana Donskaya)	—N/a
2011	"Часы" ("Chasy"; "Clock")	Aslan Ahmadov	Неизданное
2011	"Ты похудела (with Quest Pistols)" ("Ty pokhudela"; "You lost weight")	Юрий Бардаш (Yuri Bardash)	—N/a
2014	"Анатомия" ("Anatomiya"; "Anatomy")	Aslan Ahmadov	Анатомия
2014	"На скотч" ("Na skotch"; "On scotch tape")	Елена Кипер (Yelena Kiper)	Анатомия
2015	"Шпилька-каблучок" ("Shpylʹka-kabluchok"; "Stiletto Heel")	Коля Серга (Kolya Serga)	Анатомия
2015	"Территория сердца (with Денисом Майдановым)" ("Territoriya serdtsa"; "Territory of the Heart"; with Denisom Maydanovym)	Елена Кипер, Вадим Шатров (Yelena Kiper, Vadim Shatrov)	Неизданное
2016	"Анатомия (with N’Pans & L.A.V.Retro)" ("Anatomiya"; "Anatomy")	Иван Колпаков (Ivan Kolpakov)	—N/a
2016	"На Титанике" ("Na Titanike"; "On the Titanic")	Леонид Колосовский (Leonid Kolosovskiy)	Раневская
2017	"Ты моё море (Dj Antonio Remix)" ("Ty moyo more"; "You are my sea")	Дмитрий Иванов (Dmitriy Ivanov)	Раневская
2017	"Ты моё море" ("Ty moyo more"; "You are my sea")	Дмитрий Иванов (Dmitriy Ivanov)	Раневская
2018	"Раневская" ("Ranevskaya")	Тина Баркалая (Tina Barkalaya)	Раневская
2018	"Судьба" ("Sud'ba"; "Fate")	Тина Баркалая (Tina Barkalaya)	Раневская

== Filmography ==
=== Movies ===
Year	Title	Role
1991	" Тень, или Может быть, всё обойдётся — курортница" ("Ten', ili Mozhet byt', vso oboydotsya"; "Shadow, or Maybe everything will do")	health resort
1996	"Короли российского сыска" ("Koroli rossiyskogo syska"; "Kings of the Russian Investigation")	
1996	"Умереть от счастья и любви" ("Umeret' ot schast'ya i lyubvi"; "Die from happiness and love")	
2001	"Вечера на хуторе близ Диканьки" ("Vechera na khutore bliz Dikan'ki"; Evenings on a farm near Dikanka)	Солоха (Solokha)
2002	"Cinderella"	Stepmother
2003	"The Crazy Day or The Marriage of Figaro"	Countess Rosine
2005	"Popsa" ("Neformat"; "Unformat")	Irina Pepelyaeva ("Pippi"), an eccentric singer
2005	"Это всё цветочки…" ("Eto vso tsvetochki…"; "It's all flowers ...")	
2007	"Kingdom of Crooked Mirrors"	Queen Anidag / participant from France
2007	"Кровавая Мэри" ("Krovavaya Meri"; "Blood Mary")	
2007	"Татьянин день" ("Tat'yanin den'"; "Tatyana's Day")	cameo on telenovela
2008	"Золотая рыбка" ("Zolotaya rybka"; "Goldfish")	teacher of good manners
2010	"Морозко" ("ˈfrôstē"; "Frosty")	cameo
2011	"Новые приключения Аладдина" ("Novyye priklyucheniya Aladdina"; "The New Adventures of Aladdin")	atamans of robbers
2012	"Петрович" ("Petrovich")	Виктория Ланская (Victoria Lanskaya)
2012	"Красная Шапочка" ("Krasnaya Shapochka"; "Little Red Riding Hood")	mother of Little Red Riding Hood

=== Television ===
Year	Title	Role
1995	"1995 — Кабаре «Маски-Шоу»" ("Kabare «Maski-Shou»"; "The Mask-Show Cabaret")	as part of Akademiya
1996	"Шоу долгоносиков" ("Shou dolgonosikov"; "Show weevils")	
1997	"Старые песни о главном-3" ("Vechera na khutore bliz Dikan'ki"; "Old songs about the main-3")	the German ambassador (the song "Moskau" with Aleksandr Tsekalo)
2000	"Старые песни о главном. Постскриптум" ("Shou dolgonosikov"; "Old songs about the main thing. Postscript.")	"Felicita" duet with Oleg Gazmanov)
