= Fetish (Lolita Milyavskaya album) =

- Original album cover

Studio album by Lolita Milyavskaya
- Released: 14 November 2008
- Recorded: 2008
- Studio: Lopatin Sound Lab
- Genre: Pop
- Length: 43:20
- Language: Russian
- Label: Sky Music
- Producer: Anatoly Lopatin

Lolita Milyavskaya chronology
Orienttsiya sever (2007)	Fetish (2008)	Anatomiya (2014)

Singles from Fetish
- 1. "Proshchay, oruzhiye!" Released: 24 September 2008; 2. "M.M.T." Released: 2 March 2009; 3. "Rasskazhi, kak..." Released: 14 May 2009

Fetish (Russian: Фетиш) is the sixth studio album by Russian singer Lolita Milyavskaya, released on 14 November 2008 by Sky Music.

== Overview ==
Prior to the release of the album, Lolita's representative stated that the album would be extremely edgy, more fashionable and somewhat similar to Kylie Minogue's latest album X (2007). All arrangements were made by the album's producer Anatoly Lopatin. The album includes twelve songs, including the track "Rasskazhi, kak...", which became a top-20 hit in Russia and Ukraine.

Censorship did not miss the singer's work for sale because of an erotic photo shoot made specifically for the album. In the images, Lolita, surrounded by naked strippers, appeared in the image of a burlesque show dancer: she was wearing a black corset with a revealing neckline, mesh tights, leather boots and a police hat. Due to the restrictions imposed, Lolita released a special edition of the disc with a censored cover, and only a few music stores in Moscow sold the album with the original cover.

In support of the album, Lolita went on a tour called One Big Long Song about..., which began on 30 November 2008.

== Critical reception ==
Overall, the album received mixed reviews from critics. They praised the singer for the modern sound, creative research in the lyrics of Yelena Kiper's songs. Zhenya Voevodina from Billboard Russia wrote that "if you close your eyes to the "Soviet circus" of the PR campaign of the new release "Fetish", then there will be a sample of modern Russian pop music, which various "Russian radio" will be happy to put on the air. She also compared Fetish to the Madonna's album Erotica (1992). Sergey Sosedov also wrote that "the new album by one of the most talented and scandalous singers in Russia is our answer to Madonna. Even on the cover, Lola appeared in the image of "brunette" Marilyn Monroe, a film star who, as you know, became the image forerunner of Madonna".

== Track listing ==
Fetish track listing
No.	Title	Writer(s)	Length
1.	"Proshchay, oruzhiye!"	Yelena Kiper	4:02
2.	"Nikto ne vinovat"	Kiper; Aleksandr Muratovsky	3:05
3.	"Fetish"	Oleg Borshchevsky	3:57
4.	"M.M.T."	Sergey Guanin; Kiper	3:46
5.	"Rasskazhi, kak..."	Konstantin Legostayev	3:45
6.	"Bely flag"	Guanin	4:04
7.	"Ostalas nadezhda"	Kiper; Yuliya Osina	3:43
8.	"Zatsepi menya tak"	Borshchevsky	3:43
9.	"Nu chto zh..."	Valentina Smirnova	3:34
10.	"Ne kuri"	Smirnova	2:54
11.	"Proshchay, oruzhiye!" (War Style radio mix)	Kiper	3:29
12.	"Rasskazhi, kak..." (Tradition mix)	Legostayev	3:13
Total length:			43:20

== Personnel ==
- Lolita Milyavskaya – vocal
- Oleg Olenev – arrangement, programming (1, 4, 5, 8, 11)
- Oleg Shaumarov – arrangement, programming (2, 3, 6, 7, 10)
- Anatoly Lopatin – arrangement, programming (5, 8, 11, 12)
- Sergey Rzumov – arrangement, programming, bass guitar, guitar (9)
- Natalya Sigayeva – backing vocals (1, 2, 4, 5, 7–9)
- Ilmira Tinchurina – cello (3)
- Alexey Batychenko – conducting, wind instruments (9)
- Konstantin Gorshkov – wind instruments (9)
- Aleksandr Michurin – wind instruments (9)

Credits are adapted from the album's liner notes.
