= 2014 Winter Paralympics opening ceremony =

- Part of 2014 Winter Paralympics
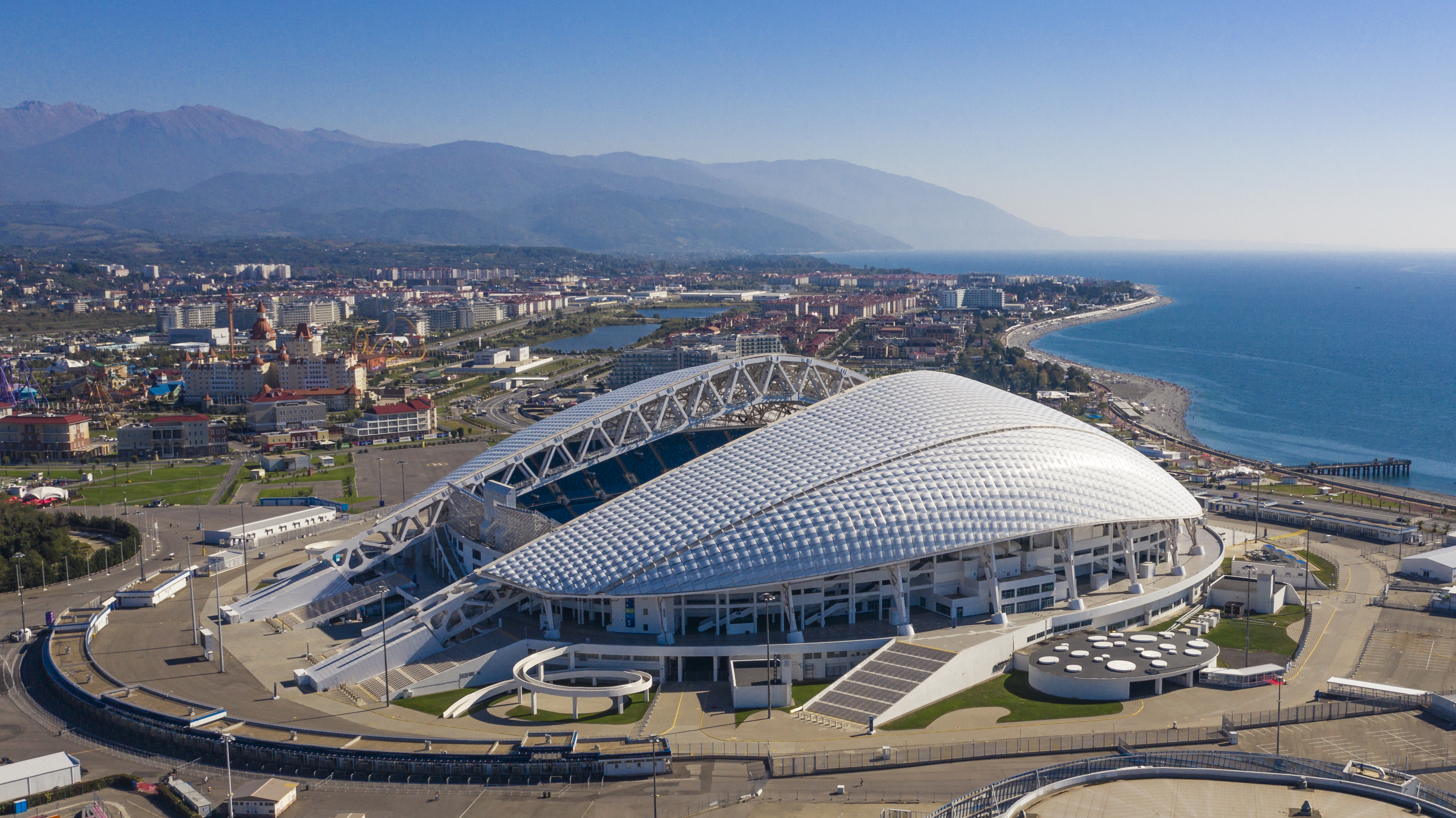
- Fisht Olympic Stadium hosted the opening ceremony.
- Date: 7 March 2014
- Venue: Fisht Olympic Stadium
- Location: Sochi, Russia
- Also known as: Breaking the Ice
- Filmed by: Olympic Broadcasting Services (OBS)

The opening ceremony of the 2014 Winter Paralympics took place at the Fisht Olympic Stadium in Sochi, Russia, on 7 March 2014. It began at 20:14 MSK (UTC+4) to match the time to the year.

== Ceremony ==
The opening ceremony was titled "Breaking the Ice" and centered on breaking down barriers and celebrating Russian culture. It opened with a rhythmic dance featuring 126 performers dressed in the colors of the Russian flag. Russian dance and music were featured throughout, as performances were interspersed with animated segments featuring drawings of the firebird, a staple of Russian mythology, by Alexander Petrov. Tchaikovsky's "Sugar Plum Fairy" and an homage to ice fishing were among the performances. Many of the show's 2500 performers were disabled, including singer Yuliya Samoylova who led the choir in a performance of "Together".

During the March of Nations, athletes entered from a central ramp, just as in the opening ceremony of the 2014 Winter Olympics. Soviet-era rock music played as the nations alphabetically (in the Russian alphabet) paraded through a "forest" of 204 light poles. Ukraine was represented by a single athlete carrying their flag to represent the 23-person team in an apparent protest to the annexation of Ukrainian Crimea by Russia. Carrying the flag, biathlete Mykhaylo Tkachenko drew a loud applause as he entered the stadium. As the host nation, Russia entered last to the tune of the 1988 song "The Last Letter" by the famous rock band Nautilus Pompilius. The song is better known as "Goodbye America" in Russia, reflecting a famous line from the song: "Good-bye, America that I will never see. Will I hear your song that I will always remember?" The final segment of the performance featured a number based on the plays of Anton Chekhov and stage singer Maria Guleghina singing a song based on the poetry of Mikhail Lermontov while riding an ice-breaking ship named Mir (Peace).

During his speech at the opening ceremony International Paralympic Committee president Philip Craven noted that Russia had declined to host the 1980 Paralympics in conjunction with the 1980 Summer Olympics, making this the first time Russia has hosted the games. He called on spectators to have "barrier-free mind" just as "the city of Sochi has built a barrier-free environment for athletes and officials to enjoy". Russian President Vladimir Putin declared the games open, drawing loud cheers. Russian Paralympians Olesya Vladykina and Sergey Shilov shared the honor of lighting the Paralympic torch. The opening ceremony ended with a video that spoke out against discrimination.

== Anthems ==
- Pan-Russian Choir – Russian national anthem
- London Philharmonic Orchestra – Paralympic anthem
