= Yuliya Samoylova (singer) =

Russian singer (born 1989)

Yuliya Samoylova Юлия Самойлова
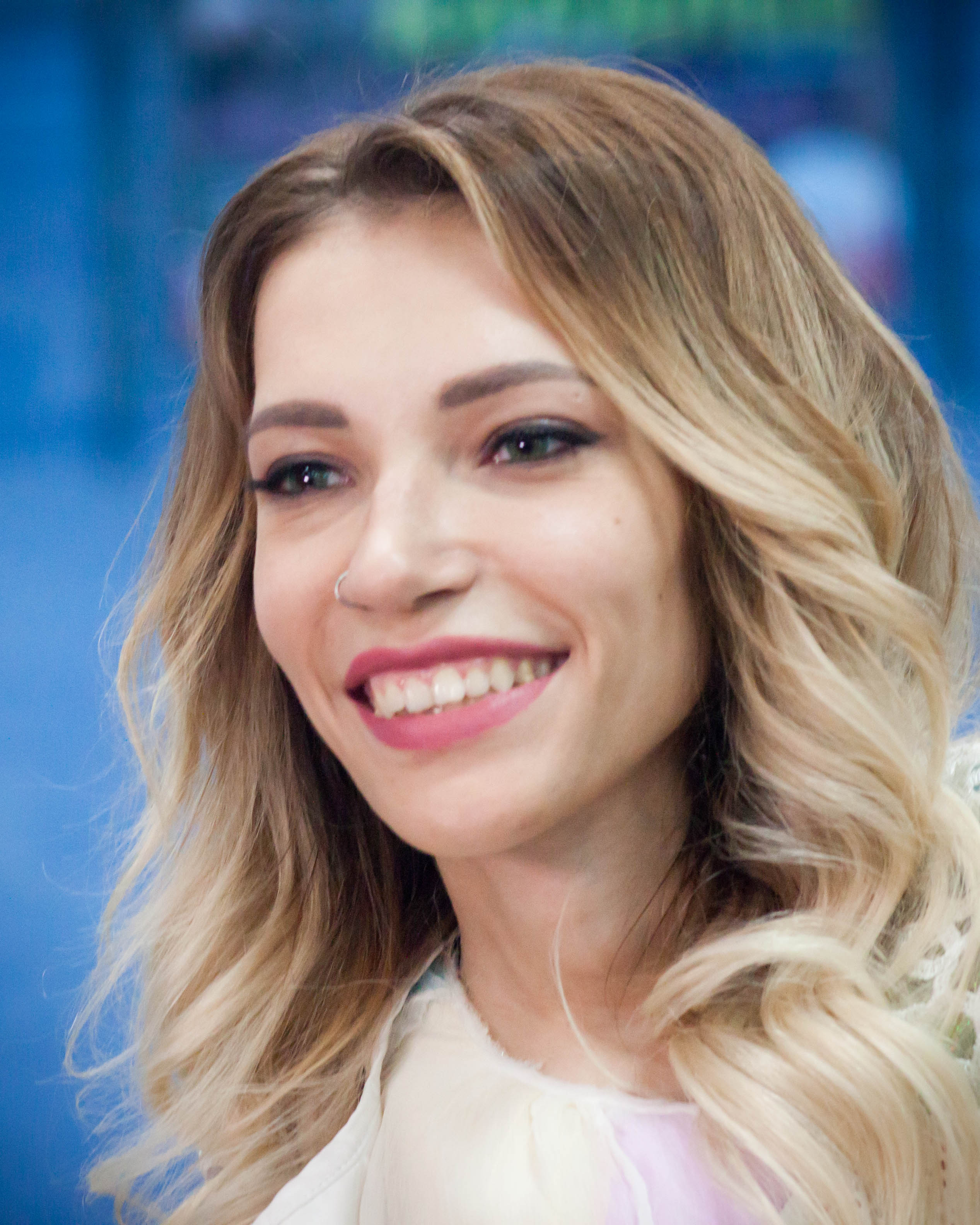
- Samoylova in 2018

Background information
- Also known as: Yulia Samoilova; Julia Samoylova
- Born: Julia Olegovna Samoilova; 7 October 1989 (age 36); Ukhta, Komi ASSR, Russian SFSR, USSR
- Genres: Pop, rock
- Occupation: Singer
- Instrument: Vocals
- Years active: 2013–present

Julia Olegovna Samoilova (Russian: Ю́лия Оле́говна Само́йлова, IPA: [ˈjʉlʲɪjə ɐˈlʲeɡəvnə sɐˈmojləvə]; born 7 October 1989), sometimes credited as Yulia Samoilova or Julia Samoylova, is a Russian singer-songwriter. In early 2017, she was selected to represent Russia in the 2017 edition of the Eurovision Song Contest with the song "Flame Is Burning", but was subsequently banned from the contest's host country, Ukraine, due to violating Ukrainian law by entering Crimea through Russia in 2015, shortly after the region was annexed by Russia. In response to the ban, Russia ultimately withdrew from the contest. The following year, Samoylova was instead chosen to represent her country in the 2018 edition of the contest in Portugal. Performing "I Won't Break", she placed 15th out of 18 contestants in the second semi-final, failing to qualify for the grand final. "I Won't Break" was the first Russian entry not to reach the final since the introduction of semi-finals in 2004.

== Early life ==
Yuliya was born in Ukhta, Komi ASSR, Russian SFSR, USSR. As a child, Samoylova began losing function of her legs due to spinal muscular atrophy and has used a wheelchair since childhood. The singer says that the manifestation of the hereditary disease could follow after an unsuccessful poliomyelitis vaccination (Channel One and TASS also take this view), but specialists deny such a connection. Samoylova started her career performing for oil workers at a restaurant in her hometown of Ukhta. In 2008, she founded the band "TerraNova" which played heavy alternative music. TerraNova disintegrated in 2010.

== Music career ==
=== 2013–14: Faktor A and Winter Paralympics ===
In 2013, Samoylova was the runner-up of season three of Faktor A, the Russian version of The X Factor. The following year, she also took part in the opening ceremony of the 2014 Winter Paralympics.

=== 2017–present: Eurovision Song Contest ===
Samoylova was selected on 12 March 2017 to represent Russia in the Eurovision Song Contest 2017 held in the capital of Ukraine, Kyiv, with the song "Flame Is Burning". On 13 March, the Security Service of Ukraine announced that they might ban her from entering Ukraine due to her 2015 visit to Crimea – a region that was annexed by Russia in 2014. According to Ukrainian law entering Crimea via Russia is illegal. Samoylova has stated that she did perform in Crimea in 2015. On 22 March, the Security Service of Ukraine banned Samoylova from entering Ukraine for three years for her violation of Ukrainian legislation

State broadcaster Russia-1 announced on 13 April their withdrawal from the contest, which meant Samoylova would not participate in Eurovision 2017. It had been previously announced that, if Samoylova was unable to take part in 2017, she would be selected to represent Russia in 2018. Samoilova instead performed in Sevastopol, Crimea, on the day of the Eurovision semi-final.

On 29 January 2018, it was confirmed by Channel 1 Russia that she would return to represent Russia at the Eurovision Song Contest 2018 in Lisbon, Portugal.

On 11 March, it was revealed that the song Yulia was to sing at the Eurovision Song Contest 2018 would be "I Won't Break"

On 10 May, she performed in the second Semi-Final of the contest, but failed to qualify for the Grand Final. She is the first Russian entry to fail to qualify since the introduction of televised qualifying rounds in 2004.

== Discography ==
=== Singles ===
Title	Year	Album
"Flame Is Burning"	2017	Non-album singles
"Yad" (Poison)	2017	Non-album singles
"I Won't Break"	2018	Non-album singles

Awards and achievements
Preceded by Sergey Lazarev with "You Are the Only One"	Russia in the Eurovision Song Contest; 2018	Succeeded by Sergey Lazarev with "Scream"
