= Instasamka =

Russian singer (born 2000)

- Инстасамка
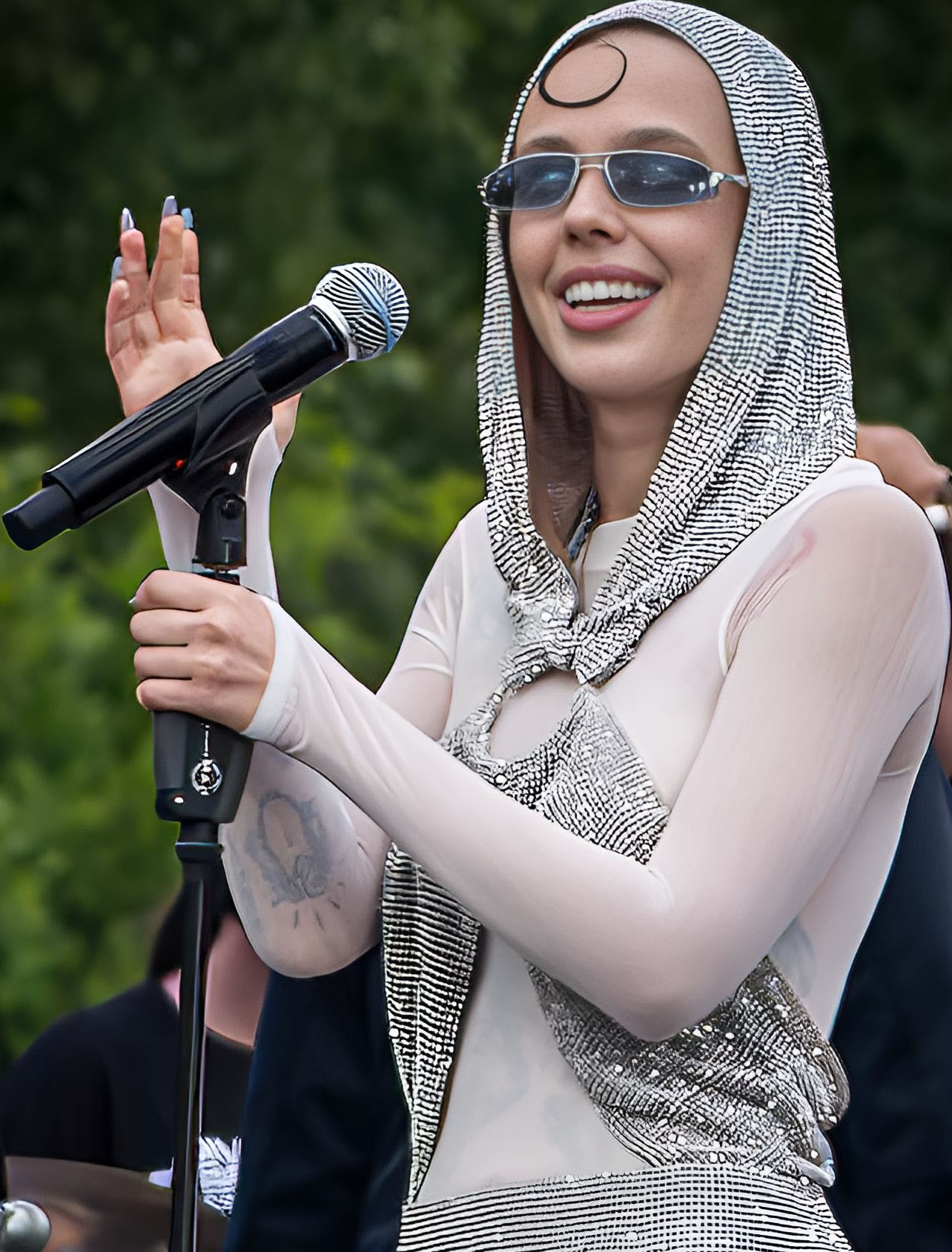
- Instasamka at VK Fest in 2023
- Born: Darya Yevgenyevna Zoteyeva (Eropkina); 11 May 2000 (age 26); Tobolsk, Russia
- Occupations: Singer; rapper
- Years active: 2017–present
- Musical career
- Genre: Pop rap
- Instrument: Vocals
- Labels: NaMneCash Music; Gamma Music; Rocket Records
- Website: instasamka.ru

Darya Yevgenyevna Yeropkina (Russian: Дарья Евгеньевна Еропкина, née Zoteyeva (Note: Until March 12, 2025.) (Зотеева); born 11 May 2000), known professionally as Instasamka (Инстасамка; Instagram + 'female'), is a Russian singer and rapper, TikToker; formerly an Instagram blogger.

== Early life ==
Darya Yevgenyevna Zoteyeva was born on 11 May 2000 in Tobolsk. She was expelled from school in the ninth grade for unknown reasons. Zoteyeva's academic journey continued as she graduated from school and entered a local technical school with the aim of becoming an economist. Subsequently, she pursued studies at MSUA, however she was expelled due to low attendance.

She spent much of her youth in Chekhov and after the start of her creative career she moved to Moscow.

== Career ==
She started her career in 2017 with an Instagram blog under the pseudonym "Prezidentsha" (Президентша).

She is known for her provocative image, actions and content, often creating hype in the information space of the Runet. She became widely known for this for the first time in 2019, according to its results, she entered the list of the most popular girls in Russia according to Google. In addition, Zoteyeva's music in the rap genre is included in the annual ratings of the publications RBK Style and The Flow for 2021, and when Instasamka changed the vector of creative development, starting to perform music in the pop style, by the end of 2022 she became one of the main stars of this genre in Russia according to Meduza.

Since 2021, complaints have been filed against her to the authorities, emphasizing that she popularizes the life style incompatible with the "traditional life values". The complaints intensified after 2023, and several Zoteyeva's concerts were canceled by the authorities. As a result, she started to collaborate with the authorities and to file complaints against other singers.

== Personal life ==
Since mid-2019, she has been in close relationship with Oleg Eropkin, better known under his stage name MONEYKEN, who also produces and features in a majority of her music. According to an interview with 5TV in November 2020, they had been officially married for six months.

Zoteyeva was added to the Ukrainian Myrotvorets database after false information circulated online that she donated her savings to the Russian army.

== Discography ==
=== Studio albums ===
- Born to Flex (2019)
- Tripl malysh (2019)
- Mamacita (2020)
- Spasibo Papasha (2020)
- Semeyny biznes (2020)
- Queen of Rap (2022)

=== Remix albums ===
- Sped Up Album (2023)

=== Charted studio albums ===
List of charted studio albums, with selected details
Title	Details	Peak chart positions	
Title	Details	LAT	LTU
Moneydealer	Released: 16 November 2021; Label: NaMneCash Music; Format: Digital download, streaming	*	80
Popstar	Released: 16 December 2022; Label: NaMneCash Music; Format: Digital download, streaming	1	5
"—" denotes a recording that did not chart or was not released in that territory. "*" denotes the chart did not exist at that time.

=== Charted singles ===
List of charted singles as lead artist, showing album name and year released
Title	Year	Peak chart positions					Album or EP
Title	Year	RUS Stream.	IND Int.	LAT Air.	LAT Stream.	LTU	Album or EP
"Popstar"	2022	*	—	—	—	65	Popstar
"Za dengi da"	2022	*	—	165	1	11	Popstar
"Otklyuchayu telefon"	2023	*	9	—	—	—	Non-album singles
"Zhara"	2023	*	—	193	—	—	Non-album singles
"Na Titanike" (with Lolita)	2023	*	—	59	13	—	Non-album singles
"Grustnyy dens"	2024	*	—	50	—	—	Non-album singles
"Moy marmeladny"	2024	*	—	100	—	—	Non-album singles
"Boss"	2025	97	—	—	—	—	Non-album singles
"Agent Girl"	2025	62	—	—	—	—	Non-album singles
"Personality"	2026	67	—	—	—	—	Non-album singles
"Everest"	2026	40	—	—	—	—	Non-album singles
"—" denotes a recording that did not chart or was not released in that territory. "*" denotes the chart did not exist at that time.

=== Other charted songs ===
List of other charted songs as lead artist, showing album name and year released
Title	Year	Peak chart positions		Album or EP
Title	Year	LAT Air.	LTU	Album or EP
"Sto raz"	2022	9	—	Popstar
"Kak Mommy"	2022	152	12	Popstar
"—" denotes a recording that did not chart or was not released in that territory.
