= Maria Guleghina =

Soviet-born operatic soprano singer

- Марія Гулегіна
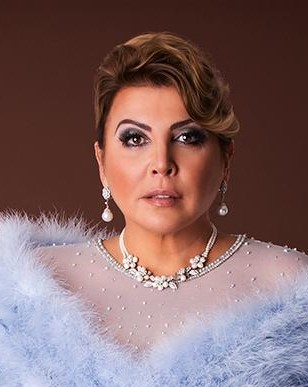
- Guleghina in 2013
- Born: Maria Meytardjan; 9 August 1959 (age 67); Odesa, Ukrainian SSR
- Citizenship: Belarusian; Luxembourgian
- Occupation: Operatic soprano
- Years active: 1985–present
- Website: www.mariaguleghina.com

Maria Agasovna Guleghina (Note: Ukrainian: Марія Агасівна Гулегіна, romanized: Mariia Ahasivna Hulehina; Armenian: Մարիա Աղասու Գուլեգինա, romanized: Maria Aghasu Gulegina; Belarusian: Mapыя Aгacаўнa Гулeгінa; Russian: Mapия Aгacoвнa Гулeгинa) (née Meytardjan (Russian: Мейтарджян); born 9 August 1959) is a Soviet-born operatic soprano singer, particularly associated with the Italian repertory.

== Biography ==
Maria Guleghina was born in Odesa, Ukrainian SSR, to an Armenian father and a Ukrainian mother, where she studied voice at the Music Conservatory with Evgeny Nikolaevich Ivanov (under whose tutorship she remained even after graduation). Guleghina is a citizen of Luxembourg where she resides with her family.

== Career ==
Guleghina made her stage debut in 1985 as Yolantha at the State Opera in Minsk (Belarus) shortly before leaving USSR to pursue an international career.

Her international debut came in 1987 as Amelia (opposite Luciano Pavarotti's Riccardo) in a production of Un ballo in maschera at La Scala. Leading roles in I due Foscari, Manon Lescaut, and Tosca followed, and soon she was engaged to perform in Vienna, Munich, Hamburg, London, and other major European opera houses. She made her debut at the Paris Opera in 1995, in the killer-role of Abigaille in Nabucco.

Her American debut took place at the Metropolitan Opera in January 1991, where she sang Maddalena in Andrea Chénier. She has also appeared at the San Francisco Opera and the Lyric Opera of Chicago, adding the lead soprano roles in works such as Ernani, Simon Boccanegra, Cavalleria rusticana, Fedora. She later added other demanding roles such as Odabella in Attila (opera) and Lady Macbeth in Macbeth (opera), to her ever-growing repertoire. She also debuted at Mariinsky Theatre in St. Petersburg, Russia in 1992 as Lisa in Tchaikovsky's The Queen of Spades.

Guleghina has also performed in Japan many times (twice as a part of La Scala's tours of Japan) and has a fan base there. She is considered by most as one of the leading dramatic sopranos of her generation. She is largely admired for her warm and rich voice, strong stage presence, and absolute dramatic commitment to her roles on the stage. She sang the opening aria (Aida) at the official opening of the new Oslo Opera House. Throughout November 2009, she starred as Turandot in the opera Turandot at the Met in New York. She represented Russia by singing during the closing ceremony of the 2010 Winter Olympics in Vancouver during the handover of the Olympic flag. Guleghina also participated of the Opening Ceremonies of the 2014 Winter Paralympics, singing "Cossack Lullaby" on top of an icebreaker that carried her though the stadium.

After a 10 year absence Gulegina returned to the Royal Opera House (Covent Garden) to perform Tosca (February, 2016). She also returned to Moscow’s Bolshoi Theatre as Eboli in Verdi’s epic Don Carlos.

In 2017, she appeared as Puccini's Turandot at the Metropolitan Opera and same year appeared in Verdi's Nabucco in a role of Abigaille.

In 2018, she made her Wagner debut as Kundry in Parsifal at the Mariinsky Theatre under Valery Gergiev. In 2019 she repeated the role in Sofia National Opera under Constantin Trinks' direction.

Guleghina performed in over 160 performances at the Metropolitan Opera in New York and has performed leading roles in 15 different opera productions at Teatro alla Scala where she also had two solo recitals.

Guleghina has received numerous prizes and awards.

== Charitable work ==
She is a member of the Honorary Board of the International Paralympic Committee as well as a UNICEF Goodwill Ambassador. She sang during the Closing Ceremony of the Vancouver Winter Olympics in 2010 as well as at the 2014 Winter Paralympics opening ceremony.

== Sources ==
- Mancini, R.; Rouveroux, J. (1995). Le guide de l'opéra, les indispensables de la musique. Fayard. ISBN 2-213-59567-4.
