= Aleksandr Panayotov =

Russian-Ukrainian singer (born 1984)

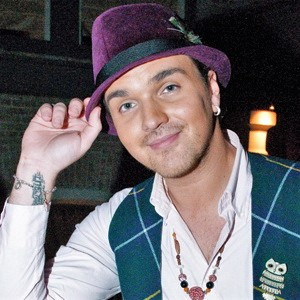
- Aleksandr Panayotov in 2014.

Background information
- Born: 1 July 1984 (age 42); Zaporizhzhia, Ukrainian SSR, Soviet Union (now Ukraine)
- Genres: Pop, dance, electropop, lounge music, R&B
- Occupations: Singer, songwriter
- Instrument: Vocals
- Label: Rodina Records
- Website: www.panaiotov.ru

Aleksandr Sergeyevich Panayotov (Russian: Александр Серге́евич Панайотов; born 1 July 1984) is a Russian-Ukrainian singer and songwriter. He has recorded two albums so far. In January 2023, Ukraine imposed sanctions on Aleksandr for his support of 2022 Russian invasion of Ukraine.

== Eurovision Song Contest ==
Aleksandr had made eleven previous attempts to represent Russia or Ukraine so far

=== Russia ===
- 2005: Balalayka (with Alexey Chumakov) – 5th (11.6% of televoting)
- 2006: Didn't qualify to the first round (Note: The name of the song that Aleksandr sent to Channel One is unknown)
- 2007: Не моя (Every Little Thing) (with Alexey Chumakov) – 2nd
- 2008: Crescent and Cross – 2nd (52 points)
- 2009: Superhero – Didn't qualify to the national final
- 2010: Maya Showtime – 6th (10.6 points)
- 2017: ~~Aleksandr was shortlisted~~ (Note: On 21 February 2017, Alexander Panayotov's manager, Ekaterina, hinted at a live broadcast on the Instagram that Channel One had stopped considering Alexander's candidacy for a trip to Kyiv from Russia. It is not known why Channel One had stopped considering Alexander's candidacy)
- 2019: Aleksandr was shortlisted
- 2020: Aleksandr was shortlisted – 3rd
- 2021: ~~Aleksandr was shortlisted~~ (Note: Aleksandr said that "There was an offer from Channel One, in fact, we sent them songs, and not just one – different genres, and slow, and fast, but in the end … the bosses think. They have their own vision and their own plans" This means that the reason for non-participation was that Channel One have asked Aleksandr to send several songs for consideration and the selection committee after listening to the songs decided not give Aleksandr the right to participate.)

=== Ukraine ===
- 2009: Superhero – 4th (22 points)

== The Voice of Russia 2016 ==
The Voice performances
– Studio version of song reached the top performances that week

Stage	Song	Original artist	Date	Order	Result
Blind Audition	"All by Myself"	Eric Carmen	23 September 2016	4.8	All coaches turned; joined Team Grigory Leps
Battle Rounds (Top 57)	"Woman in Chains" (vs. Elena Alekseeva)	Tears for Fears feat. Oleta Adams	11 November 2016	11.2	Saved by Coach
Knockout Rounds (Top 36)	"Everytime You Go Away" (vs. Daria Stavrovich, vs. Sergey Ruchkin)	Paul Young	2 December 2016	14.4	Saved by Coach
Live Quarterfinals (Top 24)	"Зачем тебе я"	Natalia Pavlova	16 December 2016	16.8	Saved by Votes Summa
Live Semi-final (Top 8)	"Не тревожь мне душу, скрипка"	Valeriy Meladze	23 December 2016	17.8	Saved by Votes Summa
Live Final (Top 4)	"Я слушал дождь" (with Grigory Leps)	Yevgeny Borisovich	30 December 2016	18.3	Runner-up
Live Final (Top 4)	"Исповедь"	Aleksey Garnizov	30 December 2016	18.7	Runner-up
Live Final (Top 4)	"Careless Whisper"	George Michael	30 December 2016	18.10	Runner-up

== Awards ==
- 2003 – Received prize "Красная книга Запорожья (Redlist of Zaporizhzhia)"
- 2006 – Received gold medal "Во имя жизни на земле (In name of life on land)" (Moscow)
- 2007 – Received Order "Служение искусству (Merit for art)" (Moscow)
- 2010 – Received Order "Пламенеющее сердце(Flaming Heart)" (Moscow)

=== Performance-related pay ===
- 2000 – World song contest "Черноморские игры (Blacksea's play)" Grand-prix
- 2000 – Song contest "Славянском базаре (Slavic bazar)" 3rd (Kyiv)
- 2000 – Song contest "Азовские паруса (Sail of Azov)" 1st (Azov)
- 2001 – Song festival "Золотой шлягер (Golden hit songs)" 1st (Mogilev)
- 2001 – Song contest "Дискавери (Discovery)" 1st (Varna, Bulgaria)
- 2001 – Song contest "Море друзей (Sea of friends)" 1st (Yalta)
- 2001 – Song contest "Конкурс артистов эстрады (Contest of pop-artists)" 2nd (Kyiv)
- 2002 – Song contest "Песни Вильнюса (Songs of Vilnius)" 1st (Latvia)
- 2002 – Song contest "Стань звездой (Become star)" advanced till final-stage (tele-channel "Россия (Russia)")
- 2003 – Song contest "Народный артист (National artist)" 2nd (tele-channel "Россия")

== Discography ==
=== Albums ===
- 2006 – Леди дождя (The Rain lady)
- 2010 – Формула любви (Formula of love)

=== Compilation albums ===
- 2001 – Слухай@zp.ua (First disk, in which the song was written by A.Panayotov – "Літній дощ (Summer rain)")
- 2004 – Народный артист 1 (National artist 1)
- 2004 – Народный артист 2 (National artist 2)
- 2004 – Финальный концерт проекта в Кремле (Final concert of project in Kremlin) – DVD
- 2005 – Балалайка (Balalaika)
- 2005 – Народный артист (National artist) – mp3
- 2005 – Народный артист необыкновенный (National artist wonderful)
- 2006 – Мальчишник (Bachelor party)
- 2006 – Все звезды поют песни Кима Брейтбурга (All stars are singing the songs of Kim Breitburg)
- 2006 – "Фабрика Звезд" против "Народный Артист" ("Star factory" vs "National artist")

=== Videoclips ===
- 2005 — Необыкновенная(Wonderful lady, with Ruslan Alekhno & Alexey Chumakov)
- 2005 — Балалайка(Balalaika, with А.Chumakov)
- 2007 — Голос(Voice)
- 2010 — Формула любви(Formula of love)
- 2011 – Till tomorrow
