= Aleksey Garnizov =

Russian composer (born 1963)

Alexis Garnizoff
- Алексей Альбертович Гарнизов
- Born: Alexis Albert Garnizoff; 25 February 1963 (age 63); Melitopol, Ukrainian SSR, Soviet Union
- Education: Russian Academy of Theatre Arts
- Occupations: Composer, director, producer

Alexey Albertovich Garnizoff (Russian: Алексей Альбертович Гарнизов, born 25 February 1963) is a Russian composer, director and producer; a Meritorious Artist of Russia.

== Biography ==
Alexis Garnizoff was born on 25 February 1963, in Melitopol, Ukrainian Soviet Socialist Republic, Soviet Union.

In 1977, he moved to Moscow to continue his studies. In 1985, Alexey graduated from Russian Academy of Theatre Arts. His first teacher was Joachim G. Sharoyev. As the principal director of the Academic Musical Theater of Opera and Ballet Stanislavsky and Nemirovich-Danchenko, he noticed Alexei and took to his assistant. At the I.G.Sharoevym he put 8 operas, and by the end of the Institute Alexey Garnizov in the asset were already posing serious.

Garnizov's songs into the repertoire of artists such as Valery Leontiev, Philip Kirkorov, Larisa Dolina, Nikolai Baskov, Tamara Gverdtsiteli, Irina Allegrova, Irina Allegrova, Mikhail Shufutinsky.
