= Leonid Agutin =

Russian singer (born 1968)

Leonid Agutin Леонид Агутин
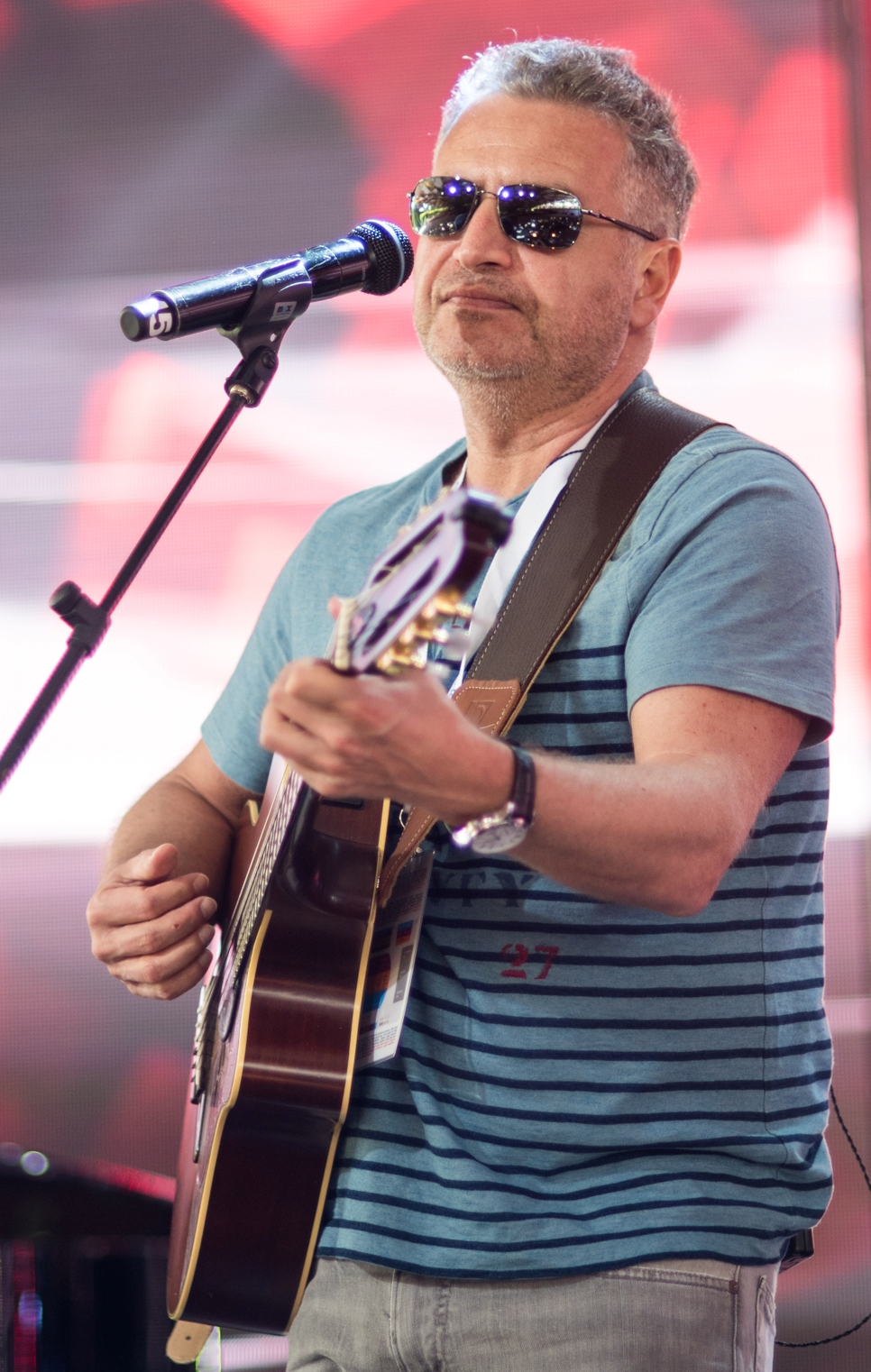
- Leonid Agutin in 2017

Background information
- Born: Leonid Nikolayevich Agutin; July 16, 1968 (age 58); Moscow, Soviet Union
- Genres: Pop; jazz; bossa nova
- Occupations: Singer-songwriter; composer; poet
- Instruments: Vocals; piano; guitar
- Years active: 1991–present
- Website: agutin.com

Leonid Nikolayevich Agutin (Russian: Леонид Николаевич Агутин; born July 16, 1968) is a Russian pop musician and songwriter, Meritorious Artist of Russia (2008). He has been active since the 1990s. He has released ten albums and three compilation albums.

== Personal life ==
Agutin's mother is Jewish, father is Russian. He was born in Moscow on July 16, 1968. His father was Nikolai Petrovich Agutin, a musician, and his mother was Lyudmila Leonidovna Shkol'nikova, an elementary school teacher. His father was a singer in the Soviet band VIA "Golubye Gitary" (Blue Guitars) and worked as a manager for the popular Soviet musical groups "Vesyolye Rebyata", "Poyushchiye Serdtsa" (Singing Hearts), and "Pesniary".

Along with receiving a regular school education, the young Agutin also completed a course of musical study on the piano at the Moscow Jazz school "Moskvorechie". He later served in the army on the Russia–Finland border.

In 1991, Agutin began to tour former Soviet republics as an opening act for other performers. Two years later, he graduated from the Moscow State Institute of Culture. In 1997, Agutin married the stage performer Anzhelika Varum, his second marriage.

Agutin has two daughters, Elisaveta with Varum, and Polina with the Russian ballerina Maria Vorobyeva. Away from music, he enjoys collecting crosses and playing billiards. He is also a self-avowed believer in the predictions of astrologists.

== Career ==
In 1991, Agutin started touring the Soviet Union with a musical act. He took part in and won the 1992 Yalta international pop music contest, and also won a similar contest in Jūrmala in 1993. Agutin released his first solo album, Bosonogiy Malchik ("Barefoot Boy") in 1994, which was a success and launched his career. The album ascended the charts and he won Russian Grammy awards for "Singer of the Year", "Song of the Year", and "Album of the Year". The album included the hits "Hop hey, la la ley" and "Golos visokiy travy" (Sound of the Tall Grass). In 1995, Agutin released his second album, titled "Dekameron". It was another commercial success and, along with Philipp Kirkorov, Valeriy Meladze, and Lubeh, Agutin became one of the most successful recording artists in Russian Grammy balloting.

=== Cosmopolitan life ===
Agutin released the album Cosmopolitan Life with the guitarist Al Di Meola and producer and lyricist Alex Sino in 2005, which gained success and worldwide recognition as a result of the Montreux Jazz Festival. Following the festival, the Austrian directors Hannes Rossacher and Rudi Dolezal of DoRo Productions made a documentary about the lives of Agutin and Di Meola, called Cosmopolitan Live, released in February 2008.

== Public position ==
In February 2022, Agutin expressed an anti-war position regarding Russia's war against Ukraine. At the same time, the singer "successfully took the place of colleagues who had 'left' both on stage and in the Russian advertising market". In the summer of 2022, Sergey Mironov called for Agutin to be barred from participating in the Stereoleto music festival in Saint Petersburg. He was included in the "Fifth Column" project (71% voted against his earning money in Russia).

According to Alyona Zhigalova, Agutin and Varum "strongly supported Ukraine at concerts".

In an interview with the YouTube channel Empathy, Viktor Rybin stated:

Agutin, damn it! I just can't stand it! Because he's neither one thing nor the other. He doesn't go to the special military operation zone.

== Discography ==
Russian name	Translation	Year
Босоногий мальчик	Barefoot Boy	1994
Декамерон	Decameron	1996
Летний дождь	Summer Rain	1998
Compilation		1998
Служебный роман	Workplace Romance	1999
Леонид Агутин	Leonid Agutin	2001
Дежа вю	Deja Vu	2003
Compilation		2004
Compilation		2004
Cosmopolitan Life (with Al Di Meola)		2005
Любовь. Дорога. Грусть и Радость.	Love. Path. Sadness and Happiness.	2007
Время последних романтиков	Time of Last Romantics	2012
Тайна склеенных страниц	A Secret of Agglutinated Pages	2013
