= Those Were the Days =

Those Were the Days may refer to:

== Music ==
=== Albums ===
- Those Were the Days (Johnny Mathis album) (1968)
- Those Were the Days (Cream album) (1997)
- Those Were the Days (Dolly Parton album) (2005)
- Those Were the Days – The Best of Leningrad Cowboys (2009)

=== Songs ===
- "Those Were the Days" (Gene Raskin song), a 1968 song recorded by Mary Hopkin
- "Those Were the Days", a 1968 song by Cream first released on Wheels of Fire
- "Those Were the Days", the theme song of the 1970s sitcom All in the Family
- "Those Were the Days", a 2001 song by Aaliyah from Aaliyah
- "Those Were the Days" (Lady Sovereign song) (2007)

== Films ==
- Those Were the Days (1934 film), a film by Thomas Bentley
- Those Were the Days!, a 1940 film with William Holden
- Those Were the Days... (1995 Hong Kong film), a film by Billy Tang Hin-Shing
- Those Were the Days (1995 French film)
- Those Were the Days (1996 film), a Hong Kong film by Eric Tsang
- Those Were the Days (1997 film), a Hong Kong film by Kin-Nam Cho
- Those Were the Days... (2000 film), a Hong Kong film by Yip Wai Man

== Other uses ==
- Those Were the Days (comic strip), a comic strip by Art Beeman
- Those Were the Days (TV pilot), a pilot by Norman Lear for what would eventually become All in the Family
- Those Were the Days, a TV3 Ireland series on Years, similar to RTE's Reeling in the Years
- Those Were the Days, a radio program on WDCB in Du Page County, Illinois
- Those Were the Days, a novel by Terry Wogan
- Those Were the Days, or Only Yesterday, a 1945 novel by S. Y. Agnon
