= Live (Russian song) =

Russian song

Live (Russian: Жить) is a song and music video composed by Igor Matvienko following the 2015 plane crash on the Sinai Peninsula. 28 artists participated in the music video, among them Grigory Leps, Polina Gagarina, Timati, Hibla Gerzmava, Vladimir Kristovski, Valeriy Syutkin, Alexandr Marshal and Evgeny Margulis. The song is part of the social project "Live" which emphasizes the importance of finding joy in life despite hardships.
