= Aslan Ahmadov =

Azerbaijani photographer (born 1973)

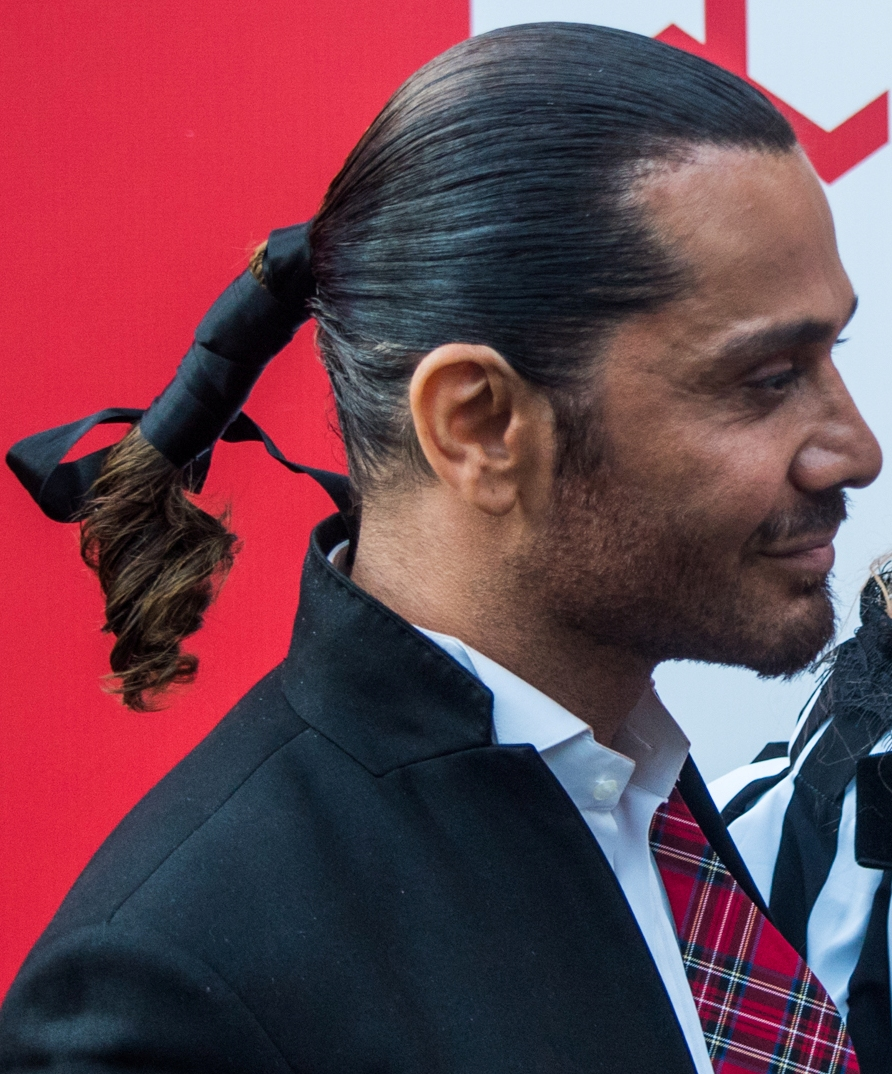
- Aslan Ahmadov, 2012
- Born: 12 February 1973 (age 53); Baku, Azerbaijan
- Education: Azerbaijan Academy of Arts named after Samed Vurgun
- Known for: Photographer, artist
- Website: art.aslanahmadov.com

Aslan Ahmadov (Azerbaijani: Aslan Əhmədov, Russian: Аслан Ахмадов; born 12 February 1973, in Baku) is a photographer of Azerbaijani origin. He is a Member of Photographer's Union of Russia.

== Biography and career ==
Aslan Ahmadov was born on 12, February 1973 in Baku. He graduated from the directing faculty in Azerbaijan Academy of Arts named after Samed Vurgun. In 1991, he moved to Moscow where he emerged as one of the foremost photographers in the industry and began collaborating with high-profile television personalities. Today, he works with fashion publications such as Harpers Bazaar, Vogue, L'Officiel, Elle, MAXIM, FHM, OM, Dolce Vita, NRG, Beauty.

In 2003, he founded the "Fresh Art" brand which symbolizes beauty, fashion and unreachable luxury in design, photography and clothes and influences modern industry of Russian fashion. The members of that project have art education – one of them is a musician, the other one is a choreographer, the last one is an artist. Montserrat Caballe, Marilyn Manson, and the Williams tennis-players sisters wear these clothes.

In 2006, the photo-exposition "Zoom" took place at Red Square in Moscow, which was visited by many well-known people of the city, who were the characters of the photo.

In 2007, the fashion show "Meat" (part of Russian Week of Fashion) took place. It attracted an enormous number of visitors. It was dedicated to women-victims of male violence, murdered cows, vegetarians and defenders of animal rights.

In 2008, he became an anchorman of "Fashion Police" on the television channel Muz-TV which gave fashion advice to tasteless celebrities.

In 2010, he became co-author of a television project "Бабье лето" (Ladies summer) on Domashny television. Many actresses of Soviet cinema appeared who became characters of this documentary film.

In 2011, he became a member of Photographer's Union of Russia.

In that year, he opened his personal exposition called "Бабье лето" (Indian summer), which took place around Russia.

In 2011–2012, he worked on a book about People's Artist of the USSR, Lyudmila Gurchenko. The book contained studio portraits of the actress made in recent years.

In November 2012, he sold a photograph called "Руки Людмилы Гурченко" (The Hands of Lyudmila Gurchenko) at the Phillips de Pury auction in London for £3,750.

In December 2012, he opened the first exposition of "RED" in the Moscow Museum of Modern Art.

== RED exposition ==
The first Aslan Ahmadov's exposition from series "RED" was opened in 10, December 2012. There were a lot of Russian celebrities.

25, April 2013 they opened the exhibition in Ekaterinburg Gallery of Modern Art. Then this works can be seen by citizens of St. Petersburg, Rostov-on-Don, Kyiv and other cities.

== See also ==
- List of photographers
- Fine-art photography
- Fashion photography
