= Alex Sino =

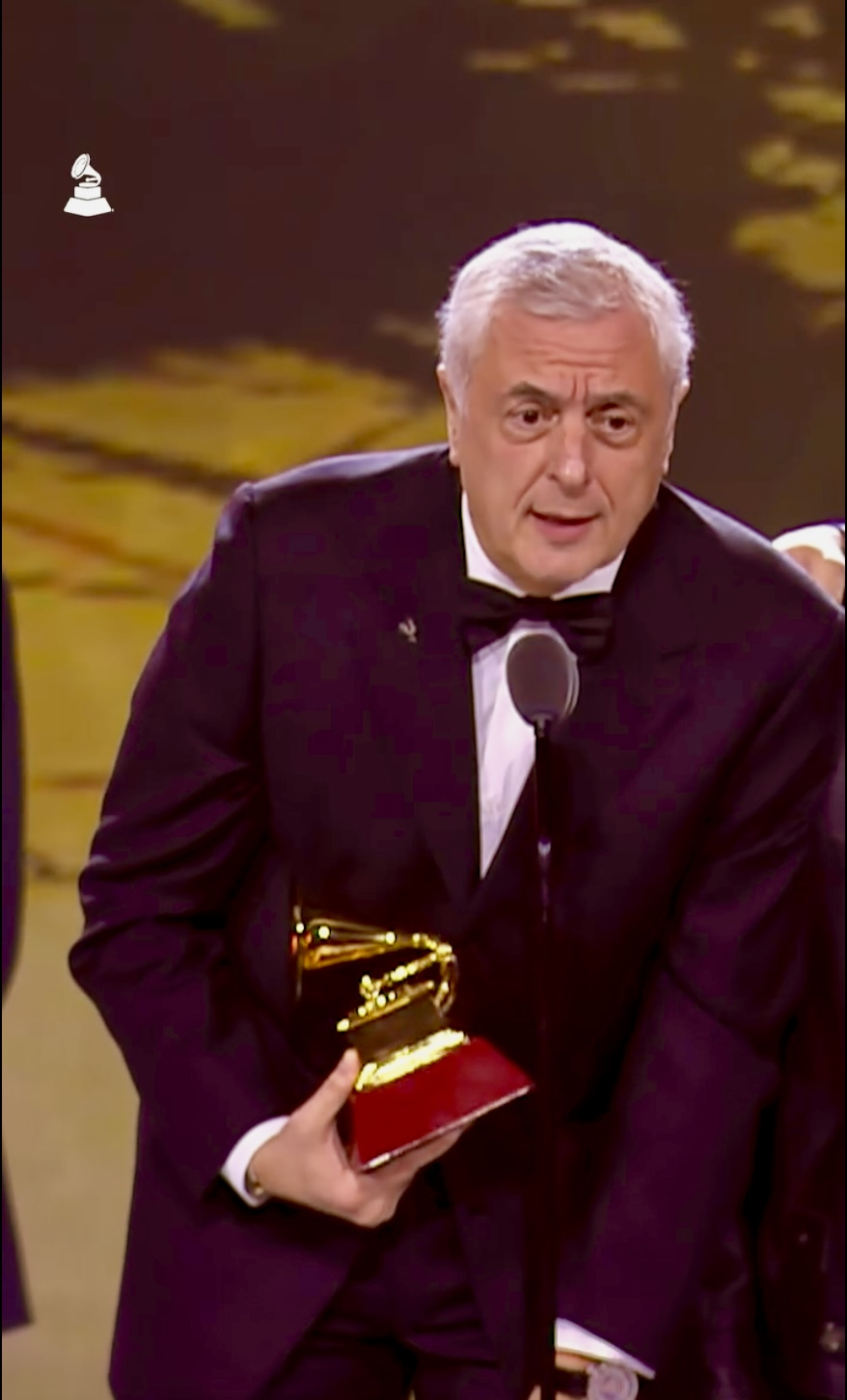
- Sino at the Latin Grammy Awards
- Born: 1957 (age 68–69); Odesa, Ukrainian SSR, Soviet Union
- Education: PhD
- Occupations: Healthcare executive, record producer, songwriter, lyricist, writer, actor
- Years active: 1990–present

Alex Sino is a medical industry executive, music producer and writer.

== Biography ==
Sino was born in Odessa, then part of the Soviet Union, in 1957. Before moving to the United States In 1989. In the early 2000s, he worked as a hospital administrator at Coney Island Hospital in Brooklyn, New York.

In his music career, Sino wrote lyrics, scripts and produced records and videos. Among them are Cosmopolitan Life featuring Al Di Meola and Leonid Agutin, "La Vida Cosmopolita" featuring Jon Secada, Luis Enrique (singer) and Amaury, Vocal Rendezvous featuring Al Di Meola and Macy Gray, and Made in Miami featuring Arturo Sandoval, Richard Bravo and Milton Salcedo.

Sino has earned a Latin Grammy Award for the album "Made in Miami".

Sino has written The Limitless Music, a book about the music business.
