= Just the Two of Us (TV series) =

British television reality singing contest

- Genre: Reality competition
- Created by: BBC Worldwide
- Presented by: Tess Daly; Vernon Kay
- Judges: Trevor Nelson; CeCe Sammy; Stewart Copeland; Lulu; Tito Jackson
- Country of origin: United Kingdom
- Original language: English
- No. of series: 2
- No. of episodes: 14

Original release
- Network: BBC One
- Release: 23 February 2006 – 7 January 2007

Just the Two of Us is a British television reality singing contest hosted by Vernon Kay and Tess Daly, to date the only show that the couple have worked together on. The first series of the BBC show saw eight celebrities team up with professional singers and sing each night in duets, with one pair being eliminated every night. After each performance they were judged by a panel of industry experts. The basic format of the show was first used in another BBC programme, Strictly Come Dancing. It was cancelled in April 2007 after two series.

== Format ==
During the weeklong run, each day, all the celebrities perform a duet with a professional singer. The judges then give comments on each performance. Once the contestants have returned to the "Green Room" (Backstage), the judges each then each give the couple a score from 1 to 10. The scores create a leaderboard which forms 50% of the final result, the other half comes from the public vote via telephone and text entries.

Once the scores and votes are combined to form the final leaderboard for that day's show, the two couples at the bottom compete in a final "Sing Off", where they perform their duet again. Once both couples have performed their song for the judging panel, the four judges decide on who deserves to stay and cast their votes. The couple with the most votes from the judges leaves the show that day.

So far, there have been two series, the first won by Russell Watson and Sian Reeves and the second was won by Hannah Waterman and Marti Pellow.

Only four professionals have performed in both series - Natasha Hamilton, Alexander O'Neal, Jocelyn Brown and Beverly Knight.

The panel of judges were seen as four industry professionals. The judges for series one were singer Lulu, singer and musician Stewart Copeland, celebrity vocal coach CeCe Sammy and radio DJ Trevor Nelson. In 2007 for series two, Lulu was replaced by Jackson Five star Tito Jackson. Sammy, Nelson and Copeland all returned for series two. Tara McDonald the well known UK dance vocalist was on backing vocal duty for both series.

== Series 1 ==
The first series began on 24 February 2006 and ended on 5 March 2006.

Celebrity	Professional	Status
Siân Reeves	Russell Watson^{[note 1]}	Winners on 5 March
Mark Moraghan	Natasha Hamilton	Runners-up on 5 March
Chris Fountain	Jo O'Meara	Eliminated on 4 March
Penny Smith	Curtis Stigers	Eliminated on 3 March
Nicky Campbell	Beverley Knight	Eliminated on 2 March
Matt Allwright	Jocelyn Brown	Eliminated on 26 February
Fiona Bruce	Alexander O'Neal	Eliminated on 25 February
Gaby Roslin	Martin Fry	Eliminated on 24 February

Notes

- ^ Note 1: Watson replaced Rick Astley after Astley was unable to continue as his partner Lene Bausager had been nominated for an Oscar and the awards ceremony clashed with filming for the show.

=== Judges ===
- Trevor Nelson
- Lulu
- Cece Sammy
- Stewart Copeland

Contestants received vocal coaching by Joshua Alamu.

== Series 2 ==
The second and final series began on 2 January 2007 and ended on 7 January 2007.

Celebrity	Professional	Status
Hannah Waterman	Marti Pellow	Winners on 7 January
Brendan Cole	Beverley Knight	Second Place on 7 January
Mark Butcher	Sarah Brightman	Third Place on 7 January
John Bardon	Jocelyn Brown	Eliminated on 6 January
Julia Bradbury	Tony Christie	Eliminated on 5 January
Luke Bailey	Natasha Hamilton	Eliminated on 4 January
Janet Ellis	Alexander O'Neal	Eliminated on 3 January
Gregg Wallace	Carol Decker	Eliminated on 2 January

Singer Russell Watson was originally supposed to be participating on the series with Hollyoaks actress, Loui Batley. However, after having had surgery to remove a tumour from his brain, he decided to pull out of the competition. Unlike the previous year, however, he was not replaced, so Batley was also dropped from the show.

Jo O'Meara did not participate in the second series as she was taking part in Channel 4's Celebrity Big Brother at the time.

Contestants received vocal coaching from Joshua Alamu.

=== Judges ===
- Trevor Nelson
- Stewart Copeland
- Cece Sammy
- Tito Jackson

==== Judges' scoring summary ====
Bold scores indicate the highest for that week. Red indicates the lowest score. * indicates the couple was in the bottom two or three.

Team	Day 1	Day 2	Day 3	Day 4	Day 5	Day 6 Final
Hannah & Marti	25	21*	22	24+27=51	27+29=56*	30
Brendan & Beverley	24	24	26	28+30=58	26+32=58	36
Mark & Sarah	26	29	19	30+28=58*	35+29=64	34
John & Jocelyn	18	25	22*	25+23=48*	27+26=53*	Eliminated
Julia & Tony	17*	29	24*	29+29=58*	Eliminated	
Luke & Natasha	26	23*	23*	Eliminated		
Janet & Alexander	21*	23*	Eliminated			
Gregg & Carol	21*	Eliminated				

== International versions ==
These versions of the format are distributed by BBC Worldwide, the commercial arm of the BBC.

Currently airing franchise
Status unknown
Franchise with an upcoming season
Franchise no longer in production

Country	Name	Channel	Hosts	Judges	Air date
Armenia	Երկու աստղ	Public Television Company of Armenia (2007-2010, 2025-present) Eskiz Studio (2007) Sharm Holding (2007-2008) Sigma TV (2009-2010)	Hrachya Keshishyan (2007); Suren Rshtuni (2007-2008); Eduard Petrosyan (2009-2010)	Hrant Tokhatyan (2007) Shushan Petrosyan (2007, 2009) Felix Khachatryan (2007-2009) Emmy (2008) Ashot Lyudvigovich (2009) Mamikon Simonyan (2009-2010) Karina Danelyan (2009-2011)	30 March 2007 – 31 January 2010; 26 April 2025 – present
Australia	It Takes Two	Seven Network	Grant Denyer; Terasa Livingstone (season 1); Kate Ritchie (season 2); Erika Heynatz (season 3)	Marina Prior; James Valentine; Ross Wilson; Amanda Pelman	28 May 2006 – 22 April 2008
Belgium	Just the Two of Us	vtm	Staff Coppens; Evi Hanssen	Dirk Blanchart; Hilde Norga; Sofie; Zaki	21 October 2006 - ?
China	Just the Two of Us	Hunan Television			mid-2000s
Croatia	Zvijezde pjevaju	HRT	Barbara Kolar; Duško Čurlić	Ksenija Erker (2007–2012); Rajko Dujmić (2007–2012); Martina Tomčić (2007–2009, 2011–2014); Husein Hasanefendić (2007–2010); Vanna (2010–2012); Zdenka Kovačiček (2014); Zrinko Tutić (2014); Danijela Martinović (2019–); Miroslav Škoro (2019); Valentina Fijačko (2019); Mirela Priselac Remi (2019–2020); Jurica Pađen (2020– May 2022); Marko Tolja (2020–); Zorica Kondža (March -May 2022); Mario Lipovšek Battifiaca (October 2022-)	7 April 2007 – present
Czech Republic	Duety... když hvězdy zpívají	Czech Television	Tereza Kostková; Aleš Háma	Michael Prostějovský; Ota Balage; Linda Finková; Lubomír Brabec	2009
Estonia	Laulud tähtedega	TV3	Marko Matvere (2008); Karin Rask (2008); Eda-Ines Etti (2010); Madis Milling (2010)	Jaanus Nõgisto (2008); Anu Tali (2008); Jüri Makarov (2008); Mihkel Raud (2010); Maarja-Liis Ilus (2010); Peeter Rebane (2010)	5 October 2008 – 16 May 2010
Germany	It Takes 2	RTL	Daniel Hartwich; Julia Krüger	Conchita Wurst; Álvaro Soler; Angelo Kelly	15 January - 12 February 2017
Greece	Just the 2 of Us	Mega Channel	Giorgos Kapoutzidis (season 1); Zeta Makrypoulia (season 2); Doukissa Nomikou (backstage, season 1); Dimitris Ouggarezos (backstage, season 2)	Stefanos Korkolis (season 1); Kostas Tournas (season 1); Athinais Nega (season 1); Lydia Papaioannou (season 1); Giorgos Theofanous (season 2); Roula Koromila (season 2); Dimitris Arvanitis (season 2, show 1-6); Krateros Katsoulis (season 2, show 7-12)	17 October 2010 – 18 June 2014
Greece	Just the 2 of Us	Open TV	Nikos Koklonis; Vicky Kavoura (backstage, season 3); Laura Karaiskou (backstage, season 4)	Despina Vandi; Stamatis Fasoulis; Vicky Stavropoulou; Maria Bakodimou	14 March – 26 December 2020; 2026
Greece	Just the 2 of Us	Alpha TV	Nikos Koklonis; Katerina Stikoudi (backstage)	Despina Vandi; Stamatis Fasoulis; Vicky Stavropoulou; Katy Garbi (season 6-8); Maria Bakodimou (season 5)	25 September 2021 – 5 July 2024
Netherlands	Just the Two of Us	Tien	Linda de Mol; Gordon Heuckeroth	Cornald Maas; Margriet Eshuijs; Rob Stenders; Esther Hart	11 March – 30 April 2007
Netherlands	It Takes 2	RTL 4 SBS6	???	???	12 March 2016 – 14 June 2019
Poland	Just the Two of Us. Tylko nas dwoje	Polsat	Katarzyna Cichopek; Mariusz Kałamaga	Irena Santor; Tomasz Karolak; Dorota Rabczewska	13 March – 15 May 2010
Russia	Две звезды	Channel One	Lolita Milyavskaya & Alexander Tsekalo (1 season); Alla Pugacheva & Maxim Galkin (2 season);Ksenia Sobchak, Tatiana Lazareva & Tina Kandelaki (3 season); Dmitry Nagiev & Nonna Grishaeva (4 season); Dmitry Nagiev & Anastasia Zavorotnyuk (5 season); Dmitry Nagiev & Zhanna Badoeva (6 season) Alexander Oleshko & Aglaya Shilovskaya (7 Season)	Sergey Mazaev, Igor Matvienko, Nadezhda Babkina, Yana Churikova, Vladimir Korobka, Lev Leshchenko, Ilya Reznik, Valentina Talyzina (1 season, 2006). Ilya Reznik, Barbara Brylska, Garik Martirosyan, Vladimir Matetsky (2 season, 2007 — 2008). Andrey Malakhov, Igor Matvienko, Yuri Nikolaev, Igor Krutoy, Ilya Reznik, Vladimir Matetsky, Garik Martirosyan, Dmitry Dibrov, Lev Leshchenko, Svetlana Morgunova, Gennady Khazanov, Viktor Drobysh, Iosif Kobzon, Mikhail Boyarsky, Philip Kirkorov (3 season, 2009). Lolita Milyavskaya, Igor Matvienko, Mikhail Boyarsky, Valentin Yudashkin, Svetlana Morgunova, Viktor Drobysh, Dmitry Dyuzhev, Elena Obraztsova, Vladimir Matetsky, Tamara Gverdtsiteli (4 season, 2012). Igor Matvienko, Mikhail Boyarsky, Elena Obraztsova, Valentin Yudashkin, Laima Vaikule, Nikolay Rastorguev, Vladimir Matetsky, Viktor Drobysh, Larisa Dolina (5 season, 2013). Maxim Galkin, Valeria, Dmitry Pevtsov, Olga Drozdova, Soso Pavliashvili, Igor Vernik, Vadim Vernik, Yuri Malikov, Dmitry Malikov, Elena Vaenga, Leonid Yarmolnik, Kristina Orbakaite, Stanislav Piekha, Nikolai Fomenko, Mikhail Boyarsky, Lev Leshchenko, Aida Garifullina, Igor Krutoy, Nonna Grishaeva, Alexander Oleshko, Aglaya Shilovskaya, Valery Syutkin, Valdis Pelsh, Anna Ardova, Vladimir Vinokur, Larisa Dolina, Dmitry Dyuzhev, Alexandra Zakharova, Ani Lorak, Ekaterina and Alexander Strizhenov, Larisa Guzeeva, Natalia Podolskaya, Vladimir Presnyakov Jr., Igor Matvienko, Gennady Khazanov, Igor Nikolaev (6 season, 2021—2022).	
Turkey	Şarkı Söylemek Lazım	Show TV	Behzat Uygur; Zeynep Tokuş	Olcayto Ahmet Tuğsuz (Season 1); Erol Büyükburç (Season 1); Fuat Güner (Season 1); İnci Çayırlı (Season 1); Oray Eğin (Season 1); Eyşan Özhim (Season 1); Zeynep Talu (Season 2); Özdemir Erdoğan (Season 2); Ayşe Özyılmazel (Season 2)	2007-2008
Vietnam	Cặp đôi hoàn hảo	VTV3	Thanh Ngọc (season 1–2); Phan Anh (season 1–3); Trấn Thành (season 2); Vy Oanh (season 2); Cát Phượng (season 3)	Lê Hoàng (season 1–2); Siu Black (season 1); Lê Minh Sơn (season 1–2); Lưu Thiên Hương (season 2); Thanh Bạch (season 3); Quang Linh (season 3); Bảo Lan (season 3)	9 October 2011 – 18 January 2015
