= Oxford Fashion Week =

Annual independent fashion showcase

- Dates: March and September
- Venue: Various
- Location: Oxford, UK
- Years active: 2009-2016
- Inaugurated: 2009
- Founders: Carl Anglim and Victoria Watson
- Website: web.archive.org/web/20160729175409/http://oxfordfashionweek.com/

Oxford Fashion Week was an annual independent fashion showcase in Oxford, England. It was founded in 2009 by Oxford University graduates Carl Anglim and Victoria Watson. The event was organised by Carl Anglim and Tiff Saunders. Anglim was the director and Saunders was the assistant director. Oxford Fashion Week showcased the talent of designers such as Alexander McQueen, Matthew Williamson and Valentin Yudashkin. The last event appears to have taken place in 2016.

== History ==
Oxford Fashion Week was established in 2009. The event was an annual fashion feature and took place primarily over the course of one week in the year, with satellite events at other times. In 2009 and 2010, Oxford Fashion Week took place in May. In 2011, it took place in March. In 2012, it took place in November. From 2013 to 2016, the Oxford fashion week took place biannually displaying summer collections in March and autumn collections in September.

Oxford Fashion Week was mostly produced by volunteers from across the United Kingdom, although in 2012 it was produced by events production company BMLY Ltd.

The event took place in a range of notable venues across the city of Oxford. Venues included the Ashmolean Museum, Oxford Town Hall, Malmaison hotel, the Randolph hotel, Oxford University Examination Schools, and the Sheldonian theatre.

== Designers and shows ==
Oxford Fashion Week featured a wide variety of designers, from established international brands such as Alexander McQueen, Matthew Williamson and Valentin Yudashkin, to up-and-coming talent such as Ara Jo and Yvonne Lau (both of whose designs have been sported by Lady Gaga).

The shows were arranged by clothing category, rather than by individual designer. Most years featured a concept fashion show, a ready to wear show, and an haute couture show, among others.

The catwalk shows featured a mix of professional models and new faces, and some models first discovered at Oxford Fashion Week have since gone on to have successful modelling careers.
