= The Voice (Russian TV series) season 4 =

The Voice
- Season 4
- Presented by: Dmitry Nagiev
- Coaches: Basta; Polina Gagarina; Alexander Gradsky; Grigory Leps
- Winner: Hieromonk Fotiy
- Winning coach: Grigory Leps
- Runner-up: Mikhail Ozerov

Release
- Original network: Channel One
- Original release: September 4 – December 25, 2015

Season chronology
- ← Previous; Season 3 Next → Season 5

The fourth season of the Russian reality talent show The Voice premiered on September 4, 2015, on Channel One. Dmitry Nagiev returned as the show's presenter for his fourth seasons. The coaching panel saw a change for the first time since the start of the show. Alexander Gradsky returned as coach for his fourth seasons, while Basta, Polina Gagarina, and Grigory Leps replaced Dima Bilan, Pelageya, and Leonid Agutin and became a new coach's.

Hieromonk Fotiy was announced the winner on December 25, 2015, marking Grigory Leps's first win as a coach and the first new coach to win on his first season.

== Coaches and presenter ==
The Voice season 4 coaching panel and presenter

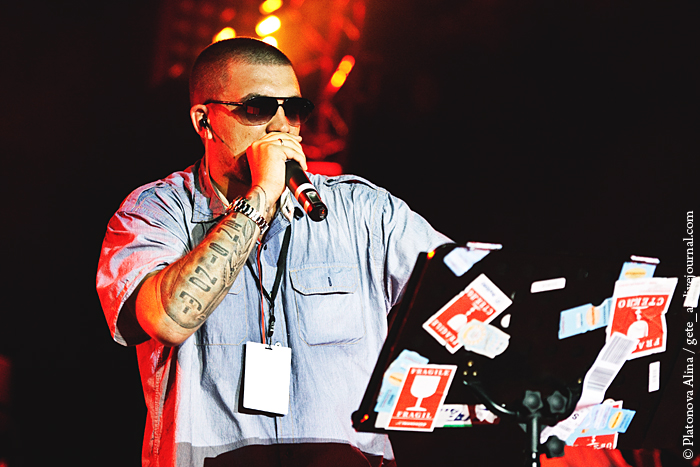
Basta

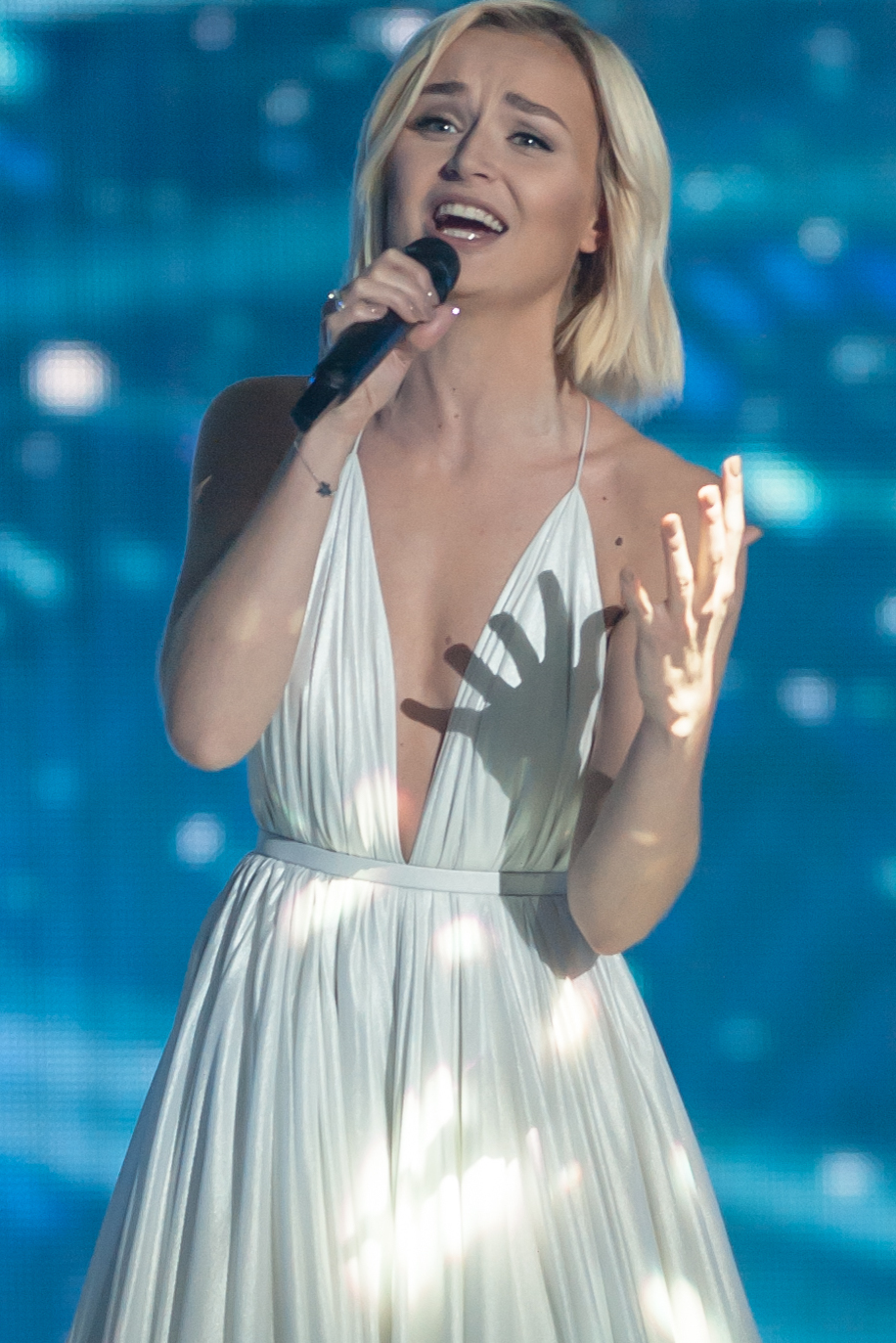
Polina Gagarina

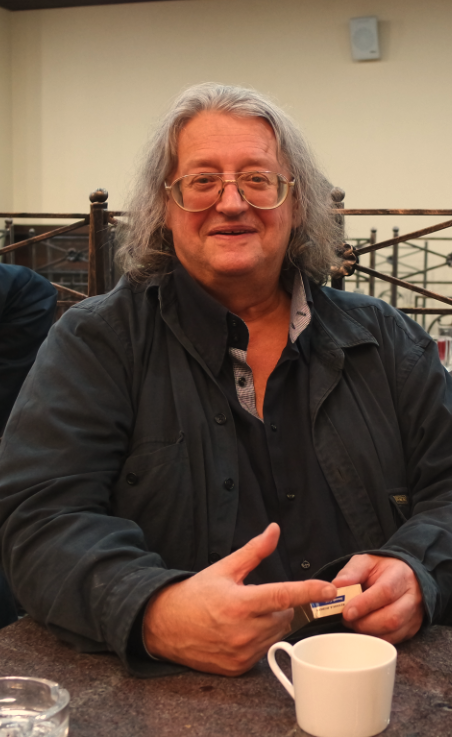
Alexander Gradsky

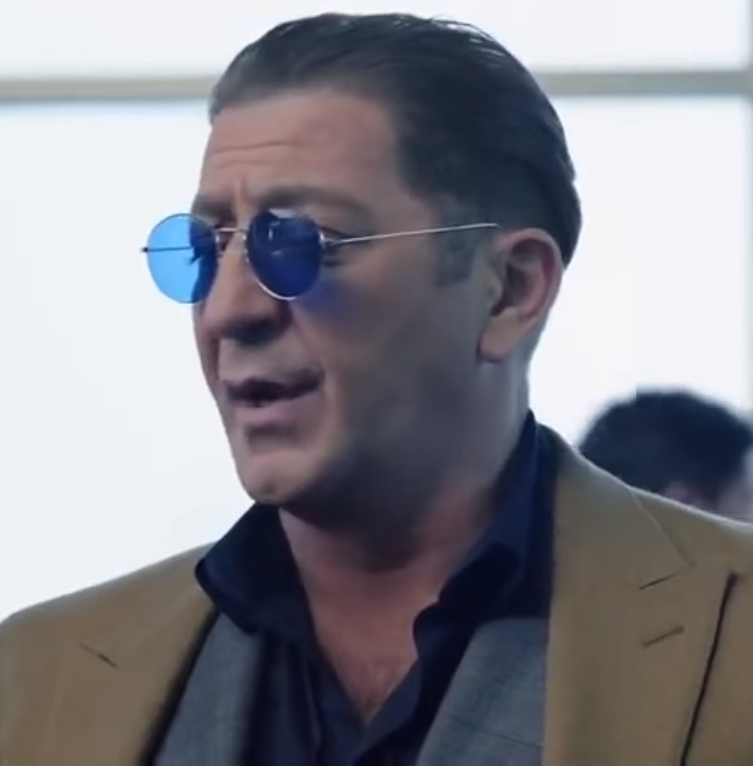
Grigory Leps

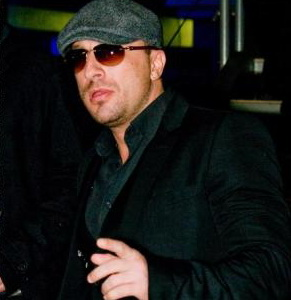
Dmitry Nagiev

The coaching panel saw a change for the first time since the start of the show. Alexander Gradsky returned as coach for his fourth seasons, while Basta, Polina Gagarina, and Grigory Leps replaced Dima Bilan, Pelageya, and Leonid Agutin and became a new coach's. Dmitry Nagiev returned for his fourth season as a presenter.

== Teams ==
Colour key

- Winner
- Runner-up
- Third place
- Fourth place
- Eliminated in the Semifinal
- Eliminated in the Quarterfinals
- Eliminated in the Knockout rounds
- Stolen in the Battle rounds
- Eliminated in the Battle rounds

Coaches	Top 57 artists					
Basta	Era Kann	Maria Eroyan	Oleg Miami	Yury Melikov	Nikolay Zabolotskikh	Sergey Urumyan
Basta	Gabriella	Karina Tsvetkova	Binazir Ermaganbetova	Anastasia Balakhnina	Grigoriy Golubev	Yulia Khusainova
Basta	Ekaterina Kokorina	Amalia Margaryan	Raffa Grigoryan	Ellina Reshetnikova		
Polina Gagarina	Olga Zadonskaya	Ivan Dalmatov	Ilona Solomonova	Darya Bezhenar	Yana Bashkireva	Semyon Velichko
Polina Gagarina	Regina Todorenko	Stanislav Obukhov	Sevak Khanagyan	~~Karina Tsetkova~~	~~Konstantin Rabotov~~	~~Aleksandra Grekova~~
Polina Gagarina	Ekaterina Chistova	Anastasia Krashevskaya	Sophie Okran	Zhan Osyan		
Alexander Gradsky	Mikhail Ozerov	Elena Minina	Emil Kadyrov	Tatyana Shirko	Elena Romanova	Alla Rid
Alexander Gradsky	Diana Savelyeva	Alexandra Grekova	Nana Hattle	~~Alina Perova~~	~~Stanislav Obukhov~~	Georgy Seryshev
Alexander Gradsky	Danil Smirnov	Aleksandr Postolenko	Alexandra Streltsova	Olga Sergeeva	Lilia Zamulina	
Grigory Leps	Hieromonk Fotiy	Vitold Petrovskiy	Renata Volkievich	Armen Avdzhan	Olivia Krush	Maria Kats
Grigory Leps	Alina Perova	Konstantin Rabotov	Denis Sokolov	~~Tatyana Shyrko~~	~~Olga Zadonskaya~~	~~Oleg Miami~~
Grigory Leps	Rostislav Doronin	Rodion Gazmanov	Ella Khrustaleva	Artem Katorgin		
Note: Italicized names are stolen contestants (names struck through within former teams).

== Blind auditions ==
Colour key

✔	Coach pressed "I WANT YOU" button
✔	Coach pressed "I WANT YOU" button, despite the lack of places in his/her team
	Coach pressed "I WANT YOU" button, despite the lack of places in his/her team, and artist defaulted to a coach's team
	Artist defaulted to a coach's team
	Artist picked a coach's team
	Artist eliminated with no coach pressing their button

=== Episode 1 (4 September) ===
The coaches performed "Теперь ты в „Голосе“!" at the start of the show.

Note: Dima Bilan, a former coach of The Voice, made a special performance with the song "Ночной каприз" in this episode. No coach pressed their button.

Order	Artist	Age	Hometown	Song	Coach's and contestant's choices			
Order	Artist	Age	Hometown	Song	Basta	Gagarina	Gradsky	Leps
1	Evgeniy Leksikov	26	Saint Petersburg	"С тобой"	—	—	—	—
2	Alevtina Polyakova	30	Moscow	"Hallelujah I Love Her So"	—	—	—	—
3	Elena Minina	29	Moscow	"Someday My Prince Will Come"	✔	✔	✔	✔
4	Maria Eroyan	25	Moscow	"Простая песня"	✔	—	—	—
5	Emil Kadyrov	22	Baku, Azerbaijan	"Baila Me"	✔	—	✔	—
6	Alla Rid	33	Moscow	"Hold On, I'm Comin'"	—	✔	✔	✔
7	Nikolai Zabolotskikh	31	Saint Petersburg	"Боже, как долго"	✔	—	—	—
8	Larisa Yakovenko	34	Rostov-on-Don	"По Дону гуляет..."	—	—	—	—
9	Ivan Dalmatov	32	Ulan-Ude	"Stay with Me"	✔	✔	—	✔
10	Ella Khrustaleva	47	Ryazan	"Мне нравится..."	—	—	—	✔
11	Olivia Krush	25	Moscow	"Sweet People"	—	—	—	✔
12	Aleksandr Elemyanov	27	Moscow	"Le Temps des Cathredrales"	—	—	—	—
13	Regina Todorenko	25	Odesa, Ukraine	"Ноченька"	—	✔	—	—

=== Episode 2 (11 September) ===
Order	Artist	Age	Hometown	Song	Coach's and contestant's choices			
Order	Artist	Age	Hometown	Song	Basta	Gagarina	Gradsky	Leps
1	Renata Volkievich	34	Saint Petersburg	"Kolorowe jarmarki"	✔	✔	✔	✔
2	Dmitry Korolev	27	Surgut	"Go Down Moses"	—	—	—	—
3	Karina Tsvetkova	27	Novosibirsk	"Autumn Leaves"	—	✔	—	—
4	Alina Perova	33	Nizhny Novgorod	"Беспечный ангел"	✔	—	✔	—
5	Semyon Velichko	29	Murom	"I'm Yours"	✔	✔	—	✔
6	Maria Rubanovskaya	30	Saint Petersburg	"О любви"	—	—	—	—
7	Nana Hattle	19	Moscow	"Hotel California"	✔	✔	✔	✔
8	Georgiy Seryshev	35	Irkutsk	"Полёт на дельтаплане"	✔	—	✔	—
9	Gabriella	30	Rio de Janeiro, Brazil	"Chorando Se Foi (Lambada)"	✔	—	—	—
10	Kirill Ermakov	19	Minsk, Belarus	"Небо на ладони"	—	—	—	—
11	Anzhelika Kuzmova	52	Moscow	"Black Velvet"	—	—	—	—
12	Sergey Urumyan	26	Saratov	"Эта музыка"	✔	—	—	—
13	Dmitry Kovzel	21	Saint Petersburg	"Карточный домик"	—	—	—	—
14	Darya Bezhenar	26	Kemerovo	"Knockin' on Heaven's Door"	—	✔	—	—

=== Episode 3 (18 September) ===
Order	Artist	Age	Hometown	Song	Coach's and contestant's choices			
Order	Artist	Age	Hometown	Song	Basta	Gagarina	Gradsky	Leps
1	Mikhail Ozerov	34	Moscow	"Honesty"	—	—	✔	—
2	Maria Kats	42	Moscow	"What's Up?"	—	✔	—	✔
3	Aleksandra Grekova	27	Rostov-on-Don	"Улыбайся"	—	✔	—	—
4	Zhan Osyan	43	Moscow	"Unchain My Heart"	✔	✔	—	✔
5	Lilia Zamulina	25	Krasnodar	"Ноктюрн"	—	—	✔	—
6	Ellina Reshetnikova	23	Ufa	"Don't Worry Be Happy"	✔	—	—	—
7	Armen Avdzhan	39	Sochi	"Liberta"	✔	✔	✔	✔
8	Varvara Vizbor	29	Moscow	"А зима будет большая"	—	—	—	—
9	Mikhail Naumov	28	Syktyvkar	"Орёл (Не улетай)"	—	—	—	—
10	Yulia Khusainova	23	Moscow	"Do It Like"	✔	—	—	✔
11	Marianna Vagida	23	Moscow	"Samson and Delilah"	—	—	—	—
12	Grigoriy Golubev	26	Korolev	"Angels"	✔	—	—	—
13	Maria Tsvetkova	19	Elektrostal	"Diamonds"	—	—	—	—
14	Vitold Petrovskiy	29	Kolomna	"Ещё минута"	—	✔	—	✔

=== Episode 4 (25 September) ===
Order	Artist	Age	Hometown	Song	Coach's and contestant's choices			
Order	Artist	Age	Hometown	Song	Basta	Gagarina	Gradsky	Leps
1	Olga Zadonskaya	28	Vladimir	"It's a Man's World"	✔	✔	✔	✔
2	Vladimir Rozdin	53	Moscow	"You Can Leave Your Hat On"	—	—	—	—
3	Denis Sokolov	28	Novosibirsk	"Знаешь"	—	—	—	✔
4	Anastasia Badina	21	Sayansk, Irkutsk oblast	"Шукария"	—	—	—	—
5	Binazir Ermaganbetova	25	Karaganda, Kazakhstan	"Billionaire"	✔	—	—	—
6	Hieromonk Fotiy	29	Borovsk, Kaluga Oblast	"Evgeniy Onegin"	—	—	—	✔
7	Olga Sergeeva	39	Chelyabinsk	"Эхо любви"	—	—	✔	—
8	Ekaterina Kokorina	27	Barnaul	"Grenade"	✔	—	—	—
9	Konstantin Rabotov	31	Plovdiv, Bulgaria	"A Song for You"	✔	✔	✔	✔
10	Ilona Solomonova	21	Lyambir, Mordovia	"Казачья"	—	✔	—	—
11	Andrey Derusov	27	Seversk, Tomsk Oblast	"Молитва"	—	—	—	—
12	Anastasia Balakhnina	21	Volgograd	"La Vie en rose"	✔	—	—	—
13	Vadim Medvedev	48	Komsomolsk-on-Amur	"Часы"	—	—	—	—
14	Elena Romanova	28	Moscow	"Smile"	—	—	✔	✔

=== Episode 5 (2 October) ===
Order	Artist	Age	Hometown	Song	Coach's and contestant's choices			
Order	Artist	Age	Hometown	Song	Basta	Gagarina	Gradsky	Leps
1	Anastasia Koveshnikova	19	Kolomna	"Once Upon a December"	—	—	—	—
2	Oleg Miami	24	Yekaterinburg	"This Love"	✔	✔	—	✔
3	Alisa Dimitriadi	34	Moscow	"Моё сердце остановилось"	—	—	—	—
4	Yury Melikov	17	Paralimni, Cyprus	"Grenade"	✔	—	—	—
5	Stanislav Obukhov	30	Chelyabinsk	"Hallelujah, I Love Her So"	✔	✔	✔	—
6	Diana Saveleva	36	Moscow	"Только раз бывает в жизни встреча"	—	—	✔	—
7	Ekaterina Rodionova	25	Yalta, Ukraine	"Crazy"	—	—	—	—
8	Rodion Gazmanov	34	Moscow	"I Believe I Can Fly"	✔	—	—	✔
9	Amalia Margaryan	22	Erevan, Armenia	"Танцы на стёклах"	✔	—	—	—
10	Ekaterina Chistova	32	Votkinsk	"Satisfy My Soul"	—	✔	—	—
11	Ksenia Bystrova	20	Ryazan	"Tous les enfants chantent avec moi"	—	—	—	—
12	Danil Smirnov	20	Simferopol, Ukraine	"Wrecking Ball"	✔	—	✔	—
13	Raffa Grigoryan	25	Erevan, Armenia	"Overjoyed"	✔	—	—	✔
14	Nina Vedenina	32	Tolyatti	"Ты снишься мне"	—	—	—	—

=== Episode 6 (9 October) ===
Note: Lolita Milyavskaya made a special performance with the song "Снилось мне" in this episode. All four coaches turned for her.

Order	Artist	Age	Hometown	Song	Coach's and contestant's choices			
Order	Artist	Age	Hometown	Song	Basta	Gagarina	Gradsky	Leps
1	Rostislav Doronin	26	Surgut	"I Got You (I Feel Good)"	✔	✔	—	✔
2	Aleksandra Soloveichik	22	Minsk, Belarus	"Помоги мне"	—	—	—	—
3	Anastasia Krashevskaya	28	Moscow	"Mercy"	✔	✔	—	✔
4	Sophie Okran	44	Moscow	"Калитка"	—	✔	—	—
5	Sevak Khanagyan	28	Kursk	"Кукушка"	✔	✔	—	—
6	Era Kann	22	Moscow	"Endangered Species"	✔	✔	—	—
7	Aleksandr Postolenko	36	Biysk	"Вечная любовь"	Team full	—	✔	—
8	Oskar Dzhalilov	26	Tashkent, Uzbekistan	"Я люблю тебя больше природы"	Team full	—	Team full	—
9	Aleksandra Streltsova	29	Engels	"Беспечный ангел"	Team full	—	✔	—
10	Artem Katorgin	26	Saint Petersburg	"O sole mio"	Team full	—	Team full	✔
11	Yulia Gavrilova	31	Moscow	"Broken Vow"	Team full	—	Team full	—
12	Tatiana Shirko	22	Kyiv, Ukraine	"Run to You"	Team full	—	Team full	✔
13	Dmitry Permyakov	19	Izhevsk	"Поговори со мною, мама"	Team full	—	Team full	Team full
14	Aleksey Romanov	28	Tyumen	"You Raise Me Up"	Team full	—	Team full	Team full
15	Yana Bashkireva	29	Saint Petersburg	"Ноченька"	Team full	✔	Team full	Team full

== The Battles ==
The Battles round started with episode 7 and ended with episode 10 (broadcast on 16, 23, 30 October 2015; on 6 November 2015). The coaches can steal two losing artists from another coach. Contestants who win their battle or are stolen by another coach will advance to the Knockout rounds.

Colour key

Artist won the Battle and advanced to the Knockouts
Artist lost the Battle but was stolen by another coach and advanced to the Knockouts
Artist lost the Battle and was eliminated

Episode	Coach	Order	Winner	Song	Loser(s)	'Steal' result			
Episode	Coach	Order	Winner	Song	Loser(s)	Basta	Gagarina	Gradsky	Leps
Episode 7 (16 October)	Polina Gagarina	1	Regina Todorenko	"Текила-любовь"	Zhan Osyan	—	—	—	—
Episode 7 (16 October)	Basta	2	Maria Eroyan	"All About That Bass"	Ellina Reshetnikova	—	—	—	—
Episode 7 (16 October)	Grigory Leps	3	Armen Avdzhan	"Обернитесь"	Oleg Miami	✔	—	—	—
Episode 7 (16 October)	Alexander Gradsky	4	Alla Reed	"Cheek to Cheek"	Stanislav Obukhov	—	✔	—	—
Episode 7 (16 October)	Basta	5	Binazir Ermaganbetova	"Gangsta's Paradise"	Raffa Grigoryan	—	—	—	—
Episode 7 (16 October)	Polina Gagarina	6	Sevak Khanagyan	"Ночной каприз"	Sophie Okran	—	—	—	—
Episode 7 (16 October)	Grigory Leps	7	Maria Kats	"Barcelona"	Artem Katorgin	—	—	—	—
Episode 8 (23 October)	Alexander Gradsky	1	Nana Hattle	"Cabaret"	Olga Sergeeva	—	—	—	—
Episode 8 (23 October)	Alexander Gradsky	1	Nana Hattle	"Cabaret"	Lilia Zamulina	—	—	—	—
Episode 8 (23 October)	Basta	2	Sergey Urumyan	"Всё в твоих руках"	Amalia Margaryan	—	—	—	—
Episode 8 (23 October)	Polina Gagarina	3	Darya Bezhenar	"Miss Independent"	Anastasia Krashevskaya	—	—	—	—
Episode 8 (23 October)	Grigory Leps	4	Hieromonk Fotiy	"Canto della terra"	Ella Khrustaleva	—	—	—	—
Episode 8 (23 October)	Alexander Gradsky	5	Emil Kadyrov	"Не уходи"	Aleksandra Streltsova	—	—	—	—
Episode 8 (23 October)	Grigory Leps	6	Denis Sokolov	"Верни мою любовь"	Olga Zadonskaya	—	✔	—	—
Episode 8 (23 October)	Polina Gagarina	7	Ivan Dalmatov	"Don't Give Up"	Aleksandra Grekova	—	Team full	✔	—
Episode 9 (30 October)	Grigory Leps	1	Vitold Petrovskiy	"All for Love"	Rodion Gazmanov	—	Team full	—	—
Episode 9 (30 October)	Alexander Gradsky	2	Diana Saveleva	"Чорнобривцi"	Daniil Smirnov	—	Team full	—	—
Episode 9 (30 October)	Basta	3	Gabriella	"Кому? Зачем?"	Ekaterina Kokorina	—	Team full	—	—
Episode 9 (30 October)	Polina Gagarina	4	Ilona Solomonova	"Take Me to Church"	Konstantin Rabotov	—	Team full	—	✔
Episode 9 (30 October)	Grigory Leps	5	Renata Volkievich	"Опять метель"	Tatiana Shirko	—	Team full	✔	—
Episode 9 (30 October)	Basta	6	Nikolay Zabolotskikh	"Солдат любви"	Yulia Khusainova	—	Team full	Team full	—
Episode 9 (30 October)	Alexander Gradsky	7	Elena Minina	"All I Ask of You"	Aleksandr Postolenko	—	Team full	Team full	—
Episode 10 (6 November)	Alexander Gradsky	1	Mikhail Ozerov	"Jesus Christ Superstar"	Alina Perova	—	Team full	Team full	✔
Episode 10 (6 November)	Polina Gagarina	2	Yana Bashkireva	"Останусь"	Ekaterina Chistova	—	Team full	Team full	Team full
Episode 10 (6 November)	Alexander Gradsky	3	Elena Romanova	"Челита"	Georgiy Seryshev	—	Team full	Team full	Team full
Episode 10 (6 November)	Polina Gagarina	4	Semyon Velichko	"Ain't No Mountain High Enough"	Karina Tsvetkova	✔	Team full	Team full	Team full
Episode 10 (6 November)	Basta	5	Era Kann	"Туда"	Grigoriy Golubev	Team full	Team full	Team full	Team full
Episode 10 (6 November)	Grigory Leps	6	Olivia Krush	"Разные"	Rostislav Doronin	Team full	Team full	Team full	Team full
Episode 10 (6 November)	Basta	7	Yury Melikov	"Roses"	Anastasia Balakhnina	Team full	Team full	Team full	Team full

== The Knockouts ==
The Knockouts round started with episode 11 and ended with episode 13 (broadcast on 13, 20, 27 November 2016).

The top 24 contestants will then move on to the "Live Shows".

Colour key

Artist won the Khockout and advanced to the Quarterfinal
Artist lost the Knockout and eliminated

Episode	Coach	Order	Song	Winners	Loser	Song
Episode 11 (13 November)	Grigory Leps	1	"Не плачь"	Vitold Petrovskiy	Denis Sokolov	"Небо"
Episode 11 (13 November)	Grigory Leps	1	"Стена"	Renata Volkievich	Denis Sokolov	"Небо"
Episode 11 (13 November)	Basta	2	"Это здорово"	Nikolay Zabolotskikh	Binazir Ermaganbetova	"Hold On, We're Going Home"
Episode 11 (13 November)	Basta	2	"Love Me Again"	Yury Melikov	Binazir Ermaganbetova	"Hold On, We're Going Home"
Episode 11 (13 November)	Polina Gagarina	3	"I Wanna Dance with Somebody"	Olga Zadonskaya	Sevak Khanagyan	"Красиво"
Episode 11 (13 November)	Polina Gagarina	3	"Моя любовь"	Semyon Velichko	Sevak Khanagyan	"Красиво"
Episode 11 (13 November)	Alexander Gradsky	4	"All by Myself"	Tatiana Shirko	Nana Hattle	"To Be or Not to Be"
Episode 11 (13 November)	Alexander Gradsky	4	"Беда"	Alla Rid	Nana Hattle	"To Be or Not to Be"
Episode 12 (20 November)	Polina Gagarina	1	"Heaven"	Yana Bashkireva	Stanislav Obukhov	"Музыкант"
Episode 12 (20 November)	Polina Gagarina	1	"Мы разбиваемся"	Darya Bezhenar	Stanislav Obukhov	"Музыкант"
Episode 12 (20 November)	Grigory Leps	2	"Я помню чудное мгновенье"	Hieromonk Fotiy	Konstantin Rabotov	"Lay Me Down"
Episode 12 (20 November)	Grigory Leps	2	"Отпусти меня"	Olivia Krush	Konstantin Rabotov	"Lay Me Down"
Episode 12 (20 November)	Basta	3	"Zombie"/ "One of Us"	Era Kann	Karina Tsvetkova	"Верю я"
Episode 12 (20 November)	Basta	3	"Ты сделана из огня"	Sergey Urumyan	Karina Tsvetkova	"Верю я"
Episode 12 (20 November)	Alexander Gradsky	4	"Young and Beautiful"	Elena Romanova	Aleksandra Grekova	"Helter Skelter"
Episode 12 (20 November)	Alexander Gradsky	4	"То, что я должен сказать"	Elena Minina	Aleksandra Grekova	"Helter Skelter"
Episode 13 (27 November)	Grigory Leps	1	"What a Wonderful World"	Maria Kats	Alina Perova	"Cryin'"
Episode 13 (27 November)	Grigory Leps	1	"Не тревожь мне душу, скрипка"	Armen Avdzhan	Alina Perova	"Cryin'"
Episode 13 (27 November)	Basta	2	"Fallin'"	Maria Eroyan	Gabriella	"Jezebel"
Episode 13 (27 November)	Basta	2	"Шёлковое сердце"	Oleg Miami	Gabriella	"Jezebel"
Episode 13 (27 November)	Polina Gagarina	3	"Someone like You"	Ilona Solomonova	Regina Todorenko	"Highway to Hell"
Episode 13 (27 November)	Polina Gagarina	3	"Rock DJ"	Ivan Dalmatov	Regina Todorenko	"Highway to Hell"
Episode 13 (27 November)	Alexander Gradsky	4	"В твоих глазах" / "Ночное"	Mikhail Ozerov	Diana Saveleva	"Contigo en la distancia"
Episode 13 (27 November)	Alexander Gradsky	4	"Me and Bobby McGee"	Emil Kadyrov	Diana Saveleva	"Contigo en la distancia"

== Live shows ==
Colour key:

Artist was saved by Votes' summa
Artist was eliminated

=== Week 1, 2: Quarterfinals (4 and 11 December) ===
The Top 24 performed on Fridays, 4 and 11 December 2015. The two artists with the fewest votes from each team left the competition by the end of each episode.

Episode	Coach	Order	Artist	Song	Coach's vote (/100%)	Public's vote (/100%)	Votes' sum	Result
Episode 14 (4 December)	Alexander Gradsky	1	Elena Minina	"O mio babbino caro"	50%	51.8%	101.8%	Advanced
Episode 14 (4 December)	Alexander Gradsky	2	Alla Rid	"Ты меня любишь"	30%	16.2%	46.2%	Eliminated
Episode 14 (4 December)	Alexander Gradsky	3	Tatiana Shirko	"Верше мiй, верше"	20%	32%	52%	Eliminated
Episode 14 (4 December)	Polina Gagarina	4	Ivan Dalmatov	"Колыбельная"	50%	41.5%	91.5%	Advanced
Episode 14 (4 December)	Polina Gagarina	5	Darya Bezhenar	"Beat It"	30%	37.1%	67.1%	Eliminated
Episode 14 (4 December)	Polina Gagarina	6	Semyon Velichko	"Я ждал всю жизнь"	20%	21.4%	41.4%	Eliminated
Episode 14 (4 December)	Basta	7	Sergey Urumyan	"Ненавижу"	20%	21.9%	41.9%	Eliminated
Episode 14 (4 December)	Basta	8	Era Kann	"Сдаться ты всегда успеешь"	50%	57.3%	107.3%	Advanced
Episode 14 (4 December)	Basta	9	Yuri Melikov	"Uptown Funk"	30%	20.8%	50.8%	Eliminated
Episode 14 (4 December)	Grigory Leps	10	Olivia Krush	"Stairway to Heaven"	20%	14.7%	34.7%	Eliminated
Episode 14 (4 December)	Grigory Leps	11	Vitold Petrovskiy	"Georgia on My Mind"	50%	53.8%	103.8%	Advanced
Episode 14 (4 December)	Grigory Leps	12	Renata Volkievich	"Нас бьют, мы летаем"	30%	31.5%	61.5%	Eliminated
Episode 15 (11 December)
Episode 15 (11 December)	Basta	1	Nikolay Zabolotskikh	"Baila Morena"	30%	16.5%	46.5%	Eliminated
Episode 15 (11 December)	Basta	2	Maria Eroyan	"Арлекино"	50%	39%	89%	Advanced
Episode 15 (11 December)	Basta	3	Oleg Miami	"Жить в кайф"	20%	44.5%	64.5%	Eliminated
Episode 15 (11 December)	Alexander Gradsky	4	Mikhail Ozerov	"Hello"	50%	40.3%	90.3%	Advanced
Episode 15 (11 December)	Alexander Gradsky	5	Emil Kadyrov	"Синяя вечность"	20%	40.3%	60.3%	Eliminated
Episode 15 (11 December)	Alexander Gradsky	6	Elena Romanova	"Don't Cry for Me Argentina"	30%	19.4%	49.4%	Eliminated
Episode 15 (11 December)	Grigory Leps	7	Armen Avdzhan	"Я люблю тебя до слез"	30%	12.1%	42.1%	Eliminated
Episode 15 (11 December)	Grigory Leps	8	Maria Kats	"Aidishe Mame"	20%	5.2%	25.2%	Eliminated
Episode 15 (11 December)	Grigory Leps	9	Hieromonk Fotiy	"По дороге в Загорск"	50%	82.7%	132.7%	Advanced
Episode 15 (11 December)	Polina Gagarina	10	Yana Bashkireva	"I Have Nothing"	20%	31.2%	51.2%	Eliminated
Episode 15 (11 December)	Polina Gagarina	11	Ilona Solomonova	"Колыбельная"	30%	39.7%	69.7%	Eliminated
Episode 15 (11 December)	Polina Gagarina	12	Olga Zadonskaya	"Halo"	50%	29.1%	79.1%	Advanced

Non-competition performances
Order	Performers	Song
15.1	Eros Ramazzotti and Monica Hill	"Cose della vita"

=== Week 3: Semifinal (18 December) ===
The Top 8 performed on Friday, 18 December 2015. The one artists with the fewest votes from each team left the competition by the end of the night.

Episode	Coach	Order	Artist	Song	Coach's vote (/100%)	Public's vote (/100%)	Votes' sum	Result
Episode 16 (18 December)	Polina Gagarina	1	Ivan Dalmatov	"Relax" / "What Is Love"	40%	59.5%	99.5%	Eliminated
Episode 16 (18 December)	Polina Gagarina	2	Olga Zadonskaya	"Обещание"	60%	40.5%	100.5%	Advanced
Episode 16 (18 December)	Alexander Gradsky	3	Elena Minina	"Песня Анюты"	60%	38.7%	98.7%	Eliminated
Episode 16 (18 December)	Alexander Gradsky	4	Mikhail Ozerov	"Любовь"	40%	68.3%	101.3%	Advanced
Episode 16 (18 December)	Grigory Leps	5	Vitold Petrovskiy	"Быстрее"	40%	20.8%	60.8%	Eliminated
Episode 16 (18 December)	Grigory Leps	6	Hieromonk Fotiy	"Реквием"	60%	79.2%	139.2%	Advanced
Episode 16 (18 December)	Basta	7	Era Kann	"Turning Tables"	60%	45.6%	105.6%	Advanced
Episode 16 (18 December)	Basta	8	Maria Eroyan	"А напоследок я скажу"	40%	54.4%	94.4%	Eliminated

Non-competition performances
Order	Performers	Song
16.1	Dima Bilan, Ivan Dalmatov, and Olga Zadonskaya	"Не молчи"
16.2	Dina Garipova, Elena Minina, and Mikhail Ozerov	"Writing's on the Wall"
16.3	Olga Kormukhina, Vitold Petrovskiy, and Hieromonk Fotiy	"Caruso"
16.4	Bi-2, Era Kann, and Maria Eroyan	"Полковнику никто не пишет"

=== Week 4: Final (December 25) ===
The Top 4 performed on Friday, 25 December 2015. This week, the four finalists performed two solo cover songs and a duet with their coach.

Coach	Artist	Order	Duet Song (with Coach)	Order	Solo Song (no.1)	Order	Solo Song (no.2)	Result	
Basta	Era Kann	1	"Я и ты"	5	"Тёмная ночь"	Eliminated		Fourth place	
Polina Gagarina	Olga Zadonskaya	2	"Кукушка"	6	"I Will Survive"	9	"Спектакль окончен"	Third place	
Alexander Gradsky	Mikhail Ozerov	3	"Как молоды мы были"	7	"Unchained Melody"	10	"К стеклу прильнув лицом"	24%	Runner-up
Grigory Leps	Hieromonk Fotiy	4	"Лабиринт"	8	"Per te"	11	"Спокойной ночи, господа"	76%	Winner

Non-competition performances
Order	Performer	Song
17.1	Sabina Mustaeva, Lev Akselrod, Arina Danilova, Matvey Semishkur, Alisa Kozhikina, Mikhail Smirnov, Aleksey Zabugin, Elizaveta Puris, Irakliy Intskirvelli, and Ragda Khanieva	"Last Christmas"
17.2	Era Kann	"Don't Speak"
17.3	Hieromonk Fotiy (winner)	"Per te"
17.4	All artists of the 4th season	"Последний час декабря"

== Reception ==
=== Rating ===
Episode		Original airdate	Production	Time slot (UTC+3)	Audience		Source
Episode		Original airdate	Production	Time slot (UTC+3)	Rating	Share	Source
1	"The Blind Auditions Premiere"	September 4, 2015	401	Friday 9:30 p.m.	8.4	30.6%	
2	"The Blind Auditions, Part 2"	September 11, 2015	402	Friday 9:30 p.m.	7.3	27.1%	
3	"The Blind Auditions, Part 3"	September 18, 2015	403	Friday 9:30 p.m.	7.2	25.2%	
4	"The Blind Auditions, Part 4"	September 25, 2015	404	Friday 9:30 p.m.	6.6	24.4%	
5	"The Blind Auditions, Part 5"	October 2, 2015	405	Friday 9:30 p.m.	7.0	24%	
6	"The Blind Auditions, Part 6"	October 9, 2015	406	Friday 9:30 p.m.	7.7	23.9%	
7	"The Battles Premiere"	October 16, 2015	407	Friday 9:30 p.m.	7.5	24.3%	
8	"The Battles, Part 2"	October 23, 2015	408	Friday 9:30 p.m.	7.2	22.9%	
9	"The Battles, Part 3"	October 30, 2015	409	Friday 9:30 p.m.	6.8	22.1%	
10	"The Battles, Part 4"	November 6, 2015	410	Friday 9:30 p.m.	6.5	20.4%	
11	"The Knocĸouts Premiere"	November 13, 2015	411	Friday 9:30 p.m.	6.5	20.2%	
12	"The Knockouts, Part 2"	November 20, 2015	412	Friday 9:30 p.m.	6.5	20.4%	
13	"The Knockouts, Part 3"	November 27, 2015	413	Friday 9:30 p.m.	6.1	19.1%	
14	"Live Quarterfinal 1"	December 4, 2015	414	Friday 9:30 p.m.	5.7	18.7%	
15	"Live Quarterfinal 2"	December 11, 2015	415	Friday 9:30 p.m.	5.5	18.1%	
16	"Live Semifinal"	December 18, 2015	416	Friday 9:30 p.m.	6.0	19.2%	
17	"Live Season Final"	December 25, 2015	417	Friday 9:30 p.m.	6.6	20.8%	
