= Charles Lightfoot =

English cricketer (born 1976)

Personal information
- Full name: Charles Gordon Rufus Lightfoot
- Born: 25 February 1976 (age 50); Amersham, Buckinghamshire, England
- Batting: Left-handed
- Bowling: Slow left-arm orthodox

Domestic team information
- Years: Team
- 1996–1998: Oxford University

Career statistics
Competition	First-class
Matches	16
Runs scored	402
Batting average	16.75
100s/50s	–/1
Top score	61
Balls bowled	521
Wickets	4
Bowling average	96.75
5 wickets in innings	–
10 wickets in match	–
Best bowling	2/65
Catches/stumpings	3/–
- Source: Cricinfo, 9 March 2020

Charles Gordon Rufus Lightfoot (born 25 February 1976) is an English lawyer and former first-class cricketer.

Lightfoot was born at Amersham in February 1976. He was educated at Eton College, before going up to Keble College, Oxford. While studying at Oxford, he played first-class cricket for Oxford University, making his debut against Northamptonshire at Oxford in 1996. He played first-class for Oxford until 1998, making sixteen appearances. He scored a total of 402 runs at an average of 16.75, with a high score of 61. With his slow left-arm orthodox bowling, he took 4 wickets with best figures of 2 for 65. He is a partner at the London office of Cooley where he is an advocate in the English High Court.

Lightfoot is married to CeCe Sammy.
