= CeCe Sammy =

British vocal and performance coach

CeCe Sammy-Lightfoot
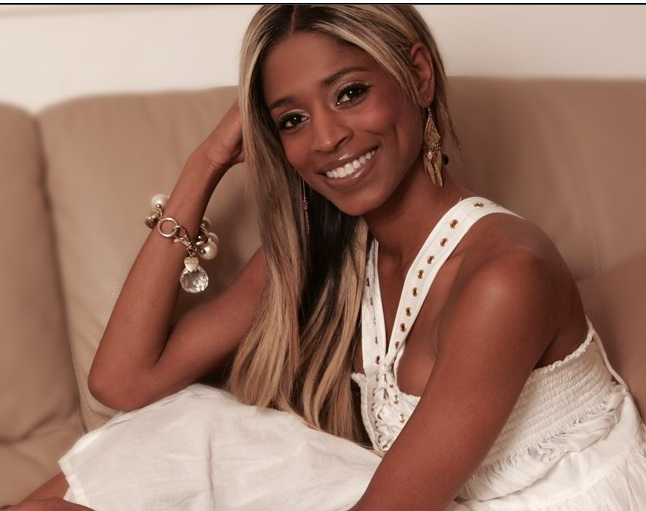
- Born: 30 May 1977 (age 49); Port of Spain, Trinidad and Tobago
- Other name: CeCe Sammy
- Education: London College of Music
- Occupations: Vocal coach, singer-songwriter, television presenter, author
- Notable work: If You Can Speak, You Can Sing
- Television: Pop Idol, American Idol, America's Got Talent, The Voice UK
- Spouse: Charles Lightfoot
- Children: 2
- Website: CeCe Sammy's official website

CeCe Sammy-Lightfoot (born 30 May 1977) is a British vocal and performance coach, singer-songwriter and television presenter. She has appeared on various television shows, including S Club Search (2001), Pop Idol (2001–2003), American Idol (2002–present) The X Factor: Battle of the Stars (2006), Just the Two of Us (2006-2007), The Choir (2006-2016), America's Got Talent (2006-present), The Voice UK (2012–present) and Get Your Act Together (2015).

She was the chairperson of the British jury for the Eurovision Song Contest 2016, and was a judge the following year for Eurovision: You Decide 2017. For Eurovision 2023, she was a panellist on the BBC One countdown show Everyone's a Winner.

== Career ==
=== 1990s and 2000s: Early career ===
Sammy is a graduate of the London College of Music, and is a classically trained pianist. Her classical training led her to coach charting acts from the United Kingdom, including Charlotte Church, S Club 7 and S Club Juniors, Will Young and Leona Lewis.

Prior to coaching, Sammy began her career as a backing singer, touring with the likes of Diana Ross and Julio Iglesias. She was also a member of the United Colours of Sound with vocal coach partner John Modi and celebrity vocal coaches David and Carrie Grant. She has sung at the Commonwealth Games and Buckingham Palace, as well as recording several theme tunes for ITV, Channel 4 and Sky Sports, including the official Rugby World Cup song "Swing Low" with UB40, before going on to become a vocal coach to a roster of celebrity clients, such as Sting and One Direction.

Sammy appeared on the television series Pop Idol as a vocal coach, and was a judge on the BBC's celebrity duet show Just the Two of Us in 2006 and 2007 along with Stewart Copeland and Tito Jackson.

She appeared in the BBC TV documentary Be My Baby - The Girl Group Story which aired in August 2006. The show covered the history of girl groups, focusing specifically on The Supremes, The Three Degrees, Sister Sledge, Bananarama, The Bangles and the Spice Girls.

In 2007 Sammy was a judge on BBC Radio 3's Choir of the Year competition. She was one of Bruno Tonioli's panellists on BBC One's DanceX.

She made a guest appearance on ITV's Dancing on Ice in early 2009, where she was seen helping one of the groups that were selected to skate and sing at the same time. She has also appeared as a guest on television and in documentaries, including The Wright Stuff, GMTV, BBC Breakfast, Let Me Entertain You, and The Xtra Factor.

=== 2010s: Celebrity vocal coach, American Idol and America's Got Talent ===
In 2010, Sammy founded an artist development and music management company with artist manager Frank DiLeo. CCA Entertainment operates between London and Los Angeles.

In 2014 and 2015, Sammy appeared as head vocal coach and judge on the second and third seasons of Endemol's Your Face Sounds Familiar Georgia. She reprised the role as vocal judge for a select number of episodes during the fourth season, which started in May 2015.

In 2015, Sammy worked as a vocal coach on the new ITV series Get Your Act Together. She has been a regular talent consultant for American Idol and America's Got Talent. She also was the official vocal coach for 2015 Dubai Music Week.

In 2017, Sammy worked with manufacturer VTech to launch the Kidi Super Star, a karaoke microphone and stand which reduces the vocals on any song. The system features coaching from Sammy.

In 2018, she worked as a vocal coach on two films, the Idris Elba-directed Yardie and Gurinder Chadha's Blinded by the Light.

In February 2019, Sammy released her debut book, If You Can Speak You Can Sing, through Eyewear Publishing.

Also in 2019, BBC launched the "Bring the Noise" campaign, for which Sammy was a BBC Ambassador and gave her top tips for teaching singing to primary school children and teachers.

=== 2020s: Masterclass ===
In February 2022, Sammy launched and created a short, free Masterclass series online called "Hack Your Voice" to support interviews, during which she shares some of the key lessons she learned as a professional vocal coach.

== Personal life ==
Sammy was born in Port of Spain, Trinidad and Tobago, home of the biggest carnival in the Caribbean. She grew up obsessed with Soca music until, one day, she spotted flamboyant piano impresario Liberace on the TV, which inspired her to learn to play the piano.

She married Charles Lightfoot.

Sammy has two children, her biological daughter Isabella and the stepson of her husband, Tristan.
