= The Voice of Greece season 1 =

The Voice of Greece
- Season 1
- Hosted by: Giorgos Liagkas; Themis Georgantas
- Coaches: Michalis Kouinelis; Despina Vandi; Antonis Remos; Melina Aslanidou
- Winner: Maria Elena Kiriakou
- Winning coach: Despina Vandi
- Runner-up: Areti Kosmidou

Release
- Original network: ANT1
- Original release: January 10 – May 9, 2014

Season chronology
- Next → Season 2

The first season of the Greek Cypriot reality talent show The Voice of Greece premiered on January 10, 2014, on ANT1. Based on the reality singing competition The Voice of Holland, the series was created by Dutch television producer John de Mol. It is part of an international series.

The show is hosted by Giorgos Liagkas with Themis Georgantas serving as the backstage and social networking corresponding. The lead vocalist of the band Stavento, Michalis Kouinelis, Despina Vandi, Antonis Remos and Melina Aslanidou are the coaches of the season. The winner receives a record deal with Minos EMI.

== Auditions, coaches and hosts ==
The first trailer for the season came out on September 13, 2013, which officially opened the submissions for the auditions. The auditions started on September 30, 2013, and were held in Greece and Cyprus.

Several artists were rumored to be part of the judging panel once ANT1 announced the show. Anna Vissi and Vandi were the first to be rumored as they are two of the biggest singers in both Cyprus and Greece. After being a judge on Dancing on Ice, Elena Paparizou was in the running for the judging panel. On the running were also Marinella, Remos and Nikos Karvelas. Remos and Vandi were the first to be confirmed as coaches followed by Kouinelis from Stavento and Aslanidou. Teasers from each coach talking about the show were shown on January 5, 2014, just five days before the premiere.

Natalia Germanou was unofficially confirmed to be the host of the show. However, it was later revealed that she had a proposition for the judging panel which was later turned down by the broadcaster after it was decided that the judges will be only professional singers. A few days after the unofficial confirmation, Sakis Rouvas, who also hosted the Greek version of The X Factor, was rumored to be the host of the show. On December 5, 2013, the broadcaster revealed that Liagkas will be hosting the show with Georgantas being the V reporter.

== Promotion ==
The first trailer premiered in September 2013 announcing the season and explaining how to participate. Four short trailers were broadcast in early-December, teasing the show and its format. A few weeks before the premiere of the season, a trailer which featured the coaches going to the stage from backstage and a singer auditioning. All the four coaches hit their buttons, with Vandi and Remos being the first two followed by Kouinellis and Aslanidou the same time. The premiere date was announced on the second version of the same changed trailer. Along with that trailer four short trailers were shown with each coach talking about the show and their expectations.

The trailer for the battles was shown when the blind auditions where over, on February 24, 2014. It featured two singers going to the stage–ring, shooting each other with their microphones.

== Teams ==
Each coach of the season had, after the blind auditions, sixteen acts in his team. During the battles each coach lost half of his acts. During the live shows, the coaches were losing two (first and second live) or one act (third to fifth live) until the final live where each coach had one act.

Color key

- Winner
- Runner-up
- Third place
- Fourth place
- Eliminated in the Live shows
- Eliminated in the Battles

Coaches	Top 64 artists			
Michalis Kouinelis				
Michalis Kouinelis	Areti Kosmidou	Yuri Melikov	Panayiotis Vintzilaios	Tasos Panagiotopoulos
Michalis Kouinelis	Dimitra Dimitrakopoulou	Steven Anderito	Aris Kambanos	Violeta Christina Dagkalou
Michalis Kouinelis	Constantina Christopoulou	Iordanis Karakasidis	Panayiotis Koufogiannis	Panos Patagiannis
Michalis Kouinelis	Constantina Zerva	Antigoni Tsiplakidi	Christina Miliou	Elias Vlachakis
Despina Vandi				
Despina Vandi	Maria Elena Kiriakou	Katerina Lioliou	Stelios Mayalios	Dimitris Fournarakis
Despina Vandi	Elpida Papakosma	Nikos Mpaliakos	Vasilis Axiotis	Eleni Geragidi
Despina Vandi	Maro Liapi	Maria Egglezou	Panagiotis Alafouzos	Elena Stratigopoulou
Despina Vandi	Stelios Karpathakis	Pavlos Dounis	Maria Vlachava	Eva Kanata
Antonis Remos				
Antonis Remos	Lefteris Kintatos	Alex Economou	Georgina Karachaliou	Dimos Mpeke
Antonis Remos	Natasa Veneti	Fani Tselepi	Evelina Nikoliza	Dimitris Tiktopoulos
Antonis Remos	Vera Boufi	Dimitris Marmarinos	Athina Georgopoulou	Katerina Sousoula Souarez
Antonis Remos	Aggelos Mpoutakidis	Ioanna Tsagkari	Kelly Protopappa	Haris Mosaidis
Melina Aslanidou				
Melina Aslanidou	Emily Charalambous	Vasilis Chatzipartalis	Anna Maria Bilida	Ifigenia Atkinson
Melina Aslanidou	Eirini Kalamaraki	Irwan Easty	Aggeliki Zika	Mary Doutsi
Melina Aslanidou	Marianna Rosalind MacKrell	Giorgos Pappas	Maria Mouratidou	Mavrikios Mavrikiou
Melina Aslanidou	Christina Makri	Giorgos Gkekas	Panos Togkaridis	Nicki Pappa

== Blind auditions ==
The blind auditions took place in the Kapa Studios in Spata, Attica. Each coach had the length of the artists' performance to decide if they wanted that artist on their team. If two or more coaches have wanted the same artist, then the artist chose their coach. If only one wanted the artist, then the artist was defaulted in his team. Once the coaches picked their team, they pitted them against each other in the Battles.

The blind auditions episodes were aired on Fridays since January 10, 2014 until February 21, 2014 with the last blind audition being aired on Sunday, February 23, 2014.

Color key

✔	Coach hit his/her "ΣΕ ΘΕΛΩ (I want you)" button
	Artist defaulted to this coach's team
	Artist elected to join this coach's team
	Artist eliminated with no coach pressing his or her "ΣΕ ΘΕΛΩ (I want you)" button

=== Episode 1 (January 10) ===
The first blind audition episode was broadcast on January 10, 2014.

- Group performance: The Voice of Greece coaches – Medley of "Me Mia Agalia Tragoudia", "Den Eho Diefthinsi", "Iparhi Zoi", "Ine Stigmes", "Pidao Ta Kimata"

Order	Artist	Age	Hometown	Song	Coach's and contestant's choices			
Order	Artist	Age	Hometown	Song	Michalis	Despina	Antonis	Melina
1	Katerina Lioliou	19	Thessaloniki, Macedonia	"Dream On"	✔	✔	✔	✔
2	Lefteris Kindatos	32	Athens, Attica	"Feggari Mou Chlomo"	—	✔	✔	✔
3	Manos Takkos	22	Athens, Attica	"S'Agapo (Ah Peristeri Mou)"	—	—	—	—
4	Anna Maria Bilida	25	Tripoli, Peloponnese	"To Metrima"	—	✔	✔	✔
5	Alex Economou	25	Paphos, Cyprus	"Make You Feel My Love"	✔	✔	✔	✔
6	Katerina Ktisti	19	Athens, Attica	"Poses Hiliades Kalokairia"	—	—	—	—
7	Panagiotis Koufogiannis	26	Nicosia, Cyprus	"This Love"	✔	—	—	—
8	Stelios Mayalios	30	Oxya, Thessaly	"How You Remind Me"	✔	✔	✔	✔
9	Nikos Nikolaidis	31	Aspropyrgos, Attica	"Tesseris"	—	—	—	—
10	Dimitra Dimitrakopoulou	28	Athens, Attica	"Love the Way You Lie"	✔	—	—	—

=== Episode 2 (January 17) ===
The second blind audition episode was broadcast on January 17, 2014.

Order	Artist	Age	Hometown	Song	Coach's and contestant's choices			
Order	Artist	Age	Hometown	Song	Michalis	Despina	Antonis	Melina
1	Panayiotis Vintzilaios	26	Naxos, South Aegean	"Billie Jean"	✔	✔	✔	✔
2	Elena Stratigopoulou	24	Kalamata, Peloponnese	"Whole Lotta Love"	✔	✔	✔	✔
3	Dimos Beke	40	Ammochostos, Cyprus	"Rolling in the Deep"	✔	✔	✔	✔
4	Stamatina Kanta	29	Athens, Attica	"Young and Beautiful"	—	—	—	—
5	Dimitris Fournarakis	21	Athens, Attica	"Ola S'agapane"	—	✔	—	—
6	Irwan Easty	29	Athens, Attica	"Somebody Told Me"	—	✔	—	✔
7	Marianna Tsala	24	Chalcis, Euboea	"Getting Away with It"	—	—	—	—
8	Emily Charalambous	16	Paralimni, Cyprus	"Anthropoi Monaxoi"	✔	✔	✔	✔
9	Nicki Pappa	31	Athens, Attica	"Na M'afiseis Isixi Thelo"	—	—	—	✔
10	Georgia Dimou	34	Athens, Attica	"Apenanti"	—	—	—	—
11	Aris Kambanos	23	Athens, Attica	"Poios na Sigkrithei Mazi Sou"	✔	—	—	—

=== Episode 3 (January 24) ===
The third blind audition episode was broadcast on January 24, 2014.

Order	Artist	Age	Hometown	Song	Coach's and contestant's choices			
Order	Artist	Age	Hometown	Song	Michalis	Despina	Antonis	Melina
1	Aggelos Mpoutakidis	23	Alexandreia, Imathia	"Pou Na'sai"	✔	✔	✔	✔
2	Natasa Veneti	22	Athens, Attica	"Nobody's Wife"	✔	—	✔	✔
3	Christos Santikai	19	Athens, Attica	"An Eisai Ena Asteri"	—	—	—	—
4	Vasilis Axiotis	34	Arta, Epirus	"The Show Must Go On"	✔	✔	✔	✔
5	Yuri Melikov	16	Ammochostos, Cyprus	"Delilah"	✔	—	—	—
6	Eirini Kalamaraki	21	Athens, Attica	"Me Ta Matia Kleista"	✔	✔	—	✔
7	Pavlos Dounis	26	Thessaloniki, Macedonia	"Feggaria Xartina"	—	✔	—	✔
8	Giorgos Giakoumakis	29	Heraklion, Crete	"Den Se Xreiazomai"	—	—	—	—
9	Maria Elena Kiriakou	29	Larnaca, Cyprus	"Because of You"	✔	✔	✔	✔
10	Ioanna Poliviou	28	Larnaca, Cyprus	"Distixos"	—	—	—	—
11	Fani Tselepi	22	Volos, Thessaly	"To Lathos"	✔	✔	✔	✔

=== Episode 4 (January 31) ===
The fourth blind audition episode was broadcast on January 31, 2014.

Order	Artist	Age	Hometown	Song	Coach's and contestant's choices			
Order	Artist	Age	Hometown	Song	Michalis	Despina	Antonis	Melina
1	Mavrikios Mavrikiou	23	Lemesos, Cyprus	"Poso S'agapo"	✔	✔	—	✔
2	Constantina Christopoulou	23	Athens, Attica	"Back to Black"	✔	—	—	—
3	Georgina Karachaliou	33	Athens, Attica	"Whole Lotta Love"	✔	✔	✔	✔
4	Panagiota Kapsali	21	Athens, Attica	"Fuckin' Perfect"	—	—	—	—
5	Eleni Geragidi	21	Athens, Attica	"Addicted to love"	—	✔	—	—
6	Valia Dimou	20	Thessaloniki, Macedonia	"Trava Skandali"	—	—	—	—
7	Steven Anderito	18	Athens, Attica	"Price Tag"	✔	✔	✔	✔
8	Elias Vlachakis	26	Sparta, Laconia	"This Love"	✔	—	—	—
9	Violeta Christina Dagkalou	19	Volos, Thessaly	"Makria Mou Na Figeis"	✔	—	—	—
10	Andreas Prekas	41	Athens, Attica	"Na Ksanartheis"	—	—	—	—
11	Panos Togkaridis	34	Piraeus, Attica	"Cheimonanthos"	—	✔	—	✔

=== Episode 5 (February 7) ===
The fifth blind audition episode was broadcast on February 7, 2014.

Order	Artist	Age	Hometown	Song	Coach's and contestant's choices			
Order	Artist	Age	Hometown	Song	Michalis	Despina	Antonis	Melina
1	Evelina Nikoliza	25	Athens, Attica	"Someone like You"	—	✔	✔	✔
2	Dimitris Marmarinos	23	Piraeus, Attica	"Long Train Runnin'"	—	—	✔	✔
3	Eva Kanata	31	Alexandroupoli, Thrace	"To S'agapo Mporei"	—	✔	—	—
4	Maria Arni	21	Chalkidiki	"Zilia Mou"	—	—	—	—
5	Maria Egglezou	31	Karditsa, Thessaly	"Na M'agapas"	✔	✔	✔	✔
6	Marianna Rosalind MacKrell	23	Athens, Attica	"Born This Way"	—	—	—	✔
7	Elpida Papakosma	20	Thessaloniki, Macedonia	"What's Up?"	—	✔	—	—
8	Vasilis Chatzipartalis	35	Athens, Attica	"Sinnefa tou Gialou"	✔	—	✔	✔
9	Christina Miliou	26	Athens, Attica	"Ta Leme (Bastardo)"	✔	—	—	✔
10	Giannis Mitilinaios	26	Athens, Attica	"Ennoeitai"	—	—	—	—
11	Aggeliki Zika	42	Athens, Attica	"Stereotipa"	✔	✔	✔	✔

=== Episode 6 (February 14) ===
The sixth blind audition episode was broadcast on February 14, 2014.

Order	Artist	Age	Hometown	Song	Coach's and contestant's choices			
Order	Artist	Age	Hometown	Song	Michalis	Despina	Antonis	Melina
1	Antigoni Tsiplakidi	43	Athens, Attica	"Respect"	✔	✔	✔	✔
2	Haris Mosaidis	25	Kilkis, Macedonia	"Apologize"	—	✔	✔	—
3	Nikos Mpaliakos	26	Paphos, Cyprus	"Impossible"	—	✔	—	—
4	Maro Liapi	24	Argos, Peloponnese	"Me Ta Matia Kleista"	—	✔	—	—
5	Panagiotis Alafouzos	28	Chalcis, Euboea	"Prigkipessa"	—	✔	—	—
6	Ioanna Pepeta	21	Mykonos, Cyclades	"Taxidi Sti Vrohi"	—	—	—	—
7	Mary Doutsi	28	Naousa, Imathia	"I Agapi Argi"	—	—	✔	✔
8	Alexandra Varsami	24	Athens, Attica	"Kiss from a Rose"	—	—	—	—
9	Constantina Zerva	20	Kalamata, Peloponnese	"Dinata"	✔	—	—	—
10	Nina Koumi	23	Athens, Attica	"Tis Diskoles Stigmes"	—	—	—	—
11	Katerina Sousoula Souarez	21	Athens, Attica	"Kookoobadi"	—	—	✔	✔
12	Maria Mouratidou	21	Kavala, Macedonia	"The Greatest Love of All"	—	—	—	✔

=== Episode 7 (February 21) ===
The seventh blind audition episode was broadcast on February 21, 2014.

Order	Artist	Age	Hometown	Song	Coach's and contestant's choices			
Order	Artist	Age	Hometown	Song	Michalis	Despina	Antonis	Melina
1	Kelly Protopappa	27	Athens, Attica	"Ta Leme (Bastardo)"	✔	✔	✔	✔
2	Ifigenia Atkinson	26	Athens, Attica	"Set Fire to the Rain	✔	—	—	✔
3	Tasos Panagiotopoulos	23	Kavala, Macedonia	"Trouble"	✔	✔	✔	✔
4	Vera Boufi	25	Athens, Attica	"Oi Filoi Mou Xaramata"	—	—	✔	—
5	Giorgos Pappas	37	Preveza, Epirus	"Kalokairia Kai Xeimones"	—	✔	—	✔
6	Anna Makridis	25	Lemesos, Cyprus	"Steppin' Stone"	—	—	—	—
7	Athina Georgopoulou	32	Athens, Attica	"Fotia Sta Savatovrada"	—	—	✔	—
8	Stathoula Kapakli	31	Chalcis, Euboea	"Venzinadiko"	—	—	—	—
9	Christina Makri	20	Agrinio, Aetolia-Acarnania	"To Metrima"	✔	—	✔	✔
10	Michalis Karagounis	21	Thessaloniki, Macedonia	"Emeina Edo"	—	—	—	—
11	Stelios Karpathakis	47	Athens, Attica	"You Give Love a Bad Name"	—	✔	—	—

=== Episode 8 (February 23) ===
The eighth and last blind audition episode was broadcast on February 23, 2014.

Order	Artist	Age	Hometown	Song	Coach's and contestant's choices			
Order	Artist	Age	Hometown	Song	Michalis	Despina	Antonis	Melina
1	Dimitris Tiktopoulos	33	Thessaloniki, Macedonia	"We Are the Champions"	✔	✔	✔	✔
2	Katerina Kabanelli	18	Lemesos, Cyprus	"Hallelujah"	—	—	—	—
3	Giorgos Gkekas	24	Naupactus, Aetolia-Acarnania	"Wild Is the Wind"	✔	✔	✔	✔
4	Ioanna Karanika	21	Heraklion, Crete	"To Lathos"	—	—	—	N/A
5	Mika Darmani	30	Athens, Attica	"Blue Jeans"	—	—	—	N/A
6	Ioanna Tsagkari	27	Athens, Attica	"Mad About You"	✔	—	✔	N/A
7	Panos Patagiannis	30	Athens, Attica	"The Greatest Love of All"	✔	—	N/A	N/A
8	Areti Kosmidou	16	Alexandroupoli, Thrace	"Let Her Go"	✔	✔	N/A	N/A
9	Iordanis Karakasidis	21	Thessaloniki, Macedonia	"Caruso"	✔	—	N/A	N/A
10	Maria Vlachava	30	Kozani, Macedonia	"To Patoma"	N/A	✔	N/A	N/A

== The Battles ==
The Battles took place in the Kapa Studios in Spata, Attica. Two artists from each team compete against by singing the same song. The coach of the two acts decides which one will go through and which one will be eliminated meaning that eight acts from each team will get through the live shows. The battle advisors for these episodes were: Christos Sumka working with Antonis Remos, Dimitris Kontopoulos working with Despina Vandi, Dimos Anastasiadis working with Michalis Kouinelis and Antonis Mitzelos working with Melina Aslanidou.

The Battles episodes started airing on Friday February 28, 2014 and will end on Friday March 21, 2014 after four episodes with eight battles taking place in each one.

Color key

✔	Artist won the Battle
	Artist lost the Battle and was eliminated

=== Episode 1 (February 28) ===
The first battle round episode was broadcast on February 28, 2014.

Order	Coach	Artists		Song
1	Despina Vandi	Maria Elena Kiriakou	Eva Kanata	"Hero"
2	Antonis Remos	Dimos Mpeke	Haris Mosaidis	"Feeling Good"
3	Melina Aslanidou	Mary Doutsi	Nicki Pappa	"I Agapi Ine Zali"
4	Michalis Kouinelis	Panayiotis Vintzilaios	Elias Vlachakis	"Summer of '69"
5	Despina Vandi	Vasilis Axiotis	Maria Vlachava	"The Way You Make Me Feel"
6	Antonis Remos	Natasa Veneti	Kelly Protopappa	"En Lefko"
7	Melina Aslanidou	Aggeliki Zika	Panos Togkaridis	"Prin To Telos"
8	Michalis Kouinelis	Areti Kosmidou	Christina Miliou	"I Was Made for Lovin' You"

=== Episode 2 (March 7) ===
The second battle round episode was broadcast on March 7, 2014.

Order	Coach	Artists		Song
1	Michalis Kouinelis	Dimitra Dimitrakopoulou	Antigoni Tsiplakidi	"An S'arnitho Agapi Mou"
2	Despina Vandi	Nikos Mpaliakos	Pavlos Dounis	"Eleges"
3	Antonis Remos	Georgina Karachaliou	Ioanna Tsagkari	"My Kind of Love"
4	Melina Aslanidou	Ifigenia Atkinson	Giorgos Gkekas	"Kids"
5	Michalis Kouinelis	Violeta Christina Dagkalou	Constantina Zerva	"Di'Efxon"
6	Despina Vandi	Stelios Mayalios	Stelios Karpathakis	"Love Me Again"
7	Antonis Remos	Lefteris Kintatos	Aggelos Mpoutakidis	"Otan Exo Esena"
8	Melina Aslanidou	Emily Charalambous	Christina Makri	"Dio Meres Mono"

=== Episode 3 (March 14) ===
The third battle round episode was broadcast on March 14, 2014.

Order	Coach	Artists		Song
1	Antonis Remos	Alex Economou	Katerina Sousoula Souarez	"Broken Strings"
2	Melina Aslanidou	Vasilis Chatzipartalis	Mavrikios Mavrikiou	"San Star Tou Cinema"
3	Michalis Kouinelis	Yuri Melikov	Panos Patagiannis	"It's Now or Never"
4	Despina Vandi	Katerina Lioliou	Elena Stratigopoulou	"Wrecking Ball"
5	Antonis Remos	Evelina Nikoliza	Athina Georgopoulou	"An Mou Tilephonouses/Dodeka"
6	Melina Aslanidou	Anna Maria Bilida	Maria Mouratidou	"Trava Skandali"
7	Michalis Kouinelis	Steven Anderito	Panagiotis Koufogiannis	"Locked Out of Heaven"
8	Despina Vandi	Dimitris Fournarakis	Panagiotis Alafouzos	"Etsi Ksafnika"

=== Episode 4 (March 21) ===
The fourth and last battle round episode was broadcast on March 21, 2014.

Order	Coach	Artists		Song
1	Melina Aslanidou	Eirini Kalamaraki	Giorgos Pappas	"Ego Ki Esi"
2	Michalis Kouinelis	Aris Kambanos	Iordanis Karakasidis	"Poia Nixta S'eklepse"
3	Despina Vandi	Eleni Geragidi	Maria Egglezou	"O Aggelos Mou"
4	Antonis Remos	Dimitris Tiktopoulos	Dimitris Marmarinos	"Let Me Entertain You"
5	Melina Aslanidou	Irwan Easty	Marianna Rosalind MacKrell	"Don't Go Breaking My Heart"
6	Michalis Kouinelis	Tasos Panagiotopoulos	Constantina Christopoulou	"Just Give Me a Reason"
7	Despina Vandi	Elpida Papakosma	Maro Liapi	"Read All About It"
8	Antonis Remos	Fani Tselepi	Vera Boufi	"Gia Ena Tango"

== Live shows ==
=== Results summary ===
Color key
Artist's info

- Artist from "Team Stavento"
- Artist from "Team Vandi"
- Artist from "Team Remos"
- Artist from "Team Aslanidou"

Result details

- Artist was proclaimed as the winner
- Artist was saved by the public
- Artist was saved by his/her coach
- Artist was eliminated
- Artist received the highest accumulated total points and was saved
- Artist received the fewest accumulated total points and was eliminated
- Artist received the fewest of the public's vote and was eliminated
- Artist did not perform on that particular week

Artist	Week 1	Week 2	Week 3	Week 4	Week 5	Week 6	
Artist	Week 1	Week 2	Week 3	Week 4	Week 5	Round 1	Round 2
Maria Elena Kiriakou		Safe	Safe	Safe	Safe	Safe	Winner
Areti Kosmidou		Safe	Safe	Bottom two	Safe	Safe	Runner-up
Lefteris Kintatos	Bottom three		Safe	Bottom two	Safe	Safe	Third place
Emily Charalambous	Safe		Safe	Safe	Safe	Fourth place	Eliminated (Week 6)
Vasilis Chatzipartalis		Bottom three	Bottom two	Bottom two	Eliminated	Eliminated (Week 5)	
Katerina Lioliou	Safe		Bottom two	Bottom two	Eliminated	Eliminated (Week 5)	
Alex Economou	Safe		Safe	Safe	Eliminated	Eliminated (Week 5)	
Yuri Melikov	Safe		Safe	Safe	Eliminated	Eliminated (Week 5)	
Anna Maria Bilida		Safe	Safe	Bottom two	Eliminated (Week 4)		
Stelios Mayalios		Bottom three	Safe	Bottom two	Eliminated (Week 4)		
Georgina Karachaliou		Bottom three	Bottom two	Bottom two	Eliminated (Week 4)		
Panayiotis Vintzilaios	Bottom three		Bottom two	Bottom two	Eliminated (Week 4)		
Ifigenia Atkinson	Bottom three		Bottom two	Eliminated (Week 3)			
Dimitris Fournarakis	Bottom three		Bottom two	Eliminated (Week 3)			
Dimos Mpeke		Safe	Bottom two	Eliminated (Week 3)			
Tasos Panagiotopoulos		Bottom three	Bottom two	Eliminated (Week 3)			
Elpida Papakosma		Bottom three	Eliminated (Week 2)				
Nikos Mpaliakos		Bottom three	Eliminated (Week 2)				
Dimitra Dimitrakopoulou		Bottom three	Eliminated (Week 2)				
Steven Anderito		Bottom three	Eliminated (Week 2)				
Eirini Kalamaraki		Bottom three	Eliminated (Week 2)				
Irwan Easty		Bottom three	Eliminated (Week 2)				
Natasa Veneti		Bottom three	Eliminated (Week 2)				
Fani Tselepi		Bottom three	Eliminated (Week 2)				
Eleni Geragidi	Bottom three	Eliminated (Week 1)					
Vasilis Axiotis	Bottom three	Eliminated (Week 1)					
Aris Kambanos	Bottom three	Eliminated (Week 1)					
Violeta Christina Dagkalou	Bottom three	Eliminated (Week 1)					
Aggeliki Zika	Bottom three	Eliminated (Week 1)					
Mary Doutsi	Bottom three	Eliminated (Week 1)					
Dimitris Tiktopoulos	Bottom three	Eliminated (Week 1)					
Evelina Nikoliza	Bottom three	Eliminated (Week 1)					

=== Live show details ===
The live shows took place in the Kapa Studios in Spata, Attica. Each coach has eight acts; during the first live show four from each team performed but only two of them advanced to the third live show. The same process goes on to the second with sixteen acts from both lives making it to the third live show. From the third live and on, each coach loses one act until each coach has one act in the final live.

The eight semi-finalists had a song written by songwriters and producers of Universal Greece. Even though the songs of the eliminated semi-finalists were not presented on the day of the results as it was done for the four finalists, they were included in the CD that was released in the newspaper Proto Thema. Apart from the eight songs of the semi-finalists, three of the duets performed in the semi-final were also included in the CD.

Color key

Artist was saved by the public's vote
Artist was part of the bottom two in his/her team and saved by his/her coach
Artist was saved after receiving the highest accumulated coach's and public's points
Artist was eliminated
Artist received the most public votes

==== Week 1 (March 28) ====
The first live show aired on March 28, 2014 – with four acts from each team performing. Two acts per team were saved, one by the public and one from his/her coach.

- Group performance: The Voice of Greece coaches – "Rixe Kokkino Sti Nihta" / "You're the Voice"

Order	Coach	Artist	Song	Result
1	Antonis Remos	Evelina Nikoliza	"You've Got the Love"	Eliminated
2	Antonis Remos	Alex Economou	"Krifa"	Public's choice
3	Antonis Remos	Dimitris Tiktopoulos	"Paradise City"	Eliminated
4	Antonis Remos	Lefteris Kintatos	"Ennea Ogdoa"	Remos' choice
5	Melina Aslanidou	Ifigenia Atkinson	"Diamonds"	Aslanidou's choice
6	Melina Aslanidou	Emily Charalambous	"Tou Pothou To Agrimi"	Public's choice
7	Melina Aslanidou	Mary Doutsi	"My Way"	Eliminated
8	Melina Aslanidou	Aggeliki Zika	"Faidra"	Eliminated
9	Michalis Kouinelis	Panayiotis Vintzilaios	"Damn Your Eyes"	Kouinelis' choice
10	Michalis Kouinelis	Aris Kambanos	"Spoudaioi Anthropoi Alla"	Eliminated
11	Michalis Kouinelis	Violeta Christina Dagkalou	"Iliagiali"	Eliminated
12	Michalis Kouinelis	Yuri Melikov	"Let the Music Play"	Public's choice
13	Despina Vandi	Katerina Lioliou	"Sweet Child o' Mine"	Public's choice
14	Despina Vandi	Dimitris Fournarakis	"Ma Pou Na Pao"	Vandi's choice
15	Despina Vandi	Vasilis Axiotis	"You Can Leave Your Hat On"	Eliminated
16	Despina Vandi	Eleni Geragidi	"We Found Love"	Eliminated

==== Week 2 (April 4) ====
The live show aired on April 4, 2014 – with four acts from each team performing. Two acts per team were saved, one by the public and one from his/her coach.

Order	Coach	Artist	Song	Result
1	Despina Vandi	Stelios Mayalios	"Smells Like Teen Spirit"	Vandi's choice
2	Despina Vandi	Maria Elena Kiriakou	"I Have Nothing"	Public's choice
3	Despina Vandi	Elpida Papakosma	"Empire State of Mind"	Eliminated
4	Despina Vandi	Nikos Mpaliakos	"Wake Me Up"	Eliminated
5	Michalis Kouinelis	Tasos Panagiotopoulos	"Starlight"	Kouinelis' choice
6	Michalis Kouinelis	Areti Kosmidou	"Big in Japan"	Public's choice
7	Michalis Kouinelis	Steven Anderito	"Save Tonight"	Eliminated
8	Michalis Kouinelis	Dimitra Dimitrakopoulou	"Den Zitao Polla"	Eliminated
9	Melina Aslanidou	Eirini Kalamaraki	"I Epimoni Sou"	Eliminated
10	Melina Aslanidou	Irwan Easty	"Friday I'm in Love"	Eliminated
11	Melina Aslanidou	Anna Maria Bilida	"Kopse kai Moirase"	Public's choice
12	Melina Aslanidou	Vasilis Chatzipartalis	"Tha Ekrago"	Aslanidou's choice
13	Antonis Remos	Natasa Veneti	"An Eixes Erthei Pio Noris"	Eliminated
14	Antonis Remos	Dimos Mpeke	"Still Got the Blues (For You)"	Public's choice
15	Antonis Remos	Georgina Karachaliou	"Uninvited"	Remos' choice
16	Antonis Remos	Fani Tselepi	"Ela Pou Fovamai"	Eliminated

==== Week 3 (April 11) ====
The live show aired on April 11, 2014 – with four acts from each team performing. Three acts per team were saved, two by the public and one from his/her coach.

Order	Coach	Artist	Song	Result
1	Michalis Kouinelis	Panayiotis Vintzilaios	"Dirty Diana"	Kouinelis' choice
2	Michalis Kouinelis	Tasos Panagiotopoulos	"San Skia"	Eliminated
3	Michalis Kouinelis	Areti Kosmidou	"Little Talks"	Public's choice
4	Michalis Kouinelis	Yuri Melikov	"She's a Lady"	Public's choice
5	Antonis Remos	Lefteris Kintatos	"Thes"	Public's choice
6	Antonis Remos	Alex Economou	"Over My Shoulder"	Public's choice
7	Antonis Remos	Dimos Mpeke	"Ena Tragoudi Akoma"	Eliminated
8	Antonis Remos	Georgina Karachaliou	"It's a Man's Man's Man's World"	Remos' choice
9	Despina Vandi	Stelios Mayalios	"Cat People"	Public's choice
10	Despina Vandi	Katerina Lioliou	"U + Ur Hand"	Vandi's choice
11	Despina Vandi	Dimitris Fournarakis	"Mia Fora"	Eliminated
12	Despina Vandi	Maria Elena Kiriakou	"Den Eisai Edo"	Public's choice
13	Melina Aslanidou	Vasilis Chatzipartalis	"Den Eimai Allos"	Aslanidou's choice
14	Melina Aslanidou	Anna Maria Bilida	"Fila Me Akoma"	Public's choice
15	Melina Aslanidou	Ifigenia Atkinson	"Domino"	Eliminated
16	Melina Aslanidou	Emily Charalambous	"To Party"	Public's choice

==== Week 4 (April 20) ====
The live show aired on April 20, 2014 – with three acts from each team performing. Two acts per team were saved, one by the public and one from his/her coach.

- Group performances: Team Stavento ("Matia Mou Omorfa"), Team Vandi ("Hano Esena"), Team Remos ("Ta Savvata"), Team Aslanidou ("To Lathos")

Order	Coach	Artist	Song	Result
1	Melina Aslanidou	Vasilis Chatzipartalis	"Poula Me"	Aslanidou's choice
2	Melina Aslanidou	Anna Maria Bilida	"Moira mou Egines"	Eliminated
3	Melina Aslanidou	Emily Charalambous	"Nihta Stasou"	Public's choice
4	Despina Vandi	Katerina Lioliou	"It's My Life"	Vandi's choice
5	Despina Vandi	Stelios Mayalios	"Enter Sandman"	Eliminated
6	Despina Vandi	Maria Elena Kiriakou	"Hurt"	Public's choice
7	Antonis Remos	Alex Economou	"Seven Nation Army"	Public's choice
8	Antonis Remos	Georgina Karachaliou	"Tzivaeri"	Eliminated
9	Antonis Remos	Lefteris Kintatos	"Den Thelo Tetoious Filous"	Remos' choice
10	Michalis Kouinelis	Areti Kosmidou	"Royals"	Kouinelis' choice
11	Michalis Kouinelis	Panayiotis Vintzilaios	"Careless Whisper"	Eliminated
12	Michalis Kouinelis	Yuri Melikov	"Kiss"	Public's choice

==== Week 5: Semi-final (May 2) ====
The live show aired on May 2, 2014 – with two acts from each team performing. One act per team was sent through the final by a mixed voting of the team's coach and public. Each artist performed two songs: a solo number and a duet with a guest. The four finalists performed a preview of their own songs after the results.

- Musical guests: Indila ("Dernière danse"), Stelios Rokkos ("Zo"), Vassilis Karras ("Prigkipessa"), Giorgia ("Ton Idio to Theo"), Mando ("Poliploka"), Elena Paparizou ("Don't Hold Back on Love"), Melisses ("Ena"), Kostas Makedonas ("Den Sou Aniko"), Manos Pirovolakis ("Den Anteho Na Min S'Eho")

Order	Coach	Artist	Solo song	Duet song	Duet with	Score			Result
Order	Coach	Artist	Solo song	Duet song	Duet with	Public	Coach	Total	Result
1	Antonis Remos	Alex Economou	"Everything She Wants"	"Me Sena Plai Mou"	Stelios Rokkos	31	40	71	Eliminated
2	Antonis Remos	Lefteris Kintatos	"Aporo"	"Den Pao Pouthena"	Vassilis Karras	69	60	129	Safe
3	Despina Vandi	Katerina Lioliou	"My Immortal"	"Den Thelo"	Giorgia	20	40	60	Eliminated
4	Despina Vandi	Maria Elena Kiriakou	"Bleeding Love"	"Listen"	Mando	80	60	140	Safe
5	Michalis Kouinelis	Yuri Melikov	"Valerie"	"Kenouria Agapi"	Elena Paparizou	43	47	90	Eliminated
6	Michalis Kouinelis	Areti Kosmidou	"This Is the Life"	"Poison"	Melisses	57	53	110	Safe
7	Melina Aslanidou	Emily Charalambous	"Titanium"	"Antikrista"	Kostas Makedonas	71	55	126	Safe
8	Melina Aslanidou	Vasilis Chatzipartalis	"Esi Eki"	"Stis Ekklisias tin Porta"	Manos Pirovolakis	29	45	74	Eliminated

==== Week 6: Final (May 9) ====
The final live show aired on May 9, 2014 – with one artist from each team performing. Each artist performed three songs: a solo number, a duet with their coach and the song that was performed by the artist in the blind auditions.

- Group performance: The Voice of Greece Final 12 with Giorgos Liagas - "Love Me Again"

Order	Coach	Artist	First song	Second song (duet)	Third song	Voting	Result
1	Despina Vandi	Maria Elena Kiriakou	"Dio Egoismoi"	"No More Tears (Enough Is Enough)"	"Because of You"	37,5	Winner
2	Antonis Remos	Lefteris Kintatos	"Gia Tin Parti Tis"	"Gia Na Se Ekdikitho"	"Feggari Mou Chlomo"	17,8	Third place
3	Melina Aslanidou	Emily Charalambous	"Ego Eimai Ego"	"Zita Mou Oti Thes" / "To Hirokrotima"	N/A (already eliminated)	8,9	Fourth place
4	Michalis Kouinelis	Areti Kosmidou	"So Cruel"	"Prin Se Gnoriso"	"Let Her Go"	35,8	Runner-up

== Performances by guests/coaches ==
Episode	Show segment	Performer(s)	Song(s)	Performance type	Source
1	The Blind Auditions, Part 1	The Voice of Greece coaches	"Me Mia Agalia Tragoudia" "Den Eho Diefthinsi" "Iparhi Zoi" "Ine Stigmes" "Pidao Ta Kimata"	live performance	
13	The Live Shows, Part 1	The Voice of Greece coaches	"Rixe Kokkino Sti Nihta" / "You're the Voice"	live performance	
15	The Live Shows, Part 3	Melina Aslanidou	"Ah Kindinevo"	live performance	
16	The Live Shows, Part 4	Despina Vandi	"Kalimera"	live performance	
17	The Live Shows, Part 5	Indila feat. Stavento	"Dernière danse"	live performance	
17	The Live Shows, Part 5	Stelios Rokkos	"Zo"	live performance	—N/a
17	The Live Shows, Part 5	Vassilis Karras	"Prigkipessa"	live performance	—N/a
17	The Live Shows, Part 5	Giorgia	"Ton Idio to Theo"	live performance	—N/a
17	The Live Shows, Part 5	Mando	"Poliploka"	live performance	—N/a
17	The Live Shows, Part 5	Elena Paparizou	"Don't Hold Back on Love"	live performance	—N/a
17	The Live Shows, Part 5	Melisses	"Ena"	live performance	—N/a
17	The Live Shows, Part 5	Kostas Makedonas	"Den Sou Aniko"	live performance	—N/a
17	The Live Shows, Part 5	Manos Pirovolakis	"Den Anteho Na Min S'Eho"	live performance	—N/a
17	The Live Shows, Part 5	Stelios Rokkos (with Alex Economou)	"Me Sena Plai Mou"	duet with contestant	
17	The Live Shows, Part 5	Vassilis Karras (with Lefteris Kintatos)	"Den Pao Pouthena"	duet with contestant	
17	The Live Shows, Part 5	Giorgia (with Katerina Lioliou)	"Den Thelo"	duet with contestant	
17	The Live Shows, Part 5	Mando (with Maria Elena Kiriakou)	"Listen"	duet with contestant	
17	The Live Shows, Part 5	Elena Paparizou (with Yuri Melikov)	"Kenouria Agapi"	duet with contestant	
17	The Live Shows, Part 5	Melisses (with Areti Kosmidou)	"Poison"	duet with contestant	
17	The Live Shows, Part 5	Kostas Makedonas (with Emily Charalambous)	"Antikrista"	duet with contestant	
17	The Live Shows, Part 5	Manos Pirovolakis (with Vasilis Chatzipartalis)	"Stis Ekklisias tin Porta"	duet with contestant	
18	The Live Shows, Part 6	Stefanos Korkolis (with Antonis Remos)	"TBA"	live performance	

== Ratings ==
#	Episode	Date	Timeslot (EET)	Official ratings (in millions)	Rank		Share		Source
#	Episode	Date	Timeslot (EET)	Official ratings (in millions)	Daily	Weekly	Household	Adults 15-44	Source
1	"Blind Auditions, Part 1"	January 10, 2014	Friday 9:15pm	1.78	1	3	35.2%	43.8%	
2	"Blind Auditions, Part 2"	January 17, 2014	Friday 9:15pm	1.55	2	7	31.7%	39.4%	
3	"Blind Auditions, Part 3"	January 24, 2014	Friday 9:15pm	1.734	1	4	34.4%	46.2%	
4	"Blind Auditions, Part 4"	January 31, 2014	Friday 9:15pm	1.513	2	8	29.3%	42.2%	
5	"Blind Auditions, Part 5"	February 7, 2014	Friday 9:15pm	1.609	2	7	32%	43.1%	
6	"Blind Auditions, Part 6"	February 14, 2014	Friday 9:15pm	1.532	2	9	31.7%	42.6%	
7	"Blind Auditions, Part 7"	February 21, 2014	Friday 9:15pm	1.528	2	8	31.7%	38.7%	
8	"Blind Auditions, Part 8"	February 23, 2014	Sunday 9:15pm	1.801	1	4	34.8%	42.6%	
9	"The Battles, Part 1"	February 28, 2014	Friday 9:15pm	1.705	1	5	37.5%	45.8%	
10	"The Battles, Part 2"	March 7, 2014	Friday 9:15pm	1.553	1	8	30.8%	38.2%	
11	"The Battles, Part 3"	March 14, 2014	Friday 9:15pm	1.531	2	8	29.7%	38.6%	
12	"The Battles, Part 4"	March 21, 2014	Friday 9:15pm	1.446	2	8	29.5%	39.8%	
13	"Live Shows, Part 1"	March 28, 2014	Friday 9:15pm	1.642	1	2	38%	48.5%	
14	"Live Shows, Part 2"	April 4, 2014	Friday 9:15pm	1.326	2	10	33.1%	41.25%	
15	"Live Shows, Part 3"	April 11, 2014	Friday 9:15pm	1.319	2	8	34.1%	42.38%	
16	"Live Shows, Part 4"	April 20, 2014	Sunday 9:15pm	1.319	1	3	39%	43.4%	
17	"Live Shows, Part 5"	May 2, 2014	Friday 9:15pm	1.593	1	2	40.1%	51.8%	
18	"Live Shows, Part 6"	May 9, 2014	Friday 9:15pm	1.714	1	3	45%	52.9%	
