= Kyriacos Pavlou =

Cypriot footballer (born 1986)

Kyriakos Pavlou
Personal information
- Full name: Kyriakos Pavlou
- Date of birth: 4 September 1986 (age 40)
- Place of birth: Larnaca, Cyprus
- Height: 1.73 m (5 ft 8 in)
- Position: Midfielder

Team information
- Current team: P.O. Xylotymbou
- Number: 77

Youth career
- –2002: Larnaca

Senior career*
Years	Team	Apps	(Gls)
2002–2006	AEK Larnaca	60	(4)
2006–2007	Panionios	1	(0)
2007–2009	AC Omonia	13	(2)
2009	→ AEK Larnaca (loan)	9	(3)
2009	→ Ermis Aradippou (loan)	6	(1)
2010	Diagoras	12	(0)
2010–2011	APOP Kinyras Peyias	24	(6)
2011–2015	AEK Larnaca	91	(16)
2015–2016	Nea Salamina	32	(11)
2017	Aris Limassol	9	(0)
2017–2019	Enosis Neon Paralimni	19	(10)
2019–	P.O. Xylotymbou	10	(5)

International career^{‡}
2008–	Cyprus	11	(0)
- * Club domestic league appearances and goals as of 23:56, 27 March 2019 (UTC) ‡ National team caps and goals as of February 2011

Kyriakos Pavlou (Greek: Κυριάκος Παύλου; born 4 September 1986) is a Cypriot footballer who plays for P.O. Xylotymbou. He is the brother of singer Maria Kyriakou

== Club career ==
Pavlou debuted for AEK Larnaca F.C. in 2002. His nickname is Koullis. In 2006, he transferred to the Greek team Panionios F.C. After failing to make the starting line-up in any competitive matches, he returned to Cyprus and AC Omonia. Since then, he has been on loan to other clubs and last played for Ermis Aradippou and Diagoras F.C. in Second Division of Greece. In 2011, he returned to Cyprus to play for APOP Kinyras Peyias FC but the team relegated. On 23 March 2011 he signed a 3-year contract with AEK Larnaca F.C.

=== P.O. Xylotymbou ===
On 18 January 2019 he signed a 6-month contract with P.O. Xylotymbou.

== International career ==
Pavlou has been capped 9 times with Cyprus national football team without scoring any goal. His first appearance with Cyprus was on 19 May 2008 in a friendly lost 2-0 from Greece in Patra.

== Honours ==
AEK Larnaca

- Cypriot Cup: 2003–04
