= Maria Elena Kyriakou =

Greek Cypriot singer (born 1984)

Maria Elena Kyriakou Μαρία Έλενα Κυριάκου
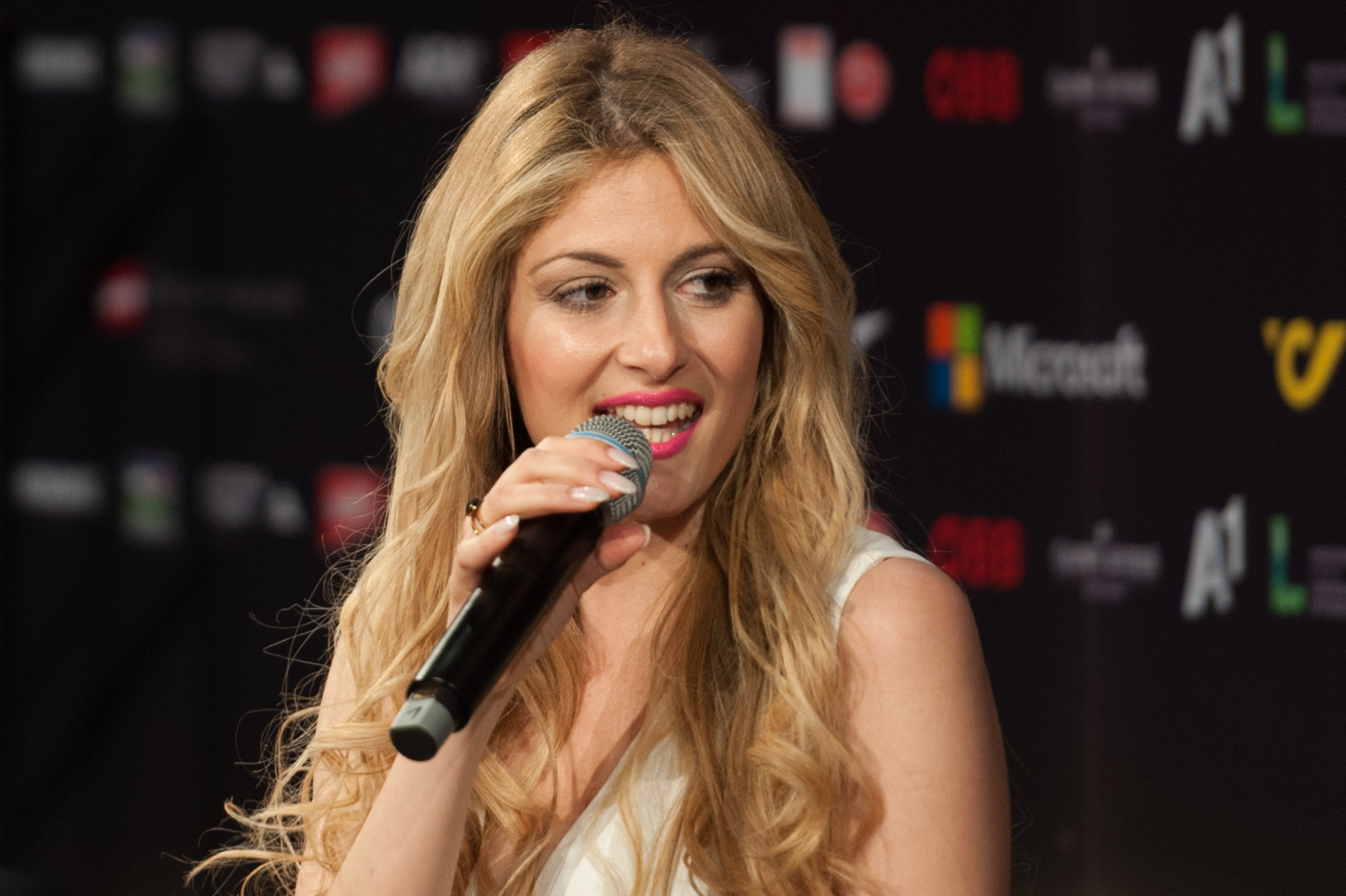
- Kyriakou in 2015

Background information
- Born: 11 January 1984 (age 42); Larnaca, Cyprus
- Genres: Pop
- Occupation: Singer
- Instrument: Vocals
- Years active: 2014–present
- Labels: Minos EMI (2014–present)

Maria Elena Kyriakou (Greek: Μαρία Έλενα Κυριάκου, pronounced [maˈri.a ˈelena cirˈʝaku]; born 11 January 1984) is a Greek-Cypriot singer best known for winning the first season of The Voice of Greece under the mentorship of Despina Vandi. She represented Greece in the Eurovision Song Contest 2015 with her song "One Last Breath".

== Biography and career ==
=== Early life ===
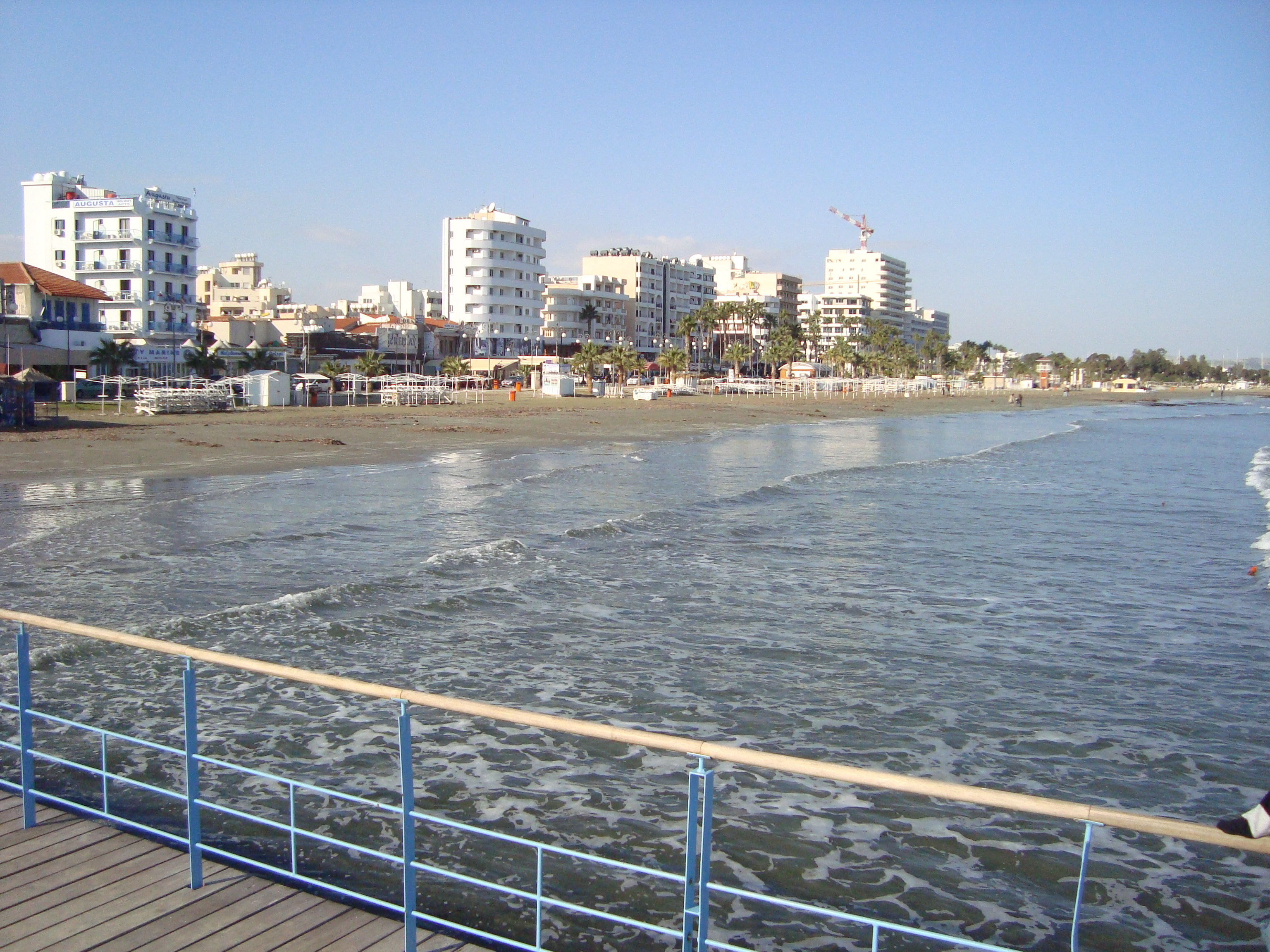
Larnaca, Maria Elena's birthplace

Maria Elena Kyriakou was born on 11 January 1984 in Larnaca, Cyprus and has lived there since then. She has three siblings; one brother Kyriacos Pavlou and two sisters. At the age of 13, her mother registered her at a music school. Years later, she studied philosophy at the University of Ioannina and during the first year she got a proposition from Giannis Ploutarchos which she did not accept as she preferred to concentrate on her studying. After 2 years at the University of Ioannina she decided to move back to her home country. She then continued her studies at the University of Cyprus. After her graduation she opened her own tutorial class. In 2011, her mother applied for Maria Elena to audition for Greek Idol but did not go to the auditions.

=== 2014: The Voice of Greece ===
Kyriakou auditioned for The Voice of Greece at the age of twenty-nine. Appearing on the third of the eight blind auditions, she auditioned with "Because of You" originally by Kelly Clarkson—with all four coaches electing for her to join their teams; from which Kyriakou selected Despina Vandi. During the battles, she performed "Hero" against Eva Kanata–with Despina crowning her as the winner. In the second live show, she performed "I Have Nothing" and was saved by the public. In the third live show, she performed "Den Eisai Edo" and was once again saved by the public along with Stelios Mayalios. In the fourth live show, she performed "Hurt" and was saved by the public to proceed to the semi-final. In the semi-final, she performed "Bleeding Love" for her solo performance and "Listen" for her duet with Mando. Kyriakou proceeded to the final after getting 60 points from her coach and 80 points from the public. Her song "Dio Egoismoi" was available on iTunes the day after the semi-final, on 3 May 2014. In the final she performed her original song "Dio Egoismoi" and a duet with her coach with the song "No More Tears (Enough Is Enough)". As she advanced to the second round along with Kosmidou and Kintatos, she performed "Because of You", the song she performed during the blind auditions. Kyriakou won the series and a record deal with Minos EMI.

The Voice of Greece season 1 performances and results
Show	Theme	Song choice	Original artist	Order	Result
Blind Auditions	Contestant's choice	"Because of You"	Kelly Clarkson	9	Advanced
Battles	Coach's choice	"Hero" (against Eva Kanata)	Mariah Carey	1	Advanced
Live show 2	Coach's choice	"I Have Nothing"	Whitney Houston	2	Safe
Live show 3	Coach's choice	"Den Eisai Edo"	Dimitra Galani	12	Safe
Live show 4	Coach's choice	"Hurt"	Christina Aguilera	6	Safe
Live show 4	Group performance	"Hano Esena" (with Team Vandi)	Despina Vandi	—N/a	Safe
Semi-final	Coach's choice	"Bleeding Love"	Leona Lewis	7	Safe
Semi-final	Duet with guest	"Listen" (duet with Mando)	Beyoncé	8	Safe
Final	Original song	"Dio Egoismoi"	Maria Elena Kyriakou	1	Winner
Final	Duet with coach	"No More Tears" (with Despina Vandi)	Barbra Streisand & Donna Summer	2	Winner
Final	Auditions' song	"Because of You"	Kelly Clarkson	9	Winner

=== 2015: Eurovision Song Contest ===
Maria Elena Kyriakou won the Greek national final and represented Greece in the Eurovision Song Contest 2015 in Vienna, Austria.

== Personal life ==
Kyriakou is one of the four children in her family among them the known Cypriot footballer Kyriacos Pavlou. In 2006, she married Cypriot sports journalist Gregoris Gregoriou, with whom she has three children; Kyriakou and Gregoriou divorced in 2011.

== Discography ==
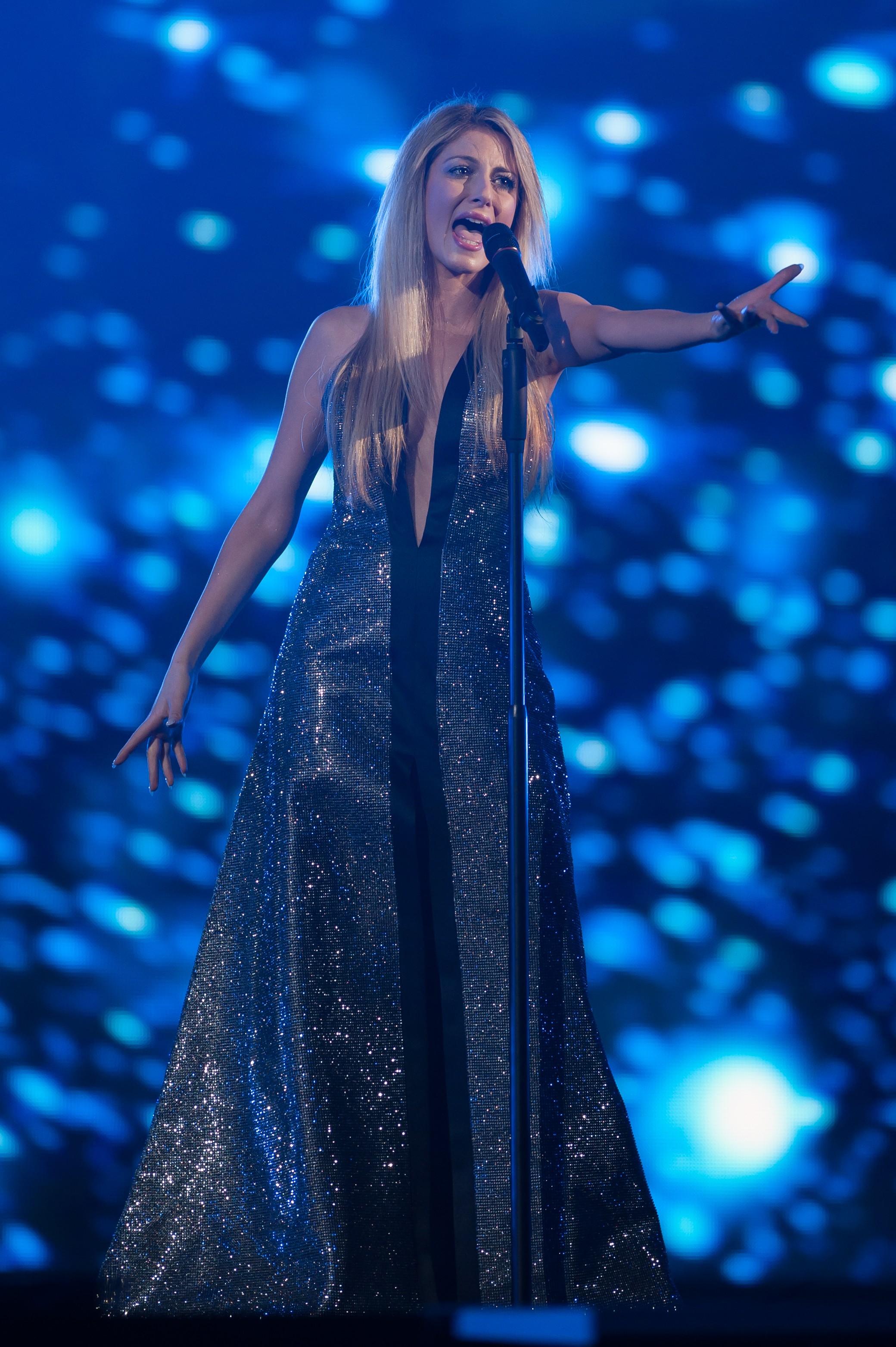
Maria Elena Kyriakou performing "One Last Breath" at Wiener Stadthalle, Vienna in the 2015 Contest.

=== Studio albums ===
Title	Album details	Peak chart positions
Title	Album details	GRE
Dio ageloi sti gi (in Greek Δυο Άγγελοι Στη Γη)	Released: TBA; Label: Minos EMI; Formats: CD, CD/DVD, Digital Download	—

=== Singles ===
Title	Year	Peak chart positions		Album
Title	Year	GRE	ICE	Album
"Dio egoismoi"	2014	—	—	Dio ageloi sti gi
"Dio ageloi sti gi"	2014	—	—	Dio ageloi sti gi
"One Last Breath"	2015	—	35	Non-album single
"Mia anapnoi" (Greek version of "One Last Breath")	2015	—	—	Non-album single

Autumn 2015 Horis Esena (Without You) for the show with which it shares the same name.

Featured in

- 2015: "The Otherside" (Tamar Kaprelian featuring Elhaida Dani, Elina Born, Maria-Elena Kyriakou & Stephanie Topalian)

== Television ==
Television
Year	Title	Role	Note
2014	The Voice of Greece	Herself	Contestant; Winner
2015	Eurosong 2015 - a MAD show	Herself	Contestant; Winner
2015	Eurovision Song Contest 2015	Herself	Contestant; 19th place

== Awards ==
Year	Contest	Award	Result
2015	MAD Video Music Awards	Best New Artist	Won

Awards and achievements
Preceded by N/A	Winner of The Voice of Greece; 2014	Succeeded by Kostas Ageris
Preceded by Freaky Fortune feat. RiskyKidd with "Rise Up"	Greece in the Eurovision Song Contest; 2015	Succeeded by Argo with "Utopian Land"
