= Svetlana Morgunova =

Russian television host (1940–2024)

Svetlana Morgunova PAR
- Светлана Моргунова
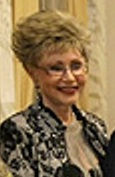
- Morgunova in 2009
- Born: Svetlana Mikhailovna Morgunova; 7 March 1940; Moscow, Russian SFSR, USSR
- Died: 10 March 2024 (aged 84); Moscow, Russia
- Occupations: Announcer; Presenter
- Years active: 1961–2024
- Awards: Order of Friendship (2011)

Svetlana Mikhailovna Morgunova (Russian: Светла́на Миха́йловна Моргуно́ва; 7 March 1940 – 10 March 2024) was a Russian announcer for Soviet Central Television from 1961 onwards, and a television and radio host.

== Biography ==
Svetlana Morgunova was born on 7 March 1940. She worked in different genres: she conducted the informational TV program Vremya, acquainted the audience with the program of television programs, and also conducted many editions of the musical entertainment program Little Blue Light.

Morgunova died on 10 March 2024, aged 84.

== Awards and honours ==
- Honored Artist of the RSFSR (1978)
- People's Artist of Russia (2000)
- Order of Friendship (2011) for great achievements in the development of domestic broadcasting and many years of fruitful activity
