= Yuri Melikov =

Cypriot singer and songwriter (born 1997)

Gioúri Melikov Γιούρι Μελίκοβ Юрий Меликов
- Born: Gioúri Melikov; 28 November 1997 (age 28); Paralimni, Cyprus
- Origin: Paralimni, Cyprus
- Genres: Pop-folk, pop, dance
- Occupations: Singer, songwriter
- Instrument: Vocals
- Years active: 2014–present
- Label: Satellite Records

Gioúri Melikov (Greek: Γιούρι Μελίκοβ, Russian: Юрий Меликов; born 28 November 1997) is a Cypriot singer and songwriter. He launched his musical career in 2014 as a contestant of The Voice of Greece, season 1. In 2015, Melikov entered the Eurovision Song Project (the Cypriot national selections for Eurovision Song Contest 2015) with his song "Victorious".

== Early life ==
Yuri Melikov was born in 1997 in Paralimni, the son of an Armenian father and a Russian-Cypriot mother. He was raised in Paralimni and his mother enrolled him in a conservatory, where he took classical and modern music lessons for six years. This was after his mother suggested to him that he takes music lessons because he listens to music all day yet she doesn't hear him sing. His father taught him to play the violin along with his cousins and served as his manager as well.

== Career ==
=== 2014: The Voice of Greece and first singles ===
Melikov started off his music career when he auditioned for the first season of The Voice of Greece at the age of sixteen. " He appeared on the third of the eight blind auditions and auditioned with "Delilah" by Tom Jones. He was made part of Michalis Kouinelis' team in the contest. During the battles, he performed "It's Now or Never" alongside Panos Patagiannis with Michalis crowning him as the winner. He went on to perform in the first live show with the song "Let the Music Play" which resulted to him being saved from elimination via public votes. In the third live show, he performed "She's a Lady" and was once again saved by the public along with Areti Kosmidou. In the fourth live show, he performed "Kiss" and was, for third time, saved by the public. In the semi-final, he performed "Valerie" and for his duet, he performed "Kenouria Agapi" along with Helena Paparizou. Melikov failed to proceed to the final after getting 47 points from his coach and 43 points from the public.

On 3 December 2014, Melikov released his first singles - "Merry Christmas" and its Greek version, "Hristougenniatikes Agapes" through iTunes

=== 2015: Eurovision Song Contest 2015 and second single ===
In 2015, Melikov attempted to represent Cyprus at the Eurovision Song Contest 2015 through the Eurovision Song Project, the national selections of Cyprus. He auditioned to the contest with the song "Hold Me Now" by Johnny Logan as well as his original song "Victorious" and secured a "Yes" from all the four judges resulting to his qualification into the contest. On 16 January 2015, he performed "Victorious" for the Eurochallenge 1 of the contest and ended in the 11-20 placing, resulting to his elimination from the contest.

On 23 February 2015, Melikov released his second single "You Got Me (Aha Aha)". He also released the accompanying music video of the song on the same day.

He has mentioned that he plans to continue his singing career outside of Greece because his style of music does not allow him to do much in the country, and that he would be willing to take his singing career to the United States or United Kingdom.

== Personal life ==
On 23 April 2014, Melikov said that he is in a relationship with a girl named Valentina, and that he dedicated a song to her during the semi-finals of The Voice of Greece.

== See also ==
- Cyprus in the Eurovision Song Contest 2015
- The Voice of Greece (season 1)
