= Valentin Yudashkin =

Russian fashion designer (1963–2023)

- Валентин Юдашкин
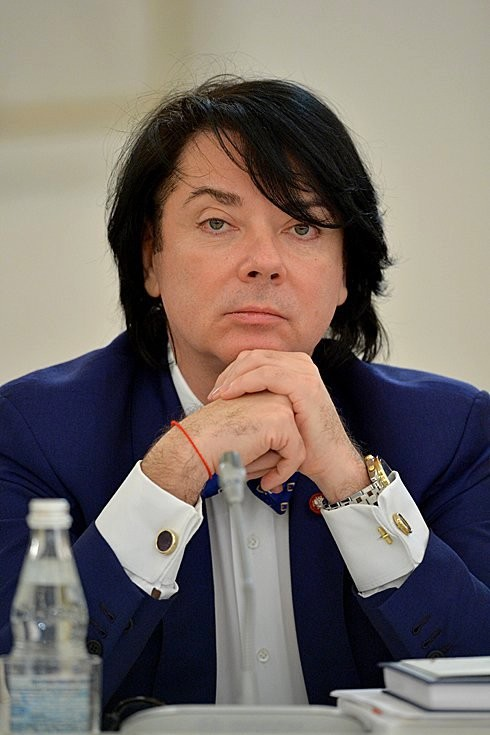
- Born: Valentin Abramovich Yudashkin; 14 October 1963; Bakovka, Moscow Oblast, Russian SFSR, Soviet Union
- Died: 2 May 2023 (aged 59); Moscow, Russia
- Occupation: fashion designer
- Website: yudashkin.com

Valentin Abramovich Yudashkin (Russian: Валентин Абрамович Юдашкин Russian pronunciation: [vəlʲɪnʲˈtʲin ɐˈbraməvʲɪtɕ jʊˈdaʂkʲɪn]; 14 October 1963 – 2 May 2023) was a Russian fashion designer.

== Career ==
Born in Moscow Oblast, Yudashkin came to prominence during the 1980s, dressing Raisa Gorbacheva. He is considered the first post-Soviet designer to have brought a contemporary Russian look to the international fashion world all the while having wowed critics with sumptuous theatricality as well as wearable styles.

His designs have been exhibited in museums such as the Musée de la mode et du textile in Paris, the California Museum of Fashion in Los Angeles, the Metropolitan Museum in New York, and the State Historical Museum in Moscow. In 2010, he redesigned Russia's military uniforms, creating 85 designs to dress all branches of the Russian armed services.

In 2022, he was banned from Paris Fashion Week for his silence on Russia's invasion of Ukraine.

Yudashkin died from kidney cancer on 2 May 2023, at the age of 59.
