= Sing for Greece =

Greek selection for the Eurovision Song Contest

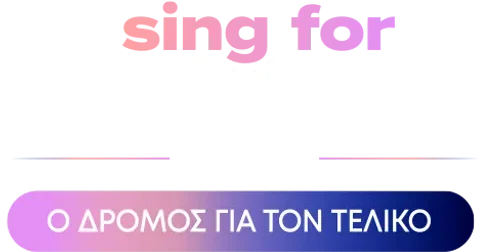
- Logo since 2026
- Also known as: Ethnikós Telikós
- Genre: Music, entertainment, reality television
- Based on: Eurovision Song Contest
- Directed by: Fokas Evangelinos (2025 – present)
- Presented by: Giorgos Kapoutzidis, Betty Maggira, Katerina Vrana (2026); Helena Paparizou, Sakis Rouvas (2025)
- Country of origin: Greece
- Original language: Greek
- No. of seasons: 2

Production
- Executive producer: Haris Fyseros
- Running time: ~180 minutes
- Production company: ERT

Original release
- Network: ERTFLIX (streaming platform, 2025 – present); ERT1 (domestic television channel, 2025 – present); ERT Cosmos (international television channel, 2025 – present); Second Programme (domestic radio channel, 2025 – present); Voice of Greece (international radio channel, 2025 – present); ERTecho (2025 – present)
- Network: YouTube (2025 – present); RIK 1 (2026 – present)
- Release: 30 January 2025 – present

Related
- Greece in the Eurovision Song Contest

Sing for Greece (abbreviated SFG; Greek: Εθνικός Τελικός) is an annual music contest organised by the Greek public broadcaster ERT, serving the Greek selection format for the Eurovision Song Contest since 2025, replacing the previous Greek Eurovision selection Ellinikós Telikós which had been held since 1979.

== Winners ==
Table key
First place
Second place
Third place
Last place

Year	Song	Artist	Results at Eurovision			
Year	Song	Artist	Final	Points	Semi	Points
2025	"Asteromata"	Klavdia	6	231	4	112
2026	"Ferto"	Akylas	10	220	7	159

== Editions ==
=== 2025 ===
Under the name Ethnikós Telikós (Greek: Εθνικός Τελικός; English: National Selection) the final took place on 30 January 2025 at the Christmas Theater in Galatsi, Athens. Twelve songs competed and the winner, "Asteromata" performed by Klavdia, was selected by a combination of public voting conducted through SMS (50%), Greek jury voting (25%) and international jury voting (25%).

Final – 30 January 2025
R/O	Artist	Song	Jury		Televote	Total	Place
R/O	Artist	Song	Greek	Intl.	Televote	Total	Place
1	Rikki	"Elevator (Up and Down)"	8	4	2	14	7
2	Thanos Lambrou	"Free Love"	1	7	4	12	9
3	Kostas Ageris	"Gi mou"	7	1	10	18	6
4	Andy Nicolas	"Lost My Way"	3	5	0	8	10
5	Klavdia	"Asteromata"	12	8	24	44	1
6	Constantinos Christoforou and Kostas Karafotis	"Paradeisos"	5	0	8	13	8
7	Georgina Kalais and John Vlaseros	"High Road"	0	2	6	8	10
8	Barbz	"Sirens"	6	10	14	30	3
9	Evangelia	"Vale"	10	12	20	42	2
10	Dinamiss	"Odyssey"	4	4	16	24	4
11	Nafsica Gavrilaki	"Unhurt Me"	0	0	0	0	12
12	Xannova Xan	"Play It!"	2	6	12	20	5

=== 2026 ===
The contest was rebranded as "Sing for Greece". The competition consisted of three shows that took place between 11 and 15 February 2026 at the Peiraios 260 in Athens, hosted by Giorgos Kapoutzidis, Betty Maggira and Katerina Vrana, with Fokas Evangelinos serving as the artistic director. All shows were broadcast on ERT1, ERT World, Second Programme (with commentary by Mikaela Theofilou and Dimitris Meidanis), Voice of Greece and ERT echo, as well as online on ERT's over-the-top media service ERTFLIX. The final was also broadcast on RIK 1 in Cyprus and on the Eurovision Song Contest's official YouTube channel.

==== Format ====
The competition consisted of three shows: two semi-finals on 11 and 13 February 2026 and a final on 15 February 2026. 14 songs competed in each semi-final and the top seven entries qualified to the final. The results for the semi-finals were determined exclusively by public voting, while the results in the final were determined by a combination of public and jury voting. Public voting was conducted through SMS and online voting.

==== Competing entries ====
On 17 September 2025, ERT opened a submission period where artists and composers were able to submit their entries for consideration by the broadcaster by 2 November 2025. Artists were required to be Greek citizens, be permanent residents in Greece or be of Greek descent. Songwriters could be of any nationality and submit up to three songs, however each song was required to have at least one songwriter that was a Greek citizen or a permanent resident in Greece. 264 songs were received by the submission deadline and a seven-member jury selected 28 entries to participate in the national final. The jury consisted of Giorgos Theofanous (composer and producer), Pavlina Voulgaraki (songwriter), Despina Kritikou (radio station director), Monsieur Minimal (songwriter), Giorgos Mouchtaridis (radio producer), Dimitris Rigopoulos (journalist) and Marietta Fafouti (songwriter). The competing entries were revealed on 4 January 2026 during the show Sing for Greece – Ethnikós Telikós Eurovision 2026 – I finalist, broadcast on ERT1 and hosted by Betty Maggira, Kelly Vranaki and Thanos Papahamos. Among the selected competing artists was Koza Mostra, who previously represented Greece in 2013.

Artist	Song	Songwriter(s)
Akylas	"Ferto" (Φέρτο)	Akylas Mytilinaios; Orfeas Nonis; Theofilos Pouzbouris; Thomas Papathanasis
Alexandra Sieti	"The Other Side"	Alexandra Sieti; Hill Kourkoutis; Serena Ryder
Basilica	"Set Everything on Fire"	Vasiliki Maria Polytaridi
D3lta	"Mad About It"	Anthony Mack; Roberto Koustas
Desi G	"Aphrodite"	Christian Ostmoe; Despina Gkioulis; Kate Mattson; Shai Pinto
Dinamiss	"Chaos"	Eleni Dina; Maria Dina
Evangelia	"Parea" (Παρέα)	Alessandra Francesca Bregante; Evangelia Psarakis; Gino "the Ghost" Borri; Giorgos Kalogerakos; Jay Stolar; Jordan Palmer; Kyle Buckley; Samantha Cámara; Vlospa
Garvin	"Back in the Game"	Georgios Arvanitakis
Good Job Nicky	"Dark Side of the Moon"	Connor Mullally; Nikolas Varthakouris; Trey Qua
Kianna	"No More Drama"	Elke Tiel; Konstantina Zerva
Koza Mostra	"Bulletproof"	Ilias Kozas
Leroybroughtflowers	"Sabotage!"	Dimitris Daras
Marika	"Daughters of the Sun (A, E, I, O, U)"	Dionysia Klarnetatzi; Marika Papazoglou
Marseaux	"Hanomai" (Χάνομαι)	Manolis Solidakis
Mikay	"Labyrinth"	Foti Katsanos; Miriam Kavoutzi
Niya	"Slipping Away"	Niya Omiridis
Panagiotis Tsakalakos	"2nd Chance"	Christos Ioannidis; Panagiotis Tsakalakos
Revery	"The Songwriter"	Konstantinos Blioumis
Rikki	"Agapi" (Αγάπη)	Giorgos Poulios; Konstantinos Katikaridis
Rosanna Mailan	"Alma" (Άλμα)	Chris Zantioti; Nany Zarikian; Rosanna Mailan
Spheyiaa	"Hilia kommatia" (Χίλια κομμάτια)	Aristotelis Pasialakos; Dimitris Varvaresos; Fanis Athanasiou; Georgia Sfetsiou; Nikos Hatzis; Polydoros Babouras
Stefi	"Europa"	Giorgos Dountoulakis; Sergios Tzanidis; Stefania Gatsakou
Stella Kay	"You Are the Fire"	Dimitri Stassos; Irini Michas; Tasos Lyberis
Stylianos	"You & I"	Adam Wu; Stylianos Thomadakis
The Astrolabe	"Drop It"	Athanasios Yamas
Tianora	"Anatello" (Ανατέλλω)	Christina Anna Bounia; Georgina Antonakaki; Pantelis Loupasakis; Violetta Tzivra
Victoria Anastasia	"Whatcha Doin to Me"	Giannis Fousteris; Victoria Anastasia
Zaf	"Asteio" (Αστείο)	Giannis Zafeiriou

==== Semi-finals ====
The two semi-finals took place on 11 and 13 February 2026. 14 songs competed in each semi-final, with the top seven proceeding to the final based on a public vote. In addition to the performances of the competing entries, guest performers included Klavdia (who represented Greece in 2025) in the first semi-final, and Tamta (who represented Cyprus in 2019) and Antigoni (who would represent Cyprus in 2026) in the second semi-final.

Semi-final 1 – 11 February 2026
R/O	Artist	Song	Public vote			Place
R/O	Artist	Song	Online	SMS	Total	Place
1	Alexandra Sieti	"The Other Side"	1,239	1,968	3,207	5
2	The Astrolabe	"Drop It"	525	712	1,237	9
3	Desi G	"Aphrodite"	795	427	1,222	10
4	Akylas	"Ferto"	5,550	8,164	13,714	1
5	Evangelia	"Parea"	1,420	1,819	3,239	4
6	Panagiotis Tsakalakos	"2nd Chance"	222	494	716	14
7	Niya	"Slipping Away"	561	192	753	13
8	Marseaux	"Hanomai"	1,479	2,760	4,239	2
9	Rosanna Mailan	"Alma"	788	1,355	2,143	6
10	Stefi	"Europa"	585	1,302	1,887	7
11	Revery	"The Songwriter"	423	388	811	12
12	Dinamiss	"Chaos"	375	723	1,098	11
13	Stylianos	"You & I"	1,581	2,122	3,703	3
14	Spheyiaa	"Hilia kommatia"	410	926	1,336	8

Semi-final 2 – 13 February 2026
R/O	Artist	Song	Public vote			Place
R/O	Artist	Song	Online	SMS	Total	Place
1	Rikki	"Agapi"	328	433	761	12
2	Garvin	"Back in the Game"	345	367	712	13
3	Mikay	"Labyrinth"	760	1,129	1,889	7
4	Marika	"Daughters of the Sun (A, E, I, O, U)"	883	1,683	2,566	4
5	D3lta	"Mad About It"	1,376	4,085	5,461	2
6	Zaf	"Asteio"	1,068	2,028	3,096	3
7	Kianna	"No More Drama"	368	858	1,226	9
8	Stella Kay	"You Are the Fire"	420	366	786	11
9	Tianora	"Anatello"	686	1,010	1,696	8
10	Victoria Anastasia	"Whatcha Doin to Me"	564	325	889	10
11	Basilica	"Set Everything on Fire"	148	257	405	14
12	Good Job Nicky	"Dark Side of the Moon"	2,569	5,101	7,670	1
13	Koza Mostra	"Bulletproof"	866	1,605	2,471	5
14	Leroybroughtflowers	"Sabotage!"	916	1,301	2,217	6

==== Final ====
The final took place on 15 February 2026. Fourteen songs, seven from each semi final, competed and the winner, "Ferto" performed by Akylas, was selected by a combination of public voting (50%), Greek jury voting (25%) and international jury voting (25%). The Greek jury consisted of Marina Spanou (songwriter), Giannis Vassilopoulos (radio station director), Maria Iliaki (journalist and presenter), Michalis Marinos (actor) and Hara Kefala (vocal coach and music theatre performer), while the international jury consisted of Benedikt Wiehle (journalist at SWR3), Lasha Kapanadze (head of press for Georgia at Eurovision), Jelena Tomašević (Serbian singer), Ludovic Julien Hurel (head of press for France at Eurovision) and Andrei Zapșa (assistant general director and head of program of TRM). In addition to the performances of the competing entries, the guest performer was Christos Mastoras.

Final – 15 February 2026
R/O	Artist	Song	Jury		Public vote				Total	Place
R/O	Artist	Song	Intl.	Greek	Online	SMS	Total	Points	Total	Place
1	Stylianos	"You & I"	4	8	2,419	2,995	5,414	6	18	7
2	D3lta	"Mad About It"	0	5	3,935	13,624	17,559	16	21	6
3	Mikay	"Labyrinth"	3	1	1,084	1,473	2,557	0	4	10
4	Marika	"Daughters of the Sun (A, E, I, O, U)"	0	0	983	1,759	2,742	0	0	13
5	Marseaux	"Hanomai"	8	10	4,279	7,363	11,642	14	32	3
6	Good Job Nicky	"Dark Side of the Moon"	6	7	7,029	19,926	26,955	20	33	2
7	Koza Mostra	"Bulletproof"	2	3	1,593	2,585	4,178	4	9	9
8	Stefi	"Europa"	1	0	1,080	1,997	3,077	0	1	12
9	Rosanna Mailan	"Alma"	0	0	1,481	1,957	3,438	2	2	11
10	Evangelia	"Parea"	10	2	5,196	5,031	10,227	12	24	4
11	Zaf	"Asteio"	7	6	2,640	4,424	7,064	10	23	5
12	Akylas	"Ferto"	12	12	24,706	35,128	59,834	24	48	1
13	Leroybroughtflowers	"Sabotage!"	0	0	593	1,090	1,683	0	0	13
14	Alexandra Sieti	"The Other Side"	5	4	2,252	3,650	5,902	8	17	8
