= Greece in the Eurovision Song Contest 2026 =

- Eurovision Song Contest 2026
- Participating broadcaster: Hellenic Broadcasting Corporation (ERT)
- Country: Greece
- Selection process: Sing for Greece 2026
- Selection date: 15 February 2026

Competing entry
- Song: "Ferto"
- Artist: Akylas
- Songwriters: Akylas Mytilinaios; Orfeas Nonis; Theofilos Pouzbouris; Thomas Papathanasis

Placement
- Semi-final result: Qualified (7th, 159 points)
- Final result: 10th, 220 points

Participation chronology

Greece was represented at the Eurovision Song Contest 2026 with the song "Ferto", written by Akylas Mytilinaios, Orfeas Nonis, Theofilos Pouzbouris and Thomas Papathanasis, and performed by Akylas himself. The Greek participating broadcaster, the Hellenic Broadcasting Corporation (ERT), organised the national final Sing for Greece 2026 in order to select its entry for the contest.

== Background ==
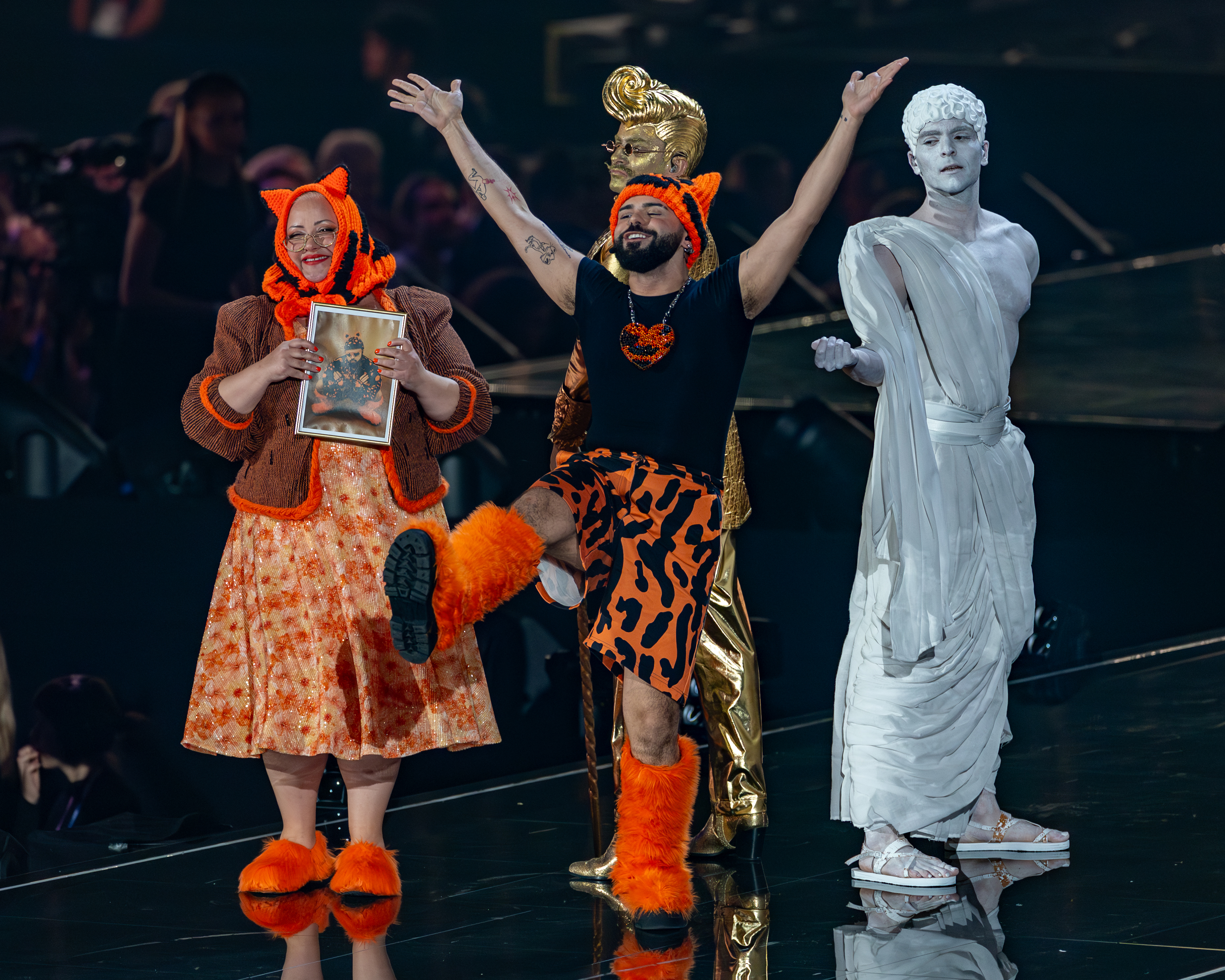
Akylas in Vienna for Eurovision 2026.

Prior to the 2026 contest, Greece had participated in the Eurovision Song Contest 45 times since its debut in 1974. The nation has won the contest once to this point, in 2005 with the song "My Number One" performed by Helena Paparizou. Following the introduction of semi-finals for the 2004 contest, it managed to qualify for the final with each of its entries for several years. Between 2004 and 2013, it achieved nine top ten placements in the final. The first entry to not qualify to the final was "Utopian Land" performed by Argo in 2016. Its 16th-place finish in the semi-final marked its worst placing at the contest and led to its absence from the final for the first time since 2000, when it did not send an entry. In the 2018 contest, it failed to qualify for the second time with "Oniro mou" by Yianna Terzi, finishing 14th in the semi-final, and for the third time in 2023 with "What They Say" by Victor Vernicos. In 2025, "Asteromata" by Klavdia qualified for the final and placed sixth with 231 points.

As part of its duties as participating broadcaster, the Hellenic Broadcasting Corporation (ERT) organises the selection of its entry in the Eurovision Song Contest and broadcasts the event in the country. ERT's predecessor, the National Radio Television Foundation (EIRT), debuted in the contest in 1974 and then ERT participated from 1975 until 2013, when the broadcaster was shut down by a government directive. It was replaced firstly with the interim Dimosia Tileorasi (DT) and then later by the New Hellenic Radio, Internet and Television (NERIT) broadcaster, before reverting to the ERT name by the new government in June 2015. The Greek broadcasters over the years had selected their entries both internally and through the national final format Ellinikós Telikós. ERT confirmed its intention to participate in the 2026 contest on 16 July 2025, and announced on 30 September that a national final would be organised to select its representative.

== Before Eurovision ==
=== Sing for Greece 2026 ===
Sing for Greece 2026 was the national final developed by ERT to select its entry for the Eurovision Song Contest 2026. The competition consisted of three shows that took place between 11 and 15 February 2026 at the Peiraios 260 in Athens, hosted by Giorgos Kapoutzidis, Betty Maggira and Katerina Vrana, with Fokas Evangelinos serving as the artistic director. All shows were broadcast on ERT1, ERT World, Second Programme (with commentary by Mikaela Theofilou and Dimitris Meidanis), Voice of Greece and ERT echo, as well as online on ERT's over-the-top media service ERTFLIX. The final was also broadcast on RIK 1 in Cyprus and on the Eurovision Song Contest's official YouTube channel.

==== Format ====
The competition consisted of three shows: two semi-finals on 11 and 13 February 2026 and a final on 15 February 2026. 14 songs competed in each semi-final and the top seven entries qualified to the final. The results for the semi-finals were determined exclusively by public voting, while the results in the final were determined by a combination of public and jury voting. Public voting was conducted through SMS and online voting.

==== Competing entries ====
On 17 September 2025, ERT opened a submission period where artists and composers were able to submit their entries for consideration by the broadcaster by 2 November 2025. Artists were required to be Greek citizens, be permanent residents in Greece or be of Greek descent. Songwriters could be of any nationality and submit up to three songs, however each song was required to have at least one songwriter that was a Greek citizen or a permanent resident in Greece. 264 songs were received by the submission deadline and a seven-member jury selected 28 entries to participate in the national final. The jury consisted of Giorgos Theofanous (composer and producer), Pavlina Voulgaraki (songwriter), Despina Kritikou (radio station director), Monsieur Minimal (songwriter), Giorgos Mouchtaridis (radio producer), Dimitris Rigopoulos (journalist) and Marietta Fafouti (songwriter). The competing entries were revealed on 4 January 2026 during the show Sing for Greece – Ethnikós Telikós Eurovision 2026 – I finalist, broadcast on ERT1 and hosted by Betty Maggira, Kelly Vranaki and Thanos Papahamos. Among the selected competing artists was Koza Mostra, who previously represented Greece in 2013.

Artist	Song	Songwriter(s)
Akylas	"Ferto" (Φέρτο)	Akylas Mytilinaios; Orfeas Nonis; Theofilos Pouzbouris; Thomas Papathanasis
Alexandra Sieti	"The Other Side"	Alexandra Sieti; Hill Kourkoutis; Serena Ryder
Basilica	"Set Everything on Fire"	Vasiliki Maria Polytaridi
D3lta	"Mad About It"	Anthony Mack; Roberto Koustas
Desi G	"Aphrodite"	Christian Ostmoe; Despina Gkioulis; Kate Mattson; Shai Pinto
Dinamiss	"Chaos"	Eleni Dina; Maria Dina
Evangelia	"Parea" (Παρέα)	Alessandra Francesca Bregante; Evangelia Psarakis; Gino "the Ghost" Borri; Giorgos Kalogerakos; Jay Stolar; Jordan Palmer; Kyle Buckley; Samantha Cámara; Vlospa
Garvin	"Back in the Game"	Georgios Arvanitakis
Good Job Nicky	"Dark Side of the Moon"	Connor Mullally; Nikolas Varthakouris; Trey Qua
Kianna	"No More Drama"	Elke Tiel; Konstantina Zerva
Koza Mostra	"Bulletproof"	Ilias Kozas
Leroybroughtflowers	"Sabotage!"	Dimitris Daras
Marika	"Daughters of the Sun (A, E, I, O, U)"	Dionysia Klarnetatzi; Marika Papazoglou
Marseaux	"Hanomai" (Χάνομαι)	Manolis Solidakis
Mikay	"Labyrinth"	Foti Katsanos; Miriam Kavoutzi
Niya	"Slipping Away"	Niya Omiridis
Panagiotis Tsakalakos	"2nd Chance"	Christos Ioannidis; Panagiotis Tsakalakos
Revery	"The Songwriter"	Konstantinos Blioumis
Rikki	"Agapi" (Αγάπη)	Giorgos Poulios; Konstantinos Katikaridis
Rosanna Mailan	"Alma" (Άλμα)	Chris Zantioti; Nany Zarikian; Rosanna Mailan
Spheyiaa	"Hilia kommatia" (Χίλια κομμάτια)	Aristotelis Pasialakos; Dimitris Varvaresos; Fanis Athanasiou; Georgia Sfetsiou; Nikos Hatzis; Polydoros Babouras
Stefi	"Europa"	Giorgos Dountoulakis; Sergios Tzanidis; Stefania Gatsakou
Stella Kay	"You Are the Fire"	Dimitri Stassos; Irini Michas; Tasos Lyberis
Stylianos	"You & I"	Adam Wu; Stylianos Thomadakis
The Astrolabe	"Drop It"	Athanasios Yamas
Tianora	"Anatello" (Ανατέλλω)	Christina Anna Bounia; Georgina Antonakaki; Pantelis Loupasakis; Violetta Tzivra
Victoria Anastasia	"Whatcha Doin to Me"	Giannis Fousteris; Victoria Anastasia
Zaf	"Asteio" (Αστείο)	Giannis Zafeiriou

==== Semi-finals ====
The two semi-finals took place on 11 and 13 February 2026. 14 songs competed in each semi-final, with the top seven proceeding to the final based on a public vote. In addition to the performances of the competing entries, guest performers included Klavdia (who represented Greece in 2025) in the first semi-final, and Tamta (who represented Cyprus in 2019) and Antigoni (who would represent Cyprus in 2026) in the second semi-final.

Semi-final 1 – 11 February 2026
R/O	Artist	Song	Public vote			Place
R/O	Artist	Song	Online	SMS	Total	Place
1	Alexandra Sieti	"The Other Side"	1,239	1,968	3,207	5
2	The Astrolabe	"Drop It"	525	712	1,237	9
3	Desi G	"Aphrodite"	795	427	1,222	10
4	Akylas	"Ferto"	5,550	8,164	13,714	1
5	Evangelia	"Parea"	1,420	1,819	3,239	4
6	Panagiotis Tsakalakos	"2nd Chance"	222	494	716	14
7	Niya	"Slipping Away"	561	192	753	13
8	Marseaux	"Hanomai"	1,479	2,760	4,239	2
9	Rosanna Mailan	"Alma"	788	1,355	2,143	6
10	Stefi	"Europa"	585	1,302	1,887	7
11	Revery	"The Songwriter"	423	388	811	12
12	Dinamiss	"Chaos"	375	723	1,098	11
13	Stylianos	"You & I"	1,581	2,122	3,703	3
14	Spheyiaa	"Hilia kommatia"	410	926	1,336	8

Semi-final 2 – 13 February 2026
R/O	Artist	Song	Public vote			Place
R/O	Artist	Song	Online	SMS	Total	Place
1	Rikki	"Agapi"	328	433	761	12
2	Garvin	"Back in the Game"	345	367	712	13
3	Mikay	"Labyrinth"	760	1,129	1,889	7
4	Marika	"Daughters of the Sun (A, E, I, O, U)"	883	1,683	2,566	4
5	D3lta	"Mad About It"	1,376	4,085	5,461	2
6	Zaf	"Asteio"	1,068	2,028	3,096	3
7	Kianna	"No More Drama"	368	858	1,226	9
8	Stella Kay	"You Are the Fire"	420	366	786	11
9	Tianora	"Anatello"	686	1,010	1,696	8
10	Victoria Anastasia	"Whatcha Doin to Me"	564	325	889	10
11	Basilica	"Set Everything on Fire"	148	257	405	14
12	Good Job Nicky	"Dark Side of the Moon"	2,569	5,101	7,670	1
13	Koza Mostra	"Bulletproof"	866	1,605	2,471	5
14	Leroybroughtflowers	"Sabotage!"	916	1,301	2,217	6

==== Final ====
The final took place on 15 February 2026. Fourteen songs competed and the winner, "Ferto" performed by Akylas, was selected by a combination of public voting (50%), Greek jury voting (25%) and international jury voting (25%). The Greek jury consisted of Marina Spanou (songwriter), Giannis Vassilopoulos (radio station director), Maria Iliaki (journalist and presenter), Michalis Marinos (actor) and Hara Kefala (vocal coach and music theatre performer), while the international jury consisted of Benedikt Wiehle (journalist at SWR3), Lasha Kapanadze (head of press for Georgia at Eurovision), Jelena Tomašević (Serbian singer), Ludovic Julien Hurel (head of press for France at Eurovision) and Andrei Zapșa (assistant general director and head of program of TRM). In addition to the performances of the competing entries, the guest performer was Christos Mastoras.

Final – 15 February 2026
R/O	Artist	Song	Jury		Public vote				Total	Place
R/O	Artist	Song	Intl.	Greek	Online	SMS	Total	Points	Total	Place
1	Stylianos	"You & I"	4	8	2,419	2,995	5,414	6	18	7
2	D3lta	"Mad About It"	0	5	3,935	13,624	17,559	16	21	6
3	Mikay	"Labyrinth"	3	1	1,084	1,473	2,557	0	4	10
4	Marika	"Daughters of the Sun (A, E, I, O, U)"	0	0	983	1,759	2,742	0	0	13
5	Marseaux	"Hanomai"	8	10	4,279	7,363	11,642	14	32	3
6	Good Job Nicky	"Dark Side of the Moon"	6	7	7,029	19,926	26,955	20	33	2
7	Koza Mostra	"Bulletproof"	2	3	1,593	2,585	4,178	4	9	9
8	Stefi	"Europa"	1	0	1,080	1,997	3,077	0	1	12
9	Rosanna Mailan	"Alma"	0	0	1,481	1,957	3,438	2	2	11
10	Evangelia	"Parea"	10	2	5,196	5,031	10,227	12	24	4
11	Zaf	"Asteio"	7	6	2,640	4,424	7,064	10	23	5
12	Akylas	"Ferto"	12	12	24,706	35,128	59,834	24	48	1
13	Leroybroughtflowers	"Sabotage!"	0	0	593	1,090	1,683	0	0	13
14	Alexandra Sieti	"The Other Side"	5	4	2,252	3,650	5,902	8	17	8

==== Ratings ====
Viewing figures by show
Show	Air date	Viewership (millions)	Share (%)	Ref.
Semi-final 1	11 February 2026	1.63	15.3%	
Semi-final 2	13 February 2026	1.85	17.9%	
Final	15 February 2026	2.664	30.5%	

== At Eurovision ==
The Eurovision Song Contest 2026 took place at the Wiener Stadthalle in Vienna, Austria, and consisted of two semi-finals held on the respective dates of 12 and 14 May and a final on 16 May 2026. All nations with the exceptions of the host country and the "Big Four" (France, Germany, Italy and the United Kingdom) were required to qualify from one of two semi-finals in order to compete for the final; the top ten countries from each semi-final progressed to the final. On 12 January 2026, an allocation draw was held to determine which of the two semi-finals, as well as which half of the show, each country performed in; the European Broadcasting Union (EBU) split up the competing countries into different pots based on voting patterns from previous contests, with countries with favourable voting histories put into the same pot.

=== Semi final ===
Greece was allocated for the first semi final, and later, was announced to perform in position four during the show. Shortly after, the qualification–announcement segment took place, and, at the end of the segment Greece was announced as one of the ten qualifiers, therefore, Greece would move on onto the final.

=== Final ===
Greece performed in the first half of the final, and finished at the 10th place, with 220 points.

=== Voting ===
==== Points awarded to Greece ====
Points awarded to Greece (Semi-final 1)
Score	Televote	Jury
12 points		San Marino
10 points	Israel	Georgia; Serbia
8 points	Germany; Serbia	Moldova
7 points	Belgium; Georgia	Estonia; Israel; Montenegro
6 points	Moldova	
5 points		Germany; Sweden
4 points	Croatia	Croatia; Finland; Poland
3 points	Italy; Montenegro; Portugal; Rest of the World; Sweden	
2 points	Lithuania; Poland	Belgium; Lithuania
1 point	Estonia; San Marino	Portugal

Points awarded to Greece (Final)
Score	Televote	Jury
12 points	Bulgaria; Cyprus; San Marino	Cyprus; Serbia
10 points		
8 points	Albania; Australia; Germany; Luxembourg; Serbia	Moldova; Poland
7 points		
6 points	Belgium; Czechia; Switzerland	Montenegro; San Marino
5 points	Georgia; Israel	Israel
4 points	Armenia; Italy; Rest of the World; Sweden; United Kingdom	Sweden
3 points	Croatia; Estonia; France; Moldova; Romania	Armenia; Estonia
2 points	Austria; Latvia; Malta; Montenegro	Albania; Australia
1 point		Austria; Latvia

==== Points awarded by Greece ====
Points awarded by Greece (Semi-final 1)
Score	Televote	Jury
12 points	Serbia	Poland
10 points	Israel	Serbia
8 points	Moldova	Montenegro
7 points	San Marino	Finland
6 points	Poland	Croatia
5 points	Croatia	Moldova
4 points	Montenegro	Israel
3 points	Finland	Estonia
2 points	Georgia	Lithuania
1 point	Lithuania	Sweden

Points awarded by Greece (Final)
Score	Televote	Jury
12 points	Cyprus	Cyprus
10 points	Bulgaria	Poland
8 points	Albania	France
7 points	Italy	Australia
6 points	Romania	Bulgaria
5 points	Israel	Serbia
4 points	Moldova	Croatia
3 points	Australia	Moldova
2 points	France	Romania
1 point	Croatia	Albania

==== Detailed voting results ====
Each participating broadcaster assembles a seven-member jury panel consisting of music industry professionals who are citizens of the country they represent and two of which have to be between 18 and 25 years old. Each jury, and individual jury member, is required to meet a strict set of criteria regarding professional background, as well as diversity in gender and age. No member of a national jury was permitted to be related in any way to any of the competing acts in such a way that they cannot vote impartially and independently. The individual rankings of each jury member as well as the nation's televoting results were released shortly after the grand final.

The following members comprised the Greek jury:

- Alexis Karakatsanis
- Dimitrios Meidanis
- Ioannis Christodoulopoulos
- Panagiotis Nikolaidis
- Athina Klimi
- Christina Kaliakatsou
- Marina Spanou

Detailed voting results from Greece (Semi-final 1)
R/O	Country	Jury									Televote	
R/O	Country	Juror A	Juror B	Juror C	Juror D	Juror E	Juror F	Juror G	Rank	Points	Rank	Points
01	Moldova	13	6	3	5	4	12	1	6	5	3	8
02	Sweden	11	5	12	13	6	4	10	10	1	11	
03	Croatia	12	4	6	4	3	1	4	5	6	6	5
04	Greece											
05	Portugal	9	13	14	9	12	14	13	14		13	
06	Georgia	14	14	9	8	14	13	12	13		9	2
07	Finland	2	3	8	11	1	3	6	4	7	8	3
08	Montenegro	10	2	2	2	5	9	3	3	8	7	4
09	Estonia	5	11	13	10	8	2	7	8	3	14	
10	Israel	8	12	4	3	11	5	14	7	4	2	10
11	Belgium	4	8	11	14	7	8	11	11		12	
12	Lithuania	1	10	10	12	9	11	8	9	2	10	1
13	San Marino	6	9	7	7	13	10	9	12		4	7
14	Poland	7	1	5	6	2	7	2	1	12	5	6
15	Serbia	3	7	1	1	10	6	5	2	10	1	12

Detailed voting results from Greece (Final)
R/O	Country	Jury									Televote	
R/O	Country	Juror A	Juror B	Juror C	Juror D	Juror E	Juror F	Juror G	Rank	Points	Rank	Points
01	Denmark	13	10	11	13	7	18	14	14		13	
02	Germany	15	15	18	17	18	17	6	16		18	
03	Israel	16	7	4	10	21	4	21	11		6	5
04	Belgium	17	16	20	15	5	16	15	15		22	
05	Albania	8	6	6	8	23	7	12	10	1	3	8
06	Greece											
07	Ukraine	7	18	12	12	12	15	8	13		17	
08	Australia	6	3	3	4	3	13	7	4	7	8	3
09	Serbia	12	20	2	22	9	1	19	6	5	12	
10	Malta	19	17	13	16	16	14	16	20		16	
11	Czechia	21	21	24	19	6	19	18	18		20	
12	Bulgaria	3	4	22	3	13	6	4	5	6	2	10
13	Croatia	5	13	10	5	22	10	3	7	4	10	1
14	United Kingdom	24	24	17	24	19	20	24	23		23	
15	France	9	11	8	2	1	3	5	3	8	9	2
16	Moldova	4	5	7	9	24	8	13	8	3	7	4
17	Finland	11	8	16	6	4	21	9	12		11	
18	Poland	1	1	9	1	8	11	2	2	10	15	
19	Lithuania	22	19	19	23	11	12	17	21		21	
20	Sweden	14	14	15	14	15	22	11	17		14	
21	Cyprus	2	2	1	7	2	2	1	1	12	1	12
22	Italy	18	12	21	18	17	9	20	19		4	7
23	Norway	23	23	14	21	14	23	22	22		19	
24	Romania	10	9	5	11	10	5	10	9	2	5	6
25	Austria	20	22	23	20	20	24	23	24		24	
