= Ferto (song) =

2026 song by Akylas

Single by Akylas

from the album Press Start
- Language: Greek
- Released: 15 February 2026
- Genre: Dance-pop; techno
- Length: 3:00
- Label: Minos EMI
- Songwriters: Akylas Mytilinaios; Orfeas Nonis; Theofilos Pouzbouris; Thomas Papathanasis
- Producers: TEO.x3; Papatanice; Akylas

Akylas singles chronology
"Ela konta (House Mix)" (2025)	"Ferto" (2026)	"To Party" (2026)

Music videos
- "Ferto" on YouTube "Super Ferto" on YouTube

Eurovision Song Contest 2026 entry
- Country: Greece
- Artist: Akylas
- Language: Greek

Finals performance
- Semi-final result: 7th
- Semi-final points: 159
- Final result: 10th
- Final points: 220

Entry chronology
- ◄ "Asteromata" (2025)

Official performance video
- "Ferto" (first semi-final) on YouTube "Ferto" (grand final) on YouTube

"Ferto" (Greek: Φέρτο, lit. 'Bring It') is a song performed by Greek singer Akylas, written by Akylas, Orfeas Nonis, Theofilos Pouzbouris and Thomas Papathanasis, with production handled by Akylas, TEO.x3 and Papatanice. It was released on 15 February 2026 and represented Greece at the Eurovision Song Contest 2026, and finished in tenth place at the final. The song reached number eight on the Greek Local Singles Chart.

== Background and composition ==
Akylas has described "Ferto" as being a combination of "...Greek traditional music, Lyra, with techno modern sounds..." as well as commenting that “Ferto” looks at the beginning like only a funny, dancy song." and "...simply a happy, upbeat dance track without any deeper meaning. " Akylas has then gone on to comment that, "...my friend Orfeas Noni and I wrote the song with the goal of making it a Eurovision entry... ...The song is generally about poverty and overconsumption. The fact is that in this day and age, nothing is ever enough for us. We want more, bigger, eh, more dazzling... ...and in the midst of this quest, the fact that this hero of the song isn’t satisfied with anything stems from the fact that it’s probably pent-up due to deprivation, due to childhood experiences — and I call him a hero because I want to distance myself from it, to create some distance, but in reality, it’s a story based on experience. It’s my own story because I grew up in a home, in a family that had many financial difficulties from a young age."

The writing process for the song came about when music that Akylas had created began to receive a lot of positive responses to it and a friend said to him "...why don’t you try writing a song [for Eurovision]...". Akylas then spoke with Orfeas Noni a friend who he had previously written songs and lyrics with in the past and they wrote "Ferto" together.

== Eurovision Song Contest 2026 ==
=== Sing for Greece 2026 ===
Sing for Greece 2026 was the national final developed by ERT to select its entry for the Eurovision Song Contest 2026. All shows were broadcast on ERT1, ERT World, Second Programme (with commentary by Mikaela Theofilou and Dimitris Meidanis), Voice of Greece and ERT echo, as well as online on ERT's over-the-top media service ERTFLIX. The final was also broadcast on RIK 1 in Cyprus and on the Eurovision Song Contest's official YouTube channel.

The competition consisted of three shows that took place between 11 and 15 February 2026 at the Peiraios 260 in Athens: two semi-finals on 11 and 13 February 2026 and a final on 15 February 2026. 14 songs competed in each semi-final and the top seven entries qualified to the final. The results for the semi-finals were determined exclusively by public voting, while the results in the final were determined by a combination of public and jury voting. Public voting was conducted through SMS and online voting.

On 4 January 2026 during the show Sing for Greece – Ethnikós Telikós Eurovision 2026 – I finalist, broadcast on ERT1, it was announced that Akylas would compete in the Greek national final for the Eurovision Song Contest 2026, dubbed Sing for Greece 2026, with the song "Ferto". After advancing from the first semi-final, he won in the final on 15 February 2026, thus earning the right to represent Greece at the Eurovision Song Contest 2026 in Vienna, Austria.

=== At Eurovision ===
The Eurovision Song Contest 2026 took place at Wiener Stadthalle in Vienna, Austria, and consisted of two semi-finals held on the respective dates of 12 and 14 May and the final on 16 May 2026. During the allocation draw held on 12 January 2026, Greece was assigned to compete in the first semi-final, performing in the former half of the show. After performing, "Ferto" was the first song to be revealed to be moving on to the Grand Finals on 16 May 2026, that Saturday. Greece were drawn to perform in the first half of the final. In the final, Akylas and Ferto gained the 10th place with 220 points. He was awarded with 73 points from the juries and with 147 points from the public.

=== Stage performance ===
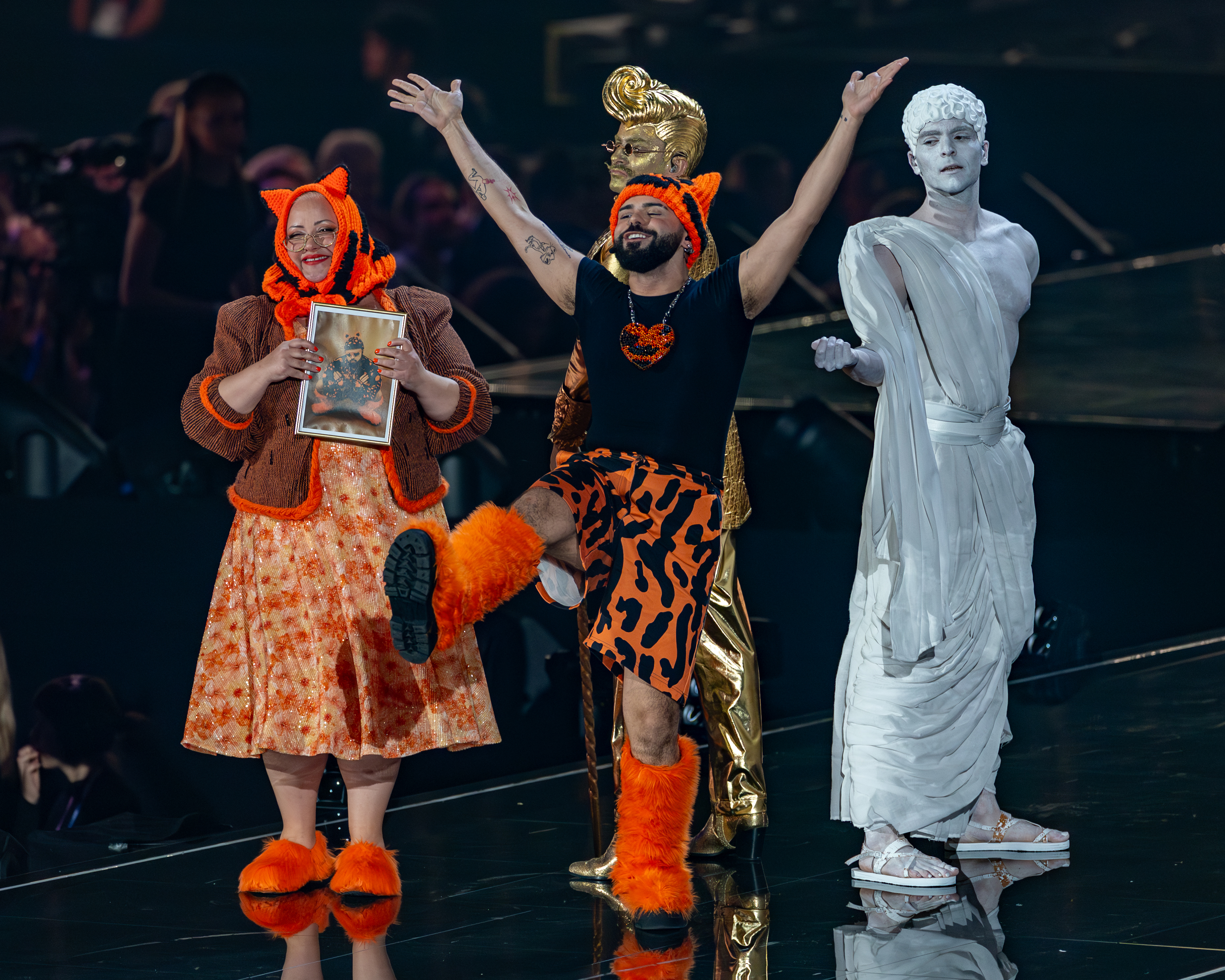
Akylas in Vienna for Eurovision 2026.

The stage performance at Eurovision was directed by Fokas Evangelinos. It begins with the title screen of a computer game being shown and Akylas jumps up to press the start button and begin the game. It then shows Akylas as a video game character moving through a computer game that has a 3D animated version of Athens as its background, whilst Akylas is performing the song on the stage below. Akylas then moves through a hexagon that reflects his image on all six angles. After the first pre-chorus, Akylas makes a callback to the imaginary lyra-playing scene performed by Helena Paparizou in "My Number One" in 2005.

Towards the end of the performance, he moves through a tableau of three scenes where he dances with an old lady in an orange living room, whilst a disco ball spins above them. She holds his picture, symbolizing glory. He then briefly dances with an Ancient Greek statue, whilst the Parthenon on the Acropolis appears on the LED screen at the back of the stage. This symbolizes eternal fame. He then moves into a gold vault, where there is a figure who is entirely covered in gold. There are bars of gold with the word "FERTO" on them. This symbolizes wealth. Akylas then moves to the top of the stage piece that holds the three tableaus and takes off his sunglasses. He begins the bridge of the song singing in a very dramatic ballad style in stark contrast to the vocals in the rest of the song. The lyrics appear in English on the LED at the back of the stage. He begins speaking to his mother and exploring ideas behind his overconsumption saying, " I believe I'm going to make it and offer you what we never had, look mum I'm buying things to fill the gaps in our lives “. Then he resumes the consuming mania in the song by saying, "Of course, if I win, whatever, you get it, so bring it to me."

== Charts ==
Chart performance for "Ferto"
Chart (2026)	Peak position
Austria (Ö3 Austria Top 40)	23
Finland (Suomen virallinen lista)	23
Greece Local (IFPI)	8
Lithuania (AGATA)	26
Sweden (Sverigetopplistan)	45

== Certifications ==
Certifications for "Ferto"
Region	Certification	Certified units/sales
Streaming
Greece (IFPI Greece)	Gold	1,000,000^{†}
^{†} Streaming-only figures based on certification alone.
