= SFG =

SFG may refer to:

== Military ==
- Special Forces Group (Belgium)
- Special Forces Group (Japan)
- Special Forces (United States Army)#Special Forces groups

== Science and Technology ==
- Sum-frequency generation in optical physics
- Signal-flow graph
- Superior frontal gyrus, in the human brain
- Systemic functional grammar

== Events ==
- Sing for Greece, an annual music competition held to select the Greek delegate for the Eurovision Song Contest

== Other ==
- San Francisco Giants, a Major League Baseball team
- SFGate, a news website
- L'Espérance Airport, IATA airport code
- Scouting for Girls, English pop rock band
- "Super Freaky Girl", 2022 single by Nicki Minaj; widely abbreviated to "SFG" by fans
