= Peiraios =

Peiraios may refer to:

- Piraeus, port of Athens
- Peiraios Street, a main road in Athens
  - Peiraios 260 (venue), a venue in Athens
- Peiraios, a minor planet, for which see:
  - List of minor planets: 12001–13000#658
  - Meanings of minor-planet names: 12001–13000#658
- Peiraios, son of Klytios, namesake of the minor planet
