= The Voice of Greece season 7 =

The Voice of Greece
- Season 7
- Hosted by: Giorgos Lianos (Pre-recorded episodes); Doukissa Nomikou (Live Shows); Laura Narjes (backstage in all rounds except Blind Auditions)
- Coaches: Helena Paparizou; Sakis Rouvas; Panos Mouzourakis; Eleonora Zouganeli
- Winner: Ioanna Georgakopoulou
- Winning coach: Helena Paparizou
- Runner-up: Alexandra Sieti

Release
- Original network: Skai TV; Sigma TV
- Original release: September 13, 2020 – February 12, 2021

Season chronology
- ← Previous; Season 6 Next → Season 8

The seventh season of the talent show The Voice of Greece premiered on September 13, 2020, on Skai TV and Sigma TV, for the fifth time. Host Giorgos Lianos, as well as the four coaches from the previous season, Helena Paparizou, Sakis Rouvas, Panos Mouzourakis and Eleonora Zouganeli all returned. After one season hiatus, Laura Narjes returned as the backstage host, replacing Christina Bompa. Doukissa Nomikou hosted only the live shows, because Lianos was in Dominican Republic, where he was hosting the eighth season of Survivor Greece.

Ioanna Georgakopoulou was named the winner of the season on February 12, 2021; marking Helena Paparizou's first win as a coach on The Voice of Greece.

== Teams ==
Color key

- Winner
- Runner-up
- Third place
- Fourth place
- Eliminated in the semi-finals
- Eliminated in the Cross Battles
- Stolen in the Battle rounds
- Eliminated in the Battle rounds
- Stolen in the Knockout rounds
- Eliminated in the Knockout rounds
- Withdrew

Coaches	Top 120 artists				
Panos Mouzourakis					
Panos Mouzourakis	Nikos Dalakas	Lia Michou	Kalena Ktisti	Alexis Nikolas	Myrtali Nomikou
Panos Mouzourakis	Nikoleta Roumelioti	Stefanos Karpetis	~~Fotini Androulidaki~~	~~Konstantinos Krommidas~~	Faidon
Panos Mouzourakis	Maria Neanidou	Grigoris Matsouris	Konstantina Vlasi	~~Nikoleta Roumelioti~~	~~Antigone Zografaki~~
Panos Mouzourakis	Alexandra Goudiou	Vicky Fysekidou	Marina Savvidou	Penelope Leontopoulou	Marina Batsioki
Panos Mouzourakis	Ioanna Tsiri	Margarita Charalambidou	Marina Papantonaki	Stathis Stivachtakis	Iliana & Thanasis
Panos Mouzourakis	Zoe Muratoglou	Costas Vikatos	Vassilis Loukadakis	Andreas Costopoulos	Antonis Faris
Panos Mouzourakis	Christina Stylianou	Fotis Diplaris	Angeliki Sviti		
Helena Paparizou					
Helena Paparizou	Ioanna Georgakopoulou	Alexandra Sieti	Konstantinos Dimitrakopoulos	Konstantinos Krommidas	Stavros Pilichos
Helena Paparizou	Thanos Lambrou	Nikos Nikolaidis	Despina Dimitriou	Stavros Kritikos	Panagiota Vergidou
Helena Paparizou	Elena Symeonidou	Elena Tsigara	Anna Sakka	~~Faidon~~	~~Harris Chalamoutis~~
Helena Paparizou	Paris Katsaros	Duo Joker	Alicia Kalafata	Imat Hasan	Valeria Siel
Helena Paparizou	Anna Maria Deligiorgi	Michalis Vassileiou	Alexandros Fostinis	Mikaela Iakovou	Hara Sourla
Helena Paparizou	Giannis Panteleios	Fotis Tserkas	Petros Gialamas	Alexia Chioti	Alexandra Kaminidou
Helena Paparizou	Vicky Kyriakidou	Irini Pazakou	Kleoniki Chrysanthakopoulou		
Sakis Rouvas					
Sakis Rouvas	Irene Perikleous	Katerina Batalogianni	Marios Pasialis	Javier Silva Escola	Nadia Iarajouli
Sakis Rouvas	Constantina Koutra	Georgia Mani	Antonia Kaouri	~~Nikoleta Roumelioti~~	Manolis Makroglou
Sakis Rouvas	Eliona Sahpazidou	Kelly Michailidou	Eugenia Liakopoulou	~~Elena Tsigara~~	Stamatis Lykos
Sakis Rouvas	Emilios Symvoulidis	Arietta Theodorou	Adrianna Hebisz	Kirsten Aranda	Kelly Katsouli
Sakis Rouvas	Aggelos Moustakas	Leonarda Kalofonou	Pedro Santana	Dino Thoma	Antonis Titakis
Sakis Rouvas	Stefani Ioannou	Sylia Karagianni	Elena Papanikolaou	Vassilis Pritsis	Nadia Vasilopoulou
Sakis Rouvas	Matina Pantzali	Efi Raftopoulou	Stella Tsamboukou		
Eleonora Zouganeli					
Eleonora Zouganeli	Athena Vermi	Marcelino Sherifi	Nikos Papoutsis	Virginia Droggoula	Fotini Androulidaki
Eleonora Zouganeli	Constantina Touni	Spyros Vrachliotis	~~Irene Perikleous~~	Vangelis Karabasis	Nectarios Malogridis
Eleonora Zouganeli	Antigone Zografaki	Harris Chalamoutis	Iris Moutous	~~Georgia Mani~~	~~Anna Sakka~~
Eleonora Zouganeli	~~Maria Neanidou~~	Harris Loukaidis	Dimitris Kiklis	Christina Lioliou	Manolis Kontopanos
Eleonora Zouganeli	Panos Papanikolaou	Valentino	Dominiki Xida	Mary & Sofia Kioskeroglou	Irene Michael - El Masri
Eleonora Zouganeli	Vasiliki Mesi	Anna Saranti	George Tombaziadis	Myra Sifaki	Charitini Panopoulou
Eleonora Zouganeli	Antonis Angelopoulos	Antonis Varthalitis	Katerina Mantziaroglou		
Note: Italicized names are stolen artists (names struck through within former teams).

== Blind auditions ==
The blind auditions began airing on September 13, 2020, and ended on November 22, 2020, being broadcast every Sunday on Skai TV and Sigma TV.

Color key

✔	Coach hit his/her "ΣΕ ΘΕΛΩ (I want you)" button
	Artist defaulted to this coach's team
	Artist elected to join this coach's team
	Artist eliminated with no coach pressing his or her "ΣΕ ΘΕΛΩ (I want you)" button
✘	Coach pressed the "ΣΕ ΘΕΛΩ (I want you)" button, but was blocked by Panos from getting the artist
✘	Coach pressed the "ΣΕ ΘΕΛΩ (I want you)" button, but was blocked by Helena from getting the artist
✘	Coach pressed the "ΣΕ ΘΕΛΩ (I want you)" button, but was blocked by Sakis from getting the artist
✘	Coach pressed the "ΣΕ ΘΕΛΩ (I want you)" button, but was blocked by Eleonora from getting the artist

=== Episode 1 (September 13) ===
The first blind audition episode was broadcast on September 13, 2020.

Order	Artist	Age	Hometown	Song	Coach's and contestant's choices			
Order	Artist	Age	Hometown	Song	Panos	Helena	Sakis	Eleonora
1	Irene Michael - El Masri	27	Athens	"Adexa"	–	–	–	✔
2	Stefani Ioannou	18	Cyprus	"Bellyache"	✔	–	✔	✔
3	Charalambia Kouzapa	22	Cyprus	"Exotiko Harmani"	–	–	–	–
4	Stefanos Karpetis	25	Thessaloniki	"Bruises"	✔	✔	✔	✔
5	Kiki Symiakaki	28	Volos	"Paradothika Se Sena"	–	–	–	–
6	Giannis Panteleios	33	Athens	"Personal Jesus"	–	✔	✔	–
7	Vasiliki Mesi	29	Thessaloniki	"Zilevo"	–	✔	✔	✔
8	Dora Koutsogianni	26	Piraeus	"Piano Fotia"	–	–	–	–
9	Katerina Batalogianni	23	Kavala	"Ego Krasi den Epina"	✔	–	✔	–
10	Myra Sifaki	22	Crete	"Dance Monkey"	✔	–	✔	✔
11	Rafael Tsakmakis	23	Athens	"Chandelier"	–	–	–	–
12	Efi Raftopoulou	33	Athens	"Alone"	–	✔	✔	✔
13	Stathis Stivachtakis	33	Crete	"To Kopeli kai o Drakos"	✔	–	–	–
14	Alexandra Sieti	26	Thessaloniki	"Cry Baby"	✘	✔	✔	✔

=== Episode 2 (September 20) ===
The second blind audition episode was broadcast on September 20, 2020.

Order	Artist	Age	Hometown	Song	Coach's and contestant's choices			
Order	Artist	Age	Hometown	Song	Panos	Helena	Sakis	Eleonora
1	Thalia Siganou	21	Athens	"To Kokkino Foustani"	–	–	–	–
2	Vicky Fysekidou	18	Kavala	"Always Remember Us This Way"	✔	–	✔	✔
3	George Papasolomontos	31	Cyprus	"Me ta Fota Nistagmena (Oi Dalikes)"	–	–	–	–
4	Irini Pazakou	19	Athens	"Scared to Be Lonely"	–	✔	–	✔
5	Marios Pasialis	22	Rhodes	"Anapantita"	✔	–	✔	–
6	Virginia Droggoula	19	Volos	"Prosopika"	✔	–	–	✔
7	Javier Silva Escola	48	Athens	"Nel blu dipinto di blu (Volare)"	✔	✔	✔	✔
8	Petros Loizos	25	Athens	"Afti I Nychta Menei"	–	–	–	–
9	Nikoleta Roumelioti	19	Athens	"You Know I'm No Good"	✔	–	–	–
10	Nikos Dalakas	28	Larissa	"Dio Psemata"	✔	–	✔	✔
11	Antonia Kaouri	23	Athens	"Purple Rain"	✔	✔	✔	✔
12	Ioanna Koutalidou	37	Rhodes	"Mia Chameni Kiriaki"	–	–	–	–
13	Nadia Vasilopoulou	27	Larissa	"I Drove All Night"	✔	–	✔	–
14	Damir Filipancic & Snjezana Vranjesevic (Duo Joker)	60 & 52	Croatia	"We've Got Tonite"	✔	✔	✔	✔

=== Episode 3 (September 27) ===
The third blind audition episode was broadcast on September 27, 2020.

Order	Artist	Age	Hometown	Song	Coach's and contestant's choices			
Order	Artist	Age	Hometown	Song	Panos	Helena	Sakis	Eleonora
1	Erora Hadjidimitriou	35	Athens	"Wish I Knew You"	–	–	–	–
2	Antonis Angelopoulos	20	Patras	"Pou na Exigo"	–	–	–	✔
3	Myrtali Nomikou	23	Athens	"Over the Rainbow"	✔	–	–	✔
4	George Housakos	30	Athens	"Crazy Little Thing Called Love"	–	–	–	–
5	Stavros Kritikos	28	Thessaloniki	"Ti na to Kano"	–	✔	✔	–
6	Manos Georgiadis	18	Kozani	"O Salonikios"	–	–	–	–
7	Charitini Panopoulou	35	Athens	"Ederlezi"	✔	–	–	✔
8	Matina Pantzali	30	Athens	"Barbagiannakakis"	✔	–	✔	–
9	Nikos Filentas	40	Serres	"Apopse tha 'thela"	–	–	–	–
10	Spyros Vrachliotis	17	Corfu	"Stay"	–	✔	✔	✔
11	Elena Tsigara	21	Thessaloniki	"Unstoppable"	✔	✘	✔	✔
12	Stergios Daousanakis	35	Piraeus	"Sta Eipa Ola"	–	–	–	–
13	Paris Katsaros	22	Rhodes	"Sex on Fire"	✔	✔	✘	✔
14	Constantina Koutra	20	Athens	"Rain on Me"	✔	✔	✔	✔
15	Marina Batsioki	21	Thessaloniki	"Stohos"	✔	–	✔	–

=== Episode 4 (October 4) ===
The fourth blind audition episode was broadcast on October 4, 2020.

Order	Artist	Age	Hometown	Song	Coach's and contestant's choices			
Order	Artist	Age	Hometown	Song	Panos	Helena	Sakis	Eleonora
1	Eleni Karahaliou	24	Volos	"Milo gia sena"	–	–	–	–
2	Kleoniki Chrysanthakopoulou	27	Athens	"Sto 'pa kai sto Xanaleo"	–	✔	–	–
3	Dominiki Xida	27	Athens	"Confident"	✔	–	✔	✔
4	Eva Manta	28	Thessaloniki	"S' agapao sou fonaxa"	–	–	–	–
5	Vassilis Loukadakis	38	Athens	"Losing My Religion"	✔	–	✔	–
6	Panagiota Vergidou	17	Thessaloniki	"Taxidi sti Vrohi"	–	✔	✔	✔
7	Lefteris Tsouvalas	29	Salamis	"Sou milo kai Kokkinizis"	–	–	–	–
8	Kelly Michailidou	22	Kavala	"Dancing on My Own"	✔	✔	✔	✔
9	Zoe Muratoglou	35	Athens	"Let the Sunshine In"	✔	–	–	–
10	Vassilis Pritsis	28	Athens	"I Nyhta dio Kommatia"	✔	✔	✔	✔
11	Anna Saranti	33	Athens	"Apo Erota"	–	–	–	✔
12	Imat Hasan	40	Volos	"Always on the Run"	✔	✔	–	–
13	Anna Glykofrydi	29	Athens	"Mazi sou"	–	–	–	–
14	Dimitris Kiklis	36	Athens	"La Foule"	✔	✔	✘	✔

=== Episode 5 (October 11) ===
The fifth blind audition episode was broadcast on October 11, 2020.

Order	Artist	Age	Hometown	Song	Coach's and contestant's choices			
Order	Artist	Age	Hometown	Song	Panos	Helena	Sakis	Eleonora
1	Ismini Stefopoulou	28	Ioannina	"Xana Mana"	–	–	–	–
2	Nikos Papoutsis	36	Amfissa	"I Mana tou Alexandrou"	✔	✔	✔	✔
3	Nikos Bellos	34	Athens	"Anoites Agapes"	–	–	–	–
4	Margarita Charalambidou	22	Piraeus	"Jolene"	✔	–	–	✔
5	Valentino	30	Crete	"Akrogialies Dilina"	✔	✔	✔	✔
6	Savvina Vouldouki	19	Kavala	"Price Tag"	–	–	–	–
7	Manolis Makroglou	26	Samos	"Paraponemena logia"	–	✔	✔	–
8	Costas Vikatos	20	Piraeus	"Tsikaboum"	✔	–	–	–
9	Mary Frangou	20	Cyprus	"Ston Aggelon ta Bouzoukia"	–	–	–	–
10	Elena Symeonidou	22	Crete	"Billie Jean"	✔	✔	✔	✔
11	Maria Symeonidou	20	Thessaloniki	"Stay with Me"	–	–	–	–
12	Konstantinos Dimitrakopoulos	26	Kalamata	"Zise ti Stigmi"	–	✔	✔	✔
13	Nadia Iarajouli	18	Athens	"Lovely"	–	✘	✔	✔
14	Andreas Costopoulos	52	Athens	"Poia Nyxta s' eklepse"	✔	–	–	–
15	Irene Perikleous	17	Cyprus	"I Put a Spell on You"	✔	–	✔	✔

=== Episode 6 (October 18) ===
The sixth blind audition episode was broadcast on October 18, 2020.

Order	Artist	Age	Hometown	Song	Coach's and contestant's choices			
Order	Artist	Age	Hometown	Song	Panos	Helena	Sakis	Eleonora
1	Adrianella Nikolaou	31	Cyprus	"Pyxida"	–	–	–	–
2	Hara Sourla	20	Athens	"New Rules"	–	✔	✔	–
3	Christina Buffina	30	Cyprus	"Still Loving You"	–	–	–	–
4	Iliana & Thanasis	28 & 26	Kavala	"O Oraios ki i Oraia"	✔	–	–	–
5	Harris Chalamoutis	26	Athens	"Ola s' Agapane"	–	✔	✔	✔
6	Panagiota Voziki	21	Athens	"Kamia Fora"	–	–	–	–
7	Alexis Nikolas	34	Thessaloniki	"Careless Whisper"	✔	–	–	✔
8	Valeria Siel	26	Athens	"If I Were a Boy"	✔	✔	✔	–
9	Nikolas Mourtzapis	26	Patras	"To Kyma"	–	–	–	–
10	Athena Vermi	27	Athens	"Na Ziso i na Pethano (Flamenco)"	✔	✔	✔	✔
11	Stefanos Maglaras	24	Athens	"Pes mou giati"	–	–	–	–
12	Angeliki Sviti	18	Chalkidiki	"Fuckin' Perfect"	✔	–	–	–
13	Leonarda Kalofonou	23	Zakynthos	"Way Down We Go"	✔	✔	✔	✔
14	Marios Michos	30	Athens	"Paliokairos"	–	–	–	–
15	Iris Moutous	25	Thessaloniki	"Prin"	✔	✔	✔	✔

=== Episode 7 (October 25) ===
The seventh blind audition episode was broadcast on October 25, 2020.

Order	Artist	Age	Hometown	Song	Coach's and contestant's choices			
Order	Artist	Age	Hometown	Song	Panos	Helena	Sakis	Eleonora
1	Ioanna Tsiri	22	Athens	"Lava"	✔	–	–	–
2	Manolis Kontopanos	32	Piraeus	"Me Skotose giati tin Agapousa"	–	✔	✔	✔
3	Harris Loukaidis	32	Cyprus	"Eleges"	✔	–	–	✔
4	Chrysaugi Tsioli		Samos	"Mi Rotate"	–	–	–	–
5	Arietta Theodorou	45	Piraeus	"Histoire d'un amour"	–	–	✔	✔
6	Sotiris Giazitzioglou	22	Kozani	"Horeyo"	–	–	–	–
7	Adrianna Hebisz	25	Poland	"Part-Time Lover"	–	–	✔	–
8	Giannis Ketzis	27	Athens	"Mera Nyhta"	–	–	–	–
9	Mikaela Iakovou	17	Cyprus	"I Got You (I Feel Good)"	✔	✔	✔	✔
10	Anna Sakka	26	Kalamata	"Ola se Thimizoun"	–	✔	✔	✔
11	Faidon	28	Athens	"Cry Me a River"	✔	✔	✔	✔
12	Maria Daldaki		Crete	"Ego milao gia Dinami"	–	–	–	–
13	Vicky Kyriakidou	20	Kavala	"Tin Patridam' Ehasa"	✔	✔	–	–
14	George Paximadakis	29	Crete	"Tremo"	–	–	–	–
15	Kalena Ktisti	26	Athens	"Shallow"	✔	–	✔	✔

=== Episode 8 (November 1) ===
The eighth blind audition episode was broadcast on November 1, 2020.

Order	Artist	Age	Hometown	Song	Coach's and contestant's choices			
Order	Artist	Age	Hometown	Song	Panos	Helena	Sakis	Eleonora
1	Sofia Zotou	24	Athens	"Se poia Thalassa Armenizis"	–	–	–	–
2	Petros Gialamas	22	Athens	"Watermelon Sugar"	–	✔	✔	–
3	Aggelos Moustakas	19	Lamia	"M' ena sou Vlemma"	–	–	✔	–
4	Penelope Leontopoulou	21	Chalkidiki	"Just Give Me a Reason"	✔	–	✔	–
5	Michalis Vassileiou	39	Aigio	"Vradiazi"	–	✔	–	–
6	Dino Thoma	21	Enfield	"Nobody Knows"	✔	–	✔	–
7	Dimitra Stavraki	19	Piraeus	"Put Your Head on My Shoulder"	–	–	–	–
8	Anna Maria Deligiorgi	29	Piraeus	"Kopse kai Mirase"	✔	✔	✔	✘
9	George Tombaziadis	38	Athens	"Me tous Alites"	–	✔	–	✔
10	Alexandra Goudiou	26	Kozani	"Hit the Road Jack"	✔	–	✔	✔
11	Marcelino Sherifi	26	Crete	"Giati"	✔	✔	✔	✔
12	Thanos Lambrou	19	Athens	"Castle on the Hill"	✔	✔	✔	✔
13	Constantina Touni	26	Germany	"To Arhodopoulo"	–	✔	✔	✔

=== Episode 9 (November 8) ===
The ninth blind audition episode was broadcast on November 8, 2020.

Order	Artist	Age	Hometown	Song	Coach's and contestant's choices			
Order	Artist	Age	Hometown	Song	Panos	Helena	Sakis	Eleonora
1	Alexia Chioti	32	Argos	"Chilies Vradies"	✔	✔	–	–
2	Fotis Diplaris	40	Thessaloniki	"Fly Away"	✔	✔	✔	–
3	Spyros Pinkeridis	22	Athens	"I (Who Have Nothing)"	–	–	–	–
4	Emilios Symvoulidis	30	Artemida	"Megalos Erotas"	–	–	✔	–
5	Despina Dimitriou	30	Volos	"Damn your Eyes"	✔	✔	✔	–
6	Antonis Varthalitis	33	Athens	"Ekini"	✔	–	–	✔
7	Fotis Tserkas	25	Salamina	"You Give Love a Bad Name"	–	✔	–	–
8	Elena Papanikolaou	29	Athens	"Melisses"	✔	✔	✔	–
9	Konstantinos Krommidas	24	Athens	"Creep"	✔	✘	✔	✔
10	Igor Tokin		Athens	"	–	–	–	–
11	Konstantina Vlasi	25	Athens	"Dirty Diana"	✔	✔	✔	–
12	Christina Lioliou	24	Larissa	"O Pasatembos"	✔	✔	✔	✔
13	Ioanna Georgakopoulou	19	Athens	"It's a Man's Man's Man's World"	✔	✔	✔	✔

=== Episode 10 (November 15) ===
The tenth blind audition episode was broadcast on November 15, 2020.

Order	Artist	Age	Hometown	Song	Coach's and contestant's choices			
Order	Artist	Age	Hometown	Song	Panos	Helena	Sakis	Eleonora
1	Nastia Zolota	33	Athens	"Akoma Mia"	–	–	–	–
2	Maria Neanidou	27	Athens	"Leilim Lei"	–	–	✔	✔
3	Takis Aivalis	51	Eleusis	"Burning Love"	–	–	–	–
4	Kelly Katsouli	21	Crete	"I Love You"	–	–	✔	✔
5	Adriana Peppou	21	Cyprus	"Mia Kokkini Grami"	–	–	–	–
6	Kirsten Aranda	17	Athens	"Hallelujah"	–	–	✔	–
7	Georgia Mani	23	Patras	"Zitate na sas po"	–	–	✔	✔
8	George Delogos	26	Mytilene	"Feygo gia Mena"	–	–	–	–
9	Fotini Androulidaki	18	Crete	"Chriso Ftero"	✔	–	✔	–
10	Violeta Jivra	24	Athens	"Fevgo"	–	–	–	–
11	Grigoris Matsouris	25	Athens	"Den eimai Allos"	✔	✔	✔	–
12	Katerina Mantziaroglou	17	Thessaloniki	"Demeni"	✔	–	✔	✔
13	Elisavet Xenou	25	Serres	"Ikariotiko (I Agapi mou stin Ikaria)"	–	–	–	–
14	Stavros Pilichos	30	Euboea	"Os ki h Thalasses"	✔	✔	✔	✔
15	Stella Tsamboukou	26	Athens	"Uninvited"	✔	–	✔	–

=== Episode 11 (November 22) ===
The eleventh blind audition episode was broadcast on November 22, 2020.

Order	Artist	Age	Hometown	Song	Coach's and contestant's choices			
Order	Artist	Age	Hometown	Song	Panos	Helena	Sakis	Eleonora
1	Mary & Sofia Kioskeroglou	31 & 28	Nea Peramos	"Dari Dari"	–	–	–	✔
2	Sylia Karagianni	36	Crete	"Gia senane boro"	–	✔	✔	–
3	Stamatis Lykos	25	Athens	"Counting Stars"	✔	–	✔	–
4	Margarita Dinopoulou	20	Athens	"You Are the Reason"	–	–	–	–
5	Nectarios Malogridis	35	Nea Makri	"Kaigomai kai Sigoliono"	–	✔	✔	✔
6	Dimitris Pelekanos	32	Athens	"Cheimonanthos"	–	–	–	–
7	Christina Stylianou	30	Cyprus	"Prolaveno"	✔	–	–	–
8	Elina Gerodali	30	Athens	"Edeka para"	–	–	–	–
9	Lia Michou	27	Athens	"I Bosa Nova tou Isaiah"	✔	–	✔	–
10	Irenaios Delis	23	Tripoli	"Me dio marmarina filia"	–	–	–	–
11	Alexandra Kaminidou	19	Athens	"Call Out My Name"	✔	✔	✔	✔
12	Alexandros Fostinis	29	Piraeus	"Stand by Me"	–	✔	✔	–
13	Konstantinos Kostelidis	23	Athens	"Ena Chimoniatiko Proi"	–	–	–	–
14	Antigone Zografaki	27	Athens	"Mehri to Telos"	✔	–	✔	–
15	Pedro Santana	55	Athens	"Livin' la Vida Loca"	–	–	✔	✔

=== Episode 12 (November 29) ===
The twelfth and final blind audition episode was broadcast on November 29, 2020.

Order	Artist	Age	Hometown	Song	Coach's and contestant's choices			
Order	Artist	Age	Hometown	Song	Panos	Helena	Sakis	Eleonora
1	Katerina Anastasiadou	29	Piraeus	"Ta Dilina"	–	–	–	–
2	Panos Papanikolaou	23	Trikala	"An mou Tilefonouses"	–	–	✔	✔
3	Maria Bleniou	51	Cyprus	"Anoixe Petra"	–	–	–	–
4	Marina Savvidou	22	Athens	"Bad Things"	✔	–	✔	–
5	Nikos Nikolaidis	38	Athens	"Makria mou na fygis"	✔	✔	✔	✔
6	Lefteris Savvakis	22	Crete	"Xenihtisa stin Porta sou"	–	–	–	–
7	Antonis Faris	37	Cyprus	"Ena Gramma"	✔	–	–	–
8	Chrysafenia Demeti	37	Piraeus	"Mi Milas"	–	–	–	–
9	Antonis Titakis	49	Crete	"O Aygerinos"	–	–	✔	–
10	Alicia Kalafata	22	Rhodes	"Anyone"	✔	✔	✔	✔
11	Vangelis Karabasis	18	Athens	"Den exo palatia kai Lefta"	–	Team full	✔	✔
12	Eliona Sahpazidou	17	Thessaloniki	"Dangerous Woman"	✔	Team full	✔	Team full
13	Andreas Tsakos	30	Athens	"De Milame"	–	Team full	–	Team full
14	Eugenia Liakopoulou	30	Athens	"Sta 'dosa ola"	✔	Team full	✔	Team full
15	Marina Papantonaki	28	Athens	"Bang Bang"	✔	Team full	Team full	Team full

== Knockouts ==
The Knockouts began airing on December 6, 2020, and ended on January 8, 2021. The coaches can each steal two losing artist from another team. Contestants who win their knockout or are stolen by another coach will advance to the Battles. This season the coaches had advisors: Yannis Zouganelis for team Eleonora Zouganeli, Dimitris Starovas for team Panos Mouzourakis, Tamta for team Helena Paparizou and Stelios Rokkos for team Sakis Rouvas.

Colour key

✔	Coach hit his/her "I WANT YOU" button
	Artist won the Knockout and advanced to the Battles
	Artist lost the Knockout but was stolen by another coach and advanced to the Battles
	Artist lost the Knockout and was eliminated

Episode	Coach	Order	Winner		Losers		'Steal' result			
Episode	Coach	Order	Artist	Song	Artists	Song	Panos	Helena	Sakis	Eleonora
Episode 13 (December 6, 2020)	Eleonora Zouganeli	1	Spyros Vrachliotis	"Through the Valley"	Katerina Mantziaroglou	"Stereopita"	–	–	–	—N/a
Episode 13 (December 6, 2020)	Eleonora Zouganeli	1	Spyros Vrachliotis	"Through the Valley"	Antonis Varthalitis	"Markos kai Anna"	–	–	–	—N/a
Episode 13 (December 6, 2020)	Panos Mouzourakis	2	Stefanos Karpetis	"The Blower's Daughter"	Angeliki Sviti	"Zombie"	—N/a	–	–	–
Episode 13 (December 6, 2020)	Panos Mouzourakis	2	Stefanos Karpetis	"The Blower's Daughter"	Fotis Diplaris	"Simple Man"	—N/a	–	–	–
Episode 13 (December 6, 2020)	Sakis Rouvas	3	Javier Silva Escola	"Si me dejas no vale"	Stella Tsamboukou	"Erotiko"	–	–	—N/a	–
Episode 13 (December 6, 2020)	Sakis Rouvas	3	Javier Silva Escola	"Si me dejas no vale"	Efi Raftopoulou	"I Have Nothing"	–	–	—N/a	–
Episode 13 (December 6, 2020)	Helena Paparizou	4	Elena Symeonidou	"Black Velvet"	Kleoniki Chrysanthakopoulou	"Seven Nation Army"	–	—N/a	–	–
Episode 13 (December 6, 2020)	Helena Paparizou	4	Elena Symeonidou	"Black Velvet"	Irini Pazakou	"Million Reasons"	–	—N/a	–	–
Episode 13 (December 6, 2020)	Eleonora Zouganeli	5	Vangelis Karabasis	"Giati pouli m' den kelaidis"	Antonis Angelopoulos	"Fovame"	–	–	–	—N/a
Episode 13 (December 6, 2020)	Eleonora Zouganeli	5	Vangelis Karabasis	"Giati pouli m' den kelaidis"	Charitini Panopoulou	"Na 'ha dyo zoes"	–	–	–	—N/a
Episode 13 (December 6, 2020)	Panos Mouzourakis	6	Lia Michou	"Anthropon Erga"	Christina Stylianou	"Di 'eyhon"	—N/a	–	–	–
Episode 13 (December 6, 2020)	Panos Mouzourakis	6	Lia Michou	"Anthropon Erga"	Antigone Zografaki	"Mikri Patrida"	—N/a	–	–	✔
Episode 13 (December 6, 2020)	Helena Paparizou	7	Ioanna Georgakopoulou	"Love is a lie"	Vicky Kyriakidou	"Ela kai ragise ton Kosmo mou"	–	—N/a	–	–
Episode 13 (December 6, 2020)	Helena Paparizou	7	Ioanna Georgakopoulou	"Love is a lie"	Alexandra Kaminidou	"I See Red"	–	—N/a	–	–
Episode 13 (December 6, 2020)	Eleonora Zouganeli	8	Constantina Touni	"Ta Xehorismata"	Myra Sifaki	"Crazy in Love"	–	–	–	—N/a
Episode 13 (December 6, 2020)	Eleonora Zouganeli	8	Constantina Touni	"Ta Xehorismata"	George Tombaziadis	"Den Iparhoune Logia"	–	–	–	—N/a
Episode 13 (December 6, 2020)	Sakis Rouvas	9	Kelly Michailidou	"Writing's on the Wall"	Matina Pantzali	"Thimos"	–	–	—N/a	–
Episode 13 (December 6, 2020)	Sakis Rouvas	9	Kelly Michailidou	"Writing's on the Wall"	Elena Tsigara	"Tough Lover"	–	✔	—N/a	–
Episode 13 (December 6, 2020)	Panos Mouzourakis	10	Nikos Dalakas	"Kripsou"	Antonis Faris	"Etsi kai Allios"	—N/a	–	–	–
Episode 13 (December 6, 2020)	Panos Mouzourakis	10	Nikos Dalakas	"Kripsou"	Andreas Costopoulos	"Canzone per te"	—N/a	–	–	–
Episode 14 (December 13, 2020)	Eleonora Zouganeli	1	Athena Vermi	"Se mia shedia"	Anna Saranti	"To diko sou to marazi"	–	–	–	—N/a
Episode 14 (December 13, 2020)	Eleonora Zouganeli	1	Athena Vermi	"Se mia shedia"	Vasiliki Mesi	"Allon eheis tora Agkalia"	–	–	–	—N/a
Episode 14 (December 13, 2020)	Sakis Rouvas	2	Constantina Koutra	"Break My Heart"	Nadia Vasilopoulou	"Because of You"	–	–	—N/a	–
Episode 14 (December 13, 2020)	Sakis Rouvas	2	Constantina Koutra	"Break My Heart"	Vassilis Pritsis	"Ela na deis"	–	–	—N/a	–
Episode 14 (December 13, 2020)	Panos Mouzourakis	3	Grigoris Matsouris	"Iron Sky"	Costas Vikatos	"Tou Agaiou Ta Blues"	—N/a	–	–	–
Episode 14 (December 13, 2020)	Panos Mouzourakis	3	Grigoris Matsouris	"Iron Sky"	Vassilis Loukadakis	"Enas Tourkos Sto Parisi"	—N/a	–	–	–
Episode 14 (December 13, 2020)	Helena Paparizou	4	Nikos Nikolaidis	"Dos' mou t' Athanato Nero"	Alexia Chioti	"Dyo Fones"	–	—N/a	–	–
Episode 14 (December 13, 2020)	Helena Paparizou	4	Nikos Nikolaidis	"Dos' mou t' Athanato Nero"	Harris Chalamoutis	"An M' Agapouses"	–	—N/a	–	✔
Episode 14 (December 13, 2020)	Helena Paparizou	5	Stavros Pilichos	"Confide in Me"	Petros Gialamas	"Fairytale Gone Bad"	–	—N/a	–	Team full
Episode 14 (December 13, 2020)	Helena Paparizou	5	Stavros Pilichos	"Confide in Me"	Fotis Tserkas	"Lexeis"	–	—N/a	–	Team full
Episode 14 (December 13, 2020)	Eleonora Zouganeli	6	Nikos Papoutsis	"Oneiro Apatilo"	Irene Michael - El Masri	"Me Tsigara Varia"	–	–	–	Team full
Episode 14 (December 13, 2020)	Eleonora Zouganeli	6	Nikos Papoutsis	"Oneiro Apatilo"	Maria Neanidou	"Ragisa"	✔	–	–	Team full
Episode 14 (December 13, 2020)	Panos Mouzourakis	7	Konstantinos Krommidas	"Fix You"	Zoe Muratoglou	"Lady Marmalade"	—N/a	–	–	Team full
Episode 14 (December 13, 2020)	Panos Mouzourakis	7	Konstantinos Krommidas	"Fix You"	Nikoleta Roumelioti	"The House of the Rising Sun"	—N/a	–	✔	Team full
Episode 14 (December 13, 2020)	Sakis Rouvas	8	Eliona Sahpazidou	"Je t'aime"	Elena Papanikolaou	"Dyo Meres Mono"	–	–	—N/a	Team full
Episode 14 (December 13, 2020)	Sakis Rouvas	8	Eliona Sahpazidou	"Je t'aime"	Sylia Karagianni	"Chartopolemos"	–	–	—N/a	Team full
Episode 14 (December 13, 2020)	Helena Paparizou	9	Alexandra Sieti	"A Song for You"	Giannis Panteleios	"Nutshell"	–	—N/a	–	Team full
Episode 14 (December 13, 2020)	Helena Paparizou	9	Alexandra Sieti	"A Song for You"	Hara Sourla	"Alive"	–	—N/a	–	Team full
Episode 14 (December 13, 2020)	Sakis Rouvas	10	Eugenia Liakopoulou	"Etsi Xafnika"	Stefani Ioannou	"Runnin' (Lose It All)"	–	–	—N/a	Team full
Episode 14 (December 13, 2020)	Sakis Rouvas	10	Eugenia Liakopoulou	"Etsi Xafnika"	Antonis Titakis	"Tragoudo"	–	–	—N/a	Team full
Episode 15 (December 20, 2020)	Panos Mouzourakis	1	Fotini Androulidaki	"Anathema se"	Stathis Stivachtakis	"Ayton ton kosmo ton kalo"	—N/a	–	–	Team full
Episode 15 (December 20, 2020)	Panos Mouzourakis	1	Fotini Androulidaki	"Anathema se"	Iliana & Thanasis	"Tosa Kalokairia"	—N/a	–	–	Team full
Episode 15 (December 20, 2020)	Helena Paparizou	2	Thanos Lambrou	"Before You Go"	Alexandros Fostinis	"Amore"	–	—N/a	–	Team full
Episode 15 (December 20, 2020)	Helena Paparizou	2	Thanos Lambrou	"Before You Go"	Mikaela Iakovou	"River"	–	—N/a	–	Team full
Episode 15 (December 20, 2020)	Sakis Rouvas	3	Katerina Batalogianni	"O Doctor"	Pedro Santana	"Beautiful Maria of My Soul"	–	–	—N/a	Team full
Episode 15 (December 20, 2020)	Sakis Rouvas	3	Katerina Batalogianni	"O Doctor"	Dino Thoma	"Who's Lovin' You"	–	–	—N/a	Team full
Episode 15 (December 20, 2020)	Eleonora Zouganeli	4	Irene Perikleous	"Me voy"	Dominiki Xida	"Bad Romance"	–	–	–	Team full
Episode 15 (December 20, 2020)	Eleonora Zouganeli	4	Irene Perikleous	"Me voy"	Mary & Sofia Kioskeroglou	"Ela pame s' ena meros"	–	–	–	Team full
Episode 15 (December 20, 2020)	Helena Paparizou	5	Konstantinos Dimitrakopoulos	"Ola mou ta s'agapo"	Anna Maria Deligiorgi	"Misise me"	–	—N/a	–	Team full
Episode 15 (December 20, 2020)	Helena Paparizou	5	Konstantinos Dimitrakopoulos	"Ola mou ta s'agapo"	Michalis Vassileiou	"Chionanthropos"	–	—N/a	–	Team full
Episode 15 (December 20, 2020)	Eleonora Zouganeli	6	Marcelino Sherifi	"Aporo"	Panos Papanikolaou	"Thalasses"	–	–	–	Team full
Episode 15 (December 20, 2020)	Eleonora Zouganeli	6	Marcelino Sherifi	"Aporo"	Valentino	"Vradia Aximerota"	–	–	–	Team full
Episode 15 (December 20, 2020)	Sakis Rouvas	7	Antonia Kaouri	"Listen"	Aggelos Moustakas	"Etsi agapao ego"	–	–	—N/a	Team full
Episode 15 (December 20, 2020)	Sakis Rouvas	7	Antonia Kaouri	"Listen"	Leonarda Kalofonou	"Never Enough"	–	–	—N/a	Team full
Episode 15 (December 20, 2020)	Panos Mouzourakis	8	Myrtali Nomikou	"In My Dreams"	Margarita Charalambidou	"Sign of the Times"	—N/a	–	–	Team full
Episode 15 (December 20, 2020)	Panos Mouzourakis	8	Myrtali Nomikou	"In My Dreams"	Marina Papantonaki	"My Funny Valentine"	—N/a	–	–	Team full
Episode 15 (December 20, 2020)	Eleonora Zouganeli	9	Nectarios Malogridis	"Arabesk"	Georgia Mani	"Metrisa"	–	–	✔	Team full
Episode 15 (December 20, 2020)	Eleonora Zouganeli	9	Nectarios Malogridis	"Arabesk"	Anna Sakka	"Den s'adiko"	✔	✔	Team full	Team full
Episode 15 (December 20, 2020)	Sakis Rouvas	10	Marios Pasialis	"Noyma"	Kirsten Aranda	"And I Am Telling You I'm Not Going"	–	Team full	Team full	Team full
Episode 15 (December 20, 2020)	Sakis Rouvas	10	Marios Pasialis	"Noyma"	Kelly Katsouli	"Something's Got a Hold on Me"	–	Team full	Team full	Team full
Episode 16 (January 8, 2021)	Sakis Rouvas	1	Manolis Makroglou	"Tou Kato kosmou ta Poulia"	Adrianna Hebisz	"Physical"	–	Team full	Team full	Team full
Episode 16 (January 8, 2021)	Sakis Rouvas	1	Manolis Makroglou	"Tou Kato kosmou ta Poulia"	Arietta Theodorou	"Dyo prassina Matia"	–	Team full	Team full	Team full
Episode 16 (January 8, 2021)	Helena Paparizou	2	Stavros Kritikos	"Agapa me"	Valeria Siel	"Euphoria"	–	Team full	Team full	Team full
Episode 16 (January 8, 2021)	Helena Paparizou	2	Stavros Kritikos	"Agapa me"	Imat Hasan	"Died in Your Arms Tonight"	–	Team full	Team full	Team full
Episode 16 (January 8, 2021)	Eleonora Zouganeli	3	Iris Moutous	"Ftanei-Ftanei (I Zoi mou kyklous kanei)"	Manolis Kontopanos	"Itane Lathos Mou"	–	Team full	Team full	Team full
Episode 16 (January 8, 2021)	Eleonora Zouganeli	3	Iris Moutous	"Ftanei-Ftanei (I Zoi mou kyklous kanei)"	Christina Lioliou	"Samba mou xigiese"	–	Team full	Team full	Team full
Episode 16 (January 8, 2021)	Panos Mouzourakis	4	Kalena Ktisti	"Piece of My Heart"	Ioanna Tsiri	"Koita Me"	—N/a	Team full	Team full	Team full
Episode 16 (January 8, 2021)	Panos Mouzourakis	4	Kalena Ktisti	"Piece of My Heart"	Marina Batsioki	"Mia Fora ki Enan Kairo"	—N/a	Team full	Team full	Team full
Episode 16 (January 8, 2021)	Sakis Rouvas	5	Nadia Iarajouli	"Wrecking Ball"	Emilios Symvoulidis	"Erota Thee kai Klefti"	–	Team full	Team full	Team full
Episode 16 (January 8, 2021)	Sakis Rouvas	5	Nadia Iarajouli	"Wrecking Ball"	Stamatis Lykos	"Drag Me Down"	–	Team full	Team full	Team full
Episode 16 (January 8, 2021)	Helena Paparizou	6	Despina Dimitriou	"Fool for You"	Alicia Kalafata	"Lay Me Down"	–	Team full	Team full	Team full
Episode 16 (January 8, 2021)	Helena Paparizou	6	Despina Dimitriou	"Fool for You"	Duo Joker	"Spente Le Stelle"	–	Team full	Team full	Team full
Episode 16 (January 8, 2021)	Eleonora Zouganeli	7	Virginia Droggoula	"Pragmata"	Dimitris Kiklis	"Mi m' afineis mi"	–	Team full	Team full	Team full
Episode 16 (January 8, 2021)	Eleonora Zouganeli	7	Virginia Droggoula	"Pragmata"	Harris Loukaidis	"Fila Me"	–	Team full	Team full	Team full
Episode 16 (January 8, 2021)	Panos Mouzourakis	8	Alexis Nikolas	"Julia"	Penelope Leontopoulou	"To Love Somebody"	—N/a	Team full	Team full	Team full
Episode 16 (January 8, 2021)	Panos Mouzourakis	8	Alexis Nikolas	"Julia"	Marina Savvidou	"Rolling in the Deep"	—N/a	Team full	Team full	Team full
Episode 16 (January 8, 2021)	Helena Paparizou	9	Panagiota Vergidou	"La Llorona"	Faidon	"Never Gonna Give You Up"	✔	Team full	Team full	Team full
Episode 16 (January 8, 2021)	Helena Paparizou	9	Panagiota Vergidou	"La Llorona"	Paris Katsaros	"Misi Kardia"	Team full	Team full	Team full	Team full
Episode 16 (January 8, 2021)	Panos Mouzourakis	10	Konstantina Vlasi	"Mamma Knows Best"	Vicky Fysekidou	"Killing Me Softly with His Song"	Team full	Team full	Team full	Team full
Episode 16 (January 8, 2021)	Panos Mouzourakis	10	Konstantina Vlasi	"Mamma Knows Best"	Alexandra Goudiou	"Down in the Bottom"	Team full	Team full	Team full	Team full

Non-competition performances
Order	Performer	Song
13.1	Eleonora Zouganeli and Yannis Zouganelis	"Na Fylagese"
14.1	Panos Mouzourakis and Dimitris Starovas	"La la la"/"Dance me to the end of love"
15.1	Helena Paparizou and Tamta	"Be My Lover"/"Can't Get You Out Of My Head"
16.1	Sakis Rouvas and Stelios Rokkos	"Den Fobithika"/"Oso Exw Esena"

== Battles ==
The Battles started on January 15, 2021, and ended on January 22, 2021. The coaches can each steal one losing artist from another team. Contestants who win their battle or are stolen by another coach will advance to the Live Shows. After announcing Konstantina Vlasi's withdrawal from the competition, Panos Mouzourakis grouped three of his team members into one battle, in which two contestants from the trio advanced, with the third eliminated.

Colour key

✔	Coach hit his/her "I WANT YOU" button
	Artist won the Battle and advanced to the Live Shows
	Artist lost the Battle but was stolen by another coach and advances to the Live Shows
	Artist lost the Battle and was eliminated

Episode	Coach	Order	Winner(s)	Song	Loser	'Steal' result			
Episode	Coach	Order	Winner(s)	Song	Loser	Panos	Helena	Sakis	Eleonora
Episode 17 (January 15, 2021)	Eleonora Zouganeli	1	Athena Vermi	"Mavro Chioni"	Iris Moutous	–	–	–	—N/a
Episode 17 (January 15, 2021)	Sakis Rouvas	2	Katerina Batalogianni	"To Agriolouloudo"	Eugenia Liakopoulou	–	–	—N/a	–
Episode 17 (January 15, 2021)	Helena Paparizou	3	Nikos Nikolaidis	"Me les Agapi"	Anna Sakka	–	—N/a	–	–
Episode 17 (January 15, 2021)	Panos Mouzourakis	4	Myrtali Nomikou	"Come What May"	Grigoris Matsouris	—N/a	–	–	–
Episode 17 (January 15, 2021)	Eleonora Zouganeli	5	Marcelino Sherifi	"Enas Kompos i Chara mou"	Harris Chalamoutis	–	–	–	—N/a
Episode 17 (January 15, 2021)	Helena Paparizou	6	Konstantinos Dimitrakopoulos	"Den exei sidera i Kardia sou"	Elena Tsigara	–	—N/a	–	–
Episode 17 (January 15, 2021)	Eleonora Zouganeli	7	Virginia Droggoula	"Ton Eayto tou Paidi"	Antigone Zografaki	–	–	–	—N/a
Episode 17 (January 15, 2021)	Sakis Rouvas	8	Antonia Kaouri	"Gangsta's Paradise"/"Survivor"	Nadia Iarajouli	–	–	—N/a	–
Episode 17 (January 15, 2021)	Helena Paparizou	9	Alexandra Sieti	"I'm Outta Love"	Elena Symeonidou	–	—N/a	–	–
Episode 17 (January 15, 2021)	Sakis Rouvas	10	Javier Silva Escola	"Fragile"/"Fragilidad"	Nikoleta Roumelioti	✔	–	—N/a	–
Episode 17 (January 15, 2021)	Panos Mouzourakis	11	Stefanos Karpetis	"Angie"	Konstantinos Krommidas	Team full	✔	✔	✔
Episode 18 (January 22, 2021)	Eleonora Zouganeli	1	Constantina Touni	"Chromata"	Nectarios Malogridis	Team full	Team full	–	—N/a
Episode 18 (January 22, 2021)	Helena Paparizou	2	Thanos Lambrou	"Dearly Departed"	Panagiota Vergidou	Team full	Team full	–	–
Episode 18 (January 22, 2021)	Sakis Rouvas	3	Georgia Mani	"O Aggelos mou"	Kelly Michailidou	Team full	Team full	—N/a	–
Episode 18 (January 22, 2021)	Panos Mouzourakis	4	Nikos Dalakas	"Adikrista"	Maria Neanidou	Team full	Team full	–	–
Episode 18 (January 22, 2021)	Eleonora Zouganeli	5	Nikos Papoutsis	"Gonia Gonia"	Vangelis Karabasis	Team full	Team full	–	—N/a
Episode 18 (January 22, 2021)	Helena Paparizou	6	Stavros Pilichos	"I Esy I Ego"	Stavros Kritikos	Team full	Team full	–	–
Episode 18 (January 22, 2021)	Sakis Rouvas	7	Constantina Koutra	"River Deep – Mountain High"	Eliona Sahpazidou	Team full	Team full	—N/a	–
Episode 18 (January 22, 2021)	Panos Mouzourakis	8	Lia Michou	"Kathreftis"	Fotini Androulidaki	Team full	Team full	–	✔
Episode 18 (January 22, 2021)	Helena Paparizou	9	Ioanna Georgakopoulou	"Big in Japan"	Despina Dimitriou	Team full	Team full	–	Team full
Episode 18 (January 22, 2021)	Panos Mouzourakis	10	Alexis Nikolas	"Earth Song"	Faidon	Team full	Team full	–	Team full
Episode 18 (January 22, 2021)	Panos Mouzourakis	10	Kalena Ktisti	"Earth Song"	Faidon	Team full	Team full	–	Team full
Episode 18 (January 22, 2021)	Sakis Rouvas	11	Marios Pasialis	"Ximeroni"	Manolis Makroglou	Team full	Team full	—N/a	Team full
Episode 18 (January 22, 2021)	Eleonora Zouganeli	12	Spyros Vrachliotis	"Location"	Irene Perikleous	Team full	Team full	✔	Team full

== Live shows ==
The live shows began airing on January 28, 2021. Like in the previous seasons, in the first week were the cross battles, then was the semi-final, but this season was only for one live and the last stage was the final. It was announced that Antonia Kaouri will not be participating in the live shows for personal reasons and will be replaced by Nadia Iarajouli.

Color key

Artist was saved by the public's vote
Artist was eliminated by the public's vote

=== Week 1: Cross Battles (January 28 & 29) ===
Episode	Duel	Order	Coach	Artist	Song	Public Vote	Result
Episode 19 (January 28, 2021)	I	1	Helena Paparizou	Nikos Nikolaidis	"S' Agapo"	49%	Eliminated
Episode 19 (January 28, 2021)	I	2	Sakis Rouvas	Javier Silva Escola	"Un' Altra Te"	51%	Saved
Episode 19 (January 28, 2021)	II	3	Sakis Rouvas	Georgia Mani	"Milo gia Sena"	48%	Eliminated
Episode 19 (January 28, 2021)	II	4	Eleonora Zouganeli	Athena Vermi	"Treno"	52%	Saved
Episode 19 (January 28, 2021)	III	5	Helena Paparizou	Stavros Pilichos	"Poso mou Lipis"	51%	Saved
Episode 19 (January 28, 2021)	III	6	Panos Mouzourakis	Stefanos Karpetis	"Time is running out"	49%	Eliminated
Episode 19 (January 28, 2021)	IV	7	Panos Mouzourakis	Nikos Dalakas	"Odi sto Georgio Karaiskaki"	72%	Saved
Episode 19 (January 28, 2021)	IV	8	Eleonora Zouganeli	Spyros Vrachliotis	"Hello"	28%	Eliminated
Episode 19 (January 28, 2021)	V	9	Eleonora Zouganeli	Constantina Touni	"Fisixe o Vardaris"	49%	Eliminated
Episode 19 (January 28, 2021)	V	10	Helena Paparizou	Konstantinos Dimitrakopoulos	"Athina mou"	51%	Saved
Episode 19 (January 28, 2021)	VI	11	Panos Mouzourakis	Nikoleta Roumelioti	"Who's Lovin' You"	38%	Eliminated
Episode 19 (January 28, 2021)	VI	12	Sakis Rouvas	Marios Pasialis	"Pou na 'sai"	62%	Saved
Episode 19 (January 28, 2021)	VII	13	Helena Paparizou	Ioanna Georgakopoulou	"Wicked Game"	66%	Saved
Episode 19 (January 28, 2021)	VII	14	Eleonora Zouganeli	Fotini Androulidaki	"Aeriko"	34%	Eliminated
Episode 20 (January 29, 2021)	I	1	Sakis Rouvas	Constantina Koutra	"Hallucinate"	24%	Eliminated
Episode 20 (January 29, 2021)	I	2	Eleonora Zouganeli	Marcelino Sherifi	"Gia pou to vales Kardia mou"	76%	Saved
Episode 20 (January 29, 2021)	II	3	Sakis Rouvas	Katerina Batalogianni	"Kaimo mes stin Kardoula mou"	57%	Saved
Episode 20 (January 29, 2021)	II	4	Panos Mouzourakis	Myrtali Nomikou	"The Winner Takes It All"	43%	Eliminated
Episode 20 (January 29, 2021)	III	5	Panos Mouzourakis	Kalena Ktisti	"Karavi"	53%	Saved
Episode 20 (January 29, 2021)	III	6	Helena Paparizou	Thanos Lambrou	"Someone like You"	47%	Eliminated
Episode 20 (January 29, 2021)	IV	7	Helena Paparizou	Konstantinos Krommidas	"Make It Rain"	61%	Saved
Episode 20 (January 29, 2021)	IV	8	Sakis Rouvas	Nadia Iarajouli	"Take Me to Church"	39%	Eliminated
Episode 20 (January 29, 2021)	V	9	Panos Mouzourakis	Lia Michou	"Poso ligo me xereis"	54%	Saved
Episode 20 (January 29, 2021)	V	10	Eleonora Zouganeli	Virginia Droggoula	"Ena Tragoudi akoma"	46%	Eliminated
Episode 20 (January 29, 2021)	VI	11	Panos Mouzourakis	Alexis Nikolas	"The Phantom of the Opera"	37%	Eliminated
Episode 20 (January 29, 2021)	VI	12	Sakis Rouvas	Irene Perikleous	"People Help the People"	63%	Saved
Episode 20 (January 29, 2021)	VII	13	Helena Paparizou	Alexandra Sieti	"Think"	56%	Saved
Episode 20 (January 29, 2021)	VII	14	Eleonora Zouganeli	Nikos Papoutsis	"Ekato fores Kommatia"	44%	Eliminated

Non-competition performances
Order	Performer	Song
19.1	Eleonora Zouganeli	"Stathero"
19.2	Panos Mouzourakis	"Berdemenos"
20.1	Helena Paparizou	"Anamoni"
20.2	Sakis Rouvas	"Iperanthropos"

=== Week 2: Semi-final (February 5) ===
Episode	Order	Coach	Artist	Song	Result
Episode 21 (February 5, 2021)	1	Sakis Rouvas	Irene Perikleous	"I Sklava"	Saved
Episode 21 (February 5, 2021)	2	Helena Paparizou	Stavros Pilichos	"Alexandras"	Eliminated
Episode 21 (February 5, 2021)	3	Panos Mouzourakis	Lia Michou	"To Metrima"	Saved
Episode 21 (February 5, 2021)	4	Helena Paparizou	Konstantinos Dimitrakopoulos	"Mi Fygeis Tora"	Saved
Episode 21 (February 5, 2021)	5	Eleonora Zouganeli	Athena Vermi	"Poios na Sygrithi mazi sou"	Saved
Episode 21 (February 5, 2021)	6	Sakis Rouvas	Javier Silva Escola	"Take On Me"	Eliminated
Episode 21 (February 5, 2021)	7	Helena Paparizou	Alexandra Sieti	"Somebody to Love"	Saved
Episode 21 (February 5, 2021)	8	Panos Mouzourakis	Nikos Dalakas	"To Party"	Saved
Episode 21 (February 5, 2021)	9	Sakis Rouvas	Katerina Batalogianni	"Dyo Nyxtes"/"Alimono"	Saved
Episode 21 (February 5, 2021)	10	Helena Paparizou	Ioanna Georgakopoulou	"Long Train Runnin'"	Saved
Episode 21 (February 5, 2021)	11	Eleonora Zouganeli	Marcelino Sherifi	"Thelo na me Nioseis"	Saved
Episode 21 (February 5, 2021)	12	Panos Mouzourakis	Kalena Ktisti	"To Xeirokrotima"	Eliminated
Episode 21 (February 5, 2021)	13	Sakis Rouvas	Marios Pasialis	"Tha mai Edo"	Eliminated
Episode 21 (February 5, 2021)	14	Helena Paparizou	Konstantinos Krommidas	"Caruso"	Eliminated

=== Week 3: Final (February 12) ===
Coach	Artist	Order	First Song	Order	Second Song	Order	Third Song	Result
Helena Paparizou	Konstantinos Dimitrakopoulos	1	"Fyge"	N/A (already eliminated)				Fourth place
Sakis Rouvas	Irene Perikleous	2	"Mamma Knows Best"	10	"Me Voy"	N/A (already eliminated)		Third place
Panos Mouzourakis	Lia Michou	3	"Ti Foni mou na vro"	N/A (already eliminated)				Fourth place
Eleonora Zouganeli	Athena Vermi	4	"An eínai i Agapi amartia"	N/A (already eliminated)				Fourth place
Sakis Rouvas	Katerina Batalogianni	5	"Tis Tavernas to Roloi"	N/A (already eliminated)				Fourth place
Helena Paparizou	Ioanna Georgakopoulou	6	"Lovely"	11	"Love is a lie"	15	"It's a Man's Man's Man's World"	Winner
Panos Mouzourakis	Nikos Dalakas	7	"Shima Logou"	13	"Kripsou"	N/A (already eliminated)		Third place
Eleonora Zouganeli	Marcelino Sherifi	8	"Son Theo Eftago Tama"	N/A (already eliminated)				Fourth place
Helena Paparizou	Alexandra Sieti	9	"Let it Be"	12	"Cry Baby"	14	"Think"	Runner-up

== Ratings ==
Episode		Date	Timeslot (EET)	Ratings	Viewers (in millions)	Rank		Share		Source
Episode		Date	Timeslot (EET)	Ratings	Viewers (in millions)	Daily	Weekly	Household	Adults 18-54	Source
1	"Blind Auditions"	September 13, 2020	Sunday 9:00pm	11.8%	1.217	#1	#1	34.0%	29.9%	
2	"Blind Auditions"	September 20, 2020	Sunday 9:00pm	12.8%	1.320	#1	#2	32.5%	29.4%	
3	"Blind Auditions"	September 27, 2020	Sunday 9:00pm	14.1%	1.460	#1	#2	34.9%	29.9%	
4	"Blind Auditions"	October 4, 2020	Sunday 9:00pm	14.0%	1.446	#1	#5	35.4%	28.3%	
5	"Blind Auditions"	October 11, 2020	Sunday 9:00pm	14.6%	1.512	#1	#4	36.5%	29.1%	
6	"Blind Auditions"	October 18, 2020	Sunday 9:00pm	14.5%	1.500	#1	#4	35.7%	27.7%	
7	"Blind Auditions"	October 25, 2020	Sunday 9:00pm	14.9%	1.539	#1	#3	37.9%	32.5%	
8	"Blind Auditions"	November 1, 2020	Sunday 9:00pm	15.9%	1.643	#1	#2	37.9%	29.7%	
9	"Blind Auditions"	November 8, 2020	Sunday 9:00pm	16.0%	1.654	#1	#2	34.9%	28.8%	
10	"Blind Auditions"	November 15, 2020	Sunday 9:00pm	16.5%	1.703	#1	#1	34.8%	26.6%	
11	"Blind Auditions"	November 22, 2020	Sunday 9:00pm	17.1%	1.775	#1	#1	36.3%	28.8%	
12	"Blind Auditions"	November 29, 2020	Sunday 9:00pm	16.7%	1.727	#1	#1	35.3%	24.6%	
13	"Knockouts"	December 6, 2020	Sunday 9:00pm	15.6%	1.611	#1	#2	36.2%	29.0%	
14	"Knockouts"	December 13, 2020	Sunday 9:00pm	15.2%	1.572	#1	#5	33.3%	27.5%	
15	"Knockouts"	December 20, 2020	Sunday 9:00pm	12.8%	1.323	#1	#6	28.1%	20.1%	
16	"Knockouts"	January 8, 2021	Friday 9:00pm	11.3%	1.167	#1	#10	24.6%	19.8%	
17	"Battles"	January 15, 2021	Friday 9:00pm	10.9%	1.131	#1	#12	23.1%	16.7%	
18	"Battles"	January 22, 2021	Friday 9:00pm	10.3%	1.067	#1	#14	22.6%	16.8%	
19	"Live Shows"	January 28, 2021	Thursday 10:00pm	6.8%	0.706	#6	—N/a^{1}	18.4%	13.2%	
20	"Live Shows"	January 29, 2021	Friday 9:00pm	10.1%	1.049	#1	#15	22.7%	16.8%	
21	"Live Shows"	February 5, 2021	Friday 9:00pm	8.6%	0.889	#5	—N/a^{1}	19.7%	12.8%	
22	"Live Shows"	February 12, 2021	Friday 9:00pm	9.9%	1.028	#3	#15	24.3%	17.9%	

Note

1. Outside top 20.
