= Doukissa Nomikou =

Greek tv presenter and model

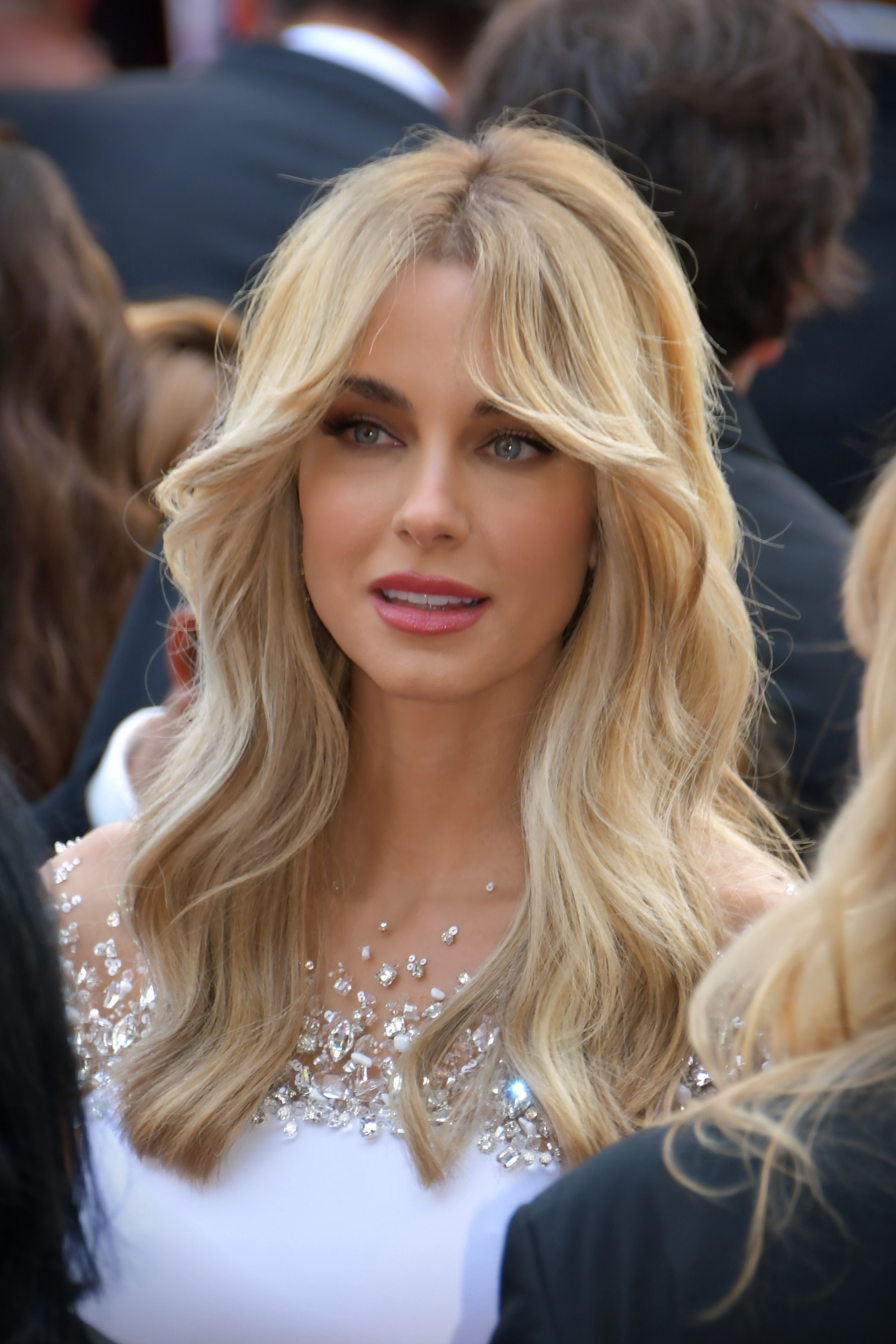
- Doukissa Nomikou Cannes 2025
- Born: Doukissa Nomikou; November 7, 1986 (age 39); Athens, Greece
- Other name: Doukissa Nomikou Theodoridi
- Height: 1.74 m (5 ft 9 in)
- Title: Miss Star Hellas 2007
- Spouse: Dimitris Theodoridis (m. 2017)
- Children: Savvas Theodoridis; Anastasia Theodoridi
- Parent(s): Nikos Nomikos; Anastasia Nomikou
- Relatives: Nikitas Nomikos (brother)
- Website: www.dutchesssdaily.com

Doukissa Nomikou (Greek: Δούκισσα Νομικού: born November 7, 1986) is a Greek TV host, model and beauty pageant titleholder. She was crowned Star Hellas 2007 and represented her country at the Miss Universe 2007 pageant in Mexico.

From 2012 to 2017, she was the co-presenter of the TV show OLA next to Themos Anastasiadis. Also, she presented the Greek versions of shows Dancing with the Stars and So You Think You Can Dance.

Since 2017, is the ambassador of L'Oreal Paris. In September 2018, she participated in Paris Fashion Week for the Le Défilé Fashion Show of L'Oreal Paris with Doutzen Kroes and Eva Longoria. Since 2018, is also ambassador of organization Mazi Gia To Paidi, which helps poor kids and their families.

== Early life ==
Nomikou was born on November 7, 1986, in Athens to singer Nikos Nomikos and housewife Anastasia Nomikou (née Piperopoulou). Her mother is German-Greek and her father is Greek from Schinousa island. She has an older brother, Nikitas (b. 1985). After school, Nomikou studied at Economical University of Athens and graduated in 2014. Along with her studies, began her modeling career with Cristy Crana's agency.

== Career ==
=== Television ===
On May 3, 2007, Nomikou participated in ANT1's beauty pageant and she crowned Miss Star Hellas. After that, she represented Greece in Miss Universe beauty pageant in Mexico.
In 2008, Nomikou did her debut as TV presenter, with TV show LifeStyle on Alter Channel, where she was co-presenter of Nikos Papadakis. The next season she was a cast member of Omorfos kosmos to proi as co-presenter of Grigoris Arnaoutoglou with Katerina Kainourgiou, Dimitris Ouggarezos and Maria Arabatzi. In 2009, she did a guest appearance on the series I Polykatoikia and was the ambassador of Veet creams. In 2010–2011 Nomikou was the presenter of green room on talent show Just The 2 Of Us, where the main presenter was Giorgos Kapoutzidis. In October 2011, she began to present again the TV show LifeStyle but the project ended because of the channel's economic problems.

In 2012, Nomikou went to channel ANT1 and she began to present the TV show Laugh Attack with Panagiotis Chatzidakis. From 2012 to 2017 she was the co-presenter of the TV show Laugh Attack next to Themos Anastasiadis and Vaggelis Perris. In 2014 worked with company Johnson's Radiant Essentials for its commercials. From 2013 to 2015, she presented the Greek version of Dancing with the Stars. From autumn 2015 to winter 2016, she presented the TV show Joy but stopped because problems with the production. After that, in spring 2017, Nomikou presented the Greek version of talent show So You Think You Can Dance. The judges were Eleni Foureira, Ioannis Melissanidis, Konstantinos Rigos and Panos Metaxopoulos.

Since 2021, she hosts the show Super Makeover on Skai TV. In the show includes also four experts, make up expert Pantelis Toutountzis, fashion stylist expert Elena Papastavrou, hair stylist expert Sofia Nomikou and the counseling psychologist expert Maria Houdalaki. In 2021, on the same channel, Nomikou hosted only the live shows of the seventh season of the show The Voice of Greece, where the host of the show Giorgos Lianos, could not present the show, because he was absent in the Dominican Republic, where he was presenting the eighth season of the show Survivor Greece.

=== Theatre and Cinema ===
Her theatre debut as an actress was in 2014, when she played the role of Beautiful Helen in theatrical play Troikos Polemos (Trojan War) with Andinoos Albanis.

In cinema, Nomikou has appeared in two movies. I Limouzina (2014) and I Kori Tou Rebrant (2015).

== Personal life ==
From 2008 to 2010, Nomikou had been in a relationship with Greek singer Nino.

In 2014, Nomikou began dating entrepreneur Dimitris Theodoridis, who is Savvas Theodoridis's son. The couple was married on June 10, 2017 in Mykonos island and after that, Nomikou changed her name on Instagram to Doukissa Nomikou Theodoridi. On March 25, 2018, Nomikou gave birth to their first child, a son, Savvas Theodoridis and on September 26, 2019, gave birth to their second child, a daughter, Anastasia Theodoridi.

Nomikou's sister-in-law is Serbian-Greek model and entrepreneur Anna Prelevic.

== Filmography ==
=== Television ===
Year	Title	Role(s)	Notes	Ref.
2007	National Beauty Pageant of Greece	Herself (contestant)	Winner (Star Hellas '07)	
2007	Miss Universe 2007	Herself (contestant)	TV special	
2008	One Moment Two Lives	Herself	3 episodes	
2008–2009	LifeStyle	Herself (host)	Saturday talk show; season 6	
2009–2010	Beautiful World in the Morning	Herself (host)	Daytime talk show; season 7	
2010	Talk Dirty to Me	Herself	Episode: "Inauguration"	
2010	The Block of Flats	Herself	Episode: "It was once a tv-spot"	
2010	Life&Style Awards - Women of the Year	Herself (host)	TV special	
2010–2011	Just the 2 of Us	Herself (host)	Season 1	
2011	Madame Figaro Awards - Women of the Year	Herself (host)	TV special	
2011-2012	LifeStyle	Herself (host)	Saturday talk show; season 9	
2012	Laugh Attack	Herself (host)	Talk show	
2012–2017	Everything	Herself (co-host)	Late nigh talk show on ANT1; season 14-18	
2013	MadWalk - The Fashion Music Project	Herself (performance)	TV special	
2013–2015	Dancing with the Stars	Herself (host)	Season 4-5	
2014	MadWalk – The Fashion Music Project	Herself (performance)	TV special	
2015–2016	Joy: The Dutchesss Edition	Herself (host)	Weekend talk show; season 4	
2017	So You Think You Can Dance	Herself (host)	Season 3	
2021	The Voice of Greece	Herself (host)	Live shows; season 7	
2021	Super Makeover	Herself (host)	Daytime makeover show	
2021	MadWalk - The Fashion Music Project	Herself (host)	TV special	
2022	To Proino	Herself (host)	Daytime talk show on ANT1; season 10	

=== Film ===
Year	Title	Role	Notes	Ref.
2013	The Limousine: A Comedy of Misunderstandings	Collete	Film debut	
2015	The Daughter of Rembrandt			

== Stage ==
=== Theater ===
Production	Year	Theater	Role
Trojan War	2014-2015	Pallas Theater	Beautiful Helen
