= Alexandra Sieti =

Greek Singer

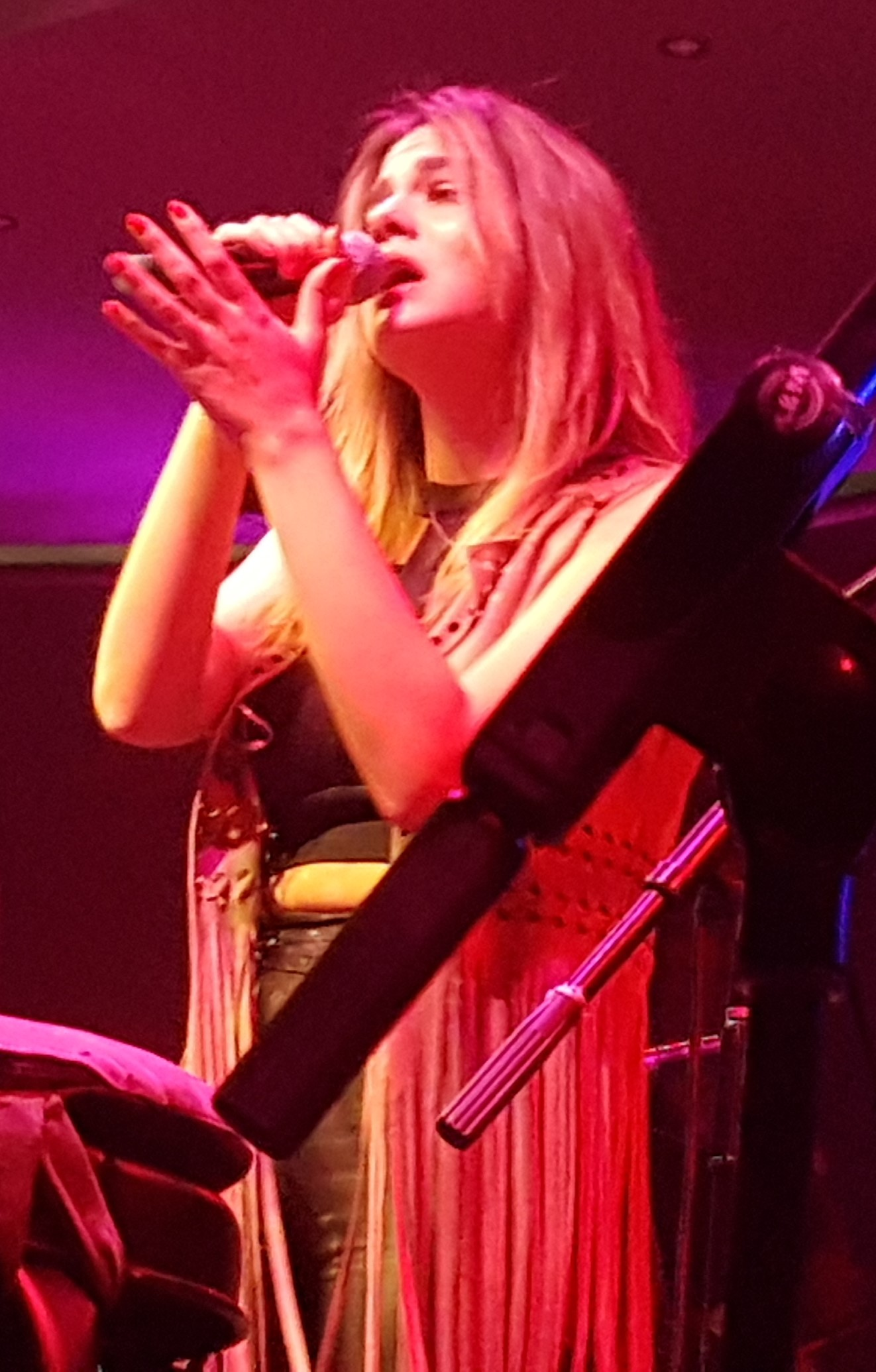

Background information
- Born: Alexandra Sieti; Thessaloniki, Greece
- Origin: Greece
- Genres: Funk, Soul, RnB
- Occupation: Singer
- Instrument: Vocals
- Years active: 2018–present
- Label: Cobalt Music

Alexandra Sieti is a Thessaloniki-born Greek singer.

== Education ==
Sieti graduated from the Music College of Thessaloniki, where she studied music theory, choral singing and piano.

In 2013, she studied English literature, jazz singing and music theory at the Contemporary Conservatory of Thessaloniki.

From 2014 to 2016, Sieti studied jazz music in the Jazz Masterclasses at the New Bulgarian University of Sofia, where she worked alongside artists including Billy Cobham, Milcho Leviev and David Murray.

== Career ==
In 2018, she joined the band Souled Out. She recorded multiple tracks as the frontwoman of Souled Out.

In 2019, Sieti collaborated with Dionysis Savvopoulos in a performance. The following year, she participated in The Voice of Greece season 7 in 2021, where she placed second.

In 2022, she performed tribute shows to Ray Charles and signed a contract with Cobalt Music. In the same year, she also opened at a Beth Hart concert in Athens.

In 2024, she released her debut single, titled "She's a Lover". To promote "She's a Lover", a holographic image of her was displayed in a Greek train station. Later that year, she released her second single "WINTER". The music video for "WINTER" was directed by Lilina Marinou.

In 2025, she released a single titled "Bad News". In the same year, she took part in a New Year's event organised by SNFCC, where she and a seven-piece band performed covers.

In 2026, Sieti participated in that year's edition of Sing for Greece with her track "The Other Side". She placed 8th in the Grand Final. Following Sing For Greece 2026, Sieti performed at Kyttaros alongside Ian Stratis, Traiana Anania and Alexis Nicolas. In June of that year, she performed alongside Cuban singer Rosanna Mailan as guest performers at Jerome Kalouta's show.

== Artistry ==
Sieti has said she performs R&B, funk, blues, soul and rock. She has named Beth Hart as an influence on her music.

== Discography ==
=== Singles ===
- "She's a Lover" (2024)
- "WINTER" (2024)
- "Bad News" (2025)
- "The Other Side" (2026)
