= Mikay (singer) =

Greek singer

- Origin: Armenia, Italy
- Occupation: Singer
- Instrument: Vocals
- Years active: 2022–present
- Label: Minos EMI

Mikay is a Greek singer of Armenian and Italian heritage.

== Background ==
Throughout her childhood, Mikay lived in Italy and Rhodes. She learned how to play the clarinet at age 10 and played clarinet in a Philharmonic choir. She grew up in multilingual environments, and was exposed to languages like French, Armenian, Italian and Greek.

== Career ==
Mikay started by creating covers of tracks on social media in multiple languages, including Nemo's Eurovision winning track "The Code", which was praised by Nemo themselves.

In 2019, Mikay received an offer to perform in China. She stayed in China for three years. She toured across Eastern Asia during this time.

In 2022, she made her debut by releasing "Don't Wake Me Up". The following year, she released "All The Stars".

In 2024, she signed with Minos EMI. With Minos EMI, she released "Blah Blah Blah".

The following year, she wrote the theme song for the Sanxingdui-Jinsha global promotion for International Museum Day "A Thousand Years Later". The song was a collaboration between Mikay, Chinese singer Faye Yuan and Greek singer SOTI, and was supported by Greek and Chinese embassies. She also released her single "San Kapnos" in this year.

In 2026, Mikay took part in the 2026 Greek national selection Sing for Greece with track "Labyrinth". She qualified to the final, where she placed 10th with a total of 8 points. Following her participation in the contest, she released her track "Pagoto".

== Artistry ==
Mikay has named East Asian, particularly Chinese, culture as an influence in her lifestyle and music. She has a three and a half octave vocal range. She has also named Celine Dion as a musical inspiration.

== Discography ==
=== Singles ===
- "Don't Wake Me Up"(2022)
- "All The Stars" (2023)
- "Blah Blah Blah" (2024)
- "San Kapnos" (2025)
- "Labyrinth" (2026)
- "Pagoto" (2026)
