= Panagiotis Tsakalakos =

Panagiotis Tsakalakos Παναγιώτης Τσακαλάκος
- Born: December 16, 1978 (age 47); New Jersey, United States
- Origin: Athens, Greece
- Genres: Rock; Pop
- Occupations: Singer; Songwriter
- Years active: 2007–present

Panagiotis Tsakalakos (Greek: Παναγιώτης Τσακαλάκος; born December 16, 1978, in New Jersey, United States), is an American-born Greek singer and guitarist. He rose to prominence after winning the second series of Greek Idol. In the final held on June 25, 2011, he won with 53.8% of the public votes against rival finalist Malou Kiriakopoulou. Soon after his win, he released his debut single "Poly Mou Paei".

Panagiotis Tsakalakos parents went to the U.S. in the early 1970s where his father did graduate work at Northwestern. He holds both a bachelor's and master's degree in Music.

On January 4, 2026 he was announced as one of the candidates for representing Greece in the Eurovision Song Contest 2026, He failed to qualify for the final.

== Discography ==
=== Albums ===
- 2012: Tha Me Vreis (Θα Με Βρείς)

=== Singles ===
- 2008: "I Just Can't Figure Out"
- 2011: "Poly Mou Paei" (Πολύ Μου Πάει)
- 2011: "Acharisto Paidi" (Αχάριστο Παιδί)
- 2012: "Tha Me Vreis" (Θα Με Βρείς)
- 2018: "Xekinaei" (Ξεκινάει)
