= Marseaux =

Greek singer

- Marseaux performing at the Thessaloniki International Fair 2026

Background information
- Born: Maria-Sofia; March 9, 2001 (age 25); Athens, Greece
- Origin: Greece
- Genres: Pop, contemporary rap
- Occupations: Singer; actress
- Instrument: Vocals
- Years active: 2017-present

Maria-Sofia Mounti (in greek: Μαρία Σοφία Μουντη) (born March 9, 2001) known professionally as Marseaux, is a Greek singer-songwriter and actress.

== Background ==
Marseaux was born and raised in Athens, where she performed in the shows Annie and Billy Elliot. Her mother died when she was seventeen. Marseaux attended an art school in the drama department, and studied French and English. She has learnt how to dance tango.

== Career ==
Marseaux started her musical career in 2017 by collaborating with Solmeister and joining the Wednesday Night Cypher (WNC) collective. In 2019 she released her debut album "Kore".

She released her second album "Chica" in 2021. Her song "Vodka Vissini" (on "Chica") received platinum streaming status. Marseaux has cited "Chica" as an album about being 20.

In 2023, Marseaux went on tour with the WNC collective, including Solmeister. In the same year, she released her third album "Witch". She has collaborated with artists like Evangelia and SNIK, and served as the Greek ambassador of Spotify's global EQUAL campaign, where an image of her was displayed at Times Square. In 2025, she began to act the leading role of Wednesday Addams in the Vembo Theatre's production of The Addams Family. Marseaux performed alongside actors including Nikos Moutsinas and Maria Solomou.

In 2026, Marseaux was announced in the lineup of Sing For Greece, the Greek selection for the Eurovision Song Contest 2026, with the song "Hanomai" (I'm Lost). She qualified from Semi Final 1 to the final, where she placed 3rd, finishing second with the Greek jury, third with the international jury and fourth with the public vote.

== Style and Influences ==
Marseaux performs contemporary pop and rap genres. She cites Pavlo Pavlidis, Billie Eilish, Natasha Bofiliou, Lana Del Rey, The Weeknd, Solmeister, Queen, Sasske and the Wednesday Night Cypher as influences for her music. She has also stated her music is experimental.

== Discography ==
=== Albums ===
- Kori (2019)
- Chica (2021)
- Witch (2023)

=== Singles ===
- "Hanomai" (2026)
- "Granita Lemoni" (2026)
