= Akylas =

Greek singer (born 1999)

Akylas Ακύλας
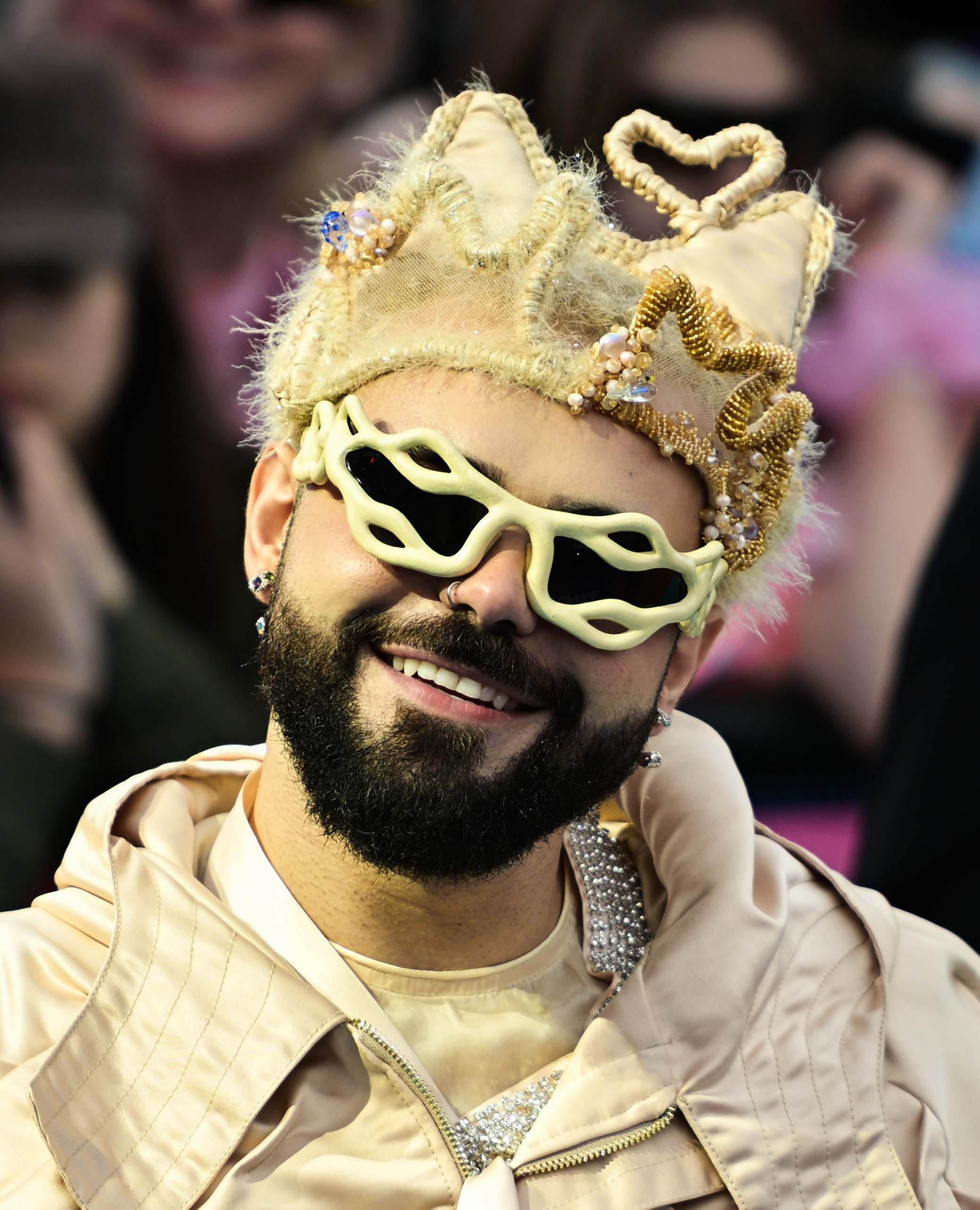
- Akylas in 2026

Background information
- Born: Akýlas Mytilinéos; 11 February 1999 (age 27); Serres, Greece
- Occupations: Singer; songwriter
- Instruments: Vocals; ukulele
- Years active: 2015–present

Akylas Mytilineos (Greek: Ακύλας Μυτιληναίος; (Note: Greek pronunciation: [aˈcilas mitiliˈne.os]) born 11 February 1999), also known mononymously as Akylas, is a Greek singer and songwriter. He represented Greece in the Eurovision Song Contest 2026 with the song "Ferto" and he finished in 10th place with 220 points.

== Early life ==
Akylas Mytilineos was born on 11 February 1999 in Serres, where he grew up. He is of Pontic Greek ancestry and his parents grew up in Georgia. He has been passionate about music since his childhood and studied at The Serres Music School and also took theatre classes.

After completing his secondary education at the 1st High School of Serres, he moved to Thessaloniki, where he graduated from a culinary school and worked in restaurants. He also worked for two years as a singer on cruise ships of the Aida Cruises company. He has commented that, "I graduated from a music high school, and I’ve done plenty of theater workshops and things like that, but I hadn’t really focused on vocal training or anything like that. On the cruise ship where I worked for two years, I sang every day—disco, pop, rock. So it was like a masterclass. I was there for two and a half months, then I’d go home for two months... ...So it was a good training ground to get ready for the Eurovision stage,...". After the two years he spent singing on cruise ships, Akylas then moved to Athens.

== Career ==
It was in 2021 that Akylas first major contact with the Greek public began thanks to his cover videos published on TikTok in which he accompanies himself on the ukulele. He taught himself to play the ukulele by watching YouTube tutorials whilst he was at home during the quarantine for the COVID pandemic. In 2021 he also released his first single, Cheap Wine, Φθηνόκρασο (Fthinókraso), the first song he ever wrote, which discusses life in Athens, the difficulties and dreams.

In 2021, he participated in the eighth season of The Voice of Greece, where he joined Panos Mouzourakis's team.

On 4 January 2026 during the show Sing for Greece – Ethnikós Telikós Eurovision 2026 – I finalist, broadcast on ERT1, it was announced that Akylas would compete in the Greek national final for the Eurovision Song Contest 2026, dubbed Sing for Greece 2026, with the song Ferto. After advancing from the first semi-final, he won in the final on 15 February 2026, thus earning the right to represent Greece at the Eurovision Song Contest 2026 in Vienna, Austria, where he managed to finish in the 10th place with 220 points.

== Personal life ==
Akylas is openly queer.

== Discography ==
=== Studio albums ===
Title	Details	Peak chart positions
Title	Details	GRE
Press Start	Released: 21 May 2026; Label: Minos EMI; Formats: CD, digital download, streaming	13

=== Singles ===
Title	Year	Peak chart positions	Certifications	Album or EP
Title	Year	GRE Local	Certifications	Album or EP
"Fthinokraso"	2021	—		Non-album singles
"To plithos (La Foule)"	2021	—		Non-album singles
"Didymes floges"	2022	—		Non-album singles
"To avrio"	2022	—		Non-album singles
"Ela konta"	2022	—		Non-album singles
"Ma ego"	2023	—		Non-album singles
"Ekdilosou"	2023	—		Non-album singles
"Arga"	2023	—		Non-album singles
"Atelié"	2023	—		Non-album singles
"Taseis fygis"	2024	—		Non-album singles
"Ekdilosou"	2024	—		Non-album singles
"Ferto"	2026	8	IFPI GRE: Gold	Press Start
"To Party"	2026	—		Non-album single
"—" denotes a recording that did not chart or was not released in that territory.

=== Other charted songs ===
Title	Year	Peak chart positions	Album or EP
Title	Year	GRE Local	Album or EP
"Parto"	2026	28	Press Start
"SpastoSpasto"	2026	54	Press Start

=== Other collaborations ===
Title	Year	Album or EP
"Gia sena" (Exhale featuring Akylas)	2024	Panta Neoi

== Notes ==
Awards and achievements
Preceded by Klavdia with "Asteromata"	Greece in the Eurovision Song Contest; 2026	Succeeded by TBA
