= Evangelia (singer) =

Greek singer (born 1992)

Evangelia Ευαγγελία
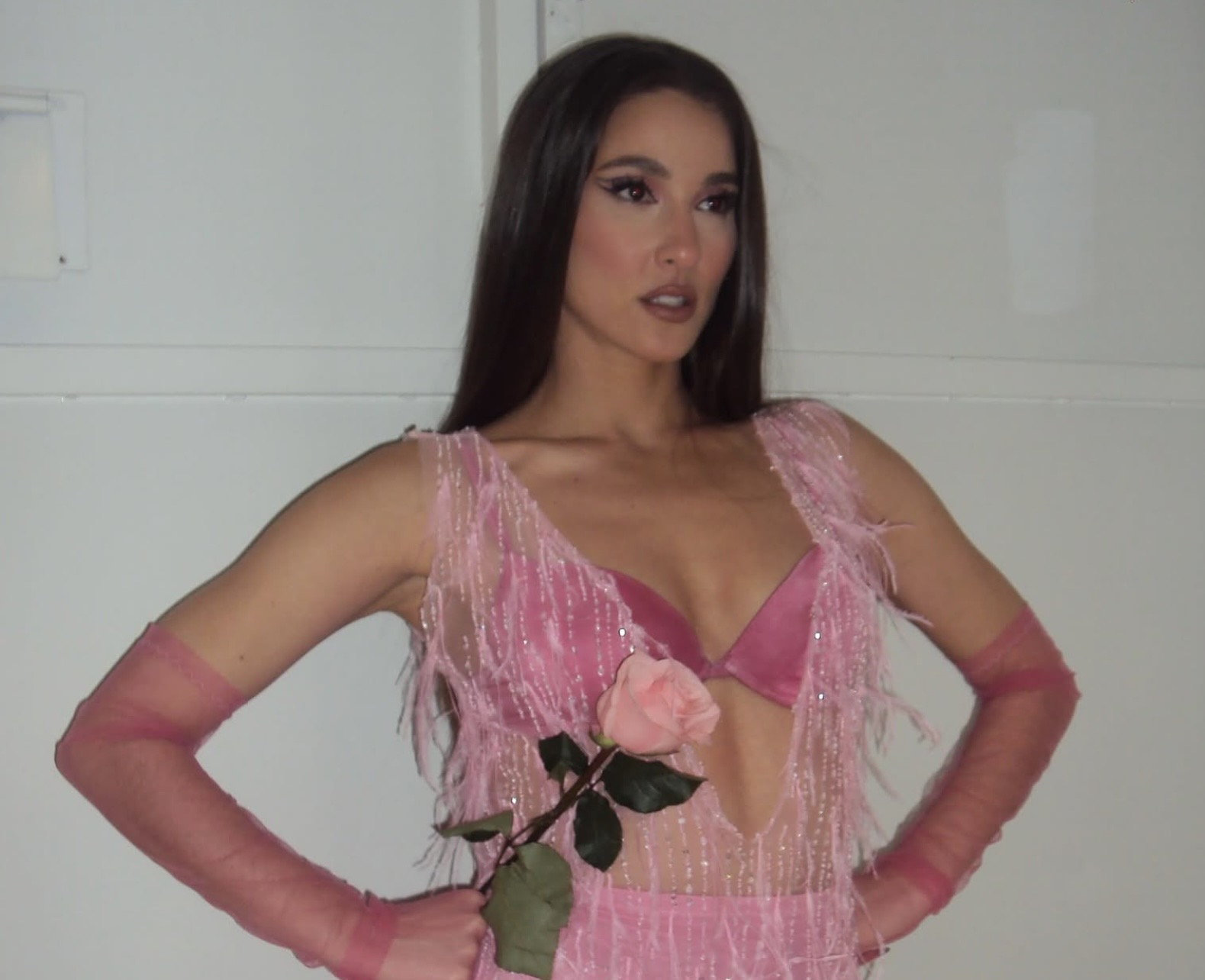
- Evangelia in 2026

Background information
- Born: Evangelia Psarakis; 24 May 1992 (age 34); Bridgewater, New Jersey, U.S.
- Genre: Pop
- Occupation: Singer
- Instrument: Vocals
- Years active: 2020–present
- Label: Minos EMI

Evangelia Psarakis (Greek: Ευαγγελία Ψαράκη; born 24 May 1992), known mononymously as Evangelia, is a Greek singer. Raised between New Jersey and Crete, she is known for combining contemporary pop with elements of traditional Greek music and incorporating both Greek and English lyrics into her work.

She made her recording debut in 2020 with "Páme Páme" and gained wider recognition through the commercially successful singles "Fotiá", "Páli", "Vradia" and "Alitheia?!". "Vradia" reached number one in Greece and became the first diamond-certified single of her career. Her debut studio album, Peproméno, was released in 2025.

In 2025, Evangelia became the first Greek artist selected as a Global Ambassador for Spotify's EQUAL initiative. The following year, she launched the Paréa project, inspired by the Greek concept of paréa and classic Greek cinema.

== Early life and education ==
Evangelia grew up between her grandmother's small farm on the island of Crete and her parents' house in New Jersey. She studied history and political science at Rutgers University from 2010 and completed a teacher training course at the Rutgers Graduate School of Education in New Brunswick in 2015. While she was still a student, she performed as a singer in clubs in New York City. After her training, Evangelia worked as a teacher, but after three years decided to give up her job to devote herself entirely to her music career.

== Musical career ==
=== 2020–2022: Career beginnings and "Fotiá" ===
Evangelia made her recording debut in 2020 with the single "Páme Páme". Her early releases established a musical style combining contemporary pop production with Greek melodies and traditional influences, frequently incorporating both Greek and English lyrics.

She gained wider recognition with "Fotiá", which was subsequently released in a version with Greek singer Eleni Foureira. The song became one of Evangelia's first major commercial successes in Greece and was certified double platinum.

=== 2023–2024: Alpha/Beta and commercial breakthrough ===
In 2023, Evangelia released "Páli" with Mente Fuerte. The song was certified platinum in Greece.

In May 2024, she released her first extended play, Alpha/Beta. The six-track project presented Greek- and English-language versions of "Fotiá", "Páli" and "Ónira". The concept reflected the two sides of Evangelia's Greek-American identity and her experience moving between the two languages and cultures.

Her commercial breakthrough continued later that year with "Vradia", with Roi 6/12. The single reached number one in Greece and was subsequently certified diamond, becoming the first diamond-certified single of her career.

Later in 2024, Evangelia released "Alitheia?!" with Marseaux. The single was certified platinum in Greece.

=== 2025: "Vále" and Peproméno ===
Evangelia released "Vále" in January 2025. The bilingual Greek-English song combined contemporary pop with elements of traditional Greek music. She performed the song in Greece's national selection for the Eurovision Song Contest, where it received the highest score from the international jury, earning 12 points.

Later that year, Evangelia announced her debut studio album, Peproméno, during her performance at Cyprus Pride, where she revealed its cover artwork and release date.

Peproméno was released on 13 June 2025. Its title translates to "destiny", and the album explores Evangelia's experience of growing up between Greek and American cultures.

The album was partly inspired by Erotokritos, the 17th-century Cretan romance by Vitsentzos Kornaros, particularly the love story between Erotokritos and Aretousa. The story's themes of love, separation and perseverance informed the album's exploration of destiny and personal experience. The connection is introduced through the album's opening track, "Aretoúsa (Intro)", while Cretan musical and cultural references recur throughout the record.

An expanded 17-track edition, Peproméno (Deluxe), was released on 31 July 2025, adding "Diamond Baby", "Alitheia?!", "Vradia" and "Only You". The tracks included on the deluxe edition have collectively accumulated more than 30 million streams on Spotify.

In October 2025, Peproméno entered the first-round voting process for the 68th Annual Grammy Awards in the categories of Best Global Music Album and Best Album Cover, the latter of which was introduced for the first time at the 2026 ceremony.

=== 2026–present: Paréa ===
In early 2026, Evangelia returned to Greece's national selection for the Eurovision Song Contest with "Paréa". She finished fourth overall and placed second with the international jury.

Following the national final, Evangelia released "Paréa", launching the broader Paréa era. The project takes its name from the Greek word παρέα (paréa), referring to a close group of friends or companions and the experience of gathering and spending time together. Its visual identity draws inspiration from classic Greek cinema.

The project subsequently expanded internationally with Paréa: The Prelude, released on 30 April 2026. The EP featured multilingual reinterpretations of "Paréa" with female artists from different countries, including Lena Zevgara, Miriana Conte and KIKI, and Dara Ekimova.

The Bulgarian version with Ekimova achieved major commercial success in Bulgaria, peaking at number three on the country's official PROPHON airplay chart and spending at least 12 consecutive weeks within the top five.

Evangelia continued the Paréa project in June 2026 with "Éna Neró", a contemporary reworking of the traditional Greek song "Ένα Νερό Κυρά Βαγγελιώ". The single was accompanied by a cinematic short film, shot entirely in Los Angeles.

Paréa also formed the basis of The Paréa Tour, Evangelia's 2026 international headline tour, with dates across North America and Europe.

== Artistry ==
Evangelia's music is primarily pop and incorporates elements of Greek traditional and folk music into contemporary production. Her songs frequently incorporate both Greek and English lyrics.

Her upbringing between New Jersey and Crete has been a recurring influence on her work. Her music has explored the relationship between her Greek and American backgrounds through language and musical traditions.

This duality was made explicit on Alpha/Beta, which presented the same material in Greek and English. Peproméno expanded on her connection to Greece and particularly Crete, drawing from Cretan music, literature and cultural traditions, including the story of Erotokritos and Aretousa.

The subsequent Paréa era drew from the Greek concept of paréa, while its visual identity incorporated influences from classic Greek cinema.

== Public image ==
Evangelia's public image has become closely associated with her Greek and Cretan heritage, particularly through her use of traditional Greek dance. Pentozali, a traditional Cretan dance, has been a recurring feature of her performances and social media presence. During her 2023 Australian tour, she attracted media attention after performing Pentozali in central Melbourne as part of a series of videos featuring her performing the dance in cities around the world.

The association has also been reflected by Greek diaspora communities and traditional dance groups. In January 2025, following Evangelia's appearance on Spotify's EQUAL billboard in Times Square, members of the Idomeneas Cretan Youth association of Astoria gathered beneath the billboard in traditional Cretan dress and performed Pentozali to her song "Vále". Greek media described Pentozali as a signature element of Evangelia's public image. The following month, during an appearance on Breakfast@Star, members of the Chania dance group O Psiloritis surprised Evangelia with a Pentozali performance dedicated to her. The performance received coverage in Greek media and prompted an emotional reaction from Evangelia.

Traditional Greek dance continued to feature in the visual presentation of Paréa in 2026. The music video for "Paréa" incorporated traditional Greek dancers and sirtaki choreography alongside imagery inspired by Greek cinema. In March 2026, London-based Greek dance group Spasta joined Evangelia for a public performance of sirtaki to "Paréa" in Syntagma Square in Athens. British-Greek newspaper Parikiaki described the performance as a continuation of Evangelia's "viral trend" of dancing sirtaki to the song and reported that locals and tourists stopped to watch, with some joining the dance.

== Spotify Equal ==
In 2025, Evangelia became the first Greek artist selected as a Global Ambassador for Spotify's EQUAL initiative, the streaming platform's international program supporting women in music. Previous EQUAL Global Ambassadors have included artists such as Billie Eilish, Shakira, Karol G, Sabrina Carpenter and Tate McRae.

As part of the campaign, she appeared on the cover of both the EQUAL Greece and global EQUAL playlists and was featured on an EQUAL billboard in Times Square, New York City.

Her Times Square appearance was accompanied by ten Cretan dancers performing the traditional Pentozali.

== Touring and live performances ==
Evangelia has performed internationally across Europe, North America and Australia and has toured internationally alongside Greek singer Konstantinos Argiros.

In 2024, she embarked on the Feels Like Greek Summer Tour across North America. Promoted by Live Nation, it made Evangelia the first Greek artist to headline a U.S. tour with Live Nation.

In 2026, Evangelia announced The Paréa Tour, an international headline tour associated with the Paréa project, with dates across North America and Europe.

== Personal life ==
Evangelia divides her time between Athens and Los Angeles. She has been in a relationship with American songwriter and producer Jay Stolar since 2018. Stolar has also been a frequent musical collaborator and producer of her work. Evangelia has discussed the overlap between their personal and professional relationship in interviews, describing their musical careers as something they have built together.

The couple became engaged in March 2025 after Stolar proposed at their home in Los Angeles using a song he had written for her. Evangelia publicly announced their engagement later that year.

== Discography ==
=== Studio albums ===
List of studio albums, with selected details
Title	Details	Peak position	Certifications
Title	Details	GRE	Certifications
Peproméno	Released: 13 June 2025; Label: Golden Records, Minos EMI; Formats: Digital download, streaming	—	—

=== Extended plays ===
List of EPs, with selected details
Title	Details	Peak position	Certifications
Title	Details	GRE	Certifications
Alpha/Beta	Released: 17 May 2024; Label: Columbia, Epic Records; Formats: Digital download, streaming	—	—

=== Singles ===
Song Chart Performance and Certifications
Title	Year	Charts		Certifications	Album
Title	Year	GRE	BUL Dom. Air.	Certifications	Album
Páme Páme	2020	—	X		
Fotiá	2020	—	X		Alpha/Beta
Diving (with Kelvin Jones)	2021	—	X		
Fotiá (with Eleni Foureira)	2021	14	X	• IFPI GRE: 2x Platinum	Alpha/Beta
Perder Control (with Eleni Foureira)	2022	—	X		
Ónira	2022	—	X		Alpha/Beta
Paradise	2022	—	X		
Aman (with Amanda Tenfjord)	2022	—	X		
Miss You (with Disarstar & The Cratez)	2022	—	X		
Aphrodite	2022	—	X		
Páli (with Mente Fuerte)	2023	—	X	• IFPI GRE: Platinum	Alpha/Beta
Let's Go MIA	2023	—	X		
Toca Toca (with Claydee)	2023	—	X		
M'Aresei (with Negros Tou Moria)	2023	—	X		
Videotape (with Good Job Nicky)	2023	—	X		
California Lullaby	2024	—	X		
Xana (with DJ Paco)	2024	—	X		
Vradia (with Roi 6/12)	2024	1	X	• IFPI GRE: 3xPlatinum	
Mykonos	2024	—	X		
Alitheia?! (with Marseaux)	2024	14	X	• IFPI GRE: Platinum	
Vále	2025	42	X		Peproméno
Panáthemáse	2025	—	X		Peproméno
Tourísta	2025	—	X		Peproméno
Parèa	2026	—	3		

== Awards and nominations ==
Year	Award	Category	Nominee(s)	Result	Ref.
2023	MAD Video Music Awards	Best New Artist	Herself	Nominated	
2023	MAD Video Music Awards	Best Duet	Fotiá	Nominated	
2025	MAD Video Music Awards	Best Duet	Alitheia?!	Nominated	
2025	MAD Video Music Awards	Best Dance	Alitheia?!	Nominated	
2025	MAD Video Music Awards	Best Urban	Vradia	Nominated	
