= Peiraios 260 (venue) =

Theatre venue in Athens, Greece

The Peiraios 260 (Greek: Πειραιώς 260) is a venue in Athens, Greece and one of the main stages of Athens Epidaurus Festival.

== Description ==
It is located at 260 Peiraios Street, in Tavros, Athens, close to the Athens School of Fine Arts. The site used to house the ''Tsaousoglou'' furniture factory. Designed in the 1970s, the complex is a typical example of the industrial architecture of that period. It consists of large buildings and sheds that have been classified by the Ministry of Culture and Sports as historical monuments for their architecture.

It used to house an office furniture factory, which closed down and became the property of the National Bank of Greece. In 2006, part of the site was transferred to the Athens Epidaurus Festival, following an agreement with the National Bank of Greece by the festival's artistic director, Giorgos Loukos.

In the period that followed, the festival created four new theatre stages in the space. Loukos' ultimate goal was to open the festival to the public by using other alternative venues in addition to the Herodes Atticus Conservatory, the Ancient Theatre of Epidaurus and the Little Theatre of Epidaurus.

In the early 2010s, the possible concession of part of the ownership of the site, with the ultimate purpose of housing services, to the Greek Ministry of Culture and Sports was discussed, a relocation process that is expected to be completed during 2025.
