= Greece in the Eurovision Song Contest =

- Eurovision Song Contest
- Participating broadcaster: Elliniki Radiofonia Tileorasi (ERT) Formerly: Ethniko Idryma Radiofonias Tileoraseos (EIRT; 1974); Nea Elliniki Radiofonia, Internet kai Tileorasi (NERIT; 2014–2015)

Participation summary
- Appearances: 46 (43 finals)
- First appearance: 1974
- Highest placement: 1st: 2005
- Host: 2006
- Participation history: 1974; 1975; 1976; 1977; 1978; 1979; 1980; 1981; ~~1982~~; 1983; 1984; 1985; ~~1986~~; 1987; 1988; 1989; 1990; 1991; 1992; 1993; 1994; 1995; 1996; 1997; 1998; 1999; 2000; 2001; 2002; 2003; 2004; 2005; 2006; 2007; 2008; 2009; 2010; 2011; 2012; 2013; 2014; 2015; 2016; 2017; 2018; 2019; ~~2020~~; 2021; 2022; 2023; 2024; 2025; 2026

Related articles
- Sing for Greece

External links
- ERT page
- Greece's page at Eurovision.com
- For the most recent participation see Greece in the Eurovision Song Contest 2026

Greece has been represented at the Eurovision Song Contest 46 times since its debut in 1974, missing six contests in that time (1975, 1982, 1984, 1986, 1999, and 2000). The country won for the first and to date only time in 2005 with "My Number One" by Helena Paparizou. The Greek participating broadcaster in the contest is Elliniki Radiofonia Tileorasi (ERT). Greece has never finished last in the contest.

Throughout the 20th century, Greece achieved only two top five results, finishing fifth with "Mathema solfege" by Paschalis, Marianna, Robert, and Bessy in 1977 and again fifth with "Olou tou kosmou i elpida" by Cleopatra in 1992. The start of the 21st century saw Greece become one of the most successful countries in the contest, with ten out of thirteen top-ten results between 2001 and 2013, including third-place finishes for "Die for You" by Antique in 2001 (with 2005 winner Paparizou as lead singer), "Shake It" by Sakis Rouvas in 2004, and "Secret Combination" by Kalomira in 2008. Between 2014 and 2019, Greece has had less success, including two non-qualifications to the final (2016 and 2018), however revamped its position in the 2020s by placing in the top ten four times (2021, 2022, 2025, and 2026).

== Participation ==
Elliniki Radiofonia Tileorasi (ERT) is a full member of the European Broadcasting Union (EBU), thus eligible to participate in the Eurovision Song Contest representing Greece. Of all the Greek entries in the contest, only three were not from ERT. The country's debut in the contest in its 19th edition in 1974 was by ERT's predecessor Ethniko Idryma Radiofonias Tileoraseos (EIRT), and the Greek participation in the 2014 and 2015 contest was by ERT's replacement during its closure Nea Elliniki Radiofonia, Internet kai Tileorasi (NERIT).

Before Greece entered the contest, some Greek singers represented other countries. These singers were Jimmy Makulis (1961) for Austria, Yovanna (1965) for Switzerland, and Nana Mouskouri (1963) and Vicky Leandros (1967 and 1972) for Luxembourg.

== History ==
=== 1970s to 1990s ===
Marinella (pictured in 2006) was the first representative for Greece at their contest debut in 1974.

In 1974, during the Greek military junta, rock band Nostradamos won the first Eurovision participation contest ran by the state broadcaster EIRT to represent Greece at Eurovision, after broadcasting it since 1970. However, due to a scandal, the band was not allowed to compete at Eurovision, and Greek laiko singer Marinella was sent instead. Greece did not participate in 1975 for "unknown reasons" according to the EBU, but it was later discovered that it was in protest of Turkey's debut and its invasion of Cyprus in 1974. On 3 December 1975, EIRT was replaced by ERT. Greece was represented in the 1976 Contest by Mariza Koch with the song "Panagia mou, Panagia mou". Greece's participation sparked controversy as it referred to the Turkish invasion of Cyprus. The organizers informed Koch that they were not responsible for her safety, as there were threats that armed Turks would be present at the venue and shoot her on stage. She signed a waiver stating that she would sing at her own risk. Three years after Greece's debut in the contest, the country achieved its first top-five result with the song "Mathima solfege" (Solfege Lesson) performed by Bessy, Paschalis, Marianna and Robert in 1977. The decade closed with Greece reaching eighth place twice in 1978 and 1979 with the songs "Charlie Chaplin" and "Socrati".

Greece was disqualified from the Eurovision Song Contest 1982 after it was revealed that Themis Adamantidis was to sing "Sarantapente kopelies", a previously released song. A known Greek folk song, it had been revised for the competition, but this violated the rules which stated that all songs had to be original in terms of songwriting and instrumentation and cannot be cover songs. Greece was forced to pay a fine and was allowed to return the following year. Had Adamantidis been allowed to perform, he would have appeared second at Harrogate. After returning in 1983, ERT stated that all of the possible songs were of "low quality" and decided not to participate in the 1984 contest.

Greece returned once more to the contest in 1985, and Polina was selected in the 1986 national selection to represent Greece at the 1986 contest in Bergen, Norway, but ERT pulled out of the contest unexpectedly. Polina stated that it was due to political troubles in Greece at the time, but she noted that a Eurovision website had learned that the real reason was that the contest was to be held the night before Orthodox Easter. Had she performed, she would have appeared eighteenth and she would have performed the song "Wagon-lit". Greece returned to the contest in 1987 with the band Bang reaching 10th place. Overall the country reached three times top-ten in the 80s, with the other two songs being "Feggari kalokerino" in 1981 and "To diko sou asteri" in 1989.

During the 1990s, Greece achieved two top-ten results with Cleopatra and Katy Garbi reaching fifth and ninth place in 1992 and 1993 respectively. The nation performed each year until the Eurovision Song Contest 1999, when it was relegated from participation. This was as its five-year points average had fallen under the limit for participation after Thalassa's 20th-place finish in 1998. The following year, ERT announced that it would not return at the Eurovision Song Contest 2000 (even though it was eligible to, having broadcast the 1999 contest on television) due to financial reasons.

=== 2000s ===
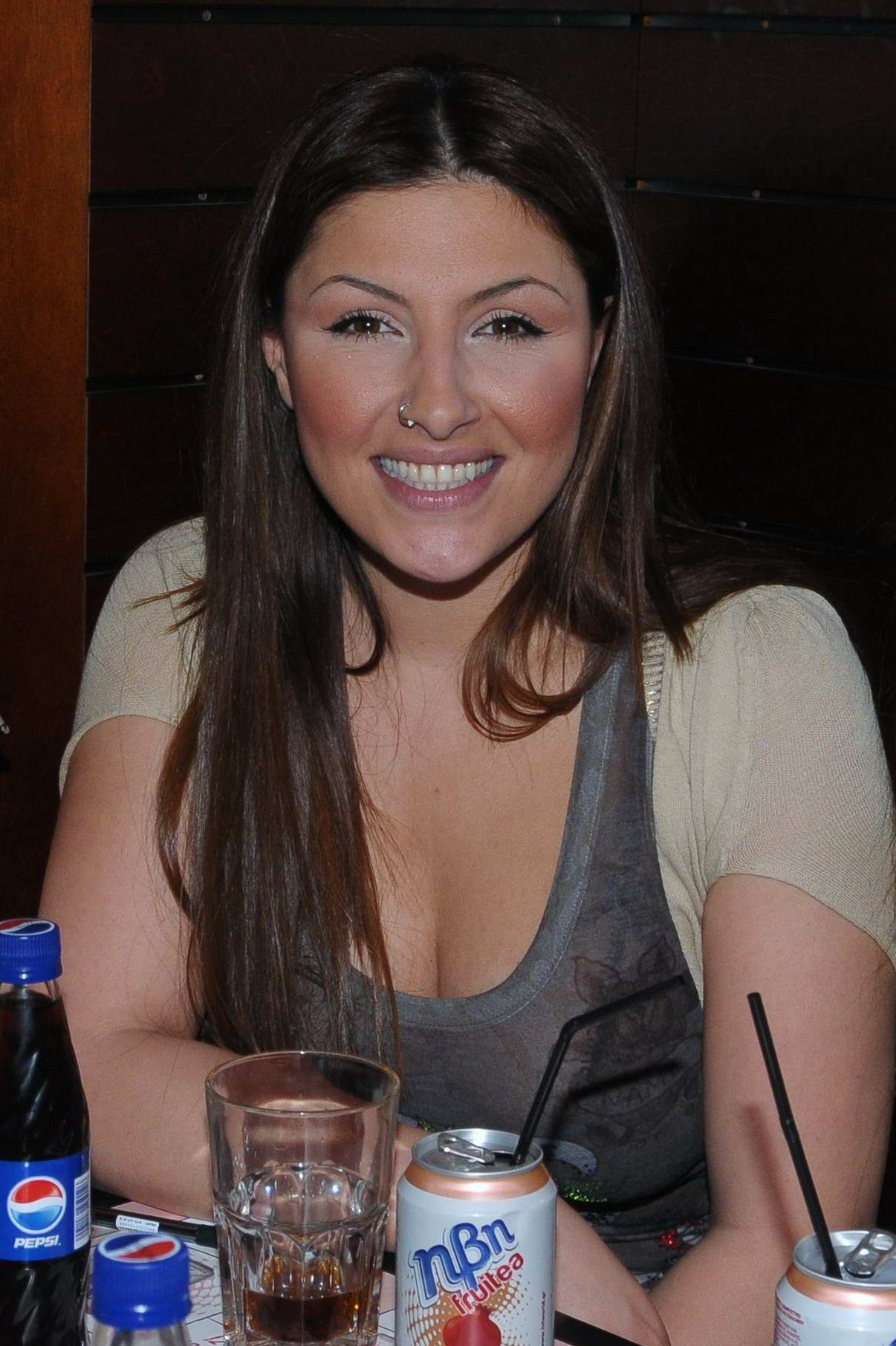
Helena Paparizou (pictured in 2010) represented Greece at the 2001 (as part of Antique) and 2005 contests, winning the latter.

Greece returned in 2001, and was represented by the Greek-Swedish duo Antique, consisting Helena Paparizou and Nikos Panagiotidis. Their song "Die for You" was selected through Ellinikós Telikós 2001 and placed third at the 2001 contest, a new record for highest placing for the nation. Following two 17th place entries in 2002 and 2003 by Michalis Rakintzis ("S.A.G.A.P.O.") and Mando ("Never Let You Go"), respectively, ERT internally selected Sakis Rouvas for 2004. Rouvas' song "Shake It" was the first to compete in a contest semi-final, which had been introduced to accommodate the growing number of participating nations. After qualifying to the final, the song tied what had been the nation's best performance at the time, placing third.

Thirty-one years after its debut, Greece won for the first time in 2005 with Helena Paparizou (appearing as a solo performer) singing "My Number One". The entry's 230 points tied the record for the most top twelve points allocated to a song (ten in total), matching Katrina and the Waves' 1997 song "Love Shine a Light". The victory made Greece the first country that was not a member of Big Four to win the contest without participating in a semi-final. After Eurovision, the song topped the charts in Greece, Cyprus as well as Sweden and entered the top ten in Romania, the Netherlands, Hungary, Belgium, as well as the American Billboard Hot Dance Club Play Chart. Later that year, contest organisers held a commemorative program, Congratulations: 50 Years of the Eurovision Song Contest, to celebrate 50 years of the contest. At the event, "My Number One" came fourth in a vote for the show's most popular entry, behind "Hold Me Now" (1987), "Nel blu, dipinto di blu" (1958) and ABBA's "Waterloo" (1974).

The nation's 2005 win earned Greece the opportunity to host the Eurovision Song Contest 2006. Rouvas and Greek American presenter Maria Menounos hosted the event, which was staged in Athens at the O.A.C.A. Olympic Indoor Hall. The singer representing Greece was 1980's Greek entrant Vissi, who achieved ninth place with the song "Everything". Until the end of the decade Greece achieved three more top-ten results, including seventh place by Sarbel with "Yassou Maria" in 2007 and third place by Kalomira with "Secret Combination" in 2008.

From 2004 to 2006, ERT had selected high-profile artists internally and set up national finals to choose the song, while in 2007 and 2008 it held a televised national final to choose both the song and performer. For the 2009 Eurovision Song Contest, ERT was able to secure a high-profile artist once again and planned a national final to choose the song. The song voted by the public was "This Is Our Night", another song performed by Sakis Rouvas, which eventually reached seventh place. Greece has been one of the most successful countries in the Eurovision Song Contest in the 21st century with 12 times finishing in the top-ten and 20 in total.

=== 2010s ===
At the 2010 contest, Greece finished eighth with the song "Opa", followed by a seventh place in 2011 with "Watch My Dance". After Eleftheria Eleftheriou placed 17th in 2012 with her song "Aphrodisiac", Greece achieved its 10th top-ten result of the century and 18th in total in 2013, finishing sixth with the song "Alcohol Is Free" by Koza Mostra and Agathonas Iakovidis. In 2014, Greece finished in 20th place, which, along with 1998, were the country's worst result in the contest at that time. Greece was one of only three countries (along with Romania and Russia) to have never failed to qualify from the semifinals since their 2004 introduction (2004–15). In addition, Greece also qualified from the 1996 audio-only pre-qualifying round.

In 2013, ERT was shut down by a government directive and replaced with the interim Dimosia Tileorasi (DT) and later by the NERIT broadcaster. During this time, from 2013 through 2015, the Greek television station MAD TV organised the selection process. On 28 April 2015, a legislative proposal that resulted in the renaming of NERIT to ERT was approved and signed into law by the Hellenic Parliament; ERT began broadcasting once again on 11 June 2015, and shortly after confirmed their intentions to once again participate in the Eurovision Song Contest.

For 2016, ERT selected the Eurovision entry internally. They selected the band Argo with the song "Utopian Land". For the first time since the semi-finals were introduced in 2004, Greece failed to qualify for the final, after finishing 16th in the first semi-final.

In 2017, ERT selected the composer Dimitris Kontopoulos and the choreographer Fokas Evangelinos internally. They chose Demy for representing Greece in Kyiv. ERT agreed, and on 6 March 2017, Greece chose their song via a national final. Three songs were competed: "Angels", "This Is Love" and "When the Morning Comes Around". The final result was combined by 70% from televoting and by 30% from international juries from nine countries. Finally, "This Is Love" gained 70% and won the national final. At Eurovision, she qualified for the Grand Final, where she finished in 19th place with 77 points.

For 2018, the Greek broadcaster decided to hold a national final to choose the Greek entry to Lisbon and was to take place on 22 February 2018. However, on 16 February 2018 ERT confirmed Yianna Terzi as the Greek representative for the 2018 contest following the disqualification of Areti Ketime and Chorostalites, with the selected song being "Oniro mou". In Lisbon, Greece failed to qualify for the grand final for the second time on its participation history. In 2019, ERT selected internally Katerine Duska to represent Greece in Tel Aviv with the song "Better Love" finishing 21st. It was later revealed that Greece placed fifth in the semi-final, receiving a total of 185 points.

=== 2020s ===
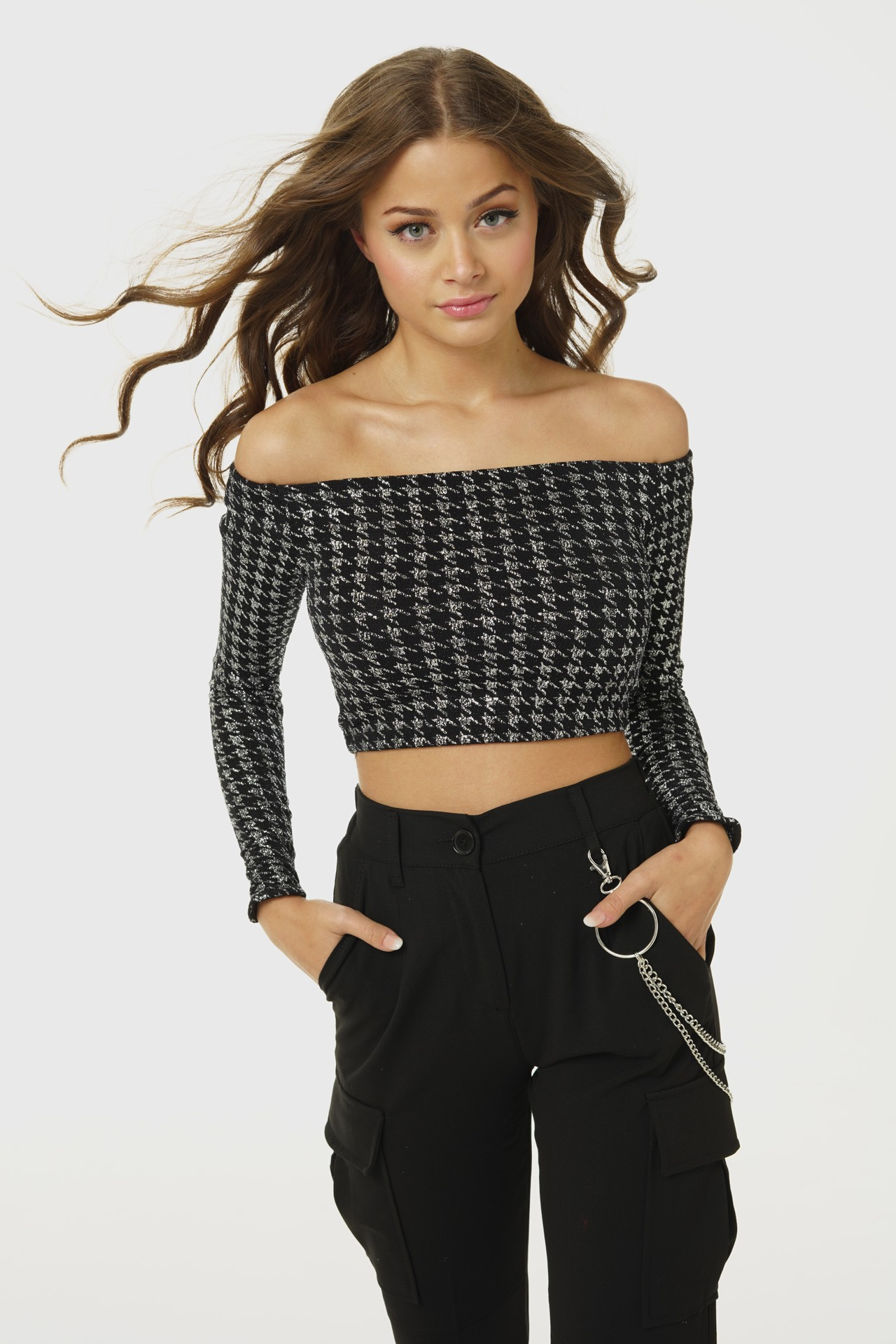
Greek-Dutch performer Stefania was selected as the entrant for Greece in both 2020 and 2021.

In 2020, ERT once again decided to select the Greek entry internally. Seven acts were shortlisted to represent Greece in Rotterdam, including Irini Papadopoulou, Stefania, Ian Stratis, and the boy band One, with Stefania ultimately being announced as the entrant on 3 February 2020 with the song "Supergirl". Greece was drawn to compete in the second semi-final and was to perform in the first position, but on 18 March, the contest was cancelled due to the COVID-19 pandemic. The EBU announced soon after that entries intended for 2020 would not be eligible for the following year, though each broadcaster would be able to send either their 2020 representative or a new one. ERT responded that its intention was to continue its cooperation with Stefania for the next contest in 2021. It was also announced that the same team that was responsible for the songwriting and the choreography of the 2020 entry would also be used for the 2021 contest, and that the song would be selected internally. The selected song, "Last Dance", an 80's-pop song, premiered for the first time on 10 March 2021. The entry placed sixth in the second semi-final and qualified to the final, where it finished in 10th place with 170 points.

For 2022, ERT opened a submission period on 7 September 2021 where artists and composers were able to submit up to three songs each for consideration by the broadcaster with a 10 October 2021 deadline. 25 artists were reported to have submitted applications from a total of more than 40 entries, and a seven-member jury panel shortlisted five entrants in late October 2021. On 15 December 2021, the committee selected the Greek-Norwegian artist Amanda Tenfjord with the song "Die Together" to represent the country in Turin. Greece managed to qualify from the first semi-final, placing third, and finished in eighth place in the final with 215 points: 57 points from the televoting and 158 points from the juries. This was the best placement for the nation in the final since its sixth-place finish in 2013.

In 2023, Victor Vernicos represented the nation with the song "What They Say". Competing in the second semi-final, Greece did not qualify for the final for the third time in its history. The song received nationwide controversies with the shortlisted artist Melissa Mantzoukis taking legal action against the potential rigging of the results, including a 15th place of her submitted song "Liar" in the upcoming contest, represented by Silia Kapsis for Cyprus. The Greek audience responded demanding a return of the national final.

In 2024, ERT opted again for an internal selection in 2024, announcing Marina Satti as the Greek representative on 24 October 2023. She finished fifth in the semi-final and ultimately came 11th in the final with 126 points.

In 2025, ERT returned its national final, Ethnikós Telikós, that took place on 30 January 2025, where Asteromata by Klavdia was chosen. She managed to finish 6th in the grand final, marking the country's highest result since 2013, and the second highest score of its participation. Due to the success and the highly recorded viewing figures of the nation, ERT announced a revamped version of Ethnikós Telikós for the upcoming editions.

In 2026, Ethnikós Telikós returned once again with Akylas and his song "Ferto" being chosen to represent Greece in which managed to qualify for the final. He finished 10th after gathering 220 points from juries' and audience's votes.

== Voting ==
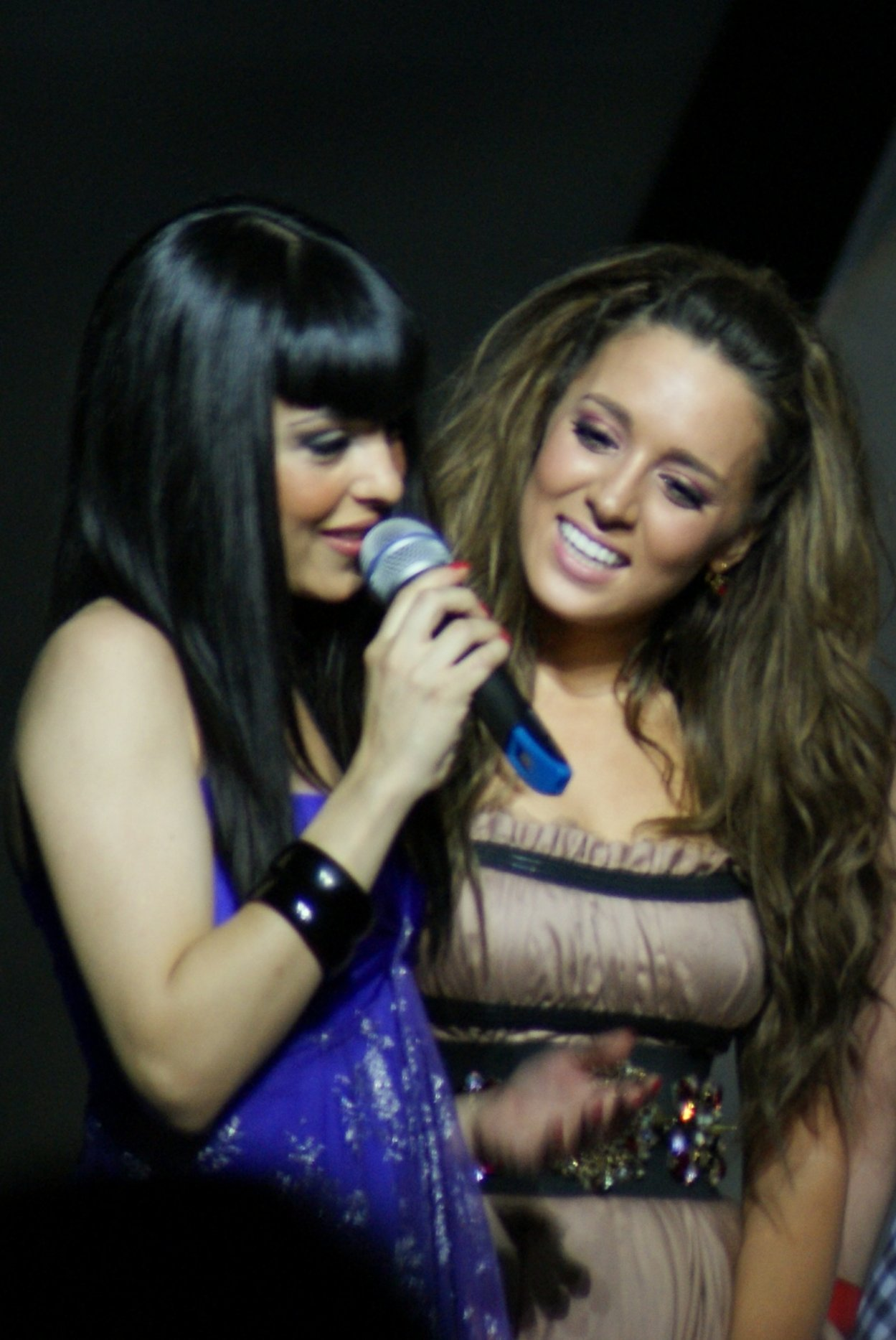
2008 entrants from Cyprus (Evdokia Kadi) and Greece (Kalomira) at a contest press event.

"Cyprus and Greece are commonly accused of favouring each other and of all the countries, statistics suggest they are the most likely to vote for each other. Wogan seemed to sum it up when Cyprus awarded Greece 12 points in last year's contest. 'Over the years people say this is ludicrous [...] but still they do it. They just don't care.' "

— Ruth Alexander, "The maths of Eurovision voting", BBC News

Greece is infamous for regularly exchanging 12 points with Cyprus, which was attributed to the two countries' close cultural ties. While Greece and Cyprus did exchange top marks a few times (1987, 1994, and 1997), there were also several years where this did not occur. In 1983, the second time Greece and Cyprus competed together, Greece awarded the Cypriot entry no points for the first and only time. However, between 1997 and 2013, the two countries always gave each other twelve points if presented the opportunity. Due to the controversies caused by political voting, two semi-finals were introduced for the 2008 contest in which Cyprus and Greece were unable to vote for each other in the semi-finals. In the build-up to the 2008 contest, however, the artists representing Greece and Cyprus jointly held a successful warm-up party at the Euroclub, attended by 17 other delegations from the contest and 1500 guests attracted by the promised "confluence of the Greek-Cypriot sound".

In the 21st century, Greece and Cyprus did not exchange top marks for each other in three instances: In 2015, Greece gave Cyprus 10 points and Cyprus gave Greece 8 points, while both countries gave the maximum 12 points to Italy. In 2023, the Greek jury gave 4 points to Cyprus. In 2024, while the two countries did award 12 points to each other in televoting, the Greek jury awarded Cyprus 10 points, while the Cypriot jury gave Greece 7 points.

== Participation overview ==
Table key
1	First place
2	Second place
3	Third place
◇	Entry selected but did not compete
†	Upcoming event

Year	Artist	Song	Language	Final	Points	Semi	Points
1974	Marinella	"Krassi, thalassa ke t' agori mou" (Κρασί, θάλασσα και τ' αγόρι μου)	Greek	11	7	No semi-finals	
1976	Mariza Koch	"Panaghia mou, panaghia mou" (Παναγιά μου, παναγιά μου)	Greek	13	20	No semi-finals	
1977	Paschalis, Marianna, Robert and Bessy	"Mathema solfege" (Μάθημα σολφέζ)	Greek	5	92	No semi-finals	
1978	Tania Tsanaklidou	"Charlie Chaplin" (Τσάρλυ Τσάπλιν)	Greek	8	66	No semi-finals	
1979	Elpida	"Socrates" (Σωκράτη)	Greek	8	69	No semi-finals	
1980	Anna Vissi and the Epikouri	"Autostop" (Ωτοστόπ)	Greek	13	30	No semi-finals	
1981	Yiannis Dimitras	"Feggari kalokerino" (Φεγγάρι καλοκαιρινό)	Greek	8	55	No semi-finals	
1982	Themis Adamantidis ◇	"Sarantapente kopelies" (Σαρανταπέντε κοπελιές) ◇	Greek ◇	Withdrawn		No semi-finals	
1983	Christie	"Mou les" (Μου λες)	Greek	14	32	No semi-finals	
1985	Takis Biniaris	"Miazoume" (Μοιάζουμε)	Greek	16	15	No semi-finals	
1986	Polina ◇	"Wagon-lit" (Βαγκόν λι) ◇	Greek ◇	Withdrawn		No semi-finals	
1987	Bang	"Stop" (Στοπ)	Greek	10	64	No semi-finals	
1988	Afroditi Fryda	"Clown" (Κλόουν)	Greek	17	10	No semi-finals	
1989	Marianna	"To diko sou asteri" (Το δικό σου αστέρι)	Greek	9	56	No semi-finals	
1990	Christos Callow	"Horis skopo" (Χωρίς σκοπό)	Greek	19	11	No semi-finals	
1991	Sophia Vossou	"Anixi" (Άνοιξη)	Greek	13	36	No semi-finals	
1992	Cleopatra	"Olou tou kosmou i elpida" (Όλου του κόσμου η ελπίδα)	Greek	5	94	No semi-finals	
1993	Katerina Garbi	"Ellada, hora tou fotos" (Ελλάδα, χώρα του φωτός)	Greek	9	64	Kvalifikacija za Millstreet	
1994	Kostas Bigalis and the Sea Lovers	"To trehantiri (Diri Diri)" (Το τρεχαντήρι (Ντίρι Ντίρι))	Greek	14	44	No semi-finals	
1995	Elina Konstantopoulou	"Pia prosefhi" (Ποια προσευχή)	Greek	12	68	No semi-finals	
1996	Marianna Efstratiou	"Emis forame to himona anixiatika" (Εμείς φοράμε το χειμώνα ανοιξιάτικα)	Greek	14	36	12	45
1997	Marianna Zorba	"Horepse" (Χόρεψε)	Greek	12	39	No semi-finals	
1998	Thalassa	"Mia krifi evaisthisia" (Μια κρυφή ευαισθησία)	Greek	20	12	No semi-finals	
2001	Antique	"Die for You"	Greek, English	3	147	No semi-finals	
2002	Michalis Rakintzis	"S.A.G.A.P.O."	English	17	27	No semi-finals	
2003	Mando	"Never Let You Go"	English	17	25	No semi-finals	
2004	Sakis Rouvas	"Shake It"	English	3	252	3	238
2005	Helena Paparizou	"My Number One"	English	1	230	Top 12 in 2004 final (Note: According to the then-Eurovision rules, the top ten non-Big Four countries from the previous year along with the Big Four automatically qualified for the Grand Final without having to compete in semi-finals. For example, if Germany and France placed inside the top ten, the 11th and 12th spots were advanced to next year's Grand Final along with all countries ranked in the top ten.)	
2006	Anna Vissi	"Everything"	English	9	128	Host country	
2007	Sarbel	"Yassou Maria" (Γειά σου Μαρία)	English	7	139	Top 10 in 2006 final	
2008	Kalomira	"Secret Combination"	English	3	218	1	156
2009	Sakis Rouvas	"This Is Our Night"	English	7	120	4	110
2010	Giorgos Alkaio and Friends	"Opa" (Ώπα)	Greek	8	140	2	133
2011	Loukas Yorkas feat. Stereo Mike	"Watch My Dance"	Greek, English	7	120	1	133
2012	Eleftheria Eleftheriou	"Aphrodisiac"	English	17	64	4	116
2013	Koza Mostra feat. Agathon Iakovidis	"Alcohol Is Free"	Greek, English	6	152	2	121
2014	Freaky Fortune feat. RiskyKidd	"Rise Up"	English	20	35	7	74
2015	Maria Elena Kyriakou	"One Last Breath"	English	19	23	6	81
2016	Argo	"Utopian Land"	English, Greek	Failed to qualify		16	44
2017	Demy	"This Is Love"	English	19	77	10	115
2018	Yianna Terzi	"Oniro mou" (Όνειρό μου)	Greek	Failed to qualify		14	81
2019	Katerine Duska	"Better Love"	English	21	74	5	185
2020	Stefania ◇	"Supergirl" ◇	English ◇	Contest cancelled (Note: The 2020 contest was cancelled due to the COVID-19 pandemic.)			
2021	Stefania	"Last Dance"	English	10	170	6	184
2022	Amanda Georgiadi Tenfjord	"Die Together"	English	8	215	3	211
2023	Victor Vernicos	"What They Say"	English	Failed to qualify		13	14
2024	Marina Satti	"Zari" (Ζάρι)	Greek	11	126	5	86
2025	Klavdia	"Asteromata" (Αστερομάτα)	Greek	6	231	4	112
2026	Akylas	"Ferto" (Φέρτο)	Greek	10	220	7	159
2027	Confirmed intention to participate †						

=== Congratulations: 50 Years of the Eurovision Song Contest ===
Artist	Song	Language	At Congratulations				At Eurovision		
Artist	Song	Language	Final	Points	Semi	Points	Year	Place	Points
Helena Paparizou	"My Number One"	English	4	245	4	167	2005	1	230

=== Songs by language ===
1. English (39.6%)
2. Greek (60.4%)

Songs	Language	Years
32	Greek	1974, 1976, 1977, 1978, 1979, 1980, 1981, ~~1982~~, 1983, 1985, ~~1986~~, 1987, 1988, 1989, 1990,1991, 1992, 1993, 1994, 1995, 1996, 1997, 1998, 2001, 2010, 2011, 2013, 2016, 2018, 2024, 2025, 2026
21	English	2001, 2002, 2003, 2004, 2005, 2006, 2007, 2008, 2009, 2011, 2012, 2013, 2014, 2015, 2016, 2017, 2019, ~~2020~~, 2021, 2022, 2023

== Hostings ==
Year	Location	Venue	Presenters	Ref.
2006	Athens	O.A.C.A. Olympic Indoor Hall	Maria Menounos and Sakis Rouvas	

== Awards ==
=== Marcel Bezençon Awards ===
Year	Category	Song	Performer	Final	Points	Host city	Ref.
2005	Artistic Award (Note: Voted by previous winners.)	"My Number One"	Helena Paparizou	1	230	(Ukraine) Kyiv	

=== Barbara Dex Award ===
Year	Performer	Host city	Ref.
2002	Michalis Rakintzis	(Estonia) Tallinn	

== Related involvement ==
=== Heads of delegation ===
Each participating broadcaster in the Eurovision Song Contest assigns a head of delegation as the EBU's contact person and the leader of their delegation at the event. The delegation, whose size can greatly vary, includes a head of press, the contestants, songwriters, composers and backing vocalists, among others.

Year	Head of delegation	Ref.
1974	Yiorgos Anestopoulos	
2004	Dafni Bokota	
2005	Fotini Yannoulatou	
2007	Stella Gkliana	
2008	Mariza Fakli	
2009	Mariza Fakli	
2010	Mariza Fakli	
2011	Mariza Fakli	
2012	Sinia Koussoula	
2013	Sinia Koussoula	
2014	Sinia Koussoula	
2015	Sinia Koussoula	
2016	Konstantinos Pantzoglou	
2017	Panayiotis Tsolias	
2018	Panayiotis Tsolias	
2019	Maria Koufopoulou	
~~2020~~	~~Maria Koufopoulou~~	
2021	Sofia Dranidou	
2022	Sofia Dranidou	
2023	Monica Papadatou	
2024	Sofia Dranidou	
2025	Konstantinos Pantzoglou	

=== Costume designers ===
Year	Costume designers	Ref.
1974	Menelaos Stogiannis	
1977	Marianna Toli	
1993	Celia Kritharioti	
2001	Marina Kereklidou	
2003	Julien McDonald	
2005	Roberto Cavalli	
2006	Jean Paul Gaultier	
2007	Lakis Gavalas	
2008	J.Lo by Jennifer Lopez	
2009	Celia Kritharioti	
2010	Pantelis Mitsou	
2012	Natar Georgiou	
2014	G-Star	
2015	Dimitris Petrou	
2017	Deux Hommes	
2018	Dimitris Petrou	
2019	Deux Hommes	
~~2020~~	~~Celia Kritharioti~~	
2021	Vrettos Vrettakos	
2022	Celia Kritharioti	
2023	George Segredakis	

=== Commentators and spokespersons ===
For the show's broadcast in Greece, various commentators have provided commentary on the contest in the local language. At the Eurovision Song Contest after all points are calculated, the presenters of the show call upon each voting country to invite each respective spokesperson to announce the results of their vote on-screen.

Television and radio commentators and spokespersons
Year	Television		Radio		Spokesperson	Ref.
Year	Channel	Commentator(s)	Channel	Commentator(s)	Spokesperson	Ref.
1970	EIRT	Unknown	No radio broadcast		Did not participate	
1971	EIRT	Unknown	No radio broadcast		Did not participate	
1972	EIRT	Unknown	No radio broadcast		Did not participate	
1973	EIRT	Unknown	No radio broadcast		Did not participate	
1974	EIRT	Unknown	No radio broadcast		Unknown	
1975	EIRT	Unknown	No radio broadcast		Did not participate	
1976	ERT	Unknown	A Programma	Unknown	Unknown	
1977	ERT	Unknown	No radio broadcast		Unknown	
1978	ERT	Unknown	A Programma	Unknown	Unknown	
1979	ERT	Unknown	A Programma	Unknown	Unknown	
1980	ERT	Mako Georgiadou	No radio broadcast		Unknown	
1981	ERT	Unknown	No radio broadcast		Unknown	
1982	ERT	Unknown	No radio broadcast		Unknown	
1983	ERT	Unknown	B Programma	Unknown	Unknown	
1984	No broadcast				Did not participate	
1985	ERT	Unknown	Unknown		Unknown	
1986	ERT	Unknown	Unknown		Unknown	
1987	ERT	Unknown	Unknown		Unknown	
1988	ET1	Dafni Bokota	Unknown		Unknown	
1989	ET1	Unknown	Unknown		Unknown	
1990	ET1	Unknown	Unknown		Unknown	
1991	ET1	Unknown	Unknown		Unknown	
1992	ET1	Unknown	Unknown		Unknown	
1993	ET1	Unknown	Unknown		Unknown	
1994	Unknown				Fotini Giannoulatou	
1995	Unknown				Fotini Giannoulatou	
1996	Unknown				Niki Venega	
1997	ET1	Dafni Bokota	Unknown		Niki Venega	
1998	Unknown				Alexis Kostalas	
1999	Unknown				Did not participate	
2000	Unknown	Dafni Bokota	Unknown		Did not participate	
2001	Unknown				Alexis Kostalas	
2002	Unknown				Alexis Kostalas	
2003	ET1	Dafni Bokota	ERA 1	Nikos Triboulidis	Alexis Kostalas	
2004	NET	Unknown			Alexis Kostalas	
2005	NET	Alexandra Pascalidou	Unknown		Alexis Kostalas	
2006	NET	Zeta Makripoulia and Giorgos Kapoutzidis	Deftero Programma	Maria Kozakou	Alexis Kostalas	
2007	NET	Fotis Sergoulopoulos and Maria Bakodimou	ERA 1 (Final); Deftero Programma (All shows)	Fotis Sergoulopoulos and Maria Bakodimou	Alexis Kostalas	
2008	NET	Betty and Mathildi Maggira	Unknown	Maria Kozakou	Alexis Kostalas	
2009	Unknown	Betty and Mathildi Maggira	Unknown	Maria Kozakou	Alexis Kostalas	
2010	NET	Rika Vagiani	Deftero Programma	Maria Kozakou	Alexis Kostalas	
2011	NET, ERT HD	Maria Kozakou	Deftero Programma	Maria Kozakou	Lena Aroni	
2012	NET	Maria Kozakou	No radio broadcast		Adriana Magania	
2013	NET	Maria Kozakou and Giorgos Kapoutzidis	Proto Programma, Deftero Programma, Voice of Greece	Maria Kozakou and Giorgos Kapoutzidis	Adriana Magania	
2014	NERIT1, NERIT HD	Giorgos Kapoutzidis (Final); Maria Kozakou (All shows)	No radio broadcast		Adriana Magania	
2015	NERIT1, NERIT HD	Maria Kozakou and Giorgos Kapoutzidis	Deftero Programma	Maria Kozakou and Giorgos Kapoutzidis	Helena Paparizou	
2016	ERT1, ERT HD, ERT World	Maria Kozakou and Giorgos Kapoutzidis	Deftero Programma, Voice of Greece	Maria Kozakou and Giorgos Kapoutzidis	Constantinos Christoforou	
2017	ERT1, ERT HD, ERT World	Maria Kozakou and Giorgos Kapoutzidis	Proto Programma, Voice of Greece	Maria Kozakou and Giorgos Kapoutzidis	Constantinos Christoforou	
2018	ERT2, ERT HD	Alexandros Lizardos and Daphne Skalioni	Deftero Programma, Voice of Greece	Dimitris Meidanis	Olina Xenopoulou	
2019	ERT2, ERT Sports HD	Maria Kozakou and Giorgos Kapoutzidis	Voice of Greece (SF1/Final)	Maria Kozakou and Giorgos Kapoutzidis	Gus G	
~~2020~~	Not announced before cancellation	~~Maria Kozakou and Giorgos Kapoutzidis~~	Not announced before cancellation			
2021	ERT1	Maria Kozakou and Giorgos Kapoutzidis	Deftero Programma, Voice of Greece	Giorgos Katsaros (Final); Dimitris Meidanis (All shows)	Manolis Gkinis	
2022	ERT1	Maria Kozakou and Giorgos Kapoutzidis	Deftero Programma, Voice of Greece	Dimitris Meidanis	Stefania	
2023	ERT1	Maria Kozakou and Jenny Melita	Deftero Programma	Dimitris Meidanis, Maria Kozakou and Jenny Melita	Fotis Sergoulopoulos	
2024	ERT1	Thanasis Alevras and Jérôme Kaluta	Deftero Programma	Dimitris Meidanis	Helena Paparizou	
2025	ERT1	Maria Kozakou and Giorgos Kapoutzidis	Deftero Programma	Dimitris Meidanis	Jenny Theona	
2026	ERT1	Maria Kozakou and Giorgos Kapoutzidis	Deftero Programma, Voice of Greece	Dimitris Meidanis	Klavdia	

==== Other shows ====
Show	Commentator	Channel	Ref.
Congratulations: 50 Years of the Eurovision Song Contest	Elizabeth Filippouli	NET	
Eurovision Song Contest's Greatest Hits	Greek subtitles	NERIT1	
Het Grote Songfestivalfeest	Greek subtitles	ERT1	
Eurovision: Europe Shine a Light	Maria Kozakou	ERT1	

=== Stage directors ===
Year	Stage director	Ref.
1977	Marianna Toli	
1979	Marianna Toli	
1980	Romanos	
1992	Yiorgos Kalogeropoulos	
2001	Yiorgos Kalogeropoulos	
2004	Fokas Evangelinos	
2005	Fokas Evangelinos	
2006	Mia Michaels	
2007	Maria Liraraki	
2008	Kostas Kapetanidis	
2009	Fokas Evangelinos	
2010	Emmy Zarian	
2011	Konstantinos Rigos	
2012	Konstantinos Rigos	
2013	Maria Liraraki	
2014	Yiorgos Papadopoulos	
2015	Maria Liraraki	
2016	Maria Liraraki	
2017	Fokas Evangelinos	
2018	Chali Jennings	
2019	Efi Gousi	
~~2020~~	~~Fokas Evangelinos~~	
2021	Fokas Evangelinos	
2022	Fokas Evangelinos	
2023	Konstantinos Rigos	
2024	Fokas Evangelinos & Mecnun Giasar	

=== Conductors ===
Year	Conductor (Note: All conductors are of Greek nationality unless otherwise noted.)	Notes	Ref.
1974	Giorgos Katsaros		
1976	Michael Rozakis		
1977	Giorgos Hatzinasios		
1978	Charis Andreadis		
1979	Lefteris Chalkiadakis		
1980	Jick Nakassian		
1981	George Niarchos		
1983	Mimis Plessas	Conducted by Lefteris Chalkiadakis at the national final.	
1985	Charis Andreadis	Also conductor of the Cypriot entry.	
1987	George Niarchos		
1988	Charis Andreadis		
1989	George Niarchos		
1990	Michael Rozakis		
1991	Charis Andreadis		
1992	Charis Andreadis		
1993	Charis Andreadis		
1994	(Republic of Ireland) Noel Kelehan	Host conductor	
1995	Charis Andreadis		
1996	Michael Rozakis		
1997	Anacreon Papageorgiou		
No conductor from 1998 to present

=== Jury members ===
A five-member jury panel consisting of music industry professionals is made up for every participating country for the semi-finals and final of the Eurovision Song Contest, ranking all entries except for their own country's contribution. The juries' votes constitute 50% of the overall result alongside televoting. The modern incarnation of jury voting was introduced beginning with the 2009 contest.

Year	First member	Second member	Third member	Fourth member	Fifth member	Ref.
2009	Giorgos Katsaros	Vicky Gerothodorou	Nikos Gritsis	Giannis Vardis	Alexandra Zakka	
2010	Andreas Pylarinos	Poseidon Giannopoulos	Alexandra Zakka	Thanos Kalliris	Konstantinos Pantzis	
2014	Vasilios Apergis	Konstantinos Pantzoglou	Romy Papadea	Aggelos Makris	Maria Sinatsaki	
2015	Jick Nakassian	Antonios Karatzikos	Hellen Giannatsoulia	Ioannis Koutsaftakis	Marianna Efstratiou	
2016	Mariza Fakli	Lambros Konstantaras	Christiana Stamatelou	Georgios Segredakis	Adam Tsarouchis	
2017	Vicky Gerotheodorou	Xenia Ghali	Dimitris Ouggarezos	Akis Anastasiadis	Aris Petrakis	
2018	Nikos Graigos	Yiannis Nikoletopoulos	Ares Anagnostopoulos	Ilenia Williams	Margo Enepekidi	
2019	Nikolaos Nikolakopoulos	Eirini Karagianni	Emmanouil Pantelidakis	Stella Chroneou	Thanasis Alevras	
2021	Xenia Ghali	Athena Konstantinou	Fotis Sergoulopoulos	Adam Tsarouchis	Ioannis Vasilopoulos	
2022	Christianna Danezi	Dimitrios Masouras	Elli Karvoni	Nikos Antoniou	Victoria Halkiti	
2023	Christos Giakoumopoulos	Fotios Giannoutsos	Nikolaos Nikolakopoulos	Claudia Matola	Evanthia Theotokatou	
2024	Anastasios Rosopoulos	Panagiotis Biniaris	Georgia Fotou	Stamatina Kostiani	Vasiliki Karatzoglou	
2025	George Polychroniou	Ioannis Vasilopoulos	Vangelis Konstantinidis	Margarita-Kyriake Mitilinaiou	Mirela Pachou	

== Photo gallery ==
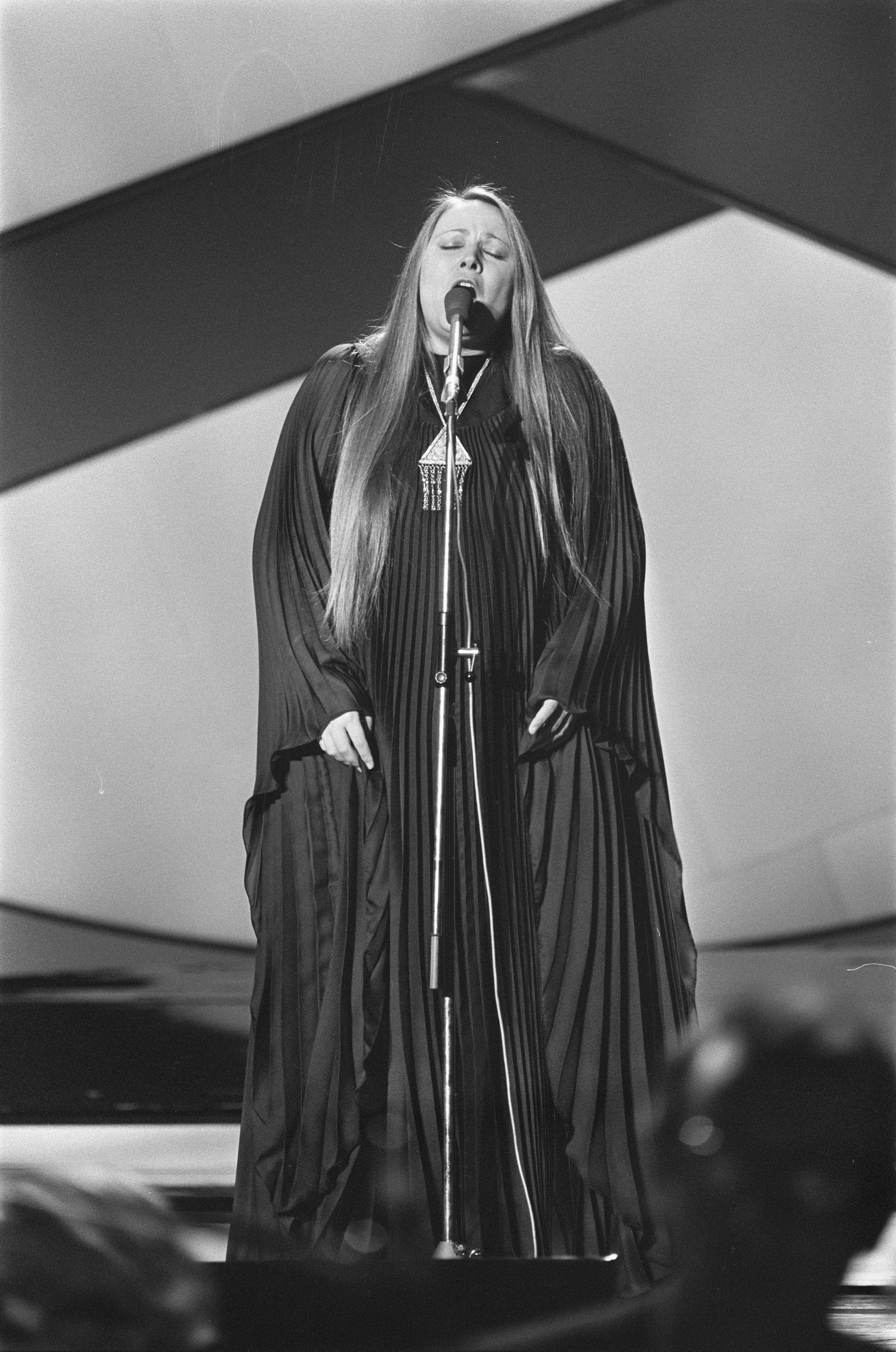
Mariza Koch in the Hague (1976)

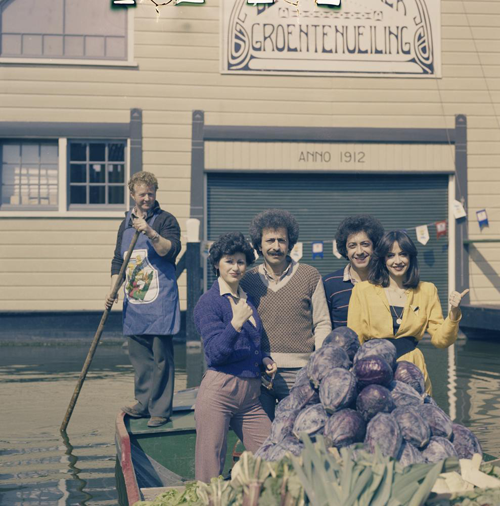
Anna Vissi and the Epikouri in the Hague (1980)

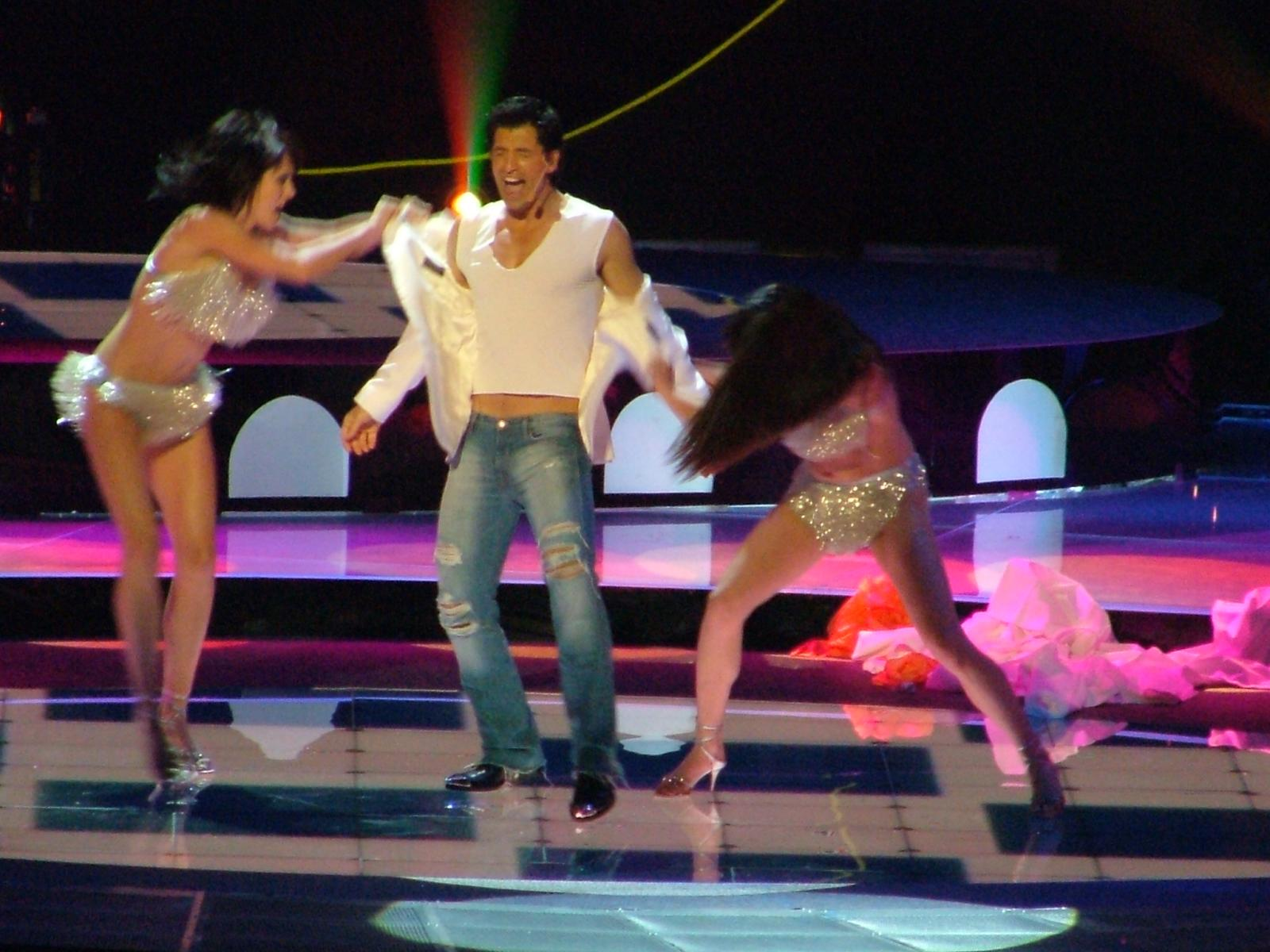
Sakis Rouvas in Istanbul (2004)

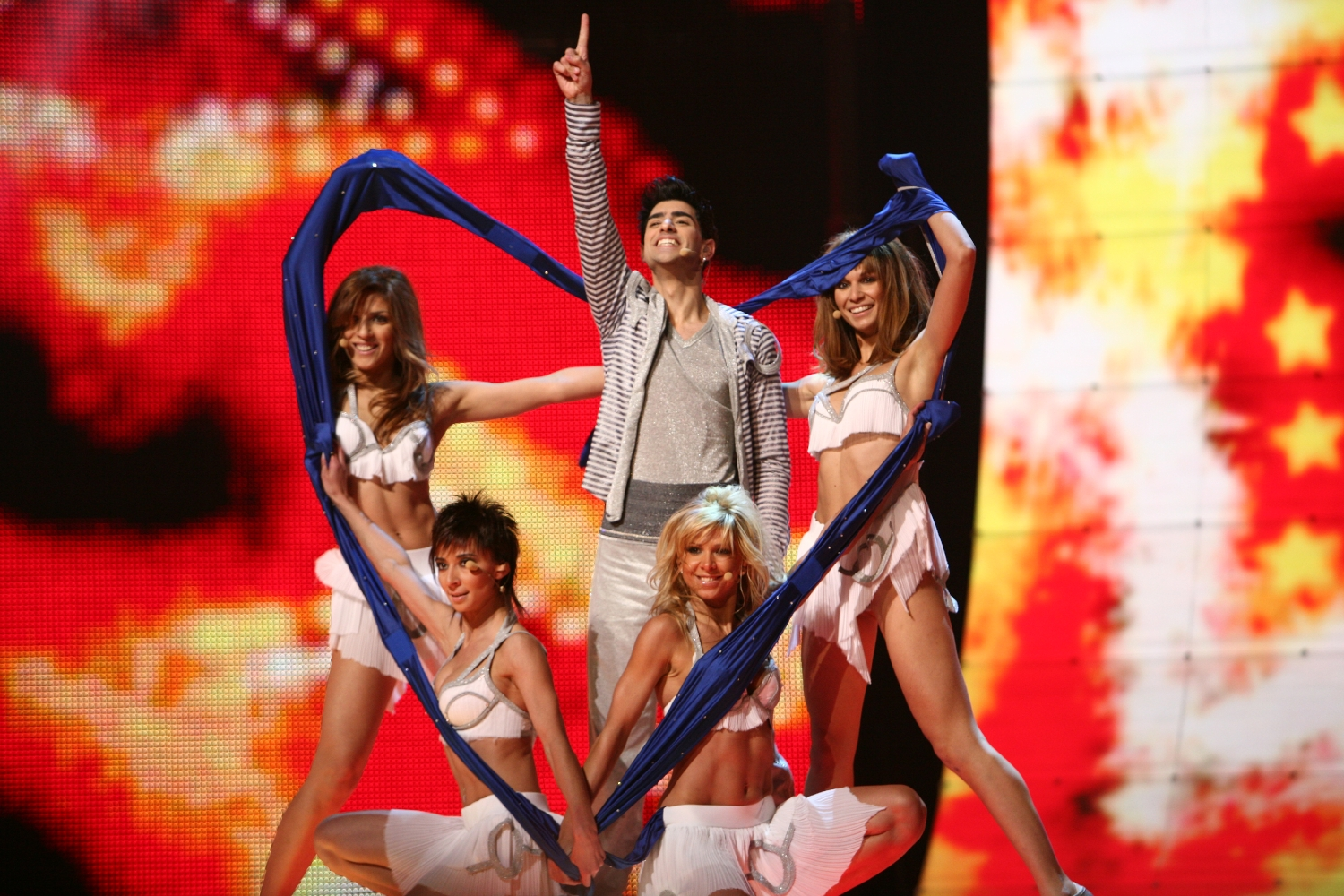
Sarbel in Helsinki (2007)

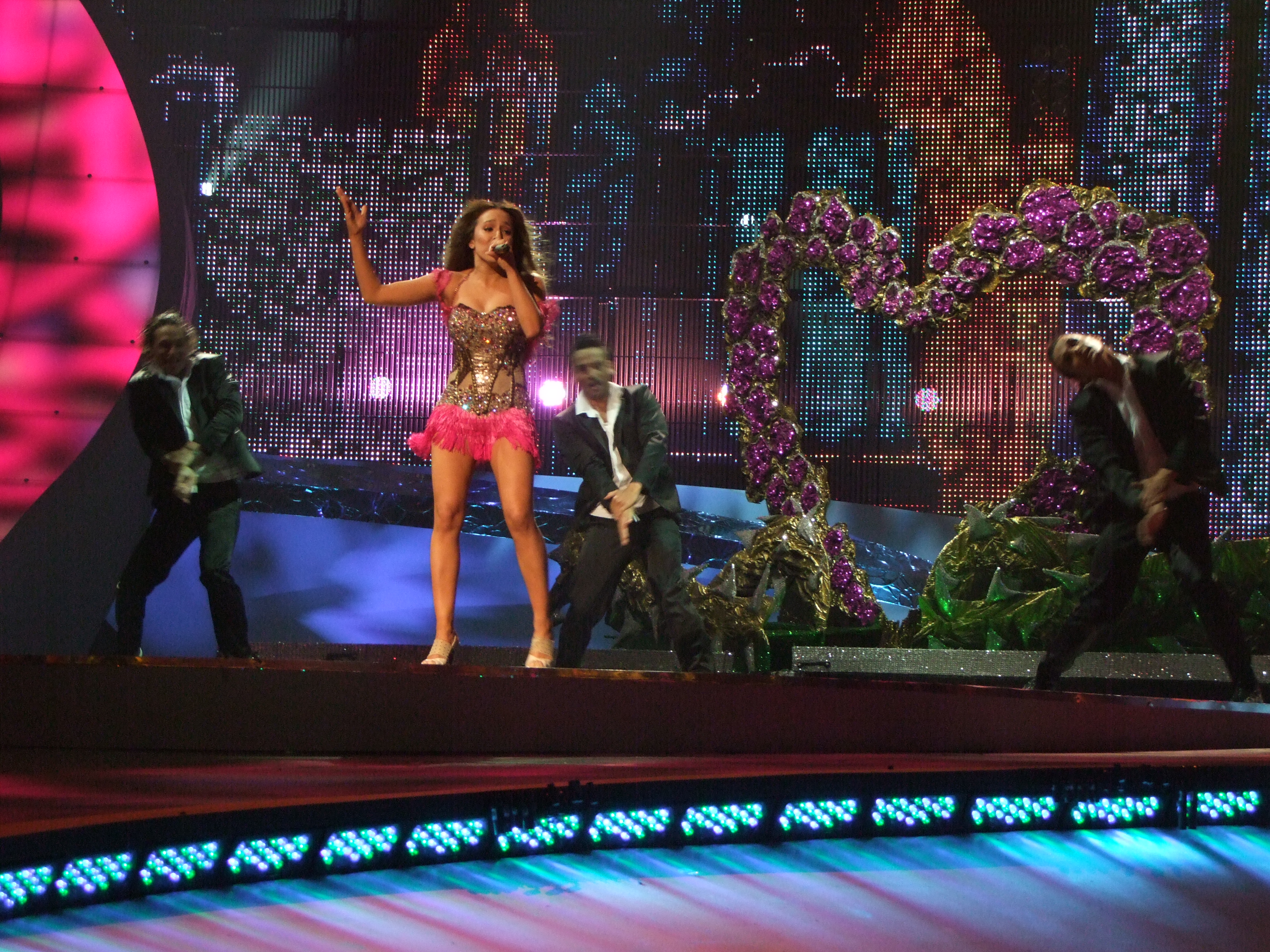
Kalomira in Belgrade (2008)

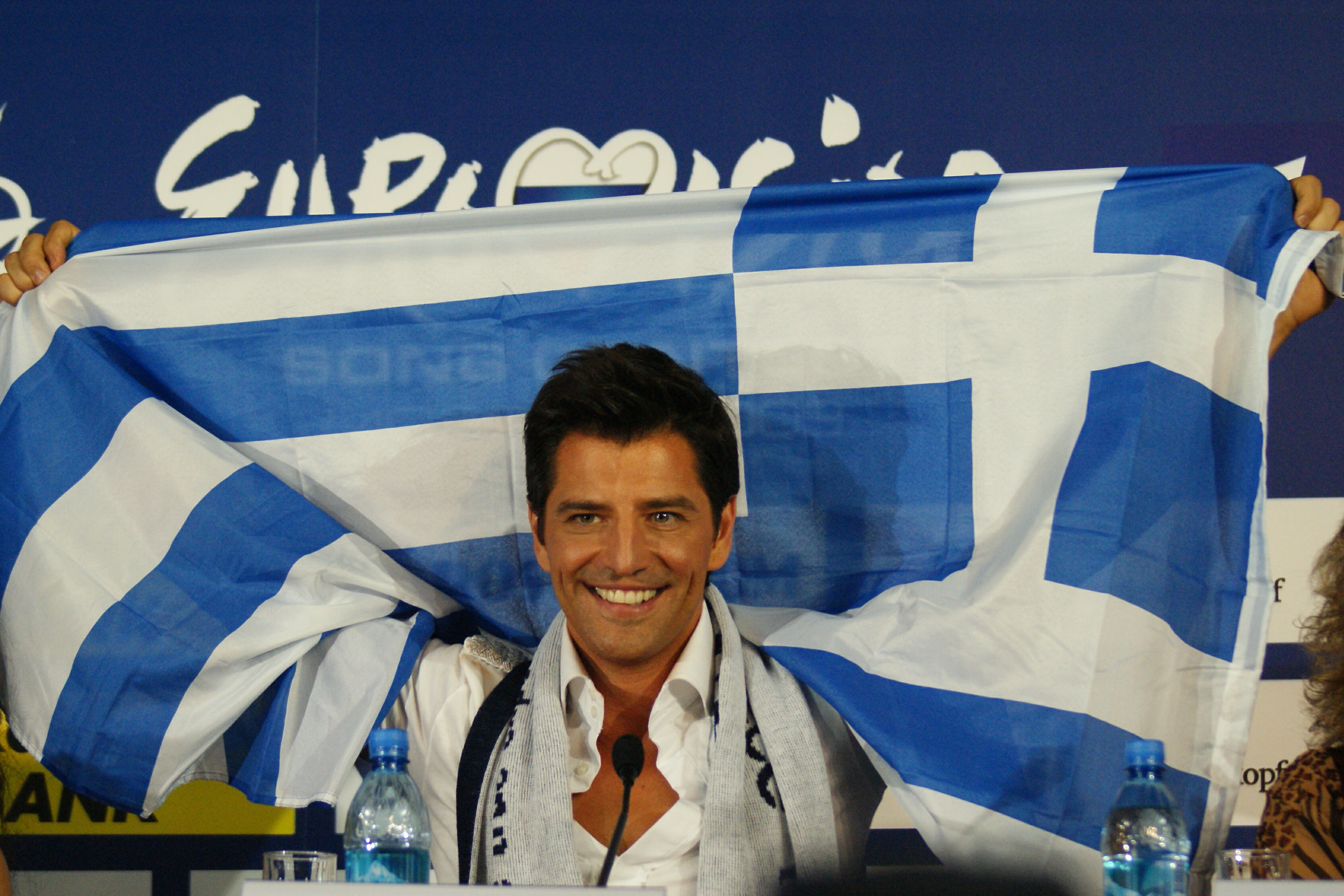
Sakis Rouvas in Moscow (2009)

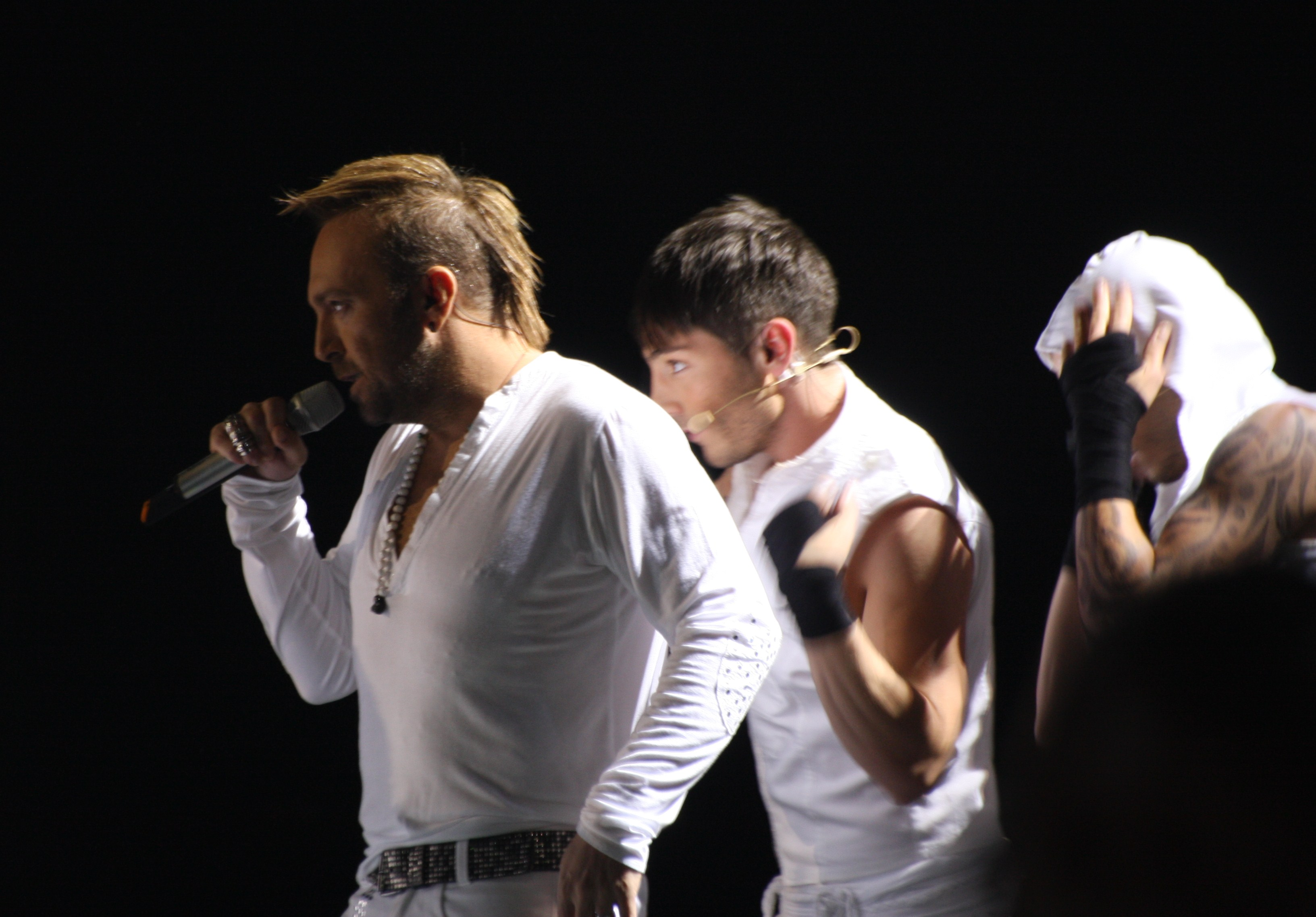
Giorgos Alkaios and Friends in Oslo (2010)

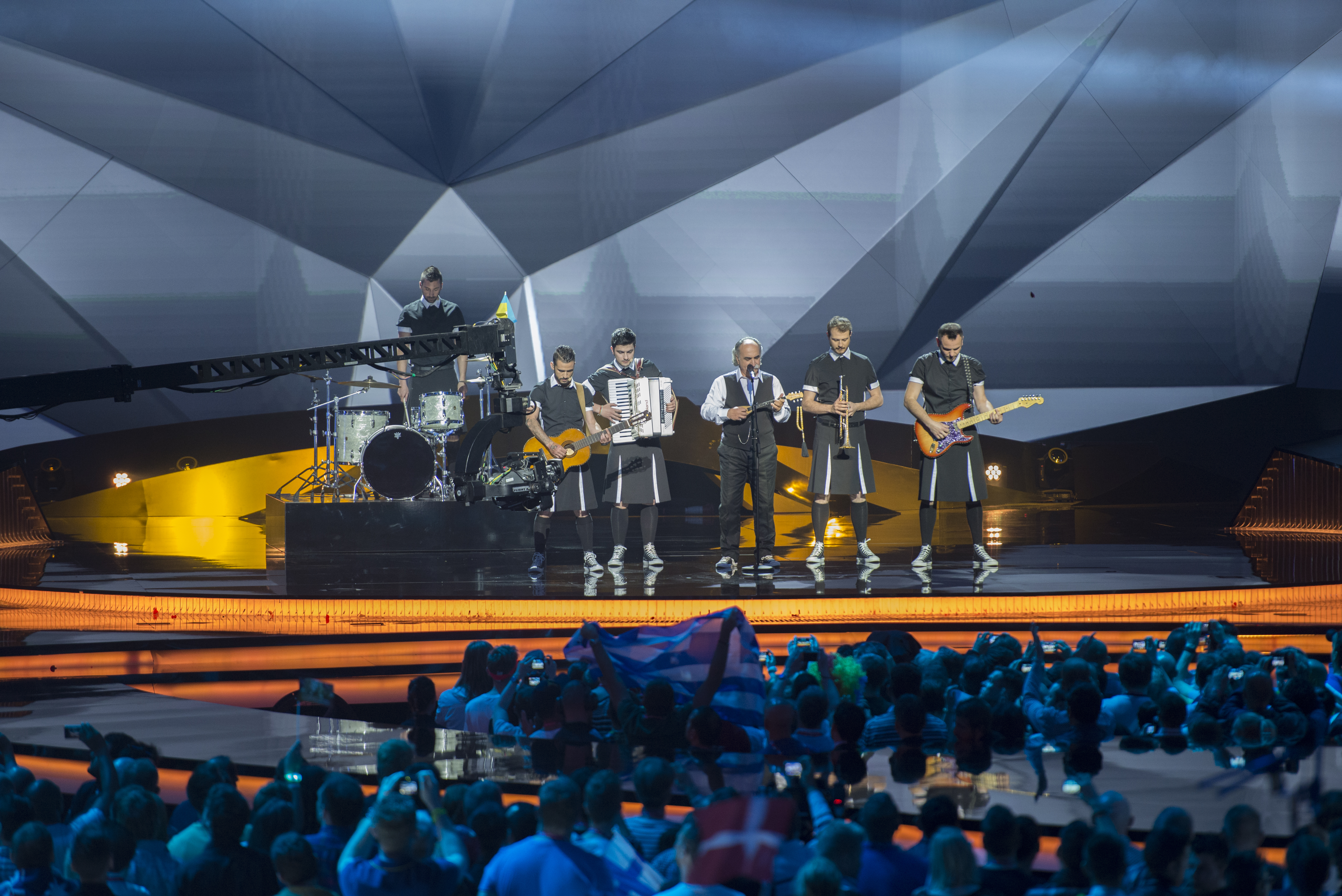
Koza Mostra and Agathonas Iakovidis in Malmö (2013)

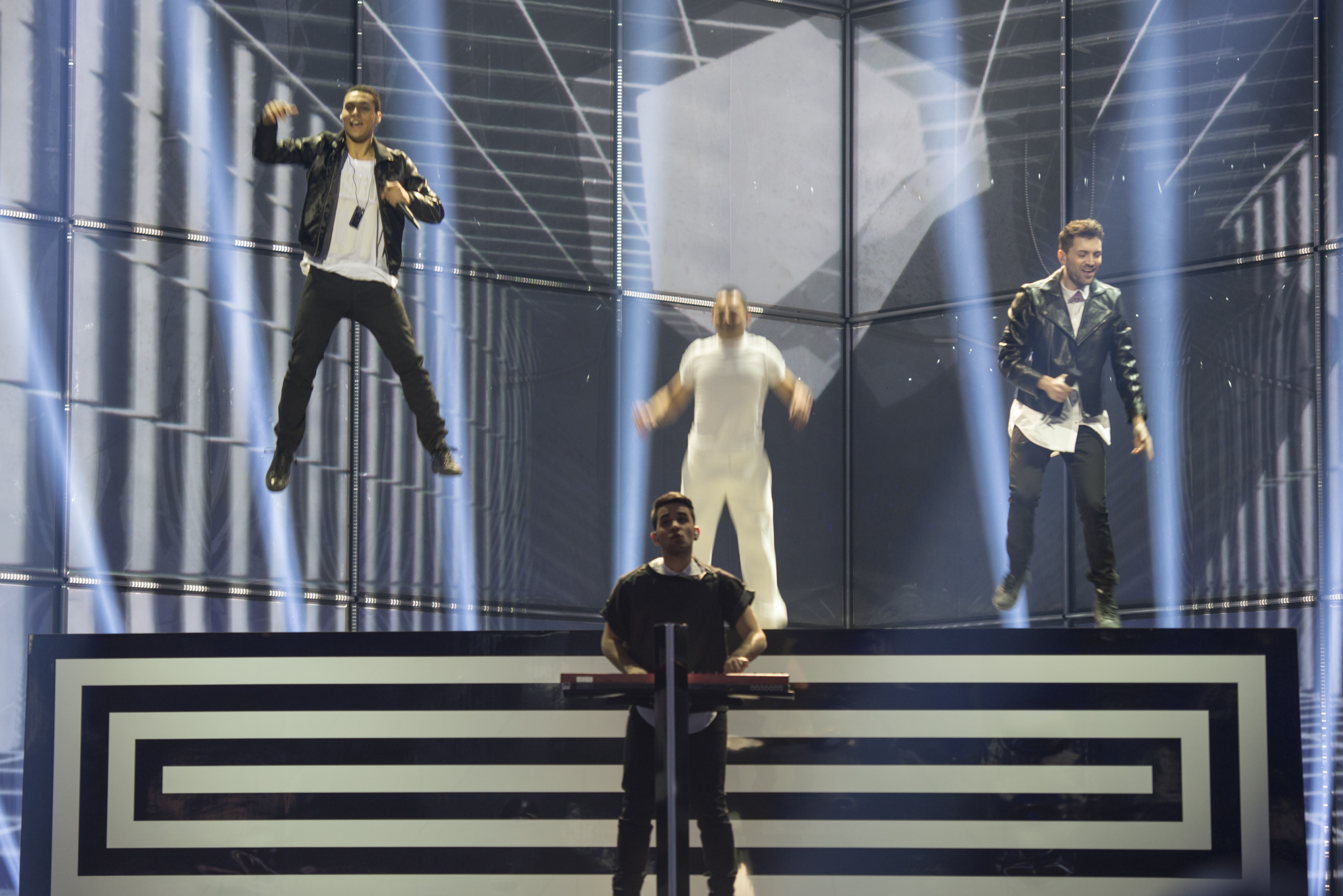
Freaky Fortune and Riskykidd in Copenhagen (2014)

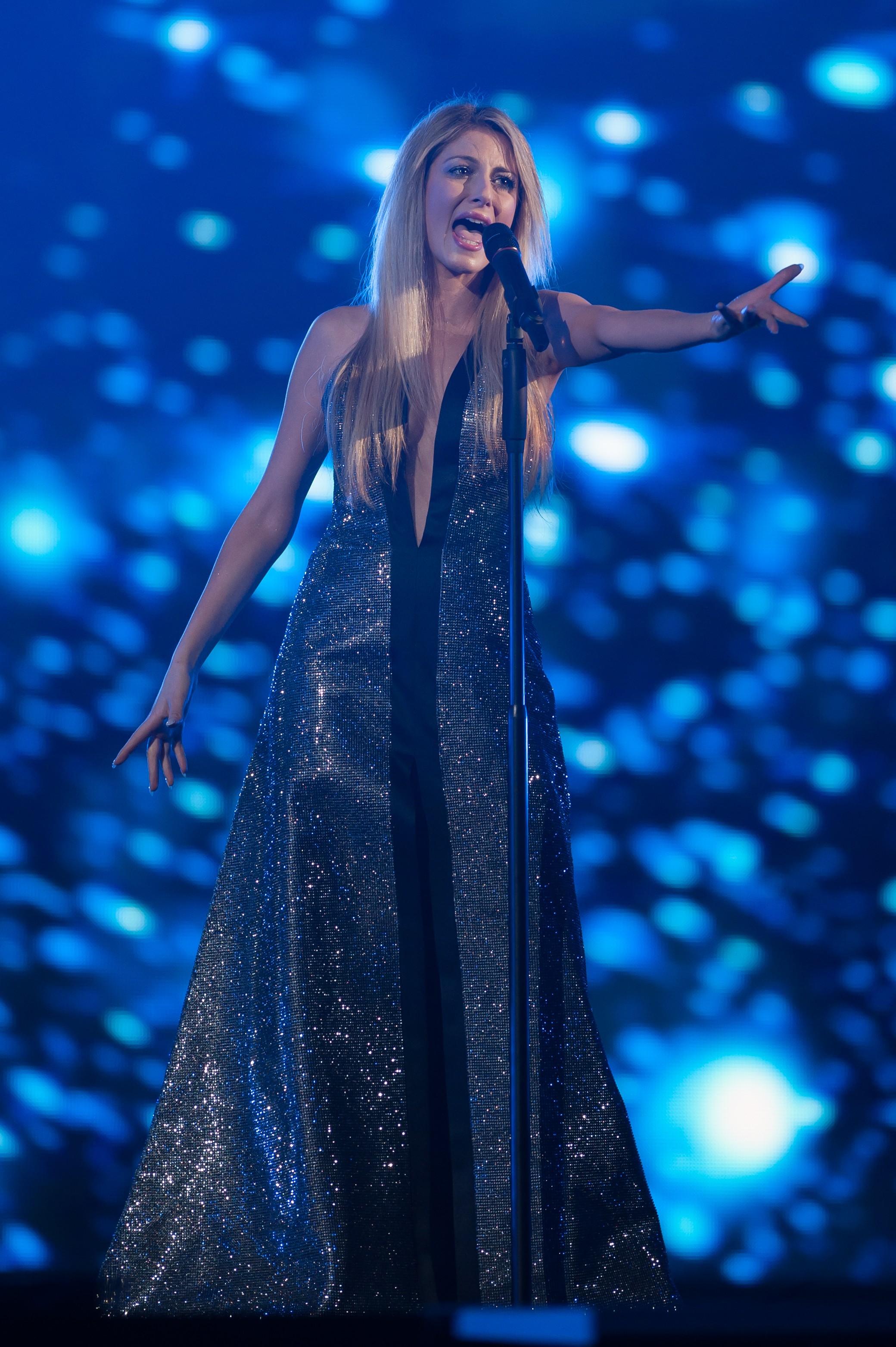
Maria Elena Kyriakou in Vienna (2015)

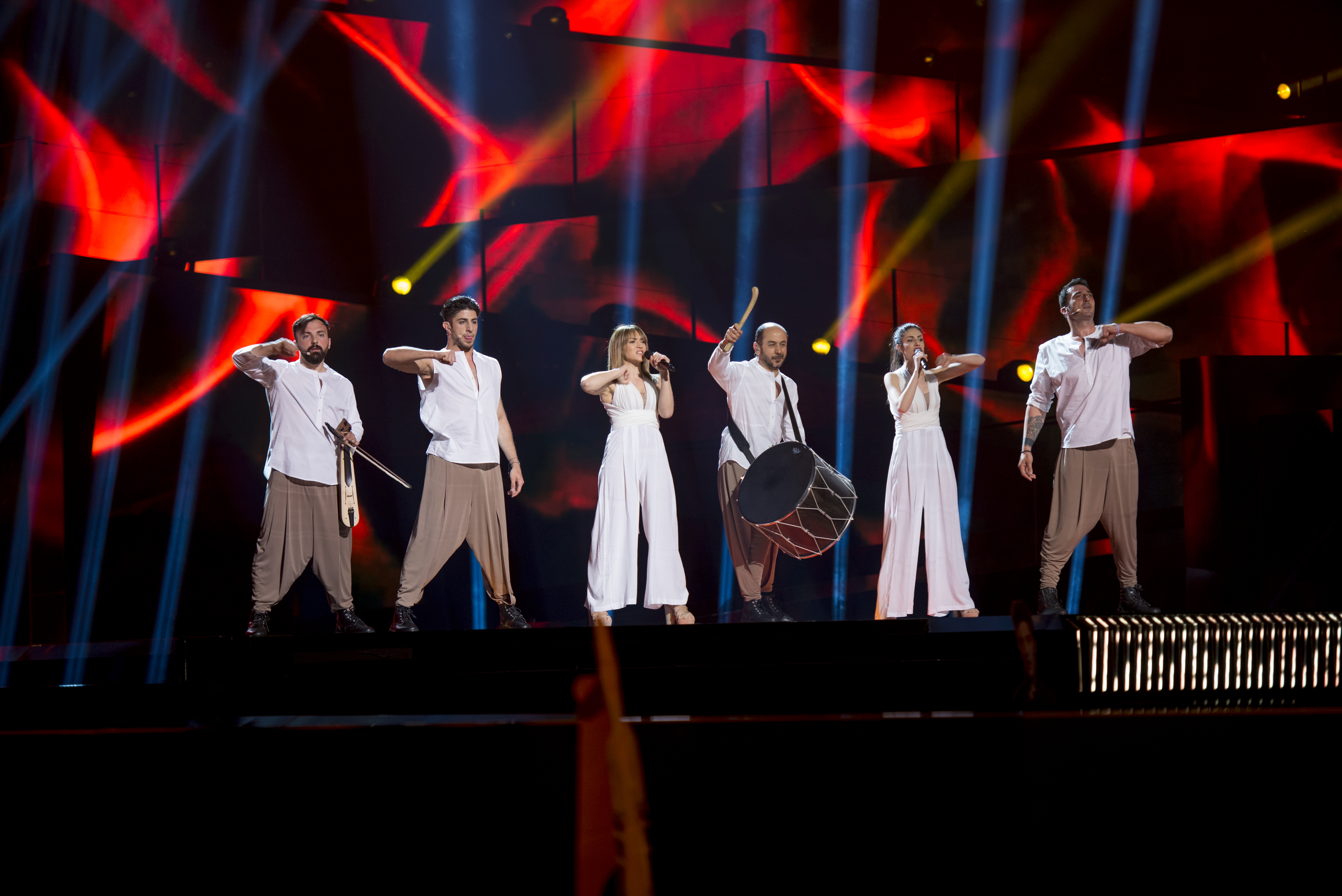
Argo in Stockholm (2016)

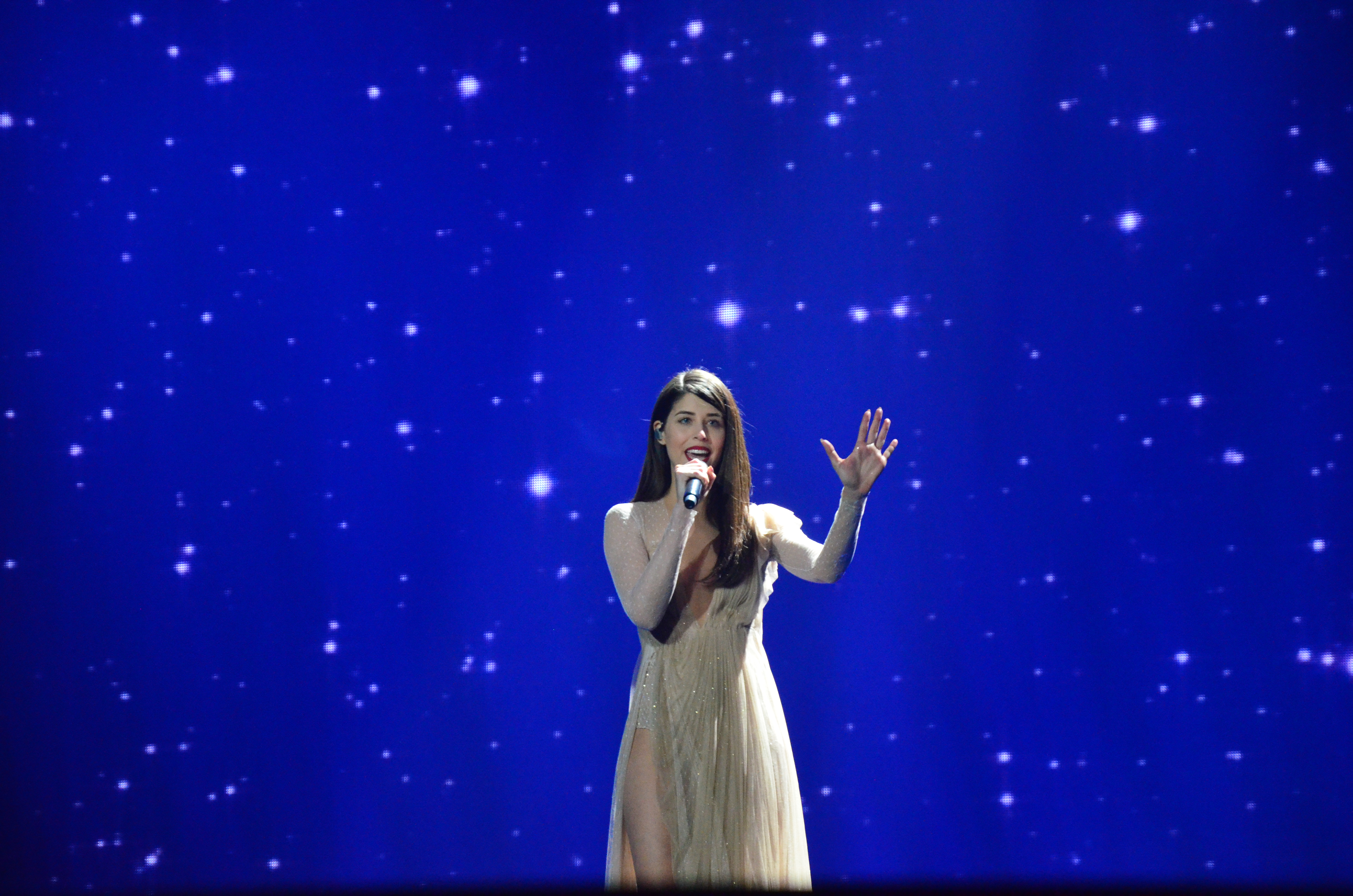
Demy in Kyiv (2017)

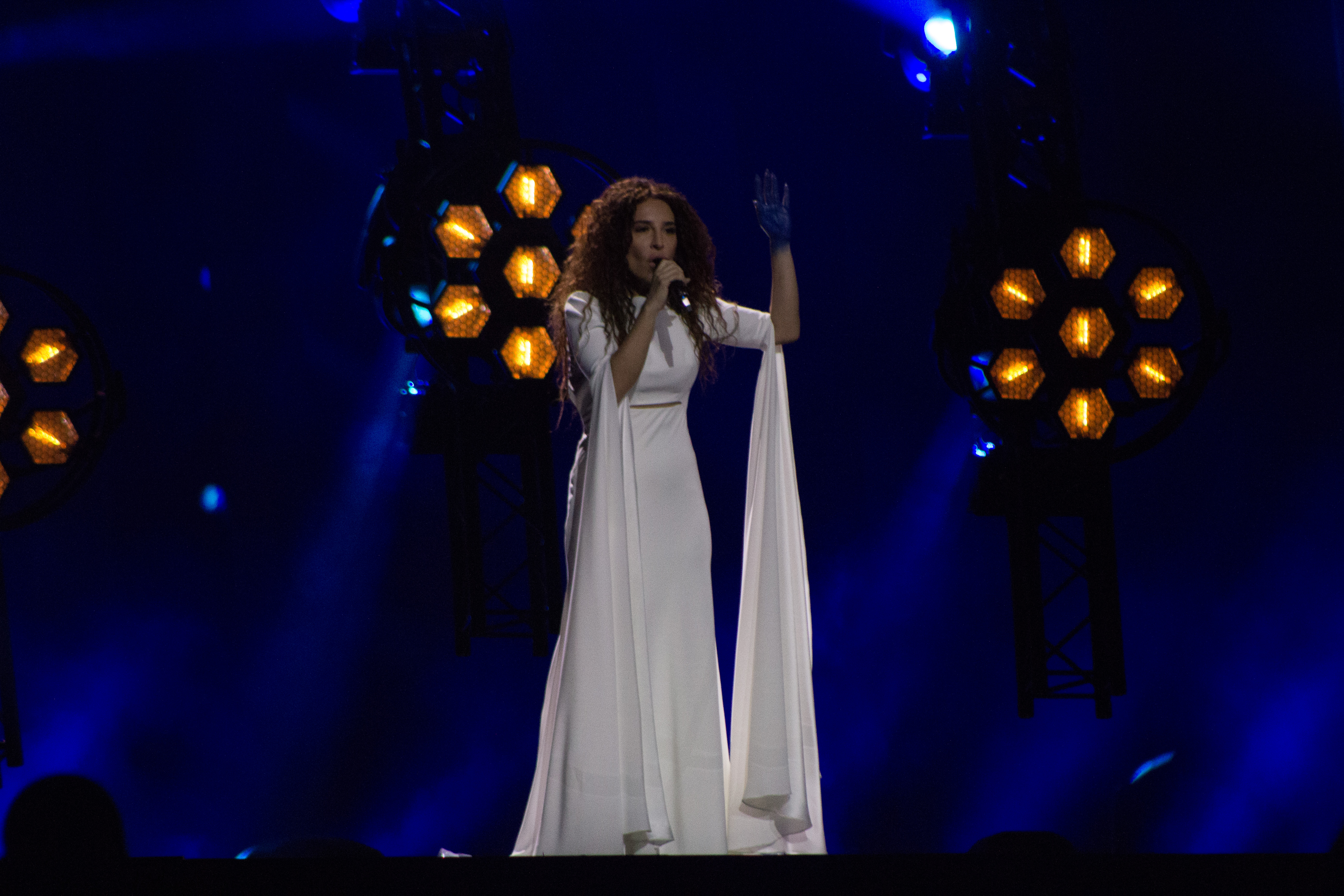
Yianna Terzi in Lisbon (2018)

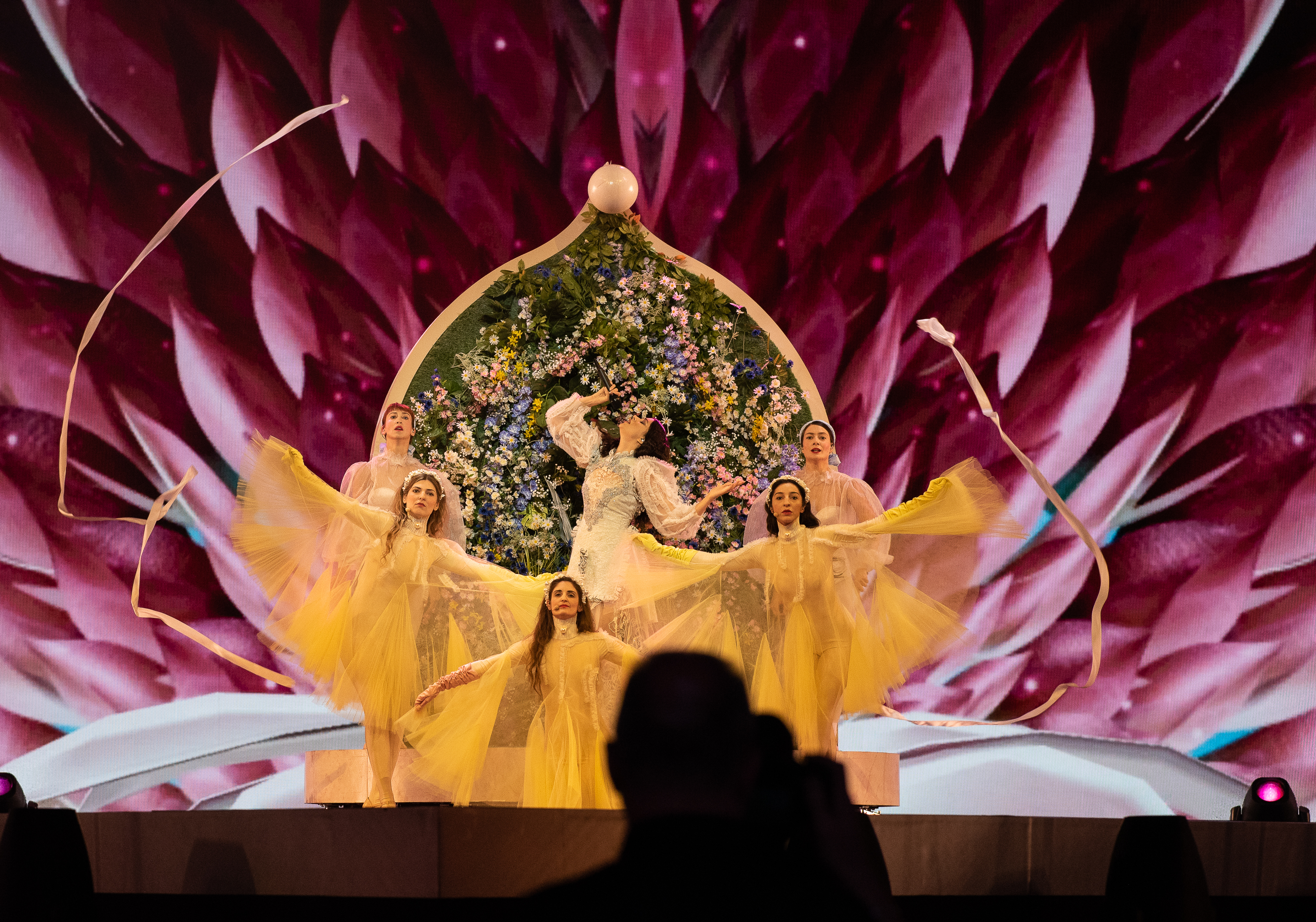
Katerine Duska in Tel Aviv (2019)

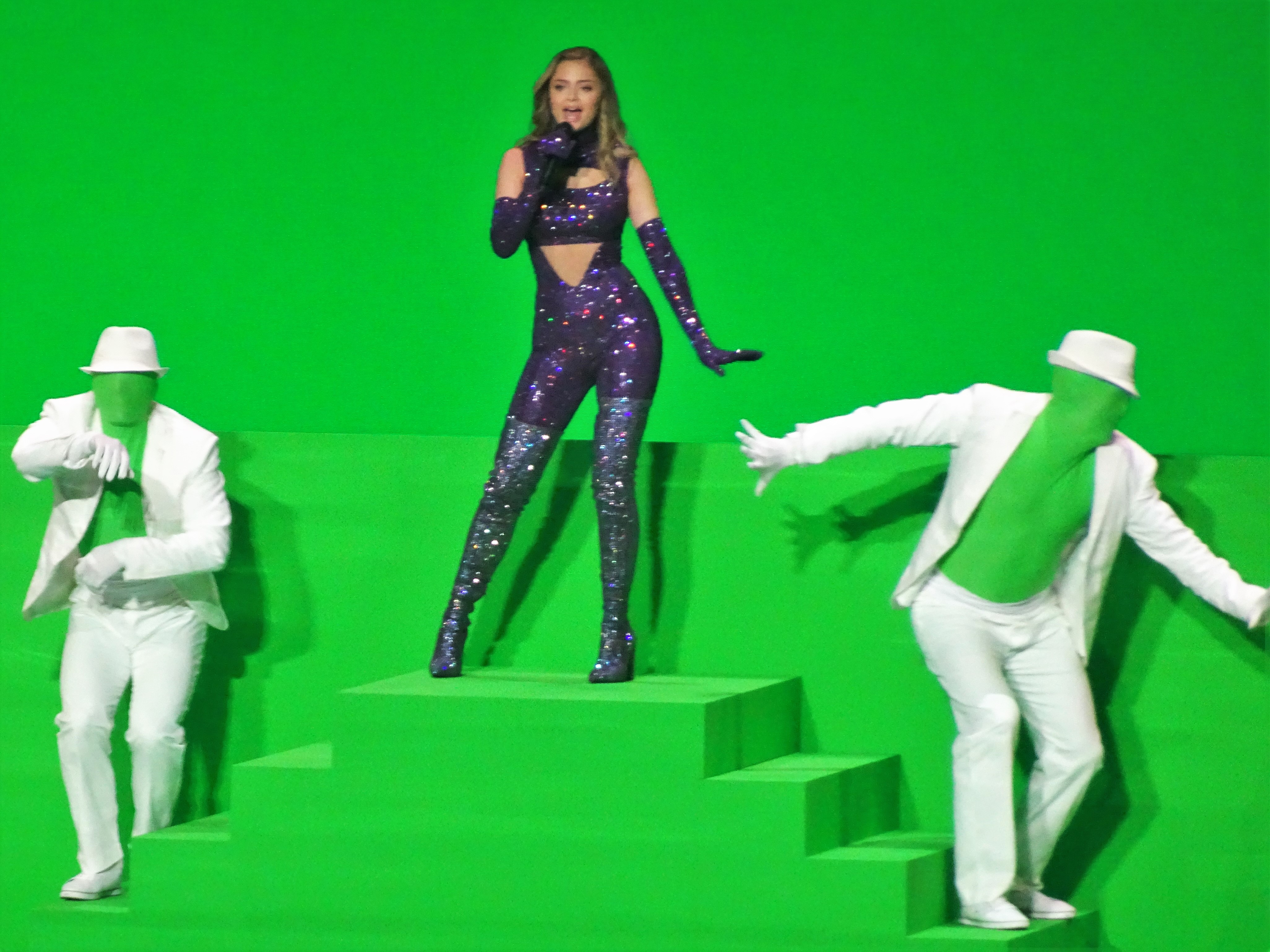
Stefania in Rotterdam (2021)

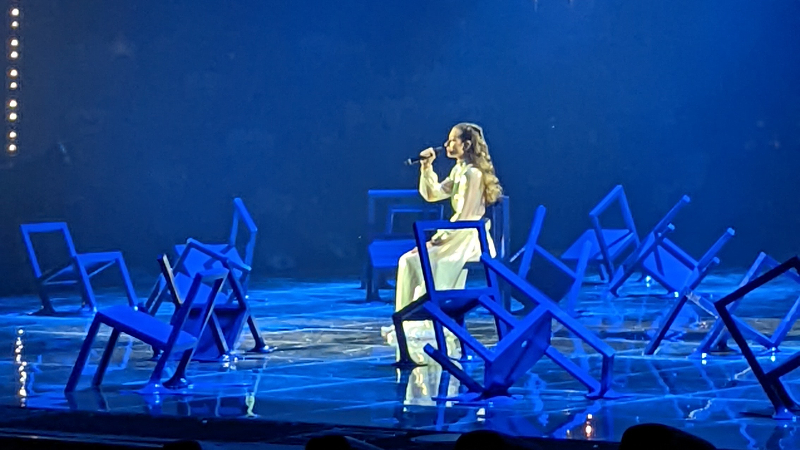
Amanda Tenfjord in Turin (2022)

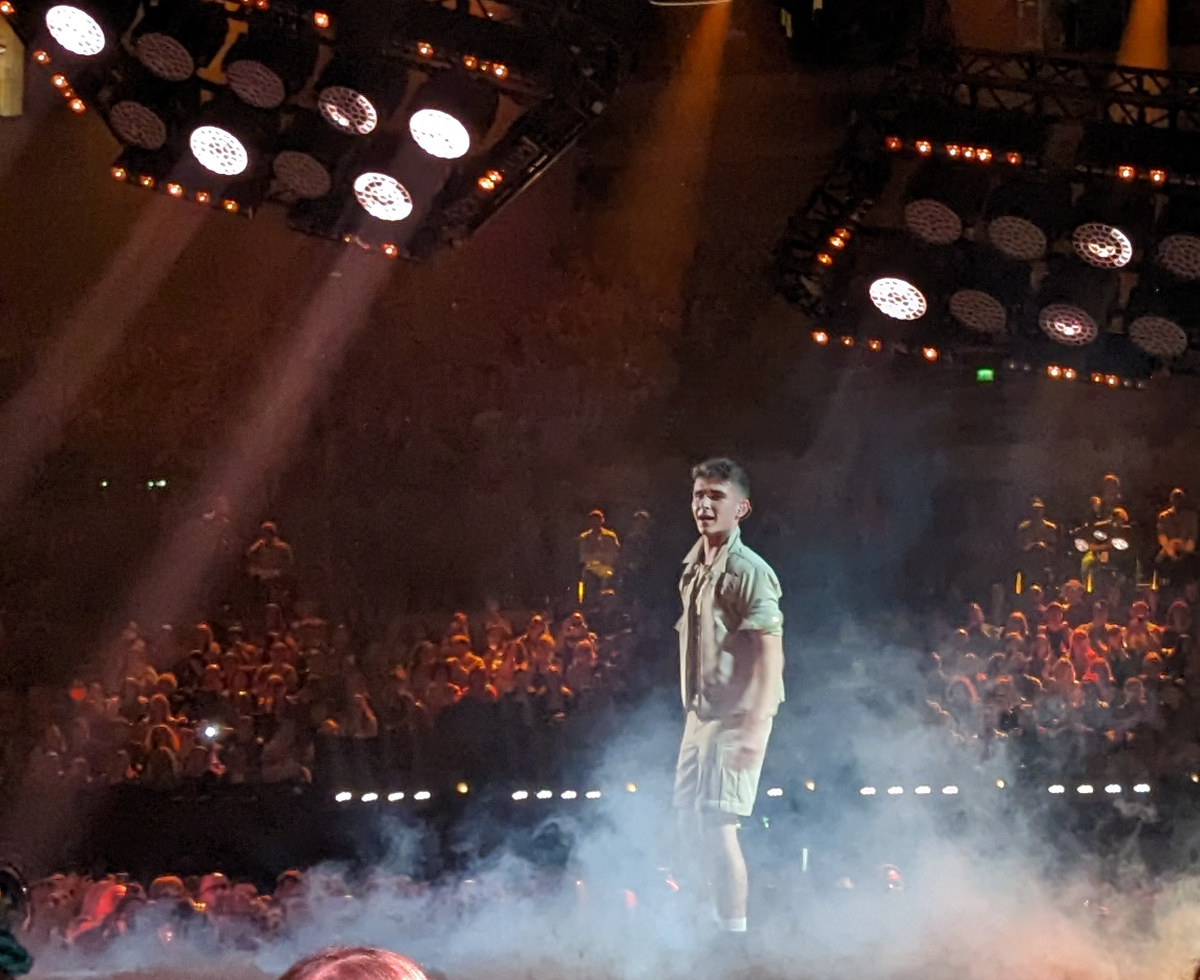
Victor Vernicos in Liverpool (2023)

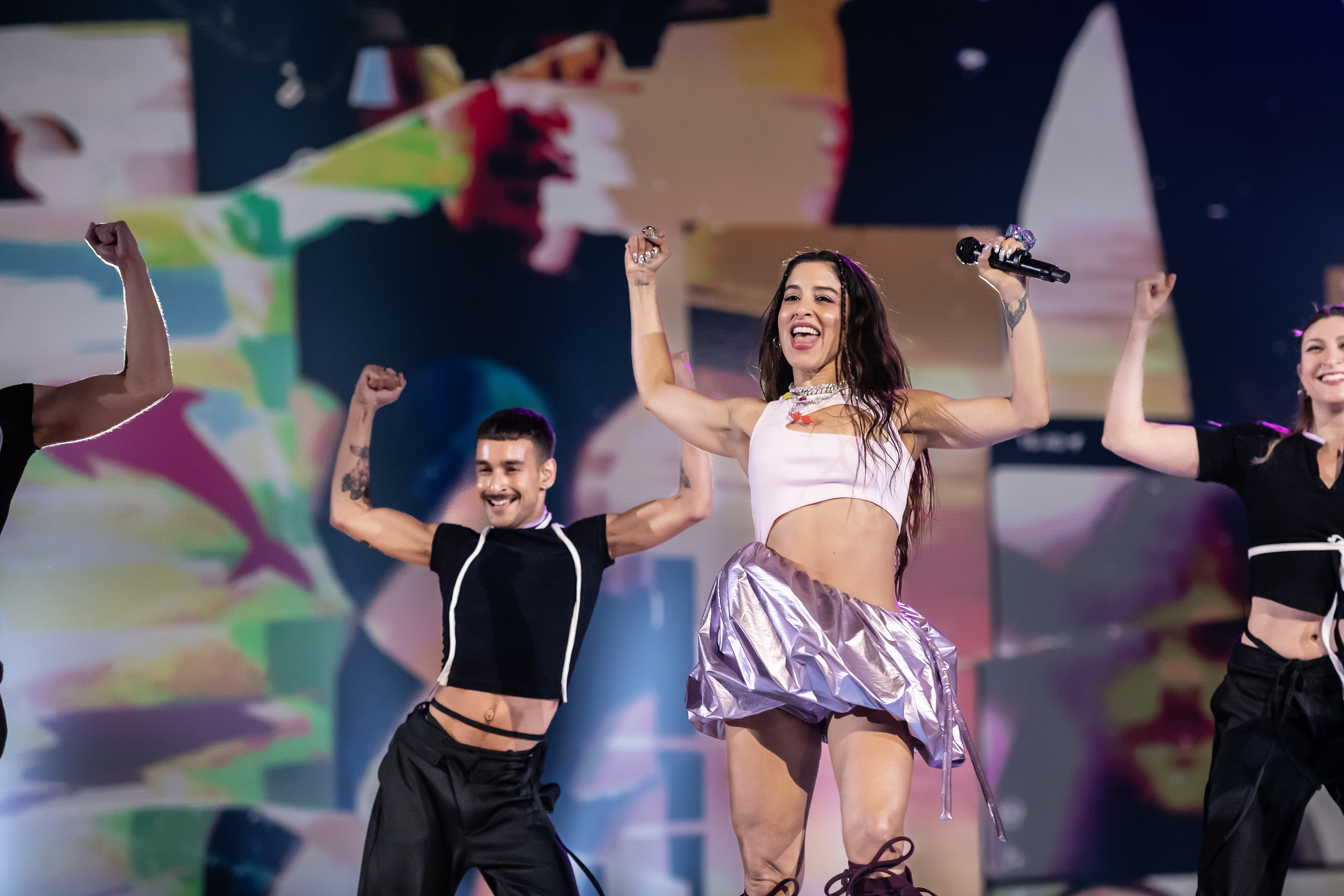
Marina Satti in Malmö (2024)

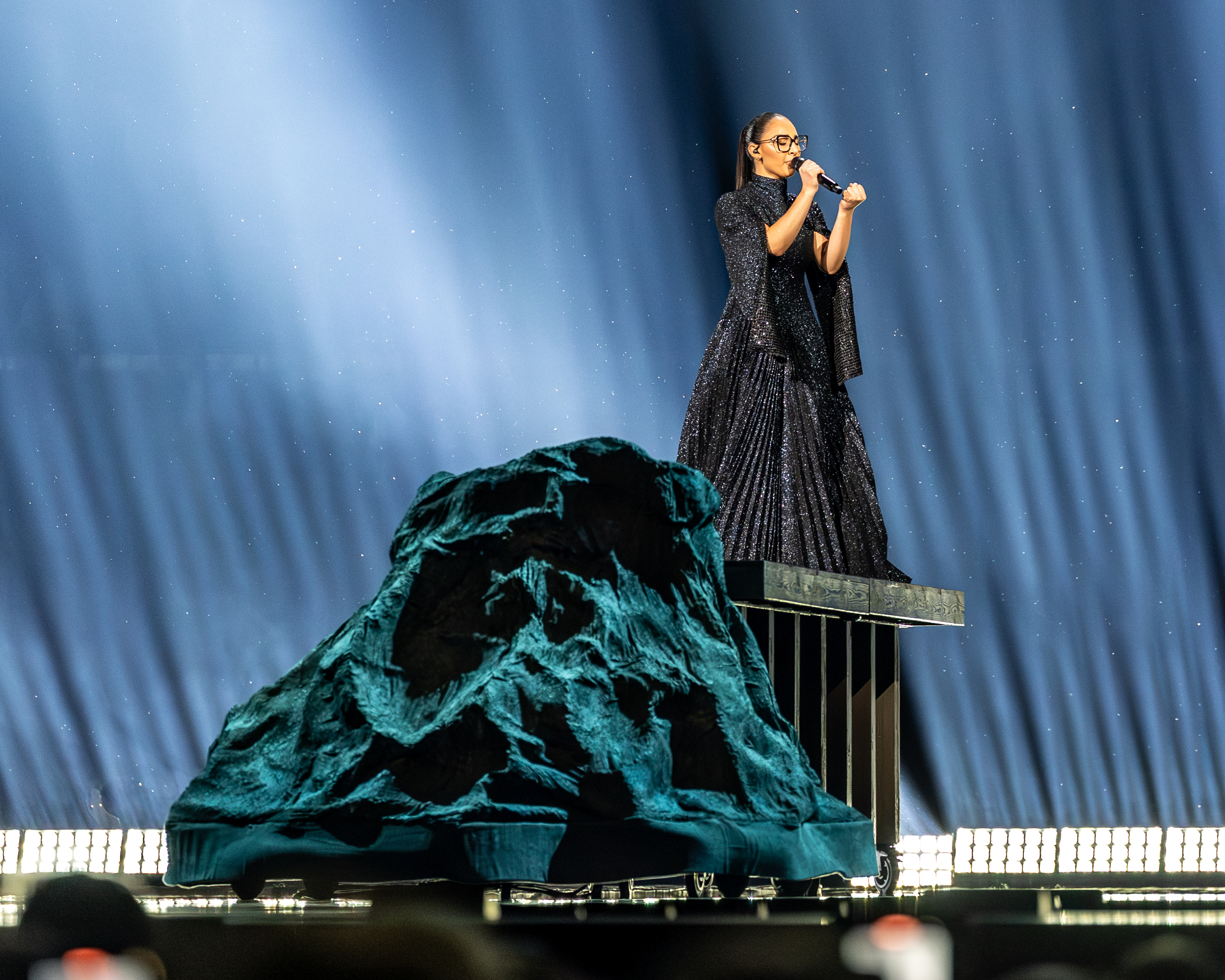
Klavdia in Basel (2025)

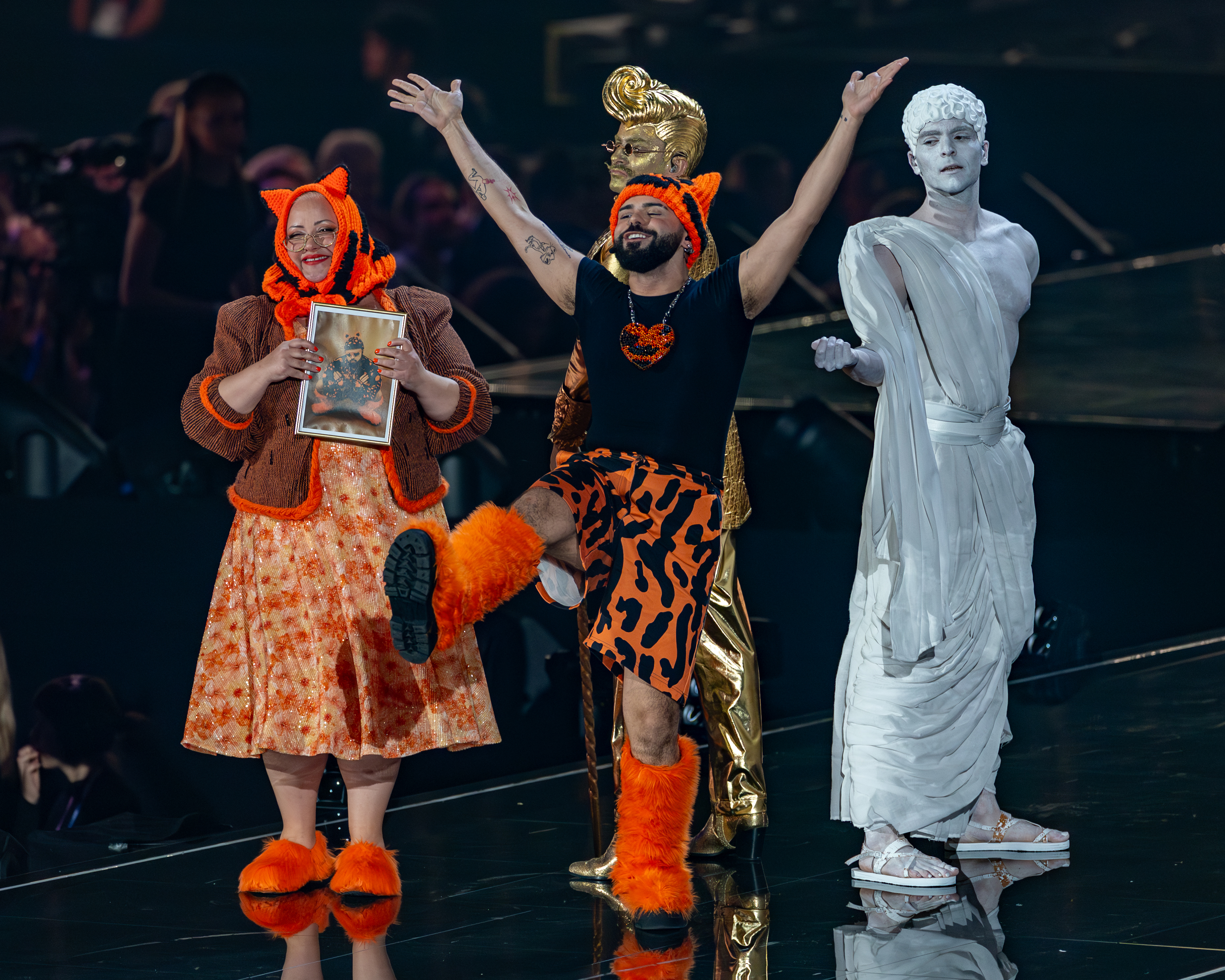
Akylas in Vienna (2026)

== See also ==
- Greece in the Junior Eurovision Song Contest – Junior version of the Eurovision Song Contest.
