= Nikolas Tsakos =

Greek shipowner (born 1963)

Nikolas P. Tsakos
- Born: 1963 (age 62–63); Athens, Greece
- Education: Columbia University (BA); University College London (MA)
- Occupation: Shipowner
- Spouse: Celia Kritharioti
- Children: 3

Nikolas Tsakos (Greek: Νικόλαoς Τσάκος; born 1963) is a Greek shipowner. He is the Founder, President and CEO of Tsakos Energy Navigation (TEN) Limited, a pioneering company which is the longest established Greek shipping public listing. He was the former chairman of the International Association of Independent Tanker Owners from 2014 to 2018.

== Early life ==
Nikolas Tsakos comes from a traditional Chian shipping family and is the son of Panagiotis Tsakos. He has been involved in the maritime industry since 1981 and has spent a total of two years at sea. From 1982 to 1985, he was Shipping and Operations Manager of Tsakos Shipping and Trading Ltd in the US with a focus on the off-shore energy sector in Central America and the U.S. Gulf.

He received his BA Degree in Economics and Political Science from Columbia University in 1985 and his master's degree in Shipping Trade and Finance from the City University Business School in London in 1987. Nikolas P. Tsakos served as an officer in the Hellenic Navy in 1988. He is married to prominent Greek fashion designer Celia Kritharioti and he has three children.

== Career ==
TEN, the company he founded, was firstly listed on the Oslo Bors in 1993 and is listed in the New York Stock Exchange (NYSE symbol: TNP) since March 2002. In December 2015 TEN owned and operated a fleet of 48 product and crude oil tankers on charter to national, major and other independent oil companies and refiners under long, medium and short-term charters, including one 2007-built Liquefied Natural Gas ("LNG") carrier and two 2013-built DP2 shuttle suezmax tankers.

== Distinctions & Awards ==
Nikolas P. Tsakos was awarded in 2015 the Lloyd's List Greek Shipping Newsmaker of the Year award. In 2011, he received an honorary doctorate from the City University Business School, for his pioneering work in the equity financial markets relating to shipping companies. He has also received the following awards: "Lloyd’s List award for the Best Tanker operator in 2006", "EUROPE's 500 award in 2005, "Lloyd's List award to HELMEPAfor achievement for clean and safe seas in 2004" and "Best Maritime Manager of the New Generation" award by the magazine "Business Administration Bulletin" at the Academy of Athens.

In 2026, he was appointed Grand Marshal of the Greek Diaspora parade in New York.

== Philanthropy ==
Nikolas P. Tsakos is the co-founder together with Cpt. Panagiotis N. Tsakos of the Maria Tsakos Foundation (named after his late sister), a charitable organization based in Chios for the well-being and education of young, talented men and women focusing on maritime studies and tradition.

== Membership ==
Nikolas P. Tsakos is an active member of the following organizations:

- Independent Tanker Owners Organization (INTERTANKO), Chairman (2014–Present), Vice Chairman (2012–2014), Executive Committee member (2009–Present), Council member (1992–Present)
- Korean Register (KR) Hellenic Committee, Chairman (2014–Present)
- UK P&I Club, board member (2006–Present)
- American Bureau of Shipping(ABS), council member (2004 – Present)
- Union of Greek Shipowners (UGS), board member (2003–Present)
- Hellenic Marine Environment Protection Association (HELMEPA), ex-Chairman. (2002 - 2006)
- Greek Committee of Det Norske Veritas (DNV), council member (1999–Present)
- Bureau Veritas, council member
- Greek Shipping Co-operation Committee, council member

== See also ==
- Greek shipping
