= Utopian Land =

2016 debut single by Argo

Single by Argo
- Released: 10 March 2016
- Recorded: 2016
- Genre: Greek hip hop
- Songwriter: Vladimiros Sofianidis

Music video
- "Utopian Land" on YouTube

Eurovision Song Contest 2016 entry
- Country: Greece
- Artist: Argo
- Languages: Greek, Pontic Greek, English
- Composer: Vladimiros Sofianidis
- Lyricist: Vladimiros Sofianidis

Finals performance
- Semi-final result: 16th
- Semi-final points: 44

Entry chronology
- ◄ "One Last Breath" (2015)
- "This Is Love" (2017) ►

Official performance video
- "Utopian Land (First Semi-Final) on YouTube

"Utopian Land" is a 2016 song by Greek band Argo. The song represented Greece in the Eurovision Song Contest 2016 held in Stockholm, Sweden after being internally selected by Hellenic Broadcasting Corporation (ERT), Greece's broadcaster for the Eurovision Song Contest. The song would proceed to compete in that year's first semi-final, failing to qualify. The song scored 44 points, well enough for a 16th place position in the semi-final.

== Background ==
The song is inspired as a message about the 2015 European migrant crisis, with the band saying that the song is a call for unity and overcome challenges that people face.

== Composition ==
The song features three languages sung, with Greek, Pontic Greek, and English all being featured within the song. The song is described as a mixture of "funk, R&B and traditional Greek sounds" that keeps a "cheery and soulful" vibe, despite the message of the song according to Wiwibloggs correspondent George Vasileiadis. The song combines hip-hop with Pontic folk music.

== Release ==
On 2 March 2016, Argo would announce that their song for that year's Eurovision Song Contest would release on 10 March 2016. Upon release, a music video was released coinciding with the release of the song.

== Eurovision Song Contest ==
=== Selection ===
On 2 February 2016, ERT announced that they would be selecting Greece's act and song internally. A week later on 9 February 2016, they issued a press release that confirmed the band Argo (formerly known as Europond) as the Greek representatives for the 2016 contest.

=== At Eurovision ===
According to Eurovision rules, all nations with the exceptions of the host country and the "Big Five", consisting of France, Germany, Italy, Spain and the United Kingdom, were required to qualify from one of two semi-finals in order to compete for the final; the top 10 countries from each semi-final progress to the final. The EBU split up the competing countries into six different pots based on voting patterns from previous contests, with the goal of reducing the amount of neighbourly voting. On 25 January 2016, an allocation draw was held which placed each country into one of the two semi-finals and determined which half of the show they would perform in. Greece was placed into the first semi-final, held on 10 May 2016, and was scheduled to perform in the first half of the show.

The Greek performance featured five of the members of Argo performing together on stage with a male dancer; the female members were dressed in white outfits, while the male members were dressed in white shirts and light brown baggy trousers. The performance was choreographed by Maria Lyraraki with lighting design by Konstantinos Garinis and costumes designed by Yiorgos Mesimeris. For the performance, Argo member Elias Kesides was replaced by dancer Vasilis Roxenos.

== Critical reception ==
The song received mostly negative reviews from Eurovision fans and media reviewers. A jury from Eurovision fansite Wiwibloggs had given the song an overall rating of 4.34 out of 10, one of the lowest ratings of all the songs for that year's Eurovision Song Contest. In response, the band would say that "We respect everyone's opinion. We know that not everyone can like our song and we respect that... We are not afraid of the negative comments."

When the song proceeded to fail to qualify, Greek TV channel Star Channel wrote that most Greeks were not surprised since they never really supported its selection in the first place. After continued criticism on ERT director Dionisis Tsaknis, who had chosen the artist, the CEO of ERT, Lambis Tagmatarchis would release a statement defending Tsaknis, saying that it was a collective decision to send them and that Argo deserves "congratulations for their effort".
