= HELMEPA =

The Hellenic Marine Environment Protection Association or HELMEPA (Greek: Ελληνική Ένωση Προστασίας Θαλασσίου Περιβάλλοντος) is Europe's first private sector voluntary marine environment protection association. Politicians and notable Greek business men like Andreas Dracopoulos, Sir Stelios Haji-Ioannou, Stavros G. Livanos and Nikolas Tsakos actively support HELMEPA.

== History ==
The organization was initiated by Greek seafarers and ship owners in 1982, to safeguard the seas from ship-generated pollution. The pioneering, at the time, voluntary commitment was undertaken in Piraeus under the motto “To Save the Seas”. The organizational founders have consistently supported their initiative till date. Throughout the years, it has been awarded by Club UNESCO, the Coastal & Marine Union (EUCC), the Hellenic Institute of Marine Technology, Lloyd's List and many others for its efforts and services.

== Mission ==
HELMEPA supports governments in ratifying and implementing international conventions on the protection of the marine environment. It aims to eliminate ship-generated marine pollution and enhance safety at sea. The Association trains seafarers and executives so that they are aware of safety and the protection of the marine environment". Some of the world's largest cruise lines such as Royal Caribbean, register their vessels with HELMEPA.

== Maritime Training Center ==
The Maritime Sector of HELMEPA, is certified by Germanischer Lloyd and DNV GL, as a “Maritime Training Center for Pollution Prevention, Safety at Sea and Environmental Awareness”.

== HELMEPA Junior ==
HELMEPA has launched public awareness campaigns and several environmental projects for the environmental awareness and education of schoolchildren through HELMEPA Junior. Since 1993, the program gives the opportunity to over 7,000 children throughout Greece, to become voluntarily Members, and be informed on how to take action towards the protection of the marine environment. In 2007, Rodi Kratsa-Tsagaropoulou, the Vice Chairperson of the European Parliament, praised the efforts of the children of CYMEPA, HELMEPA and TURMEPA and awarded them with commemorative diplomas at a ceremony at the office of the European Parliament in Athens.

== Clean Islands ==
The special program aims to prevent pollution and protect the marine environment in islands by informing fishermen, local stakeholders and the wider public about the environmental effects of human carelessness. A protocol based on European and international standards, is used to record litter, in order to help improve scientific knowledge of garbage on coasts and the seabed of island regions in Greece.

== See also ==
- Ocean Conservancy
- European Environment Agency
