= Panagiotis Tsakos =

Greek businessman

Panagiotis N. Tsakos (1936) is a Greek shipowner, entrepreneur, and philanthropist. He is the founder of the Tsakos Group of Companies, one of the most prominent shipping groups in Greece. His son is Nikolas Tsakos.

== Early life and education ==
Panagiotis Tsakos was born in Cardamyla, on the island of Chios, Greece, a region known for its long-standing maritime traditions. He graduated from the Merchant Marine Academy of Cardamyla, beginning a lifelong career at sea and in shipping.

== Career ==
Tsakos began his career as a seafarer and rose through the ranks to become a ship's captain. In the early 1970s, he founded what would become the Tsakos Group, which eventually expanded to include tanker, container, and bulk carrier operations In 1975, Tsakos acquired the shipyards of Montevideo. In December 2022, his affiliated company announced the closure of its facilities.

Over the decades, the Tsakos Group has grown into a diversified enterprise with offices in Athens, Montevideo, and other maritime hubs. Its publicly listed company, Tsakos Energy Navigation (TEN), trades on the New York Stock Exchange and operates a modern fleet of tankers.

== Philanthropy and Public Service ==
Tsakos is also known for his philanthropic work through the Maria Tsakos Foundation – International Center of Maritime Research and Tradition, established in memory of his late daughter. The foundation supports maritime education, Greek cultural preservation, and scholarships for young seafarers.

He has played an active role in promoting maritime education in Greece and Latin America, particularly in Uruguay, where the foundation has been active since the 1970s.

== Awards and recognition ==
Panagiotis Tsakos has received multiple awards in recognition of his services to the shipping industry and philanthropy from maritime institutions.

In 2009, the Emperor of Japan awarded Panagiotis Tsakos the Order of the Rising Sun in recognition of his contribution to strengthening Greek–Japanese relations in the maritime sector and his efforts in promoting cooperation between Japan and Greece. In 2015, he was awarded Seatrade Lifetime Achievement Award and the Commander Cross of the Order of the Phoenix by the President of the Hellenic Republic in 2014.

In 2018 he was awarded a Doctor of Science (Honoris Causa) in recognition of his outstanding leadership and his unwavering commitment to supporting the work of the Centre for Shipping, Trade and Finance at Cass Business School.

On May 16, 2019, he was awarded an Honorary Doctorate by the Department of International and European Studies of the University of Macedonia.

On November 18, 2023, he was awarded the title of Honorary Doctor by the School of Humanities of the Hellenic Open University.

In December 2010, Lloyd’s List ranked him 84th among Greek maritime leaders.
