= Polina (Greek singer) =

Greek singer

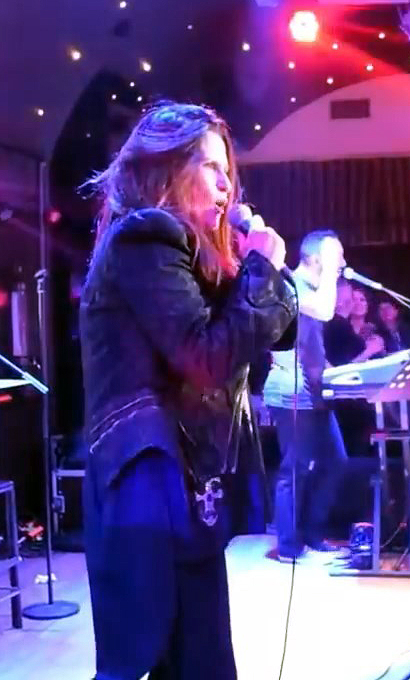
- Photo of Polina performing on stage in 2018

Background information
- Born: Polina Paraskevi Misailidou; 28 July 1956 (age 70); Nea Smyrni, Athens, Greece
- Origin: Thessaloniki, Greece
- Genres: Pop
- Occupation: Singer
- Years active: 1977–present
- Label: Sony Music
- Website: https://polina93.webnode.gr

Polina Paraskevi Misailidou (Greek: Πωλίνα Παρασκευή Μισαηλίδου; born 28 July 1956) is a Greek singer, who is better known simply as Polina.

== Biography ==
Polina was born and raised in Nea Smyrni, a suburb in southern Athens. She started her career in 1977 singing the song "Lives" at the Thessaloniki Song Festival. In 1979, Polina appeared at the Eurovision Song Contest as a backup singer to Elpida as she performed the entry "Sokrati".

However, that was her only time at Eurovision. She was picked in the 1986 national selection to represent Greece at Eurovision Song Contest 1986 in Bergen, Norway, but Ellinikí Radiofonía Tileórasi, Greece's national broadcaster, pulled out of the contest unexpectedly. Polina stated that it was due to political troubles in Greece at the time, but she noted that a Eurovision website had learned that the real reason was that the contest was to be held the night before Orthodox Easter. Had she performed, she would have appeared eighteenth and she would have performed the song "Wagon-lit".

== See also ==
- Greece in the Eurovision Song Contest
