= International Association of Independent Tanker Owners =

The International Association of Independent Tanker Owners (INTERTANKO) is a membership association for owners of independent tankers throughout the world. The Association was formed in its present guise in Oslo in 1970 to speak out for those independent tanker owners, i.e. non-oil companies and non-state controlled tanker owners, for the safe shipping of oil and chemicals and to act as a forum for marine policy creation. Membership is open to those owners and operators of oil, gas and chemical tankers who fulfil the Association's membership criteria. Independent owners operate a huge percentage of the world's tanker fleet and the vast majority are INTERTANKO Members.

As of January 2025, the organisation had 180 full members, whose combined fleet comprises some 3,809 tankers totalling over 355 million dwt. INTERTANKO's Associate Membership, i.e. companies with an interest in shipping of oil and chemicals but who do not own or operate tankers, stands at some 220 companies.

INTERTANKO is responsible for the compilation of many respected marine industry books and publications. The Witherby Publishing Group are the official distributors of INTERTANKO's retail publications. INTERTANKO's central offices are in Oslo, Norway and in London, with branches in Athens, Greece, Singapore and Arlington, VA.

The current Managing Director of INTERTANKO is Tim Wilkins.
