= Argo (band) =

Greek band

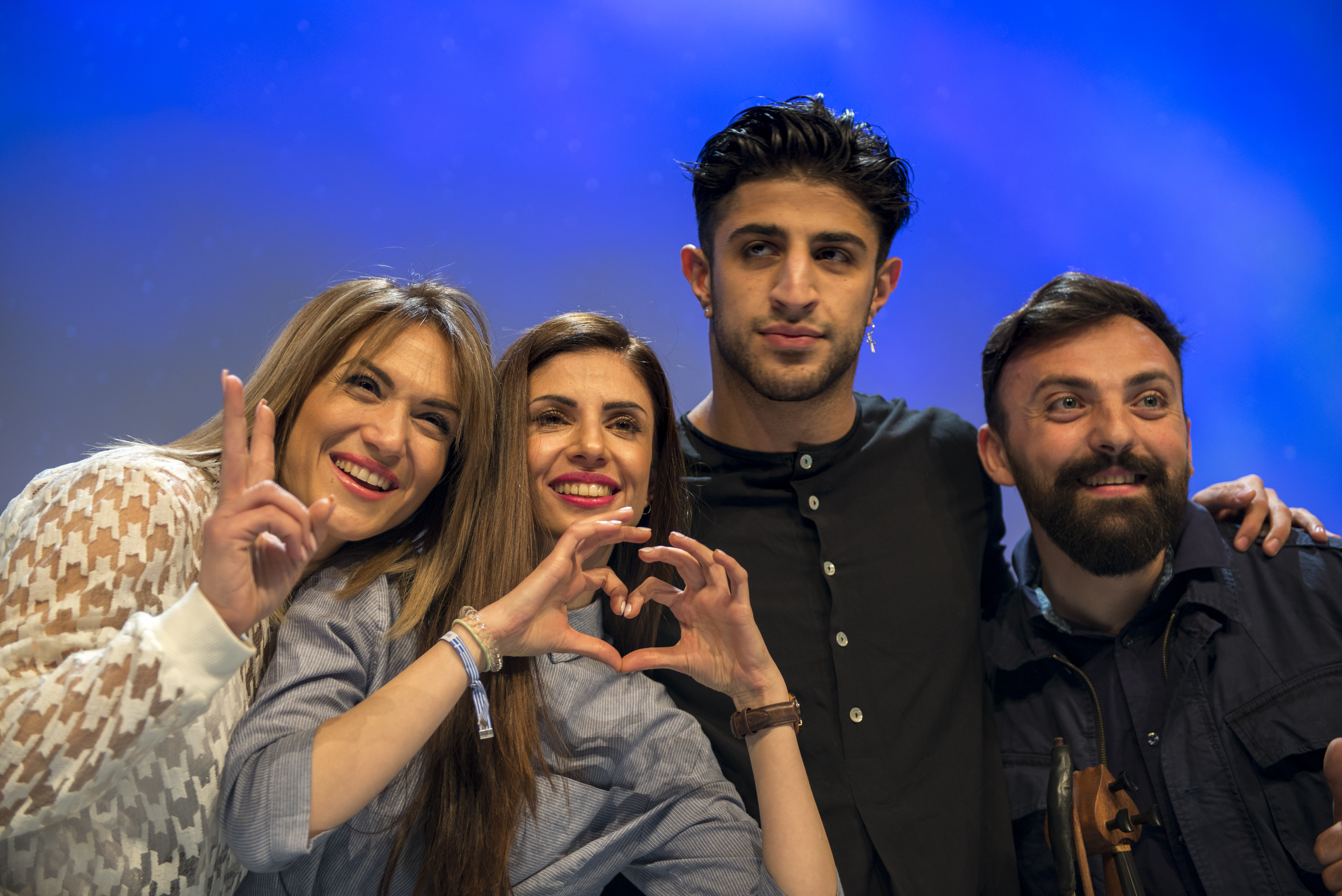
- Argo at the Eurovision Song Contest 2016 in Stockholm.

Background information
- Origin: Thessaloniki, Greece
- Genres: Folk, Pontic Music, Balkan Music
- Years active: 2006 - present
- Members: Christina Lachana; Maria Venetikidou; Vladimiros Sofianidis; Kostas Topouzis; Ilias Kesidis; Alekos Papadopoulos

Argo is a Greek band that represented Greece in the Eurovision Song Contest 2016 in Stockholm, Sweden, singing "Utopian Land". Their previous name was Europond but they changed it for their participation in the Eurovision Song Contest 2016. They performed "Utopian Land" on the first semi final of Eurovision on May 10, 2016 but failed to qualify to the May 14 final. This was the first time since the semi finals were introduced in 2004 that Greece had failed to reach the final.

The band has six members: Christina Lachana (Χριστίνα Λαχανά) (vocals), Maria Venetikidou (Μαρία Βενετικίδου) (backing vocals), Vladimiros Sofianidis (Βλαδίμηρος Σοφιανίδης) (vocals), Kostas Topouzis (Κώστας Τοπούζης) (Pontian lyra), Ilias Kesidis (Ηλίας Κεσίδης) (backing vocals, percussion) and Alekos Papadopoulos (Αλέκος Παπαδόπουλος) (davul).

Awards and achievements
Preceded by Maria Elena Kyriakou with "One Last Breath"	Greece in the Eurovision Song Contest; 2016	Succeeded by Demy with "This Is Love"
