= Celia Kritharioti =

Greek fashion designer

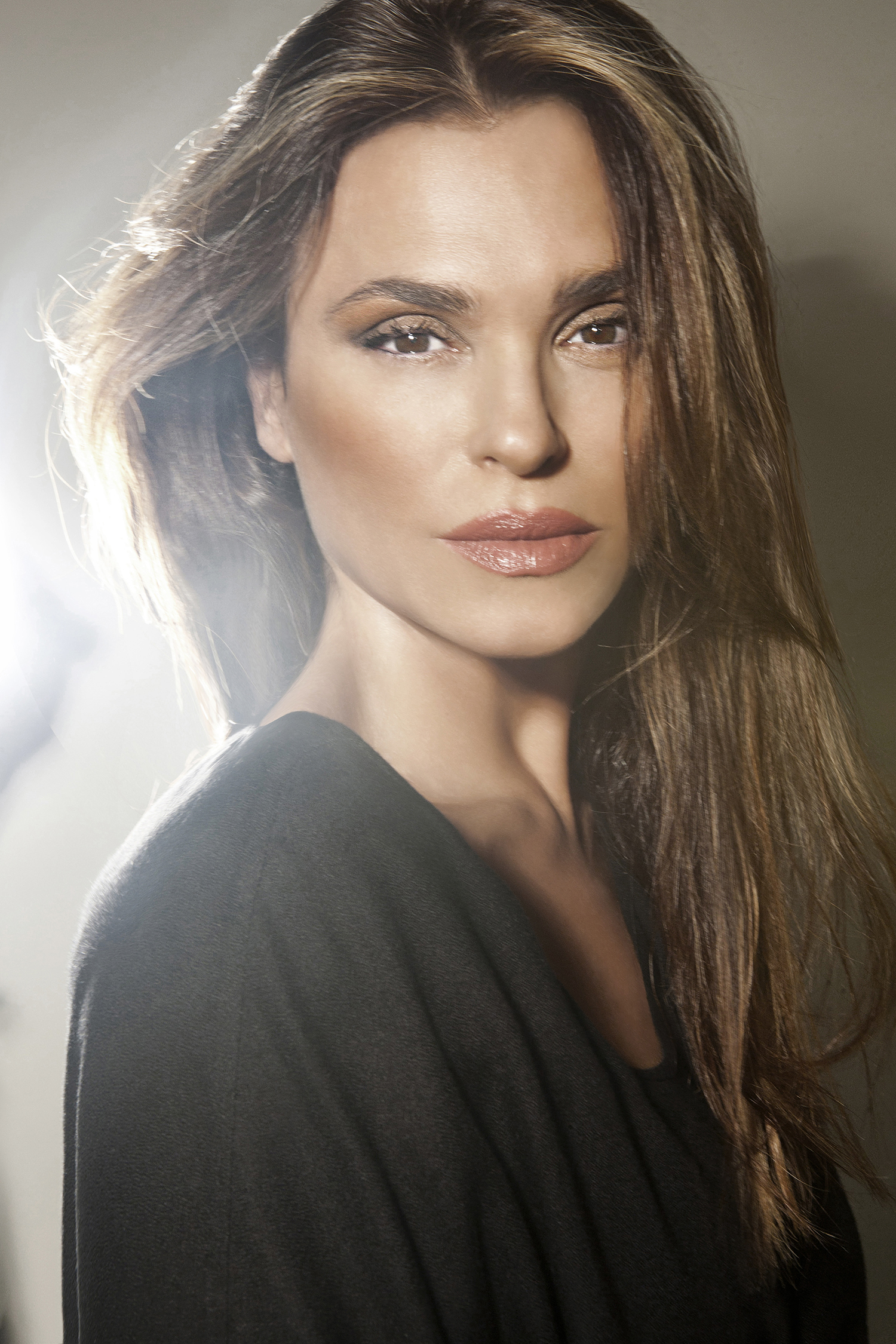
- Born: June 7, 1968 (age 58); Athens, Greece
- Occupation: Fashion designer
- Spouse: Nikolas Tsakos
- Children: 3

Celia Kritharioti (Greek: Σίλια Κριθαριώτη) is a Greek fashion designer. She is the owner of one of the oldest Greek fashion houses, established in 1906.

== Personal life ==
Kritharioti is married to Greek shipowner Nikolas Tsakos and has three children, two of which are models in her company. She graduated from Pierce - The American College of Greece

== Career ==
Kritharioti is pinpointed in UK Vanity Fair as one of six couturiers to watch worldwide: "Beautifully feminine and embellished concoctions from this couturier to the stars", noted Annabel Davison, Senior Editor at Vanity Fair on Jewellery and Couture. Supporters include Jennifer Lopez, Lady Gaga, Paula Patton, Kim Kardashian, Kelly Rutherford, Miranda Lambert, Samantha Barks, Maria Menounos, Giuliana Rancic, Gemma Arterton. Gwyneth Paltrow was photographed for Vogue Mexico in Celia Kritharioti Haute Couture.

Natalia Vodianova, Naomi Campbell, Iman, Gisele Bündchen, Laetitia Casta, Claudia Schiffer, Elle Macpherson and Karolína Kurková are top models who have worked with her. She was appointed to design the "Olympic Air personnel costumes". Kritharioti designed the costumes of "Romeo & Juliet" and "Swan Lake" ballets for the Greek National Opera presented at the Megaron venue in Athens.

Kritharioti presents an Haute Couture Collection (annually), a Bridal Collection (annually), the 5226 Prêt-à-Porter collection (twice a year) and the 5226 Princess Collection for children (twice a year). She also designs sunglasses, jewelry and accessories.

In 2024, she designed the wedding dress for Princess Theodora of Greece and Denmark.

== Sources ==
- "Celia: celiakritharioti.gr". Archived from the original on 2017-02-12.
- "The red carpet is a runway for unknown designers". Los Angeles Times. Archived from the original on 2015-12-02.
- "5226 - Celia Kritharioti Eshop". celiakrithariotieshop.gr.
- "Celia Kritharioti". weRpress. 9 February 2015.
- "Kim Kardashian in Celia Kritharioti at Elton John party". Harper's BAZAAR. Archived from the original on 2015-03-27.
