= Greece in the Eurovision Song Contest 2020 =

- Eurovision Song Contest 2020
- Participating broadcaster: Hellenic Broadcasting Corporation (ERT)
- Country: Greece
- Selection process: Internal selection
- Announcement date: Artist: 3 February 2020; Song: 1 March 2020

Competing entry
- Song: "Supergirl"
- Artist: Stefania
- Songwriters: Dimitris Kontopoulos; Arcade (Pavlos Manolis, Anastasios Rammos, Diverno, Gabriel Russell); Sharon Vaughn

Placement
- Final result: Contest cancelled

Participation chronology

Greece was set to be represented at the Eurovision Song Contest 2020 with the song "Supergirl", written by Dimitris Kontopoulos, Sharon Vaughn, Pavlos Manolis, Anastasios Rammos, Diverno, and Gabriel Russell, and performed by Stefania. The Greek participating broadcaster, the Hellenic Broadcasting Corporation (ERT), internally selected its entry for the contest. Due to the 2020 coronavirus pandemic in Europe, the contest was cancelled in mid-March. ERT stated Stefania would instead represent Greece at the 2021 contest.

== Background ==
Prior to the 2020 contest, Greece had participated in the Eurovision Song Contest forty times since their debut in 1974. They have won the contest once, in 2005 with the song "My Number One" performed by Helena Paparizou. Following the introduction of semi-finals for the 2004 contest, Greece managed to qualify for the final with each of their entries for several years. Between 2004 and 2013, they achieved nine top ten placements in the final. To this point, in 2016 with "Utopian Land" by Argo, they failed to qualify from the semi-finals for the first time ever, being absent from the final for the first time since 2000, marking their worst result at the contest. In 2018, they failed to qualify for the second time with "Oniro mou" by Yianna Terzi finishing 14th in the semi-final. Greece returned to the final in 2019 with "Better Love" by Katerine Duska, placing 21st with 74 points.

As part of its duties as participating broadcaster, the Hellenic Broadcasting Corporation (ERT) organises the selection of its entry in the Eurovision Song Contest and broadcasts the event in the country. ERT predecessor, National Radio Television Foundation (EIRT) debuted in the contest in 1974 and then ERT participated from 1975 until 2013, when the broadcaster was shut down by a government directive. It was replaced firstly with the interim Dimosia Tileorasi (DT) and then later by New Hellenic Radio, Internet and Television (NERIT). On 28 April 2015, a legislative proposal that resulted in the renaming of NERIT to ERT was approved and signed into law by the Hellenic Parliament; ERT began broadcasting once again on 11 June 2015. The new ERT then confirmed its intentions to participate at the 2016 contest on 28 August 2015.

The Greek broadcaster has used various methods to select its entry in the past, such as internal selections and televised national finals to choose the performer, song or both to compete at Eurovision. In early September 2019, Maria Koufopoulou, ERT's director of international relations, confirmed that ERT would participate in the 2020 contest. She also stated that they were still evaluating how to select the entry and were in discussions with local fan clubs to solicit ideas.

== Before Eurovision ==
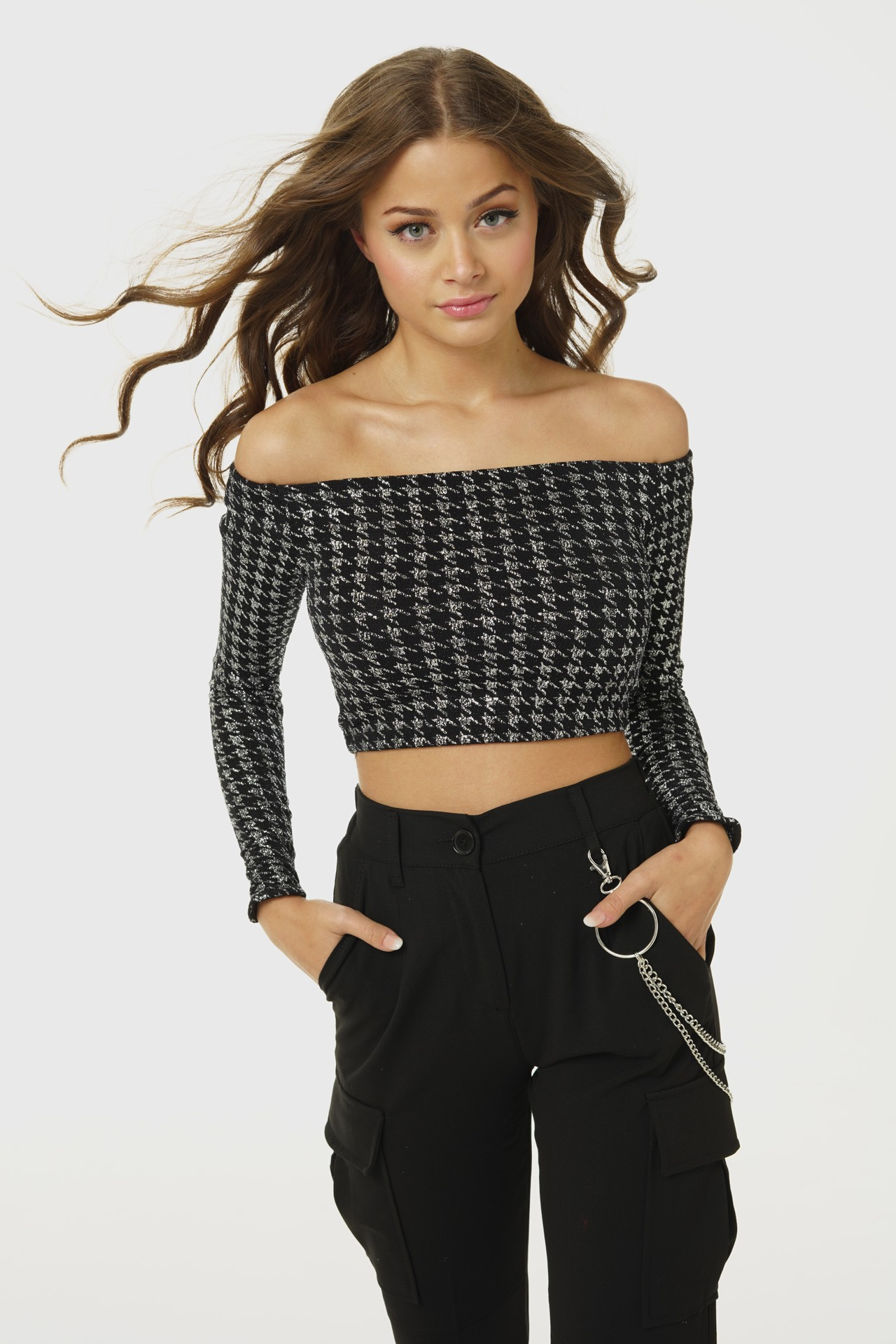
Greek-Dutch performer Stefania was selected as the entrant for Greece.

=== Internal selection ===
Similar to 2019, ERT announced that it would select its entry internally. On 15 January, it revealed the names of the people who would comprise the jury panel involved with the selection of the entrant. The jury consisted of music composer and ERT board member Dimitris Papadimitriou, music producer Petros Adam, Yiorgos Markakis, music producer Yiannis Petridis, and ERT's director of international relations Maria Koufopoulou.

Prior to the official announcement of the performer, Star Channel reported that seven acts had been shortlisted to represent Greece in Rotterdam, including Irini Papadopoulou, Stefania, Ian Stratis, and the boy band One. They reported that the jury would listen to the songs submitted by each act before selecting their preferred entry. On 3 February 2020 during an ERT newscast, Stefania was announced as the Greek entrant with the song "Supergirl". The song was written by Dimitris Kontopoulos, Sharon Vaughn, and the production team Arcade (Pavlos Manolis, Anastasios Rammos, Diverno, Gabriel Russell). Born in the Netherlands to a family with Greek ancestry, Stefania had previously represented the Netherlands in Junior Eurovision 2016 as part of the group Kisses, placing eighth. The song and accompanying music video were released the following month on 1 March 2020, during the premiere of ERT's new program Eurovision Song Contest - Final Countdown, hosted by Mihalis Marinos. The music video was directed by Konstantinos Karydas.

== At Eurovision ==
The Eurovision Song Contest 2020 was originally scheduled to take place at Rotterdam Ahoy in Rotterdam, Netherlands and consist of two semi-finals on 12 and 14 May, and a final on 16 May 2020. According to Eurovision rules, each country, except the host nation and the "Big Five" (France, Germany, Italy, Spain and the United Kingdom), would have been required to qualify from one of two semi-finals to compete for the final; the top ten countries from each semi-final would have progressed to the final. On 28 January 2020, the allocation draw was held at Rotterdam City Hall, placing Greece into the first half of the second semi-final. Fokas Evangelinos was hired to organise the staging and choreography for the performance. However, due to the COVID-19 pandemic in Europe, the contest was cancelled on 18 March 2020. The EBU announced soon after that entries intended for 2020 would not be eligible for the following year, though each broadcaster would be able to send either their 2020 representative or a new one. ERT responded that its intention was to continue its cooperation with Stefania for the next contest in 2021.

=== Alternative song contests ===
Some of the broadcasters scheduled to take part in the Eurovision Song Contest 2020 organised alternative competitions. Austria's ORF broadcast Der kleine Song Contest in April 2020, which saw every entry being assigned to one of three semi-finals. A jury consisting of ten singers that had represented Austria at Eurovision before was hired to rank each song; the best-placed entry in each semi-final advanced to the final round. In the third semi-final on 18 April, Greece placed seventh in a field of 13 participants, achieving 51 points. Greece's song also partook in Sveriges Television's Sveriges 12:a in May, and was qualified for the final round, finishing 15th.
