= What Love Is (song) =

Estonian entry in the Eurovision Song Contest 2020

Single by Uku Suviste
- Released: 3 December 2019
- Genre: Pop, musical theatre
- Length: 3:00
- Label: DTC Music
- Songwriters: Uku Suviste; Sharon Vaughn
- Producer: Dimitris Kontopoulos

Uku Suviste singles chronology
"Pretty Little Liar" (2019)	"What Love Is" (2019)	"Müüdud ja Pakitud" (2020)

Eurovision Song Contest 2020 entry
- Country: Estonia
- Artist: Uku Suviste
- Language: English
- Composers: Uku Suviste; Sharon Vaughn
- Lyricists: Uku Suviste; Sharon Vaughn

Finals performance
- Semi-final result: Contest cancelled

Entry chronology
- ◄ "Storm" (2019)
- "The Lucky One" (2021) ►

"What Love Is" is a song by Uku Suviste that was to represent Estonia in the Eurovision Song Contest 2020 in Rotterdam, The Netherlands, before the cancellation of the event due to the Coronavirus Pandemic. It was written by Suviste and Sharon Vaughn. During the live performance at Eesti Laul, Uku was accompanied by five backing singers off-stage, Kaire Vilgats, Dagmar Oja, Kaarel Orumägi, Raimondo Laikre and Scott Murro.

== Critical reception ==
The song received mixed reviews from critics. Whilst the fan website Wiwibloggs had the song as their least favorite entry out of the 41, it was with an average of 4.1 out of 10 from the 22 reviewers. Panel member Deban Aderimi said of the song: "Uku builds a story on stage, whilst managing to keep the viewer transfixed. This isn’t an easy thing to do. Yes, elements of this are dated, and the song in general is somewhat needlessly theatrical. However, let’s not lose sight of his compelling vocals and the undeniable hook here. “What Love Is” has a charging melody that will leave you yearning for another reprise.", giving it 6/10, but other members of the channel derided it as "clichéd" and "clunky", and it received reviews ranging from 1 to 7.

On the website ESCXtra, the song was rated 34th of the 41 entries, with 93 points from the 19 reviewers, including three of them giving it the minimum 1 and one giving it the maximum 12. Praises and criticisms leveled at the song were similar to those from the critics of Wiwibloggs.

Some of the broadcasters scheduled to take part in the Eurovision Song Contest 2020 have organised alternative competitions. Austria's ORF aired Der kleine Song Contest in April 2020, which saw every entry being assigned to one of three semi-finals. A jury consisting of ten singers that had represented Austria at Eurovision before was hired to rank each song; the best-placed in each semi-final advanced to the final round. In the third semi-final on 18 April, "What Love Is" placed ninth in a field of 13 participants, achieving 48 points. The song is also partook in Sveriges Television's Sveriges 12:a in May, but it was one of 11 entries in the show to not place in either the jury or televote top 10 after being put through the first round.

== Eurovision Song Contest ==
The song was scheduled to represent Estonia in the Eurovision Song Contest 2020, after Uku Suviste was selected through Eesti Laul 2020, the music competition that selects Estonia's entries for the Eurovision Song Contest. Estonia was scheduled to perform in the first half of the second semi-final at Eurovision, to be held on 14 May 2020, before the contest was canceled due to the COVID-19 pandemic. Suviste has confirmed he intends to compete in Eesti Laul 2021 and has been given a pass to the semi-finals, but will have to compete with a new song.

In the Eurovision Song Celebration YouTube broadcast in the place of Semi Final 2, it was revealed he would have performed second, after Greece's entry, which Vaughn was also part of the writing team of, and before Austria's.

== Charts ==
Chart performance
Chart (2020)	Peak position
Estonia (Eesti Tipp-40)	14
Estonia Domestic (Eesti Tipp-40)	4
