= Estonia in the Eurovision Song Contest 2020 =

- Eurovision Song Contest 2020
- Participating broadcaster: Eesti Rahvusringhääling (ERR)
- Country: Estonia
- Selection process: Eesti Laul 2020
- Selection date: 29 February 2020

Competing entry
- Song: "What Love Is"
- Artist: Uku Suviste
- Songwriters: Uku Suviste; Sharon Vaughn

Placement
- Final result: Contest cancelled

Participation chronology

Estonia was set to be represented at the Eurovision Song Contest 2020 with the song "What Love Is" written by Uku Suviste and Sharon Vaughn. The song was performed by Uku Suviste. The Estonian broadcaster Eesti Rahvusringhääling (ERR) organised the national final Eesti Laul 2020 in order to select the Estonian entry for the 2020 contest in Rotterdam, Netherlands. The national final consisted of three shows: two semi-finals and a final. Twelve songs competed in each semi-final and six from each semi-final as determined by a jury panel and public vote qualified to the final. In the final, the winner was selected over two rounds of voting. In the first round, a jury panel and a public vote selected the top three to qualify to the superfinal. In the superfinal, "What Love Is" performed by Uku Suviste was selected as the winner entirely by a public vote.

Estonia was drawn to compete in the second semi-final of the Eurovision Song Contest which took place on 14 May 2020. However, the contest was cancelled due to the COVID-19 pandemic.

== Background ==
Prior to the 2020 Contest, Estonia had participated in the Eurovision Song Contest twenty-five times since its first entry in 1994, winning the contest on one occasion in 2001 with the song "Everybody" performed by Tanel Padar, Dave Benton and 2XL. Following the introduction of semi-finals for the 2004, Estonia has, to this point, managed to qualify to the final on seven occasions. In 2019, "Storm" performed by Victor Crone managed to qualify Estonia to the final where the song placed twentieth.

The Estonian national broadcaster, Eesti Rahvusringhääling (ERR), broadcasts the event within Estonia and organises the selection process for the nation's entry. ERR confirmed Estonia's participation at the 2020 Eurovision Song Contest on 6 August 2019. Since their debut, the Estonian broadcaster has organised national finals that feature a competition among multiple artists and songs in order to select Estonia's entry for the Eurovision Song Contest. The Eesti Laul competition has been organised since 2009 in order to select Estonia's entry and on 30 August 2019, ERR announced the organisation of Eesti Laul 2020 in order to select the nation's 2020 entry.

== Before Eurovision ==
=== Eesti Laul 2020 ===
Eesti Laul 2020 was the twelfth edition of the Estonian national selection Eesti Laul, which selected Estonia's entry for the Eurovision Song Contest 2020. The competition consisted of twenty-four entries competing in two semi-finals on 13 and 15 February 2020 leading to a twelve-song final on 29 February 2020. All three shows were hosted by Karl-Erik Taukar and Tõnis Niinemets and broadcast on Eesti Televisioon (ETV), on ETV+ with Russian commentary, via radio on Raadio 2 with commentary by Erik Morna, Margus Kamlat, Robin Juhkental and Kristo Rajasaare as well as streamed online at the broadcaster's official website err.ee.

==== Format ====
The format of the competition included two semi-finals on 13 and 15 February 2020 and a final on 29 February 2020. Twelve songs competed in each semi-final and the top six from each semi-final qualified to complete the twelve song lineup in the final. The results of the semi-finals was determined by the 50/50 combination of votes from a professional jury and public televoting for the first four qualifiers and a second round of public televoting for the fifth and sixth qualifiers. The winning song in the final was selected over two rounds of voting: the first round results selected the top three songs via the 50/50 combination of jury and public voting, while the second round (superfinal) determined the winner solely by public televoting. In addition to winning the right to represent Estonia at the 2020 Eurovision Song Contest, the winning songwriters and producers were also awarded monetary prizes of €3,000 and €1,000, respectively. The Estonian Authors' Society and Estonian Performers Association also awarded a monetary prize of €1,000 to the top three entries.

==== Competing entries ====
On 1 September 2019, ERR opened the submission period for artists and composers to submit their entries up until 6 November 2019 through an online upload platform. Each artist and songwriter was only able to submit a maximum of five entries. Foreign collaborations were allowed as long as 50% of the songwriters were Estonian. A fee was also imposed on songs being submitted to the competition, with €25 for songs in the Estonian language and €50 for songs in other languages. 178 submissions were received by the deadline. A 14-member jury panel selected 24 semi-finalists from the submissions and the selected songs were announced during the ETV entertainment program Ringvaade on 13 and 14 November 2019. The selection jury consisted of Andres Puusepp (DJ), Anu Varusk (Warner Music Baltics regional marketing manager), Birgit Sarrap (singer), Daniel Levi (singer), Eda-Ines Etti (singer), Hendrik Sal-Saller (musician), Jüri Makarov (Rock Summer organiser), Kaupo Karelson (television producer), Lauri Hermann (Raadio Elmar presenter), Madis Aesma (musician), Maiken (singer), Owe Petersell (Raadio Elmar chief editor), Sten Teppan (Vikerradio music editor) and Vaido Pannel (Raadio Sky+ music editor).

Among the competing artists were previous Eurovision Song Contest entrants Laura, who represented Estonia in 2005 as part of the group Suntribe and in 2017 together with Koit Toome, and Stig Rästa (as member of Traffic), who represented Estonia in 2015 with Elina Born. Anett Kulbin, Egert Milder, Inga, Inger, Jennifer Cohen, Kruuv, Laura Prits (lead singer of Ziggy Wild), Mariliis Jõgeva, Rasmus Rändvee, Stefan, Synne Valtri, Traffic and Violina have all competed in previous editions of Eesti Laul. Little Mess' entry was written by Tanja, who represented Estonia in 2014, and Traffic's entry was written by Victor Crone, who represented Estonia in 2019.

Artist	Song	Songwriter(s)
Anett and Fredi	"Write About Me"	Frederik Küüts, Anett Kulbin
Egert Milder	"Georgia (On My Mind)"	Kaspar Kalluste, Matteo Capreoli, Egert Milder
German and Violina	"Heart Winder"	Timo Vendt, Ebbe Ravn, Carine-Jessica Kostla, Liis-Marii Vendt
Inga	"Right Time"	Peter Põder, Allan Kasuk, Raul Krebs, Inga Tislar
Inger	"Only Dream"	Inger Fridolin, Karl-Ander Reismann
Jaagup Tuisk	"Beautiful Lie"	Jaagup Tuisk
Janet	"Hingelind"	Marek Rosenberg, Lauri Lembinen, Kadri Lepik, Janet Vavilov
Jennifer Cohen	"Ping Pong"	Jennifer Cohen, Luisa Lõhmus
Kruuv	"Leelo"	Allan Kasuk
Laura	"Break Me"	Janne Hyöty, Jessica Hyöty, Laura Põldvere
Little Mess	"Without a Reason"	Ebbe Ravn, Timo Vendt, Mihkel Mattisen, Tanja Mihhailova-Saar
Mariliis Jõgeva	"Unistustes"	Mariliis Jõgeva, Oliver Mazurtšak
Merilin Mälk	"Miljon sammu"	Jonas Olsson, Neea Jokinen, Jana Hallas, Merilin Mälk
Rasmus Rändvee	"Young"	Karl-Ander Reismann, Rasmus Rändvee
Renate	"Videomäng"	Renate Saluste
Revals	"Kirjutan romaani"	Jaanus Saago
Shira	"Out in Space"	Marika Rodionova, Karl-Ander Reismann
Stefan	"By My Side"	Karl-Ander Reismann, Stefan Airapetjan
Synne Valtri feat. Väliharf	"Majakad"	Synne Valtri, Jaanus Viskar, Toomas Laur, Gert Gregor Källo, Aapo Ilves
Traffic	"Üks kord veel"	Victor Crone, Fred Krieger, Vallo Kikas, Stig Rästa
Uku Suviste	"What Love Is"	Uku Suviste, Sharon Vaughn
Uudo Sepp	"I'm Sorry. I Messed Up"	Andrei Zevakin
Viinerid	"Kapa Kohi-LA"	Peter Põder, Hardo Hansar, Oliver Saare, Martti Kask
Ziggy Wild	"Lean on Me"	Laura Prits, Valdur Viiklepp, Sander Nõmmistu, Henri-Hannes Sell

==== Semi-finals ====
The two semi-finals took place on 13 and 15 February 2020 at the University of Tartu Sports Hall in Tartu. In each semi-final twelve songs competed for the first four spots in the final with the outcome decided upon by the combination of the votes from a jury panel and a public televote which registered 12,421 votes in the first semi-final and 20,011 votes in the second semi-final; the remaining two qualifiers were decided by an additional televote between the remaining non-qualifiers which registered 5,452 votes in the first semi-final and 9,477 votes in the second semi-final. In addition to the performances of the competing entries, Ines, who represented Estonia in the Eurovision Song Contest 2000, and the group 5miinust performed as the interval act in the first semi-final, while the band Black Velvet performed as the interval act in the second semi-final. The jury panel that voted in the semi-finals consisted of Lenna Kuurma, Mari-Liis Männik, Kristel Aaslaid, Priit Pajusaar, Rolf Roosalu, Kristjan Hirmo, Tanel Padar, Jalmar Vabarna and Paul Oja.

First round (jury and televote) qualifier Second round (televote-only) qualifier

Semi-final 1 (First round) – 13 February 2020
R/O	Artist	Song	Jury		Televote		Total	Place
R/O	Artist	Song	Votes	Points	Votes	Points	Total	Place
1	Rasmus Rändvee	"Young"	66	7	1,187	6	13	4
2	Kruuv	"Leelo"	27	3	495	0	3	11
3	Stefan	"By My Side"	72	8	1,036	5	13	5
4	Inga	"Right Time"	59	6	661	1	7	9
5	Anett and Fredi	"Write About Me"	81	12	1,238	7	19	1
6	Revals	"Kirjutan romaani"	46	5	734	2	7	8
7	Renate	"Videomäng"	0	0	964	4	4	10
8	Laura	"Break Me"	44	4	915	3	7	7
9	Little Mess	"Without a Reason"	12	0	1,412	10	10	6
10	Egert Milder	"Georgia (On My Mind)"	73	10	1,317	8	18	2
11	Jennifer Cohen	"Ping Pong"	15	1	601	0	1	12
12	Synne Valtri feat. Väliharf	"Majakad"	27	2	1,861	12	14	3

Semi-final 1 (Second round) – 13 February 2020
Artist	Song	Televote	Place
Kruuv	"Leelo"	398	8
Inga	"Right Time"	538	4
Jennifer Cohen	"Ping Pong"	423	6
Laura	"Break Me"	610	2
Little Mess	"Without a Reason"	404	7
Renate	"Videomäng"	599	3
Revals	"Kirjutan romaani"	446	5
Stefan	"By My Side"	2,034	1

Semi-final 2 (First round) – 15 February 2020
R/O	Artist	Song	Jury		Televote		Total	Place
R/O	Artist	Song	Votes	Points	Votes	Points	Total	Place
1	Viinerid	"Kapa Kohi-LA"	8	0	1,307	4	4	10
2	Janet	"Hingelind"	4	0	456	0	0	12
3	Uku Suviste	"What Love Is"	52	6	5,570	12	18	2
4	Inger	"Only Dream"	57	8	1,967	7	15	4
5	Merilin Mälk	"Miljon sammu"	20	2	1,021	3	5	9
6	German and Violina	"Heart Winder"	15	1	623	0	1	11
7	Jaagup Tuisk	"Beautiful Lie"	108	12	2,033	8	20	1
8	Ziggy Wild	"Lean on Me"	52	5	933	2	7	8
9	Uudo Sepp	"I'm Sorry. I Messed Up"	57	7	826	1	8	7
10	Traffic	"Üks kord veel"	69	10	1,522	6	16	3
11	Shira	"Out in Space"	47	4	1,400	5	9	6
12	Mariliis Jõgeva	"Unistustes"	33	3	2,353	10	13	5

Semi-final 2 (Second round) – 15 February 2020
Artist	Song	Televote	Place
German and Violina	"Heart Winder"	1,214	5
Janet	"Hingelind"	188	8
Mariliis Jõgeva	"Unistustes"	516	7
Merilin Mälk	"Miljon sammu"	1,244	4
Shira	"Out in Space"	1,947	1
Uudo Sepp	"I'm Sorry. I Messed Up"	1,760	2
Viinerid	"Kapa Kohi-LA"	1,710	3
Ziggy Wild	"Lean on Me"	898	6

==== Final ====
The final took place on 29 February 2020 at the Saku Suurhall in Tallinn. The six entries that qualified from each of the two preceding semi-finals, all together twelve songs, competed during the show. The winner was selected over two rounds of voting. In the first round, an international jury (50%) and public televote (50%) determined the top three entries to proceed to the superfinal. The public vote in the first round registered 47,082 votes. In the superfinal, "What Love Is" performed by Uku Suviste was selected as the winner entirely by a public televote. The public televote in the superfinal registered 49,216 votes. In addition to the performances of the competing entries, Tanel Padar, who represented Estonia in the Eurovision Song Contest 2001, Victor Crone, who represented Estonia in the Eurovision Song Contest 2019, the group Púr Múdd, and singers Anne Veski and Karl-Erik Taukar performed as the interval acts. The international jury panel that voted in the first round of the final consisted of Mads Enggaard (Dansk Melodi Grand Prix producer), Prince Charles Alexander (American producer), Sylvia Massy (American producer), Felix Bergsson (Icelandic Eurovision Head of Delegation), Daniel Cantor (American producer), Fredi Lunden (Warner Music Finland artist manager), Kazka (Ukrainian band), Kimbra (New Zealand singer and producer) and Brian Henry (British keyboardist).

Final – 29 February 2020
R/O	Artist	Song	Jury		Televote		Total	Place
R/O	Artist	Song	Votes	Points	Votes	Points	Total	Place
1	Inger	"Only Dream"	32	2	2,762	5	7	8
2	Rasmus Rändvee	"Young"	23	1	999	0	1	12
3	Stefan	"By My Side"	48	6	1,948	2	8	7
4	Synne Valtri feat. Väliharf	"Majakad"	19	0	2,758	4	4	9
5	Uudo Sepp	"I'm Sorry. I Messed Up"	38	3	991	0	3	10
6	Uku Suviste	"What Love Is"	56	7	16,880	12	19	2
7	Shira	"Out in Space"	58	8	2,236	3	11	6
8	Anett and Fredi	"Write About Me"	87	12	3,469	7	19	3
9	Jaagup Tuisk	"Beautiful Lie"	65	10	5,259	10	20	1
10	Traffic	"Üks kord veel"	46	5	3,271	6	11	5
11	Egert Milder	"Georgia (On My Mind)"	38	4	5,005	8	12	4
12	Laura	"Break Me"	12	0	1,504	1	1	11

Detailed Jury Votes
R/O	Song	M. Enggaard	P. C. Alexander	S. Massy	F. Bergsson	D. Cantor	F. Lunden	Kazka	Kimbra	B. Henry	Total
1	"Only Dream"	10	2	2	7	4		4		3	32
2	"Young"	5	1		5		4	1	2	5	23
3	"By My Side"	8	12	4		2	6	3	6	7	48
4	"Majakad"	1		8	1	5	1		3		19
5	"I'm Sorry. I Messed Up"	7	6	1	3	7	5	5		4	38
6	"What Love Is"	2	4	12	12	1	8	10	1	6	56
7	"Out in Space"	4	10	10	4	6	3	8	5	8	58
8	"Write About Me"	6	8	7	8	12	10	12	12	12	87
9	"Beautiful Lie"	12	7	3	10	10	7	2	4	10	65
10	"Üks kord veel"	3	5	6	6	8	2	7	8	1	46
11	"Georgia (On My Mind)"		3	5	2		12	6	10		38
12	"Break Me"					3			7	2	12

Superfinal – 29 February 2020
R/O	Artist	Song	Televote	Place
1	Uku Suviste	"What Love Is"	33,582	1
2	Anett and Fredi	"Write About Me"	7,690	3
3	Jaagup Tuisk	"Beautiful Lie"	7,944	2

== At Eurovision ==
According to Eurovision rules, all nations with the exceptions of the host country and the "Big Five" (France, Germany, Italy, Spain and the United Kingdom) are required to qualify from one of two semi-finals in order to compete for the final; the top ten countries from each semi-final progress to the final. The European Broadcasting Union (EBU) split up the competing countries into six different pots based on voting patterns from previous contests, with countries with favourable voting histories put into the same pot. On 28 January 2020, a special allocation draw was held which placed each country into one of the two semi-finals, as well as which half of the show they would perform in. Estonia was placed into the second semi-final, to be held on 14 May 2020, and was scheduled to perform in the first half of the show. However, due to 2019-20 pandemic of Coronavirus, the contest was cancelled. Uku Suviste was subsequently reserved as a semi-finalist of Eesti Laul 2021 with a new song.

During the Eurovision Song Celebration YouTube broadcast in place of the semi-finals, it was revealed that Estonia was set to perform in position 2, following the entry from Greece and before the entry from Austria.
