= Sharon Vaughn =

American songwriter

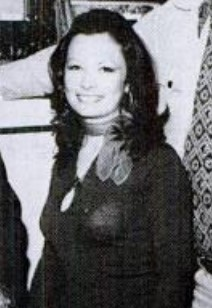

Background information
- Also known as: Mary S. Rice, M.S. Rice, Sharon Rice, Sharon Bellamy
- Born: Mary Sharon Vaughn; May 2, 1947 (age 79)
- Origin: Orlando, Florida, U.S.
- Genres: Pop, rock, country
- Occupation: Songwriter
- Years active: 1973–present

Mary Sharon Vaughn (born May 2, 1947) is an American songwriter who was previously based in Sweden. She has written hits for artists such as Willie Nelson, Waylon Jennings, Reba McEntire, The Oak Ridge Boys, George Jones, Kenny Rogers, Keith Whitley, Randy Travis, Patty Loveless, Agnes, Kate Ryan, Claire Richards, Boyzone, September, and Dimash Qudaibergen.

== Career ==
Vaughn moved to Nashville in her early 20s. In 1974, she charted two singles as a performer for Cinnamon Records: a duet with Narvel Felts titled "Until the End of Time", and "Never a Night Goes By". A year later, she signed with Dot Records and released a third single, "You and Me, Me and You". She was also the lead singer in the Lea Jane Singers, and worked with the Jordanaires, the Nashville Edition and The Holladay Sisters.

Vaughn's first big songwriting success was "My Heroes Have Always Been Cowboys", which was first recorded by Waylon Jennings in 1976 and further popularized in 1980 by Willie Nelson for the soundtrack of the movie The Electric Horseman. Her next songwriting hit was "Y'all Come Back Saloon" by The Oak Ridge Boys in 1977. Since then she has worked with country artists such as Dolly Parton, Waylon Jennings, George Jones, Tammy Wynette, Tanya Tucker and Kenny Rogers. Vaughn has been nominated for the Nashville Songwriters Hall of Fame three times, and was inducted in 2019.

Vaughn has during the last couple of years, had over 100 cuts with European artists and four number ones in Japan. She has worked with several Swedish Idol artists, including the winner Jay Smith (2010) and a number one hit for Ola. She has also worked with many Scandinavian songwriters and artists including Agnes, Mutt Lange, Tony Nilsson, Vendela, Anders Hanson and Emilia.

In 2009, her co-written song "Release Me" by Swedish pop artist Agnes reached #1 on the U.S Billboard Dance Club Songs Chart. In 2013, Vaughn received a JASRAC Award as #1 of the Top 10 Foreign Works for her 2011 co-written song "Rising Sun" by the Japanese pop band Exile.

During 2014, Vaughn competed as the songwriter of three songs in Melodifestivalen.

Vaughn has also co-written songs with Ian Dench and Carl Falk. Between 2005 and 2022, she has co-written at least 10 songs with Paul Brady which he recorded on his albums Say What You Feel, Unfinished Business, and Maybe So.

== Personal life ==
Vaughn moved to Sweden in 2008. In 2018, she was registered as having emigrated from Sweden. She returned to Orlando and then moved to Nashville in 2020 where she currently works.

== Charted singles ==
Year	Song	Peak chart positions
Year	Song	US Country
1974	"Until the End of Time" (with Narvel Felts)	39
1974	"Never a Night Goes By"	96
1975	"You and Me, Me and You"	99

== Songs written ==
The following table lists a selection of songs from Vaughn's career as a songwriter:

Year	Artist	Song
1976	Waylon Jennings	"My Heroes Have Always Been Cowboys"
1977	The Oak Ridge Boys	"Y'all Come Back Saloon"
1980	Willie Nelson	"My Heroes Have Always Been Cowboys"
1982	Reba McEntire	"I'm Not That Lonely Yet"
1982	Bobby Bare	"(I'm Not) A Candle in the Wind"
1982	Leon Everette	"Soul Searchin'"
1983	Leon Everette	"I Could'a Had You"
1983	Reba McEntire	"There Ain't No Future in This"
1985	Waylon Jennings	"The Broken Promise Land"
1986	John Schneider	"The Broken Promise Land"
1988	John Anderson	"Warm Place in the Snow"
1989	Keith Whitley	"Lady's Choice"
1990	Kenny Rogers and Holly Dunn	"Maybe"
1990	Keith Whitley and Lorrie Morgan	"'Til a Tear Becomes a Rose"
1990	Earl Thomas Conley	"Who's Gonna Tell Her Goodbye"
1991	Mark Chesnutt	"Broken Promise Land"
1993	George Jones	"Tear Me Out of the Picture"
1996	Patty Loveless	"Lonely Too Long"
1997	Sara Evans	"True Lies"
1998	Randy Travis	"Out of My Bones"
1999	Trisha Yearwood	"Powerful Thing"
2000	Craig Morgan	"When a Man Can't Get a Woman Off His Mind"
2004	Randy Travis	"Right on Time"
2004	Jimmy Buffett and Martina McBride	"Trip Around the Sun"
2007	Delta Goodrem	"The Guardian"
2008	Agnes	"Release Me"
2009	Alcazar	"Harlem Nights"
2009	Kevin Borg	"More Than I Do Now"
2009	Malena Ernman	"One Step From Paradise"
2010	The Wanted	"A Good Day For Love To Die"
2010	Boyzone	"Too Late For Hallelujah"
2011	EXILE	"Rising Sun"
2011	Girls' Generation	"Top Secret"
2011	September	"Heat Rising"
2011	Sunrise Avenue	"Angels on a Rampage"
2012	Namie Amuro	"Only You"
2012	Jedward	"Waterline"
2012	Charlotte Perrelli	"In The Sun"
2012	Tegoshi Yuya	"愛なんて" (Ai Nante [Such Thing As Love])
2013	Diandra	"Colliding Into You"
2013	Kimberley Walsh	"You First Loved Me"
2013	Sunrise Avenue	"Unholy Ground", "Lifesaver", I Can Break Your Heart", "Hurtsville", "Letters in the Sand", "Aim for the Kill", "Afraid of the Midnight"
2013	Robin Stjernberg	"Beautiful"
2013	Måns Zelmerlöw	"Braver On The Outside"
2013	Shirley Clamp	"Burning Alive"
2013	Helena Paparizou	"Survivor"
2013	Ellen Benediktson	"Songbird"
2016	Aurea	"I Didn't Mean It"
2017	Sunrise Avenue	"Room", "Home"
2018	Claire Richards	"My Heart Is Heading Home (This Christmas)"
2019	Sergey Lazarev	"Scream"
2020	Stefania Liberakakis	"Superg!rl"
2020	Uku Suviste	"What Love Is"
2021	Uku Suviste	"The Lucky One"
2021	Stefania Liberakakis	"Last Dance"
2021	Natalia Gordienko	"Sugar"
2021	Dimash Kudaibergen	"Stranger"

== Eurovision Song Contest entries ==
Involvement in Eurovision Song Contest entries
Year	Country	Song	Artist	Songwriters	Final		Semi-Final	
Year	Country	Song	Artist	Songwriters	Place	Points	Place	Points
2012	Ireland	"Waterline"	Jedward	Nick Jarl, Sharon Vaughn	19	46	6	92
2019	Russia	"Scream"	Sergey Lazarev	Philipp Kirkorov, Dimitris Kontopoulos, Sharon Vaughn	3	370	6	217
2020	Estonia	"What Love Is"	Uku Siviste	Sharon Vaughn, Uku Siviste	Contest cancelled			
2020	Greece	"Superg!rl"	Stefania	Sharon Vaughn, Dimitris Kontopoulos, Arcade	Contest cancelled			
2020	Moldova	"Prison"	Natalia Gordienko	Dimitris Kontopoulos, Philipp Kirkorov, Sharon Vaughn	Contest cancelled			
2021	Estonia	"The Lucky One"	Uku Siviste	Sharon Vaughn, Uku Siviste	Failed to qualify		13	58
2021	Greece	"Last Dance"	Stefania	Sharon Vaughn, Dimitris Kontopoulos, Arcade	10	170	6	184
2021	Moldova	"Sugar"	Natalia Gordienko	Dimitris Kontopoulos, Phillipp Kirkorov, Mikhail Gutseriyev, Sharon Vaughn	13	115	7	179
