= Katerine Duska =

Greek-Canadian singer and songwriter

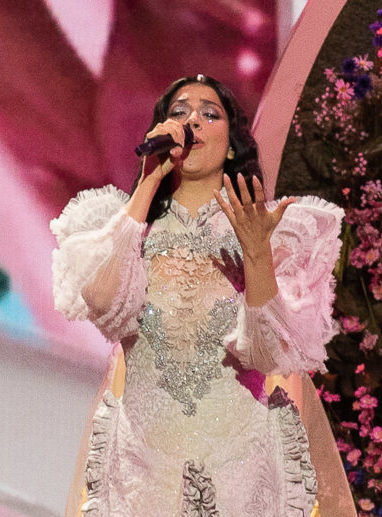

Background information
- Born: 5 November 1989 (age 36); Montreal, Quebec, Canada
- Genres: Indie pop; soul
- Occupations: Singer; songwriter
- Years active: 2014–present
- Labels: Minos EMI; Universal Music Greece

Katerine Duska (Greek: Κατερίνα Ντούσκα; born 5 November 1989) is a Greek-Canadian singer and songwriter. She represented Greece in the Eurovision Song Contest 2019 with the song "Better Love" which was released on 6 March 2019.

== Biography ==
Duska was born on 5 November 1989 in Montreal, Canada, and currently resides in Athens, Greece.

She released her 2015 debut album with the title Embodiment. In 2018, she appeared in a concert at the Concert Hall in Athens performing songs from her album with songs composed by Swedish singer-songwriter Albin Lee Meldau. Meldau also appeared in concert with Duska in September 2018 at the Palace Garden in Athens. In December 2018, she made a guest appearance at a concert of musician Petros Klampanis.

== Eurovision Participation ==
Duska participated in the Eurovision Song Contest 2019 and placed 21st with 74 points after qualifying from the first semi final of the competition. Talking to Wiwibloggs about her song, she said "Love has nothing to do with gender, it’s a very pro-human song".

== Discography ==
=== Studio albums ===
Title	Details
Embodiment	Released: 4 December 2015; Label: Minos EMI; Formats: CD, digital download

=== Singles ===
Title	Year	Peak chart positions		Album or EP
Title	Year	GRE	GRE (Dig.)	Album or EP
"One in a Million"	2014	—	—	Embodiment
"Won't Leave"	2015	—	—	Embodiment
"Better Love"	2019	18	4	Non-album singles
"Anemos" (with Leon of Athens)	2020	—	—	Non-album singles
"Sanctuary"	2020	—	—	Call Me Nyx EP
"Call Me Nyx"	2020	—	—	Call Me Nyx EP
"Athenian Skies"	2021	—	—	Call Me Nyx EP
"Of Time"	2022	—	—	Call Me Nyx EP
"Muse"	2022	—	—	Call Me Nyx EP
"Babel"	2022	—	—	Non-album singles
"Sunshine"	2024	—	—	Non-album singles
"—" denotes a release that did not chart or was not released in that territory.

Awards and achievements
Preceded by Yianna Terzi with "Oniro mou"	Greece in the Eurovision Song Contest; 2019	Succeeded by Stefania with "Superg!rl"
