= Last Dance (Stefania song) =

2021 single by Stefania Liberakakis

Single by Stefania
- Released: 10 March 2021
- Recorded: 2020–2021
- Studio: Vox Studios
- Genre: Pop, Synthwave
- Length: 3:00
- Label: K2ID
- Songwriters: Dimitris Kontopoulos; Arcade; Sharon Vaughn
- Producers: Arcade; Dimitris Kontopoulos

Stefania singles chronology
"Friday" (2020)	"Last Dance" (2021)	"Mucho Calor" (2021)

Music video
- "Last Dance" on YouTube

Eurovision Song Contest 2021 entry
- Country: Greece
- Artist: Stefania
- Language: English
- Composers: Dimitris Kontopoulos; Arcade
- Lyricists: Dimitris Kontopoulos; Arcade; Sharon Vaughn

Finals performance
- Semi-final result: 6th
- Semi-final points: 184
- Final result: 10th
- Final points: 170

Entry chronology
- ◄ "Supergirl" (2020)
- "Die Together" (2022) ►

Official performance video
- "Last Dance (Second Semi-Final) on YouTube "Last Dance (Final) on YouTube

"Last Dance" is a song recorded by Dutch singer Stefania, digitally released on 10 March 2021. It was written by Dimitris Kontopoulos, songwriting team Arcade and Sharon Vaughn. The song represented Greece in the Eurovision Song Contest 2021. Stefania was once again selected as the country's representative by the Greek public broadcaster Hellenic Broadcasting Corporation (ERT), after the cancellation of the previous edition.

== Background and composition ==
On 18 March 2020, the day of the 2020 contest's cancellation, ERT was one of the first four broadcasters to confirm their participation in the next edition and to announce their continued cooperation with their 2020 artist, Stefania. "Last Dance" was written by Dimitris Kontopoulos, songwriting team Arcade, consisting of Anastasios Rammos, Diveno, Gavriil Gavrilidis, Pavlos Manolis, Egion Parreniasi and Loukas Damianakos. and Sharon Vaughn. On 7 January 2021, "Last Dance" was announced as the title of selected song, with its release planned for 10 March. On March 10, 2021, the official video clip premiered through ERT's hybrid platform ERTFLIX, and later was released on YouTube and the streaming media platforms.

== Music video ==
The music video was filmed in Athens in February 2021 and was released at the same time as the premiere of the song, on 10 March 2020. Konstantinos Karydas, who was directed the official music video of "Supergirl", was chosen again to direct this year's video. He revealed information about the style of the video clip, which will be shot in studios and outdoors, aesthetics from paintings, dream images and many effects. Also, he said that the video clip tells a fantastic and dreamy story, which presses on the song's message that everything in life is transient and that each end brings a new beginning.

The official music video premiered on March 10, 2021, at 17:00 EET through ERTFLIX, ERT's hybrid platform and through Stefania's official channel on YouTube at 22:00 EET. "Using elements from Greek mythology, such as Pegasus and Atlas, given in a dreamy, but at the same time modern way", the central message of the song is highlighted, which is the phrase "Every end is always a new beginning".

== Eurovision Song Contest ==
=== Internal selection ===
On March 18, 2020, the Hellenic Broadcasting Corporation (ERT) announced Greek-Dutch singer Stefania as the Greek representative for the Eurovision Song Contest 2021. Stefania was to represent Greece in the previous cancelled edition of the contest. On March 10, 2021, the song "Last Dance" was officially released.

=== In Rotterdam ===
The Eurovision Song Contest 2021 took place at Rotterdam Ahoy in Rotterdam, the Netherlands, and consisted of two semi-finals held on 18 and 20 May, and the grand final on 22 May 2021. According to the Eurovision rules, each participating country, except the host country and the "Big Five", consisting of France, Germany, Italy, Spain and the United Kingdom, are required to qualify from one of two semi-finals in order to compete in the final; the top ten countries from each semi-final progress to the grand final. The European Broadcasting Union (EBU) split up the competing countries into six different pots based on voting patterns from previous contests, with countries with favourable voting histories put into the same pot. For the 2021 contest, the semi-final allocation draw held for 2020, which was held on 28 January 2020, was used. Greece was placed into the second semi-final, which was held on 20 May 2021, and performed in the first half of the show. After placing fifth in the semi-final, the song advanced to the Grand Final where it finished joint tenth with 170 points. (Note: The EBU officially recognises the song as finishing tenth outright as it received more points than Bulgaria's entry in the televoting.)

Fokas Evangelinos was announced as the artistic director for the entry, responsible for the country's stage performance. Stefania was joined on stage by four dancers: George Papadopoulos (stage director for the Greek entry at the 2014 Contest), Nikos Koukakis, Markos Giakoumoglou and Costas Pavlopoulos.

== Credits and personnel ==
Credits adapted from YouTube.

Locations

- Recorded at Vox Studios (Athens, Greece)
- Mixed at Cinelab Studios (Moscow, Russia)
- Mastered at Studio DMI (Las Vegas, Nevada, US)

Personnel

- Lead vocals – Stefania
- Songwriting – Dimitris Kontopoulos, Arcade, Sharon Vaughn
- Production – Dimitris Kontopoulos, Arcade Music
- Mixing – Andrei Konoplev
- Mastering – Luca Pretolesi
- Recording – Aris Binis

== Charts ==
Chart performance for "Last Dance"
Chart (2021)	Peak position
Belgium (Ultratip Bubbling Under Flanders)	30
Greece International (IFPI)	24
Iceland (Tónlistinn)	36
Lithuania (AGATA)	35
Netherlands (Single Top 100)	45
Sweden (Sverigetopplistan)	79
UK Singles Downloads (OCC)	75

== Release history ==
Release history for "Last Dance"
Country	Date	Format(s)	Label	Ref.
Various	10 March 2021	Digital download; streaming	K2ID	
Various	12 March 2021	Digital download; streaming	K2ID	
