= Fokas Evangelinos =

Greek dancer, choreographer and stage director (born 1963)

- Φωκάς Ευαγγελινός
- Born: 1963; Missolonghi, Greece
- Occupations: Stage director; Choreographer; Dancer

Fokas Evangelinos (Greek: Φωκάς Ευαγγελινός; born 1963) is a Greek dancer, choreographer and artistic director for television, film, stage and video clips. He was the creative director of the Eurovision Song Contest 2006 held in Athens and he has also staged and choreographed some of the most memorable performances at the Eurovision Song Contest from different countries.

== Career ==
Evangelinos was born in Missolonghi in 1963. After graduating from the Greek State School of Orchestral Art, he worked as a dancer in many dance groups and started his own career as a choreographer in 1991. He founded his own dance school in 1996. He has directed and choreographed performances at the National Theater of Greece, the Athens – Epidaurus Festival, the Greek National Opera, the National Theatre of Northern Greece and other theaters. He has also art directed films, television and music shows, dance groups, television series, video clips, concerts and has worked for international events such as the Eurovision Song Contest. He was also the creative director of the opening and closing ceremonies at the 2011 Special Olympics World Summer Games held at the Panathenaic Stadium in Athens.

=== Eurovision ===
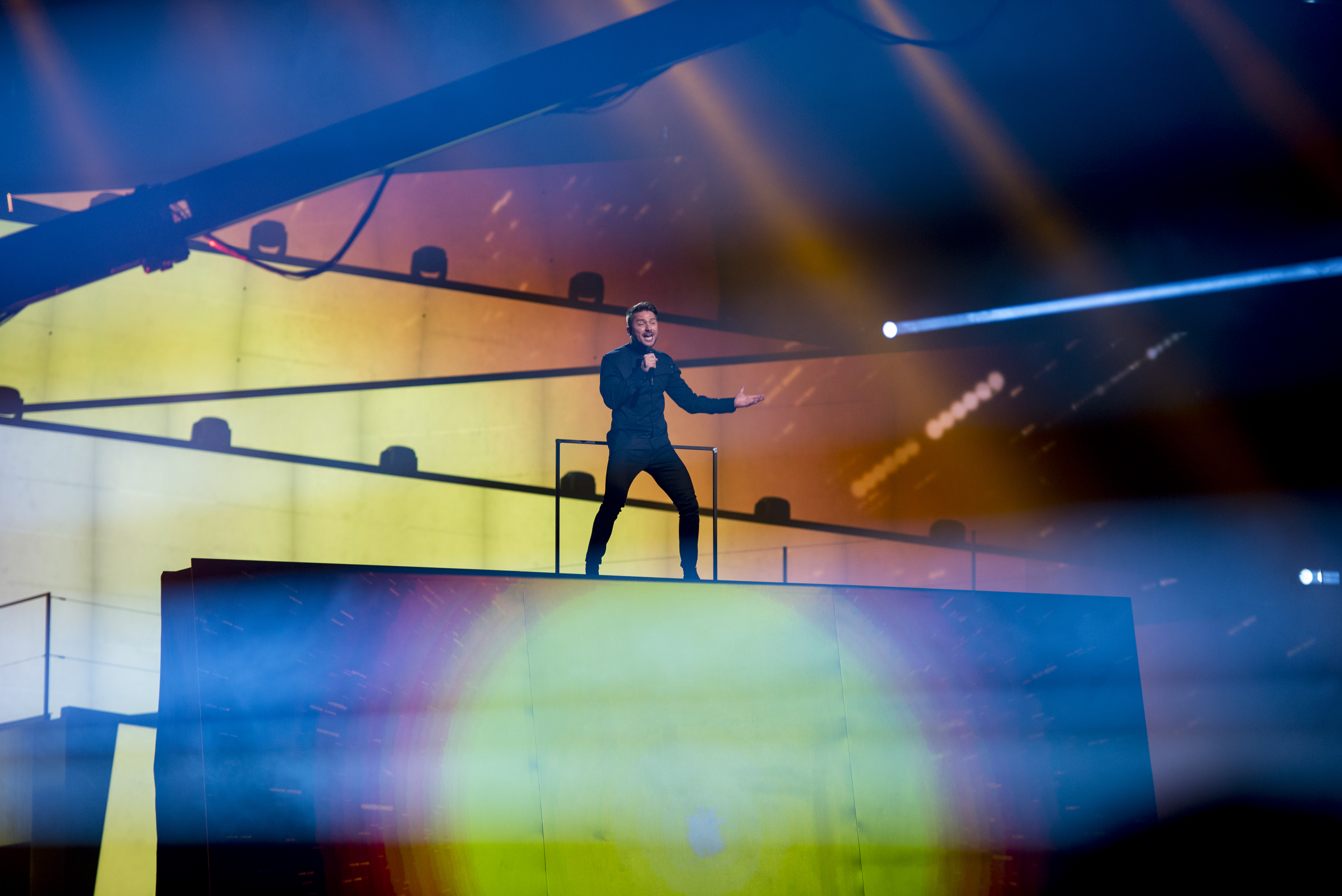
Sergey Lazarev (Russia) at the Eurovision Song Contest 2016

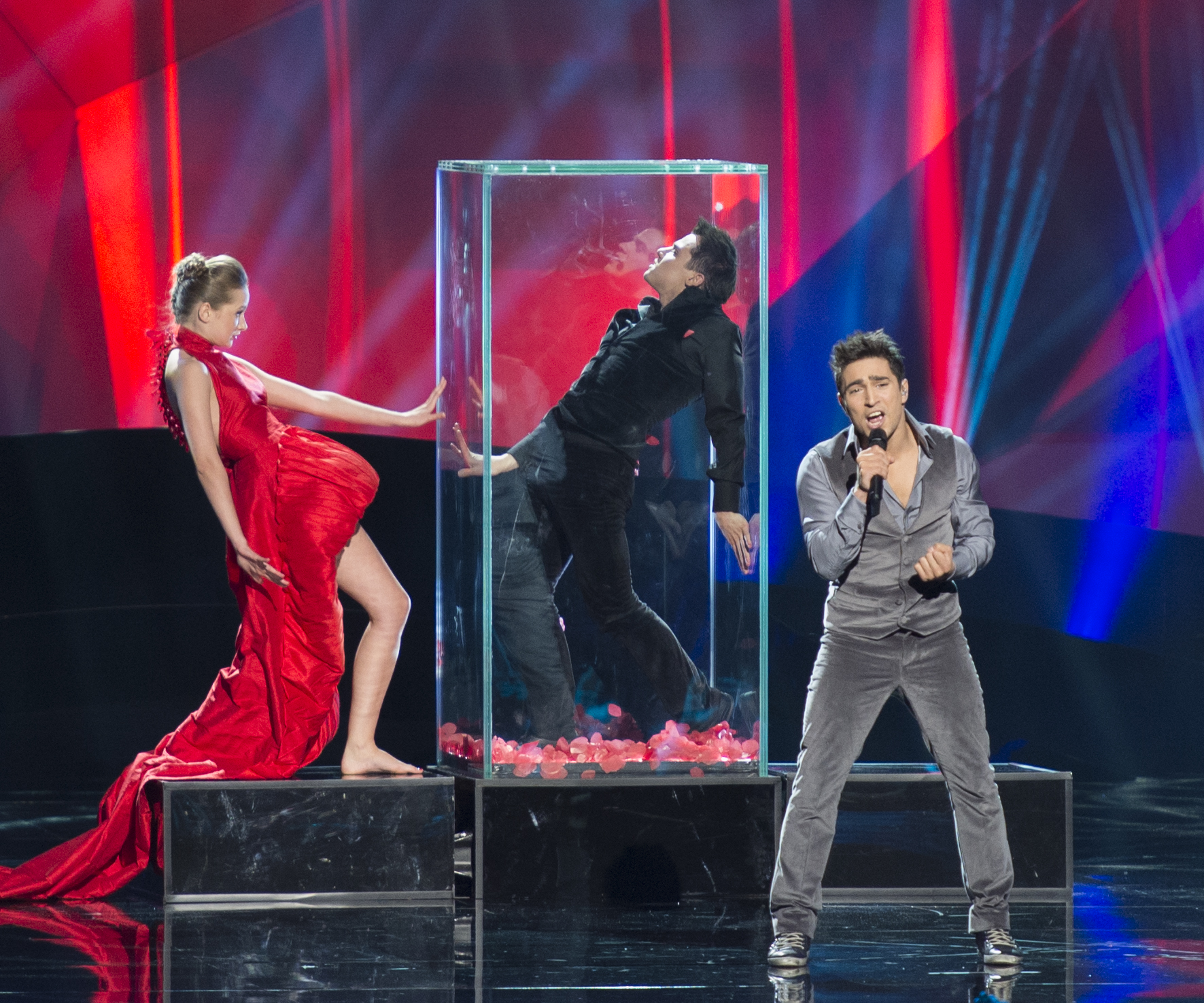
Farid Mammadov (Azerbaijan) at the Eurovision Song Contest 2013

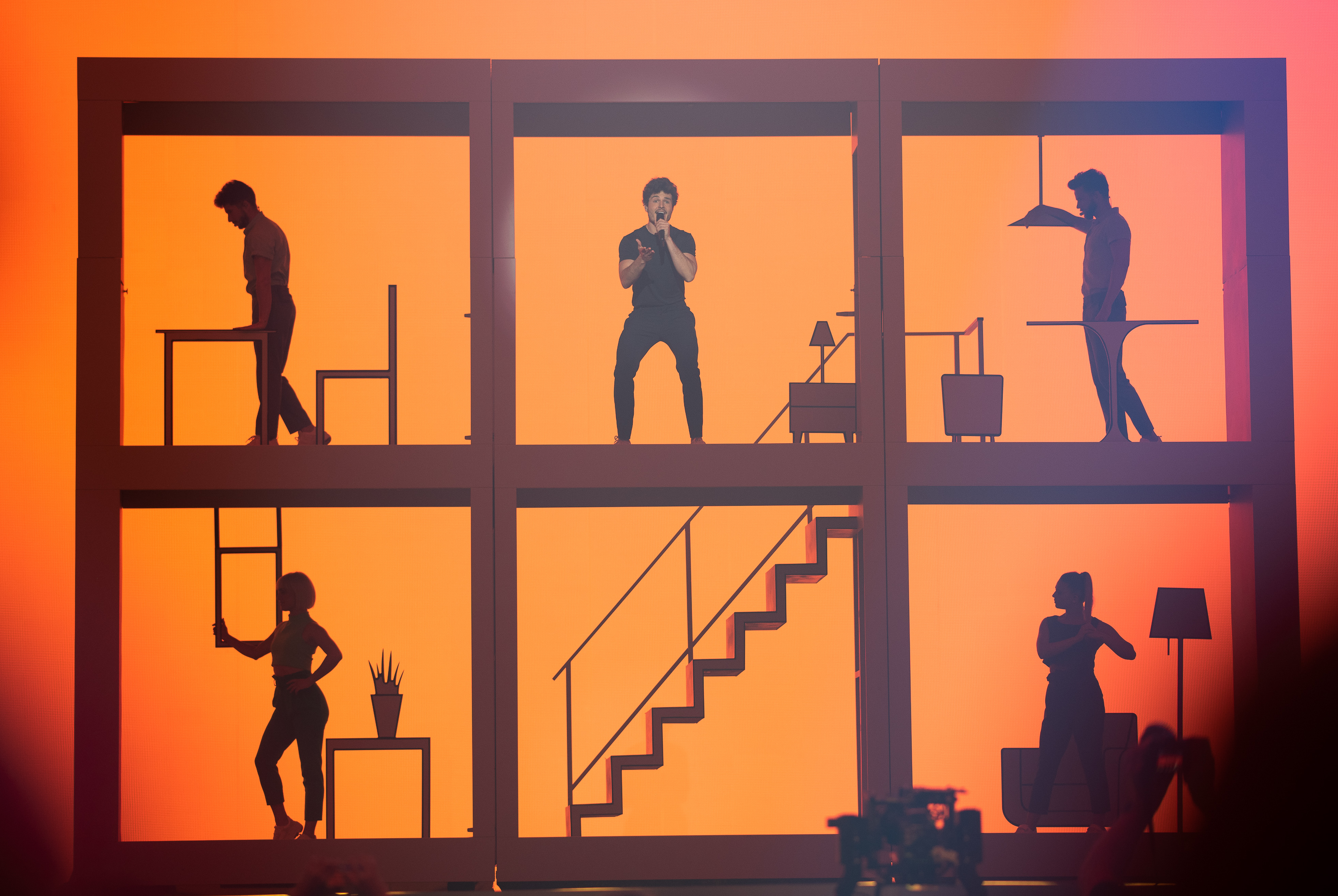
Miki Núñez (Spain) at the Eurovision Song Contest 2019

Evangelinos was the creative director and choreographer of the Eurovision Song Contest 2006 held in Athens and of several Greek national finals held by the Hellenic Broadcasting Corporation (ERT) to select its entry for Eurovision. He has also staged and choreographed some of the most memorable performances at Eurovision from different countries including:

| Year | Country | Song | Performer | Rank | Ref. |
|---|---|---|---|---|---|
| 2004 | Greece | "Shake It" | Sakis Rouvas | 3rd | |
| 2005 | Greece | "My Number One" | Helena Paparizou | 1st | |
| 2006 | Russia | "Never Let You Go" | Dima Bilan | 2nd | |
| 2007 | Belarus | "Work Your Magic" | Dmitry Koldun | 6th | |
| 2008 | Russia | "Believe" | Dima Bilan | 1st | |
| 2008 | Ukraine | "Shady Lady" | Ani Lorak | 2nd | |
| 2009 | Greece | "This Is Our Night" | Sakis Rouvas | 7th | |
| 2013 | Azerbaijan | "Hold Me" | Farid Mammadov | 2nd | |
| 2014 | Russia | "Shine" | Tolmachevy Sisters | 7th | |
| 2016 | Russia | "You Are the Only One" | Sergey Lazarev | 3rd | |
| 2017 | Greece | "This Is Love" | Demy | 19th | |
| 2018 | Moldova | "My Lucky Day" | DoReDoS | 10th | |
| 2018 | Azerbaijan | "X My Heart" | Aisel | NQ (Note: The song didn't qualified for the final, ending 11th in the first semi-final) | |
| 2019 | Russia | "Scream" | Sergey Lazarev | 3rd | |
| 2019 | Spain | "La venda" | Miki Núñez | 22nd | |
| ~~2020~~ | ~~Greece~~ | ~~"Supergirl"~~ | ~~Stefania~~ | (Note: Contest cancelled due to the COVID-19 pandemic in Europe) | |
| 2021 | Greece | "Last Dance" | Stefania | 10th | |
| 2021 | Moldova | "Sugar" | Natalia Gordienko | 13th | |
| 2022 | Greece | "Die Together" | Amanda Tenfjord | 8th | |
| 2024 | Greece | "Zari" | Marina Satti | 11th | |
| 2025 | Greece | "Asteromata" | Klavdia | 6th | |
| 2026 | Greece | "Ferto (song)" | Akylas | 10th | |
