= The Lucky One (Uku Suviste song) =

Estonian entry in the Eurovision Song Contest 2021

Single by Uku Suviste
- Released: 7 December 2020
- Length: 3:02
- Label: Horus Music
- Songwriters: Uku Suviste; Sharon Vaughn
- Producer: Dimitris Kontopoulos

Uku Suviste singles chronology
"Aisakell" (2020)	"The Lucky One" (2020)	"Vaata mulle silma" (2025)

Music video
- "The Lucky One" on YouTube

Eurovision Song Contest 2021 entry
- Country: Estonia
- Artist: Uku Suviste
- Language: English
- Composer: Uku Suviste
- Lyricist: Sharon Vaughn

Finals performance
- Semi-final result: 13th
- Semi-final points: 58

Entry chronology
- ◄ "What Love Is" (2020)
- "Hope" (2022) ►

"The Lucky One" is a song performed by Estonian singer Uku Suviste that represented Estonia in the Eurovision Song Contest 2021. The backing vocalist off-stage during Suviste's live performance at the Eurovision was Kaarel Orumägi.

== Eurovision Song Contest ==
The song was selected to represent Estonia in the Eurovision Song Contest 2021, after winning Eesti Laul, the music competition that selects Estonia's entries for the Eurovision Song Contest. The semi-finals of the 2021 contest featured the same line-up of countries as determined by the draw for the 2020 contest's semi-finals. Estonia was placed into the second semi-final, held on 20 May 2021, and performed in the first half of the show. It failed to progress to the final.
