= Brugklas: De tijd van m'n leven =

2019 film directed by Raymond Grimbergen

- Directed by: Raymond Grimbergen
- Written by: Arnout Vallenduuk; Sander Offenberg
- Based on: Brugklas (television series)
- Starring: Sterre van Woudenberg; Julian Moon Snijder; Stefania Liberakakis
- Cinematography: Goof de Koning
- Edited by: Boelie Vis
- Music by: Boelie Vis
- Release date: 7 February 2019 (Netherlands)
- Running time: 85 minutes
- Country: Netherlands
- Language: Dutch

Brugklas: De tijd van m'n leven (Dutch pronunciation: [ˈbrʏxklɑs | də ˈtɛit fɑ mən ˈleːvə(n)]; The First Years: The time of my life) is a 2019 film directed by Raymond Grimbergen. The film is based on the television series The First Years (Brugklas).

The film won the Golden Film award after having sold 100,000 tickets.

== Production ==
Principal photography began in October 2018. In December 2018, it was announced that Dennis van der Geest and Natasja Froger were added to the cast. The film is Froger's acting debut; she previously appeared as herself in Gooische Vrouwen.
