= Stefania (singer) =

Dutch singer (born 2002)

Stefania Στεφανία
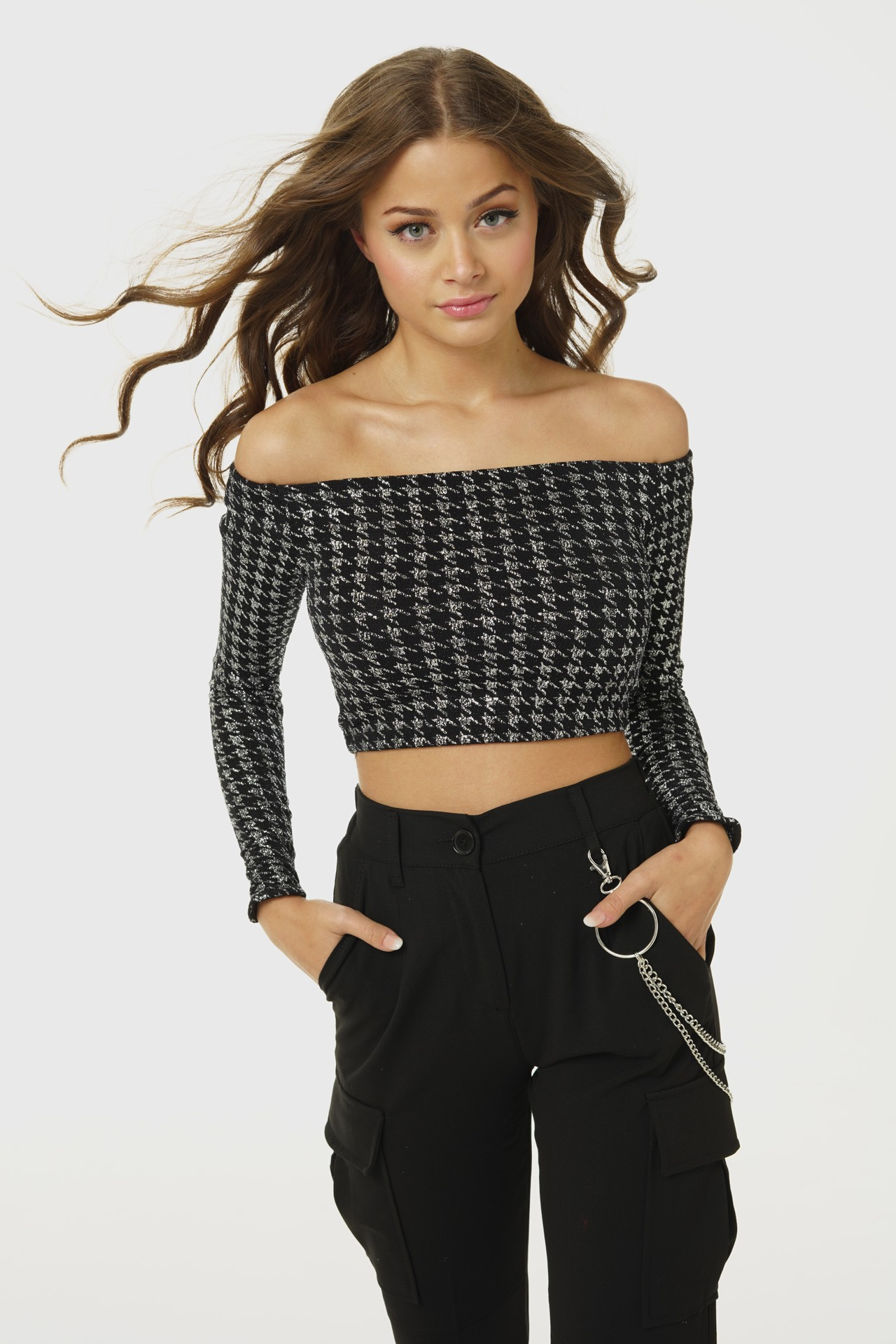
- Liberakakis in 2020

Background information
- Born: Stefania Liberakakis; 17 December 2002 (age 23); Utrecht, Netherlands
- Genres: Pop
- Occupations: Singer; voice actress; YouTuber
- Years active: 2013–present
- Formerly of: Kinderen voor Kinderen; Kisses
- Website: stefaniamusic.eu

Stefania Liberakakis (Greek: Στεφανία Λυμπερακάκη, romanized: Stefanía Lymperakáki; born 17 December 2002), known simply as Stefania, is a Dutch singer. She is a former member of the girl group Kisses, which represented the Netherlands in the Junior Eurovision Song Contest 2016.

In 2020, Stefania was selected to represent Greece in the Eurovision Song Contest 2020 with the song "Supergirl", but this edition of the contest was later cancelled due to the COVID-19 pandemic. The Greek broadcaster ERT decided that Stefania would represent Greece in the 2021 contest, this time with the song "Last Dance", finishing in tenth place.

== Early life ==
Stefania was born on 17 December 2002 in Utrecht, Netherlands to Greek parents, Koula and Spyros Liberakakis. Her family originates from Thourio and Sofiko, both located in Evros, Greece. She is the niece of Greek actor Yannis Stankoglou.

== Career ==
=== 2013: The Voice Kids ===
In 2013, Stefania was a contestant in the third season of the Dutch edition of The Voice Kids in the Netherlands. She joined Team Borsato after her blind audition, but was eliminated in the battle rounds. Stefania joined the children's choir Kinderen voor Kinderen, which she left after two years.

The Voice Kids performances and results
Episode	Song	Original artist	Result
Blind Audition	"No One"	Alicia Keys	Joined Team Marco Borsato
The Battles	"Hoe" (How)	Nielson & Miss Montreal	Eliminated

=== 2016: Junior Eurovision Song Contest ===
In 2016, Stefania participated in auditions of Junior Songfestival, the Dutch preselection for the Junior Eurovision Song Contest. She was internally chosen to represent the Netherlands in the Junior Eurovision Song Contest 2016 in Valletta as part of the girl group Kisses. The group performed the song "Kisses and Dancin'" and placed eighth out of seventeen entries.

=== 2017–2019: Solo career and acting ===
In 2018, Stefania released her first solo single named "Stupid Reasons". In 2019, she released three more singles: "Wonder", "I'm Sorry (Whoops!)" and "Turn Around". In June 2019, she performed a cover of the song "Con Calma" – together with Konnie Metaxa and Ilenia Williams – at the MAD Video Music Awards, which was broadcast on Greek television. From 2018 onwards, Stefania starred as Fenna in the TV series Brugklas. She also starred in the Dutch movies Brugklas: De tijd van m'n leven, De Club van Lelijke Kinderen (as singer) and 100% Coco New York (as Lilly).

=== Eurovision Song Contest 2020 and 2021 ===
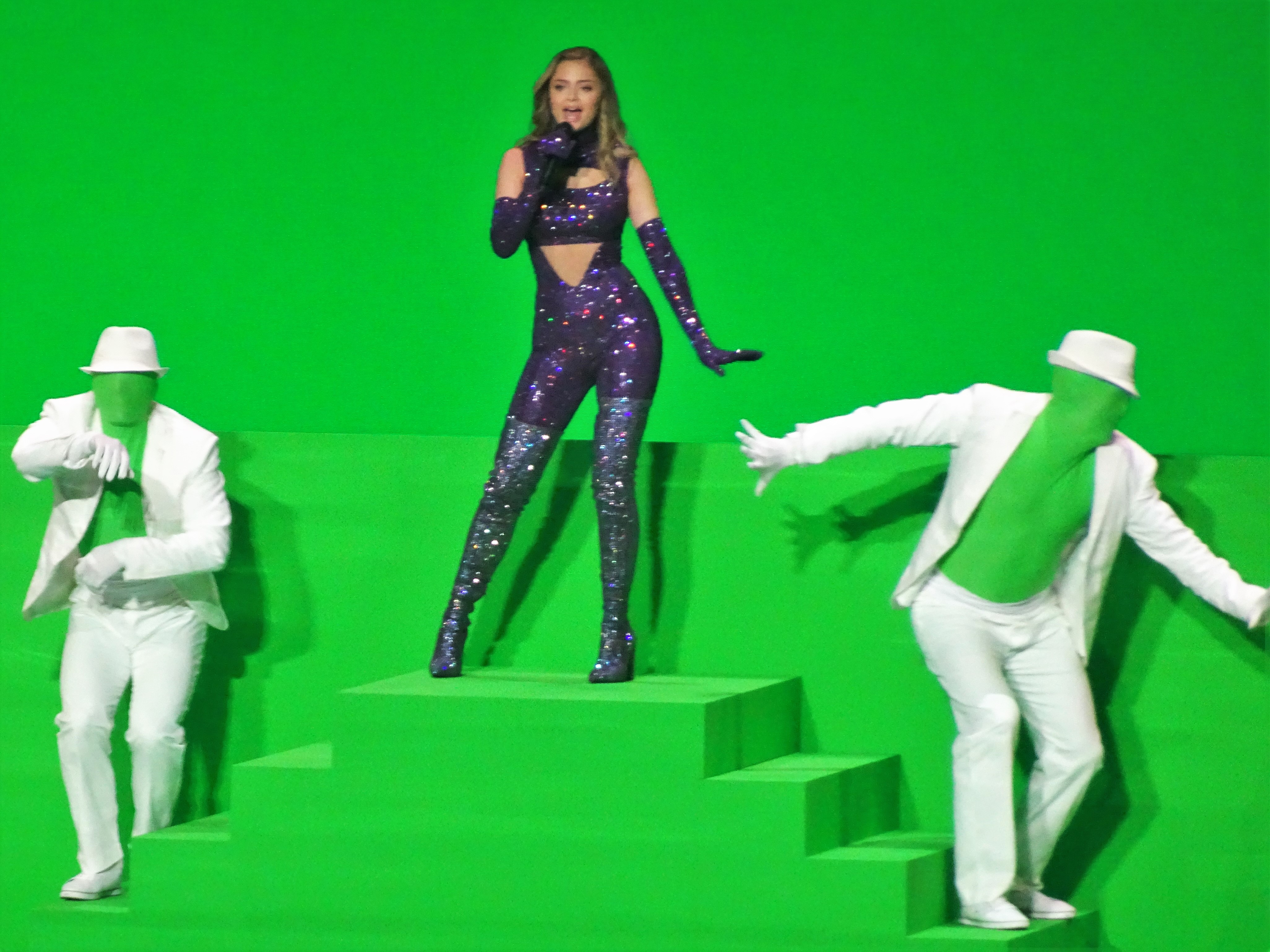
Liberakakis performing at the Eurovision Song Contest 2021

In late 2019, Stefania was named as a potential candidate to represent Greece in the Eurovision Song Contest 2020, which would occur in Rotterdam, the Netherlands. On 3 February 2020, it was confirmed by broadcaster ERT that she had indeed been selected to succeed Katerine Duska as the Greek representative. She would have performed the song "Supergirl" in the second semi-final on 14 May 2020. However, on 18 March, the EBU announced the cancellation of the contest due to the COVID-19 pandemic. On the same day, ERT announced that Greece would participate in the Eurovision Song Contest 2021, with Stefania as the country's representative.

In the 2021 contest, Stefania participated with the song "Last Dance", which was released on 10 March 2021. On 20 May 2021, Stefania performed the song in the second semi-final, in which she also qualified for the final. Stefania was accompanied on stage by dancers George Papadopoulos, Nikos Koukakis, Markos Giakoumoglou and Costas Pavlopoulos, while Fokas Evangelinos was the choreographer and the artistic director of the entry.

== Discography ==
=== Singles ===
==== Solo ====
Title	Year	Peak chart positions					Album
Title	Year	GRE	NLD	LIT	SWE	UK Down.	Album
"Stupid Reasons"	2018	—	—	—	—	—	Non-album singles
"All I Want For Christmas Is You"	2018	—	—	—	—	—	L'esprit de Noël (comp.)
"Wonder" (from the Dutch version of Wonder Park)	2019	—	—	—	—	—	Non-album singles
"I'm Sorry (Whoops!)"	2019	—	—	—	—	—	Non-album singles
"Over and Over Again" (with Jannes)	2019	—	—	—	—	—	Non-album singles
"Turn Around"	2019	—	—	—	—	—	Non-album singles
"Supergirl"	2020	19	—	—	—	—	Non-album singles
"Friday"	2020	—	—	—	—	—	Non-album singles
"Swipe" (with Rein van Duivenboden)	2020	—	—	—	—	—	Non-album singles
"Last Dance"	2021	24	45	35	79	75	Non-album singles
"Mucho Calor"	2021	—	—	—	—	—	Non-album singles
"Wait No More"	2022	—	—	—	—	—	Non-album singles
"You Lost Me"	2022	—	—	—	—	—	Non-album singles
"My My My"	2022	—	—	—	—	—	Non-album singles
"Yalla Baby"	2022	—	—	—	—	—	Non-album singles

==== As part of Kisses ====
Title	Year	Album
"Kisses and Dancin'"	2016	Non-album singles

== Filmography ==
=== Television ===
Year(s)	Title	Role	Notes
2018–2020	Brugklas	Fenna & Stefania	Season 7 & 8
2020	Eurovision: Europe Shine a Light	Herself	Guest via video message
2021	Your Face Sounds Familiar	Herself	Guest star on the 8th live show
2021	Eurovision Song Contest 2021	Herself	Greek entrant – 10th place

=== Television (as contestant) ===
Year(s)	Title	Role	Notes
2023	Alles is Muziek	Herself	

=== Film ===
Year	Title	Role	Notes
2019	Brugklas: De tijd van m'n leven	Fenna	—
2019	Wonder Park	June	Dutch voice
2019	100% Coco New York	Lilly	—
2019	De Club van Lelijke Kinderen	Singer of propaganda song	—
2019	Trouble	Zoe Bell	Dutch voice
2020	Dolittle	Lady Rose	Dutch voice

Awards and achievements
Preceded by Katerine Duska with "Better Love"	Greece in the Eurovision Song Contest; 2020 (cancelled)	Succeeded by Herself with "Last Dance"
Preceded by Herself with "Supergirl"	Greece in the Eurovision Song Contest; 2021	Succeeded by Amanda Tenfjord with "Die Together"
