= Uku Suviste =

Estonian singer

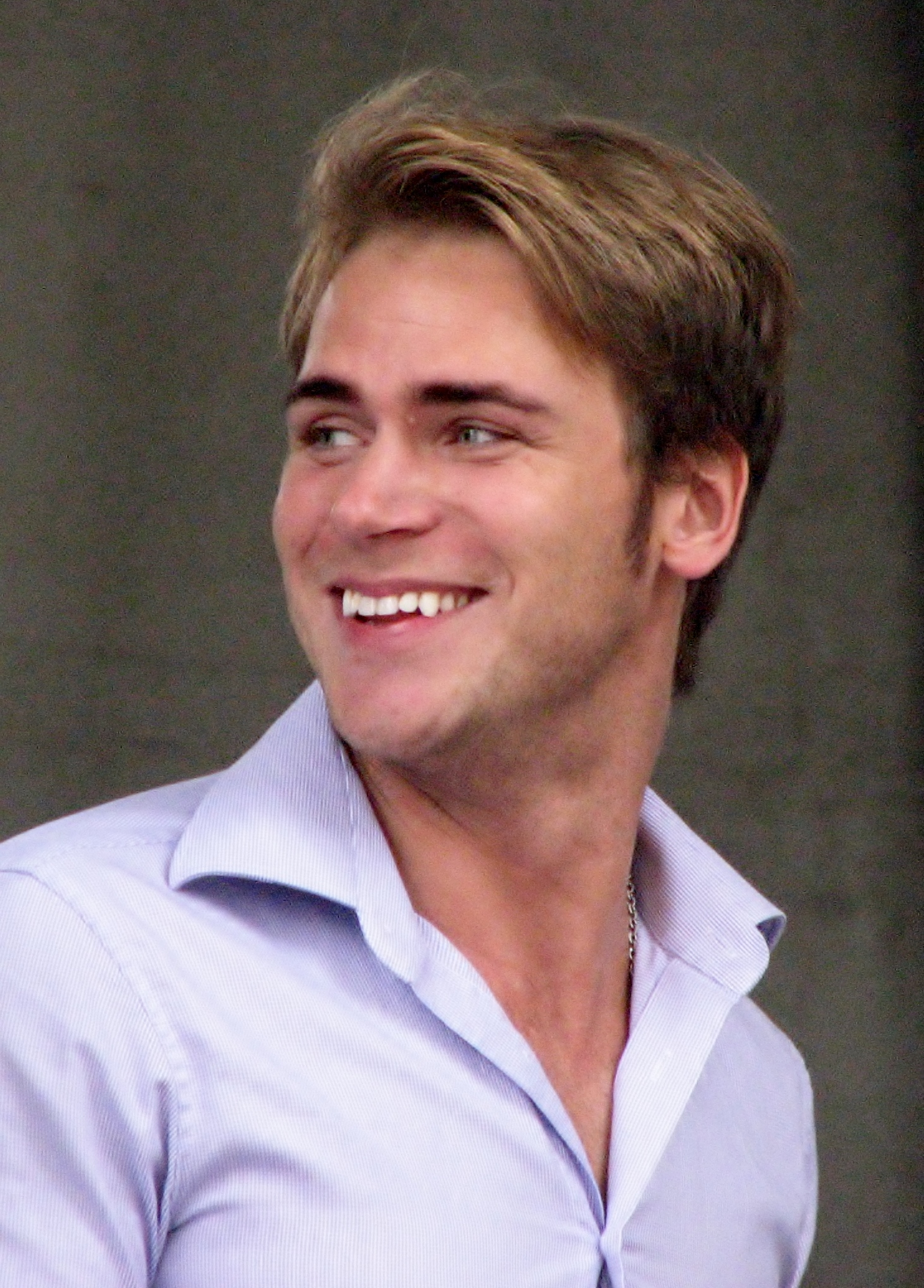
- Uku Suviste in 2013
- Born: 6 June 1982 (age 43); Võru, then part of Estonian SSR, Soviet Union
- Occupations: Singer; songwriter; music producer
- Musical career
- Genres: Pop; R&B; soul; funk
- Instruments: Vocals; Keyboard; Piano; Guitar; Bass guitar; Drums
- Years active: 2008–present
- Website: ukusuviste.com

Uku Suviste (born 6 June 1982) is an Estonian singer-songwriter, pianist and music producer. He was scheduled to represent Estonia in the Eurovision Song Contest 2020 in Rotterdam, Netherlands, before cancellation of the competition that year. Instead, he represented Estonia in the Eurovision Song Contest 2021.

== Education ==
At the age of six, Suviste began his education in specialised music class at Tallinn School No. 21. At the same time, he started attending in Tallinn Boys Choir and in school's boy choir under the guidance of Lydia Rahula. She was also his solfeggio teacher and prepared him well for the time when he entered the Tallinn Music School. In 1997, he graduated specializing in piano.

In 2000, he graduated high school at Tallinn School No. 21 with commendations in music and P.E. After high school, he underwent eight months of military service at the Guard Battalion.

In 2001, he was admitted to the Estonian Information Technology College, and four years later he graduated in the specialty of computer systems administrator. A year after joining the IT College, he went to the Georg Ots Tallinn School of Music to study pop jazz singing.

For one and a half years starting in 2006, he studied at Berklee College of Music in Boston, Massachusetts, USA, majoring in singing, contemporary writing and music production.

== Music career ==
Starting 2004, Suviste has participated in Uno Naissoo youth singing and music composition competition for many years. In 2004, he was awarded a special prize for his original song "Never Have To". The following year his polyphonic a cappella song "Sõbrad" ("Friends") for six-voice vocals ensemble won 2nd place. In 2008, the song "Refreshing" written by Suviste and his friend Mairo Marjamaa won the competition.

In 2005, Suviste participated in the well-known Estonian singing contest "Kaks Takti Ette" and came in 3rd place. Subsequent to the contest, he got the opportunity to work in Elmar Liitmaa's music studio "Rockhouse" as a music producer. While working in the studio and producing songs for many well-known Estonian artists, he gained valuable experience and had the opportunity to record a lot of his own original songs.

In 2005, he self-produced and released his first original CD album, titled "It’s Christmas Time".

Throughout 2006, Suviste was a part of an Estonian R&B and '80s disco music band called "Lament". He was the second vocal soloist and also played the keyboard.

In November 2008, he collaborated with the 2007 "Estonian Idol" winner Birgit Õigemeel, and they released the album "Ilus Aeg" ("Beautiful time"). Suviste arranged all the tracks on the album, and sang in a few songs in duet with Birgit. To promote their album, the duo gave a number of concerts.

In 2010, Suviste took part in Russia's largest song contest "New Wave", finishing in 3rd place.

In 2012, Suviste produced the music video "Võitmatu" ("Invincible"), with the support and cooperation of the Estonian Defence Forces and the Estonian Ministry of Defence. The music video was dedicated to all the soldiers, who had served in the armed forces in Afghanistan, and to the servicemembers' families. Two guest performers made a cameo appearance in the beginning and end of the video, to also show their support for Estonian soldiers. The first was Estonian discus thrower and Olympic gold medalist Gerd Kanter, and the other was Justin Gatlin, an American sprinter and Olympic gold medalist in the 100-metre run.

In Autumn 2014, Suviste took part in the Estonian television parody show "Sinu Nägu Kõlab Tuttavalt" ("Your Face Sounds Familiar").

Suviste competed in the 7th season of the Russian version of The Voice in 2018, where he was coached by Ani Lorak. He was eliminated from the competition in the semi-final.

Suviste has competed in the Eesti Laul music competition several times. The contest is used to select Estonia's entry for Eurovision. In Eesti Laul 2017 he competed with the song "Supernatural", but was eliminated in the first semi-final. Suviste participated in Eesti Laul 2019, with the song "Pretty Little Liar". He made it through the second semi-final, and placed second in the final. Suviste competed again in Eesti Laul 2020 with his song "What Love Is" and won the national final, becoming the Estonian entry at the 2020 Eurovision Song Contest. When Eurovision was canceled due to the COVID-19 pandemic, Suviste was not named the Estonian artist for Eurovision 2021, as happened in some other countries. He was, however, offered a spot in the semi-finals for Eesti Laul 2021, which he accepted. Suviste won Eesti Laul 2021 and represented Estonia in the Eurovision Song Contest 2021 with his song "The Lucky One". He participated in the second semi-final of the contest, but failed to qualify for the grand final, finishing 13th.

== Musical theatre ==
Suviste has performed as an ensemble member in several stage musicals, such as Bart's "Oliver!" and Kander's "Chicago". In "West Side Story" and "Grease", however, he was cast on leading roles, Tony and Danny, respectively. In the latter, he played against Getter Jaani, who was then cast as Sandy.

== Achievements ==
=== Uno Naissoo Song Contest ===
2004	Special prize for original song "Never Have To"
2005	2nd place, with polyphonic a cappella song "Sõbrad" ("Friends") for a six-voice vocal ensemble
2008	1st place with the song "Refreshing", co-written with Suviste's friend Mairo Marjamaa

=== Young singer's contest "Kaks Takti Ette" ===
2005 – won 3rd place, and best male singer.

=== International song contest "New Wave" ===
In 2010, Suviste took part in Russia's largest song contest "New Wave" (Russian: Новая волна, translit. Novaya volna), which took place in Jūrmala, Latvia, and won 3rd place. There were 12,000 participants, and the contest was broadcast in 31 countries.

== Personal life ==
Suviste's father is Estonian TV producer Raivo Suviste, and his mother is Dana Suviste.

Dana Suviste graduated the Tallinn State Conservatory (now the Estonian Academy of Music and Theatre) under the guidance of Hendrik Krumm, specialising in classical singing.

Suviste's uncle Väino Puura and Puura's wife Sirje Puura are well-known opera singers in Estonia.

== Miscellaneous ==
- In 2010, readers of the magazine Kroonika rated Suviste "Estonia's Sexiest Man".
- In late 2010, Suviste performed with dance instructor and show host Kaisa Oja in Kanal 2's Tantsud tähtedega, the local variety of "Dancing with the Stars".
- In 2011, Suviste became a patron of UNICEF Estonia.

== Discography ==
=== Singles ===
As lead artist

Title	Year
"It's Christmas Time"	2005
"See on nii hea"	2008
"Love of my life" (featuring Grace Taylor)	2009
"Sind otsides"	2009
"Saatanlik naine"	2009
"Show me the love"	2010
"Isju Tebja"	2010
"Jagatud öö"	2011
"Midagi head" (featuring Violina)	2011
"Võitmatu"	2012
"Valge Lumi" (with Anzhelika Agurbash)	2013
"I wanna be the one" (with Kéa)	2014
"Supernatural"	2016
"Pretty Little Liar"	2019
"What Love Is"	2020
"Müüdud ja Pakitud"	2020
"Torman Tulle"	2020
"The Lucky One"	2020

=== Charted singles ===
==== As lead artist ====
Title	Year	Peak chart position	Album
Title	Year	EST Air.	Album
"Vaata mulle silma"	2025	44	Non-album singles

As featured artist

Title	Year
"Believe" (Hawt Leopards featuring Uku Suviste)	2015
"Bonfire" (Ollie featuring Uku Suviste)	2015
"Las meile jääda" (Põhja-Tallinn featuring Anne Veski, Pearu Paulus, Merlyn Uusküla, Uku Suviste, Uudo Sepp, Krislin Sallo & Tobias Rosentau)	2019
"Aisakell" (Heldene Aeg featuring Uku Suviste)	2020

=== Music videos ===
- "Võitmatu" (2012)
- "Show me the love" (2010)
- "Valge Lumi" Anzhelika Agurbash and Uku Suviste (2013)
- "I wanna be the one" Uku Suviste & Kéa (2014)
- "What Love Is" (2020)
- "Müüdud ja Pakitud" (2020)
- "The Lucky One" (2021)

Preceded by Victor Crone with "Storm"	Estonia in the Eurovision Song Contest; 2020 (cancelled)	Succeeded by Himself with "The Lucky One"
Preceded by Himself with "What Love Is"	Estonia in the Eurovision Song Contest; 2021	Succeeded by Stefan with "Hope"
