= Supergirl (Stefania song) =

2020 single by Stefania

Single by Stefania
- Released: 1 March 2020
- Studio: Vox Studios
- Genre: Dance-pop
- Length: 3:00
- Label: K2ID
- Songwriters: Dimitris Kontopoulos; Arcade; Sharon Vaughn
- Producer: Arcade

Stefania singles chronology
"Turn Around" (2019)	"Supergirl" (2020)	"Friday" (2020)

Music video
- "Supergirl" on YouTube

Eurovision Song Contest 2020 entry
- Country: Greece
- Artist: Stefania
- Language: English
- Composers: Dimitris Kontopoulos; Arcade
- Lyricists: Dimitris Kontopoulos; Arcade; Sharon Vaughn

Finals performance
- Semi-final result: Contest cancelled

Entry chronology
- ◄ "Better Love" (2019)
- "Last Dance" (2021) ►

"Supergirl" (stylized as SUPERG!RL) is a song recorded by Dutch singer Stefania, digitally released on 1 March 2020. It was written by Dimitris Kontopoulos, lyricist Sharon Vaughn, and production team Arcade. The song was intended to represent Greece in the Eurovision Song Contest 2020 before the event's cancellation due to the COVID-19 pandemic. Stefania had been internally selected as the country's representative by Greek public broadcaster Hellenic Broadcasting Corporation (ERT).

The track is a dance-pop song that encourages teenagers to believe in themselves and pursue their dreams. For promotion, Stefania released a music video of the song and appeared on talk shows in both Greece and the Netherlands.

== Background and composition ==
On 3 February 2020, during a Hellenic Broadcasting Corporation (ERT) newscast, Stefania was announced as the Greek entrant for the Eurovision Song Contest 2020 with the song "Supergirl". "Supergirl" was written by Dimitris Kontopoulos, lyricist Sharon Vaughn, and production team Arcade, consisting of Anastasios Rammos, Diverno, Gabriel Russell and Pavlos Manolis. The song and its accompanying music video were released on 1 March 2020, during ERT's premiere of Eurovision Song Contest - Final Countdown, hosted by Mihalis Marinos. Given that Stefania was the youngest artist ever selected to represent Greece, at 17, Kontopoulos stated that it was difficult to find the right song for her, as he sought one that would fit both her age and personality. In a press release, ERT described "Supergirl" as an "up-tempo pop song with ethnic elements", while Stefania added that it's "a dance pop song in true Ariana Grande style". ERT also described that the song encourages teenagers to believe in themselves and pursue their dreams, inspired by Stefania's daily struggles to combine her duties as a student while pursuing her dream of singing.

== Music video and promotion ==
The music video was released at the same time as the premiere of the song on 1 March 2020. Konstantinos Karydas directed the video, which was filmed over a two-day period at four locations in and around Athens. Karydas said:

"We created a story with surreal elements. We are following a young girl who finds the strength to embrace her specialty in a society that sees her as something foreign. It is a journey of exploration of power within it. The video comes to complement the song, which is dynamic and fresh. The whole team is made up of professionals, who in their field have given 100% to get a perfect result. We also had a great collaboration with Stefania, which surprised us with her hard work and acting skills". (Note: Karydas' remarks were in Greek and have been translated.)

The video portrays Stefania as a supernatural being with the ability to fly and use telekinesis. Reluctant to exhibit her powers, she is seen helping a classmate avoid slipping on a banana and saves a cat from a tree. Throughout the video a classmate takes an interest in her and she eventually realizes that the "greatest power may well be love".

Stefania has since been featured in both print and broadcast media in Greece and her native Netherlands. She appeared on the popular Dutch talk show Jinek speaking of her excitement about participating in the contest and was subsequently featured in a cover shoot for Gala magazine. The Dutch broadcaster VPRO was also recording her for a documentary. In Greece, Stefania's promotion began a year prior with her performance of the song "Con Calma" at the MAD Video Music Awards in June 2019. In advance of Eurovision, ERT sought to see if Stefania and the Greek audience had a connection. Following her selection and appearance on Greek television, she found that the Greek paparazzi would follow her and fans began to recognise her, which Stefania called "a very funny experience". An unplugged version of the song was performed in late March as part of Kontopoulos' initiative "Qsessions" during the COVID-19-related lockdown. It served as her first live performance of the song.

== Eurovision Song Contest ==
The Eurovision Song Contest 2020 was originally scheduled to take place at Rotterdam Ahoy in Rotterdam, Netherlands and consist of two semi-finals on 12 and 14 May, and a final on 16 May 2020. According to Eurovision rules, each country, except the host nation and the "Big Five" (France, Germany, Italy, Spain and the United Kingdom), would have been required to qualify from one of two semi-finals to compete for the final; the top ten countries from each semi-final would have progressed to the final. On 28 January 2020, the allocation draw was held, placing "Supergirl" into the first half of the second semi-final. Fokas Evangelinos was hired to organize the staging and choreography for the performance. However, due to the COVID-19 pandemic in Europe, the contest was cancelled on 18 March 2020. The EBU announced soon after that entries intended for 2020 would not be eligible for the following year, though each broadcaster would be able to send either their 2020 representative or a new one. ERT responded that its intention was to continue its cooperation with Stefania for the next contest in 2021. During a Eurovision Song Celebration YouTube live stream, the EBU revealed that it would have opened the second semi-final, preceding Estonia's entry, which was also written by Vaughn.

=== Alternative song contests ===
Some of the broadcasters scheduled to take part in the Eurovision Song Contest 2020 have organised alternative competitions. Austria's ORF aired Der kleine Song Contest in April 2020, which saw every entry being assigned to one of three semi-finals. A jury consisting of ten singers that had represented Austria at Eurovision before was hired to rank each song; the best-placed in each semi-final advanced to the final round. In the third semi-final on 18 April, "Supergirl" placed seventh in a field of 13 participants, achieving 51 points. The song also partook in Sveriges Television's Sveriges 12:a in May, and was qualified for the final round, finishing 15th.

== Track listing ==
- Digital download (Note: This acts as a summary of all versions of the single released for digital download.)
1. "Supergirl" – 3:00

== Credits and personnel ==
Credits adapted from YouTube.

Locations

- Recorded at Vox Studios (Athens, Greece)
- Mixed at Cinelab Studios (Moscow, Russia)
- Mastered at Sterling Sound Studios (New York, New York, USA)

Personnel

- Lead vocals – Stefania
- Songwriting – Dimitris Kontopoulos, Arcade, Sharon Vaughn
- Production – Dimitris Kontopoulos, Arcade
- Mixing – Andrei Konoplev
- Mastering – Chris Gehringer
- Recording – Aris Binis

== Charts ==
Chart (2020)	Peak position
Greece International (IFPI)	19

== Release history ==
Country	Date	Format(s)	Label	Ref.
Various	1 March 2020	Digital download, streaming	K2ID	
