= The First Years =

Dutch television series

- Also known as: Belgium - Het Middelbaar; United Kingdom - The First Years
- Native name: Brugklas (The Netherlands)
- Starring: Britt Scholte, Niek Roozen, Belle Zimmerman, Sonia Eijken, Leonard Schoots, Bickel Krabbe, Stefania Liberakakis
- Ending theme: Testimonials
- Country of origin: Netherlands
- Original language: Dutch
- No. of seasons: 6

Production
- Production location: Zaanlands Lyceum
- Running time: 10 minutes (Season 1, 3-6) 20 minutes (Season 2)
- Production company: Tuvalu Media

Original release
- Network: NPO Zapp, AVROTROS
- Release: May 26, 2014

The First Years (Dutch: Brugklas) is a Dutch mockumentary series, sometimes described as a "scripted reality" series, about students at a junior high school. The first episode aired on May 26, 2014 by NPO Zapp.

The 2019 film Brugklas: De tijd van m'n leven is based on this television series.

== Cast ==
- Britt Scholte as Anouk (S1-5)
- Niek Roozen as Max (S1-5)
- Chloe Maessen as Fien (S1-6)
- Birgit Kunstt as Bo (S4-6)
- May Hollerman (S3-6)
- Edwin Bakker as Mats (S4-5)
- Bickel Krabbe (S3-4)
- Vincent Visser (S6)
- Sterre van Woudenberg (S5-6)
- Sonia Eijken as Safa (S2-6)
- Belle Zimmerman (S2-6)
- Leonard Schoots (S2-4)
- Fleur Verwey as Joy (S5-6)
- Kiek Katerina as Kim (S5-6)
