= Yianna Terzi =

Greek singer and songwriter (born 1980)

Yianna Terzi Γιάννα Τερζή
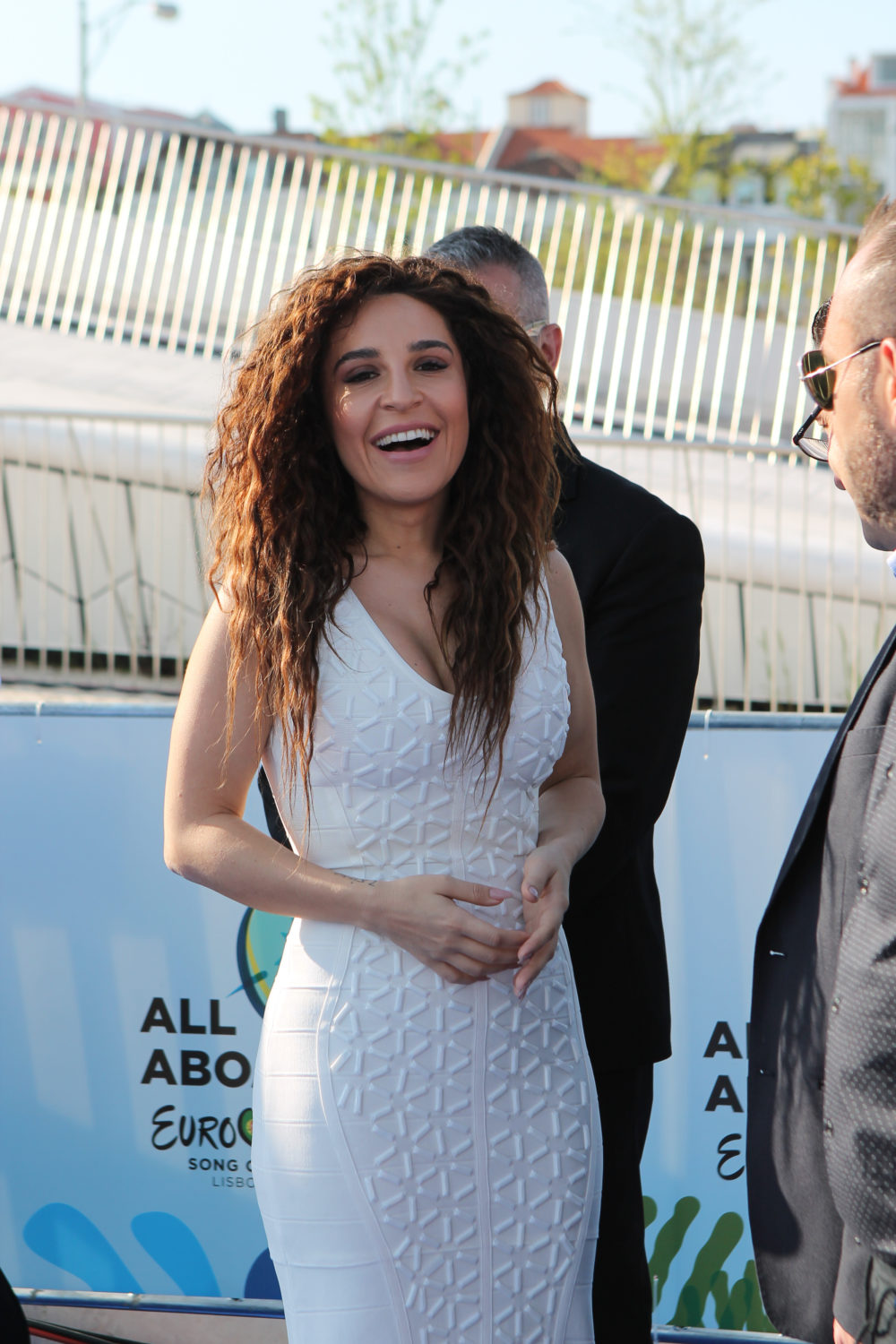
- Terzi at the 2018 Eurovision Song Contest

Background information
- Born: Ioanna Terzi (Ιωάννα Τερζή); 1 December 1980 (age 45); Thessaloniki, Greece
- Genres: Pop; laïko
- Occupations: Singer; songwriter
- Instruments: Vocals; piano
- Years active: 2004–present
- Labels: Minos EMI; Universal Music Greece; Panik Records

Ioanna "Yianna" Terzi (Greek: Ιωάννα "Γιάννα" Τερζή, IPA: [ˈʝana terˈzi]; born 1 December 1980) is a Greek singer and songwriter. She represented Greece in the Eurovision Song Contest 2018 with the song "Oniro mou".

== Biography ==
Terzi was born in 1980 in Thessaloniki, the daughter of Greek singer Paschalis Terzis. At age 20, she moved to Athens to pursue a music career, releasing her first CD single in 2005, and the album Gyrna to kleidi in 2006 through Cobalt Music. She then signed to Minos EMI and released the album Ase me na taxidepso in 2008 along with a single of the same name. Terzi later moved to the United States and worked as a talent scout for Interscope Records.

Terzi was selected as one of the twenty shortlisted artists for the Ellinikós Telikós 2018 with the song "Oniro mou" on 27 October 2017, representing Panik Records. Later, on November 8, she became one of the five acts to be selected to move on to the televised final. Following the disqualification of two of the five acts for not having a "Greek sound", "Oniro mou" entered the top three. On 15 February 2018, it was reported that the record labels for the two other competing artists refused to pay a €20,000 fee to the Greek broadcaster Hellenic Broadcasting Corporation (ERT) and were disqualified from the competition, leaving "Oniro mou" as the only song remaining and the default Greek entry. At the contest, held on 8 May 2018, she placed 14th, failing to qualify for the final. Following the competition, the English version of the song, titled "Eternity" was released.

== Discography ==
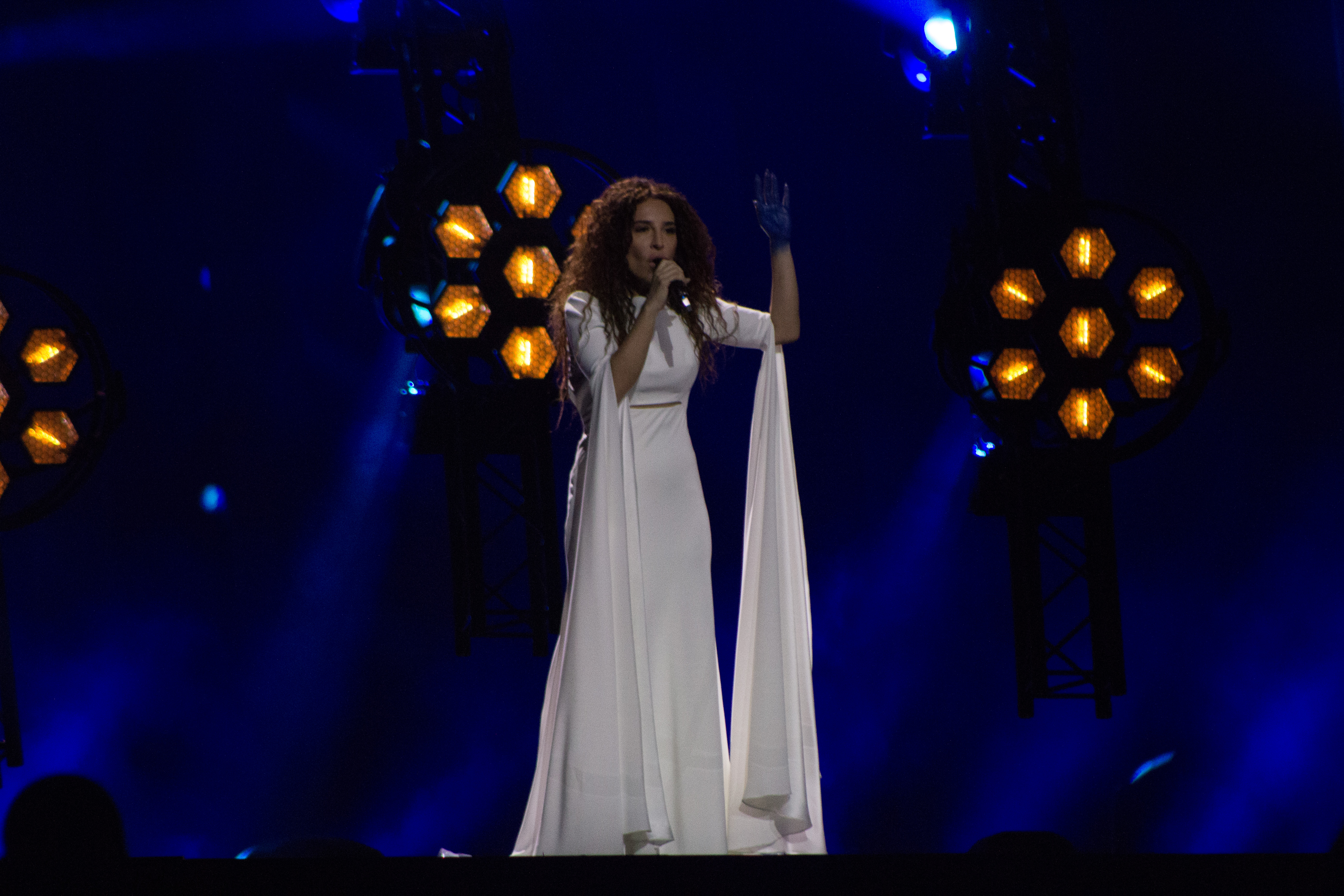
Yianna Terzi during a rehearsal at the Eurovision Song Contest 2018.

=== Studio albums ===
Title	Album details	Peak chart positions
Title	Album details	GRE
Gyrna to kleidi	Released: 1 February 2006; Label: Cobalt Music; Formats: CD, digital download	—
Ase me na taxidepso	Released: 19 May 2008; Label: Minos EMI; Formats: CD, digital download	—

=== Singles ===
Title	Year	Peak chart positions	Album
Title	Year	GRE	Album
"Yianna Terzi"	2005	8	CD single
"Ase me na taxidepso"	2008	—	Ase me na taxidepso
"Apistefto"	2008	—	Ase me na taxidepso
"Oniro mou"	2018	1	Non-album single
"Eternity"	2018	—	Non-album single
"Karma"	2018	16	Non-album single
"Logia Omorfa (Stanga)"	2019	—	Non-album single
"Gia Sena Mono" (featuring Paschalis Terzis)	2020	8	Non-album single
"Selini"	2022	—	Non-album single

Awards and achievements
Preceded by Demy with "This Is Love"	Greece in the Eurovision Song Contest; 2018	Succeeded by Katerine Duska with "Better Love"
