= Scream (Sergey Lazarev song) =

2019 single by Sergey Lazarev

Single by Sergey Lazarev
- Released: 9 March 2019
- Recorded: 2018
- Label: State Television Company
- Songwriters: Sharon Vaughn; Dimitris Kontopoulos
- Producers: Philip Kirkorov; Dimitris Kontopoulos

Sergey Lazarev singles chronology
"Грустные Люди" (2018)	"Scream" (2019)	"Лови" (2019)

Eurovision Song Contest 2019 entry
- Country: Russia
- Artist: Sergey Lazarev
- Language: English
- Composers: Philip Kirkorov; Dimitris Kontopoulos
- Lyricists: Sharon Vaughn; Dimitris Kontopoulos

Finals performance
- Semi-final result: 6th
- Semi-final points: 217
- Final result: 3rd
- Final points: 370

Entry chronology
- ◄ "I Won't Break" (2018)
- "Uno" (2020) ►

"Scream" is a song by Russian singer Sergey Lazarev. It was Russia's entry at the Eurovision Song Contest 2019 in Tel Aviv, Israel. It was performed during the second semi-final on 16 May, and qualified for the final, where it finished in third place with 370 points.

== Eurovision Song Contest ==
The song represented Russia in the Eurovision Song Contest 2019, after Sergey Lazarev was internally chosen by the Russian broadcaster. On 28 January 2019, a special allocation draw was held which placed each country into one of the two semi-finals, as well as which half of the show they would perform in. Russia was placed into the second semi-final, to be held on 16 May 2019, and was scheduled to perform in the second half of the show. Once all the competing songs for the 2019 contest had been released, the running order for the semi-finals was decided by the show's producers rather than through another draw, so that similar songs were not placed next to each other. Russia performed in position 13 and qualified for the final, where it was performed fifth. It finished in third place with 370 points.

== Charts ==
Chart (2019)	Peak position
Lithuania (AGATA)	68
Scotland Singles (OCC)	89
