= Brugklas =

First year of secondary school in Dutch system

Within the Dutch education system, the brugklas (bridge year) is the first year in which a pupil enters who goes from primary school to secondary school. In order to make the transition from primary to secondary education as smooth as possible, the first year often gives a lot of explanation about how to learn and study, for example in a study lesson.

The brugklas is defined as a concept in the so-called Mammoetwet, but the system was already applied before that time. The word 'bridge' here refers to the bridging period between different school levels within a secondary school. For example, in many schools that offer multiple levels (eg vmbo-t, havo, vwo) it is possible to combine these levels into a first year class. Usual combinations are the bridging classes vmbo-t/havo and/or havo/vwo.

After the brugklas the student has to choose the definitive education level. Some schools offer a two- or even three-year "first year class", other schools with several levels do not offer a first year class at all, so in principle the choice in the first year is therefore final. For example, if the pupil is in a havo/vwo bridge class, the educational level is approximately between the level of havo and vwo. The aim of this is that the pupil gets an idea of the level of both levels during the first secondary school year, so that he can make a good choice at which level he belongs. The intention is that in this way the pupils no longer have to retain, but can move on to a less demanding type of education in the event of difficulties. On the other hand, it may surface students whose qualities did not surface clearly at the end of primary school.

Before the introduction of the Mammoetwet, the concept of a bridge year within the secondary education system meant a type of education within primary education, for pupils who, given their age, were not considered mature enough for admission to secondary education. To do this, they usually still had a year of U.L.O. after completing regular primary education. or go through the first grade.
