= Oniro mou =

2018 song performed by Yianna Terzi

Single by Yianna Terzi
- Released: 15 February 2018
- Recorded: 2017
- Genre: Pop; ethno-pop; folk
- Length: 3:04
- Label: Panik Records
- Songwriters: Yianna Terzi; Aris Kalimeris; Dimitris Stamatiou; Mihalis Papathanasiou
- Producers: Yianna Terzi; Aris Kalimeris; Dimitris Stamatiou; Mihalis Papathanasiou

Yianna Terzi singles chronology
"Ase me na taxidepso" (2008)	"Oniro mou" (2018)	"Karma" (2018)

Music video
- "Oniro mou" on YouTube

Eurovision Song Contest 2018 entry
- Country: Greece
- Artist: Gianna Terzi
- Language: Greek
- Composers: Yianna Terzi; Aris Kalimeris; Dimitris Stamatiou; Mihalis Papathanasiou
- Lyricists: Yianna Terzi; Aris Kalimeris; Dimitris Stamatiou; Mihalis Papathanasiou

Finals performance
- Semi-final result: 14th
- Semi-final points: 81

Entry chronology
- ◄ "This Is Love" (2017)
- "Better Love" (2019) ►

Official performance video
- "Oniro mou (First Semi-Final) on YouTube

"Oniro mou" (Greek: Όνειρό μου, romanized: Óneiró mou, lit. 'My dream') is a song performed by Greek singer Yianna Terzi. The song was released as a CD single and digital download on 15 February 2018 through Panik Records, and was written by Terzi along with Aris Kalimeris, Dimitris Stamatiou, and Mihalis Papathanasiou. It represented Greece in the Eurovision Song Contest 2018.

== Eurovision Song Contest ==
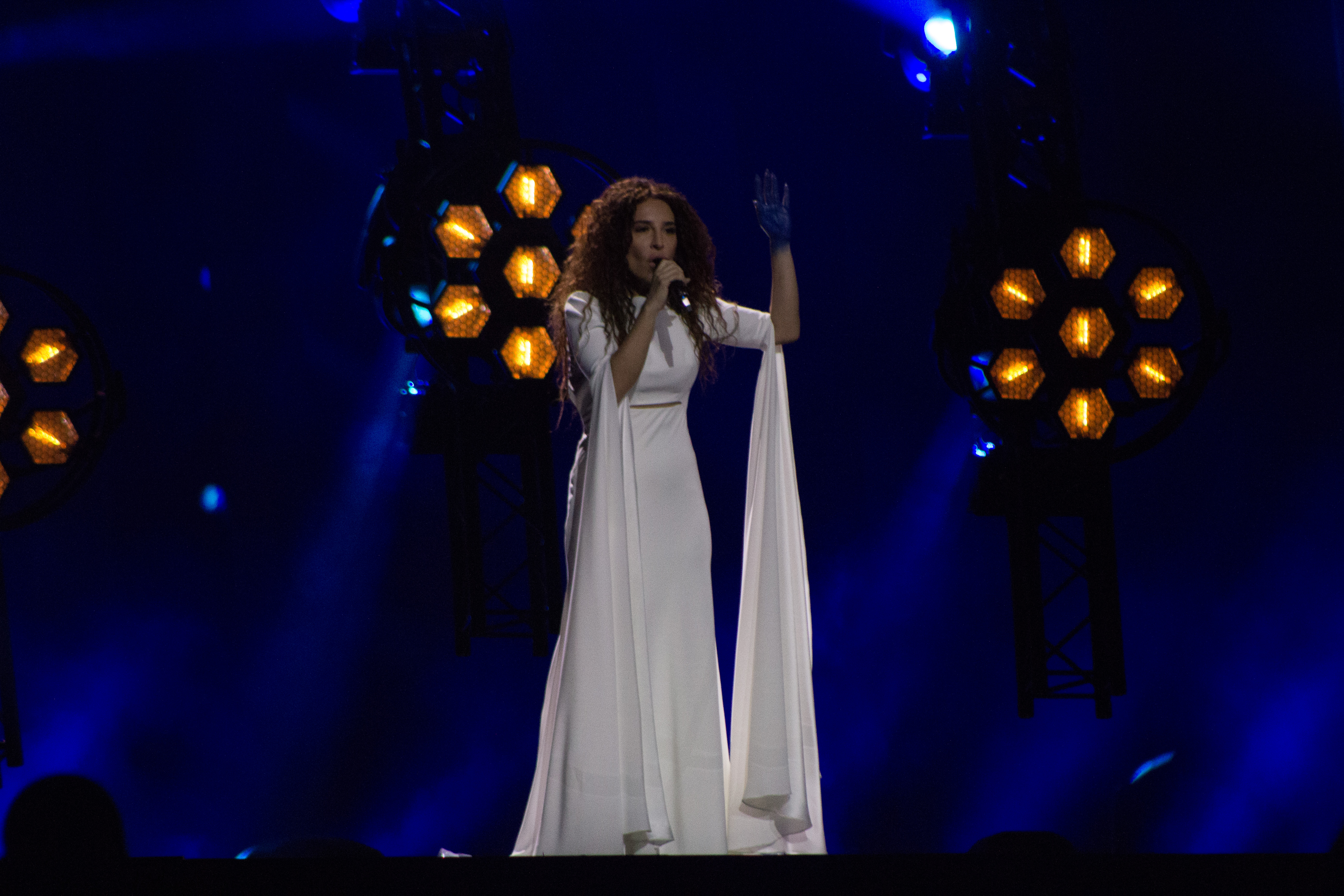
Terzi performing "Oniro mou" during a rehearsal before the first semi-final.

Terzi was selected as one of the twenty shortlisted artists for the Ellinikos Telikos 2018 with the song "Oniro mou” on 27 October 2017, representing Panik Records. Later, on 8 November, she became one of the five acts to be selected to move on to the televised final. Following the disqualification of two of the five acts for not having a "Greek sound", "Oniro mou" entered the top three. On 15 February 2018, it was reported that the record labels for the two other competing artists refused to pay a € 20,000 fee to the Greek broadcaster Hellenic Broadcasting Corporation (ERT) and were disqualified from the competition, leaving "Oniro mou" as the only song remaining and the default Greek entry.

The song competed in the first semi-final, held on 8 May 2018 in Lisbon, Portugal but failed to qualify for the final.

== Music video ==
The music video for "Oniro Mou" directed by Sherif Francis was first presented in 8 March 2018, through a show called Eurovision 2018 - On the Way to Lisbon!, presented by the disqualified contestants from the Greek Final 2018, Duo Fina. There, Terzi and the composers of the song talked about it and she received wishes from former Greek Eurovision contestants.

== Charts ==
=== Weekly charts ===
Chart (2018)	Peak position
Greece (IFPI Greece)	1
Greece (Digital Singles Chart)	1

== Release history ==
Region	Date	Format	Label
Worldwide	15 February 2018	Digital download	Panik Records
