= Storm (Victor Crone song) =

Estonian entry in the Eurovision Song Contest 2019

Single by Victor Crone
- Released: 21 December 2018
- Recorded: 2018
- Genre: Commercial House
- Length: 3:05
- Label: Star Management
- Songwriters: Stig Rästa; Vallo Kikas; Victor Crone; Sebastian Lestapier; Fred Krieger

Victor Crone singles chronology
"Made Of" (2018)	"Storm" (2018)	"Discovery" (2019)

Music video
- "Storm" on YouTube

Eurovision Song Contest 2019 entry
- Country: Estonia
- Artist: Victor Crone
- Language: English
- Composers: Stig Rästa; Vallo Kikas; Victor Crone; Sebastian Lestapier
- Lyricists: Stig Rästa; Victor Crone; Fred Krieger

Finals performance
- Semi-final result: 4th
- Semi-final points: 198
- Final result: 20th
- Final points: 76

Entry chronology
- ◄ "La forza" (2018)
- "What Love Is" (2020) ►

"Storm" is a song performed by Swedish singer Victor Crone. It was co-written/produced by Electronic Producer duo Kisma (one of whom being Stig Rästa, who also wrote the Estonian entries to Eurovision 2015 and 2016). The song represented Estonia at the Eurovision Song Contest 2019 in Tel Aviv. It was performed during the first semi-final on 14 May 2019, and qualified for the final, where it finished in 20th place with 76 points.

== Eurovision Song Contest ==
The song represented Estonia in the Eurovision Song Contest 2019, with Victor Crone being chosen through Eesti Laul 2019, the music competition that selects Estonia's entries for the Eurovision Song Contest. On 28 January 2019, a special allocation draw was held which placed each country into one of the two semi-finals, as well as which half of the show they would perform in. Estonia was placed into the first semi-final, to be held on 14 May 2019, and was scheduled to perform in the second half of the show. Once all the competing songs for the 2019 contest had been released, the running order for the semi-finals was decided by the show's producers rather than through another draw, so that similar songs were not placed next to each other. Estonia performed in position 14 and firmly qualified for the grand final from 4th place with 198 points overall.

At Eurovision, Kaire Vilgats, Dagmar Oja, Kaido Põldma, Lars Gunnar Säfsund and author Stig Rästa joined Crone off-stage as backing singers during the live performance. The actress and singer Saara Kadak, who supported Crone on stage during the Estonian national final, withdrew due to her wedding day and upcoming premiere of the musical West Side Story at the Estonian National Opera.

== Track listing ==
Digital download
No.	Title	Length
1.	"Storm"	3:05

== Charts ==
Chart (2019)	Peak position
Estonia (Eesti Tipp-40)	1
Lithuania (AGATA)	56
Scottish Singles Sales (Official Charts)	56
Sweden (Sverigetopplistan)	39
Switzerland (Schweizer Hitparade)	91
UK Singles Downloads (Official Charts)	59

== Certifications ==
Region	Certification	Certified units/sales
Sweden (GLF)	Gold	4,000,000^{†}
^{†} Streaming-only figures based on certification alone.
