= Better Love (Katerine Duska song) =

2019 single by Katerine Duska

Single by Katerine Duska
- Released: 6 March 2019
- Recorded: 2019
- Length: 3:01
- Label: Minos EMI
- Songwriters: Katerine Duska; Leon of Athens; David Sneddon
- Producer: Phil Cook

Katerine Duska singles chronology
"Won't Leave" (2015)	"Better Love" (2019)	"Anemos" (2019)

Audio sample
- file; help

Music video
- "Better Love" on YouTube

Eurovision Song Contest 2019 entry
- Country: Greece
- Artist: Katerine Duska
- Language: English
- Composers: Katerine Duska; Leon of Athens; David Sneddon; Phil Cook
- Lyricists: Katerine Duska; David Sneddon

Finals performance
- Semi-final result: 5th
- Semi-final points: 185
- Final result: 21st
- Final points: 74

Entry chronology
- ◄ "Oniro mou" (2018)
- "Supergirl" (2020) ►

Official performance video
- "Better Love (First Semi-Final) on YouTube "Better Love (Final) on YouTube

"Better Love" is a song performed by Greek-Canadian singer Katerine Duska. The song represented Greece in the Eurovision Song Contest 2019 in Tel Aviv, where it placed 21st in the final with 74 points. It was released on 6 March 2019.

== Musical and lyrical content ==
"Better Love" was written by Duska, Greek singer-songwriter Leon of Athens, and Scottish singer-songwriter David Sneddon. The song was described by ERT, Greece's competing broadcaster, as a song about higher love, more specifically unconditional and unapologetic love. Duska explained that the song was meant to express a form of invitation, or embrace, to understand about love and what love actually means. The song was written in D-sharp.

== At Eurovision ==
=== Internal selection ===
Duska was announced as the Greek representative at the central news program of ERT on February 14, 2019, while the song title was revealed two days after. The official video clip was shown on 6 March 2019, on a special show for ERT's new program.

=== In Tel Aviv ===
The Eurovision Song Contest 2019 took place at the Expo Tel Aviv in Tel Aviv, Israel and consisted of two semi-finals on 14 and 16 May, and the final on 18 May 2019. According to Eurovision rules, each country, except the host country and the "Big Five" (France, Germany, Italy, Spain and the United Kingdom), was required to qualify from one of two semi-finals to compete for the final; the top ten countries from each semi-final progressed to the final. In January 2019, it was announced that "Better Love" would be performed in the second half of the first semi-final on 14 May 2019. The song was set to perform in running order 16, after Portugal's "Telemóveis" and before San Marino's "Say Na Na Na". It qualified for the final, where it finished in 21st place with 74 points.

== Track listing ==
Digital download
No.	Title	Length
1.	"Better Love"	3:01

== Charts ==
Chart (2019)	Peak position
Greece Local (IFPI)	4
Lithuania (AGATA)	83
