= Dimitris Kontopoulos =

Greek composer, songwriter and record producer

Dimitris Kontopoulos Δημήτρης Κοντόπουλος
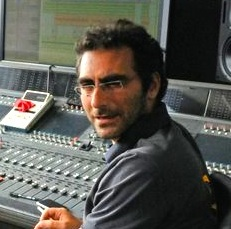
- Kontopoulos in 2009

Background information
- Born: Dimitris T. Kontopoulos; 9 November 1971 (age 54); Athens, Greece
- Genres: Pop; dance-pop
- Occupations: Composer; songwriter; record producer
- Years active: 1999-present
- Label: Major
- Website: dimitriskontopoulos.com

Dimitris T. Kontopoulos (Greek: Δημήτρης Κοντόπουλος; born 9 November 1971) is a Greek composer, songwriter and record producer. His work spans pop music, as well as film and television scores. He is considered one of the most successful composers and producers in the 70-year history of the Eurovision Song Contest, with two entries finishing in third place, two finishing as runners-up, and a winning entry, Bangaranga, at the Eurovision Song Contest 2026.

Kontopoulos has collaborated with numerous Greek recording artists, including Antonis Remos, Despina Vandi, Sakis Rouvas, Anna Vissi, Helena Paparizou and Michalis Hatzigiannis. Outside Greece, he has worked with numerous artists, particularly in the Balkans and Russia, receiving several music industry awards.

== Early life and education ==
Kontopoulos was born in Athens, Greece, on 9 November 1971. After graduating from the Ziridis Educational Institution, he studied film scoring at the University of Southern California in Los Angeles.

== Career ==
=== Greek pop music ===
Kontopoulos became active in the Greek music industry in the late 1990s and early 2000s. His early work included production and composition for Greek pop artists, including Iro, Giannis Vardis and Katy Garbi. He later worked with commercially prominent Greek performers such as Antonis Remos, Despina Vandi, Sakis Rouvas, Anna Vissi, Helena Paparizou and Michalis Hatzigiannis.

His work is generally associated with contemporary Greek pop and dance-pop production. Public broadcaster ERT describes him as having worked with major names in Greek discography and notes that some of his songs have been covered or adapted in countries including Serbia, Bulgaria, Turkey and Israel.

=== Film, television and stage work ===
In addition to pop recordings, Kontopoulos has written music for film and television. ERT notes his collaboration with Greek film director Nikos Perakis. His credits include music connected with Greek film and television productions, including Loufa kai parallagi: Seirines sto Aigaio and other soundtrack work.

Kontopoulos has also been credited with music for stage productions and commercial projects. Because many of these credits are documented mainly through artist biographies and industry databases, detailed claims about individual productions should be kept factual and limited to verifiable titles.

=== Eurovision Song Contest ===
Kontopoulos has had repeated involvement in the Eurovision Song Contest as a composer, songwriter and producer. His Eurovision-related work has included entries for Greece, Cyprus, Ukraine, Bulgaria, Russia, Azerbaijan, Moldova and Belarus.

He is considered one of the most successful composers in the contest's 70-year history, with the majority of his entries finishing in top positions. "Bangaranga", performed by Dara for Bulgaria, had won the contest in 2026. "Shady Lady", performed by Ani Lorak for Ukraine, placed second in 2008. "Hold Me", performed by Farid Mammadov for Azerbaijan, placed second in 2013. "You Are the Only One", performed by Sergey Lazarev for Russia, placed third in 2016 and won the televote. "Scream", also performed by Lazarev, placed third in 2019.

==== Eurovision entries ====
Kontopoulos is best known for his involvement in several Eurovision Song Contest entries.

| Year | Country | Artist | Song | Role | Result | Ref. |
|---|---|---|---|---|---|---|
| 2007 | Belarus | Dmitry Koldun | "Work Your Magic" | Songwriter | 6th, 145 points | |
| 2008 | Ukraine | Ani Lorak | "Shady Lady" | Songwriter/Producer | 2nd, 230 points | |
| 2009 | Greece | Sakis Rouvas | "This Is Our Night" | Songwriter/Producer | 7th, 120 points | |
| 2013 | Azerbaijan | Farid Mammadov | "Hold Me" | Songwriter/Producer | 2nd, 234 points | |
| 2014 | Russia | Tolmachevy Sisters | "Shine" | Songwriter/Producer | 7th, 89 points | |
| 2016 | Russia | Sergey Lazarev | "You Are the Only One" | Songwriter/Producer | 3rd, 491 points | |
| 2017 | Greece | Demy | "This Is Love" | Songwriter/Producer | 19th, 77 points | |
| 2018 | Azerbaijan | Aisel | "X My Heart" | Songwriter/Producer | Semi-final: 11th, 94 points | |
| 2019 | Russia | Sergey Lazarev | "Scream" | Songwriter/Producer | 3rd, 369 points | |
| 2020 | Moldova | Natalia Gordienko | "Prison" | Songwriter/Producer | Contest cancelled | |
| 2020 | Greece | Stefania | "Superg!rl" | Songwriter/Producer | Contest cancelled | |
| 2021 | Moldova | Natalia Gordienko | "Sugar" | Songwriter/Producer | 13th, 115 points | |
| 2021 | Greece | Stefania | "Last Dance" | Songwriter/Producer | 10th, 170 points | |
| 2024 | Cyprus | Silia Kapsis | "Liar" | Songwriter/Producer | 15th, 78 points | |
| 2025 | Cyprus | Theo Evan | "Shh" | Songwriter/Producer | Semi-final: 11th, 44 points | |
| 2026 | Bulgaria | Dara | "Bangaranga" | Songwriter/Producer | 1st, 516 points | |

== Selected production and songwriting credits ==
Kontopoulos has production and songwriting credits on Greek pop releases by artists including Iro, Giannis Vardis, Katy Garbi, Sakis Rouvas, Antonis Remos, Despina Vandi, Helena Paparizou and Michalis Hatzigiannis. Industry databases also list credits across studio albums, singles and soundtrack releases.

Selected credits include:

- Iro – Etsi Ime Ego
- Iro – Apogeiosi
- Giannis Vardis – Pes Mou Ti Niotheis
- Katy Garbi – Emmones Idees
- Sakis Rouvas – Iparhi Agapi Edo
- Sakis Rouvas – This Is My Live
- Sakis Rouvas – Irthes
- Ani Lorak – Solntse
- Sakis Rouvas – Parafora
- Helena Paparizou – Giro Apo T' Oneiro
- Kostas Martakis – Entasi

== Awards and recognition ==
Kontopoulos has received awards and nominations connected with Greek popular music and international pop projects. ERT states that he has worked with major Greek recording artists and has achieved recognition outside Greece through collaborations and song adaptations in other countries.

Eurovision entries associated with Kontopoulos have also received contest-related recognition. "Shady Lady", "Hold Me" and "Bangaranga" received the Marcel Bezençon Artistic Award, while "You Are the Only One" received the Marcel Bezençon Press Award.

== Copyright case ==
In 2023, a Greek media outlet briefly reported that the Areios Pagos had ruled in favour of Azerbaijani composer Eldar Mansurov in a civil copyright dispute concerning Katy Garbi's song "Esena Mono", credited to Kontopoulos, and Mansurov's song "Bayatılar". However, the article was removed a few hours later, and no official ruling confirming the claim has been published. Kontopoulos continues to be credited as the sole composer of "Esena Mono" across all official releases and major music platforms.

== See also ==
- Azerbaijan in the Eurovision Song Contest
- Cyprus in the Eurovision Song Contest
- Greece in the Eurovision Song Contest
- Russia in the Eurovision Song Contest
- List of Eurovision Song Contest entries
