= P.O.P. (EP) =

EP by Marina Satti
- Released: 14 May 2024
- Recorded: 2023–2024
- Genre: Pop; Greek folk
- Length: 27:22
- Language: Greek
- Label: Minos EMI

Marina Satti chronology
| Yenna (2022) | P.O.P. (2024) | POP TOO (2025) |

Singles from P.O.P.
- 1. "Tucutum" Released: 30 June 2023; 2. "Zari" Released: 7 March 2024; 3. "Lalalala" Released: 14 May 2024; 4. "Ah thalassa" Released: 17 July 2024

P.O.P. (Greek: Π.Ο.Π., lit. 'PDO') is the first EP and second record release by Greek musician Marina Satti. It was released on 14 May 2024 by Minos EMI. The songs feature traditional Greek musical elements combined with modern and current styles.

== Background and release ==
P.O.P. (Π.Ο.Π.) is Greek for the protected designation of origin (PDO). On 30 June 2023, Marina Satti released the first single of the EP, "Tucutum". On 24 October 2023, Satti was announced as the Greek representative of the Eurovision Song Contest 2024. She represented her country with "Zari", released on 7 March 2024, and gained the 11th place with a total of 126 points. Three days after performing in the grand final, she released P.O.P. and "Lalalala" as the third single on 14 May 2024. "Ah thalassa" was released as the fourth single on 17 July 2024. The music video for "Ah thalassa" is dedicated to the refugees who have drowned in the Mediterranean Sea and all proceeds of the video were donated to the children refugees of UNHCR, the UN Refugee Agency. In 2024, the music video of “Ah Thalassa”, was awarded the “Best Cultural Impact Award”, at the Berlin Commercial Awards. POP TOO, a sequel album, was released on 25 April 2025, alongside a Pop Tour to support the release, of 25 June 2025.

P.O.P. was a commercial success with songs appearing on the official Greek music chart, IFPI Greece, and the Billboard Greece Chart. Zari was certified as diamond, Lalalala – 3× platinum, Tucutum – platinum, Mixtape – 2× platinum and Ah Thalassa – gold by IFPI Greece. P.O.P was certified 2× platinum by IFPI Greece. In addition it reached the top 10 albums globally on Spotify. It also entered the UK top 10 Spotify albums.

== Critical reception ==
American music critic and YouTuber Anthony Fantano ranked P.O.P. as the sixth-best EP of 2024, saying that, "just when you think you have this project figured out, it hits you with something else that's weird. But simultaneously, the tunes and the production and everything on this record, it's just so bright, it's just so catchy. It's the perfect mix of left field but also accessible." Greek reporter, Christos Vasilakopoulos of Music Hunter writes that, “ Satti does not want to tread on an easy path.” “She wants to do the unexpected, she experiments and offers a specific proposal, for those who can and want to follow.”

== Track listing ==
Standard edition
| No. | Title | Writer(s) | Producer(s) | Length |
|---|---|---|---|---|
| 1. | "Tucutum" | Marina Satti; Loubenski; VLOSPA | Marina Satti; Loubenski | 3:25 |
| 2. | "Zari" | Satti; Gino The Ghost; Jay Stolar; Jordan Palmer; Kay Be; Nick Kodonas; Oge; Solmeister; VLOSPA | Satti; Oge; Kay Be; Nick Kodonas; Sam Tiba; mediopicky; Stathakis; Ermis | 3:01 |
| 3. | "Stin iyia mas" | Anastasios Tsordas; Marios Tsitsopoulos | Satti; Marios Tsitsopoulos; Kodonas; Nikos Choritos; Stathakis; Ermis | 3:21 |
| 4. | "Lalalala" | Satti; Kay Be; Kodonas; mediopicky; Stathakis; Ermis | Satti; Kay Be; Kodonas; mediopicky; Stathakis; Ermis | 2:52 |
| 5. | "Eimai kala!!!!!!!!" | Satti; Katerina Salaka; Kodonas | Satti; Katerina Salaka; Kodonas; Ermis | 0:50 |
| 6. | "Mixtape" (featuring Efi Thodi, Lefteris Pantazis, Nick Kodonas, Oge, RACK and VLOSPA) | Satti; Tsordas; Giota Chalkia; IAMSTRONG; Kay Be; khalil.; Makis Vasileiadis; Kodonas; Oge; RACK; Teo; VLOSPA | Satti; Oga; Kodonas; Kay Be; khalil.; IAMSTRONG; Teo; Loubenski; mediopicky; Monomite; Stathakis; Ermis | 10:32 |
| 7. | "Ah thalassa" | Satti; Ermis; Lena Kitsopoulou; Kodonas | Satti; Kodonas; Ermis; Stathakis | 3:21 |
| Total length: | | | | 27:22 |

Deluxe edition
| No. | Title | Length |
|---|---|---|
| 8. | "Tucutum" (RMX; featuring Mikros Leftis and VLOSPA) | 2:44 |
| 9. | "Stin iyia mas" (Lazy Flow vogue remix) | 2:32 |
| 10. | "Lalalala" (remix; with Oge) | 2:45 |
| 11. | "Ah thalassa" (live at Lycabettus Theatre, Greece / 2024) | 3:41 |

Notes

- All titles stylized in all caps, except "Ah thalassa", which is stylized as "Ah THALASSA".
- "Mixtape" contains a sample of "Glyka glyka" ("Γλύκα γλύκα", 1989), as performed by Efi Thodi.

== Charts ==
Chart performance for P.O.P.
| Chart (2024) | Peak position |
|---|---|
| Greek Albums (IFPI) | 1 |
