= Marina Satti =

Greek singer (born 1986)

Marina Satti Μαρίνα Σάττι
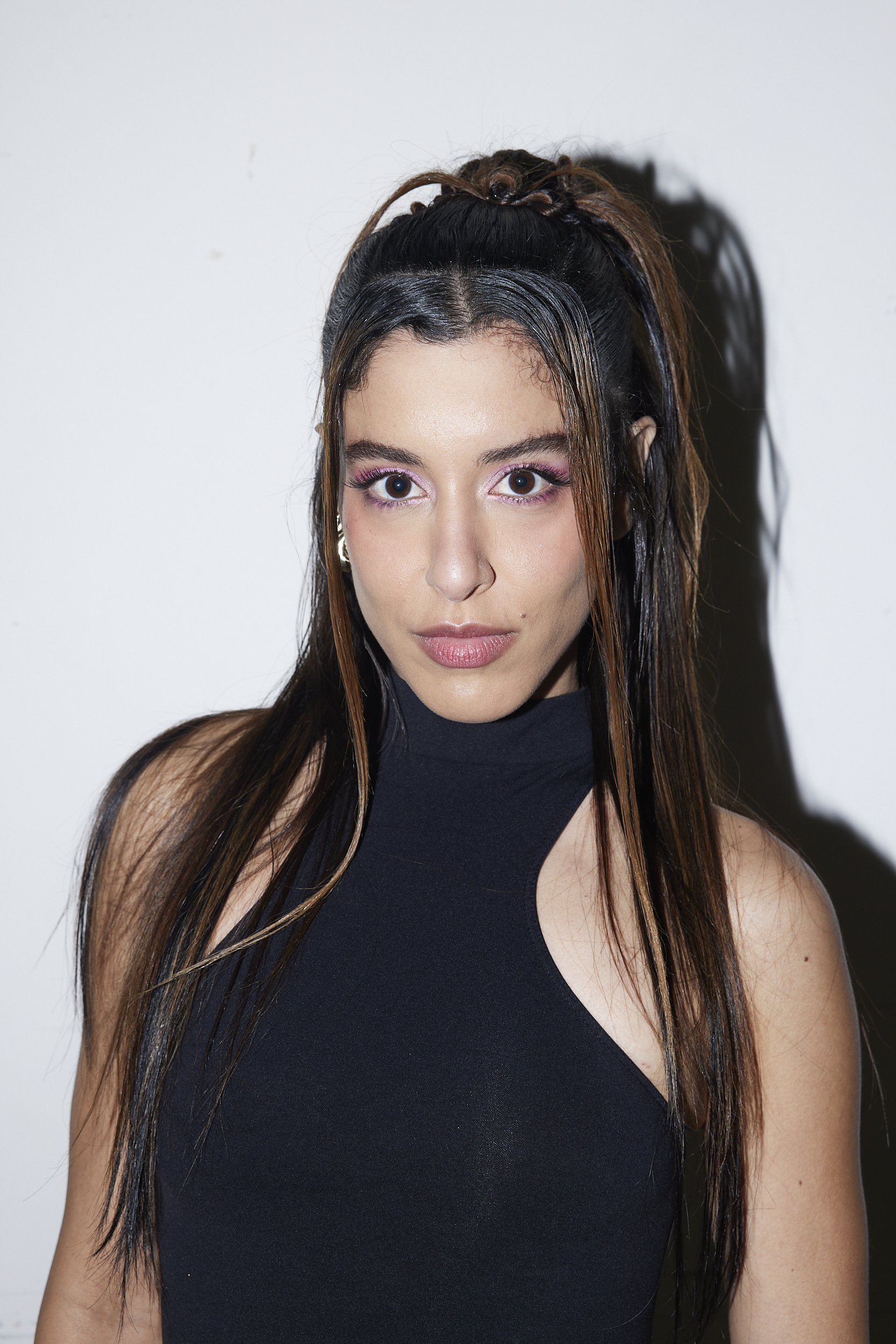
- Satti in 2025

Background information
- Born: 26 December 1986 (age 39); Athens, Greece
- Genres: Art pop; avant-pop; neoperreo; Greek folk; Balkan folk
- Occupations: Singer; composer; music producer; orchestrator
- Instruments: Vocals; piano
- Years active: 2006–present
- Label: Minos EMI
- Partner(s): Orestis Karayannis (2023–2025)
- Website: https://marinasatti.com

Marina Satti (Greek: Μαρίνα Σάττι; born 26 December 1986) is a Greek singer, songwriter, music producer and actress. Her music fuses traditional Greek and Balkan sounds with modern pop, hip-hop, and electronic production. She graduated from the Berklee College of Music in 2012. She released her first single, "Koupes", in 2016 and her first album, YENNA, in 2022. Her albums P.O.P. and POP TOO have reached unprecedented global success, for a Greek artist. Satti represented Greece at the Eurovision Song Contest 2024 with her song "Zari", finishing in 11th place. "Zari" was the first song in Greek to enter music charts outside of Greece.

== Early life and studies ==
Satti was born in Athens and lived there until the age of 6. She was then raised on the island of Crete. Her father, Ali Osman Satti, was a Sudanese Arab anesthesiologist and former professor of the National and Kapodistrian University of Athens. Her mother, Charikleia Filoxenidi, is a chemical engineer from Heraklion, Crete, with Anatolian Greek ancestry. Her parents met at the Faculty of Medicine while studying at the National and Kapodistrian University of Athens. Satti spent all of her childhood in Heraklion, visiting Sudan during the summers. She graduated from school as a top student. She has a brother who lives in England and a half-sister from her father's later marriage to another woman. He had returned to Sudan and later moved to Egypt.

Satti began piano lessons when she was 5 years old at the Apollo Conservatory in Crete. She also sang in several choirs. In 2008, after studying with the baritone Panos Dimas, Satti earned a first degree in lyrical monody with honors and a first prize. One year later, she earned degrees in advanced classical music studies, opera and piano, while also studying jazz at the Nakas Conservatory in Athens. She studied architecture for three years at the National Technical University of Athens. Satti also studied at the Veaki Drama School for one year and the Kentriki Skini Drama School in Athens for one more year on a scholarship. In 2012, she completed a 3-year degree in jazz composition, contemporary writing and production at the Berklee College of Music in Boston, United States, on a scholarship. Among her teachers at Berklee were Jamey Haddad and Danilo Pérez.

In 2024, she started postgraduate studies in the field of cultural management at the Hellenic Open University.

== Career ==
=== 2006–2016: Career beginnings ===
In April 2009, Satti represented Greece and formed part of the European Broadcasting Union's European Jazz Orchestra. She also performed as a singer of the World Jazz Nonet at the John F. Kennedy Center in Washington, D.C. In 2011 she performed along with Bobby McFerrin and the a cappella vocal group Singing Tribe at the Berklee Performance Center. From 2006 to 2024 Satti acted, sang and wrote music for the theatre in 19 plays and 3 television series, in Greece. She sings in 12 languages.

In 2016, Satti founded Fonés ("Voices"), a female a cappella group performing traditional polyphonic songs. Furthermore, she writes music for short films and advertisements. Satti has given her singing voice to 25 cartoons and was the voice of Moana in Moana (2016), Moana 2 (2024), Moana (2026) and Ariel in The Little Mermaid (2023) for Greece. She is also invited to teach music and singing at various schools and universities, in Greece.

=== 2016–2022: Singles and YENNA ===
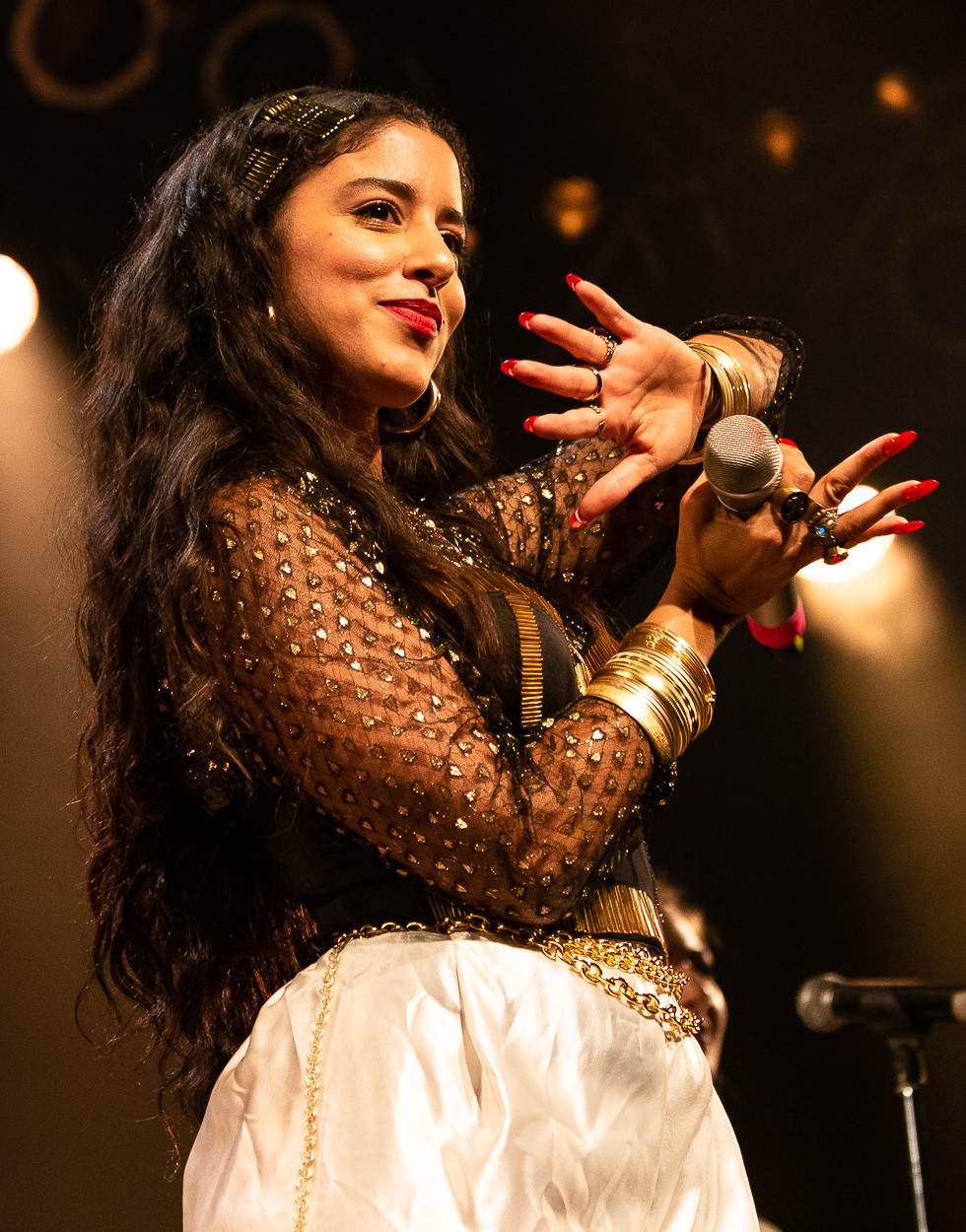
Satti performing at WOMEX 2019

In 2016, Satti released her single "Koupes" ("Cups"), which reached more than 28 million views on YouTube, and was included in Ravin and Bob Sinclar's Buddha Bar 20 Years Anniversary album. In 2017, her next single, "Mantissa" ("Seeress"), charted in the European Union's Official Top 100 and Bulgaria's Top 40. Global Citizen named it "song of the summer." Joanna Kakissis, an Athens-based correspondent for NPR, described it as "the summer hit that fills a generation with hope". Ιt reached more than 58 million views on YouTube. Satti appeared at Google's Europe On Stage, at the Centre for Fine Arts, Brussels, as one of the 10 most interesting YouTube acts of 2017. In 2017, Satti curated a series of cultural events that led to the formation of the choir Chóres (pronounced [ˈkɔɾɛs]; a portmanteau of the Greek words for "daughters" and "chorus"), consisting of 200 women aged 13–63. In 2020, Chóres presented traditional songs at archeological locations. Four years later she created Chordae, a second female choir that performs a classical music repertoire.

In June 2018, Satti and Fonés presented Yalla!, a repertoire of world music and pop compositions, as well as renditions of Eastern Mediterranean traditional music, which was first performed at the Melina Mercouri Theatre and then toured abroad to France, England, Switzerland, as well as to Tampere, Finland, for the 2019 World Music Expo. From 2017 to 2023 Satti toured Europe, the US and Australia, performing at important festivals and programmes, such as the American show KEXP.

In May 2022, she released her debut album YENNA ("Birth"). It became very successful in Greece and was well received abroad. The song "Yiati Pouli’ M", was nominated for Best Alternative Video – Newcomer, at the 2022 UK Music Video Awards. Satti, was invited by the music platforms COLORS and NOWNESS to perform the songs, "Ponos Krifos" and "Yiati Pouli’M". The release of the album was followed by a European tour, that lasted over four months.

=== 2023–2025: Eurovision Song Contest 2024, P.O.P. and POP TOO ===
On 24 October 2023, she was announced as the Greek representative at the Eurovision Song Contest 2024. She was internally selected by the Hellenic Broadcasting Corporation (ERT) and her entry, titled "Zari" ("Dice"), was released on 7 March 2024. She finished in 11th place in the grand final with a total of 126 points. Ιn the finals, the ERT T.V ratings reached the record-breaking 89%.The performance was awarded the "Best Onstage Ensemble 2024 Award", by the Eurovision audience. “Zari”, achieved the 10th place in the ESC Top 250 songs in the history of Eurovision, for 2024 and 2025.

"Zari" reached the top 50 on YouTube global trends. It also reached number 18 on Spotify's Global Top 50, becoming the first song in Greek to do so. Additionally, it achieved number one on Spotify, iTunes, and YouTube trends in Denmark, Greece, Ireland, Norway, the Netherlands, Sweden and the United Kingdom. It also reached charts in 29 countries, including Japan. It received the diamond certification in Greece.

Satti, was the most searched-for person on Google for the year 2024, in Greece.

Following her Eurovision participation, Satti released an extended play (EP) titled P.O.P. ("PDO") containing seven songs, including "Zari" (diamond). The EP features "Tucutum" (platinum), "Stin Iyia Mas", "Lalalala" (3× platinum and Top 200 YouTube Global Trends), "Eimai Kala", a ten-minute track called "Mixtape" (2× platinum) with guest appearances by Lefteris Pantazis, Rack, Efi Thodi, Vlospa, Oge and Nick Kodonas and "Ah Thalassa" (gold). It became a huge success in Greece and was certified 2× platinum. Satti followed this with a six-month tour in Greece and abroad. P.O.P. reached number eight on the top 10 albums globally on Spotify. It also entered the top ten on the UK Spotify chart. The proceeds from the video clip of the song "Ah Thalassa", were donated to the United Nations High Commissioner for Refugees, to support child refugees. Τhe song "Ah Thalassa", was awarded the “Cultural Impact Award”, from the “Berlin Commercial Awards”.

On 18 November 2024, she teased her next single, "Anatoli", on TikTok. It was released on 6 December and was certified double platinum. On 24 January 2025, she released her next single, "Epano sto trapezi". On 24 March 2025, she released her new song "Ela Ela".

On 25 April 2025, she released her second studio album POP TOO, which is the sequel to P.O.P. Ιt contains 10 songs: "Anatoli" (4× platinum), "Lola" (platinum), "Epano Sto Trapezi" (platinum), "Ela Ela" with Saske (2× platinum), "Autokinhto", "Blouzaki" (platinum), "Kavourakia" with Locomondo, "Bye Bye" with Negros Tou Moria, "I Gaga!" and "POP" with Tso. The songs "Lola" and "Epano Sto Trapezi" became number one, making Satti the only Greek female artist to have two number one hits, on YouTube for 2025. "Lola”, reached number 55 on the YouTube World Charts and was nominated for the Best Cinematography in a Video – Newcomer Award, at the 2025 UK Music Video Awards. POP TOO was the bestselling album by a female Greek artist for 2025 and reached charts in more than 50 countries. Satti followed this with a three-month European tour.

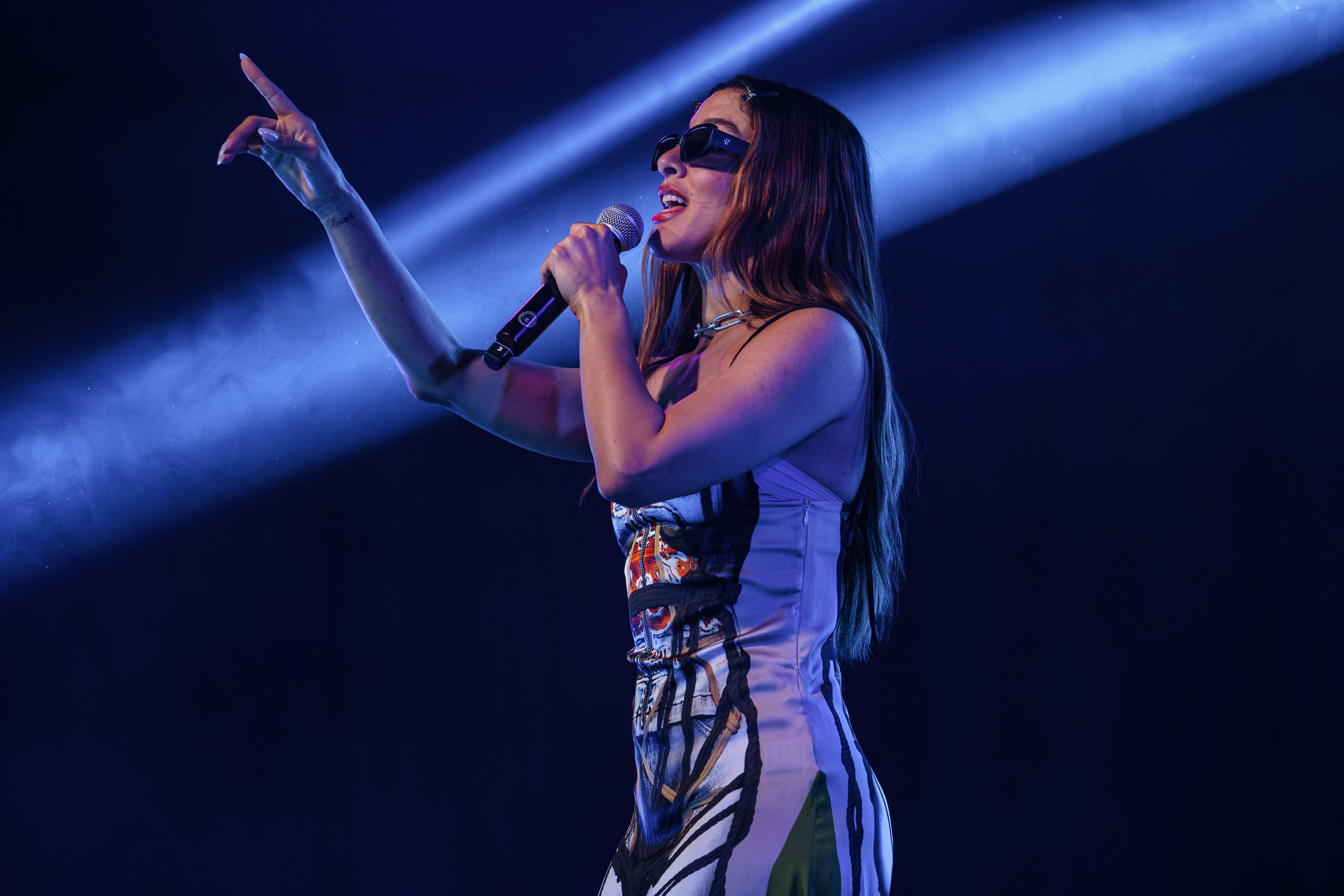
Satti performing at PrepartyEs in 2025

In early May 2025, coinciding with that year's edition of Eurovision, Satti recorded a Greek version of "Saudade, Saudade", which represented Portugal in the Eurovision Song Contest 2022 in Turin, Italy. Satti's version was titled "Fovame" ("I'm Afraid"), and was released on 5 May as part of Spotify Singles. It was featured on curated lists on Spotify and reached playlists in India.

On 13 May 2025, Satti performed in the first semi-final of the Eurovision Song Contest 2025 in Basel, Switzerland, together with three contestants from the previous year of the contest: Jerry Heil of Ukraine, Iolanda of Portugal and Silvester Belt of Lithuania. They performed Celine Dion's "Ne partez pas sans moi", which won Eurovision Song Contest 1988 for Switzerland.

Satti covered the June 2025 edition of Vogue Greece.

On June 16, 2025, at the Mad VMA Awards, she received two awards: “Best Album” for P.O.P. and “Best Pop Adult” for the song “Ah, Thalassa”.

Satti was nominated for the second time in her career at the UK Music Video Awards, the leading institution worldwide for music videos and production. At the 2025 awards, she was nominated for the song Lola in the category Craft & Technical: Best Cinematography in a Video – Newcomer.

2025: COLLABORATIONS

She collaborated on the song, "Cosmos", in Oge's album Status 2, which was released on 11 April 2025. Satti, was featured in the song, “De Fovame”,(gold) in the album, Fthina Tricks 3, by Bloody Hawk, which was released on 30 May 2025. On 29 June, she released three new versions of the song, "Fashion Killah", with Tso as singles. Satti, collaborated with G-KAL and ERMIS on the song, "Τo Dilino", for Greek singer Anastasia's album, San Oniro. On 3 October, together with Lex and Dof Twogee, she was featured in the song, "Paidia tou Feggariou", on the same-titled album by VLOSPA. In November, she collaborated with Bloody Hawk on the song, "Vimata". On 28 November, with Tso, she released the single, "Ipnos".

2026: The post-POP era and new collaborations

On February 2, Satti released the song, “Edo”, with Leon of Athens.

In April, she was nominated for the song, “Epano sto Trapezi” ,at the Berlin Music Video Awards 2026, in the category Best Editor.

In May, Satti held successful concerts in the United States and Canada. On May 28, she sang with her choir Chores, in the “JAMMJAM Athens concert”, which took place at the Temple of the Olympian Zeus, where world-famous musicians such as Ibrahim Maalouf and Desmond Child also performed.

On June 5, she released the song, “A’ti”, an international collaboration between Marina Satti and Palestinian-Jordanian artist Zeyne. The song features Greek and Arabic lyrics and marked the continuation of Satti’s outward-looking artistic trajectory.

On June 17, at the Mad VMA Awards, she received two awards: “Best Album” for POP TOO and “Best Pop” for the song “Lola“.

On July 31 and August 1, Satti sang with her choir Chores, in the music performance, “Choreka- Voices for the Speaking Silences”, in the Theatre of Ancient Epidaurus, in Greece. On September 14, she took part in the concert, “The Street had its on Story”, at the Panathenaic Stadium, which was a tribute to the musician, Manos Loizos.

== Discography ==
=== Studio albums ===
List of studio albums, with selected details
Title	Details
Yenna	Released: 27 May 2022; Label: Walnut Entertainment; Formats: LP, digital download, streaming
Pop Too	Release date: 25 April 2025; Label: Minos EMI; Formats: Digital download, streaming

=== Extended plays ===
List of EPs, with selected details
Title	Details	Peak position	Certifications
Title	Details	GRE	Certifications
P.O.P.	Released: 14 May 2024; Label: Minos EMI; Formats: Digital download, streaming	1	IFPI GRE: 2× Platinum

=== Singles ===
==== As lead artist ====
Title	Year	Peak chart positions					Certifications	Album or EP
Title	Year	GRE	BUL Air.	LTU	SWE Heat.	SWI	Certifications	Album or EP
"Ygro Filli"	2008	—	—	*	—	—		Kyriakodromio
"Mia fora"	2012	—	—	*	—	—		Mia fora
"Ena kalokairi"	2012	—	—	*	—	—		Non-album singles
"Argosvineis moni" (featuring Tareq)	2013	—	—	*	—	—		Non-album singles
"Under the Stars"	2015	—	—	*	—	—		To paidi
"Koúpes"	2016	—	—	*	—	—		Non-album singles
"Nifada"	2017	—	—	*	—	—		Non-album singles
"Mantissa"	2017	1	2	*	—	—		Non-album singles
"Pali"	2021	18	—	—	—	—		Yenna
"Ponos krifos"	2021	—	—	—	—	—		Yenna
"Yiati pouli m' (Den kelaidis)"	2022	—	—	—	—	—		Yenna
"Zeimbekiko II" (with Dionysis Savvopoulos, Mikros Kleftis and Sotiria Bellou)	2023	—	—	—	—	—		Non-album single
"Tucutum"	2023	24	—	—	—	—	IFPI GRE: Platinum	P.O.P.
"Zari"	2024	1	—	20	10	99	IFPI GRE: Diamond	P.O.P.
"Lalalala"	2024	1	—	—	—	—	IFPI GRE: 3× Platinum	P.O.P.
"Ah thalassa"	2024	16	—	—	—	—	IFPI GRE: Gold	P.O.P.
"Anatoli"	2024	4	—	—	—	—	IFPI GRE: 4× Platinum	Pop Too
"Epano sto trapezi"	2025	6	—	—	—	—	IFPI GRE: Platinum	Pop Too
"Ela Ela" (with Saske)	2025	3	—	—	—	—	IFPI GRE: 2× Platinum	Pop Too
"Lola"	2025	4	—	—	—	—	IFPI GRE: Platinum	Pop Too
"Fovame" (Spotify Singles)	2025	—	—	—	—	—		Non-album singles
"Fashion Killah" (with Tso)	2025	—	—	—	—	—		Non-album singles
"Ipnos" (with Tso)	2025	—	—	—	—	—		Non-album singles
"A'ti" (with Zeyne)	2026	8	—	—	—	—		Non-album singles
"—" denotes a recording that did not chart or was not released in that territory. " * " denotes that the chart did not exist at that time.

==== As featured artist ====
Title	Year	Album or EP
"To magazaki tou tromou” (featuring Antigoni Psychrami, Artemis Zannou and Marina Satti)	2007	To magazaki tou tromou
"Ola allazoun magika".”Kato”. “Finale Proto Meros”.”Prin Nane Arga”.”Kenourgio Magazaki.” (featuring Antigoni Psychrami, Artemis Zannou, Marina Satti and Hristos Valavanidis)	2007	To magazaki tou tromou
"Galazia rapsodia" (Philippos Peristeris featuring Marina Satti)	2008	Epyllia
"Ordinary People" (Jorge Perez featuring Martin Nessi, Daniel Garcia and Marina Satti)	2011	From the Boiler Room
"Your Star" (Tareq featuring Marina Satti) “To Tragoudi ton Sirinon” (featuring Marina Satti and Maria Grampsa). ”Milo tin Glossa tou Nerou” (featuring Marina Satti). “O Misoboukitsas O Paramithas“. “Maresi Naho Filous”. “Stin Megali Othoni”. “Signomi”. “Ksero Kala Na Tragoudo”. “Pistevo Ston Eafto Mou”. (Yiannis Zouganellis featuring Marina Satti, Alexandros Zouganellis, Angelos Chronas). ”Viastiko Pouli tou Notou” (Stathis Drogosis featuring Marina Satti and Fones)	2013 2015 2016 2017	Fish O Iasonas Kai To Chrisomalo Deras O Diaforetikos Misoboukitsas Viastiko Pouli tou Notou
"Thelo na se xeperaso" (Phoebus Delivorias featuring Marina Satti, Fones and Stathis Dragosis)	2018	I taratsa tou fivou
"Edo (Tropical Remix)" (Monsieur Minimal featuring Marina Satti)	2018	Εrotica
"Ti pathos" (George Dalaras featuring Marina Satti)	2020	Ta mousika genethlia – Duets (Live at Herod Atticus Odeon)
"Nihta" (George Dalaras featuring Marina Satti and Fones)	2020	Ta mousika genethlia – Duets (Live at Herod Atticus Odeon)
"Chichovite konye (Remix)" (Boombastiko featuring Marina Satti)	2021	Boombastiko
"Neraida methismeni (Hromata)" (Eleonora Zouganeli featuring Marina Satti)	2021	Parto allios
"To aroma" (Onirama featuring Marina Satti)	2021	Anthologio gia mikrous ke megalous
"Cosmos" (Oge featuring Marina Satti)	2025	Status 2
"De fovame" (Bloody Hawk featuring Marina Satti)”Ta Paidia Tou Feggariou”(Vlospa featuring Marina Satti, Lex and Dof Twogee) “Vimata”(Bloody Hawk featuring Marina Satti)	2025	Fthina Tricks 3 Ta Paidia Tou Feggariou Non-album single

=== Other charted songs ===
Title	Year	Peak chart positions	Certifications	Album
Title	Year	GRE	Certifications	Album
"Spirto ke venzini"	2022	26	IFPI GRE: Platinum	Yenna
"Mixtape" (featuring Lefteris Pantazis, Vlospa, Oge, Rack, and Efi Thodi)	2024	2	IFPI GRE: 2× Platinum	P.O.P.
"Stin iyia mas"	2024	28	IFPI GRE: Gold	P.O.P.
"Eimai kala!!!!!!!!"	2024	48		P.O.P.
"Zari" (Instrumental)	2024	89		Zari
"Autokinhto"	2025	41		Pop Too
"Blouzaki"	2025	6	IFPI GRE: Platinum	Pop Too
"Kavourakia" (featuring Locomondo)	2025	29		Pop Too
"Bye Bye" (featuring Negros tou Moria)	2025	35		Pop Too
"IGaga!"	2025	76		Pop Too
"Pop (All the Voices in My Head)" (featuring Tso)	2025	37		Pop Too

== Awards and nominations ==
Year	Award	Category	Nominee(s)	Result	Ref.
2018	MAD Video Music Awards	Video of the Year	"Mantissa"	Nominated	
2018	MAD Video Music Awards	Best Female (Modern)	Herself	Nominated	
2022	MAD Video Music Awards	Game Changer Award	Herself	Nominated	
2022	MAD Video Music Awards	Best Pop Video	"Pali"	Nominated	
2022	UK Music Video Awards	Best Alternative Video – Newcomer	"Yiati Pouli'M"	Nominated	
2024	MAD Video Music Awards	Best Dance Video	"Zari"	Nominated	
2024	MAD Video Music Awards	Best Pop Artist	Herself	Won	
2024	Eurovision Awards	Best Onstage Ensemble	Herself	Won	
2024	Berlin Commercial Awards	Cultural Impact Award	“Ah Thalassa”	Won	
2024	Berlin Commercial Awards	Best Video; Best Direction; Best Idea	“Ah Thalassa”	Nominated	
2025	MAD Video Music Awards	Best Dance Video	“Lalalala”	Nominated	
2025	MAD Video Music Awards	Song of the Year – Digital	“Lalalala”	Nominated	
2025	MAD Video Music Awards	Best Performer	Herself	Nominated	
2025	MAD Video Music Awards	Best Pop Artist – Adult	“Ah Thalassa”	Won	
2025	MAD Video Music Awards	Video of the Year	“Ah Thalassa”	Nominated	
2025	MAD Video Music Awards	Album of the Year	P.O.P.	Won	
2025	UK Music Video Awards	Best Cinematography Video – Newcomer	“Lola”	Nominated	
2026	Berlin Music Video Awards	Best Editor	"Epano Sto Trapezi"	Nominated	
2026	MAD Video Music Awards	Best Pop/ Best Album/	“Lola” POP TOO	Won Won	
2026	MAD Video Music Awards	Video of the Year/ Best Ballad/ Best Performer/ Best duet(with Saske)	“Lola”/ Anatoli/ “Ela Ela”	Nominated	

== Theatre ==
Satti has worked as an actress and a music score composer with the National Theatre of Greece, the Greek National Opera, the Athens Festival, and others. Satti has performed in the Ancient Theatre of Epidaurus and the Odeon of Herodes Atticus.

Theatre
Year	Title	Role	Notes	Refs.
2006	Little Shop of Horrors	Greek chorus	acting/singing	
2012	Saint Joan of the Stockyards	Music	music teaching	
2013	Trachiniae	Chorus	acting/singing	
2013	Daimones	Student	acting/singing	
2013	Dragon (based on Lancelot all play-in English)	Elsa- acting/ singing/ music teaching	acting/singing	
2014	Shrek the Musical	Princess Fiona	acting/singing	
2014	Hippolytus	Chorus	acting/singing	
2015	Jason and the Golden Fleece	Medea/Siren/Figurehead	acting/singing	
2015	Ecclesiazusae	Chorus	acting/singing	
2015	Fiddler on the Roof	Chava	acting/singing	
2016	West Side Story (songs- in English)	Maria	acting/singing	
2016	Gulliver's Travels	Music	music writing/ teaching	
2016	As you Like It	Music	music writing/ teaching	
2018	Prometheus Bound	Chorus- acting/ singing	music writing/ teaching	
2018	Once	Girl	acting/singing	
2019	The Children's Hour	Music	music writing/ direction	
2019	Erotokritos	Aretousa	acting/singing	
2019	Medea	Music direction	acting/singing	
2024	The Suppliants	Artemis/Aphrodite	acting/singing	

== Filmography ==
Films
Year	Title	Role	Notes and Awards	Refs.
2007	Shrek the Third	Choir	Songs	
2008	The Little Mermaid: Ariel's Beginning	Ariel	Songs	
2008	Barbie & the Diamond Castle	Melody	Songs	
2008	Barbie in a Christmas Carol	Choir	Songs	
2009	Bolt	Soloist singer	Songs	
2009	Tinker Bell and the Lost Treasure	Soloist singer	Songs	
2009	Barbie and the Three Musketeers	Soloist singer	Songs	
2010	Monster High: New Ghoul at School	Singer	Songs	
2011	Mermaid Melody Pichi Pichi Pitch	Additional voices Singer	Songs	
2011	Phineas and Ferb the Movie: Across the 2nd Dimension	Singer	Songs	
2011	Happy Feet Two	Choir	Songs	
2011	A.N.T. Farm	Singer	Songs	
2012	The Lorax	Mrs. Wiggins; Choir	Songs	
2012	Brave	Choir	Songs	
2014	Tinker Bell and the Pirate Fairy	Soloist singer	Songs	
2014	My Little Pony: Equestria Girls	Singer; Choir	Songs	
2015	Barbie in Rock'n Royals	Choir	Songs	
2015	My Little Pony: Equestria Girls – Rainbow Rocks	Twilight Sparkle; Rainbow Dash	Songs	
2016	Moana	Moana	Dialogues; Songs	
2017	Mickey and the Roadster Races Mickey Mouse Mixed-Up Adventures	Opening credits Soloist	Songs	
2017	Beauty and the Beast	Choir	Songs	
2018	Ralph Breaks the Internet	Moana	Songs	
2023	The Little Mermaid	Ariel	Dialogues; Songs	
2024	Moana 2	Moana	Dialogues; Songs	
2026	Moana	Moana	Dialogues Songs	
Television
Year	Title	Role	Notes	Refs.
2008–2009	Γ4 (G4)	Marina	9 episodes	
2011–2012	Steps	Eva	20 episodes	
2021	The Voice of Greece	Battle Advisor	Advisor to Sakis Rouvas team	
2023	Ta Noumera	Lysistrata	1 episode	

Awards and achievements
Preceded by Victor Vernicos with "What They Say"	Greece in the Eurovision Song Contest; 2024	Succeeded by Klavdia with "Asteromata"
