= Greece in the Eurovision Song Contest 2025 =

- Eurovision Song Contest 2025
- Participating broadcaster: Hellenic Broadcasting Corporation (ERT)
- Country: Greece
- Selection process: Ethnikós Telikós 2025
- Selection date: 30 January 2025

Competing entry
- Song: "Asteromata"
- Artist: Klavdia
- Songwriters: Arcade; Klavdia Papadopoulou

Placement
- Semi-final result: Qualified (4th, 112 points)
- Final result: 6th, 231 points

Participation chronology

Greece was represented at the Eurovision Song Contest 2025 with the song "Asteromata", written by Arcade and Klavdia and performed by Klavdia herself. The Greek participating broadcaster, the Hellenic Broadcasting Corporation (ERT), organised the national final Ethnikós Telikós 2025 in order to select its entry for the contest.

Greece was drawn to compete in the second semi-final of the Eurovision Song Contest which took place on 15 May 2025; it was later selected to perform in position 7. At the end of the show, Greece was announced among the top 10 entries of the second semi-final and hence qualified to compete in the final. It was later revealed that Greece placed 4th out of the 16 participating countries in the semi-final with 112 points. In the final, Greece performed in position 17 and placed 6th out of the 26 performing countries, scoring a total of 231 points and giving Greece its best result since 2013.

== Background ==
Prior to the 2025 contest, Greece had participated in the Eurovision Song Contest 44 times since its debut in 1974. The nation has won the contest once to this point, in 2005 with the song "My Number One" performed by Helena Paparizou. Following the introduction of semi-finals for the 2004 contest, it managed to qualify for the final with each of its entries for several years. Between 2004 and 2013, it achieved nine top ten placements in the final. The first entry to not qualify to the final was "Utopian Land" performed by Argo in 2016. Its 16th-place finish in the semi-final marked its worst placing at the contest and led to its absence from the final for the first time since 2000, when it did not send an entry. In the 2018 contest, it failed to qualify for the second time with "Oniro mou" by Yianna Terzi, finishing 14th in the semi-final. After failing to qualify for final for the third time in 2023 with "What They Say" by Victor Vernicos, it returned to the final in 2024 with "Zari" by Marina Satti, placing 11th with 126 points.

As part of its duties as participating broadcaster, the Hellenic Broadcasting Corporation (ERT) organises the selection of its entry in the Eurovision Song Contest and broadcasts the event in the country. ERT's predecessor, the National Radio Television Foundation (EIRT), debuted in the contest in 1974 and then ERT participated from 1975 until 2013, when the broadcaster was shut down by a government directive. It was replaced firstly with the interim Dimosia Tileorasi (DT) and then later by the New Hellenic Radio, Internet and Television (NERIT) broadcaster, before reverting to the ERT name by the new government in June 2015. The Greek broadcasters over the years had selected their entries both internally and through the national final format Ellinikós Telikós. ERT confirmed its intention to participate in the 2025 contest on 14 September 2024, and announced on 18 September that a national final would be organised for the first time since 2017 to select its representative.

== Before Eurovision ==
=== Ethnikós Telikós 2025 ===
Ethnikós Telikós 2025 (Εθνικός Τελικός) was the national final developed by ERT to select its entry for the Eurovision Song Contest 2025. The competition took place on 30 January 2025 at the Christmas Theater in Galatsi, hosted by Sakis Rouvas (who represented Greece in 2004 and in 2009 and hosted Eurovision 2006) and Helena Paparizou (who represented Greece in 2001 as part of Antique, and won in 2005), with Fokas Evangelinos serving as the artistic director. The show was broadcast on ERT1, ERT World, Second Programme and Voice of Greece, as well as online on ERT's over-the-top media service ERTFLIX International and the Eurovision Song Contest's official YouTube channel. The national final was watched by 833,000 viewers in Greece with a market share of 18.3%, making it the highest rated show of that day.

==== Competing entries ====
On 18 October 2024, ERT opened a submission period where artists and composers were able to submit their entries for consideration by the broadcaster by 10 November 2024. Artists were required to be Greek citizens, be permanent residents in Greece or be of Greek descent, while songwriters could be of any nationality and submit up to two songs. 187 songs were received by the submission deadline and a seven-member jury selected twelve entries to participate in the national final alongside three backup entries. The jury consisted of Michalis Hatzigiannis (composer and singer), Yiannis Dimitriadis (journalist and radio producer), Kleopatra Eleftheriadou (soprano and actress), Stefania (singer), Nektarios Tyrakis (lyricist), Maria Hatzigianni (director) and Dimitris Chorianopoulos (music producer). The competing entries were revealed on 10 January 2025 during the ERT1 show Proian se eidon; Salina Gavala and Tsiak were disqualified before the scheduled announcement as they had previously made the title of their song public, which went against the rules of the competition, and were replaced by Nafsica Gavrilaki. Among the selected competing artists was Constantinos Christoforou who previously represented Cyprus in 1996, 2002, and 2005, as well as Xannova Xan, who previously represented Greece in the Junior Eurovision Song Contest 2005 as Kalli.

Entry disqualified Replacement entry

Ethnikós Telikós 2025 contestants
Artist	Song	Songwriter(s)
Andy Nicolas	"Lost My Way"	Andreas Koutsonikolas; Tim Aeby
Barbz	"Sirens"	Barbara Argyrou; Emil Vogel
Constantinos Christoforou and Kostas Karafotis	"Paradeisos" (Παράδεισος)	Constantinos Christoforou; Rodoula Papalamprianou
Dinamiss	"Odyssey"	Eleni Dina; Maria Dina
Evangelia	"Vale" (Βάλε)	Evangelia Psarakis; Gino "the Ghost" Borri; Jay Stolar; Jordan Palmer; Solmeister; Stelios Vamvakas
Georgina Kalais and John Vlaseros	"High Road"	Georgina Kalaitzoglou; Yiannis Vlaseros
Klavdia	"Asteromata" (Αστερομάτα)	Arcade
Kostas Ageris	"Gi mou" (Γη μου)	Kostas Ageris
Nafsica Gavrilaki	"Unhurt Me"	Dimitrios Koubis; Nafsica Gavrilaki
Rikki	"Elevator (Up and Down)"	Anton Aerts; Apostolis Mallias; Konstantinos Katikaridis
~~Salina Gavala and Tsiak~~	~~"Tha matho na agapo" (Θα μάθω να αγαπώ)~~	Babis Stokas; Panagiotis Tsiakalakis
Thanos Lambrou	"Free Love"	Andreas Georgiou; Andreas Vasiliou; Thanos Lambrou
Xannova Xan	"Play It!"	Dimitri Stassos; Freja Blomberg; Kalli Georgellis; Maria Broberg; Peter Boström

Backup entries
Artist	Song	Songwriter(s)
~~Nafsica Gavrilaki~~	~~"Unhurt Me"~~	Dimitrios Koubis; Nafsica Gavrilaki
Panagiotis Tsakalakos	"Money (Priceless Love)"	Christos Ioannidis; Panagiotis Tsakalakos
Stavros Salampasopoulos	"Superhero"	Christina Koilani; Stavros Salampasopoulos

==== Final ====
The final took place on 30 January 2025, with the running order decided by a draw on 20 January. Twelve songs competed and the winner, "Asteromata" performed by Klavdia, was selected by a combination of public voting conducted through SMS (50%), Greek jury voting (25%) and international jury voting (25%). The Greek jury consisted of Michalis Hatzigiannis (composer and singer), Jenny Melita (journalist and presenter), Fotis Sergoulopoulos (presenter), Margarita Mytilineou (director of the radio stations Ellinikos and Pride) and Giannis Christodoulopoulos (composer), while the international jury consisted of Martin Holmen (presenter and radio producer at NRK), Olivier Auclair (Head of Entertainment at RTBF), Léa Ivanne (French singer-songwriter and vocal coach), Wilkin William Edmund Roy (director of music programmes at the BBC) and Simona Martorelli (director of International Relations and European Affairs at RAI).

In addition to the performances of the competing entries, the show was opened by hosts Sakis Rouvas and Helena Paparizou performing three Eurovision entries accompanied by an orchestra: "Waterloo" (Sweden 1974), "Hold Me Now" (Ireland 1987), and "Krassi, thalassa ke t' agori mou" (Greece 1974), followed by Marina Satti (who represented Greece in 2024) performing her entry "Zari". During the interval, Rouvas performed his entries, "Shake It" (2004) and "This Is Our Night" (2009), Paparizou performed her entries "Die for You" (2001) and "My Number One" (2005), and Theo Evan (who would represent Cyprus in 2025) performed "Fuego", the song which represented Cyprus in 2018.

Final – 30 January 2025
R/O	Artist	Song	Jury		Televote	Total	Place
R/O	Artist	Song	Greek	Intl.	Televote	Total	Place
1	Rikki	"Elevator (Up and Down)"	8	4	2	14	7
2	Thanos Lambrou	"Free Love"	1	7	4	12	9
3	Kostas Ageris	"Gi mou"	7	1	10	18	6
4	Andy Nicolas	"Lost My Way"	3	5	0	8	10
5	Klavdia	"Asteromata"	12	8	24	44	1
6	Constantinos Christoforou and Kostas Karafotis	"Paradeisos"	5	0	8	13	8
7	Georgina Kalais and John Vlaseros	"High Road"	0	2	6	8	10
8	Barbz	"Sirens"	6	10	14	30	3
9	Evangelia	"Vale"	10	12	20	42	2
10	Dinamiss	"Odyssey"	4	4	16	24	4
11	Nafsica Gavrilaki	"Unhurt Me"	0	0	0	0	12
12	Xannova Xan	"Play It!"	2	6	12	20	5

== At Eurovision ==
The Eurovision Song Contest 2025 took place at St. Jakobshalle in Basel, Switzerland, and consisted of two semi-finals, which were held on the respective dates of 13 and 15 May, with the final on 17 May 2025. During the allocation draw held on 28 January 2025, Greece was drawn to compete in the second semi-final, performing in the first half of the show. At the grand final, Greece, competed at the 17th position and firstly gained 8th place (105 points), on only the final jury votes, and finally 6th place ( + 126 points), with/from the votes of the public.

=== Voting ===
==== Points awarded to Greece ====
Points awarded to Greece (Semi-final 2)
Score	Televote
12 points	Armenia
10 points	Germany; Luxembourg; Montenegro; Serbia
8 points	Israel; Malta
7 points	Austria; France; Rest of the World
6 points	
5 points	Australia; Georgia
4 points	Czechia; Denmark
3 points	United Kingdom
2 points	
1 point	Finland; Ireland

Points awarded to Greece (Final)
Score	Televote	Jury
12 points	Albania; Cyprus; San Marino	Australia; Cyprus; Israel; Montenegro
10 points	Germany; Luxembourg	Malta
8 points	Armenia; Serbia	France
7 points	Australia; Israel; Rest of the World; Switzerland	
6 points	Belgium	Albania; Germany; Serbia
5 points	Netherlands	Georgia
4 points	France; Montenegro	Croatia; Poland
3 points	Sweden	Finland; Ireland
2 points	Italy; United Kingdom	
1 point		Portugal; United Kingdom

==== Points awarded by Greece ====
Points awarded by Greece (Semi-final 2)
Score	Televote
12 points	Israel
10 points	Austria
8 points	Armenia
7 points	Luxembourg
6 points	Malta
5 points	Georgia
4 points	Lithuania
3 points	Latvia
2 points	Finland
1 point	Serbia

Points awarded by Greece (Final)
Score	Televote	Jury
12 points	Albania	France
10 points	Austria	Austria
8 points	Estonia	Netherlands
7 points	Israel	Sweden
6 points	Netherlands	Switzerland
5 points	France	Germany
4 points	Norway	Italy
3 points	Germany	Armenia
2 points	Armenia	Albania
1 point	Sweden	Israel

==== Detailed voting results ====
Each participating broadcaster assembles a five-member jury panel consisting of music industry professionals who are citizens of the country they represent. Each jury, and individual jury member, is required to meet a strict set of criteria regarding professional background, as well as diversity in gender and age. No member of a national jury was permitted to be related in any way to any of the competing acts in such a way that they cannot vote impartially and independently. The individual rankings of each jury member as well as the nation's televoting results were released shortly after the grand final.

The following members comprised the Greek jury:

- George Polychroniou
- Ioannis Vasilopoulos
- Vangelis Konstantinidis
- Margarita Mitilinaiou
- Mirela Pachou

Detailed voting results from Greece (Semi-final 2)
R/O	Country	Televote	
R/O	Country	Rank	Points
01	Australia	14	
02	Montenegro	15	
03	Ireland	12	
04	Latvia	8	3
05	Armenia	3	8
06	Austria	2	10
07	Greece		
08	Lithuania	7	4
09	Malta	5	6
10	Georgia	6	5
11	Denmark	11	
12	Czechia	13	
13	Luxembourg	4	7
14	Israel	1	12
15	Serbia	10	1
16	Finland	9	2

Detailed voting results from Greece (Final)
R/O	Country	Jury							Televote	
R/O	Country	Juror A	Juror B	Juror C	Juror D	Juror E	Rank	Points	Rank	Points
01	Norway	11	23	22	14	18	22		7	4
02	Luxembourg	22	16	4	15	16	14		16	
03	Estonia	5	19	20	6	25	12		3	8
04	Israel	16	7	7	19	7	10	1	4	7
05	Lithuania	23	25	24	25	21	25		12	
06	Spain	13	10	19	10	20	16		14	
07	Ukraine	21	22	21	24	10	23		19	
08	United Kingdom	9	24	15	23	17	20		23	
09	Austria	1	3	2	3	2	2	10	2	10
10	Iceland	17	9	16	18	15	17		13	
11	Latvia	25	13	13	22	4	13		21	
12	Netherlands	2	2	10	2	11	3	8	5	6
13	Finland	10	17	11	21	24	18		15	
14	Italy	19	14	5	9	5	7	4	11	
15	Poland	18	20	18	17	22	24		18	
16	Germany	4	12	9	11	6	6	5	8	3
17	Greece									
18	Armenia	7	5	23	8	12	8	3	9	2
19	Switzerland	20	4	8	20	1	5	6	20	
20	Malta	6	18	12	5	23	11		17	
21	Portugal	24	15	14	12	13	19		24	
22	Denmark	14	8	17	13	14	15		25	
23	Sweden	8	6	3	4	9	4	7	10	1
24	France	3	1	1	1	3	1	12	6	5
25	San Marino	15	11	25	16	19	21		22	
26	Albania	12	21	6	7	8	9	2	1	12
