= Klavdia (singer) =

Greek singer (born 2002)

Klavdia Κλαυδία
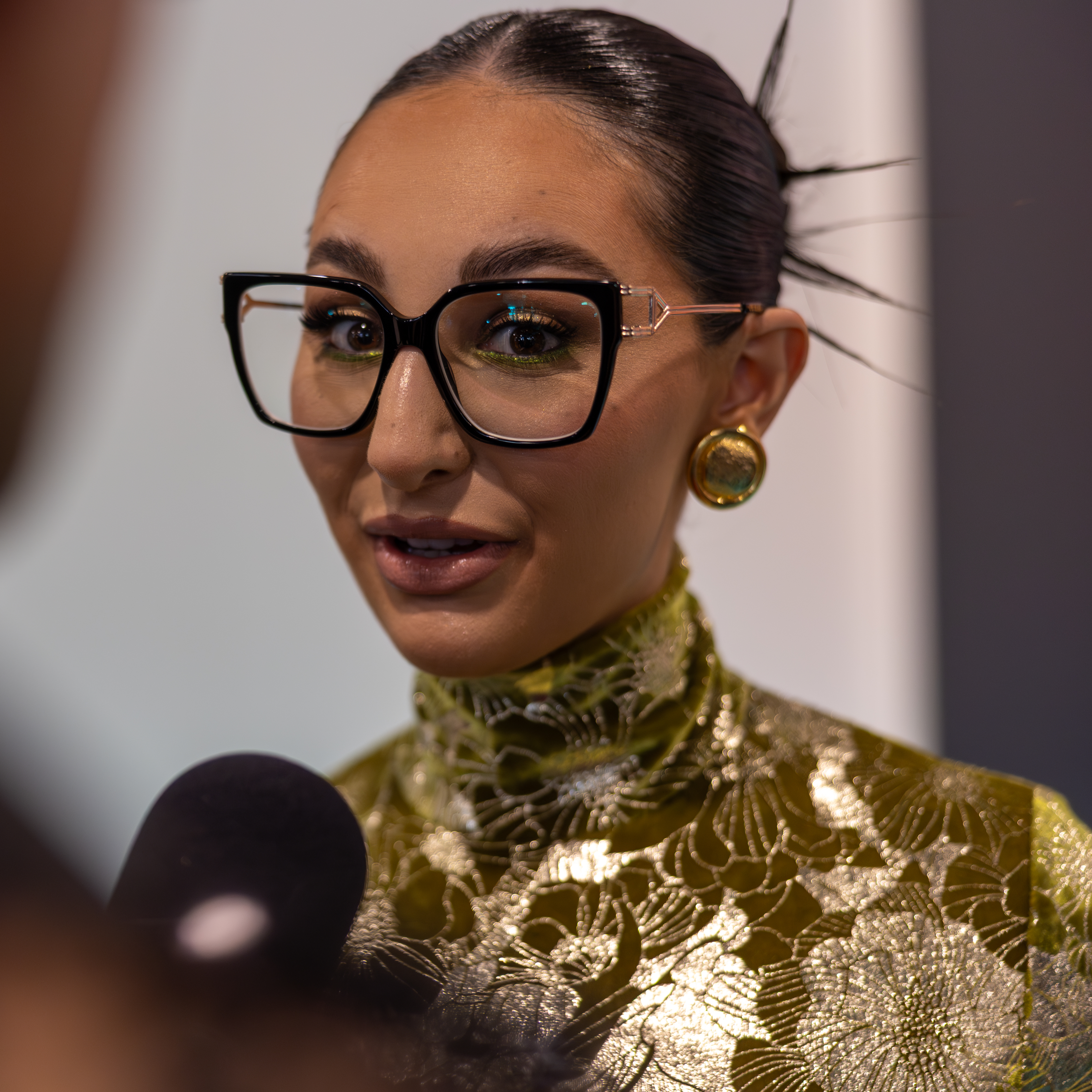
- Klavdia in 2025

Background information
- Born: Klavdia Papadopoulou; 18 August 2002 (age 24); Aspropyrgos, Greece
- Genres: Indie pop
- Occupations: Singer; songwriter
- Instrument: Vocals
- Years active: 2020–present
- Labels: Arcade Music; Panik Records

Klavdia Papadopoulou (Greek: Κλαυδία Παπαδοπούλου; (Note: Greek pronunciation: [klavˈði.a papaðoˈpulu]) born 18 August 2002), also known mononymously as Klavdia, is a Greek singer and songwriter. She represented Greece in the Eurovision Song Contest 2025 with the song "Asteromata", finishing in sixth place overall with 231 points.

== Early life ==
Papadopoulou was born on 18 August 2002 in Aspropyrgos, outside of Athens. She is of Pontic descent.

== Musical career ==
Papadopoulou rose to prominence in 2017, at the age of 15, when she auditioned for the fifth season of Greece's Got Talent performing Michael Jackson's song "Billie Jean". In 2018, she took part in the fifth season of The Voice of Greece on Skai TV. During the auditions, she performed the song "Roxanne" by the Police, winning the approval of all four judges, and becoming part of Helena Paparizou's team. She continued her journey until the final stage of the program, but failed to qualify for the final three.

Shortly after her experience on the talent show, Papadopoulou signed a record deal with the Greek label Arcade Music and Panik Records, with which she released her first singles written by Arcade, including "Haramanta", certified double platinum by IFPI Greece for 40,000 units, and "Vasanizomai". In late 2022, she applied to represent Greece at the Eurovision Song Contest 2023. Despite being selected among the finalists, Greece's public broadcaster ended up choosing Victor Vernicos as the national representative in Liverpool. In 2024, she released her self-titled debut EP Klavdia.

On 10 January 2025, Greek broadcaster ERT announced Papadopoulou as one of the participants in Ethnikos Telikos, the new selection to decide Greece's representative at the Eurovision Song Contest 2025, with the song "Asteromata". The national selection, which took place on 30 January at the Christmas Theatre in Galatsi, saw Papadopoulou perform as the fifth contestant out of twelve. Thanks to her performance, she won first place in the overall vote of the international juries and televoting, thus triumphing in the singing competition and earning the honor of representing Greece on the Eurovision stage in Basel, where she finished 6th at the final with 231 points. The following year, she returned as Greece's spokesperson, giving the 12 points to Cyprus's Antigoni and her song "Jalla".

== Personal life ==
From 2024 to 2025, Klavdia had been in a relationship with Greek rapper and music producer OGE.

== Discography ==
=== Studio albums ===
List of studio albums, with selected details
Title	Details
Asteromata	Release date: 19 May 2025; Label: Arcade Music / Panik Records; Formats: Digital download, streaming

=== Extended plays ===
List of EPs, with selected details
Title	Details
Klavdia	Released: 16 February 2024; Label: Arcade Music / Panik Records; Formats: Digital download, streaming

=== Singles ===
==== As lead artist ====
Title	Year	Peak chart positions			Certifications	Album or EP
Title	Year	GRE Local	LTU	SWE Heat.	Certifications	Album or EP
"Lonely Heart"	2022	—	—	—		Asteromata
"Edo gyrnao"	2022	—	—	—		Non-album single
"Haramata"	2023	37	—	—	IFPI GRE: 4× Platinum	Klavdia
"Holy Water"	2023	—	—	—		Non-album single
"Vasanizomai"	2024	—	—	—		Klavdia
"Movin' Too Fast" (with Playmen)	2024	—	—	—		Non-album single
"Nyxta mou megali" (with Oge and Arcade)	2024	46	—	—	IFPI GRE: Platinum	Asteromata
"Asteromata"	2025	2	52	12	IFPI GRE: 2× Platinum	Asteromata
"Back to Blue" (with Edward Maya and Valentino Indy)	2025	—	—	—		Non-album singles
"Anemos"	2025	—	—	—		Non-album singles
"Catharticus" (Greek Version) (with Jerry Heil)	2026	—	—	—		Non-album singles
"Oneiro vathi" (with Arcade)	2026	—	—	—		Non-album singles
"Say My Name (The Riddle)" (with Tr3nacria)	2026	—	—	—		Non-album singles
"—" denotes a recording that did not chart or was not released in that territory.

==== As featured artist ====
Title	Year	Album or EP
"Se alli agkalia (Menak wla meni)" (Natasha Kay featuring Klavdia)	2021	Non-album singles
"Fire in the Sky" (Valeron featuring Klavdia)	2023	Non-album singles
"Touch Me" (Playmen and Valeron featuring Klavdia)	2024	Non-album singles

=== Other charted songs ===
Title	Year	Peak chart positions	Album or EP
Title	Year	GRE Local	Album or EP
"Sintrimmia" (with Oge and Sin Laurent featuring Arcade and Beyond)	2025	94	Asteromata

== Awards and nominations ==
Year	Award	Category	Nominee(s)	Result	Ref.
2025	Eurovision Awards	Artistic Vision	Herself	Nominated	

== Notes ==
Awards and achievements
Preceded by Marina Satti with "Zari"	Greece in the Eurovision Song Contest; 2025	Succeeded by Akylas with "Ferto"
