= One (band) =

Greek Cypriot boy band

- Origin: Greece / Cyprus
- Genres: Pop
- Years active: 1999–2005; 2015; 2019–present
- Label: Minos EMI
- Members: Constantinos Christophorou, Philippos-Constantinos Philippou, Demetres Koutsavlakis, Argyris Nastopoulos, Panos Tserpes,
- Past members: Demos Beke

ONE is a boy band that first appeared in 1999, recognized as both Greece and Cyprus's first boy band. The band was formed by leading Cypriot-Greek composer Giorgos Theofanous and Minos EMI A&R Manager Vangelis Yannopoulos. Constantinos Christophorou and Philippos-Constantinos Philippou were on board quite early, chosen by Giorgos Theofanous. The next three members were picked up after a selective audition that took place in legendary Athenian Sierra Studio. The selecting committee consisted of Natalia Germanou, Posidonas Yannopoulos, Andreas Kouris, Themis Georgandas, Theofanous and Yannopoulos. Demetres Koutsavlakis, Argyris Nastopoulos and Panos Tserpes were retained among 179 candidates. Christoforou followed a solo career in 2003, and was replaced by another Cypriot singer, Demos Beke. In their 6-year existence they enjoyed much commercial success and earned platinum certifications, as well as having staged memorable performances with successful Greek singers at music halls and in concerts. In 2005 the band formally disbanded and reunited in 2019.

In July 1999 they released their first single, with their debut album following in October. All music and lyrics were written by Giorgos Theofanous (as was all the rest of the musical recorded material of the band) while Vangelis Yannopoulos was producing.

== Eurovision 2002 ==
At the end of 2001, national Cypriot broadcaster CyBC requested that they participate in the Eurovision Song Contest 2002. They agreed and Theofanous wrote the song "Gimme" especially for the occasion. Backup vocals were performed by Christina Argyri who was part of the stage duo Voice who represented Cyprus in 2000. After finishing in 6th place they became famous in both Cyprus and Greece and landed platinum certifications.

This was Christoforou's second Eurovision performance as already having represented Cyprus in 1996 with the song "Mono Yia Mas".

Christoforou went on to once again represent Cyprus as a solo artist in the Eurovision Song Contest 2005 with the song "Ela Ela (Come Baby)".

== Reunion and new music ==
In 2015 the group reunited to perform their hit "Gimme" as guests at the Greek national final Eurosong 2015, held to select the Greek entry for the Eurovision Song Contest 2015.

On 13 February 2020, record label Minos EMI, formally announced a new single for the group, called "Billy Bam Bam" which was released on 24 February 2020.

== Discography ==
Through their 5 years ONE had released 5 studio albums, 1 live album, 4 maxi singles, and many singles. Their sales exceed 700 000 copies.

=== Studio albums ===
- 1999: ONE

Their debut album released by Minos EMI included hits like "Proti Mou Fora", "Stin Agakalia Sou" and others. Reached Platinum status in Greece (50 000 copies) and Platinum status in Cyprus (8 000 copies)

- 2001: MORO MOU (My Baby)

Their follow-up album released by Minos EMI followed the success of album One selling more than 50 000 copies in Greece and more than 6 000 copies in Cyprus becoming Platinum in both countries.

- 2002: EHO TOSA NA SOU PO (I Have So Much To Tell You)

The album was originally released in May 2002, featuring the number 1 single Gimme (Cyprus Entry - Eurovision Song Contest 2002). There was a second special edition of Eho Tosa Na Sou + The One and Only. It was re-released in December 2002 with a bonus CD featuring the new song "The One And Only" a cover version of Wham! classic hit Last Christmas and some of their greatest hits in English. The album was once again a Platinum sales record in Cyprus and Greece.

- 2003: ONEira (Dreams)

The first studio album with new member Demos Beke. Included were the hits "Krata me", "Kainouria Arhi", "Power" and "Oneira".

- 2004: META APO CHRONIA (2004) (After Some Years)

The 5th album by ONE was an album of covers of some of the most popular Greek songs of the 1980s and 1990s. Included were the hits "Kanenas den mas stamata" (Starship's "Nothing's gonna stop us now) and "Akou tin kardia" (Roxette's "Listen to your heart"). Soon after the group was split.

=== Live albums ===
2003: BEST OF ONE - LIVE STO LIKAVITO (Best Of One - Live At the Likavitos Theatre) The album was recorded during the band's 2002 concert at Likavitos theatre in Athens. The album charted top 5 on both Greece and Cyprus.

=== EPs/Maxi Singles ===
- 1999: ONE (1999)

The band's first ever release was the EP ONE. It was an immediate success reaching Platinum status in Cyprus and Gold in Greece giving the band the chance to release their first studio album.

- 2000: 200ONE

The EP 200ONE (Two Thousand ONE) was released on Christmas 2000 including 3 songs. The EP reached Platinum in Cyprus and Gold in Greece.

- 2002: GIMME

The maxi single "Gimme" featured the Cypriot entry to the Eurovision Song Contest 2002. It became Platinum in both Greece (was their best selling single in Greece) and Cyprus.

- 2002: DAME

Dame was the song Gimme in Spanish. The maxi-single was released in Summer 2002 in Spain.

- 2003: KAINOURIA ARHI (New Beginning)

This EP was their first record to come out presenting the replacement of Constantinos Christoforou, Demos Van Beke. The EP reached Gold status in Greece and Platinum in Cyprus.

- 2020: BILLY BAM BAM

This is the group's first single in 15 years since they disbanded in 2005, the single released on 24 February 2020 and reached #1 in Cyprus airplay charts and top 20 in Greece

- 2020: Diskola Ta Pramata

Preceded by Voice with Nomiza	Cyprus in the Eurovision Song Contest; 2002	Succeeded by Stelios Constantas with Feeling Alive
