= Constantinos Christoforou =

Greek Cypriot singer (born 1977)

Constantinos Christophorou Κωνσταντίνος Χριστοφόρου
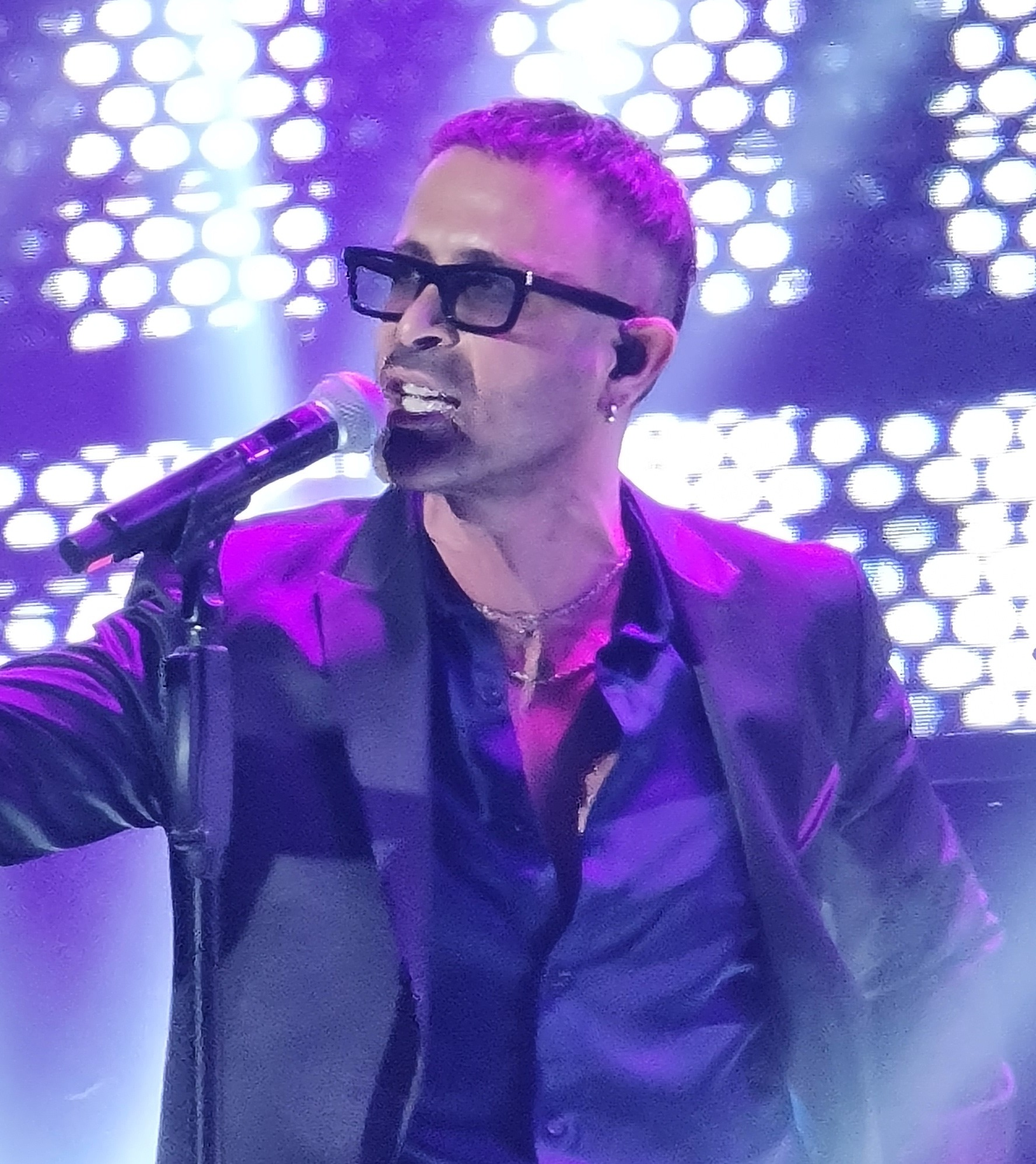
- Christoforou performing in October 2024

Background information
- Born: 25 April 1977 (age 49); Limassol, Cyprus
- Genres: Pop, ethnic, rock, dance
- Occupations: Singer; songwriter
- Instruments: Vocals, piano, guitar
- Years active: 1994–present
- Labels: Minos EMI, Universal

Constantinos Christophorou (Greek: Κωνσταντίνος Χριστοφόρου, born 25 April 1977) is a Greek Cypriot singer. He represented Cyprus in Eurovision Song Contest as a solo singer with "Mono Yia Mas" (1996) and "Ela Ela (Come Baby)" (2005) and as part of the boy band formation One with "Gimme" (2002).

== Career ==
Constantinos Christoforou was still a student when his first single, "Tora pou milas" was released in 1994. His first album, O, ti m'afora was released in 1996. The album went three times platinum, making Christoforou the first Cypriot artist ever to receive three times platinum album for an album produced entirely in Cyprus. The same year Christoforou accompanied Greek Cypriot singer Anna Vissi in Cyprus, as well as in her winter performances with Greek singer Sakis Rouvas in Athens. He was the permanent support act for Vissi in all her Greek and international concerts until 1999.

In 1999, Giorgos Theophanous asked Christoforou to become the lead singer of the pop group One, which he did. The boy-band had number one hits in Greece and Cyprus and released three albums which went Platinum in both Greece and Cyprus.

In 2003 Constantinos decided to leave the band and re-commence his solo career. His first solo album after ONE was released in September 2003, titled I agapi sou paei (Love Suits You), including the song "Pote min les pote", a duet with Anna Vissi. The album was certified Platinum in Cyprus.

In 2004 his next album, Idiotiki Parastasi, was released and entered the top 5 in the Greek charts. In March 2005 the album was re-released including the song "Ela, Ela (Come Baby)" which was the Cyprus entry in the Eurovision Song Contest 2005.

His 2005 album O Gyros tou Kosmou, was released in September.

In spring 2006, Christoforou released his CD single "Thes na kanoume sxesi" which was his first Gold certification as a solo artist in Greece. A greatest hits album was released in September, and Constantinos left EMI starting a new collaboration with Virus Records, the first album of which was his solo album I alithia ine mia!, which was released in February 2007. In summer 2007, at the Cyprus Music Awards, Christoforou was awarded song of the year, "Stasou ena lepto". A few days later, Christoforou was the opening act for Bryan Adams for his grand concert in Cyprus with the song "She's no fool".

In June 2008, Christoforou released an E.P. titled Istoria 2008 (History 2008) which covers three famous Greek songs including the EPs first single, "Afto to vrady tha’ne diko mas" a duet with the Cypriot singer Constantina who originally sung it.

In 2009, after returning to EMI Music, Christoforou released his next solo album, called Allios.

Since 2010, Constantinos released a series of digital singles like "Yia ola ikanos", "Oxigono" (featuring Eleni Dimou), "Rekor", "Na Rotao Ta Kimmata", "Kokkino", "Aneveno" and more. His latest digital single "Ke Vazo Ena Pario" (featuring Giannis Parios) became a hit in both Cyprus and Greece in the summer of 2016.

In 2011, Christoforou performed live at Arhitektoniki with Eleni Dimou. From September 2011 to January 2012, Christoforou took part in the TV show Dancing on Ice, aired by Antenna TV in Greece. In 2013 and 2014 he performed in the show Ola eginan tragoudia with Despina Olympiou. Since 2015 he is a judge on MEGA Channel Cyprus kid's talent show "DanSing Junior".

Many artists recorded songs written by Christoforou: Anna Vissi with the hit "Erimi Poli" in 2003 from her double platinum album Paraksenes Eikones, Giannis Parios with Agapi Mou in 2003, Stamatis Gonidis in his CD with Antio, Giannis Savvidakis with "Ti na sou po", Andreas Ektoras with "Ksimeromata", Stella Georgiadou with "Pes to" and "Akoma mia mera xorista" (lyrics by Zinonas Zintilis), and Eirini Merkouri with "Den exoume tipota pia na poume". He wrote two songs for Katerina Stasini with whom he had worked in the past. One of the songs was “Tou kosmou ta mikrofona”.

== Eurovision Song Contest ==
In 1996 he represented Cyprus in the Eurovision Song Contest 1996 with the song "Mono Yia Mas", placing 9th.

In 2002, he was alongside Demetres Koutsavlakis, Philippos-Constantinos Philippou, Argyris Nastopoulos and Panos Tserpes, as part of the musical formation One representing Cyprus in the Eurovision Song Contest 2002 with the song "Gimme" getting the 6th position.

Christophorou competed as a solo artists in the Eurovision Song Contest 2005 with the song "Ela Ela (Come Baby)" finishing in 18th place with a score of 46 points.

At Eurovision Song Contest 2006, he announced the Cypriot televotes. While awarding 12 points to Greece and Anna Vissi's "Everything", Christophorou sang an extract from Vissi's signature song "Dodeka" (Greek for "twelve") from 1995.

In 2010 he participated in the Cypriot national final for the Eurovision Song Contest, with the song "Angel". He placed second nearly missing the opportunity to represent the country in the Eurovision Song Contest 2010 for the fourth time. He also competed in the Greek national selection for the Eurovision Song Contest 2025 alongside Kostas Karafotis with the song "Paradeisos", placing eighth.

At Eurovision Song Contest 2016 and 2017, he announced the Greek jury votes.

== Discography ==
=== Albums ===
- 1996 O,TI M' AFORA (released in Cyprus only) 3× Platinum
- 2003 I AGAPI SOU PAI – (released in Greece and Cyprus) Cyprus: Platinum
- 2004 IDIOTIKI PARASTASI – (released in Greece and Cyprus) Cyprus: Gold
- 2005 O GIROS TOU KOSMOU – (released in Greece and Cyprus)
- 2006 BEST OF
- 2007 I ALITHIA INE MIA – (released in Greece and Cyprus)
- 2009 ALLIOS – (released in Greece and Cyprus)

=== Maxi-singles/EPs ===
- 1995 TORA POU MILAS (released in Cyprus) Platinum
- 1996 MONO YIA MAS (released in Cyprus) Gold
- 1998 2000 KERIA (released in Cyprus) Platinum
- 2003 @LIVE (released in Cyprus)
- 2005 ELA-ELA (released in Greece and Cyprus)
- 2006 THES NA KANUME SHESI (released in Greece and Cyprus) Cyprus: Gold, Greece: Gold
- 2008 ISTORIA 2008 (released in Greece and Cyprus)

=== With One ===
- 1999 ONE (EP)
- 1999 ONE (album) Greece: Platinum, Cyprus: Platinum
- 2000 2000ONE (EP)
- 2001 MORO MOU (album) Greece: Platinum, Cyprus: Platinum
- 2002 GIMME (single) Greece: Gold, Cyprus: Platinum
- 2002 DAME (single – released in Spain only)
- 2002 EHO TOSA NA SOU PO & EHO TOSA NA SOU PO+THE ONE AND ONLY (album) Greece: Platinum, Cyprus: Platinum
- 2003 BEST OF ONE LIVE STO LIKAVITO (live album)
- 2020 Billy Bam Bam (Single)
- 2020 Diskola Ta Pramata (Single)

Preceded by Alex Panayi with "Sti Fotia"	Cyprus in the Eurovision Song Contest; 1996	Succeeded by Chara & Andreas Constantinou with "Mana Mou"
Preceded by Voice with "Nomiza"	Cyprus in the Eurovision Song Contest (as One); 2002	Succeeded by Stelios Constantas with "Feeling Alive"
Preceded by Lisa Andreas with "Stronger Every Minute"	Cyprus in the Eurovision Song Contest; 2005	Succeeded by Annet Artani with "Why Angels Cry"
