= Zari (song) =

2024 song by Marina Satti

Single by Marina Satti

from the album P.O.P.
- English title: Dice
- Released: 7 March 2024
- Length: 3:00
- Label: Golden
- Songwriters: Gino "the Ghost" Borri; Jay Lewitt Stolar; Jordan Richard Palmer; Konstantin Plamenov Beshkov; Manolis "Solmeister" Solidakis; Marina Satti; Nick Kodonas; Oge; Vlospa
- Producers: Ermis Geragidis; Konstantin Plamenov Beshkov; Marina Satti; Michael Stathakis; Nick Kodonas; Oge; Pablo "Mediopicky" Alcántara; Sam Tiba

Marina Satti singles chronology
| "Tucutum" (2023) | "Zari" (2024) | "Lalalala" (2024) |

Music video
- "Zari" on YouTube

Eurovision Song Contest 2024 entry
- Country: Greece
- Artist: Marina Satti
- Languages: Greek
- Composers: Gino "the Ghost" Borri; Jay Lewitt Stolar; Jordan Richard Palmer; Konstantin Plamenov Beshkov; Marina Satti; Nick Kodonas; Oge
- Lyricists: Vlospa; Oge; Marina Satti; Manolis "Solmeister" Solidakis

Finals performance
- Semi-final result: 5th
- Semi-final points: 86
- Final result: 11th
- Final points: 126

Entry chronology
- ◄ "What They Say" (2023)
- "Asteromata" (2025) ►

Official performance video
- "Zari" (Second Semi-Final) on YouTube "Zari" (Grand Final) on YouTube

"Zari" (Greek: Ζάρι, pronounced [ˈzari]; transl. "Dice") is a song by Greek singer Marina Satti as the second single off her extended play P.O.P. (2024). The song was co-written and co-produced by Satti alongside eight other songwriters and seven other producers. It was released on 7 March 2024 by Golden Records. The song represented Greece at the Eurovision Song Contest 2024, where it placed 11th at the grand final with 126 points. A select amount of snippets were picked and remixed from approximately 200 submissions to create the song.

The song has been described by Satti as a song that aims to break stereotypes of young Greek people and their culture. The song received a heavily divided response in Greece and the international community, with praise being awarded towards the song for mixing multiple styles of music. However, it was also met with heavy criticism, with the song being viewed as confusing. Criticism was also levied on the song's stance regarding the reliance of tourism relating to the Greek economy. "Zari" drew commercial success, topping the charts in its native Greece. Internationally, it peaked within the top twenty in Lithuania. It was additionally certified diamond by IFPI Greece.

== Background and composition ==
"Zari" was written by Gino Borri, Jay Lewitt Stolar, Jordan Richard Palmer, Konstantin Plamenov Beshkov, Manolis Solidakis, Marina Satti, Nick Kodonas, Oge, and Vlospa, and produced by Ermis Geragidis, Beshkov, Satti, Michael Stathakis, Kadonas, Oge, Pablo Alcántara, and Sam Tiba. (Note: This acts as a summary of all versions of the song released for digital download. (Note: Citations regarding the digital download release of "Zari" in various countries: "Zari - Song by Marina Satti". Apple Music (DE).; "Zari - Song by Marina Satti on Apple Music". Apple Music (GB).; "Zari - Song by Marina Satti". Apple Music (US). 7 March 2024.; "Zari - Song by Marina Satti on Apple Music". Apple Music (TR).)) The song was created by selecting a few snippets from around 200 submissions and remixing them to create "Zari". It features traditional Greek music, instruments and a "thrumming urban" beat. In the past, Satti had been asked by Greek broadcaster for the Eurovision Song Contest, the Hellenic Broadcasting Corporation (ERT), three times; however, she rejected all calls until 2024 because she "felt readier now".

In press statements given out by Satti, she expressed desires of wanting to mix old and new cultures and traditions of Greece. She also has stated that the song focuses on the theme of luck. In statements given to Greek media, she expressed a desire to break stereotypes about Greek culture with the song. The song was released on 7 March 2024 by Golden Records. Musically, Wiwibloggs' Georgia Efthymiadou wrote that the song was about the "sense of uncertainty and a willingness to embrace whatever comes next, even if it brings pain or difficulty", with the refrain representing how one's life is out of control in the hands of fate.

== Music video ==
Along with the song's release, an accompanying music video was released on the same day. It was filmed in various landmarks around Greece, including the Acropolis, Plaka, Monastiraki, the Odeon of Herodes Atticus, Omonoia, Mount Lycabettus, Rafina and the Athens International Airport. The music video features Satti along with Scott "the American", a longtime American fan of Satti who had previously appeared in several tourism advertisements for Greece. In the video, Scott acts as an Australian tourist, while Satti represents a Greek tour guide.

In an analysis by Nicholas Zois of Kathimerini, Zois wrote that the music video poked fun at the reliance of tourism for the country of Greece "without denying it or clearly condemning it", with the tourist presented representing how tourists want "clichés of an outdated national image" when they visit Greece. Despite this, Satti stated that she wanted to show the true culture of Greece that she grew up and loved, expressing that "my dream is to show the new Greece of today... [especially] the urban culture [because] we all grew up in the city". In another analysis by Matt Wrather of Overthinking It, he viewed Satti as a tour guide working to gain the approval of tourists by showing them a stereotypical and touristy view of Greek culture by degrading the local people. Nevertheless, the tourist in the end gets shown "the real Greece" when Satti drifts him around in a car, with the tourist enjoying the experience.

== Critical reception ==
=== Greek media and personalities ===
Proto Thema's Michalis Stoukas wrote a negative review on "Zari", commentating that the eight songwriters "worked together to write a song that few understood to which musical genre it belongs... we didn't send a song based on traditional rhythms", criticising the song for a lack of identity. In a commentary by four Kathimerini editors, the song was met with mixed reception. Multiple editors wrote in their reviews that they thought the song was too confusing, with the song's modernistic composition being compared to the discography of Rosalía. Another Kathimerini writer, Dimitris Rigopoulos, wrote that the common reaction amongst the international community was that "Greece finally sent a 'Greek in the soul' song... [it has] won them over, something that they" missed in terms of elements that was not present in past recent Greek Eurovision songs. Matt Wrather stated that "the way [Greece] was depicted in the music video", particularly its stance on the reliance of tourism regarding the Greek economy, made many Greeks within the country angry, viewing the song as a sign of disrespect towards Greece.

=== Eurovision-related and other media ===
In a Wiwibloggs review containing reviews from several critics, the song was rated 7.27 out of 10 points, earning 11th out of 37 songs on the site's annual ranking. Another review conducted by ESC Bubble that contained reviews from a combination of readers and juries rated the song tenth out of the 16 songs "Zari" was competing against in its the Eurovision semi-final. ESC Beat's Doron Lahav ranked the song 18th overall, writing that the song was "one of the most modern songs this year", but also acknowledging that "I found the whole package a bit messy and hard to digest in some cases". ESC Insight's Ewan Spence stated that he thought the song was a "girl bop".

Vulture's Jon O'Brien ranked the song 23rd overall in Eurovision 2024, describing it as a disorganized song that "lurch[ed] from snake-charming flutes and reggaeton beats to video-game synths and operatic Middle Eastern melodies without any particular focus". On the other hand, Erin Adam of The Scotsman gave it an 8 out of 10, calling it "unique" and pointing out that "there's nothing else remotely like this in [that year's] contest". The Independent's Roisin O'Connor included the song in her ten favourites to win the contest, writing that while it "might sound strange to some listeners", it was a "very contemporary pop jam that could easily make its way onto our summer playlists".

== Eurovision Song Contest ==
=== Internal selection ===
Greece's broadcaster for the Eurovision Song Contest, the Hellenic Broadcasting Corporation (ERT), officially announced their intention to participate in the Eurovision Song Contest 2024 on 15 September 2023. A month later on 24 October, ERT announced on television show Studio 4 that they had internally selected Satti to represent the country. The songwriting process started the following day, with the song being reported as "Zari" on 13 February 2024.

=== At Eurovision ===
The Eurovision Song Contest 2024 took place at the Malmö Arena in Malmö, Sweden, and consisted of two semi-finals held on the respective dates of 7 and 9 May and the final on 11 May 2024. During the allocation draw on 30 January 2024, Greece was drawn to compete in the second semi-final, performing in the first half of the show. Satti was later drawn to perform third, ahead of Albania's Besa and before Switzerland's Nemo.

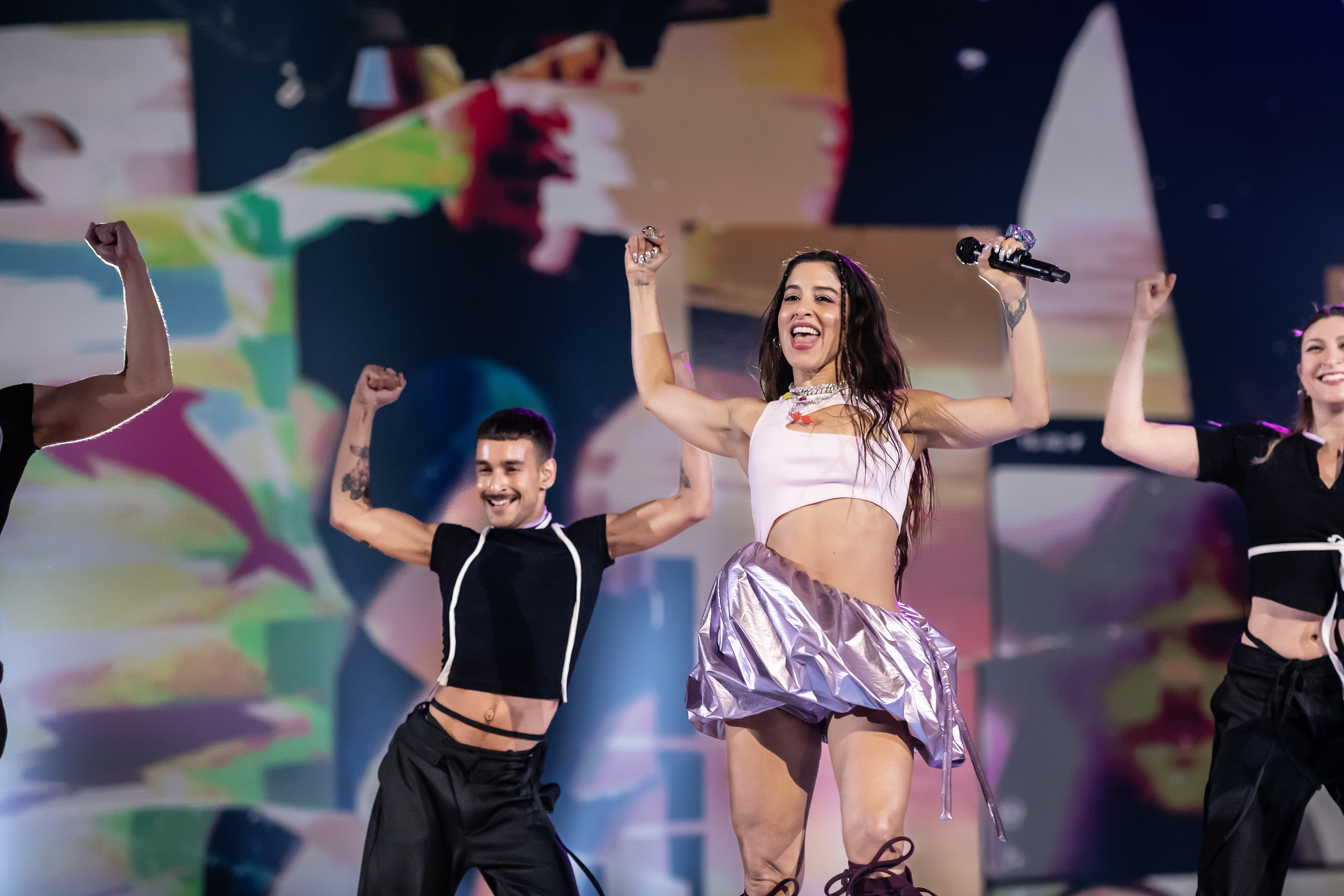
Satti performing "Zari" at a dress rehearsal before the Eurovision 2024 second semi-final.

For its Eurovision performance, Fokas Evangelinos was appointed as the staging director. The performances features Satti along with four backing dancers along with a singular backing vocalist. Satti wears a purple dress and skirt, with the background dancers wearing black clothing. The performance starts in a 9:16 screen ratio, which was interpreted by ESC Insight's Ewan Spence as "if we are watching it live streamed from someone's phone", symbolizing the showcasing of Greek culture from her phone. The majority of the performance was filmed on one camerashot. "Zari" finished in fifth, scoring 86 points and securing a position in the grand final.

Satti performed a repeat of her performance in the grand final on 11 May 2024. The song was performed in 12th, ahead of Latvia's Dons and before the United Kingdom's Olly Alexander. The performance received mixed reactions. Loukas Yorkas, the Greek representative for the Eurovision Song Contest 2011, stated in Proto Thema that "[the Greek delegation] presented this year's song in the best possible way". Greek singer Kostas Bigalis, the Greek representative in 1994, stated that although "[Marina] did whatever she could based on her song", it "never plays an actually important role". He further went on to criticize the contest in general and the musical quality of "Zari", stating that the era for Eurovision being based on the quality of music was in the past. Greek representative for the 1987 contest, Thanos Kalliris, also gave positive remarks on Satti's vocal abilities but admitted that "due to my age, I was one of those who did not like the Greek participation... it was like a jumble of many things".

After the results were announced, Satti finished in 11th with 126 points, with a split score of 41 points from juries and 85 points from public televoting. Regarding the former category, the song received one set of the maximum 12 points from Switzerland. It also received another set of 12 points from the public televote, with it being awarded by Cyprus. In response to her finish, Satti stated satisfaction, proclaiming that "I was glad that in the end the presentation in the final was good". Katy Garbi, representative for Greece in the contest in 1993, proclaimed that "I felt sorry for Greece, I believed in our song and I think we deserved to do better." Months after the contest, the song's Eurovision performance won the best "Onstage Ensemble" award via an online fan vote conducted by the contest.

== Commercial performance ==
"Zari" drew commercial success, particularly in its native country of Greece. The song peaked on the Billboard Greece Songs chart at number one for the week ending March 23, 2024. Additionally, it has also received a diamond certification by IFPI Greece. Internationally, the song has charted in 108th in the Netherlands and 20th in Lithuania. On streaming platform Spotify, "Zari" became the first song ever with Greek lyrics to enter the Global Viral 50 list, entering in at 21st. As of 18 June 2024, the song has 22.9 million streams on Spotify.

== Track listings ==
- Streaming/digital download – original
1. "Zari" – 3:00
- Streaming/digital download – EP (Note: This acts as a summary of all versions of the song released for digital download. (Note: Citations regarding the digital download release of "Zari (EP)" in various countries: "Zari - Song by Marina Satti". Apple Music (DE).; "Zari - Song by Marina Satti on Apple Music". Apple Music (GB).; "Zari - Song by Marina Satti". Apple Music (US). 7 March 2024.; "Zari - Song by Marina Satti on Apple Music". Apple Music (TR).))
1. "Zari" – 3:00
2. "Zari" (live from Peristeri, Greece / 2024) – 3:14
3. "Zari" (a capella) – 3:00
4. "Zari" (instrumental) – 3:00
5. "Zari" (sped up) – 2:36

== Charts ==
Chart performance for "Zari"
| Chart (2024) | Peak position |
|---|---|
| Greece (Billboard) | 1 |
| Greece Local (IFPI) | 1 |
| Lithuania (AGATA) | 20 |
| Netherlands (Single Tip) | 8 |
| Sweden Heatseeker (Sverigetopplistan) | 10 |
| Switzerland (Schweizer Hitparade) | 99 |

== Certifications ==
Certifications for "Zari"
| Region | Certification | Certified units/sales |
Streaming
| Greece (IFPI Greece) | Diamond | 10,000,000^{†} |
^{†} Streaming-only figures based on certification alone.

== Release history ==
Release history and formats for "Zari"
| Country | Version | Date | Format(s) | Label | Ref. |
|---|---|---|---|---|---|
| Various | Original | 7 March 2024 | Digital download; streaming | Golden Records | |
| Various | EP | 10 May 2024 | Digital download; streaming | Golden Records | |
