= Asteromata =

2025 song by Klavdia

"Asteromáta"

Single by Klavdia

from the album Asteromata
- Language: Greek
- English title: "Starry Eyed Girl"
- Released: 31 January 2025
- Genre: Ballad
- Length: 2:55
- Label: Arcade Music; Panik
- Songwriters: Dimitris "Diveno" Beltsos; Egion "Gioni" Parreniasi; Gabriel Russell; Klavdia Papadopoulou; Loukas Damianakos; Pavlos Manolis
- Producer: Arcade

Klavdia singles chronology
"Nyxta mou megali" (2024)	"Asteromáta" (2025)	"Back to Blue" (2025)

Music videos
- "Asteromáta" on YouTube "Asteromáta" (acoustic version) on YouTube

Eurovision Song Contest 2025 entry
- Country: Greece
- Artist: Klavdia
- Language: Greek
- Composers: Dimitris "Diverno" Beltsos; Egion "Gioni" Parreniasi; Gabriel Russell; Klavdia Papadopoulou; Loukas Damianakos; Pavlos Manolis
- Lyricists: Dimitris "Diverno" Beltsos; Egion "Gioni" Parreniasi; Gabriel Russell; Loukas Damianakos; Pavlos Manolis

Finals performance
- Semi-final result: 4th
- Semi-final points: 112
- Final result: 6th
- Final points: 231

Entry chronology
- ◄ "Zari" (2024)
- "Ferto" (2026) ►

Official performance video
- "Asteromáta" (second semi-final) on YouTube "Asteromáta" (grand final) on YouTube

"Asteromáta" (Greek: Αστερομάτα, pronounced [asteroˈmata]; transl. "Starry-Eyed Girl") is a song by Greek singer Klavdia, written by Arcade and Klavdia with production handled by Arcade. It was released on 31 January 2025 and represented Greece in the Eurovision Song Contest 2025. It peaked at number three in Greece and was certified platinum by IFPI Greece.

== Background and composition ==
"Asteromáta" was written by Arcade alongside Klavdia Papadopoulou.

The song talks about Greek, and other, refugees and that special bond between them and their home land, which they never forget, wherever they are. A metaphorical dialogue is being formed between a mother and her missing child, which comforts her and viceversa.

In an interview, Klavdia, who is of Pontic Greek descent, explained that the message of the song intends to honor those who were forced to abandon their homeland, transmitting a message of hope and resilience.

In another interview, Klavdia noted that the 2023 Tempi train crash, which killed many university students, influenced the song and the theme of losing a child.

== Eurovision Song Contest ==
=== Ethnikós Telikós 2025 ===
Ethnikós Telikós 2025 was organised by the Hellenic Broadcasting Corporation (ERT) to select its entry for that year's Eurovision Song Contest.

On 10 January 2025, during the ERT1 show Proian se eidon, it was announced that Klavdia would compete in the Greek national final for the Eurovision Song Contest 2025, dubbed Ethnikós Telikós 2025, with the song "Asteromáta" (Αστερομάτα). The song won Ethnikós Telikós on 30 January 2025, where it came in first place overall by the national and international jury, as well as the audience votes, thus qualifying the song to represent Greece at the Eurovision Song Contest.

=== At Eurovision ===
The Eurovision Song Contest 2025 took place at St. Jakobshalle in Basel, Switzerland, and consisted of two semi-finals held on the respective dates of 13 and 15 May and the final on 17 May 2025. During the allocation draw held on 28 January 2025, Greece was drawn to compete in the second semi-final, performing in the first half of the show. Greece managed to finish 6th place at the contest.

== Charts ==
Chart performance for "Asteromáta"
Chart (2025)	Peak position
Greece Local (IFPI)	2
Lithuania (AGATA)	52
Sweden Heatseeker (Sverigetopplistan)	12
Switzerland (Schweizer Hitparade)	43
UK Singles Downloads (Official Charts)	91
UK Singles Sales (OCC)	96

== Certifications ==
Certifications for "Asteromáta"
Region	Certification	Certified units/sales
Streaming
Greece (IFPI Greece)	2× Platinum	4,000,000^{†}
^{†} Streaming-only figures based on certification alone.

== Release history ==
Release history and formats for "Asteromáta"
Country	Date	Format(s)	Version	Label	Ref.
Various	10 January 2025	Digital download; streaming	Original	Panik Records	
Various	12 March 2025	Digital download; streaming	Playmen and Valeron remix	Panik Records	
Various	26 December 2025	Digital download; streaming	Tayllor & Joezi remix	Panik Records	
