= Cyprus in the Eurovision Song Contest 2005 =

- Eurovision Song Contest 2005
- Participating broadcaster: Cyprus Broadcasting Corporation (CyBC)
- Country: Cyprus
- Selection process: Artist: Internal selection Song: National final
- Selection date: Artist: 24 November 2004; Song: 1 February 2005

Competing entry
- Song: "Ela Ela (Come Baby)"
- Artist: Constantinos Christoforou
- Songwriters: Constantinos Christoforou

Placement
- Final result: 18th, 46 points

Participation chronology

Cyprus was represented at the Eurovision Song Contest 2005 with the song "Ela Ela (Come Baby)", written and performed by Constantinos Christoforou. The Cypriot participating broadcaster, the Cyprus Broadcasting Corporation (CyBC), selected its entry through a national final, after having previously selected the performer internally in November 2004. The national final, which took place on 1 February 2005, featured four songs performed by Christoforou and resulted in the selection of "Ela Ela (Come Baby)" through a combination of public televote and jury deliberation.

Prior to the contest, a music video of the song was released and Christoforou toured 15 countries to promote the entry, including performing in several national finals of other participating nations. As one of the nine highest placed finishers in the 2004 contest, Cyprus automatically qualified to compete in the final of the Eurovision Song Contest 2005. Performing during the show in position 9, the nation placed 18th out of the 24 participating countries in the final, scoring 46 points.

== Background ==
Prior to the 2005 contest, the Cyprus Broadcasting Corporation (CyBC) had participated in the Eurovision Song Contest representing Cyprus 22 times since its debut in the 1981 contest. Its best placing was fifth, which it achieved three times: in 1982 with the song "Mono i agapi" performed by Anna Vissi and in 1997 with "Mana mou" performed by Hara and Andreas Constantinou, and in 2004 with "Stronger Every Minute" performed by Lisa Andreas. Its least successful result was in 1986 when it placed last with the song "Tora zo" by Elpida, receiving four points in total; its worst finish in terms of points received was when it placed second to last in 1999 with "Tha'nai erotas" by Marlain Angelidou, receiving only two points.

As part of its duties as participating broadcaster, CyBC organises the selection of its entry in the Eurovision Song Contest and broadcasts the event in the country. CyBC's intention to participate in the 2005 contest was revealed on 9 September 2004. The broadcaster had used internal selections and televised national finals to select its entry in the past. In 2003, CyBC selected the entrant internally, while in 2004, it organised a national final to select the entry. In 2004, CyBC opted to internally select the artist and organise a national final to select the song.

== Before Eurovision ==
=== Artist selection ===
In early September 2004, members of the group Hi-5 revealed on the Sigma TV show Alive that CyBC had approached them to represent Cyprus in Kyiv. The next month, CyBC stated that they had terminated negotiations with the group and announced they were instead reviewing a proposal by EMI Greece to send Constantinos Christoforou to the contest; confirmation of his selection came on 24 November 2004. Christoforou had previously represented Cyprus in 1996 as a solo act and in 2002 as part of the group One, where he placed ninth and sixth with the songs "Mono gia mas" and "Gimme", respectively. Alongside word of Christoforou's selection by CyBC, details of the song selection process were also announced, with the song to be selected through a national final.

=== National final ===
Four songs, two written by Christoforou himself and two written by Mike Connaris (who composed the Cypriot Eurovision entry in 2004) were selected for the national final and were announced on 28 January 2005. The national final took place on 1 February 2005 at the Monte Caputo Nightclub in Limassol, was hosted by Tasos Tryfonos and Eleni Manousaki, and was broadcast on RIK 1 and RIK Sat, as well as online via cybc.cy. The satellite broadcast contained an English translation of the show and the event was also live streamed to the UK on London Greek Radio.

All four competing songs were performed by Christoforou and the winning song, "Ela Ela (Come Baby)", was selected by a combination of votes from a public televote (60%) and a seven-member jury panel (40%). "Ela Ela (Come Baby)" received 68% of the public televote. Backing vocals for "Ela Ela (Come Baby)" were provided by Elena Patroklou, who represented Cyprus in 1991. The members of the jury were Ruslana (who won Eurovision for Ukraine in 2004), Evridiki (who represented Cyprus in 1992 and in 1994), Dimitris Korgialas (singer and composer), Dafni Bokota (singer and television presenter), Evi Papamichail (Head of Delegation for Cyprus at Eurovision), Sokratis Soumelas (representing EMI Greece) and Nikos Nikolaou (actor). In addition to the performances of the competing songs, the show featured guest performances by Korgialas, Evridiki, and Ruslana. Christoforou also performed songs from his studio album Idiotiki parastasi.

Final 1 – 1 February 2005
R/O	Song	Songwriter(s)	Place
1	"Slow"	Constantinos Christoforou	2
2	"She's No Fool"	Mike Connaris	3
3	"If You Go"	Mike Connaris	4
4	"Ela Ela (Come Baby)"	Constantinos Christoforou	1

=== Promotion ===
Following the song's selection, Christoforou's prior studio album Idiotiki parastasi, which had been certified gold, was re-released in February 2005 to include "Ela Ela (Come Baby)" as well as three additional bonus tracks; the other national final songs were not included. A music video for "Ela Ela (Come Baby)" was then released on 19 March during the CyBC show Efharisto Savvatovrado to further promote for the entry.

Christoforou also visited and performed in 15 countries that were taking part in the 2005 contest as part of a promotional tour. This included performing at Malta's selection event on 21 February 2005, followed by Greece's on 2 March and Serbia and Montenegro's on 4 March. By late March, Christoforou had also visited Switzerland to record television appearances. Christoforou returned to Malta on 12 April for two days of additional interviews with media, including the exclusive premiere of the club mix of "Ela Ela (Come Baby)" on the Eurovision Radio segment of Maltese station Super One Radio. Other promotional activities included Christoforou performing at club Eros in London on 2 May alongside previous year's Cypriot entrant Lisa Andreas and the United Kingdom's 2005 entrant Javine. While in London, he also appeared on the ITV News show Live with Angela Rippon alongside entrants from Lithuania and Malta, and was interviewed by London Greek Radio and London Hellenic TV. A visit to Portugal followed the UK, before Christoforou returned to Greece on 10 May. He also visited Belarus, Russia, Romania, Andorra, Spain, Croatia, and Slovenia.

== At Eurovision ==
The Eurovision Song Contest 2005 took place at the Palace of Sports in Kyiv, Ukraine, and consisted of the semi-final on 19 May and the final on 21 May 2005. All participating nations, with the exceptions of the host country, the "Big Four" (France, Germany, Spain, and the United Kingdom), and the nine highest placed finishers in the 2004 contest, were required to qualify from the semi-final on 19 May 2005 in order to compete for the final on 21 May 2005; the top ten countries from the semi-final then progressed to the final. As Cyprus finished fifth in the 2004 contest, the nation automatically qualified to compete in the final. Both the semi-final and the final were broadcast in Cyprus on RIK 1 and RIK SAT with commentary by Evi Papamichail.

On 22 March 2005, an allocation draw was held which determined the running order for the semi-final and final, and Cyprus was set to perform in position 9 in the final, following the entry from Albania and before the entry from Spain. Christoforou and his team took part in rehearsals on 16 and 17 May, followed by dress rehearsals on 20 and 21 May. The Cypriot stage performance was choreographed by Fotis Nikolaou, who was part of the artistic team for the opening and closing ceremonies of the 2004 Summer Olympics in Athens. Christoforou was joined on stage by four dancers, as well as by backing vocalist Elina Konstantopoulou, who represented Greece in 1995; she replaced Patroklou, who decided not to perform at the contest for personal reasons. The performance was opened by Konstantopoulou singing before Christoforou took over for the main part of the song; the stage presence utilized divider mirrors as well as large drums. At the end of the final, Cyprus placed 18th, scoring 46 points.

=== Voting ===
Voting during the three shows involved each country awarding 1–8, 10 and 12 points to the other competing countries; countries were not allowed to register votes for themselves. All countries participating in the contest were required to use televoting and/or SMS voting during both rounds of the contest. At the end of the event, Cyprus received the top 12 points from Greece and Malta, garnering 46 points overall and placing 18th in the field of 24 finalists. The nation awarded its top 12 points from televoting to Romania in the semi-final and to Greece in the final. CyBC appointed Melani Steliou as its spokesperson to announce the Cypriot votes during the final.

==== Points awarded to Cyprus ====
Points awarded to Cyprus (Final)
Score	Country
12 points	Malta; Greece
10 points	Bulgaria
8 points	
7 points	Albania
6 points	
5 points	
4 points	
3 points	United Kingdom
2 points	
1 point	Romania; Serbia and Montenegro

==== Points awarded by Cyprus ====
Points awarded by Cyprus (Semi-final)
Score	Country
12 points	Romania
10 points	Bulgaria
8 points	Moldova
7 points	Belarus
6 points	Hungary
5 points	Switzerland
4 points	Norway
3 points	Israel
2 points	Latvia
1 point	Ireland

Points awarded by Cyprus (Final)
Score	Country
12 points	Greece
10 points	Serbia and Montenegro
8 points	Romania
7 points	Hungary
6 points	Malta
5 points	United Kingdom
4 points	Switzerland
3 points	Norway
2 points	Moldova
1 point	Latvia
