= Efi Thodi =

Greek pop singer (born 1964)

Efi Thodi Έφη Θώδη
- Born: 18 January 1964 (age 62)
- Origin: Vrangiana, Karditsa, Greece
- Genres: Pop
- Occupation: Singer
- Years active: 1983–present

Efi Thodi (Greek: Έφη Θώδη; 18 January 1964) is a Greek pop singer who specializes in traditional Greek and pop music. She was born and raised in Vrangiana, Karditsa. Her music career began in 1984. Her first songs were in Greek and had a traditional style that she used until 2006.

In March 2009, Thodi made television appearances claiming that she discovered a special spiritual power inside her that enables her to help and heal people. She also claimed that she had seen divine visions. This led Thodi to a mental illness clinic of Sismanogleion hospital, to the dismay of her family.

== Discography ==
=== Studio albums ===
Album	Year	Labels
Σώπα - Σώπα Μη Μιλάς	1984	Phoenix
Σ'αγαπώ Και Σε Λατρεύω	1987	Phoenix
Στο Ρυθμό Της Έφης	1988	Phoenix
Γλυκά Γλυκά Γλυκειά Μου	1989	Phoenix
Τα Ερωτικά Μου	1991	Phoenix
Αγγελάκι/Αμογδαλιά	1992	Phoenix
Πρέπει Να Συναντηθούμε	2000	General Music
Χριστουγεννιάτικα Κάλαντα	2005	Alpha Records
I Love You Baby	2006	Alpha Records
Οι 300	2007	Alpha Records
International	2008	Alpha Records
Κλαρίνο Και Άγιος Ο Θεός	2014	General Music
Μ'Αγαπάς Δε Μ'Αγαπάς	2015	General Music
Νάνι – Νάνι	2017	General Music

=== Live albums ===
Year	Title
1986	Μεγάλες Επιτυχίες / Ζωντανή Ηχογράφηση
2005	Live — Χορευτικά Κι Αγαπημένα
2007	Το Μεγάλο Πανηγύρι
2009	Ελληνικό Γλέντι (Live)
2015	Έφη Θώδη/Live Μεγάλες Επιτυχίες

=== CD singles ===
Year	Title
2008	Στην Γιουροβίζιον Θα Πάω
2009	Facebook
2010	Botox
2013	Σουλεϊμάν
2019	Μαζί
2019	Τα Γαλανά Σου Μάτια
2021	Θα Πάρω Τα Βουνά
2021	Κου Πεπε
2021	Εξάρτηση
2022	Σαν Πήγα Στην Καρδίτσα
2025	Το Γλέντι
2025	Τρακτέρ

=== Collaborations ===
Year	Song title
2017	"Viral" (with Antonis Gabierakis)
2015	"Όπως Λάχει Εμείς Οι Βλάχοι" (with Tus)
