= Lefteris Pantazis =

Greek singer (born 1955)

- Λευτέρης Πανταζής
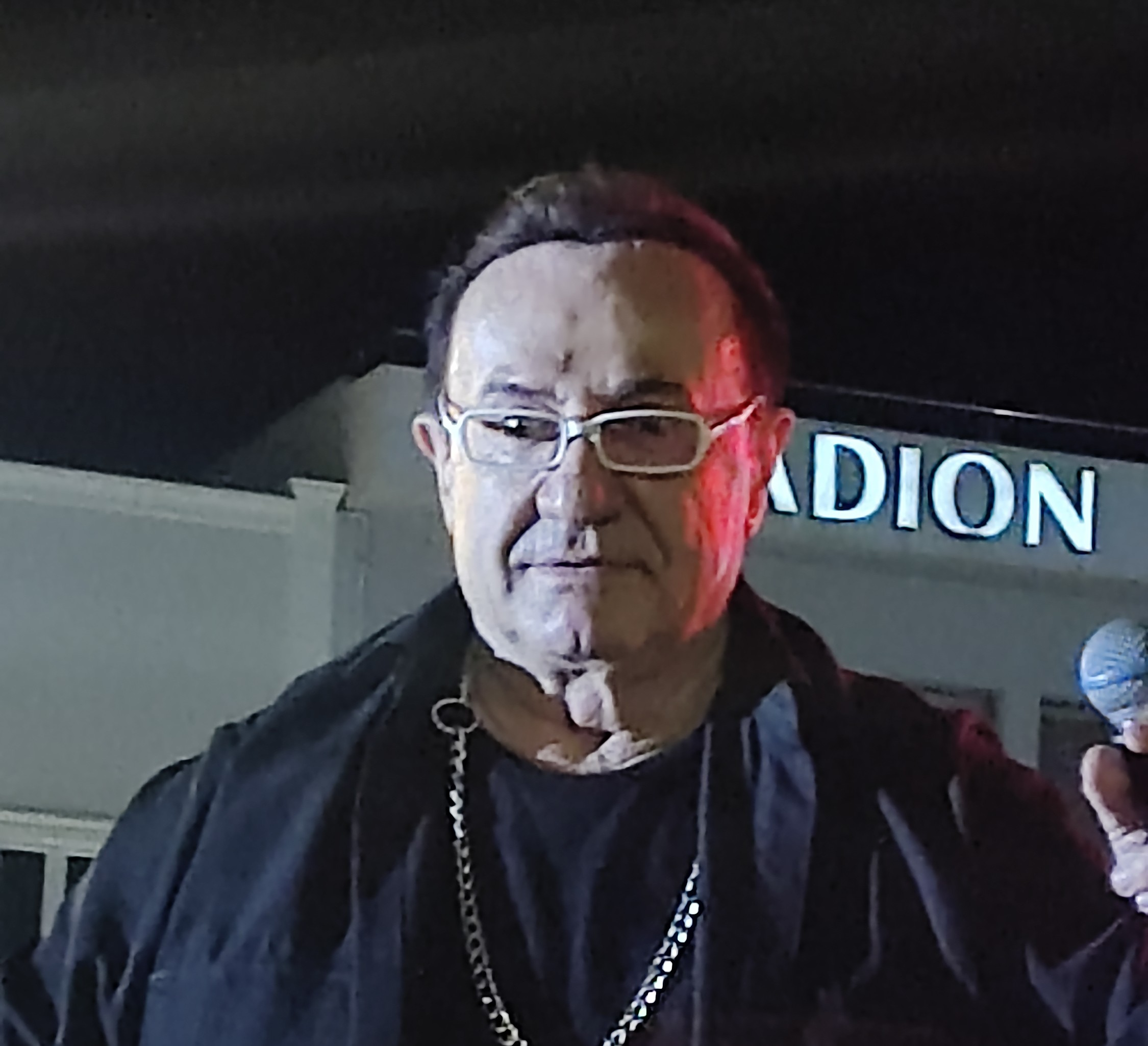
- Leftéris Pantazís in a 2023 concert in Argos, Greece
- Born: Eleutherios Pagkozidis; 27 March 1955 (age 71); Tashkent, Uzbek SSR
- Occupations: Singer, songwriter, musician
- Years active: 1979–present
- Spouse: Zoza Metaxa
- Children: 1
- Musical career
- Origin: Greece
- Instrument: Vocals

Lefteris Pantazis (Greek: Λευτέρης Πανταζής; born 27 March 1955) who is often called by the nickname LePa by the media and his fans, is a Greek singer. He was born Eleftherios Pagkozidis (Ελευθέριος Παγκοζίδης) on 27 March 1955 to Pontic Greek parents in Tashkent, Uzbek SSR, in the USSR. His parents repatriated to Greece as refugees in the 1960s.

== Career ==
He began singing professionally in the mid-1970s and his first record was distributed in 1979. His songs belong to a genre that cannot precisely be described and in Greek it is called skiladiko (σκυλάδικo) or laika (λαϊκά). His music combines elements of traditional country folk music and modern pop. Some of his best known hits include: 'Εχω τρελάνει το Θεό' (I've driven God insane) and 'Το Ωραιότερο Πλάσμα Του Κόσμου' (The most beautiful creature in the world).

== Discography ==
His discography includes:

- 1979 Οι μεγάλες μου επιτυχίες (My greatest hits)
- 1980 Αγαπιόμαστε (We love each other)
- 1981 Πάλι μόνοι (Lonely again)
- 1982 Δύο λέξεις (Two words)
- 1983 Μια ζωή ερωτευμένος (A life in love)
- 1984 Δέστε μ' αλυσίδες την καρδιά μου (Tie my heart in chains)
- 1984 Θα φύγω μόνος (I'll leave alone)
- 1986 Σε νοσταλγώ (I think about you)
- 1987 Και μη χαθούμε, Μια βραδιά στη Φαντασία (Let's keep in touch, One night at the Fantasia)
- 1988 Εκείνη, Μια βραδιά στη Φαντασία 2 (Her, One night at the Fantasia 2)
- 1989 Ταραχή, Μια βραδιά στον Πανταζή, (Turmoil, One night at Pantazis')
- 1990 Υπάρχει κανείς; (Anybody there?)
- 1991 Τηλεπάθεια, Συμμετοχή με Μίμη Πλέσσα (Telepathy, with Mimi Plessa)
- 1992 Θέλεις;, Θυμισέ μου τ' όνομά σου, Μια βραδιά στα μπουζούκια (Would you like? Remind me of your name, One night at the bouzoukia)
- 1993 Σαλονικιώτικο φεγγάρι, Εγώ δεν είμαι εγώ (Salonikan moon, I am not here)
- 1994 Ο παίχτης,Τα χρυσά σουξέ (The player, The golden soukse)
- 1995 Δικαίωμά μου, Live at must club (My right)
- 1996 Eλεύθερος, Εμπειρίες, Ο ΛΕΠΑ τραγουδάει Ζαμπέτα (Free, Experiences, LEPA sings at the Zambeta)
- 1997 Έρχεται (He is coming)
- 1998 Θάλασσα, Αν μ'αγαπάς (Sea, If you love me)
- 1999 Δε θα με δει κανείς να κλαίω (Nobody will see me cry)
- 2000 Ότι καλύτερο, φιλάκια (Whatever's best, kisses)
- 2001 Στον έβδομο ουρανό, Ένα αστέρι στ' αστέρια (To the seventh sky, One star in the stars)
- 2002 Κάτι τρέχει, Για πρώτη φορά (Something's going on, For the first time)
- 2003 Le cabaret (The cabaret)
- 2004 1000 βανίλια (1000 vanilla)
- 2005 Άλλος άνθρωπος, Συμμετοχή με master tempo (Another person, with Master Tempo)
- 2006 Άντζελα Δημητρίου - Λευτέρης Πανταζής 72 live επιτυχίες (Angela Dimitriou - Lefteris Pantazis 72 live hits)
