= Vlospa =

Greek rapper and songwriter (born 1995)

- Born: 21 May 1995 (age 31); Nice, France
- Genre: Hip hop
- Occupations: Rapper, songwriter

Vlospa (born 21 May 1995) is a Greek rapper and songwriter.

== Biography ==
Born to a Greek father and a French mother, Vlospa grew up between Nice and Kalamaria, a suburb of Thessaloniki. Vlospa lived for almost a decade in Nice, France where he recorded his first singles. Deeply connected to the French hip-hop culture, one of the most famous worldwide, from an early age Vlospa started working on the mix of French and Greek rap in his own unique way, which made him known first in Greece.

His bilingual lyrics helped him stand out from other hip hop artists, with his Spotify & YouTube singles always garnering millions of listens & views within the first few days of release. This even culminated with his first personal album "Mektoub" which is a crossover of street style and finesse.

He co-produced the Greek entry at Eurovision 2024 in Malmö, Sweden.

Sunglasses are Vlospa's trademark and he wears them at every concert and promo photo shoot, as well as in every public appearance. The “Mektoub Sunglasses” released with Die Nasty became a hit with the popular artist's audience, resulting in their stock being sold out quickly.

== Discography ==
- Veni Vidi Votsi (2018)
- Mektoub (2020)
- Mektoub 2 (2023)
- Inside Story (2024)
- Paidia Tou Feggariou (2025)
