= Helena Paparizou discography =

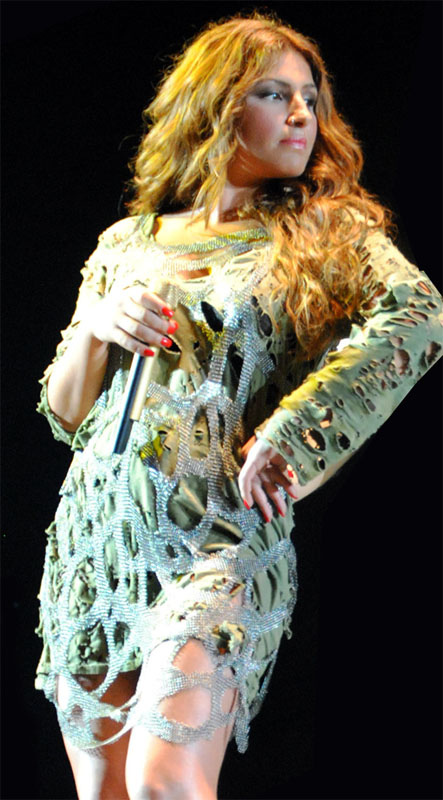
- Studio albums: 10
- Extended plays: 19
- Soundtrack albums: 3
- Compilation albums: 2
- Singles: 63
- Video albums: 4
- Music videos: 67
- Collaborations: 18
- Tours: 29
- Residency Shows: 19

The discography of Swedish-born Greek singer Helena Paparizou consists of eleven studio albums (eight in Greek and three in English, including the "My Number One" edition in Europe), two official compilation albums, nineteen extended plays, sixty-two singles (including seventeen as a featured artist), four video albums, sixty-seven music videos and she has participated in three soundtracks. Helena Paparizou was awarded several times by the Greek IFPI for selling more than 300,000 albums in her solo career and, besides, having sold a total of 100,000 CD singles.

Paparizou made her solo debut career in December 2003 with the single "Anapandites Kliseis", which peaked at number one in Greece, where it was subsequently certified gold. In 2005, she represented Greece in the Eurovision Song Contest with the song "My Number One", which she won. It is the first Greek win in the contest's history and transformed her career. Her first album Protereotita was subsequently certified double platinum by the International Federation of the Phonographic Industry of Greece. Paparizou's first international album was released in the summer of the same year, after the start of her collaboration with the Sony Music globally. The international singles "My Number One", "Mambo!" and "Heroes", achieved worldwide recognition. The first of these singles reaching number eight on the US Billboard's Dance Club Songs, and the other two singles reaching on the US Billboard's Eurochart Hot 100 list.

Her three subsequent albums Iparhi Logos (2006), The Game of Love (2006) and Vrisko To Logo Na Zo (2008), all peaked at number one in Greece and reached platinum sales. Her fifth studio album Giro Apo T' Oneiro (2010) was also certified platinum in physical stores, but also went eleven times platinum with record sales from a newspaper. Paparizou's final release before she left Sony Music, Greatest Hits & More (2011), was her first compilation album and included "Baby It's Over", her biggest hit until 2016.

From 2013 she had signed a multi-territory deal with Universal Music, which has exclusive agreements with labels across the Universal Music Group, including Minos EMI in Greece and Capitol Music in Sweden. Since then he has released various albums Ti Ora Tha Vgoume? (2013), One Life (2014) and Ouranio Toxo (2017) with her biggest hit to date "An Me Dis Na Kleo", which has gained over 30 million views on YouTube. Ouranio Toxo was certified platinum in Greece. Her tenth studio album, Apohrosis (2021), has a music video in every song and Paparizou did the production on it.

Paparizou is one of the most successful singers in Europe with high sales in the music industry and numerous awards, especially in Greece, in Cyprus and in Sweden. In 2010, Forbes listed Paparizou as the 21st most powerful and influential celebrity in Greece.

== Studio albums ==
Title	Album details	Peak chart positions			Sales	Certifications (sales thresholds)
Title	Album details	GRE	CYP	SWE	Sales	Certifications (sales thresholds)
Protereotita	Released: June 27, 2004; Label: Sony Music/ Columbia; Formats: CD, CD/DVD, Digital Download	1	1	–	GRE: 87,000 (including My Number One); CYP: 10,000 (including My Number One)	GRE: 2× Platinum; CYP: Platinum
My Number One	Released: May 17, 2005; Labels: Sony BMG, Bonnier Amigo; Formats: CD, CD/DVD, Digital Download	1	1	13	GRE: See Protereotita; CYP: See Protereotita	
Iparhi Logos	Released: April 12, 2006; Label: Sony BMG/ RCA; Formats: CD, CD/DVD, Digital Download	1	1	–	GRE: 40,000; CYP: 8,000	GRE: Platinum; CYP: Platinum
The Game of Love	Released: October 25, 2006; Labels: Sony BMG/ RCA, Gallo Record; Formats: CD, Digital Download	1	1	18	GRE: 40,000; CYP: 6,000	GRE: Platinum; CYP: Platinum
Vrisko To Logo Na Zo	Released: June 12, 2008; Label: Sony BMG/ RCA; Formats: CD, Digital Download, DVD	1	2	–	GRE: 30,000	GRE: Platinum
Giro Apo T' Oneiro	Released: March 28, 2010; Label: Sony BMG/ RCA; Formats: CD, Digital Download	1	1	–	GRE: 140.000 ^{[A]}	GRE: Platinum
Ti Ora Tha Vgoume?	Released: June 3, 2013; Label: Minos EMI; Formats: CD, Digital Download	1	3	–		
One Life	Released: March 26, 2014; Labels: Capitol Music, Universal Music, Minos EMI; Formats: CD, Digital Download	3	2	11		
Ouranio Toxo	Released: December 15, 2017; Label: Minos EMI; Formats: CD, Digital Download	1	1	–	GRE: 12,000	GRE: Platinum
Apohrosis	Released: January 29, 2021; Label: Minos EMI; Formats: CD, Digital Download	1	7			

== Compilation albums ==
Title	Album details	Peak chart positions	
Title	Album details	GRE	CYP
Greatest Hits & More	Released: May 23, 2011; Label: Sony Music/ RCA; Formats: CD, Digital Download	2	3
The Golden Years	Released: February 4 2025; Label: Sony Music/Panik Records; Formats: CD, Digital Download	-	-

== Soundtrack albums ==
Title	Album details	Peak chart positions		Sales	Certifications (sales thresholds)
Title	Album details	GRE	CYP	Sales	Certifications (sales thresholds)
Mazi Sou	Released: May 18, 2007; Label: Sony BMG/ RCA; Formats: CD, Digital Download	1	1	GRE: 15,000	GRE: Gold
To Fili Tis Zois	Released: November, 2007; Label: Sony BMG; Formats: CD, Digital Download	9	–	GRE: 15,000	GRE: Gold
Voutia Sto Galazio	Released: June 26, 2018; Label: Minos EMI; Formats: Digital Download	–	–		

== Others ==
=== Extended plays and CD singles ===
Album details	Notes
Anapandites Kliseis: Released: December 28, 2003; Label: Sony BMG Greece/Columbia; Formats: CD, digital download	Released in Greece and Cyprus.; Contains three tracks.; #1 in Greece; Gold in Greece (20,000 Copies)
My Number One: Released: March 24, 2005; Label: Sony BMG Greece/Columbia; Formats: CD, digital download	Released in Europe and the United States.; Contains two tracks.; #1 in Greece; Platinum in Greece (40,000 Copies), Gold in Sweden (20,000 Copies)
Mambo!: Released: November 24, 2005; Label: Sony BMG Greece/Columbia; Formats: CD, digital download	Released in Europe and the United States.; Features both Greek/English versions of "Mambo!", and other three tracks.; 10 weeks at #1; Platinum in Greece (30,000 Copies), Gold in Sweden (20,000 Copies)
Fos: Released: May 23, 2007; Label: Sony BMG Greece/RCA; Formats: CD, digital download	Released in Greece and Cyprus.; Contains five tracks.; #1 in Greece; Gold in Greece (10,000 Copies)
Helena Goes Clubbin': Released: September 2009; Label: Sony BMG Greece/RCA; Formats: Promotional use	Features the radio-edit of "Pirotehnimata" and the two remixes were from Paparizou's performances at the MAD Video Music Awards 2008.; It is not available for purchase.
Baby It's Over Remixes: Released: April 15, 2011; Label: Sony Music Greece/RCA; Formats: Digital download	Contains four remixes of "Baby It's Over". Two remixes by Swedish DJs "Supermarkets" and two remixes by UK DJs "The Thin Red Men".
Save Me (This Is An SOS) - Soundfactory Remixes: Released: July 24, 2013; Label: Lionheart Music Group; Formats: Digital download	Including four remixes of "Save Me" by SoundFactory.
Survivor: Released: February 22, 2014; Label: Lionheart Music Group; Formats: Digital download	Including the original version and an instrumental version.; Gold in Sweden (20,000 Copies)
Survivor The Remixes: Released: April 29, 2014; Label: Lionheart Music Group; Formats: Digital download	Including two remixes of "Survivor" by SoundFactory.
Otan Aggeli Klene (Angel): Released: February 23, 2015; Label: EMI Music Greece; Formats: Digital download	Including the Greek version and a singback version.
Angel: Released: April 24, 2015; Label: Capitol Music Group; Formats: Digital download	Including the original version and a singback version.
Haide: Released: April 28, 2017; Label: EMI Music Greece; Formats: Digital download	Features both Greek/English versions of "Haide", and a Summer Breeze Mix.
Summer Extended 2017: Released: June 27, 2017; Label: EMI Music Greece; Formats: Digital download	Contains the official anthem of Colour Day Festival 2017 "Colour Your Dreams", and five other tracks.
Etsi Ki Etsi / Totally Erased: Released: May 11, 2018; Label: Capitol Music Group Sweden; Formats: Digital download	Contains four remixes of "Etsi Ki Etsi" and four remixes of "Totally Erased".
Mila Mou: Released: May 25, 2020; Label: EMI Music Greece; Formats: Digital download	Contains the original version, the acoustic version and a remix from Levianth.
Gia Pia Agapi: Released: July 2, 2021; Label: EMI Music Greece; Formats: Digital download	Contains the duet of "Gia Pia Agapi" with Anastasios Rammos and the original version.
Lightning: Released: November 22, 2021; Label: EMI Music Greece; Formats: Digital download	Contains the original song and a Club Remix by Levianth.
Party All The Time: Released: July 05, 2024; Label: EMI Music Greece; Formats: Digital download	Contains Pirotehnimata, Anapandites Kliseis, Treli Kardia Remixed by Playmen and bonus track Mavra Gialia.
Update: Released: November 18, 2024; Label: EMI Music Greece; Formats: Digital download	Contains Update, Mavra Gialia & Den Mou Ta Leei Kala.

== Singles ==
=== As lead artist ===
List of singles as lead artist, with selected chart positions and certifications, showing year released and album name
Year	Title	Peak chart positions				Certifications	Album
Year	Title	GRE	CYP	SWE	Other charts	Certifications	Album
2003	"Anapandites Kliseis"	1	1	—	—	GRE: Gold	Protereotita
2004	"Treli Kardia"	4	2	—	—		Protereotita
2004	"Antitheseis"	5	1	—	—		Protereotita
2004	"Katse Kala"	3	1	—	—		Protereotita
2005	"Stin Kardia Mou Mono Thlipsi"	17	5	—	—		Protereotita
2005	"My Number One"	1	1	1	AUT: 44; BEL (Vl): 10; BEL (Wa): 36; GER: 37; NED: 24; ROM: 11; SWI: 15; TUR: 33	GLF: 8× Platinum; GRE: Platinum	My Number One
2005	"The Light in Our Soul" / "To Fos Sti Psyhi"	2	1	3	TUR: 9		My Number One
2005	"A Brighter Day"	—	—	24	—		My Number One
2006	"Mambo!"	1	1	5	BEL: 18; BUL: 10; TUR: 40	GLF: Gold; GRE: Platinum	Iparhi Logos
2006	"Iparhi Logos"	3	1	—	—		Iparhi Logos
2006	"Gigolo"	6	1	11	BUL: 13; NOR: 12; TUR: 38		Iparhi Logos
2006	"An Ihes Erthi Pio Noris"	3	1	—	—		Iparhi Logos
2006	"Heroes"	—	—	1	—	GLF: Gold	The Game Of Love
2006	"Teardrops"	1	1	—	—		The Game Of Love
2007	"Fos"	1	—	—	—	GRE: Gold	Iparhi Logos: Platinum Edition
2007	"Mazi sou"	1	1	—	—	GRE: Gold	Iparhi Logos: Platinum Edition
2007	"Min Fevgeis"	2	2	—	—		Iparhi Logos: Platinum Edition
2007	"To Fili Tis Zois"	1	1	—	—	GRE: Platinum	Vrisko To Logo Na Zo
2008	"Porta Gia Ton Ourano"	1	1	—	—	GRE: Gold	Vrisko To Logo Na Zo
2008	"I Kardia Sou Petra"	1	2	—	—	GRE: Gold	Vrisko To Logo Na Zo
2008	"Pirotehnimata"	2	5	—	—	GRE: Platinum	Vrisko To Logo Na Zo
2009	"Eisai I Foni"	40	14	—	—		Vrisko To Logo Na Zo
2009	"Tha 'Mai Allios"	2	2	—	—		Giro Apo T' Oneiro
2010	"An Isouna Agapi"	7	—	—	—		Giro Apo T' Oneiro
2010	"Psahno Tin Alitheia"	17	7	—	—		Giro Apo T' Oneiro
2010	"Girna Me Sto Htes (All around the dream Remix)"	7	2	—	—		Giro Apo T' Oneiro
2011	"Baby It's Over"	1	1	262	BUL: 10	GRE: Gold	Greatest Hits & More
2011	"Oti Niotho Den Allazi" / "Love Me Crazy"	4	2	—	—		Greatest Hits & More
2011	"Mr. Perfect"	7	1	—	—		Non-album singles
2012	"Popular"	—	—	30	—		Non-album singles
2013	"Poso M'Aresei"	3	2	—	—		Ti Ora Tha Vgoume?
2013	"Ena Lepto"	4	8	—	—		Ti Ora Tha Vgoume?
2013	"Save Me (This Is An SOS)"	4	2	25	—		Ti Ora Tha Vgoume? and One Life
2013	"De Thelo Allon Iroa"	17	4	—	—		Ti Ora Tha Vgoume?
2014	"Survivor"	—	—	3	—	GLF: Gold	One Life
2014	"Don't Hold Back On Love"	67	—	—	—		One Life
2015	"Otan Aggeli Klene" / "Angel"	3	3	76	—		Ouranio Toxo
2016	"Misi Kardia"	25	5	—	—		Ouranio Toxo
2016	"Fiesta"	1	1	—	—		Ouranio Toxo
2016	"Agkaliase Me"	41	23	—	—		Ouranio Toxo
2017	"Haide"	1	1	62	BUL: 1		Ouranio Toxo
2017	"An Me Deis Na Kleo" (featuring Anastasios Rammos)	1	1	—	BUL: 15	GRE: Platinum	Ouranio Toxo
2017	"Etsi Ki Etsi"	3	3	—	—		Ouranio Toxo
2018	"Kati Skoteino"	2	3	—	—		Apohrosis
2018	"Hristougenna Xana" / "It Is Christmas"	8	15	—	—		Non-album single
2019	"Askopa Xenihtia"	1	1	—	—		Apohrosis
2019	"Kalokairi Kai Pathos"	8	3	—	—		Non-album single
2020	"Etsi Einai I Fasi" (with Sakis Rouvas)	8	13	—	—		Apohrosis
2020	"Mila Mou"	10	15	—	—		Apohrosis
2020	"Se Xeno Soma"	1	1	—	—		Apohrosis
2021	"Deja Vu" (featuring Marseaux)	1	1	—	FIN: 3	GRE: Platinum	Apohrosis
2021	"Gia Pia Agapi" (solo or duet with Anastasios Rammos)	15	3	—	—		Apohrosis
2021	"Mia Stagona Amartia"	23	25	—	—		Apohrosis
2021	"Lightning" (with Levianth)	2	—	—	—		Non-album single
2022	"Mi"	31	28	—	—		Apohrosis
2022	"Ti Ti" (with Nikos Panagiotidis as Antique)	3	3	—	—		Non-album singles
2022	"Katse Kala (Arcade Remake)" (with Marseaux and Joanne)	17	25	—	—	GRE: Platinum	Non-album singles
2022	"Fevgo"	16	—	—	—		Non-album singles
2023	"De Mou Ta Leei Kala"	4	7	—	—	GRE: Platinum	Update
2024	"Mavra Gialia"	18	12	—	—	GRE: Gold	Update
2024	"Update"	38	—	—	—		Update
2025	"Kalinihta"	27	—	—	—		Update
2026	"Alitheia Tora"	13	—	—	—		

=== As featured artist ===
List of singles as featured artist, with selected chart positions, showing year released and album name
Year	Title	Peak chart positions			Album
Year	Title	Greece	Cyprus	SWE	Album
2004	"Anapantites Kliseis" (Christos Dantis featuring Helena Paparizou)	1	4	—	Maya Maya
2007	"I Zileia Monaxia" (Nikos Aliagas featuring Helena Paparizou)	29	—	—	Rendez-vous
2008	"Mesa Sou (VMA Version)" (Stavento featuring Helena Paparizou)	1	3	—	Greatest Hits & More
2010	"Fysika Mazi" (Playmen featuring Onirama and Helena Paparizou)	2	4	—	Greatest Hits & More
2011	"Dari Dari" (Nana Mouskouri and Helena Paparizou)	—	—	—	Tragoudia Apo Ta Ellinika Nisia
2012	"All the Time" (Playmen featuring Helena Paparizou, Riskykidd and Courtney)	2	1	—	Playbook
2012	"Lathos Agapes" (Natassa Theodoridou and Helena Paparizou)	11	3	—	Stigmes
2013	"Stin Akri Tou Kosmou" (Stavento featuring Helena Paparizou)	18	2	—	Stin Akri Tou Kosmou
2015	"Love Till It's Over" (HouseTwins featuring Helena Paparizou)	10	—	—	Non-album single
2016	"You Are The Only One" (Sergey Lazarev featuring Helena Paparizou)	—	136	—	The One
2017	"Fige" (Evridiki featuring Helena Paparizou)	—	—	—	25 Gia Panta
2018	"Ola Moiazoun Kalokairi" (Melisses and Helena Paparizou)	1	1	—	Non-album single
2018	"Total Disguise" (Serhat featuring Helena Paparizou)	1	—	—	That's How I Feel
2021	"Mono Gia Kini Mi Mou Les" (Helena Paparizou and Stavento)	—	—	—	O Prigipas Tis Ditikis Ochthis
2021	"Day And Night" (Magnus Carlsson and Helena Paparizou)	—	—	1	Atmosphere
2021	"Twist In My Sobriety" (Joanne and Helena Paparizou)	—	—	—	Twist In My Sobriety EP
2022	"Kommatia" (Stelios Rokkos featuring Helena Paparizou)	—	—	—	Anasa
2025	"Latrevo" (Konstantinos Christoforou featuring Helena Paparizou)	—	—	—	Ta Disco Mas Kalokairia

=== Promotional singles ===
List of promotional singles, with selected chart positions, showing year released and album name
Year	Title	Peak chart positions			Album
Year	Title	GRE	CYP	SWE	Album
2003	"Anapantites Kliseis (SMS Remix)"	—	—	—	Protereotita
2005	"O.K."	8	—	—	My Number One
2005	"Let's Get Wild"	24	—	—	My Number One
2006	"The Game Of Love"	12	10	—	The Game of Love
2007	"Na Ksipnao Kai Na Mai Mazi Sou (Edo Na Zeis)"	—	—	—	Mazi Sou O.S.T
2007	"Ola Einai Mousiki"	—	—	—	Non-album promotional singles
2008	"3 Is A Magic Number"	—	—	—	Non-album promotional singles
2014	"Kenourgia Agapi" (featuring Yuri Melikov)	—	—	—	Non-album promotional singles
2016	"Zoi Mou"	56	24	—	Non-album promotional singles
2016	"Pou Pige Tosi Agapi"	—	—	—	Iparhi Logos
2017	"Colour Your Dream (Colour Day Festival 2017 Official Anthem)"	12	—	—	Summer Extended 2017 EP
2021	"Kathara Ta Dio Mou Heria Ta Krato"	—	—	—	Non-album promotional singles
2022	"To Fos Stin Psihi - The Light In Our Soul (Powered by UNICEF)" (with Pediki Horodia Spirou Lambrou)	—	—	—	Non-album promotional singles
2025	"O Erotas Grafetai" (with Panos Mouzourakis)	—	—	—	Non-album promotional singles
2026	"To Kalo Epistrefi"	—	—	—	Non-album promotional singles

=== Other charted singles and songs ===
Year	Title	Peak chart positions				Album
Year	Title	GRE	CYP	SWE	Other charts	Album
2004	"Taxidi Gia To Agnosto"	—	—	—	—	Protereotita
2004	"(Eheis Kairo Na Mou Fereis) Louloudia"	—	—	—	—	Protereotita
2005	"I Don't Want You Here Anymore (Anapandites Kliseis)"	—	—	—	—	My Number One
2005	"Panda Se Perimena (Idaniko Fili)"	5	5	—	—	Iparhi Logos
2005	"I Agapi Sou Den Meni Pia Edo (Aşkın Açamadığı Kapı)"	18	—	—	—	Protereotita: Euro Edition + Mambo! and Iparhi Logos: Platinum Edition
2006	"Paradigmatos Hari"	13	17	—	—	Iparhi Logos
2006	"Se Pion Na Miliso"	26	31	—	—	Iparhi Logos
2006	"Don't Speak (Live)"	44	—	—	—	Iparhi Logos
2006	"You Set My Heart On Fire"	15	—	34	—	Iparhi Logos and The Game of Love
2006	"Somebody's Burning (Put The Fire Out)"	13	9	—	—	The Game of Love
2006	"Carpe Diem (Seize the Day)"	35	—	—	—	The Game of Love
2008	"Papeles Mojados" (with Chambao)	—	—	—	SPA: 9	Vrisko To Logo Na Zo
2008	"To 'His I Den To 'His"	—	—	—	—	Vrisko To Logo Na Zo
2008	"Porta Gia Ton Ourano (VMA Remix)"	1	1	—	—	Helena Goes Clubbin
2010	"San Kai 'Sena"	—	—	—	—	Giro Apo T'Oneiro
2010	"Den Allazo"	—	—	—	—	Giro Apo T'Oneiro
2010	"Dancing Without Music"	—	—	—	—	Giro Apo T'Oneiro
2012	"Mr. Perfect (Playmen Remix)"	3	1	—	—	Non-album singles
2012	"Poios (Unplugged Version)"	11	6	—		Non-album singles
2013	"Sou Stelno SOS"	—	—	—	—	Ti Ora Tha Vgoume?
2013	"Ti Ora The Vgoume"	—	—	—	—	Ti Ora Tha Vgoume?
2014	"One Life"	—	—	—	—	One Life
2014	"Set Your Heart On Me"	—	—	—	—	One Life
2014	"4 Another 1"	—	—	—	—	One Life
2014	"Enough" (with Jill Johnson)	—	—	27	—	One Life
2017	"Tora I Pote (Ora O Mai Piú)" (with Tamta)	—	—	—	—	Ouranio Toxo
2017	"Palia Mou Agapi" (featuring Mark Angelo)	—	—	—	—	Ouranio Toxo
2017	"Ouranio Toxo" (featuring Faith Erhe)	—	—	—	—	Ouranio Toxo
2017	"Haide (Phoebus Remix)"	5	—	—	—	Ouranio Toxo
2018	"Ouranio Toxo (MAD VMA 2018)" (featuring Idra Kayne)	—	—	—	—	Non-album singles
2019	"Kalokairi Kai Pathos (MAD VMA 2019 Version)" (featuring Iasonas Mandilas)	—	—	—	—	Non-album singles
2021	"Adiexodo"	64	—	—	—	Apohrosis
2021	"Apohrosis"	—	—	—	—	Apohrosis
2021	"Den Epestrepsa"	—	—	—	—	Apohrosis
2021	"Anamoni"	—	—	—	—	Apohrosis
2024	"Pirotehnimata - Playmen Remix"	—	—	—	—	Party All The Time EP
2024	"Anapantites Klisis - Playmen Remix"	—	—	—	—	Party All The Time EP
2024	"Treli Kardia - Playmen Remix"	—	—	—	—	Party All The Time EP

== Music videos ==
Year	Title	Director(s)	Notes
2003	"Anapantites Kliseis"	Manolis Tzirakis	
2004	"Treli Kardia"	Giorgos Gavalos	This music video was filmed in football court in which played Olympiakos and Panathinaikos
2004	"Antitheseis"	Manolis Tzirakis	
2004	"Katse Kala"	Giorgos Gavalos	
2004	"Stin Kardia Mou Mono Thlipsi"	Manolis Tzirakis	This music video was made of a television interview special she had done in Stockholm for Greek show Taksidevontas stin Stockholmi me tin Elena Paparizou
2005	"My Number One"	Kostas Kapetanidis	It is the winning song of the Eurovision Song Contest 2005
2005	"To Fos Stin Psihi / The Light In Our Soul"	Manolis Tzirakis	Greeklish version
2005	"The Light In Our Soul"	Manolis Tzirakis	English version
2006	"Mambo!"	Manolis Tzirakis	Greeklish version
2006	"Mambo!"	Manolis Tzirakis	English version
2006	"Mambo!"	Manolis Tzirakis	International version
2006	"Iparhi Logos"	White Room	
2006	"Just Walk Away"	Manolis Tzirakis	Live version of Celine Dion's "Just Walk Away"
2006	"Gigolo"	White Room	Greeklish version
2006	"Gigolo"	White Room	English version
2006	"My Number One (Josh Harris Mix)"	Kostas Kapetanidis	Remix edition from the winning song
2006	"Fos"	Giorgos Gavalos	The soundtrack of the "Barbie in the 12 Dancing Princesses"
2006	"An Eihes Erthei Pio Noris"	Giorgos Gavalos	
2007	"Mazi Sou"	Giorgos Gavalos	The soundtrack of the television series "Mazi Sou"
2007	"Mi Fevgeis"	Kostas Kapetanidis	
2007	"To Fili Tis Zois"	Alexandros Grammatopoulos	The soundtrack of the film "To Fili Tis Zois"
2007	"I Zileia Monaksia" (featuring Nikos Aliagas)	Giorgos Gavalos	
2008	"Porta Gia Ton Ourano"	Alexandros Grammatopoulos	
2008	"I Kardia Sou Petra"	Alexandros Grammatopoulos	
2008	"Pirotehnimata"	Alexandros Grammatopoulos	
2009	"Eisai I Foni"	Kostas Kapetanidis	A live performance from her Greek tour "To Party Arhizei"
2009	"Tha 'Mai Allios"	Maria Stoka	
2010	"An Isoun Agapi"	Konstantinos Rigos	
2010	"Psahno Tin Alitheia"	Maria Stoka	
2010	"Girna Me Sto Htes (All Around The Dream Remix)	Evagelos Kalaitzis	
2011	"Baby It's Over"	Konstantinos Rigos	
2012	"Mr. Perfect"	Konstantinos Rigos	
2012	"All the Time" (featuring Playmen, Courtney and RiskyKidd)	Apollonas Papatheoharis	
2013	"Poso M' Aresei"	Apollonas Papatheoharis	
2013	"Den Thelo Allon Iroa"	Alexandros Grammatopoulos	
2014	"Stin Akri Tou Kosmou" (featuring Stavento)	AKTO College Team	The first animation music video in Greece
2014	"Don't Hold Back On Love"	Alexandros Grammatopoulos	
2015	"Otan Aggeli Klene (Angel)"	Sherif Francis	
2015	"Love Till It's Over" (featuring HouseTwins)	Evgenios Zosimov	
2016	"Misi Kardia"	Sherif Francis	
2016	"Fiesta"	Vangelis Tsaousopoulos	Greek version
2016	"Agkaliase Me"	Vangelis Tsaousopoulos	
2017	"Haide"	Vangelis Tsaousopoulos	Greek version
2017	"Haide"	Vangelis Tsaousopoulos	English version
2017	"An Me Deis Na Kleo" (featuring Anastasios Rammos)	Dimitris Tsigos	
2017	"Etsi Ki Etsi"	Alex Konstantinidis	
2018	"Total Disguise" (featuring Serhat)	Alex Konstantinidis	
2018	"Kati Skoteino"	Alex Konstantinidis	
2019	"Askopa Xenihtia"	Alex Konstantinidis	
2019	"Kalokairi Kai Pathos"	Alex Konstantinidis	
2020	"Etsi Einai I Fasi" (featuring Sakis Rouvas)	Yiannis Papadakos	
2020	"Mila Mou"	Yiannis Papadakos	
2020	"Se Xeno Soma"	Yiannis Michelopoulos	
2021	"Deja Vu" (featuring Marseaux)	Vangelis Tsaousopoulos	
2021	"Anamoni"	Vangelis Tsaousopoulos	
2021	"Den Epestrepsa"	Vangelis Tsaousopoulos	
2021	"Mia Stagona Amartia"	Vangelis Tsaousopoulos	
2021	"Gia Pia Agapi"	Vangelis Tsaousopoulos	
2021	"Mi"	Vangelis Tsaousopoulos	
2021	"Apohrosis"	Vangelis Tsaousopoulos	
2021	"Adiexodo"	Vangelis Tsaousopoulos	
2022	"Katse Kala (Arcade Remake)" (with Marseaux and Joanne)	Alex Konstantinidis	
2022	"Fevgo"	Vangelis Tsaousopoulos	
2023	"De Mou Ta Leei Kala"	Bodega	
2024	"Mavra Gialia"	Yiannis Papadakos	
2024	"Update"	Mike Marzz	
2025	"Kalinihta"	Minos EMI	
2025	"Latrevo" (with Constantinos Christophorou)	Alex Konstantinidis	
2026	"O Erotas Grafetai" (with Panos Mouzourakis)	Dimitris Zografakis, Vasilis Mirianthopoulos	The soundtrack of the film "O Erotas Grafetai..."
2026	"To Kalo Epistrefi"	EXPERTIZ PRODUCTION	The soundtrack of the short film "To Kalo Epistrefi"

== DVD releases ==
- 2005 – Number One
- 2006 – Mad Secret Concerts
- 2008 – Live in Concert
- 2010 – Giro Apo T' Oneiro The Deluxe Edition

== Notes ==
- A. Though there are enough copies of the album in circulation to normally warrant a music sales certification, IFPI Greece does not award certifications for albums released as bonuses with newspapers and magazines.
