= Elena Paparizou & Melisses Live =

2012 concert tour by Elena Paparizou and Melisses

- Tour by Elena Paparizou
- Associated albums: Greatest Hits & More
- Start date: July 27, 2012
- End date: September __, 2012
- Legs: 2
- No. of shows: 8 in Greece; 2 in Cyprus; 10 total

Elena Paparizou concert chronology
- Elena Paparizou Live in Cyprus (2011); Elena Paparizou & Melisses Live (2012)

Elena Paparizou & Melisses Live was a co-headlining concert tour by Greek contemporary laïka and pop singer Elena Paparizou and the Greek pop band Melisses started in Pafos, Cyprus on July 27, 2012. The acts toured 10 cities in Greece and three in Cyprus, ending in September 2012. The first solo tour for Melisses, it had been after being postponed for a week due to National Cyprus Day and to the economic crisis in Greece.

== Background ==
On June 10, 2012, Elena Paparizou guest-starred on Petro Kostiopoulos's final show, "Vradi." Paparizou and Melisses performed the track "Popular" by Eric Saade as a part of their act. Originally Paparizou and Melisses stated their summer tour would begin in late June; however, tour dates were later changed. Tour dates were publicized on Paparizou and Melisses' official Facebook pages.

== Set list ==
1. "All The Time
2. "Baby It's Over"
3. "Girna Me Sto Htes (Around The Dream Remix)"
4. "Porta Gia Ton Ourano"
5. "To Fili Tis Zois"
6. "An Ihes Erthi Pio Noris"
7. "Poios (VMA Unplugged version)"
8. "Popular"
9. "Krata Ta Matia Sou Kleista" feat. Melisses
10. "Treli Kardia" feat. Melisses
11. "Krifa" by Melisses
12. "San Kai Sena"
13. "Iparhi Logos"
14. "Tha 'Mai Allios"
15. "I Kardia Sou Petra"
16. "Anapandites Kliseis"
17. "Fisika Mazi" feat. Melisses
18. "O,ti Niotho Den Allazi (Love Me Crazy)"
19. "Pirotehnimata"
20. "I Hate Myself"/"Mr. Perfect (Playmen Remix)"
21. "Mambo!"
22. "Gigolo"
23. "Macarena" feat. Melisses
24. "Ai Se Eu Te Pego" feat. Melisses
25. "Mesa Sou (VMA Version)" (Melisses feat. Helena Paparizou)
26. "Abares" feat. Melisses
27. "My Number One" (Duet with Melisses)
28. "I Gi Girizei (Duet with Melisses)
29. "Den Kanei Krio Stin Ellada" (Duet with Melisses)
30. "An Isouna Agapi"

== Tour dates ==
Date	City	Country	Venue	Attendance/Max. capacity
Europe
July 27, 2012	Paphos	Cyprus	Summer Club	1,000/1,000
August 18, 2012	Katerini	Greece	Municipal Stadium Pierikou	5,500/5,500
August 24, 2012	Mytilene	Greece	Castle	7,000/7,000
August 31, 2012	Amfissa	Greece	Municipal Stadium	/N/A
September 2012	Loutraki	Greece	Level 2 Loutraki	0/N/A
September 8, 2012	Nicosia	Cyprus	Presidential Palace	/N/A
September 2012	Rhodes	Greece		/N/A
September 2012	Patras	Greece		/N/A
September 2012	Mykonos	Greece		/N/A
September 2012	Athens	Greece		/N/A

== Performers ==
Lead performers

- Elena Paparizou, vocals
- Christos Mastoras (Melisses), vocals

Melisses band members

- Musical director: Christos
- Drums: Iakovos
- Bass: Kostas
- Guitar: Thanos

== Credits ==
=== Performance ===
- Director: Kostas Kapetanidis
- Art director: Fokas Evangelinos
- Instrumentation/arrangement: Thanasis Hondros, DONK (Niclas Oaulsson and Toni Mavridis)
- LED/lighting designer: Paris Anagnostopoulos
- Sound: Nikos Chronopoulos, Giannis Xidakis, Spathi Eleni
- Choreography: Fokas Evangelinos

=== Production ===
- Production arrangement: Andri Orfanidou/Galaxias Paragoges, Kostas Christopoulos/Four Seasons
- Production manager: Gerasimos Sideridis
- Tour manager: Konstantinos Bletsas
- Communications and public relations: Giannis Koutrakis, Hara Zafarika/Piarista O.E.
- Television production: OBVAM AGM
- Video operator and G-LEC engineer: Elias Binieris
- Technicians: Andreas Georgiou, Michalis Petridis, Giorgos Tikou, Alexis Paterlis, Alexis Petraï, Giannis Triandafyllou, Dinos Freskos, Babis Tsakoumatos, Dimitris Andriannos, Gouseff Chalil
- Editing: Tasos Bitsakakis
- Post-production: Art Factory

=== Personnel ===
- Make-up: Giannis Marketakis (effex+)
- Hair: Christos Kalaniotis (effex+)
- Styling: Al Giga (Elena Paparizou), Kostas Zisis (dancers)
- Backstage personal management: Filio Zioga, Vergos Michalis
