= List of awards and nominations received by Helena Paparizou =

Helena Paparizou awards and nominations
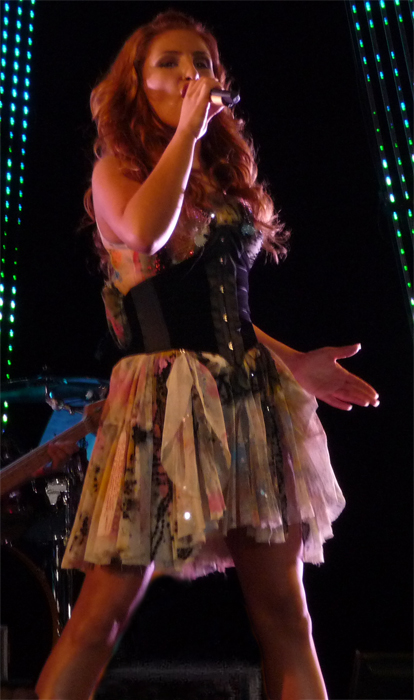
- Paparizou Live in Kavala
Award	Wins	Nominations
Arion Music Awards	3	13
Balkan Music Awards	1	4
Cyprus Music Awards	3	6
European Border Breakers Award	1	1
Eurovision Song Contest	2	3
Greek Shipping Awards	0	1
Life & Style Women of the Year Awards	1	2
MAD Video Music Awards	35	66
MTV Europe Music Awards	1	2
OGAE Awards	2	5
- Totals
Awards won	49
Nominations	103

This is a comprehensive list of awards won by Helena Paparizou, a Swedish-Greek singer-songwriter.

== Arion Music Awards ==
The Arion Music Awards were the official Greek music awards organized by Greece's charting authority, IFPI Greece. Debuting in 2002, they were the successor of the Hellenic Music Pop Corn Awards which were organized by the magazine Pop Star since the early 1990s until 2001. The Arions were held for the first five years by the Mega Channel and later by ANT1 until their demise in 2007 due to low interest and ratings. The awards were usually held in April but in 2007 were held in October due to the network change. Paparizou has won three awards from thirteen nominations.

Year	Nominated work	Award	Result
2004	Protereotita	Best Pop Album	Nominated
2004	Protereotita	Female Singer of the Year	Nominated
2005	Protereotita	Best Female Pop Singer	Won
2005	Protereotita	Best Pop Album	Nominated
2006	Protereotita: Euro Edition	Best Female Pop Singer	Nominated
2006	"My Number One"	Song of the Year	Nominated
2006	"My Number One"(Kostas Kapetanidis)	Video of the Year	Nominated
2006	Protereotita: Euro Edition	Singer of the Year	Won
2006	Protereotita: Euro Edition	Best Pop Album	Nominated
2006	"My Number One"	Best Pop Song	Nominated
2007	Iparhi Logos	Female Artist of the Year	Won
2007	Iparhi Logos	Album of the Year	Nominated
2007	"Αn Eihes Erthei Pio Noris"	Video of the Year	Nominated
2007	Iparhi Logos	Best Pop Album	Nominated
2007	"Αn Eihes Erthei Pio Noris"	Best Pop Song	Nominated

== Balkan Music Awards ==
The Balkan Music Award is an annual Balkan music award show held every year in different cities of the Balkans. The first edition of the show was held on May 16, 2010 in Sofia, Bulgaria, where many famous and young Balkan artists were awarded. The show is organised and hosted by Balkanika Music Television.

Year	Nominated work	Award	Result
2010	"Tha 'Mai Allios"	Best Song In Balkans From Greece	Nominated
2011	"An Isouna Agapi"	Best Song In Balkans From Greece	Won
2011	"An Isouna Agapi"	Best Song In Balkans	Nominated
2011	"An Isouna Agapi"	Best Video Clip In Balkans	Nominated

== Cyprus Music Awards ==
The Cyprus Music Awards are held annually by Cyprus College in Cyprus since 2007.

Year	Nominated work	Award	Result
2006	Protereotita: Euro Edition + Mambo!	Best-selling Greek Album Of The Year	Won
2006	Mambo!	CD-Single of the Year	Nominated
2006	My Number One	Best Direction	Nominated
2006	Mambo!	Best Female Artist	Nominated
2007	Iparhi Logos	Singer of the Year	Nominated
2007	The Game Of Love	Best-selling International Album of the Year	Nominated
2007	Iparhi Logos	Best-selling Greek Album of the Year	Nominated
2007	Iparhi Logos	Album of the Year	Nominated

== European Border Breakers Awards ==
The European Border Breakers Awards are held annually by the European Union. They were created by the European Union in 2004 and are given to ten artists who manage to have success with their debut album abroad.

Year	Nominated work	Award
2007	Protereotita: Euro Edition/My Number One	European Border Breaker

== Eurovision Song Contest ==
The Eurovision Song Contest is an annual competition held among active member countries of the EBU. The contest, which has been broadcast every year since its debut in 1956, is one of the longest-running television programs and most watched in the world. In 2001, she participated as a member of Antique. In 2005, she won Eurovision alone.

Year	Nominated work	Result	Place
2001	"Die For You"	3/23	3rd Place
2005	"My Number One"	Won	1st Place

== Congratulations (Eurovision) ==
Congratulations: 50 Years of the Eurovision Song Contest was a television program organized by the EBU to commemorate the Eurovision Song Contest's fiftieth anniversary and to determine the Contest's most popular entrant of its fifty years. It took place at Forum Copenhagen on 22 October 2005. The year later in a similar ceremony at the Feel The Legend show held in Athens in May 2006 before the Eurovision, the song fell to the number 5 spot of all-time favorites.

Year	Nominated work	Result	Place
2005	"My Number One"	Nominated	4th Place

== MAD Video Music Awards ==
The MAD Video Music Awards are held annually by the MAD TV and are currently the only mainstream music award in Greece. They are considered the main music awards for Greece, although not affiliated officially with the music industry. Paparizou has won 36 awards from 69 nominations, becoming the most awarded artist of the VMA's.

Year	Nominated work	Award	Result
2004	"Anapandites Kliseis"	Best Dance Video	Won
2004	"Anapandites Kliseis"	Best New Artist	Nominated
2004	"Alli Mia Fora(Antique (duo))"	Best Outfit in a Video	Nominated
2005	"Katse Kala"	Best Video by a Female Artist	Won
2005	"Treli Kardia" (Giorgos Gavalos)	Best Director	Won
2005	"Katse Kala"	Best Dance Video	Nominated
2005	"Katse Kala"	Most Played Artist	Nominated
2005	"Antithesis"	Best Outfit in a Video	Nominated
2005	"Katse Kala"	Most Sexy Appearance in a Video	Nominated
2006	"Το Fos stin Psyhi/The Light in Our Soul"	Best Pop Video	Won
2006	"My Number One"	Best Video by a Female Artist	Won
2006	"My Number One"	Best Dance Video	Nominated
2006	"Mambo!"	Most Played Artist	Won
2007	"Gigolo"	Best Video by a Female Artist	Won
2007	"Αn Eihes Erthei Pio Noris"	Best Outfit in a Video	Won
2007	"Gigolo"	Best Pop Video	Nominated
2007	"Gigolo"	Video of the Year	Nominated
2007	"Iparhi logos"	Most Played Artist	Nominated
2008	"To Fili Tis Zois"	Best Pop Video	Won
2008	"To Fili Tis Zois"	Sexiest Artist	Nominated
2008	"Zileia Monaksia" Feat. Nikos Aliagas"	Best Duet	Nominated
2008	"To Fili Tis Zois"	Most Played Female Artist	Nominated
2008	"Mazi Sou"	Most Played Artist of the Year	Won
2008	"To Fili Tis Zois"	Video of the Year	Nominated
2009	"Pirotehnimata"	Best Pop Video	Won
2009	"I Kardia Sou Petra"	Best Female Artist of the Year	Won
2009	"Porta Gia Ton Ourano"	Artist of The Year	Nominated
2009	"Pirotehnimata"	Video of the Year	Won
2009	"Pirotehnimata"	Sexiest Appearance in a Video	Nominated
2010	"Tha 'Mai Allios"	Best Pop Video	Nominated
2010	"An Isouna Agapi"	Best Female Artist of the Year	Nominated
2010	"An Isouna Agapi"	Artist Of The Year	Nominated
2010	"Tha 'Mai Allios"	Video of the Year	Won
2010	"An Isouna Agapi"	Sexiest Appearance in a Video	Won
2011	"Psahno Tin Alithia"	Best Pop Video	Nominated
2011	"Baby It's Over"	Best Female Artist of the Year	Won
2011	"Baby It's Over"	Artist of the Year	Nominated
2011	"Baby It's Over"	Fashion Icon	Won
2012	"Mr. Perfect"	Best Pop Video	Nominated
2012	"Baby It's Over"	Track of the Year	Won
2012	Herself	Best Female Artist of the Year	Won
2012	"Mr. Perfect"	Artist of the Year	Nominated
2013	"All The Time"	Best Dance Video	Won
2013	"All The Time"	Best Duet-Collaboration	Won
2013	"All The Time"	Video Clip Of The Year	Nominated
2013	Herself	Best Female Artist	Won
2013	"All The Time"	Top50 Track Of The Year by Mediainspector	Nominated
2013	"Mesa Sou (MAD VMA 2008)"	Best Act MAD VMA 10 Years	N/A|-
2014	Herself	Female Artist	Nominated
2014	"De Thelo Allon Iroa"	Best Pop Video	Nominated
2015	"Stin Akri Tou Kosmou feat. Stavento"	Best Urban Video Clip	Won
2015	"Stin Akri Tou Kosmou feat. Stavento"	Best Duet	Nominated
2015	Herself	Best Female Modern	Nominated
2016	Herself	Best Female Modern	Won
2016	"Love Till It's Over" feat. HouseTwins	Best Dance Video	Nominated
2016	"Misi Kardia"	Best Pop Video	Nominated
2017	Herself	Best Female Modern	Won
2017	"Fiesta"	Best Dance Video	Nominated
2017	"Fiesta"	Song Of The Year	Nominated
2017	"Fiesta"	Video Of The Year	Nominated
2017	Herself	Supefans Of The Year	Nominated
2018	Herself	Best Female Adult	Won
2018	"An Me Dis Na Kleo" ft Rammos	Best Duo	Won
2018	"An Me Dis Na Kleo" ft Rammos	Song Of The Year	Nominated
2018	"An Me Dis Na Kleo" ft Rammos	Video Of The Year	Nominated
2019	Herself	Best Female Adult	Won
2020	Herself	Best Female Adult	Won
2020	"Etsi Ine I Fasi" ft Rouvas	Best Duo	Nominated
2020	Askopa Xenihtia	Song Of The Year	Nominated
2020	Herself	Best Female Singer - Adult	Won
2021	Se Xeno Soma	Best Video Ballad	Nominated
2021	Deja Vu	Best Video Pop	Nominated
2021	Deja Vu	Best Duet ft Marseaux	Nominated
2021	Deja Vu	Best Video Of The Year	Nominated
2021		Best Female Singer - Adult	Won
2022		Best Female Singer - Adult	Won
2022	"Gia Pia Agapi"	Best Video - Ballad	Won
2023		Best Female Singer - Adult/Laiko	Won
2023	"Katse Kala"	Best Duet ft Marseaux and Joanne	Won
2023	"Fevgo"	Best Video - Ballad	Nominated
2024		Artist- Pop	Nominated
2024	"Den Mou Ta Leei Kala"	Best Video Pop	Nominated
2024		Mad Icon	Won
2025	"Update"	Best Pop Video	Nominated

== MAD Music Awards Cyprus by Cyta/Vodafone ==
For the first in Cyprus. The show will be held at the end of October

Year	Nominated work	Award	Result
2015	"Otan Aggeli Klene"	"Best Female Artist Of The Year"	Nominated

== Melodifestivalen ==
Helena appeared as a guest star in the Melodifestivalen in 2006, 2012. Two years after her last appearance in the show, Helena came back as a contestant for the first time in the contest with her "Survivor". In the grand final she took the 4th place.

Year	Nominated work	Result	Place
2014	Survivor	Nominated	4th place

== MTV Europe Music Awards ==
Year	Award	Result	Place
2009	Best Greek Act	Won	1st
2009	Best European Act	Nominated	6th

== OGAE Song Contest ==
OGAE, is the international fan club of the Eurovision Song Contest. It has branches in 37 European countries. Every year, the organisation puts together four non-profit competitions (Song Contest, Second Chance Contest, Video Contest and Homecomposed Song Contest). The OGAE Song Contest is an audio event in which all OGAE national clubs can enter with an original song released in the previous 12 months in their countries and sang in one of the country's official language. Paparizou was the winner of the 21st OGAE in 2006. After Paparizou's performance on Eurovision 2006 with the song Mambo!, Terry Wogan quoted: "She is just showing she could win it again this year if she’d wanted to"

Year	Nominated work	Result	Place
2006	"Mambo!"	Won	1st Place
2007	"Mazi Sou"	Nominated	3rd Place
2013	"Ena Lepto"	Nominated	11th Place

== OGAE Second Chance Contest ==
OGAE Second Chance Contest organised between members of the international Eurovision Song Contest fan club OGAE to select the best song not to make it to the Eurovision Song Contest through their national finals. In 2005, Helena win in the Greek national final with her song "My Number One", but her songs "OK" and "Let's Get Wild" took the 2nd and 3rd place, respectively. The OGAE of Greece decided the song "Let's Get Wild" to take part in "OGAE Second Chance Contest" and that song took the 4th place. Also, 9 years after her appearance in the contest, Helena was contestant in the Swedish national final with the song "Survivor" and she took the 4th place. The OGAE of Sweden decided that song to take part in the "OGAE Second Chance Contest". Finally, she won in the "OGAE Second Chance Contest" with 259 points.

Year	Nominated work	Country	Result	Place
2005	"Let's Get Wild"	Greece	Nominated	4th Place
2014	"Survivor"	Sweden	Won	1st Place

== OGAE Video Contest ==
OGAE Video Contest organised between members of the international Eurovision Song Contest fan club OGAE to select the best video from artists who competed in the Eurovision Song Contest. In 2015, Helena was nominated with her latest music video and single in Greece Otan Aggeli Klene. Finally, in January 2016 results were announced and she reached 5th place in the "OGAE Video Contest" with 73 points.

Year	Nominated work	Country	Result	Place
2015	"Otan Aggeli Klene"	Greece	Nominated	5th Place

== Women of the Year Awards ==
The Women of the Year Awards are held annually from 2003 by the Greek Life & Style Magazine. Paparizou has nominated for two awards.

Year	Nominated work	Award
2005	International Greek of the Year	Nominated
2006	Pop-Modern Laika Artist of the Year	Nominated
