= Greatest Hits & More (Helena Paparizou album) =

2011 compilation album by Elena Paparizou

Compilation album by Helena Paparizou
- Released: 23 May 2011
- Recorded: 2003–2011
- Genre: Laïko-pop, electronic
- Length: 185:52
- Label: Sony/RCA

Helena Paparizou chronology
Giro Apo T' Oneiro (2010)	Greatest Hits & More (2011)	Ti Ora Tha Vgoume? (2013)

Singles from Greatest Hits & More
- 1. "Baby It's Over" Released: 2 February 2011

Greatest Hits & More is the first compilation album by Greek-Swedish recording artist Helena Paparizou, released in Greece and Cyprus by Sony Music Greece/RCA on 23 May 2011, although it became available through some retailers as early as 20 May. The album is a three disc set containing 52 tracks since the start of her solo career (since 2003), spanning five studio albums: Protereotita (2004), Iparhi Logos (2006), The Game of Love (2006), Vrisko To Logo Na Zo (2008), and Giro Apo T' Oneiro (2010). Although marketed as a greatest hits album, it contains all of Paparizou's regularly released singles, including some of their English versions, rather than a selective collection of the best performing songs, as well as several promotional singles and album tracks that have never officially been released to radios. The first disc is mostly a collection of her regularly released solo singles; the second is split into three sections: "International" containing English-language songs, "B-Sides" containing mostly album tracks (none of which are b-sides), and "Covers"; the third is split into "New Songs" featuring "Baby It's Over" and "Love Me Crazy", "Bonus Tracks" with four remixes of the former and a Greek-language version of the latter entitled "Oti Niotho Den Allazei", and finally "Duets", showcasing her work as a featured artist.

The album debuted at number two on the Greek Albums Chart and has so far spent six weeks on the chart. The album's lead single, "Baby It's Over", debuted at number one on the Billboard Greek Digital Songs Chart and eventually topped the Greek Airplay Chart for nine weeks. The album's second single is "O,ti Niotho Den Allazei" ("Love Me Crazy"). Paparizou also promoted the album with performances at the first MADWalk and The X Factor.

== Background ==
Greatest Hits & More is Paparizou's first compilation album release. It will be a triple album, containing her hit singles as well as two new English-language tracks "Baby It's Over", "Love Me Crazy", as well as a Greek-language version of the former entitled "O,ti Niotho Den Allazi" (What i feel doesn't change). There will also be a DVD containing a collection of her music videos as well as backstage videos and a photo gallery. The release date for the album was originally announced to be in late March but it was then delayed to late April. Teasers of the lyrics of the other two songs have also been released: "There's so many dreams unlighted swirling in the sky above absent minds. Open up to be enlightened there's a miracle for everyone to find" (from "Love Me Crazy").

Paparizou began her solo career in 2003 after signing with Sony Music Entertainment Greece and has since released five studio albums in Greece and Cyprus: Protereotita (2004), the double album Iparhi Logos (2006), The Game of Love (2006), Vrisko To Logo Na Zo (2008), and Giro Apo T' Oneiro (2010). She has also released the extended plays Mambo! (2005), and Fos (2007) and has participated in four soundtracks: I Barbie Stis Dodeka Vasilopoules (2006), Mazi Sou (2007), To Fili Tis Zois, and the Swedish Arn Riket (2008). All of her Greek-language studio albums have at least one reissue. Abroad, she has released the albums My Number One (2005) and The Game of Love (2006) through her Swedish label Bonnier Amigo Music. Her chart-topping singles (either physical, radio, or digital format) include "Anapandites Kliseis", "My Number One" (also in Sweden), "Mambo!", "Gigolo", "Teardrops", "Mazi Sou", "To Fili Tis Zois", "Porta Gia Ton Ourano", "I Kardia Sou Petra", and "Baby It's Over" in Greece, as well as "Heroes" in Sweden.

== Singles ==
"Baby It's Over" was confirmed to be the first single from the compilation. It is a dance song and was released to radios on 2 February 2011 and further released as a digital download on 18 February 2011. It debuted at number one on the Billboard Greek Digital Songs Chart, making it her fourth number-one hit on that chart and first single to top any Greek chart in three years, since "I Kardia Sou Petra". It has peaked at number 1 on the Greek Airplay Chart and is the first-highest charting domestic single. The music video was filmed in late March and is directed by Konstantinos Rigos, who had previously directed "An Isouna Agapi" for Paparizou. MAD TV has reported that "Love Me Crazy" will be the album's second single. Its Greek-language counterpart, "O,ti Niotho Den Allazei" was distributed to Greek radios on 17 May 2011.

== Promotion ==
Paparizou performed as one of eight main acts at the first MADWalk, a charity project equivalent to the international Fashion Rocks, sponsored by Vodafone Greece, with proceeds going to ELPIDA, a charity of children with cancer. She represented fashion designer Apostolos Mitropoulos and performed a cover of En Vogue's "Free Your Mind" followed by the premiere of her new single "Baby It's Over". She then appeared as the guest act at the Greek The X Factor 3 finale on 11 February 2011, where she again performed song as well as past songs such as "An Isouna Agapi", "Tha 'Mai Allios", "Porta Gia Ton Ourano", "Girna Me Sto Htes (All Around the Dream Version)", "Fisika Mazi", and "Psahno Tin Alitheia". Both performances were done using playback.

== Commercial performance ==
Greatest Hits & More debuted at number two on the IFPI Greece Top 75 Combined Repertoire Albums Chart, behind Lady Gaga's Born This Way, making it the best-selling domestic album of that week. It stayed there for a further three weeks until dropping down to number three in its fifth week, trading places with Sakis Rouvas' Parafora. It has so far spent thirteen weeks on the chart and, with the exception of Giro Apo T' Oneiro (2010) whose chart positions are unknown due to IFPI Greece shutting down operations at the time, it is her first album to not top the Greek sales charts.

== Track listing ==
Disc one
No.	Title	Lyrics	Music	Original album	Length
1.	"Pirotehnimata" (Πυροτεχνήματα; Fireworks)	Yiannis Doxas	Giorgos Sabanis	Vrisko To Logo Na Zo	4:13
2.	"Mambo! (Greek version)"	Yiannis Doxas	Alex Papaconstantinou, Marcus Englof	Protereotita: Euro Edition + Mambo!/Iparhi Logos	3:05
3.	"To Fili Tis Zois" (Το Φιλί Της Ζωής; Kiss Of Life)	Yiannis Doxas	Giorgos Sabanis	To Fili Tis Zois/Vrisko To Logo Na Zo	3:38
4.	"Mazi Sou" (Μαζί Σου; With You)	Eleana Vrahali	Giannis Christodoulopoulos	Mazi Sou/Iparhi Logos: Platinum Edition	3:22
5.	"An Eihes Erthei Pio Noris" (Αν είχες έρθει πιο νωρίς; If you had come earlier)	Antonis Pappas	Nikos Orfanos	Iparhi Logos	4:05
6.	"Iparhi Logos" (Υπάρχει Λόγος; There is a reason)	Zoe Grypari	Efthivoulos	Iparhi Logos	4:21
7.	"Anapandites Kliseis" (Αναπάντητες Κλήσεις; Missed Calls)	Vangelis Konstantinidis	Christos Dantis	Protereotita	4:07
8.	"Porta Gia Ton Ourano" (Πόρτα για τον ουρανό; Door to the sky)	Eleana Vrahali	Per Liden, Toni Mavridis, Niclas Olausson	Vrisko To Logo Na Zo	2:57
9.	"An Isouna Agapi" (Αν ήσουνα αγάπη; If you were love)	Niki Papatheohari	Giorgos Sabanis	Giro Apo T' Oneiro	4:17
10.	"To Fos Sti Psyhi" (Το φως στην ψυχή; The light in our soul)	Kostas Bigalis	Kostas Bigalis	Protereotita: Euro Edition/My Number One	2:58
11.	"Psahno Tin Alitheia" (Ψάχνω την αλήθεια; I search for the truth)	Yiannis Doxas	Per Liden, Toni Mavridis, Niclas Olausson	Giro Apo T' Oneiro	3:09
12.	"I Kardia Sou Petra" (Η καρδιά σου πέτρα; Your heart like stone)	Yiannis Doxas	Giorgos Sabanis	Vrisko To Logo Na Zo	4:30
13.	"The Game of Love (Greeklish version)"	Yiannis Doxas, Mack	Alex Papaconstantinou, Marcus Englof	Iparhi Logos	3:09
14.	"Gigolo (Greek version)"	Nikos Gritsis	Alex Papaconstantinou, Marcus Englof	Iparhi Logos	3:23
15.	"Panta Se Perimena (Idaniko Fili)" (Πάντα σε περίμενα (Ιδανικό Φιλί); Ι've always been waiting for you (Ideal Kiss))	Natalia Germanou	Toni Mavridis	Protereotita: Euro Edition + Mambo!/Iparhi Logos	3:48
16.	"Tha 'Mai Allios" (Θα 'μαι αλλιώς; I'll be different)	Eleana Vrahali	Per Lidén, Robin Fredriksson, Mattias Larsson	Giro Apo T' Oneiro	3:05
17.	"Katse Kala" (Κάτσε Καλά; Behave Yourself)	Nikki P., Toni Mavridis	Alex Papaconstantinou, Peter Cartiers	Protereotita	4:24
18.	"Treli Kardia" (Τρελή Καρδιά; Crazy Heart)	Despina Mavridou, Helena Paparizou	Alex Papaconstantinou, Marcus Englof	Protereotita	3:29
19.	"Antithesis" (Αντιθέσεις; Oppositions)	Ilias Filippou	Energee	Protereotita	4:21
20.	"Girna Me Sto Htes (Around the Dream Version)" (Γύρνα με στο χτες; Take me back to yesterday)	Eleana Vrahali, Yiannis Doxas	Giorgos Sabanis	Greatest Hits & More	3:28

Disc two – international
No.	Title	Lyrics	Music	Original album	Length
1.	"My Number One" (Greek Entry in The Eurovision Song Contest 2005)	Natalia Germanou, Christos Dantis	Christos Dantis	Protereotita: Euro Edition/My Number One	2:59
2.	"You Set My Heart On Fire"	Biddu	Biddu	Iparhi Logos/The Game of Love	3:12
3.	"Heroes" (The official theme song of the 2006 European Championships in Athletics)	N. Molinder, J. Persson & P. Ankarberg	N. Molinder, J. Persson & P. Ankarberg	The Game of Love	2:55
4.	"Teardrops"	Helena Paparizou	Toni Mavridis, Niclas Olausson	The Game of Love	3:49
5.	"Mambo! (English version)"	Mack	Alex Papaconstantinou, Marcus Englof	Protereotita: Euro Edition + Mambo!/The Game of Love	3:04
6.	"Gigolo (English version)"	Mack	Alex Papaconstantinou, Marcus Englof	The Game of Love	3:22

B-sides
No.	Title	Lyrics	Music	Original album	Length
7.	"Na Ksypnao Kai Na 'Mai Mazi Sou" (Να ξυπνάω και να μαι μαζί σου; To wake up and be with you)	Eleana Vrahali	Giannis Christodoulopoulos	Mazi Sou	4:01
8.	"Stin Kardia Mou Mono Thlipsi" (Στην καρδιά μου μόνο θλίψη; Sorrow in my heart)	Grigoris Petrakos	Grigoris Petrakos	Protereotita	3:01
9.	"Pou Pige Tosi Agapi (Summer Moonlight mix)" (Που πήγε τόση αγάπη; Where did so much love go)	Pegasus	Pegasus	Iparhi Logos: Platinum Edition	3:58
10.	"Paradigmatos Hari" (Παραδείγματος Χάρη; For Example)	Andreas Bonatsos	Andreas Bonatsos	Iparhi Logos	3:53
11.	"Eisai I Foni" (Είσαι η φωνή; You are the voice)	Antonis Pappas	Per Liden, Toni Mavridis, Niclas Olausson	Vrisko To Logo Na Zo	3:21
12.	"Den Allazo" (Δεν Αλλάζω; I am not changing)	Vaya Kalantzi	Dimitris Kontopoulos	Giro Apo T' Oneiro	3:23
13.	"Taxidi Gia To Agnosto" (Ταξίδι για το άγνωστο; Trip to the unknown)	Vangelis Constantinidis	Alex Papaconstantinou	Protereotita	4:23
14.	"(Ehis Kero Na Mou Feris) Louloudia" ((Έχεις καιρό να μου φέρεις) Λουλούδια; (It's been a long time since you brought me) Flowers)	Yiannis Doxas	Dimitris Kontopoulos	Protereotita	4:20

Covers
No.	Title	Lyrics	Music	Original album	Length
15.	"An Esy M'agapas (Pour que tu m'aimes encore)" (Αν εσύ μ'αγαπάς; If you love me)	Jean-Jacques Goldman	Jean-Jacques Goldman	Iparhi Logos: Platinum Edition	4:14
16.	"Min Fevgeis" (Μη Φεύγεις; Don't leave)	Takis Parisinos	Lakis Karnezis	Iparhi Logos: Platinum Edition	4:11
17.	"Oti Axizi Ine I Stigmes (Le Bonheur)" (Ό,τι αξίζει είναι οι στιγμές; What worths is the moments)	Eleana Vrahali	Manos Hadjidakis	Iparhi Logos/The Game of Love	3:38
18.	"Fos" (Φως; Light)	Anna Ioannidou	Roth Arnie	I Barbie Stis 12 Vasilopoules/Iparhi Logos: Platinum Edition	3:08
19.	"I Agapi Sou De Menei Pia Edo (Aşkın Açamadığı Kapı)" (Η Αγάπη Σου Δε Μένει Πια Εδώ; Your love does not stay here anymore)	Eleni Gianatsoulia	E. Uner	Protereotita: Euro Edition + Mambo!/Iparhi Logos: Platinum Edition	3:51
20.	"Just Walk Away (live)"	Albert Hammond	Marti Sharon	Iparhi Logos	3:42

Disc three – new songs
No.	Title	Lyrics	Music	Length
1.	"Baby It's Over"	Tamminen, Ahlstedt, Sörvaag	Tamminen, Ahlstedt, Sörvaag	3:53
2.	"Love Me Crazy"	Tamminen, Ahlstedt, Senström	Tamminen, Ahlstedt, Senström	4:11

Bonus tracks
No.	Title	Lyrics	Music	Length
3.	"O,ti Niotho Den Allazi (Love Me Crazy)" (Ό,τι νιώθω δεν αλλάζει; What i feel does not change)	Nikos Moraitis	Tamminen, Ahlstedt, Senström	4:11
4.	"Baby It's Over(The Thin Red Men radio mix)"	Tamminen, Ahlstedt, Sörvaag	Tamminen, Ahlstedt, Sörvaag	3:24
5.	"Baby It's Over(The Thin Red Men club mix)"	Tamminen, Ahlstedt, Sörvaag	Tamminen, Ahlstedt, Sörvaag	5:36
6.	"Baby It's Over(Helena Paparizou VS Supermarkets radio mix)"	Tamminen, Ahlstedt, Sörvaag	Tamminen, Ahlstedt, Sörvaag	3:27
7.	"Baby It's Over(Helena Paparizou VS Supermarkets club mix)"	Tamminen, Ahlstedt, Sörvaag	Tamminen, Ahlstedt, Sörvaag	3:57

Duets
No.	Title	Lyrics	Music	Original album	Length
8.	"Enredao (duet with Albert Hammond)"	Albert Hammond	Albert Hammond	Legend	3:34
9.	"I Zilia Monaxia (L'Envie D'Aimer) (Nikos Aliagas feat. Helena Paparizou)"	Yiannis Doxas	Obispo Pascal	Rendez-Vous	4:44
10.	"Mesa Sou (VMA Version) (Stavento feat. Helena Paparizou)"	Stavento	Stavento	Simera To Giortazo/Restarded	3:42
11.	"Fysika Mazi (Together Forever) (Playmen feat. Onirama and Helena Paparizou)"	Thodoris Maradinis	Playmen	Greatest Hits & More	3:29
12.	"Papeles Mojados (duet with Chambao)"	Yiannis Doxas	María del Mar Rodríguez Carnero	Vrisko To Logo Na Zo	3:50

== Charts ==
Chart	Provider	Peak position
Greek Albums Chart	IFPI	2
