= Giro apo t'oneiro =

Giro apo t'oneiro Γύρω από τ' όνειρο

Studio album by Helena Paparizou
- Released: 29 March 2010
- Recorded: October 2009–February 2010
- Genres: Laïko-pop; pop rock; electronica
- Length: 47:28
- Languages: Greek, English
- Label: Sony Greece/RCA
- Producers: Giannis Doxas (exec.), Don-K (Toni Mavridis, Niclas Olausson; also exec.), Leonidas "Freakchild" Chantzaras, Dimitris Kontopoulos, Giorgos Sabanis, Hawksley Workman

Helena Paparizou chronology
Vrisko To Logo Na Zo (2008)	Giro apo t'oneiro Γύρω από τ' όνειρο (2010)	Greatest Hits & More (2011)

Singles from Giro apo t'oneiro
- 1. "Tha 'Mai Allios" Released: 10 April 2009; 2. "An Isouna Agapi" Released: 24 February 2010; 3. "Psahno Tin Alitheia" Released: 20 May 2010; 4. "Girna Me Sto Htes (All Around the Dream Remix)" Released: 7 October 2010

Giro apo t'oneiro (Greek: Γύρω από τ' όνειρο [ˈʝiro aˈpo ˈtoniro]; English: "Around the dream") is the fourth Greek-language studio album and sixth studio album overall by Greek singer Helena Paparizou, released on 29 March 2010 by Sony Music Greece. The album, which was certified platinum in Greece for 12,000 shipments, was released in both standard and deluxe editions, with the deluxe edition featuring a live DVD. Distributed initially as a covermount with the Greek newspaper Real News on 28 March, it sold 140,000 copies through both releases, making it the most widely distributed release of Paparizou's career. Its singles performed moderately well compared to her previous albums, with "Tha 'Mai Allios", "An Isouna Agapi", and "Girna Me Sto Htes" managing to reach the top 10 of the domestic charts.

To promote the album Paparizou performed on several television programs and embarked on a joint national tour with the band Onirama called Fisika Mazi. She also performed a revue show at Diogenis Studio, supporting Antonis Remos.

Dedicated to Paparizou's father who died in 2008, the album's production team and musical direction were fairly similar to that of Vrisko To Logo Na Zo (2008). However, while the influence of pop-rock sounds continued, the album is much more rooted in pop production than its predecessor, re-embracing Paparizou's previous dance-pop and pop-folk styles. Giro apo t'oneiro received mixed reviews from professional music critics and the album marked Paparizou's last studio release with Sony Music Greece.

== Conception ==
=== Background ===
Paparizou initially released the album Vrisko To Logo Na Zo in June 2008. While Vrisko To Logo Na Zo was a commercial success, generating three top ten singles, being certified Platinum by IFPI Greece for shipments of 30 thousand copies and becoming the second best-selling album of 2008 in both domestic and foreign domains, it sold less than its three predecessors. The album was later reissued as The Deluxe Edition in December 2008, containing photographic material and a video release of her To Party Arhizei tour, there were further plans to release the album once again as a special edition with new material, including the digital single "Tha 'Mai Allios" (I will be different) released in April 2009. Additional material was to include many of her live covers from the 2009 MAD Secret Concert, six new duets, and a duet/cover of "Friends" with the Italian band Silky Sunday called "Pothi (Siga Psithirista)" (desires [whispered softly]). The reissue would have been set for release in the fall, however, Paparizou changed her mind, opting to use "Tha 'Mai Allios" as well as newly recorded material for a full-length with studio album in early 2010.

In 2008, Paparizou had announced that her second English-language album was in the works, with a release slated for 2009, making it the follow-up to Vrisko To Logo Na Zo (2008) and the English follow-up to The Game of Love (2006) and that once it was released she would travel abroad for a period of time. However, this did not materialize mostly due to her father's sudden death, explaining that her priorities had shifted; Paparizou expressed that "When you lose a parent, you are forced to mature, you test your endurance. After a busy 2008–2009 schedule, Paparizou announced that instead of performing for the winter season she would take a break from the industry in order to support her mother who needed her, something she did not have the opportunity to do in the past year due to work obligations, as well as take time to record her new material.

=== Recording and production ===
Vrisko To Logo Na Zo was Paparizou's first album to contain all new material since her debut album. She made the first announcement of the new album in an interview with Down Town Magazine in October 2009, and at that time three of the tracks on the album had been completed. She stated that she and her team had gathered a lot of material and that she was "very pleased" with the outcome thus far, announcing two of the collaborators: singer-songwriter Giorgos Sabanis and lyricist Giannis Doxas, who was also Paparizou's A&R; both musicians were on the previous album. Doxas was confirmed as the lyricist of the tracks "Girna Me Sto Htes" (Bring me back to yesterday) and "Thalassa" (Sea), while Sabanis was announced as the composer of all four confirmed tracks.

Like her album, Giro apo t'oneiro was recorded partially in Sweden, where she spent her winter holidays, and at her professional home studio in the suburb of Glyfada, near Athens. As she had first done with Vrisko To Logo Na Zo, Paparizou contributed musically to the album, having written the music to one of the songs. Paparizou's fiancé at the time and manager Toni Mavridis composed tracks for the album, as he had done for all of her solo albums, while Dimitris Kontopoulos' inclusion was described as a "surprise," being the first time he had worked with Paparizou since her debut album. Lyricists on the album included Niki Papatheohari who wrote the lyrics to the lead single "An Isouna Agapi", Eleanna Vrahali who had written the lyrics to "Porta Gia Ton Ourano" on the previous album, and Valia Kalantzi. Although Paparizou previously recorded "Papeles Mojados" (wet papers) with Spanish flamenco-electronic group Chambao for her fourth album, that track was re-recorded with vocals from Paparizou rather than an actual collaboration between the two artists, making "Thalassa" her first collaboration to be featured on an album during her solo career and second collaboration overall after "I Zileia Monaxia", a cover of "L'envie d'aimer" with TV presenter Nikos Aliagas, released on his album project Rendez-Vous (2007). In an interview with Proini Meleti (Πρωινή Μελέτη) on Star Channel after a promotional event by Dromos FM, Paparizou stated that the album was dedicated to her late father. She further stated that the album has a more mature feeling to it, as she has matured since her last album, while the producers of the album are DON-K once again.

=== Artwork ===
In mid-February Paparizou completed her photo shoot for the album at the studio of Giorgos Metsoutis. The artwork concept was of simplistic scenery, designed by photographer Dimitris Skoulos, with Paparizou posing in front of a white background, wearing a white, oversize blouse with her legs bare. Paparizou once again collaborated with her longtime image team, with Al Giga responsible for the wardrobe styling, Giannis Marketakis as the make-up artist, and Christos Kallaniotis as her hairstylist.

== Composition and themes ==
While the album has many of the same producers from Vrisko To Logo Na Zo and likewise will include some similar musical styles first experimented within that album, it will be more reminiscent of Iparhi Logos, focusing on a blend of pop, rock, and ethnic genres. Produced at a time when Paparizou was still grieving over her father's death, the album contains content that reflects her feelings about the experience; One of the songs is a dedication to her late father, which was one of the first tracks produced for the album. Amongst the other tracks on the album will be "An Isouna Agapi", an uptempo ballad, an ethnic dance track called "Thalassa", which will be a vocal duet with Giorgos Sabanis, as well as "San Kai Sena" Paparizou also penned a song on the album titled "Filarakia" (Friends), with lyrics by Eleana Vrahali, as a dedication to her fans.

== Release and promotion ==
In October 2009, Paparizou had stated that the album would be ready for release provisionally either in February or March 2010. On 23 February, Sony Music Greece announced a release date of 15 March for Greece and Cyprus. However, Paparizou later announced via her Twitter that the album release date had been pushed back until 29 March 2010.

Paparizou posted a message via her Twitter account thanking her fans for their support and promising to use the social networking website more often to update fans on her upcoming events. Paparizou furthered her collaboration with soft drink company Ivi (a PepsiCo brand) and for the first time it is the main sponsor of her album, although it had previously sponsored her tour. In promotion of its "Vges Sto Gyali" (Get to the glass) slogan, Ivi held an online contest with the winners being selected to appear in Paparizou's newest music video for the brand.

Dromos 89.8 FM became the main radio sponsor of the album and announced a contest for its audience coinciding with the lead single's release date: 50 winners would get the chance to meet Paparizou at a then undisclosed location (Studio Sierra) and preview the new songs in a live concert before it is released on 28 February 2010 at 7:00 pm. The concert which was directed by Giorgos Gavalos, was recorded and included as a bonus DVD on the deluxe edition of the album. Paparizou performed a remix of "An Isouna Agapi" at the Madame Figaro Women of the Year Awards 2010 in Cyprus and also stated that she will most likely perform at the MAD Video Music Awards in June 2010. She also performed as the main act at the Athens Pride 2010 for LGBT people during the artistic portion of the festival.

=== Tour ===
Paparizou's positive experience on To Party Arhizei (as seen here performing in Lamia on 29 August 2008) inspired her to launch another tour in 2010.

As Paparizou was highly content with the experience of her first major tour in 2008, she planned to embark on another tour to many Greek cities over the summer of 2010 in promotion of Giro apo t'oneiro. In a radio interview on Kosmoradio 95,1 on February 25, 2010, Paparizou stated that Onirama would accompany her on her summer tour, and that they would kick off the tour on 30 June 2010 in Athens.

=== Singles ===
"Tha 'Mai Allios" was released in April 2009 as a digital single in promotion of Ivi's "Fersou fisika" (act natural) campaign, where Paparizou was chosen as the company's "sweet bird". The single —originally planned to be released on the reissue of Vrisko To Logo Na Zo— was subsequently included on this album following the decision to release a new album instead. The song peaked at number two on the Greek Digital Singles Chart, as well as becoming another top five radio single in both Greece and Cyprus.

The second single from the album is "An Isouna Agapi", an uptempo ballad composed by Giorgos Sabanis with lyrics by Niki Papatheohari. Originally, the song was scheduled to be released on 25 February, however, it instead premiered exclusively on Dromos FM 89.8 one day earlier.

The third single was "Psahno Tin Alitheia". The music video was filmed on 8 April 2010 and includes the winners from Ivi's contest.

The fourth single off the album is a remix of "Girna Me Sto Htes" by DonK. The remix was officially released on October 7, 2010.

== Reception ==
=== Commercial performance ===
On 28 March 2010, the album was packaged with the nationwide newspaper Real News. 11 days following its release, it was announced that the album had achieved total shipments of 140 thousand units physically and via newspaper. However, newspaper shipments are not taken into consideration by IFPI for certifications. In a radio interview in August 2010, Paparizou stated that the album had sold enough physical copies to be certified Platinum by IFPI. On 6 November 2010, Paparizou was awarded platinum certification, with shipments of at least 12,000 units, for Giro apo t'oneiro by IFPI Greece at the grand opening of the new Metropolis music store at The Mall Athens.

=== Critical response ===
Professional ratings
Review scores
Source	Rating
Avopolis	2.5/5 stars
Music Corner	(mixed)
miss.gr	3.5/5 stars

Critical reaction to Giro apo t'oneiro was generally mixed. Makis Kalamaris of Avopolis gave the album two and a half out of five stars, ranking as "average" in their system, the same ranking he had given to her previous album. In addition to admiring Sabanis' compositions, Giannis Doxas' "decent to even interesting" lyrical content, the high point of the Silky Sunday collaboration, and Paparizou's international-level pop star transformation on "Dancing without Music" when comparing it to the rest of the album, he also praised the album's excellent production values and Paparizou's continuous ability to give life to the most boring tracks with her delivery. However, he criticized the boring and trivial contributions of Don-K and Dimitris Kontopoulos, and said that while the pop/rock songs on the album "may not hurt our ears" ("Tou Erota To Aima", "Stin Korifi Tou Kosmou", and "Oneiro") "or even sound pleasant sometimes" ("San Kai Sena", "Tha 'Mai Allios") they are not memorable "for even one moment" after they are over. As with Vrisko To Logo Na Zo, he maintained that Paparizou's rock elements were a promotional tactic due to the genre's current popularity, but stated he admired her desire for searching and reinvention and ability to make the crossover with professionalism; however, he concluded that this tactic had grown "tiring and predictable" and urged a full pop/dance return.

Katerina Hamilothori of Music Corner expressed that the album left a disappointing first impression and that none of the songs stand out as a hit single; however, she then stated that after hearing the material a couple of times the majority of the songs seemed pleasant, noting that they were of a higher class and quality compared to the singer's previous material. Paparizou had previously been criticized for trivial lyrics that never stray away from love clichés; however, Hamilothori also found that the lyrics are more well-worked and more attention was paid to them, while selecting "Tou Erota To Aima", "Psahno Tin Alitheia", and "Thalassa" as the album's best tracks. Despite her initial discontent regarding the album, Hamilotheri noted Paparizou's artistic development, concluding that "Whatever we say about Ms. "Number One", it is not enough. She always knows how to make a step forward and become better every year."

Konstantinos Bougas of Miss magazine also commended Paparizou for reinventing her style and offering "each time particularly carefully-crafted albums". "Perhaps Giro apo t'oneiro does not give us that feeling of absolute satisfaction, surely however it contains enough songs that make it by far surpass the mediocrity common in the Greek music industry", he summarized.

== Track listing ==
The album also contains a hidden song after the last song.

All editions
No.	Title	Lyrics	Music	Length
1.	"San kai 'sena" (Σαν και ΄σένα; Like you)	Eleana Vrahali	Giorgos Sabanis	3:48
2.	"An Isouna Agapi" (Αν ήσουνα αγάπη; If you were love)	Nikki Papatheohari	Giorogs Sabanis	4:17
3.	"Psahno Tin Alitheia" (Ψάχνω την αλήθεια; I search for the truth)	Giannis Doxas	Per Lidén, Niclas Olausson, Toni Marvidis	3:09
4.	"Girna Me Sto Htes" (Γύρνα με στο χτες; Bring me back to yesterday)	Giannis Doxas, Eleana Vrahali	Giorgos Sabanis	4:23
5.	"Tou erota to aima" (Του έρωτα το αίμα; The blood of love)	Eleana Vrahali	Sofi Lindblom, Matilda Ekevik, Niclas Olausson	3:31
6.	"Oneiro (Chemical)" (Όνειρο; Dream)	Giannis Doxas	Hawksley Workman, Per Eklund, Stefan Ekstedt, Magnus Sjölander	3:48
7.	"Filarakia" (Φιλαράκια; Friends)	Eleana Vrahali	Helena Paparizou	3:16
8.	"Stin korifi tou kosmou" (Στην κορυφή του κόσμου; On top of the world)	Giannis Doxas	Giorgos Sabanis	3:22
9.	"Thalassa (Feat. Giorgos Sabanis)" (Θάλασσα; Sea)	Giannis Doxas	Giorgos Sabanis, Niclas Olausson, Toni Mavridis	4:18
10.	"Den allazo" (Δεν αλλάζω; I don't change)	Vagia Kalantzi	Dimitris Kontopoulos	3:23
11.	"Siga, psithirista (Friend) [feat. Silky Sunday]" (Σιγά, ψιθυριστά; Softly, whispered)	Giannis Doxas	Silky Sunday, Mike Rubin, Snoux Poswa, Mark Roy Ströbel	3:37
12.	"Tha 'Mai Allios" (Θα 'μαι αλλιώς; Ι will be different)	Eleana Vrahali	Per Lidén, Robin Fredriksson, Mattias Larsson	3:05
Total length:				44:37

Hidden track (Standard retail and The Deluxe Edition)
No.	Title	Lyrics	Music	Length
13.	"Dancing Without Music"	Gosta Hulden	Leonidas "Freakchild" Chantzaras	3:31
Total length:				47:28

The Deluxe Edition (DVD)
No.	Title	Director	Length
1.	"Dromos FM Album Preview Performance"	Giorgos Gavalos
2.	"Backstage"	Giorgos Gavalos
3.	"Interviews"	Giorgos Gavalos

== Personnel ==
Credits adapted from liner notes:

- Giannis Doxas – A&R, executive producer
- Tom Coyne (Sterling Sound) – mastering
- Al Giga (effex+) – styling
- Mytro Gonou – artwork
- Antonis Glykos – artwork
- Don K – production, arrangement
- Christos Kallaniotis (Smile) – hairstyling
- Giannis Marketakis (effex+) – make-up
- Toni Mavridis – producer
- Elena Paparizou – vocals
- Giorgos Sabanis – producer, vocals
- Dimitris Skolos (effex+) – photography

== Release history ==
Region	Date	Format	Label	Version	Ref.
Greece	28 March 2010	CD	Sony Music/RCA	RealNews	
Greece	29 March 2010	CD	Sony Music/RCA	Deluxe	
Cyprus	29 March 2010	CD	Sony Music/RCA	Deluxe	
Various	29 March 2010	Digital download	Sony Music/RCA	Standard	
Bulgaria	5 July 2010	CD	Virginia Records	Standard	
