= Nikos Aliagas discography =

This page includes the discography of the Greek-French artist Nikos Aliagas.

== Albums ==
All the albums listed underneath were released and charted in Greece and Cyprus.

Year	Title	Chart positions		Greek certification and sales
Year	Title	GRE	CYP	Greek certification and sales
2004	Nikos Aliagas & Friends : Rendez-Vous: First studio album; Released: October 17, 2007; Formats: CD+DVD	1	1	Gold
		GRE	CYP	
	Number one albums	1	1	
	Top ten albums	1	1	

== Singles ==
(Not all singles were released on CD)

- 2007 - "Zileia Monaksia" feat. Helena Paparizou
- 2007 - "Mine Ki Allo (Ain't No Sunshine)"
- 2008 - "Xara Mou"

== Music videos ==
- 2007 - "Zileia Monaksia" feat. Helena Paparizou
- 2007 - "Mine Ki Allo (Ain't No Sunshine)"

== Video albums ==
- 2007 - Nikos Aliagas & Friends : Rendez-Vous
