= Otan Aggeli Klene =

2015 single by Elena Paparizou

"Otan Aggeli Klene (Angel)"

Single by Helena Paparizou

from the album Ouranio Toxo
- Released: 23 February 2015
- Recorded: 2015
- Genre: Power Ballad
- Length: 3:05
- Label: EMI Music Greece
- Songwriter(s): Amir Aly, Henrik Wikström, Bobby Ljunggren, Sharon Vaughn (English Lyrics), Yiannis Doxas (Greek Lyrics)
- Producer(s): Amir Aly, Henrik Wikström

Helena Paparizou singles chronology
"Don't Hold Back On Love" (2014)	"Otan Aggeli Klene (Angel)" (2015)	"Angel" (2015)

Helena Paparizou chronology
One Life	Otan Aggeli Klene

Singles from Otan Aggeli Klene
- 1. "Otan Aggeli Klene" Released: 2 March 2015

"Otan Aggeli Klene", an up-tempo ballad, is a Greek song by Helena Paparizou. It was exclusively impacted on some Greek radios on February 16 and officially released on February 23 as a digital single. The song was written by Amir Aly, Henrik Wikström, Bobby Ljunggren, Sharon Vaughn and the Greek lyrics are written by Yiannis Doxas, giving a special message about solidarity. This song serves as the lead single from her sixth Greek studio album "Ouranio Toxo" which was released on December 15, 2017.

The song features 10 titles of Paparizou's previous hit singles in Greece: I Kardia Sou Petra, Anapandites Klisis, Pirotehnimata, To Fos Sti Psyhi, Girna Me Sto Htes, To Fili Tis Zois, Iparhi Logos, Mazi Sou, Antithesis and Pou Pige Tosi Agapi

The English version "Angel" released in Sweden on April 24 by Capitol Music Group.

== Music video ==
The music video premiered on VEVO on March 3. The video was shot on February 24, 2015, in Athens and was directed by Sherif Francis.

== Track listing ==
01.Otan Aggeli Klene (Angel) – 03:05

02.Otan Aggeli Klene (Angel) (Singback Version) – 03:05

== Charts ==
Chart (2015)	Peak position
Greek Airplay Chart	3

== Release history ==
Region	Date	Label	Format
Greece	23 February 2015	EMI Music Greece	Digital, Radio
Sweden	24 April 2015	Capitol Music Group	Digital, Radio
