= Courtney Parker =

American singer and dancer

- Also known as: Courtney
- Born: July 7, 1985 (age 40); Oklahoma City, Oklahoma, United States
- Origin: Oklahoma City, Oklahoma, United States
- Genres: R&B; pop; dance
- Occupations: Singer; dancer
- Years active: 2010–present
- Label: Panik Records

Courtney Parker (born July 7, 1985 in Oklahoma City, Oklahoma) usually referred to simply as Courtney is an American singer and dancer that currently lives and works in Greece. She is currently signed to the Panik Records. She is known for her collaborations with Elena Paparizou, Playmen and HouseTwins at the songs "All the Time", "Breakin' Me Up", and "Rhythm Is A Dancer" respectively.

== Career ==
Before moving to Greece and starting her music career, Courtney was a dancer. Her love for dancing led her to teaching and choreographing for the last 11 years. She studied classical and contemporary ballet, Horton and Graham modern techniques, jazz, lyrical, contemporary and hip hop. After graduating from the University of Central Oklahoma where she studied dance major for one year, she was hired as an Equity dancer at Walt Disney World. Later, Courtney moved to Los Angeles under Brian Friedman's instruction who became her mentor after he met her at the Walt Disney World. Courtney has danced with such artists as Destiny's Child, will.i.am, Chris Brown, Trey Songz, Rihanna and Nelly Furtado. She appeared in several music videos and national commercials. She has worked with choreographers such as Frank Gatson (Kelly Rowland), Brian Friedman (Monster's of Hip Hop), Fatima Robinson (Will.i.am), Rosero McCoy (National Verizon Commercial), Robin Antin, Zachary Woodley (Glee) and more.

In 2008, Courtney became a Pussycat Doll and started performing on various television shows in L.A. as a Pussycat Doll. She also appeared at the Viper Room. Later, she appeared at Glee where she performed with Zachary Woodley. Afterwards, Courtney traveled around Europe as a dancer and singer with some of Greece's biggest artists. She has also been working with choreographer and instructor Chali Jennings as her assistant choreographer. Courtney used her time overseas to share her passion for dance by teaching students and professional dancers in Greece.

Courtney's first appearance in the music industry was in 2010 with her appearance at Thalassa in Greece. After she was done with her appearances at Thalassa she went back to the United States but returned again in September for her collaboration with Helena Paparizou and Antonis Remos in Diogenis Studio.

Two years later, in 2012, she collaborated once again with Helena Paparizou at the song "All the Time" with Playmen and RiskyKidd. After the success of the song, Courtney collaborated once again with Playmen, in 2013, at the song "Breakin' Me Up" which was the music theme of the MadWalk 2013.

Along with Tamta, RiskyKidd, Midenistis and HouseTwins, Courtney presented her new song with RiskyKidd and HouseTwins, "Rhythm Is A Dancer", at the 2013 MAD Video Music Awards. The song is a remake of Snap's song. Courtney won two awards at the MAD VMA, all for her collaboration in the song "All the Time".

In 2014, she released her debut Greek-language solo single, "Agapise Me" (love me), with music and lyrics written by fiancée and lead vocalist of Melisses, Chris Mastoras.

== Discography ==
=== Singles ===
- 2012: "All the Time" (with Playmen, Elena Paparizou and RiskyKidd)
- 2013: "Breakin' Me Up" (with Playmen)
- 2013: "Rhythm Is A Dancer" (with HouseTwins and RiskyKidd)
- 2014: "Agapise Me" (Love Me)
- 2018: "Jealous”

== Awards ==
Year	Recipient	Award	Result
2013	All The Time (Playmen feat. Helena Paparizou, Riskykidd)	Best Dance Video	Won
2013	All The Time (Playmen feat. Helena Paparizou, Riskykidd)	Best Duet/Collaboration	Won
2013	All The Time (Playmen feat. Helena Paparizou, Riskykidd)	Video Clip of the Year	Nominated
2015	Herself	Best New Artist	Nominated
