= Stin Kardia Mou Mono Thlipsi =

Single by Helena Paparizou

from the album Protereotita
- Released: February 2005
- Recorded: 2004
- Genre: Laïko
- Length: 3:01
- Label: Sony BMG/Columbia Records
- Songwriter: Grigoris Petrakos
- Producer: Grigoris Petrakos

Helena Paparizou singles chronology
"Katse Kala" (2004)	"Stin Kardia Mou Mono Thlipsi" (2005)	"My Number One" (2005)

"Stin Kardia Mou Mono Thlipsi" (Greek: Στην Καρδιά Μου Μόνο Θλίψη; English: In my heart there is only sorrow) is a song recorded by Greek-Swedish recording artist Helena Paparizou and written and produced by Grigoris Petrakos. It was released as the fifth and final single from the original edition of her debut album, Protereotita (2004). The song is a downtempo laïko ballad which lyrically speaks of sadness after a break-up and wishing the person to return. It was released in early 2005 shortly after the Hellenic Broadcasting Corporation's (ERT) announcement of Paparizou as Greece's entrant in the Eurovision Song Contest 2005. The song was not heavily promoted and a proper video was not filmed; rather the video was made at the set of a television interview special she had done in Stockholm. It failed to impact the charts and stands as one of her least successful singles in Greece and Cyprus. She has performed it in a few of her concerts and residency shows. The video was also included on her first video album, Number One (2005).

== Music video ==
An official music video was never produced due to time conflicts.

== Track listing ==
1. Stin Kardia Mou Mono Thlipsi 3:01
