= Katse Kala =

Single by Helena Paparizou

from the album Protereotita
- Released: November 2004
- Recorded: 2004
- Genre: Pop music, Tsifteteli
- Length: 4:24
- Label: Sony BMG
- Songwriters: Nikki P., Toni Mavridis
- Producers: Alex Papaconstantinou, Peter Cartries

Helena Paparizou singles chronology
"Anditheseis" (2004)	"Katse Kala" (2004)	"Stin Kardia Mou Mono Thlipsi" (2005)

"Katse Kala" is the fourth single from the album Protereotita released in November 2004.

== Music video ==
The music video was filmed in 2004 of the same month of its release. Helena appeared and Yamaha motorbikes surrounding her. The song was nominated at the Mad Video Music Awards in 2005 and won the category for Best Video by a Female Artist.

== Track listing ==
1. "Katse Kala" (Κάτσε Καλά; Behave yourself) Nikki P., Toni Mavridis Alex Papaconstantinou, Peter Cartries 4:24
