= Psahno Tin Alitheia (song) =

Single by Helena Paparizou

from the album Giro Apo T' Oneiro
- B-side: "Dancing Without Music"
- Released: 20 May 2010
- Recorded: October 2009–February 2010
- Length: 3:09
- Label: Sony Music Greece/RCA
- Songwriters: Per Lidén, Niclas Olausson, Toni Mavridis, Giannis Doxas
- Producers: Don-K (Toni Mavridis and Niclas Olausson)

Helena Paparizou singles chronology
"An Isouna Agapi" (2010)	"Psahno Tin Alitheia" (2010)	"Girna Me Sto Htes" (2010)

"Psahno Tin Alitheia" (Greek: Ψάχνω Την Αλήθεια; English: I search for the truth) is a song by Greek pop/laiko singer Helena Paparizou, written by Per Lidén, Niclas Olausson, Toni Mavridis, and Giannis Doxas for her fourth studio album Giro Apo T'Oneiro. The single released as the third single from the album. The music video contained the ten winners from Ivi's "Vges sto gyali" contest.

== Background ==
The song was composed by Per Lidén, Niclas Olausson, Toni Mavridis with lyrics by Giannis Doxas. It is a song with Paparizou stating that she always searches for the truth as a result of having been raised that way.

Paparizou furthered her collaboration with soft drink company Ivi, which prior to the album's release held a contest for their "Vges sto gyali" campaign, with the winners appearing in Paparizou's newest music video for the brand. Back when "An Isouna Agapi" was released, the company aired an add that included a sample of the song, hinting that it would be the album's next single and not "Girna Me Sto Htes", which according to some sources was originally supposed to be the lead single off the album before being replaced with "An Isouna Agapi". This makes "Psahno Tin Alitheia" her second song for Ivi, following "Tha 'Mai Allios".

== Music video ==
The music video was shot on 8 April 2010 as reported by Paparizou via the social networking website Twitter. The music video was directed by Maria Skoka, who Paparizou had first collaborated with on "Tha 'Mai Allios" and aired on 20 May 2010 on MAD TV, who described it as "full of speed and rhythm". The video begins with Paparizou speeding down a highway in a white convertible. She then parks in a dark garage and proceeds to change behind blinds from her casual clothing into her performance style. As she stands in front of a microphone singing, the lights suddenly turn on and she is surprised to see that her entire band (the Ivi winners) is already there. They continue to perform and dance until the lights are shut off at the end of the song.

== Release history ==
Region	Date	Distributing label	Format
Greece	20 May	Sony Music/RCA	Radio single
Greece	12 April 2010	Sony Music/RCA	Digital download
Cyprus	20 May	Sony Music/RCA	Radio single

== Charts ==
Chart	Peak position
Nielsen Soundscan Greek Digital Singles	21
Nielsen Soundscan Greek Airplay Chart	17
