= Treli Kardia =

Single by Helena Paparizou

from the album Anapandites Kliseis, Protereotita
- A-side: "Anapandites Kliseis"
- Released: February 2004
- Genre: Pop
- Length: 3:29
- Label: Sony Music Greece/Columbia
- Songwriters: Despina Mavridou, Helena Paparizou
- Producers: Alex Papaconstantinou, Marcus Englof

Helena Paparizou singles chronology
"Anapandites Kliseis" (2003)	"Treli Kardia" (2004)	"Anditheseis" (2004)

Treli Kardia (Crazy Heart) is the second single from Helena Paparizou as a solo singer. The song is featured on the CD Single "Anapandites Kliseis" which was released on December 28, 2003, and also at Paparizou's first solo album Protereotita released in June 2004. The song became a big radio hit on Greek radio stations.

She also performed a 2024 Remix by Playmen on MAD VMA for her 20th anniversary of her career. Then the song released on Spotify her EP titled Party All The Time.

== Music video ==
The music video was filmed in a football court in which played two most famous Greek teams, Olympiacos and Panathinaikos during the winter season of 2004. It was directed by Giorgos Gavalos and after was included in Helena's first DVD series titled "My Number One" released in 2005. Helena appeared in the video singing with a ballet on a stage in the middle of the field during the half time of the match.

== Track listing ==
- CD single

2. "Treli Kardia" – 3:29

- Protereotita Album

16. "Treli Kardia" – 3:29
