= Don't Hold Back On Love =

Single by Helena Paparizou

from the album One Life
- Released: May 1, 2014
- Recorded: 2014; Sweden
- Genre: Pop, Dance
- Length: 3:06
- Label: Lionheart Music Group
- Songwriter(s): Jimmy Jansson, Micah Wilshire

Helena Paparizou singles chronology
"Survivor" (2014)	"Don't Hold Back On Love" (2014)	"Otan Aggeli Klene" (2015)

"Don't Hold Back On Love" is a song recorded by Swedish Greek singer-songwriter Helena Paparizou. The song was released on May 1, 2014 as the final single from Paparizou's third English-language album, One Life (2014).

== Background and release ==
Paparizou performed the single for the first time live at The Voice of Greece. The song was written by Jimmy Jansson and Micah Wilshire.

== Music video ==
Helena began shooting the music video for the song in July, Athens. It is a clip with futuristic and advanced view. We see Helena in a modern car wearing black leather pants with metal design illustrations. The video director is Alexandros Grammatopoulos. The music video premiered on Helena's vevo on July 30.
