= All the Time (Playmen song) =

"All The Time"

Single by Playmen and Helena Paparizou featuring Courtney and Riskykidd

from the album Panik Anthem Vol 2
- Released: 2 July 2012
- Recorded: 2012
- Genre: Dance-pop
- Length: 4:16
- Label: Panik Records
- Songwriters: Rick James, Playmen & Riskykidd (Additional lyrics)
- Producers: Playmen, Diveno, Alex Leon

Elena Paparizou singles chronology
"Mr. Perfect" (2011)	"All The Time" (2012)	"Lathos Agapes"" (2012)

"All the Time" is a song by the DJ duo Playmen, featuring Greek-Swedish singer Helena Paparizou, the rapper Riskykidd and Courtney who has collaborated with Helena in vocals since 2009. The song was performed for the first time at Mad VMA 2012 on June 20. The song contains a sample from Eddie Murphy's hit song, "Party All the Time".

== Release and promotion ==
On 2 July 2012, the song had a digital release and, in the beginning of 2013, was released as part of the compilation CD The Anthem Vol. 2 by Panik Records.

== Music video ==
A music video was filmed by director Apollonas Papatheoharis on 14 July 2012. Paparizou uploaded a backstage photo on her Twitter account the same day. The music video was uploaded to Playmen's official YouTube channel on 26 July 2012.

== Track listing ==
- Digital download
1. "All The Time" – 4:16
- Digital download
1. "All The Time" – 4:16

== Charts ==
Chart	Peak position
Greece Airplay (Media Inspector)	2

== Release history ==
Region	Date	Format
Greece	21 June 2012	Radio premiere
