= The Light in Our Soul =

Single by Helena Paparizou

from the album My Number One
- B-side: "Katse Kala (Behave Yourself)"
- Released: 24 August 2005
- Recorded: 2004/2005
- Genre: Dance-pop
- Length: 2:59
- Label: Bonnier Music, Sony BMG
- Songwriter: Costas Bigalis
- Producers: Fredrik Andersson, Niclas Olausson

Helena Paparizou singles chronology
"My Number One" (2005)	"The Light in Our Soul" (2005)	"A Brighter Day" (2005)

"The Light in Our Soul" is a song by Helena Paparizou from her album My Number One.

== Background ==
The song, an up-tempo ballad, was the second single from the album. Written by Costas Bigalis, it was initially chosen for the Eurovision Greek National Final, alongside "O.K." and "Let's Get Wild." However, "My Number One" was ultimately selected. "The Light in Our Soul" was later disqualified because a CD demo version, sung by another artist, had been leaked online and made available for sale on an e-tailer's website. Paparizou confirmed the disqualification during a concert in Chicago, Illinois, mentioning that the leak led to the song's exclusion from Eurovision preselection. She humorously remarked that she doesn't use the internet, saying: "No no, I do not use the internet. This is why we don't like the internet."

== Music video ==
The music video for "The Light in Our Soul" features Paparizou in two distinct settings: one where she is seen singing and another where she walks around a city, illuminating it. The video was recorded in two versions; a Greeklish version aired in Greece, while an English version aired in Sweden.

== Track listing ==
CD single

1. "The Light in Our Soul" – 2:56
2. "The Light in Our Soul" (Greeklish Version) – 2:56
3. "Katse Kala" [Behave Yourself] – 4:23

== Chart performance ==
The song achieved various chart positions across Europe:

Chart (2005)	Peak position
Swedish Singles Chart	3
Romanian Top 100	17
Greek Airplay Chart	2
Latvian Airplay Chart	78
Eurochart Hot 100 Singles	140
Russian Singles Chart	71
Turkish Singles Chart	9
