= Mazi sou =

- Mazi sou TV card
- Genre: Drama
- Starring: Clio-Danae Othoneou (Sophia); Nikos Nikolaou (Leonidas); Apostolis Totsikas (Ares); Marili Milia (Zoe); Rania Sxiza (Helen); Tasos Nousias (Stefanos Anastasiou); Andreas Natsios (Markos); Dina (Zoe Karabasili)
- Opening theme: Mazi sou
- Country of origin: Greece
- Original language: English
- No. of seasons: 1
- No. of episodes: 20

Production
- Running time: 1 hour (per episode)

Original release
- Network: Mega Channel
- Release: 2006 – 2007

Mazi sou (English: With you) is a Greek drama featuring two teenagers whose only common link is their age. Two 17-year-old teens who run away, one from a juvenile institution and the other from her home, and scour Northern Greece and Turkey, following the "arid" railroad near Maritsa's bank.

== Overview ==
Ares (Apostolis Totsikas) runs away from the juvenile institution where he grows up in order to seek his father's identity. Zoe (Marili Milia) lives with her mother who is a politician, without having a substantial contact with her father. When she tries to reach him she learns that the reason for the gap between them is an agreement of her parents. She leaves her home for Alexandroupoli in Greek Thrace as her destination to meet her boyfriend who serves the local army unit.

Zoe will come across with Ares when he steals her wallet and will eventually decide to travel together. Zoe's mother uses her political means and starts an unbelievable man-hunt. She will make an appearance on the TV to make a plea for finding her daughter offering 200.000 Euro
