= Baby It's Over =

2011 single by Elena Paparizou

Single by Helena Paparizou

from the album Greatest Hits & More
- Released: February 18, 2011
- Recorded: 2011
- Genre: Dance
- Length: 3:53
- Label: Sony Greece/RCA
- Songwriters: Tamminen, Ahlstedt, Sörvaag
- Producer: Toni Mavridis

Helena Paparizou singles chronology
"Girna Me Sto Htes" (2010)	"Baby It's Over" (2011)	"Mr. Perfect" (2011)

"Baby It's Over" is a song by the Greek Pop singer Helena Paparizou. It was released as the lead single from her first compilation album Greatest Hits & More, written by Tamminen, Ahlstedt & Sörvaag and produced by DonK. The song first premiered on February 2, 2011, on the MadWalk fashion Event and released as digital download on February 18, 2011.

== Promotion ==
"Baby It's Over" premiered on February 2, 2011, on the MadWalk fashion event, broadcast by popular Greek music channel MAD TV. Paparizou performed Baby It's Over along with "Free Your Mind" by En Vogue, dressed by Apostolos Mitropoulos. Elena also performed the song on the Greek X Factor in its last show, on February 11, 2011.

== Commercial performance ==
"Baby It's Over" debuted at number one at the Greek Digital Chart, staying in the Top 10 for 18 weeks and making it her best selling digital-single to date. On the airplay chart it also peaked at number one, according to Media Inspector, staying at the top for 10 weeks and breaking her record of five weeks in a row with her 2007 single "To Fili Tis Zois". It was her first number one English track in Greece since 2006' "Mambo!". The song had an immediate international digital release via iTunes. "Baby It's Over" managed to be the #1 Greek song at the year end top200 airplay chart and #2 overall, just behind Adele's Rolling In The Deep.

As of July 2015, "Baby It's Over" is the 5th best selling digital single ever in Greece.

== Awards ==
"Baby It's Over" received three nominations at the annual Mad Video Music Awards, "Fashion Icon", "Female Artist Of The Year" and "Artist Of The Year", and managed to win the "Fashion Icon" and "Female Artist" awards at the ceremony that took place on June 13, 2011.

== Music video ==
=== Development ===
Director Konstantinos Rigos created a special video clip with Helena Paparizou being at her best. The shooting was long and took place in Greek Olympic Properties. The models took part in the video were wearing creations by Apostolos Mitropoulos in a different Fashion Show, as previously shown at MadWalk by MAD TV.

=== Synopsis ===
The music video premiered on 12 April 2011 via Helena's VEVO at YouTube. It begins with MadWalk models having fun after MadWalk fashion event. The music video shows couples going through break up situations, like fighting and arguing and Elena subduing a man with chains. Elena is wearing a catsuit and high heels by Alexander McQueen. Then she begins dancing while the video shows models playing with the camera. After a model says "Go Away" on the camera, the scene changes showing Elena cleaning a roof with a vacuum cleaner absorbing electricity from a models mouth. Then she walks through a couple fighting and arguing, which immediately stops. The scene changes again showing Elena dancing with her dancers near sitting models and after that Elena's singing alone near to a model holding a Vodafone chatphone. In the end a model tries to shoot her with a plastic gun, she says "Who Do You Think That You Are?", then Elena continues dancing with her dancers.

== Track listing ==
Digital download
No.	Title	Length
1.	"Baby It's Over"	3:53

Remixes EP
No.	Title	Length
1.	"Baby It's Over (The Thin Red Men Radio Mix)"	3:24
2.	"Baby It's Over (The Thin Red Men Club Mix)"	5:36
3.	"Baby It's Over (Supermarkets Radio Edit)"	3:27
4.	"Baby It's Over (Supermarkets Club Mix)"	3:57

Greatest Hits & More Disc Three - New Songs
No.	Title	Lyrics	Music	Length
1.	"Baby It's Over"	Tamminen, Ahlstedt, Sörvaag	Tamminen, Ahlstedt, Sörvaag	3:53

Bonus Tracks
No.	Title	Lyrics	Music	Length
4.	"Baby It's Over(The Thin Red Men Radio Mix)"	Tamminen, Ahlstedt, Sörvaag	Tamminen, Ahlstedt, Sörvaag	3:24
5.	"Baby It's Over(The Thin Red Men Club Mix)"	Tamminen, Ahlstedt, Sörvaag	Tamminen, Ahlstedt, Sörvaag	5:36
6.	"Baby It's Over(Helena Paparizou VS Supermarkets Radio Mix)"	Tamminen, Ahlstedt, Sörvaag	Tamminen, Ahlstedt, Sörvaag	3:27
7.	"Baby It's Over(Helena Paparizou VS Supermarkets Club Mix)"	Tamminen, Ahlstedt, Sörvaag	Tamminen, Ahlstedt, Sörvaag	3:57

== Charts ==
=== Weekly charts ===
Chart	Peak position
Greece Digital Songs (Billboard)	1
Greece Airplay (Media Inspector)	1
Cyprus (Airplay)	1
Bulgaria (Airplay)	7

=== Year-end charts ===
Chart (2011)	Position
Greece (IFPI)	1
