= Mr. Perfect (song) =

Single by Helena Paparizou
- Released: 2 December 2011
- Recorded: 2011
- Genre: Dance-pop, Hi-NRG
- Length: 3:36
- Label: Sony Music Greece/RCA
- Songwriter(s): Iain James, Matthew Marston, Yulanda Lindsay

Helena Paparizou singles chronology
"Baby It's Over" (2011)	"Mr. Perfect" (2011)	"All The Time" (2012)

"Mr. Perfect" is a song by the Greek singer Helena Paparizou. The song's title was announced in mid-November and was released on 2 December 2011. The song left as a digital release on iTunes due to Helena changed label in 2012 and eliminated from Sony Music Greece.

== Release and promotion ==
On 28 November 2011, Sony Music Greece announced a 5 December 2011 release date and presented a video clip via their official YouTube account that featured a 23-second teaser of the song and the cover art. Due to high anticipation, the song was instead released three days ahead of schedule on 2 December, with its digital download in Greece and Cyprus on 5 December as planned. The song is also available on digital music stores of several European countries. Paparizou performed the song 11 December during the 6th show of Dancing On Ice and later added it to her setlist at her appearances in Thessaloniki at Pyli Axiou with Giannis Parios. Paparizou also performed a remix of the song by Playmen, at the second annual Madwalk By Vodafone, along with Joan Jett's "I Hate Myself For Loving You".

== Music video ==
A music video for the song was filmed by director Konstantinos Rigos in November 2011. Model Nikos Douramanis plays Paparizou's romantic interest. The music video was released on 31 December, and later uploaded at Paparizou's official VEVO channel at YouTube.

== Track listing ==
- Digital download
1. "Mr. Perfect" – 3:36
2. "Mr. Perfect" Playmen Remix - 3:42

== Charts ==
Chart	Peak position
Greek Digital Singles	7
Cypriot Airplay Chart	1
Greek Airplay Chart	29

== Release history ==
Region	Date	Format
Greece	2 December 2011	Radio premiere
Cyprus	2 December 2011	Radio premiere
Belgium	2 December 2011	Digital download
Netherlands	2 December 2011	Digital download
Norway	2 December 2011	Digital download
Greece	5 December 2011	Digital download
Cyprus	5 December 2011	Digital download
France	5 December 2011	Digital download
Poland	5 December 2011	Digital download
