= Girna Me Sto Htes =

Single by Helena Paparizou

from the album Giro Apo T' Oneiro
- Released: 7 October 2010
- Recorded: October 2009–February 2010
- Genre: pop, electropop (remix)
- Length: 4:23; 3:28 (All Around the Dream Remix)
- Label: Sony Music Greece/RCA
- Songwriters: Giorgos Sabanis, Giannis Doxas, Eleana Vrahali, Don-K (remix only)
- Producer: Giorgos Sabanis

Helena Paparizou singles chronology
"Psahno Tin Alitheia" (2009)	"Girna Me Sto Htes" (2010)	"Baby It's Over" (2011)

"Girna Me Sto Htes" (Greek: Γύρνα Με Στο Χτες; English: Bring me back to yesterday) is a song by Greek-Swedish recording artist Helena Paparizou from her fifth studio album Giro Apo T' Oneiro, written and produced by Giorgos Sabanis with lyrics by Giannis Doxas and Eleana Vrahali.

The original version is a pop ballad and a promotional music video of the performance of the album pre-listening is featured on the Deluxe Edition. The song was remixed by Don-K and released as the fourth radio single from the album on 7 October 2010. The remix was later released as a standalone digital download, making it the fifth digital single from the album.

The music video was directed by Evangelos Kalaïtzis and focuses on the 1920s and 1960s. Paparizou has performed the song on television shows such as Kafes Me Tin Eleni as well as her Fisika Mazi tour and Diogenis Studio concert series.

== Composition ==
"Girna Me Sto Htes" is a pop ballad, written and produced by Giorgos Sabanis with lyrics by Giannis Doxas and Eleana Vrahali. For the single's release it was remixed as the "All Around the Dream" version by production duo Don-K, composed of Greek-Swedish songwriter Toni Mavridis, who is also Paparizou's manager and fiancé, as well as Swedish songwriter Niclas Olausson.

== Release ==
"Girna Me Sto Htes" was originally released as a track from Paparizou's fifth studio album Giro Apo T' Oneiro. The "All Around the Dream" remix was released as the album's fourth single to radios on 7 October 2010. It was then released as a digital download on 29 October 2010 as the album's fifth digital single.

== Critical response ==
Although he did not specifically review the song, Makis Kalamaris of Avopolis felt that Sabanis' compositional contributions to the album were its high point.

== Music video ==
=== Development ===
A promotional video for the song from the pre-listening of the album was featured on the Deluxe Edition of the album. The official music video of the song uses the All Around the Dream remix. The music video is directed by Evangelos Kalaītzis. It was filmed in the third week of November from 11 in the morning to midnight of the same day in a seventh floor suite at the Fashion Hotel at Omonoia Square as well as on the streets of the square. Paparizou's hair was done by Bouloubasis, her make-up by Giannis Marketakis, and her three wardrobe choices were selected by Al Giga. Focusing on the title of the song, the music video features the decades of the 1920s and 1960s, which were Paparizou's own selection.

=== Synopsis ===
The music video begins with a man, who plays Paparizou's love interest, searching the song "Girna Me Sto Htes" on YouTube on his laptop computer. The music then begins with Paparizou, in present day, frantically pacing in her hotel room and packing her suitcase. Scenes of her singing in the hotel room are show throughout. She then leaves with it in hand and drops it as she has a vision of her and her lover in the 1960s, where she reads a note and then hugs him. In another scene he runs through flames in a war scene. Back to the present, they are seen speaking to each other on a payphone inside a telephone booth, where there is an advertisement for Hellas Online. They hang up and continue to search for each other through the traffic. Paparizou pulls a lever and another flashback occurs, this time of them having dinner in the 1920s. The man is then seen running through a forest and a lake. He falls backwards into the lake but in reality he actually falls onto the bed in the hotel room in the present. They are reunited as the past life scenes are played backwards and in the present he wakes up.

=== Release and reception ===
The music video was released on 22 November 2010. According to SigmaLive it is different from the typical Paparizou video. The website also found her stylistic transformations to be impressive.

== Live performances ==
Paparizou performed the song live accompanied by a piano on the final episode of Alpha TV's Kafes Me Tin Eleni of the season on 25 June 2010. She performed the song on her joint concert tour with Onirama, Fisika Mazi during the summer. She also performs the song at her winter 2010–11 appearances at Diogenis Studio with Antonis Remos.

== Charts ==
=== Weekly charts ===
Chart	Peak position
Nielsen Soundscan Greek Airplay Chart	7

=== Year-end charts ===
Chart (2011)	Position
Greek Airplay Chart	34

== Track listing ==
1. "Girna Me Sto Htes" (All Around the Dream Version)
