= Protereotita =

2004 album by Elena Paparizou

Studio album by Helena Paparizou
- Released: 27 June 2004
- Recorded: 2003–2004
- Genres: Pop folk, laïko, dance-pop
- Length: 67:21 (Original); 35:46/103:07 (Euro Edition, single/both discs); 45:23 (My Number One); 120:51 (Euro Edition + Mambo!, three discs)
- Languages: Greek (Original); English (Euro Edition, My Number One, Euro Edition + Mambo!)
- Label: Sony Music Greece/Columbia
- Producers: Christos Dantis, Toni Mavridis

Helena Paparizou chronology
Protereotita (2004)	Iparhi Logos (2006)

Alternative cover

My Number One

Euro Edition (2005)

Protereotita (Euro Edition)+ Mambo!

Singles from Protereotita
- 1. "Anapandites Kliseis" Released: 28 December 2003; 2. "Treli Kardia" Released: February 2004; 3. "Anditheseis" Released: July 2004; 4. "Katse Kala" Released: November 2004; 5. "Stin Kardia Mou Mono Thlipsi / Anamniseis" Released: February 2005; 6. "My Number One" Released: 23 April 2005; 7. "The Light in Our Soul/To Fos Sti Psyhi" Released: July 2005 / 24 August 2005; 8. "A Brighter Day (Anditheseis)" Released: 25 November 2005; 9. "Mambo!" Released: 17 November 2005 / 12 April 2006

Professional ratings
Review scores
Source	Rating
Music Corner	(2004)
Music Corner	(2005)

Protereotita (Greek: Προτεραιότητα, lit. 'Priority') is the debut solo album by Greek singer Helena Paparizou, released on 27 June 2004 by Sony Music Greece. The album's first single, Anapandites Kliseis, was released as a CD-single prior to the album's release and reached number 1 on the Greek IFPI singles chart. The album was also re-released twice in Greece, and once internationally as My Number One. Overall, there are five different editions available of the album. The original album was only a mild success, however, following Paparizou's victory in the Eurovision Song Contest the Euro Edition peaked at number one on the charts and was certified platinum by the IFPI. The album was later certified double platinum in early 2006; as IFPI was making a transition in lowering their sales thresholds at that time, this would imply sales of at least 60,000 copies, although sales of up to 87,000 have been claimed.

== Album information ==
Protereotita marked Paparizou's first solo-album after her break-up with Antique. Released in June 2004, the album included five singles: "Anapantites Kliseis", "Treli Kardia", "Katse Kala", "Anditheseis" and "Stin Kardia Mou Mono Thlipsi", which were released as either CD singles or radio single.

Before her participation in the Eurovision Song Contest 2005, Paparizou re-released the album with the title "Protereotita: Euro-Edition" on 31 March 2005. The album included a bonus CD which contained 11 new tracks that included her Greek national final songs, including "My Number One". "My Number One" was Paparizou's second CD single to go to number 1 on the Greek charts.

At the end of 2005 Paparizou re-released the album for the third and final time in Greece and Cyprus as Protereotita: Euro-Edition + Mambo!. This edition included all of the songs from Protereotita: Euro Edition and the songs from the "Mambo!" CD single. Protereotita -including both re-releases- become a huge commercial success for Paparizou, considering that the album was released only in Greece and Cyprus.

Helena released her first international album with the title My Number One on 17 May 2005. My Number One included most of the songs from Protereotita: Euro-Edition, and was released in many parts of Europe including Sweden, Turkey, Switzerland, Hungary, Finland, Slovenia, Russia, Denmark, Poland, the Netherlands and Spain.

== Track listing ==
=== Original ===
No.	Title	Lyrics	Music	Length
1.	"Katse Kala" (Κάτσε Καλά; Behave yourself)	Nikki P., Toni Mavridis	Alex Papaconstantinou, Peter Cartries	4:24
2.	"Protereotita" (Προτεραιότητα; Priority)	Tasos Vougiatzis	Solon Apostolakis	3:17
3.	"Anditheseis" (Αντιθέσεις; Oppositions)	Ilias Filippou	Energee	4:21
4.	"Anamniseis" (Αναμνήσεις; Memories)	Yiannis Doxas	Alex Papaconstantinou, Peter Cartriers	3:50
5.	"Axizi" (Αξίζει; It's worth it)	Tasos Vougiatzis	Solon Apostolakis	4:01
6.	"Taxidi Gia To Agnosto" (Ταξίδι Για Το Άγνωστο; Trip to the unknown)	Vangelis Konstantinidis	Alex Papaconstantinou, Peter Cartriers	4:23
7.	"Galana" (Γαλανά; Blue)	Nikos Vaxevanelis	Vasilis Kelaidis	4:00
8.	"(Eheis Kairo Na Mou Fereis) Louloudia" ((Έχεις Καιρό Να Μου Φέρεις) Λουλούδια (You Have Time To Bring Me) Flowers)	Yiannis Doxas	Dimitris Kontopoulos	4:20
9.	"Stin Kardia Mou Mono Thlipsi" (Στην Καρδιά Μου Μόνο Θλίψη; Only sorrow in my heart)	Grigoris Petrakos	Grigoris Petrakos	3:01
10.	"Zise (Vive La Vida Loca)" (Ζήσε; Live (Live the crazy life))	Vangelis Konstantinidis	Dj Valentino	3:09
11.	"I Zoi Sou Zari" (Η Ζωή Σου Ζάρι; Your life like dice)	Yiannis Doxas	Dimitris Kontopoulos	3:31
12.	"M'angaliazi To Skotadi" (Μ' Αγκαλιάζει Το Σκοτάδι; The darkness embraces me)	Panos Falaras	Vasilis Kelaidis	3:28
13.	"Matia Kai Hili" (Μάτια Και Χείλη; Eyes and lips)	Nikki P.	Alex Papaconstantinou, Peter Cartiers	4:30
14.	"Mesa Sti Fotia Sou" (Μέσα Στη Φωτιά Σου; In your fire)	Giannis Rentoumis	Dimitris Kontopoulos	3:46

Bonus tracks
No.	Title	Lyrics	Music	Length
1.	"Anapandites Kliseis" (Αναπάντητες Κλήσεις; Missed calls)	Vangelis Konstantinidis	Christos Dantis	4:07
2.	"Treli Kardia" (Τρελή Καρδιά; Crazy heart)	Despina Mavridou, Helena Paparizou	Alex Papaconstantinou, Marcus Englof	3:29
3.	"Anapandites Kliseis (SMS Remix)"	Vangelis Konstantinidis	Christos Dantis	6:41

=== Euro Edition (2005) ===
Protereotita: Euro Edition Disc Two, Euro Edition single-disc
No.	Title	Lyrics	Music	Length
1.	"My Number One"	Christos Dantis, Natalia Germanou	Manos Psaltakis, Christos Dantis	2:59
2.	"Ok (English Version)"	Valentino, Christodoulos Siganos	Christodoulos Siganos	2:58
3.	"Let's Get Wild"	Douglas Carr, Vincent Degiorgio, Kasper Lindgren, Joakim Udd	Douglas Carr, Vincent Degiorgio, Kasper Lindgren, Joakim Udd	3:09
4.	"The Light in Our Soul"	Kostas Bigalis	Kostas Bigalis	2:58
5.	"I Don't Want You Here Anymore (Anapandites Kliseis)"	Vaggelis Konstantinidis, Charlie Dilks	Christos Dantis	4:08
6.	"A Brighter Day (Anditheseis)"	Ilias Filippou, Adam Baptiste	Energee	3:36
7.	"If You Believe Me (Anamniseis)"	Yiannis Doxas, Adam Baptiste, Samuel Waermo	Alex Papaconstantinou, Peter Cartiers	4:04
8.	"Louloudia (Ballad Version)"	Yiannis Doxas	Dimitris Kontopoulos	3:20
9.	"To Fos Sti Psyhi (The Light in Our Soul)" (Το Φως Στη Ψυχή; The light in the soul)	Kostas Bigalis	Kostas Bigalis	2:58
10.	"Ok (Greek Version)"	Valentino, Christodoulos Siganos	Christodoulos Siganos	3:09
11.	"My Number One (Karaoke Version)" (2:58)	Christos Dantis, Natalia Germanou	Manos Psaltakis, Christos Dantis	2:54

=== My Number One (2005) ===
Standard edition
No.	Title	Lyrics	Music	Length
1.	"My Number One"	Christos Dantis, Natalia Germanou	Manos Psaltakis, Christos Dantis	2:59
2.	"Let's Get Wild"	Douglas Carr, Vincent Degiorgio, Kasper Lindgren, Joakim Udd	Douglas Carr, Vincent Degiorgio, Kasper Lindgren, Joakim Udd	3:09
3.	"The Light in Our Soul"	Kostas Bigalis	Kostas Bigalis	2:58
4.	"Ok"	Valentino, Christodoulos Siganos	Christodoulos Siganos	2:58
5.	"I Don't Want You Here Anymore (Anapandites Kliseis)"	Vaggelis Konstantinidis, Charlie Dilks	Christos Dantis	4:08
6.	"A Brighter Day (Anditheseis)"	Ilias Filippou, Adam Baptiste	Energee	3:36
7.	"If You Believe Me (Anamniseis)"	Yiannis Doxas, Adam Baptiste	Alex Papaconstantinou, Peter Cartiers	4:04
8.	"Katse Kala (Behave Yourself)"	Nikki P., Mavridis	Alex Papaconstantinou, Peter Cartiers	4:24
9.	"Treli Kardia (Crazy Heart)"	Despina Mavridou, Helena Paparizou		3:29
10.	"Axizi (It's Worth It)"	Tasos Vougiatzis	Solon Apostolakis	3:24
11.	"Stin Kardia Mou Mono Thlipsi (Sorrow in My Heart)"	Grigoris Petrakos	Grigoris Petrakos	3:01
12.	"Taxidi Gia Ton Agnosto (Trip to the Unknown)"	Vangelis Konstantinidis	Alex Papaconstantinou, Peter Cartriers	4:23
13.	"Louloudia (Ballad Version) (Flowers)"	Yiannis Doxas	Alex Papaconstantinou	3:18
14.	"My Number One (Chris "The Greek" Remix)"	Christos Dantis, Natalia Germanou	Manos Psaltakis, Christos Dantis	3:32

Bonus tracks edition
No.	Title	Lyrics	Music	Length
1.	"My Number One"	Christos Dantis, Natalia Germanou	Manos Psaltakis, Christos Dantis	2:59
2.	"Anapandites Kliseis (Missed Calls)"	Vangelis Konstantinidis	Christos Dantis	3:06
3.	"Let's Get Wild"	Douglas Carr, Vincent Degiorgio, Kasper Lindgren, Joakim Udd	Douglas Carr, Vincent Degiorgio, Kasper Lindgren, Joakim Udd	3:09
4.	"A Brighter Day (Anditheseis)"	Ilias Filippou, Adam Baptiste	Energee	3:33
5.	"OK"	Valentino, Christodoulos Siganos	Christodoulos Siganos	2:58
6.	"The Light in Our Soul"	Kostas Bigalis	Kostas Bigalis	2:56
7.	"Stin Kardia Mou Mono Thlipsi (Sorrow in My Heart)"	Grigoris Petrakos	Grigoris Petrakos	3:01
8.	"Katse Kala (Behave Yourself)"	Nikki P., Toni Mavridis	Alex Papaconstantinou, Peter Cartiers	4:24
9.	"Taxidi Gia To Agnosto (Trip to the Unknown)"	Vangelis Konstantinidis	Alex Papaconstantinou, Peter Cartriers	4:23
10.	"Axizi (It's Worth It)"	Tasos Vougiatzis	Solon Apostolakis	3:24
11.	"Stin Kardia Mou Mono Thlipsi (Sorrow in My Heart)"	Grigoris Petrakos	Grigoris Petrakos	3:01
12.	"Taxidi Gia Ton Agnosto (Trip to the Unknown)"			4:23
13.	"If You Believe Me (Anamniseis)"			4:02
14.	"Treli Kardia (Crazy Heart)"	Mavridi, Paparizou		3:29
15.	"I Zoe Sou Zari (Dice)"			3:31
16.	"Matia Ke Hili (Eyes and Lips)"			4:30
17.	"M'Angaliazi To Skotadi (Darkness Embraces Me)"			3:29
18.	"Axizi (It's Worth It)"			3:24
19.	"Anapandites Kliseis (SMS Remix)"	Konstantinidis	Dantis	6:41

=== Protereotita: Euro Edition + Mambo! (2005) ===
Protereotita: Euro Edition + Mambo! Disc Three
No.	Title	Lyrics	Music	Length
1.	"Mambo! (Greek Version)"	Yiannis Doxas	Alex Papaconstantinou, Marcus Englof, Samuel Waermo	3:05
2.	"Panda Se Perimena (Idaniko Fili)" (Πάντα Σέ Περιμένα (Ιδανικό Φιλί) I waited for you forever (Suitable kiss))	Natalia Germanou	Toni Mavridis, Niclas Olausson	3:50
3.	"I Agapi Sou Den Meni Pia Edo (Aşkın Açamadığı Kapı)" (Η Αγάπη Σου Δε Μένει Πια Εδώ; Your love no longer lives here (The door that love could not open))	Eleni Giannatsoulia	Ersay Uner, Suat Aydogan	3:51
4.	"Asteria" (Αστέρια; Stars)	Dimos Milonas	Evripidis Nikolidis	3:52
5.	"Mambo! (English Version)"	Mack	Alex Papaconstantinou, Marcus Englof, Samuel Waermo	3:06

== Singles ==
=== Greek singles ===
The first single to be released from the original album Protereotita was "Anapandites Kliseis". "Anapantites Kliseis"' was double A-side single with "Treli Kardia." The single peaked at number 1 for a successful 6 weeks. After the release of the CD single a number of singles (video clips) followed throughout the year. The first being "Katse Kala", which was followed by "Antitheseis" then the last being "Stin Kardia Mou Mono Thlipsi". Then, "Anamnisis" was released as a radio-promo-only single.

1. "Anapandites Kliseis" (CD) (Directed by Manolis Tzirakis)
2. "Treli Kardia" (Directed by Giorgos Gavalos/View Studio)
3. "Katse Kala" (Directed by Giorgos Gavalos/View Studio)
4. "Antitheseis" (Directed by Manolis Tzirakis)
5. "Stin Kardia Mou Mono Thlipsi" (Directed by Manolis Tzirakis)
6. "My Number One" (CD) (Directed by Kostas Kapetanidis)
7. "The Light in Our Soul" (CD) (Directed by Manolis Tzirakis)
8. "Mambo!" (CD) (Directed by Manolis Tzirakis)

=== International singles ===
The following singles were released internationally off of My Number One:'

"My Number One"

The first single released from My Number One was Elena's winning song from the 2005 Eurovision Song Contest "My Number One". The single went to number one in Sweden for 4 very successful weeks. The single stayed on the charts for 29 weeks overall. In Europe it was a big hit, charting in many countries in singles charts and having airplay success.

"The Light in Our Soul"

The second single to be released from the album was "The Light in Our Soul" which was another successful single from the album and peaked at number three. The single was only released in Sweden. The song stayed a hit in Sweden over the summer and stayed on the charts for 24 weeks. It was still in the Swedish charts in early 2006. It had airplay success in certain european countries even if it wasn't released anywhere except Sweden.

"A Brighter Day"

The last single to be released from the album was "A Brighter Day." This was in Elena's least successful single to date as a solo artist in Sweden. The single reached number twenty-four (#24) and stayed on the charts for 10 weeks. The reason the single peaked at a low chart position was due to Elena promoting her new single "Mambo!" in Greece and did not have the time to promote "A Brighter Day" in Sweden. Also, no video was filmed for the single which might have contributed to its lack of success.

== Release history ==
Region	Date	Label	Format	Version
Greece	27 June 2004	Sony Music, Columbia	CD	Original
Cyprus	27 June 2004	Sony Music, Columbia	CD	Original
Greece	31 March 2005	Sony Music, Columbia	CD	Euro-Edition
Cyprus	31 March 2005	Sony Music, Columbia	CD	Euro-Edition
Sweden	17 May 2005	Bonnier Amigo	CD	My Number One
Poland	20 June 2005	Sony BMG	CD	My Number One
Turkey	1 July 2005	Sony BMG	CD	My Number One
Spain	15 July 2005	Sony BMG	CD	My Number One
Switzerland	18 July 2005	Sony BMG	CD, digital download	My Number One
Hungary	28 July 2005	Sony BMG	CD	My Number One
Greece	24 November 2005	Sony Music, Columbia	CD	Euro-Edition + Mambo!
Cyprus	24 November 2005	Sony Music, Columbia	CD	Euro-Edition + Mambo!
Netherlands	12 December 2005	Sony BMG	CD	My Number One

== Charts ==
Protereotita was a very successful album in Cyprus and Greece, where it peaked at number 1 for eight weeks. This was Elena's most successful album to date in Greece as a solo artist. The success of the album continued to grow as Elena released singles and video clips from the album throughout the year of 2004 up to Elena was picked for the 2005 Eurovision Song Contest in Kyiv which she won. On 2007 Elena was awarded with the European Borders Breakers Award in Cannes, for the sales of her international releasing.

My Number One debuted on the Swedish charts at 34 and peaked at 13, remaining in that position for two weeks. The album stayed on the chart for 22 weeks (5½ months) with its last charted position 36 on 27 October 2005.

Chart	Peak position	Weeks On Charts
Greek Albums Chart	1	80
Cypriot Album Chart	1	68
Swedish Album Chart	13	22

== Certifications ==
Region	Certification	Certified units/sales
Greece (IFPI Greece)	2× Platinum	40,000^{^}
Cyprus (IFPI Cyprus)	Platinum	10,000^{*}
^{^} Shipments figures based on certification alone.
