= An Isouna Agapi =

Single by Helena Paparizou

from the album Giro Apo T' Oneiro
- Released: 24 February 2010
- Recorded: October 2009–February 2010
- Genre: Pop folk
- Length: 4:18
- Label: Sony Music Greece/RCA
- Songwriters: Giorgos Sabanis, Niki Papatheohari
- Producer: Giorgos Sabanis

Helena Paparizou singles chronology
"Tha 'Mai Allios" (2009)	"An Isouna Agapi" (2010)	"Psahno Tin Alitheia" (2010)

"An Isouna Agapi" (Greek: Αν Ήσουνα Αγάπη; English: If you were love) is the second single by Greek singer Helena Paparizou from her fifth studio album Giro Apo T'Oneiro, written by Giorgos Sabanis and Niki Papatheohari. The song was chosen for "Best Song in Balkans from Greece" at the Balkan Music Awards 2010.

== Composition ==
The music was composed by singer-songwriter Giorgos Sabanis while the lyrics were written by Niki Papatheohari. The song is an uptempo ballad.

== Release ==
"An Isouna Agapi" was announced as the second single, with a release date of 25 February. However, the song debuted exclusively on Dromos FM 89.8 one day earlier. The radio station announced a contest for its audience coinciding with the single's release date: the winners will get the chance to meet Paparizou and hear her new album before it is released on 28 February 2010 at seven pm at an undisclosed venue.

== Chart performance ==
"An Isouna Agapi" peaked at #5 on the official Greek Digital Singles chart published by Billboard. It also peaked at #7 at the official Greek airplay chart by Nielsen Music Control.

== Music video ==
Paparizou announced on her Twitter that she was meeting with video director Konstantinos Rigos to discuss a music video for the single. The filming of the music video took place on 4 March at the Astir Palace hotel and lasted 16 hours. Paparizou then posted photos from the video on her Twitter, asking fans for their critiques. The music video is mostly in black and white, and features model Dimitris Alexandrou as her love interest. It was nominated for Sexiest Appearance in a Video, as well as contributing to nominations for Female Artist of the Year and Artist of the Year at the MAD Video Music Awards 2010.

== Track listing ==
1. "An Isouna Agapi"

== Charts ==
Chart	Peak position
Billboard Greek Digital Singles	5
Greek Airplay Top 40 (Only Greek Songs)	4
Greek Airplay Chart	7
