= Rendez-Vous (Nikos Aliagas & Friends album) =

Studio album by Nikos Aliagas and friends
- Released: 17 October 2007
- Recorded: 2007
- Genre: Pop, rock
- Length: 57:49
- Language: English, Greek, French, Italian
- Label: Sony BMG Greece
- Producer: Takis Morakis, Antonis Skokos, Paul Weller, Bill Withers, Raphael Haroche, Pascal Obispo, Leonard Cohen, Souad Massi, Abbey Lincoln, Johnny Hallyday, Daniel Deshaime, Jacques Revaux, China Forbes, Kurt Weill, Jean Fauque

Singles from Rendez-Vous
- 1. "Zileia Monaksia" Released: 2007; 2. "Mine Ki Allo (Ain't No Sunshine)" Released: 2007; 3. "Xara Mou" Released: 2008

Rendez-Vous is a concept album by the French-born Greek presenter, author and singer-songwriter Nikos Aliagas, released on 17 October 2007 in Greece, Cyprus, France and Turkey. The album achieved considerable success and it was certificated gold in Greece.

== Album information ==
=== Participants ===
Many international stars and friends of Nikos participated in the album. Some of them are Paul Anka, Antonis Remos, Elena Paparizou, Christos Dantis, Gorgia, Murray Head, NiVo, Adam Cohen, Souad Massi, Demi Evans, Liane Foly, Nolwenn Leroy and Irini Kiriakidou.

=== Style and lyrical content ===
The album contains many different styles of songs from jazz to rock and rap. There are 13 duets which are covers from very popular songs.

== Track listing ==
1. "Hara Mou" (Nikos Aliagas)
2. "Mack the Knife" (duet with Paul Anka)
3. "You Do Something to Me" (duet with Murray Head)
4. "Mine Ki Allo (Ain't No Sunshine)" (duet with Antonis Remos and NiVo)
5. "Mi Mou Milas (Rendez-Vous)" (duet with Gorgia)
6. "Zileia Monaksia (L' Envie D' Aimer)" (duet with Helena Paparizou)
7. "Horepse Me San Paidi (Dance Me to the End of Love)" (duet with Adam Cohen)
8. "Trifera" (Ghir Enta) (duet with Souad Massi)
9. "Blues for Mama" (duet with Demi Evans)
10. "Ena Palio Tragoudi Blues (Toute La Musique Que J' Aime)" (duet with Christos Dantis)
11. "Ils S'Aiment" (duet with Liane Foly)
12. "Opos Sinithos" (May Way ad.of Comme D' Habitude) (duet with Antonis Remos)
13. "Una Notte a Napoli" (duet with Irini Kiriakidou)
14. "I Proteleftaia Goulia" (Slamos) (Nikos Aliagas)
15. "La Nuit Je Mens" (duet with Nolwenn Leroy)

== DVD features ==
- Recording sessions of the album in France, Los Angeles and Greece.
- Interviews from the participants and backstage scenes from the concert.

== Release history ==
Region	Date	Distributing label	Format
Greece	17 October 2008	Sony BMG Greece	CD
Greece	17 October 2007	Sony BMG Greece	Digital download
Cyprus	17 October 2007	Sony BMG Greece	CD
France	27 May 2008	Sony BMG France	CD
Turkey	28 March 2008	Sony BMG Turkey	CD

== Charts ==
Chart	Providers	Peak position	Certification	Sales
Greek Albums Chart	IFPI	1	Gold	10,000
Cypriot Album Chart	All Records Top 20	1		
