= Tha 'Mai Allios =

Single by Helena Paparizou

from the album Giro Apo T' Oneiro
- Released: April 10, 2009
- Recorded: 2009
- Genre: Pop rock
- Length: 3:05
- Label: Sony Music Greece/RCA
- Songwriters: Per Lidén, Robin Fredriksson, Mattias Larsson, Eleana Vrahali
- Producers: Don-K (Niclas Olausson, Toni Mavridis)

Helena Paparizou singles chronology
"Eisai I Foni" (2009)	"Tha 'Mai Allios" (2009)	"An Isouna Agapi" (2010)

"Tha 'Mai Allios" (Greek: Θα 'Mαι Αλλιώς; English: I'll be different) is a song by Greek pop/laiko singer Helena Paparizou. It was released as a promo single and digital download on 10 April 2009. However, the song was instead included on Paparizou's fifth studio album Giro Apo T' Oneiro as the lead single.

== Background ==
The song was posted on MAD TV on April 12, 2009. Also the company Ivi in the new campaign "Fersou Fisika" continues its collaboration with Elena Paparizou. After last year's successful summer tour Arhizei To Party which was attended by more than 190 thousand spectators in 29 cities in Greece, Paparizou and Ivi collaborated again. The company chose Paparizou because she expressed all the values that characterize the new philosophy, such as freshness, naturalness, authenticity, good will and humour. As part of this collaboration "Tha 'Mai Allios" was written. In addition, a new promotional spot aired starting 12 May in which Paparizou has the leading role as Ivi's "sweet bird". Thus, after the cat and the reindeer, Ivi shows Paparizou's everyday and natural behavior.

== Chart performance ==
The song peaked at #2 at the Greek airplay chart. On 7 January 2009 Cypriot radio station Super Fm published the most played songs of 2009 according to Nielsen Music Control. Tha 'Mai Allios managed to be the fifth most played Greek track for 2009.

== Music video ==
The music video was directed by Maria Skoka and it was premiered on MAD TV in May 2009. The video begins with Paparizou waking up in the morning and dancing around in her room. She holds a feathered pillow and an Ivi brand soft drink, the corporate sponsor of the video, which explodes because it was shaken. Elena then puts her makeup while getting ready to go out. The next scene shows Paparizou in a garden at night with many candles sometimes sitting on a garden chair or running back and forth the garden. Many scenes from the video were used for Ivi's commercial. The making of the video and the commercial was uploaded at Paparizou's official YouTube channel.

== Track listing ==
1. "Tha 'Mai Allios"

== Charts ==
Chart	Peak position
Billboard Greek Singles Chart	2
Greek Airplay Chart (Greek songs only)	2
Greek Airplay Chart	4
Greek Music Control Airplay Top 100 of 2009	24
Greek Airplay Chart Top 100 of 2009 (Greek songs only)	9

== Release history ==
Region	Date	Distributing label	Format
Greece	10 April 2009	Sony Music/RCA	Radio Single
Greece	18 May 2009	Sony Music/RCA	Digital download
Cyprus	April 10, 2009	Sony Music/RCA	Radio Single
Spain	8 June 2009	Sony Music/RCA	Digital download
Scandinavia	8 June 2009	Sony Music/RCA	Digital download
