= My Number One =

2005 song by Helena Paparizou

Single by Helena Paparizou

from the album Protereotita: Euro Edition and My Number One
- B-side: "I Don't Want You Here Anymore" (Anapandites Kliseis); "Ok"
- Released: 24 March 2005
- Recorded: 2005
- Studio: Vox
- Genre: Greek pop; Greek folk music (Pontic); Greek folk dance
- Length: 2:58
- Label: Sony BMG Greece; Columbia
- Composers: Manolis Psaltakis (Note: By a 2013 Greek court decision.); Christos Dantis
- Lyricists: Christos Dantis; Natalia Germanou
- Producer: Christos Dantis

Helena Paparizou singles chronology
"Anapandites Kliseis" (2003)	"My Number One" (2005)	"The Light in Our Soul" (2005)

Music video
- "My Number One" on YouTube

Alternative cover
- US cover for My Number One

Eurovision Song Contest 2005 entry
- Country: Greece
- Artist: Helena Paparizou
- Language: English
- Composers: Manolis Psaltakis; Christos Dantis
- Lyricists: Christos Dantis; Natalia Germanou

Finals performance
- Final result: 1st
- Final points: 230

Entry chronology
- ◄ "Shake It" (2004)
- "Everything" (2006) ►

Official performance video
- "My Number One" (Final) on YouTube

"My Number One" is a song recorded by Greek-Swedish singer Helena Paparizou with music composed by Manolis Psaltakis and Christos Dantis, lyrics written by Dantis and Natalia Germanou, and produced by Dantis. It represented Greece in the Eurovision Song Contest 2005, held in Kyiv, resulting in the country's only ever victory in the contest.

== Background and composition ==
"My Number One" was composed by Manolis Psaltakis and Christos Dantis, with lyrics by Dantis and Natalia Germanou, and produced by Dantis. The composition had initially been credited only to Dantis, however, a 2013 lawsuit by musician Manolis Psaltakis resulted in the credit being assigned also to him.

The song is notable for casting elements of traditional Greek music in a contemporary dance music setting: its arrangement includes bouzoukis and a solo featuring a Cretan lyra. The song's lyrics describe the singer's appreciation for her lover who is lauded as her "number one" and "the only treasure [she]'ll ever have".

== Release and promotion ==
Paparizou released "My Number One" as a single, with the release of a Swedish album which contained the song following, and a Greek re-released of her first album Protereotita featuring the song and the other songs in the running for the national final. It sold over 90,000 copies in Greece and was certified double platinum.

Shortly after the song was selected for Eurovision, its music video was shot in one day at the Thessaloniki Science Center and Technology Museum in Thessaloniki. Paparizou then went on a European promotional tour visiting over twenty countries on her tour, and singing on various television shows, as well as giving many interviews.

In early 2006, it was announced that "My Number One" and "Mambo!" would be remixed and released in the United States by Moda Records. On 22 August, a maxi CD single was released to record stores, featuring ten remixes, and the original song; the mixes were also released as digital downloads on 4 June. The music video of "My Number One" premiered in the United States in 2006. There were two separate videos. One is the original video, that was also shown in Europe. The second is a re-edited version of the same video, to the beat of the Josh Harris Remix from the CD Single.

== Eurovision Song Contest ==
The Hellenic Broadcasting Corporation (ERT) internally selected Helena Paparizou as its performer for the 50th edition of the Eurovision Song Contest. ERT then selected four songs –"My Number One", "OK", "Let's Get Wild", and "The Light in Our Soul"– to be performed by her in a televised national final aired on 2 March 2005. Shortly before the national final, it was revealed that "The Light in Our Soul" had been already released by Big Alice, thus it was disqualified, leaving out only three songs. "My Number One" gained a combined 66.47% from televoting and jury votes winning the competition and becoming the Greek entry for Eurovision. The chorus of the song had already become a chant for AEK Athens supporters.

On 21 May 2005, the final for the Eurovision Song Contest was held at the Palace of Sports in Kyiv hosted by the National Television Company of Ukraine (NTU), and broadcast live throughout the continent. As Greece had finished third at the previous contest, the song had been pre-qualified for the final. Paparizou performed "My Number One" nineteenth on the evening, following Croatia's "Vukovi umiru sami" by Boris Novković and LADO and preceding Russia's "Nobody Hurt No One" by Natalia Podolskaya. During her performance, she did a stage show of the song, choreographed by Fokas Evangelinos. Some of the memorable visuals from the show include her dancing a traditional Greek Pontian dance, the four dancers making the shape on the number 1 of the floor –showed from aerial camera– and her playing an imaginary lyra while her dancers pick her up.

At the close of voting, it had received 230 points, finishing at the head of a twenty-four-strong field, winning the contest. "My Number One" held two Eurovision records: it was the first song scored an average of only 6.05 points per jury, the lowest average for a winning song at the time; (Note: This record was previously held by Yugoslavia in 1989 with the song "Rock Me", and was later broken by Azerbaijan in 2011 with "Running Scared" by Ell & Nikki.) and it had the most sets of 12 points given out to one country until then, tying with United Kingdom's 1997 entry "Love Shine a Light". (Note: "My Number One" received 12 points ten times, tying it with the United Kingdom's 1997 entry "Love Shine a Light" by Katrina and the Waves for the record –televoting was only in place for five countries at the time–. This record was later broken by "Fairytale", the winning song in 2009, which scored 12 points from sixteen countries, and is currently held by the 2022 winner, "Stefania", which received twenty-eight sets of 12 points from televoting and five from juries.)

== Legacy ==
After its win Eurovision, a mass party started on the streets of Athens. People went out onto the streets with Greek flags, and started singing "My Number One", as well as honking car horns. This was similar to when Greece won Euro 2004, the 2005 Eurobasket title and when Greece won the silver medal in the 2006 FIBA World Championship. When Paparizou arrived back to Greece from Kyiv, mass crowds met her at the Athens International Airport, where she held up a Greek flag and the trophy.

"My Number One" was one of fourteen songs chosen by Eurovision fans and a European Broadcasting Union (EBU) reference group, from among the 992 songs that had ever participated in the contest, to participate in the fiftieth anniversary competition Congratulations: 50 Years of the Eurovision Song Contest held on 22 October 2005 in Copenhagen. Paparizou performed the song in the competition, where it was named as one of the five greatest Eurovision entries of all time, earning the 4th place.

As the winning broadcaster, the EBU gave ERT the responsibility to host the 2006 edition of the Eurovision Song Contest. The semi-final held on 18 May 2006, opened with a medley of former Eurovision songs performed by different Greek gods, with all the cast finishing with "My Number One". The final held on 20 May 2006, opened with a ballet dance, after which Paparizou was introduced as the reigning winner and she performed the song. She also performed "Mambo!" at the interval act and presented the trophy to the winners.

On 22 May 2021, the interval act "Rock the Roof" in the Eurovision Song Contest 2021 final featured a revamped version of "My Number One" performed by Paparizou. On 9 May 2024, she performed the song as part of a sing-along interval act in the second semi-final of the 2024 contest held in Malmö, Sweden. (Note: In a medley with "Everyway That I Can" by Sertab Erener and "Take Me to Your Heaven" by Charlotte Perrelli.)

== Formats and track listings ==
European 2-track CD single

1. "My Number One" – 2:58
2. "I Don't Want You Here Anymore" – 4:09

Scandinavian 2-track CD single

1. "My Number One" – 2:58
2. "My Number One" (Instrumental) – 2:58

European CD maxi-single

1. "My Number One" – 2:58
2. "I Don't Want You Here Anymore" – 4:09
3. "O.K." – 2:58
4. "My Number One" (Video)

US CD maxi-single

1. "My Number One" (Josh Harris Radio Mix) – 3:38
2. "My Number One" (Norty Cotto's My Radio Lover Mix) – 3:29
3. "My Number One" (Original Mix) – 2:55
4. "My Number One" (Georgie's #1 Radio Anthem Mix) – 3:18
5. "My Number One" (Mike Cruz Radio Mix) – 4:03
6. "My Number One" (Chris "The Greek" Panaghi Radio Mix) – 3:35
7. "My Number One" (Valentino's Radio Epic Mix) – 3:02
8. "My Number One" (Josh Harris Vocal Club Mix) – 6:53
9. "My Number One" (Norty Cotto's My Clubber Lover Mix) – 6:57
10. "My Number One" (Georgie's #1 Anthem Mix) – 7:00
11. "My Number One" (Mike Cruz Vox Mix) – 9:44

== Credits and personnel ==
Credits adapted from liner notes.

Locations

- Recorded at Vox Studios (Athens, Greece)

Personnel

- Christina Argyri – vocals
- Aris Binis – sound engineer, production assistant
- Christos Dantis – arrangement, production, songwriting
- Christos Ekmetzoglou – Pontian lyra
- Natalia Germanou – songwriting
- Panayiotis Gotsis – Cretan lyra
- Yannis Ioannidis – mastering
- Katerina Kyriakou – vocals
- Yannis Lionakis – bouzouki
- Alex Panayi – vocals
- Helena Paparizou – lead vocals
- Petros Parashis – artwork
- Christos Prendoulis – photography
- Manos Psaltakis – songwriting
- Petros Siakavellas – mastering

== Commercial performance ==
After the Eurovision victory, the video for the song was released in several countries throughout Europe. It went to #1 in both Greece and Paparizou's native Sweden for 4 weeks and was certified gold in both countries. The song was played constantly in Greece all through the summer. The success of the single is credited to the popular remix from Chris "The Greek" Panaghi which Sony (Greece) commissioned for the remix.

The song peaked on the Billboard Hot Dance Club Play chart at number 8 and number 25 on the Billboard Hot Dance Singles Sales. In September 2006, the Georgie’s #1 Radio Anthem Mix was added to popular American retailer Abercrombie & Fitch's store playlist nationwide.

=== Charts ===
Chart (2005)	Peak position
Austria (Ö3 Austria Top 40)	44
Belgium (Ultratop 50 Flanders)	10
Belgium (Ultratop 50 Wallonia)	36
CIS Airplay (TopHit)	19
Eurochart Hot 100 Singles	17
Germany (GfK)	37
Greece (IFPI Greece)	1
Hungary (Single Top 40)	9
Netherlands (Single Top 100)	24
Romania (UPFR)	4
Russia Airplay (TopHit)	25
Sweden (Sverigetopplistan)	1
Switzerland (Schweizer Hitparade)	15
Turkey (Turkish Singles Chart)	33

Chart (2006)	Peak position
US Dance Club Songs (Billboard)	8
US Billboard Hot Dance Singles Sales	25

=== Year-end charts ===
Chart (2005)	Position
Belgium (Ultratop 50 Flanders)	53
CIS (Tophit)	75
Russia Airplay (TopHit)	66
Sweden (Hitlistan)	9

=== Certifications ===
Region	Certification	Certified units/sales
Sweden (GLF)	Gold	10,000^{^}
^{^} Shipments figures based on certification alone.

== Release history ==
Country	Date	Label	Format
Greece	24 March 2005	Sony BMG	
Sweden	4 May 2005	Bonnier Amigo	CD single, digital download
Finland	4 May 2005	Bonnier Amigo	CD single, digital download
Denmark	30 May 2005	Bonnier Amigo	CD single, digital download
Norway	30 May 2005	Bonnier Amigo	CD single, digital download
Germany	30 May 2005	Sony BMG	CD single, digital download
Austria	30 May 2005	Sony BMG	CD single, digital download
Netherlands	6 June 2005	Sony BMG	CD single
Belgium	6 June 2005	Sony BMG	CD single
Portugal	7 June 2005	Sony BMG	CD single
Italy	1 July 2005	Sony BMG	CD Single, digital download
United States	4 June 2006	Moda	Digital download
United States	22 August 2006	Moda	CD single

== Legacy ==
=== Cover versions ===
- In 2006, the heavy metal band Dream Evil recorded a tongue-in-cheek cover of the song for their album United.
- In 2024, Thanasis Alevras and Jérôme Kaluta performed a duet cover with accompaniment by the ERT Symphony Orchestra.

=== In other media ===
- In 2008, a part of this song was sampled for "Thara Thara Onthara" of Kannada-language film Bindaas.
- In 2009, "My Number One" made its way to the PlayStation 3 karaoke game Singstar as downloadable content. It was previously released in the Swedish version of the game, but it is the first time it has become accessible to players from all over Europe.

== Notes ==
Preceded by "Wild Dances" by Ruslana	Eurovision Song Contest winners 2005	Succeeded by "Hard Rock Hallelujah" by Lordi
