= Anapandites Kliseis =

Single by Helena Paparizou

from the album Protereotita
- Released: 28 December 2003
- Genre: Dance-pop
- Length: 4:07
- Label: Sony Music Greece/Columbia
- Songwriters: Christos Dantis, Vangelis Konstantinidis

Helena Paparizou singles chronology
"Anapandites Kliseis" (2003)	"My Number One" (2005)

Alternative cover
- SMS Remix Cover

"Anapandites Kliseis" (Unanswered calls) is the first single from Helena Paparizou as a solo singer. It was released on 28 December 2003, and followed by Paparizou's first solo album, Protereotita, in June 2004. The song was written by Christos Dantis and Vangelis Konstantinidis. The CD single was certified Gold in Greece.

The SMS Remix of the song was released as a promotional single and included with issues of Celebrity Magazine.

Paparizou performed a new version of the song, featuring Christos Dantis, for MAD TV's MAD Video Music Awards. She also performed a 2024 Remix by Playmen on MAD VMA for her 20th anniversary of her career. Then the song released on Spotify her EP titled Party All The Time.

== Music video ==
In the music video for "Anapandites Kliseis", Paparizou is in a club with a number of other people, all dancing. She is seen dancing and singing multiple times throughout the video. She is calling someone but cannot get an answer. A music video for the album's "Treli Kardia" was also made.

== Track listing ==
- CD single
1. "Anapantites Kliseis" – 4:07
2. "Treli Kardia" – 3:31
3. "Brosta Ston Kathrefti" – 3:22
- Promo single
1. "Anapandites Kliseis" (SMS Remix) – 6:41

== Charts and certifications ==
Chart	Peak position	Certification
Greek Singles Chart	1	Gold
