= Misi Kardia =

2016 single by Elena Paparizou

Single by Helena Paparizou

from the album Ouranio Toxo
- Released: 15 February 2016
- Recorded: 2015
- Genre: Rock Ballad
- Length: 3:59
- Label: EMI Music Greece
- Songwriters: Andy Nicolas, Giannis Doxas, Chris Mazz
- Producers: Chris Mazz, Andy Nicolas

Helena Paparizou singles chronology
"Angel" (2015)	"Misi Kardia" (2016)	"Fiesta" (2016)

"Misi Kardia", a Rock ballad, is a Greek song by Helena Paparizou. It was exclusively impacted on Dromos Fm 89,8 fm for Athens ando n Cosmoradio 95,1 fm for Thessaloniki on February 8 and later official released on February 15 as a digital single along the music video on Vevo. The song was written by Chris Mazz, Andy Nicolas & Giannis Doxas. It is the second official single from her sixth Greek studio album Ouranio Toxo which was released on December 15, 2017

== Music video ==
The music video premiered on VEVO on February 15. The video was directed by Sherif Francis.

== Charts ==
Chart (2016)	Peak position
Greek iTunes Chart	1
Greek Airplay Chart	25

== Release history ==
Region	Date	Label	Format
Greece	15 February 2016	EMI Music Greece	Digital, Radio
