= Survivor (Helena Paparizou song) =

Single by Helena Paparizou

from the album One Life
- Released: February 23, 2014
- Recorded: 2013; Sweden
- Genre: Pop rock
- Length: 3:04
- Label: Lionheart Music Group
- Songwriters: Bobby Ljunggren; Henrik Wikström; Karl-Ola Kjellholm; Sharon Vaughn

Helena Paparizou singles chronology
"Den Thelo Allon Iroa" (2013)	"Survivor" (2014)	"Don't Hold Back On Love" (2014)

"Survivor" is a song recorded by Swedish Greek singer-songwriter Helena Paparizou. The song was released on February 23, 2014 as the second single from Paparizou's third English-language album, One Life (2014). It is also available in first disc of the Melodifestivalen 2014 album. The song was written by Bobby Ljunggren, Henrik Wikström, Karl-Ola Kjellholm and Sharon Vaughn. It participated in the Melodifestivalen 2014 where it came fourth in the final behind Alcazar, Ace Wilder and the winner, Sanna Nielsen.

"Survivor" is a mid-tempo pop rock song that discusses a relationship, a break-up and how she got over it. The song peaked at number 18 on the Sverigetopplistan top 60 singles and at number 6 on the DigiListan top 60 singles. The song received mostly critical acclaim by critics that reviewed songs from Melodifestivalen 2014, who complimented both the lyrical and musical content as well as the song's performance.

Even though most of the songs from One Life are English versions of tracks from Paparizou's fifth Greek-language album Ti Ora Tha Vgoume?, "Survivor" is one of the songs that the version of the album is the first and only version. "Survivor" is also her second single release in Sweden after her seven years absence from the Swedish industry, following the first single of the album "Save Me (This Is An SOS)" and preceding the third single of the album "Don't Hold Back on Love".

== Background and release ==
Paparizou was rumored as a participant of Melodifestivalen 2014 in November, along with Yohio, who participated in the Melodifestivalen 2013. However, after a confusion, some of the Greek media reported that Paparizou would be actually internally selected to represent Sweden in the Eurovision Song Contest 2014. On November 26, 2013, it was officially announced by Sveriges Television that Paparizou will compete in the selection. After the press conference held on November 26, 2013 for the presentation of the Melodifestivalen acts, Paparizou gave an interview about her song and her participation in the Melodifestivalen. She reportedly said "I had told I would never think of participating and doing this all again. But you never know what will happen in the future. And I'm here today". The song was written by Bobby Ljunggren, Henrik Wikström, Karl-Ola Kjellholm and Sharon Vaughn and the lyrics of the song were first seen on January 29, 2014, just three days before the first semi-final of Melodifestivalen. A preview of the song, along with the other seven entries of the semi-final, was revealed on January 30, 2014.

I said I would never think of participating and doing this all again. But you never know what will happen in the future. And here I am today
—Paparizou talking about her participation

At a talk show on Alpha Channel, Paparizou said that once she heard the song, she thought that she was already at the Eurovision Song Contest, meaning that the song is good enough to win the selection. The song was available for purchase in iTunes, WiMP and Spotify since February 22, 2014. During an interview for Esctoday, Paparizou revealed that the song was not originally written for her. She said that she heard the instrumental of the song in the recording studios and that she asked if she could have it in her album with the producers saying that the song is written for Melodifestivalen and that the artist of the song being undecided. Paparizou then, said that she would like to participate in the Melodifestivalen with the song.

== Composition and development ==
"Survivor"
A 21-second sample taken from the track's chorus.

"Survivor" is a mid-tempo song about empowerment which runs for three minutes and four seconds. Written by Bobby Ljunggren, Henrik Wikström, Karl-Ola Kjellholm and Sharon Vaughn, the song talks about a woman that was abandoned by a man, but yet has managed to get through the situation and survive.

The song was originally written to be submitted for Melodifestivalen 2014. As the singer of the song was not decided by the time of the selection's submissions, the song was recorded with a sample voice. As Paparizou reported, after she heard the song in the studios with the pre-recorded voice she begged the composers to record it for her new album as she really got inspired by the song. Then, the composers said that the song is for Melodifestivalen and it cannot be included in her album leading Paparizou to participate in Melodifestivalen.

Sharon, as Paparizou reported, wrote the lyrics of the song because "she's been there and she is a survivor" like Paparizou. The song contains some inspirational rhetoric about overcoming difficulties, which Helena has definitely done. The song's empowerment and rock edge was often compared with "Euphoria", the song that brought the fifth victory of Sweden in the Eurovision Song Contest, making "Survivor" a potential Eurovision winner in case it was selected to represent Sweden in the contest.

== Critical reception ==
The song received mostly positive reviews. On a review for the Melodifestivalen songs, Olivier Rocher of Oikotimes described the song as "a glamorous entry that definitely deserves to be listened til the end to see how powerful it can get". The song was also described as "a fairly standard-issue Schlager power anthem, built around a title more than a strong lyrical idea". Gaybladet's Robin Strandberg gave the song a rather positive review and said that the song is good enough not only for Melodifestivalen but for Europe also. Billy Xifaras of Wiwibloggs described it as "a fantastic ballad infused with a rock edge". He also said that it has perfect lyrics, backdrop and appearance and that it could give Helena her second win at the Eurovision Song Contest.

With eight reviews from Wiwibloggs, "Survivor" received an average score of 8.48 out of 10, the best score of the Melodifestivalen final, followed by "Undo" of Sanna Nielsen. It was often described as a strong song with an outstanding performance by Paparizou; Franceska gave the song a rate of 10 out of 10 and said that "She [Helena] dominates the vocals and the chorus is amazing", Angus gave it a 9.75 out of 10 rate and compared it with the selection's favorite, "Undo", saying that "Survivor" is much stronger than "Undo". Padraig, who said that "Survivor" is much better than her Eurovision-winning song, "My Number One", gave the song a rate of 9 out of 10 while Zach gave it a rate of 9.5 out of 10 and described the song as "catchy, probably the catchiest in the whole final" and also said that "the song leaves an impact, and frankly, I like it more than her Eurovision songs". Deban gave the lowest rate for the song by giving it 2.5 out of 10 and said that the song is "one of the most auto-tuned performances in Melodifestivalen". Anthony gave it 8 out of 10 and said that the song is "a far cry from the My Number One". James said that the song is "an instant vote winner for Eurovision viewers who like a queen" and gave it a 7 out of 10 rate. Patrick and Ramadan gave the song a rate of 10 out of 10, being the last of the three reviewers to do so. Lastly, Sami gave the song 9 out of 10 and said that she was disappointed when she heard "Survivor" but after the Andra chansen, she changed mind. She also said that she loves the new style of Elena and that the performance is beautiful and powerful.

The performance also received positive reviews with The Local's David Jørgensen saying that "[Helena] had the strongest performance given that she's probably had the most practice". Scandipop said about both the song and its performance that it "was in a different league last night. [Survivor] was even better than anything in last year's whole contest".

Gaining an overall score of 8 out of 10, "Survivor" was positively received by the reviewers of Popcorker. Jasper gave the song 10 out of 10 and described the song as "a smart pop song that has a big chorus that gets in my head immediately". Katja gave the song 9 out of 10 and said that it's very "girl power" on its lyrical sense, compared it to the era of Christina Aguilera's album, Stripped (2008) and also said that it could be song performed by Charlotte Perrelli or Maja Keuc. Andy said that the song has not a "killer choruse" and that its verses are a little underwhelming and gave the song 7 out of 10. Uli gave the song the lowest rate – 3 out of 10 – and said that "Survivor" is not good enough for Eurovision stage. David gave it 9 out of 10 and said that it would become an instant number one if Shakira or Rihanna had released it. Lastly, Dimitri gave the song 8.5 out of 10 and described the song as "a dramatic ballad" and said that while the song itself is not really the best, it's without a doubt "as Eurovision as it can get".

== Melodifestivalen ==
"Survivor" was drawn to participate in the first semi-final of the selection which took place in Malmö's Malmö Arena on February 1, 2014. The previews of "Survivor" and the other seven songs of the semi-final were published on January 30, 2014, with the rehearsals of the semi-final taking place the same day.

The song was performed eighth at the first semi-final. The song didn't reach the first two places and therefore didn't directly qualify for the final. However, as it took one of the following two places, it qualified for the Andra chansen (Second chance). The second chance took place on March 1, 2014 in Sparbanken Lidköping Arena, Lidköping, where Paparizou was drawn to perform seventh. "Survivor" was placed in the top 4 and therefore qualified for the duels where it competed against Outrigger's "Echo". The song won the battle and qualified for the final along with the second battle's winner, Linus Svenning. Right after the second chance, the running order of the final was revealed with "Survivor" being performed at the sixth place. "Survivor" came fourth in the final with a total of 84 points; it received 57 points from the international jury and 27 points from the Swedish public.

On March 11, 2014, the full results of the selection were published. In the first semi-final, the song came in the 3rd place with a total of 70,438 points; 32,141 in the first round and 38,297 in the second round. In the second chance it received 47,161 points in the first round and 44,411 in the second round with a total of 91,572 points making it to the 2nd place. It competed in the first duel against Outrigger's "Echo" and collected 123,859 votes, over 70,000 votes more than "Echo". In the final, "Survivor" gathered 57 points from the international jury. The song 67,366 votes, 5.6% of the public vote, later given as 27 points.

"Survivor" was placed second in the betting odds for the first semi-final and fourth in the betting odds for winning, just a few hours before the semi-final. Just a few days before the second chance, Paparizou along with J.E.M were the favorites for qualifying for the final. According to a poll on Wiwibloggs, "Survivor" was the favorite to win by the public with 835 votes followed by Anton Ewald with 645 votes. A few hours before the final, "Survivor" was third in the betting odds for winning the selection, following the first and second placed Sanna Nielsen and Ace Wilder. After coming fourth in the final of Melodifestivalen, Paparizou said to Oikotimes: "I'm very satisfied with my fourth place because I haven't been releasing songs in Sweden for over seven years so this is more than enough, I'm thrilled and I'm very very happy."

In May 2014, it was revealed that it was selected by the Swedish OGAE club to participate in the OGAE Second Chance Contest 2014. This was the second time Paparizou participated in the contest after taking part in the 2005 Contest for Greece. On October 20, 2014, Survivor won the contest with 259 points, six points head the runner-up, Spain.

== Promotion ==
"Survivor" was mainly promoted through Paparizou's participation in Melodifestivalen. It was performed in the shows of Melodifestivalen and twice as an acoustic version. In Greece, she gave several interviews about her participation in the Melodifestivalen including her interview in the talk shows Eleni of Alpha and Proino Mou of Mega. She also had an interview which was featured on the Greek newspaper Proto Thema at the issue of December 1, 2013.

In January, Helena started her appearances on Sweden as she started preparations for her Melodifestivalen participation. Interviews on the Swedish media included the game show Så ska det låta and interview at MorronZoo of the radio station Rix FM. After the first semi-final of Melodifestivalen, Paparizou had an interview on the February issue of the Greek magazine Big Fish and talked about the career in Sweden and her attempt on representing Sweden in the Eurovision Song Contest.

=== Live performances ===
"Survivor" was performed for the first time on February 1, 2014 in the Malmö Arena of Malmö on the first semi-final of the 2014 Melodifestivalen and since she didn't qualify directly for the final she had to perform it on the second chance. Just one day before the second chance, she performed an acoustic version of the song. On March 1, 2014, the song was performed in the Sparbanken Lidköping Arena of Lidköping on the selection's second chance being the second time Paparizou performed the song in the selection where she qualified. In the Friends Arena of Stockholm, Paparizou performed the song for the third and last time on the selection.

Making her fifth performance of the song in Sweden, Paparizou performed an acoustic version of the song on TV4's talk show, Efter tio hosted by Malou von Sivers. Upon the release of her third English-language studio album, Paparizou visited the Gallerian Eskilstuna on March 29, 2014 for album signing and live performances of the songs from the album including "Survivor". On March 30, 2014, she appeared at the morning news and talk show of TV4, Nyhetsmorgon, where she performed "Survivor" among other songs from her album. Paparizou performed the song at the talk show of SVT1, Go'kväll on April 5, 2014.

== Track listing ==
- CD single
1. Survivor – 3:04
2. Survivor (Instrumental version) – 3:04

== Credits and personnel ==
- Karl-Ola S. Kjellholm – writing
- Bobby Ljunggren – writing
- Sharon Vaughn – writing
- Elena Paparizou – vocals
- Henrik Wikström – writing

Credits adapted from the liner notes of One Life.

== Chart performance ==
Though the song did not enter the official single charts on its release, it entered both the Greek and Swedish iTunes charts peaking at the 4th and 3rd place respectively. It firstly entered the top sixty of the Swedish DigiListan on the 19th place and it later peaked at the 6th place. On March 7, 2014, it entered the official Swedish digital charts, Sverigetopplistan on the 33rd place and climbed up to the 18th place a week later. Three weeks later, it fell down to the 53rd place and it got out of the top 60 on the following week.

=== Weekly charts ===
Chart (2014)	Peak position
Sweden (Digilistan)	6
Sweden (Sverigetopplistan)	18

== Release history ==
Country	Date	Format	Label
Sweden	February 23, 2014	Digital download	Lionheart; Universal
Greece	February 23, 2014	Digital download	Lionheart; Universal
United Kingdom	February 23, 2014	Digital download	Lionheart; Universal
