= Haide (song) =

2017 song recorded by Elena Paparizou

"Haide" is a 2017 song written by Phoebus and recorded by Greek singer Elena Paparizou from her album Ouranio Toxo.

== Charts ==
Chart (2017)	Peak position
Greece (Digital Single Chart)	1
Bulgaria (PROPHON)	1
Cyprus (Airplay Chart)	1
