= Fiesta (Helena Paparizou song) =

2016 single by Helena Paparizou

Single by Helena Paparizou

from the album Ouranio Toxo
- Released: 4 July 2016
- Recorded: June 2016
- Genre: Dance-pop
- Length: 3:04
- Label: EMI Music Greece
- Songwriters: Michael Tsaousopoulos, Teo Tzimas and Dimitris Beris
- Producers: Michael Tsaousopoulos, Teo Tzimas

Helena Paparizou singles chronology
"Misi Kardia" (2016)	"Fiesta" (2016)	"Agkaliase Me" (2016)

"Fiesta" (English: "Party") is a Greek Pop song by Helena Paparizou. The song was exclusively released on Dromos FM 89,8 (Athens), Cosmoradio 95,1 (Thessaloniki) on June 27, and was officially released on July 4 on Vevo. It is the third single from her sixth Greek studio album Ouranio Toxo which released on December 15, 2017.

The song is written by Michael Tsaousopoulos, Teo Tzimas and Dimitris Beris. The English version released on July 15 on her vevo channel. Lyrics are written by Nektarios Tyrakis. Paparizou performed "Fiesta" for the first time at the annual MAD Video Music Awards held in Tae Kwon Do Stadium in Athens on the 28th June 2016. On July 1, Paparizou performed "Fiesta" at the semi-finals of The X Factor (Greek series 4).

== Charts ==
Chart (2016)	Peak position
Greek Airplay Chart	1

== Release history ==
=== Greek Version ===
Region	Date	Label	Format
Greece	4 July 2016	EMI Music Greece	Digital, Radio

=== English Version ===
Region	Date	Label	Format
Greece	15 July 2016	EMI Music Greece	Digital, Radio
Sweden	26 August 2016	Capitol Music Group Sweden	Digital, Radio
