= Ouranio Toxo =

Ouranio Toxo (Greek: Ουράνιο Τόξο 'rainbow') may refer to:

- Rainbow (Greece), a political party
- Ouranio Toxo (album), by Helena Paparizou, 2017
