= Angel (Helena Paparizou song) =

Single by Helena Paparizou

from the album Ouranio Toxo
- Released: 24 April 2015
- Recorded: 2015
- Genre: Power Ballad
- Length: 3:05
- Label: Lionheart
- Songwriter(s): Amir Aly, Henrik Wikström, Bobby Ljunggren, Sharon Vaughn (English Lyrics)
- Producer(s): Amir Aly, Henrik Wikström

Helena Paparizou singles chronology
"Otan Aggeli Klene" (2015)	"Angel" (2015)	"Misi Kardia" (2016)

"Angel" is an up-tempo ballad in English sung by Helena Paparizou. It is the first Swedish single release after the 2014 single Don't Hold Back On Love. The original song was written by Amir Aly, Henrik Wikström, Bobby Ljunggren and Sharon Vaughn. It is included on the album Ouranio Toxo. The song was released in Sweden digitally on iTunes & Vevo on April 24 by Lionheart.

== Charts ==
Chart (2015)	Peak position
Swedish Airplay Chart	8

== Track listing ==
01. Angel – 03:04

02. Angel (Singback Version) – 03:04

== Release history ==
Region	Date	Label	Format
Sweden	24 April 2015	Lionheart	Digital, Radio
Greece	29 April 2015	Minos EMI	Digital, Radio
