= Number One (video) =

Video by Helena Paparizou
- Released: April 26, 2005
- Recorded: 2004–2005
- Genre: Pop, Dance
- Label: Sony BMG Greece/Columbia

Helena Paparizou chronology
Number One (2005)	Mad Secret Concerts (2007)

Number One is the first DVD video release by Greek singer Helena Paparizou. It is a collection of all her music videos from the beginning of her solo career along with some extra videos. It was released one month before the final of Eurovision Song Contest 2005 where Paparizou won first place.

== Album Features ==
1. "My Number One"
2. "Antithesis"
3. "Katse Kala"
4. "Treli Kardia"
5. "Anapantites Klisis"
6. "Stin Kardia Mou Mono Thlipsi"
7. "Anapantities Klisis (Mad Version)" (duet with Christos Dantis)

== Extra Features ==
1. "Tribute To Sweden with Christos Nezos"
2. "Photo Gallery"

== Release history ==
Region	Date	Label	Format
Greece	March 24, 2005	Sony BMG, Columbia	DVD
Cyprus		Sony BMG, Columbia	DVD
Europe	May 19, 2005	Sony BMG	DVD

== Charts ==
Chart	Providers	Peak position	Weeks On Charts	Certification	Sales
Greek DVD Chart	IFPI	1	35		
Cypriot Album Chart	All Records Top 20	1	20		
