= MAD Secret Concerts: Helena Paparizou =

Mad Secret Concerts

Video by Helena Paparizou
- Released: July 22, 2006
- Recorded: December 13, 2005; Iera Odos, Athens, Greece
- Genre: Pop, Pop rock
- Label: Sony BMG Greece/RCA
- Producer: Cinegram, Manolis Tzirakis, Kostas Kalimeris

Helena Paparizou chronology
| Number One (2005) | Mad Secret Concerts (2006) | Live In Concert (2008) |

Singles from Mad Secret Concerts
- 1. "Just Walk Away" Released: May 20, 2007

Mad Secret Concerts: Helena Paparizou is the second DVD video release by Greek pop singer, Helena Paparizou. It was recorded on December 13, 2005 as part of the television specials MAD Secret Concerts by MAD TV at the Iera Odos club, in Athens, Greece, and released on July 22, 2006 in Greece and Cyprus by Sony BMG Greece.

The first radio single released from the album was "Just Walk Away", which received a lot of radio success. The video premiered on May 20 on MAD TV.

== DVD features ==
1. "Smooth Operator" (Sade)
2. "Crazy" (Seal)
3. "Outside" (George Michael)
4. "Suddenly" (Billy Ocean)
5. "Sweet Dreams (Are Made of This)" (Eurythmics)
6. "Just Walk Away" (Celine Dion)
7. "You Set My Heart on Fire" (Tina Charles)
8. "Can't Help Falling In Love" (Elvis Presley)
9. "The Light in Our Soul"
10. "Why" (Antique)
11. "That's the Way It Is" (Celine Dion)
12. "Don't Speak" (No Doubt)
13. "Like A Prayer" (Madonna)
14. "Imagine" (John Lennon)

== Release history ==
| Region | Date | Label | Format |
|---|---|---|---|
| Greece | July 22, 2006 | Sony BMG Greece, RCA | DVD |
| Cyprus | July 22, 2006 | Sony BMG Greece, RCA | DVD |

== Charts ==
| Chart | Providers | Peak position | Weeks On Charts | Certification | Sales |
|---|---|---|---|---|---|
| Greek DVD Chart | IFPI | 1 | 30 | | |
| Cypriot Album Chart | All Records Top 20 | 1 | 10 | | |
