= One Life (Helena Paparizou album) =

Studio album by Helena Paparizou
- Released: 26 March 2014
- Recorded: March 2012–October 2013
- Genre: Dance-pop
- Length: 41:27
- Language: English
- Label: Lionheart Music Group

Helena Paparizou chronology
Ti Ora Tha Vgoume? (2013)	One Life (2014)	Ouranio Toxo (2017)

Singles from One Life
- 1. "Save Me (This Is An SOS)" Released: 29 May 2013; 2. "Survivor" Released: 22 February 2014; 3. "Don't Hold Back On Love" Released: 1 May 2014

One Life is the third English-language studio album and eighth overall album by Greek-Swedish singer Helena Paparizou. It was released on 26 March 2014 through Lionheart Music Group and Universal Music. Its twelve tracks are a mix of new songs and English-language versions of songs from Paparizou's Greek-language album Ti Ora Tha Vgoume (2013). On 15 April 2014 the album was released through EMI Music in Greece.

== Recording and production ==
In 2013, Clavicord studios posted some photos on Facebook showing Helena in the studio session with her Greek producer Giannis Doxas. After the summer period Helena Paparizou's forum revealed more details on this album. For example, some of the possible producers/songwriters are Jimmy Jansson, Fredrik Sonefors, Bobby Ljunggren, Micah Wilshire, Oscar Holter, Jakob “Jakke” Erixson, Kristofer Östergren, Gabriel Russel, Nalle Ahlstedt, Petri Somer, Nicole Fuentes, Pasi Siitonen, Risto Asikainen, her0ism and Nikos Antypas.

== Release and promotion ==
The album was released on 26 March 2014. It is being administered by Universal International Music, a Netherlands-based office of Universal Music Group, per Paparizou's latest multi-territory deal. As a result, the album carries the "Universal Music" logo and Swedish label which is Lionheart Music Group. On 29 May, Paparizou released the lead single of the album, "Save Me (This Is An SOS)" which was promoted in various Swedish events and TV shows. In September, Paparizou sang a sample from a new song titled "Just One More Night" the English version of her Greek song "Den Tha Kimithis Apopse", at the MAD North Stage Festival by TIF Helexpo, in Thessaloniki. On 15 April 2014 the album was released through Minos - EMI in Greece.

== Singles ==
"Save Me (This Is An SOS)"

"Save Me (This Is An SOS)" was released as the lead single at radio stations in both Greece and Sweden on 29 May. Music blog Idolator gave a positive review, saying the production shares similarities with hit songs by the likes of Shakira and Jennifer Lopez. Paparizou performed a mashup of "Save Me" and "Freed From Desire" by Gala at the annual Mad Video Music Awards. The song, along with the greek version "Sou Stelno SOS" peaked at #5 at the greek international airplay chart, and at #13 at the official combined airplay chart.

"Survivor"

"Survivor" is the second single released from the album. It was Paparizou's entry in Sweden's Melodifestivalen 2014, which placed 4th in the final on March 8th. The track was released on iTunes and Spotify on 22 February and was later certified Gold.

"Don't Hold Back On Love"

"Don't Hold Back On Love" is the third official and final single from the album. Paparizou performed that song for the first time at the semi-final of The Voice of Greece. The music video was released in July 30, directed by Alexandros Grammatopoulos.

== Track listing ==
No.	Title	Writer(s)	Producer(s)	Length
1.	"Save Me (This Is An SOS)"	Jansson, Ljunggren, Wilshire	Jansson, Sonefors	3:08
2.	"Survivor"	Bobby Ljunggren, Henrik Wikström, Karl-Ola Kjellholm, Sharon Vaughn	Henrik Wikström, Karl-Ola Kjellholm	3:03
3.	"As Long As You Are Mine" (Mi Mou Exigis)	Nikos Antipas, Nikos Moraitis		4:05
4.	"Set Your Heart On Me" (Soma Ke Psihi)	Jansson, Ljunggren	Jansson, Sonefors	3:06
5.	"One Life" (Mesimeria)	Pasi Siitonen, Risto Asikainen, her0ism		3:35
6.	"4 Another 1"	Isabelle Moulin, Jimmy Jansson	Jimmy Jansson	3:18
7.	"Don't Hold Back On Love"	Jimmy Jansson, Micah Wilshire		3:06
8.	"Enough" (duet with Jill Johnson)	Aaron Scherz, Emily Shackelton, Kelly Archer		4:01
9.	"The Groove Is The Solution"	Gabriel Russel	Karl-Ola S. Kjellholm	3:51
10.	"Crazy For Love" (Vrehi Filia)	Nalle Ahlstedt, Petri Somer, Nicole Fuentes	Ahlstedt	3:19
11.	"Chainsaw" (Ti Ora Tha Vgoume?)	Oscar Holter, Jakob “Jakke” Erixson, Kristofer Östergren	Hotler/Erixson	3:37
12.	"One More Night" (De Tha Kimithis Apopse)	Nikos Antipas, Nikos Moraitis		3:13

== Charts ==
Chart	Peak position
Greek Albums Chart	3
Cyprus Charts	2
Swedish Albums Chart	11
