= Apohrosis =

Studio album by Helena Paparizou
- Released: 29 January 2021
- Recorded: April 2019 – September 2020
- Studio: Bi-Kay Studio
- Genre: Laïko-pop; pop rock
- Length: 46:30
- Label: Minos EMI
- Producer: Helena Paparizou; Nektarios Kokkinos

Helena Paparizou chronology
Ouranio Toxo (2017)	Apohrosis (2021)

Singles from Apohrosis
- 1. "Kati Skoteino" Released: 15 October 2018; 2. "Askopa Xenihtia" Released: 26 March 2019; 3. "Etsi Ine I Fasi" Released: 24 February 2020; 4. "Mila Mou" Released: 25 May 2020; 5. "Se Xeno Soma" Released: 18 September 2020; 6. "Deja Vu" Released: 18 December 2020; 7. "Gia Pia Agapi" Released: 7 May 2021; 8. "Mia Stagona Amartia" Released: 10 September 2021; 9. "Mi" Released: 20 January 2022

Apohrosis (Greek: Αποχρώσεις; English: Shades) is the seventh Greek-language studio album and tenth overall studio album by Greek singer Helena Paparizou, released on 29 January 2021, in Greece and Cyprus by EMI Music Greece.

== Background ==
In December 2018 Helena Paparizou in Tilerama magazine interview stated that she is preparing her new Greek album which will be produced by ARCADE. On 14 July 2020 Helena went online on her Instagram account and announced that her new album is called Apohrosis and is going to be release in autumn, however in autumn a delay was announced by artist herself. On 15 January 2021 official release date and album cover were revealed on Helenas official Instagram account. Few days later it was revealed that the cause for album delay was Project Apohrosis - all of the album tracks are going to have a music video that are going to be posted on artist's official YouTube channel. It is the first Helenas album in which every song has a music video and also second completely Greek languaged album after her debut solo album Protereotita.

== Track listing ==
No.	Title	Lyrics	Music	Length
1.	"Adiexodo" (Αδιέξοδο; Deadlock)	ARCADE; Babis Samis	ARCADE; Babis Samis	3:34
2.	"Se Xeno Soma" (Σε Ξένο Σώμα; In a Foreign Body)	ARCADE; Rene	ARCADE; Pantelis "Padé" Loupasakis	3:35
3.	"Apohrosis" (Αποχρώσεις; Shades)	ARCADE	ARCADE	3:03
4.	"Mi" (Μη; Do Not)	ARCADE	ARCADE; Bosorg Etemad; Damian Magand; Kirsten Collins	2:55
5.	"Gia Poia Agapi" (Για Ποια Αγάπη; For Which Love)	ARCADE	ARCADE	3:26
6.	"Askopa Xenihtia" (Άσκοπα Ξενύχτια; Unnecessary Midnights)	ARCADE; Dimitris Xipolias	ARCADE; Dimitris Xipolias	4:02
7.	"Mia Stagona Amartia" (Μια Σταγόνα Αμαρτία; A Drop of Sin)	Niki Papatheohari	ARCADE	4:05
8.	"Etsi Einai I Fasi (Featuring Sakis Rouvas)" (Έτσι Είναι Η Φάση; This is the Phase)	Giannis Hristodoulopoulos	Giannis Hristodoulopoulos	3:22
9.	"Kati Skoteino" (Κάτι Σκοτεινό; Something Dark)	ARCADE	ARCADE	4:02
10.	"Mila Mou" (Μίλα Μου; Talk To Me)	Helena Paparizou; Keepitpure	Helena Paparizou; Kim Diamantopoulos	3:05
11.	"Deja Vu (Featuring Marseaux)"	ARCADE; Solmeister	ARCADE	3:09
12.	"Den Epistrepsa" (Δεν Επέστρεψα; I Didn't Return)	Vangelis Konstantinidis	Dimitris Xipolias	3:23
13.	"Anamoni" (Αναμονή; Waiting)	ARCADE	ARCADE	4:49
Total length:				46:30

== Music videos ==
"Kati Skoteino"

The first single of the album was released on October 15, 2018. The director of the video clip is Alex Konstantinidis.

"Askopa Xenihtia"

The second single of the album was released on March 26, 2019. The director of the video clip was again Alex Konstantinidis.

"Etsi Einai I Fasi"

The video for the song was presented on February 24, 2020. The director of the video clip was Yannis Papadakos.

"Mila Mou"

The video for the song was released on May 25, 2020. The director of the video clip was again Yannis Papadakos.

"Se Xeno Soma"

The song was released on September 15, 2020. The video clip for the song was shot by Yannis Michelopoulos.

"#ProjectApohrosis"

The other eight songs from the album also have videos recorded. They are presented during the period from January 25 to February 25, 2021. The directing of the videos was entrusted to Vangelis Tsaousopoulos.
- "Deja Vu" The video for the song was released on January 25, 2021.
- "Anamoni" The video for the song was released on February 4, 2021.
- "Den Epestrepsa" The video for the song was released on February 8, 2021.
- "Mia Stagona Amartia" The video for the song was released on February 11, 2021.
- "Gia Pia Agapi" The video for the song was released on February 15, 2021.
- "Mi" The video for the song was released on February 18, 2021.
- "Apohrosis" The video for the song was released on February 22, 2021.
- "Adiexodo" The video for the song was released on February 25, 2021.

== Release history ==
Region	Date	Label	Format	Version
Greece	29 January 2021	Minos EMI	CD, digital download	Original
Cyprus	29 January 2021	Minos EMI	CD, digital download	Original

== Charts ==
Chart	Providers	Peak</>position	Certification
Greek Albums Chart	IFPI	1	—

https://www.ifpi.gr/charts_el.html

== Credits and personnel ==
Credits adapted from the album's liner notes.

Musicians

- Helena Paparizou – vocals (all tracks)
- Sakis Rouvas – vocals (8)
- Gabyvox – backing vocals (11)
- Gavriyl Gavriylidis – backing vocals (1, 3, 4, 5, 6, 7, 12) , guitar (6, 11)
- Giannis Hristodoulopoulos – backing vocals (8)
- Hristina Kaloniti – backing vocals (11)
- Apostolis Mallias – bagpipes (gaida) (6)
- Nikos Saleas – clarinet (2)
- Hass – guitar (9)
- Sokratis Mastrodimos – guitar (10)
- Kostas Kefalas – trumpet (10)
- Dimitris Bournis – violin (5)

Technical

- Kim Diamantopoulos – arranged (10)
- Giannis Hristodoulopoulos – arranged, programming (8)
- Giorgos Gaitanos – arranged string (13)
- Dimitris Iraris – arranged string (13)
- ARCADE – mixing, arranged (1, 2, 3, 4, 5, 6, 7, 9 ,11, 12, 13)
- Kiriakos Asteriou – programming, keyboards (all tracks)

Design

- Aris Georgiadis – art direction
- Dimitris Panagiotakopoulos – design, artwork
- Panos Giannakopoulos – photography
- Aris Georgiadis – styling
- Elsa Protopsalti – make-up
- Nasos Asimakopoulos – hair
