= Poso M'Aresei =

Single by Helena Paparizou

from the album Ti Ora Tha Vgoume?
- Released: 19 March 2013
- Recorded: 2012
- Genre: Pop
- Length: 3:31 ,(Remix by Lunatic) 3:25
- Label: EMI Music Greece
- Songwriter: METH (Stavento)
- Producer: METH (Stavento)

Helena Paparizou singles chronology
| "Lathos Agapes" (2012) | "Poso M'Aresei" (2013) | "Ena Lepto" (2013) |

"Poso M'Aresei" (Greek: Πόσο μ' αρέσει; English: How much I like) is a pop song by the Greek-Swedish singer Helena Paparizou. The song's title was announced some days before and on 19 March 2013 released in many Greek radios (Cosmoradio, Rythmos) as the first Greek single after 3 years. On 17 April, Helena performed the remix of the song by Lunatic at Madwalk 2013.

== Release and promotion ==
Poso M'Aresi was released at Paparizou's new official channel at YouTube on 19 March 2013. Paparizou performed the song at MadWalk 2013 in a remix by Greek producer George Tsomokos (Lunatic), as well as her second single "Ena Lepto".

== Music video ==
The official music video was released on 15 April, the same day her label released her new single "Ena Lepto" and the official remix of "Poso M'Aresi". A photo from the clip was published in Elena's Facebook page, with the official upload been posted after some minutes. The video clip shows a day from the life of girls in a brothel, undefined time, beginning with a general view in a room. During its first day of air, the music video received positive reviews with mixed comments about the sexy context of the clip. The next day the video was deleted, and reuploaded a day after in high definition at EMI's official YouTube account. The same day, YouTube deleted the video due to explicit content concerns.

== Charts ==
| Chart | Peak position |
|---|---|
| Greek Airplay Chart | 3 |
