= Ena Lepto =

Single by Helena Paparizou

from the album Ti Ora Tha Vgoume?
- Released: 16 May 2013
- Recorded: 2013
- Genre: Pop
- Length: 3:07
- Label: EMI Music Greece
- Songwriters: Giorgos Papadopoulos, Akis Petrou
- Producer: Leonidas Tzitzos

Helena Paparizou singles chronology
"Poso M'Aresei" (2013)	"Ena Lepto" (2013)	"Save Me (This Is An SOS)" (2013)

"Ena Lepto" (Greek: Ένα Λεπτό; English: One Minute) is an uptempo ballad by Greek-Swedish singer Helena Paparizou and is the second single of the new album Ti Ora Tha Vgoume?. The song is written by singer-songwriter Giorgos Papadopoulos and Akis Petrou and produced by Leonidas Tzitzos.

== Release and promo ==
Ena Lepto was released via EMI Greece's YouTube channel on 19 April 2013. Paparizou performed the song at MadWalk 2013.
