= Save Me (This Is an SOS) =

"Save Me (This Is An SOS)"

Single by Helena Paparizou

from the album Ti Ora Tha Vgoume? and One Life
- Released: 29 May 2013
- Recorded: 2013
- Genre: Dance-pop
- Length: 3:08
- Label: Lionheart Music Group, EMI Music Greece
- Songwriters: Jimmy Jansson, Bobby Ljunggren, Mycah Wilshire, Yiannis Doxas (Greek version)
- Producers: Jimmy Jansson, Fredrik Sonefors

Helena Paparizou singles chronology
"Ena Lepto" (2013)	"Save Me (This Is An SOS)" (2013)	"Den Thelo Allon Iroa" (2013)

"Save Me (This Is An SOS)" is an English song released on 29 May in Sweden by Lionheart Music Group. Save Me" is the third single from Helena Paparizou's seventh album Ti Ora Tha Vgoume?. However, "Save Me" is the lead single from the third English-language album titled One Life which was released on 26 March 2014. In the album, there is also the Greek version of the song titled "Sou Stelno SOS".

== Release and Promo ==
The song premiered on Swedish national radio station P4 in mid-May and on 29th of the same month it premieres on Swedish iTunes. On 30 May the song premiered in all Greek radios by EMI. Paparizou performed "Save Me" in a mashup version along with Gala's "Freed From Desire" at the annual [Mad Video Music Awards]. As for the promotion of the single, Paparizou had "Save Me (This Is An SOS)" at the setlist of her summer concerts, along with four dancers.

Talking about the Swedish market, she performed the song at Lotta Pa Liseberg on June 17, as well as at the Stockholm Pride, Nickelodeondagen on August 1 and Bingolotto on October 27.

== Charts ==
Chart	Peak position
Greek Airplay Chart	4
Swedish Dance Chart	25
