= Ti Ora Tha Vgoume? =

Studio album by Helena Paparizou
- Released: 3 June 2013
- Recorded: August 2012–April 2013
- Genre: Dance, Pop, Laïko
- Length: 51:28
- Language: Greek, English
- Label: EMI Music Greece
- Producer: The A Team

Helena Paparizou chronology
Greatest Hits & More (2011)	Ti Ora Tha Vgoume? (2013)	One Life (2014)

Ti Ora Tha Vgoume? (Booklet cover)

Singles from Ti Ora Tha Vgoume?
- 1. "Poso M'Aresei" Released: 19 March 2013; 2. "Ena Lepto" Released: 14 April 2013; 3. "Save Me (This Is An SOS) / Sou Stelno SOS" Released: 29 May 2013; 4. "Den Thelo Allon Iroa" Released: 24 December 2013

Ti Ora Tha Vgoume? (Greek: Τι ώρα θα βγούμε; English: What time will we go out?) is the fifth Greek-language studio album and seventh studio album overall by Greek singer Helena Paparizou, released on 3 June 2013 in Greece and Cyprus by EMI Music Greece.

The album marks Paparizou's first studio album release with EMI Greece, following her departure from longtime label Sony Music Greece.

== Recording and production ==
Elena Paparizou began studio recordings around July 2012 in Athens. Giannis Doxas, Paparizou's former A&R, actively promoted the project through his personal social networking sites, despite his employment at Paparizou's former label. Songwriters and producers of the new album are Meth (Mihalis Kouinelis/Stavento), Giorgos Papadopoulos, Akis Petrou, Jimmy Jansson, Fredrik Sonefors, Bobby Ljunggren, Dimitris Kontopoulos, Nikos Antypas, Nikos Moraitis, Miltos Ioannidis, Gabriel Russel (Slik Beats), Giorgos Pilianidis, O. Holter, Jakke Erixson, Kristofer Östergren, Youla Georgiou, Nahle Ahlstedt and Giannis Doxas. The liner notes indicate that the album is collectively produced by "The A Team".

In mid of April 2013, Elena Paparizou's official Facebook page posted two photos from the album's photo shoot, which see Paparizou in a garden wearing a white button-down shirt, short light blue denim shorts, male black cowboy boots and a white sun hat.

== Release and promotion ==
The album was released on 3 June 2013.

The album is administered by Universal International Music, a Netherlands-based office of Universal Music Group, per Paparizou's latest multi-territory deal. As a result, the album also carries the "Universal Music" logo. EMI Music Greece is Universal Music Group's sole major label operation in Greece (as of April 2013), therefore Paparizou is officially represented by EMI Music Greece in the Greek market.

It's the first Paparizou album to be at the Top10 of the official Greek album chart for 11 straight weeks.

== Singles ==
"Poso M'Aresei"

"Poso M'Aresei" was released in March 2013 as the lead off single. The song peaked at #3 on the Greek Songs Media Inspector Singles Chart. Music and Lyrics are by Mihalis "Meth" Kouinelis of the band Stavento. An official remix by "Lunatic" was released on 15 April. The song was performed at Madwalk 2013.

"Ena Lepto"

The second single from the album is called "Ena Lepto", a mid-tempo ballad composed by Giorgos Papadopoulos with lyrics by Akis Petrou. Elena performed the single at Madwalk 2013. The song peaked at #7 on the official greek airplay chart.

"Save Me (This Is An SOS)"

"Save Me (This Is An SOS)" was released radio stations in both Greece and Sweden on 29 May. It is the third official single from Elena's Greek studio album and the first English single from her One Life album. Music blog Idolator gave a positive review, saying the production shares similarities with hit songs by the likes of Shakira and Jennifer Lopez. Paparizou performed a mashup of "Save Me" and Freed From Desire by Gala at the annual Mad Video Music Awards. The song, along with the greek version "Sou Stelno SOS" peaked at #5 at the greek international airplay chart, and at #13 at the official combined airplay chart.

"Den Thelo Allon Iroa"

Is the fourth and final single from the album, a different music style for Helena reminding Amy Winehouse's songs. Music is composed by Dimitris Kontopoulos and Nikos Ntarmas as long as lyrics written by Nikos Moraitis. The video was directed by Alexandros Grammatopoulos. The song peaked at #11 on the official Greek airplay chart by Mediainspector.

== Track listing ==
No.	Title	Writer(s)	Producer(s)	Length
1.	"Den Thelo Allon Iroa" (Δε Θέλω Άλλον Ήρωα)	Dimitris Kontopoulos, Nikos Moraitis	Kontopoulos, Thodoros Darmas	3:16
2.	"Ti Ora Tha Vgoume (Chainsaw)" (Τι Ώρα Θα Βγούμε)	Oscar Holter, Jakob " Jakke" Erixson, Kristofer Östergren, Moraitis	Hotler/Erixson	3:36
3.	"Ena Lepto" (Ένα Λεπτό)	Giorgos Papadopoulos, Akis Petrou	Leonidas Tzitzos	3:06
4.	"Sou Stelno SOS (Save me (This is an SOS))" (Σου Στέλνω SOS)	Jimmy Jansson, Bobby Ljunggren, Micah Wilshire, Giannis Doxas	Jansson, Fredrik Sonefors	3:08
5.	"Epitelous Moni" (Επιτέλους Μόνη)	Miltos Ioannidis, Giorgos Pilianidis	Darmas	3:35
6.	"Poso M'Aresei" (Πόσο Μ' Αρέσει)	METH	METH	3:34
7.	"Den Tha Kimithis Apopse" (Δε Θα Κοιμηθείς Απόψε)	Nikos Antipas, Moraitis	Antipas	3:13
8.	"The Groove Is The Solution"	Gabriel Russel	Karl-Ola S. Kjellholm	3:51
9.	"I Nihta" (Η Νύχτα)	Papadopoulos, Petrou	Tzitzos	3:24
10.	"Oute Ki Esi" (Ούτε Κι Εσύ)	Papadopoulos, Gioula Georgiou	Tzitzos	3:27
11.	"Vrehi Filia (Crazy For Love)" (Βρέχει Φιλιά)	Nalle Ahlstedt, Petri Somer, Nicole Fuentes, Moraitis	Ahlstedt	3:20
12.	"Mesimeria (One life)" (Μεσημέρια)	Pasi Siitonen, Risto Asikainen, her0ism, Doxas	Darmas	3:33
13.	"Soma Kai Psihi (Set Your Heart On Me)" (Σώμα Και Ψυχή)	Jansson, Ljunggren, Vaggelis Konstantinidis	Jansson, Sonefors	3:07
14.	"Mi Mou Eksigis" (Μη Μου Εξηγείς)	Antipas, Moraitis	Antipas	4:04

Bonus track
No.	Title	Writer(s)	Producer(s)	Length
15.	"Save Me (This Is An SOS)"	Jansson, Ljunggren, Wilshire	Jansson, Sonefors	3:08

- Source:.

== Charts ==
Chart	Peak position
Greek Albums Chart (IFPI Greece)	1
Cyprus Charts	3
