= Helena Paparizou =

Greek singer (born 1982)

- Έλενα Παπαρίζου
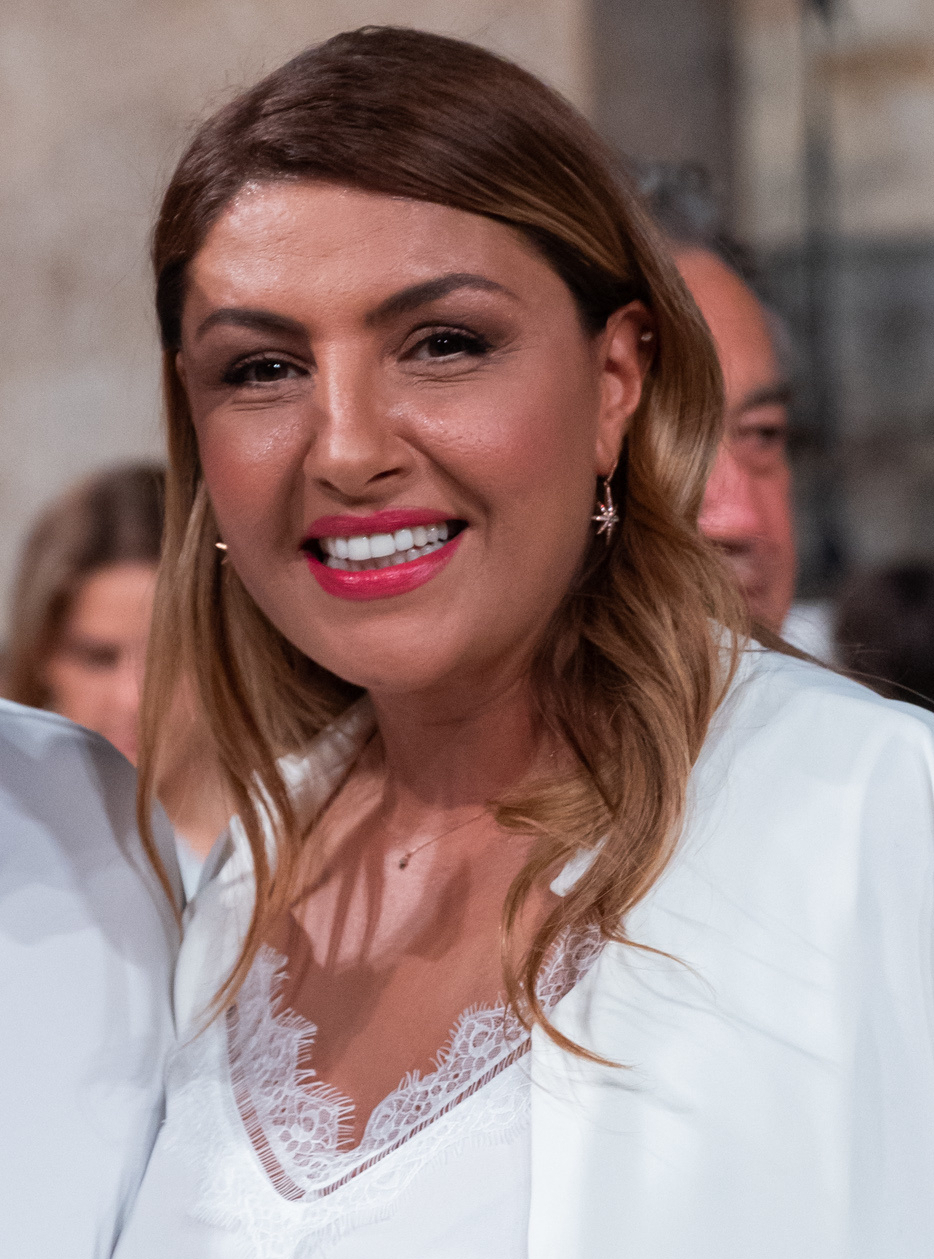
- Paparizou in 2022
- Born: 31 January 1982 (age 44); Borås, Sweden
- Citizenship: Sweden; Greece
- Occupations: Singer; songwriter; television personality
- Years active: 1999–present
- Works: Discography
- Spouse: Andreas Kapsalis (m. 2015–2025)
- Awards: Full list
- Musical career
- Genres: Pop; pop rock; laïko; dance-pop; electronica
- Instruments: Vocals
- Labels: Sony (2003–2012); Capitol (2013–2017); Minos EMI (2013–present); Universal (2013–present)

Helena Paparizou (Greek: Έλενα Παπαρίζου; born 31 January 1982) is a Swedish-born Greek singer and television personality. Born and raised in Sweden to Greek parents, she launched her singing career in 1999 as a member of the musical duo Antique, alongside her friend Nikos Panagiotidis. The group released five studio albums between 1999 and 2003, and represented Greece in the Eurovision Song Contest 2001.

Antique disbanded in 2003, and Paparizou signed a solo recording contract with Sony Music. Her debut solo single "Anapandites Kliseis" preceding the album Protereotita (2004); her style had an emphasis on laïko, pop, and dance sounds. In 2005, she represented Greece in the Eurovision Song Contest 2005 with the song "My Number One", which won the contest for Greece for the first time. Paparizou attempted a career beyond Greece with English-language material, charting in a few countries abroad. Her three subsequent albums Iparhi Logos (2006), The Game of Love (2006) and Vrisko To Logo Na Zo (2008) all peaked at number one in Greece and reached platinum sales. Her fifth studio album Giro Apo T' Oneiro (2010) was also certified platinum. Paparizou's final release before she left Sony Music, Greatest Hits & More, was released in 2011. Since 2013 she is part of Minos EMI - Universal Music labels. In 2017 she released her biggest hit to date titled An Me Dis Na Kleo feat Anastasios Rammos off her album Ouranio Toxo counting 35 million views on YouTube.

Paparizou has released 10 studio albums in total. Apart from singing, in the 2010s she moved into television as a judge on Dancing on Ice (2011) and as a contestant on Let's Dance (2012). Since 2016, Paparizou has been a judge on The Voice of Greece. She lived with her fiancé and manager Toni Mavridis from 1999 until their separation in 2011. From 2015 until 2025 she lived with civil engineer Andreas Kapsalis.

Paparizou has been awarded three Arion Music Awards, a European Border Breakers Award, 35 MAD Video Music Awards and an MTV Europe Music Award. On 14 March 2010, Alpha TV ranked her as the 14th top-certified domestic female artist since 1960, having won seven platinum and four gold records. Paparizou was the most successful debuting female artist of the 2000s and established herself as one of the top acts of the latter half of the decade. In 2010, Forbes listed Paparizou as the 21st most powerful and influential celebrity in Greece.

== Early life ==
Paparizou was born on 31 January 1982 in Borås, Västergötland, Sweden and raised in Örgryte, Gothenburg. She is the youngest child of Greek parents Georgios Paparizos (1948–2008) and Efrosynë "Froso" Paparizou. Paparizou's parents were from the Karditsa region in western Thessaly; she has a sister Aretë, known as Rita, and a brother Konstantinos, known as "Dinos." Paparizou's parents met and married in her mother's hometown and moved to Borås in 1970. In 1985, the family moved back to Greece to live in Volos with relatives because Paparizou had contracted asthma and her lungs could not cope with the cold Scandinavian climate. After two years, she was well enough for the family to return to live in Gothenburg, Sweden. As a result of the trip to Greece, Paparizou spoke Greek as a first language and did not make friends with many Swedish children, because she attended a Greek-language school. Paparizou continues to suffer from breathing problems and often carries an inhaler on-stage.

Paparizou performed for the first time in front of a Greek audience when she was eleven, singing Christos Dantis' "Moro Mou". Two years later, Paparizou had decided she wanted to be a singer and began to study Greek music. By the age of fourteen, Paparizou had formed her first group, Soul Funkomatic with three Hispanic teenagers. They played hip hop music while saving money to record songs; they disbanded two years later. On 29 October 1998, thirteen of Paparizou's close friends died in the Gothenburg nightclub fire, where 63 people died and more than 200 were injured. She had begged her mother to let her go to the party, but was not allowed to attend. After losing her friends, Paparizou decided to abandon singing. She started classes at the Art Performing School where she studied theater, acting, television and directing.

== Career ==
=== 1999–2003: Antique era ===
In 1999, some DJ friends of Paparizou's brother asked Paparizou to make a demo of the Notis Sfakianakis hit "Opa Opa", but because the lyrics are written from a male point of view, Paparizou wanted to sing with her childhood friend Nikos Panagiotidis. Some record producers, who were interested in signing a male/female duo to sing covers of traditional Greek songs, contacted Paparizou, who suggested Panagiotidis. The pair formed Antique, and signed to the independent label Bonnier Music. They called themselves "Antique" because it gave the impression of being "classical" and "timeless", and connoted Paparizou's association of Greek music with the idea of it being distant, old-fashioned, and something of an acquired taste. Their debut single "Opa Opa" became a hit in Sweden and Norway, eventually entering the top ten in both countries, making "Antique" the first act to reach the Swedish top five with a song sung in Greek. Their later singles "Dinata Dinata", "Follow Me" and "Moro Mou" also charted in Sweden.

Although relatively unknown in Greece in 2001, the duo entered the Greek national final of the Eurovision Song Contest with the song "(I Would) Die for You", composed by Nikos Terzis with lyrics by Antonis Pappas. They won joint first place, but as "Antique" had also won the public vote were declared the overall winners and went to the 2001 Eurovision Song Contest in Copenhagen. Their song won third place with 147 points; the highest Greek Eurovision placing at the time. It became their biggest hit in Greece, reaching Platinum status, peaking at number three in Sweden and charting elsewhere. Antique's Eurovision success led to wider recognition in Greece. They recorded four studio albums—which were only mildly successful—performed a small European and North American tour and collaborated with artists including Katy Garbi and Slavi Trifonov. Paparizou and Panagiotidis then decided to pursue solo careers. Initially, critics of the split accused Paparizou of abandoning her friend for her own career interests. Paparizou said the split was not permanent, but was a mutual decision to try other things, with plans of a reunion in mind.

=== 2003–2005: Solo career, Protereotita, Eurovision Song Contest, and international recognition ===
In late 2003, Paparizou signed a solo recording contract with Sony Music and released her debut single "Anapandites Kliseis", as a double A-side with "Treli Kardia". The release reached number one on the Greek Top 50 Singles Chart and was certified Gold by IFPI Greece. From late 2003, Paparizou was the opening act for various artists across Greece, including Antonis Remos and Giannis Spanos, Apostolia Zoi, Nino, Thanos Petrelis, Sakis Rouvas and Giorgos Mazonakis. Later in 2004, the video of "Anapandites Kliseis" won her a MAD Video Music Award for Best Dance Video, and was nominated for Best Video by a New Artist. At the award ceremony, Paparizou sang a duet of the song with its writer Christos Dantis.

On 27 June 2004, Paparizou released her debut solo album Protereotita, from which the tracks "Anditheseis", "Katse Kala" and "Stin Kardia Mou Mono Thlipsi" were released as singles. It received mixed reviews from critics. The album earned Paparizou her first Arion Award for Best Female Pop Singer, and the videos for "Katse Kala" and "Treli Kardia" won her MAD Awards for Best Female Video and Best Direction, respectively.

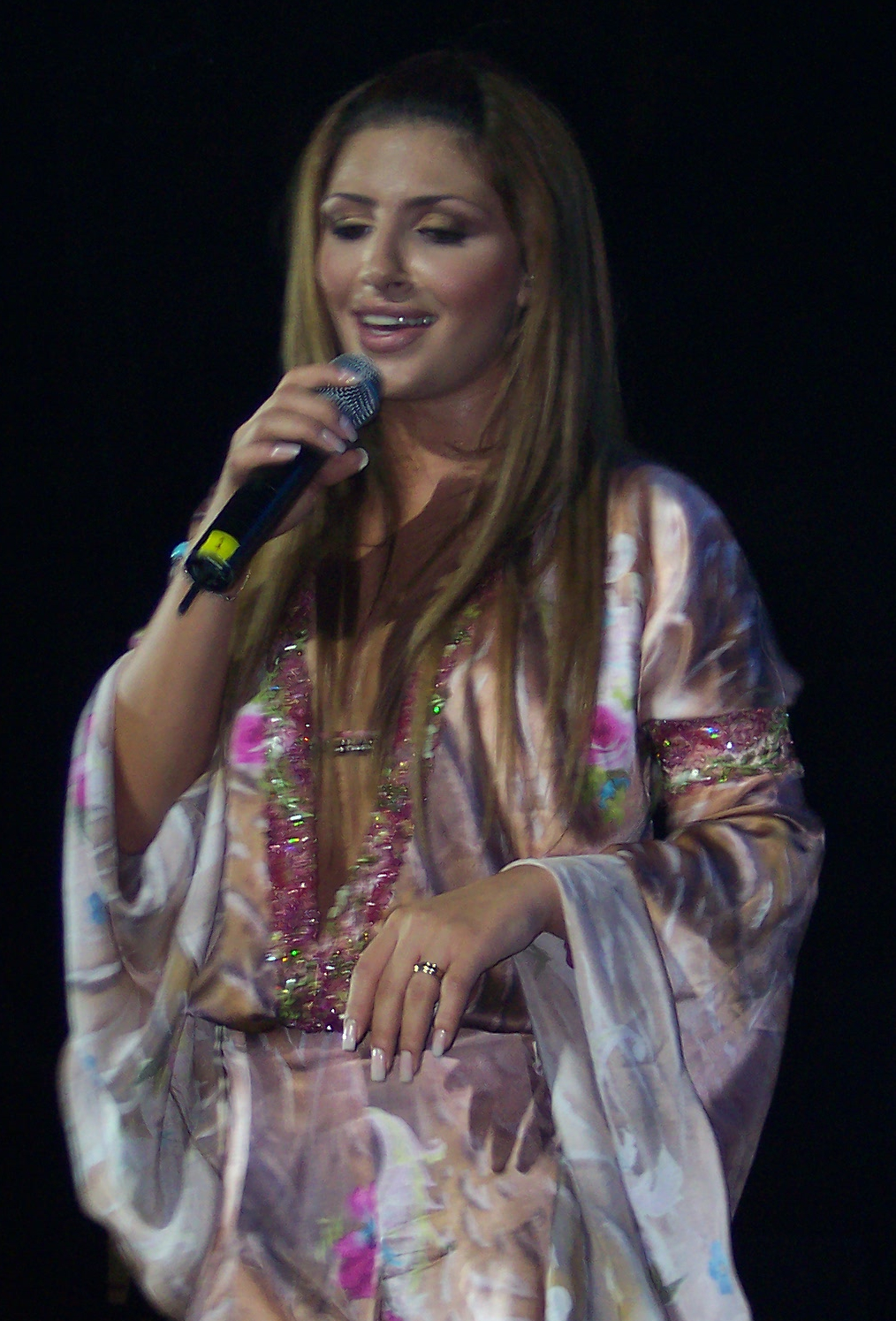
Paparizou performing in Chicago in September 2005

Paparizou moved permanently to Greece in 2004, and after a long selection process led by national broadcaster Hellenic Radio and Television (ERT), she was selected to represent Greece in the Eurovision Song Contest 2005 held in Kyiv, Ukraine. ERT originally considered Paparizou as a possible back-up singer for a high-profile artist, but those deals fell through. She said at the time that no-one had wanted her to participate in Eurovision. The song "My Number One", composed by Manos Psaltakis with lyrics by Christos Dantis and Natalia Germanou, was chosen by the jury vote and telephone vote in the Greek national final.

Although her first name is "Elena", Paparizou promoted herself as "Helena" in the lead up to her Eurovision appearance to distinguish herself from popular names in other countries. She continues to call herself Helena on all non-Greek promotions and releases, although she prefers to be known as "Elena". Paparizou toured Europe to promote her Eurovision entry. During this time, she was appointed a Greek Ministry of Tourism ambassador by Dimitris Avramopoulos, the Minister of Tourism. He spent €500,000 in her campaign to promote Greece through merchandise and advertisements that aired throughout Europe.

On 21 May 2005, Paparizou won the Eurovision Song Contest; the first Greek win in its history. Her performance scored 230 points and the maximum 12 points from ten nations. Her performance was also responsible for the highest viewing ratings in Greek television history. Her win provoked mass celebrations on the streets of Athens, and on her return home she was congratulated at a State reception at the Maximos Mansion by the Minister of State Theodoros Roussopoulos, Prime Minister Kostas Karamanlis and various government officials. Paparizou's Eurovision victory transformed her from a relatively minor celebrity to a notable music act, cementing her solo career and giving her wide international exposure. On 14 July she performed at the birthday gala of Victoria, Crown Princess of Sweden. While ascending the stage to greet the royal family, King Carl XVI Gustaf of Sweden stood to embrace Paparizou instead of offering a handshake, causing controversy for putting his hand lower on her back than is socially acceptable. The Royal Court later issued a statement saying that his hand had slipped.

Paparizou toured Europe, performing in all the countries that gave her 12 points. A tour with Nikos Kourkoulis to the Greek diaspora in North America and Australia, followed. Paparizou stated that if she considered doing anything Eurovision-oriented again it be for her birth country Sweden, since she already had her turn with Greece. After performing as an opening act on numerous occasions, Paparizou headlined at Fever for the 2005–06 season, supported by Christos Pazis and with Giorgos Tsalikis.

After Paparizou's Eurovision win and several reissues, the album certified double Platinum by IFPI Greece. To capitalise on this success, it was reissued as Protereotita: Euro Edition in single and double disc format, and released as a compilation in some European countries as My Number One, which peaked at number 13 in Sweden. The Euro Edition became Paparizou's first album to reach number one and earned her another Arion award for Best Female Pop Singer. The tracks "My Number One", "The Light in Our Soul" and "A Brighter Day" were released as singles, which peaked at number one, three and twenty-four respectively in Sweden, and were minor hits in other countries as well. "My Number One" was released in the United States by Moda Records with remixes in August 2006, peaking at number eight on the Billboard Hot Dance Club Play chart. "My Number One" was certified Platinum, and becoming her first number-one airplay hit, while "The Light in Our Soul"/"To Fos Sti Psyhi" peaked at two.

In November 2005, Paparizou released a new CD single "Mambo!", which peaked at number one on the Greek Singles Chart for 10 weeks and the airplay charts, and gained Platinum status. It is her most successful single to date and was the second highest-selling single of 2005, surpassing "My Number One". She performed "My Number One" at the MAD VMAs in 2005, and in 2006 won awards for Best Pop Video ("The Light in Our Soul"), Best Video by a Female Artist ("My Number One"), and Artist of the Year ("Mambo!"). The album was reissued for a third time as Protereotita: Euro Edition + Mambo! in November. Paparizou won the European Border Breakers Award at the Midem Festival in Cannes for the international editions of her debut album in 2007.

=== 2006–2007: Iparhi Logos, The Game of Love, and various soundtracks ===
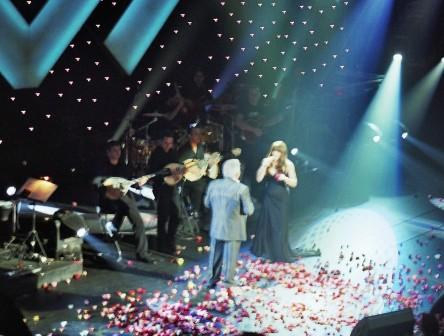
Paparizou performing with Paschalis Terzis at Iera Odos in 2006

In January 2006, 25 artists including Paparizou formed the group Simmeteho Energa, and recorded a charity single "Eho Ti Dinami" in support of the Greek Cancer Society. It was released as a CD single. The two-disc album contained previously released material and live recordings from her MAD Secret Concert held in December 2005, and formed the first edition of the series.

On 12 April, Paparizou released her second album, Iparhi Logos in Greece where it had a good critical reception. While promoting the album, Paparizou performed the title track at the Arion Music Awards. The album included three hit singles; "Iparhi Logos", "Gigolo" and "An Ihes Erthi Pio Noris". It topped the Greek Albums Chart for a number of weeks and was certified platinum by IFPI Greece after seven months, with shipments of 30,000 copies. It also reached number one in Cyprus and was certified Platinum there, with shipments of 6,000 copies. A cover of Celine Dion's "Just Walk Away" was released as a promo single, with the Greek version of "Mambo!" included. Paparizou won MAD VMAs for Best Video by a Female Artist ("Gigolo") and Best-Dressed Artist in a Video ("An Ihes Erthi Pio Noris"), from five nominations and opened the show singing "Aquarius/Let the Sunshine In" and "Min Fevgeis".

The album was also nominated for two Cyprus Music Awards in 2007, where she also performed. The album was reissued in February 2007 as Iparhi Logos: Platinum Edition to include Paparizou's number one hit "Mazi Sou", one of two songs she sang for the soundtrack of the television series of the same name, "Fos" from the Barbie kai I Dodeka Vasilopoules soundtrack released in 2006, and her newest hit single, a cover of Voula Georgouti's rebetiko "Min Fevgeis", which reached number two. Prior to the reissue, the singles were also released on the EP single Fos, which reached number one on the Greek Top 50 Singles Chart and was certified Gold, making it her fourth consecutive number-one hit on that chart. On 20 May 2006, Paparizou opened the Eurovision Song Contest 2006 in Athens with "My Number One" and later performed "Mambo!", but ERT ran commercials during the performance so a number of countries missed the song. Paparizou's song "Heroes" was the official song of, and performed at the 2006 European Athletics Championships in Gothenburg. The single was released in Sweden and Finland, becoming her second number-one hit in the former.

Following Eurovision, Paparizou wanted to start an international career, Her debut English-language album The Game of Love was released on 25 October 2006. By April 2007, it had been released in 14 countries in Europe and in South Africa. In Greece and Cyprus, the album peaked at number one and received Platinum certifications. Because it was considered a "foreign" release, the album was only eligible to chart on the Greek Foreign Albums Chart, which it topped. It also topped the mixed Greek Albums Chart, and was certified platinum by IFPI Greece after 11 weeks on the chart in January 2007, with shipments of 15,000 copies. "Teardrops" was released as the first Greek single from the album, and peaked at number one in Greece. The album managed to peak at No. 18 in Sweden too. "Mambo!" charted in Sweden, peaked at number 5, helped by a new video that was targeted towards a broader audience. The single was certified Gold in Sweden. Although Paparizou was expected to promote the album abroad that winter, she chose to perform alongside Paschalis Terzis at Iera Odos from 27 October.

In early 2007, Paparizou became the spokesperson for her previous sponsor, Nokia Greece, and released the song "Ola Einai Mousiki" in October 2007 for promotion. She collaborated with retailer Plaisio and released a limited edition MP4 player called "MP4 Total Helena" (2GB) by Turbo-X, which contained a special compilation and music videos, which were also released as "TH4" MP4 in 2008 along with her new album material and exclusive content. She released a cover of Blind Melon's "3 Is a Magic Number" in Sweden as part of a television advertisement for a mobile phone company; it peaked at number 18. Paparizou was featured on Greek television presenter Nikos Aliagas' song "I Zilia Monaksia"—a cover of the Pascal Obispo hit "L'envie d'Aimer"—for his album project Rendez-Vous, and released the song "To Fili Tis Zois" for the soundtrack of the film of the same name. "To Fili Tis Zois" remained at number one for five weeks, becoming her most successful airplay single until 2011, and one of the most successful songs of the late 2000s. It was nominated for four MAD VMAs, winning Best Pop Video, and Paparizou won Artist of the Year for "Mazi Sou" and was nominated for "I Zilia Monaxia", making six nominations in 2008. The single became the first digital single to be certified Gold in Greece since the marketing trend had become popular in 2006.

=== 2008–2010: Vrisko To Logo Na Zo, Giro Apo T' Oneiro, and headlining tours ===
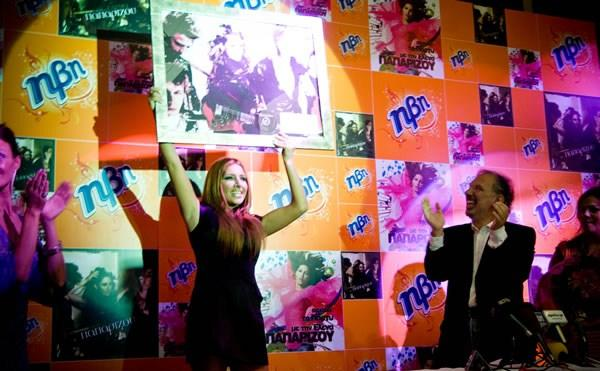
Paparizou receiving the platinum certification for Vrisko To Logo Na Zo

Paparizou released her fourth album, Vrisko To Logo Na Zo on 12 June 2008. The tracks "Porta Gia Ton Ourano", "I Kardia Sou Petra", "Pirotehnimata", and "Eisai I Foni" were released as singles. The music video of "Pirotehnimata" was nominated for Sexiest Video and won the sixth MAD Video Music Awards for Best Pop Video and Video of the Year. "I Kardia Sou Petra" won the award for Female Artist of the Year, while "Porta Gia Ton Ourano" was nominated for Artist of the Year. Paparizou promoted a rock-inspired image for the album; a change from her pop/laïko style. The album and its concept received mixed reviews. In its first week, the album was certified Gold, eventually peaked at number one in Greece and was certified Platinum after three months. It became the second best-selling album of the year in both domestic and mixed domains, peaking in Cyprus at number two and was certified Platinum.

To promote the album, two songs were released as digital downloads and promo singles, while Paparizou's duet version of Spanish group Chambao's single "Papeles Mojados" was played in some Spanish clubs. In June, Paparizou opened the MAD Video Music Awards 2008 with a remix of "Porta Gia Ton Ourano" with Madonna's song "4 Minutes", and was featured in a performance of hip hop group Stavento. Paparizou embarked on her first national tour To Party Arhizei Tour from 2 July to 19 September 2009. The finale concert of the tour, set for Herakleion, Crete three days later, was cancelled because of the weather conditions and instead, Paparizou performed two shows in October 2009 at a club called Anadromes. The tour was attended by 192,000 people in its 29 venues, selling out the Thessaloniki venue. The album was reissued after the tour as The Deluxe Edition in December 2009 and included a video of the show titled Live in Concert, which was also available individually. A further reissue of the album, set to include Paparizou's newly recorded material including the new single "Tha 'Mai Allios" and MAD Secret Concert tracks, was scheduled for late 2009, but this was abandoned when the singer recorded a new studio album for 2010.

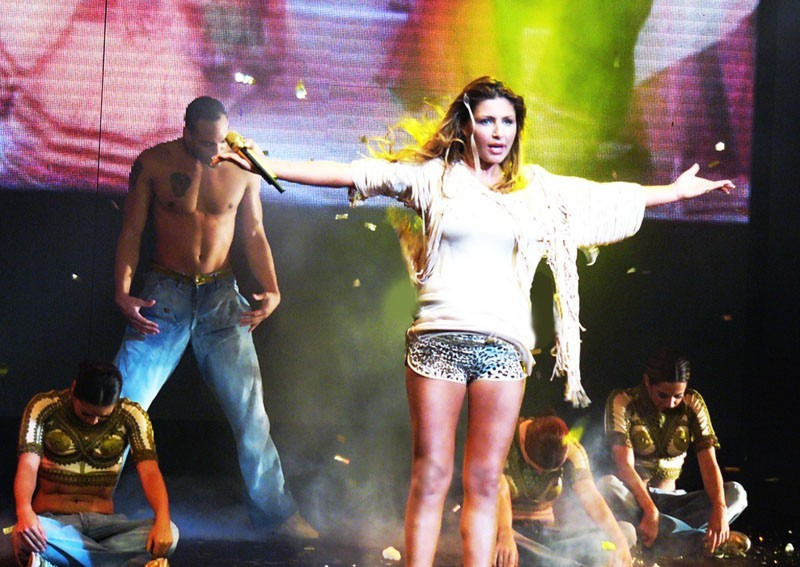
Paparizou performing "Katse Kala" at Thalassa: People's Stage on 12 September 2009.

Paparizou was featured on the Bonnier soundtrack project Alla Himlens Änglar, released in August, where she contributed her first Swedish-language songs "Allt jag vill" (Everything I want) and "Genom krig och kärlek" (Through war and love). On 23 October 2008, she performed with other artists in a concert at the Siemens Arena in Vilnius, Lithuania, that was attended by approximately 10,000 people. From 30 October to 9 April she again performed alongside Paschalis Terzis at Iera Odos with Manos Pirovolakis as the opening act. Paparizou was the main act at the Thalassa: People's Stage, a concert-themed club stage, from May to September. At this venue she was supported by acts 15.50, Stavento and Loukas Giorkas. Paparizou returned to the stage of MAD Secret Concerts on 26 May, the eighth edition of the series. A video titled MAD Secret Concert Vol.II was released in mid-late 2009. During the winter, Paparizou went to Sweden where she worked on her new album and spent time with her mother. An English-language album had been announced for 2009, however those plans did not materialise because of Paparizo's father's sudden death. Three songs were recorded, one of which is a tribute to him.

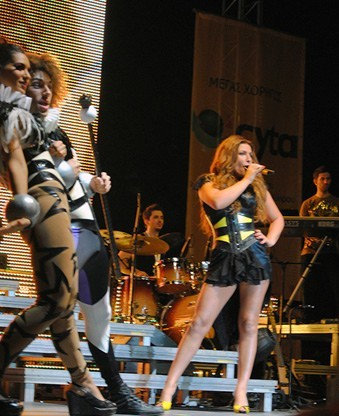
Paparizou performing in Athens on 30 June 2010 on the Fysika Mazi tour with dancers

Paparizou joined the new marketing trend of releasing albums with Sunday newspapers; on 28 March her fifth studio album Giro Apo T' Oneiro was released in the Greek newspaper RealNews, with a physical release the next day in standard and deluxe editions featuring a video. Eleven days later, the album had achieved total shipments of 140, 000 units physically and via the newspaper. Newspaper shipments are not taken into consideration by IFPI, however; in a radio interview in August 2010, Paparizou said that the album had sold enough physical copies to be certified Platinum by IFPI. On 6 November 2010, Paparizou was awarded platinum certification, with shipments of at least 12,000 units of Giro Apo T' Oneiro by IFPI Greece at the grand opening of the new Metropolis music store at The Mall Athens. The tracks "Tha 'Mai Allios", "An Isouna Agapi", "Psahno Tin Alitheia" and "Girna Me Sto Htes" were released as singles. "Tha 'Mai Allios", released a year before the album, became the singer's first advertisement for the soft drink brand Ivi's. Paparizou won the MTV Europe Award for Best Greek Act, and received a preliminary nomination for the Best European Act but finished sixth, missing the official nominations by one spot. The video for "Tha 'Mai Allios" won the MAD Video Music Award for Video of the Year and was nominated for Best Pop Video, while the video for "An Isouna Agapi" won the award for Sexiest Video and received nominations for Female Artist of the Year and Artist of the Year.

On 30 June 2010, Paparizou and Onirama embarked on their joint Fisika Mazi Tour beginning at Theatro Petras as part of the Stone Festival in Petroupoli. However, a surprise inspection by the SDOE at the Kefalonia venue stopped the tour. A total of 8,500 concert tickets had not been stamped and the contract fees of the performing artists had not been submitted. The production was found guilty of tax violations. Paparizou said she had no knowledge of the occurrences and that she had no affiliation, except as a performer, with the production group. At the first MAD Fanatics concert, a tribute to Michael Jackson, Paparizou performed with seven other artists; she closed the show with covers of Jackson's "Heal the World" and "You Are Not Alone". During the winter season, Paparizou appeared with Antonis Remos at the Diogenis Studio for a reported fee of €10,000 per night, €4,000 fewer than her previous season of performances. Paparizou was featured on Albert Hammond's greatest hits album Legend on the tracks "Enredao" and its English-language version, "Tangled Up in Tears".

=== 2011–2012: Greatest Hits & More, and Dancing on Ice ===
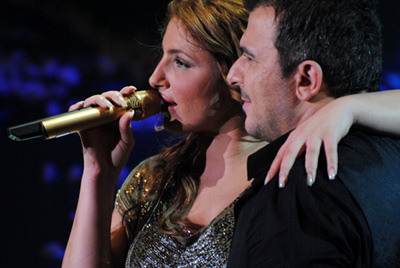
Paparizou performing with Antonis Remos at Diogenis Studio on 2 January 2011

On 2 February 2011, Paparizou was one of eight acts performing at MAD TV's first charity fashion music show MADWalk—Greece's version of the international Fashion Rocks. She represented fashion designer Apostolos Mitropoulos and performed her new single "Baby It's Over", which was the lead single from her three-disc compilation Greatest Hits & More. She appeared at the Flight Night Club in Sofia, Bulgaria on 8 February. "Baby It's Over" debuted at number one the Billboard Greek Digital Singles Chart; it was her fourth number one hit on that chart and her first single to top any Greek chart in three years. It also topped the Greek Airplay Chart for ten non-consecutive weeks, becoming the most successful single of her career. The song won two awards at the 2011 MAD Video Music Awards for Female Artist of the Year and Fashion Icon of the Year. Paparizou was nominated for Artist of the Year and received a fourth nomination for Best Pop Video for "Psahno Tin Alitheia". The album's second single, "Love Me Crazy"—released in Greek as "O, ti Niotho Den Allazi"—was released in May 2011, and peaked at number five on the airplay chart. The songs' lyrics, particularly those of the lead single, caused speculation that Paparizou's twelve-year relationship with Mavridis had ended, which was proved to be correct. Greatest Hits & More was released on 23 May; it debuted at number two on the Greek Albums Chart where it stayed for three weeks, and was the best-selling domestic album of the week.

Paparizou spent the next six months in Sweden with family and friends. In June 2011, she announced that Mavridis would no longer be her manager and that she had recruited a new team of Swedish collaborators. Her only professional appearances were at a four-date tour to Cyprus. Paparizou wanted to revive her career in Sweden—which had declined since 2006—and to expand her career outside music. She announced a second English-language album and European tour, along with possible participation in Melodifestivalen—which she had turned down in the past. She also considered moving back to Sweden permanently. She also said that any future collaborations with Mavridis in the future would be decided by her label. In the third quarter of 2011, Paparizou recorded a duet of the nisiotiko classic "Dari Dari" with Nana Mouskouri for her duet album Tragoudia Apo Ta Ellinika Nisia (Songs from the Greek islands), and was a guest performer at the Mouskouri's anniversary concert at the Berlin Philharmonic on 29 November. Although she had originally declined offers to perform during the winter season 2011–12, from 18 November she performed as a supporting act for Yiannis Parios in Thessaloniki.

Paparizou made her television debut as a judge on the first season of ANT1's Dancing on Ice from 6 November to 22 January withshow polarised critics. Following her television debut, Paparizou received offers to appear on Dancing with the Stars, including as a contestant. She instead appeared on the Swedish version, Let's Dance in early 2012, partnered with David Watson. Initially considered one of the favourites to win, she received moderate scores and was voted off in the third episode, placing ninth out of ten contestants.

In December, Paparizou released the single "Mr. Perfect", which peaked at number seven on the digital chart and reached the top 30 in the airplay chart. The song was remixed by Playmen, who with Paparizou performed it along with Joan Jett and the Blackhearts' "I Hate Myself for Loving You" at the 2012 MADWalk on 2 February 2012. The song's video earned her three nominations for Best Pop Video, Female Artist of the Year, and Artist of the Year at the 2012 MAD Video Music Awards, while "Baby It's Over" gained a fourth nomination for MAD 106.2 Track of the Year; she won the awards for Female Artist and Track of the Year. Paparizou performed a cabaret version of Eric Saade's "Popular" for the final of Melodifestivalen 2012.

At the 2012 MAD Video Music Awards, Paparizou performed a new version of the ballad "Poios" from Vrisko To Logo Na Zo, and was also featured in Playmen's "All the Time"—a remix of the Eddie Murphy song—along with Courtney and RiskyKidd. The song peaked at number two on the Official Greek Airplay Chart and became the thirty-fourth most played tracks in Greece for 2012. Both songs were released to radio the next day, and from the end of June to mid-August Paparizou toured Greece and Cyprus with Melisses. It was reported that she might perform from late 2012 to early 2013 with Natasa Theodoridou at Votanikos. While Paparizou's contract with Sony Music Greece had formally ended in early 2011, she remained attached to the label for several months. On 22 June, her A&R representative Giannis Doxas officially announced the end of their collaboration and her departure from the label.

In mid-2012, Paparizou started recording a new album. She said in radio interviews that she was searching for a new style for her upcoming Greek album. She told MTV Greece that the album have 10 tracks. During October she recorded a laiko duet titled Lathos Agapes with Natasa Theodoridou; this peaked at number eleven in the official Greek Airplay Chart by Mediainspector. On 9 November, she performed a live, acoustic version of John Lennon song "Imagine" at a dinner for the 2012 Athens Classic Marathon. On 1 February 2013, Sony Music released digitally in Greek iTunes a second compilation album titled The Love Collection, which consisted of love ballads from previous albums.

=== 2013–2015: Ti Ora Tha Vgoume?, One Life, and Nine The Musical ===
In early 2013, Paparizou's official fan club announced that she had signed a multi-territory deal with Universal Music Group, which has exclusive agreements with labels across the Universal Music Group, including EMI Music Greece and Lionheart Records in Sweden. On 3 June 2013, Paparizou will release her seventh studio album Ti Ora Tha Vgoume? with EMI Music Greece. The album was preceded by two singles: the lead single "Poso M'Aresei" on 19 March and "Ena Lepto" on 15 April. A music video was made for the former, which was released on 17 April. She has also released an English song called "Save Me (This Is an SOS)" on Lionheart Records in Sweden following a six-year absence from the Swedish market. During mid-2013, Paparizou performed at several Greek music festivals to promote her new album "Ti Ora Tha Vgoume?". An EP, which included four remixes of Save Me (This Is An SOS) by Sound Factory, was released; it reached number 27 on the Swedish Dance Chart.

In February 2013, Paparizou performed as a guest at Greece's Eurovision national final, singing "My Number One" with Vegas and "Apres Toi" with Vicky Leandros. On 27 May, Paparizou performed at "Gabby Awards 2013" in Hollywood and singing some of Melina Merkouri's songs.

On 1 February she performed at Melodifestivalen 2014, an event to select Sweden's entry for the Eurovision Song Contest 2014 in Copenhagen. An official announcement was made by the Swedish broadcaster, SVT in November 2013. Paparizou performed "Survivor" in the first heat on 1 February. On 1 March, Paparizou reached the final of Melodifestivalen 2014 after being voted into the top two of the Second Chance round of the competition. In the final, Paparizou came in fourth place. On 26 March, her third English-language album, titled One Life, was released in Sweden by Lionheart Music Group. Paparizou performed at the semi-final of The Voice of Greece her new single "Don't Hold Back On Love" on 2 May 2014. "Survivor" was certified gold in Sweden selling over 20,000 copies.

On 14 November up to 13 December 2014, Paparizou joined the Swedish Christmas Tour "Julgalan 2014" in Sweden along with Danny Saucedo, Alcazar, Mattias Andreasson, E-type, Erik Segerstedt, Linda Bengtzing and Albin. On 14 December, Paparizou sang in the Swedish church to celebrate Santa Lucia, which was broadcast by SVT.

In February 2015, Paparizou was featured on the house duo's HouseTwins single "Love Till It's Over", and later released her Greek single Otan Aggeli Klene. On March, Paparizou performed the singles as a guest at the Eurovision Greek Final along with the winning song of the Eurovision Song Contest 2014, "Rise Like a Phoenix".

On 23 May 2015 Paparizou was the spokesperson for the points of Greece at Eurovision Song Contest 2015. In a bizarre twist, she gave the twelve points not to Cyprus (its representative, John Karayiannis and his song "One Thing I Should Have Done" ended up with ten), but to Italy's Il Volo with their song "Grande Amore". On 29 May Paparizou performed "Angel" at the final of "Let's Dance" in Sweden.

Paparizou joined the Swedish summer tour "Diggiloo" from 6 June to 15 August with Magnus Carlsson, Martin Stenmarck, Charlotte Perrelli, Andreas Johnson, Björn Kjellman, Hanna Hedlund, Oskar Bly, Jessica Andersson and Magnus Johansson. Paparizou made her theatrical debut on the musical "Nine" at Pantheon Music Theatre as 'Saraghina'.

=== 2016–2018: Ouranio Toxo, The Voice of Greece, and Swedish residency ===
Paparizou recorded her new song in November 2015. "Misi Kardia" is written by Chris Mazz, Andy Nicolas & Yiannis Doxas and it was exclusively released on 89,8 Dromos FM. The music video was released on 15 February, along with the official release of the song. On 20 March 2016 Paparizou performed in "Dromos Superstar Voices" at BOX Athens with special host the Greek band "Melisses".

On 25 March 2016, it was officially announced that the song "Pou Pige Tosi Agapi", previous released on her album Iparhi Logos would be a part of the soundtrack album for the American comedy film "My Big Fat Greek Wedding 2".

From 26 April up to 6 May 2016, she was the commentator in the Swedish TV show "Inför Eurovision Song Contest" along with Oscar Zia, Njol Badjie and Wiktoria Johansson. Paparizou performed as a special guest star in the "Euroclub" and in the "Eurovision Village" during the Eurovision Song Contest week.

After 3 years of absence at the annual MAD Video Music Awards, Paparizou returned on the VMA's stage, performing her brand new single "Fiesta", which was officially released on 4 July and You Are the Only One along with Sergey Lazarev. Paparizou also performed at the semi-final of The X Factor Greece on 1 July, supporting the duo Stereo Soul.

In Summer 2016, Paparizou toured in Greece along with Mironas Stratis and Isaias Matiaba. In September 2016 Paparizou joined "My Way" residency show in Sweden with Claes Malmberg and Jan Malmsjö.

On 2 November 2016, it was officially announced that Paparizou would be one of the coaches at the third season of The Voice of Greece. The show premiered on Skai TV on 16 November.

The single "Agkaliase Me" was sent to the radios on 9 December 2016. On 28 April, Paparizou released "Haide", her first ever collaboration with Phoebus. Afterwards, released a digital EP "Extended Summer 2017" which included six tracks alongside the number one hit by her and Anastasios Rammos "An Me Dis Na Kleo". The music video released in October. The song is her biggest hit to date counting over 35 million views on YouTube.

In mid 2017, Paparizou toured Greece and Cyprus along with Despina Vandi in 16 cities in total. Later that year she was back as coach at the fourth season of The Voice in Greece. In December she released her sixth Greek album titled Ouranio Toxo, which was issued by Minos EMI/Universal. According to IFPI Statistics, 'Ouranio Toxo' Album peaked at Number 1. In September of the same year Paparizou released her final single Haide (English Version) from Capitol Music Group Sweden. Afterwards her contract expired.

In January 2018, Minos Emi/Universal announced that 'Etsi ki Etsi' is Paparizou's new single, and thus the successor of her Smash hit 'An me dis na kleo'. The mid-tempo song peaked at Number 5 on Official Greek Airplay. According to the Greek Media, the song 'Etsi ki Etsi' was regarded as the 2nd most played song in the radio by a Female Artist for the year (1st being 'An me dis na kleo'), making Paparizou the most radio played Female Artist in Greece/Cyprus for 2018.

An English Version of 'Etsi ki Etsi' was released, titled 'Totally Erased'. Nektarios Tyrakis wrote the lyrics of the English Release. Along with the English Version, Paparizou's record label (Minos EMI) released an EP which consisted of 6 remixes.

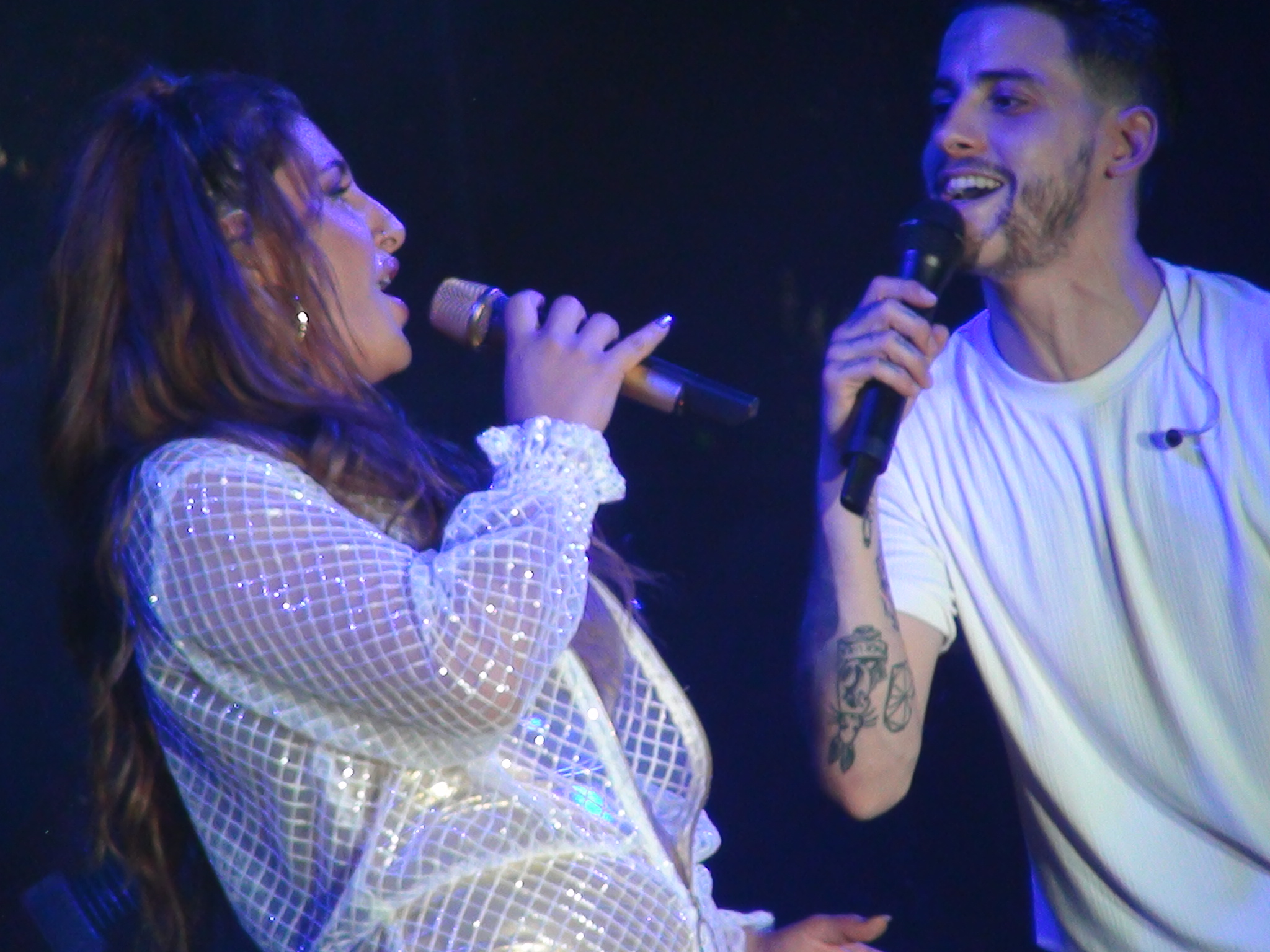
Paparizou performing with Anastasios Rammos as part of her Summer tour (2018)

During the Summer, Paparizou toured in Greece & Cyprus with Anastasios Rammos on her side. Further, Paparizou did 6 appearances alongside the Greek star Antonis Remos.

In May 2018, it was announced that Paparizou was nominated for 4 Mad Video Music Awards(a.k.a. Mad VMAs). She won 2 awards in the night; Best Female Adult and Best Collaboration(An me dis na kleo ft. Anastasios Rammos). Paparizou is regarded as being the most awarded Mad VMA artist to date, having a total of 26 awards. During the night Paparizou made 2 appearances; One in which she performed Ouranio Toxo ft. Idra Kayne, and one where she dueted with the Pop-rock Band, Melisses. Melisses & Paparizou performed one of the group's hit single, 'Ola moiazoun Kalokairi'. Their duet received mostly positive feedback, surpassing the 30 million views on YouTube to date making it the most viewed performance on VMA ever.

On 14 September, Serhat released his single "Total Disguise" in collaboration with Paparizou. The song peaked at Number 1 in Greek DJs Dance Chart. In October 2018, Paparizou returned at the Talent Singing Competition 'The Voice of Greece' for the 3rd consecutive year (5th season), alongside Rouvas, Mouzourakis & Maraveyas.

Paparizou's new single called 'Kati Skoteino'is a ballad & is written by the creators of the song 'An me dis na kleo';ARCADE (consisting of Anastasios Rammos, Diveno, Pavlos Manoli, Gaby Russell). The song premiered in Greek Radios on 8 October and was officially released on 15 October. The song was released by Minos EMI/Universal. The song peaked at Number 1 on Greek iTunes and reached the Top 20 of the Official Greek Airplay in just 3 weeks. Paparizou is the only Greek Artist to have managed to have 3 of her songs in the Top 20 of the Greek Airplay for the year 2018.

Paparizou's latest album 'Ouranio Toxo' has been certified Platinum after surpassing the 70 million streams in the digital platforms. In regards to the physical sales, the Album peaked at Number 1, making it the most successful album by a Female Artist for the year 2018 in Greece.

On 3 December, Paparizou released a Christmas song in both Greek & English (Hristougenna Xana - It is Christmas). The song was written by Anastasios A. Papanastasiou and ARCADE. Even without a video clip, the Greek version of the song saw immediate success, peaking at No. 3 on Greek iTunes and #4 on YouTube Trending videos. It was broadcast exclusively on Skai TV network.

=== 2019–2024: Apohrosis, and the Antique reunion ===
"Kati skoteino" was released in October 2018 as the lead single of Paparizou's seventh album Apohrosis (2021), which was produced by the group Arcade, consisting of Anastasios Rammos, Pavlos Manoli, Diveno, Gaby Russell and Loukas Damianakos. The second single 'Askopa Xenihitia" was released on 26 March 2019 along with a music video. During Summer 2019, Paparizou toured with Marinella, Makedonas and Ivi Adamou in Greece, Cyprus and Germany. Paparizou later took part in the MAD VMAs. On 3 April, Paparizou returned to Sweden to celebrate 20 years of Antique with Nikos Panagiotidis, appearing in several concerts and shows. On 10 June, she released her third single titled "Kalokairi Kai Pathos", sponsored by Carroten. In late 2019, Paparizou returned as coach at The Voice of Greece Season 6. On 19 October she started her live shows with Sakis Rouvas and Stelios Rokkos at the Athens nightclub Estate.

In 2020, she released a duet with Sakis Rouvas titled "Etsi Einai I Fasi" and the single "Mila Mou". On 29 July, she announced that Apohrosis would contain a phase of different kind of music, more in 80's pop, ballads and Greek folk. Her seventh single for the album was "Se Xeno Soma", an erotic ballad with social message videoclip about LGBT composed by Arcade, Padé (Loupasakis Pantelis) and Rene (famous Greek writer).

Apohrosis was released by Minos EMI on 29 January 2021 with 13 songs in total. In December 2020, Paparizou performed at the MAD Video Music Awards, singing her new duet with Marseaux, "Deja Vu". At the show, she won the Best Female Adult award.

On 13 February, she won Season 7 of The Voice of Greece as a mentor marking her first win at the talent show since she joined in 2016. On 22 May, she performed at the Eurovision Song Contest 2021 held in Rotterdam, Netherlands as an interval act alongside other Eurovision winners.

In Summer 2021, she went on a tour to promote Apohrosis alongside Tamta. On 25 June, she performed for three songs at the MAD VMAs: "Gia Pia Agapi" feat Anastasios Rammos, "Mi" and a "Twist In My Sobriety" cover with fellow Greek singer Joanne. She also won the Best Female Adult award.

Four years after Paparizou's last project in Sweden, she returned with an English song "Day and Night" produced by and featuring Magnus Carlsson; the song was released on 4 June 2021. In September, she returned to the set of The Voice of Greece for Season 8. At the end of 2021, Paparizou released her next English song "Lightning", performing it on MAD WALK 2021.

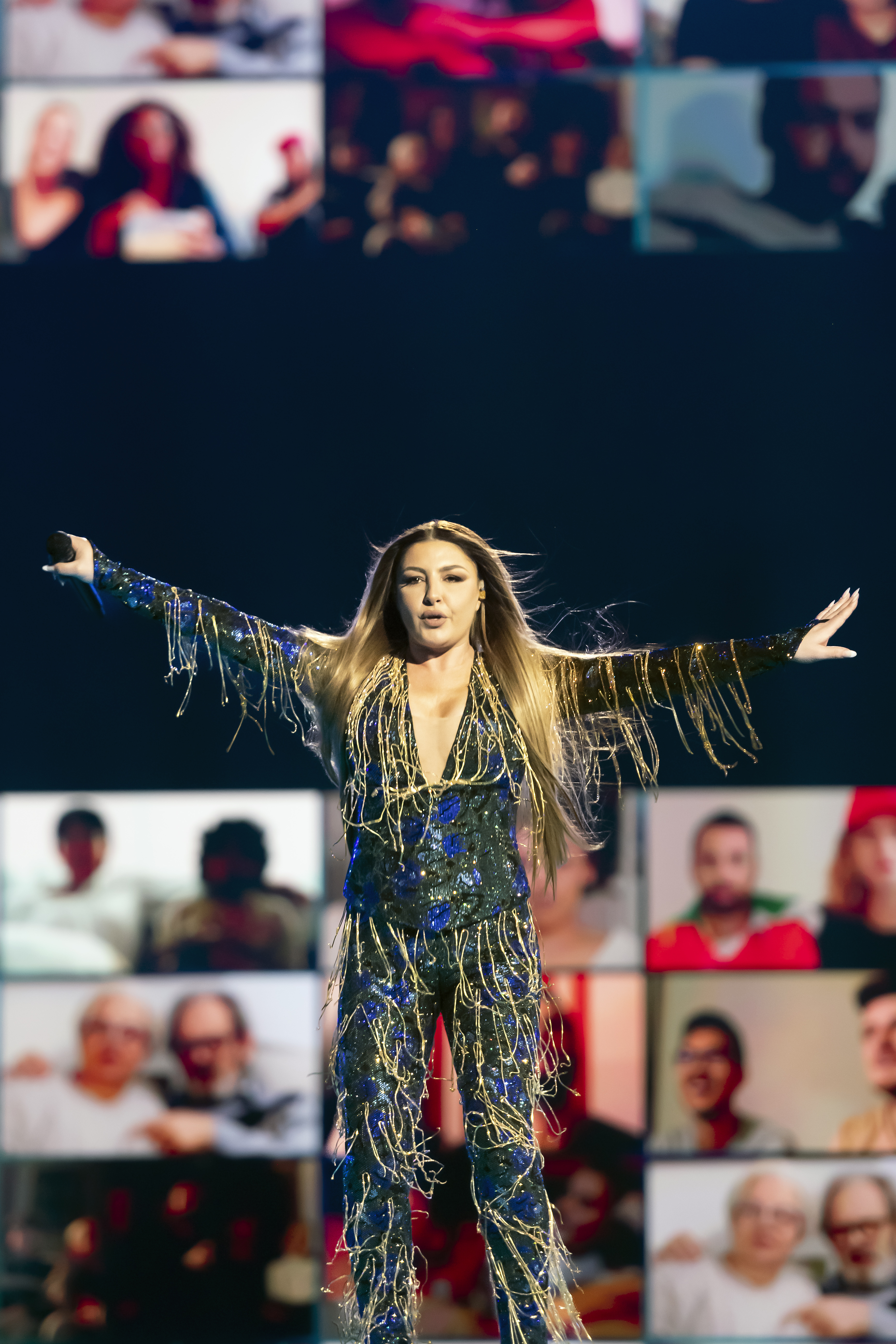
Helena Paparizou at the Eurovision Song Contest 2024

In March 2022 Helena and Nikos Panagiotidis reunited as Antique after 19 years covering Ti Ti song by Giorgos Alkaios that became hit during 90's. In the summer, Antique performed at the "Vi Som Älskar 90-talet" festival in Sweden, while Helena started her summer tour in Greece.

On 11 April, Stelios Rokkos released a song featuring Helena titled Kommatia (Pieces). On 27 April, Helena sang at Night at Rhythm 9.49 fm songs from her discography. In September she has booked some live appearances for first time in Odeon of Herodes Atticus with Marios Frangoulis. The 9th Season for The Voice of Greece begun on SKAI TV and was completed in March 2023. In November Helena did her comeback at Votanikos residency show next to Giorgos Sabanis and Anastasia for first time collaboration on stage until 11 March 2023.

Paparizou released a remake version on her 2004 hit song Katse Kala produced by Arcade featuring Marseaux and Joanne. On the occasion of the World Mental Health Day on 10 October, UNICEF Greece and its First Goodwill Ambassador, Helena Paparizou, joined their forces and re-released the song The Light in Our Soul, in collaboration with Spyros Lambrou children's choir, aiming to raise public awareness about mental health issues and eliminate the stigma that unfortunately still accompanies people facing them.

On 17 November, Helena performed My Number One along with dancers doing the same choreography bringing back nostalgia from 2005. The event was held in Amsterdam, one of the biggest Eurovision Parties, called Het Grote Songfestivalfeest, with guests in many Eurostars. Just before the end of 2022, in 9 December Paparizou started a new music chapter in her career releasing a new power ballad song titled Fevgo written by Giorgos Sabanis & Eleana Vrahali.

In 2023 Helena continued the promo for Schwarzkopf Professional #Blondeme Hair campaign through whole year. On end of April she made an appearance in USA Mellrose Ballroom club for Greek-Americans entertainment. The next day she visited New York and Times Square for a walk.

During summer period she toured Greece, Cyprus and Bulgaria for live gigs. For MAD VMA 2023 she did Live Performances of De Mou Ta Leei Kala/Everybody Needs A Man feat Holy Grace & Medley Hits (Fuego, Katse Kala, El Telephone, Mambo, Caramela, My Number One) with Eleni Foureira she won two awards also for Best Female Adult & Best Duet with Katse Kala. In June her new dance-pop song came out everywhere titled Den Mou Ta Leei Kala written by STAN and produced by ARCADE along its music video directed by Bodega in July.

In September she started a new promo Campaign for #JKstarNails. She was invited in Cyprus by Anna Vissi 50th anniversary concert as guest performing duets (Ise/Call Me, Sti Pyra, Se Eho Epithimisei, Everything, My Number One). Towards end of the year, Paparizou appeared at Man of the Year Awards in Cyprus, did some UNICEF conferences in Athens, did a Christmas concert in Agrinio city, Greece. On 28 December 2023, she celebrated 20 years in music since the debut in discography with the release of her first solo song Anapandites Klisis by giving a tribute interview on TRT.

For 2024 Helena Paparizou gave a charity concert in Cyprus in favor of Valentine's Day. In March there was a celebration throwback for her latest English album One Life which released 10 years ago in Sweden.

In April, Helena released brand new urban song titled "Mavra Gialia" and "Mono Gia Kini Min Mou Les" - a duet with Stavento on the latter's album titled Gia Sena. Paparizou was the spokesperson for the Greek jury in the final of the Eurovision Song Contest 2024. She was also part of the interval act of the second semi-final in the same contest.

At the first days of June Paparizou did a live concert in Canada. At MAD Video Music Awards she was given the MAD ICON Award for her 20 years in music industry while she performed Mavra Gialia and a Medley Remix by Playmen including (Treli Kardia, Pirotehnimata, Anapandites Klisis and Together Forever (English version of Fisika Mazi). Later in July Minos EMI put out an EP from vma performance on digital platforms. In summer she started her 2024 European summer tour visiting places around Greece, Cyprus and some European countries like Romania.

In September Helena appeared in EKO Acropolis Rally in Lamia, almost 18 years since her last show there. She also joined Melisses summer tour in some places. Around autumn Helena Paparizou sang on Athens, 20 Years Later in a special event for Euro 2004 honoring Greek football team's triumph.

In October Helena returned as a coach for The Voice of Greece Season 10. She also participated as a guest at The Secret Song TV show on Alpha, she did a photoshoot for Haralas Fashion A/W Campaign and gave several interviews on Greek TV promoting her new single "Update" and her personal life topics. One of her most recent performances was at the MadWalk 2024 with her brand new single "Update" which was released in EP format.

End of the year spot Paparizou in Cyprus starting her residency show with Konstantinos Christoforou at Notes Live Stage while giving some interviews on Cypriot press and magazines.

=== 2025–present: New music and new album ===
For the February to March period Paparizou and Christoforou returned to Notes in Cyprus for part 2 of their live gigs. Paparizou continued her promo campaign for Haralas fashion S/S collection, this time with singer Kostas Martakis in the role of models.

Helena Paparizou co-hosted with Sakis Rouvas the Greek final for Eurovision Song Contest 2025 on ERT. Paparizou expressed support for Klavdia's Greek entry in the contest with her song Asteromata, where she finished in 6th place in the grand final on 17 May. The Spotify and YouTube apps made mention of Paparizou's photo opportunity with Klavdia. On 21 May Greece celebrated on social media the 20th anniversary of the song "My Number One", with people uploading photos and videos from the Eurovision 2005 winning night.

During the summer of 2025, Paparizou will be getting ready for her summer tour in Greece, Cyprus and Bulgaria at the Spice Music Festival where the special musical guest will be Inna the day before, but the most important event will be as the opening act for Diana Ross at Kallimarmaro Stadium in Athens on 16 July 2025, where Paparizou will perform classic cover songs inspired by soul music. In June she will do a tribute concert for Vasilis Karras at Kallimarmaro once again, and a few days later she will be nominated in the MAD VMA in the category of Best Pop Song award with "Update".

Paparizou is currently working on her 11th studio album, commencing a new era in her music after her recent divorce. Her brand new song, the lead single from the album is called "Kalinihta" produced by Teo Tzimas released by Minos EMI on 10 July.

Paparizou returned for Season 11 of The Voice of Greece in late 2025 and was the winning mentor for the second time when her artist Konstantinos Komodromos won the season.

The first five months of 2026 were an intensive period of preparation with major announcements for Helena Paparizou, preparing for a summer with major domestic and international projects. From January 7 to April 29 Takis Zaharatos (singer & comedian) collaborated with Helena in a cabaret jazz show at NOX Athens presenting a performance which was organized for the first time in Greek nightlife.

She released a soundtrack about baterry commercial titled To Kalo Epistrefi (The Good Is Returning). Her brand-new single for her new era titled "Alithia Tora" (released via Minos EMI). It is an up-tempo pop track with a modern sound, an infectious beat, and an uplifting character—exactly the style Elena champions best. This track serves as the central theme for her upcoming steps and is tailor-made for radio, clubs, and summer live shows. Her musical identity was strongly tied back to her 2005 winning hit, "My Number One," due to her involvement in both the upcoming tour and the Eurovision Cruise. Additionally, in May, she had a symbolic presence at Eurovision 2026 by lending the iconic lyre from her 2005 performance to Greece's representative, Akylas, to use on stage. In May, her big return to the stage of the MAD Video Music Awards 2026 (scheduled for June) was locked in. She is set to perform an impressive live act based on her new single "Alithia Tora". Behind the scenes, her personal Greek summer tour, titled "Alithia Tora | Summer Tour 2026," was fully organized. The first dates were revealed in late May, with the official kickoff scheduled for May 31 in Katerini (Almira Beach), officially launching her concert season visiting 8 Greek cities in total.

October finds Helena Paparizou back in the red chair as a coach on the 12th season of The Voice of Greece, alongside Christos Mastoras, Panos Mouzourakis and Paola. At the same time, she is preparing for her winter live performances alongside Nikos Oikonomopoulos at COR, Athens. In addition, her 11th studio album is set to be released in December by Minos EMI and will feature a total of 12 tracks.

== Musical style and performance ==
=== Influences ===
Paparizou performing material from Vrisko To Logo Na Zo in Lamia, Greece, as part of her Arhizei To Party tour on 28 August 2008

Paparizou has said that her parents had no musical background and the only person in her family who sang was her paternal grandmother, who inspired Paparizou to sing. Paparizou's first musical experiences were with international music—predominantly musical; her musical roots are in traditional Greek music such as laiko and rebetiko because she was exposed to the music of Vassilis Tsitsanis, Markos Vamvakaris, Stelios Kazantzidis, Mimis Plaisas, and Giannis Spanos. As a child, Paparizou considered those genres to be distant and old-fashioned, and associated them with her summer holidays in Greece. In her teenage years, she listened to a broad range of music, including R&B and soul. Her biggest musical influences were female pop singers, including Madonna, Céline Dion, Tina Turner, Janet Jackson and Diana Ross. Later, she was influenced by her frequent collaborator Paschalis Terzis, who taught her to improve her technical vocal skills. Paparizou has also stated that she was a big fan of the Eurovision Song Contest for years before she first participated in 2001.

=== Music and themes ===
During her solo career, Paparizou has changed her musical style from laiko, to pop and rock-inspired styles on a whim. Some critics attribute this to a lack of personal style and following trends for commercial success rather than as an artistic expression. Paparizou has been known to follow the trends of international female pop stars; music critics have compared songs like "The Light in Our Soul" to Celine Dion, "Let's Get Wild" to Anastacia, "Gigolo" and "Carpe Diem (Seize the Day)" to Shakira, "Somebody's Burning (Put the Fire Out)" to Beyoncé Knowles, and "Dancing Without Music" to Kylie Minogue c. Aphrodite (2010). She had also great reputation in Italy.

Similar to Antique's work, all of Paparizou's albums have included cover versions and translations. Following Antique's blending of traditional Greek music with Nordic disco sounds, Paparizou's debut solo album Protereotita focused on pop sounds and laiko, and the songs were directed towards the club market. Giorgos Mastorakis of Music Corner stated that despite the image change, the album was similar to those of Antique, being described as "pop moments (with keen laiko ... 'garnish')". The album featured songs from both Greek and Swedish writers, which according to Mastorakis, led to the album's sound varying. The stylistically interesting songs from the album includes the title track, which followed an R&B style, while the song "Katse Kala" was described as having an "original sound."

Following her Eurovision win, Paparizou's popularity increased and she was often promoted as a pop singer by the media. In his review of the Euro Edition of Protereotita, Pavlos Zervas of Music Corner was impressed with the album and said that its contemporary style could potentially be an international hit, supporting the singer more so in English-language recordings. In his review of Iparhi Logos, Zervas said that apart from Sakis Rouvas—Greece's pop performer—Paparizou was the only artist supporting the pop/dance genre so well in Greece. He also said that anything that she chose to sing would become a hit. He used Paparizou to illustrate that big name producers like Giorgos Theofanous and Phoebus are not needed to create hits. Zervas said that the numerous covers were the album's strong point, while "Gigolo" was characterized by "witty" lyrics in an overall pattern that followed her hit "Mambo!" and previous hits. He said that the album's laiko material contradicted the pop songs and made her overall sound less focused.

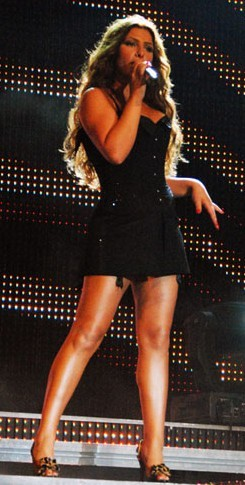
Paparizou performing on the Fisika Mazi tour on 30 June 2010 in Athens

Paparizou's second English-language album The Game of Love was anticipated by Greek consumers and featured a similar sound to Iparhi Logos; over half of the album's material was taken from the latter album. Zervas also reviewed this album, saying that it contained many different styles such as dance, hip hop, slow jams and Latin, following a typical recipe of American music. Zervas said that international female pop singers did not have much above Paparizou, and that the album's success would depend solely upon promotion efforts, although internationally affiliated record companies were less impressed. Zervas' impression was that while he believed in the material's potential, he thought that if Paparizou continued her current trends and performance style at laiko nightclubs, her ambitions for an international career would come to a disappointment.

For Vrisko To Logo Na Zo, her fourth album, Paparizou minimized the laiko influences and changed to a pop/rock sound and image in contrast to her previous albums. Evianna Nikoleri of Music Corner said that the album was carefully crafted and had a good, European-like production. For Giro Apo T' Oneiro, Paparizou worked with the same group she had two years before, with small changes. She toned down the image she had created with her previous album; while many of the songs have rock influences and some songs include dance-pop and pop-folk, electronic and lounge music elements, with an overall pop theme.

Paparizou has written two tracks on all of her studio albums except Iparhi Logos; she also wrote the lyrics of the Antique song "Why?". These writing ventures were mostly collaborations with at least one other songwriter. She contributed lyrics to "Treli Kardia" (Protereotita), "Carpe Diem" and "Teardrops" (The Game of Love), and "Mathe Prota N'agapas" (Vrisko To Logo Na Zo), while she made her first musical contributions to Vrisko To Logo Na Zo, "Den Tha 'Mai 'Do" and "Filarakia" (Giro Apo T' Oneiro)—her first solo writing credit.

Around 2013, Paparizou released her fifth Greek-language album titled Ti Ora Tha Vgoume?. The music theme of this CD was similar to her previous with more pop, ballads and folk modern songs. Her next English album One Life followed pure pop sound while Ouranio Toxo in 2017 was a total bunch of mix kinds like pop, dance, ballads, folk and more containing in total 21 tracks.

In 2021, with Apohrosis album Helena presented a mix of pop, folk, pop folk, 80's pop sounds.

In 2025, Helena with her Update CD she is diving into r'n'b pop ethnic elements.

=== Vocal style ===
Paparizou has the vocal range of mezzo-soprano; from her Antique years until 2005, she performed in a vocal range of C_{3} to B♭_{5}. Her vocal timbre has been described as "deep, sensual", "dramatic" and "metallic". Critics have frequently debated over whether laïko or pop material best suits her voice; while some found her equal in both genres, Greek critics tended to prefer her pop and dance repertoire and often that in English. This was partially caused by expectations arising from Paparizou's Swedish upbringing and Eurovision win. Also, having been raised abroad, her accent in English was different than that of a native Greek speaker. Native listeners of Western music contradicted this view; Swedish critic Dan Backman of Svenska Dagbladet said that Paparizou was no exception to the rule that musical artists sound better in their native languages, describing her vocal performances as "expressive" in Greek and "bland" in English. He also consistently selected her pure laïko songs, such as "Stin Kardia Mou Mono Thlipsi", "I Zoi Sou Zari", "M'angaliazei To Skotadi" and "O, ti Axizi Einai I Stigmes", as suiting her voice best; he said it may possess "the right dramatic nerve" for the style.

A writer for Nitro was skeptical of Paparizou's musical ability, writing in a piece titled "If the World Was Fair" that her image and the aid of backing vocalists should be recognized as playing a significant role for Paparizou. Pavlos Zervas of Music Corner wrote favourably of her voice; he said that on the Euro Edition EP, it was "adaptable" and "pliable" to the necessities of each of the songs, from the ballads to the uptempo ones. Critic Georgia Laimou of Eleftheros Typos disagreed with Zervas. Laimou found her deliveries monotonous and possessing no nuances between songs and styles. She also said that Paparizou's limited range meant she had to repeat a similar set of notes. Paparizou's tendency to strain her voice through oversinging—specifically shouting—which grew worse with age has been a common complaint. Laimou said that particularly after her Eurovision victory, Paparizou sang with a new-found confidence and force. Circa 2008, critics noticed an improvement in her voice and said that the album Vrisko To Logo Na Zo contained her best vocal performance.

Compared to her previous simplistic tunes, Vrisko To Logo Na Zo presented Paparizou with more challenging material. However, as the difficulty of the songs progressed, her excessive shouting became noticeable as a result of having to push her voice further because of insufficient volume and high notes. Although most critics agree that her "vigorous" interpretations reduce the quality of her songs, on occasion her style has served to augment the entertainment factor. Kalamaris, who said her 2008 and 2010 albums were very dull and mediocre, wrote that Paparizou was "able to give life to even the most boring tracks with her delivery".

== Image ==
=== Fashion and style ===
During her career with Antique, Paparizou had a simplistic look, representing a young girl; after going solo she made a transition into a more feminine and sexualized style. Paparizou was known for wearing revealing clothes, which was a contrast from her "good girl" image. Her signature look was hot pants, showcasing her legs as her most prominent physical feature. She also wore mini-dresses and five-inch high heels. To promote her album Vrisko To Logo Na Zo, Paparizou adopted a rock-inspired image, appearing aggressive in dark tones of clothing and make-up. The look was completed with multiple piercings, including her ears, tongue and most notably her nostril, on which she wore a wire chain connected to her ear piercing.

Evianna Nikoleri said that Paparizou was following the concurrent trend of pop/laiko female singers promoting a rock image—a trend she credited to Despina Vandi. Makis Kalamaris of Avopolis also said Paparizou's new image was for mainstream success rather than artistic expression, and added that Paparizou—knowing her limitations—was slowly easing into it rather than suddenly presenting a rock persona. Kalamaris also said that Paparizou was probably the only Greek female singer able to imitate the trends of international females without singing in skiladiko clubs and cloning herself into Madonna, which made her stand out against the concurrent mainstream scene. Paparizou's make-up artist Giannis Marketakis stated that Paparizou always gives input to her look and fashion, and closely follows fashion trends. Paparizou said that she avoids extremes in her fashion choices. In The Game of Love, Paparizou gives credit to her stylist Al Giga for making her love fashion and herself, while she also acknowledges Roberto Cavalli—who has provided most of her wardrobe since Eurovision 2005—for his input.

=== Public image ===
Paparizou established a public image described as that of the "Greek every-girl" or the "girl next door", making her an icon for teenagers. Her songs have become a staple for young people during auditions at reality music shows such as Greek Idol, and she has inspired younger artists such as Idol runner-up Nicole Paparistodimou. Paparizou became known for the way she approached the media; she has been known to apologize in her interviews, laugh throughout, and "embodies the good girl and not the femme fatale, she wants to be likeable" and projects an image of "child-woman", staying family-friendly. During her role as a television personality, Paparizou became known for frequent outbursts of cackling laughter.

Paparizou has spoken candidly to reporters about her personal life, plastic surgery, and weight. She has been referred to as an "anti-star"; A biography of Paparizou on Alpha TV's Kafes Me Tin Eleni stated that her appeal was not her voice, her songs or her body, but that she represents the qualities and limitations of the average person. Paparizou has said that she likes to present herself in moderation; she ranked her star power in the Greek star system as moderate, the level she finds appropriate for artists. She also said she believed her public image would never be able to overcome that of the girl next door in the eyes of the Greek public. E! Entertainment Television described her as "sultry", ranking her at number 16 on their 25 Sexiest Women and 25 Sexiest Pop Divas of 2008, making her one of only two Greek celebrities—along with Kostas Martakis—to be featured on one of the network's lists. In 2009, she underwent breast augmentation at the age of 26 after wishing to do so since she was 18—the first Greek celebrity to admit having done so.

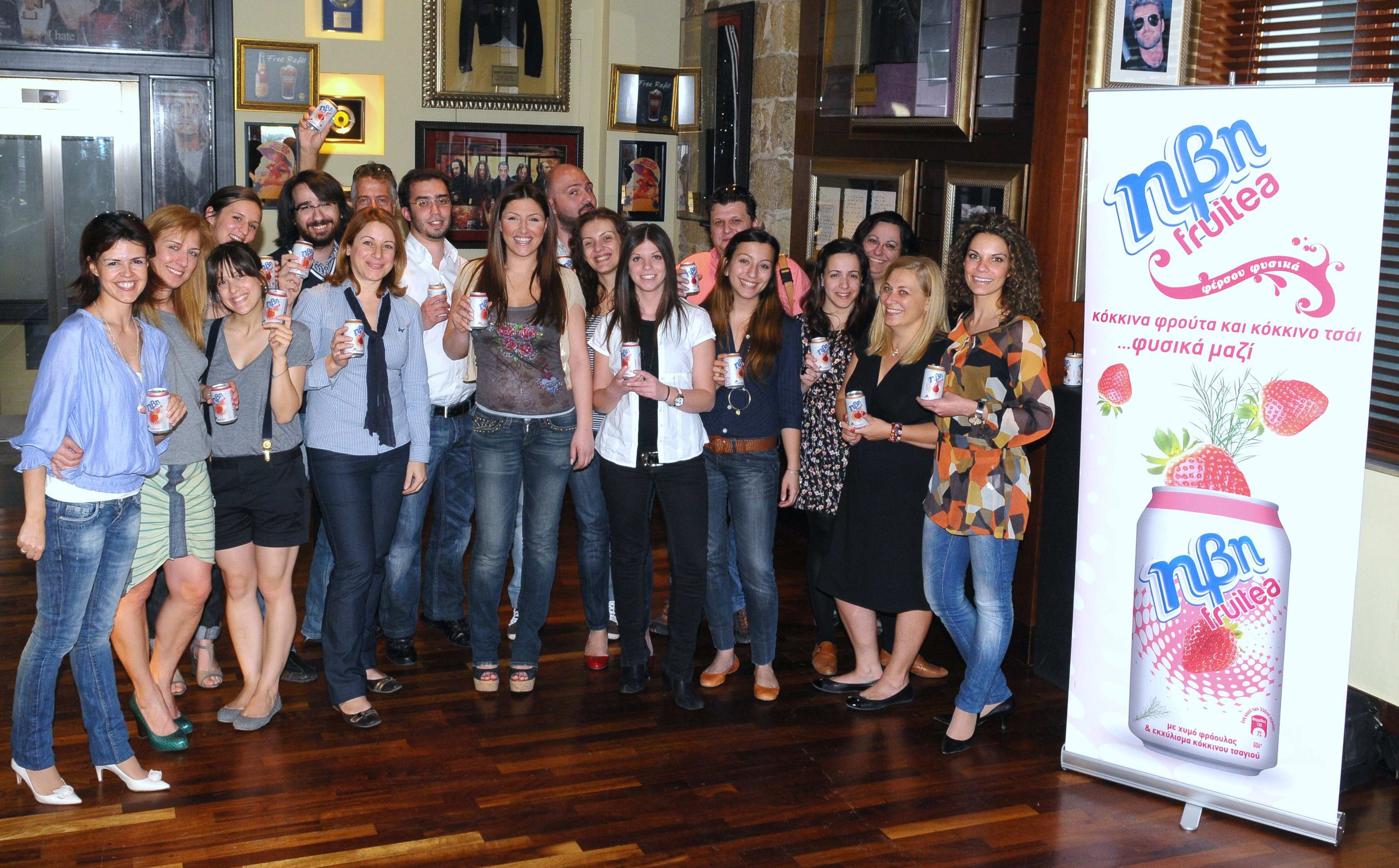
Paparizou with fans at the launch of a promotional campaign at the Hard Rock Café in Athens on 29 April 2010

Paparizou performed as the main act at the artistic portion of the Athens Pride 2010 LGBT event. She has had promotional deals with Skechers, Nokia, Organics Hair Care and Ivi, and through record label association has promoted Sony Ericsson in both Greece and Sweden, TIM Hellas, Vivodi, and Coca-Cola. Ivi reportedly selected her to be the face of its "Fersou Fisika" (act natural) campaign because she represented qualities such as freshness, naturalness, authenticity, goodwill and humor.

In 2008, Paparizou—who was known for her slim figure—was scrutinized for gaining weight during the 2007–08 season when she took a break from performing. Paparizou said she had gained 10 kilograms (22 lb); however she had already lost 7 kilograms (15 lb). She had previously stated that she gains at least that amount every time she goes on a break and that she could possibly gain up to 15 kilograms (33 lb). In 2006, she said she was dissatisfied with discriminative ideals towards both men and women, and threatened to gain weight the following year. This was followed by another weight gain in 2009. As the media became more concerned with her weight, Paparizou expressed her disapproval of this, stating "I am a singer, not a model." Paparizou also faced scrutiny for her weight during Eurovision 2001, where media reported that she suffered from anorexia nervosa. Paparizou said that for her appearance in the contest, she had lost too much weight, dropping to 51 kilograms (112 lb).

== Accolades ==
On 14 March 2010, Alpha TV ranked Paparizou as the 14th most-certified female artist in the history of Greece's recording industry on a list titled the "30 Most Popular Greek Female Singers of the Past 50 Years," with seven Platinum records and four Gold records. Paparizou was the youngest artist on the list, the only one under 30 and the only one to emerge in the 2000s (decade) in her solo career.^{a} In 2010, Forbes listed her as the 21st most powerful and influential celebrity in Greece, and the fourth highest ranked singer. She is regarded as the most successful female pop singer of the second half of the 2000s (decade).

== Personal life ==
Paparizou at one point during her youth followed Buddhism, but eventually began following Eastern Orthodoxy because she believes it suits her better. She was involved in a long-term relationship with fellow Swedish-born Greek Toni Mavridis, to whom she was introduced by a friend of her sister at a restaurant when she was 17, while Mavridis is 11 years her senior.

On 25 December 2008, Paparizou's father died suddenly from a heart attack during the family's Christmas Day celebrations in Backa, Gothenburg. Paparizou stopped her performances at Iera Odos in Greece to be with family in Sweden before resuming her show. She later said she believed that her father would have lived if the ambulance had been prompt, blaming medical incompetency. According to medical authorities the ambulance could not enter the area without police protection because it was considered a 'no-go area'. After her father's death, Paparizou suffered from depression, citing it as the second occurrence since she was a teenager.

In October 2012, Paparizou started dating the civil engineer Andreas Kapsalis. They got married secretly in Sweden in mid-2015. In 2025 they announced their separation.

== Discography ==
Studio albums

- Protereotita (2004)
- My Number One (2005)
- Iparhi Logos (2006)
- The Game of Love (2006)
- Vrisko To Logo Na Zo (2008)
- Giro Apo T' Oneiro (2010)
- Ti Ora Tha Vgoume? (2013)
- One Life (2014)
- Ouranio Toxo (2017)
- Apohrosis (2021)

with Antique

- Mera Me Ti Mera (1999)
- Die for You (2001)
- Me Logia Ellinika (2002)
- Alli Mia Fora (2003)
- Blue Love (2003)

== Filmography ==
=== Television ===
Title	Year	Role	Notes
Ellinikos Telikos	2001	Herself / Contestant	As Antique Winner
Eurovision Song Contest	2001	Herself / Contestant	As Antique Greek entrant; 3rd place
Piatsa Kolonaki	2004	Herself / Guest star	Television acting debut
Taksidevontas Stin Stockholmi Me Tin Elena Paparizou	2004	Herself	Television special
Ellinikos Telikos	2005	Herself	Internal selection
Eurovision Song Contest	2005	Herself / Contestant	Greek entrant Winner
Congratulations: 50 Years of the Eurovision Song Contest	2005	Herself / Performer	Greek entrant 4th place
Melodifestivalen	2006	Herself / Performer	Interval act
Eurovision Song Contest	2006	Herself / Performer	Opening and interval act
European Border Breakers Award	2007	Herself / Performer	Interval act and award winner
Dancing on Ice	2011–; 2012	Herself / Judge	Season 1 of the Greek version of the Dancing on Ice
Melodifestivalen	2012	Herself / Performer	Interval act
Let's Dance	2012	Herself / Contestant	Season 7 of the Swedish version of the Strictly Come Dancing 9th place
Eurosong	2013	Herself / Performer	Interval acts in the Greek national final for the Eurovision Song Contest 2013
Melodifestivalen	2014	Herself / Contestant	4th place
Eurosong	2015	Herself / Performer	Interval acts in the Greek national final for the Eurovision Song Contest 2015
Eurovision Song Contest	2015	Herself / Spokesperson	Greek spokesperson
Inför Eurovision Song Contest	2016	Herself / Commentator	Season 15 of the Swedish TV show
The Voice of Greece	2016– present	Herself / Coach	Seasons 3-12 of the Greek version of The Voice
Junior Music Stars	2016	Herself / Guest mentor	
Het Grote Songfestivalfeest	2019	Herself	Video message
Eurovision: Europe Shine a Light	2020	Herself	Video appearance
Eurovision Song Contest	2021	Herself / Performer	Interval act in the final
Het Grote Songfestivalfeest	2022	Herself / Performer	Solo and as Antique
Eurovision Song Contest	2024	Herself / Performer / Spokesperson	Interval act in the second semi-final Greek spokesperson
Ethnikos Telikos	2025	Herself / Presenter	Host & interval act in the Greek final for the Eurovision Song Contest 2025

=== Theater ===
Title	Year	Role	Notes
Nine	2015–; 2016	Saraghina	Pantheon Theater

== Tours and residencies ==
=== Concert tours ===
Headlining tour

- Helena Paparizou European Tour (2005)
- To Party Arhizei (2008)
- Fysika Mazi (with Onirama) (2010)
- Helena Paparizou & Melisses Live (2012)
- Summer Tour 2016 (with Mironas Stratis, and Isaias Matiaba) (2016)
- Ouranio Toxo Live (with Anastasios Rammos) (2018)
- Helena Paparizou Summer Tour (2022)
- Helena Paparizou Summer Tour (2023)
- Helena Paparizou Summer Tour (2024)
- Helena Paparizou Summer Tour (2025)
- Alitheia Tora Summer Tour (2026)

Promotional tour

- My Number One - Eurovision Promo Tour (2005)
- European Concerts (2006–2007)
- Helena Paparizou Live in Cyprus (2011)
- Greek Summer Concerts (2013)
- Swedish Concerts (2013–2014)
- Summer Concerts (2019)
- European Concerts (2025)

Co-headlining tour

- North American and Australian Tour (with Nikos Kourkoulis) (2005)
- Playmen VS Helena Paparizou Club Tour (with Playmen) (2012)
- Julgalan 2014 (with Danny Saucedo, Alcazar, Mattias Andreasson, E-type, Erik Segerstedt, Linda Bengtzing, and Albin) (2014)
- Diggiloo (with Magnus Carlsson, Martin Stenmarck, Charlotte Perrelli, Andreas Johnson, Björn Kjellman, Hanna Hedlund, Oskar Bly, Jessica Andersson, and Magnus Johansson) (2015)
- Summer Tour 2017 (with Despina Vandi) (2017)
- Summer Live 2018 (with Antonis Remos) (2018)
- I Mousiki Einai Zoi Summer Tour 2019 (with Marinella, Kostas Makedonas, and Ivi Adamou) (2019)
- Oloi Ena (with Tamta) (2021)
- Gia Ola Ikani (with Melisses & Marseaux) (2024)

Opening act

- Live at Last Tour (opening act for Anastacia) (2005)
- Live Concert in Athens (opening act for Diana Ross) (2025)

=== Concert residencies ===
Headlining residency

- Thalassa: People's Stage (with Stavento, Panagiotis Rafailidis, and 15:50) (2009)
- Thalassa: People's Stage (with Loukas Giorkas, and 15:50) (2009–2010)
- Kajskjul 8 (with Claes Malmberg, and Jan Malmsjö) (2016)
- Votanikos (with Giorgos Sabanis, and Anastasia) (2022–2023)
- Notes Live (Cyprus) (with Konstantinos Christoforou) (2024–2025)

Co-headlining residency – primary act

- Thalassa (with Apostolia Zoi, Nino, and Thanos Petrelis) (2004)
- Fever (with Giorgos Tsalikis, and Christos Pazis) (2005–2006)
- Iera Odos (with Paschalis Terzis, and Nino) (2006–2007)
- Odeon (with Paschalis Terzis, and Nino) (2007)
- Iera Odos (with Paschalis Terzis, and Manos Pirovolakis) (2008–2009)
- Diogenis Studio (with Antonis Remos) (2010–2011)
- Pyli Axiou (with Giannis Parios) (2011–2012)
- Votanikos (with Natasa Theodoridou, and Lefteris Pantazis) (2012–2013)
- Estate (with Sakis Rouvas, and Stelios Rokkos) (2019–2020)
- NOX (with Takis Zacharatos) (2026)

Co-headlining residency – secondary act

- Pyli Axiou (with Marinella, Kostas Makedonas, Ivi Adamou, and Tsahourides Brothers) (2018–2019)
- Diogenis Studio (with Marinella, Kostas Makedonas, Ivi Adamou, and Tsahourides Brothers) (2019)

Opening act

- Studio Piraios (with Antonis Remos, and Giannis Spanos) (2003–2004)
- Fever (with Sakis Rouvas, and Giorgos Mazonakis) (2004–2005)

== Awards ==
Paparizou has been awarded three Arion Music Awards, a European Border Breakers Award, 35 MAD Video Music Awards—more than any other artist—and an MTV Europe Music Award.

== See also ==
- Eurovision Song Contest winners discography
- List of Eurovision Song Contest winners
- List of Greeks
- List of number-one singles (Sweden)
- List of Swedes
- Music of Italy
- Schlager

Awards and achievements
Preceded by Thalassa with "Mia krifi evesthisia"	Greece in the Eurovision Song Contest (as Antique); 2001	Succeeded by Michalis Rakintzis with "S.A.G.A.P.O."
Preceded by Sakis Rouvas with "Shake It"	Greece in the Eurovision Song Contest; 2005	Succeeded by Anna Vissi with "Everything"
Preceded by (Ukraine) Ruslana with "Wild Dances"	Winner of the Eurovision Song Contest; 2005	Succeeded by (Finland) Lordi with "Hard Rock Hallelujah"
Preceded by (Norway) Adelén	OGAE Second Chance Contest winner 2014	Succeeded by (Italy) Nek
