= Ouranio Toxo (album) =

Ouranio Toxo Ουράνιο Τόξο

Studio album by Helena Paparizou
- Released: 15 December 2017
- Recorded: Bi-Kay Studio
- Genre: Dance-pop; modern laika
- Length: 69:52
- Label: Minos EMI
- Producer: Yannis Doxas

Helena Paparizou chronology
One Life (2014)	Ouranio Toxo; Ουράνιο Τόξο (2017)	Apohrosis (2021)

Singles from Ouranio Toxo
- 1. "Otan Aggeloi Klaine" Released: 22 February 2015; 2. "Misi Kardia" Released: 15 February 2016; 3. "Fiesta" Released: 27 June 2016; 4. "Agkaliase Me" Released: 9 December 2016; 5. "Haide" Released: 28 April 2017; 6. "An Me Deis Na Klaio" Released: 30 June 2017; 7. "Etsi Ki Etsi" Released: 14 December 2017

Ouranio Toxo (Greek: Ουράνιο Τόξο; English: Rainbow) is the sixth Greek-language studio album and ninth overall studio album by Greek singer Helena Paparizou, released on 15 December 2017, in Greece and Cyprus by EMI Music Greece.

== Track listing ==
Part 1. New Album
No.	Title	Lyrics	Music	Length
1.	"Sinepeis" (Συνεπείς; Consistent)	Eleana Vrahali	Basti Becks, Mark Angelo	3:09
2.	"Ouranio Toxo (Feat. Faith Erhe)" (Ουράνιο Τόξο; Rainbow)	Gabriel Russel, Issy Beats, Yannis Doxas	Gabriel Russel, Issy Beats, Yannis Doxas	3:43
3.	"Haide" (Greek version)	Phoebus	Phoebus	3:40
4.	"An Me Deis Na Klaio" (Αν Με Δεις Να Κλαίω; If you see me cry) (featuring Anastasios Rammos)	Anastasios Rammos, Pavlos Manolis	Anastasios Rammos, Diveno, Pavlos Manolis	3:39
5.	"Screen Test"	Yannis Doxas	Basti Becks, Mark Angelo	3:27
6.	"Etsi Ki Etsi" (Έτσι Κι Έτσι; So and so)	Dimitris Xipolias	Dimitris Xipolias	4:11
7.	"Tora I Pote (Ora O Mai Piú)" (Τώρα Ή Ποτέ; Now or never) (duet with Tamta)	Stavros Stavrou	Dolcenera, Finaz	3:56
8.	"Palia Mou Agapi" (Παλιά Μου Αγάπη; My old love) (featuring Mark Angelo)	Yannis Doxas	Athena Manoukian, Mark Angelo	2:55
9.	"Agkaliase Me" (Αγκάλιασέ Με; Hug me)	Fontas Theodorou	Sotiris Agrafiotis	3:42
10.	"Everlasting Love"	Gabriel Russel	Gabriel Russel	3:32
Total length:				35:54

Part 2. Songs Revisited
No.	Title	Lyrics	Music	Length
11.	"Ase Me Na Figo" (Άσε Με Να Φύγω; Let me gol) (duet with Aleka Kanellidou)	Nikos Ellinaios	Yorgos Manikas	3:43
12.	"Poso Lipamai" (Πόσο Λυπάμαι; I'm so sorry)	Vasilis Spiropoulos, Panagiotis Papadoukas	Kostas Yannidis	3:24
13.	"Crazy Girl" (with Swingin' Cats)	Mimis Plessas	Mimis Plessas	2:28
14.	"To Koritsi Tou Mai (Venus)" (Το Κορίτσι Του Μάη; The girl of May)	Sevi Tiliakou	Robbie van Leeuwen	2:21
15.	"Ti Einai Afto Pou To Lene Agapi (Piano Version)" (Τι Είναι Αυτό Που Το Λένε Αγάπη;What It Is that, that says love)	Yannis Fermanoglou	Takis Morakis	1:44
Total length:				13:40

Part 3. Bonus Tracks
No.	Title	Lyrics	Music	Length
16.	"Otan Aggeloi Klaine (Angel)" (Όταν Άγγελοι Κλαίνε; When angels cry)	Yannis Doxas	Amir Aly, Bobby Ljunggren, Henrik Wikström, Sharon Vaugh	3:04
17.	"Misi Kardia" (Μισή Καρδιά; Half heart)	Andy Nicolas, Yannis Doxas	Andy Nicolas, Chris Mazz	3:52
18.	"Fiesta"	Dimitris Beris	Teo Tzimas, Michael Tsaousopoulos	3:05
19.	"Haide" (featuring The Kemist) (Phoebus Remix) (Greek version)	Phoebus, The Kemist, Markela Panagiotou	Phoebus	2:54
20.	"Haide" (English version)	Markela Panagiotou	Phoebus	3:40
21.	"Misi Kardia (DJ Pantelis Remix)"	Andy Nicolas, Yannis Doxas	Andy Nicolas, Chris Mazz	3:43
Total length:				20:18

== Charts ==
Chart performance for Ouranio Toxo
Chart (2017–2018)	Peak position
Greek Albums (IFPI Greece)	1

== Certifications ==
Certifications for Ouranio Toxo
Region	Certification	Certified units/sales
Greece (IFPI Greece)	Platinum	6,000^{^}
^{^} Shipments figures based on certification alone.
