= List of alumni of Queen Mary University of London =

The following is a list of alumni of Queen Mary University of London.

== Notable alumni ==
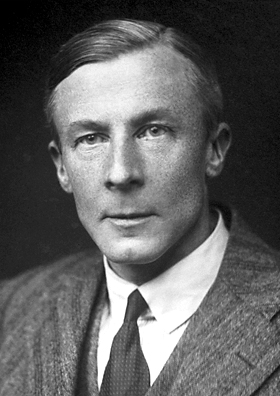
Edgar Adrian, British neuroscientist and physiologist, recipient of the 1932 Nobel Prize for Physiology

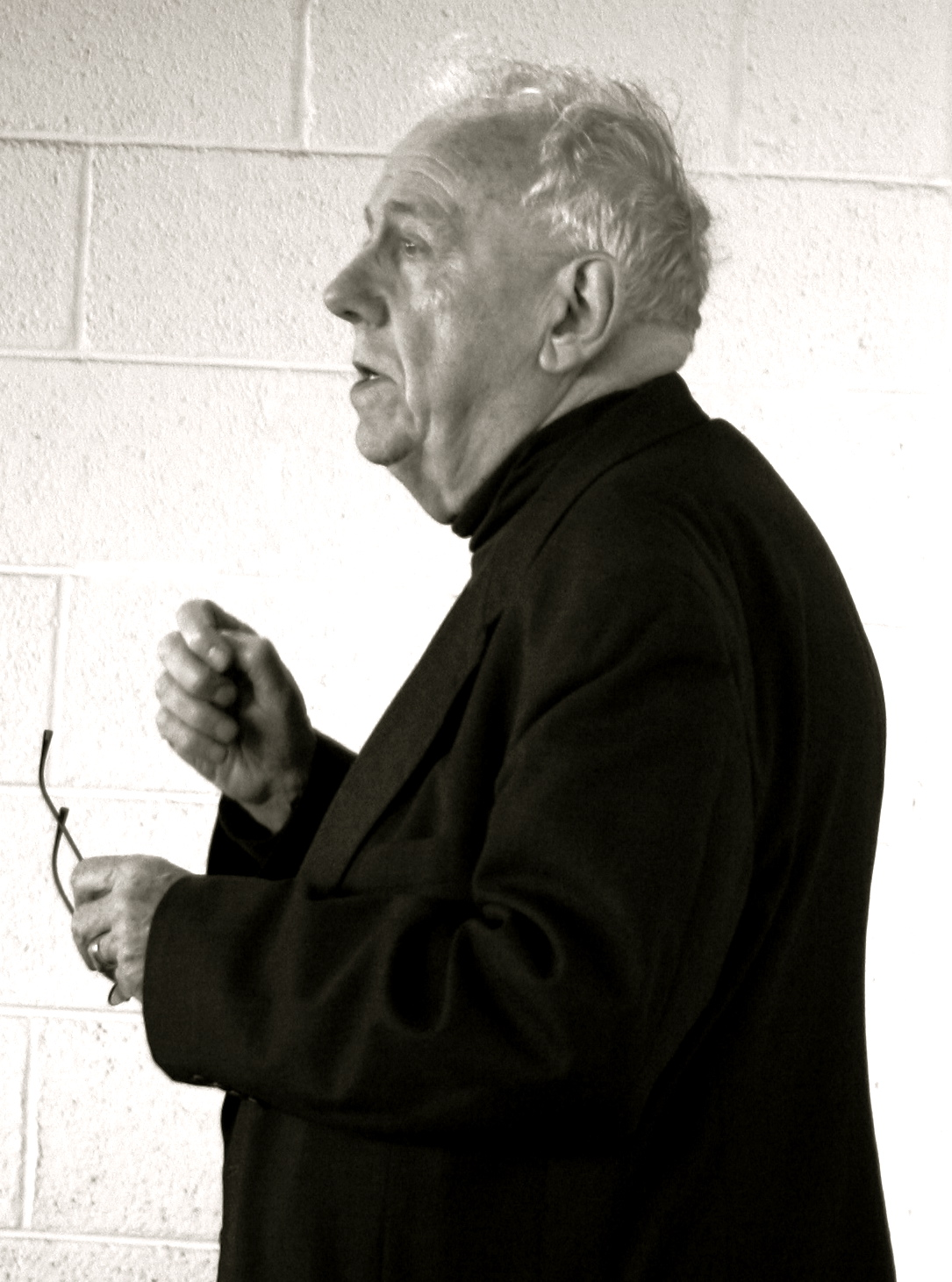
Alasdair MacIntyre, British philosopher

=== Academics ===
- Sir Gilbert Barling – British surgeon, Vice-Chancellor of the University of Birmingham
- Florence Mahoney – Gambian educator, academic, first woman to obtain a PhD from Gambia
- Sir William Turner – British anatomist, Principal of the University of Edinburgh, 1903-1916

==== Historians and philosophers ====
- Malcolm Bowie – British academic and literary critic
- Brycchan Carey – British historian and literary critic
- Eric Ives – British historian and an expert on the Tudor period
- Alasdair MacIntyre – British philosopher
- Marjorie Reeves – British historian
- Sir Roy Strong – British historian

=== Mathematicians and scientists ===
- Timothy Ball – Canadian physical geographer and climatologist
- Bill Ballantine – British-born New Zealand marine biologist
- Frederick Blackman – British botanist and plant physiologist
- John Frederick Dewey – British geologist
- David Drewry – British glaciologist and geophysicist (Geography, 1969)
- Felix Eugen Fritsch – British biologist
- William Elford Leach – British zoologist and marine biologist
- Esther Odekunle - British neurobiologist and antibody engineer
- Eleanor Mary Reid – British paleobotanist
- George Rolleston – British medical doctor, zoologist and evolutionary biologist
- Francis Rose – British botanist, conservationist, nature writer
- G. Spencer-Brown – British mathematician

==== Chemists ====
- Sir Jack Drummond – Biochemist and nutritionist
- John S. Fossey– British chemist and professor at the University of Birmingham
- John S. Fossey- British chemist
- Sir Edward Frankland – British chemist
- C. Robin Ganellin– British chemist (Chemistry, 1958)
- Julius Grant – Forensic scientist and intelligence officer who exposed forgeries through chemical analysis
- Walter Thomas James Morgan – British biochemist
- Rowland Pettit – Australian-born American chemist
- Hulda Swai - Tanzanian researcher and professor in life sciences and bioengineering (PhD in biomaterials in 2000)
- Sir John Meurig Thomas – British physical chemist
- Frank Gibbs Torto – Ghanaian chemist
- Sir Robert Watson – British chemist (PhD in atmospheric chemistry in 1973)

==== Physicists ====
- Alexander Bradshaw – British physicist
- Sir Philip Campbell – British physicist, editor-in-chief of the science journal Nature (MSc Astrophysics, 1974)
- Michael Duff – British physicist at Imperial College London (Physics, 1969)
- Geraint F. Lewis – British astrophysicist, professor of Astrophysics at the University of Sydney
- Sir Peter Mansfield – British Nobel Prize–winning physicist
- Helen Mason – British physicist
- George C. McVittie – British cosmologist
- Brendan Scaife – Irish engineer and physicist
- David Southwood – British space scientist, Senior Research Investigator at Imperial College London
- Angela Speck - Astrophysicist and Professor at the University of Missouri
- Geoffrey Ernest Stedman – New Zealand physicist
- Charles Taylor – British physicist, lecturer and author
- Sir Tejinder Virdee – British physicist
- Rosemary Wyse – British astrophysicist

=== Artists ===
- Ashley Banjo – British choreographer
- John Leech – British caricaturist
- Siddharth Mallya – Indian actor and model
- Simon C. Page – British graphic designer

==== Writers ====
- Kia Abdullah – British writer
- J. G. Ballard – British writer of Empire of the Sun and Crash
- Alia Bano – British playwright
- Stephen Barber – British writer
- Sir Malcolm Bradbury – British writer
- Robert Bridges – British poet and holder of the honour of poet laureate from 1913
- Marcus Chown – British science writer, journalist and broadcaster, cosmology consultant for New Scientist magazine
- Allan Cubitt - British playwright, screenwriter and director
- Richard Gordon – British screenwriter and writer
- Lee Harwood – British poet
- Ruth Prawer Jhabvala – British writer and Academy Award-winning screenwriter
- Clive Leo McNeir - British linguist, lexicographer and author of crime novels
- Derek Marlowe - British playwright and screenwriter (did not graduate)
- Sara Torres - Spanish poet and novelist
- Eleanor Updale – British award-winning author
- Sarah Waters – British author of Tipping The Velvet
- Guy Walters – British author, historian and journalist

==== Musicians ====
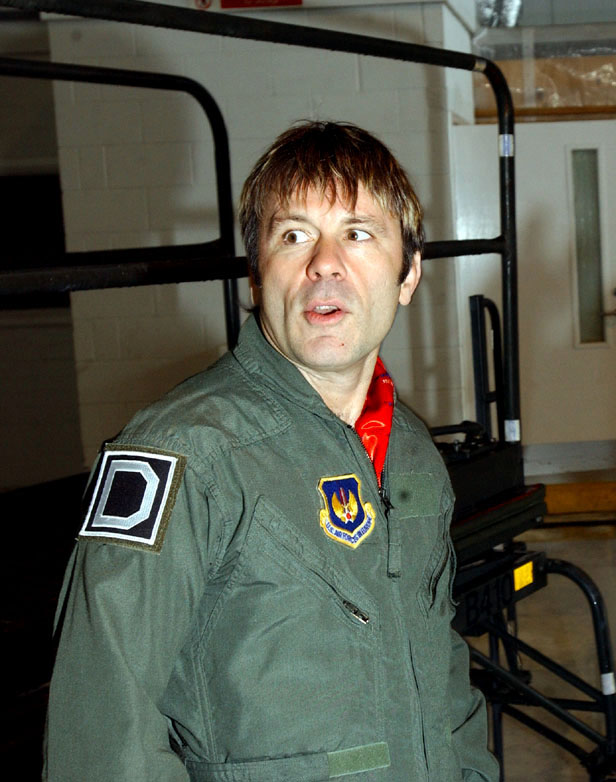
Bruce Dickinson, British singer, best known as the lead vocalist of the band Iron Maiden

- Bernard Butler – British musician, former guitarist of Suede
- Bruce Dickinson – British singer of Iron Maiden
- Pete Doherty – British musician, writer, actor, poet and artist
- Fleur East – British singer and The X Factor contestant
- Jay Sean – British singer
- Shakka – British singer
- Valanto Trifonos – Greek–Cypriot singer; winner of Greek Idol season 1

=== Businesspeople ===
- Sir Richard Broadbent – British businessman
- Sir Frank Chapman – British CEO of BG Group
- Piers Corbyn – British scientist, businessman
- Sam Houser - co-creator of Grand Theft Auto, owner of Rockstar Games
- Christopher Rawson Penfold – British businessman, founder of Penfolds, an Australian wine producer
- David Sullivan – British businessman, newspaper publisher, and football chairmen and investor

=== Technologists ===
- Samson Abramsky – British computer scientist
- Igor Aleksander – British artificial intelligence researcher
- Keith Clark – British computer scientist; Professor of Computer Science at Imperial College London
- Mary Coombs - British computer scientist, first female commercial computer programmer in the UK
- Ian Lewis – British computer scientist
- Tom Maibaum – Hungarian computer scientist

=== Engineers ===
- Kurt Berger – Finnish aviation engineer
- William Glanville – civil engineer
- George Hockham – British engineer; together with Nobel Prize winner Charles Kao, widely recognised a pioneer in the field of optical fibres (PhD Electronic Engineering, 1969)
- Ashitey Trebi-Ollennu - Ghanaian robotics engineer at NASA and chief engineer at the Jet Propulsion Laboratory

=== Lawyers and judges ===
- Dame Laura Cox – British lawyer, English High Court judge
- Sir William Davis – British lawyer, English High Court judge
- Roy Goode – British lawyer and author
- Tracey McDermott - past chief executive of Britain's Financial Conduct Authority and financial service executive
- Basil Markesinis – British lawyer
- Barbara Mensah - British judge
- Jeremy Phillips – British lawyer
- Sir Christopher Pitchford – British lawyer, Lord Justice of Appeal
- Anand Ramlogan – Trinidad and Tobago lawyer, Attorney-General of Trinidad and Tobago
- K. Sripavan – Sri Lankan lawyer, judge, the 44th and current Chief Justice of Sri Lanka
- Roger Tan Kor Mee – Malaysian lawyer

=== Actors, broadcasters and journalists ===
- Mehmet Aksoy - British - Kurdish Film Director and Editor in Chief of Kurdish Question.
- Graham Chapman – British actor, member of comedy group Monty Python
- Katia Elizarova – Russian model and actress
- Romola Garai – British actress
- Julie Gardner – British television producer responsible for Doctor Who
- Sean Gilder – British actor
- Sarah Harrison, British journalist
- Ching He Huang – British television chef
- Jane Hill – British newsreader, BBC News
- Tom Machell - British Actor and Writer
- Kasia Madera - British newsreader, BBC News
- Bill O'Reilly – American television host, author, historian, syndicated columnist and political commentator
- Claire Price – British actress
- Roger Tilling – British broadcaster and voice of University Challenge
- Prannoy Roy – Indian journalist
- Kate Williams – British broadcaster and historian
- Peter Wingfield – British actor

=== Doctors, psychiatrists and surgeons ===
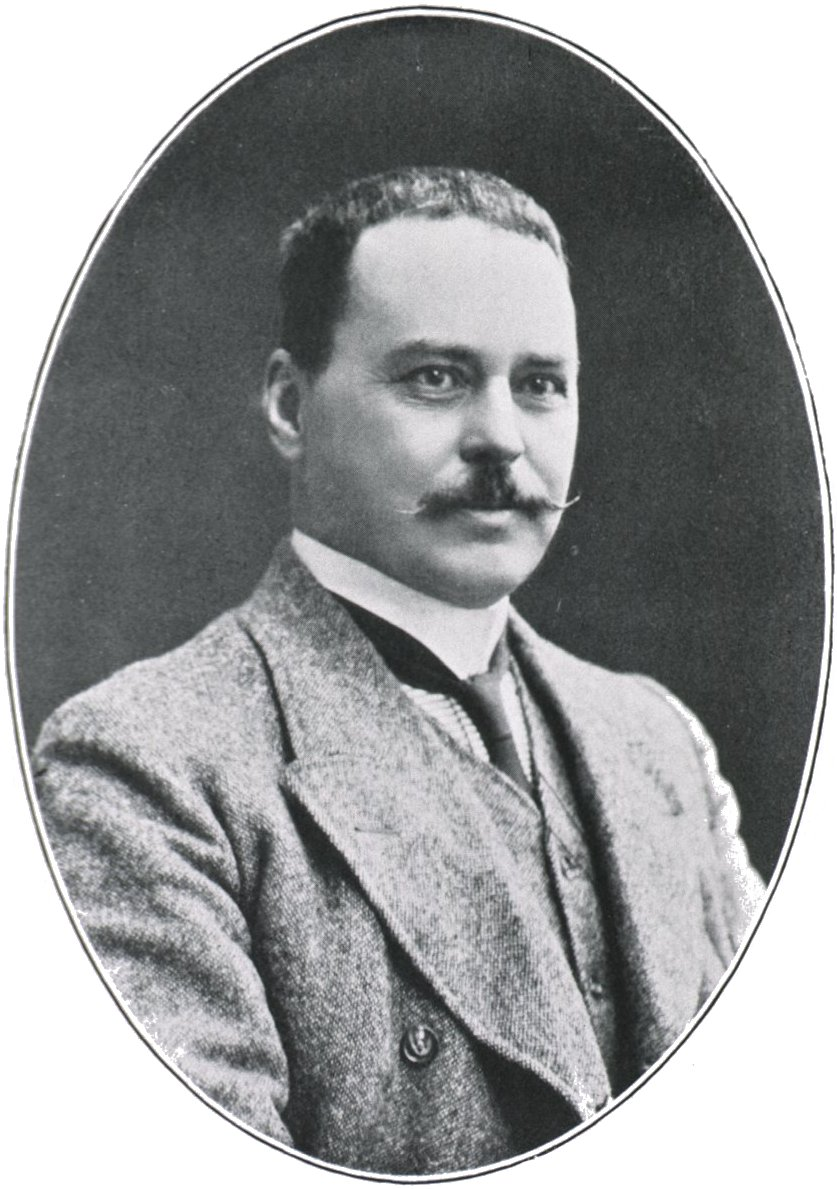
Sir Ronald Ross, British medical doctor, received the Nobel Prize for Physiology or Medicine in 1902 for his work on the transmission of malaria, becoming the first British Nobel laureate

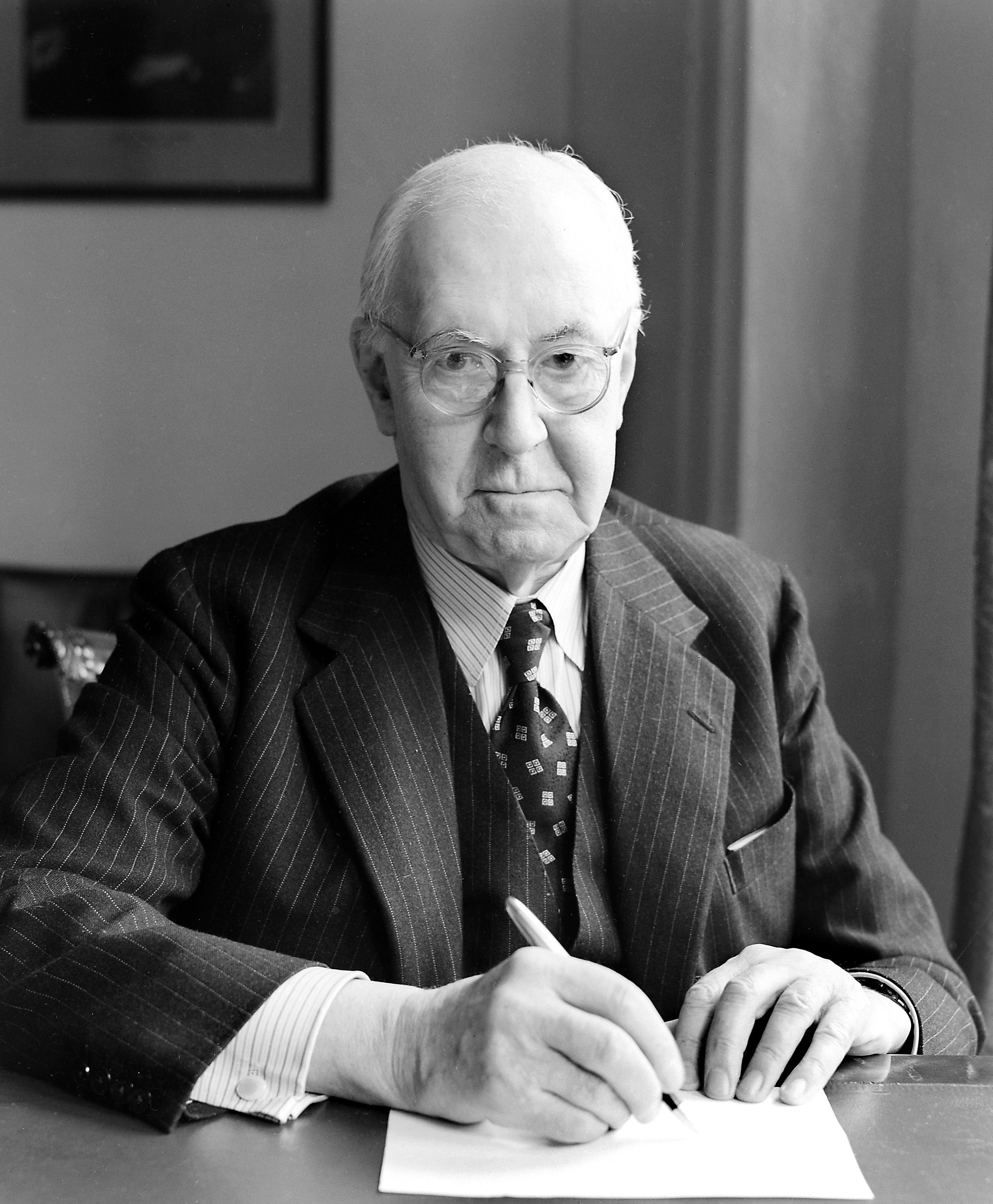
Sir Henry Hallett Dale – British pharmacologist and physiologist, shared the 1936 Nobel Prize in Physiology or Medicine

- John Abernethy – British surgeon
- Joseph Adams – British surgeon and pathologist
- Edgar Adrian – British neuroscientist and physiologist, recipient of the 1932 Nobel Prize for Physiology.
- Sir Christopher Andrewes – British virologist
- George Augustus Auden – British Professor of public health
- John Badley – British surgeon
- Edward Bancroft – British physician and double agent in the American Revolution
- Gopal Baratham – Singaporean author and neurosurgeon
- Frederick Batten – British neurologist and pediatrician
- Thomas Barnardo – Irish philanthropist
- Hannah Billig – British medical doctor
- Sir William Blizard – British surgeon, co-founded England's first clinical medical school, The London Hospital Medical College
- George Bodington – British pulmonary specialist
- Henry Edmund Gaskin Boyle – British anaesthetist
- Alfred James Broomhall – British medical missionary
- George Busk – British surgeon, zoologist and palaeontologist
- Tim Crow – British psychiatrist
- Thomas Blizard Curling – British surgeon
- Sir Henry Hallett Dale – British pharmacologist and physiologist, shared the 1936 Nobel Prize in Physiology or Medicine
- John Langdon Down – British physician; first to describe Down syndrome, a genetic disorder named after him
- Colonel Sir Weary Dunlop – Australian surgeon
- John Freke – British ophthalmic surgeon
- Sir Archibald Garrod – British physician, first to appreciate the importance of biochemistry in medicine
- Major Greenwood – British epidemiologist and statistician
- Gordon Hamilton-Fairley – British oncologist
- William Harvey – British physician who made seminal contributions in anatomy and physiology, first person to describe circulation
- James Hinton – British surgeon and author
- Ebbe Hoff – American medical doctor and academic
- Allan Victor Hoffbrand – British medical doctor and academic
- John Hunter – British surgeon and anatomist; Hunterian Society is named in his honour
- Sir Jonathan Hutchinson – British surgeon, ophthalmologist, dermatologist, venereologist and pathologist
- John Hughlings Jackson – British neurologist
- William Lawrence – British surgeon, a founder of British ophthalmology
- Andrew Lees – British neurologist
- William John Little – British orthopedic surgeon, pioneer of orthopaedic surgery
- Morell Mackenzie – British physician, pioneer of laryngology
- William Marsden – British surgeon, founder of The Royal Free and Marsden Hospitals
- Sir James Paget – British surgeon and founder of scientific medical pathology
- Stephen Paget – British surgeon, the son of the distinguished surgeon and pathologist Sir James Paget, proposed the "seed and soil" theory of metastasis
- Jonathan Pereira – British pharmacologist
- Percivall Pott – British surgeon, one of the founders of orthopedics, and the first scientist to demonstrate that a cancer may be caused by an environmental carcinogen
- W. H. R. Rivers – British psychiatrist, psychiatric anthropologist
- Sir Ronald Ross – British medical doctor, received the Nobel Prize for Physiology or Medicine in 1902 for his work on the transmission of malaria
- Elizabeth Press – British immunologist
- Sir Peter Ratcliffe – British molecular biologist
- William Scovell Savory – British surgeon
- Sir Frederick Treves, 1st Baronet – British surgeon
- Daniel Hack Tuke – British expert on mental illness
- Sir James Underwood – British pathologist
- Karen Vousden – British medical researcher
- Hugh Watkins – British cardiologist
- William James Erasmus Wilson – British surgeon
- Donald Winnicott – British paediatrician and psychoanalyst

==== Medical missionaries ====
- Albert Ruskin Cook – British medical missionary
- Sir Wilfred Grenfell – British medical missionary
- John Preston Maxwell – British medical missionary
- Robert Morrison – British medical missionary
- Frederick Howard Taylor – British medical missionary
- Herbert Hudson Taylor – British medical missionary
- Hudson Taylor – British medical missionary

=== Politicians, civil servants and Parliamentarians ===
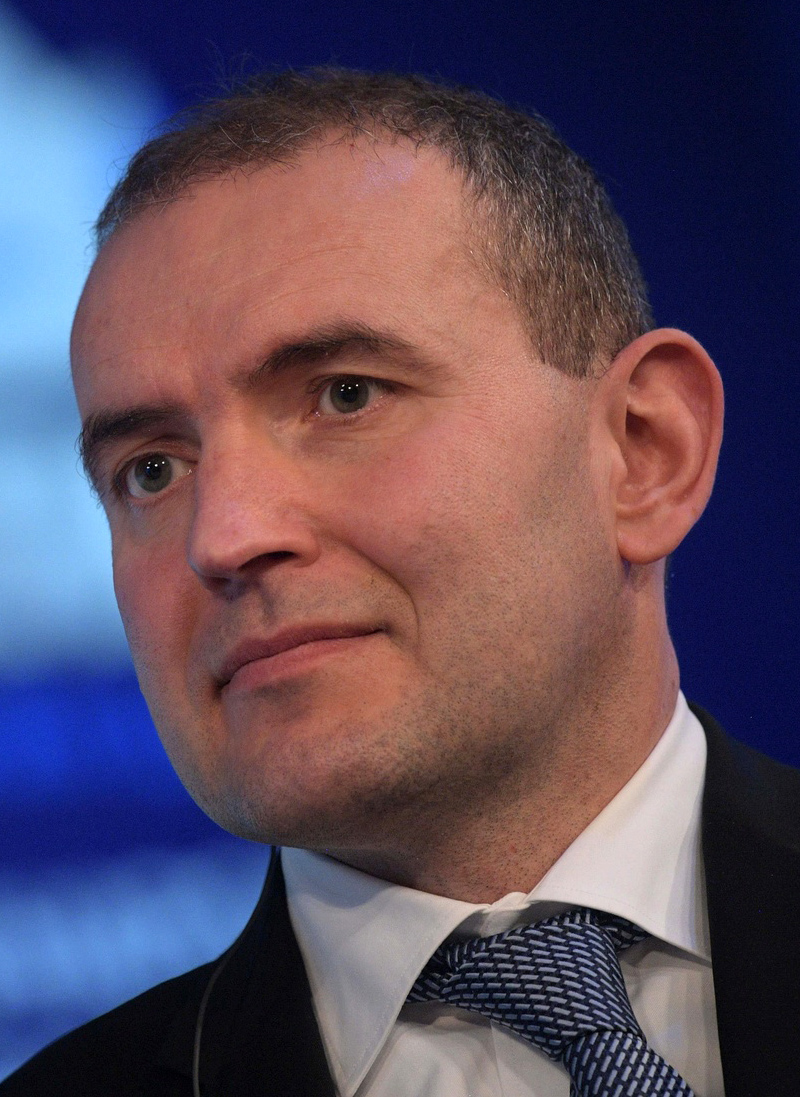
Guðni Th. Jóhannesson, Icelandic politician, historian and lecturer; President of Iceland (2016–2024)

==== Politicians ====
- Christopher Addison, 1st Viscount Addison – British politician, Labour Party Member of Parliament
- Apsana Begum – First British hijab-wearing Member of Parliament
- Sir Peter Caruana – Gibraltarian politician, Chief Minister of Gibraltar
- Pushpendra Saroj- Indian Politician, Youngest Member of Parliament of India Lok Sabha
- Lynda Chalker, Baroness Chalker of Wallasey – British politician, former Conservative Party Member of Parliament
- Mary Clancy - Canadian politician and lawyer, former Member of Parliament
- Sir William Job Collins – British politician and surgeon, Liberal Party Member of Parliament, Vice-Chancellor of the University of London
- David Currie, Baron Currie of Marylebone – British politician, member of the House of Lords
- John Cronin – British politician and surgeon, Labour Party Member of Parliament
- Marcia Matilda Falkender, Baroness Falkender – British politician, member of the House of Lords
- Sir Alan Glyn – British politician, Conservative Party Member of Parliament
- Donald McIntosh Johnson – British author and politician
- Peter Hain – British politician, Labour Party Member of Parliament, former Secretary of State for Work and Pensions and Secretary of State for Wales
- Stephen Hammond – British politician, Conservative Party Member of Parliament and former UK Government Minister
- Anthony Hamilton-Smith, 3rd Baron Colwyn – British politician
- Francis Hare, 6th Earl of Listowel – Irish British politician, member of the House of Lords
- Charles Hill, Baron Hill of Luton – British politician and former chairman of the BBC
- Guðni Th. Jóhannesson – Icelandic politician, historian and lecturer; President of Iceland (2016–2024)
- Leo Chen-jan Lee – Taiwanese politician, Vice Minister of Foreign Affairs, Taiwan
- Amin Liew Abdullah – Bruneian Cabinet Minister
- Esther McVey – British politician, Conservative Party Member of Parliament
- Joseph Ngute - Cameroonian politician, the 9th Prime Minister of Cameroon
- Stephanie Peacock – British Labour Party politician, the Member of Parliament for Barnsley East
- Tom Pursglove – British politician, Conservative Party Member of Parliament
- Bell Ribeiro-Addy – British Politician, Labour Party Member of Parliament for Streatham
- Janet Royall, Baroness Royall of Blaisdon – British politician, Leader of the House of Lords from October 2008 to May 2010
- Caroline Spelman – British politician, Conservative Party Member of Parliament and former Secretary of State for Environment, Food and Rural Affairs
- John Whittaker – British economics academic at Lancaster University; former politician, UKIP Member of the European Parliament

=== Administrators and civil servants ===
- David Blanchflower – British-American economist
- Dame Colette Bowe – British civil servant
- William Carr – British-Australian admiral
- Simon Case – British civil servant
- Sir Curtis Keeble – British ambassador to the USSR
- Sir Michael Lyons – British chairman of the BBC Trust
- Davidson Nicol – Sierra Leonean academic and diplomat, Permanent Representative of Sierra Leone to the United Nations, High Commissioner to the United Kingdom and Under-Secretary-General of the United Nations
- Dame Veronica Sutherland – British ambassador, sixth President of Lucy Cavendish College, Cambridge, and former ambassador to the Republic of Ireland
- Martin Uden – British ambassador to South Korea
- Princess Laurentien of the Netherlands – Dutch royalty, Vice-President of Fauna & Flora International, Chair of the European Cultural Foundation

=== Clergy and religious leaders ===
- Joyce M. Bennett – British Anglican priest and member of the Anglican clergy (first Englishwoman to be ordained a priest in the Anglican Communion)
- Pamela Evans – British medical doctor and Christian writer
- Martyn Lloyd-Jones – British evangelical Christian religious leader

=== Sportspeople ===
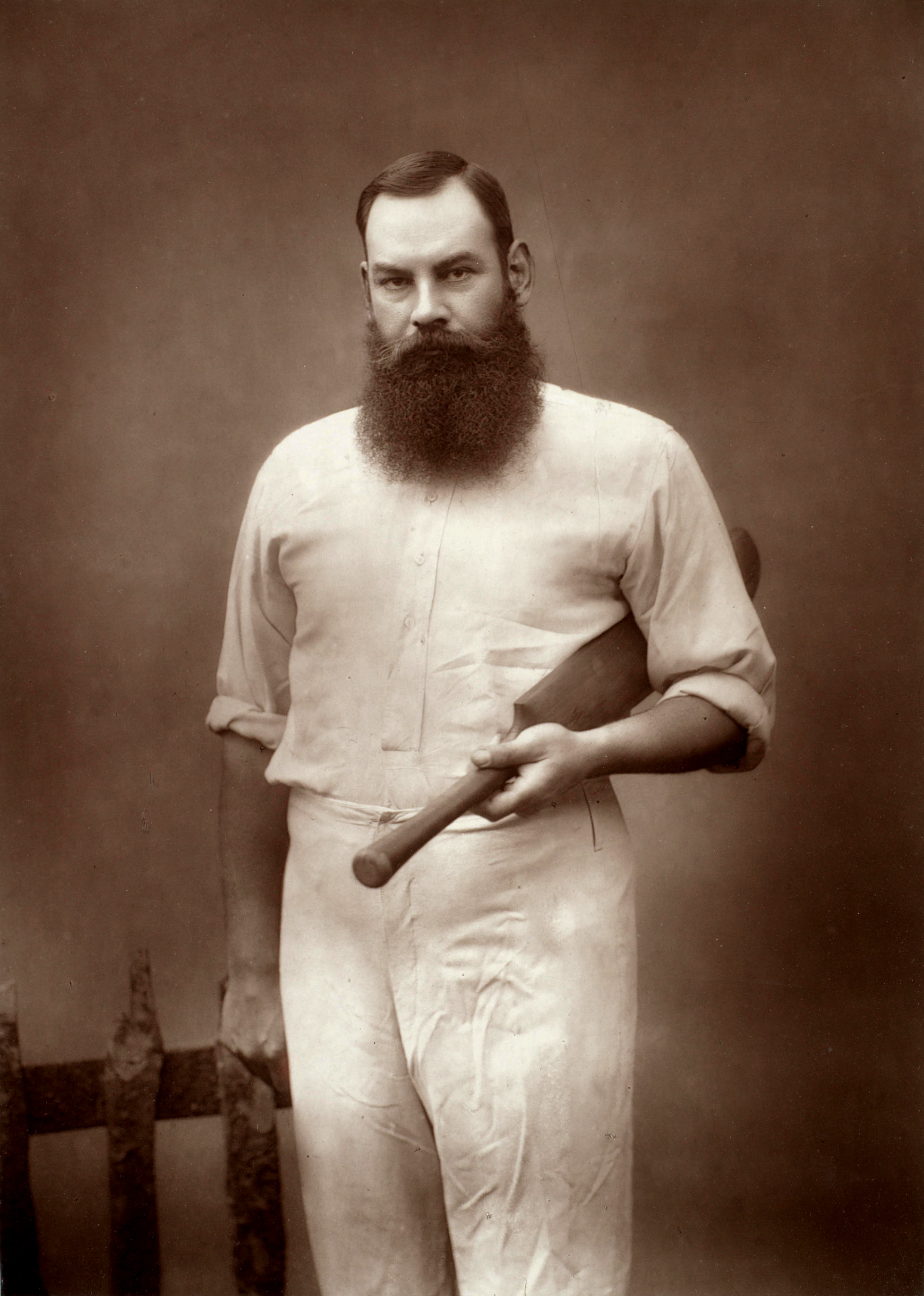
W. G. Grace, British cricketer

- Richard Budgett – British gold medal-winning Olympic rower
- Martin Cross – British gold medal-winning Olympic rower
- W. G. Grace – British cricketer
- Mike Hennessy – British Olympic rower
- Jimmy Hill – British footballer, football manager, TV presenter
- William Hughes - Welsh boxer
- Imran Kayani – Professional footballer and Pakistan international
- Naila Kiani – leading Pakistani female high-altitude mountaineer. She is the first Pakistani woman mountaineer to climb 10 of the 14 eight-thousanders
- Martyna Snopek – Polish paralympic rower
- Arthur Wint – Jamaican athlete, won Jamaica's first gold medal at the 1948 London Olympics in the 400 metres, and a silver medal in the 800 metres

=== Other notable alumni ===
- Ryan McKiernan, managing director of Fat Macy's Foundation
