= Antigoni Psychrami =

Antigoni Psychrami Αντιγόνη Ψυχράμη
- Also known as: Antigoni (Stage Name)
- Born: Antigoni Konstantina Psychrami; 17 January 1987 (age 39); Serres, Greece
- Genres: Pop
- Years active: 2010–present
- Labels: Sony Music Entertainment, Panik Records

Antigoni Psychrami (Greek: Αντιγόνη Ψυχράμη), commonly spelled as Antigoni Psihrami, is a Greek singer who rose to fame after her participation on the first season of the talent show Greek Idol in 2010. She subsequently released the digital single "Xamogela". In March 2011, she was one of six candidates who competed to represent Greece in the Eurovision Song Contest 2011, competing with a song titled "It's All Greek to Me".

== Eurovision 2011 ==
=== "It's All Greek to Me!" ===
Antigoni Psychrami chose the song "It's All Greek to Me!" in an attempt to represent Greece at the 2011 Eurovision. "It's All Greek to Me!" was written by Apostolos Psihramis, with lyrics by Dimitris S. and Gerard James Borg. Borg is best known for penning five entries for Malta for Eurovision competitions. The song is performed in English, and is dance-pop in style, with ethnic elements. Psychrami emerged from the first season of the reality talent show Greek Idol in 2010, and promptly signed with record label Minos EMI. Antigoni's song finished in 2nd place, after Luca's "Watch my dance", which represented Greece in the Eurovision Song Contest 2011

=== Crimea Music Fest 2011 ===
On 8 September 2011, Psychrami represented Greece on Crimea Music Fest, in Ukraine. The Crimea Music Fest is a worldwide song contest organized by Ukraine Television and Radio Programme. Psychrami reached 4th place for Greece at the fest.

== Appearances ==
Act
Year	Title	Role	Notes
1995	The Sound of Music	Young child	Theater debut, with Aliki Vougiouklaki
1997	Dalaras touring Greece	performing Papoutsia Panina	
2003	Grease, Greek Version		
2003	The Nanny, well known as H Ntanta, Greek version of nanny		1 episode
2003	Safe sex		2 episodes
2006	Little Shop of Horrors		Greek Version
2009	Rent The Musical	Mimi	
2010	Greek Idol	Herself	Eliminated in quarterfinals
2010–2012	Rent The Musical	Mimi	Also touring with the cast of Rent on Cyprus on 2011
2010	Dimitris Mitropanos-Pegi Zina	Herself	Opening programme
2011	Crimea Music Fest	Herself	Represent Greece (4th place)
2011	Oge Feat Antigoni Psychrami	Herself	Live at DC club in Athens
2012	Rent The Musical Concert	Mimi	Golden Hall Mall, Athens
2012	MAD Video Music Awards2012	Herself	Perform "Mamacita Buenna" & Suavemente

== Chart positions and certifications ==
Chart	Peak	Album
Greek Charts Digital Download	1	Hamogela Antigoni Psychrami feat Oge (Digital Download)
Cyprus Charts Digital Download	7	Hamogela Antigoni Psychrami feat Oge (Digital Download)

=== CR Radio ===
Antigoni Psychrami and her friend Nicole Paparistodimou have their own radio program on Web Radio Station C R Radio. The program is named "Sigatikoi stin Trela"(English: Crazy roommates).
