= Greek Idol season 1 =

Greek Idol
- Season 1
- Hosted by: Roula Koromila; Ada Livitsanou (audition shows)
- Judges: Petros Kostopoulos; Dimitris Kontopoulos; Maro Theodoraki; Kostas Kapetanidis
- Winner: Valanto Trifonos
- Runner-up: Nicole Paparistodimou

Release
- Original network: Alpha TV
- Original release: 5 March – 28 June 2010

Season chronology
- Next → Season 2

The first season of Greek Idol premiered on 5 March 2010 on Alpha TV.

== Judges and host ==
=== Hosts ===
A number of Greek entertainers had been rumored as potential hosts of the show, haven't gone through screen tests. On January 19, 2010, Alpha TV announced that actress Ada Livitsanou will host the show. Livitsanou had previously appeared as a guest on the season finale of rival singing competition The X Factor (Greece) where she sang "Think".

However, it was revealed on April 20, 2010, that Roula Koromila would be the new host of the show as of the April 26 when the "live shows" began. Livitsanou was still present on the show, presenting backstage segments.

=== Judges ===
Shortly after announcing the show, Alpha TV started airing a new ad on December 22, 2009, announcing Nikos Karvelas as the head judge. On January 20, 2010, it was rumored that Karvelas will not be part of Greek Idol, and had left for unknown reasons. On January 21, 2010, one day before auditions begin, Alpha TV confirmed that Karvelas has left the show, and thanked him for his work up until that point. Although Alpha TV and Karvelas did not state the reason for his departure, various news outlets reported that it was due to comments made by host Ada Livitsanou after being picked, downplaying the judges roles, and stating that the judges have little say in the competition, as well as other potential jury picks Karvelas did not agree with. On the same day, it was announced that singer Yiannis Kotsiras will be a judge on the show, but on January 23, 2010, Kotsiras revealed that he would not take part in the show and thanked Alpha for their enthusiasm with him.

On January 24, 2010, Alpha announced that the judges for the show would be songwriter Dimitris Kontopoulos, music teacher and author Maro Theodoraki, who is also the niece of composer Mikis Theodorakis, and video director Kostas Kapetanidis.

Petros Kostopoulos, media publisher and president of Imako Media S.A., served as a guest fourth guest judge to the show on April 27, 2010, with the premier of the first live shows. At the start of the second live show on May 3, 2010, it was announced that Kostopoulos would become the fourth permanent judge for the rest of the season.

== Way to the Top 15 ==
=== Auditions ===
Participants who wished to audition had to be between 16 and 32 years old. Auditions began in Thessaloniki and were held on 22, 23, and 24 January 2010 at the "Porto Palace" hotel. Auditions continued in Cyprus between 8 and 9 February 2010. The Athens auditions, were held on 12, 13, and 14 February 2010 at the "Royal Olympic Hotel" The final audition was held in Piraeus on 27 and 28 February at "Hotel Theoxenia".

=== Recall ===
The recall rounds consisted of three phases. In the first phase, the 150 contestants chosen from auditions were split up and had to sing their favorite song in front of judges, where 90 were eliminated. In the second phase, the remaining 60 contestants were split up into groups and assigned a song to sing as a group, with half were eventually eliminated. In the third and last phase, the remaining 30 contestants sang a song individually with the help of a piano, eventually being narrowed down to 15 contestants to take part in the live show.

== Live shows ==
=== Top 15 – Contestant's Favorite ===
Each contestant had to sing their favorite song. The guest performer for this episode was Yannis Ploutarchos.

Order	Contestant	Song	Result
1	Vasilis Logothetis	"Eksaireseis"	Judges
2	Christina Lakoumenta	"To Miden"	Eliminated
3	Aristeidis Komninakis	"Mehri To Telos Tou Kosmou"	Eliminated
4	Athina Lianou	"My Life Would Suck Without You"	Eliminated
5	Tania Karra	"Alitissa Psihi"	Judges
6	Gloria Oghomwen	"Take a Bow"	Safe
7	Valanto Trifonos	"Trava Skandali"	Safe
8	Ioanna Zervolea	"Hot n Cold"	Eliminated
9	Nicole Paparistodimou	"Sober"	Safe
10	Christos Tsakiris	"Etsi Ksafnika"	Safe
11	Giorgos Douros	"I Hate Myself for Loving You"	Judges
12	Diogenis Frantzanas	"To Kalitero Paidi"	Safe
13	Stergios Daousanakis	"Asimenia Sfika"	Safe
14	Antigoni Psihrami	"I'm Outta Love"	Safe
15	Dimitris Evripiotis	"Ola Giro sou Girizoun"	Eliminated

=== Top 10 – Dance Hits ===
Each contestant had to sing a Dance song. The guest performer for this episode was Despina Vandi.

Order	Contestant	Song	Result
1	Tania Karra	"I Will Survive"	Eliminated
2	Diogenis Frantzanas	"Hamogelase"	Bottom 4
3	Antigoni Psihrami	"Walking on Sunshine"	Safe
4	Vasilis Logothetis	"Smooth"	Bottom 2
5	Stergios Daousanakis	"Mia Mera Tha ΄Rtheis"	Bottom 4
6	Valanto Trifonos	"Don't Leave Me This Way"	Safe
7	Gloria Oghomwen	"Agapise Me"	Safe
8	Giorgos Douros	"Play That Funky Music"	Safe
9	Nicole Paparistodimou	"It's Raining Men"	Safe
10	Christos Tsakiris	"Horis Anapnoi"	Safe

=== Top 9 – Movie Hits ===
Each contestant had to sing a movie hit song. The guest performer for this episode was Elli Kokkinou.

Order	Contestant	Song	Result
1	Valanto Trifonos	"To Fili Tis Zois"	Safe
2	Diogenis Frantzanas	"O,ti Ki An Po"	Safe
3	Nicole Paparistodimou	"It Must Have Been Love"	Safe
4	Christos Tsakiris	"Vrehei Fotia Sti Strata Mou"	Safe
5	Giorgos Douros	"S΄agapo"	Bottom 2
6	Gloria Oghomwen	"Against All Odds"	Safe
7	Stergios Daousanakis	"Ela Psihoula Mou"	Safe
8	Antigoni Psihrami	"Afti i Nihta Menei"	Safe
9	Vasilis Logothetis	"Epikindina Se Thelo"	Eliminated

=== Top 8 – Today's Hits ===
Each contestant had to sing a current hit song. The guest performers for this episode were Nikos Oikonomopoulos and Vegas.

Order	Contestant	Song	Result
1	Gloria Oghomwen	"One Love"	Eliminated
2	Stergios Daousanakis	"I Kardia Mou"	Bottom 2
3	Giorgos Douros	"Krifa"	Safe
4	Nicole Paparistodimou	"Kopse Kai Moirase"	Safe
5	Valanto Trifonos	"Empire State of Mind (Part II) Broken Down"	Safe
6	Christos Tsakiris	"Polemao"	Safe
7	Diogenis Frantzanas	"Prin Mas Dei Kaneis"	Bottom 3
8	Antigoni Psihrami	"Paradosou"	Safe

=== Top 7 – My Idol ===
Each singer had to sing a song by their music idol. The guest performer for this episode was Tamta.

Order	Contestant	Song	Result
1	Nicole Paparistodimou	"Porta Gia Ton Ourano"	Safe
2	Christos Tsakiris	"Άponi Kardia"	Safe
3	Valanto Trifonos	"Den Thelo Na Ksereis"	Safe
4	Diogenis Frantzanas	"New York, New York"	Eliminated
5	Stergios Daousanakis	"Feel"	Bottom 2
6	Antigoni Psihrami	"Apopse Thelo Na Pio"	Safe
7	Giorgos Douros	"You Give Love a Bad Name"	Bottom 3

=== Top 6 – Rock Hits ===
Each contestant had to sing one rock song in English and the other in Greek.

Order	Contestant	Song	Result
1	Stergios Daousanakis	"Mi m΄aggizeis"	Safe
2	Antigoni Psihrami	"Like the Way I Do"	Safe
3	Christos Tsakiris	"Poso Se Thelo"	Safe
4	Valanto Trifonos	"Piece of My Heart"	Safe
5	Nicole Paparistodimou	"Niotho Enohes"	Bottom 2
6	Giorgos Douros	"Paranoid"	Eliminated
7	Stergios Daousanakis	"Pride (In the Name of Love)"	Safe
8	Antigoni Psihrami	"Prin To Telos"	Safe
9	Christos Tsakiris	"Rock You Like a Hurricane"	Safe
10	Valanto Trifonos	"Poula Me"	Safe
11	Nicole Paparistodimou	"Alone"	Bottom 2
12	Giorgos Douros	"San Na Min Perase Mia Mera"	Eliminated

=== Top 5 – Summer Hits 2010/Dedications ===
Each contestant had to sing one current summer hit first, then a dedicated song to a loved one second.

Order	Contestant	Song	Result
1	Nicole Paparistodimou	"TiK ToK"	Bottom 2
2	Christos Tsakiris	"Fevgo"	Bottom 3
3	Antigoni Psihrami	"Not Myself Tonight"	Eliminated
4	Valanto Trifonos	"Alejandro"	Safe
5	Stergios Daousanakis	"O Imnos Ton Mavron Skilion"	Safe
6	Antigoni Psihrami	"Listen to Your Heart"	Eliminated
7	Valanto Trifonos	"Forever Young"	Safe
8	Stergios Daousanakis	"Na Me Proseheis"	Safe
9	Christos Tsakiris	"Mera Nihta"	Bottom 3
10	Nicole Paparistodimou	"Hero"	Bottom 2

=== Top 4 – Jury's Choice ===
Each contestant had to sing two songs selected by the jury for them, with the second song performed using a live band. The guest performers for this episode were Giorgos Alkaios & Friends and Sunrise Avenue.

Order	Contestant	Song	Result
1	Valanto Trifonos	"Sta Dosa Ola"	Bottom 3
2	Stergios Daousanakis	"Ti Imoun Gia Sena"	Eliminated
3	Nicole Paparistodimou	"Kosmotheoria"	Safe
4	Nikos Tasiopoulos	"+ Se Thelo"	Bottom 2
5	Nicole Paparistodimou	"Hurt"	Safe
6	Nikos Tasiopoulos	"Every Breath You Take"	Bottom 2
7	Valanto Trifonos	"Sweet Dreams (Are Made of This)"	Bottom 3
8	Stergios Daousanakis	"Enjoy the Silence"	Eliminated

=== Top 3 – 80's, 90's & 00's ===
Each contestant had to sing one song from the 1980s, 1990s, and 2000s. The guest performer for this episode was Elena Paparizou.

Order	Contestant	Song	Result
1	Nikos Tasiopoulos	"San Star Tou Sinema"	Eliminated
2	Nicole Paparistodimou	"Dodeka"	Bottom 2
3	Valanto Trifonos	"Heaven Is a Place on Earth"	Safe
4	Nicole Paparistodimou	"Strong Enough"	Bottom 2
5	Valanto Trifonos	"Nothing Compares 2 U"	Safe
6	Nikos Tasiopoulos	"I Want It That Way"	Eliminated
7	Valanto Trifonos	"Dio Meres Mono"	Safe
8	Nikos Tasiopoulos	"Oneiro Zo"	Eliminated
9	Nicole Paparistodimou	"Crazy in Love"	Bottom 2

=== Top 2 – Finale ===
Order	Contestant	Song	Result
1	Nicole Paparistodimou	"Hurt"	Runner-Up
2	Valanto Trifonos	"Trava Skandali"	Winner
3	Valanto Trifonos	"All by Myself"	Winner
4	Nicole Paparistodimou	"I Have Nothing"	Runner-Up
5	Valanto Trifonos	"Sti Dipla Thesi"	Winner
6	Nicole Paparistodimou	"Sti Dipla Thesi"	Runner-Up

== Elimination chart ==
Legend
Female	Male	Top 15	Top 10	Winner

Safe	Safe First	Safe Last	Eliminated

Stage:		Top 15	Finals								
Week:		4/26	5/3	5/10	5/18	5/24	5/31	6/7	6/14	6/21	6/28
Place	Contestant	Result									
1	Valanto Trifonos	Viewers							Btm 3		Winner
2	Nicole Paparistodimou	Viewers					Btm 2	Btm 2			Runner-Up
3	Nikos Tasiopoulos^{3}	^{3}							Btm 2	Elim	
4	Stergios Daousanakis	Viewers	Btm 4		Btm 2	Btm 2			Elim		
Quit	Christos Tsakiris	Viewers						Quit^{2}			
5	Antigoni Psihrami	Viewers						Elim			
6	Giorgos Douros	Judges		Btm 2		Btm 3	Elim				
7	Diogenis Frantzanas	Viewers	Btm 4		Btm 3	Elim					
8	Gloria Oghomwen	Viewers			Elim						
9	Vasilis Logothetis	Judges	Btm 2	Elim							
10	Tania Karra	Judges	Elim								
11-15	Aristeidis Komninakis	Elim									
11-15	Athina Lianou	Elim									
11-15	Christina Lakoumenta	Elim									
11-15	Dimitris Evripiotis	Elim									
11-15	Ioanna Zervolea	Elim									

- ^{1}Bottom candidates were the last ones to hear their verdict. It was never officially announced if they were amongst contestants with the fewest votes.
- ^{2}Christos Tsakiris decided to quit the show after learning that he would be forced to sing an English song the next week. This came after increased tensions between Tsakiris and the judges after a performance of an English song the week prior, where he sang "Na-na-na" in place of the actual lyrics.
- ^{3}Nikos Tasiopoulos was brought in by Alpha TV to replace Christos Tsakiris after his withdrawal. Tasiopoulos had not previously made it to the top 15.
