= Michael Hennessy (disambiguation) =

Michael or Mike Hennessy or Hennessy may refer to:

- Michael Hennessey (born c. 1948), American attorney and former Sheriff of San Francisco
- Mike Hennessey (1928–2017), English music journalist and jazz pianist
- Michael Hennessy (fl. 1920s–1930s), Irish politician and businessman
- Mike Hennessy (fl. 1990s–2000s), British rower,
- Michael "Mickey" Hennessy (1915—1991), Canadian boxer and politician
