= Nikki Lee =

Nikki Lee may refer to:

- Nikki S. Lee, Korean photographer and filmmaker
- Nikki (singer), Japanese-American musician, named Nikki Lee
- Nicole Paparistodemou, Greek-Cypriot singer, whose stage name is Nikki Lee
