= John S. Fossey =

Researcher

- Died: 15 April 2022
- Education: Queen Mary University of London (PhD 2004) Cardiff University (MChem 2000)
- Scientific career
- Fields: Catalysis; Boronic acids; Molecular sensors; Kinetic resolution; Asymmetric catalysis
- Workplaces: University of Birmingham; Henan Normal University; East China University of Science and Technology
- Doctoral advisor: Christopher Richards
- Website: johnfossey.com

John S. Fossey was a British chemist. He was a professor of synthetic chemistry at the University of Birmingham in the United Kingdom, and a visiting professor at Henan Normal University and guest professor at East China University of Science and Technology, both in China. His research was in molecular recognition and catalysis, and he was a user of boronic acid derivatives. He was an industry fellow of the Royal Society.

== Education ==
Fossey received his four-year MChem from Cardiff University in 2000 and was awarded a PhD from Queen Mary University of London in January 2004.

== Research and career ==
Fossey's research looks at synthetic chemistry to develop new therapies for tuberculosis and diabetes. This work on diabetes involves an alternative drug delivery for type 1 diabetes management. This research is in collaboration with the Chinese Academy of Sciences research institute Guangzhou Institutes of Biomedical Health (GIBH)., to develop new drugs that could help tackle global epidemics. Specifically, Fossey is developing a ‘smart insulin’, a gel that dissolves in the presence of glucose, as an alternative to insulin injection. The idea is that the smart insulin, as a smart drug delivery, can be administered perhaps once a week and will deliver insulin as and only when glucose levels are raised.

He was on the advisory board of two Royal Society of Chemistry journals, Organic Chemistry Frontiers and Catalysis Science & Technology, and the editorial board of the Chemistry Central Journal. He was a co-editor of Boron: Sensing, Synthesis and Supramolecular Self-Assembly.

== Recognition ==
Fossey received a Japan Society for the Promotion of Science postdoctoral fellowship in 2004, and its Bridge Fellowship in 2010; he is chair of the alumni executive committee of the society in the UK and Republic of Ireland. He is also the international student tutor and international representative for the school of chemistry in the University of Birmingham.

He has received funding from the JDRF, CRUK, Leverhulme Trust, the EPSRC, the Royal Society, the Sasakawa Foundation, and the National Natural Science Foundation China. He was a member of a team headed by Tony D. James which received the Daiwa Adrian Prize in 2013 for research into 'chemonostics'. In 2016, he received the Czarnik Emerging Investigator Award for work on catalysis and sensing.

He was awarded the CRUK Pioneer Award in 2018 to support his research in establishing early detection potential from single molecule chemosensors. He is the principal investigator of a JDRF project focused on translating boronic acid-mediated recognition to smart drug delivery for diabetes.

== Personal life ==
Fossey met his wife Rumi while working in Japan. They had three children together, Karen, Toby and Edwin.

Fossey died on Friday 15 April 2022 at the age of 44.
