= Queen Mary University of London Boat Club =

British rowing club

- Location: Chiswick, London, England
- Coordinates: 51.50627°N 0.055676°E
- Home water: The Tideway
- Founded: 1910
- Affiliations: British Rowing, University of London Boat Club
- Website: www.qmulbc.co.uk

Events
- Merger Cup

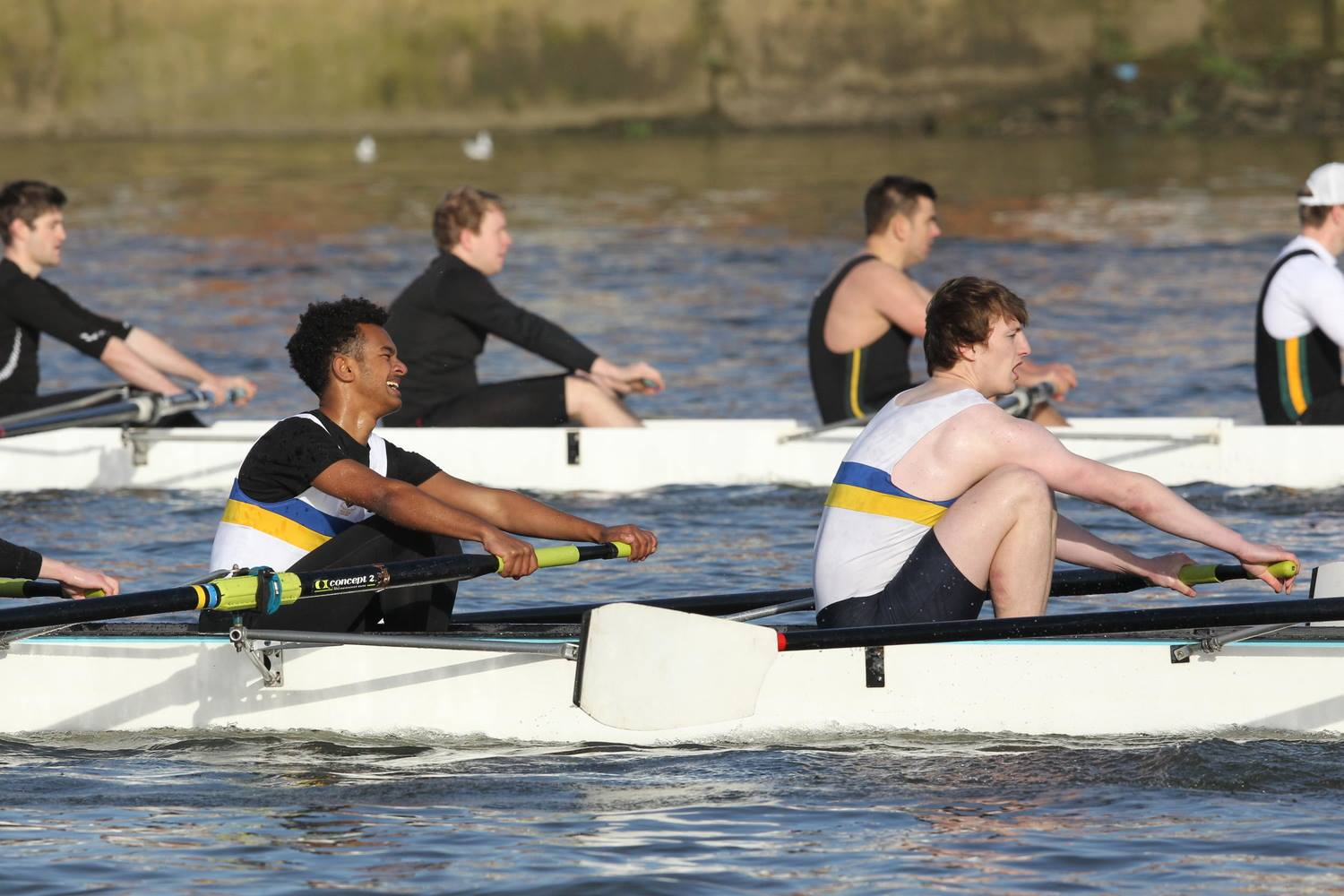
Source: rowingphotography.photoshelter.com

Queen Mary University of London Boat Club (QMULBC) is the rowing club of Queen Mary University of London.

Barts and The London School of Medicine and Dentistry, although a faculty of Queen Mary, have their own boat club: St Bartholomew's and the London Hospitals' Boat Club. The two sides contest the Merger Cup annually. The club is affiliated to both BUCS and British Rowing.

== History ==
The club was founded in 1910. Unlike most University of London colleges, the club rowed from the London Regatta Centre, in the Docklands up until 2015.

In 2015, the club decided to move to the University of London Boathouse on the Tideway.

In 2025, the club relocated back to the London Docklands

== Members ==
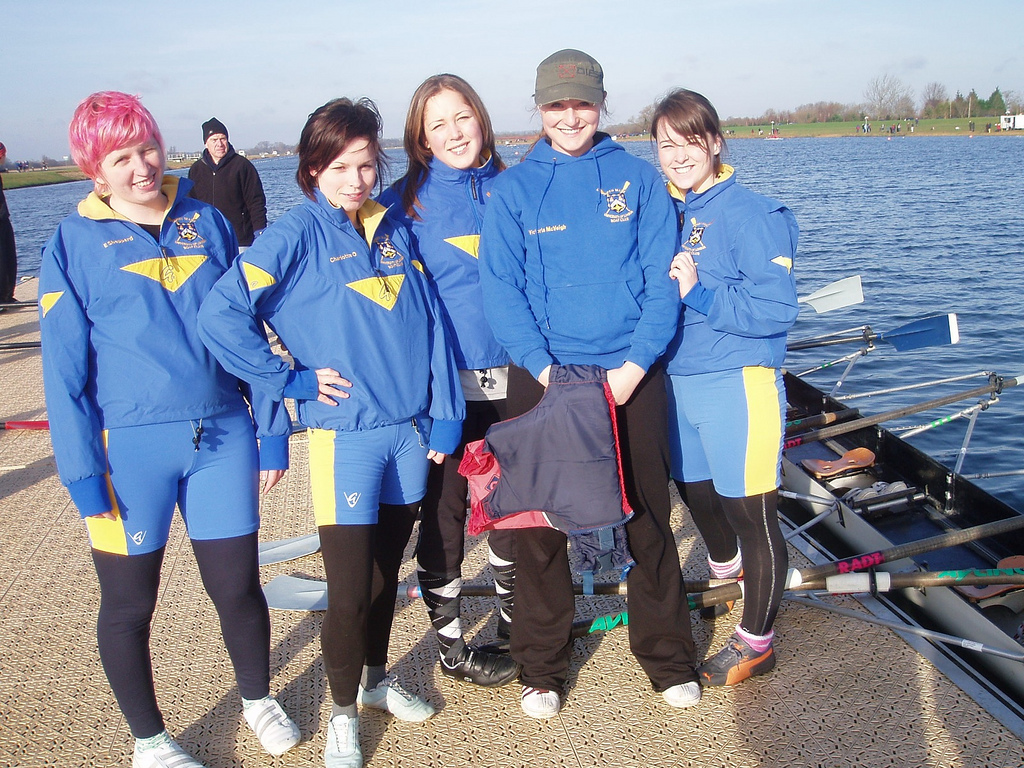
A crew wearing the club colours

The Queen Mary Boat Club accepts experienced and novice rowers to improve their fitness and technique. They represent Queen Mary at rowing events, offering opportunities for rowers to compete locally and nationally. Student crews race in eights, fours/quads, doubles/pairs and singles. Alumni of the university are eligible to row with Drapers Rowing Club. Annually, the students compete against a Drapers invitational crew in the Drapers Challenge Cup.

QMULBC compete at national events including Head of the River Fours, Head of the River Race, Women's Eights Head of the River Race, Metropolitan Regatta, Henley Women's Regatta and Henley Royal Regatta. The club also compete regularly at British University and College Sport (BUCS) events.

Previous college rowers include Olympians Richard Budgett, Martin Cross, and Mike Hennessy and Paralympian Martyna Snopek.

== Kit ==
The club's kit is in the university's colours of spectrum blue and maize. The racing kit consists of blue lycra with gold stripes running down each side. To mark the club's centenary year the kit was briefly changed to a gold upper, with blue lower part. The club blades are spectrum blue, with two maize stripes.

== Notable members ==
- Richard Budgett
- Martin Cross
- Mike Hennessy
- Martyna Snopek

== See also ==
- Rowing on the River Thames
- University of London Boat Club
- University rowing (UK)
