= Onirama =

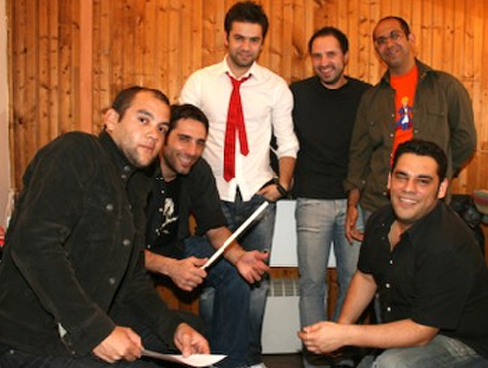
- Onirama backstage at Theatro Dasous in 2007

Background information
- Also known as: Mixing Up The Medicine
- Origin: Greece, Thessaloniki
- Genres: Pop rock, rock
- Years active: 2000 - 2026
- Label: Lyra Records
- Members: Thodoris Marantinis; Giorgos Kokonidis; Dimitris Kokonidis; Alexis Papakonstantinou; Christos Tresintsis
- Website: www.onirama.gr

Onirama was a Greek pop rock band that has had a number of hits in Greece. They are known for their wide range of music, and party-like concerts.

== Career ==
=== 2000-2005: Beginnings & First successes ===
Onirama was founded in October 2000 from the idea of Thodoris Marantinis and Dionisis Prantzis after they met during their military services. Giorgos and Dimitris Kokonidis were also founding members, and a couple of months later Kostas Karakatsanis joined. The band originally started off as a hobby, with the name "Mixing Up The Medicine" inspired by lyrics from a Bob Dylan song. The name was a reflection of the wide range of music they played.

Their first live performance was at club Mesogios in Thessaloniki. Their concert and party-like live performances, quickly distinguished them among fans and people around Thessaloniki, causing the band to take themselves more seriously.

In 2003 Christos Tresintsis joined Onirama and they began a series of appearances at clubs around Thessaloniki including Mylos, Shark, Rodon Club in Athens and several festivals. In mid-2003, the band renamed themselves Onirama as their band became more of a reality. The name comes from a Greek phrase "Onira Mas" meaning "Our Dreams".

In October 2004, Onirama began appearing at Malt & Jazz with their signature live performances causing talk around Thessaloniki. Around the same time, the band began writing their first album and searching for a record label.

=== 2005-2008: First studio album ===
In 2005 they signed with Lyra Records and released their debut album Diskolos Kairos Gia Prinkipes (A tough time for princes) on 7 December 2005. The lead single "O Horos (Klise Ta Matia)" (The Dance, Close your eyes) became a radio hit and gained Onirama popularity, while the second single "Mia Mera Tha 'Rtheis" (One day you will come) also became a radio hit.

In the Summer of 2006, they made appearances all over Chalkidiki, while they appeared in Athens all winter long with Antonis Remos. In January 2006, Onirama decided to change things up, and participated in an interactive musical performance directed by Rigos Kostantinos at Theatro Dasous in Thessaloniki. In the performance, the members of the band each unfold another aspect of their characters, while interacting with the audience.

In March 2006, Onirama was nominated for "Best pop band" at the 5th Arion Music Awards, while they also appeared with Ble, Adrianna Babali, Vasilis Papakonstandinou, and Michalis Hatzigiannis.

On February 21, 2007, Onirama collaborated with Antonis Remos for the 4th MAD Secret Concert. At the concert, they sang many English hits, and fans nicknamed the collaboration "OniRemos". In summer 2007, Onirama and Antonis Remos toured Greece together.

=== 2008-Present: Klepsidra, Horis Etia and Sti Hora Ton Trelon ===
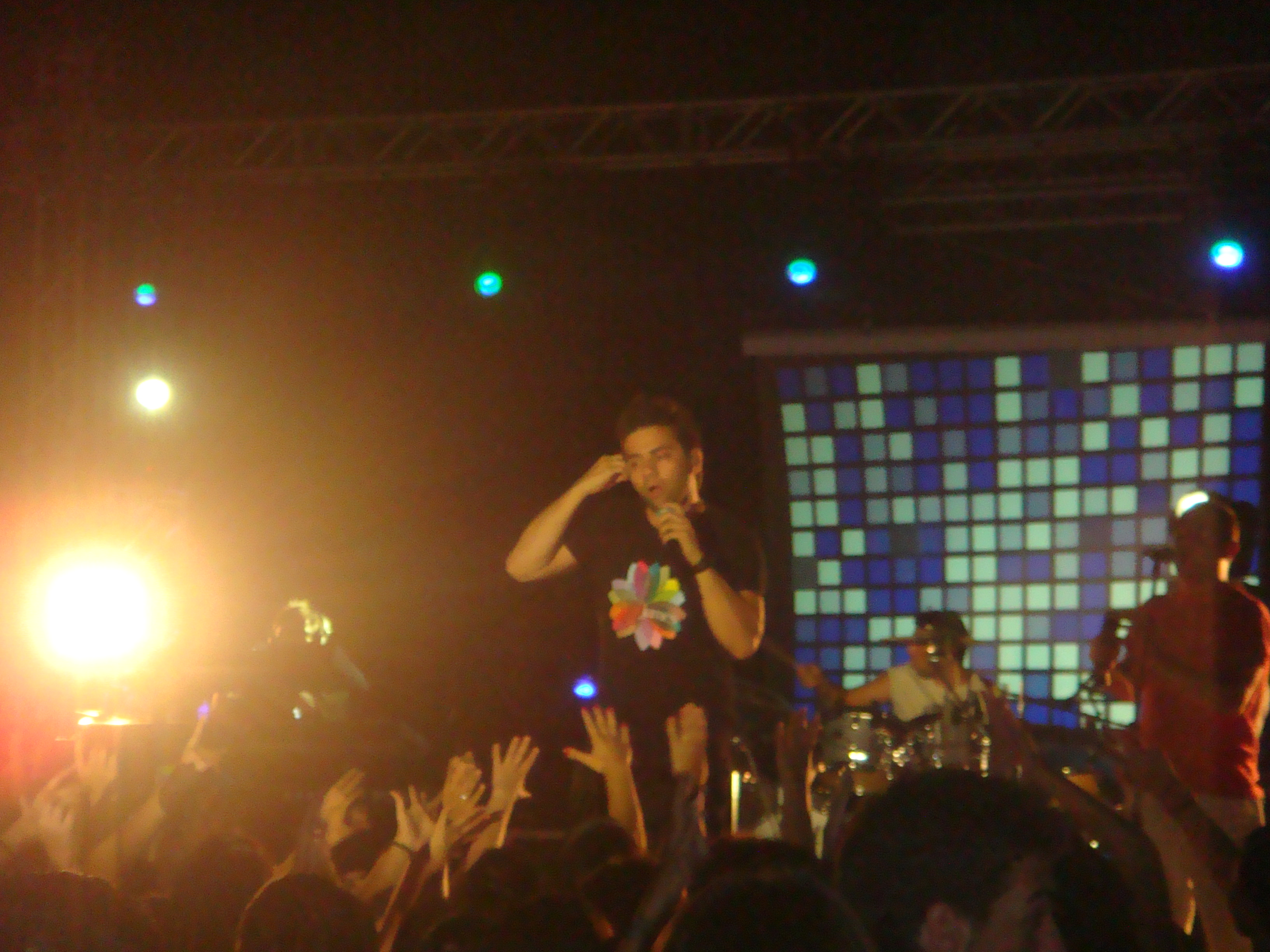
Onirama while performing at Agia Triada, Vrontou, Pieria.

For the winter season 2007-2008, Onirama successfully appeared alone at popular Club Cinema Live at Peiraios 130 in Athens with their signature live performances. In March 2008, they entered the studio to record their second studio album.

In June 2008, Onirama released their second album Klepsidra (Hourglass) which reached number 1 on the IFPI charts and later was certified gold. The album also placed at number eleven on IFPI's Year-end chart for Top 50 Greek albums of 2008, and number thirteen on the Top 50 Greek and International albums of 2008. The lead single "I Balanta Tou Trellou" (The crazy guy's ballad) instantly became a radio hit. The album also featured their first English song to appear on an album, titled "Maybe Tonight". The title track "Klepsidra" was released as the second single, and reached the number 1 spot in airplay. "Oti Den Exeis" (Whatever you don't have) was released as the third single, and as of November 2009, is in the top 5 of the airplay charts. In June 2008, they appeared at the MAD Video Music Awards. Around the same time, they were also voted the "Next big name" in Greece by MAD TV voters.

Throughout summer 2008, Onirama toured all of Greece, while in the winter, they appeared with Despina Vandi. Also, a major defining point in the group's career was on August 1, where the group performed as the opening act in front of thousands of people for international superstar Lenny Kravitz on his Love Revolution Tour, which was a concert in Athens.

On November 26, 2009 Onirama released a compilation album titled Horis Etia (Without reason). The two-disc album features collaborations with other singers covering songs from the band's first two albums, new versions of past songs, remixes, as well as some new songs. For the winter season, Onirama appeared in a concert series with Michalis Hatzigiannis at club REX in Athens.

In early November, Onirama released a new studio album titled Sti Hora Ton Trelon. The album contains 12 songs, with two of them being in English.

== Current members ==
- Thodoris Marantinis - lead vocals, guitar
- Giorgos Kokonidis - lead guitar, backing vocals
- Dimitris Kokonidis - drums, percussion
- Alexis Papakonstantinou - bass guitar, backing vocals
- Christos Tresintsis - keyboards, backing vocals

== Past members ==
- Kostas Karakatsanis - violin, harmonica, backing vocals
- Dionisis Frantzis - bass guitar, backing vocals

== Discography ==
=== Studio albums ===
All the albums listed underneath were released and charted in Greece and Cyprus.

Year	Title	Certification
2007	Dyskolos Kairos Gia Pringipes	—
2008	Clepsydra	Gold
2009	Horis Aitia	
2010	Sti Hora Ton Trelon	—
2014	Methismeno Tatouaz	
2017	Pop Art	
2021	Anthologio Gia Mikrous Ke Megalous	
