= Lola (TV series) =

- Λόλα
- Created by: Sebastián Ortega
- Developed by: Anna Hatzisofia
- Directed by: Stefanos Kontomaris; Kostas Kostopoulos
- Starring: Anta Livitsanou; Thanassis Efthimiadis
- Narrated by: Irini Balta
- Theme music composer: Jennifer Ayache (music & lyrics)
- Opening theme: "Lola" by Superbus
- Countries of origin: Greece; Cyprus
- Original language: Greek
- No. of episodes: 202

Production
- Production locations: Athens, Greece
- Running time: 45 minutes

Original release
- Network: ANT1
- Release: September 22, 2008 – July 7, 2009

Related
- Lalola

Lola (Greek: Λόλα, stylized as ΛΟΛΑ) was the Greek remake of the successful Argentine comedy franchise Lalola. The series premiered on September 22, 2008 in Greece on ANT1 and ran Monday through Friday. The last episode was released on July 7, 2009.

== Plot ==
The TV series centers on the transformation of a man into a woman, sharing with the audience the comical daily events of her new life.

The story begins with Leonidas Lalos who is editor and director of "Mister", a typical men's lifestyle magazine. Young, successful and accomplished, he is an eligible bachelor who has the same attitude towards women as he portrays them in his magazine: expendable pleasure items. His philosophy on life can be summed up as follows: fast cars, fast internet, fast women! In his path he leaves many brokenhearted victims the last of which, the beautiful and mysterious Romina decides to teach him a lesson. With the help of a gypsy she casts a spell on him. On a night with a moon eclipse, the transformation takes places and Lalos wakes up the next day as a beautiful woman.

Feeling lost and trapped in a body filled with unknown hormones, Lola asks Hara, her best friend for help. Hara was secretly in love with Lalos for years. They look for Romina but can't find her. Lola is thus forced to adjust to her new identity and to address the world as a woman with Hara's help. So as to retain her authority in the magazine, Lola appears as Lalo's first cousin to replace him for as long as he is abroad.

Lola is faced with the hard reality of being a woman in the 21st century. Although women have accomplished a lot, the structures of society still remain phallocratic. She thus learns first hand all about sexual harassment and sexist work behaviour. At the same time she discovers the insanity experienced by a modern woman who has to be the professional, sexy, responsible, fashionable, and as well as a homemaker.

On the one hand Lola wants to get rid of her new self, on the other hand she feels ever more like a woman. However, in all this mess Lola has an advantage: she knows first hand male psychology coupled with female intuition. Things get more complicated when she falls in love with her colleague Fotis, who falls in love with her at first sight. Thus Lola discovers the emotional tantrums of the female nature.

The series mostly follow the structure of Lalola, but the plot is extended with longer scenes at locations. For example, the plot timeline of 12 episodes of Lalola are equal to 17 episodes of Lola.

== Cast ==
- Anta Livitsanou as Theodora "Lola" Lalou/Eva Ambatzoglou
- Thanasis Efthimiadis as Fotis Stergiou
- Tasos Chalkias as Argiris Paraskevopoulos (Lola's Boss)
- Anna Andrianou as Elvira Hatzifotiadi (Argiris's wife)
- Anna Rezan as Nadia
- Christos Vasilopoulos as Grigoris Exarhos
- Irini Balta as Hara Tsalikoglou (Lola's/Lalo's best friend)
- Thanos Kalioras as Teo Papas
- Sylvia Delikoura as Natalia Paraskevopoulou-Hatzifotiadi (Teo's daughter)
- Stavros Nikolaidis as Panos Nikolaou
- Valeria Kouroupi as Victoria "Vicky" Douka
- Vivian Kontomari as Ifigenia
- Ioanna Asimakopoulou as Julia
- Stelios Petrakis as Nikos
- Odisseas Stamoulis as Yiorgos (Hara's ex-boyfriend)
- Eleni Papadogia as Melina Stergiou (Foti's daughter)
- Stefanos Tsakirakis as Stefanos (Hara's friend)
- Rania Ioannidou as Eirini (Melina's grandmother)

=== Special appearances ===
- Giannis Aivazis as Leonidas Lalos/Adam Ambatzoglou
- Tonia Sotiropoulou as Romina
- Konstantina Savidi as the gypsi-witch
- Aspasia Tzitzikaki as Susanna Lalou (Lola's/Lalo's mom)
- Giorgos Lefas as Rihardos Lalos (Lola's/Lalo's dad)
- Manos Pintzis as Periklis (Susanna's lover)
- Pavlos Kontogiannidis as Jim Aniston
- Maria Georgiadou as Sonia
- Lena Fragouli as Toula
- Daisy Sebekopoulou as Monika
- Giannis Spaliaras as Alexandros Filippou
- Giannis Dritsas as Alex (Natalia's friend)
- Hara Zaronaki as Danai (Natalia's best friend)
- Spyros Mpimpilas as Dr. Koulios
- Fani Spana as Masa
- Alexandros Parthenis as Vassilis (Billy) Giakoumopoulos (Hara's ex-boyfriend)
- Magda Pensou as Maria Giannidou (Foti's ex-wife)
- Giorgos Partsalakis as Kosmas Papaliakos
- Isabella Vlasiadou as Jenny Ambatzoglou
- Giorgos Dampasis as Sergios
- Stella Giampoura as Evelina Ambatzoglou
- Maro Mauri as Jennifer Aniston

== See also ==
- IMDB page
