= Angela Speck =

Professor of Astrophysics

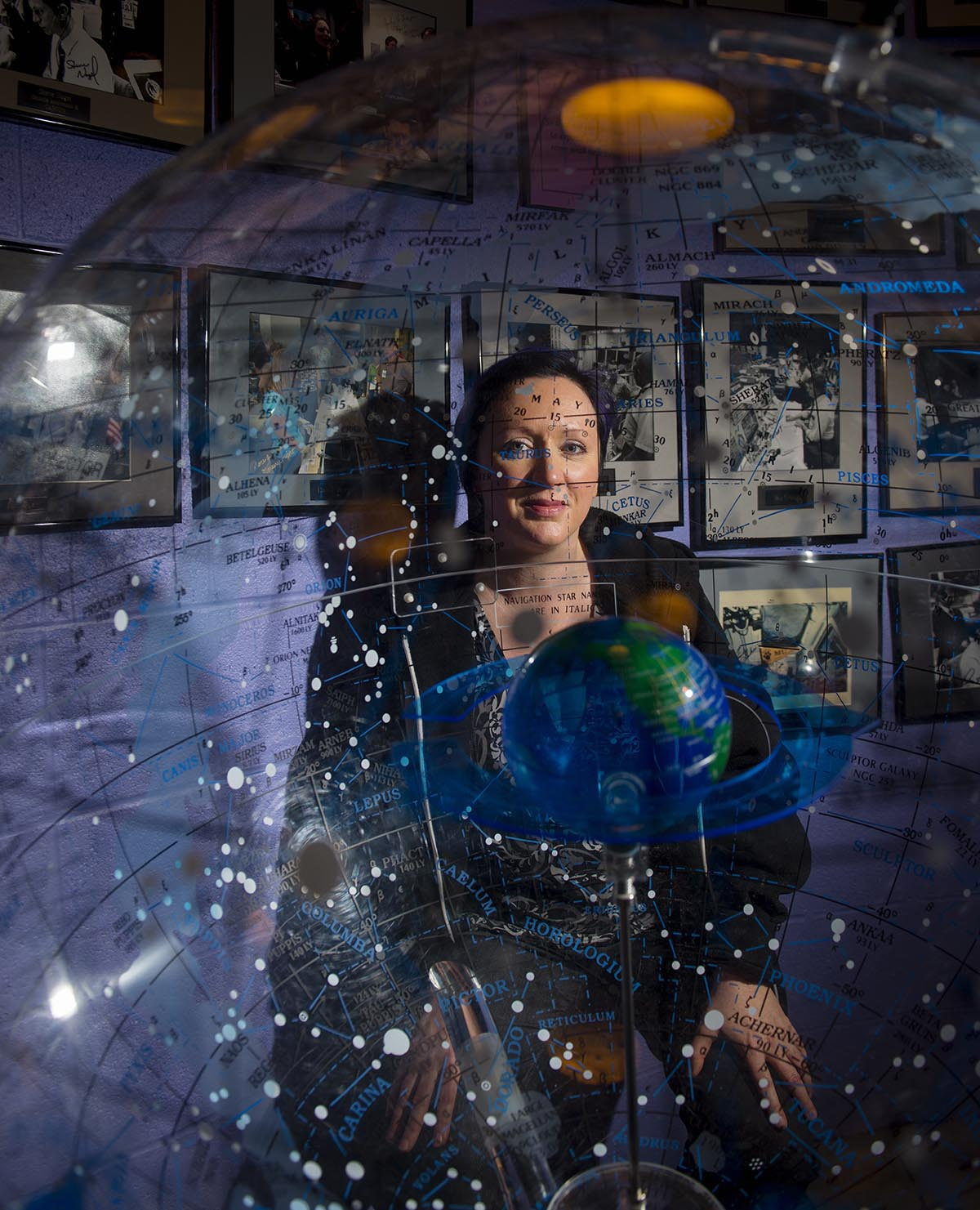
- Angela Speck in 2014
- Born: Angela Karen Speck
- Education: Queen Mary University of London; University College London
- Scientific career
- Fields: Astronomy; Astrophysics; Infrared; Mineralogy; Optical properties
- Workplaces: University of Missouri; University of Illinois at Urbana-Champaign; University College London
- Thesis: The Mineralogy of Dust Around Evolved Stars (1998)
- Website: www.utsa.edu/physics/faculty/AngelaSpeck.html

Angela Karen Speck is a Professor of Astrophysics and the Chair of the Department of Physics & Astronomy at the University of Texas at San Antonio. She works on infrared astronomy and the study of space dust. She is a popular science communicator, and was co-chair of the National Total Solar Eclipse Task Force.

== Early life and education ==
Speck was born in Bradford, Yorkshire, where she was inspired to study physics by the Apollo space program and by watching Star Trek. She studied astrophysics at Queen Mary University of London. After completing her undergraduate degree, Speck worked as a research and development technician in Lancashire. She was a graduate student at University College London, earning a PhD in astronomy in 1998 for research on the dust and molecules around evolved stars.

== Career and research ==
After her PhD, Speck remained at University College London as a postdoctoral fellow. In 1999 she moved to the University of Illinois at Urbana–Champaign, where she worked in the astronomy department. She moved to the University of Missouri in 2002, where she started to build the astronomy program. She developed courses in cosmochemistry for students from all departments. In her early years at the University of Missouri, Speck organised a public outreach program called Cosmic Conversations.

Speck joined the University of Missouri as a visiting assistant professor in fall 2002. She became a "regular" assistant professor in 2004 and an adjunct professor of geology in 2007. She got tenure and promotion to associate professor in 2008 and was made director and professor of astronomy in 2009. Speck only intended on the United States temporarily, but found that it was a good fit with her research. Her research focuses on the study of infrared light especially as it relates to circumstellar dust. Star dust is essential to the formation of planets and is involved in interstellar processes including molecular formation and gas heating. Mass-loss from stars is driven by radiation pressure on dust grains. She uses spectroscopy, imaging and modelling to study the chemical compositions of stars. Speck mainly considers how dust formation changes during the evolution of low and intermediate mass stars. She used the Spitzer Space Telescope to study space dust in the spiral galaxy Messier 74. She found that space dust formation is effective in supernovae, using up 5% of their heavy elements. She went on to study unidentified infrared emission.

As Speck was in Missouri, which was part of totality for the 2017 solar eclipse, and spent 3 years promoting the celestial event across North America. Speck was described by PBS as the "scientist in the forefront of educating the public" about the solar eclipse, and was appointed co-chair of the National Total Solar Eclipse Task Force. She worked with the NASA Heliophysics Science Division to share information about the eclipse. Speck created a guide to watching the eclipse with Science Friday.

=== Academic service and advocacy ===
Speck is responsible for mentoring University of Missouri students who are interested in studying astronomy. She directs their Center for the Integration of Research, Teaching and Learning, which supports students in their preparation for careers. In 2008 she was awarded a University of Missouri award for research, in 2013 the University of Missouri William T. Kemper Fellowship for Teaching Excellence. Speck was named after Angela Davis, and has always been interested in inclusion and equity. She was appointed to the University of Missouri Policy Committee on Diversity Enhancement. She serves as a member of the American Astronomical Society Council. She has presented at The Story Collider. She has also served as Chair the User Committee of the National Optical Astronomy Observatory and the Kitt Peak National Observatory.

== Recognition ==
Speck won the University of Missouri Service Award for her Diversity work in 2016. She was named to the 2021 class of Fellows of the American Association for the Advancement of Science.
