= Martyna Snopek =

Polish Paralympic rower

Martyna Snopek (born 22 April 1986 in Puławy) is a Polish disabled rower, paralympian, and twice World Rowing Championship bronze medalist (2006, 2007).

Snopek studied her degree in London, rowing for the Queen Mary, University of London Boat Club.

She represented Poland at the Summer Paralympics in Beijing in 2008 in singles competitions. In her race, she took the third place qualifier, which earned her promotion to repechage, in which she achieved third place, missing out on promotion to the final heat A. In the final heat B she classified in 12th place.
