= Dyskolos Kairos Gia Pringipes =

Dyskolos Keros Ya Pringipes

Studio album by Onirama
- Released: December 7, 2005
- Recorded: 2005
- Genre: Pop rock, rock
- Language: Greek
- Label: Lyra

Onirama chronology
Dyskolos Keros Ya Pringipes (2005)	Clepsydra (2008)

Dyskolos Keros Ya Pringipes (Greek: Δύσκολος Καιρός Για Πρίγκιπες; English: A tough time for princes) is the name of the debut album of the Greek musical group Onirama. The album was released on December 7, 2005 by Lyra Records.

== Track listing ==
1. "Intro" – 0:59
2. "Dyskolos Keros Ya Prinkipes" (A tough time for princes) – 3:40
3. "O Horos (Klise Ta Matia)" (The dance [Close your eyes]) – 3:49
4. "Mia Zoe Tosi Micri" (A life so small) – 3:27
5. "Mia Mera Tha 'Rthis" (One day you'll come) – 3:56
6. "Yi Ke Ouranos" (Earth and sky) – 4:16
7. "O Paradisos Ine Makria" (Paradise is far away) – 3:21
8. "Stigmes" (Moments) – 2:54
9. "Lefka Domatia" (White rooms) – 2:48
10. "Oniropayida" (Dreamcatcher) – 3:49
11. "Metra Tis Meres" (Count the days) – 2:54
12. "O Horos" (Club Mix) (The Dance [Club Mix]) – 4:06
13. "O Horos" (Unplugged) (The Dance [Unplugged]) – 2:55
14. "Outro"

== Singles ==
"O Horos (Klise Ta Matia)"

"O Horos (Klise Ta Matia)" was the first single from the album, and became a radio hit.

"Mia Mera Tha 'Rtheis"

"Mia Mera Tha 'Rtheis" was the second single from the album, and also became a radio hit.

== Personnel ==
- Thodoris Marantinis – vocals, acoustic guitar
- Yorgos Kokonidis – electric guitar
- Dimitris Kokonidis – drums
- Dionysis Frantzis – bass
- Kostas Karakatsanis – violin, harmonica
- Christos Tresintsis – piano, vocals
