= Henan Normal University =

University in Xinxiang, Henan, China

- 河南师范大学
- Motto: 厚德博学 止于至善
- Type: Public university
- Established: 1923
- President: Wang Zongmin (王宗敏)
- Faculty: 2,800
- Students: 70,000
- Location: Xinxiang, Henan, People's Republic of China; 35.3255°N 113.9072°E
- Nickname: 河师大
- Website: www.htu.cn

Henan Normal University (simplified Chinese: 河南师范大学; traditional Chinese: 河南師範大學; pinyin: Hénán Shīfàn Dàxué), colloquially known as 河师大 (pinyin: Héshīdà), is a public normal university located in the northern part of Xinxiang, Henan, China. In 2022, Henan Normal University ranked 3rd in Henan province and top 150 in China. Henan Normal University owns one of the largest education institutions in China. In addition to the university, it contains attached kindergartens, one primary school and one National Key Middle-High School.

== History ==
Henan Normal University is one of the key universities directly under the provincial government, developed from the School of Science of Henan University (founded in 1923) and Pingyuan Teachers college (founded in 1951). Due to the adjustment of colleges and departments, the university was formerly named as Henan Teachers Normal College 2, Henan Second Teachers College and Xinxiang Teachers College after the founding of People's Republic of China. And in 1985 it was changed to the current name.

In August 1948, Pingyuan Province was set up. To meet the needs of construction, the government decided to establish a new university, presently named Pingyuan University. In March, 1951, the university was named Pingyuan Teachers College, being approved by Central Ministry of Education. Pingyuan Teachers College held a grand school-opening ceremony on November 23, 1951. The college had 4 departments with 7 specialities, 485 students, 181 faculty and staff, 83 teachers of whom are more than 10 professors.

In August 1953, Pingyuan Teachers College and Henan University in Kaifeng merged into Henan Teachers Normal College with the two colleges being run separately. College 1 which was merged liberal arts of former Henan University and Pingyuan Teachers College run in Kaifeng. College 2 which merged science departments of former Hennan University and Pingyuan Teachers Normal College run in Xinxiang. College 2 had 4 departments including mathematics, physics, chemistry, biology. It became the pure science normal college after being regulated. College 2 was renamed Hennan Second Teachers College and Xinxiang Teachers College according to department-speciality adjusting spirit of the colleges and universities of State Council afterwards.

From 1956 to 1965, the university developed rapidly and enrolled totally 6,708 students, of whom 6,007 graduated. It fostered a great number of qualified talents and supported the national economic construction. But in the ten-year Cultural Revolution (1966–1976), the university was seriously destroyed. After “Gang of Four” was crushed in 1976, especially after the Third Plenary Session of the Eleventh Central Committee of CPC, the university began to walk onto a development road through bringing out of chaos and carrying out a series of development and reform work.

From 1975, the university recovered liberal arts and entered the building and developing commonly period of liberal arts and science department, but the science department was taken as the dominant factor in the sides of department offered. To fit in with Henan’s economic and educational situations and meet the needs of talents, Xinxiang Teachers College was renamed Henan Normal University in June 1985. So far it has become a comprehensive normal university with bigger scale, varied form and complete subjects and courses.

In 2023, the university's office of the president merged into the university's Chinese Communist Party committee, which would directly administer the university henceforth.

== Campus ==
Main Campus (新乡主校区): Located in Henan Province Xinxiang City Jianshe Road east section 46. It is the core campus of Henan Normal University, with complete facilities, rich resources, and perfect teaching and scientific research. Compared with other campuses, the main campus is relatively large and the campus environment is relatively prosperous.

Xin Lian Campus (新联学院): Located in Zhengzhou, Henan Province. On February 2, 2021, the school became a bachelor's university. It was renamed Zhongyuan Science and Technology campus. But it still belongs to Henan Normal University.

== Rankings and reputation ==
Henan Normal University It ranks 73rd among the universities in mainland China, 4th among the local teacher training universities in China, and 3rd among the universities in Henan Province.

In the "Nature Index 2020 Annual Tables", three disciplines of Henan Normal University (HNU), namely Chemistry, Earth and Environmental Sciences and Physics, have been ranked among the top 100 disciplines in their respective fields in the Nature Index of Chinese Universities. Among them, Chemistry ranked 43rd among Chinese universities and 2nd among universities in Henan Province; Earth and Environmental Sciences ranked 69th among domestic universities and 1st among universities in Henan Province; Physics ranked 74th among Chinese universities and 3rd among universities in Henan Province.

In 2021, Henan Normal University continued to be strong in the field of disciplines, and three disciplines of chemistry, earth and environmental sciences, and physics continued to enter the list of top 100 disciplines of Chinese universities in this field of nature index. Among them, Chemistry ranked 68th among Chinese universities, 4th among local teacher training universities in China, and 3rd among universities in Henan Province; Earth and Environmental Sciences ranked 79th among Chinese universities, 4th among local teacher training universities in China, and 1st among universities in Henan Province; Physics ranked 80th among Chinese universities, 4th among local teacher training universities in China, and 3rd among universities in Henan Province.
