= Clive Leo McNeir =

British linguist, lexicographer and writer

Clive Leo McNeir is a British linguist, lexicographer, and author of a series of crime novels. As a director of The European Language Initiative, he compiled and edited 12 dictionaries in 15 languages, the first one being published by Cassell in 1993.

== Education ==
McNeir received a bachelor's degree in French and German from the Queen Mary University of London, where he studied from 1963 to 1967.

== Personal life ==
He and his wife, cookery writer Cassandra, live in a 300-year-old cottage in rural Northamptonshire.

== Bibliography ==
=== Dictionaries and reference works ===
- Cassell Multilingual Dictionary of Local Government and Business: The European Language Initiative
- Geiriadur Terminoleg Trefniadaeth: Dictionary of Procedural Terms (1999)
- Thesaurus of the Gaelic Language (2011)

=== Crime novels ===
Marnie Walker Series

- Getaway with murder (2000)
- Death in Little Venice (2001)
- Kiss and Tell (2003)
- Devil in the Detail (2004)
- No Secrets (2006)
- Sally Ann's Summer (2007)
- Smoke and Mirrors (2009)
- Gifthorse (2011)
- Stick in the Mud (2012)
- Smoke Without Fire (2015)
- Witching hour (2017)
- To Have and to Hold (2019)
- Beyond the Grave (2021)
- Ivory Tower (2023)
