= Simon C. Page =

British graphic designer based in London

- Born: United Kingdom
- Known for: Graphic design
- Notable work: International Year of Astronomy posters International Year of Chemistry posters
- Website: simoncpage.co.uk

Simon C. Page is a British graphic designer based in London. He is most known for creating geometric graphic designs. He created promotional posters for the International Year of Astronomy and for the International Year of Chemistry.

In 2009, he won the Intel Digital Artist: Stars of Tomorrow award.

== Early life and education ==
Page was born and raised in the United Kingdom. According to Page, he was interested in graphic design since he was a child. However, after school he felt that he was more interested in Applied Mathematics and pursued a degree in that discipline. He holds a degree in Applied Mathematics from Queen Mary University of London.

== Career ==
After completing his education, Page joined a property company in a finance position and later got involved in programming and database development. There, he had to create corporate presentations that got him involved in graphic design. In 2007, he participated in a poster design competition that he won.

Towards the end of 2009, Page learned that 2009 was the International Year of Astronomy and designed several posters as a personal project. When the International Year of Astronomy organization saw the posters, they contacted page to seek permission to use them. He granted the permission and the posters were used in promotional events.

In 2011, he designed 10 posters for the International Year of Chemistry. These posters were later used by the International Year of Chemistry in an official capacity. Each of the posters was inspired by a prominent person in the field of chemistry. He designed a poster inspired by Marie Curie's work, which was used to promote a screening of a film about her life. The International Year of Chemistry also offered the poster prints on their website.

As of 2009, Page creates logos, designs and editorial illustrations for organisations and sells prints on his website. He has also worked on designing T-shirts. In May 2012 Simon created his first furniture designs with the launch of his Cuben Space Io Armchair and new wallpaper that was displayed at the International Contemporary Furniture Fare in 2012.

== In the media ==
Page's International Year of Astronomy posters were featured in The New York Times Style Magazine that wrote "The result is a beautiful exercise in conceptual minimalism, with a clear geometric bent that betrays Page’s math-nerd origins" and Wired wrote about the posters, "with today’s artists’ renderings of space becoming increasingly detailed, realistic and flashy, these posters truly stand out."

The New York Times Style Magazine also featured the posters page created for International Year of Chemistry and wrote, "in an excessively cluttered aesthetic environment, Page practices the elegantly reductive, Swiss and Bauhaus-influenced design that he believes appeals to the scientific and non-scientific communities."
