= Nicole Paparistodemou =

Nikki Lee
- Also known as: Nikki Lee
- Born: Nicole Paparistodemou; 16 December 1991 (age 34); Sydney, Australia
- Origin: Sydney, Australia
- Genres: pop, dance
- Occupation: Singer
- Instruments: Vocals, piano
- Years active: 2010 – Present
- Label: Down2Earth
- Website: Official Page

Nicole Paparistodemou (Greek: Νικόλ Παπαριστοδήμου; born 16 December 1991), also known as Nikki Lee, is a Greek-Cypriot singer, born in Sydney, Australia and raised between Sydney and Paphos, Cyprus, whose star began to shine after her appearance in Greek Idol. Nicole had also participated in the Cyprus Final for the Eurovision Song Contest 2010 with the song "Like a Woman".

== 1991–2010: Early life ==
Nicole was born on 16 December 1991 in Sydney, Australia to Yiannis and Helen Paparistodemou and spent her childhood between Sydney and Paphos, Cyprus. She has an older and a younger brother, Marinos and Raphaellos -correspondingly. Having expressed a genuine interest towards music from a very young age she began taking piano, theory, solfège and harmony classes at the age of 6 as well as vocal-coach lessons at the age of 8. During her teenage years, she participated in numerous local singing competitions as well as in the Junior Eurovision Song Contest twice and, although aspiring to become a lawyer, her love for music led her to apply for a scholarship to Berklee College of Music in Boston which she had managed to obtain. Nonetheless, her participation in Greek Idol I had changed her plans and she saved her place for a later stage.

=== Cyprus National Final for Eurovision ===
Nicole's attempt for winning the Cyprus Final in the Eurovision Song Contest may have not been successful but her song, "Like a Woman", a powerful ballad written by the infamous Eurovision composer Mike Connaris, had won the hearts of the audiences who were introduced to her just before the beginning of the Greek Idol.

== 2010: Greek Idol ==
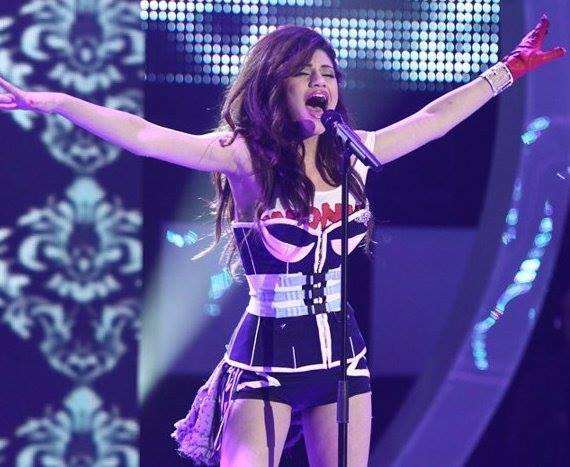

As she had missed the opportunity to represent Cyprus in the Eurovision Song Contest in 2010, Nicole decided to give Greek Idol a go. The following day after the Cyprus National Final, she went for the Greek Idol audition and the judges had been left amazed with her vocal abilities. Having been chosen in the final 10 of the show, week by week her performances were applauded by the judges and the public. However it was not only her voice that won their hearts but also her petite-frame and childish naiveness. No Greek Idol fan can forget her nickname "Fraoulitsa/Φραουλίτσα" (little strawberry), given to her by one of the judges, Petros Kostopoulos. Greek Idol I ended with Nicole winning 2nd place.

== 2011: Post-Greek Idol era ==
Straight after the end of Greek Idol I in June 2010, Nicole began her journey in the music pathways in Greece. In July 2010 she accompanied Anna Vissi in her Cyprus tour, after Anna had given her and Valando Tryfonos this opportunity, during the Greek Idol final. In August 2010, Nicole had appeared next to Giannis Ploutarchos/Melisses/Valando Tryfonos and Stergios Ntaousanakis in Thessaloniki for two months and consequently, from October 2010 up until the beginning of March 2011, she had been singing next to Despoina Vandi at Vox in Athens. In addition, she was asked to perform among other talented musicians on the Michael Jackson "Dangerous" tribute held in December 2010 in Athens.

In the end of May 2011, she was signed to the Greek Music Label Lyra and her first single "Mono i agapi" (Only love) was released.

== 2012–Present: Nikki Lee ==
In the beginning of 2012, Nicole was signed to Down2Earth Records and since then, she switched her stage name to "Nikki Lee" while adopting a different image, influenced by the Japanese fashion. Her song "Chiki Chiki" was released in June 2012 and was a huge success in many different countries. Her biggest moment of success though in 2012 was her collaboration with Claydee on the hit "Mamacita Buena" which became one of the most viewed Greek songs on YouTube. In May 2013, almost a year after "Chiki Chiki", her second single "Heleya" was released with promising success.

In 2014 she moved to Sydney, in order to pursue her studies at the JMC Music Academy in Music (Contemporary Performance). In 2016 she collaborated with Sergio Selim and Berni Love and co-wrote her new single, "Boy" which was released in June 2016.

== Discography ==
=== Digital singles ===
*2011 – "Mono I Agapi"

*2012 – "Mamacita Buena" (Claydee feat. Nikki Lee)
Song credits: Claydee, Chris-Kid, Manolo Vegas

*2012 – "Chiki Chiki" - Nikki Lee
Song credits: Hush Hush, Chris-Kid

*2013 – "Heleya" - Nikki Lee
Song credits: Claydee, Elias Pantazopoulos

*2016 – "Boy" - Nikki Lee
Song credits: Berni Love, Nicole Paparistodemou, Sergio Selim

*2018 – "Dónde Estás" - Nikki Lee & Claydee Feat. Alex Lupa
Song credits: Tim Aeby, Claydee, Andy Nicolas, Bf Junior
