= Valando Tryfonos =

Valando Tryfonos Βαλάντω Τρύφωνος
- Born: 6 March 1988 (age 38)
- Origin: Nicosia, Cyprus
- Genres: Pop, dance
- Occupation: Singer
- Instrument: Vocals
- Years active: 2010–present
- Labels: Sony Music Greece (2010–2011); M2/Universal Music Greece (2012–present)

Valando Tryfonos (Greek: Βαλάντω Τρύφωνος; born 6 March 1988) is a Greek–Cypriot singer who rose to fame after winning the first season of talent show Greek Idol in 2010. She subsequently released the digital single "Sti Dipla Thesi" (In the next seat). In March 2011, she was one of six candidates which competed to represent Greece in the Eurovision Song Contest 2011 with the song "The Time is Now".

Tryfonos had previously participated in the Cypriot national final for the Eurovision Song Contest 2006 with the song "After You" and attempted to take part in Greece's singing competition The X Factor, but did not make the cut.

== Early life ==
Valando Tryfonos was born in Nicosia, Cyprus in 1988. From the age of five she pursued an interest in music, beginning lessons in piano, music theory, harmony, and solfège, while she also performed in her school's choir as a lead soloist. Growing up she was also a member of the European Youth Parliament, where she had the opportunity to perform at their parliament sessions. At the age of 15, her group was invited to a celebration by the Cypriot embassy in Finland where she performed.

After years of practice, she was first introduced to the public in 2006 at the age of 17 when she took part in the Cypriot national final for the Eurovision Song Contest 2006 with the song "After You". Her bid for the final initially started as a joke between herself and her friends Giannis Haralambous and Natasha Tyrimos, who decided to write a song at the last minute to send to Cyprus Broadcasting Corporation (CyBC), not expecting it to pass. CyBC ended up accepting the entry and Trifonos performed the song in the final placing fourth. Although Tryfonos received the most votes from the public, she was not declared the winner, as CyBC calculated results in a different manner. This caused complaints to be filed with the broadcaster from multiple participants citing that the rules were not clear, ensuing an investigation. The investigation concluded that the published regulations stated that only televoting would be used, but did not clarify how it would employed in the final decision; The common perception was that the song that garnered the most votes would win. CyBC however, claimed that the public had been notified of the exact manner that the televotes would be used through television commercials and by the event hosts, thereby maintaining its previously declared winner.

Later in 2006, Tryfonos began attending Queen Mary, University of London, where she studied environmental science. After completing her studies at Queen Mary, she moved to Athens in 2009 where she took vocal lessons at Fame Studio for approximately four months.

== Greek Idol ==
Shortly after moving to Athens, Tryfonos attended the Athens auditions for the first season of Greek Idol. There she received all yes votes from the judges along with praise, while judge Kostas Kapetanidis predicted that she would be in the top ten. Tryfonos initially did not want to audition for the show, but did so after encouragement from family and friends, as well as after having viewed a television commercial for the show; producers called her back the next day. She had not told anyone she was auditioning besides her brother and best friend, and instead told her parents about it shortly before the first episode was set to air. Tryfonos had also previously auditioned for the second season of rival Greek talent competition The X Factor, and passed the audition phase before ultimately being cut before the live shows. In response, she later stated that she did not want to join any reality show as she did not want to be judged on anything other than her voice, but auditioned for Greek Idol as she believed it was more of a simple talent show. Throughout the competition, she was considered a favourite to win. Recalling her experience on the show later on, she stated that she thought she would make it as a finalist onto the live shows with some difficulty, but never expected to win the completion. Following recall rounds and ten live shows, Trifonos came first in the competition and won a recording contract with Sony Music Entertainment Greece.

=== Performances ===
In the course of the competition, Tryfonos performed the following songs:

Week #	Theme	Song choice	Original artist	Order #	Result
Audition	N/A	"Stereotipa"	Dimitra Galani	N/A	Advanced
Athens recall	N/A	"Paparazzi" "Dithesio" "Me Tin Porta Anihti"	Lady Gaga; Alkistis Protopsalti; Antonis Remos	N/A	Advanced
Top 15	Contestant's favourite	"Trava Skandali"	Alkistis Protopsalti	7	Advanced
Top 10	Dance hits	"Don't Leave Me This Way"	Thelma Houston	6	Safe
Top 9	Movie hits	"To Fili Tis Zois"	Elena Paparizou	1	Safe
Top 8	Today's hits	"Empire State of Mind (Part II) Broken Down"	Alicia Keys	5	Safe
Top 7	Contestant's idol	"Den Thelo Na Ksereis"	Anna Vissi	3	Safe
Top 6	Rock hits	"Piece of My Heart" "Poula Me"	Big Brother and the Holding Company; Pyx Lax	4; 10	Safe
Top 5	Summer hits, Dedications	"Alejandro" "Forever Young"	Lady Gaga; Youth Group	4; 7	Safe
Top 4	Jury's choice	"Sta Dosa Ola" "Sweet Dreams (Are Made of This)"	Despina Vandi; Eurythmics	1; 7	Safe
Top 3	80s hits, 90s hits, 00s hits	"Heaven Is a Place on Earth" "Nothing Compares 2 U" "Dio Meres Mono"	Belinda Carlisle; Sinéad O'Connor; Dimitra Galani	3; 5; 7	Safe
Finale	Previous song, New song, Coronation song	"Trava Skandali" "All by Myself" "Sti Dipla Thesi"	Alkistis Protopsalti; Céline Dion; Valando Tryfonos	2; 3; 5	Winner

== Post-Idol ==
=== 2010–present: Professional debut ===
After winning Greek Idol, the winner's single "Sti Dipla Thesi" (In the next seat), written by Dimitris Kontopoulos who was also a judge on the show, and with lyrics by Nikos Moraitis, was released as a radio single and later a digital download, receiving moderate success. A music video directed by Kostas Kapetanidis, also a judge on the show, was released shortly after on 13 July 2010. Later in July 2010, Trifonos performed at singer Anna Vissi's Cypriot concert tour along with contest runner up Nicole Paparistodimou, after receiving an invitation from Vissi following her appearance in the finale of Greek Idol. On 20 August 2010, Tryfonos started opening for Giannis Ploutarhos' concert series at Odeon Theater in Thessaloniki until its finale about a month later.

In late September 2010, Tryfonos took part in two concerts in Cyprus with Stavros Michalakakos, where they performed film hits together. Their collaboration was further extended with two more shows in Cyprus in December 2010, where they performed Christmas melodies together. On 3 December 2010, Tryfonos started opening for Giannis Parios' and Stamatis Gonidis' concert series at club Fever. Throughout this time, Tryfonos had been in the studio recording songs with Dimitris Kontopoulos, while in an interview with Mega Channel Cyprus' Gia Sena in early December 2010, Trifonos further stated that she expected to release a new single soon.

On 11 January 2011, Greece's Hellenic Broadcasting Corporation (ERT) announced that Trifonos was one of six participants in a national final to select Greece's entry in the Eurovision Song Contest 2011. She competed with the song "The Time is Now" but did not manage to win. The song was released as a digital single in February 2011, while it was later revealed that she would release her debut album sometime in mid-2011.

In an interview with Star Channel's Made in Star in early November 2011, Valando confirmed that she had left her record label Sony Music Entertainment Greece. Trifonos citing artistic differences as one of the reasons, while she further stated that she was currently in the process of searching for a new label.

In October 2011, Tryfonos started appearing alongside Michalis Hatzigiannis at his shows in Greece, Cyprus, Europe and North America. Realizing her potential, Hatzigiannis signed Valando to his label M2 in co-operation with Universal Music Greece in 2012. She subsequently released her first single on the label in July 2012, titled "Na Mou Exigisis" (Explain to me) penned by Hatzigiannis with lyrics by Eleana Vrahali.

== Discography ==
=== Digital singles ===
- 2006 – "After You"
- 2010 – "Sti Dipla Thesi"
- 2011 – "The Time is Now"
- 2012 – "Na Mou Eksigiseis"

Awards and achievements
New title	Greek Idol winner 2010	Succeeded by Panagiotis Tsakalakos
