= Ada Livitsanou =

Greek actress and singer

- Άντα Λιβιτσάνου
- Born: 23 July 1979 (age 47); Athens, Greece

Ada Livitsanou (Greek: Άντα Λιβιτσάνου; born 23 July 1979) is a Greek actress and singer. She is best known for her role as Lola in Lola, the Greek edition of the television series Lalola.

Livitsanou is an actress who has starred in theatrical performances, TV serials and presented fashion shows. She also sings in two indie rock bands, one of them named "VOLT".

On 30 January 2009, Livitsanou appeared as a guest on the season finale of The X Factor (Greece) where she sang "Think".

On 19 January 2010, Alpha TV announced that Livitsanou would be the host of Greek Idol.

== Filmography ==
=== Television ===
Year	Title	Role	Notes
2000-2001	Vathi Kokkino (Deep Red)	Stella	Series regular (30 episodes)
2001-2002	Ti Simvainei Me Ton Harry? (There' s something about Harry)	Despina	Series regular (12 episodes)
2003-2004	To Paihnidi Tis Signomis (The Sorry Game)	Jenny	Series regular (31 episodes)
2004-2005	Erastis Ditikon Proastion (Lover of Western Suburbs)	Gogo Founta	Lead role (33 episodes)
2005-2006	I Adelfi, Tis Adelfis, Tis Adelfis Mou (The Sister of my Sister' s Sister)	Mira	Lead role (20 episodes)
2006-2007	Pali apo tin arhi (Let' s start again!)	Anna	Lead role (18 episodes)
2006-2007	Margarita	Marily	7 episodes
2007	10i entoli (10th command)	Despina	Episode: "Hidden truth"
2007	Pira Kokkina Gialia (I wear red glasses)	Aliki	1 episode
2007-2008	Coupling	Anna	Lead role (10 episodes), remake of the British television comedy show Coupling
2008-2009	Lola	Lola Lalou	Lead role (202 episodes), remake of the Argentine telenovela Lalola
2009	National Beauty Pageant	Herself (judge)	TV special
2009-2010	Kos & Ka Pels (Mr & Mrs Pels)	Agapi Pels	Lead role (13 episodes), remake of the Argentine telenovela Los exitosos Pells
2010	Greek Idol	Herself (host)	Season 2
2011-2013	Klemmena Oneira (Stolen Dreams)	Cristy Stefanou	Lead role (230 episodes)
2013	Your Face Sounds Familiar	Herself (contestant)	Season 1
2015-2016	Joy	Herself (host)	Pastry chef column
2018	Min arhizeis ti Mourmoura (Don't start moaning)	Nia	1 episode
2020-still	Kan' to pio Oreo (Make It Oreo)	Herself (host)	Weekend pastry show
