= Mike Hennessy =

British rower

Mike Hennessy is a British rower, who represented Great Britain at the 2004 Summer Olympics in Athens.

== Career ==
Hennessy began rowing in 1995 whilst at Queen Mary, University of London for the university boat club. Quickly making a name for himself, he was national lightweight single scull champion in 1999, before making his GB international debut in 2001 and finished fifth in the lightweight eight at the world championships. He then raced in the four in 2002, reached the final of two world cups and the B Final of the world champs.

The following year, Hennessy raced in the lightweight men’s four at the Lucerne World Cup Finals (2003) before going on to finish sixth in the lightweight eight and fourth in the lightweight men’s pair at the Milan World Cup (2003).

During 2004, Hennessy represented Great Britain at the Summer Olympics in Athens, and was winner of the GB National Team Trials in the lightweight men’s pair in 2004 and was part of the lightweight men’s four at all three world cups in 2004.

In 2006 he was part of the crew that set a course record at Head of the River Fours

Hennessy currently rows for the Tideway Scullers.
