= Greek Idol =

- Created by: Fremantle Media & Alpha TV
- Directed by: Periklis Vas. Asproulias
- Presented by: Roula Koromila; Anta Livitsanou (Audition Shows) (2010)
- Judges: Dimitris Kontopoulos (2010); Maro Theodoraki (2010); Kostas Kapetanidis; Petros Kostopoulos; Elli Kokkinou (2011)
- Countries of origin: Greece; Cyprus
- Original language: Greek
- No. of seasons: 2
- No. of episodes: 36

Production
- Producer: Constantin Entertainment

Original release
- Network: Alpha TV
- Release: 5 March 2010 – 25 June 2011

Related
- Super Idol

Greek Idol is a reality television competition to find new solo singing talent. Part of the Idol franchise, it is based on the British show Pop Idol created by Simon Fuller. The first season of the show debuted on March 5, 2010 on Alpha TV. The second season premiered on 19 February 2011. The show is broadcast simultaneously by Sigma TV in Cyprus.

The program, which also held auditions in Cyprus, aimed to discover the best singer with the winner determined by the viewers. Through telephone and SMS text voting, viewers chose Valanto Trifonos as the winner of season one.

The series employed a panel of judges who critique the contestants' performances. The original three judges were songwriter and record producer Dimitris Kontopoulos, music instructor Maro Theodoraki, and music video director Kostas Kapetanidis, with media proprietor Petros Kostopoulos was added as a fourth judge at the start of the first live show. As of the second season, the judging panel consisted of Kostopoulos, Kapetanidis, and singer Elli Kokkinou. The show was hosted by Roula Koromila.

== Background ==
Greek Idol replaced Super Idol, a Greek show of the Idol series held in 2004 that was hosted by Themis Georgantas on Mega Channel. The winner was Stavros Konstantinou. Due to low ratings, Mega Channel had decided to cancel Super Idol after the inaugural 2004 season.

Alpha TV expressed desire to revive the show in a revamped version. It was first revealed to the public on December 15, 2009 when Alpha TV began airing the first advertisement. The name was also changed from Super Idol to Greek Idol and the new logo launched.

=== Hosts ===
A number of Greek entertainers had been rumored as potential hosts of the show, haven gone through screen tests. On January 19, 2010, Alpha TV announced that actress Anta Livitsanou would host the show. Livitsanou had previously appeared as a guest on the season finale of rival singing competition The X Factor where she sang "Think".

However, it was revealed on April 20, 2010 that Roula Koromila would be the new host of the show as of April 26, 2010 when the "live shows" would begin. Anta Livitsanou still was present on the show though, presenting backstage segments. Following the conclusion of season 1, Anta Livitsanou announced she would not return for the second installment. Roula Koromila returned to host season 2.

=== Judges ===
Shortly after announcing the show, Alpha TV started airing a new ad on December 22, 2009 announcing Nikos Karvelas as the head judge. On January 20, 2010, it was rumored that Karvelas will not be part of Greek Idol, and had left for undisclosed reasons. On January 21, 2010, one day before auditions began, Alpha TV confirmed that Karvelas had left the show, and thanked him for his work up until that point. Although Alpha TV and Karvelas did not state the reason for his departure, various news outlets reported that it was due to comments made by host Anta Livitsanou after being picked, downplaying the judges roles, and stating that the judges have little say in the competition, as well as other potential jury picks Karvelas did not agree with. On the same day, it was announced that singer Giannis Kotsiras would be a judge on the show, but on January 23, 2010 Kotsiras revealed that he would not take part in the show and thanked Alpha for their enthusiasm with him.

On January 24, 2010, Alpha announced that the judges for the show would be songwriter Dimitris Kontopoulos, music teacher and author Maro Theodoraki, who is also the niece of composer Mikis Theodorakis, and video director Kostas Kapetanidis.

Petros Kostopoulos, media proprietor and president of Imako Media S.A., served as a guest fourth guest judge to the show on April 26, 2010 with the premiere of the first live shows. At the start of the second live show on May 3, 2010, it was announced that Petros Kostopoulos would become the fourth permanent judge for the rest of the season.

Following the end of season one, Dimitris Kontopoulos and Maro Theodoraki announced they would not reprise their roles as judges for the season. Kontopoulos came to the decision to walk away from the show citing the need for more time to focus on his work and music. Maro Theodraki announced she would not return as well, citing scheduling issues with her work, while mentioning that the decision was mutual with Alpha TV.

Following Kontopoulos and Theodoraki's departures, Alpha TV began actively seeking replacements. In September 2010, singer Elena Paparizou confirmed that Alpha TV had asked her to be a judge for season two, although she declined the offer saying she is still too young to judge her peers. In October 2010, it was reported that singer Elli Kokkinou agreed to be a judge for the second season. Alpha TV later announced on October 26, 2010 that the judges for the second season would be three instead of four, and would consist of Elli Kokkinou, Petros Kostopoulos, and Kostas Kapetanidis.

=== Spin Offs ===
A special show titled All About Greek Idol hosted by Themis Georgantas premiered on April 10, 2010 when the "recall rounds" began, and aired weekly on Saturdays following each show. The show, which is similar to American Idol Extra, features what goes on behind the scenes of the show as well as interviews with the contestants.

== Season 1 (2010) ==
The first season of Greek Idol premiered on 5 March 2010 on Alpha TV.

Contestant	Week 1 4/26^{1}	Week 2 5/3	Week 3 5/10	Week 4 5/17	Week 5 5/24	Week 6 5/31	Week 7 6/7	Week 8 6/14	Week 9 6/21	Week 10 6/28
Valanto Trifonos	Safe	Safe	Safe	Safe	Safe	Safe	Safe	Safe	Safe	Winner (week 10)
Nicole Paparistodimou	Safe	Safe	Safe	Safe	Safe	Bottom	Bottom	Safe	Safe	Runner-up (week 10)
Nikos Tasiopoulos	^{3}							Bottom	Bottom	Eliminated (week 9)
Stergios Ntaousanakis	Safe	Bottom	Safe	Bottom	Bottom	Safe	Safe	Bottom	Eliminated (week 8)	
Christos Tsakiris^{2}	Safe	Safe	Safe	Safe	Safe	Safe	Safe	Withdrew (week 7)		
Antigoni Psihrami	Safe	Safe	Safe	Safe	Safe	Safe	Bottom	Eliminated (week 7)		
Giorgos Douros	Bottom	Safe	Bottom	Safe	Bottom	Bottom	Eliminated (week 6)			
Diogenis Frantzanas	Safe	Bottom	Safe	Bottom	Bottom	Eliminated (week 5)				
Gloria Oghomwen	Safe	Safe	Safe	Bottom	Eliminated (week 4)					
Vasilis Logothetis	Bottom	Bottom	Bottom	Eliminated (week 3)						
Tania Karra	Bottom	Bottom	Eliminated (week 2)							
Dimitris Evripiotis (Jimmy Sion)	Bottom	Eliminated (week 1)								
Athina Lianou	Bottom	Eliminated (week 1)								
Christina Lakoumenta	Bottom	Eliminated (week 1)								
Aristeidis Komninakis	Bottom	Eliminated (week 1)								
Ioanna Zervolea	Bottom	Eliminated (week 1)								

- ^{1} Top 15 narrowed down to top 10 in one night
- ^{2} Following the 7th live show, Christos Tsakiris decided to quit the show voluntarily after learning that he would be forced to sing an English song the next week. This came after increased tensions between Tsakiris and the judges after a performance of an English song the week prior, where he sang "Na-na-na" in place of the actual lyrics.
- ^{3}Nikos Tasiopoulos was brought in by Alpha TV to replace Christos Tsakiris after his withdrawal. Tasiopoulos had not previously made it to the top 15.

== Season 2 (2011) ==
Alpha TV announced that the show had been renewed for a second season early on, and called for auditions in October 2010. Season 2 premiered on 19 February 2011, and featured a shake up in the judging panel.

Contestant	Week 1 4/16^{1}	Week 2 4/25	Week 3 4/30	Week 4 5/7	Week 5 5/14	Week 6 5/21	Week 7 5/28	Week 8 6/4	Week 9 6/11	Week 10 6/18
Panagiotis Tsakalakos	Safe	Safe	Safe	Bottom	Safe	Safe	Bottom	Bottom	Safe	Winner (week 10)
Malou Kiriakopoulou	Safe	Safe	Safe	Safe	Bottom	Safe	Safe	Safe	Bottom	Runner-up (week 10)
Maria Theodotou	Safe	Safe	Bottom	Safe	Safe	Bottom	Safe	Safe	Bottom	Eliminated (week 9)
Giorgos Xilouris	Safe	Bottom	Safe	Safe	Safe	Safe	Safe	Bottom	Eliminated (week 8)	
Aris Plaskassovitis	Safe	Safe	Bottom	Safe	Safe	Safe	Bottom	Eliminated (week 7)		
Erofili Tzanou	Bottom	Safe	Safe	Bottom	Bottom	Bottom	Eliminated (week 6)			
Keren Tamami	Bottom	Bottom	Safe	Bottom	Bottom	Eliminated (week 5)				
Dimitris Tiktopoulos	Safe	Safe	Safe	Bottom	Eliminated (week 4)					
Katerina Koukouraki	Safe	Safe	Bottom	Eliminated (week 3)						
Konstantinos Frantzis	Bottom	Bottom	Eliminated (week 2)							
Marianna Malantzi	Bottom	Eliminated (week 1)								
Chrisa Bandeli	Bottom	Eliminated (week 1)								
Katerina Morena	Bottom	Eliminated (week 1)								
Chrisanthos Kanteres	Bottom	Eliminated (week 1)								
Christos Tsoumanis	Bottom	Eliminated (week 1)								

- ^{1} Top 15 narrowed down to top 10 in one night

== See also ==
- Super Idol (An earlier 2004 Idol series on Mega Channel)
- The X Factor (Greece)
- Antigoni Psixrami
