= To Party Arhizei =

2008 concert tour by Helena Paparizou

- Tour by Helena Paparizou
- The official promotional poster of the tour.
- Associated album: Vrisko To Logo Na Zo
- Start date: July 2, 2008
- End date: September 19, 2008
- Legs: 1
- No. of shows: 29 in Greece (1 canceled)

Helena Paparizou concert chronology
- Mera Me Ti Mera and My Number One Tour (2005); To Party Arhizei (2008); Fysika Mazi With Onirama (2010)

To Party Arhizei (Greek: Το πάρτυ αρχίζει; English: The party is starting) is the first official large-scale concert tour by Greek contemporary laïka and pop singer Helena Paparizou and her first tour of Greece as a solo artist. The tour took place during the summer of 2008, and kicked off at the National Stadium in Kalamata on July 2, 2008, ending in Athens on September 19, 2008. The final concert at Theatro Vrahon in Athens was recorded, and released as a bonus DVD on Vrisko To Logo Na Zo: Deluxe Edition titled Live in Concert. Overall, the concert tour was a moderate success for Paparizou, with an audience total of approximately 192,000 over 29 concerts and one sold-out venue. Alpha TV broadcast the concert on television on December 30, 2008 as part of their holiday music schedule.

== Background ==
The 2008 tour was Paparizou's first large-scale tour of her career and first tour of Greece as a solo artist; she claimed she felt that she owed something to the Greek people. During the tour, Paparizou visited many cities all over the Greece for the first time as a solo performer (she had formerly visited some places as a member of Antique). Prior to the release of her album, Paparizou asked her fans to request their favorite songs that they would like to hear on the tour through her official Facebook page. Paparizou toured in all provinces of Greece, visiting both some large cities and many smaller towns and islands where she would not otherwise have the opportunity to perform. Manos Pirovolakis toured with her as the opening act. Other guest performers included hip-hop group Stavento who appeared in select venues. Paparizou came into collaboration with the group a few weeks prior when she made a featuring appearance during their performance at the 2008 MAD Video Music Awards, singing a chorus from their hit "Mesa Sou". The shows included songs from Paparizou's album Vrisko To Logo Na Zo and songs since the start of her solo career, as well as from her Antique recordings and covers and duets with Pirovolakis and Stavento. The kick-off party took place on June 25, 2008. During the tour, it was reported that ticket sales reached 190,000 after twenty-eight concerts. However, following the end of the tour Sony Music Greece printed the official attendance numbers of the tour, revealing that the 29 performances had a total attendance of approximately 192,000, averaging 6,620 tickets a show. The ticket sales of the planned 30th show were not included due to availability for refunds as the concert was cancelled due to bad weather conditions. The lowest attendances of the entire tour were on the islands of Chios and Kos with 3,500 attendants each, while Orestiada had the largest attendance of the tour with 18,000 people. Paparizou achieved five-figure ticket sales in three shows: Orestiada (18,000), Serres (12,000), and Patras (11,000), however, the audiences of the former two cities were joint in other events; Paparizou performed as a part of the Arda's Festival and commenced the Enduro World Championship respectively. Despite that she had higher attendance numbers in some other cities, she only managed to sell out the Thessaloniki venue with 7,500 spectators. Overall it was a moderate success; with ticket costs at €20, the tour should have grossed €3.84 million from ticket sales not including the cost of merchandise. Fokas Evangelinos, who choreographed Paparizou's Eurovision Song Contest 2005-winning performance of "My Number One", directed the choreography, while Paparizou teamed up with soft drink company Ivi as the main sponsor of her tour. Nokia was also a sponsor of the tour, as well as Alpha TV who reserved the rights to film and broadcast it; it was announced that the concert would be shown on Alpha TV in December as part of their holiday music schedule.

== Guest appearances ==
- Manos Pirovolakis (opening act)
- Stavento (guest act, select venues)
- Giorgos Sabanis (guest act, select venues)
- Paschalis Terzis (guest act)

== Set list ==
1. "Porta Gia Ton Ourano"
2. "An Eihes Erthei Pio Noris"
3. "I Kardia Sou Petra"
4. "The Game of Love"
5. "Panda Se Perimena"
6. "Iparhi Logos"
7. "Mambo!
8. "Alli Mia Fora"
9. "Papeles Mojados"
10. "Teardrops"
11. "To Fili Tis Zois"
12. "Agapi San Listia"
13. "Se Pion Na Miliso"
14. "Eisai I Foni"
15. "Mesa Sou" (Duet with Stavento)
16. "Anapandites Kliseis"
17. "I Agapi Sou Den Menei Pia Edo"
18. "Pirotehnimata"
19. "Treli Kardia"
20. "Gigolo"
21. "To 'Heis I Den To 'Heis"
22. "Paradeigmatos Hari"
23. "You Set My Heart on Fire"
24. "Mi Fevgeis"
25. "Just Walk Away"
26. "Astra Mi Me Malonete" (Duet with Manos Pirovolakis)
27. "Teli Teli Teli" (Duet with Manos Pirovolakis)
28. "Lene Gia Mena" (Duet with Manos Pirovolakis)
29. "Ta Smirnaika Tragoudia" (Duet with Manos Pirovolakis)
30. "Dinata Dinata" (Duet with Manos Pirovolakis)
31. "Stis Ekklisias tin Porta" (Duet with Manos Pirovolakis)
32. "My Number One"
33. "Mazi Sou"
34. "The Light in Our Soul/To Fos sti Psyhi"
35. "Porta Gia Ton Ourano"

== Tour dates ==
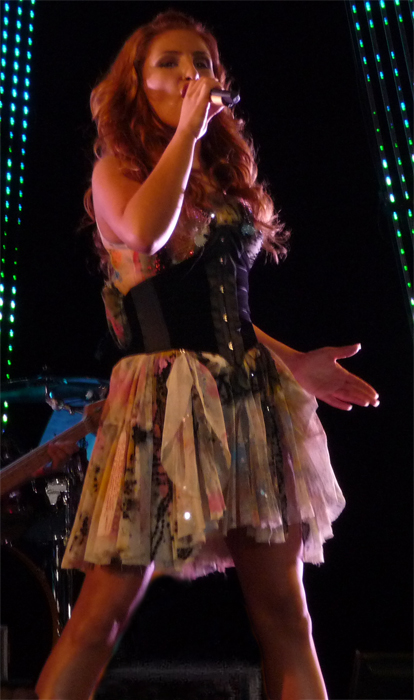
Elena Paparizou performing in Kalamata on July 2, 2008.

Paparizou performing in Lamia on August 28, 2008.

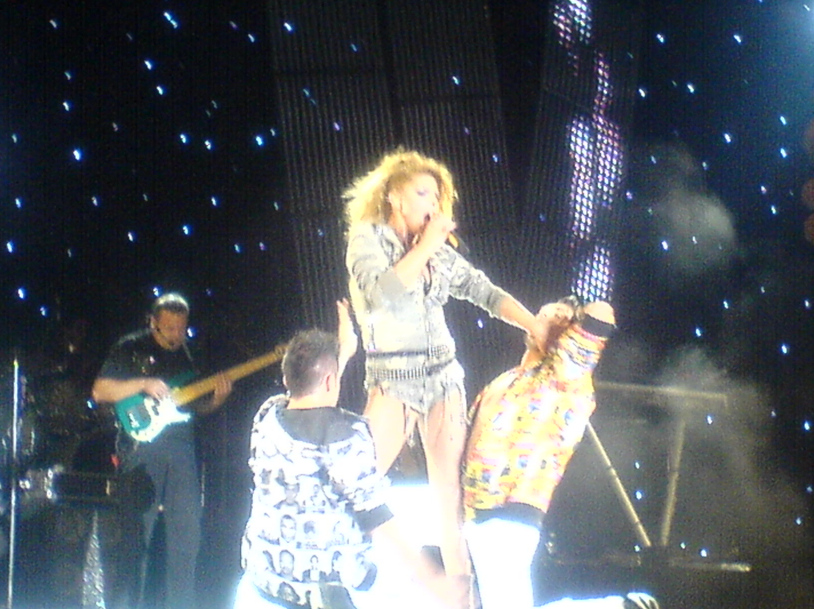
Paparizou performing at "Theatro Vrahon Melina Merkouri" for the September 19 concert.

The tour dates were included in a promo CD which was distributed at the kick-off party, but officially they were announced by the radio station Sfera 102.2 fm which was one of the sponsors. Additional tour dates were added as the tour went into full swing. The last concert of the series was supposed to take place on September 22, but it was canceled due to inclement weather.

All locations within Greece
Date	City	Venue	Attendance
July 2, 2008	Kalamata	National Stadium	6,000
July 12, 2008	Chios	Municipal Stadium	3,500
July 24, 2008	Chrysoupoli	Municipal Stadium	7,500
July 25, 2008	Asprovalta	Municipal Stadium	6,500
July 26, 2008	Chalkidiki	Porto Carras	7,000
July 28, 2008	Veria	Municipal Stadium	5,500
July 31, 2008	Orestiada	Arda's Festival^{1}	18,000
August 2, 2008	Gytheio	Municipal Stadium	6,200
August 5, 2008	Corfu	Musicland	4,500
August 7, 2008	Vonitsa	Nisi	5,600
August 10, 2008	Kalymnos	Kalymnos Municipal Stadium	6,800
August 13, 2008	Zakynthos	Municipal Theatre	4,300^{2}
August 15, 2008	Katerini	Pierikos's Stadium	5,600
August 16, 2008	Nea Kallikratia Chalkidikis	Municipal Theatre	6,200
August 19, 2008	Santorini	Santo Wine	5,700
August 22, 2008	Karditsa	Municipal Stadium	8,800
August 23, 2008	Ptolemaida	Municipal Theatre	4,500
August 25, 2008	Xanthi	Municipal Stadium	4,500
August 27, 2008	Larissa	Alcazar Stadium	8,100
August 28, 2008	Lamia	National Stadium	5,200
August 29, 2008	Kilkis	Lofou Theater	6,000
August 30, 2008	Serres	Motorway^{3}	12,000
September 3, 2008	Thessaloniki	Gis Theater	7,500
September 5, 2008	Volos	National Stadium	5,200
September 8, 2008	Patras	Panachaiki's Stadium	11,000
September 9, 2008	Eleusis	Roumelioti's Stadium	7,000
September 12, 2008	Rhodes	Diagora's Stadium	4,800
September 14, 2008	Kos	Antagora's Stadium	3,500
September 19, 2008	Athens	Theatro Vrahon "Melina Merkouri"	5,000
~~September 22, 2008~~	~~Heraklion~~	~~OFI's Stadium~~^{4}	N/A

- ^{1} Paparizou performed at this venue as a part of Arda's Festival rather than a private concert.
- ^{2} 3,300 audience members were indoors and 1,000 outdoors.
- ^{3} Paparizou performed at this venue as the opening act for the Enduro World Championship rather than a private concert.
- ^{4} The concert was canceled due to bad weather conditions.

== Performers ==
Lead performers

- Vocals: Elena Paparizou, Manos Pirovolakis

Guest Stars

- Stavento, Giorgos Sampanis

Dancers

- Emy Zarian, Nikos Marianos, Giorgos Papadopoulos, Sandy Leulier, Stavriana Garnavou, Anna Athanasiadou

Band members

- Musical director: Thanasis Hondros
- Drums: Kostas Liolios (Konstantinos Liolios is a well-known professional drummer and one of the top musicians currently performing at Greece. Liolios have played with many known artists like Antonis Remos, Anna Vissi, Dimitra Galani, Eleutheria Arbanitaki, Elena Paparizou and many others. He is widely regarded as one of the most charismatic, youngest and talented drummers today.)
- Percussion saxophone: Vasilis Tasopoulos
- Bass: Thanasis Hondros
- Guitar: Fivos Zaharopoulos
- Keyboard piano: Giannis Kifonidis
- Keyboard synthesizer: Kostas Lainas
- Bouzouki tzoura: Evripidis Nikolidis
- Bouzouki: Paschalis Karambourtzidis
- Vocals: Marianna Gerasimidou, Paola Komini, Arlyn Gonzales
- Vocal direction: Alex Panayi

== Credits ==
=== Performance ===
- Director: Kostas Kapetanidis
- Art director: Fokas Evangelinos
- Instrumentation/arrangement: Thanasis Hondros, DONK (Niclas Oaulsson and Toni Mavridis)
- LED/lighting designer: Paris Anagnostopoulos
- Sound: Nikos Chronopoulos, Giannis Xidakis, Spathi Eleni
- Choreography: Fokas Evangelinos

=== Production ===
- Production arrangement: Andri Orfanidou/Galaxias Paragoges, Kostas Christopoulos/Four Seasons
- Production manager: Gerasimos Sideridis
- Tour manager: Konstantinos Bletsas
- Communications and public relations: Giannis Koutrakis, Hara Zafarika/Piarista O.E.
- Television production: OBVAM AGM
- Video operator and G-LEC engineer: Elias Binieris
- Technicians: Andreas Georgiou, Michalis Petridis, Giorgos Tikou, Alexis Paterlis, Alexis Petraï, Giannis Triandafyllou, Dinos Freskos, Babis Tsakoumatos, Dimitris Andriannos, Gouseff Chalil
- Editing: Tasos Bitsakakis
- Post-production: Art Factory

=== Personnel ===
- Make-up: Giannis Marketakis (effex+)
- Hair: Christos Kalaniotis (effex+)
- Styling: Al Giga (Elena Paparizou), Kostas Zisis (dancers)
- Backstage personal management: Filio Zioga, Vergos Michalis
