= Fos (EP) =

EP by Helena Paparizou
- Released: May 2007 (Greece)
- Recorded: 2006–April 2007
- Genre: Pop
- Label: Sony BMG/RCA

Helena Paparizou chronology
| The Game of Love | Fos | To Fili Tis Zois |

Singles from Fos
- 1. "Fos" Released: July 2006; 2. "Mazi Sou" Released: March 2007; 3. "Min Fevgeis" Released: May 2007

Fos (Greek: Φως; English: Light) is an EP by Greek artist, Helena Paparizou. It was released on 18 May 2007 by Sony BMG Greece and was featured as a bonus CD on the repackaged Yparhi Logos: Platinum Edition album. The CD single contains "Fos", along with four other new tracks, including "Mazi Sou" and a cover of "Le Temps des Fleurs". "Mazi Sou" is the only original song on the EP, the rest are covers.

The CD-Single release went straight to number one in its release in Greece.

The song, "Fos", itself, was recorded in 2006 for the soundtrack of the new Greek Barbie and the 12 Dancing Pricess'movie, it is the Greek version of the song "Shine" by American singer Cassidy Ladden.

The third CD on the Yparhi Logos: Platinum Edition album, was entitled "Fos", and contained the five songs available on the single, and two bonus tracks.

== Music video ==
A music video for the title track was released in August 2006 as a bonus feature on the Barbie soundtrack.

== Track listing ==
Greek CD Single

1. "Mazi Sou"
2. "Min Fevgis"
3. "Le Temps Des Fleurs"
4. "An Esy M'agapas" (Pour que tu m'aimes encore)
5. "Fos" (Shine)

Iparhi Logos CD 3

1. "Mazi Sou"
2. "Min Fevgis"
3. "Le Temps Des Fleurs"
4. "An Esy M'agapas" (Pour que tu m'aimes encore)
5. "Fos" (Shine)
6. "Pou Pige Tosi Agapi (Summer Moonlight Mix)"
7. "I Agapi Sou Den Meni Pia Edo" (Aşkın Açamadığı Kapı (Adam Gibi))

== Charts ==
| Chart | Providers | Peak position | Certification | Sales |
|---|---|---|---|---|
| Greek Singles Chart | IFPI | 1 | Gold | 10,000 |
| Greek Annual Singles Chart | IFPI | 4 | | |
