= Vrisko To Logo Na Zo =

Vrisko To Logo Na Zo Βρίσκω Το Λόγο Να Ζω

Studio album by Helena Paparizou
- Released: June 11, 2008
- Recorded: Fall 2007 – January 2008
- Genres: Pop, pop rock, pop-folk, electronica
- Length: 49:44
- Language: Greek
- Label: Sony BMG Greece/RCA
- Producers: DON - K (Toni Mavridis, Niclas Olausson)

Helena Paparizou chronology
The Game of Love (2006)	Vrisko To Logo Na Zo; Βρίσκω Το Λόγο Να Ζω (2008)	Giro Apo T' Oneiro (2010)

Singles from Vrisko To Logo Na Zo
- 1. "To Fili Tis Zois" Released: 26 September 2007; 2. "Porta Gia Ton Ourano" Released: 8 April 2008; 3. "I Kardia Sou Petra" Released: 2 June 2008; 4. "Pirotehnimata" Released: 22 December 2008; 5. "Eisai I Foni" Released: 25 February 2009

Vrisko To Logo Na Zo (Greek: Βρίσκω Το Λόγο Να Ζω; English: "I find the reason to live") is the third Greek-language studio album and fifth studio album overall by Greek singer Helena Paparizou, released on June 12, 2008 by Sony BMG Greece. It was the first time that "DON - K" (Niclas Olausson and Toni Mavridis) had produced an entire album. It was also the first time for Paparizou to contribute to an album both musically and lyrically. It was also the first time that a duet was included on one of her solo albums.

The album was re-released on December 22, 2008 as Vrisko To Logo Na Zo: The Deluxe Edition.

The Deluxe Edition comes in a special rectangular case containing the original CD and case, the Summer tour DVD, as well as a bonus poster with various photos from her summer tour. There were original plans to release the album once again as a "Special Edition" with additional tracks including the digital single "Tha Mai Allios", as well as many of her songs from the 2009 MAD Secret Concert, six new duets, and a duet with the Italian band Silky Sunday called "Pothoi" (Siga Psithirista). However, the change of plans led to Paparizou releasing a brand new Greek studio album in early 2010.

== Production ==
Paparizou reportedly said that she started writing songs with her team after the Christmas Holidays when she got back from Sweden. The album was recorded in two countries—Greece and Sweden, some specifically in her own professional home studio in Glyfada, Athens. In an interview on MAD TV, Paparizou said that she cooperated with very popular and prestigious producers. The main producers were Niclas Olausson and Toni Mavridis. Paparizou announced that the writers and composers who participated wrote many hit songs, such as Giorgos Sabanis who composed "To Fili Tis Zois", Giorgos Moukidis who produced many of the Laika songs, Giannis Christodoulopoulos, Giannis Doksas who wrote the lyrics for the song "To Fili Tis Zois", Eleana Vrahali who wrote the lyrics for the song "Porta Gia Ton Ourano".

=== Genres and themes ===
Paparizou described her album's style "more rock than ever". She also said that the album will contain songs with strong Greek elements from big producers such as Giorgos Moukidis and ballads from Eleana Vrahali. Finally she stated that it will be included two foreign covers one of which will be a duet but the songs are still kept secret. When the track list was revealed, the duet was announced to be "Papeles Mojados" with the Spanish flamenco-electronic band, Chambao. Overall, three of the 12 tracks on the album are covers, while "To Fili Tis Zois" was added as a bonus track. The photography of the cover is from Kostas Avgoulis who represents a new fresh Paparizou. In the interview on Orange fm 93.2 Elena said that in this album there are some of the hardest songs she has ever sung like "Mathe Prota N'Agapas" which is a powerful ballad. In the interview on NitroRadio Elena said that a new version of the song Pirotehnimata would be released in order to promote the song in clubs and it would be more upbeat and dance.

== Release ==
The release date of the album changed many times. It was first announced by Paparizou in an interview on MAD TV that the album was going to be released on May 29, 2008, but it was pushed back and a new release date of June 6, 2008 was announced on Paparizou's official Facebook. Several music stores, however, had posted a different one: June 5, 2008. Finally, in an interview on Orange FM on June 2, 2008, Paparizou stated that the album would be released on June 12, 2008, however, on June 11, 2008 the album was available through online download retailers such as the Greek iTunes. On June 13 it was released on all major European iTunes. The album was released as Vrisko To Logo Na Zo: The Deluxe Edition on December 22 to contain a bonus DVD. The DVD includes the Paparizou's concert in Athens, which was held in September 2008. The director is Kostas Kapetanidis and this DVD consists of 19 solo songs performed by Helena and 3 duets performed by Helena, Stavento and Manos Pirovolakis. Furthermore, the DVD includes bonus backstage material, which consists of a Helena's interview before the concert and the Helena's rehearsal of the concert. The creative visual was made by MAD TV.

== Promotion ==
In an interview on MAD TV, Paparizou stated that she would start a summer tour across the large cities of Greece to promote it her new album with Manos Pirovolakis. The tour started in the end of June with two concerts and ended in September. Also notable was that Paparizou announced that she would conduct a Facebook chat with fans through her official account when the album is released and she asked from her fans to post their favorite song in her official account in order to sing it on the tour.

In an interview on the Madame Figaro, Paparizou stated that this is her third album and the best of her career. After finishing the recording sessions, Elena started full promo of the album. On 2 June 2008, Elena Paparizou was on the Greek radio station Orange fm 93.2, where she presented all her new songs for the first time. On 10 June 2008, Paparizou was on NitroRadio 102.5 at 1:00 pm where she talked about her new album.

On 11 June 2008, Paparizou was the guest in the show "Gros Plan" with host Nikos Aliagas which was shown on Alpha TV. Viewers will be able to watch the recording sessions and backstage from the new album. On 13 June 2008, Paparizou gave another interview on MAD radio 106.2 where she talked about the new album, her 6 nominations and she voted her favorite artists. On 16 June 2008, Paparizou performed in the final of the show So You Think You Can Dance where she performed older hits and new songs like "Porta Gia Ton Ourano", "I Kardia Sou Petra" for the very first time in television. She also danced a sexy tango choreography with one of the judges, Jason Roditis.

On 17 June 2008, Paparizou performed at the Mad Video Music Awards 2008 where she won 2 of her 6 nominations. She performed a remix of the song Porta Gia Ton Ourano with Madonna's 4 Minutes and with the group Stavento.

On July 15, 2008 Elena was on the Greek radio station Village 88.3. She talked about the tour and she revealed that the song "Pirotehnimata" will be the next single from the album. Thousands of fans all over the world sent messages via Internet expressing their love to Elena. She announced that she will give a concert in Lithuania in September. On July 23, 2008 Elena was on the Greek radio station Cosmoradio 95.1 where she said that she has started recording her new English album and it will be ready in 2009. Also she stated that when the English album will be released, she will travel abroad for a while. On June 27, 2008 Elena appeared on the most popular morning show "Kafes Me Tin Eleni" on Alpha TV. She talked about the new album, the tour and she sang two songs only with piano.

In Spring 2009, Paparizou began a second series of concert in support of the album at Thalassa: People's Stage, this time as the sole main act, featuring performances by the groups Stavento and 15:50.

=== To Party Arhizei tour ===
Paparizou performing in Lamia, Greece as part of her Arhizei To Party tour on August 29, 2008

As part of the promotion for the album, Paparizou completed her first big Summer tour around Greece. The tour ran from June 25 to September 19, 2008 and featured an entourage of 10 musicians, dancers, and modern lighting and stage design. The concert included songs from Vrisko To Logo Na Zo as well as old hits, and Paparizou was joined by Manos Pirovolakis. The slogan of the tour was "Arhizei To Party" (The Party Is Starting). Sfera Radio hosted a kick off party for Elena's tour on June 25, 2008; at the same party, Paparizou received the gold certification of album and also a gold certification for the digital sales of "To Fili Tis Zois" as a digital download. The song is the first digital single which was certificated gold in Greece with over 30,000 downloads. A DVD of the tour was released as a part of the album's re-release Vrisko To Logo Na Zo: The Deluxe Edition and will also be shown on Alpha TV in December 2008.

=== Helena Goes Clubbin' ===
To further promote the album, the EP Helena Goes Clubbin' was released in September 2008 by Sony Music Greece and features a compilation of the three covers from the album as well as the new radio edit of "Pirotehnimata", and two remixes that were released to radios. The EP was promotional only and not available for purchase. Two songs from the promotional EP were released as promo singles, although these songs were not considered official singles from Vrisko To Logo Na Zo. The two remixes were from Paparizou's performances at the MAD Video Music Awards 2008, and although the remixes were never officially released on an album, they were subsequently picked up by radio stations and achieved some airplay, while they were also made available as digital singles and ringtones. The songs are the same quality as the televised performances which were performed using a playback track.

== Track listing ==
No.	Title	Lyrics	Music	Length
1.	"I Kardia Sou Petra" (Η Καρδιά Σου Πέτρα; Your heart like stone)	Giannis Doxas	Giorgos Sabanis	4:30
2.	"Kita Brosta" (Κοίτα Μπροστά; Look forward)	Giannis Doxas	Sofi Lindblom, Toni Mavridis, Niclas Olausson	3:42
3.	"Porta Gia Ton Ourano" (Πόρτα Για Τον Ουρανό; Door to the sky)	Eleana Vrahali	Per Liden, Toni Mavridis, Niclas Olausson	2:57
4.	"Pios" (Ποιός; Who)	Giorgos Moukidis	Giorgos Moukidis	4:04
5.	"Agapi San Listia (Historias De Danzon Y De Arrabal)" (Αγάπη Σαν Ληστεία; Love like a robbery)	Giannis Doxas	Aleks Syntek	4:16
6.	"Mathe Prota N'Agapas" (Μάθε Πρώτα Ν'αγαπάς; Learn to love first)	Elena Paparizou & Giannis Doksas	Toni Mavridis, Niclas Olausson, Elena Paparizou	4:15
7.	"Eisai I Foni" (Είσαι η φωνή; You are the voice)	Antonis Pappas	Per Liden, Toni Mavridis, Niclas Olausson	3:21
8.	"Pirotehnimata" (Πυροτεχνήματα; Fireworks)	Giannis Doxas	Giorgos Sabanis	4:13
9.	"De Tha' Me Do" (Δε Θα 'Μαι Εδω; I won't be here)	Vicky Gerothodorou	Toni Mavridis, Niclas Olausson, Elena Paparizou	3:50
10.	"Papeles Mojados with Chambao" (Papeles Mojados)	Giannis Doxas	Flea, Frusciante, Kiedis, Smith	3:16
11.	"To'Heis I De To'Heis (Hip Teens Don't Wear Blue Jeans)" (Το 'Χεις ή Δεν Το 'Χεις; You have it or you don't)	Nikos Gritsis	Frank Popp, Sam Leigh Brown & Phillip Noha	3:28
12.	"Mi Mou Milas Gi' Adio" (Μη Μου Μιλάς Γι'Αντίο; Don't talk to me about a goodbye)	Eleana Vrahali	Matilda Ekevik, Toni Mavridis, Niclas Olausson	3:35

Bonus Track
No.	Title	Lyrics	Music	Length
13.	"To Fili Tis Zois" (Το Φιλή της Ζωής; Kiss of life)	Giannis Doxas	Giorgos Sabanis	3:38
Total length:				49:44

== Singles ==
"To Fili Tis Zois"

"To Fili Tis Zois", originally included on the soundtrack of the same name, was the first single from the album, added as a bonus track. The song reached number one on the Greek Airplay Chart for five weeks in the fall of 2007, making it Paparizou's most successful song to date.

"Porta Gia Ton Ourano"

The second lead single is "Porta Gia Ton Ourano" and it was released to radio stations on April 8, 2008. The music video for "Porta Gia Ton Ourano" features an international feel to it, with Paparizou in a British style phone booth.

"I Kardia Sou Petra"

The second single from the album is "I Kardia Sou Petra" and it was first played exclusively on Orange FM on June 2, 2008 and the music video aired on Paparizou's official YouTube Page. The single gained strong airplay, and reached number one on both the digital download and radio airplay charts. "I Kardia Sou Petra" still remained on the charts even in December.

"Pirotehnimata"

The third single from the album is "Pirotehnimata". Originally scheduled for release in September, the release date was pushed back due to the strong radio airplay for "I Kardia Sou Petra". The music video for the album was filmed in December at Iera Odos in front of a giant video screen, and features a more international feel. The video, like the previous two, was once again directed by Alexandros Gramatopoulos. The song was officially released as a radio single on December 22, 2008, while the video will premiere on a special episode of Mega Star on December 27, 2008. "Pirotehnimata" debuted and peaked at number two on the Billboard Greek Digital Singles Chart for the week of January 24, 2008.

"Eisai I Foni"

The fourth airplay single from the album is "Eisai I Foni" and it was released along with a music video on February 25, 2009. The video was produced using Paparizou's performance of the song at Theatro Vrahon "Melina Merkouri" during her 2008 summer tour. The song was not a success, failing to reach the Top 40 of the Greek Airplay Chart.

=== Other notable tracks ===
"Papeles Mojados"

The song "Papeles Mojados" was a rerecorded version of the original song by Spanish group Chambao, featuring both Spanish and Greek lyrics. The song was not released as an official single, nor did it chart in Greece, but it gained airplay in Spanish clubs and the duet version reached number nine on the charts. Paparizou's duet with Chambao, "Papeles Mojados", has become a hit in many dance clubs in Spain.

"Porta Gia Ton Ourano (MAD VMA Remix)"

The first promotional single is the MAD Video Music Awards 2008 Remix of the lead single from Vrisko To Logo Na Zo, "Porta Gia Ton Ourano". Paparizou performed the song at the awards ceremony on June 17, 2008, where it was remixed with Madonna's "4 Minutes". It was subsequently released as its own digital single on the Greek iTunes store.

"Mesa Sou (MAD VMA Remix)"

The second promo single is the MAD Video Music Awards 2008 Remix of hip hop group Stavento's number-one single, "Mesa Sou", which was released from their album Simera To Giortazo (Today I celebrate). At the awards show, Paparizou made a cameo appearance in their performance, singing one chorus from the song. It was subsequently released as its own digital single on the Greek iTunes store, and, in 2011, it was part of the third disc (New songs/Bonus tracks/Duets) of Elena's first greatest hits album, titled Greatest Hits & More.

== Reception ==
Professional ratings
Review scores
Source	Rating
Avopolis	2.5/5 stars
MusicCorner	(mixed)
miss.gr	4/5 stars

=== Critical reception ===
Vrisko To Logo Na Zo received generally mixed to average reviews from critics, lower than her previous Greek studio album, Iparhi Logos.

=== Commercial response ===
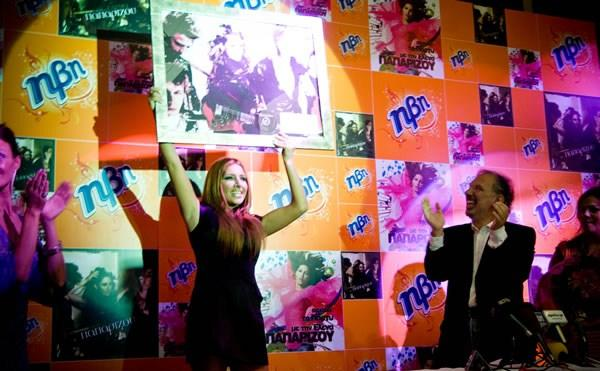
Paparizou receiving a platinum certification plaque in September 2009

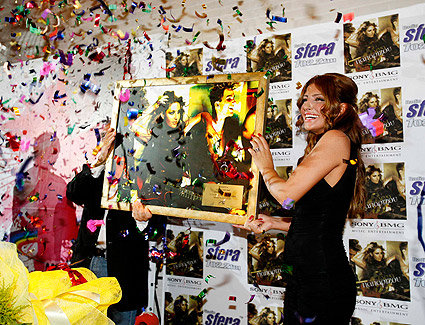
Paparizou receiving a gold certification plaque on June 25, 2008

The album reached at number one on the Greek iTunes Store's Top 10 Albums Chart only three days after its release and was certificated Gold by IFPI Greece after its first week in stores. On the week June 22 to June 28, 2008, the album debuted at number one on the Greek Albums Chart and remained there for five weeks becoming her fourth consecutive number one album. The album also charted in Cyprus for five weeks at number two.

After almost three months, it was announced on September 1, 2008 that the album was certified Platinum, with the certification party being held on September 16, 2008. During the week of August 31 to September 6, 2008, the album returned to number one on the albums chart.

The album was number two on both IFPI's year-end charts- Top 50 Greek albums of 2008 and Top 50 Greek and Foreign Albums of 2008.

== Release history ==
Region	Date	Label	Format	Version
Greece	June 11, 2008	Sony BMG/RCA	Digital download	Original
Greece	June 12, 2008	Sony BMG/RCA	CD	Original
Greece	December 22, 2008	Sony BMG/RCA	CD	Deluxe Edition
Cyprus	June 12, 2008	Sony BMG/RCA	CD	Original
Cyprus	December 22, 2008	Sony BMG/RCA	CD	Deluxe Edition
Europe	June 13, 2008	Sony BMG/RCA	Digital download	Original

== Charts ==
Chart	Peak position	Weeks on chart	Certification
Greek Albums Chart	1	18	Platinum
Cypriot Album Chart	2	27	-
Top 50 Greek Albums of 2008	2	-	-
Top 50 Greek and Foreign Albums of 2008	2	-	-
