= Mazi Sou (song) =

"Μαζί Σου (Mazi Sou)"

Single by Helena Paparizou

from the album Iparhi Logos: Platinum Edition
- Released: May 2007
- Recorded: 2007
- Genre: Pop
- Length: 3:26
- Label: Sony BMG Greece/RCA
- Songwriter: Eleni Vrahali
- Producer: Giannis Christodoulopoulos

Elena Paparizou minor singles chronology
"Teardrops" (2007)	""Mazi Sou" (2007)	"Min Fevgeis" (2007)

"Mazi Sou" (Greek: Μαζί Σου; English: With You) is a song by Greek artist, Helena Paparizou. It was released on the official 'Mazi Sou Soundtrack' as a track on the bonus CD of Υπάρχει Λόγος: Platinum Edition album, and was also a promo and radio single.

== Song information ==
At first it was released in Greece at the beginning of 2007 as the opening theme tune to Greek TV drama, Mazi Sou. Then It was released on May 18, 2007, on a CD single, "Fos", along with four other new tracks, including "Min Fevgis" and a cover of "Le Temps Des Fleurs".

== Track listing ==
1. "Mazi Sou
2. "Na Ksipnao Kai Na Mai Mazi Sou" (Edo Na Zeis)

== Music video ==
The music video was directed by Giorgos Gavalos one of the biggest directors in Greece. The video starts showing many scenes from the serial and then Elena starts singing on a lake with many candles around her. Many special effects are used when Elena is singing. Then many scenes are shown changing quickly behind Elena.

== Chart performance ==
The song was another commercial success for Elena. It topped the Nielsen's Official Radio Airplay chart in Greece staying at the top for 12 weeks. After the smash success of the song on airplay chart, when the single Fos was released it peaked number one on the Greek Singles Chart and stayed in the chart for 40 weeks.Finally the single was certified Gold.

Chart	Peak position
Greek Airplay Chart	1 (12 weeks)
