= An Ihes Erthi Pio Noris =

Single by Helena Paparizou

from the album Iparhi Logos
- Released: December 2006
- Recorded: 2006
- Genre: Pop
- Length: 4:05
- Label: Sony BMG Greece/RCA
- Songwriter: Antonis Pappas
- Producer: Nikos Orfanos

Elena Paparizou minor singles chronology
| "Gigolo" (2006) | "An Ihes Erthi Pio Noris" (2006) | "Mazi Sou" (2007) |

"An Ihes Erthi Pio Noris" (Greek: Αν Ειχες Ερθει Πιο Νωρις; English: If You Had Come Earlier) is a song by Greek singer Helena Paparizou. It was released on the album Iparhi Logos as the last single.

== Song information ==
The song was successful in Greek radios along the video clip was played on MAD TV continually. Helena has performed this track since 2007 to date in all her resident shows in Athens and her tours Arhizei To Partyin 2008 and Fisika Mazi in 2010.

== Track listing ==
1. An Ihes Erthi Pio Noris

== Music video ==
Helena is at the Elliniko tram depot, singing for her lost love across various tram locations, as well as on a tram vehicle itself.
