= Heroes (Helena Paparizou song) =

2006 Elena Paparizou song

Single by Helena Paparizou

from the album The Game of Love
- Released: 9 August 2006
- Recorded: 2006
- Genre: Pop folk
- Length: 2:56
- Label: Bonnier Music
- Songwriters: Niclas Molinder, Joacim Persson, Pelle Ankarberg
- Producer: Twin

Helena Paparizou singles chronology
"Mambo!" (2005)	"Heroes" (2006)	"Gigolo" (2006)

"Heroes" is a song by singer and Eurovision Song Contest winner, Helena Paparizou. It was the official theme song of the 2006 European Championships in Athletics, held in Paparizou's home town Gothenburg. The song is featured on Paparizou's second international album The Game of Love, which was released on 15 November 2006 in Scandinavia.

The song is mainly in English, but does contain some Spanish lyrics such as 'viva los heros' — cognate with 'long live the heroes' — and Greek lyrics such as 'Nikes gia panta' — which means 'victories forever'.

"Heroes" was released in August 2006 in Sweden; becoming Paparizou's fifth Swedish single release. It was her first single which debuted at number one position in the Swedish Singles Chart and second to peak at number one. When "Heroes" entered the charts Paparizou's previous single "Mambo!" was still charting. On 10 September 2006, the song entered the Swedish hitlist Svensktoppen.

== Track listing ==
Swedish CD maxi-single

1. "Heroes" – 2:56
2. "Heroes" (Freerunners Radio Edit) – 2:41
3. "Heroes" (Freerunners X10ded) – 4:37

== Charts Positions ==
Chart performance for "Heroes"
Chart (2006)	Peak position
Sweden (Sverigetopplistan)	1
European Hot 100 Singles (Billboard)	91
