= To Fili Tis Zois (song) =

Single by Helena Paparizou

from the album To Fili Tis Zois (soundtrack) and Vrisko To Logo Na Zo
- Released: September 26, 2007
- Recorded: 2007
- Length: 3:36
- Label: Sony BMG
- Songwriter: Giannis Doxas
- Producers: Soumka, George Sabanis

Helena Paparizou minor singles chronology
"Min Fevgeis" (2007)	"To Fili Tis Zois" (2007)	"Porta Gia Ton Ourano" (2008)

"To Fili Tis Zois" (The Kiss of Life) is a song by Helena Paparizou, and the main theme song from To Fili Tis Zois. The song was released in the beginning of October 2007 to radios, and in November on the official soundtrack of the movie. It is also a bonus track on Paparizou's Vrisko To Logo Na Zo.

== Song information ==
The single officially debuted simultaneously on MAD Radio 106.2 and the music video on MAD TV on September 26, 2007. Some days before MAD TV had announced that something very big and special would happen. They had posted a picture of Elena, covering it with effects in order to hide her, and also the lyrics of the chorus. It was ranked the third best song of 2007 according to the MAD Exit Poll: Best Songs of the Year and 27th most watched videoclip of 2007 on MAD TV. It also ranked at #16 for the most played song of 2007 on the biggest Cypriot radio station, Super Fm. In 2008, at the Mad Video Music Awards, the song was nominated in four categories: "Best Pop Video", "Most Played Artist", "Artist of the Year", and "Best Video by a Female Artist". It won the award for the "Best Pop Video".

== Music video ==
Directed by Alex Grammatopoulos, the video starts with a woman coming out the sea before showing Elena and her band, who are partially in the water. Elena sings, while scenes from the film are shown in a quick fashion. The end shows Elena saying "Μυστήριο που ο έρωτας χτυπά" (Mystery that love beats), which appears at the end of the song. The video premiered on September 26, 2007, on MAD TV.

== Radio success ==
It quickly gained airplay all around Greece shooting it to number 1 on the Nielsen's Official Radio Airplay chart in the week of November 27 to December 3, 2007, and was first for seven weeks. In the first week of 2008, the song fell to number two beaten by the song "Beggin'" from The Four Seasons. The song is rock influenced, something different than what Elena has done before.

The song became a hit quickly and its power play surpassed the number of 22 radio stations in Athens and 11 in Thessaloniki since December, and also achieved to stay four weeks on the top of MAD Platinum Charts.

In the week from February 29 to March 5, 2008, the song was still on the Nielsen's Official Radio Airplay chart in Greece at number seven after four months of its release. The next week from March 5 to March 11, the song fell to number sixteen and the week from March 11 to March 17, it fell to number nineteen, making its last appearance.

As of July 2015, "To Fili Tis Zois" is the 44th best selling digital single ever in Greece.

== Release history ==
Country	Date	Label	Format
Greece	September 26, 2007	Sony BMG	Radio Single
Greece	October 27, 2007	Sony BMG	Digital download
Cyprus	September 27, 2007	Sony BMG	Radio Single

== Charts ==
The song is the first digital single which was certificated gold in Greece, selling more than 30,000 downloads according to IFPI.

Chart	Peak position
Greek Airplay Chart	1
Greek Digital Sales	1 (Gold)

== See also ==
- To Fili Tis Zois (film)
- To Fili Tis Zois (soundtrack)
