= Kiss of Life (2007 film) =

- Greek: Το φιλί της ζωής
- Directed by: Nick Zapatinas
- Written by: Nick Zapatinas
- Starring: Cathrine Papoutsaki, Laertis Malkotsis, Zeta Douka
- Music by: Soumka
- Distributed by: Village Productions, BLACK ORANGE S.A.
- Release date: July 1, 2007
- Running time: 103 minutes
- Country: Greece
- Language: Greek

Kiss of Life (Greek: Το φιλί της ζωής) is a 2007 film directed by Nick Zapatina.This film is known for its soundtrack, written and produced by Nick Zapatina (see To Fili Tis Zois (soundtrack)).

== Plot ==
Paschalis (Laertis Malkotsis) is a 30-year-old agronomist, about to marry his beloved Anthoula on the island of Milos. He accidentally embarks on the boat to Sifnos, where he meets Zoi (Catherine Papoutsaki), a beautiful but strange photographer who goes to the island for her own 'purposes'. Things will become even more difficult for Paschalis when a strike of ship captains may cost him his marriage! But things change when together with Zoi he meets a couple (Zeta Douka & Themos Anastasiadis) in Sifnos, who try to help him come together with his future wife in time for the marriage. But many unexpected situations lead to funny incidents and a lot of things are revealed about the four heroes.

== Cast ==
- Cathrine Papoutsaki
- Laertis Malkotsis
- Zeta Douka
- Themos Anastasiadis
- John Zouganelis
- Sakis Boulas
- Cathrine Matziou
- Chris Tripodis

== Home media ==
On Friday, 7 of March 2008, it was released on DVD. It contains English subtitles and Greek subtitles for the hearing impaired. It also contains a bonus feature introducing the landscapes and hotels of the island Sifnos, Greece.

== Box office ==
The film made had an estimated number of more than 250,000 cinema ticket sales in its 4th week of release, all in Greek cinemas alone.

== See also ==
- To Fili Tis Zois (soundtrack)
- To Fili Tis Zois (Elena Paparizou song)
