= Gigolo (Helena Paparizou song) =

2006 single by Helena Paparizou

Single by Helena Paparizou

from the album The Game of Love
- Released: November 15, 2006
- Recorded: 2006
- Genre: Pop
- Length: 3:24
- Label: Bonnier Music
- Songwriters: Alex Papaconstantinou, Marcus Englöf & Mack

Helena Paparizou singles chronology
"Heroes" (2006)	"Gigolo" (2006)	"Fos" (2007)

"Gigolo" is a song by Greek singer Helena Paparizou. It has been recorded in two languages; Greek and English, Greek/English versions also exist. The Greek version is the first track from the Greek album Iparhi Logos, while the English version appears on the international album The Game of Love. The song was released as the third single from the album. It had moderate success on several Japanese radio stations due to the release of the album. The cover art of the European single shows Helena from the English version of "Mambo!" during the additional shooting for the alternative "summer version" music video.

== Track listing ==
1. "Gigolo" [English version] – 3:24
2. "Gigolo" [Greek version] – 3:24
3. "Gigolo" [singback version] – 3:21

== Music video ==
In July 2006 the video for "Gigolo" premiered in Greece. The video is in Greeklish (Greek/English), with the first verse in Greek and the rest of the song in English. In the video Elena plays 2 parts: of herself and of the gigolo that steals Elena's mobile phone.

The video starts with Elena talking on her phone when the gigolo steals it. Security goes after the gigolo while Elena goes on set to shoot her newest videoclip. She dances to her song and as the second verse of the chorus starts the gigolo films Elena with the phone. Elena notices this and quickly chases the gigolo, along with her three dancers. Elena ends up in the car park of the building where she finds her phone on the ground. She looks at the phone, seeing a video of herself moments ago. As the song comes to an end, the gigolo appears from behind, slowly revealing that it's actually Elena herself.

== Charts ==
Charts	Peak position
Greek Airplay Chart	1
Romanian Top 100 Singles	5
Swedish Singles Chart	11
Norwegian Radio Top 20	12
Swedish Airplay Chart	13
Finnish Club Top 40	29
Turkish Singles Chart	38
Czech Pop Chart 50	46
Russian Airplay Chart	64
