= Le Temps des fleurs (album) =

Le Temps de fleurs
- Standard French edition cover artwork; international issues artwork was the same photo in different tones or the title song was included on front in various fonts.

Studio album by Dalida
- Released: December 1968; 1974, 1978 and 2004 (Reissued)
- Recorded: September 1956 – January 1968
- Studio: Hoche Studios
- Genres: Pop; easy listening; folk; power ballad; children's music
- Length: 37:20
- Language: French
- Label: Barclay
- Producer: Franz Auffray (exec.)

Dalida chronology
Un po' d'amore (1968)	Le Temps de fleurs (1968)	Ma mère me disait (1969)

Le Temps des fleurs (The Time of the Flowers) is the twenty-first studio album by French singer Dalida. Named after the title song, it was first released in 1968 and became her penultimate album to be released under Barclay Records.

Described by critics as "a poetic masterpiece with very sweet, sweet music", it was also commercially successful with international sales of around 100,000 units, becoming the best selling album released in 1968 by a French artist.

The tracks in the album are based on pop music, each one making a mixture with easy listening, schlager, folk or chanson genres. Most songs are moody ballads, which gives a seriousness to album. While "Les anges noirs" (Black angels) addresses the issue of black children's position in society, there is also a child number "Le petit perroquet" (Little parrot), for which Dalida appeared on animated television series accompanied by bird cage.

Four of twelve songs on album are cover versions. "Quelques larmes de pluie" is cover of Rain and Tears, which Dalida also recorded in German as "Regenzeit-Tränenleid" and in Italian as "Lacrime e pioggia", and released them as B-side to German and Italian singles of "An jenem Tag" and "Quelli erano giorni", respectively.

Dalida's own decision was to cover her friend Patty Pravo's songs "Io per lui" as "Je m'endors dans tes bras", and La bambola, which achieved success peaking at number 6 in Spain and Germany, 20 in France and 48 in Belgium.

== Release ==
Le Temps des fleurs was first issued in France, Belgium, Greece and Mexico in December 1968, and the next year in Canada and Germany, in 30 cm (12 inch) format under catalog number 80 378. Cover photo is credited to Vic Nova, and orchestral conduction to Guy Motta, Jean Claudricto and Giancarlo Gazzani. The album was produced by Franz Auffray and mixed by Claude Achallé.

In 1974, it became Dalida's first album ever to be reissued, this time with completely different artwork and under catalog number 950 055. In 1978, Barclay reissued it again under catalog number 95 018, but with original cover. In 2002, Barclay Records, then as part of Universal Music France, reissued the album for the last time, in original vinyl format and digitally remastered in CD. Both with original French cover art and track list, it was a part of series of re issues of all Dalida's albums released under Barclay. Thus, it became Dalida's most times re-released record, with total of five issues.

== Track listings ==
=== EP ===
Below is the first edition track list. While in the second pressing "Le petit perroquet" and "Le septième jour" exchange places and in third the tracklist disappears from front cover, the fourth pressing is same as the first except that it features "Je me repose" instead of "Le petit perroquet".

Side one
No.	Title	Writer(s)	Length
1.	"Le Temps des fleurs"	Boris Fomin & Eddy Marnay	3:57
2.	"Le petit perroquet"	Nicolas Péridès, Hubert Ithier & Jean-Claude Decamp	2:46

Side two
No.	Title	Writer(s)	Length
1.	"Je m'endors dans tes bras"	Bob Gaudio, Bob Crewe & Michel Jourdan	3:10
2.	"Le septième jour"	Boris Bergman & Michel Bernholc	2:42
Total length:			12:35

=== Album ===
Side one
No.	Title	Writer(s)	Length
1.	"Le Temps des fleurs"	Boris Fomin & Eddy Marnay	3:57
2.	"Quelques larmes de pluie"	Boris Bergman & Evangelos Papathanassiou	2:56
3.	"Manuella"	Boris Bergman & Pete Seeger	2:45
4.	"Dans la ville endormie"	Claude Lemesle & William Sheller	3:05
5.	"Le Septième Jour"	Boris Bergman & Michel Bernholc	2:46
6.	"La bambola"	Michel Jourdan & Ruggero Cini	3:34

Side two
No.	Title	Writer(s)	Length
1.	"Les Anges noirs"	Andres Eloy Blanco, Jacques Larue & Manuel Alvarez Maciste	2:50
2.	"Je m'endors dans tes bras"	Bob Gaudio, Bob Crewe & Michel Jourdan	3:10
3.	"Tire l'aiguille"	Eddie Barclay, Eddy Marnay & Emil Stern	3:25
4.	"Le Petit Perroquet"	Nicolas Péridès, Hubert Ithier & Jean-Claude Decamp	2:50
5.	"Je me repose"	Gérard Manset & William Sheller	2:42
6.	"Tzigane"	Franck Gérald & Hans Blum	3:20
Total length:			37:20
