= Mambo! (Helena Paparizou song) =

- Original Greek cover

Single by Helena Paparizou

from the album Protereotita: Euro Edition + Mambo!, Iparhi Logos, The Game of Love
- B-side: "You Set My Heart on Fire"
- Released: 17 November 2005
- Recorded: 2005
- Genre: Dance-pop
- Length: 3:06
- Label: Sony BMG Greece/Columbia
- Songwriters: Alex Papaconstantinou, Marcus Englof, Samuel Waermo
- Producers: Alex Papaconstantinou, Marcus Englof

Helena Paparizou singles chronology
"A Brighter Day" (2005)	"Mambo!" (2005)	"Heroes" (2006)

"Mambo!" is Helena Paparizou's fifth CD single and the first from her international album The Game of Love. There were two versions of the song; a Greek version and an English version. The Greek version was released in November 2005 in Greece and was a major hit going straight to number one for ten weeks including during Christmas. In total, the song charted for 23 weeks, leaving Helena with her most successful CD single to date. The single was released as a CD single and Sony BMG also re-released Helena's debut album Protereotita for a third time with her single under the name of Protereotita: Euro Edition + Mambo!.

In April 2006 it was announced that the English version of her song would be released across the globe in Austria, Switzerland, Poland, Turkey and Spain by Paparizou's own record company Sony BMG. Other record companies released her song in France, the United Kingdom, Italy, the Netherlands, Belgium, Japan, Canada, South Africa, and Australia. Moda Records remixed the song with "My Number One" in the US. The song supposed to be included on the international re-release of “My Number One”, plans scrapped in favor of the new album.

== Releases ==
"Mambo!" has been released in a number of countries throughout Europe including (in some of them the release was limited); Austria, Belgium, Denmark, Finland, Greece, Ireland, Italy, the Netherlands, Norway, Poland, Sweden, Switzerland and United Kingdom. In some other countries, it hasn't been released physically but it has entered radio airplay charts: Estonia, France, Japan, Romania, Russia, Serbia and others.

== Music videos ==
The original video for "Mambo!" was released in Greece in February 2006. This video is filmed in Greeklish. In the video Paparizou is showing of her dancing skills throughout the video. The video has an office theme for most of the video and Paparizou enters the office and makes everyone in the building dance and have a good time. At the end of the video she and dancers dance together in a routine. The video of Paparizou has been well received in Greece and won 'most played video' in the 2006 MAD TV Music Awards. Throughout the video there are clips of Coca-Cola.

In Sweden, the original video was used but in this video it was all English. In this video there are no Coca-Cola adverts whereas in the Greeklish video filmed for Greece there are.

In May, due to Paparizou starting her international career, "Mambo!" got a new video filmed to be aimed at a more global audience. It took only a day to film on a small island in Greece. On the island there is a bar is in the center of the video with many people partying and dancing to "Mambo!" Towards the end of the video Paparizou is seen dancing in a night scene. In early June, this version of "Mambo!" premiered in France. It has been a hit in music channels in Poland, South Africa and Romania.

== Track listings ==
UK CD

1. "Mambo!" [Radio edit] – 3:06
2. "Mambo!" [Alex K remix] – 6:05
3. "Mambo!" [Flip & Fill remix] – 6:38
4. "Mambo!" [Ruff & Jam club mix] – 7:42
5. "Mambo!" [Dancing DJ's remix] – 6:08
6. "Mambo!" [Fugitive club mix] – 6:35

Greek CD

1. "Mambo!" [Greek version] – 3:05
2. "Panta Se Perimena" (Idaniko Fili) – 3:50
3. "I Agapi Sou Den Meni Pia Edo" (Aşkın Açamadığı Kapı)
4. "Asteria" – 3:52
5. "Mambo!" [English version] – 3:06

Dutch CD

1. "Mambo!" [English version] – 3:06
2. "You Set My Heart on Fire" – 3:13
3. "Mambo!" [Greek version] – 3:05

Scandinavian CD

1. "Mambo!" [English version] – 3:06
2. "Mambo!" [Greek version] – 3:05

Austrian/Belgian/Swiss CD

1. "Mambo!" [English version] – 3:06
2. "You Set My Heart on Fire" – 3:13

Italian Vinyl
Side A:

1. "Mambo!" [Ruff & Jam remix]
2. "Mambo!" [Original version] – 3:05

Side B:

1. "Mambo!" [Bikini extended mix]
2. "Mambo!" [Ruff & Jam radio edit]

== Remixes ==
Official remixes

- Dancing DJs remix
- The Fugitives club mix
- Todor Ivanov aka DJ AK47
- Flip & Fill remix
- Ruff & Jam remix
- Alex K remix

Unofficial remixes

- Extended version
- Tech mix
- Jay's Boost mix
- Instrumental version

The compilation called Dance Mania, where the "Mambo" [Dancing Dj Mix] is included, was number one in the UK Charts.

== Release history ==
Region	Date	Label	Format
Greece	24 November 2005	Sony BMG	CD single, Digital download
Scandinavia	20 March 2006	Sony BMG	Digital download
Scandinavia	12 April 2006	Bonnier	CD single
Switzerland	12 April 2006	Sony BMG	CD single
Belgium	15 May 2006	ARS/EMI	CD single, digital download
Austria	May 2006	Sony BMG	CD single
France	July 2006	Sony BMG	CD single, digital download
Netherlands	14 September 2006	Digidance	CD single, digital download
Ireland	6 November 2006	AATW	CD single, digital download
United Kingdom	6 November 2006	AATW	CD single, digital download
Canada	15 August 2006	Moda	Digital download
United States	15 August 2006	Moda	Digital download
Poland	September 2006	Sony BMG	CD single
Italy	2006	FMA/No Color	12" vinyl

=== Charts ===
Chart (2005–2006)	Peak position
Belgium (Ultratop 50 Flanders)	18
Greece (IFPI Greece)	1
Sweden (Sverigetopplistan)	5
UK (The Official Charts Company)	185

=== Year-end charts ===
Chart (2006)	Position
Belgium (Ultratop Flanders)	60
Sweden (Sverigetopplistan)	30

=== Certifications ===
Country	Certification
Greece	Platinum
Sweden	Gold
