= I Kardia Sou Petra =

Single by Helena Paparizou

from the album Vrisko To Logo Na Zo
- Released: 9 June 2008
- Recorded: 2008
- Genre: Pop rock, Grunge, contemporary laïka
- Label: Sony BMG Greece/RCA
- Songwriters: Giannis Doxas, Giorgos Sampanis
- Producer: Giorgos Sampanis

Helena Paparizou minor singles chronology
"Porta Gia Ton Ourano" (2008)	"I Kardia Sou Petra" (2008)	"Pirotehnimata" (2008)

"I Kardia Sou Petra" (Greek: Η Καρδιά Σου Πέτρα; English: Your Heart Like Stone) is a song recorded by Greek pop singer Helena Paparizou. It is the second single from Vrisko To Logo Na Zo.

== Song information ==
The song was heard for the first time on Orange FM 93.2 on 2 June 2008. where Paparizou announced that it would be the second single from Vrisko To Logo Na Zo and officially aired on Sfera Radio 102.2 and on Cosmoradio 95.1 on 9 June 2008.

The music is by Giorgos Sampanis and the lyrics were written by Giannis Doxas.

Paparizou said on Orange fm 93.2 that this song had a lot of fun. Sampanis and Doxas came home and Sampanis - who is a young and talented artist - told me: 'Lena, I have a new song, I want to show it to you in order to hear your opinion about it'. He showed it to me and I told him 'I am sorry but which do you think my opinion is? This is mine, thank you!' We went downstairs to the studio and we recorded it! This is the new single from my new album.

== Music video ==
In the presentation of the album on Orange FM 93.2, Paparizou stated that the music video would be aired sometime between 7 and 12 June 2008. On 11 June 2008, MAD TV announced the concept of the music video: Elena will appear in a photo of a man who shoots an empty landscape and her features around the face and the landscape will be full emotions in surreal way. Then there is another photo with an empty landscape, Elena appears again and in the last picture, Elena disappears while the man with the camera in his pocket leaves. The music video officially premiered on 2 July on MAD TV, however, it was played at the presentation of the golden certification for the album at Egomio Atse on 25 June 2008.

The video was directed by Alexandros Grammatopoulos.

== Release history ==
Region	Date	Distributing label	Format
Greece	9 June 2008	Sony BMG Greece	Radio single
Greece	11 June 2008	Sony BMG Greece	Digital download
Cyprus	9 June 2008	Sony BMG Greece	Radio single

== Charts ==
The song jumped from No.34 to No.8 on Greek iTunes Store Top 100 Songs Chart two days after its release and its highest peak in No.2.

The song entered the Greek Digital Singles Chart at No.4 and after two weeks it peaked at No.1

Chart	Peak position
Greek Digital Singles Chart	1
Greek Airplay Chart	1
