= Pirotehnimata =

Single by Helena Paparizou

from the album Vrisko To Logo Na Zo, Helena Goes Clubbin'
- Released: December 22, 2008
- Recorded: 2008
- Genre: House, synthpop
- Length: 4:13
- Label: Sony BMG Greece/RCA
- Songwriter: Giannis Doksas
- Producer: Giorgos Sampanis

Helena Paparizou minor singles chronology
"I Kardia Sou Petra" (2008)	"Pirotehnimata" (2008)	"Eisai I Foni" (2009)

"Pirotehnimata" (Greek: "Πυροτεχνήματα"; English: Fireworks) is a song recorded by Greek pop singer Helena Paparizou and the third single from Vrisko To Logo Na Zo. The music video of the song is nominated for the Most Sexy Appearance in a Video and the Video of the Year at Mad Video Music Awards.

She also performed a 2024 Remix by Playmen on MAD VMA for her 20th anniversary of her career. Then the song released on Spotify her EP titled Party All The Time.

== Background ==
Released as the third single from the album Vrisko To Logo Na Zo, "Pirotehnimata" was originally scheduled for release in September, but the release date was pushed back due to the strong radio airplay for "I Kardia Sou Petra". The song was officially released as a radio single on December 22, 2008, while the video premiered on a special episode of Mega Star on December 27, 2008. Music is by Giorgos Sambanis with lyrics by Giannis Doksas.

== Music video ==
The music video for the song was directed by Alexandros Grammatopoulos, as were her previous four videos. It was filmed in December at Iera Odos in front of a giant video screen, and features a more international feel.

== Charts ==
"Pirotehnimata" debuted and peaked at number two on the Billboard Greek Digital Singles Chart for the week of January 24, 2009. On January 7, 2009, the Top30 most played songs of 2009 were published at Cypriot radio station site Super Fm. "Pirotehnimata" was the 8th most played Greek song in 2009 with 12171 plays, and 10th between the most played Greek-international songs.

As of July 2015, "Pirotehnimata" is the 30th best selling digital single ever in Greece.

Chart	Peak position
Greek Airplay	3
Greek Digital Sales	2
Greek Airplay Top100 of 2009	8
Greek & International Airplay Top100 of 2009	10
