= Porta Gia Ton Ourano =

Single by Helena Paparizou

from the album Vrisko To Logo Na Zo
- Released: April 8, 2008
- Recorded: 2007
- Genre: Pop rock, Grunge
- Length: 2:59
- Label: Sony BMG Greece/RCA
- Songwriters: Per Lidén, Niclas Olausson, Toni Mavridis, Eleana Vrahali
- Producers: Niclas Olausson, Toni Mavridis

Helena Paparizou minor singles chronology
"To Fili Tis Zois" (2007)	"Porta Gia Ton Ourano" (2008)	"I Kardia Sou Petra" (2008)

"Porta Gia Ton Ourano" (Greek: Πόρτα Για Τον Ουρανό; English: Door to the Sky) is a song recorded by Greek pop singer Helena Paparizou and the first single from Vrisko To Logo Na Zo. The song was released as a single on April 8, 2008 to radio stations all over Greece and Cyprus.

== Song information ==
The single officially debuted on April 8, 2008 when it was played for the first time on Kosmoradio of Thessaloniki. In Athens the song aired for the very first time on Sfera Radio.

The music is by Per Lidén, Niclas Olausson and Toni Mavridis, with lyrics by Eleana Vrahali. The photography used on the cover is by Elena's director Alexandros Grammatopoulos.

== Music video ==
The music video was directed by Alexandros Grammatopoulos and was filmed on April 8, 2008. In it, Paparizou appeared with her new style for the first time. The shooting took place in Athens and lasted 48 hours.

On April 14, 2008, MAD TV revealed the concept of the music video. Specifically MAD TV reported, " The new video of Elena Paparizou will be fairly ambient and rock having a central role in that play the elements of rain and the wind. It also contains several symbolic scenes such as feathers that appear suddenly in a telephone box, something similar to those elements that big stars use in their music videos, such as Madonna's music video "Frozen".

It made its television premiere on MAD TV's Mixer Greeks Only at 12:00 am on April 15, 2008. On 16 April the video was played all day, every hour on the hour. On April 19 the "Porta Gia Ton Ourano" music video debuted at number one on MAD TV Top 50 countdown.

== Release history ==
Region	Date	Label	Format
Greece	April 8, 2008	Sony BMG	Radio Single
Greece	May 9, 2008	Sony BMG	Digital download
Cyprus	April 8, 2008	Sony BMG	Radio Single

== Charts ==
Chart	Peak position
Greek Airplay Chart	1
Greek Digital Singles Chart	1
