= Iparhi Logos =

2006 album by Helena Paparizou

Iparhi Logos Υπάρχει Λόγος

Studio album by Helena Paparizou
- Released: 12 April 2006
- Recorded: 2006–2007
- Genres: Laïko, dance-pop, pop folk
- Length: 107:24 (Original); 133:33 (Platinum Edition)
- Languages: Greek, English (Original); French (Platinum Edition)
- Label: Sony BMG Greece/RCA

Helena Paparizou chronology
Protereotita (2004)	Iparhi Logos; Υπάρχει Λόγος (2006)	The Game of Love (2006)

Singles from Iparhi Logos
- 1. "Mambo!" Released: November 2005; 2. "Just Walk Away" Released: December 2005; 3. "Iparhi Logos" Released: April 2006; 4. "Gigolo" Released: November 2006; 5. "An Ihes Erthi Pio Noris" Released: December 2006; 6. "Fos" Released: 2006; 7. "Mazi Sou" Released: March 2007; 8. "Min Fevgeis" Released: April 2007

Professional ratings
Review scores
Source	Rating
Music Corner	(favourable)

Iparhi Logos (Greek: Υπάρχει Λόγος, English: "There is a reason") is the second studio album by Greek singer Helena Paparizou, released on 12 April 2006. Containing 29 songs on two discs, the album was certified gold in five weeks and platinum after five months of its release. It was certified platinum on 1 December 2006 at Iera Odos 30 where Paparizou was performing alongside Nino and Paschalis Terzis at the same certification party as the album The Game of Love. It was re-released on 22 May 2007 as Iparhi Logos: Platinum Edition with a bonus CD-single. The album to date has been released physically in Greece, Cyprus, Turkey, Germany, Austria, Taiwan, Switzerland and Japan.

== Album information ==
Iparhi Logos was released on 12 April 2006 as a follow-up to Paparizou's successful debut album Protereotita. The album comprises 29 songs on two discs: 14 new songs, three from the "Mambo!" CD-single, a remix of the title track, and 11 live songs from her MAD Secret Concert. The album also includes a number of covers and translations such as "Oti Axizi Einai I Stigmes" (Le bonheur) written by Manos Hadjidakis, which was a big hit in France in 1962. Six of the songs from the album were later re-recorded in English and appeared on Paparizou's international album The Game of Love released in November 2006. The album achieved mild success in Greece and Cyprus managing to top both countries' charts, while it charted in the Ifpi's Top50 Greek Albums for a whole 81 weeks. The album received platinum certifications in Greece and Cyprus. Iparhi Logos reached fourth place in the Greece Annual Top 50 Greek Albums 2006.

The album was repackaged and re-released in Greece and Cyprus in May 2007, as Iparhi Logos: Platinum Edition.

The album contains the two original CDs from the original Iparhi Logos, and the CD-single "Fos" as a bonus with seven new songs. One of the songs included a Greek cover of Celine Dion's "Pour que tu m'aimes encore", titled "An Esy M'agapas" in Greek, with lyrics by Giannis Doxas. The song "Fos" was also the title track of the Greek version of Barbie in the 12 Dancing Princesses, while "Mi Fevgeis" is a re-make of an old Greek folk song, rendered for the first time by Aloula Georgouti and covered in the 1990s by Paides en Taxi. The song "Le temps des fleurs" is by Dalida, and to date is Paparizou's first and only French-language song recorded. "Fos" had been released as a separate CD-single titled without the tracks "Pou Pige Tosi Agapi (Summer Moonlight Mix)" and "I Agapi Sou Den Meni Pia Edo".

== Track listing ==
=== Original ===
Disc One
No.	Title	Lyrics	Music	Original artist	Length
1.	"Gigolo (Greek Version)"	Nikos Gritsis, Mack	Alex Papaconstantinou, Marcus Englof		3:23
2.	"The Game of Love (Greenglish Version)"	Mack, Yiannis Doxas	Alex Papaconstantinou, Marcus Englof		3:09
3.	"Iparhi Logos" (Υπάρχει Λόγος; There is a reason)	Zoi Gripari	Efthivoulos		4:21
4.	"Mambo! (Greek Version)"	Mack	Papaconstantinou, Englof		3:05
5.	"Paradigmatos Hari" (Παραδείματος Χάρη; For example)	Andreas Bonatsos	Andreas Bonatsos		3:53
6.	"O, ti Axizi Ine I Stigmes (Le Bonheur)" (Ό,τι Αξίζει Είναι Οι Στιγμές; What counts is the moments)	Eleana Vrahali	Manos Hadjidakis	Dalida	3:38
7.	"Pote Xana (Let Me Let Go)" (Ποτέ Ξανά; Never again)	Mack, Yiannis Doxas, Vicky Gerothodorou	Alex Papaconstantinou, Marcus Englof, Mack		2:54
8.	"Meres Aiones" (Μέρες Αιώνες; Days like centuries)	Andreas Bonatsos	Andreas Bonatsos		4:02
9.	"Se Pion Na Miliso" (Σε Ποιόν Να Μιλήσω; Who should I speak to)	Andreas Bonatsos	Andreas Bonatsos		3:26
10.	"Parapono Aimovoro" (Παράπονο Αιμόβορο; Bloodthirsty complaint)	Andreas Bonatsos	Andreas Bonatsos		3:59
11.	"Panta Se Perimena (Idaniko Fili)" (Πάντα Σε Περίμενα (Ιδανικό Φιλί); I waited for you forever (Suitable kiss))	Natalia Germanou	Toni Mavridis		3:48
12.	"Anixan I Ourani" (Άνοιξαν Οι Ουρανοί; The skies cleared)	Andreas Bonatsos	Andreas Bonatsos		3:51
13.	"Asteria" (Αστέρια; Stars)	Dimos Mylonas	Efripidis Nikolidis		4:19
14.	"You Set My Heart on Fire"	Biddu	Biddu	Tina Charles	3:12

Disc Two
No.	Title	Lyrics	Music	Original artist	Length
1.	"An Ihes Erthi Pio Noris" (Αν Είχες Έρθει Πιο Νωρίς; If you had come earlier)	Antonis Pappas	Nikos Orfanos		4:05
2.	"Pou Pige Tosi Agapi" (Που Πήγε Τόση Αγάπη; Where did so much love go)	Pegasus	Pegasus		3:58
3.	"Me Theloun Ki Alli (Heart of Mine)" (Με Θέλουν Κι Άλλοι; Others want me too)	Martin Hanxen, Jimmy Thornfeldy, Urban Robertsson	Martin Hanxen, Jimmy Thornfeldy, Urban Robertsson		2:56
4.	"Tipseis (You Set My Heart on Fire)" (Τύψεις; Guilts)	Yiannis Doxas	Biddu	Tina Charles	3:13
5.	"Pote S'ena Adio" (Ποτέ Σ' Ένα Αντίο; Never in a goodbye)	Pegasus	Pegasus		4:21
6.	"Just Walk Away (Live)"	Albert Hammond	Marti Sharon	Céline Dion	3:42
7.	"Don't Speak (Live)"	Gwen Stefani, Eric Stefani	Gwen Stefani, Eric Stefani	No Doubt	3:42
8.	"Crazy (Live)"	Seal	Seal, Guy Sigsworth	Seal	4:18
9.	"Like a Prayer (Live)"	Madonna, Patrick Leonard	Madonna, Patrick Leonard	Madonna	4:05
10.	"Why? (Live)"	Elena Paparizou	Slavi Trifonov	Antique	3:42
11.	"Smooth Operator (Live)"	Sade Adu, Ray St. John	Sade Adu, Ray St. John	Sade	4:09
12.	"Can't Help Falling in Love (Live)"	George Weiss, Hugo Peretti, Luigi Creatore	George Weiss, Hugo Peretti, Luigi Creatore	Elvis Presley	3:00
13.	"Outside (Live)"	George Michael	George Michael	George Michael	3:55
14.	"To Fos Sti Psyhi/The Light in Our Soul (Live)" (Το Φως Στη Ψυχή)	Kostas Bigalis	Kostas Bigalis		2:30
15.	"Iparhi Logos (Remix)"	Zoi Gripari	Efthivoulos		4:19

=== Platinum Edition (2007) ===
Disc Three
No.	Title	Lyrics	Music	Original artist	Length
1.	"Mazi Sou" (Μαζί Σου; With you)	Eleana Vrahali	Giannis Christodoulopoulos		3:22
2.	"Min Fevgeis" (Μην Φεύγες; Don't leave)	Takis Parisinos	Lakis Karnezis	Voula Georgouti	4:11
3.	"Le temps des fleurs" (The season of flowers)	E. Marnay	G. Raskin	Dalida	3:25
4.	"An Esy M'agapas (Pour que tu m'aimes encore)" (Αν Εσύ Μ'αγαπάς; If you love me)	Jean-Jacques Goldman ελληνικοί: Γιάννης Δόξας	Jean-Jacques Goldman	Céline Dion	4:14
5.	"Fos" (Φως; Light)	Anna Ioannidou	Roth Arnie	Barbie	3:08
6.	"Pou Pige Tosi Agapi (Summer Moonlight Mix)" (Που Πήγε Τόση Αγάπη; Where did so much love go)	Pegasus	Pegasus		3:58
7.	"I Agapi Sou De Meni Pia Edo (Aşkın Açamadığı Kapı)" (Η Αγάπη Σου Δε Μένει Πια Εδώ; Your love no longer lives here (Η πόρτα που δεν μπορούσε να αγαπήσει))	Eleni Gianatsoulia	E. Uner	Demet Akalın	3:51

== Singles ==
"Mambo!"

The first single from the album was "Mambo!". It is also the only CD single from the album, with the others being radio and music video singles. It reached number 1 for 10 straight weeks in Greece including Christmas. The single stayed in the charts for 23 weeks (6 months) making it Elena's most successful CD single to date. "Mambo!" peaked at No 1 at Musiccontrol Greek Airplay and stayed in the top 10 for 20 weeks.

"Just Walk Away"

The second single from the albums was the live version of Celine Dion's "Just walk away".

"Iparhi Logos"

The third single from the album is also the title of the album, "Iparhi Logos". The music video for the song was directed by White Room. The song premiered at the Arion Music Awards in April 2006 and was quickly released on radios, peaking at No3.

"Gigolo"

The fourth single from the album was "Gigolo". The video clip of the song is in 'Greeklish'. It was a major hit on Greek radios, having its peak at No12.

"An Ihes Erthi Pio Noris"

The fifth single was "An Ihes Erthi Pio Noris". The music video for the song premiered on 12 December 2006 on MAD TV and reunited Paparizou with director Giorgos Gavalos. "An Eixes Erthei Pio Noris" is the only single from the album not to have an English version. The song reached the number one position on the Greek iTunes Music Store. "An Eixes Erthei Pio Noris" managed to peak at no3 for 6 non-consecutive weeks at the greek airplay

"Mazi Sou"

The seventh single, and first off of the platinum edition, was "Mazi sou", released in March 2007 on the soundtrack single of a show of the same name on Mega Channel. The song had a great success, peaking No1 for 2 consecutive weeks

"Min Fevgeis"

The eighth single from the album is "Min Fevgeis", which was released to radio play on 23 April 2007 and also included on the four track CD single, "Fos", released on 18 May 2007. A music video of the song was made and it was filmed without much media attention and therefore came as a surprise when released. It is believed Elena wanted the video to be like one of her old videos from the Antique-era; the video clip premiered on 7 June 2007. The song peaked at number two on the Nielsen Greek Airplay Chart.

== Release history ==
Region	Date	Label	Format	Version
Greece	12 April 2006	Sony Music/RCA	CD	Original release
Cyprus	12 April 2006	Sony Music/RCA	CD	Original release
Greece	22 May 2007	Sony Music/RCA	CD	Platinum Edition
Cyprus	22 May 2007	Sony Music/RCA	CD	Platinum Edition
Germany	2 February 2007	-	-	

== Charts ==
Iparhi Logos peaked at number 1 on the Greek charts for eight consecutive weeks. It was released on 17 July 2006 in Cyprus where it also peaked at number 1 and charted for over 24 weeks.

Chart	Providers	Peak position	Weeks On Charts	Certification
Greek Albums Chart	IFPI	1	82	Platinum
Cypriot Album Chart	All Records Top 20	1	50	Platinum
