= To Fili Tis Zois (soundtrack) =

Soundtrack album by various artists
- Released: November 2007
- Recorded: 2007
- Genre: Pop rock
- Label: Sony BMG
- Producer: Soumka

Singles from To Fili Tis Zois
- 1. "To Fili Tis Zois" Released: September 26, 2007

To Fili Tis Zois is the soundtrack album from the film of the same name. It was released in November 2007 by Sony BMG. The album contains the film score which is composed by "Soumka" (Christos Soumkas), and also features songs by Elena Paparizou and Giorgos Sampanis. The soundtrack's title track, sung by Elena Paparizou, was released as a single and became a hit.

== Track listing ==
1. "To Fili Tis Zois" – Elena Paparizou Writers: Giorgos Sampanis, Kostas Doxas. – 3:39
2. "Dio Nisia" – Γιώργος Σαμπάνης Writers: Giorgos Sampanis, Kostas Doxas. – 4:09
3. "Milos Island" – Writers: Jonh Bithikotsis – 3:31
4. "Pedozali" – Ωmega Vibes – 4:20
5. "Ki Istera Lene Pos Ama Pieis Meta Den..." – Producers:Spumka – 3:54
6. "Epaggelma Fotografos" – Producers:Soumka – 1:49
7. "Dipla Mou Se Eho" – Producers:Soumka – 2:22
8. "Time for Dinner" – Producers:Soumka – 1:35
9. "O Choros Tis Zois" – Producers:Soumka – 1:10
10. "Freedom" – Producers:Soumka – 3:48
11. "Paschalis & Zoi (Love Theme)" – Producers:Soumka – 3:09
12. "Me Lene Paschali Kai Pandreuomai Tin Kiriaki" – Producers:Soumka – 1:38
13. "Paschali's Theme" – Producers:Soumka – 1:15
14. "Μa Pou Vriskomai" – Producers:Soumka – 1:04
15. "Ο Gamos" – Producers:Soumka – 2:46
16. "Sofia's Theme" – Producers:Soumka – 0:55
17. "Alone" – Producers:Soumka – 1:53
18. "Melancholy" – Producers:Soumka – 1:26
19. "Life Goes On..." – Producers:Soumka – 3:37

== Chart performance ==
The album debuted in the Greek Charts at number 9 in its first week of release.

Chart	Providers	Peak position	Certification	Sales
Greek Albums Chart	IFPI	9	Gold	
