= Le Temps des fleurs =

- Cover of EP

Song by Dalida
- Released: 1968
- Recorded: September 20, 1968
- Studio: Hoche
- Genre: Chanson; Russian romance
- Length: 3:58
- Label: Barclay
- Composer: Boris Fomin
- Lyricist: Eddy Marnay

"Le Temps des fleurs"
The pop influenced French version of Russian romance song is the second and only version alongside "Those were the days" that made a commercial impact.

"Le Temps des fleurs" (French pronunciation: [lə tɑ̃ de flœʁ]; "The time of flowers") is a song by French singer Dalida for her twenty-first studio album of the same name. While the French lyrics were written by Eddy Marnay, the melody was taken from Russian romance song "Dorogoi dlinnoyu" ("Дорогой длинною"), composed by Boris Fomin in 1924. Dalida covered the song after Mary Hopkin had a hit with her English version "Those Were the Days" one month earlier.

Le Temps des fleurs is Dalida's first recording to debut atop of French song chart, while it peaked the newly established "Centre d'Information et de Documentation du Disque" sales chart two weeks after entry. The record was a sales success and earned Dalida her twenty-eighth gold disc, which made Dalida record it also in Italian as "Quelli erano giorni", and in German as "An jenem Tag". In France, the song remains as one of 1960s classics, and Dalida's signature songs.

== Background ==
Two weeks after the release of "Those Were the Days", while it was still unknown that it was plagiarism as Gene Raskin took credit for the melody written by composer Boris Fomin, Eddie Barclay obtained the melody from Raskin legally. In 1973, after it was discovered that Raskin was just a songwriter and not a composer, Barclay stopped giving Raskin a portion of the song's annual profit, but abandoned the lawsuit and didn't receive a refund.

=== Recording and composition ===
Le Temps des fleurs is a romantic ballad, with elements of Russian folk and French chanson. Lyrics describe innocence of childhood and youth and reflect on the passage of time. It features violin, mandoline, string, clarinet and background vocals highlighted refrain. The French lyrics were written by renowned French Jewish lyricist Eddy Marnay, and the song was recorded on 20 September 1968 from one cut in Studios Hoche under orchestral conduction by Guy Motta. Journalist of ORTF was present and Dalida was interviewed for television and live radio transmission.

Other songs from EP were recorded during following week, under orchestral conduction by Guy Motta and Jean Claudric; "Le petit perroquet", "Je m'endors dans tes bras", "Le septième jour" and "Je me repose".

=== Release and acclaim ===
Le Temps des fleurs was released in early October on EP, in 18 cm (7 inch) format under catalog number 71 296, with cover photo credited to Georges Dambier. It immediately scored a success in its first week, selling roughly around 30,000 copies and reaching top of the French radio charts where it remained for four consecutive weeks. Dalida promoted the record during her current concert tour, over radio and television, mostly for title song, but also making several appearances for others. Paris Match described: "to watch Dalida performing [the song] on television is as incredible as listening to the song itself". Until late 1969, the record was reissued for three more times, Barclay Records' personal record, and sold over 415,000 units.

=== Other languages ===
Dalida was first one to record the song in French, German and Italian. Lyrics of German version "An jenem Tag" were written by Heinz Korn, and Italian "Quelli erano Giorni" by Daiano. Both were recorded and released in October on singles, with B-side each having their language equivalent of Dalida's French song Quelques larmes de pluie. With them, Dalida charted fairly, entering Top 10 in Germany and Top 20 in Italy, collectively selling additional 90,000 copies.

All three language versions by Dalida received covers from other artists like Ima, but also Mary Hopkin and Sandie Shaw, failing to leave an impact.

=== Charts ===
Chart (1968)	Peak position
France (RMC airplay)	1
France (CIDD)	1
Belgium	7
Germany	9
Italy	16
Monte Carlo (RMC airplay)	1
Switzerland	2
