= The Game of Love (album) =

2006 album of Elena Paparizou

Studio album by Helena Paparizou
- Released: October 25, 2006
- Recorded: 2005–2006
- Genres: Dance-pop, pop folk, pop
- Length: 47:10
- Languages: English, Greek
- Label: Sony BMG Greece/RCA

Helena Paparizou chronology
Iparhi Logos (2006)	The Game of Love (2006)	Vrisko To Logo Na Zo (2008)

Singles from The Game of Love
- 1. "Mambo!" Released: November 17, 2005 / April 12, 2006; 2. "Heroes" Released: August 7, 2006; 3. "Gigolo" Released: November 15, 2006; 4. "Teardrops" Released: December 2006; 5. "The Game of Love" Released: March 7, 2007

Professional ratings
Review scores
Source	Rating
Music Corner =	(favourable)

The Game of Love is the second English-language international album by Greek singer Helena Paparizou. It was first released in Greece on 25 October 2006. The album is composed of 12 tracks and a bonus track; seven of these had been previously released on Paparizou's previous album Iparhi Logos, and another was released exclusively to Scandinavia as the official song of the European Athletics Championships. Five of the songs were just English translations of Greek songs as well as two covers. The album was Paparizou's second album in Scandinavia. The album has enjoyed mild success in Greece and Cyprus where it topped the charts and quickly attained platinum certification, while it failed to chart in other countries.

== Album information ==
Released as an attempt to break the international market, the album was originally intended to be released all over Europe, including France and the United Kingdom, Australia, Canada, North Africa and Asia, in at least 45 countries initially, with a possible release in the United States. However, after little to no promotional performances by Paparizou, and the failure of the album in Sweden and lack of success of the singles, the international release of the album became an aborted project by Sony BMG and thus it was released in only 14 countries. Paparizou had also stated at the time, that she did not wish to leave her family and loved ones behind in Greece, to go out and try to make a career internationally. She had stated that if it meant to be, it will happen on its own.

The album contains 13 tracks, 7 of which have already been released, 6 songs are English translations of Greek songs released on album Helena's previous album Υπάρχει Λόγος. The song "Heroes" has already been released as a single in Finland and Sweden. The 6 remaining tracks have been written especially for this album. It also includes the hit single "Mambo!" which had success in many charts around the world. In the Japanese version of The Game of Love, "It's Gone Tomorrow" is not included.

The songs "Carpe Diem (Seize the Day)" and "Teardrops" have been written by Elena herself. There is also a bonus track called "Ό,τι Αξίζει Είναι Οι Στιγμές" (Oti Axizi Ine I Stigmes (Le Bonheur)), which was originally a song by Manos Hadjidakis, and was a big hit in France in 1962. "You Set My Heart on Fire" belongs to Tina Charles.

In December 2007, the song "It's Gone Tomorrow" (Iparhi Logos) (Originally track 9) was removed from The Game of Love because of problems with the original lyricist. All copies with the track still on store shelves were returned to Sony BMG with new copies being sent out minus that track. The new version also came with the Nokia logo on the front cover, as well as Helena's Nokia advertisement picture inside the CD booklet. The CD also comes in a special paper case that the jewel case slides into.

== Track listing ==
No.	Title	Writer(s)	Length
1.	"Gigolo"	Alex Papaconstantinou, Marcus Englöf & Mack	3:22
2.	"Somebody's Burning (Put The Fire Out)"	Toni Mavridis, Niclas Olausson & Sam Mcarthy	3:12
3.	"The Game of Love"	Alex Papaconstantinou, Marcus Englöf & Mack	3:09
4.	"Mambo!"	Alex Papaconstantinou, Marcus Englöf & Samuel Waerno	3:04
5.	"Carpe Diem (Seize the Day)"	Toni Mavridis, Niclas Olausson, Elena Paparizou & Sam Mcarthy	3:37
6.	"Teardrops"	Toni Mavridis, Niclas Olauson & Elena Paparizou	3:49
7.	"Let Me Let Go" (English version of Pote Ksana)	Alex Papaconstantinou, Marcus Englöf & Mack	2:54
8.	"Heroes" (The official theme song of the 2006 European Championships in Athletics)	N. Molinder, J. Persson & P. Ankarberg	2:55
9.	"It's Gone Tomorrow" (English version of Iparhei Logos)	Eftivoulos & Mack	4:16
10.	"Heart of Mine" (English version of Me Theloun Ki Alloi)	Martin Hanxen, Jimmy Thornfeldy & Urban Robertsson	2:56
11.	"You Set My Heart on Fire"	Biddu	3:12
12.	"Voulez Vous?"	Marcus Englöf, Alex Papaconstantinou & Mack	3:03
13.	"Seven Days"	Per Liden	3:26
14.	"Oti Axizi Ine I Stigmes (Le Bonheur)"	Manos Hadjidakis & Eleana Vrahali	3:39

== Bonus tracks ==
South African Edition

No.	Title	Writer(s)	Length
15.	"My Number One"	Christos Dantis & Natalia Germanou	2:55

Japanese Edition

No.	Title	Writer(s)	Length
15.	"Mambo! (P.K.G / Slashmix)"	Alex Papaconstantinou, Marcus Englof & Samuel Waerno Remixed by Hiromitsu Watanabe	7:39

== Singles ==
"Mambo!"

The first single from the album was "Mambo!". The song was released as a CD single almost a full year prior to the album's release in Greece and Cyprus in November 2005. After the album's release, the song was released all across Europe where it charted on various national charts, as well as the United States.

"Heroes"

The second single from the album was "Heroes". The song was the official theme song of the 2006 European Championships in Athletics in Sweden. The song was released only in Sweden as a CD single in August 2006, prior to the album's release, where it topped the Swedish single charts.

"Gigolo"

The third single from the album was "Gigolo". The song was released as a radio single in Greece and Cyprus in July 2006, prior to the album's release. The song was later released as a CD single in Scandinavia, where it charted on various national charts.

"Teardrops"

The last single released in Greece from the album was "Teardrops". The song was only released to radio stations in Greece and Cyprus in December 2006, where it reached number one on both of the countries respective airplay charts.

"The Game of Love"

The last single from the album released outside of Greece was the title track "The Game of Love", which came out digitally as a promotional single in Scandinavian countries in March 2007.

== Release history ==
Region	Date	Label
Greece	October 25, 2006	Sony BMG
Cyprus	October 25, 2006	Sony BMG
South Africa	November 13, 2006	Gallo Record Company
Scandinavia	November 15, 2006	Bonnier Music
Russia	April 29, 2007	Sony BMG
Japan	October 24, 2007	BMG Japan

== Charts ==
Chart	Providers	Peak position	Weeks on Chart	Certification
Greek Albums Chart	IFPI	1	36	Platinum
Cypriot Album Chart	All Records Top 20	1	50	Platinum
Swedish Albums Chart	GLF	18	4	
